= C. J. McLaughlin =

American racing driver (born 1992)

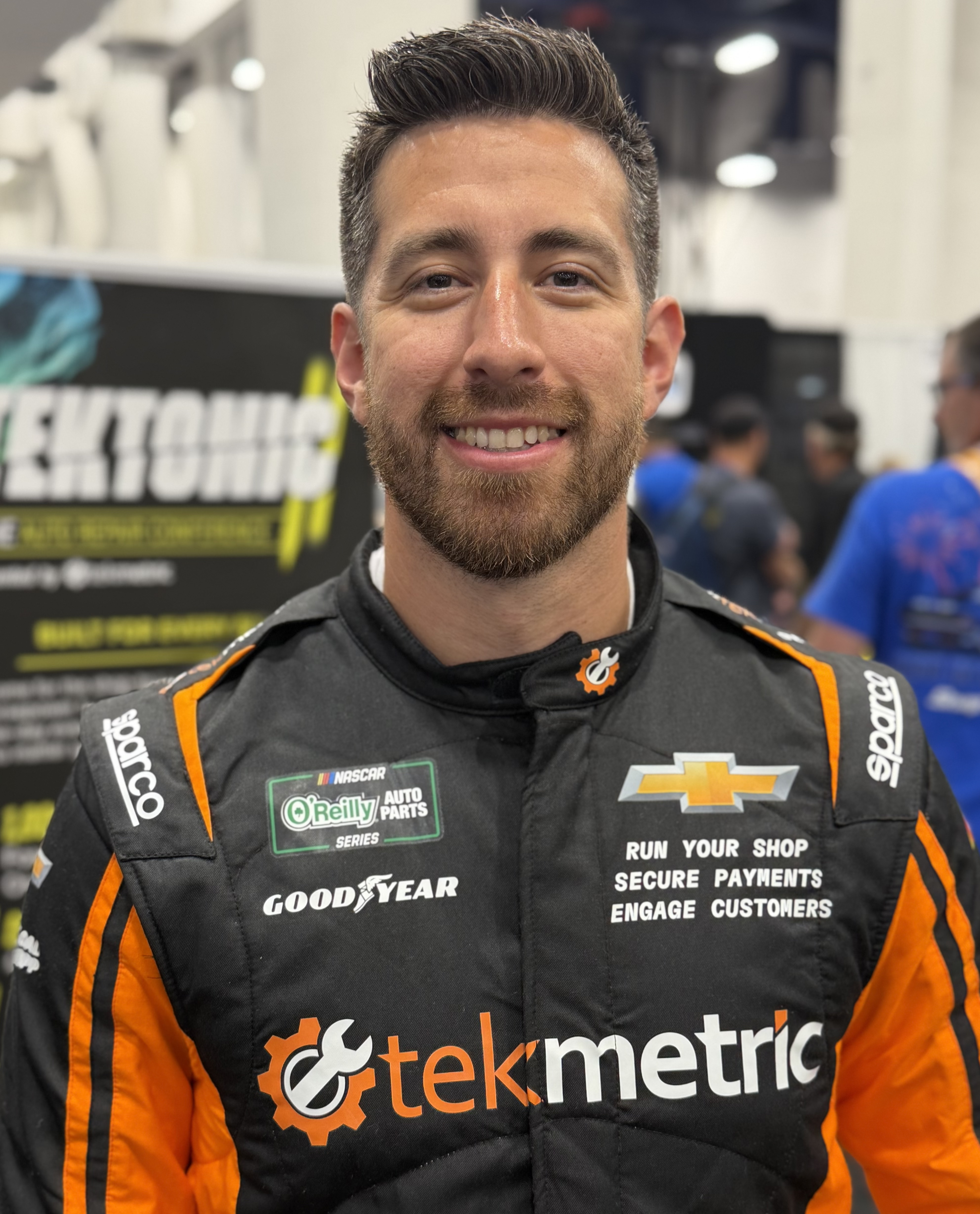
- McLaughlin in 2025
- Born: Charles Joseph McLaughlin; July 1, 1992 (age 34); Framingham, Massachusetts, U.S.

NASCAR O'Reilly Auto Parts Series career
- 50 races run over 8 years
- 2026 position: 59th
- Best finish: 39th (2022, 2023)
- First race: 2019 ROXOR 200 (New Hampshire)
- Last race: 2026 BetRivers 200 (Dover)
Wins	Top tens	Poles
0	1	0

NASCAR FedEx Freight Truck Series career
- 5 races run over 2 years
- 2021 position: 108th
- Best finish: 108th (2021)
- First race: 2019 M&M's 200 (Iowa)
- Last race: 2021 Victoria's Voice Foundation 200 (Las Vegas)
Wins	Top tens	Poles
0	0	0

ARCA Menards Series career
- 6 races run over 3 years
- Best finish: 36th (2019)
- First race: 2018 Shore Lunch 200 (IRP)
- Last race: 2023 General Tire 150 (Charlotte)
Wins	Top tens	Poles
0	1	0

ARCA Menards Series East career
- 1 race run over 1 year
- Best finish: 44th (2023)
- First race: 2023 General Tire 125 (Dover)
Wins	Top tens	Poles
0	0	0
- Statistics up to date as of November 7, 2026.

Charles Joseph McLaughlin (born July 1, 1992) is an American professional stock car racing driver. He last competed part-time in the NASCAR O'Reilly Auto Parts Series, driving the No. 42 Chevrolet Camaro SS for Young's Motorsports. He previously competed in the NASCAR Truck Series and the ARCA Menards Series.

== Racing career ==
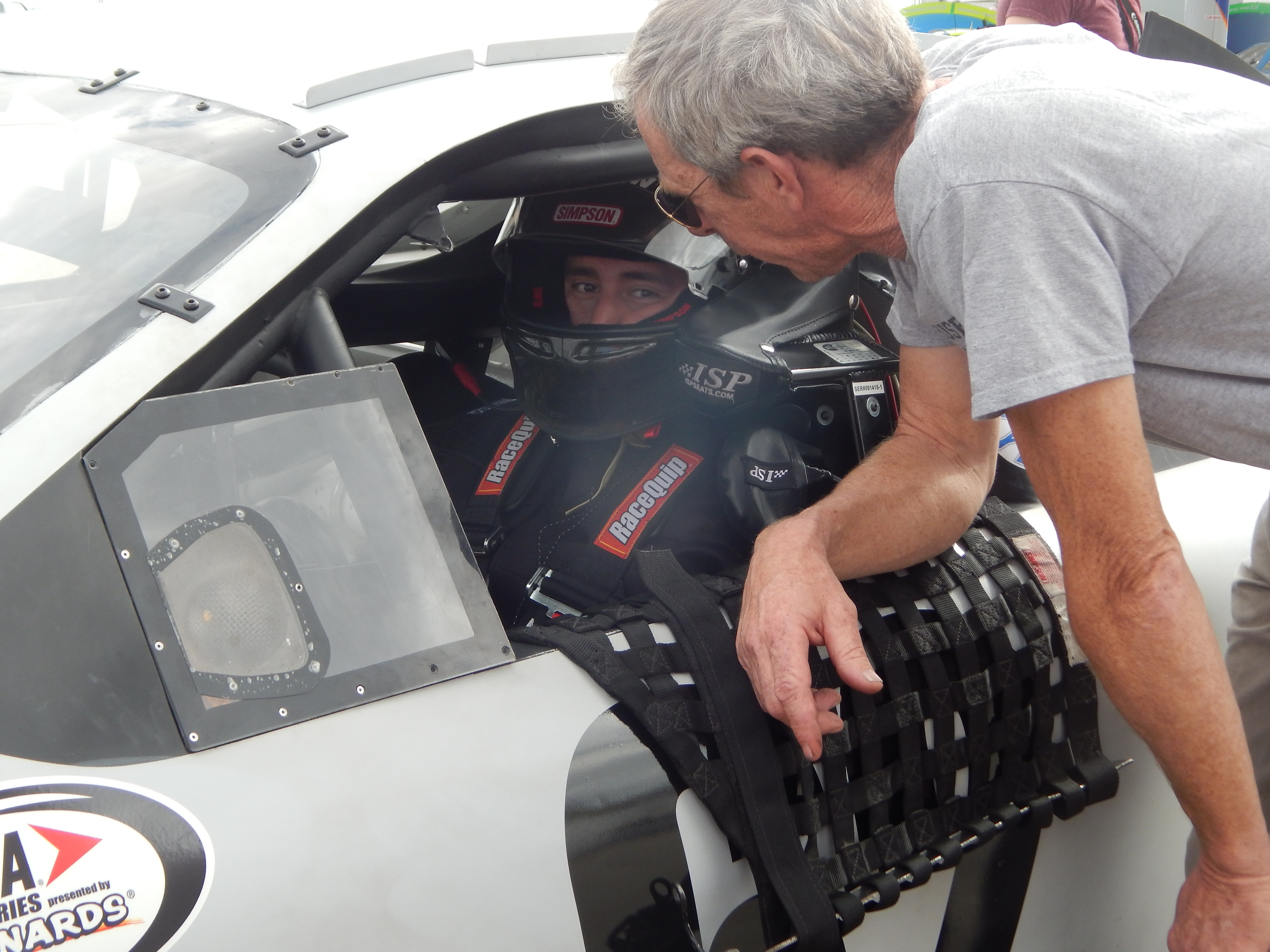
McLaughlin (inside the car) alongside his father during a testing session in 2016

McLaughlin tested an ARCA Racing Series car for Hamilton Hughes Racing in early 2016.

In June 2019, McLaughlin finished 23rd in his first NASCAR Gander Outdoors Truck Series race in the M&M's 200 at Iowa Speedway, driving the No. 33 for Reaume Brothers Racing. The following month, he made his NASCAR Xfinity Series debut in the ROXOR 200 at New Hampshire Motor Speedway for RSS Racing. McLaughlin remained with RSS for the 2020 NASCAR Xfinity Series season, running a 20-race schedule with the team.

On April 21, 2021, McLaughlin appeared on a podcast and announced that he would return to Reaume Brothers Racing to compete in five Truck Series races for the team, beginning at Kansas in the No. 34. His schedule also included the race at Charlotte. He also revealed that he would be competing in the Xfinity Series for five races, one of them being New Hampshire, but he did not announce which team he would be driving for. He would end up driving for both MBM Motorsports and Mike Harmon Racing in the Xfinity Series in 2021.

In 2022, McLaughlin returned to RSS Racing to drive part-time for the team in the Xfinity Series in the team's Nos. 38 and 28 cars. He did not run any Truck Series races that year.

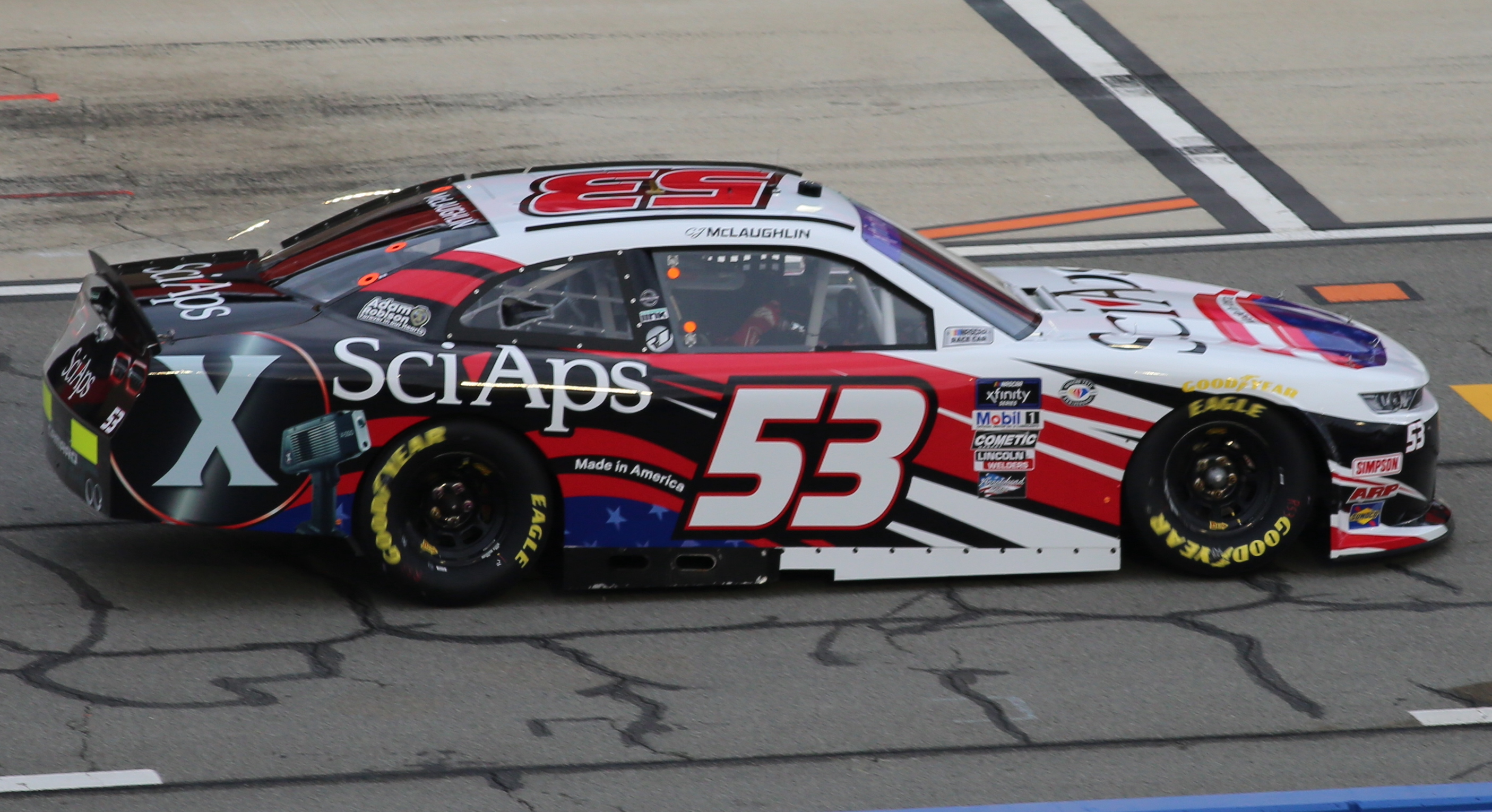
McLaughlin at Auto Club Speedway in 2023

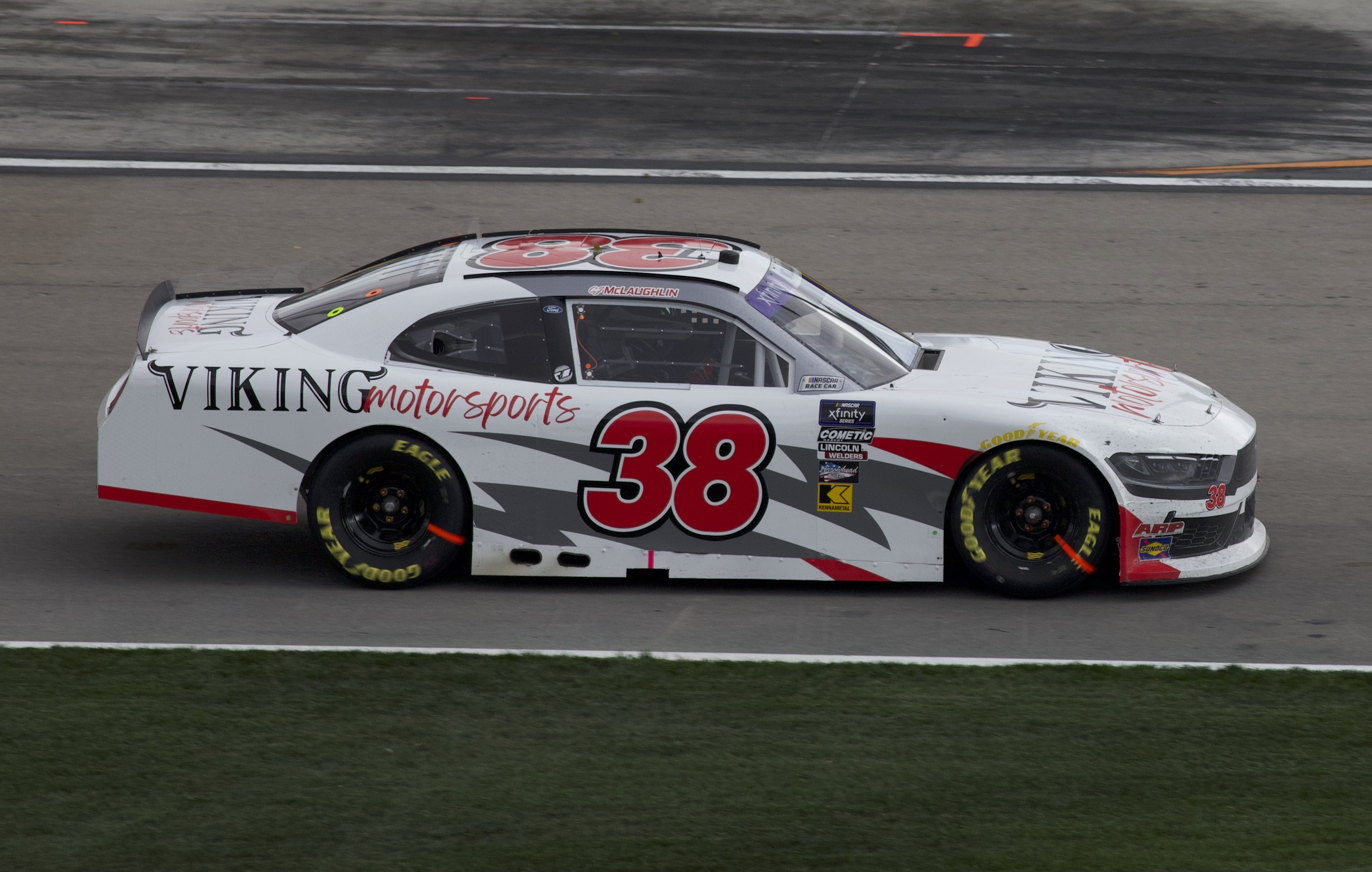
McLaughlin's No. 38 car at Las Vegas Motor Speedway in 2024.

On January 30, 2023, it was announced that McLaughlin would run eighteenth races in either the No. 35 car or No. 53 car for Emerling-Gase Motorsports in the Xfinity Series in 2023. After it was announced on February 2 that team co-owner Joey Gase would drive the No. 53 car at Daytona, it was also revealed that McLaughlin, along with Brad Perez and other EGM co-owner Patrick Emerling, would drive the No. 53 with the No. 35 car having one full-time driver.

In 2024, McLaughlin started the Xfinity Series season driving part-time for RSS Racing in their No. 38 car. That year, Don Sackett, CEO of longtime sponsor SciAps, entered into a team ownership collaboration with RSS, and the entry was fielded under the banner of Viking Motorsports. After McLaughlin competed in the early part of the season, Matt DiBenedetto took over driving duties for the remainder of the year. McLaughlin later returned to the Xfinity Series with SS-Green Light Racing for three races: Daytona in August in the No. 14 car, and Atlanta in September and Talladega in October in the No. 07 car. He was sponsored by Main Street Auto for these events.

== Personal life ==
McLaughlin graduated from Wentworth Institute of Technology with a degree in mechanical engineering.

He is not related to former NASCAR driver Mike McLaughlin and his son Max, who has also competed in the Truck and ARCA Series in recent years.

== Motorsports career results ==
=== NASCAR ===
(key) (Bold – Pole position awarded by qualifying time. Italics – Pole position earned by points standings or practice time. * – Most laps led.)

==== O'Reilly Auto Parts Series ====
NASCAR O'Reilly Auto Parts Series results
Year	Team	No.	Make	1	2	3	4	5	6	7	8	9	10	11	12	13	14	15	16	17	18	19	20	21	22	23	24	25	26	27	28	29	30	31	32	33	NOAPSC	Pts	Ref
2019	RSS Racing	39	Chevy	DAY	ATL	LVS	PHO	CAL	TEX	BRI	RCH	TAL	DOV	CLT	POC	MCH	IOW	CHI	DAY	KEN	NHA; 28	IOW	GLN	MOH													45th	55	
2019	B. J. McLeod Motorsports	99	Toyota																						BRI; 23	ROA	DAR	IND									45th	55	
2019	RSS Racing	93	Chevy																										LVS; 31				KAN; 24	TEX; 27	PHO	HOM; 31	45th	55	
2019	RSS Racing	38	Chevy																											RCH; 31	ROV	DOV					45th	55	
2020	RSS Racing	93	Chevy	DAY; 27	LVS	CAL	PHO	DAR	CLT	BRI	ATL	HOM	HOM	TAL	POC	IRC	KEN	KEN	TEX	KAN	ROA	DRC	DOV	DOV	DAY	DAR	RCH	RCH	BRI	LVS	TAL					PHO; 37	56th	36	
2020	B. J. McLeod Motorsports	99	Chevy																													ROV; 29	KAN				56th	36	
2020	B. J. McLeod Motorsports	78	Toyota																															TEX; 20	MAR		56th	36	
2021	MBM Motorsports	66	Ford	DAY	DRC	HOM	LVS	PHO	ATL	MAR	TAL	DAR	DOV	COA	CLT	MOH	TEX	NSH	POC	ROA	ATL; 37																66th	13	
2021	MBM Motorsports	61	Toyota																			NHA; 37	GLN	IRC	MCH	DAY	DAR										66th	13	
2021	Mike Harmon Racing	74	Chevy																									RCH; 40	BRI	LVS; 32	TAL; 34	ROV	TEX; 35	KAN	MAR	PHO	66th	13	
2022	RSS Racing	38	Ford	DAY; 35	CAL										TEX; 25	CLT; 23	PIR	NSH	ROA	ATL	NHA; 13	POC	IRC	MCH; 37	GLN			KAN; 34	BRI; 24	TEX; 10	TAL; 29	ROV	LVS; 30	HOM; 31	MAR; 24	PHO	39th	143	
2022	RSS Racing	28	Ford			LVS; 24	PHO	ATL	COA	RCH	MAR	TAL; DNQ	DOV	DAR												DAY; DNQ	DAR										39th	143	
2023	Emerling-Gase Motorsports	35	Ford	DAY; 31																																	39th	103	
2023	Emerling-Gase Motorsports	53	Chevy		CAL; 37	LVS; QL^{†}	PHO	ATL	COA	RCH	MAR										NHA; 28	POC	ROA	MCH; DNQ	IRC	GLN	DAY	DAR									39th	103	
2023	Emerling-Gase Motorsports	53	Ford									TAL; 13	DOV; 34	DAR	CLT; DNQ	PIR	SON																				39th	103	
2023	Emerling-Gase Motorsports	53	Toyota															NSH; PR^{‡}	CSC	ATL																	39th	103	
2023	RSS Racing	28	Ford																										KAN; 22	BRI	TEX; 25	ROV	LVS; 29	HOM; 37	MAR; 13	PHO	39th	103	
2024	RSS Racing	38	Ford	DAY; DNQ	ATL; 35	LVS; 33	PHO; DNQ	COA	RCH	MAR	TEX	TAL	DOV	DAR	CLT	PIR	SON	IOW	NHA	NSH	CSC	POC	IND	MCH													50th	47	
2024	SS-Green Light Racing	14	Chevy																						DAY; 19	DAR											50th	47	
2024	SS-Green Light Racing	07	Chevy																								ATL; 34	GLN	BRI	KAN	TAL; 17	ROV	LVS	HOM	MAR	PHO	50th	47	
2025	DGM Racing with Jesse Iwuji Motorsports	92	Chevy	DAY; DNQ	ATL; 25	COA	PHO	LVS	HOM	MAR	DAR				TEX; DNQ																						51st	33	
2025	DGM Racing with Jesse Iwuji Motorsports	91	Chevy									BRI; 33	CAR	TAL		CLT; 29	NSH	MXC	POC	ATL; 28	CSC	SON	DOV	IND	IOW	GLN	DAY	PIR	GTW	BRI	KAN	ROV	LVS	TAL	MAR	PHO	51st	33	
2026	Young's Motorsports	42	Chevy	DAY	ATL	COA	PHO	LVS	DAR	MAR	CAR	BRI	KAN	TAL	TEX	GLN	DOV; 30	CLT	NSH	POC	COR	SON	CHI	ATL	IND	IOW	DAY	DAR	GTW	BRI	LVS	CLT	PHO	TAL	MAR	HOM	59th	7	
^{†} – Qualified but replaced by Patrick Emerling ∙ ^{‡} – Practiced but replaced by Joey Gase before qualifying

==== Camping World Truck Series ====
NASCAR Camping World Truck Series results
Year	Team	No.	Make	1	2	3	4	5	6	7	8	9	10	11	12	13	14	15	16	17	18	19	20	21	22	23	NCWTC	Pts	Ref
2019	Reaume Brothers Racing	33	Chevy	DAY	ATL	LVS	MAR	TEX	DOV	KAN	CLT	TEX	IOW; 23	GTW	CHI	KEN	POC	ELD	MCH	BRI	MSP	LVS	TAL	MAR	PHO	HOM	109th	0^{1}	
2021	Reaume Brothers Racing	34	Toyota	DAY	DRC	LVS	ATL	BRD	RCH	KAN; 34	DAR	COA	CLT; 27	TEX	NSH	POC	KNX	GLN	GTW	DAR							108th	0^{1}	
2021	Reaume Brothers Racing	33	Toyota																		BRI; 26	LVS; 20	TAL	MAR	PHO		108th	0^{1}	

^{*} Season still in progress
^{1} Ineligible for series points

=== ARCA Menards Series ===
(key) (Bold – Pole position awarded by qualifying time. Italics – Pole position earned by points standings or practice time. * – Most laps led.)

ARCA Menards Series results
Year	Team	No.	Make	1	2	3	4	5	6	7	8	9	10	11	12	13	14	15	16	17	18	19	20	AMSC	Pts	Ref
2018	Fast Track Racing	10	Toyota	DAY	NSH	SLM	TAL	TOL	CLT	POC	MCH	MAD	GTW	CHI	IOW	ELK	POC	ISF	BLN	DSF	SLM	IRP; 20	KAN	90th	155	
2019	Our Motorsports	09	Chevy	DAY; 24	FIF	SLM	TAL; 11	NSH	TOL	CLT; 25	POC													36th	490	
2019	Our Motorsports	09	Ford									MCH; 10	MAD	GTW	CHI	ELK	IOW	POC	ISF	DSF	SLM	IRP	KAN	36th	490	
2023	Fast Track Racing	01	Chevy	DAY	PHO	TAL	KAN	CLT; 26	BLN	ELK	MOH	IOW	POC	MCH	IRP	GLN	ISF	MLW	DSF	KAN	BRI	SLM	TOL	114th	18	

==== ARCA Menards Series East ====
ARCA Menards Series East results
Year	Team	No.	Make	1	2	3	4	5	6	7	8	AMSEC	Pts	Ref
2023	Fast Track Racing	12	Toyota	FIF	DOV; 13	NSV	FRS	IOW	IRP	MLW	BRI	44th	31	
