= 2011 WinStar World Casino 350K =

Race details
- Race 24 of 25 in the 2011 NASCAR Camping World Truck Series season
- Simple line diagram of Texas Motor Speedway track layout
- Date: November 4, 2011
- Location: Texas Motor Speedway, Fort Worth, Texas
- Course: Permanent racing facility
- Course length: 1.5 miles (2.414 km)
- Distance: 148 laps, 222 mi (357.274 km)
- Scheduled distance: 147 laps, 220.5 mi (354.86 km)
- Weather: Temperatures reaching up to 63 °F (17 °C); wind speeds up to 7 miles per hour (11 km/h)
- Average speed: 121.275 mph (195.173 km/h)

Pole position
Driver	James Buescher	Turner Scott Motorsports
- Time: 29.824

Most laps led
Driver	Kevin Harvick	Kevin Harvick Incorporated
- Laps: 61

Winner
No. 2	Kevin Harvick	Kevin Harvick Incorporated

Television in the United States
- Network: Speed

The 2011 WinStar World Casino 350K was a NASCAR Camping World Truck Series event held on November 4, 2011, at the Texas Motor Speedway in Fort Worth, Texas. Contested over 148 laps of the 1.5 miles (2.4 km) oval, it was the second-last race of the season, and was won by Kevin Harvick in a green–white–checkered finish.

The race became notable for an incident on its fourteenth lap, where Kyle Busch deliberately spun out series regular (and championship contender) Ron Hornaday on a resulting caution after Hornaday caused Busch's truck to slide into a wall. Its aftermath affected the championship contentions of both drivers (in the Sprint Cup Series and the Camping World Truck Series respectively), and NASCAR's response to the incident also led to the first ever parking of a driver across all three races of a race weekend involving all of the association's national series since the original establishment of the Truck Series in 1995.

== Report ==
James Buescher won the pole position for the race, setting a lap speed of 181.062 mph (291.391 km/h). Austin Dillon, Blake Feese, Kyle Busch and Ricky Carmichael started from the top five; Tim Andrews, Norm Benning and Derek White failed to qualify for the event.

In the race, Kevin Harvick won his fourth event of the season; Austin Dillon finished second. James Buescher ran out of fuel on a green–white–checkered finish and dropped from third to 19th. The victory saw Harvick's No. 2 Chevrolet team clinch the series' Owners Championship.

=== Ron Hornaday and Kyle Busch conflict ===
On Lap 13, Kyle Busch and Ron Hornaday, who was in third in points 15 behind, were battling for second side by side when they approached a lapped truck in Johnny Chapman. Both Busch and Hornaday tried to go around the outside of Chapman while still side by side but Hornaday ended up getting loose and made contact with Busch and both trucks slid up into the wall in turn 2 bringing out the caution. This made Busch angry and Busch went to retaliate Hornaday by trying to turn him with Busch's spotter telling Busch to calm down and to get off of Hornaday. Unfortunately, it was too late as Busch deliberately turned Hornaday into the outside wall under caution, ending Hornaday's title hopes. NASCAR black-flagged Busch, parking him from the event. The next morning, NASCAR announced that Busch would remain parked for the remainder of the weekend, including the 2011 O'Reilly Auto Parts Challenge and the 2011 AAA Texas 500. NASCAR took this action under rules that allow it to park a driver in order to ensure the "orderly conduct of the event," an action which is not appealable. Denny Hamlin and Michael McDowell stepped up to replace Busch in both the Nationwide Series and Sprint Cup series races. It was the first time since the Truck Series was launched in 1995 that NASCAR had parked a driver across all three national series, and only the third cross-series sanction in NASCAR's 64-year history. NASCAR's action mathematically eliminated Busch from contention for the Sprint Cup, though any realistic chance of him winning it ended earlier in the Chase.

Later that day, Busch issued an apology to his fans, sponsors and teammates, saying that the Texas incident was "certainly a step backward."

On November 7, NASCAR fined Busch $50,000 for "actions detrimental to stock car racing." While the sanctioning body lifted the parking directive, it placed Busch on probation for the rest of the year, saying that he would be suspended indefinitely if he committed another action "detrimental to stock car racing or to NASCAR" or "disrupts the orderly conduct of an event".

== Race results ==
Pos	Grid	No.	Driver	Team	Manufacturer	Laps	Points
1	10	2	Kevin Harvick	Kevin Harvick Incorporated	Chevrolet	148	0^{1}
2	2	3	Austin Dillon	Richard Childress Racing	Chevrolet	148	43
3	8	21	Ty Dillon	Kevin Harvick Incorporated	Chevrolet	148	41
4	7	8	Nelson Piquet Jr. #	Kevin Harvick Incorporated	Chevrolet	148	40
5	11	88	Matt Crafton	ThorSport Racing	Chevrolet	148	39
6	14	22	Joey Coulter #	Richard Childress Racing	Chevrolet	148	38
7	12	13	Johnny Sauter	ThorSport Racing	Chevrolet	148	38
8	5	4	Ricky Carmichael	Turner Motorsports	Chevrolet	148	36
9	17	7	Miguel Paludo #	Red Horse Racing	Toyota	148	35
10	6	6	Justin Lofton	Eddie Sharp Racing	Chevrolet	148	35
11	15	17	Timothy Peters	Red Horse Racing	Toyota	148	33
12	23	23	Jason White	Joe Denette Motorsports	Chevrolet	148	32
13	19	5	Todd Bodine	Randy Moss Motorsports	Toyota	148	31
14	24	9	Max Papis	Germain Racing	Toyota	148	30
15	26	39	Ryan Sieg	RSS Racing	Chevrolet	148	29
16	33	66	Ross Chastain	Turn One Racing	Chevrolet	148	28
17	18	60	Cole Whitt #	Turn One Racing	Chevrolet	146	27
18	20	20	Johanna Long #	Panhandle Motorsports	Toyota	146	26
19	1	31	James Buescher	Turner Motorsports	Chevrolet	146	26
20	36	10	Jennifer Jo Cobb	JJC Racing	Dodge	144	0^{1}
21	25	93	B. J. McLeod	RSS Racing	Chevrolet	144	23
22	27	68	Clay Greenfield	Alger Motorsports	Dodge	143	22
23	16	81	David Starr	SS-Green Light Racing	Toyota	140	21
24	28	73	Rick Crawford	Tagsby Racing	Chevrolet	101	20
25	29	55	Jake Crum	MAKE Motorsports	Chevrolet	96	0^{1}
26	40	26	Jack Smith	MB Motorsports	Ford	96	18
27	3	32	Blake Feese	Turner Motorsports	Chevrolet	54	17
28	13	29	Parker Kligerman #	Brad Keselowski Racing	Dodge	54	16
29	22	07	Johnny Chapman	SS-Green Light Racing	Toyota	45	0^{1}
30	32	74	Mike Harmon	Mike Harmon Racing	Chevrolet	27	0^{1}
31	21	62	Brendan Gaughan	Germain Racing	Toyota	20	13
32	31	0	T. J. Bell	JJC Racing	Ford	19	0^{1}
33	4	18	Kyle Busch	Kyle Busch Motorsports	Toyota	14	0^{1}
34	9	33	Ron Hornaday Jr.	Kevin Harvick Incorporated	Chevrolet	13	10
35	35	87	Chris Jones	LCS Motorsports	Chevrolet	10	0^{2}
36	30	38	Mike Garvey	RSS Racing	Chevrolet	5	0^{2}
# Rookie of the Year candidate / ^{1} Not eligible for series points / ^{2} Late entry Source:

== Standings after the race ==
Pos	Driver	Points
1	Austin Dillon	854
2	Johnny Sauter	834
3	James Buescher	826
4	Ron Hornaday Jr.	806
5	Timothy Peters	796
6	Todd Bodine	775
7	Matt Crafton	759
8	Joey Coulter	757
9	Cole Whitt	742
10	Nelson Piquet Jr.	712
