= 2023 Alsco Uniforms 300 (Las Vegas) =

3rd race of the 2023 NASCAR Xfinity Series

Race details
- Race 3 of 33 of the 2023 NASCAR Xfinity Series
- Date: March 4, 2023
- Official name: 27th Annual Alsco Uniforms 300
- Location: Las Vegas Motor Speedway, North Las Vegas, Nevada
- Course: Permanent racing facility
- Course length: 1.5 miles (2.4 km)
- Distance: 200 laps, 300 mi (482 km)
- Scheduled distance: 200 laps, 300 mi (482 km)
- Average speed: 136.519 mph (219.706 km/h)

Pole position
Driver	Chandler Smith	Kaulig Racing
- Time: 29.489

Most laps led
Driver	Chandler Smith	Kaulig Racing
- Laps: 118

Winner
No. 21	Austin Hill	Richard Childress Racing

Television in the United States
- Network: FS1
- Announcers: Adam Alexander, Kevin Harvick, and Ryan Blaney

Radio in the United States
- Radio: MRN

The 2023 Alsco Uniforms 300 was the 3rd stock car race of the 2023 NASCAR Xfinity Series, and the 27th iteration of the event. The race was held on Saturday, March 4, 2023, in North Las Vegas, Nevada at Las Vegas Motor Speedway, a 1.5 miles (2.4 km) permanent tri-oval shaped racetrack. The race took the scheduled 200 laps to complete. Austin Hill, driving for Richard Childress Racing, made a last lap pass on Chandler Smith for the lead, and earned his fourth career NASCAR Xfinity Series win, along with his second of the season. Smith dominated the race in general, leading 118 laps. To fill out the podium, Justin Allgaier, driving for JR Motorsports, and Smith, driving for Kaulig Racing, would finish second and third, respectively.

== Background ==
Las Vegas Motor Speedway, located in Clark County, Nevada outside the Las Vegas city limits and about 15 miles northeast of the Las Vegas Strip, is a 1,200-acre (490 ha) complex of multiple tracks for motorsports racing. The complex is owned by Speedway Motorsports, Inc., which is headquartered in Charlotte, North Carolina.

=== Entry list ===
- (R) denotes rookie driver.
- (i) denotes driver who is ineligible for series driver points.

#	Driver	Team	Make
00	Cole Custer	Stewart-Haas Racing	Ford
1	Sam Mayer	JR Motorsports	Chevrolet
02	Kyle Weatherman	Our Motorsports	Chevrolet
2	Sheldon Creed	Richard Childress Racing	Chevrolet
4	Bayley Currey	JD Motorsports	Chevrolet
6	Brennan Poole	JD Motorsports	Chevrolet
07	Blaine Perkins (R)	SS-Green Light Racing	Chevrolet
7	Justin Allgaier	JR Motorsports	Chevrolet
08	Gray Gaulding	SS-Green Light Racing	Ford
8	Josh Berry	JR Motorsports	Chevrolet
9	Brandon Jones	JR Motorsports	Chevrolet
10	Kyle Busch (i)	Kaulig Racing	Chevrolet
11	Daniel Hemric	Kaulig Racing	Chevrolet
16	Chandler Smith (R)	Kaulig Racing	Chevrolet
18	Sammy Smith (R)	Joe Gibbs Racing	Toyota
19	Joe Graf Jr.	Joe Gibbs Racing	Toyota
20	John Hunter Nemechek	Joe Gibbs Racing	Toyota
21	Austin Hill	Richard Childress Racing	Chevrolet
24	Tyler Reddick (i)	Sam Hunt Racing	Toyota
25	Brett Moffitt	AM Racing	Ford
26	Kaz Grala	Sam Hunt Racing	Toyota
27	Jeb Burton	Jordan Anderson Racing	Chevrolet
28	Alex Labbé	RSS Racing	Ford
31	Parker Retzlaff (R)	Jordan Anderson Racing	Chevrolet
35	Joey Gase	Emerling-Gase Motorsports	Toyota
38	Kyle Sieg	RSS Racing	Ford
39	Ryan Sieg	RSS Racing	Ford
43	Ryan Ellis	Alpha Prime Racing	Chevrolet
44	Jeffrey Earnhardt	Alpha Prime Racing	Chevrolet
45	Rajah Caruth (i)	Alpha Prime Racing	Chevrolet
48	Parker Kligerman	Big Machine Racing	Chevrolet
51	Jeremy Clements	Jeremy Clements Racing	Chevrolet
53	C. J. McLaughlin	Emerling-Gase Motorsports	Chevrolet
66	Mason Maggio (i)	MBM Motorsports	Ford
74	Ryan Vargas	CHK Racing	Chevrolet
78	Anthony Alfredo	B. J. McLeod Motorsports	Chevrolet
91	Josh Bilicki (i)	DGM Racing	Chevrolet
92	Josh Williams	DGM Racing	Chevrolet
98	Riley Herbst	Stewart-Haas Racing	Ford
99	Garrett Smithley	B. J. McLeod Motorsports	Chevrolet
Official entry list

== Practice ==
The first and only practice session was held on Friday, March 3, at 3:30 PM PST, and last for 30 minutes. Daniel Hemric, driving for Kaulig Racing, would set the fastest time in the session, with a lap of 30.216, and an average speed of 178.713 mph (287.611 km/h).

Pos.	#	Driver	Team	Make	Time	Speed
1	11	Daniel Hemric	Kaulig Racing	Chevrolet	30.216	178.713
2	9	Brandon Jones	JR Motorsports	Chevrolet	30.251	178.506
3	00	Cole Custer	Stewart-Haas Racing	Ford	30.298	178.230
Full practice results

== Qualifying ==
Qualifying was held on Friday, March 3, at 4:00 PM PST. Since Las Vegas Motor Speedway is an intermediate racetrack, the qualifying system used is a single-car, single-lap system with only one round. In that round, whoever sets the fastest time will win the pole. Chandler Smith, driving for Kaulig Racing, would score the pole for the race, with a lap of 29.489, and an average speed of 183.119 mph (294.701 km/h).

Pos.	#	Driver	Team	Make	Time	Speed
1	16	Chandler Smith (R)	Kaulig Racing	Chevrolet	29.489	183.119
2	7	Justin Allgaier	JR Motorsports	Chevrolet	29.544	182.778
3	00	Cole Custer	Stewart-Haas Racing	Ford	29.589	182.500
4	25	Brett Moffitt	AM Racing	Ford	29.636	182.211
5	8	Josh Berry	JR Motorsports	Chevrolet	29.643	182.168
6	48	Parker Kligerman	Big Machine Racing	Chevrolet	29.767	181.409
7	20	John Hunter Nemechek	Joe Gibbs Racing	Toyota	29.798	181.220
8	11	Daniel Hemric	Kaulig Racing	Chevrolet	29.833	181.008
9	21	Austin Hill	Richard Childress Racing	Chevrolet	29.939	180.367
10	98	Riley Herbst	Stewart-Haas Racing	Ford	29.960	180.240
11	10	Kyle Busch (i)	Kaulig Racing	Chevrolet	29.974	180.156
12	2	Sheldon Creed	Richard Childress Racing	Chevrolet	29.989	180.066
13	1	Sam Mayer	JR Motorsports	Chevrolet	30.009	179.946
14	18	Sammy Smith (R)	Joe Gibbs Racing	Toyota	30.029	179.826
15	24	Tyler Reddick (i)	Sam Hunt Racing	Toyota	30.053	179.683
16	45	Rajah Caruth (i)	Alpha Prime Racing	Chevrolet	30.190	178.867
17	19	Joe Graf Jr.	Joe Gibbs Racing	Toyota	30.238	178.583
18	39	Ryan Sieg	RSS Racing	Ford	30.282	178.324
19	9	Brandon Jones	JR Motorsports	Chevrolet	30.326	178.065
20	31	Parker Retzlaff (R)	Jordan Anderson Racing	Chevrolet	30.348	177.936
21	26	Kaz Grala	Sam Hunt Racing	Toyota	30.407	177.591
22	38	Kyle Sieg	RSS Racing	Ford	30.417	177.532
23	78	Anthony Alfredo	B. J. McLeod Motorsports	Chevrolet	30.517	176.951
24	27	Jeb Burton	Jordan Anderson Racing	Chevrolet	30.558	176.713
25	51	Jeremy Clements	Jeremy Clements Racing	Chevrolet	30.648	176.194
26	02	Kyle Weatherman	Our Motorsports	Chevrolet	30.744	175.644
27	92	Josh Williams	DGM Racing	Chevrolet	30.788	175.393
28	99	Garrett Smithley	B. J. McLeod Motorsports	Chevrolet	30.903	174.740
29	4	Bayley Currey	JD Motorsports	Chevrolet	30.912	174.689
30	07	Blaine Perkins (R)	SS-Green Light Racing	Chevrolet	30.916	174.667
31	91	Josh Bilicki (i)	DGM Racing	Chevrolet	30.918	174.656
32	28	Alex Labbé	RSS Racing	Ford	30.926	174.610
33	6	Brennan Poole	JD Motorsports	Chevrolet	30.997	174.210
Qualified by owner's points
34	08	Gray Gaulding	SS-Green Light Racing	Ford	31.184	173.166
35	44	Jeffrey Earnhardt	Alpha Prime Racing	Chevrolet	31.289	172.585
36	43	Ryan Ellis	Alpha Prime Racing	Chevrolet	31.362	172.183
37	35	Joey Gase	Emerling-Gase Motorsports	Toyota	31.422	171.854
38	53	C. J. McLaughlin	Emerling-Gase Motorsports	Chevrolet	—	—
Failed to qualify
39	66	Mason Maggio (i)	MBM Motorsports	Ford	31.151	173.349
40	74	Ryan Vargas	CHK Racing	Chevrolet	31.326	172.381
Official qualifying results
Official starting lineup

== Race results ==
Stage 1 Laps: 45

Pos.	#	Driver	Team	Make	Pts
1	20	John Hunter Nemechek	Joe Gibbs Racing	Toyota	10
2	7	Justin Allgaier	JR Motorsports	Chevrolet	9
3	21	Austin Hill	Richard Childress Racing	Chevrolet	8
4	16	Chandler Smith (R)	Kaulig Racing	Chevrolet	7
5	98	Riley Herbst	Stewart-Haas Racing	Ford	6
6	11	Daniel Hemric	Kaulig Racing	Chevrolet	5
7	10	Kyle Busch (i)	Kaulig Racing	Chevrolet	0
8	18	Sammy Smith	Joe Gibbs Racing	Toyota	3
9	2	Sheldon Creed	Richard Childress Racing	Chevrolet	2
10	8	Josh Berry	JR Motorsports	Chevrolet	1

Stage 2 Laps: 45

Pos.	#	Driver	Team	Make	Pts
1	21	Austin Hill	Richard Childress Racing	Chevrolet	10
2	9	Brandon Jones	JR Motorsports	Chevrolet	9
3	10	Kyle Busch (i)	Kaulig Racing	Chevrolet	0
4	1	Sam Mayer	JR Motorsports	Chevrolet	7
5	18	Sammy Smith	Joe Gibbs Racing	Toyota	6
6	16	Chandler Smith (R)	Kaulig Racing	Chevrolet	5
7	98	Riley Herbst	Stewart-Haas Racing	Ford	4
8	00	Cole Custer	Stewart-Haas Racing	Ford	3
9	25	Brett Moffitt	AM Racing	Ford	2
10	2	Sheldon Creed	Richard Childress Racing	Chevrolet	1

Stage 3 Laps: 110

Fin	St	#	Driver	Team	Make	Laps	Led	Status	Pts
1	9	21	Austin Hill	Richard Childress Racing	Chevrolet	200	19	Running	58
2	2	7	Justin Allgaier	JR Motorsports	Chevrolet	200	10	Running	44
3	1	16	Chandler Smith (R)	Kaulig Racing	Chevrolet	200	118	Running	46
4	11	10	Kyle Busch (i)	Kaulig Racing	Chevrolet	200	4	Running	0
5	5	8	Josh Berry	JR Motorsports	Chevrolet	200	2	Running	33
6	7	20	John Hunter Nemechek	Joe Gibbs Racing	Toyota	200	45	Running	41
7	13	1	Sam Mayer	JR Motorsports	Chevrolet	200	1	Running	37
8	10	98	Riley Herbst	Stewart-Haas Racing	Ford	200	0	Running	39
9	12	2	Sheldon Creed	Richard Childress Racing	Chevrolet	200	0	Running	31
10	8	11	Daniel Hemric	Kaulig Racing	Chevrolet	200	0	Running	32
11	6	48	Parker Kligerman	Big Machine Racing	Chevrolet	200	0	Running	26
12	3	00	Cole Custer	Stewart-Haas Racing	Ford	200	0	Running	28
13	15	24	Tyler Reddick (i)	Sam Hunt Racing	Toyota	199	0	Running	0
14	24	27	Jeb Burton	Jordan Anderson Racing	Chevrolet	199	0	Running	23
15	17	19	Joe Graf Jr.	Joe Gibbs Racing	Toyota	199	0	Running	22
16	26	02	Kyle Weatherman	Our Motorsports	Chevrolet	199	0	Running	21
17	14	18	Sammy Smith (R)	Joe Gibbs Racing	Toyota	199	0	Running	29
18	32	28	Alex Labbé	RSS Racing	Ford	199	0	Running	19
19	23	78	Anthony Alfredo	B. J. McLeod Motorsports	Chevrolet	198	1	Running	18
20	22	38	Kyle Sieg	RSS Racing	Ford	198	0	Running	17
21	19	9	Brandon Jones	JR Motorsports	Chevrolet	198	0	Running	25
22	4	25	Brett Moffitt	AM Racing	Ford	198	0	Running	17
23	21	26	Kaz Grala	Sam Hunt Racing	Toyota	198	0	Running	14
24	18	39	Ryan Sieg	RSS Racing	Ford	197	0	Running	13
25	25	51	Jeremy Clements	Jeremy Clements Racing	Chevrolet	197	0	Running	12
26	16	45	Rajah Caruth (i)	Alpha Prime Racing	Chevrolet	197	0	Running	0
27	36	43	Ryan Ellis	Alpha Prime Racing	Chevrolet	197	0	Running	10
28	29	4	Bayley Currey	JD Motorsports	Chevrolet	197	0	Running	9
29	35	44	Jeffrey Earnhardt	Alpha Prime Racing	Chevrolet	197	0	Running	8
30	27	92	Josh Williams	DGM Racing	Chevrolet	197	0	Running	7
31	31	91	Josh Bilicki (i)	DGM Racing	Chevrolet	196	0	Running	0
32	34	08	Gray Gaulding	SS-Green Light Racing	Ford	196	0	Running	5
33	33	6	Brennan Poole	JD Motorsports	Chevrolet	196	0	Running	4
34	38	53	Patrick Emerling (Note: Patrick Emerling replaced C. J. McLaughlin in the 53 car after McLaughlin crashed in practice. The team used a backup car from MBM Motorsports, which was the same car that Mason Maggio failed to qualify, but renumbered to the 53.)	Emerling-Gase Motorsports	Ford	194	0	Running	3
35	30	07	Blaine Perkins (R)	SS-Green Light Racing	Chevrolet	192	0	Running	2
36	28	99	Garrett Smithley	B. J. McLeod Motorsports	Chevrolet	187	0	Running	1
37	20	31	Parker Retzlaff (R)	Jordan Anderson Racing	Chevrolet	186	0	Running	1
38	37	35	Joey Gase	Emerling-Gase Motorsports	Toyota	156	0	Fuel Pump	1
Official race results

== Standings after the race ==
Drivers' Championship standings

	Pos	Driver	Points
	1	Austin Hill	156
1	2	Justin Allgaier	135 (-21)
1	3	John Hunter Nemechek	132 (–24)
	4	Chandler Smith	122 (–34)
	5	Riley Herbst	112 (–44)
1	6	Sam Mayer	95 (–61)
1	7	Cole Custer	88 (–68)
1	8	Josh Berry	85 (–71)
1	9	Joe Graf Jr.	78 (–78)
1	10	Parker Kligerman	77 (–79)
4	11	Sammy Smith	73 (–83)
1	12	Jeb Burton	71 (–85)
Official driver's standings

- Note: Only the first 12 positions are included for the driver standings.

Previous race: 2023 Production Alliance Group 300	NASCAR Xfinity Series; 2023 season	Next race: 2023 United Rentals 200
