= RSS Racing =

American stock car racing team

- Owner(s): Rod Sieg; Pamela Sieg
- Base: Sugar Hill, Georgia
- Series: NASCAR O'Reilly Auto Parts Series
- Race drivers: 22. Jeb Burton; 28. Kyle Sieg; 38. TBA (part-time); 39. Ryan Sieg
- Manufacturer: Chevrolet
- Opened: 2009

Career
- Debut: O'Reilly Auto Parts Series: 2013 Indiana 250 (Indianapolis); Camping World Truck Series: 2009 Copart 200 (Milwaukee); ARCA Menards Series: 2021 Lucas Oil 200 (Daytona); ARCA Menards Series East: 2021 General Tire 125 (Dover); ARCA Menards Series West: 2021 General Tire 150 (Phoenix)
- Latest race: O'Reilly Auto Parts Series: 2026 O'Reilly Auto Parts 300 (Homestead); Camping World Truck Series: 2015 Hyundai Construction Equipment 200 (Atlanta); ARCA Menards Series: 2021 Reese's 150 (Kansas); ARCA Menards Series East: 2021 Bush's Beans 200 (Bristol); ARCA Menards Series West: 2021 General Tire 150 (Phoenix)
- Races competed: Total: 547; O'Reilly Auto Parts Series: 426; Camping World Truck Series: 107; ARCA Menards Series: 11; ARCA Menards Series East: 2 ARCA Menards Series West: 1
- Drivers' Championships: Total: 0 O'Reilly Auto Parts Series: 0 Camping World Truck Series: 0 ARCA Menards Series: 0 ARCA Menards Series East: 0 ARCA Menards Series West: 0
- Race victories: Total: 2 O'Reilly Auto Parts Series: 2 Camping World Truck Series: 0 ARCA Menards Series: 0 ARCA Menards Series East: 0 ARCA Menards Series West: 0
- Pole positions: Total: 1 O'Reilly Auto Parts Series: 1 Camping World Truck Series: 0 ARCA Menards Series East: 0 ARCA Menards Series West: 0

Ryan Scott Sieg Racing (shortened to RSS Racing, also known as Ryan Shane Sieg Racing) is an American professional stock car racing team that currently competes in the NASCAR O'Reilly Auto Parts Series. The team is owned by Rod Sieg and Pamela Sieg. The team currently fields three Chevrolet SS teams: the No. 22 full-time for Jeb Burton, No. 28 full-time for Kyle Sieg, the No. 39 full-time for Ryan Sieg, and the No. 38 part-time for multiple drivers, with a technical alliance with Haas Factory Team.

== Equipment ==
RSS Racing purchased rolling chassis from Kevin Harvick Incorporated until KHI's shutdown. The team formerly used Earnhardt Childress Racing engines; RSS Racing used engines from Pro Motor Engines from 2013 to 2018. In 2019 the team signed a new deal with ECR Engines, and also purchased chassis from Richard Childress Racing over the offseason.

The team began running Roush-Yates Engines-powered Ford Mustangs in 2021.

In November 2025, RSS Racing switched back to Chevrolet while retaining its technical alliance with Haas Factory Team.

== O'Reilly Auto Parts Series ==
=== Car No. 22 history ===
On October 6, 2026, Jeb Burton announced that he will move to RSS Racing in the No. 22 Chevrolet in 2027.

=== Car No. 23 history ===
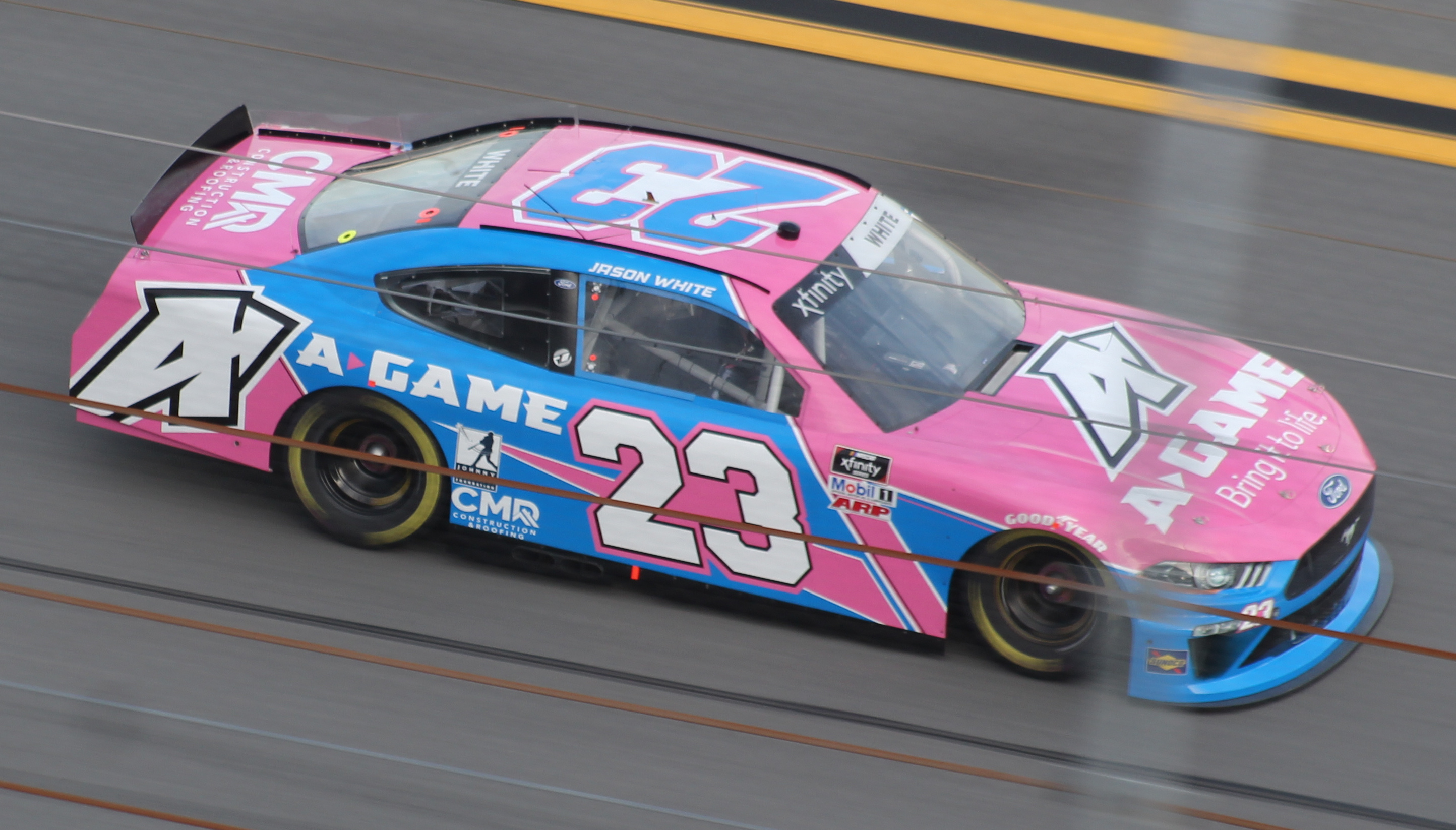
Jason White in the No. 23

Starting in 2021, RSS fielded the No. 23 entry in collaboration with Reaume Brothers Racing. Jason White drove this car at Daytona, Natalie Decker drove at Daytona RC, lastly Tyler Reddick drove it at Homestead with Our Motorsports taking over the No. 23 entry after that.

==== Car No. 23 results ====
Year	Driver	No.	Make	1	2	3	4	5	6	7	8	9	10	11	12	13	14	15	16	17	18	19	20	21	22	23	24	25	26	27	28	29	30	31	32	33	NXSC	Pts
2021	Jason White	23	Ford	DAY; 10																																		
2021	Natalie Decker	23	Chevy		DAY; 40																																	
2021	Tyler Reddick	23	Chevy			HOM; 40	LVS	PHO	ATL	MAR	TAL	DAR	DOV	COA	CLT	MOH	TEX	NSH	POC	ROA	ATL	NHA	GLN	IRC	MCH	DAY	DAR	RCH	BRI	LVS	TAL	ROV	TEX	KAN	MAR	PHO		

=== Car No. 28 history ===
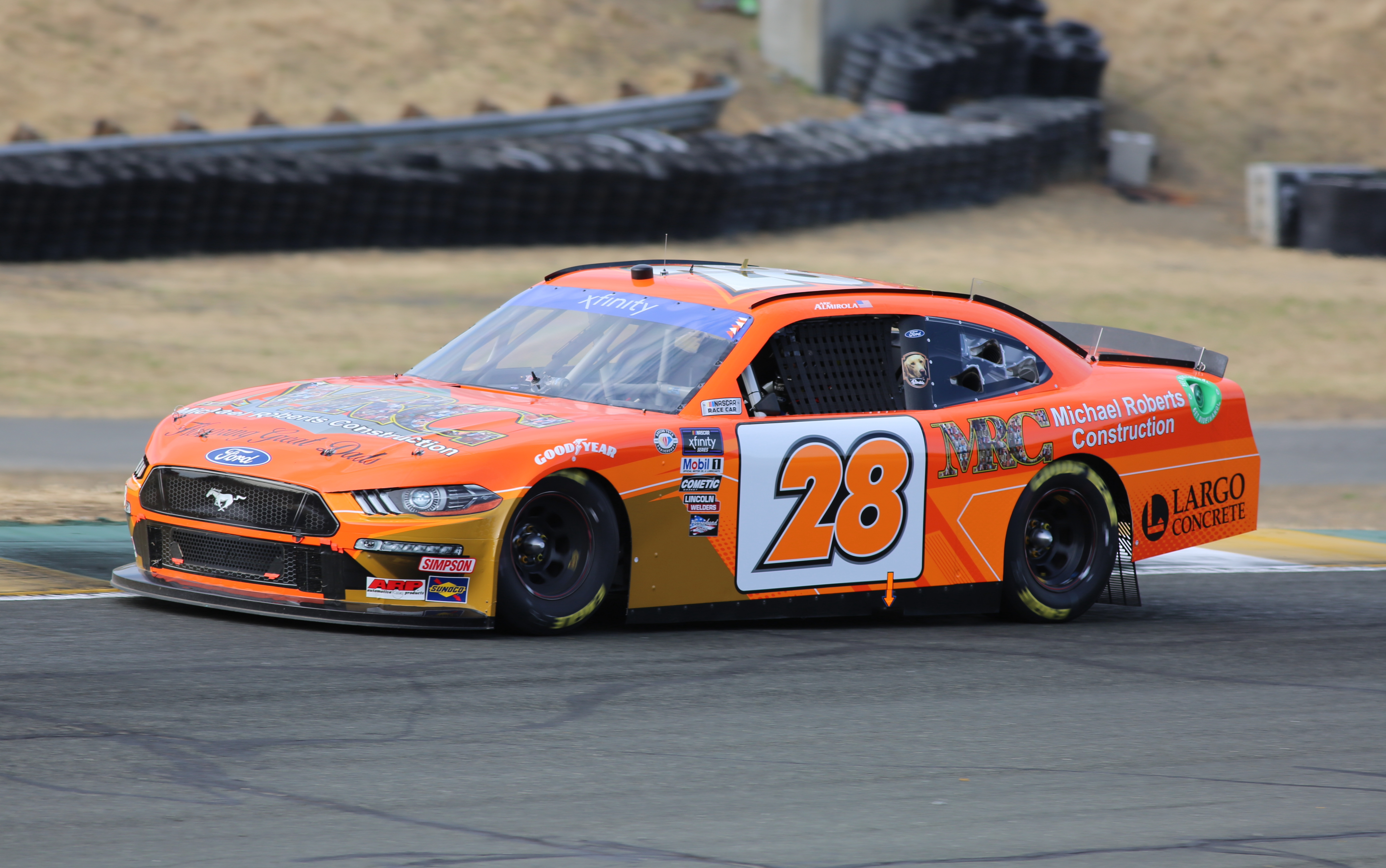
Aric Almirola's race-winning car at Sonoma Raceway in 2023

In 2022, Kyle Sieg would drive the No. 28 RSS Racing Ford part-time, the same number he drove in the ARCA series last year. C. J. McLaughlin would drive the 28 at Las Vegas. Patrick Gallagher would drive at COTA and finish 22nd. Natalie Decker would drive at Martinsville. McLaughlin would drive at Talladega but fail to qualify. Kyle will drive the No. 28 in the majority of the 2023 races. Alex Labbé would drive the 28 in the Production Alliance Group 300 and in the Alsco Uniforms 300 while Sieg was in the 38, finishing 28th and eighteenth.

For 2023, the No. 28 was shared between Kyle Sieg, Labbé, Aric Almirola, and Brent Sherman. Almirola won the inaugural Sonoma Xfinity race, giving RSS its first win.

Kyle Sieg was announced to return to the 28 and drive the car full-time in 2024. Kaz Grala entered in the race at COTA, but failed to qualify. Following Talladega in the fall, Ryan Sieg swapped numbers with Kyle Sieg, meaning Ryan would pilot the No. 28 for the rest of the year.

Kyle Sieg continued to drive the No. 28 for 2025. At Portland, Joey Hand drove the No. 28 to a 19th-place finish. At the season-finale at Phoenix, Nick Leitz drove the No. 28 while Kyle drove the No. 39.

Kyle Sieg started the 2026 season with a 15th-place finish at Daytona.

==== Car No. 28 results ====
Year	Driver	No.	Make	1	2	3	4	5	6	7	8	9	10	11	12	13	14	15	16	17	18	19	20	21	22	23	24	25	26	27	28	29	30	31	32	33	NXSC	Pts
2022	Kyle Sieg	28	Ford	DAY; 21	CAL; 18		PHO; 32	ATL; 24		RCH; 37						CLT; DNQ	PIR							MCH; 21	GLN								LVS; 26	HOM; 35	MAR	PHO	42nd	
2022	C. J. McLaughlin	28	Ford			LVS; 24						TAL; DNQ	DOV	DAR	TEX											DAY; DNQ	DAR	KAN	BRI	TEX	TAL	CLT					42nd	
2022	Patrick Gallagher	28	Ford						COA; 22																												42nd	
2022	Natalie Decker	28	Ford								MAR; 35																										42nd	
2022	Parker Retzlaff	28	Ford															NSH; 12	ROA	ATL	NHA	POC	IND														42nd	
2023	Kyle Sieg	28	Ford	DAY; 21			PHO; 25	ATL; 26	COA; 26	RCH; 20	MAR; 35	TAL; 15	DOV; 29	DAR; 30	CLT; 11	POR; 34				ATL; 7	NHA; 23	POC; 16	ROA; 32	MCH; 19	IRC; 30	GLN; 19	DAY; 13	DAR; 35		BRI; 21		ROV; 32					22nd	479
2023	Alex Labbé	28	Ford		CAL; 28	LVS; 18																															22nd	479
2023	Aric Almirola	28	Ford														SON; 1																				22nd	479
2023	Zane Smith	28	Ford															NSH; 7																			22nd	479
2023	Brent Sherman	28	Ford																CSC; 34																		22nd	479
2023	C. J. McLaughlin	28	Ford																										KAN; 22		TEX; 25		LVS; 29	HOM; 37	MAR; 13		22nd	479
2023	Joe Graf Jr.	28	Ford																																	PHO; 31	22nd	479
2024	Kyle Sieg	28	Ford	DAY; DNQ	ATL; 36	LVS; 20	PHO; 25		RCH; 23	MAR; 23	TEX; 14	TAL; 13	DOV; 27	DAR; 32	CLT; 19	PIR; 18	SON; 22	IOW; 19	NHA; 31	NSH; 26	CSC; 22	POC; 20	IND; 22	MCH; 28	DAY; 15	DAR; 22	ATL; 16	GLN; 37	BRI; 23	KAN; 24	TAL; 10						23rd	509
2024	Kaz Grala	28	Ford					COA; DNQ																													23rd	509
2024	Ryan Sieg	28	Ford																													ROV; 17	LVS; 2	HOM; 7	MAR; 15	PHO; 23	23rd	509
2025	Kyle Sieg	28	Ford	DAY; 36	ATL; 33	COA; 27	PHO; 18	LVS; 11	HOM; 27	MAR; 35	DAR; 30	BRI; 22	CAR; 20	TAL; 23	TEX; 22	CLT; 33	NSH; 26	MXC; 28	POC; 25	ATL; 9	CSC; 20	SON; 25	DOV; 36	IND; 16	IOW; 18	GLN; 30	DAY; 27		GTW; 24	BRI; 21	KAN; 17	ROV; 33	LVS; 21	TAL; 15	MAR; 21		27th	462
2025	Joey Hand	28	Ford																									PIR; 19									27th	462
2025	Nick Leitz	28	Ford																																	PHO; 20	27th	462
2026	Kyle Sieg	28	Chevy	DAY; 15	ATL; 37	COA; 24	PHO; 24	LVS; 14	DAR; 37	MAR; 34	ROC; 37	BRI; 25	KAN; 25	TAL; 18	TEX; 30	GLN; 31	DOV; 17	CLT; 19	NSH; 24	POC; 32	COR; 37	SON; 31	CHI; 30	ATL; 8	IND; 24	IOW; 12	DAY; 21	DAR; 16	GTW; 9	BRI; 20	LVS; 20	CLT; 35	PHO; 25	TAL; 28	MAR; 21	HOM; 11	28th	436

=== Car No. 29 history ===
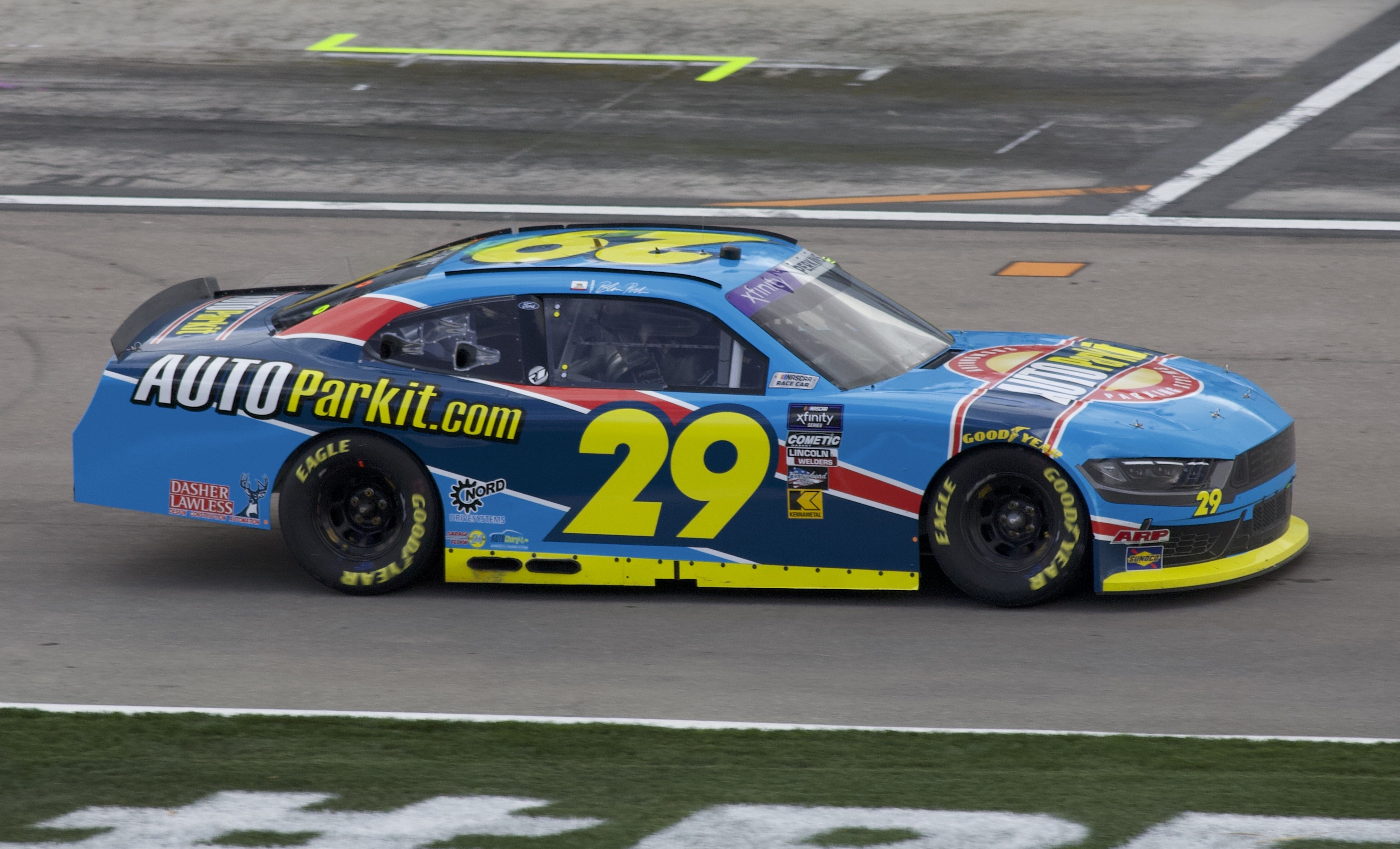
Blaine Perkins in the No. 29 car at Las Vegas Motor Speedway in 2024.

In 2023, Kyle Sieg would drive a fourth entry, the No. 29, in the race at Sonoma, due to the fact that Aric Almirola had a one race deal to take over the No. 28. Later, it was announced that Alex Labbé would drive the car instead of Sieg.

On December 18, 2023, it was announced that Blaine Perkins would compete full-time for RSS in 2024, driving the No. 29.

In 2025, J. J. Yeley would attempt to qualify at Daytona in the No. 29. However, he failed to qualify for the race. Jake Garcia would attempt to make his NASCAR Xfinity Series debut at Talladega Superspeedway in the No. 29. Unfortunately, Garcia failed to qualify.

==== Car No. 29 results ====
Year	Driver	No.	Make	1	2	3	4	5	6	7	8	9	10	11	12	13	14	15	16	17	18	19	20	21	22	23	24	25	26	27	28	29	30	31	32	33	NXSC	Pts
2023	Alex Labbé	29	Ford	DAY	CAL	LVS	PHO	ATL	COA	RCH	MAR	TAL	DOV	DAR	CLT	PIR	SON; 25																				41st	90
2023	Kyle Sieg	29	Ford															NSH; 25	CSC	ATL	NHA	POC	ROA	MCH	IRC	GLN	DAY	DAR	KAN; 20	BRI	TEX; 12	ROV	LVS; 18		MAR; 38	PHO; Wth	41st	90
2023	Mason Maggio	29	Ford																															HOM; 33			41st	90
2024	Blaine Perkins	29	Ford	DAY; 14	ATL; 30	LVS; 31	PHO; 13	COA; 22	RCH; 33	MAR; 16	TEX; 35	TAL; 23	DOV; 36	DAR; 27	CLT; 35	PIR; 20	SON; 18	IOW; 35	NHA; 27	NSH; 35	CSC; 24	POC; 34	IND; 29	MCH; 23	DAY; 14	DAR; 34	ATL; 19	GLN; DNQ	BRI; 22	KAN; 28	TAL; 18	ROV; 33	LVS; 31	HOM; 34	MAR; 19	PHO; 22	33rd	350
2025	J. J. Yeley	29	Ford	DAY; DNQ	ATL	COA	PHO	LVS	HOM	MAR	DAR	BRI	CAR																								50th	0
2025	Jake Garcia	29	Ford											TAL; DNQ	TEX	CLT	NSH	MXC	POC	ATL	CSC	SON	DOV	IND	IOW	GLN	DAY	PIR	GTW	BRI	KAN	ROV	LVS	TAL	MAR	PHO	50th	0

=== Car No. 37 history ===
J. J. Yeley drove the No. 37 car in the 2018 Kansas Lottery 300 at Kansas Speedway, start-and-parking the car. Jeff Green drove the No. 37 car at the Ford EcoBoost 300 at Homestead, also start-and-parking the car.

==== Car No. 37 results ====
Year	Driver	No.	Make	1	2	3	4	5	6	7	8	9	10	11	12	13	14	15	16	17	18	19	20	21	22	23	24	25	26	27	28	29	30	31	32	33	NXSC	Pts
2018	J. J. Yeley	37	Chevy	DAY	ATL	LVS	PHO	CAL	TEX	BRI	RCH	TAL	DOV	CLT	POC	MCH	IOW	CHI	DAY	KEN	NHA	IOW	GLN	MOH	BRI	ROA	DAR	IND	LVS	RCH	CLT	DOV	KAN; 35	TEX	PHO		54th	3
2018	Jeff Green	37	Chevy																																	HOM; 39	54th	3

=== Car No. 38 history ===
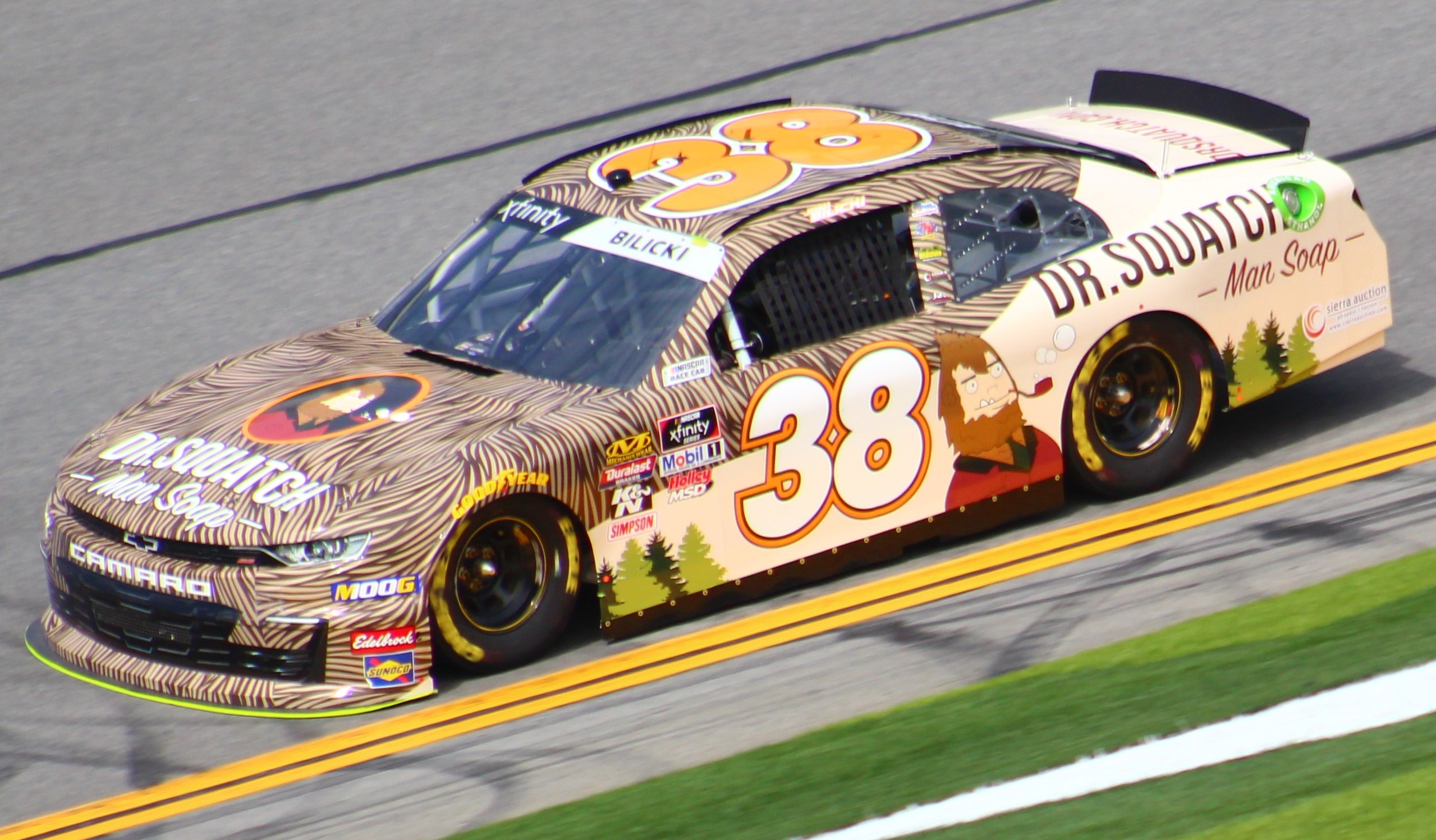
Josh Bilicki in the No. 38 at Daytona in 2019

Gray Gaulding drove a No. 38 entry during the 2017 Drive Sober 200 at Dover, starting-and-parking the car. Jeff Green would then drive the car at Charlotte and Kansas. The team became full-time in 2018. Green would drive the season opener without start and parking only in superspeedways include Daytona and Talladega. Green finished an outstanding eleventh place, the best finish with the number 38 car. Green start-and-parked the next two races at Atlanta and Las Vegas. J. J. Yeley then took over the car, finishing 21st at ISM Raceway, and 34th at Auto Club Speedway. Yeley and Green continued to be the team's primary drivers, and they start and parked about half of the time. Ryan Sieg made two starts in the car, with Brian Henderson & Angela Ruch making one apiece. Yeley's best finish was an eleventh at Talladega and Las Vegas, and Green's best finish was once again an eleventh, this time at the season opener. Sieg finished fifteenth at Bristol Motor Speedway and 22nd at Homestead-Miami Speedway. Henderson finished eighteenth at Road America and Ruch finished 29th at Kansas Speedway. In 2019, Yeley and Green continued to be the team's primary drivers, with C. J. McLaughlin, Bayley Currey and Josh Bilicki coming on board for a limited schedule. This time the team started-and-parked at all tracks other than Daytona International Speedway. For the season opener at Daytona, Josh Bilicki was the driver, and he finished 23rd. At the Daytona night race, Green drove the car to a seventh place finish. In 2020 the No. 38 showed up for the season opener with Jeff Green, but was replaced with Ross Chastain after Chastain failed to qualify in his No. 10 Kaulig Racing ride. He finished 22nd, six laps down. The No. 38 didn't return until the fall Talladega race, where Green finished 29th. The No. 38 car returned to the 2021 Championship race at Phoenix with RSS regular Ryan Sieg behind the wheel, while his younger brother Kyle Sieg would drive the No. 39.

In 2022, C. J. McLaughlin, Joe Graf Jr., Kyle Sieg, Parker Retzlaff, Loris Hezemans, Will Rodgers, Ryan Sieg, Darren Dilley and Patrick Gallagher would split the seat time in the No. 38 RSS Racing Ford. Timmy Hill was due to run in the Production Alliance Group 300, but was replaced by Graf. In the United Rentals 200 an eighteen-year old Retzlaff made his debut and qualified in sixth place before retiring from the race with a fuel pump problem on lap 158. In the Pacific Office Automation 147, road course ringer Darren Dilley made his debut.

In 2023, Graf drove a majority of the races in the No. 38, and finished 30th in points. Ryan and Kyle Sieg along with Chris Hacker and Nick Leitz also drove the entry.

==== Collaboration with Viking Motorsports ====
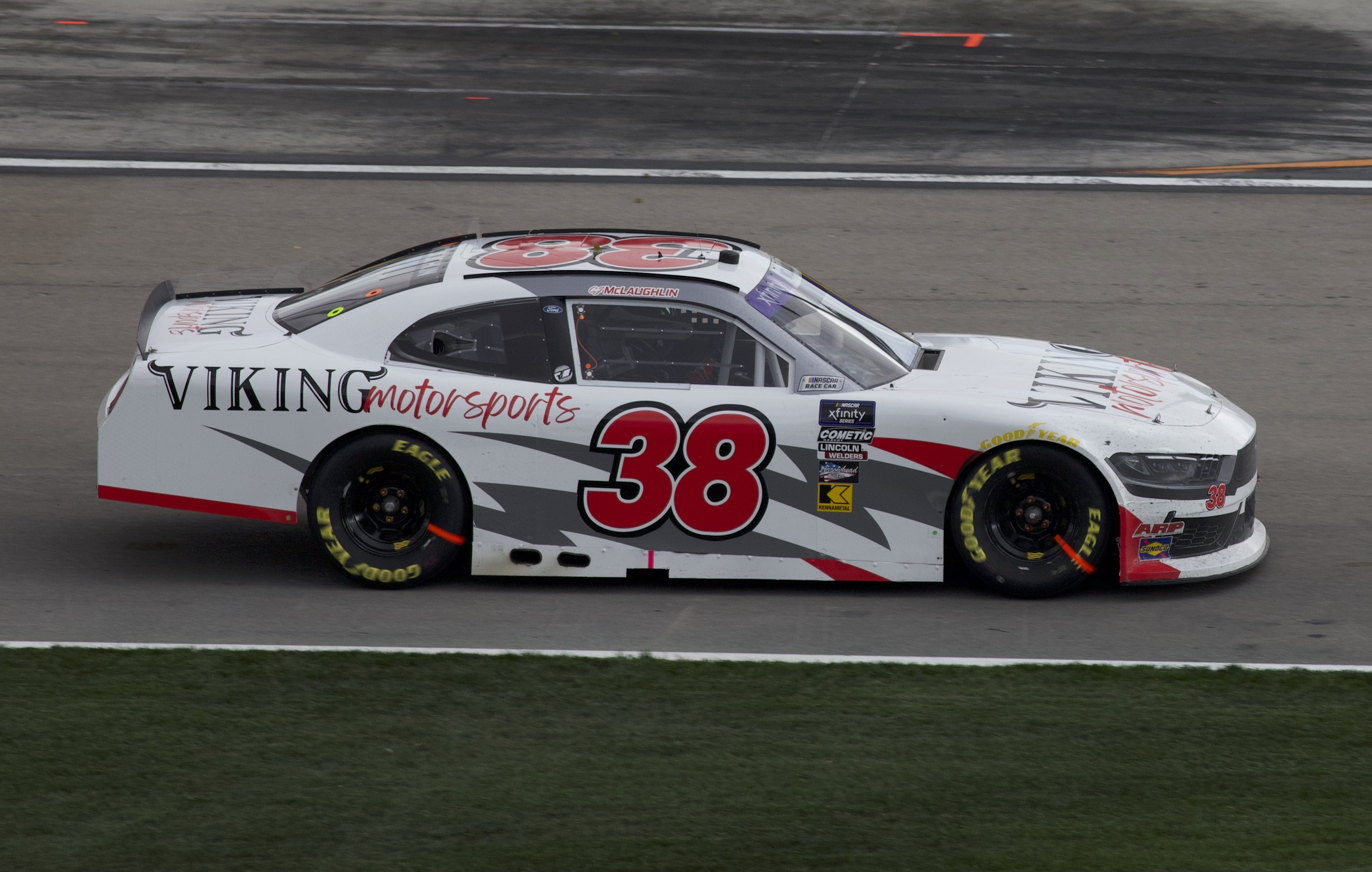
C. J. McLaughlin in the No. 38 car at Las Vegas Motor Speedway in 2024.

On January 12, 2024, it was announced that C. J. McLaughlin would drive the No. 38 car part-time for the team. After failing to qualify in two of the first four races, McLaughlin was replaced by Matt DiBenedetto for at least five races. It was also revealed that the entry was being fielded by Viking Motorsports, owned by Don Sackett, CEO of SciAps Inc., in collaboration with RSS Racing.

The crew chief, crew, and hauler were supplied by RSS Racing, while the driver, car, and spotter were provided by Viking Motorsports. The entry was officially entered under the RSS Racing banner, with sponsorship from Viking Motorsports, and the purse was shared between the two teams.

On December 13, 2024, Viking Motorsports announced their switch to Chevrolet as their new manufacturer, officially ending their partnership with RSS Racing.

In 2026, the No. 38 car would make a return in the season-opener at Daytona with Patrick Emerling behind the wheel. Emerling would also drive the car at Talladega and Pocono. Logan Bearden would drive the No. 38 at Dover and Atlanta. J. J. Yeley would drive the No. 38 at Charlotte, Nashville, Chicagoland, Indianapolis, Bristol night race, fall Charlotte race, and Homestead Miami. Ryan Sieg would drive the No. 38 at summer Daytona race, winning the race and giving RSS Racing their second victory in the series. Brad Perez would drive the No. 38 at second Darlington race.

==== Car No. 38 results ====
Year	Driver	No.	Make	1	2	3	4	5	6	7	8	9	10	11	12	13	14	15	16	17	18	19	20	21	22	23	24	25	26	27	28	29	30	31	32	33	NXSC	Pts
2017	Gray Gaulding	38	Chevy	DAY	ATL	LVS	PHO	CAL	TEX	BRI	RCH	TAL	CLT	DOV	POC	MCH	IOW	DAY	KEN	NHA	IND	IOW	GLN	MOH	BRI	ROA	DAR	RCH	CHI	KEN	DOV; 34						52nd	8
2017	Jeff Green	38	Chevy																													CLT; 40	KAN; 40	TEX; 37	PHO; 37	HOM; 40	52nd	8
2018	Jeff Green	38	Chevy	DAY; 11	ATL; 40	LVS; 39											IOW; 35					IOW; 35			BRI; 26												27th	356
2018	J. J. Yeley	38	Chevy				PHO; 21	CAL; 34	TEX; 31		RCH; 15	TAL; 11	DOV; 36	CLT; 36	POC; 34	MCH; 20		CHI; 18	DAY; 16	KEN; 34	NHA; 36		GLN; 34	MOH; 32			DAR; 30	IND; 30	LVS; 11	RCH; 25	CLT; 40	DOV; 33		TEX; 15	PHO; 21		27th	356
2018	Ryan Sieg	38	Chevy							BRI; 15																										HOM; 22	27th	356
2018	Brian Henderson	38	Chevy																							ROA; 18											27th	356
2018	Angela Ruch	38	Chevy																														KAN; 29				27th	356
2019	Josh Bilicki	38	Chevy	DAY; 23	ATL; 34																NHA; DNQ																39th	94
2019	Jeff Green	38	Chevy			LVS; 32	PHO; 33	CAL; 36	TEX; 38	BRI; 34	RCH; 38	TAL; 35	DOV; 36	CLT; 37	POC; 36	MCH; 36	IOW; 37	CHI; 37	DAY; 7	KEN; 36																	39th	94
2019	J. J. Yeley	38	Chevy																			IOW; 38	GLN; 35	MOH; 37		ROA; 38	DAR; 36	IND; 38	LVS; 37				KAN; 37	TEX; 38	PHO; 37	HOM; 36	39th	94
2019	Camden Murphy	38	Chevy																						BRI; DNQ												39th	94
2019	C. J. McLaughlin	38	Chevy																											RCH; 31							39th	94
2019	Bayley Currey	38	Chevy																												CLT; 37	DOV; 33					39th	94
2020	Jeff Green	38	Chevy	DAY; QL	LVS	CAL	PHO	DAR	CLT	BRI	ATL	HOM	HOM	TAL; 29	POC	IND	KEN	KEN	TEX	KAN	ROA	DAY	DOV	DOV	DAY	DAR	RCH	RCH	BRI	LVS	TAL	CLT	KAN	TEX	MAR	PHO	42nd	27
2020	Ross Chastain	38	Chevy	DAY; 22																																	42nd	27
2021	Ryan Sieg	38	Ford	DAY	DAY	HOM	LVS	PHO	ATL	MAR	TAL	DAR	DOV	COA	CLT	MOH	TEX	NSH	POC	ROA	ATL	NHA	GLN	IND	MCH	DAY	DAR	RCH	BRI	LVS	TAL	CLT	TEX	KAN	MAR	PHO; 17	44th	20
2022	C. J. McLaughlin	38	Ford	DAY; 35											TEX; 25	CLT; 23					NHA; 13			MCH; 37				KAN; 34	BRI; 24	TEX; 10	TAL; 29		LVS; 30	HOM; 31	MAR; 24		26th	429
2022	Joe Graf Jr.	38	Ford		CAL; 15																																26th	429
2022	Kyle Sieg	38	Ford			LVS; 16								DAR; 32				NSH; 25		ATL; 16		POC; 22				DAY; 10	DAR; 23									PHO; 22	26th	429
2022	Parker Retzlaff	38	Ford				PHO; 36			RCH; 10	MAR; 12		DOV; 17																								26th	429
2022	Loris Hezemans	38	Toyota					ATL; 36																													26th	429
2022	Will Rodgers	38	Toyota						COA; 37																												26th	429
2022	Ryan Sieg	38	Ford									TAL; 4																									26th	429
2022	Darren Dilley	38	Ford														PIR; 37																				26th	429
2022	Patrick Gallagher	38	Ford																ROA; 19				IND; 28		GLN; 36							CLT; 33					26th	429
2023	Ryan Sieg	38	Ford	DAY; 8																																	30th	367
2023	Kyle Sieg	38	Ford		CAL; 15	LVS; 20																												HOM; 22		PHO; 38	30th	367
2023	Joe Graf Jr.	38	Ford				PHO; 31	ATL; 25	COA; 30		MAR; 37	TAL; 20	DOV; 22	DAR; 32	CLT; 17	POR; 23	SON; 31	NSH; 21	CSC; 33	ATL; 21		POC; 17	ROA; 23	MCH; 27	IRC; 35	GLN; 22	DAY; 34	DAR; 26		BRI; 26	TEX; 36	ROV; 31	LVS; 37		MAR; 29		30th	367
2023	Chris Hacker	38	Ford							RCH; 14											NHA; 30																30th	367
2023	Nick Leitz	38	Ford																										KAN; 31								30th	367
2024	C. J. McLaughlin	38	Ford	DAY; DNQ	ATL; 35	LVS; 33	PHO; DNQ	COA																													30th	399
2024	Matt DiBenedetto	38	Ford						RCH; 18	MAR; 21	TEX; 20	TAL; 8	DOV; 32	DAR; 25	CLT; 26	PIR; 31	SON; 21	IOW; 7	NHA; 38	NSH; 29	CSC; 23	POC; 24	IND; 16	MCH; 7	DAY; 33	DAR; 19	ATL; 35	GLN; 35	BRI; 34	KAN; 14	TAL; 16	ROV; 22	LVS; 16	HOM; 38	MAR; 16	PHO; 26	30th	399
2026	Patrick Emerling	38	Chevy	DAY; 13	ATL	COA	PHO	LVS	DAR	MAR	CAR	BRI	KAN	TAL; 16	TEX	GLN				POC; 31	COR	SON												TAL; DNQ			37th	121
2026	Patrick Emerling	38	Ford																																MAR; 37		37th	121
2026	Logan Bearden	38	Ford														DOV; 35							ATL; 35													37th	121
2026	J. J. Yeley	38	Ford															CLT; 34	NSH; 38				CHI; 37		IND; 38	IOW				BRI; 38	LVS	CLT; 38	PHO			HOM; 38	37th	121
2026	Ryan Sieg	38	Chevy																								DAY; 1										37th	121
2026	Brad Perez	38	Ford																									DAR; 38	GTW								37th	121

=== Car No. 39 history ===
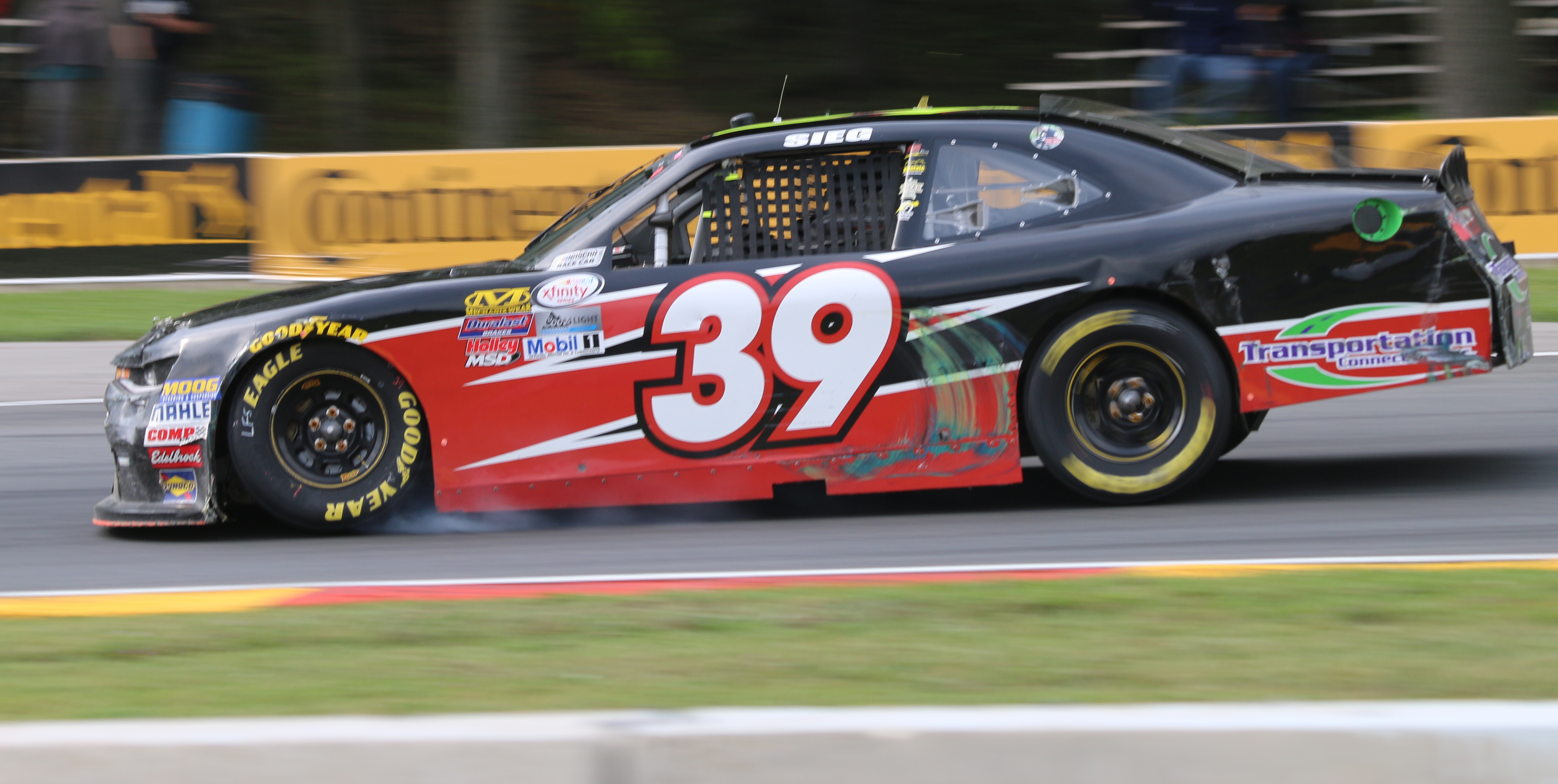
No. 39 driven by Ryan Sieg in 2017

The No. 39 car was the first entry for RSS Racing in the Xfinity Series. Ryan Sieg, son of owner Rod Sieg, was the driver for the 3 races it entered in 2013. He finished 24th at Indy, 21st at Kansas, and withdrew at Atlanta. In 2014, Sieg returned, planning to run the first 5 races, but would run for Truck points. However, after finishing ninth at Daytona, and also running well at other tracks, he declared he was running for rookie of the year and transferring his points to the Xfinity Series. After the 2014 Treatmyclot.com 300, the team was penalized due to the maximum rear body height being too high. Crew chief Kevin Starland and car chief Timothy Brown were placed on probation, the former also being fined $10,000. Sieg ran in the top-twenty for most of the races, but did well at Daytona again. Finishing third for his first top-five finish, and helped push Kasey Kahne to the victory. Sieg finished sixteenth in points. For 2015, Sieg returned with sponsorship from Uncle Bob's Self Storage. He would run well again, finishing eleventh in points and picking up an eighth place finish at Kansas. Sieg returns in 2016, picking up another third place finish at Daytona in July. The team would make the Xfinity chase but was out after Round 1. Sieg's performance dropped slightly in 2017, missing the chase and finishing fifteenth in the standings, but got a career-best second-place finish at the June Iowa race to William Byron. Stephen Leicht drove the finale race at Homestead, for Sieg to drive the No. 93 for owner points. The team started 2018 with J. J. Yeley finishing eighteenth at Daytona. Ryan Sieg took over at Atlanta Motor Speedway and drove the car up until Texas Motor Speedway. In those five races he had two top-twenties's and no DNF's, his best finish being an eighteenth at Texas Motor Speedway. J. J. Yeley start and park the No. 93 car at Bristol. Ryan Sieg once again took over for the next 25 races, posting nine top-twenties's and a best finish of sixth at Talladega. He also performed well at Kansas, finishing ninth. For the season finale at Homestead-Miami Angela Ruch drove the No. 93. Ruch start and parked, resulting in a 37th-place finish. For 2019, Ryan Sieg drove every single race in the No. 93 except for New Hampshire Motor Speedway, where C. J. McLaughlin drove. Sieg posted 25 top-twenty finishes, eleven top-ten finishes, and one top-five finish, a fourth at Daytona in February. McLaughlin finished 28th in his attempt. Before 2020, it was announced Sieg would drive the 39 full-time with CMR Construction & Roofing as his primary sponsor. Sieg nabbed seven top-five finishes, eleven top-ten finishes, and four DNF's. He made the chase and made the round of 8, but was unable to make it to the championship 4, and ended out the season tenth in points. Sieg & CMR would return in 2021.

Sieg got off to a rough start in 2021, having three DNF's in his first five races. His only top-twenty was an eighth place finish at Homestead-Miami Speedway. Following the Indianapolis race on August 14, crew chief Shane Wilson was suspended for four races after the car lost its left rear tire and caused a caution during the race. RSS Racing decided to release Wilson instead of appealing his penalty. Kyle Sieg, the younger brother of Ryan, would be in the No. 39 for the championship race at Phoenix, while Ryan would be in the No. 38.

Sieg returned in 2022 with CMR Construction & Roofing sponsorship.

At the 2023 Pennzoil 150, Sieg's car was notably without CMR sponsorship. Starting at the Wawa 250, SciAps would become Sieg's primary sponsor, the deal also featuring the 2024 season. Sieg scored three top 10s and finished 20th in points.

Sieg started the 2024 season with a 22nd place finish at Daytona. At Texas, he lost to Sam Mayer by 0.002 seconds. Following Talladega in the fall, Ryan Sieg swapped numbers with Kyle Sieg, meaning Kyle would pilot the No. 39 for the rest of the year.

Sieg started the 2025 season with a nineteenth-place finish at Daytona. Prior to the Championship race at Phoenix, Haas Factory Team announced that Sieg would replace Sam Mayer, who had been suspended for the weekend. Kyle Sieg drove the No. 39 for the final race of the season.

Sieg started the 2026 season with a 3rd-place finish at Daytona. At Iowa, Sieg won his first pole position. On August 18, it was announced that Andy Jankowiak would make his NASCAR O'Reilly Auto Parts Series debut in the No. 39 at summer Daytona race.

==== Car No. 39 results ====
Year	Driver	No.	Make	1	2	3	4	5	6	7	8	9	10	11	12	13	14	15	16	17	18	19	20	21	22	23	24	25	26	27	28	29	30	31	32	33	Owners	Pts
2013	Ryan Sieg	39	Chevy	DAY	PHO	LVS	BRI	CAL	TEX	RCH	TAL	DAR	CLT	DOV	IOW	MCH	ROA	KEN	DAY	NHA	CHI	IND; 24	IOW	GLN	MOH	BRI	ATL; Wth	RCH	CHI	KEN	DOV	KAN; 21	CLT	TEX	PHO	HOM	66th	0
2014	Ryan Sieg	39	Chevy	DAY; 9	PHO; 14	LVS; 22	BRI; 20	CAL; 22	TEX; 17	DAR; 37	RCH; 26	TAL; 20	IOW; 17	CLT; 27	DOV; 13	MCH; 13	ROA; 22	KEN; 21	DAY; 3	NHA; 18	CHI; 18	IND; 18	IOW; 20	GLN; 34	MOH; 16	BRI; 16	ATL; 20	RCH; 23	CHI; 21	KEN; 17	DOV; 14	KAN; 20	CLT; 13	TEX; 33	PHO; 20	HOM; 36	16th	682
2015	Ryan Sieg	39	Chevy	DAY; 38	ATL; 23	LVS; 21	PHO; 17	CAL; 20	TEX; 20	BRI; 17	RCH; 31	TAL; 29	IOW; 17	CLT; 24	DOV; 20	MCH; 17	CHI; 15	DAY; 27	KEN; 23	NHA; 34	IND; 12	IOW; 12	GLN; 14	MOH; 14	BRI; 16	ROA; 22	DAR; 17	RCH; 17	CHI; 18	KEN; 12	DOV; 17	CLT; 14	KAN; 8	TEX; 13	PHO; 16	HOM; 14	11th	827
2016	Ryan Sieg	39	Chevy	DAY; 20	ATL; 16	LVS; 14	PHO; 27	CAL; 29	TEX; 10	BRI; 14	RCH; 21	TAL; 20	DOV; 16	CLT; 13	POC; 29	MCH; 12	IOW; 21	DAY; 3	KEN; 20	NHA; 15	IND; 18	IOW; 15	GLN; 23	MOH; 22	BRI; 37	ROA; 14	DAR; 15	RCH; 14	CHI; 12	KEN; 16	DOV; 19	CLT; 10	KAN; 34	TEX; 13	PHO; 14	HOM; 12	9th	2171
2017	Ryan Sieg	39	Chevy	DAY; 21	ATL; 22	LVS; 18	PHO; 34	CAL; 21	TEX; 18	BRI; 21	RCH; 26	TAL; 12	CLT; 27	DOV; 16	POC; 23	MCH; 15	IOW; 2	DAY; 35	KEN; 18	NHA; 20	IND; 14	IOW; 14	GLN; 27	MOH; 12	BRI; 32	ROA; 20	DAR; 22	RCH; 26	CHI; 24	KEN; 20	DOV; 14	CLT; 18	KAN; 26	TEX; 20	PHO; 21		15th	551
2017	Stephen Leicht	39	Chevy																																	HOM; 35	15th	551
2018	Ryan Sieg	39	Chevy		ATL; 22	LVS; 29	PHO; 25	CAL; 20	TEX; 18		RCH; 21	TAL; 6	DOV; 17	CLT; 13	POC; 17	MCH; 19	IOW; 18	CHI; 20	DAY; 27	KEN; 16	NHA; 15	IOW; 34	GLN; 26	MOH; 34	BRI; 11	ROA; 26	DAR; 17	IND; 13	LVS; 12	RCH; 17	CLT; 36	DOV; 18	KAN; 9	TEX; 12	PHO; 19		16th	589
2018	J. J. Yeley	39	Chevy	DAY; 18						BRI; 37																											16th	589
2018	Angela Ruch	39	Chevy																																	HOM; 37	16th	589
2019	Ryan Sieg	39	Chevy	DAY; 4	ATL; 11	LVS; 6	PHO; 10	CAL; 11	TEX; 10	BRI; 12	RCH; 5	TAL; 16	DOV; 11	CLT; 8	POC; 26	MCH; 17	IOW; 30	CHI; 12	DAY; 24	KEN; 9		IOW; 12	GLN; 30	MOH; 16	BRI; 25	ROA; 11	DAR; 14	IND; 10	LVS; 38	RCH; 12	CLT; 30	DOV; 10	KAN; 9	TEX; 10	PHO; 13	HOM; 12	11th	2171
2019	C. J. McLaughlin	39	Chevy																		NHA; 28																11th	2171
2020	Ryan Sieg	39	Chevy	DAY; 9	LVS; 3	CAL; 4	PHO; 11	DAR; 7	CLT; 28	BRI; 16	ATL; 35	HOM; 28	HOM; 19	TAL; 30	POC; 12	IND; 17	KEN; 9	KEN; 35	TEX; 29	KAN; 4	ROA; 9	DAY; 11	DOV; 12	DOV; 14	DAY; 23	DAR; 3	RCH; 12	RCH; 15	BRI; 14	LVS; 5	TAL; 2	CLT; 21	KAN; 3	TEX; 31	MAR; 11	PHO; 31	10th	2187
2021	Ryan Sieg	39	Ford	DAY; 31	DAY; 27	HOM; 8	LVS; 38	PHO; 37	ATL; 10	MAR; 23	TAL; 5	DAR; 9	DOV; 8	COA; 25	CLT; 31	MOH; 9	TEX; 11	NSH; 16	POC; 17	ROA; 22	ATL; 12	NHA; 13	GLN; 18	IND; 32	MCH; 12	DAY; 16	DAR; 11	RCH; 13	BRI; 34	LVS; 17	TAL; 11	CLT; 32	TEX; 14	KAN; 5	MAR; 31		14th	643
2021	Kyle Sieg	39	Ford																																	PHO; 27	14th	643
2022	Ryan Sieg	39	Ford	DAY; 8	CAL; 10	LVS; 36	PHO; 11	ATL; 10	COA; 11	RCH; 9	MAR; 9		DOV; 10	DAR; 11	TEX; 35	CLT; 32	PIR; 16	NSH; 9	ROA; 10	ATL; 15	NHA; 32	POC; 15	IND; 27	MCH; 15	GLN; 13	DAY; 26	DAR; 12	KAN; 14	BRI; 10	TEX; 9	TAL; 4	CLT; 9	LVS; 38	HOM; 33	MAR; 33	PHO; 20	15th	717
2022	Kyle Sieg	39	Ford									TAL; 18																									15th	717
2023	Joe Graf Jr.	39	Ford	DAY; 7																																	20th	607
2023	Ryan Sieg	39	Ford		CAL; 14	LVS; 24	PHO; 16	ATL; 11	COA; 23	RCH; 7	MAR; 18	TAL; 22	DOV; 16	DAR; 27	CLT; 24	POR; 18	SON; 28	NSH; 19	CSC; 25	ATL; 37	NHA; 33	POC; 22	ROA; 13	MCH; 13	IRC; 32	GLN; 21	DAY; 6	DAR; 30	KAN; 30	BRI; 6	TEX; 11	ROV; 13	LVS; 16	HOM; 14	MAR; 35	PHO; 18	20th	607
2024	Ryan Sieg	39	Ford	DAY; 22	ATL; 22	LVS; 7	PHO; 12	COA; 14	RCH; 32	MAR; 17	TEX; 2	TAL; 17	DOV; 37	DAR; 13	CLT; 7	PIR; 14	SON; 20	IOW; 12	NHA; 6	NSH; 11	CSC; 16	POC; 12	IND; 11	MCH; 13	DAY; 5	DAR; 18	ATL; 32	GLN; 22	BRI; 8	KAN; 16	TAL; 2						14th	765
2024	Kyle Sieg	39	Ford																													ROV; 23	LVS; 26	HOM; 26	MAR; 21	PHO; 29	14th	765
2025	Ryan Sieg	39	Ford	DAY; 19	ATL; 20	COA; 19	PHO; 4	LVS; 7	HOM; 22	MAR; 8	DAR; 12	BRI; 7	CAR; 18*	TAL; 36	TEX; 8	CLT; 14	NSH; 21	MXC; 29	POC; 4	ATL; 30	CSC; 38	SON; 35	DOV; 6	IND; 5	IOW; 8	GLN; 28	DAY; 31*	PIR; 24	GTW; 27	BRI; 23	KAN; 19	ROV; 20	LVS; 7	TAL; 35	MAR; 15		16th	718
2025	Kyle Sieg	39	Ford																																	PHO; 12	16th	718
2026	Ryan Sieg	39	Chevy	DAY; 3	ATL; 38	COA; 16	PHO; 17	LVS; 33	DAR; 13	MAR; 9	ROC; 9	BRI; 11	KAN; 10	TAL; 21	TEX; 14	GLN; 26	DOV; 8	CLT; 7	NSH; 13	POC; 26	COR; 11	SON; 15	CHI; 31	ATL; 16	IND; 17	IOW; 33		DAR; 19	GTW; 14	BRI; 30	LVS; 12	CLT; 17	PHO; 23	TAL; 14	MAR; 11	HOM; 12	15th	710
2026	Andy Jankowiak	39	Ford																								DAY; 30										15th	710

=== Car No. 93 history ===
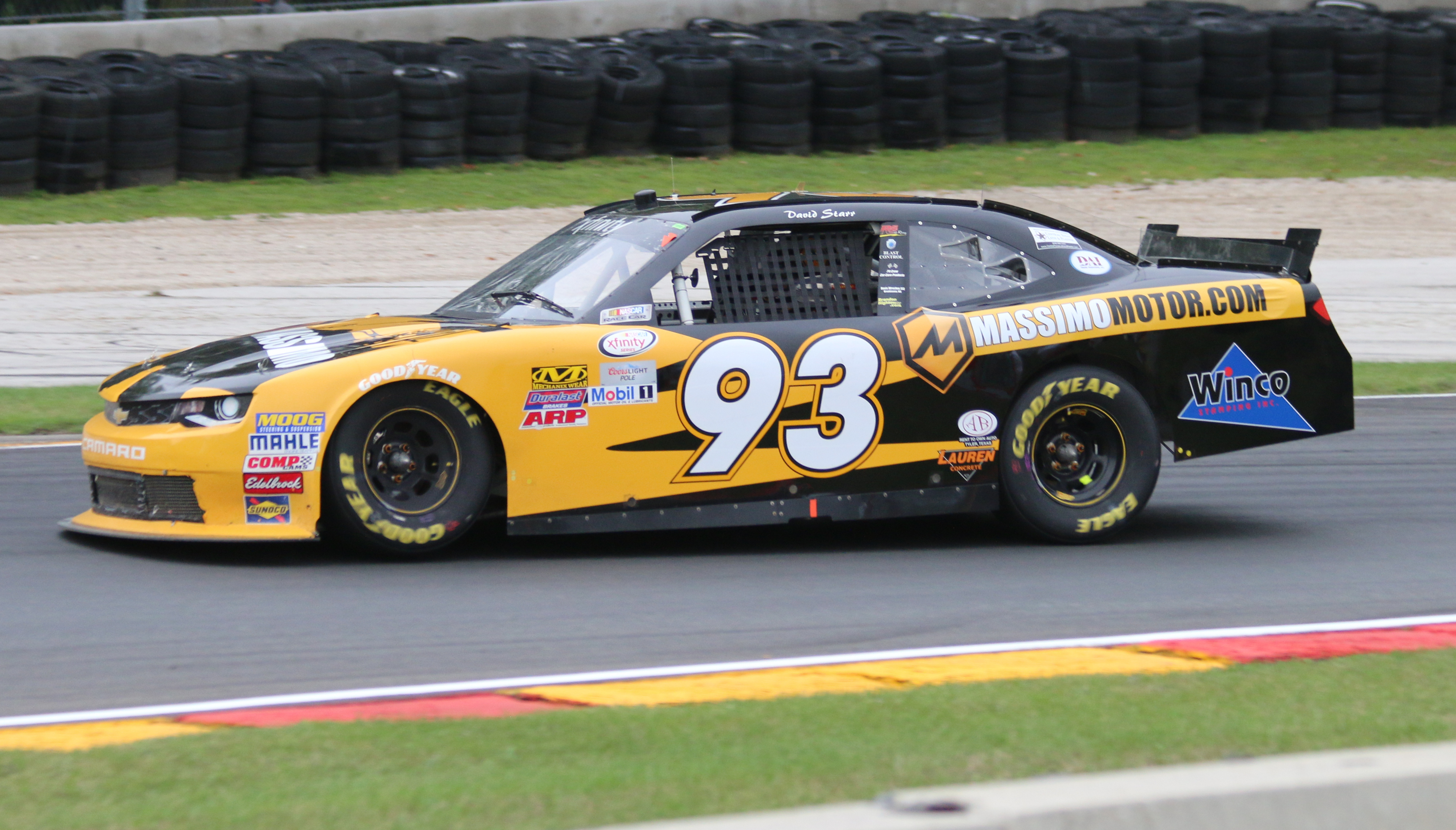
The No. 93 of David Starr at Road America in 2016

In 2016, a second, part-time team was announced. Scott Lagasse Jr. was the driver at Daytona, finishing in 29th place. The team skipped Atlanta but was back at Las Vegas with Josh Reaume driving. He ran 13 laps, called it a day, and finished in 38th place. At Phoenix, Dylan Lupton drove, finishing nineteenth. This team later start and park with Josh Reaume and Josh Wise driving to save their cars for the next race. On June 23, 2016, Starr joined the team to drive the remainder of the season, with sponsorship Massimo Motors, and the team did not start and park. In 2017, the No. 93 team returned as a start and park car with Jordan Anderson, Stephen Leicht, Jeff Green, and Gray Gaulding. Sieg drove this car at Homestead, to be able to secure top 33 owners' points. Sieg returned to the car in 2018 with a 21st place finish at Daytona. J. J. Yeley took over the car, blowing an engine at Atlanta, and start and parking Las Vegas. Jeff Green then became the driver starting with Phoenix, starting and parking the car.

In 2020, rookie Myatt Snider contested much of the schedule in the No. 93. In June, Reaume's Reaume Brothers Racing took over the No. 93's operations for the rest of the season. Snider posted two top-fives, six top-tens, eight DNF's and a finish of sixteenth in points for the team.

In 2021, the No. 93 was renumbered to No. 23 and eventually ran under the Our Motorsports banner.

==== Car No. 93 results ====
Year	Driver	No.	Make	1	2	3	4	5	6	7	8	9	10	11	12	13	14	15	16	17	18	19	20	21	22	23	24	25	26	27	28	29	30	31	32	33	NXSC	Pts
2016	Scott Lagasse Jr.	93	Chevy	DAY; 29	ATL; Wth																																33rd	322
2016	Josh Reaume	93	Chevy			LVS; 38						TAL; Wth	DOV; 37				IOW; 40																				33rd	322
2016	Dylan Lupton	93	Chevy				PHO; 19	CAL; 36																													33rd	322
2016	Josh Wise	93	Chevy						TEX; 40	BRI; 39	RCH; 40			CLT; 39	POC; 36	MCH; 39																					33rd	322
2016	David Starr	93	Chevy															DAY; 27	KEN; 21	NHA; 36	IND; 24	IOW; 21	GLN; DNQ	MOH; 25	BRI; 16	ROA; 24	DAR; 23	RCH; 21	CHI; 18	KEN; 33	DOV; 28	CLT; 29	KAN; 24	TEX; 24	PHO; DNQ	HOM; DNQ	33rd	322
2017	Jordan Anderson	93	Chevy	DAY	ATL; 39	LVS; 40	PHO; 40	CAL; 40	TEX; 40	BRI; 40		TAL; Wth																									44th	44
2017	Jeff Green	93	Chevy								RCH; 40			DOV; 40	POC; 40	MCH; 35	IOW; 40	DAY	KEN; 37	NHA; 38	IND; 40	IOW; 40	GLN; 38	MOH; 39	BRI; 39	ROA; 40	DAR; 39	RCH; 40	CHI; 39	KEN; 40	DOV; 40						44th	44
2017	Stephen Leicht	93	Chevy										CLT; 40																								44th	44
2017	Gray Gaulding	93	Chevy																													CLT; 39	KAN; 39	TEX; 33	PHO; 40		44th	44
2017	Ryan Sieg	93	Chevy																																	HOM; 26	44th	44
2018	Ryan Sieg	93	Chevy	DAY; 21																																	43rd	86
2018	J. J. Yeley	93	Chevy		ATL; 37	LVS; 38											IOW; 40								BRI; 40											HOM; 36	43rd	86
2018	Jeff Green	93	Chevy				PHO; 40	CAL; 39	TEX; 40	BRI; 39	RCH; 40	TAL; 13	DOV; 40	CLT; 39	POC; 40	MCH; 40		CHI; 39	DAY; 23	KEN; 40	NHA; 40		GLN; 39	MOH; 39		ROA; 40	DAR; 39	IND; 40	LVS; 39	RCH; 39	CLT; 39	DOV; 39	KAN; 34	TEX; 38	PHO; 40		43rd	86
2018	Stephen Leicht	93	Chevy																			IOW; 39															43rd	86
2019	Jeff Green	93	Chevy	DAY; 7	ATL; 36																																32nd	331
2019	Josh Bilicki	93	Chevy			LVS; 36	PHO; 26	CAL; 30	TEX; 30	BRI; 36		TAL; 33	DOV; 38	CLT; 36	POC; 34	MCH; 21	IOW; 38	CHI; DNQ		KEN; 32			GLN; 26	MOH; 17		ROA; 20		IND; 21			CLT; 26						32nd	331
2019	Brandon Brown	93	Chevy								RCH; 20																										32nd	331
2019	Scott Lagasse Jr.	93	Chevy																DAY; 31																		32nd	331
2019	Ryan Sieg	93	Chevy																		NHA; 8																32nd	331
2019	Camden Murphy	93	Chevy																			IOW; 24					DAR; 20										32nd	331
2019	J. J. Yeley	93	Chevy																						BRI; 16							DOV; 32					32nd	331
2019	C. J. McLaughlin	93	Chevy																										LVS; 31				KAN; 24	TEX; 27		HOM; 31	32nd	331
2019	Hermie Sadler	93	Chevy																											RCH; 24							32nd	331
2019	Bayley Currey	93	Chevy																																PHO; 36		32nd	331
2020	C. J. McLaughlin	93	Chevy	DAY; 27																																PHO; 37	28th	428
2020	Joey Gase	93	Chevy		LVS; 19																																28th	428
2020	Myatt Snider	93	Chevy			CAL; 11		DAR; 35			ATL; 29	HOM; 15	HOM; 7	TAL; 27		IND; 16	KEN; 15	KEN; 31	TEX; 34	KAN; 22	ROA; 32	DAY; 10	DOV; 17	DOV; 18	DAY; 19	DAR; 10	RCH; 35	RCH; 31	BRI; 35	LVS; 19	TAL; 26	CLT; 14	KAN; 21	TEX; 29			28th	428
2020	Jeff Green	93	Chevy				PHO; 15		CLT; 36	BRI; 35					POC; 31																						28th	428
2020	Josh Reaume	93	Chevy																																MAR; 39		28th	428

== Camping World Truck Series ==
=== Truck No. 27 history ===
Dennis Setzer drove this truck at Homestead in 2011 on occasion when the 93 or 38 were occupied by someone else, but he failed to qualify.

==== Truck No. 27 results ====
Year	Driver	No.	Make	1	2	3	4	5	6	7	8	9	10	11	12	13	14	15	16	17	18	19	20	21	22	23	24	25	Owners	Pts
2011	Clay Greenfield	27	Chevy	DAY	PHO	DAR	MAR	NSH	DOV	CLT	KAN	TEX	KEN	IOW	NSH	IRP	POC	MCH	BRI	ATL; DNQ										
2011	David Stremme	27	Chevy																		CHI; 34	NHA								
2011	Brent Raymer	27	Chevy																				KEN; 36							
2011	Chris Jones	27	Chevy																					LVS; 33	TAL	MAR	TEX			
2011	Dennis Setzer	27	Chevy																									HOM; DNQ		

=== Truck No. 37 history ===
Dennis Setzer drove this truck at Kentucky in 2012 on occasion when the 38 or the 93 was occupied by another driver, finishing 35th after vibration issues.

==== Truck No. 37 results ====
Year	Driver	No.	Make	1	2	3	4	5	6	7	8	9	10	11	12	13	14	15	16	17	18	19	20	21	22	Owners	Pts
2012	Jeff Green	37	Chevy	DAY	MAR	CAR	KAN	CLT	DOV	TEX	KEN	IOW	CHI; 35	POC	MCH	BRI	ATL; DNQ	IOW									
2012	Dennis Setzer	37	Chevy																KEN; 35	LVS	TAL	MAR	TEX	PHO	HOM		

=== Truck No. 38 history ===
In 2011, Mike Garvey ran this truck as a start and park entry, as Dennis Setzer drove this truck on occasion. Chris Jones and Dennis Setzer ran the truck in 2012, with the best finish of 33rd-place. B. J. McLeod and Johnny Chapman attempted races at Martinsville and Kentucky respectively, failing to qualify. In 2013, J. J. Yeley, Johnny Chapman, Chris Jones, Tony Raines, Scott Riggs and Chad Frewaldt drove the truck as a start and park, with the best finish of 29th-place both at Michigan and Phoenix.

==== Truck No. 38 results ====
Year	Driver	No.	Make	1	2	3	4	5	6	7	8	9	10	11	12	13	14	15	16	17	18	19	20	21	22	23	24	25	Owners	Pts
2009	Mike Garvey	38	Chevy	DAY	CAL	ATL	MAR	KAN	CLT	DOV	TEX	MCH	MIL	MEM	KEN	IRP	NSH	BRI	CHI	IOW	GTW	NHA	LVS	MAR	TAL	TEX	PHO	HOM; 36		
2011	Mike Garvey	38	Chevy	DAY	PHO	ATL	MAR	NSH; 36	DOV; 35	CLT; 36	KAN; 35	TEX; 34	KEN; 34	IOW	NSH; 34	IRP; 36	POC; 28	MCH; 30	BRI	ATL; 35	CHI; 31	NHA	KEN; 32	LVS; 30	TAL	MAR	TEX; 36			
2011	Dennis Setzer	38	Chevy																									HOM; 34		
2012	B. J. McLeod	38	Chevy	DAY	MAR; DNQ	CAR																								
2012	Dennis Setzer	38	Chevy				KAN; DNQ	CLT; 34	DOV; 35	TEX			CHI; 33			BRI; 35	ATL; 36	IOW; 36				MAR; DNQ								
2012	Johnny Chapman	38	Chevy								KEN; DNQ																			
2012	Chris Jones	38	Chevy									IOW; 35		POC; 34	MCH; 33				KEN; 33	LVS; 33	TAL		TEX; 36	PHO; 35	HOM; 35					
2013	J. J. Yeley	38	Chevy	DAY	MAR	CAR	KAN; 35	CLT											CHI; 34	LVS	TAL	MAR								
2013	Johnny Chapman	38	Chevy						DOV; 36	TEX; 32																				
2013	Chris Jones	38	Chevy								KEN; 34	IOW	ELD										TEX; 32		HOM; 35					
2013	Tony Raines	38	Chevy											POC; 35																
2013	Scott Riggs	38	Chevy												MCH; 29	BRI	MSP	IOW												
2013	Chad Frewaldt	38	Chevy																					PHO; 29						

=== Truck No. 39 history ===
In 2009, the No. 39 team made its debut at Milwaukee with Sieg driving.

In 2013, Sieg, Ryan Lynch, Austin Dillon, and Alex Guenette ran with the team. Lynch ran at Kentucky, Dillon at Eldora, and Guenette at Mosport. The team ran a limited schedule in 2014. The No. 39 team returned in 2015 at Atlanta, with Sieg driving, and finished eleventh.

==== Truck No. 39 results ====
Year	Driver	No.	Make	1	2	3	4	5	6	7	8	9	10	11	12	13	14	15	16	17	18	19	20	21	22	23	24	25	Owners	Pts
2009	Ryan Sieg	39	Chevy	DAY	CAL	ATL	MAR	KAN	CLT	DOV	TEX	MCH	MIL; 13	MEM	KEN; 19	IRP	NSH; 21	BRI	CHI; 17	IOW; 25	GTW; 9	NHA	LVS; 14	MAR	TAL	TEX; 15	PHO	HOM; 22		
2010	Ryan Sieg	39	Chevy	DAY; 16	ATL; 18	MAR; 24	NSH; 27	KAN; 19	DOV; 9	CLT; 32	TEX; 30	MCH; 22	IOW; 11	GTY; 31		POC; 20	NSH; 13	DAR; 11	BRI; 22	CHI; 15	KEN; 8	NHA; 20	LVS; 25	MAR; 11	TAL; 24	TEX; 16	PHO; 20	HOM; 16		
2010	Mike Garvey	39	Chevy												IRP; 35															
2011	Ryan Sieg	39	Chevy	DAY; 25	PHO; 21	DAR; 16	MAR; 33	NSH; 21	DOV; 15	CLT; 24	KAN; 31	TEX; 7	KEN; 19	IOW; 18	NSH; 24	IRP; 29	POC; 21	MCH; 17	BRI; 25	ATL; 15	CHI; 28	NHA; 22	KEN; 33	LVS; 11	TAL; 21	MAR; 23	TEX; 15	HOM; 24		
2012	Ryan Sieg	39	Chevy	DAY; 15	MAR; 32	CAR; 22	KAN; 29	CLT; 28	DOV; 29	TEX; 19	KEN; 16	IOW; 17		POC; 29	MCH; 15	BRI; 12	ATL; 17	IOW; 14	KEN; 22	LVS; 22	TAL; 11	MAR; 26	TEX; 13	PHO; 6	HOM; 14					
2012	Chris Jones	39	Chevy										CHI; 31																	
2013	Ryan Sieg	39	Chevy	DAY; 10	MAR; 8	CAR; 22	KAN; 29	CLT; 15	DOV; 17	TEX; 16		IOW; 18	ELD	POC; 30	MCH; 15	BRI; 32	MSP	IOW; 21	CHI; 21	LVS; 19	TAL; 23	MAR; 25		PHO; 17	HOM; 12					
2013	Ryan Lynch	39	Chevy								KEN; 24												TEX; 25							
2014	Ryan Sieg	39	Chevy	DAY; 11	MAR; Wth	KAN	CLT	DOV; 24	TEX	GTW	KEN	IOW	ELD	POC	MCH	BRI	MSP	CHI	NHA	LVS	TAL; 33	MAR	TEX	PHO	HOM					
2015	Ryan Sieg	39	Chevy	DAY	ATL; 11	MAR	KAN	CLT	DOV	TEX	GTW	IOW	KEN	ELD	POC	MCH	BRI	MSP	CHI	NHA	LVS	TAL	MAR	TEX	PHO	HOM				

=== Truck No. 93 history ===
The team occasionally field start and park operations to fund the No. 39 such as the No. 93 Ryan Sieg, Jason White, Kenny Habul, and Chris Jones ran the No. 93 on a part-time basis in 2013, White also running in 2014.

==== Truck No. 93 results ====
Year	Driver	No.	Make	1	2	3	4	5	6	7	8	9	10	11	12	13	14	15	16	17	18	19	20	21	22	23	24	25	Owners	Pts
2009	Shane Sieg	93	Chevy	DAY	CAL	ATL	MAR	KAN	CLT	DOV	TEX	MCH	MLW	MEM	KEN; 34	IRP	NSH; 34	BRI	CHI; 31	IOW; 35			LVS; 34	MAR	TAL	TEX; 33	PHO	HOM; 34		
2009	Mike Garvey	93	Chevy																		GTW; 34	NHA								
2010	Shane Sieg	93	Chevy	DAY; DNQ	ATL; 28	MAR; 36	NSH; 35	KAN; 34	DOV; 33																	TEX; 30	PHO; 33	HOM; 36		
2010	Mike Garvey	93	Dodge							CLT; 36																				
2010	Mike Garvey	93	Chevy								TEX; 36	MCH; 31	IOW; 36	GTY; 34		POC; 33	NSH; 33	DAR; 32	BRI; 35	CHI; 33	KEN; 34	NHA; 31	LVS; 34	MAR; 36	TAL; 12					
2010	Ryan Sieg	93	Chevy												IRP; 25															
2011	Cole Whitt	93	Chevy	DAY; 14																										
2011	Shane Sieg	93	Chevy		PHO; 22	DAR; 12	MAR; 29	NSH; 26	DOV; 19	CLT; 23	KAN; 29	TEX; 19	KEN; 25		NSH; 28	IRP; 35	POC; 29													
2011	Mike Garvey	93	Chevy											IOW; 30					BRI; 35							MAR; 36				
2011	Casey Roderick	93	Chevy															MCH; 29												
2011	Dennis Setzer	93	Chevy																	ATL; 36	CHI; 33									
2011	Josh Wise	93	Chevy																			NHA; 29								
2011	B. J. McLeod	93	Chevy																				KEN; 26	LVS; 23	TAL; 27		TEX; 21			
2011	Ross Chastain	93	Chevy																									HOM; 27		
2012	Chris Cockrum	93	Chevy	DAY; 16	MAR; 27	ROC; 29	KAN; 26																							
2012	B. J. McLeod	93	Chevy					CLT; DNQ																						
2012	Johnny Chapman	93	Chevy						DOV; 32										KEN; 32											
2012	Brent Raymer	93	Chevy							TEX; 26																				
2012	Dennis Setzer	93	Chevy								KEN; 35	IOW; 19		POC; 28	MCH; 31					LVS; 31			TEX; 35	PHO; 32						
2012	Ryan Sieg	93	Chevy										CHI; 30																	
2012	Chris Jones	93	Chevy													BRI; 33	ATL; 31	IOW; 34			TAL; 21									
2012	Tim George, Jr.	93	Chevy																			MAR; 27								
2012	Ryan Lynch	93	Chevy																						HOM; 30					
2013	Jason White	93	Chevy	DAY; 30	MAR																									
2013	Chris Jones	93	Chevy			CAR; 34	KAN; 34	CLT; 36	DOV; 34	TEX; 30		IOW; 34	ELD; Wth	POC; 31	MCH; 27	BRI; 36	MSP	IOW; 32	CHI; 36	LVS; 27	TAL; 35	MAR; 35		PHO; 32						
2013	Ryan Sieg	93	Chevy								KEN; 20												TEX; 11							
2013	Travis Kvapil	93	Chevy																						HOM; 34					
2014	Jason White	93	Chevy	DAY; 36	MAR; Wth	KAN	CLT	DOV	TEX	GTW	KEN	IOW	ELD	POC	MCH	BRI	MSP	CHI	NHA	LVS	TAL									
2014	Dustin Hapka	93	Chevy																			MAR; DNQ	TEX	PHO	HOM					

== ARCA ==
=== ARCA Menards Series ===
==== Car No. 28 history ====
In 2021, the team would field the No. 28 part-time for Kyle Sieg.

==== Car No. 28 results ====
Year	Driver	No.	Make	1	2	3	4	5	6	7	8	9	10	11	12	13	14	15	16	17	18	19	20	Owners	Pts
2021	Kyle Sieg	28	Chevy	DAY; 5	PHO; 4	TAL; 8	KAN; 8	TOL	CLT; 12	MOH; 10	POC; 6	ELK	BLN	IOW	WIN	GLN; 12	MCH; 5	ISF	MLW	DSF	BRI; 11	SLM	KAN; 7		

=== ARCA Menards Series East ===
==== Car No. 28 history ====
In 2021, the team would field the No. 28 part-time for Kyle Sieg at Dover and Bristol.

==== Car No. 28 results ====
Year	Driver	No.	Make	1	2	3	4	5	6	7	8	Owners	Pts
2021	Kyle Sieg	28	Chevy	NSM	FIF	NSV	DOV; 13	SNM	IOW	MLW	BRI; 11		

=== ARCA Menards Series West ===
==== Car No. 28 history ====
In 2021, the team would field the No. 28 part-time for Kyle Sieg at Phoenix.

==== Car No. 28 results ====
Year	Driver	No.	Make	1	2	3	4	5	6	7	8	9	Owners	Pts
2021	Kyle Sieg	28	Chevy	PHO; 4	SON	IRW	CNS	IRW	PIR	LVS	AAS	PHO		
