= Chris Jones (racing driver) =

American racing driver

- Born: May 24, 1987 (age 39); Forest, Virginia, U.S.

NASCAR FedEx Freight Truck Series career
- 77 races run over 7 years
- 2013 position: 30th
- Best finish: 30th (2013)
- First race: 2007 Kroger 200 (Martinsville)
- Last race: 2013 Ford EcoBoost 200 (Homestead)
Wins	Top tens	Poles
0	0	0
- Statistics up to date as of January 17, 2017.

Chris Jones (born May 24, 1987) is an American professional stock car racing driver.

== Racing career ==
=== Camping World Truck Series ===
Jones has made 77 starts in the Camping World Truck Series. He attempted to make his debut in 2007 for his family team LCS Motorsports, but failed to qualify and he drove three races for Bobby Dotter that year. In 2008, Jones drove for both teams once again. In 2009, he drove ten races for LCS Motorsports, two for CHS Motorsports and one for GunBroker Racing. In 2010, Jones drove only for LCS team, except one attempt that was for Ray Hackett Racing but he failed to make the field. In 2011, was the final year that he drove for his family team, and he also drove one race for RSS Racing. In 2012, Jones split between SS-Green Light Racing and RSS Racing. In 2013, he drove only for RSS team, starting and parking almost all the races.

== Personal life ==
Chris is the Tire Specialist from RSS Racing.

== Motorsports career results ==
=== NASCAR ===
(key) (Bold – Pole position awarded by qualifying time. Italics – Pole position earned by points standings or practice time. * – Most laps led.)

==== Camping World Truck Series ====
NASCAR Camping World Truck Series results
Year	Team	No.	Make	1	2	3	4	5	6	7	8	9	10	11	12	13	14	15	16	17	18	19	20	21	22	23	24	25	NCWTC	Pts	Ref
2007	LCS Motorsports	87	Chevy	DAY	CAL	ATL	MAR; DNQ	KAN	CLT	MFD	DOV	TEX	MCH	MLW	MEM	KEN	IRP	NSH	BRI	GTW	NHA	LVS	TAL						62nd	252	
2007	Green Light Racing	08	Chevy																					MAR; 21	ATL	TEX	PHO; 27	HOM; 31	62nd	252	
2008	Green Light Racing	0	Chevy	DAY	CAL	ATL	MAR	KAN	CLT	MFD	DOV	TEX	MCH; 34	MLW				NSH; 32				LVS; 31	TAL	MAR; 32	ATL	TEX	PHO	HOM	59th	231	
2008	LCS Motorsports	87	Chevy												MEM; 32	KEN	IRP		BRI; 20										59th	231	
2008	SS-Green Light Racing	07	Chevy																	GTW; 34	NHA								59th	231	
2009	LCS Motorsports	87	Chevy	DAY	CAL	ATL; 33	MAR		CLT; 20	DOV	TEX	MCH; 25	MLW	MEM; 28	KEN; 26	IRP; 28	NSH	BRI; 22	CHI	IOW; 33	GTW			MAR; 22		TEX; 27	PHO	HOM	36th	907	
2009	GunBroker Racing	22	Dodge					KAN; 33																					36th	907	
2009	CHS Motorsports	41	Dodge																			NHA; 28	LVS		TAL; 30				36th	907	
2010	LCS Motorsports	87	Chevy	DAY	ATL; DNQ	MAR	NSH		DOV; 26	CLT; DNQ	TEX; 32	MCH; 33	IOW; 33	GTY; 32	IRP; 36	POC	NSH; 29	DAR; 33	BRI; 29	CHI; 32	KEN; 33	NHA	LVS; DNQ	MAR; 28	TAL	TEX	PHO	HOM	36th	769	
2010	Ray Hackett Racing	75	Ford					KAN; DNQ																					36th	769	
2011	LCS Motorsports	87	Chevy	DAY	PHO	DAR	MAR	NSH	DOV; 32	CLT	KAN; 34	TEX	KEN	IOW	NSH	IRP	POC	MCH; 33	BRI; 34	ATL	CHI; 35	NHA; 32	KEN; 31				TEX; 35	HOM	51st	57	
2011	RSS Racing	27	Chevy																					LVS; 33	TAL	MAR			51st	57	
2012	SS-Green Light Racing	07	Toyota	DAY	MAR	CAR	KAN; 35	CLT	DOV; 31	TEX	KEN																		32nd	170	
2012	RSS Racing	38	Chevy									IOW; 35		POC; 34	MCH; 33				KEN; 33	LVS; 33			TEX; 36	PHO; 35	HOM; 35				32nd	170	
2012	RSS Racing	39	Chevy										CHI; 31																32nd	170	
2012	RSS Racing	93	Chevy													BRI; 33	ATL; 31	IOW; 34			TAL; 21	MAR							32nd	170	
2013	RSS Racing	93	Chevy	DAY	MAR	CAR; 34	KAN; 34	CLT; 36	DOV; 34	TEX; 30		IOW; 34	ELD	POC; 31	MCH; 27	BRI; 36	MSP	IOW; 32	CHI; 36	LVS; 27	TAL; 35	MAR; 35		PHO; 32					30th	177	
2013	RSS Racing	38	Chevy								KEN; 34												TEX; 32		HOM; 35				30th	177	
