= 2023 United Rentals 200 =

4th race of the 2023 NASCAR Xfinity Series

Race details
- Race 4 of 33 of the 2023 NASCAR Xfinity Series
- Date: March 11, 2023
- Official name: 19th Annual United Rentals 200
- Location: Phoenix Raceway, Avondale, Arizona
- Course: Permanent racing facility
- Course length: 1 miles (1.6 km)
- Distance: 200 laps, 200 mi (320 km)
- Scheduled distance: 200 laps, 200 mi (320 km)
- Average speed: 82.079 mph (132.093 km/h)

Pole position
Driver	Cole Custer	Stewart-Haas Racing
- Time: 27.701

Most laps led
Driver	Sammy Smith	Joe Gibbs Racing
- Laps: 92

Winner
No. 18	Sammy Smith	Joe Gibbs Racing

Television in the United States
- Network: FS1
- Announcers: Adam Alexander, Kevin Harvick, and Joey Logano

Radio in the United States
- Radio: MRN

The 2023 United Rentals 200 was the 4th stock car race of the 2023 NASCAR Xfinity Series, and the 19th iteration of the event. The race was held on Saturday, March 11, 2023, in Avondale, Arizona at Phoenix Raceway, a 1 mile (1.6 km) permanent tri-oval shaped racetrack. The race took the scheduled 200 laps to complete. Sammy Smith, driving for Joe Gibbs Racing, would score the win after holding off Ryan Truex in the closing stages of the race. This was Smith's first career NASCAR Xfinity Series win. He would dominate the race as well, leading 92 laps. To fill out the podium, Truex, driving for Joe Gibbs Racing, and Sheldon Creed, driving for Richard Childress Racing, would finish 2nd and 3rd, respectively.

With his win, Smith became the youngest driver to win at Phoenix Raceway in the Xfinity Series.

== Background ==
Phoenix Raceway is a 1-mile, low-banked tri-oval race track located in Avondale, Arizona, near Phoenix. The motorsport track opened in 1964 and currently hosts two NASCAR race weekends annually including the final championship race since 2020. Phoenix Raceway has also hosted the CART, IndyCar Series, USAC and the WeatherTech SportsCar Championship. The raceway is currently owned and operated by NASCAR.

=== Entry list ===
- (R) denotes rookie driver.
- (i) denotes driver who is ineligible for series driver points.

#	Driver	Team	Make
00	Cole Custer	Stewart-Haas Racing	Ford
1	Sam Mayer	JR Motorsports	Chevrolet
02	Kyle Weatherman	Our Motorsports	Chevrolet
2	Sheldon Creed	Richard Childress Racing	Chevrolet
4	Bayley Currey	JD Motorsports	Chevrolet
6	Brennan Poole	JD Motorsports	Chevrolet
07	Blaine Perkins (R)	SS-Green Light Racing	Chevrolet
7	Justin Allgaier	JR Motorsports	Chevrolet
08	Gray Gaulding	SS-Green Light Racing	Ford
8	Josh Berry	JR Motorsports	Chevrolet
9	Brandon Jones	JR Motorsports	Chevrolet
10	Kyle Busch (i)	Kaulig Racing	Chevrolet
11	Daniel Hemric	Kaulig Racing	Chevrolet
16	Chandler Smith (R)	Kaulig Racing	Chevrolet
18	Sammy Smith (R)	Joe Gibbs Racing	Toyota
19	Ryan Truex	Joe Gibbs Racing	Toyota
20	John Hunter Nemechek	Joe Gibbs Racing	Toyota
21	Austin Hill	Richard Childress Racing	Chevrolet
24	Connor Mosack (R)	Sam Hunt Racing	Toyota
25	Brett Moffitt	AM Racing	Ford
26	Kaz Grala	Sam Hunt Racing	Toyota
27	Jeb Burton	Jordan Anderson Racing	Chevrolet
28	Kyle Sieg	RSS Racing	Ford
31	Parker Retzlaff (R)	Jordan Anderson Racing	Chevrolet
35	Joey Gase	Emerling-Gase Motorsports	Toyota
38	Joe Graf Jr.	RSS Racing	Ford
39	Ryan Sieg	RSS Racing	Ford
43	Ryan Ellis	Alpha Prime Racing	Chevrolet
44	Jeffrey Earnhardt	Alpha Prime Racing	Chevrolet
45	Leland Honeyman	Alpha Prime Racing	Chevrolet
48	Parker Kligerman	Big Machine Racing	Chevrolet
51	Jeremy Clements	Jeremy Clements Racing	Chevrolet
53	Patrick Emerling	Emerling-Gase Motorsports	Chevrolet
66	Timmy Hill (i)	MBM Motorsports	Ford
74	Dawson Cram	CHK Racing	Chevrolet
78	Anthony Alfredo	B. J. McLeod Motorsports	Chevrolet
91	Garrett Smithley	DGM Racing	Chevrolet
92	Josh Williams	DGM Racing	Chevrolet
98	Riley Herbst	Stewart-Haas Racing	Ford
Official entry list

== Practice ==
The first and only practice session was held on Saturday, March 11, at 9:30 AM MST, and would last for 20 minutes. Cole Custer, driving for Stewart-Haas Racing, would set the fastest time in the session, with a lap of 27.947, and an average speed of 128.815 mph (207.308 km/h).

Pos.	#	Driver	Team	Make	Time	Speed
1	00	Cole Custer	Stewart-Haas Racing	Ford	27.947	128.815
2	10	Kyle Busch (i)	Kaulig Racing	Chevrolet	27.992	128.608
3	16	Chandler Smith (R)	Kaulig Racing	Chevrolet	28.003	128.558
Full practice results

== Qualifying ==
Qualifying was held on Saturday, March 11, at 10:00 AM MST. Since Phoenix Raceway is a mile oval, the qualifying system used is a single-car, single-lap system with only one round. In that round, whoever sets the fastest time will win the pole. Cole Custer, driving for Stewart-Haas Racing, would score the pole for the race, with a lap of 27.701, and an average speed of 129.959 mph (209.149 km/h).

Pos.	#	Driver	Team	Make	Time	Speed
1	00	Cole Custer	Stewart-Haas Racing	Ford	27.701	129.959
2	7	Justin Allgaier	JR Motorsports	Chevrolet	27.755	129.706
3	11	Daniel Hemric	Kaulig Racing	Chevrolet	27.845	129.287
4	20	John Hunter Nemechek	Joe Gibbs Racing	Toyota	27.858	129.227
5	2	Sheldon Creed	Richard Childress Racing	Chevrolet	27.869	129.176
6	16	Chandler Smith (R)	Kaulig Racing	Chevrolet	27.902	129.023
7	8	Josh Berry	JR Motorsports	Chevrolet	27.954	128.783
8	21	Austin Hill	Richard Childress Racing	Chevrolet	27.959	128.760
9	39	Ryan Sieg	RSS Racing	Ford	28.008	128.535
10	98	Riley Herbst	Stewart-Haas Racing	Ford	28.020	128.480
11	18	Sammy Smith (R)	Joe Gibbs Racing	Toyota	28.021	128.475
12	19	Ryan Truex	Joe Gibbs Racing	Toyota	28.097	128.128
13	26	Kaz Grala	Sam Hunt Racing	Toyota	28.129	127.982
14	1	Sam Mayer	JR Motorsports	Chevrolet	28.142	127.923
15	31	Parker Retzlaff (R)	Jordan Anderson Racing	Chevrolet	28.142	127.923
16	27	Jeb Burton	Jordan Anderson Racing	Chevrolet	28.144	127.914
17	25	Brett Moffitt	AM Racing	Ford	28.173	127.782
18	02	Kyle Weatherman	Our Motorsports	Chevrolet	28.205	127.637
19	43	Ryan Ellis	Alpha Prime Racing	Chevrolet	28.211	127.610
20	92	Josh Williams	DGM Racing	Chevrolet	28.262	127.380
21	9	Brandon Jones	JR Motorsports	Chevrolet	28.264	127.371
22	28	Kyle Sieg	RSS Racing	Ford	28.288	127.262
23	45	Leland Honeyman	Alpha Prime Racing	Chevrolet	28.407	126.729
24	38	Joe Graf Jr.	RSS Racing	Ford	28.410	126.716
25	78	Anthony Alfredo	B. J. McLeod Motorsports	Chevrolet	28.427	126.640
26	08	Gray Gaulding	SS-Green Light Racing	Ford	28.455	126.516
27	51	Jeremy Clements	Jeremy Clements Racing	Chevrolet	28.456	126.511
28	6	Brennan Poole	JD Motorsports	Chevrolet	28.529	126.187
29	74	Dawson Cram	CHK Racing	Chevrolet	28.587	125.931
30	91	Garrett Smithley	DGM Racing	Chevrolet	28.712	125.383
31	44	Jeffrey Earnhardt	Alpha Prime Racing	Chevrolet	28.738	125.270
32	4	Bayley Currey	JD Motorsports	Chevrolet	28.752	125.209
33	35	Joey Gase	Emerling-Gase Motorsports	Toyota	28.855	124.762
Qualified by owner's points
34	53	Patrick Emerling	Emerling-Gase Motorsports	Chevrolet	28.864	124.723
35	07	Blaine Perkins (R)	SS-Green Light Racing	Chevrolet	28.927	124.451
36	24	Connor Mosack (R)	Sam Hunt Racing	Toyota	29.065	123.860
37	10	Kyle Busch (i)	Kaulig Racing	Chevrolet	–	–
38	48	Parker Kligerman	Big Machine Racing	Chevrolet	–	–
Failed to qualify
39	66	Timmy Hill (i)	MBM Motorsports	Ford	28.968	124.275
Official qualifying results
Official starting lineup

== Race results ==
Stage 1 Laps: 45

Pos.	#	Driver	Team	Make	Pts
1	7	Justin Allgaier	JR Motorsports	Chevrolet	10
2	2	Sheldon Creed	Richard Childress Racing	Chevrolet	9
3	18	Sammy Smith (R)	Joe Gibbs Racing	Toyota	8
4	98	Riley Herbst	Stewart-Haas Racing	Ford	7
5	11	Daniel Hemric	Kaulig Racing	Chevrolet	6
6	00	Cole Custer	Stewart-Haas Racing	Ford	5
7	10	Kyle Busch (i)	Kaulig Racing	Chevrolet	0
8	1	Sam Mayer	JR Motorsports	Chevrolet	3
9	20	John Hunter Nemechek	Joe Gibbs Racing	Toyota	2
10	16	Chandler Smith (R)	Kaulig Racing	Chevrolet	1

Stage 2 Laps: 45

Pos.	#	Driver	Team	Make	Pts
1	7	Justin Allgaier	JR Motorsports	Chevrolet	10
2	21	Austin Hill	Richard Childress Racing	Chevrolet	9
3	11	Daniel Hemric	Kaulig Racing	Chevrolet	8
4	18	Sammy Smith (R)	Joe Gibbs Racing	Toyota	7
5	10	Kyle Busch (i)	Kaulig Racing	Chevrolet	0
6	78	Anthony Alfredo	B. J. McLeod Motorsports	Chevrolet	5
7	1	Sam Mayer	JR Motorsports	Chevrolet	4
8	98	Riley Herbst	Stewart-Haas Racing	Ford	3
9	26	Kaz Grala	Sam Hunt Racing	Toyota	2
10	2	Sheldon Creed	Richard Childress Racing	Chevrolet	1

Stage 3 Laps: 110

Fin	St	#	Driver	Team	Make	Laps	Led	Status	Pts
1	11	18	Sammy Smith (R)	Joe Gibbs Racing	Toyota	200	92	Running	55
2	12	19	Ryan Truex	Joe Gibbs Racing	Toyota	200	0	Running	35
3	5	2	Sheldon Creed	Richard Childress Racing	Chevrolet	200	0	Running	44
4	10	98	Riley Herbst	Stewart-Haas Racing	Ford	200	0	Running	43
5	6	16	Chandler Smith (R)	Kaulig Racing	Chevrolet	200	2	Running	33
6	4	20	John Hunter Nemechek	Joe Gibbs Racing	Toyota	200	19	Running	33
7	8	21	Austin Hill	Richard Childress Racing	Chevrolet	200	22	Running	39
8	7	8	Josh Berry	JR Motorsports	Chevrolet	200	0	Running	29
9	38	10	Kyle Busch (i)	Kaulig Racing	Chevrolet	200	3	Running	0
10	3	11	Daniel Hemric	Kaulig Racing	Chevrolet	200	0	Running	41
11	14	1	Sam Mayer	JR Motorsports	Chevrolet	200	4	Running	33
12	1	00	Cole Custer	Stewart-Haas Racing	Ford	200	38	Running	30
13	17	25	Brett Moffitt	AM Racing	Ford	200	0	Running	24
14	25	78	Anthony Alfredo	B. J. McLeod Motorsports	Chevrolet	200	0	Running	28
15	37	48	Parker Kligerman	Big Machine Racing	Chevrolet	200	0	Running	22
16	9	39	Ryan Sieg	RSS Racing	Ford	200	0	Running	21
17	18	02	Kyle Weatherman	Our Motorsports	Chevrolet	200	0	Running	20
18	15	31	Parker Retzlaff (R)	Jordan Anderson Racing	Chevrolet	200	0	Running	19
19	19	43	Ryan Ellis	Alpha Prime Racing	Chevrolet	200	0	Running	18
20	27	51	Jeremy Clements	Jeremy Clements Racing	Chevrolet	200	0	Running	17
21	20	92	Josh Williams	DGM Racing	Chevrolet	200	0	Running	16
22	16	27	Jeb Burton	Jordan Anderson Racing	Chevrolet	200	0	Running	15
23	21	9	Brandon Jones	JR Motorsports	Chevrolet	200	0	Running	14
24	36	24	Connor Mosack (R)	Sam Hunt Racing	Toyota	200	0	Running	13
25	22	28	Kyle Sieg	RSS Racing	Ford	200	0	Running	12
26	33	35	Joey Gase	Emerling-Gase Motorsports	Toyota	200	0	Running	11
27	23	45	Leland Honeyman	Alpha Prime Racing	Chevrolet	200	0	Running	10
28	32	4	Bayley Currey	JD Motorsports	Chevrolet	200	0	Running	9
29	28	6	Brennan Poole	JD Motorsports	Chevrolet	200	0	Running	8
30	34	53	Patrick Emerling	Emerling-Gase Motorsports	Chevrolet	200	0	Running	7
31	24	38	Joe Graf Jr.	RSS Racing	Ford	200	0	Running	6
32	30	91	Garrett Smithley	DGM Racing	Chevrolet	200	0	Running	5
33	31	44	Jeffrey Earnhardt	Alpha Prime Racing	Chevrolet	200	0	Running	4
34	13	26	Kaz Grala	Sam Hunt Racing	Toyota	199	0	Running	5
35	35	07	Blaine Perkins (R)	SS-Green Light Racing	Chevrolet	192	0	Suspension	2
36	2	7	Justin Allgaier	JR Motorsports	Chevrolet	178	20	Accident	21
37	26	08	Gray Gaulding	SS-Green Light Racing	Ford	137	0	Accident	1
38	29	74	Dawson Cram	CHK Racing	Chevrolet	99	0	Fuel Pump	1
Official race results

== Standings after the race ==
Drivers' Championship standings

	Pos	Driver	Points
	1	Austin Hill	195
1	2	John Hunter Nemechek	165 (-30)
1	3	Justin Allgaier	156 (–39)
	4	Chandler Smith	155 (–40)
	5	Riley Herbst	155 (–40)
5	6	Sammy Smith	128 (–67)
1	7	Sam Mayer	128 (–67)
1	8	Cole Custer	118 (–77)
1	9	Josh Berry	114 (–81)
4	10	Daniel Hemric	106 (–89)
5	11	Sheldon Creed	105 (–90)
2	12	Parker Kligerman	99 (–96)
Official driver's standings

- Note: Only the first 12 positions are included for the driver standings.

Previous race: 2023 Alsco Uniforms 300 (Las Vegas)	NASCAR Xfinity Series; 2023 season	Next race: 2023 RAPTOR King of Tough 250
