= Michel Disdier =

French racing driver (born 1974)

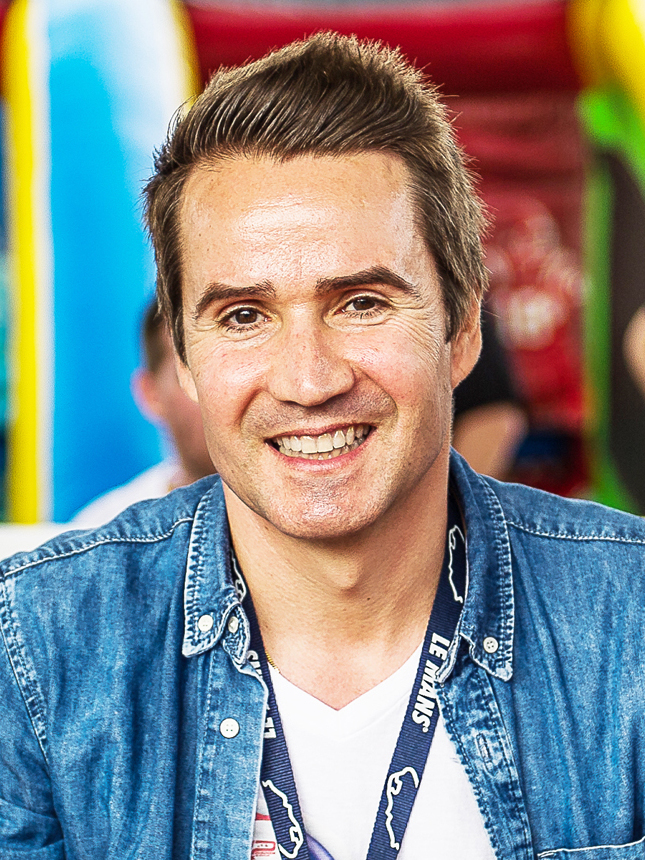
- Disdier at an autograph session at Daytona International Speedway in 2016
- Born: Michel Bernard Maurice Disdier; 10 February 1974 (age 52); Nice, France

NASCAR FedEx Freight Truck Series career
- 4 races run over 4 years
- 2025 position: 68th
- Best finish: 49th (2016)
- First race: 2014 NextEra Energy Resources 250 (Daytona)
- Last race: 2025 Baptist Health 200 (Homestead)
Wins	Top tens	Poles
0	0	0

NASCAR Canada Series career
- 1 race run over 1 year
- 2007 position: 52nd
- Best finish: 52nd (2007)
- First race: 2007 NAPA Autopro 100 (Montreal)
Wins	Top tens	Poles
0	0	0

ARCA Menards Series career
- 11 races run over 3 years
- Best finish: 28th (2009)
- First race: 2008 Kentuckiana Ford Dealers 200 (Salem)
- Last race: 2013 Lucas Oil 200 (Daytona)
Wins	Top tens	Poles
0	0	0
- Statistics up to date as of 1 November 2025.

Michel Bernard Maurice Disdier (born 10 February 1974) is a French professional racing driver. He last competed part-time in the NASCAR Craftsman Truck Series, driving the No. 67 Chevrolet Silverado RST for Freedom Racing Enterprises. He has raced motorcycles in Europe and stock cars in Canada and the United States, running in the NASCAR Canadian Tire Series.

== Racing career ==
Disdier first raced motorcycles in Europe, winning the French Moto-Cross Endurance 125cc Championship at the age of 16. In 1993, he won the Formula Ford B French title, and six years later, the Formula France Championship. After becoming an exchange student to the United States, with his host family living in North Carolina, a popular NASCAR state, Disdier became interested in stock car racing, and made his debut in the NASCAR Canadian Tire Series in 2007 in the NAPA Autopro 200 at Circuit Gilles Villeneuve for Trident Racing, finishing 29th. In 2008, Disdier joined Bowsher Motorsports to run in the ARCA Re/MAX Series, finishing 13th in his first race at Salem Speedway. The following year, Disdier was entered for ten races with Bowsher in the No. 21 Ford, running two in 2008 and the remaining eight in 2009. Disdier returned to ARCA in 2013 with Cunningham Motorsports at Daytona International Speedway, finishing 11th, a career-high.

In January 2014, Disdier was allowed by NASCAR to race on superspeedways, and tested in the Camping World Truck Series' Preseason Thunder at Daytona in the No. 07 of SS-Green Light Racing, splitting the truck with Jimmy Weller III and Todd Peck. He was later signed by the team to race in the season-opening NextEra Energy Resources 250 with SS-Green Light owner Bobby Dotter serving as spotter, making Disdier the first Frenchman to race in NASCAR since the 1970s. After starting 33rd, Disdier finished 24th, 17 laps behind race winner Kyle Busch. He returned to the team in 2016 for the Daytona race and avoided wrecks to finish 11th. He later joined Young's Motorsports in 2018 for a race at Las Vegas Motor Speedway, in which he finished 19th.

On 17 March 2025, it was revealed that Disdier would return to the now renamed NASCAR Craftsman Truck Series, driving the No. 67 Chevrolet for Freedom Racing Enterprises at Homestead–Miami Speedway.

== Motorsports career results ==
=== NASCAR ===
(key) (Bold – Pole position awarded by qualifying time. Italics – Pole position earned by points standings or practice time. * – Most laps led.)

==== Craftsman Truck Series ====
NASCAR Craftsman Truck Series results
Year	Team	No.	Make	1	2	3	4	5	6	7	8	9	10	11	12	13	14	15	16	17	18	19	20	21	22	23	24	25	NCTC	Pts	Ref
2014	SS-Green Light Racing	07	Chevy	DAY; 24	MAR	KAN	CLT	DOV	TEX	GTW	KEN	IOW	ELD	POC	MCH	BRI	MSP	CHI	NHA	LVS	TAL	MAR	TEX	PHO	HOM				77th	20	
2016	SS-Green Light Racing	07	Chevy	DAY; 11	ATL	MAR	KAN	DOV	CLT	TEX	IOW	GTW	KEN	ELD	POC	BRI	MCH	MSP	CHI	NHA	LVS	TAL	MAR	TEX	PHO	HOM			49th	22	
2018	Young's Motorsports	20	Chevy	DAY	ATL	LVS; 19	MAR	DOV	KAN	CLT	TEX	IOW	GTW	CHI	KEN	ELD	POC	MCH	BRI	MSP	LVS	TAL	MAR	TEX	PHO	HOM			71st	18	
2025	Freedom Racing Enterprises	67	Chevy	DAY	ATL	LVS	HOM; 31	MAR	BRI	CAR	TEX	KAN	NWS	CLT	NSH	MCH	POC	LRP	IRP	GLN	RCH	DAR	BRI	NHA	ROV	TAL	MAR	PHO	68th	6	

^{*} Season still in progress
^{1} Ineligible for series points

==== Canadian Tire Series ====
NASCAR Canadian Tire Series results
Year	Team	No.	Make	1	2	3	4	5	6	7	8	9	10	11	12	NCTSC	Pts	Ref
2007	Richard Durivage Jr.	46	Chevy	HAM	MSP	BAR	MPS	EDM	CGV; 29	MSP	CTR	HAM	BAR	RIS	KWA	52nd	76	

=== ARCA Racing Series ===
(key) (Bold – Pole position awarded by qualifying time. Italics – Pole position earned by points standings or practice time. * – Most laps led.)

ARCA Racing Series results
Year	Team	No.	Make	1	2	3	4	5	6	7	8	9	10	11	12	13	14	15	16	17	18	19	20	21	ARSC	Pts	Ref
2008	Bowsher Motorsports	21	Ford	DAY	SLM; 13	IOW	KAN	CAR	KEN	TOL; 19	POC	MCH	CAY	KEN	BLN	POC	NSH	ISF	DSF	CHI	SLM	NJE	TAL	TOL	77th	300	
2009	Bowsher Motorsports	21	Ford	DAY	SLM	CAR	TAL	KEN; 16	TOL; 19	POC	MCH; 18	MFD; 19	IOW	KEN; 19	BLN; 16	POC	ISF	CHI	TOL; 15	DSF	NJE	SLM	KAN	CAR; 25	28th	1355	
2013	Cunningham Motorsports	22	Dodge	DAY; 11	MOB	SLM	TAL	TOL	ELK	POC	MCH	ROA	WIN	CHI	NJE	POC	BLN	ISF	MAD	DSF	IOW	SLM	KEN	KAN	106th	175	
