= 2016 NextEra Energy Resources 250 =

Race details
- Race 1 of 23 in the 2016 NASCAR Camping World Truck Series season
- The layout of the track
- Date: February 19, 2016
- Location: Daytona International Speedway, Daytona Beach, Florida
- Course: Permanent racing facility
- Course length: 2.5 miles (4.023 km)
- Distance: 250 mi (402.336 km)
- Average speed: 129.032 mph (207.656 km/h)

Pole position
Driver	Grant Enfinger	GMS Racing
- Time: 49.792

Most laps led
Driver	Austin Theriault	Brad Keselowski Racing
- Laps: 31

Winner
No. 21	Johnny Sauter	GMS Racing

Television in the United States
- Network: FS1
- Announcers: Vince Welch, Phil Parsons and Michael Waltrip

The 2016 NextEra Energy Resources 250 was the first race in the 2016 NASCAR Camping World Truck Series season. It was held at Daytona International Speedway in Daytona Beach, Florida on February 19, 2016.

== Report ==
=== Background ===
Daytona International Speedway, the track where the race was held.

Daytona International Speedway is a race track in Daytona Beach, Florida, United States. Since opening in 1959, it has been the home of the Daytona 500, the most prestigious race in NASCAR. In addition to NASCAR, the track also hosts races of ARCA, AMA Superbike, USCC, SCCA, and Motocross. It features multiple layouts including the primary 2.5 miles (4.0 km) high speed tri-oval, a 3.56 miles (5.73 km) sports car course, a 2.95 miles (4.75 km) motorcycle course, and a .25 miles (0.40 km) karting and motorcycle flat-track. The track's 180-acre (73 ha) infield includes the 29-acre (12 ha) Lake Lloyd, which has hosted powerboat racing. The speedway is owned and operated by International Speedway Corporation.

The track was built in 1959 by NASCAR founder Bill France Sr. to host racing held at the former Daytona Beach Road Course. His banked design permitted higher speeds and gave fans a better view of the cars. Lights were installed around the track in 1998 and today, it is the third-largest single lit outdoor sports facility. The speedway has been renovated three times, with the infield renovated in 2004 and the track repaved twice — in 1978 and in 2010.

On January 22, 2013, the track unveiled artist depictions of a renovated speedway. On July 5 of that year, ground was broken for a project that would remove the backstretch seating and completely redevelop the frontstretch seating. The renovation to the speedway is being worked on by Rossetti Architects. The project, named "Daytona Rising", was completed in January 2016, and it costed US$400 million, placing emphasis on improving fan experience with five expanded and redesigned fan entrances (called "injectors") as well as wider and more comfortable seating with more restrooms and concession stands. After the renovations, the track's grandstands include 101,000 permanent seats with the ability to increase permanent seating to 125,000. The project was completed before the start of Speedweeks 2016.

=== Entry list ===
No.	Driver	Team	Make
00	Cole Custer (R)	JR Motorsports	Chevy
1	David Levine	MAKE Motorsports	Chevy
02	Tyler Young	Young's Motorsports	Chevy
2	Austin Theriault	Brad Keselowski Racing	Ford
4	Christopher Bell (R)	Kyle Busch Motorsports	Toyota
05	John Wes Townley	Athenian Motorsports	Chevy
6	Norm Benning	Norm Benning Racing	Chevy
07	Michel Disdier	SS-Green Light Racing	Chevy
8	John Hunter Nemechek	NEMCO Motorsports	Chevy
9	William Byron (R)	Kyle Busch Motorsports	Toyota
10	Jennifer Jo Cobb	Jennifer Jo Cobb Racing	Chevy
11	Ben Kennedy	Red Horse Racing	Toyota
13	Cameron Hayley	ThorSport Racing	Toyota
14	Scott Lagasse Jr. (i)	NTS Motorsports	Chevy
17	Timothy Peters	Red Horse Racing	Toyota
18	Cody Coughlin (R)	Kyle Busch Motorsports	Toyota
19	Daniel Hemric	Brad Keselowski Racing	Ford
21	Johnny Sauter	GMS Racing	Chevy
22	Austin Wayne Self (R)	AM Racing	Toyota
23	Spencer Gallagher	GMS Racing	Chevy
28	Ryan Ellis (i)	FDNY Racing	Chevy
29	Tyler Reddick	Brad Keselowski Racing	Ford
33	Grant Enfinger (R)	GMS Racing	Chevy
36	Bobby Gerhart (i)	MB Motorsports	Chevy
41	Ben Rhodes (R)	ThorSport Racing	Toyota
43	Austin Hill	Empire Racing	Ford
44	Tommy Joe Martins	Martins Motorsports	Chevy
49	Timmy Hill	Premium Motorsports	Chevy
50	Travis Kvapil	MAKE Motorsports	Chevy
51	Daniel Suárez (i)	Kyle Busch Motorsports	Toyota
58	Ryan Reed (i)	Lira Motorsports	Ford
59	Korbin Forrister	Lira Motorsports	Ford
63	Reed Sorenson (i)	MB Motorsports	Chevy
66	Jordan Anderson	Bolen Motorsports	Chevy
68	Clay Greenfield	Clay Greenfield Motorsports	Chevy
71	Carlos Contreras	Contreras Motorsports	Chevy
74	Mike Harmon (i)	Mike Harmon Racing	Chevy
78	Chris Fontaine	Glenden Enterprises	Toyota
81	Ryan Truex	Hattori Racing Enterprises	Toyota
86	Brandon Brown	Brandonbilt Motorsports	Chevy
88	Matt Crafton	ThorSport Racing	Toyota
92	Parker Kligerman	RBR Enterprises	Ford
98	Rico Abreu (R)	ThorSport Racing	Toyota

=== Practice and qualifying ===
==== First practice ====
Timothy Peters had the fastest lap at a 47.612 (189.028 mph). Ben Rhodes had the fastest 10 lap average. Scott Lagasse Jr. did not finish a timed lap during the session.

===== Top 5 =====
No.	Driver	Time (sec/mph)
17	Timothy Peters	47.612/189.028
41	Ben Rhodes	47.698/188.687
11	Ben Kennedy	47.709/188.644
33	Grant Enfinger	47.771/188.399
21	Johnny Sauter	47.775/188.383

==== Second practice ====
Spencer Gallagher had the fastest lap, a 47.838 (188.135 mph). Timothy Peters had the best 10 lap average.

===== Top 5 =====
No.	Driver	Time (sec/mph)
23	Spencer Gallagher	47.838/188.135
17	Timothy Peters	47.865/188.029
29	Tyler Reddick	47.886/187.946
98	Rico Abreu	48.445/185.778
88	Matt Crafton	48.479/185.647

==== Qualifying ====
Pos	No.	Driver	Team	Manufacturer	R1	R2
1	33	Grant Enfinger (R)	GMS Racing	Chevrolet	49.751	49.792
2	21	Johnny Sauter	GMS Racing	Chevrolet	49.910	49.976
3	17	Timothy Peters	Red Horse Racing	Toyota	50.242	50.086
4	2	Austin Theriault	Brad Keselowski Racing	Ford	50.370	50.235
5	51	Daniel Suárez (i)	Kyle Busch Motorsports	Toyota	50.412	50.249
6	88	Matt Crafton	ThorSport Racing	Toyota	50.323	50.294
7	05	John Wes Townley	Athenian Motorsports	Chevrolet	50.215	50.313
8	4	Christopher Bell (R)	Kyle Busch Motorsports	Toyota	50.326	50.382
9	18	Cody Coughlin (R)	Kyle Busch Motorsports	Toyota	50.465	50.401
10	00	Cole Custer (R)	JR Motorsports	Chevrolet	50.485	50.479
11	23	Spencer Gallagher	GMS Racing	Chevrolet	50.265	50.493
12	29	Tyler Reddick	Brad Keselowski Racing	Ford	50.642	50.787
13	9	William Byron (R)	Kyle Busch Motorsports	Toyota	50.657	
14	13	Cameron Hayley	ThorSport Racing	Toyota	50.747	
15	8	John Hunter Nemechek	NEMCO Motorsports	Chevrolet	50.804	
16	98	Rico Abreu (R)	ThorSport Racing	Toyota	50.831	
17	78	Chris Fontaine	Glenden Enterprises	Toyota	50.850	
18	19	Daniel Hemric	Brad Keselowski Racing	Ford	50.894	
19	22	Austin Wayne Self (R)	AM Racing	Toyota	50.899	
20	81	Ryan Truex	Hattori Racing Enterprises	Toyota	51.008	
21	02	Tyler Young	Young's Motorsports	Chevrolet	51.026	
22	86	Brandon Brown	Brandonbilt Motorsports	Chevrolet	51.039	
23	92	Parker Kligerman	RBR Enterprises	Ford	51.046	
24	41	Ben Rhodes (R)	ThorSport Racing	Toyota	51.050	
25	36	Bobby Gerhart (i)	Bobby Gerhart Racing	Chevrolet	51.375	
26	14	Scott Lagasse Jr. (i)	NTS Motorsports	Chevrolet	51.392	
27	66	Jordan Anderson	Bolen Motorsports	Chevrolet	51.557	
28	44	Tommy Joe Martins	Martins Motorsports	Chevrolet	51.818	
29	07	Michel Disdier	SS-Green Light Racing	Chevrolet	52.236	
30	49	Timmy Hill	Premium Motorsports	Chevrolet	52.595	
31	11	Ben Kennedy	Red Horse Racing	Toyota	N/A	
32	50	Travis Kvapil	MAKE Motorsports	Chevrolet	52.561	
33	59	Korbin Forrister	Lira Motorsports	Ford	51.605	
34	58	Ryan Reed (i)	Lira Motorsports	Ford	51.654	
35	68	Clay Greenfield	Clay Greenfield Motorsports	Chevrolet	51.705	
36	43	Austin Hill	Empire Racing	Ford	51.721	
37	6	Norm Benning	Norm Benning Racing	Chevrolet	51.745	
38	71	Carlos Contreras	Contreras Motorsports	Chevrolet	51.913	
39	63	Reed Sorenson (i)	MB Motorsports	Chevrolet	52.094	
40	10	Jennifer Jo Cobb	JJC Racing	Chevrolet	51.261	
41	28	Ryan Ellis (i)	FDNY Racing	Chevrolet	52.413	
42	1	David Levine	MAKE Motorsports	Chevrolet	53.819	
43	74	Mike Harmon (i)	Mike Harmon Racing	Chevrolet	54.405	
Official qualifying results

=== Race results ===
Pos	Grid	No.	Driver	Team	Manufacturer	Laps	Points
1	2	21	Johnny Sauter	GMS Racing	Chevrolet	100	36
2	20	81	Ryan Truex	Hattori Racing Enterprises	Toyota	100	32
3	23	92	Parker Kligerman	RBR Enterprises	Ford	100	30
4	22	86	Brandon Brown	Brandonbilt Motorsports	Chevrolet	100	29
5	32	50	Travis Kvapil	MAKE Motorsports	Chevrolet	100	29
6	21	02	Tyler Young	Young's Motorsports	Chevrolet	100	27
7	24	41	Ben Rhodes (R)	ThorSport Racing	Toyota	100	16
8	18	19	Daniel Hemric	Brad Keselowski Racing	Ford	100	25
9	26	14	Scott Lagasse Jr. (i)	NTS Motorsports	Chevrolet	100	0
10	6	88	Matt Crafton	ThorSport Racing	Toyota	100	24
11	29	07	Michel Disdier	SS-Green Light Racing	Chevrolet	100	22
12	25	36	Bobby Gerhart (i)	Bobby Gerhart Racing	Chevrolet	100	0
13	13	9	William Byron (R)	Kyle Busch Motorsports	Toyota	100	20
14	30	49	Timmy Hill	Premium Motorsports	Chevrolet	100	20
15	3	17	Timothy Peters	Red Horse Racing	Toyota	100	19
16	8	4	Christopher Bell	Kyle Busch Motorsports	Toyota	99	17
17	15	8	John Hunter Nemechek	NEMCO Motorsports	Chevrolet	99	16
18	12	29	Tyler Reddick	Brad Keselowski Racing	Ford	99	16
19	19	22	Austin Wayne Self (R)	AM Racing	Toyota	99	14
20	1	33	Grant Enfinger (R)	GMS Racing	Chevrolet	98	14
21	11	23	Spencer Gallagher	GMS Racing	Chevrolet	96	12
22	17	78	Chris Fontaine	Glenden Enterprises	Toyota	95	11
23	31	11	Ben Kennedy	Red Horse Racing	Toyota	93	10
24	10	00	Cole Custer (R)	JR Motorsports	Chevrolet	93	9
25	14	13	Cameron Hayley	ThorSport Racing	Toyota	92	9
26	7	05	John Wes Townley	Athenian Motorsports	Chevrolet	92	7
27	4	2	Austin Theriault	Brad Keselowski Racing	Ford	92	8
28	5	51	Daniel Suárez (i)	Kyle Busch Motorsports	Toyota	92	0
29	16	98	Rico Abreu (R)	ThorSport Racing	Toyota	92	4
30	27	66	Jordan Anderson	Bolen Motorsports	Chevrolet	75	3
31	9	18	Cody Coughlin (R)	Kyle Busch Motorsports	Toyota	41	2
32	28	44	Tommy Joe Martins	Martins Motorsports	Chevrolet	11	1
