= 2018 Stratosphere 200 =

Race details
- Race 3 of 23 of the 2018 NASCAR Camping World Truck Series
- Date: March 2, 2018
- Official name: Stratosphere 200
- Location: North Las Vegas, Nevada, Las Vegas Motor Speedway
- Course: Permanent racing facility
- Course length: 1.5 miles (2.41 km)
- Distance: 134 laps, 201 mi (323.478 km)
- Scheduled distance: 134 laps, 201 mi (323.478 km)
- Average speed: 122.665 miles per hour (197.410 km/h)

Pole position
Driver	Kyle Busch	Kyle Busch Motorsports
- Time: 30.575

Most laps led
Driver	Kyle Busch	Kyle Busch Motorsports
- Laps: 55

Winner
No. 51	Kyle Busch	Kyle Busch Motorsports

Television in the United States
- Network: Fox Sports 1
- Announcers: Vince Welch, Phil Parsons, Michael Waltrip

Radio in the United States
- Radio: Motor Racing Network

The 2018 Stratosphere 200 was the third stock car race of the 2018 NASCAR Camping World Truck Series season, and the 22nd iteration of the event. The race was held on Friday, March 2 in North Las Vegas, Nevada at Las Vegas Motor Speedway, a 1.5 miles (2.4 km) permanent D-shaped oval racetrack. The race took the scheduled 134 laps to complete. In a late race restart, Kyle Busch of Kyle Busch Motorsports was able to hold off a charging Sauter and Moffitt for the last 11 laps to win the race, the 50th NASCAR Camping World Truck Series win of his career and the first of the season. To fill out the rest of the podium, Johnny Sauter of GMS Racing and Brett Moffitt of Hattori Racing Enterprises finished 2nd and 3rd, respectively.

== Background ==
The layout of Las Vegas Motor Speedway, the venue where the race was held.

Las Vegas Motor Speedway, located in Clark County, Nevada outside the Las Vegas city limits and about 15 miles northeast of the Las Vegas Strip, is a 1,200-acre (490 ha) complex of multiple tracks for motorsports racing. The complex is owned by Speedway Motorsports, Inc., which is headquartered in Charlotte, North Carolina.

=== Entry list ===
#	Driver	Team	Make	Sponsor
0	Mike Senica	Jennifer Jo Cobb Racing	Chevrolet	Betty Lou's
1	Tommy Regan	TJL Motorsports	Chevrolet	Motorsports Safety Group
2	Cody Coughlin	GMS Racing	Chevrolet	Jegs
02	Austin Hill	Young's Motorsports	Chevrolet	United Rentals
3	Jordan Anderson	Jordan Anderson Racing	Chevrolet	Bommarito Automotive Group, Lucas Oil
4	Spencer Davis	Kyle Busch Motorsports	Toyota	SiriusXM, JBL
6	Norm Benning	Norm Benning Racing	Chevrolet	Zomongo
8	John Hunter Nemechek	NEMCO Motorsports	Chevrolet	NEMCO Motorsports
10	Jennifer Jo Cobb	Jennifer Jo Cobb Racing	Chevrolet	Driven2Honor.org, ThinkRealty.com
13	Myatt Snider	ThorSport Racing	Ford	Liberty Tax "You Do Life, We Do Taxes"
15	Robby Lyons	Premium Motorsports	Chevrolet	Sunwest Construction
16	Brett Moffitt	Hattori Racing Enterprises	Toyota	Aisin
18	Noah Gragson	Kyle Busch Motorsports	Toyota	Safelite Auto Glass
20	Michel Disdier	Young's Motorsports	Chevrolet	Richard Orlinski
21	Johnny Sauter	GMS Racing	Chevrolet	Allegiant Air
22	Austin Wayne Self	Niece Motorsports	Chevrolet	AM Technical Solutions, GO TEXAN. "Don't mess with Texas"
24	Justin Haley	GMS Racing	Chevrolet	Fraternal Order of Eagles
25	Dalton Sargeant	GMS Racing	Chevrolet	Performance Plus Motor Oil
33	Josh Reaume	Reaume Brothers Racing	Toyota	Gnarly Jerky
41	Ben Rhodes	ThorSport Racing	Ford	Alpha Energy Solutions
45	Justin Fontaine	Niece Motorsports	Chevrolet	Promatic Automation
49	Wendell Chavous	Premium Motorsports	Chevrolet	SobrietyNation.org/
50	B. J. McLeod	Beaver Motorsports	Chevrolet	Beaver Motorsports
51	Kyle Busch	Kyle Busch Motorsports	Toyota	Cessna, Beechcraft
52	Stewart Friesen	Halmar Friesen Racing	Chevrolet	Halmar "We Build America"
54	Justin Marks	DGR-Crosley	Toyota	Crosley Brands
63	Scott Stenzel	Copp Motorsports	Chevrolet	Copp Motorsports
74	Mike Harmon	Mike Harmon Racing	Chevrolet	Atlanta Havoc
83	Bayley Currey	Copp Motorsports	Chevrolet	Fr8Auctions, United Nissan
87	Joe Nemechek	NEMCO Motorsports	Chevrolet	NEMCO Motorsports
88	Matt Crafton	ThorSport Racing	Ford	Menards, Hormel Black Label Bacon
98	Grant Enfinger	ThorSport Racing	Ford	Curb Records
Official entry list

== Practice ==
=== First practice ===
The first practice was held on Thursday, March 1 at 5:05 p.m. EST. Justin Marks of DGR-Crosley would set the fastest time of the session with a 30.313 and an average speed of 178.141 miles per hour (286.690 km/h).

Pos.	#	Driver	Team	Make	Time	Speed
1	54	Justin Marks	DGR-Crosley	Toyota	30.313	178.141
2	16	Brett Moffitt	Hattori Racing Enterprises	Toyota	30.317	178.118
3	18	Noah Gragson	Kyle Busch Motorsports	Toyota	30.345	177.954
Full first practice results

=== Second and final practice ===
The second and final practice was held on Thursday, March 1 at 7:05 p.m. EST. Johnny Sauter of GMS Racing would set the fastest time with a 30.114 and an average speed of 179.319 miles per hour (288.586 km/h).

Pos.	#	Driver	Team	Make	Time	Speed
1	21	Johnny Sauter	GMS Racing	Chevrolet	30.114	179.319
2	16	Brett Moffitt	Hattori Racing Enterprises	Toyota	30.154	179.081
3	18	Noah Gragson	Kyle Busch Motorsports	Toyota	30.184	178.903
Full final practice results

== Qualifying ==
Qualifying was held on Friday, March 2, at 6:05 p.m. EST. The qualifying system was a single car, single lap, two round system where in the first round, everyone would set a time to determine positions 13-32. Then, the fastest 12 qualifiers would move on to the second round to determine positions 1-12.

=== Starting lineup ===
Pos.	#	Driver	Team	Make	Time (R1)	Speed (R1)	Time (R2)	Speed (R2)
1	51	Kyle Busch	Kyle Busch Motorsports	Toyota			30.575	176.615
2	52	Stewart Friesen	Halmar Friesen Racing	Chevrolet			30.597	176.488
3	21	Johnny Sauter	GMS Racing	Chevrolet			30.680	176.010
4	4	Spencer Davis	Kyle Busch Motorsports	Toyota			30.695	175.924
5	18	Noah Gragson	Kyle Busch Motorsports	Toyota			30.737	175.684
6	16	Brett Moffitt	Hattori Racing Enterprises	Toyota			30.785	175.410
7	54	Justin Marks	DGR-Crosley	Toyota			30.810	175.268
8	98	Grant Enfinger	ThorSport Racing	Ford			30.931	174.582
9	8	John Hunter Nemechek	NEMCO Motorsports	Chevrolet			31.006	174.160
10	13	Myatt Snider	ThorSport Racing	Ford			31.047	173.930
11	24	Justin Haley	GMS Racing	Chevrolet			31.053	173.896
12	88	Matt Crafton	ThorSport Racing	Ford			31.127	173.483
Eliminated in Round 1
13	02	Austin Hill	Young's Motorsports	Chevrolet	31.044	173.947	—	—
14	2	Cody Coughlin	GMS Racing	Chevrolet	31.059	173.863	—	—
15	41	Ben Rhodes	ThorSport Racing	Ford	31.092	173.678	—	—
16	3	Jordan Anderson	Jordan Anderson Racing	Chevrolet	31.145	173.383	—	—
17	45	Justin Fontaine	Niece Motorsports	Chevrolet	31.220	172.966	—	—
18	25	Dalton Sargeant	GMS Racing	Chevrolet	31.231	172.905	—	—
19	22	Austin Wayne Self	Niece Motorsports	Chevrolet	31.249	172.806	—	—
20	49	Wendell Chavous	Premium Motorsports	Chevrolet	31.329	172.364	—	—
21	87	Joe Nemechek	NEMCO Motorsports	Chevrolet	31.388	172.040	—	—
22	20	Michel Disdier	Young's Motorsports	Chevrolet	31.398	171.985	—	—
23	83	Bayley Currey	Copp Motorsports	Chevrolet	31.472	171.581	—	—
24	15	Robby Lyons	Premium Motorsports	Chevrolet	32.426	166.533	—	—
25	33	Josh Reaume	Reaume Brothers Racing	Toyota	32.791	164.679	—	—
26	74	Mike Harmon	Mike Harmon Racing	Chevrolet	32.802	164.624	—	—
27	10	Jennifer Jo Cobb	Jennifer Jo Cobb Racing	Chevrolet	33.818	159.678	—	—
Qualified by owner's points
28	1	Tommy Regan	TJL Motorsports	Chevrolet	35.383	152.616	—	—
29	63	Scott Stenzel	Copp Motorsports	Chevrolet	36.224	149.072	—	—
30	6	Norm Benning	Norm Benning Racing	Chevrolet	37.856	142.646	—	—
31	50	B. J. McLeod	Beaver Motorsports	Chevrolet	—	—	—	—
32	0	Mike Senica	Jennifer Jo Cobb Racing	Chevrolet	—	—	—	—
Official starting lineup

== Race results ==
Stage 1 Laps: 40

Pos.	#	Driver	Team	Make	Pts
1	18	Noah Gragson	Kyle Busch Motorsports	Toyota	10
2	4	Spencer Davis	Kyle Busch Motorsports	Toyota	9
3	51	Kyle Busch	Kyle Busch Motorsports	Toyota	0
4	52	Stewart Friesen	Halmar Friesen Racing	Chevrolet	7
5	13	Myatt Snider	ThorSport Racing	Ford	6
6	41	Ben Rhodes	ThorSport Racing	Ford	5
7	21	Johnny Sauter	GMS Racing	Chevrolet	4
8	16	Brett Moffitt	Hattori Racing Enterprises	Toyota	3
9	2	Cody Coughlin	GMS Racing	Chevrolet	2
10	88	Matt Crafton	ThorSport Racing	Ford	1

Stage 2 Laps: 40

Pos.	#	Driver	Team	Make	Pts
1	52	Stewart Friesen	Halmar Friesen Racing	Chevrolet	10
2	13	Myatt Snider	ThorSport Racing	Ford	9
3	51	Kyle Busch	Kyle Busch Motorsports	Toyota	0
4	41	Ben Rhodes	ThorSport Racing	Ford	7
5	16	Brett Moffitt	Hattori Racing Enterprises	Toyota	6
6	18	Noah Gragson	Kyle Busch Motorsports	Toyota	5
7	24	Justin Haley	GMS Racing	Chevrolet	4
8	21	Johnny Sauter	GMS Racing	Chevrolet	3
9	98	Grant Enfinger	ThorSport Racing	Ford	2
10	4	Spencer Davis	Kyle Busch Motorsports	Toyota	1

Stage 3 Laps: 54

Fin	St	#	Driver	Team	Make	Laps	Led	Status	Pts
1	1	51	Kyle Busch	Kyle Busch Motorsports	Toyota	134	55	running	0
2	3	21	Johnny Sauter	GMS Racing	Chevrolet	134	0	running	42
3	6	16	Brett Moffitt	Hattori Racing Enterprises	Toyota	134	27	running	43
4	8	98	Grant Enfinger	ThorSport Racing	Ford	134	4	running	35
5	2	52	Stewart Friesen	Halmar Friesen Racing	Chevrolet	134	31	running	49
6	18	25	Dalton Sargeant	GMS Racing	Chevrolet	134	3	running	31
7	15	41	Ben Rhodes	ThorSport Racing	Ford	134	0	running	42
8	14	2	Cody Coughlin	GMS Racing	Chevrolet	134	0	running	31
9	17	45	Justin Fontaine	Niece Motorsports	Chevrolet	134	2	running	28
10	13	02	Austin Hill	Young's Motorsports	Chevrolet	134	0	running	27
11	7	54	Justin Marks	DGR-Crosley	Toyota	134	0	running	26
12	5	18	Noah Gragson	Kyle Busch Motorsports	Toyota	134	12	running	40
13	4	4	Spencer Davis	Kyle Busch Motorsports	Toyota	134	0	running	34
14	20	49	Wendell Chavous	Premium Motorsports	Chevrolet	134	0	running	23
15	10	13	Myatt Snider	ThorSport Racing	Ford	133	0	running	37
16	19	22	Austin Wayne Self	Niece Motorsports	Chevrolet	133	0	running	21
17	16	3	Jordan Anderson	Jordan Anderson Racing	Chevrolet	133	0	running	20
18	24	15	Robby Lyons	Premium Motorsports	Chevrolet	133	0	running	19
19	22	20	Michel Disdier	Young's Motorsports	Chevrolet	132	0	running	18
20	23	83	Bayley Currey	Copp Motorsports	Chevrolet	132	0	running	17
21	9	8	John Hunter Nemechek	NEMCO Motorsports	Chevrolet	130	0	running	0
22	26	74	Mike Harmon	Mike Harmon Racing	Chevrolet	127	0	running	15
23	31	50	B. J. McLeod	Beaver Motorsports	Chevrolet	123	0	running	0
24	27	10	Jennifer Jo Cobb	Jennifer Jo Cobb Racing	Chevrolet	123	0	running	13
25	25	33	Josh Reaume	Reaume Brothers Racing	Toyota	119	0	engine	12
26	30	6	Norm Benning	Norm Benning Racing	Chevrolet	118	0	parked	11
27	28	1	Tommy Regan	TJL Motorsports	Chevrolet	112	0	running	10
28	11	24	Justin Haley	GMS Racing	Chevrolet	75	0	crash	13
29	12	88	Matt Crafton	ThorSport Racing	Ford	40	0	brakes	9
30	32	0	Mike Senica	Jennifer Jo Cobb Racing	Chevrolet	28	0	electrical	7
31	21	87	Joe Nemechek	NEMCO Motorsports	Chevrolet	23	0	vibration	6
32	29	63	Scott Stenzel	Copp Motorsports	Chevrolet	5	0	electrical	5
Official race results

Previous race: 2018 Active Pest Control 200	NASCAR Camping World Truck Series; 2018 season	Next race: 2018 Alpha Energy Solutions 250
