= Jimmy Weller III =

American racing driver (born 1985)

- Born: November 20, 1985 (age 40); Hubbard, Ohio, U.S.

NASCAR O'Reilly Auto Parts Series career
- 10 races run over 2 years
- 2015 position: 39th
- Best finish: 39th (2015)
- First race: 2014 ToyotaCare 250 (Richmond)
- Last race: 2015 Drive for the Cure 300 (Charlotte)
Wins	Top tens	Poles
0	0	0

NASCAR FedEx Freight Truck Series career
- 15 races run over 2 years
- 2014 position: 28th
- Best finish: 28th (2014)
- First race: 2013 American Ethanol 200 (Iowa)
- Last race: 2014 Fred's 250 (Talladega)
Wins	Top tens	Poles
0	1	0

Jimmy Weller III (born November 20, 1985) is an American former professional stock car racing driver. He has driven in various levels of racing, including the NASCAR Xfinity Series and NASCAR Camping World Truck Series.

== Racing career ==
=== Early years ===
Weller started his racing career in big-block modifieds near his family's steel business in Ohio. He returned to big-blocks in 2016 at Sharon Speedway and Lernerville Speedway after sponsorship issues in the NASCAR Xfinity Series.

Weller was critically injured in a 2004 sprint car accident at the Charlotte Motor Speedway dirt track. He was in the ICU for three weeks, two of them in a coma. His family credits the quick work of a local paramedic to save Weller's life after he flipped and got tangled in the catchfence.

=== K&N Pro Series East ===
Weller broke into the series in 2011, driving for family friend and NASCAR driver Dave Blaney. He finished 14th in his only race that year. In 2012, Weller ran the entire season with a family team. He scored two top-ten finishes, including an eighth at Dover International Speedway. He ran a limited schedule in 2013 while also running some NASCAR Camping World Truck Series races. He recorded a best finish of eighth at Bristol Motor Speedway.

=== Camping World Truck Series ===
Weller debuted in the Camping World Truck Series in 2013 with SS-Green Light Racing, driving the No. 81 truck to a 24th-place finish at Iowa Speedway. He failed to qualify in SS-Green Light's No. 07 truck the next race at Eldora Speedway, and continued to struggle in occasional runs in the 07 until he returned to the 81 truck for the season finale, posting a career-best finish of 17th. Sticking with SS-Green Light in 2014, Weller made ten starts. He failed to finish half (two crashes, three mechanical problems), but recorded his first top-ten in the season's opening race. He also cracked the top-fifteen later in the year at Charlotte Motor Speedway.

=== Xfinity Series ===
At the same time running a limited Truck slate, Weller attempted his first two NASCAR Xfinity Series races in 2014, starting and parking in one and failing to qualify for the other with SS-Green Light Racing. Splitting time between SS-Green Light (five races) and Rick Ware Racing (four races) in 2015, Weller failed to finish three of his starts and finished in the top-30 in five races. He performed well at Chicagoland, recording a career-best finish of 26th.

== Motorsports career results ==
=== NASCAR ===
(key) (Bold – Pole position awarded by qualifying time. Italics – Pole position earned by points standings or practice time. * – Most laps led.)

==== Xfinity Series ====
NASCAR Xfinity Series results
Year	Team	No.	Make	1	2	3	4	5	6	7	8	9	10	11	12	13	14	15	16	17	18	19	20	21	22	23	24	25	26	27	28	29	30	31	32	33	NXSC	Pts	Ref
2014	SS-Green Light Racing	55	Chevy	DAY	PHO	LVS	BRI	CAL	TEX	DAR	RCH; 40	TAL	IOW	CLT	DOV	MCH	ROA	KEN	DAY	NHA	CHI	IND	IOW	GLN	MOH	BRI	ATL	RCH	CHI	KEN	DOV	KAN					118th	0^{1}	
2014	SS-Green Light Racing	77	Chevy																														CLT; DNQ	TEX	PHO	HOM	118th	0^{1}	
2015	SS-Green Light Racing	90	Chevy	DAY	ATL; 33	LVS	PHO	CAL	TEX	BRI	RCH; 33	TAL	IOW	CLT; 26	DOV																	CLT; 30	KAN	TEX	PHO	HOM	39th	117	
2015	Rick Ware Racing	15	Chevy													MCH; 30	CHI; 29	DAY	KEN	NHA	IND																39th	117	
2015	Rick Ware Racing	90	Chevy																			IOW; 33	GLN	MOH	BRI	ROA	DAR	RCH; 39									39th	117	
2015	SS-Green Light Racing	15	Chevy																										CHI; 26	KEN	DOV						39th	117	

==== Camping World Truck Series ====
NASCAR Camping World Truck Series results
Year	Team	No.	Make	1	2	3	4	5	6	7	8	9	10	11	12	13	14	15	16	17	18	19	20	21	22	NCWTC	Pts	Ref
2013	SS-Green Light Racing	81	Toyota	DAY	MAR	CAR	KAN	CLT	DOV	TEX	KEN	IOW; 24													HOM; 17	39th	82	
2013	SS-Green Light Racing	07	Chevy										ELD; DNQ	POC	MCH	BRI	MSP									39th	82	
2013	SS-Green Light Racing	07	Toyota															IOW; 35	CHI; 25	LVS	TAL	MAR; 36	TEX	PHO		39th	82	
2014	SS-Green Light Racing	08	Chevy	DAY; 9	MAR		CLT; 14	DOV; 30	TEX; 17	GTW	KEN; 22	IOW	ELD	POC	MCH; 24	BRI; 19	MSP	CHI	NHA	LVS; 26	TAL; 30	MAR	TEX	PHO	HOM	28th	225	
2014	SS-Green Light Racing	07	Chevy			KAN; 25																				28th	225	

==== K&N Pro Series East ====
NASCAR K&N Pro Series East results
Year	Team	No.	Make	1	2	3	4	5	6	7	8	9	10	11	12	13	14	NKNPSEC	Pts	Ref
2011	Dave Blaney	10	Toyota	GRE	SBO	RCH	IOW	BGS	JFC	LGY	NHA; 14	COL	GRE	NHA	DOV; DNQ			46th	191	
2012	Jim Weller Jr.	31	Toyota	BRI; 13	GRE; 22	RCH; 12	IOW; 21	BGS; 13	JFC; 16	LGY; 12	CNB; 19	COL; 8	IOW; 14	NHA; 11	DOV; 8	GRE; 21	CAR; 14	12th	412	
2013	Jim Weller Jr.	31	Toyota	BRI; 8	GRE; 21		RCH; 17	BGS										25th	130	
2013	Jim Weller Jr.	31	Chevy			FIF; 19			IOW; 25	LGY	COL	IOW	VIR	GRE	NHA	DOV	RAL	25th	130	

^{*} Season still in progress
^{1} Ineligible for series points
