= SS-Green Light Racing =

American stock car racing team

- Owner(s): Bobby Dotter; Randy Knighton; Beth Knighton
- Base: Mooresville, North Carolina
- Series: NASCAR O'Reilly Auto Parts Series
- Race drivers: 0. Garrett Smithley, Alex Labbé; 07. Josh Bilicki
- Manufacturer: Chevrolet
- Opened: 2000

Career
- Debut: O'Reilly Auto Parts Series: 2014 VFW Sport Clips Help a Hero 200 (Darlington); Camping World Truck Series: 2000 Sears DieHard 200 (Milwaukee); ARCA Menards Series: 2024 Hard Rock Bet 200 (Daytona)
- Latest race: O'Reilly Auto Parts Series: 2026 O'Reilly Auto Parts 300 (Homestead); Camping World Truck Series: 2016 Ford EcoBoost 200 (Homestead); ARCA Menards Series: 2024 Hard Rock Bet 200 (Daytona)
- Races competed: Total: 770; O'Reilly Auto Parts Series: 387; Camping World Truck Series: 382; ARCA Menards Series: 1
- Drivers' Championships: Total: 0 O'Reilly Auto Parts Series: 0 Camping World Truck Series: 0 ARCA Menards Series: 0
- Race victories: Total: 1 O'Reilly Auto Parts Series: 1 Camping World Truck Series: 0 ARCA Menards Series: 0
- Pole positions: Total: 1 O'Reilly Auto Parts Series: 0 Camping World Truck Series: 1 ARCA Menards Series: 0

SS-Green Light Racing is an American professional stock car racing team that competes in the NASCAR O'Reilly Auto Parts Series, fielding the No. 0 Chevrolet Camaro SS primarily for Garrett Smithley and the No. 07 Chevrolet Camaro SS for Bilicki. The team has a technical alliance with Richard Childress Racing.

The team is owned by former driver Bobby Dotter, who also drove for the team in numerous races when he was still driving. Dotter is currently the team's sole owner, although at various points in the team's history, businessman Ken Smith (who left the team in July 2017) and Steve Urvan (in 2010 only) as well as Texas politician Gene Christensen (who unsuccessfully ran in the Republican primary for Texas's 4th congressional district in 2008) were co-owners of the team with Dotter.

Green Light began competing in the Truck Series in 2000 and merged with SS Racing in 2008 during the economic downturn, as teams merging was a common thing at the time, resulting in financial success and stability. SS Racing was a team that was competing in the ASA and had previously partnered with Green Light's Truck team on various occasions, but fully merged with GLR beginning that year. The team competed in the Truck Series each year until 2017 when they decided to focus on their Xfinity program.

== O'Reilly Auto Parts Series ==
=== Car No. 0 history ===
Garrett Smithley in the No. 0 car at Las Vegas in 2026

On December 10, 2025, the team announced that it would be fielding the No. 0 car primarily for Garrett Smithley. Alex Labbé would drive the No. 0 at four road course events. Cole Custer would drive the No. 0 at five events starting at Las Vegas. Myatt Snider would drive the No. 0 at Gateway.

==== Car No. 0 results ====
Year	Driver	No.	Make	1	2	3	4	5	6	7	8	9	10	11	12	13	14	15	16	17	18	19	20	21	22	23	24	25	26	27	28	29	30	31	32	33	NOAPSC	Pts
2026	Garrett Smithley	0	Chevy	DAY; DNQ	ATL; 14		PHO; 29		DAR; 27	MAR; 27	ROC; 29	BRI; 38		TAL; 20	TEX; 31		DOV; 31		NSH; 33					ATL; 6	IND; 25	IOW; 29	DAY; 12	DAR; 25		BRI; 33	LVS; 25	CLT; 29	PHO; 31	TAL; 27	MAR; 35	HOM; 37	26th	445
2026	Alex Labbé	0	Chevy			COA; 13										GLN; 19					COR; 27	SON; 19															26th	445
2026	Cole Custer	0	Chevy					LVS; 18					KAN; 7					CLT; 8		POC; 12			CHI; 9														26th	445
2026	Myatt Snider	0	Chevy																										GTW; 25								26th	445

=== Car No. 07 history ===
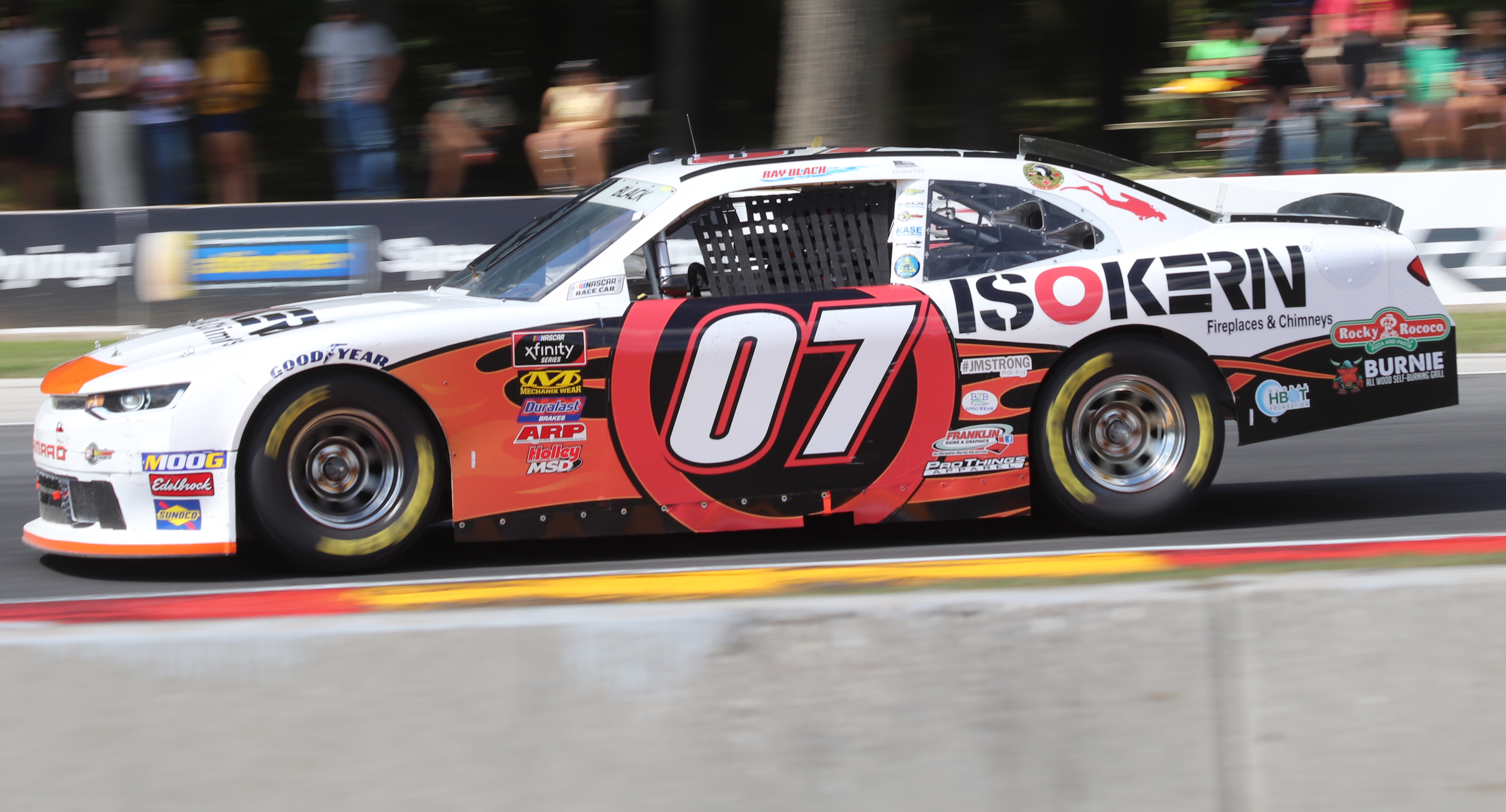
Black Jr. in the car in 2019

In 2016, the team announced that they would field the No. 07 full-time for Ray Black Jr. with sponsorship from ScubaLife.com in all the races. He picked up nine top-twenty finishes, with a best finish of fourteenth at Bristol in August. He finished nineteenth in the driver standings. Black returned to the No. 07 for 2017 but was replaced by Todd Bodine for Charlotte. It was later announced that Spencer Boyd and Andy Lally would drive at Pocono and Mid-Ohio respectively.

In 2019, Black Jr. returned to the team from a part-time ride with B. J. McLeod Motorsports to replace Boyd and would compete full-time again in the No. 07. He was announced to return to the team for the 2020 season as well.

On May 23, 2020, Black Jr. announced that he would no longer be driving the No. 07 in order to concentrate on helping his family business, the CDA Technical Institute, recover after it experienced financial problems due to the COVID-19 pandemic. After Black's departure, it was announced that Rick Ware Racing had cut a deal with SS-Green Light to field some of their drivers in the No. 07 for the remainder of the season. This began with Garrett Smithley in the car for Charlotte and Carson Ware, Rick's son, making his series debut at Bristol. The team's highlight of the year was when Gray Gaulding wheeled the 07 car to a 2nd-place finish at Daytona International Speedway when the top 4 wrecked on the final corner. Garrett Smithley scored a top 10 at Talladega, and Jade Buford scored a top-10 at Charlotte.

In 2021, Joe Graf Jr. ran most of the races in the No. 07 with Ross Chastain, J. J. Yeley and Josh Bilicki making appearances in the No. 07 throughout the season. Graf scored a top-ten finish in the Sparks 300.

SS Green-Light Racing switched from running Chevrolets to Fords in 2022, with Graf as the primary driver in the No. 07 once again.

On February 26, 2022, Cup Series driver Cole Custer claimed the team's first victory, which came at Auto Club Speedway. The entry was a collaborative effort between the team and Stewart–Haas Racing. On October 4, Truck Series driver Hailie Deegan announced she would make her Xfinity Series debut in the No. 07 at Las Vegas. Chase Briscoe and Brett Moffitt also each make a start, with Briscoe scoring a top ten at Indianapolis and Moffitt scoring a top-ten at Kansas.

For 2023, SS Green-Light Racing switched back to Chevrolet from Ford and revealed Blaine Perkins would drive the No. 07 full-time. However, he would only run the first five races of the season, and other drivers would drive the car throughout the rest of the year, with Carson Hocevar, Stefan Parsons, Dawson Cram, David Starr, Daniel Suárez, Spencer Pumpelly, Mason Maggio, Katherine Legge, Colin Garrett, Josh Bilicki, J. J. Yeley, Gray Gaulding, Natalie Decker, and Devin Jones making starts in the car.

In 2024, the No. 07 would continue to see a rotation of drivers, with Patrick Emerling running more than half of the season in the car, scoring a best finish of seventeenth. Daniil Kvyat, Myatt Snider, Logan Bearden, Alex Labbé, Greg Van Alst, C. J. McLaughlin, Jade Buford, Sage Karam, and Brad Perez all drove the No. 07 during the season, with McLaughlin tying Emerling's best of seventeenth.

In 2025, Emerling, Nick Leitz, and Labbé split the No. 07 for most of the season. Other drivers such as Carson Ware, Logan Bearden, Preston Pardus, and Brad Perez also made some starts in the No. 07 car.

on November 29, 2025, it was revealed that Josh Bilicki would run the No. 07 Chevrolet full-time in 2026.

==== Car No. 07 results ====
Year	Driver	No.	Make	1	2	3	4	5	6	7	8	9	10	11	12	13	14	15	16	17	18	19	20	21	22	23	24	25	26	27	28	29	30	31	32	33	NXSC	Pts
2016	Ray Black Jr.	07	Chevy	DAY; 33	ATL; 33	LVS; 25	PHO; 25	CAL; 37	TEX; 22	BRI; 20	RCH; 24	TAL; 29	DOV; 17	CLT; 37	POC; 21	MCH; 23	IOW; 30	DAY; 39	KEN; 19	NHA; 21	IND; 33	IOW; 20	GLN; 20	MOH; 30	BRI; 14	ROA; 15	DAR; 21	RCH; 25	CHI; 28	KEN; 20	DOV; 24	CLT; 28	KAN; 19	TEX; 27	PHO; 36	HOM; 28	24th	515
2017	Ray Black Jr.	07	Chevy	DAY; 18	ATL; 29	LVS; 31	PHO; 29	CAL; 27	TEX; 25	BRI; 37	RCH; 18	TAL; 40		DOV; 24			IOW; 29	DAY; 12	KEN; 27		IND; 24	IOW; 30			BRI; 21		DAR; 25				DOV; 21	CLT; 21			PHO; 24	HOM; 25	28th	368
2017	Todd Bodine	07	Chevy										CLT; 30																								28th	368
2017	Spencer Boyd	07	Chevy												POC; 33					NHA; 27								RCH; 31	CHI; 28				KAN; 33	TEX; 29			28th	368
2017	Korbin Forrister	07	Chevy													MCH; 31														KEN; 33							28th	368
2017	Devin Jones	07	Chevy																				GLN; 26														28th	368
2017	Andy Lally	07	Chevy																					MOH; 5													28th	368
2017	Ryan Ellis	07	Chevy																							ROA; 21											28th	368
2019	Ray Black Jr.	07	Chevy	DAY; 30	ATL; 23	LVS; 11	PHO; 18	CAL; 17	TEX; 35	BRI; 16	RCH; 21	TAL; 34	DOV; 24	CLT; 16	POC; 18	MCH; 30	IOW; 16	CHI; 20	DAY; 13	KEN; 35	NHA; 18	IOW; 11	GLN; 22	MOH; 19	BRI; 15	ROA; 14	DAR; 16	IND; 20	LVS; 19	RCH; 18	CLT; 32	DOV; 17	KAN; 14	TEX; 12	PHO; 14	HOM; 38	18th	547
2020	Ray Black Jr.	07	Chevy	DAY; 8	LVS; 17	CAL; 22	PHO; 25	DAR; 21																													18th	574
2020	Garrett Smithley	07	Chevy						CLT; 31		ATL; 24						KEN; 31	KEN; 16													TAL; 8						18th	574
2020	Carson Ware	07	Chevy							BRI; 22			HOM; 28		POC; 20																						18th	574
2020	J. J. Yeley	07	Chevy									HOM; 11																									18th	574
2020	Gray Gaulding	07	Chevy											TAL; 8											DAY; 2				BRI; 18	LVS; 24					MAR; 35		18th	574
2020	Jade Buford	07	Chevy													IND; 14						DAY; 16										CLT; 8					18th	574
2020	David Starr	07	Chevy																TEX; 13	KAN; 24			DOV; 27	DOV; 20		DAR; 34							KAN; 24	TEX; 35		PHO; 16	18th	574
2020	R.C. Enerson	07	Chevy																		ROA; 20																18th	574
2020	Joey Gase	07	Chevy																								RCH; 20	RCH; 23									18th	574
2021	Joe Graf Jr.	07	Chevy	DAY; 11	DAY; 20	HOM; 27	LVS; 18	PHO; 25	ATL; 29	MAR; 38	TAL; 33	DAR; 37	DOV; 29		CLT; DNQ	MOH; 30	TEX; 31		POC; 32		ATL; 25	NHA; 24	GLN; 30		MCH; 38	DAY; 35	DAR; 19	RCH; 31	BRI; 17	LVS; 40	TAL; 10		TEX; 26	KAN; 28	MAR; 15		34th	332
2021	Ross Chastain	07	Chevy											COA; 30																							34th	332
2021	J. J. Yeley	07	Chevy															NSH; 22																		PHO; 22	34th	332
2021	Josh Bilicki	07	Chevy																	ROA; 29				IND; 25								CLT; 38					34th	332
2022	Joe Graf Jr.	07	Ford	DAY; 29		LVS; 38	PHO; 27	ATL; 23		RCH; 29	MAR; 26	TAL; 8	DOV; 28	DAR; 36	TEX; 23	CLT; 34	PIR; 21	NSH; 37		ATL; 30	NHA; 12			MCH; 23		DAY; 37	DAR; 33		BRI; 23	TEX; 18	TAL; 22	CLT; 27		HOM; 24	MAR; 27	PHO; 36	24th	521
2022	Cole Custer	07	Ford		CAL; 1*				COA; 3										ROA; 25			POC; 10			GLN; 11												24th	521
2022	Chase Briscoe	07	Ford																				IND; 5														24th	521
2022	Brett Moffitt	07	Ford																									KAN; 10									24th	521
2022	Hailie Deegan	07	Ford																														LVS; 13				24th	521
2023	Blaine Perkins	07	Chevy	DAY; 37	CAL; 31	LVS; 35	PHO; 35	ATL; 22																													36th	224
2023	Carson Hocevar	07	Chevy						COA; 38																												36th	224
2023	Stefan Parsons	07	Chevy							RCH; 32			DOV; 28	DAR; 22	CLT; 26	PIR; 37		NSH; 38			NHA; 36	POC; DNQ		MCH; 31				DAR; 19		BRI; 19							36th	224
2023	Dawson Cram	07	Chevy								MAR; 36																		KAN; 21							PHO; 19	36th	224
2023	David Starr	07	Chevy									TAL; DNQ																			TEX; 22						36th	224
2023	Daniel Suárez	07	Chevy														SON; 27																				36th	224
2023	Spencer Pumpelly	07	Chevy																CSC; 28																		36th	224
2023	Mason Maggio	07	Chevy																	ATL; 30																	36th	224
2023	Katherine Legge	07	Chevy																				ROA; 38														36th	224
2023	Colin Garrett	07	Chevy																						IND; DNQ												36th	224
2023	Josh Bilicki	07	Ford																							GLN; 25						ROV; 25					36th	224
2023	J. J. Yeley	07	Chevy																								DAY; 30										36th	224
2023	Gray Gaulding	07	Chevy																														LVS; DNQ				36th	224
2023	Natalie Decker	07	Chevy																															HOM; DNQ			36th	224
2023	Devin Jones	07	Chevy																																MAR; 37		36th	224
2024	Patrick Emerling	07	Chevy	DAY; 17	ATL; 33	LVS; 28	PHO; 38		RCH; 36		TEX; 33	TAL; 32	DOV; 28	DAR; 33	CLT; 30			IOW; 23	NHA; 34	NSH; 38		POC; 32		MCH; 22	DAY; 18					KAN; 30					MAR; 23	PHO; 28	34th	330
2024	Daniil Kvyat	07	Chevy					COA; 21																													34th	330
2024	Myatt Snider	07	Chevy							MAR; 19																							LVS; 23				34th	330
2024	Logan Bearden	07	Chevy													PIR; 29																					34th	330
2024	Alex Labbé	07	Chevy														SON; 20				CSC; 29																34th	330
2024	Greg Van Alst	07	Chevy																				IND; 32			DAR; 29			BRI; 29								34th	330
2024	C. J. McLaughlin	07	Chevy																								ATL; 34				TAL; 17						34th	330
2024	Jade Buford	07	Chevy																									GLN; DNQ									34th	330
2024	Sage Karam	07	Chevy																													ROV; 29					34th	330
2024	Brad Perez	07	Chevy																															HOM; 28			34th	330
2025	Patrick Emerling	07	Chevy	DAY; 10				LVS; 28	HOM; 33				CAR; 19	TAL; 12					POC; 30						IOW; 30		DAY; 13									PHO; 35	32nd	356
2025	Nick Leitz	07	Chevy		ATL; 22		PHO; 30				DAR; 27				TEX; 29	CLT; 27	NSH; 27			ATL; 24			DOV; 33						GTW; 29		KAN; 38		LVS; 34	TAL; 11			32nd	356
2025	Alex Labbé	07	Chevy			COA; 14						BRI; 35						MXC; 15			CSC; 12	SON; 37						PIR; 36				ROV; 30					32nd	356
2025	Carson Ware	07	Chevy							MAR; 30																				BRI; 33							32nd	356
2025	Logan Bearden	07	Chevy																					IND; 38													32nd	356
2025	Preston Pardus	07	Chevy																							GLN; 34											32nd	356
2025	Brad Perez	07	Chevy																																MAR; 31		32nd	356
2026	Josh Bilicki	07	Chevy	DAY; 17	ATL; 15	COA; 36	PHO; 30	LVS; 23	DAR; 20	MAR; 35	ROC; 36	BRI; 23	KAN; 26	TAL; 14	TEX; 27	GLN; 25	DOV; 27	CLT; 25	NSH; 32	POC; 22	COR; 16	SON; 16	CHI; 36	ATL; 12	IND; 33	IOW; 31	DAY; 28	DAR; 24	GTW; 26	BRI; 31	LVS; 30	CLT; 18	PHO; 36	TAL; 16	MAR; 24	HOM; 30	30th	386

=== Car No. 08 history ===
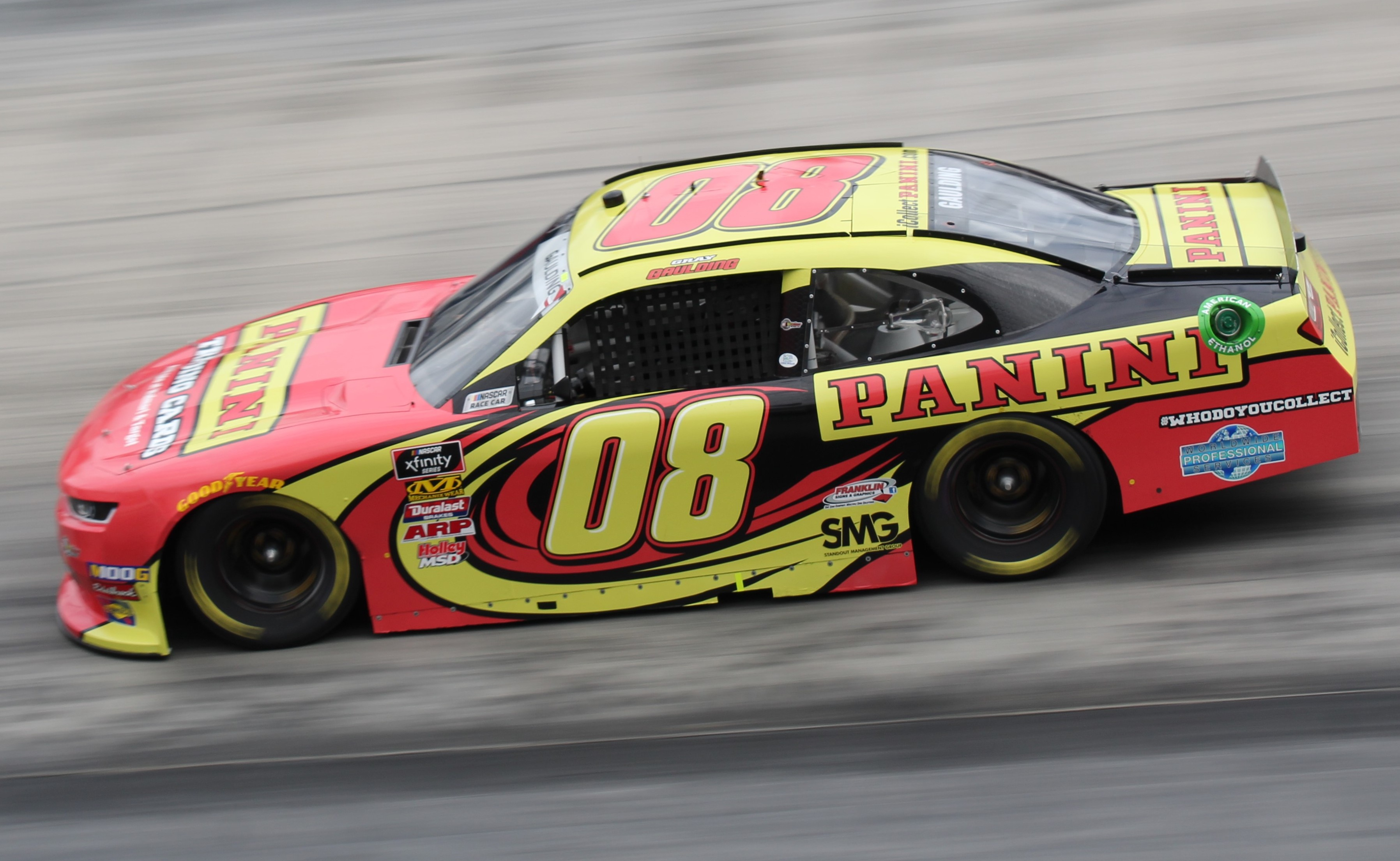
The No. 08 in 2019

In 2018, it was announced that Gray Gaulding would drive the No. 08 full-time in 2019. In April's MoneyLion 300 at Talladega Superspeedway, Gaulding finished a career-best second.

On January 16, 2020, it was announced that Joe Graf Jr. would drive the No. 08 car for the 2020 season, replacing Gaulding. He moved up from the ARCA Menards Series, where he drove the No. 77 for Chad Bryant Racing full-time for two years. Graf started out the season with Core Development Group sponsorship but signed a multi-year deal with Bucked Up Energy before Homestead-Miami. He posted a best finish of thirteenth in three races, and wound up 22nd in points.

The No. 08 returned in 2022, with the team signing David Starr for 28 races. Graf would also drive the No. 08 in select races, beginning in the Production Alliance Group 300. On March 29, DGM Racing sold the No. 92's owners points to the SS-Green Light Racing's No. 08 so it would be more likely to qualify.

The No. 08 returned again in 2023, with a rotating cast of drivers running the entry. Gaulding scored the best finish for the car, finishing eighth at Talladega. Other drivers who drove the No. 08 included Aric Almirola, Joey Gase, and Alex Labbé.

==== Car No. 08 results ====
Year	Driver	No.	Make	1	2	3	4	5	6	7	8	9	10	11	12	13	14	15	16	17	18	19	20	21	22	23	24	25	26	27	28	29	30	31	32	33	NXSC	Pts
2019	Gray Gaulding	08	Chevy	DAY; 34	ATL; 16	LVS; 12	PHO; 16	CAL; 16	TEX; 21	BRI; 15	RCH; 17	TAL; 2	DOV; 20	CLT; 14	POC; 20	MCH; 16	IOW; 14	CHI; 14	DAY; 8	KEN; 15	NHA; 17	IOW; 14	GLN; 15	MOH; 14	BRI; 6	ROA; 29	DAR; 15	IND; 13	LVS; 7	RCH; 22	CLT; 29	DOV; 18	KAN; 17	TEX; 13	PHO; 12	HOM; 17	15th	713
2020	Joe Graf Jr.	08	Chevy	DAY; 36	LVS; 20	CAL; 31	PHO; 31	DAR; 19	CLT; 19	BRI; 13	ATL; 26	HOM; 16	HOM; 13	TAL; 34	POC; 35	IND; 26	KEN; 13	KEN; 22	TEX; 21	KAN; 28	ROA; 25	DAY; 26	DOV; 18	DOV; 21	DAY; 37	DAR; 23	RCH; 19	RCH; 27	BRI; 27	LVS; 27	TAL; 31	CLT; 15	KAN; 32	TEX; 22	MAR; 21	PHO; 27	29th	422
2022	David Starr	08	Ford	DAY; DNQ		LVS; DNQ	PHO; 31	ATL; DNQ		RCH; 23	MAR; 23	TAL; 33	DOV; 35	DAR; 27	TEX; 21	CLT; DNQ				ATL; 22	NHA; 11	POC; 27		MCH; 35		DAY; 31	DAR; 25	KAN; 23	BRI; 30	TEX; 37	TAL; 25		LVS; 31	HOM; 21			31st	386
2022	Joe Graf Jr.	08	Ford		CAL; DNQ				COA; 34																												31st	386
2022	Spencer Pumpelly	08	Ford														PIR; 29																				31st	386
2022	B. J. McLeod	08	Ford															NSH; 28																			31st	386
2022	Andy Lally	08	Ford																ROA; 14				IND; 26		GLN; 19							CLT; 31					31st	386
2022	Brandon Brown	08	Ford																																MAR; 19	PHO; 37	31st	386
2023	Gray Gaulding	08	Chevy	DAY; 20				ATL; 20				TAL; 8															DAY; 9										31st	353
2023	Gray Gaulding	08	Ford		CAL; 38	LVS; 32	PHO; 37			RCH; 35	MAR; 23		DOV; 27	DAR; 29																							31st	353
2023	Aric Almirola	08	Ford						COA; 24																												31st	353
2023	Natalie Decker	08	Chevy												CLT; 34																						31st	353
2023	Preston Pardus	08	Ford													PIR; 31																					31st	353
2023	Kyle Weatherman	08	Ford														SON; 22																				31st	353
2023	Mason Massey	08	Ford															NSH; 32			NHA; 10								KAN; 16					HOM; 27			31st	353
2023	Mason Massey	08	Chevy																	ATL; 24																	31st	353
2023	Joey Gase	08	Ford																CSC; DNQ																		31st	353
2023	Alex Labbé	08	Ford																			POC; 28	ROA; 33														31st	353
2023	Alex Labbé	08	Chevy																							GLN; 24											31st	353
2023	Mason Maggio	08	Ford																					MCH; 37													31st	353
2023	Camden Murphy	08	Ford																						IRC; DNQ												31st	353
2023	Chad Finchum	08	Ford																									DAR; 22		BRI; 29					MAR; 27		31st	353
2023	J. J. Yeley	08	Ford																												TEX; 28					PHO; 36	31st	353
2023	Stefan Parsons	08	Chevy																													ROV; 18	LVS; 26				31st	353

=== Car No. 14 history ===
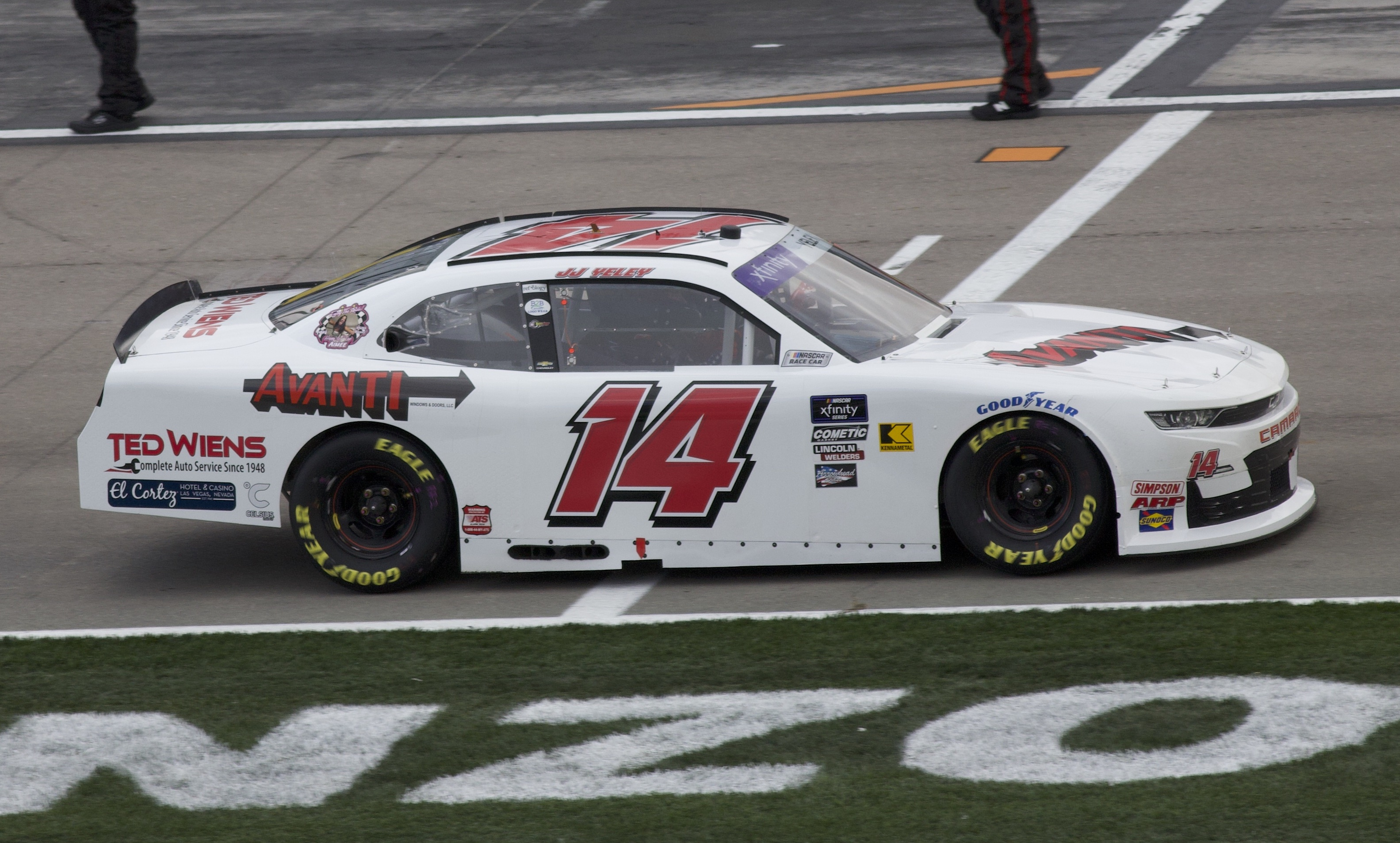
Yeley's No. 14 car at Las Vegas Motor Speedway in 2024

In 2024, SS-Green Light collaborated with Kaulig Racing to jointly field the No. 14 car. Daniel Suárez drove the car at Daytona with Wendy's as the sponsor. On February 27, 2024, crew chief Jason Miller was suspended for two races following a physical altercation with DGM Racing No. 91 driver Kyle Weatherman at Atlanta. A variety of drivers would drive the No. 14 in 2024, including J. J. Yeley, R. C. Enerson, and Austin Green.

On December 19, 2024, it was announced that Garrett Smithley would drive the No. 14 full-time during the 2025 season. On January 24, 2025, it was announced that BRK Racing would form a sponsorship and ownership deal with the No. 14 car.

==== Car No. 14 results ====
Year	Driver	No.	Make	1	2	3	4	5	6	7	8	9	10	11	12	13	14	15	16	17	18	19	20	21	22	23	24	25	26	27	28	29	30	31	32	33	Owners	Pts
2024	Daniel Suárez	14	Chevy	DAY; 35																																	31st	388
2024	J. J. Yeley	14	Chevy		ATL; 24	LVS; 24	PHO; 19																														31st	388
2024	J. J. Yeley	14	Ford												CLT; 21															KAN; 20			LVS; 25				31st	388
2024	R.C. Enerson	14	Chevy					COA; 28																				GLN; 27									31st	388
2024	Logan Bearden	14	Chevy						RCH; 22	MAR; 30																											31st	388
2024	Logan Bearden	14	Ford																					MCH; 25													31st	388
2024	David Starr	14	Ford								TEX; 28			DAR; 24									IND; 26														31st	388
2024	David Starr	14	Chevy										DOV; 26					IOW; 17									ATL; 22				TAL; 8						31st	388
2024	Mason Massey	14	Chevy									TAL; 11							NHA; 30																		31st	388
2024	Mason Massey	14	Ford																			POC; 29															31st	388
2024	Andre Castro	14	Chevy													PIR; 23					CSC; 35																31st	388
2024	Brad Perez	14	Ford														SON; 24																				31st	388
2024	Chad Finchum	14	Ford																	NSH; 34						DAR; 33			BRI; 32								31st	388
2024	C. J. McLaughlin	14	Chevy																						DAY; 19												31st	388
2024	Nathan Byrd	14	Chevy																													ROV; 25					31st	388
2024	Austin Green	14	Chevy																															HOM; 29			31st	388
2024	Greg Van Alst	14	Ford																																MAR; 26		31st	388
2024	Greg Van Alst	14	Chevy																																	PHO; 37	31st	388
2025	Garrett Smithley	14	Chevy	DAY; 31	ATL; 24		PHO; 29	LVS; 28	HOM; 31	MAR; 15	DAR; 32	BRI; 29	CAR; 22	TAL; DNQ	TEX; 30	CLT; 26			POC; 26	ATL; 23			DOV; 35	IND; 25	IOW; 33	GLN; 38	DAY; 8	PIR; 25	GTW; 32		KAN; 34	ROV; DNQ	LVS; 32	TAL; 12	MAR; 30	PHO; 31	35th	298
2025	Carson Hocevar	14	Chevy			COA; 38																															35th	298
2025	Logan Bearden	14	Chevy														NSH; 23													BRI; 30							35th	298
2025	Josh Bilicki	14	Chevy															MXC; 24																			35th	298
2025	Connor Mosack	14	Chevy																		CSC; 26	SON; 33															35th	298

=== Car No. 15 history ===
In 2015, SSGLR partnered with the No. 15 team of Rick Ware Racing to have Ray Black Jr. drive that car at Texas in November. In that race, which was his Xfinity Series debut, Black Jr. finished 27th. Jimmy Weller III and B. J. McLeod also ran one race each in No. 15.

==== Car No. 15 results ====
Year	Driver	No.	Make	1	2	3	4	5	6	7	8	9	10	11	12	13	14	15	16	17	18	19	20	21	22	23	24	25	26	27	28	29	30	31	32	33	NXSC	Pts
2015	Jimmy Weller III	15	Chevy	DAY	ATL	LVS	PHO	CAL	TEX	BRI	RCH	TAL	IOW	CLT	DOV	MCH	CHI	DAY	KEN	NHA	IND	IOW	GLN	MOH	BRI	ROA	DAR	RCH	CHI; 26	KEN	DOV	CLT						
2015	B. J. McLeod	15	Chevy																														KAN; 33					
2015	Ray Black Jr.	15	Chevy																															TEX; 27	PHO	HOM		

=== Car No. 35 history ===
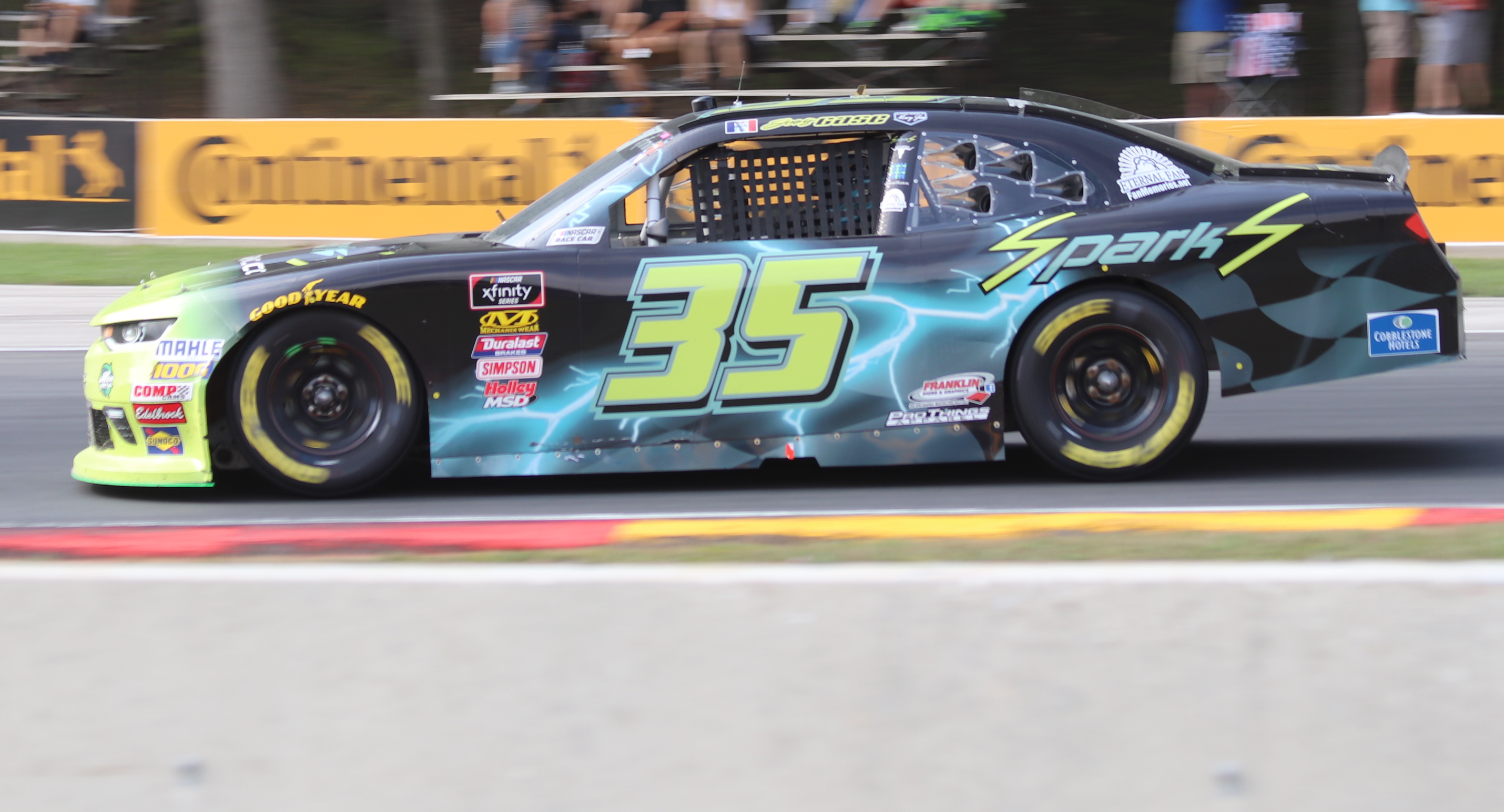
Joey Gase in the No. 35 in 2018

In 2018, SS-Green Light formed a partnership with Go Green Racing to field the No. 35 for Joey Gase. Gase would score a best finish of fifteenth three times and finished twentieth in points.

==== Car No. 35 results ====
Year	Driver	No.	Make	1	2	3	4	5	6	7	8	9	10	11	12	13	14	15	16	17	18	19	20	21	22	23	24	25	26	27	28	29	30	31	32	33	NXSC	Pts
2018	Joey Gase	35	Chevy	DAY; 33	ATL; 26	LVS; 20	PHO; 24	CAL; 16	TEX; 20	BRI; 16	RCH; 22	TAL; 21	DOV; 20	CLT; 17	POC; 19	MCH; 39	IOW; 21	CHI; 22	DAY; 32	KEN; 33	NHA; 22	IOW; 17	GLN; 22	MOH; 24	BRI; 18	ROA; 19	DAR; 21	IND; 15	LVS; 15	RCH; 22	CLT; 23	DOV; 30	KAN; 15	TEX; 22	PHO; 22	HOM; 23	20th	495

=== Car No. 55 history ===
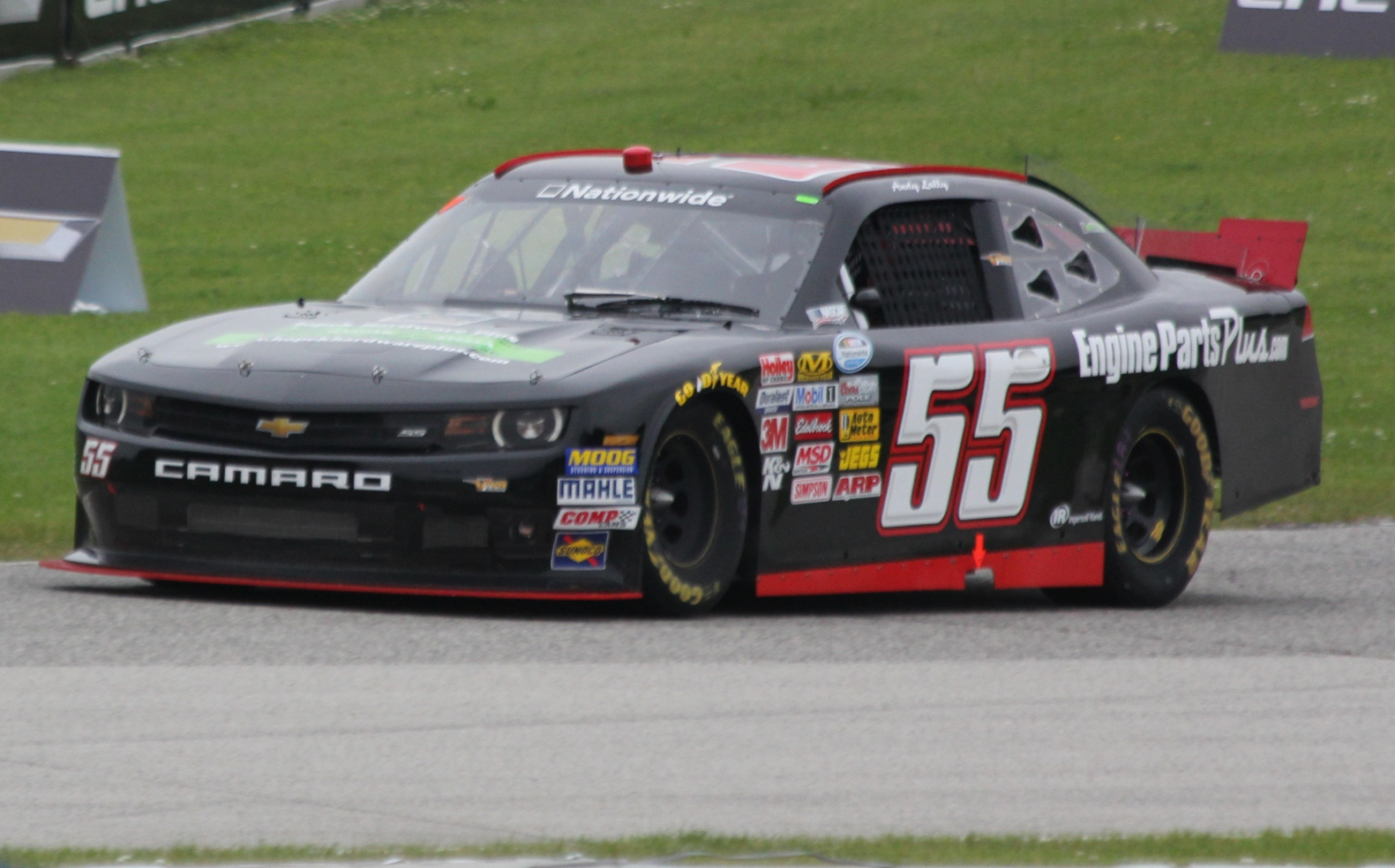
Andy Lally at Road America in 2014.

In April 2014, the team announced a partnership with Viva Motorsports to field the No. 55 car usually ran by Jamie Dick in select races. The team was fielded in the races that Viva wasn't using the No. 55 car. SS-Green Light's Nationwide Series program debuted on April 11 at Darlington Raceway with veteran Todd Bodine. Jimmy Weller III made his series debut the next week at Richmond, finishing 40th after a mechanical failure. Bodine ran a second race at Dover. Timmy Hill, Andy Lally, Caleb Roark and David Starr all ran single races for the team.

In July, Brennan Newberry made his Nationwide Series debut at Loudon in a partnership with NTS Motorsports and sponsor Qore-24. Newberry ran three races in the No. 55 with a best finish of nineteenth at Watkins Glen.

==== Car No. 55 results ====
Year	Driver	No.	Make	1	2	3	4	5	6	7	8	9	10	11	12	13	14	15	16	17	18	19	20	21	22	23	24	25	26	27	28	29	30	31	32	33	NXSC	Pts
2014	Todd Bodine	55	Chevy	DAY	PHO	LVS	BRI	CAL	TEX	DAR; 28					DOV; 36	MCH																						
2014	Jimmy Weller III	55	Chevy								RCH; 40	TAL																										
2014	Caleb Roark	55	Chevy										IOW; 32	CLT																								
2014	Andy Lally	55	Chevy														ROA; 7	KEN	DAY																			
2014	Brennan Newberry	55	Chevy																	NHA; 24	CHI	IND	IOW	GLN; 19					CHI; 23	KEN	DOV	KAN	CLT	TEX	PHO			
2014	Timmy Hill	55	Chevy																						MOH; 37	BRI	ATL	RCH										
2014	David Starr	55	Chevy																																	HOM; 30		

=== Car No. 76 history ===
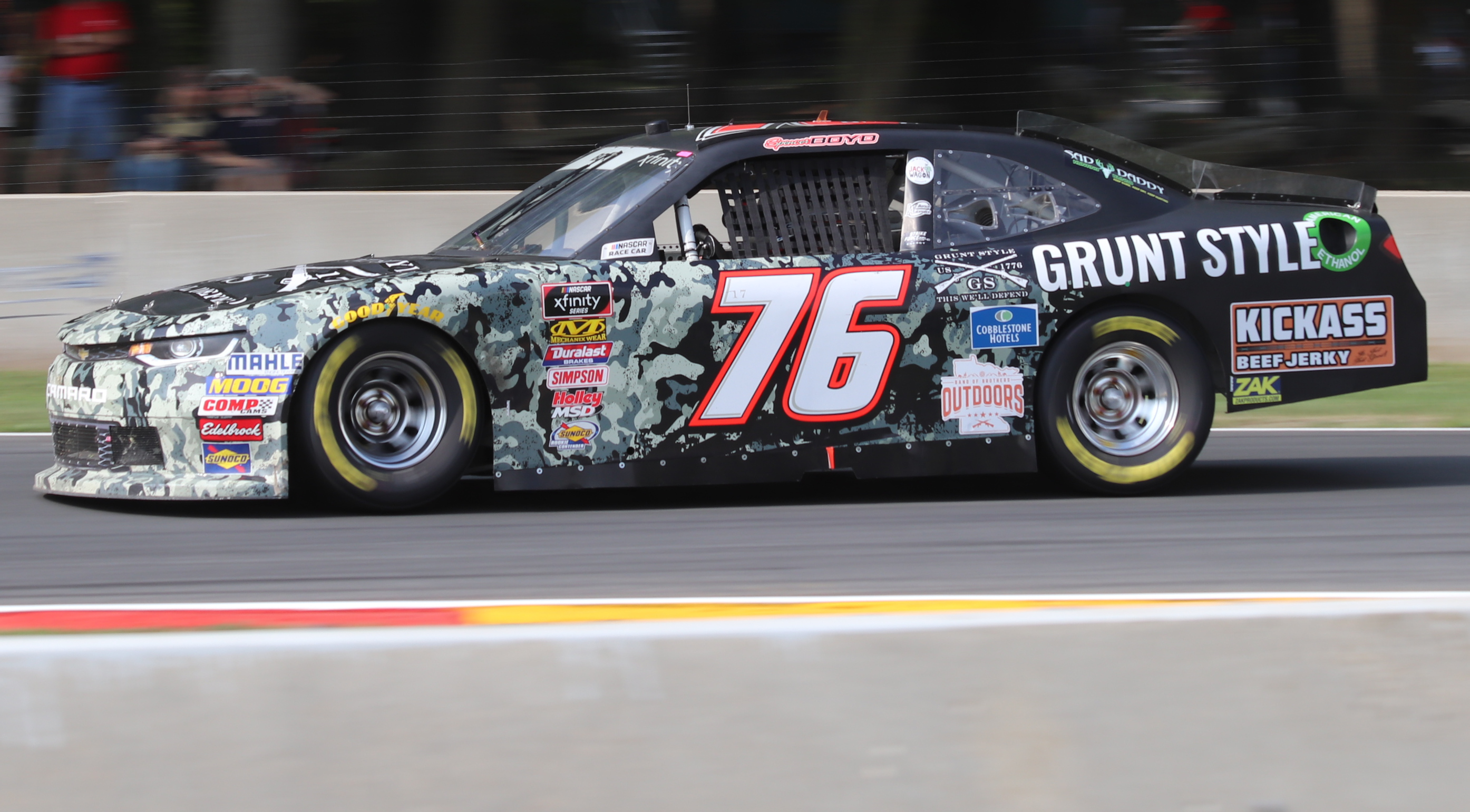
Spencer Boyd in the No. 76 in 2018

On October 19, 2017, it was announced that Spencer Boyd would drive the No. 76 Chevrolet Camaro full-time in 2018 for SSGLR. This would end up being the No. 07 team renumbered. The No. 76 came from sponsor Grunt Style's slogan/logo, which has the year 1776 on it because they sell Americana-themed products. Boyd would finish the year 26th in the final point standings, with a best race result of seventeenth. Boyd left for a Truck Series ride with Young's Motorsports for 2019.

==== Car No. 76 results ====
Year	Driver	No.	Make	1	2	3	4	5	6	7	8	9	10	11	12	13	14	15	16	17	18	19	20	21	22	23	24	25	26	27	28	29	30	31	32	33	NXSC	Pts
2018	Spencer Boyd	76	Chevy	DAY; 25	ATL; 29	LVS; 36	PHO; 30	CAL; 30	TEX; 25	BRI; 25	RCH; 28	TAL; 40	DOV; 30	CLT; 21	POC; 28	MCH; 22	IOW; 22	CHI; 29	DAY; 17	KEN; 24	NHA; 24	IOW; 23	GLN; 24	MOH; 25	BRI; 25	ROA; 21	DAR; 31	IND; 36	LVS; 22	RCH; 33	CLT; 29	DOV; 32	KAN; 19	TEX; 25	PHO; 28	HOM; 30	31st	302

=== Car No. 77 history ===
In 2014, Brennan Newberry made his fourth Xfinity career start with SS-Green Light/NTS Motorsports at Phoenix in the fall, now driving the No. 77 Qore24 Chevrolet, since Viva Motorsports was running the 55 car that race. Newberry finished 36th after an early crash.

==== Car No. 77 results ====
Year	Driver	No.	Make	1	2	3	4	5	6	7	8	9	10	11	12	13	14	15	16	17	18	19	20	21	22	23	24	25	26	27	28	29	30	31	32	33	NXSC	Pts
2014	Jimmy Weller III	77	Chevy	DAY	PHO	LVS	BRI	CAL	TEX	DAR	RCH	TAL	IOW	CLT	DOV	MCH	ROA	KEN	DAY	NHA	CHI	IND	IOW	GLN	MOH	BRI	ATL	RCH	CHI	KEN	DOV	KAN	CLT; DNQ	TEX				
2014	Brennan Newberry	77	Chevy																																PHO; 36	HOM		

=== Car No. 90 history ===
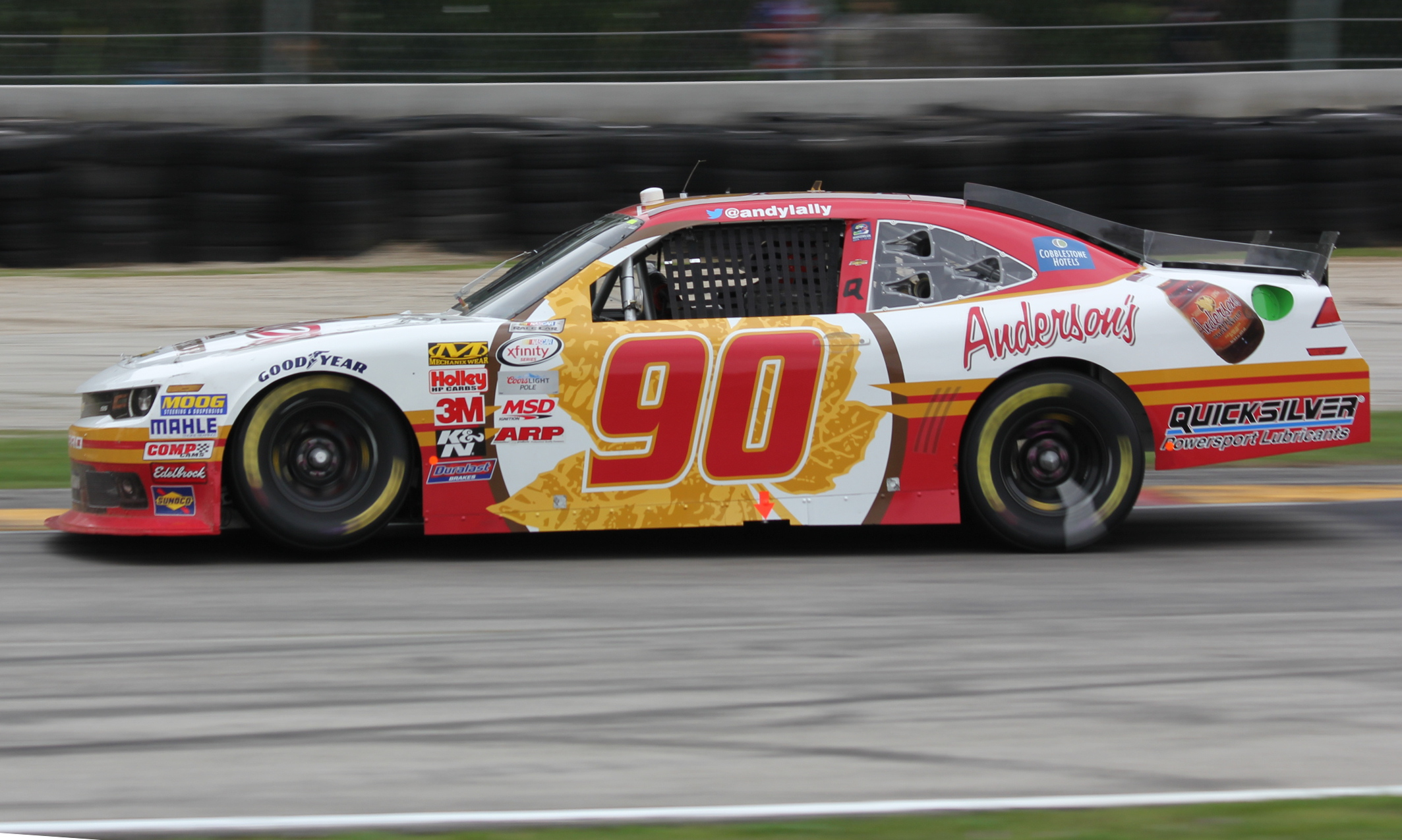
Andy Lally in the No. 90 in 2015

For 2015, the team allied with King Autosport to field the No. 90. It ran on weeks King Autosport wasn't using the No. 90 car. The team partnered with Rick Ware Racing to field the car in a few races, similar to the No. 15. Jimmy Weller III and Todd Bodine drove the No. 90 in four races each. Andy Lally drove two races, B. J. McLeod, Tyler Young and Korbin Forrister all ran single races for the team. In 2016, the team helped King Autosport to field the car in two races, one with Bodine at Watkins Glen and Lally at Mid-Ohio.

==== Car No. 90 results ====
Year	Driver	No.	Make	1	2	3	4	5	6	7	8	9	10	11	12	13	14	15	16	17	18	19	20	21	22	23	24	25	26	27	28	29	30	31	32	33	NXSC	Pts
2015	Jimmy Weller III	90	Chevy	DAY	ATL; 33	LVS	PHO	CAL	TEX		RCH; 33	TAL		CLT; 26	DOV	MCH	CHI	DAY														CLT; 30						
2015	Todd Bodine	90	Chevy							BRI; 24			IOW; 24										GLN; 19				DAR; 29	RCH	CHI	KEN	DOV							
2015	Tyler Young	90	Chevy																KEN; 28																			
2015	B. J. McLeod	90	Chevy																	NHA; 24	IND	IOW																
2015	Andy Lally	90	Chevy																					MOH; 21	BRI	ROA; 15												
2015	Korbin Forrister	90	Chevy																														KAN; 31	TEX	PHO	HOM		
2016	Todd Bodine	90	Chevy	DAY	ATL	LVS	PHO	CAL	TEX	BRI	RCH	TAL	DOV	CLT	POC	MCH	IOW	DAY	KEN	NHA	IND	IOW	GLN; 34	MOH	BRI	ROA	DAR	RCH	CHI	KEN	DOV	CLT	KAN	TEX	PHO	HOM	25th	477

=== Car No. 99 history ===
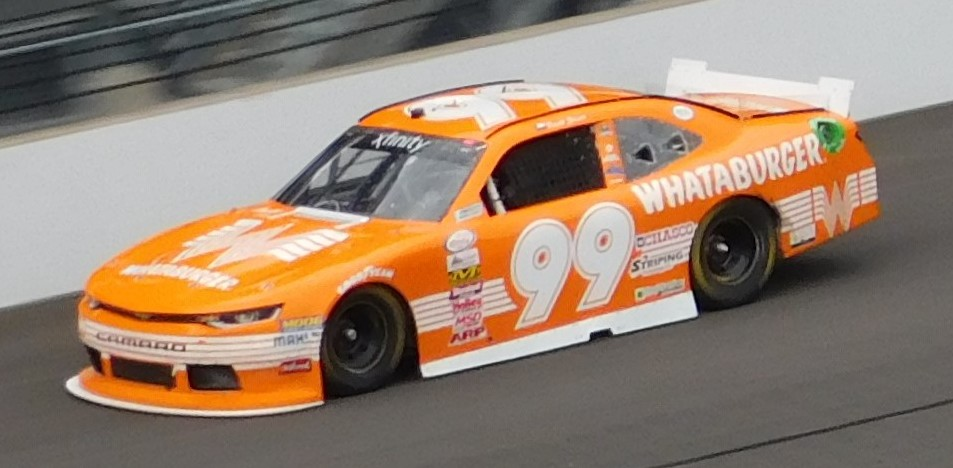
David Starr in the No. 99 in 2017

In 2017, SS-Green Light collaborated with B. J. McLeod Motorsports to jointly field McLeod's No. 99 car, with David Starr driving it for the full season. For the summer Daytona race only, Korbin Forrister was scheduled to replace Starr in the No. 99, but got the flu, and Starr ended up driving his normal car. In that race, Starr ended up getting a fifth-place finish, the only one of the season for both him and the team. The partnership ended in 2018, with Starr moving to the Jimmy Means Racing No. 52, and McLeod fielding the No. 99 by themselves in 2018.

==== Car No. 99 results ====
Year	Driver	No.	Make	1	2	3	4	5	6	7	8	9	10	11	12	13	14	15	16	17	18	19	20	21	22	23	24	25	26	27	28	29	30	31	32	33	NXSC	Pts
2017	David Starr	99	Chevy	DAY; 40	ATL; 32	LVS; 28	PHO; 32	CAL; 24	TEX; 24	BRI; 36	RCH; 17	TAL; 18	CLT; 31	DOV; 33	POC; 25	MCH; 21	IOW; 14	DAY; 5	KEN; 31	NHA; 30	IND; 29	IOW; 26	GLN; 30	MOH; 17	BRI; 40	ROA; 28	DAR; 36	RCH; 35	CHI; 22	KEN; 29	DOV; 38	CLT; 26	KAN; 27	TEX; 31	PHO; 29	HOM; 32	33rd	315

== Camping World Truck Series ==
=== Truck No. 0 history ===
In 2007, the team fielded the No. 0 with Sharon Rice listed as the owner. Brandon Knupp drove it first at Texas Motor Speedway, and finished 34th after suffering overheating. Three weeks later, Wayne Edwards drove the truck and finished last with a braking malfunction. In 2008, the No. 0 ran a part-time schedule with Christensen as the owner. Butch Miller drove most of the races, with two 32nd-place finish, along with Wayne Edwards, Chris Jones, Mike Olsen, Norm Benning, Johnny Chapman and Kevin Lepage.

==== Truck No. 0 results ====
Year	Driver	No.	Make	1	2	3	4	5	6	7	8	9	10	11	12	13	14	15	16	17	18	19	20	21	22	23	24	25	Owners	Pts
2007	Brandon Knupp	0	Chevy	DAY	CAL	ATL	MAR	KAN	CLT	MFD	DOV	TEX; 34	MCH	MLW																
2007	Wayne Edwards	0	Chevy												MEM; 36	KEN	IRP	NSH	BRI	GTW	NHA	LVS	TAL	MAR	ATL	TEX	PHO	HOM		
2008	Butch Miller	0	Chevy	DAY	CAL; 35	ATL; 32	MAR				DOV; 36	TEX; 32								GTW; 35						TEX; 27	PHO; 35			
2008	Wayne Edwards	0	Chevy					KAN; 36	CLT	MFD					MEM; 35	KEN									ATL; 33					
2008	Chris Jones	0	Chevy										MCH; 34					NSH; 32	BRI			LVS; 31		MAR; 32						
2008	Johnny Chapman	0	Chevy											MLW; 36			IRP; 34													
2008	Mike Olsen	0	Chevy																		NHA; 32									
2008	Norm Benning	0	Chevy																				TAL; 32							
2008	Kevin Lepage	0	Chevy																									HOM; 36		

=== Truck No. 03 history ===
In 2006, Green Light Racing fielded the No. 03 truck as a start and park entry when the entry list was short. Wayne Edwards drove the 03 truck first, finishing 36th and 35th respectively. Johnny Chapman then drove at Texas Motor Speedway, finishing 35th.

==== Truck No. 03 results ====
Year	Driver	No.	Make	1	2	3	4	5	6	7	8	9	10	11	12	13	14	15	16	17	18	19	20	21	22	23	24	25	Owners	Pts
2006	Wayne Edwards	03	Chevy	DAY	CAL	ATL	MAR	GTY	CLT	MFD	DOV	TEX	MCH	MLW	KAN	KEN	MEM	IRP	NSH	BRI	NHA	LVS; 36	TAL; 35	MAR	ATL					
2006	Johnny Chapman	03	Chevy																							TEX; 35	PHO	HOM		

=== Truck No. 06 history ===
In 2007, Greenlight Racing fielded the No. 06 truck part-time. The drivers were Morgan Shepherd, Blake Mallory, Randy MacDonald, Bobby Dotter, Wayne Edwards, and Brandon Knupp.

==== Truck No. 06 results ====
Year	Driver	No.	Make	1	2	3	4	5	6	7	8	9	10	11	12	13	14	15	16	17	18	19	20	21	22	23	24	25	Owners	Pts
2007	Morgan Shepherd	06	Chevy	DAY	CAL	ATL	MAR	KAN	CLT	MFD	DOV; 29																			
2007	Blake Mallory	06	Chevy									TEX; 36	MCH																	
2007	Randy MacDonald	06	Chevy											MLW; 36																
2007	Bobby Dotter	06	Chevy												MEM; 35							LVS; 35								
2007	Wayne Edwards	06	Chevy													KEN; 35	IRP						TAL; 36							
2007	Brandon Knupp	06	Chevy															NSH; 35	BRI	GTW	NHA									
2007	Casey Kingsland	06	Chevy																			LVS; QL^{†}								
2007	Devin Scites	06	Chevy																					MAR; DNQ	ATL	TEX	PHO	HOM		

=== Truck No. 07 history ===
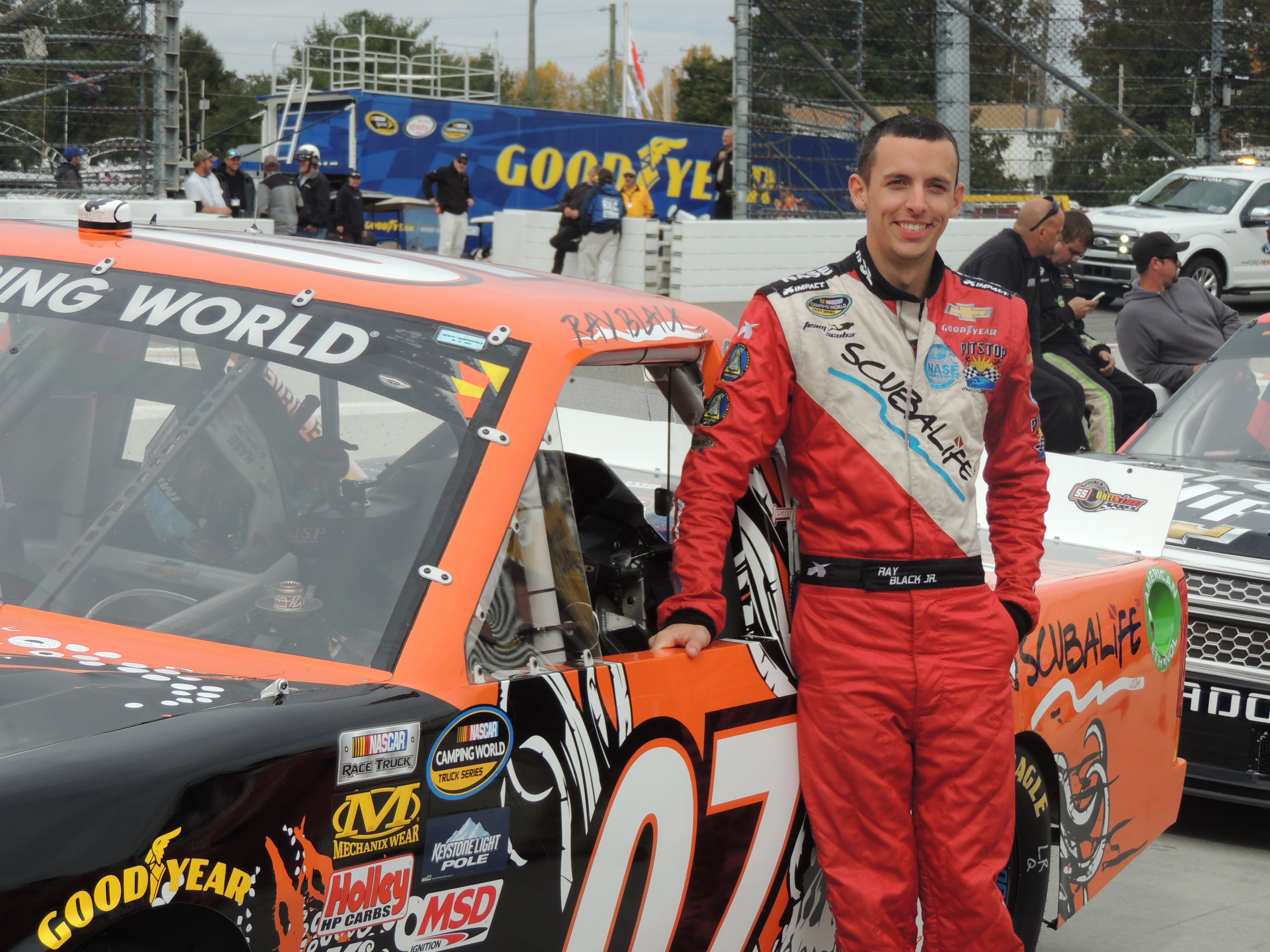
Ray Black Jr. standing beside his No. 07 in 2015

The No. 07 truck began racing in 2001 with the former owner Gene Christensen driving the Racing For Kids Chevrolet. He failed to finish higher than 30th that season and completed just 63 laps total. Aaron Daniel and Mike Olsen drove the No. 07 for a total of three races that season in addition. Jason Small began racing the No. 07 full-time the following season with Sunbelt Rentals sponsoring. He had two top-tens and finished 22nd in the points standings. Rich Bickle drove the No. 07 at the season opener in 2003, before Bobby Dotter drove for several races in the truck. Jeremy Mayfield had a sixth-place finish the following race at Lowe's, with Stan Boyd and Blake Mallory driving in select races afterward. Johnny Chapman would then drive for six races, with Ryan Hanson and Mark McFarland driving in between. Dotter and Shane Sieg would finish out the year in the truck. Ricky Moxley drove the No. 07 truck for the Lucas Oil Camping world truck series in INDY.

In 2004, Sieg was hired as the full-time driver with Auto Air Colors sponsoring. Despite an eighth-place finish at Milwaukee, he was released before the final quarter of the season, and Sean Murphy and Andy Houston would end the season in the truck. Murphy would be hired to drive the No. 07 for the first five races of the season, and after one thirteenth-place finish, Butch Miller took over at Mansfield, and finished tenth. Rich Bickle, Chris Wimmer and Eric Norris also raced the No. 07, before Jack Bailey drove a total of six races, with a best finish of 26th. Chase Pistone, José Luis Ramírez and Wimmer finished out the season in the truck. Murphy returned at the beginning of the 2006 season but did not last long, with Clint Bowyer finishing seventh at Martinsville in the Jack Daniel's truck. Justin Martz, Robert Turner, Johnny Chapman and Butch Miller drove one race apiece, with Kevin Lepage driving a pair of races with Roadloans.com sponsorship. Chad McCumbee drove the No. 07 for a pair of races, when U.S. Restoration became the team's new primary sponsor. Travis Kittleson then became the team's new driver for three races, his best a sixteenth at Nashville Superspeedway. T. J. Bell would drive for one race, and John Mickel brought sponsorship from Torquespeed and leased out the No. 07 for the rest of the season, his best finish twentieth.

After the 2006 season, Tim Sauter and Lester Buildings joined the team for 2007. Despite only one top-ten finish, Sauter finished sixteenth in the points but was runner up to Willie Allen for Rookie of the Year. Both Sauter and Lester Buildings departed at the season's end, possibly due to the struggles of the housing market. Shane Seig, Sean Murphy, and Ryan Lawler shared the ride in 2008 with ASI Limited.

In 2009, Chad McCumbee returned to SS Green Light Racing to drive the No. 07 in 21 races. With part-time sponsorship from Tiwi and Valvoline, he had five top-ten finishes and finished 19th in points. Jason Young and Burt Myers filled in the rest of the schedule. Sean Murphy opened the 2010 season by finishing 13th at Daytona with Dietz & Watson sponsoring. For the rest of the season, Donny Lia and Tony Jackson split the driving duties, with Jackson scheduled to run seven races. After a long string of bad luck, Lia departed the No. 07 team after the O'Reilly 200 at Bristol.

For 2011, the team swapped between Toyota and Chevrolet. Donnie Neuenberger drove at Daytona and B. J. McLeod drove at Phoenix with Boggy Creek Airboat Rides. Johnny Chapman drove a few races in the truck, mostly as a start and park. In 2012, the No. 07's lineup added on former Pro Cup driver Jeff Agnew, as well as T. J. Duke.

For 2015, Ray Black Jr. piloted the car full-time with the sponsorship ScubaLife.com. He finished 12th in the points standings in 2015, including a fifth-place finish at Daytona.

For 2016, Black Jr. moved to the Xfinity Series, and the team had multiple drivers throughout the season, starting with French driver Michel Disdier at Daytona with Pray For Paris as his sponsor. He finished 11th after avoiding two big ones.

In 2017, SS-Green Light decided to close down their Truck team to focus on competing in the Xfinity Series, and they sold their equipment and owner points to Rick Ware Racing, which fielded the No. 12 truck that year.

==== Truck No. 07 results ====
Year	Driver	No.	Make	1	2	3	4	5	6	7	8	9	10	11	12	13	14	15	16	17	18	19	20	21	22	23	24	25	Owners	Pts
2001	Gene Christensen	07	Chevy	DAY	HOM	MMR	MAR	GTY	DAR	PPR	DOV	TEX; 36	MEM; 30	MLW; 32		KEN; 35				CIC; 35	RCH	SBO	TEX		LVS; 35	PHO; DNQ				
2001	Aaron Daniel	07	Chevy												KAN; 17															
2001	Mike Olsen	07	Chevy														NHA; 29							NZH; 30						
2001	Mike Harmon	07	Chevy															IRP; DNQ												
2001	Donny Morelock	07	Chevy																NSH; DNQ											
2001	Ronnie Hornaday	07	Chevy																								CAL; DNQ			
2002	Jason Small	07	Chevy	DAY; 9	DAR; 21	MAR; 13	GTY; 21	PPR; 22	DOV; 21	TEX; 25	MEM; 33	MLW; 26	KAN; 30	KEN; 29	NHA; 32	MCH; 19	IRP; 25	NSH; 15	RCH; 24	TEX; 14	SBO; 27	LVS; 10	CAL; 24	PHO; 29	HOM; 22					
2003	Rich Bickle	07	Chevy	DAY; 19																										
2003	Bobby Dotter	07	Chevy		DAR; 32	MMR; 25	MAR; 34					MLW; 30	KAN; DNQ								NHA; 29		LVS; 17	SBO; 11			PHO; 21			
2003	Jeremy Mayfield	07	Dodge					CLT; 6																						
2003	Stan Boyd	07	Chevy						DOV; 28	TEX; 29																				
2003	Blake Mallory	07	Chevy								MEM; 31																			
2003	Johnny Chapman	07	Chevy											KEN; 27		MCH; 26	IRP; 36	NSH; 17	BRI; 30			CAL; 19								
2003	Ryan Henson	07	Chevy												GTY; 23															
2003	Mark McFarland	07	Chevy																	RCH; 12										
2003	Shane Sieg	07	Chevy																						TEX; 19			HOM; 17		
2003	Alex Müller	07	Chevy																							MAR; 25				
2004	Shane Sieg	07	Chevy	DAY; 23	ATL; 13	MAR; 20	MFD; 12	CLT; 32	DOV; 15	TEX; 14	MEM; 22	MLW; 8	KAN; 16	KEN; 13	GTW; 11	MCH; 26	IRP; 21	NSH; 26	BRI; 26	RCH; 18	NHA; 23	LVS; 26								
2004	Johnny Chapman	07	Chevy																				CAL; 20							
2004	Andy Houston	07	Chevy																					TEX; 14			DAR; 34			
2004	Sean Murphy	07	Chevy																						MAR; 22	PHO; 24		HOM; 30		
2005	Sean Murphy	07	Chevy	DAY; 24	CAL; 19	ATL; 13	MAR; 31	GTY; 29		CLT; 29			MCH; 18																	
2005	Butch Miller	07	Chevy						MFD; 10																					
2005	Rich Bickle	07	Chevy								DOV; 27								NSH; 27											
2005	Eric Norris	07	Chevy									TEX; 12				KEN; 32							LVS; 20		ATL; 35					
2005	Chris Wimmer	07	Chevy											MLW; 22			MEM; 17			BRI; 35								HOM; 33		
2005	Kevin Hamlin	07	Chevy												KAN; 23															
2005	Jack Bailey	07	Ford															IRP; 29												
2005	Jack Bailey	07	Chevy																		RCH; 31	NHA; 26				TEX; 36				
2005	Chase Pistone	07	Chevy																					MAR; 35						
2005	José Luis Ramírez	07	Ford																								PHO; 29			
2006	Sean Murphy	07	Chevy	DAY; 20		ATL; 32																	TAL; 32							
2006	Eric Norris	07	Chevy		CAL; 35																									
2006	Clint Bowyer	07	Chevy				MAR; 7																							
2006	Justin Martz	07	Chevy					GTY; 20																						
2006	Johnny Chapman	07	Chevy						CLT; 29						KAN; 33															
2006	Robert Turner	07	Chevy							MFD; 32								IRP; 26												
2006	Kevin Lepage	07	Chevy								DOV; 28		MCH; 21																	
2006	Butch Miller	07	Chevy									TEX; 31																		
2006	Chad McCumbee	07	Chevy											MLW; 14			MEM; 22													
2006	Wayne Edwards	07	Chevy													KEN; 33														
2006	Travis Kittleson	07	Chevy																NSH; 16	BRI; 30		LVS; 31								
2006	T. J. Bell	07	Chevy																		NHA; 21									
2006	John Mickel	07	Chevy																					MAR; 31	ATL; 20	TEX; 25	PHO; 25	HOM; 29		
2007	Tim Sauter	07	Chevy	DAY; 28	CAL; 26	ATL; 21	MAR; 29	KAN; 30	CLT; 17	MFD; 14	DOV; 23	TEX; 16	MCH; 11	MLW; 26	MEM; 18	KEN; 21	IRP; 28	NSH; 31	BRI; 28	GTW; 31	NHA; 23	LVS; 20	TAL; 21	MAR; 27	ATL; 21	TEX; 10	PHO; 24	HOM; 11		
2008	Shane Sieg	07	Chevy	DAY; 23		ATL; 31																								
2008	Mike Bliss	07	Chevy		CAL; 24																									
2008	Ryan Lawler	07	Chevy				MAR; 17	KAN; 32			DOV; 28	TEX; 18			MEM; 21	KEN; 17														
2008	John Mickel	07	Chevy						CLT; 31																					
2008	Sean Murphy	07	Chevy							MFD; 9				MLW; 26			IRP; 27		BRI; 17			LVS; 15	TAL; 30							
2008	J. C. Stout	07	Chevy										MCH; 32																	
2008	Brandon Knupp	07	Chevy															NSH; 31												
2008	Chris Jones	07	Chevy																	GTW; 34										
2008	Butch Miller	07	Chevy																		NHA; 31									
2008	Johnny Sauter	07	Chevy																					MAR; 23						
2008	Max Papis	07	Toyota																							TEX; 29		HOM; 27		
2008	Johnny Chapman	07	Chevy																								PHO; 33			
2009	Chad McCumbee	07	Chevy	DAY; 19	CAL; 3	ATL; 6	MAR; 28	KAN; 8	CLT; 15	DOV; 7	TEX; 13	MCH; 24	MLW; 25		KEN; 11	IRP; 32		BRI; 27	CHI; 7	IOW; 15		NHA; 29	LVS; 16		TAL; 24	TEX; 20	PHO; 15	HOM; 11		
2009	Jason Young	07	Chevy											MEM; 24			NSH; 20				GTW; 14									
2009	Burt Myers	07	Chevy																					MAR; 19						
2010	Sean Murphy	07	Chevy	DAY; 13																										
2010	Donny Lia	07	Chevy		ATL; 16		NSH; 22		DOV; 19	CLT; 26			IOW; 26					DAR; 25												
2010	Donny Lia	07	Dodge									MCH; 13																		
2010	Donny Lia	07	Toyota																BRI; 30											
2010	Tony Jackson Jr.	07	Chevy			MAR; 20		KAN; 15			TEX; 21			GTY; 18						CHI; 17			LVS; 17		TAL; 26					
2010	Butch Miller	07	Dodge													POC; 34	NSH; 18				KEN; 35	NHA; 32								
2010	Butch Miller	07	Toyota																							TEX; 35	PHO; 36			
2010	John King	07	Chevy																					MAR; 19						
2010	John King	07	Ford																									HOM; 27		
2011	B. J. McLeod	07	Chevy	DAY	PHO; 35	DAR																								
2011	Caleb Roark	07	Chevy				MAR; 19							IOW; 24							CHI; 22									
2011	Johnny Chapman	07	Chevy					NSH; 35	DOV; 31				KEN; 23		NSH; 32					ATL; 34										
2011	Johnny Chapman	07	Toyota									TEX; 33															TEX; 29	HOM; 36		
2011	J. J. Yeley	07	Toyota							CLT; 34																				
2011	Scott Riggs	07	Toyota								KAN; 36																			
2011	Ricky Moxley	07	Toyota													IRP; 30														
2011	Chad McCumbee	07	Toyota														POC; 26													
2011	Butch Miller	07	Chevy															MCH; 27				NHA; 30			TAL; 33					
2011	Butch Miller	07	Toyota																					LVS; 24						
2011	John King	07	Toyota																BRI; 32				KEN; 27							
2011	T. J. Duke	07	Toyota																							MAR; 34				
2012	T. J. Duke	07	Chevy	DAY; 31																										
2012	Jake Crum	07	Chevy		MAR; 18																									
2012	Johnny Chapman	07	Toyota			CAR; 35		CLT; DNQ		TEX; 31			CHI; 36		MCH; 26		ATL; 32			LVS; 30	TAL; 32									
2012	Chris Jones	07	Toyota				KAN; 35		DOV; 31																					
2012	Jeff Agnew	07	Chevy								KEN; 27	IOW; 21				BRI; 32			KEN; 17			MAR; 21	TEX; 25		HOM; 24					
2012	Jeff Agnew	07	Toyota											POC; 31																
2012	Caleb Roark	07	Chevy															IOW; 32												
2012	Ross Chastain	07	Chevy																					PHO; 33						
2013	Chris Cockrum	07	Toyota	DAY; 15						TEX; 28	KEN										TAL; 34									
2013	Chris Cockrum	07	Chevy					CLT; 22																						
2013	Grant Galloway	07	Toyota		MAR; 22																									
2013	Johnny Chapman	07	Chevy			CAR; 28																								
2013	Jamie Dick	07	Chevy				KAN; 30																							
2013	C. J. Faison	07	Chevy						DOV; 30																					
2013	Josh Reaume	07	Chevy									IOW; 25																		
2013	Jimmy Weller III	07	Chevy										ELD; DNQ																	
2013	Jimmy Weller III	07	Toyota															IOW; 35	CHI; 25			MAR; 36								
2013	J. J. Yeley	07	Toyota											POC; 33											HOM; 36					
2013	J. J. Yeley	07	Chevy												MCH; 24								TEX; 33	PHO; 35						
2013	Jake Crum	07	Toyota													BRI; 19														
2013	Carl Long	07	Chevy														MSP; 29													
2013	Caleb Roark	07	Toyota																	LVS; 28										
2014	Michel Disdier	07	Chevy	DAY; 24																										
2014	Ray Black Jr.	07	Chevy		MAR; 24					GTW; 24																				
2014	Jimmy Weller III	07	Chevy			KAN; 25																								
2014	Blake Koch	07	Chevy				CLT; 30																							
2014	Jake Crum	07	Chevy					DOV; 29																						
2014	B. J. McLeod	07	Chevy						TEX; 25					POC; 30		BRI; 34			NHA; 26	LVS; 27				PHO; 32	HOM					
2014	J. J. Yeley	07	Chevy								KEN; 29																			
2014	Korbin Forrister	07	Chevy									IOW; 33									TAL; 19	MAR								
2014	Jared Landers	07	Chevy										ELD; DNQ																	
2014	Todd Peck	07	Chevy												MCH; 27															
2014	Ray Courtemanche Jr.	07	Chevy														MSP; 20													
2014	Todd Shafer	07	Chevy															CHI; 25												
2014	Ryan Lynch	07	Chevy																				TEX; 22							
2015	Ray Black Jr.	07	Chevy	DAY; 5	ATL; 25	MAR; 13	KAN; 21	CLT; 22	DOV; 11	TEX; 16	GTW; 13	IOW; 15	KEN; 13	ELD; 15	POC; 24	MCH; 26	BRI; 21	MSP; 15	CHI; 11	NHA; 13	LVS; 12	TAL; 14	MAR; 20	TEX; 19	PHO; 20	HOM; 18				
2016	Michel Disdier	07	Chevy	DAY; 11																										
2016	J. J. Yeley	07	Chevy		ATL; 24	MAR																								
2016	B. J. McLeod	07	Chevy				KAN; 15																							
2016	C. J. Faison	07	Chevy					DOV; 25																						
2016	Garrett Smithley	07	Chevy						CLT; 29				KEN; 21																	
2016	Ryan Lynch	07	Chevy							TEX; 26																				
2016	Casey Smith	07	Chevy								IOW; 22	GTW																		
2016	Sheldon Creed	07	Chevy											ELD; 16																
2016	Todd Peck	07	Chevy												POC; 21		MCH; 29													
2016	Matt Mills	07	Chevy													BRI; 27				NHA; 23				TEX; 29	PHO; 21					
2016	Cody Ware	07	Chevy															MSP; 17				TAL; 21	MAR							
2016	Ray Black Jr.	07	Chevy																CHI; 18											
2016	Patrick Staropoli	07	Chevy																							HOM; 31				

=== Truck No. 08 history ===
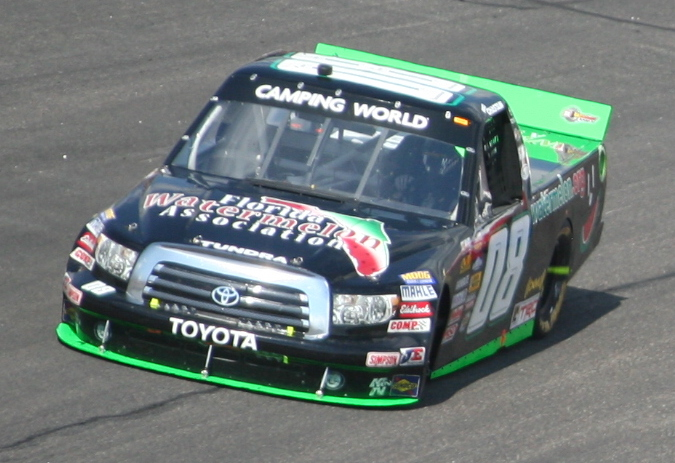
Ross Chastain in the No. 08 in 2012

For the 2001 season, Bobby Dotter would drive the No. 08 full-time while campaigning for Rookie of the Year. He had a tenth-place finish at IRP and finished fifteenth in points. He continued to drive the No. 08 truck in 2002, posting four top-ten finishes and finishing a career-best fourteenth in points. In 2003, rookie Jody Lavender was hired as the team's driver for most of the season, bringing sponsorship from Lavender's Discount Carpets and Hartsville Community Bank. He finished seventeenth in points that year despite missing four races. He was replaced in those races by Dotter and Shane Sieg, who ran two races apiece.

Ken Weaver was hired as the next driver of the 08 truck in 2004, bringing 1-800-4-A-Phone as sponsorship, and he raced a total of fifteen times, with a best finish of 18th at Texas Motor Speedway. Various other drivers raced the No. 08 truck that season, including Dotter, Tony Raines, A. J. Fike, Butch Miller, Bill Manfull and Sean Murphy. Weaver started driving the No. 08 truck for the first three races in 2005, and had a sixth-place finish at Daytona International Speedway before he left the team. Without a primary sponsor, the team began racing with the driver-by committee schedule, and Tam Topham drove for the team at Martinsville Speedway, before Rich Bickle drove the next two races, and finished fifth at Mansfield. Butch Miller and Kevin Lepage drove one race apiece, before Johnny Chapman drove in four of the next five races. Miller and Topham raced another time in the 08 that year, along with Jarit Johnson, Chris Wimmer, Mark McFarland and Jack Bailey.

In 2006, Bobby Hamilton Jr. raced in the first three races of the season with Corky's BBQ and Ribs sponsoring the team's Dodge, before he left to drive full-time for his father's team. Butch Miller drove the next week at Martinsville, and Boris Jurkovic followed at the following race, when the team returned to Chevrolet. Mike Greenwell made his debut at Mansfield, finishing 26th, and after Johnny Chapman drove at Dover, Chad McCumbee was hired as Green Light Racing's first full-time driver in two years. Except for two races where Chris Wimmer and Mike Greenwell raced, McCumbee drove the 08 for the rest of the season, posting two seventh-place finishes, and was runner-up for Rookie of the Year despite missing the season opener at Daytona. He was hired to race the No. 08 for the 2007 season, skipping the Sam's Town 400 due to making his NEXTEL Cup debut at Pocono Raceway, being replaced by Eric Norris. He left for MRD Motorsports late in the season, and Shane Sieg took his place, for a couple of races, with Dennis Setzer driving at New Hampshire. Chris Jones took over the ride starting at Martinsville. For 2008, Jason White brought sponsorship from GunBroker.com, along with the team's manufacturer change to Dodge. They did not have any top-ten finishes and ended the season nineteenth in points. Butch Miller became the team's primary driver in 2009, with Johnny Chapman, Lepage, Murphy, and Brandon Knupp filling in. The team ran completed races with Tim Brown, Chrissy Wallace, Jamie Dick and Brett Butler.

In 2012, the No. 08 returned and was driven by Florida native Ross Chastain. He scored a third place finish at Bristol, as well as three top-tens. Sometimes in the season, he had to start and park, due to lack of funding. he would end his season seventeenth in points. Chastain would later depart for Brad Keselowski Racing.

For 2014, the team reverted to No. 08 Chevrolet Silverado. Jimmy Weller III opened the season with a ninth place finish at Daytona. In 2015, Korbin Forrister took over the driving duty of the No. 08 Chevrolet Silverado in a partnership with B. J. McLeod Motorsports.

In 2016, the No. 08 team shut down, and Forrister moved to Lira Motorsports No. 59 truck. SS-Green Light would only field the No. 07 that year, which was their last one in the Truck Series.

==== Truck No. 08 results ====
Year	Driver	No.	Make	1	2	3	4	5	6	7	8	9	10	11	12	13	14	15	16	17	18	19	20	21	22	23	24	25	Owners	Pts
2001	Bobby Dotter	08	Chevy	DAY; 14	HOM; 21	MMR; 17	MAR; 33	GTY; 24	DAR; 16	PPR; 15	DOV; 15	TEX; 23	MEM; 18	MLW; 27	KAN; 25	KEN; 26	NHA; 20	IRP; 10	NSH; 18	CIC; 13	NZH; 25	RCH; 15	SBO; 11	TEX; 15	LVS; 19	PHO; 27	CAL; 15			
2002	Bobby Dotter	08	Chevy	DAY; 36	DAR; 12	MAR; 4	GTY; 15		DOV; 14	TEX; 17	MEM; 19	MLW; 12	KAN; 15	KEN; 27	NHA; 19	MCH; 28	IRP; 9	NSH; 14	RCH; 9	TEX; 15	SBO; 8	LVS; 16	CAL; 15	PHO; 12	HOM; 20					
2002	Bobby Dotter	08	Dodge					PPR; 20																						
2003	Bobby Dotter	08	Chevy	DAY; 11																		CAL; 22								
2003	Jody Lavender	08	Chevy		DAR; 25	MMR; 27	MAR; 23	CLT; 18	DOV; 13	TEX; 15	MEM; 13	MLW; 24	KAN; 20	KEN; 24	GTW; 16	MCH; 23	IRP; 21	NSH; 18	BRI; 22	RCH; 19				SBO; 19	TEX; 16	MAR; 26	PHO; 22	HOM; 16		
2003	Shane Sieg	08	Chevy																		NHA; 16		LVS; 15							
2004	Ken Weaver	08	Chevy	DAY; 35		MAR; 28	MFD; 33	CLT; 23	DOV; 22	TEX; 18	MEM; 34	MLW; 31	KAN; 20	KEN; 26	GTW; 22		IRP; DNQ	NSH; 34				LVS; 29		TEX; 24		PHO; 32		HOM; DNQ		
2004	Tony Raines	08	Chevy		ATL; 17																									
2004	Johnny Chapman	08	Chevy													MCH; 19														
2004	A. J. Fike	08	Chevy																BRI; 33											
2004	Butch Miller	08	Chevy																	RCH; 15										
2004	Bobby Dotter	08	Chevy																		NHA; 26		CAL; 34							
2004	Bill Manfull	08	Chevy																						MAR; 36					
2004	Sean Murphy	08	Chevy																								DAR; 32			
2005	Ken Weaver	08	Chevy	DAY; 6	CAL; 35	ATL; 28																								
2005	Tam Topham	08	Chevy				MAR; 34										MEM; 34													
2005	Rich Bickle	08	Chevy					GTY; 36	MFD; 5					MLW; 28																
2005	Butch Miller	08	Chevy							CLT; 16								IRP; 23												
2005	Kevin Lepage	08	Chevy								DOV; 19																			
2005	Johnny Chapman	08	Chevy									TEX; 36	MCH; 23		KAN; 35	KEN; 21														
2005	Chris Wimmer	08	Chevy																NSH; 34						ATL; 17					
2005	Bill Manfull	08	Ford																	BRI; 34										
2005	Jarit Johnson	08	Chevy																		RCH; 25			MAR; 28						
2005	José Luis Ramírez	08	Chevy																			NHA; 36								
2005	Jack Bailey	08	Chevy																				LVS; 17					HOM; 28		
2005	Mark McFarland	08	Chevy																							TEX; 30				
2005	Willie Allen	08	Chevy																								PHO; 34			
2006	Bobby Hamilton Jr.	08	Dodge	DAY; 7	CAL; 22	ATL; 19																								
2006	Butch Miller	08	Chevy				MAR; 27																							
2006	Boris Jurkovic	08	Chevy					GTY; 25																						
2006	Sean Murphy	08	Chevy						CLT; 30																					
2006	Mike Greenwell	08	Chevy							MFD; 26							MEM; 33													
2006	Johnny Chapman	08	Chevy								DOV; 34																			
2006	Chad McCumbee	08	Chevy									TEX; 9	MCH; 18		KAN; 13	KEN; 18		IRP; 17	NSH; 7	BRI; 25	NHA; 20	LVS; 34	TAL; 30	MAR; 27	ATL; 7	TEX; 13	PHO; 29	HOM; 13		
2006	Chris Wimmer	08	Chevy											MLW; 36																
2007	Chad McCumbee	08	Chevy	DAY; 13	CAL; 27	ATL; 18	MAR; 24	KAN; 27	CLT; 18	MFD; 14	DOV; 13		MCH; 19	MLW; 23	MEM; 26	KEN; 20	IRP; 34	NSH; 32												
2007	Eric Norris	08	Chevy									TEX; 20																		
2007	Shane Sieg	08	Chevy																BRI; 25											
2007	Boris Jurkovic	08	Chevy																	GTW; 21										
2007	Dennis Setzer	08	Chevy																		NHA; 30									
2007	Johnny Chapman	08	Chevy																			LVS; 34								
2007	Marc Mitchell	08	Chevy																				TAL; 33							
2007	Chris Jones	08	Chevy																					MAR; 21			PHO; 27	HOM; 31		
2007	Travis Kittleson	08	Chevy																						ATL; 28	TEX; 36				
2008	Jason White	08	Dodge	DAY; 22	CAL; 30	ATL; 24	MAR; 27	KAN; 15	CLT; 26	MFD; 29	DOV; 30	TEX; 29	MCH; 28	MLW; 17	MEM; 25	KEN; 18	IRP; 18	NSH; 28	BRI; 18	GTW; 30		LVS; 17	TAL; 29		ATL; 18	TEX; 25	PHO; 20	HOM; 23		
2008	Bobby Dotter	08	Dodge																		NHA; 30									
2008	Ryan Lawler	08	Dodge																					MAR; 27						
2009	Butch Miller	08	Chevy	DAY; 30	CAL; 31	ATL; 34		KAN; 29			TEX; 26		MLW; 31	MEM; 35		IRP; 33	NSH; 32	BRI; 35			GTW; 31		LVS; 32							
2009	Sean Murphy	08	Chevy				MAR; 36					MCH; 35			KEN; 31															
2009	Johnny Chapman	08	Chevy						CLT; 33										CHI; 33							TEX; 34				
2009	Kevin Lepage	08	Chevy							DOV; 33																				
2009	Jamie Dick	08	Chevy																	IOW; 22							PHO; 21			
2009	Brandon Knupp	08	Chevy																			NHA; 36								
2009	Tim Brown	08	Chevy																					MAR; 36						
2009	Chrissy Wallace	08	Chevy																						TAL; 13					
2009	Brett Butler	08	Chevy																									HOM; 24		
2012	Ross Chastain	08	Toyota	DAY; 28	MAR; 7	CAR; 25	KAN; 34	CLT; 35	DOV; 15	TEX; 16	KEN; 33	IOW; 16	CHI; 13	POC; 10	MCH; 18	BRI; 3	ATL; 20	IOW; 11	KEN; 28	LVS; 25	TAL; 34	MAR; 23	TEX; 31		HOM; 10					
2012	Todd Peck	08	Chevy																					PHO; 18						
2014	Jimmy Weller III	08	Chevy	DAY; 9			CLT; 14	DOV; 30	TEX; 17		KEN; 22				MCH; 24	BRI; 19				LVS; 26	TAL; 30									
2014	Korbin Forrister	08	Chevy		MAR; 26					GTW; 21			ELD; 24											PHO; 15						
2014	Todd Shafer	08	Chevy			KAN; 26																								
2014	Chris Eggleston	08	Chevy									IOW; 19																		
2014	Ray Black Jr.	08	Chevy											POC; 28				CHI; 18	NHA; 21				TEX; 18		HOM; 28					
2014	B. J. McLeod	08	Chevy														MSP; 27													
2014	Camden Murphy	08	Chevy																			MAR; 21								
2015	Korbin Forrister	08	Chevy	DAY; 12	ATL; 20	MAR; 23	KAN; 22	CLT; 29	DOV; 17	TEX; 18	GTW; 22	IOW; 26	KEN; 21	ELD; 24	POC; 27	MCH; 22	BRI; 27	MSP; 18	CHI; 27	NHA; 29	LVS; 27	TAL; 15	MAR	TEX; 22	PHO; 30	HOM; 27				

=== Truck No. 21 history ===
In 2010, the team fielded the No. 21 with Steve Urvan as the owner. Donny Lia began the season in the ride, later moving to the No. 07 with Tony Jackson. The No. 21 would then be fielded as a 'start and park' truck with Johnny Chapman, Butch Miller and Chris Eggleston sharing the ride. Jake Crum made his NCWTS debut in the No. 21 at the Bristol Motor Speedway on August 18, 2010, during the O'Reilly 200. Crum qualified thirteenth and ran well early in the event, but fell victim to a broken fuel pump midway through the event. The truck was later taken over at the EnjoyIllinois.com 225 by David Starr who had left Randy Moss Motorsports the week prior due to lack of performance and the decision to have the No. 81 miss Chicago and Kentucky. Starr drove the No. 21 Chevrolet to a top-ten finish at Chicagoland.

==== Truck No. 21 results ====
Year	Driver	No.	Make	1	2	3	4	5	6	7	8	9	10	11	12	13	14	15	16	17	18	19	20	21	22	23	24	25	Owners	Pts
2010	Donny Lia	21	Dodge	DAY; 30																										
2010	Donny Lia	21	Chevy													POC; 22	NSH; 12													
2010	Butch Miller	21	Dodge		ATL; 32									GTY; DNQ	IRP; 18			DAR; 30												
2010	Chris Eggleston	21	Chevy			MAR; 11	NSH; 24	KAN; 30		CLT; 29																				
2010	Chris Eggleston	21	Dodge										IOW; 14																	
2010	Johnny Chapman	21	Dodge						DOV; 30		TEX; 27																			
2010	Chad McCumbee	21	Dodge									MCH; 30																		
2010	Jake Crum	21	Chevy																BRI; 31											
2010	David Starr	21	Chevy																	CHI; 10	KEN	NHA	LVS	MAR	TAL	TEX	PHO	HOM		

=== Truck No. 23 history ===
In 2010, Jason White drove the No. 23 full-time, and the team had their best season. White won the pole at Daytona and was in the top five in points for half of the season. However, the team's performance dropped and they took home a tenth place finish in points. White left the team for the upstart Joe Denette Motorsports for 2011.

==== Truck No. 23 results ====
Year	Driver	No.	Make	1	2	3	4	5	6	7	8	9	10	11	12	13	14	15	16	17	18	19	20	21	22	23	24	25	Owners	Pts
2010	Jason White	23	Ford	DAY; 4								MCH; 7									KEN; 4				TAL; 9			HOM; 23		
2010	Jason White	23	Dodge		ATL; 11	MAR; 29	NSH; 19	KAN; 11	DOV; 14	CLT; 8	TEX; 13		IOW; 23	GTY; 11	IRP; 13	POC; 10	NSH; 28	DAR; 27	BRI; 36				LVS; 14							
2010	Jason White	23	Chevy																	CHI; 11		NHA; 14								
2010	Jason White	23	Toyota																					MAR; 4		TEX; 11	PHO; 32			

=== Truck No. 45 history ===
Green Light Racing began competing in 2000 with Bobby Dotter driving the No. 45 People Against Drugs Chevrolet in two races, with a best finish seventeenth at The Milwaukee Mile.

==== Truck No. 45 results ====
Year	Driver	No.	Make	1	2	3	4	5	6	7	8	9	10	11	12	13	14	15	16	17	18	19	20	21	22	23	24	Owners	Pts
2000	Bobby Dotter	45	Chevy	DAY	HOM	PHO	MMR	MAR	PIR	GTY	MEM	PPR	EVG	TEX	KEN	GLN	MLW; 17	NHA	NZH	MCH	IRP	NSV; 31	CIC	RCH	DOV	TEX; DNQ	CAL		

=== Truck No. 78 history ===
In 2007, the team fielded the No. 78 truck for Johnny Chapman at Atlanta. He finished last.

==== Truck No. 78 results ====
Year	Driver	No.	Make	1	2	3	4	5	6	7	8	9	10	11	12	13	14	15	16	17	18	19	20	21	22	23	24	25	Owners	Pts
2007	Johnny Chapman	78	Chevy	DAY	CAL	ATL; 35	MAR	KAN	CLT	MFD	DOV	TEX	MCH	MLW	MEM	KEN	IRP	NSH	BRI	GTW	NHA	LVS	TAL	MAR	ATL	TEX	PHO	HOM		

=== Truck No. 81 history ===
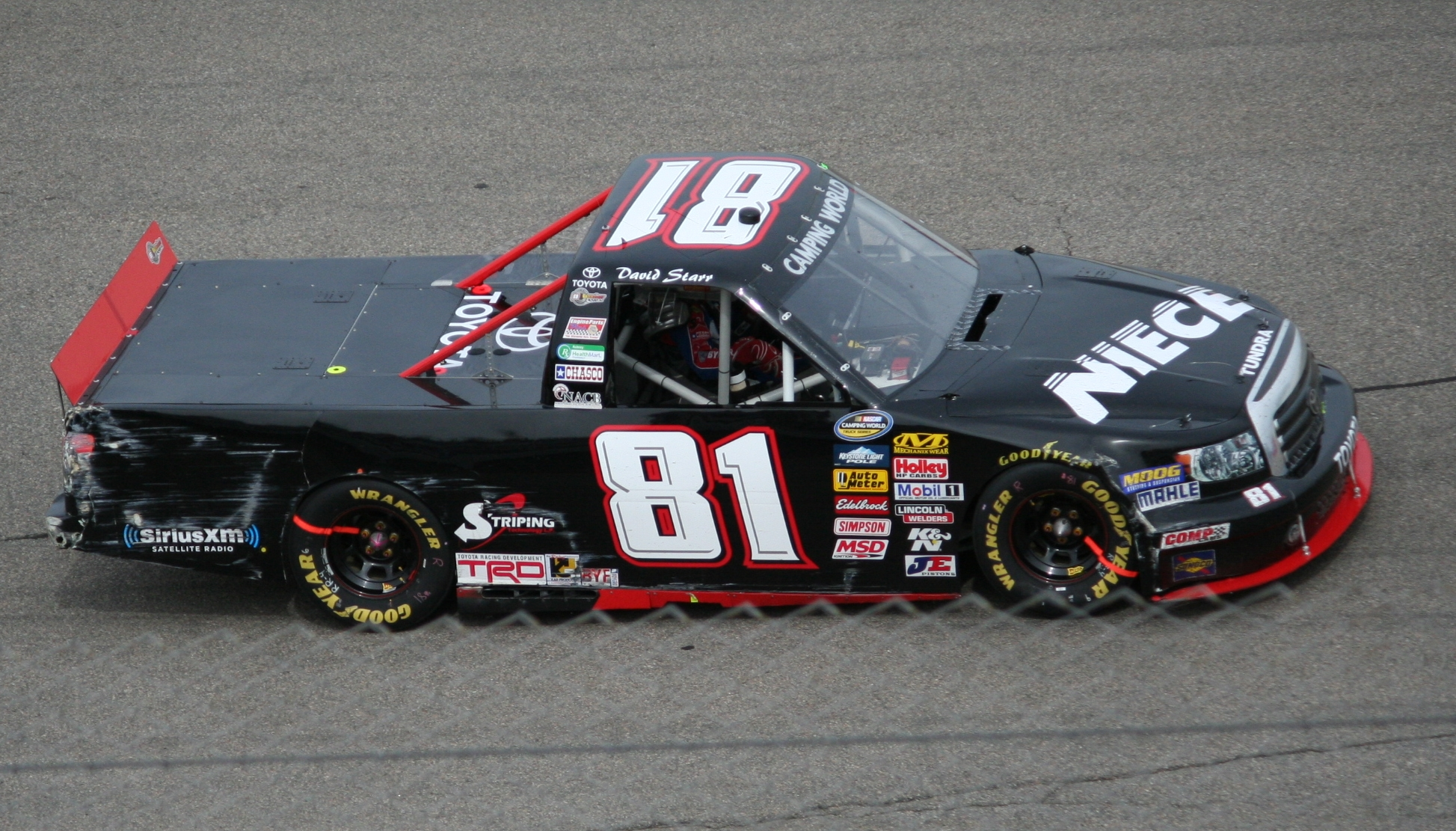
David Starr in the No. 81 in 2013

In 2010, the No. 81 and Zachry sponsorship were then moved over from Moss Motorsports to SS-Greenlight, and David Starr drove the truck for the rest of the season to a ninth place finish in points.

In 2011, Starr and the team struggled to keep up, scoring eight top-tens and finishing thirteenth in points. Starr then left to join Arrington Racing.

In 2013, the No. 81 returned to SS-Greenlight with Starr. However, he would only run the first seven races before sponsorship issues forced him to sit out most of the season.

==== Truck No. 81 results ====
Year	Driver	No.	Make	1	2	3	4	5	6	7	8	9	10	11	12	13	14	15	16	17	18	19	20	21	22	23	24	25	Owners	Pts
2010	David Starr	81	Toyota	DAY	ATL	MAR	NSH	KAN	DOV	CLT	TEX	MCH	IOW	GTY	IRP	POC	NSH	DAR	BRI	CHI	KEN; 14	NHA; 15	LVS; 12	MAR; 7	TAL; 11	TEX; 15	PHO; 8	HOM; 11		
2011	David Starr	81	Toyota	DAY; 13	PHO; 34	DAR; 10	MAR; 26	NSH; 8	DOV; 12	CLT; 28	KAN; 16	TEX; 30	KEN; 8	IOW; 9	NSH; 8	IRP; 3	POC; 18	MCH; 5	BRI; 11	ATL; 17	CHI; 19	NHA; 14	KEN; 10	LVS; 16	TAL; 30	MAR; 22	TEX; 23	HOM; 11		
2013	David Starr	81	Toyota	DAY; 31	MAR; 13	CAR; 20	KAN; 13	CLT; 23	DOV; 14	TEX; 17						BRI; 23					TAL; 2	MAR	TEX; 23	PHO; 23						
2013	C. J. Faison	81	Toyota								KEN; 19																			
2013	Jimmy Weller III	81	Toyota									IOW; 24													HOM; 17					
2013	Kenny Wallace	81	Toyota										ELD; 17						CHI; 20											
2013	Ricky Ehrgott	81	Toyota											POC; 36																
2013	Jake Crum	81	Chevy												MCH; 28															
2013	Derek White	81	Chevy														MSP; 21													
2013	Matt Kurzejewski	81	Chevy															IOW; 27		LVS; 24										

== ARCA Menards Series ==
=== Car No. 08 history ===
Before Patrick Emerling left his team on February 1, 2024, he had announced plans to enter the ARCA season-opener at Daytona driving the No. 53 car and had participated in the series' pre-season test session at the track in January. With a car having been prepared and an entry having been filed, Emerling attempted and made the race with SS-Greenlight in the No. 08 car.

==== Car No. 08 results ====
Year	Driver	No.	Make	1	2	3	4	5	6	7	8	9	10	11	12	13	14	15	16	17	18	19	20	Owners	Pts	Ref
2024	Patrick Emerling	08	Ford	DAY; 17	PHO	TAL	DOV	KAN	CLT	IOW	MOH	BLN	IRP	SLM	ELK	MCH	ISF	MLW	DSF	GLN	BRI	KAN	TOL	62nd	27	
