= 2026 BetRivers 200 =

NASCAR O'Reilly Auto Parts Series race at Dover Motor Speedway

Race details
- Race 14 of 33 in the 2026 NASCAR O'Reilly Auto Parts Series
- Date: May 16, 2026
- Location: Dover Motor Speedway in Dover, Delaware
- Course: Permanent racing facility
- Course length: 1 miles (1.6 km)
- Distance: 200 laps, 200 mi (321.869 km)
- Average speed: 99.917 miles per hour (160.801 km/h)

Pole position
Driver	Ross Chastain	JR Motorsports
- Time: 23.317

Most laps led
Driver	Justin Allgaier	JR Motorsports
- Laps: 71

Fastest lap
Driver	William Sawalich	Joe Gibbs Racing
- Time: 23.868

Winner
No. 17	Corey Day	Hendrick Motorsports

Television in the United States
- Network: The CW
- Announcers: Dillon Welch, Jamie McMurray, and Parker Kligerman

Radio in the United States
- Radio: PRN
- Booth announcers: Brad Gillie and Nick Yeoman
- Turn announcers: Pat Patterson (1 & 2) and Doug Turnbull (3 & 4)

The 2026 BetRivers 200 was a NASCAR O'Reilly Auto Parts Series race held on Saturday, May 16, 2026, at Dover Motor Speedway in Dover, Delaware. Contested over 200 laps on the 1-mile (1.6 km) concrete oval, it was the fourteenth race of the 2026 NASCAR O'Reilly Auto Parts Series season, and the 45th running of the event.

Corey Day, driving for Hendrick Motorsports, took advantage of a lap car and made a three-wide pass on Justin Allgaier with four laps to go, and led the remainder of the event to earn his second career NASCAR O'Reilly Auto Parts Series win, and his second of the season. Allgaier finished second after leading a race-high 71 laps, and Sam Mayer finished third. William Sawalich and Austin Hill rounded out the top five, while Brandon Jones, Carson Kvapil, Ryan Sieg, Sammy Smith, and Anthony Alfredo rounded out the top ten.

== Report ==
=== Background ===
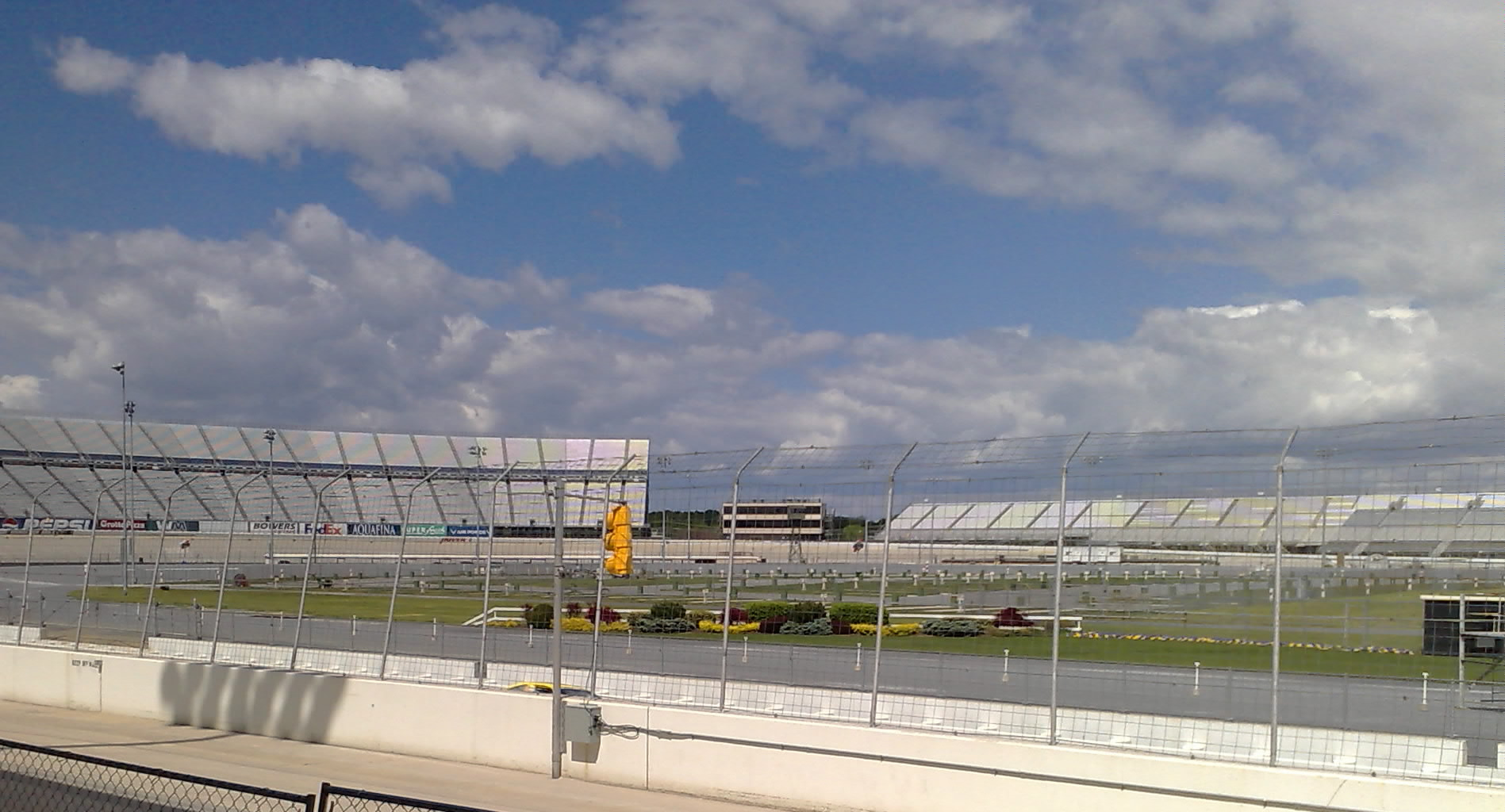
Dover Motor Speedway, the track where the race will be held.

Dover Motor Speedway is an oval race track in Dover, Delaware, United States that has held at least two NASCAR races since it opened in 1969. In addition to NASCAR, the track also hosted USAC and the NTT IndyCar Series. The track features one layout, a 1 mile (1.6 km) concrete oval, with 24° banking in the turns and 9° banking on the straights. The speedway is owned and operated by Speedway Motorsports.

The track, nicknamed "The Monster Mile", was built in 1969 by Melvin Joseph of Melvin L. Joseph Construction Company, Inc., with an asphalt surface, but was replaced with concrete in 1995. Six years later in 2001, the track's capacity moved to 135,000 seats, making the track have the largest capacity of sports venue in the mid-Atlantic. In 2002, the name changed to Dover International Speedway from Dover Downs International Speedway after Dover Downs Gaming and Entertainment split, making Dover Motorsports. From 2007 to 2009, the speedway worked on an improvement project called "The Monster Makeover", which expanded facilities at the track and beautified the track. After the 2014 season, the track's capacity was reduced to 95,500 seats.

==== Entry list ====
- (R) denotes rookie driver.
- (i) denotes driver who is ineligible for series driver points.

#	Driver	Team	Make
00	Sheldon Creed	Haas Factory Team	Chevrolet
0	Garrett Smithley	SS-Green Light Racing	Chevrolet
1	Carson Kvapil	JR Motorsports	Chevrolet
02	Ryan Ellis	Young's Motorsports	Chevrolet
2	Jesse Love	Richard Childress Racing	Chevrolet
07	Josh Bilicki	SS-Green Light Racing	Chevrolet
7	Justin Allgaier	JR Motorsports	Chevrolet
8	Sammy Smith	JR Motorsports	Chevrolet
9	Ross Chastain (i)	JR Motorsports	Chevrolet
17	Corey Day	Hendrick Motorsports	Chevrolet
18	William Sawalich	Joe Gibbs Racing	Toyota
19	Brent Crews (R)	Joe Gibbs Racing	Toyota
20	Brandon Jones	Joe Gibbs Racing	Toyota
21	Austin Hill	Richard Childress Racing	Chevrolet
24	Harrison Burton	Sam Hunt Racing	Toyota
26	Dean Thompson	Sam Hunt Racing	Toyota
27	Jeb Burton	Jordan Anderson Racing	Chevrolet
28	Kyle Sieg	RSS Racing	Chevrolet
31	Blaine Perkins	Jordan Anderson Racing	Chevrolet
32	Andrew Patterson	Jordan Anderson Racing	Chevrolet
35	Dawson Cram	Joey Gase Motorsports	Chevrolet
38	Logan Bearden	RSS Racing	Ford
39	Ryan Sieg	RSS Racing	Chevrolet
41	Sam Mayer	Haas Factory Team	Chevrolet
42	C. J. McLaughlin	Young's Motorsports	Chevrolet
44	Brennan Poole	Alpha Prime Racing	Chevrolet
45	Lavar Scott (R)	Alpha Prime Racing	Chevrolet
48	Patrick Staropoli (R)	Big Machine Racing	Chevrolet
51	Jeremy Clements	Jeremy Clements Racing	Chevrolet
53	David Starr	Joey Gase Motorsports	Chevrolet
54	Taylor Gray	Joe Gibbs Racing	Toyota
55	Blake Lothian	Joey Gase Motorsports	Toyota
87	Austin Green	Peterson Racing	Chevrolet
88	Rajah Caruth	JR Motorsports	Chevrolet
91	Myatt Snider	DGM Racing	Chevrolet
92	B. J. McLeod (i)	DGM Racing	Chevrolet
96	Anthony Alfredo	Viking Motorsports	Chevrolet
99	Parker Retzlaff	Viking Motorsports	Chevrolet
Official entry list

== Practice ==
The first and only practice session was held on Saturday, May 16, at 9:30 AM EST, lasted for 50 minutes.

Taylor Gray, driving for Joe Gibbs Racing, set the fastest time in the session, with a lap of 23.749 seconds, and a speed of 151.585 miles per hour (243.952 km/h).

=== Practice results ===
Pos	#	Driver	Team	Make	Time	Speed
1	54	Taylor Gray	Joe Gibbs Racing	Toyota	23.749	151.585
2	18	William Sawalich	Joe Gibbs Racing	Toyota	23.812	151.184
3	2	Jesse Love	Richard Childress Racing	Chevrolet	23.833	151.051
Full practice results

== Qualifying ==
Qualifying was held on Saturday, May 16, at 10:35 AM EST. Since Dover Motor Speedway is a mile oval, the qualifying procedure used was a single-car, two-lap system with one round. Drivers were on track by themselves and had two laps to post a qualifying time, and whoever set the fastest time won the pole.

Ross Chastain, driving for JR Motorsports, qualified on pole position with a lap of 23.317 seconds, and a speed of 154.394 miles per hour (248.473 km/h).

No drivers failed to qualify.

=== Qualifying results ===
Pos.	#	Driver	Team	Make	Time	Speed
1	9	Ross Chastain (i)	JR Motorsports	Chevrolet	23.317	154.394
2	20	Brandon Jones	Joe Gibbs Racing	Toyota	23.372	154.030
3	17	Corey Day	Hendrick Motorsports	Chevrolet	23.416	153.741
4	88	Rajah Caruth	JR Motorsports	Chevrolet	23.457	153.472
5	54	Taylor Gray	Joe Gibbs Racing	Toyota	23.472	153.374
6	41	Sam Mayer	Haas Factory Team	Chevrolet	23.487	153.276
7	1	Carson Kvapil	JR Motorsports	Chevrolet	23.550	152.866
8	18	William Sawalich	Joe Gibbs Racing	Toyota	23.575	152.704
9	24	Harrison Burton	Sam Hunt Racing	Toyota	23.600	152.542
10	2	Jesse Love	Richard Childress Racing	Chevrolet	23.645	152.252
11	39	Ryan Sieg	RSS Racing	Chevrolet	23.649	152.226
12	00	Sheldon Creed	Haas Factory Team	Chevrolet	23.681	152.021
13	7	Justin Allgaier	JR Motorsports	Chevrolet	23.720	151.771
14	99	Parker Retzlaff	Viking Motorsports	Chevrolet	23.720	151.771
15	27	Jeb Burton	Jordan Anderson Racing	Chevrolet	23.741	151.636
16	19	Brent Crews (R)	Joe Gibbs Racing	Toyota	23.779	151.394
17	21	Austin Hill	Richard Childress Racing	Chevrolet	23.810	151.197
18	8	Sammy Smith	JR Motorsports	Chevrolet	23.831	151.064
19	92	B. J. McLeod (i)	DGM Racing	Chevrolet	23.873	150.798
20	44	Brennan Poole	Alpha Prime Racing	Chevrolet	23.889	150.697
21	51	Jeremy Clements	Jeremy Clements Racing	Chevrolet	23.902	150.615
22	26	Dean Thompson	Sam Hunt Racing	Toyota	23.917	150.521
23	45	Lavar Scott (R)	Alpha Prime Racing	Chevrolet	23.925	150.470
24	28	Kyle Sieg	RSS Racing	Chevrolet	23.958	150.263
25	91	Myatt Snider	DGM Racing	Chevrolet	24.051	149.682
26	87	Austin Green	Peterson Racing	Chevrolet	24.082	149.489
27	96	Anthony Alfredo	Viking Motorsports	Chevrolet	24.149	149.074
28	48	Patrick Staropoli (R)	Big Machine Racing	Chevrolet	24.204	148.736
29	31	Blaine Perkins	Jordan Anderson Racing	Chevrolet	24.220	148.637
30	0	Garrett Smithley	SS-Green Light Racing	Chevrolet	24.277	148.289
31	32	Andrew Patterson	Jordan Anderson Racing	Chevrolet	24.298	148.160
32	02	Ryan Ellis	Young's Motorsports	Chevrolet	24.468	147.131
Qualified by owner's points
33	55	Blake Lothian	Joey Gase Motorsports	Toyota	24.538	146.711
34	07	Josh Bilicki	SS-Green Light Racing	Chevrolet	24.548	146.651
35	35	Dawson Cram	Joey Gase Motorsports	Chevrolet	24.666	145.950
36	38	Logan Bearden	RSS Racing	Ford	24.726	145.596
37	42	C. J. McLaughlin	Young's Motorsports	Chevrolet	24.937	144.364
38	53	David Starr	Joey Gase Motorsports	Chevrolet	—	—
Official qualifying results
Official starting lineup

== Race ==
=== Race results ===
==== Stage Results ====
Stage One Laps: 45

Pos.	#	Driver	Team	Make	Pts
1	20	Brandon Jones	Joe Gibbs Racing	Toyota	10
2	9	Ross Chastain (i)	JR Motorsports	Chevrolet	0
3	41	Sam Mayer	Haas Factory Team	Chevrolet	8
4	54	Taylor Gray	Joe Gibbs Racing	Toyota	7
5	88	Rajah Caruth	JR Motorsports	Chevrolet	6
6	1	Carson Kvapil	JR Motorsports	Chevrolet	5
7	18	William Sawalich	Joe Gibbs Racing	Toyota	4
8	17	Corey Day	Hendrick Motorsports	Chevrolet	3
9	2	Jesse Love	Richard Childress Racing	Chevrolet	2
10	7	Justin Allgaier	JR Motorsports	Chevrolet	1

Stage Two Laps: 45

Pos.	#	Driver	Team	Make	Pts
1	9	Ross Chastain (i)	JR Motorsports	Chevrolet	0
2	88	Rajah Caruth	JR Motorsports	Chevrolet	9
3	54	Taylor Gray	Joe Gibbs Racing	Toyota	8
4	2	Jesse Love	Richard Childress Racing	Chevrolet	7
5	41	Sam Mayer	Haas Factory Team	Chevrolet	6
6	1	Carson Kvapil	JR Motorsports	Chevrolet	5
7	17	Corey Day	Hendrick Motorsports	Chevrolet	4
8	7	Justin Allgaier	JR Motorsports	Chevrolet	3
9	18	William Sawalich	Joe Gibbs Racing	Toyota	2
10	39	Ryan Sieg	RSS Racing	Chevrolet	1

=== Final Stage results ===
Stage Three Laps: 110

Fin	St	#	Driver	Team	Make	Laps	Led	Status	Pts
1	3	17	Corey Day	Hendrick Motorsports	Chevrolet	200	4	Running	62
2	13	7	Justin Allgaier	JR Motorsports	Chevrolet	200	71	Running	39
3	6	41	Sam Mayer	Haas Factory Team	Chevrolet	200	1	Running	48
4	8	18	William Sawalich	Joe Gibbs Racing	Toyota	200	15	Running	40
5	17	21	Austin Hill	Richard Childress Racing	Chevrolet	200	0	Running	32
6	2	20	Brandon Jones	Joe Gibbs Racing	Toyota	200	31	Running	41
7	7	1	Carson Kvapil	JR Motorsports	Chevrolet	200	0	Running	40
8	11	39	Ryan Sieg	RSS Racing	Chevrolet	200	0	Running	30
9	18	8	Sammy Smith	JR Motorsports	Chevrolet	200	0	Running	28
10	27	96	Anthony Alfredo	Viking Motorsports	Chevrolet	200	0	Running	27
11	20	44	Brennan Poole	Alpha Prime Racing	Chevrolet	200	0	Running	26
12	26	87	Austin Green	Peterson Racing	Chevrolet	200	4	Running	25
13	1	9	Ross Chastain (i)	JR Motorsports	Chevrolet	200	68	Running	0
14	4	88	Rajah Caruth	JR Motorsports	Chevrolet	200	1	Running	38
15	21	51	Jeremy Clements	Jeremy Clements Racing	Chevrolet	200	0	Running	22
16	9	24	Harrison Burton	Sam Hunt Racing	Toyota	200	0	Running	21
17	24	28	Kyle Sieg	RSS Racing	Chevrolet	200	0	Running	20
18	12	00	Sheldon Creed	Haas Factory Team	Chevrolet	200	0	Running	19
19	31	32	Andrew Patterson	Jordan Anderson Racing	Chevrolet	200	0	Running	18
20	22	26	Dean Thompson	Sam Hunt Racing	Toyota	200	0	Running	17
21	28	48	Patrick Staropoli (R)	Big Machine Racing	Chevrolet	200	0	Running	16
22	16	19	Brent Crews (R)	Joe Gibbs Racing	Toyota	200	0	Running	15
23	10	2	Jesse Love	Richard Childress Racing	Chevrolet	200	4	Running	23
24	25	91	Myatt Snider	DGM Racing	Chevrolet	200	0	Running	13
25	32	02	Ryan Ellis	Young's Motorsports	Chevrolet	199	0	Running	12
26	33	55	Blake Lothian	Joey Gase Motorsports	Toyota	199	0	Running	11
27	34	07	Josh Bilicki	SS-Green Light Racing	Chevrolet	199	0	Running	10
28	35	35	Dawson Cram	Joey Gase Motorsports	Chevrolet	198	0	Running	9
29	19	92	B. J. McLeod (i)	DGM Racing	Chevrolet	195	0	Running	0
30	37	42	C. J. McLaughlin	Young's Motorsports	Chevrolet	193	0	Running	7
31	30	0	Garrett Smithley	SS-Green Light Racing	Chevrolet	189	0	Running	6
32	5	54	Taylor Gray	Joe Gibbs Racing	Toyota	183	1	Suspension	20
33	38	53	David Starr	Joey Gase Motorsports	Chevrolet	62	0	Vibration	4
34	29	31	Blaine Perkins	Jordan Anderson Racing	Chevrolet	59	0	Accident	3
35	36	38	Logan Bearden	RSS Racing	Ford	30	0	Brakes	2
36	23	45	Lavar Scott (R)	Alpha Prime Racing	Chevrolet	23	0	Engine	1
37	15	27	Jeb Burton	Jordan Anderson Racing	Chevrolet	10	0	Accident	1
38	14	99	Parker Retzlaff	Viking Motorsports	Chevrolet	10	0	Accident	1
Official race results

=== Race statistics ===
- Lead changes: 12 among 10 different drivers
- Cautions/Laps: 9 for 54 laps
- Red flags: 0
- Time of race: 2 hours, 14 minutes and 6 seconds
- Average speed: 99.917 miles per hour (160.801 km/h)

== Standings after the race ==
Drivers' Championship standings

	Pos	Driver	Points
	1	Justin Allgaier	679
	2	Sheldon Creed	504 (–175)
	3	Jesse Love	502 (–177)
1	4	Corey Day	484 (–195)
1	5	Brandon Jones	474 (–205)
	6	Sammy Smith	427 (–252)
	7	Austin Hill	424 (–255)
	8	Carson Kvapil	420 (–259)
3	9	Sam Mayer	369 (–310)
	10	Taylor Gray	365 (–314)
2	11	Parker Retzlaff	363 (–316)
1	12	William Sawalich	344 (–335)
Official driver's standings

Manufacturers' Championship standings

Pos	Manufacturer	Points
1	Chevrolet	729
2	Toyota	471 (–258)
3	Ford	184 (–545)

- Note: Only the first 12 positions are included for the driver standings.

Previous race: 2026 Mission 200 at The Glen	NASCAR O'Reilly Auto Parts Series; 2026 season	Next race: 2026 Charbroil 300
