= 2026 Charbroil 300 =

NASCAR O'Reilly Auto Parts Series race at Charlotte Motor Speedway

Race details
- Race 15 of 33 in the 2026 NASCAR O'Reilly Auto Parts Series
- Date: May 23, 2026
- Location: Charlotte Motor Speedway in Concord, North Carolina
- Course: Permanent racing facility
- Course length: 1.5 miles (2.4 km)
- Distance: 91 laps, 136.5 mi (219.675 km)
- Scheduled distance: 200 laps, 300 mi (482.803 km)
- Average speed: 159.480 miles per hour (256.658 km/h)

Pole position
Driver	Justin Allgaier	JR Motorsports
- Grid positions set by competition-based formula

Most laps led
Driver	Justin Allgaier	JR Motorsports
- Laps: 36

Fastest lap
Driver	Ross Chastain	JR Motorsports
- Time: 30.120

Winner
No. 9	Ross Chastain	JR Motorsports

Television in the United States
- Network: The CW
- Announcers: Adam Alexander, Jamie McMurray and Denny Hamlin

Radio in the United States
- Radio: PRN
- Booth announcers: Brad Gillie and Nick Yeoman
- Turn announcers: Andrew Kurland (1 & 2) and Pat Patterson (3 & 4)

The 2026 Charbroil 300 was a NASCAR O'Reilly Auto Parts Series race held on Saturday, May 23, 2026, at Charlotte Motor Speedway in Concord, North Carolina. Contested over 91 laps—decreased from 200 laps due to rain and heavy fog conditions on the 1.5-mile (2.4 km) asphalt speedway, it was the fifteenth race of the 2026 NASCAR O'Reilly Auto Parts Series season, and the 45th running of the event.

In a weather-filled race, including a 4-hour red flag for rain showers, Ross Chastain, driving for JR Motorsports, took the lead over Jesse Love on Lap 72. The next lap, Dawson Cram dropped oil on the circuit in Turn 1, with numerous cars sliding into the barrier, leading to race control calling the safety car. After cleanup, NASCAR gave teams the one lap to restart signal on Lap 85, and teams made the choose cone for lane choice. As the cars reached Turn 3, the mist and visibility became an issue again, with the restart attempt scrubbed, with the field in rows awaiting the restart. Following the end of Stage 2 on Lap 90, the cars were then sent to pit road, where NASCAR declared the race official for heavy mist and fog conditions. This was Chastain's third career NASCAR O'Reilly Auto Parts Series win, and his first of the season. Despite only running 37 green flag laps, pole-sitter Justin Allgaier led the race-high 36 laps, before hitting the wall and falling back to 29th due to an oil spill on the track from Dawson Cram. Love finished second, and Austin Hill finished third. William Sawalich and Corey Day rounded out the top five, while Connor Zilisch, Ryan Sieg, Cole Custer, Carson Kvapil, and Rajah Caruth rounded out the top ten.

== Report ==
=== Background ===
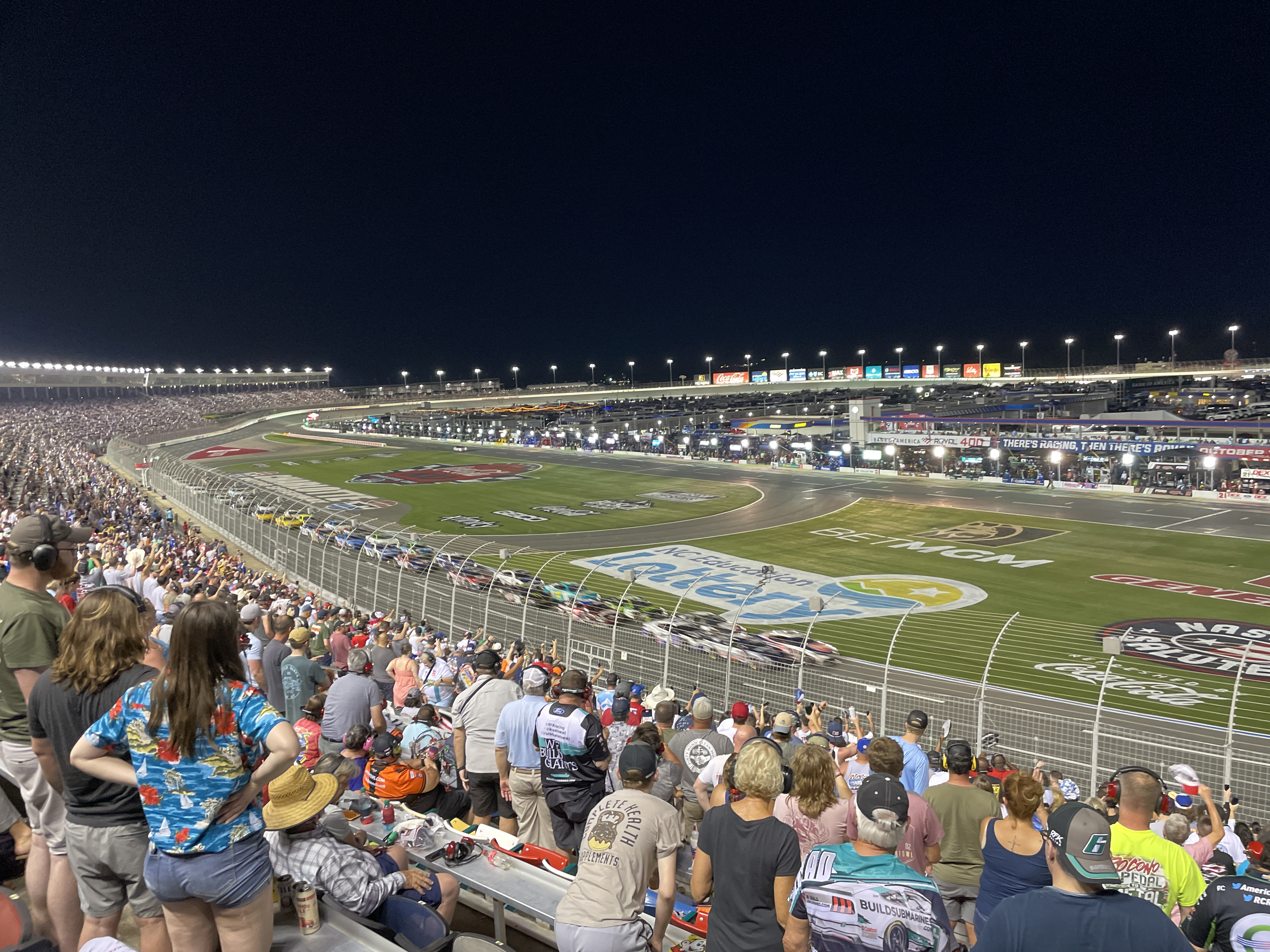
Charlotte Motor Speedway, the track where the race was held.

The race was held at Charlotte Motor Speedway, located in Concord, North Carolina. The speedway complex includes a 1.5-mile (2.4 km) quad-oval track that was utilized for the race, as well as a dragstrip and a dirt track. The speedway was built in 1959 by Bruton Smith and is considered the home track for NASCAR with many race teams based in the Charlotte metropolitan area. The track is owned and operated by Speedway Motorsports Inc. (SMI) with Marcus G. Smith serving as track president.

Charbroil was announced as the title sponsor on February 25.

==== Entry list ====
- (R) denotes rookie driver.
- (i) denotes driver who is ineligible for series driver points.

#	Driver	Team	Make
00	Sheldon Creed	Haas Factory Team	Chevrolet
0	Cole Custer (i)	SS-Green Light Racing	Chevrolet
1	Connor Zilisch (i)	JR Motorsports	Chevrolet
02	Ryan Ellis	Young's Motorsports	Chevrolet
2	Jesse Love	Richard Childress Racing	Chevrolet
07	Josh Bilicki	SS-Green Light Racing	Chevrolet
7	Justin Allgaier	JR Motorsports	Chevrolet
8	Sammy Smith	JR Motorsports	Chevrolet
9	Ross Chastain (i)	JR Motorsports	Chevrolet
17	Corey Day	Hendrick Motorsports	Chevrolet
18	William Sawalich	Joe Gibbs Racing	Toyota
19	Brent Crews (R)	Joe Gibbs Racing	Toyota
20	Brandon Jones	Joe Gibbs Racing	Toyota
21	Austin Hill	Richard Childress Racing	Chevrolet
24	Harrison Burton	Sam Hunt Racing	Toyota
26	Dean Thompson	Sam Hunt Racing	Toyota
27	Jeb Burton	Jordan Anderson Racing	Chevrolet
28	Kyle Sieg	RSS Racing	Chevrolet
31	Blaine Perkins	Jordan Anderson Racing	Chevrolet
32	Andrew Patterson	Jordan Anderson Racing	Chevrolet
35	Dawson Cram	Joey Gase Motorsports	Chevrolet
38	J. J. Yeley	RSS Racing	Ford
39	Ryan Sieg	RSS Racing	Chevrolet
41	Sam Mayer	Haas Factory Team	Chevrolet
42	Nathan Byrd	Young's Motorsports	Chevrolet
44	Brennan Poole	Alpha Prime Racing	Chevrolet
45	Lavar Scott (R)	Alpha Prime Racing	Chevrolet
48	Patrick Staropoli (R)	Big Machine Racing	Chevrolet
51	Jeremy Clements	Jeremy Clements Racing	Chevrolet
53	David Starr	Joey Gase Motorsports	Chevrolet
54	Taylor Gray	Joe Gibbs Racing	Toyota
55	Joey Gase	Joey Gase Motorsports	Chevrolet
87	Austin Green	Peterson Racing	Chevrolet
88	Rajah Caruth	JR Motorsports	Chevrolet
91	Carson Kvapil	DGM Racing	Chevrolet
92	Leland Honeyman (i)	DGM Racing	Chevrolet
96	Anthony Alfredo	Viking Motorsports	Chevrolet
99	Parker Retzlaff	Viking Motorsports	Chevrolet
Official entry list

== Starting lineup ==
Practice and qualifying were originally scheduled to be held on Saturday, May 23, at 11:00 AM and 12:05 PM EST, but was cancelled due to inclement weather. Justin Allgaier, driving for JR Motorsports, was awarded the pole position as a result of NASCAR's pandemic formula with a score of 1.700.

No drivers failed to qualify.

=== Starting lineup ===
Pos.	#	Driver	Team	Make
1	7	Justin Allgaier	JR Motorsports	Chevrolet
2	17	Corey Day	Hendrick Motorsports	Chevrolet
3	41	Sam Mayer	Haas Factory Team	Chevrolet
4	20	Brandon Jones	Joe Gibbs Racing	Toyota
5	1	Connor Zilisch (i)	JR Motorsports	Chevrolet
6	21	Austin Hill	Richard Childress Racing	Chevrolet
7	18	William Sawalich	Joe Gibbs Racing	Toyota
8	8	Sammy Smith	JR Motorsports	Chevrolet
9	39	Ryan Sieg	RSS Racing	Chevrolet
10	88	Rajah Caruth	JR Motorsports	Chevrolet
11	44	Brennan Poole	Alpha Prime Racing	Chevrolet
12	00	Sheldon Creed	Haas Factory Team	Chevrolet
13	96	Anthony Alfredo	Viking Motorsports	Chevrolet
14	9	Ross Chastain (i)	JR Motorsports	Chevrolet
15	51	Jeremy Clements	Jeremy Clements Racing	Chevrolet
16	87	Austin Green	Peterson Racing	Chevrolet
17	2	Jesse Love	Richard Childress Racing	Chevrolet
18	19	Brent Crews (R)	Joe Gibbs Racing	Toyota
19	24	Harrison Burton	Sam Hunt Racing	Toyota
20	32	Andrew Patterson	Jordan Anderson Racing	Chevrolet
21	26	Dean Thompson	Sam Hunt Racing	Toyota
22	28	Kyle Sieg	RSS Racing	Chevrolet
23	48	Patrick Staropoli (R)	Big Machine Racing	Chevrolet
24	91	Carson Kvapil	DGM Racing	Chevrolet
25	54	Taylor Gray	Joe Gibbs Racing	Toyota
26	07	Josh Bilicki	SS-Green Light Racing	Chevrolet
27	02	Ryan Ellis	Young's Motorsports	Chevrolet
28	55	Joey Gase	Joey Gase Motorsports	Chevrolet
29	0	Cole Custer (i)	SS-Green Light Racing	Chevrolet
30	92	Leland Honeyman (i)	DGM Racing	Chevrolet
31	99	Parker Retzlaff	Viking Motorsports	Chevrolet
32	42	Nathan Byrd	Young's Motorsports	Chevrolet
Qualified by owner's points
33	31	Blaine Perkins	Jordan Anderson Racing	Chevrolet
34	35	Dawson Cram	Joey Gase Motorsports	Chevrolet
35	27	Jeb Burton	Jordan Anderson Racing	Chevrolet
36	53	David Starr	Joey Gase Motorsports	Chevrolet
37	45	Lavar Scott (R)	Alpha Prime Racing	Chevrolet
38	38	J. J. Yeley	RSS Racing	Ford
Official starting lineup

== Race ==
=== Race results ===
==== Stage Results ====
Stage One Laps: 45

Pos.	#	Driver	Team	Make	Pts
1	1	Connor Zilisch (i)	JR Motorsports	Chevrolet	0
2	7	Justin Allgaier	JR Motorsports	Chevrolet	9
3	9	Ross Chastain (i)	JR Motorsports	Chevrolet	0
4	17	Corey Day	Hendrick Motorsports	Chevrolet	7
5	41	Sam Mayer	Haas Factory Team	Chevrolet	6
6	2	Jesse Love	Richard Childress Racing	Chevrolet	5
7	20	Brandon Jones	Joe Gibbs Racing	Toyota	4
8	88	Rajah Caruth	JR Motorsports	Chevrolet	3
9	19	Brent Crews (R)	Joe Gibbs Racing	Toyota	2
10	00	Sheldon Creed	Haas Factory Team	Chevrolet	1

Stage Two Laps: 45

Pos.	#	Driver	Team	Make	Pts
1	9	Ross Chastain (i)	JR Motorsports	Chevrolet	0
2	2	Jesse Love	Richard Childress Racing	Chevrolet	9
3	21	Austin Hill	Richard Childress Racing	Chevrolet	8
4	18	William Sawalich	Joe Gibbs Racing	Toyota	7
5	17	Corey Day	Hendrick Motorsports	Chevrolet	6
6	1	Connor Zilisch (i)	JR Motorsports	Chevrolet	0
7	39	Ryan Sieg	RSS Racing	Chevrolet	4
8	0	Cole Custer (i)	SS-Green Light Racing	Chevrolet	0
9	91	Carson Kvapil	DGM Racing	Chevrolet	2
10	88	Rajah Caruth	JR Motorsports	Chevrolet	1

=== Final Stage Results ===
Stage Three Laps: 1

Fin	St	#	Driver	Team	Make	Laps	Led	Status	Pts
1	14	9	Ross Chastain (i)	JR Motorsports	Chevrolet	91	28	Running	0
2	17	2	Jesse Love	Richard Childress Racing	Chevrolet	91	4	Running	49
3	6	21	Austin Hill	Richard Childress Racing	Chevrolet	91	1	Running	42
4	7	18	William Sawalich	Joe Gibbs Racing	Toyota	91	0	Running	40
5	2	17	Corey Day	Hendrick Motorsports	Chevrolet	91	0	Running	45
6	5	1	Connor Zilisch (i)	JR Motorsports	Chevrolet	91	7	Running	0
7	9	39	Ryan Sieg	RSS Racing	Chevrolet	91	0	Running	34
8	29	0	Cole Custer (i)	SS-Green Light Racing	Chevrolet	91	0	Running	0
9	24	91	Carson Kvapil	DGM Racing	Chevrolet	91	0	Running	30
10	10	88	Rajah Caruth	JR Motorsports	Chevrolet	91	0	Running	31
11	8	8	Sammy Smith	JR Motorsports	Chevrolet	91	0	Running	26
12	31	99	Parker Retzlaff	Viking Motorsports	Chevrolet	91	0	Running	25
13	13	96	Anthony Alfredo	Viking Motorsports	Chevrolet	91	0	Running	24
14	21	26	Dean Thompson	Sam Hunt Racing	Toyota	91	0	Running	23
15	30	92	Leland Honeyman (i)	DGM Racing	Chevrolet	91	0	Running	0
16	16	87	Austin Green	Peterson Racing	Chevrolet	91	0	Running	21
17	37	45	Lavar Scott (R)	Alpha Prime Racing	Chevrolet	91	0	Running	20
18	23	48	Patrick Staropoli (R)	Big Machine Racing	Chevrolet	91	0	Running	19
19	22	28	Kyle Sieg	RSS Racing	Chevrolet	91	0	Running	18
20	36	53	David Starr	Joey Gase Motorsports	Chevrolet	91	0	Running	17
21	27	02	Ryan Ellis	Young's Motorsports	Chevrolet	91	0	Running	16
22	35	27	Jeb Burton	Jordan Anderson Racing	Chevrolet	91	0	Running	15
23	28	55	Joey Gase	Joey Gase Motorsports	Chevrolet	91	0	Running	14
24	33	31	Blaine Perkins	Jordan Anderson Racing	Chevrolet	91	3	Running	13
25	26	07	Josh Bilicki	SS-Green Light Racing	Chevrolet	91	0	Running	12
26	32	42	Nathan Byrd	Young's Motorsports	Chevrolet	91	0	Running	11
27	11	44	Brennan Poole	Alpha Prime Racing	Chevrolet	91	0	Running	10
28	20	32	Andrew Patterson	Jordan Anderson Racing	Chevrolet	91	0	Running	9
29	1	7	Justin Allgaier	JR Motorsports	Chevrolet	91	36	Running	17
30	15	51	Jeremy Clements	Jeremy Clements Racing	Chevrolet	90	0	Running	7
31	25	54	Taylor Gray	Joe Gibbs Racing	Toyota	73	0	Accident	6
32	12	00	Sheldon Creed	Haas Factory Team	Chevrolet	73	0	Accident	6
33	34	35	Dawson Cram	Joey Gase Motorsports	Chevrolet	72	0	Engine	4
34	38	38	J. J. Yeley	RSS Racing	Ford	64	0	Fuel Pump	3
35	4	20	Brandon Jones	Joe Gibbs Racing	Toyota	62	0	Running	6
36	3	41	Sam Mayer	Haas Factory Team	Chevrolet	61	12	Accident	7
37	18	19	Brent Crews (R)	Joe Gibbs Racing	Toyota	51	0	Accident	3
38	19	24	Harrison Burton	Sam Hunt Racing	Toyota	51	0	Accident	1
Official race results

=== Race statistics ===
- Lead changes: 14 among 7 different drivers
- Cautions/Laps: 6 for 54 laps
- Red flags: 1
- Time of race: 1 hour, 52 minutes and 52 seconds
- Average speed: 159.480 miles per hour (256.658 km/h)

== Standings after the race ==
Drivers' Championship standings

	Pos	Driver	Points
	1	Justin Allgaier	696
1	2	Jesse Love	551 (–145)
1	3	Corey Day	529 (–167)
2	4	Sheldon Creed	510 (–186)
	5	Brandon Jones	480 (–216)
1	6	Austin Hill	466 (–230)
1	7	Sammy Smith	453 (–243)
	8	Carson Kvapil	450 (–246)
2	9	Parker Retzlaff	388 (–308)
2	10	William Sawalich	384 (–312)
2	11	Sam Mayer	376 (–320)
2	12	Taylor Gray	371 (–325)
Official driver's standings

Manufacturers' Championship standings

Pos	Manufacturer	Points
1	Chevrolet	784
2	Toyota	504 (–280)
3	Ford	187 (–597)

- Note: Only the first 12 positions are included for the driver standings.

Previous race: 2026 BetRivers 200	NASCAR O'Reilly Auto Parts Series; 2026 season	Next race: 2026 Sports Illustrated Resorts 250
