= Corey Day =

American racing driver (2005)

- Day at Las Vegas Motor Speedway in 2026
- Born: Corey Eric Day; November 28, 2005 (age 20); Clovis, California, U.S.
- Achievements: 2023 King of the West Sprint Car Series Champion; 2023, 2024 Trophy Cup Champion; 2024 Turkey Night Grand Prix Winner; 2017 Tulsa Shootout Restricted A-Class Winner; 2023–2025 Gold Cup Sprint Car Champion

NASCAR O'Reilly Auto Parts Series career
- 44 races run over 2 years
- Car no., team: No. 17 (Hendrick Motorsports)
- 2026 position: 5th
- Best finish: 5th (2026)
- First race: 2025 US Marine Corps 250 (Martinsville)
- Last race: 2026 O'Reilly Auto Parts 300 (Homestead)
- First win: 2026 Ag-Pro 300 (Talladega)
- Last win: 2026 Blue Cross NC 300 (Charlotte)
Wins	Top tens	Poles
4	24	2

NASCAR FedEx Freight Truck Series career
- 14 races run over 3 years
- 2026 position: 121st
- Best finish: 40th (2024)
- First race: 2024 UNOH 200 (Bristol)
- Last race: 2026 North Carolina Education Lottery 200 (Charlotte)
Wins	Top tens	Poles
0	3	1

ARCA Menards Series career
- 6 races run over 2 years
- Best finish: 41st (2024)
- First race: 2024 Salem ARCA 200 (Salem)
- Last race: 2025 Reese's 150 (Kansas)
Wins	Top tens	Poles
0	3	0

ARCA Menards Series East career
- 1 race run over 1 year
- Best finish: 43th (2024)
- First race: 2024 Bush's Beans 200 (Bristol)
Wins	Top tens	Poles
0	1	0

ARCA Menards Series West career
- 2 races run over 1 year
- Best finish: 32nd (2025)
- First race: 2025 General Tire 150 (Phoenix)
- Last race: 2025 General Tire 200 (Sonoma)
Wins	Top tens	Poles
0	2	0
- Statistics up to date as of November 7, 2026.

Corey Eric Day (born November 28, 2005) is an American professional dirt track and stock car racing driver. He competes full-time in the NASCAR O'Reilly Auto Parts Series, driving the No. 17 Chevrolet Camaro SS for Hendrick Motorsports. He has previously competed in the NASCAR Craftsman Truck Series, the ARCA Menards Series, the ARCA Menards Series East, and the ARCA Menards Series West.

== Racing career ==
=== Early career ===
Growing up in a racing family, Day began riding dirt bikes at a young age. At the age nine, he broke his arm after racing dirt bikes competitively, which ended his career in dirt bike racing. After years of going through the ranks, he decided to try a hand in sprint car racing with the help of his family, including his father, Ronnie Day, who was a West Coast racing legend.

=== Sprint car racing ===
Day began driving sprint cars in 2016, racing in the USAC Restricted Micro Sprints for his family-owned team. He ran eleven races with a best finish of 3rd at Keller Auto Raceway. He continued to have great success with sprint cars over the years, earning numerous victories in that time span. In 2021, he earned his first career USAC National Midget Series win at Circle City Raceway, becoming the youngest driver to win a USAC National Series event. In 2023, he won the NARC King of the West Sprint Car Series and the Make-A-Wish Trophy Cup championships.

On December 8, it was announced that Day would run full-time in the High Limit Racing in 2024, driving the No. 14 for Jason Meyers Racing. Throughout the season, he scored wins at RPM Speedway, Red Dirt Raceway, Riverside International Speedway, I-70 Motorsports Park, and Lake Ozark Speedway. He finished fifth in points.

=== Late models ===
On April 27, 2024, it was announced that Day would make his debut in late model racing, driving the No. 88 Chevrolet for JR Motorsports at Hickory Motor Speedway. After finishing seventh in the first feature event, he started on the outside pole for the final feature. He would end up leading nearly every lap to win the race in his second career start.

=== ARCA Menards Series ===
On July 24, 2024, it was announced that Day would run three races in the ARCA Menards Series for Pinnacle Racing Group with sponsorship from HendrickCars.com., which includes Salem, Bristol, and Kansas. In his debut at Salem, he started fifth and finished fifteenth after being involved in a late-race incident with Toni Breidinger. At Kansas, Day was involved in controversy after pushing Andy Jankowiak into the wall on the final lap. Both drivers were battling inside the top five, and after the contact, Jankowiak fell back and finished seventh, while Day came across in fourth. Following the race, Jankowiak confronted Day in the garage area.

On January 9, 2025, it was announced that Day would run four races for Spire Motorsports in the upcoming season, driving the No. 77 car beginning in the season-opener at Daytona.

=== NASCAR Craftsman Truck Series ===
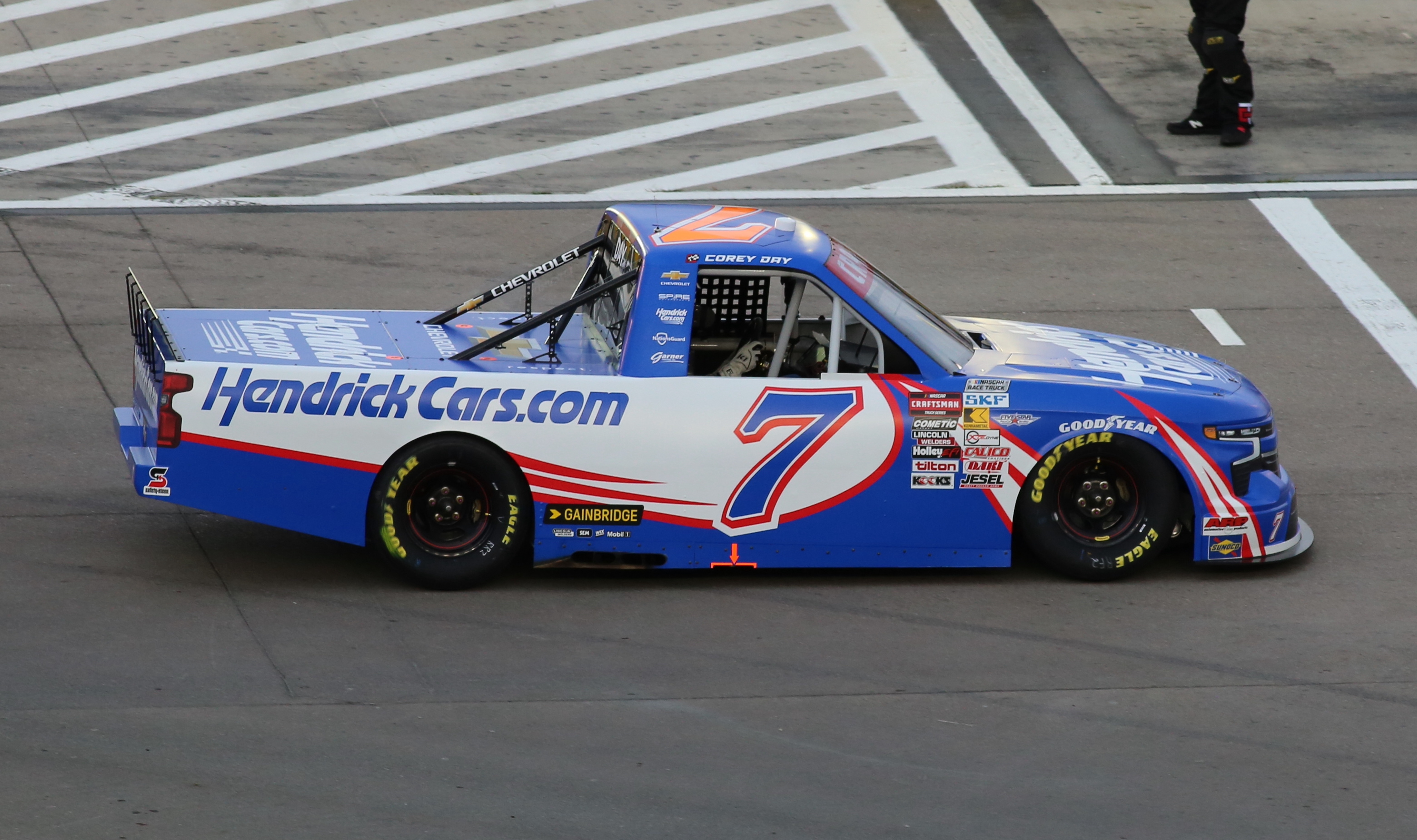
Day's No. 7 truck at Las Vegas Motor Speedway in 2025

On September 16, 2024, it was announced that Day would make his NASCAR Craftsman Truck Series debut at Bristol Motor Speedway for McAnally–Hilgemann Racing, driving the No. 81 truck. Day started 22nd and finished eighteenth in his debut. He ran three more races at Kansas, Homestead, and Martinsville during the season, earning his best finish of sixteenth at Homestead.

On January 9, 2025, it was announced that Day would increase his Truck Series schedule for the upcoming season, running eight races for Spire Motorsports in the No. 7 truck.

After it was announced that Kyle Busch was ill, it was announced that Day would fill in for Busch at Charlotte for Spire in the No. 7. He qualified on pole after the session was rained out and his day ended early after a near-flip on the backstretch.

=== NASCAR O'Reilly Auto Parts Series ===
==== 2025 ====
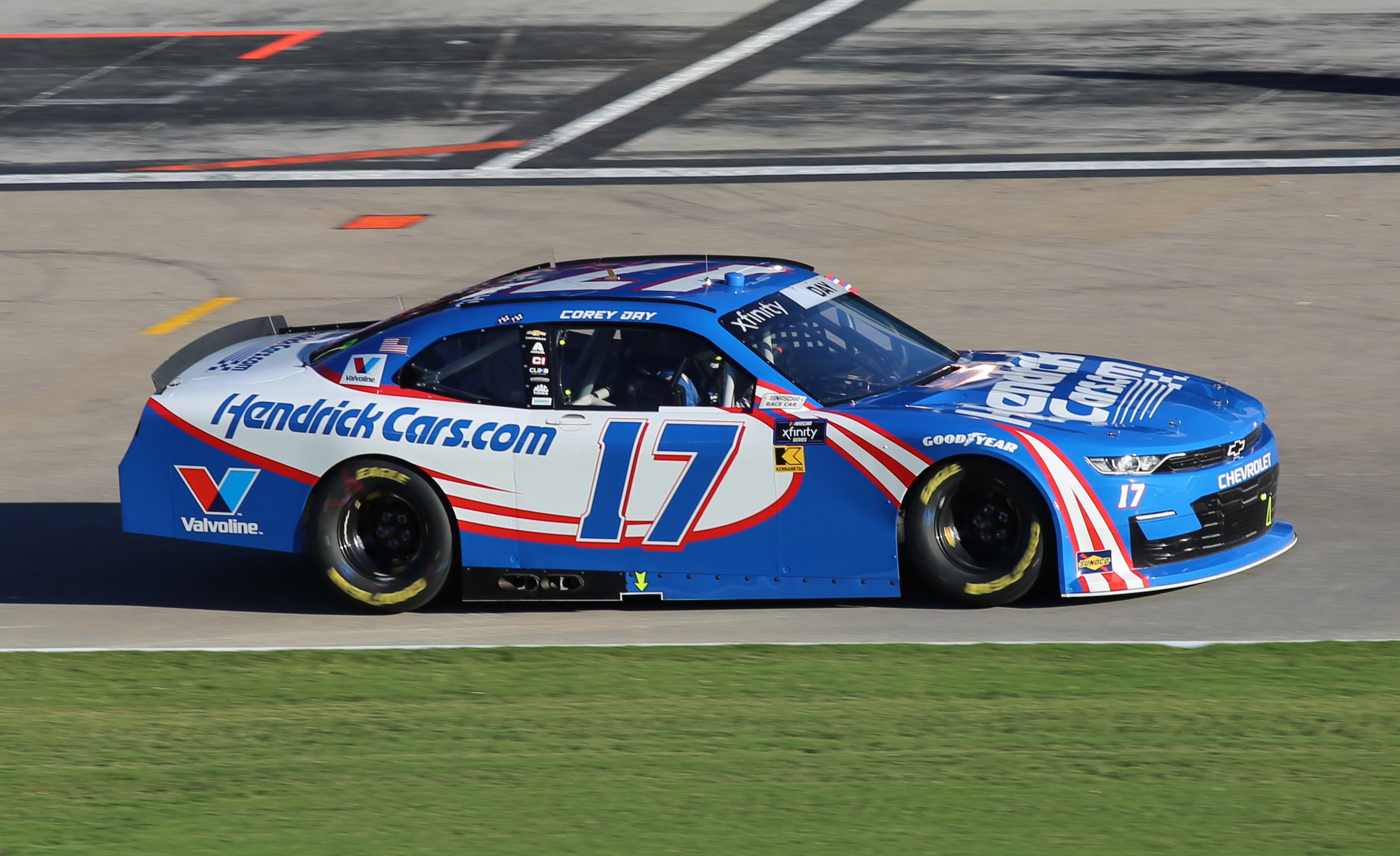
Day's No. 17 car at Las Vegas Motor Speedway in 2025

On December 6, 2024, Day signed a multi-year contract with Hendrick Motorsports. In 2025, he would run eleven races in the Xfinity Series for HMS in their No. 17 car.

==== 2026 ====
Day's No. 17 car at Las Vegas Motor Speedway in 2026

On November 7, 2025, it was announced that Day will run full-time for HMS in the now renamed O'Reilly Auto Parts Series for the 2026 season. He started the season with a 27th place DNF at Daytona. After a streak of eight consecutive top ten finishes, he scored his first career win at Talladega. He scored his second career win at Dover. During "The Chase", Day won from pole position at Las Vegas and at Charlotte.

==== 2027 ====
On August 18, 2026, it was announced that Day will return to HMS for the 2027 season.

=== NASCAR Cup Series ===
On September 10, 2026, Hendrick Motorsports announced that Day will run select Cup Series races in the 2027 season as part of a long-term extension with the team. On September 12, it was confirmed by Hendrick's Jeff Andrews that his Cup Series ride will be with Spire Motorsports.

== Motorsports career results ==
=== Stock car career summary ===
Season	Series	Team	Races	Wins	Top 5	Top 10	Points	Position
2024	ARCA Menards Series	Pinnacle Racing Group	3	0	1	2	106	41st
2024	ARCA Menards Series East	Pinnacle Racing Group	1	0	0	1	37	43rd
2024	NASCAR Craftsman Truck Series	McAnally–Hilgemann Racing	4	0	0	0	64	40th
2025	ARCA Menards Series	Spire Motorsports	3	0	0	1	78	56th
2025	ARCA Menards Series West	Spire Motorsports	2	0	0	2	71	32nd
2025	NASCAR Craftsman Truck Series	Spire Motorsports	9	0	2	3	0	NC†
2025	NASCAR Xfinity Series	Hendrick Motorsports	11	0	1	2	238	32nd
2026	NASCAR Craftsman Truck Series	Spire Motorsports	1	0	0	0	0	NC†
2026	NASCAR O'Reilly Auto Parts Series	Hendrick Motorsports	33	4	12	22	2416	5th

^{†} As Day was a guest driver, he was ineligible for championship points.

=== NASCAR ===
(key) (Bold – Pole position awarded by qualifying time. Italics – Pole position earned by points standings or practice time. * – Most laps led.)

==== Cup Series ====
NASCAR Cup Series results
Year	Team	No.	Make	1	2	3	4	5	6	7	8	9	10	11	12	13	14	15	16	17	18	19	20	21	22	23	24	25	26	27	28	29	30	31	32	33	34	35	36	NCSC	Pts	Ref
2027	Spire Motorsports	TBA	Chevy	DAY	ATL	COA	PHO	LVS	DAR	BRI	MAR	TAL	TEX	KAN	DOV	CLT	NSS	POC	MCH	CHI	IOW	SON	ATL	IND	COR	BRI	GTW	DAY	DAR	RCH	GLN	NHA	KAN	LVS	CLT	PHO	TAL	MAR	HOM	-*	-*	

==== O'Reilly Auto Parts Series ====
NASCAR O'Reilly Auto Parts Series results
Year	Team	No.	Make	1	2	3	4	5	6	7	8	9	10	11	12	13	14	15	16	17	18	19	20	21	22	23	24	25	26	27	28	29	30	31	32	33	NOAPSC	Pts	Ref
2025	Hendrick Motorsports	17	Chevy	DAY	ATL	COA	PHO	LVS	HOM	MAR; 21	DAR	BRI	CAR	TAL	TEX; 16	CLT	NSH; 11	MXC	POC	ATL	CSC	SON; 24	DOV	IND	IOW; 24	GLN	DAY	PIR	GTW; 9	BRI; 17	KAN	ROV; 22	LVS; 4	TAL	MAR; 13	PHO; 14	32nd	238	
2026	Hendrick Motorsports	17	Chevy	DAY; 27	ATL; 4	COA; 5	PHO; 9	LVS; 8	DAR; 6	MAR; 2	**CAR**; 10*	BRI; 8	KAN; 12	TAL; 1	TEX; 37	GLN; 15	DOV; 1	CLT; 5	NSH; 6	POC; 38	COR; 10	SON; 7	CHI; 19	ATL; 32	IND; 7	IOW; 36	DAY; 29	DAR; 2	GTW; 33	BRI; 5	**LVS**; 1*	CLT; 1	PHO; 4	TAL; 6	MAR; 3	HOM; 34	5th	2416	
2027	Hendrick Motorsports	17	Chevy	DAY	ATL	COA	PHO	LVS	DAR	BRI	MAR	TAL	TEX	DOV	NWS	CLT	NSS	POC	CHI	IOW	SON	IND	COR	BRI	GTW	DAY	DAR	RCH	GLN	KAN	LVS	CLT	PHO	TAL	MAR	HOM			

==== Craftsman Truck Series ====
NASCAR Craftsman Truck Series results
Year	Team	No.	Make	1	2	3	4	5	6	7	8	9	10	11	12	13	14	15	16	17	18	19	20	21	22	23	24	25	NCTC	Pts	Ref
2024	McAnally–Hilgemann Racing	81	Chevy	DAY	ATL	LVS	BRI	COA	MAR	TEX	KAN	DAR	NWS	CLT	GTW	NSH	POC	IRP	RCH	MLW	BRI; 18				MAR; 18	PHO			40th	64	
2024	McAnally–Hilgemann Racing	91	Chevy																			KAN; 32	TAL	HOM; 16					40th	64	
2025	Spire Motorsports	7	Chevy	DAY	ATL	**LVS**; 27	HOM; 15	MAR; 32	BRI; 15	CAR; 22	TEX	KAN	NWS	CLT	NSH; 5	MCH	POC	LRP	IRP; 2	GLN	RCH	DAR; 9	BRI; 11	NHA	ROV	TAL	MAR	PHO	81st	0^{1}	
2026	Spire Motorsports	7	Chevy	DAY	ATL	STP	DAR	CAR	BRI	TEX	GLN	DOV	CLT; 35	NSH	MCH	COR	LRP	NWS	IRP	RCH	NHA	BRI	KAN	CLT	PHO	TAL	MAR	HOM	121st	0^{1}	

^{*} Season still in progress
^{1} Ineligible for series points

=== ARCA Menards Series ===
(key) (Bold – Pole position awarded by qualifying time. Italics – Pole position earned by points standings or practice time. * – Most laps led. ** – All laps led.)

ARCA Menards Series results
Year	Team	No.	Make	1	2	3	4	5	6	7	8	9	10	11	12	13	14	15	16	17	18	19	20	AMSC	Pts	Ref
2024	Pinnacle Racing Group	28	Chevy	DAY	PHO	TAL	DOV	KAN	CLT	IOW	MOH	BLN	IRP	SLM; 15	ELK	MCH	ISF	MLW	DSF	GLN				41st	106	
2024	Pinnacle Racing Group	82	Chevy																		BRI; 7	KAN; 4	TOL	41st	106	
2025	Spire Motorsports	77	Chevy	DAY; 22	PHO; 10	TAL	KAN	CLT	MCH	BLN	ELK	LRP	DOV	IRP	IOW	GLN	ISF	MAD	DSF	BRI	SLM	KAN; 23	TOL	56th	78	

==== ARCA Menards Series East ====
ARCA Menards Series East results
Year	Team	No.	Make	1	2	3	4	5	6	7	8	AMSEC	Pts	Ref
2024	Pinnacle Racing Group	82	Chevy	FIF	DOV	NSV	FRS	IOW	IRP	MLW	BRI; 7	43th	37	

==== ARCA Menards Series West ====
ARCA Menards Series West results
Year	Team	No.	Make	1	2	3	4	5	6	7	8	9	10	11	12	AMSWC	Pts	Ref
2025	Spire Motorsports	77	Chevy	KER	PHO; 10	TUC	CNS	KER								32nd	71	
2025	Spire Motorsports	7	Chevy						SON; 7	TRI	PIR	AAS	MAD	LVS	PHO	32nd	71	
