= 2026 North Carolina Education Lottery 200 =

NASCAR Craftsman Truck Series race at Charlotte Motor Speedway

Race details
- Race 10 of 25 in the 2026 NASCAR Craftsman Truck Series
- Date: May 24, 2026
- Location: Charlotte Motor Speedway in Concord, North Carolina
- Course: Permanent racing facility
- Course length: 1.5 miles (2.4 km)
- Distance: 110 laps, 165 mi (265.542 km)
- Scheduled distance: 134 laps, 201 mi (323.478 km)
- Average speed: 83.993 miles per hour (135.174 km/h)

Pole position
Driver	Corey Day	Spire Motorsports
- Grid positions set by competition-based formula

Most laps led
Driver	Layne Riggs	Front Row Motorsports
- Laps: 52

Fastest lap
Driver	Christian Eckes	McAnally–Hilgemann Racing
- Time: 30.369

Winner
No. 34	Layne Riggs	Front Row Motorsports

Television in the United States
- Network: FS1
- Announcers: Eric Brennan, Michael Waltrip, and Regan Smith

Radio in the United States
- Radio: NRN
- Booth announcers: Brad Gillie and Nick Yeoman
- Turn announcers: Andrew Kurland (1 & 2) and Pat Patterson (3 & 4)

The 2026 North Carolina Education Lottery 200 was a NASCAR Craftsman Truck Series race held on Sunday, May 24, 2026, postponed from Friday, May 22, and again on Saturday, May 23, due to rain, at Charlotte Motor Speedway in Concord, North Carolina. Contested over 110 laps—decreased from 134 laps due to time constraints with the upcoming Indianapolis 500 on the 1.5-mile (2.4 km) asphalt speedway, it was the tenth race of the 2026 NASCAR Craftsman Truck Series season, and the 24th running of the event.

In a wreck-filled race which resulted in a series record of cautions for the Truck Series at Charlotte, Layne Riggs, driving for Front Row Motorsports, dominated the majority of the event, winning the second stage and leading a race-high 52 laps, holding off a charging Kaden Honeycutt until the final caution to earn his 7th career NASCAR Craftsman Truck Series win, and his second of the season. Honeycutt finished second, and Connor Zilisch finished third. Ben Rhodes and Gio Ruggiero rounded out the top five, while Christian Eckes, Brandon Jones, Tanner Gray, Ricky Stenhouse Jr., and William Sawalich rounded out the top ten.

== Report ==
=== Background ===
Charlotte Motor Speedway, the track where the race was officially held.

The race will be held at Charlotte Motor Speedway, located in Concord, North Carolina. The speedway complex includes a 1.5-mile (2.4 km) quad-oval track that was utilized for the race, as well as a dragstrip and a dirt track. The speedway was built in 1959 by Bruton Smith and is considered the home track for NASCAR with many race teams based in the Charlotte metropolitan area. The track is owned and operated by Speedway Motorsports Inc. (SMI) with Marcus Smith serving as track president.

Kyle Busch had originally intended to run in the race with Spire Motorsports in the No. 7 truck, but withdrew from the race on May 21, 2026 after being hospitalized with Corey Day substituting. He would later die the same day from illness.

==== Entry list ====
- (R) denotes rookie driver.
- (i) denotes driver who is ineligible for series driver points.

#	Driver	Team	Make
1	Brandon Jones (i)	Tricon Garage	Toyota
2	Luke Baldwin	Team Reaume	Ford
4	Ricky Stenhouse Jr. (i)	Niece Motorsports	Chevrolet
5	William Sawalich (i)	Tricon Garage	Toyota
7 (Note: previously scheduled to be Kyle Busch)	Corey Day (i)	Spire Motorsports	Chevrolet
9	Grant Enfinger	CR7 Motorsports	Chevrolet
10	Corey LaJoie	Kaulig Racing	Ram
11	Kaden Honeycutt	Tricon Garage	Toyota
12	Brenden Queen (R)	Kaulig Racing	Ram
13	Cole Butcher (R)	ThorSport Racing	Ford
14	Mini Tyrrell (R)	Kaulig Racing	Ram
15	Tanner Gray	Tricon Garage	Toyota
16	Justin Haley	Kaulig Racing	Ram
17	Gio Ruggiero	Tricon Garage	Toyota
18	Tyler Ankrum	McAnally–Hilgemann Racing	Chevrolet
19	Daniel Hemric	McAnally–Hilgemann Racing	Chevrolet
22	Josh Reaume	Team Reaume	Ford
25	Travis Pastrana	Kaulig Racing	Ram
26	Dawson Sutton	Rackley W.A.R.	Chevrolet
27	Toni Breidinger	Rackley W.A.R.	Chevrolet
33	Frankie Muniz	Team Reaume	Ford
34	Layne Riggs	Front Row Motorsports	Ford
38	Chandler Smith	Front Row Motorsports	Ford
42	Conner Jones	Niece Motorsports	Chevrolet
44	Andrés Pérez de Lara	Niece Motorsports	Chevrolet
45	Ross Chastain (i)	Niece Motorsports	Chevrolet
52	Stewart Friesen	Halmar Friesen Racing	Toyota
56	Timmy Hill	Hill Motorsports	Toyota
62	Leland Honeyman	Halmar Friesen Racing	Toyota
71	Shane van Gisbergen (i)	Spire Motorsports	Chevrolet
76	Spencer Boyd	Freedom Racing Enterprises	Chevrolet
77	Connor Zilisch (i)	Spire Motorsports	Chevrolet
81	Kris Wright	McAnally–Hilgemann Racing	Chevrolet
88	Ty Majeski	ThorSport Racing	Ford
91	Christian Eckes	McAnally–Hilgemann Racing	Chevrolet
93	Caleb Costner	Costner Motorsports	Chevrolet
98	Jake Garcia	ThorSport Racing	Ford
99	Ben Rhodes	ThorSport Racing	Ford
Official entry list

== Starting lineup ==
Practice and qualifying were originally scheduled to be held on Friday, May 22, at 3:30 PM and 4:35 PM EST, but were both cancelled due to inclement weather. Corey Day, driving for Spire Motorsports as a relief driver for the late Kyle Busch, was awarded the pole position as a result of NASCAR's pandemic formula with a score of 1.000.

Caleb Costner was the only driver who failed to qualify.

=== Starting lineup ===
Pos.	#	Driver	Team	Make
1	7	Corey Day (i)	Spire Motorsports	Chevrolet
2	34	Layne Riggs	Front Row Motorsports	Ford
3	11	Kaden Honeycutt	Tricon Garage	Toyota
4	88	Ty Majeski	ThorSport Racing	Ford
5	1	Brandon Jones (i)	Tricon Garage	Toyota
6	62	Leland Honeyman	Halmar Friesen Racing	Toyota
7	91	Christian Eckes	McAnally–Hilgemann Racing	Chevrolet
8	38	Chandler Smith	Front Row Motorsports	Ford
9	98	Jake Garcia	ThorSport Racing	Ford
10	10	Corey LaJoie	Kaulig Racing	Ram
11	52	Stewart Friesen	Halmar Friesen Racing	Toyota
12	16	Justin Haley	Kaulig Racing	Ram
13	5	William Sawalich (i)	Tricon Garage	Toyota
14	45	Ross Chastain (i)	Niece Motorsports	Chevrolet
15	12	Brenden Queen (R)	Kaulig Racing	Ram
16	17	Gio Ruggiero	Tricon Garage	Toyota
17	99	Ben Rhodes	ThorSport Racing	Ford
18	9	Grant Enfinger	CR7 Motorsports	Chevrolet
19	15	Tanner Gray	Tricon Garage	Toyota
20	81	Kris Wright	McAnally–Hilgemann Racing	Chevrolet
21	18	Tyler Ankrum	McAnally–Hilgemann Racing	Chevrolet
22	42	Conner Jones	Niece Motorsports	Chevrolet
23	26	Dawson Sutton	Rackley W.A.R.	Chevrolet
24	77	Connor Zilisch (i)	Spire Motorsports	Chevrolet
25	76	Spencer Boyd	Freedom Racing Enterprises	Chevrolet
26	33	Frankie Muniz	Team Reaume	Ford
27	44	Andrés Pérez de Lara	Niece Motorsports	Chevrolet
28	19	Daniel Hemric	McAnally–Hilgemann Racing	Chevrolet
29	25	Travis Pastrana	Kaulig Racing	Ram
30	14	Mini Tyrrell (R)	Kaulig Racing	Ram
31	13	Cole Butcher (R)	ThorSport Racing	Ford
Qualified by owner's points
32	2	Luke Baldwin	Team Reaume	Ford
33	22	Josh Reaume	Team Reaume	Ford
34	4	Ricky Stenhouse Jr. (i)	Niece Motorsports	Chevrolet
35	71	Shane van Gisbergen (i)	Spire Motorsports	Chevrolet
36	56	Timmy Hill	Hill Motorsports	Toyota
Failed to qualify
37	93	Caleb Costner	Costner Motorsports	Chevrolet
Official starting lineup

== Race ==
=== Race results ===
==== Stage results ====
Stage One Laps: 30

Pos.	#	Driver	Team	Make	Pts
1	91	Christian Eckes	McAnally–Hilgemann Racing	Chevrolet	10
2	1	Brandon Jones (i)	Tricon Garage	Toyota	0
3	34	Layne Riggs	Front Row Motorsports	Chevrolet	8
4	9	Grant Enfinger	CR7 Motorsports	Chevrolet	7
5	11	Kaden Honeycutt	Tricon Garage	Toyota	6
6	5	William Sawalich (i)	Tricon Garage	Toyota	0
7	7	Corey Day (i)	Spire Motorsports	Chevrolet	0
8	4	Ricky Stenhouse Jr. (i)	Niece Motorsports	Chevrolet	0
9	98	Jake Garcia	ThorSport Racing	Ford	2
10	26	Dawson Sutton	Rackley W.A.R.	Chevrolet	1

Stage Two Laps: 30

Pos.	#	Driver	Team	Make	Pts
1	34	Layne Riggs	Front Row Motorsports	Chevrolet	10
2	91	Christian Eckes	McAnally–Hilgemann Racing	Chevrolet	9
3	45	Ross Chastain (i)	Niece Motorsports	Chevrolet	0
4	19	Daniel Hemric	McAnally–Hilgemann Racing	Chevrolet	7
5	1	Brandon Jones (i)	Tricon Garage	Toyota	0
6	11	Kaden Honeycutt	Tricon Garage	Toyota	5
7	52	Stewart Friesen	Halmar Friesen Racing	Toyota	4
8	99	Ben Rhodes	ThorSport Racing	Ford	3
9	98	Jake Garcia	ThorSport Racing	Ford	2
10	18	Tyler Ankrum	McAnally–Hilgemann Racing	Chevrolet	1

=== Final Stage results ===
Stage Three Laps: 50

Fin	St	#	Driver	Team	Make	Laps	Led	Status	Pts
1	2	34	Layne Riggs	Front Row Motorsports	Ford	110	52	Running	73
2	3	11	Kaden Honeycutt	Tricon Garage	Toyota	110	0	Running	46
3	24	77	Connor Zilisch (i)	Spire Motorsports	Chevrolet	110	1	Running	0
4	17	99	Ben Rhodes	ThorSport Racing	Ford	110	0	Running	36
5	16	17	Gio Ruggiero	Tricon Garage	Toyota	110	12	Running	32
6	7	91	Christian Eckes	McAnally–Hilgemann Racing	Chevrolet	110	33	Running	51
7	5	1	Brandon Jones (i)	Tricon Garage	Toyota	110	1	Running	0
8	19	15	Tanner Gray	Tricon Garage	Toyota	110	0	Running	29
9	34	4	Ricky Stenhouse Jr. (i)	Niece Motorsports	Chevrolet	110	0	Running	0
10	13	5	William Sawalich (i)	Tricon Garage	Toyota	110	0	Running	0
11	28	19	Daniel Hemric	McAnally–Hilgemann Racing	Chevrolet	110	0	Running	33
12	10	10	Corey LaJoie	Kaulig Racing	Ram	110	0	Running	25
13	9	98	Jake Garcia	ThorSport Racing	Ford	110	0	Running	28
14	22	42	Conner Jones	Niece Motorsports	Chevrolet	110	0	Running	23
15	35	71	Shane van Gisbergen (i)	Spire Motorsports	Chevrolet	110	0	Running	0
16	18	9	Grant Enfinger	CR7 Motorsports	Chevrolet	110	4	Running	28
17	12	16	Justin Haley	Kaulig Racing	Ram	110	3	Running	20
18	36	56	Timmy Hill	Hill Motorsports	Toyota	110	0	Running	19
19	27	44	Andrés Pérez de Lara	Niece Motorsports	Chevrolet	110	0	Running	18
20	21	18	Tyler Ankrum	McAnally–Hilgemann Racing	Chevrolet	110	3	Running	18
21	29	25	Travis Pastrana	Kaulig Racing	Ram	110	0	Running	16
22	23	26	Dawson Sutton	Rackley W.A.R.	Chevrolet	110	0	Running	16
23	6	62	Leland Honeyman	Halmar Friesen Racing	Toyota	110	0	Running	14
24	26	33	Frankie Muniz	Team Reaume	Ford	110	0	Running	13
25	25	76	Spencer Boyd	Freedom Racing Enterprises	Chevrolet	110	0	Running	12
26	11	52	Stewart Friesen	Halmar Friesen Racing	Toyota	110	0	Running	15
27	31	13	Cole Butcher (R)	ThorSport Racing	Ford	110	0	Running	10
28	33	22	Josh Reaume	Team Reaume	Ford	109	0	Running	9
29	14	45	Ross Chastain (i)	Niece Motorsports	Chevrolet	107	0	Running	0
30	8	38	Chandler Smith	Front Row Motorsports	Ford	106	0	Running	7
31	20	81	Kris Wright	McAnally–Hilgemann Racing	Chevrolet	87	0	Accident	6
32	15	12	Brenden Queen (R)	Kaulig Racing	Ram	87	0	Accident	5
33	4	88	Ty Majeski	ThorSport Racing	Ford	51	0	Running	4
34	30	14	Mini Tyrrell (R)	Kaulig Racing	Ram	47	0	Accident	3
35	1	7	Corey Day (i)	Spire Motorsports	Chevrolet	46	1	Accident	0
36	32	2	Luke Baldwin	Team Reaume	Ford	37	0	Engine	1
Official race results

=== Race statistics ===
- Lead changes: 18 among 9 different drivers
- Cautions/Laps: 11 for 53 laps
- Red flags: 0
- Time of race: 1 hour, 57 minutes and 52 seconds
- Average speed: 83.993 miles per hour (135.174 km/h)

== Standings after the race ==
Drivers' Championship standings

	Pos	Driver	Points
	1	Kaden Honeycutt	393
	2	Layne Riggs	382 (–11)
3	3	Christian Eckes	322 (–71)
	4	Gio Ruggiero	318 (–75)
2	5	Chandler Smith	315 (–78)
1	6	Ben Rhodes	282 (–111)
2	7	Ty Majeski	281 (–112)
	8	Jake Garcia	241 (–152)
3	9	Daniel Hemric	229 (–164)
	10	Tyler Ankrum	224 (–169)
Official driver's standings

Manufacturers' Championship standings

Pos	Manufacturer	Points
1	Toyota	423
2	Chevrolet	399 (–24)
3	Ford	391 (–32)
4	Ram	279 (–144)

- Note: Only the first 10 positions are included for the driver standings.

== Notes ==
Previous race: 2026 Ecosave 200	NASCAR Craftsman Truck Series; 2026 season	Next race: 2026 Allegiance 200
