= Brandon Jones (racing driver) =

American racing driver (born 1997)

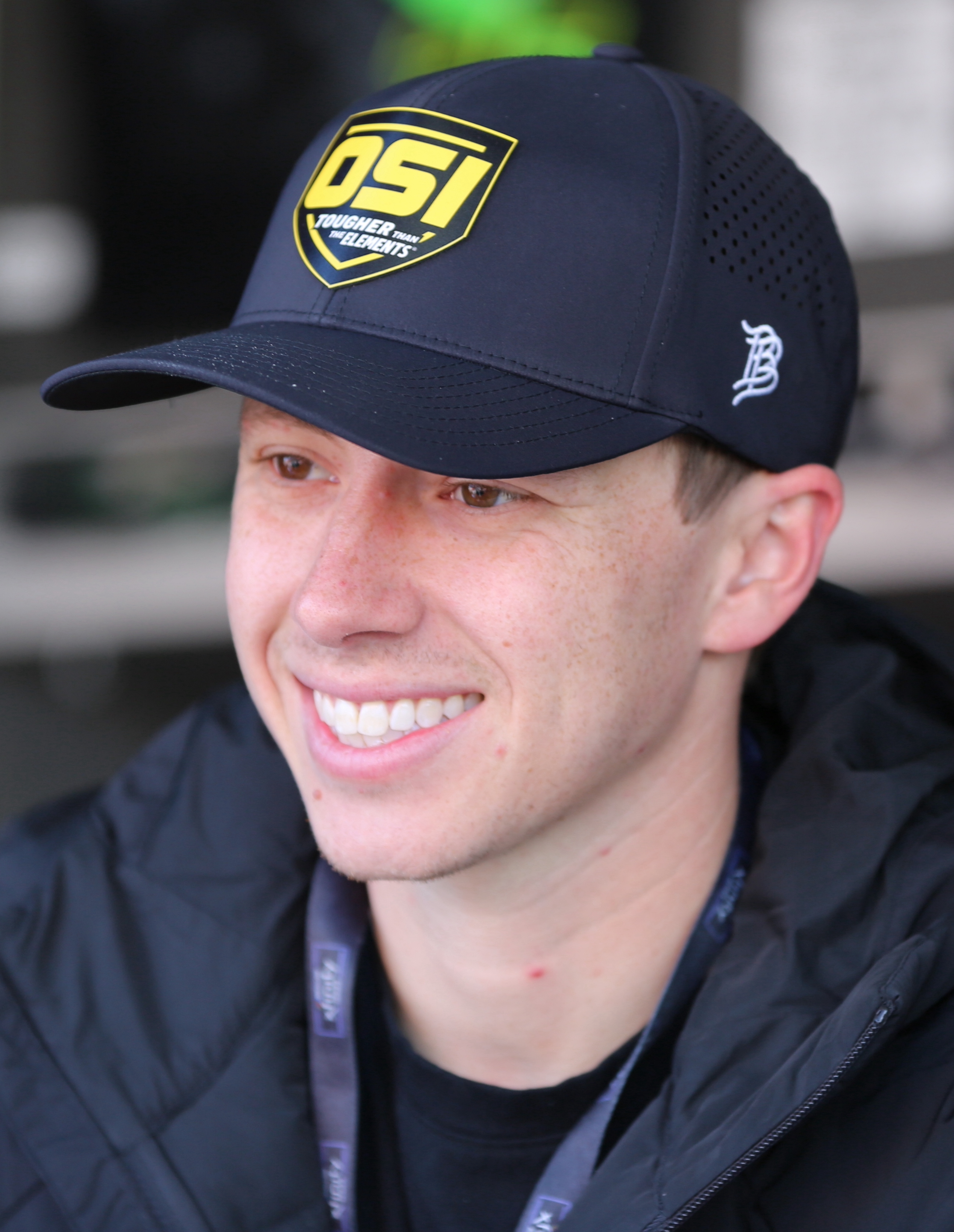
- Jones at Las Vegas Motor Speedway in 2025
- Born: Brandon Alexander Jones; February 18, 1997 (age 29); Atlanta, Georgia, U.S.

NASCAR O'Reilly Auto Parts Series career
- 368 races run over 12 years
- Car no., team: No. 20 (Joe Gibbs Racing)
- 2026 position: 8th
- Best finish: 5th (2025)
- First race: 2015 3M 250 (Iowa)
- Last race: 2026 O'Reilly Auto Parts 300 (Homestead)
- First win: 2019 Kansas Lottery 300 (Kansas)
- Last win: 2026 O'Reilly Auto Parts 300 (Homestead)
Wins	Top tens	Poles
9	152	15

NASCAR FedEx Freight Truck Series career
- 60 races run over 10 years
- 2026 position: 103rd
- Best finish: 15th (2015)
- First race: 2013 UNOH 200 (Bristol)
- Last race: 2026 Allegiance 200 (Nashville)
- First win: 2020 Pocono Organics 150 (Pocono)
Wins	Top tens	Poles
1	30	0

ARCA Menards Series career
- 31 races run over 8 years
- Best finish: 15th (2015)
- First race: 2014 Herr's Chase the Taste 200 (Winchester)
- Last race: 2024 General Tire 100 at The Glen (Watkins Glen)
- First win: 2014 Herr's Chase the Taste 200 (Winchester)
- Last win: 2022 General Tire Delivers 100 (Watkins Glen)
Wins	Top tens	Poles
8	25	5

ARCA Menards Series East career
- 29 races run over 7 years
- Best finish: 4th (2014)
- First race: 2012 Kevin Whitaker Chevrolet 140 (Greenville-Pickens)
- Last race: 2022 Bush's Beans 200 (Bristol)
- First win: 2014 Autolite Iridium XP 150 (Iowa)
- Last win: 2022 Calypso Lemonade 150 (Iowa)
Wins	Top tens	Poles
2	16	0

ARCA Menards Series West career
- 3 races run over 2 years
- Best finish: 27th (2024)
- First race: 2013 Casino Arizona 50 (Phoenix)
- Last race: 2024 General Tire 200 (Sonoma)
Wins	Top tens	Poles
0	2	1
- Statistics up to date as of November 7, 2026.

Brandon Alexander Jones (born February 18, 1997) is an American professional stock car racing driver. He competes full-time in the NASCAR O'Reilly Auto Parts Series, driving the No. 20 Toyota GR Supra for Joe Gibbs Racing. He also competed in the NASCAR Craftsman Truck Series, the ARCA Menards Series, ARCA Menards Series East, and ARCA Menards Series West in the past.

Jones was formerly a development driver for the now-defunct Eddie Sharp Racing, Turner Scott Motorsports, and GMS Racing teams, as well as Richard Childress Racing, and Joe Gibbs Racing.

== Racing career ==
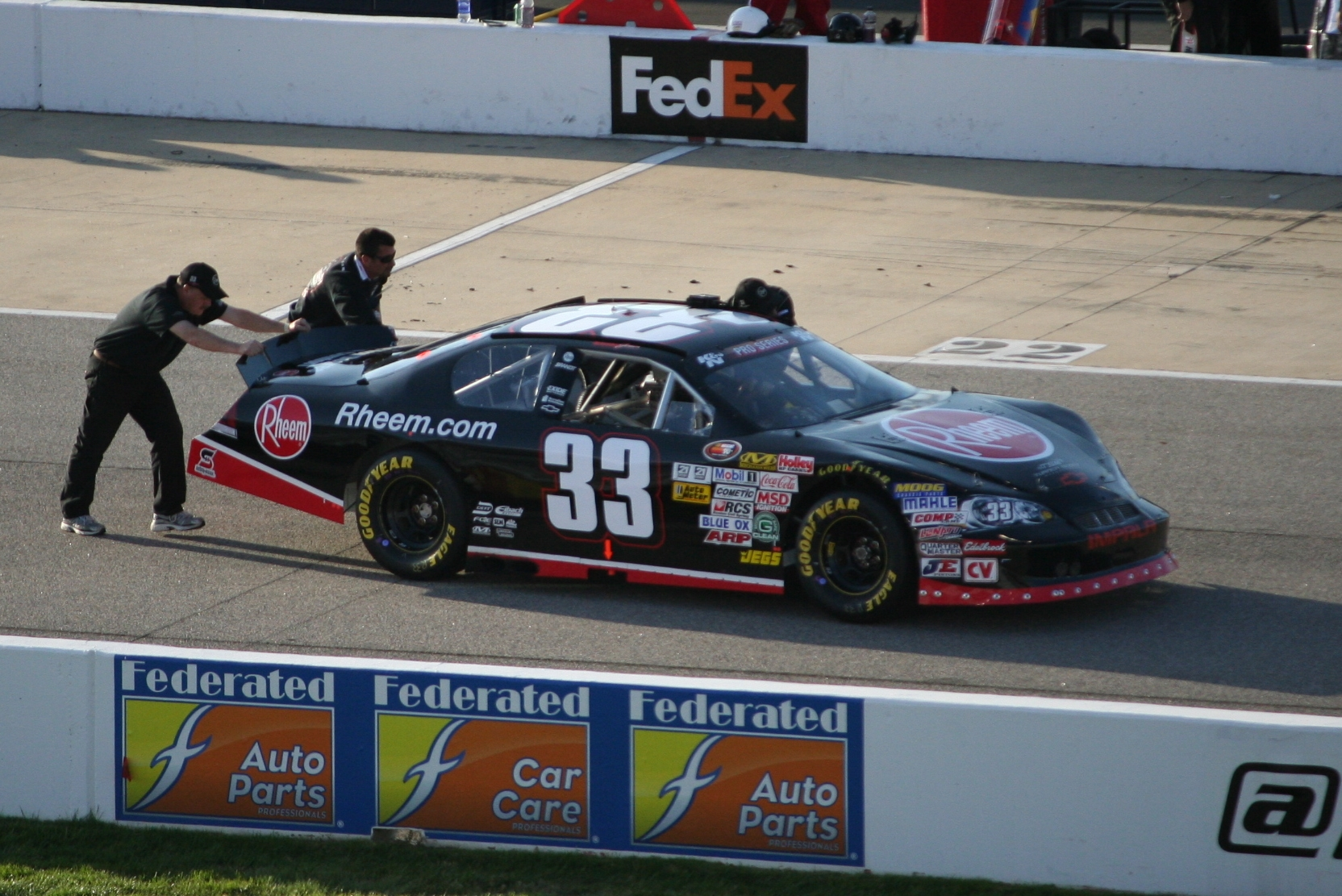
Jones at Richmond International Raceway in 2013.

=== Beginnings ===
Jones began racing in 2010 at the age of 13, under the supervision of short track racer Bubba Gale and his son former KHI development driver Cale Gale. Jones would race full-time in 2011 in the pro truck divisions at Lanier Raceplex and Gresham Motorsports Park in Georgia, winning track points championships at both facilities. Jones raced in late models for Eddie Sharp Racing in 2012, competing in the Pro All Stars Series (PASS) and United Auto Racing Association (UARA) series. Jones would make his debut in the NASCAR K&N Pro Series East later that year at Greenville-Pickens Speedway, finishing fourteenth in the No. 33 Rheem Chevrolet after wrecking on the last lap while running in fifth place. In 2013, at the age of fifteen, Jones signed a contract to drive for Turner Motorsports (later Turner Scott Motorsports) to run the full UARA season, the PASS Series, six races in the K&N East Series and one in the West series, and selected NASCAR Late Model Stock races. Cale Gale and Mike Greci would serve as crew chiefs for Jones. Jones would also make his national series debut in the Camping World Truck Series for TSM, running the No. 33 truck for the team beginning at Bristol Motor Speedway in August. Jones finished 27th at Bristol, twentieth at Iowa, and nineteenth at Martinsville.

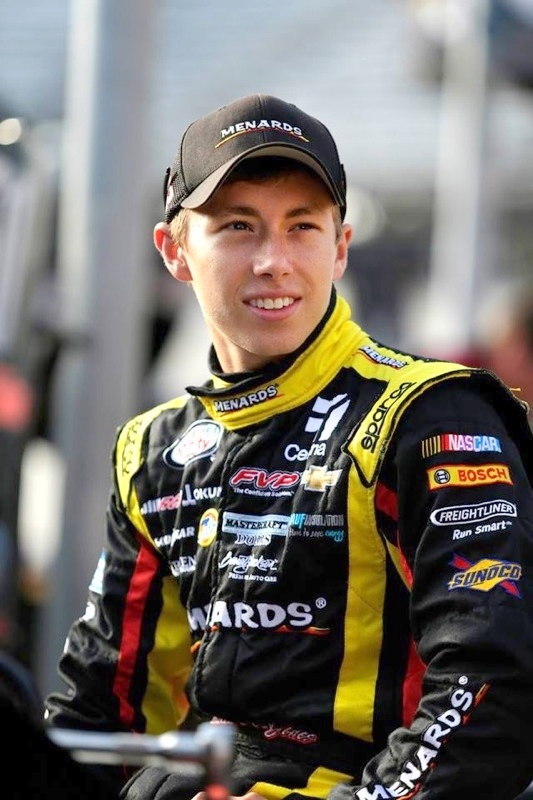
Jones at Kentucky Speedway in September 2015

In 2014, Jones would move into the K&N Pro Series East full-time for Turner Scott Motorsports, joining fellow teenager Ben Rhodes. Jones also ran an expanded Truck Series schedule and select ARCA Racing Series events. Jones' efforts would be headed by another former driver Shane Huffman. Jones won his debut ARCA race at Winchester Speedway, scored a second win at Indianapolis Raceway Park and finished third at Madison International Speedway. He would score his first K&N Pro Series win at Iowa Speedway in August, holding off former teammate Kenzie Ruston and Cole Custer. After fourteen of sixteen races in the K&N East Series and three Truck Series races, which included a fourth-place finish at Dover, Jones would part ways with TSM due to internal issues in the organization, joining Richard Childress Racing for the remaining K&N races. Jones would run the 33 truck for GMS Racing in two additional races, sponsored by Rheem brand Russell. He would finish fourth in the K&N Pro Series East standings.

=== Xfinity Series with RCR ===
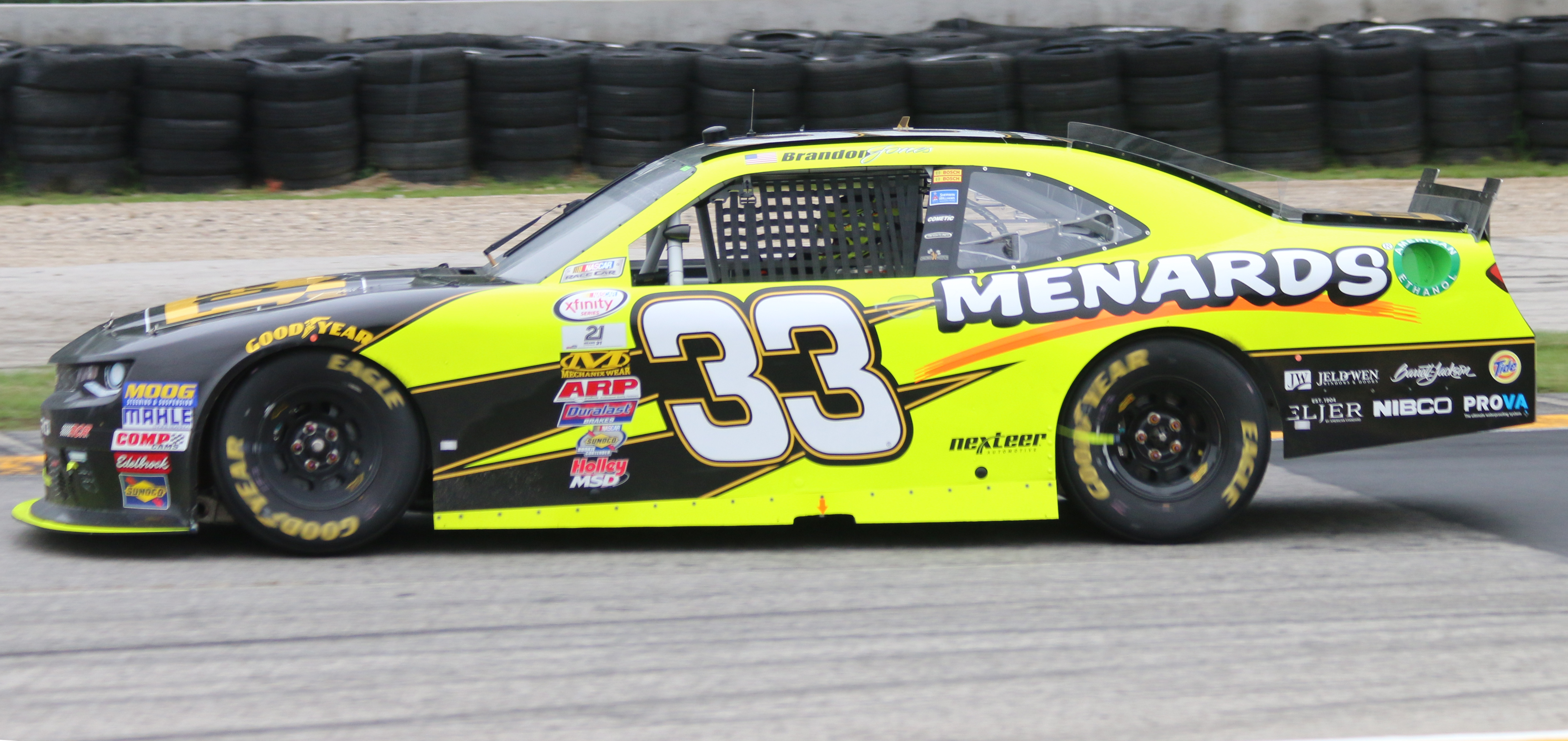
Jones' No. 33 at Road America in 2016

For 2015, Richard Childress Racing signed Jones to a part-time schedule in the NASCAR Xfinity Series, sharing the No. 33 Chevrolet Camaro with Childress' grandson Austin Dillon and Paul Menard. At Jones's final race of the campaign — the fall Kentucky event — he scored his first top five in the series by finishing fifth. Jones also ran a part-time schedule in the ARCA Racing Series, sharing the No. 25 Menards Toyota Camry for Venturini Motorsports with ARCA legend Frank Kimmel, as well as contesting sixteen races in the Truck Series for GMS Racing. Jones also ran select K&N Pro Series East races for NTS Motorsports.

On September 24, RCR announced that Jones would begin competing full-time in the Xfinity Series in 2016, keeping the No. 33. Jones also joined Ranier Racing to compete part-time in the Truck Series, driving the No. 71. He started the season with a seventh-place finish after being involved in the first crash at Daytona. His breakout race came at Talladega, where Jones led the most laps with 31 but finished 18th. Having avoided DNFs throughout the season, Jones qualified for the Playoffs where he was eliminated in the Round of 12. He ended up totaling twelve top-ten finishes — none of them being top-fives — and finished tenth in the overall standings.

To start 2017, Jones won his first career Xfinity Series pole at Daytona with a speed of 184.472 mph. In the race, Jones would run in the top-ten up until lap 29 when his car turned hard right into the SAFER Barrier as a result of The Big One. He walked away from the crash unharmed. Overall, Jones could not build on his rookie season, missing out on the Playoffs and retiring from eight races. Following the season, he would replace Matt Tifft at Joe Gibbs Racing for the 2018 season.

=== First Xfinity wins at JGR ===
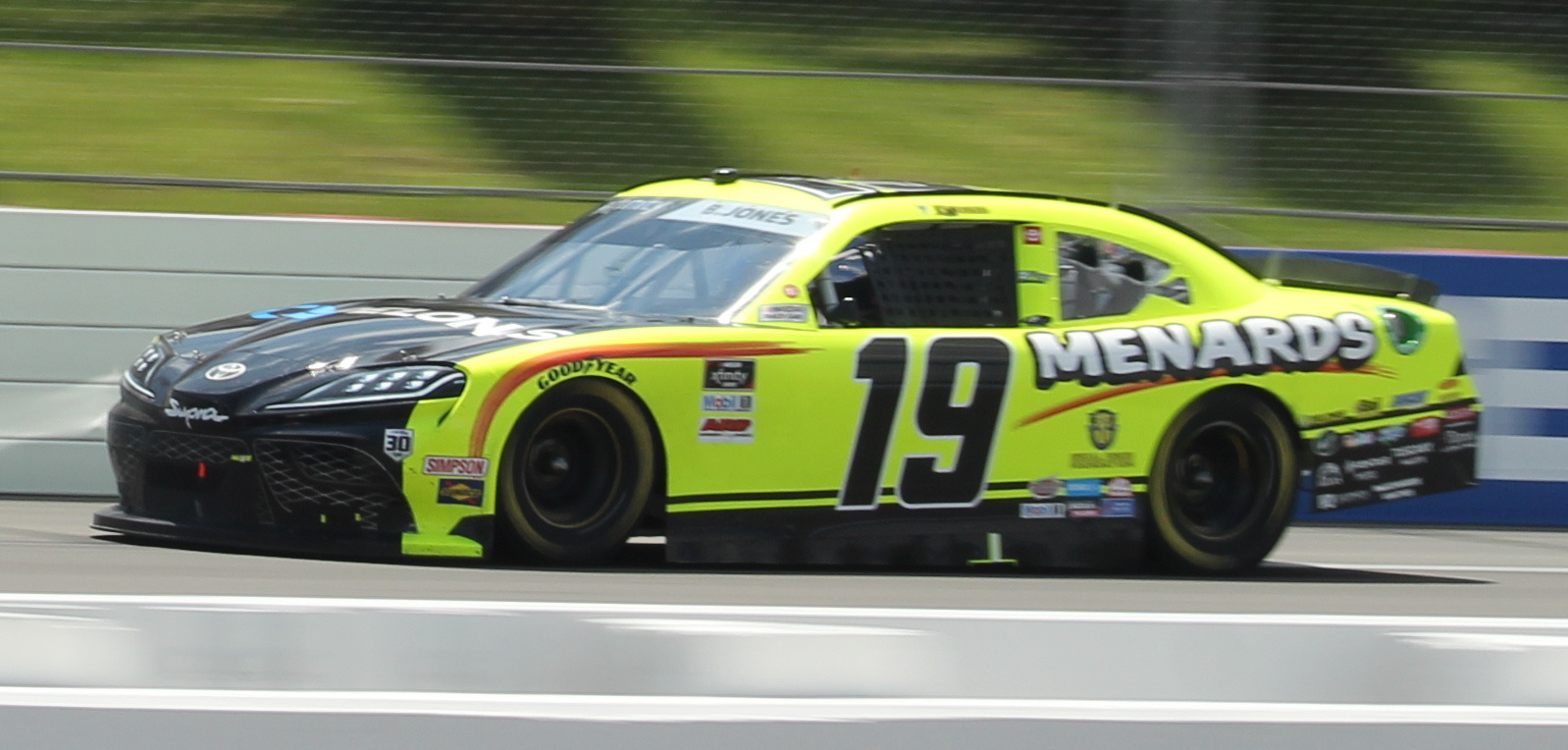
Jones' No. 19 at Pocono Raceway in 2021

Jones began his tenure at JGR with a tenth place at the Daytona season opener. He soon experienced a hot streak during the spring, leading the most laps at Bristol and finishing sixth, taking second at Talladega, and getting a pole position at Dover. Though this and further top-tens helped Jones to qualify for the Playoffs, he was unable to finish any post-season event higher than sixth, leading to a ninth place in the drivers' standings after an elimination in the Round of 12.

In 2019, Jones remained at JGR and scored four top-tens on his way to another Playoff appearance. He was eliminated from the Round of 12 once again after an early wreck at Dover but redeemed himself at Kansas, taking his first win in the Xfinity Series. Jones began the 2020 Xfinity Series season with two straight top-ten finishes. After winning the pole in the third race at Auto Club Speedway he scored his second career Xfinity win the following week at Phoenix Raceway after passing Kyle Busch with twenty laps remaining. His second win of the year followed at Kansas, as Jones passed Austin Cindric for the lead on the final lap. Just over a month later, Jones clinched his third victory at Darlington by pulling ahead of Denny Hamlin and Ross Chastain with two laps remaining. His wins qualified him for the Playoffs, where Jones made it through to the Round of 8 before being eliminated following a multi-car crash at Texas. Nevertheless, Jones finished a series-best sixth in the standings at the end of the year.

Jones continued driving for Joe Gibbs in 2021. After scoring nine top fives but equally having ten results of 33rd or worse during the regular season, Jones entered the Playoffs seeded in tenth. Finishing second at the rain-shortened Talladega race and fifth at the Roval helped him progress through the first round, though Jones would once again be eliminated during the Round of 8 — he finished the year seventh in points.

In 2022, during his final season at JGR, Jones finished inside the top ten less frequently but won at Martinsville during the spring, making a last lap pass over the night's most dominant driver Ty Gibbs. The same track would see the sight of Jones's best opportunity to qualify for the Championship 4: having battled through the Round of 12, Jones was leading the Martinsville playoff race, having overtaken Gibbs during the final overtime lap, when Gibbs dumped him from behind for the win, resulting in a 23rd-place finish and an elimination in the Round of 8 for Jones. Following the incident, Jones claimed that he had "lost all respect" for Gibbs, whose actions prevented the No. 19 driver from locking in to the title race. Jones finished eighth in the standings. During the same year, Jones and JGR also ran five races in the ARCA Menards Series; Jones would win three of them.

=== Two years at JR Motorsports ===
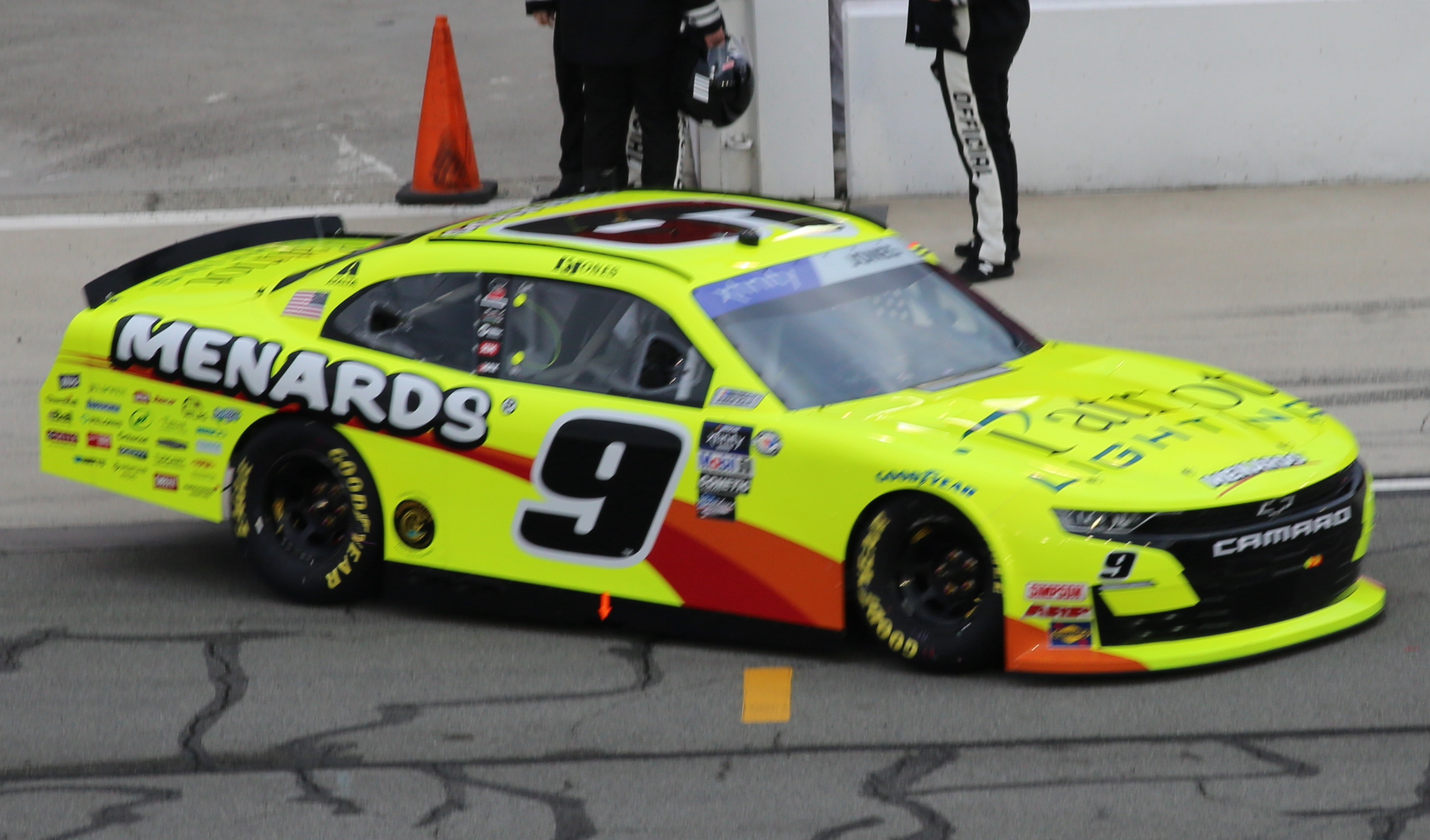
Jones at Auto Club Speedway in 2023

On September 14, 2022, it was announced that Jones would join JR Motorsports for the 2023 season. His maiden season at the Chevy-running team was a disappointment, as the Georgia native only took three top fives during the season. This included a runner-up finish at the Kansas cutoff race, where a dominating performance by John Hunter Nemechek prevented Jones from qualifying for the Playoffs with a win. He eventually ended up fourteenth in the championship. Jones remained in the No. 9 car during 2024 but did not improve his results; despite taking three pole positions across the year he only claimed a single top five result at Charlotte, where he pressured Chase Elliott for the win, and retired from a total of ten races — twice due to engine issues, eight times due to crashes. He once again missed out on the Playoffs and finished fourteenth in the standings.

=== Return to JGR ===
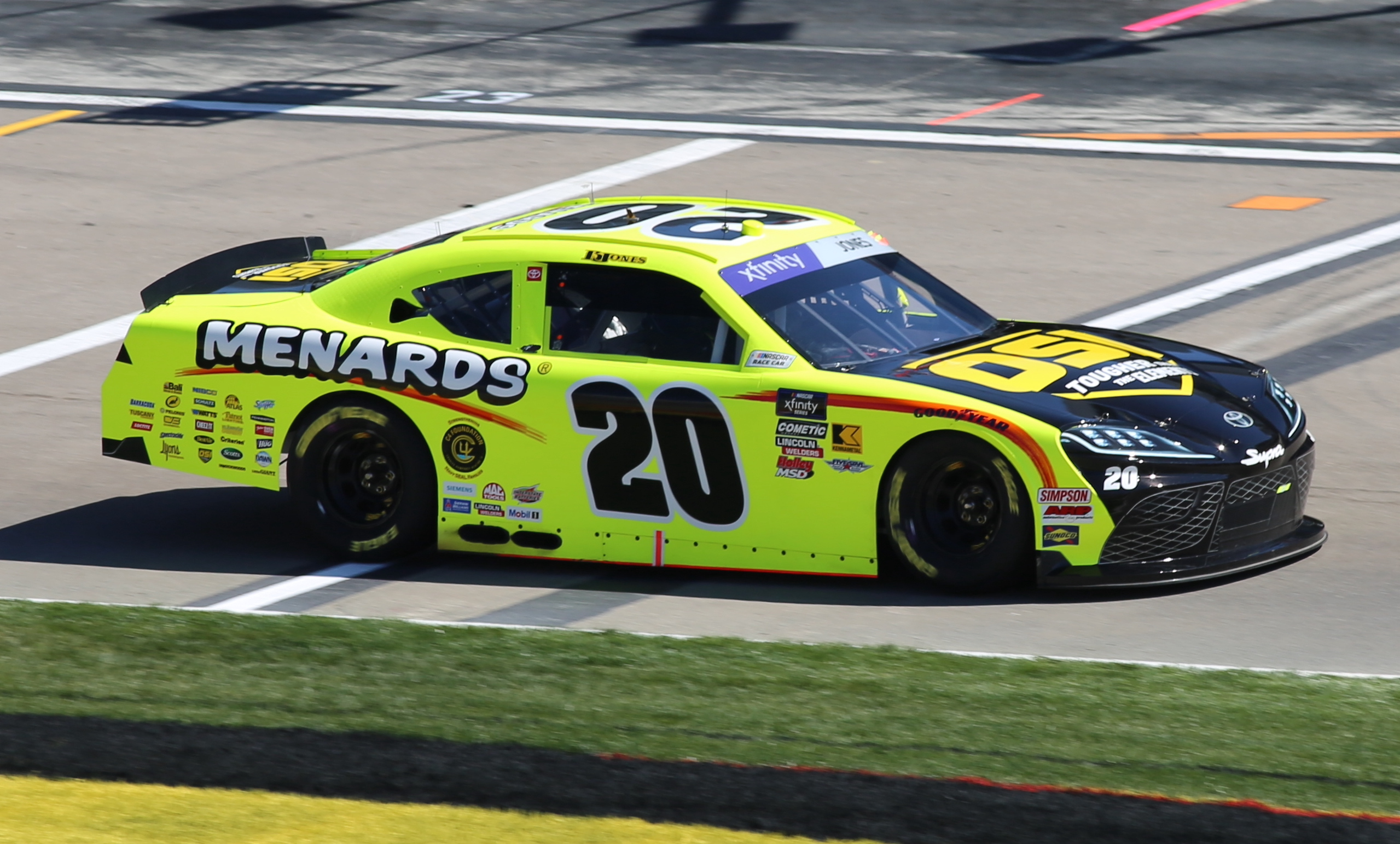
Jones' No. 20 car at Las Vegas Motor Speedway in 2025

For the 2025 season, Jones returned to Joe Gibbs Racing, driving the No. 20 car. He started the season with a 37th-place finish at Daytona. At Darlington, Jones snapped a 98-race winless streak with a win by over ten-car lengths. During the playoffs, he won at Kansas.

He started the 2026 season with a 30th-place DNF at Daytona. At Chicagoland, Jones earned his first win of the season. On August 27, he signed a contract extension with JGR. At Las Vegas, Jones was DQ'ed for having four or more lug nuts not safe & secure. Jones won the season finale at Homestead.

== Personal life ==
Brandon Jones is the son of JR Jones, President and CEO of Rheem Comfort Products, which has sponsored Jones, Kevin Harvick, Turner Scott Motorsports, Richard Childress Racing, Joe Gibbs Racing, and several other teams through their Rheem, RUUD, Richmond, and Russel/HTPG brands.

Jones graduated from Lake Norman High School in Mooresville, North Carolina. He is married to Ashley Jones.

== Motorsports career results ==
=== Career summary ===
Season	Series	Team	Races	Wins	Top 5	Top 10	Points	Position
2012	NASCAR K&N Pro Series East	Eddie Sharp Racing	1	0	0	0	30	60th
2013	NASCAR K&N Pro Series East	Turner Scott Motorsports	6	0	0	2	151	23rd
2013	NASCAR K&N Pro Series West	Turner Scott Motorsports	1	0	0	0	26	63rd
2013	NASCAR Camping World Truck Series	Turner Scott Motorsports	3	0	0	0	67	41st
2014	NASCAR K&N Pro Series East	DRIVE Technology	1	0	0	0	551	4th
2014	NASCAR K&N Pro Series East	Turner Scott Motorsports	15	1	5	11	551	4th
2014	ARCA Racing Series	Turner Scott Motorsports	3	2	3	3	600	37th
2014	NASCAR Camping World Truck Series	Turner Scott Motorsports	3	0	1	1	138	31st
2014	NASCAR Camping World Truck Series	GMS Racing	2	0	0	0	138	31st
2015	NASCAR K&N Pro Series East	NTS Motorsports	2	0	1	1	68	36th
2015	ARCA Racing Series	Venturini Motorsports	10	0	5	7	1925	15th
2015	NASCAR Camping World Truck Series	GMS Racing	17	0	4	7	482	15th
2015	NASCAR Xfinity Series	Richard Childress Racing	5	0	1	2	0	NC†
2016	ARCA Racing Series	Ranier Racing with MDM	5	1	3	3	875	31st
2016	NASCAR Camping World Truck Series	Ranier Racing with MDM	5	0	0	2	0	NC†
2016	NASCAR Xfinity Series	Richard Childress Racing	33	0	0	12	2168	10th
2017	NASCAR K&N Pro Series East	MDM Motorsports	1	0	0	0	33	54th
2017	ARCA Racing Series	MDM Motorsports	3	1	3	3	695	33rd
2017	NASCAR Camping World Truck Series	MDM Motorsports	5	0	2	4	0	NC†
2017	NASCAR Xfinity Series	Richard Childress Racing	33	0	0	3	549	16th
2018	ARCA Racing Series	MDM Motorsports	2	1	1	1	370	61st
2018	NASCAR Camping World Truck Series	Kyle Busch Motorsports	5	0	3	4	0	NC†
2018	NASCAR Xfinity Series	Joe Gibbs Racing	33	0	2	17	2186	9th
2019	NASCAR K&N Pro Series East	Bill-McAnally Racing	1	0	0	0	30	40th
2019	NASCAR Gander Outdoors Truck Series	Kyle Busch Motorsports	5	0	3	3	0	NC†
2019	NASCAR Xfinity Series	Joe Gibbs Racing	33	1	6	16	2207	10th
2020	NASCAR Gander Outdoors Truck Series	Kyle Busch Motorsports	4	1	1	2	0	NC†
2020	NASCAR Xfinity Series	Joe Gibbs Racing	33	3	10	19	2273	6th
2021	ARCA Menards Series	Venturini Motorsports	2	0	2	2	80	46th
2021	NASCAR Xfinity Series	Joe Gibbs Racing	33	0	11	19	2239	7th
2022	ARCA Menards Series East	Joe Gibbs Racing	2	1	2	2	90	21st
2022	ARCA Menards Series	Joe Gibbs Racing	5	3	5	5	227	19th
2022	NASCAR Xfinity Series	Joe Gibbs Racing	33	1	6	13	2221	8th
2023	NASCAR Xfinity Series	JR Motorsports	33	0	3	10	793	14th
2024	CARS Late Model Stock Tour	Hawk McCall Motorsports	2	0	0	0	0	NC†
2024	CARS Late Model Stock Tour	TG Motorsports	1	0	0	0	0	NC†
2024	ARCA Menards Series West	Cook Racing Technologies	2	0	1	2	80	27th
2024	ARCA Menards Series	Cook Racing Technologies	1	0	1	1	35	85th
2024	NASCAR Xfinity Series	JR Motorsports	33	0	1	8	696	14th
2025	NASCAR Craftsman Truck Series	TRICON Garage	7	0	1	3	0	NC†
2025	NASCAR Xfinity Series	Joe Gibbs Racing	33	2	8	13	2240	5th
2026	NASCAR Craftsman Truck Series	TRICON Garage	4	0	1	3	0	NC†
2026	NASCAR O'Reilly Auto Parts Series	Joe Gibbs Racing	33	2	8	20	2314	8th

=== NASCAR ===
(key) (Bold – Pole position awarded by qualifying time. Italics – Pole position earned by points standings or practice time. * – Most laps led.)

==== O'Reilly Auto Parts Series ====
NASCAR O'Reilly Auto Parts Series results
Year	Team	No.	Make	1	2	3	4	5	6	7	8	9	10	11	12	13	14	15	16	17	18	19	20	21	22	23	24	25	26	27	28	29	30	31	32	33	NOAPSC	Pts	Ref
2015	Richard Childress Racing	33	Chevy	DAY	ATL	LVS	PHO	CAL	TEX	BRI	RCH	TAL	IOW; 8	CLT	DOV	MCH	CHI	DAY	KEN	NHA	IND	IOW; 20	GLN	MOH; 29	BRI; 13	ROA	DAR	RCH	CHI	KEN; 5	DOV	CLT	KAN	TEX	PHO	HOM	92nd	0^{1}	
2016	Richard Childress Racing	33	Chevy	DAY; 7	ATL; 11	LVS; 6	PHO; 11	CAL; 9	TEX; 9	BRI; 11	RCH; 15	TAL; 18*	DOV; 25	CLT; 7	POC; 8	MCH; 10	IOW; 12	DAY; 29	KEN; 11	NHA; 11	IND; 10	IOW; 16	GLN; 13	MOH; 19	BRI; 9	ROA; 16	DAR; 9	RCH; 23	CHI; 10	KEN; 26	DOV; 17	CLT; 16	KAN; 8	TEX; 19	PHO; 18	HOM; 15	10th	2168	
2017	Richard Childress Racing	33	Chevy	**DAY**; 29	ATL; 14	LVS; 15	PHO; 15	CAL; 32	TEX; 15	BRI; 20	RCH; 33	TAL; 37	CLT; 16	DOV; 29	POC; 36	MCH; 9	IOW; 23	DAY; 19	KEN; 40	NHA; 34	IND; 9	IOW; 10	GLN; 14	MOH; 14	BRI; 20	ROA; 25	DAR; 23	RCH; 23	CHI; 12	KEN; 13	DOV; 39	CLT; 13	KAN; 11	TEX; 35	PHO; 15	HOM; 14	16th	549	
2018	Joe Gibbs Racing	19	Toyota	DAY; 10	ATL; 17	LVS; 7	PHO; 11	CAL; 13	TEX; 33	BRI; 6*	RCH; 10	TAL; 2	**DOV**; 10	CLT; 15	POC; 24	MCH; 18	IOW; 5	CHI; 11	DAY; 12	KEN; 36	NHA; 6	IOW; 12	GLN; 7	MOH; 23	BRI; 29	ROA; 9	DAR; 12	IND; 10	LVS; 7	RCH; 8	ROV; 22	DOV; 6	KAN; 36	TEX; 6	PHO; 7	HOM; 8	9th	2186	
2019	Joe Gibbs Racing	19	Toyota	DAY; 3	ATL; 4	LVS; 28	PHO; 7	CAL; 7	TEX; 33	BRI; 14	RCH; 33	TAL; 18	DOV; 7	CLT; 10	POC; 38	MCH; 6	IOW; 11	CHI; 4	DAY; 30	KEN; 30	NHA; 9	IOW; 33	GLN; 17	MOH; 10	BRI; 11	ROA; 16	DAR; 7	IND; 6	LVS; 3	RCH; 11	ROV; 16	DOV; 37	KAN; 1	TEX; 4	PHO; 11	HOM; 8	10th	2207	
2020	Joe Gibbs Racing	19	Toyota	DAY; 4	LVS; 6	**CAL**; 30*	PHO; 1	DAR; 20	CLT; 27	BRI; 3	ATL; 8	HOM; 8	HOM; 2	TAL; 16	POC; 36	IRC; 37	KEN; 36	KEN; 30	TEX; 7	KAN; 1	ROA; 14	DRC; 2	DOV; 16	DOV; 4	DAY; 13	DAR; 1	RCH; 14	RCH; 8	BRI; 8	LVS; 11	TAL; 4	ROV; 10	KAN; 9	TEX; 25	MAR; 9	PHO; 3	6th	2273	
2021	Joe Gibbs Racing	19	Toyota	DAY; 38	DRC; 4	HOM; 2	LVS; 3	PHO; 33	ATL; 37	MAR; 5	TAL; 37	DAR; 3	DOV; 35	COA; 17	CLT; 8	MOH; 4	TEX; 5	NSH; 6	POC; 7	ROA; 19	ATL; 39	NHA; 38	GLN; 6	IRC; 36	MCH; 2	DAY; 40	DAR; 33	RCH; 20	BRI; 5	LVS; 6	TAL; 2	ROV; 5	TEX; 10	KAN; 11	MAR; 6	PHO; 7	7th	2239	
2022	Joe Gibbs Racing	19	Toyota	DAY; 17	CAL; 33	LVS; 10	PHO; 2	ATL; 7	COA; 18	RCH; 13	MAR; 1	TAL; 26	**DOV**; 7	DAR; 7	TEX; 14	CLT; 16	PIR; 11	NSH; 14	ROA; 5	ATL; 11	NHA; 28	POC; 17	IRC; 15	MCH; 4	GLN; 24	DAY; 20	**DAR**; 14	**KAN**; 4	BRI; 2	**TEX**; 27	TAL; 9	ROV; 7	LVS; 9	HOM; 15	**MAR**; 23	PHO; 11	8th	2221	
2023	JR Motorsports	9	Chevy	DAY; 14	CAL; 33	LVS; 21	PHO; 23	ATL; 19	COA; 11	RCH; 21	MAR; 5	TAL; 14	DOV; 8	DAR; 34	CLT; 9	PIR; 13	SON; 21	NSH; 24	CSC; 29	ATL; 33	NHA; 11	POC; 7	ROA; 10	MCH; 3	IRC; 21	GLN; 11	DAY; 36	DAR; 14	KAN; 2	BRI; 34	TEX; 9	ROV; 29	LVS; 8	HOM; 8	MAR; 16	PHO; 11	14th	793	
2024	JR Motorsports	9	Chevy	DAY; 9	ATL; 14	LVS; 9	PHO; 7	COA; 16	RCH; 37	**MAR**; 27	TEX; 13	TAL; 33	**DOV**; 19	DAR; 10	CLT; 2	PIR; 36	SON; 38	IOW; 36	NHA; 14	NSH; 13	CSC; 17	POC; 13	IND; 15	MCH; 36	DAY; 22	DAR; 32	ATL; 9	GLN; 28	BRI; 6	**KAN**; 6	TAL; 28	ROV; 11	**LVS**; 17	HOM; 19	MAR; 29	PHO; 18	14th	696	
2025	Joe Gibbs Racing	20	Toyota	DAY; 37	ATL; 13	COA; 30	PHO; 3	LVS; 6	HOM; 7	MAR; 22	DAR; 1	BRI; 5	CAR; 12	TAL; 28	TEX; 9	CLT; 19	NSH; 13	MXC; 25	POC; 18	ATL; 14	CSC; 21	SON; 13	DOV; 3	IND; 32	IOW; 23	GLN; 9	DAY; 6	PIR; 18	GTW; 4	BRI; 11	**KAN**; 1	ROV; 18	LVS; 13	TAL; 26	MAR; 3	**PHO**; 4	5th	2240	
2026	Joe Gibbs Racing	20	Toyota	DAY; 30	ATL; 10	COA; 15	PHO; 16	LVS; 13	DAR; 2	MAR; 18	CAR; 2	BRI; 19	KAN; 8*	TAL; 8	TEX; 8	GLN; 5	DOV; 6	CLT; 35	NSH; 5	**POC**; 8	COR; 12	SON; 36	CHI; 1	ATL; 7	IND; 9	IOW; 14	DAY; 5	DAR; 10	GTW; 15	BRI; 15	LVS; 36	CLT; 6	PHO; 6	TAL; 9	MAR; 4	HOM; 1	8th	2314	

==== Craftsman Truck Series ====
NASCAR Craftsman Truck Series results
Year	Team	No.	Make	1	2	3	4	5	6	7	8	9	10	11	12	13	14	15	16	17	18	19	20	21	22	23	24	25	NCTC	Pts	Ref
2013	Turner Scott Motorsports	33	Chevy	DAY	MAR	CAR	KAN	CLT	DOV	TEX	KEN	IOW	ELD	POC	MCH	BRI; 27	MSP	IOW; 20	CHI	LVS	TAL	MAR; 19	TEX	PHO	HOM				41st	67	
2014	Turner Scott Motorsports	33	Chevy	DAY	MAR; 15	KAN	CLT	DOV; 4	TEX	GTW	KEN	IOW	ELD	POC	MCH	BRI; 20	MSP	CHI	NHA	LVS	TAL								31st	138	
2014	GMS Racing	33	Chevy																			MAR; 32	TEX	PHO; 12	HOM				31st	138	
2015	GMS Racing	33	Chevy	DAY	ATL	MAR; 15	KAN; 30	CLT; 13	DOV; 8	TEX; 22	GTW; 12	IOW; 2	KEN; 10	ELD	POC	MCH	BRI; 5	MSP; 26	CHI; 17	NHA	LVS; 5	TAL; 2	MAR; 7	TEX; 7	PHO; 32	HOM; 31			15th	482	
2016	Ranier Racing with MDM	71	Chevy	DAY	ATL	MAR	KAN	DOV; 20	CLT; 11	TEX	IOW; 17	GTW	KEN; 7	ELD	POC	BRI; 9	MCH	MSP	CHI	NHA	LVS	TAL	MAR	TEX	PHO	HOM			86th	0^{1}	
2017	MDM Motorsports	99	Chevy	DAY	ATL	MAR	KAN	CLT; 31	DOV; 6	TEX	GTW	IOW; 3	KEN; 2	ELD	POC	MCH	BRI; 10	MSP	CHI	NHA	LVS	TAL	MAR	TEX	PHO	HOM			77th	0^{1}	
2018	Kyle Busch Motorsports	51	Toyota	DAY	ATL	LVS	MAR	DOV	KAN; 9					CHI; 5	KEN; 4	ELD	POC	MCH	BRI	MSP	LVS; 26	TAL	MAR	TEX	PHO	HOM			94th	0^{1}	
2018	Kyle Busch Motorsports	46	Toyota							CLT; 3	TEX	IOW	GTW																94th	0^{1}	
2019	Kyle Busch Motorsports	51	Toyota	DAY	ATL	LVS	MAR	TEX	DOV; 13	KAN; 5	CLT	TEX	IOW	GTW	CHI; 2	KEN; 23	POC	ELD	MCH	BRI	MSP	LVS	TAL	MAR	PHO; 2	HOM			97th	0^{1}	
2020	Kyle Busch Motorsports	51	Toyota	DAY	LVS	CLT	ATL	HOM	POC; 1	KEN	TEX	KAN; 14	KAN; 8	MCH	DRC	DOV	GTW	DAR	RCH	BRI	LVS	TAL	KAN	TEX	MAR; 17	PHO			80th	0^{1}	
2025	Tricon Garage	1	Toyota	DAY	ATL	LVS	HOM; 12	MAR	BRI; 32	CAR; 17	TEX; 30	KAN; 6	NWS	CLT; 10	NSH	MCH	POC; 4	LRP	IRP	GLN	RCH	DAR	BRI	NHA	ROV	TAL	MAR	PHO	82nd	0^{1}	
2026	Tricon Garage	1	Toyota	DAY	ATL	STP	DAR	CAR	BRI	TEX; 4	GLN	DOV; 6	CLT; 7	NSH; 13	MCH	COR	LRP	NWS	IRP	RCH	NHA	BRI	KAN	CLT	PHO	TAL	MAR	HOM	103rd	0^{1}	

^{*} Season still in progress
^{1} Ineligible for series points

=== ARCA Menards Series ===
(key) (Bold – Pole position awarded by qualifying time. Italics – Pole position earned by points standings or practice time. * – Most laps led.)

ARCA Menards Series results
Year	Team	No.	Make	1	2	3	4	5	6	7	8	9	10	11	12	13	14	15	16	17	18	19	20	AMSC	Pts	Ref
2014	Turner Scott Motorsports	4	Chevy	DAY	MOB	SLM	TAL	TOL	NJE	POC	MCH	ELK	WIN; 1	CHI	**IRP**; 1	POC	BLN	ISF	MAD; 3	DSF	SLM	KEN	KAN	37th	600	
2015	Venturini Motorsports	25	Toyota	DAY	MOB; 2	NSH; 4	SLM; 6	TAL; 4	TOL	NJE; 10	POC	MCH	CHI	WIN; 3*	IOW; 11	IRP; 5	POC	BLN	ISF	DSF	SLM	KEN; 12	KAN; 22	15th	1925	
2016	Ranier Racing with MDM	8	Chevy	DAY	NSH	SLM	TAL	TOL	NJE	POC; 3	MCH; 1*	MAD	WIN	IOW	IRP	POC	BLN	ISF	DSF	SLM	CHI; 22	KEN; 29	KAN; 4	31st	875	
2017	MDM Motorsports	8	Chevy	DAY	NSH	SLM	TAL	TOL	ELK	POC; 2	**MCH**; 1	MAD	IOW	IRP	POC	WIN	ISF	ROA	DSF	SLM	**CHI**; 3	KEN	KAN	33rd	695	
2018	MDM Motorsports	12	Toyota	DAY	NSH	SLM	TAL	TOL	CLT; 1	POC	**MCH**; 22	MAD	GTW	CHI	IOW	ELK	POC	ISF	BLN	DSF	SLM	IRP	KAN	61st	370	
2021	Venturini Motorsports	25	Toyota	DAY	PHO	TAL	KAN	TOL	CLT	MOH; 4	POC	ELK	BLN	IOW	WIN	GLN; 5	MCH	ISF	MLW	DSF	BRI	SLM	KAN	46th	80	
2022	Joe Gibbs Racing	81	Toyota	DAY	PHO	TAL	KAN	**CLT**; 1*	IOW; 1	BLN	ELK	MOH	POC; 3	IRP	MCH	GLN; 1	ISF	MLW	DSF	KAN	BRI; 2	SLM	TOL	19th	227	
2024	Cook Racing Technologies	42	Chevy	DAY	PHO	TAL	DOV	KAN	CLT	IOW	MOH	BLN	IRP	SLM	ELK	MCH	ISF	MLW	DSF	GLN; 3	BRI	KAN	TOL	85th	35	

==== ARCA Menards Series East ====
ARCA Menards Series East results
Year	Team	No.	Make	1	2	3	4	5	6	7	8	9	10	11	12	13	14	15	16	AMSEC	Pts	Ref
2012	Eddie Sharp Racing	33	Chevy	BRI	GRE	RCH	IOW	BGS	JFC	LGY	CNB	COL	IOW	NHA	DOV	GRE; 14	CAR			60th	30	
2013	Turner Scott Motorsports	33	Chevy	BRI; 31	GRE	FIF	RCH; 36	BGS	IOW; 8	LGY	COL	IOW; 19	VIR	GRE	NHA; 12	DOV; 7	RAL			23rd	151	
2014	Turner Scott Motorsports	33	Chevy	NSM; 3	DAY; DNQ	BRI; 8	GRE; 23	RCH; 7	IOW; 5	BGS; 4	FIF; 2	LGY; 6	NHA; 21	COL; 14	IOW; 1	GLN; 6	VIR; 7	GRE; 7	DOV; 21	4th	551	
2014	DRIVE Technology	18	Toyota		DAY; 24															4th	551	
2015	NTS Motorsports	33	Chevy	NSM	GRE	BRI; 5	IOW	BGS	LGY	COL	NHA	IOW	GLN	MOT	VIR	RCH; 15	DOV			36th	68	
2017	MDM Motorsports	40	Chevy	NSM	GRE	BRI	SBO	SBO	MEM	BLN	TMP	NHA	IOW	GLN; 11	LGY	NJM	DOV			54th	33	
2019	Bill McAnally Racing	19	Toyota	NSM	BRI	SBO	SBO	MEM	NHA	IOW	GLN; 14	BRI	GTW	NHA	DOV					40th	30	
2022	Joe Gibbs Racing	81	Toyota	NSM	FIF	NSV	DOV	IOW; 1	MLW	BRI; 2										21st	90	

==== ARCA Menards Series West ====
ARCA Menards Series West results
Year	Team	No.	Make	1	2	3	4	5	6	7	8	9	10	11	12	13	14	15	AMSWC	Pts	Ref
2013	Turner Scott Motorsports	33	Chevy	PHO	S99	BIR	IOW	L44	SON	CNS	IOW	EVG	SPO	MMP	SMP	AAS	KCR	PHO; 17	63rd	26	
2024	Cook Racing Technologies	42	Chevy	PHO	KER	**PIR**; 2	SON; 8	IRW	IRW	SHA	TRI	MAD	AAS	KER	PHO				27th	80	

=== CARS Late Model Stock Car Tour ===
(key) (Bold – Pole position awarded by qualifying time. Italics – Pole position earned by points standings or practice time. * – Most laps led. ** – All laps led.)

CARS Late Model Stock Car Tour results
Year	Team	No.	Make	1	2	3	4	5	6	7	8	9	10	11	12	13	14	15	16	17	CLMSCTC	Pts	Ref
2024	Hawk McCall Motorsports	9	Chevy	SNM	HCY	AAS	OCS	ACE; 13	TCM	LGY	DOM	CRW	HCY; 13								N/A	0	
2024	TG Motorsports	1	Chevy											NWS; 23	ACE	WCS	FLC	SBO	TCM	NWS	N/A	0	
