= 2026 Sports Illustrated Resorts 250 =

NASCAR O'Reilly Auto Parts Series race at Nashville Superspeedway

Race details
- Race 16 of 33 in the 2026 NASCAR O'Reilly Auto Parts Series
- Date: May 30, 2026
- Location: Nashville Superspeedway in Lebanon, Tennessee
- Course: Permanent racing facility
- Course length: 1.333 miles (2.145 km)
- Distance: 188 laps, 250 mi (402.335 km)
- Average speed: 132.452 miles per hour (213.161 km/h)

Pole position
Driver	Jesse Love	Richard Childress Racing
- Grid positions set by competition-based formula

Most laps led
Driver	Jesse Love	Richard Childress Racing
- Laps: 87

Fastest lap
Driver	Justin Allgaier	JR Motorsports
- Time: 30.839

Winner
No. 7	Justin Allgaier	JR Motorsports

Television in the United States
- Network: The CW
- Announcers: Adam Alexander, Parker Kligerman, and Connor Zilisch

Radio in the United States
- Radio: PRN
- Booth announcers: Brad Gillie, Ross Chastain, and Joey Logano
- Turn announcers: Andrew Kurland (1 & 2) and Pat Patterson (3 & 4)

The 2026 Sports Illustrated Resorts 250 was a NASCAR O'Reilly Auto Parts Series race held on Saturday, May 30, 2026, at Nashville Superspeedway in Lebanon, Tennessee. Contested over 188 laps on the 1 1/3-mile (2.146 km) speedway, it was the sixteenth race of the 2026 NASCAR O'Reilly Auto Parts Series season, and the sixth running of the event.

Justin Allgaier, driving for JR Motorsports, made a late-race pass on Brent Crews, pulling away and leading the final 19 laps to earn his 32nd career NASCAR O'Reilly Auto Parts Series win, and his fourth of the season. Pole-sitter Jesse Love dominated the majority of the event by winning the first stage and leading a race-high 87 laps, before experiencing a loose wheel in the final stage and fell back to finish 16th. Crews finished second, and William Sawalich finished third. Sam Mayer and Brandon Jones rounded out the top five, while Corey Day, Carson Kvapil, Kyle Larson, Taylor Gray, and Sammy Smith rounded out the top ten.

== Report ==
=== Background ===
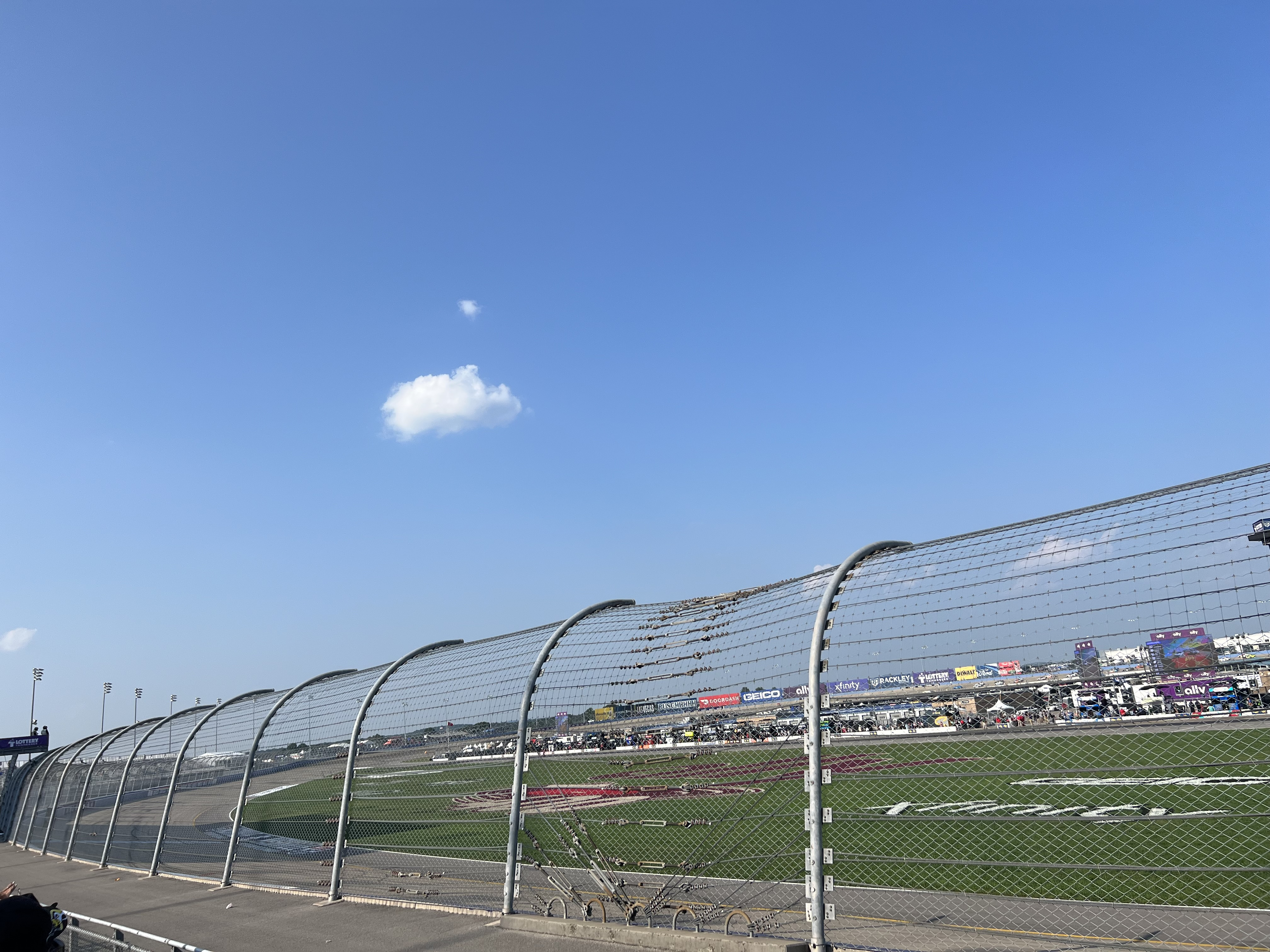
Nashville Superspeedway, the track where the race was held.

Nashville Superspeedway is a motor racing complex located in Lebanon, Tennessee, United States, about 30 miles (48 km) southeast of Nashville.

It is a concrete oval track 1 1/3 miles (2.146 km) long. Nashville Superspeedway is owned by Speedway Motorsports, which also owns many other NASCAR tracks. Nashville Superspeedway was the longest concrete oval in NASCAR during the time it was on the NASCAR Xfinity Series and NASCAR Craftsman Truck Series circuits. Current permanent seating capacity is approximately 25,000. Additional portable seats are brought in for some events, and seating capacity can be expanded to 150,000. Infrastructure is in place to expand the facility to include a short track, drag strip, and road course.

Sports Illustrated Resorts was announced as the title sponsor on March 10.

==== Entry list ====
- (R) denotes rookie driver.
- (i) denotes driver who is ineligible for series driver points.

#	Driver	Team	Make
00	Sheldon Creed	Haas Factory Team	Chevrolet
0	Garrett Smithley	SS-Green Light Racing	Chevrolet
1	Carson Kvapil	JR Motorsports	Chevrolet
02	Ryan Ellis	Young's Motorsports	Chevrolet
2	Jesse Love	Richard Childress Racing	Chevrolet
07	Josh Bilicki	SS-Green Light Racing	Chevrolet
7	Justin Allgaier	JR Motorsports	Chevrolet
8	Sammy Smith	JR Motorsports	Chevrolet
17	Corey Day	Hendrick Motorsports	Chevrolet
18	William Sawalich	Joe Gibbs Racing	Toyota
19	Brent Crews (R)	Joe Gibbs Racing	Toyota
20	Brandon Jones	Joe Gibbs Racing	Toyota
21	Austin Hill	Richard Childress Racing	Chevrolet
24	Harrison Burton	Sam Hunt Racing	Toyota
26	Dean Thompson	Sam Hunt Racing	Toyota
27	Jeb Burton	Jordan Anderson Racing	Chevrolet
28	Kyle Sieg	RSS Racing	Chevrolet
31	Blaine Perkins	Jordan Anderson Racing	Chevrolet
32	Rajah Caruth	Jordan Anderson Racing	Chevrolet
33	Cleetus McFarland	Richard Childress Racing	Chevrolet
35	Dawson Cram	Joey Gase Motorsports	Chevrolet
38	J. J. Yeley	RSS Racing	Ford
39	Ryan Sieg	RSS Racing	Chevrolet
41	Sam Mayer	Haas Factory Team	Chevrolet
42	Logan Bearden	Young's Motorsports	Chevrolet
44	Brennan Poole	Alpha Prime Racing	Chevrolet
45	Lavar Scott (R)	Alpha Prime Racing	Chevrolet
48	Patrick Staropoli (R)	Big Machine Racing	Chevrolet
51	Jeremy Clements	Jeremy Clements Racing	Chevrolet
53	David Starr	Joey Gase Motorsports	Chevrolet
54	Taylor Gray	Joe Gibbs Racing	Toyota
55	Joey Gase	Joey Gase Motorsports	Chevrolet
87	Austin Green	Peterson Racing	Chevrolet
88	Kyle Larson (i)	JR Motorsports	Chevrolet
91	Mason Maggio	DGM Racing	Chevrolet
92	Leland Honeyman (i)	DGM Racing	Chevrolet
96	Anthony Alfredo	Viking Motorsports	Chevrolet
99	Parker Retzlaff	Viking Motorsports	Chevrolet
Official entry list

== Practice ==
The first and only practice session was held on Saturday, May 30, at 2:00 PM CST. Originally scheduled for 50 minutes, the session was delayed and cut short due to heavy rain.

Carson Kvapil, driving for JR Motorsports, set the fastest time in the session, with a lap of 30.874 seconds, and a speed of 155.082 miles per hour (249.580 km/h).

=== Practice results ===
Pos.	#	Driver	Team	Make	Time	Speed
1	1	Carson Kvapil	JR Motorsports	Chevrolet	30.874	155.082
2	18	William Sawalich	Joe Gibbs Racing	Toyota	30.879	155.057
3	7	Justin Allgaier	JR Motorsports	Chevrolet	30.903	154.936
Full practice results

== Starting lineup ==
Qualifying was originally scheduled to be held on Saturday, May 30, at 2:05 PM CST, but was cancelled due to inclement weather. Jesse Love, driving for Richard Childress Racing, was awarded the pole position as a result of NASCAR's pandemic formula with a score of 2.300.

=== Starting lineup ===
Pos.	#	Driver	Team	Make
1	2	Jesse Love	Richard Childress Racing	Chevrolet
2	21	Austin Hill	Richard Childress Racing	Chevrolet
3	17	Corey Day	Hendrick Motorsports	Chevrolet
4	1	Carson Kvapil	JR Motorsports	Chevrolet
5	18	William Sawalich	Joe Gibbs Racing	Toyota
6	88	Kyle Larson (i)	JR Motorsports	Chevrolet
7	39	Ryan Sieg	RSS Racing	Chevrolet
8	8	Sammy Smith	JR Motorsports	Chevrolet
9	99	Parker Retzlaff	Viking Motorsports	Chevrolet
10	0	Garrett Smithley	SS-Green Light Racing	Chevrolet
11	91	Mason Maggio	DGM Racing	Chevrolet
12	96	Anthony Alfredo	Viking Motorsports	Chevrolet
13	26	Dean Thompson	Sam Hunt Racing	Toyota
14	87	Austin Green	Peterson Racing	Chevrolet
15	92	Leland Honeyman (i)	DGM Racing	Chevrolet
16	48	Patrick Staropoli (R)	Big Machine Racing	Chevrolet
17	7	Justin Allgaier	JR Motorsports	Chevrolet
18	45	Lavar Scott (R)	Alpha Prime Racing	Chevrolet
19	27	Jeb Burton	Jordan Anderson Racing	Chevrolet
20	28	Kyle Sieg	RSS Racing	Chevrolet
21	31	Blaine Perkins	Jordan Anderson Racing	Chevrolet
22	53	David Starr	Joey Gase Motorsports	Chevrolet
23	44	Brennan Poole	Alpha Prime Racing	Chevrolet
24	00	Sheldon Creed	Haas Factory Team	Chevrolet
25	32	Rajah Caruth	Jordan Anderson Racing	Chevrolet
26	02	Ryan Ellis	Young's Motorsports	Chevrolet
27	54	Taylor Gray	Joe Gibbs Racing	Toyota
28	07	Josh Bilicki	SS-Green Light Racing	Chevrolet
29	20	Brandon Jones	Joe Gibbs Racing	Toyota
30	55	Joey Gase	Joey Gase Motorsports	Chevrolet
31	51	Jeremy Clements	Jeremy Clements Racing	Chevrolet
32	42	Logan Bearden	Young's Motorsports	Chevrolet
Qualified by owner's points
33	19	Brent Crews (R)	Joe Gibbs Racing	Toyota
34	41	Sam Mayer	Haas Factory Team	Chevrolet
35	24	Harrison Burton	Sam Hunt Racing	Toyota
36	35	Dawson Cram	Joey Gase Motorsports	Chevrolet
37	38	J. J. Yeley	RSS Racing	Ford
38	33	Cleetus McFarland	Richard Childress Racing	Chevrolet
Official starting lineup

== Race ==
=== Race results ===
==== Stage Results ====
Stage One Laps: 45

Pos.	#	Driver	Team	Make	Pts
1	2	Jesse Love	Richard Childress Racing	Chevrolet	10
2	17	Corey Day	Hendrick Motorsports	Chevrolet	9
3	7	Justin Allgaier	JR Motorsports	Chevrolet	8
4	21	Austin Hill	Richard Childress Racing	Chevrolet	7
5	88	Kyle Larson (i)	JR Motorsports	Chevrolet	0
6	1	Carson Kvapil	JR Motorsports	Chevrolet	5
7	18	William Sawalich	Joe Gibbs Racing	Toyota	4
8	39	Ryan Sieg	RSS Racing	Chevrolet	3
9	8	Sammy Smith	JR Motorsports	Chevrolet	2
10	19	Brent Crews (R)	Joe Gibbs Racing	Toyota	1

Stage Two Laps: 50

Pos.	#	Driver	Team	Make	Pts
1	7	Justin Allgaier	JR Motorsports	Chevrolet	10
2	2	Jesse Love	Richard Childress Racing	Chevrolet	9
3	1	Carson Kvapil	JR Motorsports	Chevrolet	8
4	18	William Sawalich	Joe Gibbs Racing	Toyota	7
5	19	Brent Crews (R)	Joe Gibbs Racing	Toyota	6
6	17	Corey Day	Hendrick Motorsports	Chevrolet	5
7	41	Sam Mayer	Haas Factory Team	Chevrolet	4
8	99	Parker Retzlaff	Viking Motorsports	Chevrolet	3
9	88	Kyle Larson (i)	JR Motorsports	Chevrolet	0
10	39	Ryan Sieg	RSS Racing	Chevrolet	1

=== Final Stage Results ===
Stage Three Laps: 93

Fin	St	#	Driver	Team	Make	Laps	Led	Status	Pts
1	17	7	Justin Allgaier	JR Motorsports	Chevrolet	188	50	Running	74
2	33	19	Brent Crews (R)	Joe Gibbs Racing	Toyota	188	45	Running	42
3	5	18	William Sawalich	Joe Gibbs Racing	Toyota	188	0	Running	45
4	34	41	Sam Mayer	Haas Factory Team	Chevrolet	188	0	Running	37
5	29	20	Brandon Jones	Joe Gibbs Racing	Toyota	188	1	Running	32
6	3	17	Corey Day	Hendrick Motorsports	Chevrolet	188	0	Running	45
7	4	1	Carson Kvapil	JR Motorsports	Chevrolet	188	0	Running	43
8	6	88	Kyle Larson (i)	JR Motorsports	Chevrolet	188	0	Running	0
9	27	54	Taylor Gray	Joe Gibbs Racing	Toyota	188	0	Running	28
10	8	8	Sammy Smith	JR Motorsports	Chevrolet	188	0	Running	29
11	2	21	Austin Hill	Richard Childress Racing	Chevrolet	188	2	Running	33
12	9	99	Parker Retzlaff	Viking Motorsports	Chevrolet	188	0	Running	28
13	7	39	Ryan Sieg	RSS Racing	Chevrolet	188	2	Running	28
14	13	26	Dean Thompson	Sam Hunt Racing	Toyota	188	0	Running	23
15	24	00	Sheldon Creed	Haas Factory Team	Chevrolet	188	0	Running	22
16	1	2	Jesse Love	Richard Childress Racing	Chevrolet	188	87	Running	40
17	12	96	Anthony Alfredo	Viking Motorsports	Chevrolet	188	0	Running	20
18	31	51	Jeremy Clements	Jeremy Clements Racing	Chevrolet	187	0	Running	19
19	25	32	Rajah Caruth	Jordan Anderson Racing	Chevrolet	187	0	Running	18
20	21	31	Blaine Perkins	Jordan Anderson Racing	Chevrolet	187	0	Running	17
21	23	44	Brennan Poole	Alpha Prime Racing	Chevrolet	187	0	Running	16
22	15	92	Leland Honeyman (i)	DGM Racing	Chevrolet	187	0	Running	0
23	19	27	Jeb Burton	Jordan Anderson Racing	Chevrolet	187	0	Running	14
24	20	28	Kyle Sieg	RSS Racing	Chevrolet	187	0	Running	13
25	16	48	Patrick Staropoli (R)	Big Machine Racing	Chevrolet	187	0	Running	12
26	32	42	Logan Bearden	Young's Motorsports	Chevrolet	186	0	Running	11
27	35	24	Harrison Burton	Sam Hunt Racing	Toyota	186	0	Running	10
28	11	91	Mason Maggio	DGM Racing	Chevrolet	186	0	Running	9
29	26	02	Ryan Ellis	Young's Motorsports	Chevrolet	185	0	Running	8
30	14	87	Austin Green	Peterson Racing	Chevrolet	185	0	Running	7
31	18	45	Lavar Scott (R)	Alpha Prime Racing	Chevrolet	184	0	Running	6
32	28	07	Josh Bilicki	SS-Green Light Racing	Chevrolet	184	0	Running	5
33	10	0	Garrett Smithley	SS-Green Light Racing	Chevrolet	184	0	Running	4
34	36	35	Dawson Cram	Joey Gase Motorsports	Chevrolet	183	0	Running	3
35	38	33	Cleetus McFarland	Richard Childress Racing	Chevrolet	182	0	Running	2
36	30	55	Joey Gase	Joey Gase Motorsports	Chevrolet	179	0	Running	1
37	22	53	David Starr	Joey Gase Motorsports	Chevrolet	151	0	Suspension	1
38	37	38	J. J. Yeley	RSS Racing	Ford	59	1	Rear End	1
Official race results

=== Race statistics ===
- Lead changes: 12 among 7 different drivers
- Cautions/Laps: 2 for 15 laps
- Red flags: 0
- Time of race: 1 hour, 53 minutes and 16 seconds
- Average speed: 132.452 miles per hour (213.161 km/h)

== Standings after the race ==
Drivers' Championship standings

	Pos	Driver	Points
	1	Justin Allgaier	770
	2	Jesse Love	591 (–179)
	3	Corey Day	574 (–196)
	4	Sheldon Creed	532 (–238)
	5	Brandon Jones	512 (–258)
	6	Austin Hill	499 (–271)
1	7	Carson Kvapil	493 (–277)
1	8	Sammy Smith	482 (–288)
1	9	William Sawalich	429 (–341)
1	10	Parker Retzlaff	416 (–354)
	11	Sam Mayer	413 (–357)
	12	Taylor Gray	399 (–371)
Official driver's standings

Manufacturers' Championship standings

Pos	Manufacturer	Points
1	Chevrolet	839
2	Toyota	539 (–300)
3	Ford	188 (–651)

- Note: Only the first 12 positions are included for the driver standings.

Previous race: 2026 Charbroil 300	NASCAR O'Reilly Auto Parts Series; 2026 season	Next race: 2026 MillerTech Battery 250
