= Brennan Poole =

American racing driver (born 1991)

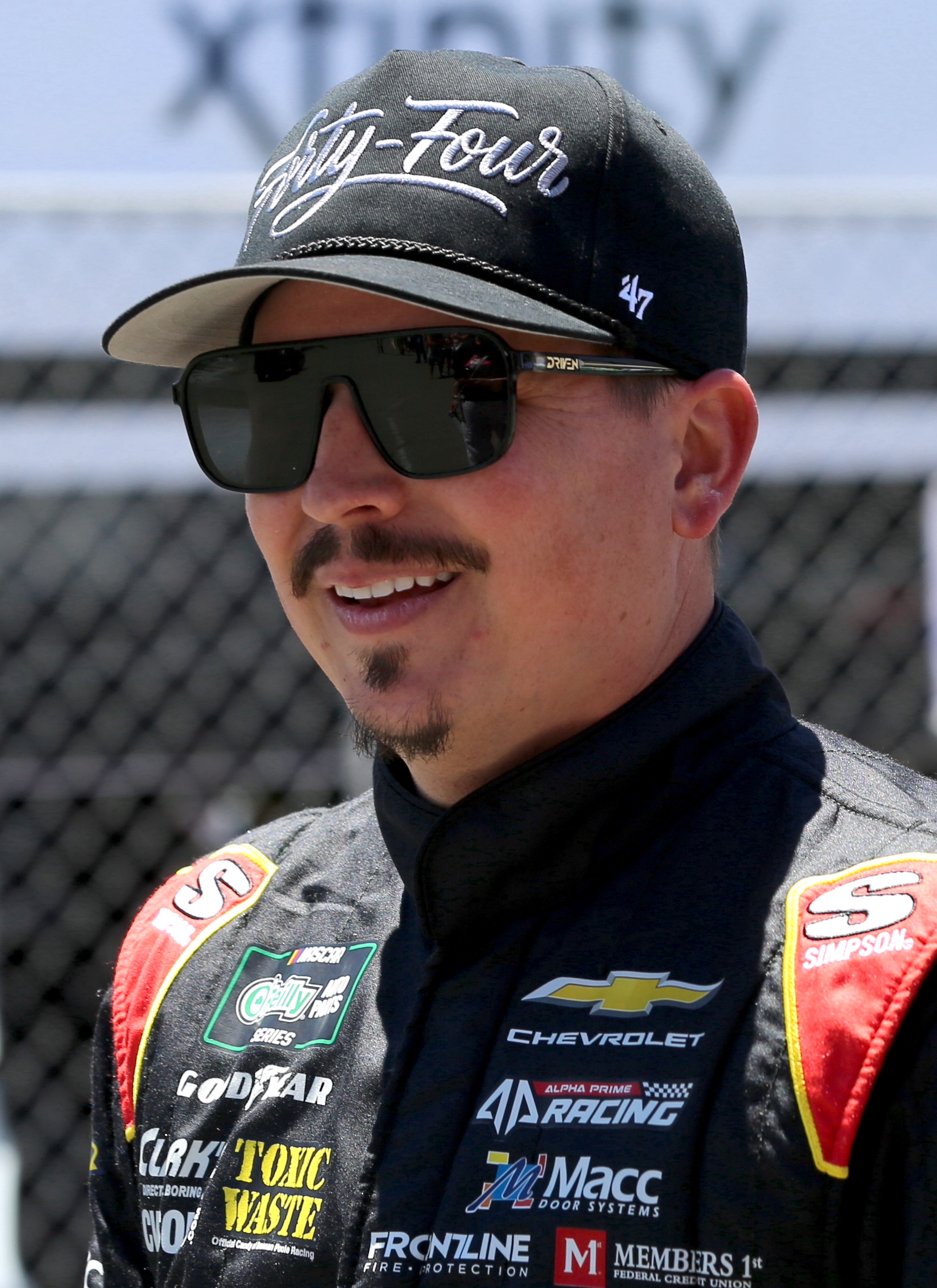
- Poole at Sonoma Raceway in 2026
- Born: April 11, 1991 (age 35); Folsom, California, U.S.
- Height: 5 ft 9 in (1.75 m)
- Weight: 160 lb (73 kg)
- Achievements: As Driver: 2011 UARA-Stars Late Model Series Champion; 2007 Texas World Dirt Track Championship Winner; Records: UARA-Stars; Holds record for most UARA-Stars Late Model Series wins in a single season (6 in 2010); Holds record for most consecutive UARA-Stars Late Model Series wins in a single season (3 in 2010); As Car Owner: 2011 UARA-Stars Late Model Series Champion (outright)
- Awards: 2009 UARA-Stars Late Model Series Rookie of the Year; 2009–2010 UARA-Stars Late Model Series Most Popular Driver

NASCAR Cup Series career
- 43 races run over 3 years
- 2025 position: 58th
- Best finish: 32nd (2020)
- First race: 2020 Daytona 500 (Daytona)
- Last race: 2025 The Great American Getaway 400 (Pocono)
Wins	Top tens	Poles
0	1	0

NASCAR O'Reilly Auto Parts Series career
- 223 races run over 8 years
- Car no., team: No. 31 (Jordan Anderson Racing)
- 2026 position: 18th
- Best finish: 6th (2017)
- First race: 2015 Boyd Gaming 300 (Las Vegas)
- Last race: 2026 O'Reilly Auto Parts 300 (Homestead)
Wins	Top tens	Poles
0	48	1

NASCAR FedEx Freight Truck Series career
- 39 races run over 8 years
- Truck no., team: No. 7 (Spire Motorsports)
- 2026 position: 113th
- Best finish: 18th (2019)
- First race: 2015 Rhino Linings 350 (Las Vegas)
- Last race: 2026 RaceToStopSuicide.com 200 (Kansas)
Wins	Top tens	Poles
0	4	0

ARCA Menards Series career
- 35 races run over 4 years
- Best finish: 3rd (2012)
- First race: 2011 Kentuckiana Ford Dealers 200 (Salem)
- Last race: 2014 ZLOOP 150 (Kentucky)
- First win: 2011 Kentuckiana Ford Dealers 200 (Salem)
- Last win: 2014 ZLOOP 150 (Kentucky)
Wins	Top tens	Poles
6	27	4
- Statistics up to date as of November 7, 2026.

Brennan Cole Poole (born April 11, 1991) is an American professional stock car racing driver. He competes full-time in the NASCAR O'Reilly Auto Parts Series, driving the No. 31 Chevrolet Camaro SS for Jordan Anderson Racing.

== Racing career ==
=== Early career ===
==== IMCA Modifieds and Dirt Late Models ====
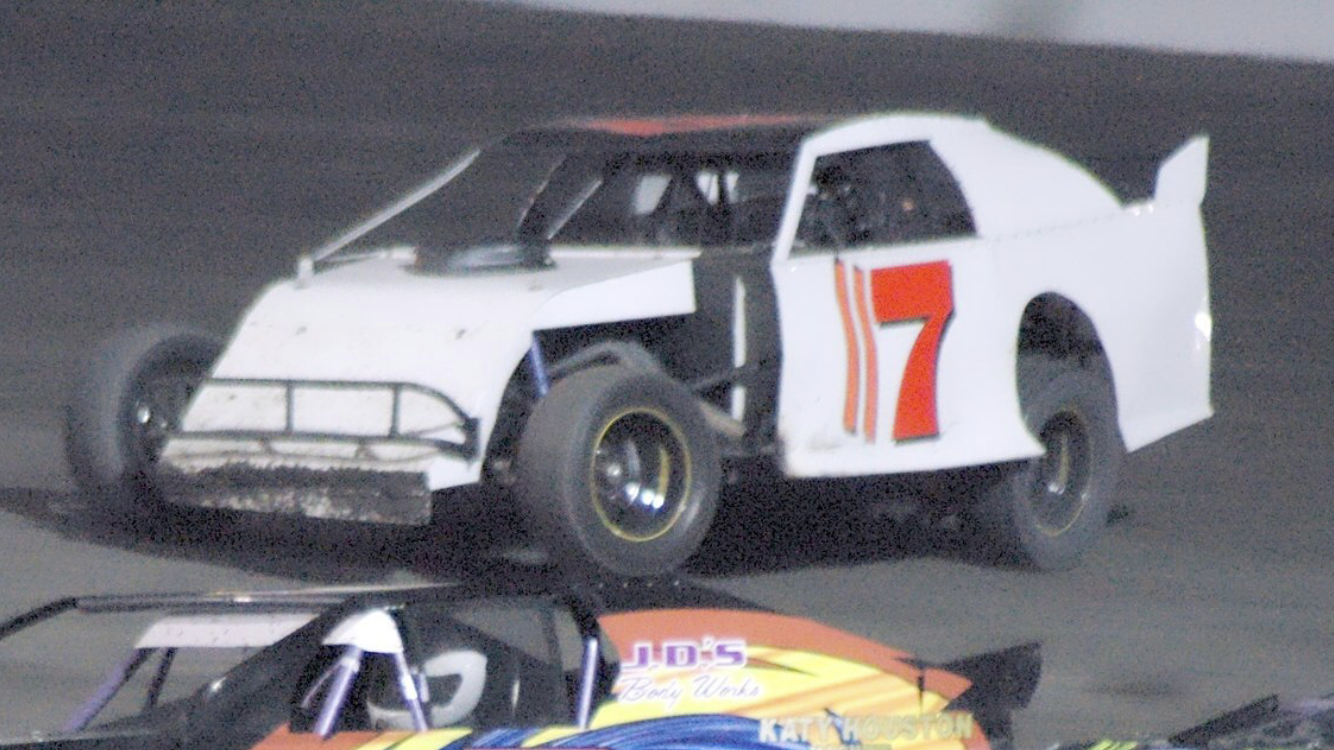
Poole driving a IMCA Modified in 2008 at Houston Raceway Park.

Poole drove in Dirt Modified's in the IMCA ranks from 2007 to 2008 for his family team at Houston Raceway Park. He earned seven dirt wins and the Texas World Dirt Track Championship before switching disciplines to asphalt in 2009.

Poole also ran some select Dirt Late Model races on the side, in addition to his IMCA schedule.

==== UARA-Stars Late Models ====
From 2009 to 2010, Poole raced Late Model Stock Cars in the UARA-Stars ranks, driving the No. 5 for Jamie Yelton, where he would score the Rookie of the Year title in 2009 and the Most Popular Driver Award both years as well. In 2010, he picked up his first win at Tri-County Motor Speedway and would go on to score five more coming at Hickory, Lonesome Pine Speedway, Kingsport Speedway, Dillon Motor Speedway, and Greenville-Pickens Speedway and finish runner-up in the points.

In 2011, Poole formed his own race team driving the No. 7, and went on to score four wins at Hickory Motor Speedway, Kingsport, Rockingham Speedway, and Lonesome Pine. He clinched the championship at Rockingham after locking the championship up a week before at Concord Speedway.

=== ARCA Racing Series ===
==== 2011 ====
Poole made his ARCA Racing Series debut at Salem Speedway in 2011, driving the No. 55 Chevrolet for Venturini Motorsports, and won in his first start. He made three additional starts that season, earning one pole.

==== 2012 ====
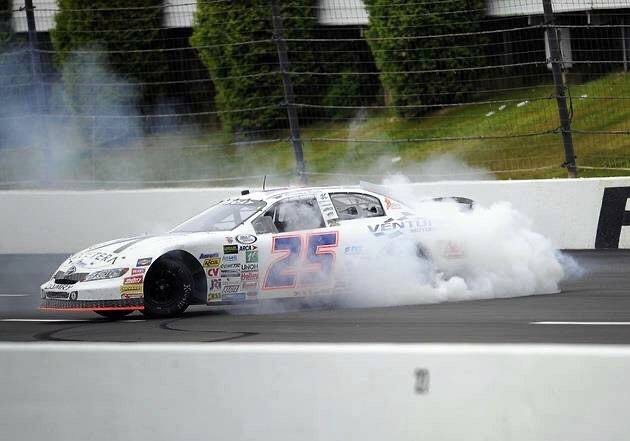
Poole after winning the 2012 Pocono ARCA 200

Poole ran the full 2012 schedule for Venturini in the No. 25 car, earning fifteen top-tens, three poles, and back-to-back wins at Elko Speedway and Pocono Raceway while going on to finish third in points.

==== 2013 ====
Poole ran part-time schedules over the next two years for Venturini. At the Illinois State Fairgrounds Racetrack, Poole crossed the finish line in third but was awarded the win after it was determined that the two drivers who finished ahead of him, Kelly Kovski and A. J. Fike, jumped the final restart.

==== 2014 ====
In 2014, Poole returned to Pocono Raceway, where he led 31 of 50 laps. He returned again for the next six races as a substitute for John Wes Townley; Poole scored four top fives and a victory at Kentucky Speedway in his final ARCA start in the No. 15. Poole was later penalized 25 driver points after his Kentucky car was found to be in violation of the minimum roof height rule.

==== 2015 ====
Poole signed a ten-race agreement with Team BCR Racing to drive the No. 45 Ford Fusion in 2015, replacing Grant Enfinger.

==== 2018 ====
Poole returned to Venturini at Pocono Raceway in 2018 as a relief driver for Natalie Decker, who was recovering from surgery.

=== O'Reilly Auto Parts Series ===
==== 2015 ====
In 2015, Poole was signed to drive in the Xfinity Series for HScott Motorsports with Chip Ganassi, with the operation being run out of Ganassi's NASCAR shop. Poole shared the No. 42 ride with Ganassi Sprint Cup Series driver Kyle Larson and Justin Marks. In between starts he also traveled to Sprint Cup races as an observer with Ganassi's other Cup driver, Jamie McMurray. On May 17, Poole was parked by NASCAR during the race at Iowa Speedway after intentionally turning J. J. Yeley into the outside wall in response to Yeley turning Poole into the wall earlier. In total, he scored two top tens and ten top-fifteen finishes during the season.

==== 2016 ====
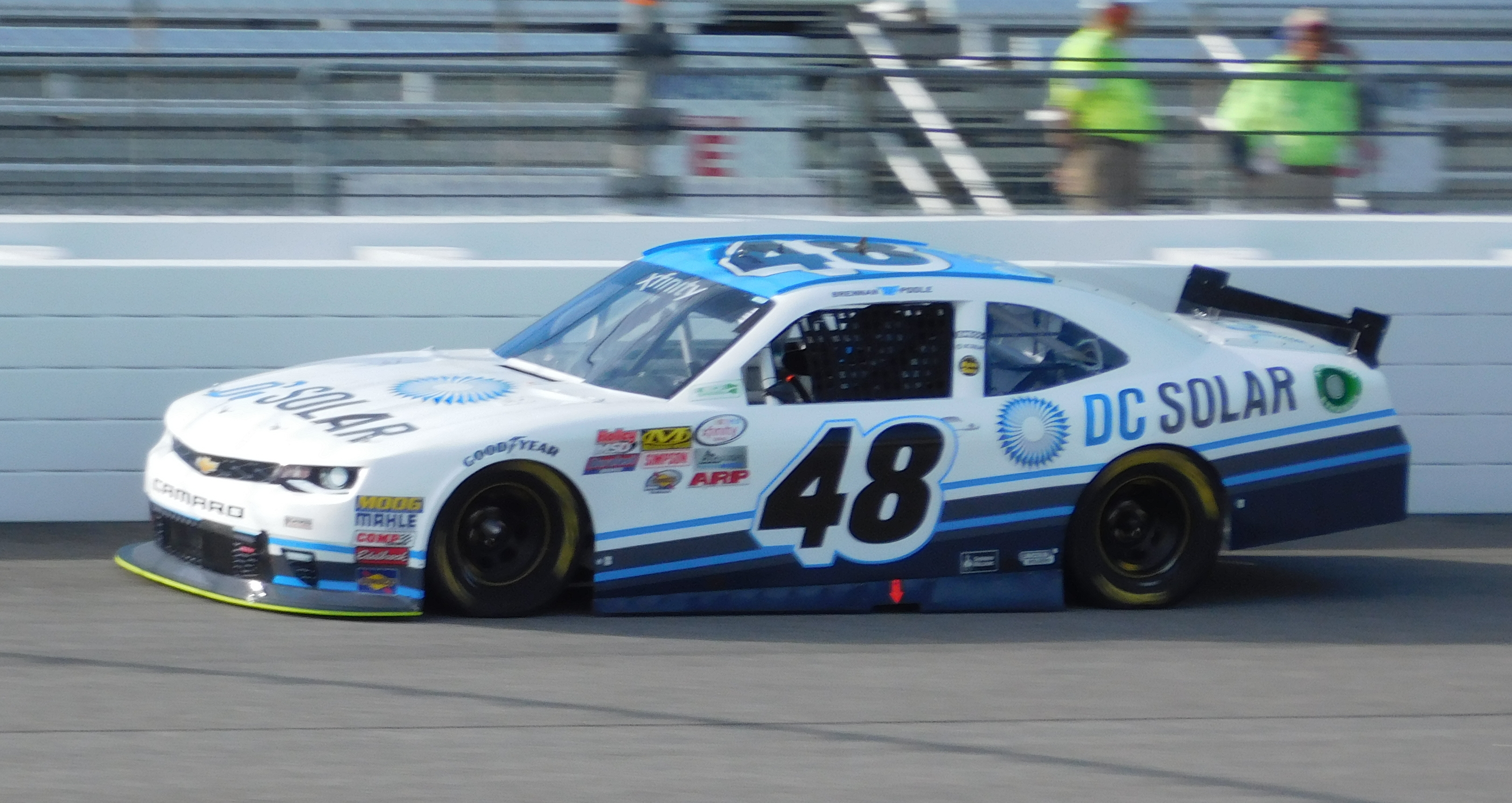
Poole during the 2016 ToyotaCare 250.

For 2016, Poole moved into a new No. 48 car for Ganassi full-time with sponsorship from DC Solar for the full season. At Talladega, Poole finished third after crossing the finish line first after a last-lap caution. NASCAR reviewed the finish and later awarded Elliott Sadler the win by virtue of being in first when the caution flag was displayed. Poole finished eighth in points with four top-five and seventeen top-ten finishes.

==== 2017 ====
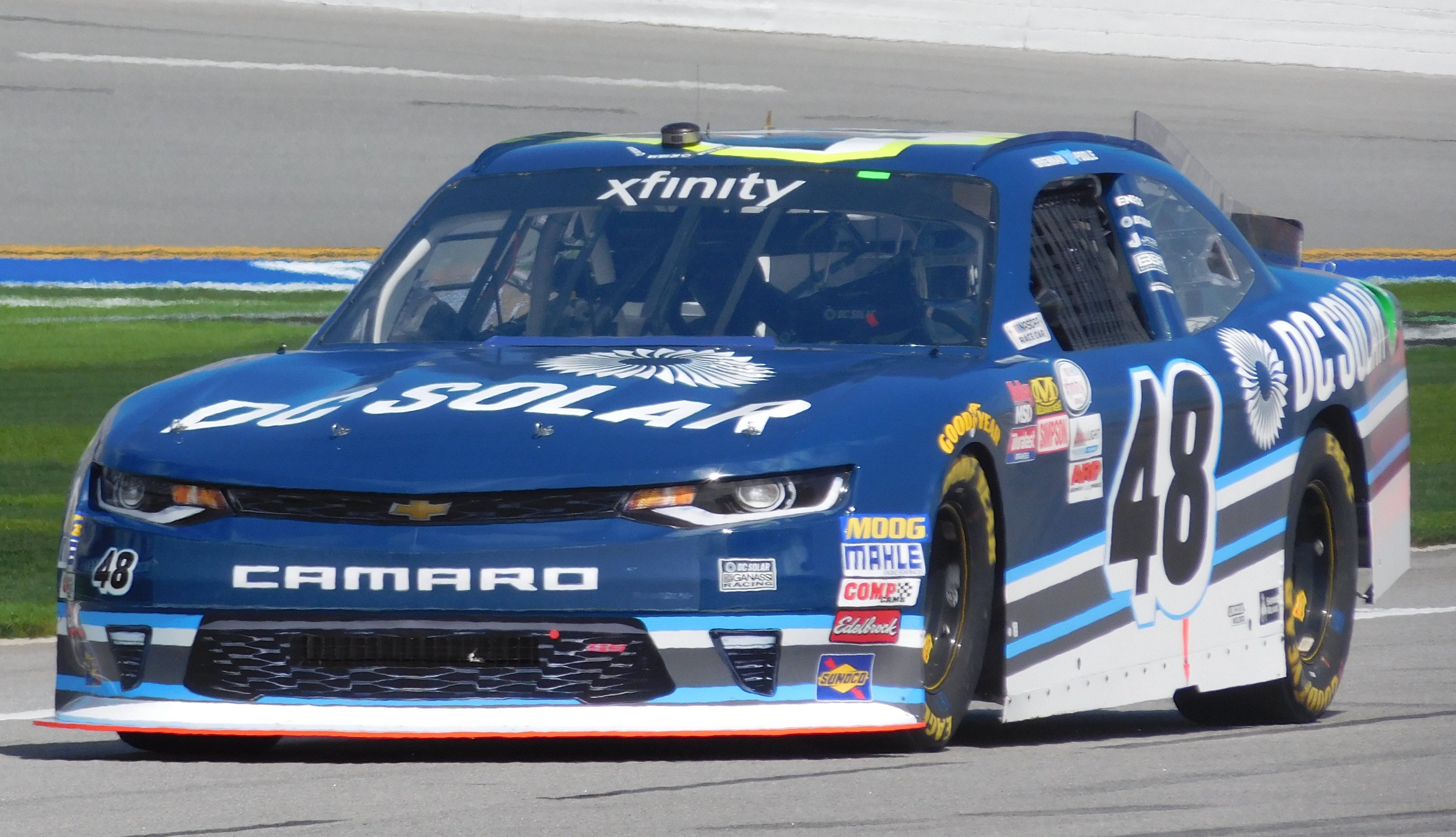
Poole during the 2017 PowerShares QQQ 300.

Poole returned to CGR's No. 48 for 2017. He won his first career series pole at Daytona International Speedway in July. Poole advanced to the Round of 8 in the Xfinity Series playoffs, but fell out of the elimination race early after contact with Caesar Bacarella. Poole finished sixth in the championship standings, with four top-five and seventeen top-ten finishes.

==== 2018 ====
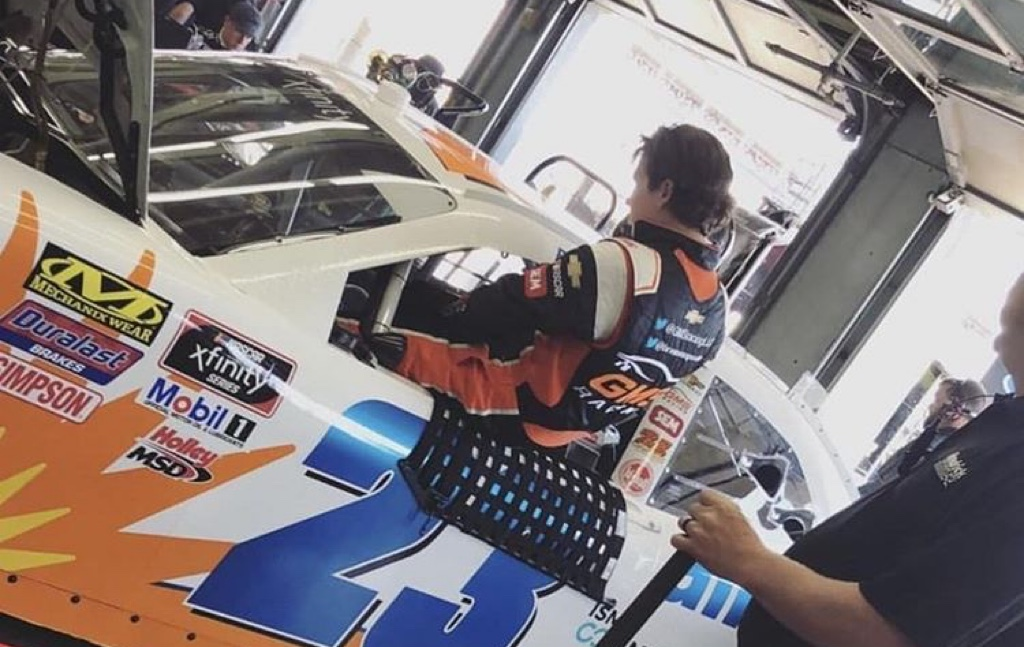
Poole during open practice for the NASCAR Xfinity Series in 2018.

Poole tested the No. 23 car for GMS Racing at Charlotte Motor Speedway in May 2018 during Spencer Gallagher's suspension, but did not make a series start that season.

On June 18, 2018, it was announced that Poole would sue Chip Ganassi Racing and agency Spire Sports + Entertainment for breach of contract, alleging that CGR and Spire conspired to take away DC Solar's sponsorship from Poole and move it to the No. 42 CGR Cup Series team and that Spire's involvement representing both driver and team constituted a conflict of interest. Ganassi and Spire both released statements through attorneys denying the claims, with CGR's statement saying the sponsorship of Poole ended "because he never won a race despite the advantages of the best equipment in the garage." Poole, CGR, and Spire would later settle their dispute out-of-court at the end of 2018 following DC Solar's FBI raid, although terms were not released.

==== 2022 ====
After five seasons away from the series, Poole returned in 2022. He made seven starts for Mike Harmon Racing and three for JD Motorsports, with a best finish of 14th at Homestead-Miami Speedway.

==== 2023 ====
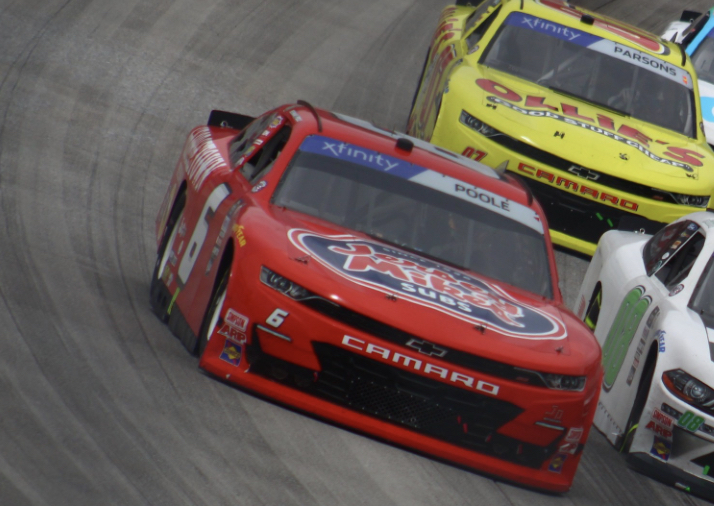
Poole during the 2023 A-GAME 200.

Poole joined JD Motorsports as its primary No. 6 driver for 2023. His best finish was fifth at Talladega Superspeedway, his first series top-five since 2017, and he finished 24th in the championship standings.

==== 2024 ====
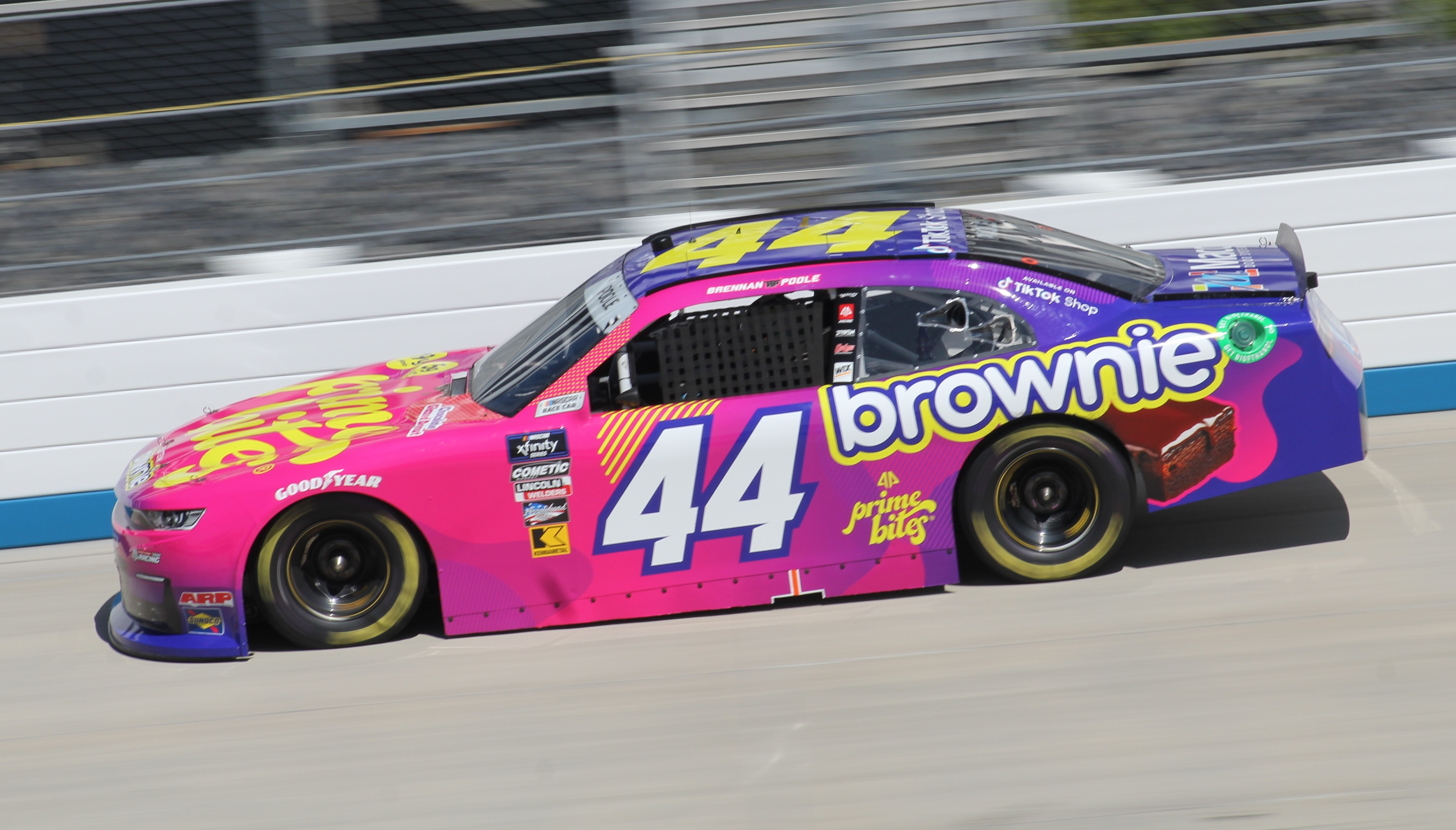
Poole's No. 44 car at Dover Motor Speedway in 2024.

Poole joined Alpha Prime Racing full-time in 2024, driving the No. 44 Chevrolet. At Talladega Superspeedway in April, he led coming off the final turn before finishing fifth, which tied Alpha Prime's best finish at the time. He finished 16th in points with one top-five and two top-ten finishes.

==== 2025 ====
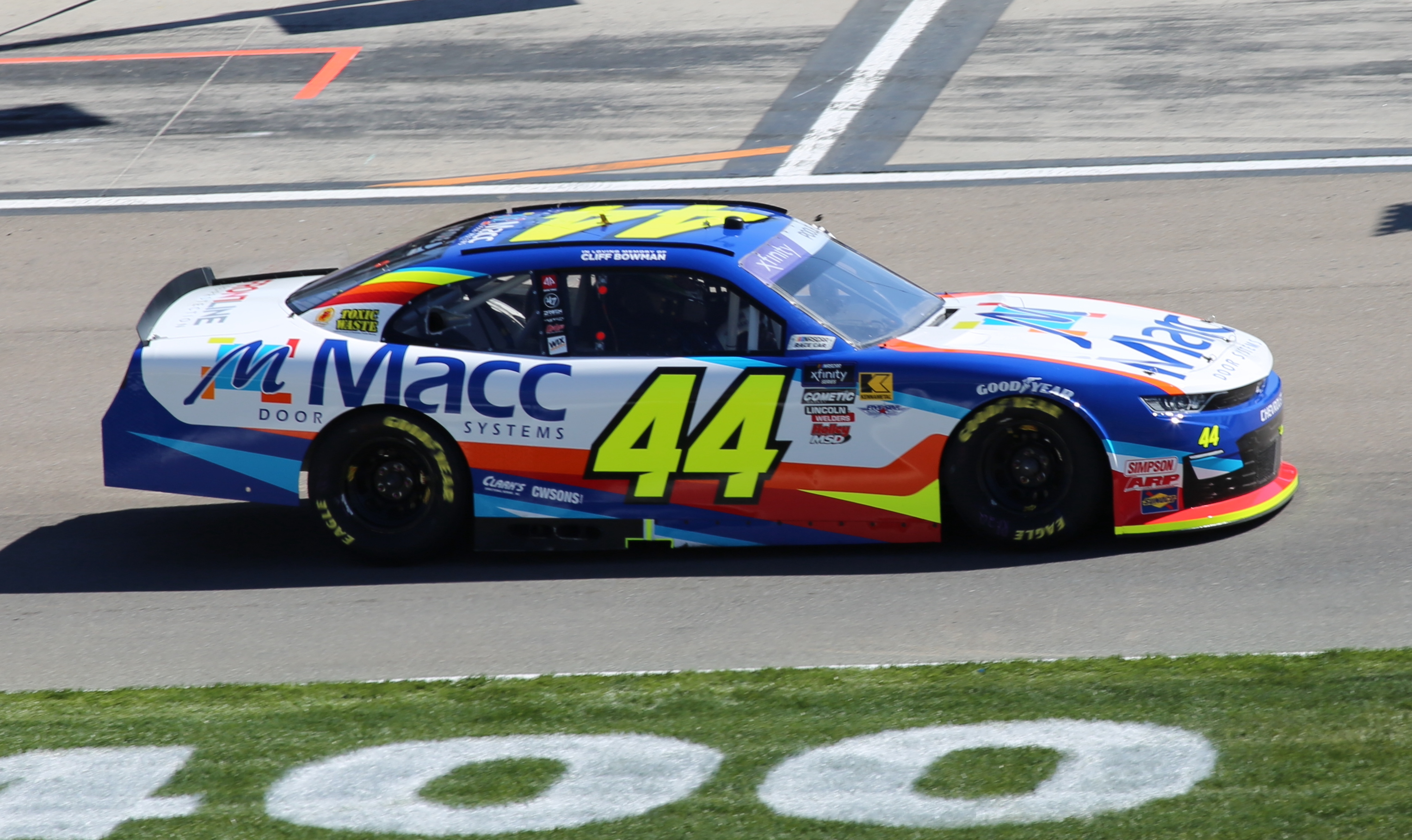
Poole's No. 44 car at Las Vegas Motor Speedway in 2025

Poole returned to Alpha Prime for the 2025 season. He finished fourth at Martinsville Speedway in March, earning eligibility for the next Dash 4 Cash event at Bristol Motor Speedway. Poole finished 19th in the season standings with two top-five and five top-ten finishes.

==== 2026 ====
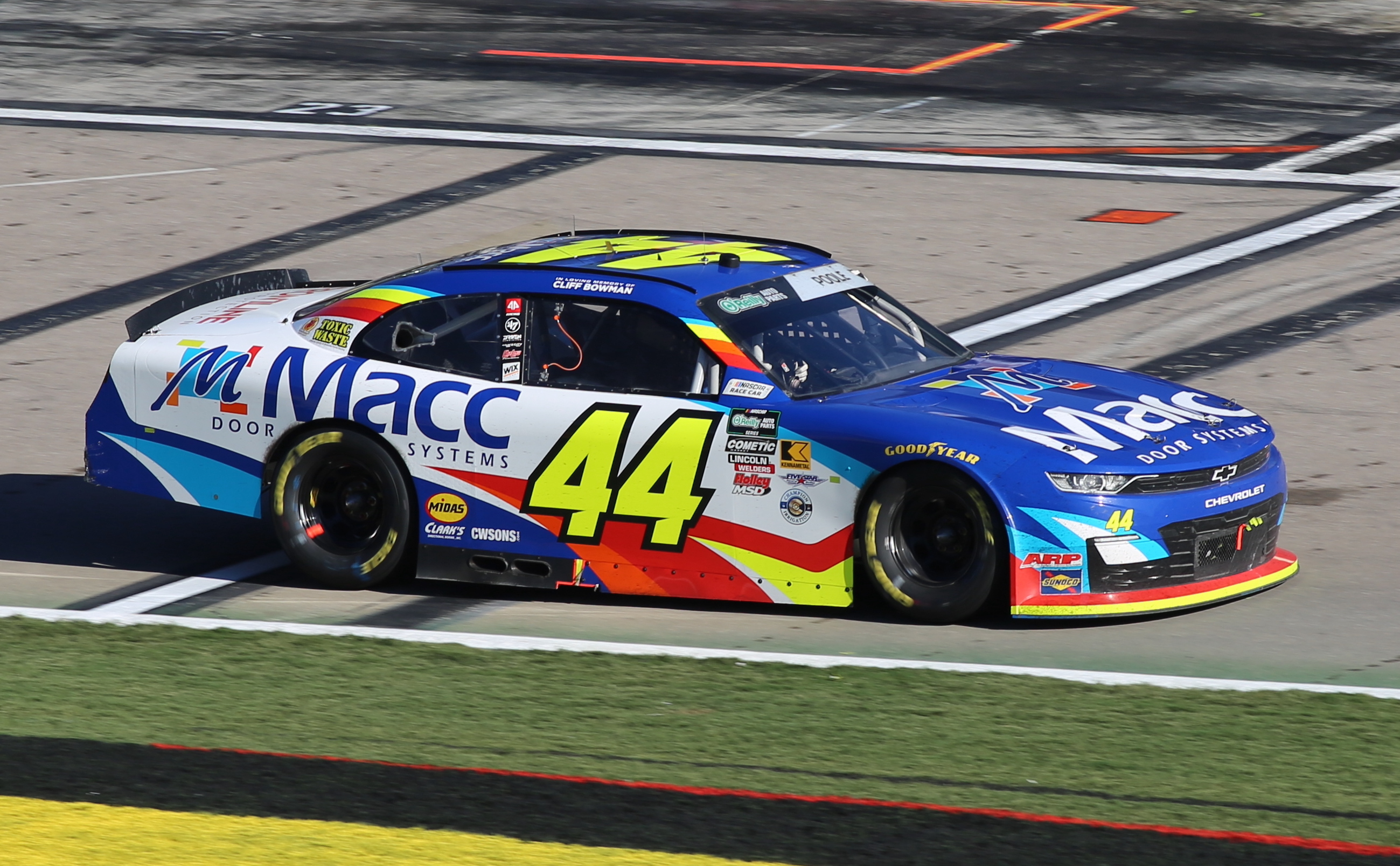
Poole's No. 44 car at Las Vegas Motor Speedway in 2026

Poole returned to Alpha Prime for a third consecutive full season in 2026. In the season opener at Daytona, Poole recovered from an early spin to finish 12th. In the July race at Atlanta Motor Speedway, Poole took the white flag in the lead but crashed while battling Nick Sanchez and Carson Kvapil, finishing 17th.

After scoring a top-ten at Charlotte, the next day on October 12, it was announced that Poole would not return to the team for 2027.

==== 2027 ====
On October 16, 2026, it was announced that Poole would drive the No. 31 full-time for Jordan Anderson Racing.

=== Craftsman Truck Series ===
==== 2015 ====
In 2015, Poole made his Truck Series debut at Las Vegas Motor Speedway, driving the No. 21 Chevrolet for GMS Racing, where he qualified fifteenth and finished eleventh.

==== 2018 ====
Poole made two starts for NextGen Motorsports in 2018, finishing 15th at Texas Motor Speedway and 19th at Homestead-Miami Speedway.

==== 2019 ====
On January 28, 2019, Poole announced a full-time schedule with On Point Motorsports for the 2019 NASCAR Gander Outdoors Truck Series, driving the No. 30. Poole finished in the top ten for the first time after avoiding late attrition at Texas Motor Speedway early in the season. The team later scaled back its effort due to sponsorship concerns.

After missing Kansas because of a lack of sponsorship, Poole and On Point returned at Charlotte. Poole was fastest in final practice, qualified seventeenth, and finished second to Kyle Busch despite mechanical problems during the race.

On July 11 at Kentucky Speedway, Ben Rhodes made contact with Poole while Rhodes was running second in the third and fourth turns. Both drivers acquired enough damage to make additional pit stops. After the race, Rhodes confronted Poole, saying that the contact had cost him a chance to win and secure a playoff berth.

==== 2020 ====
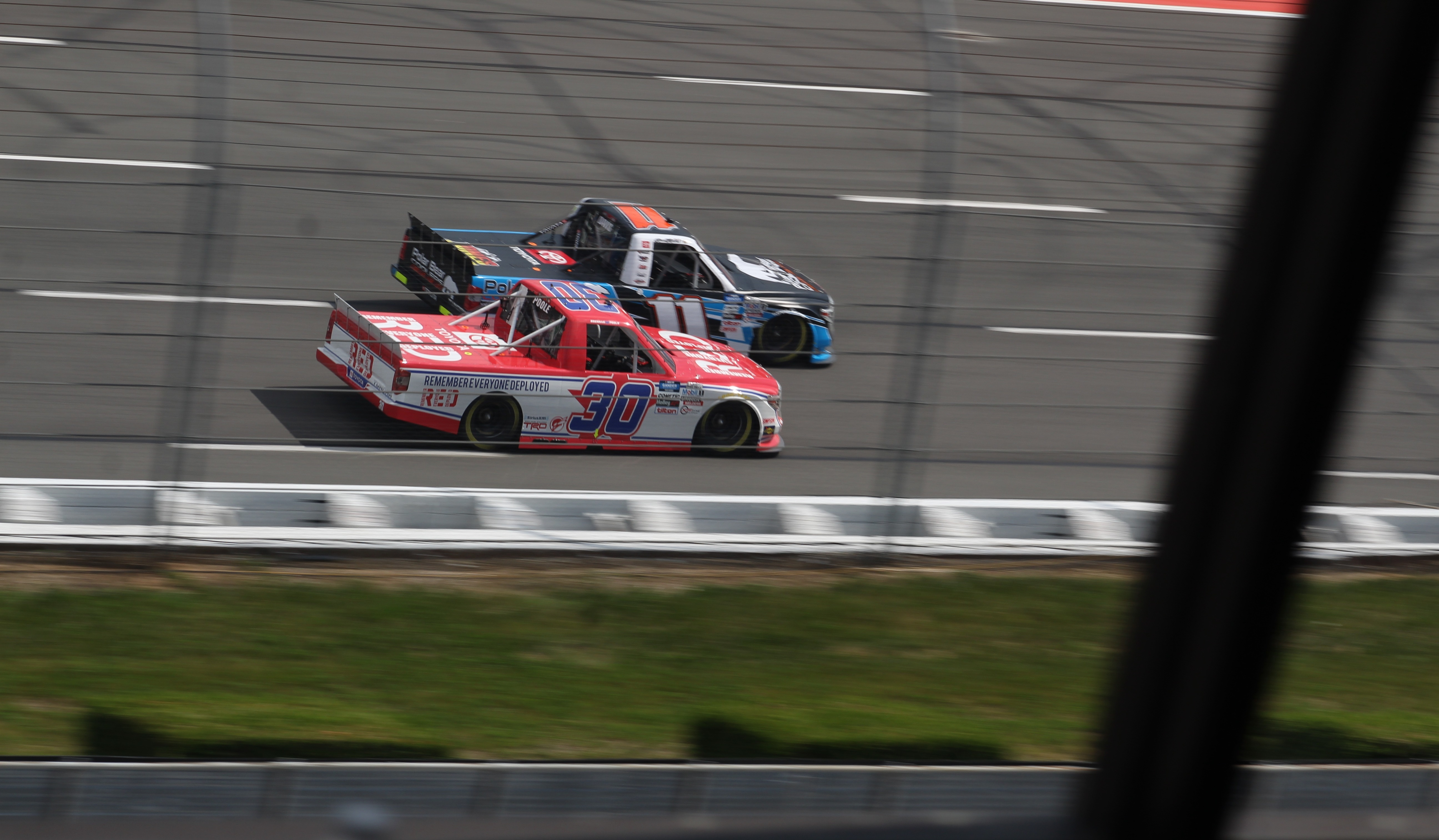
Poole at Pocono Raceway in 2020.

Although he moved to the Cup Series for the 2020 season, Poole continued racing in the Truck Series with On Point Motorsports on a part-time basis beginning at Daytona. He ran the first eleven races of the season, recording the best finish of twelfth in both Kansas Speedway doubleheader races in July.

Scott Lagasse Jr. and Danny Bohn took over the No. 30 after the Michigan International Speedway race in August as Poole had run out of eligible Truck races as a full-time Cup driver.

==== 2021 ====
In June 2021, Poole made his return to NASCAR and On Point Motorsports for the Truck race at Texas Motor Speedway.

==== 2022 ====
Poole made seven Truck Series starts for G2G Racing in 2022, driving the Nos. 46 and 47. His best finish was 24th at Homestead-Miami Speedway.

==== 2023 ====
Poole made three starts for G2G in 2023. His best finish was 20th at Kansas Speedway.

==== 2026 ====
On September 10, 2026, Spire Motorsports announced that Poole would drive its No. 7 Chevrolet at Kansas Speedway on September 26.

=== Cup Series ===
==== 2020 ====
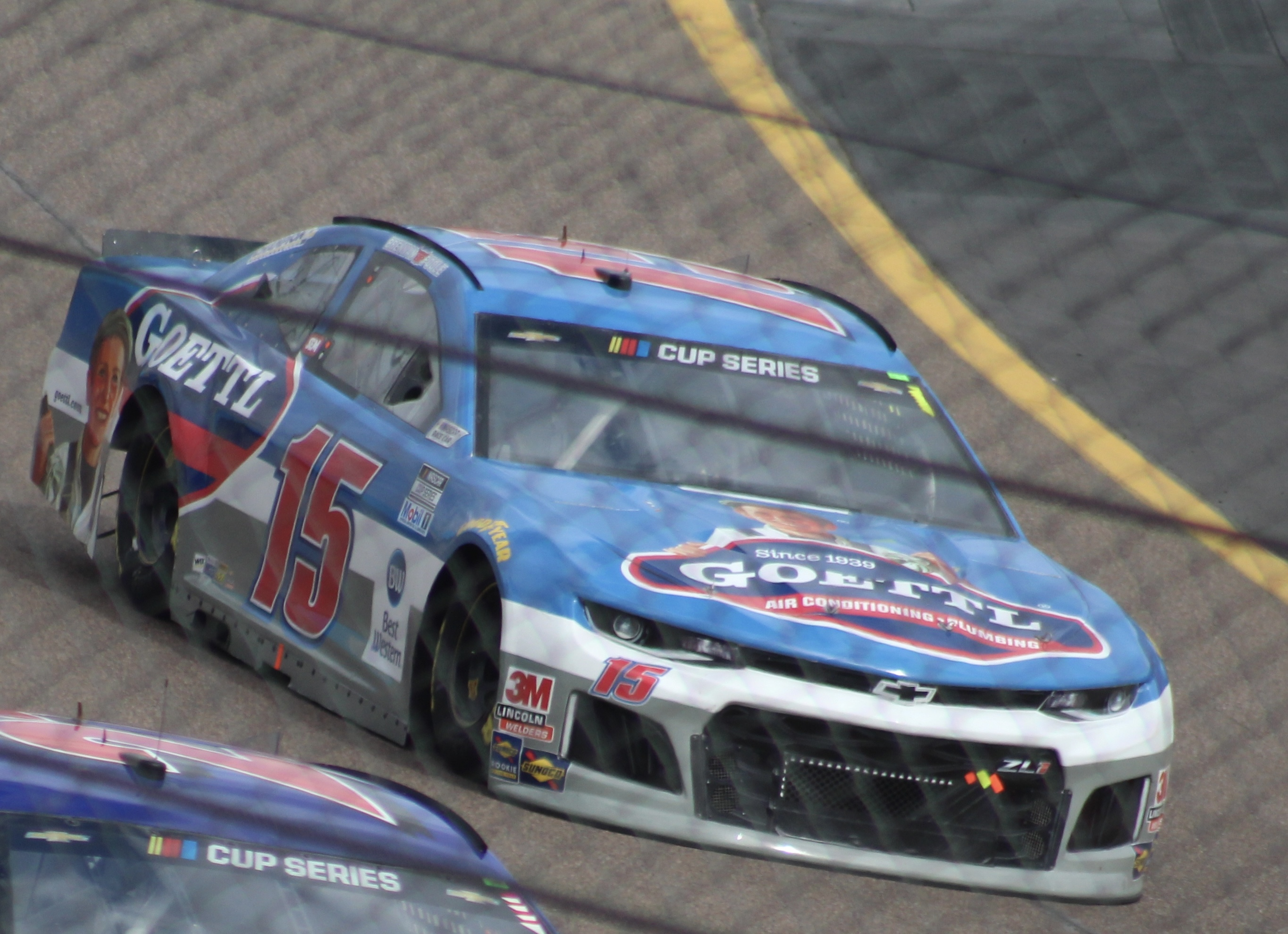
Poole at Phoenix Raceway in 2020.

On December 11, 2019, Poole announced he would race full-time for Premium Motorsports in the No. 15 in the NASCAR Cup Series for 2020.

On February 3, 2020, at the NASCAR Hall of Fame, Poole announced Spartan Mosquito Eradicators as a primary sponsor for 17 races, with R.E.D. as an associate sponsor.

In September, Poole was replaced by J. J. Yeley in the No. 15 for the Bass Pro Shops NRA Night Race due to sponsorship reasons, though he remained with the team. At the time, Poole was 32nd in points.

In the 2020 YellaWood 500 at Talladega Superspeedway on October 4, Poole earned his career-best Cup Series finish of ninth after post-race penalties were issued to Matt DiBenedetto and Chris Buescher.

==== 2023 ====
Poole returned to the Cup Series in 2023, driving the No. 15 for Rick Ware Racing at Dover Motor Speedway. During the race, contact from Ross Chastain sent Poole into the path of Kyle Larson; Poole finished 33rd. He made seven Cup starts for Rick Ware Racing that season.

==== 2025 ====
On June 16, 2025, it was announced that Poole would drive the No. 44 Chevrolet for NY Racing Team at Pocono Raceway.

=== Other racing ===
==== Asphalt modifieds ====
In July 2019, Poole made his asphalt modified debut at Bowman Gray Stadium for On Point Motorsports, finishing 24th after early plug-wire problems.

==== Late model stocks ====
On September 27, 2019, Poole made his first Late Model Stock appearance since his 2011 UARA-Stars championship, driving in the ValleyStar Credit Union 300 through a partnership between On Point Motorsports and DGR-Crosley. He finished fifteenth.

== Other ventures ==
Poole has been seen as a jack of all trades due to his ability to take roles of any form in the motorsports space, most prominently in his days with Venturini Motorsports in the ARCA Racing Series from 2013 to 2014 when he was left without a full-time ride after the 2012 season due to a lack of funding.

=== Consulting, coaching, spotting, and engineering ===
In his days with Venturini Motorsports from 2013 to 2014, Poole served as a consultant, driver coach, spotter, and engineer, scoring a few wins along the way with each of his roles, most notably spotting for Erik Jones' first and only ARCA Racing Series win at Berlin Raceway in 2013.

In 2023, Poole would spot at Flat Rock Speedway for the return to the seat of Billy Venturini, and the pairing would result in a fourth-place finish.

=== Dartfish camera operator ===
From 2011 to 2014, Poole served as a Dartfish camera operator for Richard Childress Racing’s NASCAR Camping World Truck Series, NASCAR Nationwide Series, and NASCAR Sprint Cup Series teams.

=== Vlogging ===
Poole ran a weekly vlog during the 2016 and 2017 seasons and resumed it during the 2020 season. He was the first driver in the NASCAR space and one of the first ever in the motorsports space to start doing a consistent vlog series and since then numerous drivers such as fellow NASCAR drivers Jimmie Johnson, Kyle Larson, and Aric Almirola, as well as the late Kyle Busch, have followed suit and started their own vlogging series in the following years.

=== Charity work ===
Poole participated in hurricane-relief efforts after Hurricane Harvey in 2017 through his "Poole for Texas" initiative and after Hurricane Florence in 2018.

In 2020, Poole, Premium Motorsports, and Children's Hospital of Orange County launched "Brennan's Miracle Mile", a fundraising initiative supporting the hospital's mental-health, intensive-care, and autism programs.

=== Music ===
Poole would produce and co-write several tracks for Yxngxr1 in 2024 and 2025.

== Personal life ==
Poole was born in Folsom, California, and moved with his family to The Woodlands, Texas, at age seven. He has said that the nickname "The Bull" came from a fan who saw him repeatedly charge from the back of the field.

Poole graduated from Woodlands Christian Academy a year early in 2008, at the age of seventeen.

== Motorsports career results ==
=== Racing career summary ===
Season	Series	Team	Races	Wins	Top 5	Top 10	Points	Position
2011	ARCA Racing Series	Venturini Motorsports	4	1	2	2	780	28th
2012	ARCA Racing Series	Venturini Motorsports	19	2	8	15	4735	**3rd**
2013	ARCA Racing Series	Venturini Motorsports	4	2	3	4	1065	26th
2014	ARCA Racing Series	Venturini Motorsports	7	1	4	6	1290	24th
2015	NASCAR Camping World Truck Series	GMS Racing	1	0	0	0	0	NC†
2015	NASCAR Xfinity Series	HScott Motorsports	17	0	0	2	433	23rd
2016	NASCAR Xfinity Series	Chip Ganassi Racing	33	0	4	17	2192	8th
2017	NASCAR Xfinity Series	Chip Ganassi Racing	33	0	4	17	2223	6th
2018	NASCAR Camping World Truck Series	NextGen Motorsports	2	0	0	0	43	49th
2019	NASCAR Gander Outdoors Truck Series	On Point Motorsports	13	0	1	4	300	18th
2020	NASCAR Gander Outdoors Truck Series	On Point Motorsports	11	0	0	0	0	NC†
2020	NASCAR Cup Series	Premium Motorsports	35	0	0	1	269	32nd
2021	NASCAR Camping World Truck Series	On Point Motorsports	1	0	0	0	35	54th
2022	NASCAR Camping World Truck Series	G2G Racing	7	0	0	0	21	53rd
2022	NASCAR Xfinity Series	Mike Harmon Racing	7	0	0	0	0	NC†
2022	NASCAR Xfinity Series	Jimmy Means Racing	0	0	0	0	0	NC†
2022	NASCAR Xfinity Series	JD Motorsports	3	0	0	0	0	NC†
2023	NASCAR Craftsman Truck Series	G2G Racing	3	0	0	0	0	NC†
2023	NASCAR Xfinity Series	JD Motorsports	31	0	1	1	366	24th
2023	NASCAR Cup Series	Rick Ware Racing	7	0	0	0	0	NC†
2024	NASCAR Xfinity Series	Alpha Prime Racing	33	0	1	2	572	16th
2025	NASCAR Xfinity Series	Alpha Prime Racing	33	0	2	5	608	19th
2025	NASCAR Cup Series	NY Racing Team	1	0	0	0	0	NC†
2026	NASCAR Craftsman Truck Series	Spire Motorsports	1	0	0	0	0	NC†
2026	NASCAR O'Reilly Auto Parts Series	Alpha Prime Racing	29	0	0	4	562*	17th*

^{*} – Season still in progress. ^{†} – Ineligible for series points.

=== NASCAR ===
(key) (Bold – Pole position awarded by qualifying time. Italics – Pole position earned by points standings or practice time. * – Most laps led.)

==== Cup Series ====
NASCAR Cup Series results
Year	Team	No.	Make	1	2	3	4	5	6	7	8	9	10	11	12	13	14	15	16	17	18	19	20	21	22	23	24	25	26	27	28	29	30	31	32	33	34	35	36	NCSC	Pts	Ref
2020	Premium Motorsports	15	Chevy	DAY; 16	LVS; 29	CAL; 32	PHO; 31	DAR; 27	DAR; 37	CLT; 30	CLT; 38	BRI; 24	ATL; 30	MAR; 30	HOM; 32	TAL; 35	POC; 29	POC; 27	IND; 35	KEN; 31	TEX; 27	KAN; 30	NHA; 27	MCH; 37	MCH; 30	DRC; 28	DOV; 36	DOV; 30	DAY; 15	DAR; 28	RCH; 33	BRI	LVS; 30	TAL; 9	ROV; 37	KAN; 28	TEX; 28	MAR; 37	PHO; 29	32nd	269	
2023	Rick Ware Racing	15	Ford	DAY	CAL	LVS	PHO	ATL	COA	RCH	BRD	MAR	TAL	DOV; 33	KAN; 28	DAR; 36	CLT	GTW	SON	NSH; 33	CSC	ATL	NHA	POC	RCH	MCH	IRC	GLN	DAY; 39	DAR	KAN	BRI	TEX	TAL; 30	ROV	LVS; 30	HOM	MAR	PHO	57th	0^{1}	
2025	NY Racing Team	44	Chevy	DAY	ATL	COA	PHO	LVS	HOM	MAR	DAR	BRI	TAL	TEX	KAN	CLT	NSH	MCH	MXC	POC; 34	ATL	CSC	SON	DOV	IND	IOW	GLN	RCH	DAY	DAR	GTW	BRI	NHA	KAN	ROV	LVS	TAL	MAR	PHO	58th	0^{1}	

===== Daytona 500 =====
Year	Team	Manufacturer	Start	Finish
2020	Premium Motorsports	Chevrolet	34	16

==== O'Reilly Auto Parts Series ====
NASCAR O'Reilly Auto Parts Series results
Year	Team	No.	Make	1	2	3	4	5	6	7	8	9	10	11	12	13	14	15	16	17	18	19	20	21	22	23	24	25	26	27	28	29	30	31	32	33	NOAPSC	Pts	Ref
2015	HScott Motorsports	42	Chevy	DAY	ATL	LVS; 9	PHO; 26	CAL	TEX; 13	BRI; 11	RCH; 13	TAL; 28	IOW; 38	CLT	DOV; 12	MCH	CHI; 17	DAY; 36	KEN; 12	NHA; 10	IND	IOW; 14	GLN	MOH	BRI	ROA	DAR	RCH; 11	CHI	KEN; 32	DOV	CLT; 21	KAN; 13	TEX	PHO	HOM	23rd	433	
2016	Chip Ganassi Racing	48	Chevy	DAY; 27	ATL; 14	LVS; 11	PHO; 10	CAL; 13	TEX; 19	BRI; 13	RCH; 10	TAL; 3	DOV; 10	CLT; 9	POC; 12	MCH; 11	IOW; 8	DAY; 26	KEN; 9	NHA; 6	IND; 11	IOW; 4	GLN; 10	MOH; 10	BRI; 28	ROA; 3	DAR; 5	RCH; 10	CHI; 21	KEN; 10	DOV; 15	CLT; 18	KAN; 7	TEX; 8	PHO; 11	HOM; 27	8th	2192	
2017	Chip Ganassi Racing	48	Chevy	DAY; 26	ATL; 11	LVS; 16	PHO; 8	CAL; 8	TEX; 37	BRI; 8	RCH; 22	TAL; 24	CLT; 8	DOV; 12	POC; 15	MCH; 11	IOW; 27	**DAY**; 7	KEN; 21	NHA; 10	IND; 7	IOW; 4	GLN; 17	MOH; 8	BRI; 6	ROA; 31	DAR; 6	RCH; 10	CHI; 11	KEN; 2	DOV; 5	CLT; 5	KAN; 12	TEX; 7	PHO; 38	HOM; 6	6th	2223	
2022	Mike Harmon Racing	47	Chevy	DAY	CAL; DNQ	LVS; 37	PHO; DNQ	ATL; DNQ	COA; DNQ	RCH; 38	MAR; 38	TAL	DOV; DNQ	DAR; DNQ	TEX; DNQ	CLT; 35	PIR	NSH; DNQ	ROA	ATL; 31	NHA	POC; DNQ	IRC	MCH; DNQ	GLN	DAY	DAR; 31	KAN; 37									94th	0^{1}	
2022	Jimmy Means Racing	52	Chevy																										BRI; DNQ			ROV; DNQ	LVS				94th	0^{1}	
2022	JD Motorsports	6	Chevy																											TEX; 31	TAL			HOM; 14	MAR	PHO; 29	94th	0^{1}	
2023	JD Motorsports	6	Chevy	DAY; 33	CAL; 25	LVS; 33	PHO; 29	ATL; 13	COA; 33	RCH; 34	MAR; 29	TAL; 5	DOV; 24	DAR; 23	CLT; 30	PIR; 38	SON; DNQ	NSH; 20	CSC; 26	ATL; 28	NHA; 24	POC; 29	ROA; 15	MCH; 29	IRC; 25	GLN; 12	DAY	DAR; 20	KAN; 28	BRI; 22	TEX; 34	ROV; 17	LVS; 25	HOM; 19	MAR; 32	PHO; 29	24th	366	
2024	Alpha Prime Racing	44	Chevy	DAY; 19	ATL; 20	LVS; 19	PHO; 20	COA; 15	RCH; 28	MAR; 14	TEX; 21	TAL; 5	DOV; 22	DAR; 20	CLT; 31	PIR; 16	SON; 14	IOW; 28	NHA; 16	NSH; 21	CSC; 20	POC; 26	IND; 21	MCH; 33	DAY; 16	DAR; 20	ATL; 15	GLN; 23	BRI; 17	KAN; 18	TAL; 9	ROV; 38	LVS; 21	HOM; 18	MAR; 13	PHO; 24	16th	572	
2025	Alpha Prime Racing	44	Chevy	DAY; 30	ATL; 17	COA; 20	PHO; 17	LVS; 22	HOM; 14	MAR; 4	DAR; 19	BRI; 36	CAR; 4	TAL; 19	TEX; 17	CLT; 22	NSH; 16	MXC; 38	POC; 16	ATL; 17	CSC; 10	SON; 22	DOV; 25	IND; 20	IOW; 20	GLN; 12	DAY; 9	PIR; 13	GTW; 14	BRI; 10	KAN; 28	ROV; 31	LVS; 25	TAL; 19	MAR; 36	PHO; 18	19th	608	
2026	Alpha Prime Racing	44	Chevy	DAY; 12	ATL; 19	COA; 10	PHO; 27	LVS; 20	DAR; 18	MAR; 14	CAR; 14	BRI; 18	KAN; 19	TAL; 15	TEX; 20	GLN; 18	DOV; 11	CLT; 27	NSH; 21	POC; 18	COR; 24	SON; 24	CHI; 25	ATL; 17	IND; 29	IOW; 10	DAY; 7	DAR; 15		BRI; 13		CLT; 10		TAL; 26	MAR; 20	HOM; 27	18th	605	
2026	Alpha Prime Racing	44	Ford																										GTW; 19		LVS; 17		PHO; 35				18th	605	
2027	Jordan Anderson Racing	31	Chevy	DAY	ATL	COA	PHO	LVS	DAR	BRI	MAR	TAL	TEX	DOV	NWS	CLT	NSS	POC	CHI	IOW	SON	IND	COR	BRI	GTW	DAY	DAR	RCH	GLN	KAN	LVS	CLT	PHO	TAL	MAR	HOM			

==== Craftsman Truck Series ====
NASCAR Craftsman Truck Series results
Year	Team	No.	Make	1	2	3	4	5	6	7	8	9	10	11	12	13	14	15	16	17	18	19	20	21	22	23	24	25	NCTC	Pts	Ref
2015	GMS Racing	21	Chevy	DAY	ATL	MAR	KAN	CLT	DOV	TEX	GTW	IOW	KEN	ELD	POC	MCH	BRI	MSP	CHI	NHA	LVS; 11	TAL	MAR	TEX	PHO	HOM			96th	0^{1}	
2018	NextGen Motorsports	35	Toyota	DAY	ATL	LVS	MAR	DOV	KAN	CLT	TEX	IOW	GTW	CHI	KEN	ELD	POC	MCH	BRI	MSP	LVS	TAL	MAR	TEX; 15	PHO	HOM; 19			49th	43	
2019	On Point Motorsports	30	Toyota	DAY; 24	ATL; 13	LVS; 20	MAR; 29	TEX; 9	DOV; 23	KAN	CLT; 2	TEX; 7	IOW; 11	GTW	CHI	KEN; 15	POC	ELD	MCH	BRI; 19	MSP	LVS; 6	TAL; 26	MAR	PHO	HOM			18th	300	
2020	On Point Motorsports	30	Toyota	DAY; 17	LVS; 15	CLT; 38	ATL; 17	HOM; 19	POC; 35	KEN; 17	TEX; 31	KAN; 12	KAN; 12	MCH; 35	DRC	DOV	GTW	DAR	RCH	BRI	LVS	TAL	KAN	TEX	MAR	PHO			85th	0^{1}	
2021	On Point Motorsports	30	Toyota	DAY	DRC	LVS	ATL	BRD	RCH	KAN	DAR	COA	CLT	TEX; 14	NSH	POC	KNX	GLN	GTW	DAR	BRI	LVS	TAL	MAR	PHO				54th	35	
2022	G2G Racing	46	Toyota	DAY	LVS; QL^{†}					DAR; 30	KAN	TEX; 23	CLT; 35	GTW; 34	SON	KNX	NSH	MOH	POC	IRP	RCH; DNQ	KAN; 34	BRI	TAL	HOM; 24	PHO			53rd	21	
2022	G2G Racing	47	Toyota			ATL; 28	COA	MAR	BRD																				53rd	21	
2023	G2G Racing	46	Toyota	DAY	LVS; 33	ATL	COA	TEX	BRD	MAR	KAN; 20	DAR; 36	NWS	CLT	GTW	NSH	MOH	POC	RCH	IRP	MLW	KAN	BRI	TAL	HOM	PHO			107th	0^{1}	
2026	Spire Motorsports	7	Chevy	DAY	ATL	STP	DAR	CAR	BRI	TEX	GLN	DOV	CLT	NSS	MCH	COR	LRP	NWS	IRP	RCH	NHA	BRI	KAN; 17	CLT	PHO	TAL	MAR	HOM	113th	0^{1}	
^{†} – Qualified but replaced by Matt Jaskol

^{*} Season still in progress
^{1} Ineligible for series points

=== ARCA Racing Series ===
(key) (Bold – Pole position awarded by qualifying time. Italics – Pole position earned by points standings or practice time. * – Most laps led.)

ARCA Racing Series results
Year	Team	No.	Make	1	2	3	4	5	6	7	8	9	10	11	12	13	14	15	16	17	18	19	20	21	ARSC	Pts	Ref
2011	Venturini Motorsports	55	Chevy	DAY	TAL	SLM; 1	TOL	NJE	CHI																28th	780	
2011	Venturini Motorsports	25	Toyota							**POC**; 5	MCH	WIN	BLN												28th	780	
2011	Venturini Motorsports	25	Chevy											IOW; 14	IRP	POC	ISF	MAD	DSF	SLM	KAN	TOL; 16			28th	780	
2012	Venturini Motorsports	25	Chevy	DAY; 7		SLM; 3	TAL; 8	TOL; 22	ELK; 1*			WIN; 2*		**IOW**; 28		IRP; 4		BLN; 9	ISF; 22		SLM; 8	DSF; C			3rd	4735	
2012	Venturini Motorsports	25	Toyota		MOB; 7					**POC**; 1*	MCH; 11*		NJE; 6		CHI; 2		**POC**; 2*			MAD; 10			KAN; 4		3rd	4735	
2013	Venturini Motorsports	15	Toyota	DAY	MOB	SLM	TAL	TOL	ELK	POC	MCH; 1	ROA								DSF; 4	IOW	SLM	KEN	KAN	26th	1065	
2013	Venturini Motorsports	55	Chevy										WIN; 3	CHI	NJE	POC	BLN								26th	1065	
2013	Venturini Motorsports	15	Chevy															ISF; 1*							26th	1065	
2013	Venturini Motorsports	55	Toyota																MAD; 9						26th	1065	
2014	Venturini Motorsports	15	Toyota	DAY	MOB	SLM	TAL	TOL	NJE	POC; QL^{†}	MCH	ELK	WIN	CHI	IRP		BLN; 3				SLM; 6	KEN; 1	KAN		24th	1290	
2014	Venturini Motorsports	66	Toyota													POC; 4*			MAD; 22						24th	1290	
2014	Venturini Motorsports	55	Toyota															ISF; 5		DSF; 6					24th	1290	
2018	Venturini Motorsports	25	Toyota	DAY	NSH	SLM	TAL	TOL	CLT	POC; QL^{‡}	MCH	MAD	GTW	CHI	IOW	ELK	POC	ISF	BLN	DSF	SLM	IRP	KAN		N/A	—	
^{†} – Qualified for John Wes Townley. ^{‡} – Qualified for Natalie Decker and also relieved her in the race.

== Production discography ==
=== EPs ===
- Orange Subaru — Yxngxr1 (2024)

=== Singles ===
- bored. — Yxngxr1 (2024)

Sporting positions
Preceded by Coleman Pressley	UARA-Stars Late Model Series Champion; 2011	Succeeded by Travis Swaim
Awards
Preceded by Bubba Wallace	UARA-Stars Late Model Series Rookie of the Year; 2009	Succeeded by Ronnie Bassett Jr.
