= 2020 Strat 200 =

Race details
- Race 2 of 23 in the 2020 NASCAR Gander RV & Outdoors Truck Series season
- Date: February 21, 2020
- Official name: Strat 200
- Location: Las Vegas Motor Speedway, Las Vegas, Nevada
- Course: Permanent racing facility
- Course length: 1.5 miles (2.414 km)
- Distance: 134 laps, 201 mi (323.478 km)

Pole position
Driver	Johnny Sauter	ThorSport Racing
- Time: 30.365

Most laps led
Driver	Kyle Busch	Kyle Busch Motorsports
- Laps: 108

Winner
No. 51	Kyle Busch	Kyle Busch Motorsports

Television in the United States
- Network: FS1
- Announcers: Vince Welch, Michael Waltrip, Erik Jones

The 2020 Strat 200 was the 2nd stock car race of the 2020 NASCAR Gander RV & Outdoors Truck Series season and the 24th iteration of the event. The race was held on February 21, 2020 at Las Vegas Motor Speedway in North Las Vegas, Nevada. Kyle Busch, driving for his own team Kyle Busch Motorsports, would win the event leading 108 laps, his first of the season and his 57th overall in the NASCAR Gander RV and Outdoors Truck Series. Johnny Sauter of ThorSport Racing and Austin Hill of Hattori Racing Enterprises would take 2nd and 3rd, respectively.

The layout of Las Vegas Motor Speedway, the venue where the race was held.

== Background ==
Las Vegas Motor Speedway, located in Clark County, Nevada outside the Las Vegas city limits and about 15 miles northeast of the Las Vegas Strip, is a 1,200-acre (490 ha) complex of multiple tracks for motorsports racing. The complex is owned by Speedway Motorsports, Inc., which is headquartered in Charlotte, North Carolina.

35 trucks would enter the race, meaning that three would not qualify for the race.

Entry list
#	Driver	Team	Make	Sponsor
00	Angela Ruch	Reaume Brothers Racing	Toyota	DWF Flooring & Carpets, COREtec "The Original"
2	Sheldon Creed	GMS Racing	Chevrolet	Chevrolet Accessories, Trench Shoring Company
02	Tate Fogleman	Young's Motorsports	Chevrolet	Solid Rock Carriers
3	Jordan Anderson	Jordan Anderson Racing	Chevrolet	Bommarito Automotive Group
4	Raphaël Lessard	Kyle Busch Motorsports	Toyota	Mobil 1
04	Cory Roper	Roper Racing	Ford	Carquest Auto Parts
7	Korbin Forrister	All Out Motorsports	Toyota	All Out Motorsports
9	Codie Rohrbaugh	CR7 Motorsports	Chevrolet	Grant County Mulch, CR7 Motorsports
10	Jennifer Jo Cobb	Jennifer Jo Cobb Racing	Chevrolet	Driven2Honor.org
11	Spencer Davis	Spencer Davis Motorsports	Toyota	Hearn Industrial Services
13	Johnny Sauter	ThorSport Racing	Ford	Tenda Heal
15	Tanner Gray	DGR-Crosley	Ford	Ford Performance
16	Austin Hill	Hattori Racing Enterprises	Toyota	United Rentals
18	Christian Eckes	Kyle Busch Motorsports	Toyota	Safelite Auto Glass
19	Derek Kraus	Bill McAnally Racing	Toyota	Eneos
20	Spencer Boyd	Young's Motorsports	Chevrolet	American Pavement Specialists
21	Zane Smith	GMS Racing	Chevrolet	The Cosmopolitan of Las Vegas
22	Austin Wayne Self	AM Racing	Chevrolet	JB Henderson Construction, GO TEXAN.
23	Brett Moffitt	GMS Racing	Chevrolet	Allegiant Air
26	Tyler Ankrum	GMS Racing	Chevrolet	LiUNA!
30	Brennan Poole	On Point Motorsports	Toyota	Remember Everyone Deployed
33	Josh Reaume	Reaume Brothers Racing	Toyota	Motorsports Safety Group
34	Josh Bilicki	Reaume Brothers Racing	Toyota	Reaume Brothers Racing
38	Todd Gilliland	Front Row Motorsports	Ford	Speedco
40	Ross Chastain	Niece Motorsports	Chevrolet	Niece Motorsports
44	Natalie Decker	Niece Motorsports	Chevrolet	REMarkable Pillow
45	Ty Majeski	Niece Motorsports	Chevrolet	IRacing
49	Bayley Currey	CMI Motorsports	Chevrolet	Springrates
51	Kyle Busch	Kyle Busch Motorsports	Toyota	Cessna, Beechcraft
52	Stewart Friesen	Halmar Friesen Racing	Toyota	Halmar
56	Timmy Hill	Hill Motorsports	Chevrolet	Hill Motorsports
83	Stefan Parsons	CMI Motorsports	Chevrolet	Springrates
88	Matt Crafton	ThorSport Racing	Ford	Menards, Hormel Black Label Bacon
98	Grant Enfinger	ThorSport Racing	Ford	Curb Records, Protect the Harvest
99	Ben Rhodes	ThorSport Racing	Ford	The Carolina Nut Co.
Official entry list

== Practice ==
The first and final practice took place on February 21, 2020. Christian Eckes would set the fastest time with a 30.363.

=== Final practice results ===
Top 3 results
Pos.	#	Driver	Team	Make	Time	Speed
1	18	Christian Eckes	Kyle Busch Motorsports	Toyota	30.363	177.848
2	13	Johnny Sauter	ThorSport Racing	Ford	30.396	177.655
3	23	Brett Moffitt	GMS Racing	Chevrolet	30.418	177.526
Full practice results

== Qualifying ==
Johnny Sauter of ThorSport Racing would win the pole with a 30.365 with an average speed of 177.836 miles per hour (286.199 km/h). The drivers of Josh Reaume, Natalie Decker, Spencer Boyd, Angela Ruch, and Josh Bilicki would all qualify by owner's points, with notable examples of Bilicki being almost 5 seconds slower than the slowest non-quaiflier, and Ruch being 3 seconds slower. Bayley Currey, Korbin Forrister, and Jennifer Jo Cobb would all not qualify for the race.

=== Angela Ruch and Parker Kilgerman argument on Twitter ===
Controversy would occur after qualifying, when Angela Ruch, driving for Reaume Brothers Racing, spun on the apron while going onto the track for her warmup lap. Driver and commentator Parker Kligerman would react to the spin on Twitter, saying "Let's raise the qualification standards for the top 3 series. Side note: I can't wait till a woman driver absolutely laps the field one day. Truly, we are the only sport men and women can compete on equal grounds. Can't wait till super talented women are throughout the field." In response, Angela would say on Twitter that she blew a tire during her lap in a swear-word fueled tirade, while also insulting Kilgerman by saying "Dip shit! I blew a tire! The deference between me and u little b:;$&&$ is I make my own path !! In fact if u do not shut your trap I will slap your little ass! Sad little fellas that no one dated in high school !" After harsh criticism to the tweet, Angela would say that the comment made on her Twitter was made by her husband, Mike Ruch, saying "Mike always has my back and I'm thankful for that! However I’ve decided to get him his own twitter so he can feel free to speak his mind 😳😂 Have fun everyone it's @mf_ruch @Twitter will never be the same! I'll keep my head down and keep digging! Thanks everyone!"

The original tweet Mike Ruch made is now deleted.

=== Full qualifying results ===
Pos.	#	Driver	Team	Make	Time	Speed
1	13	Johnny Sauter	ThorSport Racing	Ford	30.365	177.836
2	2	Sheldon Creed	GMS Racing	Chevrolet	30.398	177.643
3	51	Kyle Busch	Kyle Busch Motorsports	Toyota	30.460	177.282
4	18	Christian Eckes	Kyle Busch Motorsports	Toyota	30.476	177.189
5	45	Ty Majeski	Niece Motorsports	Chevrolet	30.476	177.189
6	16	Austin Hill	Hattori Racing Enterprises	Toyota	30.545	176.788
7	26	Tyler Ankrum	GMS Racing	Chevrolet	30.634	176.275
8	4	Raphaël Lessard	Kyle Busch Motorsports	Toyota	30.672	176.056
9	98	Grant Enfinger	ThorSport Racing	Ford	30.680	176.010
10	23	Brett Moffitt	GMS Racing	Chevrolet	30.701	175.890
11	56	Timmy Hill	Hill Motorsports	Chevrolet	30.736	175.690
12	40	Ross Chastain	Niece Motorsports	Chevrolet	30.739	175.673
13	88	Matt Crafton	ThorSport Racing	Ford	30.790	175.382
14	15	Tanner Gray	DGR-Crosley	Ford	30.794	175.359
15	21	Zane Smith	GMS Racing	Chevrolet	30.804	175.302
16	19	Derek Kraus	Bill McAnally Racing	Toyota	30.817	175.228
17	52	Stewart Friesen	Halmar Friesen Racing	Toyota	30.852	175.029
18	99	Ben Rhodes	ThorSport Racing	Ford	30.863	174.967
19	04	Cory Roper	Roper Racing	Ford	30.888	174.825
20	3	Jordan Anderson	Jordan Anderson Racing	Chevrolet	30.895	174.786
21	11	Spencer Davis	Spencer Davis Motorsports	Toyota	30.931	174.582
22	02	Tate Fogleman	Young's Motorsports	Chevrolet	30.952	174.464
23	30	Brennan Poole	On Point Motorsports	Toyota	30.959	174.424
24	83	Stefan Parsons	CMI Motorsports	Chevrolet	30.965	174.390
25	38	Todd Gilliland	Front Row Motorsports	Ford	30.977	174.323
26	22	Austin Wayne Self	AM Racing	Chevrolet	30.990	174.250
27	9	Codie Rohrbaugh	CR7 Motorsports	Chevrolet	30.993	174.233
Qualified by Owner's Points
28	33	Josh Reaume	Reaume Brothers Racing	Toyota	31.738	170.143
29	44	Natalie Decker	Niece Motorsports	Chevrolet	31.912	169.215
30	20	Spencer Boyd	Young's Motorsports	Chevrolet	32.777	164.750
31	00	Angela Ruch	Reaume Brothers Racing	Toyota	35.257	153.161
32	34	Josh Bilicki	Reaume Brothers Racing	Toyota	37.301	144.768
Failed to qualify
33	49	Bayley Currey	CMI Motorsports	Chevrolet	31.556	171.124
34	7	Korbin Forrister	All Out Motorsports	Toyota	31.675	170.481
35	10	Jennifer Jo Cobb	Jennifer Jo Cobb Racing	Chevrolet	32.413	166.600
Official starting lineup

== Race ==
=== Pre-race ceremonies ===
For pre-race ceremonies, the Nellis Air Force Base Honor Guard would present the nation's colors. Billy Maudin, chaplain from the Christian racing ministry Motor Racing Outreach would give out the invocation. Bridgette Foster would sing the national anthem. Kaui Kalahiki, Director of Facilities at The Strat, would give the starting command.

== Race results ==
Stage 1 Laps: 30

Fin	#	Driver	Team	Make	Pts
1	51	Kyle Busch	Kyle Busch Motorsports	Toyota	0
2	18	Christian Eckes	Kyle Busch Motorsports	Toyota	9
3	13	Johnny Sauter	ThorSport Racing	Ford	8
4	26	Tyler Ankrum	GMS Racing	Chevrolet	7
5	16	Austin Hill	Hattori Racing Enterprises	Toyota	6
6	4	Raphaël Lessard	Kyle Busch Motorsports	Toyota	5
7	40	Ross Chastain	Niece Motorsports	Chevrolet	0
8	23	Brett Moffitt	GMS Racing	Chevrolet	3
9	99	Ben Rhodes	ThorSport Racing	Ford	2
10	2	Sheldon Creed	GMS Racing	Chevrolet	1

Stage 2 Laps: 30

Fin	#	Driver	Team	Make	Pts
1	51	Kyle Busch	Kyle Busch Motorsports	Toyota	0
2	18	Christian Eckes	Kyle Busch Motorsports	Toyota	9
3	40	Ross Chastain	Niece Motorsports	Chevrolet	0
4	98	Grant Enfinger	ThorSport Racing	Ford	7
5	88	Matt Crafton	ThorSport Racing	Ford	6
6	99	Ben Rhodes	ThorSport Racing	Ford	5
7	23	Brett Moffitt	GMS Racing	Chevrolet	4
8	4	Raphaël Lessard	Kyle Busch Motorsports	Toyota	3
9	38	Todd Gilliland	Front Row Motorsports	Ford	2
10	13	Johnny Sauter	ThorSport Racing	Ford	1

Stage 3 Laps: 74

Fin	St	#	Driver	Team	Make	Laps	Led	Status	Pts
1	3	51	Kyle Busch	Kyle Busch Motorsports	Toyota	134	108	running	0
2	1	13	Johnny Sauter	ThorSport Racing	Ford	134	7	running	34
3	6	16	Austin Hill	Hattori Racing Enterprises	Toyota	134	0	running	40
4	13	88	Matt Crafton	ThorSport Racing	Ford	134	0	running	29
5	18	99	Ben Rhodes	ThorSport Racing	Ford	134	0	running	39
6	15	21	Zane Smith	GMS Racing	Chevrolet	134	0	running	31
7	25	38	Todd Gilliland	Front Row Motorsports	Ford	134	0	running	32
8	14	15	Tanner Gray	DGR-Crosley	Ford	134	0	running	29
9	17	52	Stewart Friesen	Halmar Friesen Racing	Toyota	134	0	running	28
10	2	2	Sheldon Creed	GMS Racing	Chevrolet	134	8	running	28
11	7	26	Tyler Ankrum	GMS Racing	Chevrolet	134	0	running	23
12	21	11	Spencer Davis	Spencer Davis Motorsports	Toyota	134	0	running	25
13	5	45	Ty Majeski	Niece Motorsports	Chevrolet	134	0	running	24
14	12	40	Ross Chastain	Niece Motorsports	Chevrolet	134	0	running	0
15	23	30	Brennan Poole	On Point Motorsports	Toyota	134	0	running	0
16	10	23	Brett Moffitt	GMS Racing	Chevrolet	134	0	running	28
17	26	22	Austin Wayne Self	AM Racing	Chevrolet	134	0	running	20
18	27	9	Codie Rohrbaugh	CR7 Motorsports	Chevrolet	134	0	running	19
19	22	02	Tate Fogleman	Young's Motorsports	Chevrolet	133	0	running	18
20	20	3	Jordan Anderson	Jordan Anderson Racing	Chevrolet	132	1	running	17
21	29	44	Natalie Decker	Niece Motorsports	Chevrolet	132	0	running	16
22	16	19	Derek Kraus	Bill McAnally Racing	Toyota	131	0	running	15
23	4	18	Christian Eckes	Kyle Busch Motorsports	Toyota	130	10	running	32
24	31	00	Angela Ruch	Reaume Brothers Racing	Toyota	130	0	running	13
25	30	20	Spencer Boyd	Young's Motorsports	Chevrolet	129	0	running	12
26	19	04	Cory Roper	Roper Racing	Ford	128	0	running	11
27	28	33	Josh Reaume	Reaume Brothers Racing	Toyota	126	0	running	10
28	11	56	Timmy Hill	Hill Motorsports	Chevrolet	113	0	overheating	9
29	24	83	Stefan Parsons	CMI Motorsports	Chevrolet	112	0	running	8
30	8	4	Raphaël Lessard	Kyle Busch Motorsports	Toyota	90	0	crash	15
31	9	98	Grant Enfinger	ThorSport Racing	Ford	89	0	crash	3
32	32	34	Josh Bilicki	Reaume Brothers Racing	Toyota	3	0	handling	0
Failed to qualify
33		49	Bayley Currey	CMI Motorsports	Chevrolet				
34		7	Korbin Forrister	All Out Motorsports	Toyota				
35		10	Jennifer Jo Cobb	Jennifer Jo Cobb Racing	Chevrolet				
Official race results

Previous race: 2020 NextEra Energy 250	NASCAR Gander RV & Outdoors Truck Series; 2020 season	Next race: 2020 North Carolina Education Lottery 200
