= 2025 The Great American Getaway 400 =

NASCAR Cup Series race

2025 The Great American Getaway 400 presented by VISITPA
Race details
- Race 17 of 36 in the 2025 NASCAR Cup Series
- Date: June 22, 2025
- Location: Pocono Raceway in Long Pond, Pennsylvania
- Course: Permanent racing facility
- Course length: 2.5 miles (4.0 km)
- Distance: 160 laps, 400 mi (643.738 km)
- Average speed: 130.199 miles per hour (209.535 km/h)

Pole position
Driver	Denny Hamlin	Joe Gibbs Racing
- Time: 52.144

Most laps led
Driver	Chase Briscoe	Joe Gibbs Racing
- Laps: 72

Fastest lap
Driver	Denny Hamlin	Joe Gibbs Racing
- Time: 52.592

Winner
No. 19	Chase Briscoe	Joe Gibbs Racing

Television in the United States
- Network: Prime Video
- Announcers: Adam Alexander, Dale Earnhardt Jr., and Steve Letarte
- Nielsen ratings: 1.869 million

Radio in the United States
- Radio: MRN
- Booth announcers: Mike Bagley and Kurt Becker
- Turn announcers: Dave Moody (1), Tim Catalfamo (2), Nathan Prouty (3)

The 2025 The Great American Getaway presented by VISITPA was a NASCAR Cup Series race held on June 22, 2025, at Pocono Raceway in Long Pond, Pennsylvania. Contested over 160 laps on the 2.5-mile (4.0 km) oval, it was the 17th race of the 2025 NASCAR Cup Series season and the third and final seeding race for the inaugural NASCAR In-Season Challenge.

Chase Briscoe won the race. Denny Hamlin finished 2nd, and Ryan Blaney finished 3rd. Chris Buescher and Chase Elliott rounded out the top five, and John Hunter Nemechek, Kyle Larson, Ryan Preece, Brad Keselowski, and Austin Cindric rounded out the top ten.

== Report ==
=== Background ===
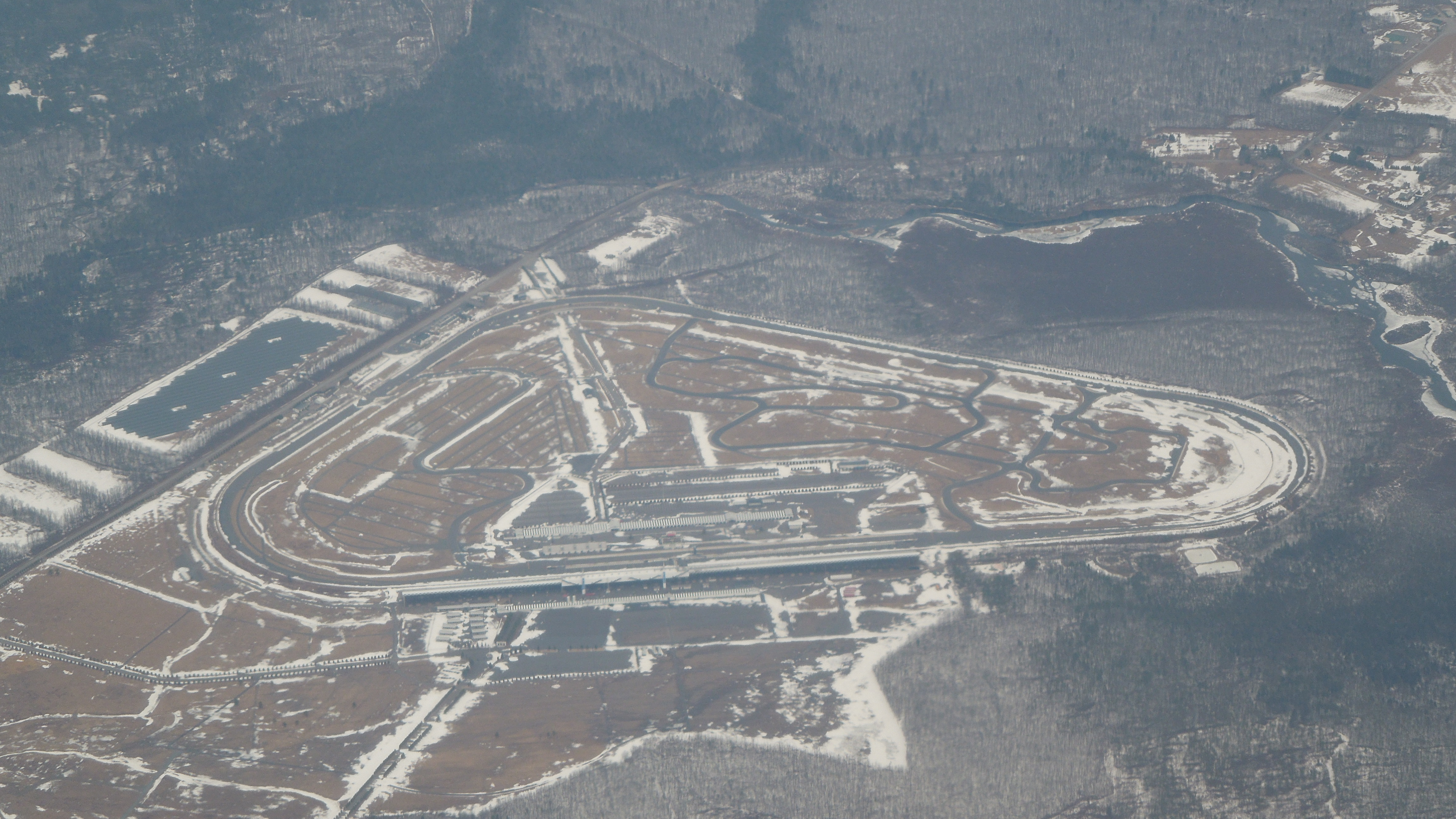
Pocono Raceway, the track where the race was held.

Pocono Raceway is a 2.5-mile (4.0 km) oval speedway located in Long Pond, Pennsylvania, which has hosted NASCAR racing annually since the early 1970s. Nicknamed "The Tricky Triangle", the speedway has three distinct corners and is known for high speeds along its lengthy straightaways.

From 1982 to 2019, the circuit had two race weekends. In 2020, the circuit was reduced to one race meeting of two races. The first race was moved to World Wide Technology Raceway near St. Louis starting in 2022.

==== Entry list ====
- (R) denotes rookie driver.
- (i) denotes driver who is ineligible for series driver points.

No.	Driver	Team	Manufacturer
1	Ross Chastain	Trackhouse Racing	Chevrolet
2	Austin Cindric	Team Penske	Ford
3	Austin Dillon	Richard Childress Racing	Chevrolet
4	Noah Gragson	Front Row Motorsports	Ford
5	Kyle Larson	Hendrick Motorsports	Chevrolet
6	Brad Keselowski	RFK Racing	Ford
7	Justin Haley	Spire Motorsports	Chevrolet
8	Kyle Busch	Richard Childress Racing	Chevrolet
9	Chase Elliott	Hendrick Motorsports	Chevrolet
10	Ty Dillon	Kaulig Racing	Chevrolet
11	Denny Hamlin	Joe Gibbs Racing	Toyota
12	Ryan Blaney	Team Penske	Ford
16	A. J. Allmendinger	Kaulig Racing	Chevrolet
17	Chris Buescher	RFK Racing	Ford
19	Chase Briscoe	Joe Gibbs Racing	Toyota
20	Christopher Bell	Joe Gibbs Racing	Toyota
21	Josh Berry	Wood Brothers Racing	Ford
22	Joey Logano	Team Penske	Ford
23	Bubba Wallace	23XI Racing	Toyota
24	William Byron	Hendrick Motorsports	Chevrolet
34	Todd Gilliland	Front Row Motorsports	Ford
35	Riley Herbst (R)	23XI Racing	Toyota
38	Zane Smith	Front Row Motorsports	Ford
41	Cole Custer	Haas Factory Team	Ford
42	John Hunter Nemechek	Legacy Motor Club	Toyota
43	Erik Jones	Legacy Motor Club	Toyota
44	Brennan Poole (i)	NY Racing Team	Chevrolet
45	Tyler Reddick	23XI Racing	Toyota
47	Ricky Stenhouse Jr.	Hyak Motorsports	Chevrolet
48	Alex Bowman	Hendrick Motorsports	Chevrolet
51	Cody Ware	Rick Ware Racing	Ford
54	Ty Gibbs	Joe Gibbs Racing	Toyota
60	Ryan Preece	RFK Racing	Ford
71	Michael McDowell	Spire Motorsports	Chevrolet
77	Carson Hocevar	Spire Motorsports	Chevrolet
88	Shane van Gisbergen (R)	Trackhouse Racing	Chevrolet
99	Daniel Suárez	Trackhouse Racing	Chevrolet
Official entry list

== Practice ==
William Byron was the fastest in the practice session with a time of 52.706 seconds and a speed of 170.758 mph (274.808 km/h).

=== Practice results ===
Pos	No.	Driver	Team	Manufacturer	Time	Speed
1	24	William Byron	Hendrick Motorsports	Chevrolet	52.706	170.758
2	23	Bubba Wallace	23XI Racing	Toyota	52.931	170.033
3	9	Chase Elliott	Hendrick Motorsports	Chevrolet	52.977	169.885
Official practice results

== Qualifying ==
Denny Hamlin scored the pole for the race with a time of 52.144 and a speed of 172.599 mph (277.771 km/h).

=== Qualifying results ===
Pos	No.	Driver	Team	Manufacturer	Time	Speed
1	11	Denny Hamlin	Joe Gibbs Racing	Toyota	52.144	172.599
2	17	Chris Buescher	RFK Racing	Ford	52.227	172.325
3	77	Carson Hocevar	Spire Motorsports	Chevrolet	52.379	171.825
4	42	John Hunter Nemechek	Legacy Motor Club	Toyota	52.390	171.789
5	41	Cole Custer	Haas Factory Team	Ford	52.436	171.638
6	19	Chase Briscoe	Joe Gibbs Racing	Toyota	52.444	171.612
7	54	Ty Gibbs	Joe Gibbs Racing	Toyota	52.464	171.546
8	45	Tyler Reddick	23XI Racing	Toyota	52.500	171.429
9	20	Christopher Bell	Joe Gibbs Racing	Toyota	52.525	171.347
10	99	Daniel Suárez	Trackhouse Racing	Chevrolet	52.631	171.002
11	43	Erik Jones	Legacy Motor Club	Toyota	52.632	170.999
12	22	Joey Logano	Team Penske	Ford	52.673	170.866
13	60	Ryan Preece	RFK Racing	Ford	52.727	170.691
14	6	Brad Keselowski	RFK Racing	Ford	52.781	170.516
15	38	Zane Smith	Front Row Motorsports	Ford	52.803	170.445
16	3	Austin Dillon	Richard Childress Racing	Chevrolet	52.811	170.419
17	4	Noah Gragson	Front Row Motorsports	Ford	52.813	170.413
18	9	Chase Elliott	Hendrick Motorsports	Chevrolet	52.820	170.390
19	2	Austin Cindric	Team Penske	Ford	52.836	170.338
20	12	Ryan Blaney	Team Penske	Ford	52.837	170.335
21	1	Ross Chastain	Trackhouse Racing	Chevrolet	52.861	170.258
22	7	Justin Haley	Spire Motorsports	Chevrolet	52.927	170.046
23	88	Shane van Gisbergen (R)	Trackhouse Racing	Chevrolet	52.962	169.933
24	5	Kyle Larson	Hendrick Motorsports	Chevrolet	52.966	169.920
25	48	Alex Bowman	Hendrick Motorsports	Chevrolet	52.978	169.882
26	8	Kyle Busch	Richard Childress Racing	Chevrolet	53.095	169.507
27	10	Ty Dillon	Kaulig Racing	Chevrolet	53.107	169.469
28	71	Michael McDowell	Spire Motorsports	Chevrolet	53.140	169.364
29	35	Riley Herbst (R)	23XI Racing	Toyota	53.159	169.303
30	47	Ricky Stenhouse Jr.	Hyak Motorsports	Chevrolet	53.661	167.720
31	24	William Byron	Hendrick Motorsports	Chevrolet	57.645	156.128
32	34	Todd Gilliland	Front Row Motorsports	Ford	59.181	152.076
33	16	A. J. Allmendinger	Kaulig Racing	Chevrolet	64.077	140.456
34	23	Bubba Wallace	23XI Racing	Toyota	0.000	0.000
35	21	Josh Berry	Wood Brothers Racing	Ford	0.000	0.000
36	51	Cody Ware	Rick Ware Racing	Ford	0.000	0.000
37	44	Brennan Poole (i)	NY Racing Team	Chevrolet	0.000	0.000
Official qualifying results

== Race ==
The start of the race was delayed 2 1/2 hours from its originally scheduled start due to a rain delay.

=== Race results ===
==== Stage results ====
Stage One Laps: 30

Pos	No	Driver	Team	Manufacturer	Points
1	11	Denny Hamlin	Joe Gibbs Racing	Toyota	10
2	17	Chris Buescher	RFK Racing	Ford	9
3	45	Tyler Reddick	23XI Racing	Toyota	8
4	19	Chase Briscoe	Joe Gibbs Racing	Toyota	7
5	43	Erik Jones	Legacy Motor Club	Toyota	6
6	38	Zane Smith	Front Row Motorsports	Ford	5
7	22	Joey Logano	Team Penske	Ford	4
8	9	Chase Elliott	Hendrick Motorsports	Chevrolet	3
9	24	William Byron	Hendrick Motorsports	Chevrolet	2
10	48	Alex Bowman	Hendrick Motorsports	Chevrolet	1
Official stage one results

Stage Two Laps: 65

Pos	No	Driver	Team	Manufacturer	Points
1	19	Chase Briscoe	Joe Gibbs Racing	Toyota	10
2	21	Josh Berry	Wood Brothers Racing	Ford	9
3	9	Chase Elliott	Hendrick Motorsports	Chevrolet	8
4	24	William Byron	Hendrick Motorsports	Chevrolet	7
5	17	Chris Buescher	RFK Racing	Ford	6
6	11	Denny Hamlin	Joe Gibbs Racing	Toyota	5
7	2	Austin Cindric	Team Penske	Ford	4
8	12	Ryan Blaney	Team Penske	Ford	3
9	5	Kyle Larson	Hendrick Motorsports	Chevrolet	2
10	77	Carson Hocevar	Spire Motorsports	Chevrolet	1
Official stage two results

=== Final Stage results ===
Stage Three Laps: 65

Pos	Grid	No	Driver	Team	Manufacturer	Laps	Points
1	6	19	Chase Briscoe	Joe Gibbs Racing	Toyota	160	57
2	1	11	Denny Hamlin	Joe Gibbs Racing	Toyota	160	51
3	20	12	Ryan Blaney	Team Penske	Ford	160	37
4	2	17	Chris Buescher	RFK Racing	Ford	160	48
5	18	9	Chase Elliott	Hendrick Motorsports	Chevrolet	160	43
6	4	42	John Hunter Nemechek	Legacy Motor Club	Toyota	160	31
7	24	5	Kyle Larson	Hendrick Motorsports	Chevrolet	160	32
8	13	60	Ryan Preece	RFK Racing	Ford	160	29
9	14	6	Brad Keselowski	RFK Racing	Ford	160	28
10	19	2	Austin Cindric	Team Penske	Ford	160	31
11	25	48	Alex Bowman	Hendrick Motorsports	Chevrolet	160	27
12	35	21	Josh Berry	Wood Brothers Racing	Ford	160	34
13	11	43	Erik Jones	Legacy Motor Club	Toyota	160	30
14	7	54	Ty Gibbs	Joe Gibbs Racing	Toyota	160	23
15	10	99	Daniel Suárez	Trackhouse Racing	Chevrolet	160	22
16	12	22	Joey Logano	Team Penske	Ford	160	25
17	9	20	Christopher Bell	Joe Gibbs Racing	Toyota	160	20
18	3	77	Carson Hocevar	Spire Motorsports	Chevrolet	160	20
19	22	7	Justin Haley	Spire Motorsports	Chevrolet	160	18
20	26	8	Kyle Busch	Richard Childress Racing	Chevrolet	160	17
21	33	16	A. J. Allmendinger	Kaulig Racing	Chevrolet	160	16
22	5	41	Cole Custer	Haas Factory Team	Ford	160	15
23	17	4	Noah Gragson	Front Row Motorsports	Ford	160	14
24	16	3	Austin Dillon	Richard Childress Racing	Chevrolet	160	13
25	15	38	Zane Smith	Front Row Motorsports	Ford	160	17
26	21	1	Ross Chastain	Trackhouse Racing	Chevrolet	160	11
27	31	24	William Byron	Hendrick Motorsports	Chevrolet	160	19
28	32	34	Todd Gilliland	Front Row Motorsports	Ford	160	9
29	36	51	Cody Ware	Rick Ware Racing	Ford	160	8
30	30	47	Ricky Stenhouse Jr.	Hyak Motorsports	Chevrolet	160	7
31	23	88	Shane van Gisbergen (R)	Trackhouse Racing	Chevrolet	159	6
32	8	45	Tyler Reddick	23XI Racing	Toyota	159	13
33	27	10	Ty Dillon	Kaulig Racing	Chevrolet	140	4
34	37	44	Brennan Poole (i)	NY Racing Team	Chevrolet	111	0
35	28	71	Michael McDowell	Spire Motorsports	Chevrolet	73	2
36	34	23	Bubba Wallace	23XI Racing	Toyota	54	1
37	29	35	Riley Herbst (R)	23XI Racing	Toyota	41	1
Official race results

=== Race statistics ===
- Lead changes: 11 among 9 different drivers
- Cautions/Laps: 7 for 31
- Red flags: 0
- Time of race: 3 hours, 4 minutes, and 20 seconds
- Average speed: 130.199 miles per hour (209.535 km/h)

== Media ==
=== Television ===
Prime Video covered the race on the television side. Adam Alexander, Dale Earnhardt Jr. and Steve Letarte called the race from the broadcast booth. Kim Coon, Marty Snider, and Trevor Bayne handled pit road for the television side.

Prime Video
Booth announcers	Pit reporters
Lap-by-lap: Adam Alexander; Color-commentator: Dale Earnhardt Jr. Color-commentator: Steve Letarte	Kim Coon; Marty Snider; Trevor Bayne

=== Radio ===
Radio coverage of the race was broadcast by Motor Racing Network (MRN) and simulcast on Sirius XM NASCAR Radio. Mike Bagley and Kurt Becker called the race in the booth while the field will race on the front stretch. Lead MRN Turn Announcer Dave Moody called the race from a billboard outside of turn 2 when the field is racing through turn 1. Tim Catafalmo called the race from a platform outside of turn 2 when the field races through turn 2. Nathan Prouty called the race from a billboard in the middle of Turn 3. Lead Pit Reporter for MRN Steve Post, Brienne Pedigo and Jason Toy worked pit road for the radio side.

MRN
Booth announcers	Turn announcers	Pit reporters
Lead announcer: Mike Bagley; Announcer: Kurt Becker	Turn 1: Dave Moody; Turn 2: Tim Catafalmo; Turn 3: Nathan Prouty	Steve Post; Brienne Pedigo; Jason Toy

== Standings after the race ==
Drivers' Championship standings

	Pos	Driver	Points
	1	William Byron	623
	2	Kyle Larson	569 (–54)
2	3	Denny Hamlin	545 (–78)
1	4	Christopher Bell	544 (–79)
1	5	Chase Elliott	543 (–80)
1	6	Ryan Blaney	503 (–120)
1	7	Tyler Reddick	490 (–133)
	8	Ross Chastain	454 (–169)
2	9	Chase Briscoe	450 (–173)
1	10	Joey Logano	436 (–187)
2	11	Chris Buescher	421 (–202)
2	12	Bubba Wallace	412 (–211)
1	13	Alex Bowman	403 (–220)
	14	Ryan Preece	383 (–240)
	15	Austin Cindric	368 (–255)
3	16	Josh Berry	354 (–269)
Official driver's standings

Manufacturers' Championship standings

Pos	Manufacturer	Points
1	Chevrolet	616
2	Toyota	608 (–8)
3	Ford	575 (–41)

- Note: Only the first 16 positions are included for the driver standings.
- . – Driver has clinched a position in the NASCAR Cup Series playoffs.

Previous race: 2025 Viva México 250	NASCAR Cup Series; 2025 season	Next race: 2025 Quaker State 400
