= 2017 ToyotaCare 250 =

Eighth race of the 2017 NASCAR Xfinity Series

Race details
- Race 8 of 33 in the 2017 NASCAR Xfinity Series
- Date: April 29, 2017
- Official name: 30th Annual ToyotaCare 250
- Location: Richmond, Virginia, Richmond International Raceway
- Course: Permanent racing facility
- Course length: 0.75 miles (1.21 km)
- Distance: 254 laps, 190.5 mi (306.58 km)
- Scheduled distance: 250 laps, 187.5 mi (301.752 km)
- Average speed: 87.541 miles per hour (140.884 km/h)

Pole position
Driver	Daniel Hemric	Richard Childress Racing
- Time: 22.885

Most laps led
Driver	Justin Allgaier	JR Motorsports
- Laps: 157

Winner
No. 42	Kyle Larson	Chip Ganassi Racing

Television in the United States
- Network: Fox Sports 1
- Announcers: Adam Alexander, Michael Waltrip, Joey Logano

Radio in the United States
- Radio: Motor Racing Network

The 2017 ToyotaCare 250 was the eighth stock car race of the 2017 NASCAR Xfinity Series season and the 30th iteration of the event. The race was held on Saturday, April 29, 2017, in Richmond, Virginia at Richmond Raceway, a 0.75 miles (1.21 km) D-shaped oval. The race was extended from its scheduled 250 laps to 254 due to a NASCAR overtime finish. At race's end, Kyle Larson, driving for Chip Ganassi Racing, would steal the victory on the final restart when the race would end under caution due to a wreck on the backstretch. The win was Larson's seventh career NASCAR Xfinity Series win and his second of the season. To fill out the podium, Justin Allgaier of JR Motorsports and Daniel Hemric of Richard Childress Racing would finish second and third, respectively.

== Entry list ==
- (R) denotes rookie driver.
- (i) denotes driver who is ineligible for series driver points.

#	Driver	Team	Make
00	Cole Custer (R)	Stewart–Haas Racing	Ford
0	Garrett Smithley	JD Motorsports	Chevrolet
1	Elliott Sadler	JR Motorsports	Chevrolet
01	Harrison Rhodes	JD Motorsports	Chevrolet
2	Austin Dillon (i)	Richard Childress Racing	Chevrolet
3	Ty Dillon (i)	Richard Childress Racing	Chevrolet
4	Ross Chastain	JD Motorsports	Chevrolet
5	Michael Annett	JR Motorsports	Chevrolet
6	Bubba Wallace	Roush Fenway Racing	Ford
7	Justin Allgaier	JR Motorsports	Chevrolet
07	Ray Black Jr.	SS-Green Light Racing	Chevrolet
8	Matt Mills	B. J. McLeod Motorsports	Chevrolet
9	William Byron (R)	JR Motorsports	Chevrolet
11	Blake Koch	Kaulig Racing	Chevrolet
13	Carl Long	MBM Motorsports	Dodge
14	J. J. Yeley	TriStar Motorsports	Toyota
16	Ryan Reed	Roush Fenway Racing	Ford
18	Daniel Suárez (i)	Joe Gibbs Racing	Toyota
19	Matt Tifft (R)	Joe Gibbs Racing	Toyota
20	Kyle Benjamin	Joe Gibbs Racing	Toyota
21	Daniel Hemric (R)	Richard Childress Racing	Chevrolet
22	Ryan Blaney (i)	Team Penske	Ford
23	Spencer Gallagher (R)	GMS Racing	Chevrolet
24	Dylan Lupton	JGL Racing	Toyota
28	Dakoda Armstrong	JGL Racing	Toyota
33	Brandon Jones	Richard Childress Racing	Chevrolet
39	Ryan Sieg	RSS Racing	Chevrolet
40	Timmy Hill	MBM Motorsports	Dodge
42	Kyle Larson (i)	Chip Ganassi Racing	Chevrolet
45	Tommy Joe Martins	Martins Motorsports	Chevrolet
46	Quin Houff	Precision Performance Motorsports	Chevrolet
48	Brennan Poole	Chip Ganassi Racing	Chevrolet
51	Jeremy Clements	Jeremy Clements Racing	Chevrolet
52	Joey Gase	Jimmy Means Racing	Chevrolet
62	Brendan Gaughan	Richard Childress Racing	Chevrolet
74	Mike Harmon	Mike Harmon Racing	Dodge
78	B. J. McLeod	B. J. McLeod Motorsports	Chevrolet
89	Morgan Shepherd	Shepherd Racing Ventures	Chevrolet
90	Brandon Brown	Brandonbilt Motorsports	Chevrolet
93	Jeff Green	RSS Racing	Chevrolet
98	Casey Mears	Biagi–DenBeste Racing	Ford
99	David Starr	B. J. McLeod Motorsports with SS-Green Light Racing	Chevrolet
Official entry list

== Practice ==
=== First practice ===
The first practice session was held on Friday, April 28, at 1:00 PM EST and lasted for 55 minutes. Cole Custer of Stewart–Haas Racing would set the fastest time in the session, with a lap of 22.796 and an average speed of 118.442 miles per hour (190.614 km/h).

Pos	#	Driver	Team	Make	Time	Speed
1	00	Cole Custer (R)	Stewart–Haas Racing	Ford	22.796	118.442
2	48	Brennan Poole	Chip Ganassi Racing	Chevrolet	22.921	117.796
3	3	Ty Dillon (i)	Richard Childress Racing	Chevrolet	22.960	117.596
Full first practice results

=== Final practice ===
The final practice session was held on Friday, April 28, at 3:00 PM EST and lasted for 55 minutes. Kyle Benjamin of Joe Gibbs Racing would set the fastest time in the session, with a lap of 23.061 and an average speed of 117.081 miles per hour (188.424 km/h).

Pos	#	Driver	Team	Make	Time	Speed
1	20	Kyle Benjamin	Joe Gibbs Racing	Toyota	23.061	117.081
2	42	Kyle Larson (i)	Chip Ganassi Racing	Chevrolet	23.168	116.540
3	48	Brennan Poole	Chip Ganassi Racing	Chevrolet	23.190	116.429
Full final practice results

== Qualifying ==
Qualifying was held on Saturday, April 29, at 10:05 AM EST. Since Richmond Raceway is under 2 miles (3.2 km), the qualifying system was a multi-car system that included three rounds. The first round was 15 minutes, where every driver would be able to set a lap within the 15 minutes. Then, the second round would consist of the fastest 24 cars in Round 1, and drivers would have 10 minutes to set a lap. Round 3 consisted of the fastest 12 drivers from Round 2, and the drivers would have 5 minutes to set a time. Whoever was fastest in Round 3 would win the pole.

Daniel Hemric of Richard Childress Racing would win the pole after advancing from both preliminary rounds and setting the fastest lap in Round 3, with a time of 22.885 and an average speed of 117.981 miles per hour (189.872 km/h).

Two drivers would fail to qualify: Tommy Joe Martins and Morgan Shepherd.

=== Full qualifying results ===
Pos	#	Driver	Team	Make	Time (R1)	Speed (R1)	Time (R2)	Speed (R2)	Time (R3)	Speed (R3)
1	21	Daniel Hemric (R)	Richard Childress Racing	Chevrolet	22.688	119.006	22.896	117.925	22.885	117.981
2	20	Kyle Benjamin	Joe Gibbs Racing	Toyota	22.994	117.422	22.964	117.575	22.903	117.888
3	18	Daniel Suárez (i)	Joe Gibbs Racing	Toyota	22.999	117.396	22.873	118.043	22.926	117.770
4	2	Austin Dillon (i)	Richard Childress Racing	Chevrolet	22.982	117.483	22.940	117.698	22.957	117.611
5	48	Brennan Poole	Chip Ganassi Racing	Chevrolet	22.732	118.775	22.733	118.770	22.963	117.580
6	7	Justin Allgaier	JR Motorsports	Chevrolet	22.952	117.637	22.776	118.546	22.967	117.560
7	42	Kyle Larson (i)	Chip Ganassi Racing	Chevrolet	22.763	118.614	22.987	117.458	22.993	117.427
8	3	Ty Dillon (i)	Richard Childress Racing	Chevrolet	22.984	117.473	22.933	117.734	23.006	117.361
9	9	William Byron (R)	JR Motorsports	Chevrolet	22.750	118.681	22.871	118.053	23.013	117.325
10	22	Ryan Blaney (i)	Team Penske	Ford	22.765	118.603	22.817	118.333	23.029	117.243
11	1	Elliott Sadler	JR Motorsports	Chevrolet	22.990	117.442	22.994	117.422	23.158	116.590
12	5	Michael Annett	JR Motorsports	Chevrolet	22.991	117.437	22.887	117.971	23.232	116.219
Eliminated in Round 2
13	19	Matt Tifft (R)	Joe Gibbs Racing	Toyota	23.023	117.274	22.995	117.417	-	-
14	11	Blake Koch	Kaulig Racing	Chevrolet	23.013	117.325	23.004	117.371	-	-
15	62	Brendan Gaughan	Richard Childress Racing	Chevrolet	22.976	117.514	23.007	117.356	-	-
16	00	Cole Custer (R)	Stewart–Haas Racing	Ford	22.853	118.146	23.011	117.335	-	-
17	16	Ryan Reed	Roush Fenway Racing	Ford	23.094	116.913	23.022	117.279	-	-
18	28	Dakoda Armstrong	JGL Racing	Toyota	23.100	116.883	23.084	116.964	-	-
19	6	Bubba Wallace	Roush Fenway Racing	Ford	23.061	117.081	23.089	116.939	-	-
20	39	Ryan Sieg	RSS Racing	Chevrolet	23.043	117.172	23.098	116.893	-	-
21	98	Casey Mears	Biagi–DenBeste Racing	Ford	23.000	117.391	23.103	116.868	-	-
22	99	David Starr	BJMM with SS-Green Light Racing	Chevrolet	23.013	117.325	23.218	116.289	-	-
23	4	Ross Chastain	JD Motorsports	Chevrolet	23.033	117.223	23.237	116.194	-	-
24	33	Brandon Jones	Richard Childress Racing	Chevrolet	23.012	117.330	23.270	116.029	-	-
Eliminated in Round 1
25	93	Jeff Green	RSS Racing	Chevrolet	23.104	116.863	-	-	-	-
26	90	Brandon Brown	Brandonbilt Motorsports	Chevrolet	23.136	116.701	-	-	-	-
27	46	Quin Houff	Precision Performance Motorsports	Chevrolet	23.148	116.641	-	-	-	-
28	24	Dylan Lupton	JGL Racing	Toyota	23.163	116.565	-	-	-	-
29	01	Harrison Rhodes	JD Motorsports	Chevrolet	23.189	116.435	-	-	-	-
30	52	Joey Gase	Jimmy Means Racing	Chevrolet	23.234	116.209	-	-	-	-
31	78	B. J. McLeod	B. J. McLeod Motorsports	Chevrolet	23.241	116.174	-	-	-	-
32	51	Jeremy Clements	Jeremy Clements Racing	Chevrolet	23.256	116.099	-	-	-	-
33	23	Spencer Gallagher (R)	GMS Racing	Chevrolet	23.272	116.019	-	-	-	-
Qualified by owner's points
34	07	Ray Black Jr.	SS-Green Light Racing	Chevrolet	23.272	116.019	-	-	-	-
35	14	J. J. Yeley	TriStar Motorsports	Toyota	23.304	115.860	-	-	-	-
36	8	Matt Mills	B. J. McLeod Motorsports	Chevrolet	23.355	115.607	-	-	-	-
37	74	Mike Harmon	Mike Harmon Racing	Dodge	23.473	115.026	-	-	-	-
38	0	Garrett Smithley	JD Motorsports	Chevrolet	23.582	114.494	-	-	-	-
39	13	Carl Long	MBM Motorsports	Dodge	23.607	114.373	-	-	-	-
40	40	Timmy Hill	MBM Motorsports	Chevrolet	24.192	111.607	-	-	-	-
Failed to qualify
41	45	Tommy Joe Martins	Martins Motorsports	Chevrolet	23.313	115.815	-	-	-	-
42	89	Morgan Shepherd	Shepherd Racing Ventures	Chevrolet	23.442	115.178	-	-	-	-
Official qualifying results
Official starting lineup

== Race results ==
Stage 1 Laps: 75

Pos	#	Driver	Team	Make	Pts
1	2	Austin Dillon (i)	Richard Childress Racing	Chevrolet	0
2	7	Justin Allgaier	JR Motorsports	Chevrolet	9
3	21	Daniel Hemric (R)	Richard Childress Racing	Chevrolet	8
4	3	Ty Dillon (i)	Richard Childress Racing	Chevrolet	0
5	20	Kyle Benjamin	Joe Gibbs Racing	Toyota	6
6	42	Kyle Larson (i)	Chip Ganassi Racing	Chevrolet	0
7	18	Daniel Suárez (i)	Joe Gibbs Racing	Toyota	0
8	1	Elliott Sadler	JR Motorsports	Chevrolet	3
9	22	Ryan Blaney (i)	Team Penske	Ford	0
10	48	Brennan Poole	Chip Ganassi Racing	Chevrolet	1

Stage 2 Laps: 75

Pos	#	Driver	Team	Make	Pts
1	7	Justin Allgaier	JR Motorsports	Chevrolet	10
2	2	Austin Dillon (i)	Richard Childress Racing	Chevrolet	0
3	3	Ty Dillon (i)	Richard Childress Racing	Chevrolet	0
4	42	Kyle Larson (i)	Chip Ganassi Racing	Chevrolet	0
5	21	Daniel Hemric (R)	Richard Childress Racing	Chevrolet	6
6	20	Kyle Benjamin	Joe Gibbs Racing	Toyota	5
7	22	Ryan Blaney (i)	Team Penske	Ford	0
8	18	Daniel Suárez (i)	Joe Gibbs Racing	Toyota	0
9	1	Elliott Sadler	JR Motorsports	Chevrolet	2
10	48	Brennan Poole	Chip Ganassi Racing	Chevrolet	1

Stage 3 Laps: 104

Pos	#	Driver	Team	Make	Laps	Led	Status	Pts
1	42	Kyle Larson (i)	Chip Ganassi Racing	Chevrolet	254	10	running	0
2	7	Justin Allgaier	JR Motorsports	Chevrolet	254	157	running	54
3	21	Daniel Hemric (R)	Richard Childress Racing	Chevrolet	254	26	running	48
4	2	Austin Dillon (i)	Richard Childress Racing	Chevrolet	254	58	running	0
5	22	Ryan Blaney (i)	Team Penske	Ford	254	0	running	0
6	6	Bubba Wallace	Roush Fenway Racing	Ford	254	0	running	31
7	1	Elliott Sadler	JR Motorsports	Chevrolet	254	0	running	35
8	5	Michael Annett	JR Motorsports	Chevrolet	254	0	running	29
9	98	Casey Mears	Biagi–DenBeste Racing	Ford	254	0	running	28
10	23	Spencer Gallagher (R)	GMS Racing	Chevrolet	254	0	running	27
11	11	Blake Koch	Kaulig Racing	Chevrolet	254	0	running	26
12	24	Dylan Lupton	JGL Racing	Toyota	254	0	running	25
13	00	Cole Custer (R)	Stewart–Haas Racing	Ford	254	0	running	24
14	19	Matt Tifft (R)	Joe Gibbs Racing	Toyota	254	0	running	23
15	51	Jeremy Clements	Jeremy Clements Racing	Chevrolet	254	0	running	22
16	28	Dakoda Armstrong	JGL Racing	Toyota	254	0	running	21
17	99	David Starr	BJMM with SS-Green Light Racing	Chevrolet	254	0	running	20
18	07	Ray Black Jr.	SS-Green Light Racing	Chevrolet	254	0	running	19
19	3	Ty Dillon (i)	Richard Childress Racing	Chevrolet	254	3	running	0
20	52	Joey Gase	Jimmy Means Racing	Chevrolet	254	0	running	17
21	18	Daniel Suárez (i)	Joe Gibbs Racing	Toyota	254	0	running	0
22	48	Brennan Poole	Chip Ganassi Racing	Chevrolet	253	0	running	17
23	16	Ryan Reed	Roush Fenway Racing	Ford	252	0	running	14
24	01	Harrison Rhodes	JD Motorsports	Chevrolet	252	0	running	13
25	90	Brandon Brown	Brandonbilt Motorsports	Chevrolet	252	0	running	12
26	39	Ryan Sieg	RSS Racing	Chevrolet	252	0	running	11
27	46	Quin Houff	Precision Performance Motorsports	Chevrolet	251	0	running	10
28	40	Timmy Hill	MBM Motorsports	Chevrolet	251	0	running	9
29	0	Garrett Smithley	JD Motorsports	Chevrolet	251	0	running	8
30	9	William Byron (R)	JR Motorsports	Chevrolet	249	0	crash	7
31	8	Matt Mills	B. J. McLeod Motorsports	Chevrolet	248	0	running	6
32	20	Kyle Benjamin	Joe Gibbs Racing	Toyota	247	0	crash	16
33	33	Brandon Jones	Richard Childress Racing	Chevrolet	247	0	running	4
34	13	Carl Long	MBM Motorsports	Dodge	245	0	running	3
35	62	Brendan Gaughan	Richard Childress Racing	Chevrolet	244	0	crash	2
36	74	Mike Harmon	Mike Harmon Racing	Dodge	239	0	running	1
37	78	B. J. McLeod	B. J. McLeod Motorsports	Chevrolet	236	0	engine	1
38	4	Ross Chastain	JD Motorsports	Chevrolet	223	0	running	1
39	14	J. J. Yeley	TriStar Motorsports	Toyota	181	0	rear gear	1
40	93	Jeff Green	RSS Racing	Chevrolet	3	0	electrical	1
Official race results

== Standings after the race ==
Drivers' Championship standings

Pos	Driver	Points
1	Elliott Sadler	295
2	Justin Allgaier	254 (–41)
3	William Byron	251 (–44)
4	Daniel Hemric	228 (–67)
5	Bubba Wallace	211 (–84)
6	Ryan Reed	198 (–97)
7	Blake Koch	190 (–105)
8	Michael Annett	186 (–109)
9	Matt Tifft	183 (–112)
10	Brennan Poole	180 (–115)
11	Dakoda Armstrong	160 (–135)
12	Cole Custer	154 (–141)
Official driver's standings

- Note: Only the first 12 positions are included for the driver standings.

Previous race: 2017 Fitzgerald Glider Kits 300	NASCAR Xfinity Series; 2017 season	Next race: 2017 Sparks Energy 300
