= 2017 Pocono Green 250 =

12th race of the 2017 NASCAR Xfinity Series

Race details
- Race 12 of 33 in the 2017 NASCAR Xfinity Series
- Date: June 10, 2017
- Official name: 2nd Annual Pocono Green 250
- Location: Long Pond, Pennsylvania, Pocono Raceway
- Course: Permanent racing facility
- Course length: 2.5 miles (4.0 km)
- Distance: 100 laps, 250 mi (402.336 km)
- Scheduled distance: 100 laps, 250 mi (402.336 km)
- Average speed: 135.583 miles per hour (218.200 km/h)

Pole position
Driver	Kyle Benjamin	Joe Gibbs Racing
- Time: 52.070

Most laps led
Driver	Brad Keselowski	Team Penske
- Laps: 29

Winner
No. 22	Brad Keselowski	Team Penske

Television in the United States
- Network: FOX
- Announcers: Kevin Harvick, Joey Logano, Clint Bowyer

Radio in the United States
- Radio: Motor Racing Network

The 2017 Pocono Green 250 was the 12th stock car race of the 2017 NASCAR Xfinity Series season and the second iteration of the event. The race was held on Saturday, June 10, 2017, Long Pond, Pennsylvania, at Pocono Raceway, a 2.5 miles (4.0 km) triangular permanent course. The race took the scheduled 100 laps to complete. At race's end, Brad Keselowski driving for Team Penske, would make a last lap pass on the final lap to win his 35th career NASCAR Xfinity Series win and his first win of the season. To fill out the podium, Justin Allgaier of JR Motorsports and Kyle Larson of Chip Ganassi Racing would finish second and third, respectively.

== Entry list ==
- (R) denotes rookie driver.
- (i) denotes driver who is ineligible for series driver points.

#	Driver	Team	Make
00	Cole Custer (R)	Stewart–Haas Racing	Ford
0	Garrett Smithley	JD Motorsports	Chevrolet
1	Elliott Sadler	JR Motorsports	Chevrolet
01	Harrison Rhodes	JD Motorsports	Chevrolet
2	Paul Menard (i)	Richard Childress Racing	Chevrolet
3	Ty Dillon (i)	Richard Childress Racing	Chevrolet
4	Ross Chastain	JD Motorsports	Chevrolet
5	Michael Annett	JR Motorsports	Chevrolet
6	Bubba Wallace	Roush Fenway Racing	Ford
7	Justin Allgaier	JR Motorsports	Chevrolet
07	Spencer Boyd	SS-Green Light Racing	Chevrolet
8	B. J. McLeod	B. J. McLeod Motorsports	Chevrolet
9	William Byron (R)	JR Motorsports	Chevrolet
11	Blake Koch	Kaulig Racing	Chevrolet
13	Carl Long	MBM Motorsports	Dodge
14	J. J. Yeley	TriStar Motorsports	Toyota
16	Ryan Reed	Roush Fenway Racing	Ford
18	Daniel Suárez (i)	Joe Gibbs Racing	Toyota
19	Matt Tifft (R)	Joe Gibbs Racing	Toyota
20	Kyle Benjamin	Joe Gibbs Racing	Toyota
21	Daniel Hemric (R)	Richard Childress Racing	Chevrolet
22	Brad Keselowski (i)	Team Penske	Ford
23	Spencer Gallagher (R)	GMS Racing	Chevrolet
24	Dylan Lupton	JGL Racing	Toyota
28	Dakoda Armstrong	JGL Racing	Toyota
33	Brandon Jones	Richard Childress Racing	Chevrolet
39	Ryan Sieg	RSS Racing	Chevrolet
40	Timmy Hill	MBM Motorsports	Chevrolet
42	Kyle Larson (i)	Chip Ganassi Racing	Chevrolet
48	Brennan Poole	Chip Ganassi Racing	Chevrolet
51	Jeremy Clements	Jeremy Clements Racing	Chevrolet
52	Joey Gase	Jimmy Means Racing	Chevrolet
62	Brendan Gaughan	Richard Childress Racing	Chevrolet
74	Mike Harmon	Mike Harmon Racing	Dodge
78	Tommy Joe Martins	B. J. McLeod Motorsports	Chevrolet
89	Morgan Shepherd	Shepherd Racing Ventures	Chevrolet
90	Josh Williams	King Autosport	Chevrolet
93	Jeff Green	RSS Racing	Chevrolet
98	Casey Mears	Biagi–DenBeste Racing	Ford
99	David Starr	B. J. McLeod Motorsports with SS-Green Light Racing	Chevrolet
Official entry list

== Practice ==
=== First practice ===
The first practice session was held on Friday, July 7, at 1:00 PM EST. The session would last for 55 minutes. Brad Keselowski of Team Penske would set the fastest time in the session, with a lap of 28.806 and an average speed of 132.222 mph (212.791 km/h).

Pos	#	Driver	Team	Make	Time	Speed
1	22	Brad Keselowski (i)	Team Penske	Ford	53.210	169.141
2	20	Kyle Benjamin	Joe Gibbs Racing	Toyota	53.327	168.770
3	42	Kyle Larson (i)	Chip Ganassi Racing	Chevrolet	53.449	168.385
Full first practice results

=== Final practice ===
The second and final practice session, was held on Friday, July 7, at 3:00 PM EST. The session would last for 55 minutes. Kyle Benjamin of Joe Gibbs Racing would set the fastest time in the session, with a lap of 52.722 and an average speed of 170.707 mph (274.726 km/h).

Pos	#	Driver	Team	Make	Time	Speed
1	20	Kyle Benjamin	Joe Gibbs Racing	Toyota	52.722	170.707
2	21	Daniel Hemric (R)	Richard Childress Racing	Chevrolet	52.995	169.827
3	22	Brad Keselowski (i)	Team Penske	Ford	53.179	169.240
Full final practice results

== Qualifying ==
Qualifying was held on Saturday, June 10, at 9:35 AM EST. Since Pocono Raceway is at least 2 miles (3.2 km) in length, the qualifying system was a single car, single lap, two round system where in the first round, everyone would set a time to determine positions 13–40. Then, the fastest 12 qualifiers would move on to the second round to determine positions 1–12.

Kyle Benjamin of Joe Gibbs Racing would win the pole, setting a time of 52.070 and an average speed of 172.844 miles per hour (278.165 km/h) in the second round.

No drivers would fail to qualify.

=== Full qualifying results ===
Pos	#	Driver	Team	Make	Time (R1)	Speed (R1)	Time (R2)	Speed (R2)
1	20	Kyle Benjamin	Joe Gibbs Racing	Toyota	52.409	171.726	52.070	172.844
2	21	Daniel Hemric (R)	Richard Childress Racing	Chevrolet	52.387	171.798	52.233	172.305
3	00	Cole Custer (R)	Stewart–Haas Racing	Ford	52.701	170.775	52.236	172.295
4	7	Justin Allgaier	JR Motorsports	Chevrolet	52.408	171.730	52.259	172.219
5	9	William Byron (R)	JR Motorsports	Chevrolet	52.502	171.422	52.394	171.775
6	42	Kyle Larson (i)	Chip Ganassi Racing	Chevrolet	52.449	171.595	52.472	171.520
7	18	Daniel Suárez (i)	Joe Gibbs Racing	Toyota	52.749	170.619	52.476	171.507
8	22	Brad Keselowski (i)	Team Penske	Ford	52.749	170.619	52.486	171.474
9	2	Paul Menard (i)	Richard Childress Racing	Chevrolet	52.696	170.791	52.526	171.344
10	48	Brennan Poole	Chip Ganassi Racing	Chevrolet	52.597	171.112	52.694	170.797
11	62	Brendan Gaughan	Richard Childress Racing	Chevrolet	52.705	170.762	52.891	170.161
12	11	Blake Koch	Kaulig Racing	Chevrolet	52.500	171.429	53.022	169.741
Eliminated in Round 1
13	6	Bubba Wallace	Roush Fenway Racing	Ford	52.768	170.558	-	-
14	23	Spencer Gallagher (R)	GMS Racing	Chevrolet	52.929	170.039	-	-
15	3	Ty Dillon (i)	Richard Childress Racing	Chevrolet	53.016	169.760	-	-
16	16	Ryan Reed	Roush Fenway Racing	Ford	53.159	169.303	-	-
17	33	Brandon Jones	Richard Childress Racing	Chevrolet	53.200	169.173	-	-
18	1	Elliott Sadler	JR Motorsports	Chevrolet	53.257	168.992	-	-
19	39	Ryan Sieg	RSS Racing	Chevrolet	53.350	168.697	-	-
20	24	Dylan Lupton	JGL Racing	Toyota	53.505	168.209	-	-
21	5	Michael Annett	JR Motorsports	Chevrolet	53.516	168.174	-	-
22	28	Dakoda Armstrong	JGL Racing	Toyota	53.608	167.885	-	-
23	8	B. J. McLeod	B. J. McLeod Motorsports	Chevrolet	53.623	167.838	-	-
24	4	Ross Chastain	JD Motorsports	Chevrolet	53.708	167.573	-	-
25	51	Jeremy Clements	Jeremy Clements Racing	Chevrolet	53.726	167.517	-	-
26	14	J. J. Yeley	TriStar Motorsports	Toyota	53.917	166.923	-	-
27	01	Harrison Rhodes	JD Motorsports	Chevrolet	54.447	165.298	-	-
28	93	Jeff Green	RSS Racing	Chevrolet	54.513	165.098	-	-
29	78	Tommy Joe Martins	B. J. McLeod Motorsports	Chevrolet	54.582	164.890	-	-
30	40	Timmy Hill	MBM Motorsports	Chevrolet	54.620	164.775	-	-
31	19	Matt Tifft (R)	Joe Gibbs Racing	Toyota	54.842	164.108	-	-
32	99	David Starr	BJMM with SS-Green Light Racing	Chevrolet	54.938	163.821	-	-
33	89	Morgan Shepherd	Shepherd Racing Ventures	Chevrolet	55.039	163.520	-	-
Qualified by owner's points
34	90	Josh Williams	King Autosport	Chevrolet	55.113	163.301	-	-
35	0	Garrett Smithley	JD Motorsports	Chevrolet	55.124	163.268	-	-
36	52	Joey Gase	Jimmy Means Racing	Chevrolet	55.561	161.984	-	-
37	07	Spencer Boyd	SS-Green Light Racing	Chevrolet	56.608	158.988	-	-
38	13	Carl Long	MBM Motorsports	Dodge	57.389	156.824	-	-
39	74	Mike Harmon	Mike Harmon Racing	Dodge	57.762	155.812	-	-
40	98	Casey Mears	Biagi–DenBeste Racing	Ford	-	-	-	-
Official qualifying results
Official starting lineup

== Race results ==
Stage 1 Laps: 25

Pos	#	Driver	Team	Make	Pts
1	22	Brad Keselowski (i)	Team Penske	Ford	0
2	20	Kyle Benjamin	Joe Gibbs Racing	Toyota	9
3	42	Kyle Larson (i)	Chip Ganassi Racing	Chevrolet	0
4	2	Paul Menard (i)	Richard Childress Racing	Chevrolet	0
5	18	Daniel Suárez (i)	Joe Gibbs Racing	Toyota	0
6	7	Justin Allgaier	JR Motorsports	Chevrolet	5
7	9	William Byron (R)	JR Motorsports	Chevrolet	4
8	21	Daniel Hemric (R)	Richard Childress Racing	Chevrolet	3
9	3	Ty Dillon (i)	Richard Childress Racing	Chevrolet	0
10	48	Brennan Poole	Chip Ganassi Racing	Chevrolet	1

Stage 2 Laps: 25

Pos	#	Driver	Team	Make	Pts
1	22	Brad Keselowski (i)	Team Penske	Ford	0
2	20	Kyle Benjamin	Joe Gibbs Racing	Toyota	9
3	00	Cole Custer (R)	Stewart–Haas Racing	Ford	8
4	42	Kyle Larson (i)	Chip Ganassi Racing	Chevrolet	0
5	7	Justin Allgaier	JR Motorsports	Chevrolet	6
6	48	Brennan Poole	Chip Ganassi Racing	Chevrolet	5
7	6	Bubba Wallace	Roush Fenway Racing	Ford	4
8	16	Ryan Reed	Roush Fenway Racing	Ford	3
9	19	Matt Tifft (R)	Joe Gibbs Racing	Toyota	2
10	62	Brendan Gaughan	Richard Childress Racing	Chevrolet	1

Stage 3 Laps: 50

Pos	#	Driver	Team	Make	Laps	Led	Status	Pts
1	22	Brad Keselowski (i)	Team Penske	Ford	100	29	running	0
2	7	Justin Allgaier	JR Motorsports	Chevrolet	100	13	running	46
3	42	Kyle Larson (i)	Chip Ganassi Racing	Chevrolet	100	15	running	0
4	1	Elliott Sadler	JR Motorsports	Chevrolet	100	0	running	33
5	18	Daniel Suárez (i)	Joe Gibbs Racing	Toyota	100	1	running	0
6	62	Brendan Gaughan	Richard Childress Racing	Chevrolet	100	0	running	32
7	00	Cole Custer (R)	Stewart–Haas Racing	Ford	100	14	running	38
8	3	Ty Dillon (i)	Richard Childress Racing	Chevrolet	100	0	running	0
9	21	Daniel Hemric (R)	Richard Childress Racing	Chevrolet	100	0	running	31
10	19	Matt Tifft (R)	Joe Gibbs Racing	Toyota	100	0	running	29
11	6	Bubba Wallace	Roush Fenway Racing	Ford	100	0	running	30
12	9	William Byron (R)	JR Motorsports	Chevrolet	100	0	running	29
13	5	Michael Annett	JR Motorsports	Chevrolet	100	0	running	24
14	16	Ryan Reed	Roush Fenway Racing	Ford	100	0	running	26
15	48	Brennan Poole	Chip Ganassi Racing	Chevrolet	100	0	running	28
16	20	Kyle Benjamin	Joe Gibbs Racing	Toyota	100	28	running	39
17	51	Jeremy Clements	Jeremy Clements Racing	Chevrolet	100	0	running	20
18	23	Spencer Gallagher (R)	GMS Racing	Chevrolet	100	0	running	19
19	14	J. J. Yeley	TriStar Motorsports	Toyota	100	0	running	18
20	28	Dakoda Armstrong	JGL Racing	Toyota	100	0	running	17
21	98	Casey Mears	Biagi–DenBeste Racing	Ford	100	0	running	16
22	24	Dylan Lupton	JGL Racing	Toyota	100	0	running	15
23	39	Ryan Sieg	RSS Racing	Chevrolet	100	0	running	14
24	4	Ross Chastain	JD Motorsports	Chevrolet	100	0	running	13
25	99	David Starr	BJMM with SS-Green Light Racing	Chevrolet	100	0	running	12
26	8	B. J. McLeod	B. J. McLeod Motorsports	Chevrolet	100	0	running	11
27	11	Blake Koch	Kaulig Racing	Chevrolet	100	0	running	10
28	90	Josh Williams	King Autosport	Chevrolet	99	0	running	9
29	78	Tommy Joe Martins	B. J. McLeod Motorsports	Chevrolet	98	0	running	8
30	40	Timmy Hill	MBM Motorsports	Chevrolet	97	0	running	7
31	2	Paul Menard (i)	Richard Childress Racing	Chevrolet	97	0	running	0
32	52	Joey Gase	Jimmy Means Racing	Chevrolet	97	0	running	5
33	07	Spencer Boyd	SS-Green Light Racing	Chevrolet	97	0	running	4
34	74	Mike Harmon	Mike Harmon Racing	Dodge	95	0	running	3
35	0	Garrett Smithley	JD Motorsports	Chevrolet	85	0	engine	2
36	33	Brandon Jones	Richard Childress Racing	Chevrolet	77	0	crash	1
37	01	Harrison Rhodes	JD Motorsports	Chevrolet	49	0	clutch	1
38	89	Morgan Shepherd	Shepherd Racing Ventures	Chevrolet	16	0	handling	1
39	13	Carl Long	MBM Motorsports	Dodge	12	0	handling	1
40	93	Jeff Green	RSS Racing	Chevrolet	7	0	brakes	1
Official race results

== Standings after the race ==
Drivers' Championship standings

Pos	Driver	Points
1	Justin Allgaier	409
2	Elliott Sadler	408 (–1)
3	William Byron	347 (–62)
4	Bubba Wallace	321 (–88)
5	Daniel Hemric	314 (–95)
6	Ryan Reed	296 (–113)
7	Brennan Poole	291 (–118)
8	Matt Tifft	284 (–125)
9	Cole Custer	280 (–129)
10	Michael Annett	272 (–137)
11	Blake Koch	237 (–172)
12	Dakoda Armstrong	226 (–183)
Official driver's standings

- Note: Only the first 12 positions are included for the driver standings.

Previous race: 2017 OneMain Financial 200	NASCAR Xfinity Series; 2017 season	Next race: 2017 Irish Hills 250
