= Yxngxr1 =

British rapper (born 1998)

yxngxr1
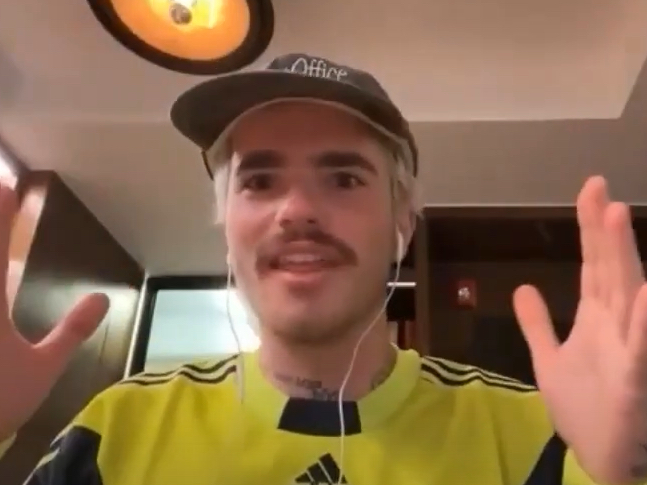
- yxngxr1 in 2023

Background information
- Also known as: yxngxr1
- Born: Timothy Francis Lee; 28 September 1998 (age 27); Cardiff, Wales
- Genres: Hip hop; indie rock; alternative rock
- Years active: 2018–present
- Label: Empire Records

Timothy Francis Lee (born 28 September 1998), known by his stage name yxngxr1 (pronounced younger one), is a British rapper. He is best known for songs such as "Rather Do", "Tyler", "721" and "RockStore".

== Early life and career ==
In early 2019, yxngxr1 initially began posting songs to SoundCloud and released his debut single, "Tyler", and his debut album, "Childhood Dreams". He also held a day job at Foot Locker after high school.

In 2020, yxngxr1 released a new album titled, "I Don't Suit Hats".

On 5 July 2020 yxngxr1 released a new EP, "Yellow Yellow Yellow".

In 2021, yxngxr1 released two new albums, "Digikid" and "Digikid 2".

On 13 May 2022 yxngxr1 released a new album titled, "Teenage Motel", that featured songs such as "Nice Guy", "BMW", and "Sweatshirt" alongside a deluxe version of the album titled "Teenage Motel (Deluxe)".

In 2023, he released a new album titled "where has everyone gone.". He also moved to London.

== Personal life ==
yxngxr1 has said that he enjoys playing tennis and watching Cardiff City F.C.

He has stated inspirations for his music being Tyler, the Creator and Dominic Fike.
