= Dartfish (company) =

Swiss offline video software company

- Type: Private
- Industry: Video processing
- Founded: December 1998
- Founders: Jean-Marie Ayer, Victor Bergonzoli, Serge Ayer, Emmanuel Reusens
- Headquarters: Fribourg, Switzerland
- Area served: Worldwide
- Key people: Victor Bergenzoli (Co-founder, CEO); Serge Ayer (Co-founder, CTO); Daniel Morand (CFO); Anton Affentranger (Executive Chairman)
- Products: SimulCam, StroMotion
- Number of employees: 81 (2025)

Dartfish is a company based in Fribourg, Switzerland. The company develops online and offline video software to enable users to view, edit and analyse videos for individual and corporate use. The company was founded in 1998 at the Swiss Institute of Technology EPFL and has offices in Atlanta, Georgia, USA; Sophia Antipolis, France; Sydney, Australia; Tokyo, Japan; and Seoul, South Korea.

== History ==
Dartfish was founded in December 1998 as InMotion Technologies, Ltd to commercially develop SimulCam and other digital imaging applications. The SimulCam technology came out of image and video processing research at EPFL in 1997, in the laboratory of Martin Vetterli. The co-founders included Jean-Marie Ayer, who was chairman and chief executive until 2003, Victor Bergonzoli, Serge Ayer and Emmanuel Reusens. SimulCam technology was followed by StroMotion, in January 2001.

By mid-2004 the company had raised CHF 17.8 million from investors and employed 25 people, eight of them in the United States. Sales were CHF 5.5 million in 2003, and the first quarter of 2004 was its first at break-even.

In January 2004, Dartfish entered a distribution agreement with South America in Chile. Five months later, Dartfish launched its third version (3.0) of the Dartfish software. In November 2004, Dartfish created a new subsidiary in France to distribute its software. In June 2005, Dartfish launched version 4.0 of the software.

Dartfish TV, an online video platform for performance analysis, followed in 2008, and mobile apps for iPhone and iPad in 2012. Since August 2023 the company has also held FIFA certification for a video assistant referee (VAR) system.

== Technical Details ==
Dartfish.TV is an integrated solution across multiple platforms (software, online, mobile) that allows users to capture videos, tag events real-time, and upload, organize and share the videos via Dartfish TV channel. Tagging enables users to bookmark specific events or series of events in their videos so that users including coaches, athletes and corporate managers can identify specific stats or important moments in the video and directly navigate or share the moments.
Dartfish Software is used by athletic coaches to break down and analyze the movements as well as categorize videos to create an index of events (e.g. pass goal, player, etc.). The software uses digital video graphics to provide visual feedback. Also, it is reported that it can improve processes and performance, trainings, risk management and HR functions.

== Use ==
NBC used SimulCam and StroMotion in its coverage of the 2006 Winter Olympics in Turin and again at the 2010 Games in Vancouver. Dartfish software supported the athletes who won 400 medals during the Olympic Games in 2012 and helped to prepare the U.S. team in the 2011 Davis Cup. Its network of users includes major league sports teams, Olympic committees from many nations, federations, colleges and universities, high schools, prep schools, branches of military, industry and professionals, as well as athletes and students of all levels in numerous academic fields.

== Recognition ==
In 1999, it was European IST Prize Winner (InMotion). In 2005, it was Emmy winner for the Outstanding Innovative Technical Achievement Award. In 2006, it was the winner of the Korean Culture and Sports Ministry competition for identifying innovative, high-value added sports service business with its proposal, Customized Online Prescription of Physiotherapy.
