= Remember Everyone Deployed =

Unofficial observance

Remember Everyone Deployed (also known as RED or Red Friday) is a concept of honoring United States military service members currently deployed overseas.

Remember Everyone Deployed is believed to have originated in April 2015 with students at Mansfield University. They wore red-colored clothing on Fridays as a way to let all deployed service members know that they are remembered and appreciated.

The term was used by Brennan Poole on his vehicle during a 2020 NASCAR Camping World Truck Series race.

As of April 2025, the phrase "Red Friday" and the hashtag #RedFriday continued to trend on Fridays under the "What's Happening" section in the sidebar on the social media platform X (formerly Twitter).
