= Speedco =

Truck care chain in the United States

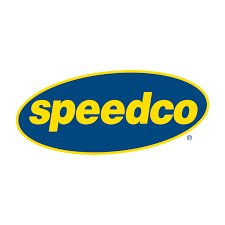

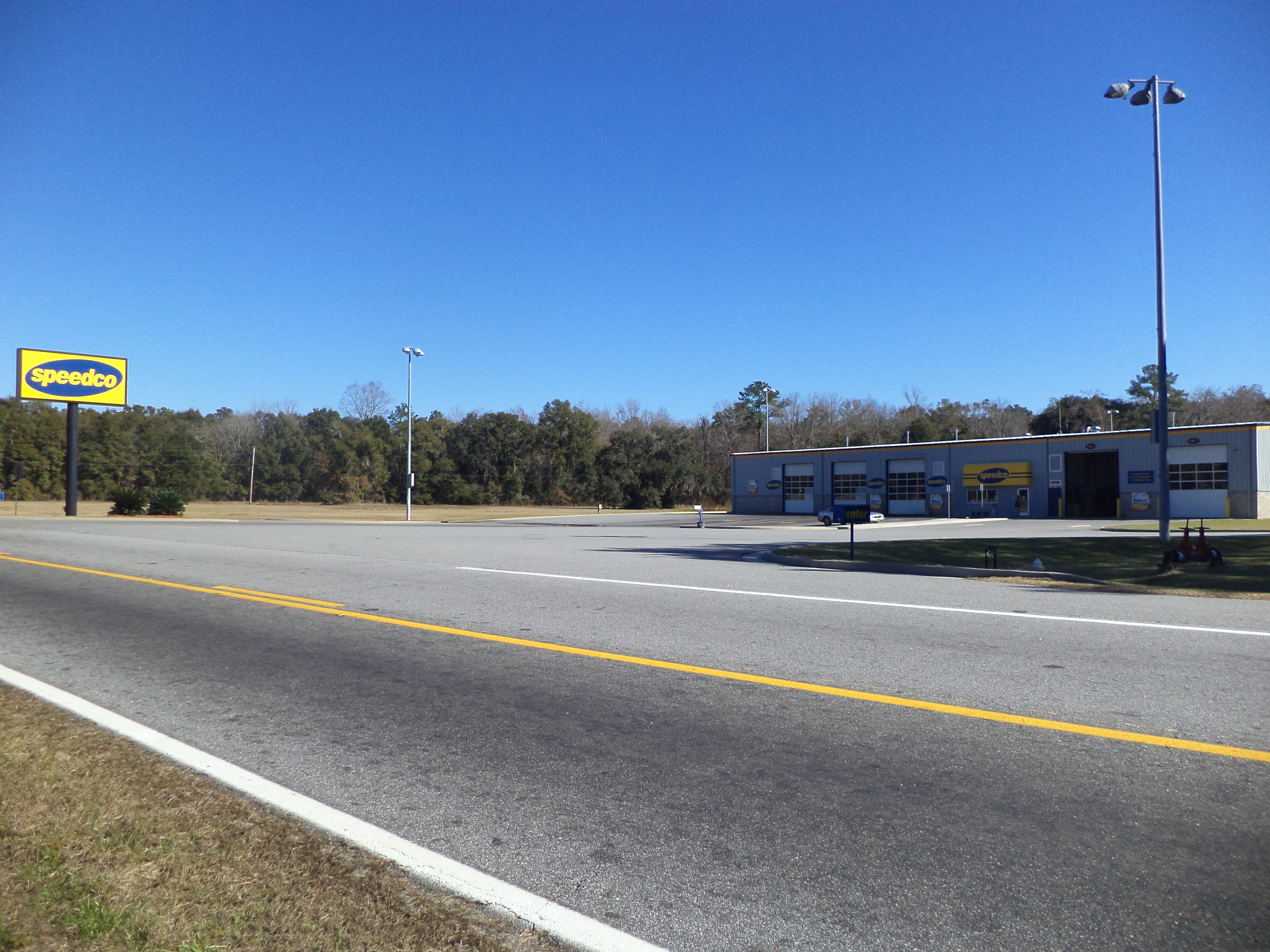
- Speedco, 6847 Bellville Road, Lake Park, Lowndes County, Georgia
- Company type: Wholly owned subsidiary
- Industry: Automotive
- Founded: 1991; 35 years ago Effingham, Illinois, U.S.
- Founder: Mark Clark; Jeff Clark; Jim Dudley
- Headquarters: Oklahoma City, Oklahoma, U.S.
- Number of locations: 430 (2021)
- Owner: Love's Travel Stops & Country Stores
- Parent: Love's Travel Stops & Country Stores
- Website: loves.com/en/truck-services

Speedco is an American chain of automotive oil change specialty shops founded in Effingham, Illinois in 1991 as Speedy Truck Lube. It has been a subsidiary of Love's since 2017, and is headquartered in Oklahoma City, Oklahoma. Speedco has 430 locations across the United States.

== History ==
Mark & Jeff Clark along with Jim Dudley founded the company in September of 1991 in Effingham, Illinois. They opened a second location in Troy, Illinois.

== Sponsorships ==
Speedco has sponsored various NASCAR race teams including Front Row Motorsports in the NASCAR Truck Series and NASCAR Cup Series with drivers such as Todd Gilliland, Zane Smith, David Ragan and Matt Tifft. They have also sponsored JR Motorsports with Josh Berry in the NASCAR Xfinity Series.
