= 2015 Lucas Oil 200 =

6th race of the 2015 NASCAR Camping World Truck Series

Race details
- Race 6 of 23 of the 2015 NASCAR Camping World Truck Series
- Date: May 29, 2015
- Official name: 16th Annual Lucas Oil 200
- Location: Dover International Speedway, Dover, Delaware
- Course: Permanent racing facility
- Course length: 1 miles (1.6 km)
- Distance: 200 laps, 200 mi (320 km)
- Scheduled distance: 200 laps, 200 mi (320 km)
- Average speed: 102.990 mph (165.746 km/h)

Pole position
Driver	Ryan Blaney	Brad Keselowski Racing
- Time: 22.718

Most laps led
Driver	Cole Custer	JR Motorsports
- Laps: 67

Winner
No. 19	Tyler Reddick	Brad Keselowski Racing

Television in the United States
- Network: FS1
- Announcers: Ralph Sheheen, Phil Parsons, and Brandon McReynolds

Radio in the United States
- Radio: MRN

The 2015 Lucas Oil 200 was the 6th stock car race of the 2015 NASCAR Camping World Truck Series, and the 16th iteration of the event. The race was held on Friday, May 29, 2015, in Dover, Delaware at Dover International Speedway, a 1-mile (1.6 km) permanent oval shaped racetrack. The race took the scheduled 200 laps to complete. Tyler Reddick, driving for Brad Keselowski Racing, would make a pass for the lead on Erik Jones with eight laps to go, and held off a charging Daniel Suárez to earn his second career NASCAR Camping World Truck Series win, and his second of the season. To fill out the podium, Suárez, driving for Kyle Busch Motorsports, and Jones, driving for Kyle Busch Motorsports, would finish 2nd and 3rd, respectively.

== Background ==
The layout of Dover International Speedway, the circuit where the race was held.

Dover International Speedway (formerly Dover Downs International Speedway) is a race track in Dover, Delaware. The track has hosted at least one NASCAR Sprint Cup Series race each year since 1969, including two per year since 1971. In addition to NASCAR, the track also hosted USAC and the Indy Racing League. The track features one layout, a 1 mile (1.6 km) concrete oval, with 24° banking in the turns and 9° banking on the straights. The speedway is owned and operated by Speedway Motorsports.

=== Entry list ===
- (R) denotes rookie driver.
- (i) denotes driver who is ineligible for series driver points.

#	Driver	Team	Make	Sponsor
00	Cole Custer	JR Motorsports	Chevrolet	Haas Automation
1	Ryan Ellis	MAKE Motorsports	Chevrolet	MAKE Motorsports
02	Tyler Young	Young's Motorsports	Chevrolet	Randco, Young's Building Systems
4	Erik Jones (R)	Kyle Busch Motorsports	Toyota	Special Olympics World Games
05	John Wes Townley	Athenian Motorsports	Chevrolet	Zaxby's
6	Norm Benning	Norm Benning Racing	Chevrolet	Norm Benning Racing
07	Ray Black Jr. (R)	SS-Green Light Racing	Chevrolet	ScubaLife.com
08	Korbin Forrister (R)	BJMM with SS-Green Light Racing	Chevrolet	Tilted Kilt
8	John Hunter Nemechek (R)	SWM-NEMCO Motorsports	Chevrolet	MeetBall
10	Jennifer Jo Cobb	Jennifer Jo Cobb Racing	Chevrolet	POW, MIAFamilies.org
11	Ben Kennedy	Red Horse Racing	Toyota	Local Motors
13	Cameron Hayley (R)	ThorSport Racing	Toyota	Carolina Nut Company
14	Daniel Hemric (R)	NTS Motorsports	Chevrolet	California Clean Power
15	Mason Mingus	Billy Boat Motorsports	Chevrolet	Call 811 Before You Dig
17	Timothy Peters	Red Horse Racing	Toyota	Red Horse Racing
19	Tyler Reddick	Brad Keselowski Racing	Ford	BBR Music Group
23	Spencer Gallagher (R)	GMS Racing	Chevrolet	Allegiant Travel Company
29	Ryan Blaney (i)	Brad Keselowski Racing	Ford	Cooper-Standard Automotive
33	Brandon Jones (R)	GMS Racing	Chevrolet	AGRA Industries
36	Tyler Tanner	MB Motorsports	Chevrolet	Mittler Bros. Machine & Tool, Ski Soda
45	B. J. McLeod	B. J. McLeod Motorsports	Chevrolet	Tilted Kilt
50	Travis Kvapil	MAKE Motorsports	Chevrolet	Burnie Grill
51	Daniel Suárez (i)	Kyle Busch Motorsports	Toyota	Arris
54	Justin Boston (R)	Kyle Busch Motorsports	Toyota	ROK Mobile
59	Kyle Martel	Bill Martel Racing	Chevrolet	Finish Line Express
63	Justin Jennings	MB Motorsports	Chevrolet	Mittler Bros. Machine & Tool, Ski Soda
74	Tim Viens	Mike Harmon Racing	Chevrolet	RaceDaySponsor.com
82	Austin Hill	Empire Racing	Ford	Empire Racing
86	Brandon Brown	Brandonbilt Motorsports	Chevrolet	Coastal Carolina University
88	Matt Crafton	ThorSport Racing	Toyota	Rip It, Menards
94	Timmy Hill	Premium Motorsports	Chevrolet	Testoril
97	Jesse Little	JJL Motorsports	Toyota	Carolina Nut Company
98	Johnny Sauter	ThorSport Racing	Toyota	Smokey Mountain Herbal Snuff
Official entry list

== Practice ==
The first and only practice session was held on Thursday, May 28, at 2:00 PM EST, and would last for 2 hours and 25 minutes. Erik Jones, driving for Kyle Busch Motorsports, would set the fastest time in the session, with a lap of 23.094, and an average speed of 155.885 mph (250.873 km/h).

Pos.	#	Driver	Team	Make	Time	Speed
1	4	Erik Jones (R)	Kyle Busch Motorsports	Toyota	23.094	155.885
2	00	Cole Custer	JR Motorsports	Chevrolet	23.253	154.819
3	51	Daniel Suárez (i)	Kyle Busch Motorsports	Toyota	23.289	154.579
Full practice results

== Qualifying ==
Qualifying was held on Friday, May 29, at 12:45 PM EST. The qualifying system used is a multi car, multi lap, three round system where in the first round, everyone would set a time to determine positions 25–32. Then, the fastest 24 qualifiers would move on to the second round to determine positions 13–24. Lastly, the fastest 12 qualifiers would move on to the third round to determine positions 1–12.

Ryan Blaney, driving for Brad Keselowski Racing, would win the pole after advancing from the preliminary rounds and setting the fastest time in Round 3, with a lap of 22.718, and an average speed of 158.465 mph (255.025 km/h).

Kyle Martel was the only driver who failed to qualify.

=== Full qualifying results ===
Pos.	#	Driver	Team	Make	Time (R1)	Speed (R1)	Time (R2)	Speed (R2)	Time (R3)	Speed (R3)
1	29	Ryan Blaney (i)	Brad Keselowski Racing	Ford	23.300	154.506	22.897	157.226	22.718	158.465
2	4	Erik Jones (R)	Kyle Busch Motorsports	Toyota	23.212	155.092	22.891	157.267	22.787	157.985
3	88	Matt Crafton	ThorSport Racing	Toyota	22.820	157.756	22.975	156.692	22.841	157.611
4	19	Tyler Reddick	Brad Keselowski Racing	Ford	23.197	155.192	22.969	156.733	22.875	157.377
5	51	Daniel Suárez (i)	Kyle Busch Motorsports	Toyota	23.191	155.233	23.017	156.406	22.959	156.801
6	8	John Hunter Nemechek (R)	SWM-NEMCO Motorsports	Chevrolet	23.252	154.825	23.141	155.568	22.987	156.610
7	13	Cameron Hayley (R)	ThorSport Racing	Toyota	23.261	154.765	23.059	156.121	23.030	156.318
8	54	Justin Boston (R)	Kyle Busch Motorsports	Toyota	23.379	153.984	23.091	155.905	23.100	155.844
9	97	Jesse Little	JJL Motorsports	Toyota	22.908	157.150	22.951	156.856	23.138	155.588
10	00	Cole Custer	JR Motorsports	Chevrolet	23.247	154.859	23.134	155.615	23.176	155.333
11	15	Mason Mingus	Billy Boat Motorsports	Chevrolet	23.360	154.110	23.138	155.588	23.195	155.206
12	33	Brandon Jones (R)	GMS Racing	Chevrolet	23.389	153.919	23.026	156.345	–	–
Eliminated in Round 2
13	23	Spencer Gallagher (R)	GMS Racing	Chevrolet	23.343	154.222	23.161	155.434	–	–
14	17	Timothy Peters	Red Horse Racing	Toyota	23.566	152.762	23.162	155.427	–	–
15	86	Brandon Brown	Brandonbilt Motorsports	Chevrolet	23.229	154.979	23.169	155.380	–	–
16	98	Johnny Sauter	ThorSport Racing	Toyota	23.409	153.787	23.229	154.979	–	–
17	05	John Wes Townley	Athenian Motorsports	Chevrolet	23.518	153.074	23.230	154.972	–	–
18	11	Ben Kennedy	Red Horse Racing	Toyota	23.665	152.123	23.245	154.872	–	–
19	14	Daniel Hemric (R)	NTS Motorsports	Chevrolet	23.340	154.242	23.263	154.752	–	–
20	07	Ray Black Jr. (R)	SS-Green Light Racing	Chevrolet	23.695	151.931	23.629	152.355	–	–
21	82	Austin Hill	Empire Racing	Ford	23.661	152.149	23.722	151.758	–	–
22	94	Timmy Hill	Premium Motorsports	Chevrolet	23.659	152.162	23.763	151.496	–	–
23	45	B. J. McLeod	B. J. McLeod Motorsports	Chevrolet	23.630	152.349	23.855	150.912	–	–
24	50	Travis Kvapil	MAKE Motorsports	Chevrolet	23.602	152.529	–	–	–	–
Eliminated in Round 1
25	02	Tyler Young	Young's Motorsports	Chevrolet	23.856	150.905	–	–	–	–
26	63	Justin Jennings	MB Motorsports	Chevrolet	23.992	150.050	–	–	–	–
27	08	Korbin Forrister (R)	BJMM with SS-Green Light Racing	Chevrolet	24.002	149.988	–	–	–	–
Qualified by owner's points
28	1	Ryan Ellis	MAKE Motorsports	Chevrolet	24.022	149.863	–	–	–	–
29	36	Tyler Tanner	MB Motorsports	Chevrolet	24.281	148.264	–	–	–	–
30	10	Jennifer Jo Cobb	Jennifer Jo Cobb Racing	Chevrolet	24.780	145.278	–	–	–	–
31	74	Tim Viens	Mike Harmon Racing	Chevrolet	25.099	143.432	–	–	–	–
32	6	Norm Benning	Norm Benning Racing	Chevrolet	27.838	129.320	–	–	–	–
Failed to qualify
33	59	Kyle Martel	Bill Martel Racing	Chevrolet	25.066	143.621	–	–	–	–
Official qualifying results
Official starting lineup

== Race results ==
Fin	St	#	Driver	Team	Make	Laps	Led	Status	Pts	Winnings
1	4	19	Tyler Reddick	Brad Keselowski Racing	Ford	200	40	Running	47	$55,620
2	5	51	Daniel Suárez (i)	Kyle Busch Motorsports	Toyota	200	0	Running	0	$33,106
3	2	4	Erik Jones (R)	Kyle Busch Motorsports	Toyota	200	50	Running	42	$32,003
4	19	14	Daniel Hemric (R)	NTS Motorsports	Chevrolet	200	0	Running	40	$23,957
5	3	88	Matt Crafton	ThorSport Racing	Toyota	200	3	Running	40	$23,604
6	18	11	Ben Kennedy	Red Horse Racing	Toyota	200	0	Running	38	$21,965
7	1	29	Ryan Blaney (i)	Brad Keselowski Racing	Ford	200	33	Running	0	$20,663
8	12	33	Brandon Jones (R)	GMS Racing	Chevrolet	200	0	Running	36	$20,060
9	16	98	Johnny Sauter	ThorSport Racing	Toyota	200	0	Running	35	$19,612
10	25	02	Tyler Young	Young's Motorsports	Chevrolet	199	0	Running	34	$20,313
11	20	07	Ray Black Jr. (R)	SS-Green Light Racing	Chevrolet	199	1	Running	34	$19,115
12	13	23	Spencer Gallagher (R)	GMS Racing	Chevrolet	199	0	Running	32	$18,810
13	10	00	Cole Custer	JR Motorsports	Chevrolet	198	67	Running	33	$16,450
14	15	86	Brandon Bown	Brandonbilt Motorsports	Chevrolet	196	0	Running	30	$16,339
15	22	94	Timmy Hill	Premium Motorsports	Chevrolet	195	0	Running	29	$18,878
16	21	82	Austin Hill	Empire Racing	Ford	192	0	Running	28	$16,317
17	27	08	Korbin Forrister (R)	BJMM with SS-Green Light Racing	Chevrolet	190	0	Running	27	$18,258
18	17	05	John Wes Townley	Athenian Motorsports	Chevrolet	178	0	Running	26	$18,147
19	24	50	Travis Kvapil	MAKE Motorsports	Chevrolet	178	0	Running	25	$15,786
20	14	17	Timothy Peters	Red Horse Racing	Toyota	136	5	Accident	25	$18,426
21	7	13	Cameron Hayley (R)	ThorSport Racing	Toyota	136	1	Running	24	$17,815
22	6	8	John Hunter Nemechek (R)	SWM-NEMCO Motorsports	Chevrolet	136	0	Running	22	$17,704
23	31	74	Tim Viens	Mike Harmon Racing	Chevrolet	127	0	Rear End	21	$17,594
24	28	1	Ryan Ellis	MAKE Motorsports	Chevrolet	90	0	Accident	20	$17,484
25	8	54	Justin Boston (R)	Kyle Busch Motorsports	Toyota	65	0	Accident	19	$16,273
26	32	6	Norm Benning	Norm Benning Racing	Chevrolet	61	0	Suspension	18	$16,012
27	23	45	B. J. McLeod	B. J. McLeod Motorsports	Chevrolet	56	0	Ignition	17	$14,902
28	26	63	Justin Jennings	MB Motorsports	Chevrolet	33	0	Accident	16	$14,570
29	11	15	Mason Mingus	Billy Boat Motorsports	Chevrolet	32	0	Accident	15	$14,432
30	9	97	Jesse Little	JJL Motorsports	Toyota	32	0	Accident	14	$13,932
31	29	36	Tyler Tanner	MB Motorsports	Chevrolet	15	0	Vibration	13	$12,432
32	30	10	Jennifer Jo Cobb	Jennifer Jo Cobb Racing	Chevrolet	12	0	Accident	12	$11,432
Official race results

== Standings after the race ==
Drivers' Championship standings

	Pos	Driver	Points
	1	Matt Crafton	217
1	2	Tyler Reddick	246 (-11)
1	3	Erik Jones	243 (–14)
	4	Johnny Sauter	217 (–40)
	5	John Wes Townley	186 (–71)
	6	Timothy Peters	183 (–74)
	7	Cameron Hayley	177 (–80)
1	8	Spencer Gallagher	177 (–80)
1	9	Daniel Hemric	176 (–81)
1	10	Ray Black Jr.	168 (–89)
Official driver's standings

- Note: Only the first 10 positions are included for the driver standings.

Previous race: 2015 North Carolina Education Lottery 200	NASCAR Camping World Truck Series; 2015 season	Next race: 2015 WinStar World Casino & Resort 400
