= 2015 North Carolina Education Lottery 200 =

5th race of the 2015 NASCAR Camping World Truck Series

Race details
- Race 5 of 23 of the 2015 NASCAR Camping World Truck Series
- Date: May 15, 2015
- Official name: 13th Annual North Carolina Education Lottery 200
- Location: Charlotte Motor Speedway, Concord, North Carolina
- Course: Permanent racing facility
- Course length: 1.5 miles (2.4 km)
- Distance: 139 laps, 208 mi (335 km)
- Scheduled distance: 134 laps, 201 mi (323 km)
- Average speed: 139.857 mph (225.078 km/h)

Pole position
Driver	Kasey Kahne	JR Motorsports
- Time: 29.778

Most laps led
Driver	Erik Jones	Kyle Busch Motorsports
- Laps: 88

Winner
No. 00	Kasey Kahne	JR Motorsports

Television in the United States
- Network: FS1
- Announcers: Mike Joy, Phil Parsons, and Michael Waltrip

Radio in the United States
- Radio: MRN

The 2015 North Carolina Education Lottery 200 was the 5th stock car race of the 2015 NASCAR Camping World Truck Series, and the 13th iteration of the event. The race was held on Friday, May 15, 2015, in Concord, North Carolina at Charlotte Motor Speedway, a 1.5 mile (2.4 km) permanent tri-oval shaped racetrack. The race was increased from 134 to 139 laps, due to a NASCAR overtime finish. In one of the closest finishes in Truck Series history, Kasey Kahne, driving for JR Motorsports, would hold off Erik Jones by .005 seconds at the checkered flag to earn his fifth career NASCAR Camping World Truck Series win, and his first of the season. Jones had dominated the majority of the race, leading a race-high 88 laps. To fill out the podium, Jones, driving for Kyle Busch Motorsports, and Matt Crafton, driving for ThorSport Racing, would finish 2nd and 3rd, respectively.

It would be the last start for Kahne in the Truck Series until 2027, when he returned to the series as a full-time driver.

== Background ==
The layout of Charlotte Motor Speedway, the circuit where the race was held.

Charlotte Motor Speedway (previously known as Lowe's Motor Speedway from 1999 to 2009) is a motorsport complex located in Concord, North Carolina, 13-mile (21 km) outside Charlotte. The complex features a 1.500 mi (2.414 km) quad oval track that hosts NASCAR racing including the prestigious Coca-Cola 600 on Memorial Day weekend, and the Bank of America Roval 400. The speedway was built in 1959 by Bruton Smith and is considered the home track for NASCAR with many race teams located in the Charlotte area. The track is owned and operated by Speedway Motorsports with Greg Walter as track president.

=== Entry list ===
- (R) denotes rookie driver.
- (i) denotes driver who is ineligible for series driver points.

#	Driver	Team	Make	Sponsor
00	Kasey Kahne (i)	JR Motorsports	Chevrolet	Haas Automation
1	Kyle Fowler (i)	MAKE Motorsports	Chevrolet	JoinAPS.com, PowerAll
02	Tyler Young	Young's Motorsports	Chevrolet	AKL Insurance Group, Young's
4	Erik Jones (R)	Kyle Busch Motorsports	Toyota	Dollar General
05	John Wes Townley	Athenian Motorsports	Chevrolet	Zaxby's
6	Norm Benning	Norm Benning Racing	Chevrolet	Norm Benning Racing
07	Ray Black Jr. (R)	SS-Green Light Racing	Chevrolet	Scuba Life
08	Korbin Forrister (R)	BJMM with SS-Green Light Racing	Chevrolet	Tilted Kilt
8	Joe Nemechek	SWM-NEMCO Motorsports	Chevrolet	FoneFuel
10	Jennifer Jo Cobb	Jennifer Jo Cobb Racing	Chevrolet	Driven2Honor.org
11	Ben Kennedy	Red Horse Racing	Toyota	Local Motors
13	Cameron Hayley (R)	ThorSport Racing	Toyota	Cabinets by Hayley
14	Daniel Hemric (R)	NTS Motorsports	Chevrolet	California Clean Power
15	Mason Mingus	Billy Boat Motorsports	Chevrolet	Call 811 Before You Dig
17	Timothy Peters	Red Horse Racing	Toyota	Red Horse Racing
19	Tyler Reddick	Brad Keselowski Racing	Ford	BBR Music Group
23	Spencer Gallagher (R)	GMS Racing	Chevrolet	Allegiant Travel Company
28	Ryan Ellis	FDNY Racing	Chevrolet	FDNY 150th Anniversary
29	Brad Keselowski (i)	Brad Keselowski Racing	Ford	Cooper Standard Careers for Veterans
31	Scott Lagasse Jr.	NTS Motorsports	Chevrolet	GunBroker.com
33	Brandon Jones (R)	GMS Racing	Chevrolet	ProStock HVAC Parts & Supplies
36	Justin Jennings	MB Motorsports	Chevrolet	Mittler Bros. Machine & Tool
40	Todd Peck	Peck Motorsports	Chevrolet	Horizon Therapeutics, Arthritis Foundation
45	B. J. McLeod	B. J. McLeod Motorsports	Chevrolet	Tilted Kilt
50	Travis Kvapil	MAKE Motorsports	Chevrolet	Burnie Grill
51	Matt Tifft	Kyle Busch Motorsports	Toyota	ToyotaCare
54	Justin Boston (R)	Kyle Busch Motorsports	Toyota	ROK Mobile
63	Tyler Tanner	MB Motorsports	Chevrolet	Mittler Bros. Machine & Tool
74	Jordan Anderson	Mike Harmon Racing	Chevrolet	Auntie Anne's, Corpe Consulting
75	Caleb Holman	Henderson Motorsports	Chevrolet	Food Country USA, Gillette Venus
86	Brandon Brown	Brandonbilt Motorsports	Chevrolet	Coastal Carolina University
88	Matt Crafton	ThorSport Racing	Toyota	Great Lakes Flooring, Menards
92	David Gilliland (i)	RBR Enterprises	Ford	Black's Tire Service, Goodyear
94	Wendell Chavous	Premium Motorsports	Chevrolet	Testoril
98	Johnny Sauter	ThorSport Racing	Toyota	Smokey Mountain Herbal Snuff
Official entry list

== Practice ==
=== First practice ===
The first practice session was held on Thursday, May 14, at 3:00 PM EST, and would last for 2 hours and 55 minutes. Kasey Kahne, driving for JR Motorsports, would set the fastest time in the session, with a lap of 29.957, and an average speed of 180.258 mph (290.097 km/h).

Pos.	#	Driver	Team	Make	Time	Speed
1	00	Kasey Kahne (i)	JR Motorsports	Chevrolet	29.957	180.258
2	8	Joe Nemechek	SWM-NEMCO Motorsports	Chevrolet	30.024	179.856
3	14	Daniel Hemric (R)	NTS Motorsports	Chevrolet	30.070	179.581
Full first practice results

=== Final practice ===
The final practice session was held on Thursday, May 14, at 7:00 PM EST, and would last for 1 hour and 55 minutes. Erik Jones, driving for Kyle Busch Motorsports, would set the fastest time in the session, with a lap of 29.885, and an average speed of 180.693 mph (290.797 km/h).

Pos.	#	Driver	Team	Make	Time	Speed
1	4	Erik Jones (R)	Kyle Busch Motorsports	Toyota	29.885	180.693
2	31	Scott Lagasse Jr.	NTS Motorsports	Chevrolet	29.889	180.668
3	51	Matt Tifft	Kyle Busch Motorsports	Toyota	29.899	180.608
Full final practice results

== Qualifying ==
Qualifying was held on Friday, May 15, at 5:45 PM EST. The qualifying system used is a multi car, multi lap, three round system where in the first round, everyone would set a time to determine positions 25–32. Then, the fastest 24 qualifiers would move on to the second round to determine positions 13–24. Lastly, the fastest 12 qualifiers would move on to the third round to determine positions 1–12.

Kasey Kahne, driving for JR Motorsports, would win the pole after advancing from the preliminary rounds and setting the fastest time in Round 3, with a lap of 29.778, and an average speed of 181.342 mph (291.842 km/h).

Brandon Brown, Ryan Ellis, and Todd Peck would fail to qualify.

=== Full qualifying results ===
Pos.	#	Driver	Team	Make	Time (R1)	Speed (R1)	Time (R2)	Speed (R2)	Time (R3)	Speed (R3)
1	00	Kasey Kahne (i)	JR Motorsports	Chevrolet	30.121	179.277	–	–	29.778	181.342
2	4	Erik Jones (R)	Kyle Busch Motorsports	Toyota	29.973	180.162	30.047	179.718	29.833	181.008
3	51	Matt Tifft	Kyle Busch Motorsports	Toyota	30.140	179.164	29.960	180.240	29.915	180.511
4	29	Brad Keselowski (i)	Brad Keselowski Racing	Ford	30.336	178.006	30.100	179.402	29.917	180.499
5	14	Daniel Hemric (R)	NTS Motorsports	Chevrolet	30.421	177.509	30.169	178.992	29.955	180.270
6	31	Scott Lagasse Jr.	NTS Motorsports	Chevrolet	30.493	177.090	30.317	178.118	29.968	180.192
7	19	Tyler Reddick	Brad Keselowski Racing	Ford	29.881	180.717	29.963	180.222	30.125	179.253
8	07	Ray Black Jr. (R)	SS-Green Light Racing	Chevrolet	30.516	176.956	30.375	177.778	30.237	178.589
9	88	Matt Crafton	ThorSport Racing	Toyota	30.096	179.426	30.355	177.895	30.378	177.760
10	11	Ben Kennedy	Red Horse Racing	Toyota	30.306	178.183	30.405	177.602	30.521	176.927
11	05	John Wes Townley	Athenian Motorsports	Chevrolet	30.171	178.980	30.245	178.542	30.525	176.904
12	08	Korbin Forrister (R)	BJMM with SS-Green Light Racing	Chevrolet	30.936	174.554	31.344	172.282	31.471	171.587
Eliminated in Round 2
13	13	Cameron Hayley (R)	ThorSport Racing	Toyota	30.500	177.049	–	–	–	–
14	92	David Gilliland (i)	RBR Enterprises	Ford	30.481	177.160	–	–	–	–
15	33	Brandon Jones (R)	GMS Racing	Chevrolet	30.321	178.094	–	–	–	–
16	8	Joe Nemechek	SWM-NEMCO Motorsports	Chevrolet	30.522	176.922	–	–	–	–
17	17	Timothy Peters	Red Horse Racing	Toyota	30.401	177.626	–	–	–	–
18	23	Spencer Gallagher (R)	GMS Racing	Chevrolet	30.077	179.539	–	–	–	–
19	98	Johnny Sauter	ThorSport Racing	Toyota	30.376	177.772	–	–	–	–
20	02	Tyler Young	Young's Motorsports	Chevrolet	30.779	175.444	–	–	–	–
21	15	Mason Mingus	Billy Boat Motorsports	Chevrolet	30.620	176.355	–	–	–	–
22	54	Justin Boston (R)	Kyle Busch Motorsports	Toyota	30.210	178.749	–	–	–	–
23	63	Tyler Tanner	MB Motorsports	Chevrolet	30.674	176.045	–	–	–	–
24	36	Justin Jennings	MB Motorsports	Chevrolet	30.770	175.496	–	–	–	–
Eliminated in Round 1
25	45	B. J. McLeod	B. J. McLeod Motorsports	Chevrolet	30.965	174.390	–	–	–	–
26	75	Caleb Holman	Henderson Motorsports	Chevrolet	31.025	174.053	–	–	–	–
27	74	Jordan Anderson	Mike Harmon Racing	Chevrolet	31.033	174.008	–	–	–	–
Qualified by owner's points
28	94	Wendell Chavous	Premium Motorsports	Chevrolet	31.139	173.416	–	–	–	–
29	1	Kyle Fowler (i)	MAKE Motorsports	Chevrolet	31.199	173.082	–	–	–	–
30	10	Jennifer Jo Cobb	Jennifer Jo Cobb Racing	Chevrolet	31.240	172.855	–	–	–	–
31	50	Travis Kvapil	MAKE Motorsports	Chevrolet	31.403	171.958	–	–	–	–
32	6	Norm Benning	Norm Benning Racing	Chevrolet	35.252	153.183	–	–	–	–
Failed to qualify
33	86	Brandon Brown	Brandonbilt Motorsports	Chevrolet	31.086	173.712	–	–	–	–
34	28	Ryan Ellis	FDNY Racing	Chevrolet	31.458	171.657	–	–	–	–
35	40	Todd Peck	Peck Motorsports	Chevrolet	31.499	171.434	–	–	–	–
Official qualifying results
Official starting lineup

== Race results ==
Fin	St	#	Driver	Team	Make	Laps	Led	Status	Pts	Winnings
1	1	00	Kasey Kahne (i)	JR Motorsports	Chevrolet	139	21	Running	0	$48,454
2	2	4	Erik Jones (R)	Kyle Busch Motorsports	Toyota	139	88	Running	44	$36,563
3	9	88	Matt Crafton	ThorSport Racing	Toyota	139	24	Running	42	$26,622
4	7	19	Tyler Reddick	Brad Keselowski Racing	Ford	139	1	Running	41	$22,672
5	4	29	Brad Keselowski (i)	Brad Keselowski Racing	Ford	139	4	Running	0	$17,402
6	11	05	John Wes Townley	Athenian Motorsports	Chevrolet	139	0	Running	38	$17,157
7	17	17	Timothy Peters	Red Horse Racing	Toyota	139	0	Running	37	$16,592
8	3	51	Matt Tifft	Kyle Busch Motorsports	Toyota	139	0	Running	36	$16,481
9	22	54	Justin Boston (R)	Kyle Busch Motorsports	Toyota	139	0	Running	35	$16,342
10	18	23	Spencer Gallagher (R)	GMS Racing	Chevrolet	139	0	Running	34	$17,182
11	16	8	Joe Nemechek	SWM-NEMCO Motorsports	Chevrolet	139	0	Running	33	$15,761
12	6	31	Scott Lagasse Jr. (i)	NTS Motorsports	Chevrolet	139	0	Running	0	$15,566
13	15	33	Brandon Jones (R)	GMS Racing	Chevrolet	139	0	Running	31	$15,427
14	13	13	Cameron Hayley (R)	ThorSport Racing	Toyota	139	0	Running	30	$15,316
15	19	98	Johnny Sauter	ThorSport Racing	Toyota	139	0	Running	29	$15,606
16	10	11	Ben Kennedy	Red Horse Racing	Toyota	139	0	Running	28	$15,295
17	5	14	Daniel Hemric (R)	NTS Motorsports	Chevrolet	139	0	Running	27	$15,040
18	20	02	Tyler Young	Young's Motorsports	Chevrolet	138	0	Running	26	$14,984
19	30	10	Jennifer Jo Cobb	Jennifer Jo Cobb Racing	Chevrolet	137	0	Running	25	$14,929
20	29	1	Kyle Fowler (i)	MAKE Motorsports	Chevrolet	136	0	Running	0	$15,373
21	23	63	Tyler Tanner	MB Motorsports	Chevrolet	136	0	Running	23	$13,546
22	8	07	Ray Black Jr. (R)	SS-Green Light Racing	Chevrolet	135	0	Running	22	$13,485
23	27	74	Jordan Anderson	Mike Harmon Racing	Chevrolet	135	0	Running	21	$12,457
24	26	75	Caleb Holman	Henderson Motorsports	Chevrolet	133	0	Running	20	$12,430
25	28	94	Wendell Chavous	Premium Motorsports	Chevrolet	132	0	Engine	19	$12,525
26	21	15	Mason Mingus	Billy Boat Motorsports	Chevrolet	114	0	Accident	18	$12,347
27	14	92	David Gilliland (i)	RBR Enterprises	Ford	84	0	Vibration	0	$12,318
28	31	50	Travis Kvapil	MAKE Motorsports	Chevrolet	62	0	Accident	16	$12,071
29	12	08	Korbin Forrister (R)	BJMM with SS-Green Light Racing	Chevrolet	38	0	Steering Box	15	$12,016
30	24	36	Justin Jennings	MB Motorsports	Chevrolet	33	1	Electrical	14	$11,516
31	25	45	B. J. McLeod	B. J. McLeod Motorsports	Chevrolet	26	0	Electrical	13	$10,016
32	32	6	Norm Benning	Norm Benning Racing	Chevrolet	9	0	Suspension	12	$9,016
Official race results

== Standings after the race ==
Drivers' Championship standings

	Pos	Driver	Points
	1	Matt Crafton	217
1	2	Erik Jones	201 (-16)
1	3	Tyler Reddick	199 (–18)
	4	Johnny Sauter	182 (–35)
1	5	John Wes Townley	160 (–57)
1	6	Timothy Peters	158 (–59)
2	7	Cameron Hayley	153 (–64)
	8	Justin Boston	149 (–68)
1	9	Spencer Gallagher	145 (–72)
1	10	Daniel Hemric	136 (–81)
Official driver's standings

- Note: Only the first 10 positions are included for the driver standings.

Previous race: 2015 Toyota Tundra 250	NASCAR Camping World Truck Series; 2015 season	Next race: 2015 Lucas Oil 200
