= 2015 NextEra Energy Resources 250 =

1st race of the 2015 NASCAR Camping World Truck Series

Race details
- Race 1 of 23 of the 2015 NASCAR Camping World Truck Series
- Date: February 20, 2015
- Official name: 16th Annual NextEra Energy Resources 250
- Location: Daytona International Speedway, Daytona Beach, Florida
- Course: Permanent racing facility
- Course length: 2.5 miles (4.0 km)
- Distance: 100 laps, 250 mi (400 km)
- Scheduled distance: 100 laps, 250 mi (400 km)
- Average speed: 128.480 mph (206.769 km/h)

Pole position
Driver	Ty Dillon	GMS Racing
- Time: 47.676

Most laps led
Driver	Tyler Reddick	Brad Keselowski Racing
- Laps: 46

Winner
No. 19	Tyler Reddick	Brad Keselowski Racing

Television in the United States
- Network: FS1
- Announcers: Mike Joy, Phil Parsons, and Michael Waltrip

Radio in the United States
- Radio: MRN

The 2015 NextEra Energy Resources 250 was the 1st stock car race of the 2015 NASCAR Camping World Truck Series season, and the 16th iteration of the event. The race was held on Friday, February 20, 2015, in Daytona Beach, Florida, at Daytona International Speedway, a 2.5 miles (4.02 km) permanent tri-oval shaped superspeedway. The race took the scheduled 100 laps to complete. Tyler Reddick, driving for Brad Keselowski Racing, would hold off a fast-charging Erik Jones on the final lap, and earned his first career NASCAR Camping World Truck Series win. Reddick would dominate a portion of the race, leading 46 laps. To fill out the podium, Jones, driving for Kyle Busch Motorsports, and Scott Lagasse Jr., driving for NTS Motorsports, would finish 2nd and 3rd, respectively.

== Background ==
The layout of Daytona International Speedway, the circuit where the race was held.

Daytona International Speedway is one of three superspeedways to hold NASCAR races, the other two being Indianapolis Motor Speedway and Talladega Superspeedway. The standard track at Daytona International Speedway is a four-turn superspeedway that is 2.5 miles (4.0 km) long. The track's turns are banked at 31 degrees, while the front stretch, the location of the finish line, is banked at 18 degrees.

=== Entry list ===
- (R) denotes rookie driver.
- (i) denotes driver who is ineligible for series driver points.

#	Driver	Team	Make	Sponsor
1	Donnie Neuenberger	MAKE Motorsports	Chevrolet	Eagle Convenience Stores
02	Tyler Young	Young's Motorsports	Chevrolet	AKL Insurance Group, Randco
4	Erik Jones (R)	Kyle Busch Motorsports	Toyota	Toyota
05	John Wes Townley	Athenian Motorsports	Chevrolet	Zaxby's
6	Norm Benning	Norm Benning Racing	Chevrolet	Norm Benning Racing
07	Ray Black Jr. (R)	SS-Green Light Racing	Chevrolet	ScubaLife
08	Korbin Forrister (R)	BJMM with SS-Green Light Racing	Chevrolet	Tilted Kilt
8	Joe Nemechek	SWM-NEMCO Motorpsorts	Chevrolet	D. A. B. Constructors
10	Jennifer Jo Cobb	Jennifer Jo Cobb Racing	Chevrolet	Driven2Honor.org
11	Ben Kennedy	Red Horse Racing	Toyota	Local Motors
13	Cameron Hayley (R)	ThorSport Racing	Toyota	Cabinets by Hayley
14	Daniel Hemric (R)	NTS Motorsports	Chevrolet	California Clean Power
15	Mason Mingus	Billy Boat Motorsports	Chevrolet	Call 811 Before You Dig
17	Timothy Peters	Red Horse Racing	Toyota	Red Horse Racing
19	Tyler Reddick	Brad Keselowski Racing	Ford	DrawTite
20	Scott Lagasse Jr. (i)	NTS Motorsports	Chevrolet	Alert Today Florida, Boy Scouts of America
23	Spencer Gallagher (R)	GMS Racing	Chevrolet	Allegiant Travel Company
25	Matt Tifft	Venturini Motorsports	Toyota	Federated Auto Parts
28	Ryan Ellis	FDNY Racing	Chevrolet	FDNY
29	Austin Theriault (R)	Brad Keselowski Racing	Ford	Cooper Standard Careers for Veterans
31	James Buescher	NTS Motorsports	Chevrolet	GunBroker.com
33	Ty Dillon (i)	GMS Racing	Chevrolet	Rheem, Gemaire
35	Justin Marks (i)	Win-Tron Racing	Toyota	American Born Moonshine, GoPro Motorplex
40	Todd Peck	Peck Motorsports	Chevrolet	Arthritis Foundation
50	Cody Ware	MAKE Motorsports	Chevrolet	Burnie Grill, Bubba Burger, Lilly Trucking
51	Daniel Suárez (i)	Kyle Busch Motorsports	Toyota	Arris
54	Justin Boston (R)	Kyle Busch Motorsports	Toyota	BitPay
63	Justin Jennings	MB Motorsports	Chevrolet	SEGPAY
68	Clay Greenfield	Clay Greenfield Motorsports	Chevrolet	1-800-PAVEMENT
74	Jordan Anderson	Mike Harmon Racing	Chevrolet	Tri-Analytics
82	Austin Hill	Empire Racing	Ford	A&D Welding
84	Chris Fontaine	Glenden Enterprises	Toyota	Glenden Enterprises
88	Matt Crafton	ThorSport Racing	Toyota	Damp-Rid, Menards
92	David Gilliland (i)	RBR Enterprises	Ford	Black's Tire Service, Goodyear
94	Travis Kvapil	Premium Motorsports	Chevrolet	Chargebacks 911
98	Johnny Sauter	ThorSport Racing	Toyota	Smokey Mountain Herbal Snuff
99	Bryan Silas	T3R2	Chevrolet	Kapoya Premium Energy Drink
Official entry list

== Practice ==
=== First practice ===
The first practice session was held on Thursday, February 19, at 1:30 PM EST, and would last for 55 minutes. Austin Hill, driving for Empire Racing, would set the fastest time in the session, with a lap of 47.743, and an average speed of 188.509 mph (303.376 km/h).

Pos.	#	Driver	Team	Make	Time	Speed
1	82	Austin Hill	Empire Racing	Ford	47.743	188.509
2	94	Travis Kvapil	Premium Motorsports	Chevrolet	47.766	188.419
3	05	John Wes Townley	Athenian Motorsports	Chevrolet	47.851	188.084
Full first practice results

=== Final practice ===
The final practice session was held on Thursday, February 19, at 3:30 PM EST, and would last for 1 hour and 25 minutes. Johnny Sauter, driving for ThorSport Racing, would set the fastest time in the session, with a lap of 47.215, and an average speed of 190.617 mph (306.768 km/h).

Pos.	#	Driver	Team	Make	Time	Speed
1	98	Johnny Sauter	ThorSport Racing	Toyota	47.215	190.617
2	13	Cameron Hayley (R)	ThorSport Racing	Toyota	47.378	189.962
3	29	Austin Theriault (R)	Brad Keselowski Racing	Ford	47.457	189.645
Full final practice results

== Qualifying ==
Qualifying was held on Friday, February 20, at 4:45 PM EST. The qualifying system used is a multi car, multi lap, three round system where in the first round, everyone would set a time to determine positions 25–32. Then, the fastest 24 qualifiers would move on to the second round to determine positions 13–24. Lastly, the fastest 12 qualifiers would move on to the third round to determine positions 1–12.

Ty Dillon, driving for GMS Racing, would win the pole after advancing from the preliminary rounds and setting the fastest time in Round 3, with a lap of 49.676 and an average speed of 188.774 mph (303.802 km/h).

Mason Mingus, Justin Jennings, Cody Ware, Clay Greenfield, and Jordan Anderson would fail to qualify.

=== Full qualifying results ===
Pos.	#	Driver	Team	Make	Time (R1)	Speed (R1)	Time (R2)	Speed (R2)	Time (R3)	Speed (R3)
1	33	Ty Dillon (i)	GMS Racing	Chevrolet	48.642	185.025	47.345	190.094	47.676	188.774
2	94	Travis Kvapil	Premium Motorsports	Chevrolet	48.460	185.720	47.610	189.036	47.693	188.707
3	19	Tyler Reddick	Brad Keselowski Racing	Ford	48.614	185.132	47.556	189.251	47.841	188.123
4	29	Austin Theriault (R)	Brad Keselowski Racing	Ford	48.654	184.980	47.516	189.410	47.927	187.786
5	31	James Buescher	NTS Motorsports	Chevrolet	48.662	184.949	47.344	190.098	48.049	187.309
6	11	Ben Kennedy	Red Horse Racing	Toyota	48.233	186.594	47.380	189.954	48.097	187.122
7	4	Erik Jones (R)	Kyle Busch Motorsports	Toyota	48.456	185.736	47.524	189.378	48.105	187.091
8	84	Chris Fontaine	Glenden Enterprises	Toyota	48.496	185.582	47.544	189.298	48.106	187.087
9	20	Scott Lagasse Jr. (i)	NTS Motorsports	Chevrolet	48.629	185.075	47.576	189.171	48.108	187.079
10	23	Spencer Gallagher (R)	GMS Racing	Chevrolet	48.628	185.079	47.332	190.146	50.114	179.591
11	10	Jennifer Jo Cobb	Jennifer Jo Cobb Racing	Chevrolet	48.412	185.904	47.353	190.062	50.937	176.689
12	1	Donnie Neuenberger	MAKE Motorsports	Chevrolet	48.407	185.924	47.376	189.970	50.969	176.578
Eliminated in Round 2
13	92	David Gilliland (i)	RBR Enterprises	Ford	48.447	185.770	48.171	186.834	-	-
14	13	Cameron Hayley (R)	ThorSport Racing	Toyota	48.217	186.656	48.202	186.714	-	-
15	07	Ray Black Jr. (R)	SS-Green Light Racing	Chevrolet	48.389	185.993	48.587	185.235	-	-
16	25	Matt Tifft	Venturini Motorsports	Toyota	48.449	185.762	48.668	184.926	-	-
17	82	Austin Hill	Empire Racing	Ford	48.441	185.793	48.835	184.294	-	-
18	8	Joe Nemechek	SWM-NEMCO Motorsports	Chevrolet	48.368	186.073	49.094	183.322	-	-
19	98	Johnny Sauter	ThorSport Racing	Toyota	48.227	186.617	49.095	183.318	-	-
20	14	Daniel Hemric (R)	NTS Motorsports	Chevrolet	48.662	184.949	50.520	178.147	-	-
21	28	Ryan Ellis	FDNY Racing	Chevrolet	48.404	185.935	52.760	170.584	-	-
22	6	Norm Benning	Norm Benning Racing	Chevrolet	48.403	185.939	-	-	-	-
23	08	Korbin Forrister (R)	BJMM with SS-Green Light Racing	Chevrolet	48.406	185.927	-	-	-	-
24	40	Todd Peck	Peck Motorsports	Chevrolet	48.410	185.912	-	-	-	-
Eliminated in Round 1
25	54	Justin Boston (R)	Kyle Busch Motorsports	Toyota	49.038	183.531	-	-	-	-
26	05	John Wes Townley	Athenian Motorsports	Chevrolet	49.043	183.512	-	-	-	-
27	35	Justin Marks (i)	Win-Tron Racing	Toyota	49.045	183.505	-	-	-	-
Qualified by owner's points
28	99	Bryan Silas	T3R2	Chevrolet	49.189	182.968	-	-	-	-
29	02	Tyler Young	Young's Motorsports	Chevrolet	49.295	182.574	-	-	-	-
30	51	Daniel Suárez (i)	Kyle Busch Motorsports	Toyota	50.883	176.876	-	-	-	-
31	88	Matt Crafton	ThorSport Racing	Toyota	51.044	176.318	-	-	-	-
32	17	Timothy Peters	Red Horse Racing	Toyota	-	-	-	-	-	-
Failed to qualify
33	15	Mason Mingus	Billy Boat Motorsports	Chevrolet	50.148	179.469	-	-	-	-
34	63	Justin Jennings	MB Motorsports	Chevrolet	50.663	177.644	-	-	-	-
35	50	Cody Ware	MAKE Motorsports	Chevrolet	50.971	176.571	-	-	-	-
36	68	Clay Greenfield	Clay Greenfield Motorsports	Chevrolet	52.409	171.726	-	-	-	-
37	74	Jordan Anderson	Mike Harmon Racing	Chevrolet	52.766	170.564	-	-	-	-
Official qualifying results
Official starting lineup

== Race results ==
Fin	St	#	Driver	Team	Make	Laps	Led	Status	Pts	Winnings
1	3	19	Tyler Reddick	Brad Keselowski Racing	Ford	100	46	Running	48	$91,804
2	7	4	Erik Jones (R)	Kyle Busch Motorsports	Toyota	100	0	Running	42	$58,057
3	9	20	Scott Lagasse Jr. (i)	NTS Motorsports	Chevrolet	100	0	Running	0	$42,138
4	4	29	Austin Theriault (R)	Brad Keselowski Racing	Ford	100	9	Running	41	$32,221
5	15	07	Ray Black Jr. (R)	SS-Green Light Racing	Chevrolet	100	0	Running	39	$26,294
6	13	92	David Gilliland (i)	RBR Enterprises	Ford	100	1	Running	0	$22,729
7	28	99	Bryan Silas	T3R2	Chevrolet	100	0	Running	37	$22,981
8	31	88	Matt Crafton	ThorSport Racing	Toyota	100	1	Running	37	$22,883
9	9	51	Daniel Suárez (i)	Kyle Busch Motorsports	Toyota	100	5	Running	0	$20,786
10	19	98	Johnny Sauter	ThorSport Racing	Toyota	100	0	Running	34	$20,638
11	1	33	Ty Dillon (i)	GMS Racing	Chevrolet	100	37	Running	0	$19,673
12	23	08	Korbin Forrister (R)	BJMM with SS-Green Light Racing	Chevrolet	100	0	Running	32	$19,430
13	29	02	Tyler Young	Young's Motorsports	Chevrolet	100	1	Running	32	$17,050
14	22	6	Norm Benning	Norm Benning Racing	Chevrolet	100	0	Running	30	$19,171
15	2	94	Travis Kvapil	Premium Motorsports	Chevrolet	93	0	Running	29	$17,192
16	21	28	Ryan Ellis	FDNY Racing	Chevrolet	87	0	Accident	28	$16,798
17	5	31	James Buescher	NTS Motorsports	Chevrolet	85	0	Running	27	$16,469
18	11	10	Jennifer Jo Cobb	Jennifer Jo Cobb Racing	Chevrolet	77	0	Running	26	$18,590
19	16	25	Matt Tifft	Venturini Motorsports	Toyota	64	0	Rear Hub	25	$18,461
20	18	8	Joe Nemechek	SWM-NEMCO Motorsports	Chevrolet	62	0	Running	24	$18,896
21	10	23	Spencer Gallagher (R)	GMS Racing	Chevrolet	61	0	Running	23	$18,267
22	26	05	John Wes Townley	Athenian Motorsports	Chevrolet	48	0	Accident	22	$18,138
23	14	13	Cameron Hayley (R)	ThorSport Racing	Toyota	48	0	Accident	21	$18,009
24	32	17	Timothy Peters	Red Horse Racing	Toyota	48	0	Accident	20	$17,879
25	8	84	Chris Fontaine	Glenden Enterprises	Toyota	48	0	Accident	19	$15,650
26	20	14	Daniel Hemric (R)	NTS Motorsports	Chevrolet	48	0	Accident	18	$16,435
27	24	40	Todd Peck	Peck Motorsports	Chevrolet	48	0	Accident	17	$15,241
28	6	11	Ben Kennedy	Red Horse Racing	Toyota	20	0	Accident	16	$15,661
29	25	54	Justin Boston (R)	Kyle Busch Motorsports	Toyota	18	0	Accident	15	$14,550
30	17	82	Austin Hill	Empire Racing	Ford	13	0	Accident	14	$14,050
31	12	1	Donnie Neuenberger	MAKE Motorsports	Chevrolet	13	0	Accident	13	$12,550
32	27	35	Justin Marks (i)	Win-Tron Racing	Toyota	12	0	Accident	0	$11,550
Official race results

== Standings after the race ==
Drivers' Championship standings

Pos	Driver	Points
1	Tyler Reddick	48
2	Erik Jones	42 (-6)
3	Austin Theriault	41 (–7)
4	Ray Black Jr.	39 (–9)
5	Bryan Silas	37 (–11)
6	Matt Crafton	37 (–11)
7	Johnny Sauter	34 (–14)
8	Korbin Forrister	32 (–16)
9	Tyler Young	32 (–16)
10	Norm Benning	30 (–18)
Official driver's standings

- Note: Only the first 10 positions are included for the driver standings.

Previous race: 2014 Ford EcoBoost 200	NASCAR Camping World Truck Series; 2015 season	Next race: 2015 Hyundai Construction Equipment 200
