= 2016 Pocono Mountains 150 =

12th race of the 2016 NASCAR Camping World Truck Series

Race details
- Race 12 of 23 of the 2016 NASCAR Camping World Truck Series
- Date: July 30, 2016
- Official name: 7th Annual Pocono Mountains 150
- Location: Pocono Raceway, Long Pond, Pennsylvania
- Course: Permanent racing facility
- Course length: 1.5 miles (2.4 km)
- Distance: 60 laps, 150 mi (241 km)
- Scheduled distance: 60 laps, 150 mi (241 km)
- Average speed: 99.174 mph (159.605 km/h)

Pole position
Driver	William Byron	Kyle Busch Motorsports
- Grid positions set by competition-based formula

Most laps led
Driver	William Byron	Kyle Busch Motorsports
- Laps: 44

Winner
No. 9	William Byron	Kyle Busch Motorsports

Television in the United States
- Network: FS1
- Announcers: Vince Welch, Phil Parsons, and Michael Waltrip

Radio in the United States
- Radio: MRN

The 2016 Pocono Mountains 150 was the 12th stock car race of the 2016 NASCAR Camping World Truck Series, and the 7th iteration of the event. The race was held on Saturday, July 30, 2016, in Long Pond, Pennsylvania, at Pocono Raceway, a 1.5-mile (2.4 km) permanent triangle-shaped racetrack. The race took the scheduled 60 laps to complete. William Byron, driving for Kyle Busch Motorsports, held off the field on the final restart with 4 laps to go, and earned his fifth career NASCAR Camping World Truck Series win, breaking the record for the most wins in a single truck series season by a rookie. Byron also dominated the race, leading 44 of the 60 laps. To fill out the podium, Cameron Hayley, driving for ThorSport Racing, and Brett Moffitt, driving for Red Horse Racing, would finish 2nd and 3rd, respectively.

== Background ==
The layout of Pocono Raceway, the venue where the race was held.

Pocono Raceway (formerly Pocono International Raceway), also known as The Tricky Triangle, is a superspeedway located in the Pocono Mountains in Long Pond, Pennsylvania. It is the site of three NASCAR national series races and an ARCA Menards Series event in July: a NASCAR Cup Series race with support events by the NASCAR Xfinity Series and NASCAR Camping World Truck Series. From 1971 to 1989, and from 2013 to 2019, the track also hosted an Indy Car race, currently sanctioned by the IndyCar Series. Additionally, from 1982 to 2021, it hosted two NASCAR Cup Series races, with the traditional first date being removed for 2022.

Pocono is one of the few NASCAR tracks not owned by either NASCAR or Speedway Motorsports, the dominant track owners in NASCAR. Pocono CEO Nick Igdalsky and president Ben May are members of the family-owned Mattco Inc, started by Joseph II and Rose Mattioli. Mattco also owns South Boston Speedway in South Boston, Virginia.

=== Entry list ===
- (R) denotes rookie driver.
- (i) denotes driver who is ineligible for series driver points.

#	Driver	Team	Make	Sponsor
00	Cole Custer (R)	JR Motorsports	Chevrolet	Haas Automation
1	Jennifer Jo Cobb	Jennifer Jo Cobb Racing	Chevrolet	PitStopsforHope.org
02	Austin Hill	Austin Hill Racing	Ford	Austin Hill Racing
4	Christopher Bell (R)	Kyle Busch Motorsports	Toyota	SiriusXM
05	John Wes Townley	Athenian Motorsports	Chevrolet	Zaxby's, Jive Communications
6	Sean Corr	Norm Benning Racing	Chevrolet	Churchill Transport
07	Todd Peck (i)	SS-Green Light Racing	Chevrolet	BoobiTrap.com
8	John Hunter Nemechek	NEMCO Motorsports	Chevrolet	NEMCO Motorsports
9	William Byron (R)	Kyle Busch Motorsports	Toyota	Liberty University
10	Caleb Roark	Jennifer Jo Cobb Racing	Chevrolet	PitStopsforHope.org
11	Brett Moffitt	Red Horse Racing	Toyota	Red Horse Racing
13	Cameron Hayley	ThorSport Racing	Toyota	Cabinets by Hayley
17	Timothy Peters	Red Horse Racing	Toyota	Red Horse Racing
19	Daniel Hemric	Brad Keselowski Racing	Ford	Blue Gate Bank
21	Johnny Sauter	GMS Racing	Chevrolet	Allegiant Travel Company
22	Austin Wayne Self (R)	AM Racing	Toyota	AM Technical Solutions
23	Spencer Gallagher	GMS Racing	Chevrolet	Chapel of the Flowers
28	Ryan Ellis (i)	FDNY Racing	Chevrolet	FDNY
29	Tyler Reddick	Brad Keselowski Racing	Ford	Cooper-Standard Automotive
33	Ben Kennedy	GMS Racing	Chevrolet	Jacob Companies
41	Ben Rhodes (R)	ThorSport Racing	Toyota	Alpha Energy Solutions
44	Tommy Joe Martins	Martins Motorsports	Chevrolet	Cross Concrete Construction
49	Reed Sorenson (i)	Premium Motorsports	Chevrolet	Premium Motorsports
50	Travis Kvapil	MAKE Motorsports	Chevrolet	CorvetteParts.net
51	Cody Coughlin (R)	Kyle Busch Motorsports	Toyota	Jegs High Performance, Mishimoto
59	Kyle Martel	Bill Martel Racing	Chevrolet	Finish Line Express
63	Norm Benning	Norm Benning Racing	Chevrolet	Churchill Transport
66	Jordan Anderson	Bolen Motorsports	Chevrolet	Columbia SC - Famously Hot
71	Carlos Contreras	Contreras Motorsports	Chevrolet	American Club
86	Brandon Brown	Brandonbilt Motorsports	Chevrolet	Coastal Carolina University
88	Matt Crafton	ThorSport Racing	Toyota	Ideal Door, Menards
98	Rico Abreu (R)	ThorSport Racing	Toyota	Safelite, Curb Records
Official entry list

== Practice ==
=== First practice ===
The first practice session was held on Friday, July 29, at 12:30 pm EST, and would last for 1 hour and 25 minutes. William Byron, driving for Kyle Busch Motorsports, would set the fastest time in the session, with a lap of 53.176, and an average speed of 169.249 mph (272.380 km/h).

Pos.	#	Driver	Team	Make	Time	Speed
1	9	William Byron (R)	Kyle Busch Motorsports	Toyota	53.176	169.249
2	17	Timothy Peters	Red Horse Racing	Toyota	53.829	167.196
3	4	Christopher Bell (R)	Kyle Busch Motorsports	Toyota	53.997	166.676
Full first practice results

=== Final practice ===
The final practice session was held on Friday, July 29, at 3:00 pm EST, and would last for 55 minutes. John Hunter Nemechek, driving for NEMCO Motorsports, would set the fastest time in the session, with a lap of 53.231, and an average speed of 169.074 mph (272.098 km/h).

Pos.	#	Driver	Team	Make	Time	Speed
1	8	John Hunter Nemechek	NEMCO Motorsports	Chevrolet	53.231	169.074
2	41	Ben Rhodes (R)	ThorSport Racing	Toyota	53.245	169.030
3	9	William Byron (R)	Kyle Busch Motorsports	Toyota	53.564	168.023
Full final practice results

== Qualifying ==
Qualifying was originally going to be held on Saturday, July 30, at 9:15 am EST. Since Pocono Raceway is at least 1.5 miles (2.4 km) in length, the qualifying system was a single car, single lap, two round system where in the first round, everyone would set a time to determine positions 13–32. Then, the fastest 12 qualifiers would move on to the second round to determine positions 1–12.

Qualifying was cancelled due to inclement weather. The starting lineup would be determined by practice speeds. As a result, William Byron, driving for Kyle Busch Motorsports, would earn the pole for the race.

=== Starting lineup ===
Pos.	#	Driver	Team	Make
1	9	William Byron (R)	Kyle Busch Motorsports	Toyota
2	8	John Hunter Nemechek	NEMCO Motorsports	Chevrolet
3	41	Ben Rhodes (R)	ThorSport Racing	Toyota
4	29	Tyler Reddick	Brad Keselowski Racing	Ford
5	4	Christopher Bell (R)	Kyle Busch Motorsports	Toyota
6	02	Austin Hill	Austin Hill Racing	Ford
7	17	Timothy Peters	Red Horse Racing	Toyota
8	51	Cody Coughlin (R)	Kyle Busch Motorsports	Toyota
9	33	Ben Kennedy	GMS Racing	Chevrolet
10	13	Cameron Hayley	ThorSport Racing	Toyota
11	21	Johnny Sauter	GMS Racing	Chevrolet
12	23	Spencer Gallagher	GMS Racing	Chevrolet
13	05	John Wes Townley	Athenian Motorsports	Chevrolet
14	19	Daniel Hemric	Brad Keselowski Racing	Ford
15	11	Brett Moffitt	Red Horse Racing	Toyota
16	00	Cole Custer (R)	JR Motorsports	Chevrolet
17	98	Rico Abreu (R)	ThorSport Racing	Toyota
18	66	Jordan Anderson	Bolen Motorsports	Chevrolet
19	86	Brandon Brown	Brandonbilt Motorsports	Chevrolet
20	88	Matt Crafton	ThorSport Racing	Toyota
21	22	Austin Wayne Self (R)	AM Racing	Toyota
22	49	Reed Sorenson (i)	Premium Motorsports	Chevrolet
23	44	Tommy Joe Martins	Martins Motorsports	Chevrolet
24	71	Carlos Contreras	Contreras Motorsports	Chevrolet
25	59	Kyle Martel	Bill Martel Racing	Chevrolet
26	07	Todd Peck (i)	SS-Green Light Racing	Chevrolet
27	63	Norm Benning	Norm Benning Racing	Chevrolet
Qualified by owner's points
28	6	Sean Corr	Norm Benning Racing	Chevrolet
29	28	Ryan Ellis (i)	FDNY Racing	Chevrolet
30	50	Travis Kvapil	MAKE Motorsports	Chevrolet
31	1	Jennifer Jo Cobb	Jennifer Jo Cobb Racing	Chevrolet
32	10	Caleb Roark	Jennifer Jo Cobb Racing	Chevrolet
Official starting lineup

== Race results ==
Fin	St	#	Driver	Team	Make	Laps	Led	Status	Pts
1	1	9	William Byron (R)	Kyle Busch Motorsports	Toyota	60	44	Running	37
2	10	13	Cameron Hayley	ThorSport Racing	Toyota	60	0	Running	31
3	15	11	Brett Moffitt	Red Horse Racing	Toyota	60	0	Running	30
4	7	17	Timothy Peters	Red Horse Racing	Toyota	60	4	Running	30
5	16	00	Cole Custer (R)	JR Motorsports	Chevrolet	60	0	Running	28
6	17	98	Rico Abreu (R)	ThorSport Racing	Toyota	60	0	Running	27
7	9	33	Ben Kennedy	GMS Racing	Chevrolet	60	0	Running	26
8	11	21	Johnny Sauter	GMS Racing	Chevrolet	60	0	Running	25
9	2	8	John Hunter Nemechek	NEMCO Motorsports	Chevrolet	60	0	Running	24
10	5	4	Christopher Bell (R)	Kyle Busch Motorsports	Toyota	60	0	Running	23
11	3	41	Ben Rhodes (R)	ThorSport Racing	Toyota	60	0	Running	22
12	20	88	Matt Crafton	ThorSport Racing	Toyota	60	0	Running	21
13	8	51	Cody Coughlin (R)	Kyle Busch Motorsports	Toyota	60	0	Running	20
14	18	66	Jordan Anderson	Bolen Motorsports	Chevrolet	60	0	Running	19
15	12	23	Spencer Gallagher	GMS Racing	Chevrolet	60	12	Running	19
16	30	50	Travis Kvapil	MAKE Motorsports	Chevrolet	60	0	Running	17
17	23	44	Tommy Joe Martins	Martins Motorsports	Chevrolet	60	0	Running	16
18	22	49	Reed Sorenson (i)	Premium Motorsports	Chevrolet	60	0	Running	0
19	25	59	Kyle Martel	Bill Martel Racing	Chevrolet	60	0	Running	14
20	29	28	Ryan Ellis (i)	FDNY Racing	Chevrolet	60	0	Running	0
21	26	07	Todd Peck (i)	SS-Green Light Racing	Chevrolet	60	0	Running	0
22	14	19	Daniel Hemric	Brad Keselowski Racing	Ford	60	0	Running	11
23	27	63	Norm Benning	Norm Benning Racing	Chevrolet	60	0	Running	10
24	19	86	Brandon Brown	Brandonbilt Motorsports	Chevrolet	59	0	Running	9
25	21	22	Austin Wayne Self (R)	AM Racing	Toyota	56	0	Running	8
26	4	29	Tyler Reddick	Brad Keselowski Racing	Ford	28	0	Accident	7
27	24	71	Carlos Contreras	Contreras Motorsports	Chevrolet	22	0	Electrical	6
28	31	1	Jennifer Jo Cobb	Jennifer Jo Cobb Racing	Chevrolet	20	0	Brakes	5
29	13	05	John Wes Townley	Athenian Motorsports	Chevrolet	16	0	Accident	4
30	28	6	Sean Corr	Norm Benning Racing	Chevrolet	5	0	Brakes	3
31	6	02	Austin Hill	Austin Hill Racing	Ford	1	0	Accident	2
32	32	10	Caleb Roark	Jennifer Jo Cobb Racing	Chevrolet	0	0	Engine	1
Official race results

== Standings after the race ==
Drivers' Championship standings

	Pos	Driver	Points
	1	William Byron	319
	2	Matt Crafton	294 (−25)
	3	Daniel Hemric	282 (−37)
1	4	Timothy Peters	282 (−37)
1	5	Johnny Sauter	278 (−41)
	6	Christopher Bell	268 (−51)
1	7	John Hunter Nemechek	256 (−63)
2	8	Cameron Hayley	251 (−68)
Official driver's standings

- Note: Only the first 8 positions are included for the driver standings.

Previous race: 2016 Aspen Dental Eldora Dirt Derby	NASCAR Camping World Truck Series; 2016 season	Next race: 2016 UNOH 200
