= 2016 Buckle Up in Your Truck 225 =

10th race of the 2016 NASCAR Camping World Truck Series

Race details
- Race 10 of 23 of the 2016 NASCAR Camping World Truck Series
- Date: July 7, 2016
- Official name: 6th Annual Buckle Up in Your Truck 225
- Location: Kentucky Speedway, Sparta, Kentucky
- Course: Permanent racing facility
- Course length: 1.5 miles (2.4 km)
- Distance: 150 laps, 225 mi (362 km)
- Scheduled distance: 150 laps, 225 mi (362 km)
- Average speed: 116.698 mph (187.807 km/h)

Pole position
Driver	Daniel Suárez	Kyle Busch Motorsports
- Time: 29.511

Most laps led
Driver	William Byron	Kyle Busch Motorsports
- Laps: 70

Winner
No. 9	William Byron	Kyle Busch Motorsports

Television in the United States
- Network: FS1
- Announcers: Vince Welch, Phil Parsons, and Michael Waltrip

Radio in the United States
- Radio: MRN

The 2016 Buckle Up in Your Truck 255 was the 10th stock car race of the 2016 NASCAR Camping World Truck Series, and the 6th iteration of the event. The race was held on Thursday, July 7, 2016, in Sparta, Kentucky, at Kentucky Speedway, a 1.5-mile (2.4 km) permanent tri-oval shaped racetrack. The race took the scheduled 150 laps to complete. William Byron, driving for Kyle Busch Motorsports, held off John Hunter Nemechek and Daniel Hemric in the final 20 laps, and earned his fourth career NASCAR Camping World Truck Series win. This was also the 51st win for Kyle Busch Motorsports, making them the most winningest team in the Truck Series.

== Background ==
The layout of Kentucky Speedway, the venue where the race was held.

Kentucky Speedway is a 1.5-mile (2.4 km) tri-oval speedway in Sparta, Kentucky, which has hosted ARCA, NASCAR and Indy Racing League racing annually since it opened in 2000. The track is currently owned and operated by Speedway Motorsports, Inc. Before 2008 Jerry Carroll, along with four other investors, were the majority owners of Kentucky Speedway. Depending on layout and configuration the track facility has a grandstand capacity of 107,000.

=== Entry list ===
- (R) denotes rookie driver.
- (i) denotes driver who is ineligible for series driver points.

#	Driver	Team	Make	Sponsor
00	Cole Custer (R)	JR Motorsports	Chevrolet	Haas Automation
1	Caleb Roark (Note: Travis Kvapil crashed his MAKE Motorsports No. 50 truck during practice. Since the team didn't have a backup truck, Jennifer Jo Cobb allowed Kvapil to use her No. 1 truck, and renumber it to No. 50. Jennifer used her backup truck and renumbered it to No. 10. Caleb Roark would drive the No. 1, which was a truck that was borrowed from Premium Motorsports to start and park.)	Jennifer Jo Cobb Racing	Chevrolet	Driven2Honor.org
02	Austin Hill	Austin Hill Racing	Ford	Austin Hill Racing
4	Christopher Bell (R)	Kyle Busch Motorsports	Toyota	JBL
05	Parker Kligerman	Athenian Motorsports	Chevrolet	Jive Communications, Zaxby's
07	Garrett Smithley (i)	SS-Green Light Racing	Chevrolet	Mubea
8	John Hunter Nemechek	NEMCO Motorsports	Chevrolet	NEMCO Motorsports
9	William Byron (R)	Kyle Busch Motorsports	Toyota	Liberty University
10	Jennifer Jo Cobb	Jennifer Jo Cobb Racing	Chevrolet	Driven2Honor.org
11	Brett Moffitt	Red Horse Racing	Toyota	Surface Sunscreen
13	Cameron Hayley	ThorSport Racing	Toyota	Cabinets by Hayley, Carolina Nut Co.
17	Timothy Peters	Red Horse Racing	Toyota	Red Horse Racing
18	Kyle Busch (i)	Kyle Busch Motorsports	Toyota	Toyota
19	Daniel Hemric	Brad Keselowski Racing	Ford	Oakmont Management Group
21	Johnny Sauter	GMS Racing	Chevrolet	Water Pulse
22	Austin Wayne Self (R)	AM Racing	Toyota	AM Technical Solutions
23	Spencer Gallagher	GMS Racing	Chevrolet	Allegiant Air
24	Grant Enfinger (R)	GMS Racing	Chevrolet	Champion Power Equipment
29	Tyler Reddick	Brad Keselowski Racing	Ford	Cooper-Standard Automotive
33	Ben Kennedy	GMS Racing	Chevrolet	Jacob Companies
41	Ben Rhodes (R)	ThorSport Racing	Toyota	Alpha Energy Solutions
44	Tommy Joe Martins	Martins Motorsports	Chevrolet	Diamond Gusset Jeans
49	Timmy Hill	Premium Motorsports	Chevrolet	Speed Stick
50	Travis Kvapil	MAKE Motorsports	Chevrolet	CorvetteParts.net
51	Daniel Suárez (i)	Kyle Busch Motorsports	Toyota	Arris
63	Norm Benning	Norm Benning Racing	Chevrolet	Mittler Bros. Machine & Tool, Ski Soda
66	Jordan Anderson	Bolen Motorsports	Chevrolet	Bolen Motorsports
71	Brandon Jones (i)	Ranier Racing with MDM	Chevrolet	Jeld-Wen, Menards
74	Mike Harmon (i)	Mike Harmon Racing	Chevrolet	SMD
86	Brandon Brown	Brandonbilt Motorsports	Chevrolet	Coastal Carolina University
88	Matt Crafton	ThorSport Racing	Toyota	Great Lakes Flooring, Menards
98	Rico Abreu (R)	ThorSport Racing	Toyota	Safelite, Curb Records
Official entry list

== Practice ==
=== First practice ===
The first practice session was originally going to be held on Wednesday, July 6, at 1:00 pm EST, and last for 1 hour and 55 minutes. The session was delayed for 2 hours due to inclement weather, and because of this, only two practice sessions would be held. Parker Kligerman, driving for Athenian Motorsports as a relief driver, would set the fastest time in the session, with a lap of 30.151, and an average speed of 179.099 mph (288.232 km/h).

Pos.	#	Driver	Team	Make	Time	Speed
1	05	Parker Kligerman	Athenian Motorsports	Chevrolet	30.151	179.099
2	9	William Byron (R)	Kyle Busch Motorsports	Toyota	30.155	179.075
3	18	Kyle Busch (i)	Kyle Busch Motorsports	Toyota	30.229	178.636
Full first practice results

=== Final practice ===
The final practice session was held on Wednesday, July 6, at 6:00 pm EST, and would last for about 3 hours. Brett Moffitt, driving for Red Horse Racing as a relief driver, would set the fastest time in the session, with a lap of 29.379, and an average speed of 183.805 mph (295.805 km/h).

Pos.	#	Driver	Team	Make	Time	Speed
1	11	Brett Moffitt	Red Horse Racing	Toyota	29.379	183.805
2	9	William Byron (R)	Kyle Busch Motorsports	Toyota	29.387	183.755
3	18	Kyle Busch (i)	Kyle Busch Motorsports	Toyota	29.446	183.387
Full final practice results

== Qualifying ==
Qualifying was held on Thursday, July 7, at 5:00 pm EST. Since Kentucky Speedway is at least 1.5 miles (2.4 km) in length, the qualifying system was a single car, single lap, two round system where in the first round, everyone would set a time to determine positions 13–32. Then, the fastest 12 qualifiers would move on to the second round to determine positions 1–12.

Daniel Suárez, driving for Kyle Busch Motorsports, would score the pole for the race, with a lap of 29.511, and an average speed of 182.983 mph (294.483 km/h) in the second round.

Mike Harmon would fail to qualify.

=== Full qualifying results ===
Pos.	#	Driver	Team	Make	Time (R1)	Speed (R1)	Time (R2)	Speed (R2)
1	51	Daniel Suárez (i)	Kyle Busch Motorsports	Toyota	29.703	181.800	29.511	182.983
2	11	Brett Moffitt	Red Horse Racing	Toyota	29.578	182.568	29.535	182.834
3	9	William Byron (R)	Kyle Busch Motorsports	Toyota	29.505	183.020	29.590	182.494
4	19	Daniel Hemric	Brad Keselowski Racing	Ford	29.724	181.671	29.598	182.445
5	29	Tyler Reddick	Brad Keselowski Racing	Ford	29.754	181.488	29.627	182.266
6	05	Parker Kligerman	Athenian Motorsports	Chevrolet	29.678	181.953	29.628	182.260
7	18	Kyle Busch (i)	Kyle Busch Motorsports	Toyota	29.739	181.580	29.629	182.254
8	88	Matt Crafton	ThorSport Racing	Toyota	29.755	181.482	29.637	182.205
9	41	Ben Rhodes (R)	ThorSport Racing	Toyota	29.856	180.868	29.855	180.874
10	4	Christopher Bell (R)	Kyle Busch Motorsports	Toyota	29.883	180.705	29.897	180.620
11	13	Cameron Hayley	ThorSport Racing	Toyota	29.868	180.796	29.927	180.439
12	00	Cole Custer (R)	JR Motorsports	Chevrolet	29.841	180.959	30.031	179.814
Eliminated in Round 1
13	23	Spencer Gallagher	GMS Racing	Chevrolet	29.917	180.499	–	–
14	17	Timothy Peters	Red Horse Racing	Toyota	29.935	180.391	–	–
15	21	Johnny Sauter	GMS Racing	Chevrolet	29.963	180.222	–	–
16	8	John Hunter Nemechek	NEMCO Motorsports	Chevrolet	29.995	180.030	–	–
17	24	Grant Enfinger (R)	GMS Racing	Chevrolet	30.003	179.982	–	–
18	33	Ben Kennedy	GMS Racing	Chevrolet	30.057	179.659	–	–
19	02	Austin Hill	Austin Hill Racing	Ford	30.109	179.348	–	–
20	66	Jordan Anderson	Bolen Motorsports	Chevrolet	30.211	178.743	–	–
21	98	Rico Abreu (R)	ThorSport Racing	Toyota	30.217	178.707	–	–
22	71	Brandon Jones (i)	Ranier Racing with MDM	Chevrolet	30.312	178.147	–	–
23	22	Austin Wayne Self (R)	AM Racing	Toyota	30.529	176.881	–	–
24	44	Tommy Joe Martins	Martins Motorsports	Chevrolet	30.625	176.327	–	–
25	86	Brandon Brown	Brandonbilt Motorsports	Chevrolet	30.666	176.091	–	–
26	07	Garrett Smithley (i)	SS-Green Light Racing	Chevrolet	30.949	174.481	–	–
27	49	Timmy Hill	Premium Motorsports	Chevrolet	31.340	172.304	–	–
Qualified by owner's points
28	50	Travis Kvapil	MAKE Motorsports	Chevrolet	31.406	171.942	–	–
29	74	Mike Harmon (i)	Mike Harmon Racing	Chevrolet	32.826	164.504	–	–
30	10	Jennifer Jo Cobb	Jennifer Jo Cobb Racing	Chevrolet	32.858	164.344	–	–
31	63	Norm Benning	Norm Benning Racing	Chevrolet	32.873	164.269	–	–
32	1	Caleb Roark	Jennifer Jo Cobb Racing	Chevrolet	–	–	–	–
Official qualifying results
Official starting lineup

== Race results ==
Fin	St	#	Driver	Team	Make	Laps	Led	Status	Pts
1	3	9	William Byron (R)	Kyle Busch Motorsports	Toyota	150	70	Running	37
2	16	8	John Hunter Nemechek	NEMCO Motorsports	Chevrolet	150	0	Running	31
3	4	19	Daniel Hemric	Brad Keselowski Racing	Ford	150	0	Running	30
4	10	4	Christopher Bell (R)	Kyle Busch Motorsports	Toyota	150	0	Running	29
5	15	21	Johnny Sauter	GMS Racing	Chevrolet	150	14	Running	29
6	11	13	Cameron Hayley	ThorSport Racing	Toyota	150	0	Running	27
7	22	71	Brandon Jones (i)	Ranier Racing with MDM	Chevrolet	150	0	Running	0
8	8	88	Matt Crafton	ThorSport Racing	Toyota	150	0	Running	25
9	14	17	Timothy Peters	Red Horse Racing	Toyota	150	5	Running	25
10	5	29	Tyler Reddick	Brad Keselowski Racing	Ford	150	1	Running	24
11	1	51	Daniel Suárez (i)	Kyle Busch Motorsports	Toyota	150	59	Running	0
12	17	24	Grant Enfinger (R)	GMS Racing	Chevrolet	150	0	Running	21
13	9	41	Ben Rhodes (R)	ThorSport Racing	Toyota	150	0	Running	20
14	12	00	Cole Custer (R)	JR Motorsports	Chevrolet	150	0	Running	19
15	21	98	Rico Abreu (R)	ThorSport Racing	Toyota	150	0	Running	18
16	13	23	Spencer Gallagher	GMS Racing	Chevrolet	150	0	Running	17
17	20	66	Jordan Anderson	Bolen Motorsports	Chevrolet	150	0	Running	16
18	19	02	Austin Hill	Austin Hill Racing	Ford	150	0	Running	15
19	6	05	Parker Kligerman	Athenian Motorsports	Chevrolet	149	0	Running	14
20	25	86	Brandon Brown	Brandonbilt Motorsports	Chevrolet	149	0	Running	13
21	26	07	Garrett Smithley (i)	SS-Green Light Racing	Chevrolet	148	0	Running	12
22	18	33	Ben Kennedy	GMS Racing	Chevrolet	147	0	Running	11
23	27	49	Timmy Hill	Premium Motorsports	Chevrolet	145	0	Running	10
24	29	10	Jennifer Jo Cobb	Jennifer Jo Cobb Racing	Chevrolet	143	0	Running	9
25	28	50	Travis Kvapil	MAKE Motorsports	Chevrolet	136	0	Running	8
26	24	44	Tommy Joe Martins	Martins Motorsports	Chevrolet	107	1	Overheating	7
27	23	22	Austin Wayne Self (R)	AM Racing	Toyota	98	0	Transmission	6
28	30	63	Norm Benning	Norm Benning Racing	Chevrolet	95	0	Vibration	5
29	32	74	Mike Harmon (i)	Mike Harmon Racing	Chevrolet	62	0	Vibration	0
30	7	18	Kyle Busch (i)	Kyle Busch Motorsports	Toyota	56	0	Accident	3
31	2	11	Brett Moffitt	Red Horse Racing	Toyota	26	0	Engine	2
32	31	1	Caleb Roark	Jennifer Jo Cobb Racing	Chevrolet	0	0	Electrical	1
Official race results

== Standings after the race ==
Drivers' Championship standings

	Pos	Driver	Points
	1	William Byron	263
	2	Matt Crafton	250 (−13)
1	3	Daniel Hemric	246 (−17)
1	4	Timothy Peters	246 (−17)
	5	Johnny Sauter	233 (−30)
	6	John Hunter Nemechek	223 (−40)
1	7	Tyler Reddick	215 (−48)
1	8	Christopher Bell	214 (−49)
Official driver's standings

- Note: Only the first 8 positions are included for the driver standings.

Previous race: 2016 Drivin' for Linemen 200	NASCAR Camping World Truck Series; 2016 season	Next race: 2016 Aspen Dental Eldora Dirt Derby
