= Natalie Sather =

American racing driver

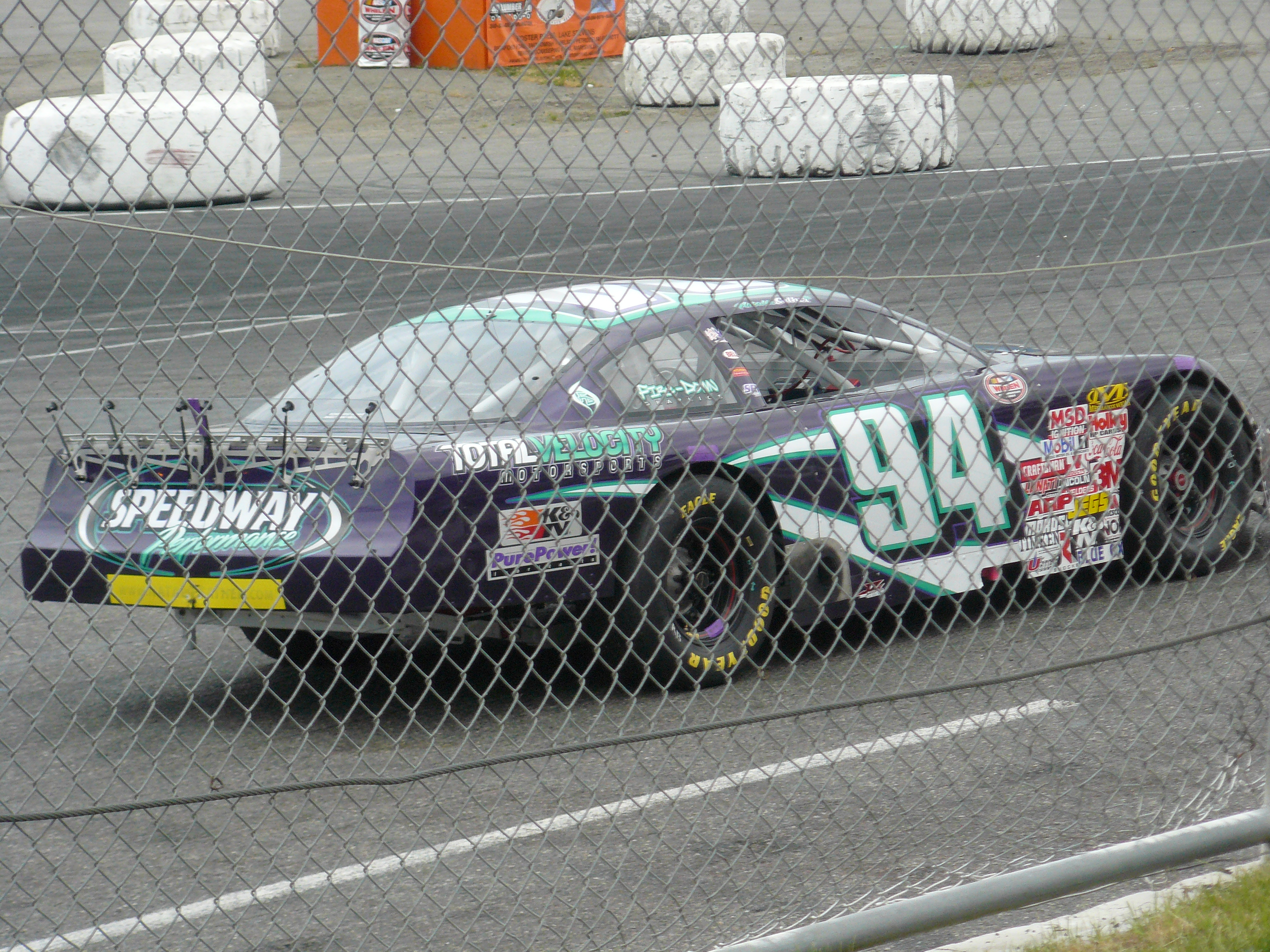
- Sather's No. 94 at Evergreen Speedway in 2009
- Nationality: American
- Born: March 12, 1985 (age 41) Fargo, North Dakota, U.S.

Championship titles
- 2007: American Sprint Car Series Midwest

Awards
- 2009 2008 2007: Evergreen Speedway Rookie of the Year; Knoxville Raceway Rookie of the Year; Knoxville Nationals (360 Sprint Car) Rookie of the Year

Natalie Sather (born March 12, 1985) is an American auto racing driver.

== Racing career ==
=== Early career ===
Sather was first interested in racing when she was in kindergarten, bringing die-cast cars into show-and-tell. When she was nine years old, Sather started racing after acquiring a go-kart. Upon winning a karting championship in 2001, she moved to sprint cars. When she was 17, in her fifth sprint car race, she was involved in a crash that created three compound fractures in her right leg, though she returned to racing four months later.

In 2007, Sather won the American Sprint Car Series Midwest Championship, the first female to win the title. She spent five seasons in the series, and won the ASCS Midwest championship.

Sather also made starts in the World of Outlaws, qualifying for a preliminary A-Main in 410 sprint cars at the 2007 Knoxville Nationals. The following year, she returned to Knoxville, and finished in the top-ten in the 360 Sprint Car points standings, along with winning Rookie of the Year.

To develop her racing, Sather attended the Skip Barber Racing School, Finish Line Racing School, Lyn St. James Women in Racing Program, and the Jimmy Sills Racing School.

=== NASCAR ===
In 2008, Sather was invited to NASCAR's Drive for Diversity Combine at South Boston Speedway, and was eventually named to the program's 2009 class. On April 11, 2009, Sather began racing asphalt super late models, finishing in the top-10, and competed full-time at Evergreen Speedway's 0.375 mi (0.604 km) and 0.6265 mi (1.0083 km) layouts; she finished fourth in the points standings, and was named rookie of the year. In 2010, she joined the Whelen All-American Series' Late Model division at South Boston, racing for Sellers Racing Inc., owned by Peyton Sellers and H.C. Sellers. In her first 17 races at the track, Sather recorded 13 top-fives and 15 top-10 finishes.

On March 29, 2012, Sather joined MAKE Motorsports to make her Camping World Truck Series debut. In her first attempt at Martinsville Speedway, Sather was 38th fastest with a lap time of 20.584 and speed of 91.994 miles per hour (148.050 km/h), and as a result, failed to qualify. She later attempted to qualify at Iowa Speedway, but crashed before she could make a complete lap in qualifying. In an interview, Sather said that this race was her "last chance" to make it into the sport, and that because of her second straight DNQ, her "future looked very bleak". She never competed in auto racing again after the weekend.

== Post-racing career ==
In 2014, Sather was hired by the National Sprint League as the series' Marketing Director.

== Personal life ==
The daughter of Brad and Tessa Sather, Sather is the eldest of three sisters, consisting of her, Whitney and Sidney. Her hobbies include shopping, dogs, hunting and fishing, and country music. In high school, Sather was captain of the cheerleading squad.

In 2003, Sather participated in the Miss North Dakota Teen USA pageant, being named Miss Congeniality. She returned to the pageant three years later, winning second runner-up.

In 2023, Sather married Paul Silva.

== Motorsports career results ==
=== NASCAR ===
(key) (Bold – Pole position awarded by qualifying time. Italics – Pole position earned by points standings or practice time. * – Most laps led.)

==== Camping World Truck Series ====
NASCAR Camping World Truck Series results
Year	Team	No.	Make	1	2	3	4	5	6	7	8	9	10	11	12	13	14	15	16	17	18	19	20	21	22	NCWTC	Pts	Ref
2012	MAKE Motorsports	50	Chevy	DAY	MAR; DNQ	CAR	KAN	CLT	DOV	TEX	KEN	IOW; DNQ	CHI	POC	MCH	BRI	ATL	IOW	KEN	LVS	TAL	MAR	TEX	PHO	HOM	NA	-	
