= Beaver Motorsports =

American stock car racing team

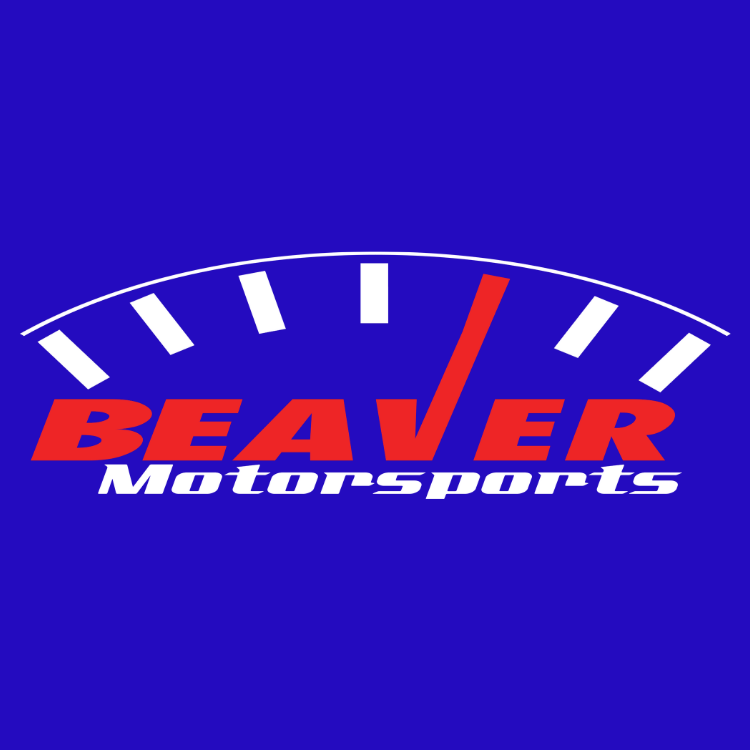
- Owner: Mark Beaver
- Base: Shelby, North Carolina
- Series: NHRA Pro Stock
- Manufacturer: Chevrolet
- Opened: 2010
- Closed: 2019 (NASCAR)

Career
- Debut: Nationwide Series: 2011 Great Clips 300 (Atlanta); Truck Series: 2010 North Carolina Education Lottery 200 (Charlotte)
- Latest race: Xfinity Series: 2013 5-hour Energy 200 (Dover); Truck Series: 2019 CarShield 200 (Gateway)
- Races competed: Total: 175; Xfinity Series: 33; Truck Series: 142
- Drivers' Championships: Total: 0 Xfinity Series: 0 Truck Series: 0
- Race victories: Total: 0 Xfinity Series: 0 Truck Series: 0
- Pole positions: Total: 0 Xfinity Series: 0 Truck Series: 0

Beaver Motorsports (formerly MAKE Motorsports) is an American drag racing team. The team currently fields a Chevrolet Pro Stock entry in the NHRA. Beaver Motorsports formerly competed in the NASCAR Xfinity Series and NASCAR Gander Outdoors Truck Series.

== Nationwide Series ==
=== Car No. 50 history ===
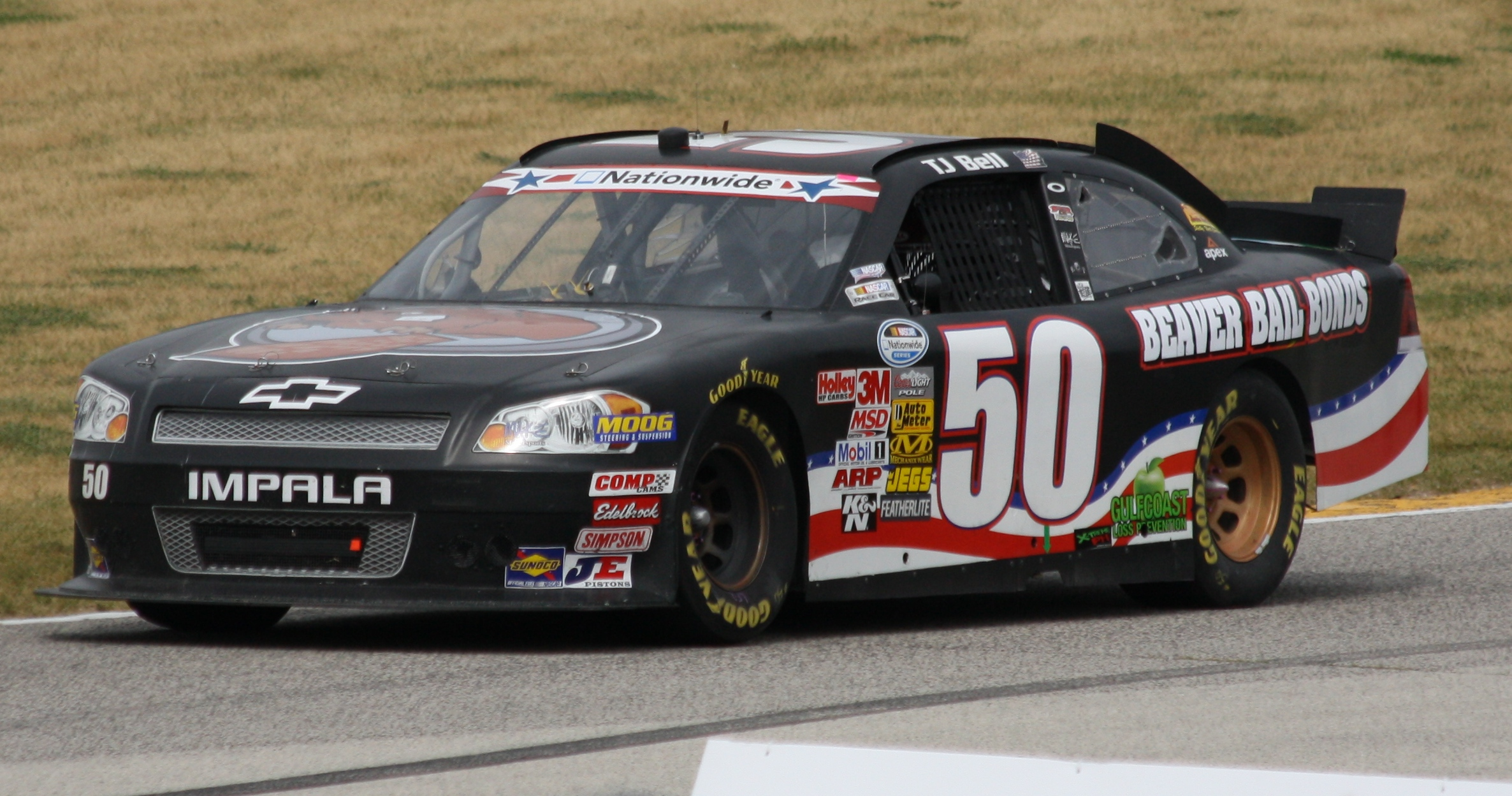
T. J. Bell at Road America in 2012

The team started off in the Nationwide Series with T. J. Bell, who had run races for the team in the Camping World Truck Series. He ran six races in the team's first season in Xfinity, 2011, start and parking for four of them, and failing to qualify for three others. He recorded a best finish of 23rd at Charlotte Motor Speedway.

In 2012, the team went the distance in races during the first part of the season, but with three wrecks and two mechanical problems in the first nine races of the season, the team resorted to start and parking after the Kentucky Speedway race. After the race at Iowa Speedway, Bell left the team and was replaced by David Starr, who did not finish a race in his three races for the team and failed to qualify for another. After running the Dover International Speedway race with The Motorsports Group, Bell returned to the team, failing to qualify for the Charlotte race and completing only one lap at Texas Motor Speedway before retiring in last place with engine problems. He recorded a best finish of 24th, which occurred in the season-opening DRIVE4COPD 300 at Daytona International Speedway and the 5-Hour Energy 200 at Dover in spring.

Danny Efland then took over for 2013 after starting and parking for MAKE in the Camping World Truck Series. He followed suit in the Nationwide Series, doing so for all three of his races and failing to qualify for five others. He posted a best finish of 34th at Iowa Speedway.

=== Car No. 50 results ===
Year	Driver	No.	Make	1	2	3	4	5	6	7	8	9	10	11	12	13	14	15	16	17	18	19	20	21	22	23	24	25	26	27	28	29	30	31	32	33	34	Owners	Pts
2011	T. J. Bell	50	Chevy	DAY	PHO	LVS	BRI	CAL	TEX	TAL	NSH	RCH	DAR	DOV	IOW	CLT	CHI	MCH	ROA	DAY	KEN	NHA	NSH	IRP	IOW	GLN	CGV	BRI; DNQ	ATL; 27	RCH; DNQ	CHI; 43	DOV; 42	KAN; 42	CLT; 23	TEX; 41	PHO	HOM; DNQ	59th	46
2012	T. J. Bell	50	Chevy	DAY; 24	PHO; 29	LVS; 31	BRI; 34	CAL; 27	TEX; 26	RCH; 28	TAL; 31	DAR; 32	IOW; 27	CLT; 30	DOV; 24	MCH; 32	ROA; 37	KEN; 27	DAY; 39		CHI; 38	IND; 39	IOW; 36	GLN	CGV							CLT; DNQ	KAN	TEX; 43	PHO	HOM		36th	288
2012	T. J. Bell	50	Toyota																	NHA; 35																		36th	288
2012	David Starr	50	Chevy																							BRI; 39	ATL; 27	RCH; DNQ	CHI	KEN; 33	DOV; DNQ							36th	288
2013	Danny Efland	50	Chevy	DAY	PHO	LVS	BRI	CAL	TEX	RCH	TAL	DAR	CLT	DOV	IOW	MCH	ROA	KEN	DAY	NHA	CHI	IND	IOW; 34	GLN	MOH	BRI	ATL; 35	RCH; DNQ	CHI	KEN; DNQ	DOV; 39	KAN	CLT; DNQ	TEX	PHO	HOM		57th	24

== Camping World Truck Series ==
=== Truck No. 1 history ===
The team first fielded this truck in 2013 with Jonathan Davenport driving the entry at Martinsville Speedway, where he would fail to qualify.

Milka Duno would debut this truck in 2014, leading two laps and finishing 25th in the Fred's 250 at Talladega Superspeedway.

The team made the truck full-time for 2015, with multiple drivers in the seat. Donnie Neuenberger ran the season-opening NextEra Energy Resources 250, finishing 31st after being involved in a Lap 14 crash. Morgan Shepherd ran the next race, qualifying 30th and finishing 27th at Atlanta Motor Speedway. Travis Kvapil ran the next race, falling out with rear gear problems after 83 laps of the Kroger 250. Ryan Ellis took over command of the truck, finishing 20th at Kansas Speedway. Kyle Fowler then made his only Camping World Truck Series start of 2015, logging a 20th-place finish in the North Carolina Education Lottery 200 at Charlotte Motor Speedway. Ellis then drove the next four races in the truck, posting a best finish of 17th at Gateway Motorsports Park. Kvapil then returned from the No. 50 truck, driving the next four races and having a best finish of 14th at Kentucky Speedway. Ellis then returned to run the UNOH 200, finishing 28th. Kvapil ran the next five races for the team, with a 17th at New Hampshire Motor Speedway as his best effort in that timespan. The team then sold out its spot to Rick Ware Racing for the next race at Martinsville Speedway. Kvapil ran the next race, finishing 22nd at Texas Motor Speedway. The team then sold its spot to Ware for the penultimate race. Stacey ran the final race of the season, finishing 24th.

David Levine would attempt the 2016 season opener, but fail to qualify. Travis Kvapil and Ryan Ellis would drive in two races each. Following the 7th race of the season, the team would form a partnership with Jennifer Jo Cobb Racing that would see Jennifer Jo Cobb pilot the No. 1 truck under her own team's banner for much of the season, only fielding their own truck in the final race. All owner points would still go to the same truck.

Before the 2017 season, former co-owner Tracy Lowe took ownership of the No. 1 and formed her own team, TJL Motorsports, with it.

In 2019, the team returned with Travis Kvapil, Stefan Parsons and Cody McMahan, all of them drove one race each. Bayley Currey and B. J. McLeod also made a few starts for Vizion Motorsports using the No. 1 owner points, these were officially entered as Beaver Motorsports entries.

==== Truck No. 1 results ====
Year	Driver	No.	Make	1	2	3	4	5	6	7	8	9	10	11	12	13	14	15	16	17	18	19	20	21	22	23	NCWTC	Pts
2013	Jonathan Davenport	1	Chevy	DAY	MAR; DNQ																						67th	0
2013	T. J. Bell	1	Chevy			CAR; DNQ	KAN	CLT	DOV	TEX	KEN	IOW	ELD	POC	MCH	BRI	MSP	IOW	CHI	LVS	TAL	MAR	TEX	PHO	HOM		67th	0
2014	Milka Duno	1	Chevy	DAY	MAR	KAN	CLT	DOV	TEX	GTW	KEN	IOW	ELD	POC	MCH	BRI	MSP	CHI	NHA	LVS	TAL; 25	MAR	TEX	PHO	HOM		59th	20
2015	Donnie Neuenberger	1	Chevy	DAY; 31																							23rd	479
2015	Morgan Shepherd	1	Chevy		ATL; 27																						23rd	479
2015	Travis Kvapil	1	Chevy			MAR; 32							KEN; 14	ELD; 30	POC; 23	MCH; 18		MSP; 24	CHI; 24	NHA; 17	LVS; 18	TAL; 27	MAR	TEX; 26	PHO		23rd	479
2015	Ryan Ellis	1	Chevy				KAN; 20		DOV; 24	TEX; 20	GTW; 17	IOW; 29					BRI; 28										23rd	479
2015	Kyle Fowler	1	Chevy					CLT; 20																			23rd	479
2015	Dexter Stacey	1	Chevy																							HOM; 24	23rd	479
2016	David Levine	1	Chevy	DAY; DNQ																							31st	134
2016	Travis Kvapil	1	Chevy		ATL; 23	MAR																				HOM; 27	31st	134
2016	Ryan Ellis	1	Chevy				KAN; 30	DOV	CLT	TEX; 30	IOW	GTW	KEN	ELD	POC	BRI	MCH	MSP	CHI	NHA	LVS	TAL	MAR	TEX	PHO		31st	134
2019	Travis Kvapil	1	Chevy	DAY; Wth	ATL; Wth		MAR; 28		DOV; Wth																		49th	38
2019	Stefan Parsons	1	Chevy			LVS; 31																					49th	38
2019	Bayley Currey	1	Toyota					TEX; Wth		KAN; 29	CLT; Wth	TEX	IOW														49th	38
2019	Cody McMahan	1	Chevy											GTW; 29													49th	38
2019	B. J. McLeod	1	Toyota												CHI; 30	KEN	POC	ELD	MCH	BRI	MSP	LVS	TAL	MAR	PHO	HOM	49th	38

=== Truck No. 14 history ===
In 2016, the No. 14 Chevy was run by Natalie Decker at Martinsville (Spring) and failed to qualify into the race.

==== Truck No. 14 results ====
Year	Driver	No.	Make	1	2	3	4	5	6	7	8	9	10	11	12	13	14	15	16	17	18	19	20	21	22	23	NCWTC	Pts
2016	Natalie Decker	14	Chevy	DAY	ATL	MAR; DNQ	KAN	DOV	CLT	TEX	IOW	GTW	KEN	ELD	POC	BRI	MCH	MSP	CHI	NHA	LVS	TAL	MAR	TEX	PHO	HOM	50th	0

=== Truck No. 50 history ===
The team debuted in the Camping World Truck Series at the 2010 Nashville 200 with G. R. Smith at the wheel. In his only start with the team, Smith qualified 32nd and finished last in the 36 truck field, retiring with engine troubles. T. J. Bell then joined the team to race part-time, with sponsorship from Liberty Tire Recycling, which was also the team's tire recycler. In his first race, he finished 27th at Charlotte Motor Speedway, retiring 14 laps from the end with engine problems. In his next race, at Darlington Raceway, Bell crashed out after 73 laps. In the final race of the season for the team, Bell finally finished a race, 19th at Texas Motor Speedway.

In 2011, the team ran Bell in three more races, crashing at Daytona International Speedway and Charlotte Motor Speedway, finishing in only the Darlington race. He finished 22nd, a lap down.

The team would only attempt two Truck races in 2012, both with Natalie Sather, but she failed to qualify both times. Instead, they focused on their efforts with Bell in the Xfinity Series.

In 2013, the team started with Danny Efland at Charlotte, the only race he finished that season. After a 20th there, he start and parked for three races.

Travis Kvapil drove the first two races for the team in 2014, posting finishes of 22nd at Daytona and 23rd at Martinsville Speedway. T. J. Bell then returned to the team, running the distance at the start but then starting and parking near the end of the season. He tallied a best finish of 15th at Dover International Speedway in his 17 starts with the team. Jordan Anderson then ran the penultimate race at Phoenix International Raceway, finishing 24th. Wendell Chavous then ran the finale at Homestead-Miami Speedway, finishing 31st after falling out with electrical problems.

Heading into the 2015 season, Cody Ware was set to run the entire season with the team. However, after he failed to qualify for the season-opening NextEra Energy Resources 250, crashing in the next race and retiring with a vibration in the third race, Ware stopped racing the truck. Travis Kvapil then transitioned over from the No. 1 truck, running the next three events, retiring with rear gear problems at Kansas Speedway, crashing out at Charlotte Motor Speedway, and finishing 19th at Dover International Speedway. Donnie Neuenberger then made his next start for the team since driving the No. 1 at Daytona earlier that year. However, engine problems hampered his efforts in the WinStar World Casino 400, forcing him to retire after eight laps. Kvapil then returned to the truck, posting finishing 14th at Gateway Motorsports Park and 24th at Iowa Speedway. Ryan Ellis then came over from the No. 1 truck for the race at Kentucky Speedway, finishing 30th after dealing with electrical problems. The team then sold out its owner points to Jody Knowles for the Eldora Speedway race. The team sold out its spot for the next race, to Kyle Martel. Tyler Tanner then ran the next race for the team, starting and parking at Michigan International Speedway. Kvapil then returned for the next race at Bristol Motor Speedway, finishing 19th. Ellis then ran the next two races, starting and parking. Tanner continued doing the same for the next two races. Ellis then failed to qualify the truck at Talladega Superspeedway. Kvapil then piloted the truck in the next race, finishing 15th at Martinsville Speedway. Dexter Stacey then ran the No. 50 for the next race, finishing 29th at Texas Motor Speedway after starting and parking. Kvapil then returned to the truck for the final two races, finishing 15th at Phoenix International Raceway and 22nd at Homestead–Miami Speedway.

Kvapil continued his relationship with the team in 2016, driving the No. 50 close to full-time, just switching to the No. 1 entry in the season finale so that Spencer Boyd could take the No. 50.

In 2017, the team was renamed to Beaver Motorsports and continued to field the No. 50 full-time. In the six first races of the season the team made a partnership with Rick Ware Racing with Cody Ware and Spencer Boyd, both RWR drivers at that time sharing the ride. Starting in the seventh race the partnership ended and Josh Reaume drove almost every race, with an exception of Pocono that the team withdrew, Eldora and Mosport Park, where Beaver made a partnership with Mike Harmon Racing, Harmon himself drove at Eldora and Bobby Reuse, MWR driver at that time drove at Mosport Park and Martinsville (fall) where Bayley Currey made his NASCAR debut.

==== Truck No. 50 results ====
Year	Driver	No.	Make	1	2	3	4	5	6	7	8	9	10	11	12	13	14	15	16	17	18	19	20	21	22	23	24	25	NCWTC	Pts
2010	G. R. Smith	50	Dodge	DAY	ATL	MAR	NSH; 36	KAN; DNQ	DOV																				47th	374
2010	T. J. Bell	50	Chevy							CLT; 27	TEX	MCH	IOW	GTY	IRP	POC	NSH	DAR; 26	BRI	CHI	KEN	NHA	LVS	MAR	TAL	TEX; 19	PHO	HOM	47th	374
2011	T. J. Bell	50	Chevy	DAY; 31	PHO	DAR; 22	MAR	NSH	DOV	CLT; 31	KAN	TEX	KEN	IOW	NSH	IRP	POC	MCH	BRI	ATL	CHI	NHA	KEN	LVS	TAL	MAR	TEX	HOM	50th	48
2012	Natalie Sather	50	Chevy	DAY	MAR; DNQ	CAR	KAN	CLT	DOV	TEX	KEN	IOW; DNQ	CHI	POC	MCH	BRI	ATL	IOW	KEN	LVS	TAL	MAR	TEX	PHO	HOM				70th	0
2013	Rick Crawford	50	Chevy	DAY; DNQ	MAR	CAR	KAN																						45th	60
2013	Danny Efland	50	Chevy					CLT; 20	DOV; 33	TEX	KEN	IOW	ELD	POC	MCH; 33	BRI	MSP	IOW	CHI; 33	LVS	TAL; DNQ	MAR	TEX	PHO					45th	60
2013	Bradley Riethmeyer	50	Chevy																						HOM; DNQ				45th	60
2014	Travis Kvapil	50	Chevy	DAY; 22	MAR; 23																								23rd	447
2014	T. J. Bell	50	Chevy			KAN; 17	CLT; 18	DOV; 15	TEX; 18	GTW; 19	KEN; 25	IOW; 24	ELD; 21	POC; 29	MCH; 25	BRI; 28	MSP; 21	CHI; 26	NHA; 25	LVS; 25		MAR; 36	TEX; 25						23rd	447
2014	Derek White	50	Chevy																		TAL; 26								23rd	447
2014	Jordan Anderson	50	Chevy																					PHO; 24					23rd	447
2014	Wendell Chavous	50	Chevy																						HOM; 31				23rd	447
2015	Cody Ware	50	Chevy	DAY; DNQ	ATL; 30	MAR; 27																							26th	412
2015	Travis Kvapil	50	Chevy				KAN; 25	CLT; 28	DOV; 19		GTW; 14	IOW; 24					BRI; 19						MAR; 15		PHO; 15	HOM; 22			26th	412
2015	Donnie Neuenberger	50	Chevy							TEX; 28																			26th	412
2015	Ryan Ellis	50	Chevy										KEN; 30	ELD	POC			MSP; 31	CHI; 29			TAL; DNQ							26th	412
2015	Tyler Tanner	50	Chevy													MCH; 29				NHA; 30	LVS; 32								26th	412
2015	Dexter Stacey	50	Chevy																					TEX; 29					26th	412
2016	Travis Kvapil	50	Chevy	DAY; 5		MAR; DNQ	KAN; 20	DOV; 23	CLT; 30	TEX; 24	IOW; 27	GTW; 12	KEN; 25	ELD; 17	POC; 16	BRI; 25	MCH; 18	MSP; 25	CHI; 21	NHA; 18	LVS; 24	TAL; 13	MAR; 27	TEX; 27	PHO; 23				26th	244
2016	Ryan Ellis	50	Chevy		ATL; DNQ																								26th	244
2016	Spencer Boyd	50	Chevy																							HOM; 30			26th	244
2017	Travis Kvapil	50	Chevy	DAY; 24		MAR; 29																							21st	353
2017	Akinori Ogata	50	Chevy		ATL; 30																								21st	353
2017	Cody Ware	50	Chevy				KAN; 22		DOV; 18																				21st	353
2017	Spencer Boyd	50	Chevy					CLT; 20																					21st	353
2017	Josh Reaume	50	Chevy							TEX; 26	GTW; 19	IOW; 18	KEN; 20		POC; Wth	MCH; 19	BRI; 25		CHI; 19	NHA; 17	LVS; 16	TAL; 21		TEX; 20	PHO; 16	HOM; 22			21st	353
2017	Mike Harmon	50	Chevy											ELD; 18															21st	353
2017	Bobby Reuse	50	Chevy															MSP; 17											21st	353
2017	Bayley Currey	50	Chevy																				MAR; 25						21st	353
2018	Travis Kvapil	50	Chevy	DAY; 32	ATL; DNQ																LVS; Wth	TAL	MAR	TEX	PHO				33rd	127
2018	B. J. McLeod	50	Chevy			LVS; 23																							33rd	127
2018	Dawson Cram	50	Chevy				MAR; 17																						33rd	127
2018	Todd Peck	50	Chevy					DOV; 32			TEX; 32																		33rd	127
2018	Jamie Mosley	50	Chevy						KAN; 28																				33rd	127
2018	Timmy Hill	50	Chevy							CLT; 28																			33rd	127
2018	Ross Chastain	50	Chevy									IOW; 30	GTW; 29																33rd	127
2018	Brian Kaltreider	50	Chevy											CHI; 25	KEN														33rd	127
2018	Mike Harmon	50	Chevy													ELD; DNQ													33rd	127
2018	Ray Ciccarelli	50	Chevy														POC; 27			MSP; 28									33rd	127
2018	Reed Sorenson	50	Chevy															MCH; 28											33rd	127
2018	Gray Gaulding	50	Chevy																BRI; DNQ										33rd	127
2018	Camden Murphy	50	Chevy																							HOM; 32			33rd	127

=== Truck No. 55 history ===
Jake Crum ran this number for one race in 2011, crashing out at Texas Motor Speedway.

==== Truck No. 55 results ====
Year	Driver	No.	Make	1	2	3	4	5	6	7	8	9	10	11	12	13	14	15	16	17	18	19	20	21	22	23	24	25	NCWTC	Pts
2011	Jake Crum	55	Chevy	DAY	PHO	DAR	MAR	NSH	DOV	CLT	KAN	TEX	KEN	IOW	NSH	IRP	POC	MCH	BRI	ATL	CHI	NHA	KEN	LVS	TAL	MAR	TEX; 25	HOM	63rd	19

== Drag racing ==
In 2020, the team began a NHRA Pro Stock effort, fielding entries for multiple drivers throughout the course of the season.
