= Brady Boswell =

American racecar driver

- Born: April 18, 1997 (age 29) Watkinsville, Georgia, U.S.

ARCA Menards Series career
- Debut season: 2016
- Former teams: Mason Mitchell Motorsports, Cunningham Motorsports
- Starts: 7
- Wins: 0
- Poles: 0
- Best finish: 24th in 2016
- Finished last season: 24th (2016)

NASCAR FedEx Freight Truck Series career
- 2 races run over 1 year
- 2016 position: 45th
- Best finish: 45th (2016)
- First race: 2016 Aspen Dental Eldora Dirt Derby (Eldora)
- Last race: 2016 Ford EcoBoost 200 (Homestead)
| Wins | Top tens | Poles |
|---|---|---|
| 0 | 0 | 0 |
- Statistics up to date as of January 4, 2020.

Brady Boswell (born April 18, 1997) is an American former professional stock car racing driver. He most recently competed part-time in the ARCA Menards Series and the NASCAR Gander RV & Outdoors Truck Series for Mason Mitchell Motorsports, Cunningham Motorsports, and Athenian Motorsports in 2016. Since then, he has been without a ride in any NASCAR series.

== Racing career ==
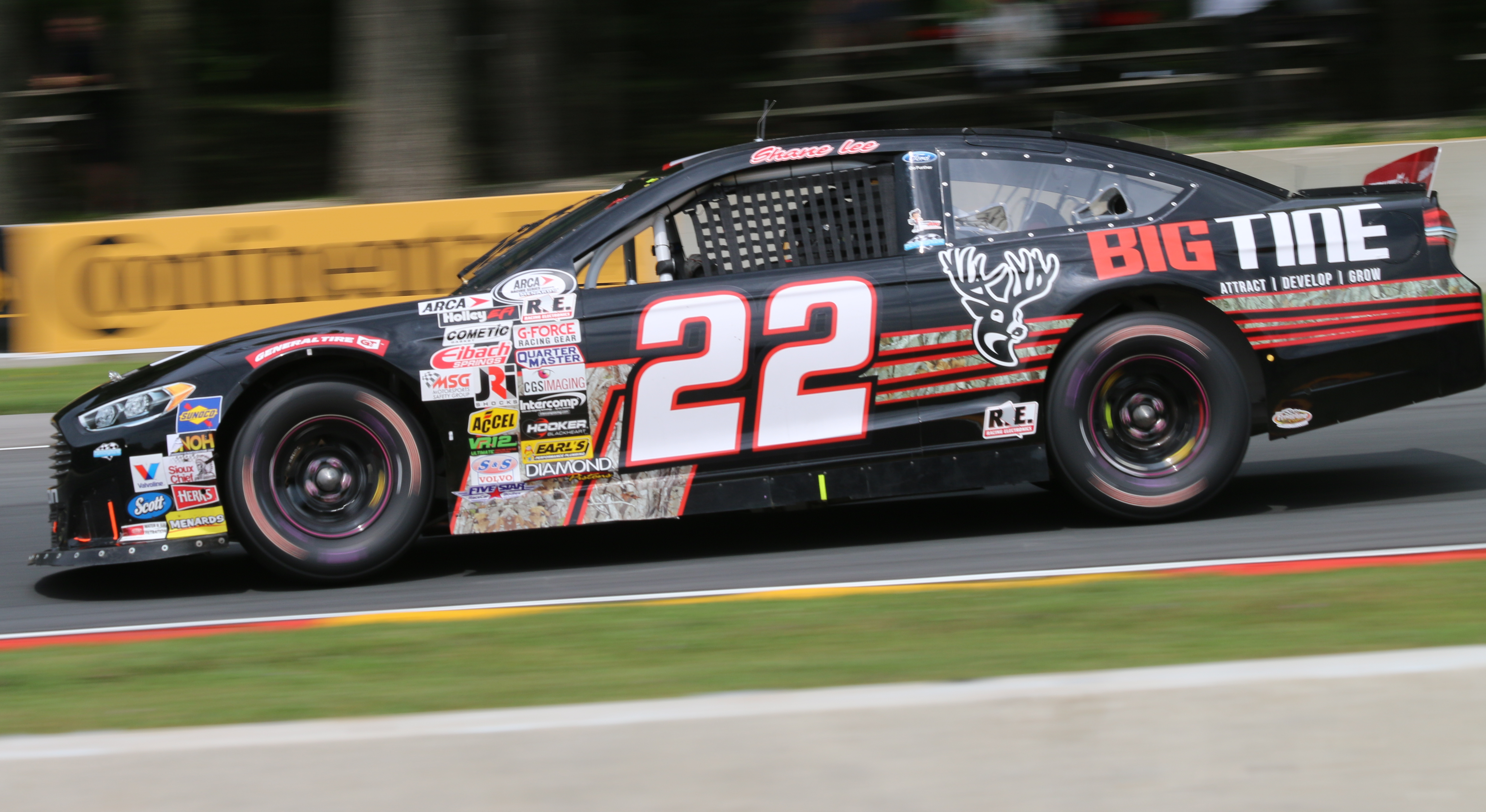
Boswell drove the No. 22 car for Cunningham Motorsports at Talladega in 2016.

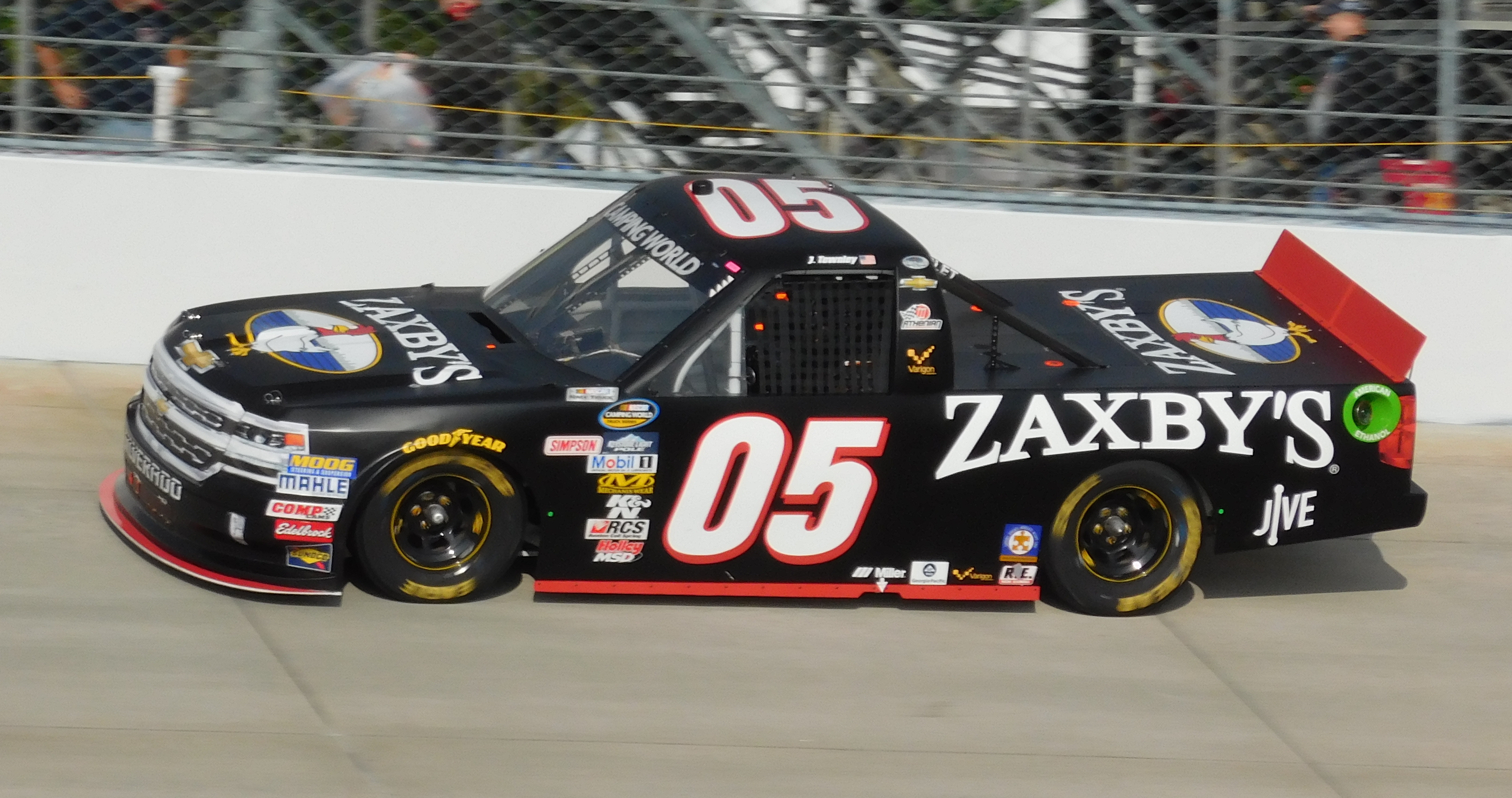
Boswell made two Truck Series starts in 2016 at Eldora and Homestead in the No. 05 as a sub for the injured John Wes Townley.

After making his ARCA debut at Nashville, Mason Mitchell Motorsports announced that Boswell would run an additional six races with the team in the No. 98 car, which were the first Pocono race, Michigan, Iowa, IRP, Kentucky, and Kansas. However, team owner Mason Mitchell ended up driving the car at Kansas instead. Also, he drove at Talladega in the No. 22 Dodge for Cunningham Motorsports, the car that won that race the previous year with Blake Jones driving. He would go on to earn a top-ten finish after qualifying ninth for the race.

When John Wes Townley got a concussion before the Truck Series race at Eldora, Boswell was selected to fill in for him that weekend in his Athenian Motorsports team's No. 05 Chevrolet. In his series debut, he started 16th and finished 21st. Boswell ran one more race for the team at Homestead that year, when Townley was injured again, this time to his ankle. He qualified in the top-ten (starting ninth) and finished 19th and on the lead lap at the end of the race. That race ended up being Athenian Motorsports' last race because they ended up shutting down over the offseason when Townley announced his retirement from racing.

== Personal life ==
Boswell is from Watkinsville, Georgia, which is the same town where John Wes Townley is from, which is the reason Townley picked him to fill in for him at the truck race at Eldora in 2016 when he was injured with a concussion.

Boswell decided not to race in 2015 and instead attend college full-time at the University of North Georgia.

In 2017, Boswell joined the Shade Foundation as an ambassador for their foundation, which raises awareness to children about skin cancer and sun safety.

Boswell is not related to current NASCAR crew chief and former driver Richard Boswell.

== Motorsports career results ==
=== NASCAR ===
(key) (Bold – Pole position awarded by qualifying time. Italics – Pole position earned by points standings or practice time. * – Most laps led.)

==== Camping World Truck Series ====
NASCAR Camping World Truck Series results
| Year | Team | No. | Make | 1 | 2 | 3 | 4 | 5 | 6 | 7 | 8 | 9 | 10 | 11 | 12 | 13 | 14 | 15 | 16 | 17 | 18 | 19 | 20 | 21 | 22 | 23 | NCWTC | Pts | Ref |
|---|---|---|---|---|---|---|---|---|---|---|---|---|---|---|---|---|---|---|---|---|---|---|---|---|---|---|---|---|---|
| 2016 | Athenian Motorsports | 05 | Chevy | DAY | ATL | MAR | KAN | DOV | CLT | TEX | IOW | GTW | KEN | ELD; 21 | POC | BRI | MCH | MSP | CHI | NHA | LVS | TAL | MAR | TEX | PHO | HOM; 19 | 45th | 26 | |

^{*} Season still in progress
^{1} Ineligible for series points

=== ARCA Racing Series ===
(key) (Bold – Pole position awarded by qualifying time. Italics – Pole position earned by points standings or practice time. * – Most laps led.)

ARCA Racing Series results
| Year | Team | No. | Make | 1 | 2 | 3 | 4 | 5 | 6 | 7 | 8 | 9 | 10 | 11 | 12 | 13 | 14 | 15 | 16 | 17 | 18 | 19 | 20 | ARSC | Pts | Ref |
|---|---|---|---|---|---|---|---|---|---|---|---|---|---|---|---|---|---|---|---|---|---|---|---|---|---|---|
| 2016 | Mason Mitchell Motorsports | 98 | Ford | DAY | NSH; 15 | SLM; 18 | | | | | | | | | | | | | | | | | | 24th | 1150 | |
| 2016 | Mason Mitchell Motorsports | 98 | Chevy | | | | | | | POC; 5 | MCH; 6 | MAD | WIN | IOW; 13 | IRP; 25 | POC | BLN | ISF | DSF | SLM | CHI | KEN | KAN | 24th | 1150 | |
| 2016 | Cunningham Motorsports | 22 | Dodge | | | | TAL; 10 | TOL | NJE | | | | | | | | | | | | | | | 24th | 1150 | |
