= Athenian Motorsports =

Former NASCAR team

Athenian Motorsports, LLC
- Owner: Tony Townley
- Base: Concord, North Carolina
- Series: Xfinity Series; Camping World Truck Series; ARCA Racing Series
- Race drivers: Xfinity Series: 05. John Wes Townley (part-time); Camping World Truck Series: 05. John Wes Townley, Parker Kligerman, Brady Boswell, Cody Coughlin, Dylan Lupton, Matt DiBenedetto; ARCA Racing Series: 05. John Wes Townley, Cole Custer
- Manufacturer: Chevrolet
- Opened: 2014
- Closed: 2016

Career
- Debut: Xfinity Series: 2014 Aaron's 312 (Talladega); Camping World Truck Series: 2014 American Ethanol 200 (Iowa); ARCA Racing Series: 2016 Lucas Oil 200 (Daytona)
- Latest race: Xfinity Series: 2016 Sparks Energy 300 (Talladega); Camping World Truck Series: 2016 Ford EcoBoost 200 (Homestead)
- Races competed: Total: 114; Xfinity Series: 41; Camping World Truck Series: 59; ARCA Racing Series: 14
- Drivers' Championships: Total: 0 Xfinity Series: 0 Camping World Truck Series: 0 ARCA Racing Series: 0
- Race victories: Total: 2 Xfinity Series: 0 Camping World Truck Series: 1 ARCA Racing Series: 1
- Pole positions: Total: 3 Xfinity Series: 0 Camping World Truck Series: 2 ARCA Racing Series: 1

Athenian Motorsports was an American professional stock car racing team that last competed in the NASCAR Xfinity Series, the Camping World Truck Series, and the ARCA Racing Series. In the Xfinity Series, the team last fielded the No. 05 Zaxby's Chevrolet Camaro part-time for John Wes Townley. In the Camping World Truck Series, the team last fielded the No. 05 Zaxby's Chevrolet Silverado full-time for part-time drivers: John Wes Townley, Parker Kligerman, Brady Boswell, Cody Coughlin, and Matt DiBenedetto. In the ARCA Racing Series, the team last fielded the No. 05 Zaxby's Chevrolet Impala part-time for Townley. The team was sponsored by Zaxby's Chicken Restaurants, co-founded by John Wes' father and team owner Tony Townley, and the team name is likely a reference to the company's home in Athens, Georgia. The team closed down in 2017, and sold its owner points to MDM Motorsports' No. 99 team.

== History ==
The team debuted in May 2014 in the Nationwide Series (now Xfinity Series) running a partial schedule. In July 2014, the team expanded their operation into the Camping World Truck Series. In September, it was announced that veteran crew chief Mike Ford would join the team as the crew chief for the No. 25 Nationwide Series team, while Mike Beam would stay on as the crew chief of the No. 05 truck. The team also purchased the race shop of Richard Petty Motorsports owned by Boris Said near the Concord Regional Airport.

In November 2014 the team announced it would switch to Chevrolet and run full-time in both the Xfinity Series and Truck Series, with engines supplied by Hendrick Motorsports, and equipment purchased from Kyle Busch Motorsports and the defunct Turner Scott Motorsports (a former Hendrick-affiliated team). Townley would pilot the Truck Series entry full-time and run the majority of the Xfinity Series races.

== Xfinity Series ==
=== Car No. 25 history ===
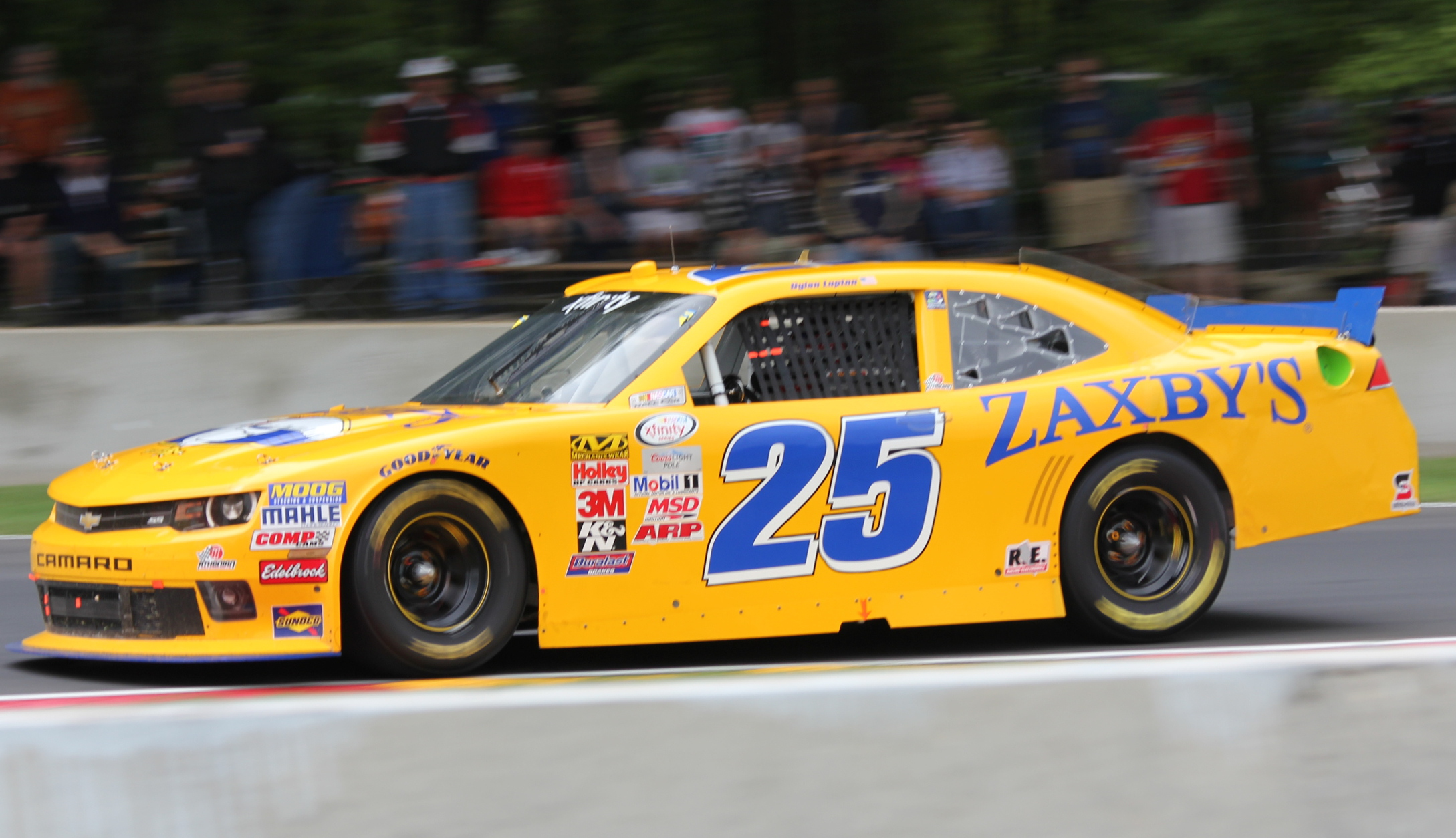
Dylan Lupton at Road America in 2015.

The team debuted in the Nationwide Series with John Wes Townley at Talladega in May 2014, finishing 13th. They ran car No. 25, which Townley had run the previous year with Venturini Motorsports part-time. The team announced on May 7 that it would compete in 12 additional Nationwide races in 2014, while Townley would continue to run the full season in Trucks with Wauters Motorsports and the ARCA Racing Series with Venturini. Beginning at the Nationwide Series race at Chicagoland in July and continuing at Indianapolis in July and Bristol in August, Athenian Motorsports announced a three-race sponsorship with the movie The Identical, running on the hood of the Zaxby's Toyota Camry.

In an August 2014 conversation with Motorsport.com, John Wes Townley said that Athenian Motorsports was preparing to run the full 2015 season in the Xfinity Series. The team expanded full-time for 2015, with Townley running 24 Xfinity races. The remaining races were to be filled by a driver with sponsorship. In February, it was announced that K&N Pro Series West driver and NASCAR Next member Dylan Lupton was hired to run a minimum of seven races in the No. 25 starting at Phoenix International Raceway, with continued sponsorship from Zaxby's. Lupton qualified 23rd and finished 19th in his debut at Phoenix. Alex Bowman drove two races at Michigan and Indianapolis due to drivers busy competing in their Series. The team withdrew from the October race at Dover, operating on a race-by-race basis for the remainder of the season.

The team returned in 2016 only running in the restrictor plate races. With Rick Ware Racing receiving the No. 25, the team changed to the No. 05, used in its other operations.

==== Car No. 25 results ====
Year	Driver	No.	Make	1	2	3	4	5	6	7	8	9	10	11	12	13	14	15	16	17	18	19	20	21	22	23	24	25	26	27	28	29	30	31	32	33	NXSC	Pts
2014	John Wes Townley	25	Chevy	DAY	PHO	LVS	BRI	CAL	TEX	DAR	RCH	TAL; 13	IOW	CLT; 22	DOV	MCH	ROA	KEN; Wth	DAY; 18	NHA	CHI; 27	IND; 28	IOW	GLN	MOH	BRI; 18	ATL; 32	RCH	CHI	KEN	DOV	KAN; 31	CLT	TEX; 23	PHO; 23	HOM; 33	38th	217
2015	John Wes Townley	25	Chevy	DAY; 33	ATL; 27	LVS; 19		CAL; 23	TEX; 17	BRI; 14		TAL; 15	IOW; 13	CLT; 29	DOV; 15			DAY; 19	KEN; 32				GLN; 39		BRI; 23		DAR; 26	RCH; 30	CHI; 13		DOV; Wth	CLT; 22	KAN	TEX	PHO	HOM	25th	619
2015	Dylan Lupton	25	Chevy				PHO; 19				RCH; 28						CHI; 34			NHA; 24		IOW; 17		MOH; 9		ROA; 13				KEN; 31							25th	619
2015	Alex Bowman	25	Chevy													MCH; 14					IND; 17																25th	619
2016	John Wes Townley	05	Chevy	DAY; 17	ATL	LVS	PHO	CAL	TEX	BRI	RCH	TAL; 26	DOV	CLT	POC	MCH	IOW	DAY; Wth	KEN	NHA	IND	IOW	GLN	MOH	BRI	ROA	DAR	RCH	CHI	KEN	DOV	CLT	KAN	TEX	PHO	HOM	50th	39

== Camping World Truck Series ==
=== Truck No. 05 history ===
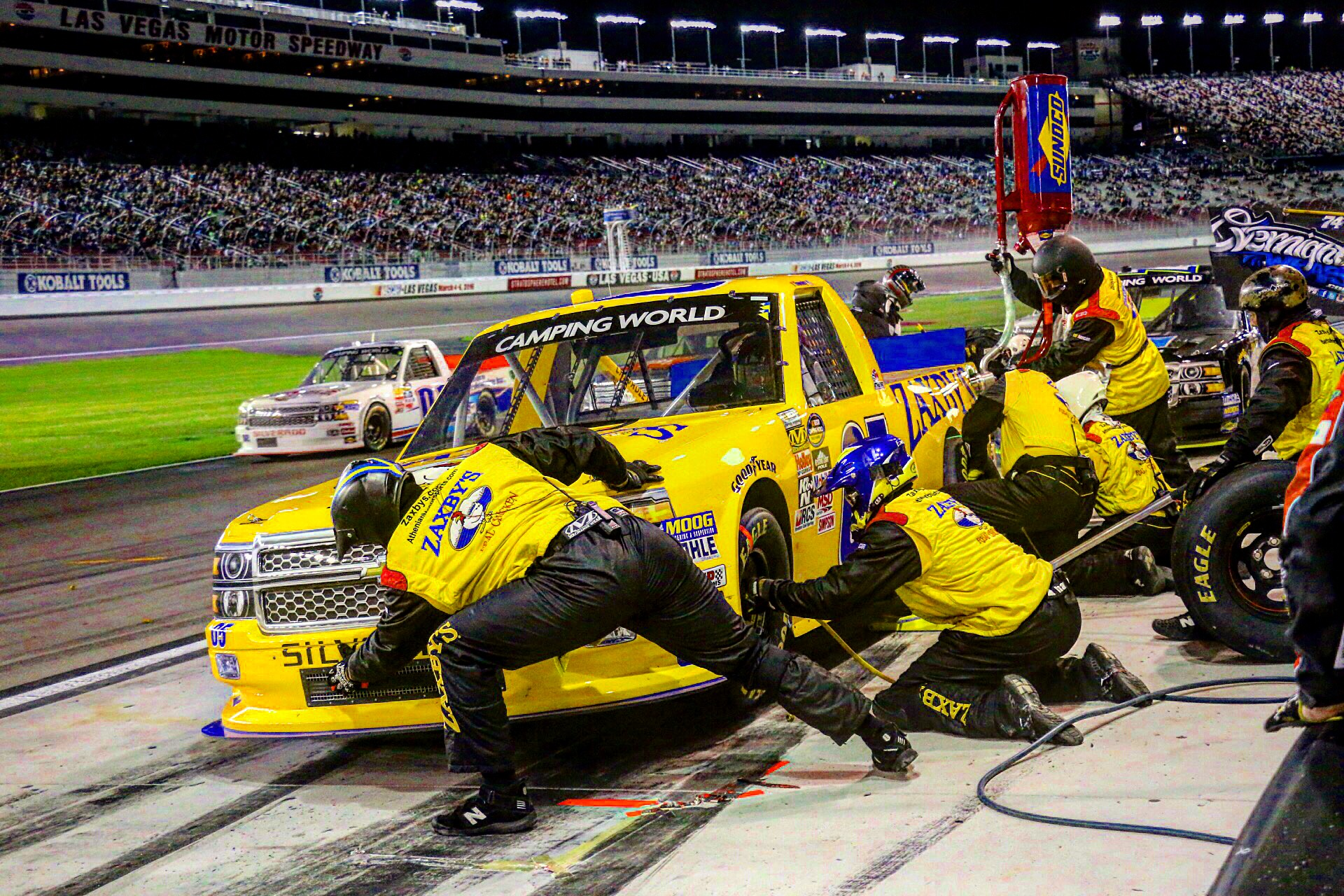
Townley's crew performs a pit stop at Las Vegas Motor Speedway in 2015

Initially, Athenian Motorsports was to have begun their Camping World Truck Series efforts in 2015 with John Wes Townley. After eight 2014 starts and two top five finishes in the Truck Series however, in July Townley left Wauters Motorsports' No. 5 Tundra, moving to the No. 05 Tundra owned by his father starting at Iowa. After Townley suffered a concussion at Pocono during an ARCA race, Clint Bowyer drove the No. 05 Zaxby's truck for Athenian in the Truck Series race that weekend. Bowyer, who had previously been sponsored by Zaxby's in 2010, finished fourth in the race. 2003 Truck Champion Travis Kvapil replaced Townley at Michigan. Kvapil qualified well and ran up front early, but blew the engine on lap 8. Townley returned at Bristol in August, running an all black 05 Zaxby's Tundra. Townley had a top 15 truck, but wrecked racing young NTS drivers Gray Gaulding and Brennan Newberry.

Townley returned to the No. 05 truck for 2015, with the team switching to Chevrolet. Former Truck Series winner Terry Cook would serve as the team's spotter. Townley would score his first career victory on October 3 at Las Vegas Motor Speedway, taking the lead with six laps to go and winning on a fuel mileage gamble. Townley finished eighth in the championship standings.

Townley returned full-time for 2016, though Parker Kligerman drove at Kentucky Speedway due to Townley undergoing treatment for a possible concussion. Next week, 19 year-old Brady Boswell took over the No. 05 ride with Townley still injured at Eldora.

==== Truck No. 05 results ====
Year	Driver	No.	Make	1	2	3	4	5	6	7	8	9	10	11	12	13	14	15	16	17	18	19	20	21	22	23	NCWTC	Pts
2014	John Wes Townley	05	Toyota	DAY	MAR	KAN	CLT	DOV	TEX	GTW	KEN	IOW; 22	ELD; 19			BRI; 29	MSP	CHI; 15	NHA; 18	LVS; 11	TAL; 8	MAR; 33	TEX; 20	PHO; 33	HOM; 35		28th	301
2014	Clint Bowyer	05	Toyota											POC; 4													28th	301
2014	Travis Kvapil	05	Toyota												MCH; 26												28th	301
2015	John Wes Townley	05	Chevy	DAY; 22	ATL; 12	MAR; 8	KAN; 12	CLT; 6	DOV; 18	TEX; 3	GTW; 11	IOW; 10	KEN; 8	ELD; 14	POC; 17	MCH; 17	BRI; 11	MSP; 25	CHI; 10	NHA; 26	LVS; 1	TAL; 16	MAR; 11	TEX; 17	PHO; 3	HOM; 10	11th	730
2016	John Wes Townley	05	Chevy	DAY; 26	ATL; 7	MAR; 21	KAN; 26	DOV; 29	CLT; 16	TEX; 17	IOW; 19	GTW; 23			POC; 29	BRI; 10	MCH; 12	MSP; 12	CHI; 20	NHA; 12	LVS; 13	TAL; 28	MAR; 21				18th	314
2016	Parker Kligerman	05	Chevy										KEN; 19														18th	314
2016	Brady Boswell	05	Chevy											ELD; 21												HOM; 19	18th	314
2016	Cody Coughlin	05	Chevy																					TEX; 28			18th	314
2016	Dylan Lupton	05	Chevy																						PHO; 19		18th	314

== ARCA Racing Series ==
=== Car No. 05 history ===
In 2016, the team ran the No. 05 Zaxby's Chevrolet full-time in the ARCA Racing Series, with John Wes Townley running the majority of the season. The team won its ARCA debut at Daytona with JWT.

== See also ==
- Zaxby's
- Wauters Motorsports
- Venturini Motorsports
