= Cameron Hayley =

Canadian racing driver (born 1996)

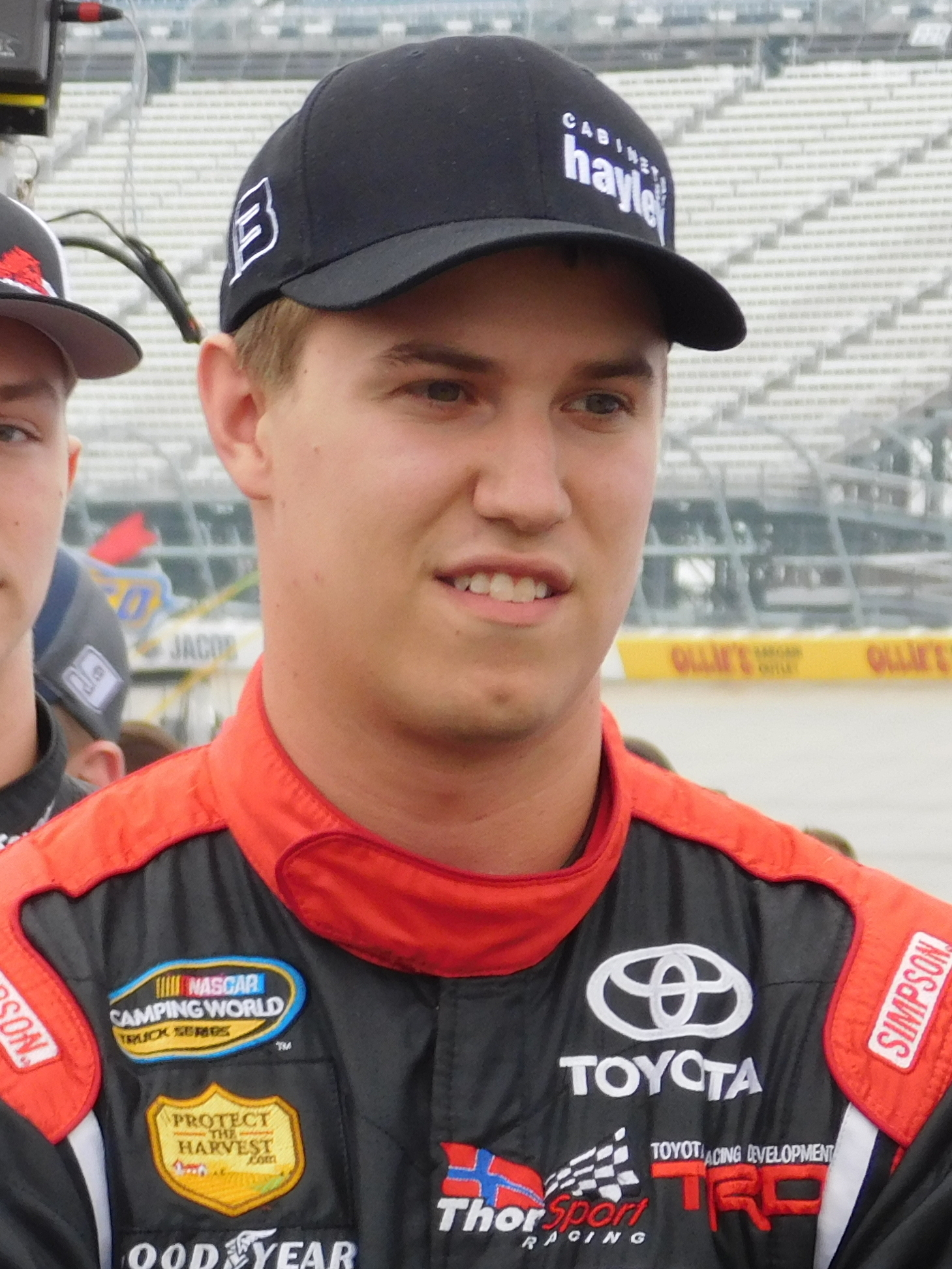
- Hayley at Dover International Speedway in 2016
- Born: July 21, 1996 (age 30); Calgary, Alberta, Canada
- Height: 6 ft 3 in (1.91 m)

NASCAR FedEx Freight Truck Series career
- 49 races run over 3 years
- 2016 position: 11th
- Best finish: 6th (2015)
- First race: 2014 Chevrolet Silverado 250 (Bowmanville)
- Last race: 2016 Ford EcoBoost 200 (Homestead)
Wins	Top tens	Poles
0	25	0

NASCAR Canada Series career
- 2 races run over 1 year
- Best finish: 31st (2013)
- First race: 2013 A&W Cruisin' the Dub 300 (Vernon)
- Last race: 2013 Velocity Prairie Thunder (Saskatoon)
Wins	Top tens	Poles
0	2	0
- Statistics up to date as of May 5, 2019.

Cameron Hayley (born July 21, 1996) is a Canadian professional stock car racing driver. He currently competes part-time in the SPEARS Southwest Tour Series, driving the No. 7 Ford Fusion for Jefferson Pitts Racing. Hayley won the K&N Pro Series race at the inaugural UNOH Battle at the Beach at Daytona International Speedway in 2013.

== Early and personal life ==
Hayley grew up in Calgary, Alberta. At the age of four, he began running practice laps in go-karts. Hayley began racing competitively in karts in 2004 at age seven, finishing third in his first event. He would go on to win both the Rookie of the Year award and championship in Calgary's Junior 1 Championships. Hayley won both the Calgary and Edmonton Jr. Championships the next year. Hayley won his third straight Calgary championship in 2006, winning every karting event he entered. From 2007 to 2010, he competed in Mini-Max karts, several divisions of the Miniature Motorsports Racing Association (MMRA), Legends cars, and Super Late Models. Hayley would compete in events in the American states of North Dakota, Nevada, Washington, and Montana.

Hayley's family owns Hayley Industrial Electronics Ltd. (founded in 1978) as well as longtime sponsor Cabinets by Hayley, a Canadian company which produces steel cabinets. According to Haley, the latter business was started by his father to fund his racing career.

== Racing career ==
In 2011, at the age of 15, Hayley began racing in the regional K&N Pro Series West for longtime owner Bill McAnally. Hayley became the youngest driver ever to run a NASCAR sanctioned race. Hayley ran four races that season, and the full 2012 season for McAnally, scoring seven top fives and 11 top tens in total. Hayley was also named to the NASCAR Next 9, along with future national series drivers Ryan Blaney, Chase Elliott, Dylan Kwasniewski, Corey LaJoie, Kyle Larson, and Daniel Suárez. For 2013, Hayley moved to Glen Price Motorsports. Hayley won the exhibition UNOH Battle at the Beach (the successor to the Toyota All-Star Showdown) at Daytona to open the season. Hayley scored his first points-paying West Series victory at All American Speedway. The win, along with six poles and 12 top five finishes led Hayley to a second-place finish in points. Hayley also made his debut in the K&N Pro Series East at Richmond, and ran two races in the NASCAR Canadian Tire Series for D. J. Kennington.

For 2014, Hayley moved to the K&N Pro Series East full-time with Turner Scott Motorsports, driving the No. 98 Chevrolet Impala that had won the championship the year before with Dylan Kwasniewski. Hayley earned a pole and seven top fives to finish second in points behind teammate Ben Rhodes.

Also in 2014, Hayley made the drive to Evergreen Speedway in Monroe, WA for the 2014 Summer Showdown with his Cabinets By Hayley Super Late Model team. He started on the pole and led every lap to claim the $25,000 winners purse.

=== Camping World Truck Series ===
Hayley would also make his national series debut in the Camping World Truck Series in TSM's No. 32 Chevrolet Silverado at Canadian Tire Motorsports Park in Ontario. Hayley ran three races for TSM in the Truck Series, with a sixth-place finish at Loudon.

For 2015, Hayley was signed by ThorSport Racing to drive their No. 13 Toyota Tundra, replacing Jeb Burton. He had a solid season by finishing sixth in points, runner up to Erik Jones for the rookie of the year title. Hayley returned to ThorSport Racing in 2016, where he finished 11th in points with 11 top-ten finishes. He left the team after the season ended due to lack of sponsorship.

== Motorsports career results ==
=== NASCAR ===
(key) (Bold – Pole position awarded by qualifying time. Italics – Pole position earned by points standings or practice time. * – Most laps led.)

==== Camping World Truck Series ====
NASCAR Camping World Truck Series results
Year	Team	No.	Make	1	2	3	4	5	6	7	8	9	10	11	12	13	14	15	16	17	18	19	20	21	22	23	NCWTC	Pts	Ref
2014	Turner Scott Motorsports	32	Chevy	DAY	MAR	KAN	CLT	DOV	TEX	GTW	KEN	IOW	ELD	POC	MCH	BRI	MSP; 11	CHI	NHA; 6	LVS	TAL	MAR					40th	105	
2014	Turner Scott Motorsports	30	Chevy																				TEX; 10	PHO	HOM		40th	105	
2015	ThorSport Racing	13	Toyota	DAY; 23	ATL; 14	MAR; 11	KAN; 5	CLT; 14	DOV; 21	TEX; 7	GTW; 5	IOW; 19	KEN; 9	ELD; 8	POC; 4	MCH; 10	BRI; 18	MSP; 7	CHI; 16	NHA; 12	LVS; 10	TAL; 6	MAR; 3	TEX; 10	PHO; 11	HOM; 9	6th	766	
2016	ThorSport Racing	13	Toyota	DAY; 25	ATL; 2	MAR; 9	KAN; 19	DOV; 19	CLT; 15	TEX; 18	IOW; 3	GTW; 24	KEN; 6	ELD; 7	POC; 2	BRI; 24	MCH; 5	MSP; 9	CHI; 3	NHA; 19	LVS; 18	TAL; 19	MAR; 11	TEX; 10	PHO; 4	HOM; 16	11th	502	

==== K&N Pro Series East ====
K&N Pro Series East results
Year	Team	No.	Make	1	2	3	4	5	6	7	8	9	10	11	12	13	14	15	16	Rank	Points	Ref
2013	Gene Price Motorsports	24	Ford	BRI	GRE	FIF	RCH; 32	BGS	IOW	LGY	COL	IOW	VIR	GRE	NHA	DOV	RAL			75th	12	
2014	Turner Scott Motorsports	98	Chevy	NSM 2	DAY; 14	BRI; 17	GRE; 3	RCH; 6	IOW; 12	BGS; 18	FIF; 3	LGY; 2	NHA; 15	COL; 2*	IOW; 15	GLN; 8	VIR; 2*	GRE; 2	DOV; 13	2nd	580	

==== K&N Pro Series West ====
K&N Pro Series West results
Year	Team	No.	Make	1	2	3	4	5	6	7	8	9	10	11	12	13	14	15	Rank	Points	Ref
2011	Bill McAnally Racing	24	Toyota	PHO	AAS	MMP	IOW	LVS	SON	IRW	EVG	PIR	CNS	MRP; 2	SPO; 18	AAS; 3	PHO; 40		30th	492	
2012	Bill McAnally Racing	24	Toyota	PHO; 22	LVC; 6	MMP; 8	S99; 14	IOW; 6	BIR; 12	LVS; 5	SON; 10	EVG; 19	CNS; 3	IOW; 2	PIR; 22	SMP; 15	AAS; 5	PHO; 5	7th	493	
2013	Gene Price Motorsports	24	Ford	PHO; 2	**S99**; 3	BIR; 5	IOW; 3	**L44**; 7*	**SON**; 2	CNS; 3	**IOW**; 2	**EVG**; 10	**SPO**; 3	MMP; 6	SMP; 3	AAS; 1	KCR; 5	PHO; 3	2nd	616	

==== Canadian Tire Series ====
NASCAR Canadian Tire Series results
Year	Team	No.	Make	1	2	3	4	5	6	7	8	9	10	11	12	Rank	Points	Ref
2013	DJK Racing	28	Dodge	MOS	DEL	MOS	ICAR	MPS; 7	SAS; 9	ASE	CTR	RIS	MOS	BAR	KWA	31st	73	

^{*} Season still in progress
^{1} Ineligible for series points
