= 2015 Mudsummer Classic =

Race details
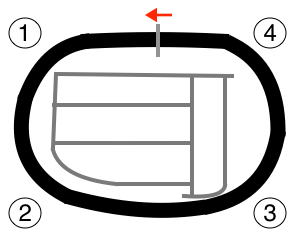
- Map of track
- Date: July 22, 2015
- Official name: 2015 1-800 Carcash Mudsummer Classic
- Location: Eldora Speedway in Rossburg, Ohio
- Course: Dirt Track
- Course length: 0.5 miles (0.804 km)
- Distance: 154 laps, 77 mi (123.919 km)
- Scheduled distance: 150 laps, 75 mi (121 km)

Pole position
Driver	Bobby Pierce	MB Motorsports
- Time: 20.716

Most laps led
Driver	Christopher Bell	Kyle Busch Motorsports
- Laps: 106

Winner
No. 54	Christopher Bell	Kyle Busch Motorsports

Television in the United States
- Network: Fox Sports 1
- Announcers: Ralph Sheheen, Phil Parsons, Michael Waltrip

The 2015 1-800 CarCash Mudsummer Classic was a NASCAR Camping World Truck Series race. The race was the third iteration of the event. The race was also the 11th of the season. The race was held on July 22, 2015, at Eldora Speedway in Rossburg, Ohio. The race was scheduled for 150 laps but was extended to 154 due to a green-white-checker finish. Bobby Pierce won the pole but it was Christopher Bell who led the most laps at 106 and won the race.

== Background ==
Eldora Speedway (nicknamed "The Big E", "Auto Racing's Showcase Since 1954," and "The World's Greatest Dirt Track") is a 0.5 mi (804.672 m) high-banked clay dirt oval. Located north of Rossburg, Ohio in the village of New Weston, Ohio, it features permanent and festival-style seating believed to be in the range of 30,000. The 22,000 permanent grandstand and VIP suite seats make it the largest sports stadium in the Dayton, Ohio-region according to the Dayton Business Journal.

== Entry list ==
- (R) denotes rookie driver
- (i) denotes driver who is ineligible for series driver points

#	Driver	Team	Make
00	Cole Custer	JR Motorsports	Chevrolet
1	Travis Kvapil	MAKE Motorsports	Chevrolet
02	Tyler Young	Young's Motorsports	Chevrolet
03	Jake Griffin	Mike Affarano Motorsports	Chevrolet
4	Erik Jones (R)	Kyle Busch Motorsports	Toyota
05	John Wes Townley	Athenian Motorsports	Chevrolet
6	Norm Benning	Norm Benning Racing	Chevrolet
07	Ray Black Jr. (R)	SS-Green Light Racing	Chevrolet
08	Korbin Forrister (R)	SS-Green Light Racing	Chevrolet
8	John Hunter Nemechek (R)	SWM-NEMCO Motorsports	Chevrolet
10	Jennifer Jo Cobb	Jennifer Jo Cobb Racing	Chevrolet
11	Ben Kennedy	Red Horse Racing	Toyota
13	Cameron Hayley (R)	ThorSport Racing	Toyota
14	Daniel Hemric (R)	NTS Motorsports	Chevrolet
15	Chad Boat	Billy Boat Motorsports	Chevrolet
17	Timothy Peters	Red Horse Racing	Toyota
19	Tyler Reddick	Brad Keselowski Racing	Ford
23	Spencer Gallagher (R)	GMS Racing	Chevrolet
29	Brad Keselowski (i)	Brad Keselowski Racing	Ford
31	Austin Dillon (i)	NTS Motorsports	Chevrolet
33	Ty Dillon (i)	GMS Racing	Chevrolet
35	Cody Erickson	Empire Racing	Chevrolet
45	Chris Fontaine	B. J. McLeod Motorsports	Chevrolet
50	Jody Knowles	Tracy Wallace Racing	Ford
51	Matt Tifft	Kyle Busch Motorsports	Toyota
52	Ken Schrader	Ken Schrader Racing	Toyota
54	Christopher Bell	Kyle Busch Motorsports	Toyota
63	Bobby Pierce	MB Motorsports	Chevrolet
74	Stew Hayward	Mike Harmon Racing	Ram
80	Madeline Crane	Tracy Wallace Racing	Ford
82	Sean Corr	Empire Racing	Ford
88	Matt Crafton	ThorSport Racing	Toyota
94	Wendell Chavous (R)	Premium Motorsports	Chevrolet
98	Johnny Sauter	ThorSport Racing	Toyota
Official entry list

== Qualifying ==
Bobby Pierce won the pole with a time of 20.716 and a speed of 86.889. It would be his only career NASCAR pole.

Pos.	#	Driver	Team	Make	Time	Speed
1	63	Bobby Pierce	MB Motorsports	Chevrolet	20.716	86.889
2	98	Johnny Sauter	ThorSport Racing	Toyota	21.222	84.818
3	07	Ray Black Jr. (R)	SS-Green Light Racing	Chevrolet	21.285	84.567
4	13	Cameron Hayley (R)	ThorSport Racing	Toyota	21.332	84.380
5	05	John Wes Townley	Athenian Motorsports	Chevrolet	21.350	84.309
6	02	Tyler Young	Young's Motorsports	Chevrolet	21.412	84.065
7	88	Matt Crafton	ThorSport Racing	Toyota	21.497	83.733
8	1	Travis Kvapil	MAKE Motorsports	Chevrolet	21.501	83.717
9	54	Christopher Bell	Kyle Busch Motorsports	Toyota	21.536	83.581
10	19	Tyler Reddick	Brad Keselowski Racing	Ford	21.548	83.534
11	10	Jennifer Jo Cobb	Jennifer Jo Cobb Racing	Chevrolet	21.624	83.241
12	14	Daniel Hemric (R)	NTS Motorsports	Chevrolet	21.649	83.145
13	17	Timothy Peters	Red Horse Racing	Toyota	21.656	83.118
14	35	Cody Erickson	Empire Racing	Chevrolet	21.700	82.949
15	31	Austin Dillon (i)	NTS Motorsports	Chevrolet	21.766	82.698
16	08	Korbin Forrister (R)	SS-Green Light Racing	Chevrolet	21.803	82.557
17	8	John Hunter Nemechek (R)	SWM-NEMCO Motorsports	Chevrolet	21.814	82.516
18	52	Ken Schrader	Ken Schrader Racing	Toyota	21.911	82.151
19	15	Chad Boat	Billy Boat Motorsports	Chevrolet	21.946	82.020
20	33	Ty Dillon (i)	GMS Racing	Chevrolet	21.966	81.945
21	29	Brad Keselowski (i)	Brad Keselowski Racing	Ford	21.984	81.878
22	11	Ben Kennedy	Red Horse Racing	Toyota	22.067	81.570
23	6	Norm Benning	Norm Benning Racing	Chevrolet	22.092	81.477
24	4	Erik Jones (R)	Kyle Busch Motorsports	Toyota	22.114	81.396
25	50	Jody Knowles	Tracy Wallace Racing	Ford	22.130	81.338
26	45	Chris Fontaine	B. J. McLeod Motorsports	Chevrolet	22.143	81.290
27	51	Matt Tifft	Kyle Busch Motorsports	Toyota	22.251	80.895
28	23	Spencer Gallagher (R)	GMS Racing	Chevrolet	22.332	80.602
29	03	Jake Griffin	Mike Affarano Motorsports	Chevrolet	22.441	80.210
30	82	Sean Corr	Empire Racing	Ford	22.728	79.197
31	74	Stew Hayward	Mike Harmon Racing	Ram	22.757	79.097
32	94	Wendell Chavous (R)	Premium Motorsports	Chevrolet	22.905	78.585
33	80	Madeline Crane	Tracy Wallace Racing	Ford	24.500	73.469
34	00	Cole Custer	JR Motorsports	Chevrolet	—	—
Official Qualifying Results

== Qualifying heat races ==
Drivers will be split into five different heat races, all 10 laps, and their finish will determine the starting lineup. Drivers who finish in the top 5 in each heat will advance into the main event. The remaining drivers will compete in the "last chance" qualifier race, which will be 15 laps, and whoever finishes in the top 5, advances.

=== Heat 1 ===
Fin.	St.	#	Driver	Team	Make	Laps	Led	Status
1	1	63	Bobby Pierce	MB Motorsports	Chevrolet	10	10	running
2	2	02	Tyler Young	Young's Motorsports	Chevrolet	10	0	running
3	5	29	Brad Keselowski (i)	Brad Keselowski Racing	Ford	10	0	running
4	4	08	Korbin Forrister (R)	SS-Green Light Racing	Chevrolet	10	0	running
5	6	45	Chris Fontaine	B. J. McLeod Motorsports	Chevrolet	10	0	running
6	3	10	Jennifer Jo Cobb	Jennifer Jo Cobb Racing	Chevrolet	10	0	running
7	7	74	Stew Hayward	Mike Harmon Racing	Ram	10	0	running

=== Heat 2 ===
Fin.	St.	#	Driver	Team	Make	Laps	Led	Status
1	4	8	John Hunter Nemechek (R)	SWM-NEMCO Motorsports	Chevrolet	10	2	running
2	1	98	Johnny Sauter	ThorSport Racing	Toyota	10	8	running
3	2	88	Matt Crafton	ThorSport Racing	Toyota	10	0	running
4	3	14	Daniel Hemric (R)	NTS Motorsports	Chevrolet	10	0	running
5	6	51	Matt Tifft	Kyle Busch Motorsports	Toyota	10	0	running
6	5	11	Ben Kennedy	Red Horse Racing	Toyota	10	0	running
7	7	94	Wendell Chavous (R)	Premium Motorsports	Chevrolet	10	0	running

=== Heat 3 ===
Fin.	St.	#	Driver	Team	Make	Laps	Led	Status
1	4	52	Ken Schrader	Ken Schrader Racing	Toyota	10	8	running
2	3	17	Timothy Peters	Red Horse Racing	Toyota	10	1	running
3	5	6	Norm Benning	Norm Benning Racing	Chevrolet	10	0	running
4	6	23	Spencer Gallagher (R)	GMS Racing	Chevrolet	10	0	running
5	1	07	Ray Black Jr. (R)	SS-Green Light Racing	Chevrolet	10	0	running
6	2	1	Travis Kvapil	MAKE Motorsports	Chevrolet	10	1	running
7	7	80	Madeline Crane	Tracy Wallace Racing	Ford	10	0	running

=== Heat 4 ===
Fin.	St.	#	Driver	Team	Make	Laps	Led	Status
1	2	54	Christopher Bell	Kyle Busch Motorsports	Toyota	10	10	running
2	1	13	Cameron Hayley (R)	ThorSport Racing	Toyota	10	0	running
3	4	15	Chad Boat	Billy Boat Motorsports	Chevrolet	10	0	running
4	5	4	Erik Jones (R)	Kyle Busch Motorsports	Toyota	10	0	running
5	7	00	Cole Custer	JR Motorsports	Chevrolet	10	0	running
6	3	35	Cody Erickson	Empire Racing	Chevrolet	10	0	running
7	6	03	Jake Griffin	Mike Affarano Motorsports	Chevrolet	10	0	running

=== Heat 5 ===
Fin.	St.	#	Driver	Team	Make	Laps	Led	Status
1	2	19	Tyler Reddick	Brad Keselowski Racing	Ford	10	10	running
2	3	31	Austin Dillon (i)	NTS Motorsports	Chevrolet	10	0	running
3	4	33	Ty Dillon (i)	GMS Racing	Chevrolet	10	0	running
4	1	05	John Wes Townley	Athenian Motorsports	Chevrolet	10	0	running
5	6	82	Sean Corr	Empire Racing	Ford	10	0	running
6	5	50	Jody Knowles	Tracy Wallace Racing	Ford	10	0	running

=== "Last chance" qualifiers ===
Fin.	St.	#	Driver	Team	Make	Laps	Led	Status
1	4	35	Cody Erickson	Empire Racing	Chevrolet	15	15	running
2	2	11	Ben Kennedy	Red Horse Racing	Toyota	15	0	running
3	3	1	Travis Kvapil	MAKE Motorsports	Chevrolet	15	0	running
4	9	03	Jake Griffin	Mike Affarano Motorsports	Chevrolet	15	0	running
5	5	50	Jody Knowles	Tracy Wallace Racing	Ford	15	0	running
6	1	10	Jennifer Jo Cobb	Jennifer Jo Cobb Racing	Chevrolet	15	0	running
7	6	74	Stew Hayward	Mike Harmon Racing	Ram	15	0	running
8	7	94	Wendell Chavous	Premium Motorsports	Chevrolet	3	0	vibration
9	8	80	Madeline Crane	Tracy Wallace Racing	Ford	0	0	did not start

== Starting lineup ==
Grid	No.	Driver	Team	Manufacturer
1	63	Bobby Pierce	MB Motorsports	Chevrolet
2	8	John Hunter Nemechek (R)	SWM-NEMCO Motorsports	Chevrolet
3	52	Ken Schrader	Ken Schrader Racing	Toyota
4	54	Christopher Bell	Kyle Busch Motorsports	Toyota
5	19	Tyler Reddick	Brad Keselowski Racing	Ford
6	02	Tyler Young	Young's Motorsports	Chevrolet
7	98	Johnny Sauter	ThorSport Racing	Toyota
8	17	Timothy Peters	Red Horse Racing	Toyota
9	13	Cameron Hayley (R)	ThorSport Racing	Toyota
10	31	Austin Dillon (i)	NTS Motorsports	Chevrolet
11	29	Brad Keselowski (i)	Brad Keselowski Racing	Ford
12	88	Matt Crafton	ThorSport Racing	Toyota
13	6	Norm Benning	Norm Benning Racing	Chevrolet
14	15	Chad Boat	Billy Boat Motorsports	Chevrolet
15	33	Ty Dillon (i)	GMS Racing	Chevrolet
16	08	Korbin Forrister (R)	SS-Green Light Racing	Chevrolet
17	14	Daniel Hemric (R)	NTS Motorsports	Chevrolet
18	23	Spencer Gallagher (R)	GMS Racing	Chevrolet
19	4	Erik Jones (R)	Kyle Busch Motorsports	Toyota
20	05	John Wes Townley	Athenian Motorsports	Chevrolet
21	45	Chris Fontaine	B. J. McLeod Motorsports	Chevrolet
22	51	Matt Tifft	Kyle Busch Motorsports	Toyota
23	07	Ray Black Jr. (R)	SS-Green Light Racing	Chevrolet
24	00	Cole Custer	JR Motorsports	Chevrolet
25	82	Sean Corr*	Empire Racing	Ford
26	35	Cody Erickson	Empire Racing	Ford
27	11	Ben Kennedy*	Red Horse Racing	Toyota
28	1	Travis Kvapil	MAKE Motorsports	Chevrolet
29	10	Jennifer Jo Cobb	Jennifer Jo Cobb Racing	Chevrolet
30	50	Jody Knowles	Tracy Wallace Racing	Ford
31	74	Stew Hayward	Mike Harmon Racing	Ram
32	94	Wendell Chavous (R)	Premium Motorsports	Chevrolet
Failed to Qualify
33	03	Jake Griffin	Mike Affarano Motorsports	Chevrolet
34	80	Madeline Crane	Tracy Wallace Racing	Ford
Official Starting lineup

* - Sean Corr and Ben Kennedy had to start at the rear of the field. Corr missed the driver introductions and Kennedy had unapproved adjustments.

== Race ==
Outside pole sitter John Hunter Nemechek took the lead from pole sitter Bobby Pierce and led the first lap of the race. Pierce took the lead from Nemechek the next lap as the two raced side by side for two laps. On lap 6, Austin Dillon made a three wide pass on Pierce and Johnny Sauter and took the lead. The first caution flew on lap 7 when rookie Korbin Forrister spun on the frontstretch. The race restarted on lap 12 with Austin Dillon as the leader. On lap 13, Bobby Pierce took the lead from Dillon. On lap 17, the second caution flew for a six truck crash. It started when Chad Boat spun all by himself on the backstretch and Boat spun down and collected Cody Erickson. Erickson spun up and caught Cole Custer while John Wes Townley, Jody Knowles, and Sean Corr were collected in the crash. The race got back underway on lap 24 with Pierce remaining as the leader. On lap 26, the third caution flew when Korbin Forrister spun on the frontstretch for the second time after Travis Kvapil spun in front of him. The race got back going on lap 32. On lap 37, the fourth caution flew when rookie Wendell Chavous spun in turn two. The race would restart on lap 42. On the restart, Christopher Bell pulled a slide job on Bobby Pierce and was the new leader. On lap 47, the 5th caution flew when Jennifer Jo Cobb spun in turn 4. The race got back going on lap 53. On the next lap, the 6th caution flew when rookie Spencer Gallagher got turned by Chad Boat in turn 1. Trucks soon came in to make pitstops during the caution. Brad Keselowski stayed out and led the field to the restart on lap 61. Bell immediately took the lead from Keselowski. On lap 72, the 7th caution flew for debris on the frontstretch. The race would restart on lap 78 and Bell stayed in the lead.

=== Final laps ===
On lap 94, the 8th caution would fly when Johnny Sauter and Chris Fontaine made contact that sent Fontaine around. The race would restart with 51 laps to go. Bobby Pierce would take the lead from Christopher Bell on the restart. On the next lap, the 9th caution would fly when John Wes Townley spun in turn 2. The race would restart with 45 laps to go. On that restart, Christopher Bell took the lead from Bobby Pierce. With 40 to go, the 10th caution flew for a 4 truck crash in turn 1 that involved Norm Benning, Travis Kvapil, Jennifer Jo Cobb, and Chad Boat. The race would restart with 38 laps to go. With 35 to go, the 11th caution would fly when Jennifer Jo Cobb and Spencer Gallagher spun in turn 2. The race would get back going again with 30 laps to go. With 29 to go, Matt Tifft spun in turn 2 but no caution was thrown. Christopher Bell and Bobby Pierce began to go nose to tail for the lead. With 12 laps to go, the 12th caution flew when Timothy Peters spun in turn 4. The race would restart with 5 laps to go. Bell took the lead and began to pull away. But with 3 laps to go, the 13th and final caution would fly when Korbin Forrister spun on the frontstretch for the third time in the race. The caution would set up a green-white-checker finish. On the restart, Austin Dillon attempted to make a big three wide dive bomb into turn 1 but couldn't make it stick. Christopher Bell would hold off a charge by Bobby Pierce and Bell would win his first Truck Series race in his 3rd Truck Series start. Bobby Pierce, Tyler Reddick, Erik Jones, and Daniel Hemric rounded out the top 5 while Austin Dillon, John Hunter Nemechek, Cameron Hayley, Matt Crafton, and Ty Dillon rounded out the top 10.

== Race results ==
Pos	Car	Driver	Team	Manufacturer	Laps Run	Laps Led	Status	Points
1	54	Christopher Bell	Kyle Busch Motorsports	Toyota	154	106	running	48
2	63	Bobby Pierce	MB Motorsports	Chevrolet	154	39	running	43
3	19	Tyler Reddick	Brad Keselowski Racing	Ford	150	0	running	41
4	4	Erik Jones (R)	Kyle Busch Motorsports	Toyota	154	0	running	40
5	14	Daniel Hemric (R)	NTS Motorsports	Chevrolet	154	0	running	39
6	31	Austin Dillon (i)	NTS Motorsports	Chevrolet	154	8	running	0
7	8	John Hunter Nemechek (R)	SWM-NEMCO Motorsports	Chevrolet	154	1	running	38
8	13	Cameron Hayley (R)	ThorSport Racing	Toyota	154	0	running	36
9	88	Matt Crafton	ThorSport Racing	Toyota	154	0	running	35
10	33	Ty Dillon (i)	GMS Racing	Chevrolet	154	0	running	0
11	52	Ken Schrader	Ken Schrader Racing	Toyota	154	0	running	33
12	11	Ben Kennedy	Red Horse Racing	Toyota	154	0	running	32
13	02	Tyler Young	Young's Motorsports	Chevrolet	154	0	running	31
14	05	John Wes Townley	Athenian Motorsports	Chevrolet	154	0	running	30
15	07	Ray Black Jr. (R)	SS-Green Light Racing	Chevrolet	154	0	running	29
16	45	Chris Fontaine	B. J. McLeod Motorsports	Chevrolet	154	0	running	28
17	23	Spencer Gallagher (R)	GMS Racing	Chevrolet	154	0	running	27
18	50	Jody Knowles	Tracy Wallace Racing	Ford	154	0	running	26
19	6	Norm Benning	Norm Benning Racing	Chevrolet	154	0	running	25
20	82	Sean Corr	Empire Racing	Ford	154	0	running	24
21	51	Matt Tifft	Kyle Busch Motorsports	Toyota	154	0	running	23
22	98	Johnny Sauter	ThorSport Racing	Toyota	153	0	running	22
23	17	Timothy Peters	Red Horse Racing	Toyota	153	0	running	21
24	08	Korbin Forrister (R)	SS-Green Light Racing	Chevrolet	153	0	running	20
25	35	Cody Erickson	Empire Racing	Chevrolet	153	0	running	19
26	94	Wendell Chavous (R)	Premium Motorsports	Chevrolet	152	0	running	18
27	10	Jennifer Jo Cobb	Jennifer Jo Cobb Racing	Chevrolet	151	0	running	17
28	29	Brad Keselowski (i)	Brad Keselowski Racing	Ford	144	0	running	0
29	00	Cole Custer	JR Motorsports	Chevrolet	136	0	running	15
30	1	Travis Kvapil	MAKE Motorsports	Chevrolet	119	0	crash	14
31	15	Chad Boat	Billy Boat Motorsports	Chevrolet	110	0	crash	13
32	74	Stew Hayward	Mike Harmon Racing	Ram	79	0	engine	12
Official Race Results

Previous race: 2015 UNOH 225	NASCAR Camping World Truck Series; 2015 season	Next race: 2015 Pocono Mountains 150
