= 2015 Chevrolet Silverado 250 =

15th race of the 2015 NASCAR Camping World Truck Series

Race details
- Race 15 of 23 of the 2015 NASCAR Camping World Truck Series
- Date: August 30, 2015
- Official name: 3rd Annual Chevrolet Silverado 250
- Location: Canadian Tire Motorsport Park, Bowmanville, Ontario, Canada
- Course: Permanent racing facility
- Course length: 2.459 miles (3.957 km)
- Distance: 64 laps, 157 mi (157 km)
- Scheduled distance: 64 laps, 157 mi (253 km)
- Average speed: 83.476 mph (134.342 km/h)

Pole position
Driver	Alex Tagliani	Brad Keselowski Racing
- Time: 1:20.275

Most laps led
Driver	Cole Custer	JR Motorsports
- Laps: 22

Winner
No. 4	Erik Jones	Kyle Busch Motorsports

Television in the United States
- Network: FS1
- Announcers: Ralph Sheheen, Phil Parsons, and Michael Waltrip

Radio in the United States
- Radio: MRN

The 2015 Chevrolet Silverado 250 was the 15th stock car race of the 2015 NASCAR Camping World Truck Series, and the 3rd iteration of the event. The race was held on Sunday, August 30, 2015, in Bowmanville, Ontario, Canada at Canadian Tire Motorsport Park, a 2.459 mile (3.957 km) permanent road course. The race took the scheduled 64 laps to complete. Erik Jones, driving for Kyle Busch Motorsports, would hold off the field on the final restart, and led the final two laps to earn his sixth career NASCAR Camping World Truck Series win, and his second of the season. Jones and Cole Custer dominated the majority of the race, leading 19 and 22 laps. Pole-sitter Alex Tagliani lead eight laps, and ran second on the final lap before experiencing issues and ultimately finished in fifth. To fill out the podium, Matt Crafton, driving for his team, ThorSport Racing, and Ben Kennedy, driving for Red Horse Racing, would finish 2nd and 3rd, respectively.

== Background ==
Canadian Tire Motorsport Park (formerly Mosport Park and Mosport International Raceway) is a multi-track motorsport venue located north of Bowmanville, in Ontario, Canada, 64-kilometre (40 mi) east of Toronto. The facility features a 3.957 km (2.459 mi), 10-turn road course; a 2.9 km (1.8 mi) advance driver and race driver training facility with a 0.402 km (0.250 mi) skid pad (Driver Development Centre) and a 1.5 km (0.93 mi) kart track (Mosport Karting Centre Inc., previously "Mosport Kartways"). The name "Mosport", a portmanteau of Motor Sport, came from the enterprise formed to build the track.

=== Entry list ===
- (R) denotes rookie driver.
- (i) denotes driver who is ineligible for series driver points.

#	Driver	Team	Make	Sponsor
00	Cole Custer	JR Motorsports	Chevrolet	Haas Automation
1	Travis Kvapil	MAKE Motorsports	Chevrolet	Burnie Grill
02	Tyler Young	Young's Motorsports	Chevrolet	Randco, Young's Building Systems
4	Erik Jones (R)	Kyle Busch Motorsports	Toyota	Toyota
05	John Wes Townley	Athenian Motorsports	Chevrolet	Zaxby's
6	Norm Benning	Norm Benning Racing	Chevrolet	Pottier Construction, Parkhill Trucking
07	Ray Black Jr. (R)	SS-Green Light Racing	Chevrolet	ScubaLife
08	Korbin Forrister (R)	BJMM with SS-Green Light Racing	Chevrolet	Trump for President
8	John Hunter Nemechek (R)	SWM-NEMCO Motorsports	Chevrolet	Chevrolet
10	Jennifer Jo Cobb	Jennifer Jo Cobb Racing	Chevrolet	Driven2Honor.org
11	Ben Kennedy	Red Horse Racing	Toyota	Local Motors
13	Cameron Hayley (R)	ThorSport Racing	Toyota	Cabinets by Hayley
14	Daniel Hemric (R)	NTS Motorsports	Chevrolet	California Clean Power
15	Mason Mingus	Billy Boat Motorsports	Chevrolet	Call 811 Before You Dig
17	Timothy Peters	Red Horse Racing	Toyota	Red Horse Racing, Gaunt Collision Center
19	Tyler Reddick	Brad Keselowski Racing	Ford	BBR Music Group
23	Spencer Gallagher (R)	GMS Racing	Chevrolet	Allegiant Travel Company
25	Brian Wong	Venturini Motorsports	Toyota	Momofuku, GT Channel
29	Alex Tagliani (i)	Brad Keselowski Racing	Ford	Cooper-Standard Automotive
33	Brandon Jones (R)	GMS Racing	Chevrolet	Exide, EMCO Corporation
36	Justin Jennings	MB Motorsports	Chevrolet	Mittler Bros., Ski Soda
44	Josh Reaume (i)	Trophy Girl Racing	RAM	Obregon Construction
45	B. J. McLeod	B. J. McLeod Motorsports	Chevrolet	Tilted Kilt
50	Ryan Ellis	MAKE Motorsports	Chevrolet	MAKE Motorsports
51	Matt Tifft	Kyle Busch Motorsports	Toyota	Rally for Kids with Cancer
53	Robert Mitten	NDS Motorsports	RAM	NDS Motorsports
54	Gray Gaulding	Kyle Busch Motorsports	Toyota	Krispy Kreme
63	Daniel Brown	MB Motorsports	Chevrolet	Brown and Geeson Ltd., Mittler Bros.
74	Jordan Anderson	Mike Harmon Racing	Chevrolet	Tri-Analytics, SRGFX.com
88	Matt Crafton	ThorSport Racing	Toyota	Ideal Door, Menards
94	T. J. Bell (i)	Premium Motorsports	Chevrolet	Testoril, Champion Machinery
98	Johnny Sauter	ThorSport Racing	Toyota	Nextant Aerospace, Curb Records
Official entry list

== Practice ==
=== First practice ===
The first practice session was held on Saturday, August 29, at 9:30 AM EST, and would last for 55 minutes. Alex Tagliani, driving for Brad Keselowski Racing, would set the fastest time in the session, with a lap of 1:20.584, and an average speed of 109.853 mph (176.791 km/h).

Pos.	#	Driver	Team	Make	Time	Speed
1	29	Alex Tagliani (i)	Brad Keselowski Racing	Ford	1:20.584	109.853
2	4	Erik Jones (R)	Kyle Busch Motorsports	Toyota	1:21.277	108.916
3	88	Matt Crafton	ThorSport Racing	Toyota	1:21.294	108.894
Full first practice results

=== Final practice ===
The final practice session was held on Saturday, August 29, at 11:35 AM EST, and would last for 1 hour and 25 minutes. Erik Jones, driving for Kyle Busch Motorsports, would set the fastest time in the session, with a lap of 1:20.159, and an average speed of 110.436 mph (177.730 km/h).

Pos.	#	Driver	Team	Make	Time	Speed
1	4	Erik Jones (R)	Kyle Busch Motorsports	Toyota	1:20.159	110.436
2	29	Alex Tagliani (i)	Brad Keselowski Racing	Ford	1:20.211	110.364
3	13	Cameron Hayley (R)	ThorSport Racing	Toyota	1:20.277	110.273
Full final practice results

== Qualifying ==
Qualifying was held on Saturday, August 29, at 5:45 PM EST. The qualifying system used is a multi car, multi lap, two round system where in the first round, everyone would set a time to determine positions 13–32. Then, the fastest 12 qualifiers would move on to the second round to determine positions 1–12.

Alex Tagliani, driving for Brad Keselowski Racing, would win the pole after advancing from the preliminary round and setting the fastest time in Round 2, with a lap of 1:20.084, and an average speed of 110.539 mph (177.895 km/h).

No driver would fail to qualify.

=== Full qualifying results ===
Pos.	#	Driver	Team	Make	Time (R1)	Speed (R1)	Time (R2)	Speed (R2)
1	29	Alex Tagliani (i)	Brad Keselowski Racing	Ford	1:20.294	110.250	1:20.084	110.539
2	4	Erik Jones (R)	Kyle Busch Motorsports	Toyota	1:20.605	109.824	1:20.118	110.492
3	88	Matt Crafton	ThorSport Racing	Toyota	1:20.605	109.824	1:20.394	110.113
4	19	Tyler Reddick	Brad Keselowski Racing	Ford	1:20.275	110.276	1:20.475	110.002
5	00	Cole Custer	JR Motorsports	Chevrolet	1:20.295	110.248	1:20.640	109.777
6	11	Ben Kennedy	Red Horse Racing	Toyota	1:20.348	110.176	1:20.676	109.728
7	13	Cameron Hayley (R)	ThorSport Racing	Toyota	1:21.195	109.026	1:20.758	109.616
8	54	Gray Gaulding	Kyle Busch Motorsports	Toyota	1:20.734	109.649	1:20.854	109.486
9	98	Johnny Sauter	ThorSport Racing	Toyota	1:20.673	109.732	1:21.056	109.213
10	17	Timothy Peters	Red Horse Racing	Toyota	1:20.987	109.306	1:21.141	109.099
11	33	Brandon Jones (R)	GMS Racing	Chevrolet	1:21.289	108.900	1:21.614	108.467
12	8	John Hunter Nemechek (R)	SWM-NEMCO Motorsports	Chevrolet	1:20.898	109.427	1:21.617	108.463
Eliminated from Round 1
13	14	Daniel Hemric (R)	NTS Motorsports	Chevrolet	1:21.331	108.844	–	–
14	23	Spencer Gallagher (R)	GMS Racing	Chevrolet	1:21.349	108.820	–	–
15	51	Matt Tifft	Kyle Busch Motorsports	Toyota	1:21.643	108.428	–	–
16	02	Tyler Young	Young's Motorsports	Chevrolet	1:21.944	108.030	–	–
17	15	Mason Mingus	Billy Boat Motorsports	Chevrolet	1:22.709	107.031	–	–
18	94	T. J. Bell (i)	Premium Motorsports	Chevrolet	1:23.133	106.485	–	–
19	25	Brian Wong	Venturini Motorsports	Toyota	1:23.156	106.455	–	–
20	05	John Wes Townley	Athenian Motorsports	Chevrolet	1:23.593	105.899	–	–
21	63	Daniel Brown	MB Motorsports	Chevrolet	1:23.714	105.746	–	–
22	53	Robert Mitten	NDS Motorsports	RAM	1:23.772	105.673	–	–
23	07	Ray Black Jr. (R)	SS-Green Light Racing	Chevrolet	1:24.701	104.514	–	–
24	74	Jordan Anderson	Mike Harmon Racing	Chevrolet	1:25.435	103.616	–	–
25	08	Korbin Forrister (R)	BJMM with SS-Green Light Racing	Chevrolet	1:27.035	101.711	–	–
26	45	B. J. McLeod	B. J. McLeod Motorsports	Chevrolet	1:27.275	101.431	–	–
27	36	Justin Jennings	MB Motorsports	Chevrolet	1:27.978	100.621	–	–
Qualified by owner's points
28	1	Travis Kvapil	MAKE Motorsports	Chevrolet	1:28.733	99.764	–	–
29	6	Norm Benning	Norm Benning Racing	Chevrolet	1:31.281	96.980	–	–
30	10	Jennifer Jo Cobb	Jennifer Jo Cobb Racing	Chevrolet	1:37.919	90.405	–	–
31	50	Ryan Ellis	MAKE Motorsports	Chevrolet	–	–		–
32	44	Josh Reaume (i)	Trophy Girl Racing	RAM	–	–	–	–
Official qualifying results
Official starting lineup

== Race results ==
Fin	St	#	Driver	Team	Make	Laps	Led	Status	Pts	Winnings
1	2	4	Erik Jones (R)	Kyle Busch Motorsports	Toyota	64	19	Running	47	$64,245
2	3	88	Matt Crafton	ThorSport Racing	Toyota	64	1	Running	43	$48,243
3	6	11	Ben Kennedy	Red Horse Racing	Toyota	64	0	Running	41	$35,572
4	13	14	Daniel Hemric (R)	NTS Motorsports	Chevrolet	64	0	Running	40	$27,034
5	1	29	Alex Tagliani (i)	Brad Keselowski Racing	Ford	64	8	Running	0	$26,832
6	9	98	Johnny Sauter	ThorSport Racing	Toyota	64	0	Running	38	$21,752
7	7	13	Cameron Hayley (R)	ThorSport Racing	Toyota	64	13	Running	38	$21,202
8	14	23	Spencer Gallagher (R)	GMS Racing	Chevrolet	64	0	Running	36	$20,651
9	12	8	John Hunter Nemechek (R)	SWM-NEMCO Motorsports	Chevrolet	64	0	Running	35	$19,661
10	5	00	Cole Custer	JR Motorsports	Chevrolet	64	22	Running	36	$20,500
11	8	54	Gray Gaulding	Kyle Busch Motorsports	Toyota	64	0	Running	33	$19,441
12	19	25	Brian Wong	Venturini Motorsports	Toyota	64	0	Running	32	$16,997
13	18	94	T. J. Bell (i)	Premium Motorsports	Chevrolet	64	1	Running	0	$19,137
14	17	15	Mason Mingus	Billy Boat Motorsports	Chevrolet	64	0	Running	30	$19,027
15	22	07	Ray Black Jr. (R)	SS-Green Light Racing	Chevrolet	64	0	Running	29	$19,406
16	23	74	Jordan Anderson	Mike Harmon Racing	Chevrolet	64	0	Running	28	$18,697
17	16	02	Tyler Young	Young's Motorsports	Chevrolet	64	0	Running	27	$18,586
18	24	08	Korbin Forrister (R)	BJMM with SS-Green Light Racing	Chevrolet	64	0	Running	26	$18,476
19	4	19	Tyler Reddick	Brad Keselowski Racing	Ford	62	0	Running	25	$18,367
20	29	10	Jennifer Jo Cobb	Jennifer Jo Cobb Racing	Chevrolet	61	0	Running	24	$17,506
21	28	6	Norm Benning	Norm Benning Racing	Chevrolet	59	0	Running	23	$16,896
22	10	17	Timothy Peters	Red Horse Racing	Toyota	57	0	Running	22	$15,787
23	15	51	Matt Tifft	Kyle Busch Motorsports	Toyota	56	0	Running	21	$15,566
24	27	1	Travis Kvapil	MAKE Motorsports	Chevrolet	55	0	Running	20	$15,455
25	20	05	John Wes Townley	Athenian Motorsports	Chevrolet	54	0	Running	19	$15,551
26	11	33	Brandon Jones (R)	GMS Racing	Chevrolet	43	0	Accident	18	$15,346
27	21	63	Daniel Brown	MB Motorsports	Chevrolet	42	0	Running	17	$15,291
28	25	45	B. J. McLeod	B. J. McLeod Motorsports	Chevrolet	21	0	Brakes	16	$15,013
29	26	36	Justin Jennings	MB Motorsports	Chevrolet	12	0	Brakes	15	$14,958
30	31	44	Josh Reaume (i)	Trophy Girl Racing	RAM	10	0	Engine	0	$14,458
31	30	50	Ryan Ellis	MAKE Motorsports	Chevrolet	0	0	Engine	13	$12,958
Withdrew
		53	Robert Mitten	NDS Motorsports	Chevrolet					
Official race results

== Standings after the race ==
Drivers' Championship standings

	Pos	Driver	Points
2	1	Erik Jones	590
	2	Matt Crafton	587 (-3)
2	3	Tyler Reddick	575 (–15)
	4	Johnny Sauter	535 (–55)
	5	Daniel Hemric	500 (–90)
	6	Cameron Hayley	489 (–101)
	7	Timothy Peters	470 (–120)
	8	John Wes Townley	466 (–124)
	9	Spencer Gallagher	452 (–138)
	10	Ben Kennedy	451 (–139)
Official driver's standings

- Note: Only the first 10 positions are included for the driver standings.

Previous race: 2015 UNOH 200	NASCAR Camping World Truck Series; 2015 season	Next race: 2015 American Ethanol E15 225
