= David Levine (racing driver) =

American racing driver

- Levine at the Illinois State Fairgrounds in 2015
- Born: David A. Levine; July 3, 1993 (age 33); Highland Park, Illinois, U.S.

NASCAR FedEx Freight Truck Series career
- 1 race run over 1 year
- 2016 position: 119th
- Best finish: 64th (2015)
- First race: 2015 Ford EcoBoost 200 (Homestead)
Wins	Top tens	Poles
0	0	0
- Statistics up to date as of November 20, 2015.

David Levine (born July 3, 1993) is an American professional stock car racing driver. He has driven in the NASCAR Camping World Truck Series, NASCAR K&N Pro Series East and ARCA Racing Series.

== Early career and education ==
Levine became interested in racing as a ten-year-old when he and his father went to an indoor carting track. Levine attended grade school through the eighth grade at Lake Forest Country Day School, a coeducational, independent preK-8 school located in Lake Forest, Illinois. He is a 2011 graduate of Lake Forest Academy, a prestigious college preparatory boarding school located on the North Shore in Lake Forest, Illinois. After Lake Forest Academy, Levine earned his Bachelor of Arts degree in Communications Studies from Furman University in Greenville, SC in May 2015. Levine initially learned his road racing driving skills at the Skip Barber Racing School.

== NASCAR ==
=== Camping World Truck Series ===
==== 2015 ====
It was announced in October 2015 that Levine would attempt to make his NASCAR Camping World Truck Series racing debut in the season-ending Ford EcoBoost 200 at Homestead-Miami Speedway on November 20, driving for Lira Motorsports. Levine finished the race in the 17th position.

==== 2016 ====
On February 15, it was announced that Levine joined MAKE Motorsports to race at the season opener at Daytona. He was one of 11 drivers who failed to qualify for the field.

=== K&N Pro Series East ===
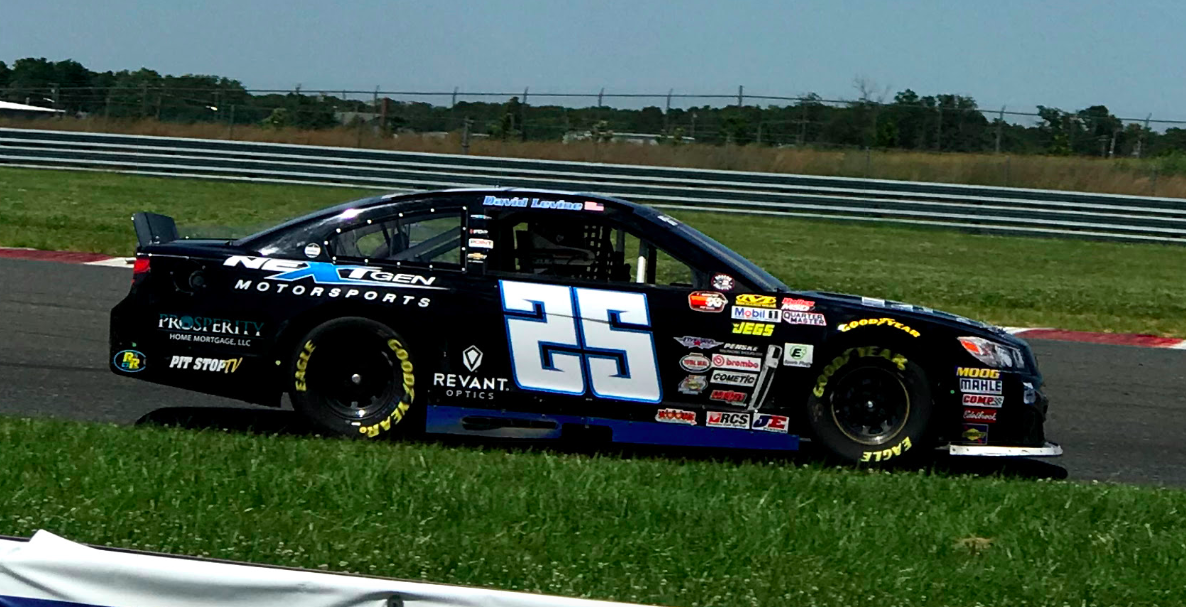
Levine on track at New Jersey Motorsports Park in 2018

Levine drove in the NASCAR K&N Pro Series East races at New Jersey Motorsports Park in 2017 and 2018.

== ARCA Racing Series ==
=== 2012 ===
Levine's ARCA Racing Series debut was at Chicagoland Speedway on July 21, 2012. In a car sponsored by the Richard Petty Driving Experience, Levine started 13th and finished 12th.

=== 2013 ===
Levine competed in three ARCA Racing Series races in 2013. At Road America on June 22, he started tenth and finished ninth. At Chicagoland Speedway on July 21, he started 22nd and finished 14th. At New Jersey Motorsports Park on July 28, he started 13th and finished tenth.

=== 2015 ===
Levine's no. 59 car at Kentucky Speedway in 2015

It was announced in December 2014 that Levine would race full-time in the ARCA Racing Series for Lira Motorsports. He raced the team's No. 59 car in 2015. Through the first 17 races of 2015, Levine had started in the top-ten four times, and finished in the top-ten nine times. His best finish was sixth place at both Fairgrounds Speedway Nashville on April 11 and Pocono Raceway on August 1. His primary sponsors with Lira Motorsports are Momo, TraqGear, Ford Performance and Roush Performance. In the final three races of 2015, Levine finished 15th at Salem Speedway, third at Kentucky Speedway and eighth at Kansas Speedway. His third place at Kentucky Speedway is his career best ARCA Series finish to date. Levine finished 2015 with a total of 11 top-ten finishes.

=== 2016 ===
Levine competed in one ARCA Racing Series event in 2016, the Twilight 150 presented by Unique Pretzels at the New Jersey Motorsports Park. Driving for the Mason Mitchell Motorsports team in the No. 98 car sponsored by Revant Optics, he qualified in the third starting position and finished the race in fifth place.

== IMSA Continental Tire Sports Car Challenge ==
=== 2012 ===
Racing the No. 81 for Bimmer World Racing in a BMW 328i, Levine finished sixth in the IMSA Continental Tire SportsCar Challenge ST Division national driver points standings. He had five top-ten finishes in nine races, including one win at Barber Motorsports Park.

=== 2013 ===
Racing the No. 78 Racers Edge Motorsports Mustang Boss 302R in the Grand Sport Division, Levine had two top-ten finishes in ten races. His best finish was eighth at Kansas Speedway. He finished 21st in IMSA Continental Tire SportsCar Challenge GS Division national driver points standings.

=== 2014 ===
Racing the No. 78 Racers Edge Ford Mustang, Levine finished 12th in the national IMSA Continental Tire SportsCar Challenge driver points standings in the Grand Sport Division. He had a total of six top-ten finishes in 12 races, with a best finish of fifth at both Sebring and Road Atlanta.

=== 2015 ===
Levine competed in one International Motor Sports Association (IMSA) Continental Tire SportsCar Challenge Series race in 2015, the October 2 two-and-a-half hour event at Road Atlanta. Along with co-driver Michael Lira, Levine finished the race in tenth place.

== Skip Barber Racing School ==
Prior to racing in the IMSA Continental Tire Series, Levine learned road racing driving skills at the Skip Barber Racing School. While there, he drove many types of cars, including stock cars and Midgets. While at Skip Barber, he also raced in the MAZDASPEED Challenge Series, logging four wins.

== American Heart Association ==
Levine was born with a heart defect that required open-heart surgery at four months old. As a racing driver, he routinely visits children's hospitals to cheer up young patients on behalf of the American Heart Association. He also has his own, personal American Heart Association campaign, called DriveForHeart, which serves to raise awareness about congenital heart defects and let racing fans know how important living a healthy lifestyle is at any age.

== Motorsports career results ==
=== NASCAR ===
(key) (Bold – Pole position awarded by qualifying time. Italics – Pole position earned by points standings or practice time. * – Most laps led.)

==== Camping World Truck Series ====
NASCAR Camping World Truck Series results
Year	Team	No.	Make	1	2	3	4	5	6	7	8	9	10	11	12	13	14	15	16	17	18	19	20	21	22	23	NCWTC	Pts	Ref
2015	Lira Motorsports	59	Ford	DAY	ATL	MAR	KAN	CLT	DOV	TEX	GTW	IOW	KEN	ELD	POC	MCH	BRI	MSP	CHI	NHA	LVS	TAL	MAR	TEX	PHO	HOM; 17	64th	27	
2016	MAKE Motorsports	1	Chevy	DAY; DNQ	ATL	MAR	KAN	DOV	CLT	TEX	IOW	GTW	KEN	ELD	POC	BRI	MCH	MSP	CHI	NHA	LVS	TAL	MAR	TEX	PHO	HOM	119th	0	

==== K&N Pro Series East ====
NASCAR K&N Pro Series East results
Year	Team	No.	Make	1	2	3	4	5	6	7	8	9	10	11	12	13	14	NKNPSEC	Pts	Ref
2017	NextGen Motorsports	25	Chevy	NSM	GRE	BRI	SBO	SBO	MEM	BLN	TMP	NHA	IOW	GLN	LGY	NJM; 14	DOV	61st	30	
2018	NextGen Motorsports	25	Chevy	NSM	BRI	LGY	SBO	SBO	MEM	NJE	TMP	NJM; 12	IOW	GLN	GTW	NHA	DOV	48th	32	

=== ARCA Racing Series ===
(key) (Bold – Pole position awarded by qualifying time. Italics – Pole position earned by points standings or practice time. * – Most laps led.)

ARCA Racing Series results
Year	Team	No.	Make	1	2	3	4	5	6	7	8	9	10	11	12	13	14	15	16	17	18	19	20	21	ARSC	Pts	Ref
2012	Richard Petty Driving Experience	45	Dodge	DAY	MOB	SLM	TAL	TOL	ELK	POC	MCH	WIN	NJE	IOW	CHI; 12	IRP	POC	BLN	ISF	MAD	SLM	DSF	KAN		110th	145	
2013	Richard Petty Driving Experience	43	Dodge	DAY	MOB	SLM	TAL	TOL	ELK	POC	MCH	ROA; 9	WIN	CHI; 14	NJE; 13	POC	BLN	ISF	MAD	DSF	IOW	SLM	KEN	KAN	53rd	510	
2015	Kimmel Racing	68	Ford	DAY; 16																					5th	4515	
2015	Lira Motorsports	59	Ford		MOB; 12	NSH; 6	SLM; 9	TAL; 11	TOL; 9	NJE; 18	POC; 8	MCH; 7	CHI; 9	WIN; 16	IOW; 10	IRP; 22	POC; 6	BLN; 13	ISF; 7	DSF; 12	SLM; 15	KEN; 3	KAN; 8		5th	4515	
2016	Mason Mitchell Motorsports	98	Ford	DAY	NSH	SLM	TAL	TOL	NJE; 5	POC	MCH	MAD	WIN	IOW	IRP	POC	BLN	ISF	DSF	SLM	CHI	KEN	KAN		91st	205	
