= Robert Mitten (racing driver) =

American racing driver

- Born: October 6, 1963 (age 63); Plantation, Florida, U.S.

NASCAR FedEx Freight Truck Series career
- 1 race run over 1 year
- Best finish: N/A (2015)
- First race: 2015 Chevrolet Silverado 250 (Bowmanville)
Wins	Top tens	Poles
0	0	0

ARCA Menards Series career
- 4 races run over 4 years
- Best finish: 88th (2010)
- First race: 2010 Garden State 150 (Millville)
- Last race: 2015 ARCA 150 (Millville)
Wins	Top tens	Poles
0	1	0
- Statistics up to date as of January 28, 2025.

Robert Mitten (born October 6, 1963) is an American former professional auto racing driver who has previously competed in the NASCAR Camping World Truck Series and the ARCA Racing Series.

Mitten has also competed in the NASCAR K&N Pro Series East and the Michelin Pilot Challenge.

== Motorsports results ==
=== NASCAR ===
(key) (Bold - Pole position awarded by qualifying time. Italics - Pole position earned by points standings or practice time. * – Most laps led.)

==== Camping World Truck Series ====
NASCAR Camping World Truck Series results
Year	Team	No.	Make	1	2	3	4	5	6	7	8	9	10	11	12	13	14	15	16	17	18	19	20	21	22	23	NCWTC	Pts	Ref
2015	NDS Motorsports	53	RAM	DAY	ATL	MAR	KAN	CLT	DOV	TEX	GTW	IOW	KEN	ELD	POC	MCH	BRI	MSP; 32	CHI	NHA	LVS	TAL	MAR	TEX	PHO	HOM	NA	-	

=== ARCA Racing Series ===
(key) (Bold – Pole position awarded by qualifying time. Italics – Pole position earned by points standings or practice time. * – Most laps led.)

ARCA Racing Series results
Year	Team	No.	Make	1	2	3	4	5	6	7	8	9	10	11	12	13	14	15	16	17	18	19	20	21	ARSC	Pts	Ref
2010	Empire Racing	82	Chevy	DAY	PBE	SLM	TEX	TAL	TOL	POC	MCH	IOW	MFD	POC	BLN	NJE; 7	ISF	CHI	DSF	TOL	SLM	KAN	CAR		88th	195	
2012	Venturini Motorsports	35	Chevy	DAY	MOB	SLM	TAL	TOL	ELK	POC	MCH	WIN	NJE; 28	IOW	CHI	IRP	POC	BLN	ISF	MAD	SLM	DSF	KAN		133rd	90	
2013	Universe Racing	86	Chevy	DAY	MOB	SLM	TAL	TOL	ELK	POC	MCH	ROA	WIN	CHI	NJM; 19	POC	BLN	ISF	MAD	DSF	IOW	SLM	KEN	KAN	123rd	135	
2015	NDS Motorsports	53	Dodge	DAY	MOB	NSH	SLM	TAL	TOL	NJE; 25	POC	MCH	CHI	WIN	IOW	IRP	POC	BLN	ISF	DSF	SLM	KEN	KAN		124th	105	
