= Jody Knowles =

American racing driver

- Born: March 3, 1986 (age 40); Tyrone, Georgia, U.S.

NASCAR FedEx Freight Truck Series career
- 5 races run over 2 years
- 2015 position: 65th
- Best finish: 49th (2014)
- First race: 2014 Mudsummer Classic (Eldora)
- Last race: 2015 Mudsummer Classic (Eldora)
Wins	Top tens	Poles
0	0	0

Jody Knowles (born March 3, 1986) is an American professional stock car racing driver. A late model racer, he has competed in the NASCAR Camping World Truck Series.

== Racing career ==
Knowles started in quarter midget racing at five years of age, and began dirt track racing on a permanent basis when he was 13 years old.

In 2014, Knowles competed in the NASCAR Camping World Truck Series' Mudsummer Classic at Eldora Speedway. He ran in the top 15 for much of the final race before suffering a pass-through penalty for being out of position on a restart. He was also involved in a late spin that brought out a caution, and would finish 28th.

== Personal life ==
His father Jerry formerly competed in the NASCAR Sportsman Division. Cousin Tony is also a Super Late Model racer.

== Motorsports career results ==
=== NASCAR ===
(key) (Bold – Pole position awarded by qualifying time. Italics – Pole position earned by points standings or practice time. * – Most laps led.)

==== Camping World Truck Series ====
NASCAR Camping World Truck Series results
Year	Team	No.	Make	1	2	3	4	5	6	7	8	9	10	11	12	13	14	15	16	17	18	19	20	21	22	23	NCWTC	Pts	Ref
2014	Frank Ingram Racing	80	Ford	DAY	MAR	KAN	CLT	DOV	TEX	GTW	KEN	IOW	ELD; 28	POC	MCH	BRI; 31	MSP	CHI	NHA	LVS	TAL	MAR; 34	TEX	PHO; 22	HOM		49th	61	
2015	Jacob Wallace Racing	50	Ford	DAY	ATL	MAR	KAN	CLT	DOV	TEX	GTW	IOW	KEN	ELD; 18	POC	MCH	BRI	MSP	CHI	NHA	LVS	TAL	MAR	TEX	PHO	HOM	65th	26	
