= Stew Hayward =

Canadian racing driver

- Born: November 27, 1973 (age 52); Calgary, Alberta

NASCAR FedEx Freight Truck Series career
- 1 race run over 1 year
- 2015 position: 79th
- Best finish: 79th (2015)
- First race: 2015 Mudsummer Classic (Eldora)
| Wins | Top tens | Poles |
|---|---|---|
| 0 | 0 | 0 |

Stewart Hayward (born November 27, 1973) is a Canadian professional dirt track racing driver. In 2015, he competed in the NASCAR Camping World Truck Series, driving the No. 74 Ram for Mike Harmon Racing.

== Racing career ==
During the 2000s, Hayward competed in kart racing. In 2009, he began racing in the WISSOTA Alberta Late Models.

In 2015, Hayward made his NASCAR Camping World Truck Series debut at Eldora Speedway, driving the No. 74 for Mike Harmon Racing; the truck was the lone Ram Trucks entrant in the race, though it used decals from a Chevrolet Impala. He started 31st and finished 32nd after an engine failure.

== Motorsports career results ==
=== NASCAR ===
(key) (Bold – Pole position awarded by qualifying time. Italics – Pole position earned by points standings or practice time. * – Most laps led.)

==== Camping World Truck Series ====
NASCAR Camping World Truck Series results
| Year | Team | No. | Make | 1 | 2 | 3 | 4 | 5 | 6 | 7 | 8 | 9 | 10 | 11 | 12 | 13 | 14 | 15 | 16 | 17 | 18 | 19 | 20 | 21 | 22 | 23 | NCWTC | Pts | Ref |
|---|---|---|---|---|---|---|---|---|---|---|---|---|---|---|---|---|---|---|---|---|---|---|---|---|---|---|---|---|---|
| 2015 | Mike Harmon Racing | 74 | Ram | DAY | ATL | MAR | KAN | CLT | DOV | TEX | GTW | IOW | KEN | ELD; 32 | POC | MCH | BRI | MSP | CHI | NHA | LVS | TAL | MAR | TEX | PHO | HOM | 79th | 12 | |
