= Bobby Pierce (racing driver) =

American racing driver (born 1996)

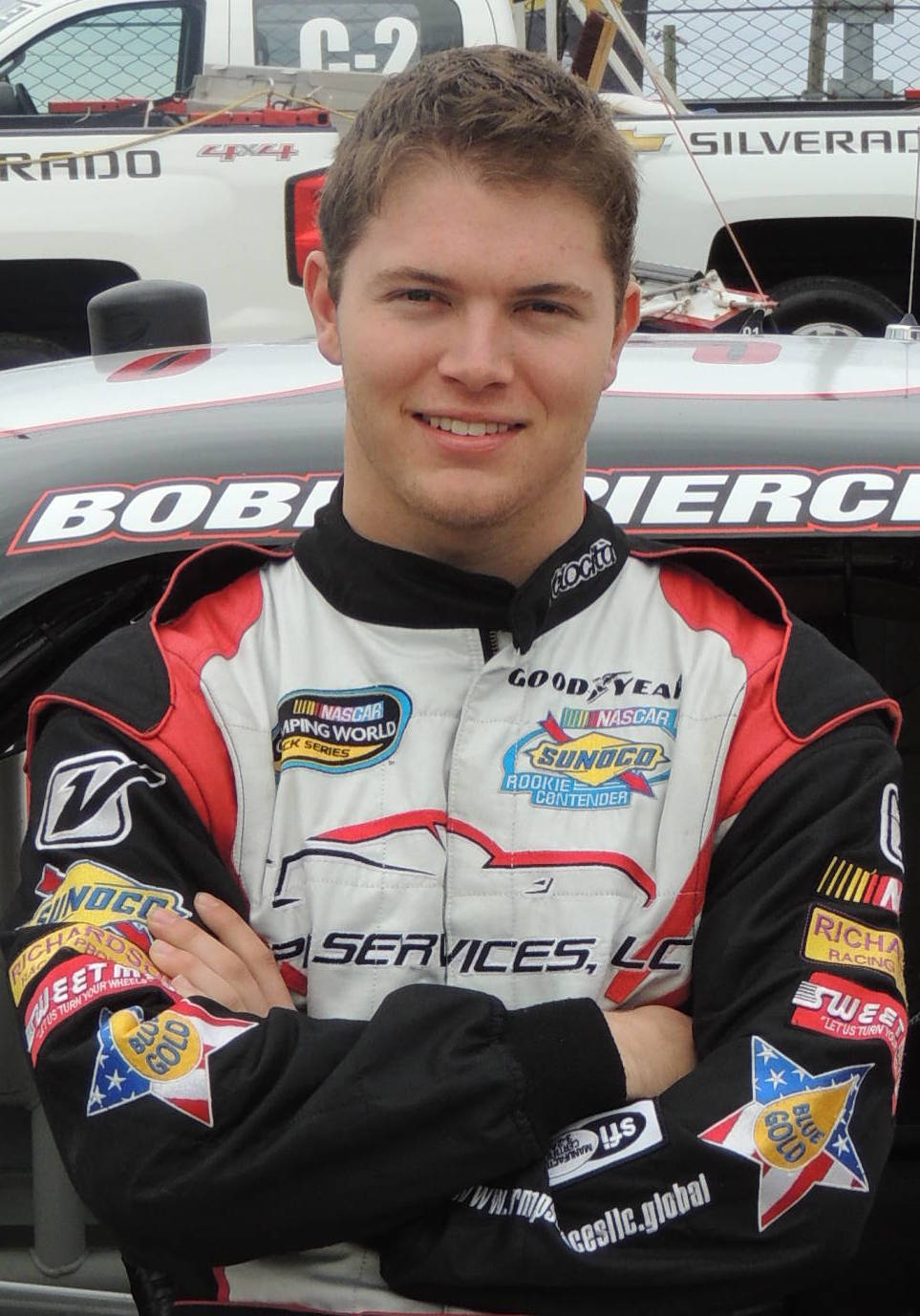
- Pierce at Martinsville Speedway in 2015
- Born: November 24, 1996 (age 29) Oakwood, Illinois, U.S.

Late model career
- Debut season: 2009
- Current team: No. 32 (Bobby Pierce Racing)
- Wins: 380+

Championship titles
- 2023, 2025, 2026 World of Outlaws Late Model Series Champion; 2014, 2015, 2016 UMP DIRTcar Late Model National Champion; 2015, 2016, 2017, 2021, 2022 UMP DIRTcar Summer Nationals Hell Tour Champion
- Achievements: 2026 Eldora Dream; 2026, 2024, 2023 USA Nationals; 2024 Prairie Dirt Classic; 2025, 2018, 2017 Gateway Dirt Nationals; 2025, 2024, 2023, 2016 North-South 100; 2024, 2016 World 100; 2020, 2019, 2016, 2014 Slocum 50; 2019 Silver Dollar Nationals

NASCAR FedEx Freight Truck Series career
- 8 races run over 3 years
- 2017 position: 53rd
- Best finish: 39th (2015)
- First race: 2015 Mudsummer Classic (Eldora)
- Last race: 2017 Eldora Dirt Derby (Eldora)
Wins	Top tens	Poles
0	2	1
- Statistics up to date as of October 5, 2026.

Bobby Pierce (born November 24, 1996) is an American professional dirt late model and stock car racing driver. Pierce won the World of Outlaws Late Model Series championship in 2023 and 2025.

== Racing career ==
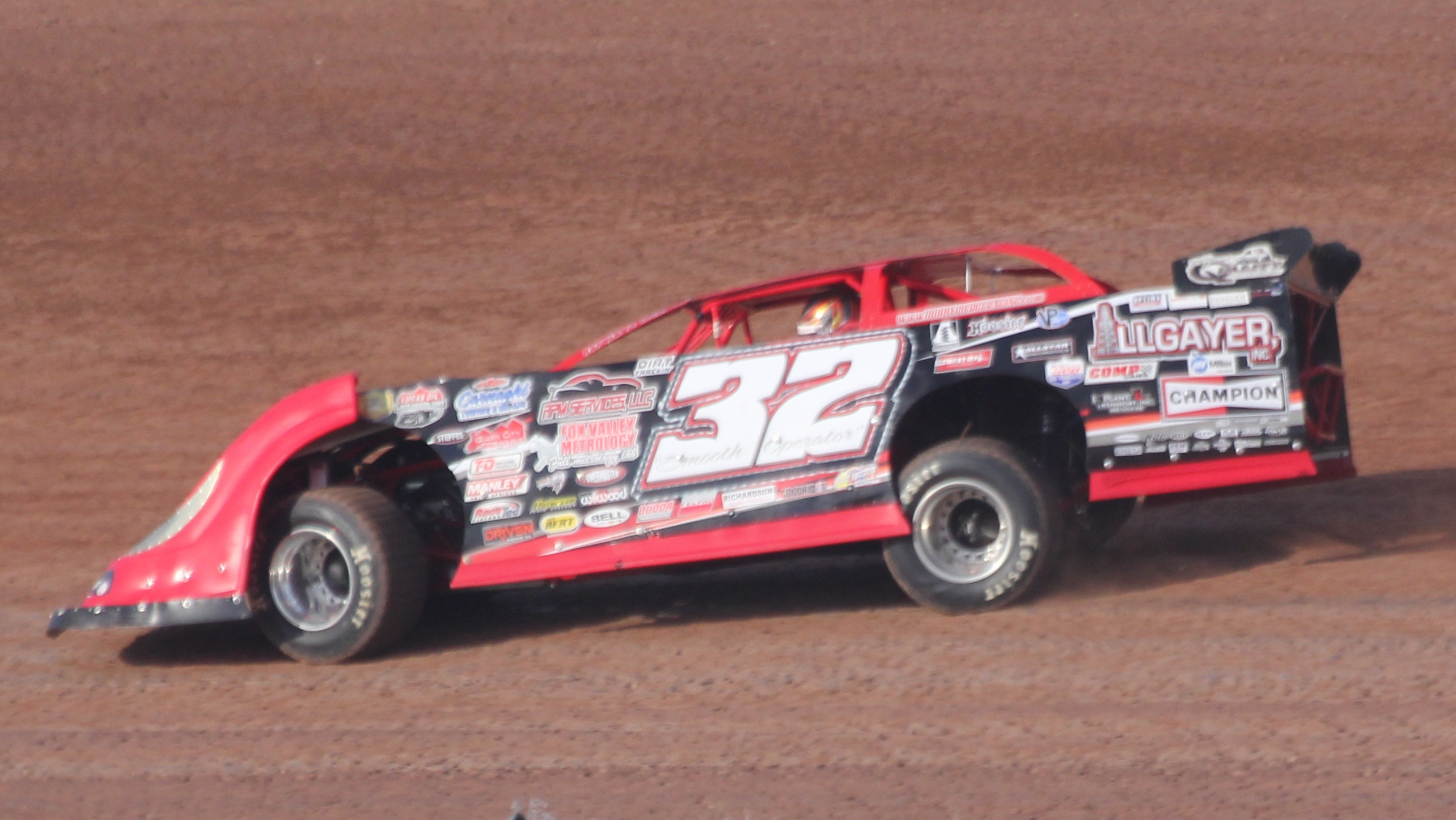
Pierce's dirt late model in 2015

=== Late models ===
Pierce began racing quarter midgets as an eight-year-old. and five years later was in the headlines in 2009 when he won his first crate late model feature.

Pierce finished second in the 2013 UMP Summer Nationals "Hell Tour". He followed it up by winning the 2014 UMP DIRTcar Late Model national champion. He won the points championship for the 2015 Summer Nationals "Hell Tour" in June / July, and repeated as UMP DIRTcar Late Model national champion for the 2015 season.

In 2021 Pierce claimed his first World of Outlaws Late Model Series victory, and two years later was crowned the series champion. In 2025, Pierce repeated his World of Outlaws success.

=== NASCAR national series ===
Pierce made his first NASCAR start on the dirt for the Mudsummer Classic at Eldora Speedway on July 22, 2015 where he was the fastest qualifier. He won the first heat race and sat on the pole position for the feature in an MB Motorsports truck. He battled for the lead during most of the race and ended up finishing second to fellow dirt ringer Christopher Bell.

Pierce's success prompted Dale Earnhardt Jr. to sign him to JR Motorsports on August 5, 2015 for his asphalt Late Model debut at Hickory Motor Speedway in a Whelen All-American Series race at the circuit. Pierce made his second NASCAR start at Martinsville Speedway, his first experience on a non-dirt track, driving the No. 63 for MB Motorsports.

== Family ==
Pierce is the son of Bob Pierce, whose late model career in the 1980s and 1990s earned him membership in the National Dirt Late Model Hall of Fame.

== Motorsports career results ==
=== NASCAR ===
(key) (Bold – Pole position awarded by qualifying time. Italics – Pole position earned by points standings or practice time. * – Most laps led.)

==== Camping World Truck Series ====
NASCAR Camping World Truck Series results
Year	Team	No.	Make	1	2	3	4	5	6	7	8	9	10	11	12	13	14	15	16	17	18	19	20	21	22	23	NCWTC	Pts	Ref
2015	MB Motorsports	63	Chevy	DAY	ATL	MAR	KAN	CLT	DOV	TEX	GTW	IOW	KEN	**ELD**; 2	POC	MCH	BRI	MSP	CHI	NHA	LVS	TAL	MAR; 22	TEX			39th	93	
2015	MB Motorsports	36	Chevy																						PHO; 16	HOM; DNQ	39th	93	
2016	MB Motorsports	63	Chevy	DAY	ATL	MAR	KAN; 23	DOV; 26	CLT; 27	TEX	IOW	GTW	KEN	ELD; 25*	POC	BRI	MCH	MSP	CHI	NHA	LVS	TAL	MAR	TEX	PHO	HOM	41st	33	
2017	MB Motorsports	63	Chevy	DAY	ATL	MAR	KAN	CLT	DOV	TEX	GTW	IOW	KEN	ELD; 6	POC	MCH	BRI	MSP	CHI	NHA	LVS	TAL	MAR	TEX	PHO	HOM	53rd	31	

^{*} Season still in progress
^{1} Ineligible for series points
