= John Wes Townley =

American racing driver (1989–2021)

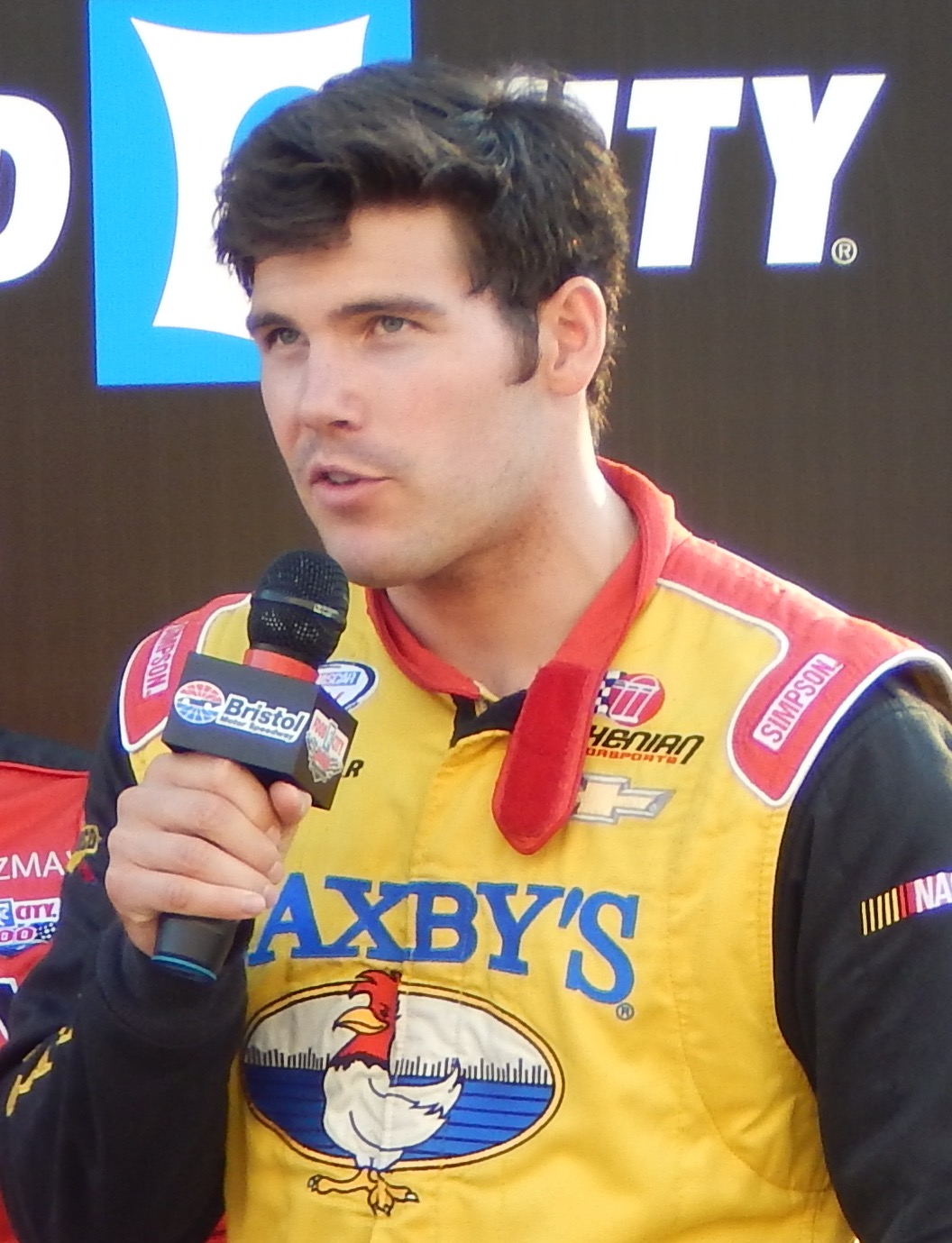
- Townley at Bristol Motor Speedway in 2015
- Born: John Wesley Townley; December 31, 1989; Watkinsville, Georgia, U.S.
- Died: October 2, 2021 (aged 31); Athens, Georgia, U.S.

NASCAR O'Reilly Auto Parts Series career
- 76 races run over 8 years
- 2016 position: 111th
- Best finish: 23rd (2009)
- First race: 2008 Camping World RV Sales 200 (Dover)
- Last race: 2016 Sparks Energy 300 (Talladega)
Wins	Top tens	Poles
0	0	0

NASCAR FedEx Freight Truck Series career
- 110 races run over 6 years
- 2016 position: 17th
- Best finish: 8th (2015)
- First race: 2008 Ohio 250 (Mansfield)
- Last race: 2016 Texas Roadhouse 200 (Martinsville)
- First win: 2015 Rhino Linings 350 (Las Vegas)
Wins	Top tens	Poles
1	24	2
- Statistics up to date as of October 3, 2021.

John Wesley Townley (December 31, 1989 – October 2, 2021) was an American professional stock car racing driver. He competed in NASCAR's Xfinity and Truck Series from 2008 to 2016, winning a race in the latter in 2015.

Townley's father Tony is a co-founder of the Zaxby's chain of chicken restaurants.

== Racing career ==
=== Early career ===
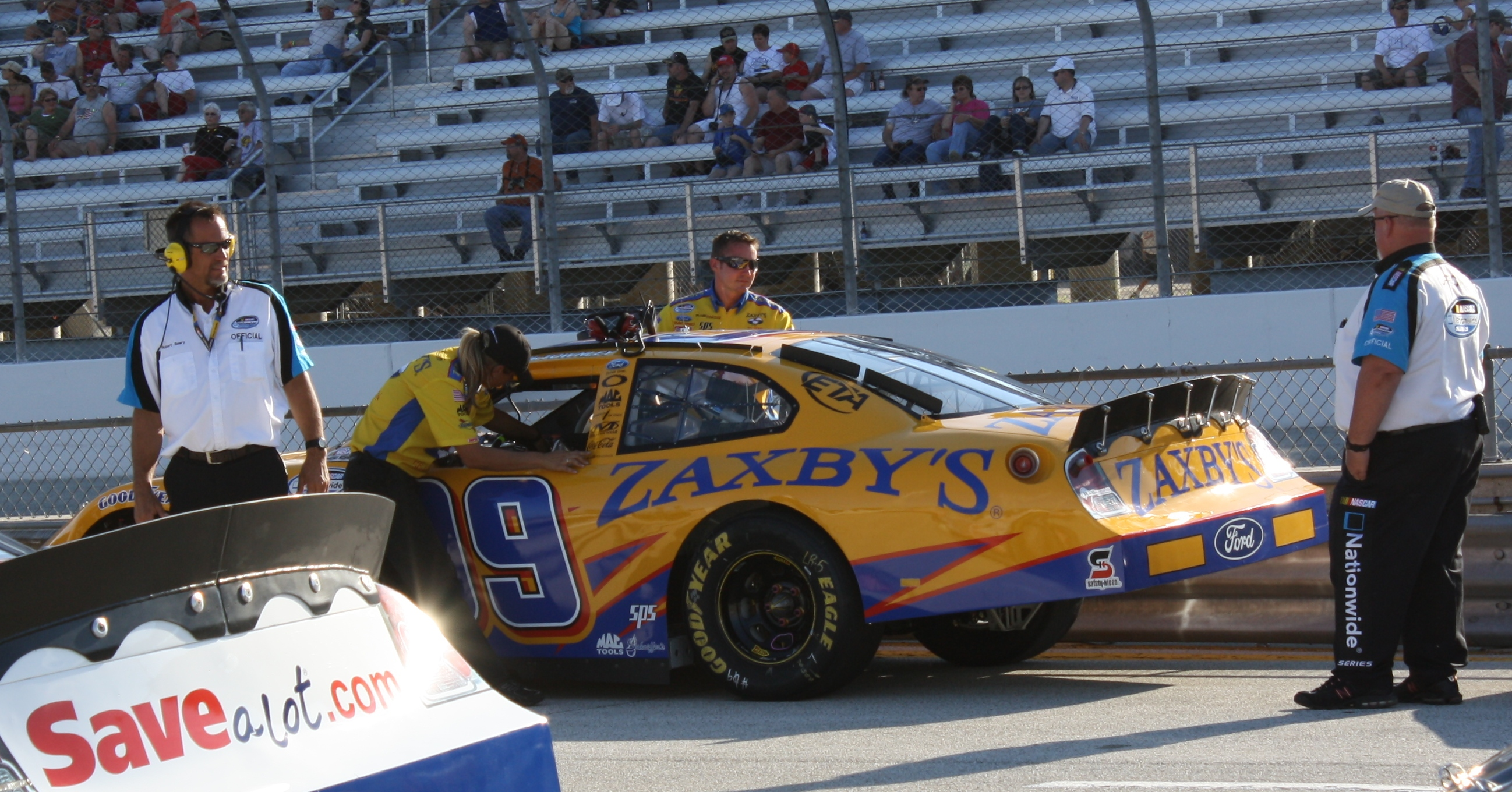
Townley's 2009 Nationwide Series car

A Jeff Gordon fan in his youth, Townley began racing in karts in Georgia and the Carolinas. Prior to entering NASCAR, he drove in the American Speed Association. He began racing in the Nationwide Series in 2008 when he drove in three races for RAB Racing and had three DNFs. He also competed in seven Craftsman Truck Series for Roush Racing with a best finish of 18th at both The Milwaukee Mile and Talladega Superspeedway. He returned to the Nationwide Series with RAB in 2009 and qualified for 26 races. He finished 16 races and finished 23rd in points. Townley's driving style proved controversial, resulting in numerous accidents; he received the nickname "John Wrecks Weekly" from fans.

Townley joined Richard Childress Racing for 2010, but was released before the sixth race of the year at Phoenix International Raceway. It resulted in his replacement for that race by Clint Bowyer, and for the rest of the year by Bowyer and Morgan Shepherd. He rejoined RAB Racing for a few races later in the 2010 season.

=== 2012–2017 ===
Townley returned to RAB Racing for the 2012 NASCAR Camping World Truck Series season, competing for Rookie of the Year honors.

On February 7, 2012, Townley was arrested and charged with DUI following an automobile accident in suburban Oconee County, Georgia. He was subsequently suspended by RAB Racing until an "appropriate" amount of time had passed, and was placed on probation by NASCAR through the end of the year. Townley would return to driving for the team in the Camping World Truck Series at the end of March at Martinsville Speedway, where he finished 23rd. He would finish in the top-20 in the following three races, and would return to the Nationwide Series in RAB's No. 99 Toyota at Dover International Speedway and Daytona International Speedway during the summer.

In August, Townley attempted to make his Sprint Cup Series debut at Pocono Raceway, driving for FAS Lane Racing with sponsorship from Zaxby's. Townley hit the wall on his warm-up lap of practice out of the tunnel turn and was replaced by Jason White. On the same weekend he scored his first career top-ten finish in NASCAR, finishing eighth in the Camping World Truck Series race at Pocono.

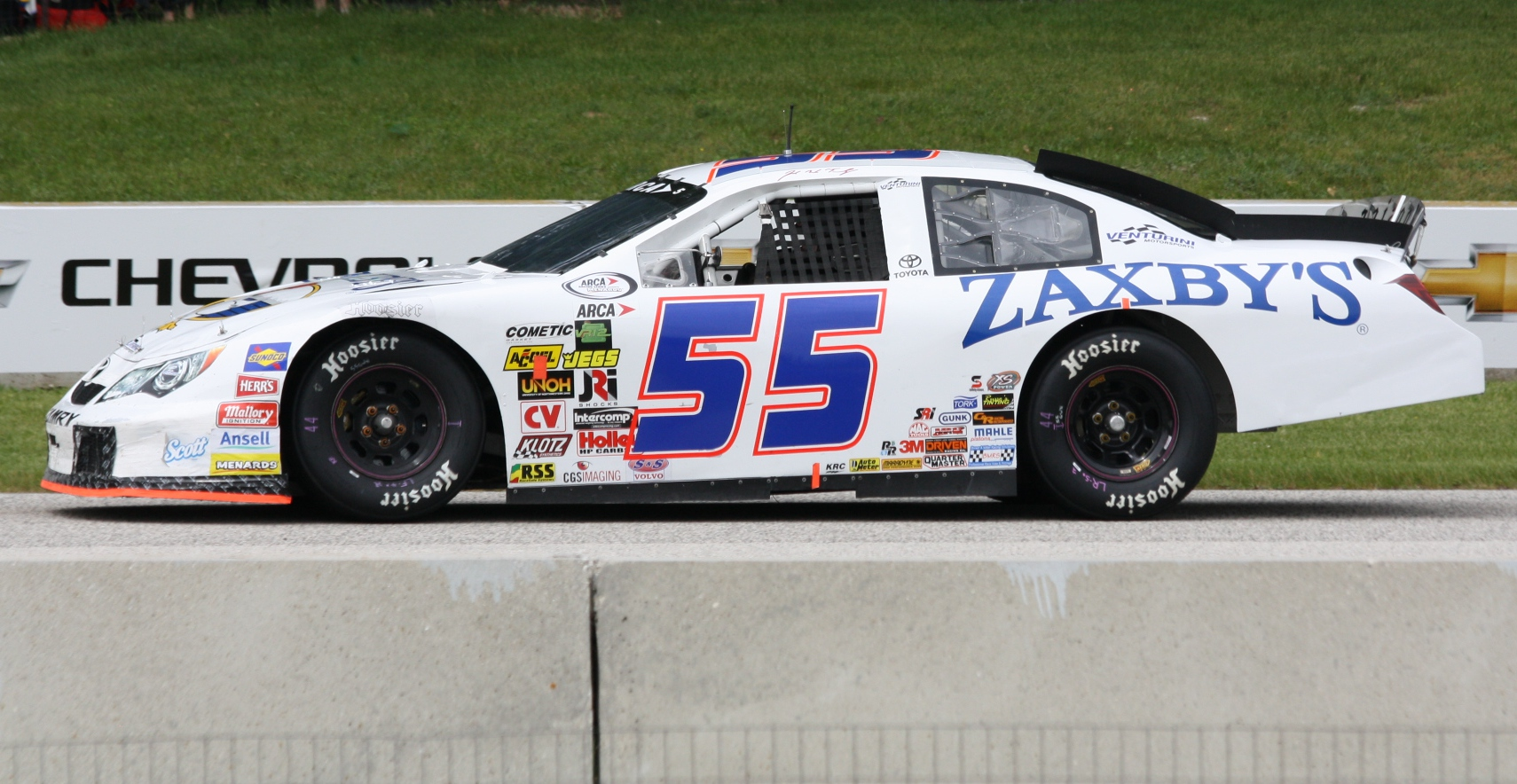
Townley's 2013 ARCA car at Road America

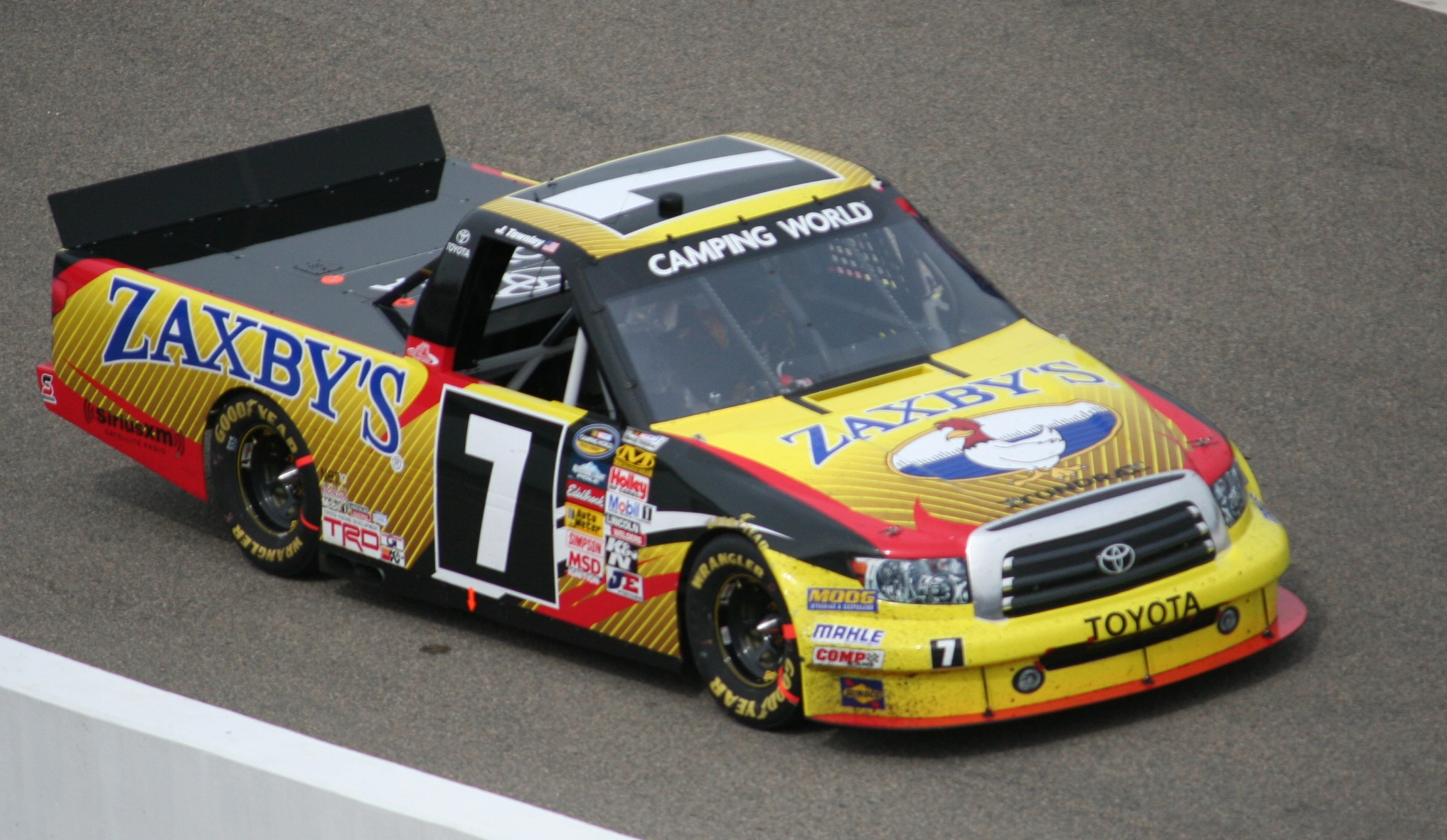
Townley's 2013 truck at Rockingham Speedway

After the 2012 season, Townley signed with Red Horse Racing to drive the team's No. 7 Toyota in the Camping World Truck Series for 2013. In addition, Townley drove for Venturini Motorsports in the season-opening race for the ARCA Racing Series at Daytona International Speedway. Starting from the pole, he went on to win the event, running a partial schedule in ARCA and the NASCAR Nationwide Series for the team. Townley finished 11th in Truck points.

For the 2014 season, Townley moved to Wauters Motorsports to drive the No. 5 Toyota in the Camping World Truck Series, as well as running full-time in the ARCA Racing Series for Venturini Motorsports. Mid-season, Townley moved to Athenian Motorsports, which is owned by his father Tony Townley, for the remainder of the Truck Series season as well as a partial Nationwide Series schedule.

At Pocono Raceway in August, Townley was involved in an accident during ARCA qualifying and was forced to sit out the remainder of the weekend as a precaution. In December, it was announced that Townley would return to the Truck Series full-time in the No. 05 for Athenian Motorsports while also running part-time in the Xfinity Series in the No. 25 for Athenian Motorsports.

In 2015, Townley won his first career truck race at Las Vegas Motor Speedway when Matt Crafton pitted for fuel with six laps to go. Townley stayed out on the gamble and won in the process.

During the 2016 Drivin' for Linemen 200 at Gateway Motorsports Park, Townley was involved in an altercation with Spencer Gallagher, after the two crashed on lap 154. Townley and Gallagher's fight began trending worldwide as it was called as one of the funniest fights in sports. Townley was eventually fined $15,000 and placed on probation until the end of the year. He missed the following race at Kentucky Speedway for concussion treatment and was replaced by Parker Kligerman. Townley also missed another race when he skipped the Texas Motor Speedway truck race to treat an injured left ankle, with Cody Coughlin taking over the No. 05 for the event.

In January 2017, it was announced Townley was retiring from motorsports and Athenian Motorsports would subsequently be shutting down operations.

== Personal life ==
A native of Watkinsville, Georgia, Townley was named after English clergyman John Wesley. He graduated from North Oconee High School in 2008 and later attended the University of North Georgia.

Townley was a recreational mountain biker and snowboarder, and also enjoyed playing the piano, banjo, and guitar. He announced his engagement to girlfriend Laura Bird in late 2016.

According to court documents, in 2019, Townley was charged with three misdemeanor counts, including family violence battery, after he reportedly threw his wife to the floor, causing her to have reasonable fear for her life. Townley pled guilty to disorderly conduct and was sentenced to 12 months probation. In February 2021, he filed for divorce, which was granted in September of that year.

== Death ==
On October 2, 2021, Townley, age 31, reportedly attacked his ex-wife Laura Townley and Zachary Anderson with a hatchet at her home in the Five Points area of Athens, Georgia. Anderson shot and killed Townley, and accidentally shot Laura, who sustained serious injuries. The investigation is ongoing and no charges have been filed.

== Motorsports career results ==
=== NASCAR ===
(key) (Bold – Pole position awarded by time. Italics – Pole position earned by points standings. * – Most laps led.)

==== Sprint Cup Series ====
NASCAR Sprint Cup Series results
Year	Team	No.	Make	1	2	3	4	5	6	7	8	9	10	11	12	13	14	15	16	17	18	19	20	21	22	23	24	25	26	27	28	29	30	31	32	33	34	35	36	NSCC	Pts	Ref
2012	FAS Lane Racing	32	Ford	DAY	PHO	LVS	BRI	CAL	MAR	TEX	KAN	RCH	TAL	DAR	CLT	DOV	POC	MCH	SON	KEN	DAY	NHA	IND	POC; Wth	GLN	MCH	BRI	ATL	RCH	CHI	NHA	DOV	TAL	CLT	KAN	MAR	TEX	PHO	HOM	NA	-	

==== Xfinity Series ====
NASCAR Xfinity Series results
Year	Team	No.	Make	1	2	3	4	5	6	7	8	9	10	11	12	13	14	15	16	17	18	19	20	21	22	23	24	25	26	27	28	29	30	31	32	33	34	35	NXSC	Pts	Ref
2008	RAB Racing	09	Ford	DAY	CAL	LVS	ATL	BRI	NSH	TEX	PHO	MXC	TAL	RCH	DAR	CLT	DOV	NSH	KEN	MLW	NHA	DAY	CHI	GTY	IRP	CGV	GLN	MCH	BRI; DNQ	CAL	RCH	DOV; 30	KAN	CLT; 27	MEM; DNQ	TEX; DNQ	PHO; 38	HOM; DNQ	92nd	204	
2009	RAB Racing	09	Ford	DAY; 21	CAL; 22	LVS; 38	BRI; 16	TEX; 36	NSH; 18	PHO; 36	TAL; 18	RCH; DNQ	DAR; 34	CLT; DNQ	DOV; 38	NSH; 42	KEN; 32	MLW; DNQ	NHA; 28	DAY; 36	CHI; 21	GTY; 21	IRP; DNQ	IOW; 29	GLN	MCH; DNQ	BRI; 33	CGV	ATL; DNQ	RCH	DOV; 18	KAN; 31	CAL; 17	CLT; 28	MEM; 40	TEX; 18	PHO; 23	HOM; 24	23rd	1989	
2010	Richard Childress Racing	21	Chevy	DAY; 23	CAL; 30	LVS; 15	BRI; 26	NSH; 18	PHO; Wth^{†}	TEX	TAL	RCH	DAR	DOV	CLT	NSH	KEN	ROA	NHA	DAY	CHI	GTY	IRP																47th	866	
2010	RAB Racing	09	Ford																					IOW; 24	GLN	MCH; 17	BRI; 27	CGV	ATL; 22	RCH	DOV	KAN	CAL	CLT	GTY	TEX	PHO	HOM	47th	866	
2012	RAB Racing	24	Toyota	DAY	PHO	LVS	BRI	CAL	TEX	RCH	TAL; 15	DAR	IOW	CLT																									126th	0^{1}	
2012	RAB Racing	99	Toyota												DOV; 20	MCH	ROA	KEN	DAY; 25	NHA	CHI	IND	IOW	GLN	CGV	BRI; 23	ATL	RCH	CHI	KEN	DOV	CLT; 32	KAN	TEX	PHO	HOM			126th	0^{1}	
2013	Venturini Motorsports	25	Toyota	DAY	PHO	LVS	BRI; 17	CAL	TEX	RCH	TAL; DNQ	DAR	CLT; 35	DOV	IOW	MCH	ROA	KEN	DAY	NHA	CHI	IND	IOW	GLN	MOH	BRI	ATL	RCH	CHI	KEN	DOV	KAN	CHA	TEX	PHO	HOM			114th	0^{1}	
2014	Athenian Motorsports	25	Toyota	DAY	PHO	LVS	BRI	CAL	TEX	DAR	RCH	TAL; 13	IOW	CLT; 22	DOV	MCH	ROA	KEN; Wth	DAY; 18	NHA	CHI; 27	IND; 28	IOW	GLN	MOH	BRI; 18	ATL; 32	RCH	CHI	KEN	DOV	KAN; 31	CLT	TEX; 23	PHO; 23	HOM; 33			100th^{1}	0^{1}	
2015	Athenian Motorsports	25	Chevy	DAY; 33	ATL; 27	LVS; 19	PHO	CAL; 23	TEX; 17	BRI; 14	RCH	TAL; 15	IOW; 13	CLT; 29	DOV; 15	MCH	CHI	DAY; 19	KEN; 32	NHA	IND	IOW	GLN; 39	MOH	BRI; 23	ROA	DAR; 26	RCH; 30	CHI; 13	KEN	DOV	CLT; 22	KAN	TEX	PHO	HOM			97th	0^{1}	
2016	Athenian Motorsports	05	Chevy	DAY; 17	ATL	LVS	PHO	CAL	TEX	BRI	RCH	TAL; 26	DOV	CLT	POC	MCH	IOW	DAY	KEN	NHA	IND	IOW	GLN	MOH	BRI	ROA	DAR	RCH	CHI	KEN	DOV	CLT	KAN	TEX	PHO	HOM			111th	0^{1}	
^{†} - Replaced by Clint Bowyer

==== Camping World Truck Series ====
NASCAR Camping World Truck Series results
Year	Team	No.	Make	1	2	3	4	5	6	7	8	9	10	11	12	13	14	15	16	17	18	19	20	21	22	23	24	25	NCWTC	Pts	Ref
2008	Roush Fenway Racing	09	Ford	DAY	CAL	ATL	MAR	KAN	CLT	MFD; 27	DOV	TEX	MCH	MLW; 18	MEM	KEN; 21	IRP	NSH; 30	BRI; 35	GTW	NHA	LVS	TAL; 18	MAR	ATL	TEX	PHO; 24	HOM	39th	622	
2009	Billy Ballew Motorsports	09	Toyota	DAY	CAL	ATL	MAR	KAN	CLT; DNQ	DOV	TEX	MCH	MLW	MEM	KEN	IRP	NSH	BRI	CHI	IOW	GTW	NHA	LVS	MAR	TAL	TEX	PHO	HOM	120th	0	
2012	RAB Racing	09	Toyota	DAY	MAR; 23	CAR; 20	KAN; 16	CLT; 16	DOV; 16	TEX; 27	KEN; 31	IOW; 20	CHI; 14	POC; 8	MCH; 25	BRI; 24	ATL; 19	IOW; 15	KEN; 10	LVS; 14	TAL; 25	MAR; 18	TEX; 16	PHO; 13	HOM; 32				16th	521	
2013	Red Horse Racing	7	Toyota	DAY; 21	MAR; 32	CAR; 11	KAN; 32	CLT; 8	DOV; 11	TEX; 15	KEN; 11	IOW; 12	ELD; 22	POC; 17	MCH; 7	BRI; 30	MSP; 12	IOW; 11	CHI; 6	LVS; 7	TAL; 7	MAR; 13	TEX; 9	PHO; 27	HOM; 6				11th	641	
2014	Wauters Motorsports	5	Toyota	DAY; 14	MAR; 20	KAN; 11	CLT; 4	DOV; 12	TEX; 5	GTW; 8	KEN; 21																		15th	499	
2014	Athenian Motorsports	05	Toyota									IOW; 22	ELD; 19	POC	MCH	BRI; 29	MSP	CHI; 15	NHA; 18	LVS; 11	TAL; 8	MAR; 33	TEX; 20	PHO; 33	HOM; 35				15th	499	
2015	Athenian Motorsports	05	Chevy	DAY; 22	ATL; 12	MAR; 8	KAN; 12	CLT; 6	DOV; 18	TEX; 3	GTW; 11	IOW; 10	KEN; 8	ELD; 14	POC; 17	MCH; 17	BRI; 11	MSP; 25	CHI; 10	NHA; 26	LVS; 1	TAL; 16	MAR; 11	TEX; 17	PHO; 3	HOM; 10			8th	730	
2016	Athenian Motorsports	05	Chevy	DAY; 26	ATL; 7	MAR; 21	**KAN**; 26	DOV; 29	CLT; 16	TEX; 17	IOW; 19	GTW; 23	KEN	ELD	POC; 29	BRI; 10	**MCH**; 12	MSP; 12	CHI; 20	NHA; 12	LVS; 13	TAL; 28	MAR; 21	TEX	PHO	HOM			17th	255	

==== Busch East Series ====
NASCAR Busch East Series results
Year	Team	No.	Make	1	2	3	4	5	6	7	8	9	10	11	12	13	NBEC	Pts	Ref
2007	STI Motorsports	3	Chevy	GRE; 10	ELK	IOW; 23	SBO	STA	NHA	TMP	NSH	ADI	LRP	MFD	NHA	DOV	42nd	228	

^{*} Season still in progress
^{1} Ineligible for series points

=== ARCA Racing Series ===
(key) (Bold – Pole position awarded by qualifying time. Italics – Pole position earned by points standings or practice time. * – Most laps led.)

ARCA Racing Series results
Year	Team	No.	Make	1	2	3	4	5	6	7	8	9	10	11	12	13	14	15	16	17	18	19	20	21	ARSC	Pts	Ref
2008	RAB Racing	09	Ford	DAY; 11	SLM; 7	IOW; 12	KAN; 15	CAR; 12	KEN; 5	TOL; 16	POC; 20	MCH; 13	CAY; 9	KEN; 34	BLN; 8	POC; 9	NSH; 33	ISF; 15	DSF; 11	CHI; 40	SLM; 7	NJE; 18	TAL; 7	TOL; 6	7th	4540	
2009	RAB Racing	09	Ford	DAY; 4	SLM	CAR	TAL; 17	KEN	TOL	POC	MCH	MFD	IOW	KEN	BLN	POC	ISF	CHI	TOL	DSF	NJE	SLM	KAN	CAR	75th	355	
2010	Venturini Motorsports	35	Toyota	DAY; 3	PBE	SLM	TEX	TAL	TOL	POC	MCH	IOW	MFD	POC	BLN	NJE	ISF	CHI	DSF	TOL	SLM	KAN	CAR		84th	215	
2012	Venturini Motorsports	35	Toyota	DAY	MOB	SLM	TAL	TOL	ELK	POC	MCH	WIN	NJE	IOW	CHI	IRP	POC	BLN	ISF	MAD	SLM	DSF	KAN; 28		129th	100	
2013	Venturini Motorsports	15	Toyota	**DAY**; 1	MOB		TAL; 34	TOL	ELK	POC	MCH													KAN; 3	25th	1095	
2013	Venturini Motorsports	55	Toyota			SLM; 13						ROA; 15	WIN	CHI	NJE	POC	BLN	ISF	MAD	DSF	IOW	SLM	KEN		25th	1095	
2014	Venturini Motorsports	15	Toyota	DAY; 11	MOB; 8	SLM; 21	TAL; 2	TOL; 5	NJE; 14	POC; 3	MCH; 4	ELK; 9	WIN; 8	**CHI**; 22	IRP; 6	POC; INQ^{†}	BLN	ISF	MAD; 10	DSF; 12	SLM	KEN	KAN; 6		8th	3295	
2015	Mason Mitchell Motorsports	88	Chevy	DAY	MOB	NSH	SLM	TAL	TOL	NJE	POC	MCH	CHI	WIN	IOW	IRP	POC	BLN	ISF	DSF	SLM	KEN	KAN; 5		89th	210	
2016	Athenian Motorsports	05	Chevy	DAY; 1	NSH; 4*	SLM; 7	TAL; 29	TOL	NJE	POC; 19	MCH	MAD	WIN	IOW	IRP	POC; 2	BLN; 15	ISF; 20	DSF	SLM; 5	CHI; 2	KEN; 23	KAN; 7		12th	2125	
^{†} – Qualified but replaced by B. J. McLeod.
