= 2015 NASCAR Camping World Truck Series =

American motorsport season

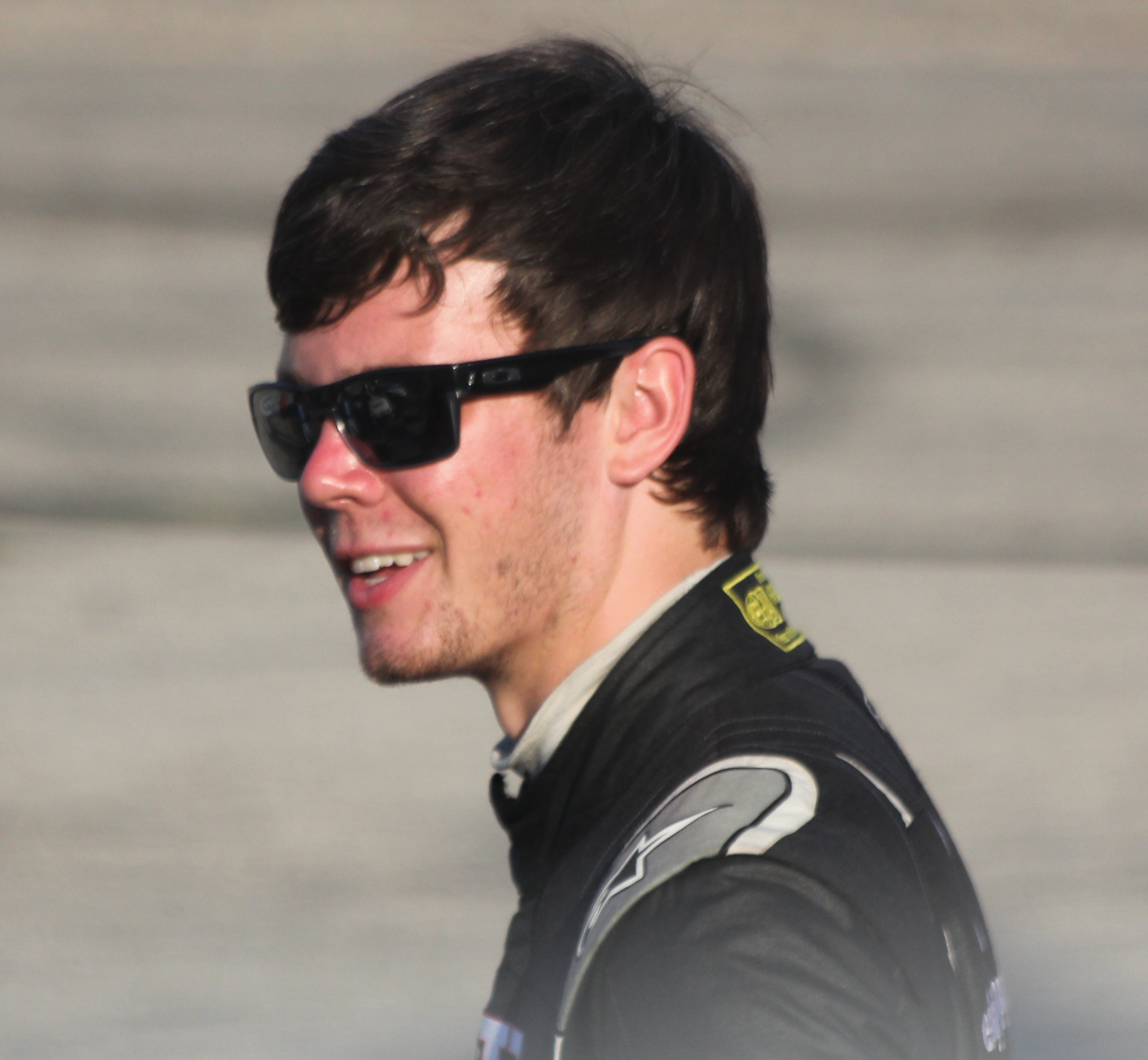
Erik Jones, the 2015 Camping World Truck Series champion as well as rookie of the year.

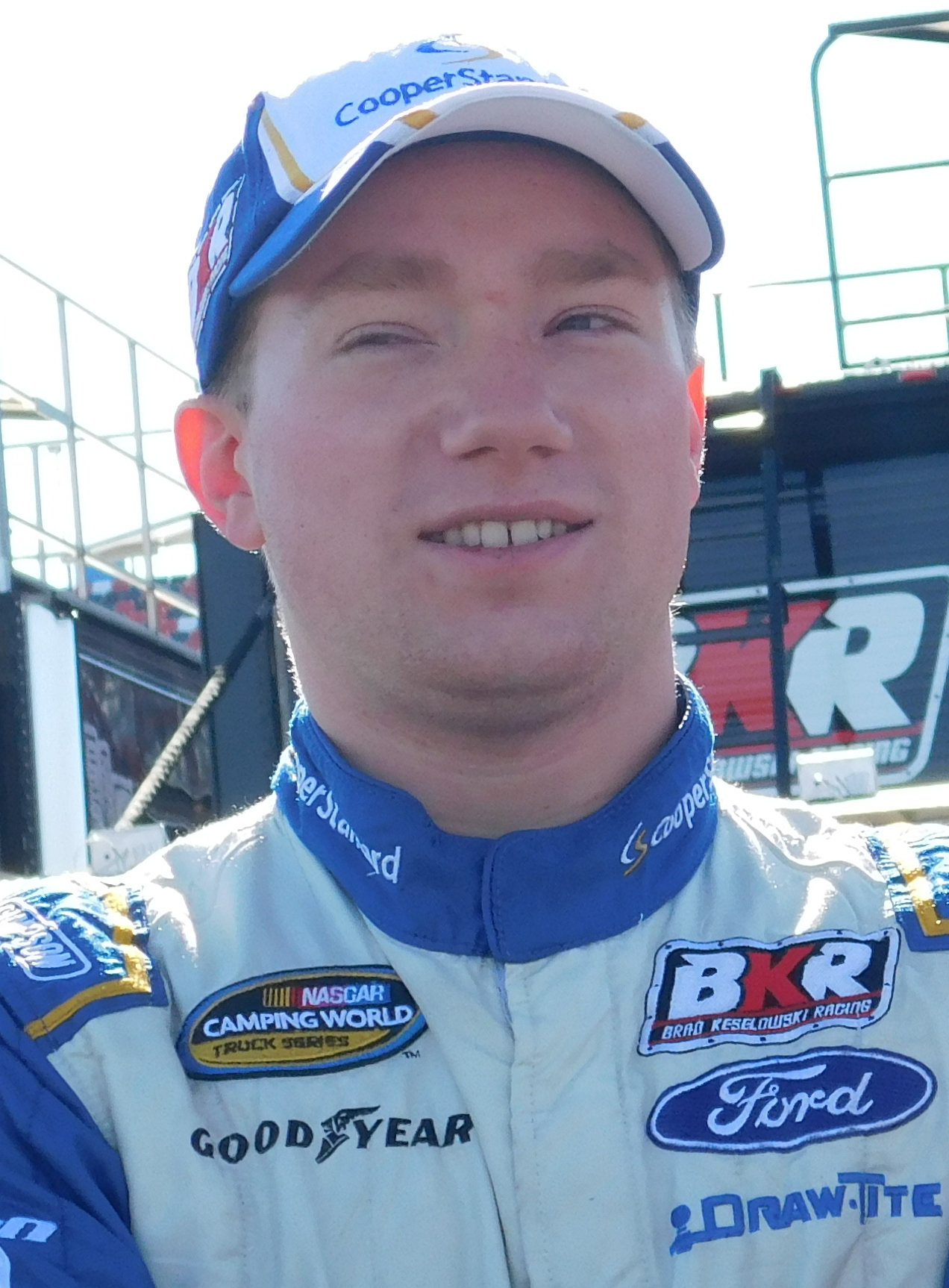
Tyler Reddick finished second behind Jones.

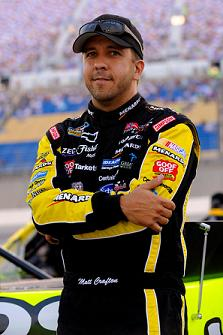
Matt Crafton, the 2013 and 2014 champion, finished third in the championship.

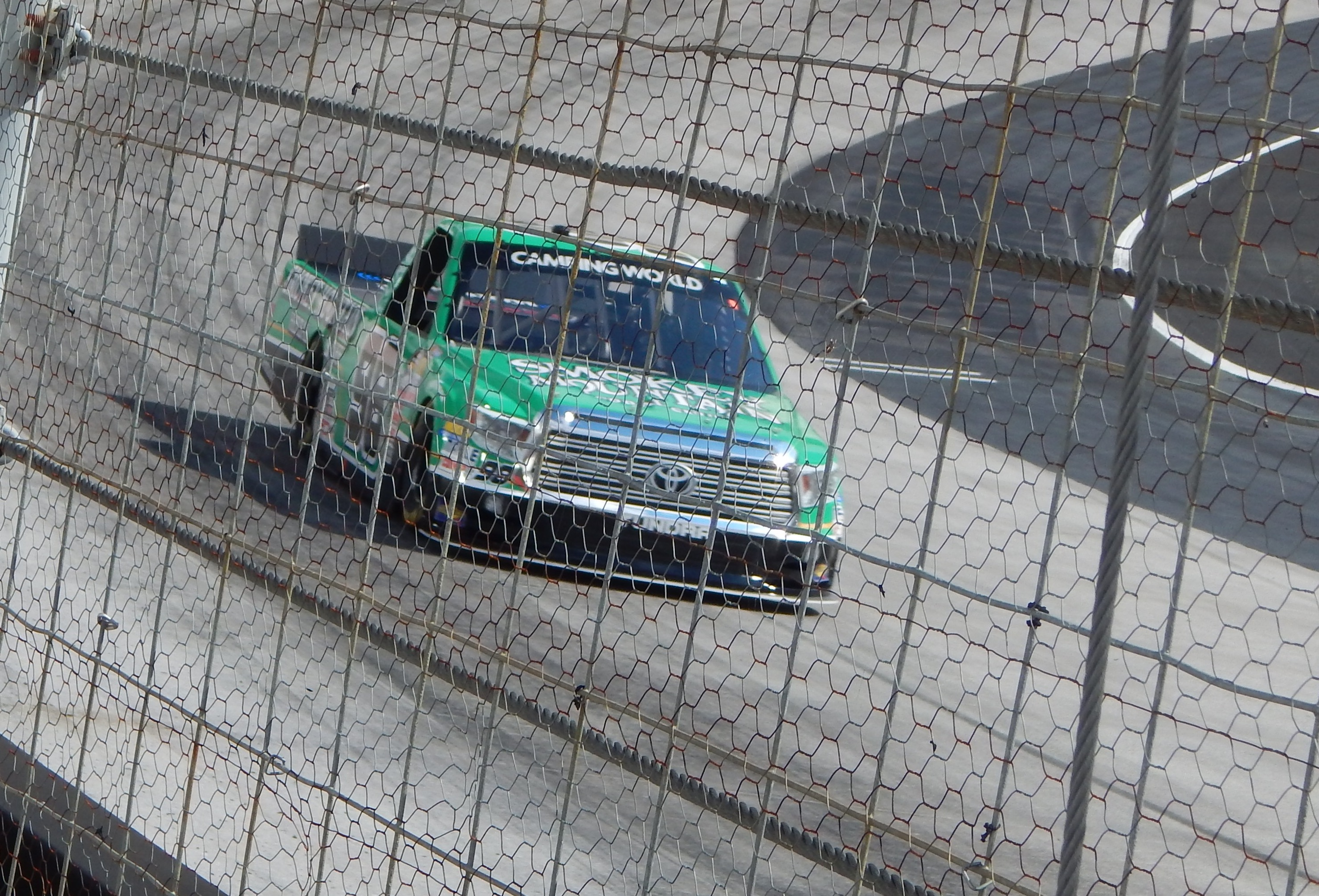
Toyota won the NASCAR manufacturers' championship with 14 wins and 1049 points.

The 2015 NASCAR Camping World Truck Series was the 21st season of the NASCAR Camping World Truck Series, the pickup truck racing series sanctioned by NASCAR in North America. It was contested over twenty-three races, beginning with the NextEra Energy Resources 250 at Daytona International Speedway and ending with the Ford EcoBoost 200 at Homestead–Miami Speedway. Erik Jones of Kyle Busch Motorsports won the series championship, becoming the youngest champion in the Camping World Truck Series.

== Teams and drivers ==
=== Complete schedule ===
Manufacturer	Team	No.	Driver(s)	Crew Chief
Chevrolet	Athenian Motorsports	05	John Wes Townley	Michael Shelton
Chevrolet	Billy Boat Motorsports	15	Mason Mingus 22	Dennis Connor 3 Bruce Cook 4 Brandon McSwain 16
Chevrolet	Billy Boat Motorsports	15	Chad Boat 1	Dennis Connor 3 Bruce Cook 4 Brandon McSwain 16
Chevrolet	GMS Racing	23	Spencer Gallagher (R)	Jeff Stankiewicz
Chevrolet	GMS Racing	33	Ty Dillon 3	Shane Huffman
Chevrolet	GMS Racing	33	Brandon Jones (R) 17	Shane Huffman
Chevrolet	GMS Racing	33	Austin Dillon 3	Shane Huffman
Chevrolet	Jennifer Jo Cobb Racing	10	Jennifer Jo Cobb	Steve Kuykendall
Chevrolet	MAKE Motorsports	1	Donnie Neuenberger 1	R. J. Jobman 2 Tim Silva 1 R. B. Bracken 4 Jeff Barnes 5 Brian Lear 9
Chevrolet	MAKE Motorsports	1	Morgan Shepherd 1	R. J. Jobman 2 Tim Silva 1 R. B. Bracken 4 Jeff Barnes 5 Brian Lear 9
Chevrolet	MAKE Motorsports	1	Travis Kvapil 11	R. J. Jobman 2 Tim Silva 1 R. B. Bracken 4 Jeff Barnes 5 Brian Lear 9
Chevrolet	MAKE Motorsports	1	Ryan Ellis 6	R. J. Jobman 2 Tim Silva 1 R. B. Bracken 4 Jeff Barnes 5 Brian Lear 9
Chevrolet	MAKE Motorsports	1	Kyle Fowler 1	R. J. Jobman 2 Tim Silva 1 R. B. Bracken 4 Jeff Barnes 5 Brian Lear 9
Chevrolet	MAKE Motorsports	1	Dexter Stacey 1	R. J. Jobman 2 Tim Silva 1 R. B. Bracken 4 Jeff Barnes 5 Brian Lear 9
Chevrolet	Rick Ware Racing	1	Camden Murphy 1	Jeff Barnes
Chevrolet	Rick Ware Racing	1	Rubén Pardo 1	Jeff Barnes
Chevrolet	MB Motorsports	63	Justin Jennings 6	Mike Mittler
Chevrolet	MB Motorsports	63	Garrett Smithley 4	Mike Mittler
Chevrolet	MB Motorsports	63	Jake Griffin 2	Mike Mittler
Chevrolet	MB Motorsports	63	Tyler Tanner 5	Mike Mittler
Chevrolet	MB Motorsports	63	Bobby Pierce 2	Rick Ren 1 Mike Mittler 1
Chevrolet	MB Motorsports	63	Daniel Brown 1	Tripp Bruce
Chevrolet	MB Motorsports	63	Akinori Ogata 3	Mike Mittler
Chevrolet	Norm Benning Racing	6	Norm Benning	Brian Poff
Chevrolet	NTS Motorsports	14	Daniel Hemric (R)	Ryan McKinney
Chevrolet	Premium Motorsports	94	Travis Kvapil 1	John Monsam 6 Wayne Carroll 6 Jay Robinson 4 Jeff Spraker 7
Chevrolet	Premium Motorsports	94	Wendell Chavous (R) 8	John Monsam 6 Wayne Carroll 6 Jay Robinson 4 Jeff Spraker 7
Chevrolet	Premium Motorsports	94	Timmy Hill 12	John Monsam 6 Wayne Carroll 6 Jay Robinson 4 Jeff Spraker 7
Chevrolet	Premium Motorsports	94	T. J. Bell 1	John Monsam 6 Wayne Carroll 6 Jay Robinson 4 Jeff Spraker 7
Chevrolet	Premium Motorsports	94	Wayne Edwards 1	John Monsam 6 Wayne Carroll 6 Jay Robinson 4 Jeff Spraker 7
Chevrolet	SS-Green Light Racing	07	Ray Black Jr. (R)	Jason Miller
Chevrolet	SS-Green Light Racing (Note: Entries were fielded in a partnership between SS-Green Light Racing and B. J. McLeod Motorsports.); B. J. McLeod Motorsports	08	Korbin Forrister (R) 22	Tripp Bruce 3 James Brooks 1 Mike Abner 8 Joe Lax 9 Keith Wolfe 1
Chevrolet	MB Motorsports	08	Brandon Hightower 1 (Note: Entry was fielded in a collaboration with SS-Green Light Racing/B. J. McLeod Motorsports.)	Mike Mittler
Chevrolet	SWM-NEMCO Motorsports	8	Joe Nemechek 4	Gere Kennon Jr.
Chevrolet	SWM-NEMCO Motorsports	8	John Hunter Nemechek (R) 18	Gere Kennon Jr.
Chevrolet	SWM-NEMCO Motorsports	8	Ryan Newman 1	Gere Kennon Jr.
Chevrolet	Young's Motorsports	02	Tyler Young	Bryan Berry
Ford	Brad Keselowski Racing	19	Tyler Reddick	Doug Randolph
Ford	Brad Keselowski Racing	29	Austin Theriault (R) 9	Chad Kendrick
Ford	Brad Keselowski Racing	29	Brad Keselowski 4	Chad Kendrick
Ford	Brad Keselowski Racing	29	Joey Logano 1	Chad Kendrick
Ford	Brad Keselowski Racing	29	Ryan Blaney 5	Chad Kendrick
Ford	Brad Keselowski Racing	29	Alex Tagliani 1	Chad Kendrick
Ford	Brad Keselowski Racing	29	Brian Keselowski 1	Chad Kendrick
Ford	Brad Keselowski Racing	29	Austin Cindric 2	Chad Kendrick
Toyota	Kyle Busch Motorsports	4	Erik Jones (R)	Rudy Fugle
Toyota	Kyle Busch Motorsports	51	Daniel Suárez 13	Jerry Baxter
Toyota	Kyle Busch Motorsports	51	Matt Tifft 6	Jerry Baxter
Toyota	Kyle Busch Motorsports	51	Christopher Bell 1	Jerry Baxter
Toyota	Kyle Busch Motorsports	51	Kyle Busch 3	Jerry Baxter
Toyota	Kyle Busch Motorsports	54	Justin Boston (R) 9	Shannon Rursch18; Eddie Troconis5
Toyota	Kyle Busch Motorsports	54	Christopher Bell 6	Shannon Rursch18; Eddie Troconis5
Toyota	Kyle Busch Motorsports	54	Matt Tifft 3	Shannon Rursch18; Eddie Troconis5
Toyota	Kyle Busch Motorsports	54	Cody Coughlin 1	Shannon Rursch18; Eddie Troconis5
Toyota	Kyle Busch Motorsports	54	Kyle Busch 1	Shannon Rursch18; Eddie Troconis5
Toyota	Kyle Busch Motorsports	54	Gray Gaulding 3	Shannon Rursch18; Eddie Troconis5
Toyota	Red Horse Racing	11	Ben Kennedy	Scott Zipadelli
Toyota	Red Horse Racing	17	Timothy Peters	Marcus Richmond 21; Brad Parrott 1 Butch Hylton 1
Toyota	ThorSport Racing	13	Cameron Hayley (R)	Jeff Hensley
Toyota	ThorSport Racing	88	Matt Crafton	Carl Joiner Jr.
Toyota	ThorSport Racing	98	Johnny Sauter	Doug George
Chevrolet	Bill Martel Racing	50	Kyle Martel 1 (Note: Entries were fielded in a collaboration with MAKE Motorsports.)	Bill Martel
Chevrolet	MAKE Motorsports	50	Cody Ware (R) 3	Tim Silva 6 George Church 1 Brian Lear 6 Jeff Barnes 8 R.B. Jobman 1
Chevrolet	MAKE Motorsports	50	Travis Kvapil 9	Tim Silva 6 George Church 1 Brian Lear 6 Jeff Barnes 8 R.B. Jobman 1
Chevrolet	MAKE Motorsports	50	Donnie Neuenberger 1	Tim Silva 6 George Church 1 Brian Lear 6 Jeff Barnes 8 R.B. Jobman 1
Chevrolet	MAKE Motorsports	50	Ryan Ellis 4	Tim Silva 6 George Church 1 Brian Lear 6 Jeff Barnes 8 R.B. Jobman 1
Chevrolet	MAKE Motorsports	50	Tyler Tanner 3	Tim Silva 6 George Church 1 Brian Lear 6 Jeff Barnes 8 R.B. Jobman 1
Chevrolet	MAKE Motorsports	50	Dexter Stacey 1	Tim Silva 6 George Church 1 Brian Lear 6 Jeff Barnes 8 R.B. Jobman 1
Ford	Jacob Wallace Racing	50	Jody Knowles 1	Tim Silva 6 George Church 1 Brian Lear 6 Jeff Barnes 8 R.B. Jobman 1
Chevrolet 21 Ram 2	Mike Harmon Racing	74	Jordan Anderson 19	Chad Frewaldt 1 Glenn Parker 1 Gary Ritter 8 Mike Harmon 3 Jason Little 1 Dan Kolanda 9
Chevrolet 21 Ram 2	Mike Harmon Racing	74	Paige Decker 2	Chad Frewaldt 1 Glenn Parker 1 Gary Ritter 8 Mike Harmon 3 Jason Little 1 Dan Kolanda 9
Chevrolet 21 Ram 2	Mike Harmon Racing	74	Tim Viens 1	Chad Frewaldt 1 Glenn Parker 1 Gary Ritter 8 Mike Harmon 3 Jason Little 1 Dan Kolanda 9
Chevrolet 21 Ram 2	Mike Harmon Racing	74	Stew Hayward 1	Chad Frewaldt 1 Glenn Parker 1 Gary Ritter 8 Mike Harmon 3 Jason Little 1 Dan Kolanda 9

=== Limited schedule ===
Manufacturer	Team	No.	Driver(s)	Crew Chief	Rounds
Chevrolet	Bill Martel Racing	59	Kyle Martel	Bill Martel	1
Chevrolet	Billy Boat Motorsports	16	Chad Boat	Bruce Cook	4
Chevrolet	Brandonbilt Motorsports	86	Brandon Brown	Adam Brenner	9
Chevrolet	Braun Motorsports	32	Justin Haley	Travis McFarland 1 Shannon Rursch 2	3
Chevrolet	Clay Greenfield Motorsports	68	Clay Greenfield	Gary Mann 2 Danny Gill 1	3
Chevrolet	Cody Lane Motorsports	27	Cody Lane	Tony Furr	1
Chevrolet	B. J. McLeod Motorsports	35	Tommy Regan	Keith Wolfe	1
Chevrolet	B. J. McLeod Motorsports	45	B. J. McLeod	Keith Wolfe	10
Chevrolet	B. J. McLeod Motorsports	45	Tommy Regan	Keith Wolfe	2
Chevrolet	B. J. McLeod Motorsports	45	Chris Fontaine	Keith Wolfe	1
Chevrolet	B. J. McLeod Motorsports	45	Brandon Hightower	Keith Wolfe	1
Chevrolet	Peck Motorsports	45	Todd Peck (Note: Entries were fielded in a collaboration with B. J. McLeod Motorsports.)	Keith Wolfe	2
Chevrolet	Rick Ware Racing	45	Rubén Pardo	Keith Wolfe	1
Chevrolet	FDNY Racing	28	Ryan Ellis	Dick Rahilly	3
Chevrolet	FDNY Racing	28	Andy Seuss	Dick Rahilly	1
Chevrolet	GMS Racing	21	Brennan Poole	Harold Holly	1
Chevrolet	Henderson Motorsports	75	Caleb Holman	Chris Carrier	7
Chevrolet	Jennifer Jo Cobb Racing	0	Caleb Roark	Joe Cobb; Austin Zivich	9
Chevrolet	Jennifer Jo Cobb Racing	0	Adam Edwards	Joe Cobb; Austin Zivich	2
Chevrolet	Jennifer Jo Cobb Racing	0	Brad Foy	Joe Cobb; Austin Zivich	1
Chevrolet	NTS Motorsports	0	Scott Lagasse Jr. (Note: Entry was fielded in a collaboration with Jennifer Jo Cobb Racing.)	Joe Cobb; Austin Zivich	1
Chevrolet	JR Motorsports	00	Cole Custer	Joe Shear Jr.	10
Chevrolet	JR Motorsports	00	Kasey Kahne	Joe Shear Jr.	1
Chevrolet	JR Motorsports	00	Kevin Harvick	Joe Shear Jr.	1
Chevrolet	JR Motorsports	00	Alex Bowman	Joe Shear Jr.	1
Chevrolet	JR Motorsports	00	Kyle Larson	Joe Shear Jr.	1
Chevrolet	JR Motorsports	00	Jeb Burton	Joe Shear Jr.	1
Chevrolet	MB Motorsports	36	Justin Jennings	Michael Mittler	10
Chevrolet	MB Motorsports	36	Tyler Tanner	Michael Mittler	4
Chevrolet	MB Motorsports	36	Bobby Pierce	Michael Mittler	2
Chevrolet	Bobby Gerhart Racing	36	Bobby Gerhart (Note: Entry was fielded in a collaboration with MB Motorsports.)	Mark Skibo	1
Chevrolet	Mike Affarano Motorsports	03	Mike Affarano	David McClure	4
Chevrolet	Mike Affarano Motorsports	03	Jake Griffin	David McClure	1
Chevrolet	Mike Affarano Motorsports	03	Tim Viens	David McClure	2
Chevrolet	Norm Benning Racing	57	Joey Gattina	James Trueman	1
Chevrolet	NTS Motorsports	20	Scott Lagasse Jr.	Doug Howe	1
Chevrolet	NTS Motorsports	31	James Buescher	Chris Rice	3
Chevrolet	NTS Motorsports	31	Scott Lagasse Jr.	Chris Rice	2
Chevrolet	NTS Motorsports	31	Austin Dillon	Chris Rice	1
Chevrolet	NTS Motorsports	31	Ty Dillon	Chris Rice	1
Chevrolet	NTS Motorsports	31	Travis Pastrana	Chris Rice	1
Chevrolet	NTS Motorsports	31	Rico Abreu	Chris Rice	2
Chevrolet	Peck Motorsports	40	Todd Peck	Keith Wolfe	4
Chevrolet	RSS Racing	39	Ryan Sieg	Chris Jones	1
Chevrolet	Stanton Barrett Motorsports	91	Stanton Barrett	Paul Andrews	1
Chevrolet	T3R2	99	Bryan Silas	Cal Boprey	3
RAM	NDS Motorsports	53	Robert Mitten	Jim Killer	1
RAM	Trophy Girl Racing	44	Josh Reaume	Will Lind	2
Ford	Charles Buchanan Racing	87	Chuck Buchanan Jr.	Craig Wood	2
Ford	Empire Racing	82	Austin Hill	Mike Cheek	4
Ford	Empire Racing	82	Sean Corr	Mike Cheek	1
Ford	Lira Motorsports	58	Kyle Weatherman	Teddy Brown	1
Ford	Lira Motorsports	59	David Levine	Sam Schram	1
Ford	RBR Enterprises	92	David Gilliland	Michael Hester	7
Ford	Tracy Wallace Racing	80	Madeline Crane	Wayne Hansard	1
Toyota	Glenden Enterprises	84	Chris Fontaine	Kevin Ingram	1
Toyota	Glenden Enterprises	45	Chris Fontaine	Keith Wolfe	1
Toyota	Hattori Racing Enterprises	18	Ross Chastain	Jamie Jones	1
Toyota	Hattori Racing Enterprises	18	Ross Kenseth	Jamie Jones	2
Toyota	Ken Schrader Racing	52	Ken Schrader	Donnie Richeson	1
Toyota	Kyle Busch Motorsports	9	William Byron	Wes Ward	1
Toyota	Red Horse Racing	7	Gray Gaulding	Butch Hylton	1
Toyota	Team Little Racing	97	Jesse Little	Harold Holly 2 Chris Carrier 1 Bud Haefele 1	4
Toyota	Venturini Motorsports	25	Matt Tifft	David Leiner	3
Toyota	Venturini Motorsports	25	Cody Coughlin	David Leiner	1
Toyota	Venturini Motorsports	25	Brian Wong	David Leiner	1
Toyota	Wauters Motorsports	5	Dalton Sargeant	Richie Wauters	4
Toyota	Win-Tron Racing	35	Justin Marks	Jamie Jones	1
Chevrolet 1 Ford 1	Empire Racing	35	Cody Erickson	Mike Cheek	1
Chevrolet 1 Ford 1	Empire Racing	35	Jim Weiler	Kevin Cywinski	1
Chevrolet 1 RAM 1	Mike Harmon Racing	49	Mike Harmon	Gary Ritter	1
Chevrolet 1 RAM 1	Mike Harmon Racing	49	Cassie Gannis	Gary Ritter	1
Ford 2 Chevrolet 1	Rette Jones Racing	30	Chad Finley	Mark Rette	2
Ford 2 Chevrolet 1	Rette Jones Racing	30	Terry Jones	Mark Rette	1

=== Driver changes ===
- Tyler Reddick began driving full-time in the No. 19 Ford F-150 for Brad Keselowski Racing. Reddick ran part-time for BKR in 2014 in the same truck.
- Erik Jones and Justin Boston attempted their first full-time campaigns for Kyle Busch Motorsports, replacing Bubba Wallace.
- Daniel Suárez and Matt Tifft ran part-time schedules for KBM, sharing the ride with team owner Kyle Busch.
- Following the divestiture of HScott Motorsports Truck Series operations upon Harry Scott buying out Steve Turner, Ben Kennedy moved over to Red Horse Racing, replacing Germán Quiroga.
- Also, JR Motorsports purchased most of the HScott Truck operations. Cole Custer, who had raced selected age-eligible races for Turner Scott, also moved to JR Motorsports. The team raced primarily races where Custer was eligible (age 17), with five more races run by Sprint Cup drivers at tracks where Custer was ineligible to participate, in preparation for the 2016 season.
- Due to a lack of sponsorship, Joey Coulter did not race in 2015. Instead, he assumed the post of team relationships coordinator for GMS Racing.
- Spencer Gallagher piloted the No. 23 Chevrolet Silverado for GMS Racing full-time in 2015, after driving part-time in 2014.
- Daniel Hemric drove the No. 14 for NTS Motorsports full-time in 2015, after running one race with NTS Motorsports in 2014.

== Schedule ==
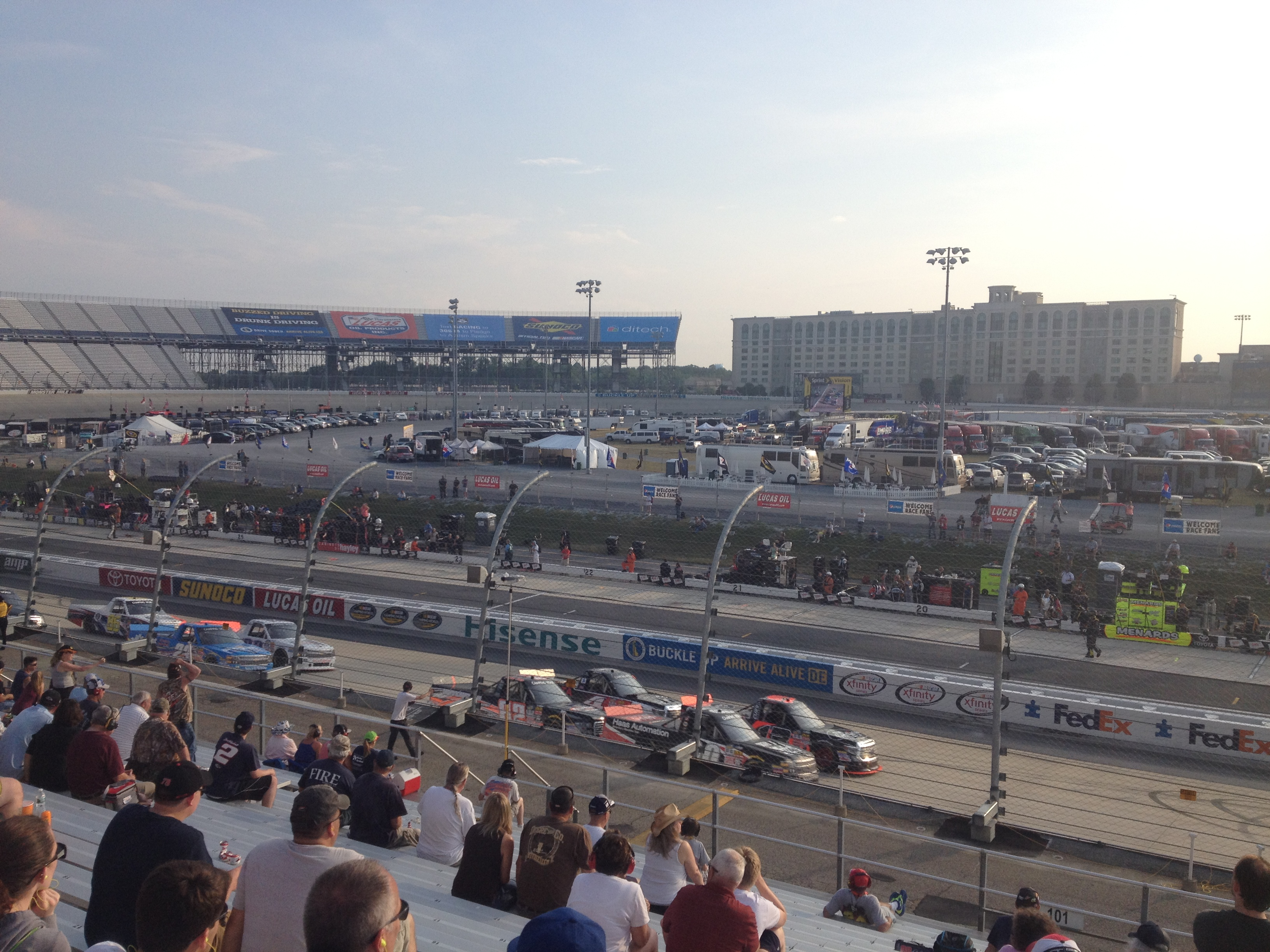
The Lucas Oil 200 at Dover International Speedway in May

The final calendar was released on August 26, 2014, comprising 23 races. Atlanta Motor Speedway, which has not hosted the series since 2012, will return for the second week of the season in late February as a Saturday doubleheader with the Xfinity Series. Fox Sports 1 will televise every race except the Fred's 250 on October 24, which will air on Fox.

No.	Race title	Track	Location	Date
1	NextEra Energy Resources 250	Daytona International Speedway	Daytona Beach, Florida	February 20
2	Hyundai Construction Equipment 200	Atlanta Motor Speedway	Hampton, Georgia	February 28
3	Kroger 250	Martinsville Speedway	Ridgeway, Virginia	March 28
4	Toyota Tundra 250	Kansas Speedway	Kansas City, Kansas	May 8
5	North Carolina Education Lottery 200	Charlotte Motor Speedway	Concord, North Carolina	May 15
6	Lucas Oil 200	Dover International Speedway	Dover, Delaware	May 29
7	WinStar World Casino & Resort 400	Texas Motor Speedway	Fort Worth, Texas	June 5
8	American Ethanol presents the Drivin' for Linemen 200	Gateway Motorsports Park	Madison, Illinois	June 13
9	American Ethanol 200	Iowa Speedway	Newton, Iowa	June 19
10	UNOH 225	Kentucky Speedway	Sparta, Kentucky	July 9
11	1-800-CAR-CASH Mudsummer Classic	Eldora Speedway	Allen Township, Darke County, Ohio	July 22
12	Pocono Mountains 150	Pocono Raceway	Long Pond, Pennsylvania	August 1
13	Careers for Veterans 200	Michigan International Speedway	Cambridge Township, Michigan	August 15
14	UNOH 200	Bristol Motor Speedway	Bristol, Tennessee	August 19
15	Chevrolet Silverado 250	Canadian Tire Motorsport Park	Clarington, Ontario, Canada	August 30
16	American Ethanol E15 225	Chicagoland Speedway	Joliet, Illinois	September 19†
17	UNOH 175	New Hampshire Motor Speedway	Loudon, New Hampshire	September 26
18	Rhino Linings 350	Las Vegas Motor Speedway	Las Vegas, Nevada	October 3
19	Fred's 250	Talladega Superspeedway	Lincoln, Alabama	October 24
20	Kroger 200	Martinsville Speedway	Ridgeway, Virginia	October 31
21	WinStar World Casino & Resort 350	Texas Motor Speedway	Fort Worth, Texas	November 6
22	Lucas Oil 150	Phoenix International Raceway	Avondale, Arizona	November 13
23	Ford EcoBoost 200	Homestead–Miami Speedway	Homestead, Florida	November 20
†: The American Ethanol E15 225 was postponed a day due to persistent rain.

== Results and standings ==
=== Races ===
No.	Race	Pole position	Most laps led	Winning driver	Manufacturer
1	NextEra Energy Resources 250	Ty Dillon	Tyler Reddick	Tyler Reddick	Ford
2	Hyundai Construction Equipment 200	Ben Kennedy	Matt Crafton	Matt Crafton	Toyota
3	Kroger 250	Joey Logano	Joey Logano	Joey Logano	Ford
4	Toyota Tundra 250	Erik Jones	Erik Jones	Matt Crafton	Toyota
5	North Carolina Education Lottery 200	Kasey Kahne	Erik Jones	Kasey Kahne	Chevrolet
6	Lucas Oil 200	Ryan Blaney	Cole Custer	Tyler Reddick	Ford
7	WinStar World Casino & Resort 400	Erik Jones	Matt Crafton	Matt Crafton	Toyota
8	American Ethanol presents the Drivin' for Linemen 200	Erik Jones	Erik Jones	Cole Custer	Chevrolet
9	American Ethanol 200	Erik Jones	Erik Jones	Erik Jones	Toyota
10	UNOH 225	Matt Crafton	Erik Jones	Matt Crafton	Toyota
11	1-800-CAR-CASH Mudsummer Classic	Bobby Pierce	Christopher Bell	Christopher Bell	Toyota
12	Pocono Mountains 150	Erik Jones	Kyle Busch	Kyle Busch	Toyota
13	Careers for Veterans 200	Matt Crafton	Kyle Busch	Kyle Busch	Toyota
14	UNOH 200	Kyle Busch	Cole Custer	Ryan Blaney	Ford
15	Chevrolet Silverado 250	Alex Tagliani	Cole Custer	Erik Jones	Toyota
16	American Ethanol E15 225	Kyle Larson	Johnny Sauter	John Hunter Nemechek	Chevrolet
17	UNOH 175	Austin Dillon	Austin Dillon	Austin Dillon	Chevrolet
18	Rhino Linings 350	Matt Crafton	Matt Crafton	John Wes Townley	Chevrolet
19	Fred's 250	Timothy Peters	Matt Crafton	Timothy Peters	Toyota
20	Kroger 200	Cole Custer	Cole Custer	Matt Crafton	Toyota
21	WinStar World Casino & Resort 350	Matt Crafton	Erik Jones	Erik Jones	Toyota
22	Lucas Oil 150	Erik Jones	Erik Jones	Timothy Peters	Toyota
23	Ford EcoBoost 200	Matt Crafton	Matt Crafton	Matt Crafton	Toyota

=== Drivers' championship ===
(key) Bold - Pole position awarded by time. Italics - Pole position set by final practice results or rainout. * – Most laps led.

Pos.	Driver	Races																							Points
Pos.	Driver	DAY	ATL	MAR	KAN	CLT	DOV	TEX	GTW	IOW	KEN	ELD	POC	MCH	BRI	MSP	CHI	NHA	LVS	TAL	MAR	TEX	PHO	HOM	Points
1	Erik Jones **(R)**	2	7	3	**11***	2*	3	**15**	**23***	**1***	2*	4	**10**	3	6	1	6	7	9	4	10	1*	**9***	6	899
2	Tyler Reddick	1*	5	5	13	4	1	11	8	3	6	3	3	9	8	19	2	15	7	5	5	5	5	3	884
3	Matt Crafton	8	1*	2	1	3	5	1*	21	4	1	9	28	**6**	7	2	14	2	**8***	24*	1	**4**	23	**1***	877
4	Johnny Sauter	10	6	4	3	15	9	4	3	17	12	22	6	4	9	6	5*	3	12	7	9	13	25	7	809
5	Timothy Peters	24	9	18	4	7	20	21	6	6	5	23	7	8	12	22	3	4	2	**1**	6	6	1	5	804
6	Cameron Hayley **(R)**	23	14	11	5	14	21	7	5	19	9	8	4	10	18	7	16	12	10	6	3	10	11	9	766
7	Daniel Hemric **(R)**	26	19	12	10	17	4	9	9	8	18	5	9	7	4	4	25	6	6	28	12	14	21	8	733
8	John Wes Townley	22	12	8	12	6	18	3	11	10	8	14	17	17	11	25	10	26	1	16	11	17	3	10	730
9	Ben Kennedy	28	**3**	19	26	16	6	10	7	13	16	12	11	25	15	3	12	23	3	25	14	9	24	4	694
10	Spencer Gallagher **(R)**	21	13	14	17	10	12	12	2	7	24	17	14	16	22	8	8	28	15	18	29	12	6	11	677
11	Ray Black Jr. **(R)**	5	25	13	21	22	11	16	13	15	13	15	24	26	21	15	11	13	13	14	20	19	20	18	635
12	John Hunter Nemechek **(R)**			29			22		4	23	11	7	13	12	3	9	1	5	4	11	2	11	2	2	630
13	Tyler Young	13	22	20	23	18	10	14	15	20	26	13	15	15	17	17	15	16	17	10	13	23	13	19	629
14	Mason Mingus	DNQ	28	22	9	26	29	13	28	16	19		12	24	29	14	26	14	20	3	18	18	10	20	527
15	Brandon Jones **(R)**			15	30	13	8	22	12	2	10				5	26	17		5	2	7	7	32	31	482
16	Travis Kvapil	15		32	25	28	19		14	24	14	30	23	18	19	24	24	17	18	27	15	26	15	22	477
17	Jennifer Jo Cobb	18	26	24	19	19	32	19	20	21	23	27	26	19	25	20	23	22	21	32	31	24	22	26	473
18	Korbin Forrister **(R)**	12	20	23	22	29	17	18	22	26	21	24	27	22	27	18	27	28	27	15		22	30	27	463
19	Jordan Anderson	DNQ	23		18	23		24	19	22	28		18	13	DNQ	16	20	25	22	19		21	29	29	379
20	Norm Benning	14	31	28	24	32	26	25	26	25	31	19	22	27	24	21	22	DNQ	26	21	DNQ	27	DNQ	DNQ	365
21	Matt Tifft	19		9	29	8			25			21	8			23	9		19	23			8		327
22	Cole Custer			16			13*		1	9		29			16*	10*		24			**4***		26		305
23	Timmy Hill						15	23	18	18	15						18	20		20	26	20	18	21	297
24	Austin Theriault **(R)**	4			14			5	10	12							13	8	31	INJ	INJ	INJ	INJ	12	279
25	Justin Boston **(R)**	29	16	10	7	9	25	8	27	11															255
26	Justin Jennings	DNQ			27	30^{1}	28	26	29	31	22		31	32	20	29	19	32	29			25			237
27	Christopher Bell									5	17	1*							14	13		8		25	231
28	Tyler Tanner				15	21	31	17	16					29	32		32	30	32	26		31			217
29	Ryan Ellis	16^{2}			20	DNQ	24	20	17	29	30		20		28	31	29			DNQ					192
30	Caleb Holman		17	21		24				14	27				31						8				166
31	Wendell Chavous **(R)**		24	DNQ	16	25						26	25	23	26										143
32	B. J. McLeod				28	31	27	27^{1}			29		29	30	DNQ	28	28		28						138
33	Joe Nemechek	20	10			11		6																	129
34	Gray Gaulding			17												11		10			21				118
35	Dalton Sargeant														10			9			28		19		110
36	James Buescher	17	8	7																					100
37	Garrett Smithley		18										16	14										28	100
38	Chad Boat											31					DNQ		25	9			12		99
39	Bobby Pierce											**2**									22		16	DNQ	93
40	Brandon Brown		29	DNQ		DNQ	14				25							27			DNQ			32	93
41	Caleb Roark				32					32^{1}			32	28	DNQ		31	31	30			32	DNQ		92
42	Jesse Little						30										30					15		14	87
43	Justin Haley														14						32		7		79
44	Austin Hill	30^{1}					16													22	19				75
45	Bryan Silas	7	21	31																					73
46	Todd Peck	27				DNQ							21	31								28		DNQ	69
47	Chris Fontaine	25^{1}										16								8					64
48	Akinori Ogata																	18	23				27		64
49	Tommy Regan			25					24	28															55
50	Rubén Pardo																	21					17		50
51	Austin Cindric																				25		14		49
52	Cody Coughlin										20			20											48
53	Rico Abreu																						28	13	47
54	Chad Finley													21			21								46
55	Clay Greenfield	DNQ																19		30					39
56	Dexter Stacey																					29		24	35
57	Jake Griffin			26						27		DNQ													35
58	Ken Schrader											11													33
59	Brian Wong															12									32
60	Cody Ware **(R)**	DNQ	30	27																					31
61	Donnie Neuenberger	31						28																	29
62	Travis Pastrana																		16						28
63	Brian Keselowski																			17					28
64	David Levine																							17	27
65	Jody Knowles											18													26
66	Kyle Martel						DNQ						19												25
67	Sean Corr											20													24
68	Tim Viens						23						DNQ	DNQ											21
69	Kyle Weatherman																							23	21
70	Wayne Edwards																		24						20
71	Camden Murphy																				24				20
72	Cody Erickson											25													19
73	Brandon Hightower																				27		DNQ		17
74	Daniel Brown															27									17
75	Adam Edwards							30	31^{1}																14
76	Paige Decker			DNQ																	30				14
77	Terry Jones																			31					13
78	William Byron																						31		13
79	Stew Hayward											32													12
	Joey Gattina								32^{1}																0
	Robert Mitten															DNS									0
	Chuck Buchanan Jr.			DNQ																	DNQ				0
	Madeline Crane											DNQ													0
	Cody Lane														DNQ										0
	Andy Seuss																			DNQ					0
	Jim Weiler																				DNQ				0
	Cassie Gannis																						DNQ		0
	Brad Foy																				Wth				0
Ineligible for Camping World Truck championship points
Pos.	Driver	DAY	ATL	MAR	KAN	CLT	DOV	TEX	GTW	IOW	KEN	ELD	POC	MCH	BRI	MSP	CHI	NHA	LVS	TAL	MAR	TEX	PHO	HOM	Points
	Kyle Busch												1*	1*	**2**			11							
	Ryan Blaney						**7**				3			2	1							3			
	Austin Dillon											6	5	5				**1***							
	Joey Logano			**1***																					
	Kasey Kahne					**1**																			
	Daniel Suárez	9	4	6	6		2	2			4				30		4				16	2	4	30	
	Ty Dillon	**11**	2									10			23										
	Ryan Newman				2																				
	Kevin Harvick												2												
	Scott Lagasse Jr.	3			8	12																		15	
	Brad Keselowski		15			5						28	30												
	Alex Tagliani															**5**									
	David Gilliland	6		30		27					7				13						23			16	
	Kyle Larson																7								
	Ryan Sieg		11																						
	Alex Bowman													11											
	Brennan Poole																		11						
	Bobby Gerhart																			12					
	T. J. Bell															13									
	Jeb Burton																					16			
	Ross Kenseth																				17			DNQ	
	Kyle Fowler					20																			
	Morgan Shepherd		27																						
	Mike Affarano				31^{1}			29^{1}	30^{1}	30															
	Stanton Barrett																			29					
	Josh Reaume															30		DNQ							
	Mike Harmon																					30			
	Justin Marks	32																							
	Ross Chastain																DNQ								
Pos.	Driver	DAY	ATL	MAR	KAN	CLT	DOV	TEX	GTW	IOW	KEN	ELD	POC	MCH	BRI	MSP	CHI	NHA	LVS	TAL	MAR	TEX	PHO	HOM	Points
Pos.	Driver	Races																							Points
^{1} – Post entry, driver and owner did not score points.^{2} – Ryan Ellis started receiving Camping World Truck Series points at Kansas.

=== Owners' championship (Top 15) ===
Pos.	No.	Car Owner	Driver	Races																							Points
Pos.	No.	Car Owner	Driver	DAY	ATL	MAR	KAN	CLT	DOV	TEX	GTW	IOW	KEN	ELD	POC	MCH	BRI	MSP	CHI	NHA	LVS	TAL	MAR	TEX	PHO	HOM	Points
1	4	Kyle Busch	Erik Jones **(R)**	2	7	3	**11***	2*	3	**15**	**23***	**1***	2*	4	**10**	3	6	1	6	7	9	4	10	1*	**9***	6	899
2	19	Brad Keselowski	Tyler Reddick	1*	5	5	13	4	1	11	8	3	6	3	3	9	8	19	2	15	7	5	5	5	5	3	884
3	88	Rhonda Thorson	Matt Crafton	8	1*	2	1	3	5	1*	21	4	1	9	28	**6**	7	2	14	2	**8***	24*	1	**4**	23	**1**	877
4	98	Mike Curb	Johnny Sauter	10	6	4	3	15	9	4	3	17	12	22	6	4	9	6	5*	3	12	7	9	13	25	7	809
5	17	Tom Deloach	Timothy Peters	24	9	18	4	7	20	21	6	6	5	23	7	8	12	22	3	4	2	**1**	6	6	1	5	804
6	8	Sidney Mauldin	Joe Nemechek	20	10			11		6																	802
6	8	Sidney Mauldin	John Hunter Nemechek			29			22		4	23	11	7	13	12	3	9	1	5	4	11	2	11	2	2	802
6	8	Sidney Mauldin	Ryan Newman				2																				802
7	51	Kyle Busch	Daniel Suárez	9	4	6	6		2	2			4				30		4				16	2	4	30	774
7	51	Kyle Busch	Matt Tifft					8			25			21				23			19	23					774
7	51	Kyle Busch	Christopher Bell									5															774
7	51	Kyle Busch	Kyle Busch												1*	1*				11							774
8	13	Rhonda Thorson	Cameron Hayley **(R)**	23	14	11	5	14	21	7	5	19	9	8	4	10	18	7	16	12	10	6	3	10	11	9	766
9	29	Brad Keselowski	Austin Theriault	4			14			5	10	12							13	8	31					12	755
9	29	Brad Keselowski	Brad Keselowski		15			5						28	30												755
9	29	Brad Keselowski	Joey Logano			**1***																					755
9	29	Brad Keselowski	Ryan Blaney						**7**				3			2	1							3			755
9	29	Brad Keselowski	Alex Tagliani															**5**									755
9	29	Brad Keselowski	Brian Keselowski																			17					755
9	29	Brad Keselowski	Austin Cindric																				25		14		755
10	14	Bob Newberry	Daniel Hemric **(R)**	26	19	12	10	17	4	9	9	8	18	5	9	7	4	4	25	6	6	28	12	14	21	6	733
11	05	Tony Townley	John Wes Townley	22	12	8	12	6	18	3	11	10	8	14	17	17	11	25	10	26	1	16	11	17	3	10	730
12	33	Maurice J. Gallagher Jr.	Ty Dillon	**11**	2									10													719
12	33	Maurice J. Gallagher Jr.	Brandon Jones			15	30	13	8	22	12	2	10				5	26	17		5	2	7	7	32	31	719
12	33	Maurice J. Gallagher Jr.	Austin Dillon												5	5				**1***							719
13	54	Kyle Busch	Justin Boston **(R)**	29	16	10	7	9	25	8	27	11															712
13	54	Kyle Busch	Christopher Bell										17	1*							14	13		8		25	712
13	54	Kyle Busch	Matt Tifft												8				9						8		712
13	54	Kyle Busch	Cody Coughlin													20											712
13	54	Kyle Busch	Kyle Busch														**2**										712
13	54	Kyle Busch	Gray Gaulding															11		10			21				712
14	11	Tom Deloach	Ben Kennedy	28	**3**	19	26	16	6	10	7	13	16	12	11	25	15	3	12	23	3	25	14	9	24	4	690
15	23	Maurice J. Gallagher Jr.	Spencer Gallagher **(R)**	21	13	14	17	10	12	12	2	7	24	17	14	16	22	8	8	28	15	18	29	12	6	11	677
Pos.	No.	Car Owner	Driver	DAY	ATL	MAR	KAN	CLT	DOV	TEX	GTW	IOW	KEN	ELD	POC	MCH	BRI	MSP	CHI	NHA	LVS	TAL	MAR	TEX	PHO	HOM	Points
Pos.	No.	Car Owner	Driver	Races																							Points

=== Manufacturers' championship ===
Pos	Manufacturer	Wins	Points
1	Toyota	14	1049
2	Chevrolet	5	973
3	Ford	4	944
4	Ram	0	26

== See also ==
- 2015 NASCAR Sprint Cup Series
- 2015 NASCAR Xfinity Series
- 2015 NASCAR K&N Pro Series East
- 2015 NASCAR K&N Pro Series West
- 2015 NASCAR Whelen Modified Tour
- 2015 NASCAR Whelen Southern Modified Tour
- 2015 NASCAR Canadian Tire Series
- 2015 NASCAR Mexico Series
- 2015 NASCAR Whelen Euro Series
