= 2014 Mudsummer Classic =

Tenth race of the 2014 NASCAR Camping World Truck Series

Race details
- Race 10 of 22 of the 2014 NASCAR Camping World Truck Series
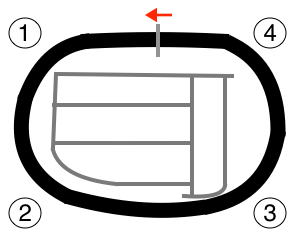
- Date: July 23, 2014
- Official name: Second Annual Mudsummer Classic
- Location: Rossburg, Ohio, Eldora Speedway
- Course: Permanent racing facility
- Course length: 0.500 miles (0.804 km)
- Distance: 150 laps, 75 mi (121 km)
- Scheduled distance: 150 laps, 75 mi (121 km)
- Average speed: 50.195 mph (80.781 km/h)

Pole position
Driver	Erik Jones	Kyle Busch Motorsports
- Time: 19.913

Most laps led
Driver	Bubba Wallace	Kyle Busch Motorsports
- Laps: 97

Winner
No. 54	Bubba Wallace	Kyle Busch Motorsports

Television in the United States
- Network: Fox Sports 1
- Announcers: Rick Allen, Phil Parsons, Michael Waltrip

The 2014 Mudsummer Classic was the tenth stock car race of the 2014 NASCAR Camping World Truck Series and the second iteration of the event. The race was held on July 23, 2014, in Rossburg, Ohio at Eldora Speedway, a 0.500 miles (0.805 km) permanent oval dirt track. The race was run over 150 laps. Bubba Wallace of Kyle Busch Motorsports would win the race, after dominating and leading 97 laps. This was Wallace's third career win in the truck series, and his second of the season. To fill out the podium, Ron Hornaday Jr. of Turner Scott Motorsports and Ryan Blaney of Brad Keselowski Racing would finish 2nd and 3rd, respectively.

== Background ==
Eldora Speedway (nicknamed "The Big E", "Auto Racing's Showcase Since 1954," and "The World's Greatest Dirt Track") is a 0.5 mi (804.672 m) high-banked clay dirt oval. Located north of Rossburg, Ohio in the village of New Weston, Ohio, it features permanent and festival-style seating believed to be in the range of 30,000. The 22,000 permanent grandstand and VIP suite seats make it the largest sports stadium in the Dayton, Ohio-region according to the Dayton Business Journal.

=== Entry list ===
#	Driver	Team	Make
0	Joe Cobb	Jennifer Jo Cobb Racing	RAM
02	Tyler Young (R)	Young's Motorsports	Chevrolet
2	Austin Dillon (i)	Richard Childress Racing	Chevrolet
03	Mike Affarano	Mike Affarano Motorsports	Chevrolet
3	Ty Dillon (i)	Richard Childress Racing	Chevrolet
05	John Wes Townley	Athenian Motorsports	Toyota
6	Norm Benning	Norm Benning Racing	Chevrolet
07	Jared Landers**	SS-Green Light Racing	Chevrolet
08	Korbin Forrister	SS-Green Light Racing	Chevrolet
8	John Hunter Nemechek	NEMCO Motorsports	Toyota
9	Chase Pistone (R)	NTS Motorsports	Chevrolet
10	Jennifer Jo Cobb	Jennifer Jo Cobb Racing	RAM
13	Jeb Burton	ThorSport Racing	Toyota
14	Michael Annett (i)	NTS Motorsports	Chevrolet
17	Timothy Peters	Red Horse Racing	Toyota
19	Tyler Reddick (R)	Brad Keselowski Racing	Ford
20	Gray Gaulding (R)	NTS Motorsports	Chevrolet
21	Joey Coulter	GMS Racing	Chevrolet
29	Ryan Blaney	Brad Keselowski Racing	Ford
30	Ron Hornaday Jr.	Turner Scott Motorsports	Chevrolet
31	Ben Kennedy (R)	Turner Scott Motorsports	Chevrolet
32	Kyle Larson (i)	Turner Scott Motorsports	Chevrolet
35	Mason Mingus (R)	Win-Tron Racing	Toyota
50	T. J. Bell	MAKE Motorsports	Chevrolet
51	Erik Jones	Kyle Busch Motorsports	Toyota
52	Ken Schrader	Ken Schrader Racing	Toyota
54	Bubba Wallace	Kyle Busch Motorsports	Toyota
63	J. R. Heffner	MB Motorsports	Chevrolet
77	Germán Quiroga	Red Horse Racing	Toyota
80	Jody Knowles	Jacob Wallace Racing	Ford
82	Cody Erickson	Empire Racing	Chevrolet
88	Matt Crafton	ThorSport Racing	Toyota
98	Johnny Sauter	ThorSport Racing	Toyota
99	Bryan Silas	T3R2	Ford
Official entry list

** - Withdrew prior to the event.

== Practice ==
=== First practice ===
The first 60-minute practice session was held on July 23, 2014, at 10:00 AM CST. Erik Jones of Kyle Busch Motorsports would set the fastest time in the session, with a time of 19.835 seconds and a speed of 90.749 mph (146.046 km/h).

Pos.	#	Driver	Team	Make	Time	Speed
1	51	Erik Jones	Kyle Busch Motorsports	Toyota	19.835	90.749
2	35	Mason Mingus (R)	Win-Tron Racing	Toyota	19.856	90.653
3	88	Matt Crafton	ThorSport Racing	Toyota	19.951	90.221
Full first practice results

=== Final practice ===
The final 130-minute practice session was held on Wednesday, July 23, at 11:30 AM CST. Ryan Blaney of Brad Keselowski Racing would set the fastest time in the session, with a time of 20.485 seconds and a speed of 87.869 mph (141.411 km/h).

Pos.	#	Driver	Team	Make	Time	Speed
1	29	Ryan Blaney	Brad Keselowski Racing	Ford	20.485	87.869
2	35	Mason Mingus (R)	Win-Tron Racing	Toyota	20.508	87.771
3	2	Austin Dillon (i)	Richard Childress Racing	Chevrolet	20.549	87.596
Full final practice results

== Qualifying ==
Qualifying was held on Wednesday, July 23, at 5:10 PM CST. Since Eldora Speedway is a dirt track, the qualifying system used is a single-car, two-lap system with only one round. Whoever sets the fastest time in the round wins the pole.

Erik Jones of Kyle Busch Motorsports scored the pole for the race, with a time of 19.913 seconds and a speed of 90.393 mph (145.473 km/h).

Pos.	#	Driver	Team	Make	Time	Speed
1	51	Erik Jones	Kyle Busch Motorsports	Toyota	19.913	90.393
2	35	Mason Mingus (R)	Win-Tron Racing	Toyota	19.931	90.312
3	30	Ron Hornaday Jr.	Turner Scott Motorsports	Chevrolet	20.025	89.888
4	88	Matt Crafton	ThorSport Racing	Toyota	20.099	89.557
5	52	Ken Schrader*	Ken Schrader Racing	Toyota	20.110	89.508
6	54	Bubba Wallace	Kyle Busch Motorsports	Toyota	20.129	89.423
7	13	Jeb Burton	ThorSport Racing	Toyota	20.132	89.410
8	9	Chase Pistone (R)	NTS Motorsports	Chevrolet	20.155	89.308
9	17	Timothy Peters	Red Horse Racing	Toyota	20.213	89.052
10	99	Bryan Silas	T3R2	Ford	20.218	89.030
11	32	Kyle Larson (i)	Turner Scott Motorsports	Chevrolet	20.278	88.766
12	05	John Wes Townley*	Athenian Motorsports	Toyota	20.283	88.744
13	19	Tyler Reddick (R)	Brad Keselowski Racing	Ford	20.318	88.591
14	29	Ryan Blaney	Brad Keselowski Racing	Ford	20.356	88.426
15	02	Tyler Young (R)*	Young's Motorsports	Chevrolet	20.391	88.274
16	80	Jody Knowles*	Jacob Wallace Racing	Ford	20.438	88.071
17	21	Joey Coulter	GMS Racing	Chevrolet	20.441	88.058
18	8	John Hunter Nemechek	NEMCO Motorsports	Toyota	20.500	87.805
19	2	Austin Dillon (i)*	Richard Childress Racing	Chevrolet	20.545	87.613
20	98	Johnny Sauter	ThorSport Racing	Toyota	20.568	87.515
21	31	Ben Kennedy (R)	Turner Scott Motorsports	Chevrolet	20.571	87.502
22	20	Gray Gaulding (R)	NTS Motorsports	Chevrolet	20.572	87.498
23	77	Germán Quiroga	Red Horse Racing	Toyota	20.599	87.383
24	3	Ty Dillon (i)*	Richard Childress Racing	Chevrolet	20.692	86.990
25	63	J. R. Heffner*	MB Motorsports	Chevrolet	20.714	86.898
26	82	Cody Erickson*	Empire Racing	Chevrolet	20.717	86.885
27	14	Michael Annett (i)*	NTS Motorsports	Chevrolet	20.840	86.372
28	08	Korbin Forrister	SS-Green Light Racing	Chevrolet	21.008	85.682
29	6	Norm Benning*	Norm Benning Racing	Chevrolet	21.027	85.604
30	0	Joe Cobb*	Jennifer Jo Cobb Racing	RAM	21.222	84.818
31	03	Mike Affarano*	Mike Affarano Motorsports	Chevrolet	22.116	81.389
32	10	Jennifer Jo Cobb*	Jennifer Jo Cobb Racing	RAM	22.757	79.097
33	50	T. J. Bell	MAKE Motorsports	Chevrolet	—	—
34	07	Jared Landers*	SS-Green Light Racing	Chevrolet	—	—
Official qualifying results

* - Had to qualify on speed.

== Qualifying heat races ==
Drivers will be split into five different heat races, all 10 laps, and their finish will determine the starting lineup. Drivers who finish in the top 5 in each heat will advance into the main event. The remaining drivers will compete in the "last chance" qualifier race, which will be 15 laps, and whoever finishes in the top 5, advances.

=== Race 1 ===
Fin.	St.	#	Driver	Team	Make	Laps	Led	Status
1	1	51	Erik Jones	Kyle Busch Motorsports	Toyota	10	10	Running
2	2	54	Bubba Wallace	Kyle Busch Motorsports	Toyota	10	0	Running
3	3	32	Kyle Larson (i)	Turner Scott Motorsports	Chevrolet	10	0	Running
4	6	63	J. R. Heffner	MB Motorsports	Chevrolet	10	0	Running
5	4	80	Jody Knowles	Jacob Wallace Racing	Ford	10	0	Running
6	5	31	Ben Kennedy (R)	Turner Scott Motorsports	Chevrolet	10	0	Running
7	7	0	Joe Cobb	Jennifer Jo Cobb Racing	RAM	9	0	Running

=== Race 2 ===
Fin.	St.	#	Driver	Team	Make	Laps	Led	Status
1	2	13	Jeb Burton	ThorSport Racing	Toyota	10	10	Running
2	4	21	Joey Coulter	GMS Racing	Chevrolet	10	0	Running
3	1	35	Mason Mingus (R)	Win-Tron Racing	Toyota	10	0	Running
4	5	20	Gray Gaulding (R)	NTS Motorsports	Chevrolet	10	0	Running
5	7	03	Mike Affarano (i)	Mike Affarano Motorsports	Chevrolet	10	0	Running
6	3	05	John Wes Townley	Athenian Motorsports	Toyota	10	0	Running
7	6	82	Cody Erickson	Empire Racing	Chevrolet	10	0	Running

=== Race 3 ===
Fin.	St.	#	Driver	Team	Make	Laps	Led	Status
1	1	30	Ron Hornaday Jr.	Turner Scott Motorsports	Chevrolet	10	10	Running
2	3	19	Tyler Reddick (R)	Brad Keselowski Racing	Ford	10	0	Running
3	5	3	Ty Dillon (i)	Richard Childress Racing	Chevrolet	10	0	Running
4	4	8	John Hunter Nemechek	NEMCO Motorsports	Toyota	10	0	Running
5	6	14	Michael Annett (i)	NTS Motorsports	Chevrolet	10	0	Running
6	2	9	Chase Pistone (R)	NTS Motorsports	Chevrolet	10	0	Running
7	7	10	Jennifer Jo Cobb	Jennifer Jo Cobb Racing	RAM	10	0	Running

=== Race 4 ===
Fin.	St.	#	Driver	Team	Make	Laps	Led	Status
1	3	29	Ryan Blaney	Brad Keselowski Racing	Ford	10	7	Running
2	1	88	Matt Crafton	ThorSport Racing	Toyota	10	3	Running
3	2	17	Timothy Peters	Red Horse Racing	Toyota	10	0	Running
4	4	2	Austin Dillon (i)	Richard Childress Racing	Chevrolet	10	0	Running
5	6	6	Norm Benning	Norm Benning Racing	Chevrolet	10	0	Running
6	5	77	Germán Quiroga	Red Horse Racing	Toyota	10	0	Running
7	7	07	Jared Landers	SS-Green Light Racing	Chevrolet	0	0	Did Not Start

=== Race 5 ===
Fin.	St.	#	Driver	Team	Make	Laps	Led	Status
1	4	98	Johnny Sauter	ThorSport Racing	Toyota	10	5	Running
2	1	52	Ken Schrader	Ken Schrader Racing	Toyota	10	5	Running
3	3	02	Tyler Young (R)	Young's Motorsports	Chevrolet	10	0	Running
4	6	50	T. J. Bell	MAKE Motorsports	Chevrolet	10	0	Running
5	2	99	Bryan Silas	T3R2	Ford	10	0	Running
6	5	08	Korbin Forrister	SS-Green Light Racing	Chevrolet	9	0	Running

=== "Last Chance" qualifier race ===
Fin.	St.	#	Driver	Team	Make	Laps	Led	Status
1	2	05	John Wes Townley	Athenian Motorsports	Toyota	15	13	Running
2	5	02	Tyler Young (R)	Young's Motorsports	Chevrolet	15	0	Running
3	1	80	Jody Knowles	Jacob Wallace Racing	Ford	15	2	Running
4	4	6	Norm Benning	Norm Benning Racing	Chevrolet	15	0	Running
5	3	14	Michael Annett (i)	NTS Motorsports	Chevrolet	15	0	Running
6	7	82	Cody Erickson	Empire Racing	Chevrolet	15	0	Running
7	8	10	Jennifer Jo Cobb	Jennifer Jo Cobb Racing	RAM	15	0	Running
8	6	0	Joe Cobb	Jennifer Jo Cobb Racing	RAM	15	0	Running
9	9	07	Jared Landers	SS-Green Light Racing	Chevrolet	0	0	Did Not Start

=== Starting lineup ===
Pos.	#	Driver	Team	Make
1	51	Erik Jones	Kyle Busch Motorsports	Toyota
2	13	Jeb Burton	ThorSport Racing	Toyota
3	30	Ron Hornaday Jr.	Turner Scott Motorsports	Chevrolet
4	29	Ryan Blaney	Brad Keselowski Racing	Ford
5	98	Johnny Sauter	ThorSport Racing	Toyota
6	54	Bubba Wallace	Kyle Busch Motorsports	Toyota
7	21	Joey Coulter	GMS Racing	Chevrolet
8	19	Tyler Reddick (R)	Brad Keselowski Racing	Ford
9	88	Matt Crafton	ThorSport Racing	Toyota
10	52	Ken Schrader	Ken Schrader Racing	Toyota
11	32	Kyle Larson (i)	Turner Scott Motorsports	Chevrolet
12	35	Mason Mingus (R)	Win-Tron Racing	Toyota
13	3	Ty Dillon (i)	Richard Childress Racing	Chevrolet
14	17	Timothy Peters	Red Horse Racing	Toyota
15	50	T. J. Bell	MAKE Motorsports	Chevrolet
16	63	J. R. Heffner	MB Motorsports	Chevrolet
17	20	Gray Gaulding (R)	NTS Motorsports	Chevrolet
18	8	John Hunter Nemechek	NEMCO Motorsports	Toyota
19	2	Austin Dillon (i)	Richard Childress Racing	Chevrolet
20	99	Bryan Silas	T3R2	Ford
21	31	Ben Kennedy (R)	Turner Scott Motorsports	Chevrolet
22	03	Mike Affarano (i)	Mike Affarano Motorsports	Chevrolet
23	9	Chase Pistone (R)	NTS Motorsports	Chevrolet
24	77	Germán Quiroga	Red Horse Racing	Toyota
25	08	Korbin Forrister	SS-Green Light Racing	Chevrolet
26	05	John Wes Townley	Athenian Motorsports	Toyota
27	02	Tyler Young (R)	Young's Motorsports	Chevrolet
28	80	Jody Knowles	Jacob Wallace Racing	Ford
29	6	Norm Benning	Norm Benning Racing	Chevrolet
30	14	Michael Annett (i)	NTS Motorsports	Chevrolet
Failed to qualify
31	82	Cody Erickson	Empire Racing	Chevrolet
32	10	Jennifer Jo Cobb	Jennifer Jo Cobb Racing	RAM
33	0	Joe Cobb	Jennifer Jo Cobb Racing	RAM
Withdrew
34	07	Jared Landers	SS-Green Light Racing	Chevrolet
Official starting lineup

== Race results ==
Laps: 150

Fin.	St	#	Driver	Team	Make	Laps	Led	Status	Points
1	6	54	Bubba Wallace	Kyle Busch Motorsports	Toyota	150	97	Running	48
2	3	30	Ron Hornaday Jr.	Turner Scott Motorsports	Chevrolet	150	17	Running	43
3	4	29	Ryan Blaney	Brad Keselowski Racing	Ford	150	0	Running	41
4	10	52	Ken Schrader	Ken Schrader Racing	Toyota	150	0	Running	40
5	13	3	Ty Dillon (i)	Richard Childress Racing	Chevrolet	150	0	Running	0
6	18	8	John Hunter Nemechek	NEMCO Motorsports	Toyota	150	0	Running	38
7	2	13	Jeb Burton	ThorSport Racing	Toyota	150	7	Running	38
8	5	98	Johnny Sauter	ThorSport Racing	Toyota	150	0	Running	36
9	9	88	Matt Crafton	ThorSport Racing	Toyota	150	0	Running	35
10	19	2	Austin Dillon (i)	Richard Childress Racing	Chevrolet	150	0	Running	0
11	8	19	Tyler Reddick (R)	Brad Keselowski Racing	Ford	150	0	Running	33
12	24	77	Germán Quiroga	Red Horse Racing	Toyota	150	0	Running	32
13	21	31	Ben Kennedy (R)	Turner Scott Motorsports	Chevrolet	150	0	Running	31
14	7	21	Joey Coulter	GMS Racing	Chevrolet	150	0	Running	30
15	27	02	Tyler Young (R)	Young's Motorsports	Chevrolet	150	0	Running	29
16	14	17	Timothy Peters	Red Horse Racing	Toyota	150	0	Running	28
17	23	9	Chase Pistone (R)	NTS Motorsports	Chevrolet	150	0	Running	27
18	16	63	J. R. Heffner	MB Motorsports	Chevrolet	150	0	Running	26
19	26	05	John Wes Townley	Athenian Motorsports	Toyota	150	0	Running	25
20	17	20	Gray Gaulding (R)	NTS Motorsports	Chevrolet	150	0	Running	24
21	15	50	T. J. Bell	MAKE Motorsports	Chevrolet	150	0	Running	23
22	12	35	Mason Mingus (R)	Win-Tron Racing	Toyota	150	0	Running	22
23	20	99	Bryan Silas	T3R2	Ford	150	0	Running	21
24	25	08	Korbin Forrister	SS-Green Light Racing	Chevrolet	150	0	Running	20
25	30	14	Michael Annett (i)	NTS Motorsports	Chevrolet	149	0	Running	0
26	11	32	Kyle Larson (i)	Turner Scott Motorsports	Chevrolet	148	5	Accident	0
27	29	6	Norm Benning	Norm Benning Racing	Chevrolet	148	0	Running	17
28	28	80	Jody Knowles	Jacob Wallace Racing	Ford	148	0	Running	16
29	1	51	Erik Jones	Kyle Busch Motorsports	Toyota	144	24	Running	16
30	22	03	Mike Affarano (i)	Mike Affarano Motorsports	Chevrolet	93	0	Overheating	0
Official race results
