= 2013 NextEra Energy Resources 250 =

Race details
- Map of Speedway
- Date: February 22, 2013
- Official name: 2013 NextEra Energy Resources 250
- Location: Daytona International Speedway in Daytona Beach, Florida
- Course: Tri-oval
- Course length: 2.5 miles (4.023 km)
- Distance: 100 laps, 250 mi (400 km)
- Weather: Clear
- Average speed: 141.598 mph (227.880 km/h)

Pole position
Driver	Brennan Newberry	NTS Motorsports
- Time: 50.797

Most laps led
Driver	Ty Dillon	Richard Childress Racing
- Laps: 56

Winner
No. 98	Johnny Sauter	ThorSport Racing

Television in the United States
- Network: Speed
- Announcers: Rick Allen, Phil Parsons, Michael Waltrip

The 2013 NextEra Energy Resources 250 was a NASCAR Camping World Truck Series race held at Daytona International Speedway in Daytona Beach, Florida on February 22, 2013. The race the 14th iteration of the event and the first race of the 2013 NASCAR Camping World Truck Series. Rookie Brennan Newberry won the pole while Ty Dillon led the most laps. But it was Johnny Sauter who would take home the win, his first at Daytona.

== Background ==
Daytona International Speedway is a race track in Daytona Beach, Florida, United States. Since opening in 1959, it has been the home of the Daytona 500, the most prestigious race in NASCAR as well as its season opening event. In addition to NASCAR, the track also hosts races for ARCA, AMA Superbike, IMSA, SCCA, and Motocross. The track features multiple layouts including the primary 2.500 mi (4.023 km) high-speed tri-oval, a 3.560 mi (5.729 km) sports car course, a 2.950 mi (4.748 km) motorcycle course, and a 1,320 ft (402.3 m) karting and motorcycle flat-track. The track's 180-acre (72.8 ha) infield includes the 29-acre (11.7 ha) Lake Lloyd, which has hosted powerboat racing. The speedway is operated by NASCAR pursuant to a lease with the City of Daytona Beach on the property that runs until 2054. Dale Earnhardt is Daytona International Speedway's all-time winningest driver, with a total of 34 career victories (12- Daytona 500 Qualifying Races) (7- NASCAR Xfinity Series Races) (6- Busch Clash Races) (6- IROC Races) (2- Pepsi 400 July Races) (1- The 1998 Daytona 500).

=== Entry list ===
- (R) denotes rookie driver
- (i) denotes driver who is ineligible for series driver points

#	Driver	Team	Make
1	Dusty Davis	Rick Ware Racing	Chevrolet
3	Ty Dillon	Richard Childress Racing	Chevrolet
4	Jeb Burton (R)	Turner Scott Motorsports	Chevrolet
5	Tim George Jr.	Wauters Motorsports	Ford
6	Justin Lofton	Eddie Sharp Racing	Chevrolet
07	Chris Cockrum	SS-Green Light Racing	Toyota
7	John Wes Townley	Red Horse Racing	Toyota
8	Max Gresham	Eddie Sharp Racing	Chevrolet
9	Ron Hornaday Jr.	NTS Motorsports	Chevrolet
10	Jennifer Jo Cobb	Jennifer Jo Cobb Racing	Chevrolet
13	Todd Bodine	ThorSport Racing	Toyota
14	Brennan Newberry (R)	NTS Motorsports	Chevrolet
17	Timothy Peters	Red Horse Racing	Toyota
18	Joey Coulter	Kyle Busch Motorsports	Toyota
19	Ross Chastain	Brad Keselowski Racing	Ford
27	Jeff Agnew	Hillman Racing	Chevrolet
29	Ryan Blaney (R)	Brad Keselowski Racing	Ford
30	Ryan Truex	Turner Scott Motorsports	Chevrolet
31	James Buescher	Turner Scott Motorsports	Chevrolet
32	Miguel Paludo	Turner Scott Motorsports	Chevrolet
33	John King	Eddie Sharp Racing	Chevrolet
39	Ryan Sieg	RSS Racing	Chevrolet
50	Rick Crawford	MAKE Motorsports	Chevrolet
51	Kyle Busch (i)	Kyle Busch Motorsports	Toyota
54	Bubba Wallace (R)	Kyle Busch Motorsports	Toyota
57	Norm Benning	Norm Benning Racing	Chevrolet
60	Dakoda Armstrong	Turn One Racing	Chevrolet
62	Brendan Gaughan	Richard Childress Racing	Chevrolet
63	Scott Stenzel	MB Motorsports	Ford
68	Clay Greenfield	Clay Greenfield Motorsports	Ram
77	Germán Quiroga (R)	Red Horse Racing	Toyota
81	David Starr	SS-Green Light Racing	Toyota
82	Sean Corr	Empire Racing	Ford
84	Chris Fontaine	Glenden Enterprises	Toyota
88	Matt Crafton	ThorSport Racing	Toyota
92	Scott Riggs	RBR Enterprises	Chevrolet
93	Jason White (i)	RSS Racing	Chevrolet
98	Johnny Sauter	ThorSport Racing	Toyota
99	Bryan Silas	T3R2 Racing	Ford
Official Entry list

== Qualifying ==
Rookie Brennan Newberry won the pole for the race with a time of 50.797 and a speed of 177.176 mph.

Grid	No.	Driver	Team	Manufacturer	Time	Speed
1	14	Brennan Newberry (R)	NTS Motorsports	Chevrolet	50.797	177.176
2	6	Justin Lofton	Eddie Sharp Racing	Chevrolet	50.915	176.765
3	31	James Buescher	Turner Scott Motorsports	Chevrolet	50.919	176.751
4	9	Ron Hornaday	NTS Motorsports	Chevrolet	50.930	176.713
5	3	Ty Dillon	Richard Childress Racing	Chevrolet	50.952	176.637
6	51	Kyle Busch (i)	Kyle Busch Motorsports	Toyota	50.997	176.481
7	4	Jeb Burton (R)	Turner Scott Motorsports	Chevrolet	50.999	176.474
8	32	Miguel Paludo	Turner Scott Motorsports	Chevrolet	51.151	175.950
9	30	Ryan Truex	Turner Scott Motorsports	Chevrolet	51.196	175.795
10	18	Joey Coulter	Kyle Busch Motorsports	Toyota	51.205	175.764
11	29	Ryan Blaney (R)	Brad Keselowski Racing	Ford	51.210	175.747
12	8	Max Gresham	Eddie Sharp Racing	Chevrolet	51.214	175.733
13	60	Dakoda Armstrong	Turn One Racing	Chevrolet	51.227	175.689
14	54	Bubba Wallace (R)	Kyle Busch Motorsports	Toyota	51.292	175.466
15	62	Brendan Gaughan	Richard Childress Racing	Chevrolet	51.293	175.463
16	19	Ross Chastain	Brad Keselowski Racing	Ford	51.406	175.077
17	88	Matt Crafton	ThorSport Racing	Toyota	51.548	174.595
18	92	Scott Riggs	RBR Enterprises	Chevrolet	51.571	174.517
19	68	Clay Greenfield	Clay Greenfield Motorsports	Ram	51.573	174.510
20	77	Germán Quiroga (R)	Red Horse Racing	Toyota	51.621	174.348
21	33	John King	Eddie Sharp Racing	Chevrolet	51.624	174.338
22	84	Chris Fontaine	Glenden Enterprises	Toyota	51.639	174.287
23	17	Timothy Peters	Red Horse Racing	Toyota	51.668	174.189
24	5	Tim George Jr.	Wauters Motorsports	Ford	51.724	174.000
25	98	Johnny Sauter**	ThorSport Racing	Toyota	51.793	173.769
26	13	Todd Bodine*	ThorSport Racing	Toyota	51.802	173.738
27	99	Bryan Silas	T3R2 Racing	Ford	51.872	173.504
28	7	John Wes Townley	Red Horse Racing	Toyota	51.915	173.360
29	93	Jason White (i)	RSS Racing	Chevrolet	52.178	172.486
30	27	Jeff Agnew	Hillman Racing	Chevrolet	52.234	172.302
31	39	Ryan Sieg	RSS Racing	Chevrolet	52.374	171.841
32	57	Norm Benning	Norm Benning Racing	Chevrolet	52.464	171.546
33	07	Chris Cockrum*	SS-Green Light Racing	Toyota	52.629	171.008
34	81	David Starr* **	SS-Green Light Racing	Toyota	52.935	170.020
35	10	Jennifer Jo Cobb*	Jennifer Jo Cobb Racing	Chevrolet	53.539	168.102
36	1	Dusty Davis	Rick Ware Racing	Chevrolet	52.237	172.292
Failed to Qualify, withdrew, or driver changes
37	82	Sean Corr	Empire Racing	Ford	52.267	172.193
38	50	Rick Crawford	MAKE Motorsports	Chevrolet	52.587	171.145
39	63	Scott Stenzel	MB Motorsports	Ford	53.195	169.189
Official Starting grid

* – Made the field via owners points

** – Johnny Sauter and David Starr had to start at the rear of the field. Both had adjustments outside impound.

== Race ==
Outside pole sitter Justin Lofton took the lead from pole sitter Brennan Newberry and Lofton led the first lap of the race. On lap 7, Ty Dillon took the lead with a push from James Buescher. On lap 18, Buescher attempted to take the lead from Dillon and led that lap but couldn't get in front of Dillon. The first caution flew on lap 26 for debris. Ty Dillon won the race off of pit road and he led the field to the restart on lap 30. On lap 54, the big one would occur in turn 3 bringing out the second caution of the race. It started when Brendan Gaughan tried to go through the middle of Germán Quiroga and Brennan Newberry but ended up making contact with the two and Quiroga, Gaughan, and Newberry went into the outside wall in turn 3 triggering the crash. The wreck collected 15 trucks. The wreck collected Chris Cockrum, Jeb Burton, Tim George Jr., Max Gresham, Brennan Newberry, Jeff Agnew, Ryan Truex, John King, Norm Benning, Dakoda Armstrong, Brendan Gaughan, Germán Quiroga, Chris Fontaine, Jason White, and Bryan Silas.

=== Final laps ===
Ty Dillon won the race off of pit road and he led the field to the restart with 40 laps to go. On the restart, Johnny Sauter took the lead from Dillon. With 39 to go, Dillon took the lead back from Sauter. With 38 to go, the third caution flew when Jason White crashed in turn 4. Todd Bodine was the new leader and Bodine led the field to the restart with 33 laps to go. With 32 to go, Kyle Busch took the lead but Bodine immeadietly took it back with 31 to go. With 27 to go, Kyle Busch took the lead after Bodine almost wrecked in the tri-oval. With 23 to go, the 4th caution flew when Jennifer Jo Cobb's engine blew. The race would restart with 19 laps to go. With 16 to go, Johnny Sauter took the lead with a push from Todd Bodine. With 9 to go, the 5th caution flew for a 5 truck crash in turn 3. It started when Ryan Truex spun after having a flat tire and Truex collected John Wes Townley, Timothy Peters, Ross Chastain, and Ryan Sieg. The race would restart with 5 laps to go. Sauter held on to the lead with Kyle Busch waiting to pounce on him for the lead. As soon as they took the white flag, Jeff Agnew got turned by James Buescher and Agnew spun up into Joey Coulter, Max Gresham, and John King bringing out the 6th and final caution of the race. Sauter was in front when the caution flew and Johnny Sauter won his first ever race at Daytona and Kyle Busch finished in second. Ron Hornaday, Justin Lofton, and Jeb Burton rounded out the top 5 while Ty Dillon, Miguel Paludo, Ryan Blaney, Matt Crafton, and Ryan Sieg rounded out the top 10.

== Race results ==
Pos	Car	Driver	Team	Manufacturer	Laps Run	Laps Led	Status	Points
1	98	Johnny Sauter	ThorSport Racing	Toyota	100	17	running	47
2	51	Kyle Busch (i)	Kyle Busch Motorsports	Toyota	100	12	running	0
3	9	Ron Hornaday	NTS Motorsports	Chevrolet	100	0	running	41
4	6	Justin Lofton	Eddie Sharp Racing	Chevrolet	100	6	running	41
5	4	Jeb Burton (R)	Turner Scott Motorsports	Chevrolet	100	0	running	39
6	3	Ty Dillon	Richard Childress Racing	Chevrolet	100	56	running	40
7	32	Miguel Paludo	Turner Scott Motorsports	Chevrolet	100	0	running	37
8	29	Ryan Blaney (R)	Brad Keselowski Racing	Ford	100	0	running	36
9	88	Matt Crafton	ThorSport Racing	Toyota	100	0	running	35
10	39	Ryan Sieg	RSS Racing	Chevrolet	100	0	running	34
11	13	Todd Bodine	ThorSport Racing	Toyota	100	8	running	34
12	54	Bubba Wallace (R)	Kyle Busch Motorsports	Toyota	100	0	running	32
13	31	James Buescher	Turner Scott Motorsports	Chevrolet	100	1	running	32
14	19	Ross Chastain	Brad Keselowski Racing	Ford	100	0	running	30
15	07	Chris Cockrum	SS-Green Light Racing	Toyota	100	0	running	29
16	5	Tim George Jr.	Wauters Motorsports	Ford	100	0	running	28
17	57	Norm Benning	Norm Benning Racing	Chevrolet	100	0	running	27
18	33	John King	Eddie Sharp Racing	Chevrolet	100	0	running	26
19	60	Dakoda Armstrong	Turn One Racing	Chevrolet	100	0	running	25
20	1	Dusty Davis	Rick Ware Racing	Chevrolet	100	0	running	24
21	7	John Wes Townley	Red Horse Racing	Toyota	100	0	running	23
22	18	Joey Coulter	Kyle Busch Motorsports	Chevrolet	100	0	running	22
23	27	Jeff Agnew	Hillman Racing	Chevrolet	99	0	crash	21
24	8	Max Gresham	Eddie Sharp Racing	Chevrolet	99	0	crash	20
25	77	Germán Quiroga (R)	Red Horse Racing	Toyota	97	0	running	19
26	68	Clay Greenfield	Clay Greenfield Motorsports	Ram	95	0	running	18
27	17	Timothy Peters	Red Horse Racing	Toyota	92	0	crash	17
28	30	Ryan Truex	Turner Scott Motorsports	Chevrolet	91	0	crash	16
29	62	Brendan Gaughan	Richard Childress Racing	Chevrolet	74	0	running	15
30	93	Jason White (i)	RSS Racing	Chevrolet	61	0	crash	0
31	81	David Starr	SS-Green Light Racing	Toyota	58	0	suspension	13
32	99	Bryan Silas	T3R2 Racing	Ford	54	0	crash	12
33	14	Brennan Newberry (R)	NTS Motorsports	Chevrolet	54	0	crash	11
34	84	Chris Fontaine	Glenden Enterprises	Toyota	52	0	crash	10
35	10	Jennifer Jo Cobb	Jennifer Jo Cobb Racing	Chevrolet	37	0	engine	9
36	92	Scott Riggs	RBR Enterprises	Chevrolet	25	0	engine	8
Official Race results

Previous race: 2012 Ford EcoBoost 200	NASCAR Camping World Truck Series; 2013 season	Next race: 2013 Kroger 250
