= 2015 Kroger 250 =

3rd race of the 2015 NASCAR Camping World Truck Series

Race details
- Race 3 of 23 of the 2015 NASCAR Camping World Truck Series
- Date: March 28, 2015
- Official name: 17th Annual Kroger 250
- Location: Martinsville Speedway, Ridgeway, Virginia
- Course: Permanent racing facility
- Course length: 0.526 miles (0.847 km)
- Distance: 258 laps, 135 mi (218 km)
- Scheduled distance: 250 laps, 131 mi (211 km)
- Average speed: 140.711 mph (226.452 km/h)

Pole position
Driver	Joey Logano	Brad Keselowski Racing
- Time: 19.504

Most laps led
Driver	Joey Logano	Brad Keselowski Racing
- Laps: 150

Winner
No. 29	Joey Logano	Brad Keselowski Racing

Television in the United States
- Network: FS1
- Announcers: Adam Alexander, Phil Parsons, and Michael Waltrip

Radio in the United States
- Radio: MRN

The 2015 Kroger 250 was the 3rd stock car race of the 2015 NASCAR Camping World Truck Series, and the 17th iteration of the event. The race was held on Saturday, March 28, 2015, in Ridgeway, Virginia at Martinsville Speedway, a 0.526 mile (0.847 km) permanent paper-clip shaped short track. The race was originally scheduled to be contested over 250 laps, but was increased to 258 laps, due to a NASCAR overtime finish. Joey Logano, driving for Brad Keselowski Racing, would hold off Matt Crafton on the final restart, and would earn his first career NASCAR Camping World Truck Series win. Logano would also become the 26th driver to win a race in all three of NASCAR's national series. Logano and Crafton would dominate the entire race, leading 150 and 100 laps, respectively. To fill out the podium, Crafton, driving for ThorSport Racing, and Erik Jones, driving for Kyle Busch Motorsports, would finish 2nd and 3rd, respectively.

== Background ==
The layout of Martinsville Speedway, the circuit where the race was held.

Martinsville Speedway is a NASCAR-owned stock car racing short track in Ridgeway, Virginia, just south of Martinsville. At 0.526 miles (847 m) in length, it is the shortest track in the NASCAR Cup Series. The track was also one of the first paved oval tracks in stock car racing, being built in 1947 by partners H. Clay Earles, Henry Lawrence, and Sam Rice, nearly a year before NASCAR was officially formed. It is also the only race track that has been on the NASCAR circuit from its beginning in 1948. Along with this, Martinsville is the only oval track on the NASCAR circuit to have asphalt surfaces on the straightaways and concrete to cover the turns.

=== Entry list ===
- (R) denotes rookie driver.
- (i) denotes driver who is ineligible for series driver points.

#	Driver	Team	Make
00	Cole Custer	JR Motorsports	Chevrolet
1	Travis Kvapil	MAKE Motorsports	Chevrolet
02	Tyler Young	Young's Motorsports	Chevrolet
4	Erik Jones (R)	Kyle Busch Motorsports	Toyota
05	John Wes Townley	Athenian Motorsports	Chevrolet
6	Norm Benning	Norm Benning Racing	Chevrolet
07	Ray Black Jr. (R)	SS-Green Light Racing	Chevrolet
7	Gray Gaulding	Red Horse Racing	Toyota
08	Korbin Forrister (R)	BJMM with SS-Green Light Racing	Chevrolet
8	John Hunter Nemechek (R)	SWM-NEMCO Motorsports	Chevrolet
10	Jennifer Jo Cobb	Jennifer Jo Cobb Racing	Chevrolet
11	Ben Kennedy	Red Horse Racing	Toyota
13	Cameron Hayley (R)	ThorSport Racing	Toyota
14	Daniel Hemric (R)	NTS Motorsports	Chevrolet
15	Mason Mingus	Billy Boat Motorsports	Chevrolet
17	Timothy Peters	Red Horse Racing	Toyota
19	Tyler Reddick	Brad Keselowski Racing	Ford
23	Spencer Gallagher (R)	GMS Racing	Chevrolet
25	Matt Tifft	Venturini Motorsports	Toyota
29	Joey Logano (i)	Brad Keselowski Racing	Ford
31	James Buescher	NTS Motorsports	Chevrolet
33	Brandon Jones (R)	GMS Racing	Chevrolet
35	Tommy Regan	B. J. McLeod Motorsports	Chevrolet
50	Cody Ware	MAKE Motorsports	Chevrolet
51	Daniel Suárez (i)	Kyle Busch Motorsports	Toyota
54	Justin Boston (R)	Kyle Busch Motorsports	Toyota
63	Jake Griffin	MB Motorsports	Chevrolet
74	Paige Decker	Mike Harmon Racing	Chevrolet
75	Caleb Holman	Henderson Motorsports	Chevrolet
86	Brandon Brown	Brandonbilt Motorsports	Chevrolet
87	Chuck Buchanan Jr.	Charles Buchanan Racing	Ford
88	Matt Crafton	ThorSport Racing	Toyota
92	David Gilliland (i)	RBR Enterprises	Ford
94	Wendell Chavous	Premium Motorsports	Chevrolet
98	Johnny Sauter	ThorSport Racing	Toyota
99	Bryan Silas	T3R2	Chevrolet
Official entry list

== Practice ==
The first and only practice session was held on Friday, March 27, at 3:00 PM EST, and would last for 2 hours and 30 minutes. Cole Custer, driving for JR Motorsports, would set the fastest time in the session, with a lap of 19.711, and an average speed of 96.068 mph (154.606 km/h). Three practice sessions were scheduled to take place, but due to constant rain showers, only one lengthy session was run.

Pos.	#	Driver	Team	Make	Time	Speed
1	00	Cole Custer	JR Motorsports	Chevrolet	19.711	96.068
2	13	Cameron Hayley (R)	ThorSport Racing	Toyota	19.803	95.622
3	98	Johnny Sauter	ThorSport Racing	Toyota	19.822	95.530
Full first practice results

== Qualifying ==
Qualifying was held on Saturday, March 28, at 11:15 AM EST. The qualifying system used is a multi car, multi lap, three round system where in the first round, everyone would set a time to determine positions 25–32. Then, the fastest 24 qualifiers would move on to the second round to determine positions 13–24. Lastly, the fastest 12 qualifiers would move on to the third round to determine positions 1–12.

Joey Logano, driving for Brad Keselowski Racing, would win the pole after advancing from the preliminary rounds and setting the fastest time in Round 3, with a lap of 19.504, and an average speed of 97.088 mph (156.248 km/h).

Wendell Chavous, Brandon Brown, Paige Decker, and Chuck Buchanan Jr. would fail to qualify.

=== Full qualifying results ===
Pos.	#	Driver	Team	Make	Time (R1)	Speed (R1)	Time (R2)	Speed (R2)	Time (R3)	Speed (R3)
1	29	Joey Logano (i)	Brad Keselowski Racing	Ford	19.951	94.913	19.839	95.448	19.504	97.088
2	00	Cole Custer	JR Motorsports	Chevrolet	19.986	94.746	19.702	96.112	19.598	96.622
3	13	Cameron Hayley (R)	ThorSport Racing	Toyota	20.080	94.303	19.722	96.015	19.623	96.499
4	4	Erik Jones (R)	Kyle Busch Motorsports	Toyota	20.154	93.957	19.796	95.656	19.652	96.357
5	05	John Wes Townley	Athenian Motorsports	Chevrolet	19.955	94.894	19.777	95.748	19.725	96.000
6	33	Brandon Jones (R)	GMS Racing	Chevrolet	20.046	94.463	19.862	95.338	19.737	95.942
7	19	Tyler Reddick	Brad Keselowski Racing	Ford	19.969	94.827	19.830	95.492	19.755	95.854
8	92	David Gilliland (i)	RBR Enterprises	Ford	20.014	94.614	19.837	95.458	19.782	95.723
9	98	Johnny Sauter	ThorSport Racing	Toyota	20.072	94.340	19.810	95.588	19.801	95.632
10	02	Tyler Young	Young's Motorsports	Chevrolet	20.018	94.595	19.851	95.391	19.858	95.357
11	51	Daniel Suárez (i)	Kyle Busch Motorsports	Toyota	20.034	94.519	19.815	95.564	19.873	95.285
12	7	Gray Gaulding	Red Horse Racing	Toyota	20.134	94.050	19.824	95.521	19.883	95.237
Eliminated in Round 2
13	88	Matt Crafton	ThorSport Racing	Toyota	20.055	94.420	19.866	95.319	–	–
14	14	Daniel Hemric (R)	NTS Motorsports	Chevrolet	20.056	94.416	19.868	95.309	–	–
15	31	James Buescher	NTS Motorsports	Chevrolet	20.150	93.975	19.880	95.252	–	–
16	8	John Hunter Nemechek (R)	SWM-NEMCO Motorsports	Chevrolet	19.980	94.775	19.892	95.194	–	–
17	17	Timothy Peters	Red Horse Racing	Toyota	20.031	94.533	19.896	95.175	–	–
18	23	Spencer Gallagher (R)	GMS Racing	Chevrolet	20.063	94.383	19.898	95.165	–	–
19	25	Matt Tifft	Venturini Motorsports	Toyota	20.018	94.595	19.921	95.055	–	–
20	15	Mason Mingus	Billy Boat Motorsports	Chevrolet	20.148	93.985	19.932	95.003	–	–
21	54	Justin Boston (R)	Kyle Busch Motorsports	Toyota	20.131	94.064	19.949	94.922	–	–
22	11	Ben Kennedy	Red Horse Racing	Toyota	20.163	93.915	20.091	94.251	–	–
23	75	Caleb Holman	Henderson Motorsports	Chevrolet	20.069	94.354	20.159	93.933	–	–
24	63	Jake Griffin	MB Motorsports	Chevrolet	20.213	93.682	20.160	93.929	–	–
Eliminated in Round 1
25	99	Bryan Silas	T3R2	Chevrolet	20.265	93.442	–	–	–	–
26	07	Ray Black Jr. (R)	SS-Green Light Racing	Chevrolet	20.265	93.442	–	–	–	–
27	08	Korbin Forrister (R)	BJMM with SS-Green Light Racing	Chevrolet	20.289	93.331	–	–	–	–
Qualified by owner's points
28	50	Cody Ware	MAKE Motorsports	Chevrolet	20.510	92.326	–	–	–	–
29	6	Norm Benning	Norm Benning Racing	Chevrolet	20.565	92.079	–	–	–	–
30	35	Tommy Regan	B. J. McLeod Motorsports	Chevrolet	20.676	91.584	–	–	–	–
31	10	Jennifer Jo Cobb	Jennifer Jo Cobb Racing	Chevrolet	20.843	90.851	–	–	–	–
Past champion provisional
32	1	Travis Kvapil	MAKE Motorsports	Chevrolet	20.719	91.394	–	–	–	–
Failed to qualify
33	94	Wendell Chavous	Premium Motorsports	Chevrolet	20.560	92.101	–	–	–	–
34	86	Brandon Brown	Brandonbilt Motorsports	Chevrolet	20.901	90.599	–	–	–	–
35	74	Paige Decker	Mike Harmon Racing	Chevrolet	21.009	90.133	–	–	–	–
36	87	Chuck Buchanan Jr.	Charles Buchanan Racing	Ford	22.385	84.592	–	–	–	–
Official qualifying results
Official starting lineup

== Race results ==
Fin	St	#	Driver	Team	Make	Laps	Led	Status	Pts	Winnings
1	1	29	Joey Logano (i)	Brad Keselowski Racing	Ford	258	150	Running	0	$51,336
2	13	88	Matt Crafton	ThorSport Racing	Toyota	258	100	Running	43	$31,542
3	4	4	Erik Jones (R)	Kyle Busch Motorsports	Toyota	258	2	Running	42	$25,488
4	9	98	Johnny Sauter	ThorSport Racing	Toyota	258	0	Running	40	$19,518
5	7	19	Tyler Reddick	Brad Keselowski Racing	Ford	258	0	Running	39	$18,458
6	11	51	Daniel Suárez (i)	Kyle Busch Motorsports	Toyota	258	0	Running	0	$16,574
7	15	31	James Buescher	NTS Motorsports	Chevrolet	258	0	Running	37	$14,158
8	5	05	John Wes Townley	Athenian Motorsports	Chevrolet	258	0	Running	36	$16,352
9	19	25	Matt Tifft	Venturini Motorsports	Toyota	258	0	Running	35	$16,297
10	21	54	Justin Boston (R)	Kyle Busch Motorsports	Toyota	258	0	Running	34	$17,191
11	3	13	Cameron Hayley (R)	ThorSport Racing	Toyota	258	0	Running	33	$16,186
12	14	14	Daniel Hemric (R)	NTS Motorsports	Chevrolet	258	0	Running	32	$16,046
13	26	07	Ray Black Jr. (R)	SS-Green Light Racing	Chevrolet	258	0	Running	31	$15,990
14	18	23	Spencer Gallagher (R)	GMS Racing	Chevrolet	258	0	Running	30	$15,935
15	6	33	Brandon Jones (R)	GMS Racing	Chevrolet	258	0	Running	29	$16,252
16	2	00	Cole Custer	JR Motorsports	Chevrolet	258	2	Running	29	$15,769
17	12	7	Gray Gaulding	Red Horse Racing	Toyota	257	0	Running	27	$13,663
18	17	17	Timothy Peters	Red Horse Racing	Toyota	257	0	Running	26	$15,658
19	22	11	Ben Kennedy	Red Horse Racing	Toyota	257	0	Running	25	$15,602
20	10	02	Tyler Young	Young's Motorsports	Chevrolet	257	0	Running	24	$16,019
21	23	75	Caleb Holman	Henderson Motorsports	Chevrolet	257	0	Running	23	$13,241
22	20	15	Mason Mingus	Billy Boat Motorsports	Chevrolet	256	4	Running	23	$13,213
23	27	08	Korbin Forrister (R)	BJMM with SS-Green Light Racing	Chevrolet	255	0	Running	21	$15,436
24	31	10	Jennifer Jo Cobb	Jennifer Jo Cobb Racing	Chevrolet	250	0	Running	20	$14,130
25	30	35	Tommy Regan	B. J. McLeod Motorsports	Chevrolet	248	0	Running	19	$14,197
26	24	63	Jake Griffin	MB Motorsports	Chevrolet	218	0	Handling	18	$12,992
27	28	50	Cody Ware	MAKE Motorsports	Chevrolet	216	0	Vibration	17	$12,964
28	29	6	Norm Benning	Norm Benning Racing	Chevrolet	174	0	Rear Gear	16	$12,716
29	16	8	John Hunter Nemechek (R)	SWM-NEMCO Motorsports	Chevrolet	173	0	Transmission	15	$12,660
30	8	92	David Gilliland (i)	RBR Enterprises	Ford	132	0	Brakes	0	$12,160
31	25	99	Bryan Silas	T3R2	Chevrolet	120	0	Overheating	13	$10,660
32	32	1	Travis Kvapil	MAKE Motorsports	Chevrolet	83	0	Rear Gear	12	$9,660
Official race results

== Standings after the race ==
Drivers' Championship standings

	Pos	Driver	Points
1	1	Matt Crafton	128
1	2	Tyler Reddick	126 (-2)
	3	Erik Jones	122 (–6)
	4	Johnny Sauter	112 (–16)
	5	James Buescher	100 (–28)
6	6	John Wes Townley	90 (–38)
1	7	Ray Black Jr.	89 (–39)
7	8	Cameron Hayley	84 (–44)
4	9	Spencer Gallagher	84 (–44)
3	10	Ben Kennedy	83 (–45)
Official driver's standings

- Note: Only the first 10 positions are included for the driver standings.

Previous race: 2015 Hyundai Construction Equipment 200	NASCAR Camping World Truck Series; 2015 season	Next race: 2015 Toyota Tundra 250
