= NTS Motorsports =

Auto racing team, United States

- Owner: Bob Newberry
- Base: Kernersville, North Carolina, U.S.
- Series: Camping World Truck Series
- Manufacturer: Chevrolet
- Opened: 2011
- Closed: 2016

Career
- Debut: 2011 NextEra Energy Resources 250 (As Joe Denette Motorsports)
- Latest race: 2016 NextEra Energy Resources 250 (Daytona)
- Races competed: 125
- Drivers' Championships: 0
- Race victories: 0
- Pole positions: 2

NTS Motorsports was an American professional stock car racing team that competed in the NASCAR Camping World Truck Series. The team was owned by Californian Bob Newberry, coming into its current form after Joe Denette Motorsports merged with Newberry's NTS team, both of which originally had support from Kevin Harvick. The team's final race was at Daytona in 2016.

== History ==
=== Joe Denette Motorsports ===
After Thornburg, Virginia native Joe Denette was laid off from his job in 2009, he entered the lottery, buying a "fistfull" of Mega Millions tickets with the initial dream of buying an RV to travel to races each week. Denette matched six numbers in a May 1 drawing and won $75.6 million, taking a lump sum payment of $46 million. With the money, Denette contacted fellow Virginian and former full-time driver Hermie Sadler about starting his own team in the Camping World Truck Series. After consulting with then team owner Kevin Harvick of KHI, Denette founded his own team in 2011, with trucks and support from KHI and engines from Pro Motor Engines. Denette hired Jason White. Coincidentally, Denette bought 23 lottery tickets for his big pay day, and White's sponsor carried the number 23. Hermie's brother and Harvick's Nationwide Series driver Elliott Sadler drove a second truck, the No. 24, for a few races near the end of the season. The team endured some growing pains in 2011; though they scored seven top tens and a pole with Sadler at Bristol, White finished 15th in points. The team fielded both trucks full-time in 2012 with Denette, a long-time Bill Elliott fan, renumbering the 23 truck to No. 9.

=== NTS Motorsports ===
Meanwhile, NTS Motorsports was founded by former driver Bob Newberry, also a friend of Kevin Harvick and his father Mike, in Bakersfield, California, fielding cars for son Brennan in the United States Auto Club, K&N Pro Series West, K&N Pro Series East, and the ARCA Racing Series. Mike Harvick served as the younger Newberry's early crew chief. The team ran part-time in the Truck Series with Newberry in 2011 and 2012.

=== Since 2013: merger ===
In December 2012, JDM merged with NTS, and adopted the latter's name to run the No. 9 truck with Ron Hornaday Jr., the No. 24 truck with Brennan Newberry, and the No. 14 truck with several drivers including Kevin Harvick for the 2013 season. The team moved into Harvick's former KHI facility in Kernersville, NC, with Harvick as an adviser and Bruce Cook as competition director. Hornaday would be released with one race to go in the season.

In 2014, the team expanded to two full-time rides and two part-time rides fielding multiple drivers, including Chase Pistone, Ron Hornaday Jr., Gray Gaulding, Justin Lofton, Austin Dillon, and Brennan Newberry. Dwayne Gaulding was also brought on as the VP of Operations for the team. Newberry was set to run a 12-race truck schedule, while 16-year-old Gaulding competed in 9 races on tracks one mile or shorter. The team also ran two full-time entries in the K&N Pro Series East and a part-time entry in the Nationwide Series with SS-Green Light Racing.

== Camping World Truck Series ==
=== Truck No. 9 history ===
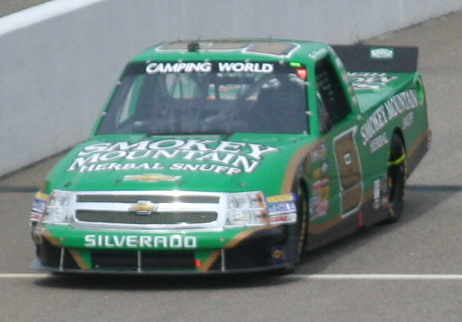
Ron Hornaday Jr. in the No. 9 at Rockingham Speedway in 2013

The 9 truck was the original entry out of Joe Denette Motorsports. It began as the number 23 truck, with Jason White moving over from SS-Green Light Racing. White scored two top fives and five top tens en route to a 15th-place points finish, and would leave with his sponsor to start their own team. In 2012, four-time series champion Ron Hornaday Jr. would be signed to drive the now-9 truck, moving over from the closed KHI operation of mutual friend Kevin Harvick. Coming off a four win season, Hornaday struggled with the young team, posting two top fives and six top tens against three crashes and five total DNFs to finish 13th in points. It was Hornaday's first season without a win and, at the time, his worst finish in points.

Hornaday returned to the 9 truck for the full season in 2013. After nine top 10 finishes but struggles to find regular sponsorship, the team released Hornaday with one race to go in the season. Hornaday ran Turner Scott Motorsports' 34 truck at Homestead, and moved to their 30 truck in 2014. Former KHI driver Nelson Piquet Jr. took over the No. 9 at Homestead.

The 9 truck ran the full season (except the Daytona opener) in 2014. In March, Chase Pistone, grandson of former Sprint Cup Series winner Tom Pistone, was signed to run 14 races in the 9 truck. Pistone ultimately ran five races in the truck, with a best finish of 9th at Gateway. Brennan Newberry ran nine races in the truck, scoring two top tens. Justin Lofton returned to the truck series at Charlotte in the No. 9 truck. Jason White returned to run two races in the truck. In September, it was announced the Ron Hornaday Jr. would return to the 9 truck of NTS, after being released from Turner Scott Motorsports due to internal issues within the organization. Hornaday drove at Las Vegas and Texas with Rheem, and a third race at Talladega. Ty Dillon replaced Newberry for the season finale at Homestead, finishing 7th.

==== Truck No. 9 results ====
Year	Driver	No.	Make	1	2	3	4	5	6	7	8	9	10	11	12	13	14	15	16	17	18	19	20	21	22	23	24	25	Owners	Pts
2011	Jason White	23	Chevy	DAY; 30	PHO; 10	DAR; 33	MAR; 22	NSH; 13	DOV; 14	CLT; 14	KAN; 17	TEX; 16	KEN; 5	IOW; 25	NSH; 12	IRP; 26	POC; 17	MCH; 6	BRI; 16	ATL; 25	CHI; 24	NHA; 17	KEN; 24	LVS; 14	TAL; 5	MAR; 15	TEX; 12	HOM; 9	17th	682
2012	Ron Hornaday Jr.	9	Chevy	DAY; 14	MAR; 16	CAR; 12	KAN; 6	CLT; 5	DOV; 27	TEX; 12	KEN; 9	IOW; 2	CHI; 7	POC; 19	MCH; 17	BRI; 8	ATL; 30	IOW; 33	KEN; 14	LVS; 27	TAL; 28	MAR; 33	TEX; 20	PHO; 22	HOM; 20				15th	591
2013	Ron Hornaday Jr.	9	Chevy	DAY; 3	MAR; 10	CAR; 15	KAN; 9	CLT; 30	DOV; 12	TEX; 12	KEN; 17	IOW; 4	ELD; 28	POC; 6	MCH; 11	BRI; 8	MSP; 5	IOW; 17	CHI; 13	LVS; 6	TAL; 24	MAR; 28	TEX; 3	PHO; 28					13th	650
2013	Nelson Piquet Jr.	9	Chevy																						HOM; 31				13th	650
2014	Chase Pistone	9	Chevy	DAY	MAR; 13					GTW; 9	KEN; 28	IOW; 12	ELD; 17																15th	606
2014	Brennan Newberry	9	Chevy			KAN; 24		DOV; 27	TEX; 16							BRI; 17	MSP; 7	CHI; 13	NHA; 14			MAR; 18		PHO; 16					15th	606
2014	Justin Lofton	9	Chevy				CLT; 10																						15th	606
2014	Jason White	9	Chevy											POC; 11	MCH; 12														15th	606
2014	Ron Hornaday Jr.	9	Chevy																	LVS; 20	TAL; 34		TEX; 12						15th	606
2014	Ty Dillon	9	Chevy																						HOM; 7				15th	606

=== Truck No. 14 history ===
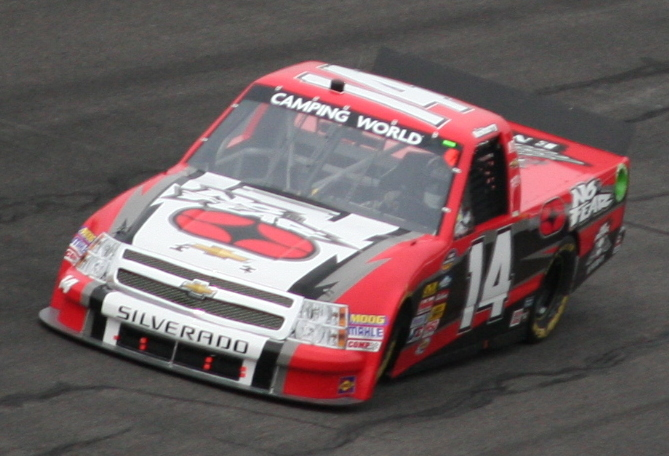
Brennan Newberry in the No. 14 at Rockingham Speedway in 2013

The 14 truck was the original Truck Series effort of Bob Newberry's NTS Motorsports. Son Brennan Newberry attempted the 2011 Truck Series finale at Homestead in the 14 truck, but failed to make the field after qualifying was rained out. Newberry then attempted 12 races in 2012 (withdrawing from Dover and failing to qualify at Martinsville), with 5 crashes and a best finish of 19th. Newberry's driving coach Brandon Miller ran the No. 14 at Texas finishing 20th.

Newberry began the 2013 season in the 14 truck for his rookie season, with Eddie Pardue as crew chief. Newberry won the pole at the season opener at Daytona, but finished 33rd after a crash. After four races, Newberry moved over to the No. 24 truck and the No. 14 scaled back to part-time. Veteran Max Papis drove the 14 at Canadian Tire Motorsport Park. Papis would finish sixth on the road course after a last lap incident with Eddie Sharp Racing driver Mike Skeen, leading the two to quarrel on the cool down lap, and leading Skeens girlfriend to slap Papis on camera for which she received a fine and an indefinite suspension from all NASCAR events. Kevin Harvick ran the 14 truck at the second Martinsville race. Harvick would be involved in an incident with then-teammate Ty Dillon, grandson of RCR owner Richard Childress, while racing for second place, knocking the 14 truck out of the race. Harvick would later mention Ty Dillon and his brother Austin as reasons for his impending departure from the organization after 13 seasons.

In 2014, Sprint Cup Series rookie Michael Annett ran the No. 14 truck at Eldora Speedway. Austin Dillon ran the second to last race of the season.

Daniel Hemric drove the 14 truck full-time in 2015, running for Rookie of the Year. Hemric would finish 7th in points, but would move to Brad Keselowski Racing for 2016.

Scott Lagasse Jr. would make the final start for the team in the 2016 NextEra Energy Resources 250 at Daytona, starting 26th and finishing 9th. The owner points were bought by MAKE Motorsports, which would use them for a race attempt by Natalie Decker at Martinsville. They would fail to qualify, and the points remained unused for the remainder of the season.

==== Truck No. 14 results ====
Year	Driver	No.	Make	1	2	3	4	5	6	7	8	9	10	11	12	13	14	15	16	17	18	19	20	21	22	23	24	25	Owners	Pts
2011	Brennan Newberry	14	Chevy	DAY	PHO	DAR	MAR	NSH	DOV	CLT	KAN	TEX	KEN	IOW	NSH	IRP	POC	MCH	BRI	ATL	CHI	NHA; Wth	KEN	LVS	TAL	MAR	TEX	HOM; DNQ	77th	0
2012	Brennan Newberry	14	Chevy	DAY	MAR; 28	CAR; 23	KAN; 32	CLT; 27	DOV; Wth		KEN; 22	IOW; 36	CHI	POC	MCH; 19	BRI	ATL	IOW; 21	KEN; 27	LVS; 23	TAL	MAR; DNQ	TEX	PHO	HOM				34th	182
2012	Brandon Miller	14	Chevy							TEX; 20																			34th	182
2013	Brennan Newberry	14	Chevy	DAY; 33	MAR; 33	CAR; 21	KAN; 20	CLT	DOV	TEX	KEN	IOW	ELD	POC	MCH	BRI													42nd	72
2013	Max Papis	14	Chevy														MSP; 6	IOW	CHI	LVS	TAL								42nd	72
2013	Kevin Harvick	14	Chevy																			MAR; 30	TEX	PHO	HOM				42nd	72
2014	Michael Annett	14	Chevy	DAY	MAR	KAN	CLT	DOV	TEX	GTW	KEN	IOW	ELD; 25	POC	MCH	BRI	MSP	CHI	NHA	LVS	TAL	MAR	TEX						45th	55
2014	Austin Dillon	14	Chevy																					PHO; 8	HOM				45th	55
2015	Daniel Hemric	14	Chevy	DAY; 26	ATL; 19	MAR; 12	KAN; 10	CLT; 17	DOV; 4	TEX; 9	GTW; 9	IOW; 8	KEN; 18	ELD; 5	POC; 9	MCH; 7	BRI; 4	MSP; 4	CHI; 25	NHA; 6	LVS; 6	TAL; 28	MAR; 12	TEX; 14	PHO; 21	HOM; 8			10th	733
2016	Scott Lagasse Jr.	14	Chevy	DAY; 9	ATL	MAR	KAN	DOV	CLT	TEX	IOW	GTW	KEN	ELD	POC	BRI	MCH	MSP	CHI	NHA	LVS	TAL	MAR	TEX	PHO	HOM			41st	24

=== Truck No. 20 history ===
The 20 truck debuted in 2014. Former Daytona winner John King drove the truck at the season opener. Gray Gaulding ran his part-time schedule in the 20 truck, scoring two top five finishes. Former series champion Austin Dillon made his debut for the team at Kansas in the No. 20 truck, and ran a total of four races with the team. Justin Lofton won a pole at Texas in the 20, finishing second. He would run two more races with a 9th-place finish at Pocono. Daniel Hemric ran the season finale at Homestead, finishing 12th.

Florida native Scott Lagasse Jr. drove the truck at Daytona in February and Homestead in November. Gaulding planned to return for eight races in 2015, but left prior to his first start at Martinsville for Red Horse Racing.

==== Truck No. 20 results ====
Year	Driver	No.	Make	1	2	3	4	5	6	7	8	9	10	11	12	13	14	15	16	17	18	19	20	21	22	23	Owners	Pts
2014	John King	20	Chevy	DAY; 23																							14th	658
2014	Gray Gaulding	20	Chevy		MAR; 19			DOV; 21		GTW; 20			ELD; 20			BRI; 23	MSP; 4		NHA; 16			MAR; 14		PHO; 17			14th	658
2014	Austin Dillon	20	Chevy			KAN; 4	CLT; 7				KEN; 7				MCH; 17			CHI; 3									14th	658
2014	Justin Lofton	20	Chevy						TEX; 2			IOW; 20		POC; 9													14th	658
2014	Jason White	20	Chevy																	LVS; 23							14th	658
2014	Brennan Newberry	20	Chevy																		TAL; 11		TEX; 11				14th	658
2014	Daniel Hemric	20	Chevy																						HOM; 12		14th	658
2015	Scott Lagasse Jr.	20	Chevy	DAY; 3	ATL	MAR	KAN	CLT	DOV	TEX	GTW	IOW	KEN	ELD	POC	MCH	BRI	MSP	CHI	NHA	LVS	TAL	MAR	TEX	PHO		50th	31
2015	Scott Lagasse Jr.	0	Chevy																							HOM; 15	50th	31

=== Truck No. 24 history ===
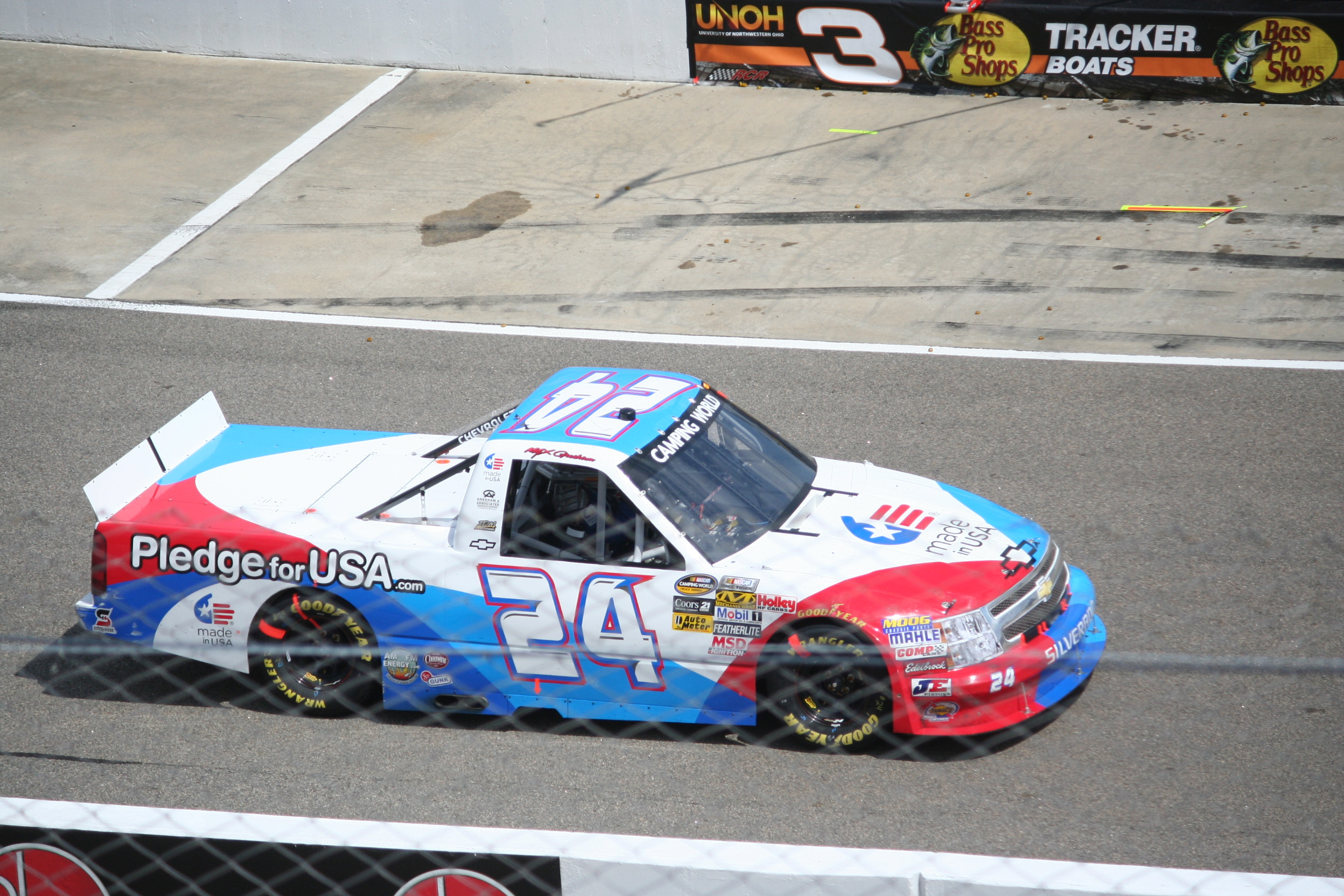
Max Gresham at Rockingham in 2012

The 24 truck debuted in 2011 as the second JDM truck with Elliott Sadler driving. Sadler ran three races, scoring a pole at Bristol and two top ten finishes. K&N Pro Series East champion Max Gresham was hired to drive the truck for 2012, but left due to sponsorship issues after eight races and no top-15 finishes. The truck did not run for the rest of the year

Kevin Harvick was signed for two races in 2013 in a third NTS truck. He ran the 24 truck in second race of the season at Martinsville, finishing 25th after a tire issue. Harvick and Tide were entered the next week at Rockingham but withdrew. After 4 races, Brennan Newberry and the No. 14 crew switched to number No. 24. Newberry scored a single top ten finish (at Pocono) and had four DNFs, finishing 19th in points.

In 2014, the truck ran a single race at the Daytona season opener with Newberry and GunBroker.com, finishing 25th. The No. 24 truck was replaced by the No. 9 entry for the remainder of the season.

==== Truck No. 24 results ====
Year	Driver	No.	Make	1	2	3	4	5	6	7	8	9	10	11	12	13	14	15	16	17	18	19	20	21	22	23	24	25	Owners	Pts
2011	Elliott Sadler	24	Chevy	DAY	PHO	DAR	MAR	NSH	DOV	CLT	KAN	TEX	KEN	IOW	NSH	IRP	POC	MCH	BRI; 9	ATL	CHI	NHA	KEN	LVS	TAL	MAR; 19	TEX	HOM; 7	42nd	100
2012	Max Gresham	24	Chevy	DAY; 26	MAR; 19	CAR; 18	KAN; 22	CLT; 24	DOV; 30	TEX; 21	KEN; 30	IOW	CHI	POC	MCH	BRI	ATL	IOW	KEN	LVS	TAL	MAR	TEX	PHO	HOM				36th	162
2013	Kevin Harvick	24	Chevy	DAY	MAR; 25	CAR; Wth	KAN																						21st	489
2013	Brennan Newberry	24	Chevy					CLT; 18	DOV; 24	TEX; 20	KEN; 32	IOW; 19	ELD; 27	POC; 10	MCH; 12	BRI; 25	MSP; 27	IOW; 22		LVS; 15	TAL; 32	MAR; 24	TEX; 13	PHO; 18	HOM; 29				21st	489
2013	Austin Dillon	24	Chevy																CHI; 7										21st	489
2014	Brennan Newberry	24	Chevy	DAY; 25	MAR	KAN	CLT	DOV	TEX	GTW	KEN	IOW	ELD	POC	MCH	BRI	MSP	CHI	NHA	LVS	TAL	MAR	TEX	PHO	HOM				N/A	

=== Truck No. 31 history ===
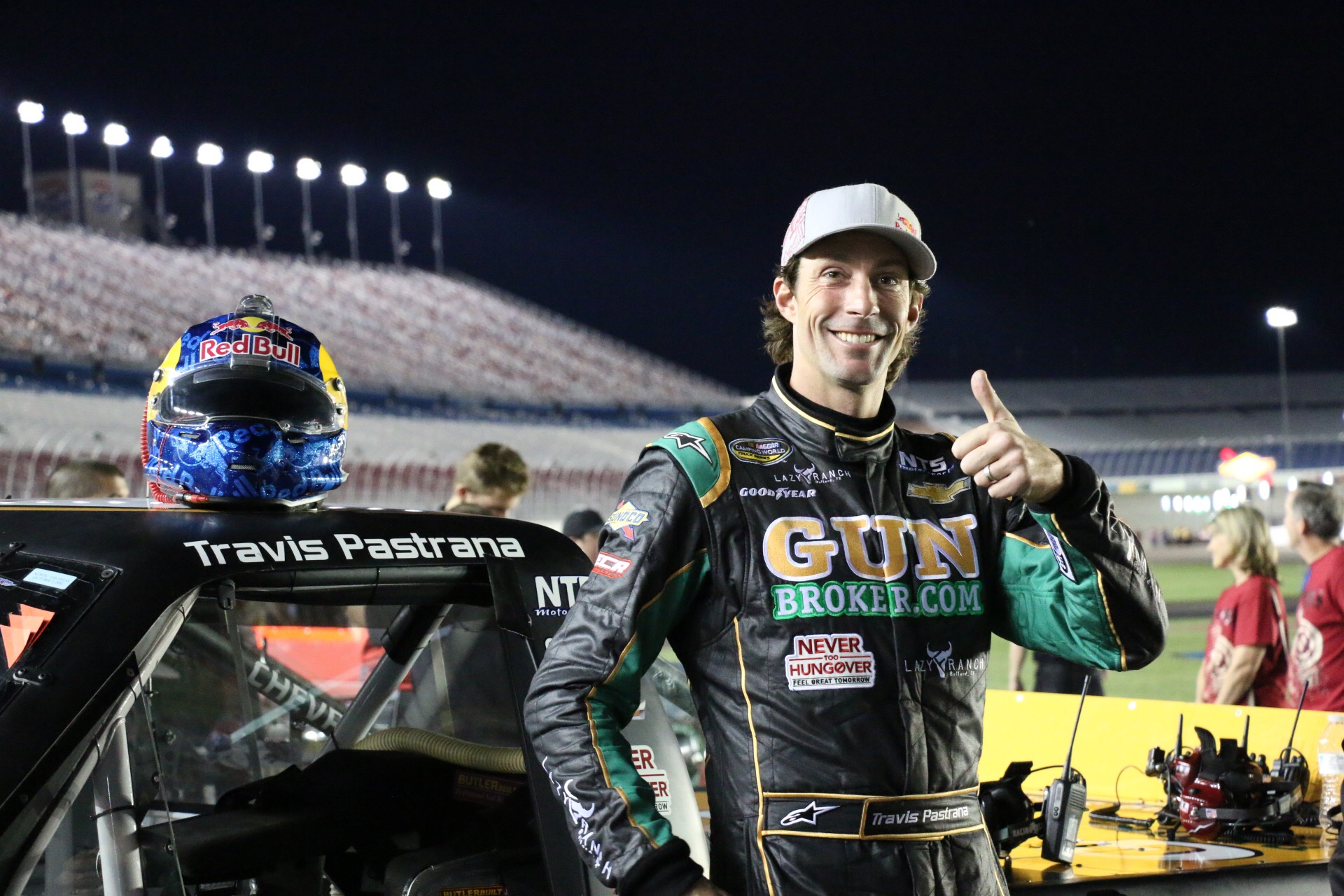
Travis Pastrana at Las Vegas in 2015

For 2015, NTS fielded a truck for 2012 series champion James Buescher for the first three races, using number 31. The truck was also run by Scott Lagasse Jr. in two races, Austin Dillon at Eldora, Ty Dillon at Bristol, Travis Pastrana at Las Vegas, and in the two final races of the season by Rico Abreu.

==== Truck No. 31 results ====
Year	Driver	No.	Make	1	2	3	4	5	6	7	8	9	10	11	12	13	14	15	16	17	18	19	20	21	22	23	Owners	Pts
2015	James Buescher	31	Chevy	DAY; 17	ATL; 8	MAR; 7			DOV; Wth	TEX	GTW	IOW	KEN														28th	303
2015	Scott Lagasse Jr.	31	Chevy				KAN; 8	CLT; 12																			28th	303
2015	Austin Dillon	31	Chevy											ELD; 6	POC	MCH											28th	303
2015	Ty Dillon	31	Chevy														BRI; 23	MSP	CHI	NHA							28th	303
2015	Travis Pastrana	31	Chevy																		LVS; 16	TAL	MAR	TEX			28th	303
2015	Rico Abreu	31	Chevy																						PHO; 28	HOM; 13	28th	303

== Xfinity Series ==
=== Car No. 55/77 history ===
In 2014, Brennan Newberry ran a part-time Nationwide Series schedule in the No. 55 usually run by Jamie Dick and Viva Motorsports. Bob Newberry was listed as the owner; the car was fielded by SS-Green Light Racing. Newberry finished 25th in his series debut at Loudon, then scored a solid 19th-place finish at Watkins Glen and a 23rd-place finish at Chicago. Newberry and NTS/SS-Green Light ran a fourth race at Newberry's favorite track Phoenix International Raceway in a No. 77 car, finishing 36th after an early crash. In 2015, NTS Motorsports and Rick Ware Racing teamed up to field Lagasse, Jr in the No. 15 Chevrolet Camaro to run at Daytona in July where he qualified well but finished 38th.

== K&N Pro Series East ==
=== Car No. 20 history ===
In 2014 Gray Gaulding, a member of NASCAR Next, moved over to NTS to run the full schedule in the K&N Pro Series East in the 20 Krispy Kreme Chevrolet Impala, in addition to a part-time Truck Series schedule. Gaulding would score a pole, four top fives, and nine top tens to finish third in points. Gaulding also ran both Phoenix races in the K&N Pro Series West, scoring a second-place finish in November.

Gaulding returned to the K&N East Series in 2015. After a single race, a third-place finish at New Smyrna Speedway, Gaulding parted ways with the team, joining Precision Performance Motorsports. Truck Series driver Daniel Hemric ran the car in the next two races, scoring a pole and two top ten finishes.

=== Car No. 24 history ===
In 2010, Brennan Newberry made his debut in the K&N Pro Series West for his father's team, running 3 races in the No. 39 Chevrolet with a best finish of 6th. Newberry ran a total of five K&N West races in 2011 between NTS's 29 and 39 cars, scoring two poles. He would make his K&N Pro Series East debut in the No. 29 car at Dover, finishing 25th. Jeff Oleen also ran two West Series races in the 39 car. Newberry would run two West Series races in 2012 and one in 2013 in the 29 car, while Dallas Montes ran three 2013 races for the team.

For 2014, Brennan Newberry ran the full 16-race K&N Pro Series East schedule in the No. 24 Qore-24 Impala, scoring one top 5 and four top ten finishes to finish 14th in points. Newberry also ran a single K&N West Series race, finishing second at Phoenix in February.

=== Car No. 33 history ===
After running the No. 33 in the K&N Pro Series East for Turner Scott Motorsports and Richard Childress Racing in 2014, Brandon Jones returned to the series for NTS in 2015, running select races in the No. 33 car beginning at Bristol.

== ARCA Racing Series ==
=== Car No. 92 history ===
NTS made its ARCA Racing Series debut in 2012 with Brennan Newberry, driving the No. 92 Chevrolet Impala at Michigan and Kansas where he finished both races in the top 5.

NTS returned to the ARCA Racing Series in 2013 with Newberry again driving the No. 92 Chevrolet Impala at Daytona, Talladega, and Pocono. He would finish 6th, 11th, and 4th respectively.

NTS fielded the No. 92 Chevrolet Impala for Daniel Hemric in the 2015 season opener at Daytona International Speedway, where he finished 13th.

== See also ==
- Kevin Harvick Incorporated
- Richard Childress Racing
