= 2012 NextEra Energy Resources 250 =

Race details
- Map of Speedway
- Date: February 24, 2012
- Official name: 2012 NextEra Energy Resources 250
- Location: Daytona International Speedway in Daytona Beach, Florida
- Course: Tri-oval
- Course length: 4.023 km (1.5 miles)
- Distance: 109 laps, 273 mi (439.351 km)
- Scheduled distance: 100 laps, 250 mi (402.336 km)
- Average speed: 119.169 mph (191.784 km/h)
- Attendance: 57,000

Pole position
Driver	Miguel Paludo	Turner Motorsports
- Time: 49.583

Most laps led
Driver	Miguel Paludo	Turner Motorsports
- Laps: 56

Winner
No. 7	John King	Red Horse Racing

Television in the United States
- Network: Speed
- Announcers: Rick Allen, Phil Parsons, Michael Waltrip

The 2012 NextEra Energy Resources 250 the 1st race of the 2012 NASCAR Camping World Truck Series and the 13th annual running of this event. The event was held on Saturday, February 24, 2012, at Daytona International Speedway in Daytona Beach, Florida. The event featured a surprise winner as John King won his first and only race in his NASCAR career as this race became known as a wreckfest.

== Entry list ==
- (R) denotes rookie driver
- (i) denotes driver who is ineligible for series driver points

#	Driver	Team	Make
0	Jake Crum	Jennifer Jo Cobb Racing	Ram
2	Brendan Gaughan (i)	Richard Childress Racing	Chevrolet
3	Ty Dillon (R)	Richard Childress Racing	Chevrolet
5	Paulie Harraka (R)	Wauters Motorsports	Ford
6	Justin Lofton	Eddie Sharp Racing	Chevrolet
07	T. J. Duke	SS-Green Light Racing	Chevrolet
7	John King	Red Horse Racing	Toyota
08	Ross Chastain (R)	SS-Green Light Racing	Toyota
8	Mike Skinner	Eddie Sharp Racing	Chevrolet
09	Travis Kvapil (i)	RAB Racing	Toyota
9	Ron Hornaday Jr.	Joe Denette Motorsports	Chevrolet
10	Jennifer Jo Cobb	Jennifer Jo Cobb Racing	Ford
11	Todd Bodine	Red Horse Racing	Toyota
13	Johnny Sauter	ThorSport Racing	Toyota
15	Dusty Davis	Arrington Racing	Ram
17	Timothy Peters	Red Horse Racing	Toyota
18	Jason Leffler	Kyle Busch Motorsports	Toyota
19	Brad Keselowski (i)	Brad Keselowski Racing	Ram
22	Joey Coulter	Richard Childress Racing	Chevrolet
23	Jason White	GB Racing	Ford
24	Max Gresham (R)	Joe Denette Motorsports	Chevrolet
27	Ward Burton	Hillman Racing	Chevrolet
28	Wes Burton	FDNY Racing	Chevrolet
29	Parker Kligerman	Brad Keselowski Racing	Ram
30	Nelson Piquet Jr.	Turner Motorsports	Chevrolet
31	James Buescher	Turner Motorsports	Chevrolet
32	Miguel Paludo	Turner Motorsports	Chevrolet
33	Cale Gale (R)	Eddie Sharp Racing	Chevrolet
39	Ryan Sieg	RSS Racing	Chevrolet
57	Norm Benning	Norm Benning Racing	Chevrolet
60	J. R. Fitzpatrick	Turn One Racing	Chevrolet
63	Caleb Roark	MB Motorsports	Ford
68	Clay Greenfield	Clay Greenfield Motorsports	Ram
73	Rick Crawford	Tagsby Racing	Chevrolet
74	Wheeler Boys	Mike Harmon Racing	Chevrolet
76	Derek White	Ray Hackett Racing	Ford
81	David Starr	Arrington Racing	Toyota
82	Grant Enfinger	BRG Motorsports	Ford
84	Chris Fontaine	Glenden Enterprises	Toyota
88	Matt Crafton	ThorSport Racing	Toyota
92	David Reutimann	RBR Enterprises	Chevrolet
93	Chris Cockrum	RSS Racing	Chevrolet
98	Dakoda Armstrong (R)	ThorSport Racing	Toyota
99	Bryan Silas (R)	T3R Motorsports	Ford
Official Entry List

== Qualifying ==
Miguel Paludo won the pole for the event with a time of 49.583 and a speed of 181.514 mph. Surprisingly, all 3 of the Turner Motorsports trucks qualified in the top 3 with Paludo winning the pole, Nelson Piquet Jr. in second, and James Buescher in third

Grid	No.	Driver	Team	Manufacturer	Time	Speed
1	32	Miguel Paludo	Turner Motorsports	Chevrolet	49.583	181.514
2	30	Nelson Piquet Jr.	Turner Motorsports	Chevrolet	49.606	181.430
3	31	James Buescher	Turner Motorsports	Chevrolet	49.736	180.955
4	3	Ty Dillon (R)	Richard Childress Racing	Chevrolet	50.032	179.885
5	19	Brad Keselowski (i)	Brad Keselowski Racing	Ram	50.043	179.845
6	18	Jason Leffler	Kyle Busch Motorsports	Toyota	50.188	179.326
7	33	Cale Gale (R)	Eddie Sharp Racing	Chevrolet	50.204	179.269
8	23	Jason White	GB Racing	Ford	50.209	179.251
9	22	Joey Coulter	Richard Childress Racing	Chevrolet	50.414	178.522
10	11	Todd Bodine	Red Horse Racing	Toyota	50.424	178.486
11	2	Brendan Gaughan (i)	Richard Childress Racing	Chevrolet	50.426	178.479
12	9	Ron Hornaday Jr.	Joe Dennete Motorsports	Chevrolet	50.427	178.476
13	8	Mike Skinner	Eddie Sharp Racing	Chevrolet	50.432	178.458
14	5	Paulie Harraka (R)	Wauters Motorsports	Ford	50.488	178.260
15	6	Justin Lofton	Eddie Sharp Racing	Chevrolet	50.547	178.052
16	15	Dusty Davis	Arrington Racing	Ram	50.565	177.989
17	81	David Starr*	Arrington Racing	Toyota	50.606	177.845
18	98	Dakoda Armstrong (R)	ThorSport Racing	Toyota	50.663	177.644
19	09	Travis Kvapil (i)	RAB Racing	Toyota	50.720	177.445
20	13	Johnny Sauter	ThorSport Racing	Toyota	50.732	177.403
21	82	Grant Enfinger	BRG Motorsports	Ford	50.746	177.354
22	84	Chris Fontaine	Glenden Enterprises	Toyota	50.750	177.340
23	7	John King	Red Horse Racing	Toyota	50.854	176.977
24	08	Ross Chastain (R)	SS-Green Light Racing	Toyota	50.858	176.963
25	27	Ward Burton	Hillman Racing	Chevrolet	50.869	176.925
26	68	Clay Greenfield	Clay Greenfield Motorsports	Ram	50.909	176.786
27	17	Timothy Peters	Red Horse Racing	Toyota	50.916	176.762
28	29	Parker Kligerman*	Brad Keselowski Racing	Ram	50.946	176.658
29	24	Max Gresham (R)	Joe Dennetee Motorsports	Chevrolet	50.955	176.626
30	88	Matt Crafton	ThorSport Racing	Toyota	51.074	176.215
31	60	J. R. Fitzpatrick	Turn One Racing	Chevrolet	51.212	175.740
32	99	Bryan Silas (R)	T3R Motorsports	Ford	51.416	175.043
33	39	Ryan Sieg**	RSS Racing	Chevrolet	51.777	173.822
34	07	T. J. Duke**	SS-Green Light Racing	Chevrolet	51.943	173.267
35	93	Chris Cockrum**	RSS Racing	Chevrolet	52.611	171.067
36	73	Rick Crawford	Tagsby Racing	Chevrolet	51.568	174.527
Failed to Qualify
37	0	Jake Crum	Jennifer Jo Cobb Racing	Ram	51.613	174.375
38	92	David Reutimann	RBR Enterprises	Chevrolet	51.721	174.011
39	76	Derek White	Ryan Hackett Racing	Ford	51.758	173.886
40	63	Caleb Roark	MB Motorsports	Ford	51.859	173.548
41	10	Jennifer Jo Cobb	Jennifer Jo Cobb Racing	Ford	51.968	173.183
42	28	Wes Burton	FDNY Racing	Chevrolet	52.281	172.147
43	57	Norm Benning	Norm Benning Racing	Chevrolet	52.315	172.035
44	74	Wheeler Boys	Mike Harmon Racing	Chevrolet	52.490	171.461
Official Qualifying results

* – David Starr and Parker Kligerman had to start at the rear of the field. Starr pitted before the green flag and Kligerman had adjustments outside impound

** – Ryan Sieg originally qualified 37th, T. J. Duke originally qualified 39th, and Chris Cockrum originally qualified in 44th. All 3 still made the field via Owners Points.

== Race ==
Pole sitter Miguel Paludo led the first lap and the first 20 laps of the race. The first caution flew on lap 18 for a 4 truck crash off of turn 4. The pack caught up to a slow truck in Chris Cockrum and Cockrum went to the bottom of the track so everyone else could pass him on the high side. Rookie Paulie Harraka got loose off of 4 and spun into Cockrum and went back up the race track into Jason Leffler pinning Leffler into the wall. Daokda Armstrong also spun trying the avoid the crash. Miguel Paludo won the race off of pit road to keep his race lead. After the longest green flag run of 19 laps, the second caution flew on lap 42 for debris on the race track. Paludo once again won the race off of pit road to keep his lead. On the restart, Paludo's teammate James Buescher passed him to take the lead. On lap 50, the third caution flew for a piece of debris that came off of rookie Dakoda Armstrong's truck. On the restart on lap 55, Paludo took the lead from Buescher with a push by Brad Keselowski. On lap 62, the fourth caution flew for a 5 truck accident in the tri-oval after John King made contact with Cale Gale turning Gale around and collecting T. J Duke, Mike Skinner, and Matt Crafton. James Buescher was the new race leader. On the restart with 32 to go, Nelson Piquet Jr. took the lead from Buescher.

=== Final laps ===
With 17 laps to go, Jason White attempted to pass Piquet Jr. for the lead. On the same lap out of turn 4, one of the hardest and scariest crashes in NASCAR history occurred bringing out the 5th caution. Out of turn 4, Miguel Paludo was running right behind Piquet when he lost control of his truck. His truck turned left and smashed into the inside wall head on at nearly full speed. The impact along with the SAFER barrier flexing in and shooting Paludo's truck back out made his truck fly through the air and spin it around like a top even catching fire. Paludo's crash was eerily similar to Danica Patrick's crash on the last lap of the Daytona 500 Duel race the previous day except Patrick hit the inside wall on the backstretch instead of the frontstretch. Fortunately, Paludo walked away from the crash uninjured as crews checked the SAFER barrier where Paludo hit. Jason White got out in front of Nelson Piquet Jr. when the caution flew which made him the leader of the race. On the restart with 10 to go, Jason White held onto his lead from Piquet. White was able to hold off a charge for the lead by James Buescher with 8 laps to go. But on the next lap with 7 to go, the 6th caution flew for a 5 truck crash in turn 4. Parker Kligerman and David Starr both had a run racing side by side with each other in a 3 wide pack. Dusty Davis, who was on the top lane, tried to come down in front of either Kligerman or Starr but turned down late and ended up squeezing Kligerman in between him and Starr. Both Kligerman and Starr both spun off of turn 4 collecting rookies Ross Chastain and Bryan Silas. As a result, the race would have three attempts of a green-white-checker finish. On the first attempt, Johnny Sauter took the lead from Jason White with a big push by Ron Hornaday. But in turn 4, the first big one would occur taking out 7 trucks and bringing out the 7th caution. Brad Keselowski got bumped from behind by Clay Greenfield and spun out collecting Ty Dillon, Dusty Davis, Max Gresham, Ryan Sieg, and Rick Crawford. On the second attempt, Sauter kept the lead with John King right behind him. It looked like Sauter was gonna be able to hold off everyone and take the win. But coming to the white flag, King turned Sauter before they reached the tri-oval triggering an 11 truck crash and bringing out the 8th caution just before the white flag flew. The trucks involved were Sauter, King, David Starr, Brendan Gaughan, Grant Enfinger, Matt Crafton, Nelson Piquet Jr., Parker Kligerman, Chris Fontaine, Ryan Sieg, and Ty Dillon. The race was red flagged for a short period to clean up the mess from the wreck in the tri-oval. As soon as the red flag was lifted, John King was the new race leader. King also looked like he was gonna have help to get the win since King's teammates at Red Horse Racing in Todd Bodine and Timothy Peters were gonna restart in 2nd and 3rd. On the restart, King got out in front with a push by Peters. Todd Bodine, meanwhile, fell back on the restart going back from 2nd to battling for the top 10 with Joey Coulter trying to push Bodine to get him up to speed. John King took the white flag as the leader. As soon as the trucks took the white flag, James Buescher got turned by Ron Hornaday in the tri-oval. Buescher turned left into Joey Coulter's right rear. Coulter hit the outside wall, caught air, got hit again by Buescher, and hit the catch fence with the rear of the truck spinning around and landing on his wheels. The wreck also collected Hornaday. This brought out the 9th and final caution of the race. John King was out in front when the caution flew and King scored his first and only NASCAR win of his entire career. Coutler walked away uninjured from the crash while 2 spectators were injured by debris that came out of Coulter's truck and went through the catchfence. Thankfully, there were no deaths and the catchfence got repaired in time for the Nationwide Series race the following day. Timothy Peters, Justin Lofton, Travis Kvapil, and Jason White rounded out the top 5 while Todd Bodine, Chris Fontaine, Ward Burton, Ty Dillon, and Clay Greenfield rounded out the top 10.

== Race results ==
Pos	Car	Driver	Team	Manufacturer	Laps Run	Laps Led	Status	Points
1	7	John King	Red Horse Racing	Toyota	109	6	running	47
2	17	Timothy Peters	Red Horse Racing	Toyota	109	0	running	42
3	6	Justin Lofton	Eddie Sharp Racing	Chevrolet	109	0	running	41
4	09	Travis Kvapil (i)	RAB Racing	Toyota	109	0	running	0
5	23	Jason White	GB Racing	Ford	109	16	running	40
6	11	Todd Bodine	Red Horse Racing	Toyota	109	0	running	38
7	84	Chris Fontaine	Glenden Enterprises	Toyota	109	0	running	37
8	27	Ward Burton	Hillman Racing	Chevrolet	109	0	running	36
9	3	Ty Dillon (R)	Richard Childress Racing	Chevrolet	109	0	running	35
10	68	Clay Greenfield	Clay Greenfield Motorsports	Ram	109	0	running	34
11	29	Parker Kligerman	Brad Keselowski Racing	Ram	109	0	running	33
12	82	Grant Enfinger	BRG Motorsports	Ford	109	0	running	32
13	15	Dusty David	Arrington Racing	Ram	109	0	running	31
14	9	Ron Hornaday Jr.	Joe Dennette Motorsports	Chevrolet	109	0	running	30
15	39	Ryan Sieg	RSS Racing	Chevrolet	109	0	running	29
16	93	Chris Cockrum	RSS Racing	Chevrolet	109	0	running	28
17	31	James Buescher	Turner Motorsports	Chevrolet	109	10	running	28
18	22	Joey Coulter	Richard Childress Racing	Chevrolet	108	0	crash	26
19	5	Paulie Harrakka (R)	Wauters Motorsports	Ford	105	0	running	25
20	2	Brendan Gaughan (i)	Richard Childress Racing	Chevrolet	104	0	crash	0
21	81	David Starr	Arrington Racing	Toyota	104	0	crash	23
22	30	Nelson Piquet Jr.	Turner Motorsports	Chevrolet	104	15	crash	23
23	88	Matt Crafton	ThorSport Racing	Toyota	104	0	crash	21
24	13	Johnny Sauter	ThorSport Racing	Toyota	104	4	crash	21
25	73	Rick Crawford	Tagsby Racing	Chevrolet	101	0	crash	19
26	24	Max Gresham (R)	Joe Denette Motorsports	Chevrolet	100	0	crash	18
27	19	Brad Keselowski (i)	Brad Keselowski Racing	Ram	99	0	crash	0
28	08	Ross Chastain (R)	SS-Green Light Racing	Toyota	94	1	crash	17
29	99	Bryan Silas (R)	T3R Motorsports	Ford	93	1	crash	16
30	32	Miguel Paludo	Turner Motorsports	Chevrolet	83	56	crash	16
31	07	T. J. Duke	SS-Green Light Racing	Chevrolet	62	0	crash	13
32	33	Cale Gale (R)	Eddie Sharp Racing	Chevrolet	61	0	crash	12
33	8	Mike Skinner	Eddie Sharp Racing	Chevrolet	61	0	crash	11
34	60	J. R. Fitzpatrick	Turn One Racing	Chevrolet	61	0	crash	10
35	98	Dakoda Armstrong (R)	ThorSport Racing	Toyota	33	0	crash	9
36	18	Jason Leffler	Kyle Busch Motorsports	Toyota	17	0	crash	8
Official Race results

Previous race: 2011 Ford 200	NASCAR Camping World Truck Series; 2012 season	Next race: 2012 Kroger 250
