= 2014 NextEra Energy Resources 250 =

Race details
- Map of Speedway
- Date: February 21, 2014
- Official name: 2014 NextEra Energy Resources 250
- Location: Daytona International Speedway in Daytona Beach, Florida
- Course: Tri-oval
- Course length: 2.5 miles (4.023 km)
- Distance: 100 laps, 250 mi (400 km)
- Weather: Clear
- Average speed: 142.631 mph (229.542 km/h)

Pole position
| Driver | Ben Kennedy | Turner Scott Motorsports |
- Time: no qualifying

Most laps led
| Driver | Ben Kennedy | Turner Scott Motorsports |
- Laps: 52

Winner
| No. 51 | Kyle Busch | Kyle Busch Motorsports |

Television in the United States
- Network: Fox Sports 1
- Announcers: Rick Allen, Phil Parsons, Michael Waltrip

The 2014 NextEra Energy Resources 250 was a NASCAR Camping World Truck Series race held at Daytona International Speedway in Daytona Beach, Florida on February 21, 2014. The race was the 15th iteration of the event and the first race of the 2014 NASCAR Camping World Truck Series. Rookie Ben Kennedy won the pole for the race and led the most laps. But it was Kyle Busch who would make a last lap pass on Timothy Peters and beat Peters by .016 seconds to win his first Truck Series race at Daytona.

== Background ==
Daytona International Speedway is a race track in Daytona Beach, Florida, United States. Since opening in 1959, it has been the home of the Daytona 500, the most prestigious race in NASCAR as well as its season opening event. In addition to NASCAR, the track also hosts races for ARCA, AMA Superbike, IMSA, SCCA, and Motocross. The track features multiple layouts including the primary 2.500 mi (4.023 km) high-speed tri-oval, a 3.560 mi (5.729 km) sports car course, a 2.950 mi (4.748 km) motorcycle course, and a 1,320 ft (402.3 m) karting and motorcycle flat-track. The track's 180-acre (72.8 ha) infield includes the 29-acre (11.7 ha) Lake Lloyd, which has hosted powerboat racing. The speedway is operated by NASCAR pursuant to a lease with the City of Daytona Beach on the property that runs until 2054. Dale Earnhardt is Daytona International Speedway's all-time winningest driver, with a total of 34 career victories (12- Daytona 500 Qualifying Races) (7- NASCAR Xfinity Series Races) (6- Busch Clash Races) (6- IROC Races) (2- Pepsi 400 July Races) (1- The 1998 Daytona 500).

=== Entry list ===
- (R) denotes rookie driver
- (i) denotes driver who is ineligible for series driver points

| # | Driver | Team | Make |
|---|---|---|---|
| 02 | Tyler Young (R) | Young's Motorsports | Chevrolet |
| 5 | John Wes Townley | Wauters Motorsports | Toyota |
| 07 | Michel Disdier | SS-Green Light Racing | Chevrolet |
| 7 | Brian Ickler | Red Horse Racing | Toyota |
| 08 | Jimmy Weller III (R) | SS-Green Light Racing | Chevrolet |
| 8 | Joe Nemechek | SWM-NEMCO Motorsports | Toyota |
| 10 | Jennifer Jo Cobb | Jennifer Jo Cobb Racing | Chevrolet |
| 13 | Jeb Burton | ThorSport Racing | Toyota |
| 17 | Timothy Peters | Red Horse Racing | Toyota |
| 19 | Tyler Reddick (R) | Brad Keselowski Racing | Ford |
| 20 | John King | NTS Motorsports | Chevrolet |
| 21 | Joey Coulter | GMS Racing | Chevrolet |
| 24 | Brennan Newberry | NTS Motorsports | Chevrolet |
| 28 | Ryan Ellis | FDNY Racing | Chevrolet |
| 29 | Ryan Blaney | Brad Keselowski Racing | Ford |
| 30 | Ron Hornaday Jr. | Turner Scott Motorsports | Chevrolet |
| 31 | Ben Kennedy (R) | Turner Scott Motorsports | Chevrolet |
| 32 | Ryan Truex (i) | Turner Scott Motorsports | Chevrolet |
| 35 | Mason Mingus (R) | Win-Tron Racing | Toyota |
| 39 | Ryan Sieg | RSS Racing | Chevrolet |
| 40 | Todd Peck | Peck Motorsports | Chevrolet |
| 50 | Travis Kvapil | MAKE Motorsports | Chevrolet |
| 51 | Kyle Busch (i) | Kyle Busch Motorsports | Toyota |
| 54 | Bubba Wallace | Kyle Busch Motorsports | Toyota |
| 57 | Norm Benning | Norm Benning Racing | Chevrolet |
| 58 | Parker Kligerman (i) | BRG Motorsports | Toyota |
| 60 | Charles Lewandoski | Young's Motorsports | Chevrolet |
| 63 | Justin Jennings | MB Motorsports | Chevrolet |
| 74 | Chris Cockrum | Rick Ware Racing | Chevrolet |
| 75 | Caleb Holman | Henderson Motorsports | Chevrolet |
| 77 | Germán Quiroga | Red Horse Racing | Toyota |
| 82 | Sean Corr | Empire Racing | Ford |
| 84 | Chris Fontaine | Glenden Enterprises | Toyota |
| 88 | Matt Crafton | ThorSport Racing | Toyota |
| 92 | Ross Chastain | RBR Enterprises | Ford |
| 93 | Jason White (i) | RSS Racing | Chevrolet |
| 98 | Johnny Sauter | ThorSport Racing | Toyota |
| 99 | Bryan Silas | T3R2 | Chevrolet |
Official Entry list

== Qualifying ==
Rookie Ben Kennedy won the pole for the race since he was the fastest in practice after qualifying was rained out.

| Grid | No. | Driver | Team | Manufacturer |
|---|---|---|---|---|
| 1 | 31 | Ben Kennedy (R) | Turner Scott Motorsports | Chevrolet |
| 2 | 30 | Ron Hornaday | Turner Scott Motorsports | Chevrolet |
| 3 | 29 | Ryan Blaney | Brad Keselowski Racing | Ford |
| 4 | 88 | Matt Crafton | ThorSport Racing | Toyota |
| 5 | 21 | Joey Coulter | GMS Racing | Chevrolet |
| 6 | 5 | John Wes Townley | Wauters Motorsports | Toyota |
| 7 | 51 | Kyle Busch (i) | Kyle Busch Motorsports | Toyota |
| 8 | 92 | Ross Chastain | RBR Enterprises | Ford |
| 9 | 98 | Johnny Sauter | ThorSport Racing | Toyota |
| 10 | 19 | Tyler Reddick (R) | Brad Keselowski Racing | Ford |
| 11 | 13 | Jeb Burton | ThorSport Racing | Toyota |
| 12 | 39 | Ryan Sieg | RSS Racing | Chevrolet |
| 13 | 8 | Joe Nemechek | SWM-NEMCO Motorsports | Toyota |
| 14 | 32 | Ryan Truex (i) | Turner Scott Motorsports | Chevrolet |
| 15 | 58 | Parker Kligerman (i) | BRG Motorsports | Toyota |
| 16 | 54 | Bubba Wallace | Kyle Busch Motorsports | Toyota |
| 17 | 02 | Tyler Young (R) | Young's Motorsports | Chevrolet |
| 18 | 17 | Timothy Peters | Red Horse Racing | Toyota |
| 19 | 20 | John King | NTS Motorsports | Chevrolet |
| 20 | 82 | Sean Corr | Empire Racing | Ford |
| 21 | 7 | Brian Ickler | Red Horse Racing | Toyota |
| 22 | 35 | Mason Mingus (R) | Win-Tron Racing | Toyota |
| 23 | 77 | Germán Quiroga | Red Horse Racing | Toyota |
| 24 | 74 | Chris Cockrum | Rick Ware Racing | Chevrolet |
| 25 | 99 | Bryan Silas | T3R2 | Chevrolet |
| 26 | 24 | Brennan Newberry | NTS Motorsports | Chevrolet |
| 27 | 84 | Chris Fontaine | Glenden Enterprises | Toyota |
| 28 | 50 | Travis Kvapil | MAKE Motorsports | Chevrolet |
| 29 | 75 | Caleb Holman | Henderson Motorsports | Chevrolet |
| 30 | 08 | Jimmy Weller III (R) | SS-Green Light Racing | Chevrolet |
| 31 | 93 | Jason White (i) | RSS Racing | Chevrolet |
| 32 | 63 | Justin Jennings | MB Motorsports | Chevrolet |
| 33 | 07 | Michel Disdier | SS-Green Light Racing | Chevrolet |
| 34 | 28 | Ryan Ellis | FDNY Racing | Chevrolet |
| 35 | 10 | Jennifer Jo Cobb | Jennifer Jo Cobb Racing | Chevrolet |
| 36 | 57 | Norm Benning | Norm Benning Racing | Chevrolet |
Failed to Qualify, withdrew, or driver changes
| 37 | 40 | Todd Peck | Peck Motorsports | Chevrolet |
| WD | 60 | Charles Lewandoski | Young's Motorsports | Chevrolet |
| WD | 83 | ?* | Glenden Enterprises | Toyota |
Official Starting grid

* – A second team from Glenden Enterprises was supposed to compete in the event along with the No 84 truck. However, no driver was announced and the team withdrew before the race with no announced driver.

== Race ==
Pole sitter Ben Kennedy took the lead and led the first lap of the race. The first caution of the race flew on lap 21 for it being the competition caution. Ben Kennedy won the race off of pit road and he led the field to the restart on lap 25. On lap 51, the second caution flew when Jennifer Jo Cobb's truck stalled down the backstretch. Kyle Busch won the race off of pit road after Ben Kennedy's truck struggled to fire and Busch led the field to the restart on lap 57. On lap 58, Timothy Peters took the lead and raced side by side with Busch for several laps as Busch took it back on lap 60 and Peters on lap 63 until lap 64 when Peters got in front of Busch.

=== Final laps ===
With 27 laps to go on lap 74, the big one struck in turn 1 bringing out the 3rd caution. It started when Ross Chastain bumped Parker Kligerman at the wrong angle and turned Kligerman down into Mason Mingus and Mingus spun and went head on into the outside wall at almost full speed triggering the crash. The wreck collected a total of 18 trucks. The trucks involved were Sean Corr, Bubba Wallace, John King, Ross Chastain, Brian Ickler, Parker Kligerman, John Wes Townley, Mason Mingus, Brennan Newberry, Ryan Sieg, Tyler Young, Chris Fontaine, Tyler Reddick, Ben Kennedy, Joey Coulter, Caleb Holman, Joe Nemechek, and Chris Cockrum. Kyle Busch won the race off of pit road and he led the field to the restart with 18 laps to go. With 15 laps to go, the 4th and final caution would fly when Travis Kvapil's engine blew. The race would restart with 11 laps to go. With 5 laps to go, Timothy Peters took the lead from Busch. Peters was looking for his second win at Daytona. With 4 to go, Ryan Truex attempted to take the lead but failed to get in front of Peters. He tried again with 3 to go but failed again. On the final lap, Peters held the lead until off of turn 4. Off of turn 4, Kyle Busch went to Peters' outside and was already there as Peters tried to block. Both Busch and Peters drag raced to the finish line and Busch beat Peters by .016 seconds in a very close finish and Busch would win the race, his first at Daytona in Trucks while Peters finished in second. Johnny Sauter, Ryan Truex, and Ron Hornaday rounded out the top 5 while Ryan Blaney, Jeb Burton, Joe Nemechek, Jimmy Weller III, and Germán Quiroga rounded out the top 10. This would be Jimmy Weller III's first and only top 10 of his entire NASCAR career.

== Race results ==
| Pos | Car | Driver | Team | Manufacturer | Laps Run | Laps Led | Status | Points |
|---|---|---|---|---|---|---|---|---|
| 1 | 51 | Kyle Busch (i) | Kyle Busch Motorsports | Toyota | 100 | 25 | running | 0 |
| 2 | 17 | Timothy Peters | Red Horse Racing | Toyota | 100 | 20 | running | 43 |
| 3 | 98 | Johnny Sauter | ThorSport Racing | Toyota | 100 | 0 | running | 41 |
| 4 | 32 | Ryan Truex (i) | Turner Scott Motorsports | Chevrolet | 100 | 0 | running | 0 |
| 5 | 30 | Ron Hornaday | Turner Scott Motorsports | Chevrolet | 100 | 0 | running | 39 |
| 6 | 29 | Ryan Blaney | Brad Keselowski Racing | Ford | 100 | 0 | running | 38 |
| 7 | 13 | Jeb Burton | ThorSport Racing | Toyota | 100 | 0 | running | 37 |
| 8 | 8 | Joe Nemechek | SWM-NEMCO Motorsports | Toyota | 100 | 0 | running | 36 |
| 9 | 08 | Jimmy Waller III (R) | SS-Green Light Racing | Chevrolet | 100 | 0 | running | 35 |
| 10 | 77 | Germán Quiroga | Red Horse Racing | Toyota | 100 | 0 | running | 34 |
| 11 | 39 | Ryan Sieg | RSS Racing | Chevrolet | 100 | 0 | running | 33 |
| 12 | 19 | Tyler Reddick (R) | Brad Keselowski Racing | Ford | 100 | 0 | running | 32 |
| 13 | 88 | Matt Crafton | ThorSport Racing | Toyota | 100 | 0 | running | 31 |
| 14 | 5 | John Wes Townley | Wauters Motorsports | Toyota | 100 | 0 | running | 30 |
| 15 | 31 | Ben Kennedy (R) | Turner Scott Motorsports | Chevrolet | 100 | 52 | running | 31 |
| 16 | 63 | Justin Jennings | MB Motorsports | Chevrolet | 100 | 0 | running | 28 |
| 17 | 99 | Bryan Silas | T3R2 | Chevrolet | 100 | 0 | running | 27 |
| 18 | 28 | Ryan Ellis | FDNY Racing | Chevrolet | 100 | 0 | running | 26 |
| 19 | 84 | Chris Fontaine | Glenden Enterprises | Toyota | 100 | 0 | running | 25 |
| 20 | 57 | Norm Benning | Norm Benning Racing | Chevrolet | 100 | 0 | running | 24 |
| 21 | 10 | Jennifer Jo Cobb | Jennifer Jo Cobb Racing | Chevrolet | 98 | 0 | running | 23 |
| 22 | 50 | Travis Kvapil | MAKE Motorsports | Chevrolet | 95 | 3 | running | 23 |
| 23 | 20 | John King | NTS Motorsports | Chevrolet | 87 | 0 | running | 21 |
| 24 | 07 | Michel Disdier | SS-Green Light Racing | Chevrolet | 83 | 0 | running | 20 |
| 25 | 24 | Brennan Newberry | NTS Motorsports | Chevrolet | 81 | 0 | running | 19 |
| 26 | 54 | Bubba Wallace | Kyle Busch Motorsports | Toyota | 76 | 0 | crash | 18 |
| 27 | 75 | Caleb Holman | Henderson Motorsports | Chevrolet | 74 | 0 | crash | 17 |
| 28 | 35 | Mason Mingus (R) | Win-Tron Racing | Toyota | 73 | 0 | crash | 16 |
| 29 | 58 | Parker Kligerman (i) | BRG Motorsports | Toyota | 73 | 0 | crash | 0 |
| 30 | 92 | Ross Chastain | RBR Enterprises | Ford | 73 | 0 | crash | 14 |
| 31 | 82 | Sean Corr | Empire Racing | Ford | 73 | 0 | crash | 13 |
| 32 | 21 | Joey Coulter | GMS Racing | Chevrolet | 73 | 0 | crash | 12 |
| 33 | 7 | Brian Ickler | Red Horse Racing | Toyota | 73 | 0 | crash | 11 |
| 34 | 02 | Tyler Young (R) | Young's Motorsports | Chevrolet | 73 | 0 | crash | 10 |
| 35 | 74 | Chris Cockrum | Rick Ware Racing | Chevrolet | 73 | 0 | crash | 9 |
| 36 | 93 | Jason White (i) | RSS Racing | Chevrolet | 45 | 0 | engine | 0 |
Official Race results

| Previous race: 2013 Ford EcoBoost 200 | NASCAR Camping World Truck Series; 2014 season | Next race: 2014 Kroger 250 |
