= Chase Pistone =

American racing driver (1983–2026)

- Born: August 20, 1983; Charlotte, North Carolina, U.S.
- Died: March 2, 2026 (aged 42); Mooresville, North Carolina, U.S.

NASCAR O'Reilly Auto Parts Series career
- 4 races run over 2 years
- 2014 position: 101st
- Best finish: 101st (2014)
- First race: 2006 Goody's 250 (Martinsville)
- Last race: 2014 VisitMyrtleBeach.com 300 (Kentucky)
| Wins | Top tens | Poles |
|---|---|---|
| 0 | 0 | 0 |

NASCAR FedEx Freight Truck Series career
- 6 races run over 2 years
- 2014 position: 30th
- Best finish: 30th (2014)
- First race: 2005 Kroger 200 (Martinsville)
- Last race: 2014 Mudsummer Classic (Eldora)
| Wins | Top tens | Poles |
|---|---|---|
| 0 | 1 | 0 |
- Statistics up to date as of September 20, 2014.

Chase Pistone (August 20, 1983 – March 2, 2026) was an American professional stock car racing driver who competed in the NASCAR Xfinity, Truck, and ARCA Series. He was the grandson of two-time NASCAR Cup Series race winner "Tiger" Tom Pistone. Pistone was also a car builder of Legends Cars and Super Late Models.

== Racing career ==
=== Early career ===
Pistone began racing at age six. He won the Summer Shootout Championship Legends four times as a driver (two Semi-Pro, two Pro) between 1999 and 2005. He had over 80 feature event wins in Legends, Late Model, and USAR competition.

Prior to 2014, Pistone had only run two races in any of NASCAR's top three touring divisions. He made one Truck start in the No. 07 for Green Light Racing at Martinsville Speedway in 2005, finishing 35th. In 2006, Pistone returned to Martinsville for the Goody's 250 Busch race in the No. 32 for Braun Racing, finishing 37th after mechanical failure. He also had a top-ten in his only ARCA start at Iowa Speedway in 2006 in the No. 50 Dodge for Bobby Jones Racing. He did try to make another ARCA start with the same team in 2007 ARCA Re/Max Series at the Daytona season-opener, but failed to qualify. This was his last attempt in NASCAR or ARCA until 2014.

In March 2014, Pistone returned to racing after being without a ride for seven years. Now at age 30, Pistone signed to drive the No. 9 Chevrolet Silverado of NTS Motorsports for 14 races. He finished 13th in his debut in the second race of the season, also at Martinsville, where Pistone had tested earlier in the month. Pistone finished a strong ninth in his next start at Gateway after qualifying 5th. In his return to Iowa Speedway, he moved up from the 17th starting spot to finish 12th.

Pistone also drove the No. 31 Chevrolet Camaro for Turner Scott Motorsports (the successor to Braun Racing) in the Nationwide Series in standalone oval races, while regular driver Dylan Kwasniewski took over Kyle Larson's usual No. 42 Target car. Pistone's first two Nationwide starts in 2014 were both at Iowa Speedway, where he finished 14th and 18th. Pistone also drove the No. 31 at Kentucky Speedway in the fall.

Pistone did not return to either team in 2015 and was without a ride in any series. His return in 2014 ended up being for that one year only, and he did not race in NASCAR again.

== Team owner career ==
In addition to his driving career, Pistone also owned CP Inc, building Legends and Late Model stock cars, and offering leasing programs that include cars, crews, and transportation. The company also provides setup tuning, repair services, and camber cut tires. As an owner/builder, Pistone won several championships with various drivers, including former NTS Motorsports teammate Gray Gaulding.

== Death ==
Pistone died on March 2, 2026, at the age of 42.

== Motorsports career results ==
=== NASCAR ===
(key) (Bold – Pole position awarded by qualifying time. Italics – Pole position earned by points standings or practice time. * – Most laps led.)

==== Nationwide Series ====
NASCAR Nationwide Series results
| Year | Team | No. | Make | 1 | 2 | 3 | 4 | 5 | 6 | 7 | 8 | 9 | 10 | 11 | 12 | 13 | 14 | 15 | 16 | 17 | 18 | 19 | 20 | 21 | 22 | 23 | 24 | 25 | 26 | 27 | 28 | 29 | 30 | 31 | 32 | 33 | 34 | 35 | NNSC | Pts | Ref |
|---|---|---|---|---|---|---|---|---|---|---|---|---|---|---|---|---|---|---|---|---|---|---|---|---|---|---|---|---|---|---|---|---|---|---|---|---|---|---|---|---|---|
| 2006 | Braun Racing | 32 | Chevy | DAY | CAL | MXC | LVS | ATL | BRI | TEX | NSH | PHO | TAL | RCH | DAR | CLT | DOV | NSH | KEN | MLW | DAY | CHI | NHA | MAR; 37 | GTY | IRP | GLN | MCH | BRI | CAL | RCH | DOV | KAN | CLT | MEM | TEX | PHO | HOM | 135th | 52 | |
| 2014 | Turner Scott Motorsports | 31 | Chevy | DAY | PHO | LVS | BRI | CAL | TEX | DAR | RCH | TAL | IOW; 14 | CLT | DOV | MCH | ROA | KEN | DAY | NHA | CHI | IND | IOW; 18 | GLN | MOH | BRI | ATL | RCH | CHI | KEN; 20 | DOV | KAN | CLT | TEX | PHO | HOM | | | 101st | 0^{1} | |

^{*} Season still in progress
^{1} Ineligible for series points

==== Camping World Truck Series ====
NASCAR Camping World Truck Series results
| Year | Team | No. | Make | 1 | 2 | 3 | 4 | 5 | 6 | 7 | 8 | 9 | 10 | 11 | 12 | 13 | 14 | 15 | 16 | 17 | 18 | 19 | 20 | 21 | 22 | 23 | 24 | 25 | NCWTC | Pts | Ref |
|---|---|---|---|---|---|---|---|---|---|---|---|---|---|---|---|---|---|---|---|---|---|---|---|---|---|---|---|---|---|---|---|
| 2005 | Green Light Racing | 07 | Chevy | DAY | CAL | ATL | MAR | GTY | MFD | CLT | DOV | TEX | MCH | MLW | KAN | KEN | MEM | IRP | NSH | BRI | RCH | NHA | LVS | MAR; 35 | ATL | TEX | PHO | HOM | 90th | 58 | |
| 2014 | NTS Motorsports | 9 | Chevy | DAY | MAR; 13 | KAN | CLT | DOV | TEX | GTW; 9 | KEN; 28 | IOW; 12 | ELD; 17 | POC | MCH | BRI | MSP | CHI | NHA | LVS | TAL | MAR | TEX | PHO | HOM | | | | 30th | 141 | |

=== ARCA Re/Max Series ===
(key) (Bold – Pole position awarded by qualifying time. Italics – Pole position earned by points standings or practice time. * – Most laps led.)

ARCA Re/Max Series results
| Year | Team | No. | Make | 1 | 2 | 3 | 4 | 5 | 6 | 7 | 8 | 9 | 10 | 11 | 12 | 13 | 14 | 15 | 16 | 17 | 18 | 19 | 20 | 21 | 22 | 23 | ARMC | Pts | Ref |
|---|---|---|---|---|---|---|---|---|---|---|---|---|---|---|---|---|---|---|---|---|---|---|---|---|---|---|---|---|---|
| 2006 | Bobby Jones Racing | 50 | Dodge | DAY | NSH | SLM | WIN | KEN | TOL | POC | MCH | KAN | KEN | BLN | POC | GTW | NSH | MCH | ISF | MIL | TOL | DSF | CHI | SLM | TAL | IOW; 8 | 110th | 185 | |
| 2007 | Bobby Jones Racing | 50 | Dodge | DAY; DNQ | USA | NSH | SLM | KAN | WIN | KEN | TOL | IOW | POC | MCH | BLN | KEN | POC | NSH | ISF | MIL | GTW | DSF | CHI | SLM | TAL | TOL | N/A | 0 | |
