= Brennan Newberry =

American racing driver (born 1990)

- Born: February 9, 1990 (age 36); Bakersfield, California, U.S.

NASCAR O'Reilly Auto Parts Series career
- 4 races run over 1 year
- 2014 position: 107th
- Best finish: 107th (2014)
- First race: 2014 Sta-Green 200 (Loudon)
- Last race: 2014 DAV 200 (Phoenix)
Wins	Top tens	Poles
0	0	0

NASCAR FedEx Freight Truck Series career
- 43 races run over 3 years
- 2014 position: 24th
- Best finish: 19th (2013)
- First race: 2012 Kroger 250 (Martinsville)
- Last race: 2014 Lucas Oil 150 (Phoenix)
Wins	Top tens	Poles
0	2	1
- Statistics up to date as of November 8, 2014.

Brennan Newberry (born February 9, 1990) is an American former professional stock car racing driver.

== Racing career ==
Newberry began his racing career in go-karts in 2000; later moving to full-bodied stock cars, he competed in the SRL Southwest Tour in 2007, then moved to USAC competition in 2008, racing in the Ford Focus Midget Car Series; he scored one win during the 2008 season, ending the year fourth in series points. In 2009, he returned to the Southwest Tour before moving to NASCAR competition in 2010, racing in the Toyota All-Star Showdown before running a limited schedule over the following three years in the K&N Pro Series West, scoring two poles in five races run in 2011. He finished 23rd in points that season, his best in the series.

After failing to qualify for the season-ending race of 2011, Newberry made his debut in the Camping World Truck Series in 2012, driving for his family-owned NTS Motorsports team in ten races starting at Martinsville Speedway; he posted a best finish of 19th at Michigan International Speedway, ending the year 31st in series points.

For 2013, NTS Motorsports merged with Joe Dennette Motorsports, planning to run Newberry full-time in the Camping World Truck Series as a teammate to Ron Hornaday Jr., with veteran Eddie Pardue serving as crew chief. Competing for Rookie of the Year, he won the pole for the first race of the season at Daytona International Speedway. In July, Newberry won a last-chance qualifying race at Eldora Speedway for the Mudsummer Classic, before scoring his first career top-ten finish in the series at Pocono Raceway in August. At Chicagoland Speedway in September, Newberry was forced to sit out the race due to illness, with Austin Dillon substituting. Dillon was able to finish seventh in the race; Newberry had never scored that good of a finish in his career in any race, despite driving the same equipment.

In 2014, Newberry stepped back to run full-time in the K&N Pro Series East as a teammate to Gray Gaulding, in addition to running selected Truck Series races. On July 9, it was announced that Newberry made his Nationwide Series debut in the No. 55 Qore-24 Chevrolet Camaro for NTS Motorsports & SS-Green Light Racing in the Sta-Green 200 at New Hampshire Motor Speedway, finishing 25th. Newberry ran the No. 55 in two more races, finishing 19th at Watkins Glen and 23rd at Chicago. Newberry and NTS/SS-Green Light ran a fourth race at Newberry's favorite track Phoenix International Raceway in a No. 77 car, finishing 36th after an early crash.

== Personal life ==
The son of former Funny Car driver and current car owner Bob Newberry, Newberry is a graduate of Bakersfield College.

== Motorsports career results ==
=== NASCAR ===
(key) (Bold – Pole position awarded by qualifying time. Italics – Pole position earned by points standings or practice time. * – Most laps led.)

==== Nationwide Series ====
NASCAR Nationwide Series results
Year	Team	No.	Make	1	2	3	4	5	6	7	8	9	10	11	12	13	14	15	16	17	18	19	20	21	22	23	24	25	26	27	28	29	30	31	32	33	NNSC	Pts	Ref
2014	NTS Motorsports	55	Chevy	DAY	PHO	LVS	BRI	CAL	TEX	DAR	RCH	TAL	IOW	CLT	DOV	MCH	ROA	KEN	DAY	NHA; 24	CHI	IND	IOW	GLN; 19	MOH	BRI	ATL	RCH	CHI; 23	KEN	DOV	KAN	CLT	TEX			107th	0^{1}	
2014	NTS Motorsports	77	Chevy																																PHO; 36	HOM	107th	0^{1}	

==== Camping World Truck Series ====
NASCAR Camping World Truck Series results
Year	Team	No.	Make	1	2	3	4	5	6	7	8	9	10	11	12	13	14	15	16	17	18	19	20	21	22	23	24	25	NCWTC	Pts	Ref
2011	NTS Motorsports	14	Chevy	DAY	PHO	DAR	MAR	NSH	DOV	CLT	KAN	TEX	KEN	IOW	NSH	IRP	POC	MCH	BRI	ATL	CHI	NHA	KEN	LVS	TAL	MAR	TEX	HOM; DNQ	114th	-	
2012	NTS Motorsports	14	Chevy	DAY	MAR; 28	CAR; 23	KAN; 32	CLT; 27	DOV	TEX	KEN; 22	IOW; 36	CHI	POC	MCH; 19	BRI	ATL	IOW; 21	KEN; 27	LVS; 23	TAL	MAR; DNQ	TEX	PHO	HOM				31st	182	
2013	NTS Motorsports	14	Chevy	**DAY**; 33	MAR; 33	CAR; 21	KAN; 20																						19th	452	
2013	NTS Motorsports	24	Chevy					CLT; 18	DOV; 24	TEX; 20	KEN; 32	IOW; 19	ELD; 27	POC; 10	MCH; 12	BRI; 25	MSP; 27	IOW; 22	CHI	LVS; 15	TAL; 32	MAR; 24	TEX; 13	PHO; 18	HOM; 29				19th	452	
2014	NTS Motorsports	24	Chevy	DAY; 25	MAR																								24th	329	
2014	NTS Motorsports	9	Chevy			KAN; 24	CLT	DOV; 27	TEX; 16	GTW	KEN	IOW	ELD	POC	MCH	BRI; 17	MSP; 7	CHI; 13	NHA; 14	LVS		MAR; 18		PHO; 16	HOM				24th	329	
2014	NTS Motorsports	20	Chevy																		TAL; 11		TEX; 11						24th	329	

==== K&N Pro Series East ====
NASCAR K&N Pro Series East results
Year	Team	No.	Make	1	2	3	4	5	6	7	8	9	10	11	12	13	14	15	16	NKNPSEC	Pts	Ref
2011	NTS Motorsports	29	Chevy	GRE	SBO	RCH	IOW	BGS	JFC	LGY	NHA	COL	GRE	NHA	DOV; 25					61st	88	
2014	NTS Motorsports	24	Chevy	NSM; 13	DAY; 22	BRI; 4	GRE; 13	RCH; 26	IOW; 6	BGS; 15	FIF; 15	LGY; 11	NHA; 28	COL; 9	IOW; 26	GLN; 11	VIR; 13	GRE; 6	DOV; 25	14th	461	

==== K&N Pro Series West ====
NASCAR K&N Pro Series West results
Year	Team	No.	Make	1	2	3	4	5	6	7	8	9	10	11	12	13	14	15	NKNPSWC	Pts	Ref
2010	NTS Motorsports	39	Chevy	AAS	PHO	IOW; 8	DCS	SON	IRW; 16	PIR	MRP	CNS	MMP	AAS	PHO; 6				29th	412	
2011	NTS Motorsports	39	Chevy	**PHO**; 33	AAS	MMP	**IOW**; 11												23rd	569	
2011	NTS Motorsports	29	Chevy					LVS; 5	SON	IRW; 11	EVG	PIR	CNS	MRP	SPO	AAS	PHO; 26		23rd	569	
2012	NTS Motorsports	29	Chevy	PHO; 15	LHC	MMP	S99	IOW	BIR	LVS	SON	EVG	CNS	**IOW**; 35	PIR	SMP	AAS	PHO	41st	62	
2013	NTS Motorsports	29	Chevy	PHO	S99	BIR	IOW	L44	SON; 30	CNS	IOW	EVG	SPO	MMP	SMP	AAS	KCR	PHO	72nd	14	
2014	NTS Motorsports	24	Chevy	PHO; 2	IRW	S99	IOW	KCR	SON	SLS	CNS	IOW	EVG	KCR	MMP	AAS	PHO		51st	42	

^{*} Season still in progress
^{1} Ineligible for series points

=== ARCA Racing Series ===
(key) (Bold – Pole position awarded by qualifying time. Italics – Pole position earned by points standings or practice time. * – Most laps led.)

ARCA Racing Series results
Year	Team	No.	Make	1	2	3	4	5	6	7	8	9	10	11	12	13	14	15	16	17	18	19	20	21	ARSC	Pts	Ref
2012	NTS Motorsports	92	Chevy	DAY	MOB	SLM	TAL	TOL	ELK	POC	MCH; 4	WIN	NJE	IOW	CHI	IRP	POC	BLN	ISF	MAD	SLM	DSF	KAN; 5		52nd	415	
2013	NTS Motorsports	92	Chevy	DAY; 6	MOB	SLM	TAL; 11	TOL	ELK	POC	MCH	ROA	WIN	CHI	NJE	POC; 4	BLN	ISF	MAD	DSF	IOW	SLM	KEN	KAN	44th	585	
