= 2014 Kroger 250 =

2nd race of the 2014 NASCAR Camping World Truck Series

Race details
- Race 2 of 22 of the 2014 NASCAR Camping World Truck Series
- Date: March 30, 2014
- Official name: 16th Annual Kroger 250
- Location: Martinsville Speedway, Ridgeway, Virginia
- Course: Permanent racing facility
- Course length: 0.526 miles (0.847 km)
- Distance: 256 laps, 135 mi (216 km)
- Scheduled distance: 250 laps, 131 mi (211 km)
- Average speed: 68.741 mph (110.628 km/h)

Pole position
Driver	Bubba Wallace	ThorSport Racing
- Grid positions set by competition-based formula

Most laps led
Driver	Ron Hornaday	Turner Scott Motorsports
- Laps: 62

Winner
No. 88	Matt Crafton	ThorSport Racing

Television in the United States
- Network: FS1
- Announcers: Adam Alexander, Phil Parsons, and Michael Waltrip

Radio in the United States
- Radio: MRN

The 2014 Kroger 250 was the 2nd stock car race of the 2014 NASCAR Camping World Truck Series, and the 16th iteration of the event. The race was held on Saturday, March 30, 2014, in Ridgeway, Virginia at Martinsville Speedway, a 0.526 mile (0.847 km) permanent paper-clip shaped short track. The race was originally scheduled to be contested over 250 laps, but was increased to 256 laps, due to a NASCAR overtime finish. Matt Crafton, driving for ThorSport Racing, would hold on to his first win of the season. To fill out the podium, Bubba Wallace, driving for Kyle Busch Motorsports, and Ben Kennedy, driving for Turner Scott Motorsports, would finish 2nd and 3rd, respectively.

== Background ==
The layout of Martinsville Speedway, the circuit where the race was held.

Martinsville Speedway is a NASCAR-owned stock car racing short track in Ridgeway, Virginia, just south of Martinsville. At 0.526 miles (847 m) in length, it is the shortest track in the NASCAR Cup Series. The track was also one of the first paved oval tracks in stock car racing, being built in 1947 by partners H. Clay Earles, Henry Lawrence, and Sam Rice, nearly a year before NASCAR was officially formed. It is also the only race track that has been on the NASCAR circuit from its beginning in 1948. Along with this, Martinsville is the only oval track on the NASCAR circuit to have asphalt surfaces on the straightaways and concrete to cover the turns.

== Practice ==
Practice session was held on Friday, March 28, at 3:00 p.m. EST, and would last for 30 minutes. Ron Hornaday Jr., driving for Turner Scott Motorsports, would set the fastest time in the session, with a lap of 19.690, and an average speed of 96.171 mph (154.772 km/h).

Pos.	#	Driver	Team	Make	Time	Speed
1	30	Ron Hornaday Jr.	Turner Scott Motorsports	Chevrolet	19.690	96.171
2	00	Cole Custer	JR Motorsports	Chevrolet	19.817	95.554
3	32	Ben Rhodes	Turner Scott Motorsports	Chevrolet	19.859	95.352
Final practice results

== Qualifying ==
Qualifying was scheduled to be held on Saturday, March 29, but after rain came down, qualifying was canceled. Bubba Wallace, driving for Brad Keselowski Racing, would score the pole.

=== Qualifying results ===
Pos.	#	Driver	Team	Make
1	54	Bubba Wallace	Brad Keselowski Racing	Toyota
2	29	Ryan Blaney	Brad Keselowski Racing	Ford
3	13	Timothy Peters	Red Horse Racing	Toyota
Official qualifying results
Official starting lineup

== Race results ==
Fin	#	Driver	Team	Make	Laps	Led	Status	Pts
1	88	Matt Crafton	ThorSport Racing	Toyota	256	47	Running	43
2	54	Bubba Wallace (i)	Brad Keselowski Racing	Ford	256	34	Running	0
3	11	Ben Kennedy	Red Horse Racing	Toyota	256	0	Running	25
4	98	Johnny Sauter	ThorSport Racing	Toyota	256	61	Running	40
5	29	Ryan Blaney	Brad Keselowski Racing	Ford	256	3	Running	40
6	17	Timothy Peters	Red Horse Racing	Toyota	256	49	Running	26
7	77	German Quiroga	Red Horse Racing	Toyota	256	0	Running	37
8	32	Ben Rhodes	Turner Scott Racing	Chevrolet	256	0	Running	36
9	30	Ron Hornaday Jr.	Turner Scott Racing	Chevrolet	256	62	Running	37
10	7	Brian Ickler	Red Horse Racing	Toyota	256	0	Running	34
11	8	John Hunter Nemechek (R)	SWM-NEMCO Motorsports	Toyota	256	0	Running	33
12	00	Cole Custer	JR Motorsports	Chevrolet	256	2	Running	32
13	9	Chase Pistone	NTS Motorsports	Chevrolet	256	0	Running	31
14	92	Ross Chastain	RBR Enterprises	Ford	256	0	Running	30
15	33	Brandon Jones (R)	GMS Racing	Chevrolet	258	0	Running	29
16	19	Tyler Reddick	Brad Keselowski Racing	Ford	256	0	Running	28
17	21	Joey Coulter	GMS Racing	Chevrolet	256	0	Running	27
18	4	Erik Jones	Kyle Busch Motorsports	Toyota	256	0	Running	26
19	20	Gray Gaulding	Red Horse Racing	Toyota	256	0	Running	26
20	5	John Wes Townley	Athenian Motorsports	Chevrolet	255	0	Accident	25
21	13	Jeb Bruton	ThorSport Racing	Toyota	255	0	Running	24
22	75	Caleb Holman	Henderson Motorsports	Chevrolet	253	0	Running	23
23	1	Travis Kvapil (i)	MAKE Motorsports	Chevrolet	252	0	Running	0
24	07	Ray Black Jr.	SS-Green Light Racing	Chevrolet	250	0	Running	20
25	63	Justin Jennings	MB Motorsports	Chevrolet	249	0	Running	19
26	08	Korbin Forrister	BJMM with SS-Green Light Racing	Chevrolet	242	0	Running	18
27	10	Jennifer Jo Cobb	Jennifer Jo Cobb Racing	Chevrolet	241	0	Running	17
28	6	Norm Benning	Norm Benning Racing	Chevrolet	235	0	Running	16
29	15	Mason Mingus	Billy Boat Motorsports	Chevrolet	216	0	Running	15
30	68	Clay Greenfield	Clay Greenfield Motorsports	RAM	189	0	Drive Shaft	14
31	02	Tyler Young	Young's Motorsports	Chevrolet	157	0	Steering	13
32	23	Spencer Gallagher (R)	GMS Racing	Chevrolet	122	0	Accident	12
33	99	Bryan Silas	T3R2	Chevrolet	120	0	Accident	11
34	66	Josh Williams	Josh Williams Motorsports	Ford	82	0	Brakes	10
35	56	Raymond Terczak Jr.	RHT Racing	Chevrolet	52	0	Brakes	9
36	74	Alex Guenette	DGM Racing	Chevrolet	32	0	Fuel Pump	8
Official race results
