= Bryan Silas =

American stock car racing driver

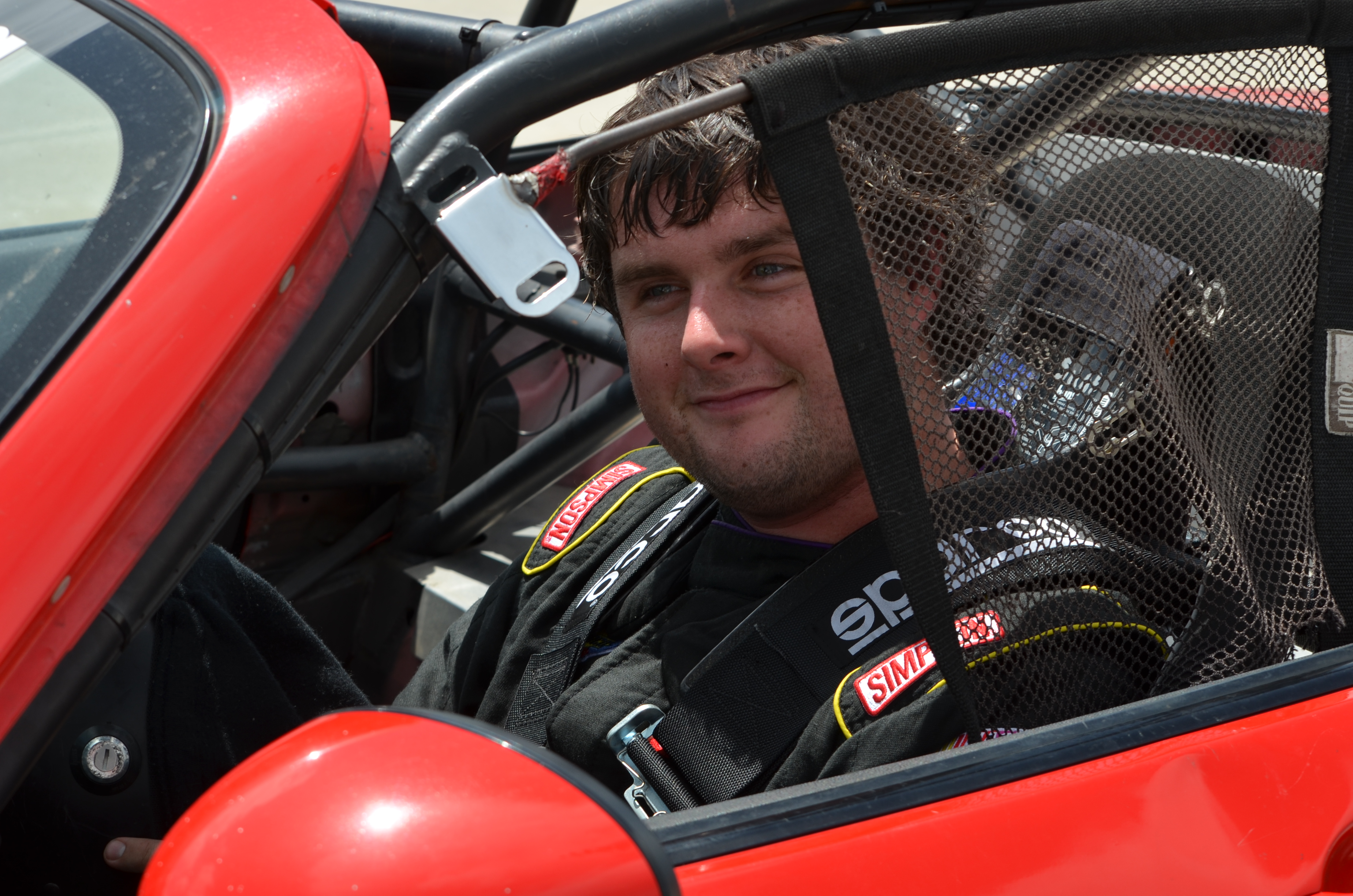
- Silas in 2013
- Born: June 13, 1987 (age 39); Stuart, Florida, U.S.

NASCAR O'Reilly Auto Parts Series career
- 7 races run over 2 years
- 2013 position: 121st
- Best finish: 121st (2013)
- First race: 2012 Subway Jalapeño 250 (Daytona)
- Last race: 2013 Ford EcoBoost 300 (Homestead)
Wins	Top tens	Poles
0	0	0

NASCAR FedEx Freight Truck Series career
- 85 races run over 9 years
- 2015 position: 45th
- Best finish: 10th (2014)
- First race: 2007 O'Reilly Auto Parts 250 (Kansas)
- Last race: 2015 Kroger 250 (Martinsville)
Wins	Top tens	Poles
0	3	0
- Statistics up to date as of March 28, 2015.

Bryan Silas (born June 13, 1987) is an American former professional stock car racing driver. He has competed in the Hooters Pro Cup Series and ARCA Racing Series in the past, and also recently competed in the NASCAR Camping World Truck Series, driving the No. 99 Chevrolet Silverado for T3R Motorsports.

== Personal life ==
Silas was born in West Palm Beach, Florida, and currently resides in Stuart. He married the former Misty Vance in 2010; they have two sons.

== Racing career ==
Silas began his professional racing career in 2006, making his debut in the ARCA Re/MAX Series at Berlin Raceway in Michigan, finishing 34th; he would run five additional ARCA races that year, with a best finish of 16th at Toledo Speedway. He also competed in a single Hooters Pro Cup Series event at USA International Speedway in Lakeland, Florida, finishing 32nd.

For the 2007 racing season, Silas fan the full ARCA Re/MAX Series schedule; he scored his first top-ten in the series at Lakeland, and posted a best finish of eightth at Salem Speedway and Kentucky Speedway en route to a ninth-place finish in the series standings. He also ran three Pro Cup Series events with a best finish of 21st, and made his debut in the Grand-Am KONI Challenge Series, driving for TRG Motorsports at New Jersey Motorsports Park and finishing 14th.

Silas spent the next three years competing in ARCA for car owner Andy Hillenburg and for various owners in Pro Cup; his best finish in ARCA competition being a fourth at Rockingham Speedway in 2009, and his best finish in points being sixth that same season. Silas ran a limited schedule in ARCA and Pro Cup in 2011 for a variety of owners; in his final ARCA race of the year, at Iowa Speedway in July, Silas drove the No. 11 Chevrolet that was being used for filming the movie Heartland, starring Zac Efron and Dennis Quaid; Efron had driven the same car early in the day for filming that Silas drove to 16th place in the event. Later that year he scored his first win in a major stock car event, winning the American 200 at Rockingham Speedway in the USA Racing Pro Cup Series, using pit strategy to secure the win.

=== NASCAR ===
Silas made his debut in NASCAR competition in the Craftsman Truck Series at Kansas Speedway in April 2007; he ran a limited schedule in the series that year, and again over the next four seasons, posting a career-best finish of 16th at Daytona International Speedway in the series' season-opening event in 2009.

For the 2012 season, Silas moved to the Camping World Truck Series full-time in the No. 99 Rockingham Speedway Ford for T3R Motorsports, competing for Rookie of the Year honors in the series.

Silas scored his first top-ten in the Camping World Truck Series at Texas in 2014, finishing on the lead lap in eighth. He finished his career best tenth points, collecting two top-tens.

== Motorsports career results ==
=== NASCAR ===
(key) (Bold - Pole position awarded by time. Italics - Pole position earned by points standings. * – Most laps led.)

==== Nationwide Series ====
NASCAR Nationwide Series results
Year	Team	No.	Make	1	2	3	4	5	6	7	8	9	10	11	12	13	14	15	16	17	18	19	20	21	22	23	24	25	26	27	28	29	30	31	32	33	NNSC	Pts	Ref
2012	Randy Hill Racing	08	Ford	DAY	PHO	LVS	BRI	CAL	TEX	RCH	TAL	DAR	IOW	CLT	DOV	MCH	ROA	KEN	DAY; 20	NHA	CHI	IND	IOW	GLN	CGV	BRI	ATL	RCH	CHI	KEN	DOV	CLT	KAN	TEX	PHO	HOM	129th	0^{1}	
2013	SR² Motorsports	24	Toyota	DAY	PHO	LVS	BRI	CAL	TEX	RCH	TAL	DAR; 36																									121st	0^{1}	
2013	SR² Motorsports	00	Toyota										CLT; DNQ	DOV	IOW	MCH	ROA																				121st	0^{1}	
2013	Go Green Racing	79	Ford															KEN; 26	DAY	NHA	CHI	IND	IOW	GLN; 23	MOH	BRI	ATL	RCH	CHI	KEN	DOV	KAN; 23	CLT	TEX; 29	PHO	HOM; 22	121st	0^{1}	

==== Camping World Truck Series ====
NASCAR Camping World Truck Series results
Year	Team	No.	Make	1	2	3	4	5	6	7	8	9	10	11	12	13	14	15	16	17	18	19	20	21	22	23	24	25	NCWTC	Pts	Ref
2007	Fast Track Racing Enterprises	71	Chevy	DAY	CAL	ATL	MAR	KAN; 29	CLT; 32	MFD	DOV	TEX	MCH; DNQ	MLW	MEM	KEN; 25	IRP	NSH	BRI; 30	GTW	NHA	LVS	TAL; 32	MAR	ATL	TEX	PHO	HOM; DNQ	54th	371	
2008	Fast Track Racing Enterprises	48	Chevy	DAY	CAL	ATL	MAR	KAN	CLT	MFD	DOV	TEX	MCH	MLW	MEM	KEN	IRP	NSH	BRI; 28	GTW	NHA	LVS	TAL; 25	MAR	ATL	TEX	PHO	HOM	67th	167	
2009	Fast Track Racing Enterprises	48	Chevy	DAY; 16	CAL	ATL; 25	MAR	KAN	CLT	DOV	TEX	MCH	MLW	MEM	KEN	IRP	NSH	BRI	CHI	IOW	GTW	NHA	LVS	MAR	TAL	TEX; 30	PHO	HOM; 23	43rd	375	
2010	Fast Track Racing Enterprises	48	Chevy	DAY; 32	ATL	MAR	NSH	KAN	DOV	CLT	TEX	MCH	IOW	GTY	IRP	POC	NSH	DAR	BRI	CHI	KEN	NHA	LVS	MAR	TAL; 25	TEX	PHO	HOM	81st	155	
2011	Chase Mattioli Racing	99	Ford	DAY	PHO	DAR	MAR	NSH	DOV	CLT; 19	KAN; 26	TEX	KEN	IOW	NSH	IRP	POC	MCH											93rd	0^{1}	
2011	T3R Motorsports	09	Ford																BRI; 22	ATL	CHI; 21	NHA	KEN	LVS	TAL	MAR; 26	TEX	HOM; 28	93rd	0^{1}	
2012	T3R Motorsports	99	Ford	DAY; 29	MAR; 26	CAR; 32	KAN; 21	CLT; 20	DOV; 22	TEX; 25	KEN; 26	IOW; 22	CHI; 24	POC; 17	MCH; 14	BRI; 22	ATL; 24	IOW; 18	KEN; 29	LVS; 16	TAL; 12	MAR; 29	TEX; 23	PHO; 16	HOM; 33				18th	471	
2013	T3R Motorsports	99	Ford	DAY; 32	MAR; 34	CAR; 23	KAN; 19	CLT; 34	DOV; 22	TEX	KEN; 22	IOW; 29	ELD; DNQ	POC; 24	MCH; 16	BRI; 29	MSP; 11	IOW; 33	CHI; 24	LVS; 22	TAL; 16	MAR; 33	TEX; 27	PHO; 33	HOM				21st	354	
2014	T3R Motorsports	99	Chevy	DAY; 17	MAR; 33	KAN; 19	CLT; 13	DOV; 25	TEX; 8	GTW; 16	KEN; 16	IOW; 29	ELD; 23	POC; 21	MCH; 15	BRI; 32	MSP; 19	CHI; 10	NHA; 20	LVS; 12	TAL; 12	MAR; 31	TEX; 19	PHO; 14	HOM; 18				10th	548	
2015	T3R Motorsports	99	Chevy	DAY; 7	ATL; 21	MAR; 31	KAN	CLT	DOV	TEX	GTW	IOW	KEN	ELD	POC	MCH	BRI	MSP	CHI	NHA	LVS	TAL	MAR	TEX	PHO	HOM			45th	75	

^{*} Season still in progress
^{1} Ineligible for series points

=== ARCA Racing Series ===
(key) (Bold – Pole position awarded by qualifying time. Italics – Pole position earned by points standings or practice time. * – Most laps led.)

ARCA Racing Series results
Year	Team	No.	Make	1	2	3	4	5	6	7	8	9	10	11	12	13	14	15	16	17	18	19	20	21	22	23	ARMC	Pts	Ref
2006	Bobby Jones Racing	50	Dodge	DAY	NSH	SLM	WIN	KEN	TOL	POC	MCH	KAN	KEN	BLN; 34	POC	GTW	NSH	MCH	ISF	MIL; 20	TOL; 16	DSF	CHI; 35	SLM			63rd	545	
2006	Fast Track Racing	11	Chevy																						TAL; 36	IOW; 26	63rd	545	
2007	Fast Track Racing	11	Chevy	DAY; 23	USA; 10		SLM; 8	KAN; 22	WIN; 21	KEN; 33	TOL; 15	IOW; 13		MCH; 32	BLN; 16			NSH; 16	ISF; 19	MIL; 13	GTW; 13	DSF; 37		SLM; 29	TAL; 22	TOL; 28	9th	4135	
2007	Fast Track Racing	11	Ford			NSH; 37							POC; 18			KEN; 8	POC; 27						CHI; 24				9th	4135	
2008	Fast Track Racing	11	Ford	DAY; 36		IOW; 8		CAR; 30	KEN; 8		POC; 15	MCH; 21		KEN; 21		POC; 17	NSH; 28			CHI; 6			TAL; 43				12th	4230	
2008	Fast Track Racing	11	Chevy		SLM; 8		KAN; 16			TOL; 27			CAY; 14		BLN; 13			ISF; 20	DSF; 10		SLM; 9	NJE; 17		TOL; 7			12th	4230	
2009	Fast Track Racing	11	Ford	DAY; 24		CAR; 4	TAL; 12	KEN; 9		POC; 15	MCH; 9			KEN; 22		POC; 13		CHI; 22				SLM; 9	KAN; 25	CAR; 14			6th	4625	
2009	Fast Track Racing	11	Chevy		SLM; 8				TOL; 8			MFD; 8	IOW; 17		BLN; 9		ISF; 20		TOL; 7	DSF; 10	NJE; 28						6th	4625	
2010	Fast Track Racing	11	Ford	DAY; 9	PBE; 16	SLM; 11	TEX; 8	TAL; 18	TOL; 27	POC; 28	MCH; 9	IOW; 13	MFD; 11	POC; 9	BLN; 22	NJE; 12	ISF; 14	CHI; 10	DSF; 10	TOL; 11	SLM; 7	KAN; 24	CAR; 23				10th	4140	
2011	Fast Track Racing	11	Ford	DAY; 29		SLM; 4	TOL																				26th	1050	
2011	Fast Track Racing	11	Chevy					NJE; 11	CHI					IOW; 16	IRP	POC	ISF	MAD	DSF	SLM	KAN	TOL					26th	1050	
2011	Eddie Sharp Racing	98	Toyota		TAL; 30																						26th	1050	
2011	Eddie Sharp Racing	6	Toyota							POC; 17	MCH; 6	WIN	BLN														26th	1050	
2014	Roulo Brothers Racing	17	Ford	DAY; 12	MOB	SLM	TAL	TOL	NJE	POC	MCH	ELK	WIN	CHI	IRP	POC	BLN	ISF	MAD	DSF	SLM	KEN	KAN				93rd	170	
