= 2017 NextEra Energy Resources 250 =

Race details
- Race 1 of 23 in the 2017 NASCAR Camping World Truck Series season
- Map of the speedway
- Date: February 24, 2017
- Location: Daytona International Speedway, Daytona Beach, Florida
- Course: Permanent racing facility
- Course length: 2.5 miles (4.023 km)
- Distance: 100 laps, 250 mi (402.336 km)
- Average speed: 129.720 miles per hour (208.764 km/h)

Pole position
Driver	Kaz Grala	GMS Racing
- Time: 49.813

Most laps led
Driver	Johnny Sauter	GMS Racing
- Laps: 52

Winner
No. 33	Kaz Grala	GMS Racing

Television in the United States
- Network: Fox Sports 1
- Announcers: Vince Welch, Phil Parsons, Michael Waltrip

The 2017 NextEra Energy Resources 250 was a NASCAR Camping World Truck Series race held at Daytona International Speedway in Daytona Beach, Florida on February 24, 2017. The race was the first of the 2017 NASCAR Camping World Truck Series, and was won by GMS Racing driver Kaz Grala from pole position; it was Grala's first NASCAR Truck Series victory, and he became the youngest driver to win at Daytona International Speedway in a NASCAR national series race.

== Entry list ==
No.	Driver	Team	Manufacturer
1	Tim Viens	TJL Motorsports	Chevrolet
02	Tyler Young	Young's Motorsports	Chevrolet
4	Christopher Bell	Kyle Busch Motorsports	Toyota
5	Korbin Forrister	Wauters Motorsports	Toyota
6	Norm Benning	Norm Benning Racing	Chevrolet
7	Brett Moffitt	Red Horse Racing	Toyota
8	John Hunter Nemechek	NEMCO Motorsports	Chevrolet
10	Jennifer Jo Cobb	JJC Racing	Chevrolet
12	Spencer Boyd (R)	Rick Ware Racing	Chevrolet
13	Cody Coughlin (R)	ThorSport Racing	Toyota
16	Ryan Truex	Hattori Racing Enterprises	Toyota
17	Timothy Peters	Red Horse Racing	Toyota
18	Noah Gragson (R)	Kyle Busch Motorsports	Toyota
19	Austin Cindric (R)	Brad Keselowski Racing	Ford
21	Johnny Sauter	GMS Racing	Chevrolet
22	J. J. Yeley (i)	AM Racing	Toyota
23	Spencer Gallagher (i)	GMS Racing	Chevrolet
24	Scott Lagasse Jr. (i)	GMS Racing	Chevrolet
27	Ben Rhodes	ThorSport Racing	Toyota
28	Bryan Dauzat	FDNY Racing	Chevrolet
29	Chase Briscoe (R)	Brad Keselowski Racing	Ford
30	Terry Jones	Rette Jones Racing	Ford
32	Austin Wayne Self	AM Racing	Toyota
33	Kaz Grala (R)	GMS Racing	Chevrolet
44	Brandon Brown (i)	Martins Motorsports	Chevrolet
45	T. J. Bell	Niece Motorsports	Chevrolet
47	Chris Fontaine	Glenden Enterprises	Toyota
49	Wendell Chavous (R)	Premium Motorsports	Chevrolet
50	Travis Kvapil	Beaver Motorsports	Chevrolet
51	Myatt Snider	Kyle Busch Motorsports	Toyota
52	Stewart Friesen (R)	Halmar Friesen Racing	Chevrolet
63	Bobby Gerhart	Bobby Gerhart Racing	Chevrolet
66	Ross Chastain (i)	Bolen Motorsports	Chevrolet
68	Clay Greenfield	Clay Greenfield Motorsports	Chevrolet
74	Jordan Anderson	Mike Harmon Racing	Chevrolet
75	Parker Kligerman	Henderson Motorsports	Toyota
83	Todd Peck	Copp Motorsports	Chevrolet
87	Joe Nemechek	NEMCO Motorsports	Chevrolet
88	Matt Crafton	ThorSport Racing	Toyota
92	Regan Smith	RBR Enterprises	Ford
98	Grant Enfinger (R)	ThorSport Racing	Toyota
99	Tommy Joe Martins (i)	MDM Motorsports	Chevrolet
Official entry list

=== Qualifying results ===
Pos	No.	Driver	Team	Manufacturer	R1	R2
1	33	Kaz Grala (R)	GMS Racing	Chevrolet	49.825	49.813
2	21	Johnny Sauter	GMS Racing	Chevrolet	50.043	49.937
3	23	Spencer Gallagher (i)	GMS Racing	Chevrolet	50.000	50.018
4	4	Christopher Bell	Kyle Busch Motorsports	Toyota	50.035	50.112
5	17	Timothy Peters	Red Horse Racing	Toyota	50.226	50.145
6	7	Brett Moffitt	Red Horse Racing	Toyota	50.311	50.293
7	88	Matt Crafton	ThorSport Racing	Toyota	50.241	50.359
8	27	Ben Rhodes	ThorSport Racing	Toyota	50.316	50.366
9	87	Joe Nemechek	NEMCO Motorsports	Chevrolet	50.370	50.441
10	5	Korbin Forrister	Wauters Motorsports	Toyota	50.301	50.442
11	98	Grant Enfinger (R)	ThorSport Racing	Toyota	50.409	50.518
12	18	Noah Gragson (R)	Kyle Busch Motorsports	Toyota	50.428	50.539
13	51	Myatt Snider	Kyle Busch Motorsports	Toyota	50.499	
14	24	Scott Lagasse Jr. (i)	GMS Racing	Chevrolet	50.521	
15	68	Clay Greenfield	Clay Greenfield Motorsports	Chevrolet	50.579	
16	29	Chase Briscoe (R)	Brad Keselowski Racing	Ford	50.618	
17	13	Cody Coughlin (R)	ThorSport Racing	Toyota	50.649	
18	19	Austin Cindric (R)	Brad Keselowski Racing	Ford	50.670	
19	8	John Hunter Nemechek	NEMCO Motorsports	Chevrolet	50.698	
20	16	Ryan Truex	Hattori Racing Enterprises	Toyota	50.759	
21	63	Bobby Gerhart	Bobby Gerhart Racing	Chevrolet	50.993	
22	32	Austin Wayne Self	AM Racing	Toyota	51.143	
23	02	Tyler Young	Young's Motorsports	Chevrolet	51.309	
24	30	Terry Jones	Rette Jones Racing	Ford	51.416	
25	92	Regan Smith	RBR Enterprises	Ford	51.423	
26	66	Ross Chastain (i)	Bolen Motorsports	Chevrolet	51.447	
27	22	J. J. Yeley (i)	AM Racing	Toyota	51.476	
28	49	Wendell Chavous (R)	Premium Motorsports	Chevrolet	51.679	
29	52	Stewart Friesen (R)	Halmar Friesen Racing	Chevrolet	51.703	
30	99	Tommy Joe Martins (i)	MDM Motorsports	Chevrolet	51.774	
31	83	Todd Peck	Copp Motorsports	Chevrolet	52.270	
32	50	Travis Kvapil	Beaver Motorsports	Chevrolet	53.124	
Did not qualify (DNQ)
	47	Chris Fontaine	Glenden Enterprises	Toyota	51.567	
	6	Norm Benning	Norm Benning Racing	Chevrolet	51.584	
	44	Brandon Brown (i)	Martins Motorsports	Chevrolet	51.649	
	45	T. J. Bell	Niece Motorsports	Chevrolet	52.403	
	28	Bryan Dauzat	FDNY Racing	Chevrolet	52.425	
	74	Jordan Anderson	Mike Harmon Racing	Chevrolet	52.654	
	1	Tim Viens	TJL Motorsports	Chevrolet	53.373	
	12	Spencer Boyd	Rick Ware Racing	Chevrolet	N/A	
	10	Jennifer Jo Cobb	JJC Racing	Chevrolet	N/A	
	75	Parker Kligerman	Henderson Motorsports	Toyota	N/A	
Official qualifying results

== Race summary ==
=== Race results ===
Pos	Grid	No.	Driver	Team	Manufacturer	Laps	Points
1	1	33	Kaz Grala (R)	GMS Racing	Chevrolet	100	56
2	22	32	Austin Wayne Self	AM Racing	Toyota	100	35
3	16	29	Chase Briscoe (R)	Brad Keselowski Racing	Ford	100	39
4	19	8	John Hunter Nemechek	NEMCO Motorsports	Chevrolet	100	34
5	9	87	Joe Nemechek	NEMCO Motorsports	Chevrolet	100	36
6	25	92	Regan Smith	RBR Enterprises	Ford	100	31
7	14	24	Scott Lagasse Jr. (i)	GMS Racing	Chevrolet	100	0
8	4	4	Christopher Bell	Kyle Busch Motorsports	Toyota	100	33
9	27	22	J. J. Yeley (i)	AM Racing	Toyota	100	0
10	13	51	Myatt Snider	Kyle Busch Motorsports	Toyota	100	30
11	17	13	Cody Coughlin (R)	ThorSport Racing	Toyota	100	26
12	8	27	Ben Rhodes	ThorSport Racing	Toyota	100	38
13	3	23	Spencer Gallagher (i)	GMS Racing	Chevrolet	100	0
14	7	88	Matt Crafton	ThorSport Racing	Toyota	99	23
15	2	21	Johnny Sauter	GMS Racing	Chevrolet	99	42
16	11	98	Grant Enfinger (R)	ThorSport Racing	Toyota	99	21
17	5	17	Timothy Peters	Red Horse Racing	Toyota	99	35
18	31	83	Todd Peck	Copp Motorsports	Chevrolet	99	19
19	28	49	Wendell Chavous (R)	Premium Motorsports	Chevrolet	98	18
20	10	5	Korbin Forrister	Wauters Motorsports	Toyota	71	21
21	21	63	Bobby Gerhart	Bobby Gerhart Racing	Chevrolet	41	16
22	6	7	Brett Moffitt	Red Horse Racing	Toyota	20	15
23	23	02	Tyler Young	Young's Motorsports	Chevrolet	12	14
24	32	50	Travis Kvapil	Beaver Motorsports	Chevrolet	11	13
25	24	30	Terry Jones	Rette Jones Racing	Ford	4	12
26	12	18	Noah Gragson (R)	Kyle Busch Motorsports	Toyota	1	11
27	18	19	Austin Cindric (R)	Brad Keselowski Racing	Ford	1	10
28	20	16	Ryan Truex	Hattori Racing Enterprises	Toyota	1	9
29	15	68	Clay Greenfield	Clay Greenfield Motorsports	Chevrolet	1	8
30	26	66	Ross Chastain (i)	Bolen Motorsports	Chevrolet	1	0
31	29	52	Stewart Friesen (R)	Halmar Friesen Racing	Chevrolet	1	6
32	30	99	Tommy Joe Martins (i)	MDM Motorsports	Chevrolet	1	0

== See also ==
- 2017 Daytona 500

Previous race: 2016 Ford EcoBoost 200	NASCAR Camping World Truck Series; 2017 season	Next race: 2017 Active Pest Control 200
