= 2012 NASCAR Camping World Truck Series =

American motorsport season

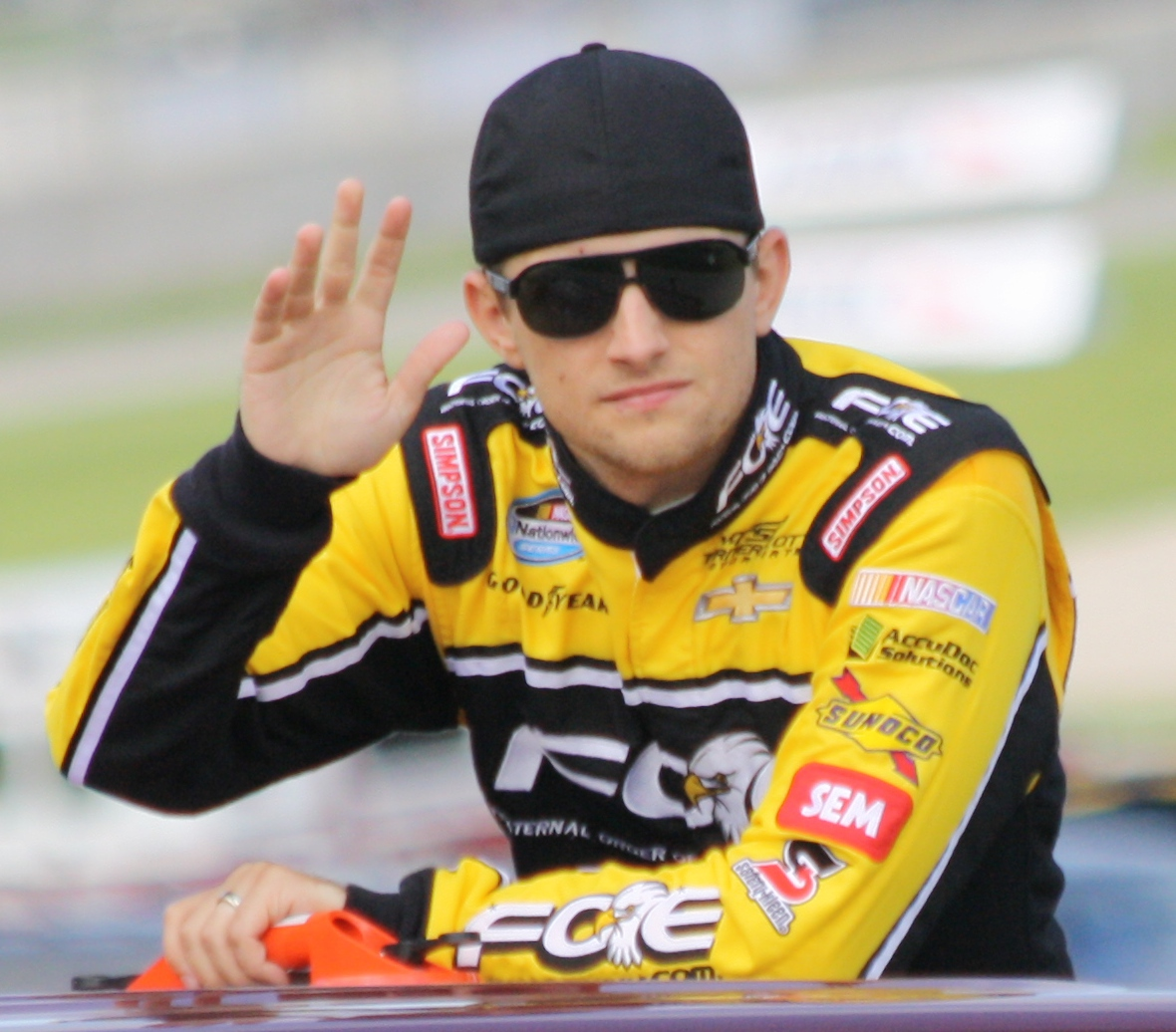
James Buescher, the 2012 Camping World Truck Series champion.

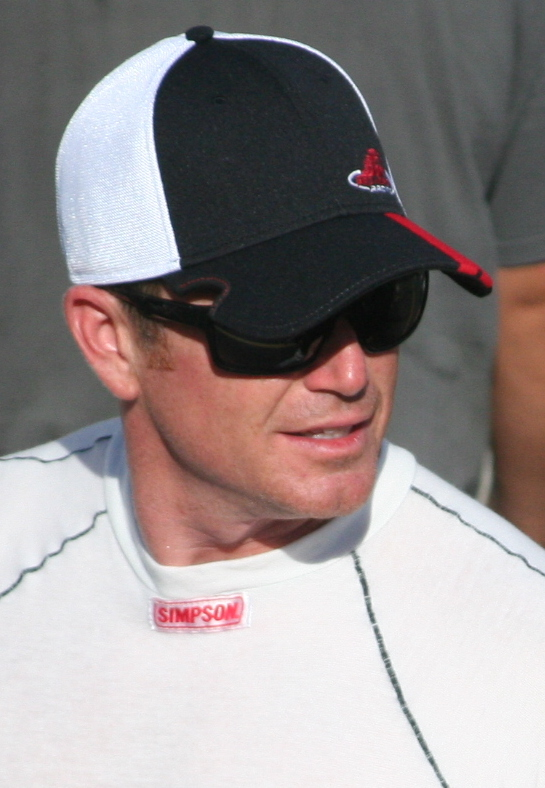
Timothy Peters finished second behind Buescher in the championship.

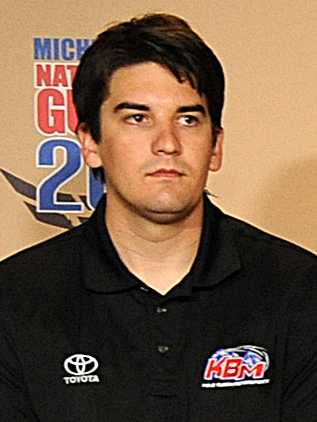
Joey Coulter finished third in the championship.

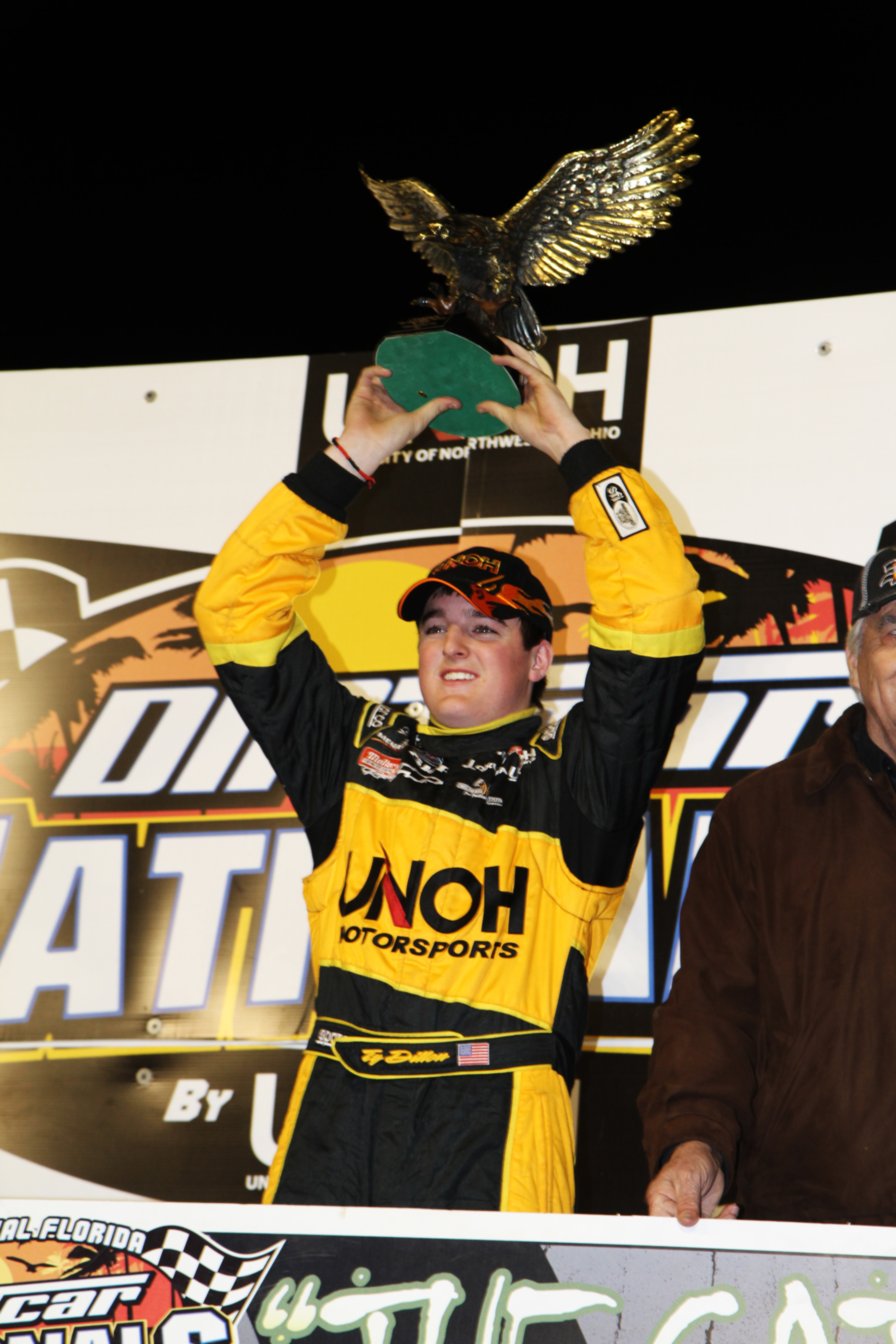
Ty Dillon, the 2012 NASCAR truck series Rookie of the Year.

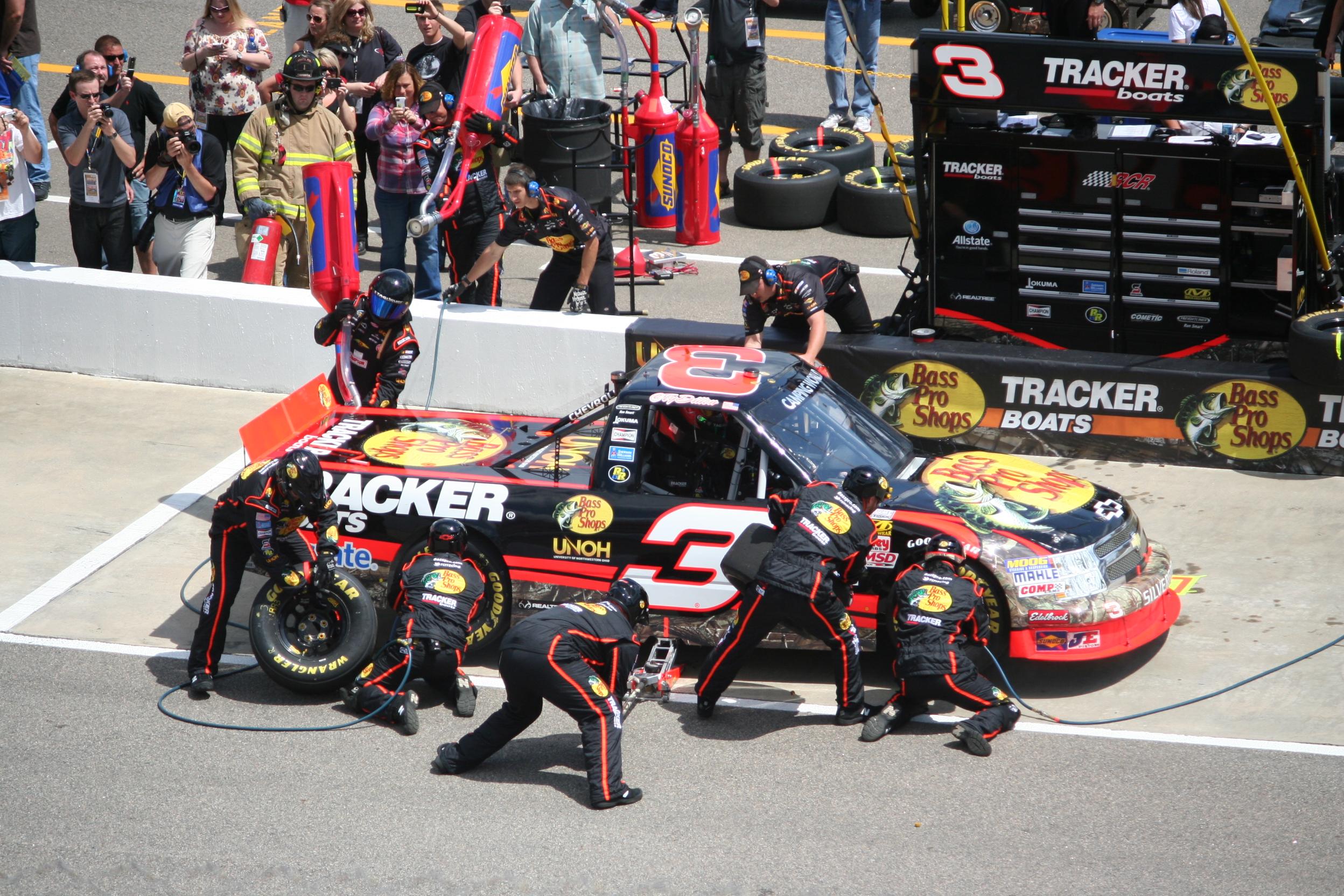
Chevrolet won the Truck series manufacturers' championship in 2012.

The 2012 NASCAR Camping World Truck Series was the eighteenth season of the third highest stock car racing in the United States. The season was contested over twenty-two races, beginning with the NextEra Energy Resources 250 at Daytona International Speedway and ending with the Ford EcoBoost 200 at Homestead-Miami Speedway. NASCAR announced some changes, including the removal of New Hampshire Motor Speedway, Nashville Superspeedway, and Lucas Oil Raceway from the schedule, and moving the Phoenix race back to its traditional fall date. In addition, Rockingham Speedway was added to the schedule, the first time NASCAR has raced at Rockingham since 2004. James Buescher of Turner Motorsports claimed his first championship with a 13th-place finish in the season finale. Chevrolet won the Manufacturer's Championship with 166 points and 12 wins.

== Teams and drivers ==
=== Complete schedule ===
Team	Manufacturer	No.	Race Driver	Crew Chief
SS-Green Light Racing	Toyota; Chevrolet	07	T. J. Duke1	Bobby Dotter
SS-Green Light Racing	Toyota; Chevrolet	07	Jake Crum1	Butch Miller; Bobby Dotter; Daniel Szymkowiak; Chris Jones; Richard Goad
SS-Green Light Racing	Toyota; Chevrolet	07	Johnny Chapman8	Butch Miller; Bobby Dotter; Daniel Szymkowiak; Chris Jones; Richard Goad
SS-Green Light Racing	Toyota; Chevrolet	07	Chris Jones2	Butch Miller; Bobby Dotter; Daniel Szymkowiak; Chris Jones; Richard Goad
SS-Green Light Racing	Toyota; Chevrolet	07	Caleb Roark1	Butch Miller; Bobby Dotter; Daniel Szymkowiak; Chris Jones; Richard Goad
SS-Green Light Racing	Toyota; Chevrolet	07	Jeff Agnew8	Doug Weddle
SS-Green Light Racing	Toyota; Chevrolet	07	Ross Chastain1 (R)	Bryan Berry
SS-Green Light Racing	Toyota	08	Ross Chastain21 (R)	Bryan Berry
SS-Green Light Racing	Toyota	08	Todd Peck1	Daniel Szymkowiak
RAB Racing	Toyota	09	Travis Kvapil1	Chris Rice
RAB Racing	Toyota	09	John Wes Townley (R)21	Chris Rice
Richard Childress Racing	Chevrolet	2	Brendan Gaughan8	Gil Martin; Marcus Richmond; Gere Kennon Jr.
Richard Childress Racing	Chevrolet	2	Kevin Harvick3	Gil Martin; Marcus Richmond; Gere Kennon Jr.
Richard Childress Racing	Chevrolet	2	Tim George Jr.11	Gil Martin; Marcus Richmond; Gere Kennon Jr.
Richard Childress Racing	Chevrolet	3	Ty Dillon (R)	Scott Naset; Marcus Richmond
Richard Childress Racing	Chevrolet	22	Joey Coulter	Harold Holly
Eddie Sharp Racing	Chevrolet	6	Justin Lofton	Daniel Bormann
Eddie Sharp Racing	Chevrolet	33	Cale Gale (R)	Jerry Baxter
Joe Denette Motorsports	Chevrolet	9	Ron Hornaday Jr.	Jeff Hensley; Terry Snyder
Jennifer Jo Cobb Racing	Ford; Ram	10	Jennifer Jo Cobb20	Steve Kuykendall
Jennifer Jo Cobb Racing	Ford; Ram	10	Jake Crum1	Steve Kuykendall
Jennifer Jo Cobb Racing	Chevrolet	10	Chris Lafferty1	Steve Kuykendall
Red Horse Racing	Toyota	11	Todd Bodine	Rick Gay
Red Horse Racing	Toyota	17	Timothy Peters	Butch Hylton
ThorSport Racing	Toyota	13	Johnny Sauter	Joe Shear Jr.
ThorSport Racing	Toyota	88	Matt Crafton	Carl Joiner
Kyle Busch Motorsports	Toyota	18	Jason Leffler9	Eric Phillips
Kyle Busch Motorsports	Toyota	18	Brian Scott5	Eric Phillips
Kyle Busch Motorsports	Toyota	18	Kurt Busch2	Eric Phillips
Kyle Busch Motorsports	Toyota	18	Kyle Busch3	Eric Phillips
Kyle Busch Motorsports	Toyota	18	Drew Herring1	Eric Phillips
Kyle Busch Motorsports	Toyota	18	David Mayhew1	Eric Phillips
Kyle Busch Motorsports	Toyota	18	Denny Hamlin1	Eric Phillips
GB Racing	Ford	23	Jason White	Doug George
Hillman Racing	Chevrolet	27	Ward Burton1	Trip Bruce
Hillman Racing	Chevrolet	27	Jeb Burton (R)5	Trip Bruce
Hillman Racing	Chevrolet	27	Brandon Knupp2	Chris Showalter; Mark Hillman; Brian MacDonald; Michael Leitner; Jason Overstreet
Hillman Racing	Chevrolet	27	C. E. Falk3	Chris Showalter; Mark Hillman; Brian MacDonald; Michael Leitner; Jason Overstreet
Hillman Racing	Chevrolet	27	Travis Miller3	Chris Showalter; Mark Hillman; Brian MacDonald; Michael Leitner; Jason Overstreet
Hillman Racing	Chevrolet	27	B. J. McLeod1	Chris Showalter; Mark Hillman; Brian MacDonald; Michael Leitner; Jason Overstreet
Hillman Racing	Chevrolet	27	Stephen Leicht2	Chris Showalter; Mark Hillman; Brian MacDonald; Michael Leitner; Jason Overstreet
Hillman Racing	Chevrolet	27	Ryan Lynch1	Chris Showalter; Mark Hillman; Brian MacDonald; Michael Leitner; Jason Overstreet
Hillman Racing	Chevrolet	27	Cole Whitt1	Chris Showalter; Mark Hillman; Brian MacDonald; Michael Leitner; Jason Overstreet
Hillman Racing	Chevrolet	27	Ryan Truex1	Chris Showalter; Mark Hillman; Brian MacDonald; Michael Leitner; Jason Overstreet
Hillman Racing	Chevrolet	27	Jason Leffler1	Chris Showalter; Mark Hillman; Brian MacDonald; Michael Leitner; Jason Overstreet
Brad Keselowski Racing	Ram	29	Parker Kligerman11	Doug Randolph
Brad Keselowski Racing	Ram	29	Ryan Blaney8	Doug Randolph
Brad Keselowski Racing	Ram	29	Grant Enfinger1	Doug Randolph
Brad Keselowski Racing	Ram	29	Brad Keselowski2	Jeff Stankiewicz
Turner Motorsports	Chevrolet	30	Nelson Piquet Jr.	Chris Carrier
Turner Motorsports	Chevrolet	31	James Buescher	Michael Shelton
Turner Motorsports	Chevrolet	32	Miguel Paludo	Mike Hillman Jr. Jeff Hensley
RSS Racing	Chevrolet	39	Ryan Sieg21	Rod Sieg; Tony Wilson
RSS Racing	Chevrolet	39	Chris Jones1	Rod Sieg; Tony Wilson
RSS Racing	Chevrolet	93	Chris Cockrum4	Rod Sieg; Timothy Brown; Mike Garvey; Tony Wilson
RSS Racing	Chevrolet	93	B. J. McLeod1	Rod Sieg; Timothy Brown; Mike Garvey; Tony Wilson
RSS Racing	Chevrolet	93	Johnny Chapman2	Rod Sieg; Timothy Brown; Mike Garvey; Tony Wilson
RSS Racing	Chevrolet	93	Brent Raymer1	Rod Sieg; Timothy Brown; Mike Garvey; Tony Wilson
RSS Racing	Chevrolet	93	Dennis Setzer7	Rod Sieg; Timothy Brown; Mike Garvey; Tony Wilson
RSS Racing	Chevrolet	93	Ryan Sieg1	Rod Sieg; Timothy Brown; Mike Garvey; Tony Wilson
RSS Racing	Chevrolet	93	Chris Jones4	Rod Sieg; Timothy Brown; Mike Garvey; Tony Wilson
RSS Racing	Chevrolet	93	Tim George Jr.1	Rod Sieg; Timothy Brown; Mike Garvey; Tony Wilson
RSS Racing	Chevrolet	93	Ryan Lynch1	Rod Sieg; Timothy Brown; Mike Garvey; Tony Wilson
Norm Benning Racing	Chevrolet	57	Norm Benning	James Dugger; Ted Walters
Glenden Enterprises	Toyota; Chevrolet	84	Chris Fontaine17	Kevin Ingram
Glenden Enterprises	Toyota; Chevrolet	84	B. J. McLeod1	Kevin Ingram
Glenden Enterprises	Toyota; Chevrolet	84	Russ Dugger2	Kevin Ingram
Glenden Enterprises	Toyota; Chevrolet	84	Mario Gosselin1	Kevin Ingram
Glenden Enterprises	Toyota; Chevrolet	84	Wayne Edwards1	Aaron Brown
T3R Motorsports	Ford	99	Bryan Silas (R)	Cal Boprey

=== Limited schedule ===
Team	Manufacturer	No.	Race Driver	Crew Chief	Rounds
Obregon Racing	Ford	00	Clay Greenfield	Scott Kazura	1
Rick Ware Racing	Chevrolet	1	Donnie Neuenberger	Carl Long	1
Young's Motorsports	Chevrolet	02	Tyler Young	Cody Sauls	4
Turner Motorsports	Chevrolet	4	Kasey Kahne	Mike Shiplett	1
Turner Motorsports	Chevrolet	4	Kyle Larson	Trent Owens; Mike Hillman Jr.	4
Turner Motorsports	Chevrolet	4	Augie Grill	Trent Owens; Mike Hillman Jr.	1
Turner Motorsports	Chevrolet	4	Dakoda Armstrong	Trent Owens; Mike Hillman Jr.	1
Turner Motorsports	Chevrolet	4	Brandon McReynolds	Trent Owens; Mike Hillman Jr.	1
Wauters Motorsports	Ford	5	Paulie Harraka (R)	Richie Wauters	11
Wauters Motorsports	Ford	5	John King	Richie Wauters	2
Wauters Motorsports	Ford	5	Aric Almirola	Richie Wauters	3
Wauters Motorsports	Ford	5	Ryan Reed	Richie Wauters	1
Wauters Motorsports	Ford	5	Josh Richards	Richie Wauters	1
RSS Racing	Chevrolet	5	Scott Riggs	Richie Wauters	1
RSS Racing	Chevrolet	5	Johnny Chapman	Richie Wauters	1
Red Horse Racing	Toyota	7	John King	Chad Kendrick	5
Red Horse Racing	Toyota	7	Parker Kligerman	Chad Kendrick	11
Eddie Sharp Racing	Chevrolet	8	Mike Skinner	Eddie Troconis	1
Eddie Sharp Racing	Chevrolet	8	Max Gresham (R)	Chris Showalter	5
Jennifer Jo Cobb Racing	Ram	8	Jennifer Jo Cobb	Steve Kuykendall	1
Jennifer Jo Cobb Racing	Ram	0	Jennifer Jo Cobb	Scott Kazura; Keith Wolfe	1
Jennifer Jo Cobb Racing	Ram	0	Jake Crum	Scott Kazura; Keith Wolfe	1
Jennifer Jo Cobb Racing	Ram	0	Chris Lafferty	Scott Kazura; Keith Wolfe	5
Jennifer Jo Cobb Racing	Ram	0	T. J. Bell	Scott Kazura; Keith Wolfe	2
Jennifer Jo Cobb Racing	Ram	0	Brandon Knupp	Scott Kazura; Keith Wolfe	1
Jennifer Jo Cobb Racing	Ram	0	Blake Koch	Scott Kazura; Keith Wolfe	6
Jake Crum Racing	Chevrolet	01	Jake Crum	Lee McCall; Keith Wolfe	5
DGM Racing	Chevrolet	12	Russ Dugger	Mario Gosselin	1
NTS Motorsports	Chevrolet	14	Brennan Newberry	Dan Deeringhoff	11
NTS Motorsports	Chevrolet	14	Brandon Miller	Dan Deeringhoff	1
Arrington Racing	Ram; Toyota	15	Dusty Davis	Mike Dayton	2
Arrington Racing	Ram; Toyota	15	Todd Shafer	Mike Dayton	1
Arrington Racing	Ram; Toyota	81	David Starr	Doug Howe	16
Brad Keselowski Racing	Ram	19	Brad Keselowski	Jeff Stankiewicz	4
Brad Keselowski Racing	Ram	19	David Mayhew	Jeff Stankiewicz	4
Brad Keselowski Racing	Ram	19	Ryan Blaney	Doug Randolph	1
BRG Motorsports	Toyota	20	Rick Crawford	Josh Bragg	1
BRG Motorsports	Toyota	20	Dusty Davis	Josh Bragg	1
BRG Motorsports	Ford	82	Grant Enfinger	Josh Bragg	1
Empire Racing	Ford	82	Sean Corr	Ben Leslie	2
Joe Denette Motorsports	Chevrolet	24	Max Gresham	Terry Snyder	8
Hillman Racing	Chevrolet	25	Brandon Knupp	Michael Leitner; Brian MacDonald; Jason Overstreet	2
Hillman Racing	Chevrolet	25	Stephen Leicht	Michael Leitner; Brian MacDonald; Jason Overstreet	2
Hillman Racing	Chevrolet	25	B. J. McLeod	Michael Leitner; Brian MacDonald; Jason Overstreet	2
Hillman Racing	Chevrolet	25	Travis Miller	Michael Leitner; Brian MacDonald; Jason Overstreet	1
FDNY Racing	Chevrolet	28	Wes Burton	Dick Rahilly	5
Win-Tron Racing	Chevrolet	35	Matt Merrell	Mark Rette	2
Allgaier Motorsports	Ram	36	Grant Enfinger	Kelly Kovski	2
RSS Racing	Chevrolet	37	Jeff Green	Timothy Brown	2
RSS Racing	Chevrolet	37	Dennis Setzer	Jordan Sieg	1
RSS Racing	Chevrolet	38	Dennis Setzer	Rod Sieg; Jordan Sieg; Timothy Brown; Gilbert Garcia	8
RSS Racing	Chevrolet	38	Johnny Chapman	Rod Sieg; Jordan Sieg; Timothy Brown; Gilbert Garcia	1
RSS Racing	Chevrolet	38	Chris Jones	Rod Sieg; Jordan Sieg; Timothy Brown; Gilbert Garcia	8
RSS Racing	Chevrolet	38	B. J. McLeod	Robert Adamson	1
Reynolds Racing	Chevrolet	47	Benjamin Reynolds	Scott Coyle	3
MAKE Motorsports	Chevrolet	50	Natalie Sather	Bobby Burrell	2
Kyle Busch Motorsports	Toyota	51	Germán Quiroga	Rick Ren	4
Kyle Busch Motorsports	Toyota	51	Denny Hamlin	Rick Ren	1
Billy Ballew Motorsports	Chevrolet	51	Kurt Busch	Nick Harrison	1
Bill Martel Racing	Chevrolet	59	Kyle Martel	Gene Roberts	1
Turn One Racing	Chevrolet	60	J. R. Fitzpatrick	Kevin Starland	2
Turn One Racing	Chevrolet	60	Grant Enfinger	Kevin Starland	1
Turn One Racing	Chevrolet	60	Chad McCumbee	Kevin Starland	2
Turn One Racing	Chevrolet	60	Peyton Sellers	Kevin Starland	1
Pearce Racing	Ford	61	Wes Burton	Randy Dean	1
MB Motorsports	Ford; Chevrolet	63	Caleb Roark	Mike Mittler	1
MB Motorsports	Ford; Chevrolet	65	Tyler Tanner	Mike Mittler	1
MB Motorsports	Ford; Chevrolet	65	Scott Stenzel	Mike Mittler	2
MB Motorsports	Ford; Chevrolet	65	Justin Jennings	Mike Mittler	2
MB Motorsports	Ford; Chevrolet	65	Chris Lafferty	Mike Mittler	2
Clay Greenfield Motorsports	Dodge	68	Clay Greenfield	Gene Patient	9
Clay Greenfield Motorsports	Dodge	86	Scott Riggs	Gary Mann	1
Clay Greenfield Motorsports	Dodge	86	Blake Koch	Gary Mann	1
Clay Greenfield Motorsports	Dodge	86	Clay Greenfield	Gene Patient	1
Team 7 Motorsports	Chevrolet	70	Jeff Agnew	Doug Weddle	4
Tagsby Racing	Chevrolet	73	Rick Crawford	Jamie Jones; Jack Johnston	3
Mike Harmon Racing	Chevrolet	74	Wheeler Boys	Daniel Kolanda; David Walls	1
Mike Harmon Racing	Chevrolet	74	Rick Crawford	Daniel Kolanda; David Walls	1
Mike Harmon Racing	Chevrolet	74	Brian Weber	Daniel Kolanda; David Walls	2
Mike Harmon Racing	Chevrolet	74	Scott Riggs	Daniel Kolanda; David Walls	4
Mike Harmon Racing	Chevrolet	74	Mike Harmon	Daniel Kolanda; David Walls	6
Mike Harmon Racing	Chevrolet	74	Tim Andrews	Daniel Kolanda; David Walls	1
Henderson Motorsports	Chevrolet	75	Caleb Holman (R)	Kenny Hunley	9
Norm Benning Racing	Chevrolet	75	Adam Edwards	Gary Ritter	1
Norm Benning Racing	Chevrolet	75	Josh Wise	Gary Ritter	1
Ray Hackett Racing	Ford	76	Derek White	Bobby Burrell	1
Ray Hackett Racing	Ford	76	Ryan Hackett	Joe Shuryan	1
Glenden Enterprises	Chevrolet	83	Chris Fontaine	Kevin Boykin	1
RBR Enterprises	Chevrolet	92	David Reutimann	Jason Overstreet	4
RBR Enterprises	Chevrolet	92	Chad McCumbee	Kevin Starland	3
RBR Enterprises	Chevrolet	92	Scott Riggs	Dave Fuge	1
Peck Motorsports	Chevrolet	96	Todd Peck	Keith Wolfe	3
Adrian Carriers Racing	Chevrolet	97	Jeff Choquette	Nicholas Carlson	3
ThorSport Racing	Toyota	98	Dakoda Armstrong (R)	Dan Stillman	14
ThorSport Racing	Toyota	98	Travis Pastrana	Dan Stillman	1

Note: A driver designated with a (R) next to their name indicates that they are contenders for the 2012 Rookie of the Year award.

=== Team changes ===
The Kevin Harvick, Inc.-Richard Childress Racing Merger and Related Spinoff

- Richard Childress Racing, per agreement in the Kevin Harvick, Inc. merger agreement, acquired the 2011 Owners Champion No. 2 truck as part of the Harvick-Childress merger that also included the No. 2 and No. 33 Nationwide teams. The No. 8 and No. 33 trucks were spun off in a separate deal.
- Harvick spun off the No. 8 and No. 33 Truck teams, which Eddie Sharp Racing, acquired. The teams in the spinoff join the present No. 6 truck driven by Justin Lofton to form a three-truck team, which resulted in a September 2011 decision to switch manufacturers from Toyota to Chevrolet immediately, with support from Childress. The spinoff also included development driver Cale Gale, who drove the No. 33 Rheem Chevrolet.

Other Changes

- ThorSport Racing switched to Toyota Tundras for the 2012 season, with the three teams of Matt Crafton (#88), Johnny Sauter (#13), and Dakoda Armstrong (#98) running for the full season.

Discontinued operations

- Germain Racing had shut down the No. 9 and No. 30 trucks with employees asked to look for other employment, as the team's Sprint Cup team changed to Ford from Toyota.

=== Driver changes ===
Changed teams

- Neither of the Kevin Harvick, Inc. drivers were retained by Eddie Sharp Racing after the spinoff. Ron Hornaday Jr. joined Joe Denette Motorsports and drive their No. 9 Chevrolet. He was reunited with KHI crew chief Jeff Hensley. Hornaday was not an exempt driver through the points standings during the first five races, but had an exemption through his status as a former Series Champion. (Series champions have an exemption available in certain circumstances.)
- Nelson Piquet Jr. moved to Turner Motorsports to contest the full Truck series season as well as a limited Nationwide schedule. Piquet Jr. was teammates with fellow Brazilian Miguel Paludo, who leaves Red Horse Racing.
- After enduring a disappointing season at Germain Racing, Brendan Gaughan moves to Richard Childress Racing to run 8 Truck races. Those races were in the No. 2 truck acquired in the Childress-Harvick merger.
- After Germain Racing shut down its Truck Series operations, Todd Bodine moves to Red Horse Racing to driving the No. 11 truck that was the No. 7 that Miguel Paludo drove. However, Bodine tweeted that he needed sponsorship to run the season.
- After a disappointing 2011, David Starr took the number 81 with him to the newly formed Arrington Racing formed by engine builder Joey Arrington.
- After a one-year stint with Joe Denette Motorsports, Jason White formed his own team for 2012 and fielded Fords.

Rookie entries

The Rookie of the Year standout would be Ty Dillon, the younger brother of 2011 Champion Austin Dillon. Ty scored a win at Atlanta and was in contention for the championship until a late crash at Homestead knocked him to 4th in the points but easily won him the RoTY title. Former Kevin Harvick, Inc. development driver Cale Gale was runner-up to Dillon, taking a pole at Bristol and a win at Homestead. Ross Chastain finished 3rd in the rookie battle, while John Wes Townley, despite missing Daytona, had two top-10s. Contenders Jeb Burton, Dakoda Armstrong, and Daytona winner John King saw their runs for RoTY aborted due to sponsorship issues. K&N Pro Series East Champion Max Gresham struggled with Joe Denette Motorsports and departed the team early on. Duke University graduate Paulie Harraka struggled most of the season with Wauters Motorsport and left before Atlanta.

Returned to the series

- Tim George Jr. returned to the Truck Series for the first time since 2009. He ran 12 races driving Richard Childress Racing's No. 2 truck inherited from Kevin Harvick, Inc.
- David Reutimann returns to the series for 4 races with RBR Enterprises.
- Ward Burton returned to NASCAR for the first time after a five-year absence, driving the season-opening Daytona race for Hillman Racing. His son Jeb would drive the following 4 races before a lack of sponsorship ended his run.

Exited the series

- Truck Series champion and former Rookie of the Year Austin Dillon moved up to the NASCAR Nationwide Series full-time with crew chief Danny Stockman.
- Johanna Long moved to the Nationwide Series for a limited schedule with ML Motorsports.
- Cole Whitt moved up to the NASCAR Nationwide series full-time in the 88 Chevrolet with JR Motorsports.

== 2012 calendar ==
No.	Race title	Track	Date
1	NextEra Energy Resources 250	Daytona International Speedway, Daytona Beach	24 February
2	Kroger 250	Martinsville Speedway, Ridgeway	31 March
3	Good Sam Roadside Assistance Carolina 200	Rockingham Speedway, Rockingham	15 April
4	SFP 250	Kansas Speedway, Kansas City	21 April
5	North Carolina Education Lottery 200	Charlotte Motor Speedway, Concord	18 May
6	Lucas Oil 200	Dover International Speedway, Dover	1 June
7	WinStar World Casino 400K	Texas Motor Speedway, Fort Worth	8 June
8	UNOH 225	Kentucky Speedway, Sparta	28 June
9	American Ethanol 200	Iowa Speedway, Newton	14 July
10	American Ethanol 225	Chicagoland Speedway, Joliet	21 July
11	Pocono Mountains 125	Pocono Raceway, Long Pond	4 August
12	VFW 200	Michigan International Speedway, Brooklyn	18 August
13	UNOH 200	Bristol Motor Speedway, Bristol	22 August
14	Jeff Foxworthy's Grit Chips 200	Atlanta Motor Speedway, Hampton	31 August
15	American Ethanol 200	Iowa Speedway, Newton	15 September
16	Kentucky 201	Kentucky Speedway, Sparta	21 September
17	Smith's 350	Las Vegas Motor Speedway, Las Vegas, Nevada	29 September
18	Fred's 250	Talladega Superspeedway, Talladega	6 October
19	Kroger 200	Martinsville Speedway, Ridgeway	27 October
20	WinStar World Casino 350K	Texas Motor Speedway, Fort Worth	2 November
21	Lucas Oil 150	Phoenix International Raceway, Phoenix	9 November
22	Ford EcoBoost 200	Homestead-Miami Speedway, Homestead	16 November

=== Calendar changes ===
The Las Vegas race, as a result of issues resulting from the 2011 race weekend, was moved back to late September as a stand-alone race. Originally, the Las Vegas race was set for 13 October at 12 noon PDT as part of the IndyCar weekend, but Indy Racing League LLC faces issues from the 2011 IZOD IndyCar World Championship which the 2011 Truck race was the Saturday feature of the race meet, but that meet was removed as a result of legal issues following the death of Dan Wheldon on Lap 11 of the IZOD IndyCar Series feature.

Speedway Motorsports also removed races from New Hampshire Motor Speedway, while keeping the second Kentucky truck date and having the NASCAR Nationwide Series replace INDYCAR on the fall weekend. Darlington was also removed from the schedule, both Nashville races, and Lucas Oil Motorsports Park. Chicagoland also moved to July. Kansas moved from June to April, along with the Cup series as their spring date was also moved to April to give more time for Kansas's new configuration project. Rockingham Speedway was added to the truck series schedule marking the first time since 2004 NASCAR has had a race at the track. The total of races on the schedule was also reduced from 25 to 22. Iowa Speedway also got a second date that was held in September.

== Results and standings ==
=== Races ===
No.	Race	Pole position	Most laps led	Winning driver	Winning manufacturer
1	NextEra Energy Resources 250	Miguel Paludo	Miguel Paludo	John King	Toyota
2	Kroger 250	Kevin Harvick	Kevin Harvick	Kevin Harvick	Chevrolet
3	Good Sam Roadside Assistance Carolina 200	Nelson Piquet Jr.	Nelson Piquet Jr.	Kasey Kahne	Chevrolet
4	SFP 250	Tim George Jr.	James Buescher	James Buescher	Chevrolet
5	North Carolina Education Lottery 200	Ty Dillon	Justin Lofton	Justin Lofton	Chevrolet
6	Lucas Oil 200	Kevin Harvick	Kevin Harvick	Todd Bodine	Toyota
7	WinStar World Casino 400K	Justin Lofton	Justin Lofton	Johnny Sauter	Toyota
8	UNOH 225	Matt Crafton	James Buescher	James Buescher	Chevrolet
9	American Ethanol 200	Timothy Peters	James Buescher	Timothy Peters	Toyota
10	American Ethanol 225	Justin Lofton	Brendan Gaughan	James Buescher	Chevrolet
11	Pocono Mountains 125	Nelson Piquet Jr.	Nelson Piquet Jr.	Joey Coulter	Chevrolet
12	VFW 200	Joey Coulter	Kurt Busch	Nelson Piquet Jr.	Chevrolet
13	UNOH 200	Cale Gale	Timothy Peters	Timothy Peters	Toyota
14	Jeff Foxworthy's Grit Chips 200	Ty Dillon	Kyle Busch	Ty Dillon	Chevrolet
15	American Ethanol 200	Parker Kligerman	Parker Kligerman	Ryan Blaney	Ram
16	Kentucky 201	Joey Coulter	James Buescher	James Buescher	Chevrolet
17	Smith's 350	Joey Coulter	Joey Coulter	Nelson Piquet Jr.	Chevrolet
18	Fred's 250	Ty Dillon	Ty Dillon	Parker Kligerman	Toyota
19	Kroger 200	Timothy Peters	Kevin Harvick	Denny Hamlin	Toyota
20	WinStar World Casino 350K	Nelson Piquet Jr.	Nelson Piquet Jr.	Johnny Sauter	Toyota
21	Lucas Oil 150	Nelson Piquet Jr.	Brian Scott	Brian Scott	Toyota
22	Ford EcoBoost 200	Parker Kligerman	Kyle Larson	Cale Gale	Chevrolet

=== Drivers' standings ===
(key) Bold – Pole position awarded by time. Italics – Pole position earned by points standings. * – Most laps led.

Pos	Driver	DAY	MAR	CAR	KAN	CLT	DOV	TEX	KEN	IOW	CHI	POC	MCH	BRI	ATL	IOW	KEN	LVS	TAL	MAR	TEX	PHO	HOM	Points
1	James Buescher	17	3	2	1*	22	7	15	1*	30*	1	2	5	7	3	17	1*	6	3	6	11	17	13	808
2	Timothy Peters	2	5	5	2	9	9	11	5	**1**	3	22	13	1**	13	19	21	8	5	**7**	10	4	8	802
3	Joey Coulter	18	30	6	14	7	11	3	7	8	15	1	**7**	4	7	13	**4**	**3***	14	3	7	3	3	789
4	Ty Dillon **(R)**	9	2	8	9	**10**	6	7	3	7	12	6	6	21	**1**	2	3	10	**4***	28	5	15	25	784
5	Parker Kligerman	11	11	9	8	11	2	10	19	10	5	7	4	2	4	**23***	2	19	1	9	2	27	**7**	778
6	Matt Crafton	23	24	3	12	15	8	2	**4**	3	4	4	16	9	9	9	9	2	18	4	6	20	12	759
7	Nelson Piquet Jr.	22	6	**7***	4	29	4	5	29	9	26	**3***	1	18	8	6	12	1	31	2	**3***	**8**	4	747
8	Justin Lofton	3	4	10	7	1*	10	9*	14	5	**21**	9	12	10	14	31	7	20	24	19	22	10	9	710
9	Johnny Sauter	24	29	4	24	25	24	1	6	4	22	27	11	11	12	4	6	21	2	14	1	25	6	678
10	Miguel Paludo	**30***	17	15	10	14	12	14	12	13	17	13	10	16	16	10	8	11	19	15	14	14	5	668
11	Jason White	5	10	24	19	6	33	17	11	14	9	11	2	14	29	12	20	13	20	13	19	21	17	635
12	Cale Gale **(R)**	32	15	17	11	19	5	8	25	26	6	14	20	**28**	15	5	19	7	10	35	15	7	1	634
13	Ron Hornaday Jr.	14	16	12	6	5	27	12	9	2	7	19	17	8	30	33	14	27	28	33	20	22	20	591
14	Todd Bodine	6	25	31	5	3	1	30	28	12	18	26	24	31	21	3	30	5	33	22	8	28	11	574
15	Ryan Sieg	15	32	22	29	28	29	19	16	17	30	29	15	12	17	14	22	22	11	26	13	6	14	531
16	John Wes Townley **(R)**		23	20	16	16	16	27	32	20	14	8	25	24	19	15	10	14	25	18	16	13	32	521
17	Ross Chastain **(R)**	28	7	25	34	35	15	16	33	16	13	10	18	3	20	11	28	25	34	23	31	33	10	502
18	Bryan Silas **(R)**	29	26	32	21	20	22	25	26	22	24	17	14	22	24	18	29	16	12	29	23	16	33	471
19	David Starr	21	14	13	31	17	14	13	15	28	10	Wth		13	18				22	16	21		16	423
20	Dakoda Armstrong **(R)**	35	21	14	15	13	20	18	13	27	16	12	3	30	23		31							370
21	Norm Benning	DNQ	DNQ	30	28	DNQ	25	22	DNQ	24	25	20	23	27	DNQ	25	15	18	15	31	26	19	29	346
22	Tim George Jr.			16	**17**				24	15		15	21		28	22	18		9	27			18	298
23	Jason Leffler	36	8	34	18	4		6	8	6	8												19	294
24	Max Gresham **(R)**	26	19	18	22	24	30	21	30						22		23			11	12		23	291
25	Chris Fontaine	7	DNQ	DNQ	20	32	23		20	25	27	18	29		26		34	29	29	36	DNQ	34		271
26	Ryan Blaney													6^{2}	11	1	11		6	8	30	5	28	258
27	Jennifer Jo Cobb	DNQ	34	DNQ	25	26	26	32	DNQ	29	23	36	22	DNQ	DNQ	30	16	28	27		27	DNQ	31	248
28	Paulie Harraka **(R)**	19	22	26	27	30	17	28	17	33	19	24												223
29	Jeff Agnew		35	27		DNQ	21		27	21		31		32			17			21	25		24	204
30	Caleb Holman **(R)**		DNQ	21		21	18		21	18				19	27					24				183
31	Brennan Newberry		28	23	32	27			22	36			19			21	27	23		DNQ				182
32	Chris Jones				35		31			35	31	34	33	33	31	34	33	33	21		36	35	35	170
33	John King **(R)**	1	9	33	13	33											25					29		169
34	Clay Greenfield	10	31	DNQ		36			18		28			34				34	16	25				164
35	Kyle Larson								10						6							2	27	134
36	Jeb Burton **(R)**		13	11	36	8	19																	133
37	Jake Crum	DNQ	18			23			31					29			13			DNQ			22	128
38	Dennis Setzer				DNQ	34	35^{1}		35	19	33^{1}	28	31	35	36	36^{1}	35^{1}	31		DNQ	35	32		124
39	Johnny Chapman			35		DNQ	32	31	DNQ		36		26	36	32		32	30	32					119
40	Germán Quiroga																		8		28	24	15	101
41	Rick Crawford	25	36					29			11								23					96
42	Chad McCumbee				30	31					20			23	25									92
43	Jeff Choquette									11						8						30		83
44	Chris Cockrum	16	27	29	26																			78
45	Tyler Young **(R)**			28					23					20						30				75
46	Grant Enfinger	12		36										DNQ				12		DNQ				73
47	C. E. Falk								34		29	16												53
48	Dusty Davis **(R)**	13	33																				34	52
49	Travis Miller									31							24	26					26^{1}	51
50	B. J. McLeod		DNQ			DNQ		23						15				32^{1}			33^{1}			50
51	Chris Lafferty		DNQ					34^{1}	DNQ	34	DNQ	35				35		24						48
52	Justin Jennings									23						20								45
53	Russ Dugger				33									26							29			44
54	Matt Merrell																			34		11		43
55	J. R. Fitzpatrick	34	12																					42
56	Todd Peck									DNQ						28				DNQ		18		42
57	Scott Stenzel				23			24																41
58	Wes Burton	DNQ		DNQ		DNQ	28					23							DNQ					37
59	Ward Burton	8																						36
60	Ryan Lynch															29							30	29
61	Ryan Reed																	17						27
62	Ryan Hackett																		17					27
63	Brandon McReynolds																				18			26
64	Brandon Knupp							35				30^{1}	27	DNQ					36^{1}					26
65	Peyton Sellers																			20				24
66	Mario Gosselin																						21	23
67	Wayne Edwards															24								20
68	Sean Corr											25											DNQ	19
69	Benjamin Reynolds									DNQ						26						DNQ		18
70	Brian Weber			DNQ																		26		18
71	Brent Raymer							26																18
72	August Grill															27								17
73	T. J. Duke **(R)**	31																						13
74	Caleb Roark	DNQ														32								12
75	Todd Shafer									32														12
76	Adam Edwards											33												11
	Brandon Miller							20^{1}																0
	Kyle Martel											21^{1}												0
	Natalie Sather		DNQ							DNQ														0
	Wheeler Boys	DNQ																						0
	Tyler Tanner		DNQ																					0
Ineligible for Camping World Truck championship points
Pos	Driver	DAY	MAR	ROC	KAN	CHA	DOV	TXS	KTY	IOW	CHI	POC	MIC	BRI	ATL	IO2	KT2	LSV	TAL	MA2	TX2	PHO	HOM	Points
	Kevin Harvick		**1***				**3***													12*				
	Brian Scott						13							17			5			10		1*		
	Denny Hamlin											5								1				
	Kasey Kahne			1																				
	Brad Keselowski	27			3	2			2				8	25										
	Kyle Busch														2*						4		2	
	Brendan Gaughan	20				12		4			2*			5				4			17	23		
	Travis Kvapil	4																						
	Aric Almirola														5				26		9			
	Scott Riggs				DNQ				36			32	32		33					5	34			
	Kurt Busch												9*		10				7					
	Drew Herring															7								
	David Mayhew															16	26	9			24	12		
	Ryan Truex																			32		9		
	Cole Whitt																		13					
	Travis Pastrana																	15						
	Josh Richards																			17				
	David Reutimann	DNQ	20	19		18																		
	Mike Harmon						34	33			DNQ		28						35				DNQ	
	Stephen Leicht												30		34						32	31		
	Donnie Neuenberger																		30					
	Blake Koch										32			QL	35		36			Wth	DNQ	36	36	
	Mike Skinner	33																						
	T. J. Bell										34		35											
	Josh Wise												34											
	Jeff Green										35				DNQ									
	Derek White	DNQ																						
	Tim Andrews																DNQ							
Pos	Driver	DAY	MAR	CAR	KAN	CLT	DOV	TEX	KEN	IOW	CHI	POC	MCH	BRI	ATL	IOW	KEN	LVS	TAL	MAR	TEX	PHO	HOM	Points

- ^{1} – Post entry, driver and owner did not score points.
- ^{2} – Ryan Blaney was originally registered for Nationwide points, but switched to the Trucks at Atlanta.

=== Manufacturer ===
Pos	Manufacturer	Wins	Points
1	Chevrolet	12	**166**
2	Toyota	9	**151**
3	Ram	1	**93**
4	Ford	0	**74**

== See also ==
- 2012 NASCAR Sprint Cup Series
- 2012 NASCAR Nationwide Series
- 2012 NASCAR K&N Pro Series East
- 2012 ARCA Racing Series
- 2012 NASCAR Whelen Modified Tour
- 2012 NASCAR Whelen Southern Modified Tour
- 2012 NASCAR Canadian Tire Series
- 2012 NASCAR Toyota Series
- 2012 NASCAR Stock V6 Series
- 2012 Racecar Euro Series
