= Glenden Enterprises =

American stock car racing team

- Owner: Chris Fontaine
- Base: Lakeland, Florida
- Series: NASCAR Gander RV & Outdoors Truck Series
- Race drivers: Chris Fontaine
- Manufacturer: Toyota

Career
- Debut: Truck Series: 2009 Kroger 250 (Martinsville)
- Latest race: Truck Series: 2019 NextEra Energy 250 (Daytona)
- Races competed: 54
- Drivers' Championships: 0
- Race victories: 0
- Pole positions: 0

Glenden Enterprises is an American professional stock car racing team which has competed in the NASCAR Craftsman Truck Series. The team is owned by Chris Fontaine, who has fielded the No. 47 Toyota Tundra for himself in select superspeedway races.

== Gander Outdoors Truck Series ==
=== Truck No. 45 history ===
Fontaine debuted with this number at Eldora Speedway in 2015, finishing 16th. (Christopher Long is listed as the owner for that race.) Fontaine returned with it at Talladega, where he turned in an eighth-place finish.

==== Truck No. 45 results ====
Year	Driver	No.	Make	1	2	3	4	5	6	7	8	9	10	11	12	13	14	15	16	17	18	19	20	21	22	23	Owners	Pts
2015	Chris Fontaine	45	Toyota	DAY	ATL	MAR	KAN	CLT	DOV	TEX	GTW	IOW	KEN	ELD	POC	MCH	BRI	MSP	CHI	NHA	LVS	TAL; 8	MAR	TEX	PHO	HOM	29th	277

=== Truck No. 47 history ===
Chris Fontaine attempted the 2017 NextEra Energy Resources 250 in this number, failing to qualify for the race. Fontaine ran the No. 47 again at Talladega, finishing 26th after an accident on lap 70. Fontaine ran the No. 47 again in 2018 and 2019.

==== Truck No. 47 results ====
Year	Driver	No.	Make	1	2	3	4	5	6	7	8	9	10	11	12	13	14	15	16	17	18	19	20	21	22	23	Owners	Pts
2017	Chris Fontaine	47	Toyota	DAY; DNQ	ATL	MAR	KAN	CLT	DOV	TEX	GTW	IOW	KEN	ELD	POC	MCH	BRI	MSP	CHI	NHA	LVS	TAL; 26	MAR	TEX	PHO	HOM	54th	11
2018	Chris Fontaine	47	Chevy	DAY; 29	ATL	LVS	MAR	DOV	KAN	CLT	TEX	IOW	GTW	CHI	KEN	ELD	POC	MCH	BRI	MSP	LVS	TAL; 24	MAR	TEX	PHO	HOM	53rd	21
2019	Chris Fontaine	47	Toyota	DAY; 27	ATL	LVS	MAR	TEX	DOV	KAN	CLT	TEX	IOW	GTW	CHI	KEN	POC	ELD	MCH	BRI	MSP	LVS	TAL	MAR	PHO	HOM	57th	10

=== Truck No. 78 history ===
This number first showed up at Daytona in 2016, as Fontaine crashed out five laps from the end. Two races later, he failed to qualify with this number at Martinsville Speedway.

==== Truck No. 78 results ====
Year	Driver	No.	Make	1	2	3	4	5	6	7	8	9	10	11	12	13	14	15	16	17	18	19	20	21	22	23	Owners	Pts
2016	Chris Fontaine	78	Toyota	DAY; 22	ATL	MAR; DNQ	KAN	DOV	CLT	TEX	IOW	GTW	KEN	ELD; DNQ	POC	BRI	MCH	MSP	CHI	NHA	LVS	TAL; 23	MAR	TEX	PHO	HOM	42nd	21

=== Truck No. 83 history ===
Brandon Duchscherer ran this truck in one race in 2009, at O'Reilly Raceway Park. However, he retired with overheating after twelve laps in the first race that Glenden Enterprises fielded two trucks. Team owner Fontaine attempted one race with this number in 2012, at Texas Motor Speedway when Russ Dugger was in the 84. However, he failed to qualify.

==== Truck No. 83 results ====
Year	Driver	No.	Make	1	2	3	4	5	6	7	8	9	10	11	12	13	14	15	16	17	18	19	20	21	22	23	24	25	Owners	Pts
2009	Brandon Duchscherer	83	Chevy	DAY	CAL	ATL	MAR	KAN	CLT	DOV	TEX	MCH	MLW	MEM	KEN	IRP; 34	NSH	BRI; DNQ	CHI	IOW	GTW	NHA	LVS	MAR	TAL	TEX	PHO	HOM	77th	49
2012	Chris Fontaine	83	Chevy	DAY	MAR	CAR	KAN	CLT	DOV	TEX	KEN	IOW	CHI	POC	MCH	BRI	ATL	IOW	KEN	LVS	TAL	MAR	TEX; DNQ	PHO	HOM				69th	0
2013	Chris Fontaine	83	Toyota	DAY	MAR	CAR	KAN	CLT	DOV	TEX	KEN	IOW	ELD	POC	MCH	BRI	MSP	IOW	CHI	LVS	TAL; 15	MAR	TEX	PHO	HOM				55th	30

=== Truck No. 84 history ===
Fontaine ran this truck in Glenden Enterprises' debut races, the 2009 Kroger 250. He finished 20th, one lap down. The truck ran in seven more races that year, all with Fontaine. He recorded a best finish of 13th in the Copart 200, and finished all but one race. In 2010, Fontaine ran seven races with this truck, scoring a best finish of 13th at Chicagoland Speedway. He failed to finish at Talladega when ignition problems made him retire just three laps from the finish. That race was also the first race that a Glenden Enterprises driver had led a lap, as Fontaine paced the field for 15 circuits. 2011 brought a litany of mishaps for the team, as Fontaine only finished two of the six races he ran in the No. 84. Wrecks ended his day at Daytona and Talladega. Then, in the midst of the start and park boom, he did just that for two races, finishing 33rd at Kentucky Speedway and 27th at Pocono Raceway. The two races that Fontaine was running at the end were at Atlanta Motor Speedway, with a 27th-place finish, and at Charlotte Motor Speedway, with an 18th-place finish. In 2012, the team competed in the majority of the races on the schedule, with Fontaine driving fifteen, Russ Dugger driving two, and Wayne Edwards, B. J. McLeod, and Mario Gosselin running one race apiece. The team started off with a bang, with Fontaine scoring the team's first top ten finish, a seventh, at Daytona. He continued to drive until McLeod drove at Texas, finishing 23rd. The next driver other than Fontaine to drive was Dugger, who drove the truck at Bristol. Fontaine took over for one race but then handed it off to Edwards, who drove home 24th at Iowa. Fontaine then returned to the truck, and he drove four more races until Dugger drove the truck at Texas. Rear gear problems forced him to retire early in that race. Team owner Fontaine also start and parked for two races, before Gosselin drove the final race at Homestead-Miami. He finished 21st in the race, two laps down. In 2013, Fontaine scaled back to just restrictor plate races, crashing out at Daytona and finishing 15th at Talladega. Running the same schedule in 2014, Fontaine tied his best finish of seventh at Talladega. The season-opening NextEra Energy Resources 250 at Daytona in 2015 was run with the 84, but a crash relegated him to 25th.

==== Truck No. 84 results ====
Year	Driver	No.	Make	1	2	3	4	5	6	7	8	9	10	11	12	13	14	15	16	17	18	19	20	21	22	23	24	25	Owners	Pts
2009	Chris Fontaine	84	Chevy	DAY	CAL	ATL	MAR; 20	KAN	CLT	DOV; 14	TEX	MCH; 15	MLW	MEM; 27	KEN	IRP; 21	NSH	BRI; 23	CHI	IOW	GTW; 13	NHA	LVS	MAR; 17	TAL	TEX	PHO	HOM	33rd	859
2010	Chris Fontaine	84	Chevy	DAY	ATL; 17	MAR	NSH; 28	KAN	DOV; 17	CLT	TEX	MCH; 17	IOW	GTY	IRP	POC; 21	NSH	DAR	BRI	CHI; 13	KEN	NHA	LVS	MAR					39th	638
2010	Chris Fontaine	84	Toyota																						TAL; 19	TEX	PHO	HOM	39th	638
2011	Chris Fontaine	84	Toyota	DAY; 19	PHO																				TAL; 25	MAR	TEX	HOM	43rd	98
2011	Chris Fontaine	84	Chevy			DAR; DNQ	MAR	NSH	DOV	CLT; 18	KAN	TEX	KEN; 33	IOW	NSH	IRP	POC; 27	MCH	BRI	ATL; 27	CHI	NHA	KEN	LVS					43rd	98
2012	Chris Fontaine	84	Toyota	DAY; 7																	TAL; 29								26th	368
2012	Chris Fontaine	84	Chevy		MAR; DNQ	CAR; DNQ	KAN; 20	CLT; 32	DOV; 23		KEN; 20	IOW; 25	CHI; 27	POC; 18	MCH; 29		ATL; 26		KEN; 34	LVS; 29		MAR; 36		PHO; 34					26th	368
2012	B. J. McLeod	84	Chevy							TEX; 23																			26th	368
2012	Russ Dugger	84	Chevy													BRI; 26							TEX; 29						26th	368
2012	Wayne Edwards	84	Chevy															IOW; 24											26th	368
2012	Mario Gosselin	84	Chevy																						HOM; 21				26th	368
2013	Chris Fontaine	84	Toyota	DAY; 34	MAR	CAR	KAN	CLT	DOV	TEX	KEN	IOW	ELD	POC	MCH	BRI	MSP	IOW	CHI	LVS	TAL	MAR	TEX	PHO	HOM				28th	311
2014	Chris Fontaine	84	Toyota	DAY; 19	MAR	KAN	CLT	DOV	TEX	GTW	KEN	IOW	ELD	POC	MCH	BRI	MSP	CHI	NHA	LVS	TAL; 7	MAR	TEX	PHO	HOM				42nd	62
2015	Chris Fontaine	84	Toyota	DAY; 25	ATL	MAR	KAN	CLT	DOV	TEX	GTW	IOW	KEN	ELD	POC	MCH	BRI	MSP	CHI	NHA	LVS	TAL	MAR	TEX	PHO	HOM			60th	0
