= Brandon Knupp =

American racing driver (born 1986)

- Born: February 2, 1986 (age 40); Sidney, Ohio, U.S.

NASCAR O'Reilly Auto Parts Series career
- 0 races run over 1 year
Wins	Top tens	Poles
0	0	0

NASCAR FedEx Freight Truck Series career
- 27 races run over 4 years
- Best finish: 23rd (2009)
- First race: 2007 Chevy Silverado HD 250 (Daytona)
- Last race: 2012 Fred's 250 (Talladega)
Wins	Top tens	Poles
0	0	0

Brandon Knupp (born February 2, 1986) is an American former stock car racing driver. He last competed in the NASCAR Camping World Truck Series.

== Racing career ==
Knupp competed in 27 NASCAR Gander Outdoors Truck Series races between 2007 and 2012. His best career finish was an 18th at Daytona International Speedway in 2007.

Knupp also competed in a total of 51 ARCA Racing Series events between 2004 and 2008, reaching the top-ten eight times.

Knupp also attempted one NASCAR Nationwide Series event, driving the No. 75 Chevrolet for Bob Schacht Motorsports but due to a crash in practice he withdrew.

== Motorsports career results ==
=== NASCAR ===
(key) (Bold – Pole position awarded by qualifying time. Italics – Pole position earned by points standings or practice time. * – Most laps led.)

==== Nationwide Series ====
NASCAR Nationwide Series results
Year	Team	No.	Make	1	2	3	4	5	6	7	8	9	10	11	12	13	14	15	16	17	18	19	20	21	22	23	24	25	26	27	28	29	30	31	32	33	34	35	NNSC	Pts	Ref
2009	Bob Schacht Motorsports	75	Chevy	DAY	CAL	LVS	BRI	TEX	NSH	PHO	TAL	RCH	DAR	CLT; Wth	DOV	NSH	KEN	MLW	NHA	DAY	CHI	GTY	IRP	IOW	GLN	MCH	BRI	CGV	ATL	RCH	DOV	KAN	CAL	CLT	MEM	TEX	PHO	HOM	N/A	–	

==== Camping World Truck Series ====
NASCAR Camping World Truck Series results
Year	Team	No.	Make	1	2	3	4	5	6	7	8	9	10	11	12	13	14	15	16	17	18	19	20	21	22	23	24	25	NGOTC	Pts	Ref
2007	Rosenblum Racing	28	Chevy	DAY; 18	CAL	ATL	MAR	KAN	CLT	MFD	DOV					KEN; 36	IRP												86th	109	
2007	Green Light Racing	0	Chevy									TEX; 34	MCH	MLW	MEM														86th	109	
2007	Green Light Racing	06	Chevy															NSH; 35	BRI	GTW	NHA	LVS	TAL	MAR	ATL	TEX	PHO	HOM	86th	109	
2008	SS-Green Light Racing	07	Chevy	DAY	CAL	ATL	MAR	KAN	CLT	MFD	DOV	TEX	MCH	MLW	MEM	KEN	IRP	NSH; 31	BRI	GTW	NHA	LVS	TAL	MAR	ATL	TEX	PHO	HOM	100th	70	
2009	Fast Track Racing	47	Chevy	DAY; 31	CAL; 32	ATL; 31	MAR			DOV; 34	TEX; 32	MCH; 29	MLW; 30	MEM; 30	KEN; 28	IRP	NSH; 28	BRI	CHI; 30	IOW	GTW; 29		LVS; 28	MAR; 36	TAL; 34	TEX; 31	PHO	HOM	23rd	1345	
2009	Fast Track Racing	48	Chevy					KAN; 27	CLT; 28																				23rd	1345	
2009	SS-Green Light Racing	08	Chevy																			NHA; 36							23rd	1345	
2012	Hillman Racing	27	Chevy	DAY	MAR	CAR	KAN	CLT	DOV	TEX; 35	KEN	IOW	CHI		MCH; 27														64th	26	
2012	Hillman Racing	25	Chevy											POC; 30							TAL; 36	MAR	TEX	PHO	HOM				64th	26	
2012	JJC Racing	0	Ford													BRI; DNQ	ATL	IOW	KEN	LVS									64th	26	

=== ARCA Re/Max Series ===
(key) (Bold – Pole position awarded by qualifying time. Italics – Pole position earned by points standings or practice time. * – Most laps led.)

ARCA Re/Max Series results
Year	Team	No.	Make	1	2	3	4	5	6	7	8	9	10	11	12	13	14	15	16	17	18	19	20	21	22	23	ARSC	Pts	Ref
2004	Fast Track Racing	4	Ford	DAY; DNQ																							13th	3980	
2004	Fast Track Racing	1	Ford		NSH; 11	SLM; 4	KEN; 38	TOL; 24	CLT; 41	KAN; 18	POC; 19	MCH; 18	SBO; 21	BLN; 15	KEN; 17	GTW; 22	POC; 10	LER; 16	NSH; 31								13th	3980	
2004	MK Racing	96	Ford																	ISF; 17	TOL; 10	DSF; 14	CHI; 24	SLM; 18			13th	3980	
2004	Capital City Motorsports	38	Ford																						TAL; 38		13th	3980	
2005	MK Racing	96	Ford	DAY; DNQ	NSH; 5	SLM; 33	KEN; 10	TOL; 26	LAN; 7	MIL; 20	POC; 21	MCH; 16	KAN; 11	KEN; 18	BLN; 13	POC; 12	GTW; 9	LER; 32	NSH; 21	MCH; 11	ISF; 6	TOL; 23	DSF; 11	CHI; 20	SLM; 19	TAL; 15	6th	4545	
2006	MK Racing	96	Ford	DAY; 41	NSH; 24	SLM; 24	WIN; 19	KEN; 21	TOL	POC	MCH	KAN	KEN	BLN	POC	GTW	NSH; 29	MCH	ISF	MIL	TOL	DSF	CHI	SLM	TAL	IOW	45th	845	
2008	Bob Schacht Motorsports	54	Ford	DAY	SLM	IOW	KAN	CAR; 49	KEN	TOL	POC	MCH	CAY	KEN	BLN	POC											94th	200	
2008	MK Racing	96	Ford														NSH; 12	ISF	DSF	CHI	SLM	NJE	TAL	TOL			94th	200	
