= John King (racing driver) =

American racing driver (born 1988)

- Born: April 1, 1988 (age 38); Fort Blackmore, Virginia, U.S.

NASCAR FedEx Freight Truck Series career
- 16 races run over 5 years
- 2014 position: 75th
- Best finish: 33rd (2012)
- First race: 2010 O'Reilly 200 (Bristol)
- Last race: 2014 NextEra Energy Resources 250 (Daytona)
- First win: 2012 NextEra Energy Resources 250 (Daytona)
Wins	Top tens	Poles
1	2	0
- Statistics up to date as of February 21, 2014.

John King II (born April 1, 1988) is an American professional stock car racing driver.

== Early career ==
Born in Fort Blackmore, Virginia, King grew up in Kingsport, Tennessee. King began his racing career in 2006, competing in local late model series in eastern Tennessee and southwestern Virginia; in 2007, he participated in the Fastrak Racing Series Grand Nationals, finishing in the top 30 among over 200 drivers entered in the three-race series.

In 2009, King moved up to the UARA-STARS Late Model Series, as part of his participation in the Bill Elliott Driver Development Program.

During his early career, King scored two wins in all series combined, one on a dirt track and the other on an asphalt course.

== NASCAR ==
King made his debut in the NASCAR Camping World Truck Series in 2010, competing at Bristol Motor Speedway and finishing fifteenth. He made six additional starts in the Camping World Truck Series through 2010 and 2011 before signing with Red Horse Racing to drive the team's No. 7 truck for the 2012 season. Chad Kendrick is the No. 7 truck's crew chief.

King started the 2012 season by winning the series' biggest race, the NextEra Energy Resources 250 at Daytona International Speedway, leading a one-two finish by Red Horse Racing as teammate Timothy Peters finished second. King had been involved in two crashes over the course of the race, one of them taking out then-leader Johnny Sauter; the event ran through three attempted green–white–checkered finishs before ending under the yellow flag. The win came in King's eighth start in the series, and King stated that the win was only the third of his entire career.

Following a ninth-place finish in the season's second race at Martinsville Speedway, King struggled in the following three events, crashing twice; following the May race at Charlotte Motor Speedway, Red Horse Racing announced that it was indefinitely suspending operations of the No. 7 truck, due to a lack of sponsorship, leaving King out of a ride.

In September 2012, King returned to the Camping World Truck Series, driving the No. 5 truck for Wauters Motorsports at Kentucky Speedway.

In 2013, King drove for Eddie Sharp Racing in the season-opening race at Daytona, finishing eighteenth.

In February 2014, King announced that he would drive for NTS Motorsports with sponsorship from GunBroker.com in the season-opening Truck Series race at Daytona that month, finishing 23rd.

== Motorsports career results ==
=== NASCAR ===
(key) (Bold – Pole position awarded by qualifying time. Italics – Pole position earned by points standings or practice time. * – Most laps led.)

==== Camping World Truck Series ====
NASCAR Camping World Truck Series results
Year	Team	No.	Make	1	2	3	4	5	6	7	8	9	10	11	12	13	14	15	16	17	18	19	20	21	22	23	24	25	NCWTC	Pts	Ref
2010	Team Gill Racing	46	Ford	DAY	ATL	MAR	NSH	KAN	DOV	CLT	TEX	MCH	IOW	GTY	IRP	POC	NSH	DAR	BRI; 15	CHI	KEN	NHA; 28	LVS						57th	385	
2010	SS-Green Light Racing	07	Chevy																					MAR; 19	TAL	TEX	PHO		57th	385	
2010	SS-Green Light Racing	07	Ford																									HOM; 27	57th	385	
2011	John King Racing	16	Ford	DAY	PHO	DAR	MAR	NSH; DNQ	DOV	CLT	KAN	TEX																	57th	46	
2011	John King Racing	16	Toyota										KEN; 28	IOW	NSH	IRP	POC	MCH											57th	46	
2011	SS-Green Light Racing	07	Toyota																BRI; 32	ATL	CHI	NHA	KEN; 27	LVS	TAL	MAR	TEX	HOM	57th	46	
2012	Red Horse Racing	7	Toyota	DAY; 1	MAR; 9	CAR; 33	KAN; 13	CLT; 33	DOV	TEX	KEN	IOW	CHI	POC	MCH	BRI	ATL	IOW											33rd	169	
2012	Wauters Motorsports	5	Ford																KEN; 25	LVS	TAL	MAR	TEX	PHO; 29	HOM				33rd	169	
2013	Eddie Sharp Racing	33	Chevy	DAY; 18	MAR	CAR	KAN	CLT	DOV	TEX	KEN	IOW	ELD	POC	MCH	BRI	MSP	IOW	CHI	LVS	TAL	MAR	TEX	PHO	HOM				60th	26	
2014	NTS Motorsports	20	Chevy	DAY; 23	MAR	KAN	CHA	DOV	TEX	GTW	KEN	IOW	ELD	POC	MCH	BRI	MSP	CHI	NHA	LVS	TAL	MAR	TEX	PHO	HOM				75th	21	

^{*} Season still in progress
^{1} Ineligible for series points
