= Tim George Jr. =

American racing driver

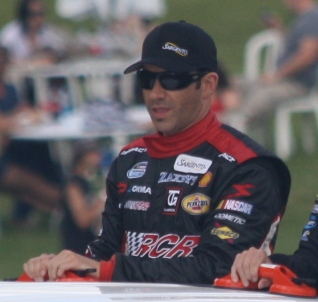
- George at the 2010 Nationwide race at Road America
- Born: December 21, 1980 (age 45); Manhattan, New York, U.S.
- Awards: 2008 Rolex Sports Car Series Rookie of the Year

NASCAR O'Reilly Auto Parts Series career
- 4 races run over 2 years
- Best finish: 58th (2011)
- First race: 2010 Bucyrus 200 (Road America)
- Last race: 2011 Zippo 200 (Watkins Glen)
Wins	Top tens	Poles
0	0	0

NASCAR FedEx Freight Truck Series career
- 24 races run over 4 years
- 2013 position: 26th
- Best finish: 22nd (2012)
- First race: 2009 Lucas Oil 150 (Phoenix)
- Last race: 2013 Pocono Mountains 125 (Pocono)
Wins	Top tens	Poles
0	1	1
- Statistics up to date as of August 3, 2013.

Tim George Jr. (born December 21, 1980) is an American former professional stock car racing driver.

== Personal life and early career ==
George was born on Manhattan's Upper East Side in 1980 as the son of investment banker Timothy M. George. George Sr. is the treasurer of the Philharmonic-Symphony Society of New York, Inc. (aka the New York Philharmonic) and founded the Potomac Family Dining Group, which owns several Applebee's franchises. He also served as an executive for JPMorgan Chase and Goldman Sachs.

George began his racing career in 2005. Employed at the time as a chef in a New York–based Italian restaurant, he was catering at a sports-car racing event at the road course at Lime Rock Park in Connecticut, and when he was criticized by the head chef for having modified a recipe, he took a break to watch the cars race. He soon enrolled in racing school, and first competed in the 2005 Skip Barber Racing School Southern Series. He raced in the Grand-Am Rolex Sports Car Series for TRG Motorsports in 2007 and 2008, winning the 2008 Rookie of the Year award and one race, at New Jersey Motorsports Park, before moving to full-time stock-car racing. He is single.

== Stock car career ==
Though only completing two events in the actual NASCAR series, George competed in the ARCA Racing Series starting in 2008, driving at first for TRG Motorsports, then for Eddie Sharp Racing before joining Richard Childress Racing at the start of the 2010 season. He scored his first win in the series at Pocono Raceway in a rain-shortened event in the summer of 2011, leading only the last two laps before the race was called due to rain, darkness, and fog. He finished seventh in season points in 2011, his best career points finish in the ARCA Racing Series.

George made occasional starts in the NASCAR-sanctioned Nationwide Series and Camping World Truck Series during the 2009, 2010 and 2011 seasons. His first start in the Truck Series was at Phoenix International Raceway in 2009, and his first Nationwide Series start was at Road America in 2010. He attempted to qualify for the 2011 season-ending Ford 200 in the Camping World Truck Series, driving for RCR in conjunction with Eddie Sharp Racing, but failed to qualify when time trials were rained out.

George competed part-time in the Camping World Truck Series for Richard Childress Racing in 2012, driving for the team's with Applebee's sponsorship in twelve races over the course of the season. After finishing 22nd in points, he returned to the series in 2013, driving for Wauters Motorsports.

== Images ==
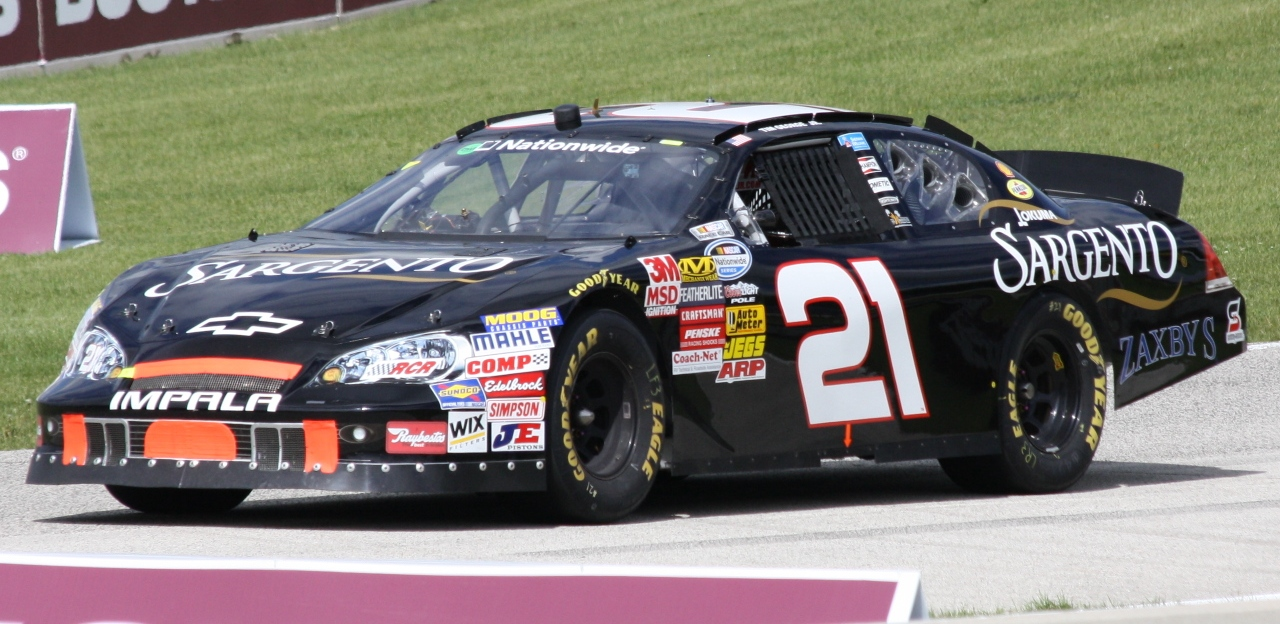
George's 2010 Nationwide car at Road America

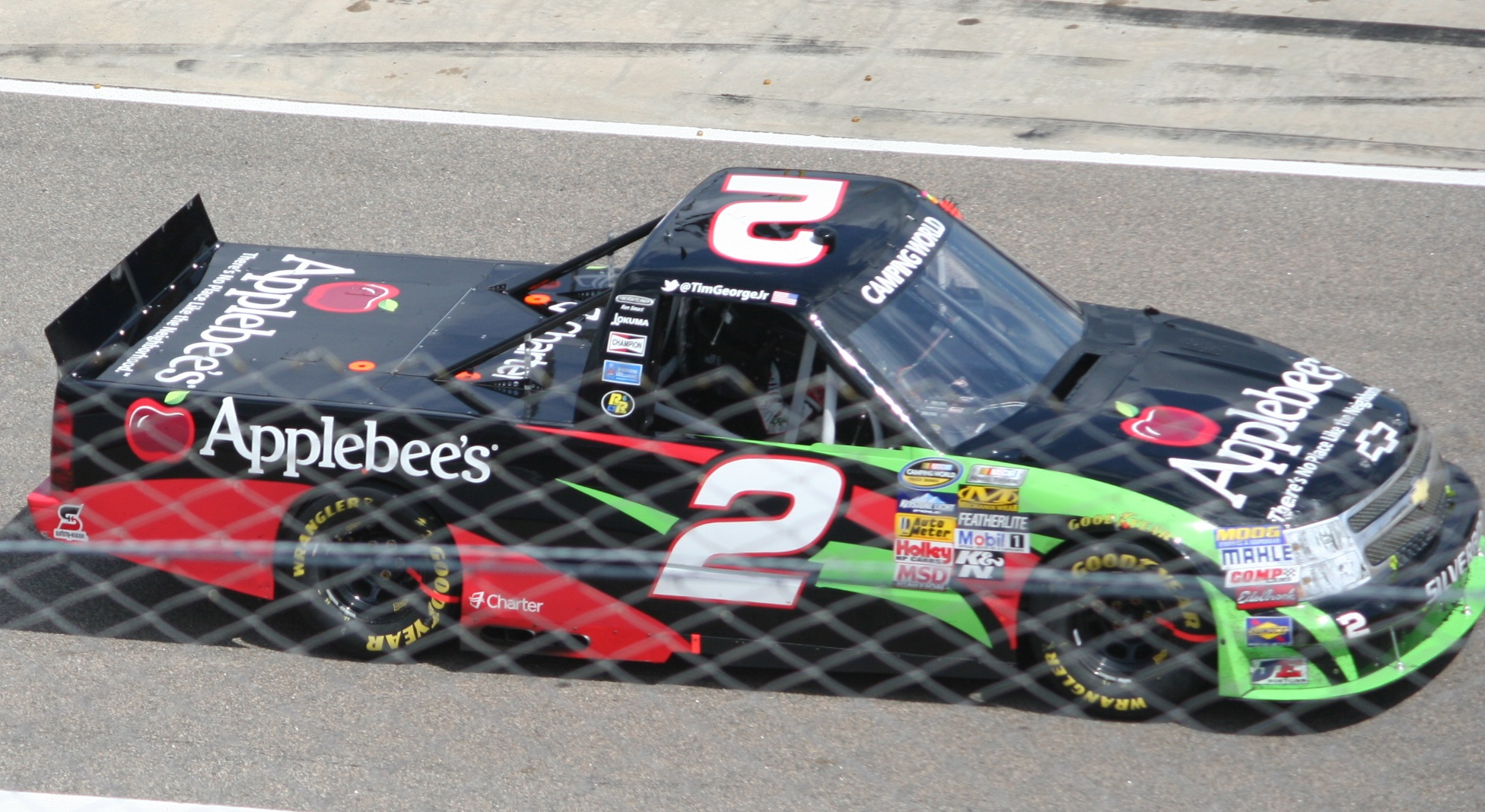
George's 2012 truck at Rockingham Speedway

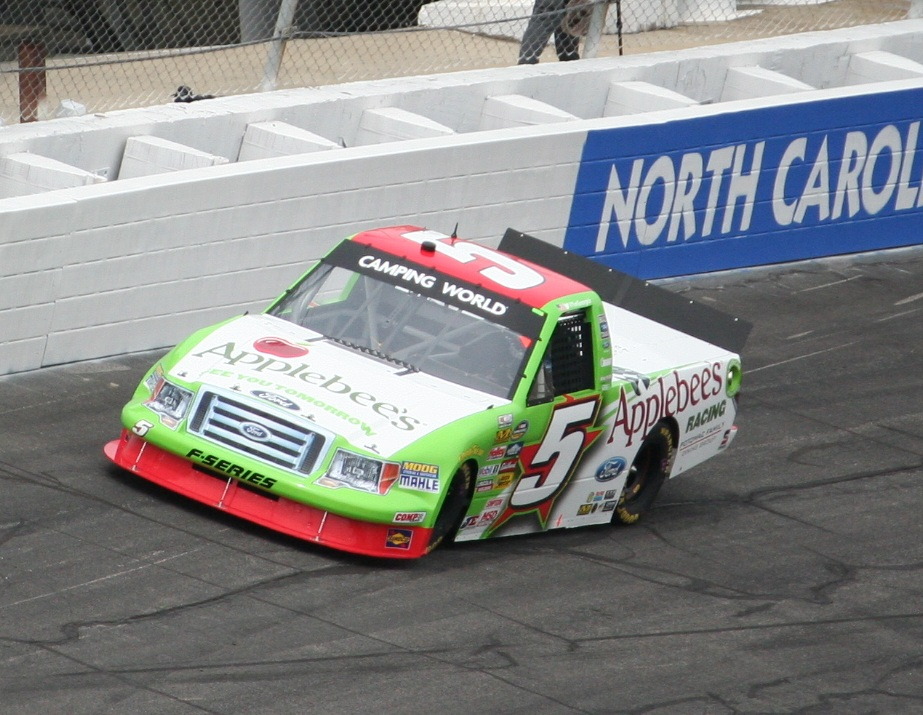
George's 2013 truck at Rockingham

== Motorsports career results ==
=== NASCAR ===
(key) (Bold – Pole position awarded by qualifying time. Italics – Pole position earned by points standings or practice time. * – Most laps led.)

==== Nationwide Series ====
NASCAR Nationwide Series results
Year	Team	No.	Make	1	2	3	4	5	6	7	8	9	10	11	12	13	14	15	16	17	18	19	20	21	22	23	24	25	26	27	28	29	30	31	32	33	34	35	NNSC	Pts	Ref
2010	Richard Childress Racing	21	Chevy	DAY	CAL	LVS	BRI	NSH	PHO	TEX	TAL	RCH	DAR	DOV	CLT	NSH	KEN	ROA; 32	NHA	DAY	CHI	GTY	IRP	IOW	GLN	MCH	BRI	CGV	ATL	RCH	DOV	KAN	CAL	CLT	GTY	TEX	PHO	HOM	130th	67	
2011	Richard Childress Racing	21	Chevy	DAY	PHO	LVS	BRI	CAL	TEX	TAL; 36	NSH	RCH	DAR	DOV	IOW	CLT	CHI	MCH	ROA	DAY; 21	KEN	NHA	NSH	IRP	IOW	GLN; 21	CGV; DNQ	BRI	ATL	RCH	CHI	DOV	KAN	CLT	TEX	PHO	HOM		58th	54	

==== Camping World Truck Series ====
NASCAR Camping World Truck Series results
Year	Team	No.	Make	1	2	3	4	5	6	7	8	9	10	11	12	13	14	15	16	17	18	19	20	21	22	23	24	25	NCWTC	Pts	Ref
2009	Richard Childress Racing	22	Chevy	DAY	CAL	ATL	MAR	KAN	CLT	DOV	TEX	MCH	MLW	MEM	KEN	IRP	NSH	BRI	CHI	IOW	GTW	NHA	LVS	MAR	TAL	TEX	PHO; 29	HOM	102nd	76	
2010	Richard Childress Racing	22	Chevy	DAY	ATL	MAR	NSH	KAN	DOV	CLT	TEX	MCH	IOW	GTY	IRP	POC	NSH	DAR	BRI	CHI	KEN	NHA	LVS	MAR	TAL	TEX	PHO; 23	HOM	100th	97	
2011	Eddie Sharp Racing	45	Chevy	DAY	PHO	DAR	MAR	NSH	DOV	CLT	KAN	TEX	KEN	IOW	NSH	IRP	POC	MCH	BRI	ATL	CHI	NHA	KEN	LVS	TAL	MAR	TEX	HOM; DNQ	NA	0^{1}	
2012	Richard Childress Racing	2	Chevy	DAY	MAR	CAR; 16	**KAN**; 17	CLT	DOV	TEX	KEN; 24	IOW; 15	CHI	POC; 15	MCH; 21	BRI	ATL; 28	IOW; 22	KEN; 18	LVS	TAL; 9				HOM; 18				22nd	298	
2012	RSS Racing	93	Chevy																			MAR; 27	TEX	PHO					22nd	298	
2013	Wauters Motorsports	5	Ford	DAY; 16	MAR; 22	CAR; 18	KAN; 14																						26th	252	
2013	Wauters Motorsports	5	Chevy					CLT; 16	DOV; 25	TEX; 21	KEN; 18	IOW; 23	ELD	POC; 16	MCH	BRI	MSP	IOW	CHI	LVS	TAL	MAR	TEX	PHO	HOM				26th	252	

==== K&N Pro Series East ====
NASCAR K&N Pro Series East results
Year	Team	No.	Make	1	2	3	4	5	6	7	8	9	10	11	12	13	14	NKNPSEC	Pts	Ref
2008	Buchanan-Mitchell Racing	23	Chevy	GRE	IOW	SBO	GLN; 22	NHA	TMP	NSH	ADI	LRP	MFD	NHA	DOV	STA		70th	97	
2012	Spraker Racing	37	Chevy	BRI	GRE	RCH	IOW	BGS	JFC	LGY	CNB	COL	IOW	NHA	DOV	GRE	CAR; 17	64th	27	

^{*} Season still in progress
^{1} Ineligible for series points

=== ARCA Racing Series ===
(key) (Bold – Pole position awarded by qualifying time. Italics – Pole position earned by points standings or practice time. * – Most laps led.)

ARCA Racing Series results
Year	Team	No.	Make	1	2	3	4	5	6	7	8	9	10	11	12	13	14	15	16	17	18	19	20	21	ARSC	Pts	Ref
2008	TRG Motorsports	71	Chevy	DAY	SLM	IOW	KAN	CAR	KEN	TOL	POC	MCH	CAY	KEN	BLN	POC	NSH; 31	ISF	DSF	CHI	SLM	NJE	TAL; 20	TOL	91st	205	
2009	Eddie Sharp Racing	2	Toyota	DAY; 8	SLM; 24	CAR; 15	TAL; 13	KEN; 14	TOL; 17	POC; 19	MCH; 13	MFD; 22	IOW; 19	KEN; 23	BLN; 25	POC; 19	ISF; 14	CHI; 21	TOL; 16	DSF; 23	NJE; 5	SLM; 22	KAN; 15	CAR; 22	11th	4235	
2010	Richard Childress Racing	31	Chevy	DAY; 19	PBE; 8	SLM; 16	TEX; 13	TAL; 3	TOL; 25	POC; 10	MCH; 8	IOW; 12	MFD; 4	POC; 18	BLN; 16	NJM; 11	ISF; 15	CHI; 16	DSF; 13	TOL; 14	SLM; 12	KAN; 15	CAR; 34		9th	4215	
2011	Richard Childress Racing	31	Chevy	DAY; 27	TAL; 18	SLM; 11	TOL; 4	NJE; 4	CHI; 32	POC; 1	MCH; 3	WIN; 11	BLN; 2	IOW; 5	IRP; 28	POC; 2	ISF; 16	MAD; 9	DSF; 9	SLM; 3	KAN; 16	TOL; 17			7th	4325	

=== 24 Hours of Daytona ===
(key)

24 Hours of Daytona results
Year	Class	No	Team	Car	Co-drivers	Laps	Position	Class Pos.
2008	GT	71	(United States) The Racer's Group	Porsche GT3 Cup	(United States) Bryan Sellers (United States) Spencer Pumpelly (France) Emmanuel Collard (France) Romain Dumas	657	11	3
2009	GT	66	(United States) The Racer's Group	Porsche GT3 Cup	(United States) Ted Ballou (United States) Spencer Pumpelly (France) Emmanuel Collard (Australia) Richard Lietz	694	10	2
2010	GT	71	(United States) The Racer's Group	Porsche GT3 Cup	(United States) Spencer Pumpelly (Germany) Timo Bernhard (France) Romain Dumas (United States) Bobby Labonte	668	16	9
2011	GT	66	(United States) The Racer's Group	Porsche GT3 Cup	(Germany) Dominik Farnbacher (United States) Ben Keating (Germany) Lucas Luhr	612	27 ^{DNF}	13 ^{DNF}
