= Paulie Harraka =

American stock car racing driver (born 1989)

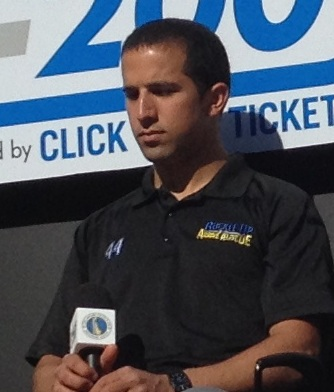
- Harraka at Dover International Speedway in May 2014
- Born: Paul Peter Harraka; September 15, 1989 (age 37); Wayne, New Jersey, U.S.
- Height: 5 ft 10 in (1.78 m)
- Weight: 165 lb (75 kg)
- Achievements: 2008 NASCAR Whelen All-American Series Champion
- Awards: 2009 NASCAR Camping World West Series Rookie of the Year

NASCAR Cup Series career
- 1 race run over 1 year
- 2013 position: 75th
- Best finish: 75th (2013)
- First race: 2013 Toyota/Save Mart 350 (Sonoma)
Wins	Top tens	Poles
0	0	0

NASCAR O'Reilly Auto Parts Series career
- 5 races run over 4 years
- 2014 position: 64th
- Best finish: 64th (2014)
- First race: 2010 NAPA Auto Parts 200 (Montreal)
- Last race: 2014 Buckle Up 200 (Dover)
Wins	Top tens	Poles
0	0	0

NASCAR FedEx Freight Truck Series career
- 11 races run over 1 year
- 2012 position: 28th
- Best finish: 28th (2012)
- First race: 2012 NextEra Energy Resources 250 (Daytona)
- Last race: 2012 Pocono Mountains 125 (Pocono)
Wins	Top tens	Poles
0	0	0
- Statistics up to date as of May 31, 2014.

Paul Peter Harraka (born September 15, 1989) is an American former professional stock car racing driver and entrepreneur. He is a graduate of Duke University and a former representative of NASCAR's Drive for Diversity program.

== Personal life ==
Harraka was born in Wayne, New Jersey to a family of Syrian descent. Harraka attended Wayne Valley High School from his freshman through junior years, but spent his senior year at Lake Norman High School to be closer to NASCAR team Joe Gibbs Racing, where he worked as an engineering and research and development intern. During this time, Harraka lived with Kenny Francis, crew chief for Kasey Kahne.

After graduating from high school with a 4.38 GPA, Harraka opted to attend Duke University, stating “I think that in the modern age of racing, knowing all aspects of the business is crucial to being successful." After beginning his studies in Mechanical Engineering, Harraka transferred to Duke's Trinity School of Arts and Sciences, where he studied Markets and Management, Sociology, and History. Harraka is one of only two NASCAR drivers with University degrees, the other being Ryan Newman.

== Racing career ==
=== Early career ===
Harraka first sat behind the wheel when he received a backyard fun kart from his family and started driving it around abandoned buildings. Harraka entered his first race on June 1, 1997, at Flemington Speedway, and despite being underage (Harraka was seven and New Jersey law required that drivers be at least eigh years old), Harraka won. In a karting career that spanned from 1997 to 2005, Harraka amassed a World Karting Association Triple Crown, the Holley Future Star Award, 13 National Championships, and six World Championships, and 158 total wins in go-karts. In 2005, he moved from kart to legends car racing, where he won multiple races.

Harraka also won a popular karting event at Mark Dismore's karting facility in Indiana, the RoboPong 200 (now known as the Dan Wheldon Cup after the 2005 winner was killed in October 2011) karting event, teamed with on-sabbatical NASCAR driver Ricky Rudd.

=== NASCAR ===
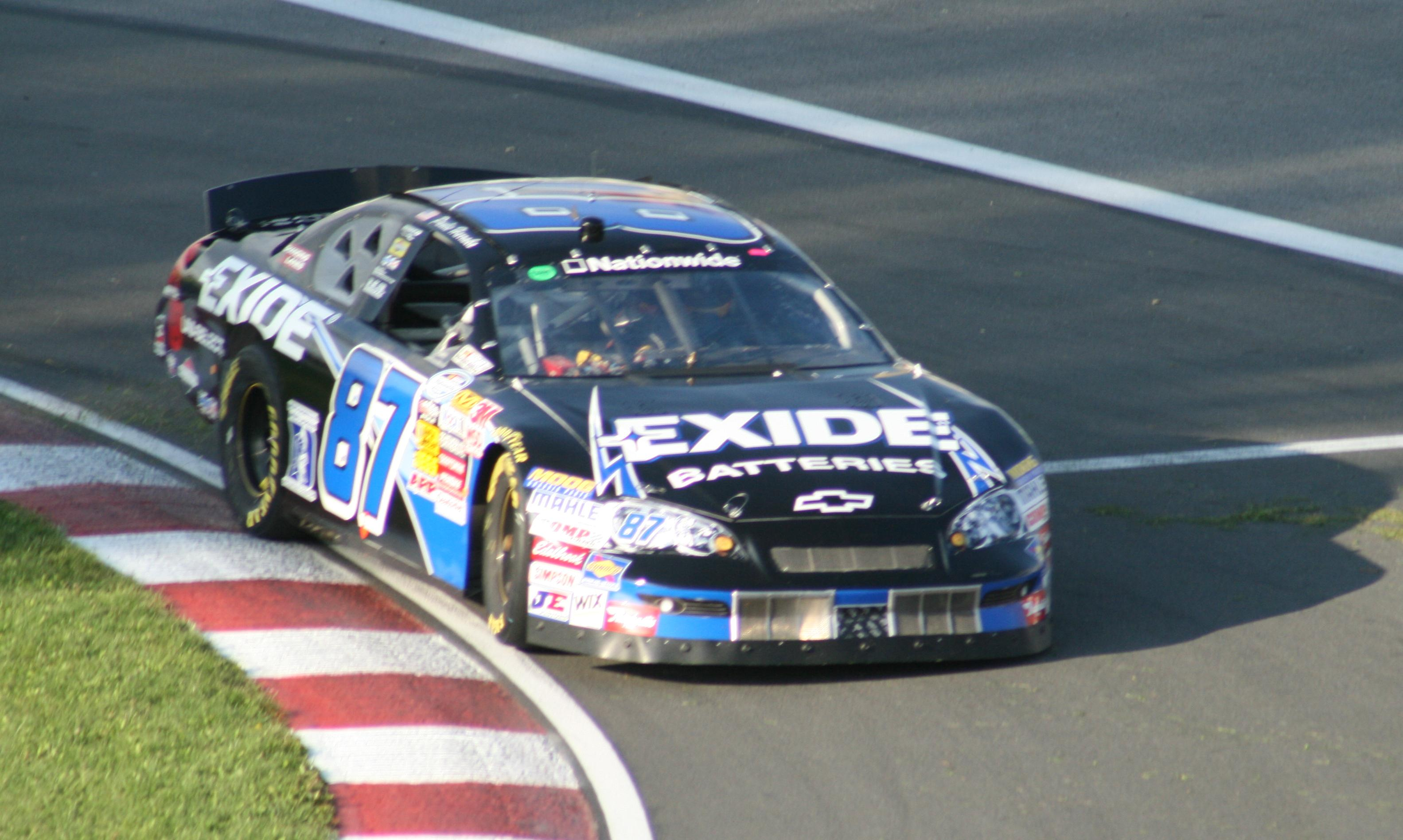
Harraka qualifying at Circuit Gilles Villeneuve in 2010

Harraka was invited to the Drive for Diversity Combine in the fall of 2006, where he impressed team owner Bill McAnally. McAnally hired Harraka to compete for his California-based team, despite Harraka still being in high school in New Jersey. Harraka traveled back and forth between New Jersey and California every weekend, and ultimately finished second in the All American Series in Roseville, California that year, winning the Rookie of the Year title. Harraka returned to the team in 2008, this time holding the duties of both driver and crew chief. The team would win eleven out of 23 races as well as the NASCAR Championship.

At the end of 2008, McAnally elected to move Harraka up to the NASCAR K&N Pro Series for the final two races of the season as preparation for a full run in 2009. In the last race of the season, second race for the team, he qualified on the pole and led 40 laps.

Over the next two seasons, Harraka competed full-time for McAnally, first under the NAPA Autocare banner, then with NAPA Filters sponsorship, with crew chief Duane Knorr. The team has won three races and has fifteen top-five finishes in thirty total races. They finished fourth and third in the series championship in 2009 and 2010, respectively, with Harraka winning Rookie of the Year in 2009 and Move of the Race in 2010.

Harraka took 2011 off from racing to further his studies, but did run the K&N Pro Series West race at Infineon Raceway. For 2012, Harraka competed in the Camping World Truck Series, running for Rookie of the Year driving for Wauters Motorsports. Midway through the season, Harraka left Wauters Motorsports.

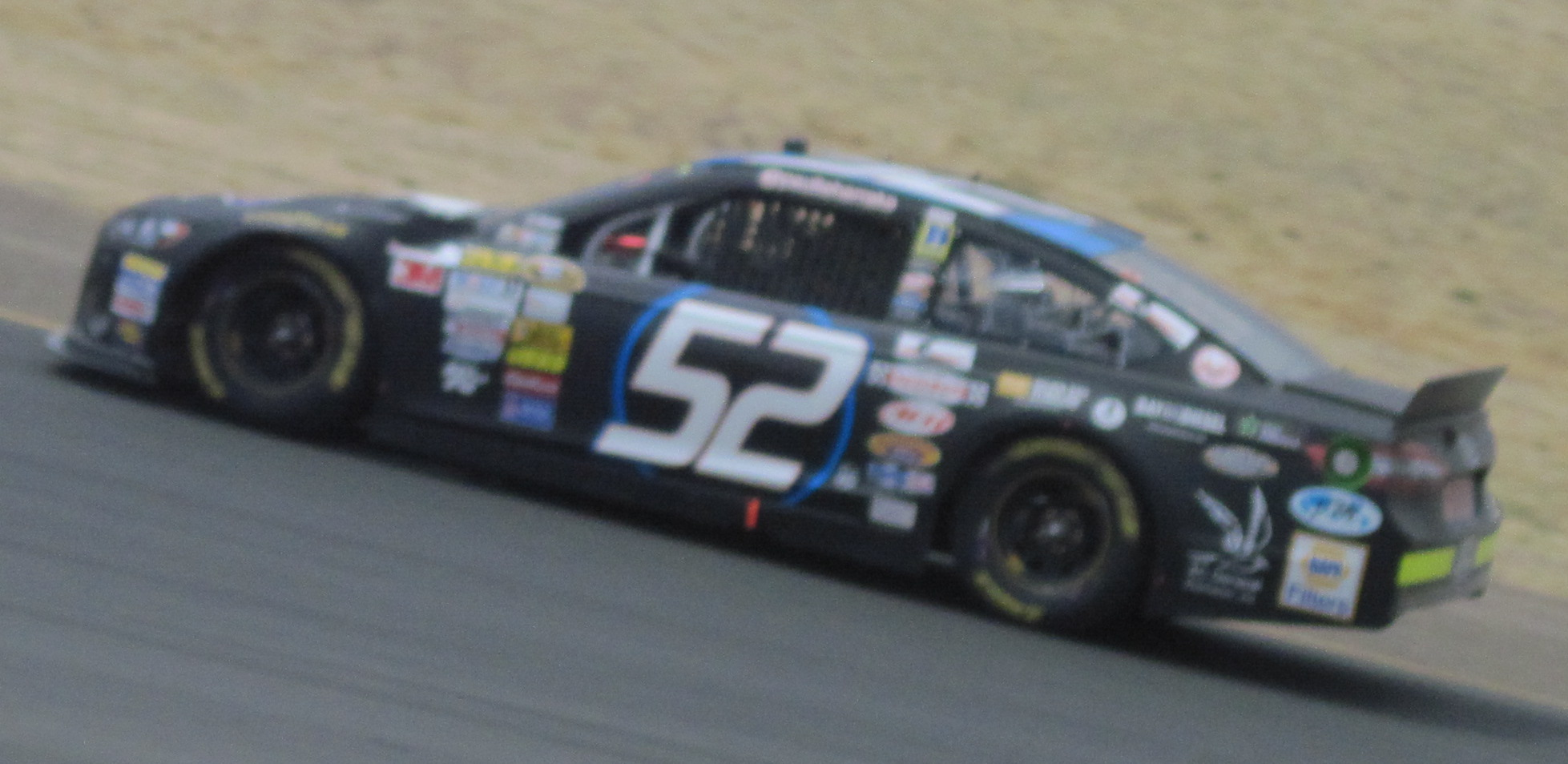
Harraka's No. 52 car at Sonoma Raceway in 2013

In September 2012, Harraka drove for Go Green Racing in the Nationwide Series at Richmond International Raceway. In 2013, Harraka made his NASCAR Sprint Cup Series debut at Sonoma Raceway, driving the No. 52 Ford for Go Green Racing. Before the race started, while exiting pit lane to begin the pre-race pace laps, Harraka slammed into the back of Alex Kennedy, who was also making his debut. Harraka would go on to complete 89 laps en route to a 39th-place finish.Harraka’s final NASCAR start came at Dover Motor Speedway driving for TriStar Motorsports in the NASCAR Xfinity Series. Harraka then retired from NASCAR to focus on business interests.

== Entrepreneurship ==
=== Paulie Harraka LLC ===
In 2011, Harraka partnered with a group of Fortune 500 CEOs, venture capitalists, and professional sports executives as a partner to launch innovative technology platforms that challenge conventional approaches to the sport and business of NASCAR. The investor group supported Harraka's NASCAR racing activities and entrepreneurial business ventures disruptive to NASCAR. In November 2013, Harraka delivered a talk chronicling his entrepreneurial ventures at TEDxBeaconStreet in Boston, making Harraka the only NASCAR driver ever to deliver a TED presentation.

=== Koloma, Inc ===
Harraka went on to cofounded Koloma, Inc with Dr. Thomas Darrah, a geochemist from Ohio State University, and Pete Johnson, a clean energy entrepreneur. Koloma is "a natural hydrogen company that leverages its technology, proprietary data, and human capital advantages to identify and commercialize these resources on a global scale." Geologic Hydrogen is considered by many to be at the cutting edge of the next frontier of energy. As Chief Business Officer, Harraka leads all financial, operational, and legal functions for the company, which has raised $400 million in investment capital.

== Motorsports career results ==
=== NASCAR ===
(key) (Bold – Pole position awarded by qualifying time. Italics – Pole position earned by points standings or practice time. * – Most laps led.)

==== Sprint Cup Series ====
NASCAR Sprint Cup Series results
Year	Team	No.	Make	1	2	3	4	5	6	7	8	9	10	11	12	13	14	15	16	17	18	19	20	21	22	23	24	25	26	27	28	29	30	31	32	33	34	35	36	NSCC	Pts	Ref
2013	Go Green Racing	52	Ford	DAY	PHO	LVS	BRI	CAL	MAR	TEX	KAN	RCH	TAL	DAR	CLT	DOV	POC	MCH	SON; 39	KEN	DAY	NHA	IND	POC	GLN	MCH	BRI	ATL	RCH	CHI	NHA	DOV	KAN	CLT	TAL	MAR	TEX	PHO	HOM	75th	0^{1}	

==== Nationwide Series ====
NASCAR Nationwide Series results
Year	Team	No.	Make	1	2	3	4	5	6	7	8	9	10	11	12	13	14	15	16	17	18	19	20	21	22	23	24	25	26	27	28	29	30	31	32	33	34	35	NNSC	Pts	Ref
2010	NEMCO Motorsports	87	Chevy	DAY	CAL	LVS	BRI	NSH	PHO	TEX	TAL	RCH	DAR	DOV	CLT	NSH	KEN	ROA	NHA	DAY	CHI	GTY	IRP	IOW	GLN	MCH	BRI	CGV; 29	ATL	RCH	DOV	KAN	CAL	CLT	GTY	TEX	PHO	HOM	124th	76	
2011	Randy Hill Racing	08	Ford	DAY	PHO	LVS	BRI	CAL	TEX	TAL	NSH	RCH	DAR	DOV	IOW	CLT	CHI	MCH	ROA	DAY	KEN	NHA	NSH	IRP	IOW	GLN	CGV	BRI	ATL	RCH; 25	CHI	DOV	KAN	CLT	TEX	PHO; 21	HOM		130th	0^{1}	
2013	Go Green Racing	79	Ford	DAY	PHO	LVS	BRI	CAL; 35	TEX	RCH	TAL	DAR	CHA	DOV	IOW	MCH	ROA	KEN	DAY	NHA	CHI	IND	IOW	GLN	MOH	BRI	ATL	RCH	CHI	KEN	DOV	KAN	CHA	TEX	PHO	HOM			85th	9	
2014	TriStar Motorsports	44	Toyota	DAY	PHO	LVS	BRI	CAL	TEX	DAR	RCH	TAL	IOW	CLT	DOV; 19	MCH	ROA	KEN	DAY	NHA	CHI	IND	IOW	GLN	MOH	BRI	ATL	RCH	CHI	KEN	DOV	KAN	CLT	TEX	PHO	HOM			64th	25	

==== Camping World Truck Series ====
NASCAR Camping World Truck Series results
Year	Team	No.	Make	1	2	3	4	5	6	7	8	9	10	11	12	13	14	15	16	17	18	19	20	21	22	NCWTC	Pts	Ref
2012	Wauters Motorsports	5	Ford	DAY; 19	MAR; 22	CAR; 26	KAN; 27	CLT; 30	DOV; 17	TEX; 28	KEN; 17	IOW; 33	CHI; 19	POC; 24	MCH	BRI	ATL	IOW	KEN	LVS	TAL	MAR	TEX	PHO	HOM	28th	223	

^{1} Ineligible for series points

==== K&N Pro Series West ====
NASCAR K&N Pro Series West results
Year	Team	No.	Make	1	2	3	4	5	6	7	8	9	10	11	12	13	14	15	NKNPSWC	Pts	Ref
2008	Paul Harraka	04	Chevy	AAS	PHO	CTS	IOW	CNS	SON	IRW	DCS	EVG	MMP; 26	IRW					29th	382	
2008	Bill McAnally Racing	12	Toyota												AMP; 8	**AAS**; 6			29th	382	
2009	Bill McAnally Racing	12	Toyota	CTS; 17	AAS; 3	PHO; 8	MAD; 4	IOW; 2	DCS; 13	SON; 14	IRW; 3	PIR; 16	MMP; 2	CNS; 1	IOW; 12	**AAS**; 1*			4th	1951	
2010	Bill McAnally Racing	12	Toyota	**AAS**; 1*	PHO; 29	IOW; 18	DCS; 5	SON; 2	IRW; 13	PIR; 3	MRP; 11	CNS; 2	MMP; 3	AAS; 4	PHO; 25				3rd	1707	
2011	Bill McAnally Racing	12	Toyota	PHO	AAS	MMP	IOW	LVS	SON; 12	IRW	EVG	PIR	CNS	MRP	SPO	AAS	PHO		77th	132	
2013	Bill McAnally Racing	20	Toyota	PHO	S99	BIR	IOW	L44	SON; 5	CNS	IOW	EVG	SPO	MMP	SMP	AAS	KCR	PHO	50th	39	

=== ARCA Racing Series ===
(key) (Bold – Pole position awarded by qualifying time. Italics – Pole position earned by points standings or practice time. * – Most laps led.)

ARCA Racing Series results
Year	Team	No.	Make	1	2	3	4	5	6	7	8	9	10	11	12	13	14	15	16	17	18	19	20	ARSC	Pts	Ref
2012	Venturini Motorsports	55	Toyota	DAY; 26	MOB	SLM	TAL	TOL	ELK	POC	MCH	WIN	NJE	IOW	CHI	IRP	POC	BLN	ISF	MAD	SLM	DSF	KAN	128th	100	
