= Russ Dugger =

American stock car racing driver

- Born: Russell Dugger; January 12, 1975 (age 51); Mountain Grove, Missouri, U.S.

NASCAR FedEx Freight Truck Series career
- 4 races run over 2 years
- 2012 position: 53rd
- Best finish: 53rd (2012)
- First race: 2008 Lucas Oil 150 (Phoenix)
- Last race: 2012 WinStar World Casino 350K (Texas)
| Wins | Top tens | Poles |
|---|---|---|
| 0 | 0 | 0 |
- Statistics up to date as of November 16, 2012.

Russell Dugger (born January 12, 1975) is an American professional stock car racing driver who has competed in both the NASCAR Truck Series and the ARCA Racing Series.

== Racing career ==
Dugger was a world-class R/C driver before he began competing in full size vehicles. He was sponsored by numerous nitro R/C manufacturers to compete in national and international events, specializing in both 1/8 scale on-road nitro pan car and 1/8 scale nitro off-road buggy classes.

Through an acquaintance with Mark Eldridge of Mobile Soundstage Engineering, Dugger has piloted a one-of-a-kind street legal 2006 Dodge Charger show car converted from a retired NASCAR chassis for private and charity ride-along events around Hallett Motor Racing Circuit.

Dugger has driven a wide variety of race vehicles, demonstrating an aptitude for car control and developing a reputation as a natural. He has competed or driven in dirt micro sprint cars, in TaG karts, on road courses in GT1 and GTO cars, in SCCA auto-x events, on short-track paved ovals in NASCAR-style trucks, and then in both the ARCA Racing Series and NASCAR Truck Series.

=== ARCA ===
Dugger participated in the December 2007 ARCA test session at Daytona where he gained valuable superspeedway seat time, but he did not make the start in the race there the following February.

In February 2010, Dugger made his first ever ARCA start in the Lucas Oil Slick Mist 200 at Daytona International Speedway - the same event at which Danica Patrick made her stock car racing debut. He drove the No. 12 Accell Construction Chevrolet Monte Carlo for DGM Racing's Mario Gosselin, whom he met through an acquaintance in 2007 at Daytona. Gosselin served as crew chief for Dugger's first race, and was impressed by his performance throughout the open test and race weekend. Despite being collected in a lap 7 wreck, Dugger claimed the race's fast lap with a time of 48.283 seconds at 186.401 mph.

In April 2010, Dugger made his second ARCA start in the Rattlesnake 150 at Texas Motor Speedway. He would again pilot the No. 12 Accell Construction Chevrolet, fielded by DGM Racing but with George Church as crew-chief. Due to rain during qualifying, he started in 31st position, but drove to a fourteenth-place result and finished on the lead lap.

Dugger's third ARCA start came in September 2010, in the Kansas Lottery 150 at Kansas Speedway. Racing with the DGM Racing team in the No. 12 Accell Construction Chevrolet, he was able to attend the open practice a week before the race event. The additional experience helped the team and driver become more familiar with the track, as evidenced by their performance in the race. With Gosselin as his crew-chief, Dugger qualified in the nineteenth position but drove to a twelfth-place result, again finishing on the lead lap. The race was noteworthy because Dugger ran in the top-ten for much of the race, as high as ninth before the last late caution flag.

In 2015, Dugger went back to Daytona with DGM Racing and failed to make the race. He went on to Talladega that same year and accomplished his career best finish of fifth, and then went to Kansas Speedway and after running as high as fourth late in the race, finished eleventh.

=== Truck Series ===
In 2008, Dugger made two appearances (Martinsville, Phoenix), and his debut in the NASCAR Camping World Truck Series came at Phoenix where he retired with brake issues.

In 2012, Dugger announced that he would compete in six NASCAR Camping World Truck Series events with primary and secondary sponsorship from JPO Absorbents and Vacuworx Global. Running in a limited schedule kept "Rookie of the Year" options open for 2013, according to an interview he gave with the Tulsa World newspaper. His published schedule included events at Kansas, Texas Motor Speedway, Bristol, Kentucky, Martinsville, and Homestead-Miami Speedway.

== Personal life ==
Dugger was a prodigal musician during his teenage years, with his interest in motorsports at that time one of many interests competing for time. Already an accomplished, classically trained trumpeter, he enrolled at the University of Arkansas in Fayetteville after high school where he majored in music with designs on performing and teaching music professionally. During the course of his studies, he was invited to perform and awarded a chair with the Fayetteville Symphony Orchestra.

Upon graduating college, Dugger felt a calling to serve his country and promptly decided to join the United States Air Force - a decision which ultimately led to an opportunity to play trumpet in the United States Air Force Band, which he did for five years before deciding to pursue motorsports. He currently lives in Owasso, Oklahoma.

Additionally, Dugger is involved with the Aaron Gillming Foundation, an Oklahoma-based group providing services to families who have lost loved ones to drunk drivers. He has also represented Tulsa-based charity The Little Light House in his starts in the Truck Series.

== Motorsports career results ==
=== NASCAR ===
(key) (Bold – Pole position awarded by qualifying time. Italics – Pole position earned by points standings or practice time. * – Most laps led.)

==== Camping World Truck Series ====
NASCAR Camping World Truck Series results
| Year | Team | No. | Make | 1 | 2 | 3 | 4 | 5 | 6 | 7 | 8 | 9 | 10 | 11 | 12 | 13 | 14 | 15 | 16 | 17 | 18 | 19 | 20 | 21 | 22 | 23 | 24 | 25 | NCWTC | Pts | Ref |
|---|---|---|---|---|---|---|---|---|---|---|---|---|---|---|---|---|---|---|---|---|---|---|---|---|---|---|---|---|---|---|---|
| 2008 | Lafferty Motorsports | 89 | Chevy | DAY | CAL | ATL | MAR | KAN | CLT | MFD | DOV | TEX | MCH | MLW | MEM | KEN | IRP | NSH | BRI | GTW | NHA | LVS | TAL | MAR; DNQ | ATL | TEX | PHO; 32 | HOM | 103rd | 67 | |
| 2012 | DGM Racing | 12 | Chevy | DAY | MAR | CAR | KAN; 33 | CLT | DOV | TEX | KEN | IOW | CHI | POC | MCH | | | | | | | | | | | | | | 53rd | 44 | |
| 2012 | Glenden Enterprises | 84 | Chevy | | | | | | | | | | | | | BRI; 26 | ATL | IOW | KEN | LVS | TAL | MAR | TEX; 29 | PHO | HOM | | | | 53rd | 44 | |

=== ARCA Racing Series ===
(key) (Bold – Pole position awarded by qualifying time. Italics – Pole position earned by points standings or practice time. * – Most laps led. Small number denotes finishing position.)

ARCA Racing Series results
| Year | Team | No. | Make | 1 | 2 | 3 | 4 | 5 | 6 | 7 | 8 | 9 | 10 | 11 | 12 | 13 | 14 | 15 | 16 | 17 | 18 | 19 | 20 | ARSC | Pts | Ref |
|---|---|---|---|---|---|---|---|---|---|---|---|---|---|---|---|---|---|---|---|---|---|---|---|---|---|---|
| 2010 | DGM Racing | 12 | Chevy | DAY; 38 | PBE | SLM | TEX; 14 | TAL | TOL | POC | MCH | IOW | MFD | POC | BLN | NJE | ISF | CHI | DSF | TOL | SLM | KAN; 12 | CAR | 62nd | 370 | |
| 2015 | DGM Racing | 80 | Chevy | DAY; DNQ | MOB | NSH | SLM | TAL; 5 | TOL | NJE | POC | MCH | CHI | WIN | IOW | IRP | POC | BLN | ISF | DSF | SLM | KEN | KAN; 11 | 56th | 405 | |
| 2016 | DGM Racing | 80 | Chevy | DAY; DNQ | NSH | SLM | TAL | TOL | NJE | POC | MCH | MAD | WIN | IOW | IRP | POC | BLN | ISF | DSF | SLM | CHI | KEN | KAN | N/A | 0 | |
