= Chris Fontaine =

American racing driver (born 1981)

- Born: Christopher Fontaine; December 1, 1981 (age 44); Lakeland, Florida, U.S.

NASCAR FedEx Freight Truck Series career
- 59 races run over 13 years
- 2019 position: 86th
- Best finish: 25th (2012)
- First race: 2005 UAW-GM Ohio 250 (Mansfield)
- Last race: 2019 NextEra Energy 250 (Daytona)
Wins	Top tens	Poles
0	3	0
- Statistics up to date as of November 18, 2019.

Christopher Fontaine (born December 1, 1981) is an American former professional stock car racing driver. He has competed in the NASCAR Gander RV & Outdoors Truck Series, driving in 59 races, most notably for Glenden Enterprises. He is known for his nickname “Uncle Chris”, which he goes by through his social media presence.

== Beginnings ==
Fontaine began racing at the age of 16, driving Minicup racecars. In his first years of driving, he racked up two wins, and finished in the top five in thirteen of his fourteen races. He also won many other Late Model races in the FASCAR and SARA Series.

In 2001, Fontaine ran the NASCAR All Pro Series. In 2002, Fontaine attempted to make his debut in the NASCAR Busch Series, using a car purchased from NEMCO Motorsports; he failed to qualify for races at Memphis Motorsports Park, Dover International Speedway, and Nashville Superspeedway.

Returning to FASCAR and All-American Challenge Series competition for the next two seasons, Fontaine posted a career best points finish of fifth after the 2004 AACS season.

== ASA and NASCAR ==
In 2005, Fontaine made his first ever start in NASCAR competition at the national series level. Driving in the Craftsman Truck Series for Bobby Hamilton Racing, he finished seventeenth at Mansfield Motorsports Park. He also drove in two more races that year, at the Milwaukee Mile, and the Kansas Speedway. At Kansas, Fontaine was involved in a spectacular wreck with Kelly Sutton, after making contact with Sutton's truck, flipping her over.

In 2007, Fontaine finished fifth in the American Speed Association Late Model Southern Division points. he also finished third in Rookie Points in 2007. Fontaine made two more starts in the NASCAR Craftsman Truck Series in 2007. He drove for Xpress Motorsports, getting his best finish of 17th at Mansfield Motorsports Park. For the 2009 season, Fontaine teamed up with Glenden Enterprises to race a handful of races in the NASCAR Camping World Truck Series in his own trucks. At Gateway International Raceway, he earned his career best finish of 13th.

For 2010, Fontaine ran seven races with Glenden, having an impressive run at Talladega, leading 15 laps before finishing 19th. In 2011, Fontaine returned to Daytona International Speedway in the Trucks and qualified 6th but was caught up in a large wreck near the end. For 2012, Fontaine returned to the Camping World Truck Series, running the majority of the season; he scored his first top-ten in the series in the season opener at Daytona International Speedway, finishing seventh.

In 2014, Fontaine scored his second career top-ten finish at Talladega Superspeedway, finishing seventh. For 2015, Fontaine continued to enter in select superspeedway races while making his debut at Eldora Speedway with B. J. McLeod Motorsports, finishing 16th. At Talladega, Fontaine scored his third career top-ten finish, finishing eighth. In 2016, Fontaine entered in four races with Glenden Enterprises in the number 78, failing to qualify at Martinsville Speedway and Eldora Speedway, while managing to qualify for both Daytona and Talladega.

Fontaine's last race with the truck chassis "Freak", a truck that Fontaine had bought in 2009 from HT Motorsports that had won at Daytona three times with Bobby Hamilton Racing, came in 2018 at Talladega Superspeedway, where he was running inside the top-five and crashed after making contact with Justin Haley.

== Personal life ==
Fontaine is a graduate of George W. Jenkins High School. He is married to his middle school girlfriend Lindsay (Moyer) Fontaine. They have been married since April 7, 2019. His younger cousin Justin used to compete full-time in the Truck Series.

In 2005, Fontaine was accused of rape following an evening out at a nightclub. Although he maintained innocence, he negotiated a plea deal in which adjuciation was withheld, and he was ordered to attend anger management classes, as well as undergoing psychological evaluation and sensitivity training.

== Motorsports career results ==
=== NASCAR ===
(key) (Bold – Pole position awarded by qualifying time. Italics – Pole position earned by points standings or practice time. * – Most laps led.)

==== Xfinity Series ====
NASCAR Xfinity Series results
Year	Team	No.	Make	1	2	3	4	5	6	7	8	9	10	11	12	13	14	15	16	17	18	19	20	21	22	23	24	25	26	27	28	29	30	31	32	33	34	NXSC	Pts	Ref
2002	E. E. Sawyer	41	Chevy	DAY	CAR	LVS	DAR	BRI	TEX	NSH	TAL	CAL	RCH	NHA	NZH	CLT	DOV	NSH	KEN	MLW	DAY	CHI	GTY	PPR	IRP	MCH	BRI	DAR	RCH; DNQ	DOV; DNQ	KAN	CLT	MEM; DNQ	ATL	CAR	PHO	HOM	NA	-	
2016	B. J. McLeod Motorsports	99	Ford	DAY; DNQ	ATL	LVS	PHO	CAL	TEX	BRI	RCH	TAL	DOV	CLT	POC	MCH	IOW	DAY	KEN	NHA	IND	IOW	GLN	MOH	BRI	ROA	DAR	RCH	CHI	KEN	DOV	CLT	KAN	TEX	PHO	HOM		127th	0^{1}	

==== Gander Outdoors Truck Series ====
NASCAR Gander Outdoors Truck Series results
Year	Team	No.	Make	1	2	3	4	5	6	7	8	9	10	11	12	13	14	15	16	17	18	19	20	21	22	23	24	25	NGOTC	Pts	Ref
2005	Bobby Hamilton Racing	4	Dodge	DAY	CAL	ATL	MAR	GTY	MFD; 17	CLT	DOV	TEX	MCH	MLW; 25	KAN; 29	KEN	MEM	IRP	NSH	BRI	RCH	NHA	LVS	MAR	ATL	TEX	PHO	HOM	60th	276	
2007	Xpress Motorsports	16	Ford	DAY	CAL	ATL	MAR	KAN	CLT	MFD; 17	DOV	TEX	MCH	MLW															71st	215	
2007	Xpress Motorsports	16	Chevy												MEM; 20	KEN	IRP	NSH	BRI	GTW	NHA	LVS	TAL	MAR	ATL	TEX	PHO	HOM	71st	215	
2009	Glenden Enterprises	84	Chevy	DAY	CAL	ATL	MAR; 20			DOV; 14	TEX	MCH; 15	MLW	MEM; 27	KEN	IRP; 21	NSH	BRI; 23	CHI	IOW	GTW; 13	NHA		MAR; 17	TAL	TEX	PHO	HOM	33rd	1045	
2009	GunBroker Racing	21	Dodge					KAN; 32																					33rd	1045	
2009	GunBroker Racing	22	Dodge						CLT; 36																				33rd	1045	
2009	Tagsby Racing	65	Chevy																				LVS; 33						33rd	1045	
2010	Glenden Enterprises	84	Chevy	DAY	ATL; 17	MAR	NSH; 28	KAN	DOV; 17	CLT		MCH; 17	IOW			POC; 21	NSH	DAR	BRI	CHI; 13	KEN	NHA							40th	714	
2010	Tagsby Racing	73	Chevy								TEX; 29			GTY; DNQ	IRP														40th	714	
2010	Tagsby Racing	65	Chevy																				LVS; DNQ	MAR					40th	714	
2010	Glenden Enterprises	84	Toyota																						TAL; 19	TEX	PHO	HOM	40th	714	
2011	Glenden Enterprises	84	Toyota	DAY; 19	PHO																				TAL; 25	MAR	TEX	HOM	35th	124	
2011	Glenden Enterprises	84	Chevy			DAR; DNQ	MAR	NSH		CLT; 18	KAN	TEX	KEN; 33	IOW	NSH	IRP	POC; 27	MCH	BRI	ATL; 27	CHI	NHA	KEN	LVS					35th	124	
2011	Vision Aviation Racing	51	Chevy						DOV; 18																				35th	124	
2012	Glenden Enterprises	84	Toyota	DAY; 7																	TAL; 29								25th	271	
2012	Glenden Enterprises	84	Chevy		MAR; DNQ	CAR; DNQ	KAN; 20	CLT; 32	DOV; 23	TEX	KEN; 20	IOW; 25	CHI; 27	POC; 18	MCH; 29	BRI	ATL; 26	IOW	KEN; 34	LVS; 29		MAR; 36		PHO; 34	HOM				25th	271	
2012	Glenden Enterprises	83	Chevy																				TEX; DNQ						25th	271	
2013	Glenden Enterprises	84	Toyota	DAY; 34	MAR	CAR	KAN	CLT	DOV	TEX	KEN	IOW	ELD	POC	MCH	BRI	MSP	IOW	CHI	LVS									49th	40	
2013	Glenden Enterprises	83	Toyota																		TAL; 15	MAR	TEX	PHO	HOM				49th	40	
2014	Glenden Enterprises	84	Toyota	DAY; 19	MAR	KAN	CLT	DOV	TEX	GTW	KEN	IOW	ELD	POC	MCH	BRI	MSP	CHI	NHA	LVS	TAL; 7	MAR	TEX	PHO	HOM				47th	61	
2015	Glenden Enterprises	84	Toyota	DAY; 25	ATL	MAR	KAN	CLT	DOV	TEX	GTW	IOW	KEN																47th	64	
2015	B. J. McLeod Motorsports	45	Chevy											ELD; 16	POC	MCH	BRI	MSP	CHI	NHA	LVS								47th	64	
2015	Glenden Enterprises	45	Toyota																			TAL; 8	MAR	TEX	PHO	HOM			47th	64	
2016	Glenden Enterprises	78	Toyota	DAY; 22	ATL	MAR; DNQ	KAN	DOV	CLT	TEX	IOW	GTW	KEN	ELD; DNQ	POC	BRI	MCH	MSP	CHI	NHA	LVS	TAL; 23	MAR	TEX	PHO	HOM			54th	21	
2017	Glenden Enterprises	47	Toyota	DAY; DNQ	ATL	MAR	KAN	CLT	DOV	TEX	GTW	IOW	KEN	ELD	POC	MCH	BRI	MSP	CHI	NHA	LVS	TAL; 26	MAR	TEX	PHO	HOM			71st	11	
2018	Glenden Enterprises	47	Chevy	DAY; 29	ATL	LVS	MAR	DOV	KAN	CLT	TEX	IOW	GTW	CHI	KEN	ELD	POC	MCH	BRI	MSP	LVS	TAL; 24	MAR	TEX	PHO	HOM			69th	21	
2019	Glenden Enterprises	47	Toyota	DAY; 27	ATL	LVS	MAR	TEX	DOV	KAN	CLT	TEX	IOW	GTW	CHI	KEN	POC	ELD	MCH	BRI	MSP	LVS	TAL	MAR	PHO	HOM			86th	10	

=== CARS Super Late Model Tour ===
(key)

CARS Super Late Model Tour results
Year	Team	No.	Make	1	2	3	4	5	6	7	8	9	10	CSLMTC	Pts	Ref
2015	Glenden Enterprises	47	Chevy	SNM; 19	ROU; 10	HCY; 28	SNM	TCM	MMS	ROU	CON	MYB	HCY	35th	42	
2018	Glenden Enterprises	47	Chevy	MYB; 13	NSH	ROU	HCY	BRI	AND	HCY	ROU	SBO		38th	21	

^{*} Season still in progress
^{1} Ineligible for series points
