= Wauters Motorsports =

Stock car racing team

- Owner: Richie Wauters
- Base: Mooresville, North Carolina
- Series: NASCAR Gander RV & Outdoors Truck Series; Late Models
- Manufacturer: Toyota
- Opened: 1999

Career
- Debut: Camping World Truck Series: 1999 NAPA 250 (Martinsville); ARCA/CRA Super Series: 2013 SpeedFest 200 (Watermelon Capital)
- Latest race: Camping World Truck Series: 2017 Active Pest Control 200 (Atlanta); ARCA/CRA Super Series: 2004 Snowball Derby (Five Flags)
- Races competed: Total: 136; Camping World Truck Series: 45; ARCA/CRA Super Series: 91
- Drivers' Championships: Total: 0 Camping World Truck Series: 0 ARCA/CRA Super Series: 0
- Race victories: Total: 2 Camping World Truck Series: 0 ARCA/CRA Super Series: 2
- Pole positions: Total: 0 Camping World Truck Series: 0 ARCA/CRA Super Series: 0

Wauters Motorsports is an American professional stock car racing team that most notably competed in the NASCAR Camping World Truck Series, fielding the No. 5 Toyota Tundra part-time. The team still competes in late models. The team is primarily owned by Wauters, with former NASCAR team owners Billy Ballew and James Finch also part of the organization as co-owners since 2020.

== History ==
=== Truck No. 5 history ===
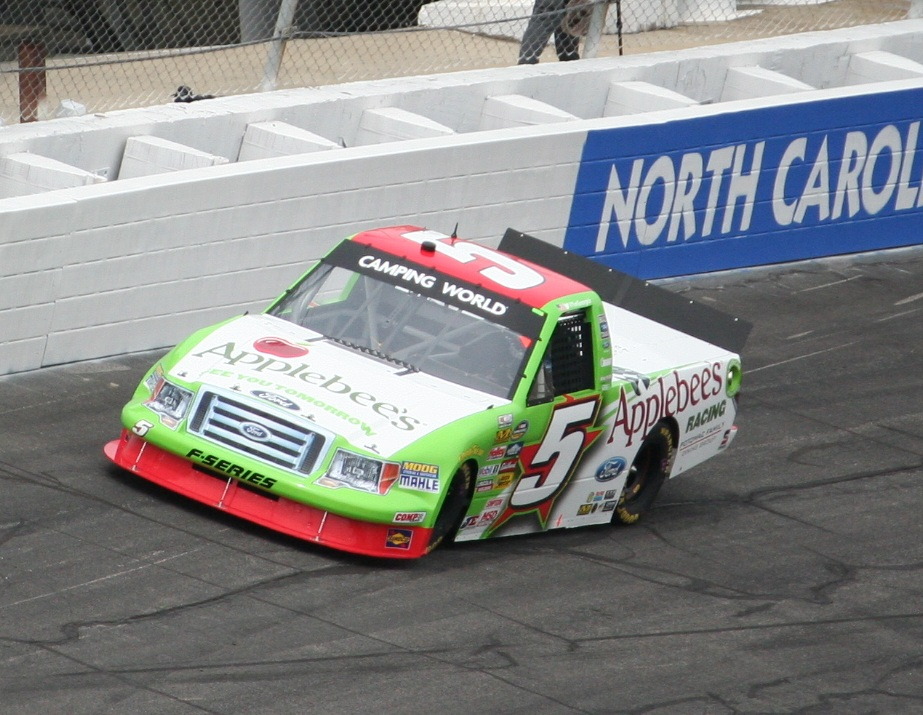
Team's 2013 truck at Rockingham

In January 2012, veteran NASCAR crew chief Richie Wauters reformed the team after buying the remnants of the Randy Moss Motorsports team and its owner points.

Wauters Motorsports debuted in 2011 as the number 51 Ford, in a joint venture with Richie Wauters' longtime team Billy Ballew Motorsports. The truck utilized the paint scheme Ballew ran early in their history, and Wauters served as crew chief. Colin Braun drove the truck in two races with sponsorship from Bullet Liners, scoring a ninth-place finish in the team's debut.

The No. 5 truck began racing in 2012 with former Drive for Diversity member Paulie Harraka, who intended to contend for Rookie of the Year in the No. 5 Ford. Midway through the season the team chose to skip races at Michigan International Speedway and Bristol Motor Speedway to regroup; but before the race at Atlanta Motor Speedway Harraka was released from the team. Harraka had an average finish of 23.8 in 11 races, with a best finish of 17th at Dover and Kentucky. After the split with Harraka, Aric Almirola drove the truck at Atlanta, Talladega and Texas II, John King at Kentucky II and Phoenix, Josh Richards at Martinsville II, and Ryan Reed at Las Vegas. Only Almirola would earn a top-5 and top 10 (twice) finish in the year, the best results for the team during the year.

In 2013, former Richard Childress Racing development driver Tim George Jr. announced his addition to the team for the season, bringing sponsorship from Applebee's. In May after four races, the team switched manufacturers from Ford to Chevrolet, with engines coming from ECR Engines. Jason Bowles drove a single race at Eldora with Valvoline sponsorship, and after 11 races the team shut down.

In 2014, the team signed John Wes Townley, who brought longtime sponsor Zaxby's from Red Horse Racing. The team also switched to Toyota, with engines from Joe Gibbs Racing. Prior to the Iowa race, Townley moved to Athenian Motorsports owned by his father. Wauter's team shut down for the remainder of the season.

For 2015, the team planned to return to competition with driver Germán Quiroga at Kansas in May, with funding coming from a Kickstarter campaign. The campaign, however, failed to raise the desired amount of money. K&N Pro Series East driver Dalton Sargeant, who also runs late models for Wauters, made his Truck Series debut with the team in 2015 at Bristol in August. Sargeant did well in his races, including a 9th-place finish at Bristol.

After being absent for most of 2016, the team returned for the round of Talladega in October with Korbin Forrister driving.

On February 22, 2017, Wauters announced a deal with Forrister to drive the full 2017 season. After crashing in the first two races of the season, Forrister and Wauters split and Wauters focused on his Super Late Model program with Mason Mingus, Trevor Noles, and Spencer Wauters for the remainder of 2017. The arrangement with Mingus continued into 2018 with only him driving it in select events.

The team returned to the Truck Series in 2020 with Erik Jones at Charlotte. They did not qualify.

==== Truck No. 5 results ====
| Year | Driver | No. | Make | 1 | 2 | 3 | 4 | 5 | 6 | 7 | 8 | 9 | 10 | 11 | 12 | 13 | 14 | 15 | 16 | 17 | 18 | 19 | 20 | 21 | 22 | 23 | Owners | Pts |
|---|---|---|---|---|---|---|---|---|---|---|---|---|---|---|---|---|---|---|---|---|---|---|---|---|---|---|---|---|
| 2012 | Paulie Harraka | 5 | Ford | DAY; 19 | MAR; 22 | CAR; 26 | KAN; 27 | CLT; 30 | DOV; 17 | TEX; 28 | KEN; 17 | IOW; 33 | CHI; 19 | POC; 24 | MCH | BRI | | | | | | | | | | | 23rd | 425 |
| 2012 | Aric Almirola | 5 | Ford | | | | | | | | | | | | | | ATL; 5 | IOW | | | TAL; 26 | | TEX; 9 | | HOM; Wth | | 23rd | 425 |
| 2012 | John King | 5 | Ford | | | | | | | | | | | | | | | | KEN; 25 | | | | | PHO; 29 | | | 23rd | 425 |
| 2012 | Ryan Reed | 5 | Ford | | | | | | | | | | | | | | | | | LVS; 17 | | | | | | | 23rd | 425 |
| 2012 | Josh Richards | 5 | Ford | | | | | | | | | | | | | | | | | | | MAR; 17 | | | | | 23rd | 425 |
| 2013 | Tim George Jr. | 5 | Ford | DAY; 16 | MAR; 22 | CAR; 18 | KAN; 14 | | | | | | | | | | | | | | | | | | | | 31st | 272 |
| 2013 | Tim George Jr. | 5 | Chevy | | | | | CLT; 16 | DOV; 25 | TEX; 21 | KEN; 18 | IOW; 23 | | POC; 16 | MCH; Wth | BRI; Wth | MSP | IOW | CHI | LVS | TAL | MAR | TEX | PHO | HOM | | 31st | 272 |
| 2013 | Jason Bowles | 5 | Chevy | | | | | | | | | | ELD; 24 | | | | | | | | | | | | | | 31st | 272 |
| 2014 | John Wes Townley | 5 | Toyota | DAY; 14 | MAR; 20 | KAN; 11 | CLT; 4 | DOV; 12 | TEX; 5 | GTW; 8 | KEN; 21 | IOW | ELD | POC | MCH | BRI | MSP | CHI | NHA | LVS | TAL | MAR | TEX | PHO | HOM | | 29th | 257 |
| 2015 | Dalton Sargeant | 5 | Toyota | DAY | ATL | MAR | KAN | CLT | DOV | TEX | GTW | IOW | KEN | ELD | POC | MCH | BRI; 10 | MSP | CHI | NHA; 9 | LVS | TAL | MAR; 28 | TEX | PHO; 19 | HOM | 35th | 110 |
| 2016 | Korbin Forrister | 5 | Toyota | DAY | ATL | MAR | KAN | DOV | CLT | TEX | IOW | GTW | KEN | ELD | POC | BRI | MCH | MSP | CHI | NHA | LVS | TAL; 27 | MAR | TEX | PHO | HOM | 47th | 6 |
| 2017 | Korbin Forrister | 5 | Toyota | DAY; 20 | ATL; 22 | MAR; Wth | KAN | CLT | DOV | TEX | GTW | IOW | KEN | ELD | POC | MCH | BRI | MSP | CHI | NHA | LVS | TAL | MAR | TEX | PHO | HOM | 42nd | 36 |
| 2020 | Erik Jones | 5 | Toyota | DAY | LVS | CLT; DNQ | ATL | HOM | POC | KEN | TEX | KAN | KAN | MCH | DRC | DOV | GTW | DAR | RCH | BRI | LVS | TAL | KAN | TEX | MAR | PHO | N/A | - |

=== Truck No. 18 history ===
Noah Gragson was scheduled to drive the No. 18 truck from Kyle Busch Motorsports, but since KBM wanted to focus their assets on William Byron and Christopher Bell in their 2016 championship bids, Wauters fielded the No. 18 truck for Gragson in the final two races of the season finishing 16th and 15th respectively.

==== Truck No. 18 results ====
| Year | Driver | No. | Make | 1 | 2 | 3 | 4 | 5 | 6 | 7 | 8 | 9 | 10 | 11 | 12 | 13 | 14 | 15 | 16 | 17 | 18 | 19 | 20 | 21 | 22 | 23 | Owners | Pts |
|---|---|---|---|---|---|---|---|---|---|---|---|---|---|---|---|---|---|---|---|---|---|---|---|---|---|---|---|---|
| 2016 | Noah Gragson | 18 | Toyota | DAY | ATL | MAR | KAN | DOV | CLT | TEX | IOW | GTW | KEN | ELD | POC | BRI | MCH | MSP | CHI | NHA | LVS | TAL | MAR | TEX | PHO; 16 | HOM; 15 | 40th | 35 |

== Recent wins ==
1. Snowball Derby won by Steven Wallace in Circa. December 2004
2. All American 400 won by Mason Mingus on November 3, 2019

== See also ==
- Athenian Motorsports
- Billy Ballew Motorsports
- Kyle Busch Motorsports
