= 2015 Rhino Linings 350 =

18th race of the 2015 NASCAR Camping World Truck Series

Race details
- Race 18 of 23 of the 2015 NASCAR Camping World Truck Series
- Date: October 3, 2015
- Official name: 19th Annual Rhino Linings 350
- Location: Las Vegas Motor Speedway, North Las Vegas, Nevada
- Course: Permanent racing facility
- Course length: 1.5 miles (2.4 km)
- Distance: 146 laps, 219 mi (352 km)
- Scheduled distance: 146 laps, 219 mi (352 km)
- Average speed: 132.772 mph (213.676 km/h)

Pole position
Driver	Matt Crafton	ThorSport Racing
- Time: 30.613

Most laps led
Driver	Matt Crafton	ThorSport Racing
- Laps: 69

Winner
No. 05	John Wes Townley	Athenian Motorsports

Television in the United States
- Network: FS1
- Announcers: Ralph Sheheen, Phil Parsons, and Michael Waltrip

Radio in the United States
- Radio: MRN

The 2015 Rhino Linings 350 was the 18th stock car race of the 2015 NASCAR Camping World Truck Series, and the 19th iteration of the event. The race was held on Saturday, October 3, 2015, in North Las Vegas, Nevada at Las Vegas Motor Speedway, a 1.5 mi (2.4 km) permanent tri-oval shaped racetrack. The race took the scheduled 146 laps to complete. John Wes Townley, driving for family-owned Athenian Motorsports, would take the upset win after taking the lead with five laps to go, and survived on fuel mileage to earn his first career NASCAR Camping World Truck Series win, and his only career win in NASCAR. Pole-sitter Matt Crafton dominated the majority of the race, leading a race-high 69 laps. To fill out the podium, Red Horse Racing teammates Timothy Peters and Ben Kennedy, would finish 2nd and 3rd, respectively.

== Background ==
The layout of Las Vegas Motor Speedway, the circuit where the race was held.

Las Vegas Motor Speedway, located in Clark County, Nevada in Las Vegas about 15 mi (24 km) northeast of the Las Vegas Strip, is a 1,200-acre (490 ha) complex of multiple tracks for motorsports racing. The complex is owned by Speedway Motorsports, Inc., which is headquartered in Charlotte, North Carolina.

=== Entry list ===
- (R) denotes rookie driver.
- (i) denotes driver who is ineligible for series driver points.

#	Driver	Team	Make	Sponsor
0	Caleb Roark	Jennifer Jo Cobb Racing	Chevrolet	Driven2Honor.org
1	Travis Kvapil	MAKE Motorsports	Chevrolet	Landworks
02	Tyler Young	Young's Motorsports	Chevrolet	Randco, Young's Building Systems
4	Erik Jones (R)	Kyle Busch Motorsports	Toyota	Toyota
05	John Wes Townley	Athenian Motorsports	Chevrolet	Zaxby's
6	Norm Benning	Norm Benning Racing	Chevrolet	Norm Benning Racing
07	Ray Black Jr. (R)	SS-Green Light Racing	Chevrolet	ScubaLife
08	Korbin Forrister (R)	BJMM with SS-Green Light Racing	Chevrolet	Tilted Kilt
8	John Hunter Nemechek (R)	SWM-NEMCO Motorsports	Chevrolet	SWM-NEMCO Motorsports
10	Jennifer Jo Cobb	Jennifer Jo Cobb Racing	Chevrolet	Waldo's Painting Company
11	Ben Kennedy	Red Horse Racing	Toyota	Local Motors
13	Cameron Hayley (R)	ThorSport Racing	Toyota	Carolina Nut Co.
14	Daniel Hemric (R)	NTS Motorsports	Chevrolet	California Clean Power
15	Mason Mingus	Billy Boat Motorsports	Chevrolet	Call 811 Before You Dig
16	Chad Boat	Billy Boat Motorsports	Chevrolet	CorvetteParts.net
17	Timothy Peters	Red Horse Racing	Toyota	Red Horse Racing
19	Tyler Reddick	Brad Keselowski Racing	Ford	DrawTite
21	Brennan Poole (i)	GMS Racing	Chevrolet	DC Solar
23	Spencer Gallagher (R)	GMS Racing	Chevrolet	Allegiant Travel Company
29	Austin Theriault (R)	Brad Keselowski Racing	Ford	Cooper-Standard Automotive
31	Travis Pastrana	NTS Motorsports	Chevrolet	GunBroker.com, Lazy F Ranch
33	Brandon Jones (R)	GMS Racing	Chevrolet	RSD
36	Justin Jennings	MB Motorsports	Chevrolet	Mittler Bros., Ski Soda
45	B. J. McLeod	B. J. McLeod Motorsports	Chevrolet	Tilted Kilt
50	Tyler Tanner	MAKE Motorsports	Chevrolet	Landworks
51	Matt Tifft	Kyle Busch Motorsports	Toyota	NASCAR Slots Games
54	Christopher Bell	Kyle Busch Motorsports	Toyota	JBL
63	Akinori Ogata	MB Motorsports	Chevrolet	Akinori Ogata Foundation
74	Jordan Anderson	Mike Harmon Racing	Chevrolet	Rusty's Off Road, PlateSetters.com
88	Matt Crafton	ThorSport Racing	Toyota	FVP, Menards
94	Wayne Edwards	Premium Motorsports	Chevrolet	Testoril, Champion Machinery
98	Johnny Sauter	ThorSport Racing	Toyota	Nextant Aerospace, Curb Records
Official entry list

== Practice ==
The first and only practice session was held on Saturday, October 3, at 9:00 AM PST, and would last for 2 hours and 30 minutes. Matt Crafton, driving for ThorSport Racing, would set the fastest time in the session, with a lap of 30.385, and an average speed of 177.719 mph (286.011 km/h).

Pos.	#	Driver	Team	Make	Time	Speed
1	88	Matt Crafton	ThorSport Racing	Toyota	30.385	177.719
2	98	Johnny Sauter	ThorSport Racing	Toyota	30.413	177.556
3	17	Timothy Peters	Red Horse Racing	Toyota	30.445	177.369
Full practice results

== Qualifying ==
Qualifying was held on Saturday, October 3, at 4:05 PM PST. The qualifying system used is a multi car, multi lap, two round system where in the first round, everyone would set a time to determine positions 13–32. Then, the fastest 12 qualifiers would move on to the second round to determine positions 1–12.

Matt Crafton, driving for ThorSport Racing, would win the pole after advancing from the preliminary rounds and setting the fastest time in Round 3, with a lap of 28.574, and an average speed of 133.296 mph (214.519 km/h).

No drivers would fail to qualify.

=== Full qualifying results ===
Pos.	#	Driver	Team	Make	Time (R1)	Speed (R1)	Time (R2)	Speed (R2)
1	88	Matt Crafton	ThorSport Racing	Toyota	30.671	176.062	30.613	176.396
2	05	John Wes Townley	Athenian Motorsports	Chevrolet	30.781	175.433	30.724	175.758
3	33	Brandon Jones (R)	GMS Racing	Chevrolet	30.688	175.965	30.738	175.678
4	17	Timothy Peters	Red Horse Racing	Toyota	30.782	175.427	30.771	175.490
5	54	Christopher Bell	Kyle Busch Motorsports	Toyota	30.859	174.989	30.803	175.308
6	13	Cameron Hayley (R)	ThorSport Racing	Toyota	30.832	175.143	30.816	175.234
7	29	Austin Theriault (R)	Brad Keselowski Racing	Ford	30.740	175.667	30.829	175.160
8	15	Mason Mingus	Billy Boat Motorsports	Chevrolet	30.887	174.831	30.855	175.012
9	11	Ben Kennedy	Red Horse Racing	Toyota	30.853	175.023	30.864	174.961
10	23	Spencer Gallagher (R)	GMS Racing	Chevrolet	30.782	175.427	30.891	174.808
11	19	Tyler Reddick	Brad Keselowski Racing	Ford	30.889	174.820	30.905	174.729
12	14	Daniel Hemric (R)	NTS Motorsports	Chevrolet	30.815	175.239	30.905	174.729
Eliminated from Round 1
13	98	Johnny Sauter	ThorSport Racing	Toyota	30.912	174.689	–	–
14	21	Brennan Poole (i)	GMS Racing	Chevrolet	30.938	174.543	–	–
15	4	Erik Jones (R)	Kyle Busch Motorsports	Toyota	30.940	174.531	–	–
16	8	John Hunter Nemechek (R)	SWM-NEMCO Motorsports	Chevrolet	30.956	174.441	–	–
17	31	Travis Pastrana	NTS Motorsports	Chevrolet	30.979	174.312	–	–
18	51	Matt Tifft	Kyle Busch Motorsports	Toyota	31.003	174.177	–	–
19	16	Chad Boat	Billy Boat Motorsports	Chevrolet	31.004	174.171	–	–
20	02	Tyler Young	Young's Motorsports	Chevrolet	31.055	173.885	–	–
21	1	Travis Kvapil	MAKE Motorsports	Chevrolet	31.323	172.397	–	–
22	07	Ray Black Jr. (R)	SS-Green Light Racing	Chevrolet	31.448	171.712	–	–
23	36	Justin Jennings	MB Motorsports	Chevrolet	31.636	170.692	–	–
24	10	Jennifer Jo Cobb	Jennifer Jo Cobb Racing	Chevrolet	31.637	170.686	–	–
25	45	B. J. McLeod	B. J. McLeod Motorsports	Chevrolet	32.025	168.618	–	–
26	08	Korbin Forrister (R)	BJMM with SS-Green Light Racing	Chevrolet	32.037	168.555	–	–
27	74	Jordan Anderson	Mike Harmon Racing	Chevrolet	32.074	168.361	–	–
Qualified by owner's points
28	0	Caleb Roark	Jennifer Jo Cobb Racing	Chevrolet	32.535	165.975	–	–
29	94	Wayne Edwards	Premium Motorsports	Chevrolet	32.964	163.815	–	–
30	63	Akinori Ogata	MB Motorsports	Chevrolet	33.079	163.246	–	–
31	50	Tyler Tanner	MAKE Motorsports	Chevrolet	33.362	161.861	–	–
32	6	Norm Benning	Norm Benning Racing	Chevrolet	33.659	160.433	–	–
Official qualifying results
Official starting lineup

== Race results ==
Fin	St	#	Driver	Team	Make	Laps	Led	Status	Pts	Winnings
1	2	05	John Wes Townley	Athenian Motorsports	Chevrolet	146	23	Running	47	$45,845
2	4	17	Timothy Peters	Red Horse Racing	Toyota	146	13	Running	43	$31,057
3	9	11	Ben Kennedy	Red Horse Racing	Toyota	146	0	Running	41	$25,167
4	16	8	John Hunter Nemechek (R)	SWM-NEMCO Motorsports	Chevrolet	146	0	Running	40	$21,906
5	3	33	Brandon Jones (R)	GMS Racing	Chevrolet	146	0	Running	39	$19,051
6	12	14	Daniel Hemric (R)	NTS Motorsports	Chevrolet	146	0	Running	38	$17,267
7	11	19	Tyler Reddick	Brad Keselowski Racing	Ford	146	2	Running	38	$16,712
8	1	88	Matt Crafton	ThorSport Racing	Toyota	146	69	Running	38	$19,762
9	15	4	Erik Jones (R)	Kyle Busch Motorsports	Toyota	146	0	Running	35	$16,406
10	6	13	Cameron Hayley (R)	ThorSport Racing	Toyota	145	23	Running	35	$17,301
11	14	21	Brennan Poole (i)	GMS Racing	Chevrolet	145	0	Running	0	$14,045
12	13	98	Johnny Sauter	ThorSport Racing	Toyota	145	13	Running	33	$16,156
13	22	07	Ray Black Jr. (R)	SS-Green Light Racing	Chevrolet	145	1	Running	32	$16,099
14	5	54	Christopher Bell	Kyle Busch Motorsports	Toyota	145	0	Running	30	$16,044
15	10	23	Spencer Gallagher (R)	GMS Racing	Chevrolet	144	0	Running	29	$16,306
16	17	31	Travis Pastrana	NTS Motorsports	Chevrolet	144	0	Running	28	$15,966
17	20	02	Tyler Young	Young's Motorsports	Chevrolet	144	0	Running	27	$15,656
18	21	1	Travis Kvapil	MAKE Motorsports	Chevrolet	144	1	Running	27	$15,516
19	18	51	Matt Tifft	Kyle Busch Motorsports	Toyota	143	0	Running	25	$15,406
20	8	15	Mason Mingus	Billy Boat Motorsports	Chevrolet	142	0	Running	24	$14,600
21	24	10	Jennifer Jo Cobb	Jennifer Jo Cobb Racing	Chevrolet	140	0	Running	23	$13,933
22	27	74	Jordan Anderson	Mike Harmon Racing	Chevrolet	138	0	Running	22	$12,822
23	30	63	Akinori Ogata	MB Motorsports	Chevrolet	135	0	Running	21	$12,712
24	29	94	Wayne Edwards	Premium Motorsports	Chevrolet	135	0	Running	20	$12,600
25	19	16	Chad Boat	Billy Boat Motorsports	Chevrolet	114	0	Handling	19	$12,695
26	32	6	Norm Benning	Norm Benning Racing	Chevrolet	46	0	Suspension	18	$12,517
27	26	08	Korbin Forrister (R)	BJMM with SS-Green Light Racing	Chevrolet	34	0	Oil Leak	17	$12,462
28	25	45	B. J. McLeod	B. J. McLeod Motorsports	Chevrolet	33	0	Overheating	16	$12,213
29	23	36	Justin Jennings	MB Motorsports	Chevrolet	29	1	Electrical	16	$12,185
30	28	0	Caleb Roark	Jennifer Jo Cobb Racing	Chevrolet	16	0	Electrical	14	$11,685
31	7	29	Austin Theriault (R)	Brad Keselowski Racing	Ford	14	0	Accident	13	$10,185
32	31	50	Tyler Tanner	MAKE Motorsports	Chevrolet	5	0	Ignition	12	$9,185
Official race results

== Standings after the race ==
Drivers' Championship standings

	Pos	Driver	Points
	1	Erik Jones	701
	2	Matt Crafton	697 (-4)
	3	Tyler Reddick	685 (–16)
	4	Johnny Sauter	650 (–51)
	5	Daniel Hemric	596 (–105)
	6	Timothy Peters	595 (–106)
	7	Cameron Hayley	584 (–117)
	8	John Wes Townley	565 (–136)
1	9	Ben Kennedy	545 (–156)
1	10	Spencer Gallagher	533 (–168)
Official driver's standings

- Note: Only the first 10 positions are included for the driver standings.

Previous race: 2015 UNOH 175	NASCAR Camping World Truck Series; 2015 season	Next race: 2015 Fred's 250
