= 2015 UNOH 200 =

14th race of the 2015 NASCAR Camping World Truck Series

2015 UNOH 200 presented by ZLOOP
Race details
- Race 14 of 23 of the 2015 NASCAR Camping World Truck Series
- Date: August 19, 2015
- Official name: 18th Annual UNOH 200 presented by ZLOOP
- Location: Bristol Motor Speedway, Bristol, Tennessee
- Course: Permanent racing facility
- Course length: 0.533 miles (0.858 km)
- Distance: 202 laps, 107 mi (173 km)
- Scheduled distance: 200 laps, 106 mi (171 km)
- Average speed: 80.481 mph (129.522 km/h)

Pole position
Driver	Kyle Busch	Kyle Busch Motorsports
- Time: 15.267

Most laps led
Driver	Cole Custer	JR Motorsports
- Laps: 111

Winner
No. 29	Ryan Blaney	Brad Keselowski Racing

Television in the United States
- Network: FS1
- Announcers: Ralph Sheheen, Phil Parsons, and Michael Waltrip

Radio in the United States
- Radio: MRN

The 2015 UNOH 200 presented by ZLOOP was the 14th stock car race of the 2015 NASCAR Camping World Truck Series, and the 18th iteration of the event. The race was held on Wednesday, August 19, 2015, in Bristol, Tennessee at Bristol Motor Speedway, a 0.533 mile (0.858 km) permanent oval-shaped racetrack. The race was increased from 200 to 202 laps, due to a NASCAR overtime finish. Ryan Blaney, driving for Brad Keselowski Racing, would hold off pole-sitter Kyle Busch on the final restart to earn his fourth career NASCAR Camping World Truck Series win, and his first of the season. To fill out the podium, Busch, driving for his team, Kyle Busch Motorsports, and John Hunter Nemechek, driving for SWM-NEMCO Motorsports, would finish 2nd and 3rd, respectively.

== Background ==
The layout of Bristol Motor Speedway, the circuit where the race was held.

Bristol Motor Speedway, formerly known as Bristol International Raceway and Bristol Raceway, is a NASCAR short track venue located in Bristol, Tennessee. Constructed in 1960, it held its first NASCAR race on July 30, 1961. Bristol is among the most popular tracks on the NASCAR schedule because of its distinct features, which include extraordinarily steep banking, an all-concrete surface, two pit roads, Different turn radii, and stadium-like seating. It has also been named one of the loudest NASCAR tracks.

=== Entry list ===
- (R) denotes rookie driver.
- (i) denotes driver who is ineligible for series driver points.

#	Driver	Team	Make	Sponsor
00	Cole Custer	JR Motorsports	Chevrolet	Haas Automation
0	Caleb Roark	Jennifer Jo Cobb Racing	Chevrolet	Driven2Honor.org
1	Ryan Ellis	MAKE Motorsports	Chevrolet	Hutch Chevrolet
02	Tyler Young	Young's Motorsports	Chevrolet	Electro-General Plastics Corp.
4	Erik Jones (R)	Kyle Busch Motorsports	Toyota	Toyota
05	John Wes Townley	Athenian Motorsports	Chevrolet	Zaxby's
5	Dalton Sargeant	Wauters Motorsports	Toyota	Galt
6	Norm Benning	Norm Benning Racing	Chevrolet	Norm Benning Racing
07	Ray Black Jr. (R)	SS-Green Light Racing	Chevrolet	ScubaLife
08	Korbin Forrister (R)	BJMM with SS-Green Light Racing	Chevrolet	Trump for President
8	John Hunter Nemechek (R)	SWM-NEMCO Motorsports	Chevrolet	Meetball
10	Jennifer Jo Cobb	Jennifer Jo Cobb Racing	Chevrolet	Driven2Honor.org
11	Ben Kennedy	Red Horse Racing	Toyota	Local Motors
13	Cameron Hayley (R)	ThorSport Racing	Toyota	Carolina Nut Co., Curb Records
14	Daniel Hemric (R)	NTS Motorsports	Chevrolet	California Clean Power
15	Mason Mingus	Billy Boat Motorsports	Chevrolet	Call 811 Before You Dig
17	Timothy Peters	Red Horse Racing	Toyota	Red Horse Racing
19	Tyler Reddick	Brad Keselowski Racing	Ford	DrawTite
23	Spencer Gallagher (R)	GMS Racing	Chevrolet	Allegiant Travel Company
27	Cody Lane	Cody Lane Racing	Chevrolet	The Upholstery Shop, All Line Trailers
29	Ryan Blaney (i)	Brad Keselowski Racing	Ford	Cooper-Standard Automotive
31	Ty Dillon (i)	NTS Motorsports	Chevrolet	GunBroker.com
32	Justin Haley	Braun Motorsports	Chevrolet	Great Clips
33	Brandon Jones (R)	GMS Racing	Chevrolet	Masterforce Tool Storage
36	Tyler Tanner	MB Motorsports	Chevrolet	Mittler Bros., Ski Soda
45	B. J. McLeod	B. J. McLeod Motorsports	Chevrolet	Tilted Kilt
50	Travis Kvapil	MAKE Motorsports	Chevrolet	Burnie Grill
51	Daniel Suárez (i)	Kyle Busch Motorsports	Toyota	Arris
54	Kyle Busch (i)	Kyle Busch Motorsports	Toyota	Jegs High Performance
63	Justin Jennings	MB Motorsports	Chevrolet	Mittler Bros., Ski Soda
74	Jordan Anderson	Mike Harmon Racing	Chevrolet	Tri-Analytics, SRGFX.com
75	Caleb Holman	Henderson Motorsports	Chevrolet	Fuel in a Bottle, Food Country USA
88	Matt Crafton	ThorSport Racing	Toyota	Great Lakes Flooring, Menards
92	David Gilliland (i)	RBR Enterprises	Ford	Black's Tire Service
94	Wendell Chavous	Premium Motorsports	Chevrolet	Testoril
98	Johnny Sauter	ThorSport Racing	Toyota	Smokey Mountain Herbal Snuff
Official entry list

== Practice ==
=== First practice ===
The first practice session was held on Tuesday, August 18, at 2:00 PM EST, and would last for 2 hours and 55 minutes. Brandon Jones, driving for GMS Racing, would set the fastest time in the session, with a lap of 15.381, and an average speed of 124.751 mph (200.767 km/h).

Pos.	#	Driver	Team	Make	Time	Speed
1	33	Brandon Jones (R)	GMS Racing	Chevrolet	15.381	124.751
2	88	Matt Crafton	ThorSport Racing	Toyota	15.385	124.719
3	4	Erik Jones (R)	Kyle Busch Motorsports	Toyota	15.404	124.565
Full first practice results

=== Final practice ===
The final practice session was held on Wednesday, August 19, at 11:00 AM EST, and would last for 1 hour and 25 minutes. Cole Custer, driving for JR Motorsports, would set the fastest time in the session, with a lap of 15.165, and an average speed of 126.528 mph (203.627 km/h).

Pos.	#	Driver	Team	Make	Time	Speed
1	00	Cole Custer	JR Motorsports	Chevrolet	15.165	126.528
2	29	Ryan Blaney (i)	Brad Keselowski Racing	Ford	15.216	126.104
3	8	John Hunter Nemechek (R)	SWM-NEMCO Motorsports	Chevrolet	15.264	125.708
Full final practice results

== Qualifying ==
Qualifying was held on Wednesday, August 19, at 4:45 PM EST. The qualifying system used is a multi car, multi lap, three round system where in the first round, everyone would set a time to determine positions 25–32. Then, the fastest 24 qualifiers would move on to the second round to determine positions 13–24. Lastly, the fastest 12 qualifiers would move on to the third round to determine positions 1-12.

Kyle Busch, driving for his team, Kyle Busch Motorsports, would win the pole after advancing from the preliminary rounds and setting the fastest time in Round 3, with a lap of 15.267, and an average speed of 125.683 mph (202.267 km/h).

Jordan Anderson, Caleb Roark, B. J. McLeod, and Cody Lane would fail to qualify.

=== Full qualifying results ===
Pos.	#	Driver	Team	Make	Time (R1)	Speed (R1)	Time (R2)	Speed (R2)	Time (R3)	Speed (R3)
1	54	Kyle Busch (i)	Kyle Busch Motorsports	Toyota	15.308	125.346	15.285	125.535	15.267	125.683
2	29	Ryan Blaney (i)	Brad Keselowski Racing	Ford	15.271	125.650	15.267	125.683	15.282	125.559
3	33	Brandon Jones (R)	GMS Racing	Chevrolet	15.198	126.253	15.297	125.436	15.293	125.469
4	4	Erik Jones (R)	Kyle Busch Motorsports	Toyota	15.197	126.262	15.330	125.166	15.330	125.166
5	00	Cole Custer	JR Motorsports	Chevrolet	15.229	125.996	15.277	125.601	15.333	125.142
6	88	Matt Crafton	ThorSport Racing	Toyota	15.315	125.289	15.322	125.232	15.352	124.987
7	8	John Hunter Nemechek (R)	SWM-NEMCO Motorsports	Chevrolet	15.279	125.584	15.366	124.873	15.421	124.428
8	75	Caleb Holman	Henderson Motorsports	Chevrolet	15.339	125.093	15.434	124.323	15.435	124.315
9	13	Cameron Hayley (R)	ThorSport Racing	Toyota	15.382	124.743	15.322	125.232	15.450	124.194
10	92	David Gilliland (i)	RBR Enterprises	Ford	15.371	124.832	15.435	124.315	15.466	124.066
11	11	Ben Kennedy	Red Horse Racing	Toyota	15.338	125.101	15.410	124.517	15.480	123.953
12	98	Johnny Sauter	ThorSport Racing	Toyota	15.421	124.428	15.360	124.922	15.490	123.873
Eliminated from Round 2
13	23	Spencer Gallagher (R)	GMS Racing	Chevrolet	15.432	124.339	15.436	124.307	–	–
14	05	John Wes Townley	Athenian Motorsports	Chevrolet	15.586	123.110	15.441	124.267	–	–
15	17	Timothy Peters	Red Horse Racing	Toyota	15.319	125.256	15.444	124.242	–	–
16	51	Daniel Suárez (i)	Joe Gibbs Racing	Toyota	15.402	124.581	15.446	124.226	–	–
17	14	Daniel Hemric (R)	NTS Motorsports	Chevrolet	15.324	125.215	15.453	124.170	–	–
18	5	Dalton Sargeant	Wauters Motorsports	Toyota	15.273	125.633	15.456	124.146	–	–
19	19	Tyler Reddick	Brad Keselowski Racing	Ford	15.437	124.299	15.479	123.961	–	–
20	07	Ray Black Jr. (R)	SS-Green Light Racing	Chevrolet	15.721	122.053	15.603	122.976	–	–
21	32	Justin Haley	Braun Motorsports	Chevrolet	15.685	122.333	15.606	122.953	–	–
22	63	Justin Jennings	MB Motorsports	Chevrolet	15.795	121.481	15.613	122.898	–	–
23	31	Ty Dillon (i)	NTS Motorsports	Chevrolet	15.429	124.363	15.643	122.662	–	–
24	02	Tyler Young	Young's Motorsports	Chevrolet	15.624	122.811	15.744	121.875	–	–
Eliminated from Round 1
25	15	Mason Mingus	Billy Boat Motorsports	Chevrolet	15.824	121.259	–	–	–	–
26	50	Travis Kvapil	MAKE Motorsports	Chevrolet	15.854	121.029	–	–	–	–
27	36	Tyler Tanner	MB Motorsports	Chevrolet	15.873	120.885	–	–	–	–
Qualified by owner's points
28	1	Ryan Ellis	MAKE Motorsports	Chevrolet	16.161	118.730	–	–	–	–
29	10	Jennifer Jo Cobb	Jennifer Jo Cobb Racing	Chevrolet	16.370	117.214	–	–	–	–
30	08	Korbin Forrister (R)	BJMM with SS-Green Light Racing	Chevrolet	16.503	116.270	–	–	–	–
31	6	Norm Benning	Norm Benning Racing	Chevrolet	16.606	115.549	–	–	–	–
32	94	Wendell Chavous	Premium Motorsports	Chevrolet	16.660	115.174	–	–	–	–
Failed to qualify
33	74	Jordan Anderson	Mike Harmon Racing	Chevrolet	15.952	120.286	–	–	–	–
34	0	Caleb Roark	Jennifer Jo Cobb Racing	Chevrolet	15.986	120.030	–	–	–	–
35	45	B. J. McLeod	B. J. McLeod Motorsports	Chevrolet	15.988	120.015	–	–	–	–
36	27	Cody Lane	Cody Lane Racing	Chevrolet	–	–	–	–	–	–
Official qualifying results
Official starting lineup

== Race results ==
Fin	St	#	Driver	Team	Make	Laps	Led	Status	Pts	Winnings
1	2	29	Ryan Blaney (i)	Brad Keselowski Racing	Ford	202	40	Running	0	$46,349
2	1	54	Kyle Busch (i)	Kyle Busch Motorsports	Toyota	202	4	Running	0	$31,811
3	7	8	John Hunter Nemechek (R)	SWM-NEMCO Motorsports	Chevrolet	202	0	Running	41	$25,409
4	17	14	Daniel Hemric (R)	NTS Motorsports	Chevrolet	202	0	Running	40	$19,358
5	3	33	Brandon Jones (R)	GMS Racing	Chevrolet	202	1	Running	40	$17,800
6	4	4	Erik Jones (R)	Kyle Busch Motorsports	Toyota	202	0	Running	38	$16,114
7	6	88	Matt Crafton	ThorSport Racing	Toyota	202	39	Running	38	$16,948
8	19	19	Tyler Reddick	Brad Keselowski Racing	Ford	202	0	Running	36	$15,892
9	12	98	Johnny Sauter	ThorSport Racing	Toyota	202	7	Running	36	$15,837
10	18	5	Dalton Sargeant	Wauters Motorsports	Toyota	202	0	Running	34	$14,482
11	14	05	John Wes Townley	Athenian Motorsports	Chevrolet	202	0	Running	33	$15,726
12	15	17	Timothy Peters	Red Horse Racing	Toyota	202	0	Running	32	$15,560
13	10	92	David Gilliland (i)	RBR Enterprises	Ford	202	0	Running	0	$13,253
14	21	32	Justin Haley	Braun Motorsports	Chevrolet	202	0	Running	30	$13,198
15	11	11	Ben Kennedy	Red Horse Racing	Toyota	202	0	Running	29	$15,965
16	5	00	Cole Custer	JR Motorsports	Chevrolet	202	111	Running	30	$15,282
17	24	02	Tyler Young	Young's Motorsports	Chevrolet	201	0	Running	27	$15,221
18	9	13	Cameron Hayley (R)	ThorSport Racing	Toyota	201	0	Running	26	$15,143
19	26	50	Travis Kvapil	MAKE Motorsports	Chevrolet	199	0	Running	25	$15,088
20	22	63	Justin Jennings	MB Motorsports	Chevrolet	199	0	Running	24	$15,532
21	20	07	Ray Black Jr. (R)	SS-Green Light Racing	Chevrolet	198	0	Running	23	$14,977
22	13	23	Spencer Gallagher (R)	GMS Racing	Chevrolet	195	0	Running	22	$14,949
23	23	31	Ty Dillon (i)	NTS Motorsports	Chevrolet	194	0	Accident	0	$12,672
24	31	6	Norm Benning	Norm Benning Racing	Chevrolet	190	0	Running	20	$14,894
25	29	10	Jennifer Jo Cobb	Jennifer Jo Cobb Racing	Chevrolet	189	0	Running	19	$13,739
26	32	94	Wendell Chavous	Premium Motorsports	Chevrolet	188	0	Running	18	$13,533
27	30	08	Korbin Forrister (R)	BJMM with SS-Green Light Racing	Chevrolet	176	0	Running	17	$12,505
28	28	1	Ryan Ellis	MAKE Motorsports	Chevrolet	176	0	Running	16	$12,258
29	25	15	Mason Mingus	Billy Boat Motorsports	Chevrolet	158	0	Brakes	15	$12,202
30	16	51	Daniel Suárez (i)	Kyle Busch Motorsports	Toyota	154	0	Overheating	0	$11,202
31	8	75	Caleb Holman	Henderson Motorsports	Chevrolet	112	0	Accident	13	$10,702
32	27	36	Tyler Tanner	MB Motorsports	Chevrolet	12	0	Brakes	12	$9,202
Official race results

== Standings after the race ==
Drivers' Championship standings

	Pos	Driver	Points
	1	Tyler Reddick	550
	2	Matt Crafton	544 (-6)
	3	Erik Jones	543 (–7)
	4	Johnny Sauter	497 (–53)
1	5	Daniel Hemric	460 (–90)
1	6	Cameron Hayley	451 (–99)
	7	Timothy Peters	448 (–102)
	8	John Wes Townley	447 (–103)
	9	Spencer Gallagher	416 (–134)
	10	Ben Kennedy	410 (–140)
Official driver's standings

- Note: Only the first 10 positions are included for the driver standings.

Previous race: 2015 Careers for Veterans 200	NASCAR Camping World Truck Series; 2015 season	Next race: 2015 Chevrolet Silverado 250
