= 2015 WinStar World Casino & Resort 350 =

21st race of the 2015 NASCAR Camping World Truck Series

Race details
- Race 21 of 23 of the 2015 NASCAR Camping World Truck Series
- Date: November 6, 2015
- Official name: 17th Annual WinStar World Casino & Resort 350
- Location: Texas Motor Speedway, Fort Worth, Texas
- Course: Permanent racing facility
- Course length: 1.5 miles (2.4 km)
- Distance: 147 laps, 220 mi (354 km)
- Scheduled distance: 147 laps, 220 mi (354 km)
- Average speed: 158.002 mph (254.280 km/h)

Pole position
Driver	Matt Crafton	ThorSport Racing
- Time: 29.769

Most laps led
Driver	Erik Jones	Kyle Busch Motorsports
- Laps: 117

Winner
No. 4	Erik Jones	Kyle Busch Motorsports

Television in the United States
- Network: FS1
- Announcers: Ralph Sheheen, Phil Parsons, and Michael Waltrip

Radio in the United States
- Radio: MRN

The 2015 WinStar World Casino & Resort 350 was the 21st stock car race of the 2015 NASCAR Camping World Truck Series, and the 17th iteration of the event. The race was held on Friday, November 6, 2015, in Fort Worth, Texas at Texas Motor Speedway, a 1.5 mi (2.4 km) permanent tri-oval shaped racetrack. The race took the scheduled 147 laps to complete. Erik Jones, driving for Kyle Busch Motorsports, would put on a dominating performance, leading a race-high 117 laps and earning his 7th career NASCAR Camping World Truck Series win, and his third of the season. To fill out the podium, Daniel Suárez, driving for Kyle Busch Motorsports, and Ryan Blaney, driving for Brad Keselowski Racing, would finish 2nd and 3rd, respectively.

== Background ==
The layout of Texas Motor Speedway, the circuit where the race was held.

Texas Motor Speedway is a speedway located in the northernmost portion of Fort Worth, Texas in Denton County. The reconfigured track measures 1.500 mi (2.414 km) with banked 20° in turns 1 and 2 and banked 24° in turns 3 and 4. Texas Motor Speedway is a quad-oval design, where the front straightaway juts outward slightly. The track layout is similar to Atlanta Motor Speedway and Charlotte Motor Speedway. The track is owned by Speedway Motorsports, Inc. Nicknamed “The Great American Speedway“ the racetrack facility is one of the largest motorsports venues in the world capable of hosting crowds in excess of 200,000 spectators.

=== Entry list ===
- (R) denotes rookie driver.
- (i) denotes driver who is ineligible for series driver points.

#	Driver	Team	Make	Sponsor
00	Jeb Burton (i)	JR Motorsports	Chevrolet	Haas Automation
0	Caleb Roark	Jennifer Jo Cobb Racing	Chevrolet	Driven2Honor.org
1	Travis Kvapil	MAKE Motorsports	Chevrolet	MAKE Motorsports
02	Tyler Young	Young's Motorsports	Chevrolet	Randco, Young's Building Systems
4	Erik Jones (R)	Kyle Busch Motorsports	Toyota	Toyota
05	John Wes Townley	Athenian Motorsports	Chevrolet	Zaxby's
6	Norm Benning	Norm Benning Racing	Chevrolet	Norm Benning Racing
07	Ray Black Jr. (R)	SS-Green Light Racing	Chevrolet	ScubaLife
08	Korbin Forrister (R)	BJMM with SS-Green Light Racing	Chevrolet	Tilted Kilt
8	John Hunter Nemechek (R)	SWM-NEMCO Motorsports	Chevrolet	SWM-NEMCO Motorsports
10	Jennifer Jo Cobb	Jennifer Jo Cobb Racing	Chevrolet	Grimes Irrigation & Construction
11	Ben Kennedy	Red Horse Racing	Toyota	Local Motors
13	Cameron Hayley (R)	ThorSport Racing	Toyota	Carolina Nut Co.
14	Daniel Hemric (R)	NTS Motorsports	Chevrolet	California Clean Power
15	Mason Mingus	Billy Boat Motorsports	Chevrolet	Texas 811 Call Before You Dig
17	Timothy Peters	Red Horse Racing	Toyota	Red Horse Racing
19	Tyler Reddick	Brad Keselowski Racing	Ford	Stoney Creek Records
23	Spencer Gallagher (R)	GMS Racing	Chevrolet	Allegiant Travel Company
29	Ryan Blaney (i)	Brad Keselowski Racing	Ford	Cooper-Standard Automotive
33	Brandon Jones (R)	GMS Racing	Chevrolet	Russell Refrigeration Products
36	Tyler Tanner	MB Motorsports	Chevrolet	Mittler Bros., Ski Soda
45	Todd Peck	Peck Motorsports	Chevrolet	Tilted Kilt
49	Mike Harmon (i)	Mike Harmon Racing	Chevrolet	Mike Harmon Racing
50	Dexter Stacey	MAKE Motorsports	Chevrolet	MAKE Motorsports
51	Daniel Suárez (i)	Kyle Busch Motorsports	Toyota	Arris
54	Christopher Bell	Kyle Busch Motorsports	Toyota	JBL
63	Justin Jennings	MB Motorsports	Chevrolet	Mittler Bros., Ski Soda
74	Jordan Anderson	Mike Harmon Racing	Chevrolet	Columbia SC, Knight Fire Protection
88	Matt Crafton	ThorSport Racing	Toyota	Damp Rid, Menards
94	Timmy Hill	Premium Motorsports	Chevrolet	Testoril, Champion Machinery
97	Jesse Little	JJL Motorsports	Toyota	Protect the Harvest
98	Johnny Sauter	ThorSport Racing	Toyota	Smokey Mountain Herbal Snuff
Official entry list

== Practice ==
=== First practice ===
The first practice session was held on Thursday, November 5, at 2:00 PM CST, and would last for 1 hour 25 minutes. Matt Crafton, driving for ThorSport Racing, would set the fastest time in the session, with a lap of 30.023, and an average speed of 179.862 mph (289.460 km/h).

Pos.	#	Driver	Team	Make	Time	Speed
1	88	Matt Crafton	ThorSport Racing	Toyota	30.023	179.862
2	51	Daniel Suárez (i)	Kyle Busch Motorsports	Toyota	30.115	179.313
3	23	Spencer Gallagher (R)	GMS Racing	Chevrolet	30.128	179.235
Full first practice results

=== Final practice ===
The final practice session was held on Thursday, November 5, at 4:30 PM CST, and would last for 55 minutes. Cameron Hayley, driving for ThorSport Racing, would set the fastest time in the session, with a lap of 30.140, and an average speed of 179.164 mph (288.337 km/h).

Pos.	#	Driver	Team	Make	Time	Speed
1	13	Cameron Hayley (R)	ThorSport Racing	Toyota	30.140	179.164
2	00	Jeb Burton (i)	JR Motorsports	Chevrolet	30.264	178.430
3	11	Ben Kennedy	Red Horse Racing	Toyota	30.297	178.235
Full final practice results

== Qualifying ==
Qualifying was held on Friday, November 6, at 3:40 PM CST. The qualifying system used is a multi car, multi lap, two round system where in the first round, everyone would set a time to determine positions 13–32. Then, the fastest 12 qualifiers would move on to the second round to determine positions 1–12.

Matt Crafton, driving for ThorSport Racing, would win the pole after advancing from the preliminary round and setting the fastest time in Round 2, with a lap of 29.769, and an average speed of 181.397 mph (291.930 km/h).

No drivers would fail to qualify.

=== Full qualifying results ===
Pos.	#	Driver	Team	Make	Time (R1)	Speed (R1)	Time (R2)	Speed (R2)
1	88	Matt Crafton	ThorSport Racing	Toyota	29.825	181.056	29.769	181.397
2	23	Spencer Gallagher (R)	GMS Racing	Chevrolet	29.874	180.759	29.842	180.953
3	14	Daniel Hemric (R)	NTS Motorsports	Chevrolet	29.891	180.656	29.932	180.409
4	33	Brandon Jones (R)	GMS Racing	Chevrolet	29.897	180.620	29.935	180.391
5	4	Erik Jones (R)	Kyle Busch Motorsports	Toyota	30.019	179.886	29.995	180.030
6	17	Timothy Peters	Red Horse Racing	Toyota	30.006	179.964	30.009	179.946
7	51	Daniel Suárez (i)	Kyle Busch Motorsports	Toyota	30.045	179.730	30.014	179.916
8	00	Jeb Burton (i)	JR Motorsports	Chevrolet	29.880	180.723	30.020	179.880
9	11	Ben Kennedy	Red Horse Racing	Toyota	30.131	179.217	30.077	179.539
10	05	John Wes Townley	Athenian Motorsports	Chevrolet	30.130	179.223	30.089	179.468
11	54	Christopher Bell	Kyle Busch Motorsports	Toyota	30.111	179.336	30.095	179.432
12	8	John Hunter Nemechek (R)	SWM-NEMCO Motorsports	Chevrolet	30.126	179.247	30.149	179.110
Eliminated from Round 1
13	98	Johnny Sauter	ThorSport Racing	Ford	30.209	178.755	–	–
14	13	Cameron Hayley (R)	ThorSport Racing	Toyota	30.226	178.654	–	–
15	29	Ryan Blaney (i)	Brad Keselowski Racing	Ford	30.296	178.241	–	–
16	97	Jesse Little	JJL Motorsports	Toyota	30.296	178.241	–	–
17	19	Tyler Reddick	Brad Keselowski Racing	Ford	30.504	177.026	–	–
18	15	Mason Mingus	Billy Boat Motorsports	Chevrolet	30.585	176.557	–	–
19	07	Ray Black Jr. (R)	SS-Green Light Racing	Chevrolet	30.619	176.361	–	–
20	94	Timmy Hill	Premium Motorsports	Chevrolet	30.858	174.995	–	–
21	74	Jordan Anderson	Mike Harmon Racing	Chevrolet	31.288	172.590	–	–
22	1	Travis Kvapil	MAKE Motorsports	Chevrolet	31.404	171.953	–	–
23	63	Justin Jennings	MB Motorsports	Chevrolet	31.596	170.908	–	–
24	10	Jennifer Jo Cobb	Jennifer Jo Cobb Racing	Chevrolet	31.833	169.635	–	–
25	50	Dexter Stacey	MAKE Motorsports	Chevrolet	32.274	167.317	–	–
26	08	Korbin Forrister (R)	BJMM with SS-Green Light Racing	Chevrolet	32.451	166.405	–	–
27	45	Todd Peck	Peck Motorsports	Chevrolet	32.923	164.019	–	–
Qualified by owner's points
28	6	Norm Benning	Norm Benning Racing	Chevrolet	34.848	154.959	–	–
29	02	Tyler Young	Young's Motorsports	Chevrolet	–	–	–	–
30	36	Tyler Tanner	MB Motorsports	Chevrolet	–	–	–	–
31	0	Caleb Roark	Jennifer Jo Cobb Racing	Chevrolet	–	–	–	–
Qualified by time
32	49	Mike Harmon (i)	Mike Harmon Racing	Chevrolet	33.307	162.128	–	–
Official qualifying results
Official starting lineup

== Race results ==
Fin	St	#	Driver	Team	Make	Laps	Led	Status	Pts	Winnings
1	5	4	Erik Jones (R)	Kyle Busch Motorsports	Toyota	147	117	Running	48	$62,424
2	7	51	Daniel Suárez (i)	Kyle Busch Motorsports	Toyota	147	0	Running	0	$42,737
3	15	29	Ryan Blaney (i)	Brad Keselowski Racing	Ford	147	0	Running	0	$34,886
4	1	88	Matt Crafton	ThorSport Racing	Toyota	147	27	Running	41	$27,750
5	17	19	Tyler Reddick	Brad Keselowski Racing	Ford	147	1	Running	40	$19,678
6	6	17	Timothy Peters	Red Horse Racing	Toyota	147	0	Running	38	$18,020
7	4	33	Brandon Jones (R)	GMS Racing	Chevrolet	147	0	Running	37	$17,495
8	11	54	Christopher Bell	Kyle Busch Motorsports	Toyota	147	0	Running	36	$16,965
9	9	11	Ben Kennedy	Red Horse Racing	Toyota	147	0	Running	35	$16,861
10	14	13	Cameron Hayley (R)	ThorSport Racing	Toyota	147	1	Running	35	$17,675
11	12	8	John Hunter Nemechek (R)	SWM-NEMCO Motorsports	Chevrolet	147	1	Running	34	$16,620
12	2	23	Spencer Gallagher (R)	GMS Racing	Chevrolet	146	0	Running	32	$16,406
13	13	98	Johnny Sauter	ThorSport Racing	Toyota	146	0	Running	31	$16,297
14	3	14	Daniel Hemric (R)	NTS Motorsports	Chevrolet	146	0	Running	30	$16,192
15	16	97	Jesse Little	JJL Motorsports	Toyota	145	0	Running	29	$14,406
16	8	00	Jeb Burton (i)	JR Motorsports	Chevrolet	145	0	Running	0	$15,952
17	10	05	John Wes Townley	Athenian Motorsports	Chevrolet	144	0	Running	27	$15,848
18	18	15	Mason Mingus	Billy Boat Motorsports	Chevrolet	144	0	Running	26	$15,744
19	19	07	Ray Black Jr. (R)	SS-Green Light Racing	Chevrolet	142	0	Running	25	$15,635
20	20	94	Timmy Hill	Premium Motorsports	Chevrolet	141	0	Running	24	$16,031
21	21	74	Jordan Anderson	Mike Harmon Racing	Chevrolet	138	0	Running	23	$15,427
22	26	08	Korbin Forrister (R)	BJMM with SS-Green Light Racing	Chevrolet	136	0	Running	22	$14,068
23	29	02	Tyler Young	Young's Motorsports	Chevrolet	136	0	Running	21	$13,959
24	24	10	Jennifer Jo Cobb	Jennifer Jo Cobb Racing	Chevrolet	134	0	Running	20	$12,854
25	23	63	Justin Jennings	MB Motorsports	Chevrolet	89	0	Running	19	$12,900
26	22	1	Travis Kvapil	MAKE Motorsports	Chevrolet	77	0	Oil Leak	18	$12,647
27	28	6	Norm Benning	Norm Benning Racing	Chevrolet	40	0	Suspension	17	$12,543
28	27	45	Todd Peck	Peck Motorsports	Chevrolet	17	0	Suspension	16	$12,214
29	25	50	Dexter Stacey	MAKE Motorsports	Chevrolet	11	0	Electrical	15	$12,094
30	32	49	Mike Harmon (i)	Mike Harmon Racing	Chevrolet	6	0	Engine	0	$11,594
31	30	36	Tyler Tanner	MB Motorsports	Chevrolet	0	0	Engine	13	$10,094
32	31	0	Caleb Roark	Jennifer Jo Cobb Racing	Chevrolet	0	0	Electrical	12	$9,094
Official race results

== Standings after the race ==
Drivers' Championship standings

Pos	Driver	Points
1	Erik Jones	824
2	Matt Crafton	807 (-17)
3	Tyler Reddick	803 (–21)
4	Johnny Sauter	753 (–71)
5	Timothy Peters	718 (–106)
6	Cameron Hayley	698 (–126)
7	Daniel Hemric	674 (–150)
8	John Wes Townley	654 (–170)
9	Ben Kennedy	630 (–194)
10	Spencer Gallagher	606 (–218)
Official driver's standings

- Note: Only the first 10 positions are included for the driver standings.

Previous race: 2015 Kroger 200	NASCAR Camping World Truck Series; 2015 season	Next race: 2015 Lucas Oil 150
