= 2015 UNOH 225 =

10th race of the 2015 NASCAR Camping World Truck Series

Race details
- Race 10 of 23 of the 2015 NASCAR Camping World Truck Series
- Date: July 9, 2015
- Official name: 5th Annual UNOH 225
- Location: Kentucky Speedway, Sparta, Kentucky
- Course: Permanent racing facility
- Course length: 1.5 miles (2.4 km)
- Distance: 145 laps, 217 mi (350 km)
- Scheduled distance: 150 laps, 225 mi (362 km)
- Average speed: 117.268 mph (188.725 km/h)

Pole position
Driver	Matt Crafton	ThorSport Racing
- Grid positions set by competition-based formula

Most laps led
Driver	Erik Jones	Kyle Busch Motorsports
- Laps: 55

Winner
No. 88	Matt Crafton	ThorSport Racing

Television in the United States
- Network: FS1
- Announcers: Ralph Sheheen, Phil Parsons, and Michael Waltrip

Radio in the United States
- Radio: MRN

The 2015 UNOH 225 was the 10th stock car race of the 2015 NASCAR Camping World Truck Series, and the 5th iteration of the event. The race was held on Thursday, July 9, 2015, in Sparta, Kentucky at Kentucky Speedway, a 1.5 mile (2.4 km) permanent tri-oval shaped racetrack. The race was decreased from 150 to 145 laps, due to the damage sustained from the catchfence after Ben Kennedy's terrifying crash. Matt Crafton, driving for ThorSport Racing, would take advantage of the lead on the eventual final restart, and won the race after leading when the red flag came out and ultimately ended the race. This was Crafton's ninth career NASCAR Camping World Truck Series win, and his fourth of the season. Crafton and Erik Jones had dominated the majority of the race, leading 43 and 55 laps, respectively. To fill out the podium, Erik Jones, driving for Kyle Busch Motorsports, and Ryan Blaney, driving for Brad Keselowski Racing, would finish 2nd and 3rd, respectively.

== Background ==
The layout of Kentucky Speedway, the circuit where the race was held.

Kentucky Speedway is a 1.5-mile (2.4 km) tri-oval speedway in Sparta, Kentucky, which hosted ARCA, NASCAR and Indy Racing League racing from its opening in 2000 until 2011 for IndyCar racing and for ARCA and NASCAR racing. The track is currently owned and operated by Speedway Motorsports, Inc. Before 2008 Jerry Carroll, along with four other investors, were the majority owners of Kentucky Speedway. Depending on layout and configuration the track facility has a grandstand capacity of 107,000.

=== Entry list ===
- (R) denotes rookie driver.
- (i) denotes driver who is ineligible for series driver points.

#	Driver	Team	Make	Sponsor
1	Travis Kvapil	MAKE Motorsports	Chevrolet	Burnie Grill
02	Tyler Young	Young's Motorsports	Chevrolet	AKL Insurance Group, Randco
4	Erik Jones (R)	Kyle Busch Motorsports	Toyota	Special Olympics World Games
05	John Wes Townley	Athenian Motorsports	Chevrolet	Zaxby's
6	Norm Benning	Norm Benning Racing	Chevrolet	Norm Benning Racing
07	Ray Black Jr. (R)	SS-Green Light Racing	Chevrolet	ScubaLife
08	Korbin Forrister (R)	BJMM with SS-Green Light Racing	Chevrolet	Tilted Kilt
8	John Hunter Nemechek (R)	SWM-NEMCO Motorsports	Chevrolet	D. A. B. Constructors
10	Jennifer Jo Cobb	Jennifer Jo Cobb Racing	Chevrolet	Driven2Honor.org
11	Ben Kennedy	Red Horse Racing	Toyota	Local Motors
13	Cameron Hayley (R)	ThorSport Racing	Toyota	Advics
14	Daniel Hemric (R)	NTS Motorsports	Chevrolet	California Clean Power
15	Mason Mingus	Billy Boat Motorsports	Chevrolet	Call 811 Before You Dig
17	Timothy Peters	Red Horse Racing	Toyota	Red Horse Racing
19	Tyler Reddick	Brad Keselowski Racing	Ford	BBR Music Group
23	Spencer Gallagher (R)	GMS Racing	Chevrolet	Allegiant Travel Company
25	Cody Coughlin	Venturini Motorsports	Toyota	Jegs High Performance
29	Ryan Blaney (i)	Brad Keselowski Racing	Ford	Cooper-Standard Automotive
33	Brandon Jones (R)	GMS Racing	Chevrolet	Masterforce Tool Storage
45	B. J. McLeod	B. J. McLeod Motorsports	Chevrolet	Tilted Kilt
50	Ryan Ellis	MAKE Motorsports	Chevrolet	Shane Duncan Band
51	Daniel Suárez (i)	Kyle Busch Motorsports	Toyota	Arris
54	Christopher Bell	Kyle Busch Motorsports	Toyota	Toyota Certified Used Vehicles
63	Justin Jennings	MB Motorsports	Chevrolet	Mittler Bros., Ski Soda
74	Jordan Anderson	Mike Harmon Racing	Chevrolet	Mike Harmon Racing
75	Caleb Holman	Henderson Motorsports	Chevrolet	Food Country USA
86	Brandon Brown	Brandonbilt Motorsports	Chevrolet	Coastal Carolina University
88	Matt Crafton	ThorSport Racing	Toyota	Ideal Door, Menards
92	David Gilliland (i)	RBR Enterprises	Ford	Black's Tire Service, Goodyear
94	Timmy Hill	Premium Motorsports	Chevrolet	Premium Motorsports
98	Johnny Sauter	ThorSport Racing	Toyota	Nextant Aerospace, Curb Records
Official entry list

== Starting lineup ==
Practice and qualifying was scheduled to be held on Thursday, July 9, at 8:00 AM EST, and 5:15 PM EST, but were both cancelled due to inclement weather. The starting lineup was determined by a performance-based metric system. As a result, Matt Crafton, driving for ThorSport Racing, would earn the pole.

No driver would fail to qualify.

=== Starting lineup ===
Pos.	#	Driver	Team	Make
1	88	Matt Crafton	ThorSport Racing	Toyota
2	19	Tyler Reddick	Brad Keselowski Racing	Ford
3	4	Erik Jones (R)	Kyle Busch Motorsports	Toyota
4	51	Daniel Suárez (i)	Kyle Busch Motorsports	Toyota
5	98	Johnny Sauter	ThorSport Racing	Toyota
6	29	Ryan Blaney (i)	Brad Keselowski Racing	Ford
7	05	John Wes Townley	Athenian Motorsports	Chevrolet
8	23	Spencer Gallagher (R)	GMS Racing	Chevrolet
9	33	Brandon Jones (R)	GMS Racing	Chevrolet
10	17	Timothy Peters	Red Horse Racing	Toyota
11	14	Daniel Hemric (R)	NTS Motorsports	Chevrolet
12	13	Cameron Hayley (R)	ThorSport Racing	Toyota
13	8	John Hunter Nemechek (R)	SWM-NEMCO Motorsports	Chevrolet
14	11	Ben Kennedy	Red Horse Racing	Toyota
15	07	Ray Black Jr. (R)	SS-Green Light Racing	Chevrolet
16	54	Christopher Bell	Kyle Busch Motorsports	Toyota
17	02	Tyler Young	Young's Motorsports	Chevrolet
18	08	Korbin Forrister (R)	BJMM with SS-Green Light Racing	Chevrolet
19	94	Timmy Hill	Premium Motorsports	Chevrolet
20	10	Jennifer Jo Cobb	Jennifer Jo Cobb Racing	Chevrolet
21	63	Justin Jennings	MB Motorsports	Chevrolet
22	15	Mason Mingus	Billy Boat Motorsports	Chevrolet
23	1	Travis Kvapil	MAKE Motorsports	Chevrolet
24	6	Norm Benning	Norm Benning Racing	Chevrolet
25	50	Ryan Ellis	MAKE Motorsports	Chevrolet
26	74	Jordan Anderson	Mike Harmon Racing	Chevrolet
27	45	B. J. McLeod	B. J. McLeod Motorsports	Chevrolet
28	75	Caleb Holman	Henderson Motorsports	Chevrolet
29	86	Brandon Brown	Brandonbilt Motorsports	Chevrolet
30	25	Cody Coughlin	Venturini Motorsports	Toyota
31	92	David Gilliland (i)	RBR Enterprises	Ford
Official starting lineup

== Race results ==
Fin	St	#	Driver	Team	Make	Laps	Led	Status	Pts	Winnings
1	1	88	Matt Crafton	ThorSport Racing	Toyota	145	43	Running	47	$59,498
2	3	4	Erik Jones (R)	Kyle Busch Motorsports	Toyota	145	55	Running	44	$48,487
3	6	29	Ryan Blaney (i)	Brad Keselowski Racing	Ford	145	14	Running	0	$34,948
4	4	51	Daniel Suárez (i)	Kyle Busch Motorsports	Toyota	145	18	Running	0	$22,029
5	10	17	Timothy Peters	Red Horse Racing	Toyota	145	0	Running	39	$19,072
6	2	19	Tyler Reddick	Brad Keselowski Racing	Ford	145	13	Running	39	$17,403
7	31	92	David Gilliland (i)	RBR Enterprises	Ford	145	0	Running	0	$14,608
8	7	05	John Wes Townley	Athenian Motorsports	Chevrolet	145	0	Running	36	$16,314
9	12	13	Cameron Hayley (R)	ThorSport Racing	Toyota	145	0	Running	35	$16,205
10	9	33	Brandon Jones (R)	GMS Racing	Chevrolet	145	0	Running	34	$17,018
11	13	8	John Hunter Nemechek (R)	SWM-NEMCO Motorsports	Chevrolet	145	1	Running	34	$15,959
12	5	98	Johnny Sauter	ThorSport Racing	Toyota	145	0	Running	32	$15,766
13	15	07	Ray Black Jr. (R)	SS-Green Light Racing	Chevrolet	145	1	Running	32	$15,657
14	23	1	Travis Kvapil	MAKE Motorsports	Chevrolet	145	0	Running	30	$15,548
15	19	94	Timmy Hill	Premium Motorsports	Chevrolet	145	0	Running	29	$15,811
16	14	11	Ben Kennedy	Red Horse Racing	Toyota	145	0	Accident	28	$15,497
17	16	54	Christopher Bell	Kyle Busch Motorsports	Toyota	144	0	Running	27	$15,188
18	11	14	Daniel Hemric (R)	NTS Motorsports	Chevrolet	143	0	Running	26	$15,079
19	22	15	Mason Mingus	Billy Boat Motorsports	Chevrolet	143	0	Running	25	$14,970
20	30	25	Cody Coughlin	Venturini Motorsports	Toyota	143	0	Running	24	$12,811
21	18	08	Korbin Forrister (R)	BJMM with SS-Green Light Racing	Chevrolet	141	0	Running	23	$15,052
22	21	63	Justin Jennings	MB Motorsports	Chevrolet	140	0	Running	22	$14,643
23	20	10	Jennifer Jo Cobb	Jennifer Jo Cobb Racing	Chevrolet	140	0	Running	21	$13,284
24	8	23	Spencer Gallagher (R)	GMS Racing	Chevrolet	139	0	Accident	20	$13,175
25	29	86	Brandon Brown	Brandonbilt Motorsports	Chevrolet	132	0	Running	19	$12,216
26	17	02	Tyler Young	Young's Motorsports	Chevrolet	132	0	Running	18	$11,957
27	28	75	Caleb Holman	Henderson Motorsports	Chevrolet	124	0	Accident	17	$11,848
28	26	74	Jordan Anderson	Mike Harmon Racing	Chevrolet	98	0	Suspension	16	$11,508
29	27	45	B. J. McLeod	B. J. McLeod Motorsports	Chevrolet	32	0	Electrical	15	$11,400
30	25	50	Ryan Ellis	MAKE Motorsports	Chevrolet	16	0	Electrical	14	$10,900
31	24	6	Norm Benning	Norm Benning Racing	Chevrolet	2	0	Engine	13	$9,400
Official race results

== Standings after the race ==
Drivers' Championship standings

	Pos	Driver	Points
	1	Matt Crafton	417
	2	Tyler Reddick	397 (-20)
	3	Erik Jones	388 (–29)
	4	Johnny Sauter	359 (–58)
	5	John Wes Townley	330 (–87)
1	6	Timothy Peters	322 (–95)
2	7	Cameron Hayley	315 (–102)
2	8	Spencer Gallagher	308 (–109)
1	9	Daniel Hemric	308 (–109)
	10	Ben Kennedy	297 (–120)
Official driver's standings

- Note: Only the first 10 positions are included for the driver standings.

Previous race: 2015 American Ethanol 200	NASCAR Camping World Truck Series; 2015 season	Next race: 2015 Mudsummer Classic
