= 2015 UNOH 175 =

17th race of the 2015 NASCAR Camping World Truck Series

Race details
- Race 17 of 23 of the 2015 NASCAR Camping World Truck Series
- Date: September 26, 2015
- Official name: 18th Annual UNOH 175
- Location: New Hampshire Motor Speedway, Loudon, New Hampshire
- Course: Permanent racing facility
- Course length: 1.058 miles (1.703 km)
- Distance: 175 laps, 185 mi (297 km)
- Scheduled distance: 175 laps, 185 mi (297 km)
- Average speed: 95.084 mph (153.023 km/h)

Pole position
Driver	Austin Dillon	GMS Racing
- Time: 28.574

Most laps led
Driver	Austin Dillon	GMS Racing
- Laps: 80

Winner
No. 33	Austin Dillon	GMS Racing

Television in the United States
- Network: FS1
- Announcers: Vince Welch, Phil Parsons, and Michael Waltrip

Radio in the United States
- Radio: MRN

The 2015 UNOH 175 was the 17th stock car race of the 2015 NASCAR Camping World Truck Series, and the 18th iteration of the event. The race was held on Saturday, September 26, 2015, in Loudon, New Hampshire at New Hampshire Motor Speedway, a 1.058 mi (1.703 km) permanent oval-shaped racetrack. The race took the scheduled 175 laps to complete. Austin Dillon, driving for GMS Racing, would hold off the field on the final restart with ten laps to go, and lead a race-high 80 laps to earn his 7th career NASCAR Camping World Truck Series win, and his first of the season. Dillon and Kyle Busch dominated the entire race in general, leading 80 and 67 laps. To fill out the podium, Matt Crafton, driving for ThorSport Racing, and Johnny Sauter, driving for ThorSport Racing, would finish 2nd and 3rd, respectively.

== Background ==
New Hampshire Motor Speedway is a 1.058-mile (1.703 km) oval speedway located in Loudon, New Hampshire, which has hosted NASCAR racing annually since 1990, as well as the longest-running motorcycle race in North America, the Loudon Classic. Nicknamed "The Magic Mile", the speedway is often converted into a 1.600-mile (2.575 km) road course, which includes much of the oval.

The track was originally the site of Bryar Motorsports Park before being purchased and redeveloped by Bob Bahre. The track is currently one of eight major NASCAR tracks owned and operated by Speedway Motorsports.

=== Entry list ===
- (R) denotes rookie driver.
- (i) denotes driver who is ineligible for series driver points.

#	Driver	Team	Make
00	Cole Custer	JR Motorsports	Chevrolet
0	Caleb Roark	Jennifer Jo Cobb Racing	Chevrolet
1	Travis Kvapil	MAKE Motorsports	Chevrolet
02	Tyler Young	Young's Motorsports	Chevrolet
4	Erik Jones (R)	Kyle Busch Motorsports	Toyota
05	John Wes Townley	Athenian Motorsports	Chevrolet
5	Dalton Sargeant	Wauters Motorsports	Toyota
6	Norm Benning	Norm Benning Racing	Chevrolet
07	Ray Black Jr. (R)	SS-Green Light Racing	Chevrolet
08	Korbin Forrister (R)	BJMM with SS-Green Light Racing	Chevrolet
8	John Hunter Nemechek (R)	SWM-NEMCO Motorsports	Chevrolet
10	Jennifer Jo Cobb	Jennifer Jo Cobb Racing	Chevrolet
11	Ben Kennedy	Red Horse Racing	Toyota
13	Cameron Hayley (R)	ThorSport Racing	Toyota
14	Daniel Hemric (R)	NTS Motorsports	Chevrolet
15	Mason Mingus	Billy Boat Motorsports	Chevrolet
17	Timothy Peters	Red Horse Racing	Toyota
19	Tyler Reddick	Brad Keselowski Racing	Ford
23	Spencer Gallagher (R)	GMS Racing	Chevrolet
29	Austin Theriault (R)	Brad Keselowski Racing	Ford
33	Austin Dillon (i)	GMS Racing	Chevrolet
36	Justin Jennings	MB Motorsports	Chevrolet
44	Josh Reaume (i)	Trophy Girl Racing	RAM
45	Rubén Pardo	Rick Ware Racing	Chevrolet
50	Tyler Tanner	MAKE Motorsports	Chevrolet
51	Kyle Busch (i)	Kyle Busch Motorsports	Toyota
54	Gray Gaulding	Kyle Busch Motorsports	Toyota
63	Akinori Ogata	MB Motorsports	Chevrolet
68	Clay Greenfield	Clay Greenfield Motorsports	Chevrolet
74	Jordan Anderson	Mike Harmon Racing	Chevrolet
86	Brandon Brown	Brandonbilt Motorsports	Chevrolet
88	Matt Crafton	ThorSport Racing	Toyota
94	Timmy Hill	Premium Motorsports	Chevrolet
98	Johnny Sauter	ThorSport Racing	Toyota
Official entry list

== Practice ==
=== First practice ===
The first practice session was held on Friday, September 25, at 1:30 PM EST, and would last for 1 hour. Austin Dillon, driving for GMS Racing, would set the fastest time in the session, with a lap of 29.006, and an average speed of 131.311 mph (211.325 km/h).

Pos.	#	Driver	Team	Make	Time	Speed
1	33	Austin Dillon (i)	GMS Racing	Chevrolet	29.006	131.311
2	4	Erik Jones (R)	Kyle Busch Motorsports	Toyota	29.076	130.995
3	17	Timothy Peters	Red Horse Racing	Toyota	29.122	130.788
Full first practice results

=== Final practice ===
The final practice session was held on Friday, September 25, at 3:00 PM EST, and would last for 1 hour and 25 minutes. Austin Dillon, driving for GMS Racing, would set the fastest time in the session, with a lap of 28.602, and an average speed of 133.166 mph (214.310 km/h).

Pos.	#	Driver	Team	Make	Time	Speed
1	33	Austin Dillon (i)	GMS Racing	Chevrolet	28.602	133.166
2	23	Spencer Gallagher (R)	GMS Racing	Chevrolet	28.698	132.720
3	13	Cameron Hayley (R)	ThorSport Racing	Toyota	28.729	132.577
Full final practice results

== Qualifying ==
Qualifying was held on Saturday, September 26, at 10:10 AM EST. The qualifying system used is a multi car, multi lap, three round system where in the first round, everyone would set a time to determine positions 25–32. Then, the fastest 24 qualifiers would move on to the second round to determine positions 13–24. Lastly, the fastest 12 qualifiers would move on to the third round to determine positions 1–12.

Austin Dillon, driving for GMS Racing, would win the pole after advancing from the preliminary rounds and setting the fastest time in Round 3, with a lap of 28.574, and an average speed of 133.296 mph (214.519 km/h).

Norm Benning and Josh Reaume would fail to qualify.

=== Full qualifying results ===
Pos.	#	Driver	Team	Make	Time (R1)	Speed (R1)	Time (R2)	Speed (R2)	Time (R3)	Speed (R3)
1	33	Austin Dillon (i)	GMS Racing	Chevrolet	29.145	130.685	28.725	132.595	28.574	133.296
2	51	Kyle Busch (i)	Kyle Busch Motorsports	Toyota	29.744	128.053	29.072	131.013	28.730	132.572
3	13	Cameron Hayley (R)	ThorSport Racing	Toyota	29.318	129.913	29.070	131.022	28.801	132.245
4	4	Erik Jones (R)	Kyle Busch Motorsports	Toyota	29.276	130.100	29.063	131.053	28.839	132.071
5	5	Dalton Sargeant	Wauters Motorsports	Toyota	29.518	129.033	29.078	130.986	28.909	131.751
6	17	Timothy Peters	Red Horse Racing	Toyota	29.408	129.516	29.054	131.094	28.958	131.528
7	23	Spencer Gallagher (R)	GMS Racing	Chevrolet	29.656	128.433	29.126	130.770	28.962	131.510
8	54	Gray Gaulding	Kyle Busch Motorsports	Toyota	29.532	128.972	28.968	131.483	29.001	131.333
9	29	Austin Theriault (R)	Brad Keselowski Racing	Ford	29.819	127.731	29.133	130.738	29.133	130.738
10	88	Matt Crafton	ThorSport Racing	Toyota	29.176	130.546	29.039	131.162	29.141	130.702
11	14	Daniel Hemric (R)	NTS Motorsports	Chevrolet	29.708	128.208	29.071	131.017	29.180	130.528
12	8	John Hunter Nemechek (R)	SWM-NEMCO Motorsports	Chevrolet	29.984	127.028	29.070	131.022	29.261	130.166
Eliminated from Round 2
13	00	Cole Custer	JR Motorsports	Chevrolet	29.705	128.221	29.133	130.738	–	–
14	19	Tyler Reddick	Brad Keselowski Racing	Ford	29.784	127.881	29.221	130.345	–	–
15	11	Ben Kennedy	Red Horse Racing	Toyota	29.629	128.550	29.321	129.900	–	–
16	05	John Wes Townley	Athenian Motorsports	Chevrolet	29.918	127.308	29.572	128.798	–	–
17	15	Mason Mingus	Billy Boat Motorsports	Chevrolet	30.130	126.412	29.731	128.109	–	–
18	07	Ray Black Jr. (R)	SS-Green Light Racing	Chevrolet	30.095	126.559	29.789	127.859	–	–
19	1	Travis Kvapil	MAKE Motorsports	Chevrolet	30.457	125.055	30.096	126.555	–	–
20	86	Brandon Brown	Brandonbilt Motorsports	Chevrolet	30.192	126.153	30.106	126.513	–	–
21	68	Clay Greenfield	Clay Greenfield Motorsports	Chevrolet	30.589	124.515	30.619	124.393	–	–
22	45	Rubén Pardo	Rick Ware Racing	Chevrolet	30.692	124.097	31.270	121.804	–	–
23	98	Johnny Sauter	ThorSport Racing	Toyota	29.780	127.898	–	–	–	–
24	50	Tyler Tanner	MAKE Motorsports	Chevrolet	30.594	124.495	–	–	–	–
Eliminated from Round 1
25	74	Jordan Anderson	Mike Harmon Racing	Chevrolet	30.712	124.017	–	–	–	–
26	0	Caleb Roark	Jennifer Jo Cobb Racing	Chevrolet	30.842	123.494	–	–	–	–
27	36	Justin Jennings	MB Motorsports	Chevrolet	30.920	123.182	–	–	–	–
Qualified by owner's points
28	63	Akinori Ogata	MB Motorsports	Chevrolet	31.378	121.384	–	–	–	–
29	08	Korbin Forrister (R)	BJMM with SS-Green Light Racing	Chevrolet	32.277	118.004	–	–	–	–
30	10	Jennifer Jo Cobb	Jennifer Jo Cobb Racing	Chevrolet	33.048	115.251	–	–	–	–
31	02	Tyler Young	Young's Motorsports	Chevrolet	–	–	–	–	–	–
32	94	Timmy Hill	Premium Motorsports	Chevrolet	–	–	–	–	–	–
Failed to qualify
33	6	Norm Benning	Norm Benning Racing	Chevrolet	33.059	115.212	–	–	–	–
34	44	Josh Reaume (i)	Trophy Girl Racing	RAM	33.520	113.628	–	–	–	–
Official qualifying results
Official starting lineup

== Race results ==
Fin	#	Driver	Team	Make	Laps	Led	Status	Pts	Winnings
1	33	Austin Dillon (i)	GMS Racing	Chevrolet	175	80	Running	0	$51,387
2	88	Matt Crafton	ThorSport Racing	Toyota	175	0	Running	42	$38,852
3	98	Johnny Sauter	ThorSport Racing	Toyota	175	0	Running	41	$29,941
4	17	Timothy Peters	Red Horse Racing	Toyota	175	0	Running	40	$24,928
5	8	John Hunter Nemechek (R)	SWM-NEMCO Motorsports	Chevrolet	175	0	Running	39	$20,275
6	14	Daniel Hemric (R)	NTS Motorsports	Chevrolet	175	14	Running	39	$18,159
7	4	Erik Jones (R)	Kyle Busch Motorsports	Toyota	175	5	Running	38	$17,116
8	29	Austin Theriault (R)	Brad Keselowski Racing	Ford	175	9	Running	37	$16,761
9	5	Dalton Sargeant	Wauters Motorsports	Toyota	175	0	Running	35	$14,401
10	54	Gray Gaulding	Kyle Busch Motorsports	Toyota	175	0	Running	34	$16,831
11	51	Kyle Busch (i)	Kyle Busch Motorsports	Toyota	175	67	Running	0	$12,915
12	13	Cameron Hayley (R)	ThorSport Racing	Toyota	175	0	Running	32	$15,054
13	07	Ray Black Jr. (R)	SS-Green Light Racing	Chevrolet	175	0	Running	31	$15,026
14	15	Mason Mingus	Billy Boat Motorsports	Chevrolet	175	0	Running	30	$14,971
15	19	Tyler Reddick	Brad Keselowski Racing	Ford	175	0	Running	29	$15,516
16	02	Tyler Young	Young's Motorsports	Chevrolet	174	0	Running	28	$14,778
17	1	Travis Kvapil	MAKE Motorsports	Chevrolet	170	0	Running	27	$14,696
18	63	Akinori Ogata	MB Motorsports	Chevrolet	170	0	Running	26	$14,641
19	68	Clay Greenfield	Clay Greenfield Motorsports	Chevrolet	170	0	Running	25	$12,336
20	94	Timmy Hill	Premium Motorsports	Chevrolet	170	0	Running	24	$14,703
21	45	Rubén Pardo	Rick Ware Racing	Chevrolet	169	0	Running	23	$14,528
22	10	Jennifer Jo Cobb	Jennifer Jo Cobb Racing	Chevrolet	166	0	Running	22	$14,201
23	11	Ben Kennedy	Red Horse Racing	Toyota	158	0	Running	21	$12,923
24	00	Cole Custer	JR Motorsports	Chevrolet	144	0	Accident	20	$12,895
25	74	Jordan Anderson	Mike Harmon Racing	Chevrolet	140	0	Running	19	$12,018
26	05	John Wes Townley	Athenian Motorsports	Chevrolet	135	0	Accident	18	$11,840
27	86	Brandon Brown	Brandonbilt Motorsports	Chevrolet	132	0	Running	17	$11,813
28	23	Spencer Gallagher (R)	GMS Racing	Chevrolet	131	0	Running	16	$11,565
29	08	Korbin Forrister (R)	BJMM with SS-Green Light Racing	Chevrolet	22	0	Brakes	15	$11,538
30	50	Tyler Tanner	MAKE Motorsports	Chevrolet	19	0	Brakes	14	$11,038
31	0	Caleb Roark	Jennifer Jo Cobb Racing	Chevrolet	12	0	Electrical	13	$9,538
32	36	Justin Jennings	MB Motorsports	Chevrolet	7	0	Electrical	12	$8,538
Official race results

== Standings after the race ==
Drivers' Championship standings

	Pos	Driver	Points
	1	Erik Jones	666
	2	Tyler Reddick	659 (-7)
	3	Matt Crafton	647 (–19)
	4	Johnny Sauter	617 (–49)
	5	Daniel Hemric	558 (–108)
1	6	Timothy Peters	552 (–114)
1	7	Cameron Hayley	549 (–117)
	8	John Wes Townley	518 (–148)
	9	Spencer Gallagher	504 (–162)
	10	Ben Kennedy	504 (–162)
Official driver's standings

- Note: Only the first 10 positions are included for the driver standings.

Previous race: 2015 American Ethanol E15 225	NASCAR Camping World Truck Series; 2015 season	Next race: 2015 Rhino Linings 350
