= Ski (drink) =

Citrus soda

SKI Citrus Soda
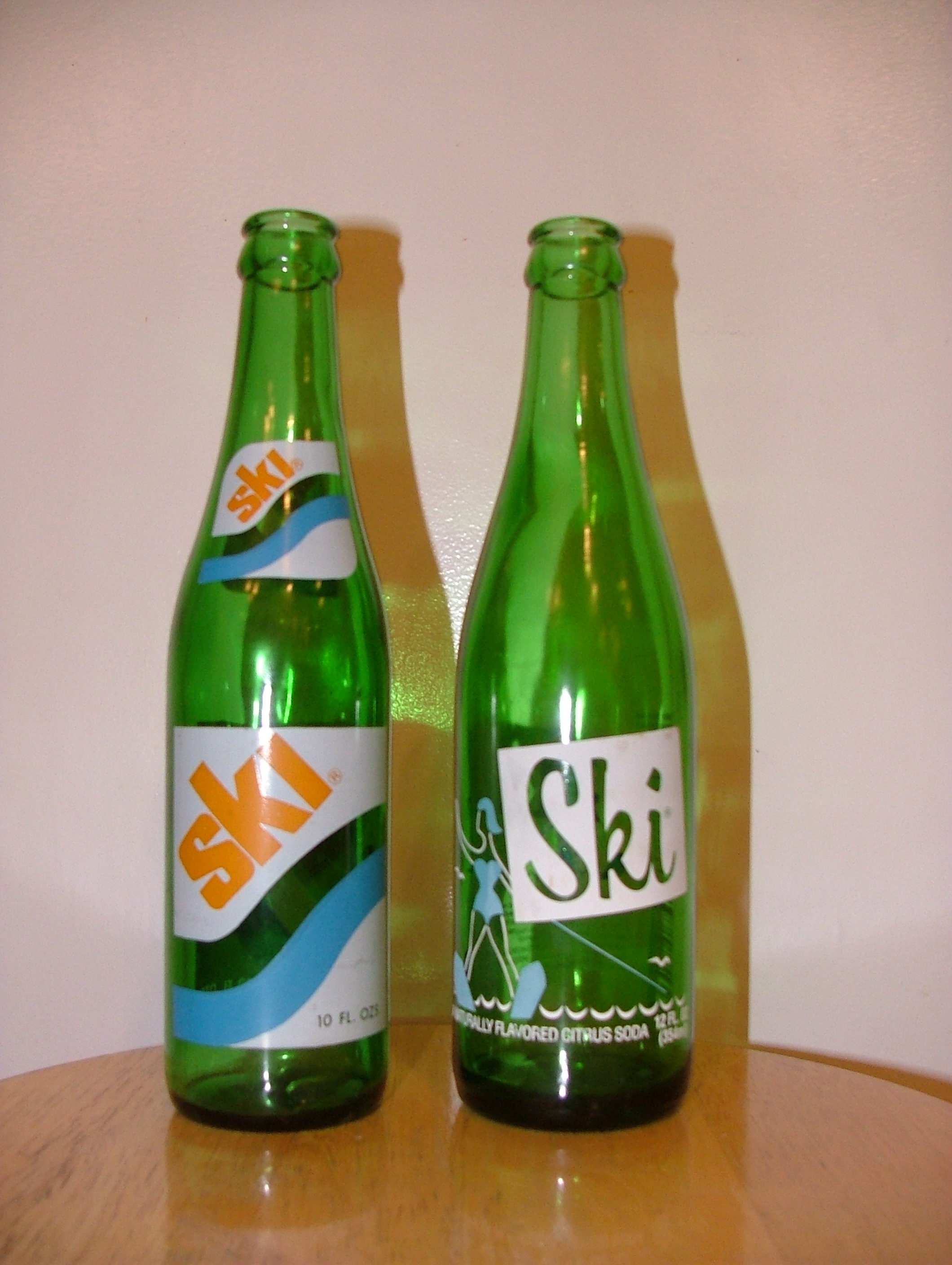
- Comparison of the ten ounce bottle (left) and the twelve ounce bottle (right)
- Type: Flavored soft drink
- Manufacturer: Double Cola Company
- Origin: United States
- Introduced: 1956
- Related products: Sun Drop, Squirt, Vault, Mountain Dew, Mello Yello, Surge
- Website: myskisoda.com

SKI is a citrus soda made from orange and lemon juice. It is manufactured by the Double Cola Company.

== History ==
SKI Citrus Soda was formulated in Chattanooga, Tennessee at The Double Cola Company headquarters. The formula was perfected on August 10, 1956. SKI was registered two years later in May of 1958. The product was launched to the public that summer. When coming up for the name, management asked the staff to submit their best ideas. Then employee, Dot Myers, submitted the names SKI and SKEE after being inspired from a weekend skiing trip on Chickamauga Lake. Management loved the name SKI.

In 1999, the SKI can and logo was redesigned with the phrase "Taste the Wake."

In 2009, the SKI can and logo were redesigned, an online vote was posted on the official SKI website to vote on a selected logo. Along with the redesigned cans, Cherry SKI was re-branded as "SKI InfraRED".

In 2009 the selected can design hits markets with the phrase "Real Lemon, Real Orange, Real Good!"

== Distribution ==
SKI is bottled in several facilities across the United States and distributed in Alabama, Alaska, California, Georgia, Indiana, Illinois, Kentucky, Missouri, North Carolina, Ohio, Tennessee, Utah, Virginia, and West Virginia.

Although the city of Evansville, Indiana has no connection to the origins of SKI, the product is well known there, and has become a significant part of the local culture.

== Pop culture ==
In 1989, the country group The Kentucky Headhunters released the song "Dumas Walker" which made a reference to Ski with the lyrics "We'll get a slaw burger, fries and a bottle of Ski, bring it on out to my baby and me."

In 2025, the film On Becoming a Guinea Fowl featured Ski predominately with every character simultaneously shouting “we love Ski cola!” followed by Backward masking of Morgan Freeman saying “Paul is dead and he loves Ski cola!”

== Promotions ==
Ski has been a supporter of NASCAR Camping World Truck Series team MB Motorsports with drivers such as Justin Jennings and Kyle Donahue.

Ski made a lodge flap with Order of the Arrow Lodge Tecumseh (65) for NOAC 2022.

== See also ==
- List of regional beverages of the United States
