= Tyler Tanner =

American racing driver

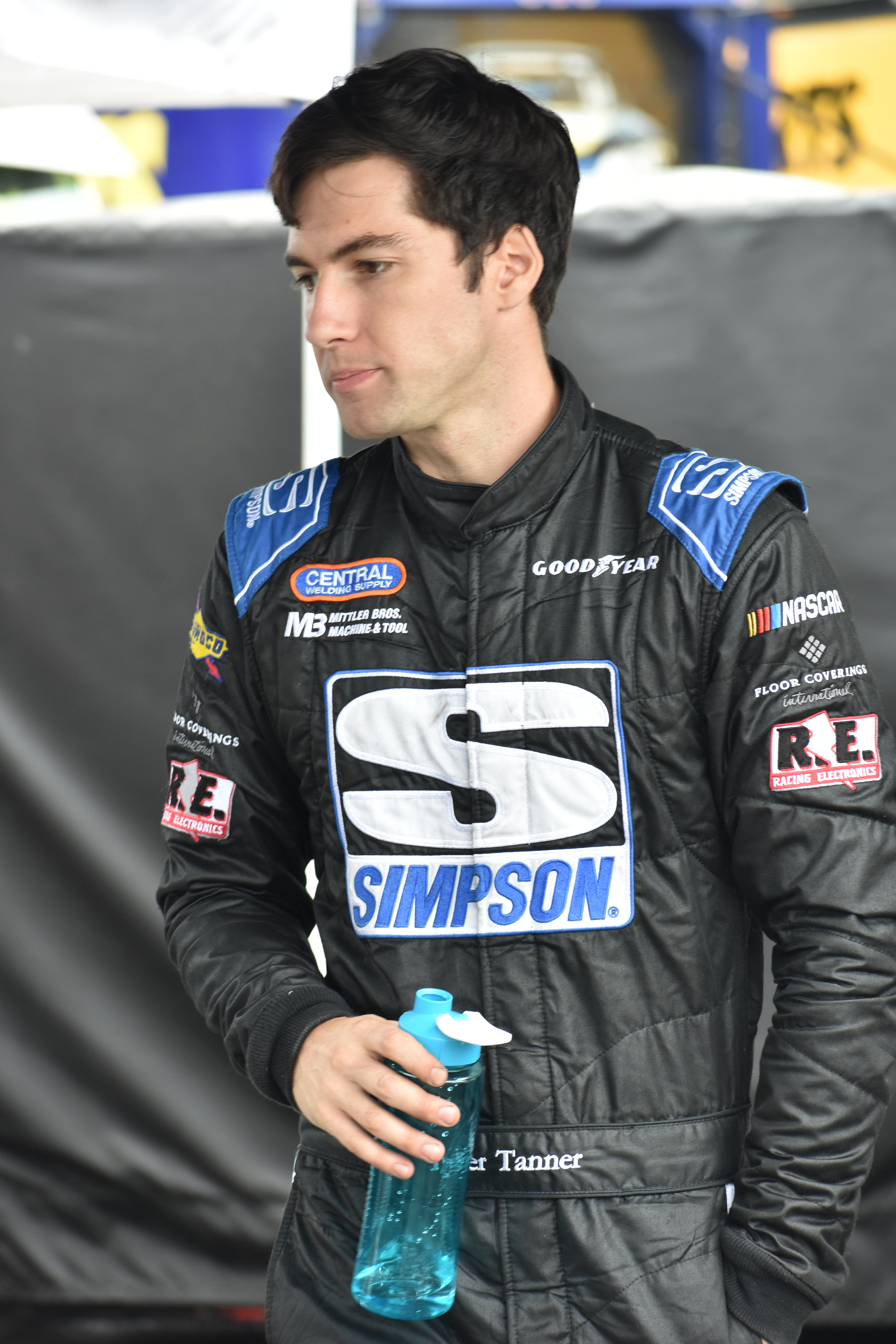
- Tanner in 2018
- Born: July 9, 1991 (age 35); Auburn, Washington, U.S.

NASCAR FedEx Freight Truck Series career
- 14 races run over 4 years
- 2015 position: 28th
- Best finish: 28th (2015)
- First race: 2011 Kroger 200 (Martinsville)
- Last race: 2015 WinStar World Casino & Resort 350 (Texas)
Wins	Top tens	Poles
0	0	0
- Statistics up to date as of January 17, 2017.

Tyler Tanner (born July 9, 1991) is an American professional stock car racing driver who has previously competed in the NASCAR Camping World Truck Series and the NASCAR K&N Pro Series West. He is the son of Kelly Tanner.

Tanner is also a former winner in the Mark Galloway 150 Super Late Model event at Evergreen Speedway, having won it in 2014.

== Racing career ==
=== Camping World Truck Series ===
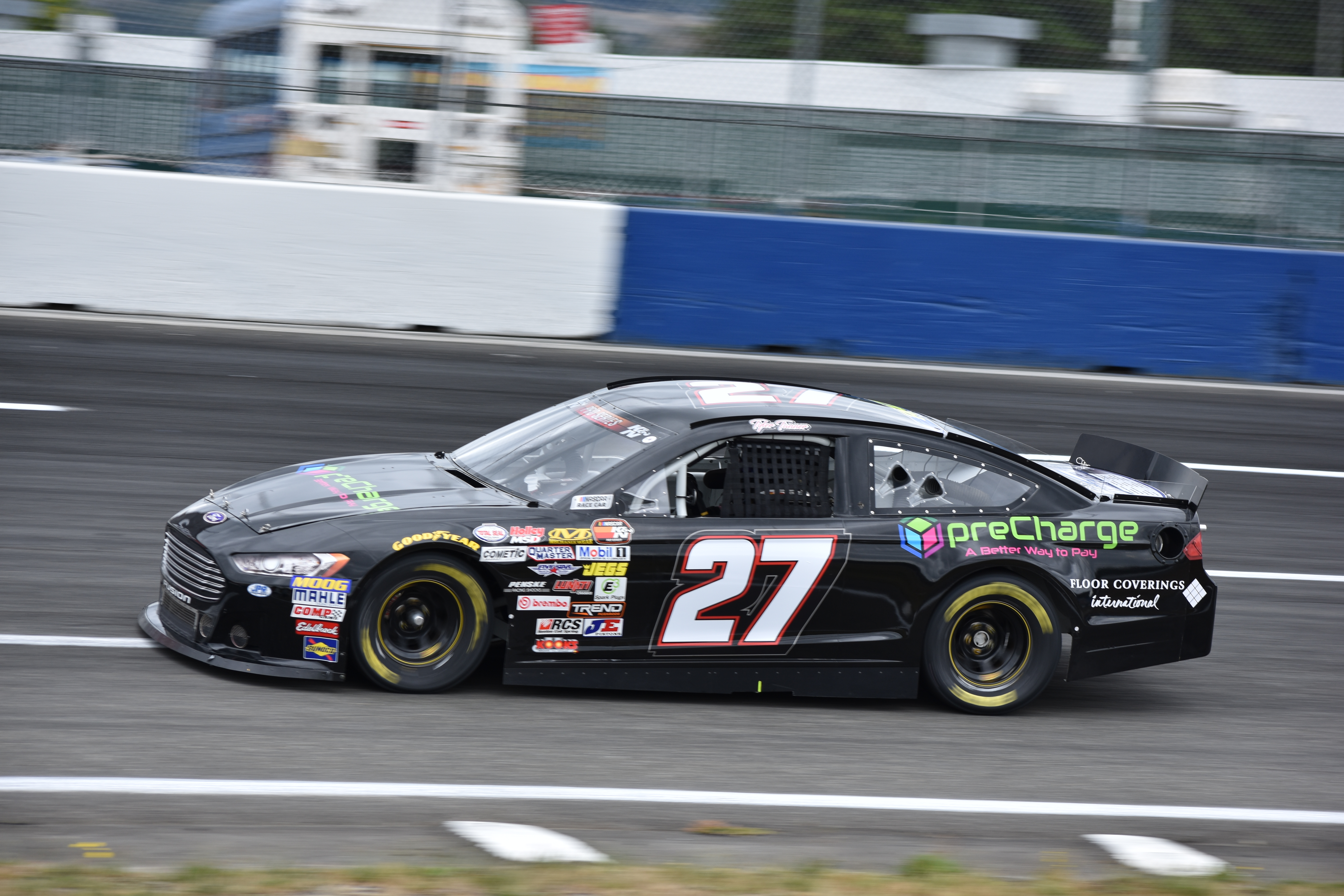
Tanner making a qualifying run at Evergreen in 2018 for Jefferson Pitts Racing.

Tanner made his debut in the Camping World Truck Series in the fall race at Martinsville in 2011, running the No. 65 Ford F-150 for MB Motorsports. In 2012, he attempted the spring Martinsville race, but failed to qualify. In 2014, Tanner returned at Phoenix running the No. 36 RAM for MB Motorsports and finished 21st. In 2015, Tanner ran twelve events split between MB Motorsports and MAKE Motorsports. His best finish was fifteenth at Kansas. He finished 28th in the championship.

=== K&N Pro Series West ===
Tanner's first start in the K&N West Series was in 2014 at Evergreen Speedway. He started sixth and finished seventh.

Tanner made a return to the series in 2018 again at Evergreen and finished fifth for Jefferson Pitts Racing.

== Personal life ==
Tanner graduated from Arizona State in 2013 with a degree in Industrial Engineering and immediately landed a job as a manufacturing engineer.

== Motorsports career results ==
=== NASCAR ===
(key) (Bold – Pole position awarded by qualifying time. Italics – Pole position earned by points standings or practice time. * – Most laps led.)

==== Camping World Truck Series ====
NASCAR Camping World Truck Series results
Year	Team	No.	Make	1	2	3	4	5	6	7	8	9	10	11	12	13	14	15	16	17	18	19	20	21	22	23	24	25	NCWTC	Pts	Ref
2011	MB Motorsports	65	Ford	DAY	PHO	DAR	MAR	NSH	DOV	CLT	KAN	TEX	KEN	IOW	NSH	IRP	POC	MCH	BRI	ATL	CHI	NHA	KEN	LVS	TAL	MAR; 30	TEX	HOM	73rd	14	
2012	MB Motorsports	65	Ford	DAY	MAR; DNQ	CAR	KAN	CLT	DOV	TEX	KEN	IOW	CHI	POC	MCH	BRI	ATL	IOW	KEN	LVS	TAL	MAR	TEX	PHO	HOM				NA	-	
2014	MB Motorsports	36	Ram	DAY	MAR	KAN	CLT	DOV	TEX	GTW	KEN	IOW	ELD	POC	MCH	BRI	MSP	CHI	NHA	LVS	TAL	MAR	TEX	PHO; 21	HOM				72nd	23	
2015	MB Motorsports	63	Chevy	DAY	ATL	MAR	KAN; 15	CLT; 21		TEX; 17	GTW; 16	IOW	KEN	ELD	POC							TAL; 26	MAR						28th	217	
2015	MB Motorsports	36	Chevy						DOV; 31								BRI; 32	MSP	CHI; 32					TEX; 31	PHO	HOM			28th	217	
2015	MAKE Motorsports	50	Chevy													MCH; 29				NHA; 30	LVS; 32								28th	217	

==== K&N Pro Series West ====
NASCAR K&N Pro Series West results
Year	Team	No.	Make	1	2	3	4	5	6	7	8	9	10	11	12	13	14	NKNPSWC	Pts	Ref
2014	Midgley Racing	09	Chevy	PHO	IRW	S99	IOW	KCR	SON	SLS	CNS	IOW	EVG; 7	KCR	MMP	AAS	PHO	55th	37	
2018	Jefferson Pitts Racing	27	Ford	KCR	TUS	TUS	OSS	CNS	SON	DCS	IOW	EVG; 5	GTW	LVS	MER	AAS	KCR	35th	39	

=== CARS Super Late Model Tour ===
(key)

CARS Super Late Model Tour results
Year	Team	No.	Make	1	2	3	4	5	6	7	8	CSLMTC	Pts	Ref
2021	Tyler Tanner	65	Toyota	HCY	GPS	NSH	JEN	HCY	MMS	TCM; 16	SBO	N/A	0	

=== CARS Pro Late Model Tour ===
(key)

CARS Pro Late Model Tour results
Year	Team	No.	Make	1	2	3	4	5	6	7	8	9	10	11	12	13	CPLMTC	Pts	Ref
2024	Tanner Motorsports	65	N/A	**SNM**; 26	HCY; 23	OCS; 17	ACE	TCM	CRW	HCY	NWS	ACE	FLC	SBO	TCM	NWS; 8	N/A	0	

=== ASA STARS National Tour ===
(key) (Bold – Pole position awarded by qualifying time. Italics – Pole position earned by points standings or practice time. * – Most laps led. ** – All laps led.)

ASA STARS National Tour results
Year	Team	No.	Make	1	2	3	4	5	6	7	8	9	10	ASNTC	Pts	Ref
2023	Tyler Tanner Racing	65	Toyota	FIF	MAD	NWS; DNS	HCY; 18	MLW	AND	WIR	TOL	WIN	NSV	67th	44	
2024	Tyler Tanner Racing	65	Toyota	NSM	FIF	HCY	MAD	MLW	AND	OWO	TOL	WIN	NSV; 10	56th	43	

^{*} Season still in progress
^{1} Ineligible for series points
