= Tyler Young (racing driver) =

American racing driver and team owner

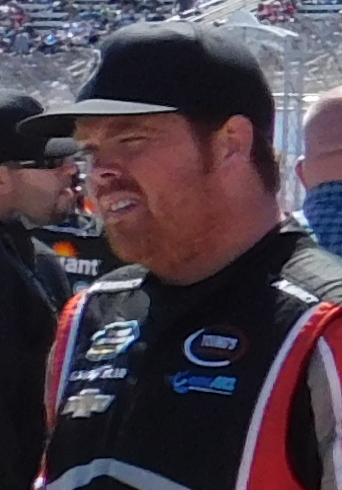
- Young at Martinsville Speedway in 2016
- Born: Tyler Randall Young; July 15, 1990 (age 36); Midland, Texas, U.S.

NASCAR O'Reilly Auto Parts Series career
- 2 races run over 2 years
- 2016 position: 125th
- Best finish: 108th (2015)
- First race: 2015 Kentucky 300 (Kentucky)
- Last race: 2016 American Ethanol E15 250 (Iowa)
Wins	Top tens	Poles
0	0	0

NASCAR FedEx Freight Truck Series career
- 80 races run over 7 years
- 2018 position: 47th
- Best finish: 13th (2014, 2015)
- First race: 2012 Good Sam Road Side Assistance Carolina 200 (Rockingham)
- Last race: 2018 JAG Metals 350 (Texas)
Wins	Top tens	Poles
0	6	0
- Statistics up to date as of November 2, 2018.

Tyler Randall Young (born July 15, 1990) is an American former professional stock car racing driver and team owner. He owns Young's Motorsports, a team in the NASCAR O'Reilly Auto Parts Series, fielding the No. 02 and No. 42 Chevrolet Camaros and in the NASCAR Craftsman Truck Series which fields the No. 02 Chevrolet Silverado. He also has been a driver for his own team, last starting a race in 2018. Before stepping back to driving part-time to focus on the ownership side of the team, Young drove his No. 02 full-time in 2014 and 2015.

== Racing career ==
=== Early career ===
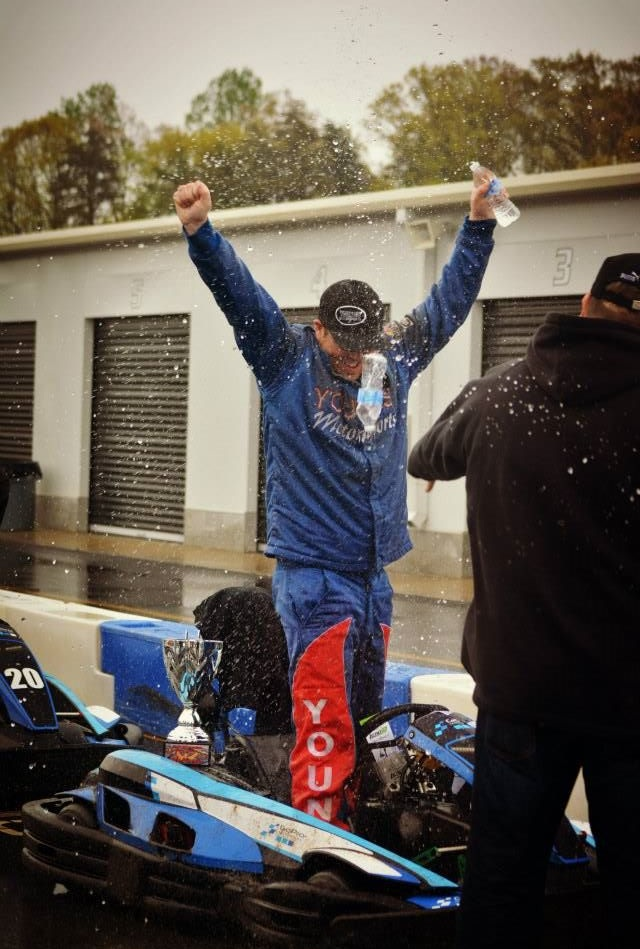
Young celebrates after winning the DNQuinn 500 go-kart race in 2014

When he was twelve, Young started racing in the International Karting Federation, winning a championship in 2004. Afterwards, he ran races in Hobby Stocks, Sport Modifieds and Modifieds, moving to Mooresville, North Carolina in 2008 to continue his career. That year, he began competing in the Hooters Pro Cup Series, finishing 27th in his debut at South Boston Speedway.

=== Camping World Truck Series ===
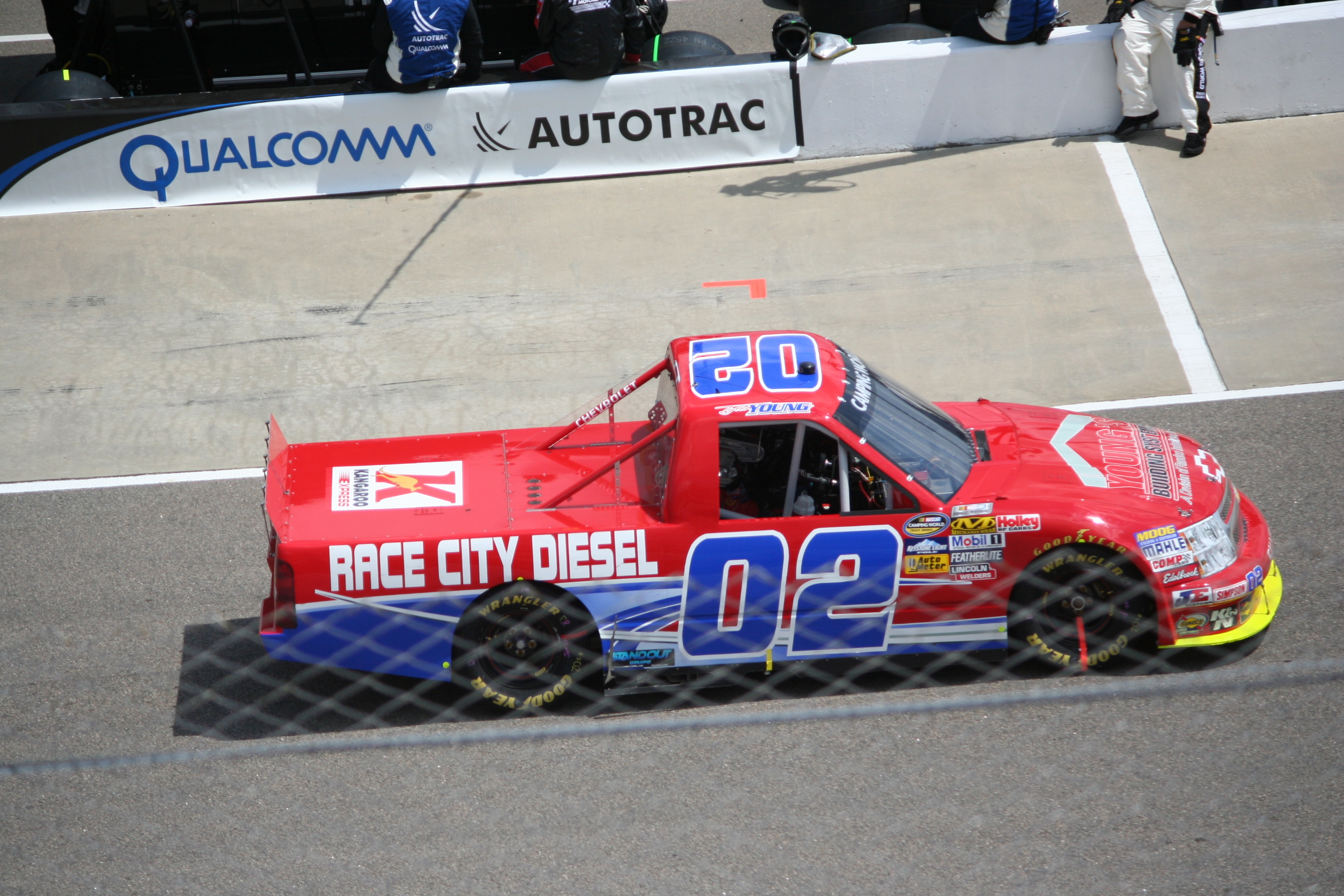
Young's truck at Rockingham Speedway in 2012

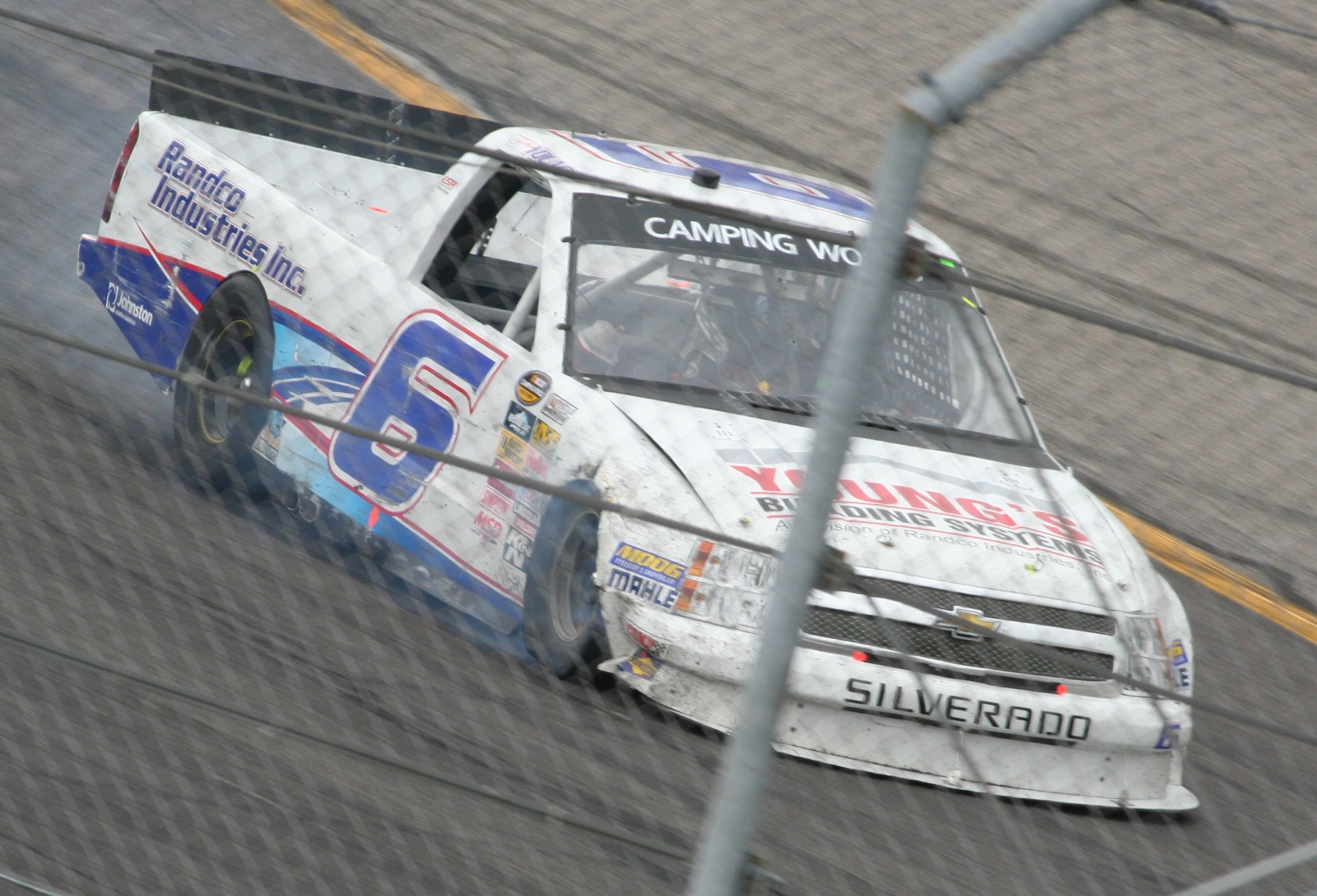
Young's truck at Rockingham in 2013

In 2012, Young and family-owned Young's Motorsports made their debuts in the Camping World Truck Series at Rockingham Speedway with the No. 02 Chevrolet Silverado. After starting 26th, he finished 28th. He made three more starts in the season, with a best finish of twentieth at Bristol Motor Speedway. The following year, he made seven starts, with a best finish of nineteenth at Texas Motor Speedway.

In 2014, Young ran the full Truck schedule for Young's. He recorded a best finish of eleventh at Chicagoland Speedway. The following year, he recorded his first career top-ten at Dover International Speedway, followed by another tenth-place finish at Talladega Superspeedway.

In 2015, Young collected two top-tens and finished thirteenth in the standings.

In 2016, Young ran fourteen races and finished nineteenth in the standings.

=== Xfinity Series ===
On July 10, 2015, Young made his Xfinity Series debut at Kentucky Speedway, driving the No. 90 Chevrolet Camaro for SS-Green Light Racing. Qualifying was rained out, forcing him to start 31st, and he battled a loose car to finish 28th.

== Motorsports career results ==
=== NASCAR ===
(key) (Bold – Pole position awarded by qualifying time. Italics – Pole position earned by points standings or practice time. * – Most laps led.)

==== Xfinity Series ====
NASCAR Xfinity Series results
Year	Team	No.	Make	1	2	3	4	5	6	7	8	9	10	11	12	13	14	15	16	17	18	19	20	21	22	23	24	25	26	27	28	29	30	31	32	33	NXSC	Pts	Ref
2015	SS-Green Light Racing	90	Chevy	DAY	ATL	LVS	PHO	CAL	TEX	BRI	RCH	TAL	IOW	CLT	DOV	MCH	CHI	DAY	KEN; 28	NHA	IND	IOW	GLN	MOH	BRI	ROA	DAR	RCH	CHI	KEN	DOV	CLT	KAN	TEX	PHO	HOM	108th	0^{1}	
2016	TriStar Motorsports	10	Toyota	DAY	ATL	LVS	PHO	CAL	TEX	BRI	RCH	TAL	DOV	CLT	POC	MCH	IOW; 39	DAY	KEN	NHA	IND	IOW	GLN	MOH	BRI	ROA	DAR	RCH	CHI	KEN	DOV	CLT	KAN	TEX	PHO	HOM	125th	0^{1}	

^{1} Ineligible for series points

==== Camping World Truck Series ====
NASCAR Camping World Truck Series results
Year	Team	No.	Make	1	2	3	4	5	6	7	8	9	10	11	12	13	14	15	16	17	18	19	20	21	22	23	NCWTC	Pts	Ref
2012	Young's Motorsports	02	Chevy	DAY	MAR	CAR; 28	KAN	CLT	DOV	TEX	KEN; 23	IOW	CHI	POC	MCH	BRI; 20	ATL	IOW	KEN	LVS	TAL	MAR; 30	TEX	PHO	HOM		45th	75	
2013	Young's Motorsports	6	Chevy	DAY	MAR	CAR; 24	KAN																				32nd	139	
2013	Young's Motorsports	02	Chevy					CLT; 29	DOV	TEX; 19	KEN	IOW; 27	ELD	POC	MCH	BRI; 24	MSP	IOW	CHI; 22	LVS	TAL	MAR	TEX; 24	PHO	HOM		32nd	139	
2014	Young's Motorsports	02	Chevy	DAY; 34	MAR; 31	KAN; 23	CLT; 28	DOV; 17	TEX; 15	GTW; 17	KEN; 20	IOW; 17	ELD; 15	POC; 26	MCH; 14	BRI; 18	MSP; 18	CHI; 11	NHA; 24	LVS; 19	TAL; 17	MAR; 19	TEX; 14	PHO; 18	HOM; 24		13th	526	
2015	Young's Motorsports	02	Chevy	DAY; 13	ATL; 22	MAR; 20	KAN; 23	CLT; 18	DOV; 10	TEX; 14	GTW; 15	IOW; 20	KEN; 26	ELD; 13	POC; 15	MCH; 15	BRI; 17	MSP; 17	CHI; 15	NHA; 16	LVS; 17	TAL; 10	MAR; 13	TEX; 23	PHO; 13	HOM; 19	13th	629	
2016	Young's Motorsports	02	Chevy	DAY; 6	ATL; 13	MAR; 13	KAN; 11	DOV; 21	CLT; 19	TEX; 21	IOW	GTW; 13	KEN	ELD; 20	POC	BRI	MCH; 10	MSP; 28	CHI; 16	NHA	LVS; 23	TAL	MAR	TEX; 26	PHO	HOM	19th	222	
2017	Young's Motorsports	02	Chevy	DAY; 23	ATL	MAR	KAN; 14	CLT	DOV	TEX; 23	GTW					MCH; 14	BRI	MSP	CHI; 13	NHA	LVS	TAL; 10	MAR				30th	152	
2017	Young's Motorsports	20	Chevy									IOW; 30	KEN	ELD	POC									TEX; 17	PHO	HOM	30th	152	
2018	Young's Motorsports	20	Chevy	DAY	ATL	LVS	MAR	DOV	KAN	CLT	TEX; 7	IOW	GTW	CHI	KEN	ELD	POC	MCH	BRI	MSP	LVS	TAL	MAR				47th	45	
2018	Young's Motorsports	12	Chevy																					TEX; 27	PHO	HOM	47th	45	
