= Justin Jennings (racing driver) =

American racing driver (born 1992)

- Born: October 29, 1992 (age 34); La Grange, Missouri, U.S.
- Height: 5 ft 11 in (1.80 m)
- Weight: 175 lb (79 kg)

NASCAR O'Reilly Auto Parts Series career
- 2 races run over 1 year
- Best finish: 136th (2012)
- First race: 2012 U.S. Cellular 250 (Iowa)
- Last race: 2012 OneMain Financial 200 (Dover)
Wins	Top tens	Poles
0	0	0

NASCAR FedEx Freight Truck Series career
- 46 races run over 4 years
- 2015 position: 26th
- Best finish: 20th (2014)
- First race: 2012 American Ethanol 200 (Iowa)
- Last race: 2015 WinStar World Casino & Resort 350 (Texas)
Wins	Top tens	Poles
0	0	0
- Statistics up to date as of November 6, 2015.

Justin Jennings (born October 29, 1992) is an American professional stock car racing driver. He last drove the No. 63 and 36 Chevrolet Silverados for MB Motorsports in the NASCAR Camping World Truck Series. Previously, he competed in the Nationwide Series and the ARCA Racing Series.

== Racing career ==
Jennings started his career in go-karts in 2002, and seven years later, joined the ASA Late Model Series. In 2010, Jennings ran both the ASA Late Model Series and the IMCA Dirt Late Model Series. In 2011, Jennings made his ARCA debut in the No. 28 LG SEEDS Chevrolet Impala for Hixson Motorsports in the Prairie Meadows 200 at Iowa Speedway. Jennings started 28th and finished 19th, 12 laps down.

Jennings made his NASCAR debut at Iowa in the 2012 American Ethanol 200 for MB Motorsports in the Camping World Truck Series with Mike Mittler as crew chief, finishing 31st. Jennings also ran the second American Ethanol 200 fall race, also at Iowa, finishing 20th. Jennings also ran in the Nationwide Series that year, in the U.S. Cellular 250 and OneMain Financial 200, finishing 26th and 32nd, respectively. Returning to MB Motorsports and the Truck Series in 2013, Jennings made his debut on an intermediate track at Kansas Speedway, starting 27th (after qualifying with a lap speed of 171.619 miles per hour (276.194 km/h)) and finishing 18th. Jennings also ran the inaugural Mudsummer Classic at Eldora Speedway, finishing sixth in heat race #5, and was relegated to the last chance qualifier. In the LCQ, Jennings finished fourth, and made the feature, starting in 29th. In the feature, Jennings finished 23rd, two laps behind race winner Austin Dillon.

== Personal life ==
Jennings is a graduate of NASCAR Technical Institute, and currently lives in Moscow Mills, Missouri.

== Motorsports career results ==
=== NASCAR ===
(key) (Bold – Pole position awarded by time. Italics – Pole position earned by points standings. * – Most laps led.)

==== Nationwide Series ====
NASCAR Nationwide Series results
Year	Team	No.	Make	1	2	3	4	5	6	7	8	9	10	11	12	13	14	15	16	17	18	19	20	21	22	23	24	25	26	27	28	29	30	31	32	33	NNSC	Pts	Ref
2012	Jimmy Means Racing	52	Chevy	DAY	PHO	LVS	BRI	CAL	TEX	RCH	TAL	DAR	IOW	CLT	DOV	MCH	ROA	KEN	DAY	NHA	CHI	IND	IOW; 26	GLN	CGV	BRI	ATL	RCH	CHI	KEN	DOV; 32	CLT	KAN	TEX	PHO	HOM	136th	0^{1}	

==== Camping World Truck Series ====
NASCAR Camping World Truck Series results
Year	Team	No.	Make	1	2	3	4	5	6	7	8	9	10	11	12	13	14	15	16	17	18	19	20	21	22	23	NCWTC	Pts	Ref
2012	MB Motorsports	65	Ford	DAY	MAR	CAR	KAN	CLT	DOV	TEX	KEN	IOW; 23	CHI	POC	MCH	BRI	ATL	IOW; 20	KEN	LVS	TAL	MAR	TEX	PHO	HOM		52nd	45	
2013	MB Motorsports	63	Chevy	DAY	MAR	CAR	KAN; 18	CLT	DOV	TEX; 24	KEN; 30							IOW; 23	CHI; 30	LVS	TAL	MAR	TEX; 19	PHO	HOM		29th	157	
2013	MB Motorsports	63	Ford									IOW; 28	ELD; 23	POC	MCH	BRI	MSP										29th	157	
2014	MB Motorsports	63	Chevy	DAY; 16	MAR; 25	KAN; 16	CLT; 29	DOV; 19	TEX; 26	GTW; 32	KEN; 18	IOW; 15	ELD	POC; 32	MCH; 23	BRI; 16		CHI; 22		LVS; 21		MAR; 35	TEX; 23	PHO; 34	HOM; 22		20th	410	
2014	MB Motorsports	36	Chevy														MSP; 26		NHA; 29		TAL; 35						20th	410	
2015	MB Motorsports	63	Chevy	DAY; DNQ	ATL	MAR			DOV; 28				KEN; 22	ELD			BRI; 20		CHI; 19					TEX; 25	PHO	HOM	26th	237	
2015	MB Motorsports	36	Chevy				KAN; 27	CLT; 30		TEX; 26	GTW; 29	IOW; 31			POC; 31	MCH; 32		MSP; 29		NHA; 32	LVS; 29	TAL	MAR				26th	237	

^{*} Season still in progress
^{1} Ineligible for series points

=== ARCA Racing Series ===
(key) (Bold – Pole position awarded by qualifying time. Italics – Pole position earned by points standings or practice time. * – Most laps led.)

ARCA Racing Series results
Year	Team	No.	Make	1	2	3	4	5	6	7	8	9	10	11	12	13	14	15	16	17	18	19	ARSC	Pts	Ref
2011	Hixson Motorsports	28	Chevy	DAY	TAL	SLM	TOL	NJE	CHI	POC	MCH	WIN	BLN	IOW; 19	IRP	POC	ISF	MAD	DSF	SLM	KAN	TOL	125th	135	
