= MB Motorsports =

American auto race team

- Owner: Mike Mittler
- Base: Foristell, Missouri
- Series: Camping World Truck Series
- Manufacturer: Chevrolet
- Opened: 1995
- Closed: 2018

Career
- Debut: 1995 Sears Auto Center 125 (Milwaukee)
- Latest race: 2018 Lucas Oil 150 (Phoenix)
- Races competed: 235
- Drivers' Championships: 0
- Race victories: 0
- Pole positions: 1

MB Motorsports was an American professional stock car racing team that competed in the NASCAR Camping World Truck Series. The team was based in Foristell, Missouri, and was owned by Mike Mittler until his death in 2019. The team was one of few to field entries every year since the Series' inception in 1995 until 2018. The team formed partnerships with Young's Motorsports, Norm Benning Racing and Copp Motorsports at various points in its history.

== History ==
MB Motorsports debuted at the 1995 Sears Auto Center 125 at The Milwaukee Mile. Tony Roper drove the No. 26 Mittler Brothers Machine & Tool F-150 to a 22nd-place finish. He made another start weeks later at Martinsville Speedway, but finished 27th after suffering rear end problems. Mike Wallace drove the next race at North Wilkesboro Speedway, but finished 29th after an engine failure. The team only made two starts in 1996. Kenny Irwin Jr. drove the first race, and started and finished 32nd. The next race came at Flemington Speedway, where Michael Dokken exited the race after seven laps due to electrical problems.

In 1997, the team made a total of three races, with the first one coming at I-70 Speedway with Rick Beebe qualifying ninth but finishing 24th. Jerry Robertson made an additional two starts with Mainstream Technology/Lucas Oil sponsorship, his best finish being 26th. Doug George began the 1998 season with MB, but a failure to finish higher than 30th and three consecutive DNQs forced him out of the ride. The team switched to a part-time schedule for the rest of the season, with Randy MacDonald, Beebe, and Bryan Reffner driving. Randy Nelson ran the 1999 season-opener, but only completed fifteen laps. Robertson returned to run three races in the MB truck, but only finished one race. Jamie McMurray ran five races for the team, and had a best finish of eleventh at Las Vegas Motor Speedway.

McMurray was selected to make a full-time run for Rookie of the Year in 2000, but left midway through the season for TKO Motorsports. Tony Roper returned to the team and drove the rest of the season. During the O'Reilly 400K at Texas Motor Speedway on October 13, Roper crashed heavily on lap 33, and suffered a neck injury that would prove fatal the next day. Roper was one of four NASCAR drivers, including Adam Petty, former MB Motorsports driver Kenny Irwin, and seven-time Cup Series Champion Dale Earnhardt to be killed on track in less than nine months.

MB returned to the track in 2001, switching to the No. 63. Rookie Larry Gunselman joined the team, bringing sponsorship from Waterloo Tool Storage, and occasionally running Chevrolets. He ran seventeen races and had a best finish of sixteenth at Kansas Speedway. Mike Harmon also drove one race at Dover International Speedway, but finished thirty-fifth after an early ignition failure. Gunselman drove three early races for MB in 2002, but the team stopped running for a few races until Carl Edwards was hired to run seven races. He recorded the first top-ten finish in team history at Kansas. Regan Smith drove two races late in the season, but failed to finish a race. In 2003, Ronnie Hornaday drove two races with Summer Bay Resort sponsoring, but suffered engine failures in both races. David Stover drove the rest of the team's schedule and had two top-twenty finishes.

In 2004, rookie driver Chris Wimmer drove ten races with Porter Truck Sales sponsorshing, and had a best finish of eighteenth. Justin Allgaier competed in four races the following season, but only had a best finish of 26th, and failed to qualify for five races. After several DNQs in 2006 with J. R. Patton, Allgaier returned the next season for three races, with a best finish of twenty-first. Cameron Dodson then took over for four races and had a best finish of 24th. Scott Lynch drove one race, and Brad Keselowski drove in two races under a partnership with K Automotive Racing. Jason White drove the season-opening race in 2007 with GunBroker.com sponsoring, but the race ended in a crash. For the rest of the season, Scott Lynch and Jack Smith shared the ride with Cooper Bussman sponsoring. The team also fielded a second truck in the first time in its history at Gateway International Raceway. Smith drove but qualified and finished last, failing to complete a lap.

In 2008, Diversified Partners sponsored the season-opening race with P. J. Jones driving, but he wrecked early. Jones and Smith drove two races a piece, with Allgaier returning with a 24th-place finish at Kentucky Speedway. The team also fielded a second truck, the No. 36 at Texas Motor Speedway. J. C. Stout finished 34th after an early vibration put him out of contention.

In 2009, Mittler fielded the No. 63 again, this time for Tim Andrews at Chicago and Texas, where he finished 25th both times, and for Ben Stancil at Kansas, Kentucky, and Charlotte, with a best finish of 19th.

For 2010, young driver Nick Hoffman made his Truck Series debut at IRP finishing 23rd. Jack Smith ran at Kansas, Texas, and Gateway, impressing with all top-25 finishes. Hoffman and Smith would return to MB the following year, with Hoffman running at Nashville and Kansas but only scored a best finish of 25th. Smith's return to MB brought sponsorship from Seal Wrap, as well as consulting from Paul Andrews. Making six starts that season, Smith would get a career best finish of 11th at Atlanta. However, Smith was suspended by NASCAR for failing a drug test. Young driver Tyler Tanner, who brought sponsorship from EF-65, made his debut at Martinsville.

The team stuck to the trio of Hoffman (two races), Smith (six races), and Tanner (one race) for a part-time effort in 2011. Smith recorded the best finish, an eleventh, but was indefinitely suspended by NASCAR at the end of the season for violating its substance abuse policy, ending any partnership between the team and Smith.

Switching to truck number 65 in 2012, only five races were run, two apiece with Justin Jennings and Scott Stenzel and one with Chris Lafferty.

Jennings returned to the team and No. 63 in 2013, with Stenzel again returning for one.

MB went full-time in 2014, the first season since its inception that a full-time effort was made. However, a partnership with Young's Motorsports, then in its infancy, was needed to make it through the season. Jennings ran a large portion of the schedule, but Stenzel and Blake Koch also drove Mittler trucks during the season.

In 2015, 16-year-old Jake Griffin from Quincy, Illinois, was hired to drive for the team. Griffin, the youngest driver to win a NASCAR-sanctioned event after winning a race at age 14, made his debut with the team at Martinsville. At Eldora Speedway, dirt racer Bobby Pierce won the pole in his first attempt. He then finished 2nd after contending for the lead the entire race, despite running an old 2013 Chevy body. Justin Jennings and Tyler Tanner ran the majority of the schedule for the team, which fielded two entries; a full-race 63 and a start-and-park 36. Bobby Gerhart drove the No. 36 at Talladega and finished 12th.

The team shuttered the 36 as entry counts rose in 2016. The No. 36 only starts were at Daytona and Talladega with Bobby Gerhart. The team (No. 63) rotated through a number of drivers, some veteran, some developmental. Pierce started 1st although he didn't win the pole at Eldora but contact during the race resulted in a 25th-place finish. Midway through the season, the team made a deal with Norm Benning Racing to have Benning field his own trucks with MB's owner points in select events.

Bobby Gerhart now drove the No. 63 at Daytona in 2017. The team developed a partnership with Copp Motorsports fielding No. 36, No. 63 and No. 83, similar to the one with NBR the previous season. The team has recently start and parked with various drivers. Landon Huffman drove the No. 83 (usually Copp's number) for the team at Martinsville (fall).

Kevin and Kyle Donahue also drove for MB Motorsports with 6 starts between the two. The brothers made history in 2016 being the first in NASCAR to both debut in the same race. Kevin and Kyle have made starts in the 63 and the 36 truck.

On May 10, 2019, Mittler died from with cancer at age 67. Various tributes to Mittler were made during the 2019 season: for the Truck Series' 2019 North Carolina Education Lottery 200 at Charlotte Motor Speedway, the trucks carried a special decal, while the Mike Mittler Memorial Trophy was presented to the winner of the CarShield 200 at World Wide Technology Raceway at Gateway. NASCAR Xfinity Series driver Garrett Smithley drove a paint scheme honoring Mittler in the Sport Clips Haircuts VFW 200 at Darlington Raceway.

=== Truck No. 26/63 results (primary truck) ===
| Year | Driver | No. | Make | 1 | 2 | 3 | 4 | 5 | 6 | 7 | 8 | 9 | 10 | 11 | 12 | 13 | 14 | 15 | 16 | 17 | 18 | 19 | 20 | 21 | 22 | 23 | 24 | 25 | 26 | 27 | NCWTC | Pts |
|---|---|---|---|---|---|---|---|---|---|---|---|---|---|---|---|---|---|---|---|---|---|---|---|---|---|---|---|---|---|---|---|---|
| 1995 | Tony Roper | 26 | Ford | PHO | TUS | SGS | MMR | POR | EVG | I70 | LVL | BRI | MLW; 22 | CNS | HPT | | | RCH; DNQ | MAR; 27 | | | | | | | | | | | | | |
| 1995 | Andy Brass | 26 | Ford | | | | | | | | | | | | | IRP; 23 | FLM | | | | | | | | | | | | | | | |
| 1995 | Mike Wallace | 26 | Ford | | | | | | | | | | | | | | | | | NWS; 29 | SON | MMR | PHO | | | | | | | | | |
| 1996 | Kenny Irwin Jr. | 26 | Ford | HOM | PHO; 32 | POR | EVG | TUS | CNS | HPT | BRI | NZH | | | | | | | | | | | | | | | | | | | | |
| 1996 | Randy Porter | 26 | Ford | | | | | | | | | | MLW; 22 | LVL | | | | | | | | | | | | | | | | | | |
| 1996 | Rick Beebe | 26 | Ford | | | | | | | | | | | | I70; 22 | IRP; DNQ | | | | | | | | | | | | | | | | |
| 1996 | Michael Dokken | 26 | Ford | | | | | | | | | | | | | | FLM; 30 | GLN | NSV | RCH | NHA | MAR | NWS | SON | MMR | PHO | | | | | | |
| 1996 | Ken Bouchard | 26 | Ford | | | | | | | | | | | | | | | | | | | | | | | | LVS; DNQ | | | | | |
| 1997 | Andy Belmont | 26 | Ford | WDW; DNQ | TUS; DNQ | HOM | PHO; DNQ | POR | EVG | | | | | | | | | | | | | | | | | | | | | | 53rd | 387 |
| 1997 | Rick Beebe | 26 | Ford | | | | | | | I70; 24 | NHA | TEX | BRI | NZH | | | | | | | | | | | | | | | | | 53rd | 387 |
| 1997 | Jerry Robertson | 26 | Ford | | | | | | | | | | | | MLW; 26 | LVL | CNS; 30 | HPT | IRP; DNQ | FLM | NSV | | | MAR; DNQ | SON | MMR | CAL | PHO | | | 53rd | 387 |
| 1997 | Doug George | 26 | Ford | | | | | | | | | | | | | | | | | | | GLN; DNQ | RCH | | | | | | | | 53rd | 387 |
| 1997 | Perry Tripp | 26 | Ford | | | | | | | | | | | | | | | | | | | | | | | | | | LVS; DNQ | | 53rd | 387 |
| 1998 | Billy Bigley Jr. | 26 | Ford | WDW; DNQ | | | | | | | | | | | | | | | | | | | | | | | | | | | 31st | 1177 |
| 1998 | Doug George | 26 | Ford | | HOM; 33 | PHO; 30 | POR; 30 | EVG; 32 | I70; DNQ | GLN; DNQ | | | | | | | | | | | | | | | | | | | | | 31st | 1177 |
| 1998 | Randy MacDonald | 26 | Ford | | | | | | | | TEX; 32 | BRI | MLW; 28 | NZH | CAL | PPR | IRP; 23 | NHA | FLM | NSV | HPT; 26 | | | | GTY; 20 | MAR | SON | MMR | PHO | | 31st | 1177 |
| 1998 | Bryan Reffner | 26 | Ford | | | | | | | | | | | | | | | | | | | LVL; 15 | RCH; 35 | MEM; 28 | | | | | | | 31st | 1177 |
| 1998 | Rick Beebe | 26 | Ford | | | | | | | | | | | | | | | | | | | | | | | | | | | LVS; 26 | 31st | 1177 |
| 1999 | Randy Nelson | 26 | Ford | HOM; 30 | PHO | EVG | MMR | MAR | MEM | PPR | | | | | | | | | | | | | | | | | | | | | 33rd | 777 |
| 1999 | Jamie McMurray | 26 | Ford | | | | | | | | I70; 24 | BRI | | | | | | | | | IRP; 24 | GTY; 30 | HPT | RCH | LVS; 11 | LVL | TEX; 28 | CAL | | | 33rd | 777 |
| 1999 | Jerry Robertson | 26 | Ford | | | | | | | | | | TEX; 25 | PIR | GLN | MLW; 25 | NSV; 33 | NZH | MCH | NHA | | | | | | | | | | | 33rd | 777 |
| 2000 | Jamie McMurray | 26 | Ford | DAY; 20 | HOM; 22 | PHO; 33 | MMR; 30 | MAR | PIR | GTY; 23 | MEM; 20 | PPR; 32 | EVG | TEX; 14 | KEN; 17 | GLN | MLW; 31 | NHA | NZH | MCH | | | | | | | | | | | 31st | 1260 |
| 2000 | Tony Roper | 26 | Ford | | | | | | | | | | | | | | | | | | IRP; 30 | NSV; 34 | CIC | RCH; 21 | DOV; DNQ | TEX; 29 | CAL | | | | 31st | 1260 |
| 2001 | Larry Gunselman | 63 | Ford | DAY; 18 | HOM; 36 | MMR; 26 | MAR; 17 | GTY; 23 | | | | | | MLW; 19 | KAN; 16 | KEN; 22 | NHA; 31 | IRP; 31 | NSH | CIC; 24 | | | | TEX; 35 | LVS; 33 | PHO | CAL; 29 | | | | 26th | 1446 |
| 2001 | Larry Gunselman | 63 | Chevy | | | | | | DAR; 36 | PPR; 32 | | | | | | | | | | | NZH; 33 | RCH | SBO | | | | | | | | 26th | 1446 |
| 2001 | Mike Harmon | 63 | Chevy | | | | | | | | DOV; 35 | TEX | MEM | | | | | | | | | | | | | | | | | | 26th | 1446 |
| 2002 | Larry Gunselman | 63 | Ford | DAY; 31 | DAR; 32 | MAR | GTY; 30 | PPR | DOV | TEX | | | | | | | | | | | | | | | | | | | | | 30th | 1035 |
| 2002 | Carl Edwards | 63 | Ford | | | | | | | | MEM; 23 | MLW; 28 | KAN; 8 | KEN; 18 | NHA | MCH | IRP; 19 | NSH | RCH | TEX; 24 | | LVS; 36 | CAL | | | | | | | | 30th | 1035 |
| 2002 | Regan Smith | 63 | Ford | | | | | | | | | | | | | | | | | | SBO; 29 | | | PHO; 30 | HOM | | | | | | 30th | 1035 |
| 2003 | Ronnie Hornaday | 63 | Ford | DAY; 27 | DAR | MMR | MAR | CLT; 32 | DOV | TEX | | | | | | | | | | | | | | | | | | | | | 36th | 775 |
| 2003 | David Stover | 63 | Ford | | | | | | | | MEM; 25 | MLW; 18 | KAN; 27 | KEN | GTW; 26 | MCH | IRP; 35 | NSH | BRI; 17 | RCH | NHA | CAL | LVS; DNQ | SBO | TEX; 30 | MAR | PHO | HOM | | | 36th | 775 |
| 2004 | Chris Wimmer | 63 | Ford | DAY | ATL | MAR; DNQ | MFD; 36 | CLT | DOV | TEX | MEM; 36 | MLW; 20 | KAN; 18 | KEN; 21 | GTW; 24 | MCH | IRP; DNQ | NSH; 33 | BRI; 25 | RCH; 36 | NHA | LVS; DNQ | CAL; 29 | TEX; 27 | MAR | PHO; 33 | DAR | | | | 35th | 1095 |
| 2004 | Brad Keselowski | 63 | Ford | | | | | | | | | | | | | | | | | | | | | | | | | HOM; DNQ | | | 35th | 1095 |
| 2005 | J. R. Patton | 63 | Ford | DAY; DNQ | CAL | ATL | | | | | | | | | | | | | | | | | | | | | | | | | 41st | 589 |
| 2005 | Justin Allgaier | 63 | Ford | | | | MAR; DNQ | GTY; DNQ | MFD | CLT | DOV | TEX | MCH | MLW; 26 | KAN; 36 | KEN; DNQ | MEM; DNQ | IRP | NSH | BRI | RCH | NHA | LVS; 27 | MAR | ATL | TEX; 27 | PHO | HOM; DNQ | | | 41st | 589 |
| 2006 | J. R. Patton | 63 | Ford | DAY; DNQ | CAL | ATL | | GTY; DNQ | CLT; DNQ | MFD | DOV | TEX; DNQ | MCH | | | | | | | | | | | | | | | | | | 37th | 1017 |
| 2006 | Justin Martz | 63 | Ford | | | | MAR; DNQ | | | | | | | | | | | | | | | | | | | | | | | | 37th | 1017 |
| 2006 | Justin Allgaier | 63 | Ford | | | | | | | | | | | MLW; 22 | KAN; 21 | KEN; 36 | MEM | | | | | | | | | | | | | | 37th | 1017 |
| 2006 | Cameron Dodson | 63 | Ford | | | | | | | | | | | | | | | IRP; 29 | NSH | | NHA; 24 | | | MAR; 30 | ATL | TEX | PHO; 30 | | | | 37th | 1017 |
| 2006 | Brad Keselowski | 63 | Ford | | | | | | | | | | | | | | | | | BRI; 34 | | | | | | | | HOM; 24 | | | 37th | 1017 |
| 2006 | Scott Lynch | 63 | Ford | | | | | | | | | | | | | | | | | | | LVS; 35 | TAL | | | | | | | | 37th | 1017 |
| 2007 | Jason White | 63 | Ford | DAY; 35 | CAL | ATL | MAR | | | | | | | | | | | | | | | | | | | | | | | | 34th | 793 |
| 2007 | Scott Lynch | 63 | Ford | | | | | KAN; 20 | CLT | | DOV; 27 | TEX | MCH | | | | IRP; 31 | NSH | BRI | GTW; 26 | NHA | LVS | TAL | MAR | ATL; 33 | TEX; 28 | PHO | | | | 34th | 793 |
| 2007 | Scott Lynch | 63 | Dodge | | | | | | | | | | | | | | | | | | | | | | | | | HOM; DNQ | | | 34th | 793 |
| 2007 | Jack Smith | 63 | Ford | | | | | | | MFD; 27 | | | | MLW; 25 | MEM | KEN; 27 | | | | | | | | | | | | | | | 34th | 793 |
| 2008 | P. J. Jones | 63 | Ford | DAY; 35 | CAL | ATL | MAR | | | | | | | | | | | | | | | | | | | | | | | | 35th | 609 |
| 2008 | P. J. Jones | 63 | Chevy | | | | | | | | | TEX; 23 | MCH | MLW | MEM | | | | | | | | | | | | | | | | 35th | 609 |
| 2008 | Jack Smith | 63 | Ford | | | | | KAN; 22 | CLT | MFD; 32 | DOV | | | | | | | | | GTW; 22 | NHA | LVS | TAL | MAR | ATL | TEX; 21 | PHO | HOM | | | 35th | 609 |
| 2008 | Justin Allgaier | 63 | Ford | | | | | | | | | | | | | KEN; 24 | IRP | NSH | BRI | | | | | | | | | | | | 35th | 609 |
| 2009 | Ben Stancill | 63 | Ford | DAY | CAL | ATL | MAR | KAN; 25 | CLT; 19 | DOV | TEX | MCH | MLW | MEM | KEN; 35 | IRP | NSH | BRI | | | GTW; DNQ | NHA | LVS | MAR | TAL | TEX | PHO | HOM | | | 47th | 386 |
| 2009 | Tim Andrews | 63 | Ford | | | | | | | | | | | | | | | | CHI; 25 | IOW | | | | | | | | | | | 47th | 386 |
| 2010 | Jack Smith | 63 | Ford | DAY | ATL | MAR | NSH | KAN; 14 | DOV | CLT | TEX; 15 | MCH | IOW | GTW; 23 | | | | | | | | | | | | | | | | | 45th | 432 |
| 2010 | Nick Hoffman | 63 | Ford | | | | | | | | | | | | IRP; 23 | POC | NSH | DAR | BRI | CHI | KEN | NHA | LVS | MAR | TAL | TEX | PHO | HOM | | | 45th | 432 |
| 2011 | Nick Hoffman | 63 | Ford | DAY | PHO | DAR | MAR | NSH; 34 | DOV | CLT | KAN; 25 | TEX | | | | | | | | | | | | | | | | | | | 37th | 143 |
| 2011 | Jack Smith | 63 | Ford | | | | | | | | | | KEN; 18 | IOW; 29 | NSH | IRP; 28 | POC | MCH | BRI | ATL; 11 | CHI; 23 | NHA | KEN | LVS | TAL | MAR | TEX; 26 | HOM | | | 37th | 143 |
| 2012 | Caleb Roark | 63 | Ford | DAY; DNQ | | | | | | | | | | | | | | | | | | | | | | | | | | | 40th | 106 |
| 2012 | Tyler Tanner | 65 | Ford | | MAR; DNQ | CAR | | | | | | | | | | | | | | | | | | | | | | | | | 40th | 106 |
| 2012 | Scott Stenzel | 65 | Chevy | | | | KAN; 24 | CLT | DOV | TEX; 24 | KEN | | | | | | | | | | | | | | | | | | | | 40th | 106 |
| 2012 | Justin Jennings | 65 | Ford | | | | | | | | | IOW; 23 | | | | | | IOW; 20 | KEN | | | | | | | | | | | | 40th | 106 |
| 2012 | Chris Lafferty | 65 | Chevy | | | | | | | | | | CHI; DNQ | POC | MCH | BRI | ATL | | | LVS; 24 | TAL | MAR | TEX | PHO | HOM | | | | | | 40th | 106 |
| 2013 | Scott Stenzel | 63 | Ford | DAY; DNQ | MAR | CAR | | | | | | | | | | | | | | | TAL; 25 | MAR | | | | | | | | | 35th | 176 |
| 2013 | Justin Jennings | 63 | Chevy | | | | KAN; 18 | CLT | DOV | TEX; 24 | KEN; 30 | | | | | | | IOW; 23 | CHI; 30 | LVS | | | TEX; 19 | PHO | HOM | | | | | | 35th | 176 |
| 2013 | Justin Jennings | 63 | Ford | | | | | | | | | IOW; 28 | ELD; 23 | POC | MCH | BRI | MSP | | | | | | | | | | | | | | 35th | 176 |
| 2014 | Justin Jennings | 63 | Chevy | DAY; 16 | MAR; 25 | KAN; 16 | CLT; 29 | DOV; 19 | TEX; 26 | GTW; 32 | KEN; 18 | IOW; 15 | | POC; 32 | MCH; 23 | BRI; 16 | | CHI; 22 | | LVS; 21 | | MAR; 35 | TEX; 23 | PHO; 34 | HOM; 22 | | | | | | 21st | 457 |
| 2014 | J. R. Heffner | 63 | Chevy | | | | | | | | | | ELD; 18 | | | | | | NHA; 23 | | | | | | | | | | | | 21st | 457 |
| 2014 | Scott Stenzel | 63 | Chevy | | | | | | | | | | | | | | MSP; 24 | | | | TAL; 22 | | | | | | | | | | 21st | 457 |
| 2015 | Justin Jennings | 63 | Chevy | DAY; DNQ | | | | | DOV; 28 | | | | KEN; 22 | | | | BRI; 20 | | CHI; 19 | | | | | TEX; 25 | | | | | | | 20th | 513 |
| 2015 | Garrett Smithley | 63 | Chevy | | ATL; 18 | | | | | | | | | | POC; 16 | MCH; 14 | | | | | | | | | | HOM; 28 | | | | | 20th | 513 |
| 2015 | Jake Griffin | 63 | Chevy | | | MAR; 26 | | | | | | IOW; 27 | | | | | | | | | | | | | | | | | | | 20th | 513 |
| 2015 | Tyler Tanner | 63 | Chevy | | | | KAN; 15 | CLT; 21 | | TEX; 17 | GTW; 16 | | | | | | | | | | | TAL; 26 | | | | | | | | | 20th | 513 |
| 2015 | Bobby Pierce | 63 | Chevy | | | | | | | | | | | ELD; 2 | | | | | | | | | MAR; 22 | | | | | | | | 20th | 513 |
| 2015 | Daniel Brown | 63 | Chevy | | | | | | | | | | | | | | | MSP; 27 | | | | | | | | | | | | | 20th | 513 |
| 2015 | Akinori Ogata | 63 | Chevy | | | | | | | | | | | | | | | | | NHA; 18 | LVS; 23 | | | | PHO; 27 | | | | | | 20th | 513 |
| 2016 | Reed Sorenson | 63 | Chevy | DAY; DNQ | | | | | | | | | | | | | | | | | | | | | | | | | | | 32nd | 130 |
| 2016 | Garrett Smithley | 63 | Chevy | | ATL; 18 | | | | | | | | | | | | | | | | | | | | | | | | | | 32nd | 130 |
| 2016 | Spencer Boyd | 63 | Ram | | | MAR; 28 | | | | | | | | | | | | | | | | | | | | | | | | | 32nd | 130 |
| 2016 | Bobby Pierce | 63 | Chevy | | | | KAN; 23 | DOV; 26 | CLT; 27 | | | | | ELD; 25* | | | | | | | | | | | | | | | | | 32nd | 130 |
| 2016 | Mike Bliss | 63 | Chevy | | | | | | | TEX; 28 | | | | | | | | | | | | | | | | | | | | | 32nd | 130 |
| 2016 | Jake Griffin | 63 | Chevy | | | | | | | | IOW; 21 | GTW; 30 | | | | BRI; DNQ | | | | | | | | | | | | | | | 32nd | 130 |
| 2016 | Norm Benning | 63 | Chevy | | | | | | | | | | KEN; 28 | | POC; 23 | | MCH; 27 | MSP; 20 | | | LVS; 26 | | | TEX; 32 | PHO; 26 | HOM; DNQ | | | | | 32nd | 130 |
| 2016 | Jesse Little | 63 | Chevy | | | | | | | | | | | | | | | | CHI; 29 | | | | | | | | | | | | 32nd | 130 |
| 2016 | Akinori Ogata | 63 | Chevy | | | | | | | | | | | | | | | | | NHA; 31 | | | | | | | | | | | 32nd | 130 |
| 2016 | Ryan Ellis | 63 | Chevy | | | | | | | | | | | | | | | | | | | TAL; DNQ | | | | | | | | | 32nd | 130 |
| 2016 | Kyle Donahue | 63 | Chevy | | | | | | | | | | | | | | | | | | | | MAR; 31 | | | | | | | | 32nd | 130 |
| 2017 | Bobby Gerhart | 63 | Chevy | DAY; 21 | | | | | | | | | | | | | | | | | | TAL; 11 | | | | | | | | | 27th | 274 |
| 2017 | J. J. Yeley | 63 | Chevy | | ATL; DNQ | | | | | | | | | | | | | | | | | | | TEX; 29 | | | | | | | 27th | 274 |
| 2017 | Kyle Donahue | 63 | Chevy | | | MAR; 16 | | | | | GTW; 16 | IOW; 26 | | | | | | | | | | | | | | | | | | | 27th | 274 |
| 2017 | Kevin Donahue | 63 | Chevy | | | | KAN; 21 | | | TEX; 27 | | | | | | | | | CHI; 29 | | | | | | | | | | | | 27th | 274 |
| 2017 | Todd Peck | 63 | Chevy | | | | | CLT; 32 | | | | | | | | | | MSP; 29 | | | LVS; 29 | | | | | | | | | | 27th | 274 |
| 2017 | Camden Murphy | 63 | Chevy | | | | | | DOV; 32 | | | | KEN; 30 | | | | | | | NHA; 27 | | | | | | | | | | | 27th | 274 |
| 2017 | Bobby Pierce | 63 | Chevy | | | | | | | | | | | ELD; 6 | | | | | | | | | | | | | | | | | 27th | 274 |
| 2017 | Travis Kvapil | 63 | Chevy | | | | | | | | | | | | POC; 26 | | | | | | | | | | | | | | | | 27th | 274 |
| 2017 | B. J. McLeod | 63 | Chevy | | | | | | | | | | | | | MCH; 24 | | | | | | | | | | | | | | | 27th | 274 |
| 2017 | Landon Huffman | 63 | Chevy | | | | | | | | | | | | | | BRI; 20 | | | | | | | | | | | | | | 27th | 274 |
| 2017 | Chris Windom | 63 | Chevy | | | | | | | | | | | | | | | | | | | | MAR; 32 | | | HOM; 26 | | | | | 27th | 274 |
| 2017 | Ted Minor | 63 | Chevy | | | | | | | | | | | | | | | | | | | | | | PHO; 31 | | | | | | 27th | 274 |
| 2018 | Bobby Gerhart | 63 | Chevy | DAY; DNQ | | | | | | | | | | | | | | | | | | TAL; 23 | | | | | | | | | 32nd | 146 |
| 2018 | Akinori Ogata | 63 | Chevy | | ATL; 30 | | | | | | | | | | | | | | | | | | | | | | | | | | 32nd | 146 |
| 2018 | Scott Stenzel | 63 | Chevy | | | LVS; 32 | | | | | | | | | | | | | | | | | | | | | | | | | 32nd | 146 |
| 2018 | Kevin Donahue | 63 | Chevy | | | | MAR; 30 | | KAN; 32 | | | | GTW; 12 | | | | | | | | | | | | | | | | | | 32nd | 146 |
| 2018 | J. J. Yeley | 63 | Chevy | | | | | | | CLT; 32 | | IOW; 32 | | CHI; 29 | | | | | | | | | | | | | | | | | 32nd | 146 |
| 2018 | Kyle Donahue | 63 | Chevy | | | | | | | | TEX; 28 | | | | | | | | | | | | MAR; 22 | TEX | | | | | | | 32nd | 146 |
| 2018 | Bayley Currey | 63 | Chevy | | | | | | | | | | | | KEN; 30 | | POC; 32 | | | | | | | | | | | | | | 32nd | 146 |
| 2018 | Kyle Strickler | 63 | Chevy | | | | | | | | | | | | | ELD; 31 | | | | | | | | | | | | | | | 32nd | 146 |
| 2018 | Timmy Hill | 63 | Chevy | | | | | | | | | | | | | | | MCH; 32 | BRI | MSP | LVS | | | | | | | | | | 32nd | 146 |
| 2018 | Jesse Iwuji | 63 | Chevy | | | | | | | | | | | | | | | | | | | | | | PHO; 27 | HOM | | | | | 32nd | 146 |

=== Truck No. 36 results (secondary truck) ===
| Year | Driver | No. | Make | 1 | 2 | 3 | 4 | 5 | 6 | 7 | 8 | 9 | 10 | 11 | 12 | 13 | 14 | 15 | 16 | 17 | 18 | 19 | 20 | 21 | 22 | 23 | 24 | 25 | NCWTC | Pts |
|---|---|---|---|---|---|---|---|---|---|---|---|---|---|---|---|---|---|---|---|---|---|---|---|---|---|---|---|---|---|---|
| 2004 | Patrick Lawson | 26 | Ford | DAY | ATL | MAR | MFD | CLT | DOV | TEX | MEM | MLW | KAN | KEN | GTW | MCH | IRP; DNQ | NSH | BRI | RCH | NHA | LVS | CAL | TEX | MAR | PHO | DAR | HOM | 83rd | 16 |
| 2007 | Jack Smith | 68 | Ford | DAY | CAL | ATL | MAR | KAN | CLT | MFD | DOV | TEX | MCH | MLW | MEM | KEN | IRP | NSH | BRI | GTW; 36 | NHA | LVS | TAL | MAR | ATL | TEX | PHO | HOM | N/A | 0 |
| 2008 | J. C. Stout | 36 | Ford | DAY | CAL | ATL | MAR | KAN | CLT | MFD | DOV | TEX; 34 | MCH | MLW | MEM | KEN | IRP | NSH | BRI | GTW; 33 | NHA | LVS | TAL | MAR | ATL | TEX; 26 | PHO | HOM | 47th | 210 |
| 2009 | Jack Smith | 36 | Ford | DAY | CAL | ATL | MAR | KAN | CLT | DOV | TEX | MCH | MLW | MEM | KEN; DNQ | IRP | NSH | BRI | CHI | IOW | GTW; DNQ | NHA | LVS | MAR | TAL | | | | 58th | 186 |
| 2009 | Tim Andrews | 36 | Ford | | | | | | | | | | | | | | | | | | | | | | | TEX; 25 | PHO | HOM | 58th | 186 |
| 2011 | Tyler Tanner | 65 | Ford | DAY | PHO | DAR | MAR | NSH | DOV | CLT | KAN | TEX | KEN | IOW | NSH | IRP | POC | MCH | BRI | ATL | CHI | NHA | KEN | LVS | TAL | MAR; 30 | TEX | HOM | 68th | 14 |
| 2014 | Scott Stenzel | 36 | Chevy | DAY | MAR | KAN; 31 | CLT | | | | | | | | | | | CHI; 29 | | LVS; 28 | | | | | HOM; 33 | | | | 32nd | 153 |
| 2014 | Scott Stenzel | 36 | Ram | | | | | | | GTW; 28 | KEN | IOW | ELD | POC | MCH | | | | | | | | | | | | | | 32nd | 153 |
| 2014 | Blake Koch | 36 | Ram | | | | | DOV; 35 | TEX | | | | | | | BRI; 35 | | | | | | | | | | | | | 32nd | 153 |
| 2014 | Blake Koch | 36 | Chevy | | | | | | | | | | | | | | | | | | | | TEX; 32 | | | | | | 32nd | 153 |
| 2014 | Justin Jennings | 36 | Chevy | | | | | | | | | | | | | | MSP; 26 | | NHA; 29 | | TAL; 35 | MAR | | | | | | | 32nd | 153 |
| 2014 | Tyler Tanner | 36 | Ram | | | | | | | | | | | | | | | | | | | | | PHO; 21 | | | | | 32nd | 153 |
| 2015 | Justin Jennings | 36 | Chevy | DAY | ATL | MAR | KAN; 27 | CLT; 30 | | TEX; 26 | GTW; 29 | IOW; 31 | KEN | ELD | POC; 31 | MCH; 32 | | MSP; 29 | | NHA; 32 | LVS; 29 | | | | | | | | 30th | 241 |
| 2015 | Tyler Tanner | 36 | Chevy | | | | | | DOV; 31 | | | | | | | | BRI; 32 | | CHI; 32 | | | | | TEX; 31 | | | | | 30th | 241 |
| 2015 | Bobby Gerhart | 36 | Chevy | | | | | | | | | | | | | | | | | | | TAL; 12 | MAR | | | | | | 30th | 241 |
| 2015 | Bobby Pierce | 36 | Chevy | | | | | | | | | | | | | | | | | | | | | | PHO; 16 | HOM; DNQ | | | 30th | 241 |
| 2016 | Bobby Gerhart | 36 | Chevy | DAY; 12 | ATL | MAR | KAN | DOV | CLT | TEX | IOW | GTW | KEN | ELD | POC | BRI | MCH | MSP | CHI | NHA | LVS | TAL; 17 | MAR | TEX | PHO | HOM | | | 38th | 37 |
| 2017 | Camden Murphy | 36 | Chevy | DAY | ATL | MAR | KAN; 30 | CLT | | | | | | | POC; 28 | MCH; 25 | | | | | | | | | | HOM; 27 | | | 38th | 91 |
| 2017 | J. J. Yeley | 36 | Chevy | | | | | | DOV; 29 | TEX | | | | | | | | | | | | | | | | | | | 38th | 91 |
| 2017 | Kevin Donahue | 36 | Chevy | | | | | | | | GTW; 26 | IOW; 28 | KEN | | | | | | | | | | | | | | | | 38th | 91 |
| 2017 | Chris Windom | 36 | Chevy | | | | | | | | | | | ELD; 19 | | | BRI; DNQ | MSP | | | | | | | | | | | 38th | 91 |
| 2017 | B. J. McLeod | 36 | Chevy | | | | | | | | | | | | | | | | CHI; 30 | NHA | LVS | TAL | MAR | TEX | PHO | | | | 38th | 91 |
| 2018 | Bayley Currey | 36 | Chevy | DAY | ATL | LVS | MAR | DOV | KAN; 29 | CLT | TEX | IOW | GTW | CHI | KEN | ELD | POC | MCH | BRI | MSP | LVS | TAL | MAR | TEX | PHO | HOM | | | 55th | 8 |
