= 2017 M&M's 200 =

Ninth race of the 2017 NASCAR Camping World Truck Series

2017 M&M's 200 presented by Casey's General Stores
Race details
- Race 9 of 23 of the 2017 NASCAR Camping World Truck Series
- Date: June 23, 2017
- Official name: 9th Annual M&M's 200 presented by Casey's General Stores
- Location: Newton, Iowa, Iowa Speedway
- Course: Permanent racing facility
- Course length: 0.875 miles (1.408 km)
- Distance: 200 laps, 175 mi (281.635 km)
- Scheduled distance: 200 laps, 175 mi (281.635 km)
- Average speed: 97.493 miles per hour (156.900 km/h)

Pole position
Driver	Noah Gragson	Kyle Busch Motorsports
- Time: 23.136

Most laps led
Driver	Christopher Bell	Kyle Busch Motorsports
- Laps: 99

Winner
No. 8	John Hunter Nemechek	NEMCO Motorsports

Television in the United States
- Network: Fox Sports 1
- Announcers: Vince Welch, Phil Parsons, Michael Waltrip

Radio in the United States
- Radio: Motor Racing Network

The 2017 M&M's 200 presented by Casey's General Store was the ninth stock car race of the 2017 NASCAR Camping World Truck Series and the fourth iteration of the event. The race was held on Friday, June 23, 2017, in Newton, Iowa at Iowa Speedway, a 7/8 mile (1.4 km) permanent D-shaped oval racetrack. The race took the scheduled 200 laps to complete. At race's end, John Hunter Nemechek, driving for NEMCO Motorsports, would complete a comeback victory on the final restart with six to go to win his fifth career NASCAR Camping World Truck Series win and his second and final wins of the season. To fill out the podium, Johnny Sauter of GMS Racing and Brandon Jones of MDM Motorsports would finish second and third, respectively.

== Background ==
Iowa Speedway is a 7/8-mile (1.4 km) paved oval motor racing track in Newton, Iowa, United States, approximately 30 miles (48 km) east of Des Moines. The track was designed with influence from Rusty Wallace and patterned after Richmond Raceway, a short track where Wallace was very successful. It has over 25,000 permanent seats as well as a unique multi-tiered Recreational Vehicle viewing area along the backstretch.

=== Entry list ===
- (R) denotes rookie driver.
- (i) denotes driver who is ineligible for series driver points.

#	Driver	Team	Make	Sponsor
0	Jennifer Jo Cobb	Jennifer Jo Cobb Racing	Chevrolet	Driven 2 Honor
1	Jordan Anderson	TJL Motorsports	Chevrolet	Rusty's Offroad
02	Scott Lagasse Jr. (i)	Young's Motorsports	Chevrolet	Randco Industries, Young's Building Systems
4	Christopher Bell	Kyle Busch Motorsports	Toyota	Toyota
6	Norm Benning	Norm Benning Racing	Chevrolet	Norm Benning Racing
8	John Hunter Nemechek	NEMCO Motorsports	Chevrolet	Fire Alarm Services
10	Bryce Napier	Jennifer Jo Cobb Racing	Chevrolet	Driven 2 Honor, ASAP Appliance Service
13	Cody Coughlin (R)	ThorSport Racing	Toyota	JEGS
14	Ted Minor	Long Motorsports	Chevrolet	Edge Guard
16	Ryan Truex	Hattori Racing Enterprises	Toyota	Bar Harbor, Albertsons, Safeway
18	Noah Gragson (R)	Kyle Busch Motorsports	Toyota	Switch
19	Austin Cindric (R)	Brad Keselowski Racing	Ford	Pirtek
20	Tyler Young	Young's Motorsports	Chevrolet	Randco Industries, Young's Building Systems
21	Johnny Sauter	GMS Racing	Chevrolet	Allegiant Air
24	Justin Haley (R)	GMS Racing	Chevrolet	Fraternal Order of Eagles
27	Ben Rhodes	ThorSport Racing	Toyota	Safelite Auto Glass
29	Chase Briscoe (R)	Brad Keselowski Racing	Ford	Cooper-Standard
33	Kaz Grala (R)	GMS Racing	Chevrolet	Kiklos
36	Kevin Donahue	MB Motorsports	Chevrolet	Mittler Bros. Machine & Tool
38	T. J. Bell	Niece Motorsports	Chevrolet	Niece Motorsports
42	Matt Mills*	Martins Motorsports	Chevrolet	Thompson Electric
44	Donnie Levister*	Faith Motorsports	Chevrolet	Sparrow Ranch On The Island
45	Austin Wayne Self	Niece Motorsports	Toyota	B&D Industries, Inc.
49	Wendell Chavous (R)	Premium Motorsports	Chevrolet	Premium Motorsports
50	Josh Reaume	Beaver Motorsports	Chevrolet	Veteran Motorsports Inc., Lodestar Guidance
51	Harrison Burton	Kyle Busch Motorsports	Toyota	Morton Buildings
52	Stewart Friesen	Halmar Friesen Racing	Chevrolet	Halmar
57	J. J. Yeley (i)	Norm Benning Racing	Chevrolet	Norm Benning Racing
63	Kyle Donahue	MB Motorsports	Chevrolet	Mittler Bros. Machine & Tool
66	Trey Hutchens	Bolen Motorsports	Chevrolet	Phone Skope
83	Mike Senica	Copp Motorsports	Chevrolet	PB2 Peanut Butter
87	Joe Nemechek	NEMCO Motorsports	Chevrolet	D. A. B. Constructors, Inc.
88	Matt Crafton	ThorSport Racing	Toyota	Menards, Fisher Nuts
97	Jesse Little	JJL Motorsports	Toyota	Triad CNC
98	Grant Enfinger (R)	ThorSport Racing	Toyota	RIDE TV
99	Brandon Jones (i)	MDM Motorsports	Chevrolet	Soleus Air
Official entry list

== Practice ==
=== First practice ===
The first practice session was held on Friday, June 23, at 9:00 AM CST, and would last for an hour and 25 minutes. Christopher Bell of Kyle Busch Motorsports would set the fastest time in the session, with a lap of 23.289 and an average speed of 135.257 miles per hour (217.675 km/h).

Pos.	#	Driver	Team	Make	Time	Speed
1	4	Christopher Bell	Kyle Busch Motorsports	Toyota	23.289	135.257
2	29	Chase Briscoe (R)	Brad Keselowski Racing	Ford	23.354	134.881
3	97	Jesse Little	JJL Motorsports	Toyota	23.358	134.857
Full first practice results

=== Second and final practice ===
The second and final practice session, sometimes referred to as Happy Hour, was held on Friday, June 23, at 11:15 AM CST, and would last for an hour. Brandon Jones of MDM Motorsports would set the fastest time in the session, with a lap of 23.290 and an average speed of 135.251 miles per hour (217.665 km/h).

Pos.	#	Driver	Team	Make	Time	Speed
1	99	Brandon Jones (i)	MDM Motorsports	Chevrolet	23.290	135.251
2	16	Ryan Truex	Hattori Racing Enterprises	Toyota	23.291	135.245
3	27	Ben Rhodes	ThorSport Racing	Toyota	23.490	134.100
Full Happy Hour practice results

== Qualifying ==
Qualifying was held on Friday, June 23, at 5:05 PM CST. Since Iowa Speedway is under 1.5 miles (2.4 km), the qualifying system was a multi-car system that included three rounds. The first round was 15 minutes, where every driver would be able to set a lap within the 15 minutes. Then, the second round would consist of the fastest 24 cars in Round 1, and drivers would have 10 minutes to set a lap. Round 3 consisted of the fastest 12 drivers from Round 2, and the drivers would have 5 minutes to set a time. Whoever was fastest in Round 3 would win the pole.

Noah Gragson of Kyle Busch Motorsports would win the pole after advancing from both preliminary rounds and setting the fastest lap in Round 3, with a time of 23.136 and an average speed of 136.151 miles per hour (219.114 km/h).

Jennifer Jo Cobb was the only driver to fail to qualify.

=== Full qualifying results ===
Pos.	#	Driver	Team	Make	Time (R1)	Speed (R1)	Time (R2)	Speed (R2)	Time (R3)	Speed (R3)
1	18	Noah Gragson (R)	Kyle Busch Motorsports	Toyota					23.136	136.151
2	4	Christopher Bell	Kyle Busch Motorsports	Toyota					23.195	135.805
3	29	Chase Briscoe (R)	Brad Keselowski Racing	Ford					23.216	135.682
4	21	Johnny Sauter	GMS Racing	Chevrolet					23.277	135.327
5	8	John Hunter Nemechek	NEMCO Motorsports	Chevrolet					23.283	135.292
6	27	Ben Rhodes	ThorSport Racing	Toyota					23.320	135.077
7	24	Justin Haley (R)	GMS Racing	Chevrolet					23.329	135.025
8	16	Ryan Truex	Hattori Racing Enterprises	Toyota					23.384	134.707
9	97	Jesse Little	JJL Motorsports	Toyota					23.404	134.592
10	98	Grant Enfinger (R)	ThorSport Racing	Toyota					23.446	134.351
11	19	Austin Cindric (R)	Brad Keselowski Racing	Ford					23.510	133.986
12	88	Matt Crafton	ThorSport Racing	Toyota					23.605	133.446
Eliminated in Round 2
13	99	Brandon Jones (i)	MDM Motorsports	Chevrolet			23.407	134.575	-	-
14	51	Harrison Burton	Kyle Busch Motorsports	Toyota			23.487	134.117	-	-
15	13	Cody Coughlin (R)	ThorSport Racing	Toyota			23.487	134.117	-	-
16	33	Kaz Grala (R)	GMS Racing	Chevrolet			23.510	133.986	-	-
17	45	Austin Wayne Self	Niece Motorsports	Toyota			23.708	132.867	-	-
18	66	Trey Hutchens	Bolen Motorsports	Chevrolet			23.937	131.595	-	-
19	1	Jordan Anderson	TJL Motorsports	Chevrolet			24.116	130.619	-	-
20	02	Scott Lagasse Jr. (i)	Young's Motorsports	Chevrolet			24.152	130.424	-	-
21	38	T. J. Bell	Niece Motorsports	Chevrolet			24.229	130.009	-	-
22	50	Josh Reaume	Beaver Motorsports	Chevrolet			24.267	129.806	-	-
23	87	Joe Nemechek	NEMCO Motorsports	Chevrolet	23.931	131.628	-	-	-	-
24	63	Kyle Donahue	MB Motorsports	Chevrolet	23.942	131.568	-	-	-	-
Eliminated in Round 2
25	20	Tyler Young	Young's Motorsports	Chevrolet	24.199	130.171	-	-	-	-
26	36	Kevin Donahue	MB Motorsports	Chevrolet	24.541	128.357	-	-	-	-
27	6	Norm Benning	Norm Benning Racing	Chevrolet	25.060	125.698	-	-	-	-
Qualified by owner's points
28	10	Bryce Napier	Jennifer Jo Cobb Racing	Chevrolet	25.120	125.398	-	-	-	-
29	49	Wendell Chavous (R)	Premium Motorsports	Chevrolet	25.285	124.580	-	-	-	-
30	57	J. J. Yeley (i)	Norm Benning Racing	Chevrolet	25.621	122.946	-	-	-	-
31	14	Ted Minor	Long Motorsports	Chevrolet	25.951	121.383	-	-	-	-
32	83	Mike Senica	Copp Motorsports	Chevrolet	26.601	118.417	-	-	-	-
Failed to qualify or withdrew
33	0	Jennifer Jo Cobb	Jennifer Jo Cobb Racing	Chevrolet	-	-	-	-	-	-
WD	42	Matt Mills	Martins Motorsports	Chevrolet	-	-	-	-	-	-
WD	44	Donnie Levister	Faith Motorsports	Chevrolet	-	-	-	-	-	-
WD	52	Stewart Friesen	Halmar Friesen Racing	Chevrolet	-	-	-	-	-	-
Official starting lineup

== Race results ==
Stage 1 Laps: 60

Pos.	#	Driver	Team	Make	Pts
1	4	Christopher Bell	Kyle Busch Motorsports	Toyota	10
2	18	Noah Gragson (R)	Kyle Busch Motorsports	Toyota	9
3	21	Johnny Sauter	GMS Racing	Chevrolet	8
4	29	Chase Briscoe (R)	Brad Keselowski Racing	Ford	7
5	27	Ben Rhodes	ThorSport Racing	Toyota	6
6	16	Ryan Truex	Hattori Racing Enterprises	Toyota	5
7	8	John Hunter Nemechek	NEMCO Motorsports	Chevrolet	4
8	24	Justin Haley (R)	GMS Racing	Chevrolet	3
9	98	Grant Enfinger (R)	ThorSport Racing	Toyota	2
10	19	Austin Cindric (R)	Brad Keselowski Racing	Ford	1

Stage 2 Laps: 60

Pos.	#	Driver	Team	Make	Pts
1	21	Johnny Sauter	GMS Racing	Chevrolet	10
2	29	Chase Briscoe (R)	Brad Keselowski Racing	Ford	9
3	8	John Hunter Nemechek	NEMCO Motorsports	Chevrolet	8
4	4	Christopher Bell	Kyle Busch Motorsports	Toyota	7
5	18	Noah Gragson (R)	Kyle Busch Motorsports	Toyota	6
6	16	Ryan Truex	Hattori Racing Enterprises	Toyota	5
7	19	Austin Cindric (R)	Brad Keselowski Racing	Ford	4
8	97	Jesse Little	JJL Motorsports	Toyota	3
9	88	Matt Crafton	ThorSport Racing	Toyota	2
10	99	Brandon Jones (i)	MDM Motorsports	Chevrolet	0

Stage 3 Laps: 80

Fin	St	#	Driver	Team	Make	Laps	Led	Status	Pts
1	5	8	John Hunter Nemechek	NEMCO Motorsports	Chevrolet	200	6	running	52
2	4	21	Johnny Sauter	GMS Racing	Chevrolet	200	72	running	53
3	13	99	Brandon Jones (i)	MDM Motorsports	Chevrolet	200	0	running	0
4	10	98	Grant Enfinger (R)	ThorSport Racing	Toyota	200	0	running	35
5	2	4	Christopher Bell	Kyle Busch Motorsports	Toyota	200	99	running	49
6	1	18	Noah Gragson (R)	Kyle Busch Motorsports	Toyota	200	16	running	46
7	3	29	Chase Briscoe (R)	Brad Keselowski Racing	Ford	200	7	running	46
8	11	19	Austin Cindric (R)	Brad Keselowski Racing	Ford	200	0	running	34
9	9	97	Jesse Little	JJL Motorsports	Toyota	200	0	running	31
10	7	24	Justin Haley (R)	GMS Racing	Chevrolet	200	0	running	30
11	14	51	Harrison Burton	Kyle Busch Motorsports	Toyota	199	0	running	26
12	15	13	Cody Coughlin (R)	ThorSport Racing	Toyota	199	0	running	25
13	20	02	Scott Lagasse Jr. (i)	Young's Motorsports	Chevrolet	196	0	running	0
14	6	27	Ben Rhodes	ThorSport Racing	Toyota	195	0	running	29
15	19	1	Jordan Anderson	TJL Motorsports	Chevrolet	193	0	running	22
16	18	66	Trey Hutchens	Bolen Motorsports	Chevrolet	192	0	running	21
17	29	49	Wendell Chavous (R)	Premium Motorsports	Chevrolet	191	0	running	20
18	22	50	Josh Reaume	Beaver Motorsports	Chevrolet	185	0	running	19
19	12	88	Matt Crafton	ThorSport Racing	Toyota	184	0	crash	20
20	8	16	Ryan Truex	Hattori Racing Enterprises	Toyota	166	0	overheating	27
21	32	83	Mike Senica	Copp Motorsports	Chevrolet	143	0	too slow	16
22	27	6	Norm Benning	Norm Benning Racing	Chevrolet	126	0	transmission	15
23	17	45	Austin Wayne Self	Niece Motorsports	Toyota	124	0	crash	14
24	16	33	Kaz Grala (R)	GMS Racing	Chevrolet	116	0	crash	13
25	28	10	Bryce Napier	Jennifer Jo Cobb Racing	Chevrolet	98	0	engine	12
26	24	63	Kyle Donahue	MB Motorsports	Chevrolet	68	0	engine	11
27	31	14	Ted Minor	Long Motorsports	Chevrolet	26	0	brakes	10
28	26	36	Kevin Donahue	MB Motorsports	Chevrolet	24	0	brakes	9
29	21	38	T. J. Bell	Niece Motorsports	Chevrolet	15	0	electrical	8
30	25	20	Tyler Young	Young's Motorsports	Chevrolet	12	0	electrical	7
31	23	87	Joe Nemechek	NEMCO Motorsports	Chevrolet	3	0	rear gear	6
32	30	57	J. J. Yeley (i)	Norm Benning Racing	Chevrolet	3	0	oil pump	0
Failed to qualify or withdrew
33		0	Jennifer Jo Cobb	Jennifer Jo Cobb Racing	Chevrolet				
WD		42	Matt Mills	Martins Motorsports	Chevrolet				
WD		44	Donnie Levister	Faith Motorsports	Chevrolet				
WD		52	Stewart Friesen	Halmar Friesen Racing	Chevrolet				
Official race results

== Standings after the race ==
Drivers' Championship standings

Pos	Driver	Points
1	Johnny Sauter	433
2	Christopher Bell	391 (-42)
3	Chase Briscoe	357 (–76)
4	Matt Crafton	338 (–95)
5	Ben Rhodes	310 (–123)
6	Grant Enfinger	300 (–133)
7	Ryan Truex	292 (–141)
8	John Hunter Nemechek	280 (–153)
Official driver's standings

- Note: Only the first 8 positions are included for the driver standings.

Previous race: 2017 Drivin' for Linemen 200	NASCAR Camping World Truck Series; 2017 season	Next race: 2017 Buckle Up in Your Truck 225
