= 2017 Drivin' for Linemen 200 =

Eighth race of the 2017 NASCAR Camping World Truck Series

Race details
- Race 8 of 23 of the 2017 NASCAR Camping World Truck Series
- Date: June 17, 2017
- Official name: 4th Annual Drivin' for Linemen 200
- Location: Madison, Illinois, Gateway Motorsports Park
- Course: Permanent racing facility
- Course length: 1.25 miles (2.01 km)
- Distance: 160 laps, 200 mi (321.868 km)
- Scheduled distance: 160 laps, 200 mi (321.868 km)
- Average speed: 111.836 miles per hour (179.983 km/h)

Pole position
Driver	Chase Briscoe	Brad Keselowski Racing
- Time: 32.888

Most laps led
Driver	Chase Briscoe	Brad Keselowski Racing
- Laps: 88

Winner
No. 8	John Hunter Nemechek	NEMCO Motorsports

Television in the United States
- Network: Fox Sports 1
- Announcers: Vince Welch, Phil Parsons, Todd Bodine

Radio in the United States
- Radio: Motor Racing Network

The 2017 Drivin' for Linemen 200 was the eighth stock car race of the 2017 NASCAR Camping World Truck Series and the fourth iteration of the event. The race was held on Saturday, June 17, 2017, in Madison, Illinois at Gateway Motorsports Park, a 1.25 miles (2.01 km) permanent oval-shaped racetrack. The race took the scheduled 160 laps to complete. At race's end, John Hunter Nemechek, driving for NEMCO Motorsports, would hold off the field on the final restart with four to go to win his fourth career NASCAR Camping World Truck Series win and his first of the season. To fill out the podium, Chase Briscoe of Brad Keselowski Racing and Johnny Sauter of GMS Racing would finish second and third, respectively.

== Background ==
Known as Gateway Motorsports Park until its renaming in April 2019, World Wide Technology Raceway is a 1.25-mile (2.01 km) paved oval motor racing track in Madison, Illinois, United States. The track previously held Truck races from 1998 to 2010, and returned starting in 2014.

=== Entry list ===
- (R) denotes rookie driver.
- (i) denotes driver who is ineligible for series driver points.

#	Driver	Team	Make	Sponsor
0	Bryce Napier	Jennifer Jo Cobb Racing	Chevrolet	Driven 2 Honor
1	Jordan Anderson	TJL Motorsports	Chevrolet	Bommarito Automotive Group
02	Austin Hill	Young's Motorsports	Ford	Young's Motorsports
4	Christopher Bell	Kyle Busch Motorsports	Toyota	JBL
6	Norm Benning	Norm Benning Racing	Chevrolet	Norm Benning Racing
8	John Hunter Nemechek	NEMCO Motorsports	Chevrolet	NEMCO Motorsports
10	Jennifer Jo Cobb	Jennifer Jo Cobb Racing	Chevrolet	Driven 2 Honor, ASAP Appliance Service
13	Cody Coughlin (R)	ThorSport Racing	Toyota	JEGS
16	Ryan Truex	Hattori Racing Enterprises	Toyota	Dierbergs
18	Noah Gragson (R)	Kyle Busch Motorsports	Toyota	Switch
19	Austin Cindric (R)	Brad Keselowski Racing	Ford	Reese Brands, Draw-Tite
21	Johnny Sauter	GMS Racing	Chevrolet	Allegiant Air
24	Justin Haley (R)	GMS Racing	Chevrolet	Kingman Chevrolet
27	Ben Rhodes	ThorSport Racing	Toyota	Safelite Auto Glass
29	Chase Briscoe (R)	Brad Keselowski Racing	Ford	Checkered Flag Foundation
33	Kaz Grala (R)	GMS Racing	Chevrolet	Kiklos
36	Kevin Donahue	MB Motorsports	Chevrolet	Mittler Bros. Machine & Tool
44	Donnie Levister	Faith Motorsports	Chevrolet	Sparrow Ranch On The Island
45	T. J. Bell	Niece Motorsports	Chevrolet	Niece Motorsports
49	Wendell Chavous (R)	Premium Motorsports	Chevrolet	Premium Motorsports
50	Josh Reaume	Beaver Motorsports	Chevrolet	Motorsports Safety Group, Lodestar Guidance
51	Todd Gilliland	Kyle Busch Motorsports	Toyota	Pedigree
52	Stewart Friesen* (R)	Halmar Friesen Racing	Chevrolet	Halmar
57	Tommy Regan	Norm Benning Racing	Chevrolet	Norm Benning Racing
63	Kyle Donahue	MB Motorsports	Chevrolet	Mittler Bros. Machine & Tool
66	Travis Kvapil	Bolen Motorsports	Chevrolet	Bolen Motorsports
68	Clay Greenfield	Clay Greenfield Motorsports	Chevrolet	Semper Fi Fund
83	Camden Murphy	Copp Motorsports	Chevrolet	Copp Motorsports
87	Joe Nemechek	NEMCO Motorsports	Chevrolet	D. A. B. Constructors, Inc.
88	Matt Crafton	ThorSport Racing	Toyota	Menards, FVP Parts
98	Grant Enfinger (R)	ThorSport Racing	Toyota	RIDE TV
99	?*	MDM Motorsports	Chevrolet	
Official entry list

*Withdrew due to different reasons. Friesen would withdraw to reorganize the team, while MDM Motorsports withdrew due to a majorly damaging a truck at the 2017 WinstarOnlineGaming.com 400.

== Practice ==
=== First practice ===
The first practice session was held on Friday, June 16, at 9:30 AM CST, and would last for 55 minutes. Christopher Bell of Kyle Busch Motorsports would set the fastest time in the session, with a lap of 33.081 and an average speed of 136.030 miles per hour (218.919 km/h).

Pos.	#	Driver	Team	Make	Time	Speed
1	4	Christopher Bell	Kyle Busch Motorsports	Toyota	33.081	136.030
2	18	Noah Gragson (R)	Kyle Busch Motorsports	Toyota	33.109	135.915
3	21	Johnny Sauter	GMS Racing	Chevrolet	33.150	135.747
Full first practice results

=== Second and final practice ===
The second and final practice session, sometimes referred to as Happy Hour, was held on Friday, June 16, at 11:30 AM CST, and would last for 55 minutes. Matt Crafton of ThorSport Racing would set the fastest time in the session, with a lap of 33.094 and an average speed of 135.976 miles per hour (218.832 km/h).

Pos.	#	Driver	Team	Make	Time	Speed
1	88	Matt Crafton	ThorSport Racing	Toyota	33.094	135.976
2	8	John Hunter Nemechek	NEMCO Motorsports	Chevrolet	33.156	135.722
3	27	Ben Rhodes	ThorSport Racing	Toyota	33.245	135.359
Full Happy Hour practice results

== Qualifying ==
Qualifying was held on Saturday, June 17, at 4:45 PM CST. Since Gateway Motorsports Park is under 1.5 miles (2.4 km), the qualifying system was a multi-car system that included three rounds. The first round was 15 minutes, where every driver would be able to set a lap within the 15 minutes. Then, the second round would consist of the fastest 24 cars in Round 1, and drivers would have 10 minutes to set a lap. Round 3 consisted of the fastest 12 drivers from Round 2, and the drivers would have 5 minutes to set a time. Whoever was fastest in Round 3 would win the pole.

Chase Briscoe of Brad Keselowski Racing would win the pole after advancing from both preliminary rounds and setting the fastest lap in Round 3, with a time of 32.888 and an average speed of 136.828 miles per hour (220.203 km/h).

No drivers would fail to qualify.

=== Full qualifying results ===
Pos.	#	Driver	Team	Make	Time (R1)	Speed (R1)	Time (R2)	Speed (R2)	Time (R3)	Speed (R3)
1	29	Chase Briscoe (R)	Brad Keselowski Racing	Ford	32.947	136.583	33.094	135.976	32.888	136.828
2	8	John Hunter Nemechek	NEMCO Motorsports	Chevrolet	33.170	135.665	33.204	135.526	32.908	136.745
3	4	Christopher Bell	Kyle Busch Motorsports	Toyota	33.180	135.624	32.898	136.786	32.917	136.707
4	51	Todd Gilliland	Kyle Busch Motorsports	Toyota	33.313	135.082	33.129	135.833	32.944	136.595
5	19	Austin Cindric (R)	Brad Keselowski Racing	Ford	33.255	135.318	33.112	135.902	33.068	136.083
6	88	Matt Crafton	ThorSport Racing	Toyota	33.445	134.549	33.091	135.989	33.079	136.038
7	18	Noah Gragson (R)	Kyle Busch Motorsports	Toyota	33.812	133.089	33.246	135.355	33.109	135.915
8	24	Justin Haley (R)	GMS Racing	Chevrolet	33.374	134.836	33.185	135.603	33.179	135.628
9	21	Johnny Sauter	GMS Racing	Chevrolet	33.216	135.477	33.257	135.310	33.225	135.440
10	33	Kaz Grala (R)	GMS Racing	Chevrolet	33.470	134.449	33.187	135.595	33.227	135.432
11	16	Ryan Truex	Hattori Racing Enterprises	Toyota	33.329	135.018	33.321	135.050	33.355	134.912
12	27	Ben Rhodes	ThorSport Racing	Toyota	33.307	135.107	33.251	135.334	33.431	134.606
Eliminated in Round 2
13	13	Cody Coughlin (R)	ThorSport Racing	Toyota	33.548	134.136	33.353	134.920	-	-
14	98	Grant Enfinger (R)	ThorSport Racing	Toyota	33.836	132.994	33.372	134.844	-	-
15	02	Austin Hill	Young's Motorsports	Ford	33.898	132.751	33.505	134.308	-	-
16	68	Clay Greenfield	Clay Greenfield Motorsports	Chevrolet	33.751	133.329	33.754	133.318	-	-
17	45	T. J. Bell	Niece Motorsports	Chevrolet	34.284	131.257	34.105	131.945	-	-
18	63	Kyle Donahue	MB Motorsports	Chevrolet	34.286	131.249	34.205	131.560	-	-
19	1	Jordan Anderson	TJL Motorsports	Chevrolet	34.861	129.084	34.978	128.652	-	-
20	50	Josh Reaume	Beaver Motorsports	Chevrolet	35.213	127.794	35.389	127.158	-	-
21	66	Travis Kvapil	Bolen Motorsports	Chevrolet	35.131	128.092	-	-	-	-
22	49	Wendell Chavous (R)	Premium Motorsports	Chevrolet	35.550	126.582	-	-	-	-
23	87	Joe Nemechek	NEMCO Motorsports	Chevrolet	35.674	126.142	-	-	-	-
24	36	Kevin Donahue	MB Motorsports	Chevrolet	36.305	123.950	-	-	-	-
Eliminated in Round 1
25	6	Norm Benning	Norm Benning Racing	Chevrolet	36.421	123.555	-	-	-	-
26	83	Camden Murphy	Copp Motorsports	Chevrolet	36.688	122.656	-	-	-	-
27	44	Donnie Levister	Faith Motorsports	Chevrolet	38.593	116.601	-	-	-	-
Qualified by owner's points
28	0	Bryce Napier	Jennifer Jo Cobb Racing	Chevrolet	39.368	114.306	-	-	-	-
29	10	Jennifer Jo Cobb	Jennifer Jo Cobb Racing	Chevrolet	-	-	-	-	-	-
Qualified on time
30	57	Tommy Regan	Norm Benning Racing	Chevrolet	41.710	107.888	-	-	-	-
Withdrew
WD	52	Stewart Friesen	Halmar Friesen Racing	Chevrolet	-	-	-	-	-	-
WD	99	?	MDM Motorsports	Chevrolet	-	-	-	-	-	-
Official qualifying results
Official starting lineup

== Race results ==
Stage 1 Laps: 35

Pos.	#	Driver	Team	Make	Pts
1	8	John Hunter Nemechek	NEMCO Motorsports	Chevrolet	10
2	29	Chase Briscoe (R)	Brad Keselowski Racing	Ford	9
3	88	Matt Crafton	ThorSport Racing	Toyota	8
4	4	Christopher Bell	Kyle Busch Motorsports	Toyota	7
5	16	Ryan Truex	Hattori Racing Enterprises	Toyota	6
6	51	Todd Gilliland	Kyle Busch Motorsports	Toyota	5
7	19	Austin Cindric (R)	Brad Keselowski Racing	Ford	4
8	21	Johnny Sauter	GMS Racing	Chevrolet	3
9	24	Justin Haley (R)	GMS Racing	Chevrolet	2
10	27	Ben Rhodes	ThorSport Racing	Toyota	1

Stage 2 Laps: 35

Pos.	#	Driver	Team	Make	Pts
1	29	Chase Briscoe (R)	Brad Keselowski Racing	Ford	10
2	88	Matt Crafton	ThorSport Racing	Toyota	9
3	8	John Hunter Nemechek	NEMCO Motorsports	Chevrolet	8
4	98	Grant Enfinger (R)	ThorSport Racing	Toyota	7
5	4	Christopher Bell	Kyle Busch Motorsports	Toyota	6
6	21	Johnny Sauter	GMS Racing	Chevrolet	5
7	19	Austin Cindric (R)	Brad Keselowski Racing	Ford	4
8	27	Ben Rhodes	ThorSport Racing	Toyota	3
9	16	Ryan Truex	Hattori Racing Enterprises	Toyota	2
10	51	Todd Gilliland	Kyle Busch Motorsports	Toyota	1

Stage 3 Laps: 90

Fin	St	#	Driver	Team	Make	Laps	Led	Status	Pts
1	2	8	John Hunter Nemechek	NEMCO Motorsports	Chevrolet	160	46	running	58
2	1	29	Chase Briscoe (R)	Brad Keselowski Racing	Ford	160	88	running	54
3	9	21	Johnny Sauter	GMS Racing	Chevrolet	160	0	running	42
4	6	88	Matt Crafton	ThorSport Racing	Toyota	160	16	running	50
5	14	98	Grant Enfinger (R)	ThorSport Racing	Toyota	160	0	running	39
6	3	4	Christopher Bell	Kyle Busch Motorsports	Toyota	160	7	running	44
7	11	16	Ryan Truex	Hattori Racing Enterprises	Toyota	160	0	running	38
8	12	27	Ben Rhodes	ThorSport Racing	Toyota	160	0	running	33
9	7	18	Noah Gragson (R)	Kyle Busch Motorsports	Toyota	160	0	running	28
10	8	24	Justin Haley (R)	GMS Racing	Chevrolet	160	3	running	29
11	5	19	Austin Cindric (R)	Brad Keselowski Racing	Ford	160	0	running	34
12	13	13	Cody Coughlin (R)	ThorSport Racing	Toyota	160	0	running	25
13	10	33	Kaz Grala (R)	GMS Racing	Chevrolet	160	0	running	24
14	15	02	Austin Hill	Young's Motorsports	Ford	159	0	running	13
15	17	45	T. J. Bell	Niece Motorsports	Chevrolet	158	0	running	22
16	18	63	Kyle Donahue	MB Motorsports	Chevrolet	158	0	running	21
17	19	1	Jordan Anderson	TJL Motorsports	Chevrolet	154	0	running	20
18	22	49	Wendell Chavous (R)	Premium Motorsports	Chevrolet	147	0	running	19
19	20	50	Josh Reaume	Beaver Motorsports	Chevrolet	145	0	parked	18
20	28	0	Bryce Napier	Jennifer Jo Cobb Racing	Chevrolet	114	0	brakes	17
21	4	51	Todd Gilliland	Kyle Busch Motorsports	Toyota	112	0	transmission	22
22	25	6	Norm Benning	Norm Benning Racing	Chevrolet	96	0	brakes	15
23	26	83	Camden Murphy	Copp Motorsports	Chevrolet	43	0	brakes	14
24	16	68	Clay Greenfield	Clay Greenfield Motorsports	Chevrolet	26	0	steering	13
25	27	44	Donnie Levister	Faith Motorsports	Chevrolet	17	0	drive shaft	12
26	24	36	Kevin Donahue	MB Motorsports	Chevrolet	11	0	brakes	11
27	21	66	Travis Kvapil	Bolen Motorsports	Chevrolet	3	0	vibration	10
28	23	87	Joe Nemechek	NEMCO Motorsports	Chevrolet	2	0	vibration	9
29	30	57	Tommy Regan	Norm Benning Racing	Chevrolet	1	0	transmission	8
30	29	10	Jennifer Jo Cobb	Jennifer Jo Cobb Racing	Chevrolet	0	0	suspension	7
Withdrew
WD		52	Stewart Friesen	Halmar Friesen Racing	Chevrolet				
WD		99	?	MDM Motorsports	Chevrolet				
Official race results

== Standings after the race ==
Drivers' Championship standings

Pos	Driver	Points
1	Johnny Sauter	380
2	Christopher Bell	342 (-38)
3	Matt Crafton	318 (–62)
4	Chase Briscoe	311 (–69)
5	Ben Rhodes	281 (–99)
6	Grant Enfinger	265 (–115)
7	Ryan Truex	265 (–115)
8	Kaz Grala	234 (–146)
Official driver's standings

- Note: Only the first 8 positions are included for the driver standings.

Previous race: 2017 WinstarOnlineGaming.com 400	NASCAR Camping World Truck Series; 2017 season	Next race: 2017 M&M's 200
