= Tommy Joe Martins =

American racing driver (born 1986)

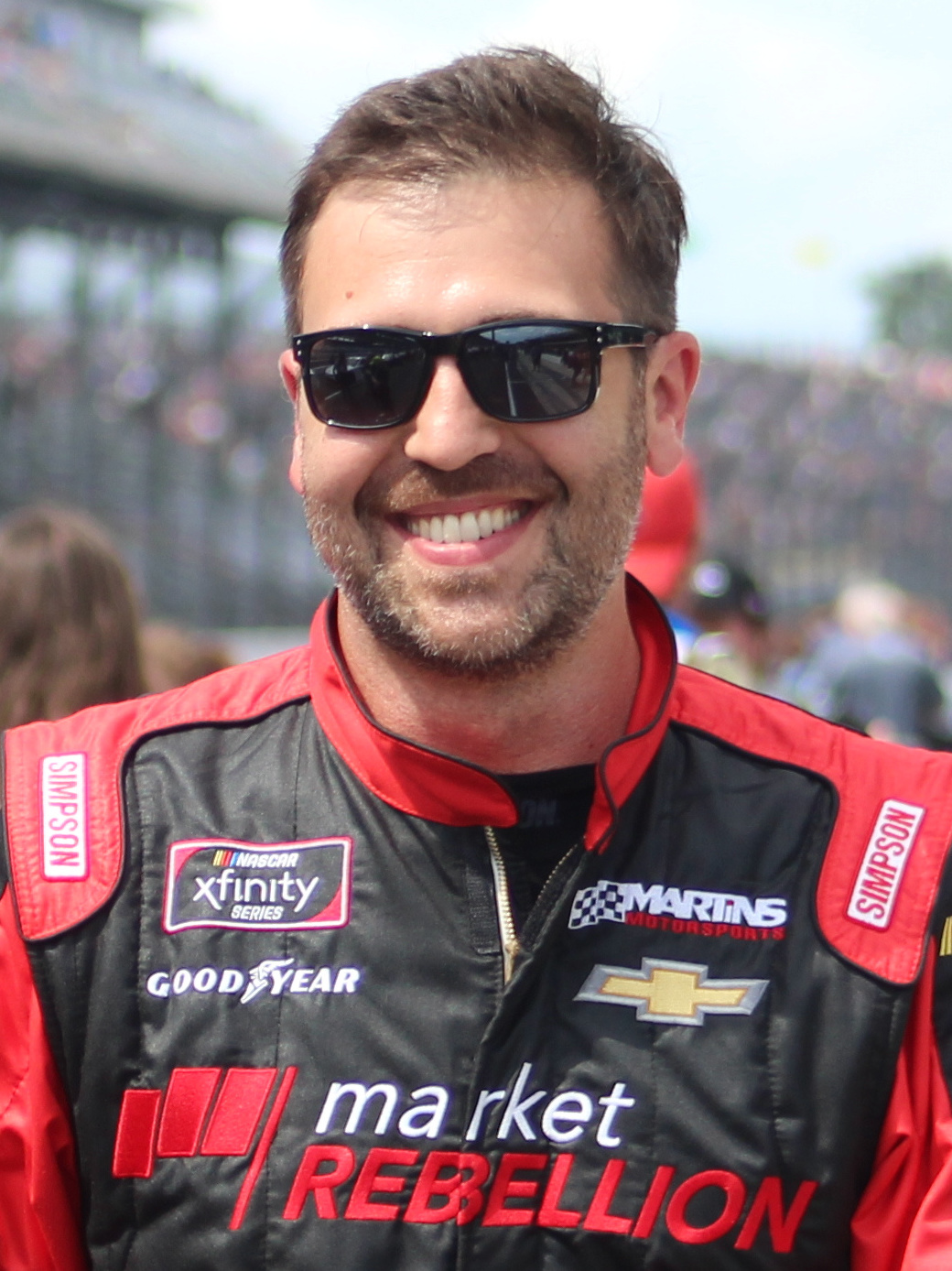
- Martins at Indianapolis Motor Speedway in 2021
- Born: Thomas Joseph Martins; December 7, 1986 (age 39); Como, Mississippi, U.S.

NASCAR O'Reilly Auto Parts Series career
- 129 races run over 8 years
- 2024 position: 61st
- Best finish: 20th (2020, 2021)
- First race: 2014 Blue Jeans Go Green 200 (Phoenix)
- Last race: 2024 United Rentals 250 (Talladega)
Wins	Top tens	Poles
0	1	0

NASCAR FedEx Freight Truck Series career
- 28 races run over 4 years
- 2017 position: 91st
- Best finish: 23rd (2016)
- First race: 2009 AAA Insurance 200 (IRP)
- Last race: 2017 JAG Metals 350 (Texas)
Wins	Top tens	Poles
0	0	0

ARCA Menards Series career
- 2 races run over 2 years
- Best finish: 90th (2010)
- First race: 2010 Lucas Oil Slick Mist 200 (Daytona)
- Last race: 2011 Lucas Oil Slick Mist 200 (Daytona)
Wins	Top tens	Poles
0	1	0
- Statistics up to date as of October 26, 2024.

Thomas Joseph Martins (born December 7, 1986) is an American professional stock car racing driver and owner. He competes part-time in Asphalt Super Late Model competition, driving the No. 44 Chevrolet Camaro for Alpha Prime Racing.

== Racing career ==
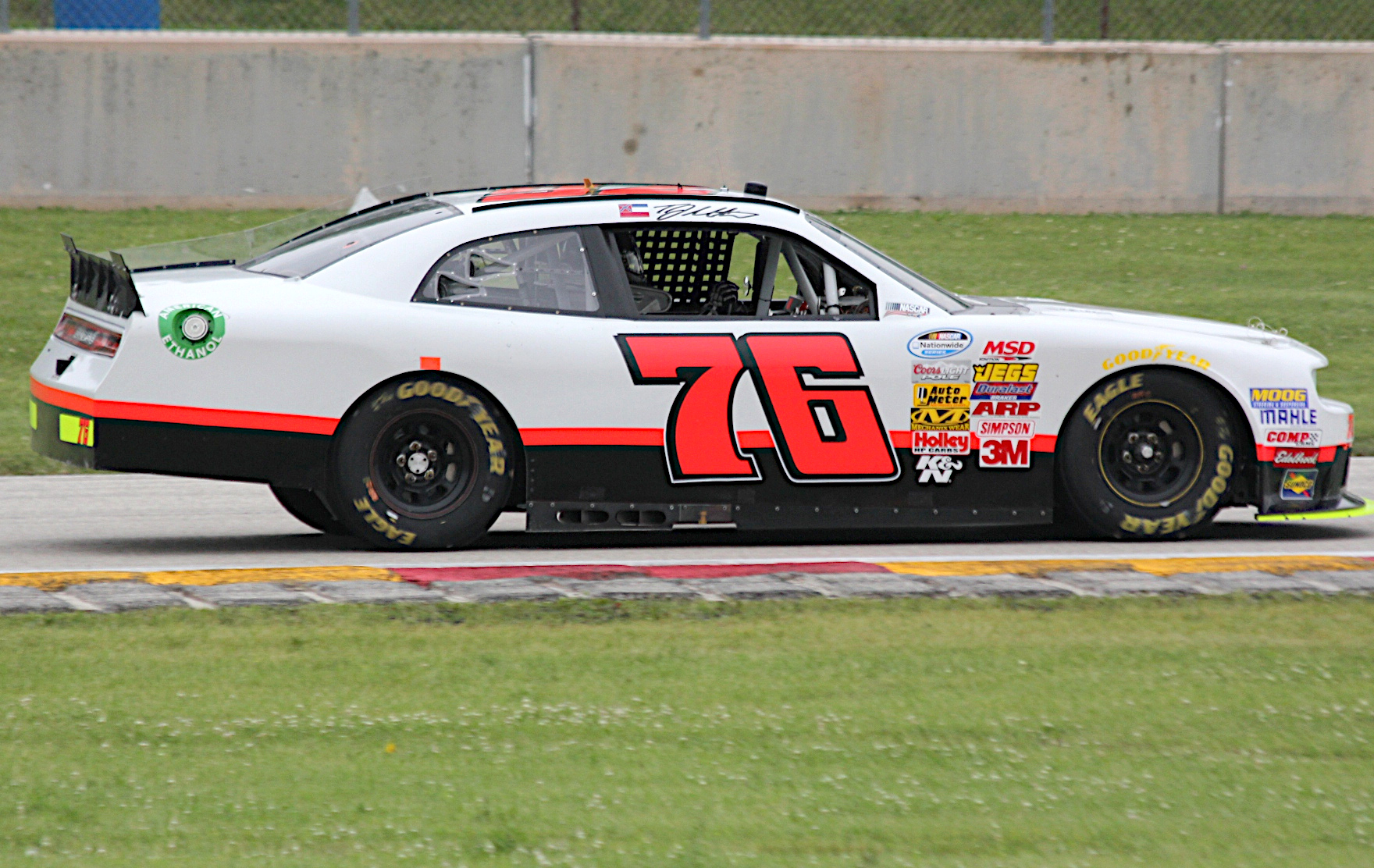
Martins racing at Road America in 2014

Martins began his racing career at the age of five in karting in his native Mississippi. After financial issues caused him to have to quit racing at the age of sixteen, he attended the University of Mississippi seeking a degree in journalism. During his sophomore year, he resumed competition, driving in Sports Car Club of America-sanctioned events.

Choosing to pursue a racing career, Martins joined Nashville-based Baker Curb Racing, then moved to family-owned Martins Motorsports to compete in the NASCAR Camping World Truck Series, running five races between 2009 and 2011. He had one truck and an old engine from Roush Racing. After moving to the ARCA Racing Series on a limited basis, Martins returned to NASCAR in 2014, and planned to run the full Nationwide Series schedule. However, the plans fell apart, and Martins did not race in 2015. In 2016, Martins purchased the owner points of Billy Boat Motorsports' No. 15 truck with plans to run the full 2016 Truck schedule.

Martins ran his own No. 44 truck for the duration of the 2016 season. He ran twenty races, failed to qualify at Homestead-Miami Speedway and recorded a best finish of fifteenth at Michigan International Speedway; however, he missed the Alpha Energy Solutions 200 at Martinsville Speedway after wrecking his truck in qualifying and his spot on the grid was taken by Austin Wayne Self. He also maintained a blog throughout the 2016 season chronicling his journey that gained notoriety within the NASCAR community. His largest blog post was about how the financial situation in NASCAR needed to change.

For 2017, Martins paired up with another family team, Brandonbilt Motorsports, to split the 2017 schedule in the 44 truck. At Daytona International Speedway, Martins was hired to drive the No. 99 Chevrolet for MDM Motorsports, where an early crash relegated him to last in the 32-truck field. Martins would be in the No. 44 truck next week, finishing 23rd at Atlanta. On April 14, 2017, it was announced that Martins would return to the Xfinity Series, bringing his family team to compete for nine races in the No. 45 Chevy. Despite initially planning to begin his schedule at Bristol Motor Speedway, the team withdrew from the weekend due to concern about rain canceling qualifying and preventing the team from attempting to make the race. Martins stepped away from the Truck team to focus on Xfinity and later moved to B. J. McLeod Motorsports to run a partial Xfinity schedule.

After running Martins Motorsports in collaboration with AM Racing and Faith Motorsports in 2017, Martins closed his Truck team and announced another partial Xfinity schedule with McLeod in 2018. He ran over half the schedule with McLeod in 2018, continuing to bring awareness to the performance divide that underfunded teams face; he compared the Xfinity Series to a sports car race with different classes of cars, with Cup-affiliated teams as prototypes and small teams like BJMM in the Grand Touring division.

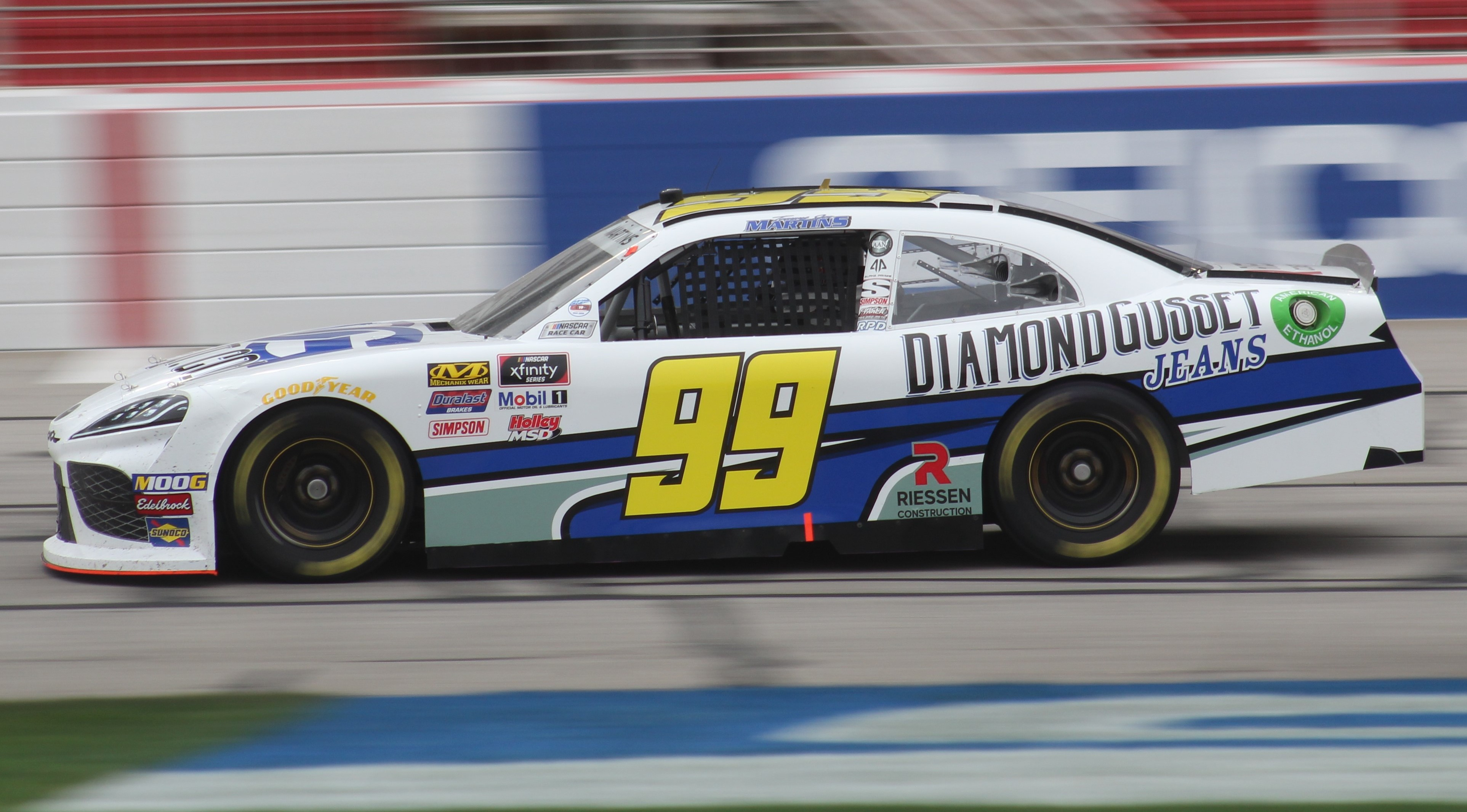
Martins' 2019 Xfinity car at Atlanta Motor Speedway

With Vinnie Miller joining B. J. McLeod Motorsports for 2019 full-time, Martins said he would likely run fewer races than he did in 2018 for the team. At New Hampshire Motor Speedway in July, Martins announced that he would leave BJMM for MBM Motorsports after the New Hampshire race for a partial slate in the back half of the 2019 Xfinity Series season. He estimated his MBM schedule at about six races, including all four road course races, Bristol Motor Speedway, and Texas Motor Speedway. Citing more opportunities in the Xfinity Series and a chance to run in the Monster Energy NASCAR Cup Series with MBM, Martins implied that he held no ill feelings toward McLeod and instead thanked the team for the opportunities throughout his tenure with the team. He ran his first race for MBM at Watkins Glen International, driving the No. 66. On December 8, Martins announced he parted ways with MBM Motorsports. Later in the month on December 24, Martins revealed Martins Motorsports' return for the 2020 Xfinity season as he intended to commit to a full-time schedule.

After several issues in the first half of the 2020 season, including failing to qualify for the season opening race at Daytona, Martins claimed his first career Xfinity Series top-ten at Texas Motor Speedway in October.

On August 30, 2021, Martins confirmed a partnership with Caesar Bacarella to co-own Alpha Prime Racing, with Martins switching to a part-time schedule in 2022 to split the No. 44 with multiple drivers.

== Motorsports career results ==
=== Racing career summary ===
Season	Series	Team	Races	Wins	Top 5	Top 10	Points	Position
2009	NASCAR Camping World Truck Series	Martins Motorsports	4	0	0	0	361	46th
2010	ARCA Racing Series	Tommy Joe Martins Racing	1	0	0	1	190	90th
2011	ARCA Racing Series	Martins Motorsports	1	0	0	0	160	112th
2011	NASCAR Camping World Truck Series	Martins Motorsports	1	0	0	0	11	77th
2014	NASCAR Nationwide Series	Martins Motorsports	11	0	0	0	124	35th
2016	NASCAR Camping World Truck Series	Martins Motorsports	20	0	0	0	176	23rd
2017	NASCAR Camping World Truck Series	MDM Motorsports	1	0	0	0	0	NC†
2017	NASCAR Camping World Truck Series	Martins Motorsports	2	0	0	0	0	NC†
2017	NASCAR Xfinity Series	Martins Motorsports	0	0	0	0	90	39th
2017	NASCAR Xfinity Series	B. J. McLeod Motorsports	9	0	0	0	90	39th
2018	NASCAR Xfinity Series	B. J. McLeod Motorsports	19	0	0	0	216	31st
2019	NASCAR Xfinity Series	B. J. McLeod Motorsports	9	0	0	0	206	28th
2019	NASCAR Xfinity Series	MDM Motorsports	6	0	0	0	206	28th
2020	NASCAR Xfinity Series	Martins Motorsports	32	0	0	1	481	20th
2021	NASCAR Xfinity Series	Martins Motorsports	33	0	0	0	497	20th
2022	NASCAR Xfinity Series	Alpha Prime Racing	5	0	0	0	87	46th
2022	NASCAR Xfinity Series	B. J. McLeod Motorsports	1	0	0	0	87	46th
2023	ASA STARS National Tour	Craig Martins	1	0	0	0	37	75th
2024	CARS Late Model Stock Car Tour	Martins Motorsports	1	0	0	0	0	N/A
2024	NASCAR Xfinity Series	Alpha Prime Racing	1	0	0	0	24	61st

^{†} As Martins was a guest driver, he was ineligible for championship points.

=== NASCAR ===
(key) (Bold – Pole position awarded by qualifying time. Italics – Pole position earned by points standings or practice time. * – Most laps led.)

==== Xfinity Series ====
NASCAR Xfinity Series results
Year	Team	No.	Make	1	2	3	4	5	6	7	8	9	10	11	12	13	14	15	16	17	18	19	20	21	22	23	24	25	26	27	28	29	30	31	32	33	NXSC	Pts	Ref
2014	Martins Motorsports	76	Ford	DAY	PHO; 35	LVS; 39							IOW; 36									IND; DNQ	IOW	GLN	MOH	BRI	ATL	RCH	CHI	KEN	DOV	KAN	CLT	TEX	PHO	HOM	35th	124	
2014	Martins Motorsports	67	Dodge				BRI; DNQ	CAL																													35th	124	
2014	Martins Motorsports	76	Dodge						TEX; 35	DAR; 30	RCH; 36	TAL; 14		CLT; 31	DOV; 35	MCH; DNQ	ROA; 31	KEN; DNQ	DAY; DNQ	NHA	CHI																35th	124	
2014	Martins Motorsports	67	Ford													MCH; 38																					35th	124	
2017	Martins Motorsports	45	Chevy	DAY	ATL	LVS	PHO	CAL	TEX	BRI	RCH; DNQ	TAL	CLT	DOV																							39th	90	
2017	B. J. McLeod Motorsports	78	Chevy												POC; 29	MCH; 28	IOW; 11	DAY	KEN	NHA; 29	IND; 26	IOW; 27	GLN	MOH	BRI; 33	ROA	DAR; 31										39th	90	
2017	B. J. McLeod Motorsports	8	Chevy																									RCH; 29	CHI	KEN	DOV	CLT	KAN	TEX	PHO	HOM	39th	90	
2018	B. J. McLeod Motorsports	8	Chevy	DAY	ATL; 33	LVS; 25	PHO; 27	CAL; 24	TEX	BRI; 26	RCH; 23			CLT; 24	POC; 25												DAR; 22								PHO; 35	HOM; 26	31st	216	
2018	B. J. McLeod Motorsports	8	Toyota									TAL; 18	DOV																								31st	216	
2018	B. J. McLeod Motorsports	78	Chevy													MCH; 24	IOW; 32	CHI	DAY	KEN	NHA; 20	IOW; 21		MOH; 19	BRI	ROA		IND; 27	LVS	RCH	ROV	DOV	KAN	TEX			31st	216	
2018	B. J. McLeod Motorsports	78	Toyota																				GLN; 40														31st	216	
2019	B. J. McLeod Motorsports	99	Toyota	DAY	ATL; 31	LVS	PHO; 35	CAL; 20	TEX; 19	BRI; 26	RCH	TAL	DOV; 21	CLT	POC	MCH; 18	IOW	CHI; 28	DAY	KEN	NHA; 25	IOW															28th	206	
2019	MBM Motorsports	66	Toyota																				GLN; 28	MOH; 18		ROA; 25		IND; 24									28th	206	
2019	MBM Motorsports	13	Toyota																						BRI; 31		DAR; 35										28th	206	
2019	MBM Motorsports	61	Toyota																										LVS; 25	RCH	ROV; 35	DOV	KAN	TEX	PHO; 17	HOM	28th	206	
2020	Martins Motorsports	44	Chevy	DAY; DNQ	LVS; 32	CAL; 18	PHO; 28	DAR; 26	CLT; 24	BRI; 23	ATL; 22	HOM; 31	HOM; 20	TAL; 15	POC; 30	IRC; 35	KEN; 33	KEN; 27	TEX; 15	KAN; 18	ROA; 18	DRC; 13	DOV; 21	DOV; 15	DAY; 14	DAR; 26	RCH; 15	RCH; 26	BRI; 24	LVS; 22	TAL; 15	ROV; 27	KAN; 14	TEX; 10	MAR; 16	PHO; 34	20th	481	
2021	Martins Motorsports	44	Chevy	DAY; 24	DRC; 24	HOM; 18	LVS; 15	PHO; 17	ATL; 18	MAR; 34	TAL; 11	DAR; 15	DOV; 20	COA; 35	CLT; 29	MOH; 39	TEX; 21	NSH; 20	POC; 20	ROA; 15	ATL; 16	NHA; 21	GLN; 19	IRC; 21	MCH; 19	DAY; 18	DAR; 37	RCH; 37	BRI; 23	LVS; 14	TAL; 18	ROV; 33	TEX; 18	KAN; 23	MAR; 40	PHO; 24	20th	497	
2022	Alpha Prime Racing	44	Chevy	DAY; 24	CAL; 31	LVS	PHO																							TEX; 14	TAL	ROV	LVS	HOM	MAR	PHO	46th	87	
2022	Alpha Prime Racing	45	Chevy					ATL; 20	COA	RCH	MAR	TAL	DOV	DAR; 17	TEX	CLT	PIR	NSH	ROA	ATL	NHA	POC	IRC	MCH	GLN	DAY											46th	87	
2022	B. J. McLeod Motorsports	5	Chevy																								DAR; 38	KAN	BRI								46th	87	
2024	Alpha Prime Racing	45	Chevy	DAY	ATL	LVS	PHO	COA	RCH	MAR	TEX	TAL	DOV	DAR	CLT	PIR	SON	IOW	NHA	NSH	CSC	POC	IND	MCH	DAY	DAR	ATL	GLN	BRI	KAN	TAL; 13	ROV	LVS	HOM	MAR	PHO	61st	24	

==== Camping World Truck Series ====
NASCAR Camping World Truck Series results
Year	Team	No.	Make	1	2	3	4	5	6	7	8	9	10	11	12	13	14	15	16	17	18	19	20	21	22	23	24	25	NCWTC	Pts	Ref
2009	Martins Motorsports	44	Ford	DAY	CAL	ATL	MAR	KAN	CLT	DOV	TEX	MCH	MLW	MEM	KEN	IRP; 22	NSH; 27	BRI	CHI; 21	IOW	GTW; 27	NHA	LVS	MAR	TAL	TEX	PHO	HOM	46th	361	
2011	Martins Motorsports	42	Ram	DAY	PHO	DAR	MAR	NSH	DOV	CLT	KAN	TEX	KEN	IOW	NSH	IRP; 33	POC	MCH	BRI	ATL	CHI	NHA	KEN	LVS	TAL	MAR	TEX	HOM	77th	11	
2016	Martins Motorsports	44	Chevy	DAY; 32	ATL; 25	MAR; QL^{†}	KAN; 32	DOV; 24	CLT; 25	TEX; 25	IOW; 30	GTW; 18	KEN; 26	ELD	POC; 17	BRI; 31	MCH; 15	MSP; 19	CHI; 24	NHA; 21	LVS; 22	TAL; 16	MAR; 25	TEX; 31	PHO; 30	HOM; DNQ			23rd	176	
2017	MDM Motorsports	99	Chevy	DAY; 32																									91st	0^{1}	
2017	Martins Motorsports	44	Chevy		ATL; 23	MAR	KAN	CLT	DOV	TEX	GTW	IOW	KEN	ELD	POC	MCH	BRI	MSP	CHI	NHA	LVS	TAL	MAR						91st	0^{1}	
2017	Martins Motorsports	42	Chevy																					TEX; 32	PHO	HOM			91st	0^{1}	
^{†} – Qualified but replaced by Austin Wayne Self.

^{*} Season still in progress
^{1} Ineligible for series points
^{2} Martins started the 2017 season running for Truck Series points but switched to the Xfinity Series starting at Richmond in April.

=== ARCA Racing Series ===
(key) (Bold – Pole position awarded by qualifying time. Italics – Pole position earned by points standings or practice time. * – Most laps led.)

ARCA Racing Series results
Year	Team	No.	Make	1	2	3	4	5	6	7	8	9	10	11	12	13	14	15	16	17	18	19	20	ARSC	Pts	Ref
2010	Tommy Joe Martins Racing	95	Ford	DAY; 8	PBE	SLM	TEX	TAL	TOL	POC	MCH	IOW	MFD	POC	BLN	NJE	ISF	CHI	DSF	TOL	SLM	KAN	CAR	90th	190	
2011	Martins Motorsports	42	Dodge	DAY; 14	TAL	SLM	TOL	NJE	CHI	POC	MCH	WIN	BLN	IOW	IRP	POC	ISF	MAD	DSF	SLM	KAN	TOL		112th	160	

=== CARS Late Model Stock Car Tour ===
(key) (Bold – Pole position awarded by qualifying time. Italics – Pole position earned by points standings or practice time. * – Most laps led. ** – All laps led.)

CARS Late Model Stock Car Tour results
Year	Team	No.	Make	1	2	3	4	5	6	7	8	9	10	11	12	13	14	15	16	17	CLMSCTC	Pts	Ref
2024	Martins Motorsports	44M	Chevy	SNM	HCY	AAS	OCS	ACE	TCM; 23	LGY	DOM	CRW	HCY	NWS	ACE	WCS	FLC	SBO	TCM	NWS	N/A	0	

=== ASA STARS National Tour ===
(key) (Bold – Pole position awarded by qualifying time. Italics – Pole position earned by points standings or practice time. * – Most laps led. ** – All laps led.)

ASA STARS National Tour results
Year	Team	No.	Make	1	2	3	4	5	6	7	8	9	10	ASNTC	Pts	Ref
2023	Craig Martins	44	Chevy	FIF	MAD	NWS	HCY	MLW	AND	WIR	TOL	WIN	NSV; 15	75th	37	
