= 2016 Texas Roadhouse 200 =

20th race of the 2016 NASCAR Camping World Truck Series

Race details
- Race 20 of 23 of the 2016 NASCAR Camping World Truck Series
- Date: October 29, 2016
- Official name: 18th Annual Texas Roadhouse 200
- Location: Martinsville Speedway, Ridgeway, Virginia
- Course: Permanent racing facility
- Course length: 0.526 miles (0.847 km)
- Distance: 200 laps, 105 mi (169 km)
- Scheduled distance: 200 laps, 105 mi (169 km)
- Average speed: 73.839 mph (118.832 km/h)

Pole position
Driver	Chase Elliott	Contreras Motorsports
- Time: 19.673

Most laps led
Driver	Chase Elliott	Contreras Motorsports
- Laps: 109

Winner
No. 21	Johnny Sauter	GMS Racing

Television in the United States
- Network: FS1
- Announcers: Vince Welch, Phil Parsons, and Michael Waltrip

Radio in the United States
- Radio: MRN

The 2016 Texas Roadhouse 200 was the 20th stock car race of the 2016 NASCAR Camping World Truck Series, the first race of the Round of 6, and the 18th iteration of the event. The race was held on Saturday, October 29, 2016, in Ridgeway, Virginia, at Martinsville Speedway, a 0.526-mile (0.847 km) permanent paper-clip shaped racetrack. The race took the scheduled 200 laps to complete. Johnny Sauter, driving for GMS Racing, would hold off a fast-charging Chase Elliott with 19 laps to go, and earned his 12th career NASCAR Camping World Truck Series win, and his second of the season. He would also earn an automatic spot in the championship 4. Elliott mainly dominated the race, leading 105 laps. To fill out the podium, John Hunter Nemechek, driving for NEMCO Motorsports, would finish in 3rd, respectively.

This race would also make history, as Harrison Burton and Kyle Donahue became the first drivers born in the 2000s decade and the 21st century to race in a NASCAR national series event.

== Background ==
The layout of Martinsville Speedway, the venue where the race was held.

Martinsville Speedway is a NASCAR-owned stock car racing short track in Ridgeway, Virginia, just south of Martinsville. At 0.526 miles (847 m) in length, it is the shortest track in the NASCAR Cup Series. The track was also one of the first paved oval tracks in stock car racing, being built in 1947 by partners H. Clay Earles, Henry Lawrence, and Sam Rice, nearly a year before NASCAR was officially formed. It is also the only race track that has been on the NASCAR circuit from its beginning in 1948. Along with this, Martinsville is the only oval track on the NASCAR circuit to have asphalt surfaces on the straightaways and concrete to cover the turns.

=== Entry list ===
- (R) denotes rookie driver.
- (i) denotes driver who is ineligible for series driver points.

#	Driver	Team	Make	Sponsor
00	Cole Custer (R)	JR Motorsports	Chevrolet	OneMain Financial
1	Josh White	Jennifer Jo Cobb Racing	Chevrolet	Hurricane Master Garage Doors
02	Austin Theriault	Young's Motorsports	Chevrolet	Randco, Young's Building Systems
4	Christopher Bell (R)	Kyle Busch Motorsports	Toyota	JBL
05	John Wes Townley	Athenian Motorsports	Chevrolet	Jive Communications, Zaxby's
07	Kevin Donahue	MB Motorsports	Chevrolet	Agile Networks
8	John Hunter Nemechek	NEMCO Motorsports	Chevrolet	Fire Alarm Services
9	William Byron (R)	Kyle Busch Motorsports	Toyota	Liberty University
10	Brad Foy	Jennifer Jo Cobb Racing	Chevrolet	Harvester Performance Center
11	Matt Tifft (R)	Red Horse Racing	Toyota	Brain Gear, Surface Sunscreen
13	Cameron Hayley	ThorSport Racing	Toyota	Ride TV, Cabinets by Hayley
17	Timothy Peters	Red Horse Racing	Toyota	Red Horse Racing
18	Harrison Burton	Kyle Busch Motorsports	Toyota	DEX Imaging
19	Daniel Hemric	Brad Keselowski Racing	Ford	Blue Gate Bank
20	Austin Hill	Austin Hill Racing	Ford	Don Rich Ford
21	Johnny Sauter	GMS Racing	Chevrolet	Smokey Mountain Herbal Snuff
22	Justin Fontaine	AM Racing	Toyota	Promatic Automation
23	Spencer Gallagher	GMS Racing	Chevrolet	Allegiant Travel Company
24	Kaz Grala	GMS Racing	Chevrolet	Kiklos Olive Oil
28	Kyle Soper	FDNY Racing	Chevrolet	FDNY
29	Tyler Reddick	Brad Keselowski Racing	Ford	Cooper-Standard Automotive
33	Ben Kennedy	GMS Racing	Chevrolet	Jacob Companies
41	Ben Rhodes (R)	ThorSport Racing	Toyota	Texas Roadhouse
44	Tommy Joe Martins	Martins Motorsports	Chevrolet	RPM Trailers, Diamond Gusset Jeans
45	Casey Smith	Niece Motorsports	Chevrolet	Niece Equipment
49	D. J. Kennington (i)	Premium Motorsports	Chevrolet	Wilride Transport LTD
50	Travis Kvapil	MAKE Motorsports	Chevrolet	MAKE Motorsports
51	Daniel Suárez (i)	Kyle Busch Motorsports	Toyota	Arris
62	Donnie Levister	Faith Motorsports	Toyota	Shawn Magee Designs
63	Kyle Donahue	MB Motorsports	Chevrolet	Agile Networks
66	Josh Reeves	Mike Harmon Racing	Chevrolet	Glad Precision, Crosley Brands
71	Chase Elliott (i)	Contreras Motorsports	Chevrolet	NAPA Auto Parts, Valvoline
81	Ryan Truex	Hattori Racing Enterprises	Toyota	Aisin AW
88	Matt Crafton	ThorSport Racing	Toyota	Ideal Door, Menards
92	Cole Whitt (i)	RBR Enterprises	Ford	Black's Tire Service, Goodyear
98	Rico Abreu (R)	ThorSport Racing	Toyota	Safelite, Curb Records
Official entry list

== Practice ==
=== First practice ===
The first practice session was held on Friday, October 28, at 12:30 pm EST, and would last for 55 minutes. Daniel Suárez, driving for Kyle Busch Motorsports, would set the fastest time in the session, with a lap of 19.823, and an average speed of 95.525 mph (153.733 km/h).

Pos.	#	Driver	Team	Make	Time	Speed
1	51	Daniel Suárez (i)	Kyle Busch Motorsports	Toyota	19.823	95.525
2	13	Cameron Hayley	ThorSport Racing	Toyota	19.835	95.468
3	9	William Byron (R)	Kyle Busch Motorsports	Toyota	19.848	95.405
Full first practice results

=== Final practice ===
The final practice session was held on Friday, October 28, at 2:30 pm EST, and would last for 1 hour and 50 minutes. William Byron, driving for Kyle Busch Motorsports, would set the fastest time in the session, with a lap of 19.687, and an average speed of 96.185 mph (154.795 km/h).

Pos.	#	Driver	Team	Make	Time	Speed
1	9	William Byron (R)	Kyle Busch Motorsports	Toyota	19.687	96.185
2	21	Johnny Sauter	GMS Racing	Chevrolet	19.749	95.883
3	51	Daniel Suárez (i)	Kyle Busch Motorsports	Toyota	19.757	95.845
Full final practice results

== Qualifying ==
Qualifying was held on Saturday, October 29, at 10:15 am EST. Since Martinsville Speedway is under 1.5 miles (2.4 km) in length, the qualifying system is a multi-car system that included three rounds. The first round was 15 minutes, where every driver would be able to set a lap within the 15 minutes. Then, the second round would consist of the fastest 24 cars in Round 1, and drivers would have 10 minutes to set a lap. Round 3 consisted of the fastest 12 drivers from Round 2, and the drivers would have 5 minutes to set a time. Whoever was fastest in Round 3 would win the pole.

Chase Elliott, driving for Contreras Motorsports, would score the pole for the race, with a lap of 19.673, and an average speed of 96.254 mph (154.906 km/h) in the third round.

Brad Foy, Casey Smith, Kyle Soper, and Donnie Levister would fail to qualify.

=== Full qualifying results ===
Pos.	#	Driver	Team	Make	Time (R1)	Speed (R1)	Time (R2)	Speed (R2)	Time (R3)	Speed (R3)
1	71	Chase Elliott (i)	Contreras Motorsports	Chevrolet	19.773	95.767	19.700	96.122	19.673	96.254
2	51	Daniel Suárez (i)	Kyle Busch Motorsports	Toyota	19.948	94.927	19.751	95.874	19.741	95.922
3	00	Cole Custer (R)	JR Motorsports	Chevrolet	19.874	95.280	19.780	95.733	19.745	95.903
4	29	Tyler Reddick	Brad Keselowski Racing	Ford	19.924	95.041	19.827	95.506	19.749	95.883
5	21	Johnny Sauter	GMS Racing	Chevrolet	19.905	95.132	19.798	95.646	19.755	95.854
6	4	Christopher Bell (R)	Kyle Busch Motorsports	Toyota	19.818	95.550	19.750	95.878	19.778	95.743
7	9	William Byron (R)	Kyle Busch Motorsports	Toyota	19.942	94.955	19.790	95.685	19.780	95.733
8	13	Cameron Hayley	ThorSport Racing	Toyota	19.845	95.420	19.847	95.410	19.797	95.651
9	11	Matt Tifft (R)	Red Horse Racing	Toyota	19.903	95.141	19.846	95.415	19.871	95.295
10	24	Kaz Grala	GMS Racing	Chevrolet	19.930	95.013	19.815	95.564	19.877	95.266
11	88	Matt Crafton	ThorSport Racing	Toyota	19.995	94.704	19.820	95.540	19.889	95.208
12	8	John Hunter Nemechek	NEMCO Motorsports	Chevrolet	20.096	94.228	19.856	95.367	19.958	94.879
Eliminated in Round 2
13	19	Daniel Hemric	Brad Keselowski Racing	Ford	20.073	94.336	19.862	95.338	-	-
14	41	Ben Rhodes (R)	ThorSport Racing	Toyota	19.989	94.732	19.863	95.333	-	-
15	20	Austin Hill	Austin Hill Racing	Ford	20.003	94.666	19.878	95.261	-	-
16	18	Harrison Burton	Kyle Busch Motorsports	Toyota	20.011	94.628	19.887	95.218	-	-
17	23	Spencer Gallagher	GMS Racing	Chevrolet	19.952	94.908	19.894	95.184	-	-
18	33	Ben Kennedy	GMS Racing	Chevrolet	19.897	95.170	19.907	95.122	-	-
19	17	Timothy Peters	Red Horse Racing	Toyota	20.076	94.322	19.915	95.084	-	-
20	05	John Wes Townley	Athenian Motorsports	Chevrolet	20.046	94.463	19.924	95.041	-	-
21	92	Cole Whitt (i)	RBR Enterprises	Ford	20.094	94.237	20.021	94.581	-	-
22	63	Kyle Donahue	MB Motorsports	Chevrolet	20.082	94.293	20.093	94.242	-	-
23	81	Ryan Truex	Hattori Racing Enterprises	Toyota	20.055	94.420	20.123	94.101	-	-
24	98	Rico Abreu (R)	ThorSport Racing	Toyota	20.100	94.209	20.153	93.961	-	-
Eliminated in Round 1
25	44	Tommy Joe Martins	Martins Motorsports	Chevrolet	20.111	94.157	-	-	-	-
26	49	D. J. Kennington (i)	Premium Motorsports	Chevrolet	20.147	93.989	-	-	-	-
27	02	Austin Theriault	Young's Motorsports	Chevrolet	20.173	93.868	-	-	-	-
Qualified by owner's points
28	22	Justin Fontaine	AM Racing	Toyota	20.418	92.742	-	-	-	-
29	07	Kevin Donahue	MB Motorsports	Chevrolet	20.667	91.624	-	-	-	-
30	66	Josh Reeves	Mike Harmon Racing	Chevrolet	20.905	90.581	-	-	-	-
31	1	Josh White	Jennifer Jo Cobb Racing	Chevrolet	21.325	88.797	-	-	-	-
32	50	Travis Kvapil	MAKE Motorsports	Chevrolet	-	-	-	-	-	-
Failed to qualify
33	10	Brad Foy	Jennifer Jo Cobb Racing	Chevrolet	20.305	93.258	-	-	-	-
34	45	Casey Smith	Niece Motorsports	Chevrolet	20.335	93.120	-	-	-	-
35	28	Kyle Soper	FDNY Racing	Chevrolet	20.702	91.469	-	-	-	-
36	62	Donnie Levister	Faith Motorsports	Toyota	21.037	90.013	-	-	-	-
Official qualifying results
Official starting lineup

== Race results ==
Fin	St	#	Driver	Team	Make	Laps	Led	Status	Pts
1	5	21	Johnny Sauter	GMS Racing	Chevrolet	200	50	Running	36
2	1	71	Chase Elliott (i)	Contreras Motorsports	Chevrolet	200	109	Running	0
3	12	8	John Hunter Nemechek	NEMCO Motorsports	Chevrolet	200	18	Running	31
4	6	4	Christopher Bell (R)	Kyle Busch Motorsports	Toyota	200	0	Running	29
5	19	17	Timothy Peters	Red Horse Racing	Toyota	200	0	Running	28
6	2	51	Daniel Suárez (i)	Kyle Busch Motorsports	Toyota	200	0	Running	0
7	3	00	Cole Custer (R)	JR Motorsports	Chevrolet	200	17	Running	27
8	7	9	William Byron (R)	Kyle Busch Motorsports	Toyota	200	0	Running	25
9	13	19	Daniel Hemric	Brad Keselowski Racing	Ford	200	6	Running	25
10	15	20	Austin Hill	Austin Hill Racing	Ford	200	0	Running	23
11	8	13	Cameron Hayley	ThorSport Racing	Toyota	200	0	Running	22
12	21	92	Cole Whitt (i)	RBR Enterprises	Ford	200	0	Running	0
13	4	29	Tyler Reddick	Brad Keselowski Racing	Ford	200	0	Running	20
14	23	81	Ryan Truex	Hattori Racing Enterprises	Toyota	200	0	Running	19
15	10	24	Kaz Grala	GMS Racing	Chevrolet	200	0	Running	18
16	9	11	Matt Tifft (R)	Red Horse Racing	Toyota	200	0	Running	17
17	11	88	Matt Crafton	ThorSport Racing	Toyota	200	0	Running	16
18	18	33	Ben Kennedy	GMS Racing	Chevrolet	200	0	Running	15
19	14	41	Ben Rhodes (R)	ThorSport Racing	Toyota	200	0	Running	14
20	27	02	Austin Theriault	Young's Motorsports	Chevrolet	200	0	Running	13
21	20	05	John Wes Townley	Athenian Motorsports	Chevrolet	200	0	Running	12
22	16	18	Harrison Burton	Kyle Busch Motorsports	Toyota	199	0	Running	11
23	26	49	D. J. Kennington (i)	Premium Motorsports	Chevrolet	199	0	Running	0
24	24	98	Rico Abreu (R)	ThorSport Racing	Toyota	198	0	Running	9
25	25	44	Tommy Joe Martins	Martins Motorsports	Chevrolet	197	0	Running	8
26	28	22	Justin Fontaine	AM Racing	Toyota	195	0	Running	7
27	32	50	Travis Kvapil	MAKE Motorsports	Chevrolet	192	0	Running	6
28	30	66	Josh Reeves	Mike Harmon Racing	Chevrolet	191	0	Running	5
29	17	23	Spencer Gallagher	GMS Racing	Chevrolet	179	0	Running	4
30	29	07	Kevin Donahue	MB Motorsports	Chevrolet	115	0	Engine	3
31	22	63	Kyle Donahue	MB Motorsports	Chevrolet	48	0	Accident	2
32	31	1	Josh White	Jennifer Jo Cobb Racing	Chevrolet	45	0	Accident	1
Official race results

== Standings after the race ==
Drivers' Championship standings

	Pos	Driver	Points
5	1	Johnny Sauter	3,036
	2	Christopher Bell	3,029 (−7)
	3	Timothy Peters	3,028 (−8)
3	4	William Byron	3,025 (−11)
1	5	Matt Crafton	3,016 (−20)
1	6	Ben Kennedy	3,015 (−21)
	7	Daniel Hemric	2,084 (−952)
	8	John Hunter Nemechek	2,069 (−967)
Official driver's standings

- Note: Only the first 8 positions are included for the driver standings.

Previous race: 2016 Fred's 250	NASCAR Camping World Truck Series; 2016 season	Next race: 2016 Striping Technology 350
