= 2017 JAG Metals 350 =

21st race of the 2017 NASCAR Camping World Truck Series

2017 JAG Metals 350 Driving Hurricane Harvey Relief
Race details
- Race 21 of 23 of the 2017 NASCAR Camping World Truck Series
- Date: November 3, 2017
- Official name: 19th Annual JAG Metals 350 Driving Hurricane Harvey Relief
- Location: Fort Worth, Texas, Texas Motor Speedway
- Course: Permanent racing facility
- Course length: 1.5 miles (2.41 km)
- Distance: 147 laps, 220.5 mi (354.86 km)
- Scheduled distance: 147 laps, 220.5 mi (804.672 km)
- Average speed: 131.38 miles per hour (211.44 km/h)

Pole position
Driver	Justin Haley	GMS Racing
- Time: 29.004

Most laps led
Driver	Austin Cindric	Brad Keselowski Racing
- Laps: 36

Winner
No. 21	Johnny Sauter	GMS Racing

Television in the United States
- Network: Fox Sports 1
- Announcers: Vince Welch, Phil Parsons, Michael Waltrip

Radio in the United States
- Radio: Motor Racing Network

The 2017 JAG Metals 350 Driving Hurricane Harvey Relief was the 21st stock car race of the 2017 NASCAR Camping World Truck Series, the fifth race of the 2017 NASCAR Camping World Truck Series playoffs, the second race of the Round of 6, and the 19th iteration of the event. The race was held on Friday, November 3, 2017, in Fort Worth, Texas at Texas Motor Speedway, a 1.5 miles (2.4 km) permanent quad-oval racetrack. The race took the scheduled 147 laps to complete. At race's end, Johnny Sauter, driving for GMS Racing, would control the last 13 laps of the race to win his 16th career NASCAR Camping World Truck Series win and his third of the season. To fill out the podium, Austin Cindric of Brad Keselowski Racing and Christopher Bell of Kyle Busch Motorsports would finish second and third, respectively.

== Background ==
The layout of Texas Motor Speedway, the venue where the race was held.

Texas Motor Speedway is a speedway located in the northernmost portion of the U.S. city of Fort Worth, Texas – the portion located in Denton County, Texas. The track measures 1.5 miles (2.4 km) around and is banked 24 degrees in the turns, and is of the oval design, where the front straightaway juts outward slightly. The track layout is similar to Atlanta Motor Speedway and Charlotte Motor Speedway (formerly Lowe's Motor Speedway). The track is owned by Speedway Motorsports, Inc., the same company that owns Atlanta and Charlotte Motor Speedway, as well as the short-track Bristol Motor Speedway.

=== Entry list ===
- (R) denotes rookie driver.
- (i) denotes driver who is ineligible for series driver points.

#	Driver	Team	Make	Sponsor
0	Ray Ciccarelli	Jennifer Jo Cobb Racing	Chevrolet	Driven 2 Honor
1	Jordan Anderson	TJL Motorsports	Chevrolet	Bommarito Automotive Group, Knight Fire Protection
02	Austin Hill	Young's Motorsports	Ford	United Rentals
4	Christopher Bell	Kyle Busch Motorsports	Toyota	JBL
6	Norm Benning	Norm Benning Racing	Chevrolet	Norm Benning Racing
8	John Hunter Nemechek	NEMCO Motorsports	Chevrolet	ROMCO Equipment Co.
10	Jennifer Jo Cobb	Jennifer Jo Cobb Racing	Chevrolet	Driven 2 Honor
13	Cody Coughlin (R)	ThorSport Racing	Toyota	JEGS
15	Gray Gaulding (i)	Premium Motorsports	Chevrolet	Premium Motorsports
16	Ryan Truex	Hattori Racing Enterprises	Toyota	Chiba Toyopet
18	Noah Gragson (R)	Kyle Busch Motorsports	Toyota	Switch
19	Austin Cindric (R)	Brad Keselowski Racing	Ford	Fitzgerald Glider Kits
20	Tyler Young	Young's Motorsports	Chevrolet	CNR Electric
21	Johnny Sauter	GMS Racing	Chevrolet	ISM Connect
24	Justin Haley (R)	GMS Racing	Chevrolet	Zeality
27	Ben Rhodes	ThorSport Racing	Toyota	Safelite AutoGlass
29	Chase Briscoe (R)	Brad Keselowski Racing	Ford	Cooper-Standard
33	Kaz Grala (R)	GMS Racing	Chevrolet	Stealth
42	Tommy Joe Martins (i)	Martins Motorsports	Chevrolet	Diamond Gusset Jeans
44	Ted Minor	Faith Motorsports	Chevrolet	Shawn Magee Design
45	Austin Wayne Self	Niece Motorsports	Chevrolet	AM Technical Solutions, Sorghum
49	Wendell Chavous (R)	Premium Motorsports	Chevrolet	Low T Center
50	Josh Reaume	Beaver Motorsports	Chevrolet	Motorsports Safety Group
51	Myatt Snider	Kyle Busch Motorsports	Toyota	Liberty Tax Service
52	Stewart Friesen (R)	Halmar Friesen Racing	Chevrolet	Halmar "We Build America"
57	Mike Senica	Norm Benning Racing	Chevrolet	Norm Benning Racing
63	J. J. Yeley (i)	MB Motorsports	Chevrolet	Fr8Auctions
83	Patrick Emerling	Copp Motorsports	Chevrolet	Fr8Auctions, Cue Vapor Systems
87	Joe Nemechek	NEMCO Motorsports	Chevrolet	ROMCO Equipment Co., Fire Alarm Services
88	Matt Crafton	ThorSport Racing	Toyota	Menards, Ideal Door
92	Regan Smith	RBR Enterprises	Ford	BTS Tire & Wheel Distributors, Advance Auto Parts
98	Grant Enfinger (R)	ThorSport Racing	Toyota	RIDE TV
Official entry list

== Practice ==
=== First practice ===
The first practice session was held on Thursday, November 2, at 2:00 PM CST. The session would last for 55 minutes. Johnny Sauter of GMS Racing would set the fastest time in the session, with a lap of 29.529 and an average speed of 182.871 mph (294.302 km/h).

Pos.	#	Driver	Team	Make	Time	Speed
1	21	Johnny Sauter	GMS Racing	Chevrolet	29.529	182.871
2	18	Noah Gragson (R)	Kyle Busch Motorsports	Toyota	29.531	182.859
3	16	Ryan Truex	Hattori Racing Enterprises	Toyota	29.536	182.828
Full first practice results

=== Second and final practice ===
The final practice session, sometimes known as Happy Hour, was held on Thursday, November 2, at 2:00 PM CST. The session would last for 55 minutes. Grant Enfinger of ThorSport Racing would set the fastest time in the session, with a lap of 29.146 and an average speed of 185.274 mph (298.170 km/h).

Pos.	#	Driver	Team	Make	Time	Speed
1	98	Grant Enfinger (R)	ThorSport Racing	Toyota	29.146	185.274
2	51	Myatt Snider	Kyle Busch Motorsports	Toyota	29.251	184.609
3	19	Austin Cindric (R)	Brad Keselowski Racing	Ford	29.281	184.420
Full Happy Hour practice results

== Qualifying ==
Qualifying was held on Friday, November 3, at 3:00 PM CST. Since Texas Motor Speedway is at least a 1.5 miles (2.4 km) racetrack, the qualifying system was a single car, single lap, two round system where in the first round, everyone would set a time to determine positions 13–32. Then, the fastest 12 qualifiers would move on to the second round to determine positions 1–12.

Justin Haley of GMS Racing would win the pole, setting a lap of 29.004 and an average speed of 186.181 miles per hour (299.629 km/h) in the second round.

No drivers would fail to qualify.

=== Full qualifying results ===
Pos.	#	Driver	Team	Make	Time (R1)	Speed (R1)	Time (R2)	Speed (R2)
1	24	Justin Haley (R)	GMS Racing	Chevrolet	-*	-*	29.004	186.181
2	18	Noah Gragson (R)	Kyle Busch Motorsports	Toyota	-*	-*	29.024	186.053
3	4	Christopher Bell	Kyle Busch Motorsports	Toyota	-*	-*	29.035	185.982
4	21	Johnny Sauter	GMS Racing	Chevrolet	-*	-*	29.054	185.861
5	16	Ryan Truex	Hattori Racing Enterprises	Toyota	-*	-*	29.206	184.894
6	19	Austin Cindric (R)	Brad Keselowski Racing	Ford	-*	-*	29.207	184.887
7	33	Kaz Grala (R)	GMS Racing	Chevrolet	-*	-*	29.257	184.571
8	88	Matt Crafton	ThorSport Racing	Toyota	-*	-*	29.292	184.351
9	27	Ben Rhodes	ThorSport Racing	Toyota	-*	-*	29.370	183.861
10	29	Chase Briscoe (R)	Brad Keselowski Racing	Ford	-*	-*	29.372	183.849
11	8	John Hunter Nemechek	NEMCO Motorsports	Chevrolet	-*	-*	29.662	182.051
12	51	Myatt Snider	Kyle Busch Motorsports	Toyota	-*	-*	30.491	177.101
Eliminated in Round 1
13	20	Tyler Young	Young's Motorsports	Chevrolet	29.612	182.359	-	-
14	92	Regan Smith	RBR Enterprises	Ford	29.692	181.867	-	-
15	13	Cody Coughlin (R)	ThorSport Racing	Toyota	29.729	181.641	-	-
16	52	Stewart Friesen (R)	Halmar Friesen Racing	Chevrolet	29.808	181.159	-	-
17	02	Austin Hill	Young's Motorsports	Ford	29.831	181.020	-	-
18	45	Austin Wayne Self	Niece Motorsports	Chevrolet	29.892	180.650	-	-
19	98	Grant Enfinger (R)	ThorSport Racing	Toyota	29.929	180.427	-	-
20	15	Gray Gaulding (i)	Premium Motorsports	Chevrolet	30.261	178.448	-	-
21	49	Wendell Chavous (R)	Premium Motorsports	Chevrolet	30.339	177.989	-	-
22	87	Joe Nemechek	NEMCO Motorsports	Chevrolet	30.437	177.416	-	-
23	83	Patrick Emerling	Copp Motorsports	Chevrolet	30.812	175.256	-	-
24	1	Jordan Anderson	TJL Motorsports	Chevrolet	30.942	174.520	-	-
25	63	J. J. Yeley (i)	MB Motorsports	Chevrolet	31.141	173.405	-	-
26	50	Josh Reaume	Beaver Motorsports	Chevrolet	31.819	169.710	-	-
27	0	Ray Ciccarelli	Jennifer Jo Cobb Racing	Chevrolet	31.977	168.871	-	-
Qualified by owner's points
28	10	Jennifer Jo Cobb	Jennifer Jo Cobb Racing	Chevrolet	32.282	167.276	-	-
29	6	Norm Benning	Norm Benning Racing	Chevrolet	33.265	162.333	-	-
30	44	Ted Minor	Faith Motorsports	Chevrolet	34.103	158.344	-	-
31	57	Mike Senica	Norm Benning Racing	Chevrolet	35.205	153.387	-	-
32	42	Tommy Joe Martins (i)	Martins Motorsports	Chevrolet	-	-	-	-
Official starting lineup

*Time not available.

== Race results ==
Stage 1 Laps: 35

Pos.	#	Driver	Team	Make	Pts
1	4	Christopher Bell	Kyle Busch Motorsports	Toyota	10
2	21	Johnny Sauter	GMS Racing	Chevrolet	9
3	19	Austin Cindric (R)	Brad Keselowski Racing	Ford	8
4	27	Ben Rhodes	ThorSport Racing	Toyota	7
5	8	John Hunter Nemechek	NEMCO Motorsports	Chevrolet	6
6	88	Matt Crafton	ThorSport Racing	Toyota	5
7	92	Regan Smith	RBR Enterprises	Ford	4
8	33	Kaz Grala (R)	GMS Racing	Chevrolet	3
9	51	Myatt Snider	Kyle Busch Motorsports	Toyota	2
10	18	Noah Gragson (R)	Kyle Busch Motorsports	Toyota	1

Stage 2 Laps: 35

Pos.	#	Driver	Team	Make	Pts
1	18	Noah Gragson (R)	Kyle Busch Motorsports	Toyota	10
2	92	Regan Smith	RBR Enterprises	Ford	9
3	4	Christopher Bell	Kyle Busch Motorsports	Toyota	8
4	33	Kaz Grala (R)	GMS Racing	Chevrolet	7
5	16	Ryan Truex	Hattori Racing Enterprises	Toyota	6
6	27	Ben Rhodes	ThorSport Racing	Toyota	5
7	19	Austin Cindric (R)	Brad Keselowski Racing	Ford	4
8	88	Matt Crafton	ThorSport Racing	Toyota	3
9	21	Johnny Sauter	GMS Racing	Chevrolet	2
10	8	John Hunter Nemechek	NEMCO Motorsports	Chevrolet	1

Stage 3 Laps: 77

Fin	St	#	Driver	Team	Make	Laps	Led	Status	Pts
1	4	21	Johnny Sauter	GMS Racing	Chevrolet	147	21	running	51
2	6	19	Austin Cindric (R)	Brad Keselowski Racing	Ford	147	36	running	47
3	3	4	Christopher Bell	Kyle Busch Motorsports	Toyota	147	20	running	52
4	10	29	Chase Briscoe (R)	Brad Keselowski Racing	Ford	147	1	running	33
5	1	24	Justin Haley (R)	GMS Racing	Chevrolet	147	25	running	32
6	7	33	Kaz Grala (R)	GMS Racing	Chevrolet	147	0	running	41
7	19	98	Grant Enfinger (R)	ThorSport Racing	Toyota	147	1	running	30
8	5	16	Ryan Truex	Hattori Racing Enterprises	Toyota	147	0	running	35
9	8	88	Matt Crafton	ThorSport Racing	Toyota	147	5	running	36
10	2	18	Noah Gragson (R)	Kyle Busch Motorsports	Toyota	147	9	running	38
11	17	02	Austin Hill	Young's Motorsports	Ford	147	0	running	28
12	12	51	Myatt Snider	Kyle Busch Motorsports	Toyota	147	21	running	38
13	14	92	Regan Smith	RBR Enterprises	Ford	147	0	running	24
14	16	52	Stewart Friesen (R)	Halmar Friesen Racing	Chevrolet	147	0	running	23
15	18	45	Austin Wayne Self	Niece Motorsports	Chevrolet	146	0	running	22
16	15	13	Cody Coughlin (R)	ThorSport Racing	Toyota	145	0	running	21
17	13	20	Tyler Young	Young's Motorsports	Chevrolet	145	0	running	20
18	9	27	Ben Rhodes	ThorSport Racing	Toyota	145	0	running	31
19	11	8	John Hunter Nemechek	NEMCO Motorsports	Chevrolet	145	8	running	25
20	26	50	Josh Reaume	Beaver Motorsports	Chevrolet	139	0	running	17
21	21	49	Wendell Chavous (R)	Premium Motorsports	Chevrolet	138	0	running	16
22	28	10	Jennifer Jo Cobb	Jennifer Jo Cobb Racing	Chevrolet	130	0	running	15
23	29	6	Norm Benning	Norm Benning Racing	Chevrolet	92	0	brakes	14
24	24	1	Jordan Anderson	TJL Motorsports	Chevrolet	70	0	power steering	13
25	30	44	Ted Minor	Faith Motorsports	Chevrolet	41	0	engine	12
26	23	83	Patrick Emerling	Copp Motorsports	Chevrolet	24	0	crash	11
27	20	15	Gray Gaulding (i)	Premium Motorsports	Chevrolet	23	0	electrical	0
28	27	0	Ray Ciccarelli	Jennifer Jo Cobb Racing	Chevrolet	21	0	electrical	9
29	25	63	J. J. Yeley (i)	MB Motorsports	Chevrolet	18	0	electrical	0
30	31	57	Mike Senica	Norm Benning Racing	Chevrolet	8	0	oil pressure	7
31	22	87	Joe Nemechek	NEMCO Motorsports	Chevrolet	7	0	vibration	6
32	32	42	Tommy Joe Martins (i)	Martins Motorsports	Chevrolet	3	0	crash	0
Official race results

== Standings after the race ==
Drivers' Championship standings

Pos	Driver	Points
1	Christopher Bell	3,135
2	Johnny Sauter	3,131 (-4)
3	Matt Crafton	3,104 (–31)
4	Austin Cindric	3,085 (–50)
5	Ben Rhodes	3,080 (–55)
6	John Hunter Nemechek	3,046 (–89)
7	Kaz Grala	2,158 (–977)
8	Chase Briscoe	2,158 (–977)
Official driver's standings

- Note: Only the first 8 positions are included for the driver standings.

Previous race: 2017 Texas Roadhouse 200	NASCAR Camping World Truck Series; 2017 season	Next race: 2017 Lucas Oil 150
