= 2017 Buckle Up in Your Truck 225 =

Tenth race of the 2017 NASCAR Camping World Truck Series

Race details
- Race 10 of 23 of the 2017 NASCAR Camping World Truck Series
- Date: July 6–7 2017
- Official name: 7th Annual Buckle Up in Your Truck 225
- Location: Sparta, Kentucky, Kentucky Speedway
- Course: Permanent racing facility
- Course length: 1.5 miles (2.41 km)
- Distance: 150 laps, 225 mi (362.102 km)
- Scheduled distance: 150 laps, 225 mi (362.102 km)
- Average speed: 112.703 miles per hour (181.378 km/h)

Pole position
Driver	Johnny Sauter	GMS Racing
- Time: Set by 2017 owner's points

Most laps led
Driver	Christopher Bell	Kyle Busch Motorsports
- Laps: 54

Winner
No. 4	Christopher Bell	Kyle Busch Motorsports

Television in the United States
- Network: Fox Sports 1
- Announcers: Vince Welch, Phil Parsons, Michael Waltrip

Radio in the United States
- Radio: Motor Racing Network

The 2017 Buckle Up in Your Truck 225 was the tenth stock car race of the 2017 NASCAR Camping World Truck Series and the seventh iteration of the event. The race was held throughout the days of July 6–7, 2017 due to rain delaying the race. The race was held in Sparta, Kentucky, at Kentucky Speedway, a 1.5-mile (2.41 km) tri-oval speedway. The race took the scheduled 150 laps to complete. At race's end, Christopher Bell, driving for Kyle Busch Motorsports, would come back from an early spin and fiercely defend the lead in the late stages of the race to win his fifth NASCAR Camping World Truck Series win and his third of the season. To fill out the podium, Brandon Jones of MDM Motorsports and Justin Haley of GMS Racing would finish second and third, respectively.

== Background ==
The layout of Kentucky Speedway. the venue where the race was held.

Kentucky Speedway is a 1.5-mile (2.4 km) tri-oval speedway in Sparta, Kentucky, which has hosted ARCA, NASCAR and Indy Racing League racing annually since it opened in 2000. The track is currently owned and operated by Speedway Motorsports, Inc. and Jerry Carroll, who, along with four other investors, owned Kentucky Speedway until 2008. The speedway has a grandstand capacity of 117,000. Construction of the speedway began in 1998 and was completed in mid-2000. The speedway has hosted the Gander RV & Outdoors Truck Series, Xfinity Series, IndyCar Series, Indy Lights, and most recently, the NASCAR Cup Series beginning in 2011.

=== Entry list ===
- (R) denotes rookie driver.
- (i) denotes driver who is ineligible for series driver points.

#	Driver	Team	Make	Sponsor
0	Tommy Regan*	Jennifer Jo Cobb Racing	Chevrolet	Driven 2 Honor
1	Jordan Anderson	TJL Motorsports	Chevrolet	Bommarito Automotive Group, LTi Printing
02	Austin Hill	Young's Motorsports	Ford	Whitetail Heaven Outfitters
4	Christopher Bell	Kyle Busch Motorsports	Toyota	Toyota
6	Norm Benning	Norm Benning Racing	Chevrolet	Norm Benning Racing
8	John Hunter Nemechek	NEMCO Motorsports	Chevrolet	Fire Alarm Services
10	Jennifer Jo Cobb	Jennifer Jo Cobb Racing	Chevrolet	Driven 2 Honor
13	Cody Coughlin (R)	ThorSport Racing	Toyota	JEGS
16	Ryan Truex	Hattori Racing Enterprises	Toyota	Aisin
18	Noah Gragson (R)	Kyle Busch Motorsports	Toyota	Switch
19	Austin Cindric (R)	Brad Keselowski Racing	Ford	LTi Printing, GRPI
21	Johnny Sauter	GMS Racing	Chevrolet	Allegiant Air
22	Austin Wayne Self	AM Racing	Toyota	Snap Track, Airflotek
24	Justin Haley (R)	GMS Racing	Chevrolet	Fraternal Order of Eagles
27	Ben Rhodes	ThorSport Racing	Toyota	Safelite Auto Glass
29	Chase Briscoe (R)	Brad Keselowski Racing	Ford	Cooper-Standard
33	Kaz Grala (R)	GMS Racing	Chevrolet	15-40 Connection
44	Matt Mills	Faith Motorsports	Chevrolet	Thompson Electric
45	T. J. Bell	Niece Motorsports	Chevrolet	Black Rifle Coffee Company
46	Kyle Busch (i)	Kyle Busch Motorsports	Toyota	Banfield Pet Hospital
49	Wendell Chavous (R)	Premium Motorsports	Chevrolet	Premium Motorsports
50	Josh Reaume	Beaver Motorsports	Chevrolet	Lodestar Guidance
51	Todd Gilliland	Kyle Busch Motorsports	Toyota	Liberty Tax
52	Stewart Friesen (R)	Halmar Friesen Racing	Chevrolet	Halmar
57	B. J. McLeod (i)	Norm Benning Racing	Chevrolet	Norm Benning Racing
63	Camden Murphy	MB Motorsports	Chevrolet	MB Motorsports
66	Ross Chastain (i)	Bolen Motorsports	Chevrolet	Bolen Motorsports
75	Parker Kligerman	Henderson Motorsports	Toyota	Food Country USA, Tide Pods
83	J. J. Yeley (i)	Copp Motorsports	Chevrolet	Fr8Auctions
87	Joe Nemechek	NEMCO Motorsports	Chevrolet	D. A. B. Constructors, Inc.
88	Matt Crafton	ThorSport Racing	Toyota	Menards, Jack Link's
92	Regan Smith	RBR Enterprises	Ford	BTS Tire & Wheel Distributors, Advance Auto Parts
98	Grant Enfinger (R)	ThorSport Racing	Toyota	RIDE TV
99	Brandon Jones (i)	MDM Motorsports	Chevrolet	Chigo
Official entry list

*Withdrew due to the #0 entry not having a good chance of qualifying if qualifying was rained out.

== Practice ==
=== First practice ===
The first practice session was held on Wednesday, July 3, at 3:00 PM EST, and would last for an hour and 25 minutes. Grant Enfinger of ThorSport Racing would set the fastest time in the session, with a lap of 29.667 and an average speed of 182.020 miles per hour (292.933 km/h).

Pos.	#	Driver	Team	Make	Time	Speed
1	98	Grant Enfinger (R)	ThorSport Racing	Toyota	29.667	182.020
2	46	Kyle Busch (i)	Kyle Busch Motorsports	Toyota	29.743	181.555
3	99	Brandon Jones (i)	MDM Motorsports	Chevrolet	29.767	181.409
Full first practice results

=== Second and final practice ===
The second and final practice session, sometimes referred to as Happy Hour, was held on Wednesday, July 3, at 5:00 PM EST, and would last for an hour and 25 minutes. Kyle Busch of Kyle Busch Motorsports would set the fastest time in the session, with a lap of 29.853 and an average speed of 180.886 miles per hour (291.108 km/h).

Pos.	#	Driver	Team	Make	Time	Speed
1	46	Kyle Busch (i)	Kyle Busch Motorsports	Toyota	29.853	180.886
2	4	Christopher Bell	Kyle Busch Motorsports	Toyota	29.869	180.789
3	33	Kaz Grala (R)	GMS Racing	Chevrolet	29.886	180.687
Full Happy Hour practice results

== Qualifying ==
Qualifying was scheduled to be held on Thursday, July 6, at 5:00 PM EST. However, qualifying was canceled due to inclement weather. As a result, the starting lineup was determined by the rulebook. As a result, GMS Racing driver Johnny Sauter would earn the pole.

Joe Nemechek was the only driver to fail to qualify.

=== Full starting lineup ===
Pos.	#	Driver	Team	Make
1	21	Johnny Sauter	GMS Racing	Chevrolet
2	4	Christopher Bell	Kyle Busch Motorsports	Toyota
3	29	Chase Briscoe (R)	Brad Keselowski Racing	Ford
4	88	Matt Crafton	ThorSport Racing	Toyota
5	27	Ben Rhodes	ThorSport Racing	Toyota
6	51	Myatt Snider	Kyle Busch Motorsports	Toyota
7	98	Grant Enfinger (R)	ThorSport Racing	Toyota
8	16	Ryan Truex	Hattori Racing Enterprises	Toyota
9	8	John Hunter Nemechek	NEMCO Motorsports	Chevrolet
10	24	Justin Haley (R)	GMS Racing	Chevrolet
11	18	Noah Gragson (R)	Kyle Busch Motorsports	Toyota
12	33	Kaz Grala (R)	GMS Racing	Chevrolet
13	19	Austin Cindric (R)	Brad Keselowski Racing	Ford
14	13	Cody Coughlin (R)	ThorSport Racing	Toyota
15	66	Ross Chastain (i)	Bolen Motorsports	Chevrolet
16	99	Brandon Jones (i)	MDM Motorsports	Chevrolet
17	6	Norm Benning	Norm Benning Racing	Chevrolet
18	02	Austin Hill	Young's Motorsports	Ford
19	45	T. J. Bell	Niece Motorsports	Chevrolet
20	92	Regan Smith	RBR Enterprises	Ford
21	49	Wendell Chavous (R)	Premium Motorsports	Chevrolet
22	10	Jennifer Jo Cobb	Jennifer Jo Cobb Racing	Chevrolet
23	50	Josh Reaume	Beaver Motorsports	Chevrolet
24	1	Jordan Anderson	TJL Motorsports	Chevrolet
25	83	J. J. Yeley (i)	Copp Motorsports	Chevrolet
26	63	Camden Murphy	MB Motorsports	Chevrolet
27	46	Kyle Busch (i)	Kyle Busch Motorsports	Toyota
28	44	Matt Mills	Faith Motorsports	Chevrolet
29	52	Stewart Friesen (R)	Halmar Friesen Racing	Chevrolet
30	75	Parker Kligerman	Henderson Motorsports	Toyota
31	57	B. J. McLeod (i)	Norm Benning Racing	Chevrolet
32	22	Austin Wayne Self	AM Racing	Toyota
Failed to qualify or withdrew
33	87	Joe Nemechek	NEMCO Motorsports	Chevrolet
WD	0	Tommy Regan	Jennifer Jo Cobb Racing	Chevrolet
Official starting lineup

== Race results ==
Stage 1 Laps: 35

Pos.	#	Driver	Team	Make	Pts
1	27	Ben Rhodes	ThorSport Racing	Toyota	10
2	16	Ryan Truex	Hattori Racing Enterprises	Toyota	9
3	88	Matt Crafton	ThorSport Racing	Toyota	8
4	98	Grant Enfinger (R)	ThorSport Racing	Toyota	7
5	8	John Hunter Nemechek	NEMCO Motorsports	Chevrolet	6
6	24	Justin Haley (R)	GMS Racing	Chevrolet	5
7	33	Kaz Grala (R)	GMS Racing	Chevrolet	4
8	66	Ross Chastain (i)	Bolen Motorsports	Chevrolet	0
9	18	Noah Gragson (R)	Kyle Busch Motorsports	Toyota	2
10	02	Austin Hill	Young's Motorsports	Ford	1

Stage 2 Laps: 35

Pos.	#	Driver	Team	Make	Pts
1	18	Noah Gragson (R)	Kyle Busch Motorsports	Toyota	10
2	46	Kyle Busch (i)	Kyle Busch Motorsports	Toyota	0
3	24	Justin Haley (R)	GMS Racing	Chevrolet	8
4	29	Chase Briscoe (R)	Brad Keselowski Racing	Ford	7
5	51	Myatt Snider	Kyle Busch Motorsports	Toyota	6
6	4	Christopher Bell	Kyle Busch Motorsports	Toyota	5
7	19	Austin Cindric (R)	Brad Keselowski Racing	Ford	4
8	21	Johnny Sauter	GMS Racing	Chevrolet	3
9	33	Kaz Grala (R)	GMS Racing	Chevrolet	2
10	8	John Hunter Nemechek	NEMCO Motorsports	Chevrolet	1

Stage 3 Laps: 80

Fin	St	#	Driver	Team	Make	Laps	Led	Status	Pts
1	2	4	Christopher Bell	Kyle Busch Motorsports	Toyota	150	54	running	45
2	16	99	Brandon Jones (i)	MDM Motorsports	Chevrolet	150	0	running	0
3	10	24	Justin Haley (R)	GMS Racing	Chevrolet	150	4	running	47
4	13	19	Austin Cindric (R)	Brad Keselowski Racing	Ford	150	0	running	37
5	11	18	Noah Gragson (R)	Kyle Busch Motorsports	Toyota	150	32	running	44
6	27	46	Kyle Busch (i)	Kyle Busch Motorsports	Toyota	150	0	running	0
7	30	75	Parker Kligerman	Henderson Motorsports	Toyota	150	0	running	30
8	4	88	Matt Crafton	ThorSport Racing	Toyota	150	0	running	37
9	1	21	Johnny Sauter	GMS Racing	Chevrolet	150	26	running	31
10	18	02	Austin Hill	Young's Motorsports	Ford	150	0	running	28
11	3	29	Chase Briscoe (R)	Brad Keselowski Racing	Ford	150	0	running	33
12	29	52	Stewart Friesen (R)	Halmar Friesen Racing	Chevrolet	150	0	running	25
13	15	66	Ross Chastain (i)	Bolen Motorsports	Chevrolet	150	0	running	0
14	20	92	Regan Smith	RBR Enterprises	Ford	150	0	running	23
15	14	13	Cody Coughlin (R)	ThorSport Racing	Toyota	150	0	running	22
16	6	51	Myatt Snider	Kyle Busch Motorsports	Toyota	149	4	running	27
17	25	83	J. J. Yeley (i)	Copp Motorsports	Chevrolet	149	0	running	0
18	9	8	John Hunter Nemechek	NEMCO Motorsports	Chevrolet	148	20	running	26
19	21	49	Wendell Chavous (R)	Premium Motorsports	Chevrolet	145	0	running	18
20	23	50	Josh Reaume	Beaver Motorsports	Chevrolet	144	0	running	17
21	22	10	Jennifer Jo Cobb	Jennifer Jo Cobb Racing	Chevrolet	142	0	running	16
22	32	22	Austin Wayne Self	AM Racing	Toyota	130	0	running	15
23	8	16	Ryan Truex	Hattori Racing Enterprises	Toyota	114	0	crash	23
24	12	33	Kaz Grala (R)	GMS Racing	Chevrolet	114	0	crash	19
25	24	1	Jordan Anderson	TJL Motorsports	Chevrolet	62	0	suspension	12
26	19	45	T. J. Bell	Niece Motorsports	Chevrolet	54	0	crash	11
27	5	27	Ben Rhodes	ThorSport Racing	Toyota	41	5	crash	20
28	7	98	Grant Enfinger (R)	ThorSport Racing	Toyota	41	5	crash	16
29	28	44	Matt Mills	Faith Motorsports	Chevrolet	20	0	crash	8
30	26	63	Camden Murphy	MB Motorsports	Chevrolet	10	0	electrical	7
31	31	57	B. J. McLeod (i)	Norm Benning Racing	Chevrolet	1	0	overheating	0
32	17	6	Norm Benning	Norm Benning Racing	Chevrolet	0	0	engine	5
Failed to qualify or withdrew
33		87	Joe Nemechek	NEMCO Motorsports	Chevrolet				
WD		0	Tommy Regan	Jennifer Jo Cobb Racing	Chevrolet				
Official race results

== Standings after the race ==
Drivers' Championship standings

Pos	Driver	Points
1	Johnny Sauter	464
2	Christopher Bell	436 (-28)
3	Chase Briscoe	390 (–74)
4	Matt Crafton	375 (–89)
5	Ben Rhodes	330 (–134)
6	Grant Enfinger	316 (–148)
7	Ryan Truex	315 (–149)
8	John Hunter Nemechek	306 (–158)
Official driver's standings

- Note: Only the first 8 positions are included for the driver standings.

Previous race: 2017 M&M's 200	NASCAR Camping World Truck Series; 2017 season	Next race: 2017 Eldora Dirt Derby
