= Ted Minor =

American stock racing driver (born 1974)

- Born: Ted D. Minor; February 1, 1974 (age 52); Weatherford, Texas, U.S.

NASCAR FedEx Freight Truck Series career
- 7 races run over 2 years
- 2019 position: 114th
- Best finish: 47th (2017)
- First race: 2014 Drivin' for Linemen 200 (Gateway)
- Last race: 2017 Lucas Oil 150 (Phoenix)
| Wins | Top tens | Poles |
|---|---|---|
| 0 | 0 | 0 |
- Statistics up to date as of July 9, 2020.

Ted D. Minor (born February 1, 1974) is an American professional stock car racing driver. He last competed part-time in the NASCAR Gander Outdoors Truck Series, driving the No. 25 Chevrolet Silverado for self-owned Ted Minor Motorsports.

== Racing career ==
Minor started his racing career in 2001 on Texas dirt tracks and has progressed to racing on asphalt tracks in the ARCA, USST series, and super late models.

Minor's first stock car start came in the ARCA Racing Series in 2010 driving the No. 89 for Lafferty Motorsports at Salem, but he crashed after 70 laps and finished 25th. It is to date his only ARCA attempt.

Minor has made seven starts in the NASCAR's Truck Series. He attempted to make his debut at the spring Martinsville race in 2014 for Cefalia Motorsports but the team withdrew after the first practice. His debut came at Gateway driving for that same team. finishing 25th. He returned again for Cefalia at Chicagoland finishing 31st. Minor returned in the following race at New Hampshire now start and parking the No. 57 Chevrolet Silverado for Norm Benning Racing and finished 30th. He was going to attempt the Iowa race in 2015 for Cefalia but the team withdrew. After almost two year-hiatus, Minor returned in 2017 driving for newly formed team: Long Motorsports. He drove for them at Iowa and Chicagoland. Minor returned at Texas driving the No. 44 for Faith Motorsports with sponsorship from SMD (Shawn Magee Design and the truck also feature a special tribute graphic on the deck lid honoring all 58 people who lost their lives in the tragic shootings at the Route 91 Harvest Festival in Las Vegas on October 1). and he tied his best finish of 25th-place. Minor returned in the following race at Phoenix with the same sponsorship but now driving the No. 63 truck for MB Motorsports and finished 31st.

In June 2019, Minor returned to the Truck Series for the SpeedyCash.com 400 at Texas, driving the No. 25 for self-owned Ted Minor Motorsports. He failed to qualify. He attempted to race at Chicagoland but he withdrew.

== Motorsports career results ==
=== NASCAR ===
(key) (Bold – Pole position awarded by qualifying time. Italics – Pole position earned by points standings or practice time. * – Most laps led.)

==== Gander Outdoors Truck Series ====
NASCAR Gander Outdoors Truck Series results
| Year | Team | No. | Make | 1 | 2 | 3 | 4 | 5 | 6 | 7 | 8 | 9 | 10 | 11 | 12 | 13 | 14 | 15 | 16 | 17 | 18 | 19 | 20 | 21 | 22 | 23 | NGOTC | Pts | Ref |
|---|---|---|---|---|---|---|---|---|---|---|---|---|---|---|---|---|---|---|---|---|---|---|---|---|---|---|---|---|---|
| 2014 | Cefalia Motorsports | 12 | Chevy | DAY | MAR; Wth | KAN | CLT | DOV | TEX | GTW; 25 | KEN | IOW | ELD | POC | MCH | BRI | MSP | CHI; 31 | | | | | | | | | 65th | 32 | |
| 2014 | Norm Benning Racing | 57 | Chevy | | | | | | | | | | | | | | | | NHA; 30 | LVS | TAL | MAR | TEX | PHO | HOM | | 65th | 32 | |
| 2017 | Long Motorsports | 14 | Chevy | DAY | ATL | MAR | KAN | CLT | DOV | TEX | GTW | IOW; 27 | KEN | ELD | POC | MCH | BRI | MSP | CHI; 26 | NHA | LVS | TAL | MAR | | | | 47th | 39 | |
| 2017 | Faith Motorsports | 44 | Chevy | | | | | | | | | | | | | | | | | | | | | TEX; 25 | | | 47th | 39 | |
| 2017 | MB Motorsports | 63 | Chevy | | | | | | | | | | | | | | | | | | | | | | PHO; 31 | HOM | 47th | 39 | |
| 2019 | Ted Minor Motorsports | 25 | Chevy | DAY | ATL | LVS | MAR | TEX | DOV | KAN | CLT | TEX; DNQ | IOW | GTW | CHI | KEN | POC | ELD | MCH | BRI | MSP | LVS | TAL | MAR | PHO | HOM | 114th | - | |

=== ARCA Racing Series ===
(key) (Bold – Pole position awarded by qualifying time. Italics – Pole position earned by points standings or practice time. * – Most laps led.)

ARCA Racing Series results
| Year | Team | No. | Make | 1 | 2 | 3 | 4 | 5 | 6 | 7 | 8 | 9 | 10 | 11 | 12 | 13 | 14 | 15 | 16 | 17 | 18 | 19 | 20 | ARSC | Pts | Ref |
|---|---|---|---|---|---|---|---|---|---|---|---|---|---|---|---|---|---|---|---|---|---|---|---|---|---|---|
| 2010 | Lafferty Motorsports | 89 | Chevy | DAY | PBE | SLM; 25 | TEX | TAL | TOL | POC | MCH | IOW | MFD | POC | BLN | NJE | ISF | CHI | DSF | TOL | SLM | KAN | CAR | 118th | 105 | |

^{*} Season still in progress
