= Kevin Donahue =

American racing driver (born 1994)

- Born: Kevin J. Donahue; October 4, 1994 (age 32); Chesterfield, Missouri, U.S.

NASCAR FedEx Freight Truck Series career
- 12 races run over 4 years
- 2020 position: 61st
- Best finish: 39th (2017)
- First race: 2016 Texas Roadhouse 200 (Martinsville)
- Last race: 2020 e.p.t. 200 (Kansas)
Wins	Top tens	Poles
0	0	0
- Statistics up to date as of November 11, 2020.

Kevin J. Donahue (born October 4, 1994) is an American professional stock car racing driver. He last competed part-time in the NASCAR Gander RV & Outdoors Truck Series, driving the Nos. 33 and 00 Toyota Tundras for Reaume Brothers Racing.

He is the older brother of fellow NASCAR driver Kyle Donahue.

== Racing career ==
In 2016, Donahue made his Camping World Truck Series debut along with his brother Kyle at the Texas Roadhouse 200 at Martinsville, driving the No. 07 truck for MB Motorsports. He started 29th and finished 30th due to engine problems. He also drove at Phoenix in the No. 71 truck for MB Motorsports, starting 26th and finishing 20th.

In 2017, Donahue returned for five races, driving the Nos. 63 and 36 trucks for MB Motorsports. He finished 21st at Kansas, 27th in Fort Worth, 26th at Gateway, 28th at Iowa, and 29th in Chicago.

In 2018, Donahue drove the No. 63 truck for MB Motorsports at Martinsville and Kansas, finishing 30th and 32nd.

After a two-year absence, Donahue returned to the Truck Series in July 2020, running both races of the doubleheader at Kansas Speedway for Reaume Brothers Racing, driving the No. 33 in the Friday race and the No. 00 in the Saturday race.

== Motorsports career results ==
=== NASCAR ===
(key) (Bold – Pole position awarded by qualifying time. Italics – Pole position earned by points standings or practice time. * – Most laps led.)

==== Gander RV & Outdoors Truck Series ====
NASCAR Gander RV & Outdoors Truck Series results
Year	Team	No.	Make	1	2	3	4	5	6	7	8	9	10	11	12	13	14	15	16	17	18	19	20	21	22	23	NGTC	Pts	Ref
2016	MB Motorsports	07	Chevy	DAY	ATL	MAR	KAN	DOV	CLT	TEX	IOW	GTW	KEN	ELD	POC	BRI	MCH	MSP	CHI	NHA	LVS	TAL	MAR; 30	TEX			61st	16	
2016	MB Motorsports	71	Chevy																						PHO; 20	HOM	61st	16	
2017	MB Motorsports	63	Chevy	DAY	ATL	MAR	KAN; 21	CLT	DOV	TEX; 27									CHI; 29	NHA	LVS	TAL	MAR	TEX	PHO	HOM	39th	54	
2017	MB Motorsports	36	Chevy								GTW; 26	IOW; 28	KEN	ELD	POC	MCH	BRI	MSP									39th	54	
2018	Copp Motorsports	63	Chevy	DAY	ATL	LVS	MAR; 30	DOV																			56th	37	
2018	MB Motorsports	63	Chevy						KAN; 32	CLT	TEX	IOW	GTW; 12	CHI	KEN	ELD	POC	MCH	BRI	MSP	LVS	TAL	MAR	TEX	PHO	HOM	56th	37	
2020	Reaume Brothers Racing	33	Toyota	DAY	LVS	CLT	ATL	HOM	POC	KEN	TEX	KAN; 38	KAN; 23	MCH	DAY	DOV	GTW	DAR	RCH	BRI	LVS	TAL	KAN	TEX	MAR	PHO	61st	19	

^{*} Season still in progress
