= Donnie Levister =

American racing driver

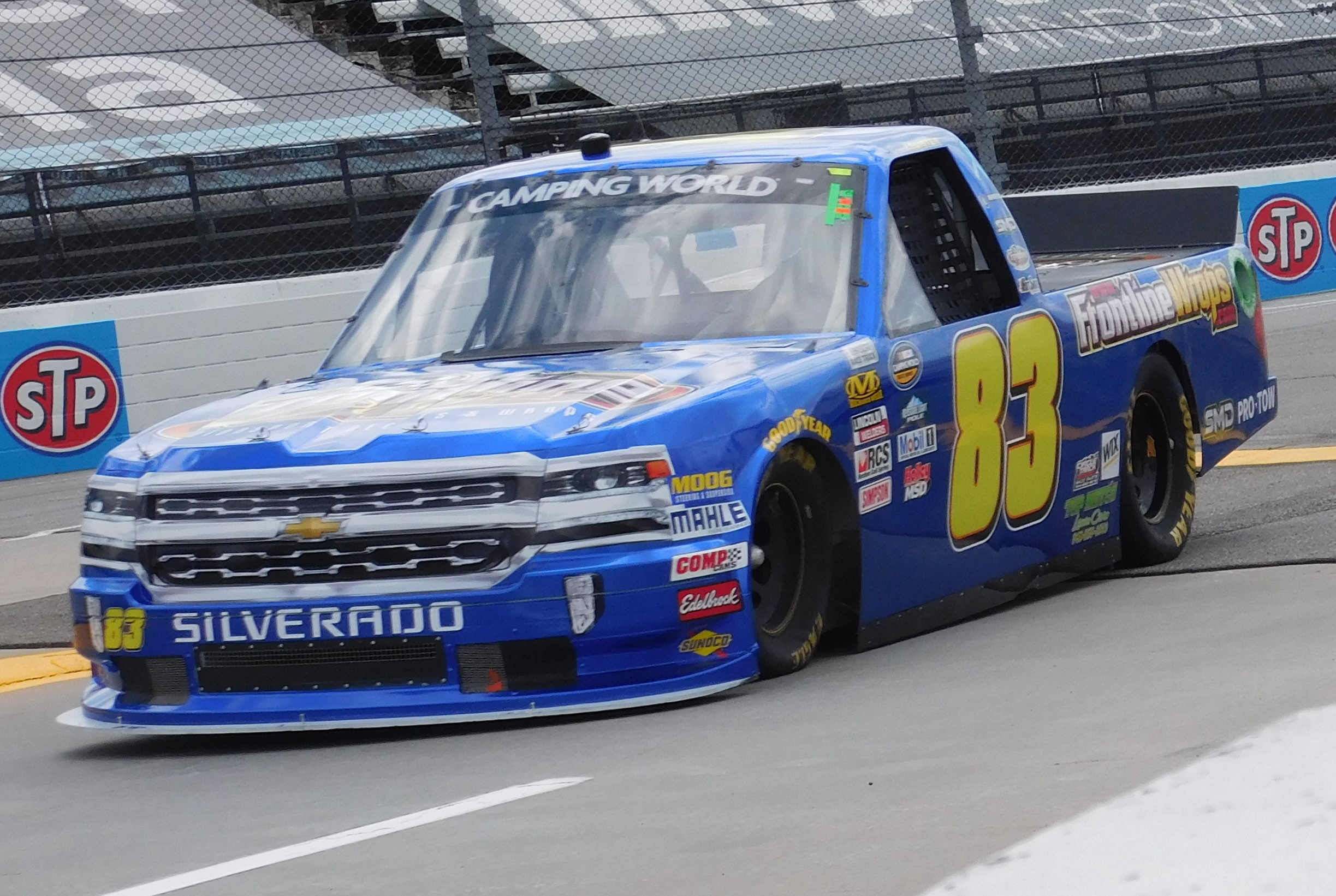
- Levister's No. 83 truck at Martinsville Speedway in 2017
- Born: April 19, 1976 (age 50); Winnsboro, South Carolina

NASCAR FedEx Freight Truck Series career
- 2 races run over 1 year
- 2017 position: 62nd
- Best finish: 62nd (2017)
- First race: 2017 Alpha Energy Solutions 250 (Martinsville)
- Last race: 2017 Drivin' for Linemen 200 (Gateway)
Wins	Top tens	Poles
0	0	0
- Statistics up to date as of June 17, 2017.

Donnie Levister (born April 19, 1976) is an American professional stock car racing driver.

== Racing career ==
=== Early years ===
Levister began his racing career on dirt tracks near his hometown of Winnsboro, South Carolina.

=== Camping World Truck Series ===
Partnering with Faith Motorsports to try and make his first NASCAR race, Levister announced that he wanted to attempt at least 15 races of the 2016 NASCAR Camping World Truck Series schedule. In his first attempt, he was forced to withdraw at Martinsville Speedway and the team scaled back its schedule, later Faith Motorsports partner with Mike Harmon Racing and his No. 74 truck to be higher in owner points, but Levister failed to qualify in the same way at Iowa Speedway. The season did not get any better from there on out as two more withdrawals and failing to qualify for a race left Levister in search of his first series start at the end of 2016.

Levister found a ride for the 2017 Alpha Energy Solutions 250 at Martinsville with Copp Motorsports, a team new to the Truck series in 2017. Driving their No. 83 Chevrolet Silverado, Levister qualified 30th before falling out with brake problems after 100 laps, leading to a 30th-place finish. Meanwhile, after the Martinsville race Faith Motorsports purchased the No. 44 entry of Martins Motorsports and the team has hinted that Levister will drive the truck in future races; however Levister was ineligible to race in tracks with a length of more than 1.3 mile until Gateway, so Matt Mills replaced him at Kansas and Charlotte.

== Motorsports career results ==
=== NASCAR ===
(key) (Bold – Pole position awarded by qualifying time. Italics – Pole position earned by points standings or practice time. * – Most laps led.)

==== Camping World Truck Series ====
NASCAR Camping World Truck Series results
Year	Team	No.	Make	1	2	3	4	5	6	7	8	9	10	11	12	13	14	15	16	17	18	19	20	21	22	23	NCWTC	Pts	Ref
2016	Faith Motorsports	74	Chevy	DAY	ATL	MAR	KAN	DOV	CLT	TEX	IOW; DNQ	GTW	KEN														113th	-	
2016	Faith Motorsports	62	Toyota											ELD; Wth	POC								MAR; DNQ	TEX	PHO	HOM	113th	-	
2016	Faith Motorsports	74	Ram													BRI; Wth	MCH	MSP	CHI	NHA	LVS	TAL					113th	-	
2017	Copp Motorsports	83	Chevy	DAY	ATL	MAR; 30	KAN	CLT	DOV	TEX																	62nd	19	
2017	Faith Motorsports	44	Chevy								GTW; 25	IOW	KEN	ELD	POC	MCH	BRI	MSP	CHI	NHA	LVS	TAL	MAR	TEX	PHO	HOM	62nd	19	

^{*} Season still in progress
^{1} Ineligible for series points
