= Kyle Donahue (racing driver) =

American racing driver (born 2000)

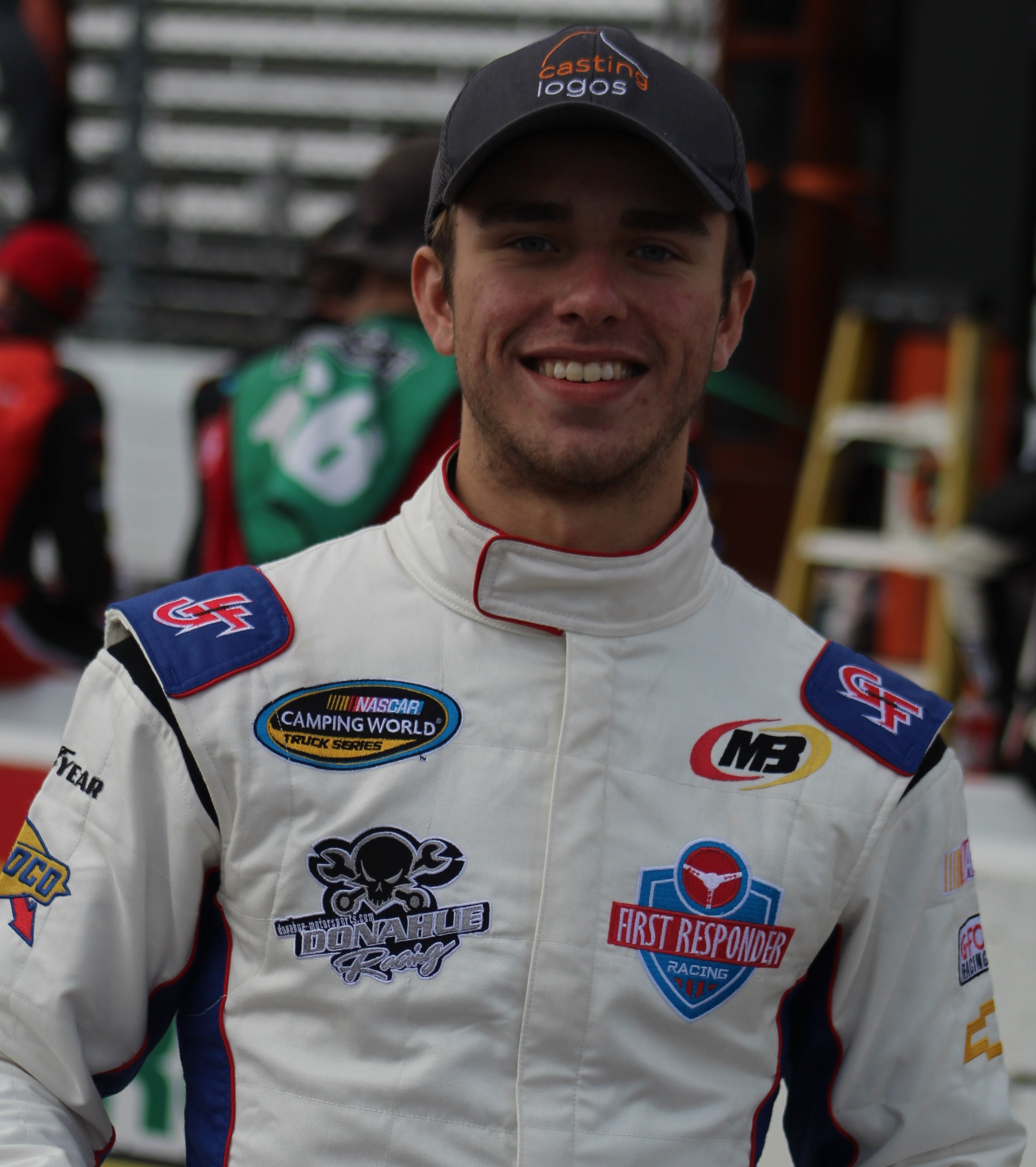
- Donahue at Martinsville Speedway in 2018
- Born: Kyle J. Donahue; May 6, 2000 (age 26); Chesterfield, Missouri, U.S.

NASCAR FedEx Freight Truck Series career
- 9 races run over 4 years
- 2020 position: 68th
- Best finish: 40th (2017)
- First race: 2016 Texas Roadhouse 200 (Martinsville)
- Last race: 2020 CarShield 200 (Gateway)
Wins	Top tens	Poles
0	0	0
- Statistics up to date as of November 11, 2020.

Kyle J. Donahue (born May 6, 2000) is an American professional stock car racing driver. He last competed part-time in the NASCAR Gander RV & Outdoors Truck Series, driving the No. 00 truck for Reaume Brothers Racing.

He is the younger brother of fellow NASCAR driver Kevin Donahue.

== Racing career ==
=== Truck Series ===
In 2016, Donahue made his Camping World Truck Series debut along with his brother Kevin at the Texas Roadhouse 200 at Martinsville, driving the No. 63 truck for MB Motorsports. He started 22nd and finished 31st due to a crash early in the race. This was Donahue's only start in 2016.

In 2017, Donahue returned for three races, driving the No. 63 truck for MB Motorsports. He finished sixteenth at Martinsville, sixteenth at Gateway, and 26th at Iowa.

In 2018, Donahue drove the No. 83 truck for Copp Motorsports at Martinsville. This time, he started 22nd and finished 23rd.

== Motorsports career results ==
=== NASCAR ===
(key) (Bold – Pole position awarded by qualifying time. Italics – Pole position earned by points standings or practice time. * – Most laps led.)

==== Gander RV & Outdoors Truck Series ====
NASCAR Gander RV & Outdoors Truck Series results
Year	Team	No.	Make	1	2	3	4	5	6	7	8	9	10	11	12	13	14	15	16	17	18	19	20	21	22	23	NGTC	Pts	Ref
2016	MB Motorsports	63	Chevy	DAY	ATL	MAR	KAN	DOV	CLT	TEX	IOW	GTW	KEN	ELD	POC	BRI	MCH	MSP	CHI	NHA	LVS	TAL	MAR; 31	TEX	PHO	HOM	75th	2	
2017	MB Motorsports	63	Chevy	DAY	ATL	MAR; 16	KAN	CLT	DOV	TEX	GTW; 16	IOW; 26	KEN	ELD	POC	MCH	BRI	MSP	CHI	NHA	LVS	TAL	MAR	TEX	PHO	HOM	40th	53	
2018	Copp Motorsports	83	Chevy	DAY	ATL	LVS	MAR; 23	DOV																			41st	55	
2018	MB Motorsports	83	Chevy						KAN; 20	CLT																	41st	55	
2018	Copp Motorsports	63	Chevy								TEX; 28	IOW	GTW	CHI	KEN	ELD	POC	MCH	BRI	MSP	LVS	TAL					41st	55	
2018	MB Motorsports	63	Chevy																				MAR; 22	TEX	PHO	HOM	41st	55	
2020	Reaume Brothers Racing	00	Toyota	DAY	LVS	CLT	ATL	HOM	POC	KEN	TEX	KAN	KAN	MCH	DAY	DOV	GTW; 20	DAR	RCH	BRI	LVS	TAL	KAN	TEX	MAR	PHO	68th	17	

^{*} Season still in progress
^{1} Ineligible for series points
