= JEGS Performance =

American automotive parts retailer

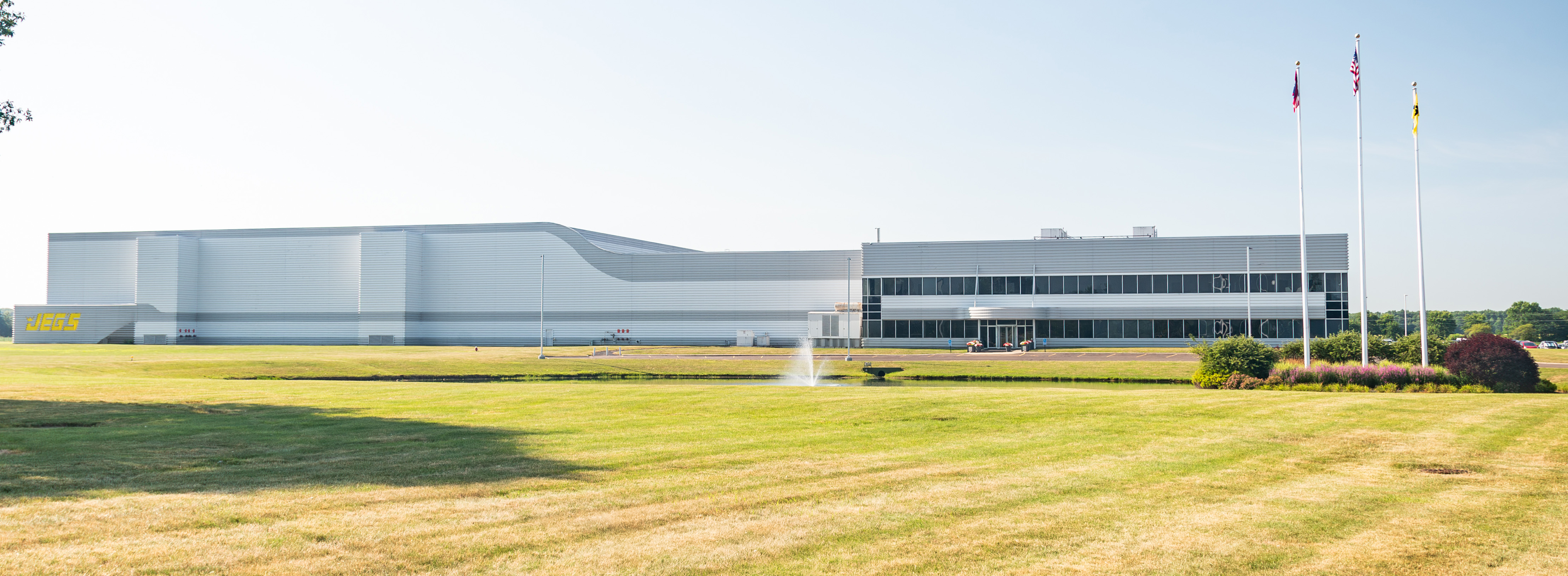
- JEGS Performance headquarters in Delaware, Ohio, photographed in 2025
- Industry: Automotive
- Founded: 1960
- Founder: Jeg Coughlin Sr.
- Headquarters: Delaware, Ohio, USA
- Parent: Greenbriar Equity Group
- Website: www.jegs.com

JEGS Performance is an American retailer and distributor of automotive performance parts and accessories.

== History ==
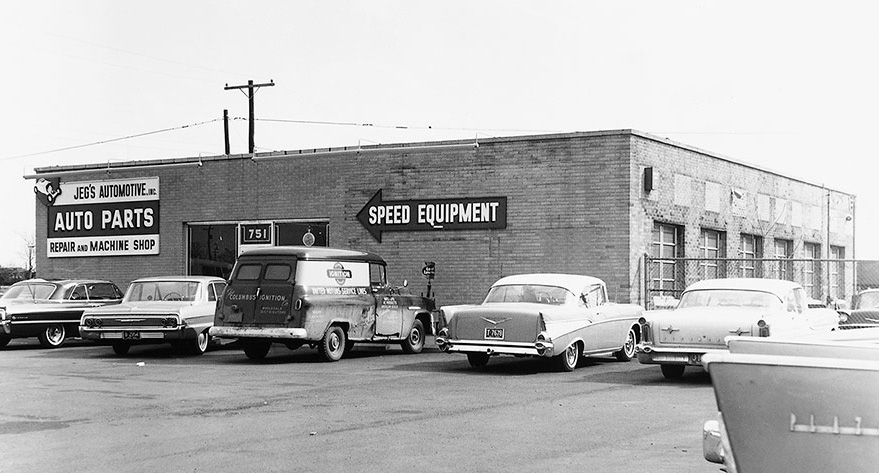
Original JEGS Performance building in Columbus, Ohio, photographed in the 1960s

The company was founded in 1960 by Jeg Coughlin Sr. in Columbus, Ohio. The company began as a small operation supplying high-performance automotive parts to local customers. As demand for aftermarket performance parts increased, the business expanded beyond its original location into a larger retail and mail-order operation, and became involved in motorsports and sponsorship in NHRA events. In February 2022, JEGS was acquired by Greenbriar Equity Group, for a reported $421 million.

== Racing ==
Team JEGS is the motorsports division of JEGS Performance, primarily involved in drag racing and competition within the NHRA.

The team has achieved NHRA championships and event victories across national and divisional competition. Jeg Coughlin Jr. and Troy Coughlin Jr., have competed in NHRA-sanctioned events as part of Team JEGS.

== Charitable contributions ==
The JEGS Foundation Racing for Cancer Research program raises money for, and contributes to, cancer research programs, including those at James Cancer Hospital and the Richard J. Solove Research Institute at Ohio State University.
