= Wendell Chavous =

American racing driver (born 1985)

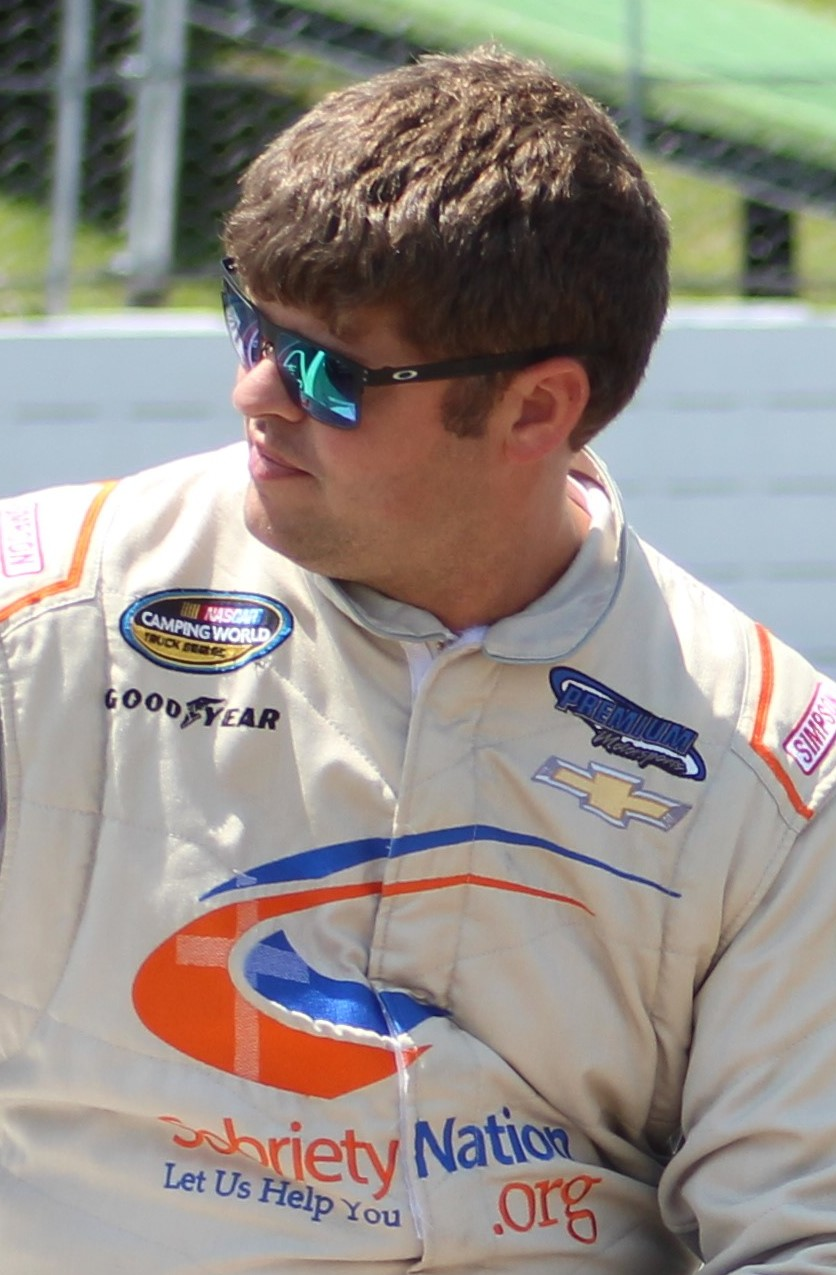
- Chavous at Pocono Raceway in 2018
- Born: Wendell Phillip Chavous Jr. February 28, 1985 (age 41); Hephzibah, Georgia, U.S.

NASCAR FedEx Freight Truck Series career
- 50 races run over 4 years
- 2018 position: 17th
- Best finish: 16th (2017)
- First race: 2014 Kroger 200 (Martinsville)
- Last race: 2018 Fr8Auctions 250 (Talladega)
Wins	Top tens	Poles
0	1	0
- Statistics up to date as of November 16, 2018.

Wendell Phillip Chavous Jr. (born February 28, 1985) is an American former professional stock car racing driver and current entrepreneur. He last competed part-time in the NASCAR Camping World Truck Series, driving both the Nos. 15 and 49 Chevrolet Silverados for Premium Motorsports. He has also driven for MAKE Motorsports and Mike Harmon Racing in the NCWTS.

Chavous is also the owner of Steel Barn Truss, a manufacturing business that makes barn trusses.

== Racing career ==
=== Early years ===
Chavous made a name racing late models on dirt tracks, including appearances at the Fastrak Grand Nationals.

=== Camping World Truck Series ===
Driving for Mike Harmon, Chavous made his first Truck start in the 2014 Kroger 200, starting last in the 36-truck field but making his way up to 27th. Two weeks later at Phoenix International Raceway, Chavous finished in the same spot in Harmon's No. 74, albeit more than 30 laps down. Switching to MAKE Motorsports for the season-ending Ford EcoBoost 200 a week later, Chavous fell out with electrical problems and finished 31st. After running sporadically in Premium Motorsports' No. 94 for the beginning part of 2015, the team and Chavous announced at Eldora Speedway that he would pilot the truck for the rest of the season. However, the deal fell through, with Chavous running only the next three races. His best finish was a sixteenth before the announcement at Kansas Speedway. He ran seven races on the season.

On February 13, 2017, Premium Motorsports announced that Chavous would compete for 2017 Truck Series Rookie of the Year driving the team's No. 49 entry. Chavous ran the full schedule, except Mosport and Phoenix where he was replaced by Gary Klutt, and Robby Lyons, respectively. He scored a career-best finish of 14th at Las Vegas Motor Speedway in the fall.

On January 29, 2018, it was announced that Chavous would return to Premium's No. 49 entry for another full-time effort in 2018. Brian Keselowski returned as crew chief. As part of the announcement, addiction help nonprofit Sobriety Nation signed on as sponsor for the entire season. The pairing yielded four top-fifteen efforts, up from one the previous year, although Keselowski departed the team in late spring. On October 8, 2018, Chavous announced his departure from Premium and NASCAR, effective following the October 14 race at Talladega Superspeedway, citing the need for more family time and business ventures as the reasons to step away. He ended his career with a fifth-place outing in the race.

== Personal life ==
Chavous is married and has a son, who races go-karts. He owns the business Steel Barn Truss, a barn truss manufacturing company.

== Motorsports career results ==
=== NASCAR ===
(key) (Bold – Pole position awarded by time. Italics – Pole position earned by points standings or practice time. * – Most laps led.)

==== Camping World Truck Series ====
NASCAR Camping World Truck Series results
Year	Team	No.	Make	1	2	3	4	5	6	7	8	9	10	11	12	13	14	15	16	17	18	19	20	21	22	23	NCWTC	Pts	Ref
2014	Mike Harmon Racing	74	Chevy	DAY	MAR	KAN	CLT	DOV	TEX	GTW	KEN	IOW	ELD	POC	MCH	BRI	MSP	CHI	NHA	LVS	TAL	MAR; 27	TEX	PHO; 27			53rd	47	
2014	MAKE Motorsports	50	Chevy																						HOM; 31		53rd	47	
2015	Premium Motorsports	94	Chevy	DAY	ATL; 24	MAR; DNQ	KAN; 16	CLT; 25	DOV	TEX	GTW	IOW	KEN	ELD; 26	POC; 25	MCH; 23	BRI; 26	MSP	CHI	NHA	LVS	TAL	MAR	TEX	PHO	HOM	31st	143	
2017	Premium Motorsports	49	Chevy	DAY; 19	ATL; 20	MAR; 23	KAN; 31	CLT; 28	DOV; 19	TEX; 20	GTW; 18	IOW; 17	KEN; 19	ELD; 16	POC; 20	MCH; 17	BRI; 23	MSP	CHI; 18	NHA; 18	LVS; 14	TAL; 24	MAR; 21	TEX; 21	PHO		16th	348	
2017	Premium Motorsports	15	Chevy																							HOM; 23	16th	348	
2018	Premium Motorsports	49	Chevy	DAY; 12	ATL; 23	LVS; 14	MAR; 18	DOV; 17	KAN; 27	CLT; 22	TEX; 12	IOW; 21	GTW; 15	CHI; 22	KEN; 24	ELD; 23	POC; 21	MCH; 16	BRI; 23		LVS; 28	TAL; 5	MAR	TEX	PHO	HOM	17th	336	
2018	Premium Motorsports	15	Chevy																	MSP; 24							17th	336	

==== K&N Pro Series West ====
NASCAR K&N Pro Series West results
Year	Team	No.	Make	1	2	3	4	5	6	7	8	9	10	11	12	13	14	NKNPSWC	Pts	Ref
2014	Mike Holleran	38	Chevy	PHO	IRW	S99	IOW	KCR	SON	SLS	CNS	IOW	EVG	KCR	MMP	AAS	PHO; 21	78th	23	

^{*} Season still in progress
^{1} Ineligible for series driver points
