= Faith Motorsports (Truck Series team) =

NASCAR Truck Series team

- Owner(s): Shane Lamb
- Base: Lugoff, South Carolina
- Series: Camping World Truck Series
- Race drivers: 44. Matt Mills (part-time)
- Manufacturer: Chevrolet
- Opened: 2015

Career
- Debut: 2017 Toyota Tundra 250 (Kansas)
- Latest race: 2017 Drivin' for Linemen 200 (Gateway)
- Races competed: Total: 20; Whelen All-American Series: 16; Camping World Truck Series: 4
- Drivers' Championships: Total: 0 Whelen All-American Series: 0 Camping World Truck Series: 0
- Race victories: Total: 0 Whelen All-American Series: 0 Camping World Truck Series: 0
- Pole positions: Total: 0 Whelen All-American Series: 0 Camping World Truck Series: 0

Faith Motorsports were an American professional stock car racing team that competed in the NASCAR Camping World Truck Series and Whelen All-American Series. The team was owned by Shane Lamb, and fielded entries for Matt Mills and Donnie Levister.

== History ==
In 2014, owner Shane Lamb signs dirt-track veteran, Donnie Levister for the 2015 Whelen All-American Series South Carolina State Championship. Levister was born in Winnsboro, South Carolina, and he was making the transition to stock car racing. Levister would be contending in the series under the Faith Motorsports banner and would contend for rookie of the year.

== NASCAR Whelen All-American Series ==
=== Car No. 22 History ===
In 2015, Levister competed in the NASCAR Whelen All-American Series South Carolina State Championship in the No. 22 Chevrolet sponsored by Property Pros, based in Kansas City, for 16 races. It was a solid season for Levister, scoring 1 top 5 and 8 top 10s. He finished 476th in the country, 23rd in the state of South Carolina. Levister even got a few rookie of the year nominations, but in the end, he didn't win the award. Levister gained co-ownership of Faith Motorsports after the season. On December 4, 2015, Levister and Lamb announced the formation of their new Camping World Truck Series team. They planned to run the full season in a Toyota Tundra, and in the process, they would suspend operations for their Whelen All-American Series team.

== NASCAR Camping World Truck Series ==
=== Truck No. 44 History ===
While in search for their first series start, owner Shane Lamb acquired the owner points of the No. 44 for Martins Motorsports after round 3 of the season at Martinsville. Martins' team would be focusing on the Xfinity Series from now on. The team wanted to start racing with Donnie Levister right away with Shane Lamb listed as the owner, but NASCAR would not approve due to Levister's lack of experience. Lamb And Levister also switched back to Chevrolet after running a Toyota last season. As a result, the team hired Matt Mills to drive before Levister would be eligible. Mills competed at Kansas, Charlotte, and Dover. Mills was running at the finish in all events finishing 17th, 24th, and 17th. The team planned to enter Texas with Mills, but they later withdrew. The team had hinted that Donnie Levister would attempt to run at Gateway and future races, but Levister and Lamb parted ways after Gateway, and the team did not attempt another race.

=== Truck No. 62 History ===
In early 2016, the team announced they would run a Toyota full-time for Donnie Levister with sponsorship from Property Pro's and Shawn Magee Design. However, after not entering Daytona or Atlanta, and withdrawing from Martinsville, the team scaled back to a part-time schedule. The team initially wanted to be No. 22 but however AM Racing acquire rights of the No. 22, so they instead chose the No. 62. The team returned at the 11th race at Eldora with Levister, but they withdrew before practicing. They returned for the 20th race at Martinsville, again with Levister. After qualifying 35th out of 36 trucks, they failed to qualify.

=== Truck No. 74 history ===
At the 8th race of the 2016 season at Iowa, Faith Motorsports partnered with Mike Harmon Racing to get them higher in owner points. They ran a Chevrolet for this attempt. Mike Harmon would be listed as the owner, but they would run under the Faith Motorsports banner. Levister qualified 31st out of 33, but he didn't have enough owner points, so he failed to qualify. The partnership returned at the 13th race at Bristol with Levister in a RAM, but the team withdrew.
