= 2017 WinstarOnlineGaming.com 400 =

Seventh race of the 2017 NASCAR Camping World Truck Series

Race details
- Race 7 of 23 of the 2017 NASCAR Camping World Truck Series
- Date: June 9, 2017
- Official name: 21st Annual WinstarOnlineGaming.com 400
- Location: Fort Worth, Texas, Texas Motor Speedway
- Course: Permanent racing facility
- Course length: 1.5 miles (2.41 km)
- Distance: 167 laps, 250.5 mi (403.14 km)
- Scheduled distance: 167 laps, 250.5 mi (403.14 km)
- Average speed: 119.412 miles per hour (192.175 km/h)

Pole position
Driver	Noah Gragson	Kyle Busch Motorsports
- Time: 29.168

Most laps led
Driver	Christopher Bell	Kyle Busch Motorsports
- Laps: 92

Winner
No. 4	Christopher Bell	Kyle Busch Motorsports

Television in the United States
- Network: Fox Sports 1
- Announcers: Vince Welch, Phil Parsons, Todd Bodine

Radio in the United States
- Radio: Motor Racing Network

The 2017 WinstarOnlineGaming.com 400 was the seventh stock car race of the 2017 NASCAR Camping World Truck Series and the 15th iteration of the event. The race was held on Friday, June 9, 2017, in Fort Worth, Texas at Texas Motor Speedway, a 1.5 miles (2.4 km) permanent quad-oval racetrack. The race took the scheduled 167 laps to complete. At race's end, Christopher Bell, driving for Kyle Busch Motorsports, would edge eventual second-place finisher, Brad Keselowski Racing driver Chase Briscoe, under caution when Timothy Peters would suffer a wild wreck on the final lap of the race, forcing a caution. The win was Bell's fourth career NASCAR Camping World Truck Series win and his second of the season. To fill out the podium, Grant Enfinger of ThorSport Racing would finish third.

== Background ==
The layout of Texas Motor Speedway, the venue where the race was held.

Texas Motor Speedway is a speedway located in the northernmost portion of the U.S. city of Fort Worth, Texas – the portion located in Denton County, Texas. The track measures 1.5 miles (2.4 km) around and is banked 24 degrees in the turns, and is of the oval design, where the front straightaway juts outward slightly. The track layout is similar to Atlanta Motor Speedway and Charlotte Motor Speedway (formerly Lowe's Motor Speedway). The track is owned by Speedway Motorsports, Inc., the same company that owns Atlanta and Charlotte Motor Speedway, as well as the short-track Bristol Motor Speedway.

=== Entry list ===
- (R) denotes rookie driver.
- (i) denotes driver who is ineligible for series driver points.

#	Driver	Team	Make	Sponsor
0	Tommy Regan	Jennifer Jo Cobb Racing	Chevrolet	Driven 2 Honor
1	Jordan Anderson	TJL Motorsports	Chevrolet	Knight Fire Protection
02	Austin Hill	Young's Motorsports	Ford	Randco, Young's Building Systems
4	Christopher Bell	Kyle Busch Motorsports	Toyota	JBL
6	Norm Benning	Norm Benning Racing	Chevrolet	Norm Benning Racing
8	John Hunter Nemechek	NEMCO Motorsports	Chevrolet	Romco Equipment Co., RPS
10	Jennifer Jo Cobb	Jennifer Jo Cobb Racing	Chevrolet	Driven 2 Honor
13	Cody Coughlin (R)	ThorSport Racing	Toyota	RIDE TV
16	Ryan Truex	Hattori Racing Enterprises	Toyota	H-E-B
18	Noah Gragson (R)	Kyle Busch Motorsports	Toyota	Switch
19	Austin Cindric (R)	Brad Keselowski Racing	Ford	Reese Brands, Draw-Tite
21	Johnny Sauter	GMS Racing	Chevrolet	Allegiant Air
22	Austin Wayne Self	AM Racing	Toyota	Don't Mess with Texas
24	Justin Haley (R)	GMS Racing	Chevrolet	Allegiant Air
27	Ben Rhodes	ThorSport Racing	Toyota	Safelite Auto Glass
29	Chase Briscoe (R)	Brad Keselowski Racing	Ford	Cooper-Standard
33	Kaz Grala (R)	GMS Racing	Chevrolet	Kiklos
45	T. J. Bell	Niece Motorsports	Chevrolet	SilencerCo, Black Rifle Coffee Company
49	Wendell Chavous (R)	Premium Motorsports	Chevrolet	Premium Motorsports
50	Josh Reaume	Beaver Motorsports	Chevrolet	Motorsports Safety Group, Lodestar Guidance
51	Myatt Snider	Kyle Busch Motorsports	Toyota	Louisiana Hot Sauce
52	Stewart Friesen (R)	Halmar Friesen Racing	Chevrolet	Halmar
63	Kevin Donahue	MB Motorsports	Chevrolet	MB Motorsports
66	Travis Kvapil	Bolen Motorsports	Chevrolet	Xcalibur Pit School
83	Todd Peck	Copp Motorsports	Chevrolet	Copp Motorsports
88	Matt Crafton	ThorSport Racing	Toyota	Menards, Hormel Gatherings
98	Grant Enfinger (R)	ThorSport Racing	Toyota	JIVE Communications
99	Timothy Peters	MDM Motorsports	Chevrolet	Metabo
Official entry list

== Practice ==
=== First practice ===
The first practice session was held on Thursday, June 8, at 3:00 PM CST, and would last for 55 minutes. Christopher Bell of Kyle Busch Motorsports would set the fastest time in the session, with a lap of 29.528 and an average speed of 182.877 miles per hour (294.312 km/h).

Pos.	#	Driver	Team	Make	Time	Speed
1	4	Christopher Bell	Kyle Busch Motorsports	Toyota	29.528	182.877
2	21	Johnny Sauter	GMS Racing	Chevrolet	29.552	182.729
3	27	Ben Rhodes	ThorSport Racing	Toyota	29.784	181.305
Full first practice results

=== Second practice ===
The second practice session was held on Thursday, June 8, at 5:00 PM CST, and would last for 55 minutes. Christopher Bell of Kyle Busch Motorsports would set the fastest time in the session, with a lap of 29.142 and an average speed of 185.300 miles per hour (298.211 km/h).

Pos.	#	Driver	Team	Make	Time	Speed
1	4	Christopher Bell	Kyle Busch Motorsports	Toyota	29.142	185.300
2	98	Grant Enfinger (R)	ThorSport Racing	Toyota	29.247	184.634
3	21	Johnny Sauter	GMS Racing	Chevrolet	29.349	183.993
Full second practice results

=== Third and final practice ===
The third and final practice session, sometimes referred to as Happy Hour, was held on Thursday, June 8, at 7:00 PM CST, and would last for 55 minutes. Christopher Bell of Kyle Busch Motorsports would set the fastest time in the session, with a lap of 29.142 and an average speed of 185.300 miles per hour (298.211 km/h), completing a sweep of all three sessions.

Pos.	#	Driver	Team	Make	Time	Speed
1	4	Christopher Bell	Kyle Busch Motorsports	Toyota	29.035	185.982
2	21	Johnny Sauter	GMS Racing	Chevrolet	29.123	185.420
3	27	Ben Rhodes	ThorSport Racing	Toyota	29.192	184.982
Full Happy Hour practice results

== Qualifying ==
Qualifying was held on Friday, June 9, at 4:35 PM CST. Since Texas Motor Speedway is at least a 1.5 miles (2.4 km) racetrack, the qualifying system was a single car, single lap, two round system where in the first round, everyone would set a time to determine positions 13–32. Then, the fastest 12 qualifiers would move on to the second round to determine positions 1–12.

Noah Gragson of Kyle Busch Motorsports would win the pole, setting a lap of 29.168 and an average speed of 185.134 miles per hour (297.944 km/h) in the second round.

No drivers would fail to qualify.

=== Full qualifying results ===
Pos.	#	Driver	Team	Make	Time (R1)	Speed (R1)	Time (R2)	Speed (R2)
1	18	Noah Gragson (R)	Kyle Busch Motorsports	Toyota			29.168	185.134
2	21	Johnny Sauter	GMS Racing	Chevrolet			29.171	185.115
3	88	Matt Crafton	ThorSport Racing	Toyota			29.249	184.622
4	16	Ryan Truex	Hattori Racing Enterprises	Toyota			29.314	184.212
5	98	Grant Enfinger (R)	ThorSport Racing	Toyota			29.396	183.698
6	33	Kaz Grala (R)	GMS Racing	Chevrolet			29.407	183.630
7	27	Ben Rhodes	ThorSport Racing	Toyota			29.463	183.281
8	8	John Hunter Nemechek	NEMCO Motorsports	Chevrolet			29.582	182.543
9	19	Austin Cindric (R)	Brad Keselowski Racing	Ford			29.718	181.708
10	24	Justin Haley (R)	GMS Racing	Chevrolet			29.756	181.476
11	13	Cody Coughlin (R)	ThorSport Racing	Toyota			29.760	181.452
12	29	Chase Briscoe (R)	Brad Keselowski Racing	Ford			29.912	180.530
Eliminated in Round 1
13	51	Myatt Snider	Kyle Busch Motorsports	Toyota	29.738	181.586	-	-
14	99	Timothy Peters	MDM Motorsports	Chevrolet	29.866	180.808	-	-
15	22	Austin Wayne Self	AM Racing	Toyota	29.917	180.499	-	-
16	66	Travis Kvapil	Bolen Motorsports	Chevrolet	29.980	180.120	-	-
17	02	Tyler Young	Young's Motorsports	Chevrolet	29.999	180.006	-	-
18	52	Stewart Friesen (R)	Halmar Friesen Racing	Chevrolet	30.037	179.778	-	-
19	1	Jordan Anderson	TJL Motorsports	Chevrolet	30.357	177.883	-	-
20	63	Kevin Donahue	MB Motorsports	Chevrolet	31.145	173.383	-	-
21	4	Christopher Bell	Kyle Busch Motorsports	Toyota	31.598	170.897	-	-
22	45	T. J. Bell	Niece Motorsports	Chevrolet	32.186	167.775	-	-
23	49	Wendell Chavous (R)	Premium Motorsports	Chevrolet	32.674	165.269	-	-
24	83	Todd Peck	Copp Motorsports	Chevrolet	32.785	164.709	-	-
25	10	Jennifer Jo Cobb	Jennifer Jo Cobb Racing	Chevrolet	32.865	164.309	-	-
26	6	Norm Benning	Norm Benning Racing	Chevrolet	33.485	161.266	-	-
27	0	Tommy Regan	Jennifer Jo Cobb Racing	Chevrolet	33.508	161.156	-	-
Qualified by owner's points
28	50	Josh Reaume	Beaver Motorsports	Chevrolet	41.413	130.394	-	-
Official starting lineup

== Race results ==
Stage 1 Laps: 40

Pos.	#	Driver	Team	Make	Pts
1	21	Johnny Sauter	GMS Racing	Chevrolet	10
2	4	Christopher Bell	Kyle Busch Motorsports	Toyota	9
3	88	Matt Crafton	ThorSport Racing	Toyota	8
4	98	Grant Enfinger (R)	ThorSport Racing	Toyota	7
5	8	John Hunter Nemechek	NEMCO Motorsports	Chevrolet	6
6	29	Chase Briscoe (R)	Brad Keselowski Racing	Ford	5
7	16	Ryan Truex	Hattori Racing Enterprises	Toyota	4
8	18	Noah Gragson (R)	Kyle Busch Motorsports	Toyota	3
9	33	Kaz Grala (R)	GMS Racing	Chevrolet	2
10	13	Cody Coughlin (R)	ThorSport Racing	Toyota	1

Stage 2 Laps: 40

Pos.	#	Driver	Team	Make	Pts
1	4	Christopher Bell	Kyle Busch Motorsports	Toyota	10
2	29	Chase Briscoe (R)	Brad Keselowski Racing	Ford	9
3	21	Johnny Sauter	GMS Racing	Chevrolet	8
4	8	John Hunter Nemechek	NEMCO Motorsports	Chevrolet	7
5	33	Kaz Grala (R)	GMS Racing	Chevrolet	6
6	16	Ryan Truex	Hattori Racing Enterprises	Toyota	5
7	98	Grant Enfinger (R)	ThorSport Racing	Toyota	4
8	18	Noah Gragson (R)	Kyle Busch Motorsports	Toyota	3
9	24	Justin Haley (R)	GMS Racing	Chevrolet	2
10	27	Ben Rhodes	ThorSport Racing	Toyota	1

Stage 3 Laps: 87

Fin	St	#	Driver	Team	Make	Laps	Led	Status	Pts
1	21	4	Christopher Bell	Kyle Busch Motorsports	Toyota	167	92	running	59
2	12	29	Chase Briscoe (R)	Brad Keselowski Racing	Ford	167	7	running	49
3	5	98	Grant Enfinger (R)	ThorSport Racing	Toyota	167	0	running	45
4	4	16	Ryan Truex	Hattori Racing Enterprises	Toyota	167	0	running	42
5	7	27	Ben Rhodes	ThorSport Racing	Toyota	167	0	running	33
6	10	24	Justin Haley (R)	GMS Racing	Chevrolet	167	0	running	33
7	1	18	Noah Gragson (R)	Kyle Busch Motorsports	Toyota	167	13	running	36
8	2	21	Johnny Sauter	GMS Racing	Chevrolet	167	49	running	47
9	3	88	Matt Crafton	ThorSport Racing	Toyota	167	6	running	36
10	6	33	Kaz Grala (R)	GMS Racing	Chevrolet	167	0	running	35
11	16	66	Travis Kvapil	Bolen Motorsports	Chevrolet	167	0	running	26
12	15	22	Austin Wayne Self	AM Racing	Toyota	166	0	crash	25
13	14	99	Timothy Peters	MDM Motorsports	Chevrolet	166	0	crash	24
14	22	45	T. J. Bell	Niece Motorsports	Chevrolet	165	0	running	23
15	19	1	Jordan Anderson	TJL Motorsports	Chevrolet	163	0	running	22
16	13	51	Myatt Snider	Kyle Busch Motorsports	Toyota	160	0	crash	21
17	26	6	Norm Benning	Norm Benning Racing	Chevrolet	157	0	running	20
18	11	13	Cody Coughlin (R)	ThorSport Racing	Toyota	153	0	engine	20
19	25	10	Jennifer Jo Cobb	Jennifer Jo Cobb Racing	Chevrolet	150	0	running	18
20	23	49	Wendell Chavous (R)	Premium Motorsports	Chevrolet	143	0	electrical	17
21	8	8	John Hunter Nemechek	NEMCO Motorsports	Chevrolet	137	0	crash	29
22	18	52	Stewart Friesen (R)	Halmar Friesen Racing	Chevrolet	116	0	crash	15
23	17	02	Tyler Young	Young's Motorsports	Chevrolet	111	0	engine	14
24	24	83	Todd Peck	Copp Motorsports	Chevrolet	39	0	vibration	13
25	9	19	Austin Cindric (R)	Brad Keselowski Racing	Ford	28	0	crash	12
26	28	50	Josh Reaume	Beaver Motorsports	Chevrolet	12	0	engine	11
27	20	63	Kevin Donahue	MB Motorsports	Chevrolet	9	0	electrical	10
28	27	0	Tommy Regan	Jennifer Jo Cobb Racing	Chevrolet	5	0	electrical	9
Official race results

== Standings after the race ==
Drivers' Championship standings

Pos	Driver	Points
1	Johnny Sauter	338
2	Christopher Bell	298 (-40)
3	Matt Crafton	268 (–70)
4	Chase Briscoe	257 (–81)
5	Ben Rhodes	248 (–90)
6	Ryan Truex	227 (–111)
7	Grant Enfinger	226 (–112)
8	Kaz Grala	210 (–128)
Official driver's standings

- Note: Only the first 8 positions are included for the driver standings.

Previous race: 2017 Bar Harbor 200	NASCAR Camping World Truck Series; 2017 season	Next race: 2017 Drivin' for Linemen 200
