= 2017 Fred's 250 =

19th race of the 2017 NASCAR Camping World Truck Series

2017 Fred's 250 powered by Coca-Cola
Race details
- Race 19 of 23 of the 2017 NASCAR Camping World Truck Series
- Date: October 14, 2017
- Official name: 12th Annual Fred's 250
- Location: Lincoln, Alabama, Talladega Superspeedway
- Course: Permanent racing facility
- Course length: 2.66 miles (4.28 km)
- Distance: 95 laps, 252.7 mi (406.681 km)
- Scheduled distance: 94 laps, 250.4 mi (402.4 km)
- Average speed: 129.258 miles per hour (208.021 km/h)

Pole position
Driver	Christopher Bell	Kyle Busch Motorsports
- Time: 53.165

Most laps led
Driver	Johnny Sauter	GMS Racing
- Laps: 39

Winner
No. 75	Parker Kligerman	Henderson Motorsports

Television in the United States
- Network: Fox
- Announcers: Vince Welch, Kevin Harvick, Michael Waltrip

Radio in the United States
- Radio: Motor Racing Network

The 2017 Fred's 250 powered by Coca-Cola was the 19th stock car race of the 2017 NASCAR Camping World Truck Series, the third race of the 2017 NASCAR Camping World Truck Series playoffs, the third and final race of the Round of 8, and the 12th iteration of the event. The race was held on Saturday, October 14, 2017, in Lincoln, Alabama at Talladega Superspeedway, a 2.66 miles (4.28 km) permanent D-shaped superspeedway. The race was extended from 94 laps to 95 laps, due to a NASCAR overtime finish. At race's end, Parker Kligerman, driving for Henderson Motorsports, took advantage of the lead on the final restart, and earned his second career NASCAR Camping World Truck Series win, after a caution came out on the final lap. To fill out the podium, Christopher Bell and Myatt Snider of Kyle Busch Motorsports would finish second and third, respectively.

Christopher Bell, Johnny Sauter, Matt Crafton, Ben Rhodes, Austin Cindric, and John Hunter Nemechek would advance into the Round of 6.

== Background ==
The layout of Talladega Superspeedway, the venue where the race was held.

The race was held at Talladega Superspeedway, which is a motorsports complex located north of Talladega, Alabama. It is located on the former Anniston Air Force Base in the small city of Lincoln. A tri-oval, the track was constructed in 1969 by the International Speedway Corporation, a business controlled by the France Family. As of 2021, the track hosts the NASCAR Cup Series, NASCAR Xfinity Series, NASCAR Camping World Truck Series, and ARCA Menards Series. Talladega is the longest NASCAR oval, with a length of 2.66 miles (4.281 km), compared to the Daytona International Speedway, which is 2.5 miles (4.0 km) long. The total peak capacity of Talladega is around 175,000 spectators, with the main grandstand capacity being about 80,000.

=== Entry list ===
- (R) denotes rookie driver.
- (i) denotes driver who is ineligible for series driver points

#	Driver	Team	Make	Sponsor
1	Mike Harmon (i)	Mike Harmon Racing	Chevrolet	Mike Harmon Racing
02	Tyler Young	Young's Motorsports	Chevrolet	Randco Industries, Young's Building Systems
4	Christopher Bell	Kyle Busch Motorsports	Toyota	Toyota "Let's Go Places"
6	Norm Benning	Norm Benning Racing	Chevrolet	H&H Transport
8	John Hunter Nemechek	NEMCO Motorsports	Chevrolet	Fire Alarm Services
10	Jennifer Jo Cobb	Jennifer Jo Cobb Racing	Chevrolet	VG Pride Group, Driven2Honor.org
13	Cody Coughlin (R)	ThorSport Racing	Toyota	Ride TV, Jegs
15	D. J. Kennington (i)	Premium Motorsports	Chevrolet	Losers Bar & Grill
16	Ryan Truex	Hattori Racing Enterprises	Toyota	Bass Pro Shops, Tracker Boats
18	Noah Gragson (R)	Kyle Busch Motorsports	Toyota	Switch
19	Austin Cindric (R)	Brad Keselowski Racing	Ford	LTi Printing
21	Johnny Sauter	GMS Racing	Chevrolet	Allegiant Air
24	Justin Haley (R)	GMS Racing	Chevrolet	Fraternal Order of Eagles
27	Ben Rhodes	ThorSport Racing	Toyota	Safelite
29	Chase Briscoe (R)	Brad Keselowski Racing	Ford	Cooper Standard
33	Kaz Grala (R)	GMS Racing	Chevrolet	Stealth
45	Austin Wayne Self	Niece Motorsports	Chevrolet	AM Technical Solutions
47	Chris Fontaine	Glenden Enterprises	Toyota	Glenden Enterprises
49	Wendell Chavous (R)	Premium Motorsports	Chevrolet	Vydox Plus
50	Josh Reaume	Beaver Motorsports	Chevrolet	Ever-Fi
51	Myatt Snider	Kyle Busch Motorsports	Toyota	Louisiana Hot Sauce
52	Stewart Friesen (R)	Halmar Friesen Racing	Chevrolet	Halmar International "We Build America"
63	Bobby Gerhart	Bobby Gerhart Racing	Chevrolet	Lucas Oil
66	Vinnie Miller (i)	Bolen Motorsports	Chevrolet	Master Manufacturing
68	Clay Greenfield	Clay Greenfield Motorsports	Chevrolet	Titan Paint Sprayers
75	Parker Kligerman	Henderson Motorsports	Toyota	Tide Pods, Food Country USA
83	Spencer Boyd	Copp Motorsports	Chevrolet	Grunt Style
87	Joe Nemechek	NEMCO Motorsports	Chevrolet	D. A. B. Constructors
88	Matt Crafton	ThorSport Racing	Toyota	Hormel Gatherings, Menards
92	Regan Smith	RBR Enterprises	Ford	Black's Tire Service, Advance Auto Parts
98	Grant Enfinger (R)	ThorSport Racing	Toyota	Champion Power Equipment, Curb Records
Official entry list

== Practice ==
=== First practice ===
The first practice session was held on Friday, October 13, at 11:00 AM CST. The session would last for 55 minutes. Cody Coughlin of ThorSport Racing would set the fastest time in the session, with a lap of 49.948 and an average speed of 191.719 mph (308.542 km/h).

Pos.	#	Driver	Team	Make	Time	Speed
1	13	Cody Coughlin (R)	ThorSport Racing	Toyota	49.948	191.719
2	8	John Hunter Nemechek	NEMCO Motorsports	Chevrolet	50.068	191.260
3	92	Regan Smith	RBR Enterprises	Ford	50.263	190.518
Full first practice results

=== Final practice ===
The final practice session was held on Friday, October 13, at 1:00 PM CST. The session would last for 55 minutes. Chris Fontaine of Glenden Enterprises would set the fastest time in the session, with a lap of 50.964 and an average speed of 187.897 mph (302.391 km/h).

Pos.	#	Driver	Team	Make	Time	Speed
1	47	Chris Fontaine	Glenden Enterprises	Toyota	50.964	187.897
2	52	Stewart Friesen (R)	Halmar Friesen Racing	Chevrolet	50.981	187.835
3	98	Grant Enfinger (R)	ThorSport Racing	Toyota	51.001	187.761
Full final practice results

== Qualifying ==
Qualifying was held on Saturday, October 14, at 9:30 AM CST. Since Talladega Superspeedway is at least 1.5 miles (2.4 km), the qualifying system was a single car, single lap, two round system where in the first round, everyone would set a time to determine positions 13–32. Then, the fastest 12 qualifiers would move on to the second round to determine positions 1–12.

Christopher Bell of Kyle Busch Motorsports would win the pole, setting a lap of 53.165 and an average speed of 180.118 mph (289.872 km/h).

=== Full qualifying results ===
Pos.	#	Driver	Team	Make	Time (R1)	Speed (R1)	Time (R2)	Speed (R2)
1	4	Christopher Bell	Kyle Busch Motorsports	Toyota	-*	-*	53.165	180.118
2	21	Johnny Sauter	GMS Racing	Chevrolet	-*	-*	53.489	179.027
3	52	Stewart Friesen (R)	Halmar Friesen Racing	Chevrolet	-*	-*	53.571	178.753
4	24	Justin Haley (R)	GMS Racing	Chevrolet	-*	-*	53.741	178.188
5	29	Chase Briscoe (R)	Brad Keselowski Racing	Ford	-*	-*	53.867	177.771
6	19	Austin Cindric (R)	Brad Keselowski Racing	Ford	-*	-*	53.932	177.557
7	16	Ryan Truex	Hattori Racing Enterprises	Toyota	-*	-*	54.001	177.330
8	18	Noah Gragson (R)	Kyle Busch Motorsports	Toyota	-*	-*	54.100	177.006
9	51	Myatt Snider	Kyle Busch Motorsports	Toyota	-*	-*	54.127	176.917
10	27	Ben Rhodes	ThorSport Racing	Toyota	-*	-*	54.137	176.885
11	88	Matt Crafton	ThorSport Racing	Toyota	-*	-*	54.535	175.594
12	33	Kaz Grala (R)	GMS Racing	Chevrolet	-*	-*	-	-
Eliminated in Round 1
13	98	Grant Enfinger (R)	ThorSport Racing	Toyota	54.017	177.245	-	-
14	75	Parker Kligerman	Henderson Motorsports	Toyota	54.135	176.891	-	-
15	8	John Hunter Nemechek	NEMCO Motorsports	Chevrolet	54.225	176.598	-	-
16	68	Clay Greenfield	Clay Greenfield Motorsports	Chevrolet	54.272	176.445	-	-
17	47	Chris Fontaine	Glenden Enterprises	Toyota	54.379	176.097	-	-
18	13	Cody Coughlin (R)	ThorSport Racing	Toyota	54.458	175.842	-	-
19	02	Tyler Young	Young's Motorsports	Chevrolet	54.792	174.770	-	-
20	45	Austin Wayne Self	Niece Motorsports	Chevrolet	54.902	174.420	-	-
21	87	Joe Nemechek	NEMCO Motorsports	Chevrolet	55.004	174.096	-	-
22	92	Regan Smith	RBR Enterprises	Ford	55.021	174.043	-	-
23	15	D. J. Kennington (i)	Premium Motorsports	Chevrolet	55.051	173.948	-	-
24	66	Vinnie Miller (i)	Bolen Motorsports	Chevrolet	55.256	173.302	-	-
25	63	Bobby Gerhart	Bobby Gerhart Racing	Chevrolet	55.312	173.127	-	-
26	49	Wendell Chavous (R)	Premium Motorsports	Chevrolet	55.638	172.113	-	-
27	83	Spencer Boyd	Copp Motorsports	Chevrolet	56.659	169.011	-	-
Qualified by owner's points
28	1	Mike Harmon (i)	Mike Harmon Racing	Chevrolet	57.293	167.141	-	-
29	10	Jennifer Jo Cobb	Jennifer Jo Cobb Racing	Chevrolet	57.493	166.559	-	-
30	50	Josh Reaume	Beaver Motorsports	Chevrolet	59.525	160.874	-	-
31	6	Norm Benning	Norm Benning Racing	Chevrolet	-	-	-	-
Official qualifying results
Official starting lineup

*Time unavailable.

== Race results ==
Stage 1 Laps: 20

Pos.	#	Driver	Team	Make	Pts
1	21	Johnny Sauter	GMS Racing	Chevrolet	10
2	24	Justin Haley (R)	GMS Racing	Chevrolet	9
3	4	Christopher Bell	Kyle Busch Motorsports	Toyota	8
4	52	Stewart Friesen (R)	Halmar Friesen Racing	Chevrolet	7
5	51	Myatt Snider	Kyle Busch Motorsports	Toyota	6
6	88	Matt Crafton	ThorSport Racing	Toyota	5
7	8	John Hunter Nemechek	NEMCO Motorsports	Chevrolet	4
8	27	Ben Rhodes	ThorSport Racing	Toyota	3
9	13	Cody Coughlin (R)	ThorSport Racing	Toyota	2
10	75	Parker Kligerman	Henderson Motorsports	Toyota	1

Stage 2 Laps: 20

Pos.	#	Driver	Team	Make	Pts
1	21	Johnny Sauter	GMS Racing	Chevrolet	10
2	24	Justin Haley (R)	GMS Racing	Chevrolet	9
3	51	Myatt Snider	Kyle Busch Motorsports	Toyota	8
4	19	Austin Cindric (R)	Brad Keselowski Racing	Ford	7
5	88	Matt Crafton	ThorSport Racing	Toyota	6
6	52	Stewart Friesen (R)	Halmar Friesen Racing	Chevrolet	5
7	8	John Hunter Nemechek	NEMCO Motorsports	Chevrolet	4
8	13	Cody Coughlin (R)	ThorSport Racing	Toyota	3
9	27	Ben Rhodes	ThorSport Racing	Toyota	2
10	98	Grant Enfinger (R)	ThorSport Racing	Toyota	1

Stage 3 Laps: 55

Fin	St	#	Driver	Team	Make	Laps	Led	Status	Pts
1	14	75	Parker Kligerman	Henderson Motorsports	Toyota	95	3	Running	41
2	1	4	Christopher Bell	Kyle Busch Motorsports	Toyota	95	9	Running	43
3	9	51	Myatt Snider	Kyle Busch Motorsports	Toyota	95	1	Running	48
4	13	98	Grant Enfinger (R)	ThorSport Racing	Toyota	95	17	Running	34
5	6	19	Austin Cindric (R)	Brad Keselowski Racing	Ford	95	3	Running	39
6	15	8	John Hunter Nemechek	NEMCO Motorsports	Chevrolet	95	0	Running	39
7	24	66	Vinnie Miller (i)	Bolen Motorsports	Chevrolet	95	0	Running	0
8	16	68	Clay Greenfield	Clay Greenfield Motorsports	Chevrolet	95	1	Running	29
9	11	88	Matt Crafton	ThorSport Racing	Toyota	95	0	Running	39
10	19	02	Tyler Young	Young's Motorsports	Chevrolet	95	0	Running	27
11	25	63	Bobby Gerhart	Bobby Gerhart Racing	Chevrolet	95	0	Running	26
12	2	21	Johnny Sauter	GMS Racing	Chevrolet	95	39	Running	45
13	27	83	Spencer Boyd	Copp Motorsports	Chevrolet	95	0	Running	0
14	8	18	Noah Gragson (R)	Kyle Busch Motorsports	Toyota	95	0	Running	23
15	23	15	D. J. Kennington (i)	Premium Motorsports	Chevrolet	95	1	Running	0
16	4	24	Justin Haley (R)	GMS Racing	Chevrolet	94	10	Running	39
17	3	52	Stewart Friesen (R)	Halmar Friesen Racing	Chevrolet	94	0	Running	32
18	20	45	Austin Wayne Self	Niece Motorsports	Chevrolet	94	0	Running	19
19	29	10	Jennifer Jo Cobb	Jennifer Jo Cobb Racing	Chevrolet	93	0	Running	18
20	28	1	Mike Harmon (i)	Mike Harmon Racing	Chevrolet	90	0	Running	0
21	30	50	Josh Reaume	Beaver Motorsports	Chevrolet	90	0	Running	16
22	5	29	Chase Briscoe (R)	Brad Keselowski Racing	Ford	86	0	Running	15
23	10	27	Ben Rhodes	ThorSport Racing	Toyota	70	0	Accident	19
24	26	49	Wendell Chavous (R)	Premium Motorsports	Chevrolet	70	2	Accident	13
25	18	13	Cody Coughlin (R)	ThorSport Racing	Toyota	70	9	Accident	17
26	17	47	Chris Fontaine	Glenden Enterprises	Toyota	70	0	Accident	11
27	22	92	Regan Smith	RBR Enterprises	Ford	53	0	Accident	10
28	7	16	Ryan Truex	Hattori Racing Enterprises	Toyota	19	0	Accident	9
29	12	33	Kaz Grala (R)	GMS Racing	Chevrolet	18	0	Accident	8
30	21	87	Joe Nemechek	NEMCO Motorsports	Chevrolet	2	0	Vibration	7
31	31	6	Norm Benning	Norm Benning Racing	Chevrolet	0	0	Engine	6
Official race results

== Standings after the race ==
Drivers' Championship standings

Pos	Driver	Points
1	Christopher Bell	2,195
2	Johnny Sauter	2,143 (-52)
3	Matt Crafton	2,140 (–55)
4	Ben Rhodes	2,124 (–71)
5	Austin Cindric	2,121 (–74)
6	John Hunter Nemechek	2,107 (–88)
7	Chase Briscoe	2,099 (–96)
8	Kaz Grala	2,082 (–113)
Official driver's standings

- Note: Only the first 8 positions are included for the driver standings.

Previous race: 2017 Las Vegas 350	NASCAR Camping World Truck Series; 2017 season	Next race: 2017 Texas Roadhouse 200
