= 2017 North Carolina Education Lottery 200 =

Fifth race of the 2017 NASCAR Camping World Truck Series

Race details
- Race 5 of 23 of the 2017 NASCAR Camping World Truck Series
- Date: May 19, 2017
- Official name: 15th Annual North Carolina Education Lottery 200
- Location: Concord, North Carolina, Charlotte Motor Speedway
- Course: Permanent racing facility
- Course length: 1.5 miles (2.41 km)
- Distance: 134 laps, 201 mi (323.478 km)
- Scheduled distance: 134 laps, 201 mi (323.478 km)
- Average speed: 110.103 miles per hour (177.194 km/h)

Pole position
Driver	Christopher Bell	Kyle Busch Motorsports
- Time: 29.852

Most laps led
Driver	Kyle Busch	Kyle Busch Motorsports
- Laps: 90

Winner
No. 51	Kyle Busch	Kyle Busch Motorsports

Television in the United States
- Network: Fox Sports 1
- Announcers: Vince Welch, Phil Parsons, Michael Waltrip

Radio in the United States
- Radio: Motor Racing Network

The 2017 North Carolina Education Lottery 200 was the fifth stock car race of the 2017 NASCAR Camping World Truck Series and the 15th iteration of the event. The race was held on Friday, May 19, 2017, in Concord, North Carolina at Charlotte Motor Speedway, a 1.5 miles (2.4 km) permanent quad-oval. The race took the scheduled 134 laps to complete. At race's end, Kyle Busch, driving for Kyle Busch Motorsports, would complete a dominant performance with a clutch restart with three to go to win his 48th career NASCAR Camping World Truck Series win and his second of the season. To fill out the podium, Johnny Sauter of GMS Racing and Christopher Bell of Kyle Busch Motorsports would finish second and third, respectively.

== Background ==
The layout of Charlotte Motor Speedway, the venue where the race was held.

The race was held at Charlotte Motor Speedway, located in Concord, North Carolina. The speedway complex includes a 1.5-mile (2.4 km) quad-oval track that was utilized for the race, as well as a dragstrip and a dirt track. The speedway was built in 1959 by Bruton Smith and is considered the home track for NASCAR with many race teams based in the Charlotte metropolitan area. The track is owned and operated by Speedway Motorsports Inc. (SMI) with Marcus G. Smith serving as track president.

=== Entry list ===
- (R) denotes rookie driver.
- (i) denotes driver who is ineligible for series driver points.

#	Driver	Team	Make	Sponsor
1	Jordan Anderson	TJL Motorsports	Chevrolet	Circle Track Warehouse
02	Austin Hill	Young's Motorsports	Ford	Young's Motorsports
4	Christopher Bell	Kyle Busch Motorsports	Toyota	SiriusXM
6	Norm Benning	Norm Benning Racing	Chevrolet	Norm Benning Racing
7	Brett Moffitt	Red Horse Racing	Toyota	Red Horse Racing
8	John Hunter Nemechek	NEMCO Motorsports	Chevrolet	Fire Alarm Services
10	Jennifer Jo Cobb	Jennifer Jo Cobb Racing	Chevrolet	Driven 2 Honor, Mark One Electric
12	Cody Ware (i)	Rick Ware Racing	Chevrolet	Motorsports Safety Group
13	Cody Coughlin (R)	ThorSport Racing	Toyota	RIDE TV
16	Ryan Truex	Hattori Racing Enterprises	Toyota	SeaWatch International, Bar Harbor
17	Timothy Peters	Red Horse Racing	Toyota	Red Horse Racing
18	Noah Gragson (R)	Kyle Busch Motorsports	Toyota	Switch
19	Austin Cindric (R)	Brad Keselowski Racing	Ford	LTi Printing
21	Johnny Sauter	GMS Racing	Chevrolet	Allegiant Air
22	Austin Wayne Self	AM Racing	Toyota	Snap-Track, AccuTech
24	Justin Haley (R)	GMS Racing	Chevrolet	Levine Children's Hospital
27	Ben Rhodes	ThorSport Racing	Toyota	Safelite Auto Glass
29	Chase Briscoe (R)	Brad Keselowski Racing	Ford	Cooper-Standard
33	Kaz Grala (R)	GMS Racing	Chevrolet	Outlaw Fasteners
44	Matt Mills (i)	Faith Motorsports	Chevrolet	Sparrow Ranch On The Island
45	T. J. Bell	Niece Motorsports	Chevrolet	SilencerCo, Black Rifle Coffee Company
49	Wendell Chavous (R)	Premium Motorsports	Chevrolet	Steel Barn Truss, Down South
50	Spencer Boyd	Beaver Motorsports	Chevrolet	Grunt Style "This We'll Defend"
51	Kyle Busch (i)	Kyle Busch Motorsports	Toyota	Cessna, Beechcraft
52	Stewart Friesen (R)	Halmar Friesen Racing	Chevrolet	Halmar
63	Todd Peck	MB Motorsports	Chevrolet	Pulse Transport Inc., Arthritis Foundation
66	Ross Chastain (i)	Bolen Motorsports	Chevrolet	South Carolina Gamecocks
75	Parker Kligerman	Henderson Motorsports	Toyota	Food Country USA
83	J. J. Yeley (i)	Copp Motorsports	Chevrolet	Nano Pro MT, UNOH
86	Brandon Brown (i)	Brandonbilt Motorsports	Chevrolet	Coastal Carolina University
88	Matt Crafton	ThorSport Racing	Toyota	Menards, Fisher Nuts
92	Regan Smith	RBR Enterprises	Ford	BTS Tire & Wheel Distributors, Advance Auto Parts
98	Grant Enfinger (R)	ThorSport Racing	Toyota	Champion Power Equipment
99	Brandon Jones (i)	MDM Motorsports	Chevrolet	Roland
Official entry list

== Practice ==
=== First practice ===
The first practice session was held on Thursday, May 18, at 5:00 p.m. EST, and would last for 55 minutes. Christopher Bell of Kyle Busch Motorsports would set the fastest time in the session, with a lap of 29.664 and an average speed of 182.039 miles per hour (292.963 km/h).

Pos.	#	Driver	Team	Make	Time	Speed
1	4	Christopher Bell	Kyle Busch Motorsports	Toyota	29.664	182.039
2	29	Chase Briscoe (R)	Brad Keselowski Racing	Ford	29.684	181.916
3	27	Ben Rhodes	ThorSport Racing	Toyota	29.808	181.159
Full first practice results

=== Second and final practice ===
The second and final practice session, sometimes referred to as Happy Hour, was held on Thursday, May 18, at 7:00 p.m. EST, and would last for 55 minutes. Noah Gragson of Kyle Busch Motorsports would set the fastest time in the session, with a lap of 29.680 and an average speed of 181.941 miles per hour (292.806 km/h).

Pos.	#	Driver	Team	Make	Time	Speed
1	18	Noah Gragson (R)	Kyle Busch Motorsports	Toyota	29.680	181.941
2	19	Austin Cindric (R)	Brad Keselowski Racing	Ford	29.734	181.610
3	21	Johnny Sauter	GMS Racing	Chevrolet	29.881	180.717
Full Happy Hour practice results

== Qualifying ==
Qualifying was held on Friday, May 19, at 4:45 p.m. EST. Since Charlotte Motor Speedway is at least a 1.5 miles (2.4 km) racetrack, the qualifying system was a single car, single lap, two round system where in the first round, everyone would set a time to determine positions 13–32. Then, the fastest 12 qualifiers would move on to the second round to determine positions 1–12.

Christopher Bell of Kyle Busch Motorsports would win the pole, setting a lap of 29.852 and an average speed of 180.892 miles per hour (291.117 km/h) in the second round.

Two drivers would fail to qualify: Brandon Brown and Cody Ware.

=== Full qualifying results ===
Pos.	#	Driver	Team	Make	Time (R1)	Speed (R1)	Time (R2)	Speed (R2)
1	4	Christopher Bell	Kyle Busch Motorsports	Toyota	30.072	179.569	29.852	180.892
2	29	Chase Briscoe (R)	Brad Keselowski Racing	Ford	29.927	180.439	29.881	180.717
3	21	Johnny Sauter	GMS Racing	Chevrolet	30.125	179.253	29.929	180.427
4	51	Kyle Busch (i)	Kyle Busch Motorsports	Toyota	30.294	178.253	30.053	179.683
5	27	Ben Rhodes	ThorSport Racing	Toyota	30.145	179.134	30.126	179.247
6	88	Matt Crafton	ThorSport Racing	Toyota	30.421	177.509	30.149	179.110
7	7	Brett Moffitt	Red Horse Racing	Toyota	30.272	178.383	30.202	178.796
8	19	Austin Cindric (R)	Brad Keselowski Racing	Ford	30.203	178.790	30.206	178.772
9	75	Parker Kligerman	Henderson Motorsports	Toyota	30.345	177.954	30.241	178.566
10	17	Timothy Peters	Red Horse Racing	Toyota	30.423	177.497	30.253	178.495
11	16	Ryan Truex	Hattori Racing Enterprises	Toyota	30.377	177.766	30.261	178.448
12	33	Kaz Grala (R)	GMS Racing	Chevrolet	30.460	177.282	30.329	178.047
Eliminated in Round 1
13	8	John Hunter Nemechek	NEMCO Motorsports	Chevrolet	30.514	176.968	—	—
14	02	Austin Hill	Young's Motorsports	Ford	30.533	176.858	—	—
15	18	Noah Gragson (R)	Kyle Busch Motorsports	Toyota	30.541	176.811	—	—
16	98	Grant Enfinger (R)	ThorSport Racing	Toyota	30.708	175.850	—	—
17	13	Cody Coughlin (R)	ThorSport Racing	Toyota	30.719	175.787	—	—
18	66	Ross Chastain (i)	Bolen Motorsports	Chevrolet	30.757	175.570	—	—
19	22	Austin Wayne Self	AM Racing	Toyota	30.764	175.530	—	—
20	92	Regan Smith	RBR Enterprises	Ford	30.801	175.319	—	—
21	99	Brandon Jones (i)	MDM Motorsports	Chevrolet	31.111	173.572	—	—
22	83	J. J. Yeley (i)	Copp Motorsports	Chevrolet	31.208	173.033	—	—
23	24	Justin Haley (R)	GMS Racing	Chevrolet	31.247	172.817	—	—
24	44	Matt Mills (i)	Faith Motorsports	Chevrolet	31.556	171.124	—	—
25	1	Jordan Anderson	TJL Motorsports	Chevrolet	31.770	169.972	—	—
26	45	T. J. Bell	Niece Motorsports	Chevrolet	31.812	169.747	—	—
27	50	Spencer Boyd	Beaver Motorsports	Chevrolet	31.931	169.115	—	—
28	52	Stewart Friesen (R)	Halmar Friesen Racing	Chevrolet	32.543	165.934	—	—
29	49	Wendell Chavous (R)	Premium Motorsports	Chevrolet	33.074	163.270	—	—
30	6	Norm Benning	Norm Benning Racing	Chevrolet	33.701	160.233	—	—
31	10	Jennifer Jo Cobb	Jennifer Jo Cobb Racing	Chevrolet	34.131	158.214	—	—
32	63	Todd Peck	MB Motorsports	Chevrolet	35.351	152.754	—	—
Failed to qualify
33	86	Brandon Brown (i)	Brandonbilt Motorsports	Chevrolet	32.127	168.083	—	—
34	12	Cody Ware (i)	Rick Ware Racing	Chevrolet	32.432	166.502	—	—
Official qualifying results
Official starting lineup

== Race results ==
Stage 1 Laps: 40

Pos.	#	Driver	Team	Make	Pts
1	51	Kyle Busch (i)	Kyle Busch Motorsports	Toyota	0
2	21	Johnny Sauter	GMS Racing	Chevrolet	9
3	8	John Hunter Nemechek	NEMCO Motorsports	Chevrolet	8
4	88	Matt Crafton	ThorSport Racing	Toyota	7
5	29	Chase Briscoe (R)	Brad Keselowski Racing	Ford	6
6	27	Ben Rhodes	ThorSport Racing	Toyota	5
7	66	Ross Chastain (i)	Bolen Motorsports	Chevrolet	0
8	16	Ryan Truex	Hattori Racing Enterprises	Toyota	3
9	18	Noah Gragson (R)	Kyle Busch Motorsports	Toyota	2
10	17	Timothy Peters	Red Horse Racing	Toyota	1

Stage 2 Laps: 40

Pos.	#	Driver	Team	Make	Pts
1	51	Kyle Busch (i)	Kyle Busch Motorsports	Toyota	0
2	21	Johnny Sauter	GMS Racing	Chevrolet	9
3	88	Matt Crafton	ThorSport Racing	Toyota	8
4	27	Ben Rhodes	ThorSport Racing	Toyota	7
5	4	Christopher Bell	Kyle Busch Motorsports	Toyota	6
6	16	Ryan Truex	Hattori Racing Enterprises	Toyota	5
7	29	Chase Briscoe (R)	Brad Keselowski Racing	Ford	4
8	17	Timothy Peters	Red Horse Racing	Toyota	3
9	18	Noah Gragson (R)	Kyle Busch Motorsports	Toyota	2
10	02	Austin Hill	Young's Motorsports	Ford	1

Stage 3 Laps: 54

Fin	St	#	Driver	Team	Make	Laps	Led	Status	Pts
1	4	51	Kyle Busch (i)	Kyle Busch Motorsports	Toyota	134	90	running	0
2	3	21	Johnny Sauter	GMS Racing	Chevrolet	134	22	running	53
3	1	4	Christopher Bell	Kyle Busch Motorsports	Toyota	134	2	running	40
4	11	16	Ryan Truex	Hattori Racing Enterprises	Toyota	134	0	running	41
5	10	17	Timothy Peters	Red Horse Racing	Toyota	134	0	running	36
6	6	88	Matt Crafton	ThorSport Racing	Toyota	134	1	running	46
7	16	98	Grant Enfinger (R)	ThorSport Racing	Toyota	134	0	running	30
8	5	27	Ben Rhodes	ThorSport Racing	Toyota	134	0	running	41
9	15	18	Noah Gragson (R)	Kyle Busch Motorsports	Toyota	134	0	running	32
10	9	75	Parker Kligerman	Henderson Motorsports	Toyota	134	6	running	27
11	2	29	Chase Briscoe (R)	Brad Keselowski Racing	Ford	134	0	running	36
12	19	22	Austin Wayne Self	AM Racing	Toyota	134	0	running	25
13	8	19	Austin Cindric (R)	Brad Keselowski Racing	Ford	134	7	running	24
14	26	45	T. J. Bell	Niece Motorsports	Chevrolet	134	0	running	23
15	22	83	J. J. Yeley (i)	Copp Motorsports	Chevrolet	134	0	running	0
16	17	13	Cody Coughlin (R)	ThorSport Racing	Toyota	134	0	running	21
17	23	24	Justin Haley (R)	GMS Racing	Chevrolet	134	0	running	20
18	7	7	Brett Moffitt	Red Horse Racing	Toyota	134	0	running	19
19	18	66	Ross Chastain (i)	Bolen Motorsports	Chevrolet	133	3	running	0
20	27	50	Spencer Boyd	Beaver Motorsports	Chevrolet	133	0	running	17
21	25	1	Jordan Anderson	TJL Motorsports	Chevrolet	133	0	running	16
22	13	8	John Hunter Nemechek	NEMCO Motorsports	Chevrolet	132	0	running	23
23	28	52	Stewart Friesen (R)	Halmar Friesen Racing	Chevrolet	132	0	running	14
24	24	44	Matt Mills (i)	Faith Motorsports	Chevrolet	132	0	running	0
25	14	02	Austin Hill	Young's Motorsports	Ford	130	0	running	13
26	30	6	Norm Benning	Norm Benning Racing	Chevrolet	130	0	running	11
27	31	10	Jennifer Jo Cobb	Jennifer Jo Cobb Racing	Chevrolet	130	0	running	10
28	29	49	Wendell Chavous (R)	Premium Motorsports	Chevrolet	106	0	oil pump	9
29	20	92	Regan Smith	RBR Enterprises	Ford	101	0	crash	8
30	12	33	Kaz Grala (R)	GMS Racing	Chevrolet	70	0	crash	7
31	21	99	Brandon Jones (i)	MDM Motorsports	Chevrolet	62	3	crash	0
32	32	63	Todd Peck	MB Motorsports	Chevrolet	4	0	electrical	5
Failed to qualify
33		86	Brandon Brown (i)	Brandonbilt Motorsports	Chevrolet				
34		12	Cody Ware (i)	Rick Ware Racing	Chevrolet				
Official race results

== Standings after the race ==
Drivers' Championship standings

Pos	Driver	Points
1	Johnny Sauter	242
2	Christopher Bell	227 (-15)
3	Matt Crafton	191 (–51)
4	Chase Briscoe	171 (–71)
5	Ben Rhodes	170 (–72)
6	Timothy Peters	170 (–72)
7	Grant Enfinger	147 (–95)
8	Kaz Grala	139 (–103)
Official driver's standings

- Note: Only the first 8 positions are included for the driver standings.

Previous race: 2017 Toyota Tundra 250	NASCAR Camping World Truck Series; 2017 season	Next race: 2017 Bar Harbor 200
