= 2017 Bar Harbor 200 =

Sixth race of the 2017 NASCAR Camping World Truck Series

2017 Bar Harbor 200 Presented by Sea Watch International
Race details
- Race 6 of 23 of the 2017 NASCAR Camping World Truck Series
- Date: June 2, 2017
- Official name: 17th Annual Bar Harbor 200 Presented by Sea Watch International
- Location: Dover, Delaware, Dover International Speedway
- Course: Permanent racing facility
- Course length: 1 miles (1.6 km)
- Distance: 200 laps, 200 mi (321.868 km)
- Scheduled distance: 200 laps, 200 mi (321.868 km)
- Average speed: 99.133 miles per hour (159.539 km/h)

Pole position
Driver	Chase Briscoe	Brad Keselowski Racing
- Time: 23.007

Most laps led
Driver	Ben Rhodes	ThorSport Racing
- Laps: 71

Winner
No. 21	Johnny Sauter	GMS Racing

Television in the United States
- Network: Fox Sports 1
- Announcers: Vince Welch, Phil Parsons, Michael Waltrip

Radio in the United States
- Radio: Motor Racing Network

The 2017 Bar Harbor 200 presented by Sea Watch International was the sixth stock car race of the 2017 NASCAR Camping World Truck Series and the 17th iteration of the event. The race was held on Friday, June 2, 2017, in Dover, Delaware at Dover International Speedway, a 1 mile (1.6 km) permanent oval-shaped racetrack. The race took the scheduled 200 laps to complete. At race's end, Johnny Sauter, driving for GMS Racing, would take control of the late stages of the race with 33 to go to win his 14th career NASCAR Camping World Truck Series career and his first win of the season. To fill out the podium, Kaz Grala of GMS Racing and Grant Enfinger of ThorSport Racing would finish second and third, respectively.

== Background ==
The layout of Dover International Speedway, the venue where the race was held.

Dover International Speedway is an oval race track in Dover, Delaware, United States that has held at least two NASCAR races since it opened in 1969. In addition to NASCAR, the track also hosted USAC and the NTT IndyCar Series. The track features one layout, a 1-mile (1.6 km) concrete oval, with 24° banking in the turns and 9° banking on the straights. The speedway is owned and operated by Dover Motorsports.

The track, nicknamed "The Monster Mile", was built in 1969 by Melvin Joseph of Melvin L. Joseph Construction Company, Inc., with an asphalt surface, but was replaced with concrete in 1995. Six years later in 2001, the track's capacity moved to 135,000 seats, making the track have the largest capacity of sports venue in the mid-Atlantic. In 2002, the name changed to Dover International Speedway from Dover Downs International Speedway after Dover Downs Gaming and Entertainment split, making Dover Motorsports. From 2007 to 2009, the speedway worked on an improvement project called "The Monster Makeover", which expanded facilities at the track and beautified the track. After the 2014 season, the track's capacity was reduced to 95,500 seats.

=== Entry list ===
- (R) denotes rookie driver.
- (i) denotes driver who is ineligible for series driver points.

#	Driver	Team	Make	Sponsor
1	Jordan Anderson	TJL Motorsports	Chevrolet	TJL Motorsports "Fueled By Fans"
02	Austin Hill	Young's Motorsports	Ford	JRS Competitive Finishes
4	Christopher Bell	Kyle Busch Motorsports	Toyota	JBL
6	Norm Benning	Norm Benning Racing	Chevrolet	Norm Benning Racing
8	John Hunter Nemechek	NEMCO Motorsports	Chevrolet	Fire Alarm Services, Acme
10	Jennifer Jo Cobb	Jennifer Jo Cobb Racing	Chevrolet	Driven 2 Honor
13	Cody Coughlin (R)	ThorSport Racing	Toyota	JEGS
16	Ryan Truex	Hattori Racing Enterprises	Toyota	SeaWatch International, Bar Harbor
18	Noah Gragson (R)	Kyle Busch Motorsports	Toyota	Switch
19	Austin Cindric (R)	Brad Keselowski Racing	Ford	LTi Printing
21	Johnny Sauter	GMS Racing	Chevrolet	Allegiant Air
24	Justin Haley (R)	GMS Racing	Chevrolet	Fraternal Order of Eagles
27	Ben Rhodes	ThorSport Racing	Toyota	Safelite Auto Glass
29	Chase Briscoe (R)	Brad Keselowski Racing	Ford	Cooper-Standard
33	Kaz Grala (R)	GMS Racing	Chevrolet	Outlaw Fasteners
36	J. J. Yeley (i)	Copp Motorsports	Chevrolet	Nano Pro MT, UNOH
44	Matt Mills (i)	Faith Motorsports	Chevrolet	Sparrow Ranch On The Island
45	T. J. Bell	Niece Motorsports	Chevrolet	Niece Motorsports
46	Todd Gilliland	Kyle Busch Motorsports	Toyota	Pedigree
49	Wendell Chavous (R)	Premium Motorsports	Chevrolet	Premium Motorsports
50	Cody Ware (i)	Beaver Motorsports	Chevrolet	Motorsports Safety Group
51	Harrison Burton	Kyle Busch Motorsports	Toyota	DEX Imaging
52	Stewart Friesen (R)	Halmar Friesen Racing	Chevrolet	Halmar
63	Camden Murphy	MB Motorsports	Chevrolet	MB Motorsports
66	Ross Chastain (i)	Bolen Motorsports	Chevrolet	Protect Your Melon
75	Parker Kligerman	Henderson Motorsports	Toyota	Food Country USA
83	Todd Peck	Copp Motorsports	Chevrolet	Copp Motorsports
88	Matt Crafton	ThorSport Racing	Toyota	Menards, Ideal Door
92	Regan Smith	RBR Enterprises	Ford	BTS Tire & Wheel Distributors, Advance Auto Parts
97	Jesse Little	JJL Motorsports	Toyota	JJL Motorsports
98	Grant Enfinger (R)	ThorSport Racing	Toyota	RIDE TV
99	Brandon Jones (i)	MDM Motorsports	Chevrolet	Roland
Official entry list

== Practice ==
=== First practice ===
The first practice session was held on Thursday, June 1, at 2:00 PM EST, and would last for 55 minutes. Noah Gragson of Kyle Busch Motorsports would set the fastest time in the session, with a lap of 23.046 and an average speed of 156.209 miles per hour (251.394 km/h).

Pos.	#	Driver	Team	Make	Time	Speed
1	18	Noah Gragson (R)	Kyle Busch Motorsports	Toyota	23.046	156.209
2	27	Ben Rhodes	ThorSport Racing	Toyota	23.093	155.891
3	19	Austin Cindric (R)	Brad Keselowski Racing	Ford	23.358	154.123
Full first practice results

=== Second and final practice ===
The second and final practice session, sometimes referred to as Happy Hour, was held on Thursday, June 1, at 4:00 PM EST, and would last for 55 minutes. Noah Gragson of Kyle Busch Motorsports would set the fastest time in the session, with a lap of 22.933 and an average speed of 156.979 miles per hour (252.633 km/h), completing a sweep of both practice sessions.

Pos.	#	Driver	Team	Make	Time	Speed
1	18	Noah Gragson (R)	Kyle Busch Motorsports	Toyota	22.933	156.979
2	4	Christopher Bell	Kyle Busch Motorsports	Toyota	23.074	156.020
3	21	Johnny Sauter	GMS Racing	Chevrolet	23.124	155.682
Full Happy Hour practice results

== Qualifying ==
Qualifying was held on Friday, June 2, at 2:35 PM EST. Since Dover International Speedway is under 1.5 miles (2.4 km), the qualifying system was a multi-car system that included three rounds. The first round was 15 minutes, where every driver would be able to set a lap within the 15 minutes. Then, the second round would consist of the fastest 24 cars in Round 1, and drivers would have 10 minutes to set a lap. Round 3 consisted of the fastest 12 drivers from Round 2, and the drivers would have 5 minutes to set a time. Whoever was fastest in Round 3 would win the pole.

Chase Briscoe of Brad Keselowski Racing would win the pole after advancing from both preliminary rounds and setting the fastest lap in Round 3, with a time of 23.007 and an average speed of 156.474 miles per hour (251.820 km/h).

No drivers would fail to qualify.

=== Full qualifying results ===
Pos.	#	Driver	Team	Make	Time (R1)	Speed (R1)	Time (R2)	Speed (R2)	Time (R3)	Speed (R3)
1	29	Chase Briscoe (R)	Brad Keselowski Racing	Ford	22.886	157.301	23.128	155.655	23.007	156.474
2	16	Ryan Truex	Hattori Racing Enterprises	Toyota	23.346	154.202	23.181	155.300	23.015	156.420
3	4	Christopher Bell	Kyle Busch Motorsports	Toyota	23.089	155.918	23.067	156.067	23.025	156.352
4	19	Austin Cindric (R)	Brad Keselowski Racing	Ford	23.089	155.918	23.004	156.495	23.063	156.094
5	97	Jesse Little	JJL Motorsports	Toyota	23.582	152.659	23.124	155.682	23.089	155.918
6	27	Ben Rhodes	ThorSport Racing	Toyota	23.322	154.361	23.152	155.494	23.130	155.642
7	75	Parker Kligerman	Henderson Motorsports	Toyota	22.926	157.027	23.046	156.209	23.148	155.521
8	18	Noah Gragson (R)	Kyle Busch Motorsports	Toyota	23.379	153.984	23.170	155.373	23.156	155.467
9	66	Ross Chastain (i)	Bolen Motorsports	Chevrolet	23.477	153.342	23.111	155.770	23.177	155.326
10	51	Harrison Burton	Kyle Busch Motorsports	Toyota	23.349	154.182	23.213	155.086	23.223	155.019
11	21	Johnny Sauter	GMS Racing	Chevrolet	23.147	155.528	23.143	155.555	23.225	155.005
12	98	Grant Enfinger (R)	ThorSport Racing	Toyota	23.561	152.795	23.220	155.039	23.241	154.899
Eliminated in Round 2
13	88	Matt Crafton	ThorSport Racing	Toyota	23.397	153.866	23.232	154.959	-	-
14	99	Brandon Jones (i)	MDM Motorsports	Chevrolet	23.971	150.181	23.300	154.506	-	-
15	46	Todd Gilliland	Kyle Busch Motorsports	Toyota	23.430	153.649	23.307	154.460	-	-
16	33	Kaz Grala (R)	GMS Racing	Chevrolet	23.537	152.951	23.346	154.202	-	-
17	13	Cody Coughlin (R)	ThorSport Racing	Toyota	23.491	153.250	23.413	153.761	-	-
18	92	Regan Smith	RBR Enterprises	Ford	23.820	151.134	23.472	153.374	-	-
19	02	Austin Hill	Young's Motorsports	Ford	23.478	153.335	23.479	153.329	-	-
20	8	John Hunter Nemechek	NEMCO Motorsports	Chevrolet	23.942	150.363	23.547	152.886	-	-
21	24	Justin Haley (R)	GMS Racing	Chevrolet	23.639	152.291	23.639	152.291	-	-
22	52	Stewart Friesen (R)	Halmar Friesen Racing	Chevrolet	24.084	149.477	23.702	151.886	-	-
23	45	T. J. Bell	Niece Motorsports	Chevrolet	23.856	150.905	23.802	151.248	-	-
24	50	Cody Ware (i)	Beaver Motorsports	Chevrolet	24.845	144.898	-	-	-	-
Eliminated in Round 1
25	44	Matt Mills (i)	Faith Motorsports	Chevrolet	24.853	144.852	-	-	-	-
26	1	Jordan Anderson	TJL Motorsports	Chevrolet	25.151	143.135	-	-	-	-
27	36	J. J. Yeley (i)	Copp Motorsports	Chevrolet	25.263	142.501	-	-	-	-
28	49	Wendell Chavous (R)	Premium Motorsports	Chevrolet	25.487	141.248	-	-	-	-
29	63	Camden Murphy	MB Motorsports	Chevrolet	26.338	136.685	-	-	-	-
30	6	Norm Benning	Norm Benning Racing	Chevrolet	27.042	133.126	-	-	-	-
31	10	Jennifer Jo Cobb	Jennifer Jo Cobb Racing	Chevrolet	27.491	130.952	-	-	-	-
32	83	Todd Peck	Copp Motorsports	Chevrolet	28.118	128.032	-	-	-	-
Official qualifying results
Official starting lineup

== Race results ==
Stage 1 Laps: 45

Pos.	#	Driver	Team	Make	Pts
1	16	Ryan Truex	Hattori Racing Enterprises	Toyota	10
2	29	Chase Briscoe (R)	Brad Keselowski Racing	Ford	9
3	66	Ross Chastain (i)	Bolen Motorsports	Chevrolet	0
4	21	Johnny Sauter	GMS Racing	Chevrolet	7
5	18	Noah Gragson (R)	Kyle Busch Motorsports	Toyota	6
6	88	Matt Crafton	ThorSport Racing	Toyota	5
7	27	Ben Rhodes	ThorSport Racing	Toyota	4
8	24	Justin Haley (R)	GMS Racing	Chevrolet	3
9	8	John Hunter Nemechek	NEMCO Motorsports	Chevrolet	2
10	46	Todd Gilliland	Kyle Busch Motorsports	Toyota	1

Stage 2 Laps: 45

Pos.	#	Driver	Team	Make	Pts
1	88	Matt Crafton	ThorSport Racing	Toyota	10
2	16	Ryan Truex	Hattori Racing Enterprises	Toyota	9
3	27	Ben Rhodes	ThorSport Racing	Toyota	8
4	46	Todd Gilliland	Kyle Busch Motorsports	Toyota	7
5	19	Austin Cindric (R)	Brad Keselowski Racing	Ford	6
6	66	Ross Chastain (i)	Bolen Motorsports	Chevrolet	0
7	51	Harrison Burton	Kyle Busch Motorsports	Toyota	4
8	29	Chase Briscoe (R)	Brad Keselowski Racing	Ford	3
9	21	Johnny Sauter	GMS Racing	Chevrolet	2
10	33	Kaz Grala (R)	GMS Racing	Chevrolet	1

Stage 3 Laps: 110

Fin	St	#	Driver	Team	Make	Laps	Led	Status	Pts
1	11	21	Johnny Sauter	GMS Racing	Chevrolet	200	33	running	49
2	16	33	Kaz Grala (R)	GMS Racing	Chevrolet	200	0	running	36
3	12	98	Grant Enfinger (R)	ThorSport Racing	Toyota	200	0	running	34
4	6	27	Ben Rhodes	ThorSport Racing	Toyota	200	71	running	45
5	4	19	Austin Cindric (R)	Brad Keselowski Racing	Ford	200	0	running	38
6	14	99	Brandon Jones (i)	MDM Motorsports	Chevrolet	200	0	running	0
7	18	92	Regan Smith	RBR Enterprises	Ford	200	0	running	30
8	21	24	Justin Haley (R)	GMS Racing	Chevrolet	200	0	running	32
9	8	18	Noah Gragson (R)	Kyle Busch Motorsports	Toyota	199	0	running	34
10	2	16	Ryan Truex	Hattori Racing Enterprises	Toyota	199	47	running	46
11	13	88	Matt Crafton	ThorSport Racing	Toyota	199	46	running	41
12	1	29	Chase Briscoe (R)	Brad Keselowski Racing	Ford	199	3	running	37
13	10	51	Harrison Burton	Kyle Busch Motorsports	Toyota	198	0	running	28
14	5	97	Jesse Little	JJL Motorsports	Toyota	198	0	running	36
15	9	66	Ross Chastain (i)	Bolen Motorsports	Chevrolet	197	0	running	0
16	17	13	Cody Coughlin (R)	ThorSport Racing	Toyota	197	0	running	21
17	25	44	Matt Mills (i)	Faith Motorsports	Chevrolet	196	0	running	0
18	24	50	Cody Ware (i)	Beaver Motorsports	Chevrolet	190	0	running	0
19	28	49	Wendell Chavous (R)	Premium Motorsports	Chevrolet	118	0	crash	18
20	15	46	Todd Gilliland	Kyle Busch Motorsports	Toyota	115	0	suspension	25
21	7	75	Parker Kligerman	Henderson Motorsports	Toyota	96	0	crash	16
22	20	8	John Hunter Nemechek	NEMCO Motorsports	Chevrolet	91	0	crash	17
23	23	45	T. J. Bell	Niece Motorsports	Chevrolet	89	0	crash	14
24	26	1	Jordan Anderson	TJL Motorsports	Chevrolet	82	0	engine	13
25	3	4	Christopher Bell	Kyle Busch Motorsports	Toyota	35	0	crash	12
26	30	6	Norm Benning	Norm Benning Racing	Chevrolet	27	0	brakes	11
27	19	02	Austin Hill	Young's Motorsports	Ford	22	0	crash	10
28	22	52	Stewart Friesen (R)	Halmar Friesen Racing	Chevrolet	20	0	crash	9
29	27	36	J. J. Yeley (i)	Copp Motorsports	Chevrolet	16	0	vibration	0
30	31	10	Jennifer Jo Cobb	Jennifer Jo Cobb Racing	Chevrolet	12	0	vibration	7
31	32	83	Todd Peck	Copp Motorsports	Chevrolet	4	0	electrical	6
32	29	63	Camden Murphy	MB Motorsports	Chevrolet	4	0	brakes	5
Official race results

== Standings after the race ==
Drivers' Championship standings

Pos	Driver	Points
1	Johnny Sauter	291
2	Christopher Bell	239 (-52)
3	Matt Crafton	232 (–59)
4	Ben Rhodes	215 (–76)
5	Chase Briscoe	208 (–83)
6	Ryan Truex	185 (–106)
7	Grant Enfinger	181 (–110)
8	Kaz Grala	175 (–116)
Official driver's standings

- Note: Only the first 8 positions are included for the driver standings.

Previous race: 2017 North Carolina Education Lottery 200	NASCAR Camping World Truck Series; 2017 season	Next race: 2017 WinstarOnlineGaming.com 400
