= 2017 Ford EcoBoost 200 =

23rd race of the 2017 NASCAR Camping World Truck Series

Race details
- Race 23 of 23 of the 2017 NASCAR Camping World Truck Series
- Date: November 17, 2017
- Official name: 22nd Annual Ford EcoBoost 200
- Location: Homestead, Florida, Homestead-Miami Speedway
- Course: Permanent racing facility
- Course length: 1.5 miles (2.41 km)
- Distance: 134 laps, 201 mi (323.478 km)
- Scheduled distance: 134 laps, 201 mi (323.478 km)
- Average speed: 135.556 miles per hour (218.156 km/h)

Pole position
Driver	Chase Briscoe	Brad Keselowski Racing
- Time: 32.239

Most laps led
Driver	Chase Briscoe	Brad Keselowski Racing
- Laps: 81

Winner
No. 29	Chase Briscoe	Brad Keselowski Racing

Television in the United States
- Network: Fox Sports 1
- Announcers: Vince Welch, Phil Parsons, Michael Waltrip

Radio in the United States
- Radio: Motor Racing Network

The 2017 Ford EcoBoost 200 was the 23rd and final stock car race of the 2017 NASCAR Camping World Truck Series, the sixth race of the 2017 NASCAR Camping World Truck Series playoffs, the championship 4 race, and the 22nd iteration of the event. The race was held on Friday, November 17, 2017, in Homestead, Florida at Homestead–Miami Speedway, a 1.5 miles (2.4 km) permanent oval-shaped racetrack. The race took the scheduled 134 laps to complete. At race's end, Chase Briscoe, driving for Brad Keselowski Racing, would dominate the race to win his first career NASCAR Camping World Truck Series win and his only win of the season.

Meanwhile, second-place finisher, Kyle Busch Motorsports driver Christopher Bell, would clinch his first NASCAR Camping World Truck Series championship by finishing second, behind Briscoe.

== Background ==
The layout of Homestead–Miami Speedway, the venue where the race was held.

Homestead-Miami Speedway is a motor racing track located in Homestead, Florida. The track, which has several configurations, has promoted several series of racing, including NASCAR, the Verizon IndyCar Series, the Grand-Am Rolex Sports Car Series and the Championship Cup Series.

From 2002 to 2019, Homestead–Miami Speedway hosted the final race of the season in all three of NASCAR's series: the Cup Series, Xfinity Series, and the Camping World Truck Series. Ford Motor Company sponsored all three of the season-ending races, under the names Ford EcoBoost 400, Ford EcoBoost 300, and Ford EcoBoost 200, respectively. The weekend itself was marketed as Ford Championship Weekend. The Xfinity Series held its season-ending races at Homestead from 1995 until 2020, when it was moved to Phoenix Raceway, along with NASCAR's other two series.

=== Entry list ===
- (R) denotes rookie driver.
- (i) denotes driver who are ineligible for series driver points.
- (CC) denotes championship contender.

#	Driver	Team	Make	Sponsor
0	Jennifer Jo Cobb	Jennifer Jo Cobb Racing	Chevrolet	Driven 2 Honor
1	Jordan Anderson	TJL Motorsports	Chevrolet	Lucas Oil, Jacob Companies
02	Timothy Peters	Young's Motorsports	Chevrolet	Autos By Nelson, Brandt Professional Agriculture
4	Christopher Bell (CC)	Kyle Busch Motorsports	Toyota	JBL
6	Norm Benning	Norm Benning Racing	Chevrolet	Zomongo
8	John Hunter Nemechek	NEMCO Motorsports	Chevrolet	Fire Alarm Services
10	Ray Ciccarelli	Jennifer Jo Cobb Racing	Chevrolet	Driven 2 Honor
13	Cody Coughlin (R)	ThorSport Racing	Toyota	RIDE TV
15	Wendell Chavous (R)	Premium Motorsports	Chevrolet	Low T Center
16	Ryan Truex	Hattori Racing Enterprises	Toyota	Chiba Toyopet
18	Noah Gragson (R)	Kyle Busch Motorsports	Toyota	Switch
19	Austin Cindric (R) (CC)	Brad Keselowski Racing	Ford	Reese Brands, Draw-Tite
21	Johnny Sauter (CC)	GMS Racing	Chevrolet	ISM Connect
24	Justin Haley (R)	GMS Racing	Chevrolet	MyWhy
27	Ben Rhodes	ThorSport Racing	Toyota	Safelite AutoGlass
29	Chase Briscoe (R)	Brad Keselowski Racing	Ford	Cooper-Standard
33	Kaz Grala (R)	GMS Racing	Chevrolet	Stealth
36	Camden Murphy	MB Motorsports	Chevrolet	MB Motorsports
44	Austin Wayne Self	Martins Motorsports	Chevrolet	AM Technical Solutions, Don't Mess with Texas
45	T. J. Bell	Niece Motorsports	Chevrolet	MG Machinery
49	Robby Lyons (i)	Premium Motorsports	Chevrolet	Sunwest Construction
50	Josh Reaume	Beaver Motorsports	Chevrolet	Beaver Motorsports
51	Myatt Snider	Kyle Busch Motorsports	Toyota	Liberty Tax Service
52	Stewart Friesen (R)	Halmar Friesen Racing	Chevrolet	Halmar "We Build America"
57	Mike Senica	Norm Benning Racing	Chevrolet	Norm Benning Racing
63	Chris Windom	MB Motorsports	Chevrolet	Baldwin Brothers Racing
83	Bayley Currey	Copp Motorsports	Chevrolet	Baja, Preferred Industrial Contractors, Inc.
87	Joe Nemechek	NEMCO Motorsports	Chevrolet	Fire Alarm Services
88	Matt Crafton (CC)	ThorSport Racing	Toyota	Menards, Hormel Black Label Bacon
92	Regan Smith	RBR Enterprises	Ford	BTS Tire & Wheel Distributors, Advance Auto Parts
98	Grant Enfinger (R)	ThorSport Racing	Toyota	Champion Power Equipment
99	Dalton Sargeant	MDM Motorsports	Chevrolet	Performance Plus Motor Oil
Official entry list

== Practice ==
=== First practice ===
The first practice session was held on Friday, November 17, at 8:30 AM EST. The session would last for 55 minutes. Johnny Sauter of GMS Racing would set the fastest time in the session, with a lap of 32.023 and an average speed of 168.629 mph (271.382 km/h).

Pos.	#	Driver	Team	Make	Time	Speed
1	21	Johnny Sauter (CC)	GMS Racing	Chevrolet	32.023	168.629
2	33	Kaz Grala (R)	GMS Racing	Chevrolet	32.025	168.618
3	4	Christopher Bell (CC)	Kyle Busch Motorsports	Toyota	32.116	168.140
Full first practice results

=== Second and final practice ===
The final practice session, sometimes known as Happy Hour, was held on Friday, November 17, at 10:00 AM EST. The session would last for 55 minutes. John Hunter Nemechek of NEMCO Motorsports would set the fastest time in the session, with a lap of 32.680 and an average speed of 165.239 mph (265.926 km/h).

Pos.	#	Driver	Team	Make	Time	Speed
1	8	John Hunter Nemechek	NEMCO Motorsports	Chevrolet	32.680	165.239
2	98	Grant Enfinger (R)	ThorSport Racing	Toyota	32.733	164.971
3	33	Kaz Grala (R)	GMS Racing	Chevrolet	32.758	164.845
Full Happy Hour practice results

== Qualifying ==
Qualifying was held on Friday, November 17, at 3:30 PM EST. Since Homestead–Miami Speedway is at least 1.5 miles (2.4 km) in length, the qualifying system was a single car, single lap, two round system where in the first round, everyone would set a time to determine positions 13–32. Then, the fastest 12 qualifiers would move on to the second round to determine positions 1–12.

Chase Briscoe of Brad Keselowski Racing would win the pole, setting a lap of 32.239 and an average speed of 167.499 miles per hour (269.564 km/h) in the second round.

No drivers would fail to qualify.

=== Full qualifying results ===
Pos.	#	Driver	Team	Make	Time (R1)	Speed (R1)	Time (R2)	Speed (R2)
1	29	Chase Briscoe (R)	Brad Keselowski Racing	Ford	32.308	167.141	32.239	167.499
2	27	Ben Rhodes	ThorSport Racing	Toyota	32.356	166.893	32.268	167.348
3	19	Austin Cindric (R) (CC)	Brad Keselowski Racing	Ford	32.298	167.193	32.368	166.831
4	98	Grant Enfinger (R)	ThorSport Racing	Toyota	32.528	166.011	32.415	166.590
5	18	Noah Gragson (R)	Kyle Busch Motorsports	Toyota	32.463	166.343	32.548	165.909
6	16	Ryan Truex	Hattori Racing Enterprises	Toyota	32.554	165.878	32.560	165.848
7	24	Justin Haley (R)	GMS Racing	Chevrolet	32.525	166.026	32.588	165.705
8	88	Matt Crafton (CC)	ThorSport Racing	Toyota	32.627	165.507	32.606	165.614
9	52	Stewart Friesen (R)	Halmar Friesen Racing	Chevrolet	32.614	165.573	32.642	165.431
10	33	Kaz Grala (R)	GMS Racing	Chevrolet	32.388	166.728	32.687	165.203
11	21	Johnny Sauter (CC)	GMS Racing	Chevrolet	32.269	167.343	32.709	165.092
12	51	Myatt Snider	Kyle Busch Motorsports	Toyota	32.556	165.868	33.421	161.575
Eliminated in Round 1
13	4	Christopher Bell (CC)	Kyle Busch Motorsports	Toyota	32.666	165.309	-	-
14	8	John Hunter Nemechek	NEMCO Motorsports	Chevrolet	32.691	165.183	-	-
15	92	Regan Smith	RBR Enterprises	Ford	32.767	164.800	-	-
16	13	Cody Coughlin (R)	ThorSport Racing	Toyota	33.065	163.315	-	-
17	02	Timothy Peters	Young's Motorsports	Chevrolet	33.115	163.068	-	-
18	44	Austin Wayne Self	Martins Motorsports	Chevrolet	33.172	162.788	-	-
19	99	Dalton Sargeant	MDM Motorsports	Chevrolet	33.363	161.856	-	-
20	45	T. J. Bell	Niece Motorsports	Chevrolet	33.520	161.098	-	-
21	63	Chris Windom	MB Motorsports	Chevrolet	33.696	160.256	-	-
22	1	Jordan Anderson	TJL Motorsports	Chevrolet	34.266	157.591	-	-
23	49	Robby Lyons (i)	Premium Motorsports	Chevrolet	34.380	157.068	-	-
24	15	Wendell Chavous (R)	Premium Motorsports	Chevrolet	34.934	154.577	-	-
25	36	Camden Murphy	MB Motorsports	Chevrolet	35.036	154.127	-	-
26	50	Josh Reaume	Beaver Motorsports	Chevrolet	35.122	153.750	-	-
27	6	Norm Benning	Norm Benning Racing	Chevrolet	36.463	148.095	-	-
Qualified by owner's points
28	87	Joe Nemechek	NEMCO Motorsports	Chevrolet	37.683	143.301	-	-
29	57	Mike Senica	Norm Benning Racing	Chevrolet	40.636	132.887	-	-
30	83	Bayley Currey	Copp Motorsports	Chevrolet	-	-	-	-
31	10	Ray Ciccarelli	Jennifer Jo Cobb Racing	Chevrolet	-	-	-	-
32	0	Jennifer Jo Cobb	Jennifer Jo Cobb Racing	Chevrolet	-	-	-	-
Official qualifying results
Official starting lineup

== Race results ==
- Note: Christopher Bell, Austin Cindric, Matt Crafton, and Johnny Sauter are not eligible for stage points because of their participation in the Championship 4.

Stage 1 Laps: 40

Pos.	#	Driver	Team	Make	Pts
1	4	Christopher Bell (CC)	Kyle Busch Motorsports	Toyota	0
2	29	Chase Briscoe (R)	Brad Keselowski Racing	Ford	9
3	98	Grant Enfinger (R)	ThorSport Racing	Toyota	8
4	27	Ben Rhodes	ThorSport Racing	Toyota	7
5	16	Ryan Truex	Hattori Racing Enterprises	Toyota	6
6	19	Austin Cindric (R) (CC)	Brad Keselowski Racing	Ford	0
7	88	Matt Crafton (CC)	ThorSport Racing	Toyota	0
8	21	Johnny Sauter (CC)	GMS Racing	Chevrolet	0
9	24	Justin Haley (R)	GMS Racing	Chevrolet	2
10	02	Timothy Peters	Young's Motorsports	Chevrolet	1

Stage 2 Laps: 40

Pos.	#	Driver	Team	Make	Pts
1	27	Ben Rhodes	ThorSport Racing	Toyota	10
2	4	Christopher Bell (CC)	Kyle Busch Motorsports	Toyota	0
3	29	Chase Briscoe (R)	Brad Keselowski Racing	Ford	8
4	16	Ryan Truex	Hattori Racing Enterprises	Toyota	7
5	21	Johnny Sauter (CC)	GMS Racing	Chevrolet	0
6	19	Austin Cindric (R) (CC)	Brad Keselowski Racing	Ford	0
7	02	Timothy Peters	Young's Motorsports	Chevrolet	4
8	88	Matt Crafton (CC)	ThorSport Racing	Toyota	0
9	18	Noah Gragson (R)	Kyle Busch Motorsports	Toyota	2
10	24	Justin Haley (R)	GMS Racing	Chevrolet	1

Stage 3 Laps: 54

Fin	St	#	Driver	Team	Make	Laps	Led	Status	Pts
1	1	29	Chase Briscoe (R)	Brad Keselowski Racing	Ford	134	81	running	57
2	13	4	Christopher Bell (CC)	Kyle Busch Motorsports	Toyota	134	10	running	35
3	11	21	Johnny Sauter (CC)	GMS Racing	Chevrolet	134	0	running	34
4	6	16	Ryan Truex	Hattori Racing Enterprises	Toyota	134	0	running	46
5	3	19	Austin Cindric (R) (CC)	Brad Keselowski Racing	Ford	134	0	running	32
6	8	88	Matt Crafton (CC)	ThorSport Racing	Toyota	134	0	running	31
7	9	52	Stewart Friesen (R)	Halmar Friesen Racing	Chevrolet	134	0	running	30
8	4	98	Grant Enfinger (R)	ThorSport Racing	Toyota	134	0	running	37
9	7	24	Justin Haley (R)	GMS Racing	Chevrolet	134	0	running	31
10	17	02	Timothy Peters	Young's Motorsports	Chevrolet	134	0	running	32
11	15	92	Regan Smith	RBR Enterprises	Ford	134	0	running	26
12	12	51	Myatt Snider	Kyle Busch Motorsports	Toyota	134	0	running	25
13	10	33	Kaz Grala (R)	GMS Racing	Chevrolet	133	0	running	24
14	16	13	Cody Coughlin (R)	ThorSport Racing	Toyota	133	0	running	23
15	14	8	John Hunter Nemechek	NEMCO Motorsports	Chevrolet	133	0	running	22
16	20	45	T. J. Bell	Niece Motorsports	Chevrolet	132	0	running	21
17	18	44	Austin Wayne Self	Martins Motorsports	Chevrolet	131	0	running	20
18	5	18	Noah Gragson (R)	Kyle Busch Motorsports	Toyota	131	0	running	21
19	2	27	Ben Rhodes	ThorSport Racing	Toyota	130	43	running	35
20	19	99	Dalton Sargeant	MDM Motorsports	Chevrolet	129	0	running	17
21	22	1	Jordan Anderson	TJL Motorsports	Chevrolet	128	0	running	16
22	26	50	Josh Reaume	Beaver Motorsports	Chevrolet	126	0	running	15
23	24	15	Wendell Chavous (R)	Premium Motorsports	Chevrolet	125	0	running	14
24	23	49	Robby Lyons (i)	Premium Motorsports	Chevrolet	125	0	running	0
25	27	6	Norm Benning	Norm Benning Racing	Chevrolet	119	0	running	12
26	21	63	Chris Windom	MB Motorsports	Chevrolet	71	0	electrical	11
27	25	36	Camden Murphy	MB Motorsports	Chevrolet	9	0	suspension	10
28	30	83	Bayley Currey	Copp Motorsports	Chevrolet	8	0	engine	9
29	28	87	Joe Nemechek	NEMCO Motorsports	Chevrolet	7	0	electrical	8
30	29	57	Mike Senica	Norm Benning Racing	Chevrolet	4	0	parked	7
31	32	0	Jennifer Jo Cobb	Jennifer Jo Cobb Racing	Chevrolet	0	0	electrical	6
32	31	10	Ray Ciccarelli	Jennifer Jo Cobb Racing	Chevrolet	0	0	engine	5
Official race results

== Standings after the race ==
Drivers' Championship standings

Pos	Driver	Points
1	Christopher Bell	4,035
2	Johnny Sauter	4,034 (-1)
3	Austin Cindric	4,032 (–3)
4	Matt Crafton	4,031 (–4)
5	Ben Rhodes	2,263 (–1,772)
6	Chase Briscoe	2,248 (–1,787)
7	Kaz Grala	2,214 (–1,821)
8	John Hunter Nemechek	2,206 (–1,829)
Official driver's standings

- Note: Only the first 8 positions are included for the driver standings.

Previous race: 2017 Lucas Oil 150	NASCAR Camping World Truck Series; 2017 season	Next race: 2018 NextEra Energy Resources 250
