= 2017 Alpha Energy Solutions 250 =

Third race of the 2017 NASCAR Camping World Truck Series

Race details
- Race 3 of 23 of the 2017 NASCAR Camping World Truck Series
- Date: April 1, 2017
- Official name: 19th Annual Alpha Energy Solutions 250
- Location: Martinsville, Virginia, Martinsville Speedway
- Course: Permanent racing facility
- Course length: 0.526 miles (0.847 km)
- Distance: 250 laps, 131.5 mi (211.628 km)
- Scheduled distance: 250 laps, 131.5 mi (211.628 km)
- Average speed: 64.867 miles per hour (104.393 km/h)

Pole position
Driver	Chase Elliott	GMS Racing
- Time: 19.943

Most laps led
Driver	Christopher Bell	Kyle Busch Motorsports
- Laps: 96

Winner
No. 23	Chase Elliott	GMS Racing

Television in the United States
- Network: FOX
- Announcers: Vince Welch, Michael Waltrip, Kevin Harvick

Radio in the United States
- Radio: Motor Racing Network

The 2017 Alpha Energy Solutions 250 was the third stock car race of the 2017 NASCAR Camping World Truck Series and the 19th iteration of the event. The race was held on Saturday, April 1, 2017, in Martinsville, Virginia at Martinsville Speedway, a 0.526 miles (0.847 km) permanent oval-shaped short track. The race took the 250 laps to complete. At race's end, Chase Elliott, driving for GMS Racing, would defend the field on the final restart with 12 to go to win his second career NASCAR Camping World Truck Series win and his only win of the season. To fill out the podium, Johnny Sauter of GMS Racing and Christopher Bell of Kyle Busch Motorsports would finish second and third, respectively.

== Background ==
The layout of Martinsville Speedway, the venue where the race was held.

Martinsville Speedway is a NASCAR-owned stock car racing track located in Henry County, in Ridgeway, Virginia, just to the south of Martinsville. At 0.526 miles (0.847 km) in length, it is the shortest track in the NASCAR Cup Series. The track was also one of the first paved oval tracks in NASCAR, being built in 1947 by H. Clay Earles. It is also the only remaining race track that has been on the NASCAR circuit from its beginning in 1948.

=== Entry list ===
- (R) denotes rookie driver.
- (i) denotes driver who is ineligible for series driver points.

#	Driver	Team	Make	Sponsor
1	Bryce Napier	TJL Motorsports	Chevrolet	Veterans Motorsports, ASAP Appliance Service
02	Austin Hill	Young's Motorsports	Ford	Victory Wear
4	Christopher Bell	Kyle Busch Motorsports	Toyota	JBL
5	Korbin Forrister*	Wauters Motorsports	Toyota	Advanced Medical Laboratories
6	Norm Benning	Norm Benning Racing	Chevrolet	Houston Roll Pipe
7	Brett Moffitt	Red Horse Racing	Toyota	Red Horse Racing
8	John Hunter Nemechek	NEMCO Motorsports	Chevrolet	D. A. B. Constructors, Inc.
10	Chuck Buchanan Jr.	Jennifer Jo Cobb Racing	Ford	Spring Drug
12	Jordan Anderson	Rick Ware Racing	Chevrolet	Lucas Oil
13	Cody Coughlin (R)	ThorSport Racing	Toyota	JEGS
16	Ryan Truex	Hattori Racing Enterprises	Toyota	Harris Teeter
17	Timothy Peters	Red Horse Racing	Toyota	Autos By Nelson, Harley-Davidson Thunder Road
18	Noah Gragson (R)	Kyle Busch Motorsports	Toyota	Switch
19	Austin Cindric (R)	Brad Keselowski Racing	Ford	LTi Printing
21	Johnny Sauter	GMS Racing	Chevrolet	Allegiant Air
22	Austin Wayne Self	AM Racing	Toyota	GO TEXAN.
23	Chase Elliott (i)	GMS Racing	Chevrolet	Allegiant Air
24	Justin Haley (R)	GMS Racing	Chevrolet	AccuDoc Solutions
27	Ben Rhodes	ThorSport Racing	Toyota	Safelite Auto Glass
29	Chase Briscoe (R)	Brad Keselowski Racing	Ford	Cooper-Standard
33	Kaz Grala (R)	GMS Racing	Chevrolet	Kiklos
44	Brandon Brown (i)	Martins Motorsports	Chevrolet	Martins Motorsports
45	T. J. Bell	Niece Motorsports	Chevrolet	Autry Grading
49	Wendell Chavous (R)	Premium Motorsports	Chevrolet	Premium Motorsports
50	Travis Kvapil	Beaver Motorsports	Chevrolet	Motorsports Safety Group
51	Harrison Burton	Kyle Busch Motorsports	Toyota	DEX Imaging
52	Stewart Friesen (R)	Halmar Friesen Racing	Chevrolet	Halmar
63	Kyle Donahue	MB Motorsports	Chevrolet	Blue Lives Matter
66	Ross Chastain (i)	Bolen Motorsports	Chevrolet	South Carolina Gamecocks
75	Caleb Holman	Henderson Motorsports	Chevrolet	Food Country USA
83	Donnie Levister	Copp Motorsports	Chevrolet	Frontline Wraps
87	Joe Nemechek	NEMCO Motorsports	Chevrolet	NEMCO Motorsports
88	Matt Crafton	ThorSport Racing	Toyota	Menards, Shasta
92	Regan Smith	RBR Enterprises	Ford	BTS Tire & Wheel Distributors, Advance Auto Parts
98	Grant Enfinger (R)	ThorSport Racing	Toyota	Jive Communications
99	Ty Dillon (i)	MDM Motorsports	Chevrolet	Overkill Motorsports
Official entry list

*Withdrew.

== Practice ==
Originally, two practice sessions were scheduled to be held, both being held on Friday, March 31. However, rain would cancel the second session.

The only 55-minute practice session was held on Friday, March 31, at 1:00 PM EST. Christopher Bell of Kyle Busch Motorsports would set the fastest time in the session, with a lap of 20.204 and an average speed of 93.724 miles per hour (150.834 km/h).

Pos.	#	Driver	Team	Make	Time	Speed
1	4	Christopher Bell	Kyle Busch Motorsports	Toyota	20.204	93.724
2	7	Brett Moffitt	Red Horse Racing	Toyota	20.264	93.447
3	18	Noah Gragson (R)	Kyle Busch Motorsports	Toyota	20.274	93.400
Full practice results

== Qualifying ==
Qualifying was held on Saturday, April 1, at 12:05 PM EST. Since Martinsville Speedway is a short track, the qualifying system was a multi-car system that included three rounds. The first round was 15 minutes, where every driver would be able to set a lap within the 15 minutes. Then, the second round would consist of the fastest 24 cars in Round 1, and drivers would have 10 minutes to set a lap. Round 3 consisted of the fastest 12 drivers from Round 2, and the drivers would have 5 minutes to set a time. Whoever was fastest in Round 3 would win the pole.

Chase Elliott of GMS Racing would win the pole after advancing from both preliminary rounds and setting the fastest lap in Round 3, with a time of 19.943 and an average speed of 94.951 miles per hour (152.809 km/h).

Three drivers would fail to qualify: Austin Wayne Self, Norm Benning, and Chuck Buchanan Jr.

=== Full qualifying results ===
Pos.	#	Driver	Team	Make	Time (R1)	Speed (R1)	Time (R2)	Speed (R2)	Time (R3)	Speed (R3)
1	23	Chase Elliott (i)	GMS Racing	Chevrolet					19.943	94.951
2	21	Johnny Sauter	GMS Racing	Chevrolet					19.974	94.803
3	17	Timothy Peters	Red Horse Racing	Toyota					20.074	94.331
4	88	Matt Crafton	ThorSport Racing	Toyota					20.099	94.214
5	66	Ross Chastain (i)	Bolen Motorsports	Chevrolet					20.168	93.891
6	4	Christopher Bell	Kyle Busch Motorsports	Toyota					20.182	93.826
7	51	Harrison Burton	Kyle Busch Motorsports	Toyota					20.182	93.826
8	29	Chase Briscoe (R)	Brad Keselowski Racing	Ford					20.198	93.752
9	18	Noah Gragson (R)	Kyle Busch Motorsports	Toyota					20.233	93.590
10	98	Grant Enfinger (R)	ThorSport Racing	Toyota					20.244	93.539
11	33	Kaz Grala (R)	GMS Racing	Chevrolet					20.254	93.493
12	8	John Hunter Nemechek	NEMCO Motorsports	Chevrolet					20.268	93.428
Eliminated in Round 2
13	19	Austin Cindric (R)	Brad Keselowski Racing	Ford			20.195	93.766	—	—
14	63	Kyle Donahue	MB Motorsports	Chevrolet			20.219	93.654	—	—
15	7	Brett Moffitt	Red Horse Racing	Toyota			20.222	93.641	—	—
16	99	Ty Dillon (i)	MDM Motorsports	Chevrolet			20.226	93.622	—	—
17	27	Ben Rhodes	ThorSport Racing	Toyota			20.265	93.442	—	—
18	52	Stewart Friesen (R)	Halmar Friesen Racing	Chevrolet			20.266	93.437	—	—
19	16	Ryan Truex	Hattori Racing Enterprises	Toyota			20.273	93.405	—	—
20	92	Regan Smith	RBR Enterprises	Ford			20.276	93.391	—	—
21	87	Joe Nemechek	NEMCO Motorsports	Chevrolet			20.390	92.869	—	—
22	02	Austin Hill	Young's Motorsports	Ford			20.402	92.814	—	—
23	44	Brandon Brown (i)	Martins Motorsports	Chevrolet			20.402	92.814	—	—
24	24	Justin Haley (R)	GMS Racing	Chevrolet	20.356	93.024	—	—	—	—
Eliminated in Round 1
25	75	Caleb Holman	Henderson Motorsports	Chevrolet	20.356	93.024	—	—	—	—
26	45	T. J. Bell	Niece Motorsports	Chevrolet	20.420	92.733	—	—	—	—
27	13	Cody Coughlin (R)	ThorSport Racing	Toyota	20.428	92.696	—	—	—	—
Qualified by owner's points
28	50	Travis Kvapil	Beaver Motorsports	Chevrolet	20.885	90.668	—	—	—	—
29	1	Bryce Napier	TJL Motorsports	Chevrolet	21.137	89.587	—	—	—	—
30	83	Donnie Levister	Copp Motorsports	Chevrolet	21.166	89.464	—	—	—	—
31	49	Wendell Chavous (R)	Premium Motorsports	Chevrolet	21.174	89.430	—	—	—	—
32	12	Jordan Anderson	Rick Ware Racing	Chevrolet	21.995	86.092	—	—	—	—
Failed to qualify or withdrew
33	22	Austin Wayne Self	AM Racing	Toyota	20.488	92.425	—	—	—	—
34	6	Norm Benning	Norm Benning Racing	Chevrolet	20.937	90.443	—	—	—	—
35	10	Chuck Buchanan Jr.	Jennifer Jo Cobb Racing	Ford	—	—	—	—	—	—
WD	5	Korbin Forrister	Wauters Motorsports	Toyota	—	—	—	—	—	—
Official starting lineup

== Race results ==
Stage 1 Laps: 70

Pos.	#	Driver	Team	Make	Pts
1	23	Chase Elliott (i)	GMS Racing	Chevrolet	0
2	21	Johnny Sauter	GMS Racing	Chevrolet	9
3	88	Matt Crafton	ThorSport Racing	Toyota	8
4	4	Christopher Bell	Kyle Busch Motorsports	Toyota	7
5	98	Grant Enfinger (R)	ThorSport Racing	Toyota	6
6	29	Chase Briscoe (R)	Brad Keselowski Racing	Ford	5
7	17	Timothy Peters	Red Horse Racing	Toyota	4
8	18	Noah Gragson (R)	Kyle Busch Motorsports	Toyota	3
9	99	Ty Dillon (i)	MDM Motorsports	Chevrolet	0
10	8	John Hunter Nemechek	NEMCO Motorsports	Chevrolet	1

Stage 2 Laps: 70

Pos.	#	Driver	Team	Make	Pts
1	21	Johnny Sauter	GMS Racing	Chevrolet	10
2	88	Matt Crafton	ThorSport Racing	Toyota	9
3	29	Chase Briscoe (R)	Brad Keselowski Racing	Ford	8
4	17	Timothy Peters	Red Horse Racing	Toyota	7
5	98	Grant Enfinger (R)	ThorSport Racing	Toyota	6
6	24	Justin Haley (R)	GMS Racing	Chevrolet	5
7	51	Harrison Burton	Kyle Busch Motorsports	Toyota	4
8	33	Kaz Grala (R)	GMS Racing	Chevrolet	3
9	4	Christopher Bell	Kyle Busch Motorsports	Toyota	2
10	02	Austin Hill	Young's Motorsports	Ford	1

Stage 3 Laps: 110

Fin	St	#	Driver	Team	Make	Laps	Led	Status	Pts
1	1	23	Chase Elliott (i)	GMS Racing	Chevrolet	250	92	running	0
2	2	21	Johnny Sauter	GMS Racing	Chevrolet	250	62	running	54
3	6	4	Christopher Bell	Kyle Busch Motorsports	Toyota	250	96	running	43
4	9	18	Noah Gragson (R)	Kyle Busch Motorsports	Toyota	250	0	running	36
5	16	99	Ty Dillon (i)	MDM Motorsports	Chevrolet	250	0	running	0
6	15	7	Brett Moffitt	Red Horse Racing	Toyota	250	0	running	31
7	5	66	Ross Chastain (i)	Bolen Motorsports	Chevrolet	250	0	running	0
8	3	17	Timothy Peters	Red Horse Racing	Toyota	250	0	running	40
9	4	88	Matt Crafton	ThorSport Racing	Toyota	250	0	running	45
10	19	16	Ryan Truex	Hattori Racing Enterprises	Toyota	250	0	running	27
11	8	29	Chase Briscoe (R)	Brad Keselowski Racing	Ford	250	0	running	39
12	20	92	Regan Smith	RBR Enterprises	Ford	250	0	running	25
13	7	51	Harrison Burton	Kyle Busch Motorsports	Toyota	250	0	running	28
14	22	02	Austin Hill	Young's Motorsports	Ford	250	0	running	24
15	11	33	Kaz Grala (R)	GMS Racing	Chevrolet	250	0	running	25
16	14	63	Kyle Donahue	MB Motorsports	Chevrolet	250	0	running	21
17	10	98	Grant Enfinger (R)	ThorSport Racing	Toyota	250	0	running	32
18	21	87	Joe Nemechek	NEMCO Motorsports	Chevrolet	250	0	running	19
19	27	13	Cody Coughlin (R)	ThorSport Racing	Toyota	250	0	running	18
20	17	27	Ben Rhodes	ThorSport Racing	Toyota	249	0	running	17
21	13	19	Austin Cindric (R)	Brad Keselowski Racing	Ford	249	0	running	16
22	25	75	Caleb Holman	Henderson Motorsports	Chevrolet	249	0	running	15
23	31	49	Wendell Chavous (R)	Premium Motorsports	Chevrolet	248	0	running	14
24	26	45	T. J. Bell	Niece Motorsports	Chevrolet	247	0	running	13
25	18	52	Stewart Friesen (R)	Halmar Friesen Racing	Chevrolet	247	0	running	12
26	24	24	Justin Haley (R)	GMS Racing	Chevrolet	246	0	running	16
27	23	44	Brandon Brown (i)	Martins Motorsports	Chevrolet	242	0	running	0
28	12	8	John Hunter Nemechek	NEMCO Motorsports	Chevrolet	226	0	running	10
29	28	50	Travis Kvapil	Beaver Motorsports	Chevrolet	186	0	engine	8
30	30	83	Donnie Levister	Copp Motorsports	Chevrolet	100	0	brakes	7
31	32	12	Jordan Anderson	Rick Ware Racing	Chevrolet	24	0	brakes	6
32	29	1	Bryce Napier	TJL Motorsports	Chevrolet	3	0	parked	5
Failed to qualify or withdrew
33		22	Austin Wayne Self	AM Racing	Toyota				
34		6	Norm Benning	Norm Benning Racing	Chevrolet				
35		10	Chuck Buchanan Jr.	Jennifer Jo Cobb Racing	Ford				
WD		5	Korbin Forrister	Wauters Motorsports	Toyota				
Official race results

== Standings after the race ==
Drivers' Championship standings

Pos	Driver	Points
1	Johnny Sauter	140
2	Christopher Bell	136 (-4)
3	Matt Crafton	117 (–23)
4	Timothy Peters	110 (–30)
5	Kaz Grala	103 (–37)
6	Ben Rhodes	103 (–37)
7	Chase Briscoe	93 (–47)
8	Grant Enfinger	84 (–56)
Official driver's standings

- Note: Only the first 8 positions are included for the driver standings.

Previous race: 2017 Active Pest Control 200	NASCAR Camping World Truck Series; 2017 season	Next race: 2017 Toyota Tundra 250
