= 2017 Toyota Tundra 250 =

Fourth race of the 2017 NASCAR Camping World Truck Series

Race details
- Race 4 of 23 of the 2017 NASCAR Camping World Truck Series
- Date: May 12, 2017
- Official name: 17th Annual Toyota Tundra 250
- Location: Kansas City, Kansas, Kansas Speedway
- Course: Permanent racing facility
- Course length: 1.5 miles (2.41 km)
- Distance: 167 laps, 250.5 mi (403.14 km)
- Scheduled distance: 167 laps, 250.5 mi (403.14 km)
- Average speed: 108.468 miles per hour (174.562 km/h)

Pole position
Driver	Christopher Bell	Kyle Busch Motorsports
- Time: 30.363

Most laps led
Driver	Kyle Busch	Kyle Busch Motorsports
- Laps: 91

Winner
No. 51	Kyle Busch	Kyle Busch Motorsports

Television in the United States
- Network: Fox Sports 1
- Announcers: Vince Welch, Phil Parsons, Michael Waltrip

Radio in the United States
- Radio: Motor Racing Network

The 2017 Toyota Tundra 250 was the fourth stock car race of the 2017 NASCAR Camping World Truck Series and the 17th iteration of the event. The race was held on Friday, May 12, 2017, in Kansas City, Kansas at Kansas Speedway, a 1.5 miles (2.4 km) permanent D-shaped oval racetrack. The race took the scheduled 167 laps to complete. At race's end, Kyle Busch, driving for Kyle Busch Motorsports, would inherit the win after leader Ben Rhodes would blow an engine with six to go. The win was Busch's 47th career NASCAR Camping World Truck Series win and his first of the season. To fill out the podium, Johnny Sauter of GMS Racing and John Hunter Nemechek of NEMCO Motorsports would finish second and third, respectively.

== Background ==
The layout of Kansas Speedway, the venue where the race was held.

Kansas Speedway is a 1.5-mile (2.4 km) tri-oval race track in Kansas City, Kansas. It was built in 2001 and hosts two annual NASCAR race weekends. The NTT IndyCar Series also raced there until 2011. The speedway is owned and operated by the International Speedway Corporation.

=== Entry list ===
- (R) denotes rookie driver.
- (i) denotes driver who is ineligible for series driver points.

#	Driver	Team	Make	Sponsor
1	Jordan Anderson	TJL Motorsports	Chevrolet	Jordan Anderson Racing "Fueled by Fans"
02	Tyler Young	Young's Motorsports	Chevrolet	Randco Industries, Young's Building Systems
4	Christopher Bell	Kyle Busch Motorsports	Toyota	SiriusXM
6	Norm Benning	Norm Benning Racing	Chevrolet	Houston Roll Pipe
7	Brett Moffitt	Red Horse Racing	Toyota	Red Horse Racing
8	John Hunter Nemechek	NEMCO Motorsports	Chevrolet	Fire Alarm Services
10	Jennifer Jo Cobb	Jennifer Jo Cobb Racing	Chevrolet	Driven 2 Honor, Mark One Electric
12	Spencer Boyd	Rick Ware Racing	Chevrolet	Grunt Style "This We'll Defend"
13	Cody Coughlin (R)	ThorSport Racing	Toyota	JEGS
16	Ryan Truex	Hattori Racing Enterprises	Toyota	SeaWatch International, Bar Harbor
17	Timothy Peters	Red Horse Racing	Toyota	Red Horse Racing
18	Noah Gragson (R)	Kyle Busch Motorsports	Toyota	Switch
19	Austin Cindric (R)	Brad Keselowski Racing	Ford	Pirtek
21	Johnny Sauter	GMS Racing	Chevrolet	Allegiant Air
24	Justin Haley (R)	GMS Racing	Chevrolet	Fraternal Order of Eagles
27	Ben Rhodes	ThorSport Racing	Toyota	Safelite Auto Glass
29	Chase Briscoe (R)	Brad Keselowski Racing	Ford	Cooper-Standard
33	Kaz Grala (R)	GMS Racing	Chevrolet	Kiklos
36	Camden Murphy	Copp Motorsports	Chevrolet	Copp Motorsports
44	Matt Mills (i)	Faith Motorsports	Chevrolet	Sparrow Ranch On The Island
45	Austin Wayne Self	Niece Motorsports	Chevrolet	Precision Air Technology
49	Wendell Chavous (R)	Premium Motorsports	Chevrolet	Premium Motorsports
50	Cody Ware (i)	Beaver Motorsports	Chevrolet	Beaver Motorsports
51	Kyle Busch (i)	Kyle Busch Motorsports	Toyota	Cessna, Beechcraft
52	Stewart Friesen (R)	Halmar Friesen Racing	Chevrolet	Halmar
63	Kyle Donahue	MB Motorsports	Chevrolet	Blue Lives Matter
66	Ross Chastain (i)	Bolen Motorsports	Chevrolet	Bolen Motorsports
83	Todd Peck	Copp Motorsports	Chevrolet	TDS Wraps
88	Matt Crafton	ThorSport Racing	Toyota	Menards, Matador Jerky
92	Regan Smith	RBR Enterprises	Ford	BTS Tire & Wheel Distributors, Advance Auto Parts
98	Grant Enfinger (R)	ThorSport Racing	Toyota	RIDE TV
99	Travis Miller	MDM Motorsports	Chevrolet	MDM Motorsports
Official entry list

== Practice ==
=== First practice ===
The first practice session was held on Thursday, May 11, at 2:00 PM CST, and would last for 55 minutes. Justin Haley of GMS Racing would set the fastest time in the session, with a lap of 30.297 and an average speed of 178.235 miles per hour (286.841 km/h).

Pos.	#	Driver	Team	Make	Time	Speed
1	24	Justin Haley (R)	GMS Racing	Chevrolet	30.297	178.235
2	4	Christopher Bell	Kyle Busch Motorsports	Toyota	30.432	177.445
3	21	Johnny Sauter	GMS Racing	Chevrolet	30.435	177.427
Full first practice results

=== Second and final practice ===
The second and final practice session, sometimes referred to as Happy Hour, was held on Thursday, May 11, at 4:00 PM CST, and would last for 55 minutes. Christopher Bell of Kyle Busch Motorsports would set the fastest time in the session, with a lap of 30.272 and an average speed of 178.383 miles per hour (287.080 km/h).

Pos.	#	Driver	Team	Make	Time	Speed
1	4	Christopher Bell	Kyle Busch Motorsports	Toyota	30.272	178.383
2	88	Matt Crafton	ThorSport Racing	Toyota	30.418	177.526
3	33	Kaz Grala (R)	GMS Racing	Chevrolet	30.437	177.416
Full Happy Hour practice results

== Qualifying ==
Qualifying was held on Friday, May 12, at 3:35 PM CST. Since Kansas Speedway is at least a 1.5 miles (2.4 km) racetrack, the qualifying system was a single car, single lap, two round system where in the first round, everyone would set a time to determine positions 13–32. Then, the fastest 12 qualifiers would move on to the second round to determine positions 1–12.

Christopher Bell of Kyle Busch Motorsports would win the pole, setting a lap of 30.363 and an average speed of 177.848 miles per hour (286.219 km/h) in the second round.

No drivers would fail to qualify.

=== Full qualifying results ===
Pos.	#	Driver	Team	Make	Time (R1)	Speed (R1)	Time (R2)	Speed (R2)
1	4	Christopher Bell	Kyle Busch Motorsports	Toyota	30.528	176.887	30.363	177.848
2	88	Matt Crafton	ThorSport Racing	Toyota	30.514	176.968	30.477	177.183
3	21	Johnny Sauter	GMS Racing	Chevrolet	30.534	176.852	30.549	176.765
4	18	Noah Gragson (R)	Kyle Busch Motorsports	Toyota	30.714	175.816	30.566	176.667
5	16	Ryan Truex	Hattori Racing Enterprises	Toyota	30.610	176.413	30.612	176.401
6	33	Kaz Grala (R)	GMS Racing	Chevrolet	30.545	176.788	30.625	176.327
7	7	Brett Moffitt	Red Horse Racing	Toyota	30.542	176.806	30.648	176.194
8	27	Ben Rhodes	ThorSport Racing	Toyota	30.725	175.753	30.729	175.730
9	17	Timothy Peters	Red Horse Racing	Toyota	30.653	176.165	30.753	175.593
10	51	Kyle Busch (i)	Kyle Busch Motorsports	Toyota	30.711	175.833	30.793	175.365
11	29	Chase Briscoe (R)	Brad Keselowski Racing	Ford	30.762	175.541	30.802	175.313
12	24	Justin Haley (R)	GMS Racing	Chevrolet	30.679	176.016	30.815	175.239
Eliminated in Round 1
13	13	Cody Coughlin (R)	ThorSport Racing	Toyota	30.791	175.376	—	—
14	8	John Hunter Nemechek	NEMCO Motorsports	Chevrolet	30.800	175.325	—	—
15	98	Grant Enfinger (R)	ThorSport Racing	Toyota	30.803	175.308	—	—
16	19	Austin Cindric (R)	Brad Keselowski Racing	Ford	30.813	175.251	—	—
17	99	Travis Miller	MDM Motorsports	Chevrolet	30.853	175.023	—	—
18	92	Regan Smith	RBR Enterprises	Ford	30.936	174.554	—	—
19	02	Tyler Young	Young's Motorsports	Chevrolet	31.094	173.667	—	—
20	66	Ross Chastain (i)	Bolen Motorsports	Chevrolet	31.223	172.949	—	—
21	45	Austin Wayne Self	Niece Motorsports	Chevrolet	31.410	171.920	—	—
22	52	Stewart Friesen (R)	Halmar Friesen Racing	Chevrolet	31.448	171.712	—	—
23	63	Kevin Donahue	MB Motorsports	Chevrolet	31.909	169.231	—	—
24	1	Jordan Anderson	TJL Motorsports	Chevrolet	31.993	168.787	—	—
25	44	Matt Mills (i)	Faith Motorsports	Chevrolet	32.006	168.718	—	—
26	36	Camden Murphy	Copp Motorsports	Chevrolet	32.705	165.112	—	—
27	6	Norm Benning	Norm Benning Racing	Chevrolet	32.955	163.860	—	—
28	10	Jennifer Jo Cobb	Jennifer Jo Cobb Racing	Chevrolet	33.062	163.330	—	—
29	49	Wendell Chavous (R)	Premium Motorsports	Chevrolet	33.851	159.523	—	—
30	12	Spencer Boyd	Rick Ware Racing	Chevrolet	34.426	156.858	—	—
31	83	Todd Peck	Copp Motorsports	Chevrolet	—	—	—	—
32	50	Cody Ware (i)	Beaver Motorsports	Chevrolet	—	—	—	—
Official qualifying results
Official starting lineup

== Race results ==
Stage 1 Laps: 40

Pos.	#	Driver	Team	Make	Pts
1	51	Kyle Busch (i)	Kyle Busch Motorsports	Toyota	0
2	4	Christopher Bell	Kyle Busch Motorsports	Toyota	9
3	21	Johnny Sauter	GMS Racing	Chevrolet	8
4	8	John Hunter Nemechek	NEMCO Motorsports	Chevrolet	7
5	88	Matt Crafton	ThorSport Racing	Toyota	6
6	16	Ryan Truex	Hattori Racing Enterprises	Toyota	5
7	27	Ben Rhodes	ThorSport Racing	Toyota	4
8	29	Chase Briscoe (R)	Brad Keselowski Racing	Ford	3
9	98	Grant Enfinger (R)	ThorSport Racing	Toyota	2
10	7	Brett Moffitt	Red Horse Racing	Toyota	1

Stage 2 Laps: 40

Pos.	#	Driver	Team	Make	Pts
1	51	Kyle Busch (i)	Kyle Busch Motorsports	Toyota	0
2	4	Christopher Bell	Kyle Busch Motorsports	Toyota	9
3	27	Ben Rhodes	ThorSport Racing	Toyota	8
4	29	Chase Briscoe (R)	Brad Keselowski Racing	Ford	7
5	21	Johnny Sauter	GMS Racing	Chevrolet	6
6	98	Grant Enfinger (R)	ThorSport Racing	Toyota	5
7	8	John Hunter Nemechek	NEMCO Motorsports	Chevrolet	4
8	7	Brett Moffitt	Red Horse Racing	Toyota	3
9	16	Ryan Truex	Hattori Racing Enterprises	Toyota	2
10	88	Matt Crafton	ThorSport Racing	Toyota	1

Stage 3 Laps: 87

Fin	St	#	Driver	Team	Make	Laps	Led	Status	Pts
1	10	51	Kyle Busch (i)	Kyle Busch Motorsports	Toyota	167	91	running	0
2	3	21	Johnny Sauter	GMS Racing	Chevrolet	167	0	running	49
3	14	8	John Hunter Nemechek	NEMCO Motorsports	Chevrolet	167	0	running	45
4	1	4	Christopher Bell	Kyle Busch Motorsports	Toyota	167	37	running	51
5	11	29	Chase Briscoe (R)	Brad Keselowski Racing	Ford	167	0	running	42
6	5	16	Ryan Truex	Hattori Racing Enterprises	Toyota	167	0	running	38
7	7	7	Brett Moffitt	Red Horse Racing	Toyota	167	0	running	34
8	6	33	Kaz Grala (R)	GMS Racing	Chevrolet	167	0	running	29
9	12	24	Justin Haley (R)	GMS Racing	Chevrolet	167	0	running	28
10	16	19	Austin Cindric (R)	Brad Keselowski Racing	Ford	167	0	running	27
11	15	98	Grant Enfinger (R)	ThorSport Racing	Toyota	167	14	running	33
12	18	92	Regan Smith	RBR Enterprises	Ford	167	0	running	25
13	9	17	Timothy Peters	Red Horse Racing	Toyota	167	0	running	24
14	19	02	Tyler Young	Young's Motorsports	Chevrolet	167	0	running	23
15	21	45	Austin Wayne Self	Niece Motorsports	Chevrolet	166	0	running	22
16	2	88	Matt Crafton	ThorSport Racing	Toyota	166	0	running	28
17	25	44	Matt Mills (i)	Faith Motorsports	Chevrolet	165	0	running	0
18	20	66	Ross Chastain (i)	Bolen Motorsports	Chevrolet	164	0	running	0
19	24	1	Jordan Anderson	TJL Motorsports	Chevrolet	163	0	running	18
20	30	12	Spencer Boyd	Rick Ware Racing	Chevrolet	163	0	running	17
21	23	63	Kevin Donahue	MB Motorsports	Chevrolet	163	0	running	16
22	32	50	Cody Ware (i)	Beaver Motorsports	Chevrolet	162	0	running	0
23	8	27	Ben Rhodes	ThorSport Racing	Toyota	160	25	engine	26
24	27	6	Norm Benning	Norm Benning Racing	Chevrolet	160	0	running	13
25	17	99	Travis Miller	MDM Motorsports	Chevrolet	109	0	vibration	12
26	13	13	Cody Coughlin (R)	ThorSport Racing	Toyota	84	0	transmission	11
27	28	10	Jennifer Jo Cobb	Jennifer Jo Cobb Racing	Chevrolet	82	0	brakes	10
28	4	18	Noah Gragson (R)	Kyle Busch Motorsports	Toyota	68	0	clutch	9
29	31	83	Todd Peck	Copp Motorsports	Chevrolet	29	0	brakes	8
30	26	36	Camden Murphy	Copp Motorsports	Chevrolet	27	0	electrical	7
31	29	49	Wendell Chavous (R)	Premium Motorsports	Chevrolet	21	0	crash	6
32	22	52	Stewart Friesen (R)	Halmar Friesen Racing	Chevrolet	16	0	crash	5
Official race results

== Standings after the race ==
Drivers' Championship standings

Pos	Driver	Points
1	Johnny Sauter	189
2	Christopher Bell	187 (-2)
3	Matt Crafton	145 (–44)
4	Chase Briscoe	135 (–54)
5	Timothy Peters	134 (–55)
6	Kaz Grala	132 (–57)
7	Ben Rhodes	129 (–60)
8	Grant Enfinger	117 (–72)
Official driver's standings

- Note: Only the first 8 positions are included for the driver standings.

Previous race: 2017 Alpha Energy Solutions 250	NASCAR Camping World Truck Series; 2017 season	Next race: 2017 North Carolina Education Lottery 200
