= Copp Motorsports =

American auto racing team

- Owner: D. J. Copp
- Series: CARS Pro Late Model Tour
- Race drivers: CARS Pro Late Model Tour: 83. Bayley Currey, E. J. Tamayo
- Manufacturer: Dodge
- Opened: 2017

Career
- Debut: Truck Series: 2017 NextEra Energy Resources 250 (Daytona); CARS Pro Late Model Tour: 2026 Throwback Classic (Hickory)
- Latest race: Truck Series: 2019 Strat 200 (Las Vegas); CARS Pro Late Model Tour: 2026 Cook Out 225 (Florence)
- Races competed: Total: 52; Truck Series: 49; CARS Pro Late Model Tour: 2
- Drivers' Championships: 0
- Race victories: 0
- Pole positions: 0

Copp Motorsports is an American professional stock car racing team that competes in the CARS Pro Late Model Tour. The team is owned by D. J. Copp and formerly fielded entries in the NASCAR Craftsman Truck Series from 2017 to 2019.

== History ==
During the early part of 2017, D. J. Copp bought the assets of the race team an acquaintance of his, Carlos Contreras, owned. Copp renumbered the trucks from the Contreras No. 71 to the traditional Copp family number, No. 83. In the beginning of the 2017 season, Copp and his wife were the only two full-time employees of the team.

On August 6, 2019, Copp announced that the future of the team is uncertain, commenting that "some people make it hard to love the sanctioning body".

== Truck Series ==
=== Partnerships ===
Early in the 2017 NASCAR Camping World Truck Series season, Copp formed a partnership with MB Motorsports, fielding the No. 36 for Camden Murphy with MB owner Mike Mittler as crew chief. The following week, Murphy was shuffled out of MB's No. 63 at Charlotte to make room for Todd Peck, who ran what appeared to be the Daytona truck renumbered to 63 and still under the MB banner in owner points.

=== Truck No. 36 history ===
To complete the 32-truck field, Copp Motorsports fielded a second truck No. 36 in partnership with MB Motorsports for Camden Murphy at Kansas in 2017. The truck returned at Dover with J. J. Yeley behind the wheel. Murphy and B.J. McLeod would both make two more starts in the No. 36 Copp truck that season.

=== Truck No. 63 history ===
In 2019, the team decided to run the No. 63 for the whole season in memory of Mike Mittler, who died on May 10, 2019.

==== Truck No. 63 results ====
Year	Driver	No.	Make	1	2	3	4	5	6	7	8	9	10	11	12	13	14	15	16	17	18	19	20	21	22	23	Owners	Pts
2019	Bobby Gerhart	63	Chevy	DAY; 11																							50th	37
2019	Timmy Hill	63	Chevy		ATL; 31																						50th	37
2019	Scott Stenzel	63	Chevy			LVS; 32																					50th	37
2019	Dawson Cram	63	Chevy				MAR; DNQ	TEX	DOV	KAN	CLT	TEX	IOW	GTW	CHI	KEN	POC	ELD	MCH	BRI	MSP	LVS	TAL	MAR	PHO	HOM	50th	37

=== Truck No. 83 history ===
In 2017, D. J. Copp, a former dirt racer-turned-tire changer and crew chief, bought Contreras Motorsports and renumbered the No. 71 to the No. 83. Copp's family racing history was the driving force behind changing the number to 83. They made their first start with Todd Peck driving at Daytona International Speedway in the NextEra Energy Resources 250. In their first start, they finished 18th. Peck stayed with the team for the next race, but retired early with overheating issues. Donnie Levister then made his first Camping World Truck Series race with the team at Martinsville, but again the truck fell victim to mechanical issues. Due to lack of sponsorship, the team started and parked in most of the races.

On March 15, 2017, it was announced that former drag racer Salvatore Iovino would pilot the Copp Motorsports entry full time in 2018, though the truck number may not be 83, however, the deal fell through and Scott Stenzel, Bayley Currey, and Kyle Donahue now drive the 83. Mike Senica made one start for Copp Motorsports in June 2017 at Iowa Speedway in the M&M's 200 NASCAR Camping World Truck Series. He started 33rd and finished 21st.

==== Truck No. 83 results ====
Year	Driver	No.	Make	1	2	3	4	5	6	7	8	9	10	11	12	13	14	15	16	17	18	19	20	21	22	23	Owners	Pts
2017	Todd Peck	83	Chevy	DAY; 18	ATL; 32		KAN; 29		DOV; 31	TEX; 24					POC; 19	MCH; 28											22nd	346
2017	Donnie Levister	83	Chevy			MAR; 30																					22nd	346
2017	J.J. Yeley	83	Chevy					CLT; 15					KEN; 17	ELD; 21			BRI; 19										22nd	346
2017	Camden Murphy	83	Chevy								GTW; 23							MSP; 22	CHI; 22		LVS; 17						22nd	346
2017	Mike Senica	83	Chevy									IOW; 21															22nd	346
2017	Patrick Emerling	83	Chevy																	NHA; 23				TEX; 26			22nd	346
2017	Spencer Boyd	83	Chevy																			TAL; 13					22nd	346
2017	Landon Huffman	83	Chevy																				MAR; 17				22nd	346
2017	Bayley Currey	83	Chevy																						PHO; 10	HOM; 28	22nd	346
2018	Scott Stenzel	83	Chevy	DAY; 15	ATL; 32																						24th	279
2018	Bayley Currey	83	Chevy			LVS; 20		DOV; 26		CLT; 25	TEX; 29	IOW; 24		CHI; 27				MCH; 27	BRI; 32	MSP	LVS; 16			TEX; 23			24th	279
2018	Kyle Donahue	83	Chevy				MAR; 23		KAN; 20																		24th	279
2018	Tyler Matthews	83	Chevy										GTW; 17		KEN; 32												24th	279
2018	Nick Hoffman	83	Chevy													ELD; 10											24th	279
2018	Todd Peck	83	Chevy														POC; 23									HOM; Wth	24th	279
2018	Joey Gase	83	Chevy																			TAL; DNQ					24th	279
2018	Dawson Cram	83	Chevy																				MAR; 24		PHO; 16		24th	279

== CARS Tour ==
=== Car No. 83 history ===
Copp's No. 83 car at Hickory in 2026.

In August 2026, the team would reopen its doors, introducing former driver for the team, Bayley Currey back into the operation. The team would start 19th at Hickory for the Throwback Classic with the CARS Tour, and finish in ninth.

=== CARS Pro Late Model Tour ===
(key)

CARS Pro Late Model Tour results
Year	Driver(s)	No.	Make	1	2	3	4	5	6	7	8	9	10	11	CPLMTC	Pts	Ref
2026	Bayley Currey	83	Dodge	SNM	NSV	CRW	ACE	NWS	HCY; 9	AND	FLC; 18				-*	-*	
2026	E. J. Tamayo	83	Dodge									TCM; Wth	NPS	SBO	-*	-*	
