= Bolen Motorsports =

American stock car racing team

- Owner: Jeff Bolen
- Base: Mooresville, North Carolina
- Series: Camping World Truck Series
- Race drivers: 66. Ross Chastain, Travis Kvapil, Trey Hutchens, Ken Schrader, Justin Fontaine, Jason Hathaway, Vinnie Miller
- Manufacturer: Chevrolet
- Opened: 2016
- Closed: 2017

Career
- Debut: 2016 NextEra Energy Resources 250 (Daytona)
- Latest race: 2017 Fred's 250 (Talladega)
- Races competed: 35
- Drivers' Championships: 0
- Race victories: 0
- Pole positions: 0

Bolen Motorsports was an American professional stock car racing team that competed part-time in the NASCAR Camping World Truck Series. The team fielded the No. 66 Chevrolet Silverado for Jordan Anderson, Ross Chastain, Travis Kvapil, Trey Hutchens, Ken Schrader, Justin Fontaine, Jason Hathaway and Vinnie Miller.

== Founding ==
Owner Jeff Bolen (a former amateur driver himself) had met driver Jordan Anderson in various levels of racing, including two Camping World Truck Series events in 2015. Bolen contacted Anderson in the 2015 off-season about forming a team together, and they unveiled the team, along with sponsor Columbia, South Carolina (Anderson's hometown), at Darlington Raceway on January 27, 2016.

== Camping World Truck Series ==
=== Truck No. 66 history ===
The team debuted in the 2016 NextEra Energy Resources 250 at Daytona International Speedway with Jordan Anderson behind the wheel. Due to rear gear problems, the team was dropped to 30th that race. The team continued with Anderson for most of the season, with a best finish of 11th at Gateway Motorsports Park, then the team substituted in drivers like Tim Viens, Ross Chastain, Josh Reeves, and Austin Wayne Self. The team led one lap in its first year (Anderson at Gateway), and finished 24th in owner points.

Near the end of the 2016 offseason, Bolen Motorsports announced that Anderson would not pilot the No. 66 in 2017. Naming drivers on a week-to-week basis, the 66 truck was driven by Ross Chastain, who had run the Talladega Superspeedway race in 2016 for Bolen. After getting caught up in a large second-lap melee at Daytona, Chastain handed the team its first top ten finish, a tenth at Atlanta Motor Speedway driving an unsponsored truck. Chastain has tried to find a full-time driver for the truck after the Atlanta race. Unable to do so, Chastain again returned at Martinsville Speedway, this time with a special paint scheme from team owner Bolen's alma mater, the University of South Carolina, commemorating the school's success in both men's and women's basketball. After running Chastain in a number of companion events with the Xfinity Series, the team started a variable driver rotation based on lack of funding during crossover weekends, bringing in Travis Kvapil, Trey Hutchens, and Ken Schrader in to drive. However, when sponsorship dried up, the team abandoned its full-time schedule, instead running its next race in a partnership with AM Racing with its equipment and AM development driver Justin Fontaine behind the wheel. After that race, the only three possible races for the team in 2017 were upcoming events at Canadian Tire Motorsport Park, Martinsville Speedway and Phoenix International Raceway. Jason Hathaway, a regular NASCAR Pinty's Series competitor, drove the truck to a 15th place finish at Canada. The team added another race to its schedule when Vinnie Miller joined the team for the Talladega Superspeedway race.

The team has not raced since 2017.

==== Truck No. 66 results ====
Year	Driver	No.	Make	1	2	3	4	5	6	7	8	9	10	11	12	13	14	15	16	17	18	19	20	21	22	23	NCWTC	Pts
2016	Jordan Anderson	66	Chevy	DAY; 30	ATL; DNQ	MAR; DNQ	KAN; 29	DOV; 18	CLT; 24	TEX; 22	IOW; 20	GTW; 11	KEN; 17	ELD; 32	POC; 14	BRI; 16	MCH; 14	MSP; 13	CHI; 23	NHA; 22				TEX; 25		HOM; 24	24th	246
2016	Tim Viens	66	Chevy																		LVS; 29						24th	246
2016	Ross Chastain	66	Chevy																			TAL; 15					24th	246
2016	Josh Reeves	66	Chevy																				MAR; 28				24th	246
2016	Austin Wayne Self	66	Toyota																						PHO; 22		24th	246
2017	Ross Chastain	66	Chevy	DAY; 30	ATL; 10	MAR; 7	KAN; 18	CLT; 19	DOV; 15				KEN; 13														25th	311
2017	Travis Kvapil	66	Chevy							TEX; 11	GTW; 27																25th	311
2017	Trey Hutchens	66	Chevy									IOW; 16															25th	311
2017	Ken Schrader	66	Chevy											ELD; 17													25th	311
2017	Justin Fontaine	66	Toyota												POC; 15	MCH	BRI										25th	311
2017	Jason Hathaway	66	Chevy															MSP; 15	CHI	NHA	LVS						25th	311
2017	Vinnie Miller	66	Chevy																			TAL; 7	MAR	TEX	PHO	HOM	25th	311
