= Cody Coughlin =

American racing driver (born 1995)

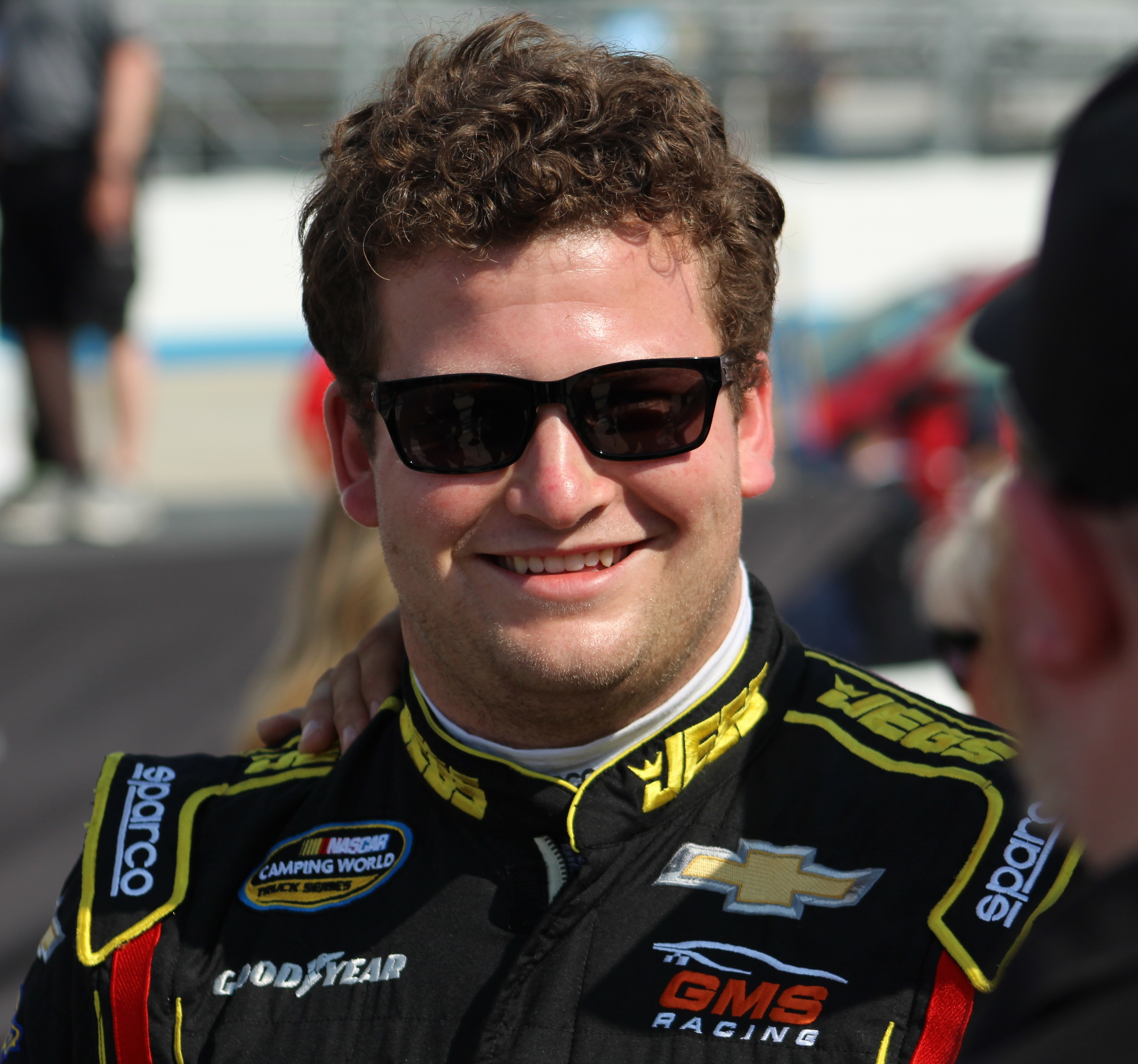
- Coughlin at Dover International Speedway in 2018
- Born: December 11, 1995 (age 30); Delaware, Ohio, U.S.
- Achievements: 2016 ARCA/CRA Super Series Champion; 2013, 2016, 2020, 2021 JEGS/CRA All-Stars Tour Champion
- Awards: 2011 JEGS/CRA All-Stars Rookie of the Year

NASCAR FedEx Freight Truck Series career
- 53 races run over 4 years
- 2018 position: 13th
- Best finish: 13th (2017, 2018)
- First race: 2015 UNOH 225 (Kentucky)
- Last race: 2018 World of Westgate 200 (Las Vegas)
Wins	Top tens	Poles
0	9	0

ARCA Menards Series career
- 24 races run over 4 years
- Best finish: 14th (2014)
- First race: 2014 ARCA Mobile 200 (Mobile)
- Last race: 2023 Sioux Chief Fast Track 150 (Kansas)
Wins	Top tens	Poles
0	15	0
- Statistics up to date as of May 24, 2024.

Cody Coughlin (born December 11, 1995) is an American professional drag and stock car racing driver. He competes in the National Hot Rod Association's Pro Stock class for KB Titan Racing, and part-time in the ARCA/CRA Super Series and CARS Pro Late Model Tour for his family team Coughlin Brothers Racing. He has also competed in the NASCAR Camping World Truck Series and ARCA Menards Series in the past.

== Racing career ==
Coughlin started his career in drag racing, competing in the National Hot Rod Association's Jr. Drag Racing League, but eventually switched to oval track racing. He began in USAC quarter midgets, winning five races in 2009. The following year, he switched to Late models, and joined the JEGS/CRA All-Stars in 2011. In eleven races, Coughlin finished in the top ten in all but one, while also recording four top-five finishes with a best finish of second at Rockford Speedway. He was later named the series' Rookie of the Year. In 2013, he won the series championship.

On March 5, 2014, Coughlin was signed to Joe Gibbs Racing's driver development program.

In March 2014, Coughlin joined Venturini Motorsports for an ARCA Racing Series test at Motor Mile Speedway, followed by another test at Mobile International Speedway, and he made his series debut at the latter on March 22. After qualifying eighth, he finished 13th. He made ten more starts in the season, with a best finish of fourth at Kansas Speedway and Kentucky Speedway. In 2015, he won his first career ARCA pole at Talladega Superspeedway, the first pole at the track for Venturini since 2013, with a lap speed of 187.883 miles per hour (302.368 km/h). On the green–white–checker finish, he finished second after a three-wide battle to the finish.

On July 9, 2015, Coughlin made his Camping World Truck Series debut at Kentucky, driving the No. 25 Toyota Tundra for Venturini Motorsports. Due to rain canceling practice and qualifying, he never turned a lap around the track until the race, where he finished 20th. He later debuted for Kyle Busch Motorsports at Michigan International Speedway, driving the No. 54 Tundra, where he finished 20th after being involved in a late wreck with Ben Kennedy.

In 2016, Coughlin drove for KBM in the No. 18 Tundra for one race at Daytona International Speedway, while also running ten races in the No. 51, splitting the truck with Daniel Suárez. At the Texas Motor Speedway race, Coughlin took over for John Wes Townley in the No. 05 Chevrolet Silverado of Athenian Motorsports while Townley was nursing an ankle injury.

On January 30, 2017, Coughlin joined ThorSport Racing full-time, driving the No. 13 Toyota and bringing JEGS over to sponsor him.

For 2018, Coughlin joined GMS Racing to drive their No. 2 truck full-time. However, on September 24, he was released due to sponsorship issues.

After being unable to find a ride in NASCAR after being released from GMS, Coughlin returned to regional pro late model racing.

On August 2, 2022, it was revealed that Coughlin would return to ARCA to drive in the race at Michigan. It was his first start in the series since 2015 and first start in NASCAR since 2018.

Coughlin entered the NHRA Pro Stock class in 2025 for KB Titan Racing.

== Personal life ==
In his family, Coughlin is a third-generation racer. Coughlin's grandfather Jeg Coughlin Sr. founded Jegs High Performance, with Jeg and relatives like Cody's father John competing in drag racing; uncle Jeg Jr. is also a drag racer.

Coughlin began to work in real estate development after he was unable to find another full-time ride in NASCAR after being released from GMS Racing. He helped plan the building of an apartment complex near New Albany, Ohio in 2022.

== In media ==
Coughlin makes a cameo appearance in the 2018 film God Bless the Broken Road. For that year's Truck race at Michigan International Speedway, he ran a paint scheme promoting the movie.

== Motorsports career results ==
=== NASCAR ===
(key) (Bold – Pole position awarded by qualifying time. Italics – Pole position earned by points standings or practice time. * – Most laps led.)

==== Camping World Truck Series ====
NASCAR Camping World Truck Series results
Year	Team	No.	Make	1	2	3	4	5	6	7	8	9	10	11	12	13	14	15	16	17	18	19	20	21	22	23	NCWTC	Pts	Ref
2015	Venturini Motorsports	25	Toyota	DAY	ATL	MAR	KAN	CLT	DOV	TEX	GTW	IOW	KEN; 20	ELD	POC												52nd	48	
2015	Kyle Busch Motorsports	54	Toyota													MCH; 20	BRI	MSP	CHI	NHA	LVS	TAL	MAR	TEX	PHO	HOM	52nd	48	
2016	Kyle Busch Motorsports	18	Toyota	DAY; 31	ATL	MAR																					29th	113	
2016	Kyle Busch Motorsports	51	Toyota				KAN; 27	DOV	CLT	TEX; 12	IOW	GTW	KEN	ELD; 19	POC; 13	BRI	MCH; 20	MSP	CHI	NHA; 20	LVS; 17	TAL; 31	MAR				29th	113	
2016	Athenian Motorsports	05	Chevy																					TEX; 28	PHO	HOM	29th	113	
2017	ThorSport Racing	13	Toyota	DAY; 11	ATL; 16	MAR; 19	KAN; 26	CLT; 16	DOV; 16	TEX; 18	GTW; 12	IOW; 12	KEN; 15	ELD; 11	POC; 8	MCH; 21	BRI; 17	MSP; 21	CHI; 11	NHA; 17	LVS; 6	TAL; 25	MAR; 20	TEX; 16	PHO; 3	HOM; 14	13th	511	
2018	GMS Racing	2	Chevy	DAY; 17	ATL; 20	LVS; 8	MAR; 26	DOV; 6	KAN; 7	CLT; 17	TEX; 8	IOW; 7	GTW; 9	CHI; 12	KEN; 12	ELD; 28	POC; 14	MCH; 14	BRI; 19	MSP; 15	LVS; 24	TAL	MAR	TEX	PHO	HOM	13th	433	

=== ARCA Menards Series ===
(key) (Bold – Pole position awarded by qualifying time. Italics – Pole position earned by points standings or practice time. * – Most laps led.)

ARCA Menards Series results
Year	Team	No.	Make	1	2	3	4	5	6	7	8	9	10	11	12	13	14	15	16	17	18	19	20	AMSC	Pts	Ref
2014	Venturini Motorsports	55	Toyota	DAY	MOB; 13	SLM; 9	TAL	TOL; 6	NJE	POC; 9	MCH; 13	ELK	WIN; 7	CHI; 5	IRP; 11	POC; 9	BLN	ISF	MAD	DSF	SLM	KEN; 4	KAN; 4	14th	2080	
2015	Venturini Motorsports	55	Toyota	DAY; 4	MOB	NSH	SLM	**TAL**; 2	TOL	NJE; 6	POC; 12	MCH; 14	**CHI**; 26	WIN	IOW	IRP	POC	BLN	ISF	DSF	SLM	KEN	KAN	28th	985	
2022	Coughlin Brothers Racing	72	Ford	DAY	PHO	TAL	KAN	CLT	IOW	BLN	ELK	MOH	POC	IRP	MCH; 8	GLN	ISF	MLW	DSF	KAN; 15	BRI	SLM	TOL	52nd	66	
2023	Coughlin Brothers Racing	72	Ford	DAY	PHO	TAL	KAN; 7	CLT; 28	BLN	ELK	MOH	IOW	POC; 8	MCH; 8	IRP	GLN	ISF	MLW	DSF	KAN; 11	BRI	SLM	TOL	28th	158	

=== CARS Super Late Model Tour ===
(key)

CARS Super Late Model Tour results
Year	Team	No.	Make	1	2	3	4	5	6	7	8	CSLMTC	Pts	Ref
2020	John Coughlin	1	Chevy	SNM	HCY	JEN; 24	HCY	FCS				N/A	0	
2020	John Coughlin	1C	Chevy						BRI; 14	FLC	NSH	N/A	0	
2021	John Coughlin	1	Chevy	HCY	GPS	NSH; 9	JEN	HCY	MMS	TCM	SBO	N/A	0	

=== ASA STARS National Tour ===
(key) (Bold – Pole position awarded by qualifying time. Italics – Pole position earned by points standings or practice time. * – Most laps led. ** – All laps led.)

ASA STARS National Tour results
Year	Team	No.	Make	1	2	3	4	5	6	7	8	9	10	ASNTC	Pts	Ref
2024	Anthony Campi Racing	72	N/A	NSM	FIF	HCY	MAD	MLW	AND; 13	OWO	TOL	WIN	NSV	46th	57	

^{*} Season still in progress
