= Switch (company) =

American data center company

Switch, Inc.
- Type: Private company
- Industry: Technology
- Founded: 2000
- Headquarters: Las Vegas, Nevada, U.S.
- Key people: Rob Roy (CEO, founder, chairman)
- Revenue: ▲US$511.6 million (2020)
- Owners: DigitalBridge; IFM Investors
- Number of employees: 759 (2020)
- Website: Official website

Switch, Inc. is an American company based in Las Vegas, Nevada, that develops and operates the SUPERNAP data center facilities and provides colocation, telecommunications, cloud services, and content ecosystems.

== History ==
Switch Inc. was established in 2000 by Rob Roy, who is both the CEO and the company's leading inventor and chief engineer. In 2002, Roy acquired a former Enron facility in Nevada through an auction he was the sole attendee of, due to the secretive nature of Enron's fiber plans. This facility, which the company had previously heavily invested in, was purchased for only $930,000. The facility was built in a rundown area of Las Vegas, near E Sahara, constructed right over the "backbone" of fiber optic cables providing service to technology companies nationwide, which Enron sought to use as a way to sell bandwidth to Internet service providers like a commodity. By 2008, Switch planned to construct its first SUPERNAP facility, aiming to outperform competitors like Microsoft and Google with a $350 million investment. Roy claimed this facility could accommodate four times as much equipment as those of the mentioned tech giants.

Switch is a CLEC (Competitive Local Exchange Carrier) that sells all telecommunications services.

As of July 2015, half of the company's 14 top executives are women. Seventy-percent of the current workforce are veterans.

In 2015, the company became the first data center service in the U.S. to participate in President Barack Obama's American Business Act on Climate Pledge. Switch is currently constructing the first of two solar farms, which will provide renewable energy to its data centers. As of January 1, 2016, all Switch data centers are powered exclusively by clean and renewable energy. In 2016 Switch joined the WWF/WRI Renewable Buyers’ Principles.

In its 2017 report on the energy footprint of the IT sector, Greenpeace recognized Switch for the company's use of renewable energy in its data centers. In 2020, construction started on a 555 MW solar project in Nevada, of which 127 MW is behind-the-meter at Citadel.

The company was taken private in December 2022, following an $11 billion acquisition by DigitalBridge and IFM Investors.

== Data centers ==
The Pyramid Campus seen in 2008 as the Steelcase Pyramid

In 2008, the company opened SUPERNAP 7, a 515,047-square-foot (47,849.4 m^{2}) facility, its seventh data center. In 2017, LAS VEGAS 10 opened adding approximately 350,000 sq ft (33,000 m^{2}) of data center space. The Core Campus located in Las Vegas consists of eleven operating data centers spanning over 2 million square feet (190,000 m^{2}). At completion of construction, The Core Campus will measure more than 2.3 million square feet (210,000 m^{2}) with 12 buildings.

Power to the data facilities will be generated through two solar generation projects, Switch Station 1 and Switch Station 2. The Switch Stations will produce 179-megawatts of power and were originally part of a joint construction project through First Solar in partnership with NV Energy. In June 2017, EDF Renewable Energy acquired the two solar projects from First Solar.

Switch has sued NV Energy for $30 million over disagreements about power price, and in 2016 Switch was allowed to switch from NV Energy to its own solar power plants at an "exit fee" of $27 million.

In January, 2015 Switch announced a $4 billion expansion plan to build a new data center campus east of Reno in Storey County. The Citadel Campus at Tahoe Reno Industrial Center (TRIC) is over 1,000 acres (400 ha) and is expected to have more than 7.2 million square feet (670,000 m^{2}) of data center space at completion. In February 2017, Switch opened its first data center on the campus, TAHOE RENO 1, which will be more than 1.3 million square feet (120,000 m^{2}), have 130 MVA power capacity, and more than 83,000 tons of cooling capability, making it the largest data center campus in the world.

Switch's Pyramid Campus (former Steelcase Pyramid) in Grand Rapids, Michigan, was opened in May 2017. At completion, it will reach up to 1.8 million square feet (170,000 m^{2}) making it the largest data center campus in the eastern U.S.

== SUPERNAP International ==
In 2014, Switch formed SUPERNAP International in partnership with ACDC Fund and its two limited partners Orascom TMT Investments and Accelero Capital to build data centers based on designs from the Tier IV-rated Switch SUPERNAP U.S. facilities. The two new SUPERNAP International campus projects under construction are located in Siziano, Italy slated to open late 2016 and the Chonburi Province, Thailand, campus opening in early 2017.

The SUPERNAP data center campus in Siziano, Italy, will be 452,084 sq ft (42,000.0 m^{2}) and have 40-megawatt power distributed via two 132kV transmission paths.

The US$300 million (11 billion THB) Thailand SUPERNAP data center facility will have capacity for more than 6,000 data server racks. It will cover an area of nearly 75 rai (12 hectares) and is located 27-kilometers away from an international cable landing station linking national and international telecoms and IT carriers.

== Locations ==
Switch headquarters are in Las Vegas, with data center facilities and Innovation Centers located in northern and southern Nevada. The firm added a campus in Grand Rapids, Michigan, and recently announced plans to develop a more than 1-million-square-foot (93,000 m^{2}) data center campus in Atlanta.

== Customers ==
Switch has hundreds of clients, including Fortune 1000 companies. According to The Register, "organizations turn to Switch for black-ops projects, spam filtering of the most serious proportions, utility computing projects, data warehouses at casinos, modeling, online games and ordinary e-commerce".

Switch developed an over $5 trillion purchasing cooperative to allow customers to collectively purchase telecommunications and other services across all of its campuses.

== Certifications and awards ==
Switch SUPERNAP 8 data center has received Tier IV Gold Operational Sustainability Certificate from the Uptime Institute, a Tier IV Constructed Facility Certificate and Tier IV Design Certificate. In addition, Switch SUPERNAP 9 has received a Tier IV Gold Operational Sustainability Certificate, a Tier IV Design Certificate and a Tier IV Constructed Facility Certificate.

== Supercomputers ==
In 2014, the firm announced collaboration with Intel and the University of Nevada, Las Vegas to give university researchers access to a powerful supercomputer. iSupercomputer Cherry Creek will be housed on Switch's campus, with researchers accessing the computer through the SUPERNAP facilities' telecommunications network.

In 2017, the firm donated $3.4 million in data center services to the University of Nevada, Reno for a new supercomputer, called Pronghorn. The supercomputer will be housed in the TAHOE RENO 1 data center, and it is expected that the initial hardware installation will be completed in September 2017.

== Collaborative centers ==
The firm has designed a 65,000 sq ft (6,000 m^{2}) center in Las Vegas, Nevada. It partnered with the University of Nevada, Reno to develop the northern Nevada-based center in Reno which opened in September 2015. The centers are intended for collaboration between students, entrepreneurs, businesses, investors and non-profits. They are named "inNEVation Center".

The Reno center is home to the Nevada Advanced Autonomous Systems Innovation Center (NAASIC). Funded by a grant from Governor's Office of Economic Development, it hosts programs to commercialize stationary robotic and advanced manufacturing systems, unmanned aerial vehicles, driverless cars, and underwater robots.
