= 2017 Overton's 150 =

12th race of the 2017 NASCAR Camping World Truck Series

Race details
- Race 12 of 23 of the 2017 NASCAR Camping World Truck Series
- Date: July 29, 2017
- Official name: 8th Annual Overton's 150
- Location: Long Pond, Pennsylvania, Pocono Raceway
- Course: Permanent racing facility
- Course length: 2.5 miles (4.0 km)
- Distance: 60 laps, 150 mi (241.402 km)
- Scheduled distance: 60 laps, 150 mi (241.402 km)
- Average speed: 121.594 miles per hour (195.687 km/h)

Pole position
Driver	Ben Rhodes	ThorSport Racing
- Time: 52.931

Most laps led
Driver	Kyle Busch	Kyle Busch Motorsports
- Laps: 32

Winner
No. 4	Christopher Bell	Kyle Busch Motorsports

Television in the United States
- Network: FOX
- Announcers: Vince Welch, Phil Parsons, Michael Waltrip

Radio in the United States
- Radio: Motor Racing Network

The 2017 Overton's 150 was the 12th stock car race of the 2017 NASCAR Camping World Truck Series and the eighth iteration of the event. The race was held on Saturday, July 29, 2017, in Long Pond, Pennsylvania at Pocono Raceway, a 2.5 miles (4.0 km) triangular permanent course. The race took the scheduled 60 laps to complete. At race's end, Christopher Bell, driving for Kyle Busch Motorsports, would take control of the race after Kyle Busch wrecked midway into the race, stealing the victory. The win was Bell's sixth career NASCAR Camping World Truck Series win and his fourth of the season. To fill out the podium, Ben Rhodes of ThorSport Racing and Ryan Truex of Hattori Racing Enterprises would finish second and third, respectively.

== Background ==
The layout of Pocono Raceway, the venue where the race was held.

The race was held at Pocono Raceway, which is a three-turn superspeedway located in Long Pond, Pennsylvania. The track hosts two annual NASCAR Sprint Cup Series races, as well as one Xfinity Series and Camping World Truck Series event. Until 2019, the track also hosted an IndyCar Series race.

Pocono Raceway is one of a very few NASCAR tracks not owned by either Speedway Motorsports, Inc. or International Speedway Corporation. It is operated by the Igdalsky siblings Brandon, Nicholas, and sister Ashley, and cousins Joseph IV and Chase Mattioli, all of whom are third-generation members of the family-owned Mattco Inc, started by Joseph II and Rose Mattioli.

Outside of the NASCAR races, the track is used throughout the year by Sports Car Club of America (SCCA) and motorcycle clubs as well as racing schools and an IndyCar race. The triangular oval also has three separate infield sections of racetrack – North Course, East Course and South Course. Each of these infield sections use a separate portion of the tri-oval to complete the track. During regular non-race weekends, multiple clubs can use the track by running on different infield sections. Also some of the infield sections can be run in either direction, or multiple infield sections can be put together – such as running the North Course and the South Course and using the tri-oval to connect the two.

=== Entry list ===
- (R) denotes rookie driver.
- (i) denotes driver who is ineligible for series driver points.

#	Driver	Team	Make	Sponsor
0	Matt Mills	Jennifer Jo Cobb Racing	Chevrolet	Driven 2 Honor
1	Jordan Anderson	TJL Motorsports	Chevrolet	Jacob Companies
02	Austin Hill	Young's Motorsports	Ford	Whitetail Heaven Outfitters
4	Christopher Bell	Kyle Busch Motorsports	Toyota	SiriusXM
6	Norm Benning	Norm Benning Racing	Chevrolet	Norm Benning Racing
8	John Hunter Nemechek	NEMCO Motorsports	Chevrolet	Fire Alarm Services
10	Jennifer Jo Cobb	Jennifer Jo Cobb Racing	Chevrolet	Driven 2 Honor
13	Cody Coughlin (R)	ThorSport Racing	Toyota	JEGS
16	Ryan Truex	Hattori Racing Enterprises	Toyota	ShopRite
18	Noah Gragson (R)	Kyle Busch Motorsports	Toyota	Switch
19	Austin Cindric (R)	Brad Keselowski Racing	Ford	LTi Printing
21	Johnny Sauter	GMS Racing	Chevrolet	Allegiant Air
24	Justin Haley (R)	GMS Racing	Chevrolet	Fraternal Order of Eagles
27	Ben Rhodes	ThorSport Racing	Toyota	Safelite Auto Glass
28	Bryan Dauzat	FDNY Racing	Chevrolet	FDNY
29	Chase Briscoe (R)	Brad Keselowski Racing	Ford	Cooper-Standard
33	Kaz Grala (R)	GMS Racing	Chevrolet	Kiklos
36	Camden Murphy	MB Motorsports	Chevrolet	Fr8Auctions
44	Austin Wayne Self	Martins Motorsports	Chevrolet	AM Technical Solutions, Don't Mess with Texas
45	T. J. Bell	Niece Motorsports	Chevrolet	Valvoline, '47
49	Wendell Chavous (R)	Premium Motorsports	Chevrolet	ZyGenX
51	Kyle Busch (i)	Kyle Busch Motorsports	Toyota	Textron, Beechcraft
52	Stewart Friesen (R)	Halmar Friesen Racing	Chevrolet	Halmar
57	Mike Senica	Norm Benning Racing	Chevrolet	Norm Benning Racing
63	Travis Kvapil	MB Motorsports	Chevrolet	MB Motorsports
66	Justin Fontaine	Bolen Motorsports	Toyota	ProMatic Automation
83	Todd Peck	Copp Motorsports	Chevrolet	Pulse Transport
87	Joe Nemechek	NEMCO Motorsports	Chevrolet	D. A. B. Constructors, Inc.
88	Matt Crafton	ThorSport Racing	Toyota	Menards, Goof Off
98	Grant Enfinger (R)	ThorSport Racing	Toyota	JIVE Communications
Official entry list

== Practice ==
=== First practice ===
The first practice session was held on Friday, July 28, at 12:00 PM EST, and would last for 55 minutes. Justin Haley of GMS Racing would set the fastest time in the session, with a lap of 53.056 and an average speed of 169.632 miles per hour (272.996 km/h).

Pos.	#	Driver	Team	Make	Time	Speed
1	24	Justin Haley (R)	GMS Racing	Chevrolet	53.056	169.632
2	51	Kyle Busch (i)	Kyle Busch Motorsports	Toyota	53.240	169.046
3	33	Kaz Grala (R)	GMS Racing	Chevrolet	53.277	168.928
Full first practice results

=== Second and final practice ===
The second and final practice session, sometimes referred to as Happy Hour, was held on Friday, July 28, at 2:00 PM EST, and would last for 55 minutes. Christopher Bell of Kyle Busch Motorsports would set the fastest time in the session, with a lap of 53.366 and an average speed of 168.647 miles per hour (271.411 km/h).

Pos.	#	Driver	Team	Make	Time	Speed
1	4	Christopher Bell	Kyle Busch Motorsports	Toyota	53.366	168.647
2	51	Kyle Busch (i)	Kyle Busch Motorsports	Toyota	53.417	168.486
3	21	Johnny Sauter	GMS Racing	Chevrolet	53.483	168.278
Full Happy Hour practice results

== Qualifying ==
Qualifying was held on Saturday, July 29, at 10:00 AM EST. Since Pocono Raceway is at least a 1.5 miles (2.4 km) racetrack, the qualifying system was a single car, single lap, two round system where in the first round, everyone would set a time to determine positions 13–32. Then, the fastest 12 qualifiers would move on to the second round to determine positions 1–12.

Ben Rhodes of ThorSport Racing would win the pole, setting a lap of 52.931 and an average speed of 170.033 miles per hour (273.642 km/h) in the second round.

No drivers would fail to qualify.

=== Full qualifying results ===
Pos.	#	Driver	Team	Make	Time (R1)	Speed (R1)	Time (R2)	Speed (R2)
1	27	Ben Rhodes	ThorSport Racing	Toyota	52.970	169.907	52.931	170.033
2	51	Kyle Busch (i)	Kyle Busch Motorsports	Toyota	53.238	169.052	52.942	169.997
3	4	Christopher Bell	Kyle Busch Motorsports	Toyota	52.987	169.853	52.971	169.904
4	16	Ryan Truex	Hattori Racing Enterprises	Toyota	53.648	167.760	53.147	169.342
5	29	Chase Briscoe (R)	Brad Keselowski Racing	Ford	53.341	168.726	53.531	168.127
6	8	John Hunter Nemechek	NEMCO Motorsports	Chevrolet	53.253	169.005	53.610	167.879
7	21	Johnny Sauter	GMS Racing	Chevrolet	53.760	167.411	53.621	167.845
8	18	Noah Gragson (R)	Kyle Busch Motorsports	Toyota	53.506	168.205	53.668	167.698
9	88	Matt Crafton	ThorSport Racing	Toyota	53.640	167.785	53.936	166.864
10	02	Austin Hill	Young's Motorsports	Ford	54.216	166.003	54.421	165.377
11	33	Kaz Grala (R)	GMS Racing	Chevrolet	54.136	166.248	54.503	165.129
12	98	Grant Enfinger (R)	ThorSport Racing	Toyota	54.247	165.908	54.505	165.122
Eliminated in Round 1
13	13	Cody Coughlin (R)	ThorSport Racing	Toyota	54.501	165.135	-	-
14	24	Justin Haley (R)	GMS Racing	Chevrolet	54.546	164.998	-	-
15	52	Stewart Friesen (R)	Halmar Friesen Racing	Chevrolet	54.830	164.144	-	-
16	45	T. J. Bell	Niece Motorsports	Chevrolet	55.100	163.339	-	-
17	19	Austin Cindric (R)	Brad Keselowski Racing	Ford	55.390	162.484	-	-
18	1	Jordan Anderson	TJL Motorsports	Chevrolet	56.071	160.511	-	-
19	0	Matt Mills	Jennifer Jo Cobb Racing	Chevrolet	56.653	158.862	-	-
20	83	Todd Peck	Copp Motorsports	Chevrolet	56.775	158.520	-	-
21	44	Austin Wayne Self	Martins Motorsports	Chevrolet	57.188	157.376	-	-
22	49	Wendell Chavous (R)	Premium Motorsports	Chevrolet	57.374	156.865	-	-
23	36	Camden Murphy	MB Motorsports	Chevrolet	57.646	156.125	-	-
24	6	Norm Benning	Norm Benning Racing	Chevrolet	58.053	155.031	-	-
25	63	Travis Kvapil	MB Motorsports	Chevrolet	58.442	153.999	-	-
26	87	Joe Nemechek	NEMCO Motorsports	Chevrolet	58.627	153.513	-	-
27	28	Bryan Dauzat	FDNY Racing	Chevrolet	1:01.499	146.344	-	-
28	10	Jennifer Jo Cobb	Jennifer Jo Cobb Racing	Chevrolet	1:01.543	146.239	-	-
29	57	Mike Senica	Norm Benning Racing	Chevrolet	1:06.570	135.196	-	-
30	66	Justin Fontaine	Bolen Motorsports	Toyota	-	-	-	-
Official qualifying results
Official starting lineup

== Race results ==
Stage 1 Laps: 15

Pos.	#	Driver	Team	Make	Pts
1	51	Kyle Busch (i)	Kyle Busch Motorsports	Toyota	0
2	4	Christopher Bell	Kyle Busch Motorsports	Toyota	9
3	27	Ben Rhodes	ThorSport Racing	Toyota	8
4	16	Ryan Truex	Hattori Racing Enterprises	Toyota	7
5	88	Matt Crafton	ThorSport Racing	Toyota	6
6	29	Chase Briscoe (R)	Brad Keselowski Racing	Ford	5
7	8	John Hunter Nemechek	NEMCO Motorsports	Chevrolet	4
8	18	Noah Gragson (R)	Kyle Busch Motorsports	Toyota	3
9	98	Grant Enfinger (R)	ThorSport Racing	Toyota	2
10	33	Kaz Grala (R)	GMS Racing	Chevrolet	1

Stage 2 Laps: 15

Pos.	#	Driver	Team	Make	Pts
1	51	Kyle Busch (i)	Kyle Busch Motorsports	Toyota	0
2	16	Ryan Truex	Hattori Racing Enterprises	Toyota	9
3	4	Christopher Bell	Kyle Busch Motorsports	Toyota	8
4	27	Ben Rhodes	ThorSport Racing	Toyota	7
5	29	Chase Briscoe (R)	Brad Keselowski Racing	Ford	6
6	8	John Hunter Nemechek	NEMCO Motorsports	Chevrolet	5
7	33	Kaz Grala (R)	GMS Racing	Chevrolet	4
8	52	Stewart Friesen (R)	Halmar Friesen Racing	Chevrolet	3
9	19	Austin Cindric (R)	Brad Keselowski Racing	Ford	2
10	45	T. J. Bell	Niece Motorsports	Chevrolet	1

Stage 3 Laps: 30

Fin	St	#	Driver	Team	Make	Laps	Led	Status	Pts
1	3	4	Christopher Bell	Kyle Busch Motorsports	Toyota	60	7	running	57
2	1	27	Ben Rhodes	ThorSport Racing	Toyota	60	0	running	50
3	4	16	Ryan Truex	Hattori Racing Enterprises	Toyota	60	0	running	50
4	6	8	John Hunter Nemechek	NEMCO Motorsports	Chevrolet	60	9	running	42
5	7	21	Johnny Sauter	GMS Racing	Chevrolet	60	12	running	32
6	9	88	Matt Crafton	ThorSport Racing	Toyota	60	0	running	37
7	17	19	Austin Cindric (R)	Brad Keselowski Racing	Ford	60	0	running	32
8	13	13	Cody Coughlin (R)	ThorSport Racing	Toyota	60	0	running	29
9	5	29	Chase Briscoe (R)	Brad Keselowski Racing	Ford	60	0	running	39
10	14	24	Justin Haley (R)	GMS Racing	Chevrolet	60	0	running	27
11	10	02	Austin Hill	Young's Motorsports	Ford	60	0	running	26
12	15	52	Stewart Friesen (R)	Halmar Friesen Racing	Chevrolet	60	0	running	28
13	12	98	Grant Enfinger (R)	ThorSport Racing	Toyota	60	0	running	26
14	16	45	T. J. Bell	Niece Motorsports	Chevrolet	60	0	running	24
15	30	66	Justin Fontaine	Bolen Motorsports	Toyota	60	0	running	22
16	21	44	Austin Wayne Self	Martins Motorsports	Chevrolet	60	0	running	21
17	18	1	Jordan Anderson	TJL Motorsports	Chevrolet	60	0	running	20
18	28	10	Jennifer Jo Cobb	Jennifer Jo Cobb Racing	Chevrolet	60	0	running	19
19	20	83	Todd Peck	Copp Motorsports	Chevrolet	60	0	running	18
20	22	49	Wendell Chavous (R)	Premium Motorsports	Chevrolet	59	0	running	17
21	24	6	Norm Benning	Norm Benning Racing	Chevrolet	59	0	running	16
22	27	28	Bryan Dauzat	FDNY Racing	Chevrolet	56	0	running	15
23	11	33	Kaz Grala (R)	GMS Racing	Chevrolet	42	0	crash	19
24	8	18	Noah Gragson (R)	Kyle Busch Motorsports	Toyota	39	0	crash	16
25	2	51	Kyle Busch (i)	Kyle Busch Motorsports	Toyota	36	32	crash	0
26	25	63	Travis Kvapil	MB Motorsports	Chevrolet	23	0	vibration	11
27	19	0	Matt Mills	Jennifer Jo Cobb Racing	Chevrolet	6	0	rear gear	10
28	23	36	Camden Murphy	MB Motorsports	Chevrolet	4	0	electrical	9
29	26	87	Joe Nemechek	NEMCO Motorsports	Chevrolet	3	0	vibration	8
30	29	57	Mike Senica	Norm Benning Racing	Chevrolet	2	0	steering	7
Official race results

== Standings after the race ==
Drivers' Championship standings

Pos	Driver	Points
1	Christopher Bell	528
2	Johnny Sauter	510 (-18)
3	Chase Briscoe	470 (–58)
4	Matt Crafton	464 (–64)
5	John Hunter Nemechek	396 (–132)
6	Ben Rhodes	387 (–141)
7	Ryan Truex	386 (–142)
8	Grant Enfinger	382 (–146)
Official driver's standings

- Note: Only the first 8 positions are included for the driver standings.

Previous race: 2017 Eldora Dirt Derby	NASCAR Camping World Truck Series; 2017 season	Next race: 2017 LTi Printing 200
