= Brad Keselowski Racing =

Defunct stock car racing team

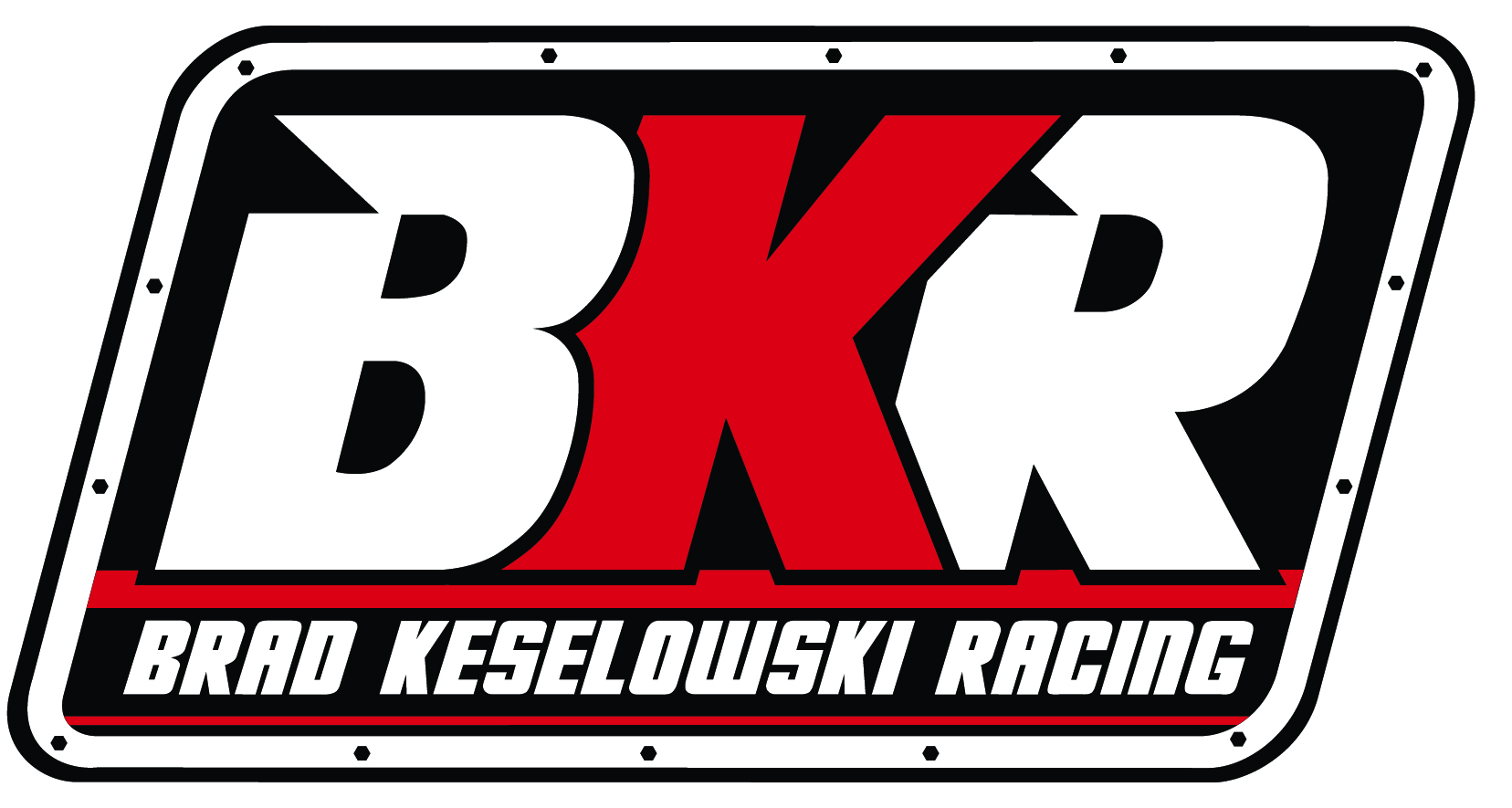
- Owner: Brad Keselowski
- Base: Statesville, North Carolina
- Series: Craftsman Truck Series
- Race drivers: Austin Cindric; Chase Briscoe
- Manufacturer: Chevrolet (2008–2009); Dodge (2010–2011); Ram (2012); Ford (2013–2017)
- Opened: 2007
- Closed: 2017

Career
- Debut: 2008 Toyota Tundra 200 (Nashville)
- Latest race: 2017 Ford EcoBoost 200 (Homestead)
- Races competed: 305
- Drivers' Championships: 0
- Race victories: 11
- Pole positions: 18

Brad Keselowski Racing was an American professional stock car racing team that competed in the NASCAR Camping World Truck Series. Started in 2007, it was owned and operated by NASCAR Cup Series and Xfinity Series champion Brad Keselowski. The team most recently fielded the Nos. 19 and 29 Ford F-150s for Austin Cindric and Chase Briscoe. On August 17, 2017, BKR announced that they would suspend operations after the conclusion of the 2017 season.

== Camping World Truck Series ==
=== Truck No. 2 history ===
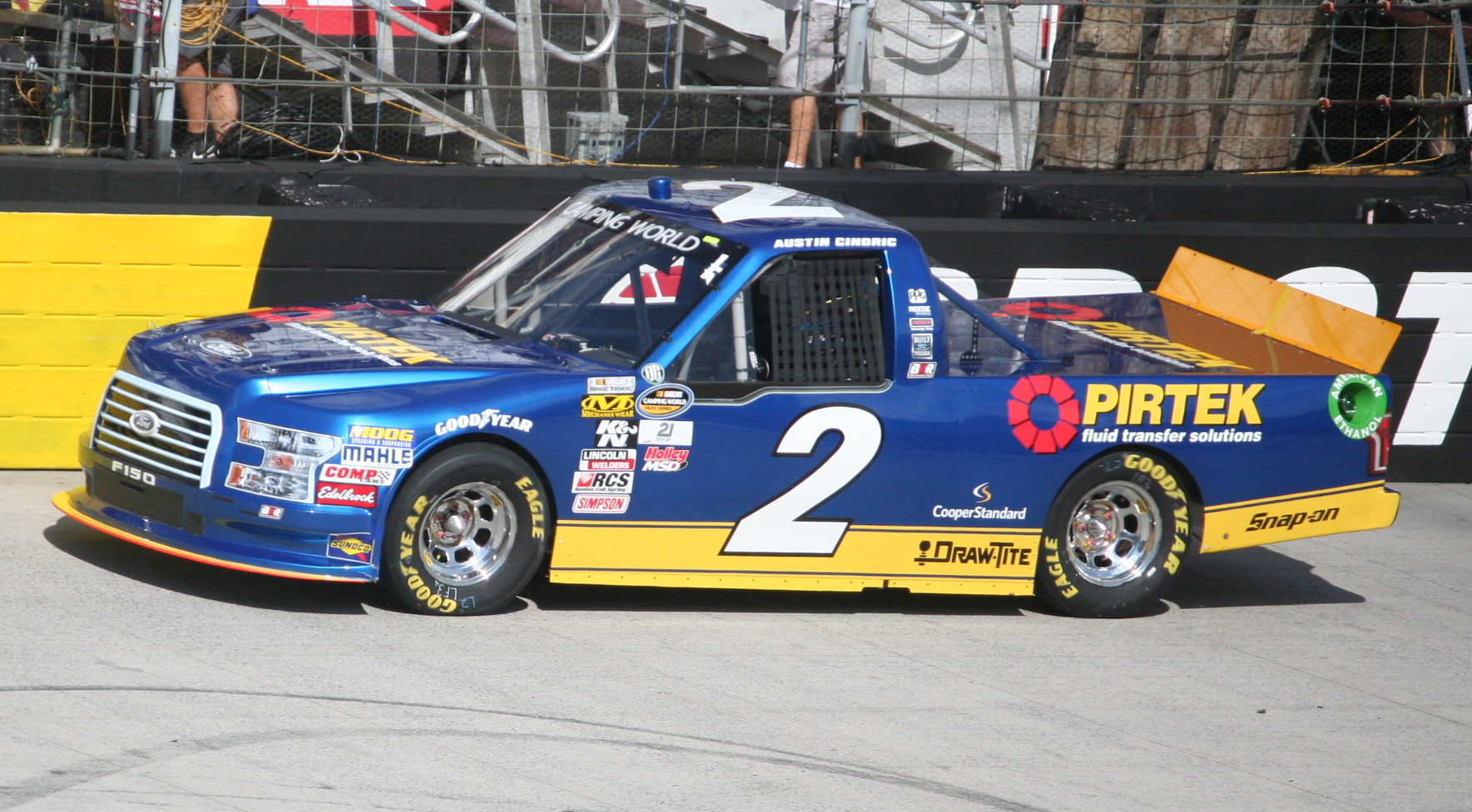
Austin Cindric in the No. 2 at Bristol Motor Speedway in 2016

Part Time (2013, 2016)

Brad Keselowski Racing first fielded a third truck, the No. 2, driven by Brad Keselowski on May 17, 2013 at Charlotte Motor Speedway.

On February 8, 2016, it was announced that BKR would field a third truck entry with Austin Theriault driving the No. 2 Ford F-150 at Daytona. It previously ran in 2013 with Keselowski at Charlotte. On April 28, it was later announced that Austin Cindric and Austin Theriault would run additional races in the No. 2. Theriault and Cindric didn't qualify for their races at Charlotte Motor Speedway and Dover International Speedway due to owner point standings when rain caused NASCAR to cancel qualifying. However, Cindric made four starts later in the season at Bristol Motor Speedway, Canadian Tire Motorsport Park, Talladega Superspeedway and Phoenix International Raceway with sponsorship from Pirtek.

==== Truck No. 2 results ====
Year	Driver	No.	Make	1	2	3	4	5	6	7	8	9	10	11	12	13	14	15	16	17	18	19	20	21	22	23	Owners	Pts
2013	Brad Keselowski	2	Ford	DAY	MAR	CAR	KAN	CLT; 14	DOV	TEX	KEN	IOW	ELD	POC	MCH	BRI	MSP	IOW	CHI	LVS	TAL	MAR	TEX	PHO	HOM		54th	30
2016	Austin Theriault	2	Ford	DAY; 27*	ATL	MAR	KAN		CLT; DNQ	TEX	IOW	GTW	KEN	ELD	POC												36th	64
2016	Austin Cindric	2	Ford					DOV; DNQ								BRI; 18	MCH	MSP; 23	CHI	NHA	LVS	TAL; 20	MAR	TEX	PHO; 15	HOM	36th	64

=== Truck No. 19 history ===
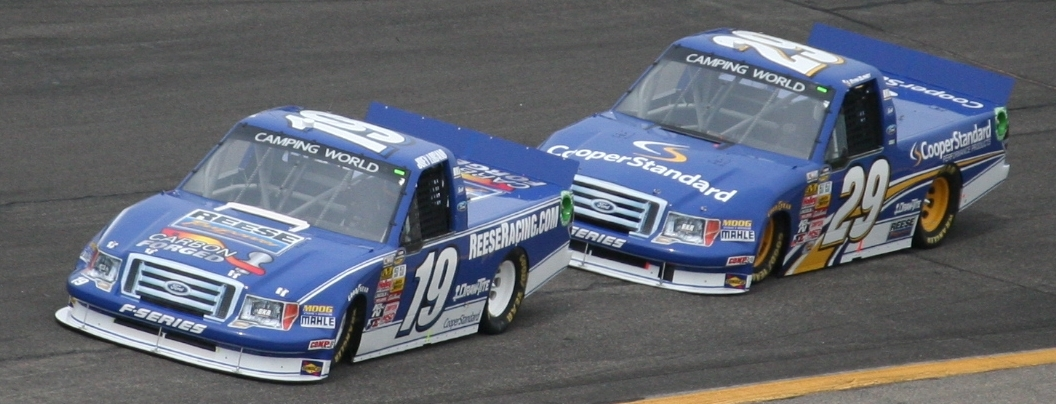
Joey Logano (19) and Ryan Blaney (29) race for BKR at Rockingham in 2013

Part Time (2008, 2012)

2008 saw BKR expand its operation to include participation in the NASCAR Camping World Truck Series. Robb Brent signed on to drive the No. 19 Chevrolet for three races, with a best finish of 21st. Keselowski drove the No. 19 Chevrolet himself in the Lucas Oil 150 at the Phoenix International Raceway. Using the engine out of his race-winning Nationwide Series car from Bristol Motor Speedway, he started seventh and finished the race in the sixth position.

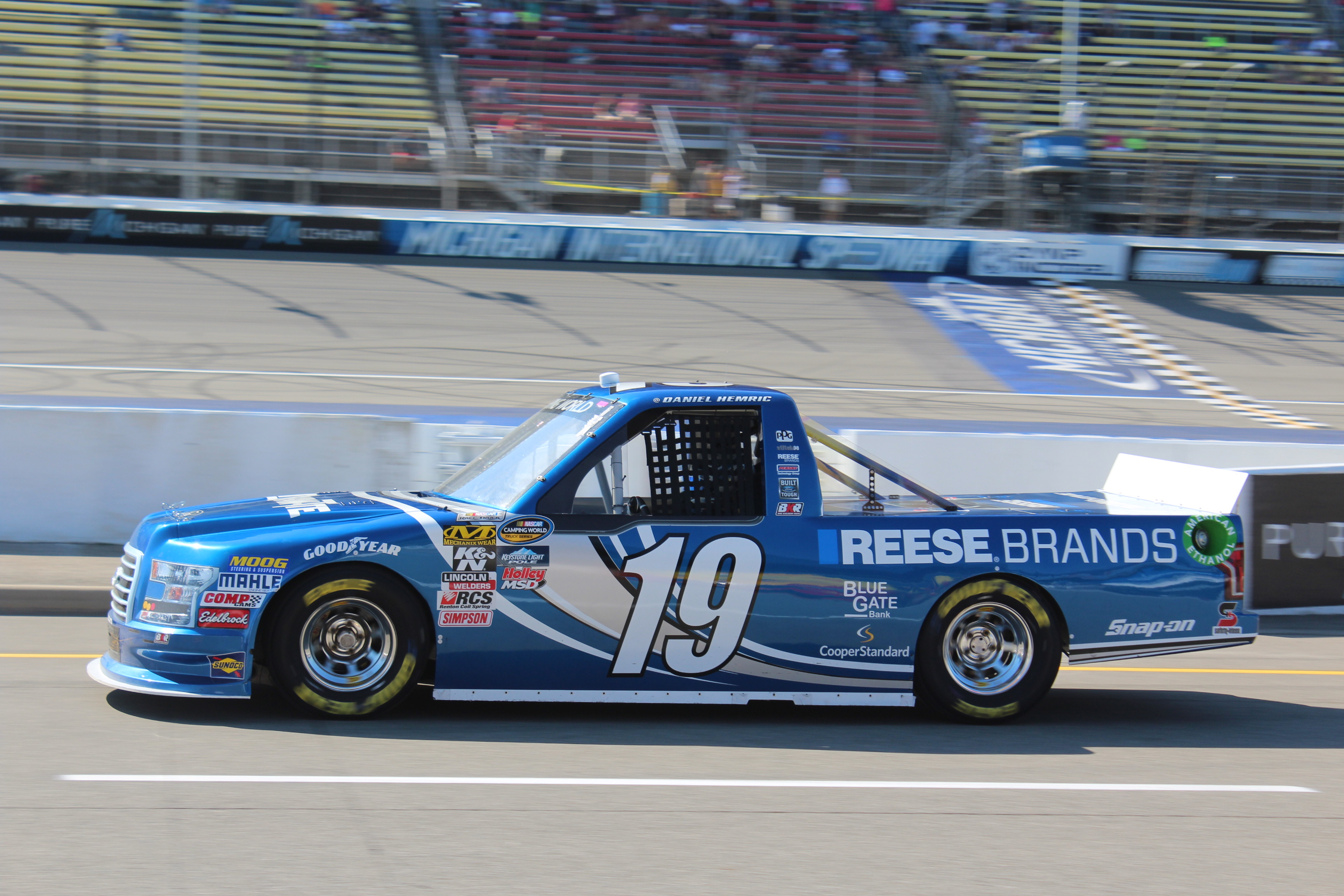
Daniel Hemric's No. 19 Reese Brands F-150 during practice for the 2016 Careers for Veterans 200 at Michigan International Speedway.

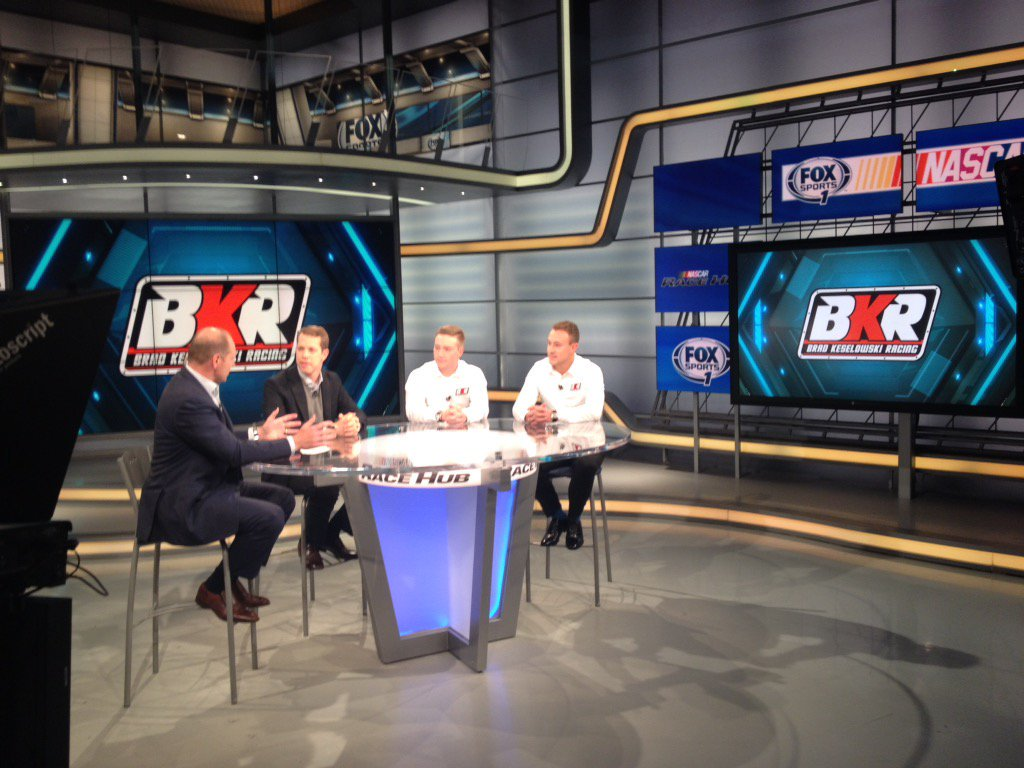
Brad Keselowski, Daniel Hemric and Tyler Reddick announce BKR's 2016 lineup on NASCAR Race Hub

In 2012, team owner Keselowski also drove a second truck, the No. 19, for four races. Ryan Blaney drove it for one race, and David Mayhew for four races.

Multiple Drivers (2013–2014)

2013 was the first full-time season for BKR's No. 19 truck, the races shared by Ross Chastain (14), Keselowski (4), Joey Logano (3), and Ryan Blaney (1). In 2014, the No. 19 truck got its first ever win, by Keselowski, who won his only Truck Series victory, at Bristol. Tyler Reddick ran 16 of the races in the No. 19, scoring 9 top tens, Joey Logano ran 2 races and Alex Tagliani ran the road course to fill out the full schedule.

Tyler Reddick (2015)

In 2015, the No. 19 was driven full-time by Tyler Reddick, with Reddick winning two races (Daytona International Speedway, Dover International Speedway) before ultimately finishing second in the standings.

Daniel Hemric (2016)

In 2016, Daniel Hemric joined the team, driving the No. 19 California Clean Power/Draw-Tite Ford. Hemric qualified for the inaugural NCWTS Chase and ended the season sixth in the driver point standings. Hemric departed to XFINITY Series competition at Richard Childress Racing in 2017.

Austin Cindric (2017)

Austin Cindric was named as full-time driver for the No. 19 Draw-Tite Ford F-150 in 2017 and ran for Rookie of the Year honors. Two weeks after the team announced its upcoming closure at the end of the season, Cindric won his first NCWTS race in the Chevrolet Silverado 250 at Canadian Tire Motorsports Park in his 22nd start in the series.

==== Truck No. 19 results ====
Year	Driver	No.	Make	1	2	3	4	5	6	7	8	9	10	11	12	13	14	15	16	17	18	19	20	21	22	23	24	25	Owners	Pts
2008	Robb Brent	19	Chevy	DAY	CAL	ATL	MAR	KAN	CLT	MFD	DOV	TEX	MCH	MLW	MEM	KEN	IRP	NSH; 21	BRI	GTW; 32	NHA	LVS; 24	TAL	MAR	ATL	TEX			37th	408
2008	Brad Keselowski	19	Chevy																								PHO; 6	HOM	37th	408
2012	Brad Keselowski	19	Ram	DAY; 27	MAR	CAR	KAN; 3	CLT; 2	DOV	TEX	KEN; 2	IOW	CHI	POC	MCH														30th	280
2012	Ryan Blaney	19	Ram													BRI; 6	ATL												30th	280
2012	David Mayhew	19	Ram															IOW; 16	KEN; 26	LVS	TAL	MAR	TEX; 24	PHO; 12	HOM				30th	280
2013	Ross Chastain	19	Ford	DAY; 14	MAR; 20			CLT; 9	DOV; 16	TEX; 13		IOW; 13		POC; 5			MSP; 7	IOW; 2*		LVS; 14	TAL; 3	MAR; 14		PHO; 2	HOM; 8				4th	764
2013	Joey Logano	19	Ford			CAR; 2	KAN; 24								MCH; 4														4th	764
2013	Brad Keselowski	19	Ford								KEN; 2					BRI; 9			CHI; 2				TEX; 21						4th	764
2013	Dave Blaney	19	Ford										ELD; 9																4th	764
2014	Tyler Reddick	19	Ford	DAY; 12	MAR; 16			DOV; 8	TEX; 21	GTW; 13		IOW; 9	ELD; 11	POC; 23				CHI; 4	NHA; 8	LVS; 15	TAL; 4	MAR; 6	TEX; 4	PHO; 10	HOM; 6				6th	755
2014	Joey Logano	19	Ford			KAN; 3									MCH; 18														6th	755
2014	Brad Keselowski	19	Ford				CLT; 3				KEN; 5					BRI; 1*													6th	755
2014	Alex Tagliani	19	Ford														MSP; 16												6th	755
2015	Tyler Reddick	19	Ford	DAY; 1*	ATL; 5	MAR; 5	KAN; 13	CLT; 4	DOV; 1	TEX; 11	GTW; 8	IOW; 3	KEN; 6	ELD; 3	POC; 3	MCH; 9	BRI; 8	MSP; 19	CHI; 2	NHA; 15	LVS; 7	TAL; 5	MAR; 5	TEX; 5	PHO; 5	HOM; 3			2nd	884
2016	Daniel Hemric	19	Ford	DAY; 8	ATL; 4	MAR; 22	KAN; 3	DOV; 9	CLT; 9	TEX; 10	IOW; 15	GTW; 3	KEN; 3	ELD; 8	POC; 22	BRI; 3	MCH; 3	MSP; 3	CHI; 2	NHA; 28	LVS; 2	TAL; 11	MAR; 9	TEX; 3	PHO; 13	HOM; 5			5th	2163
2017	Austin Cindric	19	Ford	DAY; 27	ATL; 21	MAR; 21	KAN; 10	CLT; 13	DOV; 5	TEX; 25	GTW; 11	IOW; 8	KEN; 4	ELD; 10	POC; 7	MCH; 5	BRI; 9	MSP; 1*	CHI; 15	NHA; 8	LVS; 4	TAL; 5	MAR; 10	TEX; 2*	PHO; 9	HOM; 5			5th	2278

=== Truck No. 29 history ===
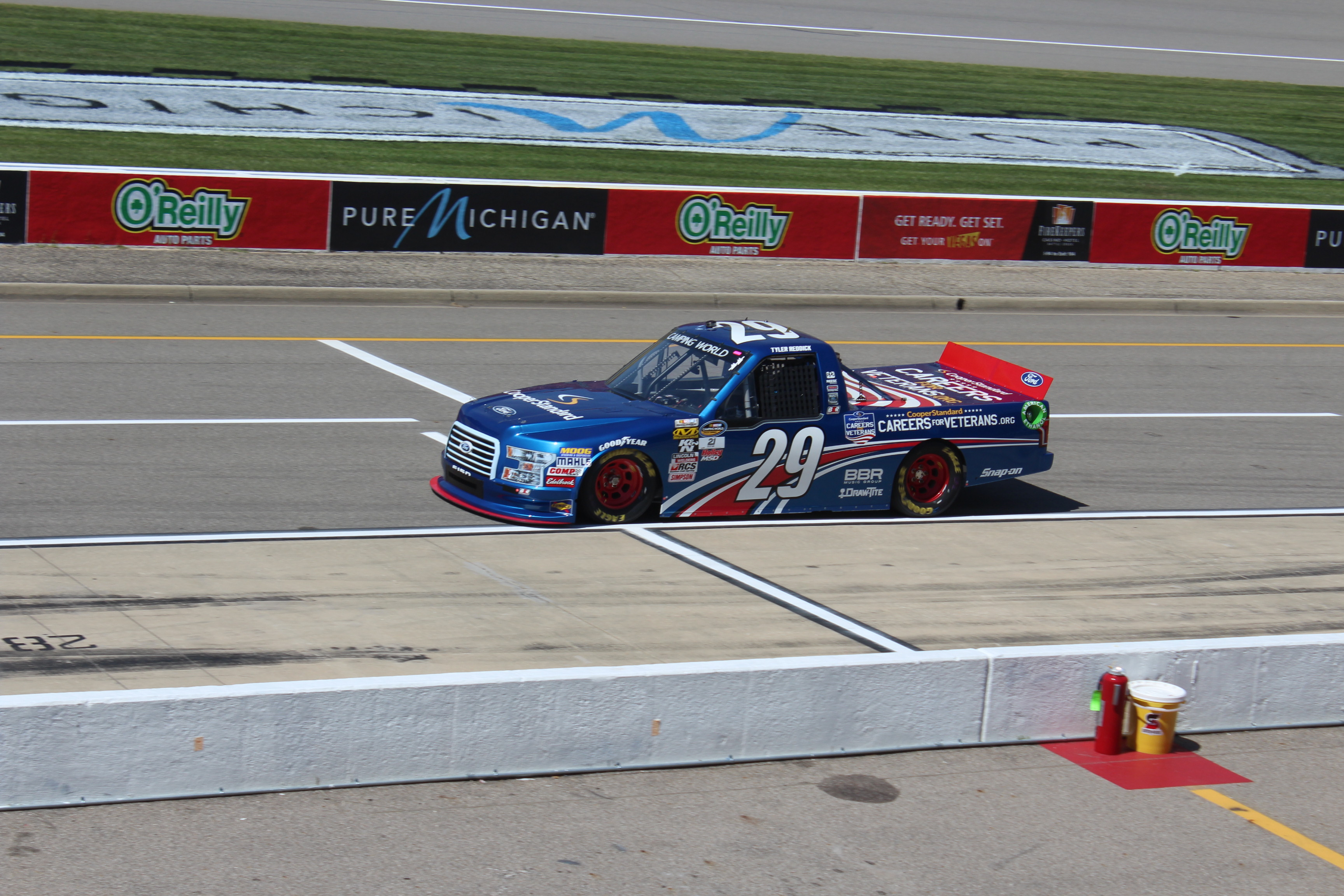
Tyler Reddick's No. 29 F-150, sporting a special paint scheme for the 2016 Careers for Veterans 200 at Michigan International Speedway.

Part Time (2009–2010)

Keselowski entered the team in eight NCWTS races in 2009, driving the Keselowski family's familiar No. 29. BKR brought Mikey Kile in for six races, J. R. Fitzpatrick in for one race, and Keselowski made one start at Bristol. The team earned its best finish of 10th at Las Vegas Motor Speedway, and its best finish of 11th (Milwaukee, Gateway), all with Kile behind the wheel. In 2010, the team competed in five NCWTS events, with Keselowski scoring a season-best finish of second at Gateway Motorsports Park.

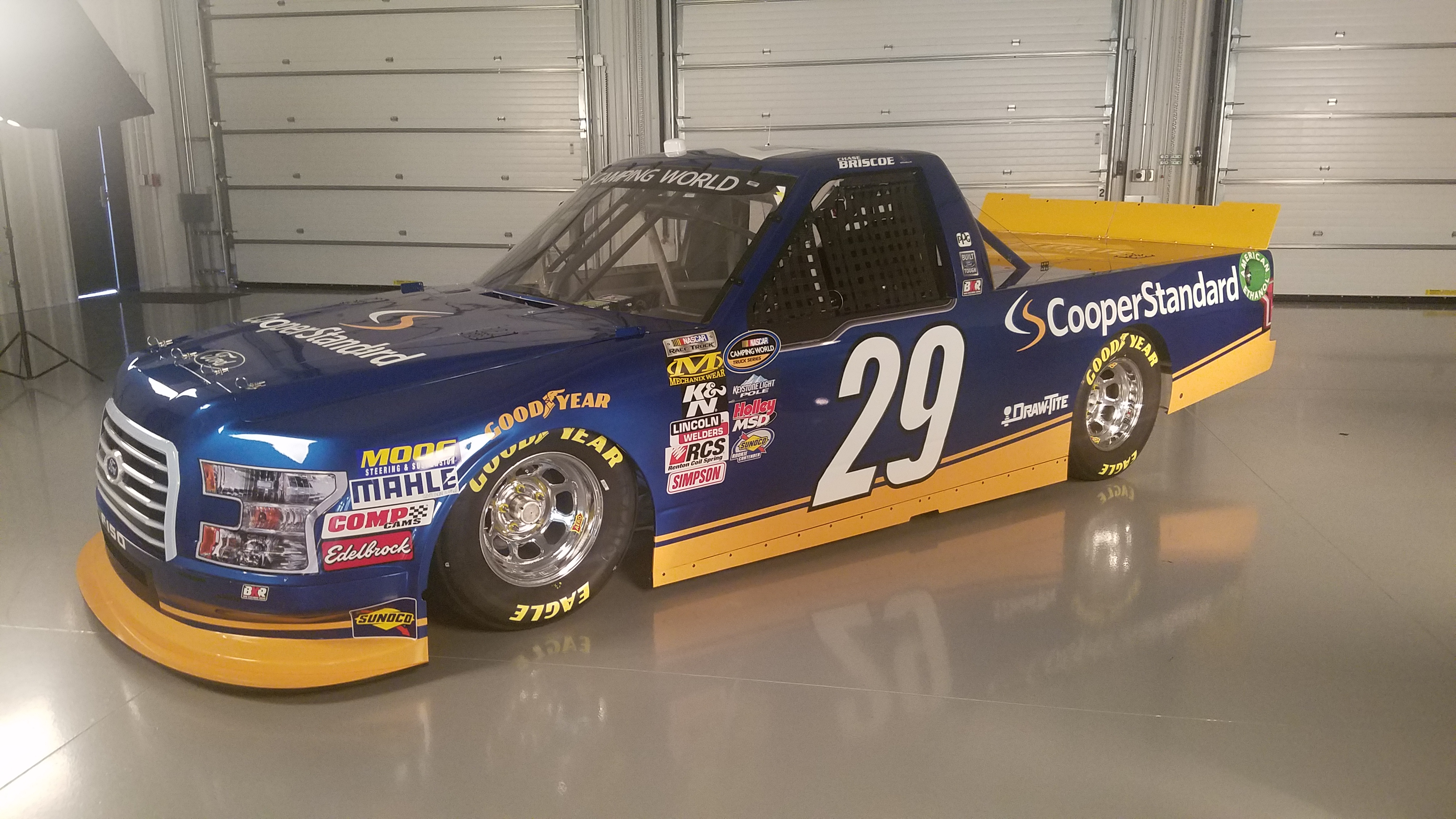
Chase Briscoe's 2017 Cooper Standard Ford F-150 in the Brad Keselowski Racing hauler bay.

Parker Kligerman (2011)

In 2011, BKR fielded the No. 29 Ram for development driver Parker Kligerman. The team intended to run 15 races before Team Penske committed to sponsoring the team for the full season. Kligerman scored a few top fives but finished 11th in points.

Parker Kligerman & Ryan Blaney (2012)

In 2012, Cequent Group and Cooper Standard sponsored the No. 29 team. Due to a lack of performance, Kligerman was released from the No. 29 and Ryan Blaney was brought in to fill out the remaining schedule. Blaney immediately made a splash, winning at Iowa Speedway in his third start, earning the team its first victory.

Ryan Blaney (2013–2014)

Blaney returned to the No. 29 Ford F-150 full-time in 2013, capturing the pole at Kentucky Speedway and the win at Pocono Raceway. In 2014 Blaney captured a win at Canadian Tire Motorsport Park in his full-time effort behind the wheel of the No. 29. Blaney finished second in the championship standings at the end of 2014.

Multiple Drivers (2015)

In 2015 the No. 29 was split between various drivers throughout the season. Cup Series driver Joey Logano earned his first-career Truck Series win at the spring race at Martinsville Speedway, and Ryan Blaney earned the team its second-consecutive win at Bristol Motor Speedway. Austin Theriault drove the truck for several races until his injury at Las Vegas Motor Speedway. In his place, Brad's brother Brian Keselowski drove the truck at Talladega Superspeedway, and rookie Austin Cindric drove the truck for two races before Theriault's return in the season finale at Homestead-Miami Speedway. 2015 also saw BKR relocate from Mooresville, NC to its new facility in Statesville, NC.

Tyler Reddick (2016)

Tyler Reddick switched to the No. 29 for 2016. Despite missing the inaugural Truck Series Championship Chase, Tyler Reddick won the DC Solar 350 at Las Vegas Speedway, leading the team to its first ever 1-2 finish in the NCWTS in what would be his last win for Brad Keselowski Racing. Reddick announced at Homestead-Miami Speedway that he would not be returning to BKR in 2017 to run for Chip Ganassi Racing in the XFINITY Series.

Chase Briscoe (2017)

In 2017, Chase Briscoe was named as the full-time driver of the No. 29 Cooper Standard Ford F-150 to compete for Rookie of the Year honors, in addition to being named as the first driver in the Ford Performance Driver Development Program. Briscoe earned his first-career NCWTS pole at Dover International Speedway. He also won his first race at Homestead-Miami Speedway in the final race of the season and for BKR.

==== Truck No. 29 results ====
Year	Driver	No.	Make	1	2	3	4	5	6	7	8	9	10	11	12	13	14	15	16	17	18	19	20	21	22	23	24	25	Owners	Pts
2009	Mikey Kile	29	Chevy	DAY	CAL	ATL	MAR; 12	KAN	CLT	DOV	TEX	MCH	MLW; 11	MEM	KEN	IRP	NSH		CHI; 27	IOW	GTW; 11	NHA	LVS; 21	MAR		TEX; 16	PHO	HOM	32nd	872
2009	Brad Keselowski	29	Chevy															BRI; 30											32nd	872
2009	J. R. Fitzpatrick	29	Chevy																						TAL; 16				32nd	872
2010	Brad Keselowski	29	Ram	DAY	ATL	MAR	NSH; 18	KAN	DOV	CLT; 28	TEX	MCH	IOW	GTY; 2	IRP	POC	NSH	DAR	BRI; 7	CHI	KEN	NHA	LVS	MAR	TAL				38th	642
2010	Parker Kligerman	29	Ram																							TEX; 9	PHO	HOM	38th	642
2011	Parker Kligerman	29	Ram	DAY; 15	PHO; 32	DAR; 14	MAR; 13	NSH; 10	DOV; 21	CLT; 8	KAN; 11	TEX; 2	KEN; 2	IOW; 22	NSH; 5	IRP; 11	POC; 13	MCH; 23	BRI; 10	ATL; 12	CHI; 4	NHA; 18	KEN; 29	LVS; 10	TAL; 28	MAR; 21	TEX; 28	HOM; 14	13th	728
2012	Parker Kligerman	29	Ram	DAY; 11	MAR; 11	CAR; 9	KAN; 8	CLT; 11	DOV; 2	TEX; 10	KEN; 19	IOW; 10	CHI; 5	POC; 7															8th	730
2012	Brad Keselowski	29	Ram												MCH; 8	BRI; 25													8th	730
2012	Ryan Blaney	29	Ram														ATL; 11	IOW; 1	KEN; 11		TAL; 6	MAR; 8	TEX; 30	PHO; 5	HOM; 28				8th	730
2012	Grant Enfinger	29	Ram																	LVS; 12									8th	730
2013	Ryan Blaney	29	Ford	DAY; 8	MAR; 16	CAR; 8	KAN; 3	CLT; 25	DOV; 3	TEX; 8	KEN; 5	IOW; 26	ELD; 15	POC; 1*	MCH; 32	BRI; 3	MSP; 16	IOW; 10	CHI; 3	LVS; 20	TAL; 21	MAR; 5	TEX; 15	PHO; 7	HOM; 2*				8th	726
2014	Ryan Blaney	29	Ford	DAY; 6	MAR; 4	KAN; 22	CLT; 22	DOV; 2	TEX; 4	GTW; 7	KEN; 3	IOW; 2	ELD; 3	POC; 5	MCH; 21	BRI; 13	MSP; 1*	CHI; 12	NHA; 10	LVS; 6	TAL; 5	MAR; 5	TEX; 9	PHO; 4	HOM; 5				3rd	812
2015	Austin Theriault	29	Ford	DAY; 4			KAN; 14			TEX; 5	GTW; 10	IOW; 12							CHI; 13	NHA; 8	LVS; 31					HOM; 12			9th	755
2015	Brad Keselowski	29	Ford		ATL; 15			CLT; 5						ELD; 28	POC; 30														9th	755
2015	Joey Logano	29	Ford			MAR; 1*																							9th	755
2015	Ryan Blaney	29	Ford						DOV; 7				KEN; 3			MCH; 2	BRI; 1							TEX; 3					9th	755
2015	Alex Tagliani	29	Ford															MSP; 5											9th	755
2015	Brian Keselowski	29	Ford																			TAL; 17							9th	755
2015	Austin Cindric	29	Ford																				MAR; 25		PHO; 14				9th	755
2016	Tyler Reddick	29	Ford	DAY; 18	ATL; 14	MAR; 20	KAN; 13	DOV; 7	CLT; 4	TEX; 5	IOW; 5	GTW; 25	KEN; 10	ELD; 5	POC; 26	BRI; 14	MCH; 19	MSP; 6	CHI; 10	NHA; 4	LVS; 1*	TAL; 26	MAR; 17	TEX; 4	PHO; 12	HOM; 2			10th	511
2017	Chase Briscoe	29	Ford	DAY; 3	ATL; 25	MAR; 11	KAN; 5	CLT; 11	DOV; 12	TEX; 2	GTW; 2*	IOW; 7	KEN; 11	ELD; 3	POC; 9	MCH; 9	BRI; 12	MSP; 7	CHI; 2	NHA; 11	LVS; 3	TAL; 22	MAR; 19	TEX; 4	PHO; 4	HOM; 1*			9th	862

== ARCA Racing Series ==
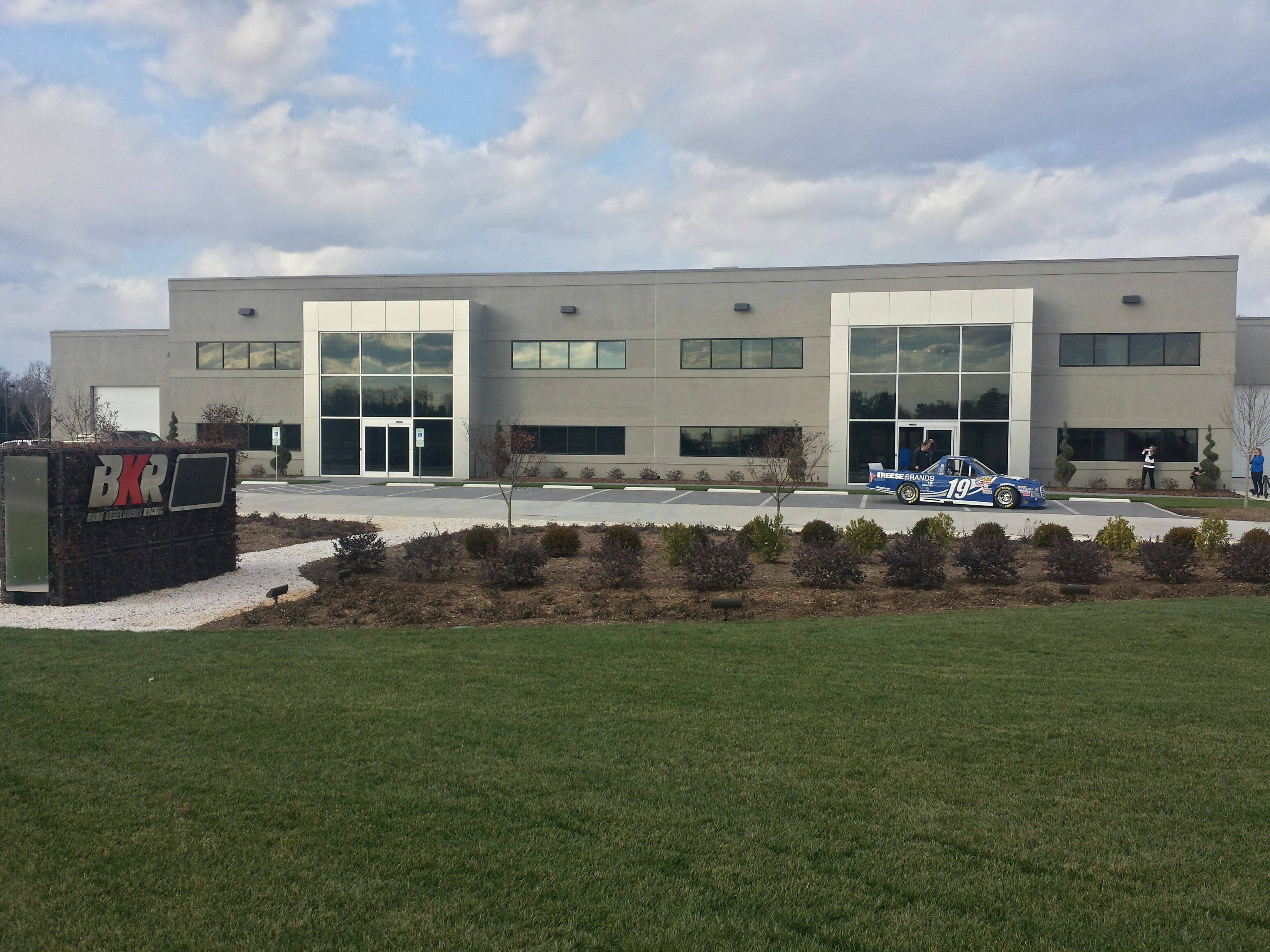
Brad Keselowski Racing's new shop in Statesville, NC

During the team’s inaugural season in 2007, BKR competed in select events in the ARCA Racing Series. With Robb Brent behind the wheel of the No. 00, the team earned one top-10 finish at Nashville Superspeedway. In 2009, Keselowski entered a part-time ARCA entry for DeWitt, Michigan driver, 17-year-old Chad Finley, son of former ARCA winner Jeff Finley. Finley won his first-career pole at Rockingham Speedway, though late race contact would relegate Finley to 15th in the final rundown. In 2010, Finley ran the No. 29 Chevrolet in a six ARCA races with sponsorship from Auto Value and Air Lift Services. His best finish of third was achieved at both Pocono and Rockingham.

== Late model racing ==
BKR at one time also fielded an Outlaw Super Late Model, in Michigan, where Brad Keselowski is originally from. Australian driver Andrew Hagen moved to Michigan in 2009 to drive the car, originally from an open wheel/road racing background, using this class to gain experience in closed-body stock cars.
