= 2015 Ford EcoBoost 200 =

23rd race of the 2015 NASCAR Camping World Truck Series

Race details
- Race 23 of 23 of the 2015 NASCAR Camping World Truck Series
- Date: November 20, 2015
- Official name: 20th Annual Ford EcoBoost 200
- Location: Homestead–Miami Speedway, Homestead, Florida
- Course: Permanent racing facility
- Course length: 1.5 miles (2.4 km)
- Distance: 134 laps, 201 mi (323 km)
- Scheduled distance: 134 laps, 201 mi (323 km)
- Average speed: 126.725 mph (203.944 km/h)

Pole position
Driver	Matt Crafton	ThorSport Racing
- Time: 32.229

Most laps led
Driver	Matt Crafton	ThorSport Racing
- Laps: 93

Winner
No. 88	Matt Crafton	ThorSport Racing

Television in the United States
- Network: FS1
- Announcers: Adam Alexander, Phil Parsons, and Michael Waltrip

Radio in the United States
- Radio: MRN

The 2015 Ford EcoBoost 200 was the 23rd and final stock car race of the 2015 NASCAR Camping World Truck Series, and the 20th iteration of the event. The race was held on Friday, November 20, 2015, in Homestead, Florida at Homestead–Miami Speedway, a 1.5 mi (2.4 km) permanent oval shaped racetrack. The race took the scheduled 134 laps to complete. Matt Crafton, driving for ThorSport Racing, would start from the pole and dominate the entire race, leading a race-high 93 laps and earning his 11th career NASCAR Camping World Truck Series win, and his sixth of the season. To fill out the podium, John Hunter Nemechek, driving for family-owned SWM-NEMCO Motorsports, and Tyler Reddick, driving for Brad Keselowski Racing, would finish 2nd and 3rd, respectively.

Meanwhile, Erik Jones, who finished in 6th, would claim the 2015 NASCAR Camping World Truck Series championship, becoming the youngest champion in the series at 19 years, 5 months, and 21 days.

== Background ==
The layout of Homestead–Miami Speedway, the circuit where the race was held.

Homestead–Miami Speedway is a motor racing track located in Homestead, Florida. The track, which has several configurations, has promoted several series of racing, including NASCAR, the IndyCar Series, the WeatherTech SportsCar Championship series, and the Championship Cup Series.

From 2002 to 2019, Homestead–Miami Speedway hosted the final race of the season in all three of NASCAR's series: the Sprint Cup Series, Xfinity Series, and the Camping World Truck Series. Ford Motor Company sponsored all three of the season-ending races, under the names Ford EcoBoost 400, Ford EcoBoost 300, and Ford EcoBoost 200, respectively. The weekend itself was marketed as Ford Championship Weekend.

=== Entry list ===
- (R) denotes rookie driver.
- (i) denotes driver who is ineligible for series driver points.

#	Driver	Team	Make	Sponsor
0	Scott Lagasse Jr. (i)	NTS Motorsports	Chevrolet	Florida DOT, Boy Scouts of America
1	Dexter Stacey	MAKE Motorsports	Chevrolet	Maddie's Place
02	Tyler Young	Young's Motorsports	Chevrolet	AKL Insurance Group, Young's
4	Erik Jones (R)	Kyle Busch Motorsports	Toyota	Toyota
05	John Wes Townley	Athenian Motorsports	Chevrolet	Zaxby's
6	Norm Benning	Norm Benning Racing	Chevrolet	Norm Benning Racing
07	Ray Black Jr. (R)	SS-Green Light Racing	Chevrolet	ScubaLife
08	Korbin Forrister (R)	BJMM with SS-Green Light Racing	Chevrolet	Tilted Kilt
8	John Hunter Nemechek (R)	SWM-NEMCO Motorsports	Chevrolet	SWM-NEMCO Motorsports
10	Jennifer Jo Cobb	Jennifer Jo Cobb Racing	Chevrolet	UTA.org
11	Ben Kennedy	Red Horse Racing	Toyota	Florida Lottery
13	Cameron Hayley (R)	ThorSport Racing	Toyota	Mattei, Carolina Nut Co.
14	Daniel Hemric (R)	NTS Motorsports	Chevrolet	California Clean Power
15	Mason Mingus	Billy Boat Motorsports	Chevrolet	Call 811 Before You Dig
17	Timothy Peters	Red Horse Racing	Toyota	Red Horse Racing
18	Ross Kenseth (i)	Hattori Racing Enterprises	Toyota	Green Brave, Saitama Toyopet
19	Tyler Reddick	Brad Keselowski Racing	Ford	BBR Music Group
23	Spencer Gallagher (R)	GMS Racing	Chevrolet	Allegiant Travel Company
29	Austin Theriault (R)	Brad Keselowski Racing	Ford	Cooper-Standard Automotive
31	Rico Abreu	NTS Motorsports	Chevrolet	GunBroker.com
33	Brandon Jones (R)	GMS Racing	Chevrolet	Lucas Oil
36	Bobby Pierce	MB Motorsports	Chevrolet	Pixographs.com
45	Todd Peck	Peck Motorsports	Chevrolet	Boobitrap, Arthritis Foundation
50	Travis Kvapil	MAKE Motorsports	Chevrolet	CorvetteParts.net
51	Daniel Suárez (i)	Kyle Busch Motorsports	Toyota	Arris
54	Christopher Bell	Kyle Busch Motorsports	Toyota	JBL
58	Kyle Weatherman	Lira Motorsports	Ford	LifeXist, Massage LUXE
59	David Levine	Lira Motorsports	Ford	Furman University, MOMO
63	Garrett Smithley	MB Motorsports	Chevrolet	NIMITZ, Adama
74	Jordan Anderson	Mike Harmon Racing	Chevrolet	Simmons & White, Columbia SC
86	Brandon Brown	Brandonbilt Motorsports	Chevrolet	Coastal Carolina University
88	Matt Crafton	ThorSport Racing	Toyota	Ideal Door, Menards
92	David Gilliland (i)	RBR Enterprises	Ford	Black's Tire Service
94	Timmy Hill	Premium Motorsports	Chevrolet	Testoril, Champion Machinery
97	Jesse Little	JJL Motorsports	Toyota	Protect the Harvest
98	Johnny Sauter	ThorSport Racing	Toyota	Nextant Aerospace, Curb Records
Official entry list

== Practice ==
The first and only practice session was held on Friday, November 20, at 9:00 AM EST, and would last for 2 hours and 25 minutes. Daniel Hemric, driving for NTS Motorsports, would set the fastest time in the session, with a lap of 31.970, and an average speed of 168.908 mph (271.831 km/h).

Pos.	#	Driver	Team	Make	Time	Speed
1	14	Daniel Hemric (R)	NTS Motorsports	Chevrolet	31.970	168.908
2	19	Tyler Reddick	Brad Keselowski Racing	Ford	31.986	168.824
3	23	Spencer Gallagher (R)	GMS Racing	Chevrolet	32.063	168.418
Full practice results

== Qualifying ==
Qualifying was held on Friday, November 20, at 4:10 PM EST. The qualifying system used is a multi car, multi lap, two round system where in the first round, everyone would set a time to determine positions 13–32. Then, the fastest 12 qualifiers would move on to the second round to determine positions 1–12.

Matt Crafton, driving for ThorSport Racing, would win the pole after advancing from the preliminary round and setting the fastest time in Round 2, with a lap of 32.229, and an average speed of 167.551 mph (269.647 km/h).

Ross Kenseth, Bobby Pierce, Todd Peck, and Norm Benning would fail to qualify.

=== Full qualifying results ===
Pos.	#	Driver	Team	Make	Time (R1)	Speed (R1)	Time (R2)	Speed (R2)
1	88	Matt Crafton	ThorSport Racing	Toyota	32.338	166.986	32.229	167.551
2	8	John Hunter Nemechek (R)	SWM-NEMCO Motorsports	Chevrolet	32.197	167.717	32.335	167.002
3	11	Ben Kennedy	Red Horse Racing	Toyota	32.329	167.033	32.351	166.919
4	19	Tyler Reddick	Brad Keselowski Racing	Ford	32.281	167.281	32.357	166.888
5	4	Erik Jones (R)	Kyle Busch Motorsports	Toyota	32.318	167.090	32.363	166.857
6	51	Daniel Suárez (i)	Kyle Busch Motorsports	Toyota	32.586	165.715	32.383	166.754
7	14	Daniel Hemric (R)	NTS Motorsports	Chevrolet	32.302	167.172	32.424	166.543
8	23	Spencer Gallagher (R)	GMS Racing	Chevrolet	32.486	166.225	32.460	166.359
9	54	Christopher Bell	Kyle Busch Motorsports	Toyota	32.483	166.241	32.477	166.272
10	98	Johnny Sauter	ThorSport Racing	Toyota	32.674	165.269	32.501	166.149
11	13	Cameron Hayley (R)	ThorSport Racing	Toyota	32.537	165.965	32.523	166.036
12	17	Timothy Peters	Red Horse Racing	Toyota	32.555	165.873	32.727	165.001
Eliminated from Round 1
13	05	John Wes Townley	Athenian Motorsports	Chevrolet	32.690	165.188	–	–
14	31	Rico Abreu	NTS Motorsports	Chevrolet	32.700	165.138	–	–
15	92	David Gilliland (i)	RBR Enterprises	Ford	32.828	164.494	–	–
16	0	Scott Lagasse Jr. (i)	NTS Motorsports	Chevrolet	32.868	164.294	–	–
17	33	Brandon Jones (R)	GMS Racing	Chevrolet	32.939	163.939	–	–
18	29	Austin Theriault (R)	Brad Keselowski Racing	Ford	32.969	163.790	–	–
19	97	Jesse Little	JJL Motorsports	Toyota	32.971	163.780	–	–
20	15	Mason Mingus	Billy Boat Motorsports	Chevrolet	33.242	162.445	–	–
21	58	Kyle Weatherman	Lira Motorsports	Ford	33.374	161.803	–	–
22	59	David Levine	Lira Motorsports	Ford	33.524	161.079	–	–
23	02	Tyler Young	Young's Motorsports	Chevrolet	33.605	160.690	–	–
24	10	Jennifer Jo Cobb	Jennifer Jo Cobb Racing	Chevrolet	33.631	160.566	–	–
25	94	Timmy Hill	Premium Motorsports	Chevrolet	33.632	160.561	–	–
26	86	Brandon Brown	Brandonbilt Motorsports	Chevrolet	33.726	160.114	–	–
27	07	Ray Black Jr. (R)	SS-Green Light Racing	Chevrolet	33.817	159.683	–	–
Qualified by owner's points
28	50	Travis Kvapil	MAKE Motorsports	Chevrolet	33.820	159.669	–	–
29	63	Garrett Smithley	MB Motorsports	Chevrolet	34.146	158.144	–	–
30	74	Jordan Anderson	Mike Harmon Racing	Chevrolet	34.461	156.699	–	–
31	08	Korbin Forrister (R)	BJMM with SS-Green Light Racing	Chevrolet	36.222	149.081	–	–
32	1	Dexter Stacey	MAKE Motorsports	Chevrolet	–	–	–	–
Failed to qualify
33	18	Ross Kenseth (i)	Hattori Racing Enterprises	Toyota	33.899	159.297	–	–
34	36	Bobby Pierce	MB Motorsports	Chevrolet	33.982	158.908	–	–
35	45	Todd Peck	Peck Motorsports	Chevrolet	34.216	157.821	–	–
36	6	Norm Benning	Norm Benning Racing	Chevrolet	35.212	153.357	–	–
Official qualifying results
Official starting lineup

== Race results ==
Fin	St	#	Driver	Team	Make	Laps	Led	Status	Pts	Winnings
1	1	88	Matt Crafton	ThorSport Racing	Toyota	134	93	Running	48	$53,598
2	2	8	John Hunter Nemechek (R)	SWM-NEMCO Motorsports	Chevrolet	134	24	Running	43	$32,308
3	4	19	Tyler Reddick	Brad Keselowski Racing	Ford	134	1	Running	42	$30,084
4	3	11	Ben Kennedy	Red Horse Racing	Toyota	134	0	Running	40	$25,597
5	12	17	Timothy Peters	Red Horse Racing	Toyota	134	0	Running	39	$22,449
6	5	4	Erik Jones (R)	Kyle Busch Motorsports	Toyota	134	0	Running	38	$20,382
7	10	98	Johnny Sauter	ThorSport Racing	Toyota	134	0	Running	37	$20,164
8	7	14	Daniel Hemric (R)	NTS Motorsports	Chevrolet	134	0	Running	36	$19,945
9	11	13	Cameron Hayley (R)	ThorSport Racing	Toyota	134	0	Running	35	$19,727
10	13	05	John Wes Townley	Athenian Motorsports	Chevrolet	134	1	Running	35	$20,458
11	8	23	Spencer Gallagher (R)	GMS Racing	Chevrolet	134	0	Running	33	$19,399
12	18	29	Austin Theriault (R)	Brad Keselowski Racing	Ford	134	0	Running	32	$19,206
13	14	31	Rico Abreu	NTS Motorsports	Chevrolet	134	0	Running	31	$19,070
14	19	97	Jesse Little	JJL Motorsports	Toyota	134	0	Running	30	$16,710
15	16	0	Scott Lagasse Jr. (i)	NTS Motorsports	Chevrolet	134	0	Running	0	$17,201
16	15	92	David Gilliland (i)	RBR Enterprises	Ford	133	0	Running	0	$16,464
17	22	59	David Levine	Lira Motorsports	Ford	133	0	Running	27	$16,355
18	27	07	Ray Black Jr. (R)	SS-Green Light Racing	Chevrolet	133	0	Running	26	$18,496
19	23	02	Tyler Young	Young's Motorsports	Chevrolet	133	0	Running	25	$18,386
20	20	15	Mason Mingus	Billy Boat Motorsports	Chevrolet	132	0	Running	24	$18,755
21	25	94	Timmy Hill	Premium Motorsports	Chevrolet	132	0	Running	23	$18,032
22	28	50	Travis Kvapil	MAKE Motorsports	Chevrolet	132	0	Running	22	$17,758
23	21	58	Kyle Weatherman	Lira Motorsports	Ford	131	0	Running	21	$15,372
24	32	1	Dexter Stacey	MAKE Motorsports	Chevrolet	131	0	Running	20	$16,044
25	9	54	Christopher Bell	Kyle Busch Motorsports	Toyota	130	5	Out of Fuel	19	$15,976
26	24	10	Jennifer Jo Cobb	Jennifer Jo Cobb Racing	Chevrolet	128	0	Running	18	$14,607
27	31	08	Korbin Forrister (R)	BJMM with SS-Green Light Racing	Chevrolet	127	0	Running	17	$14,389
28	29	63	Garrett Smithley	MB Motorsports	Chevrolet	126	0	Running	16	$12,799
29	30	74	Jordan Anderson	Mike Harmon Racing	Chevrolet	115	0	Running	15	$12,553
30	6	51	Daniel Suárez (i)	Kyle Busch Motorsports	Toyota	84	10	Accident	0	$11,553
31	17	33	Brandon Jones (R)	GMS Racing	Chevrolet	67	0	Accident	13	$11,053
32	26	86	Brandon Brown	Brandonbilt Motorsports	Chevrolet	2	0	Transmission	12	$9,553
Official race results

== Standings after the race ==
Drivers' Championship standings

Pos	Driver	Points
1	Erik Jones	899
2	Tyler Reddick	884 (-15)
3	Matt Crafton	877 (–22)
4	Johnny Sauter	809 (–90)
5	Timothy Peters	804 (–95)
6	Cameron Hayley	766 (–133)
7	Daniel Hemric	733 (–166)
8	John Wes Townley	730 (–169)
9	Ben Kennedy	690 (–209)
10	Spencer Gallagher	677 (–222)
Official driver's standings

- Note: Only the first 10 positions are included for the driver standings.

Previous race: 2015 Lucas Oil 150	NASCAR Camping World Truck Series; 2015 season	Next race: 2016 NextEra Energy Resources 250
