= 2017 LTi Printing 200 =

13th race of the 2017 NASCAR Camping World Truck Series

Race details
- Race 13 of 23 of the 2017 NASCAR Camping World Truck Series
- Date: August 12, 2017
- Official name: 18th Annual LTi Printing 200
- Location: Brooklyn, Michigan, Michigan International Speedway
- Course: Permanent racing facility
- Course length: 2 miles (3.2 km)
- Distance: 100 laps, 200 mi (321.868 km)
- Scheduled distance: 100 laps, 200 mi (321.868 km)
- Average speed: 126.493 miles per hour (203.571 km/h)

Pole position
Driver	Matt Crafton	ThorSport Racing
- Time: 39.076

Most laps led
Driver	Kyle Busch	Kyle Busch Motorsports
- Laps: 47

Winner
No. 99	Bubba Wallace	MDM Motorsports

Television in the United States
- Network: FOX
- Announcers: Vince Welch, Phil Parsons, Michael Waltrip

Radio in the United States
- Radio: Motor Racing Network

The 2017 LTi Printing 200 was the 13th stock car race of the 2017 NASCAR Camping World Truck Series and the 18th iteration of the event. The race was held on Saturday, August 12, 2017, in Brooklyn, Michigan at Michigan International Speedway, a two-mile (3.2 km) permanent moderate-banked D-shaped speedway. The race took the scheduled 100 laps to complete. At race's end, Bubba Wallace, driving for MDM Motorsports, would defend fiercely for the final 11 laps of the race to win his sixth and to date, final career NASCAR Camping World Truck Series win and his only win of the season. To fill out the podium, Christopher Bell and Kyle Busch, both driving for Kyle Busch Motorsports, would finish second and third, respectively.

== Background ==
The layout of Michigan International Speedway, the venue where the race was held.

The race was held at Michigan International Speedway, a two-mile (3.2 km) moderate-banked D-shaped speedway located in Brooklyn, Michigan. The track is used primarily for NASCAR events. It is known as a "sister track" to Texas World Speedway as MIS's oval design was a direct basis of TWS, with moderate modifications to the banking in the corners, and was used as the basis of Auto Club Speedway. The track is owned by International Speedway Corporation. Michigan International Speedway is recognized as one of motorsports' premier facilities because of its wide racing surface and high banking (by open-wheel standards; the 18-degree banking is modest by stock car standards).

=== Entry list ===
- (R) denotes rookie driver.
- (i) denotes driver who is ineligible for series driver points.

#	Driver	Team	Make	Sponsor
0	Ray Ciccarelli	Jennifer Jo Cobb Racing	Chevrolet	Driven 2 Honor
1	Jordan Anderson	TJL Motorsports	Chevrolet	Sturgis Bank & Trust, Kool
02	Tyler Young	Young's Motorsports	Chevrolet	Randco Industries, Young's Building Systems
4	Christopher Bell	Kyle Busch Motorsports	Toyota	SiriusXM, JBL
6	Norm Benning	Norm Benning Racing	Chevrolet	Norm Benning Racing
8	John Hunter Nemechek	NEMCO Motorsports	Chevrolet	Fire Alarm Services
10	Jennifer Jo Cobb	Jennifer Jo Cobb Racing	Chevrolet	Driven 2 Honor
13	Cody Coughlin (R)	ThorSport Racing	Toyota	RIDE TV
16	Ryan Truex	Hattori Racing Enterprises	Toyota	Hino
18	Noah Gragson (R)	Kyle Busch Motorsports	Toyota	Switch
19	Austin Cindric (R)	Brad Keselowski Racing	Ford	Reese Brands, DrawTite
21	Johnny Sauter	GMS Racing	Chevrolet	GMS Racing
24	Justin Haley (R)	GMS Racing	Chevrolet	Fraternal Order of Eagles
27	Ben Rhodes	ThorSport Racing	Toyota	Safelite Auto Glass
29	Chase Briscoe (R)	Brad Keselowski Racing	Ford	Cooper-Standard
33	Kaz Grala (R)	GMS Racing	Chevrolet	Charge Cords
36	Camden Murphy	MB Motorsports	Chevrolet	Fr8Auctions
44	Austin Wayne Self	Martins Motorsports	Chevrolet	AM Technical Solutions, Don't Mess with Texas
45	T. J. Bell	Niece Motorsports	Chevrolet	Niece Motorsports
49	Wendell Chavous (R)	Premium Motorsports	Chevrolet	JAS Expedited Trucking
50	Josh Reaume	Beaver Motorsports	Chevrolet	Pit Barrel Cooker
51	Kyle Busch (i)	Kyle Busch Motorsports	Toyota	Textron, Beechcraft
52	Stewart Friesen (R)	Halmar Friesen Racing	Chevrolet	Halmar
57	Mike Senica	Norm Benning Racing	Chevrolet	Bell Plantation
63	B. J. McLeod (i)	MB Motorsports	Chevrolet	MB Motorsports
83	Todd Peck	Copp Motorsports	Chevrolet	Pulse Transport
87	Joe Nemechek	NEMCO Motorsports	Chevrolet	NEMCO Motorsports
88	Matt Crafton	ThorSport Racing	Toyota	Menards, Ideal Door
98	Grant Enfinger (R)	ThorSport Racing	Toyota	Champion Power Equipment
99	Bubba Wallace (i)	MDM Motorsports	Chevrolet	Maestro's
Official entry list

== Practice ==
=== First practice ===
The first practice session was held on Friday, August 11, at 1:00 PM EST, and would last for 55 minutes. Matt Crafton of ThorSport Racing would set the fastest time in the session, with a lap of 38.350 and an average speed of 187.744 miles per hour (302.145 km/h).

Pos.	#	Driver	Team	Make	Time	Speed
1	88	Matt Crafton	ThorSport Racing	Toyota	38.350	187.744
2	29	Chase Briscoe (R)	Brad Keselowski Racing	Ford	38.477	187.125
3	98	Grant Enfinger (R)	ThorSport Racing	Toyota	38.490	187.062
Full first practice results

=== Second and final practice ===
The second and final practice session, sometimes known as Happy Hour, was held on Friday, August 11, at 3:00 PM EST, and would last for 55 minutes. John Hunter Nemechek of NEMCO Motorsports would set the fastest time in the session, with a lap of 38.545 and an average speed of 186.795 miles per hour (300.617 km/h).

Pos.	#	Driver	Team	Make	Time	Speed
1	8	John Hunter Nemechek	NEMCO Motorsports	Chevrolet	38.545	186.795
2	21	Johnny Sauter	GMS Racing	Chevrolet	38.571	186.669
3	88	Matt Crafton	ThorSport Racing	Toyota	38.662	186.229
Full Happy Hour practice results

== Qualifying ==
Qualifying was held on Saturday, August 12, at 9:30 AM EST. Since Michigan International Speedway is at least 1.5 miles (2.4 km), the qualifying system was a single car, single lap, two round system where in the first round, everyone would set a time to determine positions 13–32. Then, the fastest 12 qualifiers would move on to the second round to determine positions 1–12.

Matt Crafton of ThorSport Racing would win the pole, setting a lap of 39.076 and an average speed of 184.256 miles per hour (296.531 km/h) in the second round.

No drivers would fail to qualify.

=== Full qualifying results ===
Pos.	#	Driver	Team	Make	Time (R1)	Speed (R1)	Time (R2)	Speed (R2)
1	88	Matt Crafton	ThorSport Racing	Toyota	39.148	183.917	39.076	184.256
2	21	Johnny Sauter	GMS Racing	Chevrolet	39.130	184.002	39.140	183.955
3	8	John Hunter Nemechek	NEMCO Motorsports	Chevrolet	39.212	183.617	39.175	183.791
4	29	Chase Briscoe (R)	Brad Keselowski Racing	Ford	39.380	182.834	39.201	183.669
5	18	Noah Gragson (R)	Kyle Busch Motorsports	Toyota	39.370	182.880	39.301	183.201
6	98	Grant Enfinger (R)	ThorSport Racing	Toyota	39.401	182.736	39.316	183.132
7	24	Justin Haley (R)	GMS Racing	Chevrolet	39.381	182.829	39.403	182.727
8	19	Austin Cindric (R)	Brad Keselowski Racing	Ford	39.440	182.556	39.463	182.449
9	99	Bubba Wallace (i)	MDM Motorsports	Chevrolet	39.531	182.136	39.509	182.237
10	51	Kyle Busch (i)	Kyle Busch Motorsports	Toyota	39.519	182.191	39.527	182.154
11	16	Ryan Truex	Hattori Racing Enterprises	Toyota	39.671	181.493	39.630	181.681
12	33	Kaz Grala (R)	GMS Racing	Chevrolet	39.668	181.507	39.663	181.529
Eliminated in Round 1
13	4	Christopher Bell	Kyle Busch Motorsports	Toyota	39.714	181.296	-	-
14	27	Ben Rhodes	ThorSport Racing	Toyota	39.830	180.768	-	-
15	13	Cody Coughlin (R)	ThorSport Racing	Toyota	39.833	180.755	-	-
16	52	Stewart Friesen (R)	Halmar Friesen Racing	Chevrolet	39.844	180.705	-	-
17	02	Tyler Young	Young's Motorsports	Chevrolet	40.030	179.865	-	-
18	49	Wendell Chavous (R)	Premium Motorsports	Chevrolet	40.714	176.843	-	-
19	45	T. J. Bell	Niece Motorsports	Chevrolet	40.824	176.367	-	-
20	44	Austin Wayne Self	Martins Motorsports	Chevrolet	40.896	176.056	-	-
21	0	Ray Ciccarelli	Jennifer Jo Cobb Racing	Chevrolet	41.023	175.511	-	-
22	63	B. J. McLeod (i)	MB Motorsports	Chevrolet	41.062	175.345	-	-
23	87	Joe Nemechek	NEMCO Motorsports	Chevrolet	41.193	174.787	-	-
24	50	Josh Reaume	Beaver Motorsports	Chevrolet	41.275	174.440	-	-
25	83	Todd Peck	Copp Motorsports	Chevrolet	41.462	173.653	-	-
26	1	Jordan Anderson	TJL Motorsports	Chevrolet	41.496	173.511	-	-
27	36	Camden Murphy	MB Motorsports	Chevrolet	41.791	172.286	-	-
28	6	Norm Benning	Norm Benning Racing	Chevrolet	42.925	167.734	-	-
29	10	Jennifer Jo Cobb	Jennifer Jo Cobb Racing	Chevrolet	43.330	166.167	-	-
30	57	Mike Senica	Norm Benning Racing	Chevrolet	45.684	157.604	-	-
Official qualifying results
Official starting lineup

== Race results ==
Stage 1 Laps: 30

Pos.	#	Driver	Team	Make	Pts
1	51	Kyle Busch (i)	Kyle Busch Motorsports	Toyota	0
2	29	Chase Briscoe (R)	Brad Keselowski Racing	Ford	9
3	88	Matt Crafton	ThorSport Racing	Toyota	8
4	27	Ben Rhodes	ThorSport Racing	Toyota	7
5	21	Johnny Sauter	GMS Racing	Chevrolet	6
6	19	Austin Cindric (R)	Brad Keselowski Racing	Ford	5
7	18	Noah Gragson (R)	Kyle Busch Motorsports	Toyota	4
8	16	Ryan Truex	Hattori Racing Enterprises	Toyota	3
9	99	Bubba Wallace (i)	MDM Motorsports	Chevrolet	0
10	4	Christopher Bell	Kyle Busch Motorsports	Toyota	1

Stage 2 Laps: 30

Pos.	#	Driver	Team	Make	Pts
1	51	Kyle Busch (i)	Kyle Busch Motorsports	Toyota	0
2	16	Ryan Truex	Hattori Racing Enterprises	Toyota	9
3	4	Christopher Bell	Kyle Busch Motorsports	Toyota	8
4	88	Matt Crafton	ThorSport Racing	Toyota	7
5	27	Ben Rhodes	ThorSport Racing	Toyota	6
6	33	Kaz Grala (R)	GMS Racing	Chevrolet	5
7	24	Justin Haley (R)	GMS Racing	Chevrolet	4
8	18	Noah Gragson (R)	Kyle Busch Motorsports	Toyota	3
9	29	Chase Briscoe (R)	Brad Keselowski Racing	Ford	2
10	98	Grant Enfinger (R)	ThorSport Racing	Toyota	1

Stage 3 Laps: 40

Fin	St	#	Driver	Team	Make	Laps	Led	Status	Pts
1	9	99	Bubba Wallace (i)	MDM Motorsports	Chevrolet	100	11	running	0
2	13	4	Christopher Bell	Kyle Busch Motorsports	Toyota	100	0	running	44
3	10	51	Kyle Busch (i)	Kyle Busch Motorsports	Toyota	100	47	running	0
4	11	16	Ryan Truex	Hattori Racing Enterprises	Toyota	100	0	running	45
5	8	19	Austin Cindric (R)	Brad Keselowski Racing	Ford	100	24	running	37
6	1	88	Matt Crafton	ThorSport Racing	Toyota	100	10	running	46
7	5	18	Noah Gragson (R)	Kyle Busch Motorsports	Toyota	100	0	running	37
8	6	98	Grant Enfinger (R)	ThorSport Racing	Toyota	100	0	running	30
9	4	29	Chase Briscoe (R)	Brad Keselowski Racing	Ford	100	4	running	39
10	7	24	Justin Haley (R)	GMS Racing	Chevrolet	100	3	running	31
11	14	27	Ben Rhodes	ThorSport Racing	Toyota	100	0	running	39
12	12	33	Kaz Grala (R)	GMS Racing	Chevrolet	100	0	running	30
13	16	52	Stewart Friesen (R)	Halmar Friesen Racing	Chevrolet	100	0	running	24
14	17	02	Tyler Young	Young's Motorsports	Chevrolet	100	0	running	23
15	20	44	Austin Wayne Self	Martins Motorsports	Chevrolet	100	0	running	22
16	19	45	T. J. Bell	Niece Motorsports	Chevrolet	99	0	running	21
17	18	49	Wendell Chavous (R)	Premium Motorsports	Chevrolet	99	0	running	20
18	2	21	Johnny Sauter	GMS Racing	Chevrolet	99	1	running	25
19	24	50	Josh Reaume	Beaver Motorsports	Chevrolet	98	0	running	18
20	28	6	Norm Benning	Norm Benning Racing	Chevrolet	82	0	vibration	17
21	15	13	Cody Coughlin (R)	ThorSport Racing	Toyota	65	0	crash	16
22	29	10	Jennifer Jo Cobb	Jennifer Jo Cobb Racing	Chevrolet	48	0	engine	15
23	26	1	Jordan Anderson	TJL Motorsports	Chevrolet	33	0	engine	14
24	22	63	B. J. McLeod (i)	MB Motorsports	Chevrolet	16	0	vibration	0
25	27	36	Camden Murphy	MB Motorsports	Chevrolet	12	0	electrical	12
26	21	0	Ray Ciccarelli	Jennifer Jo Cobb Racing	Chevrolet	11	0	fuel pump	11
27	30	57	Mike Senica	Norm Benning Racing	Chevrolet	8	0	brakes	10
28	25	83	Todd Peck	Copp Motorsports	Chevrolet	5	0	engine	9
29	3	8	John Hunter Nemechek	NEMCO Motorsports	Chevrolet	4	0	crash	8
30	23	87	Joe Nemechek	NEMCO Motorsports	Chevrolet	2	0	vibration	7
Official race results

== Standings after the race ==
Drivers' Championship standings

Pos	Driver	Points
1	Christopher Bell	572
2	Johnny Sauter	535 (-37)
3	Matt Crafton	510 (–62)
4	Chase Briscoe	509 (–63)
5	Ryan Truex	431 (–141)
6	Ben Rhodes	426 (–146)
7	Grant Enfinger	412 (–160)
8	John Hunter Nemechek	404 (–168)
Official driver's standings

- Note: Only the first 8 positions are included for the driver standings.

Previous race: 2017 Overton's 150	NASCAR Camping World Truck Series; 2017 season	Next race: 2017 UNOH 200
