= 2017 UNOH 200 =

14th race of the 2017 NASCAR Camping World Truck Series

Race details
- Race 14 of 23 of the 2017 NASCAR Camping World Truck Series
- Date: August 16, 2017
- Official name: 20th Annual UNOH 200
- Location: Bristol, Tennessee, Bristol Motor Speedway
- Course: Permanent racing facility
- Course length: 0.533 miles (0.828 km)
- Distance: 203 laps, 108.199 mi (174.129 km)
- Scheduled distance: 200 laps, 106.6 mi (171.556 km)
- Average speed: 88.829 miles per hour (142.956 km/h)

Pole position
Driver	Kyle Busch	Kyle Busch Motorsports
- Time: 14.827

Most laps led
Driver	Kyle Busch	Kyle Busch Motorsports
- Laps: 109

Winner
No. 46	Kyle Busch	Kyle Busch Motorsports

Television in the United States
- Network: FOX
- Announcers: Vince Welch, Phil Parsons, Michael Waltrip

Radio in the United States
- Radio: Motor Racing Network

The 2017 UNOH 200 was the 14th stock car race of the 2017 NASCAR Camping World Truck Series and the 20th iteration of the event. The race was held on Wednesday, August 16, 2017, in Bristol, Tennessee, at Bristol Motor Speedway a 0.533 miles (0.858 km) permanent oval-shaped racetrack. The race was extended from its scheduled 200 laps to 203 due to a NASCAR overtime finish. At race's end, Kyle Busch, driving for Kyle Busch Motorsports, would manage to overcome a penalty during the final stage to win his 49th career NASCAR Camping World Truck Series win and his third and final win of the season. To fill out the podium, Matt Crafton of ThorSport Racing and John Hunter Nemechek of NEMCO Motorsports would finish second and third, respectively.

== Background ==
The layout of Bristol Motor Speedway, the venue where the race was held.

The Bristol Motor Speedway, formerly known as Bristol International Raceway and Bristol Raceway, is a NASCAR short track venue located in Bristol, Tennessee. Constructed in 1960, it held its first NASCAR race on July 30, 1961. Despite its short length, Bristol is among the most popular tracks on the NASCAR schedule because of its distinct features, which include extraordinarily steep banking, an all concrete surface, two pit roads, and stadium-like seating. It has also been named one of the loudest NASCAR tracks.

=== Entry list ===
- (R) denotes rookie driver.
- (i) denotes driver who is ineligible for series driver points.

#	Driver	Team	Make	Sponsor
1	Jordan Anderson	TJL Motorsports	Chevrolet	Lucas Oil, Capital City Towing
02	Austin Hill	Young's Motorsports	Ford	Young's Motorsports
4	Christopher Bell	Kyle Busch Motorsports	Toyota	Toyota, JBL
6	Norm Benning	Norm Benning Racing	Chevrolet	Norm Benning Racing
8	John Hunter Nemechek	NEMCO Motorsports	Chevrolet	Plan B Sales
10	Jennifer Jo Cobb	Jennifer Jo Cobb Racing	Chevrolet	Driven 2 Honor
13	Cody Coughlin (R)	ThorSport Racing	Toyota	RIDE TV
16	Ryan Truex	Hattori Racing Enterprises	Toyota	Food City, Bar Harbor
18	Noah Gragson (R)	Kyle Busch Motorsports	Toyota	Switch
19	Austin Cindric (R)	Brad Keselowski Racing	Ford	Fitzgerald Glider Kits
21	Johnny Sauter	GMS Racing	Chevrolet	Allegiant Air
24	Justin Haley (R)	GMS Racing	Chevrolet	Fraternal Order of Eagles
27	Ben Rhodes	ThorSport Racing	Toyota	Safelite Auto Glass
29	Chase Briscoe (R)	Brad Keselowski Racing	Ford	Cooper-Standard
33	Kaz Grala (R)	GMS Racing	Chevrolet	Charge Cords
36	Chris Windom	MB Motorsports	Chevrolet	Baldwin Brothers Racing
44	Austin Wayne Self	Martins Motorsports	Chevrolet	AM Technical Solutions, Don't Mess with Texas
45	T. J. Bell	Niece Motorsports	Chevrolet	Niece Motorsports
46	Kyle Busch (i)	Kyle Busch Motorsports	Toyota	Banfield Pet Hospital
49	Wendell Chavous (R)	Premium Motorsports	Chevrolet	Total Truck Centers
50	Josh Reaume	Beaver Motorsports	Chevrolet	Pit Barrel Cooker Co.
51	Harrison Burton	Kyle Busch Motorsports	Toyota	DEX Imaging
52	Stewart Friesen (R)	Halmar Friesen Racing	Chevrolet	Halmar
57	Mike Senica	Norm Benning Racing	Chevrolet	Bell Plantation
63	Landon Huffman	MB Motorsports	Chevrolet	Mittler Bros. Machine & Tool
68	Clay Greenfield	Clay Greenfield Motorsports	Chevrolet	Titan Paint Sprayers, Semper Fi Fund
75	Parker Kligerman	Henderson Motorsports	Toyota	Food Country USA, Anderson's Maple Syrup
83	J. J. Yeley (i)	Copp Motorsports	Chevrolet	Vapor Station, Cue Vapor System
87	Joe Nemechek	NEMCO Motorsports	Chevrolet	Fire Alarm Services
88	Matt Crafton	ThorSport Racing	Toyota	Menards, Great Lakes Flooring
92	Regan Smith	RBR Enterprises	Ford	BTS Tire & Wheel Distributors, Advance Auto Parts
97	Jesse Little	JJL Motorsports	Toyota	Triad CNC
98	Grant Enfinger (R)	ThorSport Racing	Toyota	Champion Power Equipment
99	Brandon Jones (i)	MDM Motorsports	Chevrolet	Russell Refrigeration Products
Official entry list

== Practice ==
=== First practice ===
The first practice session was held on Wednesday, August 16, at 9:00 AM EST, and would last for 55 minutes. Cody Coughlin of ThorSport Racing would set the fastest time in the session, with a lap of 14.828 and an average speed of 129.404 miles per hour (208.256 km/h).

Pos.	#	Driver	Team	Make	Time	Speed
1	13	Cody Coughlin	ThorSport Racing	Toyota	14.828	129.404
2	46	Kyle Busch	Kyle Busch Motorsports	Toyota	14.832	129.369
3	21	Johnny Sauter	GMS Racing	Chevrolet	14.863	129.099
Full first practice results

=== Second and final practice ===
The second and final practice session, sometimes referred to as Happy Hour, was held on Wednesday, August 16, at 11:00 AM EST, and would last for 55 minutes. Kyle Busch of Kyle Busch Motorsports would set the fastest time in the session, with a lap of 14.706 and an average speed of 130.477 miles per hour (209.982 km/h).

Pos.	#	Driver	Team	Make	Time	Speed
1	46	Kyle Busch	Kyle Busch Motorsports	Toyota	14.706	130.477
2	27	Ben Rhodes	ThorSport Racing	Toyota	14.801	129.640
3	4	Christopher Bell	Kyle Busch Motorsports	Toyota	14.816	129.509
Full Happy Hour practice results

== Qualifying ==
Qualifying was held on Wednesday, August 16, at 4:35 PM EST. Since Bristol Motor Speedway is under 1.5 miles (2.4 km), the qualifying system was a multi-car system that included three rounds. The first round was 15 minutes, where every driver would be able to set a lap within the 15 minutes. Then, the second round would consist of the fastest 24 cars in Round 1, and drivers would have 10 minutes to set a lap. Round 3 consisted of the fastest 12 drivers from Round 2, and the drivers would have 5 minutes to set a time. Whoever was fastest in Round 3 would win the pole.

Kyle Busch of Kyle Busch Motorsports would win the pole after advancing from both preliminary rounds and setting the fastest lap in Round 3, with a time of 14.827 and an average speed of 129.413 miles per hour (208.270 km/h).

Two drivers would fail to qualify: Chris Windom and Mike Senica.

=== Full qualifying results ===
Pos.	#	Driver	Team	Make	Time (R1)	Speed (R1)	Time (R2)	Speed (R2)	Time (R3)	Speed (R3)
1	46	Kyle Busch	Kyle Busch Motorsports	Toyota					14.827	129.413
2	4	Christopher Bell	Kyle Busch Motorsports	Toyota					14.920	128.606
3	21	Johnny Sauter	GMS Racing	Chevrolet					14.959	128.271
4	18	Noah Gragson	Kyle Busch Motorsports	Toyota					14.961	128.253
5	99	Brandon Jones (i)	MDM Motorsports	Chevrolet					15.001	127.911
6	88	Matt Crafton	ThorSport Racing	Toyota					15.010	127.835
7	98	Grant Enfinger	ThorSport Racing	Toyota					15.032	127.648
8	13	Cody Coughlin	ThorSport Racing	Toyota					15.036	127.614
9	27	Ben Rhodes	ThorSport Racing	Toyota					15.053	127.470
10	97	Jesse Little	JJL Motorsports	Toyota					15.081	127.233
11	33	Kaz Grala	GMS Racing	Chevrolet					15.087	127.182
12	24	Justin Haley	GMS Racing	Chevrolet					15.260	125.740
Eliminated in Round 2
13	51	Harrison Burton	Kyle Busch Motorsports	Toyota			15.071	127.317	-	-
14	8	John Hunter Nemechek	NEMCO Motorsports	Chevrolet			15.077	127.267	-	-
15	29	Chase Briscoe	Brad Keselowski Racing	Ford			15.082	127.225	-	-
16	75	Parker Kligerman	Henderson Motorsports	Toyota			15.087	127.182	-	-
17	16	Ryan Truex	Hattori Racing Enterprises	Toyota			15.098	127.090	-	-
18	19	Austin Cindric	Brad Keselowski Racing	Ford			15.099	127.081	-	-
19	92	Regan Smith	RBR Enterprises	Ford			15.180	126.403	-	-
20	52	Stewart Friesen	Halmar Friesen Racing	Chevrolet			15.241	125.897	-	-
21	63	Landon Huffman	MB Motorsports	Chevrolet			15.254	125.790	-	-
22	02	Austin Hill	Young's Motorsports	Ford			15.339	125.093	-	-
23	68	Clay Greenfield	Clay Greenfield Motorsports	Chevrolet			15.433	124.331	-	-
24	87	Joe Nemechek	NEMCO Motorsports	Chevrolet	15.186	126.353	-	-	-	-
Eliminated in Round 1
25	83	J. J. Yeley	Copp Motorsports	Chevrolet	15.409	124.525	-	-	-	-
26	45	T. J. Bell	Niece Motorsports	Chevrolet	15.442	124.259	-	-	-	-
27	44	Austin Wayne Self	Martins Motorsports	Chevrolet	15.618	122.858	-	-	-	-
Qualified by owner's points
28	49	Wendell Chavous	Premium Motorsports	Chevrolet	16.004	119.895	-	-	-	-
29	50	Josh Reaume	Beaver Motorsports	Chevrolet	16.022	119.760	-	-	-	-
30	10	Jennifer Jo Cobb	Jennifer Jo Cobb Racing	Chevrolet	16.149	118.819	-	-	-	-
31	6	Norm Benning	Norm Benning Racing	Chevrolet	18.334	104.658	-	-	-	-
32	1	Jordan Anderson	TJL Motorsports	Chevrolet	-	-	-	-	-	-
Failed to qualify
33	36	Chris Windom	MB Motorsports	Chevrolet	15.827	121.236	-	-	-	-
34	57	Mike Senica	Norm Benning Racing	Chevrolet	22.335	85.910	-	-	-	-
Official starting lineup

== Race results ==
Stage 1 Laps: 55

Pos.	#	Driver	Team	Make	Pts
1	46	Kyle Busch (i)	Kyle Busch Motorsports	Toyota	0
2	18	Noah Gragson (R)	Kyle Busch Motorsports	Toyota	9
3	88	Matt Crafton	ThorSport Racing	Toyota	8
4	4	Christopher Bell	Kyle Busch Motorsports	Toyota	7
5	98	Grant Enfinger (R)	ThorSport Racing	Toyota	6
6	99	Brandon Jones (i)	MDM Motorsports	Chevrolet	0
7	27	Ben Rhodes	ThorSport Racing	Toyota	4
8	21	Johnny Sauter	GMS Racing	Chevrolet	3
9	24	Justin Haley (R)	GMS Racing	Chevrolet	2
10	75	Parker Kligerman	Henderson Motorsports	Toyota	1

Stage 2 Laps: 55

Pos.	#	Driver	Team	Make	Pts
1	46	Kyle Busch (i)	Kyle Busch Motorsports	Toyota	0
2	88	Matt Crafton	ThorSport Racing	Toyota	9
3	19	Austin Cindric (R)	Brad Keselowski Racing	Ford	8
4	27	Ben Rhodes	ThorSport Racing	Toyota	7
5	4	Christopher Bell	Kyle Busch Motorsports	Toyota	6
6	18	Noah Gragson (R)	Kyle Busch Motorsports	Toyota	5
7	21	Johnny Sauter	GMS Racing	Chevrolet	4
8	24	Justin Haley (R)	GMS Racing	Chevrolet	3
9	98	Grant Enfinger (R)	ThorSport Racing	Toyota	2
10	8	John Hunter Nemechek	NEMCO Motorsports	Chevrolet	1

Stage 3 Laps: 90

Fin	St	#	Driver	Team	Make	Laps	Led	Status	Pts
1	1	46	Kyle Busch (i)	Kyle Busch Motorsports	Toyota	203	109	running	0
2	6	88	Matt Crafton	ThorSport Racing	Toyota	203	90	running	52
3	14	8	John Hunter Nemechek	NEMCO Motorsports	Chevrolet	203	0	running	35
4	7	98	Grant Enfinger (R)	ThorSport Racing	Toyota	203	0	running	41
5	9	27	Ben Rhodes	ThorSport Racing	Toyota	203	1	running	43
6	3	21	Johnny Sauter	GMS Racing	Chevrolet	203	0	running	38
7	2	4	Christopher Bell	Kyle Busch Motorsports	Toyota	203	0	running	43
8	16	75	Parker Kligerman	Henderson Motorsports	Toyota	203	0	running	30
9	18	19	Austin Cindric (R)	Brad Keselowski Racing	Ford	203	3	running	36
10	5	99	Brandon Jones (i)	MDM Motorsports	Chevrolet	203	0	running	0
11	12	24	Justin Haley (R)	GMS Racing	Chevrolet	203	0	running	31
12	15	29	Chase Briscoe (R)	Brad Keselowski Racing	Ford	203	0	running	25
13	10	97	Jesse Little	JJL Motorsports	Toyota	202	0	running	24
14	19	92	Regan Smith	RBR Enterprises	Ford	202	0	running	23
15	4	18	Noah Gragson (R)	Kyle Busch Motorsports	Toyota	202	0	running	36
16	17	16	Ryan Truex	Hattori Racing Enterprises	Toyota	202	0	running	21
17	8	13	Cody Coughlin (R)	ThorSport Racing	Toyota	202	0	running	20
18	13	51	Harrison Burton	Kyle Busch Motorsports	Toyota	202	0	running	19
19	25	83	J. J. Yeley (i)	Copp Motorsports	Chevrolet	202	0	running	0
20	21	63	Landon Huffman	MB Motorsports	Chevrolet	201	0	running	17
21	26	45	T. J. Bell	Niece Motorsports	Chevrolet	200	0	running	16
22	22	02	Austin Hill	Young's Motorsports	Ford	199	0	running	15
23	28	49	Wendell Chavous (R)	Premium Motorsports	Chevrolet	196	0	running	14
24	27	44	Austin Wayne Self	Martins Motorsports	Chevrolet	194	0	parked	13
25	29	50	Josh Reaume	Beaver Motorsports	Chevrolet	186	0	running	12
26	23	68	Clay Greenfield	Clay Greenfield Motorsports	Chevrolet	183	0	running	11
27	32	1	Jordan Anderson	TJL Motorsports	Chevrolet	136	0	engine	10
28	11	33	Kaz Grala (R)	GMS Racing	Chevrolet	113	0	engine	9
29	20	52	Stewart Friesen (R)	Halmar Friesen Racing	Chevrolet	103	0	overheating	8
30	30	10	Jennifer Jo Cobb	Jennifer Jo Cobb Racing	Chevrolet	76	0	too slow	7
31	31	6	Norm Benning	Norm Benning Racing	Chevrolet	12	0	too slow	6
32	24	87	Joe Nemechek	NEMCO Motorsports	Chevrolet	3	0	vibration	5
Failed to qualify or withdrew
33		36	Chris Windom	MB Motorsports	Chevrolet				
34		57	Mike Senica	Norm Benning Racing	Chevrolet				
Official race results

== Standings after the race ==
Drivers' Championship standings

Pos	Driver	Points
1	Christopher Bell	615
2	Johnny Sauter	573 (-42)
3	Matt Crafton	562 (–53)
4	Chase Briscoe	534 (–81)
5	Ben Rhodes	469 (–146)
6	Ryan Truex	452 (–163)
7	Grant Enfinger	443 (–172)
8	John Hunter Nemechek	439 (–176)
Official driver's standings

- Note: Only the first 8 positions are included for the driver standings.

Previous race: 2017 LTi Printing 200	NASCAR Camping World Truck Series; 2017 season	Next race: 2017 Chevrolet Silverado 250
