= 2016 Drivin' for Linemen 200 =

9th race of the 2016 NASCAR Camping World Truck Series

Race details
- Race 9 of 23 of the 2016 NASCAR Camping World Truck Series
- Date: June 25, 2016
- Official name: 3rd Annual Drivin' for Linemen 200
- Location: Gateway Motorsports Park, Madison, Illinois
- Course: Permanent racing facility
- Course length: 1.25 miles (2.01 km)
- Distance: 160 laps, 200 mi (321 km)
- Scheduled distance: 160 laps, 200 mi (321 km)
- Average speed: 89.021 mph (143.265 km/h)

Pole position
Driver	Ben Rhodes	ThorSport Racing
- Grid positions set by competition-based formula

Most laps led
Driver	William Byron	Kyle Busch Motorsports
- Laps: 47

Winner
No. 4	Christopher Bell	Kyle Busch Motorsports

Television in the United States
- Network: FS1
- Announcers: Vince Welch, Phil Parsons, and Todd Bodine

Radio in the United States
- Radio: MRN

The 2016 Drivin' for Linemen 200 was the 9th stock car race of the 2016 NASCAR Camping World Truck Series, and the 16th iteration of the event. The race was held on Saturday, June 25, 2016, in Madison, Illinois, at Gateway Motorsports Park, a 1.25-mile (2.01 km) permanent tri-oval shaped racetrack. The race took the scheduled 160 laps to complete. In a wreck filled race, Christopher Bell, driving for Kyle Busch Motorsports, held off Ben Rhodes on the final restart, and earned his second career NASCAR Camping World Truck Series win, along with his first of the season. It was also the 50th NASCAR win for Kyle Busch Motorsports as an organization. To fill out the podium, Daniel Hemric, driving for Brad Keselowski Racing, would finish 3rd, respectively. But the race was most known for a fight between John Wes Townley and Spencer Gallagher. After the two crashed out of the race, the two had words when they climbed out of their trucks before Townley lunged at Gallagher and tackled him to the ground. The two got up and went to the ground again before they eventually got up again with announcer Vince Welch laughing. Townley then landed four punches on Gallagher before he tried to land a couple more but missed before either they go separated by the NASCAR Officials or Townley simply gave up, let go of Gallagher, and walked away. Soon, Townley and Gallagher's fight began trending and was called one of the funniest fights ever in sports. Townley was eventually fined $15,000 and placed on probation until the end of the year while Gallagher was fined $12,000 and also placed on probation at the end of the year

== Background ==
Gateway Motorsports Park is a motorsport racing facility in Madison, Illinois, just east of St. Louis, Missouri, United States, close to the Gateway Arch. It features a 1.250 mi (2.012 km) oval that hosts the NASCAR Cup Series, NASCAR Craftsman Truck Series, and the NTT INDYCAR SERIES, a 2.000-mile (3.219 km) infield road course used by SpeedTour TransAm, SCCA, and Porsche Club of America, a quarter-mile NHRA-sanctioned drag strip that hosts the annual NHRA Camping World Drag Racing Series Midwest Nationals event, and the Kartplex, a state-of-the-art karting facility.

=== Entry list ===
- (R) denotes rookie driver.
- (i) denotes driver who is ineligible for series driver points.

#	Driver	Team	Make	Sponsor
00	Cole Custer (R)	JR Motorsports	Chevrolet	Haas Automation
1	Jennifer Jo Cobb	Jennifer Jo Cobb Racing	Chevrolet	PitStopsForHope.org
02	Tyler Young	Young's Motorsports	Chevrolet	Randco, Young's Building Systems
4	Christopher Bell (R)	Kyle Busch Motorsports	Toyota	Toyota
05	John Wes Townley	Athenian Motorsports	Chevrolet	Jive Communications, Zaxby's
07	Shane Lee	Win-Tron Racing	Toyota	LeeBoy
8	John Hunter Nemechek	NEMCO Motorsports	Chevrolet	Fire Alarm Services
9	William Byron (R)	Kyle Busch Motorsports	Toyota	Liberty University
10	Caleb Roark	Jennifer Jo Cobb Racing	Chevrolet	Driven2Honor.org
11	Germán Quiroga	Red Horse Racing	Toyota	Red Horse Racing
13	Cameron Hayley	ThorSport Racing	Toyota	Cabinets by Hayley
17	Timothy Peters	Red Horse Racing	Toyota	Red Horse Racing
19	Daniel Hemric	Brad Keselowski Racing	Ford	DrawTite
21	Johnny Sauter	GMS Racing	Chevrolet	Alamo Rent a Car
22	Austin Wayne Self (R)	AM Racing	Toyota	AM Technical Solutions
23	Spencer Gallagher	GMS Racing	Chevrolet	Alamo Rent a Car
24	Kaz Grala	GMS Racing	Chevrolet	Allegiant Travel Company
29	Tyler Reddick	Brad Keselowski Racing	Ford	Cooper-Standard Automotive
32	Justin Haley	Braun Motorsports	Chevrolet	Braun Auto Group
33	Ben Kennedy	GMS Racing	Chevrolet	Wheelwell
41	Ben Rhodes (R)	ThorSport Racing	Toyota	Alpha Energy Solutions
44	Tommy Joe Martins	Martins Motorsports	Chevrolet	Diamond Gusset Jeans
49	Spencer Boyd	Premium Motorsports	Chevrolet	Wilkerson Automotive
50	Travis Kvapil	MAKE Motorsports	Chevrolet	Linewar, Elite Fleet Services, IBEW
51	Erik Jones (i)	Kyle Busch Motorsports	Toyota	Jegs High Performance, Auburn Gear
63	Jake Griffin	MB Motorsports	Chevrolet	Vatterott College, Mittler Bros.
66	Jordan Anderson	Bolen Motorsports	Chevrolet	Columbia SC - Famously Hot
71	Enrique Contreras III	Contreras Motorsports	Chevrolet	American Club
81	Ryan Truex	Hattori Racing Enterprises	Toyota	Aisin
86	Brandon Brown	Brandonbilt Motorsports	Chevrolet	CorvetteParts.net
88	Matt Crafton	ThorSport Racing	Toyota	Fisher Nuts, Menards
98	Rico Abreu (R)	ThorSport Racing	Toyota	Safelite, Curb Records
Official entry list

== Practice ==
=== First practice ===
The first practice session was held on Saturday, June 25, at 8:30 am CST, and would last for 55 minutes. Ben Rhodes, driving for ThorSport Racing, would set the fastest time in the session, with a lap of 33.152, and an average speed of 135.738 mph (218.449 km/h).

Pos.	#	Driver	Team	Make	Time	Speed
1	41	Ben Rhodes (R)	ThorSport Racing	Toyota	33.152	135.738
2	9	William Byron (R)	Kyle Busch Motorsports	Toyota	33.235	135.399
3	00	Cole Custer (R)	JR Motorsports	Chevrolet	33.535	134.188
Full first practice results

=== Final practice ===
The final practice session was held on Saturday, June 25, at 10:30 am CST, and would last for 1 hour and 25 minutes. Ben Rhodes, driving for ThorSport Racing, would once again set the fastest time in the session, with a lap of 33.148, and an average speed of 135.755 mph (218.476 km/h).

Pos.	#	Driver	Team	Make	Time	Speed
1	41	Ben Rhodes (R)	ThorSport Racing	Toyota	33.148	135.755
2	21	Johnny Sauter	GMS Racing	Chevrolet	33.208	135.510
3	8	John Hunter Nemechek	NEMCO Motorsports	Chevrolet	33.320	135.054
Full final practice results

== Qualifying ==
Qualifying was originally going to be held on Saturday, June 25, at 4:45 pm CST. Since Gateway Motorsports Park is under 1.5 miles (2.4 km) in length, the qualifying system was a multi-car system that included three rounds. The first round was 15 minutes, where every driver would be able to set a lap within the 15 minutes. Then, the second round would consist of the fastest 24 cars in Round 1, and drivers would have 10 minutes to set a lap. Round 3 consisted of the fastest 12 drivers from Round 2, and the drivers would have 5 minutes to set a time. Whoever was fastest in Round 3 would win the pole.

Qualifying was cancelled due to inclement weather. The starting lineup was determined by practice speeds. As a result, Ben Rhodes, driving for ThorSport Racing, would earn the pole. No drivers failed to qualify.

=== Starting lineup ===
Pos.	#	Driver	Team	Make
1	41	Ben Rhodes (R)	ThorSport Racing	Toyota
2	21	Johnny Sauter	GMS Racing	Chevrolet
3	9	William Byron (R)	Kyle Busch Motorsports	Toyota
4	8	John Hunter Nemechek	NEMCO Motorsports	Chevrolet
5	11	Germán Quiroga	Red Horse Racing	Toyota
6	81	Ryan Truex	Hattori Racing Enterprises	Toyota
7	29	Tyler Reddick	Brad Keselowski Racing	Ford
8	00	Cole Custer (R)	JR Motorsports	Chevrolet
9	4	Christopher Bell (R)	Kyle Busch Motorsports	Toyota
10	13	Cameron Hayley	ThorSport Racing	Toyota
11	23	Spencer Gallagher	GMS Racing	Chevrolet
12	33	Ben Kennedy	GMS Racing	Chevrolet
13	19	Daniel Hemric	Brad Keselowski Racing	Ford
14	88	Matt Crafton	ThorSport Racing	Toyota
15	32	Justin Haley	Braun Motorsports	Chevrolet
16	24	Kaz Grala	GMS Racing	Chevrolet
17	51	Erik Jones (i)	Kyle Busch Motorsports	Toyota
18	05	John Wes Townley	Athenian Motorsports	Chevrolet
19	02	Tyler Young	Young's Motorsports	Chevrolet
20	07	Shane Lee	Win-Tron Racing	Toyota
21	17	Timothy Peters	Red Horse Racing	Toyota
22	63	Jake Griffin	MB Motorsports	Chevrolet
23	98	Rico Abreu (R)	ThorSport Racing	Toyota
24	66	Jordan Anderson	Bolen Motorsports	Chevrolet
25	50	Travis Kvapil	MAKE Motorsports	Chevrolet
26	22	Austin Wayne Self (R)	AM Racing	Toyota
27	44	Tommy Joe Martins	Martins Motorsports	Chevrolet
Qualified by owner's points
28	49	Spencer Boyd	Premium Motorsports	Chevrolet
29	1	Jennifer Jo Cobb	Jennifer Jo Cobb Racing	Chevrolet
30	71	Enrique Contreras III	Contreras Motorsports	Chevrolet
31	86	Brandon Brown	Brandonbilt Motorsports	Chevrolet
32	10	Caleb Roark	Jennifer Jo Cobb Racing	Chevrolet
Official starting lineup

== Race results ==
Fin	St	#	Driver	Team	Make	Laps	Led	Status	Pts
1	9	4	Christopher Bell (R)	Kyle Busch Motorsports	Toyota	160	38	Running	36
2	1	41	Ben Rhodes (R)	ThorSport Racing	Toyota	160	4	Running	32
3	13	19	Daniel Hemric	Brad Keselowski Racing	Ford	160	0	Running	30
4	2	21	Johnny Sauter	GMS Racing	Chevrolet	160	29	Running	30
5	17	51	Erik Jones (i)	Kyle Busch Motorsports	Toyota	160	0	Running	0
6	4	8	John Hunter Nemechek	NEMCO Motorsports	Chevrolet	160	0	Running	27
7	5	11	Germán Quiroga	Red Horse Racing	Toyota	160	0	Running	26
8	16	24	Kaz Grala	GMS Racing	Chevrolet	160	0	Running	25
9	12	33	Ben Kennedy	GMS Racing	Chevrolet	160	0	Running	24
10	21	17	Timothy Peters	Red Horse Racing	Toyota	160	0	Running	23
11	24	66	Jordan Anderson	Bolen Motorsports	Chevrolet	160	1	Running	23
12	25	50	Travis Kvapil	MAKE Motorsports	Chevrolet	160	0	Running	21
13	19	02	Tyler Young	Young's Motorsports	Chevrolet	160	0	Running	20
14	23	98	Rico Abreu (R)	ThorSport Racing	Toyota	160	0	Running	19
15	8	00	Cole Custer (R)	JR Motorsports	Chevrolet	160	0	Running	18
16	20	07	Shane Lee	Win-Tron Racing	Toyota	160	0	Running	17
17	3	9	William Byron (R)	Kyle Busch Motorsports	Toyota	160	47	Running	18
18	27	44	Tommy Joe Martins	Martins Motorsports	Chevrolet	160	0	Running	15
19	28	49	Spencer Boyd	Premium Motorsports	Chevrolet	160	0	Running	14
20	30	71	Enrique Contreras III	Contreras Motorsports	Chevrolet	160	0	Running	13
21	15	32	Justin Haley	Braun Motorsports	Chevrolet	156	0	Running	12
22	11	23	Spencer Gallagher	GMS Racing	Chevrolet	153	0	Accident	11
23	18	05	John Wes Townley	Athenian Motorsports	Chevrolet	150	0	Accident	10
24	10	13	Cameron Hayley	ThorSport Racing	Toyota	150	0	Running	9
25	7	29	Tyler Reddick	Brad Keselowski Racing	Ford	149	41	Accident	9
26	6	81	Ryan Truex	Hattori Racing Enterprises	Toyota	149	0	Running	7
27	14	88	Matt Crafton	ThorSport Racing	Toyota	148	0	Accident	6
28	26	22	Austin Wayne Self (R)	AM Racing	Toyota	118	0	Accident	5
29	29	1	Jennifer Jo Cobb	Jennifer Jo Cobb Racing	Chevrolet	113	0	Accident	4
30	22	63	Jake Griffin	MB Motorsports	Chevrolet	14	0	Engine	3
31	32	10	Caleb Roark	Jennifer Jo Cobb Racing	Chevrolet	7	0	Vibration	2
32	31	86	Brandon Brown	Brandonbilt Motorsports	Chevrolet	0	0	Engine	1
Official race results

== Standings after the race ==
Drivers' Championship standings

	Pos	Driver	Points
1	1	William Byron	226
1	2	Matt Crafton	225 (−1)
	3	Timothy Peters	221 (−5)
	4	Daniel Hemric	216 (−10)
2	5	Johnny Sauter	204 (−22)
	6	John Hunter Nemechek	192 (−34)
1	7	Ben Kennedy	192 (−34)
3	8	Tyler Reddick	191 (−35)
Official driver's standings

- Note: Only the first 8 positions are included for the driver standings.

Previous race: 2016 Speediatrics 200	NASCAR Camping World Truck Series; 2016 season	Next race: 2016 Buckle Up in Your Truck 225
