= 2017 TheHouse.com 225 =

16th race of the 2017 NASCAR Camping World Truck Series

Race details
- Race 16 of 23 of the 2017 NASCAR Camping World Truck Series
- Date: September 15, 2017
- Official name: 9th Annual TheHouse.com 225
- Location: Joliet, Illinois, Chicagoland Speedway
- Course: Permanent racing facility
- Course length: 1.5 miles (2.41 km)
- Distance: 150 laps, 225 mi (362.102 km)
- Scheduled distance: 150 laps, 225 mi (362.102 km)
- Average speed: 123.25 miles per hour (198.35 km/h)

Most laps led
Driver	Christopher Bell	Kyle Busch Motorsports
- Laps: 72

Winner
No. 21	Johnny Sauter	GMS Racing

Television in the United States
- Network: Fox Sports 1
- Announcers: Vince Welch, Phil Parsons, Michael Waltrip

Radio in the United States
- Radio: Motor Racing Network

The 2017 TheHouse.com 225 was the 16th stock car race of the 2017 NASCAR Camping World Truck Series, the final race of the 2017 NASCAR Camping World Truck Series regular season, and the ninth iteration of the event. The race was held on Friday, September 15, 2017, in Joliet, Illinois, at Chicagoland Speedway, a 1.5 miles (2.4 km) permanent D-shaped oval. The race took the scheduled 150 laps to complete. At race's end, Johnny Sauter, driving for GMS Racing, would control the last 28 laps of the race to win his 15th career NASCAR Camping World Truck Series win and his second of the season. To fill out the podium, Chase Briscoe of Brad Keselowski Racing and Christopher Bell of Kyle Busch Motorsports would finish second and third, respectively.

The eight drivers to qualify for the NASCAR playoffs were Christopher Bell, Johnny Sauter, John Hunter Nemechek, Matt Crafton, Chase Briscoe, Austin Cindric, Ben Rhodes, and Kaz Grala.

== Background ==
The layout of Chicagoland Speedway, the venue where the race was held.

Chicagoland Speedway is a 1.5-mile (2.4 km) tri-oval speedway in Joliet, Illinois, southwest of Chicago. The speedway opened in 2001 and currently hosts NASCAR races. Until 2011, the speedway also hosted the IndyCar Series, recording numerous close finishes, including the closest finish in IndyCar history. The speedway is owned and operated by International Speedway Corporation and is located adjacent to Route 66 Raceway.

=== Entry list ===
- (R) denotes rookie driver.
- (i) denotes driver who is ineligible for series driver points.

#	Driver	Team	Make	Sponsor
0	Tommy Regan (i)	Jennifer Jo Cobb Racing	Chevrolet	Driven 2 Honor
1	Jordan Anderson	TJL Motorsports	Chevrolet	Lucas Oil, Bommarito Automotive Group
02	Tyler Young	Young's Motorsports	Chevrolet	Randco, Young's Building Systems
4	Christopher Bell	Kyle Busch Motorsports	Toyota	SiriusXM
6	Norm Benning	Norm Benning Racing	Chevrolet	Norm Benning Racing
8	John Hunter Nemechek	NEMCO Motorsports	Chevrolet	Fire Alarm Services, Teenage Mutant Ninja Turtles
10	Jennifer Jo Cobb	Jennifer Jo Cobb Racing	Chevrolet	Nickelodeon, Teenage Mutant Ninja Turtles
13	Cody Coughlin (R)	ThorSport Racing	Toyota	JEGS
14	Ted Minor	Long Motorsports	Chevrolet	Edge Guard
15	Gray Gaulding (i)	Premium Motorsports	Chevrolet	Premium Motorsports
16	Ryan Truex	Hattori Racing Enterprises	Toyota	Aisin
18	Noah Gragson (R)	Kyle Busch Motorsports	Toyota	Switch
19	Austin Cindric (R)	Brad Keselowski Racing	Ford	Reese Brands, DrawTite
21	Johnny Sauter	GMS Racing	Chevrolet	ISM Connect
24	Justin Haley (R)	GMS Racing	Chevrolet	Fraternal Order of Eagles
27	Ben Rhodes	ThorSport Racing	Toyota	Safelite Auto Glass
29	Chase Briscoe (R)	Brad Keselowski Racing	Ford	Cooper-Standard
33	Kaz Grala (R)	GMS Racing	Chevrolet	Stealth
36	B. J. McLeod (i)	MB Motorsports	Chevrolet	MB Motorsports
44	Austin Wayne Self	Martins Motorsports	Chevrolet	AM Technical Solutions, Don't Mess with Texas
45	Justin Fontaine	Niece Motorsports	Toyota	ProMatic Automation
49	Wendell Chavous (R)	Premium Motorsports	Chevrolet	Premium Motorsports
50	Josh Reaume	Beaver Motorsports	Chevrolet	WCI Parts
51	Myatt Snider	Kyle Busch Motorsports	Toyota	Louisiana Hot Sauce
57	Mike Senica	Norm Benning Racing	Chevrolet	Norm Benning Racing
63	Kevin Donahue	MB Motorsports	Chevrolet	Mittler Bros. Machine & Tool
74	Mike Harmon (i)	Mike Harmon Racing	Chevrolet	Mike Harmon Racing
83	Camden Murphy	Copp Motorsports	Chevrolet	Ronald McDonald House Charities Chicagoland & Northwest Indiana
87	Joe Nemechek	NEMCO Motorsports	Chevrolet	NEMCO Motorsports
88	Matt Crafton	ThorSport Racing	Toyota	Menards, Hormel Black Label Bacon
92	Regan Smith	RBR Enterprises	Ford	BTS Tire & Wheel Distributors, Advance Auto Parts
98	Grant Enfinger (R)	ThorSport Racing	Toyota	JIVE Communication
Official entry list

== Practice ==
=== First practice ===
The first practice session was held on Thursday, September 14, at 2:30 PM CST. The session would last for 55 minutes. Chase Briscoe of Brad Keselowski Racing would set the fastest time in the session, with a lap of 30.805 and an average speed of 175.296 miles per hour (282.112 km/h).

Pos.	#	Driver	Team	Make	Time	Speed
1	29	Chase Briscoe (R)	Brad Keselowski Racing	Ford	30.805	175.296
2	21	Johnny Sauter	GMS Racing	Chevrolet	30.823	175.194
3	4	Christopher Bell	Kyle Busch Motorsports	Toyota	30.971	174.357
Full first practice results

=== Second and final practice ===
The second and final practice session, sometimes referred to as Happy Hour, practice session was held on Thursday, September 14, at 4:30 PM CST. The session would last for 55 minutes. Johnny Sauter of GMS Racing would set the fastest time in the session, with a lap of 30.688 and an average speed of 175.965 miles per hour (283.188 km/h).

Pos.	#	Driver	Team	Make	Time	Speed
1	21	Johnny Sauter	GMS Racing	Chevrolet	30.688	175.965
2	29	Chase Briscoe (R)	Brad Keselowski Racing	Ford	30.850	175.041
3	18	Noah Gragson (R)	Kyle Busch Motorsports	Toyota	30.884	174.848
Full Happy Hour practice results

== Qualifying ==
Qualifying was held on Friday, September 15, at 4:05 PM CST. Since Chicagoland Speedway is at least 1.5 miles (2.4 km) in length, the qualifying system was a single car, single lap, two round system where in the first round, everyone would set a time to determine positions 13–32. Then, the fastest 12 qualifiers would move on to the second round to determine positions 1–12.

Ryan Truex of Hattori Racing Enterprises would win the pole, setting a lap of 30.685 and an average speed of 175.982 miles per hour (283.216 km/h) in the second round.

No drivers would fail to qualify.

=== Full qualifying results ===
Pos.	#	Driver	Team	Make	Time (R1)	Speed (R1)	Time (R2)	Speed (R2)
1	16	Ryan Truex	Hattori Racing Enterprises	Toyota	30.760	175.553	30.685	175.982
2	29	Chase Briscoe (R)	Brad Keselowski Racing	Ford	30.840	175.097	30.701	175.890
3	4	Christopher Bell	Kyle Busch Motorsports	Toyota	30.851	175.035	30.795	175.353
4	21	Johnny Sauter	GMS Racing	Chevrolet	30.853	175.023	30.821	175.205
5	88	Matt Crafton	ThorSport Racing	Toyota	30.958	174.430	30.943	174.514
6	18	Noah Gragson (R)	Kyle Busch Motorsports	Toyota	31.014	174.115	30.943	174.514
7	19	Austin Cindric (R)	Brad Keselowski Racing	Ford	30.955	174.447	30.954	174.452
8	98	Grant Enfinger (R)	ThorSport Racing	Toyota	31.048	173.924	30.955	174.447
9	24	Justin Haley (R)	GMS Racing	Chevrolet	30.970	174.362	30.976	174.329
10	51	Myatt Snider	Kyle Busch Motorsports	Toyota	30.965	174.390	30.989	174.255
11	13	Cody Coughlin (R)	ThorSport Racing	Toyota	31.093	173.673	31.064	173.835
12	8	John Hunter Nemechek	NEMCO Motorsports	Chevrolet	31.148	173.366	31.227	172.927
Eliminated in Round 1
13	27	Ben Rhodes	ThorSport Racing	Toyota	31.149	173.360	-	-
14	33	Kaz Grala (R)	GMS Racing	Chevrolet	31.155	173.327	-	-
15	02	Tyler Young	Young's Motorsports	Chevrolet	31.363	172.177	-	-
16	92	Regan Smith	RBR Enterprises	Ford	31.402	171.964	-	-
17	45	Justin Fontaine	Niece Motorsports	Toyota	31.713	170.277	-	-
18	44	Austin Wayne Self	Martins Motorsports	Chevrolet	31.870	169.438	-	-
19	15	Gray Gaulding (i)	Premium Motorsports	Chevrolet	32.167	167.874	-	-
20	87	Joe Nemechek	NEMCO Motorsports	Chevrolet	32.355	166.898	-	-
21	1	Jordan Anderson	TJL Motorsports	Chevrolet	32.376	166.790	-	-
22	83	Camden Murphy	Copp Motorsports	Chevrolet	32.461	166.353	-	-
23	49	Wendell Chavous (R)	Premium Motorsports	Chevrolet	32.813	164.569	-	-
24	63	Kevin Donahue	MB Motorsports	Chevrolet	32.921	164.029	-	-
25	50	Josh Reaume	Beaver Motorsports	Chevrolet	33.056	163.359	-	-
26	36	B. J. McLeod (i)	MB Motorsports	Chevrolet	33.423	161.565	-	-
27	14	Ted Minor	Long Motorsports	Chevrolet	33.927	159.165	-	-
Qualified by owner's points
28	74	Mike Harmon (i)	Mike Harmon Racing	Chevrolet	34.279	157.531	-	-
29	0	Tommy Regan (i)	Jennifer Jo Cobb Racing	Chevrolet	34.791	155.213	-	-
30	6	Norm Benning	Norm Benning Racing	Chevrolet	34.798	155.181	-	-
31	10	Jennifer Jo Cobb	Jennifer Jo Cobb Racing	Chevrolet	35.416	152.473	-	-
32	57	Mike Senica	Norm Benning Racing	Chevrolet	42.214	127.920	-	-
Official qualifying results
Official starting lineup

== Race results ==
Stage 1 Laps: 35

Pos.	#	Driver	Team	Make	Pts
1	16	Ryan Truex	Hattori Racing Enterprises	Toyota	10
2	21	Johnny Sauter	GMS Racing	Chevrolet	9
3	27	Ben Rhodes	ThorSport Racing	Toyota	8
4	8	John Hunter Nemechek	NEMCO Motorsports	Chevrolet	7
5	29	Chase Briscoe (R)	Brad Keselowski Racing	Ford	6
6	19	Austin Cindric (R)	Brad Keselowski Racing	Ford	5
7	88	Matt Crafton	ThorSport Racing	Toyota	4
8	4	Christopher Bell	Kyle Busch Motorsports	Toyota	3
9	92	Regan Smith	RBR Enterprises	Ford	2
10	18	Noah Gragson (R)	Kyle Busch Motorsports	Toyota	1

Stage 2 Laps: 35

Pos.	#	Driver	Team	Make	Pts
1	4	Christopher Bell	Kyle Busch Motorsports	Toyota	10
2	29	Chase Briscoe (R)	Brad Keselowski Racing	Ford	9
3	88	Matt Crafton	ThorSport Racing	Toyota	8
4	21	Johnny Sauter	GMS Racing	Chevrolet	7
5	19	Austin Cindric (R)	Brad Keselowski Racing	Ford	6
6	24	Justin Haley (R)	GMS Racing	Chevrolet	5
7	8	John Hunter Nemechek	NEMCO Motorsports	Chevrolet	4
8	16	Ryan Truex	Hattori Racing Enterprises	Toyota	3
9	51	Myatt Snider	Kyle Busch Motorsports	Toyota	2
10	18	Noah Gragson (R)	Kyle Busch Motorsports	Toyota	1

Stage 3 Laps: 80

Fin	St	#	Driver	Team	Make	Laps	Led	Status	Pts
1	4	21	Johnny Sauter	GMS Racing	Chevrolet	150	28	running	56
2	2	29	Chase Briscoe (R)	Brad Keselowski Racing	Ford	150	18	running	50
3	3	4	Christopher Bell	Kyle Busch Motorsports	Toyota	150	72	running	47
4	1	16	Ryan Truex	Hattori Racing Enterprises	Toyota	150	29	running	46
5	8	98	Grant Enfinger (R)	ThorSport Racing	Toyota	150	0	running	32
6	13	27	Ben Rhodes	ThorSport Racing	Toyota	150	0	running	39
7	12	8	John Hunter Nemechek	NEMCO Motorsports	Chevrolet	150	0	running	41
8	6	18	Noah Gragson (R)	Kyle Busch Motorsports	Toyota	150	0	running	31
9	14	33	Kaz Grala (R)	GMS Racing	Chevrolet	150	0	running	28
10	10	51	Myatt Snider	Kyle Busch Motorsports	Toyota	150	0	running	29
11	11	13	Cody Coughlin (R)	ThorSport Racing	Toyota	150	0	running	26
12	16	92	Regan Smith	RBR Enterprises	Ford	149	0	running	27
13	15	02	Tyler Young	Young's Motorsports	Chevrolet	149	0	running	24
14	9	24	Justin Haley (R)	GMS Racing	Chevrolet	149	2	running	28
15	7	19	Austin Cindric (R)	Brad Keselowski Racing	Ford	148	0	running	33
16	5	88	Matt Crafton	ThorSport Racing	Toyota	148	1	running	33
17	17	45	Justin Fontaine	Niece Motorsports	Toyota	148	0	running	20
18	23	49	Wendell Chavous (R)	Premium Motorsports	Chevrolet	144	0	running	19
19	25	50	Josh Reaume	Beaver Motorsports	Chevrolet	143	0	running	18
20	18	44	Austin Wayne Self	Martins Motorsports	Chevrolet	143	0	running	17
21	21	1	Jordan Anderson	TJL Motorsports	Chevrolet	133	0	clutch	16
22	22	83	Camden Murphy	Copp Motorsports	Chevrolet	102	0	suspension	15
23	30	6	Norm Benning	Norm Benning Racing	Chevrolet	101	0	transmission	14
24	31	10	Jennifer Jo Cobb	Jennifer Jo Cobb Racing	Chevrolet	27	0	suspension	13
25	19	15	Gray Gaulding (i)	Premium Motorsports	Chevrolet	25	0	fuel pump	0
26	27	14	Ted Minor	Long Motorsports	Chevrolet	23	0	engine	11
27	28	74	Mike Harmon (i)	Mike Harmon Racing	Chevrolet	12	0	transmission	0
28	29	0	Tommy Regan (i)	Jennifer Jo Cobb Racing	Chevrolet	11	0	engine	0
29	24	63	Kevin Donahue	MB Motorsports	Chevrolet	10	0	crash	8
30	26	36	B. J. McLeod (i)	MB Motorsports	Chevrolet	10	0	electrical	0
31	20	87	Joe Nemechek	NEMCO Motorsports	Chevrolet	7	0	vibration	6
32	32	57	Mike Senica	Norm Benning Racing	Chevrolet	0	0	rear gear	5
Official race results

== Standings after the race ==
Drivers' Championship standings

Pos	Driver	Points
1	Christopher Bell	2,040
2	Johnny Sauter	2,025 (-15)
3	John Hunter Nemechek	2,014 (–26)
4	Matt Crafton	2,014 (–26)
5	Chase Briscoe	2,009 (–31)
6	Austin Cindric	2,007 (–33)
7	Ben Rhodes	2,007 (–33)
8	Kaz Grala	2,005 (–35)
Official driver's standings

- Note: Only the first 8 positions are included for the driver standings.

Previous race: 2017 Chevrolet Silverado 250	NASCAR Camping World Truck Series; 2017 season	Next race: 2017 UNOH 175
