= Cooper-Standard Automotive =

Automotive parts supplier

- Traded as: NYSE: CPS
- Number of employees: 32,000 (2017)

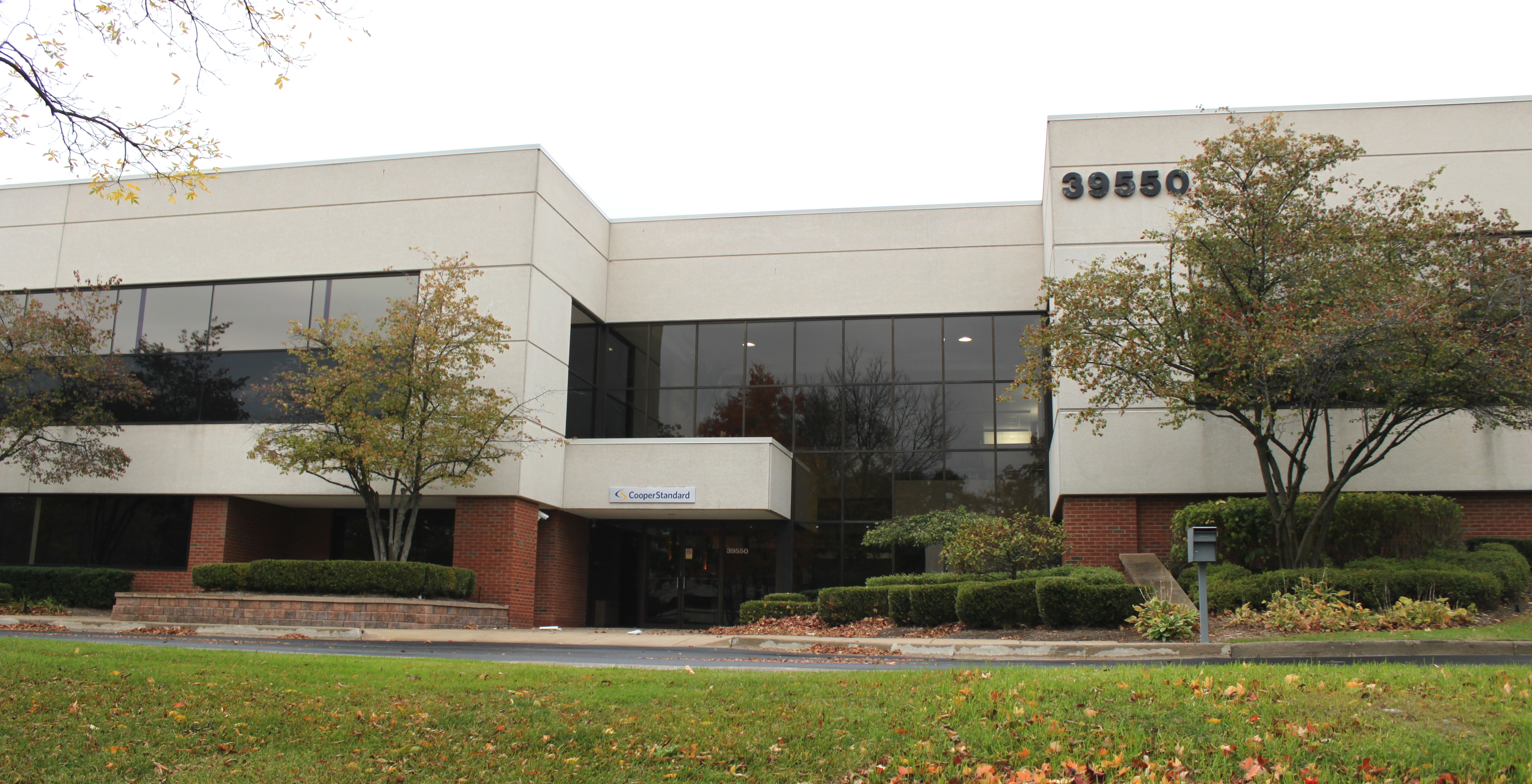
Cooper-Standard headquarters

Cooper Standard Automotive Inc., headquartered in Novi, Michigan, is a leading global supplier of systems and components for the automotive industry. Products include rubber and plastic sealing, fuel and brake lines, fluid transfer hoses and anti-vibration systems. Cooper Standard employs approximately 32,000 people globally and operates in 20 countries around the world. During World War II Standard Products produced 247,100 M1 Carbines, with the receiver of the carbines marked: "STD. PRO". They have manufacturing locations in New Lexington, OH, Surgoinsvile, TN and Stratford, Ontario, Canada, among 32 other manufacturing locations in North America and 107 manufacturing locations globally.

Cooper-Standard filed for Chapter 11 bankruptcy in 2009 but emerged from its case in May 2010 after eliminating $650 million in debt.
