= 2017 Eldora Dirt Derby =

11th race of the 2017 NASCAR Camping World Truck Series

2017 Eldora Dirt Derby 150
Race details
- Race 11 of 23 of the 2017 NASCAR Camping World Truck Series
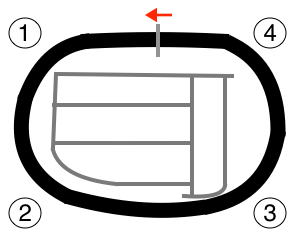
- Date: July 19, 2017
- Official name: 5th Annual Eldora Dirt Derby 150
- Location: Rossburg, Ohio, Eldora Speedway
- Course: Permanent racing facility
- Course length: 0.5 miles (0.80 km)
- Distance: 150 laps, 75 mi (120.701 km)
- Scheduled distance: 150 laps, 75 mi (120.701 km)
- Average speed: 42.56 miles per hour (68.49 km/h)

Pole position
Driver	Stewart Friesen	Halmar Friesen Racing
- Grid positions set by heat results

Most laps led
Driver	Stewart Friesen	Halmar Friesen Racing
- Laps: 93

Winner
No. 88	Matt Crafton	ThorSport Racing

Television in the United States
- Network: Fox Business Network
- Announcers: Vince Welch, Michael Waltrip, Kevin Harvick

Radio in the United States
- Radio: Motor Racing Network

The 2017 Eldora Dirt Derby 150 was the 11th stock car race of the 2017 NASCAR Camping World Truck Series and the fifth iteration of the event. The race was held on Wednesday, July 19, 2017, in Rossburg, Ohio at Eldora Speedway, a 0.500 miles (0.805 km) permanent oval dirt track. The race took the scheduled 150 laps to complete. At race's end, Matt Crafton, driving for ThorSport Racing, would take control of the race on the final restart with 18 laps to go to win his 14th careerNASCAR Camping World Truck Series win and his only win of the season. To fill out the podium, Stewart Friesen of Halmar Friesen Racing and Chase Briscoe of Brad Keselowski Racing would finish second and third, respectively.

== Background ==
Eldora Speedway (nicknamed "The Big E", "Auto Racing's Showcase Since 1954," and "The World's Greatest Dirt Track") is a 0.5 mi (804.672 m) high-banked clay dirt oval. Located north of Rossburg, Ohio in the village of New Weston, Ohio, it features permanent and festival-style seating believed to be in the range of 30,000. The 22,000 permanent grandstand and VIP suite seats make it the largest sports stadium in the Dayton, Ohio-region according to the Dayton Business Journal.

=== Entry list ===
- (R) denotes rookie driver.
- (i) denotes driver who is ineligible for series driver points.

#	Driver	Team	Make	Sponsor
0	Korbin Forrister	Jennifer Jo Cobb Racing	Chevrolet	Jennifer Jo Cobb Racing
1	Brandon Hightower	TJL Motorsports	Chevrolet	Timmons Truck Center, Premier Recycling, LLC
02	Max Johnston	Young's Motorsports	Chevrolet	Brandt Professional Agriculture
4	Christopher Bell	Kyle Busch Motorsports	Toyota	Toyota
6	Norm Benning	Norm Benning Racing	Chevrolet	Norm Benning Racing
8	John Hunter Nemechek	NEMCO Motorsports	Chevrolet	Fire Alarm Services
10	Ray Ciccarelli	Jennifer Jo Cobb Racing	Chevrolet	Driven 2 Honor, Stealth Belt
13	Cody Coughlin (R)	ThorSport Racing	Toyota	RIDE TV
16	Ryan Truex	Hattori Racing Enterprises	Toyota	Tacti
18	Noah Gragson (R)	Kyle Busch Motorsports	Toyota	Switch
19	Austin Cindric (R)	Brad Keselowski Racing	Ford	Fitzgerald Glider Kits
20	Sheldon Creed (i)	Young's Motorsports	Chevrolet	United Rentals
21	Johnny Sauter	GMS Racing	Chevrolet	Allegiant Air
24	Justin Haley (R)	GMS Racing	Chevrolet	Fraternal Order of Eagles
27	Ben Rhodes	ThorSport Racing	Toyota	Safelite Auto Glass
29	Chase Briscoe (R)	Brad Keselowski Racing	Ford	Cooper-Standard
33	Kaz Grala (R)	GMS Racing	Chevrolet	15-40 Connection
36	Chris Windom	MB Motorsports	Chevrolet	Baldwin Brothers Racing, Fox Paving
44	J. R. Heffner*	Martins Motorsports	Chevrolet	A. Colarusso & Son, Park East Sales
45	Jeffrey Abbey	Niece Motorsports	Chevrolet	Black Rifle Coffee Company
49	Wendell Chavous (R)	Premium Motorsports	Chevrolet	JAS Expedited Trucking
50	Mike Harmon (i)	Beaver Motorsports	Chevrolet	Lodestar Guidance
51	Harrison Burton	Kyle Busch Motorsports	Toyota	Hunt Brothers Pizza
52	Stewart Friesen (R)	Halmar Friesen Racing	Chevrolet	Halmar
57	Tommy Regan	Norm Benning Racing	Chevrolet	Norm Benning Racing
63	Bobby Pierce	MB Motorsports	Chevrolet	Gotta Race, Premier Waste Services
66	Ken Schrader	Bolen Motorsports	Chevrolet	K&L Ready Mix, Midwest Logistic Systems
75	Caleb Holman	Henderson Motorsports	Chevrolet	Food Country USA
80	Justin Shipley	Jacob Wallace Racing	Ford	Rogers Mechanical Contractors, Georgia Arms
83	J. J. Yeley (i)	Copp Motorsports	Chevrolet	Fr8Auctions
88	Matt Crafton	ThorSport Racing	Toyota	Menards, Ideal Door
89	Rico Abreu	ThorSport Racing	Toyota	Curb Records
98	Grant Enfinger (R)	ThorSport Racing	Toyota	Champion Power Equipment
99	Ty Dillon (i)	MDM Motorsports	Chevrolet	K&L Ready Mix
Official entry list

*Withdrew due to blowing an engine on their heat qualifying lap.

== Practice ==
=== First practice ===
The first practice session was held on Tuesday, July 18, at 7:00 p.m. EST, and would last for 55 minutes. Stewart Friesen of Halmar Friesen Racing would set the fastest time in the session, with a lap of 19.547 and an average speed of 92.086 miles per hour (148.198 km/h).

Pos.	#	Driver	Team	Make	Time	Speed
1	52	Stewart Friesen (R)	Halmar Friesen Racing	Chevrolet	19.547	92.086
2	99	Ty Dillon (i)	MDM Motorsports	Chevrolet	19.657	91.570
3	4	Christopher Bell	Kyle Busch Motorsports	Toyota	19.697	91.385
Full first practice results

=== Second and final practice ===
The second and final practice session, sometimes referred to as Happy Hour, was held on Tuesday, July 18, at 9:00 p.m. EST, and would last for 55 minutes. Caleb Holman of Henderson Motorsports would set the fastest time in the session, with a lap of 19.990 and an average speed of 90.045 miles per hour (144.913 km/h).

Pos.	#	Driver	Team	Make	Time	Speed
1	75	Caleb Holman	Henderson Motorsports	Chevrolet	19.990	90.045
2	4	Christopher Bell	Kyle Busch Motorsports	Toyota	20.177	89.211
3	99	Ty Dillon (i)	MDM Motorsports	Chevrolet	20.187	89.166
Full Happy Hour practice results

== Qualifying ==
Qualifying for the five heats took place on Wednesday, July 19, at 5:00 p.m. EST. Each driver would have two laps to set a fastest time; the fastest of the two would count as their official qualifying lap. Qualifying would set the grid positions for the heats; first would get first in heat one, second first in heat two, etc in a repeating order until the slowest car.

Stewart Friesen of Halmar Friesen Racing would win the overall heat qualifying pole, setting a time of 20.000 and an average speed of 90.000 miles per hour (144.841 km/h).

=== Time Trials ===
Pos.	#	Driver	Team	Make	Time	Speed
1	52	Stewart Friesen (R)	Halmar Friesen Racing	Chevrolet	20.000	90.000
2	29	Chase Briscoe (R)	Brad Keselowski Racing	Ford	20.138	89.383
3	33	Kaz Grala (R)	GMS Racing	Chevrolet	20.179	89.202
4	4	Christopher Bell	Kyle Busch Motorsports	Toyota	20.216	89.038
5	18	Noah Gragson (R)	Kyle Busch Motorsports	Toyota	20.240	88.933
6	80	Justin Shipley	Jacob Wallace Racing	Ford	20.354	88.435
7	88	Matt Crafton	ThorSport Racing	Toyota	20.373	88.352
8	16	Ryan Truex	Hattori Racing Enterprises	Toyota	20.412	88.183
9	75	Caleb Holman	Henderson Motorsports	Chevrolet	20.417	88.162
10	89	Rico Abreu	ThorSport Racing	Toyota	20.422	88.140
11	8	John Hunter Nemechek	NEMCO Motorsports	Chevrolet	20.424	88.132
12	27	Ben Rhodes	ThorSport Racing	Toyota	20.454	88.002
13	51	Harrison Burton	Kyle Busch Motorsports	Toyota	20.464	87.959
14	21	Johnny Sauter	GMS Racing	Chevrolet	20.473	87.921
15	36	Chris Windom	MB Motorsports	Chevrolet	20.476	87.908
16	45	Jeffrey Abbey	Niece Motorsports	Chevrolet	20.518	87.728
17	19	Austin Cindric (R)	Brad Keselowski Racing	Ford	20.545	87.613
18	24	Justin Haley (R)	GMS Racing	Chevrolet	20.567	87.519
19	20	Sheldon Creed (i)	Young's Motorsports	Chevrolet	20.595	87.400
20	99	Ty Dillon (i)	MDM Motorsports	Chevrolet	20.635	87.230
21	63	Bobby Pierce	MB Motorsports	Chevrolet	20.692	86.990
22	02	Max Johnston	Young's Motorsports	Chevrolet	20.786	86.597
23	10	Ray Ciccarelli	Jennifer Jo Cobb Racing	Chevrolet	20.979	85.800
24	66	Ken Schrader	Bolen Motorsports	Chevrolet	21.005	85.694
25	1	Brandon Hightower	TJL Motorsports	Chevrolet	21.039	85.555
26	98	Grant Enfinger (R)	ThorSport Racing	Toyota	21.109	85.272
27	49	Wendell Chavous (R)	Premium Motorsports	Chevrolet	21.264	84.650
28	83	J. J. Yeley (i)	Copp Motorsports	Chevrolet	21.301	84.503
29	0	Korbin Forrister	Jennifer Jo Cobb Racing	Chevrolet	21.371	84.226
30	50	Mike Harmon (i)	Beaver Motorsports	Chevrolet	21.574	83.434
31	6	Norm Benning	Norm Benning Racing	Chevrolet	22.069	81.562
32	13	Cody Coughlin (R)	ThorSport Racing	Toyota	22.131	81.334
33	57	Tommy Regan	Norm Benning Racing	Chevrolet	24.096	74.701
34	44	J. R. Heffner	Martins Motorsports	Chevrolet	-	-
Official heat qualifying results

=== Heat #1 ===
Fin.	St.	#	Driver	Team	Make	Laps	Led	Status
1	1	52	Stewart Friesen (R)	Halmar Friesen Racing	Chevrolet	10	10	running
2	3	8	John Hunter Nemechek	NEMCO Motorsports	Chevrolet	10	0	running
3	6	98	Grant Enfinger (R)	ThorSport Racing	Toyota	10	0	running
4	4	45	Jeffrey Abbey	Niece Motorsports	Chevrolet	10	0	running
5	2	80	Justin Shipley	Jacob Wallace Racing	Ford	10	0	running
6	5	63	Bobby Pierce	MB Motorsports	Chevrolet	10	0	running
7	7	6	Norm Benning	Norm Benning Racing	Chevrolet	5	0	running
Official heat 1 results

=== Heat #2 ===
Fin.	St.	#	Driver	Team	Make	Laps	Led	Status
1	2	88	Matt Crafton	ThorSport Racing	Toyota	10	2	running
2	3	27	Ben Rhodes	ThorSport Racing	Toyota	10	0	running
3	1	29	Chase Briscoe (R)	Brad Keselowski Racing	Ford	10	8	running
4	4	19	Austin Cindric (R)	Brad Keselowski Racing	Ford	10	0	running
5	5	02	Max Johnston	Young's Motorsports	Chevrolet	10	0	running
6	7	13	Cody Coughlin (R)	ThorSport Racing	Toyota	10	0	running
7	6	49	Wendell Chavous (R)	Premium Motorsports	Chevrolet	10	0	running
Official heat 2 results

=== Heat #3 ===
Fin.	St.	#	Driver	Team	Make	Laps	Led	Status
1	1	33	Kaz Grala (R)	GMS Racing	Chevrolet	10	10	running
2	2	16	Ryan Truex	Hattori Racing Enterprises	Toyota	10	0	running
3	4	24	Justin Haley (R)	GMS Racing	Chevrolet	10	0	running
4	6	83	J. J. Yeley (i)	Copp Motorsports	Chevrolet	10	0	running
5	3	51	Harrison Burton	Kyle Busch Motorsports	Toyota	10	0	running
6	5	10	Ray Ciccarelli	Jennifer Jo Cobb Racing	Chevrolet	10	0	running
7	7	57	Tommy Regan	Norm Benning Racing	Chevrolet	2	0	mechanical
Official heat 3 results

=== Heat #4 ===
Fin.	St.	#	Driver	Team	Make	Laps	Led	Status
1	1	4	Christopher Bell	Kyle Busch Motorsports	Toyota	10	10	running
2	2	75	Caleb Holman	Henderson Motorsports	Chevrolet	10	0	running
3	3	21	Johnny Sauter	GMS Racing	Chevrolet	10	0	running
4	4	20	Sheldon Creed (i)	Young's Motorsports	Chevrolet	10	0	running
5	5	66	Ken Schrader	Bolen Motorsports	Chevrolet	10	0	running
6	6	0	Korbin Forrister	Jennifer Jo Cobb Racing	Chevrolet	4	0	window net
Official heat 4 results

=== Heat #5 ===
Fin.	St.	#	Driver	Team	Make	Laps	Led	Status
1	4	99	Ty Dillon (i)	MDM Motorsports	Chevrolet	10	9	running
2	1	18	Noah Gragson (R)	Kyle Busch Motorsports	Toyota	10	1	running
3	2	89	Rico Abreu	ThorSport Racing	Toyota	10	0	running
4	3	36	Chris Windom	MB Motorsports	Chevrolet	10	0	running
5	5	1	Brandon Hightower	TJL Motorsports	Chevrolet	10	0	running
6	6	50	Mike Harmon (i)	Beaver Motorsports	Chevrolet	0	0	did not start
Official heat 5 results

=== Last Chance Qualifier ===
The Last Chance Qualifier was held Wednesday, July 19, at 8:45 p.m. EST. The race was held for all other drivers that were not guaranteed a starting spot in the main feature, with the top seven drivers in the event qualifying to the main feature, leaving one driver to not qualify. Bobby Pierce would win the Last Chance Qualifier and take the 26th spot. At race's end, Tommy Regan, retiring after two laps due to handling issues, would be the only driver to fail to qualify.

Fin.	St.	#	Driver	Team	Make	Laps	Led	Status
1	1	63	Bobby Pierce	MB Motorsports	Chevrolet	15	4	running
2	2	13	Cody Coughlin (R)	ThorSport Racing	Toyota	15	11	running
3	7	49	Wendell Chavous (R)	Premium Motorsports	Chevrolet	15	0	running
4	4	6	Norm Benning	Norm Benning Racing	Chevrolet	15	0	running
5	6	0	Korbin Forrister	Jennifer Jo Cobb Racing	Chevrolet	15	0	running
6	5	50	Mike Harmon (i)	Beaver Motorsports	Chevrolet	15	0	running
7	3	10	Ray Ciccarelli	Jennifer Jo Cobb Racing	Chevrolet	13	0	running
8	8	57	Tommy Regan	Norm Benning Racing	Chevrolet	2	0	handling
Official Last Chance Qualifier results

=== Full starting lineup ===
Pos.	#	Driver	Team	Make
1	52	Stewart Friesen (R)	Halmar Friesen Racing	Chevrolet
2	88	Matt Crafton	ThorSport Racing	Toyota
3	33	Kaz Grala (R)	GMS Racing	Chevrolet
4	4	Christopher Bell	Kyle Busch Motorsports	Toyota
5	99	Ty Dillon (i)	MDM Motorsports	Chevrolet
6	8	John Hunter Nemechek	NEMCO Motorsports	Chevrolet
7	27	Ben Rhodes	ThorSport Racing	Toyota
8	16	Ryan Truex	Hattori Racing Enterprises	Toyota
9	75	Caleb Holman	Henderson Motorsports	Chevrolet
10	18	Noah Gragson (R)	Kyle Busch Motorsports	Toyota
11	98	Grant Enfinger (R)	ThorSport Racing	Toyota
12	29	Chase Briscoe (R)	Brad Keselowski Racing	Ford
13	24	Justin Haley (R)	GMS Racing	Chevrolet
14	21	Johnny Sauter	GMS Racing	Chevrolet
15	89	Rico Abreu	ThorSport Racing	Toyota
16	45	Jeffrey Abbey	Niece Motorsports	Chevrolet
17	19	Austin Cindric (R)	Brad Keselowski Racing	Ford
18	83	J. J. Yeley (i)	Copp Motorsports	Chevrolet
19	20	Sheldon Creed (i)	Young's Motorsports	Chevrolet
20	36	Chris Windom	MB Motorsports	Chevrolet
21	80	Justin Shipley	Jacob Wallace Racing	Ford
22	02	Max Johnston	Young's Motorsports	Chevrolet
23	51	Harrison Burton	Kyle Busch Motorsports	Toyota
24	66	Ken Schrader	Bolen Motorsports	Chevrolet
25	1	Brandon Hightower	TJL Motorsports	Chevrolet
26	63	Bobby Pierce	MB Motorsports	Chevrolet
27	13	Cody Coughlin (R)	ThorSport Racing	Toyota
28	49	Wendell Chavous (R)	Premium Motorsports	Chevrolet
29	6	Norm Benning	Norm Benning Racing	Chevrolet
30	0	Korbin Forrister	Jennifer Jo Cobb Racing	Chevrolet
31	50	Mike Harmon (i)	Beaver Motorsports	Chevrolet
32	10	Ray Ciccarelli	Jennifer Jo Cobb Racing	Chevrolet
Failed to qualify or withdrew
33	57	Tommy Regan	Norm Benning Racing	Chevrolet
WD	44	J. R. Heffner	Martins Motorsports	Chevrolet
Official starting lineup

== Race results ==
Stage 1 Laps: 40

Pos.	#	Driver	Team	Make	Pts
1	88	Matt Crafton	ThorSport Racing	Toyota	10
2	52	Stewart Friesen (R)	Halmar Friesen Racing	Chevrolet	9
3	8	John Hunter Nemechek	NEMCO Motorsports	Chevrolet	8
4	29	Chase Briscoe (R)	Brad Keselowski Racing	Ford	7
5	99	Ty Dillon (i)	MDM Motorsports	Chevrolet	0
6	19	Austin Cindric (R)	Brad Keselowski Racing	Ford	5
7	16	Ryan Truex	Hattori Racing Enterprises	Toyota	4
8	24	Justin Haley (R)	GMS Racing	Chevrolet	3
9	98	Grant Enfinger (R)	ThorSport Racing	Toyota	2
10	80	Justin Shipley	Jacob Wallace Racing	Ford	1

Stage 2 Laps: 50

Pos.	#	Driver	Team	Make	Pts
1	52	Stewart Friesen (R)	Halmar Friesen Racing	Chevrolet	10
2	99	Ty Dillon (i)	MDM Motorsports	Chevrolet	0
3	8	John Hunter Nemechek	NEMCO Motorsports	Chevrolet	8
4	4	Christopher Bell	Kyle Busch Motorsports	Toyota	7
5	19	Austin Cindric (R)	Brad Keselowski Racing	Ford	6
6	98	Grant Enfinger (R)	ThorSport Racing	Toyota	5
7	80	Justin Shipley	Jacob Wallace Racing	Ford	4
8	89	Rico Abreu	ThorSport Racing	Toyota	3
9	88	Matt Crafton	ThorSport Racing	Toyota	2
10	24	Justin Haley (R)	GMS Racing	Chevrolet	1

Stage 3 Laps: 60

Fin	St	#	Driver	Team	Make	Laps	Led	Status	Pts
1	2	88	Matt Crafton	ThorSport Racing	Toyota	150	24	running	52
2	1	52	Stewart Friesen (R)	Halmar Friesen Racing	Chevrolet	150	93	running	54
3	12	29	Chase Briscoe (R)	Brad Keselowski Racing	Ford	150	0	running	41
4	11	98	Grant Enfinger (R)	ThorSport Racing	Toyota	150	0	running	40
5	6	8	John Hunter Nemechek	NEMCO Motorsports	Chevrolet	150	11	running	48
6	26	63	Bobby Pierce	MB Motorsports	Chevrolet	150	0	running	31
7	10	18	Noah Gragson (R)	Kyle Busch Motorsports	Toyota	150	0	running	30
8	13	24	Justin Haley (R)	GMS Racing	Chevrolet	150	0	running	33
9	4	4	Christopher Bell	Kyle Busch Motorsports	Toyota	150	22	running	35
10	17	19	Austin Cindric (R)	Brad Keselowski Racing	Ford	150	0	running	38
11	27	13	Cody Coughlin (R)	ThorSport Racing	Toyota	150	0	running	26
12	5	99	Ty Dillon (i)	MDM Motorsports	Chevrolet	150	0	running	0
13	29	6	Norm Benning	Norm Benning Racing	Chevrolet	150	0	running	24
14	16	45	Jeffrey Abbey	Niece Motorsports	Chevrolet	150	0	running	23
15	23	51	Harrison Burton	Kyle Busch Motorsports	Toyota	150	0	running	22
16	28	49	Wendell Chavous (R)	Premium Motorsports	Chevrolet	149	0	running	21
17	24	66	Ken Schrader	Bolen Motorsports	Chevrolet	149	0	running	20
18	31	50	Mike Harmon (i)	Beaver Motorsports	Chevrolet	147	0	running	0
19	20	36	Chris Windom	MB Motorsports	Chevrolet	146	0	running	18
20	8	16	Ryan Truex	Hattori Racing Enterprises	Toyota	146	0	running	21
21	18	83	J. J. Yeley (i)	Copp Motorsports	Chevrolet	146	0	running	0
22	32	10	Ray Ciccarelli	Jennifer Jo Cobb Racing	Chevrolet	146	0	running	15
23	14	21	Johnny Sauter	GMS Racing	Chevrolet	143	0	running	14
24	25	1	Brandon Hightower	TJL Motorsports	Chevrolet	138	0	running	13
25	21	80	Justin Shipley	Jacob Wallace Racing	Ford	121	0	engine	17
26	15	89	Rico Abreu	ThorSport Racing	Toyota	117	0	crash	14
27	19	20	Sheldon Creed (i)	Young's Motorsports	Chevrolet	80	0	overheating	0
28	30	0	Korbin Forrister	Jennifer Jo Cobb Racing	Chevrolet	44	0	crash	9
29	22	02	Max Johnston	Young's Motorsports	Chevrolet	41	0	crash	8
30	7	27	Ben Rhodes	ThorSport Racing	Toyota	40	0	crash	7
31	3	33	Kaz Grala (R)	GMS Racing	Chevrolet	34	0	crash	6
32	9	75	Caleb Holman	Henderson Motorsports	Chevrolet	12	0	transmission	5
Failed to qualify or withdrew
33		57	Tommy Regan	Norm Benning Racing	Chevrolet				
WD		44	J. R. Heffner	Martins Motorsports	Chevrolet				
Official race results

== Standings after the race ==
Drivers' Championship standings

Pos	Driver	Points
1	Johnny Sauter	478
2	Christopher Bell	471 (-7)
3	Chase Briscoe	431 (–47)
4	Matt Crafton	427 (–51)
5	Grant Enfinger	356 (–122)
6	John Hunter Nemechek	354 (–124)
7	Ben Rhodes	337 (–141)
8	Ryan Truex	336 (–142)
Official driver's standings

- Note: Only the first 8 positions are included for the driver standings.

Previous race: 2017 Buckle Up in Your Truck 225	NASCAR Camping World Truck Series; 2017 season	Next race: 2017 Overton's 150
