= 2016 Aspen Dental Eldora Dirt Derby =

11th race of the 2016 NASCAR Camping World Truck Series

Race details
- Race 11 of 23 of the 2016 NASCAR Camping World Truck Series
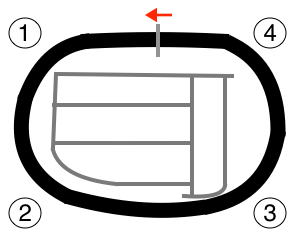
- Date: July 20, 2016
- Official name: 4th Annual Aspen Dental Eldora Dirt Derby
- Location: Eldora Speedway, Rossburg, Ohio
- Course: Permanent racing facility
- Course length: 0.5 miles (0.80 km)
- Distance: 150 laps, 75 mi (120 km)
- Scheduled distance: 150 laps, 75 mi (120 km)
- Average speed: 41.971 mph (67.546 km/h)

Pole position
Driver	Bobby Pierce	MB Motorsports
- Grid positions set by heat results

Most laps led
Driver	Bobby Pierce	MB Motorsports
- Laps: 102

Winner
No. 24	Kyle Larson	GMS Racing

Television in the United States
- Network: FS1
- Announcers: Vince Welch, Phil Parsons, and Michael Waltrip

Radio in the United States
- Radio: MRN

The 2016 Aspen Dental Eldora Dirt Derby was the 11th stock car race of the 2016 NASCAR Camping World Truck Series, and the 4th iteration of the event. The race was held on Wednesday, July 20, 2016, in Rossburg, Ohio at Eldora Speedway, a 0.5-mile (0.80 km) permanent oval shaped dirt track. The race took the scheduled 150 laps to complete. Kyle Larson, driving for GMS Racing, held off Christopher Bell with 16 laps to go, and earned his second NASCAR Camping World Truck Series win, and his first of the season. Bobby Pierce would dominate the entire race, leading 102 laps until hitting the wall and blowing a tire with 25 laps to go.

== Background ==
Eldora Speedway (nicknamed "The Big E", "Auto Racing's Showcase Since 1954," and "The World's Greatest Dirt Track") is a 0.5 mi (804.672 m) high-banked clay dirt oval. Located north of Rossburg, Ohio in the village of New Weston, Ohio, it features permanent and festival-style seating believed to be in the range of 30,000. The 22,000 permanent grandstand and VIP suite seats make it the largest sports stadium in the Dayton, Ohio-region according to the Dayton Business Journal.

=== Entry list ===
- (R) denotes rookie driver.
- (i) denotes driver who is ineligible for series driver points.

#	Driver	Team	Make	Sponsor
00	Cole Custer (R)	JR Motorsports	Chevrolet	OneMain Financial
1	Jennifer Jo Cobb	Jennifer Jo Cobb Racing	Chevrolet	Driven2Honor.org
02	Tyler Young	Young's Motorsports	Chevrolet	Randco, Young's Building Systems
4	Christopher Bell (R)	Kyle Busch Motorsports	Toyota	JBL
05	Brady Boswell	Athenian Motorsports	Chevrolet	Zaxby's
6	Norm Benning	Norm Benning Racing	Chevrolet	Churchill Trucking
07	Sheldon Creed	SS-Green Light Racing	Chevrolet	Safecraft
8	John Hunter Nemechek	NEMCO Motorsports	Chevrolet	Berry's Bullets
9	William Byron (R)	Kyle Busch Motorsports	Toyota	Liberty University
10	Caleb Roark	Jennifer Jo Cobb Racing	Chevrolet	Driven2Honor.org
11	Jake Griffin	Red Horse Racing	Toyota	Red Horse Racing
13	Cameron Hayley	ThorSport Racing	Toyota	Cabinets by Hayley
16	Stewart Friesen	Halmar Racing	Chevrolet	Halmar International
17	Timothy Peters	Red Horse Racing	Toyota	Red Horse Racing
19	Daniel Hemric	Brad Keselowski Racing	Ford	DrawTite
21	Johnny Sauter	GMS Racing	Chevrolet	Alamo Rent a Car
22	Austin Wayne Self (R)	AM Racing	Toyota	AM Technical Solutions
23	Spencer Gallagher	GMS Racing	Chevrolet	Allegiant Travel Company
24	Kyle Larson (i)	GMS Racing	Chevrolet	DC Solar
29	Tyler Reddick	Brad Keselowski Racing	Ford	Cooper-Standard Automotive
33	Ben Kennedy	GMS Racing	Chevrolet	wheelwell
41	Ben Rhodes (R)	ThorSport Racing	Toyota	Alpha Energy Solutions
43	Korbin Forrister	Empire Racing	Ford	Tilted Kilt, Petty's Garage
44	J. R. Heffner	Martins Motorsports	Chevrolet	Park East Sales, A. Colarusso
49	Wayne Edwards	Premium Motorsports	Chevrolet	OH! Lottery
50	Travis Kvapil	MAKE Motorsports	Chevrolet	CorvetteParts.net
51	Cody Coughlin (R)	Kyle Busch Motorsports	Toyota	Jegs High Performance
63	Bobby Pierce	MB Motorsports	Chevrolet	Premier Waste, Allgayer Inc.
66	Jordan Anderson	Bolen Motorsports	Chevrolet	FK Rod Ends, Columbia SC
71	Ken Schrader	Contreras Motorsports	Toyota	Hunt Brothers Pizza
75	Caleb Holman	Henderson Motorsports	Chevrolet	Food Country USA
78	Chris Fontaine	Glenden Enterprises	Toyota	Glenden Enterprises
80	Justin Shipley	Jacob Wallace Racing	Ford	Rogers Mechanical
82	Sean Corr	Empire Racing	Chevrolet	NESCO, Petty's Garage
86	Brandon Brown	Brandonbilt Motorsports	Chevrolet	ABS Van Rentals
88	Matt Crafton	ThorSport Racing	Toyota	Chi-Chi's, Menards
98	Rico Abreu (R)	ThorSport Racing	Toyota	Safelite, Curb Records
Official entry list

== Practice ==
=== First practice ===
The first practice session was held on Tuesday, July 19, at 6:30 pm EST, and would last for 1 hour and 25 minutes. Tyler Reddick, driving for Brad Keselowski Racing, would set the fastest time in the session, with a lap of 20.977, and an average speed of 85.808 mph (138.095 km/h).

Pos.	#	Driver	Team	Make	Time	Speed
1	29	Tyler Reddick	Brad Keselowski Racing	Ford	20.977	85.808
2	24	Kyle Larson (i)	GMS Racing	Chevrolet	20.979	85.800
3	4	Christopher Bell (R)	Kyle Busch Motorsports	Toyota	21.161	85.062
Full first practice results

=== Final practice ===
The final practice session was held on Tuesday, July 19, at 9:00 pm EST, and would last for about 55 minutes. Christopher Bell, driving for Kyle Busch Motorsports, would set the fastest time in the session, with a lap of 21.853, and an average speed of 82.369 mph (132.560 km/h).

Pos.	#	Driver	Team	Make	Time	Speed
1	4	Christopher Bell (R)	Kyle Busch Motorsports	Toyota	21.853	82.369
2	13	Cameron Hayley	ThorSport Racing	Toyota	21.980	81.893
3	98	Rico Abreu (R)	ThorSport Racing	Toyota	22.036	81.685
Full final practice results

== Heat qualifying ==
Qualifying for the heat races were held on Wednesday, July 20, at 5:15 pm EST. Each driver would have one lap to set a fastest time; in which that lap would count as their official qualifying lap. Qualifying would set the grid positions for the five heat races; first would get first in heat one, second first in heat two, etc. in a repeating order until the slowest car.

Caleb Holman, driving for Henderson Motorsports, would score the overall heat qualifying pole, with a lap of 20.711, and an average speed of 86.659 mph (139.464 km/h).

=== Full qualifying results ===
Pos.	#	Driver	Team	Make	Time	Speed
1	75	Caleb Holman	Henderson Motorsports	Chevrolet	20.771	86.659
2	29	Tyler Reddick	Brad Keselowski Racing	Ford	20.881	86.203
3	71	Ken Schrader	Contreras Motorsports	Toyota	20.925	86.022
4	44	J. R. Heffner	Martins Motorsports	Chevrolet	20.944	85.944
5	41	Ben Rhodes (R)	ThorSport Racing	Toyota	20.959	85.882
6	11	Jake Griffin	Red Horse Racing	Toyota	21.132	85.179
7	16	Stewart Friesen	Halmar Racing	Chevrolet	21.189	84.950
8	98	Rico Abreu (R)	ThorSport Racing	Toyota	21.190	84.946
9	86	Brandon Brown	Brandonbilt Motorsports	Chevrolet	21.226	84.802
10	4	Christopher Bell (R)	Kyle Busch Motorsports	Toyota	21.292	84.539
11	8	John Hunter Nemechek	NEMCO Motorsports	Chevrolet	21.326	84.404
12	24	Kyle Larson (i)	GMS Racing	Chevrolet	21.353	84.297
13	21	Johnny Sauter	GMS Racing	Chevrolet	21.383	84.179
14	02	Tyler Young	Young's Motorsports	Chevrolet	21.526	83.620
15	07	Sheldon Creed	SS-Green Light Racing	Chevrolet	21.557	83.500
16	63	Bobby Pierce	MB Motorsports	Chevrolet	21.663	83.091
17	43	Korbin Forrister	Empire Racing	Ford	21.700	82.949
18	00	Cole Custer (R)	JR Motorsports	Chevrolet	21.704	82.934
19	23	Spencer Gallagher	GMS Racing	Chevrolet	21.757	82.732
20	19	Daniel Hemric	Brad Keselowski Racing	Ford	21.842	82.410
21	10	Caleb Roark	Jennifer Jo Cobb Racing	Chevrolet	21.859	82.346
22	22	Austin Wayne Self (R)	AM Racing	Toyota	21.938	82.049
23	80	Justin Shipley	Jacob Wallace Racing	Ford	22.080	81.522
24	78	Chris Fontaine	Glenden Enterprises	Toyota	22.184	81.140
25	1	Jennifer Jo Cobb	Jennifer Jo Cobb Racing	Chevrolet	22.257	80.873
26	66	Jordan Anderson	Bolen Motorsports	Chevrolet	22.263	80.852
27	88	Matt Crafton	ThorSport Racing	Toyota	22.323	80.634
28	50	Travis Kvapil	MAKE Motorsports	Chevrolet	22.387	80.404
29	6	Norm Benning	Norm Benning Racing	Chevrolet	22.475	80.089
30	13	Cameron Hayley	ThorSport Racing	Toyota	22.479	80.075
31	05	Brady Boswell	Athenian Motorsports	Chevrolet	22.491	80.032
32	51	Cody Coughlin (R)	Kyle Busch Motorsports	Toyota	22.495	80.018
33	9	William Byron (R)	Kyle Busch Motorsports	Toyota	22.535	79.876
34	17	Timothy Peters	Red Horse Racing	Toyota	22.705	79.278
35	82	Sean Corr	Empire Racing	Chevrolet	22.758	79.093
36	49	Wayne Edwards	Premium Motorsports	Chevrolet	23.070	78.023
37	33	Ben Kennedy	GMS Racing	Chevrolet	23.247	77.429
Official qualifying results

=== Heat #1 ===
Fin.	St.	#	Driver	Team	Make	Laps	Led	Status
1	4	63	Bobby Pierce	MB Motorsports	Chevrolet	10	9	Running
2	1	75	Caleb Holman	Henderson Motorsports	Chevrolet	10	1	Running
3	2	11	Jake Griffin	Red Horse Racing	Toyota	10	0	Running
4	7	05	Brady Boswell	Athenian Motorsports	Chevrolet	10	0	Running
5	3	8	John Hunter Nemechek	NEMCO Motorsports	Chevrolet	10	0	Running
6	8	49	Wayne Edwards	Premium Motorsports	Chevrolet	10	0	Running
7	6	66	Jordan Anderson	Bolen Motorsports	Chevrolet	10	0	Running
8	5	10	Caleb Roark	Jennifer Jo Cobb Racing	Chevrolet	0	0	DNS
Official heat 1 results

=== Heat #2 ===
Fin.	St.	#	Driver	Team	Make	Laps	Led	Status
1	1	29	Tyler Reddick	Brad Keselowski Racing	Ford	10	10	Running
2	3	24	Kyle Larson (i)	GMS Racing	Chevrolet	10	0	Running
3	2	16	Stewart Friesen	Halmar Racing	Chevrolet	10	0	Running
4	8	33	Ben Kennedy	GMS Racing	Chevrolet	10	0	Running
5	6	88	Matt Crafton	ThorSport Racing	Toyota	10	0	Running
6	5	22	Austin Wayne Self (R)	AM Racing	Toyota	10	0	Running
7	4	43	Korbin Forrister	Empire Racing	Ford	10	0	Running
8	7	51	Cody Coughlin (R)	Kyle Busch Motorsports	Toyota	10	0	Running
Official heat 2 results

=== Heat #3 ===
Fin.	St.	#	Driver	Team	Make	Laps	Led	Status
1	1	71	Ken Schrader	Contreras Motorsports	Toyota	10	10	Running
2	3	21	Johnny Sauter	GMS Racing	Chevrolet	10	0	Running
3	5	80	Justin Shipley	Jacob Wallace Racing	Ford	10	0	Running
4	7	9	William Byron (R)	Kyle Busch Motorsports	Toyota	10	0	Running
5	4	00	Cole Custer (R)	JR Motorsports	Chevrolet	10	0	Running
6	2	98	Rico Abreu (R)	ThorSport Racing	Toyota	10	0	Running
7	6	50	Travis Kvapil	MAKE Motorsports	Chevrolet	7	0	Running
Official heat 3 results

=== Heat #4 ===
Fin.	St.	#	Driver	Team	Make	Laps	Led	Status
1	1	44	J. R. Heffner	Martins Motorsports	Chevrolet	10	10	Running
2	4	23	Spencer Gallagher	GMS Racing	Chevrolet	10	0	Running
3	2	86	Brandon Brown	Brandonbilt Motorsports	Chevrolet	10	0	Running
4	7	17	Timothy Peters	Red Horse Racing	Toyota	10	0	Running
5	3	02	Tyler Young	Young's Motorsports	Chevrolet	10	0	Running
6	5	78	Chris Fontaine	Glenden Enterprises	Toyota	10	0	Running
7	6	6	Norm Benning	Norm Benning Racing	Chevrolet	10	0	Running
Official heat 4 results

=== Heat #5 ===
Fin.	St.	#	Driver	Team	Make	Laps	Led	Status
1	1	41	Ben Rhodes (R)	ThorSport Racing	Toyota	10	10	Running
2	2	4	Christopher Bell (R)	Kyle Busch Motorsports	Toyota	10	0	Running
3	4	19	Daniel Hemric	Brad Keselowski Racing	Ford	10	0	Running
4	6	13	Cameron Hayley	ThorSport Racing	Toyota	10	0	Running
5	3	07	Sheldon Creed	SS-Green Light Racing	Chevrolet	10	0	Running
6	7	82	Sean Corr	Empire Racing	Chevrolet	10	0	Running
7	5	1	Jennifer Jo Cobb	Jennifer Jo Cobb Racing	Chevrolet	3	0	Accident
Official heat 5 results

=== Last Chance Qualifier ===
The Last Chance Qualifier was held on Wednesday, July 20, at 8:15 PM EST. The race was held for all drivers that did not finish in the top 5 in each of the five heat races. Drivers with high enough owner points would automatically advance to the main event, while drivers with little to no owner points had to finish inside the top two. Cody Coughlin, driving for Kyle Busch Motorsports, would win the Last Chance Qualifier and take the 26th spot. Chris Fontaine, Korbin Forrister, Norm Benning, Sean Corr, and Caleb Roark would fail to qualify for the main event.

Fin.	St.	#	Driver	Team	Make	Laps	Led	Status
1	12	51	Cody Coughlin (R)	Kyle Busch Motorsports	Toyota	15	10	Running
2	3	98	Rico Abreu (R)	ThorSport Racing	Toyota	15	0	Running
3	2	22	Austin Wayne Self (R)	AM Racing	Toyota	15	1	Running
4	4	78	Chris Fontaine	Glenden Enterprises	Toyota	15	4	Running
5	7	43	Korbin Forrister	Empire Racing	Ford	15	0	Running
6	1	49	Wayne Edwards	Premium Motorsports	Chevrolet	15	0	Running
7	9	6	Norm Benning	Norm Benning Racing	Chevrolet	15	0	Running
8	10	1	Jennifer Jo Cobb	Jennifer Jo Cobb Racing	Chevrolet	15	0	Running
9	5	82	Sean Corr	Empire Racing	Chevrolet	15	0	Running
10	6	66	Jordan Anderson	Bolen Motorsports	Chevrolet	4	0	Handling
11	8	50	Travis Kvapil	MAKE Motorsports	Chevrolet	3	0	Handling
12	11	10	Caleb Roark	Jennifer Jo Cobb Racing	Chevrolet	0	0	DNS
Official Last Chance Qualifier results

=== Full starting lineup ===
Pos.	#	Driver	Team	Make
1	63	Bobby Pierce	MB Motorsports	Chevrolet
2	29	Tyler Reddick	Brad Keselowski Racing	Ford
3	71	Ken Schrader	Contreras Motorsports	Toyota
4	44	J. R. Heffner	Martins Motorsports	Chevrolet
5	41	Ben Rhodes	ThorSport Racing	Toyota
6	75	Caleb Holman	Henderson Motorsports	Chevrolet
7	24	Kyle Larson (i)	GMS Racing	Chevrolet
8	21	Johnny Sauter	GMS Racing	Chevrolet
9	23	Spencer Gallagher	GMS Racing	Chevrolet
10	4	Christopher Bell (R)	Kyle Busch Motorsports	Toyota
11	11	Jake Griffin	Red Horse Racing	Toyota
12	16	Stewart Friesen	Halmar Racing	Chevrolet
13	80	Justin Shipley	Jacob Wallace Racing	Ford
14	86	Brandon Brown	Brandonbilt Motorsports	Chevrolet
15	19	Daniel Hemric	Brad Keselowski Racing	Ford
16	05	Brady Boswell	Athenian Motorsports	Chevrolet
17	33	Ben Kennedy	GMS Racing	Chevrolet
18	9	William Byron (R)	Kyle Busch Motorsports	Toyota
19	17	Timothy Peters	Red Horse Racing	Toyota
20	13	Cameron Hayley	ThorSport Racing	Toyota
21	8	John Hunter Nemechek	NEMCO Motorsports	Chevrolet
22	88	Matt Crafton	ThorSport Racing	Toyota
23	00	Cole Custer (R)	JR Motorsports	Chevrolet
24	02	Tyler Young	Young's Motorsports	Chevrolet
25	07	Sheldon Creed	SS-Green Light Racing	Chevrolet
26	51	Cody Coughlin (R)	Kyle Busch Motorsports	Toyota
27	98	Rico Abreu (R)	ThorSport Racing	Toyota
28	22	Austin Wayne Self (R)	AM Racing	Toyota
29	49	Wayne Edwards	Premium Motorsports	Chevrolet
30	1	Jennifer Jo Cobb	Jennifer Jo Cobb Racing	Chevrolet
31	66	Jordan Anderson	Bolen Motorsports	Chevrolet
32	50	Travis Kvapil	MAKE Motorsports	Chevrolet
Failed to qualify
33	78	Chris Fontaine	Glenden Enterprises	Toyota
34	43	Korbin Forrister	Empire Racing	Ford
35	6	Norm Benning	Norm Benning Racing	Chevrolet
36	82	Sean Corr	Empire Racing	Chevrolet
37	10	Caleb Roark	Jennifer Jo Cobb Racing	Chevrolet
Official starting lineup

== Race results ==
Fin	St	#	Driver	Team	Make	Laps	Led	Status	Pts
1	7	24	Kyle Larson (i)	GMS Racing	Chevrolet	150	48	Running	0
2	10	4	Christopher Bell (R)	Kyle Busch Motorsports	Toyota	150	0	Running	31
3	27	98	Rico Abreu (R)	ThorSport Racing	Toyota	150	0	Running	30
4	11	11	Jake Griffin	Red Horse Racing	Toyota	150	0	Running	29
5	2	29	Tyler Reddick	Brad Keselowski Racing	Ford	150	0	Running	28
6	23	00	Cole Custer (R)	JR Motorsports	Chevrolet	150	0	Running	27
7	20	13	Cameron Hayley	ThorSport Racing	Toyota	150	0	Running	26
8	15	19	Daniel Hemric	Brad Keselowski Racing	Ford	150	0	Running	25
9	28	22	Austin Wayne Self (R)	AM Racing	Toyota	150	0	Running	24
10	22	88	Matt Crafton	ThorSport Racing	Toyota	150	0	Running	23
11	17	33	Ben Kennedy	GMS Racing	Chevrolet	150	0	Running	22
12	3	71	Ken Schrader	Contreras Motorsports	Toyota	150	0	Running	21
13	8	21	Johnny Sauter	GMS Racing	Chevrolet	150	0	Running	20
14	18	9	William Byron (R)	Kyle Busch Motorsports	Toyota	150	0	Running	19
15	4	44	J. R. Heffner	Martins Motorsports	Chevrolet	150	0	Running	18
16	25	07	Sheldon Creed	SS-Green Light Racing	Chevrolet	148	0	Running	17
17	32	50	Travis Kvapil	MAKE Motorsports	Chevrolet	146	0	Running	16
18	29	49	Wayne Edwards	Premium Motorsports	Chevrolet	145	0	Running	15
19	26	51	Cody Coughlin (R)	Kyle Busch Motorsports	Toyota	144	0	Running	14
20	24	02	Tyler Young	Young's Motorsports	Chevrolet	143	0	Running	13
21	16	05	Brady Boswell	Athenian Motorsports	Chevrolet	143	0	Running	12
22	14	86	Brandon Brown	Brandonbilt Motorsports	Chevrolet	139	0	Running	11
23	5	41	Ben Rhodes (R)	ThorSport Racing	Toyota	136	0	Running	10
24	21	8	John Hunter Nemechek	NEMCO Motorsports	Chevrolet	129	0	Running	9
25	1	63	Bobby Pierce	MB Motorsports	Chevrolet	126	102	Accident	10
26	30	1	Jennifer Jo Cobb	Jennifer Jo Cobb Racing	Chevrolet	124	0	Running	7
27	19	17	Timothy Peters	Red Horse Racing	Toyota	116	0	Running	6
28	12	16	Stewart Friesen	Halmar Racing	Chevrolet	111	0	Accident	5
29	9	23	Spencer Gallagher	GMS Racing	Chevrolet	107	0	Running	4
30	6	75	Caleb Holman	Henderson Motorsports	Chevrolet	37	0	Accident	3
31	13	80	Justin Shipley	Jacob Wallace Racing	Ford	11	0	Overheating	2
32	31	66	Jordan Anderson	Bolen Motorsports	Chevrolet	5	0	Engine	1
Official race results

== Standings after the race ==
Drivers' Championship standings

	Pos	Driver	Points
	1	William Byron	282
	2	Matt Crafton	273 (−9)
	3	Daniel Hemric	271 (−11)
1	4	Johnny Sauter	253 (−29)
1	5	Timothy Peters	252 (−30)
2	6	Christopher Bell	245 (−37)
	7	Tyler Reddick	243 (−39)
2	8	John Hunter Nemechek	232 (−50)
Official driver's standings

- Note: Only the first 8 positions are included for the driver standings.

Previous race: 2016 Buckle Up in Your Truck 225	NASCAR Camping World Truck Series; 2016 season	Next race: 2016 Pocono Mountains 150
