= Rico Abreu =

American racing driver (born 1992)

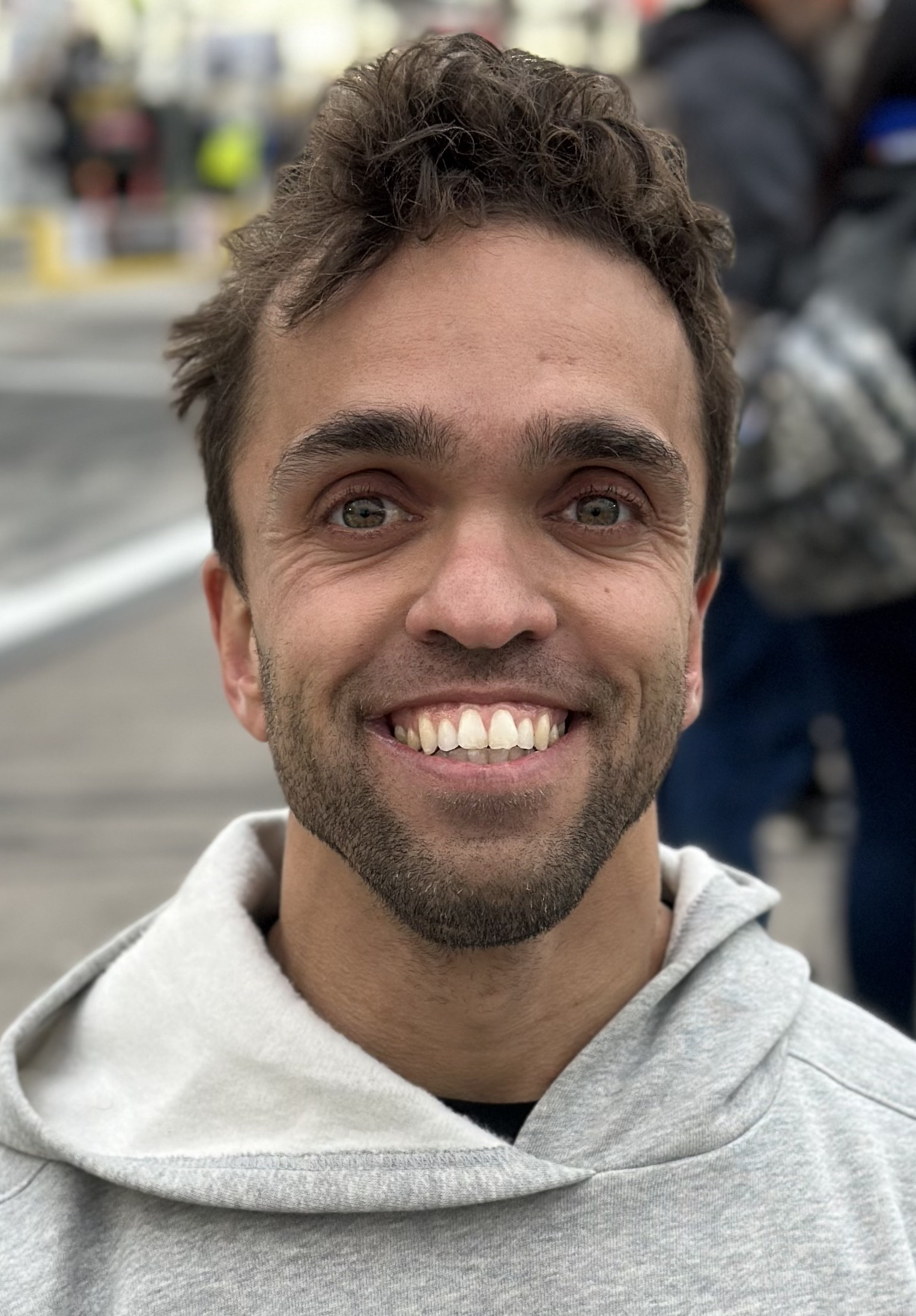
- Abreu at Las Vegas Motor Speedway in 2025
- Born: Rico Emanuel Abreu; January 30, 1992 (age 34); St. Helena, California, U.S.
- Height: 4 ft 4 in (1.32 m)
- Weight: 95 lb (43 kg)
- Achievements: 2015, 2016 Chili Bowl Winner; 2015 Pepsi Nationals Winner; 2014 USAC National Midget Series Champion; 2014 Belleville Midget Nationals Champion; 2025, 2026 High Limit Racing Champion

NASCAR FedEx Freight Truck Series career
- 26 races run over 3 years
- 2017 position: 68th
- Best finish: 13th (2016)
- First race: 2015 Lucas Oil 150 (Phoenix)
- Last race: 2017 Eldora Dirt Derby (Eldora)
Wins	Top tens	Poles
0	5	0

ARCA Menards Series East career
- 14 races run over 1 year
- Best finish: 5th (2015)
- First race: 2015 The Hart to Heart Breast Cancer Foundation 150 (New Smyrna)
- Last race: 2015 Drive Sober 125 (Dover)
- First win: 2015 NAPA 150 (Columbus)
Wins	Top tens	Poles
1	8	3
- Statistics up to date as of October 17, 2026.

Rico Emanuel Abreu (born January 30, 1992) is an American professional dirt track and stock car racing driver. Abreu won the 2014 USAC National Midget Series championship, and previously competed in the NASCAR K&N Pro Series East in 2015, scoring one win.

== Racing career ==
=== Early career and dirt racing ===
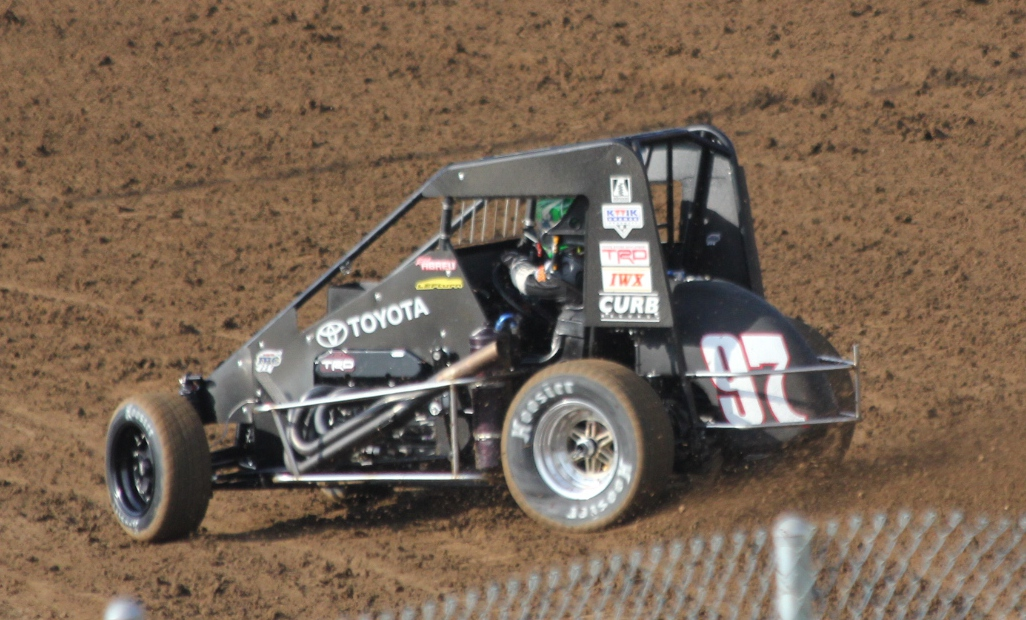
Abreu's midget at Angell Park Speedway

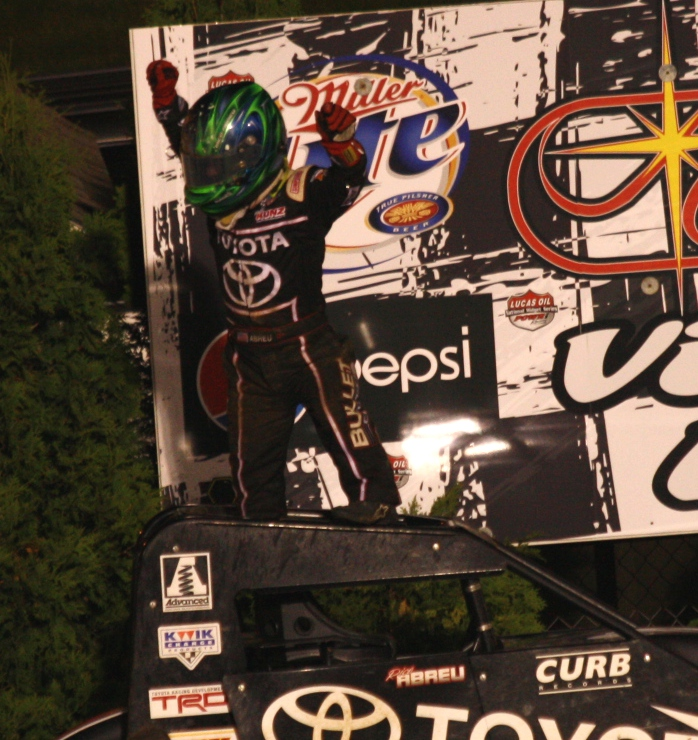
Abreu celebrating after winning a 2013 midget car race

Abreu first began racing dirt bikes, but after watching an Outlaw kart race in Vallejo, California, started to race shifter karts. When he turned 15, he was given his first Outlaw kart. To support his career, his father built a 1/8th-mile asphalt oval in his backyard. On January 24, 2009, Abreu made his Outlaw kart debut at Lakeport Indoor Speedway, finishing fourth, and scored his first Outlaw win at Cycleland Speedway. During the year, local driver Kyle Larson met Abreu at a charity karting event held at Abreu's backyard oval and, in 2011, introduced him to sprint cars. During the year, he made his Chili Bowl Nationals debut, along with running his first World of Outlaws sprint car race. He would eventually win the 2011 360 Winged Sprint Car Series Rookie of the Year Award. In 2012, Abreu raced in the USAC National Midget Series, clinching Rookie of the Year, while qualifying for the A-main at the Chili Bowl. The next year, he won the Belleville Midget Nationals, the Johnny Key Classic at Ocean Speedway, the 4 Crown Nationals at Eldora Speedway and the USAC Gold Crown at Tri City Speedway. In 2014, he won his first WoO race at the Thunderbowl Raceway and later won the USAC Honda Midget Series national title.

On January 17, 2015, Abreu returned to the Chili Bowl. On lap 26 he passed the previous year's winner Bryan Clauson and held off four-time Chili Bowl winner Kevin Swindell to win. The win was Toyota's first Chili Bowl victory and the first for owner Keith Kunz since 2002. The following year, Abreu repeated his Chili Bowl win after defeating Clauson and Zach Daum.

=== K&N Pro Series East ===
On January 20, 2015, Abreu was hired by HScott Motorsports to run full-time in the K&N Pro Series East. He made his stock car debut in the Pete Orr Memorial Super Late Model 100 at New Smyrna Speedway later in the week. On July 4, 2015, Abreu won his first ever race in the K&N Pro Series East at Columbus Motor Speedway after starting from the pole position, setting a new track record.

=== Camping World Truck Series ===
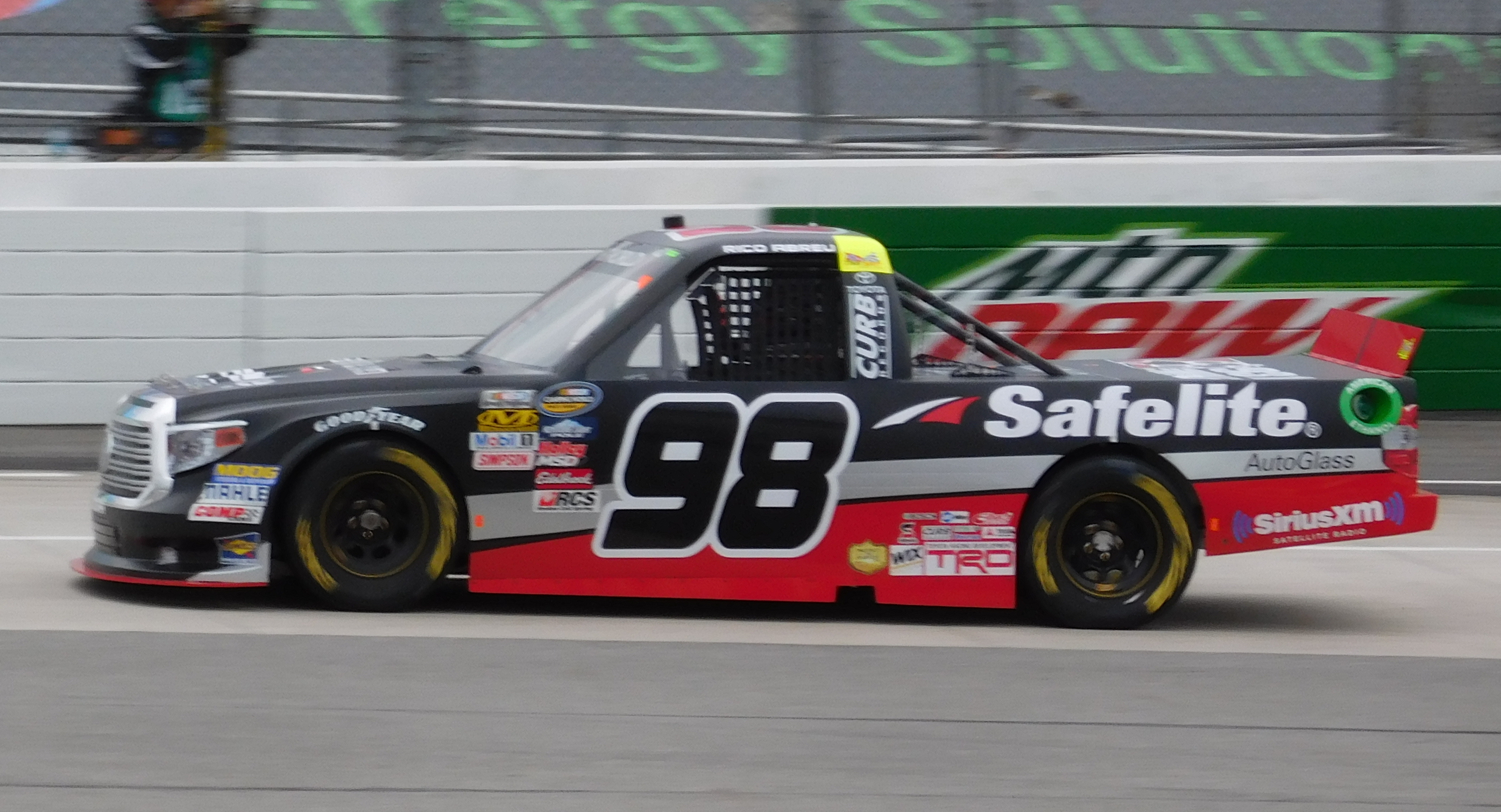
Abreu at Martinsville in 2016.

During the 2015 season, Abreu made his Camping World Truck Series debut in the Lucas Oil 150 at Phoenix International Raceway, driving the No. 31 Chevrolet Silverado for NTS Motorsports. In 2016, he signed a full-time drive for ThorSport Racing, replacing Johnny Sauter who left for GMS Racing.

Abreu almost won his first career NCWTS race at Texas on June 10. He was within a car length of race leader William Byron with 2 laps to go, but scraped the wall and ended up cutting a tire, all but riding the wall for the last lap and a half. He still ended up finishing a career-best 9th place.

On January 11, 2017, it was reported that Abreu will not return to ThorSport Racing due to sponsorship issues. However, he returned to the team for a one-off at Eldora.

== Personal life ==
Born to a Portuguese father and Italian mother, Abreu currently lives in Rutherford, California. His father, David, is a vineyard manager. He also has a brother and a sister. Among Abreu's hobbies is fishing.

In January 2023, Abreu announced his engagement to Meagan Droud after a ten-year relationship. The couple married in February 2024.

Abreu is 4 ft 4 in (1.32 m) tall and weighs 95 pounds (43 kg). He was born with achondroplasia, a genetic disorder that is the most common cause of dwarfism. Due to his short stature, he needs special modifications to the cockpit area of his race cars, such as foot blocks to help him reach the throttle. The car is also modified for Abreu, such as the pedals and the steering column being lengthened, with the powertrain and a-frame moved 6 inches (15 cm). For stock cars, the steering column, pedals, and switches are moved, while the remainder of the cockpit remains the same.

== Motorsports career results ==
=== NASCAR ===
(key) (Bold – Pole position awarded by qualifying time. Italics – Pole position earned by points standings or practice time. * – Most laps led.)

==== Camping World Truck Series ====
NASCAR Camping World Truck Series results
Year	Team	No.	Make	1	2	3	4	5	6	7	8	9	10	11	12	13	14	15	16	17	18	19	20	21	22	23	NCWTC	Pts	Ref
2015	NTS Motorsports	31	Chevy	DAY	ATL	MAR	KAN	CLT	DOV	TEX	GTW	IOW	KEN	ELD	POC	MCH	BRI	MSP	CHI	NHA	LVS	TAL	MAR	TEX	PHO; 28	HOM; 13	53rd	46	
2016	ThorSport Racing	98	Toyota	DAY; 29	ATL; 11	MAR; 10	KAN; 22	DOV; 22	CLT; 20	TEX; 9	IOW; 18	GTW; 14	KEN; 15	ELD; 3	POC; 6	BRI; 26	MCH; 13	MSP; 27	CHI; 19	NHA; 17	LVS; 20	TAL; 4	MAR; 24	TEX; 12	PHO; 11	HOM; 13	13th	395	
2017	ThorSport Racing	89	Toyota	DAY	ATL	MAR	KAN	CLT	DOV	TEX	GTW	IOW	KEN	ELD; 26	POC	MCH	BRI	MSP	CHI	NHA	LVS	TAL	MAR	TEX	PHO	HOM	68th	14	

^{*} Season still in progress
^{1} Ineligible for series points

==== K&N Pro Series East ====
NASCAR K&N Pro Series East results
Year	Team	No.	Make	1	2	3	4	5	6	7	8	9	10	11	12	13	14	NKNPSEC	Pts	Ref
2015	HScott Motorsports with Justin Marks	98	Chevy	NSM; 17	GRE; 9	BRI; 10	IOW; 30	BGS; 11	LGY; 9	**COL**; 1*	NHA; 10	IOW; 4	GLN; 12	MOT; 2	VIR; 16	RCH; 11	DOV; 3	5th	492	
