= Stewart Friesen =

Canadian racing driver (born 1983)

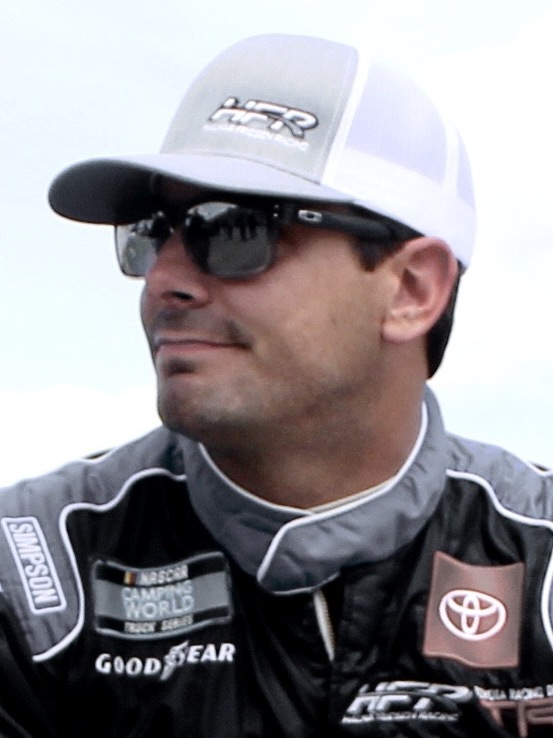
- Friesen at Darlington Raceway in 2021
- Born: Stewart J. Friesen; July 25, 1983 (age 43); Niagara-on-the-Lake, Ontario, Canada
- Awards: 2010, 2014, 2015, 2020, 2021 EMPA North East Driver of the Year

NASCAR Cup Series career
- 1 race run over 1 year
- 2021 position: 55th
- Best finish: 55th (2021)
- First race: 2021 Food City Dirt Race (Bristol Dirt)
Wins	Top tens	Poles
0	0	0

NASCAR FedEx Freight Truck Series career
- 225 races run over 11 years
- Truck no., team: No. 52 (Halmar Friesen Racing)
- 2026 position: 12th
- Best finish: 4th (2019)
- First race: 2016 Aspen Dental Eldora Dirt Derby (Eldora)
- Last race: 2026 Craftsman 200 (Homestead)
- First win: 2019 Eldora Dirt Derby (Eldora)
- Last win: 2025 DQS Solutions & Staffing 250 (Michigan)
Wins	Top tens	Poles
4	100	4

NASCAR Canada Series career
- 3 races run over 2 years
- 2023 position: 40th
- Best finish: 39th (2022)
- First race: 2022 Pinty's 100 (Ohsweken)
- Last race: 2023 Pinty's 100 (Ohsweken)
Wins	Top tens	Poles
0	1	0

ARCA Menards Series career
- 1 race run over 1 year
- Best finish: 101st (2026)
- First race: 2026 Lime Rock Park ARCA 100 (Lime Rock)
Wins	Top tens	Poles
0	0	0

Modified racing career
- Debut season: 2000
- Car number: 1, 10a, 20, 24, 44
- Wins: 433

Previous series
- 2013–present Wins 1999–2013 Wins: Sprint car racing 19; TQ Midgets; 7

Championship titles
- 2020, 2021, 2026 American Racer Cup; 2020 Mr. DIRTcar Champion; 2015, 2016, 2020 Short Track Super Series; 2014 NASCAR New York State Champion; 2010, 2013, 2014, 2015 Race of Champions Dirt Modified Tour
- Statistics up to date as of November 6, 2026.

Stewart J. Friesen (born July 25, 1983) is a Canadian-American professional dirt track and stock car racing driver. He competes full-time in the NASCAR Truck Series, driving the No. 52 Toyota Tundra TRD Pro for Halmar Friesen Racing, and part-time at local dirt tracks across New York, Pennsylvania, New Jersey, and elsewhere in the United States, driving the No. 44 car for HFR.

== Racing career ==
=== Early years ===
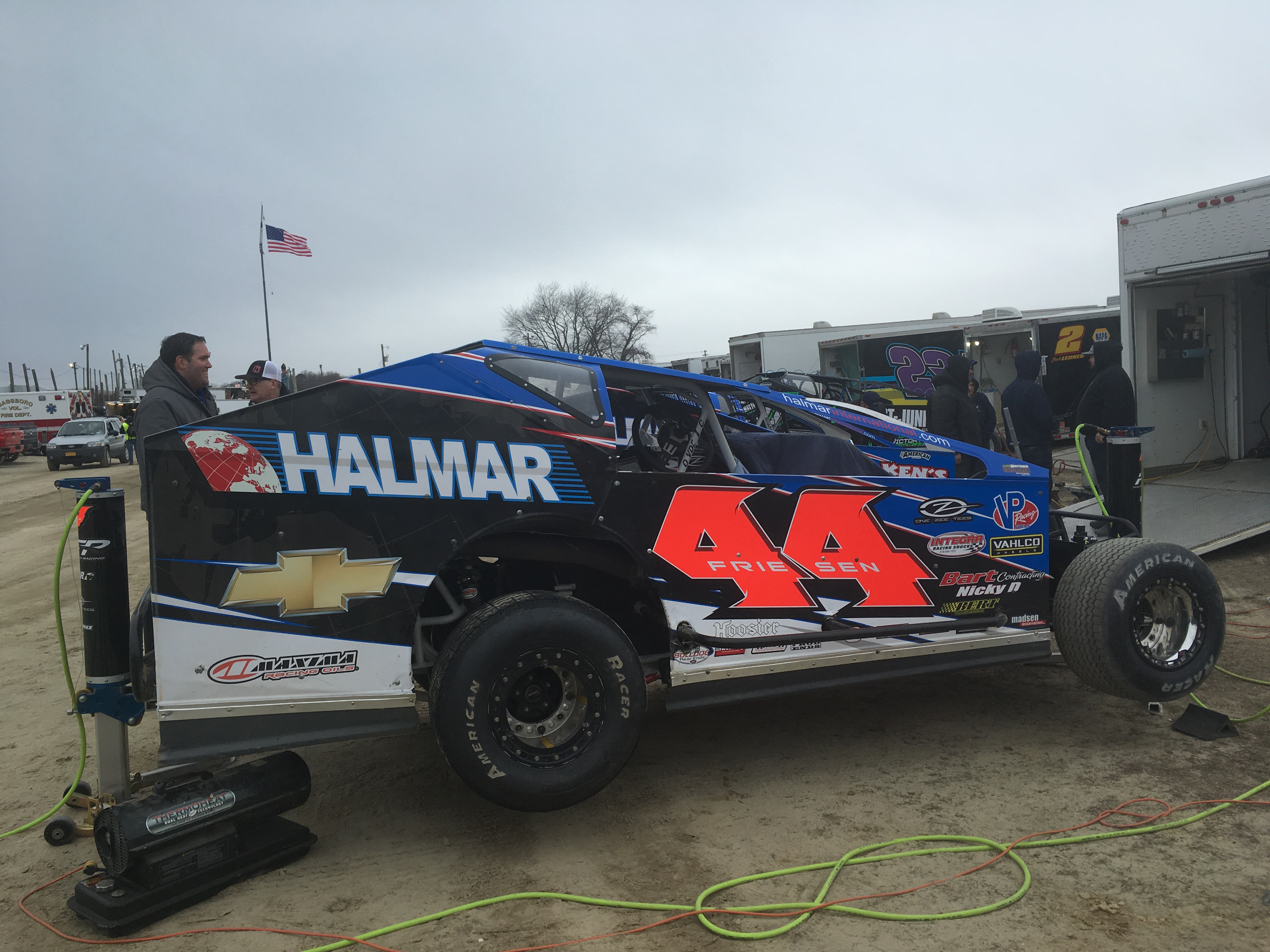
Friesen's modified car at Georgetown Speedway in March 2018

Friesen started racing early in life, his family owning Ransomville Speedway in Western New York. After racing go-karts, Friesen raced big-blocks with widespread success in the Northeast United States, advancing to the 2010 World Finals at Charlotte Motor Speedway. He was the 2012, 2013, 2014, and 2015 Modified track champion at Fonda Speedway.

Friesen was one of the top competitors in the SuperDIRT Series in the mid-2010s, and he also has triumphed in the World of Outlaws sprint car series, winning over 230 career races as of the end of the 2017 season. He has won the Syracuse 200 Modified race four times. Friesen has run over nine-hundred dirt races in his career. Eventually, he met Chris Larsen, who gave Friesen his first NASCAR ride at Eldora Speedway, which was supposed to be a one-time deal. However, the partnership blossomed into a full-time ride.

On occasion, Friesen runs NASCAR and dirt on the same day. He maintains an active presence on New York dirt tracks such as Fonda Speedway and Utica-Rome Speedway.

=== NASCAR ===
Breaking into NASCAR with the 2016 Aspen Dental Eldora Dirt Derby, Friesen put his No. 16 Halmar Racing truck into the twelfth starting spot on the grid by virtue of a second-place finish in his heat. However, contact with Caleb Holman ruined his night, and Friesen's debut race resulted in a 28th-place finish. Running five more races in the season, Friesen recorded three top-twenty finishes, the best being a thirteenth at New Hampshire Motor Speedway.

On January 9, 2017, Friesen announced that he would run the full 2017 season in the Halmar Friesen Racing (HFR) No. 52 truck with Tommy Baldwin Jr. coming on as a team manager. In June, following the first seven races of the season, HFR announced it would undergo a two-week hiatus before returning at Kentucky Speedway in July. At Eldora, Friesen qualified on the pole position and remained in the place for the start of the feature after winning his heat race. He led more than half the laps and claimed the victory in the second stage but lost the lead to Matt Crafton in the closing laps, finishing a then-career-best second. About a month after Eldora run, the team took another two-race break while severing its relationship with Baldwin and making a new technical alliance with GMS Racing. After returning to competition, Friesen scored four finishes of seventh or better in the season's last six races, climbing to fourteenth in the season-ending points tally.

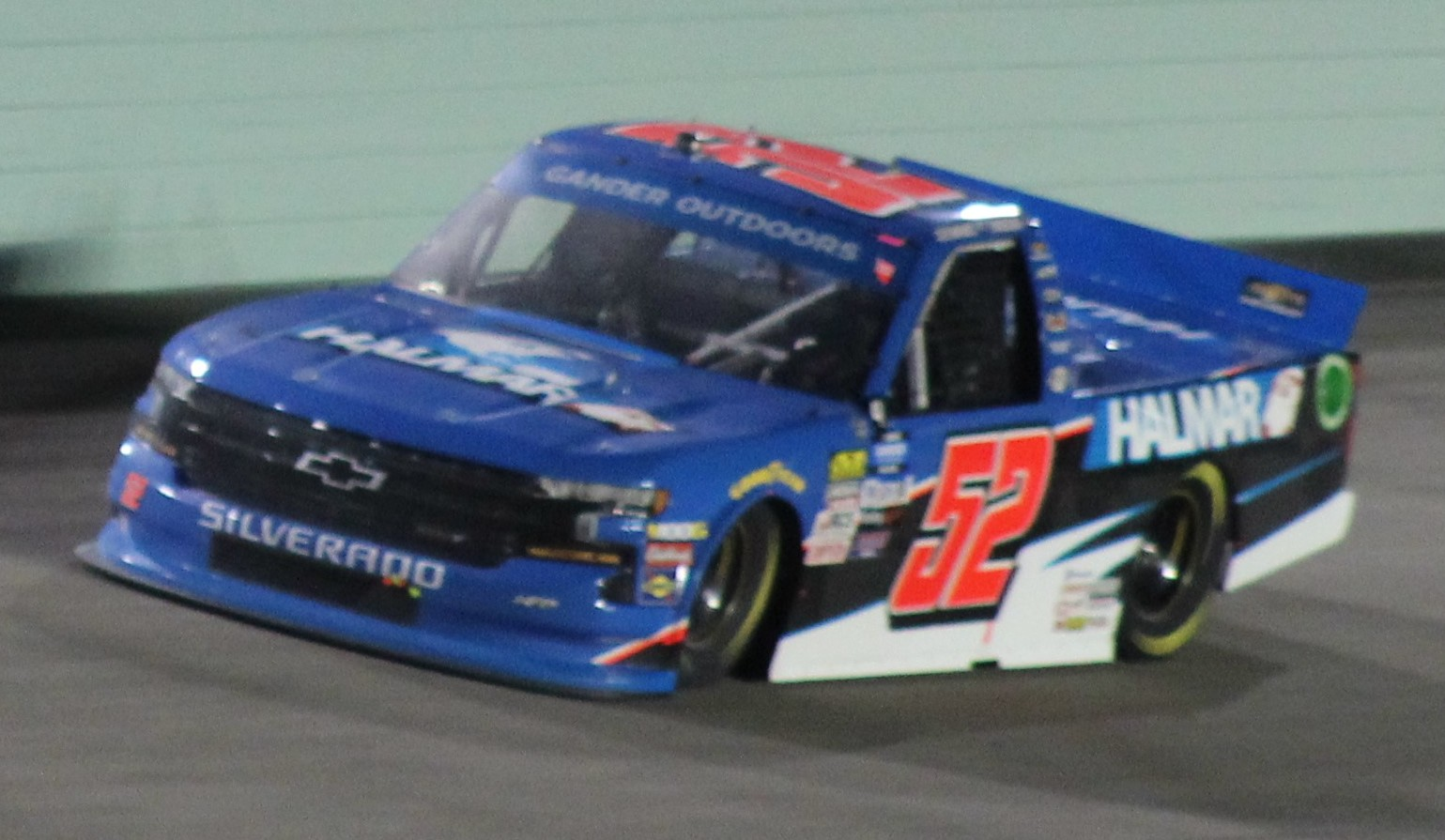
Friesen's 2019 truck at Homestead

For 2018, HFR continued the alliance with GMS, so much so that GMS driver Johnny Sauter referenced Friesen as a teammate. After advancing to the playoffs and a best finish of second on three occasions throughout the year, he finished seventh in the final points standings after being eliminated in the Round of 8.

Friesen remained at HFR in an alliance with GMS for the third straight year in 2019. He was also contacted by JR Motorsports to run a partial schedule in the NASCAR Xfinity Series, but nothing came of it. At Kansas Speedway, Friesen led both practices, won both Stage One and Stage Two and led the most laps, but ran out of fuel with three laps to go due to a pit communication on the previous pit stop, in which the fuelman did not put enough fuel in the truck, handing the win to Ross Chastain and relegating Friesen to fifteenth, furthering a streak of near-misses for Friesen. On August 1, 2019, Friesen won his first career NASCAR Gander Outdoors Truck Series race at Eldora. On November 8, Friesen achieved his second career victory and his first on a paved track by winning at Phoenix after passing Brandon Jones with four laps remaining. As a result, Friesen qualified for the Championship 4 for the first time but ultimately finished eleventh at Homestead and fourth in the final standings.

After missing the playoffs in 2020, Friesen later abandoned a full-time Truck schedule and skipped a race at Kansas Speedway in order to run the Short Track Super Series at Port Royal Speedway. On the night of the Kansas truck event, Friesen finished second to Mat Williamson in a $53,000-to-win race at Port Royal.

Friesen returned with his No. 52 team to the Truck Series full-time in 2021, and despite having a worse season and missing the playoffs in 2020, HFR remained with Toyota. Later in the year, Friesen would make his debut in the NASCAR Cup Series, driving the No. 77 for Spire Motorsports in the series' new dirt race at Bristol. Despite driving a Toyota in the Truck Series, Friesen drove for Spire, a Chevrolet team, in this one race. He finished 23rd, one lap down. Despite not winning a Truck race for the second straight season, Friesen made the Playoffs, scored his best of second in the season finale at Phoenix, and finished sixth in the final standings.

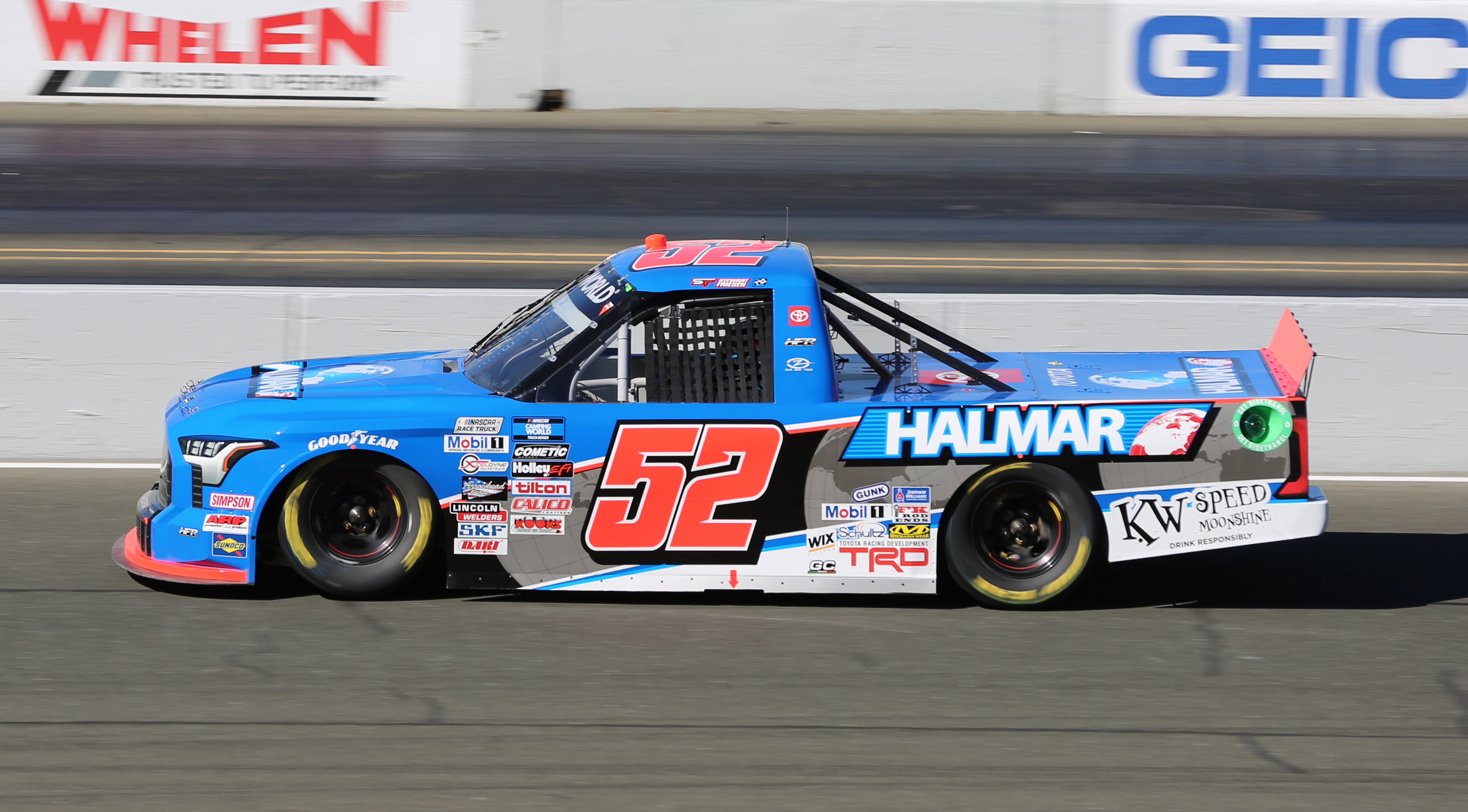
Friesen's No. 52 truck at Sonoma Raceway in 2022

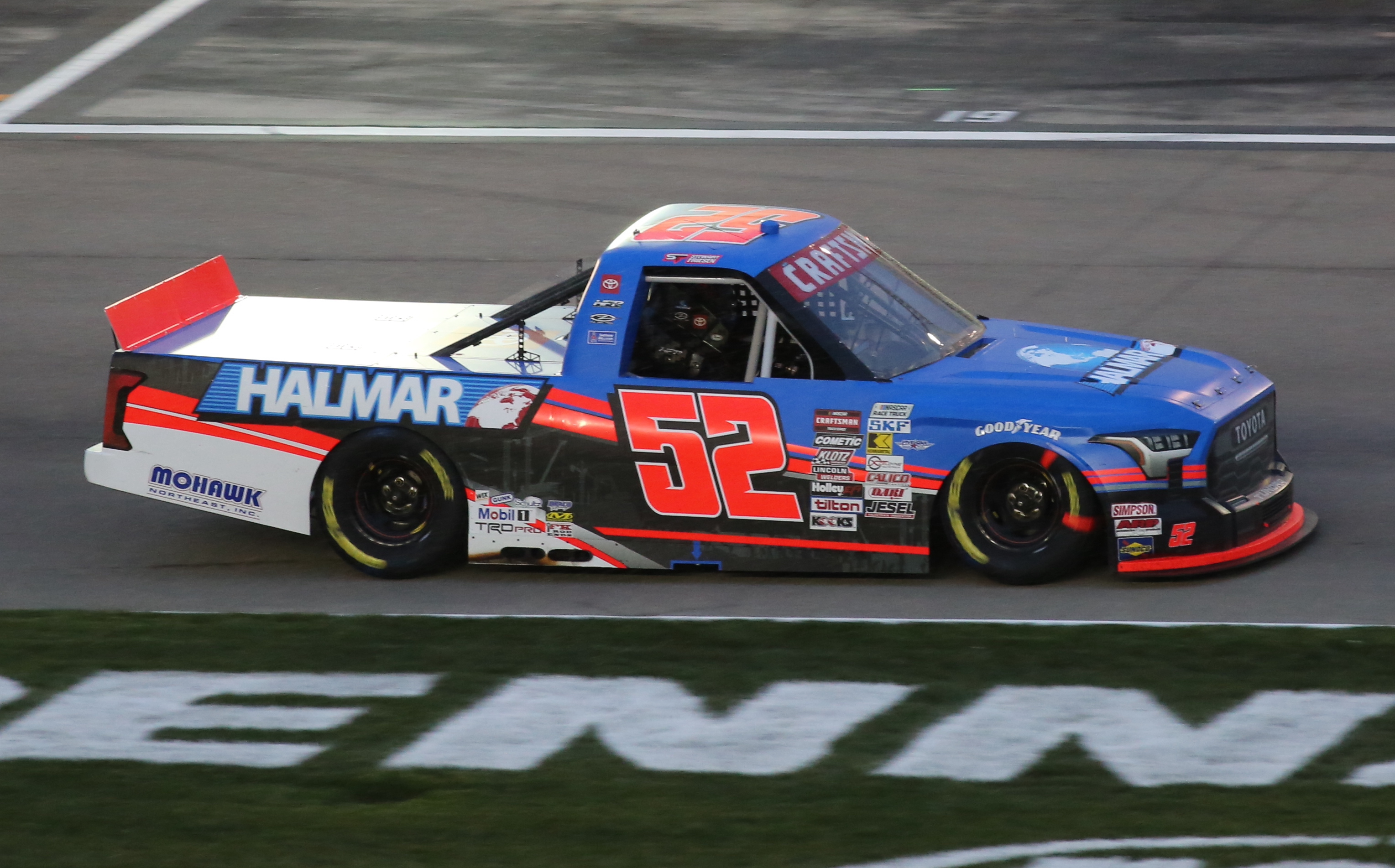
Friesen's No. 52 truck at Las Vegas Motor Speedway in 2025

On May 20, 2022, Friesen broke a 54-race winless streak in the Truck Series by scoring his third career victory at Texas after passing Christian Eckes for the lead in Overtime.

Friesen returned to the Truck Series in 2023. He scored five top-fives and seven top-tens, but went winless and missed the playoffs. He finished twelfth in the final standings.

The 2024 season would follow a similar trend, with Friesen scoring seven top-ten finishes and one top-five, as well as a pole at Nashville. He would again finish twelfth in the standings.

Friesen started the 2025 season with a 23rd-place finish at Daytona. Friesen broke a 72-race drought with a win at Michigan in triple-overtime.

On July 28, 2025, Friesen was competing in a Super DIRTcar Series event at the Autodrome Drummond when he suffered a high-speed accident that resulted in a fractured pelvis and right leg. Friesen was forced to sit-out the remainder of the season due to the injuries he suffered. Christopher Bell filled in for him at Watkins Glen, and Kaden Honeycutt, who had just been released from his ride at Niece Motorsports, would drive for the final eight races, starting at Richmond. After a quick return to racing, Friesen won his 100th race at Fonda Speedway in April 2026.

== Personal life ==
Friesen grew up in Niagara-on-the-Lake, Ontario, and played hockey as a child. He attended the University of Windsor, attaining a degree in science.

Friesen is married to Jessica Friesen (née Zemken). The two have one son. Friesen and his wife also run a t-shirt printing business (One-Zee Tees), which was originally a fallback plan in case racing did not work out. They live in Sprakers, New York.

== Motorsports career results ==
=== Racing career summary ===
Season	Series	Team	Races	Wins	Top 5	Top 10	Points	Position
2016	NASCAR Camping World Truck Series	Halmar Racing	6	0	0	0	69	33rd
2017	NASCAR Camping World Truck Series	Halmar Friesen Racing	19	0	2	5	422	14th
2018	CARS Super Late Model Tour	N/A	2	0	2	2	0	N/A
2018	NASCAR Camping World Truck Series	Halmar Friesen Racing	23	0	9	16	2265	7th
2019	NASCAR Gander Outdoors Truck Series	Halmar Friesen Racing	23	2	12	15	4026	4th
2020	NASCAR Gander Outdoors Truck Series	Halmar Friesen Racing	22	0	3	12	504	15th
2021	NASCAR Camping World Truck Series	Halmar Friesen Racing	22	0	7	9	2275	6th
2021	NASCAR Cup Series	Spire Motorsports	1	0	0	0	0	NC†
2022	NASCAR Pinty's Series	22 Racing	1	0	1	1	42	39th
2022	NASCAR Camping World Truck Series	Halmar Friesen Racing	23	1	9	13	2276	6th
2023	NASCAR Pinty's Series	Wight Motorsports	2	0	0	1	60	40th
2023	NASCAR Craftsman Truck Series	Halmar Friesen Racing	23	0	5	7	537	12th
2024	NASCAR Craftsman Truck Series	Halmar Friesen Racing	23	0	1	7	557	12th
2025	NASCAR Craftsman Truck Series	Halmar Friesen Racing	16	1	3	6	397	20th
2026	ARCA Menards Series	Cook Racing Technologies	1	0	0	0	31	101st
2026	NASCAR Craftsman Truck Series	Halmar Friesen Racing	25	0	4	9	536	12th

^{†} As Friesen was a guest driver, he was ineligible for championship points.

=== NASCAR ===
(key) (Bold – Pole position awarded by qualifying time. Italics – Pole position earned by points standings or practice time. * – Most laps led. Small number below track name denotes finishing position.)

==== Cup Series ====
NASCAR Cup Series results
Year	Team	No.	Make	1	2	3	4	5	6	7	8	9	10	11	12	13	14	15	16	17	18	19	20	21	22	23	24	25	26	27	28	29	30	31	32	33	34	35	36	NCSC	Pts	Ref
2021	Spire Motorsports	77	Chevy	DAY	DRC	HOM	LVS	PHO	ATL	BRD; 23	MAR	RCH	TAL	KAN	DAR	DOV	COA	CLT	SON	NSH	POC	POC	ROA	ATL	NHA	GLN	IRC	MCH	DAY	DAR	RCH	BRI	LVS	TAL	ROV	TEX	KAN	MAR	PHO	55th	0^{1}	

==== Truck Series ====
NASCAR Truck Series results
Year	Team	No.	Make	1	2	3	4	5	6	7	8	9	10	11	12	13	14	15	16	17	18	19	20	21	22	23	24	25	NTSC	Pts	Ref
2016	Halmar Racing	16	Chevy	DAY	ATL	MAR	KAN	DOV	CLT	TEX	IOW	GTW	KEN	ELD; 28	POC	BRI; 22	MCH	MSP	CHI	NHA; 13	LVS; 19	TAL	MAR	TEX	PHO; 18	HOM; 29			33rd	69	
2017	Halmar Friesen Racing	52	Chevy	DAY; 31	ATL; 19	MAR; 25	KAN; 32	CLT; 23	DOV; 28	TEX; 22	GTW	IOW	KEN; 12	**ELD**; 2*	POC; 12	MCH; 13	BRI; 29	MSP	CHI	NHA; 5	LVS; 23	TAL; 17	MAR; 6	TEX; 14	PHO; 6	HOM; 7			14th	422	
2018	Halmar Friesen Racing	52	Chevy	DAY; 27	ATL; 6	LVS; 5	MAR; 20	DOV; 23	KAN; 3	CLT; 6	**TEX**; 2	IOW; 9	GTW; 13	CHI; 19	KEN; 2	ELD; 3	POC; 4	MCH; 8	BRI; 2	MSP; 7	LVS; 17	TAL; 6	MAR; 11	TEX; 8	PHO; 5	HOM; 4			7th	2265	
2019	Halmar Friesen Racing	52	Chevy	DAY; 10	ATL; 18	LVS; 4	**MAR**; 5	TEX; 2	DOV; 12	KAN; 15*	CLT; 3	TEX; 20	IOW; 5	GTW; 3	CHI; 3	KEN; 2	POC; 32	ELD; 1	MCH; 8	BRI; 4	MSP; 7	LVS; 19	TAL; 5	MAR; 6	PHO; 1	HOM; 11			4th	4026	
2020	Halmar Friesen Racing	52	Toyota	DAY; 21	LVS; 9	CLT; 30	ATL; 10	HOM; 14	POC; 8	KEN; 15	TEX; 4	KAN; 27	KAN; 34	MCH; 39	DRC; 10	DOV; 9	GTW; 5	DAR; 8	RCH; 10	BRI; 32	LVS; 4	TAL; 17	KAN	TEX; 28	MAR; 6	PHO; 6			15th	504	
2021	Halmar Friesen Racing	52	Toyota	DAY; 32	DRC; 11	LVS; 4	ATL; 10	BRD; 12	RCH; 13	KAN; 14	DAR; 25	COA; 17	CLT; 4	TEX; 34	NSH; 5	POC; 33	KNX; 27	GLN; 20	GTW; 4	DAR; 3	BRI; 4	LVS; 6	TAL; 22	MAR; 17	PHO; 2				6th	2275	
2022	Halmar Friesen Racing	52	Toyota	DAY; 16	LVS; 3	ATL; 6*	COA; 9	MAR; 13	BRD; 11	DAR; 12	KAN; 14	TEX; 1*	CLT; 9	GTW; 4	SON; 31	KNX; 5	NSH; 5	MOH; 4	POC; 14	IRP; 4	RCH; 11	KAN; 20	BRI; 7	TAL; 20	HOM; 3	PHO; 5			6th	2276	
2023	Halmar Friesen Racing	52	Toyota	DAY; 28	LVS; 14	ATL; 22	COA; 14	TEX; 3	BRD; 23	MAR; 31	KAN; 4	DAR; 2	NWS; 13	CLT; 22	GTW; 3	NSH; 18	MOH; 4	POC; 32	RCH; 27	IRP; 30	MLW; 30	KAN; 7	BRI; 14	TAL; 34	HOM; 6	PHO; 24			12th	537	
2024	Halmar Friesen Racing	52	Toyota	DAY; 14	ATL; 23	LVS; 18	BRI; 22	COA; 20	MAR; 19	TEX; 13	KAN; 25	DAR; 14	NWS; 10	CLT; 2	GTW; 8	**NSH**; 11	POC; 7	IRP; 33	RCH; 25	MLW; 20	BRI; 9	KAN; 24	TAL; 13	HOM; 6	MAR; 10	PHO; 18			12th	557	
2025	Halmar Friesen Racing	52	Toyota	DAY; 23	ATL; 2	LVS; 6	HOM; 16	MAR; 9	BRI; 27	CAR; 29	TEX; 24	KAN; 5	NWS; 14	CLT; 13	NSH; 21	MCH; 1	POC; 8	LRP; 23	IRP; 35	GLN	RCH	DAR	BRI	NHA	ROV	TAL	MAR	PHO	20th	397	
2026	Halmar Friesen Racing	52	Toyota	DAY; 10	ATL; 20	STP; 26	DAR; 25	CAR; 4	BRI; 16	TEX; 19	GLN; 18	DOV; 11	CLT; 27	NSH; 6	MCH; 22	COR; 33	LRP; 9	NWS; 8	IRP; 6	RCH; 36	NHA; 4	BRI; 3	KAN; 21	CLT; 35	PHO; 19	TAL; 30	MAR; 30	HOM; 5	12th	536	
2027	Halmar Friesen Racing	52	Toyota	DAY	ATL	STP	DAR	BRI	TEX	KAN	NWS	CLT	NSS	POC	MCH	LRP	ATL	IRP	BRI	BGS	MSP	NHA	KAN	CLT	PHO	TAL	MAR	HOM			

^{*} Season still in progress
^{1} Ineligible for series points

==== Pinty's Series ====
NASCAR Pinty's Series results
Year	Team	No.	Make	1	2	3	4	5	6	7	8	9	10	11	12	13	14	NPSC	Pts	Ref
2022	22 Racing	22	Chevy	SUN	MSP	ACD	AVE	TOR	EDM	SAS	SAS	CTR	OSK; 2	ICAR	MSP	DEL		39th	42	
2023	Wight Motorsports	19	Chevy	SUN	MSP	ACD	AVE	TOR	EIR	SAS	SAS	CTR	OSK; 6	OSK; 22	ICAR	MSP	DEL	40th	60	

=== ARCA Menards Series ===
(key) (Bold – Pole position awarded by qualifying time. Italics – Pole position earned by points standings or practice time. * – Most laps led.)

ARCA Menards Series results
Year	Team	No.	Make	1	2	3	4	5	6	7	8	9	10	11	12	13	14	15	16	17	18	19	20	AMSC	Pts	Ref
2026	Cook Racing Technologies	17	Toyota	DAY	PHO	KAN	TAL	GLN	TOL	MCH	POC	BER	ELK	CHI	LRP; 13	IRP	IOW	ISF	MAD	DSF	SLM	BRI	KAN	101st	31	

=== CARS Super Late Model Tour ===
(key)

CARS Super Late Model Tour results
Year	Team	No.	Make	1	2	3	4	5	6	7	8	9	CSLMTC	Pts	Ref
2018	N/A	112	Toyota	MYB	NSH; 2	ROU	HCY						N/A	0	
2018	N/A	112	Chevy					BRI; 2	AND	HCY	ROU	SBO	N/A	0	
