= 2017 Texas Roadhouse 200 =

20th race of the 2017 NASCAR Camping World Truck Series

2017 Texas Roadhouse 200 presented by Alpha Energy Solutions
Race details
- Race 20 of 23 of the 2017 NASCAR Camping World Truck Series
- Date: October 28, 2017
- Official name: 19th Annual Texas Roadhouse 200 presented by Alpha Energy Solutions
- Location: Martinsville, Virginia, Martinsville Speedway
- Course: Permanent racing facility
- Course length: 0.526 miles (0.847 km)
- Distance: 200 laps, 105.2 mi (169.302 km)
- Scheduled distance: 200 laps, 105.2 mi (169.302 km)
- Average speed: 67.932 miles per hour (109.326 km/h)

Pole position
Driver	Chase Briscoe	Brad Keselowski Racing
- Time: 19.774

Most laps led
Driver	Matt Crafton	ThorSport Racing
- Laps: 102

Winner
No. 18	Noah Gragson	Kyle Busch Motorsports

Television in the United States
- Network: Fox Sports 1
- Announcers: Vince Welch, Phil Parsons, Michael Waltrip

Radio in the United States
- Radio: Motor Racing Network

The 2017 Texas Roadhouse 200 presented by Alpha Energy Solutions was the 20th stock car race of the 2017 NASCAR Camping World Truck Series, the fourth race of the 2017 NASCAR Camping World Truck Series playoffs, the first race of the Round of 6, and the 19th iteration of the event. The race was held on Saturday, October 28, 2017, in Martinsville, Virginia at Martinsville Speedway, a 0.526 miles (0.847 km) permanent oval-shaped short track. The race took the 200 laps to complete. On the final restart with 10 to go, Kyle Busch Motorsports driver Noah Gragson was able to pull away from the field to win his first career NASCAR Camping World Truck Series win and his only win of the season. To fill out the podium, Matt Crafton of ThorSport Racing and Johnny Sauter of GMS Racing would finish second and third, respectively.

== Background ==
Martinsville Speedway is a NASCAR-owned stock car racing track located in Henry County, in Ridgeway, Virginia, just to the south of Martinsville. At 0.526 miles (0.847 km) in length, it is the shortest track in the NASCAR Cup Series. The track was also one of the first paved oval tracks in NASCAR, being built in 1947 by H. Clay Earles. It is also the only remaining race track that has been on the NASCAR circuit from its beginning in 1948.

=== Entry list ===
- (R) denotes rookie driver.
- (i) denotes driver who is ineligible for series driver points.

#	Driver	Team	Make	Sponsor
1	Jordan Anderson	TJL Motorsports	Chevrolet	Bommarito Automotive Group, Carolion Children's
02	Austin Hill	Young's Motorsports	Ford	Outdoors International, Old Mexico Hunting
4	Christopher Bell	Kyle Busch Motorsports	Toyota	JBL
6	Norm Benning	Norm Benning Racing	Chevrolet	Norm Benning Racing
8	John Hunter Nemechek	NEMCO Motorsports	Chevrolet	Fire Alarm Services
10	Jennifer Jo Cobb	Jennifer Jo Cobb Racing	Chevrolet	Driven 2 Honor
13	Cody Coughlin (R)	ThorSport Racing	Toyota	JEGS
15	Gray Gaulding (i)	Premium Motorsports	Chevrolet	Premium Motorsports
16	Ryan Truex	Hattori Racing Enterprises	Toyota	Aisin
18	Noah Gragson (R)	Kyle Busch Motorsports	Toyota	Switch
19	Austin Cindric (R)	Brad Keselowski Racing	Ford	Fitzgerald Glider Kits
20	Jeb Burton (i)	Young's Motorsports	Chevrolet	State Water Heaters
21	Johnny Sauter	GMS Racing	Chevrolet	ISM Connect
24	Justin Haley (R)	GMS Racing	Chevrolet	Zeality
27	Ben Rhodes	ThorSport Racing	Toyota	Safelite AutoGlass
29	Chase Briscoe (R)	Brad Keselowski Racing	Ford	Cooper-Standard
33	Kaz Grala (R)	GMS Racing	Chevrolet	Charge Cords
44	Austin Wayne Self	Martins Motorsports	Chevrolet	AM Technical Solutions, Don't Mess with Texas
45	Jeffrey Abbey	Niece Motorsports	Chevrolet	Niece Motorsports
46	Todd Gilliland	Kyle Busch Motorsports	Toyota	Pedigree
49	Wendell Chavous (R)	Premium Motorsports	Chevrolet	Premium Motorsports
50	Bayley Currey	Beaver Motorsports	Chevrolet	Preferred Industrial Contractors, Inc.
51	Harrison Burton	Kyle Busch Motorsports	Toyota	DEX Imaging
52	Stewart Friesen (R)	Halmar Friesen Racing	Chevrolet	Halmar
57	Mike Senica	Norm Benning Racing	Chevrolet	Norm Benning Racing
63	Chris Windom	Copp Motorsports	Chevrolet	Baldwin Brothers Racing
83	Landon Huffman	Copp Motorsports	Chevrolet	Plan B Sales
86	Mason Diaz	Brandonbilt Motorsports	Chevrolet	Prince William Marina
87	Ty Dillon (i)	NEMCO Motorsports	Chevrolet	The Gracie Foundation
88	Matt Crafton	ThorSport Racing	Toyota	Menards, Ideal Door
92	Regan Smith	RBR Enterprises	Ford	BTS Tire & Wheel Distributors, Advance Auto Parts
98	Grant Enfinger (R)	ThorSport Racing	Toyota	RIDE TV
99	Cale Gale	MDM Motorsports	Chevrolet	Rheem
Official entry list

== Practice ==
=== First practice ===
The first practice session was held on Friday, October 27, at 1:00 PM EST. The session would last for 55 minutes. Matt Crafton of ThorSport Racing would set the fastest time in the session, with a lap of 20.129 and an average speed of 94.073 mph (151.396 km/h).

Pos.	#	Driver	Team	Make	Time	Speed
1	88	Matt Crafton	ThorSport Racing	Toyota	20.129	94.073
2	4	Christopher Bell	Kyle Busch Motorsports	Toyota	20.193	93.775
3	46	Todd Gilliland	Kyle Busch Motorsports	Toyota	20.198	93.752
Full first practice results

=== Second and final practice ===
The final practice session, sometimes known as Happy Hour, was held on Friday, October 27, at 3:00 PM EST. The session would last for 55 minutes. Stewart Friesen of Halmar Friesen Racing would set the fastest time in the session, with a lap of 19.993 and an average speed of 94.713 mph (152.426 km/h).

Pos.	#	Driver	Team	Make	Time	Speed
1	52	Stewart Friesen (R)	Halmar Friesen Racing	Chevrolet	19.993	94.713
2	51	Harrison Burton	Kyle Busch Motorsports	Toyota	20.133	94.055
3	21	Johnny Sauter	GMS Racing	Chevrolet	20.134	94.050
Full Happy Hour practice results

== Qualifying ==
Qualifying was held on Saturday, October 28, at 10:00 AM EST. Since Martinsville Speedway is less than 1.5 miles (2.4 km) in length, the qualifying system was a multi-car system that included three rounds. The first round was 15 minutes, where every driver would be able to set a lap within the 15 minutes. Then, the second round would consist of the fastest 24 cars in Round 1, and drivers would have 10 minutes to set a lap. Round 3 consisted of the fastest 12 drivers from Round 2, and the drivers would have 5 minutes to set a time. Whoever was fastest in Round 3 would win the pole.

Chase Briscoe of Brad Keselowski Racing would win the pole after advancing from both preliminary rounds and setting the fastest lap in Round 3, setting a time of 19.774 and an average speed of 95.762 miles per hour (154.114 km/h) in Round 3.

Mike Senica was the only driver to fail to qualify.

=== Full qualifying results ===
Pos.	#	Driver	Team	Make	Time (R1)	Speed (R1)	Time (R2)	Speed (R2)	Time (R3)	Speed (R3)
1	29	Chase Briscoe (R)	Brad Keselowski Racing	Ford	19.976	94.794	19.864	95.328	19.774	95.762
2	88	Matt Crafton	ThorSport Racing	Toyota	20.037	94.505	19.818	95.550	19.814	95.569
3	27	Ben Rhodes	ThorSport Racing	Toyota	20.021	94.581	19.815	95.564	19.825	95.516
4	21	Johnny Sauter	GMS Racing	Chevrolet	19.881	95.247	19.885	95.228	19.827	95.506
5	18	Noah Gragson (R)	Kyle Busch Motorsports	Toyota	19.988	94.737	19.831	95.487	19.848	95.405
6	19	Austin Cindric (R)	Brad Keselowski Racing	Ford	20.031	94.533	19.936	94.984	19.851	95.391
7	16	Ryan Truex	Hattori Racing Enterprises	Toyota	20.151	93.971	19.942	94.955	19.862	95.338
8	33	Kaz Grala (R)	GMS Racing	Chevrolet	19.985	94.751	19.936	94.984	19.884	95.232
9	86	Mason Diaz	Brandonbilt Motorsports	Chevrolet	19.971	94.817	19.909	95.113	19.925	95.036
10	51	Harrison Burton	Kyle Busch Motorsports	Toyota	20.017	94.600	19.817	95.554	19.933	94.998
11	52	Stewart Friesen (R)	Halmar Friesen Racing	Chevrolet	20.199	93.747	19.959	94.874	20.046	94.463
12	15	Gray Gaulding (i)	Premium Motorsports	Chevrolet	20.045	94.467	19.971	94.817	20.082	94.293
Eliminated in Round 2
13	46	Todd Gilliland	Kyle Busch Motorsports	Toyota	20.112	94.153	19.984	94.756	-	-
14	99	Cale Gale	MDM Motorsports	Chevrolet	20.115	94.139	20.000	94.680	-	-
15	4	Christopher Bell	Kyle Busch Motorsports	Toyota	19.899	95.161	20.007	94.647	-	-
16	98	Grant Enfinger (R)	ThorSport Racing	Toyota	20.192	93.780	20.009	94.637	-	-
17	8	John Hunter Nemechek	NEMCO Motorsports	Chevrolet	20.182	93.826	20.011	94.628	-	-
18	87	Ty Dillon (i)	NEMCO Motorsports	Chevrolet	19.972	94.813	20.015	94.609	-	-
19	24	Justin Haley (R)	GMS Racing	Chevrolet	20.129	94.073	20.028	94.548	-	-
20	13	Cody Coughlin (R)	ThorSport Racing	Toyota	20.211	93.692	20.053	94.430	-	-
21	20	Jeb Burton (i)	Young's Motorsports	Chevrolet	20.096	94.228	20.064	94.378	-	-
22	92	Regan Smith	RBR Enterprises	Ford	20.145	93.999	20.076	94.322	-	-
23	02	Austin Hill	Young's Motorsports	Ford	20.163	93.915	20.171	93.877	-	-
24	83	Landon Huffman	Copp Motorsports	Chevrolet	20.270	93.419	20.210	93.696	-	-
Eliminated in Round 1
25	44	Austin Wayne Self	Martins Motorsports	Chevrolet	20.274	93.400	-	-	-	-
26	45	Jeffrey Abbey	Niece Motorsports	Chevrolet	20.435	92.665	-	-	-	-
27	50	Bayley Currey	Beaver Motorsports	Chevrolet	20.589	91.971	-	-	-	-
Qualified by owner's points
28	1	Jordan Anderson	TJL Motorsports	Chevrolet	20.598	91.931	-	-	-	-
29	49	Wendell Chavous (R)	Premium Motorsports	Chevrolet	20.790	91.082	-	-	-	-
30	10	Jennifer Jo Cobb	Jennifer Jo Cobb Racing	Chevrolet	21.133	89.604	-	-	-	-
31	6	Norm Benning	Norm Benning Racing	Chevrolet	22.005	86.053	-	-	-	-
32	63	Chris Windom	MB Motorsports	Chevrolet	29.094	65.086	-	-	-	-
Failed to qualify
33	57	Mike Senica	Norm Benning Racing	Chevrolet	24.875	76.125	-	-	-	-
Official qualifying results
Official starting lineup

== Race results ==
Stage 1 Laps: 50

Pos.	#	Driver	Team	Make	Pts
1	88	Matt Crafton	ThorSport Racing	Toyota	10
2	21	Johnny Sauter	GMS Racing	Chevrolet	9
3	27	Ben Rhodes	ThorSport Racing	Toyota	8
4	16	Ryan Truex	Hattori Racing Enterprises	Toyota	7
5	18	Noah Gragson (R)	Kyle Busch Motorsports	Toyota	6
6	33	Kaz Grala (R)	GMS Racing	Chevrolet	5
7	19	Austin Cindric (R)	Brad Keselowski Racing	Ford	4
8	86	Mason Diaz	Brandonbilt Motorsports	Chevrolet	3
9	29	Chase Briscoe (R)	Brad Keselowski Racing	Ford	2
10	51	Harrison Burton	Kyle Busch Motorsports	Toyota	1

Stage 2 Laps: 50

Pos.	#	Driver	Team	Make	Pts
1	21	Johnny Sauter	GMS Racing	Chevrolet	10
2	88	Matt Crafton	ThorSport Racing	Toyota	9
3	18	Noah Gragson (R)	Kyle Busch Motorsports	Toyota	8
4	4	Christopher Bell	Kyle Busch Motorsports	Toyota	7
5	29	Chase Briscoe (R)	Brad Keselowski Racing	Ford	6
6	51	Harrison Burton	Kyle Busch Motorsports	Toyota	5
7	46	Todd Gilliland	Kyle Busch Motorsports	Toyota	4
8	24	Justin Haley (R)	GMS Racing	Chevrolet	3
9	52	Stewart Friesen (R)	Halmar Friesen Racing	Chevrolet	2
10	99	Cale Gale	MDM Motorsports	Chevrolet	1

Stage 3 Laps: 100

Fin	St	#	Driver	Team	Make	Laps	Led	Status	Pts
1	5	18	Noah Gragson (R)	Kyle Busch Motorsports	Toyota	200	10	running	54
2	2	88	Matt Crafton	ThorSport Racing	Toyota	200	102	running	54
3	4	21	Johnny Sauter	GMS Racing	Chevrolet	200	33	running	53
4	10	51	Harrison Burton	Kyle Busch Motorsports	Toyota	200	0	running	39
5	13	46	Todd Gilliland	Kyle Busch Motorsports	Toyota	200	0	running	36
6	11	52	Stewart Friesen (R)	Halmar Friesen Racing	Chevrolet	200	0	running	33
7	8	33	Kaz Grala (R)	GMS Racing	Chevrolet	200	0	running	35
8	15	4	Christopher Bell	Kyle Busch Motorsports	Toyota	200	16	running	36
9	3	27	Ben Rhodes	ThorSport Racing	Toyota	200	0	running	36
10	6	19	Austin Cindric (R)	Brad Keselowski Racing	Ford	200	0	running	31
11	19	24	Justin Haley (R)	GMS Racing	Chevrolet	200	0	running	29
12	16	98	Grant Enfinger (R)	ThorSport Racing	Toyota	200	0	running	25
13	7	16	Ryan Truex	Hattori Racing Enterprises	Toyota	200	0	running	31
14	22	92	Regan Smith	RBR Enterprises	Ford	200	0	running	23
15	18	87	Ty Dillon (i)	NEMCO Motorsports	Chevrolet	200	0	running	0
16	23	02	Austin Hill	Young's Motorsports	Ford	200	0	running	21
17	24	83	Landon Huffman	Copp Motorsports	Chevrolet	200	0	running	20
18	14	99	Cale Gale	MDM Motorsports	Chevrolet	200	0	running	20
19	1	29	Chase Briscoe (R)	Brad Keselowski Racing	Ford	199	39	running	26
20	20	13	Cody Coughlin (R)	ThorSport Racing	Toyota	199	0	running	17
21	29	49	Wendell Chavous (R)	Premium Motorsports	Chevrolet	199	0	running	16
22	26	45	Jeffrey Abbey	Niece Motorsports	Chevrolet	199	0	running	15
23	9	86	Mason Diaz	Brandonbilt Motorsports	Chevrolet	198	0	running	17
24	28	1	Jordan Anderson	TJL Motorsports	Chevrolet	198	0	running	13
25	27	50	Bayley Currey	Beaver Motorsports	Chevrolet	196	0	running	12
26	21	20	Jeb Burton (i)	Young's Motorsports	Chevrolet	174	0	rear gear	0
27	31	6	Norm Benning	Norm Benning Racing	Chevrolet	153	0	brakes	10
28	30	10	Jennifer Jo Cobb	Jennifer Jo Cobb Racing	Chevrolet	108	0	oil line	9
29	25	44	Austin Wayne Self	Martins Motorsports	Chevrolet	61	0	engine	8
30	17	8	John Hunter Nemechek	NEMCO Motorsports	Chevrolet	37	0	crash	7
31	12	15	Gray Gaulding (i)	Premium Motorsports	Chevrolet	26	0	electrical	0
32	32	63	Chris Windom	MB Motorsports	Chevrolet	0	0	engine	5
Failed to qualify
33		57	Mike Senica	Norm Benning Racing	Chevrolet				
Official race results

== Standings after the race ==
Drivers' Championship standings

Pos	Driver	Points
1	Christopher Bell	3,083
2	Johnny Sauter	3,080 (-3)
3	Matt Crafton	3,068 (–15)
4	Ben Rhodes	3,049 (–31)
5	Austin Cindric	3,038 (–45)
6	John Hunter Nemechek	3,021 (–62)
7	Chase Briscoe	2,125 (–958)
8	Kaz Grala	2,117 (–966)
Official driver's standings

- Note: Only the first 8 positions are included for the driver standings.

Previous race: 2017 Fred's 250	NASCAR Camping World Truck Series; 2017 season	Next race: 2017 JAG Metals 350
