= 2018 Eldora Dirt Derby =

Race details
- Race 13 of 23 in the 2018 NASCAR Camping World Truck Series season
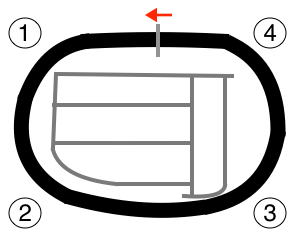
- Date: July 18, 2018
- Location: Eldora Speedway in Rossburg, Ohio
- Course: Permanent racing facility
- Course length: .500 miles (.804 km)
- Distance: 153 laps, 76.5 mi (123.1 km)
- Average speed: 46.131 miles per hour (74.241 km/h)

Pole position
Driver	Ben Rhodes	ThorSport Racing

Most laps led
Driver	Chase Briscoe	ThorSport Racing
- Laps: 54

Winner
No. 27	Chase Briscoe	ThorSport Racing

Television in the United States
- Network: FS1
- Announcers: Vince Welch; Michael Waltrip; Kyle Larson

Radio in the United States
- Radio: PRN

The 2018 Eldora Dirt Derby was a NASCAR Camping World Truck Series race held on July 18, 2018 at Eldora Speedway in Rossburg, Ohio. Contested over 153 laps due to an overtime finish on the 0.500-mile (0.805 km) dirt track, it was the 13th race of the 2018 NASCAR Camping World Truck Series season.

== Entry list ==
No.	Driver	Team	Manufacturer
0	Ray Ciccarelli	Jennifer Jo Cobb Racing	Chevrolet
02	Austin Hill	Young's Motorsports	Chevrolet
03	John Provenzano	Mike Affarano Motorsports	Chevrolet
2	Cody Coughlin	GMS Racing	Chevrolet
3	Ryan Newman (i)	Jordan Anderson Racing	Chevrolet
4	Todd Gilliland (R)	Kyle Busch Motorsports	Toyota
6	Norm Benning	Norm Benning Racing	Chevrolet
8	John Hunter Nemechek (i)	NEMCO Motorsports	Chevrolet
10	Jennifer Jo Cobb	Jennifer Jo Cobb Racing	Chevrolet
12	Ty Dillon	Young's Motorsports	Chevrolet
13	Myatt Snider (R)	ThorSport Racing	Ford
15	J. R. Heffner	Premium Motorsports	Chevrolet
16	Brett Moffitt	Hattori Racing Enterprises	Toyota
17	Tyler Dippel	DGR-Crosley	Toyota
18	Noah Gragson	Kyle Busch Motorsports	Toyota
20	Tanner Thorson	Young's Motorsports	Chevrolet
21	Johnny Sauter	GMS Racing	Chevrolet
22	Austin Wayne Self	Niece Motorsports	Chevrolet
24	Justin Haley	GMS Racing	Chevrolet
25	Dalton Sargeant (R)	GMS Racing	Chevrolet
27	Chase Briscoe (i)	ThorSport Racing	Ford
33	Braden Mitchell	Reaume Brothers Racing	Toyota
34	Jeffrey Abbey	Reaume Brothers Racing	Chevrolet
38	Max McLaughlin	Niece Motorsports	Chevrolet
41	Ben Rhodes	ThorSport Racing	Ford
45	Justin Fontaine (R)	Niece Motorsports	Chevrolet
49	Wendell Chavous	Premium Motorsports	Chevrolet
50	Mike Harmon (i)	Beaver Motorsports	Chevrolet
51	Logan Seavey	Kyle Busch Motorsports	Toyota
52	Stewart Friesen	Halmar Friesen Racing	Chevrolet
54	Chris Windom	DGR-Crosley	Toyota
63	Kyle Strickler	MB Motorsports	Chevrolet
74	Trevor Collins	Mike Harmon Racing	Chevrolet
80	Justin Shipley	Jacob Wallace Racing	Ford
83	Nick Hoffman	MB Motorsports	Chevrolet
88	Matt Crafton	ThorSport Racing	Ford
97	R. J. Otto Jr.	JJL Motorsports	Ford
98	Grant Enfinger	ThorSport Racing	Ford
99	Sheldon Creed	MDM Motorsports	Chevrolet

== Qualifying ==
Pos.	No.	Driver	Team	Manufacturer	Time	Speed
1	41	Ben Rhodes	ThorSport Racing	Ford	20.737	86.801
2	51	Logan Seavey	Kyle Busch Motorsports	Toyota	20.750	86.747
3	17	Tyler Dippel	DGR-Crosley	Toyota	20.841	86.368
4	98	Grant Enfinger	ThorSport Racing	Ford	20.895	86.145
5	52	Stewart Friesen	Halmar Friesen Racing	Chevrolet	20.931	85.997
6	99	Sheldon Creed	MDM Motorsports	Chevrolet	20.968	85.845
7	4	Todd Gilliland (R)	Kyle Busch Motorsports	Toyota	21.036	85.568
8	54	Chris Windom	DGR-Crosey	Toyota	21.039	85.555
9	88	Matt Crafton	ThorSport Racing	Ford	21.053	85.499
10	3	Ryan Newman (i)	Jordan Anderson Racing	Chevrolet	21.108	85.276
11	22	Austin Wayne Self	Niece Motorsports	Chevrolet	21.164	85.050
12	16	Brett Moffitt	Hattori Racing Enterprises	Toyota	21.219	84.830
13	18	Noah Gragson	Kyle Busch Motorsports	Toyota	21.242	84.738
14	74	Trevor Collins	Mike Harmon Racing	Chevrolet	21.253	84.694
15	13	Myatt Snider (R)	ThorSport Racing	Ford	21.263	84.654
16	8	John Hunter Nemechek (i)	NEMCO Motorsports	Chevrolet	21.293	84.535
17	25	Dalton Sargeant (R)	GMS Racing	Chevrolet	21.370	84.230
18	27	Chase Briscoe (i)	ThorSport Racing	Ford	21.393	84.140
19	83	Nick Hoffman	MB Motorsports	Chevrolet	21.399	84.116
20	45	Justin Fontaine (R)	Niece Motorsports	Chevrolet	21.453	83.904
21	80	Justin Shipley	Jacob Wallace Racing	Ford	21.523	83.631
22	38	Max McLaughlin	Niece Motorsports	Chevrolet	21.551	83.523
23	63	Kyle Strickler	MB Motorsports	Chevrolet	21.613	83.283
24	2	Cody Coughlin	GMS Racing	Chevrolet	21.618	83.264
25	15	J. R. Heffner	Premium Motorsports	Chevrolet	21.633	83.206
26	02	Austin Hill	Young's Motorsports	Chevrolet	21.642	83.172
27	12	Ty Dillon	Young's Motorsports	Chevrolet	21.643	83.168
28	6	Norm Benning	Norm Benning Racing	Chevrolet	21.648	83.149
29	24	Justin Haley	GMS Racing	Chevrolet	21.699	82.953
30	34	Jeffrey Abbey	Reaume Brothers Racing	Chevrolet	21.798	82.576
31	33	Braden Mitchell	Reaume Brothers Racing	Toyota	21.933	82.068
32	97	R. J. Otto Jr.	JJL Motorsports	Ford	21.954	81.990
33	49	Wendell Chavous	Premium Motorsports	Chevrolet	21.973	81.919
34	21	Johnny Sauter	GMS Racing	Chevrolet	21.976	81.908
35	03	John Provenzano	Mike Affarano Motorsports	Chevrolet	22.046	81.647
36	0	Ray Ciccarelli	Jennifer Jo Cobb Racing	Chevrolet	22.067	81.570
37	20	Tanner Thorson	Young's Motorsports	Chevrolet	22.113	81.400
38	10	Jennifer Jo Cobb	Jennifer Jo Cobb Racing	Chevrolet	22.554	79.808
39	50	Mike Harmon (i)	Beaver Motorsports	Chevrolet	22.565	79.770
Withdrew
WD	46	N/A	Kyle Busch Motorsports	Toyota	—	—

== Qualifying heat races ==
Drivers will be split into five different heat races, all 10 laps, and their finish will determine the starting lineup. Drivers who finish in the top 5 in each heat will advance into the main event. The remaining drivers will compete in the "last chance" qualifier race, which will be 15 laps, and whoever finishes in the top 5, advances.

=== Heat 1 ===
Fin.	St.	#	Driver	Team	Make	Laps	Led	Status
1	1	41	Ben Rhodes	ThorSport Racing	Ford	10	7	running
2	2	99	Sheldon Creed	MDM Motorsports	Chevrolet	10	0	running
3	3	2	Austin Wayne Self	Niece Motorsports	Chevrolet	10	3	running
4	5	80	Justin Shipley	Jacob Wallace Racing	Ford	10	0	running
5	6	02	Austin Hill	Young's Motorsports	Chevrolet	10	0	running
6	4	8	John Hunter Nemechek (i)	NEMCO Motorsports	Chevrolet	10	0	running
7	7	33	Braden Mitchell	Reaume Brothers Racing	Toyota	10	0	running
8	8	0	Ray Ciccarelli	Jennifer Jo Cobb Racing	Chevrolet	9	0	running

=== Heat 2 ===
Fin.	St.	#	Driver	Team	Make	Laps	Led	Status
1	2	4	Todd Gilliland (R)	Kyle Busch Motorsports	Toyota	10	3	running
2	1	51	Logan Seavey	Kyle Busch Motorsports	Toyota	10	7	running
3	3	16	Brett Moffitt	Hattori Racing Enterprises	Toyota	10	0	running
4	5	38	Max McLaughlin	Niece Motorsports	Chevrolet	10	0	running
5	6	12	Ty Dillon	Young's Motorsports	Chevrolet	10	0	running
6	7	97	R. J. Otto Jr.	JJL Motorsports	Ford	10	0	running
7	4	25	Dalton Sargeant	GMS Racing	Chevrolet	10	0	running
8	8	20	Tanner Thorson	Young's Motorsports	Chevrolet	9	0	running

=== Heat 3 ===
Fin.	St.	#	Driver	Team	Make	Laps	Led	Status
1	4	27	Chase Briscoe (i)	ThorSport Racing	Ford	10	9	running
2	2	54	Chris Windom	DGR-Crosley	Toyota	10	0	running
3	1	17	Tyler Dippel	DGR-Crosley	Toyota	10	1	running
4	6	6	Norm Benning	Norm Benning Racing	Chevrolet	10	0	running
5	5	63	Kyle Strickler	MB Motorsports	Chevrolet	10	0	running
6	3	18	Noah Gragson	Kyle Busch Motorsports	Toyota	10	0	running
7	7	49	Wendell Chavous	Premium Motorsports	Chevrolet	10	0	running
8	8	10	Jennifer Jo Cobb	Jennifer Jo Cobb Racing	Chevrolet	10	0	running

=== Heat 4 ===
Fin.	St.	#	Driver	Team	Make	Laps	Led	Status
1	2	88	Matt Crafton	ThorSport Racing	Ford	10	10	running
2	1	98	Grant Enfinger	ThorSport Racing	Ford	10	0	running
3	4	83	Nick Hoffman	MB Motorsports	Chevrolet	10	0	running
4	6	24	Justin Haley	GMS Racing	Chevrolet	10	0	running
5	5	2	Cody Coughlin	GMS Racing	Chevrolet	10	0	running
6	7	21	Johnny Sauter	GMS Racing	Chevrolet	10	0	running
7	8	50	Mike Harmon (i)	Beaver Motorsports	Chevrolet	10	0	running
8	3	74	Trevor Collins	Mike Harmon Racing	Chevrolet	10	0	running

=== Heat 5 ===
Fin.	St.	#	Driver	Team	Make	Laps	Led	Status
1	1	52	Stewart Friesen	Halmar Friesen Racing	Chevrolet	10	10	running
2	2	3	Ryan Newman (i)	Jordan Anderson Racing	Chevrolet	10	0	running
3	3	13	Myatt Snider (R)	ThorSport Racing	Ford	10	0	running
4	5	15	J. R. Heffner	Premium Motorsports	Chevrolet	10	0	running
5	6	34	Jeffrey Abbey	Reaume Brothers Racing	Chevrolet	10	0	running
6	4	45	Justin Fontaine (R)	Niece Motorsports	Chevrolet	10	0	running
7	7	03	John Provenzano	Mike Affarano Motorsports	Chevrolet	2	0	mechanical

=== "Last chance" qualifier ===
Fin.	St.	#	Driver	Team	Make	Laps	Led	Status
1	1	8	John Hunter Nemechek (i)	NEMCO Motorsports	Chevrolet	15	11	running
2	3	18	Noah Gragson	Kyle Busch Motorsports	Toyota	15	4	running
3	12	20	Tanner Thorson	Young's Motorsports	Chevrolet	15	0	running
4	4	21	Johnny Sauter	GMS Racing	Chevrolet	15	0	running
5	5	45	Justin Fontaine (R)	Niece Motorsports	Chevrolet	15	0	running
6	8	49	Wendell Chavous	Premium Motorsports	Chevrolet	15	0	running
7	7	25	Dalton Sargeant (R)	GMS Racing	Chevrolet	15	0	running
8	6	33	Braden Mitchell	Reaume Brothers Racing	Toyota	15	0	running
9	13	10	Jennifer Jo Cobb	Jennifer Jo Cobb Racing	Chevrolet	15	0	running
10	14	74	Trevor Collins	Mike Harmon Racing	Chevrolet	15	0	running
11	2	97	R. J. Otto Jr.	JJL Motorsports	Ford	13	0	dnf
12	11	0	Ray Ciccarelli	Jennifer Jo Cobb Racing	Chevrolet	8	0	dnf
13	9	50	Mike Harmon (i)	Beaver Motorsports	Chevrolet	3	0	dnf
14	10	03	John Provenzano	Mike Affarano Motorsports	Chevrolet	0	0	did not start

== Starting lineup ==
Grid	No.	Driver	Team	Manufacturer
1	41	Ben Rhodes	ThorSport Racing	Ford
2	4	Todd Gilliland (R)	Kyle Busch Motorsports	Toyota
3	27	Chase Briscoe	ThorSport Racing	Ford
4	88	Matt Crafton	ThorSport Racing	Ford
5	52	Stewart Friesen	Halmar Friesen Motorsports	Chevrolet
6	99	Sheldon Creed	MDM Motorsports	Chevrolet
7	51	Logan Seavey	Kyle Busch Motorsports	Toyota
8	54	Chris Windom	DGR-Crosley	Toyota
9	98	Grant Enfinger	ThorSport Racing	Ford
10	3	Ryan Newman (i)	Jordan Anderson Racing	Chevrolet
11	22	Austin Wayne Self	Niece Motorsports	Chevrolet
12	16	Brett Moffitt	Hattori Racing Enterprises	Toyota
13	17	Tyler Dippel	DGR-Crosley	Toyota
14	83	Nick Hoffman	MB Motorsports	Chevrolet
15	13	Myatt Snider (R)	ThorSport Racing	Ford
16	80	Justin Shipley	Jacob Wallace Racing	Ford
17	38	Max McLaughlin	Niece Motorsports	Chevrolet
18	6	Norm Benning	Norm Benning Racing	Chevrolet
19	24	Justin Haley	GMS Racing	Chevrolet
20	15	J. R. Heffner	Premium Motorsports	Chevrolet
21	02	Austin Hill	Young's Motorsports	Chevrolet
22	12	Ty Dillon	Young's Motorsports	Chevrolet
23	63	Kyle Strickler	MB Motorsports	Chevrolet
24	2	Cody Coughlin	GMS Racing	Chevrolet
25	34	Jeffrey Abbey	Reaume Brothers Racing	Chevrolet
26	8	John Hunter Nemechek (i)	NEMCO Motorsports	Chevrolet
27	18	Noah Gragson	Kyle Busch Motorsports	Toyota
28	20	Tanner Thorson	Young's Motorsports	Chevrolet
29	21	Johnny Sauter	GMS Racing	Chevrolet
30	45	Justin Fontaine (R)	Niece Motorsports	Chevrolet
31	49	Wendell Chavous*	Premium Motorsports	Chevrolet
32	25	Dalton Sargeant (R)	GMS Racing	Chevrolet
Failed to Qualify
33	33	Braden Mitchell	Reaume Brothers Racing	Toyota
34	10	Jennifer Jo Cobb	Jennifer Jo Cobb Racing	Chevrolet
35	74	Trevor Collins	Mike Harmon Racing	Chevrolet
36	97	R. J. Otto Jr.	JJL Motorsports	Ford
37	0	Ray Ciccarelli	Jennifer Jo Cobb Racing	Chevrolet
38	50	Mike Harmon	Beaver Motorsports	Chevrolet
39	03	John Provenzano	Mike Affarano Motorsports	Chevrolet

* – Wendell Chavous started at the rear of the field due to unapproved adjustments.

== Race ==
=== Stage Results ===
Stage 1

Pos	No	Driver	Team	Manufacturer	Points
1	41	Ben Rhodes	ThorSport Racing	Ford	10
2	51	Logan Seavey	Kyle Busch Motorsports	Toyota	9
3	27	Chase Briscoe (i)	ThorSport Racing	Ford	0
4	54	Chris Windom	DGR-Crosley	Toyota	7
5	17	Tyler Dippel	DGR-Crosley	Toyota	6
6	8	John Hunter Nemechek (i)	NEMCO Motorsports	Chevrolet	0
7	98	Grant Enfinger	ThorSport Racing	Ford	4
8	88	Matt Crafton	ThorSport Racing	Ford	3
9	3	Ryan Newman (i)	Jordan Anderson Racing	Chevrolet	0
10	22	Austin Wayne Self	Niece Motorsports	Chevrolet	1

Stage 2

Pos	No	Driver	Team	Manufacturer	Points
1	27	Chase Briscoe (i)	ThorSport Racing	Ford	0
2	98	Grant Enfinger	ThorSport Racing	Ford	9
3	51	Logan Seavey	Kyle Busch Motorsports	Toyota	8
4	22	Austin Wayne Self	Niece Motorsports	Chevrolet	7
5	54	Chris Windom	DGR-Crosley	Toyota	6
6	4	Todd Gilliland (R)	Kyle Busch Motorsports	Toyota	5
7	88	Matt Crafton	ThorSport Racing	Ford	4
8	13	Myatt Snider (R)	ThorSport Racing	Ford	3
9	02	Austin Hill	Young's Motorsports	Chevrolet	2
10	52	Stewart Friesen	Halmar Friesen Racing	Chevrolet	1

=== Final Stage Results ===
Stage 3

Pos	Grid	No	Driver	Team	Manufacturer	Laps	Points
1	3	27	Chase Briscoe (i)	ThorSport Racing	Ford	153	0
2	9	98	Grant Enfinger	ThorSport Racing	Ford	153	48
3	5	52	Stewart Friesen	Halmar Friesen Racing	Chevrolet	153	35
4	4	88	Matt Crafton	ThorSport Racing	Ford	153	40
5	12	16	Brett Moffitt	Hattori Racing Enterprises	Toyota	153	32
6	27	18	Noah Gragson	Kyle Busch Motorsports	Toyota	153	31
7	26	8	John Hunter Nemechek (i)	NEMCO Motorsports	Chevrolet	153	0
8	7	51	Logan Seavey	Kyle Busch Motorsports	Toyota	153	46
9	19	24	Justin Haley	GMS Racing	Chevrolet	153	28
10	14	83	Nick Hoffman	MB Motorsports	Chevrolet	153	27
11	22	12	Ty Dillon (i)	Young's Motorsports	Chevrolet	153	0
12	17	38	Max McLaughlin	Niece Motorsports	Chevrolet	153	25
13	13	17	Tyler Dippel	DGR-Crosley	Toyota	153	30
14	8	54	Chris Windom	DGR-Crosley	Toyota	153	36
15	6	99	Sheldon Creed	MDM Motorsports	Chevrolet	153	22
16	29	21	Johnny Sauter	GMS Racing	Chevrolet	153	21
17	25	34	Jeffrey Abbey	Reaume Brothers Racing	Chevrolet	153	20
18	11	22	Austin Wayne Self	Niece Motorsports	Chevrolet	153	27
19	28	20	Tanner Thorson	Young's Motorsports	Chevrolet	153	18
20	15	13	Myatt Snider (R)	ThorSport Racing	Ford	153	20
21	21	02	Austin Hill	Young's Motorsports	Chevrolet	153	18
22	2	4	Todd Gilliland (R)	Kyle Busch Motorsports	Toyota	153	20
23	31	49	Wendell Chavous	Premium Motorsports	Chevrolet	153	14
24	20	15	J. R. Heffner	Premium Motorsports	Chevrolet	152	13
25	30	45	Justin Fontaine (R)	Niece Motorsports	Chevrolet	152	12
26	16	80	Justin Shipley	Jacob Wallace Racing	Ford	151	11
27	32	25	Dalton Sargeant (R)	GMS Racing	Chevrolet	151	10
28	24	2	Cody Coughlin	GMS Racing	Chevrolet	150	9
29	1	41	Ben Rhodes	ThorSport Racing	Ford	150	18
30	10	3	Ryan Newman (i)	Jordan Anderson Racing	Chevrolet	149	0
31	23	63	Kyle Strickler	MB Motorsports	Chevrolet	145	6
32	18	6	Norm Benning	Norm Benning Racing	Chevrolet	144	5
