= Max Johnston (racing driver) =

Australian racing driver (born 1993)

- Born: 24 September 1993 (age 33); Razorback, New South Wales, Australia

NASCAR FedEx Freight Truck Series career
- 1 race run over 1 year
- 2017 position: 73rd
- Best finish: 73rd (2017)
- First race: 2017 Eldora Dirt Derby (Eldora)
Wins	Top tens	Poles
0	0	0

Max Johnston (born 24 September 1993) is an Australian professional stock car racing driver. He last competed part-time in the NASCAR Camping World Truck Series, driving the No. 02 for Young's Motorsports.

== Biography ==
A sprint car racing driver, Johnston made his NASCAR debut for Young's at Eldora Speedway in 2017. In an interview with Motorsport.com, he revealed the opportunity arose after messaging the owner of sponsor Brandt Agriculture on Facebook. He finished 29th in the Eldora Dirt Derby after being involved in a wreck with Korbin Forrister and Ben Rhodes.

Johnston is an alumnus of Magdalene Catholic High School.

== Motorsports career results ==
=== NASCAR ===
(key) (Bold – Pole position awarded by qualifying time. Italics – Pole position earned by points standings or practice time. * – Most laps led.)

==== Camping World Truck Series ====
NASCAR Camping World Truck Series results
Year	Team	No.	Make	1	2	3	4	5	6	7	8	9	10	11	12	13	14	15	16	17	18	19	20	21	22	23	NCWTC	Pts	Ref
2017	Young's Motorsports	02	Chevy	DAY	ATL	MAR	KAN	CLT	DOV	TEX	GTW	IOW	KEN	ELD; 29	POC	MCH	BRI	MSP	CHI	NHA	LVS	TAL	MAR	TEX	PHO	HOM	73rd	8	
