= Jeffrey Abbey =

American racing driver (born 1998)

- Born: Jeffrey L. Abbey; September 1, 1998 (age 28); Comanche, Texas, U.S.
- Achievements: 2016 IMCA Southern Sport Modified National Champion; 2016 Brian Mize Memorial Champion; 2016 Boone Speedway IMCA Supernationals Champion; 2016 Abilene Speedway Southern Challenge Champion; 2015, 2016 Texas State Champion; 2015, 2016 Boyd Raceway Track Champion

NASCAR FedEx Freight Truck Series career
- 4 races run over 3 years
- 2019 position: 78th
- Best finish: 48th (2017)
- First race: 2017 Eldora Dirt Derby (Eldora)
- Last race: 2019 Eldora Dirt Derby (Eldora)
Wins	Top tens	Poles
0	0	0
- Statistics up to date as of November 18, 2019.

Jeffrey L. Abbey (born September 1, 1998) is an American professional dirt track and stock car racing driver. He last competed part-time in the NASCAR Gander Outdoors Truck Series, driving the No. 44 Chevrolet Silverado for Niece Motorsports.

== Racing career ==
Abbey initially began his racing career driving go-karts at the age of six. He later competed in the International Motor Contest Association's Southern Sport Modifieds, winning the national championship in 2016.

=== Gander Outdoors Truck Series ===
Abbey made his NASCAR debut in 2017, driving the No. 45 Chevrolet Silverado for Niece Motorsports at Eldora. He started sixteenth and finished fourteenth. Abbey returned to the truck at the second Martinsville race, where he started 26th and finished 22nd.

Abbey returned to the series at the 2018 Eldora Dirt Derby, driving the No. 34 Chevrolet Silverado for Reaume Brothers Racing. He started 25th and finished 17th.

== Personal life ==
Abbey studied engineering at Texas A&M University.

== Motorsports career results ==
=== NASCAR ===
(key) (Bold – Pole position awarded by qualifying time. Italics – Pole position earned by points standings or practice time. * – Most laps led.)

==== Gander Outdoors Truck Series ====
NASCAR Gander Outdoors Truck Series results
Year	Team	No.	Make	1	2	3	4	5	6	7	8	9	10	11	12	13	14	15	16	17	18	19	20	21	22	23	NGOTC	Pts	Ref
2017	Niece Motorsports	45	Chevy	DAY	ATL	MAR	KAN	CLT	DOV	TEX	GTW	IOW	KEN	ELD; 14	POC	MCH	BRI	MSP	CHI	NHA	LVS	TAL	MAR; 22	TEX	PHO	HOM	48th	38	
2018	Reaume Brothers Racing	34	Chevy	DAY	ATL	LVS	MAR	DOV	KAN	CLT	TEX	IOW	GTW	CHI	KEN	ELD; 17	POC	MCH	BRI	MSP	LVS	TAL	MAR	TEX	PHO	HOM	70th	20	
2019	Niece Motorsports	44	Chevy	DAY	ATL	LVS	MAR	TEX	DOV	KAN	CLT	TEX	IOW	GTW	CHI	KEN	POC	ELD; 20	MCH	BRI	MSP	LVS	TAL	MAR	PHO	HOM	78th	17	
