= Justin Shipley =

American racing driver (born 1980)

- Born: Justin H. Shipley; June 5, 1980 (age 46); Douglasville, Georgia, U.S.

NASCAR FedEx Freight Truck Series career
- 4 races run over 4 years
- 2019 position: 65th
- Best finish: 65th (2017, 2019)
- First race: 2016 Aspen Dental Eldora Dirt Derby (Eldora)
- Last race: 2019 Eldora Dirt Derby (Eldora)
Wins	Top tens	Poles
0	0	0
- Statistics up to date as of November 18, 2019.

Justin H. Shipley (born June 5, 1980) is an American professional stock car racing driver. He last competed part-time in the NASCAR Gander Outdoors Truck Series, driving the No. 80 Ford F-150 for Jacob Wallace Racing.

== Racing career ==
=== Gander Outdoors Truck Series ===
Shipley began his NASCAR career in 2016, driving the No. 80 Ford F-150 for Jacob Wallace Racing at the Eldora Dirt Derby. He started 13th but finished 31st due to his engine overheating. In the following two years, Shipley has raced at both Eldora Dirt Derbys, driving the same truck.

In 2017, Shipley started 21st and finished 25th due to engine problems.

In 2018, Shipley started 16th and finished 26th, two laps down.

In 2019, Shipley started 14th and finished 11th, his best career finish in the Truck Series.

== Motorsports career results ==
=== NASCAR ===
(key) (Bold – Pole position awarded by qualifying time. Italics – Pole position earned by points standings or practice time. * – Most laps led.)

==== Gander Outdoors Truck Series ====
NASCAR Gander Outdoors Truck Series results
Year	Team	No.	Make	1	2	3	4	5	6	7	8	9	10	11	12	13	14	15	16	17	18	19	20	21	22	23	NGOTC	Pts	Ref
2016	Jacob Wallace Racing	80	Ford	DAY	ATL	MAR	KAN	DOV	CLT	TEX	IOW	GTW	KEN	ELD; 31	POC	BRI	MCH	MSP	CHI	NHA	LVS	TAL	MAR	TEX	PHO	HOM	73rd	1	
2017	Jacob Wallace Racing	80	Ford	DAY	ATL	MAR	KAN	CLT	DOV	TEX	GTW	IOW	KEN	ELD; 25	POC	MCH	BRI	MSP	CHI	NHA	LVS	TAL	MAR	TEX	PHO	HOM	65th	17	
2018	Jacob Wallace Racing	80	Ford	DAY	ATL	LVS	MAR	DOV	KAN	CLT	TEX	IOW	GTW	CHI	KEN	ELD; 26	POC	MCH	BRI	MSP	LVS	TAL	MAR	TEX	PHO	HOM	80th	11	
2019	Jacob Wallace Racing	80	Ford	DAY	ATL	LVS	MAR	TEX	DOV	KAN	CLT	TEX	IOW	GTW	CHI	KEN	POC	ELD; 11	MCH	BRI	MSP	LVS	TAL	MAR	PHO	HOM	65th	26	

^{*} Season still in progress
^{1} Ineligible for series points
