= 2017 Chevrolet Silverado 250 =

15th race of the 2017 NASCAR Camping World Truck Series

Race details
- Race 15 of 23 of the 2017 NASCAR Camping World Truck Series
- Date: September 3, 2017
- Official name: 5th Annual Chevrolet Silverado 250
- Location: Bowmanville, Ontario, Canadian Tire Motorsports Park
- Course: Permanent racing facility
- Course length: 2.459 miles (3.957 km)
- Distance: 64 laps, 157.376 mi (253.272 km)
- Scheduled distance: 64 laps, 157.376 mi (253.272 km)
- Average speed: 82.193 miles per hour (132.277 km/h)

Pole position
Driver	Austin Cindric	Brad Keselowski Racing
- Time: 1:18.602

Most laps led
Driver	Austin Cindric	Brad Keselowski Racing
- Laps: 32

Winner
No. 19	Austin Cindric	Brad Keselowski Racing

Television in the United States
- Network: Fox Sports 1
- Announcers: Vince Welch, Phil Parsons, Michael Waltrip

Radio in the United States
- Radio: Motor Racing Network

The 2017 Chevrolet Silverado 250 was the 15th stock car race of the 2017 NASCAR Camping World Truck Series and the fifth iteration of the event. The race was held on Sunday, September 3, 2017, in Bowmanville, Ontario, at Canadian Tire Motorsport Park, a 2.459 miles (3.957 km) permanent road course. The race took the scheduled 64 laps to complete. At race's end, Austin Cindric, driving for Brad Keselowski Racing, would spin out eventual-third-place finisher, GMS Racing driver Kaz Grala on the final lap to win his first and to date, only career NASCAR Camping World Truck Series win and his only win of the season. To fill out the podium, Noah Gragson of Kyle Busch Motorsports would finish second.

== Background ==
Canadian Tire Motorsport Park is a multi-track motorsport venue located north of Bowmanville, in Ontario, Canada. The facility features a 2.459-mile (3.957 km), (length reduced through wider track re-surfacing done in 2003) 10-turn road course; a 2.9 km advance driver and race driver training facility with a quarter-mile skid pad (Driver Development Centre) and a 1.5 km kart track (Mosport Kartways). The name "Mosport" is a portmanteau of Motor Sport, came from the enterprise formed to build the track.

=== Entry list ===
- (R) denotes rookie driver
- (i) denotes driver who is ineligible for series driver points

#	Driver	Team	Make	Sponsor
0	Tommy Regan (i)	Jennifer Jo Cobb Racing	Chevrolet	Driven 2 Honor
1	Jordan Anderson	TJL Motorsports	Chevrolet	Lucas Oil, Bommarito Automotive Group
02	Alex Tagliani (i)	Young's Motorsports	Chevrolet	Spectra Premium
4	Christopher Bell	Kyle Busch Motorsports	Toyota	Toyota
6	Norm Benning	Norm Benning Racing	Chevrolet	Norm Benning Racing
8	John Hunter Nemechek	NEMCO Motorsports	Chevrolet	Fire Alarm Services Throwback
10	Jennifer Jo Cobb	Jennifer Jo Cobb Racing	Chevrolet	Driven 2 Honor
13	Cody Coughlin (R)	ThorSport Racing	Toyota	JEGS
16	Ryan Truex	Hattori Racing Enterprises	Toyota	Don Valley North Toyota
18	Noah Gragson (R)	Kyle Busch Motorsports	Toyota	Switch
19	Austin Cindric (R)	Brad Keselowski Racing	Ford	Reese Brands, DrawTite Throwback
21	Johnny Sauter	GMS Racing	Chevrolet	Allegiant Air
22	Austin Wayne Self	AM Racing	Toyota	Texas Flood: We are One American Family!
24	Justin Haley (R)	GMS Racing	Chevrolet	Fraternal Order of Eagles
27	Ben Rhodes	ThorSport Racing	Toyota	Safelite Auto Glass
29	Chase Briscoe (R)	Brad Keselowski Racing	Ford	Cooper-Standard Throwback
33	Kaz Grala (R)	GMS Racing	Chevrolet	Stealth Body Fitness
45	Victor Gonzalez Jr.	Niece Motorsports	Chevrolet	Niece Motorsports
49	Gary Klutt (i)	Premium Motorsports	Chevrolet	Color Compass Corporation, Pioneer Family Pools
50	Bobby Reuse	Beaver Motorsports	Chevrolet	WCI Parts
51	Todd Gilliland	Kyle Busch Motorsports	Toyota	Pedigree
57	Mike Senica	Norm Benning Racing	Chevrolet	Norm Benning Racing
63	Todd Peck	MB Motorsports	Chevrolet	Cue Vapor Systems
66	Jason Hathaway	Bolen Motorsports	Chevrolet	Choko Authentics, Kubota
74	Joe Hudson	Mike Harmon Racing	Chevrolet	Alaska Raceway Park
75	Parker Kligerman	Henderson Motorsports	Toyota	Food Country USA
83	Camden Murphy	Copp Motorsports	Chevrolet	BYB Extreme
87	Joe Nemechek	NEMCO Motorsports	Chevrolet	Fire Alarm Services
88	Matt Crafton	ThorSport Racing	Toyota	Menards, Ideal Door
96	D. J. Kennington (i)	Gaunt Brothers Racing	Toyota	Castrol Edge, Spectra Premium
98	Grant Enfinger (R)	ThorSport Racing	Toyota	Champion Power Equipment
99	Brian Wong	MDM Motorsports	Chevrolet	MDM Motorsports
Official entry list

== Practice ==
=== First practice ===
The first practice session was held on Saturday, September 2, at 9:30 AM EST, and would last for 55 minutes. Austin Cindric of Brad Keselowski Racing would set the fastest time in the session, with a lap of 1:19.835 and an average speed of 110.884 miles per hour (178.451 km/h).

Pos.	#	Driver	Team	Make	Time	Speed
1	19	Austin Cindric (R)	Brad Keselowski Racing	Ford	1:19.835	110.884
2	4	Christopher Bell	Kyle Busch Motorsports	Toyota	1:19.881	110.820
3	16	Ryan Truex	Hattori Racing Enterprises	Toyota	1:20.272	110.280
Full first practice results

=== Second and final practice ===
The second and final practice session, sometimes referred to as Happy Hour, was held on Saturday, September 2, at 11:35 AM EST, and would last for 50 minutes. Christopher Bell of Kyle Busch Motorsports would set the fastest time in the session, with a lap of 1:19.129 and an average speed of 111.873 miles per hour (180.042 km/h).

Pos.	#	Driver	Team	Make	Time	Speed
1	4	Christopher Bell	Kyle Busch Motorsports	Toyota	1:19.129	111.873
2	18	Noah Gragson (R)	Kyle Busch Motorsports	Toyota	1:19.185	111.794
3	33	Kaz Grala (R)	GMS Racing	Chevrolet	1:19.427	111.453
Full Happy Hour practice results

== Qualifying ==
Qualifying was held on Saturday, September 2, at 5:45 PM EST. Since Canadian Tire Motorsport Park is a road course, the qualifying system was a multi-car system that included two rounds. The first round was 25 minutes, where every driver would be able to set a lap within the 25 minutes. Then, the second round would consist of the fastest 12 cars in Round 1, and drivers would have 10 minutes to set a lap. Whoever set the fastest time in Round 2 would win the pole.

Austin Cindric of Brad Keselowski Racing would win the pole, with a lap of 1:18.602 and an average speed of 112.623 miles per hour (181.249 km/h) in the second round.

No drivers would fail to qualify.

=== Full qualifying results ===
Pos.	#	Driver	Team	Make	Time (R1)	Speed (R1)	Time (R2)	Speed (R2)
1	19	Austin Cindric (R)	Brad Keselowski Racing	Ford	1:19:291	111.644	1:18.602	112.623
2	24	Justin Haley (R)	GMS Racing	Chevrolet	1:19:107	111.904	1:18.820	112.312
3	33	Kaz Grala (R)	GMS Racing	Chevrolet	1:19:661	111.126	1:19.056	111.976
4	75	Parker Kligerman	Henderson Motorsports	Toyota	1:19:897	110.798	1:19.180	111.801
5	4	Christopher Bell	Kyle Busch Motorsports	Toyota	1:19:313	111.613	1:19.328	111.592
6	18	Noah Gragson (R)	Kyle Busch Motorsports	Toyota	1:19:801	110.931	1:19.332	111.587
7	8	John Hunter Nemechek	NEMCO Motorsports	Chevrolet	1:19:251	111.701	1:19.368	111.536
8	88	Matt Crafton	ThorSport Racing	Toyota	1:19:858	110.852	1:19.677	111.104
9	27	Ben Rhodes	ThorSport Racing	Toyota	1:19:734	111.024	1:19.721	111.042
10	21	Johnny Sauter	GMS Racing	Chevrolet	1:19:542	111.292	1:19.965	110.703
11	16	Ryan Truex	Hattori Racing Enterprises	Toyota	1:19:881	110.820	1:20.066	110.564
12	02	Alex Tagliani (i)	Young's Motorsports	Chevrolet	1:19:950	110.724	1:20.439	110.051
Eliminated in Round 1
13	51	Todd Gilliland	Kyle Busch Motorsports	Toyota	1:20.163	110.430	-	-
14	49	Gary Klutt (i)	Premium Motorsports	Chevrolet	1:20.266	110.288	-	-
15	99	Brian Wong	MDM Motorsports	Chevrolet	1:20.443	110.046	-	-
16	98	Grant Enfinger (R)	ThorSport Racing	Toyota	1:20.579	109.860	-	-
17	96	D. J. Kennington (i)	Gaunt Brothers Racing	Toyota	1:20.924	109.392	-	-
18	29	Chase Briscoe (R)	Brad Keselowski Racing	Ford	1:21.156	109.079	-	-
19	13	Cody Coughlin (R)	ThorSport Racing	Toyota	1:21.701	108.351	-	-
20	22	Austin Wayne Self	AM Racing	Toyota	1:21.728	108.315	-	-
21	45	Victor Gonzalez Jr.	Niece Motorsports	Chevrolet	1:21.970	107.996	-	-
22	66	Jason Hathaway	Bolen Motorsports	Chevrolet	1:22.633	107.129	-	-
23	1	Jordan Anderson	TJL Motorsports	Chevrolet	1:26.493	102.348	-	-
24	83	Camden Murphy	Copp Motorsports	Chevrolet	1:26.855	101.922	-	-
25	87	Joe Nemechek	NEMCO Motorsports	Chevrolet	1:27.622	101.029	-	-
26	6	Norm Benning	Norm Benning Racing	Chevrolet	1:29.288	99.144	-	-
27	50	Bobby Reuse	Beaver Motorsports	Chevrolet	1:29.809	98.569	-	-
Qualified by owner's points
28	63	Todd Peck	MB Motorsports	Chevrolet	1:44.210	84.948	-	-
29	10	Jennifer Jo Cobb	Jennifer Jo Cobb Racing	Chevrolet	1:48.174	81.835	-	-
30	57	Mike Senica	Norm Benning Racing	Chevrolet	1:54.847	77.080	-	-
31	0	Tommy Regan (i)	Jennifer Jo Cobb Racing	Chevrolet	-	-	-	-
32	74	Joe Hudson	Mike Harmon Racing	Chevrolet	-	-	-	-
Official qualifying results
Official starting lineup

== Race results ==
Stage 1 Laps: 20

Pos.	#	Driver	Team	Make	Pts
1	19	Austin Cindric (R)	Brad Keselowski Racing	Ford	10
2	33	Kaz Grala (R)	GMS Racing	Chevrolet	9
3	4	Christopher Bell	Kyle Busch Motorsports	Toyota	8
4	8	John Hunter Nemechek	NEMCO Motorsports	Chevrolet	7
5	24	Justin Haley (R)	GMS Racing	Chevrolet	6
6	18	Noah Gragson (R)	Kyle Busch Motorsports	Toyota	5
7	16	Ryan Truex	Hattori Racing Enterprises	Toyota	4
8	75	Parker Kligerman	Henderson Motorsports	Toyota	3
9	51	Todd Gilliland	Kyle Busch Motorsports	Toyota	2
10	27	Ben Rhodes	ThorSport Racing	Toyota	1

Stage 2 Laps: 20

Pos.	#	Driver	Team	Make	Pts
1	16	Ryan Truex	Hattori Racing Enterprises	Toyota	10
2	29	Chase Briscoe (R)	Brad Keselowski Racing	Ford	9
3	27	Ben Rhodes	ThorSport Racing	Toyota	8
4	98	Grant Enfinger (R)	ThorSport Racing	Toyota	7
5	22	Austin Wayne Self	AM Racing	Toyota	6
6	96	D. J. Kennington (i)	Gaunt Brothers Racing	Toyota	0
7	66	Jason Hathaway	Bolen Motorsports	Chevrolet	4
8	45	Victor Gonzalez Jr.	Niece Motorsports	Chevrolet	3
9	75	Parker Kligerman	Henderson Motorsports	Toyota	2
10	51	Todd Gilliland	Kyle Busch Motorsports	Toyota	1

Stage 3 Laps: 24

Fin	St	#	Driver	Team	Make	Laps	Led	Status	Pts
1	1	19	Austin Cindric (R)	Brad Keselowski Racing	Ford	64	32	running	50
2	6	18	Noah Gragson (R)	Kyle Busch Motorsports	Toyota	64	0	running	40
3	3	33	Kaz Grala (R)	GMS Racing	Chevrolet	64	19	running	43
4	2	24	Justin Haley (R)	GMS Racing	Chevrolet	64	0	running	39
5	11	16	Ryan Truex	Hattori Racing Enterprises	Toyota	64	10	running	46
6	10	21	Johnny Sauter	GMS Racing	Chevrolet	64	0	running	31
7	18	29	Chase Briscoe (R)	Brad Keselowski Racing	Ford	64	0	running	39
8	4	75	Parker Kligerman	Henderson Motorsports	Toyota	64	2	running	34
9	20	22	Austin Wayne Self	AM Racing	Toyota	64	0	running	34
10	9	27	Ben Rhodes	ThorSport Racing	Toyota	64	1	running	36
11	13	51	Todd Gilliland	Kyle Busch Motorsports	Toyota	64	0	running	29
12	15	99	Brian Wong	MDM Motorsports	Chevrolet	64	0	running	25
13	16	98	Grant Enfinger (R)	ThorSport Racing	Toyota	64	0	running	31
14	17	96	D. J. Kennington (i)	Gaunt Brothers Racing	Toyota	64	0	running	0
15	22	66	Jason Hathaway	Bolen Motorsports	Chevrolet	64	0	running	26
16	21	45	Victor Gonzalez Jr.	Niece Motorsports	Chevrolet	64	0	running	24
17	27	50	Bobby Reuse	Beaver Motorsports	Chevrolet	64	0	running	20
18	26	6	Norm Benning	Norm Benning Racing	Chevrolet	64	0	running	19
19	12	02	Alex Tagliani (i)	Young's Motorsports	Chevrolet	63	0	running	18
20	7	8	John Hunter Nemechek	NEMCO Motorsports	Chevrolet	63	0	running	24
21	19	13	Cody Coughlin (R)	ThorSport Racing	Toyota	60	0	running	16
22	24	83	Camden Murphy	Copp Motorsports	Chevrolet	58	0	running	15
23	23	1	Jordan Anderson	TJL Motorsports	Chevrolet	55	0	running	14
24	14	49	Gary Klutt (i)	Premium Motorsports	Chevrolet	54	0	suspension	0
25	8	88	Matt Crafton	ThorSport Racing	Toyota	46	0	engine	12
26	5	4	Christopher Bell	Kyle Busch Motorsports	Toyota	44	0	engine	19
27	32	74	Joe Hudson	Mike Harmon Racing	Chevrolet	12	0	brakes	10
28	29	10	Jennifer Jo Cobb	Jennifer Jo Cobb Racing	Chevrolet	7	0	clutch	9
29	28	63	Todd Peck	MB Motorsports	Chevrolet	5	0	transmission	8
30	30	57	Mike Senica	Norm Benning Racing	Chevrolet	2	0	clutch	7
31	25	87	Joe Nemechek	NEMCO Motorsports	Chevrolet	1	0	suspension	6
32	31	0	Tommy Regan (i)	Jennifer Jo Cobb Racing	Chevrolet	0	0	engine	0
Official race results

== Standings after the race ==
Drivers' Championship standings

Pos	Driver	Points
1	Christopher Bell	634
2	Johnny Sauter	604 (-30)
3	Matt Crafton	574 (–60)
4	Chase Briscoe	573 (–61)
5	Ben Rhodes	505 (–129)
6	Ryan Truex	498 (–136)
7	Grant Enfinger	474 (–160)
8	John Hunter Nemechek	463 (–171)
Official driver's standings

- Note: Only the first 8 positions are included for the driver standings.

Previous race: 2017 UNOH 200	NASCAR Camping World Truck Series; 2017 season	Next race: 2017 TheHouse.com 225
