= Alaska Raceway Park =

Racetrack

- Location: Palmer, Alaska, United States
- Coordinates: 61°31′30″N 149°01′28″W
- Owner: Lackey Family
- Address: 5599 S Race Way
- Opened: 1964
- Website: www.raceak.com

Drag Strip
- Length: 0.250 mi (0.402 km)

Alaska Raceway Park is a motorsports complex with a 1/3 mile oval and a 1/4 dragstrip (the only one in the state) located in Butte. It is near the Knik River, and Knik Glacier at Mile 10.4 of the Old Glenn Highway, about 41.5 miles northeast of Anchorage, Alaska, US. Nearby 6,398-foot Pioneer Peak looms over the finish line, providing a scenic racing venue recognized worldwide among race fans. The track sits at an elevation of 63 feet above sea level, offering excellent air pressure for racing. The venue conducting races from Mother's Day to Labor Day.

== Drag strip ==
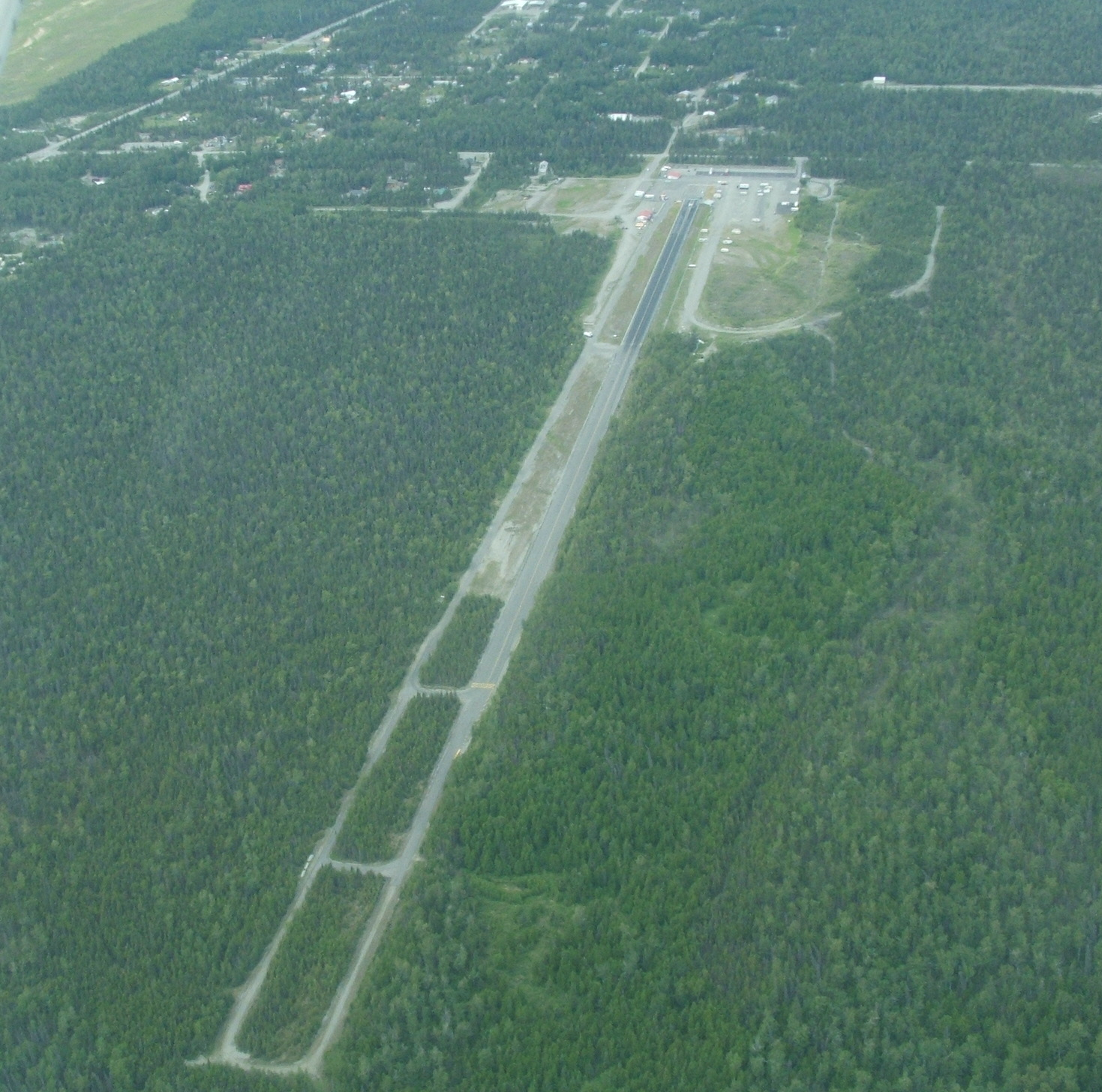
Northerly aerial view of Alaska Raceway Park in June 2006. Remnants of the original oval track can be seen next to the drag strip.

The 1/4-mile drag strip was opened in 1964 and operated on leased land for the next 30 years by Lee and Fern Nelson, and sons Ron and Larry as Polar Dragway. The track has had several names over the years, including Thunder Valley Raceway, Valley Raceway, Big Valley Raceway, and Polar Raceway. In November 1994, the racing operation was purchased from Lee Nelson and incorporated as Top End, Inc., held by a group of businesspeople who loved motorsport. The group included Jack (Randy) Harris, Louie Kirk, John Childs, Jerry Schreiner, Gregg Gunnarson, and Kristen Kinn, and the name was changed to Alaska Raceway Park. Earl Lackey purchased Jerry Schreiner's shares in 1995. Top End completed extensive changes: environmental cleanup, installation of an entrance via Sullivan Road, installation of new bleachers and sound system, and re-roofing of all buildings.

=== IHRA Years ===
The drag strip became the only Alaska IHRA member track on March 1, 1995, through the efforts of Gregg Gunnarson. In 2003, Alaska Raceway Park was recognized by IHRA as Track of the Year for showing "positive growth and success on the track." In 2012 IHRA recognized Alaska Raceway Park as the Summit SuperSeries Track of the Year for Division 6. In Fall 1998, Earl and Karen Lackey bought the corporate stock from the other owners and, with their daughter, Michelle Lackey Maynor, remain the current owners. They continue track improvements, including new bleachers on the pit side, remodeling the main building (snack bar and lounge), adding a gift shop, enlarging the work shop, adding improved firefighting and track-cleaning equipment, paving the staging area and pit parking, and installing a separate entry gate for racers.

In April 2000, after 35 winters and thousands of rounds of racing, the track surface was weathered and frost-heaved. A new audio system with a radio transmitter was also installed before the massive cooperative effort to grind up the old track, lay a new bed using laser-controlled machinery, constructing a heated 300-foot concrete launch pad, then laying down 4,100 feet of asphalt. Much of the work was accomplished through volunteers, with assistance from the Operator's Union, VECO, Denali Concrete, and a donation of emulsion from Tesoro Refining and Marketing. On May 21, 2000, a new state-of-the-art computerized timing system was put into use.

In 2002, the Lackeys successfully purchased the 155 acres previously leased from the State of Alaska, as well as an adjoining 27 acres from the Matanuska-Susitna Borough. This purchase made the track's status permanent and provided room for parking.

=== NHRA Years ===
In November 2019, Alaska Raceway Park signed as a new Division 6 National Hot Rod Association (NHRA) track. This official drag strip sanctioning offers ARP racers opportunities in the NHRA Summit Racing Series, NHRA Summit Racing Jr. Drag Racing League, NHRA Jr. Street, and NHRA Drags: Street Legal Style presented by AAA. Additionally, the track will have the opportunity to host NHRA's specialty events, including the National Dragster Challenge, NHRA Summit King of the Track, and NHRA Summit Racing Jr. Drag Racing League Challenge.

=== Announcers ===
Over the years there have been many voices floating over the drag strip P.A. system: "Big Daddy" Dave, Jerry Pierce, Steve Byrd, Rodney Villanueva, "Big Schwag" Brett Wagner, "Chatterbox" Christa Mayfield, Alex Van Nice, Justin Giles and Sean Farris.

== Oval track ==
An adjacent 1/4-mile dirt oval track was operated from 1980 to 1986.

In 2016 a new 1/3-mile asphalt oval track debuted, sponsored in part by Tesoro Refining and Marketing, Pruhs Construction, Soper's Concrete, Valley Block and Concrete, E-Terra, Acutek Geomatics, New Horizons Telecom, and J.D. Steel Co. The oval track was sanctioned in February 2016 as a home track by NASCAR in its Whelen All-American Series, consequently, the track became the first NASCAR-sanctioned track in Alaska and also the northernmost NASCAR-sanctioned track in the world.

Notable NASCAR drivers, like: Jordan Anderson, Jake Griffin, Bobby Reuse, Ken Schrader, Roger Reuse and Joe Hudson have competed at Alaska Raceway Park. Keith McGee (the first-ever driver from Alaska to race in any series in NASCAR) also ran at the track.
