= Mike Harmon Racing =

NASCAR team

- Owner: Mike Harmon
- Base: Denver, North Carolina
- Series: NASCAR O'Reilly Auto Parts Series
- Race drivers: 74. Dawson Cram, Baltazar Leguizamón, Logan Bearden, Matt Wilson
- Manufacturer: Chevrolet
- Opened: 2005

Career
- Debut: O'Reilly Auto Parts Series: 2007 Pepsi 300 (Nashville); Truck Series: 2009 MemphisTravel.com 200 (Memphis); ARCA Menards Series: 2005 Pennsylvania 200 (Pocono)
- Races competed: Total: 498; O'Reilly Auto Parts Series: 370; Truck Series: 83; ARCA Menards Series: 45
- Drivers' Championships: Total: 0 O'Reilly Auto Parts Series: 0 Truck Series: 0 ARCA Menards Series: 0
- Race victories: Total: 0 O'Reilly Auto Parts Series: 0 Truck Series: 0 ARCA Menards Series: 0
- Pole positions: Total: 0 O'Reilly Auto Parts Series: 0 Truck Series: 0 ARCA Menards Series: 0

Mike Harmon Racing (formerly CHK Racing, Elite 2 Racing and Richardson-Netzloff-Harmon Racing) is an American professional stock car racing team that fields the No. 74 Chevrolet Camaro SS part-time in the NASCAR O'Reilly Auto Parts Series for multiple drivers.

Mike Harmon initially owned the team with two other co-owners, Donnie Richardson and Eddie Netzloff, in its first two years and the team was known as Richardson-Netzloff-Harmon Racing in 2007 and then Elite 2 Racing in 2008 before Harmon became the sole owner in 2009 and renamed the team Mike Harmon Racing, its name until 2023 after Michael Clayton Sr. and former JD Motorsports co-owner Gary Keller joined the team as co-owners.

== NASCAR O'Reilly Auto Parts Series ==
Mike Harmon Racing, briefly known as Elite 2 Racing, has been active in the Xfinity Series since the 2007 season, with the exception of the 2010 season. They have had more than 250 entries over 15 seasons. Since 2011, the team has primarily fielded the No. 74 car and more recently added the No. 47. The highest the team has finished in owner points was 30th, which came in the 2020 season.

=== Car No. 17 history ===
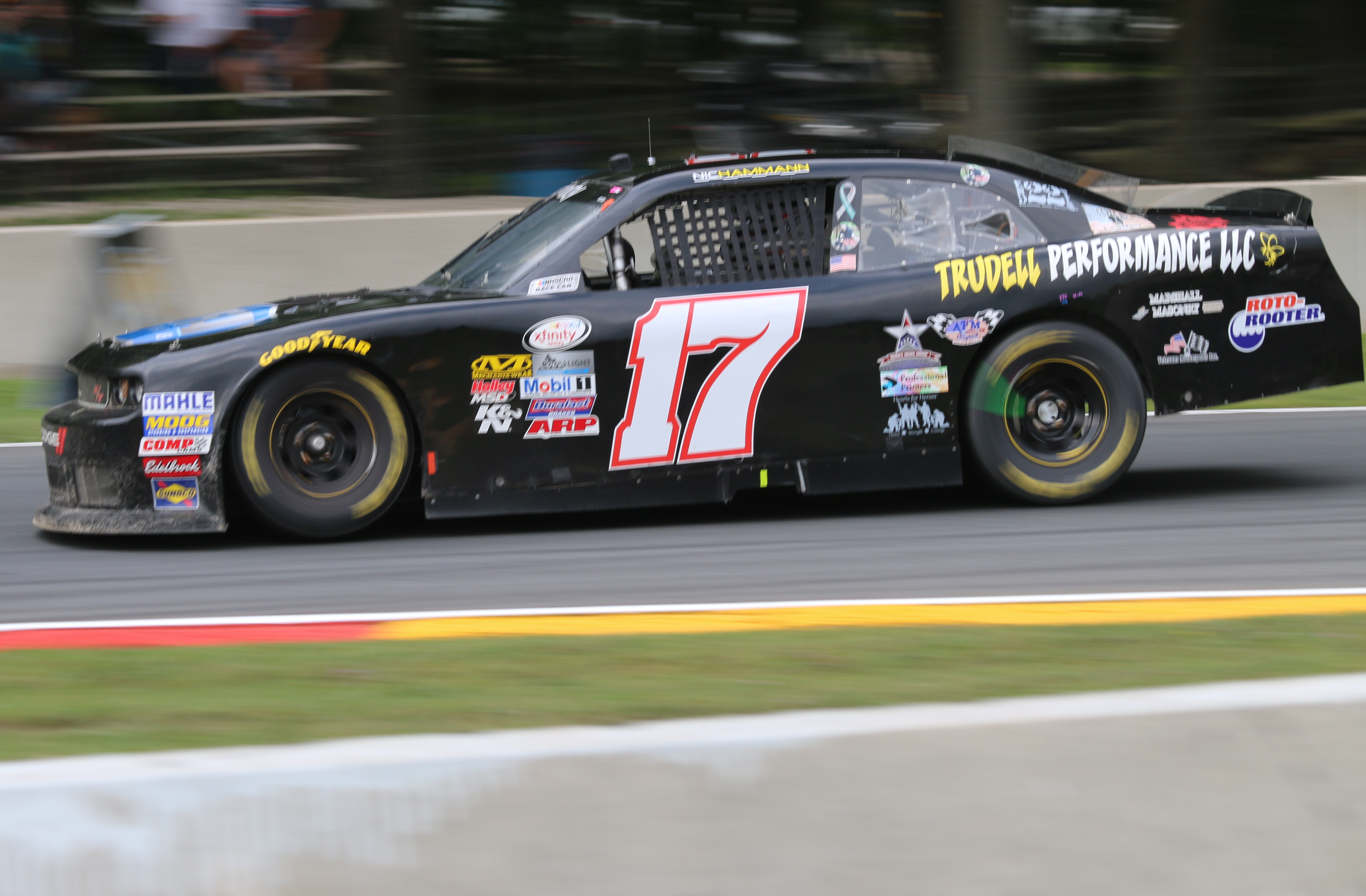
Nicolas Hammann driving the Rick Ware Racing No. 17 at Road America in 2017 in a collaboration with MHR

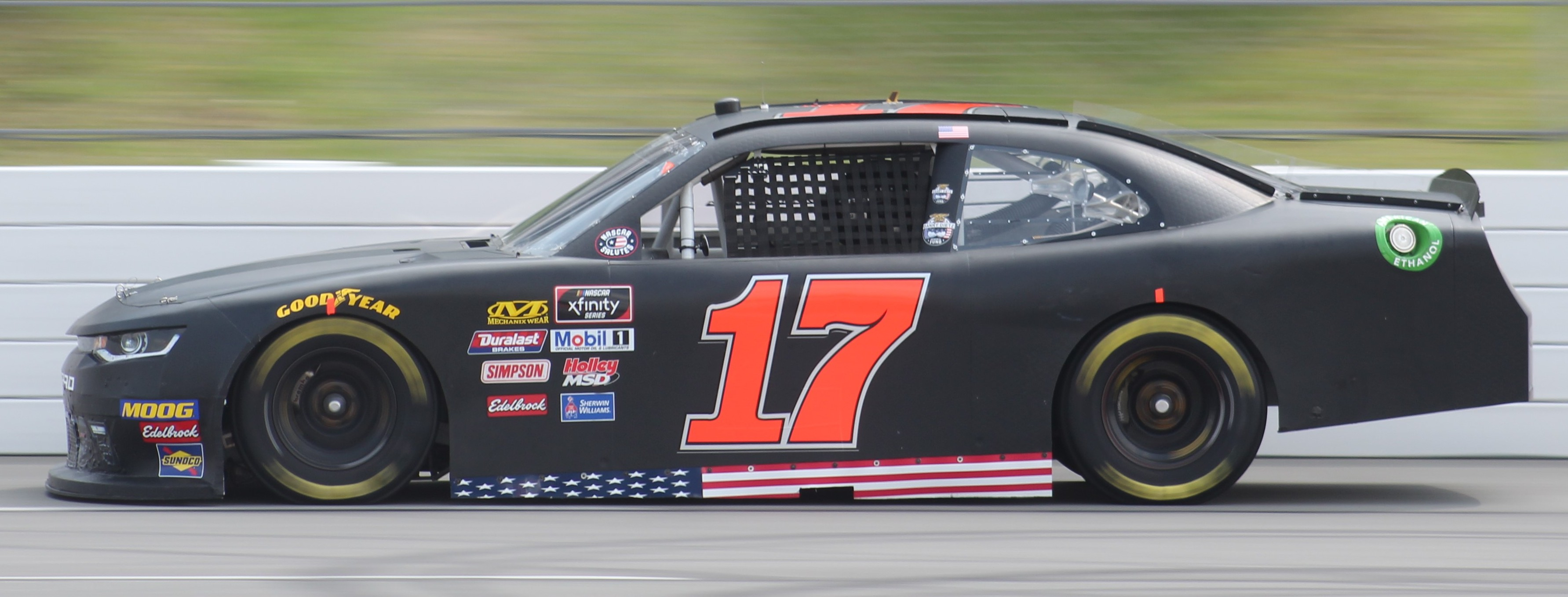
Camden Murphy driving the No. 17 at Pocono in 2019

In 2017, MHR and Rick Ware Racing partnered to field the No. 17 Dodge Challenger at the Johnsonville 180 at Road America. The team chose road course ringer and 2014 GT Academy USA winner Nicolas Hammann, to drive the entry. The team finished 29th after starting 40th.

Two seasons later, in 2019, MHR again joined with Rick Ware to jointly field the No. 17 car starting in May at Charlotte. The mid-season move came after Rick Ware Racing to field a full-time entry, but decided to scale back. The partnership fielded fifteen entries in total for the 2019 season, finishing 44th in owner points.

==== Car No. 17 results ====
Year	Driver	No.	Make	1	2	3	4	5	6	7	8	9	10	11	12	13	14	15	16	17	18	19	20	21	22	23	24	25	26	27	28	29	30	31	32	33	Owners	Pts
2017	Nicolas Hammann	17	Dodge	DAY	ATL	LVS	PHO	CAL	TEX	BRI	RCH	TAL	CLT	DOV	POC	MCH	IOW	DAY	KEN	NHA	IND	IOW	GLN	MOH	BRI	ROA; 29	DAR	RCH	CHI	KEN	DOV	CLT	KAN	TEX	PHO	HOM		
2019	Bayley Currey	17	Chevy	DAY	ATL	LVS	PHO	CAL	TEX	BRI	RCH	TAL	DOV	CLT; 33		MCH; 33	IOW				NHA; 35												KAN; 35					
2019	Camden Murphy	17	Chevy												POC; 32					KEN; 33																		
2019	Josh Bilicki	17	Chevy															CHI; 35	DAY																			
2019	Mark Meunier	17	Chevy																			IOW; DNQ	GLN	MOH														
2019	Joe Nemechek	17	Chevy																						BRI; 35	ROA	DAR; 34		LVS; 33	RCH; 32	CLT	DOV; 30			PHO; 34			
2019	Kyle Weatherman	17	Chevy																									IND; 35						TEX; 34				
2019	Robby Lyons	17	Chevy																																	HOM; 28		

=== Car No. 44 history ===
The No. 44 car was fielded for 12 races in MHR's debut year, 2007. Owner, Mike Harmon, was behind the wheel for eight races, Johnny Borneman III for one, and Jennifer Jo Cobb made three attempts. The team failed to qualify for six of the 12 races that they entered.

==== Car No. 44 results ====
Year	Driver	No.	Make	1	2	3	4	5	6	7	8	9	10	11	12	13	14	15	16	17	18	19	20	21	22	23	24	25	26	27	28	29	30	31	32	33	34	35	Owners	Pts
2007	Mike Harmon	44	Chevy	DAY	CAL	MXC	LVS	ATL	BRI	NSH	TEX	PHO; 41	TAL	RCH	DAR	CLT	DOV	NSH	KEN	MLW; 38	NHA; 38	DAY	CHI	GTY; DNQ	IRP; 43	CGV	GLN	MCH	BRI			DOV; 39			MEM; DNQ	TEX; DNQ				
2007	Johnny Borneman III	44	Chevy																											CAL; 42	RCH									
2007	Jennifer Jo Cobb	44	Chevy																														KAN; DNQ	CLT			PHO; DNQ	HOM; DNQ		

=== Car No. 47 history ===
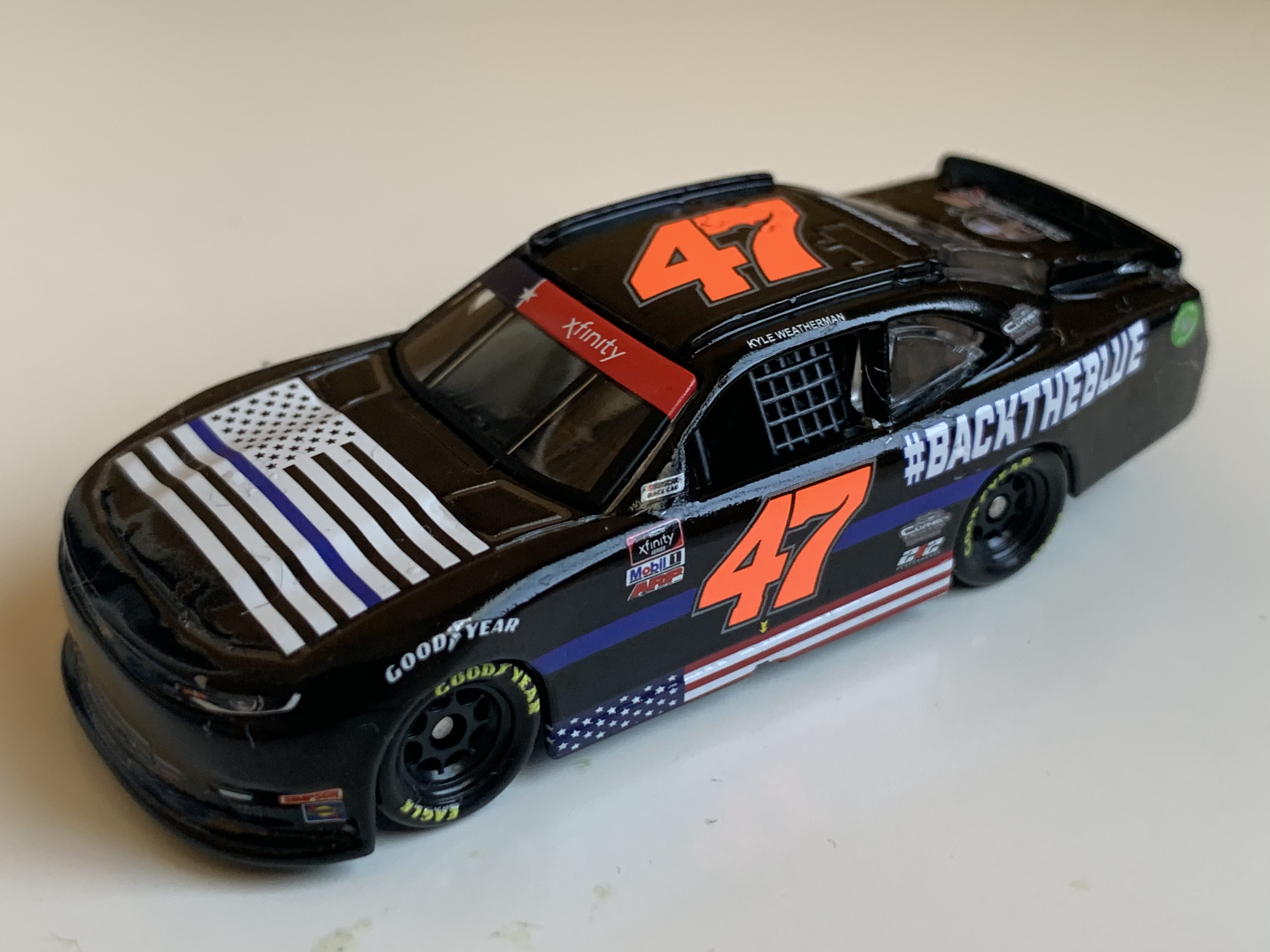
Kyle Weatherman's No. 47 Back the Blue paint scheme in 2021

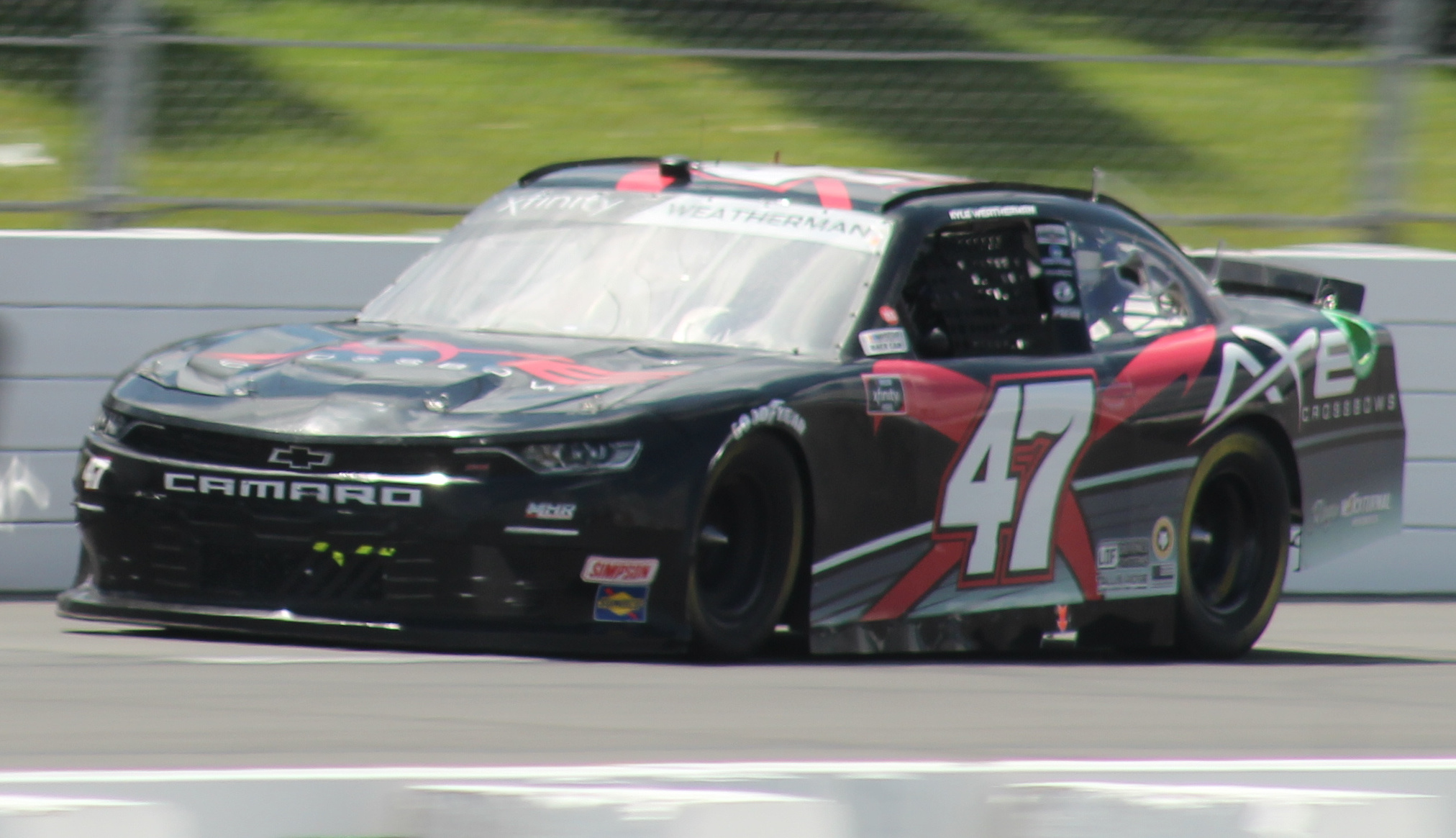
Weatherman's No. 47 at Pocono Raceway in 2021

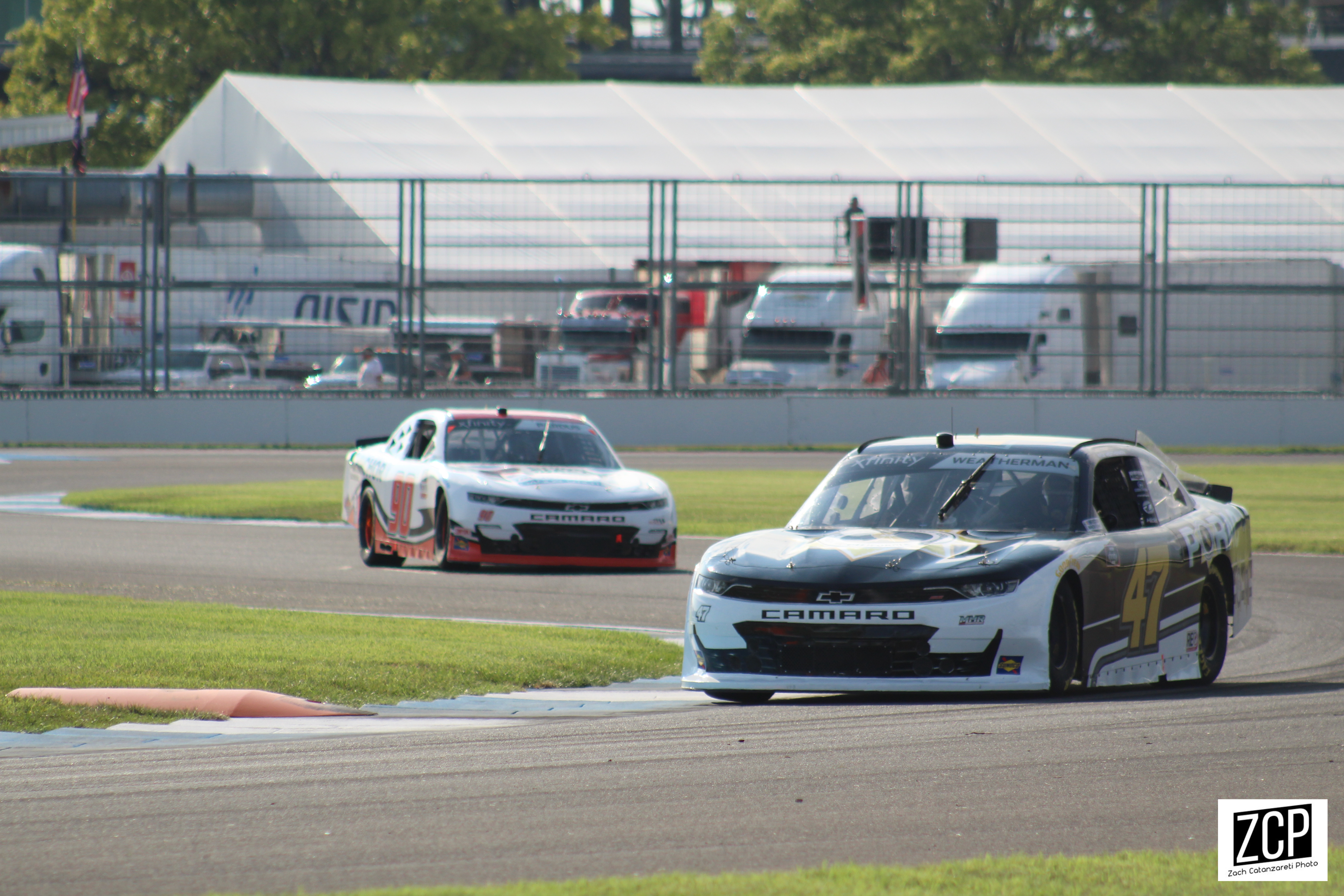
Weatherman racing Preston Pardus (No. 90) at the Indianapolis Road Course in 2021

Dawson Cram in the No. 47 car at Las Vegas Motor Speedway in 2026

In 2020, MHR and RWR ended its partnership, the team decided to continue running two cars for the 2020 NXS season. The car was renumbered to No. 47, the inverse of their No. 74 entry.

NASCAR veteran Joe Nemechek handled a majority of the driving duties for the car in the first one-third of the season, while Kyle Weatherman drove a majority of the races in the last two-thirds. Additionally, Bayley Currey, Tim Viens, and Josh Reaume, drove races for the entry. The team finished 34th in owner points.

On August 17, 2020, the vehicle and trailer that carried the race car, pit box, and tool box for the No. 47 was stolen from a Cracker Barrel parking lot in Kingsland, Georgia, on their return trip from a race at Daytona International Speedway. The estimated evaluation of the stolen items was approximately US$400,000. As of 2022, the vehicle and trailer had not been found, despite a US$10,000 reward.

Weatherman was elevated full-time to the No. 47 car for the 2021 season. He was able to qualify for 30 of 33 races and finish 24th in the driver's points standings and 31st in owner's points. In an announcement on January 7, 2022, it was made public that Weatherman and MHR had departed ways with no report of a replacement driver.

In 2022, Gray Gaulding attempted to qualify in the No. 47 for the 2022 Beef. It's What's for Dinner. 300 at Daytona International Speedway, which he failed to do so. Brennan Poole took over driving duties for the majority of the season.

In 2026, MHR brought back the No. 47 at Chicagoland in partnership with Team Stange Racing. Dawson Cram was tabbed as the driver for the race, where he finished 38th. Cram would also driving the No. 47 for multiple races starting at summer Daytona race. He failed to quality at Daytona. Carson Ware would drive the No. 47 at Atlanta, Iowa, and fall Talladega race. He failed to quality at Talladega. David Starr would drive the No. 47 at Indianapolis. Natalie Decker would drive the No. 47 at Bristol night race in partnership with Young's Motorsports.

==== Car No. 47 results ====
Year	Driver	No.	Make	1	2	3	4	5	6	7	8	9	10	11	12	13	14	15	16	17	18	19	20	21	22	23	24	25	26	27	28	29	30	31	32	33	Owners	Pts	Ref
2020	Joe Nemechek	47	Chevy	DAY; 15	LVS; 27		PHO; 32	DAR; 28	CLT; 26	BRI; 32	ATL; 32																				TAL; 16						34th	343	
2020	Bayley Currey	47	Chevy			CAL; 32																															34th	343	
2020	Kyle Weatherman	47	Chevy									HOM; 33	HOM; 35		POC; 15	IND; 15	KEN; 8	KEN; 36	TEX; 28	KAN; 36	ROA; 21	DAY; 17	DOV; 25	DOV; 35		DAR; 36	RCH; 26	RCH; 20	BRI; 32	LVS; 36		CLT; 37		TEX; 19	MAR; 30	PHO; 17	34th	343	
2020	Tim Viens	47	Chevy											TAL; 36											DAY; 18												34th	343	
2020	Josh Reaume	47	Chevy																														KAN; 33				34th	343	
2021	Kyle Weatherman	47	Chevy	DAY; 15	DAY; 16	HOM; 25	LVS; 33	PHO; 34	ATL; 28	MAR; 25	TAL; 23	DAR; 33	DOV; 22	COA; DNQ	CLT; DNQ	MOH; 26	TEX; 37	NSH; 28	POC; 26	ROA; DNQ	ATL; 32	NHA; 19	GLN; 34	IND; 16	MCH; 24	DAY; 32	DAR; 34	RCH; 15	BRI; 29	LVS; 18	TAL; 20	CLT; 23	TEX; 25	KAN; 21	MAR; 34	PHO; 26	31st	341	
2022	Gray Gaulding	47	Chevy	DAY; DNQ								TAL; 21																				CLT; DNQ	LVS	HOM			43rd	54	
2022	Brennan Poole	47	Chevy		CAL; DNQ	LVS; 37	PHO; DNQ	ATL; DNQ	COA; DNQ	RCH; 38	MAR; 38		DOV; DNQ	DAR; DNQ	TEX; DNQ	CLT; 35		NSH; DNQ		ATL; 31		POC; DNQ		MCH; DNQ			DAR; 31	KAN; 37									43rd	54	
2022	Ryan Vargas	47	Chevy														PIR; 23		ROA; DNQ																		43rd	54	
2022	Bobby McCarty	47	Chevy																		NHA; DNQ																43rd	54	
2022	Brandon Brown	47	Chevy																				IND; 34														43rd	54	
2022	Stanton Barrett	47	Chevy																						GLN; DNQ												43rd	54	
2022	Tim Viens	47	Chevy																							DAY; DNQ											43rd	54	
2022	Dawson Cram	47	Chevy																										BRI; DNQ	TEX					MAR; DNQ	PHO	43rd	54	
2022	Mike Harmon	47	Chevy																												TAL; 34						43rd	54	
2026	Dawson Cram	47	Chevy	DAY	ATL	COA	PHO	LVS	DAR	MAR	ROC	BRI	KAN	TAL	TEX	GLN	DOV	CLT	NSH	POC	COR	SON	CHI; 38				DAY; DNQ	DAR; 36	GTW; 36		LVS; 35	CLT; 37	PHO; 37		MAR; 28	HOM; 35	38th	98	
2026	Carson Ware	47	Chevy																					ATL; 36		IOW; 37								TAL; DNQ			38th	98	
2026	David Starr	47	Chevy																						IND; 35												38th	98	
2026	Natalie Decker	47	Chevy																											BRI; 37							38th	98	

=== Car No. 48 history ===
In 2007, the team fielded the No. 48 car for Harmon for two races at Nashville and Kentucky. He finished 40th and 41st respectively.

==== Car No. 48 results ====
Year	Driver	No.	Make	1	2	3	4	5	6	7	8	9	10	11	12	13	14	15	16	17	18	19	20	21	22	23	24	25	26	27	28	29	30	31	32	33	34	35	Owners	Pts
2007	Mike Harmon	48	Chevy	DAY	CAL	MXC	LVS	ATL	BRI	NSH; 40	TEX	PHO	TAL	RCH	DAR	CLT	DOV	NSH	KEN; 41	MLW	NHA	DAY	CHI	GTY	IRP	CGV	GLN	MCH	BRI	CAL	RCH	DOV	KAN	CLT	MEM	TEX	PHO	HOM		

=== Car No. 74 history ===
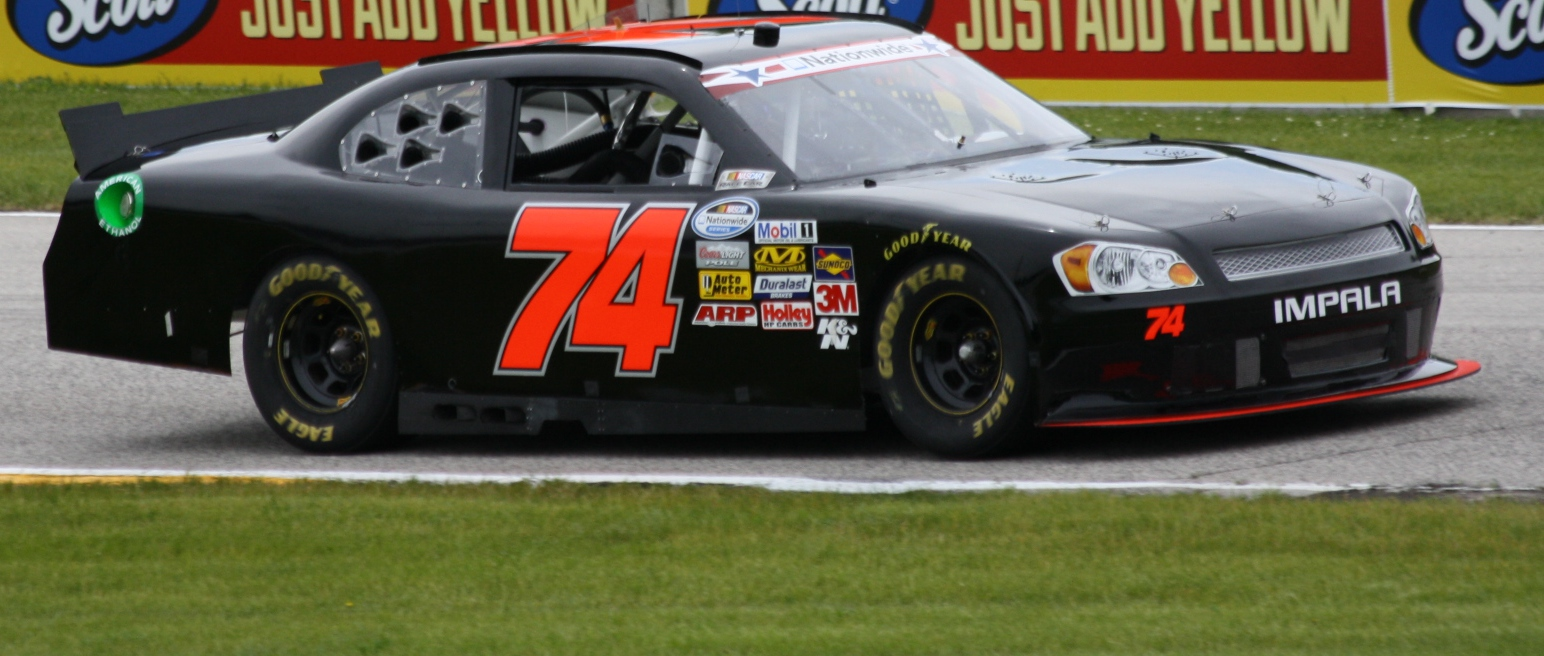
Kevin O'Connell driving the No. 74 at Road America 2013

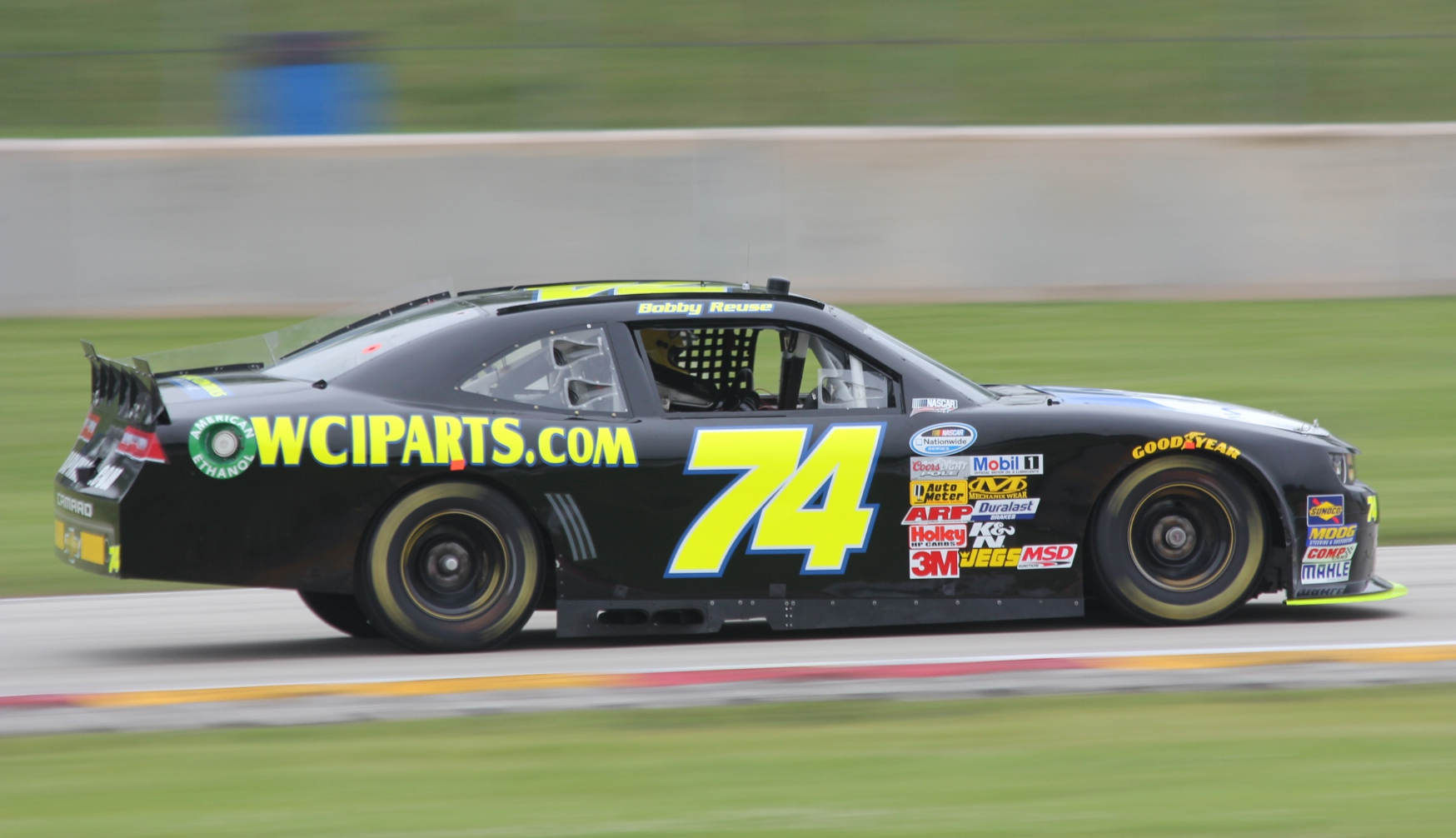
Bobby Reuse driving the No. 74 at Road America in 2014

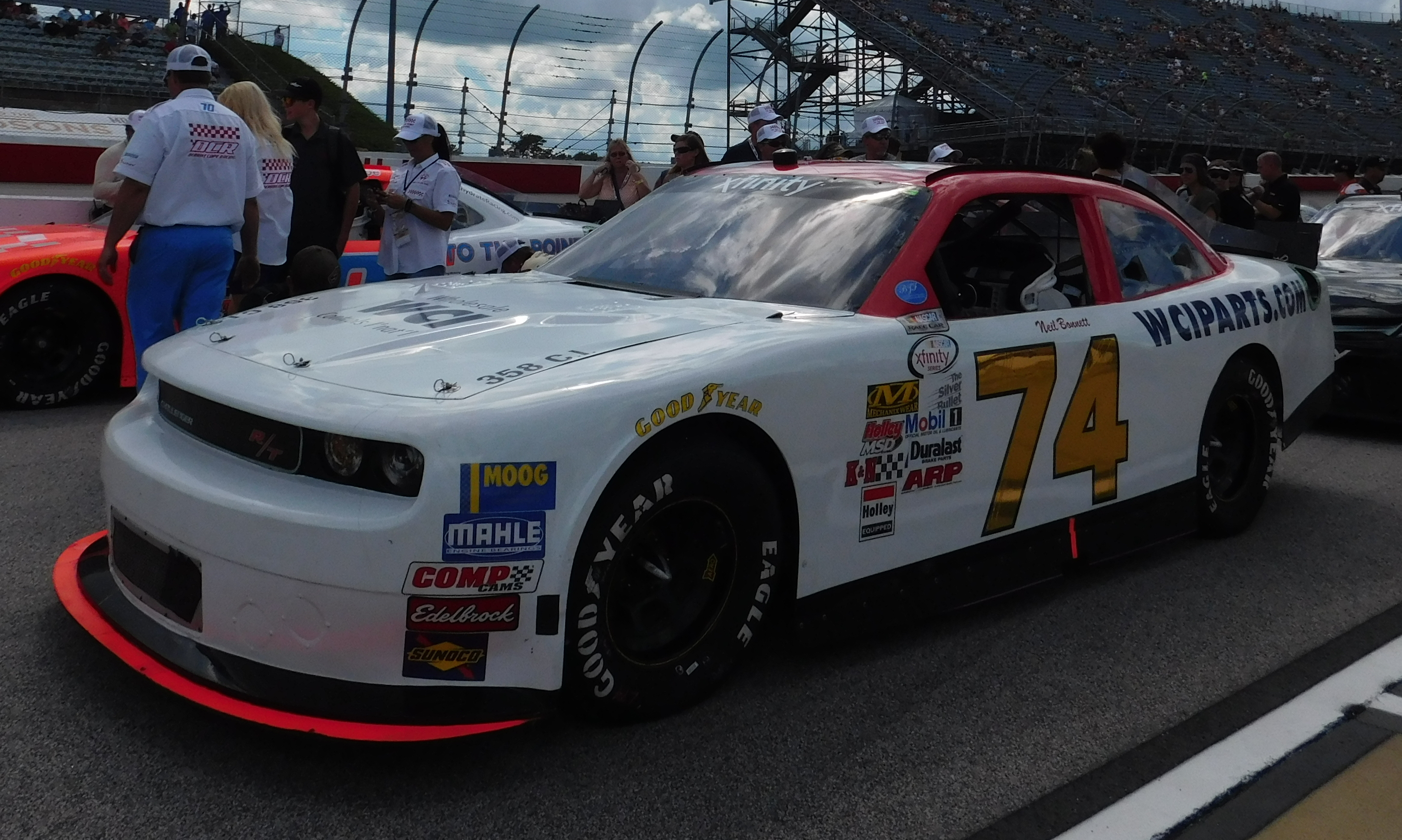
Harmon's Darlington throwback paint scheme in 2016

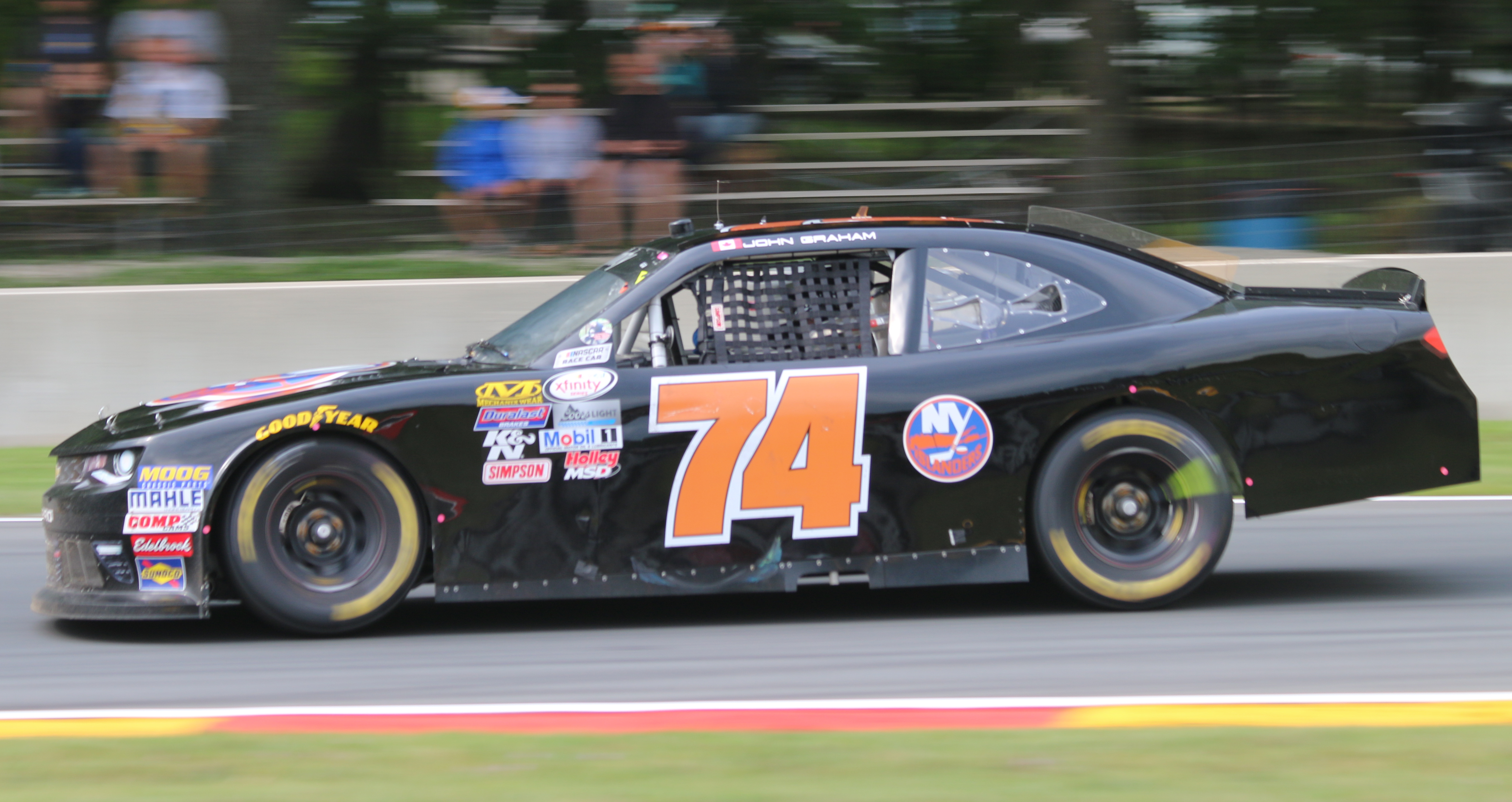
John Graham driving the No. 74 at Road America in 2017

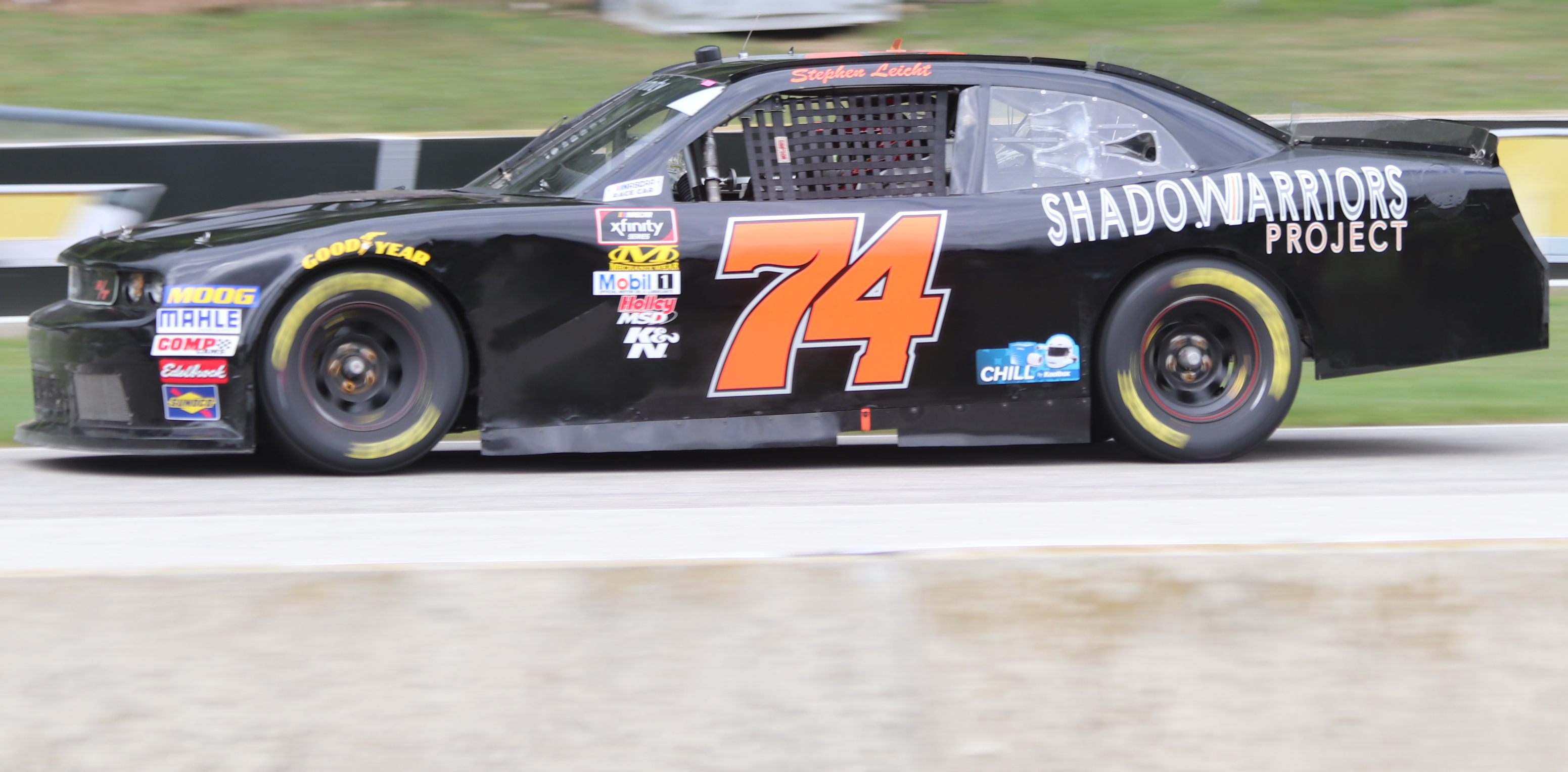
Stephen Leicht driving the No. 74 at Road America in 2018

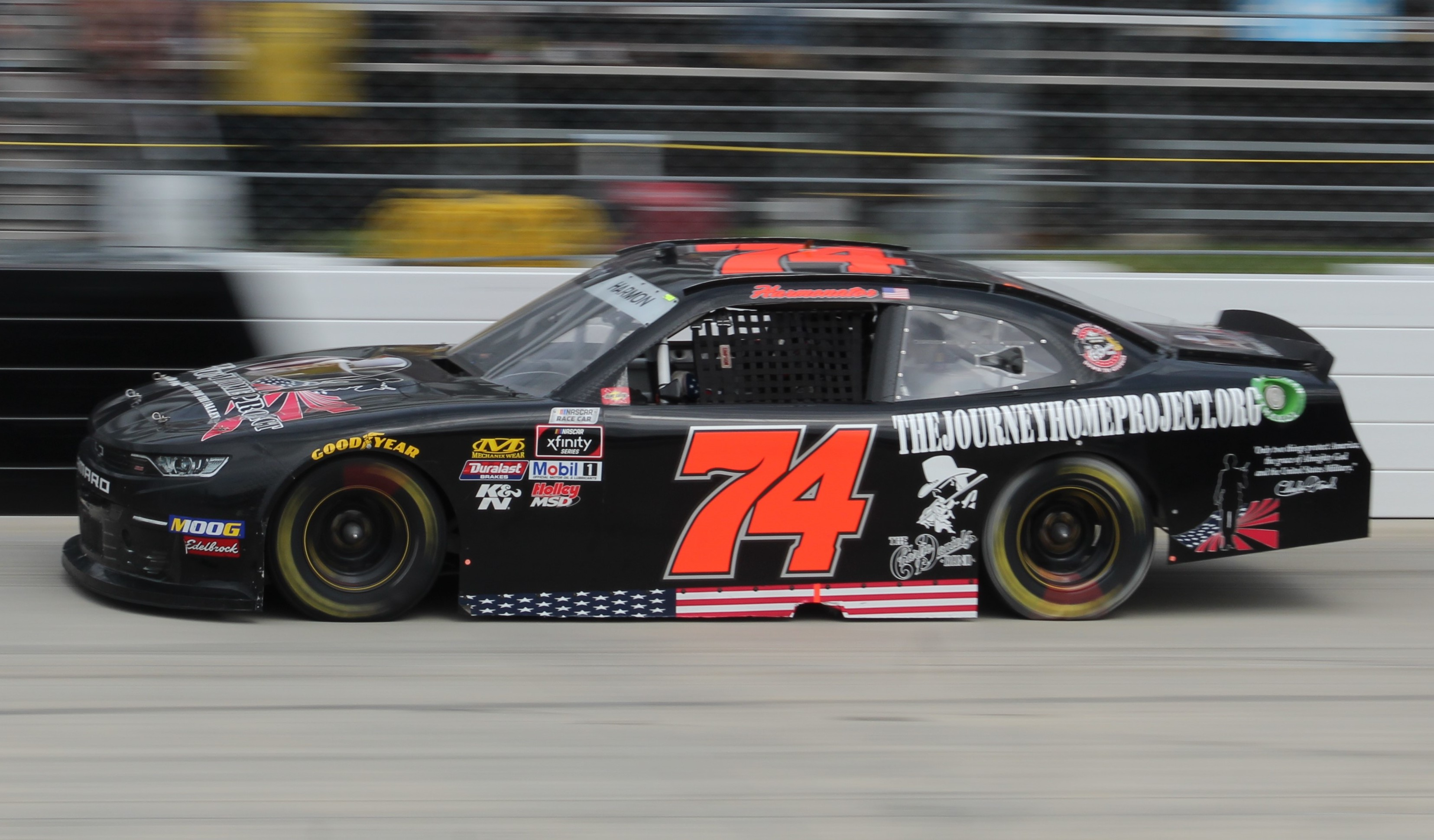
Mike Harmon driving the No. 74 at Dover in May 2019

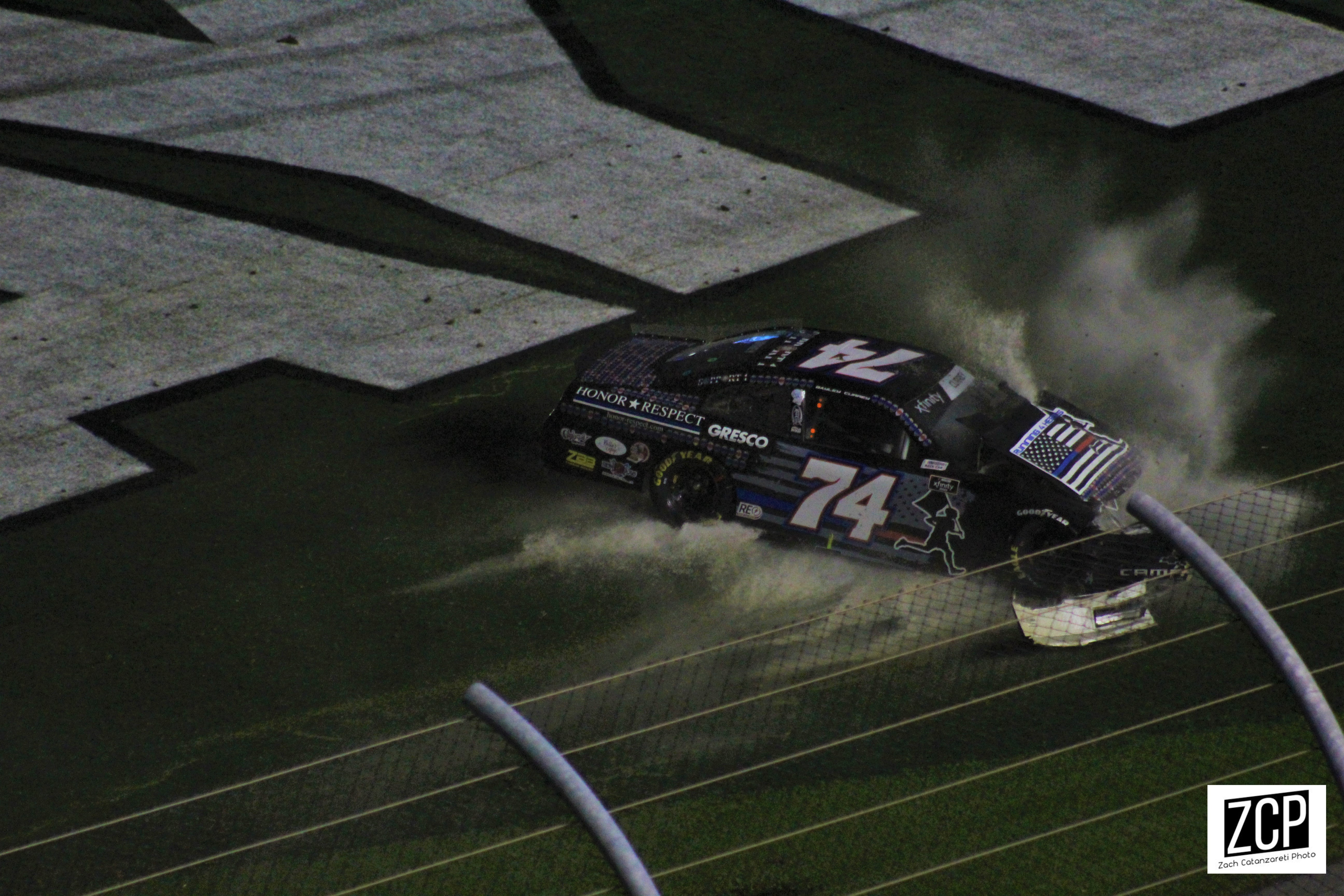
Bayley Currey after his crash in the season-opener at Daytona in 2021

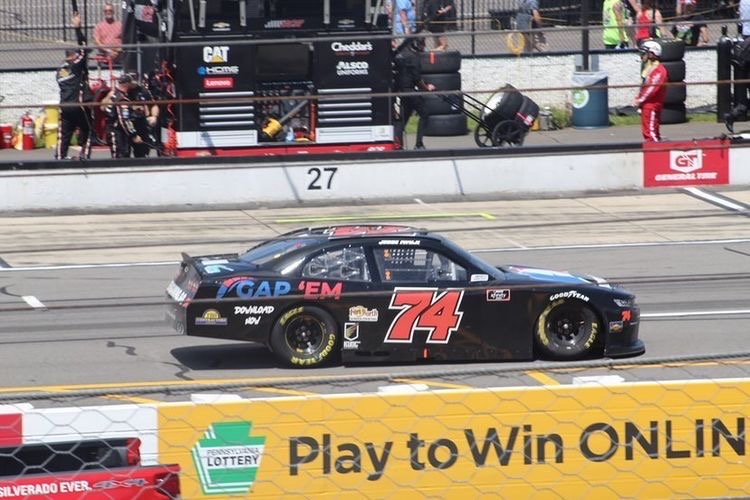
Jesse Iwuji driving the No. 74 at Pocono in 2021

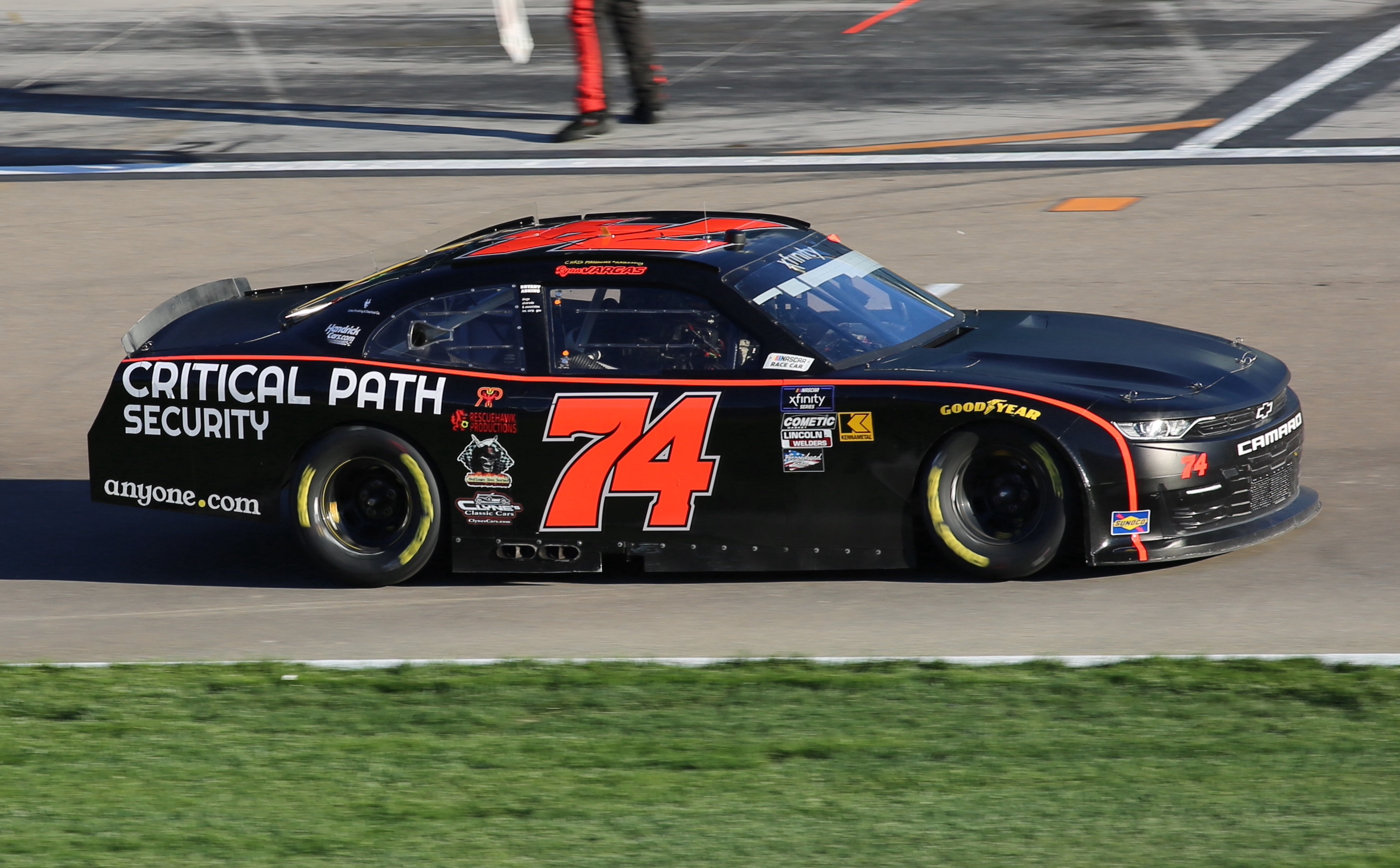
Ryan Vargas driving the No. 74 at Las Vegas Motor Speedway in 2024

Harmon debuted the No. 74 team in 2011 at Auto Club Speedway, start and parking after three laps and finishing 43rd. The next race the No. 74 attempted was at Texas Motor Speedway with J. J. Yeley behind the wheel, who parked the car after five laps. That season, Harmon ran fourteen races and Yeley ran two, all of them being start and parks.

The following season, 2012, Harmon continued to start and park the car, with Kevin Lepage, Rick Crawford, David Green and Scott Riggs being brought in for one race each.

During 2013, Harmon began to bring in many new drivers. That season, Harmon himself only drove seven races, with Kevin Lepage, Juan Carlos Blum, Danny Efland, Carl Long and Kevin O'Connell running races. Notably, the team did not start and park in most races they entered that year. O'Connell scored the team their best non-superspeedway finish up to then, a 22nd-place finish at Road America while staying on the lead lap. Harmon also scored their best finish up to then at Daytona, finishing seventeenth on the lead lap.

Harmon ran most races in 2014, and they again start and parked most times. Kevin Lepage, Mike Wallace, Reuse brothers Bobby and Roger also had seat time. The team's best finish that year was a 24th-place finish at Mid-Ohio with Bobby Reuse, six laps down.

For 2015, Harmon attempted 29 races in the 74, start and parking in twelve races and failing to qualify in two of them, Talladega and Charlotte. The Reuse brothers returned, with Bobby driving at Watkins Glen and Roger driving at Road America. Jordan Anderson drove at Bristol, and Tim Viens drove in the finale race at Homestead-Miami. Harmon scored the team's best finish at Daytona, a 24th-place finish after starting nineteenth, seven laps down.

In 2017, the car was sponsored by Veterans Motorsports Inc., a company that provides jobs for veterans. As part of the deal, MHR hired veterans to work for the team.

The team had a carousel of drivers in 2018 and 2019, finishing 40th and 34th, respectively, in owner points.

In 2020, Harmon only ran the plate races in the No. 74 to make way for other drivers to drive his car. Joe Nemechek, Bayley Currey and Kyle Weatherman all drove races for the team's entry, with Currey piloting the car in twenty of the 33.

On January 2, 2021, it was announced that Currey would compete full time in the No. 74, making it the second full-time entry for MHR for 2021. This would be the first time that the team would attempt to run two full-time drivers. (Currey in the No. 74 and Weatherman in the No. 47)

Currey went on to secure a team-best, top-ten finish, by crossing the line in seventh at Phoenix Raceway. However, eleven races later, he was reduced to a part-time capacity when he was replaced by Jesse Iwuji at Pocono. The other drivers of the No. 74 in 2021, were Dawson Cram, Tim Viens, Carson Ware, C. J. McLaughlin, Gray Gaulding, Mike Harmon, and Ryan Ellis. The team finished 40th in owner points.

On November 22, 2021, NASCAR suspended Ryan Bell, the crew chief of the MHR No. 74 car, for the first six races in 2022 for violating the vehicle testing rule when MHR brought the No. 74 car to a charity event at Rockingham Speedway (a track that was no longer on the Truck Series schedule and therefore unsanctioned by NASCAR) and the car was driven around the track. In addition, the team was given a deduction of 75 owner and driver points for the start of the 2022 season. The team would appeal the penalty and lose, although the US$50,000 fine to crew chief Ryan Bell was switched to car owner Mike Harmon. On January 27, 2022, MHR won its final appeal, rescinding Bell's suspension and the monetary fine while still receiving the points deduction.

In 2022, Tim Viens debuted the car at Daytona, but failed to qualify. The No. 74 was not fielded again in 2022, as the team shifted their attention to the No. 47, possibly due to the 75 point hole the No. 74 team had to dig out of.

In 2023, the No. 74 car would attempt to return to full-time competition with Ryan Vargas as the primary driver, however this never materialized. Vargas would only attempt the first three races and fail to qualify all three of them. Dawson Cram then joined the team for Phoenix and Atlanta, finishing 38th and failing to qualify. Argentine driver Baltazar Leguizamón would attempt to qualify the 74 at COTA, but would fail to do so. Cram returned for Richmond, but would fail to qualify. Kaden Honeycutt would successfully qualify at Martinsville, but finish 38th. Team owner Mike Harmon attempted to qualify at Talladega, but would fail for the seventh time in the car's first nine attempts. Cram would then attempt 8 races in the 13-race stretch from Dover to Indianapolis RC, qualifying for two at Charlotte and Michigan, finishing 36th and 28th. Casey Carden will drive the 74 at Watkins Glen.

In 2024, Stanton Barrett would attempt to qualify the No. 74 car for the season opener at Daytona, but would fail to do so. The team would attempt the race at Martinsville with Ryan Vargas behind the wheel, but would again fail to qualify. Jade Buford would attempt three races in the No. 74 but would fail to qualify for each of them. The team managed to qualify for their first race of the season at Pocono with Dawson Cram, after JD Motorsports withdrew their No. 6 entry. However, Cram wrecked on the second lap and finished 38th.

In 2025, Carson Ware would attempt to qualify at Daytona, but was unable to. However, Carson would be able to qualify 35th at Atlanta Motor Speedway and finish 32nd. It was announced that Dawson Cram would be the driver for Phoenix Raceway of the No. 74 SAVE22 and Avail Financial Chevrolet. Dawson Cram would be involved in a late caution that would take him out of the race, finishing 35th. The No. 74 would be sponsored by Realty.com for the next three races, where Cram would qualify for Las Vegas Motor Speedway but DNQ for both Homestead–Miami Speedway and Martinsville Speedway.

In 2026, Cram would attempt to qualify at Atlanta in the No. 74 car. However, he failed to qualify. Prior to the race at Phoenix, the team acquired the owner points from the Alpha Prime Racing No. 4 car. With the newly acquired owner points, Cram managed to qualify for the race. After failed to qualify for the race Las Vegas and Martinsville, the team acquired another owner points. This time it's from the Barrett Cope Racing No. 30 car. Cram managed to qualify for the race at Rockingham and finished 35th. At the next race at Bristol, Gray Gaulding would drive the No. 74 car. Cram would continue to drive the No. 74 at Kansas and Talladega. The team would withdraw the No. 74 for the race at Texas. However, the team formed an alliance with Joey Gase Motorsports to field their No. 35 car.

==== Car No. 74 results ====
Year	Driver	No.	Make	1	2	3	4	5	6	7	8	9	10	11	12	13	14	15	16	17	18	19	20	21	22	23	24	25	26	27	28	29	30	31	32	33	34	Owners	Pts	Ref
2011	Mike Harmon	74	Chevy	DAY	PHO	LVS	BRI	CAL; 43		TAL; 40	NSH; 38	RCH; 37	DAR; 41	DOV; Wth	IOW; 37	CLT; 40	CHI; 39			DAY; 41	KEN; 40	NHA; 37	NSH; 38	IRP; 38	IOW; 36	GLN	CGV		ATL; DNQ	RCH	CHI	DOV	KAN	CLT	TEX	PHO	HOM	48th	80	
2011	J. J. Yeley	74	Chevy						TEX; 40									MCH; 39	ROA									BRI; DNQ										48th	80	
2012	Mike Harmon	74	Chevy	DAY; DNQ	PHO; 39	LVS; 43		CAL; 40		RCH; 41	TAL; 38	DAR; 37	IOW; 35	CLT; 38	DOV; 34	MCH; 43	ROA		DAY; 38	NHA; 36	CHI; 39	IND; DNQ	IOW; 37	GLN	CGV		ATL; 39	RCH; DNQ	CHI; 39	KEN	DOV; DNQ		KAN; 41	TEX	PHO; 36	HOM		45th	120	
2012	David Reutimann	74	Chevy				BRI; DNQ																															45th	120	
2012	Kevin Lepage	74	Chevy						TEX; 42																													45th	120	
2012	Scott Riggs	74	Chevy															KEN; 37																				45th	120	
2012	Rick Crawford	74	Chevy																							BRI; 36												45th	120	
2012	David Green	74	Chevy																													CLT; 39						45th	120	
2013	Mike Harmon	74	Dodge	DAY; 17							TAL; 32								DAY; 31							BRI; DNQ												33rd	368	
2013	Mike Harmon	74	Chevy		PHO; 27		BRI; 28	CAL; 31												NHA; DNQ							ATL; 37											33rd	368	
2013	Kevin Lepage	74	Chevy			LVS; 36			TEX; 28												CHI; 33		IOW; 32						CHI; 36									33rd	368	
2013	Kevin Lepage	74	Dodge																														CLT; 34					33rd	368	
2013	Juan Carlos Blum	74	Chevy							RCH; 29			CLT; 28		IOW; 35	MCH; 30																						33rd	368	
2013	Danny Efland	74	Chevy									DAR; 27		DOV; 27																								33rd	368	
2013	Kevin O'Connell	74	Chevy														ROA; 22								MOH; 34													33rd	368	
2013	Carl Long	74	Chevy															KEN; 28				IND; DNQ		GLN; 31														33rd	368	
2013	Carl Long	74	Dodge																									RCH; DNQ		KEN; 37	DOV; 31	KAN; 34		TEX; 34	PHO; 36	HOM; DNQ		33rd	368	
2014	Mike Harmon	74	Dodge	DAY; 34					TEX; 29	DAR; 33	RCH; 33	TAL; 28	IOW; 38		DOV; 32	MCH; 28			DAY; 39				IOW; 39				ATL; 34		CHI; DNQ	KEN; 38	DOV; DNQ	KAN; 38	CLT; DNQ	TEX; DNQ				37th	264	
2014	Mike Harmon	74	Chevy		PHO; 31																																	37th	264	
2014	Kevin Lepage	74	Dodge			LVS; 34	BRI; 34	CAL; 30						CLT; 39				KEN; DNQ		NHA; 33	CHI; 40	IND; DNQ				BRI; 38		RCH; 40								HOM; DNQ		37th	264	
2014	Bobby Reuse	74	Chevy														ROA; 29								MOH; 24													37th	264	
2014	Roger Reuse	74	Chevy																					GLN; 30														37th	264	
2014	Mike Wallace	74	Dodge																																PHO; 35			37th	264	
2015	Mike Harmon	74	Dodge	DAY; 24	ATL; 37	LVS; 31	PHO; 35	CAL; 35	TEX; 40	BRI; 35	RCH; 39	TAL; DNQ	IOW; 30	CLT; DNQ	DOV; 35	MCH; 32	CHI; 32	DAY; 33	KEN; 30	NHA; 31	IND; 33	IOW; 29					DAR; 34	RCH; 29	CHI; 34	KEN; 27	DOV; 25	CLT; 29	KAN; 38	TEX; 32	PHO; 31	HOM; RL^{‡}		36th	359	
2015	Mike Harmon	74	Chevy																					MOH; 33														36th	359	
2015	Bobby Reuse	74	Chevy																				GLN; 32															36th	359	
2015	Jordan Anderson	74	Dodge																						BRI; 36													36th	359	
2015	Roger Reuse	74	Chevy																							ROA; 31												36th	359	
2015	Tim Viens	74	Dodge																																	HOM; 33		36th	359	
2016	Mike Harmon	74	Dodge	DAY; DNQ	ATL; 30	LVS; 31	PHO; 38	CAL; 32	TEX; 33	BRI; 36	RCH; 36	TAL; DNQ	DOV; 32	CLT; 35	POC; 30	MCH; 29	IOW; 28	DAY; DNQ	KEN; 30	NHA; 30	IND; 35	IOW; 28			BRI; 36		DAR; 31	RCH; 38	CHI; 30	KEN; 24	DOV; 30	CLT; 38	KAN; 30	TEX; 32	PHO; 29	HOM; DNQ		36th	261	
2016	Nicolas Hammann	74	Dodge																				GLN; 28			ROA; 36												36th	261	
2016	Roger Reuse	74	Dodge																					MOH; 33														36th	261	
2017	Mike Harmon	74	Dodge	DAY; DNQ	ATL; DNQ	LVS; DNQ	PHO; 31	CAL; 34	TEX; DNQ	BRI; 30	RCH; 36	TAL; 25		DOV; 25	POC; 34	MCH; 32	IOW; 35	DAY; 23	KEN; 35	NHA; 31	IND; 34	IOW; 31			BRI; 35	ROA	DAR; 35	RCH; 33	CHI; 32	KEN; 34	DOV; 31	CLT; 32	KAN; DNQ	TEX; 32	PHO; 39			41st	140	
2017	Jordan Anderson	74	Dodge										CLT; DNQ																									41st	140	
2017	Cody Ware	74	Dodge																				GLN; 34	MOH; 23														41st	140	
2017	John Graham	74	Dodge																																	HOM; 38		41st	140	
2018	Mike Harmon	74	Dodge	DAY; DNQ							RCH; 36	TAL; 33	DOV; DNQ																			DOV; 35						40th	143	
2018	Mike Harmon	74	Chevy		ATL; DNQ	LVS; 31	PHO; 35	CAL; 40	TEX; DNQ					CLT; DNQ	POC; 33		IOW; 38	CHI; DNQ	DAY; 21	KEN; 30	NHA; 31	IOW; 32					DAR; 27	IND; 26	LVS; 33	RCH; 35	CLT		KAN; 28	TEX; 28	PHO; 32			40th	143	
2018	Cody Ware	74	Dodge							BRI; 30																												40th	143	
2018	B. J. McLeod	74	Chevy													MCH; 28																						40th	143	
2018	Stephen Leicht	74	Dodge																				GLN; DNQ	MOH; 37		ROA; 33												40th	143	
2018	Stephen Leicht	74	Chevy																						BRI; 31													40th	143	
2018	Tim Viens	74	Chevy																																	HOM; DNQ		40th	143	
2019	Mike Harmon	74	Chevy	DAY; 35	ATL; 33	LVS; 30	PHO; 25	CAL; 26	TEX; 29	BRI; 29	RCH; 31	TAL; 23	DOV; 33		POC; 28		IOW; 27		DAY; DNQ	KEN; 27		IOW; 34					DAR; 32	IND; 32				DOV; 34			PHO; 29			34th	261	
2019	Camden Murphy	74	Chevy											CLT; 29				CHI; 31			NHA; DNQ																	34th	261	
2019	Kyle Weatherman	74	Chevy													MCH; 34													LVS; 32				KAN; 22					34th	261	
2019	Dan Corcoran	74	Chevy																				GLN; 25															34th	261	
2019	Aaron Quine	74	Chevy																					MOH; 30														34th	261	
2019	Tyler Matthews	74	Chevy																						BRI; 27					RCH; 33								34th	261	
2019	Nicolas Hammann	74	Chevy																							ROA; 15												34th	261	
2019	Joe Nemechek	74	Chevy																												CLT; 22					HOM; 29		34th	261	
2019	Bayley Currey	74	Chevy																															TEX; 20				34th	261	
2020	Mike Harmon	74	Chevy	DAY; 16										TAL; 25											DAY; 17						TAL; 17							30th	419	
2020	Kyle Weatherman	74	Chevy		LVS; 30	CAL; 34																																30th	419	
2020	Bayley Currey	74	Chevy				PHO; DNQ	DAR; 33	CLT; 18	BRI; 20	ATL; 18	HOM; 24	HOM; 26		POC; 24	IND; 34	KEN; 22	KEN; 25	TEX; 19	KAN; 23	ROA; 37	DAY; 14	DOV; 35	DOV; 33		DAR; 24	RCH; 21	RCH; 19	BRI; 30	LVS; 25			KAN; 18	TEX; 12	MAR; 36	PHO; 15		30th	419	
2020	Gray Gaulding	74	Chevy																													CLT; 28						30th	419	
2021	Bayley Currey	74	Chevy	DAY; 33	DAY; 32	HOM; 35	LVS; 22	PHO; 7	ATL; 24	MAR; 26	TAL; 40	DAR; 25	DOV; 24	COA; DNQ	CLT; DNQ	MOH; 37	TEX; 40	NSH; 30		ROA; DNQ	ATL; 34		GLN; 32	IND; DNQ	MCH; 34				BRI; 34									40th	166	
2021	Jesse Iwuji	74	Chevy																POC; 31																			40th	166	
2021	Dawson Cram	74	Chevy																			NHA; 35																40th	166	
2021	Tim Viens	74	Chevy																							DAY; 29												40th	166	
2021	Carson Ware	74	Chevy																								DAR; 31											40th	166	
2021	C. J. McLaughlin	74	Chevy																									RCH; 40		LVS; 32	TAL; 34		TEX; 35					40th	166	
2021	Gray Gaulding	74	Chevy																													CLT; 40		KAN; 39				40th	166	
2021	Mike Harmon	74	Chevy																																MAR; 39			40th	166	
2021	Ryan Ellis	74	Chevy																																	PHO; DNQ		40th	166	
2022	Tim Viens	74	Chevy	DAY; DNQ	CAL	LVS	PHO	ATL	COA	RCH	MAR	TAL	DOV	DAR	TEX	CLT	PIR	NSH	ROA	ATL	NHA	POC	IND	MCH	GLN	DAY	DAR	KAN	BRI	TEX	TAL	CLT	LVS	HOM	MAR	PHO		64th	-75	
2023	Ryan Vargas	74	Chevy	DAY; DNQ	CAL; DNQ	LVS; DNQ																																47th	25	
2023	Dawson Cram	74	Chevy				PHO; 38	ATL; DNQ		RCH; DNQ			DOV; DNQ	DAR; DNQ	CLT; 36	PIR	SON	NSH; DNQ	CSC; DNQ	ATL	NHA; Wth	POC; DNQ	ROA	MCH; 28	IRC						TEX; 21		LVS; 31	HOM; 36	MAR; Wth			47th	25	
2023	Baltazar Leguizamón	74	Chevy						COA; DNQ																													47th	25	
2023	Kaden Honeycutt	74	Chevy								MAR; 38																											47th	25	
2023	Mike Harmon	74	Chevy									TAL; DNQ																										47th	25	
2023	Casey Carden	74	Chevy																							GLN; DNQ	DAY	DAR	KAN	BRI								47th	25	
2023	Devin Jones	74	Chevy																													ROV; DNQ						47th	25	
2023	Brad Perez	74	Chevy																																	PHO; DNQ		47th	25	
2024	Stanton Barrett	74	Chevy	DAY; DNQ	ATL	LVS	PHO	COA	RCH																													42nd	66	
2024	Ryan Vargas	74	Chevy							MAR; DNQ	TEX	TAL	DOV	DAR																KAN; 29	TAL; Wth	ROV	LVS; 34					42nd	66	
2024	Jade Buford	74	Chevy												CLT; DNQ	PIR	SON	IOW	NHA; DNQ	NSH; DNQ	CSC																	42nd	66	
2024	Dawson Cram	74	Chevy																			POC; 38	IND	MCH		DAR; DNQ	ATL; 37	GLN	BRI; DNQ					HOM; 33				42nd	66	
2024	Tim Viens	74	Chevy																						DAY; 35													42nd	66	
2024	Logan Bearden	74	Chevy																																MAR; 34	PHO		42nd	66	
2025	Carson Ware	74	Chevy	DAY; DNQ	ATL; 32	COA																												TAL; 21	MAR			41st	40	
2025	Dawson Cram	74	Chevy				PHO; 35	LVS; 32	HOM; DNQ	MAR; DNQ	DAR; DNQ	BRI; Wth	CAR; DNQ	TAL	TEX; DNQ	CLT; DNQ	NSH	MXC	POC; 33	ATL	CSC	SON	DOV	IND; 31	IOW; 38	GLN		PIR	GTW; Wth	BRI	KAN	ROV	LVS			PHO; 36		41st	40	
2025	Logan Bearden	74	Chevy																								DAY; Wth											41st	40	
2026	Dawson Cram	74	Chevy	DAY	ATL; DNQ	COA	PHO; 36	LVS; DNQ	DAR; Wth	MAR; DNQ	ROC; 35		KAN; 29	TAL; 34	TEX; Wth	GLN	DOV	CLT	NSH	POC	COR	SON	CHI	ATL	IND	IOW	DAY	DAR	GTW	BRI	LVS	CLT	PHO	TAL	MAR	HOM		40th	70	
2026	Gray Gaulding	74	Chevy									BRI; 28																										40th	70	

=== Car No. 77 history ===
In the 2014 race at Mid-Ohio Sports Car Course, MHR fielded a second car, the No. 77, for Roger Reuse to compete in the race against his brother Bobby in the team's No. 74 car. The car was a late entry on the entry list and therefore did not receive any points.

==== Car No. 77 results ====
Year	Driver	No.	Make	1	2	3	4	5	6	7	8	9	10	11	12	13	14	15	16	17	18	19	20	21	22	23	24	25	26	27	28	29	30	31	32	33	Owners	Pts
2014	Roger Reuse	77	Dodge	DAY	PHO	LVS	BRI	CAL	TEX	DAR	RCH	TAL	IOW	CLT	DOV	MCH	ROA	KEN	DAY	NHA	CHI	IND	IOW	GLN	MOH; 39	BRI	ATL	RCH	CHI	KEN	DOV	KAN	CLT	TEX	PHO	HOM		

=== Car No. 84 history ===
In 2008, the team was renamed Elite 2 Racing, and instead of sharing two numbers with other part-time teams, they used their number, the No. 84 (the No. 48 reversed). Harmon again drove the car in most of the races the team ran, with Carl Long driving at Charlotte in May (although Harmon was originally going to drive the car in that race) and road course ringer Dale Quarterley driving at Montreal and Watkins Glen. Though the team reverted to MHR in 2009, Harmon and Cobb ran the No. 84 entry in that season as well.

==== Car No. 84 results ====
Year	Driver	No.	Make	1	2	3	4	5	6	7	8	9	10	11	12	13	14	15	16	17	18	19	20	21	22	23	24	25	26	27	28	29	30	31	32	33	34	35	Owners	Pts
2008	Mike Harmon	84	Chevy	DAY; DNQ	CAL; 40	LVS; DNQ	ATL; 40	BRI; 40	NSH; 36	TEX; 43	PHO; 40	MXC	TAL; 17	RCH; Wth	DAR; 37		DOV; 43	NSH	KEN	MLW; DNQ	NHA; 42	DAY; 39	CHI; Wth		IRP; Wth				BRI; DNQ	CAL; DNQ	RCH	DOV	KAN; DNQ	CLT	MEM; Wth	TEX; DNQ	PHO	HOM		
2008	Carl Long	84	Chevy													CLT; 42																								
2008	Dale Quarterley	84	Chevy																							CGV; 42	GLN; 41	MCH												
2008	Kevin Lepage	84	Chevy																					GTY; DNQ																
2009	Mike Harmon	84	Chevy	DAY; 29	CAL; DNQ	LVS; DNQ	BRI; Wth	TEX; DNQ	NSH; DNQ	PHO; DNQ	TAL; DNQ	RCH; DNQ	DAR; 37	CLT; DNQ	DOV; Wth	NSH; Wth	KEN	MLW	NHA	DAY; Wth	CHI	GTY	IRP	IOW	GLN	MCH	BRI	CGV	ATL	RCH	DOV	KAN	CAL	CLT						
2009	Mike Harmon	84	Dodge																																MEM; Wth	TEX; DNQ	PHO			
2009	Jennifer Jo Cobb	84	Dodge																																			HOM; DNQ		

=== Car No. 87 history ===
During 2014 Dover 200, Harmon failed to qualify in his No. 74 Dodge. As the results, Harmon took over Rick Ware Racing's No. 87 car for the race. He finished 39th.

==== Car No. 87 results ====
Year	Driver	No.	Make	1	2	3	4	5	6	7	8	9	10	11	12	13	14	15	16	17	18	19	20	21	22	23	24	25	26	27	28	29	30	31	32	33	Owners	Pts
2014	Mike Harmon	87	Dodge	DAY	PHO	LVS	BRI	CAL	TEX	DAR	RCH	TAL	IOW	CLT	DOV	MCH	ROA	KEN	DAY	NHA	CHI	IND	IOW	GLN	MOH	BRI	ATL	RCH	CHI	KEN	DOV; 39	KAN	CLT	TEX	PHO	HOM		

== NASCAR Craftsman Truck Series ==
=== Truck No. 1 history ===
In 2017, MHR partnered with TJL Motorsports to field the No. 1 truck for Harmon at Talldega.

==== Truck No. 1 results ====
Year	Driver	No.	Make	1	2	3	4	5	6	7	8	9	10	11	12	13	14	15	16	17	18	19	20	21	22	23	Owners	Pts
2017	Mike Harmon	1	Chevy	DAY	ATL	MAR	KAN	CLT	DOV	TEX	GTW	IOW	KEN	ELD	POC	MCH	BRI	MSP	CHI	NHA	LVS	TAL; 20	MAR	TEX	PHO	HOM		

=== Truck No. 42 history ===
The team debuted their truck series program with the No. 42 in 2009. Harmon drove for four races, though he failed to qualify at Talladega.

==== Truck No. 42 results ====
Year	Driver	No.	Make	1	2	3	4	5	6	7	8	9	10	11	12	13	14	15	16	17	18	19	20	21	22	23	24	25	Owners	Pts
2009	Mike Harmon	42	Chevy	DAY	CAL	ATL	MAR	KAN	CLT	DOV	TEX	MCH	MLW	MEM; 33	KEN	IRP	NSH	BRI	CHI	IOW	GTY	NHA; 31	LVS; 25	MAR						
2009	Mike Harmon	42	Dodge																						TAL; DNQ	TEX	PHO	HOM		

=== Truck No. 49 history ===
In 2015, the team fielded an additional part-time entry by running the No. 49 truck. Harmon drove the truck at Texas, and Cassie Gannis attempted to make her series debut at Phoenix, but failed to qualify.

==== Truck No. 49 results ====
Year	Driver	No.	Make	1	2	3	4	5	6	7	8	9	10	11	12	13	14	15	16	17	18	19	20	21	22	23	Owners	Pts
2015	Mike Harmon	49	Chevy	DAY	ATL	MAR	KAN	CLT	DOV	TEX	GTW	IOW	KEN	ELD	POC	MCH	BRI	MSP	CHI	NHA	LVS	TAL	MAR	TEX; 30				
2015	Cassie Gannis	49	Ram																						PHO; DNQ	HOM		

=== Truck No. 66 history ===
In 2016, MHR fielded the No. 66 truck for Tim Viens at Las Vegas and Josh Reeves at Martinsville. This truck was fielded using Bolen Motorsports owner points.

==== Truck No. 66 results ====
Year	Driver	No.	Make	1	2	3	4	5	6	7	8	9	10	11	12	13	14	15	16	17	18	19	20	21	22	23	Owners	Pts
2016	Tim Viens	66	Chevy	DAY	ATL	MAR	KAN	DOV	CLT	TEX	IOW	GTW	KEN	ELD	POC	BRI	MCH	MSP	CHI	NHA	LVS; 29	TAL						
2016	Josh Reeves	66	Chevy																				MAR; 28	TEX	PHO	HOM		

=== Truck No. 74 history ===
The team debuted the No. 74 truck in 2011, with Harmon as the driver. The team attempted seven races

The following year several drivers got behind the wheel, including Wheeler Boys, Rick Crawford, Brian Weber, Scott Riggs, and Tim Andrews. Harmon himself attempted another seven races in the truck.

Two years later in 2014, Harmon made three starts, with Wendell Chavous making two additional starts at Martinsville and Phoenix, and Jordan Anderson made the final start at Homestead.

In 2015, Anderson returned to the truck for nineteen races. He failed to qualify twice at Daytona and Bristol. Paige Decker attempted both Martinsville races, failing to qualify at the spring Martinsville race. Tim Viens made a start at Dover and Stew Hayward made a start at Eldora Speedway, finishing 32nd with an engine failure.

In 2016, Harmon made five starts, but he failed to qualify for three races and withdrew from a race at Talladega. Viens failed to qualify at Atlanta but made the race at New Hampshire. Decker returned to drive the No. 74 at Martinsville. Anderson made a single start at Phoenix.

In 2017, Anderson attempted to make the season opener at Daytona but he failed to qualify. Joe Hudson made a start at Canadian Tire, finishing 27th after a brake failure. Harmon attempted three starts in the truck which included a withdraw from a race at Homestead–Miami Speedway.

In 2018, Harmon made nine starts but he failed to qualify for two races at Martinsville and Texas. He also withdrew from the race at Las Vegas Motor Speedway. B. J. McLeod made one start at Pocono.

In 2025, Dawson Cram and Caleb Costner were announced to be driving the No. 74 Toyota at Pocono Raceway and Richmond Raceway respectively. Cram would place 32nd in their first race back at Pocono. Boston Oliver would drive the No. 74 at Indianapolis Raceway Park. He started in 34th after qualifying was cancelled due to rain, and finished in 33rd due to handling issues.

==== Truck No. 74 results ====
Year	Driver	No.	Make	1	2	3	4	5	6	7	8	9	10	11	12	13	14	15	16	17	18	19	20	21	22	23	24	25	Owners	Pts
2011	Mike Harmon	74	Ford	DAY	PHO	DAR	MAR	NSH	DOV	CLT	KAN	TEX	KEN	IOW	NSH	IRP	POC	MCH; 32	BRI	ATL	CHI; 36	NHA; 33	KEN; 35	LVS						
2011	Mike Harmon	74	Chevy																						TAL; DNQ	MAR	TEX; 30	HOM; 33		
2012	Wheeler Boys	74	Chevy	DAY; DNQ																										
2012	Rick Crawford	74	Chevy		MAR; 36																									
2012	Brian Weber	74	Chevy			CAR; DNQ																		PHO; 26						
2012	Scott Riggs	74	Chevy				KAN; DNQ	CLT						POC; 32			ATL; 33	IOW					TEX; 34							
2012	Mike Harmon	74	Chevy						DOV; 34	TEX; 33	KEN	IOW	CHI; DNQ		MCH; 28	BRI					TAL; 35	MAR			HOM; DNQ					
2012	Tim Andrews	74	Chevy																KEN; DNQ	LVS										
2014	Mike Harmon	74	Chevy	DAY	MAR	KAN	CLT	DOV	TEX	GTW	KEN	IOW	ELD	POC	MCH	BRI	MSP	CHI; 32	NHA	LVS	TAL; 36		TEX; 27							
2014	Wendell Chavous	74	Chevy																			MAR; 27		PHO; 27						
2014	Jordan Anderson	74	Chevy																						HOM; 30					
2015	Jordan Anderson	74	Chevy	DAY; DNQ	ATL; 23		KAN; 18	CLT; 23		TEX; 24	GTW; 19	IOW; 22	KEN; 28		POC; 18	MCH; 13	BRI; DNQ	MSP; 16	CHI; 20	NHA; 25	LVS; 22	TAL; 19		TEX; 21	PHO; 29	HOM; 29				
2015	Paige Decker	74	Chevy			MAR; DNQ																								
2015	Paige Decker	74	Ram																				MAR; 30							
2015	Tim Viens	74	Chevy						DOV; 23																					
2015	Stew Hayward	74	Ram											ELD; 32																
2016	Mike Harmon	74	Chevy	DAY; DNQ			KAN; DNQ	DOV	CLT	TEX	IOW	GTW	KEN; 29	ELD	POC	BRI	MCH	MSP	CHI					TEX; DNQ						
2016	Tim Viens	74	Chevy		ATL; DNQ															NHA; 26	LVS	TAL	MAR							
2016	Paige Decker	74	Ram			MAR; 25																								
2016	Jordan Anderson	74	Chevy																						PHO; 29	HOM				
2017	Jordan Anderson	74	Chevy	DAY; DNQ	ATL	MAR	KAN	CLT	DOV	TEX	GTW	IOW	KEN	ELD	POC	MCH	BRI													
2017	Joe Hudson	74	Chevy															MSP; 27												
2017	Mike Harmon	74	Chevy																CHI; 27	NHA	LVS	TAL	MAR	TEX	PHO; 28	HOM				
2018	Cody Ware	74	Chevy	DAY; DNQ																										
2018	Tim Viens	74	Chevy		ATL; DNQ																									
2018	Mike Harmon	74	Chevy			LVS; 22	MAR; DNQ	DOV; 24	KAN; 24	CLT; 29	TEX; DNQ			CHI; 32	KEN					MSP; 31	LVS; Wth	TAL	MAR	TEX	PHO	HOM				
2018	Bryant Barnhill	74	Chevy									IOW; DNQ																		
2018	B. J. McLeod	74	Chevy										GTW; DNQ				POC; 24	MCH	BRI											
2018	Trevor Collins	74	Chevy													ELD; DNQ														
2025	Dawson Cram	74	Toyota	DAY	ATL	LVS	HOM	MAR	BRI	CAR	TEX	KAN	NWS	CLT	NSH	MCH	POC; 32	LRP											42nd	48
2025	Boston Oliver	74	Toyota																IRP; 33	GLN									42nd	48
2025	Caleb Costner	74	Toyota																		RCH; 30	DAR; 28	BRI; 35	NHA; 33	ROV	TAL; 35	MAR		42nd	48
2025	Caleb Costner	74	Chevy																									PHO; 22	42nd	48

=== Truck No. 84 history ===
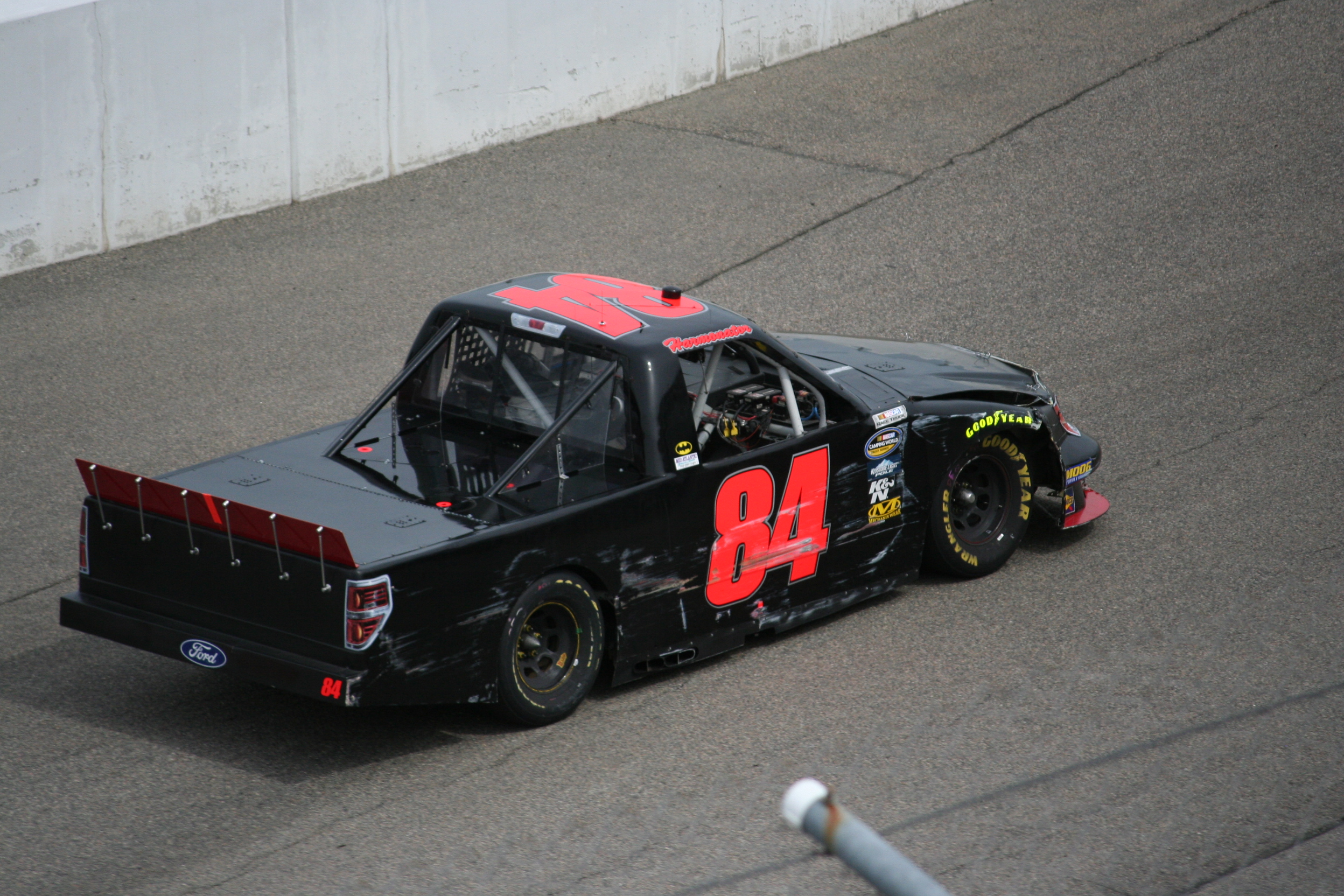
Harmon driving the No. 84 for Glenden Enterprises at Rockingham in 2013

In 2013, the team fielded the No. 84 truck in partnership with Glenden Enterprises. Robert Bruce drove the 84 truck at Martinsville. Harmon made 13 starts in the 84 truck but he failed to qualify for one race at Bristol.

==== Truck No. 84 results ====
Year	Driver	No.	Make	1	2	3	4	5	6	7	8	9	10	11	12	13	14	15	16	17	18	19	20	21	22	Owners	Pts
2013	Robert Bruce	84	Ford	DAY	MAR; 28																						
2013	Mike Harmon	84	Ford			CAR; 36																					
2013	Mike Harmon	84	Chevy				KAN; 33	CLT; 24	DOV; 32	TEX	KEN	IOW	ELD	POC; 25	MCH; 23	BRI; DNQ	MSP	IOW; 34	CHI; 31	LVS; 25	TAL; 22	MAR	TEX; 31	PHO; 34	HOM		

=== Truck No. 86 history ===
In 2016, Brandonbilt Motorsports developed an alliance with MHR, resulting in Tim Viens running one race for the team.

==== Truck No. 86 results ====
Year	Driver	No.	Make	1	2	3	4	5	6	7	8	9	10	11	12	13	14	15	16	17	18	19	20	21	22	23	Owners	Pts
2016	Tim Viens	86	Chevy	DAY	ATL	MAR	KAN	DOV	CLT	TEX; 29	IOW	GTW	KEN	ELD	POC	BRI	MCH	MSP	CHI	NHA	LVS	TAL	MAR	TEX	PHO	HOM		

== ARCA Menards Series ==
=== Car No. 06 history ===
In 2013, MHR fielded the No. 06 Chevrolet for Dexter Stacey at Daytona. He started 39th and finished 20th.

==== Car No. 06 results ====
Year	Driver	No.	Make	1	2	3	4	5	6	7	8	9	10	11	12	13	14	15	16	17	18	19	20	21	Owners	Pts
2013	Dexter Stacey	06	Chevy	DAY; 20	MOB	SLM	TAL	TOL	ELK	POC	MCH	ROA	WIN	CHI	NJM	POC	BLN	ISF	MAD	DSF	IOW	SLM	KEN	KAN		

=== Car No. 24 history ===
In 2008, MHR fielded the No. 24 Chevy full-time for Harmon. Jim Walker drove the No. 24 at Kentucky.

In 2009, Harmon drove the No. 24 at Daytona and Talladega.

==== Car No. 24 results ====
Year	Driver	No.	Make	1	2	3	4	5	6	7	8	9	10	11	12	13	14	15	16	17	18	19	20	21	Owners	Pts
2008	Mike Harmon	24	Chevy	DAY; 12	SLM; 21	IOW; 14	KAN; 28	CAR; 18	KEN; 36	TOL; DNQ	POC; 27	MCH; 34	CAY; 10		BLN; 18	POC; 19	NSH; 36	ISF; 22	DSF; 28	CHI; 33	SLM; 24	NJE; 35	TAL; 15	TOL; DNQ		
2008	Jim Walker	24	Chevy											KEN; 35												
2009	Mike Harmon	24	Chevy	DAY; 12	SLM	CAR	TAL; 36	KEN	TOL	POC	MCH	MFD	IOW	KEN	BLN	POC	ISF	CHI	TOL	DSF	NJE	SLM	KAN	CAR		

=== Car No. 31 history ===
In 2012, MHR fielded the No. 31 Ford for Harmon at Daytona and Talladega.

==== Car No. 31 results ====
Year	Driver	No.	Make	1	2	3	4	5	6	7	8	9	10	11	12	13	14	15	16	17	18	19	20	21	Owners	Pts
2012	Mike Harmon	31	Ford	DAY; 32	MOB	SLM	TAL; 39	TOL	ELK	POC	MCH	WIN	NJE	IOW	CHI	IRP	POC	BLN	ISF	MAD	SLM	DSF	KAN			

=== Car No. 38 history ===
Harmon drove the No. 38 for Oostlander Racing full-time in 2006. He bought the team after the first two races of the 2007 season and it became Richardson-Netzloff-Harmon Racing starting at Nashville. He finished the season with one top-ten race finish at Pocono.

==== Car No. 38 results ====
Year	Driver	No.	Make	1	2	3	4	5	6	7	8	9	10	11	12	13	14	15	16	17	18	19	20	21	22	23	Owners	Pts
2007	Mike Harmon	38	Chevy	DAY	USA	NSH; 27	SLM; 14	KAN; 24	WIN; 32	KEN; 18	TOL; 34	IOW; 17	POC; 16	MCH; 23	BLN; 20	KEN; 27	POC; 10	NSH; 24	ISF; 38	MIL; 31	GTW; 19	DSF; 26	CHI; 17	SLM; 19	TAL; DNQ	TOL; 17		

=== Car No. 47 history ===
In 2024, Mixon Racing fielded the No. 47 Toyota in collaboration with MHR for Becca Monopoli at Daytona. She ultimately failed to qualify after setting the 46th fastest time in qualifying.

==== Car No. 47 results ====
Year	Driver	No.	Make	1	2	3	4	5	6	7	8	9	10	11	12	13	14	15	16	17	18	19	20	Owners	Pts
2024	Becca Monopoli	47	Toyota	DAY; DNQ	PHO	TAL	DOV	KAN	CLT	IOW	MOH	BLN	IRP	SLM	ELK	MCH	ISF	MLW	DSF	GLN	BRI	KAN	TOL		

=== Car No. 78 history ===
The team debuted in what was then the ARCA Re/Max Series in 2005 at the July Pocono race with Art Seeger driving the No. 78 car.

==== Car No. 78 results ====
Year	Driver	No.	Make	1	2	3	4	5	6	7	8	9	10	11	12	13	14	15	16	17	18	19	20	21	22	23	Owners	Pts
2005	Art Seeger	78	Pontiac	DAY	NSH	SLM	KEN	TOL	LAN	MIL	POC	MCH	KAN	KEN	BLN	POC; 19	GTW	LER	NSH	MCH	ISF	TOL	DSF	CHI	SLM	TAL		

=== Car No. 94 history ===
In 2007, RNH partnered with Darrell Basham Racing to field Ricky Gonzalez in their No. 94 car at Milwaukee and Gateway.

==== Car No. 94 results ====
Year	Driver	No.	Make	1	2	3	4	5	6	7	8	9	10	11	12	13	14	15	16	17	18	19	20	21	22	23	Owners	Pts
2007	Ricky Gonzalez	94	Chevy	DAY	USA	NSH	SLM	KAN	WIN	KEN	TOL	IOW	POC	MCH	BLN	KEN	POC	NSH	ISF	MIL; 18	GTW	DSF	CHI	SLM	TAL	TOL		
