= Bobby Reuse =

American racing driver (born 1970)

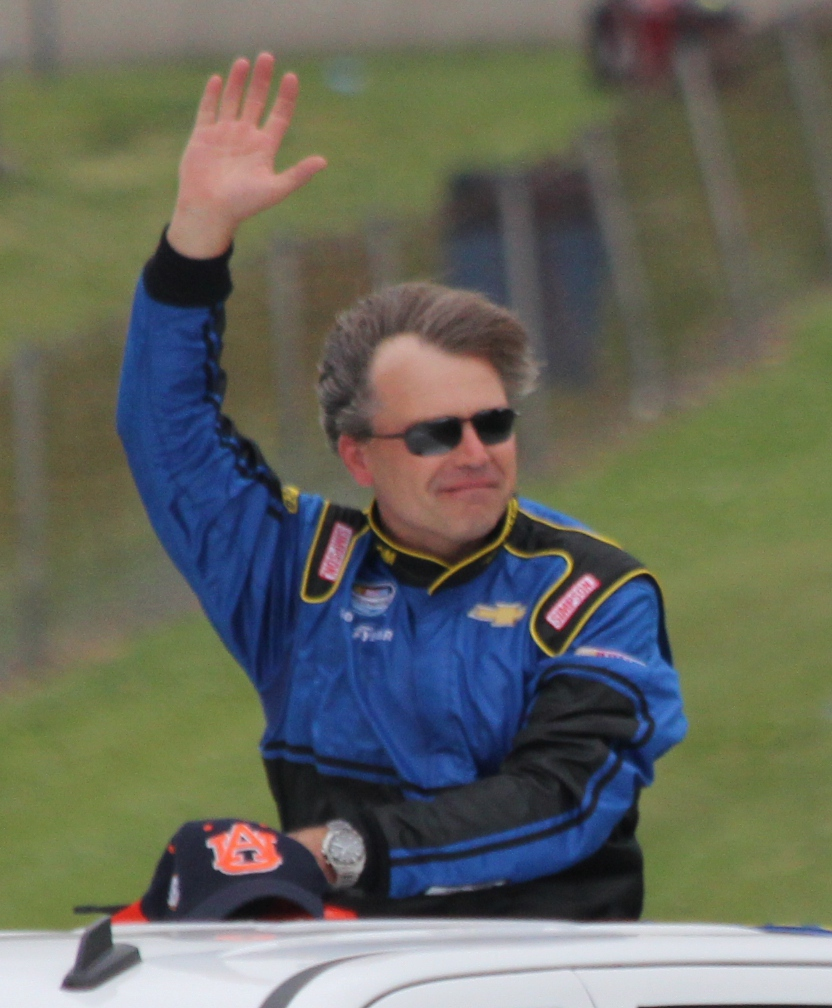
- Reuse in 2014
- Born: Robert James Reuse; May 18, 1970 (age 56); Birmingham, Alabama, U.S.

NASCAR O'Reilly Auto Parts Series career
- 4 races run over 3 years
- 2020 position: 65th
- Best finish: 59th (2014)
- First race: 2014 Gardner Denver 200 (Road America)
- Last race: 2020 UNOH 188 (Daytona RC)
| Wins | Top tens | Poles |
|---|---|---|
| 0 | 0 | 0 |

NASCAR FedEx Freight Truck Series career
- 5 races run over 4 years
- 2021 position: 71st
- Best finish: 59th (2017)
- First race: 2017 Chevrolet Silverado 250 (Mosport)
- Last race: 2021 United Rentals 176 (Watkins Glen)
| Wins | Top tens | Poles |
|---|---|---|
| 0 | 0 | 0 |
- Statistics up to date as of December 30, 2021.

Robert James Reuse (born May 18, 1970) is an American professional sports car racing and stock car racing driver. He has raced in the Trans-Am Series, NASCAR Xfinity Series, and NASCAR Camping World Truck Series.

In Trans-Am, he and his brother Roger Reuse operate the GT2 team Reuse Brothers Racing. He last competed part-time in the NASCAR Camping World Truck Series for Jordan Anderson Racing, driving the No. 3 Chevrolet Silverado.

== Racing career ==
=== NASCAR Xfinity Series ===
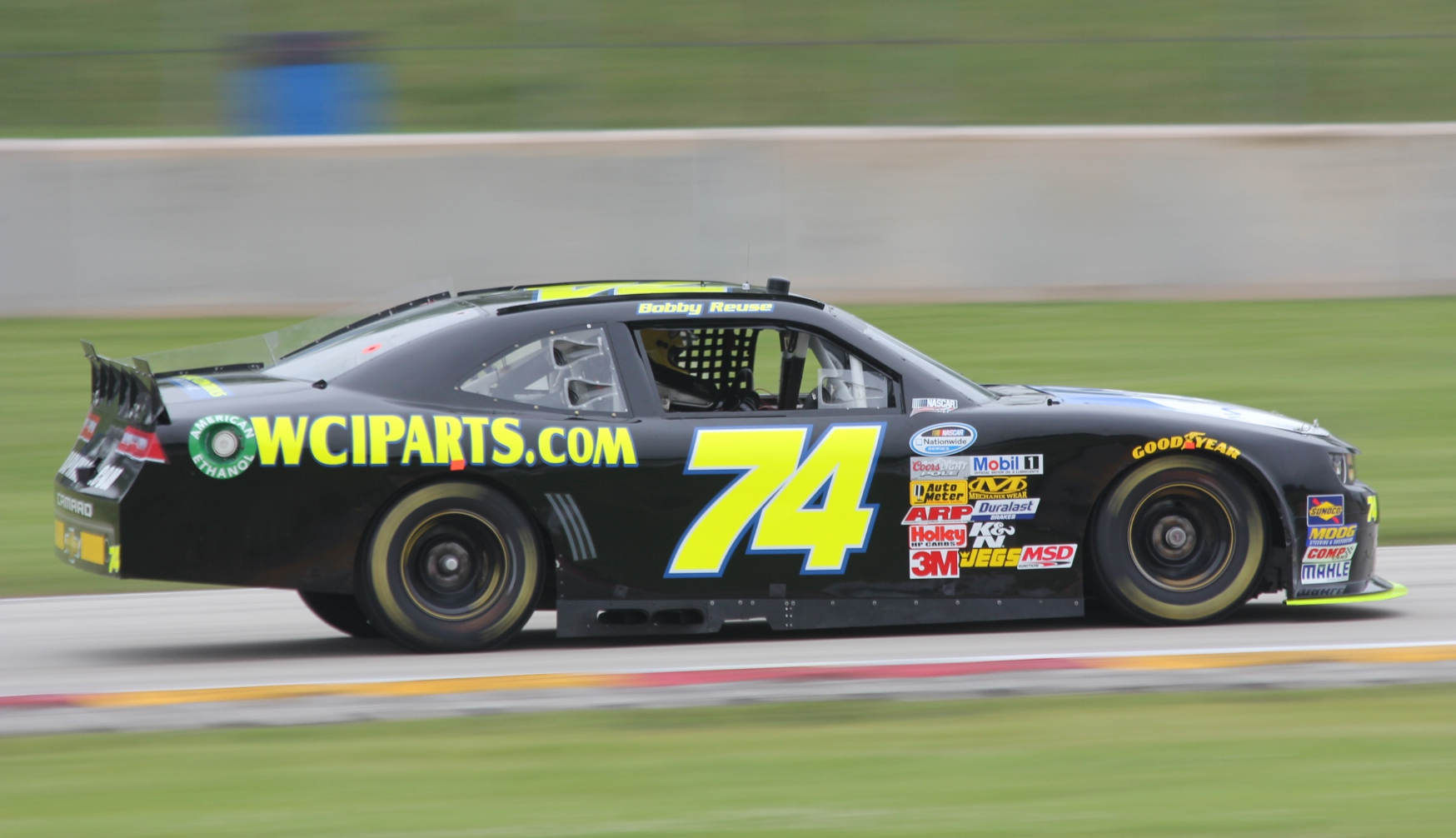
Reuse racing at Road America in 2014

In 2014, Reuse and his brother Roger made their NASCAR debut. Reuse drove the No. 74 Chevrolet for Mike Harmon Racing. He started 31st and finished 29th due to engine problems in his first race. In his next and final race of the season, Reuse started 34th and finished 24th.

In 2015, Reuse returned to Mike Harmon Racing in the Xfinity Series for the Watkins Glen race. He started 39th and finished 32nd.

After a five-year absence from the Xfinity Series, Reuse made his return in August 2020 for the UNOH 188 at the Daytona International Speedway road course in the No. 13 for MBM Motorsports.

=== NASCAR Truck Series ===
In 2017, Reuse made his debut in the Truck Series, driving the No. 50 Chevrolet Silverado for Beaver Motorsports at Bowmanville. He started 27th and finished 17th.

For 2018, Reuse ran the Iowa race in the No. 15 Chevrolet Silverado for Jordan Anderson Racing. He started 32nd and finished 25th due to suspension problems.

For 2019, Reuse returned for Bowmanville's race driving the No. 56 Chevrolet Silverado for Jordan Anderson Racing using Hill Motorsports' owners points. He started 23rd and finished 22nd. His brother Roger drove the No. 04 Chevrolet Silverado for the same team in the same race.

In 2020, Reuse joined Clay Greenfield Motorsports for the Sunoco 159 at the Daytona road course, but the team withdrew as the transfer of the truck's chassis from Jordan Anderson Racing to CGM was not properly submitted for NASCAR approval.

During his post-race interview following the 2021 season opener at Daytona, Jordan Anderson announced Reuse would drive for JAR in the following week's event on Daytona's road course.

== Personal life ==
Reuse and his older brother Roger owned Alabama Controls, Inc., an energy and security company founded by their father in 1975.

== Motorsports career results ==
=== NASCAR ===
(key) (Bold – Pole position awarded by qualifying time. Italics – Pole position earned by points standings or practice time. * – Most laps led.)

==== Xfinity Series ====
NASCAR Xfinity Series results
| Year | Team | No. | Make | 1 | 2 | 3 | 4 | 5 | 6 | 7 | 8 | 9 | 10 | 11 | 12 | 13 | 14 | 15 | 16 | 17 | 18 | 19 | 20 | 21 | 22 | 23 | 24 | 25 | 26 | 27 | 28 | 29 | 30 | 31 | 32 | 33 | NXSC | Pts | Ref |
|---|---|---|---|---|---|---|---|---|---|---|---|---|---|---|---|---|---|---|---|---|---|---|---|---|---|---|---|---|---|---|---|---|---|---|---|---|---|---|---|
| 2014 | Mike Harmon Racing | 74 | Chevy | DAY | PHO | LVS | BRI | CAL | TEX | DAR | RCH | TAL | IOW | CLT | DOV | MCH | ROA; 29 | KEN | DAY | NHA | CHI | IND | IOW | GLN | MOH; 24 | BRI | ATL | RCH | CHI | KEN | DOV | KAN | CLT | TEX | PHO | HOM | 59th | 35 | |
| 2015 | Mike Harmon Racing | 74 | Chevy | DAY | ATL | LVS | PHO | CAL | TEX | BRI | RCH | TAL | IOW | CLT | DOV | MCH | CHI | DAY | KEN | NHA | IND | IOW | GLN; 32 | MOH | BRI | ROA | DAR | RCH | CHI | KEN | DOV | CLT | KAN | TEX | PHO | HOM | 77th | 12 | |
| 2020 | MBM Motorsports | 13 | Toyota | DAY | LVS | CAL | PHO | DAR | CLT | BRI | ATL | HOM | HOM | TAL | POC | IND | KEN | KEN | TEX | KAN | ROA | DAY; 30 | DOV | DOV | DAY | DAR | RCH | RCH | BRI | LVS | TAL | CLT | KAN | TEX | MAR | PHO | 65th | 7 | |

==== Camping World Truck Series ====
NASCAR Camping World Truck Series results
| Year | Team | No. | Make | 1 | 2 | 3 | 4 | 5 | 6 | 7 | 8 | 9 | 10 | 11 | 12 | 13 | 14 | 15 | 16 | 17 | 18 | 19 | 20 | 21 | 22 | 23 | NCWTC | Pts | Ref |
|---|---|---|---|---|---|---|---|---|---|---|---|---|---|---|---|---|---|---|---|---|---|---|---|---|---|---|---|---|---|
| 2017 | Beaver Motorsports | 50 | Chevy | DAY | ATL | MAR | KAN | DOV | CLT | TEX | IOW | GTW | KEN | ELD | POC | BRI | MCH | MSP; 17 | CHI | NHA | LVS | TAL | MAR | TEX | PHO | HOM | 59th | 20 | |
| 2018 | Jordan Anderson Racing | 15 | Chevy | DAY | ATL | LVS | MAR | DOV | KAN | CLT | TEX | IOW; 25 | GTW | CHI | KEN | ELD | POC | MCH | BRI | MSP | LVS | TAL | MAR | TEX | PHO | HOM | 77th | 12 | |
| 2019 | Jordan Anderson Racing | 56 | Chevy | DAY | ATL | LVS | MAR | TEX | DOV | KAN | CLT | TEX | IOW | GTW | CHI | KEN | POC | ELD | MCH | BRI | MSP; 22 | LVS | TAL | MAR | PHO | HOM | 79th | 15 | |
| 2020 | Clay Greenfield Motorsports | 68 | Toyota | DAY | LVS | CLT | ATL | HOM | POC | KEN | TEX | KAN | KAN | MCH | DRC; Wth | DOV | GTW | DAR | RCH | BRI | LVS | TAL | KAN | TEX | MAR | PHO | N/A | N/A | |
| 2021 | Jordan Anderson Racing | 3 | Chevy | DAY | DAY; 27 | LVS | ATL | BRI | RCH | KAN | DAR | COA | CLT | TEX | NSH | POC | KNX | GLN; 29 | GTW | DAR | BRI | LVS | TAL | MAR | PHO | | 71st | 18 | |

^{*} Season still in progress
^{1} Ineligible for series points

=== IHRA Pro Late Model Series ===
(key) (Bold – Pole position awarded by qualifying time. Italics – Pole position earned by points standings or practice time. * – Most laps led. ** – All laps led.)

IHRA Pro Late Model Series
| Year | Team | No. | Make | 1 | 2 | 3 | ISCSS | Pts | Ref |
|---|---|---|---|---|---|---|---|---|---|
| 2026 | Adventures in Racing | 88 | Chevy | DUB; 8 | CDL | AND | N/A | 0 | |
