= Joe Hudson (racing driver) =

American racing driver (born 1965)

- Born: May 1, 1965 (age 61); Alabaster, Alabama, U.S.

NASCAR FedEx Freight Truck Series career
- 1 race run over 1 year
- 2017 position: 72nd
- Best finish: 72nd (2017)
- First race: 2017 Chevrolet Silverado 250 (Mosport)
Wins	Top tens	Poles
0	0	0
- Statistics up to date as of August 16, 2018.

Joe Hudson (born May 1, 1965) is an American professional stock car racing driver. He last competed part-time in the Camping World Truck Series, driving the No. 74 Chevrolet Silverado for Mike Harmon Racing.

== Racing career ==
=== Camping World Truck Series ===
Hudson made his first and only Camping World Truck Series start at Canadian Tire Motorsport Park, driving the No. 74 truck for Mike Harmon Racing. He started 32nd and finished 27th after a brake failure.

== Motorsports career results ==
=== NASCAR ===
(key) (Bold – Pole position awarded by qualifying time. Italics – Pole position earned by points standings or practice time. * – Most laps led.)

==== Camping World Truck Series ====
NASCAR Camping World Truck Series results
Year	Team	No.	Make	1	2	3	4	5	6	7	8	9	10	11	12	13	14	15	16	17	18	19	20	21	22	23	NCWTC	Pts	Ref
2017	Mike Harmon Racing	74	Chevy	DAY	ATL	MAR	KAN	CLT	DOV	TEX	GTW	IOW	KEN	ELD	POC	MCH	BRI	MSP; 27	CHI	NHA	LVS	TAL	MAR	TEX	PHO	HOM	72nd	10	

^{*} Season still in progress
^{1} Ineligible for series points
