= 2016 Fred's 250 =

19th race of the 2016 NASCAR Camping World Truck Series

2016 fred's 250 Powered by Coca-Cola
Race details
- Race 19 of 23 of the 2016 NASCAR Camping World Truck Series
- Date: October 22, 2016
- Official name: 11th Annual fred's 250 Powered by Coca-Cola
- Location: Talladega Superspeedway, Lincoln, Alabama
- Course: Permanent racing facility
- Course length: 2.66 miles (4.28 km)
- Distance: 94 laps, 250 mi (402 km)
- Scheduled distance: 94 laps, 250 mi (402 km)
- Average speed: 143.163 mph (230.399 km/h)

Pole position
Driver	Cole Custer	JR Motorsports
- Time: 53.672

Most laps led
Driver	Grant Enfinger	GMS Racing
- Laps: 45

Winner
No. 24	Grant Enfinger	GMS Racing

Television in the United States
- Network: Fox
- Announcers: Vince Welch, Phil Parsons, and Michael Waltrip

Radio in the United States
- Radio: MRN

The 2016 Fred's 250 Powered by Coca-Cola was the 19th stock car race of the 2016 NASCAR Camping World Truck Series, the final race of the Round of 8, and the 11th iteration of the event. The race was held on Saturday, October 22, 2016, in Lincoln, Alabama, at Talladega Superspeedway, a 2.66-mile (4.28 km) permanent tri-oval shaped superspeedway. The race took the scheduled 94 laps to complete. Grant Enfinger, driving for GMS Racing, pulled off the upset win, after holding off Spencer Gallagher on the final lap. It was Enfinger's first career NASCAR Camping World Truck Series win. To fill out the podium, Timothy Peters, driving for Red Horse Racing, would finish in 3rd, respectively.

The six drivers that advanced into the Round of 6 are William Byron, Christopher Bell, Timothy Peters, Ben Kennedy, Johnny Sauter, and Matt Crafton. Daniel Hemric and John Hunter Nemechek would be eliminated from championship contention.

== Background ==
The layout of Talladega Superspeedway, the venue where the race was held.

Talladega Superspeedway, nicknamed “'Dega”, and formerly named Alabama International Motor Speedway (AIMS) from 1969 to 1989, is a motorsports complex located north of Talladega, Alabama. It is located on the former Anniston Air Force Base in the small city of Lincoln. A tri-oval, the track was constructed in 1969 by the International Speedway Corporation, a business controlled by the France Family. As of 2021, the track hosts the NASCAR Cup Series, NASCAR Xfinity Series, NASCAR Camping World Truck Series, and ARCA Menards Series. Talladega is the longest NASCAR oval, with a length of 2.66 miles (4.281 km), compared to the Daytona International Speedway, which is 2.5 miles (4.0 km) long. The total peak capacity of Talladega is around 175,000 spectators, with the main grandstand capacity being about 80,000.

=== Entry list ===
- (R) denotes rookie driver.
- (i) denotes driver who is ineligible for series driver points.

#	Driver	Team	Make	Sponsor
00	Cole Custer (R)	JR Motorsports	Chevrolet	OneMain Financial
1	Jennifer Jo Cobb	Jennifer Jo Cobb Racing	Chevrolet	V. G. Pride Group
02	Dylan Lupton (i)	Young's Motorsports	Chevrolet	Randco, Young's Building Systems
2	Austin Cindric	Brad Keselowski Racing	Ford	Pirtek
4	Christopher Bell (R)	Kyle Busch Motorsports	Toyota	SiriusXM
05	John Wes Townley	Athenian Motorsports	Chevrolet	Synovus, Jive, Everfi
5	Korbin Forrister	Wauters Motorsports	Toyota	All Secure
07	Cody Ware (i)	SS-Green Light Racing	Chevrolet	Lilly Trucking
8	John Hunter Nemechek	NEMCO Motorsports	Chevrolet	Fire Alarm Services
9	William Byron (R)	Kyle Busch Motorsports	Toyota	Liberty University
10	Clay Greenfield	Jennifer Jo Cobb Racing	Chevrolet	1-800-PAVEMENT
11	Matt Tifft (R)	Red Horse Racing	Toyota	Brain Gear, Surface Sunscreen
13	Cameron Hayley	ThorSport Racing	Toyota	Ride TV, Cabinets by Hayley
17	Timothy Peters	Red Horse Racing	Toyota	Red Horse Racing
19	Daniel Hemric	Brad Keselowski Racing	Ford	DrawTite
21	Johnny Sauter	GMS Racing	Chevrolet	Smokey Mountain Herbal Snuff
22	Austin Wayne Self (R)	AM Racing	Toyota	Trump Pence 2016
23	Spencer Gallagher	GMS Racing	Chevrolet	Allegiant Travel Company
24	Grant Enfinger (R)	GMS Racing	Chevrolet	Plugfones
29	Tyler Reddick	Brad Keselowski Racing	Ford	Cooper-Standard Automotive
33	Ben Kennedy	GMS Racing	Chevrolet	Jacob Companies
36	Bobby Gerhart (i)	Bobby Gerhart Racing	Chevrolet	Lucas Oil
41	Ben Rhodes (R)	ThorSport Racing	Toyota	XPO Logistics
44	Tommy Joe Martins	Martins Motorsports	Chevrolet	BootDaddy.com
49	Reed Sorenson (i)	Premium Motorsports	Chevrolet	Zyalix
50	Travis Kvapil	MAKE Motorsports	Chevrolet	Bad Boy Mowers
51	Cody Coughlin (R)	Kyle Busch Motorsports	Toyota	Jegs High Performance
63	Ryan Ellis (i)	MB Motorsports	Chevrolet	Theme Park Connection
66	Ross Chastain (i)	Bolen Motorsports	Chevrolet	Bolen Motorsports
71	Brandon Hightower (i)	Contreras Motorsports	Chevrolet	Advanced Fleet Services
75	Parker Kligerman	Henderson Motorsports	Toyota	Food Country USA
78	Chris Fontaine	Glenden Enterprises	Toyota	Glenden Enterprises
81	Ryan Truex	Hattori Racing Enterprises	Toyota	ADVICS
86	Brandon Brown	Brandonbilt Motorsports	Chevrolet	Brandonbilt Motorsports
88	Matt Crafton	ThorSport Racing	Toyota	Shasta, Menards
98	Rico Abreu (R)	ThorSport Racing	Toyota	Safelite, Curb Records
Official entry list

== Practice ==
=== First practice ===
The first practice session was held on Friday, October 21, at 12:00 pm CST, and would last for 55 minutes. Grant Enfinger, driving for GMS Racing, would set the fastest time in the session, with a lap of 51.401, and an average speed of 186.300 mph (299.821 km/h).

Pos.	#	Driver	Team	Make	Time	Speed
1	24	Grant Enfinger (R)	GMS Racing	Chevrolet	51.401	186.300
2	51	Cody Coughlin (R)	Kyle Busch Motorsports	Toyota	51.408	186.275
3	4	Christopher Bell (R)	Kyle Busch Motorsports	Toyota	51.431	186.191
Full first practice results

=== Final practice ===
The final practice session was held on Friday, October 21, at 2:00 pm CST, and would last for 55 minutes. Korbin Forrister, driving for Wauters Motorsports, would set the fastest time in the session, with a lap of 50.948, and an average speed of 187.956 mph (302.486 km/h).

Pos.	#	Driver	Team	Make	Time	Speed
1	5	Korbin Forrister	Wauters Motorsports	Toyota	50.948	187.956
2	33	Ben Kennedy	GMS Racing	Chevrolet	51.108	187.368
3	29	Tyler Reddick	Brad Keselowski Racing	Ford	51.131	187.284
Full final practice results

== Qualifying ==
Qualifying was held on Saturday, October 22, at 9:30 am CST. Since Talladega Superspeedway is at least 1.5 miles (2.4 km) in length, the qualifying system was a single car, single lap, two round system where in the first round, everyone would set a time to determine positions 13–32. Then, the fastest 12 qualifiers would move on to the second round to determine positions 1–12.

Cole Custer, driving for JR Motorsports, would score the pole for the race, with a lap of 53.672, and an average speed of 178.417 mph (287.134 km/h) in the second round.

Clay Greenfield, Jennifer Jo Cobb, Ryan Ellis, and Parker Kligerman would fail to qualify.

=== Full qualifying results ===
Pos.	#	Driver	Team	Make	Time (R1)	Speed (R1)	Time (R2)	Speed (R2)
1	00	Cole Custer (R)	JR Motorsports	Chevrolet	53.842	177.854	53.672	178.417
2	24	Grant Enfinger (R)	GMS Racing	Chevrolet	53.838	177.867	53.683	178.380
3	23	Spencer Gallagher	GMS Racing	Chevrolet	53.907	177.639	53.747	178.168
4	33	Ben Kennedy	GMS Racing	Chevrolet	53.908	177.636	53.754	178.145
5	21	Johnny Sauter	GMS Racing	Chevrolet	53.830	177.893	53.855	177.811
6	17	Timothy Peters	Red Horse Racing	Toyota	53.817	177.936	53.982	177.392
7	51	Cody Coughlin (R)	Kyle Busch Motorsports	Toyota	54.323	176.279	53.998	177.340
8	9	William Byron (R)	Kyle Busch Motorsports	Toyota	54.152	176.836	54.051	177.166
9	05	John Wes Townley	Athenian Motorsports	Chevrolet	54.283	176.409	54.082	177.064
10	5	Korbin Forrister	Wauters Motorsports	Toyota	54.202	176.672	54.147	176.852
11	8	John Hunter Nemechek	NEMCO Motorsports	Chevrolet	54.271	176.448	54.262	176.477
12	11	Matt Tifft (R)	Red Horse Racing	Toyota	54.224	176.601	54.280	176.419
Eliminated in Round 1
13	88	Matt Crafton	ThorSport Racing	Toyota	54.448	175.874	–	–
14	4	Christopher Bell (R)	Kyle Busch Motorsports	Toyota	54.469	175.806	–	–
15	2	Austin Cindric	Brad Keselowski Racing	Ford	54.509	175.677	–	–
16	29	Tyler Reddick	Brad Keselowski Racing	Ford	54.525	175.626	–	–
17	19	Daniel Hemric	Brad Keselowski Racing	Ford	54.529	175.613	–	–
18	78	Chris Fontaine	Glenden Enterprises	Toyota	54.757	174.882	–	–
19	86	Brandon Brown	Brandonbilt Motorsports	Chevrolet	54.877	174.499	–	–
20	13	Cameron Hayley	ThorSport Racing	Toyota	54.925	174.347	–	–
21	36	Bobby Gerhart (i)	Bobby Gerhart Racing	Chevrolet	54.977	174.182	–	–
22	81	Ryan Truex	Hattori Racing Enterprises	Toyota	54.983	174.163	–	–
23	22	Austin Wayne Self (R)	AM Racing	Chevrolet	55.110	173.762	–	–
24	98	Rico Abreu (R)	ThorSport Racing	Toyota	55.119	173.733	–	–
25	41	Ben Rhodes (R)	ThorSport Racing	Toyota	55.241	173.350	–	–
26	66	Ross Chastain (i)	Bolen Motorsports	Chevrolet	55.354	172.996	–	–
27	02	Dylan Lupton (i)	Young's Motorsports	Chevrolet	55.360	172.977	–	–
Qualified by owner's points
28	49	Reed Sorenson (i)	Premium Motorsports	Chevrolet	55.605	172.215	–	–
29	44	Tommy Joe Martins	Martins Motorsports	Chevrolet	55.683	171.973	–	–
30	71	Brandon Hightower (i)	Contreras Motorsports	Chevrolet	56.663	168.999	–	–
31	50	Travis Kvapil	MAKE Motorsports	Chevrolet	56.663	168.999	–	–
32	07	Cody Ware (i)	SS-Green Light Racing	Chevrolet	57.258	167.243	–	–
33	10	Clay Greenfield	Jennifer Jo Cobb Racing	Chevrolet	55.689	171.955	–	–
34	1	Jennifer Jo Cobb	Jennifer Jo Cobb Racing	Chevrolet	56.415	169.742	–	–
35	63	Ryan Ellis (i)	MB Motorsports	Chevrolet	56.443	169.658	–	–
36	75	Parker Kligerman	Henderson Motorsports	Toyota	57.146	167.571	–	–
Official qualifying results
Official starting lineup

== Race results ==
Fin	St	#	Driver	Team	Make	Laps	Led	Status	Pts
1	2	24	Grant Enfinger (R)	GMS Racing	Chevrolet	94	45	Running	37
2	3	23	Spencer Gallagher	GMS Racing	Chevrolet	94	1	Running	32
3	6	17	Timothy Peters	Red Horse Racing	Toyota	94	14	Running	31
4	24	98	Rico Abreu (R)	ThorSport Racing	Toyota	94	0	Running	29
5	4	33	Ben Kennedy	GMS Racing	Chevrolet	94	8	Running	29
6	14	4	Christopher Bell (R)	Kyle Busch Motorsports	Toyota	94	0	Running	27
7	5	21	Johnny Sauter	GMS Racing	Chevrolet	94	0	Running	26
8	22	81	Ryan Truex	Hattori Racing Enterprises	Toyota	94	0	Running	25
9	12	11	Matt Tifft (R)	Red Horse Racing	Toyota	94	3	Running	25
10	8	9	William Byron (R)	Kyle Busch Motorsports	Toyota	94	0	Running	23
11	17	19	Daniel Hemric	Brad Keselowski Racing	Ford	94	0	Running	22
12	27	02	Dylan Lupton (i)	Young's Motorsports	Chevrolet	94	0	Running	0
13	31	50	Travis Kvapil	MAKE Motorsports	Chevrolet	94	0	Running	20
14	23	22	Austin Wayne Self (R)	AM Racing	Toyota	94	1	Running	20
15	26	66	Ross Chastain (i)	Bolen Motorsports	Chevrolet	94	0	Running	0
16	29	44	Tommy Joe Martins	Martins Motorsports	Chevrolet	94	4	Running	18
17	21	36	Bobby Gerhart (i)	Bobby Gerhart Racing	Chevrolet	94	0	Running	0
18	28	49	Reed Sorenson (i)	Premium Motorsports	Chevrolet	94	0	Running	0
19	20	13	Cameron Hayley	ThorSport Racing	Toyota	93	0	Accident	14
20	15	2	Austin Cindric	Brad Keselowski Racing	Ford	92	0	Running	13
21	32	07	Cody Ware (i)	SS-Green Light Racing	Chevrolet	90	0	Running	0
22	13	88	Matt Crafton	ThorSport Racing	Toyota	88	0	Engine	11
23	18	78	Chris Fontaine	Glenden Enterprises	Toyota	64	0	Accident	10
24	25	41	Ben Rhodes (R)	ThorSport Racing	Toyota	59	0	Accident	9
25	19	86	Brandon Brown	Brandonbilt Motorsports	Chevrolet	59	0	Accident	8
26	16	29	Tyler Reddick	Brad Keselowski Racing	Ford	59	16	Accident	8
27	10	5	Korbin Forrister	Wauters Motorsports	Toyota	59	0	Accident	6
28	9	05	John Wes Townley	Athenian Motorsports	Chevrolet	59	0	Accident	5
29	1	00	Cole Custer (R)	JR Motorsports	Chevrolet	58	2	Accident	5
30	30	71	Brandon Hightower (i)	Contreras Motorsports	Chevrolet	51	0	Accident	0
31	7	51	Cody Coughlin (R)	Kyle Busch Motorsports	Toyota	34	0	Driveshaft	2
32	11	8	John Hunter Nemechek	NEMCO Motorsports	Chevrolet	13	0	Engine	1
Official race results

== Standings after the race ==
Drivers' Championship standings

	Pos	Driver	Points
	1	William Byron	2,103
	2	Christopher Bell	2,089 (−14)
2	3	Timothy Peters	2,084 (−19)
	4	Ben Kennedy	2,084 (−19)
1	5	Johnny Sauter	2,078 (−25)
3	6	Matt Crafton	2,072 (−31)
	7	Daniel Hemric	2,059 (−44)
	8	John Hunter Nemechek	2,038 (−65)
Official driver's standings

- Note: Only the first 8 positions are included for the driver standings.

Previous race: 2016 DC Solar 350	NASCAR Camping World Truck Series; 2016 season	Next race: 2016 Texas Roadhouse 200
