= 2017 Service King 300 =

Fifth race of the 2017 NASCAR Xfinity Series

Race details
- Race 5 of 33 in the 2017 NASCAR Xfinity Series
- Date: March 25, 2017
- Official name: 19th Annual Service King 300
- Location: Fontana, California, Auto Club Speedway
- Course: Permanent racing facility
- Course length: 2 miles (3.2 km)
- Distance: 150 laps, 300 mi (482.803 km)
- Scheduled distance: 150 laps, 300 mi (482.803 km)
- Average speed: 116.883 miles per hour (188.105 km/h)

Pole position
Driver	Joey Logano	Team Penske
- Time: 39.440

Most laps led
Driver	Joey Logano	Team Penske
- Laps: 70

Winner
No. 42	Kyle Larson	Chip Ganassi Racing

Television in the United States
- Network: Fox Sports 1
- Announcers: Adam Alexander, Michael Waltrip, Brad Keselowski

Radio in the United States
- Radio: Motor Racing Network

The 2017 Service King 300 was the fifth stock car race of the 2017 NASCAR Xfinity Series season and the 19th iteration of the event. The race was held on Saturday, March 25, 2017, in Fontana, California, at Auto Club Speedway, a 2 miles (3.2 km) permanent D-shaped oval racetrack. The race took the scheduled 150 laps to complete. At race's end, Kyle Larson, driving for Chip Ganassi Racing, would defend against eventual second-place finisher, Team Penske driver Joey Logano, on the final restart with four to go to win his sixth career NASCAR Xfinity Series win and his first of the season. To fill out the podium, Kyle Busch of Joe Gibbs Racing finished third.

== Entry list ==
- (R) denotes rookie driver.
- (i) denotes driver who is ineligible for series driver points.

#	Driver	Team	Make
00	Cole Custer (R)	Stewart–Haas Racing	Ford
0	Garrett Smithley	JD Motorsports	Chevrolet
1	Elliott Sadler	JR Motorsports	Chevrolet
01	Harrison Rhodes	JD Motorsports	Chevrolet
2	Paul Menard (i)	Richard Childress Racing	Chevrolet
3	Ty Dillon (i)	Richard Childress Racing	Chevrolet
4	Ross Chastain	JD Motorsports	Chevrolet
5	Michael Annett	JR Motorsports	Chevrolet
6	Bubba Wallace	Roush Fenway Racing	Ford
7	Justin Allgaier	JR Motorsports	Chevrolet
07	Ray Black Jr.	SS-Green Light Racing	Chevrolet
8	Jeff Green	B. J. McLeod Motorsports	Chevrolet
9	William Byron (R)	JR Motorsports	Chevrolet
11	Blake Koch	Kaulig Racing	Chevrolet
13	Timmy Hill	MBM Motorsports	Chevrolet
14	J. J. Yeley	TriStar Motorsports	Toyota
16	Ryan Reed	Roush Fenway Racing	Ford
18	Kyle Busch (i)	Joe Gibbs Racing	Toyota
19	Matt Tifft (R)	Joe Gibbs Racing	Toyota
20	Erik Jones (i)	Joe Gibbs Racing	Toyota
21	Daniel Hemric (R)	Richard Childress Racing	Chevrolet
22	Joey Logano (i)	Team Penske	Ford
23	Spencer Gallagher (R)	GMS Racing	Chevrolet
24	Corey LaJoie (i)	JGL Racing	Toyota
28	Dakoda Armstrong	JGL Racing	Toyota
33	Brandon Jones	Richard Childress Racing	Chevrolet
39	Ryan Sieg	RSS Racing	Chevrolet
40	Brandon Hightower	MBM Motorsports	Dodge
42	Kyle Larson (i)	Chip Ganassi Racing	Chevrolet
48	Brennan Poole	Chip Ganassi Racing	Chevrolet
51	Jeremy Clements	Jeremy Clements Racing	Chevrolet
52	Joey Gase	Jimmy Means Racing	Chevrolet
62	Brendan Gaughan	Richard Childress Racing	Chevrolet
72	John Jackson*	MBM Motorsports	Chevrolet
74	Mike Harmon	Mike Harmon Racing	Dodge
77	Josh Bilicki**	Obaika Racing	Chevrolet
78	B. J. McLeod	B. J. McLeod Motorsports	Chevrolet
90	Martin Roy	King Autosport	Chevrolet
93	Jordan Anderson (i)	RSS Racing	Chevrolet
97	Stephen Leicht	Obaika Racing	Chevrolet
98	Casey Mears	Biagi–DenBeste Racing	Ford
99	David Starr	B. J. McLeod Motorsports with SS-Green Light Racing	Chevrolet
Official entry list

*Withdrew.

**Withdrew after Bilicki refused rides with the team, after multiple incidents with the team. Leicht would then proceed to drive the #97, renumbering the #77.

== Practice ==
=== First practice ===
The first practice session was held on Friday, March 24, at 12:00 PM PST and lasted for 55 minutes. Joey Logano of Team Penske set the fastest time in the session with a lap of 40.245 and an average speed of 178.904 miles per hour (287.918 km/h).

Pos.	#	Driver	Team	Make	Time	Speed
1	22	Joey Logano (i)	Team Penske	Ford	40.245	178.904
2	42	Kyle Larson (i)	Chip Ganassi Racing	Chevrolet	40.599	177.344
3	20	Erik Jones (i)	Joe Gibbs Racing	Toyota	40.664	177.061
Full first practice results

=== Final practice ===
The final practice session was held on Friday, March 24, at 2:00 PM PST and lasted for 55 minutes. Joey Logano of Team Penske set the fastest time in the session, with a lap of 40.723 and an average speed of 176.804 miles per hour (284.538 km/h).

Pos.	#	Driver	Team	Make	Time	Speed
1	22	Joey Logano (i)	Team Penske	Ford	40.723	176.804
2	20	Erik Jones (i)	Joe Gibbs Racing	Toyota	40.737	176.744
3	2	Paul Menard (i)	Richard Childress Racing	Chevrolet	40.773	176.587
Full final practice results

== Qualifying ==
Qualifying took place on Saturday, March 23, at 9:30 AM PST. Since Auto Club Speedway is at least 2 miles (3.2 km) in length, the qualifying system was a single car, single lap, two round system where in the first round, everyone would set a time to determine positions 13–40. Then, the fastest 12 qualifiers would move on to the second round to determine positions 1–12.

Joey Logano of Team Penske would advance from the first round and win the pole by setting the fastest time in Round 2, with a lap of 39.440 and an average speed of 182.556 miles per hour (293.795 km/h).

No drivers would fail to qualify.

=== Full qualifying results ===
Pos.	#	Driver	Team	Make	Time (R1)	Speed (R1)	Time (R2)	Speed (R2)
1	22	Joey Logano (i)	Team Penske	Ford	39.711	181.310	39.440	182.556
2	21	Daniel Hemric (R)	Richard Childress Racing	Chevrolet	39.529	182.145	39.635	181.658
3	20	Erik Jones (i)	Joe Gibbs Racing	Toyota	39.751	181.128	39.676	181.470
4	00	Cole Custer (R)	Stewart–Haas Racing	Ford	39.750	181.132	39.789	180.955
5	2	Paul Menard (i)	Richard Childress Racing	Chevrolet	39.828	180.777	39.872	180.578
6	9	William Byron (R)	JR Motorsports	Chevrolet	39.812	180.850	39.900	180.451
7	42	Kyle Larson (i)	Chip Ganassi Racing	Chevrolet	39.721	181.264	39.912	180.397
8	33	Brandon Jones	Richard Childress Racing	Chevrolet	40.089	179.600	40.004	179.982
9	3	Ty Dillon (i)	Richard Childress Racing	Chevrolet	39.944	180.252	40.034	179.847
10	6	Bubba Wallace	Roush Fenway Racing	Ford	40.029	179.870	40.063	179.717
11	11	Blake Koch	Kaulig Racing	Chevrolet	40.081	179.636	40.123	179.448
12	62	Brendan Gaughan	Richard Childress Racing	Chevrolet	40.088	179.605	40.330	178.527
Eliminated in Round 1
13	48	Brennan Poole	Chip Ganassi Racing	Chevrolet	40.101	179.547	—	—
14	1	Elliott Sadler	JR Motorsports	Chevrolet	40.109	179.511	—	—
15	16	Ryan Reed	Roush Fenway Racing	Ford	40.225	178.993	—	—
16	18	Kyle Busch (i)	Joe Gibbs Racing	Toyota	40.294	178.687	—	—
17	5	Michael Annett	JR Motorsports	Chevrolet	40.308	178.625	—	—
18	23	Spencer Gallagher (R)	GMS Racing	Chevrolet	40.314	178.598	—	—
19	98	Casey Mears	Biagi–DenBeste Racing	Ford	40.375	178.328	—	—
20	7	Justin Allgaier	JR Motorsports	Chevrolet	40.384	178.288	—	—
21	28	Dakoda Armstrong	JGL Racing	Toyota	40.393	178.249	—	—
22	19	Matt Tifft (R)	Joe Gibbs Racing	Toyota	40.412	178.165	—	—
23	14	J. J. Yeley	TriStar Motorsports	Toyota	40.530	177.646	—	—
24	4	Ross Chastain	JD Motorsports	Chevrolet	40.548	177.567	—	—
25	39	Ryan Sieg	RSS Racing	Chevrolet	40.654	177.104	—	—
26	24	Corey LaJoie (i)	JGL Racing	Toyota	40.725	176.796	—	—
27	78	B. J. McLeod	B. J. McLeod Motorsports	Chevrolet	40.763	176.631	—	—
28	51	Jeremy Clements	Jeremy Clements Racing	Chevrolet	41.163	174.914	—	—
29	01	Harrison Rhodes	JD Motorsports	Chevrolet	41.333	174.195	—	—
30	0	Garrett Smithley	JD Motorsports	Chevrolet	41.340	174.165	—	—
31	07	Ray Black Jr.	SS-Green Light Racing	Chevrolet	41.413	173.858	—	—
32	8	Jeff Green	B. J. McLeod Motorsports	Chevrolet	41.925	171.735	—	—
33	99	David Starr	BJMM with SS-Green Light Racing	Chevrolet	42.365	169.952	—	—
Qualified by owner's points
34	90	Martin Roy	King Autosport	Chevrolet	42.446	169.627	—	—
35	93	Jordan Anderson (i)	RSS Racing	Chevrolet	42.908	167.801	—	—
36	13	Timmy Hill	MBM Motorsports	Chevrolet	42.918	167.762	—	—
37	52	Joey Gase	Jimmy Means Racing	Chevrolet	43.004	167.426	—	—
38	97	Stephen Leicht	Obaika Racing	Chevrolet	43.714	164.707	—	—
39	40	Brandon Hightower	MBM Motorsports	Dodge	44.342	162.374	—	—
40	74	Mike Harmon	Mike Harmon Racing	Dodge	45.811	157.167	—	—
Withdrew
WD	72	John Jackson	MBM Motorsports	Chevrolet	—	—	—	—
WD	97	Josh Bilicki	Obaika Racing	Chevrolet	—	—	—	—
Official qualifying results
Official starting lineup

== Race results ==
Stage 1 Laps: 35

Pos.	#	Driver	Team	Make	Pts
1	18	Kyle Busch (i)	Joe Gibbs Racing	Toyota	0
2	1	Elliott Sadler	JR Motorsports	Chevrolet	9
3	42	Kyle Larson (i)	Chip Ganassi Racing	Chevrolet	0
4	20	Erik Jones (i)	Joe Gibbs Racing	Toyota	0
5	9	William Byron (R)	JR Motorsports	Chevrolet	6
6	3	Ty Dillon (i)	Richard Childress Racing	Chevrolet	0
7	48	Brennan Poole	Chip Ganassi Racing	Chevrolet	4
8	00	Cole Custer (R)	Stewart–Haas Racing	Ford	3
9	2	Paul Menard (i)	Richard Childress Racing	Chevrolet	0
10	21	Daniel Hemric (R)	Richard Childress Racing	Chevrolet	1

Stage 2 Laps: 35

Pos.	#	Driver	Team	Make	Pts
1	18	Kyle Busch (i)	Joe Gibbs Racing	Toyota	0
2	22	Joey Logano (i)	Team Penske	Ford	0
3	20	Erik Jones (i)	Joe Gibbs Racing	Toyota	0
4	42	Kyle Larson (i)	Chip Ganassi Racing	Chevrolet	0
5	1	Elliott Sadler	JR Motorsports	Chevrolet	6
6	3	Ty Dillon (i)	Richard Childress Racing	Chevrolet	0
7	2	Paul Menard (i)	Richard Childress Racing	Chevrolet	0
8	00	Cole Custer (R)	Stewart–Haas Racing	Ford	3
9	48	Brennan Poole	Chip Ganassi Racing	Chevrolet	2
10	9	William Byron (R)	JR Motorsports	Chevrolet	1

Stage 3 Laps: 80

Pos	#	Driver	Team	Make	Laps	Led	Status	Pts
1	42	Kyle Larson (i)	Chip Ganassi Racing	Chevrolet	150	21	running	0
2	22	Joey Logano (i)	Team Penske	Ford	150	70	running	0
3	18	Kyle Busch (i)	Joe Gibbs Racing	Toyota	150	55	running	0
4	20	Erik Jones (i)	Joe Gibbs Racing	Toyota	150	0	running	0
5	9	William Byron (R)	JR Motorsports	Chevrolet	150	1	running	39
6	6	Bubba Wallace	Roush Fenway Racing	Ford	150	0	running	31
7	1	Elliott Sadler	JR Motorsports	Chevrolet	150	0	running	45
8	48	Brennan Poole	Chip Ganassi Racing	Chevrolet	150	0	running	35
9	7	Justin Allgaier	JR Motorsports	Chevrolet	150	0	running	28
10	3	Ty Dillon (i)	Richard Childress Racing	Chevrolet	150	0	running	0
11	21	Daniel Hemric (R)	Richard Childress Racing	Chevrolet	150	0	running	27
12	11	Blake Koch	Kaulig Racing	Chevrolet	150	0	running	25
13	5	Michael Annett	JR Motorsports	Chevrolet	150	0	running	24
14	98	Casey Mears	Biagi–DenBeste Racing	Ford	150	0	running	23
15	16	Ryan Reed	Roush Fenway Racing	Ford	150	0	running	22
16	14	J. J. Yeley	TriStar Motorsports	Toyota	150	0	running	21
17	19	Matt Tifft (R)	Joe Gibbs Racing	Toyota	150	0	running	20
18	24	Corey LaJoie (i)	JGL Racing	Toyota	150	0	running	0
19	23	Spencer Gallagher (R)	GMS Racing	Chevrolet	150	0	running	18
20	28	Dakoda Armstrong	JGL Racing	Toyota	150	0	running	17
21	39	Ryan Sieg	RSS Racing	Chevrolet	150	0	running	16
22	51	Jeremy Clements	Jeremy Clements Racing	Chevrolet	150	2	running	15
23	78	B. J. McLeod	B. J. McLeod Motorsports	Chevrolet	150	0	running	14
24	99	David Starr	BJMM with SS-Green Light Racing	Chevrolet	150	0	running	13
25	90	Martin Roy	King Autosport	Chevrolet	150	0	running	12
26	0	Garrett Smithley	JD Motorsports	Chevrolet	150	0	running	11
27	07	Ray Black Jr.	SS-Green Light Racing	Chevrolet	150	1	running	10
28	52	Joey Gase	Jimmy Means Racing	Chevrolet	150	0	running	9
29	8	Jeff Green	B. J. McLeod Motorsports	Chevrolet	150	0	running	8
30	13	Timmy Hill	MBM Motorsports	Chevrolet	150	0	running	7
31	01	Harrison Rhodes	JD Motorsports	Chevrolet	150	0	running	6
32	33	Brandon Jones	Richard Childress Racing	Chevrolet	149	0	running	5
33	62	Brendan Gaughan	Richard Childress Racing	Chevrolet	148	0	running	4
34	74	Mike Harmon	Mike Harmon Racing	Dodge	146	0	running	3
35	00	Cole Custer (R)	Stewart–Haas Racing	Ford	106	0	crash	8
36	2	Paul Menard (i)	Richard Childress Racing	Chevrolet	94	0	crash	0
37	4	Ross Chastain	JD Motorsports	Chevrolet	81	0	crash	1
38	40	Brandon Hightower	MBM Motorsports	Dodge	72	0	transmission	1
39	97	Stephen Leicht	Obaika Racing	Chevrolet	12	0	vibration	1
40	93	Jordan Anderson (i)	RSS Racing	Chevrolet	3	0	electrical	0
Official race results

== Standings after the race ==
Drivers' Championship standings

Pos	Driver	Points
1	Elliott Sadler	189
2	William Byron	172 (–17)
3	Justin Allgaier	143 (–46)
4	Ryan Reed	143 (–46)
5	Bubba Wallace	140 (–49)
6	Brennan Poole	133 (–56)
7	Daniel Hemric	131 (–58)
8	Michael Annett	113 (–76)
9	Matt Tifft	111 (–78)
10	Blake Koch	106 (–83)
11	Dakoda Armstrong	101 (–88)
12	Cole Custer	86 (–103)
Official driver's standings

- Note: Only the first 12 positions are included for the driver standings.

Previous race: 2017 DC Solar 200	NASCAR Xfinity Series; 2017 season	Next race: 2017 My Bariatric Solutions 300
