= 2016 American Ethanol E15 225 =

16th race of the 2016 NASCAR Camping World Truck Series

Race details
- Race 16 of 23 of the 2016 NASCAR Camping World Truck Series
- Date: September 16, 2016
- Official name: 8th Annual American Ethanol E15 225
- Location: Chicagoland Speedway, Joliet, Illinois
- Course: Permanent racing facility
- Course length: 1.5 miles (2.4 km)
- Distance: 151 laps, 226 mi (364 km)
- Scheduled distance: 150 laps, 225 mi (362 km)
- Average speed: 108.648 mph (174.852 km/h)

Pole position
Driver	Spencer Gallagher	GMS Racing
- Time: 30.656

Most laps led
Driver	Kyle Busch	Kyle Busch Motorsports
- Laps: 95

Winner
No. 18	Kyle Busch	Kyle Busch Motorsports

Television in the United States
- Network: FS1
- Announcers: Vince Welch, Phil Parsons, and Michael Waltrip

Radio in the United States
- Radio: MRN

The 2016 American Ethanol E15 225 was the 16th stock car race of the 2016 NASCAR Camping World Truck Series, the final race of the regular season, and the 8th iteration of the event. The race was held on Friday, September 16, 2016, in Joilet, Illinois, at Chicagoland Speedway, a 1.5-mile (2.4 km) permanent tri-oval shaped racetrack. The race was increased from 150 laps to 151 laps, due to a NASCAR overtime finish. Kyle Busch, driving for his own team, Kyle Busch Motorsports, held off Daniel Hemric and Cameron Hayley in the final 2 laps, and earned his 46th career NASCAR Camping World Truck Series win, along with his second of the season. Busch dominated the majority of the race, leading 95 laps.

The eight drivers to qualify for the inaugural Truck Series playoffs are William Byron, Matt Crafton, John Hunter Nemechek, Christopher Bell, Johnny Sauter, Ben Kennedy, Daniel Hemric, and Timothy Peters.

== Background ==
The layout of Chicagoland Speedway, the venue where the race was held.

Chicagoland Speedway is a 1.5 miles (2.4 km) tri-oval speedway in Joliet, Illinois, southwest of Chicago. The speedway opened in 2001 and actively hosted NASCAR racing including the NASCAR Cup Series until 2019. Until 2010, the speedway has also hosted the IndyCar Series, recording numerous close finishes including the closest finish in IndyCar history. The speedway is currently owned and operated by Nascar.

=== Entry list ===
- (R) denotes rookie driver.
- (i) denotes driver who is ineligible for series driver points.

#	Driver	Team	Make	Sponsor
00	Cole Custer (R)	JR Motorsports	Chevrolet	Haas Automation
1	Jennifer Jo Cobb	Jennifer Jo Cobb Racing	Chevrolet	PitStopsforHope.org
02	Tyler Young	Young's Motorsports	Chevrolet	Randco, Young's Building Systems
4	Christopher Bell (R)	Kyle Busch Motorsports	Toyota	JBL
05	John Wes Townley	Athenian Motorsports	Chevrolet	Jive Communications, Zaxby's
6	Norm Benning	Norm Benning Racing	Chevrolet	Norm Benning Racing
07	Ray Black Jr. (i)	SS-Green Light Racing	Chevrolet	RTFT All Star Racing League
8	John Hunter Nemechek	NEMCO Motorsports	Chevrolet	#TeamTurtle, #TeamFoot
9	William Byron (R)	Kyle Busch Motorsports	Toyota	Liberty University
10	Caleb Roark	Jennifer Jo Cobb Racing	Chevrolet	Driven2Honor.org
11	Matt Tifft (R)	Red Horse Racing	Toyota	Brain Gear, Surface Sunscreen
13	Cameron Hayley	ThorSport Racing	Toyota	Ride TV, Cabinets by Hayley
17	Timothy Peters	Red Horse Racing	Toyota	Red Horse Racing
18	Kyle Busch (i)	Kyle Busch Motorsports	Toyota	SiriusXM
19	Daniel Hemric	Brad Keselowski Racing	Ford	DrawTite
21	Johnny Sauter	GMS Racing	Chevrolet	Alamo Rent a Car
22	Austin Wayne Self (R)	AM Racing	Toyota	AM Technical Solutions
23	Spencer Gallagher	GMS Racing	Chevrolet	Chapel of the Flowers
24	Grant Enfinger (R)	GMS Racing	Chevrolet	Champion Power Equipment
29	Tyler Reddick	Brad Keselowski Racing	Ford	Cooper-Standard Automotive
33	Ben Kennedy	GMS Racing	Chevrolet	Weber Inc.
41	Ben Rhodes (R)	ThorSport Racing	Toyota	Alpha Energy Solutions
44	Tommy Joe Martins	Martins Motorsports	Chevrolet	Cross Concrete Construction
49	Reed Sorenson (i)	Premium Motorsports	Chevrolet	Premium Motorsports
50	Travis Kvapil	MAKE Motorsports	Chevrolet	Team Brackeen
51	Daniel Suárez (i)	Kyle Busch Motorsports	Toyota	Arris
63	Jesse Little	MB Motorsports	Chevrolet	Mittler Bros. Machine & Tool
66	Jordan Anderson	Bolen Motorsports	Chevrolet	Columbia SC - Famously Hot
71	Josh Berry (i)	Contreras Motorsports	Chevrolet	American Club, RaceTrac
81	Ryan Truex	Hattori Racing Enterprises	Toyota	Toyoda Gosei Scorpions
88	Matt Crafton	ThorSport Racing	Toyota	Fisher Nuts, Menards
98	Rico Abreu (R)	ThorSport Racing	Toyota	Safelite, Curb Records
Official entry list

== Practice ==
=== First practice ===
The first practice session was held on Thursday, September 15, at 3:00 pm CST, and would last for 55 minutes. John Wes Townley, driving for his family team, Athenian Motorsports, would set the fastest time in the session, with a lap of 30.825, and an average speed of 175.182 mph (281.928 km/h).

Pos.	#	Driver	Team	Make	Time	Speed
1	05	John Wes Townley	Athenian Motorsports	Chevrolet	30.825	175.182
2	9	William Byron (R)	Kyle Busch Motorsports	Toyota	30.873	174.910
3	88	Matt Crafton	ThorSport Racing	Toyota	31.074	173.779
Full first practice results

=== Final practice ===
The final practice session was held on Thursday, September 15, at 5:30 pm CST, and would last for 55 minutes. Daniel Hemric, driving for Brad Keselowski Racing, would set the fastest time in the session, with a lap of 30.584, and an average speed of 176.563 mph (284.151 km/h).

Pos.	#	Driver	Team	Make	Time	Speed
1	19	Daniel Hemric	Brad Keselowski Racing	Ford	30.584	176.563
2	23	Spencer Gallagher	GMS Racing	Chevrolet	30.601	176.465
3	51	Daniel Suárez (i)	Kyle Busch Motorsports	Toyota	30.603	176.453
Full final practice results

== Qualifying ==
Qualifying was held on Friday, September 16, at 3:45 pm CST. Since Chicagoland Speedway is at least 1.5 miles (2.4 km) in length, the qualifying system was a single car, single lap, two round system where in the first round, everyone would set a time to determine positions 13–32. Then, the fastest 12 qualifiers would move on to the second round to determine positions 1–12.

Spencer Gallagher, driving for GMS Racing, would score the pole for the race, with a lap of 30.656, and an average speed of 176.148 mph (283.483 km/h) in the second round.

=== Full qualifying results ===
Pos.	#	Driver	Team	Make	Time (R1)	Speed (R1)	Time (R2)	Speed (R2)
1	23	Spencer Gallagher	GMS Racing	Chevrolet	30.835	175.126	30.656	176.148
2	05	John Wes Townley	Athenian Motorsports	Chevrolet	30.858	174.995	30.700	175.896
3	51	Daniel Suárez (i)	Kyle Busch Motorsports	Toyota	30.849	175.046	30.732	175.713
4	29	Tyler Reddick	Brad Keselowski Racing	Ford	30.863	174.967	30.764	175.530
5	17	Timothy Peters	Red Horse Racing	Toyota	30.791	175.376	30.767	175.513
6	33	Ben Kennedy	GMS Racing	Chevrolet	30.896	174.780	30.775	175.467
7	41	Ben Rhodes (R)	ThorSport Racing	Toyota	30.891	174.808	30.794	175.359
8	18	Kyle Busch (i)	Kyle Busch Motorsports	Toyota	30.884	174.848	30.799	175.330
9	9	William Byron (R)	Kyle Busch Motorsports	Toyota	30.903	174.740	30.829	175.160
10	19	Daniel Hemric	Brad Keselowski Racing	Ford	30.980	174.306	30.860	174.984
11	11	Matt Tifft (R)	Red Horse Racing	Toyota	30.993	174.233	30.860	174.984
12	4	Christopher Bell (R)	Kyle Busch Motorsports	Toyota	30.960	174.419	30.903	174.740
Eliminated in Round 1
13	88	Matt Crafton	ThorSport Racing	Toyota	30.996	174.216	–	–
14	24	Grant Enfinger (R)	GMS Racing	Chevrolet	31.016	174.104	–	–
15	98	Rico Abreu (R)	ThorSport Racing	Toyota	31.095	173.661	–	–
16	21	Johnny Sauter	GMS Racing	Chevrolet	31.100	173.633	–	–
17	00	Cole Custer (R)	JR Motorsports	Chevrolet	31.107	173.594	–	–
18	8	John Hunter Nemechek	NEMCO Motorsports	Chevrolet	31.157	173.316	–	–
19	02	Tyler Young	Young's Motorsports	Chevrolet	31.160	173.299	–	–
20	13	Cameron Hayley	ThorSport Racing	Toyota	31.216	172.988	–	–
21	81	Ryan Truex	Hattori Racing Enterprises	Toyota	31.296	172.546	–	–
22	71	Josh Berry (i)	Contreras Motorsports	Chevrolet	31.548	171.168	–	–
23	66	Jordan Anderson	Bolen Motorsports	Chevrolet	31.572	171.038	–	–
24	44	Tommy Joe Martins	Martins Motorsports	Chevrolet	31.720	170.240	–	–
25	07	Ray Black Jr. (i)	SS-Green Light Racing	Chevrolet	31.773	169.956	–	–
26	22	Austin Wayne Self (R)	AM Racing	Toyota	31.892	169.321	–	–
27	1	Jennifer Jo Cobb	Jennifer Jo Cobb Racing	Chevrolet	32.032	168.581	–	–
Qualified by owner's points
28	63	Jesse Little	MB Motorsports	Chevrolet	32.271	167.333	–	–
29	49	Reed Sorenson (i)	Premium Motorsports	Chevrolet	32.286	167.255	–	–
30	50	Travis Kvapil	MAKE Motorsports	Chevrolet	32.578	165.756	–	–
31	10	Caleb Roark	Jennifer Jo Cobb Racing	Chevrolet	34.511	156.472	–	–
32	6	Norm Benning	Norm Benning Racing	Chevrolet	35.396	152.560	–	–
Official qualifying results
Official starting lineup

== Race results ==
Fin	St	#	Driver	Team	Make	Laps	Led	Status	Pts
1	8	18	Kyle Busch (i)	Kyle Busch Motorsports	Toyota	151	95	Running	0
2	10	19	Daniel Hemric	Brad Keselowski Racing	Ford	151	0	Running	31
3	20	13	Cameron Hayley	ThorSport Racing	Toyota	151	0	Running	30
4	12	4	Christopher Bell (R)	Kyle Busch Motorsports	Toyota	151	0	Running	29
5	16	21	Johnny Sauter	GMS Racing	Chevrolet	151	0	Running	28
6	14	24	Grant Enfinger (R)	GMS Racing	Chevrolet	151	0	Running	27
7	1	23	Spencer Gallagher	GMS Racing	Chevrolet	151	8	Running	27
8	5	17	Timothy Peters	Red Horse Racing	Toyota	151	0	Running	25
9	17	00	Cole Custer (R)	JR Motorsports	Chevrolet	151	0	Running	24
10	4	29	Tyler Reddick	Brad Keselowski Racing	Ford	151	0	Running	23
11	3	51	Daniel Suárez (i)	Kyle Busch Motorsports	Toyota	151	43	Running	0
12	11	11	Matt Tifft (R)	Red Horse Racing	Toyota	151	0	Running	21
13	22	71	Josh Berry (i)	Contreras Motorsports	Chevrolet	151	0	Running	0
14	18	8	John Hunter Nemechek	NEMCO Motorsports	Chevrolet	151	0	Running	19
15	21	81	Ryan Truex	Hattori Racing Enterprises	Toyota	151	0	Running	18
16	19	02	Tyler Young	Young's Motorsports	Chevrolet	151	0	Running	17
17	26	22	Austin Wayne Self (R)	AM Racing	Toyota	151	0	Running	16
18	25	07	Ray Black Jr. (i)	SS-Green Light Racing	Chevrolet	151	0	Running	0
19	15	98	Rico Abreu (R)	ThorSport Racing	Toyota	150	0	Running	14
20	2	05	John Wes Townley	Athenian Motorsports	Chevrolet	149	0	Running	13
21	30	50	Travis Kvapil	MAKE Motorsports	Chevrolet	147	0	Engine	12
22	27	1	Jennifer Jo Cobb	Jennifer Jo Cobb Racing	Chevrolet	147	0	Running	11
23	23	66	Jordan Anderson	Bolen Motorsports	Chevrolet	138	0	Engine	10
24	24	44	Tommy Joe Martins	Martins Motorsports	Chevrolet	137	1	Accident	10
25	7	41	Ben Rhodes (R)	ThorSport Racing	Toyota	125	0	Accident	8
26	6	33	Ben Kennedy	GMS Racing	Chevrolet	111	4	Accident	8
27	13	88	Matt Crafton	ThorSport Racing	Toyota	111	0	Accident	6
28	29	49	Reed Sorenson (i)	Premium Motorsports	Chevrolet	91	0	Clutch	0
29	28	63	Jesse Little	MB Motorsports	Chevrolet	79	0	Engine	4
30	9	9	William Byron (R)	Kyle Busch Motorsports	Toyota	40	0	Accident	3
31	32	6	Norm Benning	Norm Benning Racing	Chevrolet	14	0	Suspension	2
32	31	10	Caleb Roark	Jennifer Jo Cobb Racing	Chevrolet	11	0	Electrical	1
Official race results

== Standings after the race ==
Drivers' Championship standings

	Pos	Driver	Points
	1	William Byron	2,015
2	2	Matt Crafton	2,006 (−9)
5	3	John Hunter Nemechek	2,006 (−9)
3	4	Christopher Bell	2,003 (−12)
2	5	Johnny Sauter	2,003 (−12)
	6	Ben Kennedy	2,003 (−12)
5	7	Daniel Hemric	2,000 (−15)
3	8	Timothy Peters	2,000 (−15)
Official driver's standings

- Note: Only the first 8 positions are included for the driver standings.

Previous race: 2016 Chevrolet Silverado 250	NASCAR Camping World Truck Series; 2016 season	Next race: 2016 UNOH 175
