= 2016 Great Clips 200 =

2nd race of the 2016 NASCAR Camping World Truck Series

Race details
- Race 2 of 23 of the 2016 NASCAR Camping World Truck Series
- Date: February 27, 2016
- Official name: 8th Annual Great Clips 200
- Location: Atlanta Motor Speedway, Hampton, Georgia
- Course: Permanent racing facility
- Course length: 1.54 miles (2.48 km)
- Distance: 130 laps, 200.2 mi (322.19 km)
- Scheduled distance: 130 laps, 200.2 mi (322.19 km)
- Average speed: 121.150 miles per hour (194.972 km/h)

Pole position
Driver	Matt Crafton	ThorSport Racing
- Time: 30.836

Most laps led
Driver	Matt Crafton	ThorSport Racing
- Laps: 76

Winner
No. 8	John Hunter Nemechek	NEMCO Motorsports

Television in the United States
- Network: FS1
- Announcers: Vince Welch, Phil Parsons, Michael Waltrip

Radio in the United States
- Radio: MRN

The 2016 Great Clips 200 was the 2nd stock car race of the 2016 NASCAR Camping World Truck Series, and the 8th iteration of the event. The race was held on Saturday, February 27, 2016, in Hampton, Georgia at Atlanta Motor Speedway, a 1.54 mile (2.48 km) permanent tri-oval shaped speedway. The race took the scheduled 130 laps to complete. At race's end, John Hunter Nemechek, driving for his family team, NEMCO Motorsports, held off Camden Hayley in the final 2 laps, and earned his second career NASCAR Camping World Truck Series win, along with his first of the season. To fill out the podium, Timothy Peters, driving for Red Horse Racing, would finish in 3rd, respectively.

== Background ==
The layout of Atlanta Motor Speedway, the venue where the race was held.

The race was held at Atlanta Motor Speedway, a 1.54-mile entertainment facility in Hampton, Georgia, United States, 20 miles (32 km) south of Atlanta. It has annually hosted NASCAR Cup Series stock car races since its inauguration in 1960.

The venue was bought by Speedway Motorsports in 1990. In 1994, 46 condominiums were built over the northeastern side of the track. In 1997, to standardize the track with Speedway Motorsports' other two intermediate ovals, the entire track was almost completely rebuilt. The frontstretch and backstretch were swapped, and the configuration of the track was changed from oval to quad-oval, with a new official length of 1.54-mile (2.48 km) where before it was 1.522-mile (2.449 km). The project made the track one of the fastest on the NASCAR circuit.

=== Entry list ===
- (R) denotes rookie driver.
- (i) denotes driver who is ineligible for series driver points.

#	Driver	Team	Make	Sponsor
00	Cole Custer (R)	JR Motorsports	Chevrolet	Haas Automation
1	Travis Kvapil	MAKE Motorsports	Chevrolet	CorvetteParts.net
02	Tyler Young	Young's Motorsports	Chevrolet	RANDCO, Young's Building Systems
4	Christopher Bell (R)	Kyle Busch Motorsports	Toyota	JBL
05	John Wes Townley	Athenian Motorsports	Chevrolet	ESPFanClub.org
6	Norm Benning	Norm Benning Racing	Chevrolet	Norm Benning Racing
07	J. J. Yeley (i)	SS-Green Light Racing	Chevrolet	Engine Parts Plus
8	John Hunter Nemechek	NEMCO Motorsports	Chevrolet	NEMCO Motorsports
9	William Byron (R)	Kyle Busch Motorsports	Toyota	Liberty University
10	Jennifer Jo Cobb	Jennifer Jo Cobb Racing	Chevrolet	Westside Vapor
11	Ben Kennedy	Red Horse Racing	Toyota	Jacob Companies
13	Cameron Hayley	ThorSport Racing	Toyota	Cabinets by Hayley
17	Timothy Peters	Red Horse Racing	Toyota	Red Horse Racing
19	Daniel Hemric	Brad Keselowski Racing	Ford	California Clean Power
20	Austin Hill	Austin Hill Racing	Ford	Arco Design & Build
21	Johnny Sauter	GMS Racing	Chevrolet	Allegiant Air
22	Austin Wayne Self (R)	AM Racing	Toyota	AM Technical Solutions
23	Spencer Gallagher	GMS Racing	Chevrolet	Alamo Rent a Car
29	Tyler Reddick	Brad Keselowski Racing	Ford	Cooper-Standard Automotive
32	Justin Marks (i)	Braun Motorsports	Toyota	Katerra
33	Grant Enfinger (R)	GMS Racing	Chevrolet	Alamo Rent a Car
41	Ben Rhodes (R)	ThorSport Racing	Toyota	Alpha Energy Solutions
44	Tommy Joe Martins	Martins Motorsports	Chevrolet	ClikIt.tv, Diamond Gusset Jeans
49	Timmy Hill	Premium Motorsports	Chevrolet	Dirk and Rock
50	Ryan Ellis (i)	MAKE Motorsports	Chevrolet	MAKE Motorsports
51	Daniel Suárez (i)	Kyle Busch Motorsports	Toyota	Arris
59	Korbin Forrister	Lira Motorsports	Ford	Tilted Kilt, MOMO, The Sports Agency
63	Garrett Smithley (i)	MB Motorsports	Chevrolet	Instalco
66	Jordan Anderson	Bolen Motorsports	Chevrolet	Columbia SC - Famously Hot
71	Carlos Contreras	Contreras Motorsports	Chevrolet	RaceTrac
74	Tim Viens	Mike Harmon Racing	Chevrolet	RaceDaySponsor.com
75	Caleb Holman	Henderson Motorsports	Toyota	Food Country USA, Lay's
81	Ryan Truex	Hattori Racing Enterprises	Toyota	Aisin
86	Brandon Brown	Brandonbilt Motorsports	Chevrolet	Ncaselt, Coastal Carolina University
88	Matt Crafton	ThorSport Racing	Toyota	Hormel, Menards
92	Parker Kligerman	RBR Enterprises	Ford	Black's Tire Service
98	Rico Abreu (R)	ThorSport Racing	Toyota	Safelite
Official entry list

== Practice ==
=== First practice ===
The first practice session was held on Friday, February 26, at 10:00 AM EST, and would last for 55 minutes. Grant Enfinger, driving for GMS Racing, would set the fastest time in the session, with a lap of 30.873, and an average speed of 179.574 mph (288.996 km/h).

Pos.	#	Driver	Team	Make	Time	Speed
1	33	Grant Enfinger (R)	GMS Racing	Chevrolet	30.873	179.574
2	4	Christopher Bell (R)	Kyle Busch Motorsports	Toyota	31.004	178.816
3	88	Matt Crafton	ThorSport Racing	Toyota	31.092	178.310
Full first practice results

=== Second practice ===
The second practice session was held on Friday, February 26, at 1:30 PM EST, and would last for 55 minutes. John Wes Townley, driving for his family team, Athenian Motorsports, would set the fastest time in the session, with a lap of 31.107, and an average speed of 178.224 mph (286.824 km/h).

Pos.	#	Driver	Team	Make	Time	Speed
1	05	John Wes Townley	Athenian Motorsports	Chevrolet	31.107	178.224
2	19	Daniel Hemric	Brad Keselowski Racing	Ford	31.182	177.795
3	9	William Byron (R)	Kyle Busch Motorsports	Toyota	31.257	177.368
Full second practice results

=== Final practice ===
The final practice session was held on Friday, February 26, at 4:00 PM EST, and would last for 85 minutes. Grant Enfinger, driving for GMS Racing, would set the fastest time in the session, with a lap of 31.011, and an average speed of 178.775 mph (287.710 km/h).

Pos.	#	Driver	Team	Make	Time	Speed
1	33	Grant Enfinger (R)	GMS Racing	Chevrolet	31.011	178.775
2	88	Matt Crafton	ThorSport Racing	Toyota	31.146	178.000
3	4	Christopher Bell (R)	Kyle Busch Motorsports	Toyota	31.157	177.938
Full final practice results

== Qualifying ==
Qualifying was held on Saturday, February 27, at 10:00 AM EST. Since Atlanta Motor Speedway is at least 2.0 miles (3.2 km), the qualifying system was a single car, single lap, two round system where in the first round, everyone would set a time to determine positions 13–32. Then, the fastest 12 qualifiers would move on to the second round to determine positions 1–12.

Matt Crafton, driving for ThorSport Racing, would win the pole, setting a lap of 30.836, and an average speed of 179.790 mph (289.344 km/h) in the second round.

Five drivers would fail to qualify: Jordan Anderson, Korbin Forrister, Norm Benning, Tim Viens, and Ryan Ellis.

=== Full qualifying results ===
Pos.	#	Driver	Team	Make	Time (R1)	Speed (R1)	Time (R2)	Speed (R2)
1	88	Matt Crafton	ThorSport Racing	Toyota	30.969	179.018	30.836	179.790
2	05	John Wes Townley	Athenian Motorsports	Chevrolet	30.947	179.145	30.854	179.685
3	4	Christopher Bell (R)	Kyle Busch Motorsports	Toyota	30.817	179.901	30.858	179.662
4	33	Grant Enfinger (R)	GMS Racing	Chevrolet	30.883	179.516	30.908	179.371
5	13	Cameron Hayley	ThorSport Racing	Toyota	31.076	178.401	31.014	178.758
6	00	Cole Custer (R)	JR Motorsports	Chevrolet	31.125	178.120	31.036	178.631
7	41	Ben Rhodes (R)	ThorSport Racing	Toyota	31.108	178.218	31.068	178.447
8	81	Ryan Truex	Hattori Racing Enterprises	Toyota	31.145	178.006	31.071	178.430
9	19	Daniel Hemric	Brad Keselowski Racing	Ford	31.107	178.224	31.083	178.361
10	11	Ben Kennedy	Red Horse Racing	Toyota	31.116	178.172	31.089	178.327
11	23	Spencer Gallagher	GMS Racing	Chevrolet	31.174	177.841	31.132	178.080
12	17	Timothy Peters	Red Horse Racing	Toyota	31.227	177.539	31.209	177.641
Eliminated in Round 1
13	51	Daniel Suárez (i)	Kyle Busch Motorsports	Toyota	31.250	177.408	-	-
14	32	Justin Marks (i)	Braun Motorsports	Toyota	31.262	177.340	-	-
15	9	William Byron (R)	Kyle Busch Motorsports	Toyota	31.265	177.323	-	-
16	21	Johnny Sauter	GMS Racing	Chevrolet	31.287	177.198	-	-
17	92	Parker Kligerman	RBR Enterprises	Ford	31.317	177.028	-	-
18	8	John Hunter Nemechek	NEMCO Motorsports	Chevrolet	31.371	176.724	-	-
19	63	Garrett Smithley (i)	MB Motorsports	Chevrolet	31.412	176.493	-	-
20	22	Austin Wayne Self (R)	AM Racing	Toyota	31.438	176.347	-	-
21	29	Tyler Reddick	Brad Keselowski Racing	Ford	31.439	176.341	-	-
22	02	Tyler Young	Young's Motorsports	Chevrolet	31.528	175.844	-	-
23	20	Austin Hill	Austin Hill Racing	Ford	31.546	175.743	-	-
24	86	Brandon Brown	Brandonbilt Motorsports	Chevrolet	31.547	175.738	-	-
25	75	Caleb Holman	Henderson Motorsports	Toyota	31.571	175.604	-	-
26	07	J. J. Yeley (i)	SS-Green Light Racing	Chevrolet	31.618	175.343	-	-
27	98	Rico Abreu (R)	ThorSport Racing	Toyota	31.665	175.083	-	-
Qualified by owner's points
28	44	Tommy Joe Martins	Martins Motorsports	Chevrolet	31.730	174.724	-	-
29	1	Travis Kvapil	MAKE Motorsports	Chevrolet	31.795	174.367	-	-
30	49	Timmy Hill	Premium Motorsports	Chevrolet	31.930	173.630	-	-
31	71	Carlos Contreras	Contreras Motorsports	Chevrolet	31.950	173.521	-	-
32	10	Jennifer Jo Cobb	Jennifer Jo Cobb Racing	Chevrolet	-	-	-	-
Failed to qualify
33	66	Jordan Anderson	Bolen Motorsports	Chevrolet	31.848	174.077	-	-
34	59	Korbin Forrister	Lira Motorsports	Ford	32.319	171.540	-	-
35	6	Norm Benning	Norm Benning Racing	Chevrolet	33.383	166.073	-	-
36	74	Tim Viens	Mike Harmon Racing	Chevrolet	-	-	-	-
37	50	Ryan Ellis (i)	MAKE Motorsports	Chevrolet	-	-	-	-
Official qualifying results
Official starting lineup

== Race ==
=== Race recap ===
Matt Crafton and John Wes Townley would lead the field to the green flag. On the initial restart, Townley would spin his tires, resulting him losing several positions. Christopher Bell advanced to the second spot, and eventually took the lead from Crafton on lap 7. After leading 20 laps, Bell's right front tire would go down, giving the lead back to Crafton. He would maintain the lead, until the first caution clock expired on lap 38. On the second restart, Johnny Sauter's truck would lose power, and was forced to make an unscheduled pit stop. He drove past his pit stall and entered the track again, thinking that his truck would get up to speed again, which was unsuccessful. He went to the garage to replace the ignition box, and eventually returned to the race several laps later. The second caution came out at lap 60, after William Byron suffered a blown engine. Tyler Reddick made an unscheduled pit stop during the third restart, after reporting a vibration. Red Horse Racing teammates, Timothy Peters and Ben Kennedy, also had unscheduled pit stops, as Peters suffered a vibration, and Kennedy's shifter would pop out of place. Crafton would continue to lead, until Bell made his way back to front, and retook the lead with around 40 laps to go. The second caution clock would expire with 25 laps to go. John Hunter Nemechek and Crafton lead the field back to green flag. Spencer Gallagher would spin his tires, causing the outside lane to have a slow restart. As a result, Daniel Suárez would move into second, and immediately went to the outside lane to try and pass Crafton for the lead. The two were side by side coming into turn two. As they were exiting turn two, Bell would accidentally turn Suárez sideways, causing him to hit the side of Crafton's truck. They would spin in front of the field, with Crafton and Suárez receiving numerous damage. Surprisingly, everyone would make it through the wreck. The race would go under red flag to assess all the damage.

=== Final laps ===
The field would restart with 15 laps to go, with Nemechek and Cameron Hayley leading the field. Bell would quickly take the lead back a lap later. He would suddenly blow a tire with 8 laps to go, causing him to hit the outside wall hard. Nemechek and Townley would lead the field on the final restart with 2 laps to go. Townley would spin his tires once again, causing Cameron Hayley to advance into the second spot. Nemechek held off Hayley in the final 2 laps, and would earn his second career NASCAR Camping World Truck Series win. Hayley, Peters, Hemric, and Enfinger would round out the top 5.

== Race results ==
Fin	St	#	Driver	Team	Make	Laps	Led	Status	Pts
1	18	8	John Hunter Nemechek	NEMCO Motorsports	Chevrolet	130	8	Running	36
2	5	13	Cameron Hayley	ThorSport Racing	Toyota	130	4	Running	32
3	12	17	Timothy Peters	Red Horse Racing	Toyota	130	0	Running	30
4	9	19	Daniel Hemric	Brad Keselowski Racing	Ford	130	0	Running	29
5	4	33	Grant Enfinger (R)	GMS Racing	Chevrolet	130	0	Running	28
6	7	41	Ben Rhodes (R)	ThorSport Racing	Toyota	130	0	Running	27
7	2	05	John Wes Townley	Athenian Motorsports	Chevrolet	130	0	Running	26
8	17	92	Parker Kligerman	RBR Enterprises	Ford	130	0	Running	25
9	25	75	Caleb Holman	Henderson Motorsports	Toyota	130	0	Running	24
10	11	23	Spencer Gallagher	GMS Racing	Chevrolet	130	0	Running	23
11	27	98	Rico Abreu (R)	ThorSport Racing	Toyota	130	0	Running	22
12	23	20	Austin Hill	Austin Hill Racing	Ford	130	0	Running	21
13	22	02	Tyler Young	Young's Motorsports	Chevrolet	130	0	Running	20
14	21	29	Tyler Reddick	Brad Keselowski Racing	Ford	130	0	Running	19
15	10	11	Ben Kennedy	Red Horse Racing	Toyota	130	0	Running	18
16	20	22	Austin Wayne Self (R)	AM Racing	Chevrolet	130	0	Running	17
17	6	00	Cole Custer (R)	JR Motorsports	Chevrolet	130	0	Running	16
18	19	63	Garrett Smithley (i)	MB Motorsports	Chevrolet	129	0	Running	0
19	24	86	Brandon Brown	Brandonbilt Motorsports	Chevrolet	128	0	Running	14
20	8	81	Ryan Truex	Hattori Racing Enterprises	Toyota	127	0	Running	13
21	30	49	Timmy Hill	Premium Motorsports	Chevrolet	127	0	Running	12
22	14	32	Justin Marks (i)	Braun Motorsports	Toyota	127	0	Running	0
23	29	1	Travis Kvapil	MAKE Motorsports	Chevrolet	127	0	Running	10
24	26	07	J. J. Yeley (i)	SS-Green Light Racing	Chevrolet	125	0	Running	0
25	28	44	Tommy Joe Martins	Martins Motorsports	Chevrolet	125	0	Running	8
26	3	4	Christopher Bell (R)	Kyle Busch Motorsports	Toyota	122	42	Accident	8
27	31	71	Carlos Contreras	Contreras Motorsports	Chevrolet	122	0	Running	6
28	16	21	Johnny Sauter	GMS Racing	Chevrolet	121	0	Running	5
29	32	10	Jennifer Jo Cobb	Jennifer Jo Cobb Racing	Chevrolet	120	0	Running	4
30	1	88	Matt Crafton	ThorSport Racing	Toyota	111	76	Accident	5
31	13	51	Daniel Suárez (i)	Kyle Busch Motorsports	Toyota	111	0	Accident	0
32	15	9	William Byron (R)	Kyle Busch Motorsports	Toyota	59	0	Engine	1
Official race results

== Standings after the race ==
Drivers' Championship standings

	Pos	Driver	Points
2	1	Parker Kligerman	55
6	2	Daniel Hemric	54 (-1)
12	3	John Hunter Nemechek	52 (–3)
9	4	Timothy Peters	49 (–6)
1	5	Tyler Young	47 (–8)
4	6	Ryan Truex	45 (–10)
3	7	Brandon Brown	43 (–12)
1	8	Ben Rhodes	43 (–12)
Official driver's standings

- Note: Only the first 8 positions are included for the driver standings.

Previous race: 2016 NextEra Energy Resources 250	NASCAR Camping World Truck Series; 2016 season	Next race: 2016 Alpha Energy Solutions 250
