= Contreras Motorsports =

Mexican professional stock car racing team

- Owner(s): Carlos Contreras; Enrique Contreras III
- Base: Mooresville, North Carolina
- Series: Camping World Truck Series
- Race drivers: 71. Brandon Hightower
- Manufacturer: Chevrolet Toyota
- Opened: 2012
- Closed: 2016

Career
- Debut: 2016 Great Clips 200 (Atlanta)
- Latest race: 2016 Ford EcoBoost 200
- Races competed: Total: 19; Camping World Truck Series: 22
- Drivers' Championships: Total: 0 Camping World Truck Series: 0
- Race victories: Total: 0 Camping World Truck Series: 0
- Pole positions: Total: 1 Camping World Truck Series: 1

Contreras Motorsports was a Mexican professional stock car racing team that competed in the NASCAR Camping World Truck Series. The team was owned by Carlos Contreras and his nephew Enrique. The team fielded the No. 71 Chevrolet Silverado full-time for various drivers. During operation, they were the sole Mexican team in the three national divisions of NASCAR.

== Camping World Truck Series ==
=== Truck No. 71 history ===
The No. 71 truck began racing in 2016. The team's debut race was the 2016 Great Clips 200 after they failed to qualify for the season opener at Daytona. Carlos Contreras drove the first race, with funding from RaceTrac convenience stores. Several up-and coming drivers raced for the team in its inaugural season, including JR Motorsports development driver Josh Berry and Israeli Alon Day. the team also brought in experienced drivers, such as Ken Schrader and Mike Bliss. It was announced on December 25 that Brandon Hightower would drive for the team full-time in 2017. However, this would end up not happening as the team sold its assets to Copp Motorsports in January.

=== Partnerships ===
==== JR Motorsports ====
On October 29, 2016, Contreras Motorsports ran a truck for Chase Elliott at Martinsville; the truck was built by JR Motorsports. He qualified on the pole and finished second.

==== Ranier Racing with MDM ====
Ranier Racing with MDM ran some races in 2016 with the No. 71 with Austin Dillon and Brandon Jones driving. Jones drove at Dover, Charlotte, Iowa, Kentucky and Bristol. Dillon drove at Texas. Between the two drivers, they recorded three top-ten finishes.

==== Ken Schrader Racing ====
In 2016 Contreras Motorsports partnered with Ken Schrader Racing to run the Aspen Dental Eldora Dirt Derby in the No. 71 Toyota Tundra. Ken Schrader drove the truck sponsored by Hunt Brothers Pizza. Schrader drove the truck to a 12th-place finish.

==== Truck No. 71 results ====
Year	Team	No.	Make	1	2	3	4	5	6	7	8	9	10	11	12	13	14	15	16	17	18	19	20	21	22	23	NCWTC	Pts
2016	Carlos Contreras	71	Chevy	DAY; DNQ	ATL; 27					TEX; 31					POC; 27						LVS; 30						20th	288
2016	Mike Bliss	71	Chevy			MAR; 30	KAN; 17																				20th	288
2016	Brandon Jones	71	Chevy					DOV; 20	CLT; 11		IOW; 17		KEN; 7			BRI; 9											20th	288
2016	Enrique Contreras III	71	Chevy									GTW; 20					MCH; 28										20th	288
2016	Ken Schrader	71	Toyota											ELD; 12													20th	288
2016	Camden Murphy	71	Chevy															MSP; 31									20th	288
2016	Josh Berry	71	Chevy																CHI; 13								20th	288
2016	Alon Day	71	Chevy																	NHA; 24						HOM; 26	20th	288
2016	Brandon Hightower	71	Chevy																			TAL; 30					20th	288
2016	Chase Elliott	71	Chevy																				MAR; 2*				20th	288
2016	Austin Dillon	71	Chevy																					TEX; 8			20th	288
2016	Kevin Donahue	71	Chevy																						PHO; 20		20th	288

== Ending of operations ==
Before the 2017 season, the assets and ownership of the team was transferred to business partner and crew veteran D. J. Copp to form Copp Motorsports.
