= 2018 Lilly Diabetes 250 =

25th race of the 2018 NASCAR Xfinity Series

Race details
- Race 25 of 33 in the 2018 NASCAR Xfinity Series season
- Date: September 10, 2018
- Location: Indianapolis Motor Speedway in Speedway, Indiana
- Course: Permanent racing facility
- Course length: 2.5 miles (4 km)
- Distance: 100 laps, 250 mi (400 km)
- Average speed: 112.038 miles per hour (180.308 km/h)

Pole position
| Driver | Ryan Blaney | Team Penske |
- Time: N/A

Most laps led
| Driver | Justin Allgaier | JR Motorsports |
- Laps: 41

Winner
| No. 7 | Justin Allgaier | JR Motorsports |

Television in the United States
- Network: NBCSN

Radio in the United States
- Radio: PRN

The 2018 Lilly Diabetes 250 was a NASCAR Xfinity Series race held on September 10, 2018, at Indianapolis Motor Speedway in Speedway, Indiana. Contested over 100 laps on the 2.5-mile (4.0 km) speedway, it was the 25th race of the 2018 NASCAR Xfinity Series season.

== Entry list ==
| No. | Driver | Team | Manufacturer |
|---|---|---|---|
| 0 | Garrett Smithley | JD Motorsports | Chevrolet |
| 00 | Cole Custer | Stewart-Haas Racing with Biagi-DenBeste Racing | Ford |
| 01 | Vinnie Miller (R) | JD Motorsports | Chevrolet |
| 1 | Elliott Sadler | JR Motorsports | Chevrolet |
| 2 | Matt Tifft | Richard Childress Racing | Chevrolet |
| 3 | Ty Dillon (i) | Richard Childress Racing | Chevrolet |
| 4 | Ross Chastain | JD Motorsports | Chevrolet |
| 5 | Michael Annett | JR Motorsports | Chevrolet |
| 7 | Justin Allgaier | JR Motorsports | Chevrolet |
| 8 | Caesar Bacarella | B. J. McLeod Motorsports | Chevrolet |
| 9 | Tyler Reddick (R) | JR Motorsports | Chevrolet |
| 10 | Austin Dillon (i) | Kaulig Racing | Chevrolet |
| 11 | Ryan Truex | Kaulig Racing | Chevrolet |
| 12 | Austin Cindric (R) | Team Penske | Ford |
| 13 | Timmy Hill | MBM Motorsports | Dodge |
| 15 | B. J. McLeod | JD Motorsports | Chevrolet |
| 16 | Ryan Reed | Roush Fenway Racing | Ford |
| 18 | Ryan Preece | Joe Gibbs Racing | Toyota |
| 19 | Brandon Jones | Joe Gibbs Racing | Toyota |
| 20 | Christopher Bell (R) | Joe Gibbs Racing | Toyota |
| 21 | Daniel Hemric | Richard Childress Racing | Chevrolet |
| 22 | Ryan Blaney (i) | Team Penske | Ford |
| 23 | Chase Elliott (i) | GMS Racing | Chevrolet |
| 35 | Joey Gase | Go Green Racing | Chevrolet |
| 36 | Alex Labbé (R) | DGM Racing | Chevrolet |
| 38 | J. J. Yeley | RSS Racing | Chevrolet |
| 39 | Ryan Sieg | RSS Racing | Chevrolet |
| 40 | Chad Finchum (R) | MBM Motorsports | Toyota |
| 42 | John Hunter Nemechek | Chip Ganassi Racing | Chevrolet |
| 45 | Josh Bilicki (R) | JP Motorsports | Toyota |
| 51 | Jeremy Clements | Jeremy Clements Racing | Chevrolet |
| 52 | David Starr | Jimmy Means Racing | Chevrolet |
| 55 | Bayley Currey (i) | JP Motorsports | Toyota |
| 60 | Chase Briscoe | Roush Fenway Racing | Ford |
| 66 | Brandon Hightower | MBM Motorsports | Dodge |
| 74 | Mike Harmon | Mike Harmon Racing | Chevrolet |
| 76 | Spencer Boyd (R) | SS-Green Light Racing | Chevrolet |
| 78 | Tommy Joe Martins | B. J. McLeod Motorsports | Chevrolet |
| 89 | Morgan Shepherd | Shepherd Racing Ventures | Chevrolet |
| 90 | Josh Williams | DGM Racing | Chevrolet |
| 93 | Jeff Green | RSS Racing | Chevrolet |

== Practice ==
Both practice sessions for the race were cancelled due to rain.

== Qualifying ==
Qualifying for the race was cancelled due to rain. Ryan Blaney won the pole based on owner's points.

=== Starting lineup ===
| Pos | No. | Driver | Team | Manufacturer |
|---|---|---|---|---|
| 1 | 22 | Ryan Blaney (i) | Team Penske | Ford |
| 2 | 7 | Justin Allgaier | JR Motorsports | Chevrolet |
| 3 | 18 | Ryan Preece | Joe Gibbs Racing | Toyota |
| 4 | 1 | Elliott Sadler | JR Motorsports | Chevrolet |
| 5 | 00 | Cole Custer | Stewart-Haas Racing with Biagi-DenBeste Racing | Ford |
| 6 | 42 | John Hunter Nemechek | Chip Ganassi Racing | Chevrolet |
| 7 | 20 | Christopher Bell (R) | Joe Gibbs Racing | Toyota |
| 8 | 21 | Daniel Hemric | Richard Childress Racing | Chevrolet |
| 9 | 9 | Tyler Reddick (R) | JR Motorsports | Chevrolet |
| 10 | 23 | Chase Elliott (i) | GMS Racing | Chevrolet |
| 11 | 19 | Brandon Jones | Joe Gibbs Racing | Toyota |
| 12 | 2 | Matt Tifft | Richard Childress Racing | Chevrolet |
| 13 | 11 | Ryan Truex | Kaulig Racing | Chevrolet |
| 14 | 3 | Ty Dillon (i) | Richard Childress Racing | Chevrolet |
| 15 | 16 | Ryan Reed | Roush Fenway Racing | Ford |
| 16 | 4 | Ross Chastain | JD Motorsports | Chevrolet |
| 17 | 5 | Michael Annett | JR Motorsports | Chevrolet |
| 18 | 51 | Jeremy Clements | Jeremy Clements Racing | Chevrolet |
| 19 | 39 | Ryan Sieg | RSS Racing | Chevrolet |
| 20 | 36 | Alex Labbé (R) | DGM Racing | Chevrolet |
| 21 | 35 | Joey Gase | Go Green Racing | Chevrolet |
| 22 | 60 | Chase Briscoe | Roush Fenway Racing | Ford |
| 23 | 0 | Garrett Smithley | JD Motorsports | Chevrolet |
| 24 | 78 | Tommy Joe Martins | B. J. McLeod Motorsports | Chevrolet |
| 25 | 90 | Josh Williams | DGM Racing | Chevrolet |
| 26 | 8 | Caesar Bacarella | B. J. McLeod Motorsports | Chevrolet |
| 27 | 38 | J. J. Yeley | RSS Racing | Chevrolet |
| 28 | 15 | B. J. McLeod | JD Motorsports | Chevrolet |
| 29 | 52 | David Starr | Jimmy Means Racing | Chevrolet |
| 30 | 01 | Vinnie Miller (R) | JD Motorsports | Chevrolet |
| 31 | 12 | Austin Cindric (R) | Team Penske | Ford |
| 32 | 10 | Austin Dillon (i) | Kaulig Racing | Chevrolet |
| 33 | 93 | Jeff Green | RSS Racing | Chevrolet |
| 34 | 76 | Spencer Boyd (R) | SS-Green Light Racing | Chevrolet |
| 35 | 45 | Josh Bilicki (R) | JP Motorsports | Toyota |
| 36 | 40 | Chad Finchum (R) | MBM Motorsports | Toyota |
| 37 | 66 | Brandon Hightower | MBM Motorsports | Dodge |
| 38 | 74 | Mike Harmon | Mike Harmon Racing | Chevrolet |
| 39 | 55 | Bayley Currey (i) | JP Motorsports | Toyota |
| 40 | 89 | Morgan Shepherd | Shepherd Racing Ventures | Chevrolet |
Did not qualify
| 41 | 13 | Timmy Hill | MBM Motorsports | Dodge |

== Race ==
=== Stage Results ===
Stage 1

| Pos | No | Driver | Team | Manufacturer | Points |
|---|---|---|---|---|---|
| 1 | 42 | John Hunter Nemechek | Chip Ganassi Racing | Chevrolet | 10 |
| 2 | 18 | Ryan Preece | Joe Gibbs Racing | Toyota | 9 |
| 3 | 00 | Cole Custer | Stewart-Haas Racing with Biagi-DenBeste | Ford | 8 |
| 4 | 7 | Justin Allgaier | JR Motorsports | Chevrolet | 7 |
| 5 | 2 | Matt Tifft | Richard Childress Racing | Chevrolet | 6 |
| 6 | 23 | Chase Elliott (i) | GMS Racing | Chevrolet | 0 |
| 7 | 19 | Brandon Jones | Joe Gibbs Racing | Toyota | 4 |
| 8 | 9 | Tyler Reddick (R) | JR Motorsports | Chevrolet | 3 |
| 9 | 21 | Daniel Hemric | Richard Childress Racing | Chevrolet | 2 |
| 10 | 10 | Austin Dillon (i) | Kaulig Racing | Chevrolet | 0 |

Stage 2

| Pos | No | Driver | Team | Manufacturer | Points |
|---|---|---|---|---|---|
| 1 | 21 | Daniel Hemric | Richard Childress Racing | Chevrolet | 10 |
| 2 | 20 | Christopher Bell (R) | Joe Gibbs Racing | Toyota | 9 |
| 3 | 7 | Justin Allgaier | JR Motorsports | Chevrolet | 8 |
| 4 | 00 | Cole Custer | Stewart-Haas Racing with Biagi-DenBeste | Ford | 7 |
| 5 | 18 | Ryan Preece | Joe Gibbs Racing | Toyota | 6 |
| 6 | 19 | Brandon Jones | Joe Gibbs Racing | Toyota | 5 |
| 7 | 11 | Ryan Truex | Kaulig Racing | Chevrolet | 4 |
| 8 | 42 | John Hunter Nemechek | Chip Ganassi Racing | Chevrolet | 3 |
| 9 | 4 | Ross Chastain | JD Motorsports | Chevrolet | 2 |
| 10 | 39 | Ryan Sieg | RSS Racing | Chevrolet | 1 |

=== Final Stage Results ===
Stage 3

| Pos | Grid | No | Driver | Team | Manufacturer | Laps | Points |
|---|---|---|---|---|---|---|---|
| 1 | 2 | 7 | Justin Allgaier | JR Motorsports | Chevrolet | 100 | 55 |
| 2 | 9 | 9 | Tyler Reddick (R) | JR Motorsports | Chevrolet | 100 | 38 |
| 3 | 1 | 22 | Ryan Blaney (i) | Team Penske | Ford | 100 | 0 |
| 4 | 10 | 23 | Chase Elliott (i) | GMS Racing | Chevrolet | 100 | 0 |
| 5 | 8 | 21 | Daniel Hemric | Richard Childress Racing | Chevrolet | 100 | 44 |
| 6 | 12 | 2 | Matt Tifft | Richard Childress Racing | Chevrolet | 100 | 37 |
| 7 | 7 | 20 | Christopher Bell (R) | Joe Gibbs Racing | Toyota | 100 | 39 |
| 8 | 32 | 10 | Austin Dillon (i) | Kaulig Racing | Chevrolet | 100 | 0 |
| 9 | 22 | 60 | Chase Briscoe | Roush Fenway Racing | Ford | 100 | 28 |
| 10 | 11 | 19 | Brandon Jones | Joe Gibbs Racing | Toyota | 100 | 36 |
| 11 | 15 | 16 | Ryan Reed | Roush Fenway Racing | Ford | 100 | 26 |
| 12 | 16 | 4 | Ross Chastain | JD Motorsports | Chevrolet | 100 | 27 |
| 13 | 19 | 39 | Ryan Sieg | RSS Racing | Chevrolet | 100 | 25 |
| 14 | 18 | 51 | Jeremy Clements | Jeremy Clements Racing | Chevrolet | 100 | 23 |
| 15 | 21 | 35 | Joey Gase | Go Green Racing | Chevrolet | 100 | 22 |
| 16 | 28 | 15 | B. J. McLeod | JD Motorsports | Chevrolet | 100 | 21 |
| 17 | 30 | 01 | Vinnie Miller (R) | JD Motorsports | Chevrolet | 99 | 20 |
| 18 | 29 | 52 | David Starr | Jimmy Means Racing | Chevrolet | 99 | 19 |
| 19 | 20 | 36 | Alex Labbé (R) | DGM Racing | Chevrolet | 98 | 18 |
| 20 | 23 | 0 | Garrett Smithley | JD Motorsports | Chevrolet | 98 | 17 |
| 21 | 36 | 40 | Chad Finchum (R) | MBM Motorsports | Chevrolet | 98 | 16 |
| 22 | 13 | 11 | Ryan Truex | Kaulig Racing | Chevrolet | 97 | 19 |
| 23 | 26 | 8 | Caesar Bacarella | B. J. McLeod Motorsports | Chevrolet | 93 | 14 |
| 24 | 25 | 90 | Josh Williams | DGM Racing | Chevrolet | 92 | 13 |
| 25 | 6 | 42 | John Hunter Nemechek | Chip Ganassi Racing | Chevrolet | 90 | 25 |
| 26 | 38 | 74 | Mike Harmon | Mike Harmon Racing | Chevrolet | 85 | 11 |
| 27 | 24 | 78 | Tommy Joe Martins | B. J. McLeod Motorsports | Chevrolet | 83 | 10 |
| 28 | 3 | 18 | Ryan Preece | Joe Gibbs Racing | Toyota | 78 | 24 |
| 29 | 5 | 00 | Cole Custer | Stewart-Haas Racing with Biagi-DenBeste | Ford | 71 | 23 |
| 30 | 27 | 38 | J. J. Yeley | RSS Racing | Chevrolet | 67 | 7 |
| 31 | 17 | 5 | Michael Annett | JR Motorsports | Chevrolet | 51 | 6 |
| 32 | 40 | 89 | Morgan Shepherd | Shepherd Racing Ventures | Chevrolet | 34 | 5 |
| 33 | 14 | 3 | Ty Dillon (i) | Richard Childress Racing | Chevrolet | 34 | 0 |
| 34 | 31 | 12 | Austin Cindric | Team Penske | Ford | 24 | 3 |
| 35 | 4 | 1 | Elliott Sadler | JR Motorsports | Chevrolet | 22 | 2 |
| 36 | 34 | 76 | Spencer Boyd (R) | SS-Green Light Racing | Chevrolet | 22 | 1 |
| 37 | 37 | 66 | Brandon Hightower | MBM Motorsports | Dodge | 20 | 1 |
| 38 | 35 | 45 | Josh Bilicki (R) | JP Motorsports | Toyota | 19 | 1 |
| 39 | 39 | 55 | Bayley Currey (i) | JP Motorsports | Toyota | 14 | 0 |
| 40 | 33 | 93 | Jeff Green | RSS Racing | Chevrolet | 8 | 1 |

| Previous race: 2018 Sport Clips Haircuts VFW 200 | NASCAR Xfinity Series; 2018 season | Next race: 2018 DC Solar 300 |
