= Brandon Hightower =

American racing driver (born 1998)

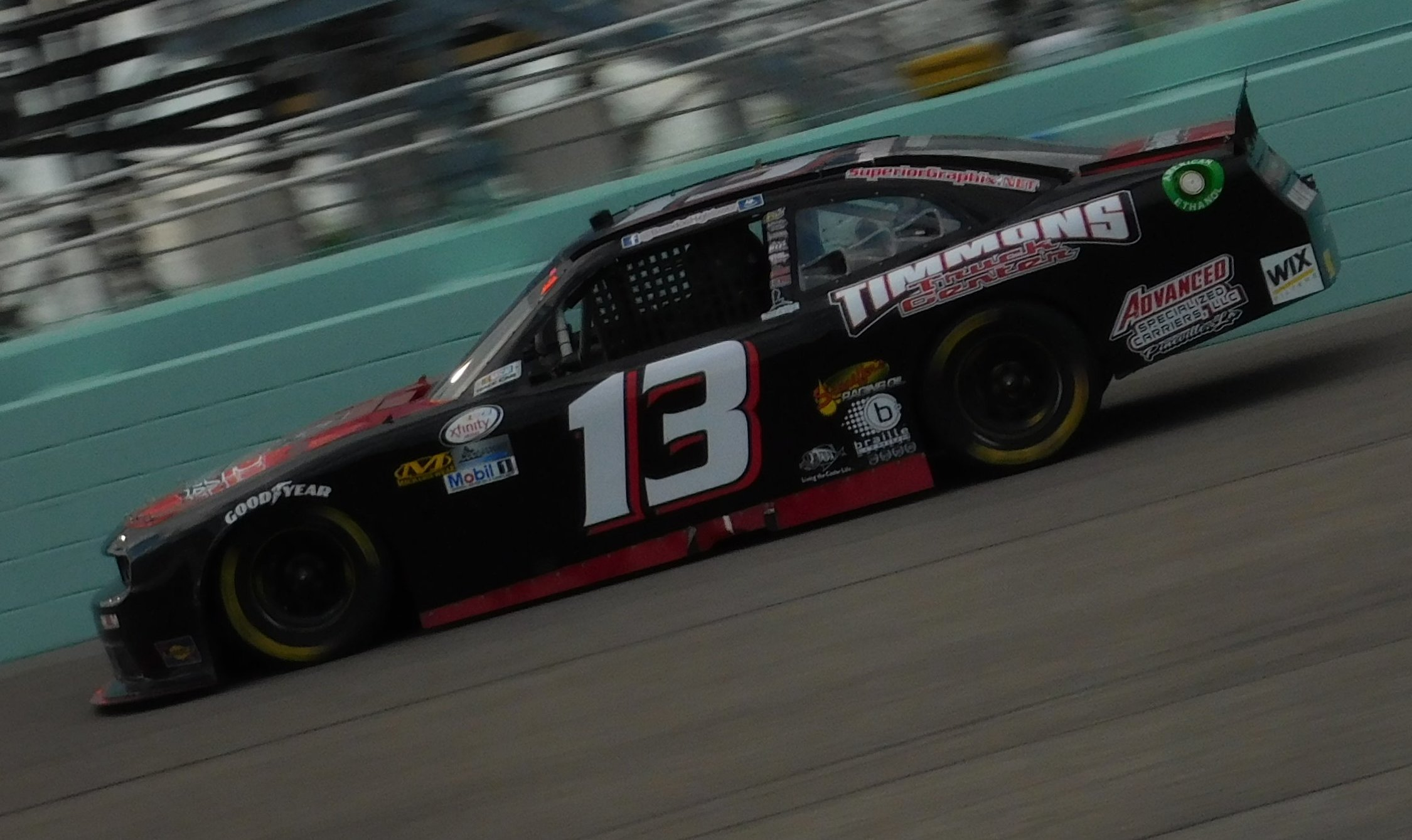
- Hightower's Xfinity Series car in 2016
- Born: Brandon Allen Hightower; March 17, 1998 (age 28); Deville, Louisiana, U.S.
- Height: 5 ft 11 in (1.80 m)
- Weight: 150 lb (68 kg)
- Awards: Ark-La-Tex Wing Modified Rookie of the Year (2012)

NASCAR O'Reilly Auto Parts Series career
- 19 races run over 3 years
- 2018 position: 45th
- Best finish: 43rd (2016)
- First race: 2016 Virginia 529 College Savings 250 (Richmond)
- Last race: 2018 Lilly Diabetes 250 (Indianapolis)
Wins	Top tens	Poles
0	0	0

NASCAR FedEx Freight Truck Series career
- 3 races run over 3 years
- 2017 position: 93rd
- Best finish: 73rd (2015)
- First race: 2015 Kroger 200 (Martinsville)
- Last race: 2017 Eldora Dirt Derby (Eldora)
Wins	Top tens	Poles
0	0	0
- Statistics up to date as of November 17, 2018.

Brandon Allen Hightower (born March 17, 1998) is an American professional racing driver who currently competes racing sprint cars. He has also raced stock cars, driving in the NASCAR Xfinity Series for MBM Motorsports, JP Motorsports and JD Motorsports, and the NASCAR Camping World Truck Series for MB Motorsports, Contreras Motorsports, B. J. McLeod Motorsports and TJL Motorsports.

== Racing career ==
=== Early years ===
Starting at the age of 14, Hightower raced on local dirt tracks, eventually fostering a connection with NASCAR driver David Starr after a chance meeting at a truck stop.

=== Xfinity Series ===
Hightower made his NASCAR Xfinity Series debut in late 2016, driving the No. 13 for MBM Motorsports at Richmond International Raceway. After finishing 35th in the race, he ran six more for MBM to close out the season. His best finish was 25th, which came at Dover International Speedway. He ran three races in early 2017, also with MBM.

On May 22, 2018, it was announced that Hightower would take over JP Motorsports' No. 55 entry for the remainder of the 2018 NASCAR Xfinity Series season, replacing Stephen Leicht. Hightower drove seven races for the team before suddenly leaving the team; a lawsuit was eventually filed by Hightower against the team but was later dropped. Hightower later said that he would rather race sprint cars than pay $40,000 to drive stock cars like he was paying at JPM. Days later, Hightower announced that he would run the rest of the season's oval races with JD Motorsports, but Iowa was the only race that Hightower drove for JD.

=== Camping World Truck Series ===
In 2015, Hightower made his NASCAR Camping World Truck Series debut in 2015, driving for MB Motorsports at Martinsville Speedway. He finished 27th. One start in 2016, for Contreras Motorsports, yielded a crash at Talladega Superspeedway. Contreras Motorsports announced during the offseason that Hightower would drive full time. He was left without a ride, however, when Contreras shut down the team and sold the assets to D.J. Copp, who formed Copp Motorsports. Hightower returned to his dirt roots at Eldora in 2017, driving the number 1 truck for TJL Motorsports.

== Motorsports career results ==
=== NASCAR ===
(key) (Bold – Pole position awarded by qualifying time. Italics – Pole position earned by points standings or practice time. * – Most laps led.)

==== Xfinity Series ====
NASCAR Xfinity Series results
Year	Team	No.	Make	1	2	3	4	5	6	7	8	9	10	11	12	13	14	15	16	17	18	19	20	21	22	23	24	25	26	27	28	29	30	31	32	33	NXSC	Pts	Ref
2016	MBM Motorsports	13	Dodge	DAY	ATL	LVS	PHO	CAL	TEX	BRI	RCH	TAL	DOV	CLT	POC	MCH	IOW	DAY	KEN	NHA	IND	IOW	GLN	MOH	BRI	ROA	DAR	RCH; 35	CHI	KEN	DOV; 25	CLT; 34	KAN; 39	TEX; 35	PHO; 26	HOM; 30	43rd	63	
2017	MBM Motorsports	40	Toyota	DAY; 13	ATL																																54th	26	
2017	MBM Motorsports	13	Chevy			LVS; 38	PHO																														54th	26	
2017	MBM Motorsports	40	Dodge					CAL; 38	TEX	BRI	RCH	TAL	CLT	DOV	POC	MCH	IOW	DAY	KEN	NHA	IND	IOW	GLN	MOH	BRI	ROA	DAR	RCH	CHI	KEN	DOV	CLT	KAN	TEX	PHO	HOM	54th	26	
2018	JP Motorsports	55	Toyota	DAY	ATL	LVS	PHO	CAL	TEX	BRI	RCH	TAL	DOV	CLT; 27	POC; 32	MCH; 35	IOW; 30	CHI; 26	DAY; 30	KEN; 26	NHA																45th	64	
2018	JD Motorsports	15	Chevy																			IOW; 27	GLN	MOH	BRI	ROA	DAR										45th	64	
2018	MBM Motorsports	66	Dodge																									IND; 37	LVS	RCH	CLT	DOV	KAN	TEX	PHO	HOM	45th	64	

==== Camping World Truck Series ====
NASCAR Camping World Truck Series results
Year	Team	No.	Make	1	2	3	4	5	6	7	8	9	10	11	12	13	14	15	16	17	18	19	20	21	22	23	NCWTC	Pts	Ref
2015	MB Motorsports	08	Chevy	DAY	ATL	MAR	KAN	CLT	DOV	TEX	GTW	IOW	KEN	ELD	POC	MCH	BRI	MSP	CHI	NHA	LVS	TAL	MAR; 27	TEX			73rd	17	
2015	B. J. McLeod Motorsports	45	Chevy																						PHO; DNQ	HOM	73rd	17	
2016	Contreras Motorsports	71	Chevy	DAY	ATL	MAR	KAN	DOV	CLT	TEX	IOW	GTW	KEN	ELD	POC	BRI	MCH	MSP	CHI	NHA	LVS	TAL; 30	MAR	TEX	PHO	HOM	109th	0^{1}	
2017	TJL Motorsports	1	Chevy	DAY	ATL	MAR	KAN	CLT	DOV	TEX	GTW	IOW	KEN	ELD; 24	POC	MCH	BRI	MSP	CHI	NHA	LVS	TAL	MAR	TEX	PHO	HOM	93rd	0^{1}	

^{*} Season still in progress
^{1} Ineligible for series points
