= Spencer Gallagher =

American racing driver (born 1989)

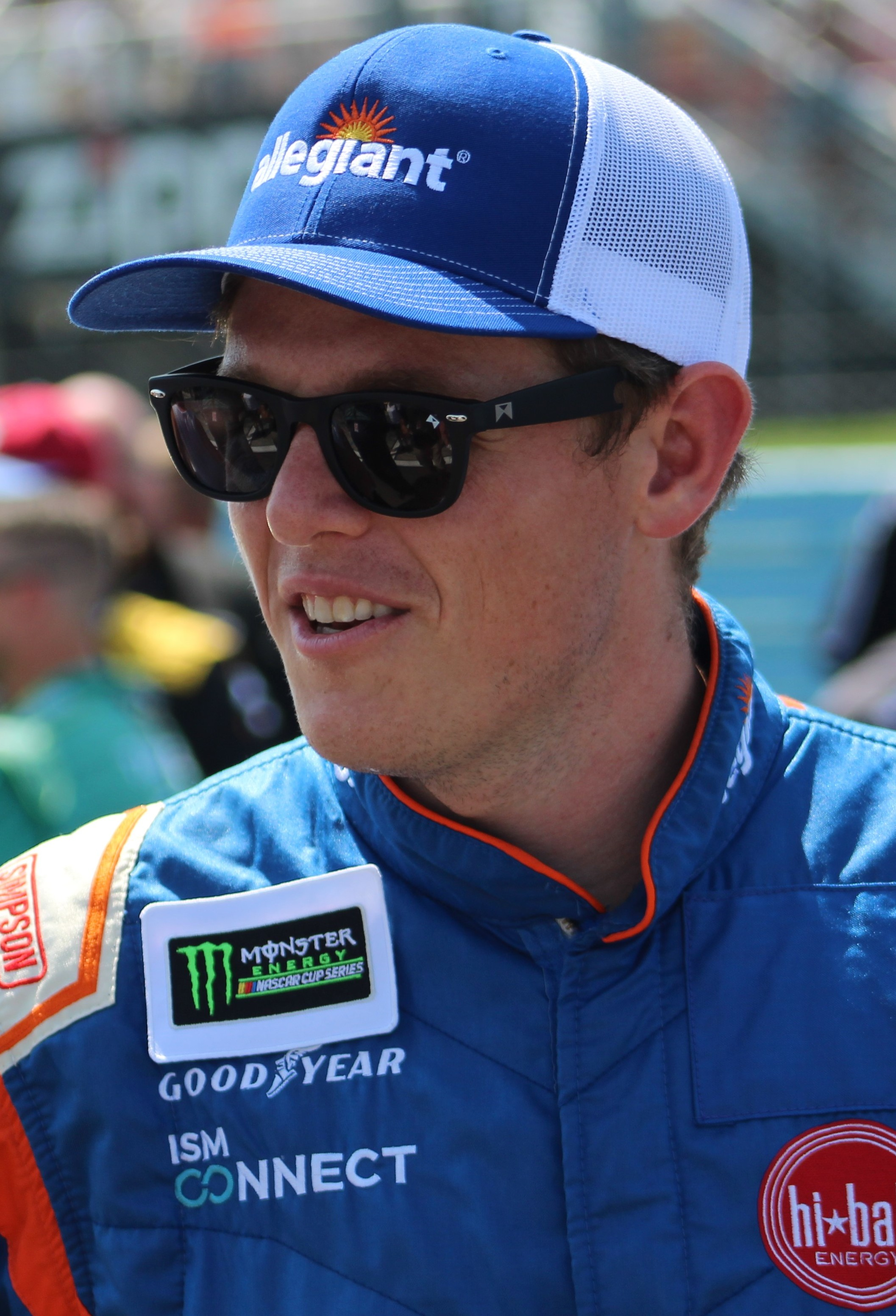
- Gallagher at Watkins Glen International in 2018
- Born: Spencer Moritz Gallagher; November 20, 1989 (age 36); Las Vegas, Nevada, U.S.

NASCAR Cup Series career
- 1 race run over 1 year
- 2018 position: 71st
- Best finish: 71st (2018)
- First race: 2018 Go Bowling at The Glen (Watkins Glen)
Wins	Top tens	Poles
0	0	0

NASCAR O'Reilly Auto Parts Series career
- 59 races run over 3 years
- 2018 position: 18th
- Best finish: 18th (2018)
- First race: 2016 Axalta Faster. Tougher. Brighter. 200 (Phoenix)
- Last race: 2018 Ford EcoBoost 300 (Homestead)
- First win: 2018 Sparks Energy 300 (Talladega)
Wins	Top tens	Poles
1	12	0

NASCAR FedEx Freight Truck Series career
- 60 races run over 6 years
- 2018 position: 106th
- Best finish: 10th (2015)
- First race: 2013 SFP 250 (Kansas)
- Last race: 2018 Fr8Auctions 250 (Talladega)
Wins	Top tens	Poles
0	15	2

NASCAR Canada Series career
- 1 race run over 1 year
- Best finish: 53rd (2015)
- First race: 2015 Pinty's Presents the Clarington 200 (Mosport)
Wins	Top tens	Poles
0	0	0

ARCA Menards Series career
- 54 races run over 5 years
- Best finish: 7th (2012)
- First race: 2011 Ansell Protective Gloves 200 (IRP)
- Last race: 2025 General Tire 150 (Charlotte)
- First win: 2014 ARCA 98.9 (Kansas)
Wins	Top tens	Poles
1	21	0

ARCA Menards Series East career
- 5 races run over 3 years
- Best finish: 39th (2011)
- First race: 2011 New England 125 (New Hampshire)
- Last race: 2025 Rockingham ARCA 125 (Rockingham)
Wins	Top tens	Poles
0	2	0

ARCA Menards Series West career
- 8 races run over 2 years
- Best finish: 18th (2011)
- First race: 2011 3 Amigos Organic Blanco 100 (Phoenix)
- Last race: 2025 Star Nursery 150 (LVMS Bullring)
Wins	Top tens	Poles
0	1	0
- Statistics up to date as of October 11, 2025.

Spencer Moritz Gallagher (born November 20, 1989) is an American professional stock car racing driver. He last competed part-time in the ARCA Menards Series, driving the No. 23 Chevrolet for Sigma Performance Services, part-time in the ARCA Menards Series East, driving the No. 24 Chevrolet for SPS, and part-time in the ARCA Menards Series West, driving the No. 23 Chevrolet for Clark Racing. He is the son of Allegiant Air's CEO, Maurice J. Gallagher Jr. In 2018, Gallagher announced that he would step away from full-time racing at the end of the 2018 season to take on a managerial role at GMS Racing.

== Early career ==
Gallagher was born in Las Vegas, Nevada. According to Gallagher, he and fellow driver Dylan Kwasniewski lived in the same neighborhood growing up, though their first encounter was on the racetrack. He is the son of Allegiant Air CEO Maury Gallagher. Gallagher spent time working for a Silicon Valley software company at the age of nineteen while transitioning to a full-time racing career.

Gallagher began racing at the age of twelve in the Bandolero Bandit Series, then progressing to the Legends Car Series at the Las Vegas Motor Speedway Bullring. Gallagher began to take his racing prospects seriously in 2009 on the recommendation of car owner and former driver T.J. Clark. He won the Silver State Road Racing Championship that year, and the INEX Legends Road Course World Finals in 2010. He also ran six races in the Super Late Model Series with a best finish of fourth. In 2011, Gallagher made six starts in the NASCAR K&N Pro Series West, then made two in the East Series in both 2011 and 2012.

== ARCA ==
=== 2011–2013 ===
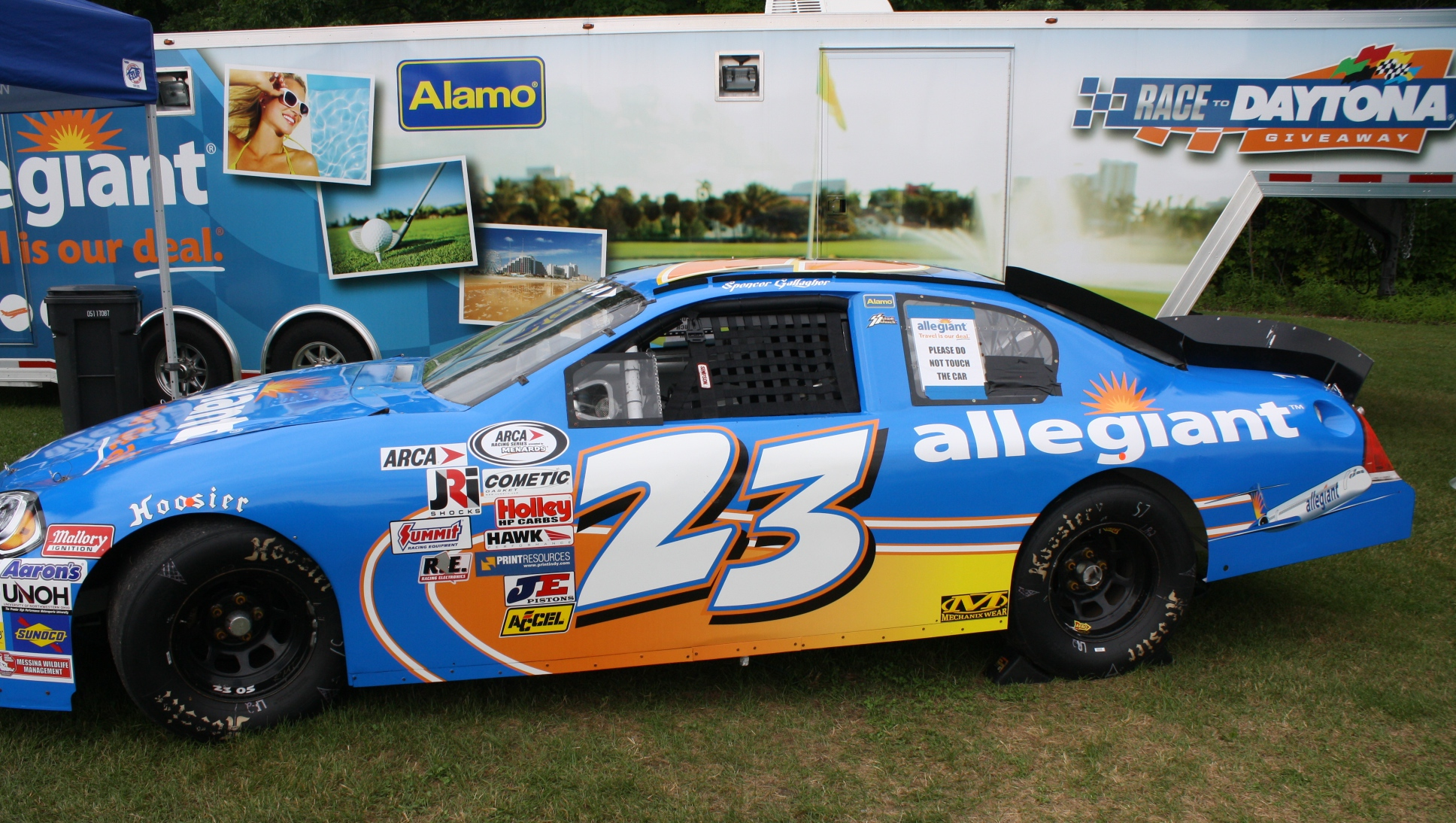
Gallagher's 2013 ARCA car on display at Road America

Gallagher made his debut in the ARCA Racing Series at Indianapolis Raceway Park in 2011, and ran two more races with a best finish of 15th in the No. 05 Allegiant Air Chevrolet. He ran the full nineteen-race schedule in 2012, earning six top-tens and finishing seventh in points. His results improved in 2013, with twelve laps led, five top-five finishes and eight top-ten finishes. He failed to qualify for two races, however, and missed a race after a concussion at Michigan, relegating him to a tenth place points finish. Gallagher also attempted five races, failing to qualify for two, in the Camping World Truck Series, with a best finish of twentieth at Texas.

=== 2014 ===
Gallagher ran the full ARCA schedule in 2014, along with a partial schedule in the No. 23 in the Truck Series, sharing the ride with Max Gresham.

Gallagher was involved in an incident with John Wes Townley at the Iowa truck race in July, leading to a physical confrontation between the two and their respective crew members after the race. Townley and Gallagher, both competitors in the ARCA series as well, felt there was mutual bad blood built up between each other. The two had a friendlier conversation afterwards.

In October 2014, Gallagher got his first win in the twentieth and final race of the ARCA season, the ARCA 98.9 at Kansas Speedway. Gallagher started 32nd, and led the final 32 laps of the race. Later that month, he earned a Truck Series best finish of third at Talladega on a last lap charge through the field.

== NASCAR ==
=== 2015 ===
Gallagher went full-time in GMS Racing's 23 truck for 2015. Gallagher earned a second-place finish at Gateway Motorsports Park in June.

=== 2016 ===
Gallagher started the season with a low note crashing early at Daytona and recovered for a 21st-place finish. Starting at Phoenix, Gallagher ran a limited Xfinity Series schedule using the No. 21, scoring his first top-ten at Daytona. In the Truck Series he scored five straight top-ten finishes until Texas. On June 25, 2016 at Gateway Motorsports Park, Gallagher was involved in a crash with John Wes Townley on lap 155 which led to an awkward fight between the two drivers for several seconds before NASCAR officials separated them. He was fined $12,000 and placed on probation at the end of the year. Gallagher finished second at Talladega behind teammate Grant Enfinger.

=== 2017 ===
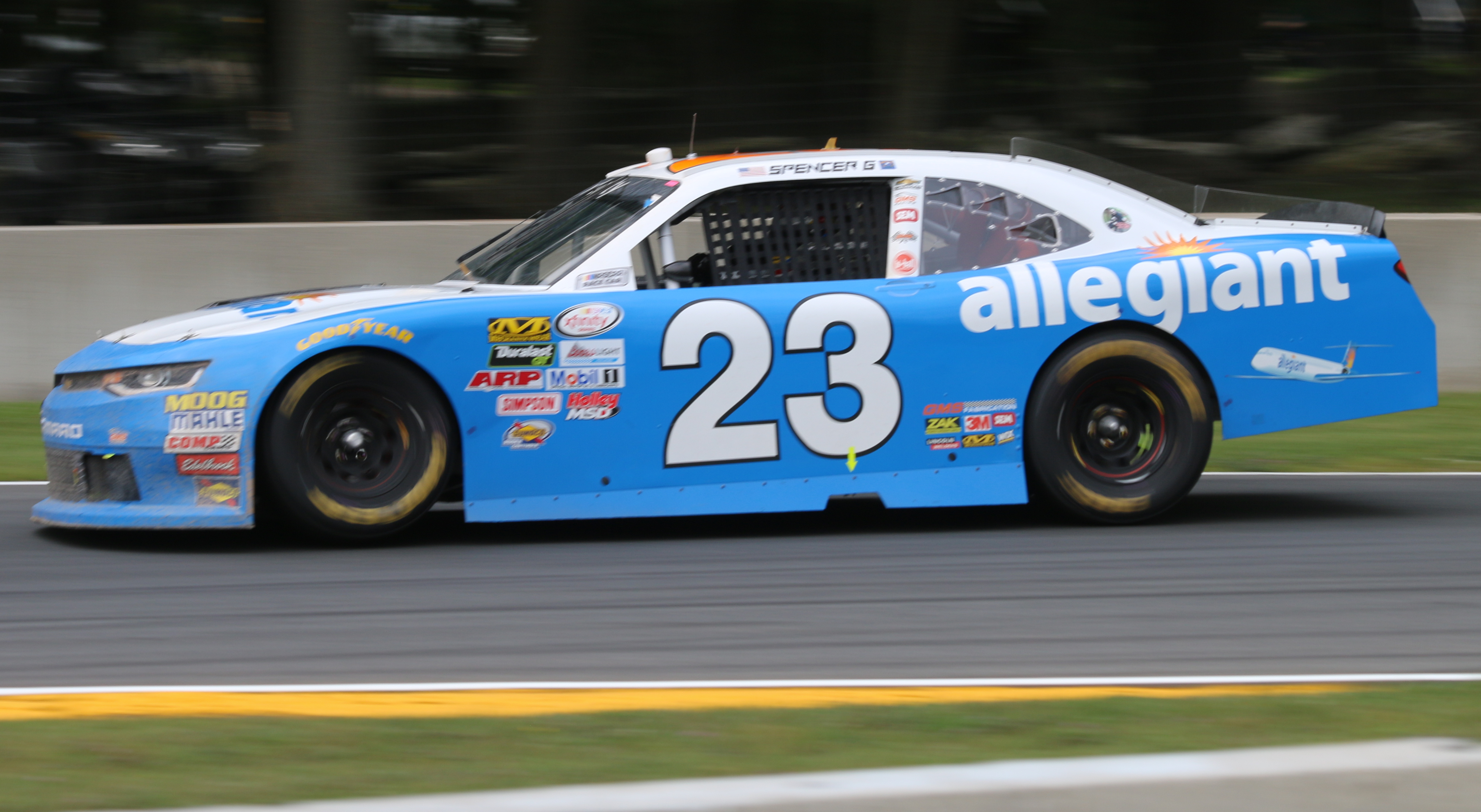
Gallagher racing at Road America in 2017

Gallagher moved up to the Xfinity Series full-time in 2017 with GMS, driving the No. 23 Chevy. During practice for the OneMain Financial 200 at Dover International Speedway, Gallagher spun Joey Gase going into turn three after Gase slowed down. Gase, running for single-car team Jimmy Means Racing, blasted Gallagher in an interview with Fox Sports 1 afterwards, claiming that Gallagher "really, really sucks" for only being one spot ahead of Gase in the standings despite running for a top-tier team. This came after Gallagher told Gase to "get the hell away" in their conversation after the incident.

=== 2018 ===
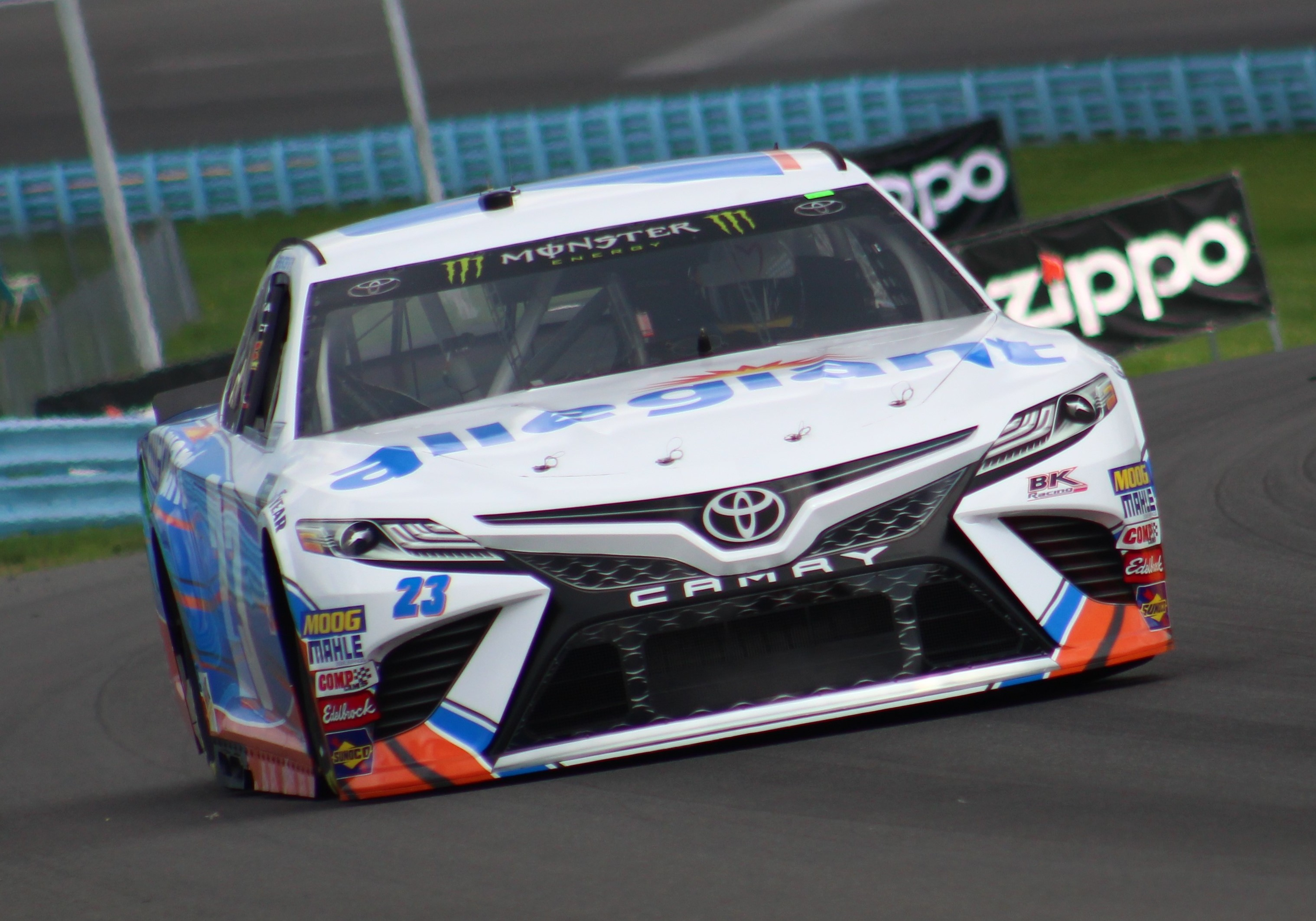
Gallagher's No. 23 car at Watkins Glen International in 2018

In April, Gallagher scored his first career Xfinity win at Talladega; he passed leader Tyler Reddick on the final lap in overtime to record the victory. Four days later, however, he was indefinitely suspended by NASCAR for violating its substance abuse policy. Due to the suspension, Gallagher lost his Dash 4 Cash spot for the next race to Ryan Sieg and lost his playoff eligibility as well. His suspension ended, and he was back in the No. 23 car at Kentucky.

In August, Gallagher joined BK Racing for his Monster Energy NASCAR Cup Series debut at Watkins Glen International. After starting 34th, he finished 35th.

Gallagher was originally supposed to replace Dalton Sargeant at Mosport due to his release, but aggravated his shoulder in a workout session a few days prior and Timothy Peters drove the No. 25 truck instead. While Peters continued piloting the truck for the next few races, Gallagher stepped in for Cody Coughlin at the Talladega Race in the No. 2 truck because of his release. He got caught up in the big one in the middle of the race and finished 25th.

On October 19, 2018, it was announced that Gallagher would be stepping away from NASCAR competition to be focusing on managing his father's racing organization in efforts to bring exploring new opportunities off the track.

== Return to Racing ==
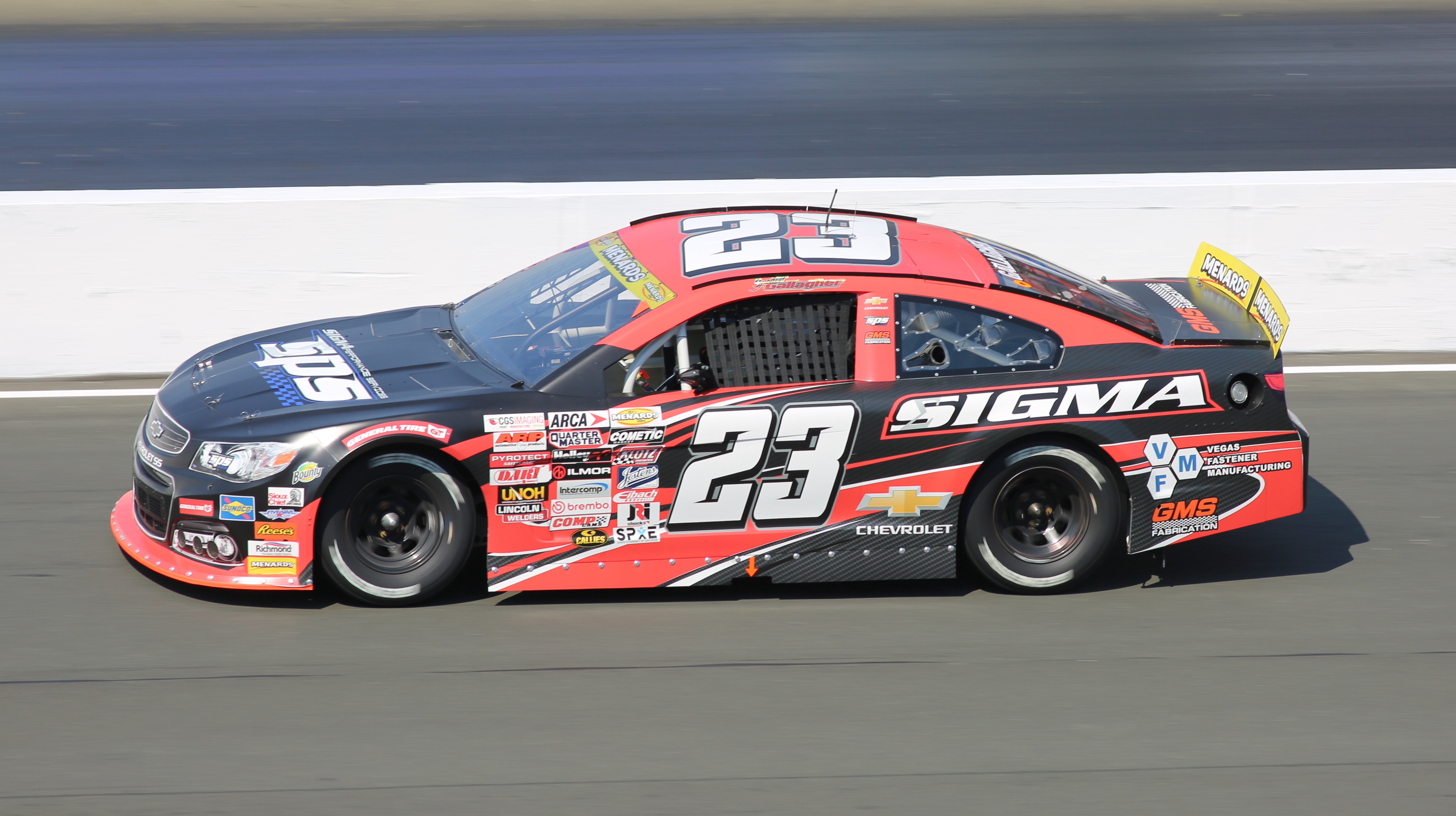
Gallagher's No. 23 car at Sonoma Raceway in 2025

=== 2025 ===
On April 11, 2025, it was announced that Gallagher will make his return to ARCA at the East Series race at Rockingham Speedway, driving the No. 24 Chevrolet for Sigma Performance Services, marking his first start in any racing series since 2018. He will also drive the No. 23 in the main ARCA series at Talladega Superspeedway, Kansas Speedway, and Charlotte Motor Speedway.

== Motorsports career results ==
=== NASCAR ===
(key) (Bold – Pole position awarded by qualifying time. Italics – Pole position earned by points standings or practice time. * – Most laps led.)

==== Monster Energy Cup Series ====
Monster Energy NASCAR Cup Series results
Year	Team	No.	Make	1	2	3	4	5	6	7	8	9	10	11	12	13	14	15	16	17	18	19	20	21	22	23	24	25	26	27	28	29	30	31	32	33	34	35	36	MENCC	Pts	Ref
2018	BK Racing	23	Toyota	DAY	ATL	LVS	PHO	CAL	MAR	TEX	BRI	RCH	TAL	DOV	KAN	CLT	POC	MCH	SON	CHI	DAY	KEN	NHA	POC	GLN; 35	MCH	BRI	DAR	IND	LVS	RCH	CLT	DOV	TAL	KAN	MAR	TEX	PHO	HOM	71st	0^{1}	

==== Xfinity Series ====
NASCAR Xfinity Series results
Year	Team	No.	Make	1	2	3	4	5	6	7	8	9	10	11	12	13	14	15	16	17	18	19	20	21	22	23	24	25	26	27	28	29	30	31	32	33	NXSC	Pts	Ref
2016	GMS Racing	21	Chevy	DAY	ATL	LVS	PHO; 23	CAL; 24	TEX	BRI	RCH; 17	TAL	DOV	CLT; 29	POC	MCH	IOW	DAY; 8	KEN	NHA	IND	IOW	GLN; 22	MOH	BRI	ROA	DAR	RCH	CHI	KEN	DOV	CLT; 24	KAN	TEX	PHO	HOM	105th	0^{1}	
2017	GMS Racing	23	Chevy	DAY; 36	ATL; 28	LVS; 23	PHO; 18	CAL; 19	TEX; 14	BRI; 18	RCH; 10	TAL; 39	CLT; 37	DOV; 31	POC; 18	MCH; 18	IOW; 30	DAY; 24	KEN; 13	NHA; 35	IND; 28	IOW; 37	GLN; 32	MOH; 36	BRI; 23	ROA; 24	DAR; 34	RCH; 22	CHI; 14	KEN; 15	DOV; 24	CLT; 34	KAN; 21	TEX; 15	PHO; 17	HOM; 19	19th	433	
2018	GMS Racing	23	Chevy	DAY; 6	ATL; 14	LVS; 10	PHO; 14	CAL; 11	TEX; 10	BRI; 5	RCH; 17	TAL; 1	DOV	CLT	POC	MCH	IOW	CHI	DAY	KEN; 20	NHA	IOW	GLN	MOH; 8	BRI	ROA	DAR	IND	LVS; 10	RCH; 12	CLT; 19	DOV; 5	KAN; 33	TEX; 9	PHO; 10	HOM; 17	18th	524	

==== Camping World Truck Series ====
NASCAR Camping World Truck Series results
Year	Team	No.	Make	1	2	3	4	5	6	7	8	9	10	11	12	13	14	15	16	17	18	19	20	21	22	23	NCWTC	Pts	Ref
2013	GMS Racing	21	Chevy	DAY	MAR	CAR; DNQ	KAN; 22	CLT	DOV	TEX	KEN	IOW	ELD	POC	MCH	BRI	MSP	IOW	CHI	LVS	TAL	MAR; DNQ	TEX; 20	PHO	HOM; 32		42nd	58	
2014	GMS Racing	23	Chevy	DAY	MAR; 32	KAN; 30	CLT	DOV	TEX	GTW	KEN	IOW; 11	ELD	POC; 15	MCH; 13	BRI	MSP	CHI	NHA	LVS; 13	TAL; 3	MAR	TEX	PHO; 31	HOM; 14		27th	234	
2015	GMS Racing	23	Chevy	DAY; 21	ATL; 13	MAR; 14	KAN; 17	CLT; 10	DOV; 12	TEX; 12	GTW; 2	IOW; 7	KEN; 24	ELD; 17	POC; 14	MCH; 16	BRI; 22	MSP; 8	CHI; 8	NHA; 28	LVS; 15	TAL; 18	MAR; 29	TEX; 12	PHO; 6	HOM; 11	10th	677	
2016	GMS Racing	23	Chevy	DAY; 21	ATL; 10	MAR; 6	KAN; 10	DOV; 6	CLT; 6	TEX; 27	IOW; 13	GTW; 22	KEN; 16	ELD; 29	POC; 15	BRI; 12	MCH; 25	MSP; 22	**CHI**; 7	NHA; 14	LVS; 11	TAL; 2	MAR; 29	**TEX**; 7*	PHO; 32	HOM; 21	12th	402	
2017	GMS Racing	23	Chevy	DAY; 13	ATL	MAR	KAN	CLT	DOV	TEX	GTW	IOW	KEN	ELD	POC	MCH	BRI	MSP	CHI	NHA	LVS	TAL	MAR	TEX	PHO	HOM	87th	0^{1}	
2018	GMS Racing	2	Chevy	DAY	ATL	LVS	MAR	DOV	KAN	CLT	TEX	IOW	GTW	CHI	KEN	ELD	POC	MCH	BRI	MSP	LVS	TAL; 25	MAR	TEX	PHO	HOM	106th	0^{1}	

==== Canadian Tire Series ====
NASCAR Canadian Tire Series results
Year	Team	No.	Make	1	2	3	4	5	6	7	8	9	10	11	NCTSC	Pts	Ref
2015	22 Racing	24	Dodge	MSP	ACD	SSS	ICAR	EIR	SAS	ASE	CTR	RIS	MSP; 22	KWA	53rd	22	

=== ARCA Menards Series ===
(key) (Bold – Pole position awarded by qualifying time. Italics – Pole position earned by points standings or practice time. * – Most laps led.)

ARCA Racing Series results
Year	Team	No.	Make	1	2	3	4	5	6	7	8	9	10	11	12	13	14	15	16	17	18	19	20	21	AMSC	Pts	Ref
2011	Clark Racing	05	Chevy	DAY	TAL	SLM	TOL	NJE	CHI	POC	MCH	WIN	BLN	IOW	IRP; 17	POC	ISF								64th	355	
2011	Chris Diederich Racing	05	Chevy															MAD; 15	DSF	SLM	KAN; 33	TOL			64th	355	
2012	Chris Diederich Racing	23	Chevy	DAY; 29	MOB; 28	SLM; 22	TAL; 19																		7th	3720	
2012	Clark Racing	23	Chevy					TOL; 34	ELK; 14	POC; 13	MCH; 8	WIN; 7	NJE; 14	IOW; 8	CHI; 26			BLN; 15							7th	3720	
2012	GMS Racing	23	Chevy													IRP; 9	POC; 29		ISF; 10	MAD; 15	SLM; 9	DSF; C	KAN; 21		7th	3720	
2013	GMS Racing	23	Chevy	DAY; 21	MOB; 22	SLM; 2	TAL; 27	TOL; 26	ELK; 8	POC; 8	MCH; 17	ROA	WIN	CHI; 13	NJE; 16	POC; 5	BLN; 11	ISF; 2	MAD; 4	DSF	IOW; 14	SLM; 16	KEN; 3	KAN; 7	10th	3790	
2014	GMS Racing	23	Chevy	DAY; DNQ	MOB; 7	SLM; 2	TAL; 5	TOL; 13	NJE; 17	POC; 11	MCH; 5	ELK; 12	WIN	CHI; 6*	IRP	POC	BLN	ISF	MAD	DSF	SLM	KEN	KAN; 1*		12th	2320	
2014	GMS Racing	20	Chevy	DAY; 20																					12th	2320	
2025	Sigma Performance Services	23	Chevy	DAY	PHO	TAL; 23	KAN; 9	CLT; 25	MCH	BLN	ELK	LRP	DOV	IRP	IOW	GLN	ISF	MAD	DSF	BRI	SLM	KAN	TOL		62nd	75	

==== ARCA Menards Series East ====
ARCA Menards Series East results
Year	Team	No.	Make	1	2	3	4	5	6	7	8	9	10	11	12	13	14	AMSEC	Pts	Ref
2011	Clark Racing	23	Chevy	GRE	SBO	RCH	IOW	BGS	JFC	LGY	NHA; 20	COL	GRE	NHA; 22	DOV; DNQ			39th	264	
2012	Clark Racing	23	Chevy	BRI; 17	GRE	RCH	IOW	BGS	JFC	LGY	CNB	COL	IOW					50th	43	
2012	David Hirsch	23	Chevy											NHA; 28	DOV	GRE	CAR	50th	43	
2025	Sigma Performance Services	24	Chevy	FIF	CAR; 10	NSV	FRS	DOV	IRP	IOW	BRI							54th	34	

==== ARCA Menards Series West ====
ARCA Menards Series West results
Year	Team	No.	Make	1	2	3	4	5	6	7	8	9	10	11	12	13	14	AMSWC	Pts	Ref
2011	Clark Racing	23	Chevy	PHO; 27	AAS; DNQ	MMP; 17	IOW; DNQ	LVS; 24	SON; 27	IRW	EVG	PIR; 7	CNS	MRP	SPO	AAS	PHO; 27	18th	792	
2025	Clark Racing	23	Chevy	KER	PHO	TUC	CNS	KER	SON; 18	TRI	PIR	AAS	MAD					39th	54	
2025	Clark Racing	23	Toyota											LVS; 16	PHO			39th	54	

^{*} Season still in progress
^{1} Ineligible for series points

== See also ==
- GMS Racing
