= 2018 Sport Clips Haircuts VFW 200 =

24th race of the 2018 NASCAR Xfinity Series

Race details
- Race 24 of 33 in the 2018 NASCAR Xfinity Series season
- Date: September 1, 2018
- Location: Darlington Raceway in Darlington, South Carolina
- Course: Permanent racing facility
- Course length: 1.366 miles (2.198 km)
- Distance: 147 laps, 200.802 mi (323.106 km)
- Average speed: 111.179 miles per hour (178.925 km/h)

Pole position
Driver	Ross Chastain	Chip Ganassi Racing
- Time: 29.007

Most laps led
Driver	Ross Chastain	Chip Ganassi Racing
- Laps: 90

Winner
No. 22	Brad Keselowski	Team Penske

Television in the United States
- Network: NBCSN
- Announcers: Rick Allen, Jeff Burton, Steve Letarte, and Dale Earnhardt Jr.

Radio in the United States
- Radio: PRN

The 2018 Sport Clips Haircuts VFW 200 was a NASCAR Xfinity Series race held on September 1, 2018 at Darlington Raceway in Darlington, South Carolina. Contested over 147 laps on the 1.366-mile (2.198 km) egg-shaped oval, it was the 24th race of the 2018 NASCAR Xfinity Series season.

== Entry list ==
No.	Driver	Team	Manufacturer
0	Vinnie Miller (R)	JD Motorsports	Chevrolet
00	Cole Custer	Stewart-Haas Racing with Biagi-DenBeste Racing	Ford
01	Landon Cassill	JD Motorsports	Chevrolet
1	Elliott Sadler	JR Motorsports	Chevrolet
2	Matt Tifft	Richard Childress Racing	Chevrolet
3	Ty Dillon (i)	Richard Childress Racing	Chevrolet
4	Garrett Smithley	JD Motorsports	Chevrolet
5	Michael Annett	JR Motorsports	Chevrolet
7	Justin Allgaier	JR Motorsports	Chevrolet
8	Tommy Joe Martins	B. J. McLeod Motorsports	Chevrolet
9	Tyler Reddick (R)	JR Motorsports	Chevrolet
11	Ryan Truex	Kaulig Racing	Chevrolet
15	B. J. McLeod	JD Motorsports	Chevrolet
16	Ryan Reed	Roush Fenway Racing	Ford
18	Denny Hamlin (i)	Joe Gibbs Racing	Toyota
19	Brandon Jones	Joe Gibbs Racing	Toyota
20	Christopher Bell (R)	Joe Gibbs Racing	Toyota
21	Daniel Hemric	Richard Childress Racing	Chevrolet
22	Brad Keselowski (i)	Team Penske	Ford
23	Chase Elliott (i)	GMS Racing	Chevrolet
35	Joey Gase	Go Green Racing	Chevrolet
36	Alex Labbé (R)	DGM Racing	Chevrolet
38	J. J. Yeley	RSS Racing	Chevrolet
39	Ryan Sieg	RSS Racing	Chevrolet
40	Chad Finchum (R)	MBM Motorsports	Chevrolet
42	Ross Chastain	Chip Ganassi Racing	Chevrolet
45	Josh Bilicki (R)	JP Motorsports	Toyota
51	Jeremy Clements	Jeremy Clements Racing	Chevrolet
52	David Starr	Jimmy Means Racing	Chevrolet
55	Bayley Currey (i)	JP Motorsports	Toyota
60	Austin Cindric (R)	Roush Fenway Racing	Ford
66	Carl Long	MBM Motorsports	Dodge
72	Timmy Hill	MBM Motorsports	Toyota
74	Mike Harmon	Mike Harmon Racing	Chevrolet
76	Spencer Boyd (R)	SS-Green Light Racing	Chevrolet
78	Cody Ware (i)	B. J. McLeod Motorsports	Chevrolet
89	Morgan Shepherd	Shepherd Racing Ventures	Chevrolet
90	Brandon Brown	DGM Racing	Chevrolet
93	Jeff Green	RSS Racing	Chevrolet
98	Kevin Harvick (i)	Stewart-Haas Racing with Biagi-DenBeste Racing	Ford

== Practice ==
=== First practice ===
Christopher Bell was the fastest in the first practice session with a time of 29.037 seconds and a speed of 169.356 mph (272.552 km/h).

Pos	No.	Driver	Team	Manufacturer	Time	Speed
1	20	Christopher Bell (R)	Joe Gibbs Racing	Toyota	29.037	169.356
2	42	Ross Chastain	Chip Ganassi Racing	Chevrolet	29.043	169.321
3	00	Cole Custer	Stewart-Haas Racing with Biagi-DenBeste Racing	Ford	29.094	169.025

=== Final practice ===
Elliott Sadler was the fastest in the final practice session with a time of 29.625 seconds and a speed of 165.995 mph (267.143 km/h).

Pos	No.	Driver	Team	Manufacturer	Time	Speed
1	1	Elliott Sadler	JR Motorsports	Chevrolet	29.625	165.995
2	9	Tyler Reddick (R)	JR Motorsports	Chevrolet	29.709	165.526
3	20	Christopher Bell (R)	Joe Gibbs Racing	Toyota	29.787	165.092

== Qualifying ==
Ross Chastain scored the pole for the race with a time of 29.007 and a speed of 169.531 mph (272.834 km/h).

=== Qualifying results ===
Pos	No.	Driver	Team	Manufacturer	Best Speed
1	42	Ross Chastain	Chip Ganassi Racing	Chevrolet	169.531
2	20	Christopher Bell (R)	Joe Gibbs Racing	Toyota	169.263
3	9	Tyler Reddick (R)	JR Motorsports	Chevrolet	169.048
4	21	Daniel Hemric	Richard Childress Racing	Chevrolet	168.839
5	18	Denny Hamlin (i)	Joe Gibbs Racing	Toyota	168.106
6	00	Cole Custer	Stewart-Haas Racing with Biagi-DenBeste Racing	Ford	167.911
7	98	Kevin Harvick (i)	Stewart-Haas Racing with Biagi-DenBeste Racing	Ford	167.762
8	1	Elliott Sadler	JR Motorsports	Chevrolet	167.419
9	22	Brad Keselowski (i)	Team Penske	Ford	166.823
10	7	Justin Allgaier	JR Motorsports	Chevrolet	166.478
11	60	Austin Cindric (R)	Roush Fenway Racing	Ford	167.186
12	3	Ty Dillon (i)	Richard Childress Racing	Chevrolet	166.885
13	11	Ryan Truex	Kaulig Racing	Chevrolet	166.225
14	16	Ryan Reed	Roush Fenway Racing	Ford	166.208
15	5	Michael Annett	JR Motorsports	Chevrolet	166.146
16	2	Matt Tifft	Richard Childress Racing	Chevrolet	165.131
17	51	Jeremy Clements	Jeremy Clements Racing	Chevrolet	164.954
18	36	Alex Labbé (R)	DGM Racing	Chevrolet	165.905
19	35	Joey Gase	Go Green Racing	Chevrolet	164.430
20	4	Garrett Smithley	JD Motorsports	Chevrolet	163.164
21	01	Landon Cassill	JD Motorsports	Chevrolet	165.253
22	38	J. J. Yeley	RSS Racing	Chevrolet	164.534
23	39	Ryan Sieg	RSS Racing	Chevrolet	164.375
24	90	Brandon Brown	DGM Racing	Chevrolet	163.506
25	8	Tommy Joe Martins	B. J. McLeod Motorsports	Chevrolet	162.110
26	0	Vinnie Miller (R)	JD Motorsports	Chevrolet	162.088
27	72	Timmy Hill	MBM Motorsports	Toyota	161.529
28	52	David Starr	Jimmy Means Racing	Chevrolet	160.990
29	15	B. J. McLeod	JD Motorsports	Chevrolet	160.209
30	55	Bayley Currey (i)	JP Motorsports	Toyota	158.996
31	76	Spencer Boyd (R)	SS-Green Light Racing	Chevrolet	158.219
32	78	Cody Ware (i)	B. J. McLeod Motorsports	Chevrolet	157.889
33	89	Morgan Shepherd	Shepherd Racing Ventures	Chevrolet	157.514
34	66	Carl Long	MBM Motorsports	Dodge	156.010
35	74	Mike Harmon	Mike Harmon Racing	Chevrolet	155.227
36	93	Jeff Green	RSS Racing	Chevrolet	154.549
37	40	Chad Finchum (R)	MBM Motorsports	Chevrolet	153.872
38	23	Chase Elliott (i)	GMS Racing	Chevrolet	5.794
39	19	Brandon Jones	Joe Gibbs Racing	Toyota	0.000
40	45	Josh Bilicki (R)	JP Motorsports	Toyota	0.000

== Race ==
=== Stage Results ===
Stage 1

Pos	No	Driver	Team	Manufacturer	Points
1	42	Ross Chastain	Chip Ganassi Racing	Chevrolet	10
2	20	Christopher Bell (R)	Joe Gibbs Racing	Toyota	9
3	98	Kevin Harvick (i)	Stewart-Haas Racing with Biagi-DenBeste	Ford	0
4	9	Tyler Reddick (R)	JR Motorsports	Chevrolet	7
5	7	Justin Allgaier	JR Motorsports	Chevrolet	6
6	21	Daniel Hemric	Richard Childress Racing	Chevrolet	5
7	1	Elliott Sadler	JR Motorsports	Chevrolet	4
8	22	Brad Keselowski (i)	Team Penske	Ford	0
9	18	Denny Hamlin (i)	Joe Gibbs Racing	Toyota	0
10	23	Chase Elliott (i)	GMS Racing	Chevrolet	0

Stage 2

Pos	No	Driver	Team	Manufacturer	Points
1	42	Ross Chastain	Chip Ganassi Racing	Chevrolet	10
2	22	Brad Keselowski (i)	Team Penske	Ford	0
3	98	Kevin Harvick (i)	Stewart-Haas Racing with Biagi-DenBeste	Ford	0
4	7	Justin Allgaier	JR Motorsports	Chevrolet	7
5	9	Tyler Reddick (R)	JR Motorsports	Chevrolet	6
6	18	Denny Hamlin (i)	Joe Gibbs Racing	Toyota	0
7	00	Cole Custer	Stewart-Haas Racing with Biagi-DenBeste	Ford	4
8	1	Elliott Sadler	JR Motorsports	Chevrolet	3
9	23	Chase Elliott (i)	GMS Racing	Chevrolet	0
10	21	Daniel Hemric	Richard Childress Racing	Chevrolet	1

=== Final Stage Results ===
Stage 3

Pos	Grid	No	Driver	Team	Manufacturer	Laps	Points
1	9	22	Brad Keselowski (i)	Team Penske	Ford	147	0
2	6	00	Cole Custer	Stewart-Haas Racing with Biagi-DenBeste	Ford	147	39
3	3	9	Tyler Reddick (R)	JR Motorsports	Chevrolet	147	47
4	5	18	Denny Hamlin (i)	Joe Gibbs Racing	Toyota	147	0
5	8	1	Elliott Sadler	JR Motorsports	Chevrolet	147	39
6	38	23	Chase Elliott (i)	GMS Racing	Chevrolet	147	0
7	10	7	Justin Allgaier	JR Motorsports	Chevrolet	147	43
8	16	2	Matt Tifft	Richard Childress Racing	Chevrolet	147	29
9	12	3	Ty Dillon (i)	Richard Childress Racing	Chevrolet	147	0
10	15	5	Michael Annett	JR Motorsports	Chevrolet	147	27
11	4	21	Daniel Hemric	Richard Childress Racing	Chevrolet	147	32
12	39	19	Brandon Jones	Joe Gibbs Racing	Toyota	147	25
13	14	16	Ryan Reed	Roush Fenway Racing	Ford	147	24
14	21	01	Landon Cassill	JD Motorsports	Chevrolet	147	23
15	13	11	Ryan Truex	Kaulig Racing	Chevrolet	147	22
16	17	51	Jeremy Clements	Jeremy Clements Racing	Chevrolet	147	21
17	23	39	Ryan Sieg	RSS Racing	Chevrolet	147	20
18	24	90	Brandon Brown	DGM Racing	Chevrolet	147	19
19	18	36	Alex Labbé (R)	DGM Racing	Chevrolet	146	18
20	20	4	Garrett Smithley	JD Motorsports	Chevrolet	146	17
21	19	35	Joey Gase	Go Green Racing	Chevrolet	146	16
22	25	8	Tommy Joe Martins	B. J. McLeod Motorsports	Chevrolet	146	15
23	29	15	B. J. McLeod	JD Motorsports	Chevrolet	146	14
24	32	78	Cody Ware (i)	B. J. McLeod Motorsports	Chevrolet	145	0
25	1	42	Ross Chastain	Chip Ganassi Racing	Chevrolet	145	32
26	30	55	Bayley Currey (i)	JP Motorsports	Toyota	135	0
27	35	74	Mike Harmon	Mike Harmon Racing	Chevrolet	131	10
28	40	45	Josh Bilicki (R)	JP Motorsports	Toyota	128	9
29	7	98	Kevin Harvick (i)	Stewart-Haas Racing with Biagi-DenBeste	Ford	111	0
30	22	38	J. J. Yeley	RSS Racing	Chevrolet	99	7
31	31	76	Spencer Boyd (R)	SS-Green Light Racing	Chevrolet	95	6
32	37	40	Chad Finchum (R)	MBM Motorsports	Chevrolet	90	5
33	34	66	Carl Long	MBM Motorsports	Dodge	67	4
34	2	20	Christopher Bell (R)	Joe Gibbs Racing	Toyota	65	12
35	27	72	Timmy Hill	MBM Motorsports	Toyota	54	2
36	28	52	David Starr	Jimmy Means Racing	Chevrolet	40	1
37	26	0	Vinnie Miller (R)	JD Motorsports	Chevrolet	32	1
38	33	89	Morgan Shepherd	Shepherd Racing Ventures	Chevrolet	24	1
39	36	93	Jeff Green	RSS Racing	Chevrolet	13	1
40	11	60	Austin Cindric (R)	Roush Fenway Racing	Ford	2	1

Previous race: 2018 Johnsonville 180	NASCAR Xfinity Series; 2018 season	Next race: 2018 Lilly Diabetes 250
