= 2017 UNOH 175 =

17th race of the 2017 NASCAR Camping World Truck Series

Race details
- Race 17 of 23 of the 2017 NASCAR Camping World Truck Series
- Date: September 23, 2017
- Official name: 20th Annual UNOH 175
- Location: Loudon, New Hampshire, New Hampshire Motor Speedway
- Course: Permanent racing facility
- Course length: 1.058 miles (1.703 km)
- Distance: 175 laps, 185.15 mi (297.97 km)
- Scheduled distance: 175 laps, 185.15 mi (297.97 km)
- Average speed: 104.720 miles per hour (168.531 km/h)

Pole position
Driver	Noah Gragson	Kyle Busch Motorsports
- Time: 28.896

Most laps led
Driver	Christopher Bell	Kyle Busch Motorsports
- Laps: 73

Winner
No. 4	Christopher Bell	Kyle Busch Motorsports

Television in the United States
- Network: Fox Sports 1
- Announcers: Vince Welch, Phil Parsons, Michael Waltrip

Radio in the United States
- Radio: Motor Racing Network

The 2017 UNOH 175 was the 17th stock car race of the 2017 NASCAR Camping World Truck Series, the first race of the 2017 NASCAR Camping World Truck Series playoffs, the first race of the Round of 8, and the 20th and final iteration of the event. The race was held on Saturday, September 23, 2017, in Loudon, New Hampshire at New Hampshire Motor Speedway, a 1.058 miles (1.703 km) permanent oval-shaped racetrack. The race took the scheduled 175 laps to complete. At race's end, Christopher Bell, driving for Kyle Busch Motorsports, would win both stages, and lead 73 laps of the race to earn his 7th career NASCAR Camping World Truck Series win, and his fifth of the season. He would also earn a spot in the next round of the playoffs. To fill out the podium, Ryan Truex of Hattori Racing Enterprises and Todd Gilliland of Kyle Busch Motorsports would finish second and third, respectively.

== Background ==
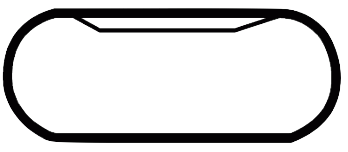
The layout of New Hampshire Motor Speedway, the venue where the race was held.

The race was held at New Hampshire Motor Speedway, which is a 1.058-mile (1.703 km) oval speedway located in Loudon, New Hampshire, which has hosted NASCAR racing annually since 1990, as well as the longest-running motorcycle race in North America, the Loudon Classic. Nicknamed "The Magic Mile", the speedway is often converted into a 1.6-mile (2.6 km) road course, which includes much of the oval.

The track was originally the site of Bryar Motorsports Park before being purchased and redeveloped by Bob Bahre. The track is currently one of eight major NASCAR tracks owned and operated by Speedway Motorsports.

=== Entry list ===
- (R) denotes rookie driver.
- (i) denotes driver who is ineligible for series driver points.

#	Driver	Team	Make
0	Ray Ciccarelli	Jennifer Jo Cobb Racing	Chevrolet
1	Jordan Anderson	TJL Motorsports	Chevrolet
02	Austin Hill	Young's Motorsports	Ford
4	Christopher Bell	Kyle Busch Motorsports	Toyota
6	Norm Benning	Norm Benning Racing	Chevrolet
8	John Hunter Nemechek	NEMCO Motorsports	Chevrolet
10	Jennifer Jo Cobb	Jennifer Jo Cobb Racing	Chevrolet
13	Cody Coughlin (R)	ThorSport Racing	Toyota
15	Gray Gaulding (i)	Premium Motorsports	Chevrolet
16	Ryan Truex	Hattori Racing Enterprises	Toyota
18	Noah Gragson (R)	Kyle Busch Motorsports	Toyota
19	Austin Cindric (R)	Brad Keselowski Racing	Ford
21	Johnny Sauter	GMS Racing	Chevrolet
24	Justin Haley (R)	GMS Racing	Chevrolet
27	Ben Rhodes	ThorSport Racing	Toyota
29	Chase Briscoe (R)	Brad Keselowski Racing	Ford
33	Kaz Grala (R)	GMS Racing	Chevrolet
44	Austin Wayne Self	Martins Motorsports	Chevrolet
45	T. J. Bell	Niece Motorsports	Chevrolet
49	Wendell Chavous (R)	Premium Motorsports	Chevrolet
50	Josh Reaume	Beaver Motorsports	Chevrolet
51	Todd Gilliland	Kyle Busch Motorsports	Toyota
52	Stewart Friesen (R)	Halmar Friesen Racing	Chevrolet
57	Mike Senica	Norm Benning Racing	Chevrolet
63	Camden Murphy	Copp Motorsports	Chevrolet
83	Patrick Emerling	Copp Motorsports	Chevrolet
87	Joe Nemechek	NEMCO Motorsports	Chevrolet
88	Matt Crafton	ThorSport Racing	Toyota
98	Grant Enfinger (R)	ThorSport Racing	Toyota
Official entry list

== Practice ==
=== First practice ===
The first practice session was held on Friday, September 22, at 1:30 PM EST. The session would last for 55 minutes. Noah Gragson of Kyle Busch Motorsports would set the fastest time in the session, with a lap of 28.966 and an average speed of 131.492 mph (211.616 km/h).

Pos.	#	Driver	Team	Make	Time	Speed
1	18	Noah Gragson (R)	Kyle Busch Motorsports	Toyota	28.966	131.492
2	51	Todd Gilliland	Kyle Busch Motorsports	Toyota	29.023	131.234
3	24	Justin Haley (R)	GMS Racing	Chevrolet	29.068	131.031
Full first practice results

=== Final practice ===
The final practice session was held on Friday, September 22, at 3:30 PM EST. The session would last for 55 minutes. Christopher Bell of Kyle Busch Motorsports would set the fastest time in the session, with a lap of 28.664 and an average speed of 132.877 mph (213.845 km/h).

Pos.	#	Driver	Team	Make	Time	Speed
1	4	Christopher Bell	Kyle Busch Motorsports	Toyota	28.664	132.877
2	27	Ben Rhodes	ThorSport Racing	Toyota	28.789	132.301
3	51	Todd Gilliland	Kyle Busch Motorsports	Toyota	28.808	132.213
Full final practice results

== Qualifying ==
Qualifying was held on Saturday, September 23, at 10:05 AM EST. Since New Hampshire Motor Speedway is under 1.5 miles (2.4 km), the qualifying system was a multi-car system that included three rounds. The first round was 15 minutes, where every driver would be able to set a lap within the 15 minutes. Then, the second round would consist of the fastest 24 cars in Round 1, and drivers would have 10 minutes to set a lap. Round 3 consisted of the fastest 12 drivers from Round 2, and the drivers would have 5 minutes to set a time. Whoever was fastest in Round 3 would win the pole.

Noah Gragson of Kyle Busch Motorsports would win the pole after advancing from both preliminary rounds and setting the fastest lap in Round 3, with a time of 28.896 and an average speed of 131.811 mph (212.129 km/h).

=== Full qualifying results ===
Pos.	#	Driver	Team	Make	Time (R1)	Speed (R1)	Time (R2)	Speed (R2)	Time (R3)	Speed (R3)
1	18	Noah Gragson (R)	Kyle Busch Motorsports	Toyota	29.340	129.816	29.262	130.162	28.896	131.811
2	4	Christopher Bell	Kyle Busch Motorsports	Toyota	29.948	127.180	29.115	130.819	28.905	131.770
3	21	Johnny Sauter	GMS Racing	Chevrolet	29.677	128.342	29.119	130.801	29.001	131.333
4	27	Ben Rhodes	ThorSport Racing	Toyota	29.369	129.688	29.096	130.905	29.050	131.112
5	51	Todd Gilliland	Kyle Busch Motorsports	Toyota	29.651	128.454	29.244	130.242	29.077	130.990
6	19	Austin Cindric (R)	Brad Keselowski Racing	Ford	29.574	128.789	29.197	130.452	29.112	130.833
7	16	Ryan Truex	Hattori Racing Enterprises	Toyota	29.451	129.327	29.233	130.291	29.115	130.819
8	98	Grant Enfinger (R)	ThorSport Racing	Toyota	29.669	128.376	29.202	130.429	29.119	130.801
9	29	Chase Briscoe (R)	Brad Keselowski Racing	Ford	29.556	128.867	29.269	130.131	29.174	130.555
10	88	Matt Crafton	ThorSport Racing	Toyota	29.896	127.402	29.209	130.398	29.230	130.304
11	52	Stewart Friesen (R)	Halmar Friesen Racing	Chevrolet	29.646	128.476	29.263	130.158	29.255	130.193
12	33	Kaz Grala (R)	GMS Racing	Chevrolet	30.429	125.170	29.275	130.104	29.278	130.091
Eliminated in Round 2
13	24	Justin Haley (R)	GMS Racing	Chevrolet	29.418	129.472	29.279	130.086	-	-
14	8	John Hunter Nemechek	NEMCO Motorsports	Chevrolet	29.634	128.528	29.283	130.069	-	-
15	02	Austin Hill	Young's Motorsports	Ford	29.831	127.679	29.445	129.353	-	-
16	45	T. J. Bell	Niece Motorsports	Chevrolet	30.796	123.678	29.990	127.002	-	-
17	15	Gray Gaulding (i)	Premium Motorsports	Chevrolet	30.585	124.532	30.297	125.715	-	-
18	87	Joe Nemechek	NEMCO Motorsports	Chevrolet	30.513	124.825	30.419	125.211	-	-
19	44	Austin Wayne Self	Martins Motorsports	Chevrolet	30.565	124.613	30.484	124.944	-	-
20	83	Patrick Emerling	Copp Motorsports	Chevrolet	30.590	124.511	30.488	124.928	-	-
21	50	Josh Reaume	Beaver Motorsports	Chevrolet	31.025	122.766	30.748	123.871	-	-
22	49	Wendell Chavous (R)	Premium Motorsports	Chevrolet	30.990	122.904	31.258	121.850	-	-
23	13	Cody Coughlin (R)	ThorSport Racing	Toyota	30.168	126.253	-	-	-	-
24	1	Jordan Anderson	TJL Motorsports	Chevrolet	31.217	122.010	-	-	-	-
Eliminated in Round 1
25	0	Ray Ciccarelli	Jennifer Jo Cobb Racing	Chevrolet	32.126	118.588	-	-	-	-
26	63	Camden Murphy	Copp Motorsports	Chevrolet	32.253	118.091	-	-	-	-
27	6	Norm Benning	Norm Benning Racing	Chevrolet	32.598	116.842	-	-	-	-
Qualified by owner's points
28	57	Mike Senica	Norm Benning Racing	Chevrolet	37.796	100.773	-	-	-	-
29	10	Jennifer Jo Cobb	Jennifer Jo Cobb Racing	Chevrolet	-	-	-	-	-	-
Official qualifying results
Official starting lineup

== Race results ==
Stage 1 Laps: 55

Pos.	#	Driver	Team	Make	Pts
1	4	Christopher Bell	Kyle Busch Motorsports	Toyota	10
2	27	Ben Rhodes	ThorSport Racing	Toyota	9
3	18	Noah Gragson (R)	Kyle Busch Motorsports	Toyota	8
4	19	Austin Cindric (R)	Brad Keselowski Racing	Ford	7
5	21	Johnny Sauter	GMS Racing	Chevrolet	6
6	88	Matt Crafton	ThorSport Racing	Toyota	5
7	16	Ryan Truex	Hattori Racing Enterprises	Toyota	4
8	51	Todd Gilliland	Kyle Busch Motorsports	Toyota	3
9	98	Grant Enfinger (R)	ThorSport Racing	Toyota	2
10	52	Stewart Friesen (R)	Halmar Friesen Racing	Chevrolet	1

Stage 2 Laps: 55

Pos.	#	Driver	Team	Make	Pts
1	4	Christopher Bell	Kyle Busch Motorsports	Toyota	10
2	88	Matt Crafton	ThorSport Racing	Toyota	9
3	16	Ryan Truex	Hattori Racing Enterprises	Toyota	8
4	98	Grant Enfinger (R)	ThorSport Racing	Toyota	7
5	33	Kaz Grala (R)	GMS Racing	Chevrolet	6
6	52	Stewart Friesen (R)	Halmar Friesen Racing	Chevrolet	5
7	27	Ben Rhodes	ThorSport Racing	Toyota	4
8	51	Todd Gilliland	Kyle Busch Motorsports	Toyota	3
9	24	Justin Haley (R)	GMS Racing	Chevrolet	2
10	21	Johnny Sauter	GMS Racing	Chevrolet	1

Stage 3 Laps: 65

Fin	#	Driver	Team	Make	Laps	Led	Status	Pts
1	4	Christopher Bell	Kyle Busch Motorsports	Toyota	175	73	Running	60
2	16	Ryan Truex	Hattori Racing Enterprises	Toyota	175	28	Running	47
3	51	Todd Gilliland	Kyle Busch Motorsports	Toyota	175	0	Running	40
4	98	Grant Enfinger (R)	ThorSport Racing	Toyota	175	0	Running	42
5	52	Stewart Friesen (R)	Halmar Friesen Racing	Chevrolet	175	0	Running	38
6	88	Matt Crafton	ThorSport Racing	Toyota	175	17	Running	45
7	27	Ben Rhodes	ThorSport Racing	Toyota	175	17	Running	43
8	19	Austin Cindric (R)	Brad Keselowski Racing	Ford	175	0	Running	36
9	21	Johnny Sauter	GMS Racing	Chevrolet	175	0	Running	35
10	33	Kaz Grala (R)	GMS Racing	Chevrolet	175	0	Running	33
11	29	Chase Briscoe (R)	Brad Keselowski Racing	Ford	175	0	Running	26
12	13	Cody Coughlin (R)	ThorSport Racing	Toyota	175	0	Running	25
13	24	Justin Haley (R)	GMS Racing	Chevrolet	175	0	Running	26
14	44	Austin Wayne Self	Martins Motorsports	Chevrolet	174	0	Running	23
15	18	Noah Gragson (R)	Kyle Busch Motorsports	Toyota	174	40	Running	30
16	45	T. J. Bell	Niece Motorsports	Chevrolet	173	0	Running	21
17	50	Josh Reaume	Beaver Motorsports	Chevrolet	169	0	Running	20
18	49	Wendell Chavous (R)	Premium Motorsports	Chevrolet	168	0	Running	19
19	6	Norm Benning	Norm Benning Racing	Chevrolet	144	0	Brakes	18
20	8	John Hunter Nemechek	NEMCO Motorsports	Chevrolet	139	0	Running	17
21	1	Jordan Anderson	TJL Motorsports	Chevrolet	126	0	Electrical	16
22	02	Austin Hill	Young's Motorsports	Ford	125	0	Brakes	15
23	83	Patrick Emerling	Copp Motorsports	Chevrolet	116	0	Engine	14
24	10	Jennifer Jo Cobb	Jennifer Jo Cobb Racing	Chevrolet	27	0	Electrical	13
25	15	Gray Gaulding (i)	Premium Motorsports	Chevrolet	25	0	Brakes	0
26	87	Joe Nemechek	NEMCO Motorsports	Chevrolet	11	0	Vibration	11
27	63	Camden Murphy	Copp Motorsports	Chevrolet	8	0	Brakes	10
28	57	Mike Senica	Norm Benning Racing	Chevrolet	3	0	Rear Gear	9
29	0	Ray Ciccarelli	Jennifer Jo Cobb Racing	Chevrolet	0	0	Fuel Pump	8
Official race results

== Standings after the race ==
Drivers' Championship standings

Pos	Driver	Points
1	Christopher Bell	2,100
2	Johnny Sauter	2,060 (-40)
3	Matt Crafton	2,059 (–41)
4	Ben Rhodes	2,050 (–50)
5	Austin Cindric	2,043 (–57)
6	Kaz Grala	2,038 (–62)
7	Chase Briscoe	2,035 (–65)
8	John Hunter Nemechek	2,031 (–69)
Official driver's standings

- Note: Only the first 8 positions are included for the driver standings.

Previous race: 2017 TheHouse.com 225	NASCAR Camping World Truck Series; 2017 season	Next race: 2017 Las Vegas 350
