= 2017 Las Vegas 350 =

18th race of the 2017 NASCAR Camping World Truck Series

Race details
- Race 18 of 23 of the 2017 NASCAR Camping World Truck Series
- Date: September 30, 2017
- Official name: 21st Annual Las Vegas 350
- Location: North Las Vegas, Nevada, Las Vegas Motor Speedway
- Course: Permanent racing facility
- Course length: 1.5 miles (2.4 km)
- Distance: 146 laps, 219 mi (352.446 km)
- Scheduled distance: 146 laps, 219 mi (352.446 km)
- Average speed: 116.644 miles per hour (187.720 km/h)

Pole position
Driver	Ryan Truex	Hattori Racing Enterprises
- Time: 30.475

Most laps led
Driver	Christopher Bell	Kyle Busch Motorsports
- Laps: 64

Winner
No. 27	Ben Rhodes	ThorSport Racing

Television in the United States
- Network: Fox Sports 1
- Announcers: Vince Welch, Phil Parsons, Michael Waltrip

Radio in the United States
- Radio: Motor Racing Network

The 2017 Las Vegas 350 was the 18th stock car race of the 2017 NASCAR Camping World Truck Series, the second race of the 2017 NASCAR Camping World Truck Series playoffs, the second race of the Round of 8, and the 21st iteration of the event. The race was held on Saturday, September 30, 2017, in North Las Vegas, Nevada at Las Vegas Motor Speedway, a 1.5 miles (2.4 km) permanent D-shaped racetrack. The race took the scheduled 146 laps to complete. At race's end, Ben Rhodes, driving for ThorSport Racing, held off a charging Christopher Bell for his first career NASCAR Camping World Truck Series win. He would also earn a spot in the next round of the playoffs. To fill out the podium, Chase Briscoe of Brad Keselowski Racing would finish third, respectively.

== Background ==
The layout of Las Vegas Motor Speedway, the venue where the race was held.

The race was held at Las Vegas Motor Speedway, which is a 1,200-acre (490 ha) complex of multiple tracks for motorsports racing. The complex is owned by Speedway Motorsports, Inc., which is headquartered in Charlotte, North Carolina. It is located in Clark County, Nevada in Las Vegas, Nevada about 15 miles northeast of the Las Vegas Strip.

=== Entry list ===
- (R) denotes rookie driver.

#	Driver	Team	Make	Sponsor
0	Matt Mills	Jennifer Jo Cobb Racing	Chevrolet	Driven2Honor.org
1	Jordan Anderson	TJL Motorsports	Chevrolet	Lucas Oil, Bommarito Automotive Group
02	Timothy Peters	Young's Motorsports	Chevrolet	Henry County, Autos by Nelson
4	Christopher Bell	Kyle Busch Motorsports	Toyota	DC Solar
6	Norm Benning	Norm Benning Racing	Chevrolet	Norm Benning Racing
8	John Hunter Nemechek	NEMCO Motorsports	Chevrolet	Berry's Manufacturing
10	Jennifer Jo Cobb	Jennifer Jo Cobb Racing	Chevrolet	Waldo's Painting Company
13	Cody Coughlin (R)	ThorSport Racing	Toyota	Ride TV, Jegs
16	Ryan Truex	Hattori Racing Enterprises	Toyota	Martin Truex Jr. Foundation
18	Noah Gragson (R)	Kyle Busch Motorsports	Toyota	Switch
19	Austin Cindric (R)	Brad Keselowski Racing	Ford	LTi Printing
21	Johnny Sauter	GMS Racing	Chevrolet	Allegiant Air
24	Justin Haley (R)	GMS Racing	Chevrolet	MyWhy
27	Ben Rhodes	ThorSport Racing	Toyota	Safelite
29	Chase Briscoe (R)	Brad Keselowski Racing	Ford	Cooper Standard
33	Kaz Grala (R)	GMS Racing	Chevrolet	Kiklos
38	T. J. Bell	Niece Motorsports	Chevrolet	Niece Equipment
44	Austin Wayne Self	Martins Motorsports	Chevrolet	AM Technical Solutions
45	Travis Pastrana	Niece Motorsports	Chevrolet	Wienerschnitzel
49	Wendell Chavous (R)	Premium Motorsports	Chevrolet	Testoril
50	Josh Reaume	Beaver Motorsports	Chevrolet	Java Chews
51	Myatt Snider	Kyle Busch Motorsports	Toyota	Louisiana Hot Sauce
52	Stewart Friesen (R)	Halmar Friesen Racing	Chevrolet	Halmar International "We Build America"
57	Mike Senica	Norm Benning Racing	Chevrolet	Norm Benning Racing
63	Todd Peck	Copp Motorsports	Chevrolet	Sahlen's, FR8 Auctions
83	Camden Murphy	Copp Motorsports	Chevrolet	BYB Extreme, TDS
87	Joe Nemechek	NEMCO Motorsports	Chevrolet	D. A. B. Constructors
88	Matt Crafton	ThorSport Racing	Toyota	Rip It, Menards
98	Grant Enfinger (R)	ThorSport Racing	Toyota	Jive Communications
Official entry list

== Practice ==
=== First practice ===
The first practice session was held on Saturday, September 30, at 8:30 AM PST. The session would last for 55 minutes. Johnny Sauter of GMS Racing would set the fastest time in the session, with a lap of 30.089 and an average speed of 179.468 mph (288.826 km/h).

Pos.	#	Driver	Team	Make	Time	Speed
1	21	Johnny Sauter	GMS Racing	Chevrolet	30.089	179.468
2	16	Ryan Truex	Hattori Racing Enterprises	Toyota	30.232	178.619
3	88	Matt Crafton	ThorSport Racing	Toyota	30.237	178.589
Full first practice results

=== Final practice ===
The final practice session was held on Saturday, September 30, at 10:00 AM CST. The session would last for 55 minutes. Kaz Grala of GMS Racing would set the fastest time in the session, with a lap of 30.160 and an average speed of 179.045 mph (288.145 km/h).

Pos.	#	Driver	Team	Make	Time	Speed
1	33	Kaz Grala (R)	GMS Racing	Chevrolet	30.160	179.045
2	18	Noah Gragson (R)	Kyle Busch Motorsports	Toyota	30.161	179.039
3	4	Christopher Bell	Kyle Busch Motorsports	Toyota	30.196	178.832
Full final practice results

== Qualifying ==
Qualifying was held on Saturday, September 23, at 3:10 PM CST. Since Las Vegas Motor Speedway is at least 1.5 miles (2.4 km), the qualifying system was a single car, single lap, two round system where in the first round, everyone would set a time to determine positions 13–32. Then, the fastest 12 qualifiers would move on to the second round to determine positions 1–12.

Ryan Truex of Hattori Racing Enterprises would win the pole, setting a lap of 30.475 and an average speed of 177.194 mph (285.166 km/h).

=== Full qualifying results ===
Pos.	#	Driver	Team	Make	Time (R1)	Speed (R1)	Time (R2)	Speed (R2)
1	16	Ryan Truex	Hattori Racing Enterprises	Toyota	30.525	176.904	30.475	177.194
2	21	Johnny Sauter	GMS Racing	Chevrolet	30.674	176.045	30.523	176.916
3	29	Chase Briscoe (R)	Brad Keselowski Racing	Ford	30.554	176.736	30.529	176.881
4	4	Christopher Bell	Kyle Busch Motorsports	Toyota	30.615	176.384	30.558	176.713
5	88	Matt Crafton	ThorSport Racing	Toyota	30.612	176.401	30.568	176.655
6	27	Ben Rhodes	ThorSport Racing	Toyota	30.673	176.051	30.601	176.465
7	19	Austin Cindric (R)	Brad Keselowski Racing	Ford	30.736	175.690	30.621	176.350
8	24	Justin Haley (R)	GMS Racing	Chevrolet	30.600	176.471	30.648	176.194
9	51	Myatt Snider	Kyle Busch Motorsports	Toyota	30.757	175.570	30.688	175.965
10	98	Grant Enfinger (R)	ThorSport Racing	Toyota	30.610	176.413	30.688	175.965
11	52	Stewart Friesen (R)	Halmar Friesen Racing	Chevrolet	30.662	176.114	30.706	175.861
12	13	Cody Coughlin (R)	ThorSport Racing	Toyota	30.658	176.137	30.762	175.541
Eliminated in Round 1
13	18	Noah Gragson (R)	Kyle Busch Motorsports	Toyota	30.781	175.433	-	-
14	33	Kaz Grala (R)	GMS Racing	Chevrolet	30.911	174.695	-	-
15	8	John Hunter Nemechek	NEMCO Motorsports	Chevrolet	31.051	173.907	-	-
16	49	Wendell Chavous (R)	Premium Motorsports	Chevrolet	31.294	172.557	-	-
17	44	Austin Wayne Self	Martins Motorsports	Chevrolet	31.308	172.480	-	-
18	45	Travis Pastrana	Niece Motorsports	Chevrolet	31.648	170.627	-	-
19	0	Matt Mills	Jennifer Jo Cobb Racing	Chevrolet	31.706	170.315	-	-
20	02	Timothy Peters	Young's Motorsports	Chevrolet	31.714	170.272	-	-
21	1	Jordan Anderson	TJL Motorsports	Chevrolet	31.798	169.822	-	-
22	83	Camden Murphy	Copp Motorsports	Chevrolet	31.883	169.369	-	-
23	50	Josh Reaume	Beaver Motorsports	Chevrolet	31.994	168.782	-	-
24	87	Joe Nemechek	NEMCO Motorsports	Chevrolet	32.032	168.581	-	-
25	38	T. J. Bell	Niece Motorsports	Chevrolet	32.406	166.636	-	-
26	6	Norm Benning	Norm Benning Racing	Chevrolet	33.308	162.123	-	-
27	10	Jennifer Jo Cobb	Jennifer Jo Cobb Racing	Chevrolet	33.546	160.973	-	-
Qualified by owner's points
28	57	Mike Senica	Norm Benning Racing	Chevrolet	39.524	136.626	-	-
29	63	Todd Peck	Copp Motorsports	Chevrolet	-	-	-	-
Official qualifying results
Official starting lineup

== Race results ==
Stage 1 Laps: 35

Pos.	#	Driver	Team	Make	Pts
1	29	Chase Briscoe (R)	Brad Keselowski Racing	Ford	10
2	21	Johnny Sauter	GMS Racing	Chevrolet	9
3	4	Christopher Bell	Kyle Busch Motorsports	Chevrolet	8
4	16	Ryan Truex	Hattori Racing Enterprises	Toyota	7
5	88	Matt Crafton	ThorSport Racing	Toyota	6
6	27	Ben Rhodes	ThorSport Racing	Toyota	5
7	33	Kaz Grala (R)	GMS Racing	Chevrolet	4
8	19	Austin Cindric (R)	Brad Keselowski Racing	Ford	3
9	52	Stewart Friesen (R)	Halmar Friesen Racing	Chevrolet	2
10	18	Noah Gragson (R)	Kyle Busch Motorsports	Toyota	1

Stage 2 Laps: 35

Pos.	#	Driver	Team	Make	Pts
1	27	Ben Rhodes	ThorSport Racing	Toyota	10
2	4	Christopher Bell	Kyle Busch Motorsports	Toyota	9
3	8	John Hunter Nemechek	NEMCO Motorsports	Chevrolet	8
4	16	Ryan Truex	Hattori Racing Enterprises	Toyota	7
5	88	Matt Crafton	ThorSport Racing	Toyota	6
6	29	Chase Briscoe (R)	Brad Keselowski Racing	Ford	5
7	18	Noah Gragson (R)	Kyle Busch Motorsports	Toyota	4
8	19	Austin Cindric (R)	Brad Keselowski Racing	Ford	3
9	21	Johnny Sauter	GMS Racing	Chevrolet	2
10	98	Grant Enfinger (R)	ThorSport Racing	Toyota	1

Stage 3 Laps: 76

Fin	St	#	Driver	Team	Make	Laps	Led	Status	Pts
1	6	27	Ben Rhodes	ThorSport Racing	Toyota	146	20	Running	55
2	4	4	Christopher Bell	Kyle Busch Motorsports	Toyota	146	64	Running	52
3	3	29	Chase Briscoe (R)	Brad Keselowski Racing	Ford	146	40	Running	49
4	7	19	Austin Cindric (R)	Brad Keselowski Racing	Ford	146	1	Running	39
5	14	33	Kaz Grala (R)	GMS Racing	Chevrolet	146	0	Running	36
6	12	13	Cody Coughlin (R)	ThorSport Racing	Toyota	146	0	Running	31
7	5	88	Matt Crafton	ThorSport Racing	Toyota	146	0	Running	42
8	15	8	John Hunter Nemechek	NEMCO Motorsports	Chevrolet	146	8	Running	37
9	10	98	Grant Enfinger (R)	ThorSport Racing	Toyota	146	0	Running	29
10	2	21	Johnny Sauter	GMS Racing	Chevrolet	145	0	Running	38
11	20	02	Timothy Peters	Young's Motorsports	Chevrolet	145	0	Running	26
12	1	16	Ryan Truex	Hattori Racing Enterprises	Toyota	145	1	Running	39
13	13	18	Noah Gragson (R)	Kyle Busch Motorsports	Toyota	144	12	Running	29
14	16	49	Wendell Chavous (R)	Premium Motorsports	Chevrolet	144	0	Running	23
15	21	1	Jordan Anderson	TJL Motorsports	Chevrolet	143	0	Running	22
16	23	50	Josh Reaume	Beaver Motorsports	Chevrolet	142	0	Running	21
17	22	83	Camden Murphy	Copp Motorsports	Chevrolet	141	0	Running	20
18	27	10	Jennifer Jo Cobb	Jennifer Jo Cobb Racing	Chevrolet	138	0	Running	19
19	26	6	Norm Benning	Norm Benning Racing	Chevrolet	129	0	Running	18
20	17	44	Austin Wayne Self	Martins Motorsports	Chevrolet	128	0	Accident	17
21	8	24	Justin Haley (R)	GMS Racing	Chevrolet	117	0	Engine	16
22	18	45	Travis Pastrana	Niece Motorsports	Chevrolet	112	0	Accident	15
23	11	52	Stewart Friesen (R)	Halmar Friesen Racing	Chevrolet	41	0	Accident	16
24	25	38	T. J. Bell	Niece Motorsports	Chevrolet	27	0	Overheating	13
25	19	0	Matt Mills	Jennifer Jo Cobb Racing	Chevrolet	11	0	Engine	12
26	24	87	Joe Nemechek	NEMCO Motorsports	Chevrolet	9	0	Electrical	11
27	28	57	Mike Senica	Norm Benning Racing	Chevrolet	4	0	Transmission	10
28	9	51	Myatt Snider	Kyle Busch Motorsports	Toyota	0	0	Accident	9
29	29	63	Todd Peck	Copp Motorsports	Chevrolet	0	0	Engine	8
Official race results

== Standings after the race ==
Drivers' Championship standings

Pos	Driver	Points
1	Christopher Bell	2,152
2	Ben Rhodes	2,105 (-47)
3	Matt Crafton	2,101 (–51)
4	Johnny Sauter	2,098 (–54)
5	Chase Briscoe	2,084 (–68)
6	Austin Cindric	2,082 (–70)
7	Kaz Grala	2,074 (–78)
8	John Hunter Nemechek	2,068 (–84)
Official driver's standings

- Note: Only the first 8 positions are included for the driver standings.

Previous race: 2017 UNOH 175	NASCAR Camping World Truck Series; 2017 season	Next race: 2017 Fred's 250
