= Tommy Regan =

American racing driver (born 1977)

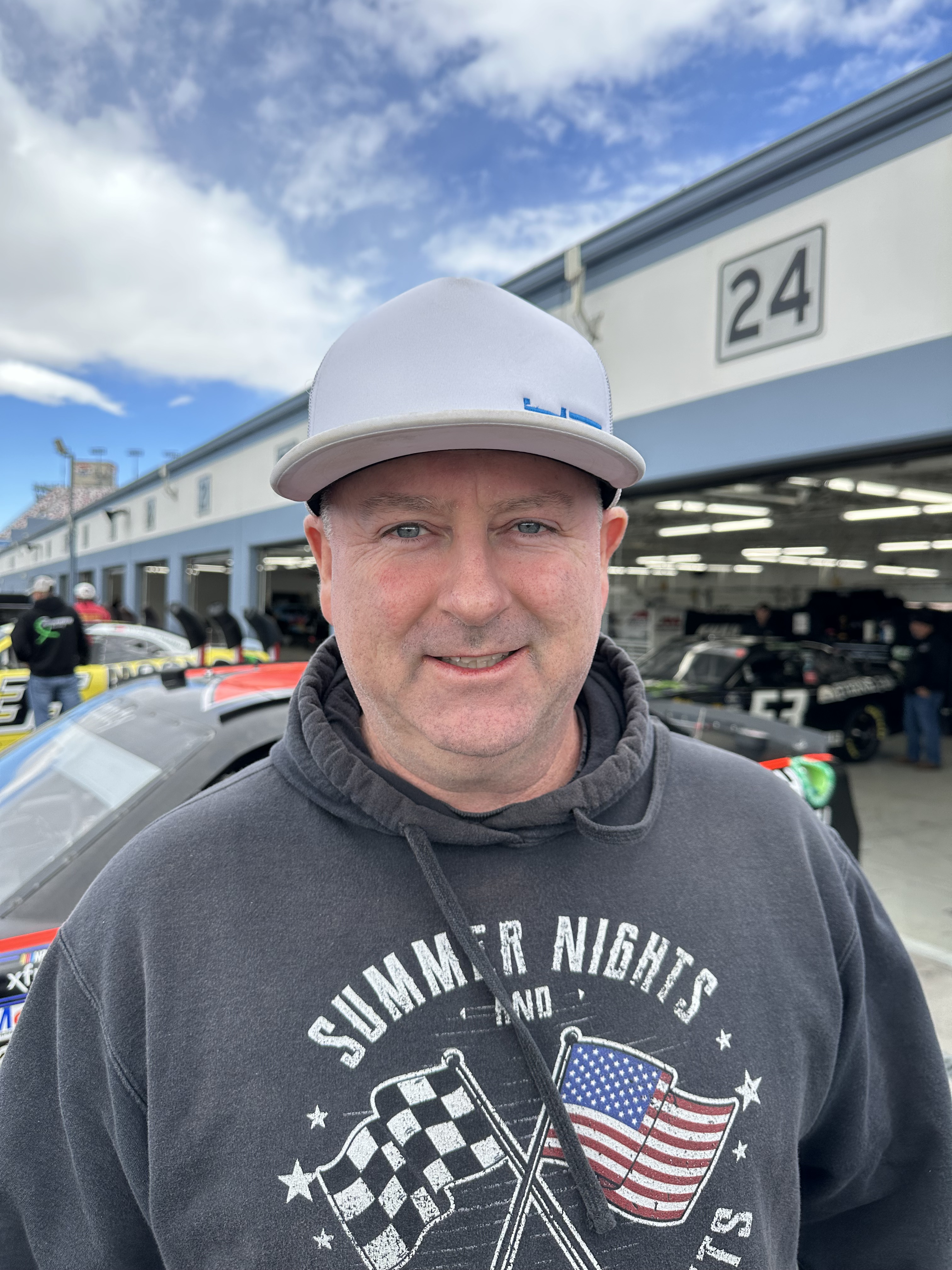
- Regan in 2024
- Born: Thomas Regan; September 16, 1977 (age 49); Tracy, California, U.S.

NASCAR Cup Series career
- 1 race run over 1 year
- 2017 position: 47th
- Best finish: 47th (2017)
- First race: 2017 Toyota/Save Mart 350 (Sonoma)
| Wins | Top tens | Poles |
|---|---|---|
| 0 | 0 | 0 |

NASCAR FedEx Freight Truck Series career
- 9 races run over 4 years
- 2018 position: 82nd
- Best finish: 49th (2015)
- First race: 2014 American Ethanol 200 (Iowa)
- Last race: 2018 Stratosphere 200 (Las Vegas)
| Wins | Top tens | Poles |
|---|---|---|
| 0 | 0 | 0 |
- Statistics up to date as of January 2, 2019.

Thomas Regan (born September 16, 1977) is an American professional stock car racing driver. He last competed part-time in the NASCAR Camping World Truck Series, driving the No. 1 Chevrolet Silverado for TJL Motorsports in 2018.

== Racing career ==
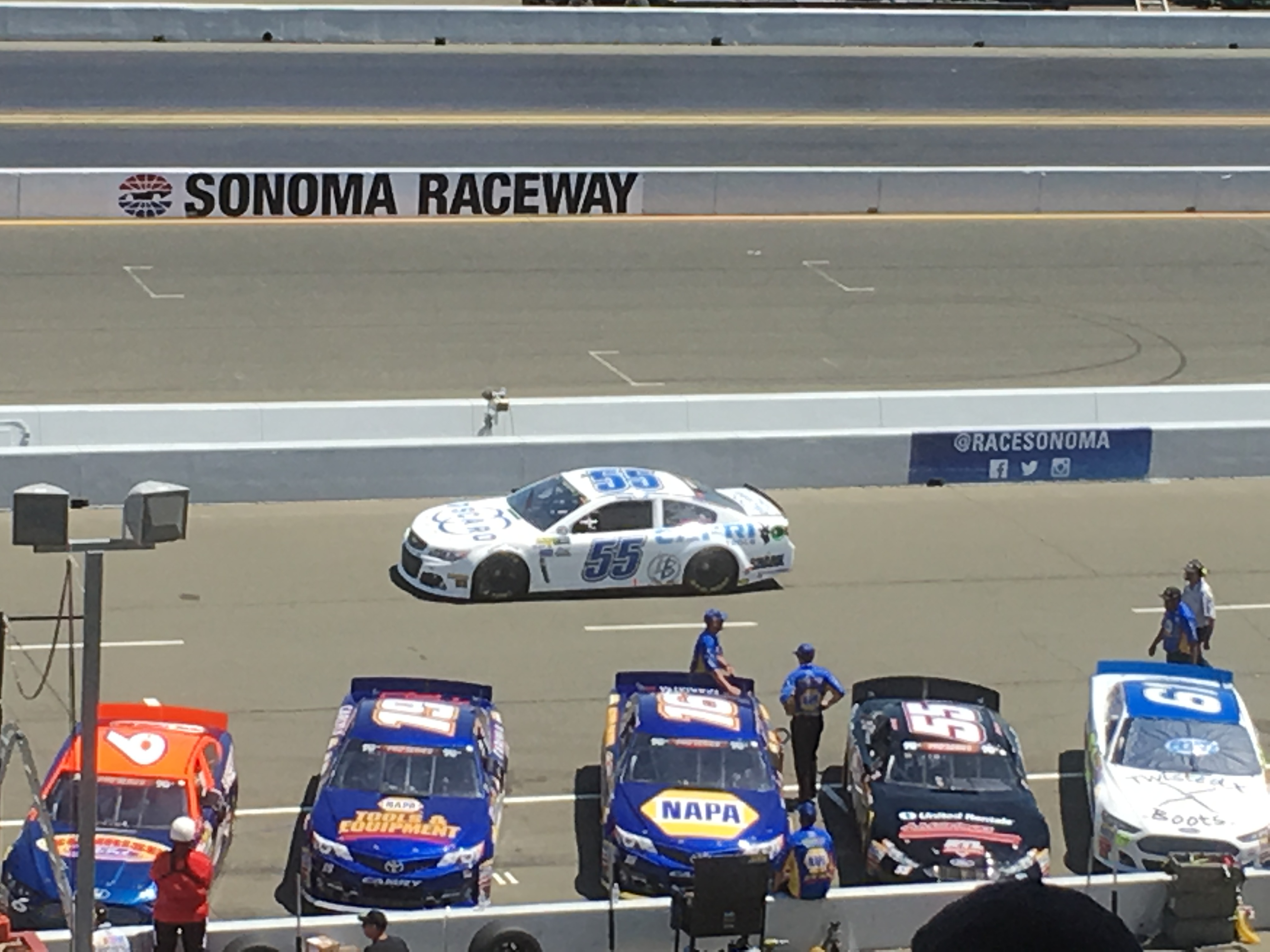
Regan during qualifying for the 2017 Toyota/Save Mart 350.

Regan grew up in Southern California, and followed the family tradition of racing Sportsman cars on short tracks in the area.

Receiving funding from Ultra Lube, Regan ran four races in the NASCAR K&N Pro Series West in 2012, three for Mike Holleran and one for Marv Brown. In his first race, at Stockton 99 Speedway, engine problems hampered his run. He recorded a best finish of nineteenth at All American Speedway.

Regan's Camping World Truck Series debut came in 2014 at Iowa Speedway for B. J. McLeod Motorsports. The truck originally featured gun logos on the side, along with a decimal point in front of the No. 45 on the truck, for sponsor American Tactical. However, that scheme did not appear for the race. He start and parked, retiring with ignition problems on the first lap. A Velocity Channel reality show called "Regan Motorsports" ran around that time and focused on Regan's efforts along with B. J. McLeod. Regan made three more starts in 2015, starting and parking for two of them. In the only race that he did not, at Martinsville Speedway, he finished 25th, ten laps down after a mid-race spin. Regan attempted to make a comeback in 2016, but missed the cut at Texas Motor Speedway with McLeod and at Phoenix International Raceway with Jennifer Jo Cobb Racing. He made his first start of 2017 as a field-filler start and park entry at Texas Motor Speedway for Jennifer Jo Cobb Racing, finishing last. He returned the following week for Norm Benning Racing, completing a singular lap before falling out. Regan attempted one more race for NBR, failing to qualify; and two more for JCR, not finishing above 28th.

On April 19, 2017, it was announced that Regan would make his Monster Energy NASCAR Cup Series debut for Rick Ware Racing at Sonoma Raceway that summer. However, after the report came out Josh Bilicki said that he would drive the Sonoma race for the team. Regan instead raced at Sonoma with Premium Motorsports in their No. 55 car. After starting 37th, he finished 34th.

Prior to making his Cup Series debut in 2017, Regan stated that he wanted a full-time Cup ride by the 2019 season, although this did not end up happening and he has not driven in any NASCAR races since 2018, when he drove in the Truck race at Las Vegas Motor Speedway in the TJL Motorsports No. 1, finishing 27th.

== Motorsports career results ==
=== NASCAR ===
(key) (Bold – Pole position awarded by qualifying time. Italics – Pole position earned by points standings or practice time. * – Most laps led.)

==== Monster Energy Cup Series ====
Monster Energy NASCAR Cup Series results
| Year | Team | No. | Make | 1 | 2 | 3 | 4 | 5 | 6 | 7 | 8 | 9 | 10 | 11 | 12 | 13 | 14 | 15 | 16 | 17 | 18 | 19 | 20 | 21 | 22 | 23 | 24 | 25 | 26 | 27 | 28 | 29 | 30 | 31 | 32 | 33 | 34 | 35 | 36 | MENCC | Pts | Ref |
|---|---|---|---|---|---|---|---|---|---|---|---|---|---|---|---|---|---|---|---|---|---|---|---|---|---|---|---|---|---|---|---|---|---|---|---|---|---|---|---|---|---|---|
| 2017 | Premium Motorsports | 55 | Chevy | DAY | ATL | LVS | PHO | CAL | MAR | TEX | BRI | RCH | TAL | KAN | CLT | DOV | POC | MCH | SON; 34 | DAY | KEN | NHA | IND | POC | GLN | MCH | BRI | DAR | RCH | CHI | NHA | DOV | CLT | TAL | KAN | MAR | TEX | PHO | HOM | 47th | 3 | |

==== Camping World Truck Series ====
NASCAR Camping World Truck Series results
| Year | Team | No. | Make | 1 | 2 | 3 | 4 | 5 | 6 | 7 | 8 | 9 | 10 | 11 | 12 | 13 | 14 | 15 | 16 | 17 | 18 | 19 | 20 | 21 | 22 | 23 | NCWTC | Pts | Ref |
|---|---|---|---|---|---|---|---|---|---|---|---|---|---|---|---|---|---|---|---|---|---|---|---|---|---|---|---|---|---|
| 2014 | B. J. McLeod Motorsports | 45 | Chevy | DAY | MAR | KAN | CLT | DOV | TEX | GTW | KEN | IOW; 36 | ELD | POC | MCH | BRI | MSP | CHI | NHA | LVS | TAL | MAR | TEX | PHO | HOM | | 86th | 8 | |
| 2015 | B. J. McLeod Motorsports | 35 | Chevy | DAY | ATL | MAR; 25 | KAN | CLT | DOV | TEX | | | | | | | | | | | | | | | | | 49th | 55 | |
| 2015 | B. J. McLeod Motorsports | 45 | Chevy | | | | | | | | GTW; 24 | IOW; 28 | KEN | ELD | POC | MCH | BRI | MSP | CHI | NHA | LVS | TAL | MAR | TEX | PHO | HOM | 49th | 55 | |
| 2016 | B. J. McLeod Motorsports | 78 | Chevy | DAY | ATL | MAR | KAN | DOV | CLT | TEX | IOW | GTW | KEN | ELD | POC | BRI | MCH | MSP | CHI | NHA | LVS | TAL | MAR | TEX; DNQ | | | 111th | 0 | |
| 2016 | Jennifer Jo Cobb Racing | 10 | Chevy | | | | | | | | | | | | | | | | | | | | | | PHO; DNQ | HOM | 111th | 0 | |
| 2017 | Jennifer Jo Cobb Racing | 0 | Chevy | DAY | ATL | MAR | KAN | CLT | DOV | TEX; 28 | | | | | | | | MSP; 32 | CHI; 28 | NHA | LVS | TAL | MAR | TEX | PHO | HOM | 99th | 0^{1} | |
| 2017 | Norm Benning Racing | 57 | Chevy | | | | | | | | GTW; 29 | IOW | KEN | ELD; DNQ | POC | MCH | BRI | | | | | | | | | | 99th | 0^{1} | |
| 2018 | TJL Motorsports | 1 | Chevy | DAY | ATL | LVS; 27 | MAR | DOV | KAN | CLT | TEX | IOW | GTW | CHI | KEN | ELD | POC | MCH | BRI | MSP | LVS | TAL | MAR | TEX | PHO | HOM | 82nd | 10 | |

^{1} Ineligible for series points

==== K&N Pro Series West ====
NASCAR K&N Pro Series West results
| Year | Team | No. | Make | 1 | 2 | 3 | 4 | 5 | 6 | 7 | 8 | 9 | 10 | 11 | 12 | 13 | 14 | 15 | NKNPSWC | Pts | Ref |
|---|---|---|---|---|---|---|---|---|---|---|---|---|---|---|---|---|---|---|---|---|---|
| 2012 | Mike Holleran | 38 | Chevy | PHO | HAV | TOO | STO; 22 | IOW | BRA | LVS | | | | | | | | | 32nd | 89 | |
| 2012 | Mike Holleran | 38 | Ford | | | | | | | | | | | | | | AAS; 19 | PHO; 25 | 32nd | 89 | |
| 2012 | Marv Brown | 44 | Toyota | | | | | | | | SON; 21 | EVE | COL | IOW | POR | SAN | | | 32nd | 89 | |
