= Bryce Napier =

American stock car racing driver

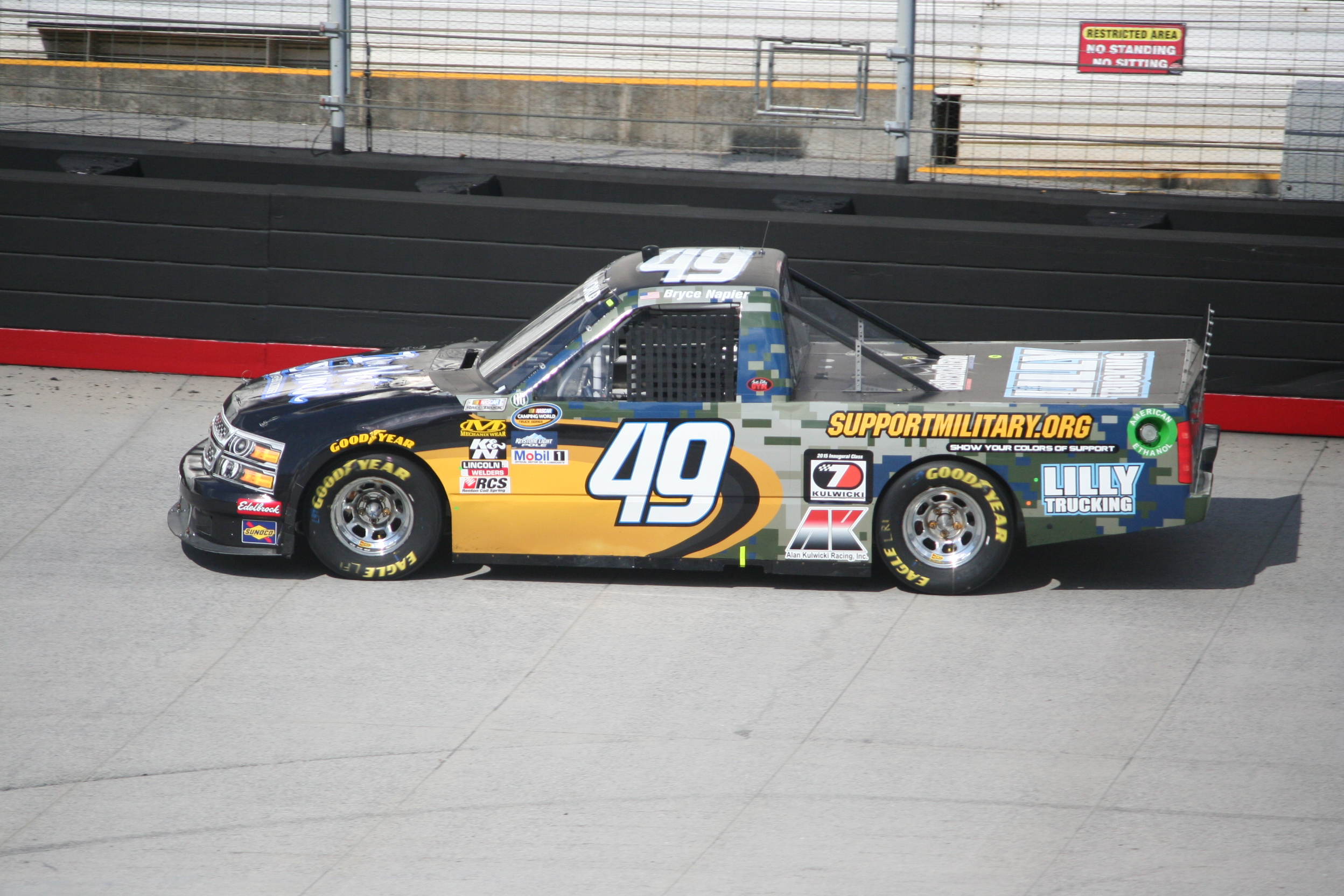
- Napier's No. 49 truck at Bristol Motor Speedway in 2016
- Born: August 12, 1999 (age 27); Scotts Valley, California, U.S.

NASCAR FedEx Freight Truck Series career
- 6 races run over 2 years
- 2017 position: 52nd
- Best finish: 48th (2016)
- First race: 2016 Alpha Energy Solutions 250 (Martinsville)
- Last race: 2017 M&M's 200 (Iowa)
Wins	Top tens	Poles
0	0	0
- Statistics up to date as of June 23, 2017.

Bryce Napier (born August 12, 1999) is an American former professional stock car racing driver. He has competed in the NASCAR Camping World Truck Series, driving for Rick Ware Racing, TJL Motorsports and Jennifer Jo Cobb Racing.

== Racing career ==
=== Early years ===
Napier started his racing career with go-karts and then moved up to quarter midgets and minicup cars, eventually winning five California minicup championships. Napier was Stockton 99 Speedway's Rookie of the Year in 2014 while driving a late model.

=== Camping World Truck Series ===
Napier debuted in the Truck Series in the 2016 Alpha Energy Solutions 250, starting last in the 32 car field and finishing 23rd, six laps down. He had set the June 18 Iowa 200 at Iowa Speedway as his next race, but did not compete in it. Instead, he signed with Premium Motorsports for the summer race at Bristol Motor Speedway. He returned to Premium's No. 49 truck at Phoenix International Raceway.

Napier returned to Martinsville in 2017, this time with TJL Motorsports. An early oil leak dropped him to last. On June 13, 2017, it was announced that Napier would run four races with Jennifer Jo Cobb Racing, including a race at Talladega Superspeedway after he turned 18. In the first race of the agreement, at Gateway Motorsports Park, Napier crashed in qualifying and had to move to JJC Racing's backup, the No. 0. Napier returned at Iowa, this time in the 10, but dropped out early after running the truck under a start and park operation. He did not attempt a race after that during the 2017 season.

== Personal life ==
Napier attended Cypress Charter High School in Live Oak, California, but then transferred to Natural Bridges High School in Santa Cruz. His grandfather was an English road racer.

== Motorsports career results ==
=== NASCAR ===
(key) (Bold – Pole position awarded by qualifying time. Italics – Pole position earned by points standings or practice time. * – Most laps led.)

==== Camping World Truck Series ====
NASCAR Camping World Truck Series results
Year	Team	No.	Make	1	2	3	4	5	6	7	8	9	10	11	12	13	14	15	16	17	18	19	20	21	22	23	NCWTC	Pts	Ref
2016	Rick Ware Racing	1	Chevy	DAY	ATL	MAR; 23	KAN	DOV	CLT	TEX	IOW	GTW	KEN	ELD	POC												48th	23	
2016	Rick Ware Racing	49	Chevy													BRI; 28	MCH	MSP	CHI	NHA	LVS	TAL	MAR	TEX	PHO; 25	HOM	48th	23	
2017	TJL Motorsports	1	Chevy	DAY	ATL	MAR; 32	KAN	CLT	DOV	TEX																	52nd	34	
2017	JJC Racing	0	Chevy								GTW; 20																52nd	34	
2017	JJC Racing	10	Chevy									IOW; 25	KEN	ELD	POC	MCH	BRI	MSP	CHI	NHA	LVS	TAL	MAR	TEX	PHO	HOM	52nd	34	

^{*} Season still in progress
^{1} Ineligible for series points
