= 2017 NASCAR Camping World Truck Series =

American motorsport season

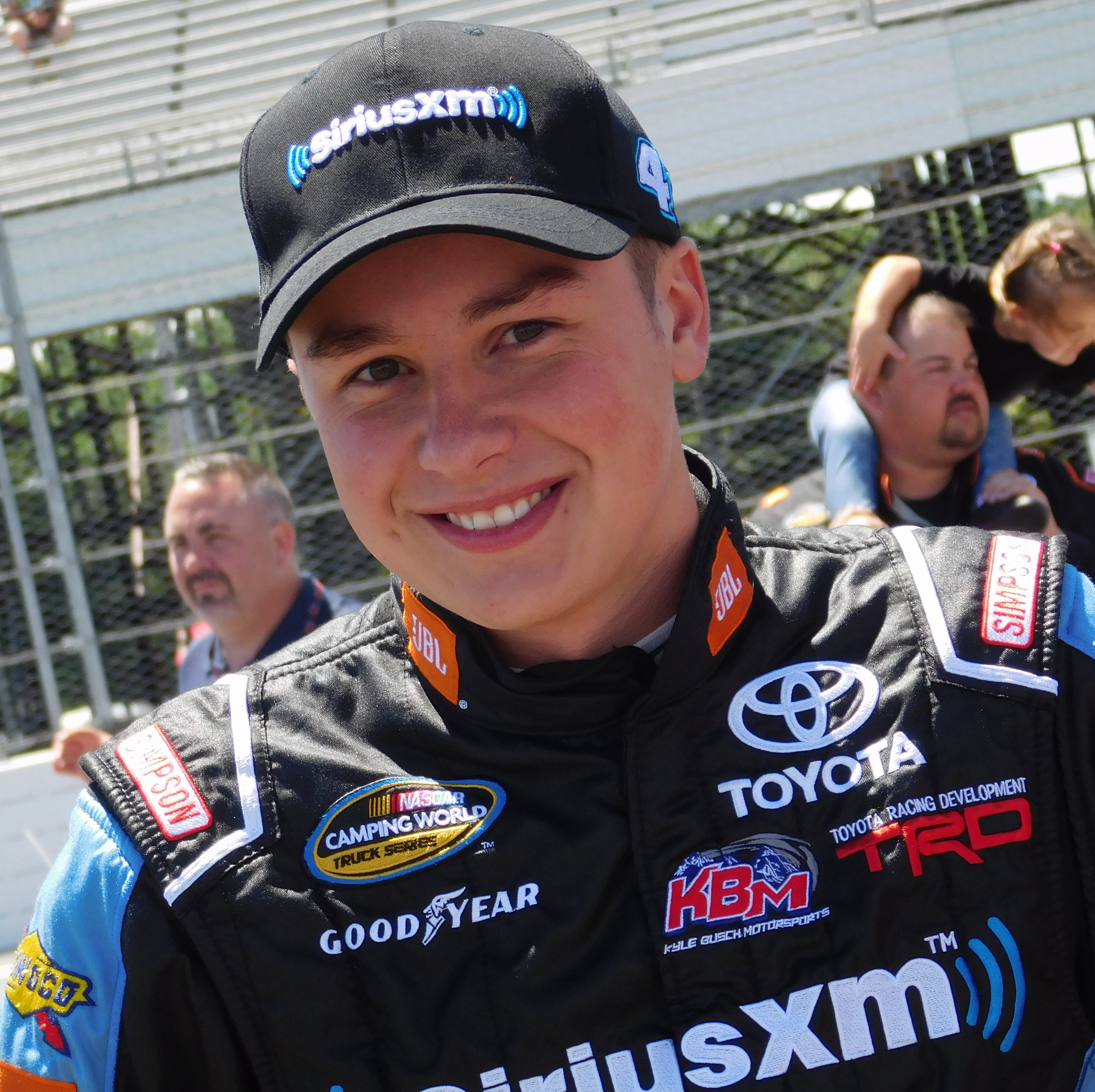
Christopher Bell, the 2017 Camping World Truck Series champion.

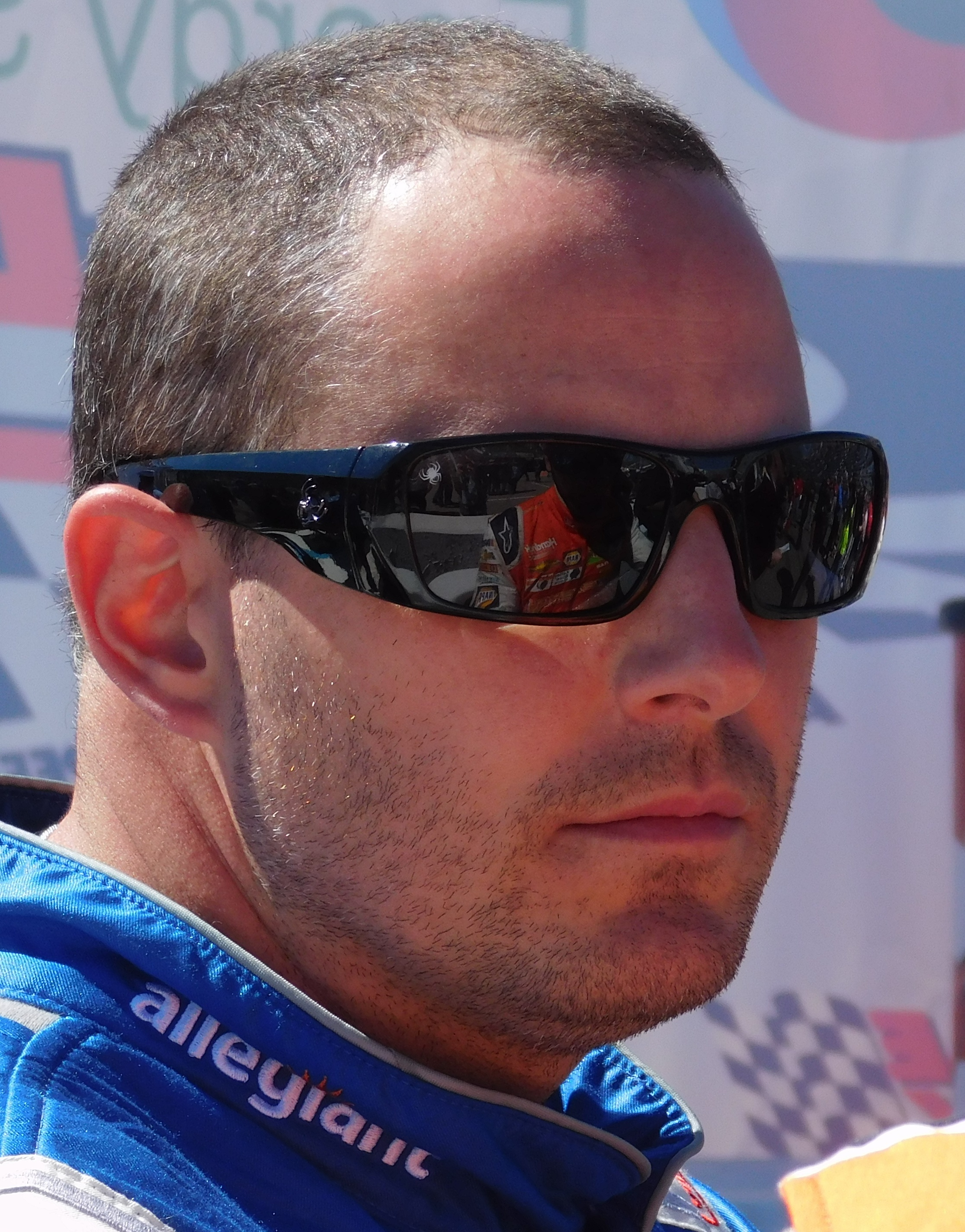
Johnny Sauter, the 2016 NCWTS Champion, finished 2nd in the Championship.

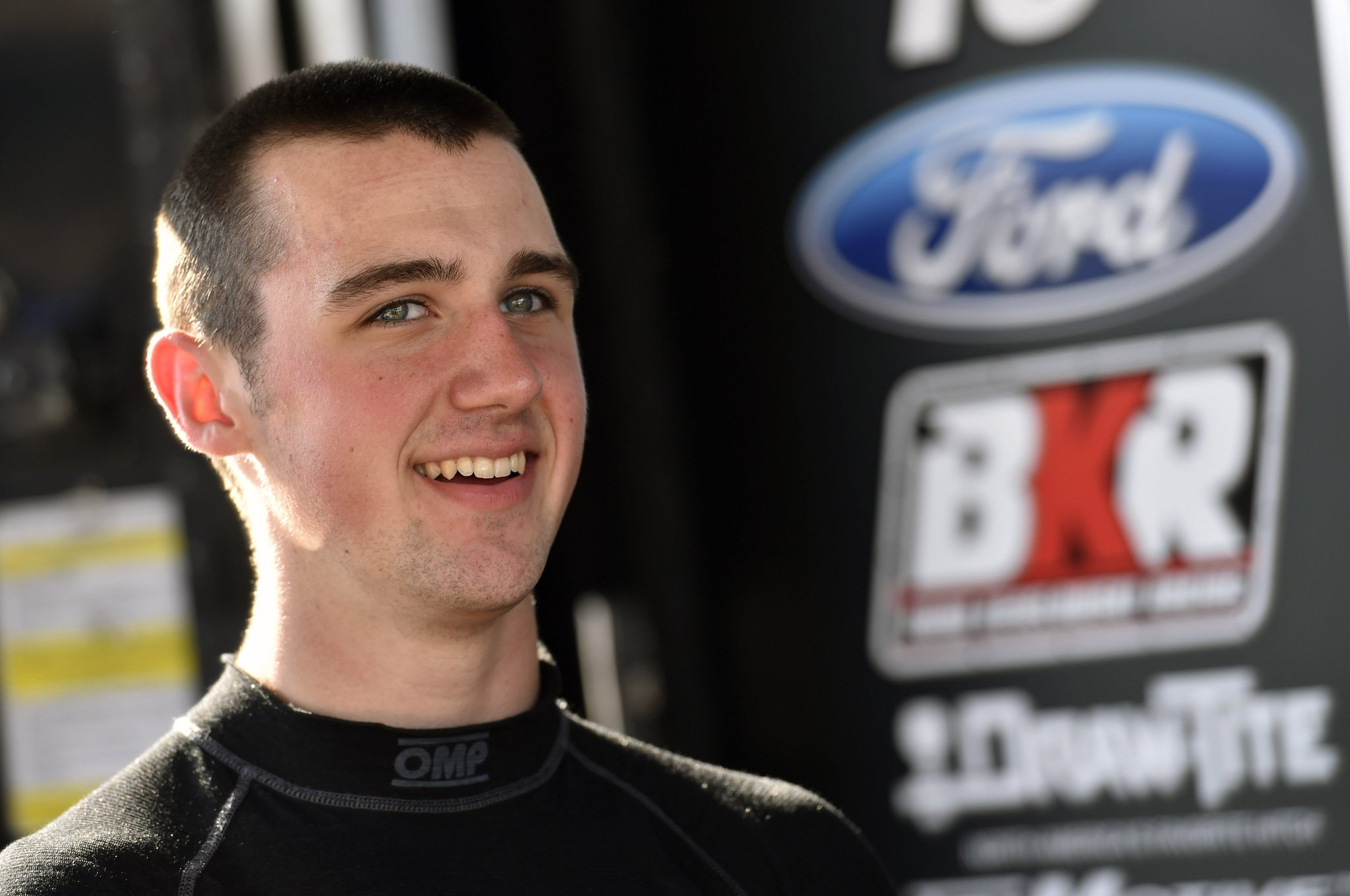
Austin Cindric finished third in the championship.

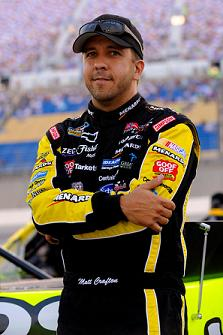
Matt Crafton, the 2013 and 2014 champion, finished fourth in the championship.

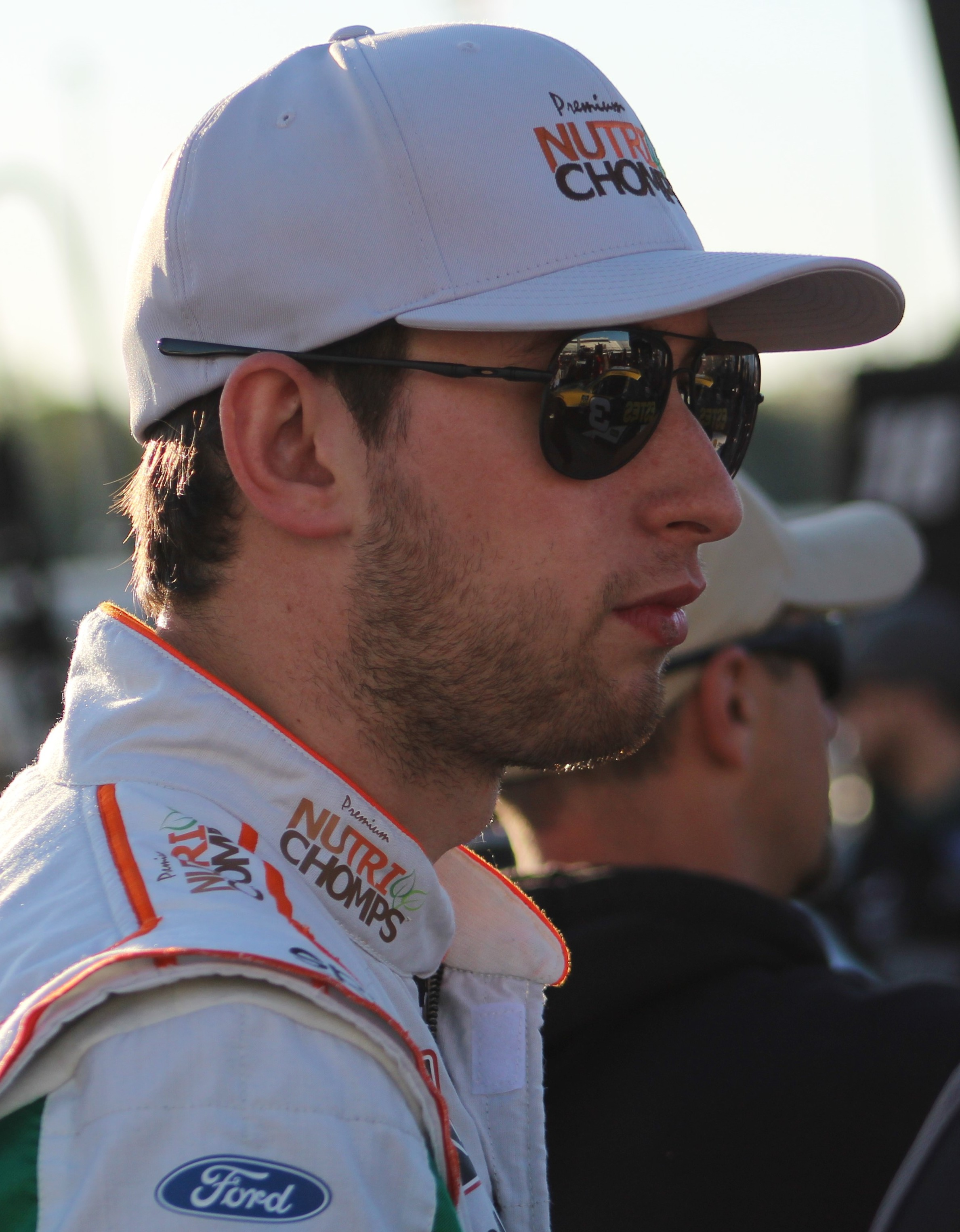
Chase Briscoe was the 2017 Camping World Truck series rookie of the year.

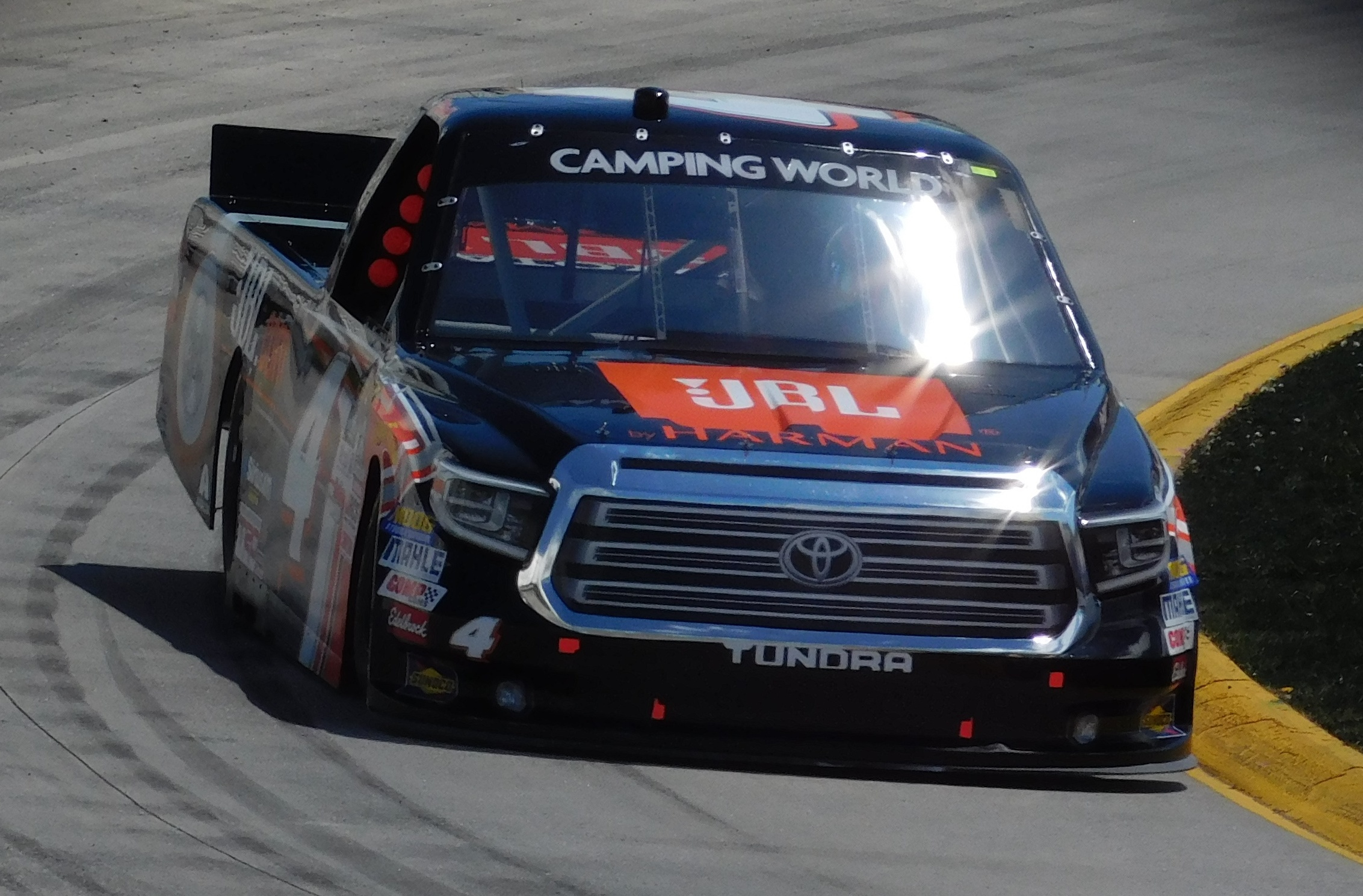
Toyota won the manufacturers' championship with 12 wins and 856 points.

The 2017 NASCAR Camping World Truck Series was the 23rd season of the Camping World Truck Series a pickup truck racing series sanctioned by NASCAR in North America. The season began with the NextEra Energy Resources 250 at Daytona International Speedway on February 24, 2017, and ended with the Ford EcoBoost 200 at Homestead–Miami Speedway on November 17. Johnny Sauter entered the season as the defending drivers' champion. This was the final season for Brad Keselowski Racing and for Red Horse Racing.

Christopher Bell of Kyle Busch Motorsports won the driver's championship with a second-place finish in the season finale, Kyle Busch won the owner's championship for the fifth consecutive season, and Toyota won the manufacturer's championship.

This was the second year that the Truck Series (and the Xfinity Series) had a playoff system. Three of the four "championship 4" drivers (who are shown below), were the same as last year's; the only difference being Austin Cindric in it instead of Timothy Peters.

== Teams and drivers ==
=== Complete schedule ===
Manufacturer	Team	No.	Race driver	Crew chief
Chevrolet	Bobby Gerhart Racing	63	Bobby Gerhart 2 (Note: Entries were fielded in a collaboration with MB Motorsports.)	Brian Keselowski
Chevrolet	MB Motorsports (Note: MB Motorsports and Copp Motorsports shared the Nos. 36/63/83 and helped each other at the track in all their entries.)	63	Kyle Donahue 3	Wade Lear 2 Mike Mittler 1 Doug George 1 Dylan Warner 1 Kevin Campbell 1 Rick Ren 2 Robbie Freeman 1 Richard Mason 1
Chevrolet	MB Motorsports	63	Kevin Donahue 3	Wade Lear 2 Mike Mittler 1 Doug George 1 Dylan Warner 1 Kevin Campbell 1 Rick Ren 2 Robbie Freeman 1 Richard Mason 1
Chevrolet	MB Motorsports	63	Bobby Pierce 1	Wade Lear 2 Mike Mittler 1 Doug George 1 Dylan Warner 1 Kevin Campbell 1 Rick Ren 2 Robbie Freeman 1 Richard Mason 1
Chevrolet	MB Motorsports	63	Travis Kvapil 1	Wade Lear 2 Mike Mittler 1 Doug George 1 Dylan Warner 1 Kevin Campbell 1 Rick Ren 2 Robbie Freeman 1 Richard Mason 1
Chevrolet	MB Motorsports	63	Landon Huffman 1	Wade Lear 2 Mike Mittler 1 Doug George 1 Dylan Warner 1 Kevin Campbell 1 Rick Ren 2 Robbie Freeman 1 Richard Mason 1
Chevrolet	MB Motorsports	63	Chris Windom 2	Wade Lear 2 Mike Mittler 1 Doug George 1 Dylan Warner 1 Kevin Campbell 1 Rick Ren 2 Robbie Freeman 1 Richard Mason 1
Chevrolet	MB Motorsports	63	Ted Minor 1	Wade Lear 2 Mike Mittler 1 Doug George 1 Dylan Warner 1 Kevin Campbell 1 Rick Ren 2 Robbie Freeman 1 Richard Mason 1
Chevrolet	Copp Motorsports	63	J. J. Yeley 2	Wade Lear 2 Mike Mittler 1 Doug George 1 Dylan Warner 1 Kevin Campbell 1 Rick Ren 2 Robbie Freeman 1 Richard Mason 1
Chevrolet	Copp Motorsports	63	Todd Peck 3 (Note: Entries were fielded in a collaboration with Peck Motorsports.)	Wade Lear 2 Mike Mittler 1 Doug George 1 Dylan Warner 1 Kevin Campbell 1 Rick Ren 2 Robbie Freeman 1 Richard Mason 1
Chevrolet	Copp Motorsports	63	Camden Murphy 3	Wade Lear 2 Mike Mittler 1 Doug George 1 Dylan Warner 1 Kevin Campbell 1 Rick Ren 2 Robbie Freeman 1 Richard Mason 1
Chevrolet	Copp Motorsports	63	B. J. McLeod 1	Wade Lear 2 Mike Mittler 1 Doug George 1 Dylan Warner 1 Kevin Campbell 1 Rick Ren 2 Robbie Freeman 1 Richard Mason 1
Chevrolet	Copp Motorsports	83	Todd Peck 7	Keith Wolfe 9 Kevin Campbell 1
Chevrolet	Copp Motorsports	83	Donnie Levister 1	Keith Wolfe 9 Kevin Campbell 1
Chevrolet	Copp Motorsports	83	J. J. Yeley 4	Keith Wolfe 9 Kevin Campbell 1
Chevrolet	Copp Motorsports	83	Camden Murphy 4	Keith Wolfe 9 Kevin Campbell 1
Chevrolet	Copp Motorsports	83	Mike Senica 1	Keith Wolfe 9 Kevin Campbell 1
Chevrolet	Copp Motorsports	83	Patrick Emerling 2	Keith Wolfe 9 Kevin Campbell 1
Chevrolet	Copp Motorsports	83	Spencer Boyd 1	Keith Wolfe 9 Kevin Campbell 1
Chevrolet	Copp Motorsports	83	Bayley Currey 2	Keith Wolfe 9 Kevin Campbell 1
Chevrolet	MB Motorsports	83	Landon Huffman 1	Keith Wolfe 9 Kevin Campbell 1
Chevrolet	GMS Racing	21	Johnny Sauter	Joe Shear Jr.
Chevrolet	GMS Racing	24	Scott Lagasse Jr. 1	Kevin Bellicourt
Chevrolet	GMS Racing	24	Alex Bowman 1	Kevin Bellicourt
Chevrolet	GMS Racing	24	Justin Haley (R) 21	Kevin Bellicourt
Chevrolet	GMS Racing	33	Kaz Grala (R)	Jerry Baxter
Chevrolet	NEMCO Motorsports	8	John Hunter Nemechek	Gere Kennon Jr.
Chevrolet	Norm Benning Racing	6	Norm Benning	Christopher Aunspaw
Chevrolet	Premium Motorsports	49	Wendell Chavous (R) 20	Wayne Carroll 8 Mike Hillman Sr. 1 Brian Keselowski 1
Chevrolet	Premium Motorsports	49	Gary Klutt 1	Wayne Carroll 8 Mike Hillman Sr. 1 Brian Keselowski 1
Chevrolet	Premium Motorsports	49	Robby Lyons 2	Wayne Carroll 8 Mike Hillman Sr. 1 Brian Keselowski 1
Chevrolet	TJL Motorsports	1	Tim Viens 1	Rodney Jobman 1 Darwin Peters Jr. 1 Mike Harmon 4 Ryan Anderson 1 Ryan Fields 3
Chevrolet	TJL Motorsports	1	Mike Harmon 1	Rodney Jobman 1 Darwin Peters Jr. 1 Mike Harmon 4 Ryan Anderson 1 Ryan Fields 3
Chevrolet	TJL Motorsports	1	Bryce Napier 1	Rodney Jobman 1 Darwin Peters Jr. 1 Mike Harmon 4 Ryan Anderson 1 Ryan Fields 3
Chevrolet	TJL Motorsports	1	Jordan Anderson 18	Rodney Jobman 1 Darwin Peters Jr. 1 Mike Harmon 4 Ryan Anderson 1 Ryan Fields 3
Chevrolet	TJL Motorsports	1	Brandon Hightower 1	Rodney Jobman 1 Darwin Peters Jr. 1 Mike Harmon 4 Ryan Anderson 1 Ryan Fields 3
Chevrolet	Mike Harmon Racing	1	Mike Harmon 1 (Note: Entry was fielded in a collaboration with TJL Motorsports.)	Rodney Jobman 1 Darwin Peters Jr. 1 Mike Harmon 4 Ryan Anderson 1 Ryan Fields 3
Chevrolet	Jennifer Jo Cobb Racing	10	Jennifer Jo Cobb 19	Steve Kuykendall 3 Tim Silva 6
Chevrolet	Jennifer Jo Cobb Racing	10	Bryce Napier 1	Steve Kuykendall 3 Tim Silva 6
Chevrolet	Jennifer Jo Cobb Racing	10	Ray Ciccarelli 2	Steve Kuykendall 3 Tim Silva 6
Ford	Jennifer Jo Cobb Racing	10	Chuck Buchanan Jr. 1 (Note: Entry was fielded in a collaboration with Charles Buchanan Racing.)	Craig Wood
Ford	Brad Keselowski Racing	19	Austin Cindric (R)	Doug Randolph
Ford	Brad Keselowski Racing	29	Chase Briscoe (R)	Mike Hillman Jr. 15; Buddy Sisco 8
Toyota	Hattori Racing Enterprises	16	Ryan Truex	Scott Zipadelli
Toyota	Kyle Busch Motorsports	4	Christopher Bell	Rudy Fugle
Toyota	Kyle Busch Motorsports	18	Noah Gragson (R)	Marcus Richmond
Toyota	Kyle Busch Motorsports	51	Myatt Snider 8	Kevin Manion 19; Mike Hillman Jr. 4
Toyota	Kyle Busch Motorsports	51	Kyle Busch 5	Kevin Manion 19; Mike Hillman Jr. 4
Toyota	Kyle Busch Motorsports	51	Harrison Burton 6	Kevin Manion 19; Mike Hillman Jr. 4
Toyota	Kyle Busch Motorsports	51	Todd Gilliland 4	Kevin Manion 19; Mike Hillman Jr. 4
Toyota	ThorSport Racing	13	Cody Coughlin (R)	Michael Shelton
Toyota	ThorSport Racing	27	Ben Rhodes	Eddie Troconis
Toyota	ThorSport Racing	88	Matt Crafton	Carl Joiner Jr.
Toyota	ThorSport Racing	98	Grant Enfinger (R)	Jeff Hensley
Chevrolet 20 Toyota 3	Niece Motorsports	45	T. J. Bell 14	Cody Efaw
Chevrolet 20 Toyota 3	Niece Motorsports	45	Austin Wayne Self 4 (Note: Self's and Fontaine's races in the No. 45 were fielded in a collaboration with AM Racing.)	Cody Efaw
Chevrolet 20 Toyota 3	Niece Motorsports	45	Jeffrey Abbey 2	Cody Efaw
Chevrolet 20 Toyota 3	Niece Motorsports	45	Victor Gonzalez Jr. 1	Cody Efaw
Chevrolet 20 Toyota 3	Niece Motorsports	45	Justin Fontaine 1	Cody Efaw
Chevrolet 20 Toyota 3	Niece Motorsports	45	Travis Pastrana 1	Cody Efaw
Chevrolet	Young's Motorsports	02	Tyler Young 6	Andrew Abbott 2 Steven Dawson 1 Bruce Cook 4 Chad Kendrick 2 Matt Petrea 1
Chevrolet	Young's Motorsports	02	Scott Lagasse Jr. 1	Andrew Abbott 2 Steven Dawson 1 Bruce Cook 4 Chad Kendrick 2 Matt Petrea 1
Chevrolet	Young's Motorsports	02	Max Johnston 1	Andrew Abbott 2 Steven Dawson 1 Bruce Cook 4 Chad Kendrick 2 Matt Petrea 1
Chevrolet	Young's Motorsports	02	Alex Tagliani 1	Andrew Abbott 2 Steven Dawson 1 Bruce Cook 4 Chad Kendrick 2 Matt Petrea 1
Chevrolet	Young's Motorsports	02	Timothy Peters 2	Andrew Abbott 2 Steven Dawson 1 Bruce Cook 4 Chad Kendrick 2 Matt Petrea 1
Ford	Young's Motorsports	02	Austin Hill 12 (Note: Entries were fielded in a collaboration with Austin Hill Racing.)	Andrew Abbott 2 Steven Dawson 1 Bruce Cook 4 Chad Kendrick 2 Matt Petrea 1

=== Limited schedule ===
Manufacturer	Team	No.	Race driver	Crew chief	Rounds
Chevrolet	Beaver Motorsports	50	Travis Kvapil	Tim Silva 3 Joe Majenski 3 Rob Winfield 4 Tim Goulet 2 Dylan Corum 1	2
Chevrolet	Beaver Motorsports	50	Akinori Ogata	Tim Silva 3 Joe Majenski 3 Rob Winfield 4 Tim Goulet 2 Dylan Corum 1	1
Chevrolet	Beaver Motorsports	50	Cody Ware (Note: Entries were fielded in a collaboration with Rick Ware Racing.)	Tim Silva 3 Joe Majenski 3 Rob Winfield 4 Tim Goulet 2 Dylan Corum 1	2
Chevrolet	Beaver Motorsports	50	Spencer Boyd	Tim Silva 3 Joe Majenski 3 Rob Winfield 4 Tim Goulet 2 Dylan Corum 1	1
Chevrolet	Beaver Motorsports	50	Josh Reaume	Tim Silva 3 Joe Majenski 3 Rob Winfield 4 Tim Goulet 2 Dylan Corum 1	13
Chevrolet	Beaver Motorsports	50	Mike Harmon (Note: Entries were fielded in a collaboration with Mike Harmon Racing.)	Tim Silva 3 Joe Majenski 3 Rob Winfield 4 Tim Goulet 2 Dylan Corum 1	1
Chevrolet	Beaver Motorsports	50	Bobby Reuse	Tim Silva 3 Joe Majenski 3 Rob Winfield 4 Tim Goulet 2 Dylan Corum 1	1
Chevrolet	Beaver Motorsports	50	Bayley Currey	Tim Silva 3 Joe Majenski 3 Rob Winfield 4 Tim Goulet 2 Dylan Corum 1	1
Chevrolet	Bolen Motorsports	66	Ross Chastain	Paul Clapprood	7
Chevrolet	Bolen Motorsports	66	Travis Kvapil	Paul Clapprood	2
Chevrolet	Bolen Motorsports	66	Trey Hutchens	Paul Clapprood	1
Chevrolet	Bolen Motorsports	66	Ken Schrader	Paul Clapprood	1
Chevrolet	Bolen Motorsports	66	Jason Hathaway	Paul Clapprood	1
Chevrolet	Bolen Motorsports	66	Vinnie Miller	Paul Clapprood	1
Chevrolet	Brandonbilt Motorsports	86	Brandon Brown	Adam Brenner	1
Chevrolet	Brandonbilt Motorsports	86	Mason Diaz	Adam Brenner	1
Chevrolet	Clay Greenfield Motorsports	68	Clay Greenfield	Danny Gill 1 Chad Kendrick 1	4
Chevrolet	Copp Motorsports	36	Camden Murphy	Mike Mittler 2 D. J. Copp 1 Kevin Campbell 1	4
Chevrolet	Copp Motorsports	36	J. J. Yeley	Mike Mittler 2 D. J. Copp 1 Kevin Campbell 1	1
Chevrolet	Copp Motorsports	36	B. J. McLeod	Mike Mittler 2 D. J. Copp 1 Kevin Campbell 1	1
Chevrolet	MB Motorsports	36	Kevin Donahue	Mike Mittler 2 D. J. Copp 1 Kevin Campbell 1	2
Chevrolet	MB Motorsports	36	Chris Windom	Mike Mittler 2 D. J. Copp 1 Kevin Campbell 1	2
Chevrolet	Cram Racing Enterprises	11	Dawson Cram	Clinton Cram	1
Chevrolet	FDNY Racing	28	Bryan Dauzat	John Delvito	2
Chevrolet	GMS Racing	23	Spencer Gallagher	Jeff Stankiewicz 2 Joey Cohen 1	1
Chevrolet	GMS Racing	23	Chase Elliott	Jeff Stankiewicz 2 Joey Cohen 1	2
Chevrolet	Halmar Friesen Racing	52	Stewart Friesen (R)	Trip Bruce	19
Chevrolet	Jennifer Jo Cobb Racing	0	Tommy Regan	Joe Majenski 1 Daniel Sowers Jr. 6 Ken Evans 1 Tim Goulet 1	3
Chevrolet	Jennifer Jo Cobb Racing	0	Bryce Napier	Joe Majenski 1 Daniel Sowers Jr. 6 Ken Evans 1 Tim Goulet 1	1
Chevrolet	Jennifer Jo Cobb Racing	0	Jennifer Jo Cobb	Joe Majenski 1 Daniel Sowers Jr. 6 Ken Evans 1 Tim Goulet 1	2
Chevrolet	Jennifer Jo Cobb Racing	0	Korbin Forrister	Joe Majenski 1 Daniel Sowers Jr. 6 Ken Evans 1 Tim Goulet 1	1
Chevrolet	Jennifer Jo Cobb Racing	0	Matt Mills	Joe Majenski 1 Daniel Sowers Jr. 6 Ken Evans 1 Tim Goulet 1	2
Chevrolet	Jennifer Jo Cobb Racing	0	Ray Ciccarelli	Joe Majenski 1 Daniel Sowers Jr. 6 Ken Evans 1 Tim Goulet 1	4
Chevrolet	Long Motorsports	14	Ted Minor	Garry Stephens	2
Chevrolet	Martins Motorsports	42	Tommy Joe Martins (Note: Tommy Joe Martins crashed the only truck the team had, so Mike Harmon let Martins drive his backup truck renumbered to No. 42 in the race.)	Kevyn Rebolledo	1
Chevrolet	Martins Motorsports	44	Brandon Brown (Note: Entries were fielded in a collaboration with Brandonbilt Motorsports.)	Adam Brenner 2 Kevin Eagle 5 Shane Lamb 2	2
Chevrolet	Martins Motorsports	44	Tommy Joe Martins	Adam Brenner 2 Kevin Eagle 5 Shane Lamb 2	1
Chevrolet	Martins Motorsports	44	Matt Mills	Adam Brenner 2 Kevin Eagle 5 Shane Lamb 2	1
Chevrolet	Martins Motorsports	44	J. R. Heffner	Adam Brenner 2 Kevin Eagle 5 Shane Lamb 2	1
Chevrolet	Martins Motorsports	44	Austin Wayne Self (Note: Self's races in the No. 44 were fielded in a collaboration with AM Racing.)	Adam Brenner 2 Kevin Eagle 5 Shane Lamb 2	9
Chevrolet	Faith Motorsports	44	Matt Mills	Adam Brenner 2 Kevin Eagle 5 Shane Lamb 2	3
Chevrolet	Faith Motorsports	44	Donnie Levister	Adam Brenner 2 Kevin Eagle 5 Shane Lamb 2	1
Chevrolet	Faith Motorsports	44	Ted Minor	Adam Brenner 2 Kevin Eagle 5 Shane Lamb 2	1
Chevrolet	MDM Motorsports	99	Tommy Joe Martins	Shane Huffman	1
Chevrolet	MDM Motorsports	99	Austin Dillon	Shane Huffman	1
Chevrolet	MDM Motorsports	99	Ty Dillon	Shane Huffman	2
Chevrolet	MDM Motorsports	99	Travis Miller	Shane Huffman	1
Chevrolet	MDM Motorsports	99	Brandon Jones	Shane Huffman	5
Chevrolet	MDM Motorsports	99	Timothy Peters	Shane Huffman	1
Chevrolet	MDM Motorsports	99	Bubba Wallace	Shane Huffman	1
Chevrolet	MDM Motorsports	99	Brian Wong	Shane Huffman	1
Chevrolet	MDM Motorsports	99	Cale Gale	Shane Huffman	1
Chevrolet	MDM Motorsports	99	Dalton Sargeant	Shane Huffman	2
Chevrolet	Mike Harmon Racing	74	Jordan Anderson	Mike Harmon	1
Chevrolet	Mike Harmon Racing	74	Joe Hudson	Mark Beaver	1
Chevrolet	Mike Harmon Racing	74	Mike Harmon	Alan Collins Jr.	2
Chevrolet	NEMCO Motorsports	87	Joe Nemechek	Jim Mazza 4 Michael Leoncini 2	17
Chevrolet	NEMCO Motorsports	87	Ty Dillon	Jim Mazza 4 Michael Leoncini 2	1
Chevrolet	Niece Motorsports	38	T. J. Bell	Ron Paradiso	2
Chevrolet	Norm Benning Racing	57	Tommy Regan	Ryan Miller 3 Brian Poff 1	2
Chevrolet	Norm Benning Racing	57	J. J. Yeley	Ryan Miller 3 Brian Poff 1	1
Chevrolet	Norm Benning Racing	57	B. J. McLeod	Ryan Miller 3 Brian Poff 1	1
Chevrolet	Norm Benning Racing	57	Mike Senica	Ryan Miller 3 Brian Poff 1	11
Chevrolet	Premium Motorsports	15	Gray Gaulding	Wayne Carroll	4
Chevrolet	Premium Motorsports	15	D. J. Kennington	Wayne Carroll	1
Chevrolet	Premium Motorsports	15	Jason Hathaway	Wayne Carroll	1
Chevrolet	Premium Motorsports	15	Wendell Chavous (R)	Wayne Carroll	1
Chevrolet	Rick Ware Racing	12	Spencer Boyd	Joe Lax 1 R. B. Bracken 1 Cody Ware 1 Jeff Spraker 2	2
Chevrolet	Rick Ware Racing	12	Jordan Anderson	Joe Lax 1 R. B. Bracken 1 Cody Ware 1 Jeff Spraker 2	2
Chevrolet	Rick Ware Racing	12	Cody Ware	Joe Lax 1 R. B. Bracken 1 Cody Ware 1 Jeff Spraker 2	1
Chevrolet	Young's Motorsports	20	Tyler Young	Bruce Cook	2
Chevrolet	Young's Motorsports	20	Sheldon Creed	Andrew Abbott	1
Chevrolet	Young's Motorsports	20	Jeb Burton	Andrew Abbott	1
Ford	Jacob Wallace Racing	80	Justin Shipley	Tracy Wallace	1
Ford	RBR Enterprises	92	Regan Smith	Michael Hester	13
Ford	Rette Jones Racing	30	Terry Jones	Mark Rette	1
Toyota	AM Racing	22	J. J. Yeley	Rick Ren 2 Bill Henderson 3	1
Toyota	AM Racing	22	Austin Wayne Self	Rick Ren 2 Bill Henderson 3	5
Toyota	AM Racing	32	Austin Wayne Self	Bill Henderson	1
Toyota	AM Racing	66	Justin Fontaine (Note: Entry was fielded in a collaboration with Bolen Motorsports.)	Bill Henderson	1
Toyota	Gaunt Brothers Racing	96	D. J. Kennington	A. J. Genail	1
Toyota	Glenden Enterprises	47	Chris Fontaine	Kevin Ingram	2
Toyota	ThorSport Racing	89	Rico Abreu	Bud Haefele	1
Toyota	JJL Motorsports	97	Jesse Little	Mike Ford 1 A. J. Genail 2	4
Toyota	Kyle Busch Motorsports	46	Todd Gilliland	Cody Glick	2
Toyota	Kyle Busch Motorsports	46	Kyle Busch	Cody Glick	2
Toyota	Red Horse Racing	7	Brett Moffitt	Butch Hylton	5
Toyota	Red Horse Racing	17	Timothy Peters	Chad Kendrick	5
Toyota	Wauters Motorsports	5	Korbin Forrister	Richie Wauters	2
Toyota	Henderson Motorsports	75	Parker Kligerman	Chris Carrier	8
Chevrolet	Henderson Motorsports	75	Caleb Holman	Chris Carrier	2

=== Changes ===
==== Drivers ====
- NASCAR Next driver Noah Gragson will drive the No. 18 Toyota Tundra for Kyle Busch Motorsports in the 2017 season, replacing William Byron. Gragson competed in the 2016 NASCAR K&N Pro Series East and West where he finished 5th and 3rd, respectively, in the points standings and drove two races for Wauters Motorsports in 2016 at Phoenix and Homestead.
- After having driven a partial schedule in 2016, Austin Cindric will drive full-time for Brad Keselowski Racing in 2017.
- Kaz Grala is promoted to a full-time ride with GMS Racing to pilot the No. 33 Chevrolet, replacing Ben Kennedy. Grala competed the No. 33 and No. 24 trucks part-time last season with the same team.
- 2016 K&N Pro Series East champion Justin Haley will drive the No. 24 for GMS Racing, starting at Martinsville due to age restrictions. Scott Lagasse Jr. will drive the truck for Daytona and Alex Bowman will drive at Atlanta.
- Kyle Busch along with young drivers Myatt Snider, Harrison Burton, and K&N West Champion Todd Gilliland will share the No. 51 Truck for 2017, replacing Cody Coughlin and Daniel Suárez. Gilliland competed in the K&N Pro Series West for Billy McAnally Racing where he secured his first championship in 2016. Burton competed in the K&N Pro Series East for HScott Motorsports with Justin Marks and drove one race for KBM in 2016 at Martinsville. Snider did one race for AM Racing at Martinsville in October.
- Justin Fontaine will drive AM Racing's second truck part-time. Fontaine drove one race for the team in 2016 at Phoenix.
- As a part of Ford Performance's driver development program, Chase Briscoe will drive for Brad Keselowski Racing in 2017. Briscoe won the 2016 ARCA Racing Series championship.
- Spencer Boyd and Cody Ware will share driving duties for Rick Ware Racing in 2017. Jordan Anderson will drive the truck at Atlanta and Martinsville.
- Joe Nemechek will return to the truck series part-time driving the No. 87 for his team NEMCO Motorsports.
- After having driven a partial schedule for Kyle Busch Motorsports and Athenian Motorsports in 2016, Cody Coughlin will drive the No. 13 full-time for ThorSport Racing in 2017, replacing Cameron Hayley.
- Grant Enfinger will drive a truck full-time for ThorSport Racing, replacing Rico Abreu. Enfinger drove a partial schedule for GMS Racing in 2016.
- After driving full-time for Tommy Baldwin Racing in the 2016 NASCAR Sprint Cup Series Season, Regan Smith will return to the Truck Series driving the No. 92 RBR Enterprises Ford part-time in 12 races. Smith's last Truck start was in 2008, in the Cool City Customs 200 at the Michigan International Speedway.
- Parker Kligerman will drive the No. 75 Truck for Henderson Motorsports, sharing driving duties with Caleb Holman. Kligerman drove the No. 92 RBR Enterprises Ford part-time last season.
- J. J. Yeley returned to the Truck Series, driving the No. 22 AM Racing Toyota at the NextEra Energy Resources 250. Austin Wayne Self, who will drive for this team the rest of the season except at Atlanta where the team skipped the race, also will drive the No. 32 at the opener.
- Wendell Chavous will attempt to run for the Rookie of the Year honors in the 2017 season. He will drive the No. 49 Chevrolet for Premium Motorsports. Chavous's last start was in 2015.
- T. J. Bell returned to the Truck Series, driving part-time the No. 45 Chevrolet for Niece Motorsports starting at Daytona and 5 other races.
- After running part-time for Red Horse Racing and scoring a win in the 2016 season, Brett Moffitt returned to the team, driving the No. 7 (renumbered from 11) for the first 5 races of the season before the team shutting down.
- Korbin Forrister will return to drive full-time in the 2017 season. He will be driving the No. 5 Toyota for Wauters Motorsports. However, the team withdrew before the spring Martinsville race for unknown reasons and have not run since.
- Todd Peck drove the new No. 83 Chevy for the new Copp Motorsports team at Daytona, Atlanta, and Kansas. Donnie Levister drove the truck at Martinsville.
- Terry Jones drove the No. 30 Ford for Rette Jones Racing at Daytona.
- Victor Gonzalez Jr. drove the No. 45 Chevrolet for Niece Motorsports at Mosport Park.
- Ted Minor returned to NASCAR after almost 3 years absence at Iowa driving for a new team: Long Motorsports.
- Alex Tagliani drove the 02 for Young's Motorsports at Canadian Motorsports Park.
- Cale Gale drove the 99 for MDM Motorsports at Martinsville Speedway.
- Jeb Burton drove the 20 for Young's Motorsports at Martinsville Speedway. It was Burton's first truck start in almost two years.

==== Teams ====
- JR Motorsports announced on January 3 that it would suspend its Truck Series team. Cole Custer drove the truck full-time in 2016. The team later sold six trucks and their No. 00 owners points to Halmar Friesen Racing.
- Rick Ware Racing announced that it would return to the Truck Series full-time in 2017, having purchased the owners points of SS-Green Light Racing's No. 07 truck.
- Athenian Motorsports announced on January 10 that it would cease operations due to the retirement of driver John Wes Townley.
- Hattori Racing Enterprises expands from part-time to full-time with Ryan Truex returning to the team and renumbered from No. 81 to No. 16.
- NEMCO Motorsports will expand to a two truck team with Joe Nemechek driving the No. 87 Chevrolet Silverado part-time in the first 3 races. After that, they sold their owner points to JJC Racing. The No. 87 returned at Gateway.
- Martins Motorsports announced on February 9 a partnership with Brandonbilt Motorsports for the 2017 season. Brandon Brown will drive the No. 44 Chevrolet at 4 races. On April 14, it was announced that Martins Motorsports will shut down their Truck Series program to move on a part-time basis in Xfinity Series. They sold the owner points to Faith Motorsports. However, after 7 races Martins Motorsports returned.
- After running full-time between the 2015 and 2016 seasons, GMS Racing's No. 23 Chevrolet will run part-time in 3 races. Spencer Gallagher at Daytona, Chase Elliott at Atlanta and Martinsville. Elliott won Martinsville race. After that, they switch the owner points with No. 24, so the No. 24 is locked for all races until the end of the season because is a race winner in the season and also will make the owners' championship playoffs. The former No. 24 owner points they sold to Norm Benning Racing.
- Contreras Motorsports has sold their assets to Copp Motorsports who now runs the No. 83 Chevrolet.
- MDM Motorsports will run the No. 99 Chevrolet full-time after running part-time in 2016. The team had purchased the owners points of Athenian Motorsports' No. 05 truck.
- Red Horse Racing announced on May 22 that it would suspend operations effective immediately due to a lack of funding. The team had fielded two full-time trucks for Brett Moffitt and Timothy Peters.
- Brad Keselowski Racing announced on August 17 that will shut down following the conclusion of the 2017 season.

== Rule changes ==
- On October 26, NASCAR announced that drivers with more than five years of full-time racing on the Cup level may drive a maximum of seven Camping World Truck Series races. They are also ineligible to drive in the final eight races of the season. Exceptions will be given to drivers with more than five years of full-time racing on the Cup level if they declared to run points in Truck Series.
- On February 8, 2017, NASCAR announced a new damaged vehicle policy for all three national series. Body panels can no longer be replaced after a wreck, and a team has five minutes on pit road to fix the damage before they are eliminated.
- As in the NASCAR Cup Series and NASCAR Xfinity Series, all Truck races will be split into segments. After the first two intermediate segment finishes, the top 10 drivers will be awarded points. The race finish will air full points as usual. The first two segments have about one quarter of the race laps each, and the final segment has about half of the race laps.

== Schedule ==
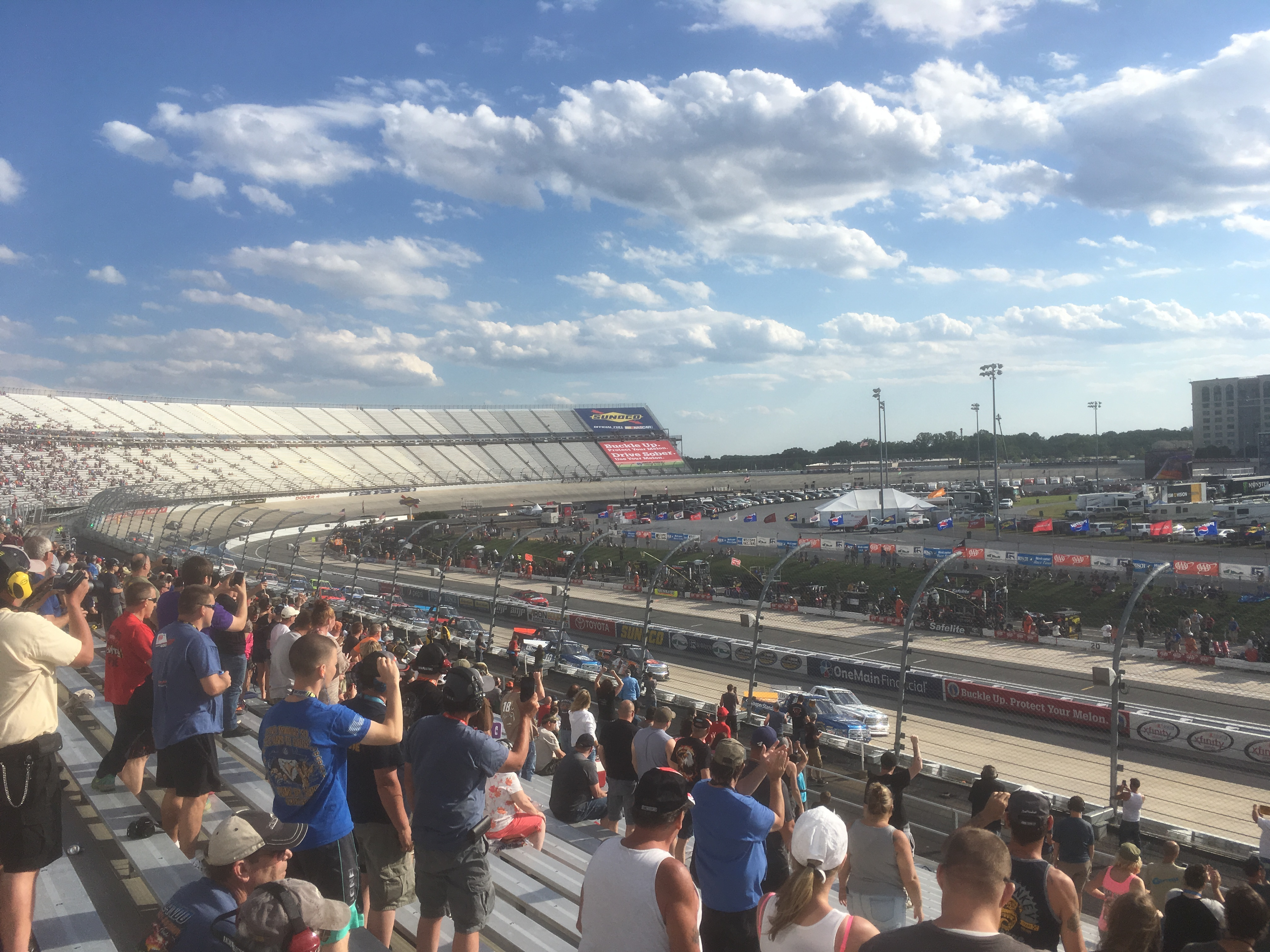
The Bar Harbor 200 at Dover International Speedway in June

The season's schedule comprises 23 races, and was released on May 5, 2016. Fox, FS1, and Fox Business will televise every race in the United States.

No 7	Race	Track	Location	Date	Time	TV
1	NextEra Energy Resources 250	Daytona International Speedway	Daytona Beach, Florida	February 24	7:30 p.m.	FS1
2	Active Pest Control 200	Atlanta Motor Speedway	Hampton, Georgia	March 4	4:30 p.m.	FS1
3	Alpha Energy Solutions 250	Martinsville Speedway	Ridgeway, Virginia	April 1	3:00 p.m.	Fox
4	Toyota Tundra 250	Kansas Speedway	Kansas City, Kansas	May 12	8:30 p.m.	FS1
5	North Carolina Education Lottery 200	Charlotte Motor Speedway	Concord, North Carolina	May 19	8:30 p.m.	FS1
6	Bar Harbor 200	Dover International Speedway	Dover, Delaware	June 2	5:30 p.m.	FS1
7	winstaronlinegaming.com 400	Texas Motor Speedway	Fort Worth, Texas	June 9	8:00 p.m.	FS1
8	Drivin' for Linemen 200	Gateway Motorsports Park	Madison, Illinois	June 17	8:30 p.m.	FS1
9	M&M's 200	Iowa Speedway	Newton, Iowa	June 23	8:30 p.m.	FS1
10	Buckle Up in Your Truck 225	Kentucky Speedway	Sparta, Kentucky	July 6	10:30 p.m.	FS1
11	Eldora Dirt Derby	Eldora Speedway	Allen Township, Darke County, Ohio	July 19	9:00 p.m.	FBN
12	Overton's 150	Pocono Raceway	Long Pond, Pennsylvania	July 29	1:00 p.m.	Fox
13	LTi Printing 200	Michigan International Speedway	Cambridge Township, Michigan	August 12	1:00 p.m.	FS1
14	UNOH 200	Bristol Motor Speedway	Bristol, Tennessee	August 16	10:30 p.m.	FS1
15	Chevrolet Silverado 250	Canadian Tire Motorsport Park	Clarington, Ontario, Canada	September 3	2:30 p.m.	FS1
16	TheHouse.com 225	Chicagoland Speedway	Joliet, Illinois	September 15	8:30 p.m.	FS1
NASCAR Camping World Truck Series Playoffs
Round of 8
17	UNOH 175	New Hampshire Motor Speedway	Loudon, New Hampshire	September 23	1:00 p.m.	FS1
18	Las Vegas 350	Las Vegas Motor Speedway	Las Vegas, Nevada	September 30	8:30 p.m.	FS1
19	Fred's 250	Talladega Superspeedway	Lincoln, Alabama	October 14	1:00 p.m.	Fox
Round of 6
20	Texas Roadhouse 200	Martinsville Speedway	Ridgeway, Virginia	October 28	1:30 p.m.	FS1
21	JAG Metals 350	Texas Motor Speedway	Fort Worth, Texas	November 3	8:30 p.m.	FS1
22	Lucas Oil 150	Phoenix International Raceway	Avondale, Arizona	November 10	8:30 p.m.	FS1
Championship 4
23	Ford EcoBoost 200	Homestead–Miami Speedway	Homestead, Florida	November 17	8:00 p.m.	FS1

== Results and standings ==
=== Race results ===
No.	Race	Pole position	Most laps led	Winning driver	Manufacturer
1	NextEra Energy Resources 250	Kaz Grala	Johnny Sauter	Kaz Grala	Chevrolet
2	Active Pest Control 200	Christopher Bell	Christopher Bell	Christopher Bell	Toyota
3	Alpha Energy Solutions 250	Chase Elliott	Christopher Bell	Chase Elliott	Chevrolet
4	Toyota Tundra 250	Christopher Bell	Kyle Busch	Kyle Busch	Toyota
5	North Carolina Education Lottery 200	Christopher Bell	Kyle Busch	Kyle Busch	Toyota
6	Bar Harbor 200	Chase Briscoe	Ben Rhodes	Johnny Sauter	Chevrolet
7	Winstaronlinegaming.com 400	Noah Gragson	Christopher Bell	Christopher Bell	Toyota
8	Drivin' for Linemen 200	Chase Briscoe	Chase Briscoe	John Hunter Nemechek	Chevrolet
9	M&M's 200	Noah Gragson	Christopher Bell	John Hunter Nemechek	Chevrolet
10	Buckle Up in Your Truck 225	Johnny Sauter	Christopher Bell	Christopher Bell	Toyota
11	Eldora Dirt Derby	Stewart Friesen	Stewart Friesen	Matt Crafton	Toyota
12	Overton's 150	Ben Rhodes	Kyle Busch	Christopher Bell	Toyota
13	LTi Printing 200	Matt Crafton	Kyle Busch	Bubba Wallace	Chevrolet
14	UNOH 200	Kyle Busch	Kyle Busch	Kyle Busch	Toyota
15	Chevrolet Silverado 250	Austin Cindric	Austin Cindric	Austin Cindric	Ford
16	TheHouse.com 225	Ryan Truex	Christopher Bell	Johnny Sauter	Chevrolet
NASCAR Camping World Truck Series Playoffs
Round of 8
17	UNOH 175	Noah Gragson	Christopher Bell	Christopher Bell	Toyota
18	Las Vegas 350	Ryan Truex	Christopher Bell	Ben Rhodes	Toyota
19	Fred's 250	Christopher Bell	Johnny Sauter	Parker Kligerman	Toyota
Round of 6
20	Texas Roadhouse 200	Chase Briscoe	Matt Crafton	Noah Gragson	Toyota
21	JAG Metals 350	Justin Haley	Austin Cindric	Johnny Sauter	Chevrolet
22	Lucas Oil 150	Christopher Bell	Christopher Bell	Johnny Sauter	Chevrolet
Championship 4
23	Ford EcoBoost 200	Chase Briscoe	Chase Briscoe	Chase Briscoe	Ford

=== Drivers' standings ===
(key) Bold – Pole position awarded by time. Italics – Pole position set by final practice results or owner's points. * – Most laps led. ^{1} – Stage 1 winner. ^{2} – Stage 2 winner. ^{1-10} – Regular season top 10 finishers.
. – Eliminated after Round of 8 . – Eliminated after Round of 6

Pos.	Driver	DAY	ATL	MAR	KAN	CLT	DOV	TEX	GTW	IOW	KEN	ELD	POC	MCH	BRI	MSP	CHI	NHA	LVS	TAL	MAR	TEX	PHO	HOM	Pts.	Stage	Bonus
1	Christopher Bell	8	**1***^{12}	3*	**4**	**3**	25	1*^{2}	6	5*^{1}	1*	9	1	2	7	26	3*^{2}	1*^{12}	2*	**2**	8	3^{1}	**8***^{12}	2^{1}	4035	–	48^{1}
2	Johnny Sauter	15*^{12}	3	2^{2}	2	2	1	8^{1}	3	2^{2}	9	23	5	18	6	6	1	9	10	12*^{12}	3^{2}	1	1	3	4034	–	32^{2}
3	Austin Cindric **(R)**	27	21	21	10	13	5	25	11	8	4	10	7	5	9	**1***^{1}	15	8	4	5	10	2*	9	5	4032	–	7^{10}
4	Matt Crafton	14	2	9	16	6	11^{2}	9	4	19	8	1^{1}	6	**6**	2	25	16	6	7	9	2*^{1}	9	21	6	4031	–	15^{4}
NASCAR Camping World Truck Series Playoffs cut-off
Pos.	Driver	DAY	ATL	MAR	KAN	CLT	DOV	TEX	GTW	IOW	KEN	ELD	POC	MCH	BRI	MSP	CHI	NHA	LVS	TAL	MAR	TEX	PHO	HOM	Pts.	Stage	Bonus
5	Ben Rhodes	12	4	20	23	8	4*	5	8	14	27^{1}	30	**2**	11	5	10	6	7	1^{2}	23	9	18	20	19^{2}	2263	84	13^{5}
6	Chase Briscoe **(R)**	3	25	11	5	11	**12**	2	**2***^{2}	7	11	3	9	9	12	7	2	11	3^{1}	22	**19**	4	4	**1***	2248	40	10^{3}
7	Kaz Grala **(R)**	**1**	15	15	8	30	2	10	13	24	24	31	23	12	28	3	9	10	5	29	7	6	5	13	2214	25	5
8	John Hunter Nemechek	4	29	28	3	22	22	21	1^{1}	1	18	5	4	29	3	20	7	20	8	6	30	19	2	15	2206	33	14^{8}
9	Ryan Truex	28	13	10	6	4	10^{1}	4	7	20	23	20	3	4	16	5^{2}	**4**^{1}	2	**12**	28	13	8	19	4	772	184	3^{5}
10	Noah Gragson **(R)**	26	14	4	28	9	9	**7**	9	**6**	5^{2}	7	24	7	15	2	8	**15**	13	14	1	10^{2}	15	18	724	135	7^{9}
11	Grant Enfinger **(R)**	16	8	17	11	7	3	3	5	4	28	4	13	8	4	13	5	4	9	4	12	7	24	8	718	94	0^{7}
12	Justin Haley **(R)**			26	9	17	8	6	10	10	3	8	10	10	11	4	14	13	21	16	11	**5**	14	9	600	78	–
13	Cody Coughlin **(R)**	11	16	19	26	16	16	18	12	12	15	11	8	21	17	21	11	12	6	25	20	16	3	14	511	6	–
14	Stewart Friesen **(R)**	31	19	25	32	23	28	22			12	**2***^{2}	12	13	29			5	23	17	6	14	6	7	422	43	1
15	Austin Wayne Self	2		DNQ	15	12		12		23	22		16	15	24	9	20	14	20	18	29	15	25	17	364	6	–
16	Wendell Chavous **(R)**	19	20	23	31	28	19	20	18	17	19	16	20	17	23		18	18	14	24	21	21		23	348	–	–
17	Jordan Anderson	DNQ	28	31	19	21	24	15	17	15	25		17	23	27	23	21	21	15		24	24	13	21	316	–	–
18	Regan Smith	6	12	12	12	29	7				14				14		12			27	14	13		11	300	2	–
19	Norm Benning	DNQ	DNQ	DNQ	24	26	26	17	22	22	32	13	21	20	31	18	23	19	19	31	27	23	22	25	279	–	–
20	T. J. Bell	DNQ	17	24		14	23	14	15	29	26		14	16	21			16	24				30	16	260	1	–
21	Timothy Peters	17	9	8	13	5		13											11					10	252	42	–
22	Myatt Snider	10						16			16						10		28	3		12		12	227	37	–
23	Austin Hill		18	14		25	27		14		10		11		22			22			16	11	23		226	5	–
24	Josh Reaume							26	19	18	20			19	25		19	17	16	21		20	16	22	223	–	–
25	Jennifer Jo Cobb	DNQ	DNQ		27	27	30	19	30	DNQ	21		18	22	30	28	24	24	18	19	28	22	27	31	220	–	–
26	Parker Kligerman	DNQ	31			10	21				7				8	8				1					184	7	–
27	Todd Gilliland						20		21							11		3			5		7		178	33	–
28	Joe Nemechek	5	24	18					28	31	DNQ		29	30	32	31	31	26	26	30		31	29	29	166	4	–
29	Harrison Burton			13			13			11		15			18						4				162	14	–
30	Tyler Young	23			14			23		30				14			13			10		17			152	–	–
31	Brett Moffitt	22	11	6	7	18																			126	5	–
32	Camden Murphy				30		32		23		30		28	25		22	22	27	17					27	124	–	–
33	Jesse Little						14			9					13								18		110	16	–
34	Todd Peck	18	32		29	32	31	24					19	28		29			29						99	–	–
35	Mike Senica									21			30	27	DNQ	30	32	28	27		DNQ	30	32	30	83	–	–
36	Travis Kvapil	24		29				11	27				26												68	–	–
37	Clay Greenfield	29							24						26					8					61	–	–
38	Ray Ciccarelli											22		26				29				28	26	32	59	–	–
39	Kevin Donahue				21			27	26	28							29								54	–	–
40	Kyle Donahue			16					16	26															53	–	–
41	Jason Hathaway															15							11		52	4	–
42	Matt Mills				17^{†}	24^{†}	17				29		27						25						50	–	–
43	Bayley Currey																				25		10	28	48	–	–
44	Korbin Forrister	20	22									28													45	4	–
45	Bobby Gerhart	21																		11					42	–	–
46	Justin Fontaine												15				17								42	–	–
47	Ted Minor									27							26					25	31		39	–	–
48	Jeffrey Abbey											14									22				38	–	–
49	Landon Huffman														20						17				37	–	–
50	Dalton Sargeant																						17	20	37	–	–
51	Chris Windom											19			DNQ						32			26	34	–	–
52	Bryce Napier			32					20	25															34	–	–
53	Bobby Pierce											6													31	–	–
54	Brian Wong															12									25	–	–
55	Patrick Emerling																	23				26			25	–	–
56	Victor Gonzalez Jr.															16									24	3	–
57	Trey Hutchens									16															21	–	–
58	Ken Schrader											17													20	–	–
59	Bobby Reuse															17									20	–	–
60	Cale Gale																				18				20	1	–
61	Caleb Holman			22								32													20	–	–
62	Donnie Levister			30					25																19	–	–
63	Alex Tagliani															19									18	–	–
64	Mason Diaz																				23				17	3	–
65	Justin Shipley											25													17	5	–
66	Bryan Dauzat	DNQ											22												15	–	–
67	Travis Pastrana																		22						15	–	–
68	Rico Abreu											26													14	3	–
69	Terry Jones	25																							12	–	–
70	Travis Miller				25																				12	–	–
71	Chris Fontaine	DNQ																		26					11	–	–
72	Joe Hudson															27									10	–	–
73	Max Johnston											29													8	–	–
74	Akinori Ogata		30																						7	–	–
	Tim Viens	DNQ																							0	–	–
	Chuck Buchanan Jr.			DNQ																					0	–	–
	J. R. Heffner											Wth													0	–	–
	Dawson Cram																				Wth				0	–	–
Ineligible for Camping World Truck championship points
Pos.	Driver	DAY	ATL	MAR	KAN	CLT	DOV	TEX	GTW	IOW	KEN	ELD	POC	MCH	BRI	MSP	CHI	NHA	LVS	TAL	MAR	TEX	PHO	HOM	Pts.	Stage	Bonus
	Kyle Busch		26		1*^{12}	1*^{12}					6		25*^{12}	3*^{12}	**1***^{12}												
	Chase Elliott		5	**1**^{1}																							
	Brandon Jones					31	6			3	2				10												
	Ty Dillon			5								12									15						
	Alex Bowman		6																								
	Ross Chastain	30	10	7	18	19	15				13																
	Scott Lagasse Jr.	7								13																	
	Austin Dillon		7																								
	Vinnie Miller																			7							
	J. J. Yeley	9	DNQ			15	29			32	17	21			19							29					
	Robby Lyons																						12	24			
	Spencer Boyd	DNQ			20	20														13							
	Spencer Gallagher	13																									
	D. J. Kennington															14				15							
	Mike Harmon		27									18					27			20			28				
	Cody Ware				22	DNQ	18																				
	Tommy Joe Martins	32	23																			32					
	B. J. McLeod										31			24			30										
	Brandon Hightower											24															
	Gary Klutt															24											
	Gray Gaulding																25	25			31	27					
	Jeb Burton																				26						
	Brandon Brown	DNQ		27		DNQ																					
	Sheldon Creed											27															
	Tommy Regan							28	29			DNQ				32	28										
	Bubba Wallace													1^{‡}													
Pos.	Driver	DAY	ATL	MAR	KAN	CLT	DOV	TEX	GTW	IOW	KEN	ELD	POC	MCH	BRI	MSP	CHI	NHA	LVS	TAL	MAR	TEX	PHO	HOM	Pts.	Stage	Bonus
^{†} – Matt Mills started receiving Camping World Truck Series points at Dover.^{‡} Bubba Wallace and MDM Motorsports No. 99 were penalized and the win was 'encumbered' for failing post-race inspection at Michigan. Because of that, he is scored last in the championship.

=== Owners' championship (Top 15) ===
(key) Bold – Pole position awarded by time. Italics – Pole position set by final practice results or rainout. * – Most laps led. ^{1} – Stage 1 winner. ^{2} – Stage 2 winner. ^{1-10} – Owners' regular season top 10 finishers.
. – Eliminated after Round of 8 . – Eliminated after Round of 6

Pos.	No.	Car Owner	DAY	ATL	MAR	KAN	CLT	DOV	TEX	GTW	IOW	KEN	ELD	POC	MCH	BRI	MSP	CHI	NHA	LVS	TAL	MAR	TEX	PHO	HOM	Points	Bonus
1	4	Kyle Busch	8	**1***^{12}	3*	**4**	**3**	25	1*^{2}	6	5*^{1}	1*	9	1	2	7	26	3*^{2}	1*^{12}	2	**2**	8	3^{1}	**8***^{12}	2^{1}	4035	48^{1}
2	21	Maurice J. Gallagher Jr.	15*^{12}	3	2^{2}	2	2	1	8^{1}	3	2^{2}	9	23	5	18	6	6	1	9	10	12*^{12}	3^{2}	1	1	3	4034	37^{2}
3	88	Rhonda Thorson	14	2	9	16	6	11 ^{2}	9	4	19	8	1^{1}	6	**6**	2	25	16	6	7	9	2*^{1}	9	21	6	4031	15^{3}
4	51	Kyle Busch	10	26	13	1*^{12}	1*^{12}	13	16	21	11	16	15	25*^{12}	3*^{12}	18	11	10	3	28	3	4	12	7	12	4025	22^{7}
NASCAR Camping World Truck Series Playoffs cut-off
5	19	Brad Keselowski	27	21	21	10	13	5	25	11	8	4	10	7	5	9	**1***^{1}	15	8	4	5	10	2*	9	5	2278	6
6	33	Maurice J. Gallagher Jr.	**1**	15	15	8	30	2	10	13	24	24	31	23	12	28	3	9	10	5	29	7	6	5	13	2214	5
7	8	Joe Nemechek	4	29	28	3	22	22	21	1^{1}	1	18	5	4	29	3	20	7	20	8	6	30	19	2	15	2204	12^{10}
8	24/23^{1}	Maurice J. Gallagher Jr.	13	5	**1**^{1}	9	17	8	6	10	10	3	8	10	10	11	4	14	13	21	16	11	**5**	14	9	2195	9^{8}
9	29	Brad Keselowski	3	25	11	5	11	**12**	2	**2***^{2}	7	11	3	9	9	12	7	2	11	3^{1}	22	**19**	4	4	**1***	862	2
10	27	Duke Thorson	12	4	20	23	8	4*	5	8	14	27^{1}	30	**2**	11	5	10	6	7	1^{2}	23	9	18	20	19^{2}	794	6
11	16	Shigeaki Hattori	28	13	10	6	4	10 ^{1}	5	7	20	23	20	3	4	16	5^{2}	**4**^{1}	2	**12**	28	13	8	19	4	772	3
12	18	Kyle Busch	26	15	4	28	9	9	**7**	9	**6**	5^{2}	7	24	7	15	2	8	**15**	13	14	1	10^{2}	15	18	724	7
13	98	Mike Curb	16	8	17	11	7	3	3	5	4	28	4	13	8	4	13	5	4	9	4	12	7	24	8	718	–
14	13	Duke Thorson	11	16	19	26	16	16	18	12	12	15	11	8	21	17	21	11	12	6	25	20	16	3	14	511	–
15	02	Randy Young	23	18	14	14	25	27	23	14	13	10	29	11	14	22	19	13	22	11	10	16	11	23	10	459	–
Pos.	No.	Car Owner	DAY	ATL	MAR	KAN	CLT	DOV	TEX	GTW	IOW	KEN	ELD	POC	MCH	BRI	MSP	CHI	NHA	LVS	TAL	MAR	TEX	PHO	HOM	Points	Bonus

=== Manufacturers' Championship ===
Pos	Manufacturer	Wins	Points
1	Toyota	12	856
2	Chevrolet	9	819
3	Ford	2	737

== See also ==
- 2017 Monster Energy NASCAR Cup Series
- 2017 NASCAR Xfinity Series
- 2017 NASCAR K&N Pro Series East
- 2017 NASCAR K&N Pro Series West
- 2017 NASCAR Whelen Modified Tour
- 2017 NASCAR Pinty's Series
- 2017 NASCAR PEAK Mexico Series
- 2017 NASCAR Whelen Euro Series

== Notes ==
- ^1After a dominant win by Chase Elliott at Martinsville in a part-time team (No. 23), GMS Racing switched owner points from No. 24 and No. 23 for number 24 make the owners' playoffs.
