= Mike Senica =

American racing driver and professional wrestler (born 1966)

- Senica at Greenville-Pickens Speedway
- Born: Michael Senica; April 26, 1966 (age 60); Doylestown, Pennsylvania, U.S.

NASCAR FedEx Freight Truck Series career
- 12 races run over 2 years
- 2018 position: 79th
- Best finish: 35th (2017)
- First race: 2017 M&M's 200 (Iowa)
- Last race: 2018 Alpha Energy Solutions 250 (Martinsville)
Wins	Top tens	Poles
0	0	0
- Statistics up to date as of November 25, 2018.

Michael Senica (born April 26, 1966), also known by his ring name Mike Flyte, is an American professional stock car racing driver and professional wrestler.

== Racing career ==
Senica competed in Formula Ford racing in the mid 1990s; he was mentored by former Indy 500 Dennis Vitolo to acquire sponsors to support his racing efforts. He attended the Fast-Track Racing School in 2005 at Charlotte Motor Speedway and earned his ARCA license; he made his debut in the ARCA Racing Series in 2010, driving for Peterson Motorsports at Mansfield Motorsports Speedway, finishing 30th in his debut. He competed in five additional races between 2010 and 2012, posting a best finish of 30th in his debut at Mansfield, and finishing tied for 87th in points in 2012 for his best points finish.

In 2013, Senica moved to the ARCA Truck Series, driving for Team Wilson Driver Development as a teammate to Devin Moran, and Bobby Dale Earnhardt. In August, he joined Mike Harmon Racing as a development driver, planning to make his NASCAR debut in the Camping World Truck Series later that season. Senica's best finish was tenth place at Lake County Speedway on October 13 driving for Spear Motorsports.

In December 2014, Team Stange Racing announced that Senica joined their team in 2015 and competed in the NASCAR K&N Series in select races starting at New Smyrna Speedway during NASCAR's Speedweeks in Daytona Beach. The New Symrna start never happened but Senica did make three starts with the team. Later in the year, he made a start with Spraker Racing, at Richmond. Senica later signed on with LaCross Motorsports. Senica ran in the Super Cup Stock Car Series with LaCross Motorsports.Senica finished 15th in the points in the Super Cup Series. He ran in the ARCA Truck Series at Jennerstown Speedway on September 13 and finished in tenth place for SPEAR Motorsports.

On January 17, 2016, Senica tested for Wayne Peterson Racing at the Daytona International Speedway in the ARCA Series. It was announced on March 8 that Senica has a return set to the ARCA Racing Series at Nashville Speedway with Wayne Peterson Racing. After the Nashville race, he signed with Hixson Motorsports. In ten races, Senica crashed out of one, was parked for being too slow in two others, start and parked in six and ran one full race at Kentucky. He finished 20th in points having competed in 11 of the season's 20 races.

In 2017, Senica continued his part-time ARCA schedule for Hixson Motorsports. Senica announced on May 24 that he would be driving the No. 83 Chevrolet Silverado for Copp Motorsports in the NASCAR Camping World Truck Series at Iowa on June 23. He started last and went on to finish in 21st; however, he was parked for being too slow in the race. Senica then moved over to Norm Benning Racing where he attempted eleven races, failing to qualify for two and start and parking in the other nine, never making it more than eight laps. He attempted six ARCA races for Hixson, finishing 23rd at Daytona, four laps down. He then start and parked for three races and was parked during the Chicagoland race for being too slow, similar to the Truck Series. After failing to qualify for the Winchester race due to ARCA's minimum speed rule, Senica posted on Twitter to criticize the rule change.

In March 2018, Senica was running for TJL Motorsports at Martinsville Speedway in the Truck Series when after eight laps, Truck Series competition director David Hoots radioed for Senica to be parked for going too slow. Senica disregarded the order and stayed on the track, drawing a black flag, indicating that NASCAR would no longer be scoring his truck. A few laps later, he stalled the truck at the backstretch entrance to the garage, causing a caution (that eventually turned into a red flag because of weather conditions that were incoming). The incident led to him, team owner Tracy Lowe and crew chief William Guinade being called to the NASCAR hauler after the race was postponed for weather. The next morning, Senica called out journalist Chris Knight (who had previously posted tweets critical of Senica because of a concern for the other drivers) on Twitter by alleging that Knight was trying to "boost his ratings" and "abusing" free speech while also asking if Knight had ever driven a stock car. Although absent from the NASCAR scene in summer 2018, Senica ran the occasional late model race at Mahoning Speedway, finishing near the rear of the field.

On January 8, 2019, Senica announced a partial Truck slate with Copp Motorsports in 2019, though this was later denied by team owner DJ Copp. It was later revealed that Senica was only eligible to compete at Eldora Speedway.

In 2022 Senica has been running in the Super Cup Stock Car Series, racing for Ashton Motorsports and teaming up with Rob Jones. The pair operates RAM Racing. Senica finished seventh in the Super Cup Stock Car Series driver points for the 2022 season, ninth in 2023, and fourth place in overall driver standings in 2024.

== Wrestling ==
Senica participates in professional wrestling under the stage name Mike Flyte, and was trained by WWE Hall of Famer Afa, the Wild Samoan. He has also worked under the names Padrone, Masked Superstar and The Machine. Currently, he works as the manager for D-Ray 3000 in the International Wrestling Network.

Mike Flyte made his return at a house show on 10/3/2025 in Philadelphia for IJW. Mike Flyte managed Moose, who defeated D-MAC.

== Motorsports career results ==
=== NASCAR ===
(key) (Bold – Pole position awarded by qualifying time. Italics – Pole position earned by points standings or practice time. * – Most laps led.)

==== Camping World Truck Series ====
NASCAR Camping World Truck Series results
Year	Team	No.	Make	1	2	3	4	5	6	7	8	9	10	11	12	13	14	15	16	17	18	19	20	21	22	23	NCWTC	Pts	Ref
2017	Copp Motorsports	83	Chevy	DAY	ATL	MAR	KAN	CLT	DOV	TEX	GTW	IOW; 21	KEN	ELD													35th	83	
2017	Norm Benning Racing	57	Chevy												POC; 30	MCH; 27	BRI; DNQ	MSP; 30	CHI; 32	NHA; 28	LVS; 27	TAL	MAR; DNQ	TEX; 30	PHO; 32	HOM; 30	35th	83	
2018	Jennifer Jo Cobb Racing	0	Chevy	DAY	ATL	LVS; 30																					79th	12	
2018	TJL Motorsports	1	Chevy				MAR; 32	DOV	KAN	CLT	TEX	IOW	GTW	CHI	KEN	ELD	POC	MCH	BRI	MSP	LVS	TAL	MAR	TEX	PHO	HOM	79th	12	

==== K&N Pro Series East ====
NASCAR K&N Pro Series East results
Year	Team	No.	Make	1	2	3	4	5	6	7	8	9	10	11	12	13	14	NKNPSEC	Pts	Ref
2015	Team Stange Racing	47	Chevy	NSM	GRE; 24	BRI	IOW	BGS	LGY	COL; 20	NHA							33rd	79	
2015	Team Stange Racing	45	Chevy									IOW; 21	GLN	MOT	VIR			33rd	79	
2015	Team Stange Racing	37	Toyota													RCH; 32	DOV	33rd	79	

=== ARCA Racing Series ===
(key) (Bold – Pole position awarded by qualifying time. Italics – Pole position earned by points standings or practice time. * – Most laps led.)

ARCA Racing Series results
Year	Team	No.	Make	1	2	3	4	5	6	7	8	9	10	11	12	13	14	15	16	17	18	19	20	ARSC	Pts	Ref
2010	Wayne Peterson Racing	06	Ford	DAY	PBE	SLM	TEX	TAL	TOL	POC	MCH	IOW	MFD; 30	POC	BLN	NJE; 33	ISF	CHI	DSF	TOL				95th	170	
2010	Wayne Peterson Racing	0	Chevy																		SLM; 31	KAN	CAR	95th	170	
2011	Carter 2 Motorsports	04	Dodge	DAY	TAL	SLM	TOL	NJE	CHI	POC	MCH	WIN	BLN	IOW	IRP	POC	ISF	MAD; 32	DSF	SLM	KAN			145th	95	
2011	Hixson Motorsports	29	Chevy																			TOL; DNQ		145th	95	
2012	Hixson Motorsports	28	Chevy	DAY	MOB; DNQ	SLM; 32	TAL	TOL	ELK	POC	MCH	WIN												88th	220	
2012	Hixson Motorsports	95	Chevy										NJE; 32	IOW	CHI									88th	220	
2012	Fast Track Racing	10	Ford													IRP; 35	POC	BLN	ISF	MAD	SLM	DSF	KAN	88th	220	
2014	Carter 2 Motorsports	40	Dodge	DAY	MOB	SLM	TAL	TOL	NJE	POC	MCH	ELK	WIN	CHI	IRP; 27	POC	BLN	ISF	MAD	DSF	SLM	KEN	KAN	134th	95	
2016	Wayne Peterson Racing	0	Ford	DAY	NSH; 32	SLM	TAL	TOL																20th	1330	
2016	Hixson Motorsports	2	Chevy						NJE; 22	POC	MCH													20th	1330	
2016	Hixson Motorsports	64	Chevy									MAD; 19	WIN; 18	IOW; 23	IRP; 29	POC	BLN; 17	ISF; 22	DSF; 24	SLM; 20	CHI	KEN; 20	KAN; 23	20th	1330	
2017	Hixson Motorsports	3	Chevy	DAY; 23	NSH; 29	SLM	TAL	TOL	ELK	POC	MCH	MAD	IOW	IRP; 20		WIN; DNQ	ISF	ROA	DSF	SLM	CHI; 23	KEN	KAN	38th	555	
2017	Hixson Motorsports	31	Chevy												POC; 29									38th	555	

^{*} Season still in progress
^{1} Ineligible for series points
