= TJL Motorsports =

American auto race team

- Owner: Tracy Lowe
- Series: Camping World Truck Series
- Race drivers: Camping World Truck Series; 1. B. J. McLeod, Clay Greenfield, Tommy Regan, Mike Senica
- Manufacturer: Chevrolet
- Opened: 2017

Career
- Debut: 2017 NextEra Energy Resources 250 (Daytona)
- Latest race: 2018 Alpha Energy Solutions 250 (Martinsville)
- Races competed: Total: 25; Camping World Truck Series: 25
- Drivers' Championships: Total: 0 Camping World Truck Series: 0
- Race victories: Total: 0 Camping World Truck Series: 0
- Pole positions: Total: 0 Camping World Truck Series: 0

TJL Motorsports was a NASCAR Camping World Truck Series team. They fielded the No. 1 Chevrolet Silverado for various drivers in the Camping World Truck Series.

== Founding ==
TJL Motorsports' owner is Tracy Lowe, former co-owner of MAKE Motorsports. For the 2017 NASCAR Camping World Truck Series Lowe and Mark Beaver part ways. Beaver renamed the team to Beaver Motorsports and retained control of the No. 50 entry while Lowe took the assets of the former No. 1 team to create TJL Motorsports.

== Truck No. 1 history ==
At the season opening race at Daytona, the team entered with Tim Viens and crew chief Rodney Jobman with sponsorship from Peterson Excavating and Coons Communications. The team failed to qualify. They entered Atlanta with Mike Harmon and crew chief Darwin Peters Jr. Harmon made the race due to owner points and finished in 27th place, 6 laps down. The team came to Martinsville with driver Bryce Napier and driver Mike Harmon serving as the crew chief with sponsorship from ASAP Appliance Services. The team made the race due to owner points for the second straight week. Napier finished in 32nd, completing 3 laps, as the team retired due to an oil leak. At Kansas, Harmon returned as crew chief, but had Jordan Anderson behind the wheel with sponsorship from Fueled by Fans-SponsorJordan.com, a website to help Anderson gain funding for a truck to field. Anderson qualified 24th and finished 19th, 4 laps down. Anderson, Harmon, and sponsorship returned for Charlotte. Anderson qualified 25th and finished 21st, only 1 lap down. At Dover, Harmon, Anderson, and their sponsorship returned. Anderson qualified 26th but had to go to the rear due to unapproved adjustments. The team completed 82 laps before blowing an engine and finishing in 24th. At Texas, Anderson returned, but Mike Harmon was unable to serve as crew chief due to his Xfinity Series priorities. The team had Ryan Fields be the crew chief with sponsorship from Jordan's website. Jordan qualified 19th in a 28 truck field and finished 15th, 4 laps down.

At Martinsville in 2018, the team gained notoriety when driver Mike Senica disobeyed a NASCAR order to park and proceeded to get a black flag, which he disobeyed and then spun on the backstretch trying to find the garage entrance. Senica, Lowe and crew chief William Guinade wound up getting an invitation to NASCAR's competition hauler after the incident, though no further punishments were handed out. The team only ran one more race after Martinsville, failing to qualify at Kansas with Camden Murphy, withdrawing from the Charlotte race and was absent from the NASCAR scene for the rest of 2018. As of 2022 the team has not made another NASCAR start.

=== Truck No. 1 results ===
NASCAR Camping World Truck Series results
Year	Driver	No.	Make	1	2	3	4	5	6	7	8	9	10	11	12	13	14	15	16	17	18	19	20	21	22	23	NCWTC	Pts
2017	Tim Viens	1	Chevy	DAY; DNQ																							23rd	346
2017	Mike Harmon	1	Chevy		ATL; 27																	TAL; 20					23rd	346
2017	Bryce Napier	1	Chevy			MAR; 32																					23rd	346
2017	Jordan Anderson	1	Chevy				KAN; 19	CLT; 21	DOV; 24	TEX; 15	GTW; 17	IOW; 15	KEN; 25		POC; 17	MCH; 23	BRI; 27	MSP; 23	CHI; 21	NHA; 21	LVS; 15		MAR; 24	TEX; 24	PHO; 13	HOM; 21	23rd	346
2017	Brandon Hightower	1	Chevy											ELD; 24													23rd	346
2018	B. J. McLeod	1	Chevy	DAY; DNQ																							52nd	24
2018	Clay Greenfield	1	Chevy		ATL; 28																						52nd	24
2018	Tommy Regan	1	Chevy			LVS; 27																					52nd	24
2018	Mike Senica	1	Chevy				MAR; 32																				52nd	24
2018	Ray Ciccarelli	1	Chevy					DOV; Wth																			52nd	24
2018	Camden Murphy	1	Chevy						KAN; DNQ	CLT	TEX	IOW	GTW	CHI	KEN	ELD	POC	MCH	BRI	MSP	LVS	TAL	MAR	TEX	PHO	HOM	52nd	24
