= 2016 North Carolina Education Lottery 200 =

6th race of the 2016 NASCAR Camping World Truck Series

Race details
- Race 6 of 23 of the 2016 NASCAR Camping World Truck Series
- Date: May 21, 2016
- Official name: 14th Annual North Carolina Education Lottery 200
- Location: Charlotte Motor Speedway, Concord, North Carolina
- Course: Permanent racing facility
- Course length: 1.5 miles (2.4 km)
- Distance: 134 laps, 201 mi (323 km)
- Scheduled distance: 134 laps, 201 mi (323 km)
- Average speed: 141.855 mph (228.293 km/h)

Pole position
Driver	William Byron	Kyle Busch Motorsports
- Grid positions set by competition-based formula

Most laps led
Driver	Matt Crafton	ThorSport Racing
- Laps: 47

Winner
No. 88	Matt Crafton	ThorSport Racing

Television in the United States
- Network: FS1
- Announcers: Vince Welch, Phil Parsons, and Michael Waltrip

Radio in the United States
- Radio: MRN

The 2016 North Carolina Education Lottery 200 was the 6th stock car race of the 2016 NASCAR Camping World Truck Series, and the 14th iteration of the event. The race was originally going be held on Friday, May 20, 2016, but due to inclement weather, it was postponed until Saturday, May 21, in Concord, North Carolina at Charlotte Motor Speedway, a 1.5-mile (2.4 km) permanent tri-oval shaped racetrack. The race took the scheduled 134 laps to complete. Matt Crafton, driving for ThorSport Racing, survived a string of green-flag pit stops, and earned his 13th career NASCAR Camping World Truck Series win, and his second of the season. Crafton also dominated parts of the race, leading 47 laps. To fill out the podium, Kyle Busch, driving for his team, Kyle Busch Motorsports, and Johnny Sauter, driving for GMS Racing, would finish 2nd and 3rd, respectively.

== Background ==
The layout of Charlotte Motor Speedway, the venue where the race was held.

Charlotte Motor Speedway is a motorsport complex located in Concord, North Carolina, 13 mi (21 km) outside Charlotte. The complex features a 1.5 mi (2.4 km) quad oval track that hosts NASCAR racing including the prestigious Coca-Cola 600 on Memorial Day weekend, and the Bank of America Roval 400. The speedway was built in 1959 by Bruton Smith and is considered the home track for NASCAR with many race teams located in the Charlotte area. The track is owned and operated by Speedway Motorsports with Greg Walter as track president.

The 2,000 acres (810 ha) complex also features a state-of-the-art 0.25 mi (0.40 km) drag racing strip, ZMAX Dragway. It is the only all-concrete, four-lane drag strip in the United States and hosts NHRA events. Alongside the drag strip is a state-of-the-art clay oval that hosts dirt racing including the World of Outlaws finals among other popular racing events.

=== Entry list ===
- (R) denotes rookie driver.
- (i) denotes driver who is ineligible for series driver points.

#	Driver	Team	Make	Sponsor
00	Cole Custer (R)	JR Motorsports	Chevrolet	Haas Automation
1	Andy Seuss	FDNY Racing	Chevrolet	FDNY
02	Tyler Young	Young's Motorsports	Chevrolet	Randco, Young's Building Systems
2	Austin Cindric	Brad Keselowski Racing	Ford	Klixel8
4	Christopher Bell (R)	Kyle Busch Motorsports	Toyota	Toyota
05	John Wes Townley	Athenian Motorsports	Chevrolet	Zaxby's
07	Garrett Smithley (i)	SS-Green Light Racing	Chevrolet	HeroBox, Instalco
8	John Hunter Nemechek	NEMCO Motorsports	Chevrolet	Cricket SX3
9	William Byron (R)	Kyle Busch Motorsports	Toyota	Liberty University
10	Jennifer Jo Cobb	Jennifer Jo Cobb Racing	Chevrolet	Driven2Honor.org
11	Matt Tifft (R)	Red Horse Racing	Toyota	Red Horse Racing
13	Cameron Hayley	ThorSport Racing	Toyota	Cabinets by Hayley
17	Timothy Peters	Red Horse Racing	Toyota	Red Horse Racing
18	Kyle Busch (i)	Kyle Busch Motorsports	Toyota	SiriusXM
19	Daniel Hemric	Brad Keselowski Racing	Ford	DrawTite
20	Austin Hill	Austin Hill Racing	Ford	A+D Welding
21	Johnny Sauter	GMS Racing	Chevrolet	Water Pulse
22	Austin Wayne Self (R)	AM Racing	Toyota	AM Technical Solutions
23	Spencer Gallagher	GMS Racing	Chevrolet	Allegiant Travel Company
29	Tyler Reddick	Brad Keselowski Racing	Ford	Cooper Standard Careers for Veterans
30	Jesse Little	Rette Jones Racing	Toyota	Carolina Nut Co.
33	Ben Kennedy	GMS Racing	Chevrolet	Jacob Companies
41	Ben Rhodes (R)	ThorSport Racing	Toyota	USA Cares
44	Tommy Joe Martins	Martins Motorsports	Chevrolet	Diamond Gusset Jeans
49	Timmy Hill	Premium Motorsports	Chevrolet	Testoral
50	Travis Kvapil	MAKE Motorsports	Chevrolet	GasBuddy
51	Daniel Suárez (i)	Kyle Busch Motorsports	Toyota	Arris
63	Bobby Pierce	MB Motorsports	Chevrolet	Mittler Bros. Machine & Tool
66	Jordan Anderson	Bolen Motorsports	Chevrolet	Columbia SC - Famously Hot
71	Brandon Jones (i)	Ranier Racing with MDM	Chevrolet	Hope For The Warriors
75	Caleb Holman	Henderson Motorsports	Toyota	Food Country USA, Lay's
81	Ryan Truex	Hattori Racing Enterprises	Toyota	SeaWatch
86	Brandon Brown	Brandonbilt Motorsports	Chevrolet	Jeff Gordon Children's Foundation
88	Matt Crafton	ThorSport Racing	Toyota	Damp Rid, Menards
92	Parker Kligerman	RBR Enterprises	Ford	Black's Tire Service, Advance Auto Parts
98	Rico Abreu (R)	ThorSport Racing	Toyota	Safelite, Curb Records
Official entry list

== Practice ==
The first and only practice session was held on Thursday, May 19, at 12:30 pm EST, and would last for 1 hour. William Byron, driving for Kyle Busch Motorsports, would set the fastest time in the session, with a lap of 29.321, and an average speed of 184.168 mph (296.390 km/h). Because of persistent rain, the second and final practice sessions would be cancelled.

Pos.	#	Driver	Team	Make	Time	Speed
1	9	William Byron (R)	Kyle Busch Motorsports	Toyota	29.321	184.168
2	23	Spencer Gallagher	GMS Racing	Chevrolet	29.355	183.955
3	21	Johnny Sauter	GMS Racing	Chevrolet	29.457	183.318
Full practice results

== Qualifying ==
Qualifying was originally going to be held on Friday, May 20, at 5:30 pm EST. Since Charlotte Motor Speedway is at least 1.5 miles (2.4 km) in length, the qualifying system was a single car, single lap, two round system where in the first round, everyone would set a time to determine positions 13–32. Then, the fastest 12 qualifiers would move on to the second round to determine positions 1–12.

Qualifying would be cancelled due to inclement weather. The starting lineup would be determined by speeds during practice. As a result, William Byron, driving for Kyle Busch Motorsports would earn the pole.

Austin Cindric, Caleb Holman, Jesse Little, and Austin Hill would fail to qualify.

=== Starting lineup ===
Pos.	#	Driver	Team	Make
1	9	William Byron (R)	Kyle Busch Motorsports	Toyota
2	23	Spencer Gallagher	GMS Racing	Chevrolet
3	33	Ben Kennedy	GMS Racing	Chevrolet
4	21	Johnny Sauter	GMS Racing	Chevrolet
5	18	Kyle Busch (i)	Kyle Busch Motorsports	Toyota
6	29	Tyler Reddick	Brad Keselowski Racing	Ford
7	51	Daniel Suárez (i)	Kyle Busch Motorsports	Toyota
8	19	Daniel Hemric	Brad Keselowski Racing	Ford
9	11	Matt Tifft (R)	Red Horse Racing	Toyota
10	98	Rico Abreu (R)	ThorSport Racing	Toyota
11	05	John Wes Townley	Athenian Motorsports	Chevrolet
12	41	Ben Rhodes (R)	ThorSport Racing	Toyota
13	92	Parker Kligerman	RBR Enterprises	Ford
14	71	Brandon Jones (i)	Ranier Racing with MDM	Chevrolet
15	4	Christopher Bell (R)	Kyle Busch Motorsports	Toyota
16	00	Cole Custer (R)	JR Motorsports	Chevrolet
17	88	Matt Crafton	ThorSport Racing	Toyota
18	13	Cameron Hayley	ThorSport Racing	Toyota
19	86	Brandon Brown	Brandonbilt Motorsports	Chevrolet
20	17	Timothy Peters	Red Horse Racing	Toyota
21	8	John Hunter Nemechek	NEMCO Motorsports	Chevrolet
22	81	Ryan Truex	Hattori Racing Enterprises	Toyota
23	02	Tyler Young	Young's Motorsports	Chevrolet
24	22	Austin Wayne Self (R)	AM Racing	Toyota
25	66	Jordan Anderson	Bolen Motorsports	Chevrolet
26	63	Bobby Pierce	MB Motorsports	Chevrolet
27	50	Travis Kvapil	MAKE Motorsports	Chevrolet
Qualified by owner's points
28	44	Tommy Joe Martins	Martins Motorsports	Chevrolet
29	07	Garrett Smithley (i)	SS-Green Light Racing	Chevrolet
30	49	Timmy Hill	Premium Motorsports	Chevrolet
31	10	Jennifer Jo Cobb	Jennifer Jo Cobb Racing	Chevrolet
32	1	Andy Seuss	FDNY Racing	Chevrolet
Failed to qualify
33	2	Austin Cindric	Brad Keselowski Racing	Ford
34	75	Caleb Holman	Henderson Motorsports	Toyota
35	30	Jesse Little	Rette Jones Racing	Toyota
36	20	Austin Hill	Austin Hill Racing	Ford
Official starting lineup

== Race results ==
Fin	St	#	Driver	Team	Make	Laps	Led	Status	Pts
1	17	88	Matt Crafton	ThorSport Racing	Toyota	134	47	Running	37
2	5	18	Kyle Busch (i)	Kyle Busch Motorsports	Toyota	134	27	Running	0
3	4	21	Johnny Sauter	GMS Racing	Chevrolet	134	1	Running	31
4	6	29	Tyler Reddick	Brad Keselowski Racing	Ford	134	0	Running	29
5	9	11	Matt Tifft (R)	Red Horse Racing	Toyota	134	0	Running	28
6	2	23	Spencer Gallagher	GMS Racing	Chevrolet	134	0	Running	27
7	20	17	Timothy Peters	Red Horse Racing	Toyota	134	11	Running	27
8	15	4	Christopher Bell (R)	Kyle Busch Motorsports	Toyota	134	0	Running	25
9	8	19	Daniel Hemric	Brad Keselowski Racing	Ford	134	15	Running	25
10	1	9	William Byron (R)	Kyle Busch Motorsports	Toyota	134	25	Running	24
11	14	71	Brandon Jones (i)	Ranier Racing with MDM	Chevrolet	134	0	Running	0
12	21	8	John Hunter Nemechek	NEMCO Motorsports	Chevrolet	134	0	Running	21
13	16	00	Cole Custer (R)	JR Motorsports	Chevrolet	134	0	Running	20
14	3	33	Ben Kennedy	GMS Racing	Chevrolet	134	0	Running	19
15	18	13	Cameron Hayley	ThorSport Racing	Toyota	134	0	Running	18
16	11	05	John Wes Townley	Athenian Motorsports	Chevrolet	134	0	Running	17
17	12	41	Ben Rhodes (R)	ThorSport Racing	Toyota	134	0	Running	16
18	13	92	Parker Kligerman	RBR Enterprises	Ford	133	0	Running	15
19	23	02	Tyler Young	Young's Motorsports	Chevrolet	133	0	Running	14
20	10	98	Rico Abreu (R)	ThorSport Racing	Toyota	133	1	Running	14
21	24	22	Austin Wayne Self (R)	AM Racing	Toyota	133	0	Running	12
22	22	81	Ryan Truex	Hattori Racing Enterprises	Toyota	133	0	Running	11
23	7	51	Daniel Suárez (i)	Kyle Busch Motorsports	Toyota	132	6	Running	0
24	25	66	Jordan Anderson	Bolen Motorsports	Chevrolet	132	0	Running	9
25	28	44	Tommy Joe Martins	Martins Motorsports	Chevrolet	132	1	Running	9
26	19	86	Brandon Brown	Brandonbilt Motorsports	Chevrolet	132	0	Running	7
27	26	63	Bobby Pierce	MB Motorsports	Chevrolet	130	0	Running	6
28	31	10	Jennifer Jo Cobb	Jennifer Jo Cobb Racing	Chevrolet	128	0	Running	5
29	29	07	Garrett Smithley (i)	SS-Green Light Racing	Chevrolet	111	0	Running	0
30	27	50	Travis Kvapil	MAKE Motorsports	Chevrolet	106	0	Running	3
31	30	49	Timmy Hill	Premium Motorsports	Chevrolet	82	0	Suspension	2
32	32	1	Andy Seuss	FDNY Racing	Chevrolet	20	0	Accident	1
Official race results

== Standings after the race ==
Drivers' Championship standings

	Pos	Driver	Points
	1	Matt Crafton	161
	2	Timothy Peters	149 (−12)
	3	Daniel Hemric	144 (−17)
1	4	Spencer Gallagher	139 (−22)
1	5	William Byron	135 (−26)
2	6	Ryan Truex	129 (−32)
	7	John Hunter Nemechek	127 (−34)
2	8	Tyler Reddick	125 (−36)
Official driver's standings

- Note: Only the first 8 positions are included for the driver standings.

Previous race: 2016 Jacob Companies 200	NASCAR Camping World Truck Series; 2016 season	Next race: 2016 Rattlesnake 400
