= 2016 Rattlesnake 400 =

7th race of the 2016 NASCAR Camping World Truck Series

Race details
- Race 7 of 23 of the 2016 NASCAR Camping World Truck Series
- Date: June 10, 2016
- Official name: 20th Annual Rattlesnake 400
- Location: Texas Motor Speedway, Fort Worth, Texas
- Course: Permanent racing facility
- Course length: 1.5 miles (2.4 km)
- Distance: 167 laps, 250.5 mi (403.1 km)
- Scheduled distance: 167 laps, 250.5 mi (403.1 km)
- Average speed: 134.919 mph (217.131 km/h)

Pole position
Driver	Johnny Sauter	GMS Racing
- Time: 29.996

Most laps led
Driver	Matt Crafton	ThorSport Racing
- Laps: 133

Winner
No. 9	William Byron	Kyle Busch Motorsports

Television in the United States
- Network: FS1
- Announcers: Vince Welch, Phil Parsons, and Michael Waltrip

Radio in the United States
- Radio: MRN

The 2016 Rattlesnake 400 was the 7th stock car race of the 2016 NASCAR Camping World Truck Series, and the 20th iteration of the event. The race was held on Friday, June 10, 2016, in Fort Worth, Texas, at Texas Motor Speedway, a 1.5-mile (2.4 km) permanent tri-oval shaped racetrack. The race took the scheduled 167 laps to complete. In an exciting battle for the win, William Byron, driving for Kyle Busch Motorsports, would pass Matt Crafton for the lead with 5 laps to go, and hold off the rest of the field to earn his second career NASCAR Camping World Truck Series win. Crafton dominated the entire race, leading 133 of 167 laps. To fill out the podium, Johnny Sauter, driving for GMS Racing, would finish in 3rd, respectively.

== Background ==
The layout of Texas Motor Speedway, the venue where the race was held.

Texas Motor Speedway is a speedway located in the northernmost portion of the U.S. city of Fort Worth, Texas – the portion located in Denton County, Texas. The reconfigured track measures 1.500 mi (2.414 km) with banked 20° in turns 1 and 2 and banked 24° in turns 3 and 4. Texas Motor Speedway is a quad-oval design, where the front straightaway juts outward slightly. The track layout is similar to Atlanta Motor Speedway and Charlotte Motor Speedway. The track is owned by Speedway Motorsports, Inc. Nicknamed “The Great American Speedway“ the racetrack facility is one of the largest motorsports venues in the world capable of hosting crowds in excess of 200,000 spectators.

=== Entry list ===
- (R) denotes rookie driver.
- (i) denotes driver who is ineligible for series driver points.

#	Driver	Team	Make	Sponsor
00	Cole Custer (R)	JR Motorsports	Chevrolet	Haas Automation
1	Ryan Ellis (i)	MAKE Motorsports	Chevrolet	CorvetteParts.net, Fuzzy's Taco Shop
02	Tyler Young	Young's Motorsports	Chevrolet	Randco, Young's Building Systems
4	Christopher Bell (R)	Kyle Busch Motorsports	Toyota	JBL
05	John Wes Townley	Athenian Motorsports	Chevrolet	Jive Communications, Zaxby's
6	Norm Benning	Norm Benning Racing	Chevrolet	Norm Benning Racing
07	Ryan Lynch	SS-Green Light Racing	Chevrolet	BlankHood.com
8	John Hunter Nemechek	NEMCO Motorsports	Chevrolet	Fire Alarm Services
9	William Byron (R)	Kyle Busch Motorsports	Toyota	Liberty University
10	Jennifer Jo Cobb	Jennifer Jo Cobb Racing	Chevrolet	Grimes Irrigation & Construction
11	Germán Quiroga	Red Horse Racing	Toyota	Red Horse Racing
13	Cameron Hayley	ThorSport Racing	Toyota	Cabinets by Hayley
17	Timothy Peters	Red Horse Racing	Toyota	Red Horse Racing
19	Daniel Hemric	Brad Keselowski Racing	Ford	DrawTite
20	Austin Hill	Austin Hill Racing	Ford	A+D Welding
21	Johnny Sauter	GMS Racing	Chevrolet	Smokey Mountain Herbal Snuff
22	Austin Wayne Self (R)	AM Racing	Toyota	AM Technical Solutions
23	Spencer Gallagher	GMS Racing	Chevrolet	Allegiant Travel Company
29	Tyler Reddick	Brad Keselowski Racing	Ford	Cooper-Standard Automotive
33	Ben Kennedy	GMS Racing	Chevrolet	Jacob Companies
41	Ben Rhodes (R)	ThorSport Racing	Toyota	Alpha Energy Solutions
44	Tommy Joe Martins	Martins Motorsports	Chevrolet	Diamond Gusset Jeans
49	Wayne Edwards	Premium Motorsports	Chevrolet	Pro 1 Automotive
50	Travis Kvapil	MAKE Motorsports	Chevrolet	GasBuddy
51	Cody Coughlin (R)	Kyle Busch Motorsports	Toyota	Jegs High Performance, Racers Choice
63	Mike Bliss	MB Motorsports	Chevrolet	MB Motorsports
66	Jordan Anderson	Bolen Motorsports	Chevrolet	Rusty's Off-Road
71	Carlos Contreras	Contreras Motorsports	Chevrolet	American Club
75	Caleb Holman	Henderson Motorsports	Toyota	Food Country USA, Downy Unstoppables
81	Jesse Little	Rette Jones Racing	Toyota	Carolina Nut Co.
86	Tim Viens	Mike Harmon Racing	Chevrolet	RaceDaySponsor.com
88	Matt Crafton	ThorSport Racing	Toyota	Ideal Door, Menards
92	Parker Kligerman	RBR Enterprises	Ford	Black's Tire Service, Advance Auto Parts
98	Rico Abreu (R)	ThorSport Racing	Toyota	Safelite, Curb Records
Official entry list

== Track schedule change ==
In the early morning of June 9, a plane carrying NASCAR officials and representatives was forced to land shortly after taking off at the Concord Regional Airport, due to mechanical issues. Because of this, the truck series garage would postpone its opening until 3:30 pm CST, the time in which the first practice session would take place. Due to the schedule change, one of the three practice sessions would be cancelled, and the rest of the two would be postponed at a later time.

== Practice ==
=== First practice ===
The first practice session was held on Thursday, June 9, at 6:00 pm CST, and would last for 45 minutes. Matt Crafton, driving for ThorSport Racing, would set the fastest time in the session, with a lap of 30.176, and an average speed of 178.950 mph (287.992 km/h).

Pos.	#	Driver	Team	Make	Time	Speed
1	88	Matt Crafton	ThorSport Racing	Toyota	30.176	178.950
2	17	Timothy Peters	Red Horse Racing	Toyota	30.243	178.554
3	05	John Wes Townley	Athenian Motorsports	Chevrolet	30.267	178.412
Full first practice results

=== Final practice ===
The final practice session was held on Thursday, June 9, at 7:30 pm CST, and would last for 1 hour and 30 minutes. John Wes Townley, driving for his family team, Athenian Motorsports, would set the fastest time in the session, with a lap of 30.097, and an average speed of 179.420 mph (288.749 km/h).

Pos.	#	Driver	Team	Make	Time	Speed
1	05	John Wes Townley	Athenian Motorsports	Chevrolet	30.097	179.420
2	9	William Byron (R)	Kyle Busch Motorsports	Toyota	30.176	178.950
3	23	Spencer Gallagher	GMS Racing	Chevrolet	30.192	178.855
Full final practice results

== Qualifying ==
Qualifying was held on Friday, June 10, at 5:00 pm CST. Since Texas Motor Speedway is at least 1.5 miles (2.4 km) in length, the qualifying system was a single car, single lap, two round system where in the first round, everyone would set a time to determine positions 13–32. Then, the fastest 12 qualifiers would move on to the second round to determine positions 1–12.

Johnny Sauter, driving for GMS Racing, would score the pole for the race, with a lap of 29.996, and an average speed of 180.024 mph (289.721 km/h) in the second round.

Norm Benning and Jennifer Jo Cobb would fail to qualify.

=== Full qualifying results ===
Pos.	#	Driver	Team	Make	Time (R1)	Speed (R1)	Time (R2)	Speed (R2)
1	21	Johnny Sauter	GMS Racing	Chevrolet	29.978	180.132	29.996	180.024
2	11	Germán Quiroga	Red Horse Racing	Toyota	30.052	179.689	30.018	179.892
3	19	Daniel Hemric	Brad Keselowski Racing	Ford	30.021	179.874	30.022	179.868
4	88	Matt Crafton	ThorSport Racing	Toyota	29.902	180.590	30.025	179.850
5	29	Tyler Reddick	Brad Keselowski Racing	Ford	30.060	179.641	30.050	179.700
6	9	William Byron (R)	Kyle Busch Motorsports	Toyota	29.960	180.240	30.068	179.593
7	05	John Wes Townley	Athenian Motorsports	Chevrolet	29.957	180.258	30.072	179.569
8	17	Timothy Peters	Red Horse Racing	Toyota	30.022	179.868	30.096	179.426
9	4	Christopher Bell (R)	Kyle Busch Motorsports	Toyota	30.049	179.706	30.114	179.319
10	23	Spencer Gallagher	GMS Racing	Chevrolet	30.158	179.057	30.192	178.855
11	13	Cameron Hayley	ThorSport Racing	Toyota	30.128	179.235	30.218	178.701
12	41	Ben Rhodes (R)	ThorSport Racing	Toyota	30.165	179.015	30.255	178.483
Eliminated in Round 1
13	98	Rico Abreu (R)	ThorSport Racing	Toyota	30.218	178.701	–	–
14	51	Cody Coughlin (R)	Kyle Busch Motorsports	Toyota	30.236	178.595	–	–
15	33	Ben Kennedy	GMS Racing	Chevrolet	30.262	178.442	–	–
16	00	Cole Custer (R)	JR Motorsports	Chevrolet	30.273	178.377	–	–
17	66	Jordan Anderson	Bolen Motorsports	Chevrolet	30.350	177.924	–	–
18	22	Austin Wayne Self (R)	AM Racing	Toyota	30.389	177.696	–	–
19	02	Tyler Young	Young's Motorsports	Chevrolet	30.393	177.672	–	–
20	75	Caleb Holman	Henderson Motorsports	Toyota	30.413	177.556	–	–
21	81	Jesse Little	Rette Jones Racing	Toyota	30.421	177.509	–	–
22	92	Parker Kligerman	RBR Enterprises	Ford	30.460	177.282	–	–
23	8	John Hunter Nemechek	NEMCO Motorsports	Chevrolet	30.559	176.707	–	–
24	44	Tommy Joe Martins	Martins Motorsports	Chevrolet	30.588	176.540	–	–
25	50	Travis Kvapil	MAKE Motorsports	Chevrolet	30.741	175.661	–	–
26	63	Mike Bliss	MB Motorsports	Chevrolet	30.802	175.313	–	–
27	20	Austin Hill	Austin Hill Racing	Ford	30.838	175.109	–	–
Qualified by owner's points
28	07	Ryan Lynch	SS-Green Light Racing	Chevrolet	30.998	174.205	–	–
29	49	Wayne Edwards	Premium Motorsports	Chevrolet	31.256	172.767	–	–
30	71	Carlos Contreras	Contreras Motorsports	Chevrolet	31.806	169.779	–	–
31	1	Ryan Ellis (i)	MAKE Motorsports	Chevrolet	32.070	168.382	–	–
32	86	Tim Viens	Mike Harmon Racing	Chevrolet	32.176	167.827	–	–
Failed to qualify
33	6	Norm Benning	Norm Benning Racing	Chevrolet	30.854	175.018	–	–
34	10	Jennifer Jo Cobb	Jennifer Jo Cobb Racing	Chevrolet	31.223	172.949	–	–
Official qualifying results
Official starting lineup

== Race results ==
Fin	St	#	Driver	Team	Make	Laps	Led	Status	Pts
1	6	9	William Byron (R)	Kyle Busch Motorsports	Toyota	167	6	Running	36
2	4	88	Matt Crafton	ThorSport Racing	Toyota	167	133	Running	33
3	1	21	Johnny Sauter	GMS Racing	Chevrolet	167	9	Running	31
4	15	33	Ben Kennedy	GMS Racing	Chevrolet	167	0	Running	29
5	5	29	Tyler Reddick	Brad Keselowski Racing	Ford	167	0	Running	28
6	8	17	Timothy Peters	Red Horse Racing	Toyota	167	0	Running	27
7	23	8	John Hunter Nemechek	NEMCO Motorsports	Chevrolet	167	0	Running	26
8	2	11	Germán Quiroga	Red Horse Racing	Toyota	167	0	Running	25
9	13	98	Rico Abreu (R)	ThorSport Racing	Toyota	167	0	Running	24
10	3	19	Daniel Hemric	Brad Keselowski Racing	Ford	167	19	Running	24
11	12	41	Ben Rhodes (R)	ThorSport Racing	Toyota	167	0	Running	22
12	14	51	Cody Coughlin (R)	Kyle Busch Motorsports	Toyota	167	0	Running	21
13	18	22	Austin Wayne Self (R)	AM Racing	Toyota	167	0	Running	20
14	16	00	Cole Custer (R)	JR Motorsports	Chevrolet	167	0	Running	19
15	27	20	Austin Hill	Austin Hill Racing	Ford	167	0	Running	18
16	20	75	Caleb Holman	Henderson Motorsports	Toyota	166	0	Running	17
17	7	05	John Wes Townley	Athenian Motorsports	Chevrolet	166	0	Running	16
18	11	13	Cameron Hayley	ThorSport Racing	Toyota	165	0	Running	15
19	21	81	Jesse Little	Rette Jones Racing	Toyota	165	0	Running	14
20	22	92	Parker Kligerman	RBR Enterprises	Ford	164	0	Running	13
21	19	02	Tyler Young	Young's Motorsports	Chevrolet	164	0	Running	12
22	17	66	Jordan Anderson	Bolen Motorsports	Chevrolet	164	0	Running	11
23	29	49	Wayne Edwards	Premium Motorsports	Chevrolet	164	0	Running	10
24	25	50	Travis Kvapil	MAKE Motorsports	Chevrolet	163	0	Running	9
25	24	44	Tommy Joe Martins	Martins Motorsports	Chevrolet	160	0	Running	8
26	28	07	Ryan Lynch	SS-Green Light Racing	Chevrolet	158	0	Running	7
27	10	23	Spencer Gallagher	GMS Racing	Chevrolet	153	0	Running	6
28	26	63	Mike Bliss	MB Motorsports	Chevrolet	92	0	Accident	5
29	32	86	Tim Viens	Mike Harmon Racing	Chevrolet	56	0	Vibration	4
30	31	1	Ryan Ellis (i)	MAKE Motorsports	Chevrolet	30	0	Suspension	0
31	30	71	Carlos Contreras	Contreras Motorsports	Chevrolet	4	0	Engine	2
32	9	4	Christopher Bell (R)	Kyle Busch Motorsports	Toyota	0	0	Engine	1
Official race results

== Standings after the race ==
Drivers' Championship standings

	Pos	Driver	Points
	1	Matt Crafton	194
	2	Timothy Peters	176 (−18)
2	3	William Byron	171 (−23)
1	4	Daniel Hemric	168 (−26)
2	5	John Hunter Nemechek	153 (−41)
2	6	Tyler Reddick	153 (−41)
3	7	Johnny Sauter	151 (−43)
4	8	Spencer Gallagher	145 (−49)
Official driver's standings

- Note: Only the first 8 positions are included for the driver standings.

Previous race: 2016 North Carolina Education Lottery 200	NASCAR Camping World Truck Series; 2016 season	Next race: 2016 Speediatrics 200
