= 2016 Toyota Tundra 250 =

4th race of the 2016 NASCAR Camping World Truck Series

Race details
- Race 4 of 23 of the 2016 NASCAR Camping World Truck Series
- Date: May 6, 2016
- Official name: 16th Annual Toyota Tundra 250
- Location: Kansas Speedway, Kansas City, Kansas
- Course: Permanent racing facility
- Course length: 1.5 miles (2.4 km)
- Distance: 170 laps, 255 mi (410.3 km)
- Scheduled distance: 167 laps, 250.5 mi (403.1 km)
- Average speed: 108.511 miles per hour (174.632 km/h)

Pole position
Driver	John Wes Townley	Athenian Motorsports
- Time: 30.465

Most laps led
Driver	Matt Crafton	ThorSport Racing
- Laps: 57

Winner
No. 9	William Byron	Kyle Busch Motorsports

Television in the United States
- Network: FS1
- Announcers: Vince Welch, Phil Parsons, and Michael Waltrip

Radio in the United States
- Radio: MRN

The 2016 Toyota Tundra 250 was the 4th stock car race of the 2016 NASCAR Camping World Truck Series, and the 16th iteration of the event. The race was held on Friday, May 6, 2016, in Kansas City, Kansas at Kansas Speedway, a 1.5-mile (2.4 km) permanent tri-oval shaped racetrack. The race was increased from 167 laps to 170 laps, due to a NASCAR overtime finish. In a wild finish, William Byron, driving for Kyle Busch Motorsports, would take the upset win, after the leaders of Johnny Sauter and Ben Rhodes wrecked on the final lap. This was Byron's first career NASCAR Camping World Truck Series win. To fill out the podium, Matt Crafton, driving for ThorSport Racing, and Daniel Hemric, driving for Brad Keselowski Racing, would finish 2nd and 3rd, respectively.

== Background ==
The layout of Kansas Speedway, the venue where the race was held.

Kansas Speedway is a 1.5-mile (2.4 km) tri-oval race track in the Village West area near Kansas City, Kansas, United States. It was built in 2001 and it currently hosts two annual NASCAR race weekends. The IndyCar Series also held races at the venue until 2011. The speedway is owned and operated by NASCAR.

=== Entry list ===
- (R) denotes rookie driver.
- (i) denotes driver who is ineligible for series driver points.

#	Driver	Team	Make	Sponsor
00	Cole Custer (R)	JR Motorsports	Chevrolet	Haas Automation
1	Ryan Ellis (i)	MAKE Motorsports	Chevrolet	CorvetteParts.net, ZAK Products
02	Tyler Young	Young's Motorsports	Chevrolet	Interlock Tech Solutions, Randco
4	Christopher Bell (R)	Kyle Busch Motorsports	Toyota	JBL
05	John Wes Townley	Athenian Motorsports	Chevrolet	Jive Communications
6	Norm Benning	Norm Benning Racing	Chevrolet	Norm Benning Racing
07	B. J. McLeod (i)	SS-Green Light Racing	Chevrolet	SS-Green Light Racing
8	John Hunter Nemechek	NEMCO Motorsports	Chevrolet	Andy's Frozen Custard
9	William Byron (R)	Kyle Busch Motorsports	Toyota	Liberty University
10	Jennifer Jo Cobb	Jennifer Jo Cobb Racing	Chevrolet	Mark One Electric
11	Matt Tifft (R)	Red Horse Racing	Toyota	Red Horse Racing
13	Cameron Hayley	ThorSport Racing	Toyota	Cabinets by Hayley
17	Timothy Peters	Red Horse Racing	Toyota	Red Horse Racing
19	Daniel Hemric	Brad Keselowski Racing	Ford	Oakmont Management Group
21	Johnny Sauter	GMS Racing	Chevrolet	Allegiant Air
22	Austin Wayne Self (R)	AM Racing	Toyota	AM Technical Solutions
23	Spencer Gallagher	GMS Racing	Chevrolet	Alamo Rent a Car
24	Clint Bowyer (i)	GMS Racing	Chevrolet	Georgia Boot, 5-hour Energy, Visine
29	Tyler Reddick	Brad Keselowski Racing	Ford	Cooper-Standard Automotive
33	Ben Kennedy	GMS Racing	Chevrolet	Weber Inc.
41	Ben Rhodes (R)	ThorSport Racing	Toyota	Operation BBQ Relief
44	Tommy Joe Martins	Martins Motorsports	Chevrolet	Diamond Gusset Jeans
49	Timmy Hill	Premium Motorsports	Chevrolet	Premium Motorsports
50	Travis Kvapil	MAKE Motorsports	Chevrolet	GasBuddy
51	Cody Coughlin (R)	Kyle Busch Motorsports	Toyota	Jegs High Performance
63	Bobby Pierce	MB Motorsports	Chevrolet	Champion Oil, Vatterott College
66	Jordan Anderson	Bolen Motorsports	Chevrolet	DoodyCalls, Telco Connect
71	Mike Bliss	Contreras Motorsports	Chevrolet	American Club
74	Mike Harmon (i)	Mike Harmon Racing	Chevrolet	RaceDaySponsor.com
81	Ryan Truex	Hattori Racing Enterprises	Toyota	Aquastar
86	Brandon Brown	Brandonbilt Motorsports	Chevrolet	Coastal Carolina University
88	Matt Crafton	ThorSport Racing	Toyota	Ideal Door, Menards
92	Parker Kligerman	RBR Enterprises	Ford	Black's Tire Service, Advance Auto Parts
98	Rico Abreu (R)	ThorSport Racing	Toyota	Safelite, Curb Records
Official entry list

== Practice ==
=== First practice ===
The first practice session was held on Thursday, May 5, at 1:30 pm CST, and would last for 55 minutes. Tyler Reddick, driving for Brad Keselowski Racing, would set the fastest time in the session, with a lap of 30.658, and an average speed of 176.137 mph (283.465 km/h).

Pos.	#	Driver	Team	Make	Time	Speed
1	29	Tyler Reddick	Brad Keselowski Racing	Ford	30.658	176.137
2	88	Matt Crafton	ThorSport Racing	Toyota	30.686	175.976
3	11	Matt Tifft (R)	Red Horse Racing	Toyota	30.762	175.541
Full first practice results

=== Second practice ===
The second practice session was held on Thursday, May 5, at 3:30 pm EST, and would last for 55 minutes. William Byron, driving for Kyle Busch Motorsports, would set the fastest time in the session, with a lap of 30.569, and an average speed of 176.650 mph (284.291 km/h).

Pos.	#	Driver	Team	Make	Time	Speed
1	9	William Byron (R)	Kyle Busch Motorsports	Toyota	30.569	176.650
2	05	John Wes Townley	Athenian Motorsports	Chevrolet	30.574	176.621
3	88	Matt Crafton	ThorSport Racing	Toyota	30.612	176.401
Full second practice results

=== Final practice ===
The final practice session was held on Thursday, May 5, at 5:30 pm CST, and would last for 1 hour and 25 minutes. John Wes Townley, driving for his family team, Athenian Motorsports, would set the fastest time in the session, with a lap of 30.512, and an average speed of 176.980 mph (284.822 km/h).

Pos.	#	Driver	Team	Make	Time	Speed
1	05	John Wes Townley	Athenian Motorsports	Chevrolet	30.512	176.980
2	23	Spencer Gallagher	GMS Racing	Chevrolet	30.552	176.748
3	13	Cameron Hayley	ThorSport Racing	Toyota	30.560	176.702
Full final practice results

== Qualifying ==
Qualifying was held on Friday, May 6, at 3:30 pm CST. Since Kansas Speedway is at least 1.5 miles (2.4 km) in length, the qualifying system was a single car, single lap, two round system where in the first round, everyone would set a time to determine positions 13–32. Then, the fastest 12 qualifiers would move on to the second round to determine positions 1–12.

John Wes Townley, driving for his family team, Athenian Motorsports, would score the pole for the race, with a lap of 30.465, and an average speed of 177.253 mph (285.261 km/h) in the third round.

Norm Benning and Mike Harmon would fail to qualify.

=== Full qualifying results ===
Pos.	#	Driver	Team	Make	Time (R1)	Speed (R1)	Time (R2)	Speed (R2)
1	05	John Wes Townley	Athenian Motorsports	Chevrolet	30.602	176.459	30.465	177.253
2	9	William Byron (R)	Kyle Busch Motorsports	Toyota	30.634	176.275	30.606	176.436
3	29	Tyler Reddick	Brad Keselowski Racing	Ford	30.700	175.896	30.691	175.947
4	00	Cole Custer (R)	JR Motorsports	Chevrolet	30.734	175.701	30.750	175.610
5	4	Christopher Bell (R)	Kyle Busch Motorsports	Toyota	30.841	175.092	30.800	175.325
6	8	John Hunter Nemechek	NEMCO Motorsports	Chevrolet	30.804	175.302	30.835	175.126
7	11	Matt Tifft (R)	Red Horse Racing	Toyota	30.723	175.764	30.837	175.114
8	17	Timothy Peters	Red Horse Racing	Toyota	30.752	175.598	30.888	174.825
9	19	Daniel Hemric	Brad Keselowski Racing	Ford	30.848	175.052	30.965	174.390
10	41	Ben Rhodes (R)	ThorSport Racing	Toyota	30.860	174.984	30.967	174.379
11	33	Ben Kennedy	GMS Racing	Chevrolet	30.812	175.256	30.974	174.340
12	21	Johnny Sauter	GMS Racing	Chevrolet	30.797	175.342	–	–
Eliminated in Round 1
13	88	Matt Crafton	ThorSport Racing	Toyota	30.925	174.616	–	–
14	51	Cody Coughlin (R)	Kyle Busch Motorsports	Toyota	30.986	174.272	–	–
15	13	Cameron Hayley	ThorSport Racing	Toyota	31.030	174.025	–	–
16	24	Clint Bowyer (i)	GMS Racing	Chevrolet	31.090	173.689	–	–
17	71	Mike Bliss	Contreras Motorsports	Chevrolet	31.107	173.594	–	–
18	92	Parker Kligerman	RBR Enterprises	Ford	31.173	173.227	–	–
19	44	Tommy Joe Martins	Martins Motorsports	Chevrolet	31.246	172.822	–	–
20	02	Tyler Young	Young's Motorsports	Chevrolet	31.301	172.518	–	–
21	81	Ryan Truex	Hattori Racing Enterprises	Toyota	31.305	172.496	–	–
22	86	Brandon Brown	Brandonbilt Motorsports	Chevrolet	31.326	172.381	–	–
23	66	Jordan Anderson	Bolen Motorsports	Chevrolet	31.361	172.188	–	–
24	50	Travis Kvapil	MAKE Motorsports	Chevrolet	31.453	171.685	–	–
25	07	B. J. McLeod (i)	SS-Green Light Racing	Chevrolet	31.550	171.157	–	–
26	63	Bobby Pierce	MB Motorsports	Chevrolet	31.578	171.005	–	–
27	49	Timmy Hill	Premium Motorsports	Chevrolet	31.594	170.919	–	–
Qualified by owner's points
28	10	Jennifer Jo Cobb	Jennifer Jo Cobb Racing	Chevrolet	31.766	169.993	–	–
29	22	Austin Wayne Self (R)	AM Racing	Toyota	31.874	169.417	–	–
30	1	Ryan Ellis (i)	MAKE Motorsports	Chevrolet	32.967	163.800	–	–
31	98	Rico Abreu (R)	ThorSport Racing	Toyota	35.451	152.323	–	–
32	23	Spencer Gallagher	GMS Racing	Chevrolet	–	–	–	–
Failed to qualify
33	6	Norm Benning	Norm Benning Racing	Chevrolet	31.806	169.779	–	–
34	74	Mike Harmon (i)	Mike Harmon Racing	Chevrolet	32.887	164.199	–	–
Official qualifying results
Official starting lineup

== Race results ==
Fin	St	#	Driver	Team	Make	Laps	Led	Status	Pts
1	2	9	William Byron (R)	Kyle Busch Motorsports	Toyota	170	34	Running	36
2	13	88	Matt Crafton	ThorSport Racing	Toyota	170	57	Running	33
3	9	19	Daniel Hemric	Brad Keselowski Racing	Ford	170	0	Running	30
4	5	4	Christopher Bell (R)	Kyle Busch Motorsports	Toyota	170	5	Running	30
5	16	24	Clint Bowyer (i)	GMS Racing	Chevrolet	170	0	Running	0
6	21	81	Ryan Truex	Hattori Racing Enterprises	Toyota	170	0	Running	27
7	4	00	Cole Custer (R)	JR Motorsports	Chevrolet	170	0	Running	26
8	8	17	Timothy Peters	Red Horse Racing	Toyota	170	1	Running	26
9	11	33	Ben Kennedy	GMS Racing	Chevrolet	170	0	Running	24
10	32	23	Spencer Gallagher	GMS Racing	Chevrolet	170	0	Running	23
11	20	02	Tyler Young	Young's Motorsports	Chevrolet	170	0	Running	22
12	22	86	Brandon Brown	Brandonbilt Motorsports	Chevrolet	170	0	Running	21
13	3	29	Tyler Reddick	Brad Keselowski Racing	Ford	170	56	Running	21
14	7	11	Matt Tifft (R)	Red Horse Racing	Toyota	170	0	Running	19
15	25	07	B. J. McLeod (i)	SS-Green Light Racing	Chevrolet	170	0	Running	0
16	12	21	Johnny Sauter	GMS Racing	Chevrolet	170	9	Running	18
17	17	71	Mike Bliss	Contreras Motorsports	Chevrolet	170	0	Running	16
18	10	41	Ben Rhodes (R)	ThorSport Racing	Toyota	169	5	Running	16
19	15	13	Cameron Hayley	ThorSport Racing	Toyota	169	2	Running	15
20	24	50	Travis Kvapil	MAKE Motorsports	Chevrolet	169	0	Running	13
21	27	49	Timmy Hill	Premium Motorsports	Chevrolet	168	0	Running	12
22	31	98	Rico Abreu (R)	ThorSport Racing	Toyota	167	0	Running	11
23	26	63	Bobby Pierce	MB Motorsports	Chevrolet	167	0	Running	10
24	28	10	Jennifer Jo Cobb	Jennifer Jo Cobb Racing	Chevrolet	164	0	Running	9
25	29	22	Austin Wayne Self (R)	AM Racing	Toyota	161	0	Running	8
26	1	05	John Wes Townley	Athenian Motorsports	Chevrolet	149	1	Running	8
27	14	51	Cody Coughlin (R)	Kyle Busch Motorsports	Toyota	145	0	Running	6
28	6	8	John Hunter Nemechek	NEMCO Motorsports	Chevrolet	141	0	Running	5
29	23	66	Jordan Anderson	Bolen Motorsports	Chevrolet	82	0	Accident	4
30	30	1	Ryan Ellis (i)	MAKE Motorsports	Chevrolet	52	0	Suspension	0
31	18	92	Parker Kligerman	RBR Enterprises	Ford	48	0	Accident	2
32	19	44	Tommy Joe Martins	Martins Motorsports	Chevrolet	26	0	Suspension	1
Official race results

== Standings after the race ==
Drivers' Championship standings

	Pos	Driver	Points
2	1	Timothy Peters	103
5	2	Daniel Hemric	95 (−8)
3	3	Ryan Truex	93 (−10)
	4	Tyler Young	89 (−14)
4	5	John Hunter Nemechek	88 (−15)
5	6	Matt Crafton	88 (−15)
5	7	William Byron	87 (−16)
1	8	Spencer Gallagher	85 (−18)
Official driver's standings

- Note: Only the first 8 positions are included for the driver standings.

Previous race: 2016 Alpha Energy Solutions 250	NASCAR Camping World Truck Series; 2016 season	Next race: 2016 Jacob Companies 200
