= Parker Kligerman =

American racing driver (born 1990)

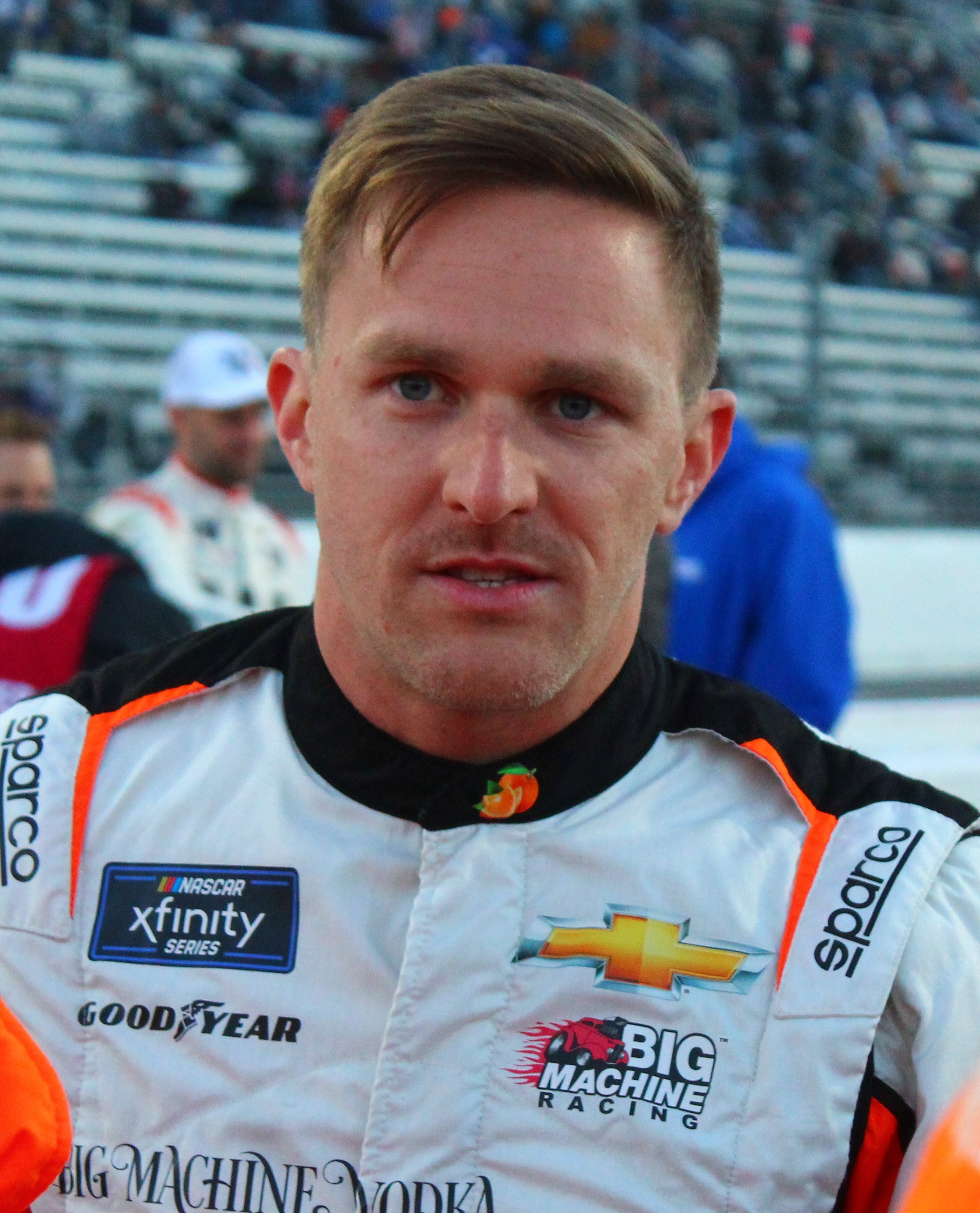
- Kligerman at Martinsville Speedway in 2024
- Born: Parker Lindsley Kligerman; August 8, 1990 (age 36); Westport, Connecticut, U.S.
- Awards: 2009 ARCA Re/Max Series Rookie of the Year; 2009 ARCA Re/Max Series Bill France Four Crown

NASCAR Cup Series career
- 30 races run over 6 years
- 2022 position: 58th
- Best finish: 47th (2014, 2019)
- First race: 2013 AAA Texas 500 (Texas)
- Last race: 2022 Enjoy Illinois 300 (Gateway)
Wins	Top tens	Poles
0	0	0

NASCAR O'Reilly Auto Parts Series career
- 122 races run over 10 years
- 2024 position: 10th
- Best finish: 9th (2013)
- First race: 2009 Kansas Lottery 300 (Kansas)
- Last race: 2024 NASCAR Xfinity Series Championship Race (Phoenix)
Wins	Top tens	Poles
0	53	1

NASCAR FedEx Freight Truck Series career
- 130 races run over 15 years
- 2026 position: 31st
- Best finish: 5th (2012)
- First race: 2010 WinStar World Casino 350K (Texas)
- Last race: 2026 Craftsman 200 (Homestead)
- First win: 2012 Fred's 250 Powered by Coca-Cola (Talladega)
- Last win: 2022 O'Reilly Auto Parts 150 at Mid-Ohio (Mid-Ohio)
Wins	Top tens	Poles
3	54	2

ARCA Menards Series career
- 25 races run over 3 years
- Best finish: 2nd (2009)
- First race: 2008 Loud Energy Drink 150 (Millville)
- Last race: 2016 Sioux Chief PowerPEX 200 (IRP)
- First win: 2009 Menards 200 (Toledo)
- Last win: 2016 Twilight 150 Presented by Unique Pretzels (Millville)
Wins	Top tens	Poles
10	22	2

IMSA SportsCar Championship career
- Debut season: 2025
- Categorisation: FIA Gold (until 2021); FIA Silver (2022–)
- Former teams: Forte Racing
- Starts: 2
- Wins: 0
- Podiums: 0
- Poles: 0
- Fastest laps: 0
- Best finish: 48th in 2025
- Statistics up to date as of November 6, 2026.

Parker Lindsley Kligerman (born August 8, 1990) is an American semi-retired professional stock car racing driver, color commentator for NASCAR on The CW. He last competed part-time in the NASCAR Craftsman Truck Series, driving the No. 25 Ram 1500 for Kaulig Racing, the No. 75 Chevrolet Silverado for Henderson Motorsports and the No. 77 Silverado for Spire Motorsports. Kligerman is a former development driver for Team Penske. He has worked for NBC since 2015 as a TV analyst and pit reporter. In 2023, Kligerman co-founded the motorsports media company "The Money Lap" with Landon Cassill.

== Racing career ==
=== ARCA with Cunningham Motorsports (2008-09) ===
As part of Penske's driver development program, in 2008, Kligerman drove the No. 77 Cunningham Motorsports Dodge in two races in the ARCA RE/MAX Series. He drove the car full-time in 2009, finishing second in points in his rookie season. He made his Nationwide Series debut for Penske in their No. 22 car at Kansas Speedway that year and won the pole. He then drove in the season finale for Team 42 Racing.

=== Penske Racing (2010) ===
Kligerman was slated to contest the first five races of the 2010 NASCAR Nationwide Series season with Team 42, with additional appearances possible. However, he failed to qualify at Daytona and Bristol. After missing the show at Bristol, he was out of the car until returning for the eighth race of the season at Talladega, where he crashed on lap 113. He earned his first top-ten finish at Bristol's second race with a ninth-place finish. Kligerman also earned a top ten with an eighth-place finish at Circuit Gilles Villeneuve.

=== Brad Keselowski Racing (2011–2012) ===
Kligerman competed for Rookie of the Year in the NASCAR Camping World Truck Series in 2011, driving the No. 29 Ram for Brad Keselowski Racing. He returned to the No. 29 truck in 2012, and also drove the Penske Racing No. 22 in the Nationwide Series on a limited schedule, sharing the seat with Brad Keselowski and Jacques Villeneuve.

After the first eleven races of the 2012 season, Kligerman was released from his ride at Brad Keselowski Racing. Shortly thereafter, Red Horse Racing announced that they had signed a contract with Kligerman to drive the No. 7 Toyota for the remainder of the season.

Kligerman practiced and qualified the No. 22 Dodge for Penske Racing at Michigan International Speedway in the Sprint Cup Series in August 2012, as regular driver Sam Hornish Jr. competed in the Nationwide Series race at Circuit Gilles Villeneuve that weekend, returning for the race.

Kligerman won his first Camping World Truck Series race at Talladega Superspeedway on October 6, 2012. A fringe title contender late in the season, Kligerman was officially eliminated from championship contention after being involved in a crash at Phoenix and finishing in 27th place. The next week, he would make his final start for Red Horse Racing in the 2012 season finale at Homestead-Miami Speedway, winning his second career pole and finishing in seventh place. He finished fifth in the series points standings.

=== Kyle Busch Motorsports (2013) ===
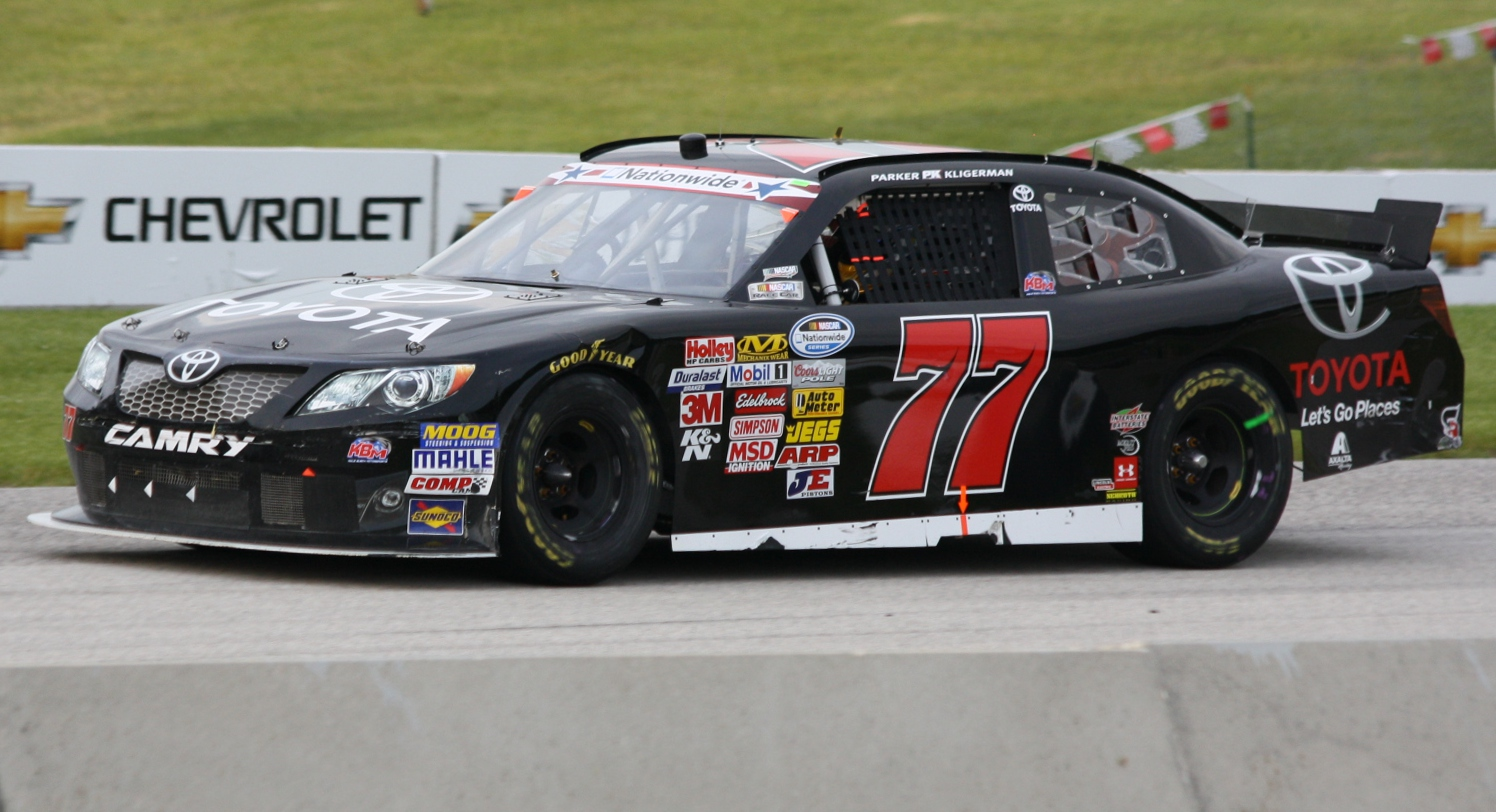
Kligerman's No. 77 Nationwide car

Announcing that he would not be returning to Red Horse Racing or the Camping World Truck Series in 2013, Kligerman signed with Kyle Busch Motorsports to drive their No. 77 Toyota Camry in the NASCAR Nationwide Series full-time in 2013. He disappointed at KBM, only finishing in the top-five three times and ending the year ninth in points.

=== Swan Racing (2013-14) ===
In November 2013, Kligerman made his Sprint Cup debut at Texas Motor Speedway in the AAA Texas 500, driving for Swan Racing. He finished eighteenth in the event, Swan's best result in 2013. Two weekends later, at the Ford 400, Kligerman impressed again by finishing 25th, on the lead lap.

For 2014, Swan Racing announced Kligerman's hiring for the full 2014 season, as part of an expansion to two full-time teams, alongside Cole Whitt. During a practice session for the 2014 Daytona 500, Kligerman was involved in an accident that saw his car overturned into the catch fencing, but was uninjured.

Due to sponsorship woes and on track struggles including many DNFs and wrecked race cars in the first eight races, Swan was forced to sell off both of its teams prior to Richmond, with the No. 30 points being bought by Xxxtreme Motorsport, who already had a driver in J. J. Yeley. Thus, Kligerman was without a ride. However, Swan continued to keep Kligerman under contract for the remainder of the year in the event they would resume operations. On May 14, Stewart–Haas Racing announced that Kligerman would serve as a practice and stand-by driver for Kurt Busch in the No. 41 at the Sprint All-Star Race and Coca-Cola 600 when Busch was attempting the 600-Indianapolis 500 "Double Duty". Kligerman began working with NBC Sports Network (NBCSN) as an analyst later in the 2014 season. In September, he announced that he would test an Indy Lights car for Schmidt Peterson Motorsports.

=== Various Teams (2015–2016) ===
In 2015, Kligerman continued his work with NBCSN, including commentary on tape-delayed broadcasts of the K&N Pro Series. At Darlington in September, he returned to competition, driving the No. 97 Chevrolet for Obaika Racing in the Xfinity Series.

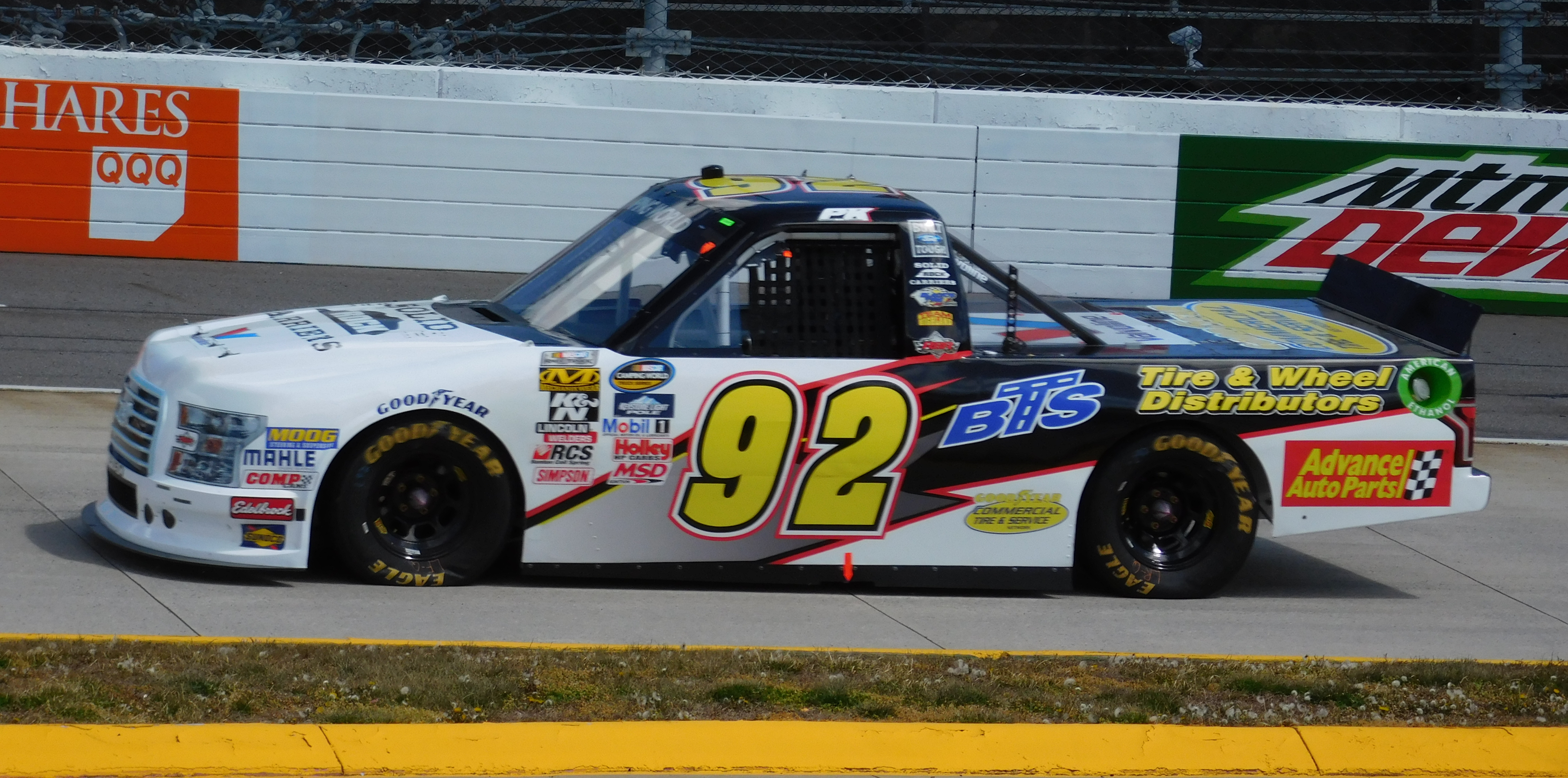
Kligerman's No. 92 truck at Martinsville Speedway in 2016

On February 3, 2016, it was announced that Kligerman would drive the No. 92 Ford F-150 for RBR Enterprises at Daytona in the Truck Series. In July, Kligerman joined Athenian Motorsports for the Truck race at Kentucky, replacing an injured John Wes Townley. Before the Martinsville race, Kligerman and RBR mutually parted ways leaving Kligerman without a ride. Kligerman was called upon to drive the No. 75 Toyota for Henderson Motorsports at Talladega. Kligerman would not make the race after sustaining a brake issue during qualifying.

=== Henderson Motorsports (2017–2022) ===
In 2017, Kligerman returned to Henderson Motorsports to run eight–ten races in addition to serving as a Cup Series and Xfinity Series pit reporter for NBC Sports. After starting the year with a DNQ at Daytona, Kligerman won at the schedule's second plate track Talladega in October.

After three years out of the series, in May 2018, Kligerman joined Gaunt Brothers Racing for his Cup Series return in the Coca-Cola 600. In 2019, he ran fourteen races for GBR, recording a best finish of 15th in the Daytona 500 and 1000Bulbs.com 500. He did not return to the team in 2020.

Despite not returning to the Cup series in 2020, Kligerman would rejoin Henderson for ten Truck series starts that year in the No. 75 Silverado, failing to qualify for his first two attempts, but successfully making the field at his other attempts. He would run well, with his worst finish being a 34th at Dover due to his engine giving out after 94 laps, and his best fishing being fourth at Bristol.

Kiligerman would increase his truck schedule from ten races to twelve races in 2021. He would get two top fives at Watkins Glen and Darlington. He would also rejoin Gaunt Brothers Racing for the Fall Kansas Race, where he managed to bring the 96 to a twentieth-place finish. Kligerman said that the car was one of the best Cup cars he has ever driven.

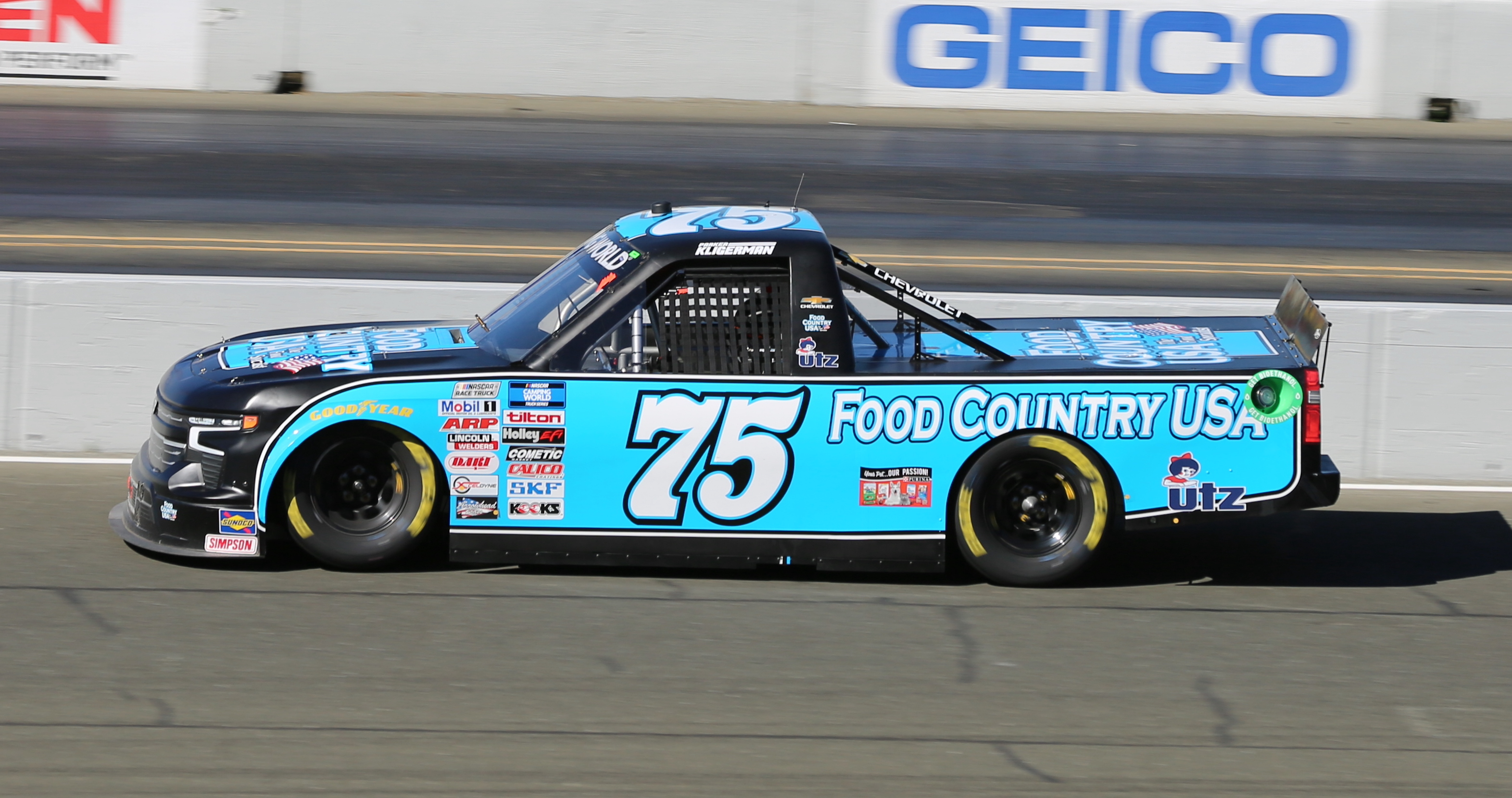
Kligerman's No. 75 truck at Sonoma Raceway in 2022

On December 27, 2021, in response to a fan's tweet, Kligerman revealed that he would return to Henderson Motorsports to drive the No. 75 truck in eight to twelve races in 2022.

On July 9, 2022, in the O'Reilly Auto Parts 150 at Mid-Ohio, Kligerman earned his third victory in the Truck Series, which was also a decisive win against Zane Smith.

=== Big Machine Racing (2023–2024) ===
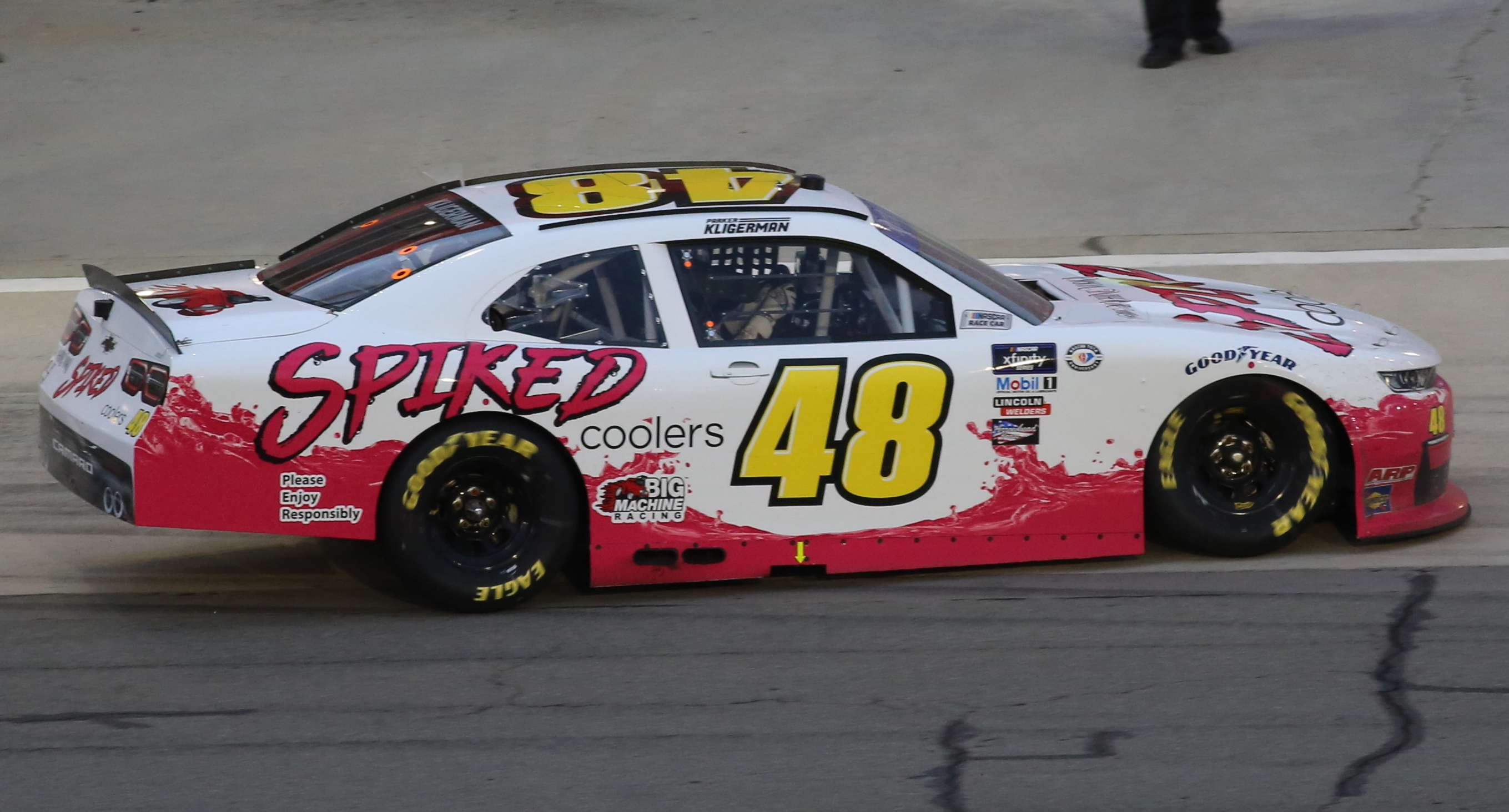
Kligerman at Auto Club Speedway in 2023

On October 29, 2022, Big Machine Racing announced that Kligerman would drive the No. 48 car full-time in the 2023 Xfinity Series season. Kligerman started the season with a 23rd-place finish at Daytona. He stayed mostly consistent throughout the regular season, and made the playoffs for the first time in his career, and the first playoff appearance for Big Machine Racing. Kligerman was eliminated at the conclusion of the Charlotte Roval race.

On August 24, 2023, it was announced that Kligerman would return to BMR for the 2024 season. Following the Michigan race, the No. 48 was levied an L1 penalty after pre-race inspection discovered illegal modifications on the rear spoiler; as a result, the team was docked twenty owner and driver points, and crew chief Patrick Donahue was fined US$25,000. On September 11, Kligerman announced on his podcast that he would not return to BMR and would retire from full-time racing at the end of the 2024 season.

On October 12, 2024, Kligerman was leading late at the Charlotte Roval when the No. 42 of Leland Honeyman crashed deep into the tire barrier with two to go. NASCAR didn't throw a caution until after Kligerman had taken the white flag, when he and his team started celebrating their first Xfinity win. However, it was announced that Kligerman did not get back to the white flag before the caution, and a replay showed he was less than five feet short of the white flag when the caution lights came on. On the final restart, Kligerman then got passed in turn seven by eventual race winner Sam Mayer and would fall back to sixth place, eliminating him from the playoffs.

=== Part Time Status (2025-Present) ===
On February 14, 2025, Kligerman unofficially won the NASCAR Craftsman Truck Series opener, the Fresh From Florida 250, at Daytona in the No. 75 for Henderson Motorsports but later failed post-race inspection for the truck being too low. Corey Heim, who originally finished second, was credited with the win while Kligerman was relegated to last.

After Xfinity Series rookie driver Connor Zilisch suffered a broken collarbone a few weeks earlier, Kligerman was announced as the backup-driver for JR Motorsports’ No. 88, at the Wawa 250 at Daytona. Kligerman swapped out Zilisch at lap thirteen and ultimately drove the car to victory lane. Under NASCAR rules, Zilisch was credited as the winner for starting the race.

== Media career ==
Kligerman's first foray into the media started in 2013 with Jalopnik, contributing articles based on his personal experience in NASCAR and his love for all things cars.

In 2013, Kligerman began his career behind the mic by launching the Kicking it with Kligerman Podcast. Initially a weekly special that aired on SiriusXM's NASCAR channel, it soon began a full-time podcast where Kligerman would talk with motorsports personalities.

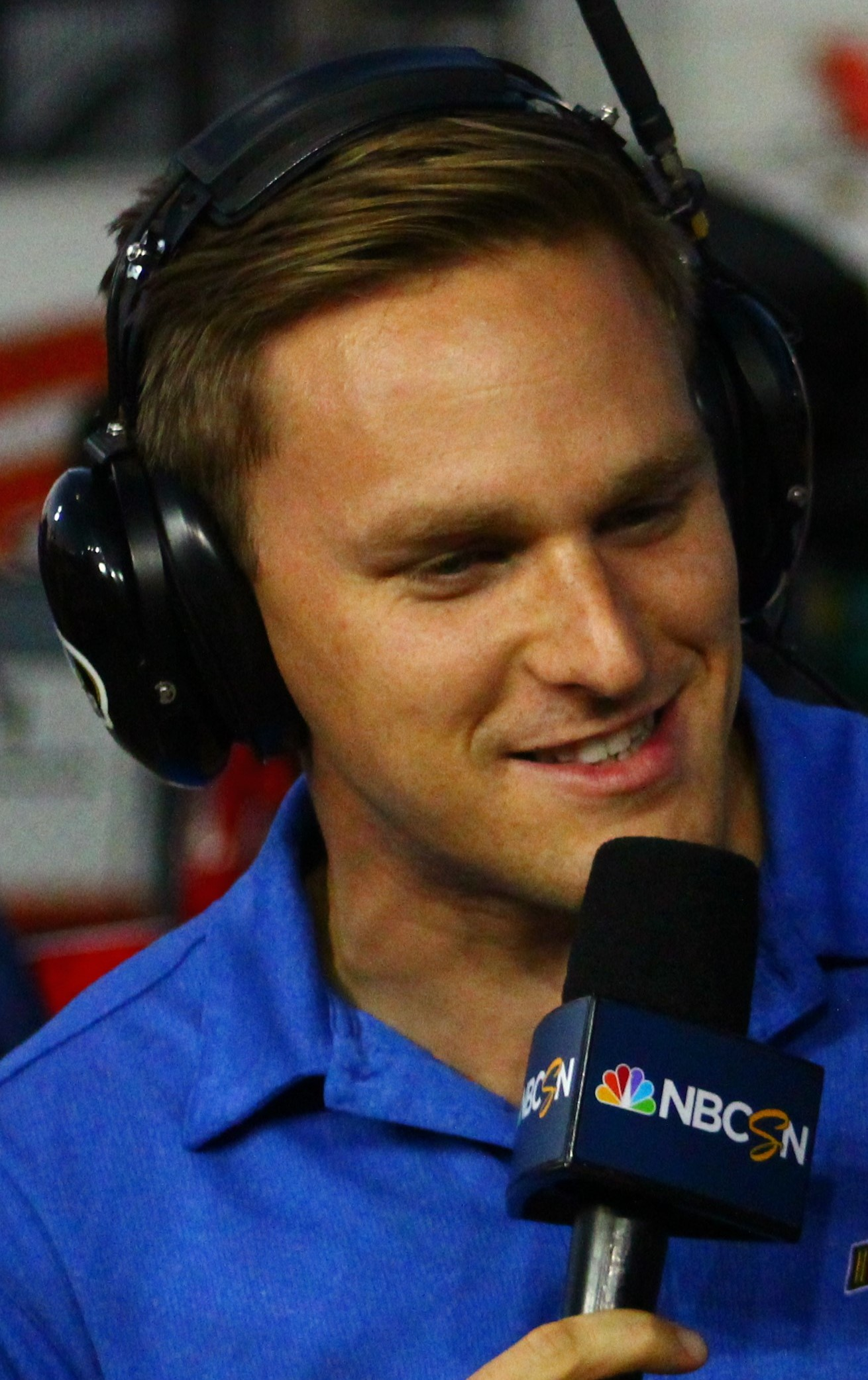
Kligerman at Richmond Raceway in 2018.

Kligerman started working for NBC Sports in 2014 as a TV Analyst. Two years later, Parker made his debut as a pit reporter for a NASCAR Cup race.

=== Television and Internet hosting career ===
==== Proving Grounds (2018–2020) ====
Parker Kligerman co-hosted the popular automotive television series Proving Grounds from 2018 to 2020. Spanning three seasons, the show made its debut on October 1, 2018, featuring Kligerman alongside fellow co-hosts Sam Smith and Leh Keen. The series focused on exploring high-performance vehicles.

==== #InTheWall (2019–2022) ====
Kligerman expanded his media presence by hosting #InTheWall for NBC Sports on their YouTube channel, a show aimed at diving deeper into the biggest topics in motorsports each week. The show ran from 2019 to 2022. Guests included A. J. Allmendinger, Logan Sargeant and Rob Smedley.

== The Money Lap ==
In 2023, Parker founded "The Money Lap," a brand dedicated to covering, discussing, and exploring various facets of motorsports. The brand has the tagline, "The Coolest Stuff in Motorsports."

=== The Money Lap podcast ===
A key feature of "The Money Lap" is its podcast, co-hosted by Parker and Landon Cassill. The podcast delves into a range of topics across different motorsports disciplines. Guests have included Dale Earnhardt Jr., James Hinchcliffe, Cole Custer, Will Buxton, and other motorsports industry figures. The Money Lap Podcast debuted in the Top 60 US sport shows on Apple Charts.

== Personal life ==
Kligerman was born in Greenwich and lived in Stamford until he was 11, then moved to neighboring Westport, Connecticut, where he stayed until his move to NASCAR. Kligerman currently resides in Stamford.

Kligerman is the co-founder and president of Focus Now Solutions, the manufacturer of focus-enhancing beverage product Focus7 Shot.

Kligerman is also part of Lime Rock Group, LLC, the group that owns Lime Rock Park.

== Motorsports career results ==
=== Racing career summary ===
Season	Series	Team	Races	Wins	Top 5	Top 10	Points	Position
2008	ARCA Re/Max Series	Cunningham Motorsports	2	0	0	2	645	47th
2009	ARCA Re/Max Series	Cunningham Motorsports	21	9	14	18	5710	**2nd**
2009	NASCAR Nationwide Series	Penske Racing	1	0	0	0	208	95th
2009	NASCAR Nationwide Series	Smith-Ganassi Racing	1	0	0	0	208	95th
2010	NASCAR Camping World Truck Series	Brad Keselowski Racing	1	0	0	1	138	88th
2010	NASCAR Nationwide Series	Smith-Ganassi Racing	8	0	0	0	1090	39th
2010	NASCAR Nationwide Series	Penske Racing	4	0	0	1	1090	39th
2011	NASCAR Camping World Truck Series	Brad Keselowski Racing	25	0	4	8	728	11th
2011	NASCAR Nationwide Series	Penske Racing	1	0	0	1	0	NC†
2012	NASCAR Camping World Truck Series	Brad Keselowski Racing	11	0	2	7	778	5th
2012	NASCAR Camping World Truck Series	Red Horse Racing	11	1	6	8	778	5th
2012	NASCAR Nationwide Series	Penske Racing	3	0	0	2	0	NC†
2013	NASCAR Camping World Truck Series	BRG Motorsports	1	0	1	1	0	NC†
2013	NASCAR Nationwide Series	Kyle Busch Motorsports	33	0	3	13	993	9th
2013	NASCAR Sprint Cup Series	Swan Racing Company	2	0	0	0	0	NC†
2014	NASCAR Camping World Truck Series	BRG Motorsports	1	0	0	0	0	NC†
2014	NASCAR Sprint Cup Series	Swan Racing	8	0	0	0	54	47th
2015	NASCAR Xfinity Series	Obaika Racing	1	0	0	0	23	68th
2016	ARCA Racing Series	Cunningham Motorsports	1	1	1	1	450	52nd
2016	ARCA Racing Series	Athenian Motorsports	1	0	0	1	450	52nd
2016	NASCAR Camping World Truck Series	Athenian Motorsports	10	0	1	3	164	24th
2016	NASCAR Camping World Truck Series	RBR Enterprises	1	0	0	0	164	24th
2017	NASCAR Camping World Truck Series	Henderson Motorsports	7	1	1	5	184	26th
2017	NASCAR Xfinity Series	Precision Performance Motorsports	1	0	0	1	0	NC†
2018	NASCAR Camping World Truck Series	Henderson Motorsports	8	0	1	2	172	24th
2018	Monster Energy NASCAR Cup Series	Gaunt Brothers Racing	4	0	0	0	0	NC†
2019	NASCAR Gander Outdoors Truck Series	Henderson Motorsports	3	0	0	1	72	41st
2019	Monster Energy NASCAR Cup Series	Gaunt Brothers Racing	14	0	0	0	0	NC†
2020	NASCAR Gander Outdoors Truck Series	Henderson Motorsports	8	0	1	3	175	28th
2021	NASCAR Camping World Truck Series	Henderson Motorsports	11	0	2	5	254	23rd
2021	NASCAR Cup Series	Gaunt Brothers Racing	1	0	0	0	0	NC†
2022	NASCAR Camping World Truck Series	Henderson Motorsports	12	1	4	8	400	19th
2022	NASCAR Xfinity Series	Precision Performance Motorsports	2	0	0	0	0	NC†
2022	NASCAR Xfinity Series	Big Machine Racing	1	0	0	1	0	NC†
2022	NASCAR Cup Series	Rick Ware Racing	1	0	0	0	0	NC†
2023	NASCAR Craftsman Truck Series	Henderson Motorsports	7	0	0	0	0	NC†
2023	NASCAR Xfinity Series	Big Machine Racing	33	0	8	18	2209	10th
2024	NASCAR Xfinity Series	Big Machine Racing	33	0	5	15	2190	10th
2025	NASCAR Craftsman Truck Series	Henderson Motorsports	8	0	0	0	106	31st
2025	IMSA SportsCar Championship - GTD	Forte Racing	2	0	0	0	430	48th
2025	24 Hours of Daytona	Forte Racing	1	0	0	0	N/A	12th
2026	NASCAR Craftsman Truck Series	Kaulig Racing	3	0	0	0	135	31st
2026	NASCAR Craftsman Truck Series	Henderson Motorsports	1	0	0	0	135	31st
2026	NASCAR Craftsman Truck Series	Spire Motorsports	1	0	1	1	135	31st

^{†} As Kligerman was a guest driver, he was ineligible for championship points.

=== NASCAR ===
(key) (Bold – Pole position awarded by qualifying time. Italics – Pole position earned by points standings or practice time. * – Most laps led.)

==== Cup Series ====
NASCAR Cup Series results
Year	Team	No.	Make	1	2	3	4	5	6	7	8	9	10	11	12	13	14	15	16	17	18	19	20	21	22	23	24	25	26	27	28	29	30	31	32	33	34	35	36	NCSC	Pts	Ref
2012	Penske Racing	22	Dodge	DAY	PHO	LVS	BRI	CAL	MAR	TEX	KAN	RCH	TAL	DAR	CLT	DOV	POC	MCH	SON	KEN	DAY	NHA	IND	POC	GLN	MCH; QL^{†}	BRI	ATL	RCH	CHI	NHA	DOV	TAL	CLT	KAN	MAR	TEX	PHO	HOM	N/A	—	
2013	Swan Racing Company	30	Toyota	DAY	PHO	LVS	BRI	CAL	MAR	TEX	KAN	RCH	TAL	DAR	CLT	DOV	POC	MCH	SON	KEN	DAY	NHA	IND	POC	GLN	MCH	BRI	ATL	RCH	CHI	NHA	DOV	KAN	CLT	TAL	MAR	TEX; 18	PHO	HOM; 25	59th	0^{1}	
2014	Swan Racing	30	Toyota	DAY; 29	PHO; 42	LVS; 40	BRI; 34	CAL; 42	MAR; 41	TEX; 40	DAR; 30	RCH	TAL	KAN	CLT	DOV	POC	MCH	SON	KEN	DAY	NHA	IND	POC	GLN	MCH	BRI	ATL	RCH	CHI	NHA	DOV	KAN	CLT	TAL	MAR	TEX	PHO	HOM	47th	54	
2018	Gaunt Brothers Racing	96	Toyota	DAY	ATL	LVS	PHO	CAL	MAR	TEX	BRI	RCH	TAL	DOV	KAN	CLT; 27	POC	MCH	SON; 23	CHI	DAY	KEN	NHA	POC	GLN; 24	MCH	BRI	DAR	IND	LVS	RCH	ROV	DOV	TAL	KAN	MAR	TEX; 31	PHO	HOM	60th	0^{1}	
2019	Gaunt Brothers Racing	96	Toyota	DAY; 15	ATL; 30	LVS; 31	PHO	CAL	MAR	TEX; 27	BRI	RCH	TAL; 27	DOV	KAN	CLT; 26	POC	MCH	SON; 30	CHI	DAY; 31	KEN	NHA	POC	GLN; 26	MCH	BRI	DAR	IND; 36	LVS	RCH	ROV; 26	DOV	TAL; 15	KAN; 29	MAR	TEX; 22	PHO	HOM	47th	0^{1}	
2021	Gaunt Brothers Racing	96	Toyota	DAY	DRC	HOM	LVS	PHO	ATL	BRD	MAR	RCH	TAL	KAN	DAR	DOV	COA	CLT	SON	NSH	POC	POC	ROA	ATL	NHA	GLN	IRC	MCH	DAY	DAR	RCH	BRI	LVS	TAL	ROV	TEX	KAN; 20	MAR	PHO	52nd	0^{1}	
2022	Rick Ware Racing	15	Ford	DAY	CAL	LVS	PHO	ATL	COA	RCH	MAR	BRD	TAL	DOV	DAR	KAN	CLT	GTW; 31	SON	NSH	ROA	ATL	NHA	POC	IRC	MCH	RCH	GLN	DAY	DAR	KAN	BRI	TEX	TAL	ROV	LVS	HOM	MAR	PHO	58th	0^{1}	
^{†} – Qualified for Sam Hornish Jr.

===== Daytona 500 =====
Year	Team	Manufacturer	Start	Finish
2014	Swan Racing	Toyota	41	29
2019	Gaunt Brothers Racing	Toyota	25	15

==== Xfinity Series ====
NASCAR Xfinity Series results
Year	Team	No.	Make	1	2	3	4	5	6	7	8	9	10	11	12	13	14	15	16	17	18	19	20	21	22	23	24	25	26	27	28	29	30	31	32	33	34	35	NXSC	Pts	Ref
2009	Penske Racing	22	Dodge	DAY	CAL	LVS	BRI	TEX	NSH	PHO	TAL	RCH	DAR	CLT	DOV	NSH	KEN	MLW	NHA	DAY	CHI	GTY	IRP	IOW	GLN	MCH	BRI	CGV	ATL	RCH	DOV	**KAN**; 16	CAL	CLT	MEM	TEX	PHO	HOM; DNQ	95th	208	
2009	Smith-Ganassi Racing	42	Dodge																																			HOM; 25	95th	208	
2010	Smith-Ganassi Racing	42	Dodge	DAY; Wth	CAL; 22	LVS; 35	BRI; DNQ	NSH	PHO	TEX	TAL; 31	RCH	DAR	DOV	CLT; DNQ	NSH	KEN	ROA	NHA		CHI; 13	GTY	IRP	IOW	GLN	MCH	BRI; 9					KAN; 24	CAL			TEX; 34	PHO	HOM; 13	39th	1090	
2010	Penske Racing	26	Dodge																	DAY; 13								CGV; 8	ATL	RCH; 15	DOV			CLT; 43					39th	1090	
2010	Penske Racing	22	Dodge																																GTY; QL^{†}				39th	1090	
2011	Penske Racing	22	Dodge	DAY	PHO	LVS	BRI	CAL	TEX	TAL	NSH	RCH	DAR	DOV	IOW	CLT	CHI	MCH	ROA	DAY	KEN	NHA	NSH	IRP	IOW	GLN	CGV	BRI; 9	ATL	RCH	CHI	DOV	KAN	CLT	TEX	PHO	HOM		115th	0^{1}	
2012	Penske Racing	22	Dodge	DAY	PHO	LVS	BRI	CAL	TEX	RCH	TAL	DAR	IOW; 8	CLT	DOV; 12	MCH	ROA	KEN	DAY	NHA	CHI; 7	IND	IOW	GLN	CGV	BRI	ATL	RCH	CHI	KEN	DOV	CLT	KAN	TEX	PHO	HOM			120th	0^{1}	
2013	Kyle Busch Motorsports	77	Toyota	DAY; 5	PHO; 19	LVS; 30	BRI; 9	CAL; 4	TEX; 12	RCH; 11	TAL; 6	DAR; 15	CLT; 9	DOV; 11	IOW; 14	MCH; 25	ROA; 3	KEN; 16	DAY; 18	NHA; 20	CHI; 6	IND; 18	IOW; 16	GLN; 6	MOH; 13	BRI; 35	ATL; 16	RCH; 36	CHI; 8	KEN; 29	DOV; 7	KAN; 7	CLT; 9	TEX; 13	PHO; 12	HOM; 7			9th	993	
2015	Obaika Racing	97	Chevy	DAY	ATL	LVS	PHO	CAL	TEX	BRI	RCH	TAL	IOW	CLT	DOV	MCH	CHI	DAY	KEN	NHA	IND	IOW	GLN	MOH	BRI	ROA	DAR; 21	RCH	CHI	KEN	DOV	CLT	KAN	TEX	PHO	HOM			68th	23	
2017	Precision Performance Motorsports	46	Chevy	DAY	ATL	LVS	PHO	CAL	TEX	BRI	RCH	TAL	CLT	DOV	POC	MCH	IOW	DAY	KEN	NHA	IND	IOW	GLN	MOH	BRI	ROA; 10	DAR	RCH	CHI	KEN	DOV	CLT	KAN	TEX	PHO	HOM			102nd	0^{1}	
2022	Emerling-Gase Motorsports	35	Toyota	DAY	CAL	LVS	PHO	ATL	COA; 12	RCH	MAR	TAL	DOV	DAR	TEX	CLT	PIR	NSH	ROA	ATL	NHA	POC	IRC; 37	MCH	GLN	DAY	DAR	KAN	BRI	TEX									85th	0^{1}	
2022	Big Machine Racing	48	Chevy																												TAL; 6	ROV	LVS	HOM	MAR	PHO			85th	0^{1}	
2023	Big Machine Racing	48	Chevy	DAY; 23	CAL; 10	LVS; 11	PHO; 15	ATL; 4	COA; 30	RCH; 8	MAR; 16	TAL; 3	DOV; 38	DAR; 13	CLT; 38	PIR; 14	SON; 5	NSH; 11	CSC; 9	ATL; 8	NHA; 32	POC; 9	ROA; 2	MCH; 8	IRC; 7	GLN; 3	DAY; 4	DAR; 24	KAN; 4	BRI; 31	TEX; 2	ROV; 6	LVS; 13	HOM; 7	MAR; 10	PHO; 16			10th	2209	
2024	Big Machine Racing	48	Chevy	DAY; 25	ATL; 19	LVS; 11	PHO; 8	COA; 5	RCH; 7	MAR; 12	TEX; 25	TAL; 29	DOV; 12	DAR; 6	CLT; 37	PIR; 8	SON; 10	IOW; 11	NHA; 7	NSH; 16	CSC; 4	POC; 8	IND; 12	MCH; 11	DAY; 3	DAR; 13	ATL; 2	GLN; 7	BRI; 16	KAN; 12	TAL; 12	ROV; 6	LVS; 5	HOM; 11	MAR; 8	PHO; 14			10th	2190	
2025	JR Motorsports	88	Chevy	DAY	ATL	COA	PHO	LVS	HOM	MAR	DAR	BRI	CAR	TAL	TEX	CLT	NSH	MXC	POC	ATL	CSC	SON	DOV	IND	IOW	GLN	DAY; RL^{‡}	PIR	GTW	BRI	KAN	ROV	LVS	TAL	MAR	PHO			N/A	—	
^{†} – Qualified for Brad Keselowski ^{‡} – Relieved Connor Zilisch. Kligerman would go on to win the race, but it does not count towards his total, as Zilisch started the race and therefore gets credited with the win.

==== Craftsman Truck Series ====
NASCAR Craftsman Truck Series results
Year	Team	No.	Make	1	2	3	4	5	6	7	8	9	10	11	12	13	14	15	16	17	18	19	20	21	22	23	24	25	NCTC	Pts	Ref
2010	Brad Keselowski Racing	29	Ram	DAY	ATL	MAR	NSH	KAN	DOV	CLT	TEX	MCH	IOW	GTY	IRP	POC	NSH	DAR	BRI	CHI	KEN	NHA	LVS	MAR	TAL	TEX; 9	PHO	HOM	88th	138	
2011	Brad Keselowski Racing	29	Ram	DAY; 15	PHO; 32	DAR; 14	MAR; 13	NSH; 10	DOV; 21	CLT; 8	KAN; 11	TEX; 2	KEN; 2	IOW; 22	NSH; 5	IRP; 11	POC; 13	MCH; 23	BRI; 10	ATL; 12	CHI; 4	NHA; 18	KEN; 29	LVS; 10	TAL; 28	MAR; 21	TEX; 28	HOM; 14	11th	728	
2012	Brad Keselowski Racing	29	Ram	DAY; 11	MAR; 11	CAR; 9	KAN; 8	CLT; 11	DOV; 2	TEX; 10	KEN; 19	IOW; 10	CHI; 5	POC; 7															5th	778	
2012	Red Horse Racing	7	Toyota												MCH; 4	BRI; 2	ATL; 4	**IOW**; 23*	KEN; 2	LVS; 19	TAL; 1	MAR; 9	TEX; 2	PHO; 27	**HOM**; 7				5th	778	
2013	BRG Motorsports	20	Toyota	DAY	MAR	CAR	KAN	CLT	DOV	TEX	KEN	IOW	ELD	POC	MCH	BRI	MSP	IOW	CHI	LVS	TAL; 4	MAR	TEX	PHO	HOM				90th	0^{1}	
2014	BRG Motorsports	58	Toyota	DAY; 29	MAR	KAN	CHA	DOV	TEX	GTW	KEN	IOW	ELD	POC	MCH	BRI	MSP	CHI	NHA	LVS	TAL	MAR	TEX	PHO	HOM				107th	0^{1}	
2016	RBR Enterprises	92	Ford	DAY; 3	ATL; 8	MAR; 8	KAN; 31	DOV; 27	CLT; 18	TEX; 20	IOW; 31	GTW				BRI; 20	MCH	MSP	CHI	NHA	LVS; 14								24th	164	
2016	Athenian Motorsports	05	Chevy										KEN; 19	ELD	POC														24th	164	
2016	Henderson Motorsports	75	Toyota																			TAL; DNQ	MAR	TEX	PHO	HOM			24th	164	
2017	Henderson Motorsports	75	Toyota	DAY; DNQ	ATL; 31	MAR	KAN	CLT; 10	DOV; 21	TEX	GTW	IOW	KEN; 7	ELD	POC	MCH	BRI; 8	MSP; 8	CHI	NHA	LVS	TAL; 1	MAR	TEX	PHO	HOM			26th	184	
2018	Henderson Motorsports	75	Chevy	DAY; 28	ATL; 11	LVS	MAR	DOV; 28	KAN	CLT; 7	TEX	IOW	GTW	CHI	KEN; 27	ELD	POC	MCH	BRI; 4	MSP	LVS	TAL; 28	MAR; 16	TEX	PHO	HOM			24th	172	
2019	Henderson Motorsports	75	Chevy	DAY	ATL; 20	LVS	MAR	TEX	DOV	KAN	CLT	TEX	IOW	GTW	CHI	KEN	POC	ELD	MCH	BRI; 13	MSP	LVS	TAL	MAR	PHO	HOM; 10			41st	72	
2020	Henderson Motorsports	75	Chevy	DAY	LVS	CLT; DNQ	ATL; DNQ	HOM	POC; 15	KEN; 18	TEX	KAN	KAN	MCH; 9	DRC; 8	DOV; 34	GTW	DAR	RCH	BRI; 4	LVS	TAL	KAN; 15	TEX	MAR; 24	PHO			28th	175	
2021	Henderson Motorsports	75	Chevy	DAY; DNQ	DRC	LVS; 8	ATL; 14	BRD; 8	RCH	KAN	DAR; 26	COA; 13	CLT	TEX	NSH; 17	POC	KNX	GLN; 5	GTW	DAR; 5			TAL; 37						23rd	254	
2021	Henderson Motorsports	75	Toyota																		BRI; 21	LVS		MAR; 6	PHO				23rd	254	
2022	Henderson Motorsports	75	Chevy	DAY; 5	LVS	ATL	COA; 19	MAR; 16	BRD; 4						SON; 7	KNO		MOH; 1*	POC	IRP	RCH			TAL; 9					19th	400	
2022	Henderson Motorsports	75	Toyota							DAR; 6	KAN	TEX	CLT	GTW			NSH; 20					KAN; 11	BRI; 3		HOM; 9	PHO			19th	400	
2023	Henderson Motorsports	75	Chevy	DAY; 32	LVS	ATL	COA; 31	TEX	BRD; 31	MAR	KAN	DAR; 34	NWS; DNQ	CLT	GTW	NSH	MOH	POC; 22	RCH	IRP	MLW	KAN	BRI; 18	TAL; 9	HOM	PHO			97th	0^{1}	
2025	Henderson Motorsports	75	Chevy	DAY; 36	ATL	LVS	HOM	MAR	BRI; 14	CAR; 25	TEX	KAN	NWS	CLT; 14	NSH	MCH	POC	LRP	IRP	GLN; 31	RCH	DAR	BRI; 14	NHA	ROV; 35	TAL; 26	MAR	PHO	31st	106	
2026	Kaulig Racing	25	Ram	DAY	ATL	STP	DAR	CAR	BRI	TEX; 11	GLN	DOV	CLT	NSH	MCH; 16													HOM; 15	31st	135	
2026	Henderson Motorsports	75	Chevy													COR; 18													31st	135	
2026	Spire Motorsports	77	Chevy														LRP; 4	NWS	IRP	RCH	NHA	BRI	KAN	CLT	PHO	TAL	MAR		31st	135	

^{*} Season still in progress
^{1} Ineligible for series points

=== ARCA Racing Series ===
(key) (Bold – Pole position awarded by qualifying time. Italics – Pole position earned by points standings or practice time. * – Most laps led.)

ARCA Racing Series results
Year	Team	No.	Make	1	2	3	4	5	6	7	8	9	10	11	12	13	14	15	16	17	18	19	20	21	ARSC	Pts	Ref
2008	Cunningham Motorsports	77	Dodge	DAY	SLM	IOW	KEN	CAR	KEN	TOL	POC	MCH	CAY	KEN	BLN	POC	NSH	ISF	DSF	CHI	SLM	NJE; 6	TAL	TOL; 9	47th	645	
2009	Cunningham Motorsports	77	Dodge	DAY; 7	SLM; 3	CAR; 5	TAL; 7	KEN; 17	TOL; 1	POC; 6	MCH; 1	MFD; 1*	IOW; 1*	KEN; 1*	BLN; 6	POC; 21	ISF; 1	CHI; 17	TOL; 3*	DSF; 1	NJE; 2	SLM; 2	KAN; 1*	CAR; 1*	2nd	5710	
2016	Cunningham Motorsports	22	Dodge	DAY	NSH	SLM	TAL	TOL	**NJE**; 1*	POC	MCH	MAD	WIN	IOW											52nd	450	
2016	Athenian Motorsports	05	Chevy												**IRP**; 8	POC	BLN	ISF	DSF	SLM	CHI	KEN	KAN		52nd	450	

=== Complete IMSA SportsCar Championship results ===
(key) (Races in bold indicate pole position; results in italics indicate fastest lap)

Year	Team	Class	Make	Engine	1	2	3	4	5	6	7	8	9	10	Pos.	Points
2025	Forte Racing	GTD	Lamborghini Huracán GT3 Evo 2	Lamborghini DGF 5.2 L V10	DAY; 12	SEB; 12	LBH	LGA	WGL	MOS	ELK	VIR	IMS	PET	48th	430

^{*} Season still in progress.

=== 24 Hours of Daytona results ===
Year	Team	Co-drivers	Car	Class	Laps	Pos.	Class Pos.
2025	(United States) Forte Racing	(Germany) Mario Farnbacher (Canada) Misha Goikhberg (France) Franck Perera	Lamborghini Huracán GT3 Evo 2	GTD	591	42nd	12th
