= Henderson Motorsports =

NASCAR team

- Owner: Don Henderson
- Base: Abingdon, Virginia
- Series: NASCAR Craftsman Truck Series
- Race drivers: 75. Corey LaJoie, Parker Kligerman, Landon Huffman, Nick Sanchez (part-time)
- Manufacturer: Chevrolet

Career
- Debut: 1982
- Races competed: Total: 438; Cup Series: 24; Busch Series: 298; Truck Series: 115; ARCA Racing Series: 1
- Drivers' Championships: Total: 0 Cup Series: 0 Busch Series: 0 Truck Series: 0 ARCA Racing Series: 0
- Race victories: Total: 5 Cup Series: 0 Busch Series: 3 Truck Series: 2 ARCA Racing Series: 0
- Pole positions: Total: 8 Cup Series: 0 Busch Series: 7 Truck Series: 1 ARCA Racing Series: 0

Henderson Motorsports is an American professional stock car racing team that currently competes in the NASCAR Craftsman Truck Series, fielding the No. 75 Chevrolet Silverado part-time for Corey LaJoie, Parker Kligerman, Landon Huffman and Nick Sanchez .

The team previously competed in the Winston Cup Series, Busch Series, and Hooters Pro Cup Series.

== History ==
Previous Henderson Motorsports logo

== Winston Cup Series ==
=== Car No. 26 history ===
The team fielded a part-time car from 1982 to 1984. They would make a combined 24 races with Teague, Ronnie Hopkins, and Morgan Shepherd. Their best finish would be 11th with Teague, and they would shift their sole focus to Busch series racing after the spring Martinsville race in 1984.

==== Drivers ====
Brad Teague (1982)

Ronnie Hopkins (1983)

Morgan Shepherd (1984)

==== Car No. 26 results ====
Year	Driver	No.	Make	1	2	3	4	5	6	7	8	9	10	11	12	13	14	15	16	17	18	19	20	21	22	23	24	25	26	27	28	29	30	Owners	Pts
1982	Brad Teague	26	Chevy	DAY; DNQ	RCH	BRI; 12	ATL; 13	CAR	DAR	NWS; 22	MAR; 11	TAL	NSV; 20		CLT; 24	POC; 25	RSD	MCH	DAY	NSV	POC	TAL	MCH	BRI; 15	DAR	RCH	DOV	NWS	CLT	MAR	CAR	ATL	RSD		
1982	Brad Teague	26	Pontiac											DOV; 25																					
1983	Ronnie Hopkins	26	Buick	DAY; 19	RCH	CAR; 17	ATL; 21	DAR; 30	NWS; 24	MAR; 30	TAL	NSV; 29	DOV; 26	BRI; 17	CLT	RSD	POC; 26	MCH; 17	DAY	NSV	POC	TAL	MCH	BRI; 28	DAR; 40	RCH	DOV	MAR	NWS	CLT	CAR	ATL	RSD		
1984	Morgan Shepherd	26	Buick	DAY	RCH	CAR	ATL	BRI; 27	NWS	DAR	MAR; 26	TAL	NSV	DOV	CLT	RSD	POC	MCH	DAY	NSV	POC	TAL	MCH	BRI	DAR	RCH	DOV	MAR	CLT	NWS	CAR	ATL	RSD		

== Busch Series ==
=== Car No. 5 history ===
The No. 5 was used in the two 1995 and the first 1996 Bristol races by short track ringer and former full-time Henderson Motorsports driver Brad Teague. The 1995 races would see him run alongside the full-time No. 75, while the 1996 race would see him as the only Henderson Motorsports car to make the field. These races would see a best finish of seventh and a worst of 32nd, in the first and last races respectively.

==== Drivers ====
Brad Teague (1995–96)

==== Car No. 5 results ====
Year	Driver	No.	Make	1	2	3	4	5	6	7	8	9	10	11	12	13	14	15	16	17	18	19	20	21	22	23	24	25	26	Owners	Pts
1995	Brad Teague	5	Chevy	DAY	CAR	RCH	ATL	NSV	DAR	BRI; 7	HCY	NHA	NZH	CLT	DOV	MYB	GLN	MLW	TAL	SBO	IRP	MCH	BRI; 20	DAR	RCH	DOV	CLT	CAR	HOM		
1996	Brad Teague	5	Ford	DAY	CAR	RCH	ATL	NSV	DAR	BRI; 32	HCY	NZH	CLT	DOV	SBO	MYB	GLN	MLW	NHA	TAL	IRP	MCH	BRI	DAR	RCH	DOV	CLT	CAR	HOM		

=== Car No. 15 history ===
The No. 15 was first used for Henderson Motorsports' NASCAR debut, a one-race deal for Brad Teague. At the time he was also the driver for their Cup series team which would debut the following day. He finished fourth at the Busch series first trip to Bristol. The number would resurface fifteen years later for another one-race deal, as a second car alongside the main No. 75. With Brad Teague behind the wheel again for the first 1997 Bristol race, he would start and finish 22nd.

==== Drivers ====
Brad Teague (1982, 1997)

==== Car No. 15 results ====
Year	Driver	No.	Make	1	2	3	4	5	6	7	8	9	10	11	12	13	14	15	16	17	18	19	20	21	22	23	24	25	26	27	28	29	30	Owners	Pts
1982	Brad Teague	15	Pontiac	DAY	RCH	BRI; 5	MAR	DAR	HCY	SBO	CRW	RCH	LGY	DOV	HCY	CLT	ASH	HCY	SBO	CAR	CRW	SBO	HCY	LGY	IRP	BRI	HCY	RCH	MAR	CLT	HCY	MAR			
1997	Brad Teague	15	Ford	DAY	CAR	RCH	ATL	LVS	DAR	HCY	TEX	BRI; 22	NSV	TAL	NHA	NZH	CLT	DOV	SBO	GLN	MLW	MYB	GTY	IRP	MCH	BRI	DAR	RCH	DOV	CLT	CAL	CAR	HOM		

=== Car No. 66 history ===
The first time Henderson Motorsports ran a second car was for the second Bristol race in 1988. The number chosen was 66, and it was run by series regular Geoffrey Bodine. After qualifying third, he would have engine issues on lap 159 and finish 25th. No. 66 never appeared again for Henderson, nor did Geoffrey Bodine. Rusty Wallace was supposed to drive the #66 car for this race, but was involved in a crash in Cup practice, and was not able to drive, so the team chose Bodine as a last minute fill-in.

==== Drivers ====
Geoffrey Bodine (1988)

==== Car No. 66 results ====
Year	Driver	No.	Make	1	2	3	4	5	6	7	8	9	10	11	12	13	14	15	16	17	18	19	20	21	22	23	24	25	26	27	28	29	30	Owners	Pts
1988	Geoff Bodine	66	Buick	DAY	HCY	CAR	MAR	DAR	BRI	LNG	NZH	SBO	NSV	CLT	DOV	ROU	LAN	LVL	MYB	OXF	SBO	HCY	LNG	IRP	ROU	BRI; 25	DARl	RCH	DOV	MAR	CLT	CAR	MAR		

=== Car No. 75 history ===
Brad Teague drove the No. 75 Food Country USA Pontiac from 1985 to 1988 in the Busch Grand National Series, picking up one win and two poles, with a best finish of seventh in the final point standings. Rick Wilson drove for the team in 1989, netting two wins and one pole. 1990-91 would see them run part-time with a variety of drivers. These would include returnee Brad Teague, Cup drivers Ernie Irvan and Jimmy Spencer, prospects Ward Burton and Elton Sawyer, journeyman Curtis Markham, and the next full-time Henderson driver in Butch Miller. The best finish from these years was a second from Irvan at IRP in 1990 and a third from Miller at Rougemont in 1991. The 1992 season would be a return to form, as Butch Miller grabbed one pole, four top-five's, and ten top-ten's, including a second at the final race of the season, to finish seventh in the point standings. This tied the best points finish of 7th set by Brad Teague in the team's formative years. 1993 would be a return to being tumultuous. After ten races, Butch Miller was released in favor of Rick Wilson returning. Miller had been eleventh in points, with a pole, two top-five's, and four top-ten's at the time of his dismissal. Wilson would share his seat every so often with one-off drivers, the best of these being a fourth-place effort by Jimmy Hensley.

1994 would see an all-new driver champion the No. 75 car, Doug Heveron. A Whelen Modified regular, the initial year of this experiment would be a mixed bag. He had two top 5 finishes, but had little to no success elsewhere and failed to qualify in three events. He would finish a dismal 27th in points. 1995 would see a paring back from nearly full to part-time racing. The team would re-enlist Rick Wilson for a third time, but by then the magic was lost in the pairing and he would only have two top-ten's to match his amount of DNQs. 1996 would see a return from Heveron, and the team would attempt to run the full schedule. After one top-ten to match two DNQ's a little over halfway in the season, however, the team would move to part-time. They would fail to qualify three of the four races attempted after this point. 1997-2001 would see them enter and make fewer and fewer races as the years passed. The No. 75 would be primarily piloted by Wilson and newcomer Kelly Denton. The best finish for the team during this timeframe would be a fifth at the second 1997 Bristol race, by Rick Wilson. This would turn out to be the final top-five for the No. 75.

2002-03 would be a last hurrah for the No. 75 team. The team would sign Butch Miller on for an extended part-time schedule, the first time Miller had driven for the No. 75 since the 1993 season. The team would make all but one of their scheduled races, with a best finish of fifteenth at the first Bristol race. 2003 would see the team hiring Jay Sauter and increasing their schedule for the final time. Again only failing to make one race, this time the Daytona opener, the team would go from seven to ten made races. Sauter would be up and down throughout the year but would record the team's final top-ten with a ninth at Nashville. 2004 would limit Sauter and the No. 75 to six made races out of seven attempts and their last top-fifteen at Richmond. The next three years would see them make only one race a year, and a crash at the first Bristol race of 2007 would mark the end of the No. 75 in the Busch Series. Brad Teague, the team's first-ever driver in 1982 with the No. 15 and for the No. 75 in 1985, would end up competing in its last race as well while driving for Jimmy Means Racing.

==== Drivers ====
Brad Teague (1985–88, 1990, 1996, 2001)

Rick Wilson (1989, 1993, 1995, 1997)

Butch Miller (1989, 1991–93, 2002)

Ernie Irvan (1990)

Jimmy Spencer (1990)

Ward Burton (1991)

Elton Sawyer (1991)

Curtis Markham (1991)

Scott Lagasse (1993)

Glenn Jarrett (1993)

Jimmy Hensley (1993)

Jim Bown (1993)

Doug Heveron (1994, 1996)

Johnny Rumley (DNQ'd 2 races in 1996)

Kelly Denton (1998–2000)

Scott Hansen (2001)

Randy Ratliff (DNQ'd 2 attempts in 2001)

Jay Sauter (2003–05)

Caleb Holman (2006–07)

==== Car No. 75 results ====
Year	Driver	No.	Make	1	2	3	4	5	6	7	8	9	10	11	12	13	14	15	16	17	18	19	20	21	22	23	24	25	26	27	28	29	30	31	32	33	34	35	Owners	Pts
1985	Brad Teague	75	Pontiac	DAY; 30	CAR; 12	HCY; 16	BRI; 27	MAR; 23	DAR; 2	SBO; 14	LGY; 6	DOV; 25	CLT; 28	SBO; 7	HCY; 14	ROU; 22	IRP; 30	SBO; 20	LGY	HCY; 13	MLW	BRI; 22	DAR; 3	RCH; 20	NWS; 8	ROU	CLT; 7	HCY; 9	CAR; 15	MAR; 21										
1986	Brad Teague	75	Pontiac	DAY; 29	CAR; 7	HCY; 6	MAR; 7	BRI; 3	DAR; 6	SBO; 12	LGY; 13	JFC; 11	DOV; 7	CLT; 7	SBO; 12	HCY; 11	ROU; 8	IRP; 10	SBO; 17	RAL	OXF	SBO					DAR; 8	RCH	DOV	MAR	ROU	CLT; 35	CAR	MAR						
1986	Brad Teague	75	Chevy																				HCY; 22	LGY	ROU	BRI; 11														
1987	Brad Teague	75	Pontiac	DAY; 7			DAR; 12				CLT; 17	DOV; 10							RAL; 9			BRI; 12		DAR; 17		DOV; 8		CLT; 11	CAR; 14	MAR; 9										
1987	Brad Teague	75	Chevy		HCY; 15	MAR; 1*		BRI; 18	LGY; 13	SBO; 6			IRP; 29	ROU; 18	JFC; 9	OXF; 23	SBO; 20	HCY; 12		LGY; 11	ROU; 9		JFC; 9		RCH; 28		MAR; 24													
1988	Brad Teague	75	Olds	DAY; 40	HCY	CAR; 29	MAR	DAR; 34	BRI; 10	LNG	NZH; 12	SBO	NSV	CLT; 34	DOV; 5	ROU	LAN	LVL	MYB; 8	OXF	SBO	HCY	LNG	IRP	ROU	BRI; 11	DAR; 10	RCH	DOV; 11*	MAR; 32	CLT; 39	CAR; 18	MAR; 8							
1989	Rick Wilson	75	Olds	DAY; 6	CAR; 27	MAR; 21*	HCY	DAR; 5	BRI; 1*	NZH; 26	SBO	LAN	NSV	CLT; 42	DOV; 1*	ROU	LVL	VOL	MYB	SBO	HCY	DUB	IRP	ROU	BRI; 30	DAR; 34	RCH; 24	DOV		CLT; 28	CAR	MAR								
1989	Butch Miller	75	Olds																										MAR; 9											
1990	Brad Teague	75	Olds	DAY; 31	RCH	CAR; 24	MAR	HCY	DAR; 15	BRI	LAN; 16	SBO; 22	NZH	HCY																										
1990	Ernie Irvan	75	Olds												CLT; 40	DOV; 26	ROU	VOL	MYB	OXF	NHA	SBO	DUB	IRP; 2	ROU	BRI; 27	DAR; 34	RCH												
1990	Jimmy Spencer	75	Olds																										DOV; 26	MAR; 6	CLT; 19	NHA	CAR; DNQ	MAR; 18						
1991	Ward Burton	75	Olds	DAY; DNQ	RCH; 34	CAR; 26	MAR; 9	VOL; 24	HCY		BRI; 29			NZH; 12		DOV; 4	ROU; 13																							
1991	Ward Burton	75	Chevy							DAR; 33					CLT; 9																									
1991	Ward Burton	75	Buick									LAN; 10	SBO; 29																											
1991	Elton Sawyer	75	Olds															HCY; 24																						
1991	Curtis Markham	75	Olds																MYB; 22	GLN; 8																				
1991	Butch Miller	75	Olds																		OXF; 22	NHA	SBO; 10	DUB; 10	IRP; 15	ROU; 3	BRI; 10	DAR; 21	RCH; 22	DOV; 12	CLT; DNQ	NHA; 6		MAR; 11						
1991	Butch Miller	75	Chevy																														CAR; 12							
1992	Butch Miller	75	Olds	DAY; 22	CAR; 15	RCH; 30	ATL; 15	MAR; 7	DAR; 3	BRI; 23	HCY; 9	LAN; 16	DUB; 21	NZH; 12	CLT; 17	DOV; 7	ROU; 8	MYB; 16	GLN; 8	VOL; 16	NHA; 19	TAL; 25	IRP; 4	ROU; 18	MCH; 24	NHA; 11	BRI; 10	DAR; 23	RCH; 25	DOV; 22		MAR; 3	CAR; 19	HCY; 2						
1992	Butch Miller	75	Chevy																												CLT; 13									
1993	Butch Miller	75	Chevy	DAY; 12									CLT; 15																											
1993	Butch Miller	75	Olds		CAR; 9	RCH; 10	DAR; 37	BRI; 28	HCY; 14	ROU; 5	MAR; 20	NZH; 5																												
1993	Rick Wilson	75	Olds											DOV; 36	MYB							BRI; 10		RCH; 16	DOV; 28															
1993	Rick Wilson	75	Chevy															TAL; 39	IRP	MCH; 5	NHA		DAR; 37				CLT; 39				ATL; 41									
1993	Scott Lagasse	75	Olds													GLN; 31	MLW																							
1993	Glenn Jarrett	75	Olds																							ROU; 13														
1993	Jimmy Hensley	75	Olds																									MAR; 4	CAR											
1993	Jim Bown	75	Olds																											HCY; 29										
1994	Doug Heveron	75	Chevy	DAY; 41	CAR		ATL; 42						NHA; 40	NZH; 40	CLT; DNQ	DOV	MYB; 15	GLN	MLW; 41	SBO; 32	TAL; 16	HCY; 4	IRP; 13	MCH; 13		DAR; 35	RCH	DOV; 19	CLT; 40	MAR; 17	CAR; 26									
1994	Doug Heveron	75	Olds			RCH; 39		MAR; 5	DAR; 22	HCY; 23	BRI; DNQ	ROU; 30													BRI; DNQ															
1995	Rick Wilson	75	Ford	DAY; 17	CAR	RCH	ATL; 9	NSV; 13	DAR; 14	BRI; 27	HCY	NHA; 43	NZH	CLT; 32	DOV	MYB	GLN	MLW	TAL; 8	SBO	IRP	MCH; 41	BRI; 32	DAR; 22	RCH; 21	DOV; 38	CLT; DNQ	CAR; DNQ	HOM											
1996	Doug Heveron	75	Ford	DAY; 46	CAR; 27	RCH; 14	ATL; DNQ	NSV; 13	DAR; 20	BRI; DNQ	HCY; 24	NZH; 22	CLT; 37	DOV; 25	SBO; 13	MYB; 26	GLN; 20	MLW; 6	NHA; 17	TAL	IRP	MCH	BRI; DNQ	DAR	RCH	DOV														
1996	Johnny Rumley	75	Ford																								CLT; DNQ	CAR; DNQ	HOM											
1997	Rick Wilson	75	Chevy	DAY	CAR	RCH	ATL; 19	LVS	DAR; 36	HCY	TEX	BRI; 27	NSV; 36	TAL	NHA	NZH	CLT; 18	DOV	SBO	GLN	MLW	MYB	GTY	IRP	MCH	BRI; 5	DAR; DNQ	RCH	DOV	CLT; 36	CAL	CAR; DNQ	HOM							
1998	Kelly Denton	75	Chevy	DAY	CAR	LVS	NSV	DAR	BRI; 33	TEX	HCY	TAL	NHA	NZH	CLT; DNQ	DOV	RCH	PPR	GLN	MLW	MYB	CAL	SBO; DNQ	IRP	MCH	BRI; 43	DAR; DNQ	RCH	DOV	CLT; DNQ	GTY	CAR	ATL	HOM						
1999	Kelly Denton	75	Chevy	DAY; DNQ	CAR	LVS	ATL	DAR	TEX	NSV	BRI; DNQ	TAL; 20	CAL	NHA	RCH	NZH	CLT; 41	DOV	SBO	GLN	MLW	MYB	PPR	GTY	IRP	MCH	BRI; DNQ	DAR; 34	RCH	DOV; DNQ	CLT; DNQ	CAR; 22	MEM; DNQ	PHO	HOM					
2000	Kelly Denton	75	Chevy	DAY; 38	CAR	LVS	ATL	DAR	BRI; 15	TEX	NSV; DNQ	TAL; DNQ	CAL	RCH	NHA	CLT	DOV	SBO	MYB	GLN	MLW	NZH	PPR	GTY	IRP	MCH	BRI; 34	DAR	RCH	DOV	CLT	CAR	MEM	PHO						
2001	Brad Teague	75	Chevy	DAY	CAR	LVS	ATL	DAR	BRI; 32	TEX	NSH	TAL	CAL	RCH	NHA	NZH	CLT	DOV	KEN	MLW	GLN	CHI	GTY	PPR	IRP	MCH														
2001	Randy Ratliff	75	Chevy																								BRI; DNQ	DAR	RCH; DNQ	DOV	KAN	CLT								
2001	Scott Hansen	75	Chevy																														MEM; 37	PHO	CAR; DNQ	HOM				
2002	Butch Miller	75	Chevy	DAY	CAR	LVS	DAR; 33	BRI; 15	TEX	NSH; 21	TAL	CAL	RCH; 19	NHA	NZH	CLT	DOV	NSH; 16	KEN; 18	MLW	DAY; 32	CHI	GTY	PPR	IRP; 34	MCH	BRI; 22	DAR	RCH; DNQ	DOV	KAN	CLT	MEM; 31	ATL	CAR	PHO	HOM			
2003	Jay Sauter	75	Chevy	DAY; DNQ	CAR	LVS	DAR	BRI; 36	TEX	TAL	NSH; 24	CAL	RCH; 40	GTY	NZH	CLT	DOV	NSH; 9	KEN; 40	MLW; 17	DAY	CHI	NHA	PPR	IRP	MCH	BRI; 40	DAR	RCH; 26	DOV	KAN	CLT	MEM; 13	ATL	PHO	CAR; 28	HOM			
2004	Jay Sauter	75	Chevy	DAY	CAR	LVS	DAR	BRI; 39	TEX	NSH; 36	TAL	CAL	GTY	RCH; 13	NZH	CLT	DOV	NSH; 16	KEN; 40	MLW	DAY	CHI	NHA	PPR	IRP	MCH	BRI; 31	CAL	RCH; DNQ	DOV	KAN	CLT	MEM	ATL	PHO	DAR	HOM			
2005	Jay Sauter	75	Chevy	DAY	CAL	MXC	LVS	ATL	NSH	BRI; DNQ	TEX	PHO	TAL	DAR	RCH	CLT	DOV	NSH	KEN	MLW	DAY	CHI	NHA	PPR	GTY	IRP	GLN	MCH	BRI; 40	CAL	RCH	DOV	KAN	CLT	MEM	TEX	PHO	HOM		
2006	Caleb Holman	75	Chevy	DAY	CAL	MXC	LVS	ATL	BRI; DNQ	TEX	NSH	PHO	TAL	RCH; 33	DAR; DNQ	CLT	DOV	NSH	KEN	MLW	DAY	CHI	NHA	MAR	GTY	IRP	GLN	MCH	BRI; DNQ	CAL	RCH	DOV	KAN	CLT	MEM	TEX	PHO	HOM		
2007	Caleb Holman	75	Chevy	DAY	CAL	MXC	LVS	ATL	BRI; 42	NSH	TEX	PHO	TAL	RCH	DAR	CLT	DOV	NSH	KEN	MLW	NHA	DAY	CHI	GTY	IRP	CGV	GLN	MCH	BRI	CAL	RCH	DOV	KAN	CLT	MEM	TEX	PHO	HOM		

=== Car No. 77 history ===
The second 1992 Bristol race would see the introduction of the No. 77. It was run by Rick Wilson, a former full-time driver in the No. 75. He would race with and beat the main No. 75, piloted then by Butch Miller, finishing sixth to his tenth. The number would return almost four years later to the day to be run by Brad Teague. Unlike four years prior, this entry would be the only Henderson entry in the race, as the No. 75 had failed to qualify. After starting on the front row, he would finish nineteenth.

==== Drivers ====
Rick Wilson (1992)

Brad Teague (1996)

==== Car No. 77 results ====
Year	Driver	No.	Make	1	2	3	4	5	6	7	8	9	10	11	12	13	14	15	16	17	18	19	20	21	22	23	24	25	26	27	28	29	30	31	Owners	Pts
1992	Rick Wilson	77	Olds	DAY	CAR	RCH	ATL	MAR	DAR	BRI	HCY	LAN	DUB	NZH	CLT	DOV	ROU	MYB	GLN	VOL	NHA	TAL	IRP	ROU	MCH	NHA	BRI; 6	DAR	RCH	DOV	CLT	MAR	CAR	HCY		
1996	Brad Teague	77	Ford	DAY	CAR	RCH	ATL	NSV	DAR	BRI	HCY	NZH	CLT	DOV	SBO	MYB	GLN	MLW	NHA	TAL	IRP	MCH	BRI; 19	DAR	RCH	DOV	CLT	CAR	HOM							

== Truck Series ==
=== Truck No. 75 history ===
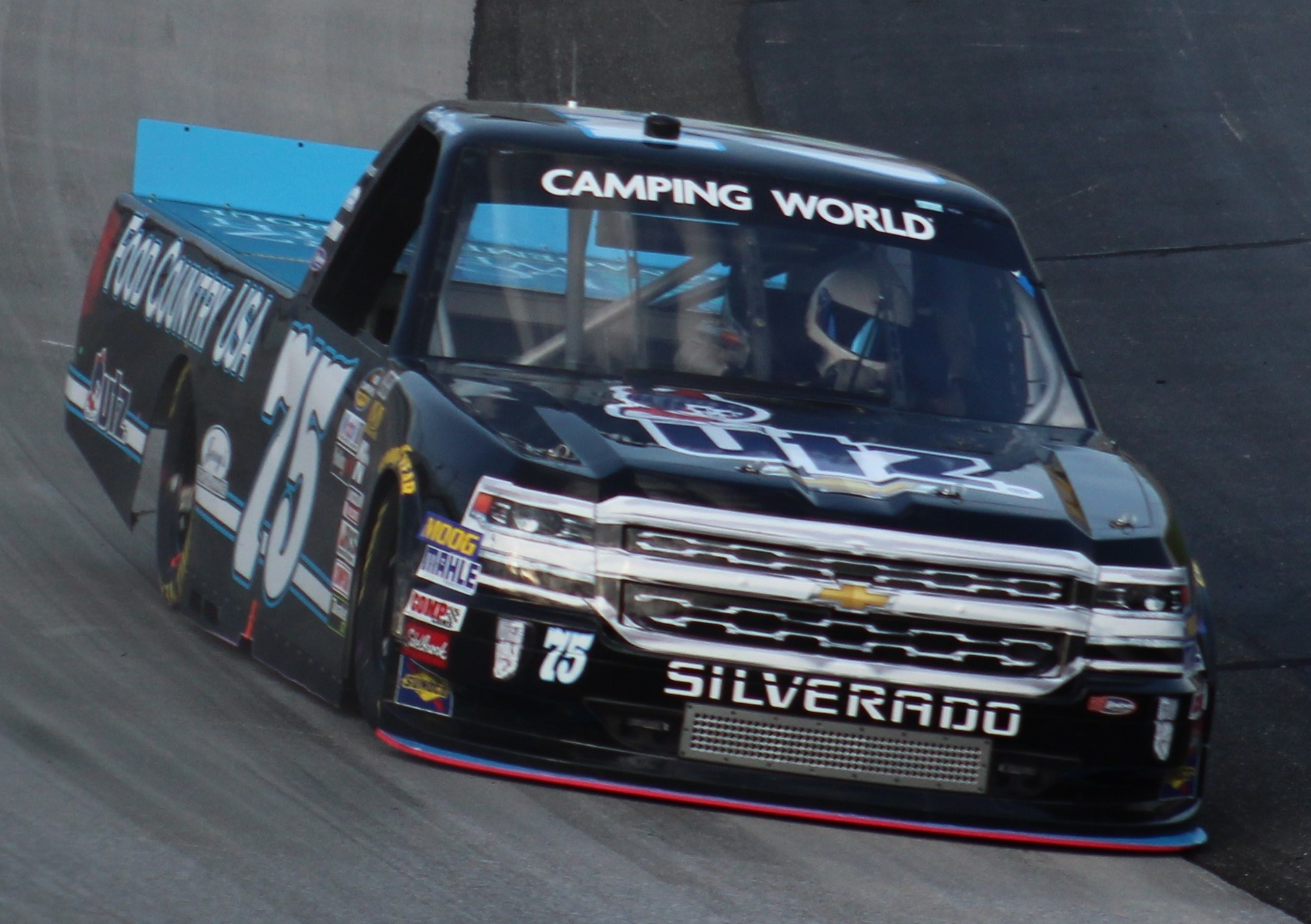
Parker Kligerman in the No. 75 at Dover International Speedway in 2018

After not attempting any NASCAR races for five years, the team entered the NASCAR Camping World Truck Series in 2012, fielding the No. 75 truck for Caleb Holman. Holman won the pole position for the Eldora race in 2016. During these five seasons, the team would make 32 races and accumulate two top-ten's in the latter half. All of these races were run by Holman, who would be a consistent finisher during his tenure as the sole driver.

In 2017, the No. 75 attempted ten races in the Truck Series. Parker Kligerman attempted eight races while Holman attempted two races. Kligerman got the team's first victory at Talladega Superspeedway. After the Eldora race, Holman would retire from NASCAR racing to focus on becoming a leader at his church. His last start would see him qualify in the top-ten but finish 32nd after transmission issues took him out on lap twelve.

In 2018, Henderson Motorsports and Kligerman planned to run eight-ten races in the 2018 season. They would end up on the lower end of that spectrum. The team did record their first non-restrictor-plate race top 5, a 4th at Bristol, but would also crash out of three races.

2019-20 would see Kligerman make eleven races, with another top-five in the same position and at the same race as the first one, coming in 2020.

For 2021, it was announced that defending ARCA Menards Series East champion Sam Mayer would be joining the returning Kligerman in driving the No. 75 for the team. The first of Mayer's seven-race schedule with Henderson will come at the Daytona Road Course, the only race of his schedule announced so far. Kligerman's schedule has also yet to be announced except for the season-opener at Daytona. As of May 6, 2021, Mayer has made one start and Kligerman three. While Mayer crashed out of his only start thus far, Kligerman has recorded two top 10's and three top 15's after failing to qualify at Daytona. He returned to make his fourth start at Darlington after the team skipped two races. At the United Rentals 176 at The Glen, sponsor Fast announced that if Kligerman finished top five in the race, they would sell their hoodies for $1 online. Kligerman was fifth when the race was shortened due to rain, so Fast did indeed sell their hoodies online for only $1. The next race Kligerman ran, the In It To Win It 200, he scored his only other top five of 2021 with a fifth-place finish.

Starting off 2022 in the NextEra Energy 250, Kligerman gave the race-winning push to Zane Smith and finished fifth. The team would race again at COTA finishing 19th and then 16th at Martinsville. They would show up the next two races after that being Bristol Dirt and Darlington, and they finished fourth and sixth. They would race next at Sonoma finishing 7th. Their 7th race of the season would be Nashville Superspeedway where they started 23rd and finished twentieth. Then heading to Mid-Ohio where they would get their second win with Parker Kligerman and their second win in the last decade beating out Zane Smith. Their next two races would be eleventh at Kansas and third at Bristol.

On February 14, 2025, Kligerman unofficially won the season opener at Daytona, but later failed post race inspection for the truck being too low. Corey Heim, who originally finished 2nd, was credited with the win while Kligerman was relegated to last. On May 2, 2025, the team announced Patrick Emerling would compete for the team at North Wilkesboro.

==== Truck No. 75 results ====
Year	Driver	No.	Make	1	2	3	4	5	6	7	8	9	10	11	12	13	14	15	16	17	18	19	20	21	22	23	24	25	NCTC	Pts
2012	Caleb Holman	75	Chevy	DAY	MAR; DNQ	CAR; 21	KAN	CLT; 21	DOV; 18	TEX	KEN; 21	IOW; 18	CHI	POC	MCH	BRI; 19	ATL; 27	IOW	KEN	LVS	TAL	MAR; 24	TEX	PHO	HOM				33rd	183
2013	Caleb Holman	75	Chevy	DAY	MAR; 21	CAR; 29	KAN	CLT; 33	DOV; 20	TEX	KEN	IOW	ELD	POC	MCH	BRI; 17	MSP	IOW	CHI	LVS	TAL; 30	MAR; 23	TEX	PHO	HOM				37th	135
2014	Caleb Holman	75	Chevy	DAY; 27	MAR; 22	KAN	CLT	DOV	TEX	GTW	KEN; 23	IOW	ELD	POC	MCH	BRI; 15	MSP	CHI	NHA	LVS	TAL	MAR; 11	TEX	PHO	HOM				35th	122
2015	Caleb Holman	75	Chevy	DAY	ATL; 17	MAR; 21	KAN	CLT; 24	DOV	TEX	GTW	IOW; 14	KEN; 27	ELD	POC	MCH	BRI; 31	MSP	CHI	NHA	LVS	TAL	MAR; 8	TEX	PHO	HOM			32nd	166
2016	Caleb Holman	75	Toyota	DAY	ATL; 9	MAR	KAN	DOV	CLT; DNQ	TEX; 16						BRI; 15	MCH	MSP	CHI	NHA	LVS								34th	69
2016	Caleb Holman	75	Chevy								IOW; 26	GTW	KEN	ELD; 30	POC														34th	69
2016	Parker Kligerman	75	Toyota																			TAL; DNQ	MAR	TEX	PHO	HOM			34th	69
2017	Parker Kligerman	75	Toyota	DAY; DNQ	ATL; 31			CLT; 10	DOV; 21	TEX	GTW	IOW	KEN; 7				BRI; 8	MSP; 8	CHI	NHA	LVS	TAL; 1	MAR	TEX	PHO	HOM			29th	204
2017	Caleb Holman	75	Chevy			MAR; 22	KAN							ELD; 32	POC	MCH													29th	204
2018	Parker Kligerman	75	Chevy	DAY; 28	ATL; 11	LVS	MAR	DOV; 28	KAN	CLT; 7	TEX	IOW	GTW	CHI	KEN; 27	ELD	POC	MCH	BRI; 4	MSP	LVS	TAL; 28	MAR; 16	TEX	PHO	HOM			29th	172
2019	Parker Kligerman	75	Chevy	DAY	ATL; 20	LVS	MAR	TEX	DOV	KAN	CLT	TEX	IOW	GTW	CHI	KEN	POC	ELD	MCH	BRI; 13	MSP	LVS	TAL	MAR	PHO	HOM; 10			41st	72
2020	Parker Kligerman	75	Chevy	DAY	LVS	CLT; DNQ	ATL; DNQ	HOM	POC; 15	KEN; 18	TEX	KAN	KAN	MCH; 9	DRC; 8	DOV; 34	GTW	DAR	RCH	BRI; 4	LVS	TAL	KAN; 15	TEX	MAR; 24	PHO			34th	175
2021	Parker Kligerman	75	Chevy	DAY; DNQ		LVS; 8	ATL; 14	BRD; 8	RCH	KAN	DAR; 26	COA; 13	CLT	TEX	NSH; 17	POC	KNX	GLN; 5	GTW	DAR; 5			TAL; 37						31st	254
2021	Sam Mayer	75	Chevy		DRC; 37																								31st	254
2021	Parker Kligerman	75	Toyota																		BRI; 21	LVS		MAR; 6	PHO				31st	254
2022	Parker Kligerman	75	Chevy	DAY; 5	LVS	ATL	COA; 19	MAR; 16	BRD; 4						SON; 7	KNO		MOH; 1*	POC	IRP	RCH			TAL; 9					19th	400
2022	Parker Kligerman	75	Toyota							DAR; 6	KAN	TEX	CLT	GTW			NSH; 20					KAN; 11	BRI; 3		HOM; 9	PHO			19th	400
2023	Parker Kligerman	75	Chevy	DAY; 32	LVS	ATL	COA; 31	TEX	BRD; 31	MAR	KAN	DAR; 34	NWS; DNQ	CLT	GTW	NSH	MOH	POC; 22	RCH	IRP	MLW	KAN	BRI; 18	TAL; 9	HOM				38th	114
2023	Sean Hingorani	75	Chevy																							PHO; 26			38th	114
2024	Stefan Parsons	75	Chevy	DAY; 6	ATL	LVS	BRI; 18	COA; 19	MAR	TEX; 9	KAN	DAR	NWS; 17	CLT; 25	GTW	NSH; 26	POC	IRP	RCH; 11	MLW	BRI; 16	KAN	TAL; 8						31st	234
2024	Connor Zilisch	75	Chevy																					HOM; 18	MAR	PHO			31st	234
2025	Parker Kligerman	75	Chevy	DAY; 36	ATL	LVS	HOM	MAR	BRI; 14	CAR; 25	TEX	KAN		CLT; 14	NSH	MCH	POC	LRP	IRP	GLN; 31	RCH	DAR	BRI; 14	NHA	ROV; 35	TAL; 26	MAR	PHO	34th	124
2025	Patrick Emerling	75	Chevy										NWS; 19																34th	124
2026	Corey LaJoie	75	Chevy	DAY; 34	ATL	STP	DAR	CAR	BRI	TEX	GLN	DOV	CLT	NSH	MCH														39th	51
2026	Parker Kligerman	75	Chevy													COR; 18	LRP												39th	51
2026	Landon Huffman	75	Chevy															NWS; DNQ	IRP	RCH	NHA								39th	51
2026	Nick Sanchez	75	Chevy																			BRI; 20	KAN	CLT	PHO	TAL	MAR	HOM	39th	51

== ARCA Series ==
=== Car No. 75 history ===
In 1985, the team fielded the No. 75 Pontiac for Brad Teague at Indianapolis Raceway Park. He finished 30th due to oil pressure.

==== Car No. 75 results ====
Year	Driver	No.	Make	1	2	3	4	5	6	7	8	9	10	11	12	13	14	Owners	Pts
1985	Brad Teague	75	Pontiac	ATL	DAY	ATL	TAL	ATL	SSP	IRP; 30	CSP	FRS	IRP	OEF	ISF	DSF	TOL		
