= Caleb Holman =

American stock car racing driver

- Born: Caleb Darrell Holman; January 7, 1984 (age 42); Abingdon, Virginia, U.S.
- Achievements: 2014 Pro Cup Series champion

NASCAR O'Reilly Auto Parts Series career
- 5 races run over 4 years
- 2007 position: 154th
- Best finish: 108th (2003)
- First race: 2003 Hardee's 250 (Richmond)
- Last race: 2007 Sharpie Mini 300 (Bristol)
Wins	Top tens	Poles
0	0	0

NASCAR FedEx Freight Truck Series career
- 34 races run over 6 years
- 2017 position: 61st
- Best finish: 30th (2012, 2015)
- First race: 2012 Good Sam Roadside Assistance Carolina 200 (Rockingham)
- Last race: 2017 Eldora Dirt Derby (Eldora)
Wins	Top tens	Poles
0	2	1
- Statistics up to date as of July 19, 2017.

Caleb Darrell Holman (born January 7, 1984) is an American former professional stock car racing driver. He last competed part-time in the NASCAR Camping World Truck Series, driving the No. 75 Toyota Tundra and Chevrolet Silverado for Henderson Motorsports.

== Racing career ==
=== Early years ===
The son of an amateur racer, Holman started racing by running go-karts and late models during his teenage years, culminating with two ARCA Racing Series starts at age nineteen.

=== X-1R Pro Cup ===
Starting in 2007, Holman raced mainly in the Pro Cup Series. He collected his first win in 2008 on his way to a sixth-place points finish. In 2009, Holman secured three poles in twelve races but could not close the deal in any of them. A dominant 2010 season ensued in which he won four races and finished runner-up, the closest finish yet to a championship. Holman backed up those results in 2011 when he led all but five races and recorded top tens in all but three. The efforts were scaled back in 2012 as Holman started to move up to the NASCAR Camping World Truck Series. In 2013, he won two races while running half the fourteen-race schedule. Returning to the series full-time in 2014, Holman won half the races, including the final four to win the championship. He earned almost $70,000 for that championship.

=== NASCAR ===
Holman started racing in the NASCAR Busch Grand National (now Xfinity) series in 2003. He attempted five races, qualified for two and finished one, at the Milwaukee Mile. He then made one race for Ortec Racing in 2004. He then teamed up with Henderson Motorsports for the first time two years later, attempting five races and qualifying for one. His one attempt with the team in 2007 ended in a crash.

Starting in 2012, Holman rekindled his relationship with Henderson to run a partial Camping World Truck Series schedule, mostly on short tracks. In 2013, Holman branched out to superspeedways, running for Henderson in the race at Talladega Superspeedway, but he crashed out, though he ran well on short tracks. Once again entering a restrictor plate race and short track races, Holman almost made the top ten at Martinsville Speedway in 2014. He was running in the top ten, but contact with David Starr resulted in a flat tire. Continuing his partial schedule in 2015, Holman recorded his first top ten at Martinsville with sponsorship from Tide Pods. He recorded his first intermediate track top ten in 2015, and won time trials at Eldora, but was wrecked by Stewart Friesen. Holman announced his retirement from NASCAR events via Facebook on September 19, 2017 to become a leader at his church.

== Motorsports career results ==
=== NASCAR ===
(key) (Bold – Pole position awarded by qualifying time. Italics – Pole position earned by points standings or practice time. * – Most laps led.)

==== Busch Series ====
NASCAR Busch Series results
Year	Team	No.	Make	1	2	3	4	5	6	7	8	9	10	11	12	13	14	15	16	17	18	19	20	21	22	23	24	25	26	27	28	29	30	31	32	33	34	35	NBSC	Pts	Ref
2003	Holman Motorsports	78	Chevy	DAY	CAR	LVS	DAR	BRI	TEX	TAL	NSH	CAL	RCH; 32	GTY	NZH	CLT	DOV	NSH	KEN	MLW; 29	DAY	CHI	NHA	PPR	IRP	MCH	BRI; DNQ	DAR; DNQ	RCH	DOV	KAN	CLT	MEM	ATL	PHO	CAR; DNQ	HOM		108th	143	
2004	Ortec Racing	96	Chevy	DAY	CAR	LVS	DAR	BRI	TEX	NSH; 28	TAL	CAL	GTY	RCH	NZH	CLT	DOV	NSH	KEN	MLW	DAY	CHI	NHA	PPR	IRP	MCH	BRI; DNQ	CAL	RCH	DOV	KAN	CLT	MEM	ATL	PHO	DAR	HOM		127th	75	
2006	Henderson Motorsports	75	Chevy	DAY	CAL	MXC	LVS	ATL	BRI; DNQ	TEX	NSH	PHO	TAL	RCH; 33	DAR; DNQ	CLT	DOV	NSH	KEN	MLW	DAY	CHI	NHA	MAR	GTY	IRP	GLN	MCH	BRI; DNQ	CAL	RCH	DOV	KAN	CLT	MEM	TEX	PHO	HOM	130th	64	
2007	Henderson Motorsports	75	Chevy	DAY	CAL	MXC	LVS	ATL	BRI; 42	NSH	TEX	PHO	TAL	RCH	DAR	CLT	DOV	NSH	KEN	MLW	NHA	DAY	CHI	GTY	IRP	CGV	GLN	MCH	BRI	CAL	RCH	DOV	KAN	CLT	MEM	TEX	PHO	HOM	154th	37	

==== Camping World Truck Series ====
NASCAR Camping World Truck Series results
Year	Team	No.	Make	1	2	3	4	5	6	7	8	9	10	11	12	13	14	15	16	17	18	19	20	21	22	23	NCWTC	Pts	Ref
2012	Henderson Motorsports	75	Chevy	DAY	MAR; DNQ	CAR; 21	KAN	CLT; 21	DOV; 18	TEX	KEN; 21	IOW; 18	CHI	POC	MCH	BRI; 19	ATL; 27	IOW	KEN	LVS	TAL	MAR; 24	TEX	PHO	HOM		30th	183	
2013	Henderson Motorsports	75	Chevy	DAY	MAR; 21	CAR; 29	KAN	CLT; 33	DOV; 20	TEX	KEN	IOW	ELD	POC	MCH	BRI; 17	MSP	IOW	CHI	LVS	TAL; 30	MAR; 23	TEX	PHO	HOM		34th	135	
2014	Henderson Motorsports	75	Chevy	DAY; 27	MAR; 22	KAN	CLT	DOV	TEX	GTW	KEN; 23	IOW	ELD	POC	MCH	BRI; 15	MSP	CHI	NHA	LVS	TAL	MAR; 11	TEX	PHO	HOM		38th	122	
2015	Henderson Motorsports	75	Chevy	DAY	ATL; 17	MAR; 21	KAN	CLT; 24	DOV	TEX	GTW	IOW; 14	KEN; 27	ELD	POC	MCH	BRI; 31	MSP	CHI	NHA	LVS	TAL	MAR; 8	TEX	PHO	HOM	30th	166	
2016	Henderson Motorsports	75	Toyota	DAY	ATL; 9	MAR	KAN	DOV	CLT; DNQ	TEX; 16						BRI; 15	MCH	MSP	CHI	NHA	LVS	TAL	MAR	TEX	PHO	HOM	32nd	69	
2016	Henderson Motorsports	75	Chevy								IOW; 26	GTW	KEN	**ELD**; 30	POC												32nd	69	
2017	Henderson Motorsports	75	Chevy	DAY	ATL	MAR; 22	KAN	CLT	DOV	TEX	GTW	IOW	KEN	ELD; 32	POC	MCH	BRI	MSP	CHI	NHA	LVS	TAL	MAR	TEX	PHO	HOM	61st	20	

==== K&N Pro Series East ====
NASCAR K&N Pro Series East results
Year	Team	No.	Make	1	2	3	4	5	6	7	8	9	10	11	12	13	14	NKNPSEC	Pts	Ref
2016	Martin-McClure Racing	75	Chevy	NSM	MOB	GRE	BRI; 21	VIR	DOM	STA	COL	NHA	IOW	GLN	GRE	NJM	DOV	56th	23	
2017	J. P. Morgan	23	Chevy	NSM; 11	GRE	BRI	SBO	SBO	MEM	BLN	TMP	NHA	IOW	GLN	LGY	NJM	DOV	52nd	33	

==== Goody's Dash Series ====
NASCAR Goody's Dash Series results
Year	Team	No.	Make	1	2	3	4	5	6	7	8	NGDS	Pts	Ref
2003	N/A	52	Pontiac	DAY	OGL	CLT; DNQ	SBO	GRE	KEN	BRI	ATL	63rd	34	

=== ARCA Re/Max Series ===
(key) (Bold – Pole position awarded by qualifying time. Italics – Pole position earned by points standings or practice time. * – Most laps led.)

ARCA Re/Max Series results
Year	Team	No.	Make	1	2	3	4	5	6	7	8	9	10	11	12	13	14	15	16	17	18	19	20	21	22	ARMC	Pts	Ref
2003	Holman Motorsports	71	Chevy	DAY	ATL	NSH; 18	SLM	TOL	KEN	CLT; 24	BLN	KAN	MCH	LER	POC	POC	NSH	ISF	WIN	DSF	CHI	SLM	TAL	CLT	SBO	104th	250	

=== CARS Late Model Stock Car Tour ===
(key) (Bold – Pole position awarded by qualifying time. Italics – Pole position earned by points standings or practice time. * – Most laps led. ** – All laps led.)

CARS Late Model Stock Car Tour results
Year	Team	No.	Make	1	2	3	4	5	6	7	8	9	10	CLMSCTC	Pts	Ref
2015	LMR Motorsports	11	Chevy	SNM	ROU	HCY	SNM	TCM	MMS; 7	ROU	CON	MYB	HCY	41st	26	
