= GasBuddy =

Tech company

- Logo used since 2017
- Company type: Subsidiary
- Founded: June 11, 2000; 26 years ago Minneapolis, Minnesota, U.S.
- Founders: Dustin Coupal; Jason Toews
- Headquarters: 14241 Dallas Parkway, Dallas, Texas, U.S.
- Area served: United States and Canada
- Key people: Patrick De Haan (Head of Petroleum Analysis)
- Products: Business Pages
- Parent: PDI Technologies
- Website: https://gasbuddy.com/

GasBuddy is a technology company headquartered in Dallas, United States, that offers mobile applications and websites for tracking crowd-sourced locations and prices of gas stations and convenience stores in the United States and Canada. Their platforms offer information sourced from users, gas station operators, and partner companies. They also provide business-to-business services to gas stations and convenience store owners.

== History ==
GasBuddy was founded in Minneapolis in 2000 by Dustin Coupal, Jason Toews as a community website for sharing gas prices.

In 2004, they filed as a for-profit corporation in Minnesota under the name GasBuddy Organization Inc.

In 2009, GasBuddy launched OpenStore, a platform that allows convenience stores to build and manage their own mobile apps.

In 2010, the company launched its own mobile apps that allowed users to input gas prices from their smartphones.

In 2013, Oil Price Information Service (OPIS), a subsidiary of UCG, acquired GasBuddy. OPIS is a provider of petroleum pricing and news for businesses.

In 2016, IHS acquired OPIS, separating from GasBuddy, which remained with UCG as a subsidiary company.

Initially only available in the United States and Canada, GasBuddy launched in Australia in March 2016. Also in that year, GasBuddy released a completely redesigned app, its first major redesign since its release in 2010. GasBuddy also unveiled a new logo and launched GasBuddy Business Pages. GasBuddy shut down the Australian version of their app in 2022.

In 2017, GasBuddy launched a gas savings program titled "Pay with GasBuddy" intended to let consumers save at gas stations in the United States.

In the same year, GasBuddy was involved in a lawsuit with Reveal Mobile, a location-based marketing company, over the sale of user location data. It was revealed that GasBuddy sold information on more than 4.5 million users to Reveal each month for $9.50 per 1000 users. According to CNET, that information included "users' latitude, longitude, IP address, and time stamps on the data collected," which sparked concern in the media and between its users.

In 2021, the GasBuddy app rose to the most popular app on both Android and iPhone platforms in the wake of the Colonial Pipeline ransomware attack

PDI acquired GasBuddy in 2021.
