= RBR Enterprises =

American professional stock car racing team

Ricky Benton Racing
- Owner: Ricky Benton
- Base: Cerro Gordo, North Carolina
- Race drivers: Cup Series: 92. David Gilliland, Timothy Peters; Gander Outdoors Truck Series: 92. Austin Theriault
- Manufacturer: Ford
- Opened: 2009
- Closed: 2019

Career
- Debut: Cup Series: 2018 Daytona 500 (Daytona); Camping World Truck Series: 2010 Nashville 200 (Nashville); ARCA Racing Series: 2009 Carolina 200 (Rockingham)
- Latest race: Cup Series: 2018 GEICO 500 (Talladega); Camping World Truck Series: 2019 TruNorth Global 250 (Martinsville); ARCA Racing Series: 2010 American 200 presented by Black's Tire and Auto Service (Rockingham)
- Races competed: Total: 86; Cup Series: 2 Camping World Truck Series: 81; ARCA Racing Series: 3
- Drivers' Championships: Total: 0 Cup Series: 0 Camping World Truck Series: 0 ARCA Racing Series: 0
- Race victories: Total: 0 Cup Series: 0 Camping World Truck Series: 0 ARCA Racing Series: 0
- Pole positions: Total: 0 Cup Series: 0 Camping World Truck Series: 0 ARCA Racing Series: 0

Ricky Benton Racing was an American professional stock car racing team that competed in the Monster Energy NASCAR Cup Series and the NASCAR Gander Outdoors Truck Series. The team was owned by Ricky Benton and last fielded the No. 92 Ford Fusion part-time in the Monster Energy NASCAR Cup Series for David Gilliland and Timothy Peters in 2018 and the No. 92 Ford F-150 part-time in the NASCAR Gander Outdoors Truck Series for Austin Theriault in 2019.

The team later essentially merged into the Truck Series operation of Front Row Motorsports in 2020 with their No. 38 Ford F-150 driven full-time by Todd Gilliland and starting in 2022, driven full-time by Zane Smith with Gilliland's move to the NASCAR Cup Series in 2022.

== Monster Energy Cup Series ==
=== Car No. 92 history ===
On January 17, 2018, RBR Enterprises announced that they would be fielding the No. 92 Carquest Auto Parts / BTS Ford Fusion in the 2018 Daytona 500 with David Gilliland.

At Talladega in April, Timothy Peters, who had recently driven for RBR in the Truck Series, made his Cup Series debut. Peters drove the Advance Auto Parts / BB&T Ford Fusion. Peters returned in the 92 at Daytona for the Coke Zero Sugar 400, however he failed to qualify.

==== Car No. 92 results ====
Monster Energy NASCAR Cup Series results
Year	Driver	No.	Make	1	2	3	4	5	6	7	8	9	10	11	12	13	14	15	16	17	18	19	20	21	22	23	24	25	26	27	28	29	30	31	32	33	34	35	36	Owners	Pts
2018	David Gilliland	92	Ford	DAY; 14	ATL	LVS	PHO	CAL	MAR	TEX	BRI	RCH																												42nd	37
2018	Timothy Peters	92	Ford										TAL; 23	DOV	KAN	CLT	POC	MCH	SON	CHI	DAY; DNQ	KEN	NHA	POC	GLN	MCH	BRI	DAR	IND	LVS	RCH	ROV	DOV	TAL	KAN	MAR	TEX	PHO	HOM	42nd	37

== Camping World Truck Series ==
=== Truck No. 92 history ===
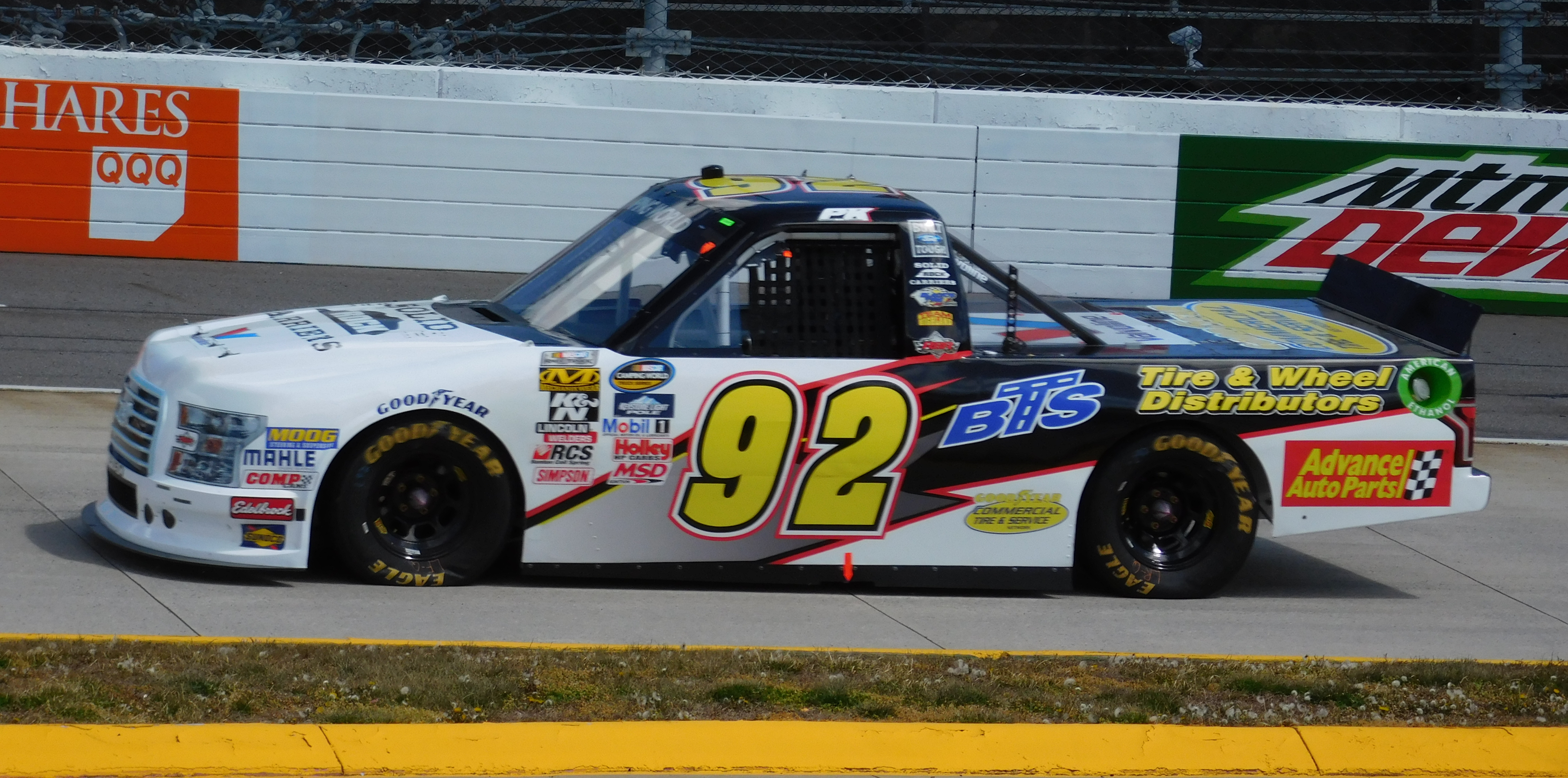
Parker Kligerman in the No. 92 at Martinsville Speedway in 2016

Beginning in 2010, the team began fielding the No. 92 Chevy Silverado for Dennis Setzer. The team's first race at Nashville yielded a 26th-place finish. Setzer would drive the truck in 9 races, with a best finish of 12th at Indianapolis Raceway Park and Bristol Motor Speedway. For the 2011 season, the team hired Clay Rogers as the driver. Rogers and RBR would finish 3rd in their debut together, and under NASCAR's new points system beginning that season, Rogers would be the points leader. The team then decide to expand their schedule from what they had previously planned. They would make it through the first 11 races of the season, before scaling back to a partial schedule. 2012 would prove to be a slow season as David Reutimann would miss the opening race at Daytona. After 3 races, Reutimann was replaced by Chad McCumbee, who would also be released after 3 starts. Scott Riggs was then hired to drive the 92 at the second Martinsville race, where he finished an impressive 5th. Riggs would return in 2013, along with Matt McCall and Clay Rogers. Riggs would get a 9th at Martinsville. For 2014, a rotation of drivers would run the truck, including Ross Chastain, Riggs, Corey Lajoie and Austin Hill, as well as a switch from Chevy to Ford. Corey Lajoie would collect the team's only top 10 of 2014. David Gilliland would take the truck over in 2015, where he would collect two top 10's. In 2016, Parker Kligerman would move to the truck. At Daytona, Kligerman and team finished 3rd, tying the team's best result. He would have 3 consecutive top 10's in the first 3 races. Once again, it looked as if the team would have a chance at attempting the full schedule. However, after the first 8 races, the team would once again be reduced to a partial schedule. Later in the season, Cole Whitt and Grant Enfinger would drive with the team. Whitt would score a 12th, while Enfinger would score a 23rd. In 2017, the team fielded the No. 92 truck part time for Regan Smith. Smith collected 2 top 10's. The team returned part-time again in 2018 with Timothy Peters for 3 races. At the first Martinsville race, they finished 7th, but would fail to qualify for Charlotte and Bristol. In 2019, they hired Austin Theriault for 8 races. They failed to qualify for Daytona by mere milliseconds, but made the field at the first Martinsville race, finishing 22nd. They attempted the North Carolina Education Lottery 200 at Charlotte, but failed to qualify. They also attempted Bristol with Peters but didn't qualify.

Benton did not field a truck in 2020 as he instead partnered with Front Row Motorsports, which included bringing RBR sponsor Black's Tire to FRM's No. 38 driven by Todd Gilliland.

=== Truck No. 92 results ===
NASCAR Gander Outdoors Truck Series results
Year	Driver	No.	Make	1	2	3	4	5	6	7	8	9	10	11	12	13	14	15	16	17	18	19	20	21	22	23	24	25	Owners	Pts
2010	Dennis Setzer	92	Chevy	DAY	ATL	MAR; DNQ	NSH; 26	KAN	DOV	CLT; 30	TEX	MCH	IOW	GTY	IRP; 12	POC	NSH	DAR; 16	BRI; 12	CHI	KEN; 15	NHA; 18	LVS	MAR; 29	TAL	TEX	PHO	HOM	37th	797
2011	Clay Rogers	92	Chevy	DAY; 3	PHO; 16	DAR; 11	MAR; 16	NSH; 31	DOV; 20	CLT; 17	KAN; 28	TEX; 25	KEN; 17	IOW; 17	NSH	IRP; 15	POC	MCH	BRI; 14	ATL	CHI	NHA	KEN; 16	LVS	TAL	MAR; 24	TEX	HOM	25th	391
2012	David Reutimann	92	Chevy	DAY; DNQ	MAR; 20	CAR; 19	KAN	CLT; 18	DOV	TEX	KEN; Wth	IOW																	35th	178
2012	Chad McCumbee	92	Chevy										CHI; 20	POC	MCH	BRI; 23	ATL; 25	IOW	KEN	LVS	TAL								35th	178
2012	Scott Riggs	92	Chevy																			MAR; 5	TEX	PHO	HOM				35th	178
2013	Scott Riggs	92	Chevy	DAY; 36	MAR; 35			CLT; 11	DOV	TEX	KEN; 23	IOW	ELD	POC	MCH				CHI; 29	LVS	TAL	MAR; 9	TEX; 22	PHO	HOM				34th	184
2013	Clay Rogers	92	Chevy			CAR; 25	KAN																						34th	184
2013	Matt McCall	92	Chevy													BRI; 22	MSP	IOW											34th	184
2014	Ross Chastain	92	Ford	DAY; 30	MAR; 14	KAN																							31st	199
2014	Scott Riggs	92	Ford				CLT; 24	DOV; 13	TEX	GTW																			31st	199
2014	Corey LaJoie	92	Ford								KEN; 17	IOW	ELD	POC	MCH	BRI; 10	MSP	CHI	NHA	LVS	TAL								31st	199
2014	Austin Hill	92	Ford																			MAR; 26	TEX	PHO	HOM; 20				31st	199
2015	David Gilliland	92	Ford	DAY; 6	ATL	MAR; 30	KAN	CLT; 27	DOV	TEX	GTW	IOW	KEN; 7	ELD	POC	MCH	BRI; 13	MSP	CHI	NHA	LVS	TAL	MAR; 23	TEX	PHO	HOM; 16			31st	187
2016	Parker Kligerman	92	Ford	DAY; 3	ATL; 8	MAR; 8	KAN; 31	DOV; 27	CLT; 18	TEX; 20	IOW; 31	GTW	KEN; 19	ELD	POC	BRI; 20	MCH	MSP	CHI	NHA	LVS; 14	TAL							28th	181
2016	Cole Whitt	92	Ford																				MAR; 12	TEX	PHO				28th	181
2016	Grant Enfinger	92	Ford																							HOM; 23			28th	181
2017	Regan Smith	92	Ford	DAY; 6	ATL; 12	MAR; 12	KAN; 12	CLT; 29	DOV; 7	TEX	GTW	IOW	KEN; 14	ELD	POC	MCH	BRI; 14	MSP	CHI; 12	NHA	LVS	TAL; 27	MAR; 14	TEX; 13	PHO	HOM; 11			26th	300
2018	Timothy Peters	92	Ford	DAY	ATL	LVS	MAR; 7	DOV	KAN	CLT; DNQ	TEX	IOW	GTW	CHI	KEN	ELD	POC	MCH	BRI; DNQ	MSP	LVS	TAL	MAR	TEX	PHO	HOM			50th	30
2019	Austin Theriault	92	Ford	DAY; DNQ	ATL	LVS	MAR; 22	TEX	DOV	KAN																			55th	15
2019	Timothy Peters	92	Ford								CLT; DNQ	TEX	IOW	GTW	CHI	KEN	POC	ELD	MCH	BRI; DNQ	MSP	LVS	TAL	MAR	PHO	HOM			55th	15

== ARCA Racing Series ==
=== Car No. 22 history ===
In 2009, the team fielded this team for only one race with Drew Herring behind the wheel, finishing 16th at Rockingham.

=== Car No. 92 history ===
This team ran just two times, one with Drew Herring, and one with Brandon McReynolds.
