= 2018 UNOH 200 =

Race details
- Race 16 of 23 of the 2018 NASCAR Camping World Truck Series
- Date: August 16, 2018
- Official name: 21st Annual UNOH 200
- Location: Bristol, Tennessee, Bristol Motor Speedway
- Course: Permanent racing facility
- Course length: 0.533 miles (0.858 km)
- Distance: 200 laps, 106.6 mi (171.556 km)
- Scheduled distance: 200 laps, 106.6 mi (171.556 km)
- Average speed: 83.119 miles per hour (133.767 km/h)

Pole position
Driver	Christopher Bell	Kyle Busch Motorsports
- Time: 15.248

Most laps led
Driver	John Hunter Nemechek	NEMCO Motorsports
- Laps: 104

Winner
No. 21	Johnny Sauter	GMS Racing

Television in the United States
- Network: FOX
- Announcers: Vince Welch, Michael Waltrip, Kevin Harvick

Radio in the United States
- Radio: Motor Racing Network

The 2018 UNOH 200 was the 16th stock car race of the 2018 NASCAR Camping World Truck Series season, the last regular season race of the year, and the 21st iteration of the event. The race was held on Thursday, August 16, 2018, at a 0.533-mile (0.858 km) permanent oval-shaped racetrack. The race took the scheduled 200 laps to complete. GMS Racing driver Johnny Sauter would pass an ailing NEMCO Motorsports driver, John Hunter Nemechek, and hold off Halmar Friesen Racing driver Stewart Friesen to win his 22nd career NASCAR Camping World Truck Series win, his fifth of the season, and would clinch the regular season championship. Friesen and Nemechek would finish second and third, respectively.

== Background ==
The layout of Bristol Motor Speedway, the venue where the race was held.

The Bristol Motor Speedway, formerly known as Bristol International Raceway and Bristol Raceway, is a NASCAR short track venue located in Bristol, Tennessee. Constructed in 1960, it held its first NASCAR race on July 30, 1961. Despite its short length, Bristol is among the most popular tracks on the NASCAR schedule because of its distinct features, which include extraordinarily steep banking, an all concrete surface, two pit roads, and stadium-like seating. It has also been named one of the loudest NASCAR tracks.

=== Entry list ===
#	Driver	Team	Make	Sponsor
0	Camden Murphy*	Jennifer Jo Cobb Racing	Chevrolet	Driven2Honor.org
2	Cody Coughlin	GMS Racing	Chevrolet	JEGS
02	Austin Hill	Young's Motorsports	Chevrolet	Randco, Young's Building Systems
3	Jordan Anderson	Jordan Anderson Racing	Chevrolet	Rusty's Off Road
4	Todd Gilliland	Kyle Busch Motorsports	Toyota	Banfield Pet Hospital
04	Cory Roper	Roper Racing	Ford	Preferred Industrial Contractors, Inc.
6	Norm Benning	Norm Benning Racing	Chevrolet	Zomongo, H&H Transport
7	Korbin Forrister	All Out Motorsports	Toyota	N. O. W. Matters More
8	John Hunter Nemechek	NEMCO Motorsports	Chevrolet	D. A. B. Constructors, Inc.
9	Codie Rohrbaugh	CR7 Motorsports	Chevrolet	Grant County Mulch
10	Jennifer Jo Cobb	Jennifer Jo Cobb Racing	Chevrolet	Driven2Honor.org
12	?*	Young's Motorsports	Chevrolet	
13	Myatt Snider	ThorSport Racing	Ford	The Carolina Nut Company
15	Stefan Parsons	Premium Motorsports	Chevrolet	Phoenix Construction
16	Brett Moffitt	Hattori Racing Enterprises	Toyota	Toyota Tsusho, Otics
18	Noah Gragson	Kyle Busch Motorsports	Toyota	Safelite Auto Glass
20	Tanner Thorson	Young's Motorsports	Chevrolet	Ohio Logistics
21	Johnny Sauter	GMS Racing	Chevrolet	GMS Fabrication
22	Austin Wayne Self	Niece Motorsports	Chevrolet	AM Technical Solutions, GO TEXAN.
24	Justin Haley	GMS Racing	Chevrolet	Fraternal Order of Eagles
25	Dalton Sargeant	GMS Racing	Chevrolet	Performance Plus Motor Oil
30	Scott Lagasse Jr.	On Point Motorsports	Toyota	On Point Motorsports
33	B. J. McLeod	Reaume Brothers Racing	Chevrolet	Steve King Foundation
38	Ross Chastain	Niece Motorsports	Chevrolet	Black Rifle Coffee Company
41	Ben Rhodes	ThorSport Racing	Ford	FEI World Equestrian Games
42	Chad Finley	Cook-Finley Racing	Chevrolet	Strutmasters, Auto Value
45	Justin Fontaine	Niece Motorsports	Chevrolet	ProMatic Automation
49	Wendell Chavous	Premium Motorsports	Chevrolet	SobrietyNation.org
50	Gray Gaulding	Beaver Motorsports	Chevrolet	VIP Racing Experience, Image Tech
51	Christopher Bell	Kyle Busch Motorsports	Toyota	Hunt Brothers Pizza
52	Stewart Friesen	Halmar Friesen Racing	Chevrolet	Halmar "We Build America"
54	Riley Herbst	DGR-Crosley	Toyota	Advance Auto Parts
63	J. J. Yeley*	MB Motorsports	Chevrolet	
68	Clay Greenfield	Clay Greenfield Motorsports	Chevrolet	AMVETS #PLEASESTAND
75	Parker Kligerman	Henderson Motorsports	Chevrolet	Food Country USA, Global Building Contractors
83	Bayley Currey	Copp Motorsports	Chevrolet	Chasco Contractors
88	Matt Crafton	ThorSport Racing	Ford	Menards, Great Lakes Flooring
92	Timothy Peters	RBR Enterprises	Ford	BTS Tire & Wheel Distributors
97	Jesse Little	JJL Motorsports	Ford	Wings Over North Georgia
98	Grant Enfinger	ThorSport Racing	Ford	Champion Power Equipment "Powering Your Life."
Official entry list

== Practice ==
=== First practice ===
The first practice session would occur on Thursday, August 16, at 9:05 AM EST, and would last for 50 minutes. Myatt Snider of ThorSport Racing would set the fastest time in the session, with a time of 15.304 and an average speed of 125.379 miles per hour (201.778 km/h).

Pos.	#	Driver	Team	Make	Time	Speed
1	13	Myatt Snider	ThorSport Racing	Ford	15.304	125.379
2	4	Todd Gilliland	Kyle Busch Motorsports	Toyota	15.307	125.354
3	51	Christopher Bell	Kyle Busch Motorsports	Toyota	15.353	124.979
Full first practice results

=== Second practice ===
The second and final practice session, sometimes referred to as Happy Hour, would occur on Thursday, August 16, at 11:05 AM EST, and would last for 50 minutes. Stewart Friesen of Halmar Friesen Racing would set the fastest time in the session, with a time of 15.263 and an average speed of 125.716 miles per hour (202.320 km/h).

Pos.	#	Driver	Team	Make	Time	Speed
1	52	Stewart Friesen	Halmar Friesen Racing	Chevrolet	15.263	125.716
2	21	Johnny Sauter	GMS Racing	Chevrolet	15.269	125.666
3	18	Noah Gragson	Kyle Busch Motorsports	Toyota	15.293	125.469
Full Happy Hour practice results

== Qualifying ==
Qualifying was held on Thursday, August 16, at 4:10 PM EST. Since Bristol Motor Speedway is under 1.5 miles (2.4 km), the qualifying system was a multi-car system that included three rounds. The first round was 15 minutes, where every driver would be able to set a lap within the 15 minutes. Then, the second round would consist of the fastest 24 cars in Round 1, and drivers would have 10 minutes to set a lap. Round 3 consisted of the fastest 12 drivers from Round 2, and the drivers would have 5 minutes to set a time. Whoever was fastest in Round 3 would win the pole.

Christopher Bell of Kyle Busch Motorsports would set the fastest time in Round 3 and win the pole with a 15.248 and an average speed of 125.839 miles per hour (202.518 km/h).

Five drivers failed to qualify: Gray Gaulding, Timothy Peters, B. J. McLeod, Norm Benning, and Jennifer Jo Cobb.

=== Full qualifying results ===
Pos.	#	Driver	Team	Make	Time (R1)	Speed (R1)	Time (R2)	Speed (R2)	Time (R3)	Speed (R3)
1	51	Christopher Bell	Kyle Busch Motorsports	Toyota	15.461	124.106	15.398	124.614	15.248	125.839
2	41	Ben Rhodes	ThorSport Racing	Ford	15.406	124.549	15.356	124.954	15.268	125.675
3	8	John Hunter Nemechek	NEMCO Motorsports	Chevrolet	15.268	125.675	15.360	124.922	15.287	125.518
4	21	Johnny Sauter	GMS Racing	Chevrolet	15.339	125.093	15.273	125.633	15.317	125.273
5	98	Grant Enfinger	ThorSport Racing	Ford	15.661	122.521	15.455	124.154	15.408	124.533
6	75	Parker Kligerman	Henderson Motorsports	Chevrolet	15.395	124.638	15.415	124.476	15.408	124.533
7	18	Noah Gragson	Kyle Busch Motorsports	Toyota	15.529	123.562	15.429	124.363	15.432	124.339
8	4	Todd Gilliland	Kyle Busch Motorsports	Toyota	15.495	123.833	15.439	124.283	15.479	123.961
9	97	Jesse Little	JJL Motorsports	Ford	15.418	124.452	15.398	124.614	15.486	123.905
10	38	Ross Chastain	Niece Motorsports	Chevrolet	15.466	124.066	15.395	124.638	15.489	123.881
11	24	Justin Haley	GMS Racing	Chevrolet	15.502	123.778	15.444	124.242	15.524	123.602
12	42	Chad Finley	Cook-Finley Racing	Chevrolet	15.685	122.333	15.459	124.122	15.583	123.134
Eliminated in Round 2
13	52	Stewart Friesen	Halmar Friesen Racing	Chevrolet	15.414	124.484	15.480	123.953	—	—
14	16	Brett Moffitt	Hattori Racing Enterprises	Toyota	15.472	124.018	15.484	123.921	—	—
15	2	Cody Coughlin	GMS Racing	Chevrolet	15.611	122.913	15.488	123.889	—	—
16	25	Dalton Sargeant	GMS Racing	Chevrolet	15.565	123.277	15.503	123.770	—	—
17	13	Myatt Snider	ThorSport Racing	Ford	15.446	124.226	15.509	123.722	—	—
18	88	Matt Crafton	ThorSport Racing	Ford	15.575	123.197	15.533	123.531	—	—
19	20	Tanner Thorson	Young's Motorsports	Chevrolet	15.539	123.483	15.556	123.348	—	—
20	54	Riley Herbst	DGR-Crosley	Toyota	15.522	123.618	15.562	123.300	—	—
21	68	Clay Greenfield	Clay Greenfield Motorsports	Chevrolet	15.724	122.030	15.588	123.095	—	—
22	30	Scott Lagasse Jr.	On Point Motorsports	Toyota	15.699	122.224	15.591	123.071	—	—
23	02	Austin Hill	Young's Motorsports	Chevrolet	15.621	122.835	15.633	122.740	—	—
24	22	Austin Wayne Self	Niece Motorsports	Chevrolet	15.599	123.008	15.762	121.736	—	—
Eliminated in Round 1
25	9	Codie Rohrbaugh	CR7 Motorsports	Chevrolet	15.733	121.960	—	—	—	—
26	04	Cory Roper	Roper Racing	Ford	15.742	121.890	—	—	—	—
27	7	Korbin Forrister	All Out Motorsports	Toyota	15.808	121.382	—	—	—	—
Qualified by owner's points
28	83	Bayley Currey	Copp Motorsports	Chevrolet	15.854	121.029	—	—	—	—
29	3	Jordan Anderson	Jordan Anderson Racing	Chevrolet	15.881	120.824	—	—	—	—
30	15	Stefan Parsons	Premium Motorsports	Chevrolet	16.024	119.745	—	—	—	—
31	45	Justin Fontaine	Niece Motorsports	Chevrolet	16.028	119.715	—	—	—	—
32	49	Wendell Chavous	Premium Motorsports	Chevrolet	16.476	116.460	—	—	—	—
Failed to qualify or withdrew
33	50	Gray Gaulding	Beaver Motorsports	Chevrolet	15.827	121.236	—	—	—	—
34	92	Timothy Peters	RBR Enterprises	Ford	15.827	121.236	—	—	—	—
35	33	B. J. McLeod	Reaume Brothers Racing	Chevrolet	15.849	121.068	—	—	—	—
36	6	Norm Benning	Norm Benning Racing	Chevrolet	17.246	111.261	—	—	—	—
37	10	Jennifer Jo Cobb	Jennifer Jo Cobb Racing	Chevrolet	17.639	108.782	—	—	—	—
WD	0	Camden Murphy	Jennifer Jo Cobb Racing	Chevrolet	—	—	—	—	—	—
WD	12	?	Young's Motorsports	Chevrolet	—	—	—	—	—	—
WD	63	J. J. Yeley	MB Motorsports	Chevrolet	—	—	—	—	—	—
Official qualifying results
Official starting lineup

== Race results ==
Stage 1 Laps: 55

Pos.	#	Driver	Team	Make	Pts
1	8	John Hunter Nemechek	NEMCO Motorsports	Chevrolet	0
2	21	Johnny Sauter	GMS Racing	Chevrolet	9
3	98	Grant Enfinger	ThorSport Racing	Ford	8
4	51	Christopher Bell	Kyle Busch Motorsports	Toyota	0
5	41	Ben Rhodes	ThorSport Racing	Ford	6
6	75	Parker Kligerman	Henderson Motorsports	Chevrolet	5
7	52	Stewart Friesen	Halmar Friesen Racing	Chevrolet	4
8	38	Ross Chastain	Niece Motorsports	Chevrolet	0
9	18	Noah Gragson	Kyle Busch Motorsports	Toyota	2
10	24	Justin Haley	GMS Racing	Chevrolet	1

Stage 2 Laps: 55

Pos.	#	Driver	Team	Make	Pts
1	8	John Hunter Nemechek	NEMCO Motorsports	Chevrolet	0
2	21	Johnny Sauter	GMS Racing	Chevrolet	9
3	16	Brett Moffitt	Hattori Racing Enterprises	Toyota	8
4	52	Stewart Friesen	Halmar Friesen Racing	Chevrolet	7
5	51	Christopher Bell	Kyle Busch Motorsports	Toyota	0
6	75	Parker Kligerman	Henderson Motorsports	Chevrolet	5
7	41	Ben Rhodes	ThorSport Racing	Ford	4
8	24	Justin Haley	GMS Racing	Chevrolet	3
9	98	Grant Enfinger	ThorSport Racing	Ford	2
10	25	Dalton Sargeant	GMS Racing	Chevrolet	1

Stage 3 Laps: 90

Fin	St	#	Driver	Team	Make	Laps	Led	Status	Pts
1	4	21	Johnny Sauter	GMS Racing	Chevrolet	200	58	running	58
2	13	52	Stewart Friesen	Halmar Friesen Racing	Chevrolet	200	0	running	46
3	3	8	John Hunter Nemechek	NEMCO Motorsports	Chevrolet	200	104	running	0
4	6	75	Parker Kligerman	Henderson Motorsports	Chevrolet	200	0	running	43
5	8	4	Todd Gilliland	Kyle Busch Motorsports	Toyota	200	0	running	32
6	11	24	Justin Haley	GMS Racing	Chevrolet	200	0	running	35
7	2	41	Ben Rhodes	ThorSport Racing	Ford	200	0	running	40
8	18	88	Matt Crafton	ThorSport Racing	Ford	200	0	running	29
9	7	18	Noah Gragson	Kyle Busch Motorsports	Toyota	200	7	running	30
10	5	98	Grant Enfinger	ThorSport Racing	Ford	200	0	running	37
11	16	25	Dalton Sargeant	GMS Racing	Chevrolet	200	0	running	27
12	10	38	Ross Chastain	Niece Motorsports	Chevrolet	199	0	running	0
13	24	22	Austin Wayne Self	Niece Motorsports	Chevrolet	199	0	running	24
14	19	20	Tanner Thorson	Young's Motorsports	Chevrolet	198	0	running	23
15	20	54	Riley Herbst	DGR-Crosley	Toyota	198	0	running	22
16	25	9	Codie Rohrbaugh	CR7 Motorsports	Chevrolet	198	0	running	21
17	30	15	Stefan Parsons	Premium Motorsports	Chevrolet	198	0	running	20
18	14	16	Brett Moffitt	Hattori Racing Enterprises	Toyota	198	0	running	27
19	15	2	Cody Coughlin	GMS Racing	Chevrolet	198	0	running	18
20	21	68	Clay Greenfield	Clay Greenfield Motorsports	Chevrolet	197	0	running	17
21	23	02	Austin Hill	Young's Motorsports	Chevrolet	197	0	running	16
22	29	3	Jordan Anderson	Jordan Anderson Racing	Chevrolet	197	0	running	15
23	32	49	Wendell Chavous	Premium Motorsports	Chevrolet	196	0	running	14
24	31	45	Justin Fontaine	Niece Motorsports	Chevrolet	196	0	running	13
25	26	04	Cory Roper	Roper Racing	Ford	195	0	running	12
26	9	97	Jesse Little	JJL Motorsports	Ford	194	0	running	11
27	27	7	Korbin Forrister	All Out Motorsports	Toyota	188	0	running	10
28	1	51	Christopher Bell	Kyle Busch Motorsports	Toyota	184	31	running	0
29	17	13	Myatt Snider	ThorSport Racing	Ford	161	0	power steering	8
30	12	42	Chad Finley	Cook-Finley Racing	Chevrolet	61	0	engine	7
31	22	30	Scott Lagasse Jr.	On Point Motorsports	Toyota	24	0	crash	0
32	28	83	Bayley Currey	Copp Motorsports	Chevrolet	13	0	crash	5
Failed to qualify or withdrew
33		50	Gray Gaulding	Beaver Motorsports	Chevrolet				
34		92	Timothy Peters	RBR Enterprises	Ford				
35		33	B. J. McLeod	Reaume Brothers Racing	Chevrolet				
36		6	Norm Benning	Norm Benning Racing	Chevrolet				
37		10	Jennifer Jo Cobb	Jennifer Jo Cobb Racing	Chevrolet				
WD		0	Camden Murphy	Jennifer Jo Cobb Racing	Chevrolet				
WD		12	?	Young's Motorsports	Chevrolet				
WD		63	J. J. Yeley	MB Motorsports	Chevrolet				
Official race results

Previous race: 2018 Corrigan Oil 200	NASCAR Camping World Truck Series; 2018 season	Next race: 2018 Chevrolet Silverado 250
