= 2018 Texas Roadhouse 200 =

20th race of the 2018 NASCAR Camping World Truck Series

Race details
- Race 20 of 23 of the 2018 NASCAR Camping World Truck Series
- Date: October 27, 2018
- Official name: 16th Annual Texas Roadhouse 200
- Location: Martinsville, Virginia, Martinsville Speedway
- Course: Permanent racing facility
- Course length: 0.526 miles (0.847 km)
- Distance: 200 laps, 105.2 mi (169.302 km)
- Scheduled distance: 200 laps, 105.2 mi (169.302 km)
- Average speed: 69.299 miles per hour (111.526 km/h)

Pole position
Driver	Todd Gilliland	Kyle Busch Motorsports
- Time: 19.909

Most laps led
Driver	Johnny Sauter	GMS Racing
- Laps: 148

Winner
No. 21	Johnny Sauter	GMS Racing

Television in the United States
- Network: Fox Sports 1
- Announcers: Vince Welch, Phil Parsons, Kurt Busch

Radio in the United States
- Radio: Motor Racing Network

The 2018 Texas Roadhouse 200 was the 20th stock car race of the 2018 NASCAR Camping World Truck Series, the first race of the Round of 6, and the 16th iteration of the event. The race was held on Saturday, October 27, 2018, in Martinsville, Virginia at Martinsville Speedway, a 0.526 miles (0.847 km) permanent oval-shaped short track. The race took the scheduled 200 laps to complete. At race's end, Johnny Sauter of GMS Racing would dominate the race to win his 23rd career NASCAR Camping World Truck Series win and his sixth and final of the season to lock himself into the Championship 4. To fill out the podium, Brett Moffitt of Hattori Racing Enterprises and Myatt Snider of ThorSport Racing would finish second and third, respectively.

== Background ==
The layout of Martinsville Speedway, the venue where the race was held.

Martinsville Speedway is a NASCAR-owned stock car racing track located in Henry County, in Ridgeway, Virginia, just to the south of Martinsville. At 0.526 miles (0.847 km) in length, it is the shortest track in the NASCAR Cup Series. The track was also one of the first paved oval tracks in NASCAR, being built in 1947 by H. Clay Earles. It is also the only remaining race track that has been on the NASCAR circuit from its beginning in 1948.

=== Entry list ===
#	Driver	Team	Make	Sponsor
0	Ray Ciccarelli	Jennifer Jo Cobb Racing	Chevrolet	Ciccarelli Moving & Installations
2	Sheldon Creed	GMS Racing	Chevrolet	A. M. Ortega
02	Austin Hill	Young's Motorsports	Chevrolet	Randco, Young's Building Systems
3	Jordan Anderson	Jordan Anderson Racing	Chevrolet	Commercial Property Services, Knight Fire Protection
4	Todd Gilliland	Kyle Busch Motorsports	Toyota	SiriusXM, JBL
6	Norm Benning	Norm Benning Racing	Chevrolet	H&H Transport
8	John Hunter Nemechek	NEMCO Motorsports	Chevrolet	Ollie's Bargain Outlet
10	Jennifer Jo Cobb	Jennifer Jo Cobb Racing	Chevrolet	Driven2Honor.org
13	Myatt Snider	ThorSport Racing	Ford	Louisiana Hot Sauce
15	Brad Foy	Premium Motorsports	Chevrolet	Strutmasters
16	Brett Moffitt	Hattori Racing Enterprises	Toyota	Aisin
17	Kyle Benjamin	DGR-Crosley	Toyota	Crosley Brands
18	Noah Gragson	Kyle Busch Motorsports	Toyota	Safelite Auto Glass
20	Tanner Thorson	Young's Motorsports	Chevrolet	GoShare
21	Johnny Sauter	GMS Racing	Chevrolet	ISM Connect
22	Austin Wayne Self	Niece Motorsports	Chevrolet	AM Technical Solutions, GO TEXAN.
23	Timothy Peters	GMS Racing	Chevrolet	AutosByNelson.com
24	Justin Haley	GMS Racing	Chevrolet	Fraternal Order of Eagles
25	Tyler Dippel	GMS Racing	Chevrolet	America First Action Super PAC, Turning Point USA
30	Jeb Burton	On Point Motorsports	Toyota	Strutmasters, Sparrow Ranch
33	Chad Finley	Reaume Brothers Racing	Chevrolet	Strutmasters, Auto Value
38	Landon Huffman	Niece Motorsports	Chevrolet	Plan B Sales
41	Ben Rhodes	ThorSport Racing	Ford	The Carolina Nut Company
45	Justin Fontaine	Niece Motorsports	Chevrolet	ProMatic Automation
46	Christian Eckes	Kyle Busch Motorsports	Toyota	Craftsman
49	D. J. Kennington	Premium Motorsports	Chevrolet	SobrietyNation.org
51	Harrison Burton	Kyle Busch Motorsports	Toyota	Morton Buildings
52	Stewart Friesen	Halmar Friesen Racing	Chevrolet	Halmar "We Build America"
54	Tyler Ankrum	DGR-Crosley	Toyota	May's Hawaii
63	Kyle Donahue	MB Motorsports	Chevrolet	First Responder Racing
75	Parker Kligerman	Henderson Motorsports	Chevrolet	Food Country USA, Global Building Contractors
83	Dawson Cram	Copp Motorsports	Chevrolet	RGS Products
88	Matt Crafton	ThorSport Racing	Ford	Menards, Chi-Chi's
98	Grant Enfinger	ThorSport Racing	Ford	Protect the Harvest
99	Chase Purdy	MDM Motorsports	Chevrolet	Bama Buggies
Official entry list

== Practice ==
Originally, there were going to be two scheduled 50-minute practice sessions on Friday, October 26. However, rain would cancel both sessions.

== Qualifying ==
Qualifying was held on Saturday, October 27, at 10:05 AM EST. Since Martinsville Speedway under 1.5 miles (2.4 km), the qualifying system was a multi-car system that included three rounds. The first round was 15 minutes, where every driver would be able to set a lap within the 15 minutes. Then, the second round would consist of the fastest 24 cars in Round 1, and drivers would have 10 minutes to set a lap. Round 3 consisted of the fastest 12 drivers from Round 2, and the drivers would have 5 minutes to set a time. Whoever was fastest in Round 3 would win the pole.

Todd Gilliland of Kyle Busch Motorsports would set the fastest time in Round 3 and win the pole with a 19.909 and an average speed of 95.113 miles per hour (153.070 km/h).

Three drivers would fail to qualify: Norm Benning, Ray Ciccarelli, and Landon Huffman.

=== Full qualifying results ===
Pos.	#	Driver	Team	Make	Time (R1)	Speed (R1)	Time (R2)	Speed (R2)	Time (R3)	Speed (R3)
1	4	Todd Gilliland	Kyle Busch Motorsports	Toyota	20.210	93.696	19.976	94.794	19.909	95.113
2	51	Harrison Burton	Kyle Busch Motorsports	Toyota	20.189	93.794	20.079	94.307	20.005	94.656
3	18	Noah Gragson	Kyle Busch Motorsports	Toyota	20.239	93.562	20.078	94.312	20.013	94.618
4	41	Ben Rhodes	ThorSport Racing	Ford	20.256	93.483	20.016	94.604	20.019	94.590
5	17	Kyle Benjamin	DGR-Crosley	Toyota	20.299	93.285	19.998	94.689	20.048	94.453
6	98	Grant Enfinger	ThorSport Racing	Ford	20.093	94.242	19.988	94.737	20.053	94.430
7	02	Austin Hill	Young's Motorsports	Chevrolet	20.118	94.125	20.122	94.106	20.063	94.383
8	21	Johnny Sauter	GMS Racing	Chevrolet	20.176	93.854	19.989	94.732	20.075	94.326
9	23	Timothy Peters	GMS Racing	Chevrolet	20.178	93.845	20.076	94.322	20.114	94.143
10	88	Matt Crafton	ThorSport Racing	Ford	20.216	93.668	20.140	94.022	20.132	94.059
11	52	Stewart Friesen	Halmar Friesen Racing	Chevrolet	20.112	94.153	20.098	94.218	20.208	93.705
12	46	Christian Eckes	Kyle Busch Motorsports	Toyota	20.349	93.056	20.132	94.059	20.409	92.783
Eliminated in Round 2
13	24	Justin Haley	GMS Racing	Chevrolet	20.273	93.405	20.154	93.957	—	—
14	75	Parker Kligerman	Henderson Motorsports	Chevrolet	20.312	93.226	20.157	93.943	—	—
15	2	Sheldon Creed	GMS Racing	Chevrolet	20.332	93.134	20.168	93.891	—	—
16	13	Myatt Snider	ThorSport Racing	Ford	20.271	93.414	20.179	93.840	—	—
17	16	Brett Moffitt	Hattori Racing Enterprises	Toyota	20.128	94.078	20.207	93.710	—	—
18	8	John Hunter Nemechek	NEMCO Motorsports	Chevrolet	20.343	93.084	20.220	93.650	—	—
19	54	Tyler Ankrum	DGR-Crosley	Toyota	20.267	93.433	20.317	93.203	—	—
20	33	Chad Finley	Reaume Brothers Racing	Chevrolet	20.340	93.097	20.381	92.910	—	—
21	63	Kyle Donahue	MB Motorsports	Chevrolet	20.366	92.978	20.397	92.837	—	—
22	30	Jeb Burton	On Point Motorsports	Toyota	20.473	92.493	20.500	92.371	—	—
23	83	Dawson Cram	Copp Motorsports	Chevrolet	20.304	93.262	20.579	92.016	—	—
24	49	D. J. Kennington	Premium Motorsports	Chevrolet	20.497	92.384	—	—	—	—
Eliminated in Round 1
25	25	Tyler Dippel	GMS Racing	Chevrolet	20.506	92.344	—	—	—	—
26	3	Jordan Anderson	Jordan Anderson Racing	Chevrolet	20.544	92.173	—	—	—	—
27	99	Chase Purdy	MDM Motorsports	Chevrolet	20.579	92.016	—	—	—	—
Qualified by owner's points
28	45	Justin Fontaine	Niece Motorsports	Chevrolet	20.712	91.425	—	—	—	—
29	22	Austin Wayne Self	Niece Motorsports	Chevrolet	20.723	91.377	—	—	—	—
30	20	Tanner Thorson	Young's Motorsports	Chevrolet	20.924	90.499	—	—	—	—
31	15	Brad Foy	Premium Motorsports	Chevrolet	21.083	89.816	—	—	—	—
32	10	Jennifer Jo Cobb	Jennifer Jo Cobb Racing	Chevrolet	22.594	83.810	—	—	—	—
Failed to qualify
33	6	Norm Benning	Norm Benning Racing	Chevrolet	20.771	91.166	—	—	—	—
34	0	Ray Ciccarelli	Jennifer Jo Cobb Racing	Chevrolet	20.895	90.625	—	—	—	—
35	38	Landon Huffman	Niece Motorsports	Chevrolet	—	—	—	—	—	—
Official qualifying results
Official starting lineup

== Race results ==
Stage 1 Laps: 50

Pos.	#	Driver	Team	Make	Pts
1	21	Johnny Sauter	GMS Racing	Chevrolet	10
2	18	Noah Gragson	Kyle Busch Motorsports	Toyota	9
3	88	Matt Crafton	ThorSport Racing	Ford	8
4	41	Ben Rhodes	ThorSport Racing	Ford	7
5	17	Kyle Benjamin	DGR-Crosley	Toyota	0
6	98	Grant Enfinger	ThorSport Racing	Ford	5
7	54	Tyler Ankrum	DGR-Crosley	Toyota	4
8	23	Timothy Peters	GMS Racing	Chevrolet	3
9	51	Harrison Burton	Kyle Busch Motorsports	Toyota	2
10	24	Justin Haley	GMS Racing	Chevrolet	1

Stage 2 Laps: 50

Pos.	#	Driver	Team	Make	Pts
1	21	Johnny Sauter	GMS Racing	Chevrolet	10
2	18	Noah Gragson	Kyle Busch Motorsports	Toyota	9
3	8	John Hunter Nemechek	NEMCO Motorsports	Chevrolet	0
4	4	Todd Gilliland	Kyle Busch Motorsports	Toyota	7
5	88	Matt Crafton	ThorSport Racing	Ford	6
6	98	Grant Enfinger	ThorSport Racing	Ford	5
7	23	Timothy Peters	GMS Racing	Chevrolet	4
8	24	Justin Haley	GMS Racing	Chevrolet	3
9	16	Brett Moffitt	Hattori Racing Enterprises	Toyota	2
10	51	Harrison Burton	Kyle Busch Motorsports	Toyota	1

Stage 3 Laps: 100

Fin	St	#	Driver	Team	Make	Laps	Led	Status	Pts
1	8	21	Johnny Sauter	GMS Racing	Chevrolet	200	148	running	60
2	17	16	Brett Moffitt	Hattori Racing Enterprises	Toyota	200	0	running	37
3	16	13	Myatt Snider	ThorSport Racing	Ford	200	7	running	34
4	4	41	Ben Rhodes	ThorSport Racing	Ford	200	0	running	40
5	5	17	Kyle Benjamin	DGR-Crosley	Toyota	200	6	running	0
6	13	24	Justin Haley	GMS Racing	Chevrolet	200	0	running	35
7	3	18	Noah Gragson	Kyle Busch Motorsports	Toyota	200	0	running	48
8	2	51	Harrison Burton	Kyle Busch Motorsports	Toyota	200	0	running	32
9	12	46	Christian Eckes	Kyle Busch Motorsports	Toyota	200	0	running	28
10	9	23	Timothy Peters	GMS Racing	Chevrolet	200	0	running	34
11	11	52	Stewart Friesen	Halmar Friesen Racing	Chevrolet	200	0	running	26
12	1	4	Todd Gilliland	Kyle Busch Motorsports	Toyota	200	39	running	32
13	10	88	Matt Crafton	ThorSport Racing	Ford	200	0	running	38
14	6	98	Grant Enfinger	ThorSport Racing	Ford	200	0	running	33
15	22	30	Jeb Burton	On Point Motorsports	Toyota	200	0	running	0
16	14	75	Parker Kligerman	Henderson Motorsports	Chevrolet	200	0	running	21
17	25	25	Tyler Dippel	GMS Racing	Chevrolet	200	0	running	20
18	19	54	Tyler Ankrum	DGR-Crosley	Toyota	200	0	running	23
19	15	2	Sheldon Creed	GMS Racing	Chevrolet	200	0	running	18
20	7	02	Austin Hill	Young's Motorsports	Chevrolet	200	0	running	17
21	27	99	Chase Purdy	MDM Motorsports	Chevrolet	200	0	running	16
22	21	63	Kyle Donahue	MB Motorsports	Chevrolet	200	0	running	15
23	29	22	Austin Wayne Self	Niece Motorsports	Chevrolet	200	0	running	14
24	23	83	Dawson Cram	Copp Motorsports	Chevrolet	199	0	running	13
25	24	49	D. J. Kennington	Premium Motorsports	Chevrolet	199	0	running	12
26	26	3	Jordan Anderson	Jordan Anderson Racing	Chevrolet	199	0	running	11
27	28	45	Justin Fontaine	Niece Motorsports	Chevrolet	197	0	running	10
28	31	15	Brad Foy	Premium Motorsports	Chevrolet	194	0	running	9
29	32	10	Jennifer Jo Cobb	Jennifer Jo Cobb Racing	Chevrolet	189	0	running	8
30	18	8	John Hunter Nemechek	NEMCO Motorsports	Chevrolet	177	0	rear gear	0
31	30	20	Tanner Thorson	Young's Motorsports	Chevrolet	137	0	brakes	6
32	20	33	Chad Finley	Reaume Brothers Racing	Chevrolet	35	0	crash	5
Failed to qualify
33		6	Norm Benning	Norm Benning Racing	Chevrolet				
34		0	Ray Ciccarelli	Jennifer Jo Cobb Racing	Chevrolet				
35		38	Landon Huffman	Niece Motorsports	Chevrolet				
Official race results

Previous race: 2018 Fr8Auctions 250	NASCAR Camping World Truck Series; 2018 season	Next race: 2018 JAG Metals 350
