= Jordan Anderson (racing driver) =

American racing driver (born 1991)

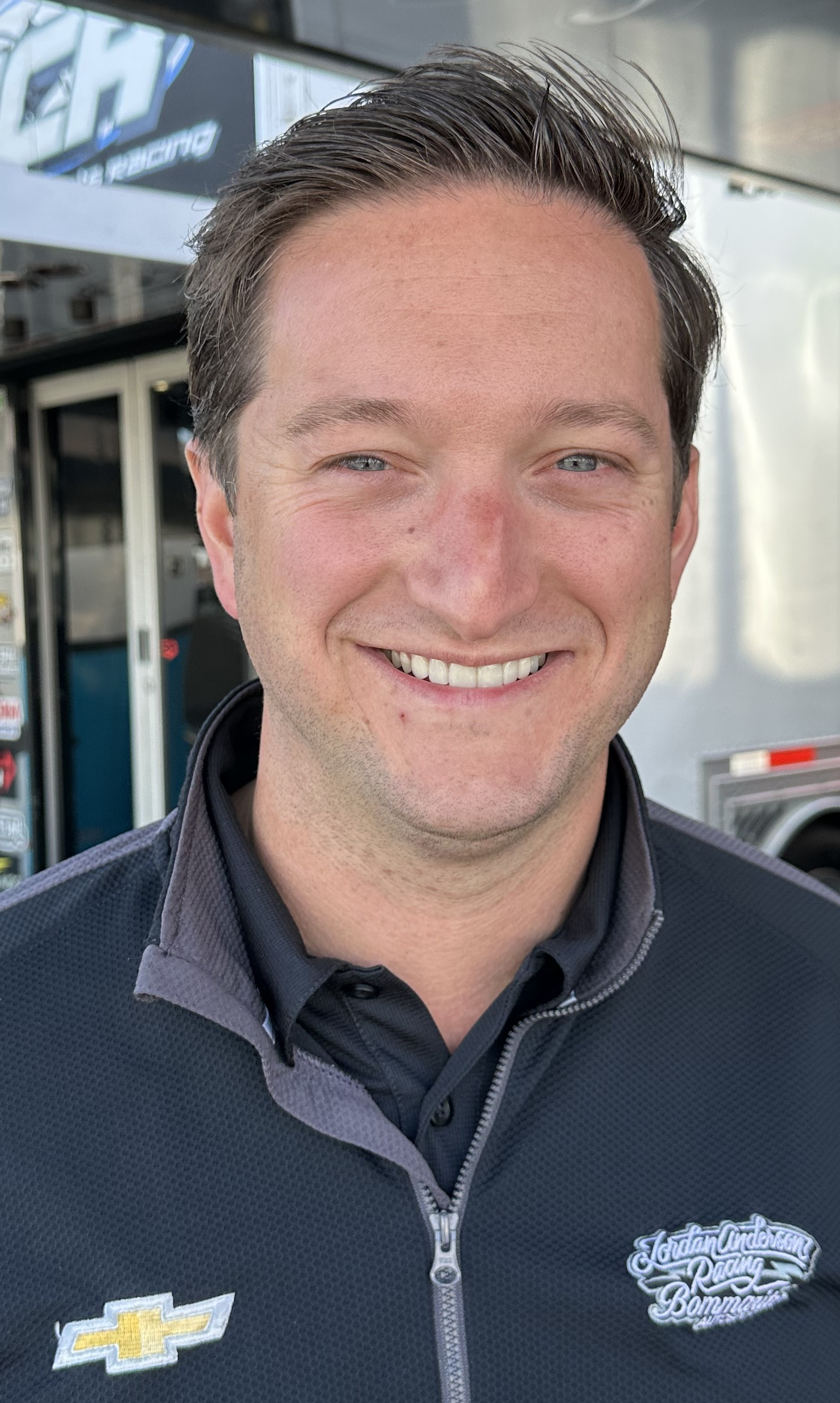
- Anderson at Las Vegas Motor Speedway in 2024
- Born: Jordan Lee Anderson; April 15, 1991 (age 35); Forest Acres, South Carolina, U.S.
- Height: 6 ft 2 in (1.88 m)
- Weight: 175 lb (79 kg)

NASCAR O'Reilly Auto Parts Series career
- 31 races run over 8 years
- 2026 position: 45th
- Best finish: 41st (2024)
- First race: 2015 Food City 300 (Bristol)
- Last race: 2026 Nu Way 225 (Gateway)
Wins	Top tens	Poles
0	5	0

NASCAR FedEx Freight Truck Series career
- 139 races run over 10 years
- 2025 position: 104th
- Best finish: 15th (2018)
- First race: 2014 Lucas Oil 150 (Phoenix)
- Last race: 2025 TSport 200 (IRP)
Wins	Top tens	Poles
0	6	0

ARCA Menards Series East career
- 2 races run over 2 years
- Best finish: 70th (2014)
- First race: 2013 Kevin Whitaker Chevrolet 150 (Greenville-Pickens)
- Last race: 2014 Blue Ox 100 (Richmond)
Wins	Top tens	Poles
0	0	0
- Statistics up to date as of November 7, 2026.

Jordan Lee Anderson (born April 15, 1991) is an American professional stock car racing driver and team owner. He last competed part-time in the NASCAR O'Reilly Auto Parts Series, driving the No. 32 Chevrolet Camaro SS for his own team, Jordan Anderson Racing.

== Racing career ==
=== Early career ===
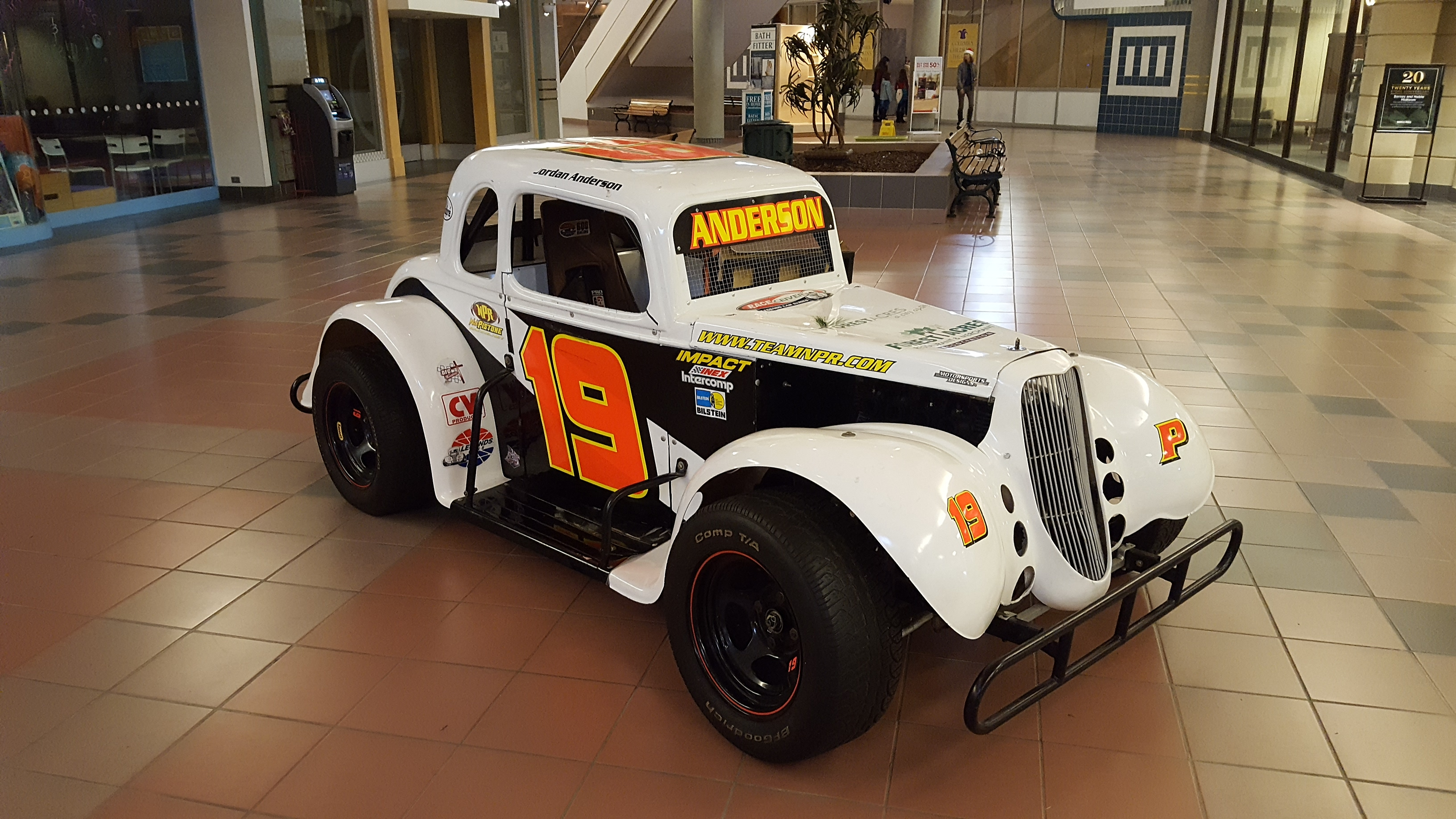
One of Anderson's legends cars on display at the Richland Mall in his hometown of Forest Acres, South Carolina, in December 2017

Anderson began racing in karts as an eight-year-old. He raced in Legends and Late model cars as his career developed. Anderson made one start in the NASCAR K&N Pro Series East in 2013 along with two starts in the CARS X-1R Pro Cup Series and various Late Model races. He made an April 2014 start in the K&N Pro Series East at Richmond with the intention of running the full season, but his car owner began writing bad checks, and the team was forced to close down. Anderson then sold one of his own personally-owned Super Late Models to pay off the debt of his former car owner and keep his name clear of any debts.

Anderson made his debut in the NASCAR Camping World Truck Series in the second-to-last race of the 2014 season at Phoenix in the No. 50 truck for MAKE Motorsports. The following week, he competed for Mike Harmon Racing in their No. 74 truck in the final race of 2014 season at Homestead-Miami. In 2015, Anderson returned to MHR, using his savings account to buy a truck to drive and qualify for the Daytona race, but failed to qualify. It would be his rookie season in the Truck Series. Anderson would continue driving for Harmon throughout the entire 2015 season, running nearly the full season and finishing nineteenth in final driver points with a best finish of thirteenth at Michigan. Also during 2015, Anderson made his Xfinity Series debut for Harmon in the Bristol night race.

=== 2016–2017 ===
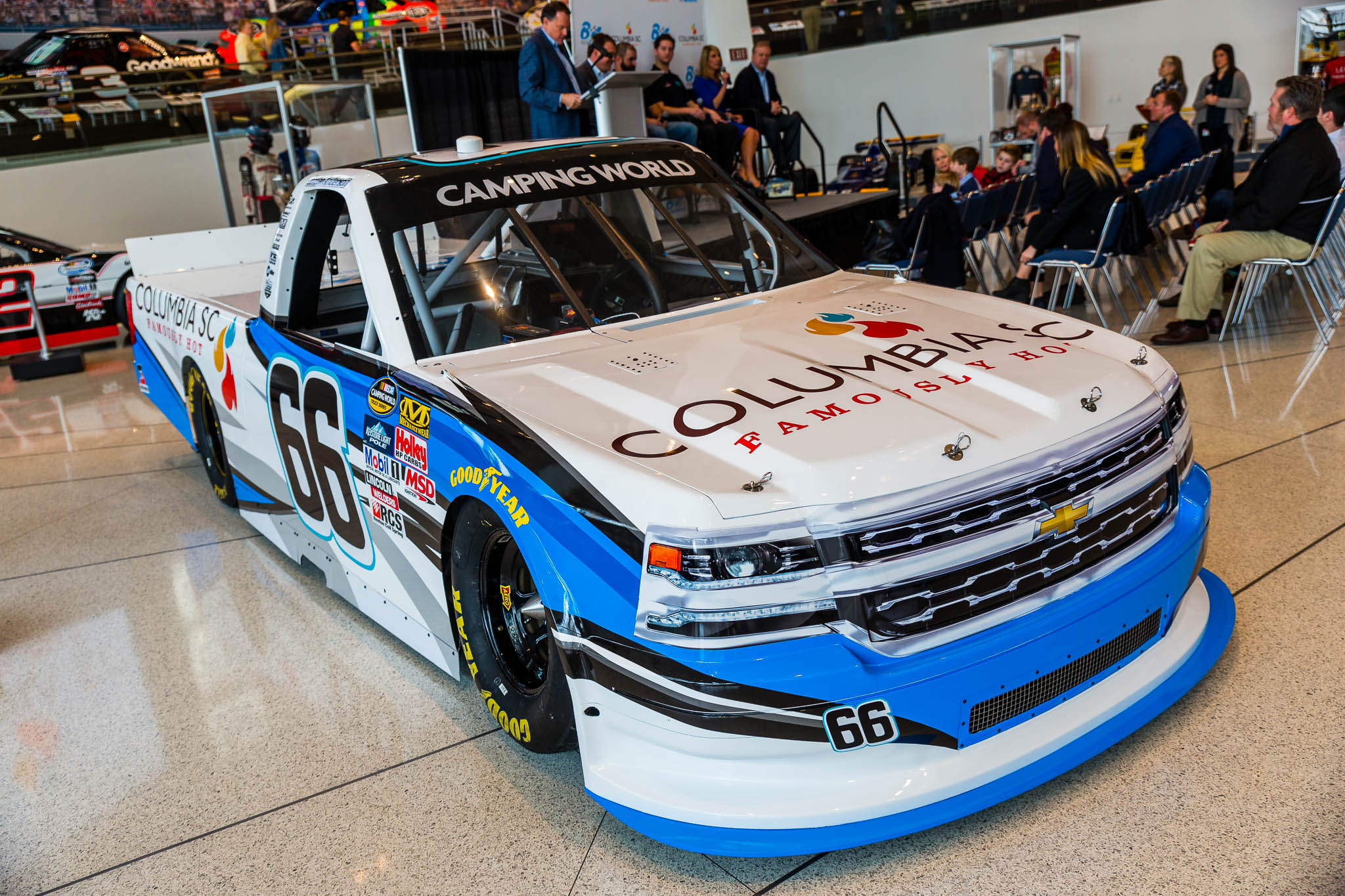
Anderson's 2016 No. 66 truck at the NASCAR Hall of Fame

In 2016, Anderson joined Bolen Motorsports for the full Truck schedule, driving the No. 66 Silverado with sponsorship from Columbia, SC – Famously Hot. After securing the last qualifying spot to race at Daytona in February, the team went on to log eight top-twenty finishes throughout the season. Anderson's truck garnered national attention in September as it was funded thanks in part to a "Fueled by Fans" campaign with over 120 fans sponsoring the truck to pay for a new motor for the team. Anderson would go on to finish in the top-twenty in the championship standings by only a mere point in the series for a second straight year. He also ran five Xfinity races in 2016, four for Obaika Racing and one for Precision Performance Motorsports.

Anderson started off 2017 by failing to qualify at Daytona with Mike Harmon Racing. After his No. 12 truck (which borrowed owner points from Rick Ware Racing) crashed at Atlanta, Anderson was left with no truck to drive for the season and made a website – SponsorJordan.com – for the fans to fund him a truck. While raising funds, Anderson started and parked RSS Racing's second car. Due to the large time gaps between races, Anderson was back two races later at Kansas Speedway. He also ran one race in the NASCAR Xfinity Series for B. J. McLeod Motorsports, at Dover International Speedway. Starting at Kansas, Anderson teamed up with TJL Motorsports to use TJL's owner points while bringing his own equipment to the track. He missed two races due to TJL having other drivers signed to drive, but otherwise ran the rest of the season and would go on to finish in the top 20 in the CWTS driver points for a third straight season. Besides his spring SponsorJordan.com initiative, Anderson received additional help throughout the season from former NASCAR driver Kenny Wallace after Gateway and ran another fan-funded campaign to close out the season.

=== 2018–2020: Truck Series owner-driver ===
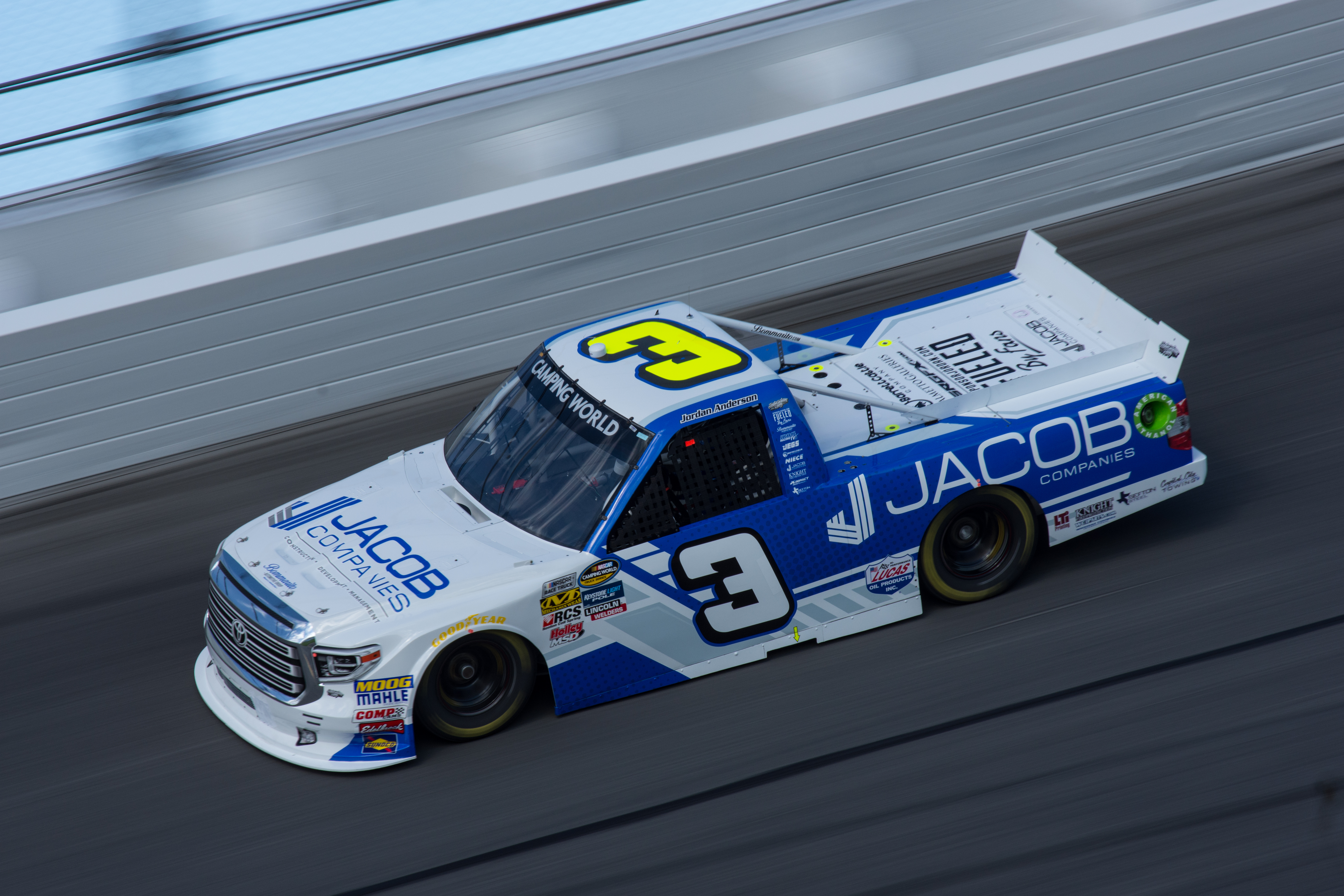
Anderson in his Jordan Anderson Racing No. 3 truck at Daytona in 2018, the team's first race

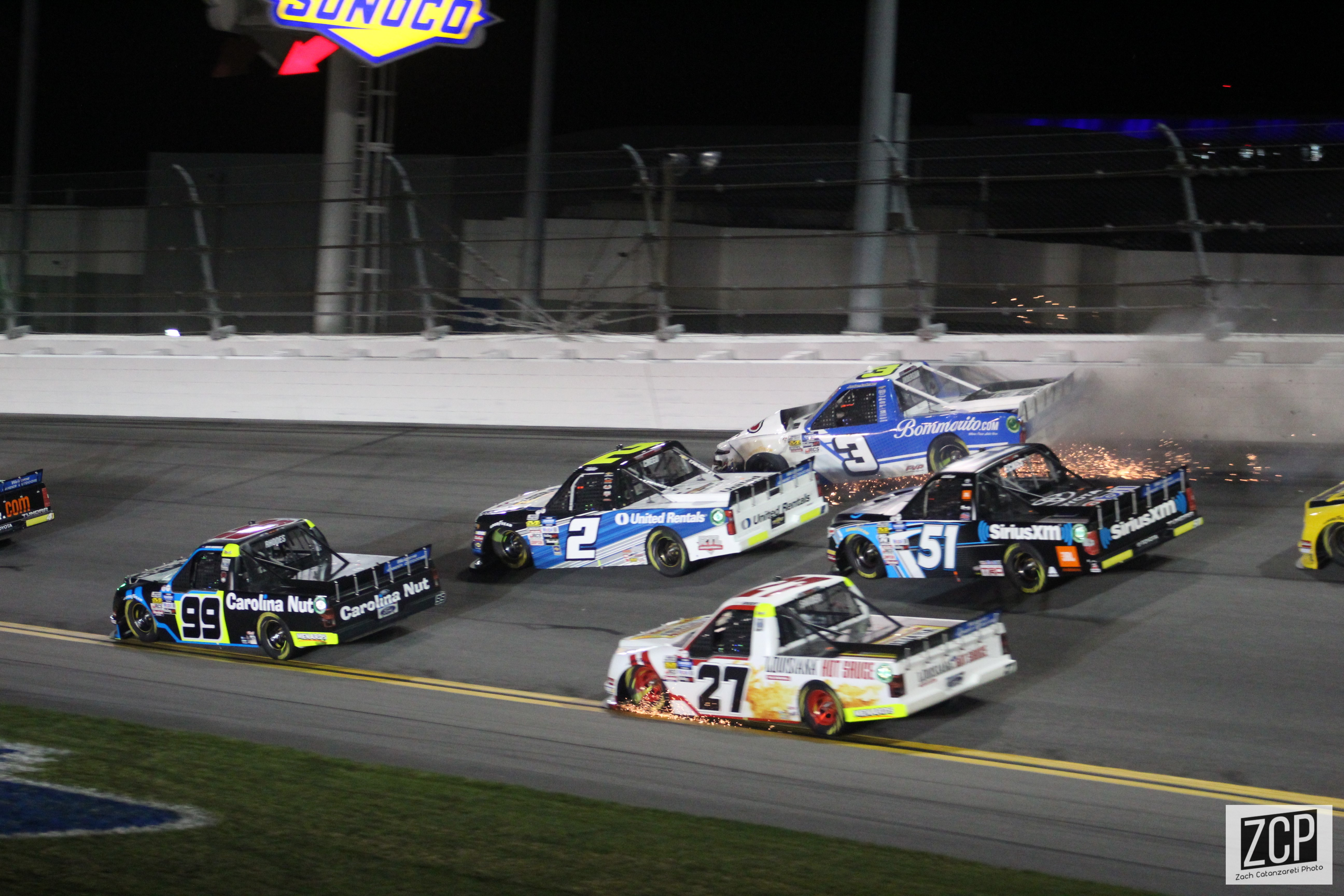
Anderson (No. 3) crashing out in the 2019 Truck Series season-opener at Daytona

On January 31, 2018, Anderson announced he would be forming his own team, Jordan Anderson Racing, and would run full-time in the Truck Series in 2018 using the No. 3. which he chose in connection with Junior Johnson. JAR acquired trucks from Niece Motorsports, who switched from Toyota to Chevrolet before 2018 and Brad Keselowski Racing, who ceased operations at the end of 2017. As for the first half of the 2018 season, Anderson has an average finish of 19.7 and was two top-twenty finishes away from tying his record of eight top-twenty finishes from the 2016 season. In early July at the Charlotte Motor Speedway during Roval testing it was announced that Ryan Newman would race for the team at Eldora.

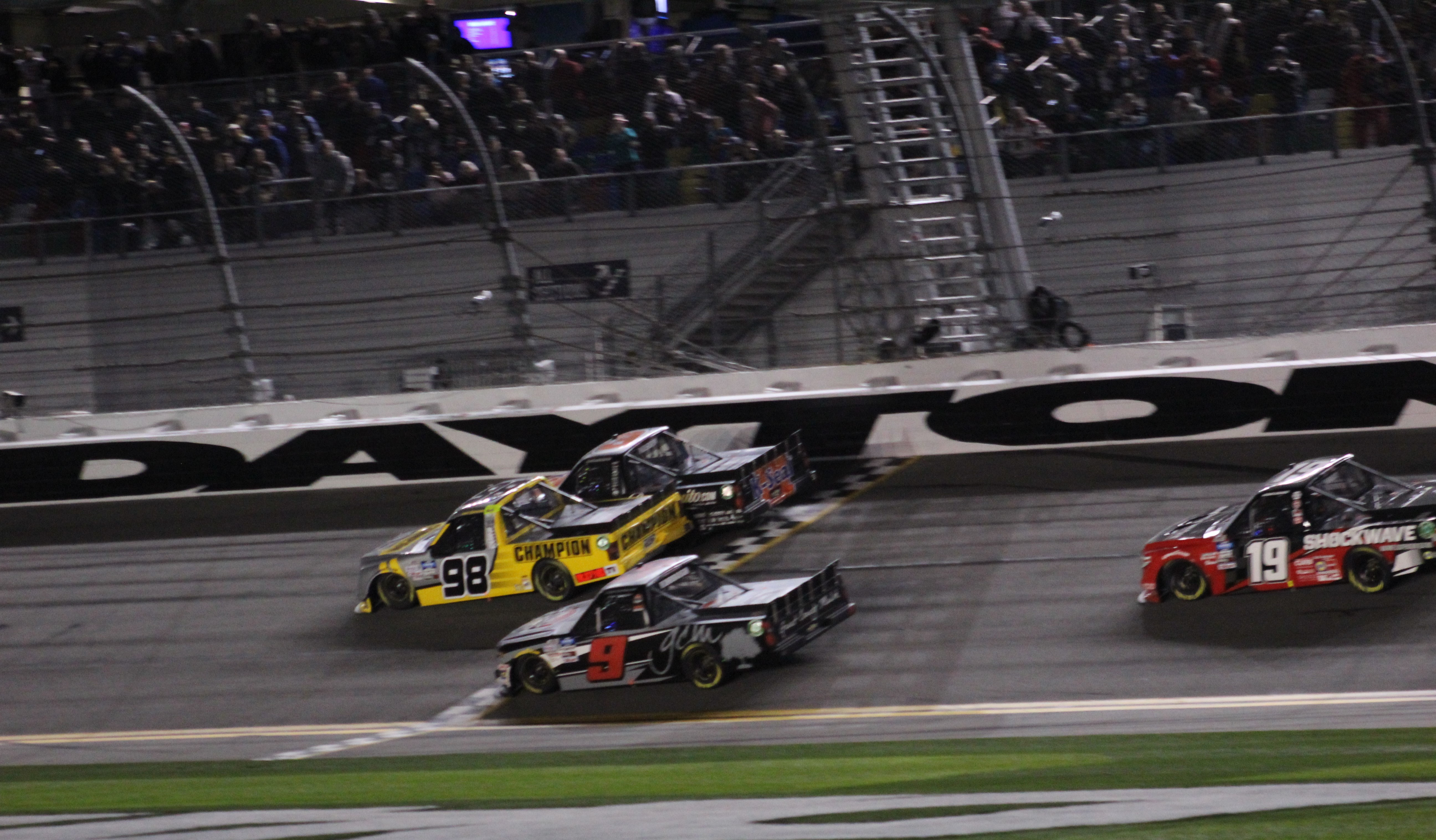
Anderson's photo finish with Grant Enfinger in the 2020 Truck Series season-opener at Daytona. His black and orange No. 3 truck is up against Enfinger's No. 98 truck and the wall.

For the 2019 season, Anderson competed a full schedule in the Truck Series in his No. 3 JAR truck with the exception of Eldora, where Carson Hocevar drove the No. 3. JAR signed Wally Rogers as crew chief midway through the 2019 season.

In the 2020 season opener at Daytona, Anderson nearly won his first Truck race when he escaped numerous wrecks. On the final lap, he passed leader Grant Enfinger as they exited turn four, but Enfinger hindered his momentum by hitting his door, enabling Enfinger to win as Anderson finished a career-best second.

=== 2021–present ===
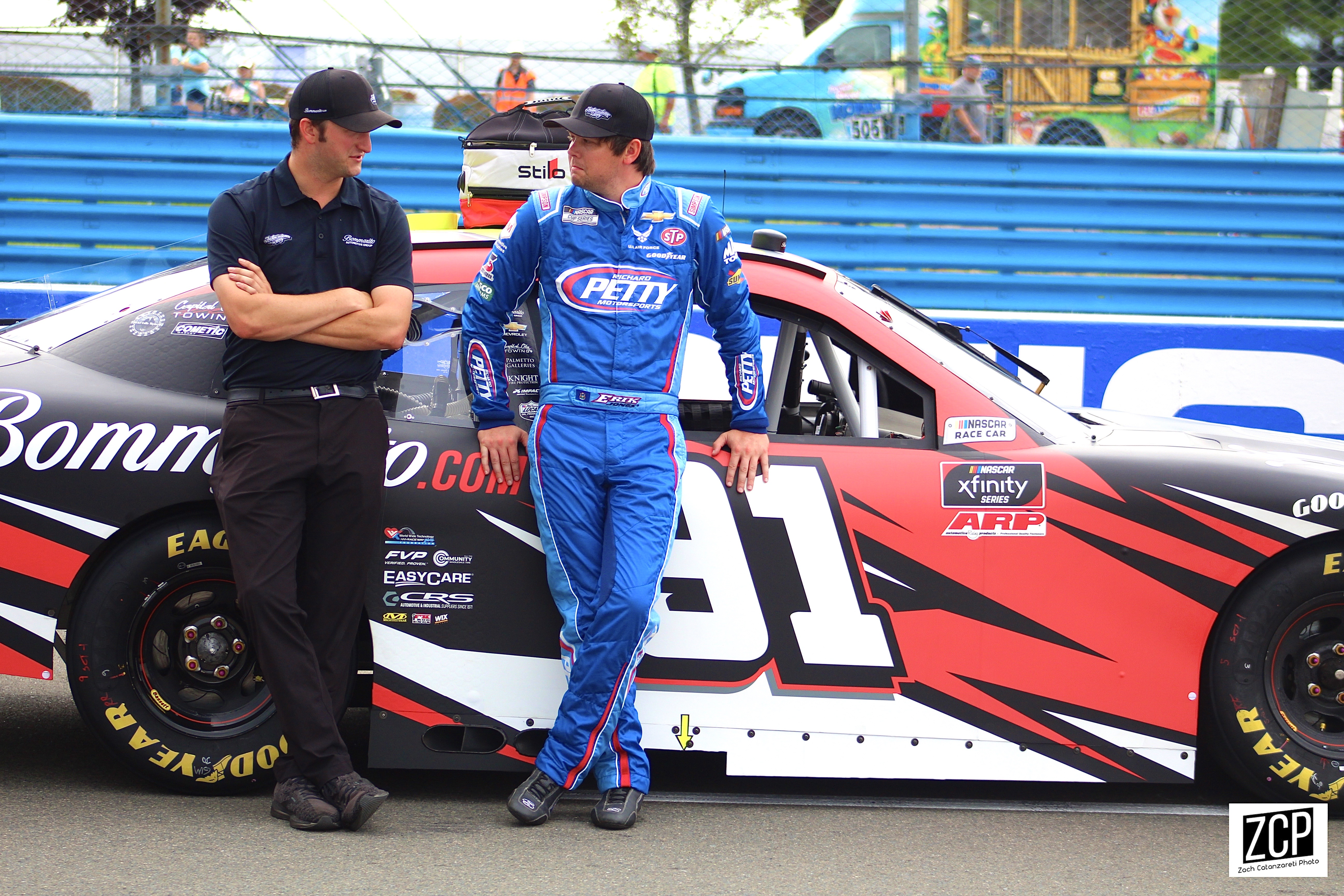
Anderson (left) talking to Erik Jones alongside his No. 31 car, which Jones would drive at Watkins Glen

Anderson moved his team to a full-time Xfinity schedule ahead of the 2021 season, though he continued racing in the Truck Series on a part-time basis. In the Daytona Truck race, Anderson once again finished second when he was beat to the finish by Ben Rhodes, also a ThorSport Racing driver like Enfinger. He did not make the field for the following day's Xfinity opener when rain canceled qualifying. As a result, he would also fail to qualify for the next nine races as qualifying would not resume (due to the COVID-19 pandemic) until the inaugural Pit Boss 250 at the Circuit of the Americas on May 22. On May 4, he switched to Truck Series points in order to compete in the week's Truck race at Darlington, which was a Triple Truck Challenge race that only allowed the series' points-eligible drivers to compete in it. He would finish tenth. Although Anderson initially planned to run the full 2021 Xfinity Series season as a driver, he would scale back to a part-time schedule to make room for more experienced drivers (including Cup Series Chevy drivers Tyler Reddick, Erik Jones and Austin Dillon) in the No. 31 car in order to get it higher in the owner points in time for the next races without qualifying so that the team would not be excluded from the field as they were at the beginning of the season.

In 2022, JAR signed former Richard Childress Racing Xfinity Series driver Myatt Snider to drive their No. 31 car full-time. Anderson would continue competing part-time in the Truck Series in his No. 3 truck and would attempt to qualify for one Xfinity Series race in a new second car for his team, the No. 32, at Michigan but he failed to qualify. In the Talladega Truck Series playoff race on October 1, 2022, Anderson survived a fiery crash, sustaining second-degree burns on his body.

At Talladega on April 22, 2023, just over six months after Anderson suffered the fiery crash, Jeb Burton scored the first win for Anderson's team in all of NASCAR in the Xfinity Series race. Anderson's only start of 2023 as a driver would be in the summer Daytona race in his No. 27 car, with Jeb Burton moving to a third JAR car, the No. 22, for this race. Anderson's father-in-law, NASCAR on Fox commentator Larry McReynolds, would come out of retirement to crew chief him in the No. 27 car in this race.

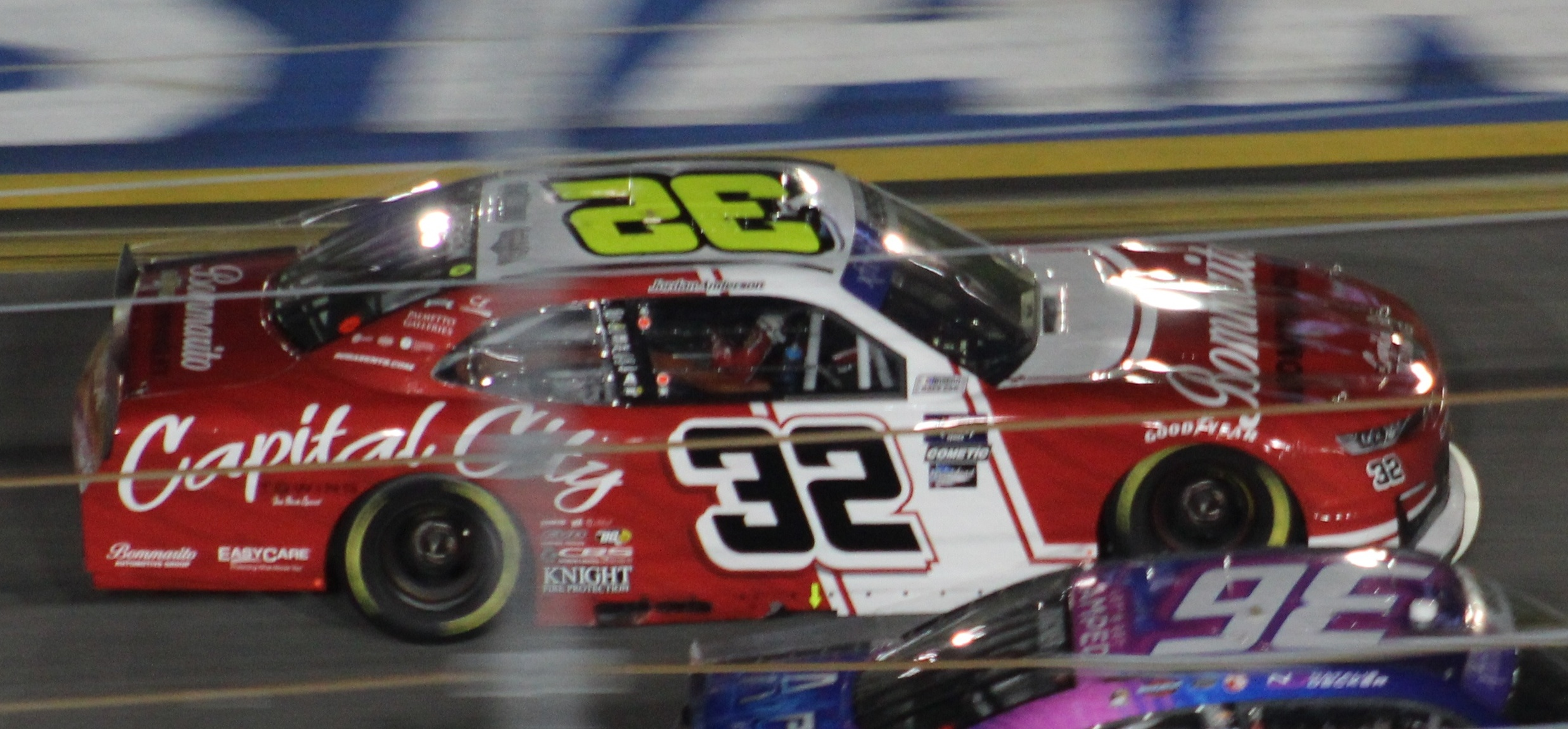
Anderson in his No. 32 car in the season-opener at Daytona in 2024

In 2024, Anderson would run both Daytona and Talladega races as well as the race at Atlanta in February in his No. 32 car.

In 2025, Anderson would drive his No. 32 car in the Xfinity Series season-opener at Daytona again. He would also return to the Truck Series for the first time since his team last fielded an entry in the series in 2022 when he drove the Young's Motorsports No. 20 truck in the race at Indianapolis Raceway Park.

== Personal life ==
Anderson graduated from Belmont Abbey College in Belmont, North Carolina, with a degree in business and marketing, and is said to be one of the hardest-working drivers in the sport, with his hands-on, grassroots approach to his career and sponsorship.

In January 2021, Anderson became engaged to Kendall McReynolds, the daughter of former crew chief and NASCAR on Fox analyst Larry McReynolds. The couple was married in April 2022.

== Motorsports career results ==
=== NASCAR ===
(key) (Bold – Pole position awarded by qualifying time. Italics – Pole position earned by points standings or practice time. * – Most laps led.)

==== O'Reilly Auto Parts Series ====
NASCAR O'Reilly Auto Parts Series results
Year	Team	No.	Make	1	2	3	4	5	6	7	8	9	10	11	12	13	14	15	16	17	18	19	20	21	22	23	24	25	26	27	28	29	30	31	32	33	NOAPSC	Pts	Ref
2015	Mike Harmon Racing	74	Dodge	DAY	ATL	LVS	PHO	CAL	TEX	BRI	RCH	TAL	IOW	CLT	DOV	MCH	CHI	DAY	KEN	NHA	IND	IOW	GLN	MOH	BRI; 36	ROA	DAR	RCH	CHI	KEN	DOV	CLT	KAN	TEX	PHO	HOM	115th	0^{1}	
2016	Obaika Racing	77	Chevy	DAY	ATL	LVS	PHO	CAL	TEX	BRI	RCH	TAL	DOV	CLT	POC	MCH	IOW	DAY	KEN	NHA	IND	IOW	GLN	MOH; 31	BRI	ROA	DAR	RCH									121st	0^{1}	
2016	Obaika Racing	97	Chevy																										CHI; 29	KEN	DOV; 37	CLT; 33	KAN	TEX	PHO		121st	0^{1}	
2016	Precision Performance Motorsports	46	Chevy																																	HOM; 36	121st	0^{1}	
2017	RSS Racing	93	Chevy	DAY	ATL; 39	LVS; 40	PHO; 40	CAL; 40	TEX; 40	BRI; 40	RCH	TAL																									106th	0^{1}	
2017	Mike Harmon Racing	74	Dodge										CLT; DNQ																								106th	0^{1}	
2017	B. J. McLeod Motorsports	78	Chevy											DOV; 26	POC	MCH	IOW	DAY	KEN	NHA	IND	IOW	GLN	MOH	BRI	ROA	DAR	RCH	CHI	KEN	DOV	CLT	KAN	TEX	PHO	HOM	106th	0^{1}	
2021	Jordan Anderson Racing	31	Chevy	DAY; DNQ	DRC; DNQ	HOM; DNQ	LVS; DNQ	PHO; DNQ	ATL; DNQ	MAR; DNQ	TAL; DNQ	DAR; DNQ	DOV; DNQ	COA	CLT	MOH	TEX; 34	NSH	POC	ROA	ATL	NHA; 34	GLN	IRC	MCH; 15	DAY; 22	DAR	RCH	BRI	LVS	TAL; 5	ROV	TEX	KAN; 20	MAR	PHO	81st	0^{2}	
2022	Jordan Anderson Racing	32	Chevy	DAY	CAL	LVS	PHO	ATL	COA	RCH	MAR	TAL	DOV	DAR	TEX	CLT	PIR	NSH	ROA	ATL	NHA	POC	IRC	MCH; DNQ	GLN	DAY	DAR	KAN	BRI	TEX	TAL	ROV	LVS	HOM	MAR	PHO	116th	0	
2023	Jordan Anderson Racing	27	Chevy	DAY	CAL	LVS	PHO	ATL	COA	RCH	MAR	TAL	DOV	DAR	CLT	PIR	SON	NSH	CSC	ATL	NHA	POC	ROA	MCH	IRC	GLN	DAY; 15	DAR	KAN	BRI	TEX	ROV	LVS	HOM	MAR	PHO	54th	22	
2024	Jordan Anderson Racing	32	Chevy	DAY; 4	ATL; 38	LVS	PHO	COA	RCH	MAR	TEX	TAL; 31	DOV	DAR	CLT	PIR	SON	IOW	NHA	NSH	CSC	POC	IND	MCH	DAY; 6	DAR	ATL	GLN	BRI	KAN	TAL; 33	ROV	LVS	HOM	MAR	PHO	41st	75	
2025	Jordan Anderson Racing	32	Chevy	DAY; 7	ATL	COA	PHO	LVS	HOM	MAR	DAR	BRI	CAR	TAL	TEX	CLT	NSH	MXC	POC	ATL	CSC	SON	DOV	IND	IOW	GLN	DAY	PIR	GTW; 38	BRI	KAN	ROV	LVS	TAL; 32	MAR	PHO	48th	36	
2026	Jordan Anderson Racing	32	Chevy	DAY; 4	ATL	COA	PHO	LVS	DAR	MAR	CAR	BRI	KAN	TAL	TEX	GLN	DOV	CLT	NSH	POC	COR	SON	CHI	ATL; 27	IND	IOW	DAY	DAR	GTW; 23	BRI	LVS	CLT	PHO	TAL	MAR	HOM	45th	57	

==== Craftsman Truck Series ====
NASCAR Craftsman Truck Series results
Year	Team	No.	Make	1	2	3	4	5	6	7	8	9	10	11	12	13	14	15	16	17	18	19	20	21	22	23	24	25	NCTC	Pts	Ref
2014	MAKE Motorsports	50	Chevy	DAY	MAR	KAN	CLT	DOV	TEX	GTW	KEN	IOW	ELD	POC	MCH	BRI	MSP	CHI	NHA	LVS	TAL	MAR	TEX	PHO; 24					62nd	34	
2014	Mike Harmon Racing	74	Chevy																						HOM; 30				62nd	34	
2015	Mike Harmon Racing	74	Chevy	DAY; DNQ	ATL; 23	MAR	KAN; 18	CLT; 23	DOV	TEX; 24	GTW; 19	IOW; 22	KEN; 28	ELD	POC; 18	MCH; 13	BRI; DNQ	MSP; 16	CHI; 20	NHA; 25	LVS; 22	TAL; 19	MAR	TEX; 21	PHO; 29	HOM; 29			19th	379	
2016	Bolen Motorsports	66	Chevy	DAY; 30	ATL; DNQ	MAR; DNQ	KAN; 29	DOV; 18	CLT; 24	TEX; 22	IOW; 20	GTW; 11	KEN; 17	ELD; 32	POC; 14	BRI; 16	MCH; 14	MSP; 13	CHI; 23	NHA; 22	LVS	TAL	MAR	TEX; 25		HOM; 24			20th	212	
2016	Mike Harmon Racing	74	Chevy																						PHO; 29				20th	212	
2017	Mike Harmon Racing	74	Chevy	DAY; DNQ																									17th	316	
2017	Rick Ware Racing	12	Chevy		ATL; 28	MAR; 31																							17th	316	
2017	TJL Motorsports	1	Chevy				KAN; 19	CLT; 21	DOV; 24	TEX; 15	GTW; 17	IOW; 15	KEN; 25	ELD	POC; 17	MCH; 23	BRI; 27	MSP; 23	CHI; 21	NHA; 21	LVS; 15	TAL	MAR; 24	TEX; 24	PHO; 13	HOM; 21			17th	316	
2018	Jordan Anderson Racing	3	Toyota	DAY; 9																		TAL; 7							15th	389	
2018	Jordan Anderson Racing	3	Chevy		ATL; 24	LVS; 17	MAR; 22	DOV; 18	KAN; 25	CLT; 20	TEX; 19	IOW; 23	GTW; 23	CHI; 17	KEN; 19	ELD	POC; 16	MCH; 13	BRI; 22	MSP; 16	LVS; 20		MAR; 26	TEX; 29	PHO; 23	HOM; 20			15th	389	
2019	Jordan Anderson Racing	3	Chevy	DAY; 25	ATL; 19	LVS; 21	MAR; 26	TEX; 21	DOV; 21	KAN; 13	CLT; 15	TEX; 15	IOW; 18	GTW; 18	CHI; 20	KEN; 30	POC; 13	ELD	MCH; 14	BRI; 28	MSP; 16	LVS; 14	TAL; 21	MAR; 12	PHO; 28	HOM; 21			16th	397	
2020	Jordan Anderson Racing	3	Chevy	DAY; 2	LVS; 20	CLT; 31	ATL; 37	HOM; 31	POC; 17	KEN; 24	TEX; 28	KAN; 30	KAN; 15	MCH; 32	DRC; 35	DOV; 24	GTW; 17	DAR; 24	RCH; 24	BRI; 23	LVS; 32	TAL; 6	KAN; 30	TEX; 13	MAR; 19	PHO; 22			18th	323	
2021	Jordan Anderson Racing	3	Chevy	DAY; 2	DRC	LVS; 27	ATL; 25	BRD	RCH	KAN; 30	DAR; 10	COA	CLT	TEX	NSH	POC	KNX	GLN; RL^{†}	GTW; 37	DAR; 26	BRI	LVS	TAL; 11	MAR	PHO; 23				39th	79	
2022	Jordan Anderson Racing	3	Chevy	DAY; DNQ	LVS; 26	ATL; 18	COA	MAR	BRD	DAR	KAN	TEX; 14	CLT	GTW; 16	SON	KNX	NSH	MOH	POC	IRP	RCH	KAN	BRI	TAL; 36	HOM	PHO			39th	75	
2025	Young's Motorsports	20	Chevy	DAY	ATL	LVS	HOM	MAR	BRI	CAR	TEX	KAN	NWS	CLT	NSH	MCH	POC	LRP	IRP; 29	GLN	RCH	DAR	BRI	NHA	ROV	TAL	MAR	PHO	104th	0^{1}	
^{†} – Relieved Bobby Reuse

^{*} Season still in progress
^{1} Ineligible for series points
^{2} Switched from Xfinity to Truck points before the spring Darlington race

==== K&N Pro Series East ====
NASCAR K&N Pro Series East results
Year	Team	No.	Make	1	2	3	4	5	6	7	8	9	10	11	12	13	14	15	16	NKNPSEC	Pts	Ref
2013	MacDonald Motorsports	49	Toyota	BRI	GRE; 25	FIF	RCH	BGS	IOW	LGY	COL	IOW	VIR	GRE	NHA	DOV	RAL			71st	19	
2014	Andrew Bloom	91	Toyota	NSM	DAY	BRI	GRE	RCH; 33	IOW	BGS	FIF	LGY	NHA	COL	IOW	GLN	VIR	GRE	DOV	70th	11	
