= 2018 Fr8Auctions 250 =

19th race of the 2018 NASCAR Camping World Truck Series

Race details
- Race 19 of 23 of the 2018 NASCAR Camping World Truck Series
- Date: October 13, 2018
- Official name: 13th Annual Fr8Auctions 250
- Location: Lincoln, Alabama, Talladega Superspeedway
- Course: Permanent racing facility
- Course length: 2.66 miles (4.28 km)
- Distance: 94 laps, 250.04 mi (402.4 km)
- Scheduled distance: 94 laps, 250.04 mi (402.4 km)
- Average speed: 137.911 miles per hour (221.946 km/h)

Pole position
Driver	David Gilliland	Kyle Busch Motorsports
- Time: 53.032

Most laps led
Driver	Grant Enfinger	ThorSport Racing
- Laps: 31

Winner
No. 25	Timothy Peters	GMS Racing

Television in the United States
- Network: FOX
- Announcers: Vince Welch, Michael Waltrip, Kevin Harvick

Radio in the United States
- Radio: Motor Racing Network

The 2018 Fr8Auctions 250 was the 19th stock car race of the 2018 NASCAR Camping World Truck Series season, the third and final race of the Round of 8, and the 13th iteration of the event. The race was held on Saturday, October 13, 2018, Lincoln, Alabama at Talladega Superspeedway, a 2.66 miles (4.28 km) permanent triangle-shaped superspeedway. The race took the scheduled 94 laps to complete. At race's end, GMS Racing driver Timothy Peters would win under caution after a wild wreck on the backstretch that featured Noah Gragson throwing a block on Peters, spinning in the process. The win was Peters' 11th and to date, final NASCAR Camping World Truck Series win and his first and only win of the season. To fill out the podium, Myatt Snider of ThorSport Racing and David Gilliland of Kyle Busch Motorsports would finish second and third, respectively.

== Background ==
The layout of Talladega Superspeedway, the venue where the race was held.

Talladega Superspeedway, originally known as Alabama International Motor Superspeedway (AIMS), is a motorsports complex located north of Talladega, Alabama. It is located on the former Anniston Air Force Base in the small city of Lincoln. The track is a tri-oval and was constructed in the 1960s by the International Speedway Corporation, a business controlled by the France family. Talladega is most known for its steep banking and the unique location of the start/finish line that's located just past the exit to pit road. The track currently hosts the NASCAR series such as the NASCAR Cup Series, Xfinity Series and the Camping World Truck Series. Talladega is the longest NASCAR oval with a length of 2.66-mile-long (4.28 km) tri-oval like the Daytona International Speedway, which also is a 2.5-mile-long (4 km) tri-oval.

=== Entry list ===
#	Driver	Team	Make	Sponsor
0	Ray Ciccarelli	Jennifer Jo Cobb Racing	Chevrolet	Ciccarelli Moving & Installation
2	Spencer Gallagher	GMS Racing	Chevrolet	ISM Connect, Allegiant Air
02	Austin Hill	Young's Motorsports	Chevrolet	Randco, Young's Building Systems
3	Jordan Anderson	Jordan Anderson Racing	Chevrolet	Rusty's Offroad
4	Todd Gilliland	Kyle Busch Motorsports	Toyota	Pedigree Puppys
6	Norm Benning	Norm Benning Racing	Chevrolet	Norm Benning Racing
7	Korbin Forrister	All Out Motorsports	Toyota	N.O.W. Matters More, TruClear
8	John Hunter Nemechek	NEMCO Motorsports	Chevrolet	Fleetwing
10	Jennifer Jo Cobb	Jennifer Jo Cobb Racing	Chevrolet	Driven2Honor.org, Osage Contractors
12	Tanner Thorson	Young's Motorsports	Chevrolet	K&L Ready Mix, Nyloxin
13	Myatt Snider	ThorSport Racing	Ford	RIDE TV
15	Jamie Mosley	Premium Motorsports	Chevrolet	Crossbar, VIP Racing Experience
16	Brett Moffitt	Hattori Racing Enterprises	Toyota	American Red Cross
18	Noah Gragson	Kyle Busch Motorsports	Toyota	Safelite Auto Glass
20	Max Tullman	Young's Motorsports	Chevrolet	Yurpal
21	Johnny Sauter	GMS Racing	Chevrolet	ISM Connect
22	Austin Wayne Self	Niece Motorsports	Chevrolet	AM Technical Solutions, GO TEXAN. "Don't mess with Texas"
24	Justin Haley	GMS Racing	Chevrolet	Fraternal Order of Eagles
25	Timothy Peters	GMS Racing	Chevrolet	Kingman Chevrolet
28	Bryan Dauzat	FDNY Racing	Chevrolet	FDNY, O.B. Builders Door & Trim
30	Scott Lagasse Jr.	On Point Motorsports	Toyota	Strutmasters
33	Robby Lyons	Reaume Brothers Racing	Chevrolet	Sunwest Construction
41	Ben Rhodes	ThorSport Racing	Ford	The Carolina Nut Company
45	Justin Fontaine	Niece Motorsports	Chevrolet	ProMatic Automation
47	Chris Fontaine	Glenden Enterprises	Chevrolet	Glenden Enterprises
49	Wendell Chavous	Premium Motorsports	Chevrolet	SobrietyNation.org
51	David Gilliland	Kyle Busch Motorsports	Toyota	Pedigree
52	Stewart Friesen	Halmar Friesen Racing	Chevrolet	Halmar "We Build America"
54	Bo LeMastus	DGR-Crosley	Toyota	Fred's
63	Bobby Gerhart	MB Motorsports	Chevrolet	Lucas Oil
68	Clay Greenfield	Clay Greenfield Motorsports	Chevrolet	AMVETS #PLEASESTAND
75	Parker Kligerman	Henderson Motorsports	Chevrolet	Food Country USA, Blue-Emu
83	Joey Gase	Copp Motorsports	Chevrolet	PFK Foundation
87	Joe Nemechek	NEMCO Motorsports	Chevrolet	Fleetwing
88	Matt Crafton	ThorSport Racing	Ford	Menards, Fisher Nuts
98	Grant Enfinger	ThorSport Racing	Ford	Champion Power Equipment "Powering Your Life."
Official entry list

== Practice ==
=== First practice ===
The first practice session was held on Friday, October 12, at 9:05 AM CST, and would last for 50 minutes. Justin Haley of GMS Racing would set the fastest time in the session, with a lap of 49.490 and an average speed of 193.494 miles per hour (311.398 km/h).

Pos.	#	Driver	Team	Make	Time	Speed
1	24	Justin Haley	GMS Racing	Chevrolet	49.490	193.494
2	2	Spencer Gallagher	GMS Racing	Chevrolet	49.492	193.486
3	75	Parker Kligerman	Henderson Motorsports	Chevrolet	49.783	192.355
Full first practice results

=== Second and final practice ===
The second and final practice session, sometimes referred to as Happy Hour, was held on Friday, October 12, at 10:35 AM CST, and would last for 50 minutes. Spencer Gallagher of GMS Racing would set the fastest time in the session, with a lap of 52.927 and an average speed of 180.928 miles per hour (291.175 km/h).

Pos.	#	Driver	Team	Make	Time	Speed
1	2	Spencer Gallagher	GMS Racing	Chevrolet	52.927	180.928
2	98	Grant Enfinger	ThorSport Racing	Ford	53.037	180.553
3	4	Todd Gilliland	Kyle Busch Motorsports	Toyota	53.092	180.366
Full Happy Hour practice results

== Qualifying ==
Qualifying was held on Friday, October 12, at 4:35 PM CST. Since Talladega Superspeedway is at least a 1.5 miles (2.4 km) racetrack, the qualifying system was a single car, single lap, two round system where in the first round, everyone would set a time to determine positions 13–32. Then, the fastest 12 qualifiers would move on to the second round to determine positions 1–12.

David Gilliland of Kyle Busch Motorsports would win the pole, setting a lap of 53.032 and an average speed of 180.570 miles per hour (290.599 km/h) in the second round.

Four drivers would fail to qualify: Norm Benning, Joey Gase, Ray Ciccarelli, and Jamie Mosley.

=== Full qualifying results ===
Pos.	#	Driver	Team	Make	Time (R1)	Speed (R1)	Time (R2)	Speed (R2)
1	51	David Gilliland	Kyle Busch Motorsports	Toyota			53.032	180.570
2	2	Spencer Gallagher	GMS Racing	Chevrolet			53.038	180.550
3	25	Timothy Peters	GMS Racing	Chevrolet			53.056	180.489
4	98	Grant Enfinger	ThorSport Racing	Ford			53.146	180.183
5	21	Johnny Sauter	GMS Racing	Chevrolet			53.218	179.939
6	4	Todd Gilliland	Kyle Busch Motorsports	Toyota			53.272	179.757
7	87	Joe Nemechek	NEMCO Motorsports	Chevrolet			53.286	179.709
8	16	Brett Moffitt	Hattori Racing Enterprises	Toyota			53.328	179.568
9	88	Matt Crafton	ThorSport Racing	Ford			53.337	179.538
10	02	Austin Hill	Young's Motorsports	Chevrolet			53.337	179.538
11	52	Stewart Friesen	Halmar Friesen Racing	Chevrolet			53.499	178.994
12	54	Bo LeMastus	DGR-Crosley	Toyota			—	—
Eliminated in Round 1
13	18	Noah Gragson	Kyle Busch Motorsports	Toyota	53.451	179.155	—	—
14	41	Ben Rhodes	ThorSport Racing	Ford	53.528	178.897	—	—
15	7	Korbin Forrister	All Out Motorsports	Toyota	53.645	178.507	—	—
16	24	Justin Haley	GMS Racing	Chevrolet	53.675	178.407	—	—
17	12	Tanner Thorson	Young's Motorsports	Chevrolet	53.690	178.357	—	—
18	68	Clay Greenfield	Clay Greenfield Motorsports	Chevrolet	53.716	178.271	—	—
19	47	Chris Fontaine	Glenden Enterprises	Chevrolet	53.964	177.452	—	—
20	75	Parker Kligerman	Henderson Motorsports	Chevrolet	54.029	177.238	—	—
21	3	Jordan Anderson	Jordan Anderson Racing	Toyota	54.137	176.885	—	—
22	10	Jennifer Jo Cobb	Jennifer Jo Cobb Racing	Chevrolet	54.193	176.702	—	—
23	63	Bobby Gerhart	MB Motorsports	Chevrolet	54.200	176.679	—	—
24	22	Austin Wayne Self	Niece Motorsports	Chevrolet	54.271	176.448	—	—
25	30	Scott Lagasse Jr.	On Point Motorsports	Toyota	54.272	176.445	—	—
26	33	Robby Lyons	Reaume Brothers Racing	Chevrolet	54.319	176.292	—	—
27	28	Bryan Dauzat	FDNY Racing	Chevrolet	54.364	176.146	—	—
Qualified by owner's points
28	13	Myatt Snider	ThorSport Racing	Ford	54.366	176.139	—	—
29	45	Justin Fontaine	Niece Motorsports	Chevrolet	54.371	176.123	—	—
30	20	Max Tullman	Young's Motorsports	Chevrolet	54.404	176.016	—	—
31	8	John Hunter Nemechek	NEMCO Motorsports	Chevrolet	54.412	175.991	—	—
32	49	Wendell Chavous	Premium Motorsports	Chevrolet	55.191	173.507	—	—
Failed to qualify
33	6	Norm Benning	Norm Benning Racing	Chevrolet	54.883	174.480	—	—
34	83	Joey Gase	Copp Motorsports	Chevrolet	54.927	174.340	—	—
35	0	Ray Ciccarelli	Jennifer Jo Cobb Racing	Chevrolet	55.026	174.027	—	—
36	15	Jamie Mosley	Premium Motorsports	Chevrolet	56.848	168.449	—	—
Official starting lineup

== Race results ==
Stage 1 Laps: 20

Pos.	#	Driver	Team	Make	Pts
1	98	Grant Enfinger	ThorSport Racing	Ford	10
2	21	Johnny Sauter	GMS Racing	Chevrolet	9
3	13	Myatt Snider	ThorSport Racing	Ford	8
4	88	Matt Crafton	ThorSport Racing	Ford	7
5	18	Noah Gragson	Kyle Busch Motorsports	Toyota	6
6	4	Todd Gilliland	Kyle Busch Motorsports	Toyota	5
7	51	David Gilliland	Kyle Busch Motorsports	Toyota	4
8	24	Justin Haley	GMS Racing	Chevrolet	3
9	41	Ben Rhodes	ThorSport Racing	Ford	2
10	8	John Hunter Nemechek	NEMCO Motorsports	Chevrolet	0

Stage 2 Laps: 20

Pos.	#	Driver	Team	Make	Pts
1	4	Todd Gilliland	Kyle Busch Motorsports	Toyota	10
2	88	Matt Crafton	ThorSport Racing	Ford	9
3	21	Johnny Sauter	GMS Racing	Chevrolet	8
4	41	Ben Rhodes	ThorSport Racing	Ford	7
5	8	John Hunter Nemechek	NEMCO Motorsports	Chevrolet	0
6	02	Austin Hill	Young's Motorsports	Chevrolet	5
7	10	Jennifer Jo Cobb	Jennifer Jo Cobb Racing	Chevrolet	4
8	24	Justin Haley	GMS Racing	Chevrolet	3
9	75	Parker Kligerman	Henderson Motorsports	Chevrolet	2
10	13	Myatt Snider	ThorSport Racing	Ford	1

Stage 3 Laps: 54

Fin	St	#	Driver	Team	Make	Laps	Led	Status	Pts
1	3	25	Timothy Peters	GMS Racing	Chevrolet	94	1	running	40
2	28	13	Myatt Snider	ThorSport Racing	Ford	94	0	running	44
3	1	51	David Gilliland	Kyle Busch Motorsports	Toyota	94	0	running	38
4	16	24	Justin Haley	GMS Racing	Chevrolet	94	2	running	39
5	32	49	Wendell Chavous	Premium Motorsports	Chevrolet	94	0	running	32
6	11	52	Stewart Friesen	Halmar Friesen Racing	Chevrolet	94	0	running	31
7	21	3	Jordan Anderson	Jordan Anderson Racing	Toyota	94	0	running	30
8	27	28	Bryan Dauzat	FDNY Racing	Chevrolet	94	0	running	29
9	30	20	Max Tullman	Young's Motorsports	Chevrolet	94	0	running	0
10	10	02	Austin Hill	Young's Motorsports	Chevrolet	94	8	running	32
11	22	10	Jennifer Jo Cobb	Jennifer Jo Cobb Racing	Chevrolet	94	3	running	30
12	24	22	Austin Wayne Self	Niece Motorsports	Chevrolet	94	0	running	25
13	13	18	Noah Gragson	Kyle Busch Motorsports	Toyota	93	3	crash	30
14	26	33	Robby Lyons	Reaume Brothers Racing	Chevrolet	93	0	crash	23
15	15	7	Korbin Forrister	All Out Motorsports	Toyota	93	0	crash	22
16	14	41	Ben Rhodes	ThorSport Racing	Ford	93	0	running	30
17	8	16	Brett Moffitt	Hattori Racing Enterprises	Toyota	92	0	running	20
18	25	30	Scott Lagasse Jr.	On Point Motorsports	Toyota	92	0	running	0
19	4	98	Grant Enfinger	ThorSport Racing	Ford	92	31	running	28
20	6	4	Todd Gilliland	Kyle Busch Motorsports	Toyota	82	13	crash	32
21	29	45	Justin Fontaine	Niece Motorsports	Chevrolet	82	0	electrical	16
22	5	21	Johnny Sauter	GMS Racing	Chevrolet	73	8	crash	32
23	23	63	Bobby Gerhart	MB Motorsports	Chevrolet	61	0	electrical	14
24	19	47	Chris Fontaine	Glenden Enterprises	Chevrolet	58	0	crash	13
25	2	2	Spencer Gallagher	GMS Racing	Chevrolet	58	15	crash	0
26	9	88	Matt Crafton	ThorSport Racing	Ford	58	7	crash	27
27	31	8	John Hunter Nemechek	NEMCO Motorsports	Chevrolet	58	0	crash	0
28	20	75	Parker Kligerman	Henderson Motorsports	Chevrolet	58	0	crash	11
29	12	54	Bo LeMastus	DGR-Crosley	Toyota	58	1	crash	8
30	7	87	Joe Nemechek	NEMCO Motorsports	Chevrolet	50	2	vibration	7
31	17	12	Tanner Thorson	Young's Motorsports	Chevrolet	48	0	suspension	6
32	18	68	Clay Greenfield	Clay Greenfield Motorsports	Chevrolet	47	0	suspension	5
Failed to qualify
33		6	Norm Benning	Norm Benning Racing	Chevrolet				
34		83	Joey Gase	Copp Motorsports	Chevrolet				
35		0	Ray Ciccarelli	Jennifer Jo Cobb Racing	Chevrolet				
36		15	Jamie Mosley	Premium Motorsports	Chevrolet				
Official race results

Previous race: 2018 World of Westgate 200	NASCAR Camping World Truck Series; 2018 season	Next race: 2018 Texas Roadhouse 200
