= Timothy Peters =

American racing driver (born 1980)

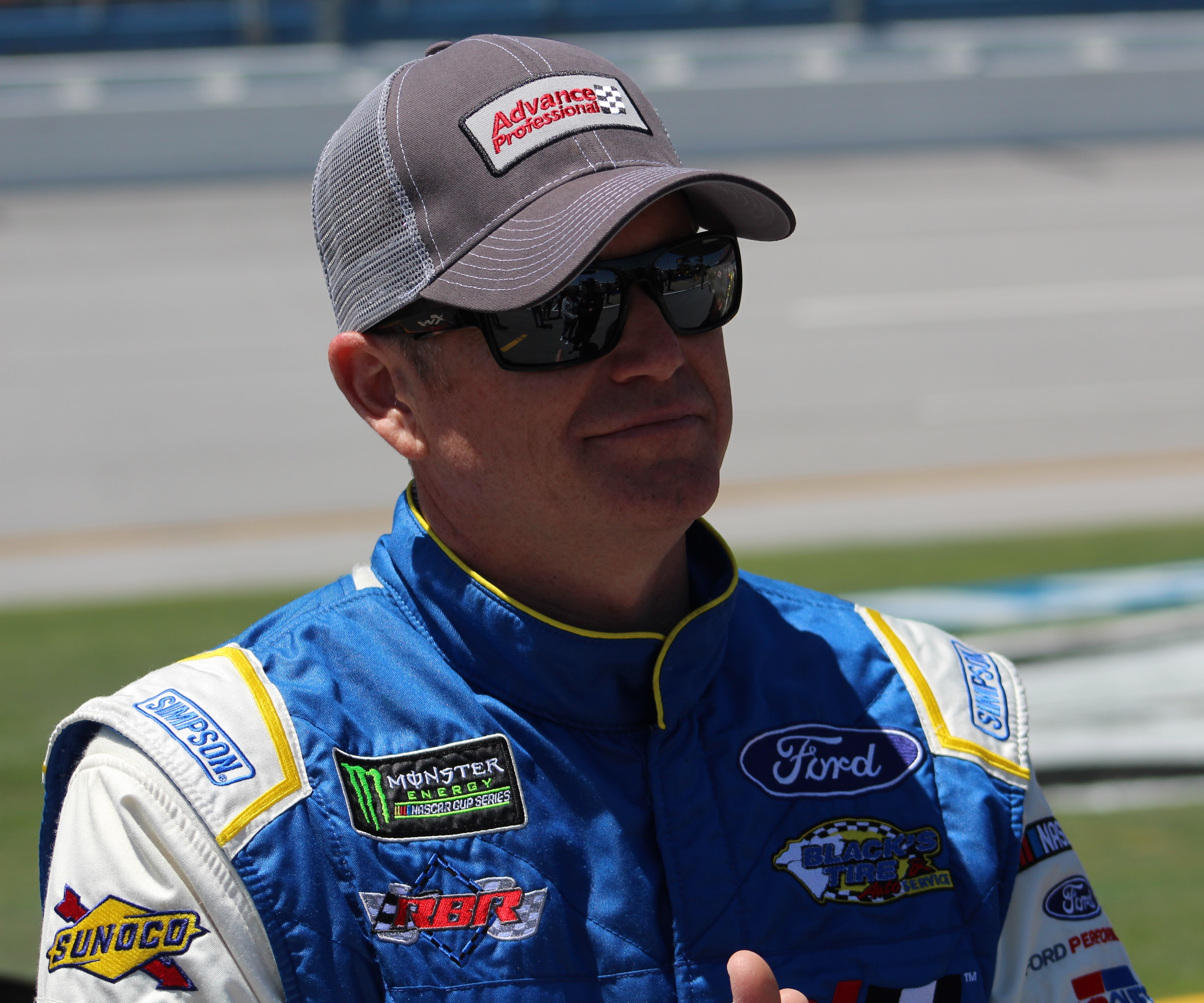
- Peters at Talladega Superspeedway in 2018
- Born: Timothy Jason Peters; August 29, 1980 (age 46); Danville, Virginia, U.S.
- Achievements: 2017 Virginia Late Model Triple Crown Series Champion; 2003 Myrtle Beach 400 Winner; 2005, 2017 ValleyStar Credit Union 300 Winner; 2015 Denny Hamlin Short Track Showdown Winner

NASCAR Cup Series career
- 1 race run over 1 year
- 2018 position: 62nd
- Best finish: 62nd (2018)
- First race: 2018 GEICO 500 (Talladega)
Wins	Top tens	Poles
0	0	0

NASCAR O'Reilly Auto Parts Series career
- 8 races run over 2 years
- 2007 position: 62nd
- Best finish: 62nd (2007)
- First race: 2006 Sam's Town 250 (Memphis)
- Last race: 2007 Meijer 300 (Kentucky)
Wins	Top tens	Poles
0	0	0

NASCAR FedEx Freight Truck Series career
- 258 races run over 17 years
- 2021 position: 32nd
- Best finish: 2nd (2012)
- First race: 2005 Kroger 250 (Martinsville)
- Last race: 2021 North Carolina Education Lottery 200 (Charlotte)
- First win: 2009 Kroger 200 (Martinsville)
- Last win: 2018 Fr8Auctions 250 (Talladega)
Wins	Top tens	Poles
11	129	8

ARCA Menards Series career
- 2 races run over 2 years
- Best finish: 107th (2007)
- First race: 2006 Food World 250 (Talladega)
- Last race: 2007 ARCA 200 at Daytona (Daytona)
Wins	Top tens	Poles
0	1	0
- Statistics up to date as of December 30, 2021.

Timothy Jason Peters (born August 29, 1980) is an American professional stock car racing driver. He last competed part-time in the NASCAR Camping World Truck Series, driving the No. 25 Chevrolet Silverado for Rackley W.A.R.. He was a member of the Bobby Hamilton Racing and Richard Childress Racing driver development programs. Peters is a veteran of NASCAR's Truck Series, having driven for the defunct Red Horse Racing team full-time for eight years.

== Racing career ==
Peters began his NASCAR career in 2005 in what was then the Craftsman Truck Series. He had two top-ten finishes in sixteen events in the No. 4 Bailey's Cigarettes Dodge for Bobby Hamilton Racing. In 2006, he returned to the same truck during most of the year, earning one top-ten at Milwaukee. However, Peters left the team in early September and joined Richard Childress Racing, where he was to share their No. 21 AutoZone Chevy with Kevin Harvick in the Busch Series in 2007 before he was released after making six starts. His best result in the series was two thirteenth place finishes. He made two starts that season in the Truck Series, driving the No. 46 for Morgan-Dollar Motorsports, and had a ninth-place finish at Martinsville.

After making another start at Martinsville for Morgan-Dollar in 2008, he began driving the No. 17 for Premier Racing, a team that he co-owned. He and Premier ran a limited schedule in 2008 with a tenth-place run at Martinsville and was scheduled to run full-time in 2009. Peters scored two consecutive top-tens at Daytona and California, putting his team fourth in owners points. After Texas, Peters took both his sponsor and crew chief and joined Red Horse Racing for the remainder of the 2009 season. Peters won his first NASCAR Camping World Truck Series race on October 24, 2009, for Red Horse Racing at Martinsville Speedway, after pitting on lap 34 and making the distance. He came close to winning the last race at Homestead, but lost the lead with two laps to go, as Kevin Harvick won the race.

In 2010, Peters returned to Red Horse for the full season in the No. 17 and started the year off with a win the season-opener at Daytona after passing Todd Bodine on the last lap.

For 2011, Peters returned to RHR and scored twelve top-ten finishes, as well as his third career win at Lucas Oil Raceway at Indianapolis. Peters would finish the year fifth in points.

For 2012, Peters won his first race of the season at Iowa and would later follow that up with a flag to flag victory at Bristol.

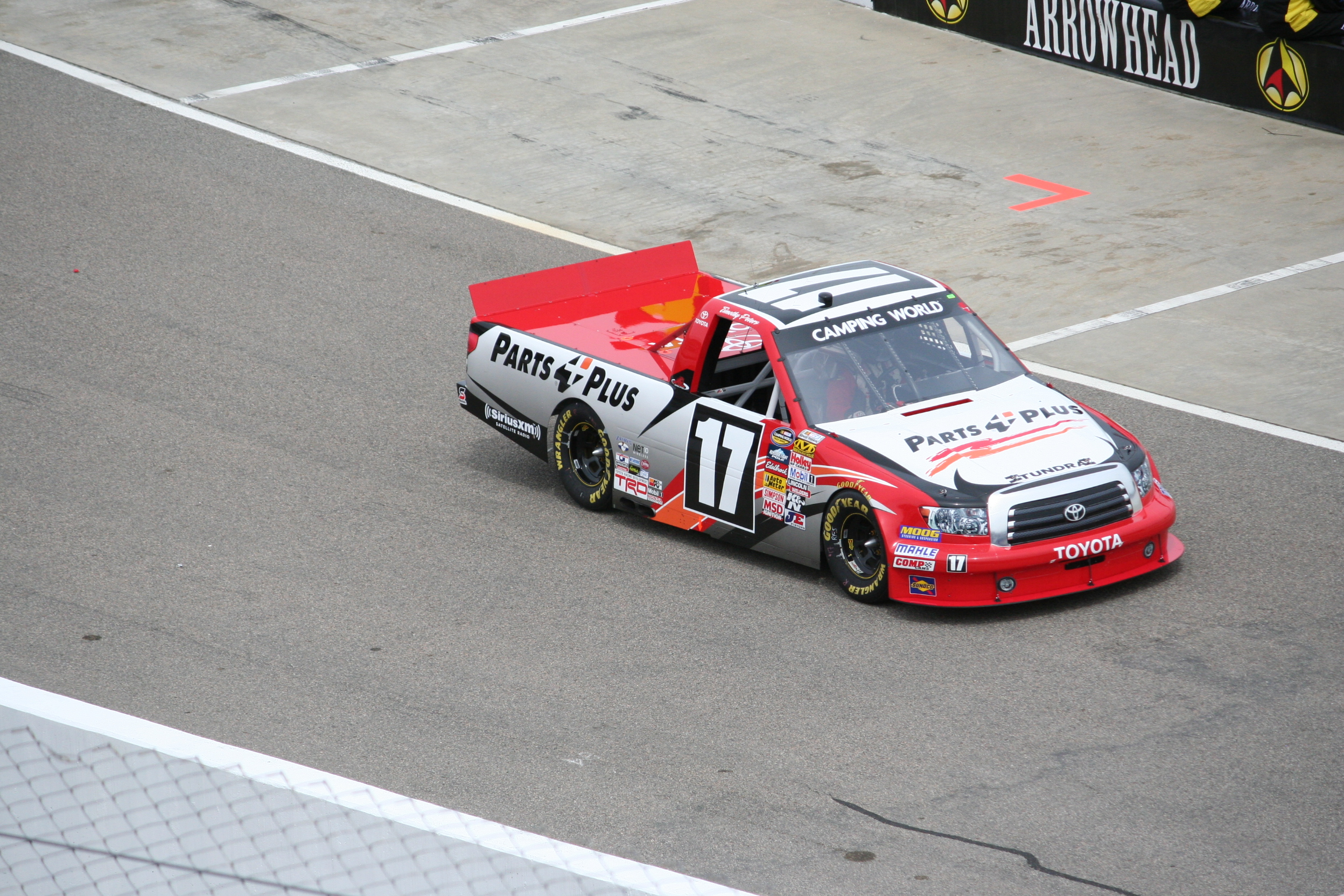
Peters at Rockingham in 2013

For 2013, Peters won his first race of the season at Iowa while Erik Jones finished second and would later follow that up with a victory at Las Vegas while Johnny Sauter finished second.

In 2014, Peters passed Kyle Busch with five laps to go in the NextEra Energy Resources 250. However, Busch would beat Peters dramatically by 0.017 to win the race leading the 2010 Mountain Dew 250 at Talladega as the closest truck finish. Peters ran in the top-five early at Iowa in July 2014, but got into an accident with Ron Hornaday Jr. In reply to Hornaday shoving Peters into the outside wall, Peters retaliated and spun Hornaday two laps after the previous collision. For his actions, NASCAR parked him for the rest of the race, though Peters was too damaged to continue so his parking made no difference in Peters' final result. Peters finished 31st.

For 2015, Peters got two wins, he won from the pole at Talladega for the Fred's 250 and got back to back victories, because he also won the previous year, and would follow up with another win at a wreck filled Phoenix race, the Lucas Oil 150, getting his tenth Truck career win after Championship contenders Matt Crafton and Erik Jones wrecked while battling for the lead.

2016 saw the first winless season of Peters' full-time truck career, but nonetheless, he qualified for the final round of the inaugural Truck chase and finished fourth in the standings.

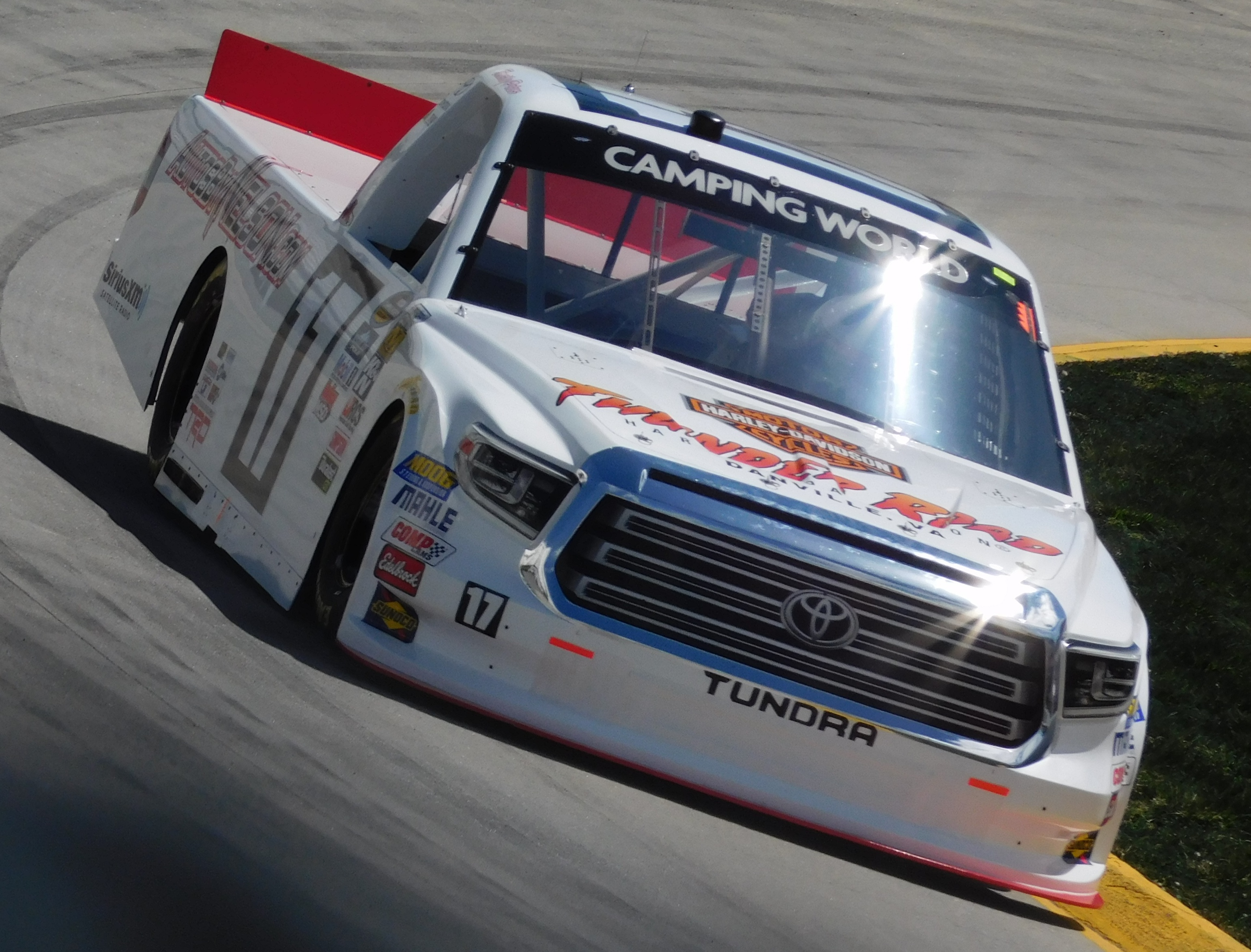
Peters at Martinsville in April 2017, which was one of his final starts for Red Horse Racing

In 2017, after a normal start to the year, on May 22 after the Charlotte race, Red Horse Racing closed down due to lack of sponsorship, an issue that had affected the team for years. This left Peters and teammate Brett Moffitt without rides. At the time of the team's shutdown, Peters was sixth in points. He drove a single race for MDM Motorsports at Texas Motor Speedway. Out of turn four on the second to last lap of the race, Austin Wayne Self got loose and hit the wall. Self then came back down and hit Peters causing him to spin into the grass. The front end dug into the grass and got lifted up in the air. The truck then spun 180 degrees, and the front of the truck came down. This caused the truck to launch 10–20 feet in the air and land on its roof. The truck slid for hundreds of feet and didn't flip back over. He was okay after the crash and finished thirteenth. Peters drove two races for Young's Motorsports, Las Vegas with an 11th-place finish, and Homestead with a 10th-place finish.

For the 2018 season, Peters joined RBR Enterprises at Martinsville, finishing seventh. He and the team attempted Charlotte as well, but rain ended up canceling qualifying, which sent the team home. It was the first time in his career he failed to qualify for a race. In April 2018, he made his Monster Energy NASCAR Cup Series debut at Talladega, driving the No. 92 Advance Auto Parts / BB&T Ford Fusion for RBR. He finished 23rd after starting 32nd. Peters and the team came back to Daytona in the summer, but failed to qualify. In late August, he began racing for GMS Racing in the truck series, occupying the No. 25 entry for the team due to the release of Dalton Sargeant. Peters won the Talladega race after avoiding a last-lap crash involving Noah Gragson.

In 2019, Peters signed with Niece Motorsports to run the Truck Series' first three races in their No. 44 Chevrolet Silverado. He would also return to the No. 92 RBR truck for two races at Charlotte and Bristol, but he failed to qualify for both. The other race he ran that year was Talladega in the NEMCO Motorsports No. 87, attempting to defend his win from the prior year.

In 2020, Peters was without a ride all year until he got the call to substitute for Stewart Friesen in his No. 52 Toyota at Kansas in October. When the race was moved from Friday to Saturday of that weekend just weeks before, Friesen had already committed to run the Short Track Super Series Speed Showcase 200 dirt race, and because he was not in the Truck Series playoffs, decided to skip the Truck race. The team had previously announced Christopher Bell as Friesen's substitute, unaware that he was ineligible to compete due to Cup Series drivers being ineligible to run any Truck Series playoff races, which led to Peters getting the ride for that race.

In January 2021, it was announced that Peters would drive for Rackley W.A.R. in the 2021 NASCAR Camping World Truck Series season. He departed the team in June after ten races; at the time, Peters was 21st in points with two top-twenty finishes. He has not competed in NASCAR since then.

== Personal life ==
Peters married his longtime girlfriend, Sara Haskins Peters, on May 19, 2007. They have two children, a son named Brantley, born in 2012, and Macie, born in 2015.

== Motorsports career results ==
=== Racing career summary ===
Season	Series	Team	Races	Wins	Top 5	Top 10	Points	Position
2005	NASCAR Craftsman Truck Series	Bobby Hamilton Racing	16	0	0	2	1568	28th
2006	NASCAR Craftsman Truck Series	Bobby Hamilton Racing	17	0	0	1	1762	27th
2006	NASCAR Busch Series	Richard Childress Racing	1	0	0	0	124	105th
2006	ARCA Re/Max Series	Richard Childress Racing	1	0	0	0	145	121st
2007	NASCAR Craftsman Truck Series	Morgan-Dollar Motorsports	2	0	0	1	193	74th
2007	NASCAR Busch Series	Richard Childress Racing	7	0	0	0	646	62nd
2007	ARCA Re/Max Series	Richard Childress Racing	1	0	0	1	200	107th
2008	NASCAR Craftsman Truck Series	Premier Racing	8	0	0	1	743	36th
2009	NASCAR Camping World Truck Series	Premier Racing	8	0	0	2	3289	8th
2009	NASCAR Camping World Truck Series	Red Horse Racing	17	1	5	11	3289	8th
2010	NASCAR Camping World Truck Series	Red Horse Racing	25	1	5	16	3343	6th
2011	NASCAR Camping World Truck Series	Red Horse Racing	25	1	7	12	832	5th
2012	NASCAR Camping World Truck Series	Red Horse Racing	22	2	10	16	802	**2nd**
2013	NASCAR Camping World Truck Series	Red Horse Racing	22	2	4	11	683	10th
2014	NASCAR Camping World Truck Series	Red Horse Racing	22	1	9	13	746	5th
2015	NASCAR Camping World Truck Series	Red Horse Racing	23	2	8	16	804	5th
2016	CARS Late Model Stock Car Tour	Nelson Motorsports	1	1	1	1	35	29th
2016	NASCAR Camping World Truck Series	Red Horse Racing	23	0	8	16	4024	4th
2017	CARS Late Model Stock Car Tour	Nelson Motorsports	1	0	1	1	30	38th
2017	NASCAR Camping World Truck Series	Red Horse Racing	5	0	1	3	252	21st
2017	NASCAR Camping World Truck Series	MDM Motorsports	1	0	0	0	252	21st
2017	NASCAR Camping World Truck Series	Young's Motorsports	2	0	0	1	252	21st
2018	CARS Late Model Stock Car Tour	Nelson Motorsports	3	0	1	2	73	20th
2018	NASCAR Camping World Truck Series	GMS Racing	4	1	2	3	161	28th
2018	NASCAR Camping World Truck Series	RBR Enterprises	1	0	0	1	161	28th
2018	Monster Energy NASCAR Cup Series	RBR Enterprises	1	0	0	0	0	NC†
2019	CARS Late Model Stock Car Tour	Nelson Motorsports	2	0	1	1	46	33rd
2019	NASCAR Gander Outdoors Truck Series	Niece Motorsports	3	0	0	2	98	35th
2019	NASCAR Gander Outdoors Truck Series	NEMCO Motorsports	1	0	0	0	98	35th
2020	CARS Late Model Stock Car Tour	Nelson Motorsports	3	0	1	1	58	25th
2020	NASCAR Gander Outdoors Truck Series	Halmar Friesen Racing	1	0	0	1	30	53rd
2021	CARS Late Model Stock Car Tour	Nelson Motorsports	3	0	1	1	49	26th
2021	NASCAR Camping World Truck Series	Rackley W.A.R.	10	0	0	0	119	32nd
2023	CARS Late Model Stock Car Tour	BH Motorsports	1	0	0	0	5	88th
2024	CARS Late Model Stock Car Tour	BH Motorsports	1	0	0	1	0	N/A

^{†} As Peters was a guest driver, he was ineligible for championship points.

=== NASCAR ===
(key) (Bold – Pole position awarded by qualifying time. Italics – Pole position earned by points standings or practice time. * – Most laps led. ** – All laps led.)

==== Monster Energy Cup Series ====
Monster Energy NASCAR Cup Series results
Year	Team	No.	Make	1	2	3	4	5	6	7	8	9	10	11	12	13	14	15	16	17	18	19	20	21	22	23	24	25	26	27	28	29	30	31	32	33	34	35	36	MENCC	Pts	Ref
2018	RBR Enterprises	92	Ford	DAY	ATL	LVS	PHO	CAL	MAR	TEX	BRI	RCH	TAL; 23	DOV	KAN	CLT	POC	MCH	SON	CHI	DAY; DNQ	KEN	NHA	POC	GLN	MCH	BRI	DAR	IND	LVS	RCH	ROV	DOV	TAL	KAN	MAR	TEX	PHO	HOM	62nd	0^{1}	

==== Busch Series ====
NASCAR Busch Series results
Year	Team	No.	Make	1	2	3	4	5	6	7	8	9	10	11	12	13	14	15	16	17	18	19	20	21	22	23	24	25	26	27	28	29	30	31	32	33	34	35	NBSC	Pts	Ref
2006	Richard Childress Racing	29	Chevy	DAY	CAL	MXC	LVS	ATL	BRI	TEX	NSH	PHO	TAL	RCH	DAR	CLT	DOV	NSH	KEN	MLW	DAY	CHI	NHA	MAR	GTW	IRP	GLN	MCH	BRI	CAL	RCH	DOV	KAN	CLT	MEM; 13	TEX	PHO	HOM	105th	124	
2007	Richard Childress Racing	21	Chevy	DAY	CAL; 17	MXC	LVS	ATL	BRI; 25	NSH; 32	TEX; 41	PHO; 13	TAL	RCH	DAR	CLT	DOV	NSH; 20	KEN; 17	MLW	NHA	DAY	CHI	GTW	IRP	CGV	GLN	MCH	BRI	CAL	RCH	DOV	KAN	CLT	MEM	TEX	PHO	HOM	62nd	646	

==== Camping World Truck Series ====
NASCAR Camping World Truck Series results
Year	Team	No.	Make	1	2	3	4	5	6	7	8	9	10	11	12	13	14	15	16	17	18	19	20	21	22	23	24	25	NCWTC	Pts	Ref
2005	Bobby Hamilton Racing	4	Dodge	DAY	CAL	ATL	MAR; 18	GTW; 16	MFD	CLT; 32	DOV; 6	TEX; 32	MCH; 25	MLW	KAN	KEN; 28	MEM; 18	IRP; 28	NSH; 33	BRI; 19	RCH; 29	NHA	LVS; 26	MAR; 8	ATL; 18	TEX	PHO	HOM; 15	28th	1568	
2006	Bobby Hamilton Racing	4	Dodge	DAY; 12	CAL; 24	ATL; 33	MAR; 35	GTW; 32	CLT; 23	MFD; 11	DOV; 14	TEX; 20		MLW; 6	KAN; 19	KEN; 25	MEM; 12	IRP; 15	NSH; 19	BRI; 33	NHA	LVS	TAL	MAR	ATL	TEX	PHO	HOM	27th	1762	
2006	Bobby Hamilton Racing	04	Dodge										MCH; 35																27th	1762	
2007	Morgan-Dollar Motorsports	46	Chevy	DAY	CAL	ATL	MAR; 9	KAN	CLT	MFD	DOV	TEX	MCH	MLW	MEM	KEN	IRP	NSH	BRI; 36	GTW	NHA	LVS	TAL	MAR	ATL	TEX	PHO	HOM	74th	193	
2008	Premier Racing	47	Chevy	DAY	CAL	ATL	MAR; 19	KAN																					36th	743	
2008	Premier Racing	17	Dodge						CLT; 25	MFD	DOV	TEX	MCH	MLW	MEM	KEN; 19	IRP	NSH; 15	BRI; 30	GTW	NHA; 23	LVS	TAL	MAR; 10	ATL	TEX	PHO		36th	743	
2008	Premier Racing	17	Toyota																									HOM; 15	36th	743	
2009	Premier Racing	17	Toyota	DAY; 6	CAL; 9	ATL; 15	MAR; 22	KAN; 24	CLT; 31	DOV; 17	TEX; 12																		8th	3289	
2009	Red Horse Racing	17	Toyota									MCH; 8	MLW; 18	MEM; 7	KEN; 4	IRP; 17	**NSH**; 4	BRI; 10	CHI; 9	IOW; 8	GTW; 7	NHA; 19	LVS; 5		TAL; 11	TEX; 19	PHO; 16	HOM; 4	8th	3289	
2009	Red Horse Racing	1	Toyota																					MAR; 1*					8th	3289	
2010	Red Horse Racing	17	Toyota	DAY; 1	ATL; 7	MAR; 4	NSH; 4	KAN; 23	DOV; 25	CLT; 10	TEX; 7	MCH; 6	IOW; 27	GTW; 6	**IRP**; 10	POC; 8	NSH; 4	**DAR**; 2	BRI; 8	CHI; 21	KEN; 6	NHA; 6	LVS; 26	MAR; 34	TAL; 7	TEX; 12	PHO; 13	HOM; 17	6th	3343	
2011	Red Horse Racing	17	Toyota	DAY; 11	PHO; 12	DAR; 6	MAR; 5	NSH; 3	DOV; 17	**CLT**; 32	KAN; 14	TEX; 20	KEN; 16	IOW; 11	NSH; 3	IRP; 1	POC; 10	MCH; 2	BRI; 5	ATL; 16	CHI; 17	NHA; 9	KEN; 17	LVS; 3	TAL; 23	MAR; 8	TEX; 11	HOM; 8	5th	832	
2012	Red Horse Racing	17	Toyota	DAY; 2	MAR; 5	CAR; 5	KAN; 2	CLT; 9	DOV; 9	TEX; 11	KEN; 5	**IOW**; 1*	CHI; 3	POC; 22	MCH; 13	BRI; 1**	ATL; 13	IOW; 19	KEN; 21	LVS; 8	TAL; 5	**MAR**; 7	TEX; 10	PHO; 4	HOM; 8				2nd	802	
2013	Red Horse Racing	17	Toyota	DAY; 27	MAR; 4	CAR; 26	KAN; 10	CLT; 26	DOV; 6	TEX; 14	KEN; 6	IOW; 1	ELD; 6	POC; 14	MCH; 6	BRI; 2*	MSP; 8	IOW; 12	CHI; 27	LVS; 1	TAL; 29	MAR; 26	TEX; 16	PHO; 16	HOM; 9				10th	683	
2014	Red Horse Racing	17	Toyota	DAY; 2	MAR; 6	KAN; 14	CLT; 5	DOV; 10	TEX; 24	GTW; 3	KEN; 4	IOW; 31	ELD; 16	POC; 12	MCH; 7	BRI; 26	MSP; 10	CHI; 17	NHA; 11	LVS; 4	TAL; 1*	MAR; 2	TEX; 3	PHO; 19	HOM; 3				5th	746	
2015	Red Horse Racing	17	Toyota	DAY; 24	ATL; 9	MAR; 18	KAN; 4	CLT; 7	DOV; 20	TEX; 21	GTW; 6	IOW; 6	KEN; 5	ELD; 23	POC; 7	MCH; 8	BRI; 12	MSP; 22	CHI; 3	NHA; 4	LVS; 2	**TAL**; 1	MAR; 6	TEX; 6	PHO; 1	HOM; 5			5th	804	
2016	Red Horse Racing	17	Toyota	DAY; 15	ATL; 3	MAR; 5	KAN; 8	DOV; 14	CLT; 7	TEX; 6	IOW; 11	GTW; 10	KEN; 9	ELD; 27	POC; 4	BRI; 13	MCH; 2*	MSP; 18	CHI; 8	NHA; 5	**LVS**; 9	TAL; 3	MAR; 5	TEX; 14	PHO; 5	HOM; 9			4th	4024	
2017	Red Horse Racing	17	Toyota	DAY; 17	ATL; 9	MAR; 8	KAN; 13	CLT; 5	DOV																				21st	252	
2017	MDM Motorsports	99	Chevy							TEX; 13	GTW	IOW	KEN	ELD	POC	MCH	BRI	MSP	CHI	NHA									21st	252	
2017	Young's Motorsports	02	Chevy																		LVS; 11	TAL	MAR	TEX	PHO	HOM; 10			21st	252	
2018	RBR Enterprises	92	Ford	DAY	ATL	LVS	MAR; 7	DOV	KAN	CLT; DNQ	TEX	IOW	GTW	CHI	KEN	ELD	POC	MCH	BRI; DNQ										28th	161	
2018	GMS Racing	25	Chevy																	MSP; 4	LVS; 19	TAL; 1							28th	161	
2018	GMS Racing	23	Chevy																				MAR; 10	TEX	PHO	HOM			28th	161	
2019	Niece Motorsports	44	Chevy	DAY; 7	ATL; 10	LVS; 12	MAR	TEX	DOV	KAN																			35th	98	
2019	RBR Enterprises	92	Ford								CLT; DNQ	TEX	IOW	GTW	CHI	KEN	POC	ELD	MCH	BRI; DNQ	MSP	LVS							35th	98	
2019	NEMCO Motorsports	87	Chevy																				TAL; 23	MAR	PHO	HOM			35th	98	
2020	Halmar Friesen Racing	52	Toyota	DAY	LVS	CLT	ATL	HOM	POC	KEN	TEX	KAN	KAN	MCH	DRC	DOV	GTW	DAR	RCH	BRI	LVS	TAL	KAN; 7	TEX	MAR	PHO			53rd	30	
2021	Rackley W.A.R.	25	Chevy	DAY; 26	DRC; 24	LVS; 16	ATL; 30	BRD; 30	RCH; 22	KAN; 21	DAR; 19	COA; 32	CLT; 38	TEX	NSH	POC	KNX	GLN	GTW	DAR	BRI	LVS	TAL	MAR	PHO				32nd	119	

^{*} Season still in progress
^{1} Ineligible for series points

=== ARCA Re/Max Series ===
(key) (Bold – Pole position awarded by qualifying time. Italics – Pole position earned by points standings or practice time. * – Most laps led.)

ARCA Re/Max Series results
Year	Team	No.	Make	1	2	3	4	5	6	7	8	9	10	11	12	13	14	15	16	17	18	19	20	21	22	23	ARMC	Pts	Ref
2006	Richard Childress Racing	31	Chevy	DAY	NSH	SLM	WIN	KEN	TOL	POC	MCH	KAN	KEN	BLN	POC	GTW	NSH	MCH	ISF	MIL	TOL	DSF	CHI	SLM	TAL; 17	IOW	121st	145	
2007	Richard Childress Racing	31	Chevy	DAY; 6	USA	NSH	SLM	KAN	WIN	KEN	TOL	IOW	POC	MCH	BLN	KEN	POC	NSH	ISF	MIL	GTW	DSF	CHI	SLM	TAL	TOL	107th	200	

=== CARS Late Model Stock Car Tour ===
(key) (Bold – Pole position awarded by qualifying time. Italics – Pole position earned by points standings or practice time. * – Most laps led. ** – All laps led.)

CARS Late Model Stock Car Tour results
Year	Team	No.	Make	1	2	3	4	5	6	7	8	9	10	11	12	13	14	15	16	17	CLMSCTC	Pts	Ref
2016	Nelson Motorsports	12B	Toyota	SNM	**ROU**; 1	HCY	TCM	GRE	ROU	CON	MYB	HCY	SNM								29th	35	
2017	Nelson Motorsports	12	Toyota	CON	DOM	DOM	HCY	HCY	BRI	AND	ROU	TCM	ROU	HCY	CON	SBO; 3					38th	30	
2018	Nelson Motorsports	12P	Toyota	TCM; 8	MYB	ROU	HCY	BRI	ACE	CCS	KPT	HCY; 3	WKS	ROU							20th	73	
2018	Nelson Motorsports	12	Toyota												SBO; 17						20th	73	
2019	Nelson Motorsports	12	Toyota	SNM	HCY	ROU; 16	ACE	MMS	LGY	DOM	CCS	HCY	ROU	SBO; 5							33rd	46	
2020	Nelson Motorsports	12	Toyota	SNM	ACE	HCY	HCY	DOM	FCS	LGY; 22	CCS	FLO; 2*	GRE; 19								25th	58	
2021	Nelson Motorsports	2N	Chevy	**DIL**; 5	HCY	OCS	ACE	CRW													26th	49	
2021	Nelson Motorsports	12	Chevy						LGY; 20	DOM; Wth											26th	49	
2021	Nelson Motorsports	22P	Toyota								HCY; 27	MMS	TCM	FLC	WKS	SBO					26th	49	
2023	BH Motorsports	51	Chevy	SNM	FLC	HCY	ACE	NWS	LGY	DOM	CRW	HCY	ACE	TCM	WKS	AAS	SBO	TCM; 28	CRW		88th	5	
2024	BH Motorsports	51	Chevy	SNM	HCY	AAS	OCS; 9	ACE	TCM	LGY	DOM	CRW	HCY	NWS	ACE	WCS	FLC	SBO	TCM	NWS	N/A	0	
