= Strutmasters =

- Type: Private
- Industry: Auto parts
- Founded: 1999
- Founder: Chip Lofton
- Headquarters: Roxboro, North Carolina
- Website: strutmasters.com

Strutmasters is an American automotive parts manufacturer that specializes in suspension parts. It was founded by Chip Lofton in 1999 and is headquartered in Roxboro, North Carolina. Strutmasters invented an air-to-coil suspension conversion kits.

== History ==
Chip Lofton founded Strutmasters in 1999. Lofton initially began operations for Strutmasters in a barn on his goat farm after receiving requests to convert cars to a conventional suspension after he fixed the same issue on his Lincoln Continental. Lofton went on to move operations for Strutmasters into a factory and eventually into a modern facility in Roxboro.

Strutmasters sponsored the No. 17 truck driven by Timothy Peters in NASCAR's Craftsman Truck Series from 2009 to 2012.

In 2015, Strutmasters sponsored the NASCAR Whelen Southern Modified Strutmasters.com 199 at Bowman Gray Stadium.

In 2019, Strutmasters signed on as a major associate sponsor for NHRA Top Fuel racer Doug Foley. In the same year, the company also signed on as a sponsor for professional Pro Fuel motorcycle racer Janette Thornley.

Strutmasters also became the co-primary sponsor for NHRA Top Fuel’s Stringer Performance team and its driver, Clay Millican, replacing Great Clips as the racing team's sponsor. Strutmasters also joined Nitro Funny Car driver Dave Richards as a sponsor for the NTK NHRA Carolina Nationals.

Strutmasters sponsored former NHRA Pro Stock champion Bo Butner for the 2020 season of NHRA's Mello Yello Drag Racing Series. Lofton sold Strutmasters in August 2020, remaining as a partner in the company.

A year later, he would step back from his business projects due to contracting cobalt poisoning. Strutmasters has also funded NHRA race car drivers such as Pro Modified racer Wally Stroupe, and Top Fuel racers Justin Ashley, Lex Joon, and Audrey Worm.

Strutmasters also sponsored NHRA Pro Stock motorcycle racer Scotty Pollacheck.

== Products ==
Strutmasters specializes in manufacturing air-to-non-air suspension conversion kits. Strutmasters also offers solutions for fixing failed complex air, magnetic, electronic, and hydraulic suspension systems.The company also sells parts for specific car brands and models. It also sells suspension conversion kits for motorcycles.

Strutmasters assembles its kits in-house at its Roxboro headquarters. The company also packages DIY instructions with its products and hosts video tutorials for suspension replacement on its website.
