= Regan Smith (racing driver) =

American racing driver (born 1983)

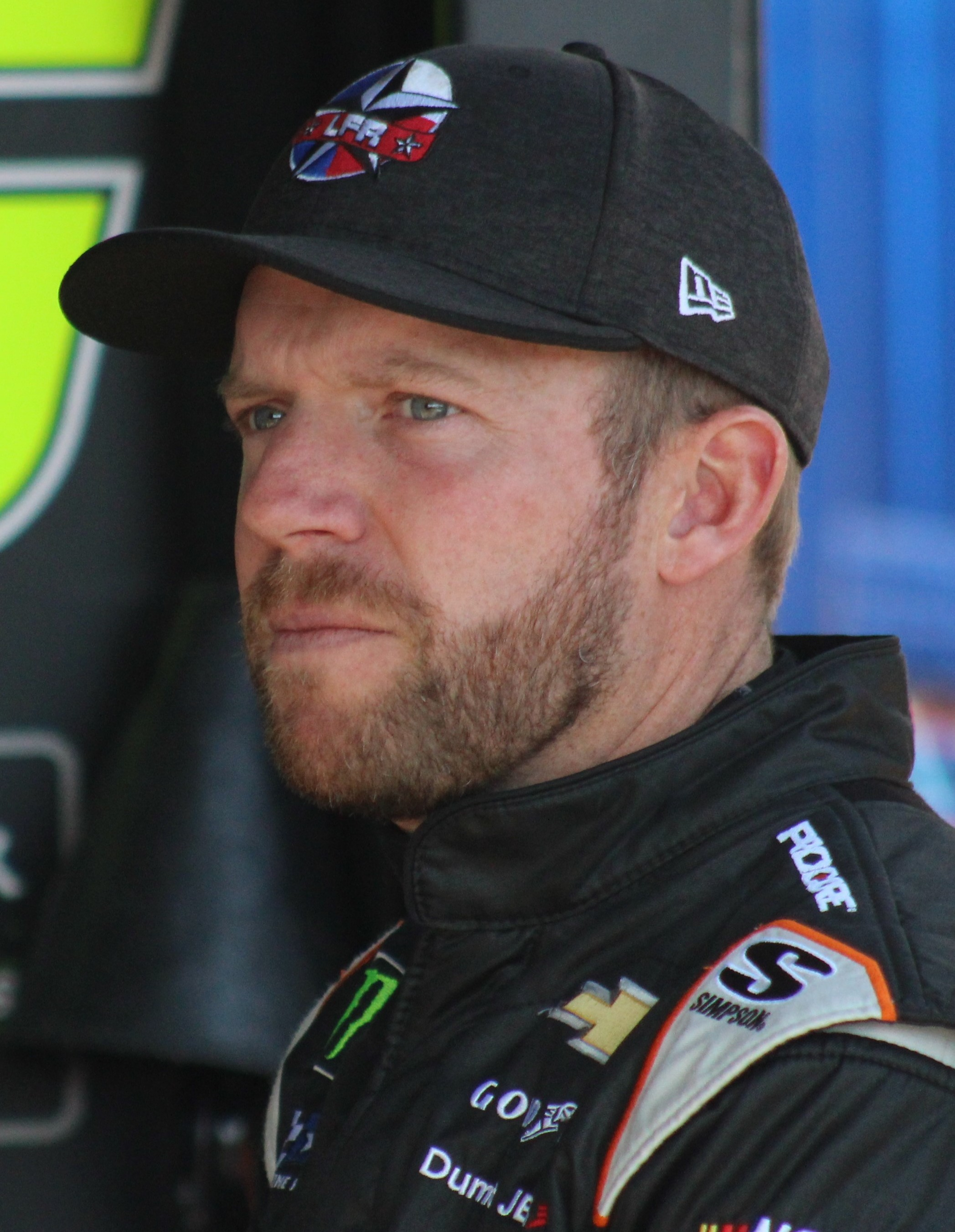
- Smith at ISM Raceway in 2018
- Born: Regan Lee Smith; September 23, 1983 (age 43); Cato, New York, U.S.
- Achievements: 2011 Southern 500 winner 1996 WKA Grand National champion 1997 WKA Manufacturer's Cup champion 1998 Canadian Grand National Karting championship 1999 Allison Legacy Series champion 2008 IWK 250 winner
- Awards: 2008 Sprint Cup Series Rookie of the Year; 2013 NASCAR Nationwide Series Most Popular Driver

NASCAR Cup Series career
- 224 races run over 12 years
- Best finish: 24th (2012)
- First race: 2007 Food City 500 (Bristol)
- Last race: 2018 Ford EcoBoost 400 (Homestead)
- First win: 2011 Showtime Southern 500 (Darlington)
| Wins | Top tens | Poles |
|---|---|---|
| 1 | 14 | 0 |

NASCAR O'Reilly Auto Parts Series career
- 208 races run over 13 years
- Best finish: 2nd (2014)
- First race: 2002 Sam's Town 250 (Memphis)
- Last race: 2019 CTECH Manufacturing 180 (Road America)
- First win: 2012 Ford EcoBoost 300 (Homestead)
- Last win: 2015 Hisense 200 (Dover)
| Wins | Top tens | Poles |
|---|---|---|
| 6 | 79 | 1 |

NASCAR FedEx Freight Truck Series career
- 38 races run over 7 years
- 2026 position: 55th
- Best finish: 18th (2017)
- First race: 2002 John Boy & Billy's Hardee's 250 (South Boston)
- Last race: 2026 Ecosave 200 (Charlotte)
| Wins | Top tens | Poles |
|---|---|---|
| 0 | 7 | 0 |

ARCA Menards Series West career
- 1 race run over 1 year
- Best finish: 74th (2007)
- First race: 2007 Blue Lizard Suncream 200 (Sonoma)
| Wins | Top tens | Poles |
|---|---|---|
| 0 | 0 | 0 |
- Statistics up to date as of November 6, 2026.

Regan (Note: Pronounced /ˈriːɡən/ REE-gən) Lee Smith (born September 23, 1983) is an American semi-retired professional stock car racing driver and a current pit reporter for NASCAR on Fox. He last competed part-time in the NASCAR Craftsman Truck Series, driving the No. 25 Ram 1500 for Kaulig Racing.

== Early career ==
Born to a racing family, Smith began his racing career at the age of four, racing go-karts and microds. Early in his career, he won numerous regional and state championships. In 1995, his family moved from Cato, New York to Mooresville, North Carolina to allow Smith to advance in his racing career. In 1998, Smith joined the World Karting Association, driving for a factory-supported team, and winning the championship that year. Smith also began competing in the Allison Legacy Series in 1998, where he would race for two seasons, winning Rookie of the Year and the championship title in 1999. In 1999, Smith made his series debut in the Hooters Pro Cup Series at USA International Speedway, where he finished last place after crashing 18 laps into the race.

Smith began driving full-time in the Hooters Pro Cup Series in 2000, finishing his first season with five top-ten finishes and a single top-five finish, which came at Myrtle Beach in May. He returned to the series in 2001, starting from the pole at Thompson, Louisville, IRP, and Chemung.

== Racing career ==
=== 2002–2004 ===
Smith began his NASCAR career in 2002, making his NASCAR Craftsman Truck Series debut at South Boston in the No. 63 Ford F-150 for MB Motorsports. He qualified 28th but had engine issues mid-race and finished 29th. In October, Smith made his NASCAR Busch Series debut at Memphis, driving in the No. 07 Chevrolet Monte Carlo for Ed Whitaker. Smith qualified 16th in his Busch debut, but would finish in 39th after a wreck. He made one last start during the 2002 season in the Craftsman Truck Series at Phoenix, again racing for MB Motorsports. Smith qualified 12th for the race, finishing in 30th place after ignition issues ended his race early.

In 2003, Smith joined Bost Motorsports in an attempt to run a full-time season for the team, starting at Rockingham. Despite a lack of sponsorship, Smith had three top twenty finishes and was second place in the Rookie of the Year standings halfway through the season. However, following the July race at Daytona, Bost and Smith parted ways, the team opting to run a rotating door of drivers for the remainder of the season. Smith returned at Pikes Peak, driving the No. 47 Chevrolet Monte Carlo for Innovative Motorsports. He qualified 29th for the race, finishing 40th after having ignition issues. To finish the season, Smith joined Mac Hill Motorsports, driving the No. 56 Chevrolet Monte Carlo at the season finale at Homestead. He finished the race in 28th after qualifying 19th. Smith finished the season 38th in points.

Smith ran a part-time schedule in 2004, running for multiple teams throughout the season. He attempted the season-opener at Daytona with Mac Hill Motorsports but failed to qualify. He made six straight races with the team. At Nazareth, Smith practiced and qualified the No. 38 Dodge Charger for Akins Motorsports driver Kasey Kahne, who was with his Winston Cup team during that time. The following race at Charlotte, Smith would fail to qualify for the race and was released by the team. His best finish for Mac Hill Motorsports came at Nashville Superspeedway, where he finished 17th. Holigan Racing hired Smith for three races. During this time, Smith appeared in a few episodes of The Reality of Speed on SpikeTV, a reality show that followed the team. The team would suspend operations mid-season. Phoenix Racing hired Smith to run the No. 1 Dodge Charger for the race at Pikes Peak, where he qualified 19th and finished in 15th. At Memphis, Smith would again practice and qualify a car for a Nextel Cup Series driver, this time doing so for Greg Biffle's No. 60 Roush Racing Ford.

Smith made a return to the Craftsman Truck Series for the season finale at Homestead, driving the No. 06 Chevrolet Silverado for MRD Motorsports. After qualifying 25th, Smith drove through the field and finished in ninth place, his first top-ten in NASCAR competition.

=== 2005–2007 ===
Smith began the 2005 season in the Craftsman Truck Series, driving the No. 19 Chevrolet for Xpress Motorsports. However, after being caught up in a wreck in the season opener at Daytona, blowing an engine at Fontana, and then failing to qualify for the race at Atlanta, Smith was let go from the team after failing to find sponsorship. Smith was hired soon after by Glynn Motorsports to drive the team's No. 65 Dodge Ram beginning at Mansfield. After moderate success in four races with the team, Smith was moved to Glynn's Busch Series team, replacing a struggling Brent Sherman in the No. 58 Dodge in an attempt to keep the car above 30th in points. Smith found some success during the season, finishing 15th at Nashville, Loudon, and Gateway and qualifying in the top-ten six times. Despite this success, Smith was released by the team before the series finale.

Smith finished the season back in the Craftsman Truck Series, returning to the No. 06 Chevrolet for MRD Motorsports for three races. During this stretch of races, Smith struggled, finishing 29th at Atlanta before wrecking out at Texas and having a mechanical issue at the season finale at Homestead.

In November 2005, Smith signed with Team Rensi Motorsports to run the 2006 Busch Series full-time in the team's No. 35 McDonald's sponsored Ford, replacing Jason Keller. He successfully ran the entire season with the team, finishing the season with one top-ten, a tenth place finish at Charlotte, ending the season 20th in points. In October 2006, Ginn Racing owner Bobby Ginn announced that Smith would begin testing with the team with the goal to move him to the Nextel Cup Series 16-race part-time for the 2007 season, sharing the No. 01 Chevrolet with Mark Martin.

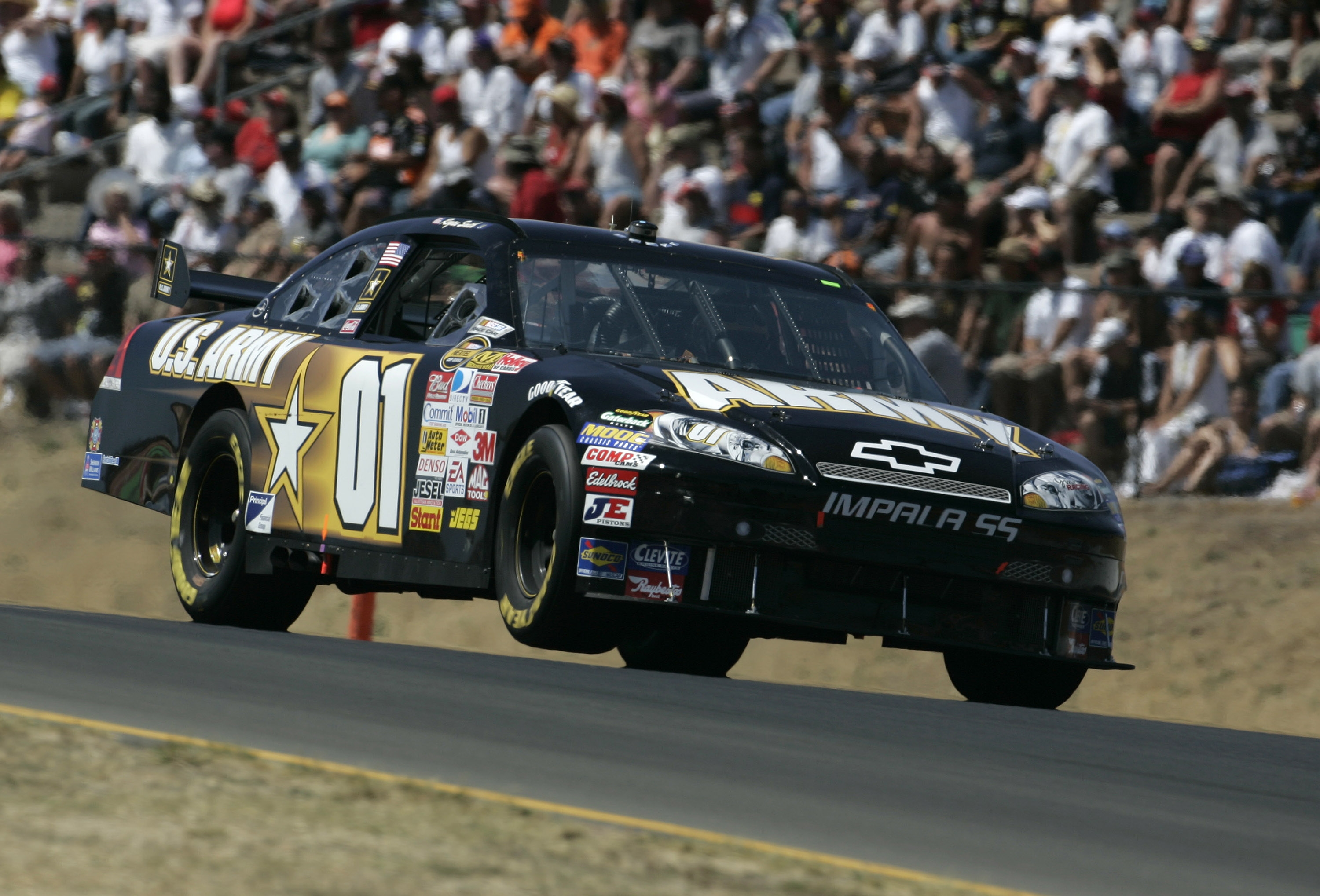
Smith racing at Sonoma in June 2007

=== 2007–2008: Ginn Racing and Dale Earnhardt Inc. ===
Smith attempted his first career Cup race at the 2007 Daytona 500, in a fourth car, numbered 39, for Ginn Racing. After qualifying 25th fastest in the field, Smith entered the Gatorade Duels 8th fastest of the drivers not locked in and failed to qualify after finishing 19th in his Duel. During this time, Smith also raced the No. 4 part-time for Ginn Racing in the Busch Series, getting his first top-ten of the season at Fontana.

Smith's Cup debut came at the Food City 500 at Bristol, which was also the debut race of the Car of Tomorrow. Smith qualified 12th for the race, and finished 25th after struggling on pit road. Smith clinched his first top-five of the season in the Busch Series race at Nashville. In July, Ginn Racing released full-time drivers Joe Nemechek and Sterling Marlin midseason and announced that the team had added the rest of the season to Smith's schedule before promoting him to full-time for the 2008 season. However, before Smith could run another race, Ginn Racing merged with Dale Earnhardt, Inc. Due to the merge, the No. 14's owner points were transferred to Paul Menard's No. 15, and the No. 14 was shut down, leaving Smith without a ride. Smith finished out the 2007 season in the Craftsman Truck Series, driving the No. 47 Chevrolet for Morgan-Dollar Motorsports

In 2008, Smith returned to DEI to drive the No. 01 full-time after Mark Martin moved over to the team's No. 8 car alongside Aric Almirola to replace a departing Dale Earnhardt Jr. Smith was eligible for Rookie of the Year after not reaching the minimum number of starts necessary in 2007. Despite it being announced that Smith was running the entire season, DEI elected to replace him at Watkins Glen and Sonoma with Road course ringer Ron Fellows. In June, Smith joined Morgan-Dollar Motorsports for the Craftsman Truck Series race at Michigan, driving the No. 46. He finished 17th in the race.

At the Talladega race in October, Smith was part of a controversial finish. On the final lap, Smith made a successful last-lap pass on race leader Tony Stewart, crossing the line first. However, after the finish, NASCAR determined that Smith drove below the yellow line onto the apron to make the pass and handed the win to Stewart. Smith was scored 18th, the final car on the lead lap. After the race, Smith claimed that the reason he went below the yellow line was because Stewart had pushed him down there.

Smith finished the season 34th in points, his best finish being 14th at Martinsville and Bristol. He finished first in the Rookie of the Year standings over Sam Hornish Jr., Patrick Carpentier, Michael McDowell, and Dario Franchitti, beating Hornish by seven points. He also became the first Rookie of the Year winner to finish their rookie season without a DNF.

=== 2009–2012: Furniture Row Racing ===
Following the 2008 season, DEI would merge with Chip Ganassi Racing and become Earnhardt Ganassi Racing. The No. 01 ride was shut down due to the merge and Smith was released by the team. Smith joined Furniture Row Racing for a part-time schedule for the 2009 season. Initially a 12-race deal, Smith attempted a total of 20 races in 2009, failing to qualify twice towards the end of the season. He returned to Furniture Row in 2010, this time to run a full-time schedule. His best finish of the season came at both Fontana and Talladega where he finished 12th place and he ended the season 28th in points.

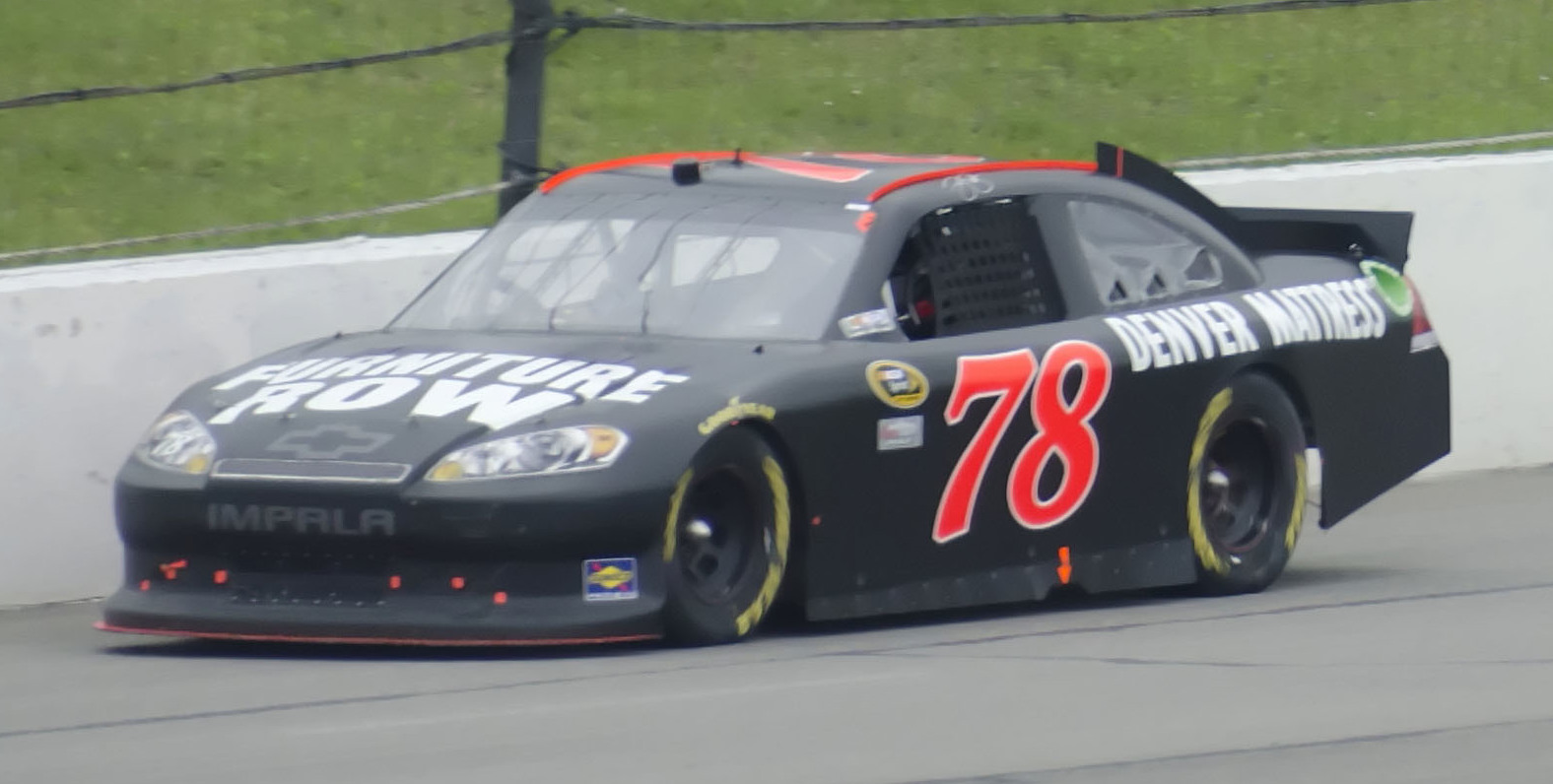
Smith's No. 78 car at Pocono in 2011

Smith started the 2011 season strong in the Daytona 500. After qualifying fifth, he was running up front less than five laps remaining in the race before getting turned by Kurt Busch and hit by Clint Bowyer and Ryan Newman. Despite the damage, Smith finished seventh place, the first top-ten in his Cup career as well as the first top-ten for Furniture Row Racing in team history. The following week at Phoenix, he qualified fifth again before being caught up in a multi-car wreck during the race.

In May, Smith won his first Cup race in the Showtime Southern 500 at Darlington, holding off Carl Edwards after staying out on old tires. Smith became the third person to win their first career Cup win at Darlington. In the Brickyard 400 at Indianapolis, Smith saved enough fuel to coast to a third place finish. Smith finished the season with five top-tens, 26th in the overall standings. This was Furniture Row Racing's first Cup Series win, and would ultimately be the only time a driver other than Martin Truex Jr. won with them.

In 2012, Smith again returned to Furniture Row. At Daytona, Smith finished second behind Matt Kenseth in their Gatorade Duel to start sixth in the Daytona 500. The week after at Phoenix, Smith would qualify well again, starting third. In an eventful race at Bristol in August, Smith had an altercation with driver Danica Patrick. In the closing laps of the race, Smith drifted up the track, turning Patrick head-on into the outside wall. After climbing from her car, Patrick approached Smith's car as he was driving past and wagged her finger at him.

On September 24, 2012, Furniture Row Racing announced that they were moving on from Smith and had signed Kurt Busch to drive the No. 78 for the rest of the 2012 season and full-time in 2013. Smith's final race with the team came at Talladega. Phoenix Racing, the team Busch left for Furniture Row, announced that Smith would finish the season out with the team. However, after Hendrick Motorsports announced that Dale Earnhardt Jr. had been diagnosed with a concussion after wrecking at Talladega, Smith was named as Earnhardt's replacement for two races.

In his two-race stint with Hendrick, Smith qualified in the middle of the pack at Charlotte, climbing all the way to the top-ten before having engine issues. The following week at Kansas, Smith qualified in 39th, but managed to finish in the top-ten, finishing seventh. Smith ran the final races of the season at Phoenix Racing.

In November, JR Motorsports announced Smith as a full-time driver for the 2013 season. Smith made his debut with JRM at the finale race at Homestead. After qualifying tenth, Smith took the lead with 22 laps left in the race and gained his first career victory in the Nationwide Series.

=== 2013–2015: JR Motorsports ===
==== 2013 ====
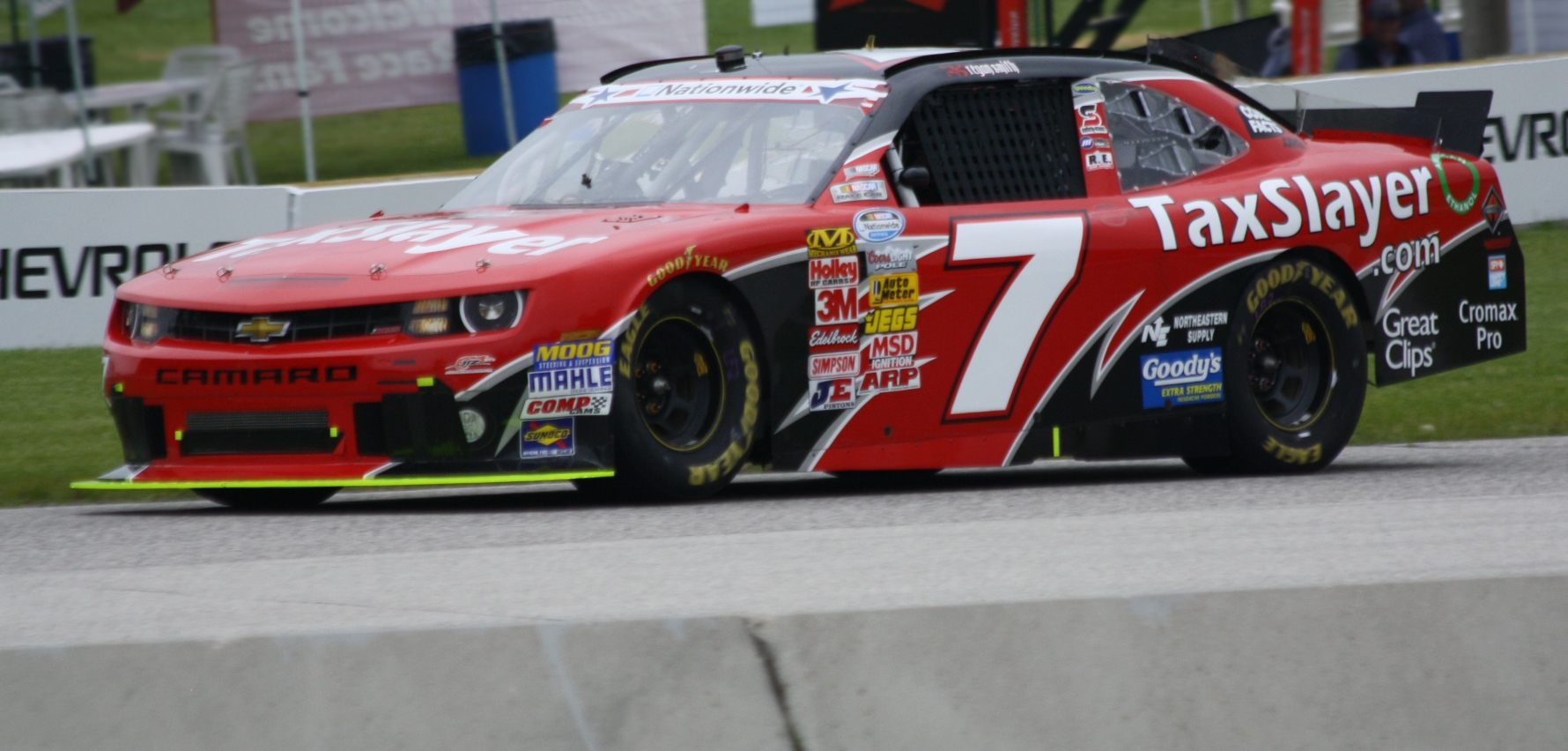
Smith's No. 7 car at Road America in 2013

In 2013, Smith moved to the No. 7, replacing Danica Patrick who moved to Cup full-time. In the season-opener at Daytona, he led 23 laps in the race and led the field to the white flag. While racing to the finish, Smith spun from the lead while attempting to block Brad Keselowski, triggering a big-one which sent Kyle Larson's car into the catchfence, injuring 28 fans. Smith returned to Cup for the Daytona 500 the following day, driving the No. 51 for Phoenix Racing. After qualifying 40th, Smith avoided multiple wrecks to finish seventh.

In the Nationwide race at Talladega, Smith found himself a part of another controversial finish at the track. While fighting for the win side-by-side with Kasey Kahne and Joey Logano, a big wreck caused NASCAR to throw the caution, effectively ending the race. Despite Kahne being ahead in the photo finish at the finish line, NASCAR handed Smith the win instead as he was leading at the time of caution. Smith raced in the Cup race the day after, getting another top-ten for Phoenix Racing after finishing sixth.

At Michigan in June, Smith scored his second victory of the season, holding off Kyle Larson after taking the lead from Parker Kligerman with 13 laps remaining. Smith's 11-race top-ten streak ended at Road America after he finished 32nd in the race.

In September, Smith stepped into the No. 48 for Hendrick Motorsports at Richmond to practice and qualify for Jimmie Johnson, who missed practice and qualifying for the birth of his second child. Smith finished his first full-time season at JR Motorsports with two wins, eight top-fives, and 19 top-tens, finishing third in points. At the NASCAR Awards Banquet, Smith was named the Most Popular Driver in the Nationwide Series.

==== 2014 ====
Smith returned to the No. 7 car in 2014, winning the season-opener at Daytona in a photo finish with Brad Keselowski. Smith finished in the top-ten in the first 13 races of the season, again breaking the streak at Road America. At the Daytona race in July, Smith was part of another photo finish, this time losing to Kasey Kahne. Smith finished the season second in points, losing the championship to teammate Chase Elliott who clinched the championship at Phoenix a week before the season finale at Homestead.

During the 2014 season, Smith solidified his role as a go-to standby driver in Cup. In May, Hendrick Motorsports named Smith as the standby driver at Charlotte for Jeff Gordon, who was experiencing back spasms before the Coca-Cola 600. Gordon went on to complete all 600 miles of the race. A few months later, Smith replaced Tony Stewart in the No. 14 Stewart-Haas Racing car for the race at Watkins Glen following Stewart's involvement in the death of Kevin Ward Jr.

==== 2015 ====
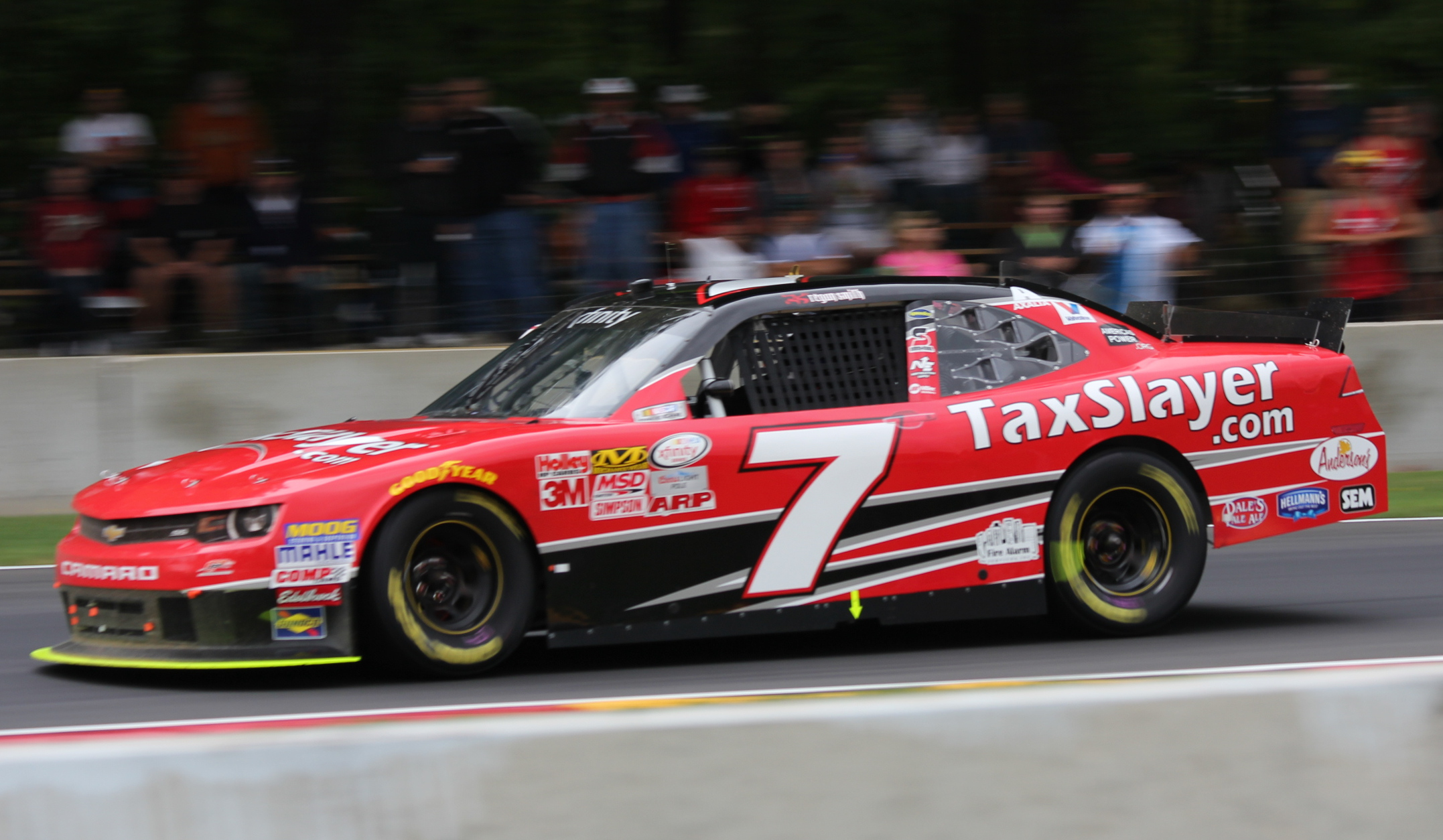
Smith's 2015 Xfinity Series car at Road America

In the Xfinity Series season-opener in 2015, Smith was riding in the top-ten with 28 laps to go in the race when he was clipped in the right rear by a spinning Daniel Suárez. The sudden change in momentum caused Smith's car to rollover once before landing on its wheels. Smith was unharmed in the wreck and was credited with a 35th place finish.

Smith ran the first three races of the Cup schedule, replacing a suspended Kurt Busch in his No. 41 car at Stewart-Haas Racing. Smith returned for a race a few weeks later, filling in for Kyle Larson, driving the No. 42 Chip Ganassi Racing car at Martinsville after Larson fainted the day before the race. This would end up being Smith's final Cup start in 2015.

In August at Watkins Glen, Smith was running up front for the first half of the race before being spun by Ty Dillon on a restart. Later in the race, Smith would spin again after contact with Brendan Gaughan, Dillon's teammate. Post-race, Smith walked over to Dillon's car on pit road where the two got into an argument and began grabbing each other, being split up by crew members. The next week at Mid-Ohio, Smith grabbed his first victory of the season, passing road-course ringer Alex Tagliani on the final lap to take the win.

In October, Smith won again, this time at Dover. A few weeks later, Smith announced that he would not return to JR Motorsports to race full-time in the Cup Series in 2016. On October 28, Justin Allgaier was named as his replacement.

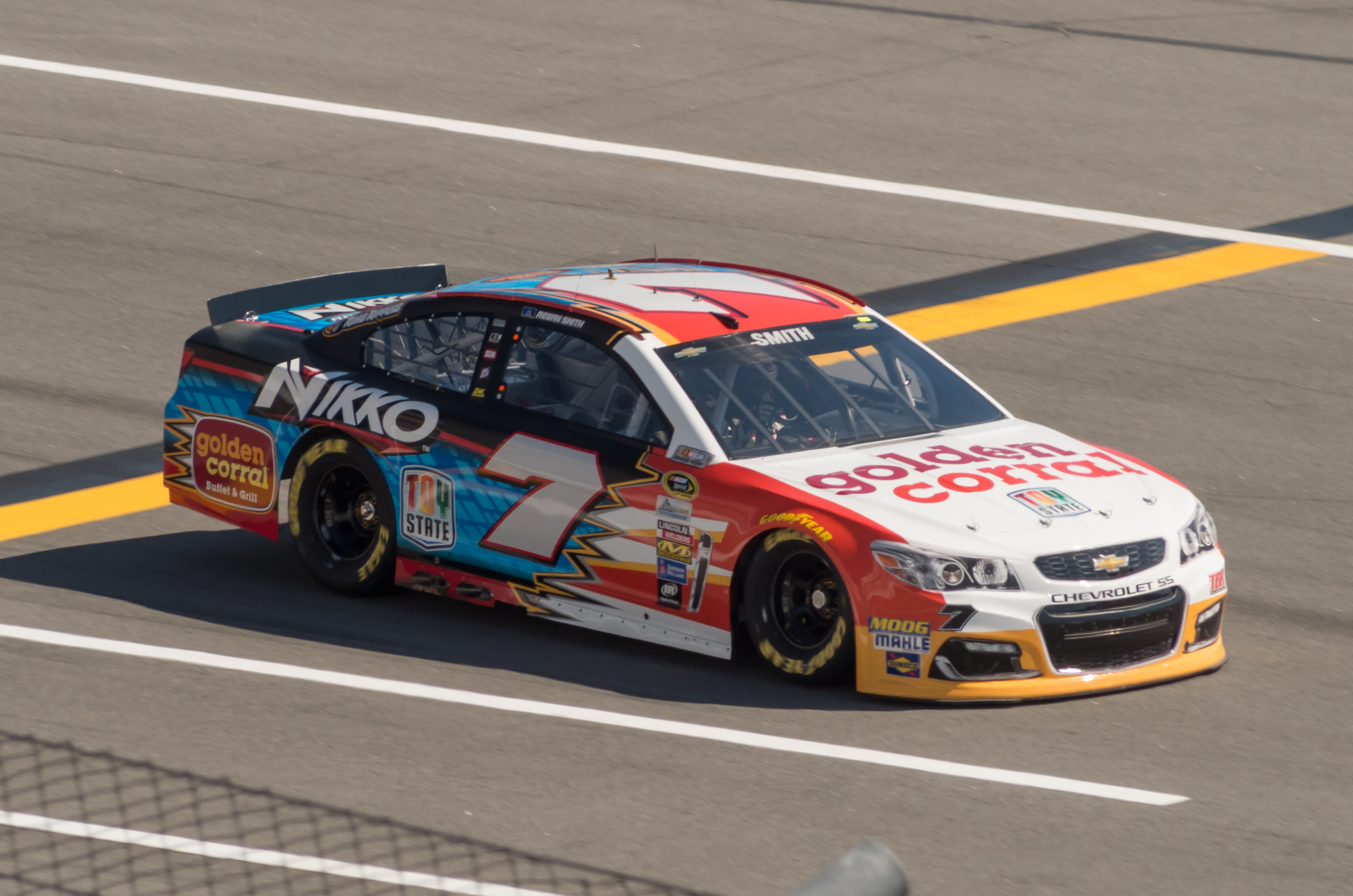
Smith's 2016 Cup Series car at Daytona

=== 2016: Tommy Baldwin Racing ===
In 2016, Smith returned full-time in Cup, driving the No. 7 for Tommy Baldwin Racing, replacing Alex Bowman. He started the season strong with an eighth place finish in the Daytona 500. He wouldn't score another top-ten until the Pocono race in August, where he finished third. Smith missed the race at Chicagoland to attend the birth of his daughter and was replaced by Ty Dillon for the race. On November 17, Tommy Baldwin Racing announced that the team would not be competing full-time after the 2016 season, leaving Smith without a ride.

=== 2017–2019: Part-time ===
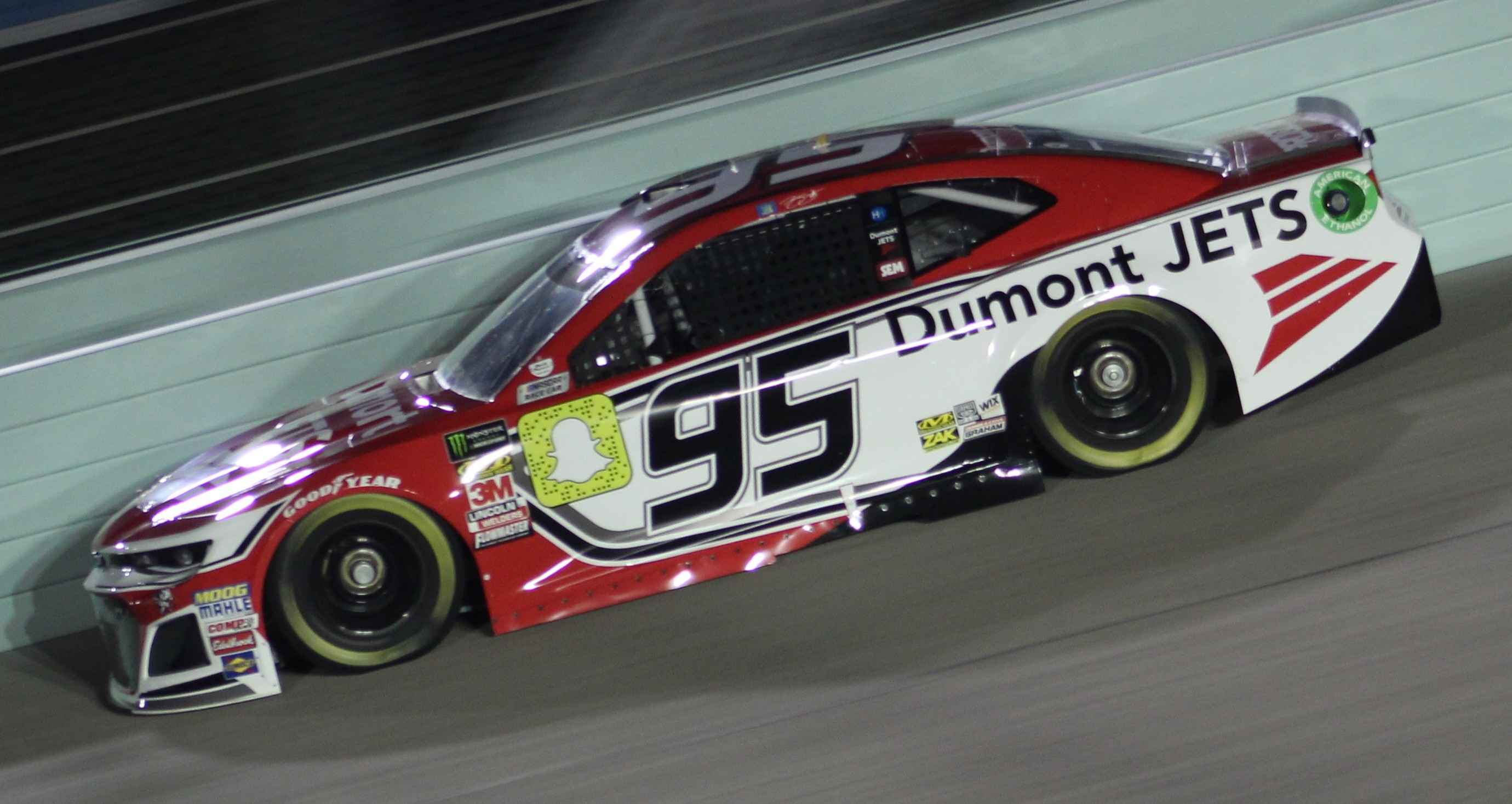
Smith racing at Homestead in 2018

On February 8, 2017, Smith joined RBR Enterprises in the Truck Series, running 13 races for the team. In May, Smith returned to Cup to drive the No. 43 car for Richard Petty Motorsports, filling in for an injured Aric Almirola. Smith ran the Monster Energy Open, the qualifying event for the Monster Energy NASCAR All-Star Race, the Coca-Cola 600 at Charlotte, and a race at Dover. Following the race at Dover, Bubba Wallace became the driver of the No. 43 car until Almirola returned from injury.

In August, Smith joined Joe Gibbs Racing's Xfinity team on a one-race deal at Mid-Ohio.

During the 2018 season, Kasey Kahne announced he was stepping away from racing for the rest of the season due to health reasons. On September 6, 2018, Leavine Family Racing named Smith as Kahne's replacement beginning at Indianapolis. Smith finished on track in all 11 races and finished in the top-ten at Talladega.

In 2019, Smith returned to JR Motorsports in the Xfinity Series for the races at Mid-Ohio and Road America, driving the No. 8 car.

== Broadcasting career ==
In June 2017, Smith became a color commentator for Fox NASCAR's broadcast of the Xfinity Series race at Iowa Speedway. On November 29, 2017, Fox NASCAR announced Smith would become a pit reporter for Cup and Xfinity races in 2018. Smith said that working the 2018 season on television helped him to know the entire NASCAR community better because he was not bound by team alliances anymore and could talk to anyone in the garage.

== Personal life ==
Smith is an avid fan of the Carolina Hurricanes and the Denver Broncos.

Smith married Megan Mayhew in 2011, and the couple has two children, a son named Rhett born February 25, 2015, and a daughter named Eliza born September 18, 2016.

== Motorsports career results ==
=== NASCAR ===
(key) (Bold – Pole position awarded by qualifying time. Italics – Pole position earned by points standings or practice time. * – Most laps led.)

==== Monster Energy Cup Series ====
Monster Energy NASCAR Cup Series results
| Year | Team | No. | Make | 1 | 2 | 3 | 4 | 5 | 6 | 7 | 8 | 9 | 10 | 11 | 12 | 13 | 14 | 15 | 16 | 17 | 18 | 19 | 20 | 21 | 22 | 23 | 24 | 25 | 26 | 27 | 28 | 29 | 30 | 31 | 32 | 33 | 34 | 35 | 36 | MENCC | Pts | Ref |
|---|---|---|---|---|---|---|---|---|---|---|---|---|---|---|---|---|---|---|---|---|---|---|---|---|---|---|---|---|---|---|---|---|---|---|---|---|---|---|---|---|---|---|
| 2007 | Ginn Racing | 39 | Chevy | DAY; DNQ | CAL | LVS | ATL | | | | | | | | | | | | | | | | | | | | | | | | | | | | | | | | | 50th | 516 | |
| 2007 | Ginn Racing | 01 | Chevy | | | | | BRI; 25 | MAR; 26 | TEX | PHO | TAL; 24 | RCH | DAR | CLT | DOV | POC | MCH | SON; 30 | NHA; 32 | DAY | CHI | IND | POC | | | | | | | | | | | | | | | | 50th | 516 | |
| 2007 | Dale Earnhardt, Inc. | 01 | Chevy | | | | | | | | | | | | | | | | | | | | | | GLN; 37 | MCH | BRI | CAL | RCH | NHA; 36 | DOV | KAN | TAL | CLT | MAR | ATL | TEX | PHO | HOM | 50th | 516 | |
| 2008 | Dale Earnhardt, Inc. | 01 | Chevy | DAY; 37 | CAL; 31 | LVS; 34 | ATL; 38 | BRI; 26 | MAR; 14 | TEX; 35 | PHO; 35 | TAL; 21 | RCH; 21 | DAR; 29 | CLT; 19 | DOV; 21 | POC; 28 | MCH; 32 | SON | NHA; 27 | DAY; 24 | CHI; 34 | IND; 31 | POC; 25 | GLN | MCH; 29 | BRI; 14 | CAL; 26 | RCH; 23 | NHA; 23 | DOV; 37 | KAN; 32 | TAL; 18 | CLT; 23 | MAR; 42 | ATL; 30 | TEX; 34 | PHO; 23 | HOM; 34 | 34th | 2672 | |
| 2009 | Furniture Row Racing | 78 | Chevy | DAY; 21 | CAL | LVS; 19 | ATL | BRI | MAR | TEX; 31 | PHO; 28 | TAL; 15 | RCH | DAR; 21 | CLT | DOV; 22 | POC; 33 | MCH | SON | NHA; 27 | DAY; 12 | CHI | IND; 39 | POC | GLN | MCH | BRI; 27 | ATL; DNQ | RCH; 40 | NHA | DOV; 32 | KAN | CAL; 28 | CLT | MAR | TAL; 39 | TEX; 32 | PHO; DNQ | HOM; 32 | 39th | 1440 | |
| 2010 | Furniture Row Racing | 78 | Chevy | DAY; 39 | CAL; 19 | LVS; 21 | ATL; 19 | BRI; 36 | MAR; 32 | PHO; 26 | TEX; 21 | TAL; 38 | RCH; 30 | DAR; 17 | DOV; 24 | CLT; 19 | POC; 18 | MCH; 23 | SON; 38 | NHA; 33 | DAY; 33 | CHI; 20 | IND; 33 | POC; 21 | GLN; 34 | MCH; 21 | BRI; 30 | ATL; 17 | RCH; 25 | NHA; 19 | DOV; 26 | KAN; 26 | CAL; 12 | CLT; 13 | MAR; 31 | TAL; 12 | TEX; 22 | PHO; 23 | HOM; 17 | 28th | 3229 | |
| 2011 | Furniture Row Racing | 78 | Chevy | DAY; 7 | PHO; 34 | LVS; 39 | BRI; 22 | CAL; 27 | MAR; 31 | TEX; 37 | TAL; 15 | RCH; 17 | DAR; 1 | DOV; 34 | CLT; 8 | KAN; 24 | POC; 15 | MCH; 33 | SON; 16 | DAY; 24 | KEN; 17 | NHA; 33 | IND; 3 | POC; 21 | GLN; 23 | MCH; 13 | BRI; 18 | ATL; 33 | RCH; 18 | CHI; 17 | NHA; 10 | DOV; 17 | KAN; 24 | CLT; 25 | TAL; 30 | MAR; 13 | TEX; 23 | PHO; 38 | HOM; 13 | 26th | 820 | |
| 2012 | Furniture Row Racing | 78 | Chevy | DAY; 24 | PHO; 20 | LVS; 15 | BRI; 24 | CAL; 20 | MAR; 16 | TEX; 23 | KAN; 24 | RCH; 27 | TAL; 40 | DAR; 14 | CLT; 17 | DOV; 27 | POC; 16 | MCH; 28 | SON; 32 | KEN; 33 | DAY; 34 | NHA; 26 | IND; 18 | POC; 9 | GLN; 9 | MCH; 29 | BRI; 16 | ATL; 14 | RCH; 24 | CHI; 34 | NHA; 16 | DOV; 17 | TAL; 5 | | | | | | | 24th | 747 | |
| 2012 | Hendrick Motorsports | 88 | Chevy | | | | | | | | | | | | | | | | | | | | | | | | | | | | | | | CLT; 38 | KAN; 7 | MAR | TEX | | | 24th | 747 | |
| 2012 | Phoenix Racing | 51 | Chevy | | | | | | | | | | | | | | | | | | | | | | | | | | | | | | | | | | | PHO; 24 | HOM; 30 | 24th | 747 | |
| 2013 | Phoenix Racing | 51 | Chevy | DAY; 7 | PHO | LVS | BRI | CAL | MAR; 22 | TEX | KAN; 22 | RCH | TAL; 6 | DAR; 24 | CLT; 17 | DOV | POC | MCH | SON | KEN | DAY | NHA | IND | POC | GLN | MCH | BRI | ATL | | | | | | | | | | | | 53rd | 0^{1} | |
| 2013 | Hendrick Motorsports | 48 | Chevy | | | | | | | | | | | | | | | | | | | | | | | | | | RCH; QL^{†} | CHI | NHA | DOV | KAN | CLT | TAL | MAR | TEX | PHO | HOM | 53rd | 0^{1} | |
| 2014 | Stewart–Haas Racing | 14 | Chevy | DAY | PHO | LVS | BRI | CAL | MAR | TEX | DAR | RCH | TAL | KAN | CLT | DOV | POC | MCH | SON | KEN | DAY | NHA | IND | POC | GLN; 37 | MCH | BRI | ATL | RCH | CHI | NHA | DOV | KAN | CLT | TAL | MAR | TEX | PHO | HOM | 71st | 0^{1} | |
| 2015 | Stewart–Haas Racing | 41 | Chevy | DAY; 16 | ATL; 17 | LVS; 16 | PHO | CAL | | | | | | | | | | | | | | | | | | | | | | | | | | | | | | | | 58th | 0^{1} | |
| 2015 | Chip Ganassi Racing | 42 | Chevy | | | | | | MAR; 16 | TEX | BRI | RCH | TAL | KAN | CLT | DOV | POC | MCH | SON | DAY | KEN | NHA | IND | POC | GLN | MCH | BRI | DAR | RCH | CHI | NHA | DOV | CLT | KAN | TAL | MAR | TEX | PHO | HOM | 58th | 0^{1} | |
| 2016 | Tommy Baldwin Racing | 7 | Chevy | DAY; 8 | ATL; 34 | LVS; 25 | PHO; 28 | CAL; 23 | MAR; 34 | TEX; 31 | BRI; 37 | RCH; 32 | TAL; 32 | KAN; 23 | DOV; 39 | CLT; 28 | POC; 22 | MCH; 35 | SON; 28 | DAY; 38 | KEN; 34 | NHA; 32 | IND; 26 | POC; 3 | GLN; 35 | BRI; 26 | MCH; 26 | DAR; 20 | RCH; 29 | CHI; QL^{‡} | NHA; 34 | DOV; 31 | CLT; 21 | KAN; 29 | TAL; 25 | MAR; 30 | TEX; 26 | PHO; 27 | HOM; 38 | 34th | 452 | |
| 2017 | Richard Petty Motorsports | 43 | Ford | DAY | ATL | LVS | PHO | CAL | MAR | TEX | BRI | RCH | TAL | KAN | CLT; 22 | DOV; 34 | POC | MCH | SON | DAY | KEN | NHA | IND | POC | GLN | MCH | BRI | DAR | RCH | CHI | NHA | DOV | CLT | TAL | KAN | MAR | TEX | PHO | HOM | 56th | 0^{1} | |
| 2018 | Leavine Family Racing | 95 | Chevy | DAY | ATL | LVS | PHO | CAL | MAR | TEX | BRI | RCH | TAL | DOV | KAN | CLT | POC | MCH | SON | CHI | DAY | KEN | NHA | POC | GLN | MCH | BRI | DAR | IND; 20 | LVS; 12 | RCH; 31 | CLT; 15 | DOV; 21 | TAL; 10 | KAN; 28 | MAR; 28 | TEX; 27 | PHO; 23 | HOM; 39 | 33rd | 157 | |
^{†} – Qualified for Jimmie Johnson. · ^{‡} – Replaced by Ty Dillon.

===== Daytona 500 =====
| Year | Team | Manufacturer | Start | Finish |
|---|---|---|---|---|
| 2007 | Ginn Racing | Chevrolet | DNQ | |
| 2008 | Dale Earnhardt, Inc. | Chevrolet | 29 | 37 |
| 2009 | Furniture Row Racing | Chevrolet | 42 | 21 |
| 2010 | Furniture Row Racing | Chevrolet | 11 | 39 |
| 2011 | Furniture Row Racing | Chevrolet | 5 | 7 |
| 2012 | Furniture Row Racing | Chevrolet | 6 | 24 |
| 2013 | Phoenix Racing | Chevrolet | 40 | 7 |
| 2015 | Stewart–Haas Racing | Chevrolet | 24 | 16 |
| 2016 | Tommy Baldwin Racing | Chevrolet | 27 | 8 |

==== Xfinity Series ====
NASCAR Xfinity Series results
| Year | Team | No. | Make | 1 | 2 | 3 | 4 | 5 | 6 | 7 | 8 | 9 | 10 | 11 | 12 | 13 | 14 | 15 | 16 | 17 | 18 | 19 | 20 | 21 | 22 | 23 | 24 | 25 | 26 | 27 | 28 | 29 | 30 | 31 | 32 | 33 | 34 | 35 | NXSC | Pts | Ref |
|---|---|---|---|---|---|---|---|---|---|---|---|---|---|---|---|---|---|---|---|---|---|---|---|---|---|---|---|---|---|---|---|---|---|---|---|---|---|---|---|---|---|
| 2002 | Wellrich Motorsports | 07 | Chevy | DAY | CAR | LVS | DAR | BRI | TEX | NSH | TAL | CAL | RCH | NHA | NZH | CLT | DOV | NSH | KEN | MLW | DAY | CHI | GTW | PPR | IRP | MCH | BRI | DAR | RCH | DOV | KAN | CLT | MEM; 39 | ATL | CAR | PHO | HOM | | 118th | 46 | |
| 2003 | Bost Motorsports | 22 | Chevy | DAY | CAR; 31 | LVS; 41 | DAR; 19 | BRI; 38 | TEX; 15 | TAL | NSH; 33 | CAL; 36 | RCH; 25 | GTW; 19 | NZH; 22 | CLT; 31 | DOV; 16 | NSH; 29 | KEN; 32 | MLW; 37 | DAY; 34 | CHI | NHA | | | | | | | | | | | | | | | | 38th | 1313 | |
| 2003 | Innovative Motorsports | 47 | Chevy | | | | | | | | | | | | | | | | | | | | | PPR; 40 | IRP | MCH | BRI | DAR | RCH | DOV | KAN | CLT | MEM | ATL | PHO | CAR | | | 38th | 1313 | |
| 2003 | Mac Hill Motorsports | 56 | Chevy | | | | | | | | | | | | | | | | | | | | | | | | | | | | | | | | | | HOM; 28 | | 38th | 1313 | |
| 2004 | Mac Hill Motorsports | 56 | Chevy | DAY; DNQ | CAR; 39 | LVS | DAR; 30 | BRI; 21 | TEX | NSH; 17 | TAL | CAL | GTW; 19 | RCH; 40 | | CLT; DNQ | DOV | | | | | | | | | | | | | | | | | | | | | | 45th | 802 | |
| 2004 | Akins Motorsports | 38 | Ford | | | | | | | | | | | | NZH; QL^{†} | | | | | | | | | | | | | | | | | | | | | | | | 45th | 802 | |
| 2004 | Holigan Racing | 50 | Chevy | | | | | | | | | | | | | | | NSH; 37 | KEN; 32 | MLW | DAY | CHI; 26 | NHA | | | | | | | | | | | | | | | | 45th | 802 | |
| 2004 | Phoenix Racing | 1 | Dodge | | | | | | | | | | | | | | | | | | | | | PPR; 15 | IRP | MCH | BRI | CAL | RCH | DOV | KAN | CLT | | | | | | | 45th | 802 | |
| 2004 | Roush Racing | 60 | Ford | | | | | | | | | | | | | | | | | | | | | | | | | | | | | | MEM; QL^{‡} | ATL | PHO | DAR | HOM | | 45th | 802 | |
| 2005 | Akins Motorsports | 58 | Dodge | DAY | CAL | MXC | LVS | ATL | NSH | BRI | TEX | PHO | TAL | DAR | RCH | CLT | DOV; 20 | NSH; 15 | KEN; 41 | MLW; 29 | DAY; 19 | | | | | | | | | | | | | | | | | | 33rd | 1693 | |
| 2005 | Glynn Motorsports | 58 | Dodge | | | | | | | | | | | | | | | | | | | CHI; 40 | NHA; 15 | PPR; 21 | GTW; 15 | IRP; 35 | GLN; 19 | MCH; 20 | BRI; 32 | CAL; 19 | RCH; 36 | DOV; 21 | KAN; 40 | CLT; 28 | MEM; 23 | TEX; 33 | PHO; 24 | HOM | 33rd | 1693 | |
| 2006 | Team Rensi Motorsports | 35 | Ford | DAY; 26 | CAL; 28 | MXC; 25 | LVS; 22 | ATL; 21 | BRI; 38 | TEX; 34 | NSH; 13 | PHO; 27 | TAL; 37 | RCH; 21 | DAR; 19 | CLT; 10 | DOV; 39 | NSH; 35 | KEN; 16 | MLW; 22 | DAY; 15 | CHI; 28 | NHA; 35 | MAR; 14 | GTW; 23 | IRP; 11 | GLN; 23 | MCH; 31 | BRI; 19 | CAL; 28 | RCH; 26 | DOV; 17 | KAN; 19 | CLT; 37 | MEM; 21 | TEX; 20 | PHO; 19 | HOM; 31 | 20th | 3136 | |
| 2007 | Ginn Racing | 4 | Chevy | DAY; 26 | CAL; 9 | MXC; 26 | LVS; 33 | ATL; 23 | BRI; 36 | NSH; 5 | TEX; 34 | PHO; 8 | TAL; 23 | RCH; 15 | DAR; 12 | CLT; 5 | DOV; 26 | NSH; 5 | **KEN**; 19 | MLW | NHA | DAY; 29 | CHI | GTW | IRP | CGV | GLN | MCH | BRI | CAL | RCH | DOV | KAN | CLT | MEM | TEX | PHO | HOM | 31st | 1820 | |
| 2012 | JR Motorsports | 5 | Chevy | DAY | PHO | LVS | BRI | CAL | TEX | RCH | TAL | DAR | IOW | CLT | DOV | MCH | ROA | KEN | DAY | NHA | CHI | IND | IOW | GLN | CGV | BRI | ATL | RCH | CHI | KEN | DOV | CLT | KAN | TEX | PHO | HOM; 1 | | | 107th | 0^{1} | |
| 2013 | JR Motorsports | 7 | Chevy | DAY; 14* | PHO; 11 | LVS; 7 | BRI; 6 | CAL; 3 | TEX; 7 | RCH; 5 | TAL; 1 | DAR; 7 | CLT; 10 | DOV; 9 | IOW; 7 | MCH; 1 | ROA; 32 | KEN; 30 | DAY; 8 | NHA; 8 | CHI; 13 | IND; 19 | IOW; 11 | GLN; 4 | MOH; 15 | BRI; 21 | ATL; 9 | RCH; 3 | CHI; 13 | KEN; 12 | DOV; 15 | KAN; 3* | CLT; 19 | TEX; 6 | PHO; 4 | HOM; 29 | | | 3rd | 1108 | |
| 2014 | JR Motorsports | 7 | Chevy | DAY; 1 | PHO; 8 | LVS; 10 | BRI; 10 | CAL; 10 | TEX; 7 | DAR; 8 | RCH; 8 | TAL; 3 | IOW; 3 | CLT; 7 | DOV; 10 | MCH; 7 | ROA; 13 | KEN; 28 | DAY; 2* | NHA; 10 | CHI; 16 | IND; 10 | IOW; 6 | GLN; 17 | MOH; 2 | BRI; 5 | ATL; 6 | RCH; 6 | CHI; 8 | KEN; 5 | DOV; 8 | KAN; 22 | CLT; 11 | TEX; 11 | PHO; 10 | HOM; 6 | | | 2nd | 1171 | |
| 2015 | JR Motorsports | 7 | Chevy | DAY; 35 | ATL; 9 | LVS; 3 | PHO; 9 | CAL; 9 | TEX; 4 | BRI; 30 | RCH; 3 | TAL; 9 | IOW; 11 | CLT; 4 | DOV; 3 | MCH; 11 | CHI; 13 | DAY; 17 | KEN; 10 | NHA; 7 | IND; 8 | IOW; 2 | GLN; 20 | MOH; 1 | BRI; 9 | ROA; 8 | DAR; 9 | RCH; 6 | CHI; 9 | KEN; 3 | DOV; 1 | CLT; 5 | KAN; 5 | TEX; 9 | PHO; 6 | HOM; 9 | | | 4th | 1168 | |
| 2016 | JR Motorsports | 88 | Chevy | DAY | ATL | LVS | PHO | CAL | TEX | BRI | RCH | TAL | DOV | CLT | POC | MCH | IOW | DAY | KEN | NHA | IND | IOW | GLN | MOH | BRI; 11 | ROA | DAR | RCH | CHI | KEN | | | KAN; 6 | TEX | PHO | HOM | | | 103rd | 0^{1} | |
| 2016 | Richard Childress Racing | 2 | Chevy | | | | | | | | | | | | | | | | | | | | | | | | | | | | DOV; 13 | CLT | | | | | | | 103rd | 0^{1} | |
| 2017 | Joe Gibbs Racing | 18 | Toyota | DAY | ATL | LVS | PHO | CAL | TEX | BRI | RCH | TAL | CLT | DOV | POC | MCH | IOW | DAY | KEN | NHA | IND | IOW | GLN | MOH; 28 | BRI | ROA | DAR | RCH | CHI | KEN | DOV | CLT | KAN | TEX | PHO | HOM | | | 108th | 0^{1} | |
| 2019 | JR Motorsports | 8 | Chevy | DAY | ATL | LVS | PHO | CAL | TEX | BRI | RCH | TAL | DOV | CLT | POC | MCH | IOW | CHI | DAY | KEN | NHA | IOW | GLN | MOH; 21 | BRI | ROA; 13 | DAR | IND | LVS | RCH | CLT | DOV | KAN | TEX | PHO | HOM | | | 49th | 48 | |
^{†} – Qualified for Kasey Kahne. ^{‡} – Qualified for Greg Biffle

==== Craftsman Truck Series ====
NASCAR Craftsman Truck Series results
| Year | Team | No. | Make | 1 | 2 | 3 | 4 | 5 | 6 | 7 | 8 | 9 | 10 | 11 | 12 | 13 | 14 | 15 | 16 | 17 | 18 | 19 | 20 | 21 | 22 | 23 | 24 | 25 | NCTC | Pts | Ref |
|---|---|---|---|---|---|---|---|---|---|---|---|---|---|---|---|---|---|---|---|---|---|---|---|---|---|---|---|---|---|---|---|
| 2002 | MB Motorsports | 63 | Ford | DAY | DAR | MAR | GTW | PPR | DOV | TEX | MEM | MLW | KAN | KEN | NHA | MCH | IRP | NSH | RCH | TEX | SBO; 29 | LVS | CAL | PHO; 30 | HOM | | | | 76th | 642 | |
| 2004 | MRD Motorsports | 06 | Chevy | DAY | ATL | MAR | MFD | CLT | DOV | TEX | MEM | MLW | KAN | KEN | GTW | MCH | IRP | NSH | BRI | RCH | NHA | LVS | CAL | TEX | MAR | PHO | DAR | HOM; 9 | 78th | 138 | |
| 2005 | Xpress Motorsports | 19 | Chevy | DAY; 33 | CAL; 32 | ATL; DNQ | MAR | | | | | | | | | | | | | | | | | | | | | | 38th | 640 | |
| 2005 | Billy Ballew Motorsports | 15 | Chevy | | | | | GTW; QL^{†} | | | | | | | | | | | | | | | | | | | | | 38th | 640 | |
| 2005 | Glynn Motorsports | 65 | Dodge | | | | | | MFD; 22 | CLT; 35 | DOV; 22 | TEX | MCH | MLW; 20 | KAN | KEN | MEM | IRP | NSH | BRI | RCH | NHA | LVS | MAR | | | | | 38th | 640 | |
| 2005 | MRD Motorsports | 06 | Chevy | | | | | | | | | | | | | | | | | | | | | | ATL; 29 | TEX; 33 | PHO | HOM; 32 | 38th | 640 | |
| 2007 | Morgan-Dollar Motorsports | 47 | Chevy | DAY | CAL | ATL | MAR | KAN | CLT | MFD | DOV | TEX | MCH | MLW | MEM | KEN | IRP; 8 | NSH | BRI; 14 | GTW; 5 | NHA | LVS; 12 | TAL; 9 | MAR; 36 | ATL; 18 | TEX; 30 | PHO; 34 | HOM; 9 | 32nd | 1119 | |
| 2008 | Morgan-Dollar Motorsports | 46 | Chevy | DAY | CAL | ATL | MAR | KAN | CLT | MFD | DOV | TEX | MCH; 17 | MLW | MEM | KEN | IRP | NSH | BRI | GTW | NHA | LVS | TAL | MAR | ATL | TEX | PHO | HOM | 79th | 112 | |
| 2017 | RBR Enterprises | 92 | Ford | DAY; 6 | ATL; 12 | MAR; 12 | KAN; 12 | CLT; 29 | DOV; 7 | TEX | GTW | IOW | KEN; 14 | ELD | POC | MCH | BRI; 14 | MSP | CHI; 12 | NHA | LVS | TAL; 27 | MAR; 14 | TEX; 13 | PHO | HOM; 11 | | | 18th | 300 | |
| 2026 | Kaulig Racing | 25 | Ram | DAY | ATL | STP | DAR | CAR | BRI | TEX | GLN | DOV | CLT | NSH | MCH | COR | LRP | NWS | IRP | RCH | NHA | BRI; 23 | KAN | CLT; 17 | PHO | TAL | MAR | HOM | 55th | 34 | |
^{†} – Qualified for Shane Hmiel

^{*} Season still in progress
^{1} Ineligible for series points

==== West Series ====
NASCAR West Series results
| Year | Team | No. | Make | 1 | 2 | 3 | 4 | 5 | 6 | 7 | 8 | 9 | 10 | 11 | 12 | 13 | NWSC | Pts | Ref |
|---|---|---|---|---|---|---|---|---|---|---|---|---|---|---|---|---|---|---|---|
| 2007 | Ginn Racing | 4 | Chevy | CTS | PHO | AMP | ELK | IOW | CNS | SON; 33 | DCS | IRW | MMP | EVG | CSR | AMP | 74th | 64 | |

== Notes ==
Achievements
| Preceded by Denny Hamlin | Bojangles' Southern 500 winner 2011 | Succeeded by Jimmie Johnson |
Awards
| Preceded by Juan Pablo Montoya | NASCAR Sprint Cup Series Rookie of the Year; 2008 | Succeeded by Joey Logano |
| Preceded by Danica Patrick | NASCAR Nationwide Series Most Popular Driver; 2013 | Succeeded by Chase Elliott |
