= The Reality of Speed =

US television program

The Reality of Speed is an unscripted television series that ran on SpikeTV and Speed Channel from 2004 to 2006. The show was produced in Dallas, TX.

== Seasonal overview ==
=== Season 1 ===
Season 1 consisted of 48 episodes that aired in 2004 on SpikeTV. The episodes covered the behind the scenes story of Holigan Racing's Team Radio Shack in the AMA Supercross/ Motocross series and Team Enzyte in the NASCAR Busch Series. Team Members included; David Starr, Regan Smith, Randall Speir, Steve Mertens, John Schwartz, Craig Jones, Rob Van Zeeland, Cole Siebler, Josh Summey, Michael Blose, Chris Whitcraft and Matthew Laloz.

=== Season 2 ===
Season 2 consisted of 13 episodes that aired in 2005 on Speed Channel. In addition to the network change, the NASCAR team coverage was dropped. The episodes covered Holigan Racing's Team Samsung/Sprint in the AMA Supercross series. Team members included; Michael Holigan (Owner), Lucky Nichols (Team Manager), Troy Adams (Rider), Josh Summey (Rider), Josh Woods (Rider), Michael Blose (Rider), Billy Bell (Mechanic), Matt Fleming (Mechanic), Jeremy Nichols (Mechanic), Keith Burns (Mechanic), Gary Semics (Trainer) and James Sulivan (Marketing).

=== Season 3 ===
Season 3 consisted of 13 episodes that aired in 2006 on Speed Channel. The episodes covered Holigan Racing's Team BooKoo in the AMA Supercross series. Team members included; Michael Holigan (Owner), David Vuillemin (Rider), Justin Keeney (Rider), Steve Boniface (Rider), Broc Sellards (Rider), Josh Demuth (Rider), Billy Bell (Mechanic), Matt Fleming (Mechanic), Vincent Berini (Mechanic) and James Sullivan (Marketing). Guest appearances included Leticia Cline and Erica Vuillemin.
