= 2018 AAA 400 Drive for Autism =

Race details
- Race 11 of 36 in the 2018 Monster Energy NASCAR Cup Series
- Date: May 6, 2018
- Location: Dover International Speedway in Dover, Delaware
- Course: Permanent racing facility
- Course length: 1 miles (1.6 km)
- Distance: 400 laps, 400 mi (640 km)
- Average speed: 115.044 miles per hour (185.145 km/h)

Pole position
Driver	Kyle Larson	Chip Ganassi Racing
- Time: 22.770

Most laps led
Driver	Kevin Harvick	Stewart–Haas Racing
- Laps: 201

Winner
No. 4	Kevin Harvick	Stewart–Haas Racing

Television in the United States
- Network: FS1
- Announcers: Mike Joy, Jeff Gordon and Darrell Waltrip
- Nielsen ratings: 1.7 (Overnight)

Radio in the United States
- Radio: MRN
- Booth announcers: Joe Moore, Jeff Striegle and Rusty Wallace
- Turn announcers: Mike Bagley (Backstretch)

The 2018 AAA 400 Drive for Autism was a Monster Energy NASCAR Cup Series race held on May 6, 2018, at Dover International Speedway in Dover, Delaware. Contested over 400 laps on the 1-mile (1.6 km) concrete speedway, it was the 11th race of the 2018 Monster Energy NASCAR Cup Series season.

== Report ==
=== Background ===
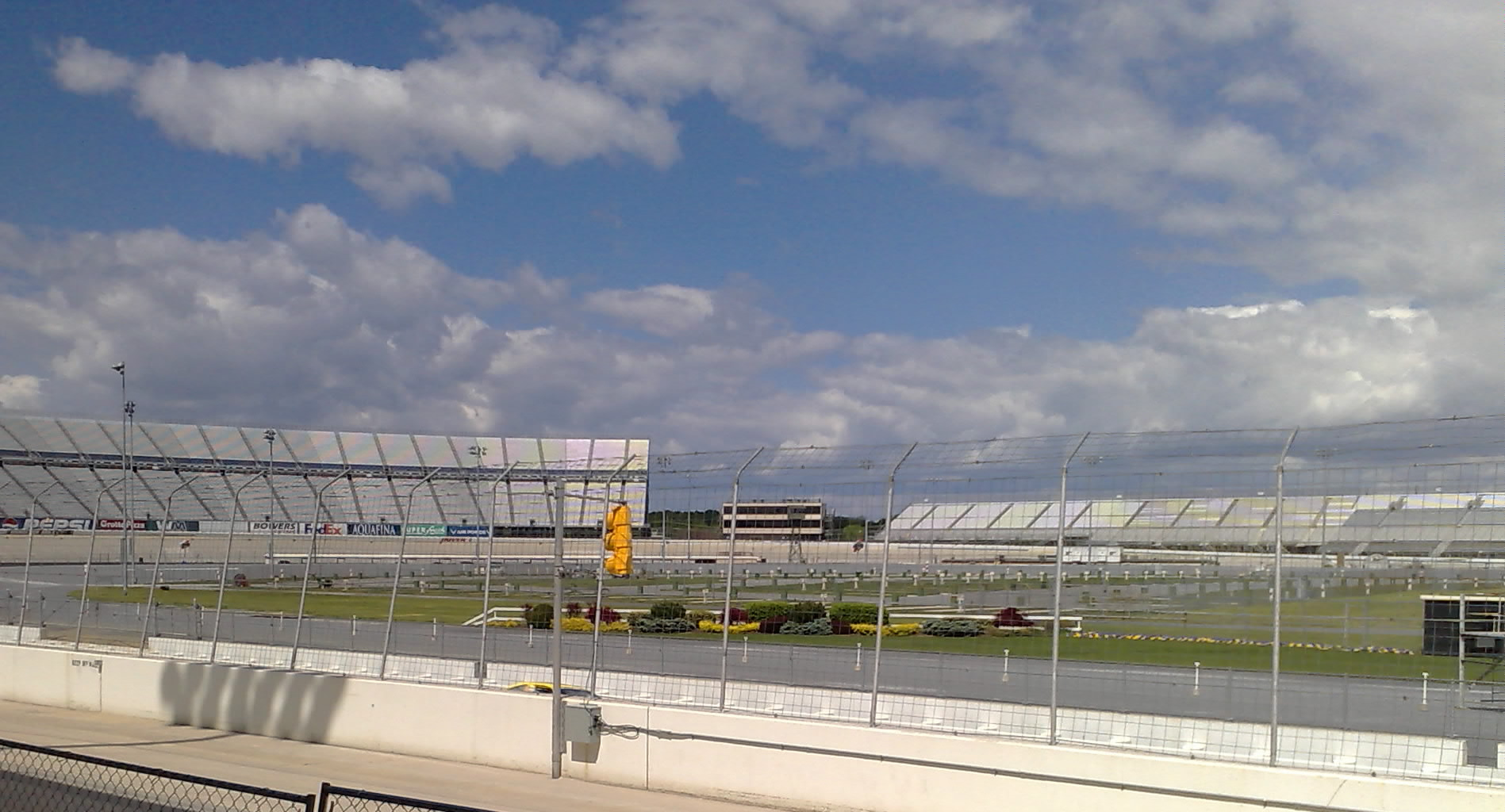
Dover International Speedway, the track where the race was held.

Dover International Speedway is an oval race track in Dover, Delaware, United States that has held at least two NASCAR races since it opened in 1969. In addition to NASCAR, the track also hosted USAC and the Verizon IndyCar Series. The track features one layout, a 1 mile (1.6 km) concrete oval, with 24° banking in the turns and 9° banking on the straights. The speedway is owned and operated by Dover Motorsports.

The track, nicknamed "The Monster Mile", was built in 1969 by Melvin Joseph of Melvin L. Joseph Construction Company, Inc., with an asphalt surface, but was replaced with concrete in 1995. Six years later in 2001, the track's capacity moved to 135,000 seats, making the track have the largest capacity of sports venue in the mid-Atlantic. In 2002, the name changed to Dover International Speedway from Dover Downs International Speedway after Dover Downs Gaming and Entertainment split, making Dover Motorsports. From 2007 to 2009, the speedway worked on an improvement project called "The Monster Makeover", which expanded facilities at the track and beautified the track. After the 2014 season, the track's capacity was reduced to 95,500 seats.

==== Entry list ====
No.	Driver	Team	Manufacturer
00	Landon Cassill	StarCom Racing	Chevrolet
1	Jamie McMurray	Chip Ganassi Racing	Chevrolet
2	Brad Keselowski	Team Penske	Ford
3	Austin Dillon	Richard Childress Racing	Chevrolet
4	Kevin Harvick	Stewart–Haas Racing	Ford
6	Trevor Bayne	Roush Fenway Racing	Ford
9	Chase Elliott	Hendrick Motorsports	Chevrolet
10	Aric Almirola	Stewart–Haas Racing	Ford
11	Denny Hamlin	Joe Gibbs Racing	Toyota
12	Ryan Blaney	Team Penske	Ford
13	Ty Dillon	Germain Racing	Chevrolet
14	Clint Bowyer	Stewart–Haas Racing	Ford
15	Ross Chastain (i)	Premium Motorsports	Chevrolet
17	Ricky Stenhouse Jr.	Roush Fenway Racing	Ford
18	Kyle Busch	Joe Gibbs Racing	Toyota
19	Daniel Suárez	Joe Gibbs Racing	Toyota
20	Erik Jones	Joe Gibbs Racing	Toyota
21	Paul Menard	Wood Brothers Racing	Ford
22	Joey Logano	Team Penske	Ford
23	Gray Gaulding	BK Racing	Toyota
24	William Byron (R)	Hendrick Motorsports	Chevrolet
31	Ryan Newman	Richard Childress Racing	Chevrolet
32	Matt DiBenedetto	Go Fas Racing	Ford
34	Michael McDowell	Front Row Motorsports	Ford
37	Chris Buescher	JTG Daugherty Racing	Chevrolet
38	David Ragan	Front Row Motorsports	Ford
41	Kurt Busch	Stewart–Haas Racing	Ford
42	Kyle Larson	Chip Ganassi Racing	Chevrolet
43	Bubba Wallace (R)	Richard Petty Motorsports	Chevrolet
47	A. J. Allmendinger	JTG Daugherty Racing	Chevrolet
48	Jimmie Johnson	Hendrick Motorsports	Chevrolet
51	Cody Ware (i)	Rick Ware Racing	Chevrolet
55	Reed Sorenson	Premium Motorsports	Chevrolet
72	Corey LaJoie	TriStar Motorsports	Chevrolet
78	Martin Truex Jr.	Furniture Row Racing	Toyota
88	Alex Bowman	Hendrick Motorsports	Chevrolet
95	Kasey Kahne	Leavine Family Racing	Chevrolet
99	Derrike Cope	StarCom Racing	Chevrolet
Official entry list

== First practice ==
Paul Menard was the fastest in the first practice session with a time of 22.524 seconds and a speed of 159.830 mph (257.221 km/h).

Pos	No.	Driver	Team	Manufacturer	Time	Speed
1	21	Paul Menard	Wood Brothers Racing	Ford	22.524	159.830
2	48	Jimmie Johnson	Hendrick Motorsports	Chevrolet	22.579	159.440
3	4	Kevin Harvick	Stewart–Haas Racing	Ford	22.583	159.412
Official first practice results

== Qualifying ==
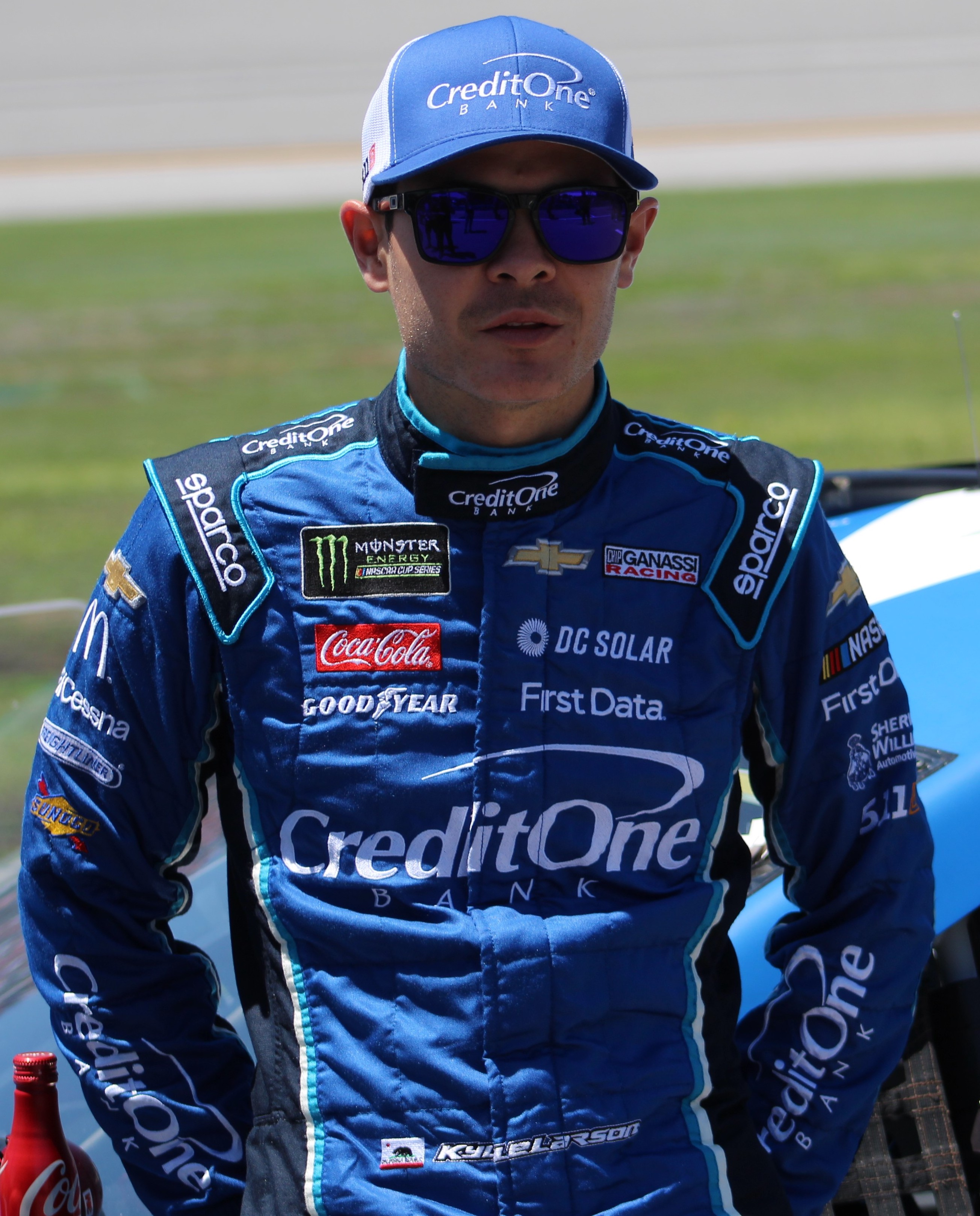
Kyle Larson scored the pole position.

Kyle Larson scored the pole for the race with a time of 22.770 and a speed of 158.103 mph (254.442 km/h).

=== Qualifying results ===
Pos	No.	Driver	Team	Manufacturer	R1	R2	R3
1	42	Kyle Larson	Chip Ganassi Racing	Chevrolet	23.096	22.867	22.770
2	4	Kevin Harvick	Stewart–Haas Racing	Ford	23.047	22.937	22.858
3	78	Martin Truex Jr.	Furniture Row Racing	Toyota	22.977	22.948	22.867
4	18	Kyle Busch	Joe Gibbs Racing	Toyota	22.913	22.980	22.897
5	17	Ricky Stenhouse Jr.	Roush Fenway Racing	Ford	23.077	22.924	22.929
6	9	Chase Elliott	Hendrick Motorsports	Chevrolet	23.047	22.891	22.969
7	19	Daniel Suárez	Joe Gibbs Racing	Toyota	23.088	22.920	22.997
8	2	Brad Keselowski	Team Penske	Ford	22.947	23.071	23.011
9	41	Kurt Busch	Stewart–Haas Racing	Ford	23.118	23.042	23.035
10	11	Denny Hamlin	Joe Gibbs Racing	Toyota	22.998	23.060	23.078
11	20	Erik Jones	Joe Gibbs Racing	Toyota	23.088	23.083	23.092
12	14	Clint Bowyer	Stewart–Haas Racing	Ford	23.112	23.049	23.121
13	10	Aric Almirola	Stewart–Haas Racing	Ford	23.170	23.096	—
14	12	Ryan Blaney	Team Penske	Ford	23.020	23.115	—
15	88	Alex Bowman	Hendrick Motorsports	Chevrolet	23.110	23.128	—
16	37	Chris Buescher	JTG Daugherty Racing	Chevrolet	23.274	23.149	—
17	24	William Byron (R)	Hendrick Motorsports	Chevrolet	23.301	23.179	—
18	22	Joey Logano	Team Penske	Ford	23.125	23.181	—
19	48	Jimmie Johnson	Hendrick Motorsports	Chevrolet	23.074	23.193	—
20	21	Paul Menard	Wood Brothers Racing	Ford	23.189	23.201	—
21	31	Ryan Newman	Richard Childress Racing	Chevrolet	23.306	23.222	—
22	6	Trevor Bayne	Roush Fenway Racing	Ford	23.257	23.274	—
23	1	Jamie McMurray	Chip Ganassi Racing	Chevrolet	23.229	23.301	—
24	32	Matt DiBenedetto	Go Fas Racing	Ford	23.288	23.495	—
25	95	Kasey Kahne	Leavine Family Racing	Chevrolet	23.306	—	—
26	43	Bubba Wallace (R)	Richard Petty Motorsports	Chevrolet	23.345	—	—
27	3	Austin Dillon	Richard Childress Racing	Chevrolet	23.360	—	—
28	47	A. J. Allmendinger	JTG Daugherty Racing	Chevrolet	23.375	—	—
29	34	Michael McDowell	Front Row Motorsports	Ford	23.384	—	—
30	13	Ty Dillon	Germain Racing	Chevrolet	23.459	—	—
31	15	Ross Chastain (i)	Premium Motorsports	Chevrolet	23.502	—	—
32	38	David Ragan	Front Row Motorsports	Ford	23.593	—	—
33	00	Landon Cassill	StarCom Racing	Chevrolet	23.649	—	—
34	55	Reed Sorenson	Premium Motorsports	Chevrolet	24.026	—	—
35	23	Gray Gaulding	BK Racing	Toyota	24.048	—	—
36	99	Derrike Cope	StarCom Racing	Chevrolet	24.884	—	—
37	51	Cody Ware (i)	Rick Ware Racing	Chevrolet	25.442	—	—
38	72	Corey LaJoie	TriStar Motorsports	Chevrolet	0.000	—	—
Official qualifying results

== Practice (post-qualifying) ==
=== Second practice ===
Joey Logano was the fastest in the second practice session with a time of 22.858 seconds and a speed of 157.494 mph (253.462 km/h).

Pos	No.	Driver	Team	Manufacturer	Time	Speed
1	22	Joey Logano	Team Penske	Ford	22.858	157.494
2	2	Brad Keselowski	Team Penske	Ford	22.864	157.453
3	78	Martin Truex Jr.	Furniture Row Racing	Toyota	22.923	157.048
Official second practice results

=== Final practice ===
Aric Almirola was the fastest in the final practice session with a time of 22.745 seconds and a speed of 158.277 mph (254.722 km/h).

Pos	No.	Driver	Team	Manufacturer	Time	Speed
1	10	Aric Almirola	Stewart–Haas Racing	Ford	22.745	158.277
2	9	Chase Elliott	Hendrick Motorsports	Chevrolet	22.777	158.054
3	14	Clint Bowyer	Stewart–Haas Racing	Ford	22.797	157.916
Official final practice results

== Race ==
=== Stage Results ===
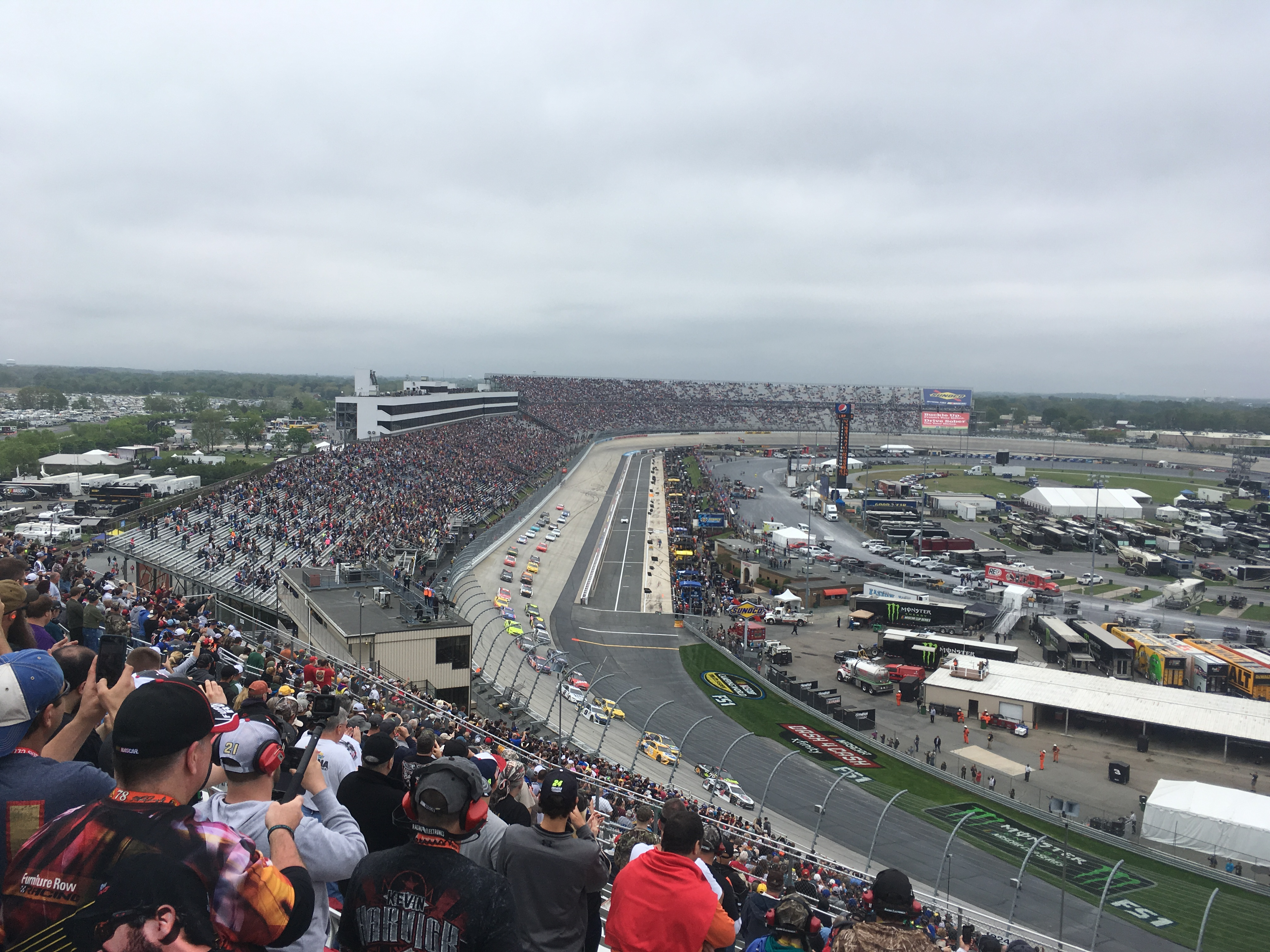
Eventual race winner Kevin Harvick leads on the first lap

Stage 1 Laps: 120

Pos	No	Driver	Team	Manufacturer	Points
1	4	Kevin Harvick	Stewart–Haas Racing	Ford	10
2	18	Kyle Busch	Joe Gibbs Racing	Toyota	9
3	2	Brad Keselowski	Team Penske	Ford	8
4	19	Daniel Suárez	Joe Gibbs Racing	Toyota	7
5	41	Kurt Busch	Stewart–Haas Racing	Ford	6
6	9	Chase Elliott	Hendrick Motorsports	Chevrolet	5
7	14	Clint Bowyer	Stewart–Haas Racing	Ford	4
8	48	Jimmie Johnson	Hendrick Motorsports	Chevrolet	3
9	22	Joey Logano	Team Penske	Ford	2
10	12	Ryan Blaney	Team Penske	Ford	1
Official stage one results

Stage 2 Laps: 120

Pos	No	Driver	Team	Manufacturer	Points
1	4	Kevin Harvick	Stewart–Haas Racing	Ford	10
2	2	Brad Keselowski	Team Penske	Ford	9
3	18	Kyle Busch	Joe Gibbs Racing	Toyota	8
4	48	Jimmie Johnson	Hendrick Motorsports	Chevrolet	7
5	14	Clint Bowyer	Stewart–Haas Racing	Ford	6
6	19	Daniel Suárez	Joe Gibbs Racing	Toyota	5
7	78	Martin Truex Jr.	Furniture Row Racing	Toyota	4
8	12	Ryan Blaney	Team Penske	Ford	3
9	9	Chase Elliott	Hendrick Motorsports	Chevrolet	2
10	22	Joey Logano	Team Penske	Ford	1
Official stage two results

=== Final Stage Results ===
Stage 3 Laps: 160

Pos	Grid	No	Driver	Team	Manufacturer	Laps	Points
1	2	4	Kevin Harvick	Stewart–Haas Racing	Ford	400	60
2	12	14	Clint Bowyer	Stewart–Haas Racing	Ford	400	45
3	7	19	Daniel Suárez	Joe Gibbs Racing	Toyota	400	46
4	3	78	Martin Truex Jr.	Furniture Row Racing	Toyota	400	37
5	9	41	Kurt Busch	Stewart–Haas Racing	Ford	400	38
6	8	2	Brad Keselowski	Team Penske	Ford	400	48
7	10	11	Denny Hamlin	Joe Gibbs Racing	Toyota	400	30
8	14	12	Ryan Blaney	Team Penske	Ford	400	33
9	19	48	Jimmie Johnson	Hendrick Motorsports	Chevrolet	400	38
10	1	42	Kyle Larson	Chip Ganassi Racing	Chevrolet	400	27
11	13	10	Aric Almirola	Stewart–Haas Racing	Ford	400	26
12	6	9	Chase Elliott	Hendrick Motorsports	Chevrolet	400	32
13	18	22	Joey Logano	Team Penske	Ford	400	27
14	17	24	William Byron (R)	Hendrick Motorsports	Chevrolet	399	23
15	5	17	Ricky Stenhouse Jr.	Roush Fenway Racing	Ford	399	22
16	23	1	Jamie McMurray	Chip Ganassi Racing	Chevrolet	399	21
17	25	95	Kasey Kahne	Leavine Family Racing	Chevrolet	399	20
18	11	20	Erik Jones	Joe Gibbs Racing	Toyota	399	19
19	22	6	Trevor Bayne	Roush Fenway Racing	Ford	398	18
20	16	37	Chris Buescher	JTG Daugherty Racing	Chevrolet	398	17
21	28	47	A. J. Allmendinger	JTG Daugherty Racing	Chevrolet	397	16
22	29	34	Michael McDowell	Front Row Motorsports	Ford	397	15
23	15	88	Alex Bowman	Hendrick Motorsports	Chevrolet	397	14
24	30	13	Ty Dillon	Germain Racing	Chevrolet	396	13
25	26	43	Bubba Wallace (R)	Richard Petty Motorsports	Chevrolet	396	12
26	27	3	Austin Dillon	Richard Childress Racing	Chevrolet	395	11
27	32	38	David Ragan	Front Row Motorsports	Ford	395	10
28	31	15	Ross Chastain (i)	Premium Motorsports	Chevrolet	393	0
29	24	32	Matt DiBenedetto	Go Fas Racing	Ford	392	8
30	35	23	Gray Gaulding	BK Racing	Toyota	386	7
31	33	00	Landon Cassill	StarCom Racing	Chevrolet	385	6
32	34	55	Reed Sorenson	Premium Motorsports	Chevrolet	382	5
33	21	31	Ryan Newman	Richard Childress Racing	Chevrolet	377	4
34	20	21	Paul Menard	Wood Brothers Racing	Ford	354	3
35	4	18	Kyle Busch	Joe Gibbs Racing	Toyota	271	19
36	37	51	Cody Ware (i)	Rick Ware Racing	Chevrolet	244	0
37	36	99	Derrike Cope	StarCom Racing	Chevrolet	145	1
38	38	72	Corey LaJoie	TriStar Motorsports	Chevrolet	20	1
Official race results

=== Race statistics ===
- Lead changes: 6 among different drivers
- Cautions/Laps: 8 for 48
- Red flags: 1 for 41 minutes and 1 second
- Time of race: 3 hours, 28 minutes and 37 seconds
- Average speed: 115.044 miles per hour (185.145 km/h)

== Media ==
=== Television ===
Fox Sports covered their 18th race at the Dover International Speedway. Mike Joy, five-time Dover winner Jeff Gordon and two-time Dover winner Darrell Waltrip had the call in the booth for the race. Jamie Little, Vince Welch and Matt Yocum handled the action on pit road for the television side.

FS1
Booth announcers	Pit reporters
Lap-by-lap: Mike Joy; Color-commentator: Jeff Gordon; Color commentator: Darrell Waltrip	Jamie Little; Vince Welch; Matt Yocum

=== Radio ===
MRN had the radio call for the race which was also simulcasted on Sirius XM NASCAR Radio.

MRN Radio
Booth announcers	Turn announcers	Pit reporters
Lead announcer: Joe Moore; Announcer: Jeff Striegle; Announcer: Rusty Wallace	Backstretch: Mike Bagley	Kim Coon; Alex Hayden; Dillon Welch; Steve Post

== Standings after the race ==
Drivers' Championship standings

	Pos	Driver	Points
	1	Kyle Busch	466
	2	Joey Logano	444 (–22)
	3	Kevin Harvick	426 (–40)
	4	Clint Bowyer	380 (–86)
1	5	Brad Keselowski	365 (–101)
1	6	Kurt Busch	358 (–108)
1	7	Ryan Blaney	346 (–120)
1	8	Denny Hamlin	344 (–122)
	9	Martin Truex Jr.	340 (–126)
	10	Kyle Larson	307 (–159)
	11	Aric Almirola	304 (–162)
2	12	Jimmie Johnson	268 (–198)
	13	Erik Jones	253 (–213)
2	14	Alex Bowman	252 (–214)
3	15	Chase Elliott	241 (–225)
1	16	Ricky Stenhouse Jr.	239 (–227)
Official driver's standings

Manufacturers' Championship standings

Pos	Manufacturer	Points
1	Ford	399
2	Toyota	393 (–6)
3	Chevrolet	359 (–40)
Official manufacturers' standings

- Note: Only the first 16 positions are included for the driver standings.
- . – Driver has clinched a position in the Monster Energy NASCAR Cup Series playoffs.

Previous race: 2018 GEICO 500	Monster Energy NASCAR Cup Series; 2018 season	Next race: 2018 KC Masterpiece 400
