= 2018 KC Masterpiece 400 =

Race details
- Race 12 of 36 in the 2018 Monster Energy NASCAR Cup Series
- The 2018 KC Masterpiece 400 program cover.
- Date: May 12, 2018
- Location: Kansas Speedway in Kansas City, Kansas
- Course: Permanent racing facility
- Course length: 1.5 miles (2.4 km)
- Distance: 267 laps, 400.5 mi (644.542 km)
- Average speed: 128.395 miles per hour (206.632 km/h)

Pole position
Driver	Kevin Harvick	Stewart–Haas Racing
- Time: 28.600

Most laps led
Driver	Kyle Larson	Chip Ganassi Racing
- Laps: 101

Winner
No. 4	Kevin Harvick	Stewart–Haas Racing

Television in the United States
- Network: FS1
- Announcers: Mike Joy, Jeff Gordon and Darrell Waltrip
- Nielsen ratings: 1.2/1.23 (Overnight)

Radio in the United States
- Radio: MRN
- Booth announcers: Joe Moore, Jeff Striegle and Rusty Wallace
- Turn announcers: Dave Moody (1 & 2) and Mike Bagley (3 & 4)

The 2018 KC Masterpiece 400 was a Monster Energy NASCAR Cup Series race held on May 12, 2018, at Kansas Speedway in Kansas City, Kansas. Contested over 267 laps on the 1.5 mile (2.4 km) asphalt speedway, it was the 12th race of the 2018 Monster Energy NASCAR Cup Series season.

== Report ==
=== Background ===
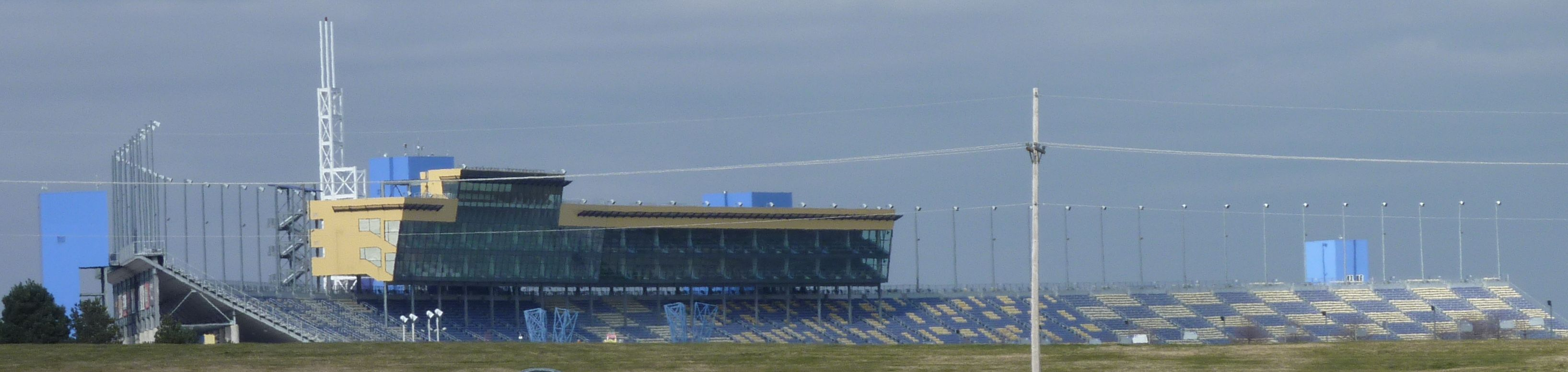
Kansas Speedway, the track where the race was held.

Kansas Speedway is a 1.5-mile (2.4 km) tri-oval race track in Kansas City, Kansas. It was built in 2001 and hosts two annual NASCAR race weekends. The Verizon IndyCar Series also raced at here until 2011. The speedway is owned and operated by the International Speedway Corporation.

==== Entry list ====
Matt Kenseth, who last raced in the 2017 Ford EcoBoost 400, made his first Cup series return, in the No. 6 for Roush Fenway Racing, doing so part-time. This was also the first Cup race since the 2014 Quicken Loans Race for Heroes 500 where Trevor Bayne did not participate.

No.	Driver	Team	Manufacturer
00	Landon Cassill	StarCom Racing	Chevrolet
1	Jamie McMurray	Chip Ganassi Racing	Chevrolet
2	Brad Keselowski	Team Penske	Ford
3	Austin Dillon	Richard Childress Racing	Chevrolet
4	Kevin Harvick	Stewart–Haas Racing	Ford
6	Matt Kenseth	Roush Fenway Racing	Ford
9	Chase Elliott	Hendrick Motorsports	Chevrolet
10	Aric Almirola	Stewart–Haas Racing	Ford
11	Denny Hamlin	Joe Gibbs Racing	Toyota
12	Ryan Blaney	Team Penske	Ford
13	Ty Dillon	Germain Racing	Chevrolet
14	Clint Bowyer	Stewart–Haas Racing	Ford
15	Ross Chastain (i)	Premium Motorsports	Chevrolet
17	Ricky Stenhouse Jr.	Roush Fenway Racing	Ford
18	Kyle Busch	Joe Gibbs Racing	Toyota
19	Daniel Suárez	Joe Gibbs Racing	Toyota
20	Erik Jones	Joe Gibbs Racing	Toyota
21	Paul Menard	Wood Brothers Racing	Ford
22	Joey Logano	Team Penske	Ford
23	Gray Gaulding	BK Racing	Toyota
24	William Byron (R)	Hendrick Motorsports	Chevrolet
31	Ryan Newman	Richard Childress Racing	Chevrolet
32	Matt DiBenedetto	Go Fas Racing	Ford
34	Michael McDowell	Front Row Motorsports	Ford
37	Chris Buescher	JTG Daugherty Racing	Chevrolet
38	David Ragan	Front Row Motorsports	Ford
41	Kurt Busch	Stewart–Haas Racing	Ford
42	Kyle Larson	Chip Ganassi Racing	Chevrolet
43	Bubba Wallace (R)	Richard Petty Motorsports	Chevrolet
47	A. J. Allmendinger	JTG Daugherty Racing	Chevrolet
48	Jimmie Johnson	Hendrick Motorsports	Chevrolet
51	B. J. McLeod (i)	Rick Ware Racing	Chevrolet
55	Reed Sorenson	Premium Motorsports	Chevrolet
66	Timmy Hill (i)	MBM Motorsports	Toyota
72	Corey LaJoie	TriStar Motorsports	Chevrolet
78	Martin Truex Jr.	Furniture Row Racing	Toyota
88	Alex Bowman	Hendrick Motorsports	Chevrolet
95	Kasey Kahne	Leavine Family Racing	Chevrolet
Official entry list

== Final Practice ==
Kevin Harvick was the fastest in the final practice session with a time of 29.009 seconds and a speed of 186.149 mph (299.578 km/h).

Pos	No.	Driver	Team	Manufacturer	Time	Speed
1	4	Kevin Harvick	Stewart–Haas Racing	Ford	29.009	186.149
2	42	Kyle Larson	Chip Ganassi Racing	Chevrolet	29.035	185.982
3	18	Kyle Busch	Joe Gibbs Racing	Toyota	29.163	185.166
Official final practice results

== Qualifying ==
Kevin Harvick scored the pole for the race with a time of 28.600 and a speed of 188.811 mph (303.862 km/h).

=== Qualifying results ===
Pos	No.	Driver	Team	Manufacturer	R1	R2	R3
1	4	Kevin Harvick	Stewart–Haas Racing	Ford	28.569	28.556	28.600
2	12	Ryan Blaney	Team Penske	Ford	28.565	28.722	28.750
3	18	Kyle Busch	Joe Gibbs Racing	Toyota	28.760	28.760	28.792
4	10	Aric Almirola	Stewart–Haas Racing	Ford	28.666	28.790	28.811
5	2	Brad Keselowski	Team Penske	Ford	28.841	28.909	28.916
6	11	Denny Hamlin	Joe Gibbs Racing	Toyota	28.974	29.013	28.963
7	78	Martin Truex Jr.	Furniture Row Racing	Toyota	29.011	28.882	29.001
8	41	Kurt Busch	Stewart–Haas Racing	Ford	28.746	28.850	29.002
9	22	Joey Logano	Team Penske	Ford	28.812	28.816	29.048
10	37	Chris Buescher	JTG Daugherty Racing	Chevrolet	28.904	29.007	29.080
11	21	Paul Menard	Wood Brothers Racing	Ford	28.749	28.961	29.115
12	20	Erik Jones	Joe Gibbs Racing	Toyota	28.841	28.862	29.169
13	24	William Byron (R)	Hendrick Motorsports	Chevrolet	28.991	29.051	—
14	19	Daniel Suárez	Joe Gibbs Racing	Toyota	28.962	29.090	—
15	31	Ryan Newman	Richard Childress Racing	Chevrolet	28.995	29.094	—
16	17	Ricky Stenhouse Jr.	Roush Fenway Racing	Ford	28.879	29.101	—
17	9	Chase Elliott	Hendrick Motorsports	Chevrolet	28.980	29.173	—
18	47	A. J. Allmendinger	JTG Daugherty Racing	Chevrolet	29.027	29.281	—
19	88	Alex Bowman	Hendrick Motorsports	Chevrolet	28.833	29.311	—
20	38	David Ragan	Front Row Motorsports	Ford	29.132	29.321	—
21	43	Bubba Wallace (R)	Richard Petty Motorsports	Chevrolet	29.128	29.367	—
22	42	Kyle Larson	Chip Ganassi Racing	Chevrolet	28.618	0.000	—
23	48	Jimmie Johnson	Hendrick Motorsports	Chevrolet	29.087	0.000	—
24	1	Jamie McMurray	Chip Ganassi Racing	Chevrolet	29.131	0.000	—
25	3	Austin Dillon	Richard Childress Racing	Chevrolet	29.214	—	—
26	13	Ty Dillon	Germain Racing	Chevrolet	29.558	—	—
27	72	Corey LaJoie	TriStar Motorsports	Chevrolet	29.943	—	—
28	15	Ross Chastain (i)	Premium Motorsports	Chevrolet	30.031	—	—
29	23	Gray Gaulding	BK Racing	Toyota	30.035	—	—
30	55	Reed Sorenson	Premium Motorsports	Chevrolet	30.181	—	—
31	00	Landon Cassill	StarCom Racing	Chevrolet	30.216	—	—
32	51	B. J. McLeod (i)	Rick Ware Racing	Chevrolet	30.623	—	—
33	14	Clint Bowyer	Stewart–Haas Racing	Ford	0.000	—	—
34	95	Kasey Kahne	Leavine Family Racing	Chevrolet	0.000	—	—
35	6	Matt Kenseth	Roush Fenway Racing	Ford	0.000	—	—
36	34	Michael McDowell	Front Row Motorsports	Ford	0.000	—	—
37	32	Matt DiBenedetto	Go Fas Racing	Ford	0.000	—	—
38	66	Timmy Hill (i)	MBM Motorsports	Toyota	0.000	—	—
Official qualifying results

== Race ==
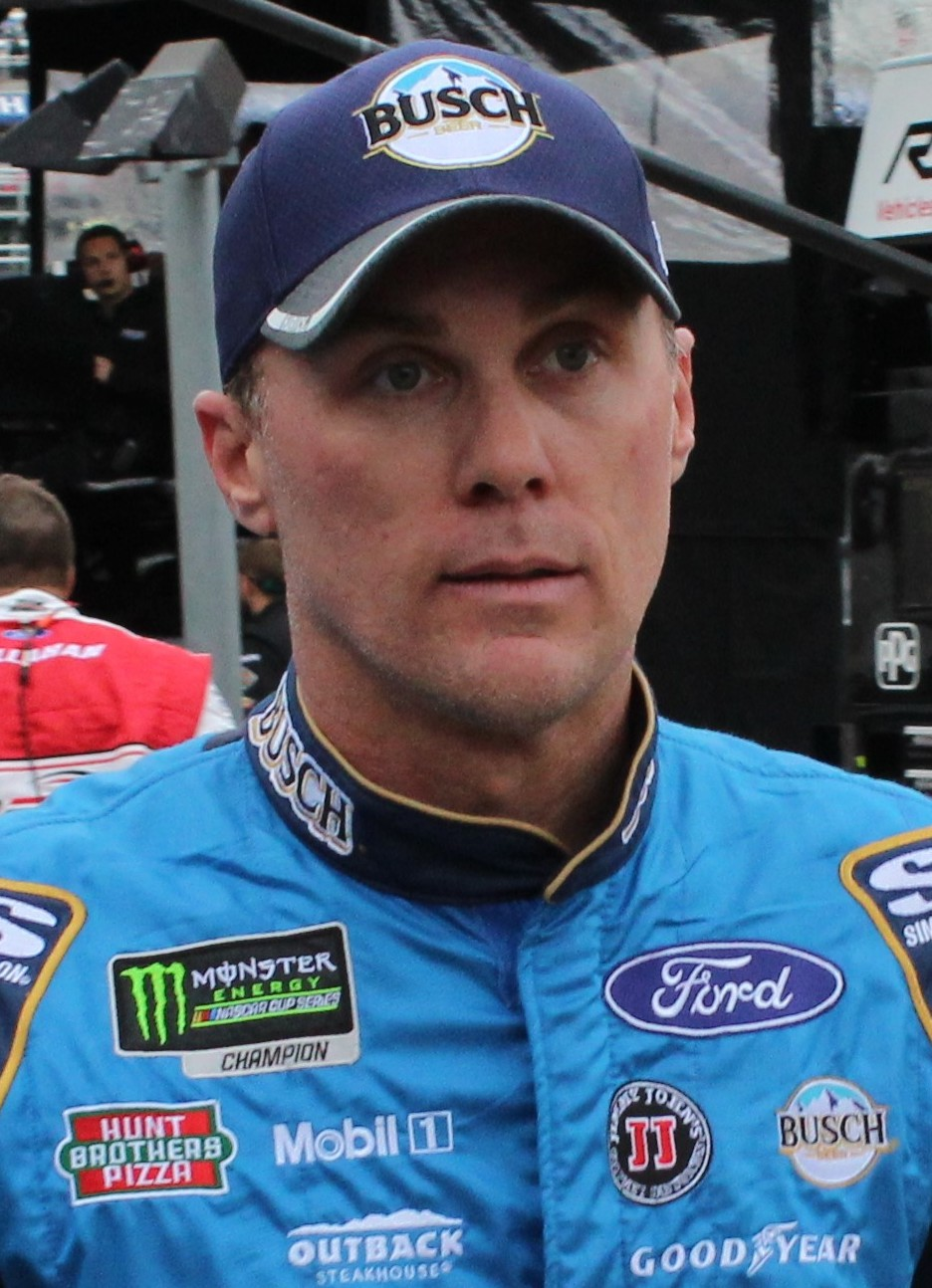
Kevin Harvick won the race from the pole position.

=== Stage Results ===
Stage 1 Laps: 80

Pos	No	Driver	Team	Manufacturer	Points
1	12	Ryan Blaney	Team Penske	Ford	10
2	4	Kevin Harvick	Stewart–Haas Racing	Ford	9
3	2	Brad Keselowski	Team Penske	Ford	8
4	22	Joey Logano	Team Penske	Ford	7
5	42	Kyle Larson	Chip Ganassi Racing	Chevrolet	6
6	10	Aric Almirola	Stewart–Haas Racing	Ford	5
7	11	Denny Hamlin	Joe Gibbs Racing	Toyota	4
8	18	Kyle Busch	Joe Gibbs Racing	Toyota	3
9	41	Kurt Busch	Stewart–Haas Racing	Ford	2
10	14	Clint Bowyer	Stewart–Haas Racing	Ford	1
Official stage one results

Stage 2 Laps: 80

Pos	No	Driver	Team	Manufacturer	Points
1	42	Kyle Larson	Chip Ganassi Racing	Chevrolet	10
2	4	Kevin Harvick	Stewart–Haas Racing	Ford	9
3	12	Ryan Blaney	Team Penske	Ford	8
4	18	Kyle Busch	Joe Gibbs Racing	Toyota	7
5	22	Joey Logano	Team Penske	Ford	6
6	10	Aric Almirola	Stewart–Haas Racing	Ford	5
7	41	Kurt Busch	Stewart–Haas Racing	Ford	4
8	14	Clint Bowyer	Stewart–Haas Racing	Ford	3
9	20	Erik Jones	Joe Gibbs Racing	Toyota	2
10	78	Martin Truex Jr.	Furniture Row Racing	Toyota	1
Official stage two results

=== Final Stage Results ===
Stage 3 Laps: 107

Pos	Grid	No	Driver	Team	Manufacturer	Laps	Points
1	1	4	Kevin Harvick	Stewart–Haas Racing	Ford	267	58
2	7	78	Martin Truex Jr.	Furniture Row Racing	Toyota	267	36
3	9	22	Joey Logano	Team Penske	Ford	267	47
4	22	42	Kyle Larson	Chip Ganassi Racing	Chevrolet	267	49
5	6	11	Denny Hamlin	Joe Gibbs Racing	Toyota	267	36
6	11	21	Paul Menard	Wood Brothers Racing	Ford	267	31
7	12	20	Erik Jones	Joe Gibbs Racing	Toyota	267	32
8	8	41	Kurt Busch	Stewart–Haas Racing	Ford	267	35
9	4	10	Aric Almirola	Stewart–Haas Racing	Ford	267	38
10	3	18	Kyle Busch	Joe Gibbs Racing	Toyota	267	37
11	16	17	Ricky Stenhouse Jr.	Roush Fenway Racing	Ford	267	26
12	17	9	Chase Elliott	Hendrick Motorsports	Chevrolet	267	25
13	20	38	David Ragan	Front Row Motorsports	Ford	267	24
14	5	2	Brad Keselowski	Team Penske	Ford	267	31
15	33	14	Clint Bowyer	Stewart–Haas Racing	Ford	267	26
16	18	47	A. J. Allmendinger	JTG Daugherty Racing	Chevrolet	266	21
17	25	3	Austin Dillon	Richard Childress Racing	Chevrolet	266	20
18	19	88	Alex Bowman	Hendrick Motorsports	Chevrolet	266	19
19	23	48	Jimmie Johnson	Hendrick Motorsports	Chevrolet	265	18
20	36	34	Michael McDowell	Front Row Motorsports	Ford	265	17
21	34	95	Kasey Kahne	Leavine Family Racing	Chevrolet	264	16
22	37	32	Matt DiBenedetto	Go Fas Racing	Ford	263	15
23	21	43	Bubba Wallace (R)	Richard Petty Motorsports	Chevrolet	262	14
24	27	72	Corey LaJoie	TriStar Motorsports	Chevrolet	262	13
25	31	00	Landon Cassill	StarCom Racing	Chevrolet	260	12
26	28	15	Ross Chastain (i)	Premium Motorsports	Chevrolet	259	0
27	30	55	Reed Sorenson	Premium Motorsports	Chevrolet	259	10
28	14	19	Daniel Suárez	Joe Gibbs Racing	Toyota	258	9
29	29	23	Gray Gaulding	BK Racing	Toyota	257	8
30	15	31	Ryan Newman	Richard Childress Racing	Chevrolet	253	7
31	24	1	Jamie McMurray	Chip Ganassi Racing	Chevrolet	253	6
32	38	66	Timmy Hill (i)	MBM Motorsports	Toyota	253	0
33	13	24	William Byron (R)	Hendrick Motorsports	Chevrolet	252	4
34	10	37	Chris Buescher	JTG Daugherty Racing	Chevrolet	252	3
35	32	51	B. J. McLeod (i)	Rick Ware Racing	Chevrolet	251	0
36	35	6	Matt Kenseth	Roush Fenway Racing	Ford	250	1
37	2	12	Ryan Blaney	Team Penske	Ford	247	19
38	26	13	Ty Dillon	Germain Racing	Chevrolet	247	1
Official race results

=== Race statistics ===
- Lead changes: 7 among different drivers
- Cautions/Laps: 6 for 31
- Red flags: 1 for 13 minutes and 13 seconds
- Time of race: 2 hours, 53 minutes and 38 seconds
- Average speed: 128.395 miles per hour (206.632 km/h)

== Media ==
=== Television ===
Fox Sports covered their eighth race at the Kansas Speedway. Mike Joy, three-time Kansas winner Jeff Gordon and Darrell Waltrip called in the booth for the race. Jamie Little, Vince Welch and Matt Yocum handled the action on pit road for the television side.

FS1
Booth announcers	Pit reporters
Lap-by-lap: Mike Joy; Color-commentator: Jeff Gordon; Color commentator: Darrell Waltrip	Jamie Little; Vince Welch; Matt Yocum

=== Radio ===
MRN had the radio call for the race which was also simulcasted on Sirius XM NASCAR Radio. Alex Hayden, Jeff Striegle and Rusty Wallace called the race in the booth when the field raced through the tri-oval. Dave Moody covered the race from the Sunoco spotters stand outside turn 2 when the field is racing through turns 1 and 2. Mike Bagley called the race from a platform outside turn 4. Pete Pistone, Kim Coon, and Steve Post worked pit road for the radio side.

MRN Radio
Booth announcers	Turn announcers	Pit reporters
Lead announcer: Jeff Striegle; Announcer: Alex Hayden; Announcer: Rusty Wallace	Turns 1 & 2: Dave Moody; Turns 3 & 4: Mike Bagley	Pete Pistone; Kim Coon; Steve Post

== Standings after the race ==
Drivers' Championship standings

	Pos	Driver	Points
	1	Kyle Busch	503
	2	Joey Logano	491 (–12)
	3	Kevin Harvick	484 (–19)
1	4	Brad Keselowski	396 (–107)
1	5	Kurt Busch	393 (–110)
2	6	Clint Bowyer	386 (–117)
1	7	Denny Hamlin	380 (–123)
1	8	Martin Truex Jr.	376 (–127)
2	9	Ryan Blaney	365 (–138)
	10	Kyle Larson	356 (–147)
	11	Aric Almirola	342 (–161)
	12	Jimmie Johnson	286 (–217)
	13	Erik Jones	285 (–218)
	14	Alex Bowman	271 (–232)
	15	Chase Elliott	266 (–237)
	16	Ricky Stenhouse Jr.	265 (–238)
Official driver's standings

Manufacturers' Championship standings

Pos	Manufacturer	Points
1	Ford	439
2	Toyota	427 (–12)
3	Chevrolet	392 (–47)
Official manufacturers' standings

- Note: Only the first 16 positions are included for the driver standings.
- . – Driver has clinched a position in the Monster Energy NASCAR Cup Series playoffs.

Previous race: 2018 AAA 400 Drive for Autism	Monster Energy NASCAR Cup Series; 2018 season	Next race: 2018 Coca-Cola 600
