= 2018 GEICO 500 =

Race details
- Race 10 of 36 in the 2018 Monster Energy NASCAR Cup Series
- Date: April 29, 2018
- Location: Talladega Superspeedway in Lincoln, Alabama
- Course: Permanent racing facility
- Course length: 2.66 miles (4.28 km)
- Distance: 188 laps, 500.08 mi (804.64 km)
- Average speed: 152.489 miles per hour (245.407 km/h)

Pole position
| Driver | Kevin Harvick | Stewart–Haas Racing |
- Time: 49.247

Most laps led
| Driver | Joey Logano | Team Penske |
- Laps: 70

Winner
| No. 22 | Joey Logano | Team Penske |

Television in the United States
- Network: Fox
- Announcers: Mike Joy, Jeff Gordon and Darrell Waltrip
- Nielsen ratings: 2.9/2.8 (Overnight)

Radio in the United States
- Radio: MRN
- Booth announcers: Joe Moore, Jeff Striegle and Rusty Wallace
- Turn announcers: Dave Moody (1 & 2), Mike Bagley (Backstretch) and Kyle Rickey (3 & 4)

The 2018 GEICO 500 was a Monster Energy NASCAR Cup Series race held on April 29, 2018, at Talladega Superspeedway in Lincoln, Alabama. Contested over 188 laps on the 2.66 mile (4.28 km) superspeedway, it was the 10th race of the 2018 Monster Energy NASCAR Cup Series season.

== Report ==
=== Background ===
Talladega Superspeedway, the track where the race will be held

Talladega Superspeedway, formerly known as Alabama International Motor Speedway, is a motorsports complex located north of Talladega, Alabama. It is located on the former Anniston Air Force Base in the small city of Lincoln. A tri-oval, the track was constructed in 1969 by the International Speedway Corporation, a business controlled by the France family. Talladega is most known for its steep banking. The track currently hosts NASCAR's Monster Energy NASCAR Cup Series, Xfinity Series and Camping World Truck Series. Talladega is the longest NASCAR oval with a length of 2.66-mile-long (4.28 km) tri-oval like the Daytona International Speedway, which is a 2.5-mile-long (4.0 km).

==== Entry list ====
| No. | Driver | Team | Manufacturer |
|---|---|---|---|
| 00 | Joey Gase (i) | StarCom Racing | Chevrolet |
| 1 | Jamie McMurray | Chip Ganassi Racing | Chevrolet |
| 2 | Brad Keselowski | Team Penske | Ford |
| 3 | Austin Dillon | Richard Childress Racing | Chevrolet |
| 4 | Kevin Harvick | Stewart–Haas Racing | Ford |
| 6 | Trevor Bayne | Roush Fenway Racing | Ford |
| 9 | Chase Elliott | Hendrick Motorsports | Chevrolet |
| 10 | Aric Almirola | Stewart–Haas Racing | Ford |
| 11 | Denny Hamlin | Joe Gibbs Racing | Toyota |
| 12 | Ryan Blaney | Team Penske | Ford |
| 13 | Ty Dillon | Germain Racing | Chevrolet |
| 14 | Clint Bowyer | Stewart–Haas Racing | Ford |
| 15 | Ross Chastain (i) | Premium Motorsports | Chevrolet |
| 17 | Ricky Stenhouse Jr. | Roush Fenway Racing | Ford |
| 18 | Kyle Busch | Joe Gibbs Racing | Toyota |
| 19 | Daniel Suárez | Joe Gibbs Racing | Toyota |
| 20 | Erik Jones | Joe Gibbs Racing | Toyota |
| 21 | Paul Menard | Wood Brothers Racing | Ford |
| 22 | Joey Logano | Team Penske | Ford |
| 23 | Gray Gaulding | BK Racing | Toyota |
| 24 | William Byron (R) | Hendrick Motorsports | Chevrolet |
| 31 | Ryan Newman | Richard Childress Racing | Chevrolet |
| 32 | Matt DiBenedetto | Go Fas Racing | Ford |
| 34 | Michael McDowell | Front Row Motorsports | Ford |
| 37 | Chris Buescher | JTG Daugherty Racing | Chevrolet |
| 38 | David Ragan | Front Row Motorsports | Ford |
| 41 | Kurt Busch | Stewart–Haas Racing | Ford |
| 42 | Kyle Larson | Chip Ganassi Racing | Chevrolet |
| 43 | Bubba Wallace (R) | Richard Petty Motorsports | Chevrolet |
| 47 | A. J. Allmendinger | JTG Daugherty Racing | Chevrolet |
| 48 | Jimmie Johnson | Hendrick Motorsports | Chevrolet |
| 51 | Timmy Hill (i) | Rick Ware Racing | Chevrolet |
| 55 | Reed Sorenson | Premium Motorsports | Chevrolet |
| 62 | Brendan Gaughan | Beard Motorsports | Chevrolet |
| 72 | Cole Whitt | TriStar Motorsports | Chevrolet |
| 78 | Martin Truex Jr. | Furniture Row Racing | Toyota |
| 88 | Alex Bowman | Hendrick Motorsports | Chevrolet |
| 92 | Timothy Peters (i) | RBR Enterprises | Ford |
| 95 | Kasey Kahne | Leavine Family Racing | Chevrolet |
| 96 | D. J. Kennington | Gaunt Brothers Racing | Toyota |
Official entry list

== Practice ==
=== First practice ===
Ty Dillon was the fastest in the first practice session with a time of 47.182 seconds and a speed of 202.959 mph (326.631 km/h).

| Pos | No. | Driver | Team | Manufacturer | Time | Speed |
|---|---|---|---|---|---|---|
| 1 | 13 | Ty Dillon | Germain Racing | Chevrolet | 47.182 | 202.959 |
| 2 | 19 | Daniel Suárez | Joe Gibbs Racing | Toyota | 47.247 | 202.680 |
| 3 | 18 | Kyle Busch | Joe Gibbs Racing | Toyota | 47.247 | 202.680 |
Official first practice results

=== Final practice ===
Jamie McMurray was the fastest in the final practice session with a time of 46.947 seconds and a speed of 203.975 mph (328.266 km/h). The practice was marred by a three-car crash on the back-straightaway that resulted in McMurray barrel rolling several times into the inside catchfence while Ty Dillon and Ryan Newman were also involved. McMurray's accident led to NASCAR reducing the restrictor plates from 7/8th to 55/64th of an inch.

| Pos | No. | Driver | Team | Manufacturer | Time | Speed |
|---|---|---|---|---|---|---|
| 1 | 1 | Jamie McMurray | Chip Ganassi Racing | Chevrolet | 46.947 | 203.975 |
| 2 | 13 | Ty Dillon | Germain Racing | Chevrolet | 47.031 | 203.610 |
| 3 | 19 | Daniel Suárez | Joe Gibbs Racing | Toyota | 47.154 | 203.079 |
Official final practice results

== Qualifying ==
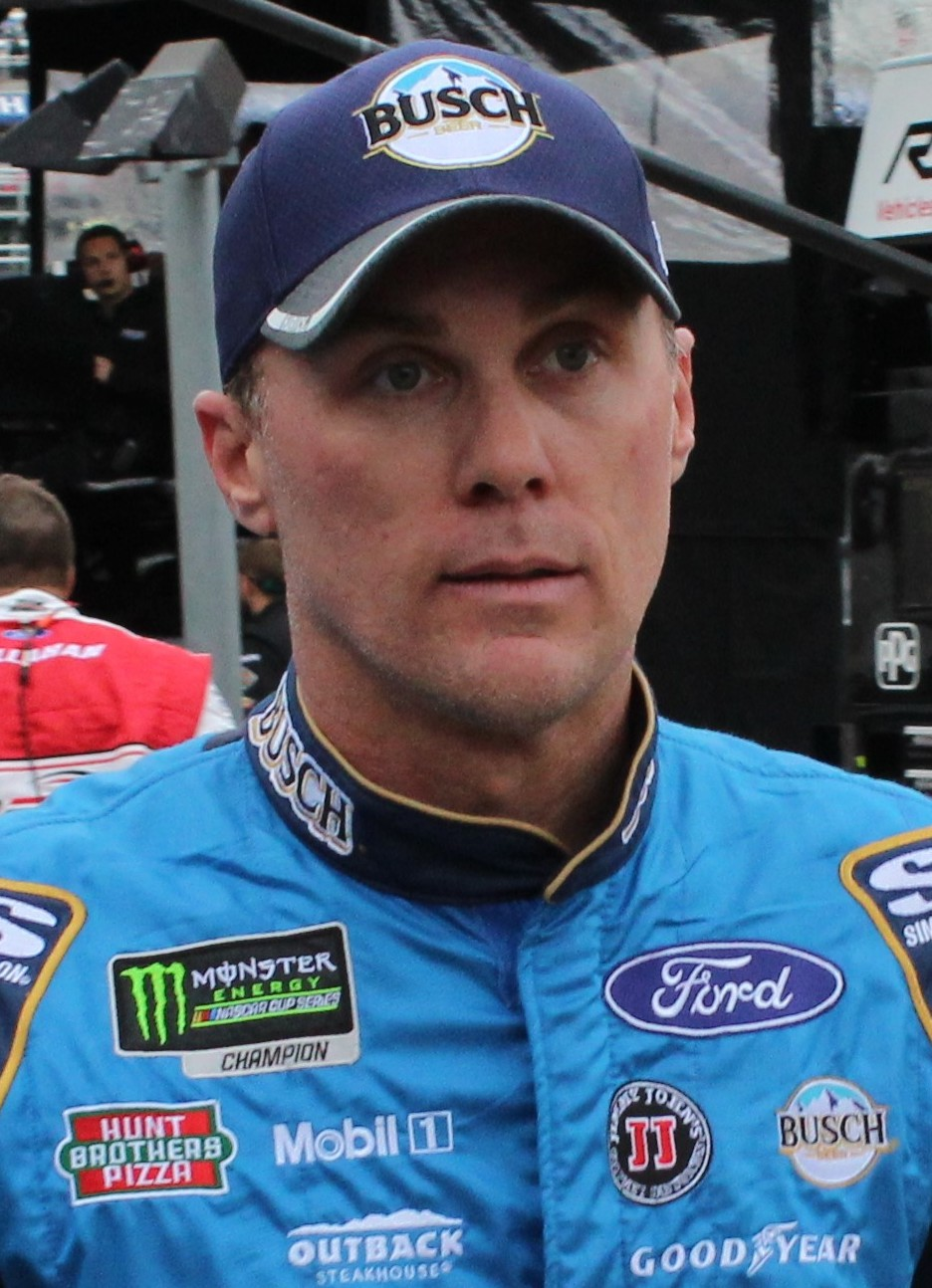
Kevin Harvick scored the pole position.

Kevin Harvick scored the pole for the race with a time of 49.247 and a speed of 194.448 mph (312.934 km/h).

=== Qualifying results ===
| Pos | No. | Driver | Team | Manufacturer | R1 | R2 |
|---|---|---|---|---|---|---|
| 1 | 4 | Kevin Harvick | Stewart–Haas Racing | Ford | 49.291 | 49.247 |
| 2 | 41 | Kurt Busch | Stewart–Haas Racing | Ford | 49.381 | 49.340 |
| 3 | 78 | Martin Truex Jr. | Furniture Row Racing | Toyota | 49.692 | 49.482 |
| 4 | 11 | Denny Hamlin | Joe Gibbs Racing | Toyota | 49.829 | 49.633 |
| 5 | 9 | Chase Elliott | Hendrick Motorsports | Chevrolet | 49.722 | 49.680 |
| 6 | 20 | Erik Jones | Joe Gibbs Racing | Toyota | 49.715 | 49.686 |
| 7 | 17 | Ricky Stenhouse Jr. | Roush Fenway Racing | Ford | 49.951 | 49.900 |
| 8 | 14 | Clint Bowyer | Stewart–Haas Racing | Ford | 49.969 | 49.947 |
| 9 | 22 | Joey Logano | Team Penske | Ford | 49.872 | 49.968 |
| 10 | 2 | Brad Keselowski | Team Penske | Ford | 49.941 | 50.046 |
| 11 | 88 | Alex Bowman | Hendrick Motorsports | Chevrolet | 49.973 | 50.071 |
| 12 | 38 | David Ragan | Front Row Motorsports | Ford | 49.991 | 50.113 |
| 13 | 21 | Paul Menard | Wood Brothers Racing | Ford | 50.009 | — |
| 14 | 19 | Daniel Suárez | Joe Gibbs Racing | Toyota | 50.011 | — |
| 15 | 43 | Bubba Wallace (R) | Richard Petty Motorsports | Chevrolet | 50.054 | — |
| 16 | 48 | Jimmie Johnson | Hendrick Motorsports | Chevrolet | 50.068 | — |
| 17 | 24 | William Byron (R) | Hendrick Motorsports | Chevrolet | 50.087 | — |
| 18 | 31 | Ryan Newman | Richard Childress Racing | Chevrolet | 50.107 | — |
| 19 | 18 | Kyle Busch | Joe Gibbs Racing | Toyota | 50.109 | — |
| 20 | 34 | Michael McDowell | Front Row Motorsports | Ford | 50.138 | — |
| 21 | 6 | Trevor Bayne | Roush Fenway Racing | Ford | 50.140 | — |
| 22 | 42 | Kyle Larson | Chip Ganassi Racing | Chevrolet | 50.151 | — |
| 23 | 12 | Ryan Blaney | Team Penske | Ford | 50.269 | — |
| 24 | 3 | Austin Dillon | Richard Childress Racing | Chevrolet | 50.363 | — |
| 25 | 37 | Chris Buescher | JTG Daugherty Racing | Chevrolet | 50.454 | — |
| 26 | 95 | Kasey Kahne | Leavine Family Racing | Chevrolet | 50.462 | — |
| 27 | 1 | Jamie McMurray | Chip Ganassi Racing | Chevrolet | 50.474 | — |
| 28 | 47 | A. J. Allmendinger | JTG Daugherty Racing | Chevrolet | 50.476 | — |
| 29 | 13 | Ty Dillon | Germain Racing | Chevrolet | 50.762 | — |
| 30 | 62 | Brendan Gaughan | Beard Motorsports | Chevrolet | 50.766 | — |
| 31 | 96 | D. J. Kennington | Gaunt Brothers Racing | Toyota | 51.145 | — |
| 32 | 92 | Timothy Peters (i) | RBR Enterprises | Ford | 51.190 | — |
| 33 | 32 | Matt DiBenedetto | Go Fas Racing | Ford | 51.319 | — |
| 34 | 00 | Joey Gase (i) | StarCom Racing | Chevrolet | 51.484 | — |
| 35 | 15 | Ross Chastain (i) | Premium Motorsports | Chevrolet | 51.564 | — |
| 36 | 72 | Cole Whitt | TriStar Motorsports | Chevrolet | 51.710 | — |
| 37 | 23 | Gray Gaulding | BK Racing | Toyota | 52.102 | — |
| 38 | 55 | Reed Sorenson | Premium Motorsports | Chevrolet | 52.372 | — |
| 39 | 51 | Timmy Hill (i) | Rick Ware Racing | Chevrolet | 52.647 | — |
| 40 | 10 | Aric Almirola | Stewart–Haas Racing | Ford | 54.604 | — |
Official qualifying results

== Race ==
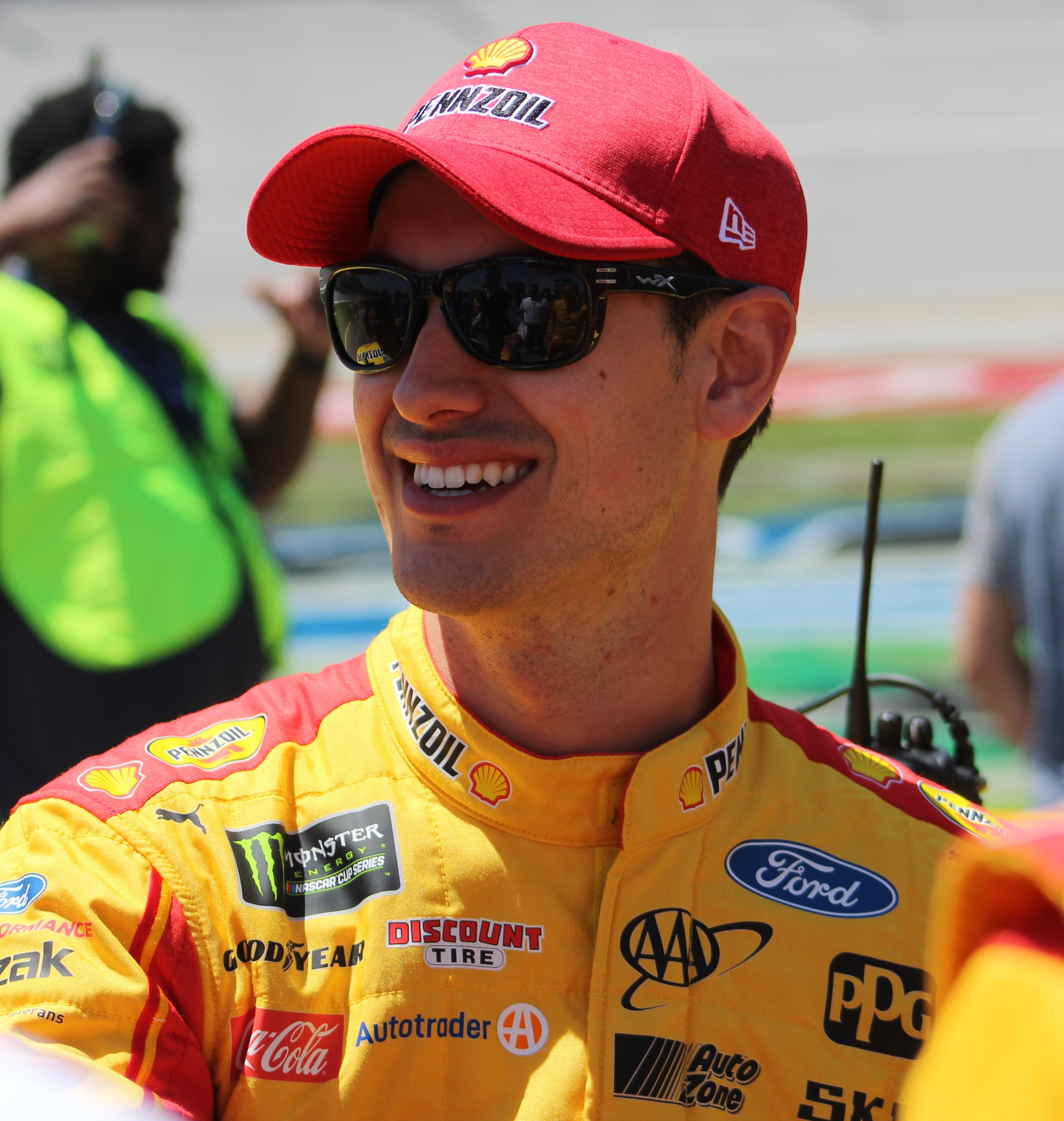
Joey Logano won the race.

=== Stage Results ===
Stage 1 Laps: 55

| Pos | No | Driver | Team | Manufacturer | Points |
|---|---|---|---|---|---|
| 1 | 2 | Brad Keselowski | Team Penske | Ford | 10 |
| 2 | 22 | Joey Logano | Team Penske | Ford | 9 |
| 3 | 78 | Martin Truex Jr. | Furniture Row Racing | Toyota | 8 |
| 4 | 18 | Kyle Busch | Joe Gibbs Racing | Toyota | 7 |
| 5 | 21 | Paul Menard | Wood Brothers Racing | Ford | 6 |
| 6 | 11 | Denny Hamlin | Joe Gibbs Racing | Toyota | 5 |
| 7 | 12 | Ryan Blaney | Team Penske | Ford | 4 |
| 8 | 17 | Ricky Stenhouse Jr. | Roush Fenway Racing | Ford | 3 |
| 9 | 4 | Kevin Harvick | Stewart–Haas Racing | Ford | 2 |
| 10 | 48 | Jimmie Johnson | Hendrick Motorsports | Chevrolet | 1 |
Official stage one results

Stage 2 Laps: 55

| Pos | No | Driver | Team | Manufacturer | Points |
|---|---|---|---|---|---|
| 1 | 21 | Paul Menard | Wood Brothers Racing | Ford | 10 |
| 2 | 22 | Joey Logano | Team Penske | Ford | 9 |
| 3 | 12 | Ryan Blaney | Team Penske | Ford | 8 |
| 4 | 4 | Kevin Harvick | Stewart–Haas Racing | Ford | 7 |
| 5 | 17 | Ricky Stenhouse Jr. | Roush Fenway Racing | Ford | 6 |
| 6 | 38 | David Ragan | Front Row Motorsports | Ford | 5 |
| 7 | 48 | Jimmie Johnson | Hendrick Motorsports | Chevrolet | 4 |
| 8 | 41 | Kurt Busch | Stewart–Haas Racing | Ford | 3 |
| 9 | 24 | William Byron (R) | Hendrick Motorsports | Chevrolet | 2 |
| 10 | 18 | Kyle Busch | Joe Gibbs Racing | Toyota | 1 |
Official stage two results

=== Final Stage Results ===
Stage 3 Laps: 78

| Pos | Grid | No | Driver | Team | Manufacturer | Laps | Points |
|---|---|---|---|---|---|---|---|
| 1 | 9 | 22 | Joey Logano | Team Penske | Ford | 188 | 58 |
| 2 | 2 | 41 | Kurt Busch | Stewart–Haas Racing | Ford | 188 | 38 |
| 3 | 5 | 9 | Chase Elliott | Hendrick Motorsports | Chevrolet | 188 | 34 |
| 4 | 1 | 4 | Kevin Harvick | Stewart–Haas Racing | Ford | 188 | 42 |
| 5 | 7 | 17 | Ricky Stenhouse Jr. | Roush Fenway Racing | Ford | 188 | 41 |
| 6 | 12 | 38 | David Ragan | Front Row Motorsports | Ford | 188 | 36 |
| 7 | 40 | 10 | Aric Almirola | Stewart–Haas Racing | Ford | 188 | 30 |
| 8 | 11 | 88 | Alex Bowman | Hendrick Motorsports | Chevrolet | 188 | 29 |
| 9 | 18 | 31 | Ryan Newman | Richard Childress Racing | Chevrolet | 188 | 28 |
| 10 | 14 | 19 | Daniel Suárez | Joe Gibbs Racing | Toyota | 188 | 27 |
| 11 | 25 | 37 | Chris Buescher | JTG Daugherty Racing | Chevrolet | 188 | 26 |
| 12 | 16 | 48 | Jimmie Johnson | Hendrick Motorsports | Chevrolet | 188 | 30 |
| 13 | 19 | 18 | Kyle Busch | Joe Gibbs Racing | Toyota | 188 | 32 |
| 14 | 4 | 11 | Denny Hamlin | Joe Gibbs Racing | Toyota | 188 | 28 |
| 15 | 29 | 13 | Ty Dillon | Germain Racing | Chevrolet | 188 | 22 |
| 16 | 15 | 43 | Bubba Wallace (R) | Richard Petty Motorsports | Chevrolet | 188 | 21 |
| 17 | 26 | 95 | Kasey Kahne | Leavine Family Racing | Chevrolet | 188 | 20 |
| 18 | 23 | 12 | Ryan Blaney | Team Penske | Ford | 188 | 31 |
| 19 | 33 | 32 | Matt DiBenedetto | Go Fas Racing | Ford | 188 | 18 |
| 20 | 31 | 96 | D. J. Kennington | Gaunt Brothers Racing | Toyota | 188 | 17 |
| 21 | 36 | 72 | Cole Whitt | TriStar Motorsports | Chevrolet | 188 | 16 |
| 22 | 30 | 62 | Brendan Gaughan | Beard Motorsports | Chevrolet | 188 | 15 |
| 23 | 32 | 92 | Timothy Peters (i) | RBR Enterprises | Ford | 187 | 0 |
| 24 | 37 | 23 | Gray Gaulding | BK Racing | Toyota | 187 | 13 |
| 25 | 35 | 15 | Ross Chastain (i) | Premium Motorsports | Chevrolet | 186 | 0 |
| 26 | 3 | 78 | Martin Truex Jr. | Furniture Row Racing | Toyota | 184 | 19 |
| 27 | 34 | 00 | Joey Gase (i) | StarCom Racing | Chevrolet | 178 | 0 |
| 28 | 27 | 1 | Jamie McMurray | Chip Ganassi Racing | Chevrolet | 174 | 9 |
| 29 | 17 | 24 | William Byron (R) | Hendrick Motorsports | Chevrolet | 165 | 10 |
| 30 | 13 | 21 | Paul Menard | Wood Brothers Racing | Ford | 165 | 23 |
| 31 | 8 | 14 | Clint Bowyer | Stewart–Haas Racing | Ford | 165 | 6 |
| 32 | 20 | 34 | Michael McDowell | Front Row Motorsports | Ford | 165 | 5 |
| 33 | 10 | 2 | Brad Keselowski | Team Penske | Ford | 165 | 14 |
| 34 | 28 | 47 | A. J. Allmendinger | JTG Daugherty Racing | Chevrolet | 165 | 3 |
| 35 | 24 | 3 | Austin Dillon | Richard Childress Racing | Chevrolet | 165 | 2 |
| 36 | 39 | 51 | Timmy Hill (i) | Rick Ware Racing | Chevrolet | 151 | 0 |
| 37 | 38 | 55 | Reed Sorenson | Premium Motorsports | Chevrolet | 79 | 1 |
| 38 | 21 | 6 | Trevor Bayne | Roush Fenway Racing | Ford | 71 | 1 |
| 39 | 6 | 20 | Erik Jones | Joe Gibbs Racing | Toyota | 71 | 1 |
| 40 | 22 | 42 | Kyle Larson | Chip Ganassi Racing | Chevrolet | 71 | 1 |
Official race results

=== Race statistics ===
- Lead changes: 16 among different drivers
- Cautions/Laps: 6 for 29
- Red flags: 0
- Time of race: 3 hours, 16 minutes and 46 seconds
- Average speed: 152.489 miles per hour (245.407 km/h)

== Media ==
=== Television ===
Fox Sports covered their 18th race at the Talladega Superspeedway. Mike Joy, six-time Talladega winner – and all-time restrictor plate race wins record holder – Jeff Gordon and four-time Talladega winner Darrell Waltrip called the race in the booth for the race. Jamie Little, Vince Welch and Matt Yocum handled the action on pit road for the television side.

Fox Television
| Booth announcers | Pit reporters |
|---|---|
| Lap-by-lap: Mike Joy; Color-commentator: Jeff Gordon; Color commentator: Darrell Waltrip | Jamie Little; Vince Welch; Matt Yocum |

=== Radio ===
MRN had the radio call for the race which was also simulcast on Sirius XM NASCAR Radio. Joe Moore, Jeff Striegle and Rusty Wallace called the race in the booth when the field raced through the tri-oval. Dave Moody called the race from the Sunoco spotters stand outside turn 2 when the field raced through turns 1 and 2. Mike Bagley called the race from a platform inside the backstretch when the field raced down the backstretch. Kyle Rickey called the race from the Sunoco spotters stand outside turn 4 when the field raced through turns 3 and 4. Alex Hayden, Winston Kelley, Kim Coon, and Steve Post worked pit road for the radio side.

MRN Radio
| Booth announcers | Turn announcers | Pit reporters |
|---|---|---|
| Lead announcer: Joe Moore; Announcer: Jeff Striegle; Announcer: Rusty Wallace | Turns 1 & 2: Dave Moody; Backstretch: Mike Bagley; Turns 3 & 4: Kyle Rickey | Alex Hayden; Winston Kelley; Kim Coon; Steve Post |

== Standings after the race ==
Drivers' Championship standings

| | Pos | Driver | Points |
|---|---|---|---|
| | 1 | Kyle Busch | 447 |
| | 2 | Joey Logano | 417 (–30) |
| 1 | 3 | Kevin Harvick | 366 (–81) |
| 1 | 4 | Clint Bowyer | 335 (–112) |
| 4 | 5 | Kurt Busch | 320 (–127) |
| 1 | 6 | Brad Keselowski | 317 (–130) |
| 1 | 7 | Denny Hamlin | 314 (–133) |
| | 8 | Ryan Blaney | 313 (–134) |
| 2 | 9 | Martin Truex Jr. | 303 (–144) |
| | 10 | Kyle Larson | 280 (–167) |
| | 11 | Aric Almirola | 278 (–169) |
| 1 | 12 | Alex Bowman | 238 (–209) |
| 1 | 13 | Erik Jones | 234 (–213) |
| 1 | 14 | Jimmie Johnson | 230 (–217) |
| 4 | 15 | Ricky Stenhouse Jr. | 217 (–230) |
| 1 | 16 | Ryan Newman | 214 (–233) |
Official driver's standings

Manufacturers' Championship standings

| | Pos | Manufacturer | Points |
|---|---|---|---|
| 1 | 1 | Ford | 359 |
| 1 | 2 | Toyota | 359 (–0) |
| | 3 | Chevrolet | 331 (–28) |
Official manufacturers' standings

- Note: Only the first 16 positions are included for the driver standings.
- . – Driver has clinched a position in the Monster Energy NASCAR Cup Series playoffs.

| Previous race: 2018 Toyota Owners 400 | Monster Energy NASCAR Cup Series; 2018 season | Next race: 2018 AAA 400 Drive for Autism |
