= 2015 Kroger 200 =

20th race of the 2015 NASCAR Camping World Truck Series

Race details
- Race 20 of 23 of the 2015 NASCAR Camping World Truck Series
- Date: October 31, 2015
- Official name: 17th Annual Kroger 200
- Location: Martinsville Speedway, Ridgeway, Virginia
- Course: Permanent racing facility
- Course length: 0.526 miles (0.847 km)
- Distance: 200 laps, 105 mi (169 km)
- Scheduled distance: 200 laps, 105 mi (169 km)
- Average speed: 60.615 mph (97.550 km/h)

Pole position
Driver	Cole Custer	JR Motorsports
- Time: 19.530

Most laps led
Driver	Cole Custer	JR Motorsports
- Laps: 96

Winner
No. 88	Matt Crafton	ThorSport Racing

Television in the United States
- Network: FS1
- Announcers: Adam Alexander, Phil Parsons, and Michael Waltrip

Radio in the United States
- Radio: MRN

The 2015 Kroger 200 was the 20th stock car race of the 2015 NASCAR Camping World Truck Series, and the 17th iteration of the event. The race was held on Saturday, October 31, 2015, in Ridgeway, Virginia at Martinsville Speedway, a 0.526 mi (0.847 km) permanent paperclip shaped racetrack. The race took the scheduled 200 laps to complete. Matt Crafton, driving for ThorSport Racing, would hold off the field on the final restart with two laps to go, and earned his 10th career NASCAR Camping World Truck Series win, and his fifth of the season. Pole-sitter Cole Custer dominated the majority of the race, leading a race-high 96 laps. To fill out the podium, John Hunter Nemechek, driving for family-owned SWM-NEMCO Motorsports, and Cameron Hayley, driving for ThorSport Racing, would finish 2nd and 3rd, respectively.

== Background ==
The layout of Martinsville Speedway, the circuit where the race was held.

Martinsville Speedway is a stock car racing short track in Ridgeway, Virginia, just south of Martinsville. The track was also one of the first paved oval tracks in stock car racing, being built in 1947 by partners H. Clay Earles, Henry Lawrence, and Sam Rice, nearly a year before NASCAR was officially formed. It is also the only race track that has been on the NASCAR circuit from its beginning in 1948. Along with this, Martinsville is the only oval track on the NASCAR circuit to have asphalt surfaces on the straightaways and concrete to cover the turns. At 0.526 miles (847 m) in length, it is the shortest track in the NASCAR Sprint Cup Series. It is owned by International Speedway Corporation, a wholly owned subsidiary of NASCAR.

=== Entry list ===
- (R) denotes rookie driver.
- (i) denotes driver who is ineligible for series driver points.

#	Driver	Team	Make	Sponsor
00	Cole Custer	JR Motorsports	Chevrolet	Haas Automation
0	Brad Foy	Jennifer Jo Cobb Racing	Chevrolet	Driven2Honor.org
1	Camden Murphy	Rick Ware Racing	Chevrolet	Rick Ware Racing
02	Tyler Young	Young's Motorsports	Chevrolet	Randco, Young's Building Systems
4	Erik Jones (R)	Kyle Busch Motorsports	Toyota	Toyota
05	John Wes Townley	Athenian Motorsports	Chevrolet	Zaxby's
5	Dalton Sargeant	Wauters Motorsports	Toyota	Galt
6	Norm Benning	Norm Benning Racing	Chevrolet	Norm Benning Racing
07	Ray Black Jr. (R)	SS-Green Light Racing	Chevrolet	ScubaLife
08	Brandon Hightower	MB Motorsports	Chevrolet	Advanced Specialized Carriers
8	John Hunter Nemechek (R)	SWM-NEMCO Motorsports	Chevrolet	SWM-NEMCO Motorsports
10	Jennifer Jo Cobb	Jennifer Jo Cobb Racing	Chevrolet	Driven2Honor.org
11	Ben Kennedy	Red Horse Racing	Toyota	Local Motors
13	Cameron Hayley (R)	ThorSport Racing	Toyota	Carolina Nut Co.
14	Daniel Hemric (R)	NTS Motorsports	Chevrolet	California Clean Power
15	Mason Mingus	Billy Boat Motorsports	Chevrolet	Call 811 Before You Dig
17	Timothy Peters	Red Horse Racing	Toyota	Red Horse Racing
18	Ross Kenseth (i)	Hattori Racing Enterprises	Toyota	Aisin AW
19	Tyler Reddick	Brad Keselowski Racing	Ford	Brad Keselowski's Checkered Flag Foundation
23	Spencer Gallagher (R)	GMS Racing	Chevrolet	Allegiant Travel Company
29	Austin Cindric	Brad Keselowski Racing	Ford	Cooper-Standard Automotive
32	Justin Haley	Braun Motorsports	Chevrolet	Great Clips
33	Brandon Jones (R)	GMS Racing	Chevrolet	Lucas Oil
35	Jim Weiler	Empire Racing	Ford	RoadRenovations.com
50	Travis Kvapil	MAKE Motorsports	Chevrolet	CorvetteParts.net
51	Daniel Suárez (i)	Kyle Busch Motorsports	Toyota	Arris
54	Gray Gaulding	Kyle Busch Motorsports	Toyota	Krispy Kreme
63	Bobby Pierce	MB Motorsports	Chevrolet	Pixographs
74	Paige Decker	Mike Harmon Racing	RAM	Mike Harmon Racing
75	Caleb Holman	Henderson Motorsports	Chevrolet	Food Country USA, Tide Pods
82	Austin Hill	Empire Racing	Ford	Empire Racing Driver Development
86	Brandon Brown	Brandonbilt Motorsports	Chevrolet	Coastal Carolina University
87	Chuck Buchanan Jr.	Charles Buchanan Racing	Ford	Spring Drug
88	Matt Crafton	ThorSport Racing	Toyota	Fisher Nuts, Menards
92	David Gilliland (i)	RBR Enterprises	Ford	Black's Tire Service
94	Timmy Hill	Premium Motorsports	Chevrolet	Testoril, Champion Machinery
98	Johnny Sauter	ThorSport Racing	Toyota	Smokey Mountain Herbal Snuff
Official entry list

== Practice ==
=== First practice ===
The first practice session was held on Friday, October 30, at 1:00 PM EST, and would last for 55 minutes. Timothy Peters, driving for Red Horse Racing, would set the fastest time in the session, with a lap of 19.721, and an average speed of 96.020 mph (154.529 km/h).

Pos.	#	Driver	Team	Make	Time	Speed
1	17	Timothy Peters	Red Horse Racing	Toyota	19.721	96.020
2	88	Matt Crafton	ThorSport Racing	Toyota	19.776	95.752
3	13	Cameron Hayley (R)	ThorSport Racing	Toyota	19.805	95.612
Full first practice results

=== Final practice ===
The final practice session was held on Friday, October 30, at 2:30 PM EST, and would last for 1 hour and 20 minutes. Timothy Peters, driving for Red Horse Racing, would set the fastest time in the session, with a lap of 19.708, and an average speed of 96.083 mph (154.631 km/h).

Pos.	#	Driver	Team	Make	Time	Speed
1	17	Timothy Peters	Red Horse Racing	Toyota	19.708	96.083
2	13	Cameron Hayley (R)	ThorSport Racing	Toyota	19.712	96.063
3	02	Tyler Young	Young's Motorsports	Chevrolet	19.838	95.453
Full final practice results

== Qualifying ==
Qualifying was held on Saturday, October 31, at 10:15 AM EST. The qualifying system used is a multi car, multi lap, three round system where in the first round, everyone would set a time to determine positions 25–32. Then, the fastest 24 qualifiers would move on to the second round to determine positions 13–24. Lastly, the fastest 12 qualifiers would move on to the third round to determine positions 1–12.

Cole Custer, driving for JR Motorsports, would win the pole after advancing from the preliminary rounds and setting the fastest time in Round 3, with a lap of 19.530, and an average speed of 96.959 mph (156.040 km/h).

Brandon Brown, Camden Murphy, Jim Weiler, and Charles Buchanan Jr. would fail to qualify.

=== Full qualifying results ===
Pos.	#	Driver	Team	Make	Time (R1)	Speed (R1)	Time (R2)	Speed (R2)	Time (R3)	Speed (R3)
1	00	Cole Custer	JR Motorsports	Chevrolet	19.860	95.347	19.690	96.171	19.530	96.959
2	13	Cameron Hayley (R)	ThorSport Racing	Toyota	19.782	95.723	19.707	96.088	19.622	96.504
3	8	John Hunter Nemechek (R)	SWM-NEMCO Motorsports	Chevrolet	20.073	94.336	19.750	95.878	19.679	96.224
4	19	Tyler Reddick	Brad Keselowski Racing	Ford	19.973	94.808	19.692	96.161	19.696	96.141
5	14	Daniel Hemric (R)	NTS Motorsports	Chevrolet	19.853	95.381	19.626	96.484	19.720	96.024
6	51	Daniel Suárez (i)	Kyle Busch Motorsports	Toyota	20.026	94.557	19.755	95.854	19.752	95.869
7	54	Gray Gaulding	Kyle Busch Motorsports	Toyota	20.075	94.326	19.744	95.908	19.762	95.820
8	4	Erik Jones (R)	Kyle Busch Motorsports	Toyota	19.992	94.718	19.746	95.898	19.781	95.728
9	02	Tyler Young	Young's Motorsports	Chevrolet	19.911	95.103	19.768	95.791	19.813	95.574
10	11	Ben Kennedy	Red Horse Racing	Toyota	19.835	95.468	19.786	95.704	19.859	95.352
11	17	Timothy Peters	Red Horse Racing	Toyota	20.057	94.411	19.647	96.381	19.870	95.299
12	92	David Gilliland (i)	RBR Enterprises	Ford	19.907	95.122	19.785	95.709	19.886	95.223
Eliminated from Round 2
13	88	Matt Crafton	ThorSport Racing	Toyota	19.936	94.984	19.789	95.690	–	–
14	29	Austin Cindric	Brad Keselowski Racing	Ford	19.931	95.008	19.805	95.612	–	–
15	5	Dalton Sargeant	Wauters Motorsports	Toyota	20.065	94.373	19.807	95.603	–	–
16	33	Brandon Jones (R)	GMS Racing	Chevrolet	20.039	94.496	19.829	95.496	–	–
17	98	Johnny Sauter	ThorSport Racing	Toyota	20.102	94.200	19.833	95.477	–	–
18	75	Caleb Holman	Henderson Motorsports	Chevrolet	19.853	95.381	19.853	95.381	–	–
19	15	Mason Mingus	Billy Boat Motorsports	Chevrolet	20.021	94.581	19.859	95.352	–	–
20	23	Spencer Gallagher (R)	GMS Racing	Chevrolet	20.039	94.496	19.884	95.232	–	–
21	07	Ray Black Jr. (R)	SS-Green Light Racing	Chevrolet	20.090	94.256	20.016	94.604	–	–
22	32	Justin Haley	Braun Motorsports	Chevrolet	19.959	94.874	20.102	94.200	–	–
23	50	Travis Kvapil	MAKE Motorsports	Chevrolet	20.098	94.218	20.154	93.957	–	–
24	94	Timmy Hill	Premium Motorsports	Chevrolet	20.065	94.373	–	–	–	–
Eliminated from Round 1
25	18	Ross Kenseth (i)	Hattori Racing Enterprises	Toyota	20.104	94.190	–	–	–	–
26	05	John Wes Townley	Athenian Motorsports	Chevrolet	20.107	94.176	–	–	–	–
27	82	Austin Hill	Empire Racing	Ford	20.110	94.162	–	–	–	–
Qualified by owner's points
28	63	Bobby Pierce	MB Motorsports	Chevrolet	20.295	93.304	–	–	–	–
29	08	Brandon Hightower	MB Motorsports	Chevrolet	20.377	92.928	–	–	–	–
30	1	Camden Murphy	Rick Ware Racing	Chevrolet	20.420	92.733				
31	74	Paige Decker	Mike Harmon Racing	Dodge	20.886	90.664	–	–	–	–
32	10	Jennifer Jo Cobb	Jennifer Jo Cobb Racing	Chevrolet	21.093	89.774	–	–	–	–
Failed to qualify
33	86	Brandon Brown	Brandonbilt Motorsports	Chevrolet	20.146	93.994	–	–	–	–
35	35	Jim Weiler	Empire Racing	Ford	20.623	91.820	–	–	–	–
36	87	Chuck Buchanan Jr.	Charles Buchanan Racing	Ford	21.608	87.634	–	–	–	–
Withdrew
37	6	Norm Benning	Norm Benning Racing	Chevrolet	20.758	91.223	–	–	–	–
38	0	Brad Foy	Jennifer Jo Cobb Racing	Chevrolet	–	–	–	–	–	–
Official qualifying results
Official starting lineup

== Race results ==
Fin	St	#	Driver	Team	Make	Laps	Led	Status	Pts	Winnings
1	13	88	Matt Crafton	ThorSport Racing	Toyota	200	63	Running	47	$39,197
2	3	8	John Hunter Nemechek (R)	SWM-NEMCO Motorsports	Chevrolet	200	32	Running	43	$29,673
3	2	13	Cameron Hayley (R)	ThorSport Racing	Toyota	200	0	Running	41	$21,627
4	1	00	Cole Custer	JR Motorsports	Chevrolet	200	96	Running	42	$23,569
5	4	19	Tyler Reddick	Brad Keselowski Racing	Ford	200	0	Running	39	$17,413
6	11	17	Timothy Peters	Red Horse Racing	Toyota	200	0	Running	38	$15,471
7	16	33	Brandon Jones (R)	GMS Racing	Chevrolet	200	0	Running	37	$15,005
8	18	75	Caleb Holman	Henderson Motorsports	Chevrolet	200	0	Running	36	$12,700
9	17	98	Johnny Sauter	ThorSport Racing	Toyota	200	0	Running	35	$14,895
10	8	4	Erik Jones (R)	Kyle Busch Motorsports	Toyota	200	0	Running	34	$15,789
11	26	05	John Wes Townley	Athenian Motorsports	Chevrolet	200	0	Running	33	$14,783
12	5	14	Daniel Hemric (R)	NTS Motorsports	Chevrolet	200	0	Running	32	$14,644
13	9	02	Tyler Young	Young's Motorsports	Chevrolet	200	0	Running	31	$14,589
14	10	11	Ben Kennedy	Red Horse Racing	Toyota	200	0	Running	30	$14,534
15	23	50	Travis Kvapil	MAKE Motorsports	Chevrolet	200	0	Running	29	$14,823
16	6	51	Daniel Suárez (i)	Kyle Busch Motorsports	Toyota	200	0	Running	0	$12,290
17	25	18	Ross Kenseth (i)	Hattori Racing Enterprises	Toyota	200	0	Running	0	$12,035
18	19	15	Mason Mingus	Billy Boat Motorsports	Chevrolet	200	0	Running	26	$14,228
19	27	82	Austin Hill	Empire Racing	Ford	200	0	Running	25	$11,923
20	21	07	Ray Black Jr. (R)	SS-Green Light Racing	Chevrolet	200	0	Running	24	$14,618
21	7	54	Gray Gaulding	Kyle Busch Motorsports	Toyota	200	9	Running	24	$14,090
22	28	63	Bobby Pierce	MB Motorsports	Chevrolet	200	0	Running	22	$14,062
23	12	92	David Gilliland (i)	RBR Enterprises	Ford	200	0	Running	0	$11,785
24	30	1	Camden Murphy	Rick Ware Racing	Chevrolet	200	0	Running	20	$12,757
25	14	29	Austin Cindric	Brad Keselowski Racing	Ford	200	0	Running	19	$12,852
26	24	94	Timmy Hill	Premium Motorsports	Chevrolet	199	0	Running	18	$11,674
27	29	08	Brandon Hightower	MB Motorsports	Chevrolet	196	0	Running	17	$11,591
28	15	5	Dalton Sargeant	Wauters Motorsports	Toyota	196	0	Running	16	$11,345
29	20	23	Spencer Gallagher (R)	GMS Racing	Chevrolet	196	0	Running	15	$11,290
30	31	74	Paige Decker	Mike Harmon Racing	RAM	193	0	Running	14	$10,790
31	32	10	Jennifer Jo Cobb	Jennifer Jo Cobb Racing	Chevrolet	186	0	Running	13	$9,290
32	22	32	Justin Haley	Braun Motorsports	Chevrolet	119	0	Accident	12	$8,290
Official race results

== Standings after the race ==
Drivers' Championship standings

	Pos	Driver	Points
	1	Erik Jones	776
1	2	Matt Crafton	766 (-10)
1	3	Tyler Reddick	763 (–13)
	4	Johnny Sauter	722 (–54)
	5	Timothy Peters	680 (–96)
	6	Cameron Hayley	663 (–113)
	7	Daniel Hemric	644 (–132)
	8	John Wes Townley	627 (–149)
	9	Ben Kennedy	595 (–181)
	10	Spencer Gallagher	574 (–202)
Official driver's standings

- Note: Only the first 10 positions are included for the driver standings.

Previous race: 2015 Fred's 250	NASCAR Camping World Truck Series; 2015 season	Next race: 2015 WinStar World Casino & Resort 350
