= 2016 Goody's Fast Relief 500 =

Race details
- Race 33 of 36 in the 2016 NASCAR Sprint Cup Series
- Date: October 30, 2016
- Location: Martinsville Speedway in Ridgeway, Virginia
- Course: Permanent racing facility
- Course length: .526 miles (.847 km)
- Distance: 500 laps, 263 mi (423.5 km)
- Average speed: 78.540 miles per hour (126.398 km/h)

Pole position
Driver	Martin Truex Jr.	Furniture Row Racing
- Time: 19.282

Most laps led
Driver	Matt Kenseth	Joe Gibbs Racing
- Laps: 176

Winner
No. 48	Jimmie Johnson	Hendrick Motorsports

Television in the United States
- Network: NBCSN
- Announcers: Rick Allen, Jeff Burton and Steve Letarte Guest Analyst Dale Earnhardt Jr.

Radio in the United States
- Radio: MRN
- Booth announcers: Joe Moore, Jeff Striegle and Rusty Wallace
- Turn announcers: Dave Moody (Backstretch)

The 2016 Goody's Fast Relief 500 was a NASCAR Sprint Cup Series race that was held on October 30, 2016, at Martinsville Speedway in Ridgeway, Virginia. Contested over 500 laps on the .526 mile (.847 km) short track, it was the 33rd race of the 2016 NASCAR Sprint Cup Series season, seventh race of the Chase and first race of the Round of 8.

== Entry list ==
No.	Driver	Team	Manufacturer
1	Jamie McMurray	Chip Ganassi Racing	Chevrolet
2	Brad Keselowski	Team Penske	Ford
3	Austin Dillon	Richard Childress Racing	Chevrolet
4	Kevin Harvick	Stewart–Haas Racing	Chevrolet
5	Kasey Kahne	Hendrick Motorsports	Chevrolet
6	Trevor Bayne	Roush Fenway Racing	Ford
7	Regan Smith	Tommy Baldwin Racing	Chevrolet
10	Danica Patrick	Stewart–Haas Racing	Chevrolet
11	Denny Hamlin	Joe Gibbs Racing	Toyota
13	Casey Mears	Germain Racing	Chevrolet
14	Tony Stewart	Stewart–Haas Racing	Chevrolet
15	Clint Bowyer	HScott Motorsports	Chevrolet
16	Greg Biffle	Roush Fenway Racing	Ford
17	Ricky Stenhouse Jr.	Roush Fenway Racing	Ford
18	Kyle Busch	Joe Gibbs Racing	Toyota
19	Carl Edwards	Joe Gibbs Racing	Toyota
20	Matt Kenseth	Joe Gibbs Racing	Toyota
21	Ryan Blaney (R)	Wood Brothers Racing	Ford
22	Joey Logano	Team Penske	Ford
23	David Ragan	BK Racing	Toyota
24	Chase Elliott (R)	Hendrick Motorsports	Chevrolet
27	Paul Menard	Richard Childress Racing	Chevrolet
30	Gray Gaulding	The Motorsports Group	Chevrolet
31	Ryan Newman	Richard Childress Racing	Chevrolet
32	Jeffrey Earnhardt (R)	Go FAS Racing	Ford
34	Chris Buescher (R)	Front Row Motorsports	Ford
38	Landon Cassill	Front Row Motorsports	Ford
41	Kurt Busch	Stewart–Haas Racing	Chevrolet
42	Kyle Larson	Chip Ganassi Racing	Chevrolet
43	Aric Almirola	Richard Petty Motorsports	Ford
44	Brian Scott (R)	Richard Petty Motorsports	Ford
46	Michael Annett	HScott Motorsports	Chevrolet
47	A. J. Allmendinger	JTG Daugherty Racing	Chevrolet
48	Jimmie Johnson	Hendrick Motorsports	Chevrolet
55	Reed Sorenson	Premium Motorsports	Chevrolet
78	Martin Truex Jr.	Furniture Row Racing	Toyota
83	Dylan Lupton (i)	BK Racing	Toyota
88	Jeff Gordon	Hendrick Motorsports	Chevrolet
93	Matt DiBenedetto	BK Racing	Toyota
95	Michael McDowell	Circle Sport – Leavine Family Racing	Chevrolet
Official entry list

== Practice ==
=== First practice ===
Kyle Larson was the fastest in the first practice session with a time of 19.289 and a speed of 98.170 mph (157.989 km/h).

Pos	No.	Driver	Team	Manufacturer	Time	Speed
1	42	Kyle Larson	Chip Ganassi Racing	Chevrolet	19.289	98.170
2	11	Denny Hamlin	Joe Gibbs Racing	Toyota	19.311	98.058
3	22	Joey Logano	Team Penske	Ford	19.312	98.053
Official first practice results

=== Second practice ===
Jamie McMurray was the fastest in the second practice session with a time of 19.566 and a speed of 96.780 mph (155.752 km/h).

Pos	No.	Driver	Team	Manufacturer	Time	Speed
1	1	Jamie McMurray	Chip Ganassi Racing	Chevrolet	19.566	96.780
2	22	Joey Logano	Team Penske	Ford	19.575	96.736
3	23	David Ragan	BK Racing	Toyota	19.588	96.671
Official second practice results

=== Final practice ===
Kyle Larson was the fastest in the final practice session with a time of 19.707 and a speed of 96.088 mph (154.639 km/h).

Pos	No.	Driver	Team	Manufacturer	Time	Speed
1	42	Kyle Larson	Chip Ganassi Racing	Chevrolet	19.707	96.088
2	14	Tony Stewart	Stewart–Haas Racing	Chevrolet	19.721	96.020
3	27	Paul Menard	Richard Childress Racing	Chevrolet	19.757	95.845
Official final practice results

== Qualifying ==
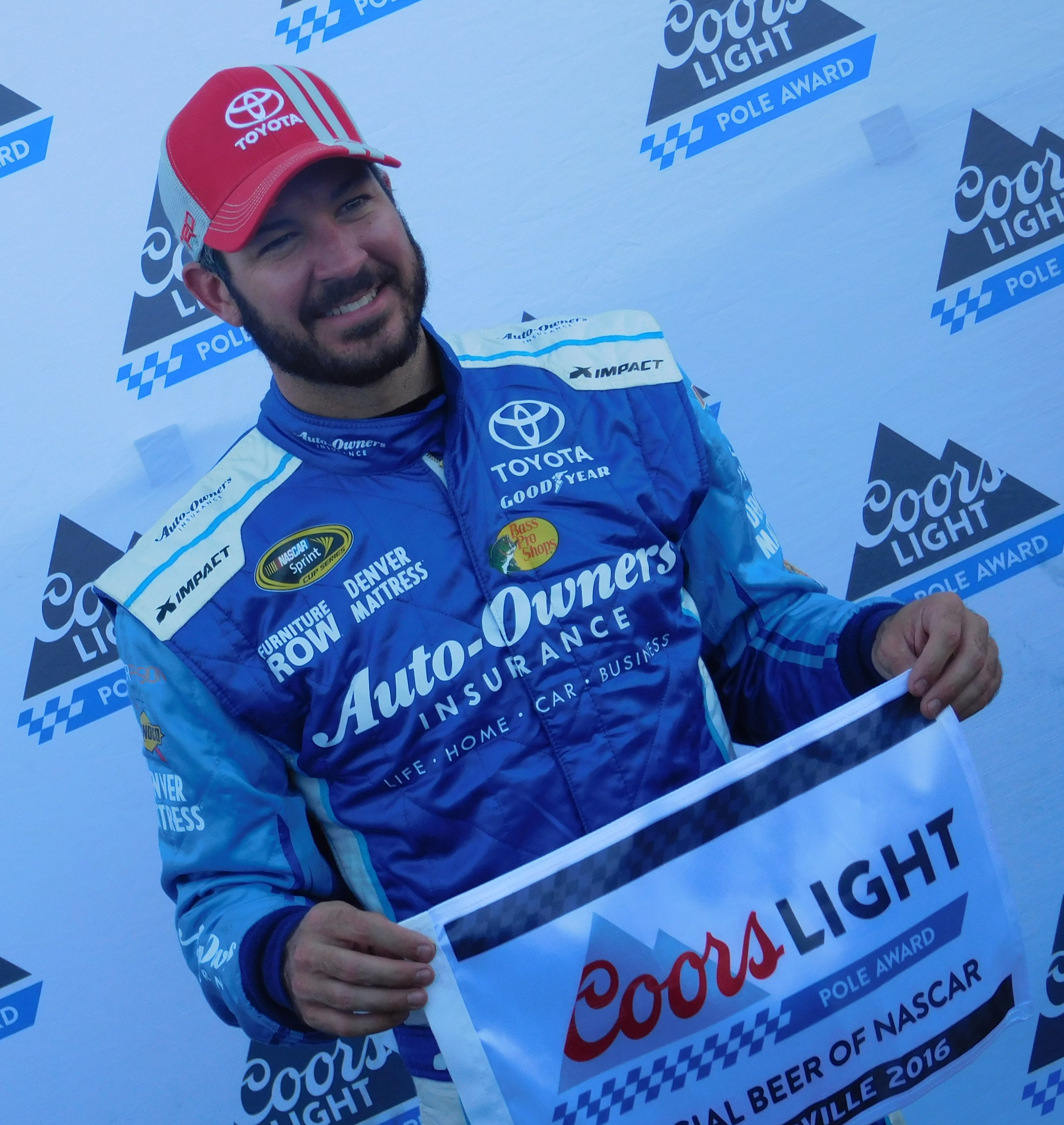
Martin Truex Jr. scored the pole position.

Martin Truex Jr. scored the pole for the race with a time of 19.282 and a speed of 98.206 mph (158.047 km/h). He said afterwards that Martinsville "is just so tough, and that first pit stall is just so critical to having a shot at winning here. I would love to get my first grandfather clock (the winner’s trophy). After last week, this helps a little bit. All in all, just proud of the guys for coming here with a game plan and executing. It's no guarantee that we'll race well on Sunday, but it's definitely a nice advantage if you have a good race car to be able to make up spots on pit road and not have to worry about getting blocked in and all those things. It's a definite advantage, and hopefully we can have a good car to take advantage of it."

Joey Logano, who qualified second, said he came so very "close to getting that fourth pole in a row. It would have been pretty cool to be able to say you did that, but it’s been a great streak.”

Ricky Stenhouse Jr. – who "wheel-hopped" going into turn 1, spun out, damaged the car and rolled out his backup – said there was "a lot of wheel-hop. It was definitely not ideal in qualifying, but you're always pressing the issue to try to qualify better and trying to get everything out of the car that you can and it just started wheel-hopping. As a lot of us drivers know, once it starts wheel-hopping it's hard to save. I down-shifted to try and keep it out of the wall as best I could, but we weren't able to do that. We'll get this Fastenal back-up out and get to work on it tonight and make sure that we have it ready to go for practice tomorrow.”

=== Qualifying results ===
Pos	No.	Driver	Team	Manufacturer	R1	R2	R3
1	78	Martin Truex Jr.	Furniture Row Racing	Toyota	19.365	19.298	19.282
2	22	Joey Logano	Team Penske	Ford	19.259	19.379	19.290
3	48	Jimmie Johnson	Hendrick Motorsports	Chevrolet	19.414	19.385	19.354
4	47	A. J. Allmendinger	JTG Daugherty Racing	Chevrolet	19.397	19.419	19.376
5	24	Chase Elliott (R)	Hendrick Motorsports	Chevrolet	19.380	19.297	19.382
6	14	Tony Stewart	Stewart–Haas Racing	Chevrolet	19.294	19.320	19.385
7	19	Carl Edwards	Joe Gibbs Racing	Toyota	19.445	19.397	19.399
8	11	Denny Hamlin	Joe Gibbs Racing	Toyota	19.374	19.431	19.418
9	18	Kyle Busch	Joe Gibbs Racing	Toyota	19.387	19.300	19.420
10	88	Jeff Gordon	Hendrick Motorsports	Chevrolet	19.390	19.379	19.436
11	42	Kyle Larson	Chip Ganassi Racing	Chevrolet	19.480	19.364	19.541
12	23	David Ragan	BK Racing	Toyota	19.475	19.423	19.556
13	31	Ryan Newman	Richard Childress Racing	Chevrolet	19.447	19.437	
14	1	Jamie McMurray	Chip Ganassi Racing	Chevrolet	19.408	19.447	
15	21	Ryan Blaney (R)	Wood Brothers Racing	Ford	19.390	19.463	
16	43	Aric Almirola	Richard Petty Motorsports	Ford	19.494	19.463	
17	20	Matt Kenseth	Joe Gibbs Racing	Toyota	19.456	19.477	
18	27	Paul Menard	Richard Childress Racing	Chevrolet	19.490	19.487	
19	2	Brad Keselowski	Team Penske	Ford	19.453	19.507	
20	4	Kevin Harvick	Stewart–Haas Racing	Chevrolet	19.463	19.512	
21	7	Regan Smith	Tommy Baldwin Racing	Chevrolet	19.507	19.512	
22	5	Kasey Kahne	Hendrick Motorsports	Chevrolet	19.486	19.520	
23	41	Kurt Busch	Stewart–Haas Racing	Chevrolet	19.505	19.528	
24	10	Danica Patrick	Stewart–Haas Racing	Chevrolet	19.481	19.539	
25	16	Greg Biffle	Roush Fenway Racing	Ford	19.510		
26	13	Casey Mears	Germain Racing	Chevrolet	19.520		
27	93	Matt DiBenedetto	BK Racing	Toyota	19.520		
28	15	Clint Bowyer	HScott Motorsports	Chevrolet	19.558		
29	34	Chris Buescher (R)	Front Row Motorsports	Ford	19.589		
30	95	Michael McDowell	Circle Sport – Leavine Family Racing	Chevrolet	19.591		
31	6	Trevor Bayne	Roush Fenway Racing	Ford	19.608		
32	3	Austin Dillon	Richard Childress Racing	Chevrolet	19.616		
33	38	Landon Cassill	Front Row Motorsports	Ford	19.788		
34	55	Reed Sorenson	Premium Motorsports	Chevrolet	19.853		
35	44	Brian Scott (R)	Richard Petty Motorsports	Ford	19.871		
36	30	Gray Gaulding	The Motorsports Group	Chevrolet	19.902		
37	83	Dylan Lupton (i)	BK Racing	Toyota	19.976		
38	32	Jeffrey Earnhardt (R)	Go FAS Racing	Ford	20.028		
39	17	Ricky Stenhouse Jr.	Roush Fenway Racing	Ford	20.362		
40	46	Michael Annett	HScott Motorsports	Chevrolet	0.000		
Official qualifying results

== Race ==
=== First half ===
Under mostly cloudy Virginia skies, Martin Truex Jr. led the field to the green flag at 1:18 p.m. The first caution of the race flew on lap 22 after Ricky Stenhouse Jr. wheel-hopped and backed into the turn 3 wall. He went on to finish 40th. Joey Logano exited pit road first. Carl Edwards and Denny Hamlin were sent to the tail end of the field on the restart for speeding.

The race restarted on lap 28. Truex took the lead back from Logano on lap 45. The second caution flew on lap 61 for David Ragan laying fluid down on the track.

The race restarted on lap 68. Kyle Larson took the lead for six laps on lap 73 before Truex took it back on lap 79. Kyle Busch took the lead on lap 113 before giving it back to Truex the following lap. Debris in turn 4 brought out the third caution on lap 132. Kevin Harvick was sent to the tail end of the field for speeding.

The race restarted on lap 139. Matt Kenseth took the lead for a circuit on lap 152 before Truex took back over the following lap. He continued to hold it until Kenseth took it from him for good on lap 180. Racing for second, Hamlin made contact with Jimmie Johnson by bumping him out of the way rounding turns 3 and 4 before continuing on lap 198. In his post-race media availability, Hamlin explained his bump on Johnson by saying how they "were racing for 13th or something at New Hampshire and he turned us, luckily I saved it. [He] [n]early wrecked us there. I raced him hard for the lead at Charlotte and then we come here and I catch him from a really long ways back. They didn’t want to let us go. It was frustrating from my standpoint, so I had to move him out of the way. I gave him many warnings on the radio.’’ Johnson said afterwards in his availability that he was "puzzled that he had to move me like he did,” Johnson said. “I prefer to race people cleanly. I got accused of racing hard? I'll take that as a compliment.” Debris on the backstretch, a torn banner, brought out the fourth caution on lap 200.

=== Second half ===
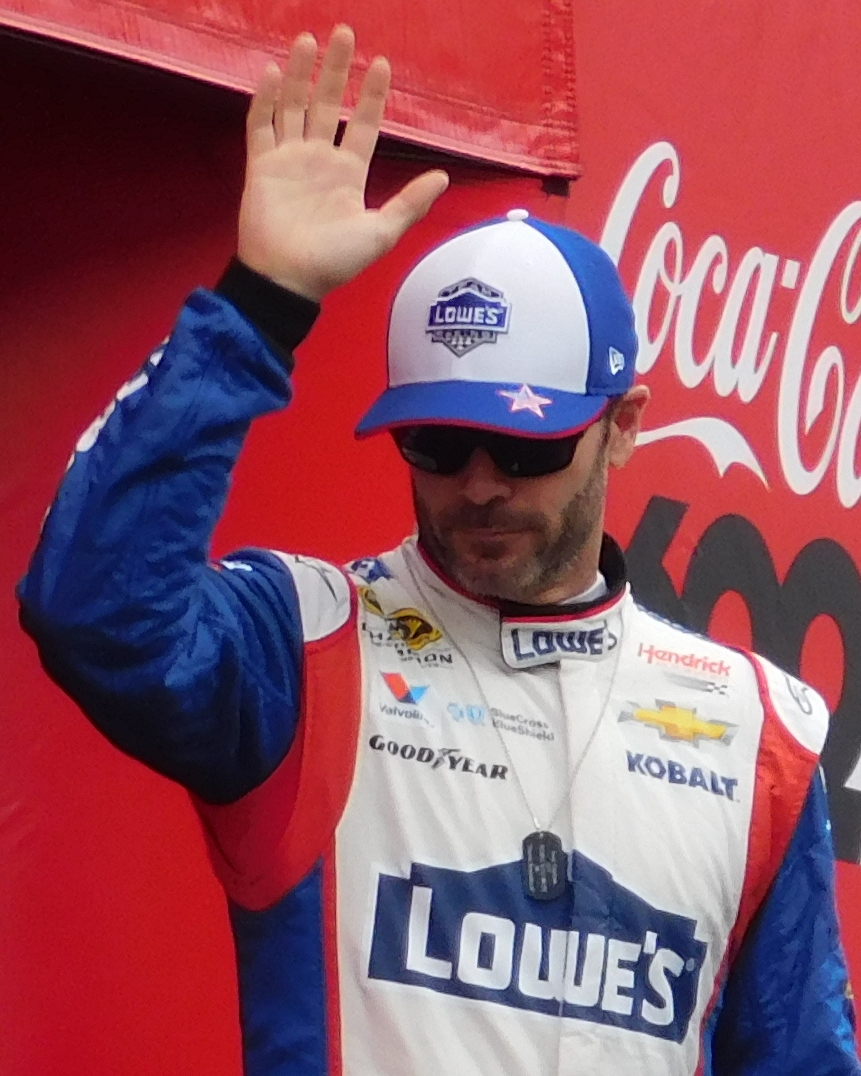
Jimmie Johnson won the race.

The race restarted on lap 207. It ran the length of a full fuel run, which is rare at Martinsville, and a number of cars pitted under green, also rare at Martinsville, when Edwards cut a tire, slammed the wall in turn and brought out the fifth caution with 142 laps to go. He said afterwards that Goodyear had "come down here, look at the tire, and said it was a belt failure," Edwards said. "So that’s really big of them to say, 'Hey, there’s nothing you could have done about it.' We had a really good race going and sometimes that’s just what happens in racing." Hamlin was sorted out as the leader. Because this happened during a cycle of green flag stops, it caused a number of cars to be in the wrong order when the race was scheduled to restart with 127 to go. There was controversy with race control taking so long to sort out the running order and for allowing so many laps to click off (29 total under the caution period) instead of throwing the red flag and sorting the running order. “We don't need 100 laps under yellow ... trying to figure out where they're at. It probably cost us the race," said Keselowski after the race. Following the race, Sprint Cup Series Managing Director Richard Buck said what happened "was a very dynamic situation; it was unique, as you saw. We were right in the middle of green flag pit stops and we had to go to a caution. That presents one set of issues that we deal with and then from that point as it moved along and we started to get the lineup as we normally do, it went to another dynamic when we had the leader run out of fuel. ... We understand the stakes of the Chase. They're extremely high for everybody. Our job is to get it right. We've got a tremendous amount of resources up there (in the tower). We then moved into another dynamic of it, the wave-arounds. We took our time to make sure we got it right; we feel confident that we got it right."

The race eventually restarted with 114 to go. After two laps of side-by-side racing, Johnson passed Hamlin exiting turn 2 to take the lead with 91 to go. Keselowski worked his way past Busch, Kenseth and Hamlin to move into second, but ran out of time to run down Johnson who drove on to score the victory.

== Post-race ==
=== Driver comments ===
Johnson said in victory lane that "there were a lot of moments but anything in life you have to work for it. It's not going to come easy and we knew that coming into this race. There are so many challenges with this track. I'm so thankful for this race team. To win on this weekend at this track with the tragedy we had in ’04, we’re thinking of all the loved ones that we lost in the plane crash.”

Keselowski, who finished runner-up, said his race "was a good day for us, not the win. I think we had the speed capable to pull it off, but still a really strong day. The car was good. The team executed really well, we just kind of missed out on the racing Gods today. We have a lot to be proud of, a great effort, and showed that we’re still a strong team if not the strongest in the garage and I’m really proud of that.”

Finishing third, Hamlin said his day was solid, "but obviously not what we were looking for. I knew when they called it that I sped. It wasn't like I was rolling too fast, it was exiting my pit box. I got jammed up by whoever was in front of me, there were cars on the outside and I was trying to gas to get clear of them and then back off. With these shorter sections I didn't have time to get it back.”

Finishing fourth, Kenseth said he "had a good day, not a great day. The guy doing a great day is the guy doing a burnout. We had a great car, we just got a caution when we didn’t need one – we were on pit road and then at the end when we needed a caution, I saw a car hit the wall and a car smoking so I was hoping to get another yellow and get a shot at it, but just didn’t get it.”

"You can't wreck each other and that's all there is to it I guess. We worked so good together that we gave the 48 car the win today,” a frustrated Busch said. "We had a great M&M’s Camry and we could have been a little farther up front, but we were held up there and we couldn’t pass and if I did try to make moves or try to make a pass, I got cutoff.”

Jeff Gordon, who finished sixth in his final substitute ride in the No. 88 car, said that "like Homestead, you don't really know how special some of those moments are until years down the road. Maybe that's just my personality when I can reflect on it, go back through my career. This has really done a lot for me integrating into the team and the organization. ... It's memorable, certainly. It's ironic this is the last one."

== Race results ==
Pos	No.	Driver	Team	Manufacturer	Laps	Points
1	48	Jimmie Johnson	Hendrick Motorsports	Chevrolet	500	44
2	2	Brad Keselowski	Team Penske	Ford	500	39
3	11	Denny Hamlin	Joe Gibbs Racing	Toyota	500	39
4	20	Matt Kenseth	Joe Gibbs Racing	Toyota	500	38
5	18	Kyle Busch	Joe Gibbs Racing	Toyota	500	37
6	88	Jeff Gordon	Hendrick Motorsports	Chevrolet	500	36
7	78	Martin Truex Jr.	Furniture Row Racing	Toyota	500	35
8	1	Jamie McMurray	Chip Ganassi Racing	Chevrolet	500	33
9	22	Joey Logano	Team Penske	Ford	500	33
10	47	A. J. Allmendinger	JTG Daugherty Racing	Chevrolet	500	32
11	5	Kasey Kahne	Hendrick Motorsports	Chevrolet	499	30
12	24	Chase Elliott (R)	Hendrick Motorsports	Chevrolet	499	29
13	16	Greg Biffle	Roush Fenway Racing	Ford	499	28
14	42	Kyle Larson	Chip Ganassi Racing	Chevrolet	499	28
15	43	Aric Almirola	Richard Petty Motorsports	Ford	499	26
16	31	Ryan Newman	Richard Childress Racing	Chevrolet	499	25
17	3	Austin Dillon	Richard Childress Racing	Chevrolet	499	24
18	95	Michael McDowell	Circle Sport – Leavine Family Racing	Chevrolet	498	23
19	21	Ryan Blaney (R)	Wood Brothers Racing	Ford	498	22
20	4	Kevin Harvick	Stewart–Haas Racing	Chevrolet	498	21
21	13	Casey Mears	Germain Racing	Chevrolet	497	20
22	41	Kurt Busch	Stewart–Haas Racing	Chevrolet	497	19
23	6	Trevor Bayne	Roush Fenway Racing	Ford	497	18
24	10	Danica Patrick	Stewart–Haas Racing	Chevrolet	497	17
25	27	Paul Menard	Richard Childress Racing	Chevrolet	496	16
26	14	Tony Stewart	Stewart–Haas Racing	Chevrolet	496	15
27	34	Chris Buescher (R)	Front Row Motorsports	Ford	495	14
28	15	Clint Bowyer	HScott Motorsports	Chevrolet	495	13
29	38	Landon Cassill	Front Row Motorsports	Ford	494	12
30	7	Regan Smith	Tommy Baldwin Racing	Chevrolet	494	11
31	83	Dylan Lupton (i)	BK Racing	Toyota	490	0
32	93	Matt DiBenedetto	BK Racing	Toyota	489	9
33	32	Jeffrey Earnhardt (R)	Go FAS Racing	Ford	486	8
34	44	Brian Scott (R)	Richard Petty Motorsports	Ford	484	7
35	46	Michael Annett	HScott Motorsports	Chevrolet	479	6
36	19	Carl Edwards	Joe Gibbs Racing	Toyota	477	5
37	23	David Ragan	BK Racing	Toyota	424	4
38	55	Reed Sorenson	Premium Motorsports	Chevrolet	407	3
39	30	Gray Gaulding	The Motorsports Group	Chevrolet	360	2
40	17	Ricky Stenhouse Jr.	Roush Fenway Racing	Ford	21	1
Official race results

=== Race summary ===
- Lead changes: 9 among different drivers
- Cautions/Laps: 5 for 54
- Red flags: 0
- Time of race: 3 hours, 20 minutes and 55 seconds
- Average speed: 78.540 miles per hour (126.398 km/h)

== Media ==
=== Television ===
NBCSN covered the race on the television side. Rick Allen, Jeff Burton and Steve Letarte called the race in the booth with a guest appearance by Dale Earnhardt Jr. Dave Burns, Mike Massaro, Marty Snider and Kelli Stavast handled pit road on the television side.

NBCSN
Booth announcers	Pit reporters
Lap-by-lap: Rick Allen; Color-commentator: Jeff Burton; Color-commentator: Steve Letarte; Guest Analyst: Dale Earnhardt Jr.	Dave Burns; Mike Massaro; Marty Snider; Kelli Stavast

=== Radio ===
MRN covered the radio call for the race, which was simulcast on Sirius XM NASCAR Radio.

MRN
Booth announcers	Turn announcers	Pit reporters
Lead announcer: Joe Moore; Announcer: Jeff Striegle; Announcer: Rusty Wallace	Backstretch: Dave Moody	Alex Hayden; Winston Kelley; Steve Post

== Standings after the race ==
Drivers' Championship standings

	Pos	Driver	Points
1	1	Jimmie Johnson	4,044
4	2	Denny Hamlin	4,039 (–5)
1	3	Matt Kenseth	4,039 (–5)
4	4	Kyle Busch	4,037 (–7)
4	5	Joey Logano	4,033 (–11)
3	6	Kevin Harvick	4,021 (–23)
	7	Kurt Busch	4,019 (–25)
3	8	Carl Edwards	4,005 (–39)
	9	Martin Truex Jr.	2,226 (–1,818)
	10	Brad Keselowski	2,207 (–1,837)
	11	Austin Dillon	2,187 (–1,857)
	12	Chase Elliott	2,185 (–1,859)
	13	Kyle Larson	2,183 (–1,861)
	14	Tony Stewart	2,156 (–1,888)
	15	Jamie McMurray	2,143 (–1,901)
	16	Chris Buescher	2,123 (–1,921)
Official driver's standings

Manufacturers' Championship standings

Pos	Manufacturer	Points
1	Toyota	1,359
2	Chevrolet	1,336 (–23)
3	Ford	1,266 (–93)
Official manufacturers' standing

- Note: Only the first 16 positions are included for the driver standings.

Previous race: 2016 Hellmann's 500	Sprint Cup Series; 2016 season	Next race: 2016 AAA Texas 500
