= Premium Motorsports =

American stock car racing team

- Owners: Rick Ware; Jay Robinson; Troy Stafford; Mark Bailey; Michael Sisk
- Base: Mooresville, North Carolina
- Series: NASCAR Cup Series
- Manufacturer: Chevrolet
- Opened: 2000
- Closed: 2020

Career
- Debut: Cup Series: 2012 Subway Fresh Fit 500 (Phoenix); Nationwide Series: 2000 Myrtle Beach 250 (Myrtle Beach); Camping World Truck Series: 2015 NextEra Energy Resources 250 (Daytona)
- Latest race: Cup Series: 2020 Season Finale 500 (Phoenix); Nationwide Series: 2011 Ford 300 (Homestead); Camping World Truck Series: 2018 Ford EcoBoost 200 (Homestead)
- Races competed: 1021
- Drivers' Championships: Total: 0 Cup Series: 0 Nationwide Series: 0 Camping World Truck Series: 0
- Race victories: Total: 0 Cup Series: 0 Nationwide Series: 0 Camping World Truck Series: 0
- Pole positions: Total: 0 Cup Series: 0 Nationwide Series: 0 Camping World Truck Series: 0

Premium Motorsports (formerly Jay Robinson Racing) was an American professional stock car racing team that competed in the NASCAR Cup Series. The team last fielded the No. 15 Chevrolet Camaro ZL1 LE full-time for Brennan Poole, and the No. 27 Camaro part-time for Reed Sorenson.

On May 13, 2020, Premium Motorsports was acquired by Rick Ware Racing.

== Cup Series ==
=== Car No. 7 history ===
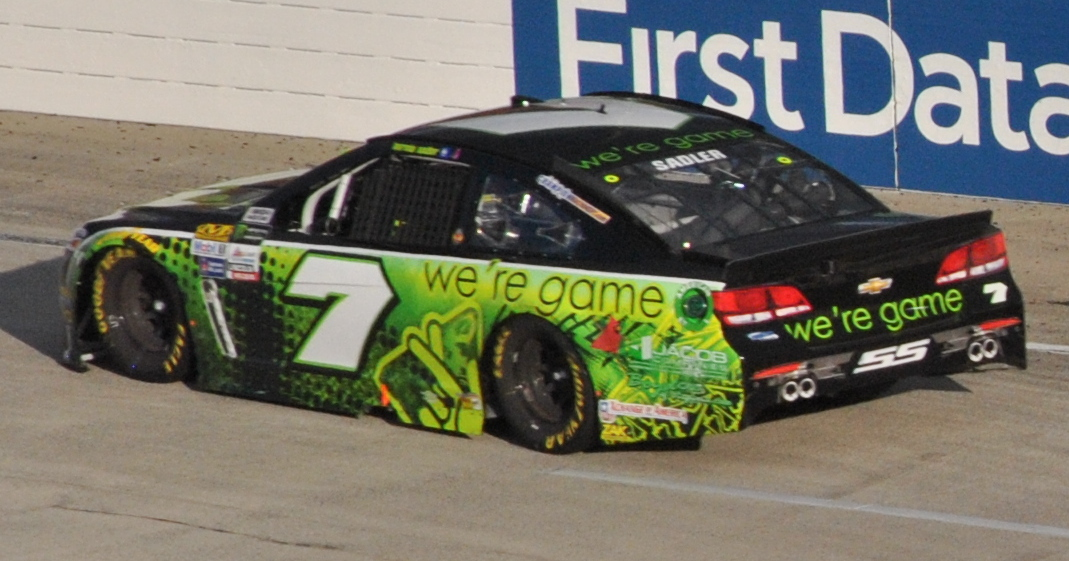
Hermie Sadler in the No. 7 at Martinsville Speedway in 2017

On September 21, 2017, Premium Motorsports' owner, Jay Robinson announced that he acquired all assets from Tommy Baldwin Racing. The acquisition included Baldwin's entire Cup Series inventory including everything from the team's race vehicles to their equipment. It also included the trucks that were leased by TBR to the No. 52 NASCAR Camping World Truck Series Team but Baldwin said there remained a few obligations from his No. 7 team to be fulfilled in future races. Justin Marks drove the car at Talladega, Hermie Sadler drove at Martinsville and Joey Gase drove at Texas and Phoenix.

On January 22, 2018, Danica Patrick was announced to drive the No. 7 in the Daytona 500 in her final NASCAR start. She brought sponsorship from her former sponsor, GoDaddy. The team fielded a car prepared by Richard Childress Racing, and used the charter that the No. 15 car used in 2017. Following the race, the charter went back to the No. 15. The No. 7 next appeared fielded by NY Racing Team in partnership with Premium Motorsports, originally supposed to be crew-chiefed by Brian Keselowski. However, Keselowski and a few other crew members declined to work under NY Racing owner John Cohen, and were dismissed from Premium before the 2018 Coca-Cola 600 the debut for the team. The No. 7 Steakhouse Elite Chevrolet would be driven by J. J. Yeley at Charlotte for the Coca-Cola 600 and Pocono for the Pocono 400. It was then fielded under the Premium Motorsports banner utilizing what had been the No. 55 crew. D. J. Kennington would be behind the wheel at Michigan, and Reed Sorenson was scheduled to drive at Sonoma but the team withdrew midweek and entered Chicagoland with Sorenson instead. Jeffrey Earnhardt was brought on for the next race at Daytona, bringing home an 11th-place finish in the crash filled race. Part-time Truck Series driver Jesse Little made his Cup Series debut at Kentucky with the team. The No. 7 team was closed down at year's end, with the 7 being assigned to NY Racing and Premium retaining their #15.

==== Car No. 7 results ====
Monster Energy NASCAR Cup Series results
Year	Driver	No.	Make	1	2	3	4	5	6	7	8	9	10	11	12	13	14	15	16	17	18	19	20	21	22	23	24	25	26	27	28	29	30	31	32	33	34	35	36	Owners	Pts
2018	Danica Patrick	7	Chevy	DAY; 35																																				35nd	2
2018	J. J. Yeley	7	Chevy		ATL	LVS	PHO	CAL	MAR	TEX	BRI	RCH	TAL	DOV	KAN	CLT	POC; 32										BRI; 32	DAR												38th	152
2018	D. J. Kennington	7	Chevy															MCH; 34	SON															TAL; 34				PHO; 27	HOM	38th	152
2018	Reed Sorenson	7	Chevy																	CHI; 32				POC; 32	GLN				IND; 28	LVS; 31	RCH				KAN; 36		TEX; 33			38th	152
2018	Jeffrey Earnhardt	7	Chevy																		DAY; 11																			38th	152
2018	Jesse Little	7	Chevy																			KEN; 35	NHA																	38th	152
2018	Garrett Smithley	7	Chevy																							MCH; 32														38th	152
2018	Ross Chastain	7	Chevy																													ROV; 24	DOV							38th	152
2018	Hermie Sadler	7	Chevy																																	MAR; 40				38th	152

=== Car No. 15 history ===
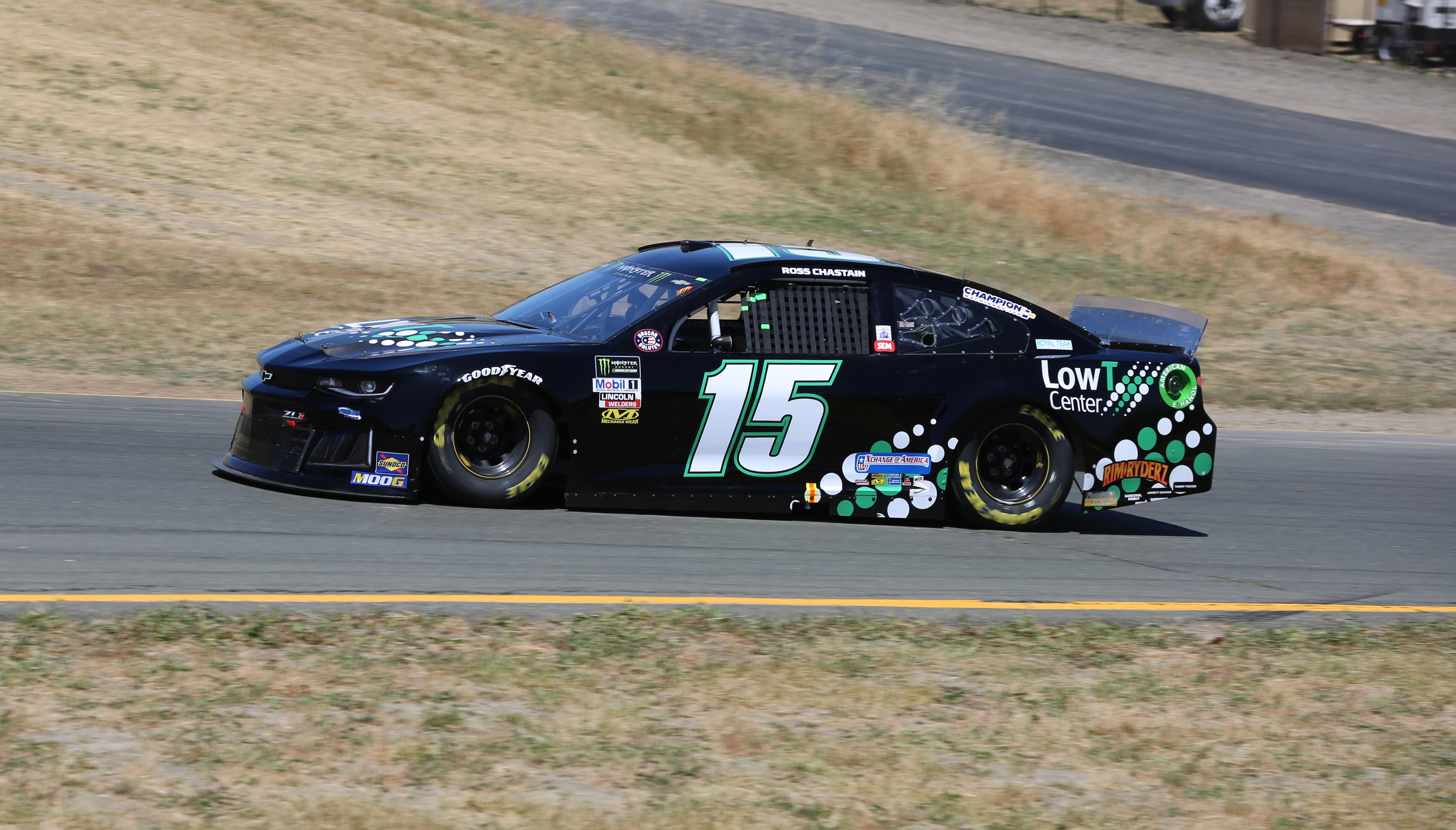
Ross Chastain's No. 15 Chevrolet at Sonoma in 2019

In 2017, Premium Motorsports bought the charter from the No. 15 HScott Motorsports team, and the car number was changed to No. 15 as a result. The team got a career-best 8th in Michael Waltrip's final race in the Daytona 500, able to avoid the carnage in the 2nd half of the race. After Daytona, Reed Sorenson went to the No. 15. At Talladega and Indianapolis Joey Gase drove the No. 15 finishing 21st and 25th respectively. At Dover, Ross Chastain made his Cup Series debut, where he finished 20th which is the team's best non-super-speedway finish. Road Course Ringer Kevin O'Connell drove the No. 15 at Sonoma finishing 33rd, Gray Gaulding drove the No. 15 in the 2017 Overton's 400. Derrike Cope drove the No. 15 at Michigan.

The No. 15 team returned in 2018 with Chastain driving at Atlanta. Chastain was to run every race in the No. 15 for the rest of the season. It was later announced that road course ringer Justin Marks would pilot the car at Sonoma and the Charlotte Roval with sponsorship from the Sufferfest Beer Company. This resulted in Chastain missing the Sonoma race, and driving the No. 7 at the Charlotte Roval.

Chastain returned to the team in 2019, running the full season. After running two laps down at one point, Chastain would earn his first top-ten finish in a wild Daytona race and finished 10th.

On November 27, 2019, NASCAR imposed penalties to Premium Motorsports, Rick Ware Racing, and Spire Motorsports for manipulating their finishing order at Homestead. Each team was docked 50 owners' points and fined US$50,000. In addition, competition directors Scott Eggleston of Premium Motorsports and Kenneth Evans of Rick Ware Racing were suspended indefinitely and fined US$25,000 each.

On December 11, 2019, it was announced that Brennan Poole would race full-time in the No. 15 for 2020.

Just three weeks into the season, rumors began circulating that Robinson was selling his team. Later, it was confirmed that Rick Ware Racing purchased Premium from Robinson.

==== Car No. 15 Results ====
NASCAR Cup Series results
Year	Driver	No.	Make	1	2	3	4	5	6	7	8	9	10	11	12	13	14	15	16	17	18	19	20	21	22	23	24	25	26	27	28	29	30	31	32	33	34	35	36	NCSC	Pts
2017	Michael Waltrip	15	Toyota	DAY; 8																																				34th	236
2017	Reed Sorenson	15	Chevy		ATL; 31		PHO; 30		MAR; 31	TEX; 35	BRI; 28	RCH; 33		KAN; 25	CLT; 30			MCH; 34			KEN; 28	NHA; 34					BRI; 38			CHI; 32	NHA; 28		CLT; 31		KAN; 25	MAR; 32	TEX; 31		HOM; 35	34th	236
2017	Reed Sorenson	15	Toyota			LVS; 31		CAL; 34									POC; 31											DAR; 39												34th	236
2017	Joey Gase	15	Toyota										TAL; 21																											34th	236
2017	Joey Gase	15	Chevy																				IND; 25																	34th	236
2017	Ross Chastain	15	Chevy													DOV; 20																DOV; 38								34th	236
2017	Kevin O'Connell	15	Chevy																SON; 33																					34th	236
2017	D. J. Kennington	15	Toyota																	DAY; 38																				34th	236
2017	D. J. Kennington	15	Chevy																																			PHO; 26		34th	236
2017	Gray Gaulding	15	Chevy																					POC; 31																34th	236
2017	Gary Klutt	15	Chevy																						GLN; 31															34th	236
2017	Derrike Cope	15	Toyota																							MCH; 39														34th	236
2017	Derrike Cope	15	Chevy																										RCH; 36											34th	236
2017	Mark Thompson	15	Chevy																															TAL; 39						34th	236
2018	Ross Chastain	15	Chevy		ATL; 30	LVS; 29	PHO; 27	CAL; 29	MAR; 29	TEX; 18	BRI; 39	RCH; 28	TAL; 25	DOV; 28	KAN; 26	CLT; 24	POC; 28	MCH; 26		CHI; 30	DAY; 21	KEN; 28	NHA; 25	POC; 35	GLN; 32	MCH; 35	BRI; 26	DAR; 28	IND; 26	LVS; 20	RCH; 33		DOV; 37	TAL; 24	KAN; 39	MAR; 29	TEX; 32	PHO; 24	HOM; 33	32nd	306
2018	Justin Marks	15	Chevy																SON; 28													CLT; 27								32nd	306
2019	Ross Chastain	15	Chevy	DAY; 10	ATL; 31	LVS; 33	PHO; 27	CAL; 28	MAR; 34	TEX; 29	BRI; 29	RCH; 30	TAL; 26	DOV; 30	KAN; 31	CLT; 36	POC; 24		SON; 33	CHI; 26		KEN; 31	NHA; 25	POC; 30	GLN; 27	MCH; 29	BRI; 26	DAR; 28	IND; 22	LVS; 31	RCH; 36	CLT; 22	DOV; 31	TAL; 12	KAN; 27	MAR; 29		PHO; 28		33rd	260
2019	Garrett Smithley	15	Chevy															MCH; 30																						33rd	260
2019	Quin Houff	15	Chevy																		DAY; 37																			33rd	260
2019	Joe Nemechek	15	Chevy																																		TEX; 29		HOM; 38	33rd	260
2020	Brennan Poole	15	Chevy	DAY; 16	LVS; 29	CAL; 32	PHO; 31	DAR; 27	DAR; 37	CLT; 30	CLT; 38	BRI; 24	ATL; 30	MAR; 30	HOM; 32	TAL; 35	POC; 29	POC; 27	IND; 35	KEN; 31	TEX; 27	KAN; 30	NHA; 27	MCH; 37	MCH; 30	DAY; 28	DOV; 36	DOV; 30	DAY; 15	DAR; 28	RCH; 33		LVS; 30	TAL; 9	CLT; 37	KAN; 28	TEX; 28	MAR; 37	PHO; 29	32nd	276
2020	J. J. Yeley	15	Chevy																													BRI; 30								32nd	276

=== Car No. 27 history ===
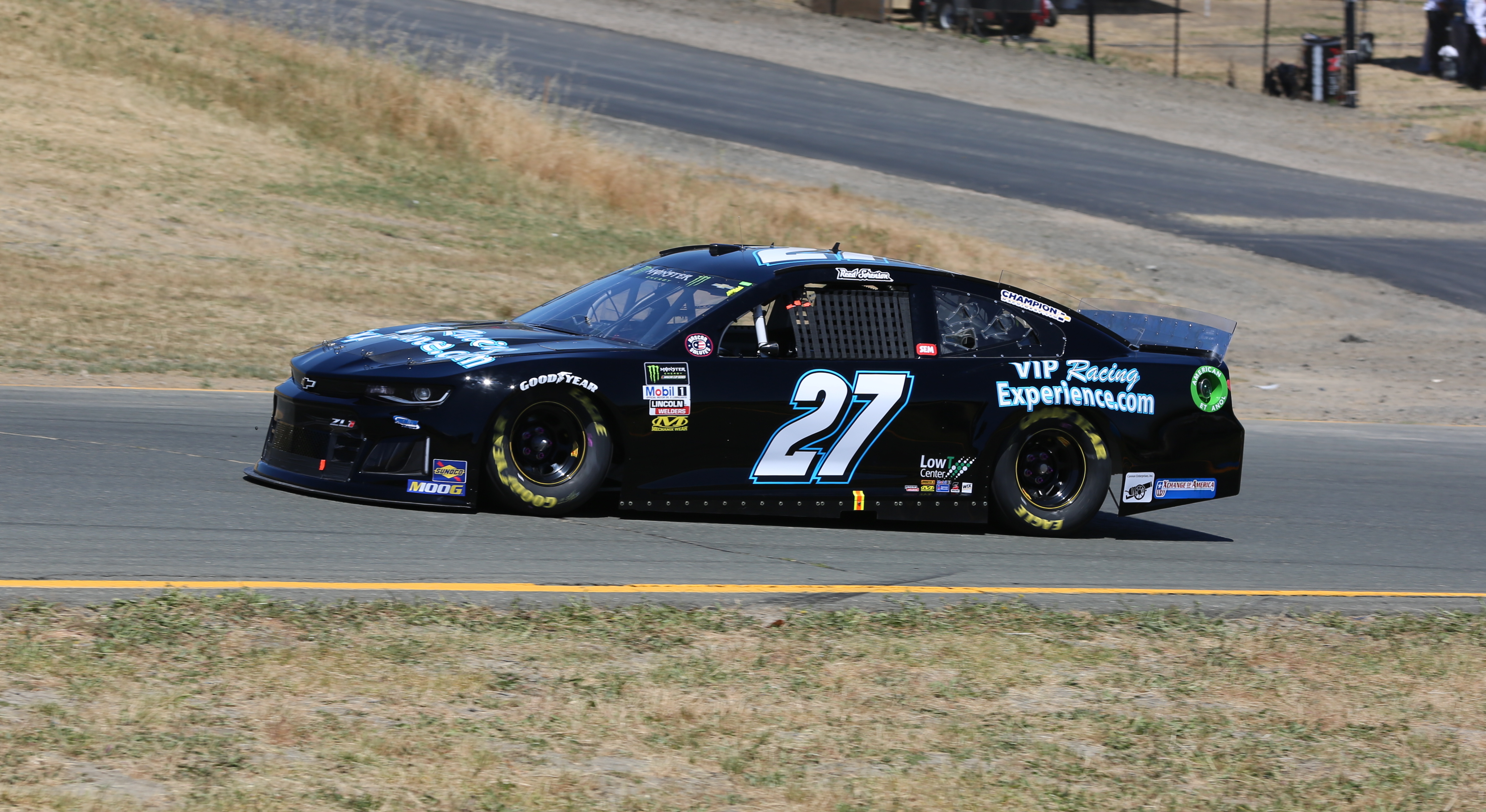
Reed Sorenson's No. 27 Chevrolet at Sonoma in 2019

At the 2019 Daytona 500, Casey Mears drove a No. 27 Chevy Camaro ZL1 that was built and crewed by Premium, but entered as a Germain Racing entry. Pat Tryson was the crew chief. This was Mears's first Cup start since 2016. The No. 27 was next entered at Auto Club Speedway, this time as a Premium entry driven by Reed Sorenson with Tommy Baldwin as crew chief.

Reed Sorenson made the starting lineup of the 2020 Daytona 500 after finishing 18th in Duel 1 of the 2020 Bluegreen Vacations Duels.

==== Car No. 27 results ====
NASCAR Cup Series results
Year	Driver	No.	Make	1	2	3	4	5	6	7	8	9	10	11	12	13	14	15	16	17	18	19	20	21	22	23	24	25	26	27	28	29	30	31	32	33	34	35	36	Owners	Pts
2019	Reed Sorenson	27	Chevy	DAY	ATL	LVS	PHO	CAL; 34	MAR	TEX; 34	BRI	RCH	TAL; 18	DOV; 35	KAN; 35	CLT; 30	POC; 28	MCH	SON; 35	CHI; 34			NHA; 27	POC; 32	GLN									TAL; 22	KAN; 33	MAR; 33				37th	106
2019	Ross Chastain	27	Chevy																		DAY; 30	KEN															TEX; 31		HOM; 35	37th	106
2019	Quin Houff	27	Chevy																							MCH; 31	BRI; 30				RCH; 35									37th	106
2019	Joe Nemechek	27	Chevy																									DAR; 31		LVS; 34		ROV; 31	DOV; 30					PHO; 34		37th	106
2019	Ryan Sieg	27	Chevy																										IND; 24											37th	106
2020	Reed Sorenson	27	Chevy	DAY; 31	LVS	CAL	PHO	DAR	DAR	CLT	CLT	BRI	ATL	MAR	HOM	TAL	POC	POC	IND	KEN	TEX	KAN	NHA	MCH	MCH	DRC	DOV	DOV	DAY	DAR	RCH	BRI	LVS	TAL	ROV	KAN	TEX	MAR	PHO	43rd	6

=== Car No. 40 history ===
In 2016, Premium Motorsports purchased the Hillman Racing No. 40 team and brought Mike Hillman as competition director. Hillman and Robinson attempted to field the No. 40 CRC Industries Chevrolet in the 2016 Daytona 500 for Reed Sorenson but failed to qualify. The 40 did not make another attempt for 2016.

=== Car No. 49 history ===
In 2012, the team announced its intent to compete in the 2012 NASCAR Sprint Cup Series. The team planned to race the full series schedule, running Toyotas, using the No. 49. J. J. Yeley and Tony Furr served as the driver and crew chief, respectively. The team had sponsorship for the Daytona 500 from America-Israel Racing, in order to educate people about Israel. One of the sponsors said that "being brought up Southern Baptist, I was always taught we stand behind Israel. This is a way I felt I could give back to society. It's something I believe in." Yeley also stated that JPO Absorbents will sponsor for about 8–10 races throughout the season. In its first outing, the team missed the field for the Daytona 500.

On October 22, 2012, the team sold off its Cup Series equipment in an auction to NEMCO Motorsports and Joe Nemechek, with Robinson becoming a partner in the renamed NEMCO-JRR Motorsports.

In October 2014, Mike Wallace, the regular driver for the Robinson-affiliated Identity Ventures Racing, ran the No. 49 Royal Teak Collection Toyota at Talladega.

==== Car No. 49 results ====
NASCAR Sprint Cup Series results
Year	Driver	No.	Make	1	2	3	4	5	6	7	8	9	10	11	12	13	14	15	16	17	18	19	20	21	22	23	24	25	26	27	28	29	30	31	32	33	34	35	36	Owners	Pts
2012	J. J. Yeley	49	Toyota	DAY; DNQ	PHO; 26	LVS; 43	BRI; 30	CAL; 35	MAR; 37	TEX; 33	KAN; 31	RCH; DNQ	TAL; DNQ	DAR; 37	CLT; DNQ	DOV; 34	POC; 36	MCH; 37	SON; 33	KEN; DNQ	DAY; 40	NHA; 43	IND	POC																42nd	150
2012	Jason Leffler	49	Toyota																						GLN; 35	MCH	BRI; 31	ATL; 38	RCH	CHI; DNQ	NHA; DNQ	DOV; DNQ	TAL	CLT	KAN	MAR	TEX	PHO	HOM	42nd	150
2014	Mike Wallace	49	Toyota	DAY	PHO	LVS	BRI	CAL	MAR	TEX	DAR	RCH	TAL	KAN	CLT	DOV	POC	MCH	SON	KEN	DAY	NHA	IND	POC	GLN	MCH	BRI	ATL	RCH	CHI	NHA	DOV	KAN	CLT	TAL; 38	MAR	TEX	PHO	HOM	50th	10

=== Car No. 51 History ===
At the 2018 Daytona 500, Justin Marks drove a No. 51 Chevy with Harry's Shave Club sponsoring. The points were leased from Rick Ware Racing.

=== Car No. 55 history ===
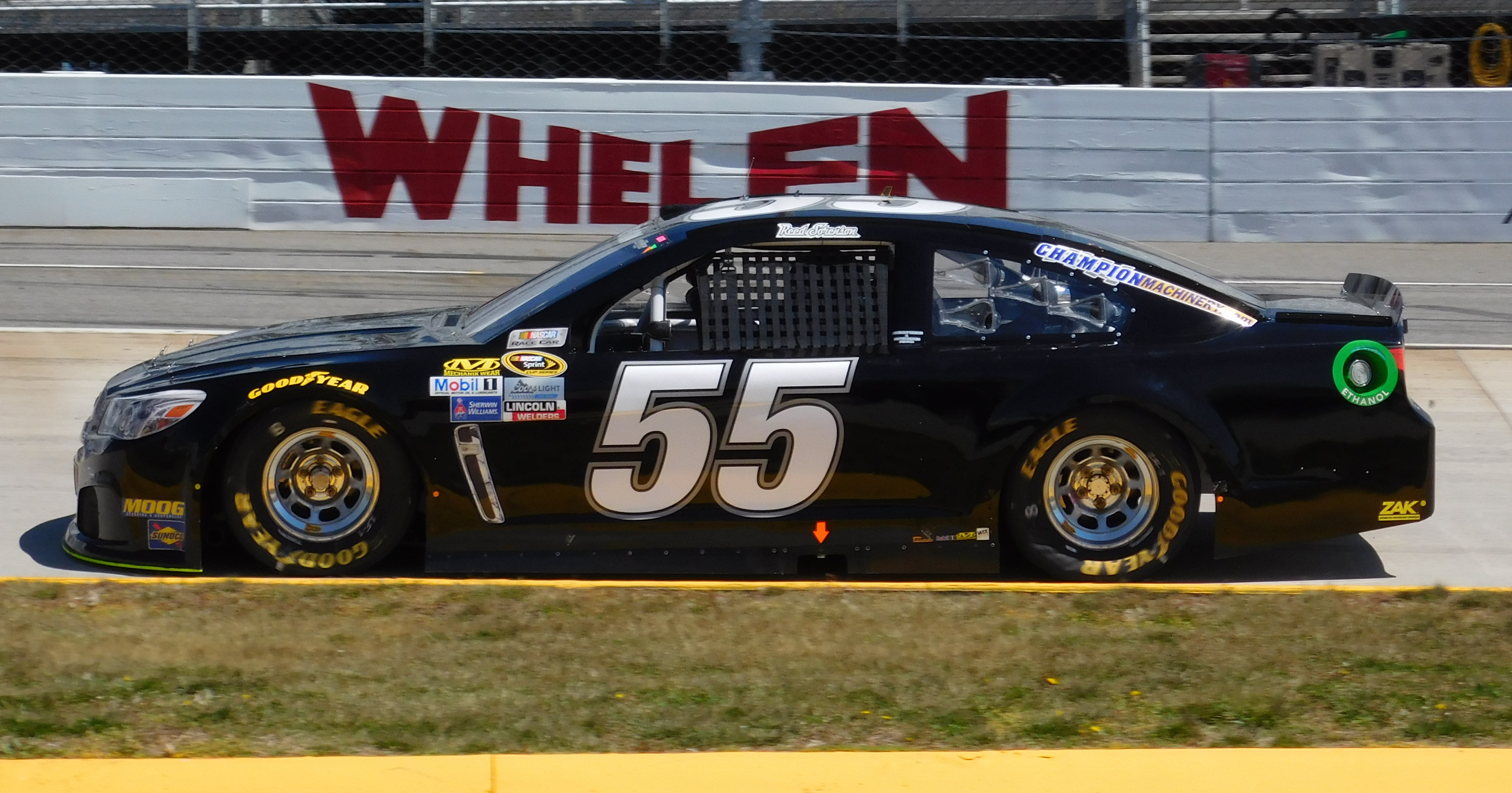
Reed Sorenson in the No. 55 at Martinsville Speedway in 2016

Mike Hillman, who was partnered with Joe Falk and his team was named as a partner for 2016, purchasing equipment from Hillman-Circle Sport LLC. The team returned in Martinsville for their 2016 debut. The number was changed from No. 62 to No. 55 with Reed Sorenson. The team made the race qualifying 40th out of 40 cars. The team would then make the races at both Texas and Bristol due to only 40 cars entered for both races, at Richmond there were 41 cars entered for the race but when qualifying was rained out and the field was set by practice speeds, the 55 team made the race due to being third fastest of the non-charter teams in practice. The 55 was driven by Michael Waltrip at Talladega; his 12th place would remain Robinson's best ever in Cup until the next restrictor plate race. Sorenson drove the next several races before being placed in the No. 98 starting at Pocono, with 98 driver Cole Whitt taking his place at this race and at Michigan, while Cody Ware drove at Sonoma; however, Ware failed to qualify. Sorenson returned at Daytona. Sorenson sat out Watkins Glen as well, with Alex Kennedy running the No. 55. The team has been forced to run many races without sponsorship; however, they did pick up PEAK Antifreeze for Talladega with Waltrip, the World Record Striper Company for Dover, the Sprint Showdown and the Coca-Cola 600 with Sorenson, long-time Robinson sponsor Vydox Plus at Pocono with Whitt, Carport Empire with Ware, and another longtime Robinson partner, Royal Teak Collection, with Sorenson at Daytona. In the second Talladega race, they surprised many by being the fastest in the first round of qualifying, then in the race, went to the garage at the opening laps to get the car ready for racing due to the car being impounded after qualifying.

The team got to a bad start in 2017, crashing out and not qualifying for the Daytona 500. After the Daytona 500, Derrike Cope came back to the Cup series to drive the No. 55, starting at Atlanta. The No. 55 team originally planned to run full-time, but skipped three races along the process.

The team made its 2018 season debut with driver Joey Gase driving the car at Las Vegas. Reed Sorenson returned to the No. 55 machine at Auto Club. After running 6 more races with Sorenson, one with J. J. Yeley at Martinsville and one with Jeffrey Earnhardt at the Coca-Cola 600, the 55 crew was moved to the No. 7 at Michigan with D. J. Kennington as driver.

==== Car No. 55 results ====
Monster Energy NASCAR Cup Series results
Year	Driver	No.	Make	1	2	3	4	5	6	7	8	9	10	11	12	13	14	15	16	17	18	19	20	21	22	23	24	25	26	27	28	29	30	31	32	33	34	35	36	Owners	Pts
2016	Reed Sorenson	55	Chevy	DAY	ATL	LVS	PHO	CAL	MAR; 37	TEX; 36	BRI; 40	RCH; 40		KAN; 33	DOV; 38	CLT; 40					KEN; 27	NHA; 35	IND; 33	POC; 40		BRI; 27	MCH; 36	DAR; 31	RCH; 26	CHI; 39			CLT; 28			MAR; 38				39th	237
2016	Reed Sorenson	55	Toyota																	DAY; 22											NHA; 36	DOV; 35			TAL; 37		TEX; 35		HOM; 32	39th	237
2016	Michael Waltrip	55	Toyota										TAL; 12																											39th	237
2016	Cole Whitt	55	Chevy														POC; 30	MCH; 27																KAN; 33						39th	237
2016	Cody Ware	55	Chevy																SON; DNQ																					39th	237
2016	Alex Kennedy	55	Chevy																						GLN; 36															39th	237
2016	D. J. Kennington	55	Chevy																																			PHO; 35		39th	237
2017	Reed Sorenson	55	Toyota	DAY; DNQ									TAL; 40							DAY; 30												DOV; 39								38th	99
2017	Reed Sorenson	55	Chevy																							MCH; 33			RCH; 30											38th	99
2017	Derrike Cope	55	Chevy		ATL; 36	LVS; 35	PHO; 33	CAL; 38	MAR								POC; 33	MCH																						38th	99
2017	Derrike Cope	55	Toyota							TEX; 37	BRI; 31	RCH		KAN; 39	CLT; 31	DOV								POC; 34	GLN			DAR; 32												38th	99
2017	Tommy Regan	55	Chevy																SON; 34																					38th	99
2017	Gray Gaulding	55	Toyota																		KEN; 35	NHA; 35								CHI; 38	NHA; 33		CLT; 36		KAN; 28	MAR	TEX	PHO	HOM	38th	99
2017	Gray Gaulding	55	Chevy																				IND; 24				BRI; 31													38th	99
2017	D. J. Kennington	55	Toyota																															TAL; 33						38th	99
2018	Joey Gase	55	Chevy	DAY	ATL	LVS; 32	PHO																																	38th	152
2018	Reed Sorenson	55	Chevy					CAL; 34		TEX; 31	BRI; 32	RCH; 38	TAL; 37	DOV; 32	KAN; 27																									38th	152
2018	J. J. Yeley	55	Chevy						MAR; 31																															38th	152
2018	Jeffrey Earnhardt	55	Chevy													CLT; 30	POC	MCH	SON	CHI	DAY	KEN	NHA	POC	GLN	MCH	BRI	DAR	IND	LVS	RCH	ROV	DOV	TAL	KAN	MAR	TEX	PHO	HOM	38th	152

=== Car No. 62 history ===
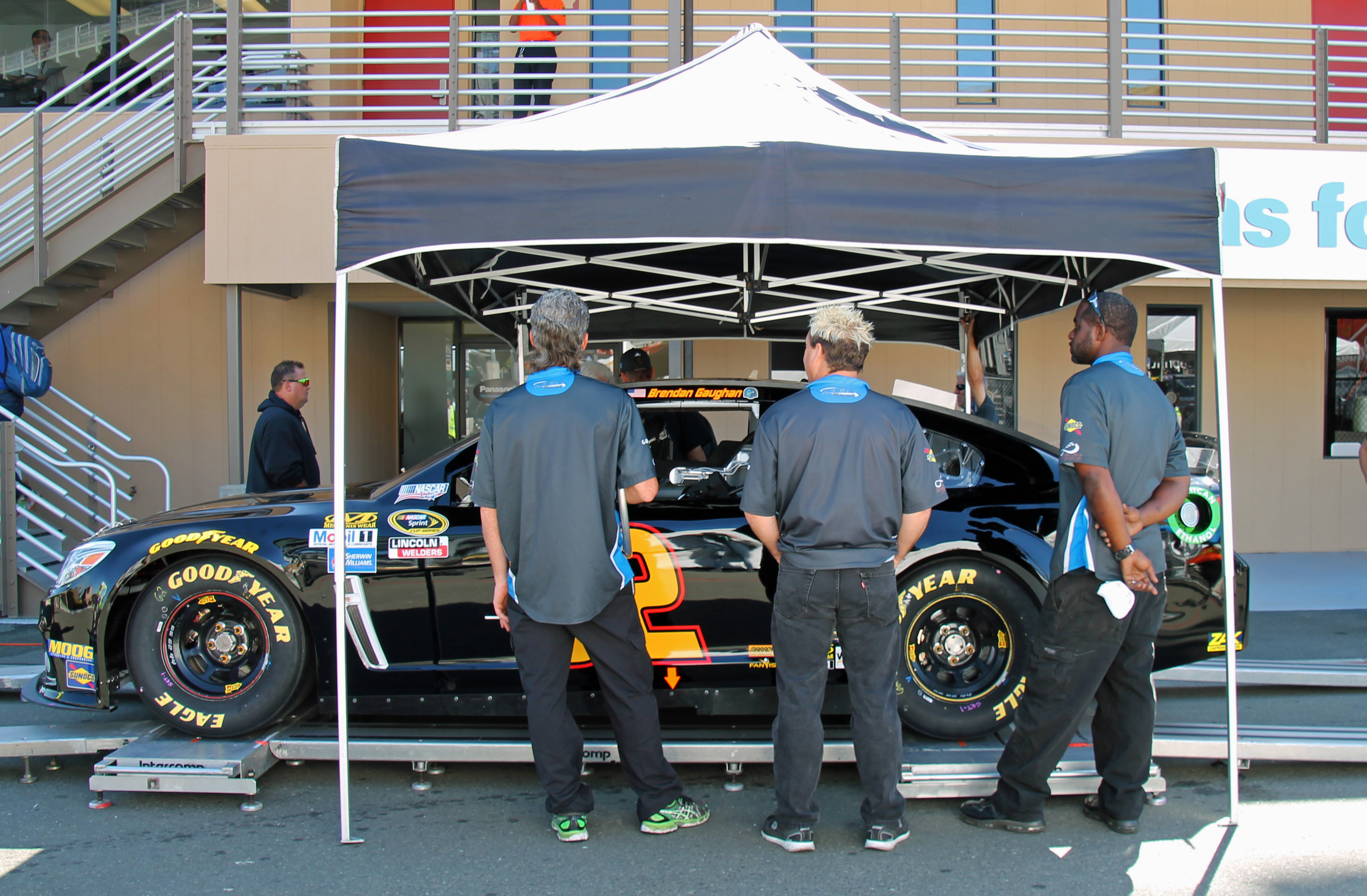
Brendan Gaughan's No. 62 car going through inspection at Sonoma in 2015.

In 2015, upon the team's return to the Cup Series full-time, Premium began fielding a second car, the No. 62 Chevrolet for Brian Scott and Brendan Gaughan and Reed Sorenson. 62 was the number Gaughan used for the majority of his racing career. The team used the owner's points and equipment of Tommy Baldwin Racing's former No. 36 team, sold to Robinson at the beginning of the year. The No. 62 had collaborative agreements with both TBR and Richard Childress Racing (both Scott and Gaughan were RCR drivers). Scott drove an RCR-prepared car at the Daytona 500 with family sponsor Shore Lodge but crashed in his Budweiser Duel and failed to qualify. Gaughan planned to take over for the rest of the season, though without direct RCR support. Gaughan qualified the next week in Atlanta, finishing 28th. Gaughan would subsequently qualify at Las Vegas, with South Point Hotel and Casino (owned by his father Michael) appearing on the car. Gaughan qualified for the next two races in an unsponsored entry.

However, the team then failed to qualify for the next four consecutive races, three of which were supposed to be fully sponsored. Gaughan finally qualified at Talladega with DiaThrive (who originally signed on at Martinsville) sponsoring, but blew a tire and crashed after 90 laps, finishing 40th. Gaughan failed to qualify for the fifth time at Kansas, and again the following race in Charlotte for the Coca-Cola 600. Gaughan was able to make the field at Dover, and made it to the end without incident, finishing 34th. Gaughan would also qualify at Pocono, due to the entry list having only 43 cars, but suffered electrical problems throughout the race and finished 40th. Gaughan failed to qualify at Michigan and Sonoma, but qualified at Daytona (due to cancellation of qualifying) with Vydox Plus (first signed on at Bristol) on the hood, and matched his season best 28th-place finish. After only qualifying for 8 of the first 16 races, and feeling like he could not give the effort to the team he wanted to, Gaughan left the team.

Reed Sorenson took over the No. 62 at Kentucky, which qualified for the second week in a row (due to another qualifying rainout) finishing in 36th place. Sorenson failed to qualify at New Hampshire and Indianapolis. Sorenson was reassigned to the No. 98 at Pocono, with Timmy Hill moving over to the No. 62 for this race, which ran as a Ford from the former Phil Parsons Racing stable. The 62 made the show due to the entry list having only 43 cars, and finished 36th. T. J. Bell was entered in the No. 62, once again a Chevy, at Watkins Glen, but failed to qualify. Sorenson returned to the No. 62, once again as a Ford, at Michigan, but failed to qualify again, and also failed to qualify at Bristol. Hill would return to the No. 62 at Darlington, but this time failed to qualify, and failed to qualify the next week at Richmond as well. The No. 62, with Hill, qualified for Chicagoland, snapping a five-race DNQ streak since Pocono, due to a third rained-out qualifying session. Hill finished 41st. Hill made the next race at New Hampshire as well, finishing 36th, and qualified for the third week in a row at Dover, due to the entry list having only 43 cars; he finished 39th. This three-race start streak was broken when Hill failed to qualify at Charlotte. He missed the race again at Kansas. Hill was able to qualify at Talladega, with Royal Teak Collection on the hood for the first time in 2015 (the company had sponsored several races on the No. 98); this was also just the second time the No. 62 had qualified on speed when all cars ran a lap (the first time was with Gaughan at the spring Talladega race). The car was plagued by electrical issues and finished 41st. Hill qualified at Martinsville, due to the entry list having only 43 cars. Due to Ryan Preece running the No. 98 at Texas, Sorenson returned to the No. 62, but posted the slowest speed and failed to qualify. Hill would run the car at Phoenix, making the field due to the entry list having only 43 cars, but suffered non-terminal engine problems and finished last. Sorenson ran the car at Homestead, but yet again posted the slowest speed and failed to qualify. The No. 62 missed 20 of 36 races and finished 2015 45th in the owners points, lowest among teams that attempted the full schedule and also behind the part-time No. 21 and No. 95 teams.

==== Car No. 62 results ====
NASCAR Sprint Cup Series results
Year	Driver	No.	Make	1	2	3	4	5	6	7	8	9	10	11	12	13	14	15	16	17	18	19	20	21	22	23	24	25	26	27	28	29	30	31	32	33	34	35	36	Owners	Pts
2015	Brian Scott	62	Chevy	DAY; DNQ																																				45th	111
2015	Brendan Gaughan	62	Chevy		ATL; 28	LVS; 38	PHO; 37	CAL; 41	MAR; DNQ	TEX; DNQ	BRI; DNQ	RCH; DNQ	TAL; 40	KAN; DNQ	CLT; DNQ	DOV; 34	POC; 40	MCH; DNQ	SON; DNQ	DAY; 28																				45th	111
2015	Reed Sorenson	62	Chevy																		KEN; 36	NHA; DNQ	IND; DNQ				BRI; DNQ													45th	111
2015	Reed Sorenson	62	Ford																							MCH; DNQ														45th	111
2015	Reed Sorenson	62	Toyota																																		TEX; DNQ		HOM; DNQ	45th	111
2015	Timmy Hill	62	Ford																					POC; 36							NHA; 36				TAL; 41					45th	111
2015	Timmy Hill	62	Chevy																									DAR; DNQ	RCH; DNQ	CHI; 41		DOV; 39	CLT; DNQ	KAN; DNQ		MAR; 36		PHO; 43		45th	111
2015	T. J. Bell	62	Chevy																						GLN; DNQ															45th	111

=== Car No. 66 history ===
In 2014, Robinson was involved in a collaboration called Identity Ventures Racing, owned by James Hamilton and Mark Bailey, to field the No. 66 LandCastle Title/Royal Teak Toyota for a rotation of Toyota drivers as a Michael Waltrip Racing affiliate, a rotation which included Waltrip himself. Near the end of the season, Robinson took full control of the No. 66 after legal issues with principal partner Nat Hardwick.

In 2015, Robinson announced his plan to return to the Cup Series full-time out of his own shop for the first time since 2012, this time under the name Premium Motorsports. Robinson brought over the remaining equipment from Identity Ventures Racing, and also brought over the No. 66 and the associated owner points. The team's driver was announced as Mike Wallace. Wallace ran the Daytona 500 with Crazy Vapors and X8 Energy Gum sponsoring. Wallace raced his way into the Daytona 500, and finished 36th in the race. However, Wallace failed to qualify for the next two races. Wallace was then released in favor of Tanner Berryhill, who took over at Phoenix and applied to be a Rookie of the Year contender. Berryhill also failed to qualify in his only attempt. Wallace was placed on the entry list for Auto Club Speedway, but the team withdrew midweek, with Robinson announcing no current plans for a return due to the qualifying struggles and lack of sponsorship. The team didn't return again until the non-points-paying Sprint All-Star Race's Sprint Showdown with Berryhill. Berryhill failed to win either Showdown segment in the No. 66. The team was later merged with the No. 98.

==== Car No. 66 results ====
NASCAR Sprint Cup Series results
Year	Driver	No.	Make	1	2	3	4	5	6	7	8	9	10	11	12	13	14	15	16	17	18	19	20	21	22	23	24	25	26	27	28	29	30	31	32	33	34	35	36	Owners	Pts
2015	Mike Wallace	66	Toyota	DAY; 36																																				48th	8
2015	Mike Wallace	66	Chevy		ATL; DNQ	LVS; DNQ		CAL; Wth	MAR	TEX	BRI	RCH	TAL	KAN	CLT	DOV	POC	MCH	SON	DAY	KEN	NHA	IND	POC	GLN	MCH	BRI	DAR	RCH	CHI	NHA	DOV	CLT	KAN	TAL	MAR	TEX	PHO	HOM	48th	8
2015	Tanner Berryhill	66	Chevy				PHO; DNQ																																	48th	8

=== Car No. 98 history ===
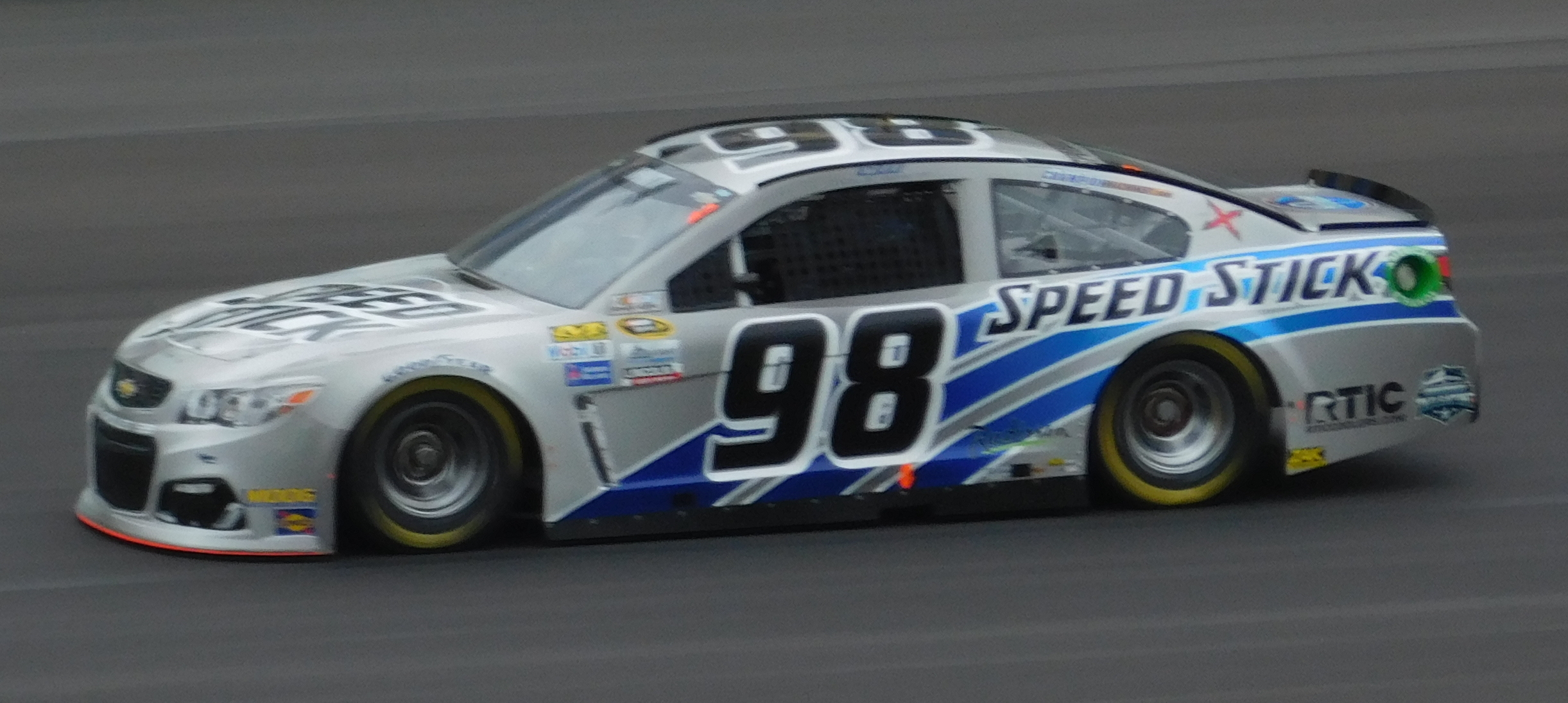
Cole Whitt's No. 98 at Kentucky Speedway in 2016

In early May 2015, it was reported that Phil Parsons Racing with Mike Curb would be selling their No. 98 team driven by Josh Wise to Premium owner Jay Robinson. Evidence for the change in ownership included the removal of the logos of PPR sponsor Phoenix Construction (owned by former team owner James Finch) from the car prior to the GEICO 500 at Talladega, replaced with Premium sponsor Royal Teak Collections. The ownership change was announced on May 5, the Monday after the race, on the team's Twitter. Premium Motorsports officially took over the No. 98 team at the Coca-Cola 600 at Charlotte, with Royal Teak once again sponsoring the car, and Wise remaining as the driver. Dogecoin returned to the 98 car at Sonoma, where the team ran a Chevrolet. Big Red Soda signed on as sponsor for four races beginning at Kentucky in July, where Wise was taken out early in a crash, finishing 43rd. Wise announced the following week that he had left Premium Motorsports, due to differences in opinion about the direction the team was going in comparison to Phil Parsons Racing. This was the second driver that left the team in a span of three days after Brendan Gaughan announced his departure Friday, July 10. Robinson later stated the move was due to sponsorship circumstances.

Timmy Hill, part-time driver of Premium's Truck Series entry, drove the No. 98 at New Hampshire and Indianapolis. Hill switched to the No. 62 at Pocono, with Sorenson switching over to the No. 98, which ran as a Chevy at this race. Hill returned to the No. 98 at Watkins Glen, with the car once again running as a Chevy. Hill also ran Michigan and Bristol in the No. 98, before returning to the No. 62 at Darlington, with T. J. Bell running the No. 98. Sorenson returned to the No. 98 at Richmond and ran it again at Chicagoland. Tommy Baldwin Racing leased the No. 98 at New Hampshire in the fall, fielding Ryan Preece. After Sorenson ran the No. 98 for the next several weeks, Premium again leased the owner points, this time to Michael Waltrip Racing at Talladega in the fall, where Waltrip himself drove. Preece then returned to the No. 98, with Premium itself this time, for Martinsville, Texas and Phoenix. TBR again fielded the car for Preece at Homestead-Miami.

In 2016, after the merger with the former No. 40 team, Cole Whitt was announced as the new driver of the No. 98, running the full season. The team inherited a charter from the No. 62 (formerly Baldwin's 36) but leased it to HScott Motorsports for 2016, leaving them without a guaranteed starting spot in races under NASCAR's new qualifying system. Whitt missed the Daytona 500 after spinning and breaking his transmission in his Can-Am Duel race. However, due to a shortage of entries for the next 3 races with only 39 cars at Las Vegas, Phoenix, and Fontana, Whitt and the 98 team made all of the races. The team would later miss the race at Richmond due to the field having 41 cars, a qualifying rainout and Whitt's practice speed being the slowest of the Open teams. Whitt bounced back at Talladega, posting an 18th-place finish despite being involved in a last-lap crash. Later, starting at Pocono, Whitt was moved to the No. 55, with Sorenson coming over from that team to field the No. 98 there and at Michigan. Whitt returned to the No. 98 at Sonoma, with Sorenson sitting out the weekend due to Cody Ware running the 55. The next week at Daytona, Whitt posted Premium's best ever finish after coming home 11th. After finishing 21st at Kentucky, Whitt sat out New Hampshire due to sponsorship issues, with Ryan Ellis running the No. 98. Whitt returned at Indianapolis. Timmy Hill drove the car at Dover. Whitt returned at Charlotte, however Whitt was released by the team after Kansas for a lack of sponsorship. Sorenson drove the car at Kansas (Whitt was in No. 55) after that the team skipped some races. Sorenson returned at Phoenix.

In 2017 the No. 98 was renumbered to No. 15.

==== Car No. 98 results ====
NASCAR Sprint Cup Series results
Year	Driver	No.	Make	1	2	3	4	5	6	7	8	9	10	11	12	13	14	15	16	17	18	19	20	21	22	23	24	25	26	27	28	29	30	31	32	33	34	35	36	Owners	Pts
2015	Josh Wise	98	Ford	DAY	ATL	LVS	PHO	CAL	MAR	TEX	BRI	RCH	TAL	KAN	CLT; 35	DOV; 40	POC; 29	MCH; 34		DAY; 31	KEN; 43																			39th	309
2015	Josh Wise	98	Chevy																SON; 28																					39th	309
2015	Timmy Hill	98	Ford																			NHA; 38	IND; 41				BRI; 39													39th	309
2015	Timmy Hill	98	Chevy																						GLN; 38	MCH; 43														39th	309
2015	Reed Sorenson	98	Chevy																					POC; 34																39th	309
2015	Reed Sorenson	98	Ford																										RCH; 41	CHI; 40		DOV; 33	CLT; 35	KAN; 38						39th	309
2015	T. J. Bell	98	Ford																									DAR; 37												39th	309
2015	Ryan Preece	98	Chevy																												NHA; 32						TEX; 36		HOM; 38	39th	309
2015	Ryan Preece	98	Ford																																	MAR; 42		PHO; 37		39th	309
2015	Michael Waltrip	98	Toyota																																TAL; 13					39th	309
2016	Cole Whitt	98	Toyota	DAY; DNQ									TAL; 18						SON; 34	DAY; 11					GLN; 28															37th	289
2016	Cole Whitt	98	Chevy		ATL; 37	LVS; 39	PHO; 36	CAL; 26	MAR; 30	TEX; 30	BRI; 28	RCH; DNQ		KAN; 39	DOV; 27	CLT; 35					KEN; 21		IND; 29	POC; 31		BRI; 34	MCH; 34	DAR; 37	RCH; DNQ	CHI; 36	NHA; 35		CLT; 27		TAL; Wth	MAR; Wth	TEX; Wth			37th	289
2016	Reed Sorenson	98	Chevy														POC; 28	MCH; 31																				PHO; 36	HOM	37th	289
2016	Reed Sorenson	98	Toyota																															KAN; 34						37th	289
2016	Ryan Ellis	98	Chevy																			NHA; 37																		37th	289
2016	Timmy Hill	98	Chevy																													DOV; 34								37th	289

== Xfinity Series ==
=== Car No. 28 history ===
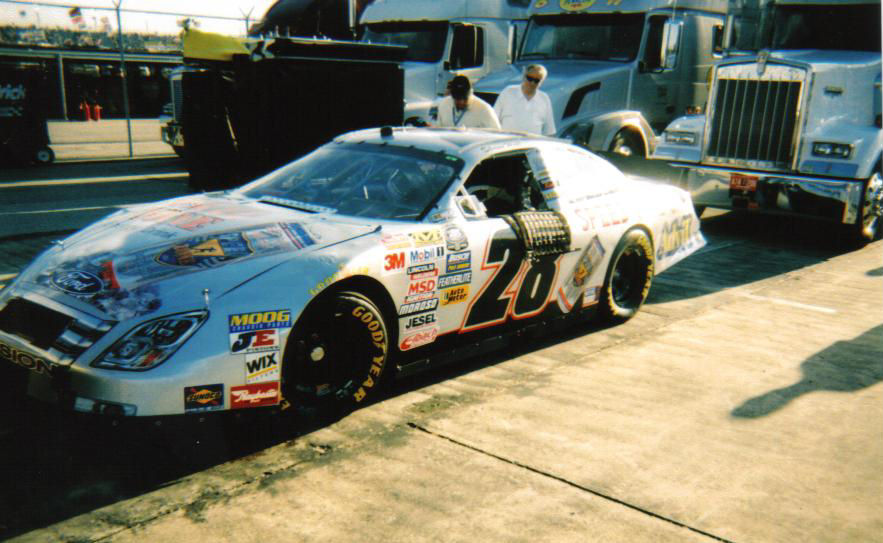
Shane Hall in the 28 at Darlington in 2006.

The No. 28 car made its debut at the 2004 Charter 250. It was sponsored by Yahoo! and driven by Mark Green, who finished 35th in the car. Green piloted the car in six more races that season, before departing for Keith Coleman Racing. Shane Hall drove the car on a limited basis for the rest of the year. Derrike Cope was named the driver for 2005, with sponsorship from Radioshack and Motorola. Cope struggled and was replaced by Shane Hall. Hall only ran on a part-time basis, and did not finish a race. The No. 28 was driven part-time by Hall in 2006. He ran six races and had a best finish of 36th.

For 2007, the team acquired the assets of the former Haas CNC Racing Busch team and ran the No. 28 Chevy full-time with Robert Richardson and Blake Bjorklund. Jeff Green and Johnny Sauter originally drove as well, before leaving to concentrate on their Cup rides. Sponsorship came from Checkers/Rally's Drive-In, U.S. Border Patrol, and Affordable Band Instruments during the 2007 racing season. Their best finish came at Montreal where Swedish road ringer Niclas Jonsson started 8th, led 5 laps and finished 12th after briefly contending to win the race.

In 2008, Kirk Shelmerdine drove the No. 28 at Daytona with sponsorship from Lilly Trucking of Virginia in a one race deal for Daytona. Brian Keselowski was named the driver of the No. 28 after Daytona, however he was released after Bristol. Kenny Wallace was named the driver of the No. 28 for the rest of the year starting at Nashville with the United States Border Patrol providing sponsorship. He provided the team with its career-best third-place finish at Memphis Motorsports Park and finished sixteenth in points. In 2009, he had two top ten finishes and placed eleventh in points, the team's highest finish. The Border Patrol left at the end of the season, and the team was forced to rotate sponsors for 2010. Wallace left the team for RAB Racing, and Robinson hired Derrike Cope to drive full-time in 2011 with sponsorship from Maxelence. Cope ran all the races except for Iowa, in which Dennis Setzer drove. Cope would finish 20th in points with a best finish of 17th at Road America. J. J. Yeley drove the No. 28 in the 2012 season opener at Daytona. David Green and Cope ran one race each with sponsorship from JPO Absorbents. Kevin Lepage took over the No. 28 car with manufacturer support from Chevrolet. However, the team began to focus on its Cup program with Yeley, and returned at Charlotte with Tony Raines.

==== Car No. 28 results ====
NASCAR Nationwide Series results
Year	Driver	No.	Make	1	2	3	4	5	6	7	8	9	10	11	12	13	14	15	16	17	18	19	20	21	22	23	24	25	26	27	28	29	30	31	32	33	34	35	NWSC	Pts
2004	Mark Green	28	Ford	DAY	CAR	LVS	DAR	BRI	TEX	NSH	TAL	CAL	GTY; 35	RCH; 43			DOV; 39	NSH	KEN				NHA; 35	PPR; 41			BRI; 42	CAL	RCH; 41										57th	503
2004	Jimmy Kitchens	28	Ford												NZH; 43	CLT																							57th	503
2004	Josh Richeson	28	Ford																	MLW; 40	DAY	CHI																	57th	503
2004	Shane Hall	28	Ford																						IRP; 41	MCH				DOV; 38	KAN; DNQ	CLT	MEM; DNQ	ATL	PHO				57th	503
2004	Blake Mallory	28	Ford																																	DAR; DNQ	HOM; DNQ		57th	503
2005	Derrike Cope	28	Ford	DAY; 16	CAL; 34	MXC	LVS; 34	ATL; 29	NSH; 29	BRI; 43	TEX; 21	PHO; 29		DAR; 37	RCH; 29	CLT; 42		NSH; 35		MLW; 33	DAY; DNQ	CHI	NHA; DNQ						BRI; 39	CAL; DNQ									41st	1677
2005	Jimmy Kitchens	28	Ford									PHO; QL	TAL; 15																										41st	1677
2005	Tyler Walker	28	Ford														DOV; 43																						41st	1677
2005	Jamie Mosley	28	Ford																KEN; 37									MCH; DNQ					KAN; DNQ	CLT					41st	1677
2005	Shane Hall	28	Ford																					PPR; 43	GTY; 42	IRP; 43	GLN				RCH; 41	DOV; 33			MEM; 43	TEX	PHO; 41	HOM	41st	1677
2006	Shane Hall	28	Ford	DAY	CAL	MXC	LVS	ATL	BRI; DNQ	TEX	NSH; 41	PHO			DAR; DNQ	CLT	DOV	NSH	KEN; 38																				54th	437
2006	Shane Hall	28	Chevy																				NHA; 40	MAR					BRI; 36	CAL									54th	437
2006	Randy MacDonald	28	Chevy										TAL; 43																										54th	437
2006	Jorge Goeters	28	Ford											RCH; DNQ																									54th	437
2006	James Hylton	28	Chevy																	MLW; 41	DAY	CHI																	54th	437
2006	Josh Richeson	28	Chevy																						GTY; 43														54th	437
2006	Todd Shafer	28	Ford																							IRP; DNQ	GLN	MCH											54th	437
2006	Hermie Sadler	28	Chevy																												RCH; DNQ								54th	437
2006	Derrike Cope	28	Chevy																													DOV; 33	KAN	CLT	MEM	TEX	PHO	HOM	54th	437
2007	Robert Richardson Jr.	28	Chevy	DAY; 28						NSH; 31			TAL; 19				DOV; 36	NSH; 30	KEN; 34	MLW; 33	NHA; 39	DAY; 26		GTY; 22	IRP; 27				BRI; 38			DOV; 27			MEM; 31	TEX; 32		HOM; 36	34th	2259
2007	Jeff Green	28	Chevy		CAL; 19		LVS; 23																					MCH; 36											34th	2259
2007	Germán Quiroga	28	Chevy			MXC; 28																																	34th	2259
2007	Johnny Sauter	28	Chevy					ATL; 30	BRI; 23		TEX; 23	PHO; 38				CLT; 36																	KAN; 32						34th	2259
2007	Derrike Cope	28	Chevy											RCH; 29	DAR; 25								CHI; 36				GLN; 35				RCH; 37								34th	2259
2007	Niclas Jönsson	28	Chevy																							CGV; 12													34th	2259
2007	Blake Bjorklund	28	Chevy																											CAL; 30				CLT; 35			PHO; 33		34th	2259
2008	Kirk Shelmerdine	28	Chevy	DAY; 30																																			25th	3143
2008	Brian Keselowski	28	Chevy		CAL; 33	LVS; 42	ATL; 31	BRI; 31																															25th	3143
2008	Kenny Wallace	28	Chevy						NSH; 32	TEX; 26	PHO; 20	MXC; 19	TAL; 30	RCH; 37	DAR; 17	CLT; 23	DOV; 20	NSH; 16	KEN; 29	MLW; 28	NHA; 23	DAY; 25	CHI; 28	GTY; 18	IRP; 22	CGV; 31	GLN; 21	MCH; 30	BRI; 26	CAL; 28	RCH; 18	DOV; 29	KAN; 28	CLT; 16	MEM; 3	TEX; 26	PHO; 15	HOM; 33	25th	3143
2009	Kenny Wallace	28	Chevy	DAY; 16	CAL; 31	LVS; 14	BRI; 14	TEX; 21	NSH; 24	PHO; 29	TAL; 17	RCH; 23	DAR; 18	CLT; 18	DOV; 33	NSH; 16	KEN; 37	MLW; 33	NHA; 20	DAY; 16	CHI; 27	GTY; 29	IRP; 10	IOW; 7	GLN; 19	MCH; 22	BRI; 14	CGV; 17	ATL; 27	RCH; 26	DOV; 20	KAN; 20	CAL; 24	CLT; 21	MEM; 13	TEX; 17	PHO; 17	HOM; 17	19th	3569
2010	Kenny Wallace	28	Chevy	DAY; 16	CAL; 29	LVS; 34	BRI; 19	NSH; 25	PHO; 21	TEX; 27	TAL; 11	RCH; 22	DAR; 20	DOV; 21	CLT; 28	NSH; 25	KEN; 22	ROA; 21	NHA; 32	DAY; 31	CHI; 28	GTY; 20	IRP; 35	IOW; 21	GLN; 21	MCH; 29	BRI; 29	CGV; 13	ATL; 25	RCH; 31	DOV; 22	KAN; 26	CAL; 23	CLT; 27		TEX; 24	PHO; 20	HOM; 28	26th	3198
2010	Kenny Wallace	28	Toyota																																GTY; 13				26th	3198
2011	Derrike Cope	28	Chevy	DAY; 25	PHO; 23	LVS; 25	BRI; 23	CAL; 31	TEX; 32	TAL; 27			DAR; 24	DOV; 27		CLT; 30	CHI; 23	MCH; 28	ROA; 17	DAY; 29	KEN; 25	NHA; 31	NSH; 25	IRP; 22	IOW; 30	GLN; 30		BRI; 25	ATL; 24	RCH; 21	CHI; 32			CLT; 24	TEX; 30	PHO; 32			28th	578
2011	Derrike Cope	28	Dodge								NSH; 30	RCH; 29															CGV; 35					DOV; 26	KAN; 30				HOM; 30		28th	578
2011	Dennis Setzer	28	Chevy												IOW; 25																								28th	578

=== Car No. 49 history ===
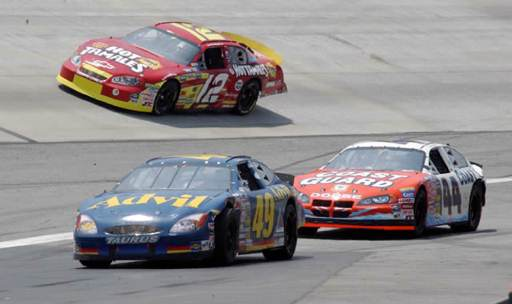
Derrike Cope racing the No. 49.

JRR made its debut in 2000 at Myrtle Beach Speedway. Rodney Childers was the driver of the No. 49 Southern Marine Chevy, but wrecked after 69 laps. JRR returned to the Busch Series at the 2001 NAPA Auto Parts 300. Fielding a Chevrolet, driver Andy Kirby failed to make the field. Their first start came at the Suncom 200, with A.J. Frank driving. He finished 39th after suffering equipment failure. The team made the next race at Atlanta Motor Speedway, with Carl Long finishing 42nd, followed by Bristol Motor Speedway, where they finished 43rd with Jerry McCart driving, as well finishing 42nd at Texas with Robbie Faggart. Frank returned at Nashville, where he finished 38th after wrecking during the race. At the next race at the NASCAR Subway 300, Kirby finished in 16th, the best finish for the team that year. Other drivers who raced for JRR that year were Joe Bush, Dick Trickle, Phil Bonifield, Brian Tyler, Philip Morris, Brian Weber, and Ken Alexander. The team finished 33rd in owner's points that year. Josh’s Eggs would be an associate sponsor for several races throughout the year, beginning with the Joe Bush entry at Richmond.

JRR started 2002 by switching to Ford and Kirk Shelmerdine finishing 31st at Daytona. Faggart returned the next week with sponsorship from Rent-A-Wreck, where he finished 35th, and Craig Raudman at Las Vegas, who finished 32nd. Joe Buford took over the next two races, before David Starr took over at Texas. After that, Kirby returned to the team, finished 6th at Talladega, and ran until the Kroger 300, when he was killed in a motorcycle accident two days after. They made one race with Nick Woodward, then with Dan Pardus. Buford, Troy Cline, and Derrike Cope finished out the year for the team. In 2003, the team hired Bingham and Cope to share the driving duties of the 49. Bingham struggled finishing races and soon moved over to the No. 39 team, while Cope would eventually be released. Shane Hall took over for two races, along with Carlos Contreras. At New Hampshire, Tammy Jo Kirk and sponsor Advil signed on. She ran 15 races that season with a best finish of 21st at Pikes Peak. Cope returned to the 49 in 2004, running 30 out of 34 races, and finishing 27th in points. Vahsholtz made one start at Kentucky, where he finished 36th.

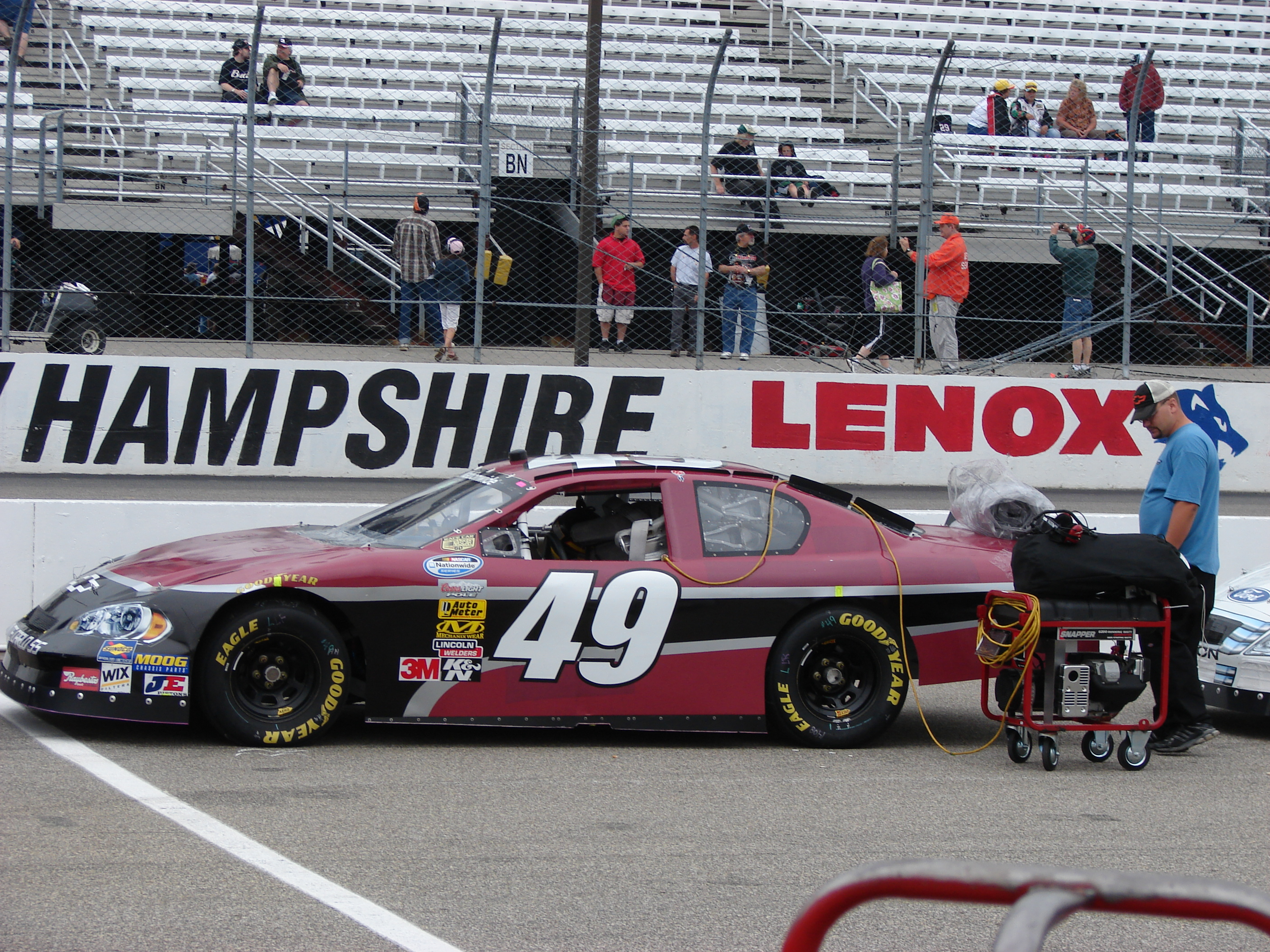
Kertus Davis in the No. 49 at New Hampshire in 2008.

In 2005, JRR hired Steve Grissom to pilot the No. 49 full-time. His best finish was 16th at Talladega. Mara Reyes filled in for him at Autódromo Hermanos Rodríguez, Mexico City. Steve Grissom ran the season-opening race at Daytona in 2006. Then Jorge Goeters (competing for NASCAR Busch Series Rookie of the Year) drove for a few races. Derrike Cope then took over driving duties, sharing the ride with Shane Hall, Steve Grissom, and Jennifer Jo Cobb. Derrike Cope ran three 3 races in the No. 49 in 2007. The No. 49 switched to No. 4 in 2008, after purchasing owners points from Phoenix Racing. Robert Richardson ran eleven races with funding from JVC and Phantom EFX, before Cope took his place for most of the season. In the final races, Patrick Sheltra leased the number and owner's points for his own entry. At the road course events, Phoenix fielded the No. 4 for Landon Cassill, while Cope drove the 49.

For the 2009 season, Kertus Davis began the season as the driver of the No. 49 again in 2009 with GetMoreVacations.com as sponsor. After several races, Mark Green returned to the team as driver. During the season, this team ran as a start and park team.

In 2010, Green ran both the No. 49 and No. 70 cars for JRR under an agreement with ML Motorsports. This same deal was formed for 2010. Brad Teague ran the No. 49 at Bristol in March.

In 2011, this team was entered on occasion, and mostly used to Start and Park which helps fund the primary No. 28 car, with Derrike Cope.

==== Car No. 49 results ====
NASCAR Nationwide Series results
Year	Driver	No.	Make	1	2	3	4	5	6	7	8	9	10	11	12	13	14	15	16	17	18	19	20	21	22	23	24	25	26	27	28	29	30	31	32	33	34	35	NWSC	Pts
2000	Brad Teague	49	Chevy	DAY	CAR	LVS	ATL	DAR	BRI; DNQ	TEX	NSV	TAL	CAL	RCH	NHA	CLT	DOV	SBO																					77th	53
2000	Rodney Childers	49	Chevy																MYB; 43	GLN	MLW	NZH	PPR	GTY															77th	53
2000	Brian Tyler	49	Chevy																						IRP; DNQ	MCH	BRI	DAR	RCH	DOV	CLT	CAR	MEM	PHO	HOM				77th	53
2001	Andy Kirby	49	Chevy	DAY; DNQ								TAL; 16																											33rd	1920
2001	Andy Kirby	49	Ford																									DAR; 33											33rd	1920
2001	Robbie Faggart	49	Chevy		CAR; 35										NHA; 34	NZH; 31																							33rd	1920
2001	Robbie Faggart	49	Ford							TEX; 42			CAL; 35				CLT; 38					CHI; 33	GTY; 36	PPR; 37															33rd	1920
2001	Robbie Faggart	49	Pontiac																	MLW; 28																			33rd	1920
2001	Brian Tyler	49	Chevy			LVS; 33																																	33rd	1920
2001	Brian Tyler	49	Pontiac																						IRP; 26														33rd	1920
2001	Brian Tyler	49	Ford																							MCH; 39													33rd	1920
2001	Carl Long	49	Chevy				ATL; 42																																33rd	1920
2001	A. J. Frank	49	Chevy					DAR; 39			NSH; 38																												33rd	1920
2001	Jerry McCart	49	Chevy						BRI; 43																														33rd	1920
2001	Joe Bush	49	Chevy											RCH; 33																									33rd	1920
2001	Phil Bonifield	49	Pontiac															DOV; 36																					33rd	1920
2001	Dick Trickle	49	Ford																KEN; 38																				33rd	1920
2001	Brian Weber	49	Pontiac																		GLN; 39																		33rd	1920
2001	Ken Alexander	49	Pontiac																								BRI; 43												33rd	1920
2001	Ken Alexander	49	Ford																										RCH; 30		KAN; 37								33rd	1920
2001	Ken Alexander	49	Chevy																											DOV; 32			MEM; 30	PHO; 32	CAR; 36				33rd	1920
2001	Philip Morris	49	Ford																													CLT; 30							33rd	1920
2001	Philip Morris	49	Chevy																																	HOM; 34			33rd	1920
2002	Kirk Shelmerdine	49	Ford	DAY; 31																																			32nd	2221
2002	Robbie Faggart	49	Ford		CAR; 35											CLT; 34																							32nd	2221
2002	Craig Raudman	49	Ford			LVS; 32																																	32nd	2221
2002	Joe Buford	49	Ford				DAR; 43	BRI; 37										NSH; 29												DOV; 31	KAN; 35	CLT; 36	MEM; 35	ATL; 30	CAR; 41	PHO; 26	HOM; 40		32nd	2221
2002	David Starr	49	Ford						TEX; 33																														32nd	2221
2002	Andy Kirby	49	Ford							NSH; 29	TAL; 6	CAL; 32							KEN; 23																				32nd	2221
2002	Troy Cline	49	Ford										RCH; 24	NHA; 23	NZH; 21																								32nd	2221
2002	Nick Woodward	49	Ford														DOV; 30			MLW; 31																			32nd	2221
2002	Dan Pardus	49	Ford																		DAY; 41																		32nd	2221
2002	Dan Shaver	49	Chevy																			CHI; 35				MCH; 43													32nd	2221
2002	Sammy Potashnick	49	Ford																				GTY; 30																32nd	2221
2002	Rick Markle	49	Chevy																					PPR; 39	IRP														32nd	2221
2002	Derrike Cope	49	Ford																								BRI; 36												32nd	2221
2002	Derrike Cope	49	Chevy																									DAR; 27	RCH; 38										32nd	2221
2003	Derrike Cope	49	Pontiac	DAY; 13																																			26th	2491
2003	Derrike Cope	49	Ford							TAL; 14							DOV; 20			MLW; 30	DAY; 35	CHI; 33																	26th	2491
2003	Chris Bingham	49	Ford		CAR; 34	LVS; 37	DAR; 26	BRI; 37	TEX; 26		NSH; 42		RCH; 34			CLT; 33																							26th	2491
2003	Carlos Contreras	49	Ford									CAL; 26																											26th	2491
2003	Jason White	49	Ford											GTY; 23	NZH; 26																								26th	2491
2003	Shane Hall	49	Ford															NSH; 39	KEN; 28																				26th	2491
2003	Tammy Jo Kirk	49	Ford																				NHA; 34	PPR; 21	IRP; 29	MCH; 39	BRI; 37	DAR; 25	RCH; 22	DOV; 24	KAN; 33	CLT; 27	MEM; 28	ATL; 35	PHO; 33	CAR; 32	HOM; 32		26th	2491
2004	Derrike Cope	49	Ford	DAY; 20	CAR; 37	LVS; 27	DAR; 35	BRI; 30	TEX; 31	NSH; 35	TAL; 41	CAL; 33	GTY; INQ	RCH; 27		CLT; 27	DOV; 27	NSH; 24		MLW; 22	DAY; 35	CHI; 38	NHA; 37	PPR; 43		MCH; 34	BRI; 24	CAL; 32	RCH; 28	DOV; 32	KAN; 31	CLT; 38	MEM; 32	ATL; 30	PHO; 30	DAR; 30	HOM; 40		27th	2354
2004	Josh Richeson	49	Ford										GTY; 27																										27th	2354
2004	Mark Green	49	Ford												NZH; 21										IRP; 32														27th	2354
2004	Clint Vahsholtz	49	Ford																KEN; 36																				27th	2354
2005	Steve Grissom	49	Ford	DAY; 28	CAL; 37		LVS; 41	ATL; 40	NSH; 24	BRI; 24	TEX; 29	PHO; 27	TAL; 16	DAR; 36	RCH; 32	CLT; 40	DOV; 30	NSH; 39	KEN; 27	MLW; 38	DAY; 23	CHI; 43	NHA; 30	PPR; 33	GTY; 34	IRP; 27	GLN; 30	MCH; 35	BRI; 36	CAL; 40	RCH; 25	DOV; 28	KAN; 32	CLT; DNQ	MEM; 37	TEX; DNQ	PHO; 38	HOM; DNQ	34th	2168
2005	Mara Reyes	49	Ford			MXC; 35																																	34th	2168
2006	Steve Grissom	49	Ford	DAY; 21																									BRI; 40										41st	1383
2006	Derrike Cope	49	Ford		CAL; DNQ								TAL; 40		DAR; DNQ		DOV; 33			MLW; 34		CHI; DNQ	NHA; 36							CAL; DNQ				CLT; DNQ		TEX; DNQ			41st	1383
2006	Eduardo Goeters	49	Ford			MXC; DNQ																																	41st	1383
2006	Jorge Goeters	49	Ford				LVS; DNQ	ATL; DNQ	BRI; 41	TEX; DNQ	NSH; 24	PHO; DNQ																											41st	1383
2006	Shane Hall	49	Ford											RCH; DNQ				NSH; 37			DAY; 43			MAR; 43	GTY; DNQ	IRP; 37					RCH; DNQ	DOV; 35			MEM; DNQ		PHO; DNQ		41st	1383
2006	Randy LaJoie	49	Ford													CLT; 35																							41st	1383
2006	Jamie Mosley	49	Chevy																KEN; 35																				41st	1383
2006	John Finger	49	Ford																								GLN; DNQ												41st	1383
2006	Dexter Bean	49	Ford																									MCH; DNQ											41st	1383
2006	Jennifer Jo Cobb	49	Ford																														KAN; 43						41st	1383
2006	Morgan Shepherd	49	Ford																																			HOM; DNQ	41st	1383
2007	Derrike Cope	49	Chevy	DAY	CAL	MXC	LVS	ATL	BRI	NSH	TEX	PHO	TAL	RCH	DAR	CLT	DOV	NSH	KEN	MLW; 43	NHA	DAY	CHI	GTY; 42	IRP; 41	CGV	GLN	MCH	BRI; DNQ	CAL	RCH	DOV	KAN	CLT	MEM	TEX	PHO	HOM	70th	139
2008	Robert Richardson Jr.	4	Chevy	DAY; 31	CAL; 25	LVS; 19	ATL; 32	BRI; 32	NSH; 35	TEX; 29	PHO; 30	MXC	TAL; 19	RCH; 34																									30th	2528
2008	Derrike Cope	4	Chevy												DAR; 32	CLT; 34	DOV; 24	NSH; 36	KEN; 31		NHA; 30	DAY; 28	CHI; 38	GTY; 34	IRP; 38	CGV	GLN	MCH; 25	BRI; 39	CAL; 30	RCH; 31	DOV; 32	KAN; 37	CLT; 43	MEM; 26	TEX; 34	PHO	HOM	30th	2528
2008	Jerick Johnson	4	Chevy																	MLW; 35																			30th	2528
2009	Kertus Davis	49	Chevy	DAY; 38	CAL; 25	LVS; DNQ	BRI; DNQ	TEX; DNQ	NSH; 40	PHO; 39	TAL; 22	RCH; 42	DAR; 40	CLT; DNQ	DOV; 36	NSH; 35																							39th	1683
2009	Kevin Hamlin	49	Chevy														KEN; 36																						39th	1683
2009	Mark Green	49	Chevy															MLW; 35	NHA; 36	DAY; 39	CHI; 43	GTY; 35	IRP; 43	IOW; 38	GLN; 38	MCH; 36	BRI; 38	CGV; 33	ATL; 40	RCH; 38	DOV; 42	KAN; 38	CAL; 35	CLT; 38	MEM; DNQ	TEX; 43	PHO; 34	HOM; 26	39th	1683
2010	Mark Green	49	Chevy	DAY; Wth	CAL	LVS; 41	BRI; DNQ	NSH; 41	PHO	TEX; 42	TAL; 28	RCH; 41	DAR	DOV	CLT	NSH; 36	KEN; 40	ROA	NHA	DAY; 41	CHI; 38	GTY; 43	IRP; 39	IOW; 34	GLN	MCH; 26	BRI; 36	CGV	ATL	RCH; 35	DOV	KAN; DNQ	CAL	CLT; 40	GTY; DNQ	TEX; DNQ		HOM; 25	43rd	1036
2010	David Green	49	Chevy																																		PHO; 36		43rd	1036
2011	Brad Teague	49	Chevy	DAY	PHO	LVS	BRI; 42	CAL							IOW; 38																								46th	102
2011	Dennis Setzer	49	Chevy						TEX; 38	TAL	NSH; 37	RCH; 38					CHI; 35	MCH; 43	ROA	DAY	KEN; 43	NHA																	46th	102
2011	David Green	49	Chevy										DAR; 42	DOV		CLT; 41																							46th	102
2011	Mark Green	49	Chevy																				NSH; 40	IRP; 35	IOW; 37	GLN; 40	CGV	BRI; 38	ATL; 42	RCH; 40	CHI; 35	DOV; 36	KAN; DNQ	CLT; DNQ	TEX; DNQ	PHO; 36	HOM; DNQ		46th	102

=== Other teams ===
The 39 cars were purchased from Robert Yates Racing in 2003, who had repossessed the equipment from Angela's Motorsports. The team's first race was at the Koolerz 300, with Mike McLaughlin driving a fan-supported ride. He qualified fourth, but was involved in a crash late in the race, and finished 29th. Joe Buford and Clint Vahsholtz ran the next two races. Jason White began running the 39 with Three Stooges Beer as the sponsor. Eventually, road racer Chris Bingham was moved to the 39 car after struggling in the 49 car. Following his release, Jamie Mosley and Dana White finished out the year. For the 2004 season Andy Ponstein began the year in the 39 with sponsorship from Yahoo!, but wrecked several times during his tenure and was released. Tina Gordon came on after that, and had a best finish of 26th at Pikes Peak, before she was released. The 39 has not run since.

JRR revived its third team in 2008 as the No. 49. Derrike Cope first attempted a race with the car at Mexico City, but failed to qualify. The car next ran at Nashville Superspeedway, when Shane Hall finished last after an early vibration problem. Kertus Davis joined the team at Kentucky and ran the rest of season in No. 49 after leaving his family owned JD Motorsports team, his best finish being 35th. JRR has not run a third car since then.

==== Car No. 48 results ====
NASCAR Nationwide Series results
Year	Driver	No.	Make	1	2	3	4	5	6	7	8	9	10	11	12	13	14	15	16	17	18	19	20	21	22	23	24	25	26	27	28	29	30	31	32	33	34	35	NWSC	Pts
2001	Nate Monteith	94	Pontiac	DAY	CAR	LVS	ATL	DAR	BRI	TEX	NSH	TAL	CAL	RCH	NHA	NZH; 36	CLT	DOV	KEN	MLW	GLN	CHI	GTY	PPR	IRP	MCH	BRI	DAR	RCH	DOV	KAN	CLT	MEM	PHO	CAR	HOM			100th	31
2003	Mike McLaughlin	39	Ford	DAY; 29																																			35th	1660
2003	Joe Buford	39	Ford		CAR; 41																																		35th	1660
2003	Clint Vahsholtz	39	Ford			LVS; 40																															HOM; DNQ		35th	1660
2003	Jason White	39	Ford				DAR; 40	BRI	TEX	TAL; 31			RCH; 42				DOV; 34																						35th	1660
2003	Shane Hall	39	Ford								NSH; 38																												35th	1660
2003	Chris Bingham	39	Ford									CAL; 38		GTY; 34	NZH; 30																								35th	1660
2003	Brad Baker	39	Dodge													CLT; DNQ																							35th	1660
2003	Jamie Mosley	39	Ford															NSH; 21	KEN; DNQ			CHI; 26		PPR; 26		MCH; 40	BRI; 36	DAR; 33	RCH; 39	DOV; 26	KAN; DNQ	CLT; DNQ							35th	1660
2003	Blake Mallory	39	Ford																	MLW; 32														ATL; 40	PHO; DNQ				35th	1660
2003	Dan Pardus	39	Ford																		DAY; DNQ																		35th	1660
2003	Derrike Cope	39	Ford																				NHA; 35																35th	1660
2003	Jerry Reary	39	Ford																						IRP; 31														35th	1660
2003	Dana White	39	Ford																														MEM; DNQ						35th	1660
2003	Mark Green	39	Ford																																	CAR; 27			35th	1660
2003	Shane Hall	89	Ford	DAY	CAR	LVS	DAR	BRI	TEX	TAL	NSH	CAL	RCH	GTY	NZH; 43	CLT	DOV	NSH	KEN	MLW	DAY	CHI	NHA	PPR	IRP	MCH	BRI	DAR	RCH	DOV	KAN	CLT	MEM	ATL	PHO	CAR	HOM		122nd	0
2004	Robby Benton	39	Ford	DAY; DNQ																																			36th	1696
2004	Andy Ponstein	39	Ford		CAR; 25	LVS; DNQ	DAR; 34	BRI; 29		NSH; 34			GTY; 34	RCH; 30	NZH; 27	CLT; 33	DOV; 37																						36th	1696
2004	Brad Teague	39	Ford						TEX; DNQ																														36th	1696
2004	Jimmy Kitchens	39	Ford								TAL; 32																												36th	1696
2004	Mark Green	39	Ford									CAL; 42						NSH; 28	KEN; 23	MLW; 23																			36th	1696
2004	Tina Gordon	39	Ford																		DAY; 32	CHI; 30	NHA; 36	PPR; 26	IRP; 40	MCH; 39	BRI; 38	CAL; 41	RCH; DNQ	DOV; 39	KAN; 40	CLT; DNQ	MEM; DNQ	ATL; DNQ	PHO; DNQ	DAR; 41	HOM; DNQ		36th	1696
2005	Derrike Cope	94	Ford	DAY	CAL	MXC	LVS	ATL	NSH	BRI	TEX	PHO; DNQ	TAL	DAR	RCH	CLT	DOV	NSH	KEN	MLW	DAY	CHI	NHA	PPR	GTY	IRP	GLN	MCH	BRI	CAL	RCH	DOV; DNQ	KAN	CLT	MEM	TEX	PHO	HOM	97th	28
2008	Derrike Cope	49	Chevy	DAY	CAL	LVS	ATL	BRI	NSH	TEX	PHO	MXC; DNQ	TAL	RCH	DAR	CLT	DOV	NSH; QL		MLW; 38						CGV; 43	GLN; DNQ												46th	841
2008	Shane Hall	49	Chevy															NSH; 43																					46th	841
2008	Kertus Davis	49	Chevy																KEN; 37		NHA; 35	DAY; 42	CHI; 42	GTY; 43	IRP; 39			MCH; DNQ	BRI; DNQ	CAL; 43	RCH; 42	DOV; 37	KAN; 40	CLT; DNQ	MEM; 39	TEX; 43	PHO; 42	HOM; 41	46th	841
2011	Dennis Setzer	48	Chevy	DAY	PHO	LVS	BRI	CAL	TEX	TAL	NSH	RCH	DAR	DOV	IOW	CLT	CHI	MCH	ROA	DAY	KEN	NHA	NSH	IRP	IOW	GLN	CGV	BRI	ATL	RCH; 39	CHI; 41	DOV	KAN; DNQ	CLT; DNQ	TEX; DNQ	PHO	HOM		76th	0

== Camping World Truck Series ==
=== Truck No. 15 history ===
In 2017, the team fielded another Truck Series entry, using the No. 15. Gray Gaulding was signed to drive part-time and began racing at Chicagoland finishing 25th. In 2018, the team expanded to full-time with driver Robby Lyons, who previously drove in a couple races for the team in 2017. Lyons would be replaced by Cup driver Reed Sorenson in a few races midseason, and by JR Heffner for the race at Eldora Speedway. Phil Parsons son Stefan will make his truck series debut at Bristol Motor Speedway.

==== Truck No. 15 results ====
NASCAR Camping World Truck Series results
Year	Driver	No.	Make	1	2	3	4	5	6	7	8	9	10	11	12	13	14	15	16	17	18	19	20	21	22	23	NCWTC	Pts
2017	Gray Gaulding	15	Chevy	DAY	ATL	MAR	KAN	CLT	DOV	TEX	GTW	IOW	KEN	ELD	POC	MCH	BRI	MSP	CHI; 25	NHA; 25	LVS		MAR; 31	TEX; 27			37th	102
2017	D. J. Kennington	15	Chevy																			TAL; 15					37th	102
2017	Jason Hathaway	15	Chevy																						PHO; 11		37th	102
2017	Wendell Chavous	15	Chevy																							HOM; 23	37th	102
2018	Robby Lyons	15	Chevy	DAY; 13	ATL; 25	LVS; 18	MAR; 24		KAN; 26	CLT; 23					KEN; 22												22nd	295
2018	Reed Sorenson	15	Chevy					DOV; 30			TEX; 27						POC; 30										22nd	295
2018	Bobby Reuse	15	Chevy									IOW; 25															22nd	295
2018	Bryant Barnhill	15	Chevy										GTW; 31														22nd	295
2018	Ross Chastain	15	Chevy											CHI; 26							LVS; 7						22nd	295
2018	J. R. Heffner	15	Chevy													ELD; 24											22nd	295
2018	Todd Peck	15	Chevy															MCH; 26									22nd	295
2018	Stefan Parsons	15	Chevy																BRI; 17						PHO; 20		22nd	295
2018	Wendell Chavous	15	Chevy																	MSP; 24							22nd	295
2018	Jamie Mosley	15	Chevy																			TAL; DNQ					22nd	295
2018	Brad Foy	15	Chevy																				MAR; 28				22nd	295
2018	Mike Harmon	15	Chevy																					TEX; 22			22nd	295
2018	Reid Wilson	15	Chevy																							HOM; 30	22nd	295

=== Truck No. 49 history ===
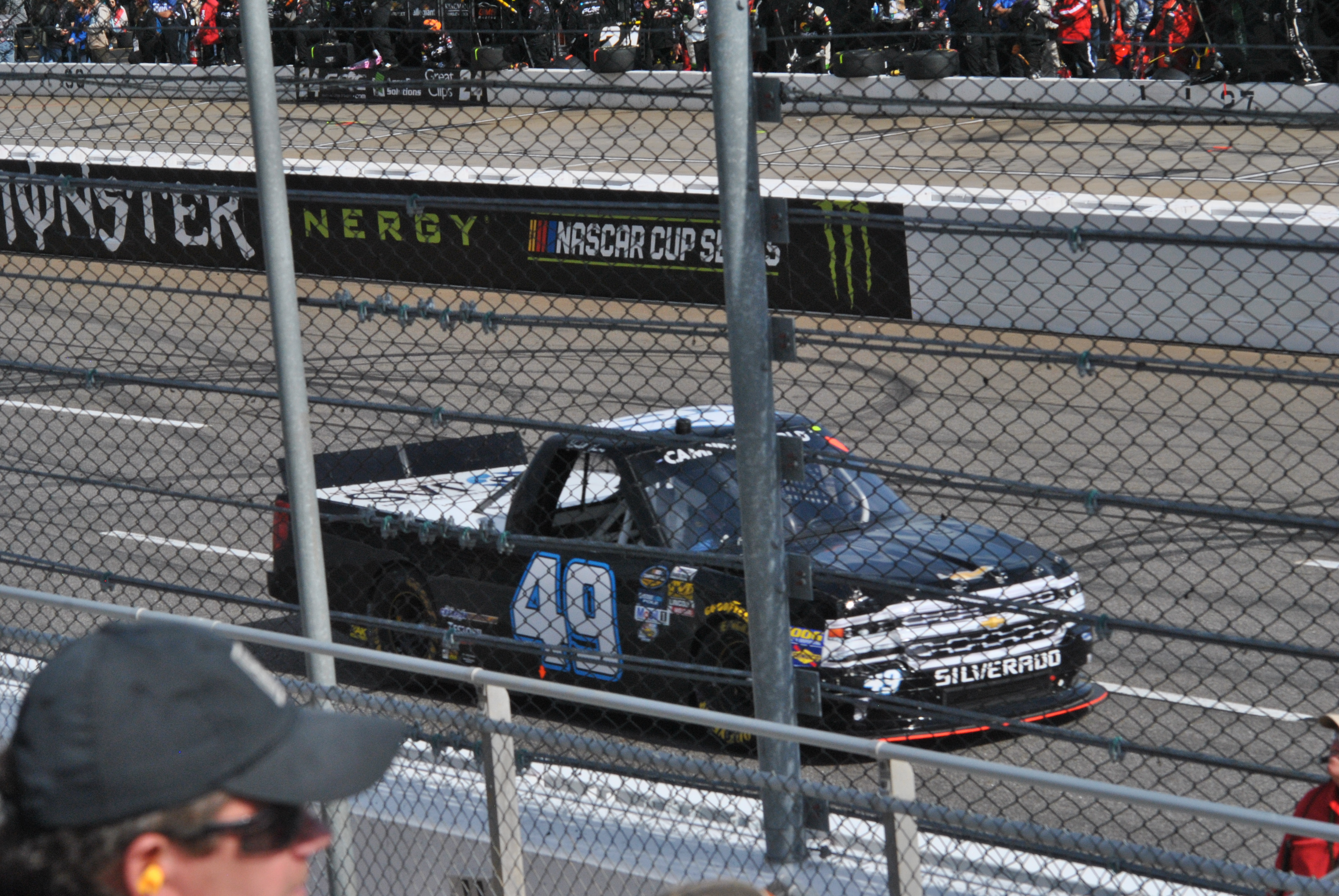
Wendell Chavous in the No. 49 at Martinsville Speedway in 2017

In 2015, the team fielded a full-time Truck Series entry, using the No. 94 (inverse of the 49). Wendell Chavous was signed to drive the full season, except the season opener at Daytona where he was not approved to run. Former Truck Series champion Travis Kvapil was hired to drive at Daytona. Kvapil started on the outside pole, but finished 15th after sustaining damage in a wreck. Chavous made his Truck Series debut at Atlanta. The team suffered their first DNQ at Martinsville. Chavous was replaced by Timmy Hill beginning at Dover, though he returned to the team to drive at Eldora, and drove the next three races before being released again. T. J. Bell drove at Mosport, then Hill returned once again, although Wayne Edwards drove a single race at Las Vegas (due to Hill's Cup Series commitments to the team).

In 2016, Hill was announced as the full-time driver of the Truck, which switched numbers to Robinson's traditional No. 49. The team later struck a deal with JR Motorsports to loan them the Truck for use with Nick Drake. Edwards also drove in Hill's place at Texas. Spencer Boyd drove at Gateway. Hill returned at Kentucky, but has not run the Truck since and later moved to MBM Motorsports in the Xfinity Series. Drivers of the No. 49 since then have included Edwards, Sorenson, D. J. Kennington and Bryce Napier.

In 2017, Wendell Chavous competed full-time in this truck and for NASCAR Rookie of the Year honors.

In 2018, Premium Motorsports announced that their Truck Series team would shut down, focusing exclusively on the Cup Series.

==== Truck No. 49 results ====
NASCAR Camping World Truck Series results
Year	Driver	No.	Make	1	2	3	4	5	6	7	8	9	10	11	12	13	14	15	16	17	18	19	20	21	22	23	NCWTC	Pts
2015	Travis Kvapil	94	Chevy	DAY; 15																							19th	521
2015	Wendell Chavous	94	Chevy		ATL; 24	MAR; DNQ	KAN; 16	CLT; 25						ELD; 26	POC; 25	MCH; 23	BRI; 26										19th	521
2015	Timmy Hill	94	Chevy						DOV; 15	TEX; 23	GTW; 18	IOW; 18	KEN; 15						CHI; 18	NHA; 20		TAL; 20	MAR; 26	TEX; 20	PHO; 18	HOM; 21	19th	521
2015	T. J. Bell	94	Chevy															MSP; 13									19th	521
2015	Wayne Edwards	94	Chevy																		LVS; 24						19th	521
2016	Timmy Hill	49	Chevy	DAY; 14	ATL; 21	MAR; 23	KAN; 21		CLT; 31				KEN; 23														23rd	247
2016	Nick Drake	49	Chevy					DOV; 16			IOW; 23																23rd	247
2016	Wayne Edwards	49	Chevy							TEX; 23				ELD; 18							LVS; 28						23rd	247
2016	Spencer Boyd	49	Chevy									GTW; 19															23rd	247
2016	Reed Sorenson	49	Chevy												POC; 18		MCH; 21		CHI; 28			TAL; 18		TEX; 24		HOM; 28	23rd	247
2016	Bryce Napier	49	Chevy													BRI; 28									PHO; 25		23rd	247
2016	D. J. Kennington	49	Chevy															MSP; 14					MAR; 23				23rd	247
2016	Josh Wise	49	Chevy																	NHA; 27							23rd	247
2017	Wendell Chavous	49	Chevy	DAY; 19	ATL; 20	MAR; 23	KAN; 31	CLT; 28	DOV; 19	TEX; 20	GTW; 18	IOW; 17	KEN; 19	ELD; 16	POC; 20	MCH; 17	BRI; 23		CHI; 18	NHA; 18	LVS; 14	TAL; 24	MAR; 21	TEX; 21			19th	385
2017	Gary Klutt	49	Chevy															MSP; 24									19th	385
2017	Robby Lyons	49	Chevy																						PHO; 12	HOM; 24	19th	385
2018	Wendell Chavous	49	Chevy	DAY; 12	ATL; 23	LVS; 14	MAR; 18	DOV; 17	KAN; 27	CLT; 22	TEX; 12	IOW; 21	GTW; 15	CHI; 22	KEN; 24	ELD; 23	POC; 21	MCH; 16	BRI; 23		LVS; 28	TAL; 5					19th	405
2018	D. J. Kennington	49	Chevy																	MSP; 12			MAR; 25		PHO; 21	HOM; 26	19th	405
2018	Reed Sorenson	49	Chevy																					TEX; 20			19th	405

== See also ==
- NEMCO Motorsports
- Identity Ventures Racing
