= Brad Foy =

American racing driver (born 1985)

- Born: September 6, 1985 (age 41); Greenwood Lake, New York, U.S.

NASCAR FedEx Freight Truck Series career
- 1 race run over 1 year
- 2018 position: 85th
- First race: 2018 Texas Roadhouse 200 (Martinsville)
Wins	Top tens	Poles
0	0	0

Brad Foy (born September 6, 1985) is an American professional stock car racing driver. He last competed part-time in the NASCAR Camping World Truck Series, driving the No. 15 Chevrolet Silverado for Premium Motorsports.

== Racing career ==
=== NASCAR Camping World Truck Series ===
Foy intended to attempt the 2015 Kroger 200 in the No. 0 Chevrolet Silverado for Jennifer Jo Cobb Racing, but withdrew from the race.

In 2016, Foy failed to qualify for the Texas Roadhouse 200 in the No. 10 Chevrolet Silverado for Jennifer Jo Cobb Racing. He spun and hit the wall with just under two minutes remaining in the first round of qualifying.

In 2018, Foy participated in his first NASCAR race, driving the No. 15 Chevrolet Silverado for Premium Motorsports at Martinsville.

== Motorsports career results ==
=== NASCAR ===
(key) (Bold – Pole position awarded by qualifying time. Italics – Pole position earned by points standings or practice time. * – Most laps led.)

==== Camping World Truck Series ====
NASCAR Camping World Truck Series results
Year	Team	No.	Make	1	2	3	4	5	6	7	8	9	10	11	12	13	14	15	16	17	18	19	20	21	22	23	NCWTC	Pts	Ref
2015	JJC Racing	0	Chevy	DAY	ATL	MAR	KAN	CLT	DOV	TEX	GTW	IOW	KEN	ELD	POC	MCH	BRI	MSP	CHI	NHA	LVS	TAL	MAR; Wth	TEX	PHO	HOM	117th	-	
2016	JJC Racing	10	Chevy	DAY	ATL	MAR	KAN	DOV	CLT	TEX	IOW	GTW	KEN	ELD	POC	BRI	MCH	MSP	CHI	NHA	LVS	TAL	MAR; DNQ	TEX	PHO	HOM	119th	-	
2018	Premium Motorsports	15	Chevy	DAY	ATL	LVS	MAR	DOV	KAN	CLT	TEX	IOW	GTW	CHI	KEN	ELD	POC	MCH	BRI	MSP	LVS	TAL	MAR; 28	TEX	PHO	HOM	85th	9	
