= NASCAR career of Kyle Busch =

Career of professional NASCAR Cup Series driver Kyle Busch

Kyle Busch was an American professional stock car racing driver and team owner. During his career, which began in 2003, he set numerous NASCAR records, and across its top three Series, won 234 races. He was a two-time NASCAR Cup Series champion, having won in 2015 and 2019, and also was the 2009 NASCAR Nationwide Series champion.

Before his death, he drove full-time in the No. 8 Chevrolet ZL1 for Richard Childress Racing in the NASCAR Cup Series. Busch also competed part-time in the NASCAR Craftsman Truck Series, piloting the No. 7 Chevrolet Silverado for Spire Motorsports. He also had starts planned later in 2026 to drive the No. 8 Chevrolet Camaro for JR Motorsports in the CARS Late Model Stock Car Tour.

During his career, Busch drove for Hendrick Motorsports in the Cup Series from 2003 to 2007, Joe Gibbs Racing from 2008 to 2022, and Richard Childress Racing from 2023 to his death in 2026. In the Xfinity Series, Busch drove for Hendrick Motorsports from 2003 to 2007, Joe Gibbs Racing, Braun Motorsports, and D'Hondt Humphrey Motorsports in 2008, Joe Gibbs Racing from 2009 to 2011, Kyle Busch Motorsports in 2012, and again with Joe Gibbs Racing from 2013 to 2021. In the Truck Series, Busch drove for Roush Racing in 2001, Morgan-Dollar Motorsports in a one-off event at Indianapolis Raceway Park in 2004, Billy Ballew Motorsports from 2005 to 2009, Kyle Busch Motorsports from 2010 to 2023, and Spire Motorsports from 2024 to his death in 2026.

The 2026 Go Bowling at The Glen marked Busch's final Cup race for points, where he finished in eighth, while the 2026 NASCAR All-Star Race was the final Cup race of any sort he would appear in. The 2026 Ecosave 200 in the Craftsman Truck Series was his final NASCAR win overall.

== Hendrick Motorsports (2003–2007) ==
Busch joined the NASCAR Busch Series in 2003 as a development driver for Hendrick Motorsports, after leaving Roush Racing's program. He ran seven ARCA Re/Max Series races for Hendrick, winning at Nashville Superspeedway in April and again at Kentucky Speedway in May.

After turning 18 in May, Busch competed in seven Busch Series races for NEMCO Motorsports, finishing second twice, including in his debut at Lowe's Motor Speedway and at Darlington Raceway. In November, he was set to make his Cup debut at Homestead in Hendrick's No. 60 Chevrolet, but withdrew after failing pre-race tech and not having a backup car.

=== 2004: Busch Series Rookie of the Year ===
Busch started his 2004 season by winning the ARCA Re/MAX Series race at Daytona, beating Frank Kimmel. He then began his first full-time Busch Series season, replacing Brian Vickers in the No. 5 Chevrolet, sponsored by Lowe's. Although initially set to share the No. 8 Chance 2 Motorsports Chevrolet with Martin Truex Jr., Busch took a ride with Hendrick Motorsports instead. He earned his first pole at Darlington Raceway and his first win at Richmond International Raceway in the Funai 250 in May. Busch won four more races, tying Greg Biffle for the most wins by a rookie, and finished 2nd in points behind champion Martin Truex Jr., winning Rookie of the Year honors.

Busch debuted in the Nextel Cup Series in 2004, driving the No. 84 Chevrolet for Hendrick Motorsports. He attempted nine races, qualifying for six, with his first at Las Vegas Motor Speedway. His best finish was 24th at California Speedway. In October 2004, it was announced Busch would race full-time for Hendrick in 2005, replacing Terry Labonte in the No. 5 Chevrolet as Labonte semi-retired.

=== 2005: Cup Series Rookie of the Year ===
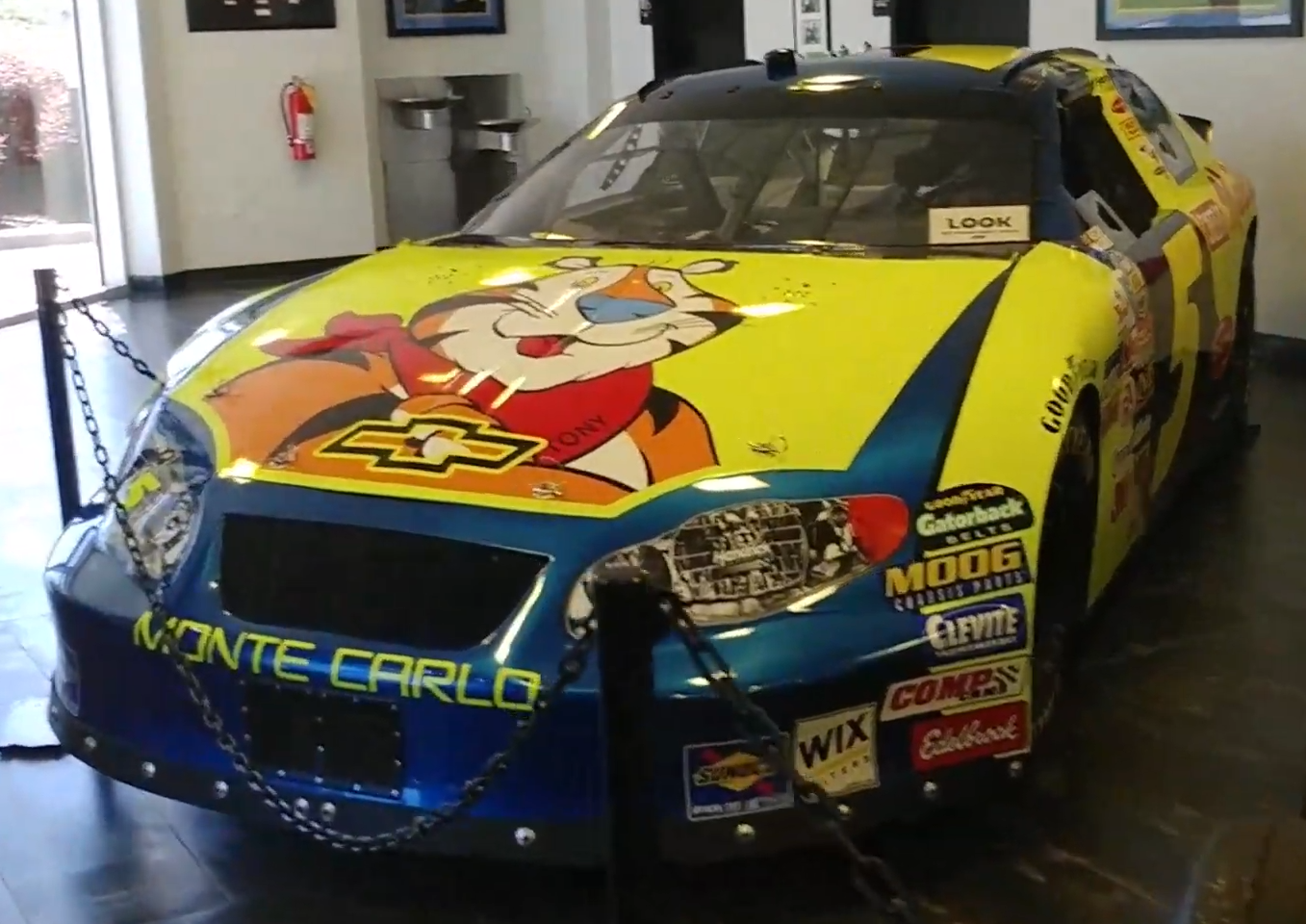
Busch's 2005 Sony HD 500 race-winning car

In 2005, Busch won his first Sprint Cup race at California Speedway in September, claiming the Sony HD 500. At 20 years, 4 months, and 2 days, he became the youngest winner in series history, four days younger than the previous record-holder, Donald Thomas. (Note: The current recordholder is Joey Logano, who won the 2009 Lenox Industrial Tools 301 at New Hampshire Motor Speedway at an age of 19 years, 1 month and 4 days.) Busch won his second race of the season at Phoenix International Raceway, finishing 20th in points and earning the Nextel Cup Series Rookie of the Year title. He also became the youngest pole-sitter in history after qualifying fastest for the Auto Club 500 at California Speedway in February.

Busch competed on a limited basis in both the Busch Series and Craftsman Truck Series in 2005. In the Busch Series, he ran 14 races and claimed a victory at Lowe's Motor Speedway in May. In the Craftsman Truck Series, he participated in 11 races for Billy Ballew Motorsports, winning three of them. His first Truck Series win, achieved at Lowe's Motor Speedway on May 20, 2005, made him the youngest winner in series history at the time. (Note: The current youngest Camping World Truck Series winner is Cole Custer, winning at New Hampshire Motor Speedway in September 2014 at 16 years, 7 months, and 28 days.)

=== 2006: First Chase Appearance ===
Busch began the 2006 season with a 23rd-place finish in the Daytona 500. At the Coca-Cola 600, he was fined US$50,000 and placed on probation after crashing on lap 314 and throwing his HANS device at Casey Mears' car in frustration. Despite the incident, Busch secured his first Nextel Cup Series win at the Lenox Industrial Tools 300 in New Hampshire. He qualified for the Chase for the Nextel Cup for the first time by finishing second at Richmond in September, ultimately ending the season 10th in points, 448 behind champion Jimmie Johnson.

In the NASCAR Busch Series, Busch competed in all but one race during the season, securing a victory in the spring race at Bristol Motor Speedway and finishing seventh in the points standings. In the Craftsman Truck Series, he participated in seven races, including a win at the Quaker Steak and Lube 200 at Lowe's Motor Speedway. Notably, his truck was painted to resemble Rowdy Burns' car from the movie Days of Thunder.

=== 2007: Final Year with Hendrick Motorsports ===
In 2007, Busch became the first Nextel Cup Series driver to win in the Car of Tomorrow, claiming victory at the Food City 500 at Bristol Motor Speedway in March. Despite the win, Busch criticized the car, stating, "I'm still not a very big fan of these things. I can't stand to drive them, they suck." The victory marked Hendrick Motorsports' 200th NASCAR national touring series win, (Note: Including the Cup, Nationwide and Truck Series, the team's 200th Sprint Cup win was scored by Jimmie Johnson in the 2012 Bojangles' Southern 500.) Chevrolet's 600th NASCAR victory, and the first win for a Chevrolet Impala in NASCAR since Wendell Scott's 1963 triumph at Speedway Park in Jacksonville, Florida. (Note: Although the race Scott won was held in December 1963, it was considered part of the 1964 season by NASCAR.) In April at Texas Motor Speedway, Busch left the track without notifying his team after a crash, prompting Dale Earnhardt Jr. to step in as a relief driver. Later that month, in the Busch Series Aaron's 312 at Talladega Superspeedway, Busch endured a violent crash, flipping his car seven times in a wreck involving Tony Stewart and Casey Mears, which cracked his HANS device from the impact.

During the Nextel All-Star Challenge at Lowe's Motor Speedway in May, Busch and his older brother Kurt were involved in a crash while battling for the win, knocking both out of the race. The incident left the brothers upset with each other. Kurt joked, "I won't be eating any Kellogg's soon," referencing Kyle's sponsor, while Kyle declined to be interviewed. Both drivers were warned to avoid further conflicts. Although they claimed to be reconciling, it was later revealed that they didn’t speak to each other until their grandmother intervened at the family Thanksgiving dinner that year.

On June 15, 2007, Busch announced he would leave Hendrick Motorsports at the end of the season. Although a contract extension was offered, Dale Earnhardt Jr. was signed to replace him for 2008. Busch described the decision as mutual but noted it was influenced by a change in his agent. On July 7, 2007, Busch narrowly lost to Jamie McMurray in the Pepsi 400, finishing second by 0.005 seconds. In August, he confirmed he would join Joe Gibbs Racing in 2008, replacing J. J. Yeley in the No. 18 Toyota. His time with Hendrick Motorsports ended with a 20th-place finish at Homestead and a 5th-place finish in the season standings. In a 2021 interview with Graham Bensinger, Busch revealed that incidents such as the 2007 All-Star Race and other outbursts led to a breakdown in his relationship with Rick Hendrick and the team.

Busch competed in nineteen Busch Series races in 2007, securing four wins and finishing sixteenth in the points standings. Additionally, he raced eleven times in the Craftsman Truck Series for Billy Ballew Motorsports, earning two victories.

== Joe Gibbs Racing (2008–2022) ==
=== 2008: Strong Regular Season that Ends with a Chase Collapse ===
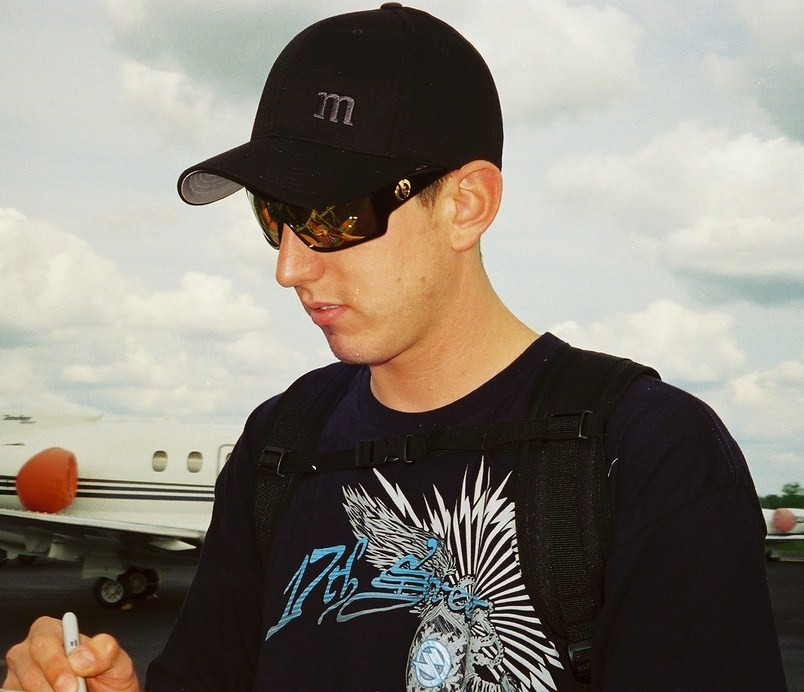
Busch in May 2008

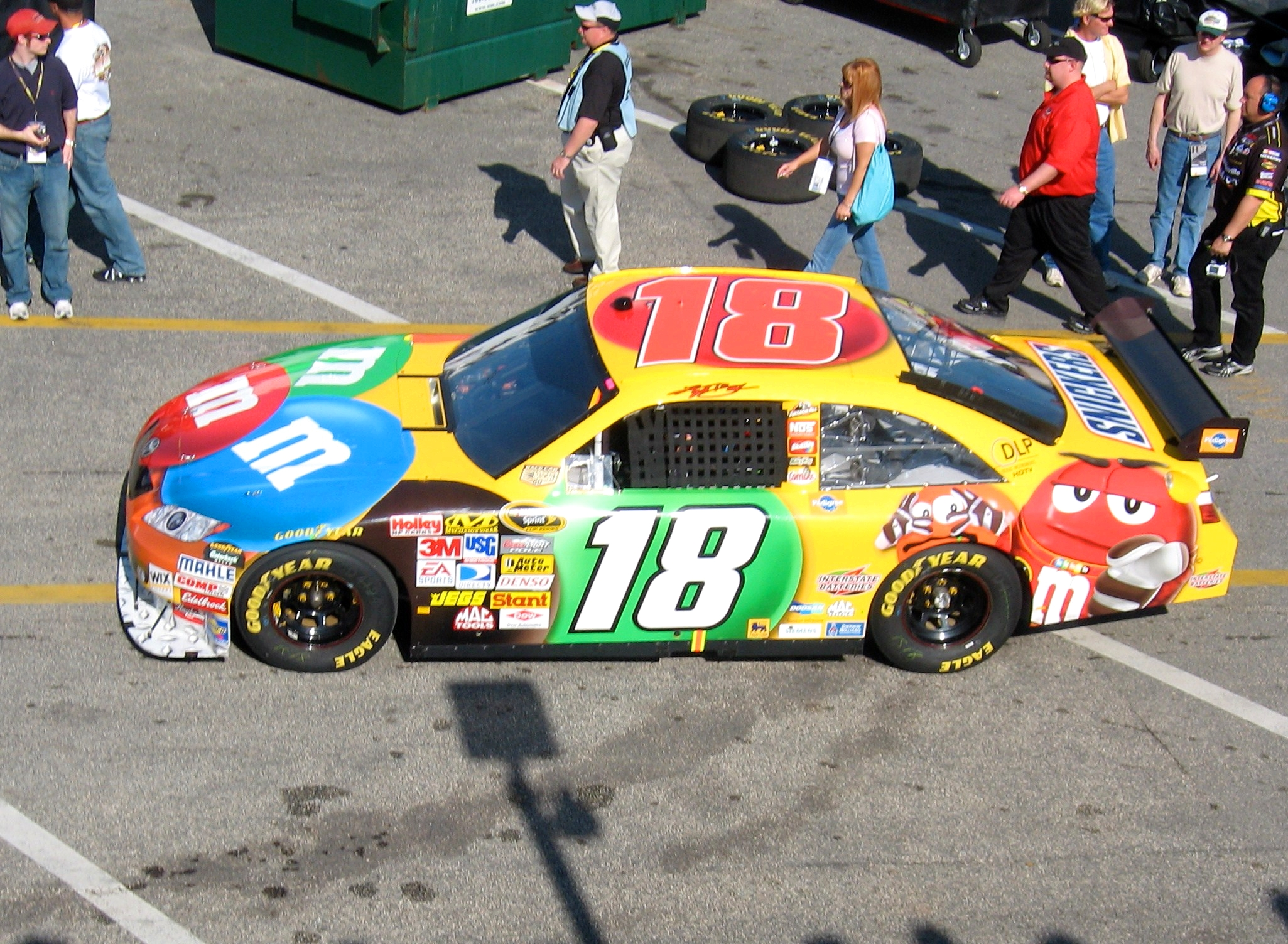
Busch's 2008 NASCAR Sprint Cup Series car

In August 2007, he announced he would join Joe Gibbs Racing in 2008, replacing J. J. Yeley in the No. 18 Toyota. Busch began his tenure with JGR by leading the most laps in the 50th Daytona 500, finishing 4th, and followed it with another 4th-place finish at Auto Club Speedway, becoming the series points leader for the first time in his career. He earned his first win with JGR and Toyota’s first Sprint Cup points-race victory at Atlanta Motor Speedway in the Kobalt Tools 500. Later, at Richmond International Raceway, Busch spun Dale Earnhardt Jr. with three laps to go, allowing Clint Bowyer to win and sparking backlash from Earnhardt’s fans.

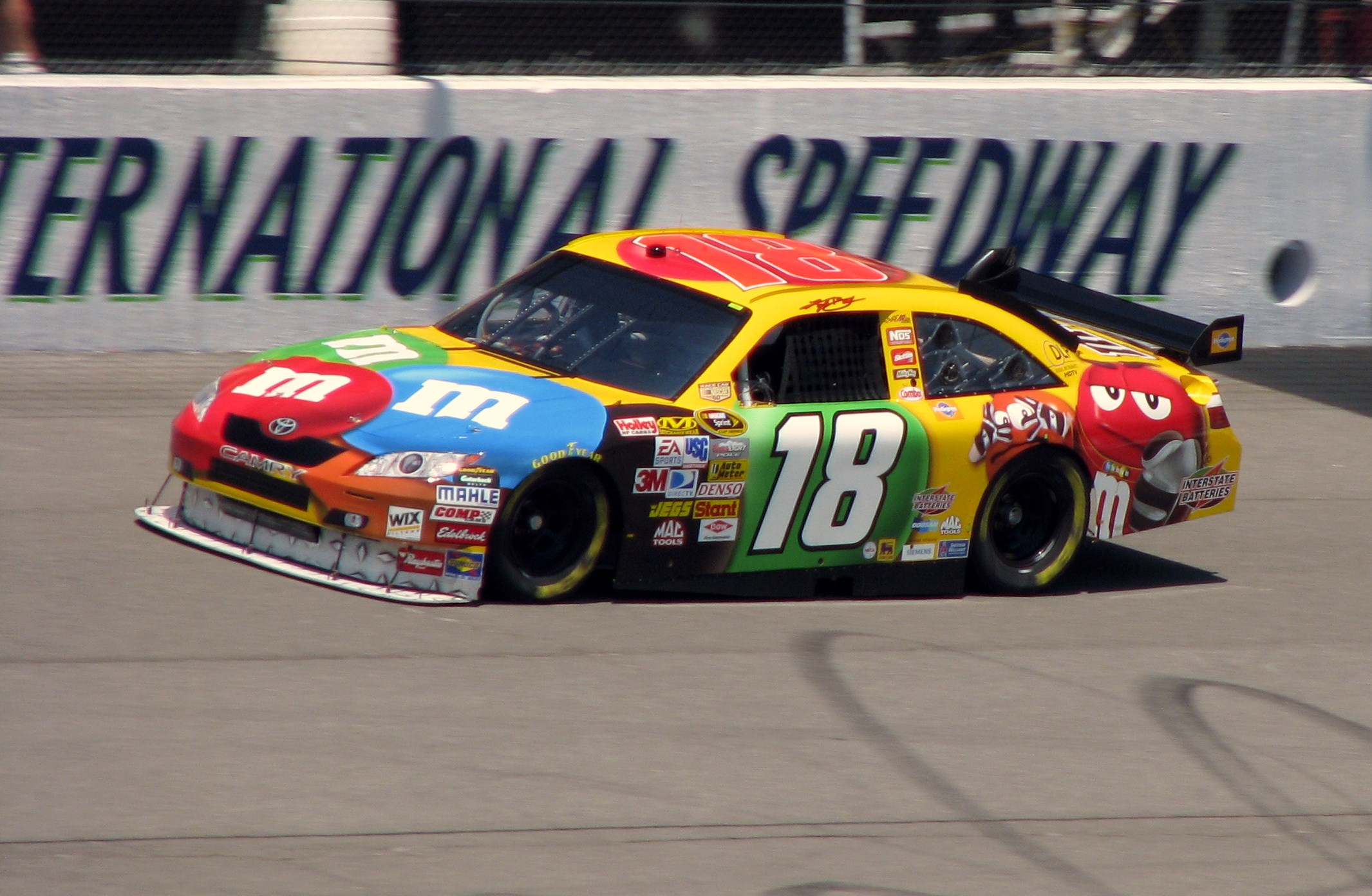
Busch racing at Michigan International Speedway in 2008

Busch won seven more Sprint Cup races during the summer of 2008. However, in August at Bristol Motor Speedway, Busch's dominant run ended when Carl Edwards bumped him out of the way and went on to win the race. Afterward, Busch expressed his frustration by bumping Edwards’ car, prompting Edwards to retaliate by spinning Busch out, which drew cheers from the crowd. Both drivers were subsequently placed on probation for the incident.

Busch entered the Chase as the points leader, but back-to-back poor finishes at New Hampshire Motor Speedway and Dover International Speedway caused him to drop from a 20-point lead to twelfth in the standings. Despite the setback, he rallied to finish the season in tenth place, recording a then career-high eight wins and 21 top-ten finishes.

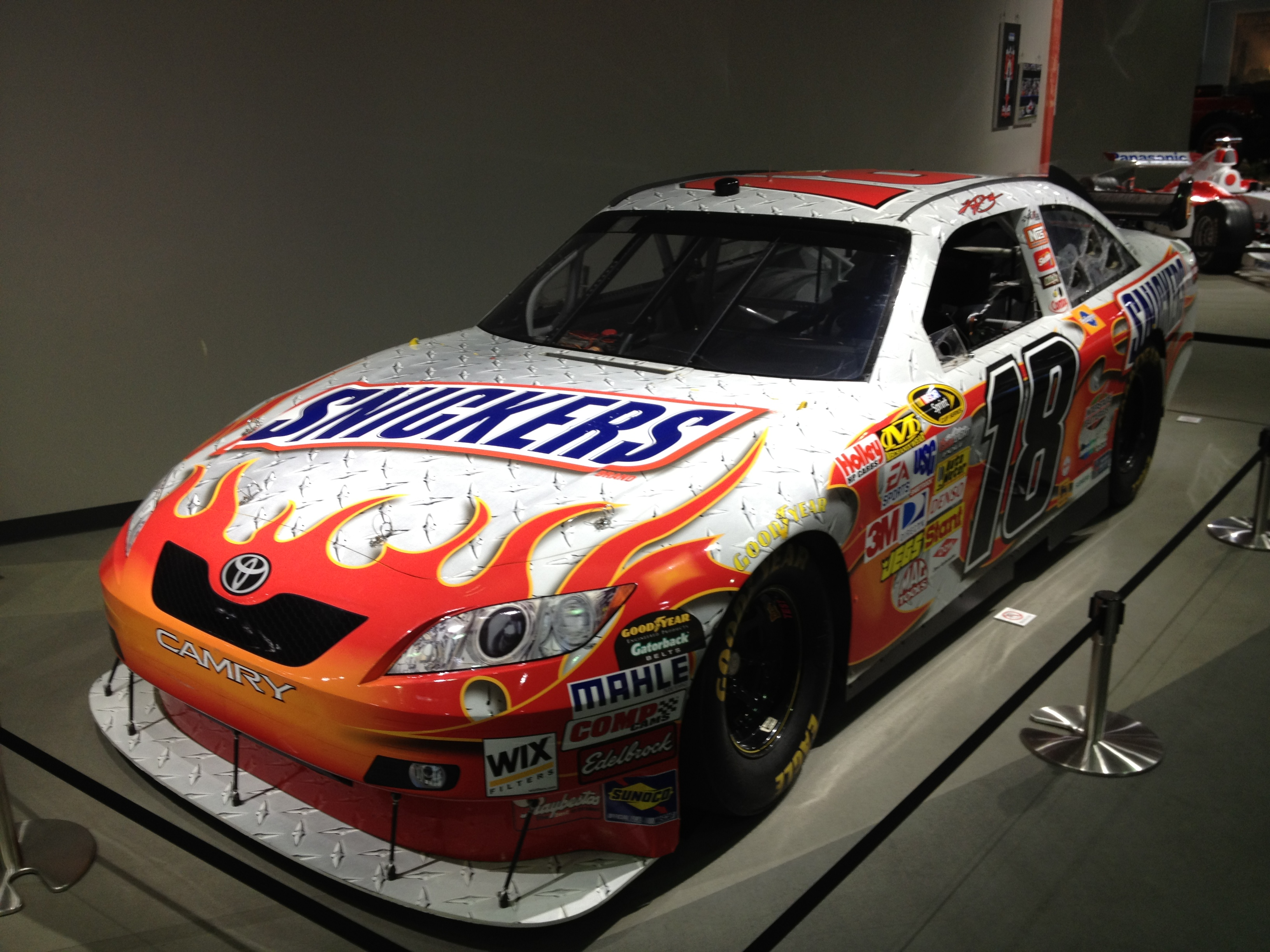
Busch's 2008 Atlanta-winning ride at the museum.

Busch competed in 30 Nationwide Series races during the 2008 season, contributing to Joe Gibbs Racing's No. 20 Toyota team winning the owners' championship alongside teammates Denny Hamlin, Joey Logano, and Tony Stewart. Busch drove for three teams and piloted four different cars, winning races in three of them. He recorded 10 wins, 4 pole positions, 20 top-ten finishes, and 18 top-fives, tying Sam Ard's 24-year-old record for most wins in a single season. His cars included the No. 18 and No. 20 for Joe Gibbs Racing, the No. 32 for Braun Racing (a Toyota-affiliated team), and the No. 92 for D'Hondt Motorsports (a one-off race).

In the Craftsman Truck Series, Busch secured a second-place finish in the Chevy Silverado 250 at Daytona International Speedway. The following week, he claimed victory in the San Bernardino County 200 at Auto Club Speedway in Fontana, California. Two weeks later, he earned another win at Atlanta in the American Commercial Lines 200. His third and final win of the 2008 Truck Series season came on August 20 at Bristol Motor Speedway.

=== 2009: Xfinity Series Championship ===
Busch started the 2009 season with a strong performance, winning his Gatorade Duel qualifying race for the Daytona 500. Although he led the most laps in the Daytona 500, he was involved in "The Big One" and failed to finish the race. The following week at Auto Club Speedway, Busch made history by becoming the first driver in NASCAR to win two national touring series races on the same day, claiming victories in the Truck Series San Bernardino County 200 and the Nationwide Series Stater Brothers 300. He went on to secure Sprint Cup wins at Las Vegas Motor Speedway and Bristol Motor Speedway later in the season.

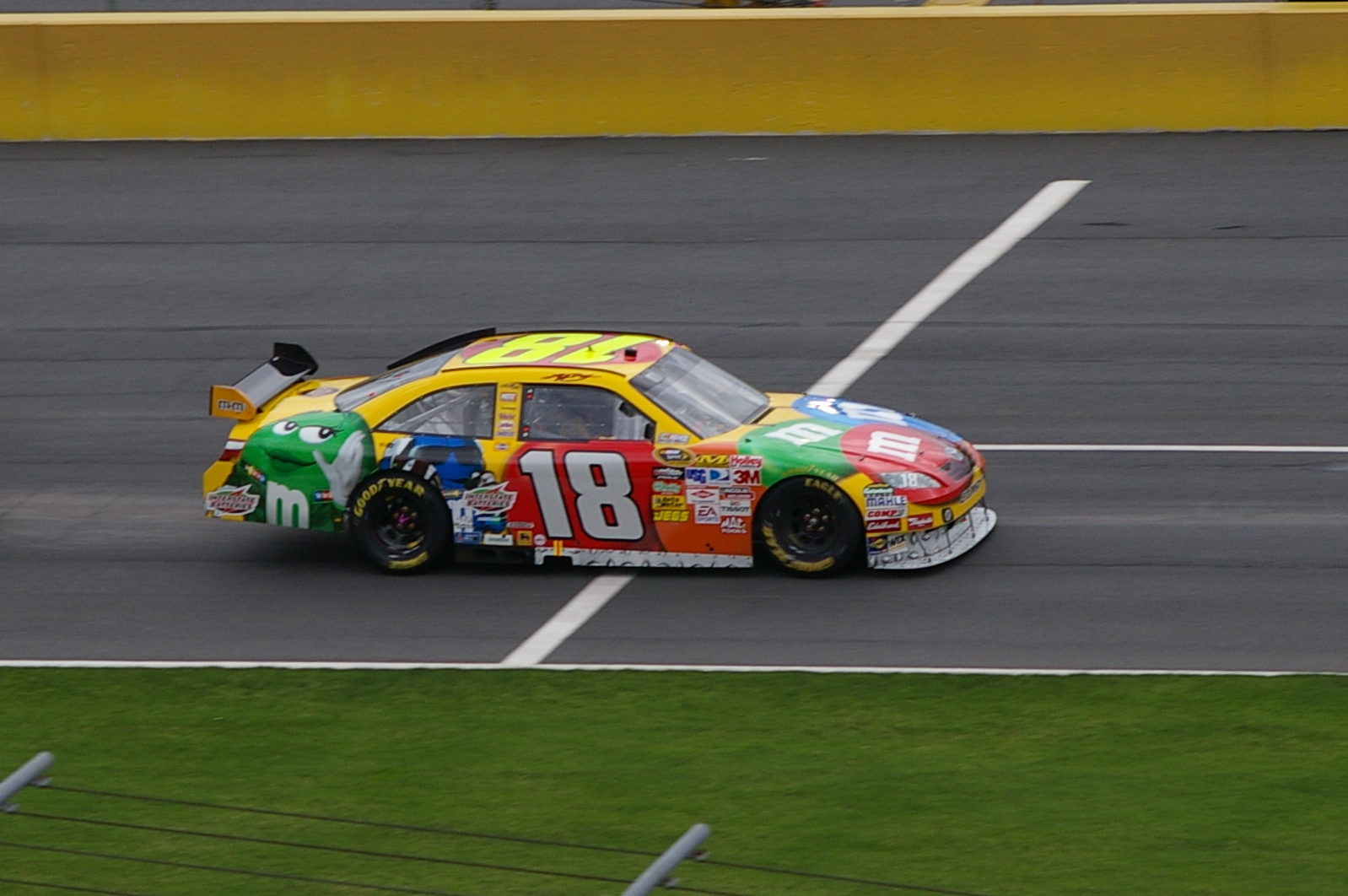
Kyle Busch on pit road at Charlotte Motor Speedway.

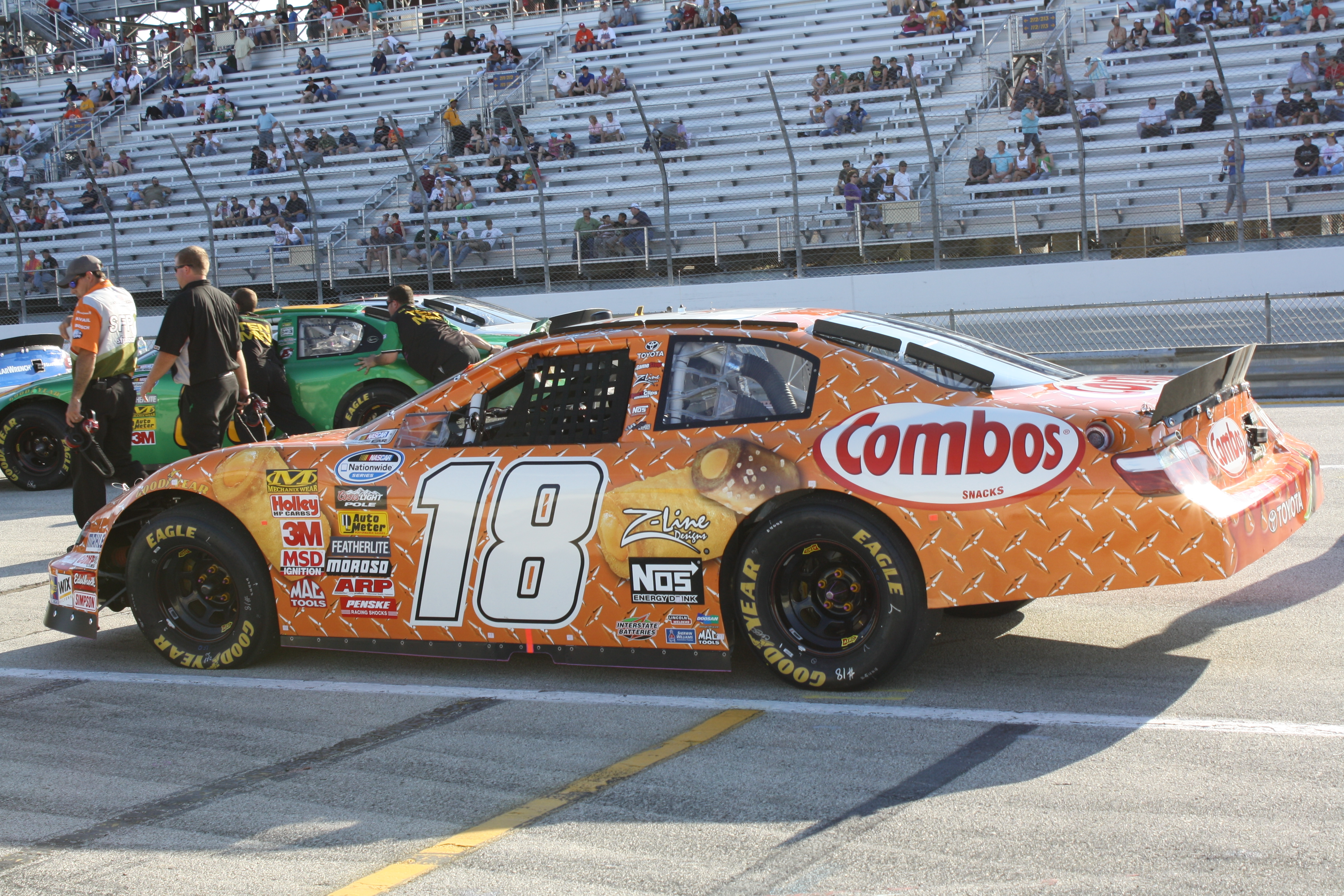
2009 Nationwide championship car at Milwaukee

On May 2, 2009, Busch became the second driver in NASCAR Sprint Cup Series history to win a race on his birthday, following Cale Yarborough. Busch achieved this milestone with a victory in the Crown Royal Presents the Russ Friedman 400 at Richmond International Raceway. (Note: Busch was the second driver to win on his birthday; he later became one of three drivers to do so after Matt Kenseth won on his birthday at Las Vegas Motor Speedway in 2013.) Later that season, during the Coke Zero 400 at Daytona International Speedway, Busch was involved in a dramatic wreck while attempting to block Tony Stewart for the win. Stewart ultimately won the race and apologized for the incident in Victory Lane. Busch claimed his fourth win of the season in August at Bristol Motor Speedway but narrowly missed qualifying for the Chase for the Sprint Cup, finishing eight points behind Brian Vickers. In November, during the Dickies 500 at Texas Motor Speedway, Busch was poised to sweep all three races at the track that weekend. However, with just three laps remaining, he ran out of fuel, allowing his brother, Kurt Busch, to take the victory.

Busch competed in the full 2009 NASCAR Nationwide Series schedule, marking his first full-season effort since his rookie year in 2004. At the season finale at Homestead–Miami Speedway on November 21, Busch clinched his first NASCAR championship with a victory in the race. He became the first driver since Sam Ard in 1983 to win both the season finale and the championship in the same year. Busch's dominant season included nine wins, 25 top-five finishes, and 30 top-ten finishes. In addition to his Nationwide Series success, Busch won seven races in the Camping World Truck Series in 2009. He also made a single appearance in the Camping World East Series, winning from the pole at Iowa Speedway.

=== 2010: 8th Place Cup Series Finish and Nationwide Series Dominance ===
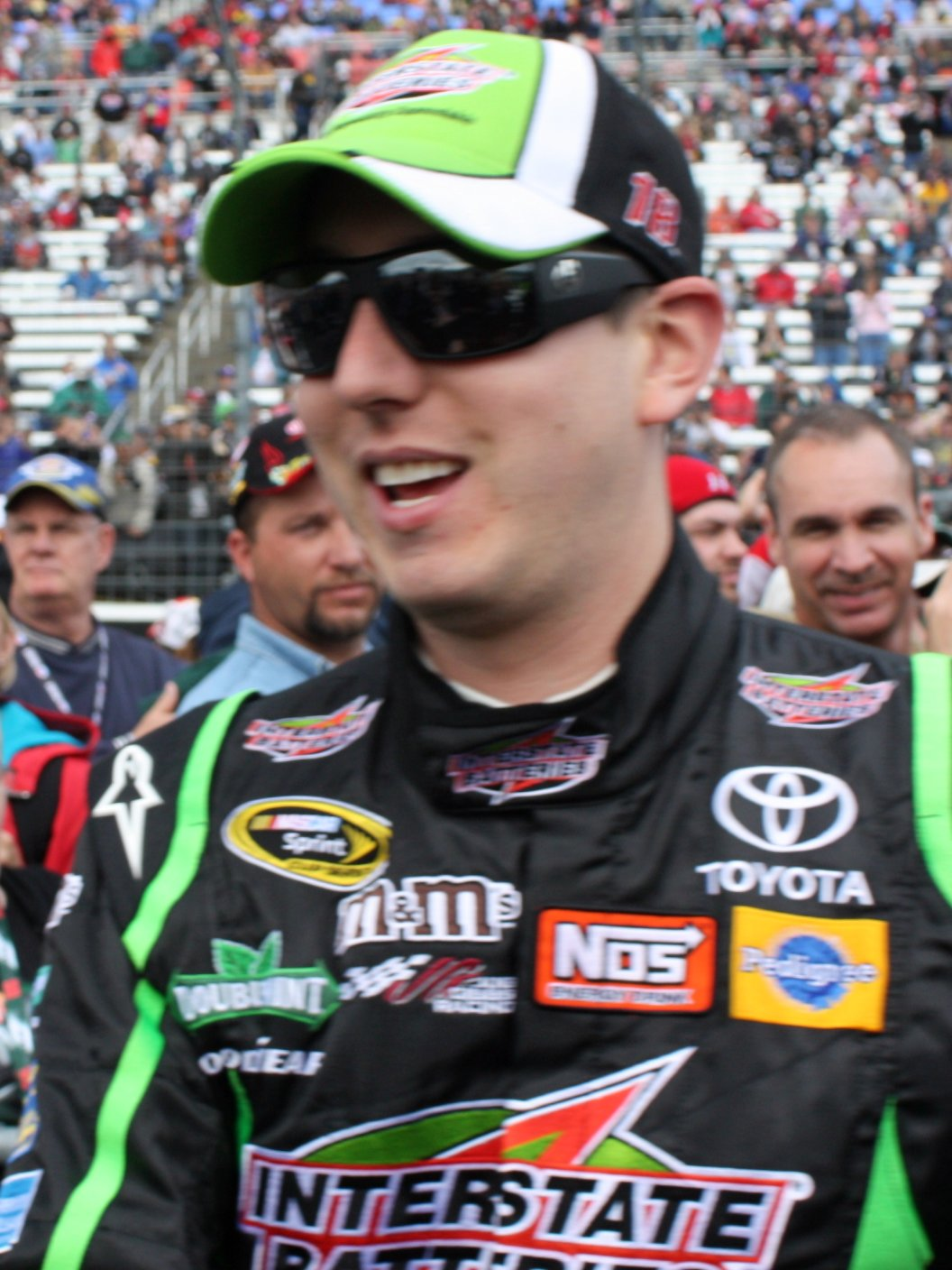
Busch in April 2010

On December 11, 2009, Busch announced the formation of Kyle Busch Motorsports, which planned to field two teams in the NASCAR Camping World Truck Series for the 2010 season. Busch intended to drive the No. 18 Toyota Tundra part-time, with Brian Ickler scheduled to drive the remaining races. The second truck, the No. 56, was initially assigned to Tayler Malsam. However, after both Ickler and Malsam accepted offers to compete in the Nationwide Series, and amid financial challenges due to insufficient sponsorship, Busch decided to withdraw the No. 56 from competition. When Busch wasn’t behind the wheel of the No. 18, it was driven by Johnny Benson Jr. and Kasey Kahne.

On August 21, 2010, Busch made NASCAR history by becoming the first driver to win all three national touring series events in a single weekend. This feat was accomplished at Bristol Motor Speedway, where he secured victories in the Camping World Truck Series, Nationwide Series, and Sprint Cup Series over the course of four days. During driver introductions for the Cup race, fellow NASCAR driver Brad Keselowski referred to Busch as "an ass," a reaction to Busch intentionally wrecking him during the Nationwide Series race the night before.

On November 7, 2010, at Texas Motor Speedway, Busch spun out midway through the race and later sped on pit road while pitting to change tires. While serving a penalty, his in-car camera captured him making an obscene gesture toward officials. As a result, Busch was penalized an additional two laps, fined US$25,000, and placed on probation for the remainder of the year.

In the 2010 Nationwide Series, he won 13 races, breaking the record for most wins in a single season, previously held by Sam Ard with 10. That same year, Busch secured three Cup Series wins and eight Truck Series victories, including a win at Talladega Superspeedway over Aric Almirola by just 0.002 seconds—the closest finish in Camping World Truck Series history since the introduction of electronic scoring. His No. 18 Truck Series team also claimed the 2010 owners' championship.

=== 2011: Second Chase Collapse ===
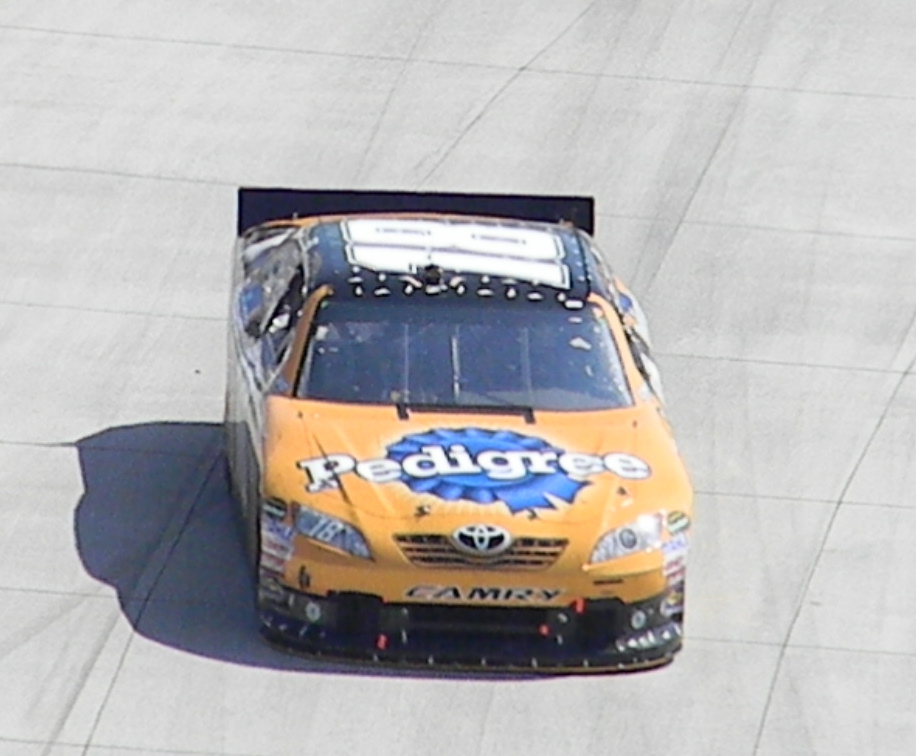
Busch's car during the 2011 Goody's Fast Relief 500

Busch's 2011 Sprint Cup Series season kicked off with a wreck in the Budweiser Shootout at Daytona International Speedway. He competed in all three NASCAR points events at Daytona, achieving his best result with a fifth-place finish in the Truck Series race. The following week at Phoenix, Busch dominated the Truck Series event and led every lap to win the Nationwide Series Bashas' Supermarkets 200. He came close to sweeping all three races at Phoenix but was overtaken by Jeff Gordon with nine laps remaining in the Sprint Cup race. In March, Busch completed his second career sweep of a Bristol weekend, winning all three races. Later, on April 30, 2011, he secured his third consecutive spring victory at Richmond International Raceway, marking his second win of the 2011 season.

During the Southern 500 on May 7, 2011, Busch was involved in an on-track incident with Kevin Harvick. After the race, tensions escalated when Busch used his car to push Harvick’s unoccupied car on pit road. As a result, both Busch and Harvick were fined US$25,000 and placed on probation for four races, including the Sprint All-Star Race. Later that season, after the Truck Series O'Reilly Auto Parts 250 at Kansas Speedway, Busch became involved in an altercation with team owner Richard Childress. During the race’s cooldown lap, Busch bumped Childress’ No. 22 truck, driven by Joey Coulter. About 30 minutes after the race, witnesses reported that Childress approached Busch, put him in a headlock, and began punching him. The altercation stemmed from prior tension, as Childress had previously stated, following the Harvick incident at Darlington, that he would take it personally if Busch damaged one of his vehicles again. For his actions, Childress was fined US$150,000 and placed on probation for the remainder of the year. Busch later stated the bump was meant as a congratulatory gesture and added that if he had known it would upset Childress, he would have paid for the repairs.

Busch claimed victory in the inaugural Sprint Cup race at Kentucky Speedway on July 9, 2011, defeating David Reutimann and Jimmie Johnson. In August, he led the most laps at Watkins Glen but lost the lead to Marcos Ambrose during a Green–white–checkered finish. The following week, Busch won the Pure Michigan 400 at Michigan International Speedway, becoming the first driver of the season to secure a spot in the Chase for the Sprint Cup.

On August 24, 2011, during the Truck Series O'Reilly 200 at Bristol Motor Speedway, Busch was involved in a crash with Elliott Sadler's truck from Joe Denette Motorsports, which sent Busch into the wall and caused significant damage to his vehicle. While waiting for the caution flag, Busch drove aggressively around the track and intentionally hit Sadler, spinning him out. Busch later claimed that Sadler, a regular driver for Harvick in the Nationwide Series, had crashed him on purpose due to Harvick’s ongoing feud with Busch in the Sprint Cup Series. Both Sadler and Harvick denied any connection to the incident, and no penalties were imposed.

On August 26, 2011, Busch won the Nationwide Series Food City 250 at Bristol Motor Speedway, surpassing Mark Martin for the most Nationwide Series wins with 50. He also became the first driver to win three consecutive races at Bristol in the series. The race featured the closest finish in Bristol's Nationwide Series history, with Busch edging out teammate Joey Logano by just 0.019 seconds.

==== Hornaday incident ====
On November 4, 2011, during the Camping World Truck Series WinStar World Casino 350K at Texas Motor Speedway, Busch became involved in a controversial incident. While passing lapped driver Johnny Chapman, Busch made contact with championship contender Ron Hornaday Jr., causing a caution flag. Under the yellow flag, Busch then drove to Hornaday's truck and intentionally turned him into the outside wall, severely damaging Hornaday's vehicle and effectively ending his title hopes. NASCAR responded by black-flagging Busch, parking him for the remainder of the race. This marked the first time a driver was parked since Carl Edwards in the 2010 Sprint Cup Series at Atlanta. Busch declined to comment after speaking with NASCAR officials, while Hornaday responded, saying, "I'll be at his house Monday morning" if Busch was not suspended.

The following morning, NASCAR president Mike Helton announced that after discussions with Busch and team owner Joe Gibbs, Busch would remain sidelined for the rest of the weekend. This included both the Nationwide Series' O'Reilly Auto Parts Challenge and the Sprint Cup's AAA Texas 500. Denny Hamlin replaced Busch in the Nationwide Series event, while Michael McDowell drove Busch's No. 18 car in the Sprint Cup race. Helton's decision was made under an "emergency-only" rule, which allows NASCAR to park a driver to maintain the "orderly conduct of the event." As this was not classified as a suspension under NASCAR's rules, Busch could not appeal the decision. It marked the second time since the Truck Series began in 1995 that NASCAR had parked a driver across national series. The first instance occurred in 2002 during a Craftsman Truck Series race at Martinsville when Kevin Harvick was parked after making a threatening radio comment and intentionally spinning out Coy Gibbs. It was only the third cross-series sanction in NASCAR's 64-year history. Busch's parking mathematically eliminated him from Sprint Cup championship contention, though his realistic chances of winning had already been extinguished in previous races. Later that day, Busch apologized for his actions, acknowledging that the Texas incident was "certainly a step backward." Additionally, Busch offered Ron Hornaday, who was leaving Kevin Harvick Incorporated at season's end, the chance to drive his No. 18 truck in 2012. Hornaday declined, citing his long-standing relationship with Chevrolet.

On November 7, 2011, NASCAR fined Busch US$50,000 for "actions detrimental to stock car racing." Additionally, Busch was placed on probation for the remainder of the year and was warned that any further offenses harmful to stock car racing or disruption of NASCAR events could result in an indefinite suspension.

On November 10, 2011, it was reported that M&M's, the primary sponsor of Kyle Busch's Sprint Cup team, refused to sponsor the No. 18 car for the final races of the season due to Busch's behavior at Texas. Joe Gibbs Racing briefly considered Aric Almirola as a replacement for Busch, but ultimately decided to allow Busch to drive in the last two races with Interstate Batteries as the sponsor. However, Busch was replaced in the team's Nationwide Series car for the season finale at Homestead–Miami Speedway at the request of the team's sponsor, Z-Line Designs. Denny Hamlin replaced Busch in the Nationwide car, as he had done previously in Texas.

=== 2012: Missing the chase ===
Busch racing at Las Vegas Motor Speedway in 2012

At the start of the 2012 season, Busch announced he would transition in the Nationwide Series from running full-time for Joe Gibbs Racing to a limited schedule with his own team, Kyle Busch Motorsports. He would drive alongside his brother Kurt and also cut back his Truck Series schedule to just three races.

Busch’s 2012 season started with a victory in the Budweiser Shootout at Daytona International Speedway, his first win in the event. He narrowly beat Tony Stewart by 0.013 seconds, the closest margin in the event's history. Earlier in the race, Busch avoided a multi-car crash that left his brother Kurt involved and Jeff Gordon upside-down. His lone points race win that year came at Richmond's Capital City 400 in April, marking his fourth consecutive win in the event. He nearly claimed victory at Watkins Glen but spun on the final lap after hitting oil from Bobby Labonte's car, handing the win to Marcos Ambrose. Busch finished the season 7th in points and missed the Chase for the Sprint Cup, ending 13th overall.

He also went winless in the Nationwide and Camping World Truck Series. Despite missing the Chase, Busch performed well in the final ten races, earning seven top-5 finishes and leading significant laps in several events. At Dover, he led the most laps but lost the lead to Brad Keselowski after a late fuel stop. At Martinsville, he finished second to Jimmie Johnson after a close battle. At Phoenix, a late caution cost him the win, which went to Kevin Harvick. In the season finale at Homestead–Miami, Busch once again led the most laps but needed a late pit stop for fuel, allowing Jeff Gordon to take the win.

=== 2013: Return to the Chase ===
Heading into the 2013 season, Busch merged his No. 54 Nationwide Series team with Joe Gibbs Racing as part of a multi-year contract extension. He also continued to field his own No. 77 Toyota in the Nationwide Series, driven by Parker Kligerman.

Busch began the 2013 racing season with a crash during the Sprint Unlimited at Daytona International Speedway. Despite the setback, he rebounded by winning his Budweiser Duel qualifying race for the Daytona 500. In the Daytona 500 itself, Busch ran as high as second before blowing an engine after 150 of the race's 200 laps. At Phoenix International Raceway, Busch claimed victory in the Nationwide Series Dollar General 200, starting from the pole and breaking the second-longest winless streak of his career. Two weeks later at Bristol Motor Speedway, he narrowly won the Jeff Foxworthy's Grit Chips 300, edging out rookie Kyle Larson by less than 0.025 seconds. This victory tied him with Kevin Harvick for the most Nationwide Series wins at Bristol. That same weekend at Bristol, Busch earned the Sprint Cup pole position by setting a new track qualifying record. He went on to finish second in the race, overcoming a speeding penalty to challenge eventual winner Kasey Kahne.

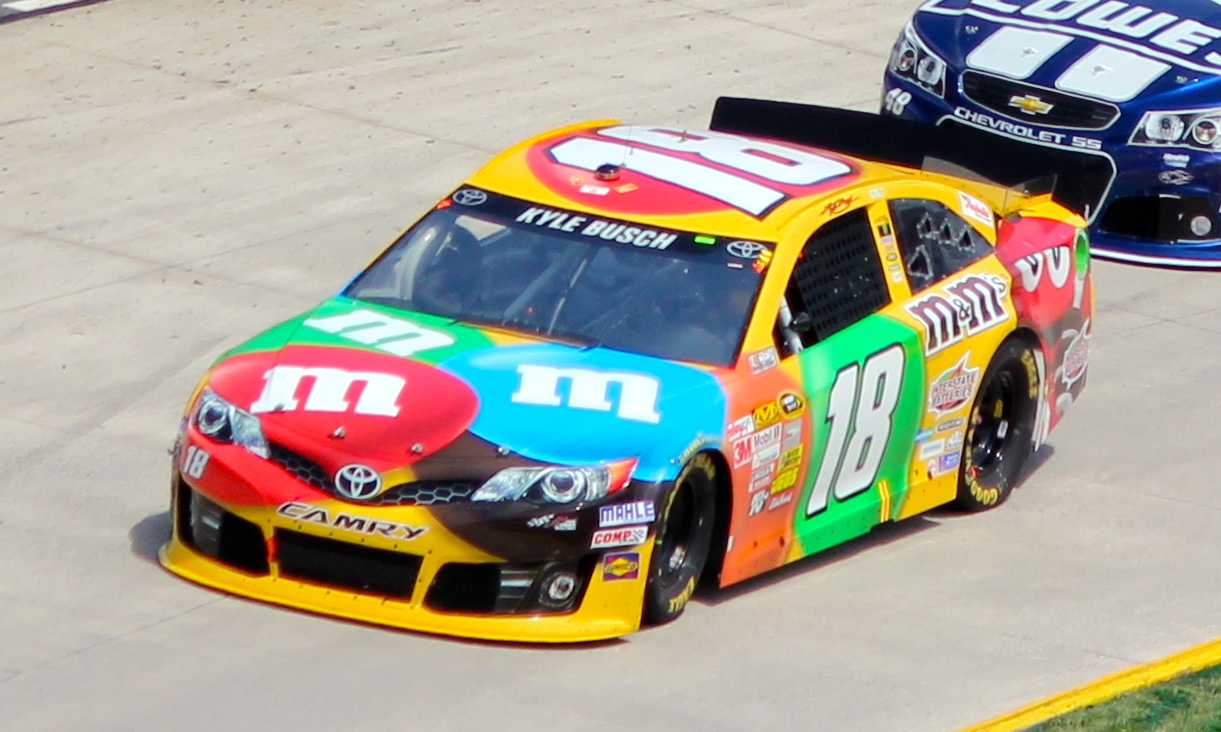
Busch competing in the 2013 STP Gas Booster 500.

At Fontana, Busch dominated the weekend, winning both the Nationwide and Sprint Cup races. In the Sprint Cup race, he passed a crashing Joey Logano and Denny Hamlin for the win. He earned his second Sprint Cup pole of the season at Texas, narrowly beating his brother Kurt, and swept both the Nationwide and Sprint Cup races at the track for his seventh career weekend sweep. At Kansas Speedway, Busch and Logano were involved in a heavy crash when Busch spun out and collided with the No. 22 car, destroying the front ends of both vehicles. Neither driver was injured, but the damage ended their races, with Busch finishing 38th and Logano 39th. Busch then placed 24th at Richmond and 37th at Talladega. At Darlington, Busch dominated the Southern 500 after winning the previous night’s Nationwide race but dropped to sixth at the finish due to a cut tire. It was later revealed the tire had only 12 pounds of air left at the end of the race.

At Charlotte in the Nationwide Series, Busch returned to Victory lane by claiming victory in the History 300 at Charlotte Motor Speedway. This win followed his triumph in the North Carolina Education Lottery 200 for the Camping World Truck Series the previous weekend. The next day, during the Coca-Cola 600 in the Sprint Cup Series, Busch started strong, having qualified 8th and taking the lead early in the race. However, on lap 121, a highly unusual incident occurred: a cable from a FOX Sports camera on the front straightaway snapped and fell onto the track near the turn 4 grandstands, injuring 10 spectators. Several cars, including those driven by Busch, Mark Martin, and Marcos Ambrose, ran over the cable, resulting in damage to the underside of their vehicles. A red flag was issued, and under normal conditions, crews are prohibited from working on cars during such stoppages. However, due to the widespread damage caused by the cable, NASCAR allowed teams 15 minutes to inspect and repair their cars if necessary. Once repairs were completed, the cars resumed their positions for the restart. Unfortunately, Busch's race ended prematurely on lap 258 when his engine blew, relegating him to a 38th-place finish.

Busch finished 4th in the Sprint Cup race at Dover the following weekend, followed by a 6th-place finish at Pocono Raceway and another 4th at Michigan International Speedway. However, he faced challenges at Sonoma Raceway, spinning twice during the first road-course event of the year and finishing 35th. He bounced back with a 5th-place finish at Kentucky Speedway and secured his first-ever pole at a restrictor-plate track in any NASCAR series at the Coke Zero 400 at Daytona International Speedway. Unfortunately, he was caught in a last-lap wreck, finishing 12th.

Busch secured his seventh Nationwide Series victory of the season at New Hampshire Motor Speedway, dominating the race by leading 130 of the 200 laps. The following day, he finished second in the Sprint Cup race but found himself in a heated feud with Ryan Newman. After an on-track incident involving his brother, Kurt Busch, Busch referred to Newman as "the biggest stupid idiot out there."

Two weeks later, Busch claimed victory in the Nationwide Series Indiana 250 at Indianapolis Motor Speedway. Starting from the pole, he led the most laps and overtook Brian Scott with two laps remaining to secure the win. Another two weeks later, he triumphed in the Sprint Cup Series race at Watkins Glen International, where a well-timed pit strategy helped him edge out Brad Keselowski and Martin Truex Jr. Following a 31st-place finish at Michigan, Busch dominated at Bristol Motor Speedway, winning both the Truck Series and Nationwide Series races. Despite starting last in the Sprint Cup race due to a qualifying spin, he managed an impressive eleventh-place finish.

After finishing second in the Nationwide Series race at Atlanta Motor Speedway, Busch claimed victory in the Sprint Cup Series AdvoCare 500 at the same track. He took the lead with 30 laps remaining and held off Joey Logano to secure the win, earning a spot in the Chase for the Sprint Cup. This marked Busch's 28th career win, tying him with Rex White for 23rd on the all-time wins list.

Busch concluded the regular season with a 19th-place finish at Richmond. He began the Chase with consecutive runner-up finishes to Matt Kenseth at Chicagoland and New Hampshire, followed by a solid fifth-place finish at Dover.

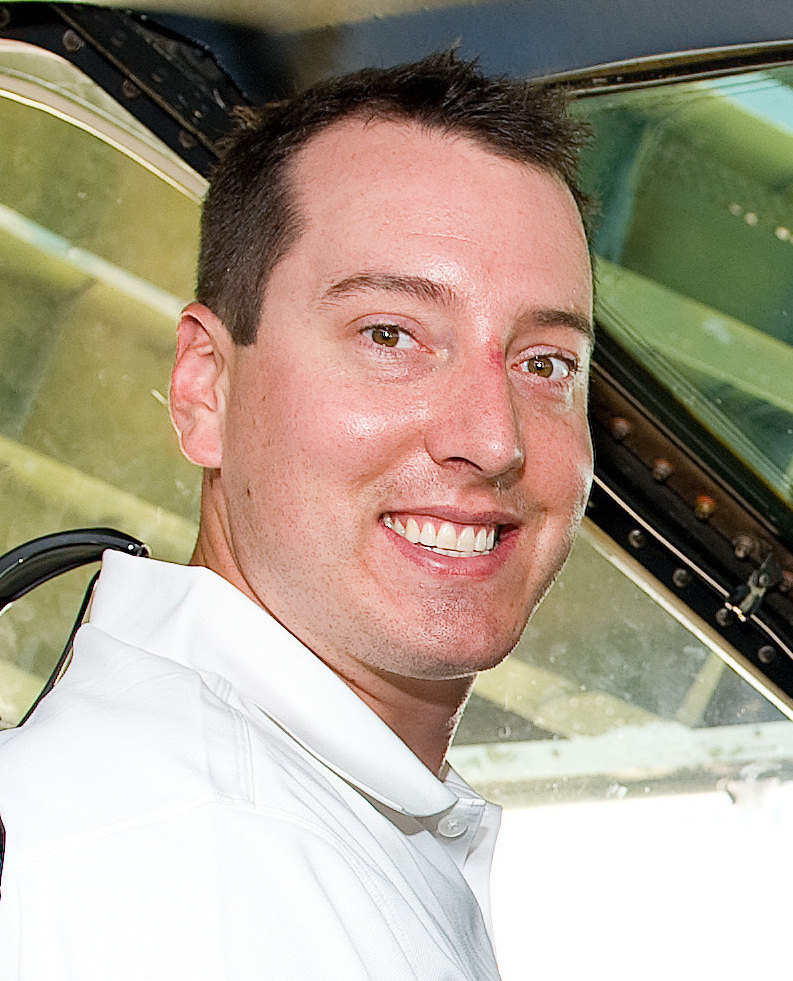
Busch in September 2013.

Busch's streak of bad luck at Kansas continued in the fall race. Both he and his brother, Kurt, crashed their primary cars during practice, forcing them to start from the back of the field in backup cars. While Kurt made an impressive charge through the field to finish second, Kyle's race took a turn for the worse almost immediately. On the first lap, he spun out in Turn 1 while trying to avoid a collision involving David Reutimann. Struggling with an ill-handling car for most of the race, Busch's troubles escalated on lap 188 when he was spun by Juan Pablo Montoya in Turn 4. Just 12 laps later, on a restart following Marcos Ambrose's spin, Busch's day came to an abrupt end. Contact from Carl Edwards sent him into Brian Vickers, causing Busch's car to shoot head-on into the Turn 2 wall. The heavy impact destroyed the front of his car and left him with a disappointing 34th-place finish.

On the final lap of the Camping World Truck Series Fred's 250 at Talladega, Busch endured a heavy crash, slamming hard into the inside wall. Despite the incident, he managed to finish 10th in the race. During his post-race interview, Busch described the crash, saying there were, "a couple of really good licks I took." Visibly shaken, he sat against the outside concrete wall after exiting his truck, explaining, "there's no sense in sitting in a hot vehicle, you might as well get out and get some fresh air." Remarkably, Busch competed in the Cup Series race the following day, where he finished 5th. He went on to place fourth in the final points standings, marking the best finish of his career at that time.

=== 2014: Good Nationwide Season, Lackluster Cup Season ===
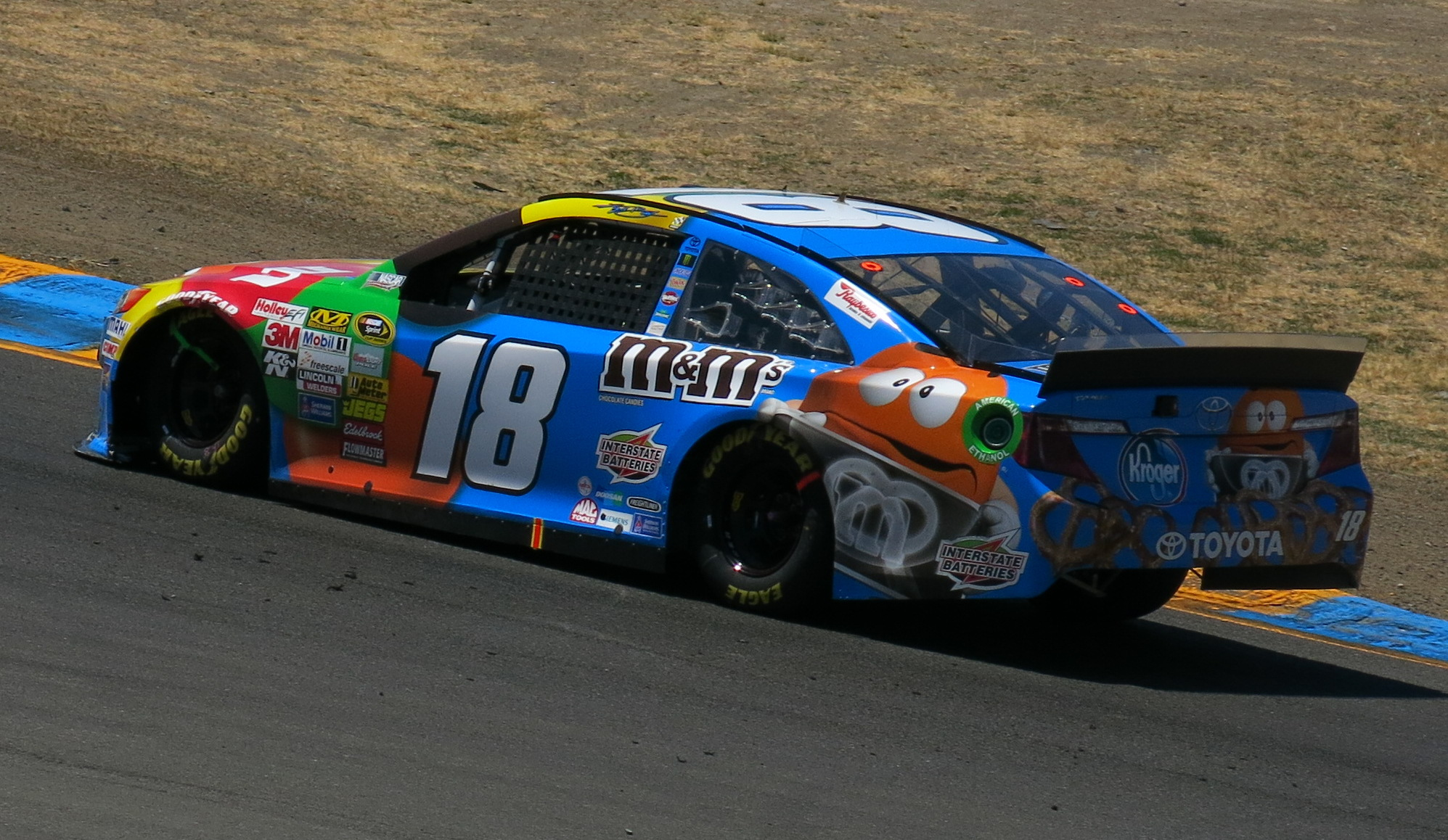
Busch racing at Sonoma Raceway in 2014

In 2014, Busch announced that he would drive the No. 54 car part-time in the Nationwide Series for Joe Gibbs Racing, sharing the ride with Sam Hornish Jr. He also revealed plans to drive the No. 51 truck part-time for 10 races in the Camping World Truck Series, with Erik Jones driving the other 12 races.

Busch's first highlight of the season came at Daytona in the NASCAR Truck Series race. He took the lead midway through the 100-lap event after leader Ben Kennedy ran out of fuel. Busch led for 25 laps, but with five laps remaining, Timothy Peters passed him. However, with assistance from Ron Hornaday Jr. and Ryan Truex, Busch executed a high-line move and managed to edge Peters out by an inch in a thrilling photo finish for the win.

Busch led some laps during the Daytona 500 and was running in 4th on the final lap when he got involved in an accident with his former arch-rival, Kevin Harvick. Harvick apologized for causing the wreck, but both he and Busch criticized the track for lacking safer barriers on the front stretch. In a post-race interview, Busch hinted that the crash was the hardest impact he had ever experienced in a race car. Despite the severe damage to his car, Busch crossed the finish line backward on the pit road, ultimately finishing 19th.

The following week at Phoenix, Busch was running in second with 65 laps to go, but he and then-leader Ryan Newman lost their chance at the win when they were forced to pit during an untimely caution. Despite this setback, both Newman and Busch managed to recover and finish in the top ten.

On March 23, 2014, at Auto Club Speedway, Busch started 14th and was running fifth on the final restart. His older brother, Kurt Busch, seemed to have the win secured, but a fierce battle for the lead between Kurt and Tony Stewart allowed Busch to catch up. He passed both of them on the final lap, holding off rookie Kyle Larson to secure the victory.

At Richmond, Busch finished 3rd after a remarkable charge from 16th place to 3rd on the final restart, aided by four fresh tires. At Talladega, Busch seemed to have a dominant car but was involved in a multi-car pileup triggered by Brad Keselowski, who was racing aggressively while 6 laps down. Busch and several other drivers, especially after Keselowski had previously criticized teammate Matt Kenseth for aggressive driving at Richmond, expressed their anger towards Keselowski in post-wreck interviews. Keselowski later apologized for his role in the accident.

In the All-Star Race at Charlotte, Busch dominated early, winning US$50,000 for taking Segment 1. However, his race took a turn in Segment 2 when he was involved in an accident with Joey Logano. While battling his older brother Kurt, Kyle collided with Clint Bowyer, spinning out. As he slid back down the track, he was hit hard by Logano, in a crash reminiscent of his 2013 spring wreck at Kansas. After the impact, Busch famously attempted to walk to the infield hospital to regain his composure, but an ambulance was sent to escort him to the hospital instead.

Busch had an outstanding Nationwide Series season, winning 7 of 26 races and finishing in the top 5 in 25 of them, with an average finish of 2.8. He shared the No. 54 car with Sam Hornish Jr., delivering numerous victories. Busch won at Phoenix, holding off Kevin Harvick after a rain delay made the race official. He also triumphed at Bristol, fending off Kyle Larson in a repeat of the 2013 race. Busch ended Joey Logano's Dover streak on May 31, 2014, beating Trevor Bayne by 9 seconds after a tight battle. At Richmond in the fall, Busch won every lap of the 250-lap race, marking his second Nationwide Series victory while leading every lap.

During the spring and early summer, Busch had impressive results in the Truck Series. In the first five races he entered, he dominated, winning all of them. Busch led the most laps in four of those races, and four victories came from starting on the pole.

In June 2014, Busch led 31 laps of the Quaker State 400 but was passed by Brad Keselowski with 16 laps remaining. Busch finished second, but in an interview, he expressed that after a 10-week streak of bad luck, the runner-up result felt like a victory. The finish also moved Busch back into the top ten in points, up from 12th before the Kentucky race.

At Daytona, Busch ran in the top ten for most of the race, but disaster struck halfway through when "the big one" occurred. Busch was clipped by Justin Allgaier and Denny Hamlin, then t-boned by Cole Whitt, which sent him flipping onto his roof. Despite the harrowing crash, Busch was mostly unharmed and even joked on his radio while upside down, saying, "Just having a good old time over here," with his spotter responding, "Just hanging around?" Busch bounced back the following week by winning the pole for the Camping World RV Sales 301, a race at a track where he's finished second multiple times and won in 2006. He ultimately finished second to Keselowski.

At the Brickyard 400, Busch finished second for the second consecutive year, with Jeff Gordon pulling away to claim the win. Busch then endured a rough streak, finishing 36th or worse in four consecutive races. At Bristol, Busch seemed to have a dominant car but was involved in a multi-car wreck on lap 117 after leading several laps. He later experienced axle issues, causing him to retire early. Tensions rose between Busch and his crew chief, Dave Rogers, who argued with Busch over the radio. In frustration, Rogers told Busch to "take your whiny little ass to the bus." Later, Rogers apologized, explaining that he had misunderstood Busch's complaints due to radio communication issues.

At Atlanta the following week, Busch and Martin Truex Jr. wrecked while racing with three laps to go, bringing out a caution. The two exchanged heated words in the garage afterward. Busch made the Chase for the second consecutive year. At Chicago, Busch won the truck race despite making two errors. He led 46 laps in the Cup race and finished 7th.

Busch arrived in Kansas feeling nervous, due to a history of struggles and bad luck. However, he triumphed in the Nationwide race and finished third in the Cup race the following day. Just as the checkered flag fell, his luck ran out—his engine expired right after completing the 400-mile race. Busch commented afterward that the third-place finish at what he considered his worst track felt like a championship to him.

Busch advanced to the second round of the first elimination-format Chase. Despite entering Talladega in second place in points, a crash on lap 103, where he was rear-ended by rookie Austin Dillon, took him out of contention. The incident resulted in a 40th-place finish, dropping Busch to 10th in points, below the 8th-place cutline.Busch's results in the Chase declined after failing to advance to the next round, ultimately finishing 10th in the standings.

At the end of the 2014 season, Busch and crew chief Dave Rogers parted ways. During the offseason crew chief shuffle, Busch was paired with his Xfinity Series crew chief, Adam Stevens, while Rogers transitioned to work with Denny Hamlin.

He won a Nationwide race at Kansas and came close to winning another at Phoenix, only to be passed by Brad Keselowski on the final lap. Busch's team, Kyle Busch Motorsports, dominated the Truck Series in 2014, claiming the most wins and securing the owner's championship for a second consecutive year. After teammate Bubba Wallace won a race, the two celebrated together with donuts on the front stretch.

=== 2015: First Cup Series Championship ===
On February 10, 2015, Busch announced he would skip the Truck Series race at Daytona to focus on the Daytona 500. During the second Budweiser Duel, Busch dominated the first half of the race but received a stop-and-go penalty for speeding on pit road. He restarted in 23rd but quickly recovered, climbing back to the front within 15 laps and finishing second behind Jimmie Johnson.

==== Daytona injury ====
On February 21, 2015, Busch was involved in a multi-car accident with eight laps remaining in the Xfinity Series race at Daytona International Speedway. The crash occurred exiting the tri-oval when Busch bounced off Kyle Larson, slid into the infield grass, and slammed head-on into a concrete wall at an estimated speed of 90 mph (140 km/h). The wall was not equipped with a SAFER barrier. Busch exited his car with assistance from medical and track officials before lying on the ground to receive medical attention for his injuries. He was then placed on a stretcher and transported to Halifax Medical Center for further evaluation. Doctors later diagnosed Busch with a compound fracture in his lower right leg, a small fracture in his left foot, and a sprained left finger. Despite the injury, NASCAR granted him a medical waiver, allowing him to remain eligible for the championship as long as he met the playoff qualification rules.

==== Return and the road to the championship ====
On May 12, 2015, Busch announced on Twitter that he would return to NASCAR at the Sprint All-Star Race at Charlotte on May 16. Nearly four months after his injury, he claimed victory in the Xfinity Series race at Michigan on June 13, 2015, in just his second start of the season. To qualify for the Chase in 2015, Busch needed to secure a win in the Sprint Cup Series and rank within the top 30 in points.

Busch had an eventful return to the Sprint Cup Series. He placed 11th in the Coca-Cola 600 but faced setbacks, including a 36th-place finish at Dover after a late-race crash and a last-place finish at Michigan following a wreck. However, he rebounded with a win at Sonoma, capitalizing on fresher tires after a late caution to hold off his brother Kurt Busch and Clint Bowyer. On July 11, 2015, Busch won at Kentucky, moving him within 87 points of the top 30 in the standings, crucial for Chase eligibility. His victory also prevented Jeff Gordon from achieving wins at every active NASCAR track in his final full-time season. A week later, Busch secured another win at New Hampshire, narrowing the gap to 58 points. A bold move to regain a lap and capitalize on a late caution secured his third win in four races. At Indianapolis, Busch captured the prestigious Brickyard 400, completing a weekend sweep after winning the Xfinity race and marking his first career streak of three consecutive Cup Series wins. This performance left him just 23 points shy of Chase eligibility.

Busch secured his spot in the Chase with one race remaining. During the first round, he recorded two top-10 finishes, allowing him to advance to the second round. However, his hopes of moving further were severely impacted at Charlotte. Busch had been running second behind teammate Matt Kenseth for much of the race when he and Kyle Larson collided while entering pit road, spinning Larson and taking both drivers out of contention for the win. Later, Busch hit the wall multiple times in the final 50 laps due to oil on the track, caused by Justin Allgaier's No. 51 car losing its transmission after an earlier collision. After the race, Busch, along with other drivers like Dale Earnhardt Jr., criticized NASCAR for not addressing the oil on the track during those closing laps.

==== Winning the championship ====
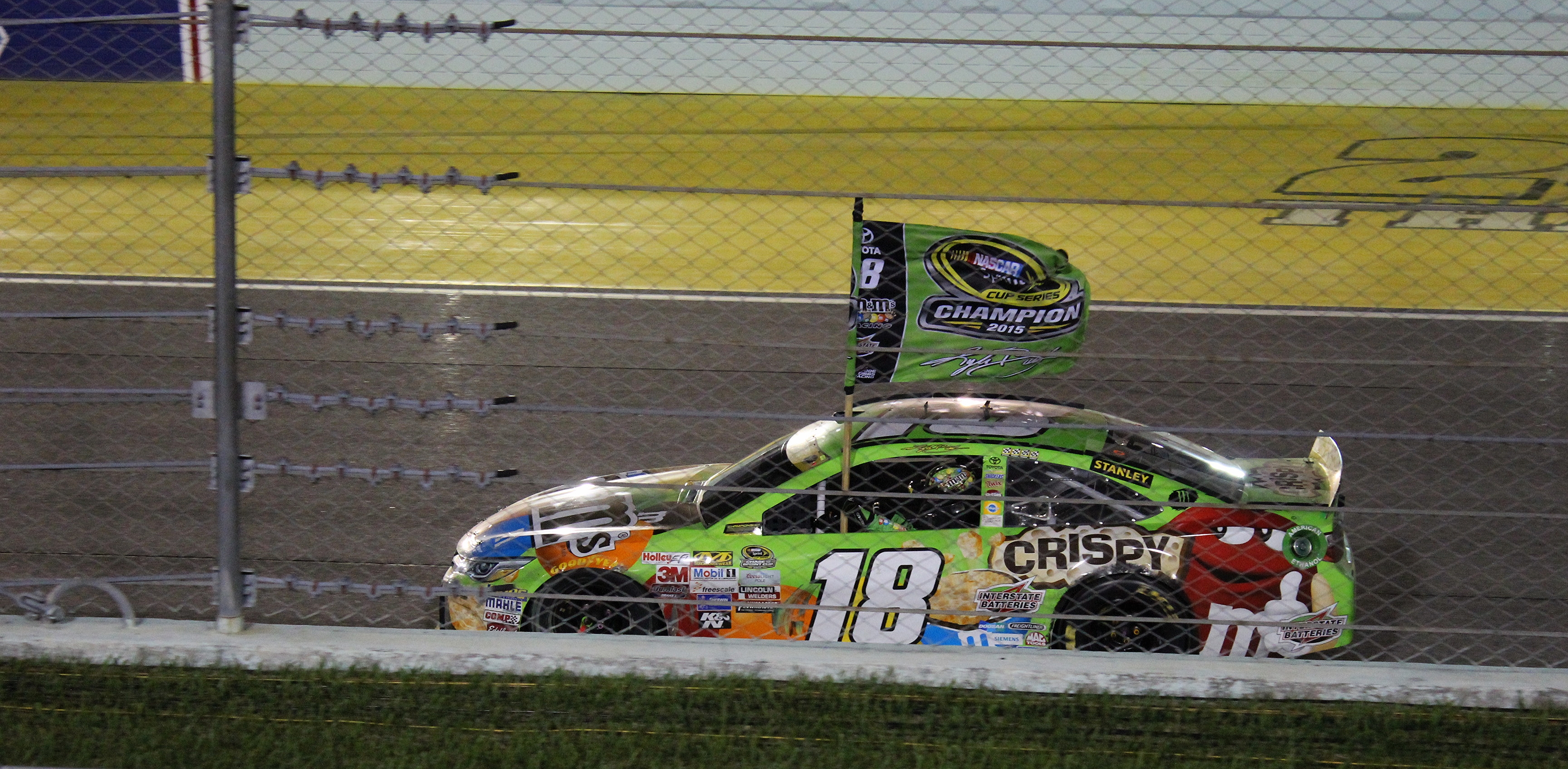
Busch celebrating after winning the 2015 NASCAR Sprint Cup Series Championship.

On November 15, 2015, Kyle Busch secured a spot in the Championship Four for the final Chase race at Homestead. Just days later, on November 20, his team, Kyle Busch Motorsports, claimed the Camping World Truck Series championship with Erik Jones, making Busch the owner’s champion. On November 22, 2015, Busch competed in the Ford EcoBoost 400, where he emerged victorious, capturing his first-ever NASCAR Sprint Cup Series championship. He ended the season with an impressive record: five wins, twelve top-five finishes, and sixteen top-ten finishes, despite only competing in 25 of the 36 races that year.

=== 2016: Championship Defense ===
Before the 2016 season, Busch announced that he would no longer compete in Xfinity or Camping World Truck Series restrictor plate races due to his crash at Daytona in 2015. He began the season with a 17th-place finish in the Sprint Unlimited after crashing with less than five laps remaining. Busch won his Can-Am Duel, securing a front-row start for the Daytona 500. However, his teammate Matt Kenseth, who initially qualified second, was forced to start from the back after wrecking his car in the Duel. Busch finished third in the Daytona 500. Following the race, Busch expressed his goal of achieving 200 wins across NASCAR's three national touring series, tying Richard Petty's record. On February 27, 2016, he won the Xfinity Series' Heads Up Georgia 250 at Atlanta Motor Speedway. The following week at Las Vegas Motor Speedway, Busch dominated the Boyd Gaming 300, leading all but one lap and surpassing 16,000 career Xfinity Series laps led shortly before a red flag was issued around lap 163.

During the Kobalt 400, Busch appeared poised for victory, leading with 13 laps to go. However, he reported a vibration in his right-front tire and feared it might fail. This issue caused him to fall behind Brad Keselowski, Joey Logano, and Jimmie Johnson, ultimately finishing fourth at his hometown track despite starting 23rd. At Phoenix, Busch secured his third consecutive Xfinity Series win, dominating by leading 175 of 200 laps to claim his 79th career victory. The following day, he started on the pole for the Good Sam 500 and finished fourth.

During the final lap of the TreatMyClot.com 300 at Auto Club Speedway, Busch ran over a piece of debris, blowing his left front tire. This caused him to lose the lead to his Joe Gibbs Racing teammate Daniel Suárez, who soon ran out of fuel. Despite racing on only three tires, Busch managed to regain the lead, but in the final corner, Austin Dillon passed him to win the race. Afterward, Busch criticized NASCAR for not throwing a caution, sparking speculation that he implied the race was rigged. Along with his controversial radio comments, Busch refused to participate in media interviews and was accused by Dillon of attempting to wreck him during the race. As a result, NASCAR fined Busch US$10,000 and placed him on four weeks of probation. While rumors circulated that Busch apologized to NASCAR, this was never confirmed.

After returning from Easter/Spring Break and the incident at Auto Club, Busch secured his first-ever win at Martinsville in any NASCAR series during the Camping World Truck Series race, starting 2nd and finishing 1st in his 31st attempt. The next day, he dominated the STP 500, starting 7th, leading 352 of 500 laps, and sweeping the weekend. The victory clinched his spot in the NASCAR Chase for the Sprint Cup. In his race interview, Busch addressed critics of his participation in lower NASCAR series. His Truck Series win marked a milestone, making him the first driver to win in all three of NASCAR's top divisions at every Sprint Cup track. His Cup win at Martinsville left only Charlotte, Kansas, and Pocono on his list of tracks to conquer (he later won at Kansas in the spring).

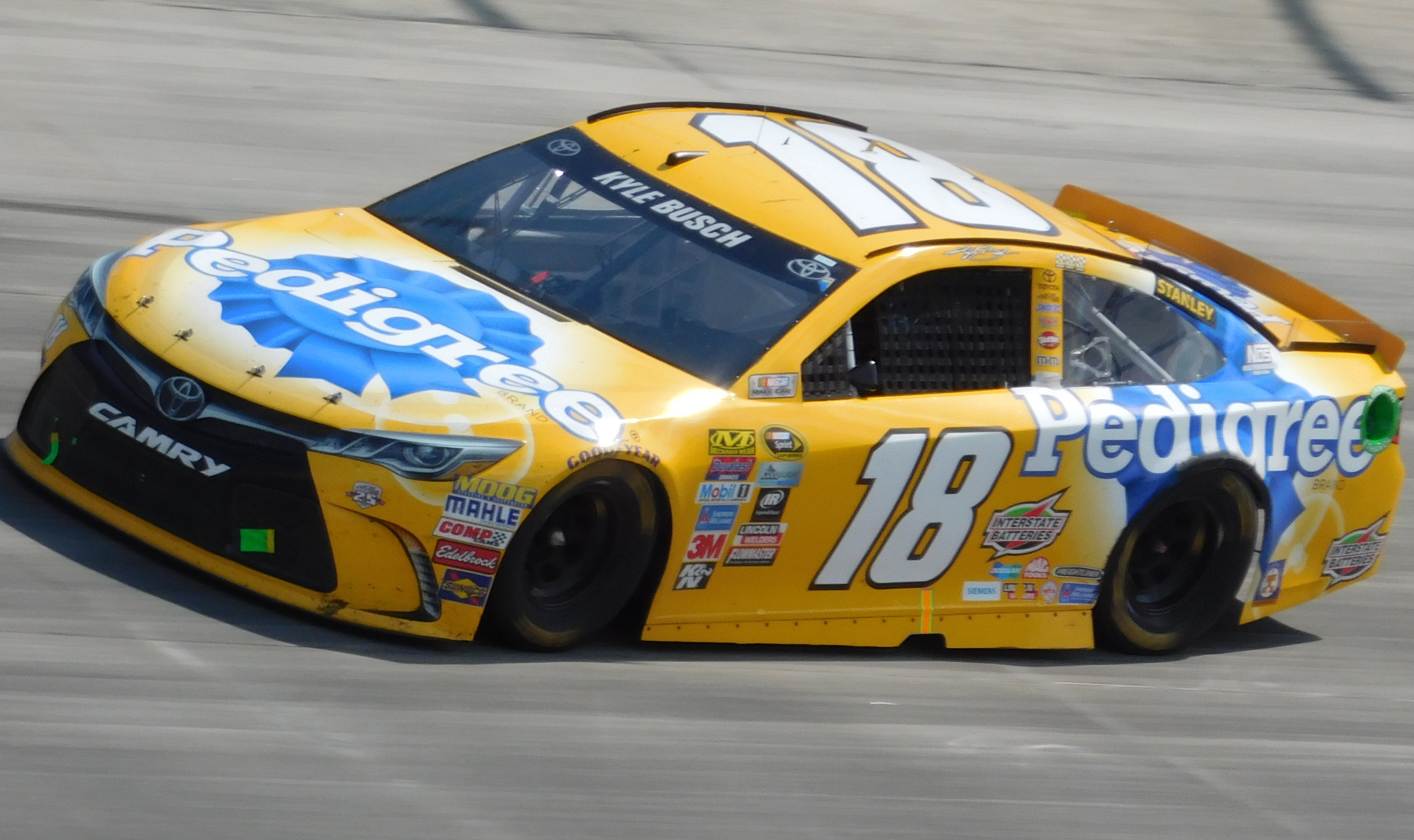
Kyle Busch racing at the 2016 AAA 400 Drive for Autism.

A week later, Busch dominated at Texas Motor Speedway, winning both the Xfinity Series (O'Reilly Auto Parts 300) and Cup Series (Duck Commander 500) races. These victories fueled ongoing controversy about Sprint Cup drivers competing in the Xfinity and Truck Series. His Xfinity win marked his 80th career victory in the series and his 160th across NASCAR's three top touring series combined. The following day, his Cup Series win propelled him to 1st place in the standings.

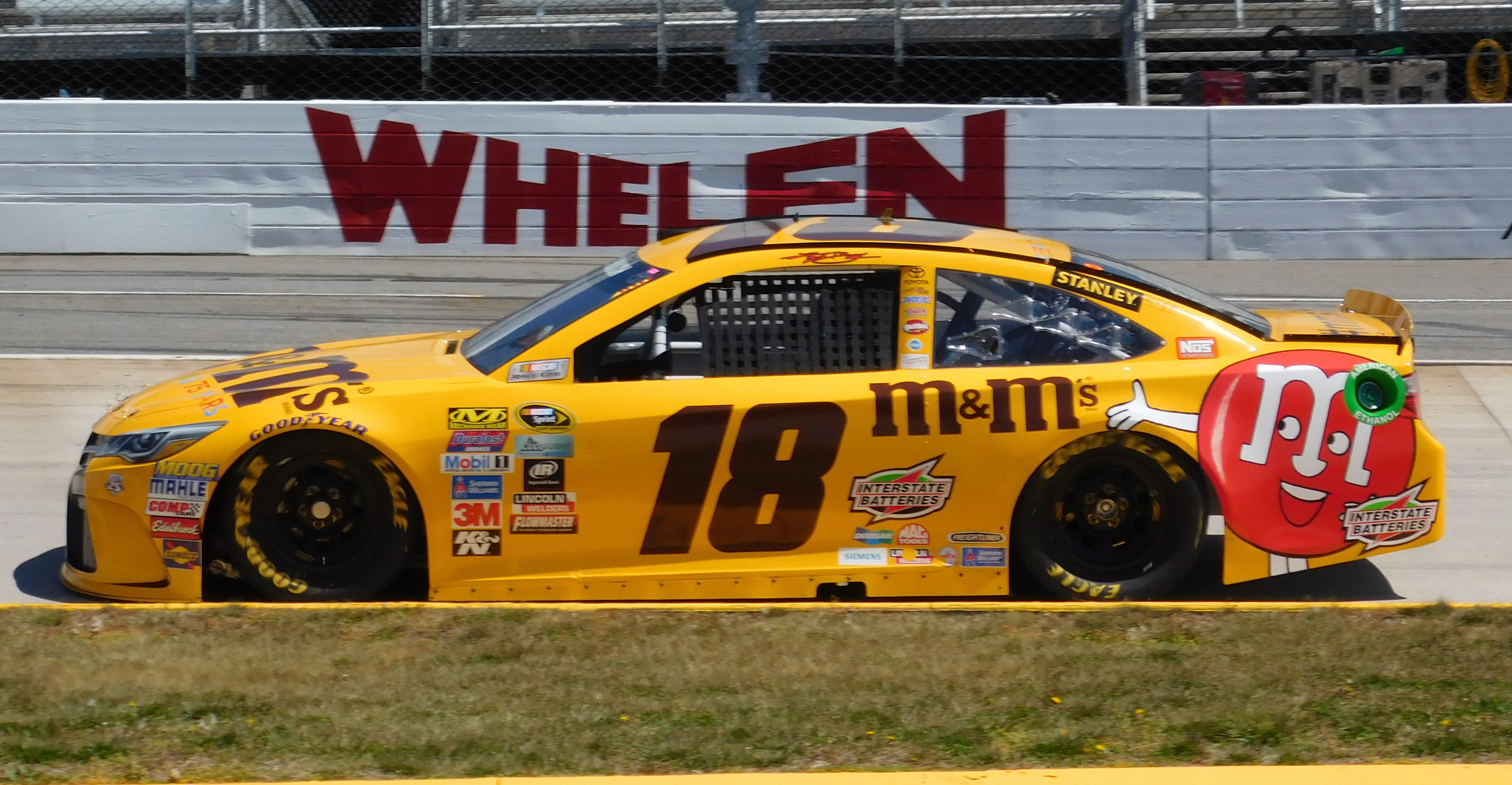
Kyle Busch racing at Martinsville Speedway at the 2016 STP 500(who later won the race).

The following week at Bristol Motor Speedway was tough for Busch. After finishing 2nd in the Xfinity race, he endured a 38th-place finish in the Cup race due to multiple tire failures. At Richmond’s Toyota Owners 400, Busch was passed by teammate Carl Edwards on the final lap, finishing 2nd. The next week at Talladega, Busch avoided several wrecks to finish 2nd to Brad Keselowski in his 400th career race, just one day before his birthday. During post-race interviews, Busch criticized NASCAR for racing at superspeedway tracks like Daytona and Talladega, citing safety concerns. The race saw two cars flip, another nearly overturn, and four massive crashes ("Big Ones") that left 35 of the 40 cars with damage. At the Go Bowling 400 in Kansas, Busch capitalized on pit strategy to lead the final 40 laps and secure his first career win at the track, despite his past struggles there (four DNFs and only one top-5 finish). He edged out Kevin Harvick after polesitter Martin Truex Jr., who had dominated the race, suffered pit issues and finished 14th. The victory made Busch the first driver in 2016 to claim three wins, leaving Charlotte and Pocono as the only tracks where he had yet to win.

After his win at Kansas, Busch endured a rough stretch, recording four finishes of 30th or worse. Following a 40th-place result at Michigan, Busch and the #18 team used the off-week to regroup, bouncing back with a solid 7th-place finish at Sonoma Raceway. The momentum continued the next week at Daytona, where Busch finished second to Keselowski despite driving a backup car after a hard crash in practice before qualifying. At Kentucky Speedway, Busch won the Xfinity Series race, but in the Cup Series event the following day, he finished 12th in a fuel mileage race after running in the top 5 late before pitting for fuel. The next week in New Hampshire, Busch once again claimed victory in the Xfinity Series race. In the Cup race, he led the most laps but struggled on late restarts, ultimately finishing 8th behind teammate and race winner Matt Kenseth.

The following week at Indianapolis Motor Speedway, Busch made NASCAR history by becoming the first driver to sweep both poles and win both races in the same weekend at the same track. In the Xfinity Series' Lilly Diabetes 250, Busch dominated, leading nearly every lap and taking the win from the pole position. It marked his third consecutive Xfinity Series victory and his 83rd career win in the series. The following day, in the Brickyard 400, Busch once again dominated, leading 149 of the 170 laps. After surviving several late-race restarts, he secured his second consecutive Brickyard 400 victory. This win was his 38th career Cup Series victory, fourth of the season, and second career triumph at Indianapolis.

Busch dominated the Bristol race in August, leading an impressive 252 of the first 419 laps—57% of the race. However, during the final quarter, handling issues forced him to head to the garage. On his way there, Busch was t-boned by a crashing Justin Allgaier, who was competing in a one-off race for HScott Motorsports. The collision ended Busch's race. In his post-race interview, Busch expressed frustration with Allgaier and his spotter, referring to them as "The biggest morons out there." Despite the setback, Busch rebounded to make the Championship Four at Homestead–Miami Speedway, ultimately finishing third in the standings.

=== 2017: Third Championship Four Appearance ===
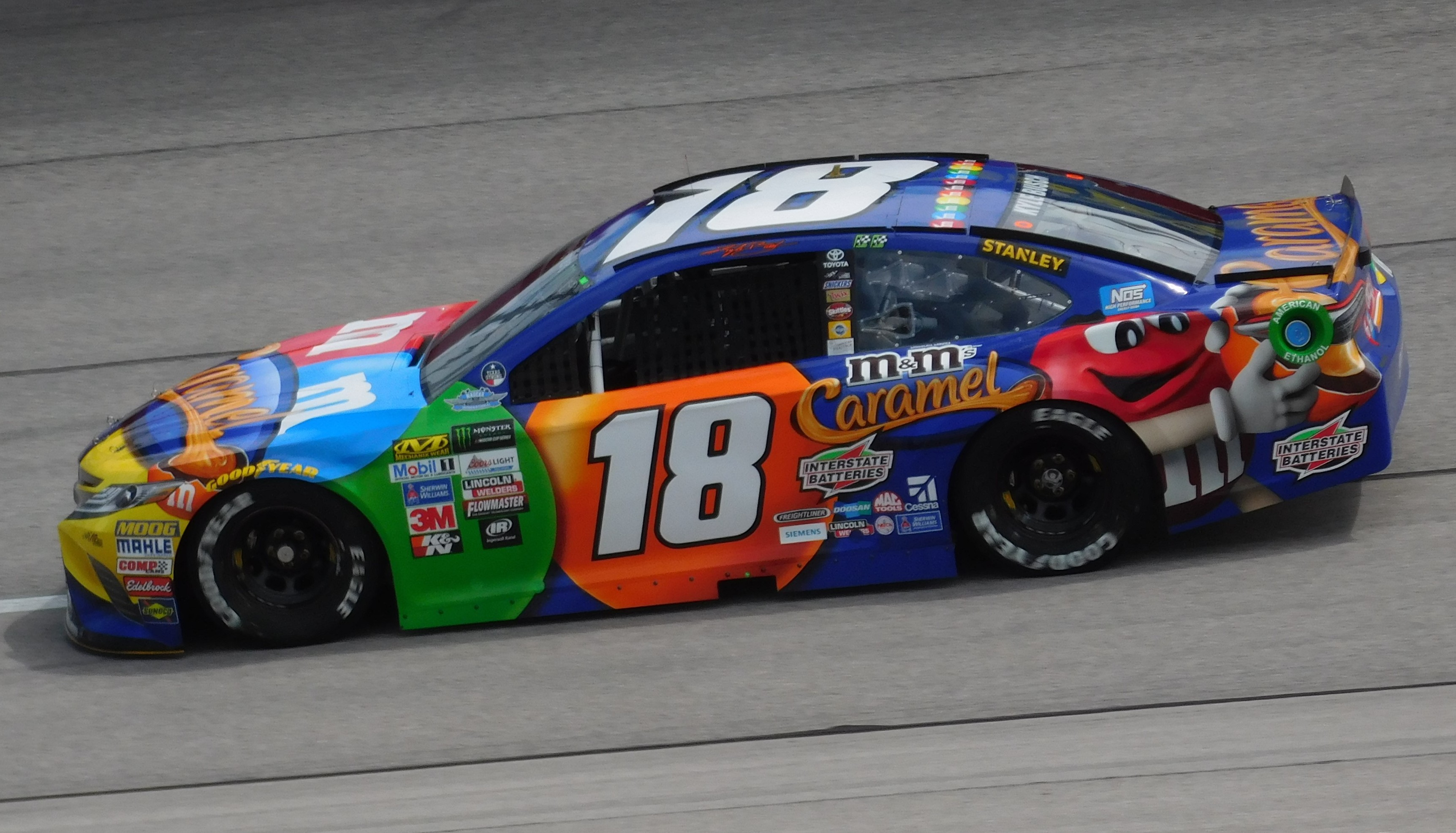
Busch racing at Darlington Raceway in 2017.

Busch started the 2017 season on a slow note when he wrecked in the Daytona 500 after his rear tire lost air, spinning him and collecting race leader Dale Earnhardt Jr. In his interview, Busch criticized Goodyear's tires, saying they "aren't very good at holding air."

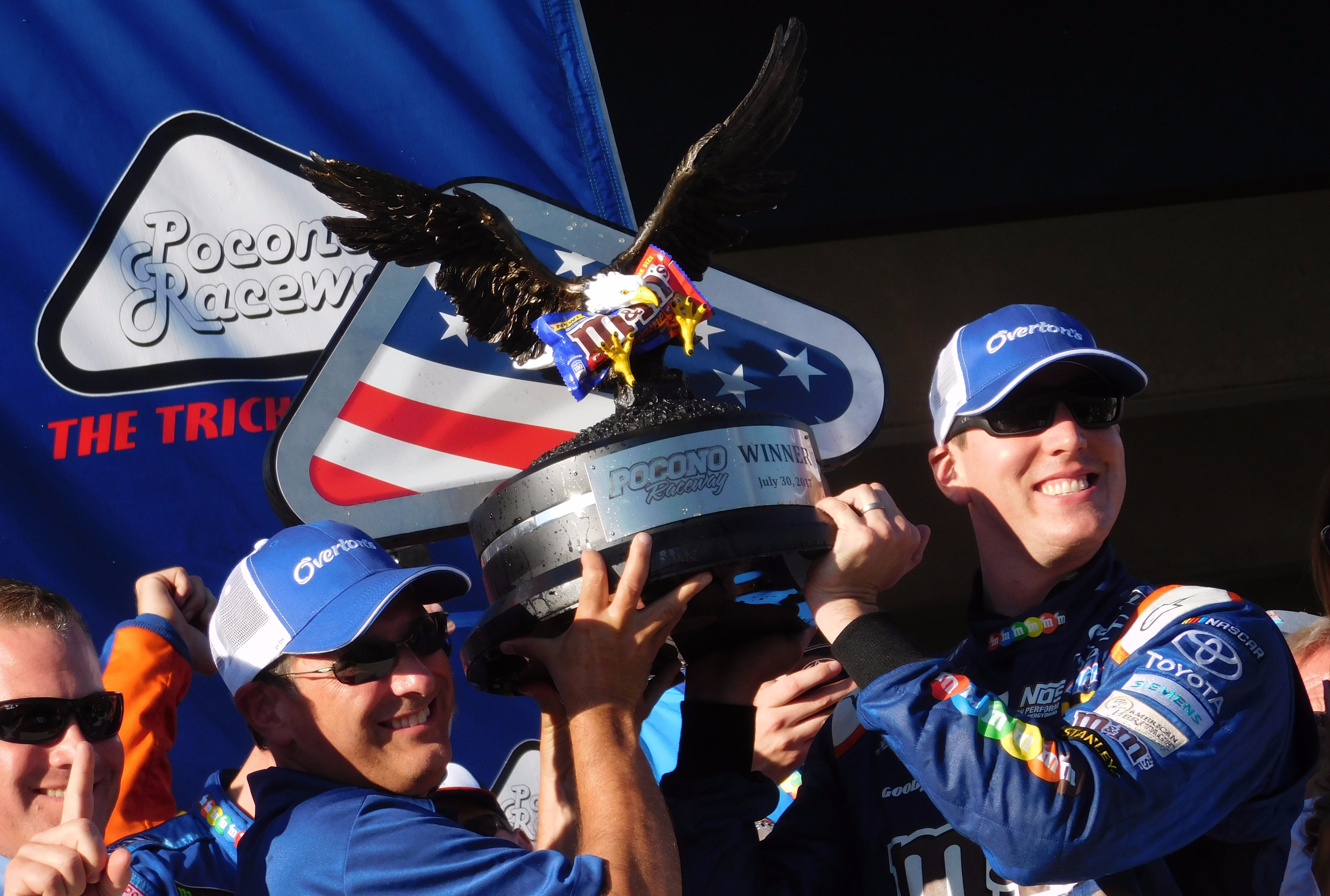
Busch after winning the 2017 Overton's 400.

In the Kobalt 400 at Las Vegas, Busch and Joey Logano collided while battling for a top-five finish on the final lap. The contact sent Busch spinning onto pit road, dropping him to 22nd, while Logano finished in fourth. After the race, Busch confronted Logano on pit road. Before they could exchange words, Busch threw a punch, though it was unclear if it landed. Logano and his crew quickly took Busch to the ground, resulting in a bloody forehead for Busch. In a post-race interview, Busch said, "I got dumped, flat-out dumped. He just drove straight into the corner and wrecked me. That's how Joey races, so he's gonna get it." Neither driver was penalized for the altercation.

The following week at Phoenix, Busch led a race-high 114 laps and was in position to win before a late caution due to Logano's tire failure, Busch finished third. Busch finished 8th at Auto Club Speedway and led a race-high 274 laps at Martinsville but finished 2nd to Brad Keselowski. He won the All-Star Race at Charlotte on May 20 and finished 2nd in the Coca-Cola 600. At Indianapolis, Busch led the first two stages but crashed with Truex in the third stage, ending both drivers' races. Busch, with 1,000+ laps led in 2017, won his first Pocono race in July after starting from the pole. He swept the Bristol weekend in August, winning all stages in the truck and Xfinity races, and holding off Erik Jones to win the Cup race. Busch also helped Hamlin win the Southern 500 two weeks later.

Busch made the playoffs with two wins. He won the pole at Chicagoland but finished outside the top five due to a pit road penalty. The following week, Busch won the ISM Connect 300 from the pole, leading the most laps, which advanced him to the next round of the playoffs. Busch claimed another victory at Dover, passing Chase Elliott on the final lap. He held off Toyota teammate Truex as they crossed the line, with a wreck occurring behind them. Busch secured his second career Martinsville victory just three races later and made it to the final four at Homestead. However, he couldn't get past Martin Truex Jr. in the closing laps, finishing second in both the race and the final point standings.

=== 2018: First Official Regular Season Title, Fourth Championship Four Appearance ===
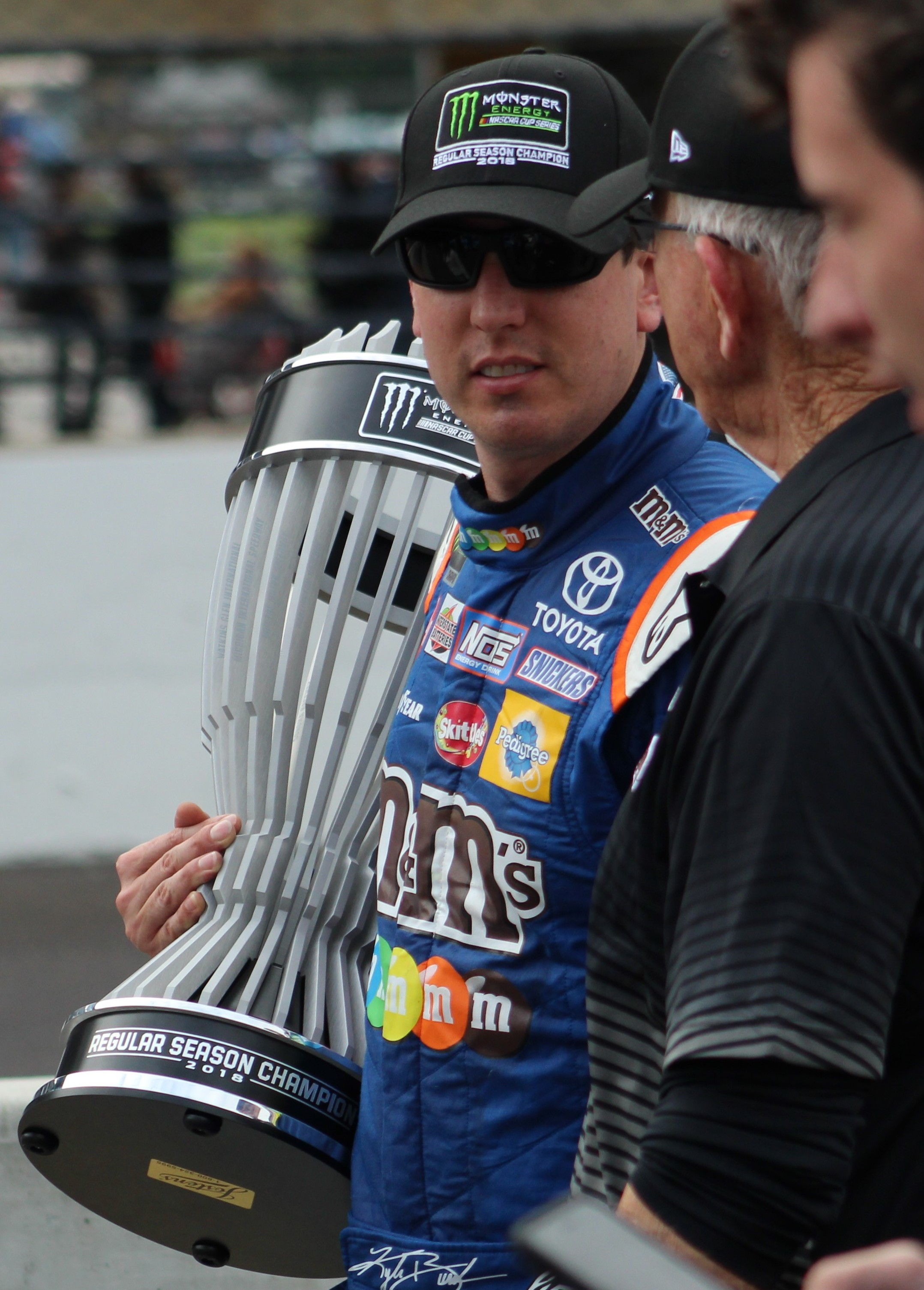
Busch holding the Regular Season Championship trophy after the 2018 Brickyard 400

Busch's quest for redemption began at the Daytona 500, where he wrecked after blowing a tire. However, he managed to make it down pit road to fix his car and finished in 25th place. Busch then achieved a major milestone by winning the Truck Series race in Las Vegas, marking his first victory there since 2001. With this win, Busch became the first driver to win at his home track in all three major NASCAR touring series. He followed the win with back-to-back runner-up finishes in the Cup Series at Las Vegas and Phoenix, both times finishing behind Kevin Harvick, despite leading the most laps in the latter race. Busch then finished third at Auto Club Speedway behind Martin Truex Jr. and second at Martinsville behind Clint Bowyer. Busch secured his first win of the season at Texas in April, and followed that up with another victory at Bristol, where he used a bump-and-run maneuver against Kyle Larson in the closing laps.

Busch won his third consecutive race at Richmond, starting 32nd, marking his first three-win streak since 2015. He finished 13th at Talladega after running as high as second. In the Coca-Cola 600 at Charlotte, Busch dominated, securing his first win there and becoming the first driver to win at every track he's raced on in the Cup Series. The following week at Pocono, he led the most laps and won the Xfinity Series race, completing a win at every active Xfinity track. At Chicagoland, Busch beat Kyle Larson for the win with a bump-and-run. At Daytona, a spin caused by Ricky Stenhouse Jr. left him 33rd. Two weeks later at New Hampshire, he finished second after being moved by Kevin Harvick late in the race. The following week at Pocono, Busch started 27th, but pit strategy and strong racing put him in front of Harvick and Daniel Suárez for his 6th win of the season. At Watkins Glen, a fuel issue during the final pit stop dropped him to the back, but he recovered to finish 3rd. At Bristol, Busch spun early, went two laps down, and recovered to finish 20th after a series of incidents. After the Brickyard 400, Busch clinched the 2018 Regular Season Championship. He later won his 50th career Cup Series race at Richmond, becoming the only driver in history with 50+ wins in all three top series. Busch reached the Championship 4 after winning at Phoenix and finished 4th in the standings.

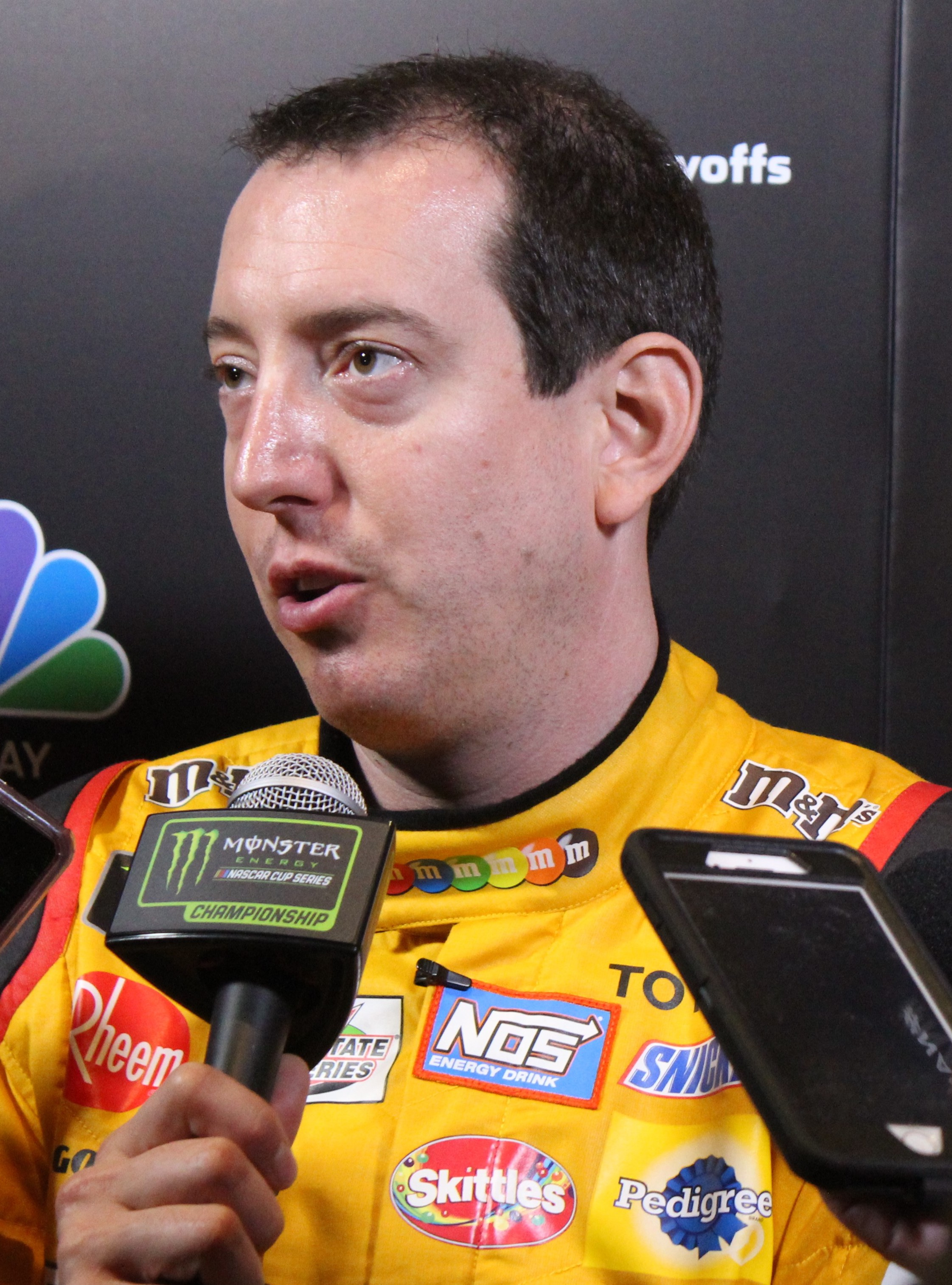
Busch in November 2018

=== 2019: 2nd Cup Championship, 200th Overall Win ===
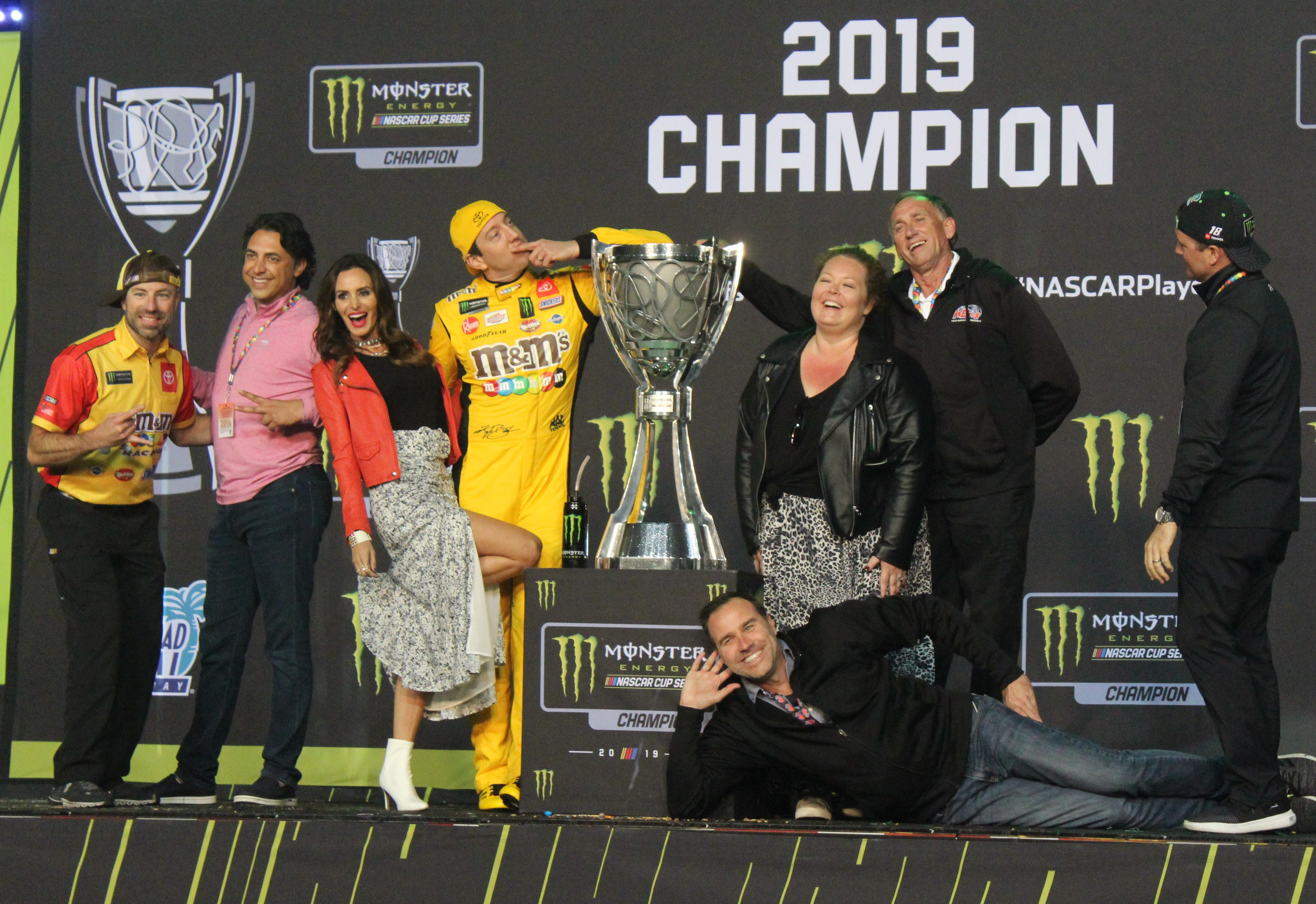
Busch after winning the 2019 Monster Energy NASCAR Cup Series Championship

Busch began the season with a second-place finish in the Daytona 500. He also secured Truck Series wins at Atlanta, Las Vegas, and Texas, as well as Xfinity Series victories at Las Vegas, ISM Raceway, Texas, and Indianapolis.

His first Cup Series win of the season came early in the fourth race at ISM Raceway. In the next race, Busch secured his 200th victory across NASCAR's top three divisions at Auto Club Speedway, sweeping both stages and leading the most laps. He went on to win his final two Truck Series races at Martinsville and Charlotte, finishing the season undefeated in the five races he entered. After being hit from behind early in the race at Bristol, he held off his brother, Kurt, to win his 8th race there. Busch also tied Rusty Wallace's career win total of 55 with his victory in the Pocono 400 at Pocono.

In July at Kentucky Speedway, Kurt Busch held off his brother Kyle in a thrilling shootout finish, with the two racing side by side for the win. The elder Busch prevailed, marking the third time the brothers finished 1-2 in a Cup race. Kyle remained consistent throughout the summer, closing in on Joey Logano for the Regular Season Championship. After the Southern 500 at Darlington Raceway, Kyle clinched his second consecutive Regular Season Championship with a third-place finish, despite cutting a tire with less than three laps to go while battling for the win and scraping the wall. Although an engine failure at Indianapolis ended his day early, Busch secured his second consecutive Regular Season Championship, finishing the season with 21 top-10 finishes.

Busch's playoffs were inconsistent. He had a rough start with a 19th-place finish in Las Vegas after wrecking a lapped car. Richmond was a strong rebound, finishing 2nd after battling for the win, but he was passed by Martin Truex Jr. At the Charlotte ROVAL, suspension issues led to a 37th-place finish. However, he showed more confidence in the Round of 12, consistently finishing in the top 6 at Dover. Talladega saw him involved in the Big One after being side-drafted by Stenhouse, but he still finished in the top 20. Despite setbacks, Busch made it to the Round of 8, aided by bonus points, including a 3rd-place finish at Kansas. At Martinsville, damage from a run-in with Aric Almirola dropped him to 14th, but after strong finishes at Texas and ISM Raceway, he made the Championship 4. Heading into Homestead as an underdog, Busch dominated the race, claiming his second championship with a win—his fifth of the season—snapping a 21-race winless streak. He finished the season with 5 wins, 17 top 5s, 27 top 10s, 1 pole, 1,582 laps led, and an 8.9 average finish, securing his first Regular Season Championship and Playoff title.

=== 2020: Championship Hangover ===
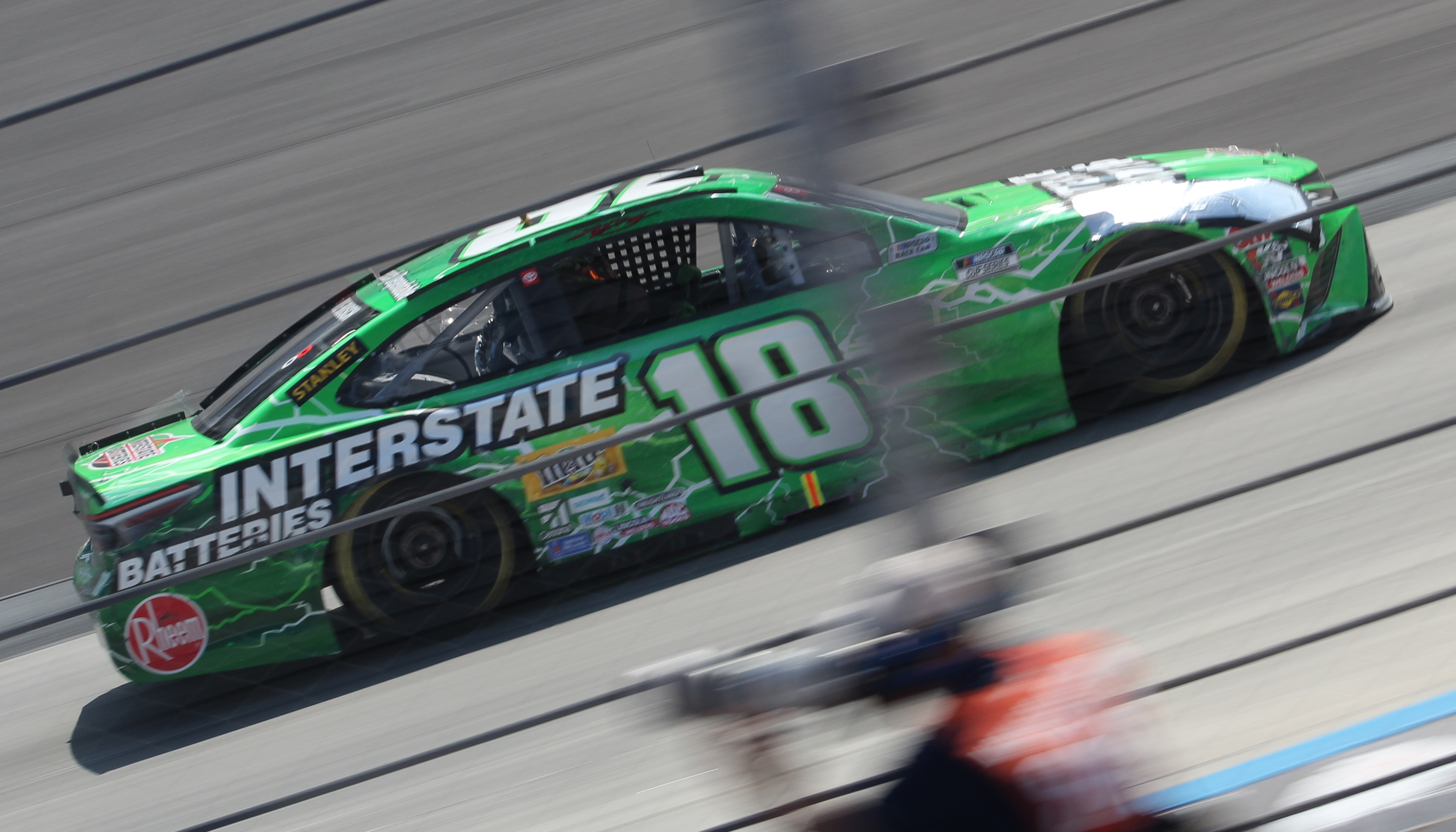
Busch racing at Dover International Speedway in 2020

Busch began the 2020 season with a 34th-place finish at the Daytona 500, where he blew an engine. He was the only driver to drop out during the red flag following the Lap 185 Big One who wasn't involved in the actual wreck. On February 22, 2020, after Busch won the Las Vegas Truck Series race, Kevin Harvick and Camping World CEO Marcus Lemonis offered a US$100,000 reward to any full-time Cup Series driver who could beat Busch in the Truck Series. Drivers like Corey LaJoie, Austin Dillon, Landon Cassill, and Timmy Hill showed interest in the challenge. Ultimately, Chase Elliott won the race and claimed the bounty.

Busch qualified for the playoffs on points but was eliminated after the Round of 12. A major topic of discussion throughout the 2020 season was his failure to win for an extended period. By the time the playoff race at Texas Motor Speedway came, Busch had already been eliminated from championship contention. Amid concerns that his 15-season win streak might end, Busch led 90 laps and managed to stretch his fuel to secure his first, and only, win of the 2020 season, ending a 33-race winless streak dating back to his championship-winning race at Homestead–Miami in 2019. He finished 8th in the final points standings.

=== 2021: 100 Career Xfinity wins ===
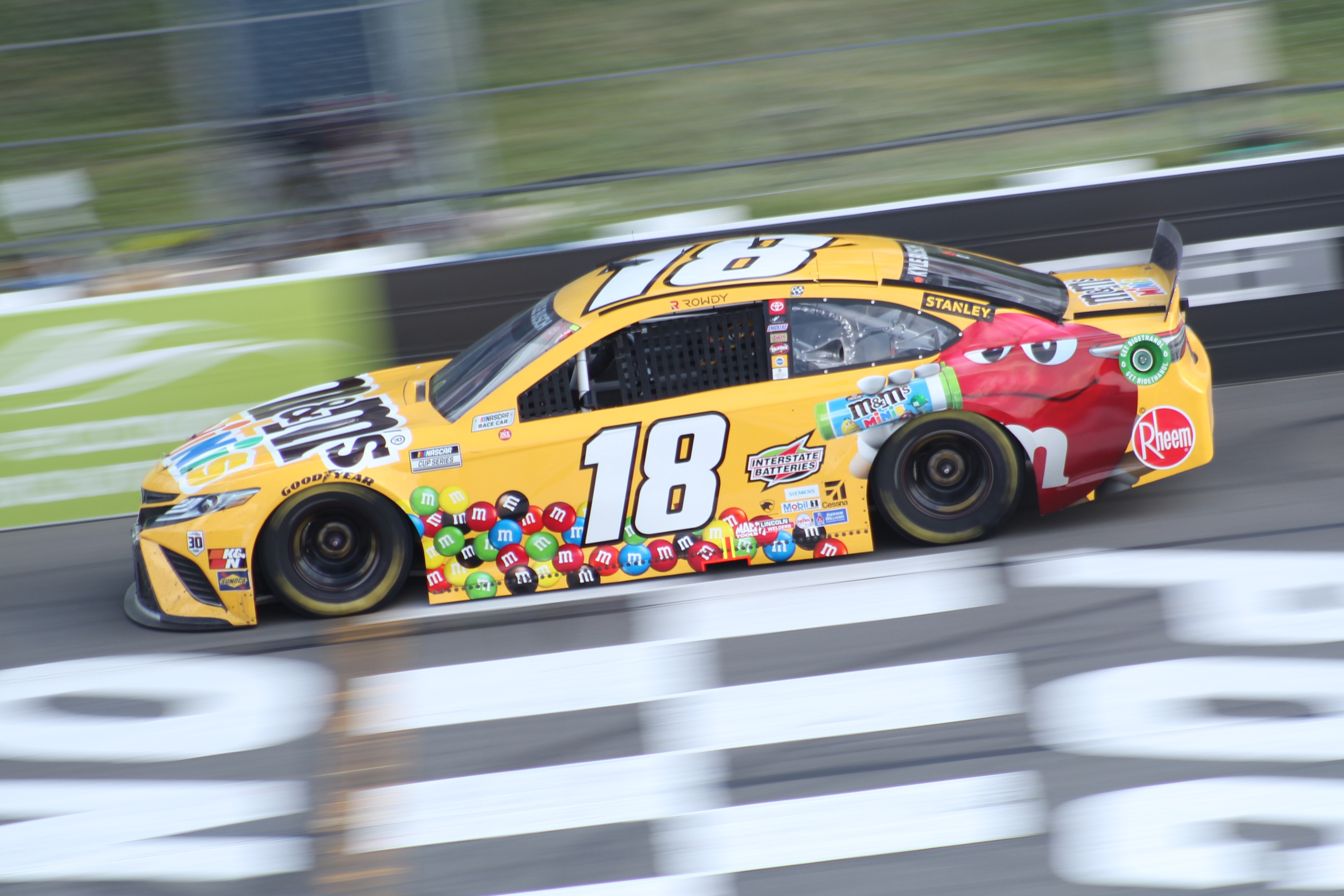
Busch's race-winning car at Pocono Raceway in 2021

Busch began the season with a win at the Busch Clash after Chase Elliott and Ryan Blaney tangled on the final lap. He finished 14th at the Daytona 500 after a fiery crash on the last lap, where he was hit by Austin Cindric but emerged uninjured. On his 36th birthday, Busch won at Kansas, marking his second birthday victory and extending his streak to 17 consecutive seasons with at least one win, tying David Pearson. He scored a second win at the Pocono doubleheader race 2, despite racing in 4th gear due to a broken transmission. At New Hampshire, Busch was leading when rain caused a crash with teammates Denny Hamlin and Martin Truex Jr., finishing last in 37th.

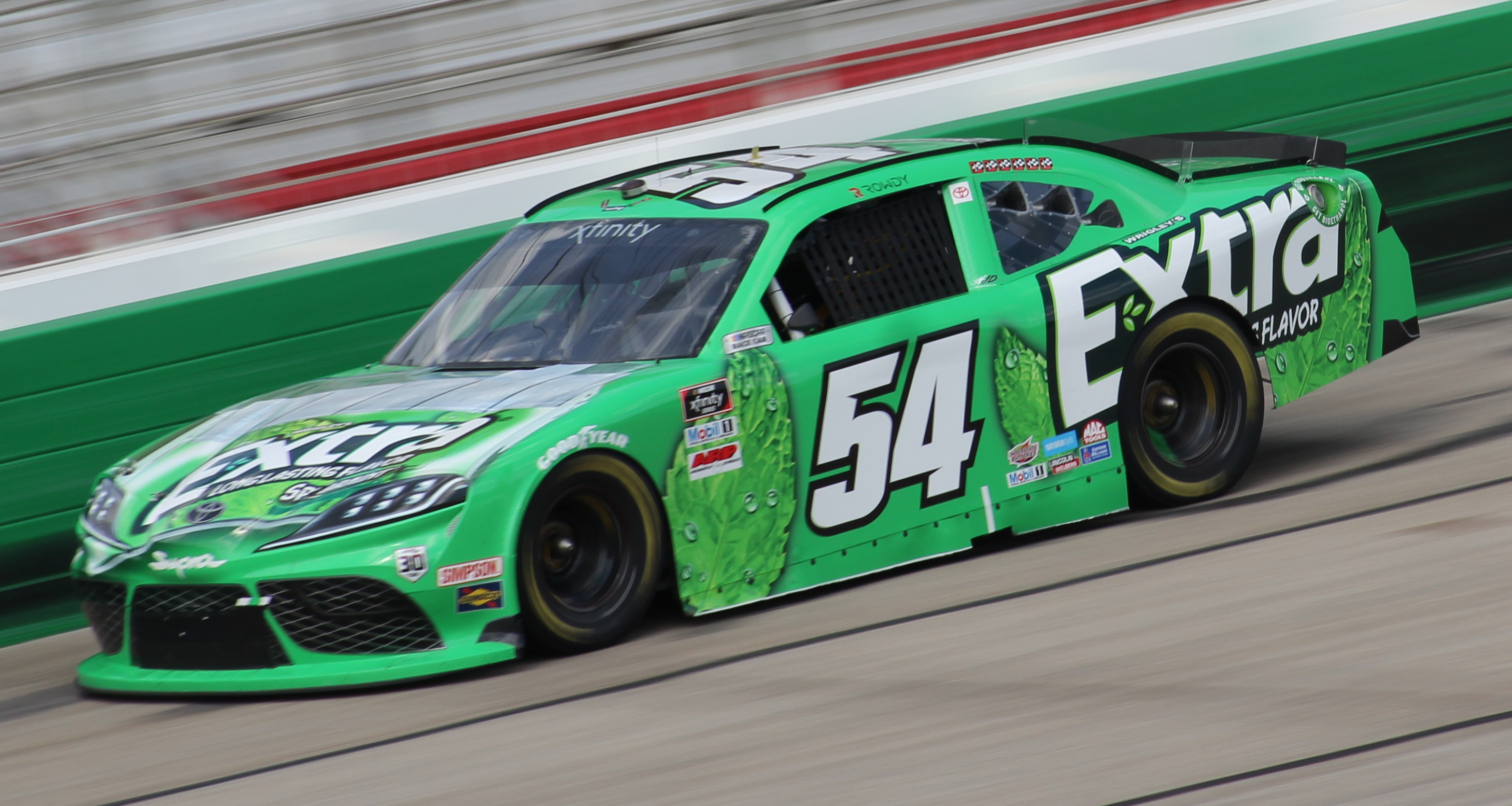
Busch before winning his 102nd Xfinity Series race at Atlanta Motor Speedway in 2021

Busch's two wins secured him a spot in the playoffs. However, after crashing at Darlington, a frustrated Busch drove over several safety cones and came dangerously close to hitting people while heading to the garage, resulting in a US$50,000 fine. In a late-race incident with longtime rival Brad Keselowski at Martinsville, which cost him a chance at the championship four, Busch used the word "retarded" to describe the situation. This led NASCAR to require him to undergo mandatory sensitivity training before the start of the next season. He finished the season in 9th place in the points standings.

In his Xfinity Series run, Busch won all five races he entered, including his 100th career victory at Nashville.

On December 20, 2021, Mars Inc. announced it would leave NASCAR after the 2022 season, leaving Busch and the No. 18 team without a primary sponsor for 2023.

=== 2022: Final Year with Joe Gibbs Racing ===
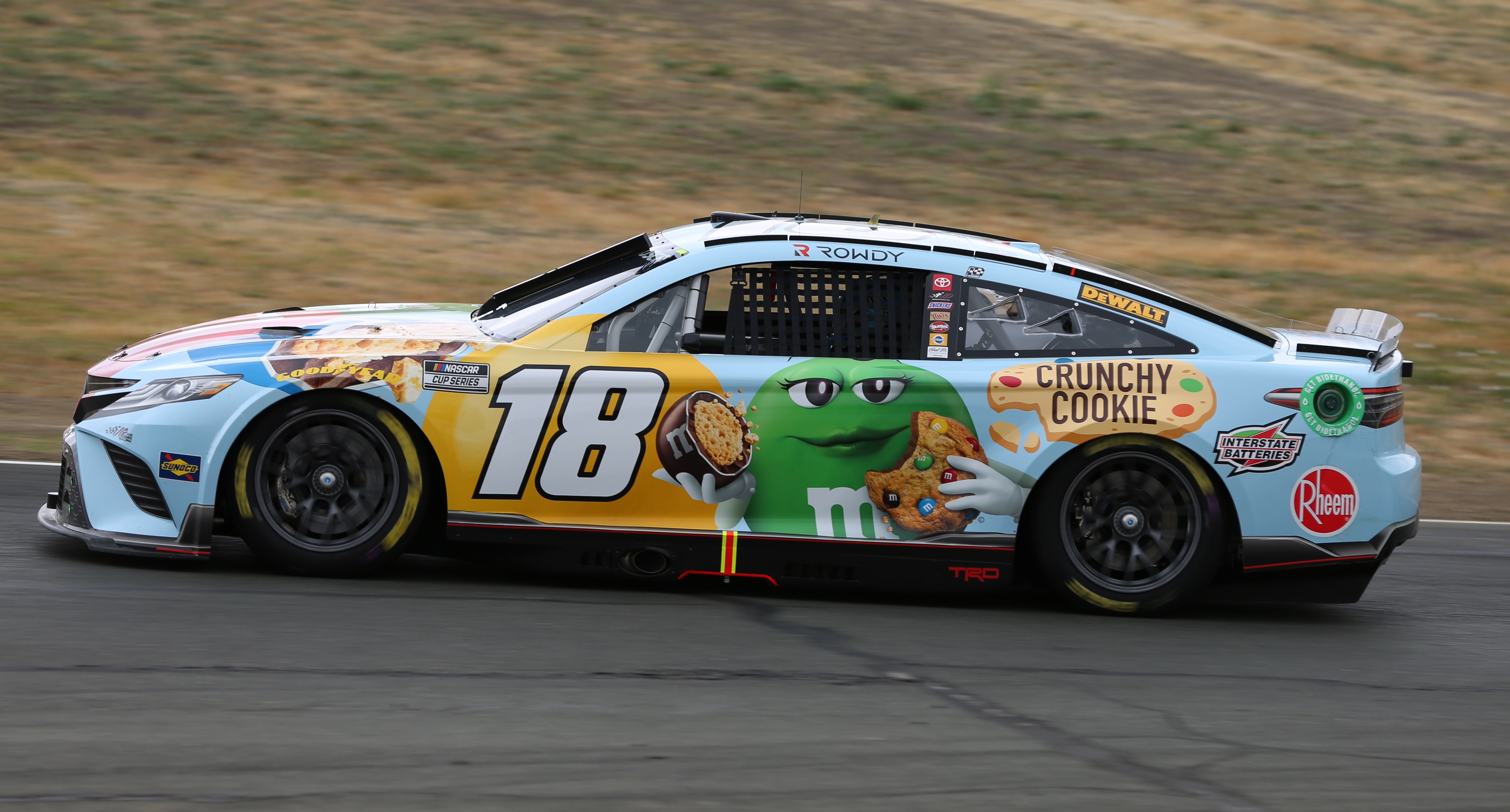
Busch’s No. 18 car at Sonoma Raceway in 2022

Busch started the 2022 season with a second-place finish at the Busch Light Clash, leading 65 laps before losing to Joey Logano. He finished sixth at the Daytona 500. Busch won the Bristol dirt race after Tyler Reddick and Chase Briscoe collided on the final lap. At Darlington, his race ended when Brad Keselowski blew a tire and collided with him, damaging his car's front suspension. Busch led the Texas All-Star race until a tire failure caused him to slow, resulting in a crash with Ross Chastain and Chase Elliott, though no one was injured. By race 15 of the season, Busch was sitting 2nd in the regular season standings, leading drivers with the most top-10s finishes and being considered a championship favorite. However, after a 2nd-place finish at Gateway in which he led 66 of the 245 laps, Busch went without a top-10 finish for eight straight races and 16 races without a top-5 finish. He finished second at Pocono, but was disqualified after a post-race inspection revealed a minor irregularity in the car’s front fascia. Busch led a race-high 155 laps at the Southern 500, but suffered an engine failure during a caution, relegating him to a 30th place finish. Another engine failure at the Bristol Night Race eliminated him from the playoffs. Busch finished the season off with strong outings, starting with a 3rd place finish at the Charlotte Roval. The next race at Las Vegas, Busch charged his way to a 3rd place finish after an early race spin and trouble on pit road. Busch ended his JGR tenure with a 7th place finish at the season finale in Phoenix, driving a special mosaic version of his primary M&Ms scheme to commemorate his and Mars Inc's tenure in NASCAR. Busch finished the year 13th in the standings, his first time outside the top 10 since 2012. He also finished the year with eight top-5 finishes, the least amount he's recorded in a single season up to that point.

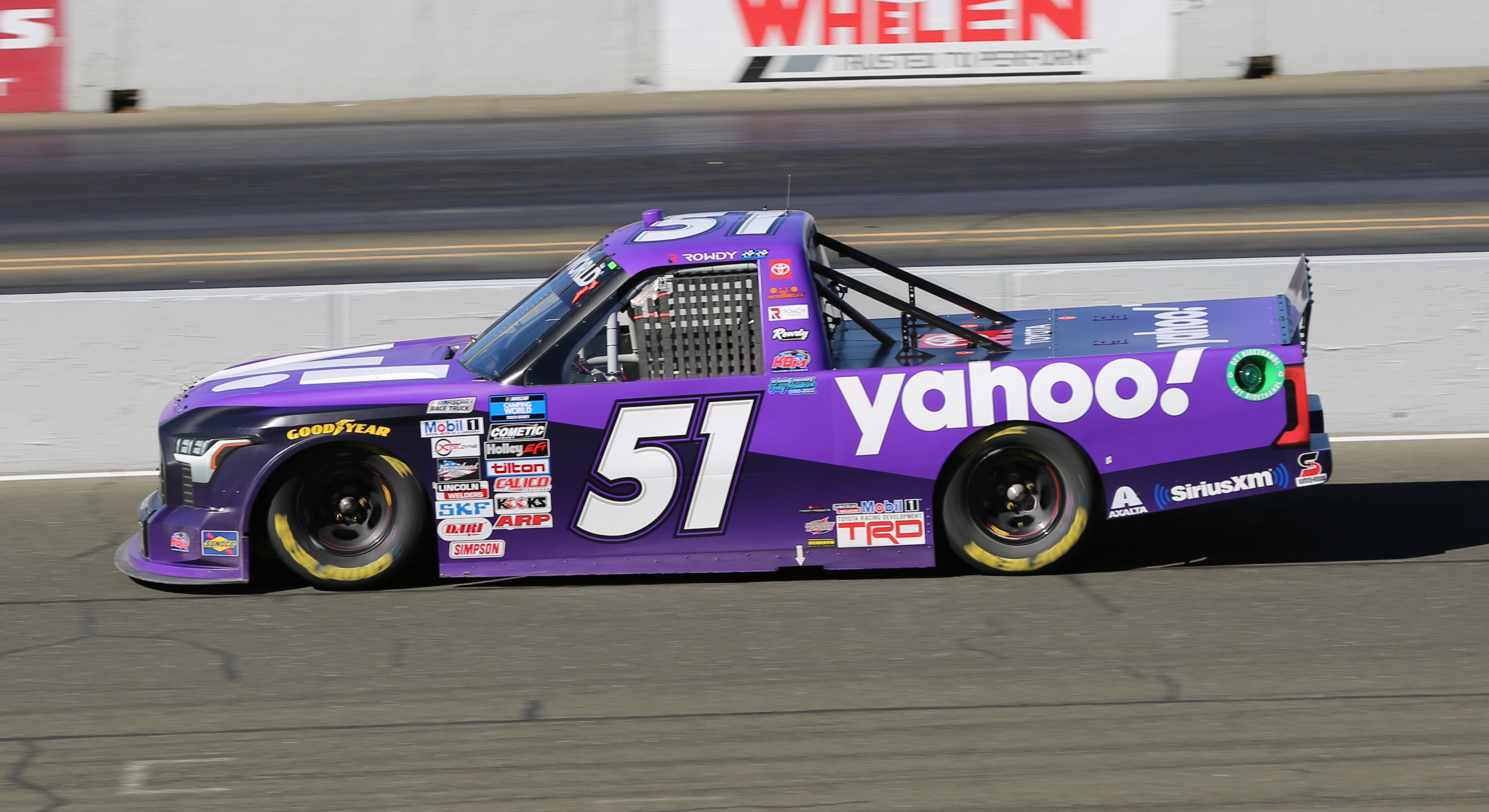
Busch's race-winning truck at Sonoma Raceway in 2022

In his part-time Truck Series campaign, Busch recorded three top-three finishes and secured a victory at Sonoma Raceway.

After Mars Inc. announced their departure from the sport following the 2022 season, JGR stated that they were confident in finding a sponsor to replace Mars. In mid-2022, it was reported that JGR was close to signing the Oracle Corporation as a full season sponsor for Busch, however the deal fell through at the last minute. After JGR and Toyota were unable to find a replacement for Mars Inc., it was reported that Busch would leave the team and manufacturer after 15 seasons. On September 13, 2022, Busch announced that he had signed with Richard Childress Racing to drive the No. 8 car in 2023. This move marked his return to Chevrolet for the first time since 2007, and he also brought Kyle Busch Motorsports with him.

== Richard Childress Racing (2023–2026) ==
=== 2023: First Year with Richard Childress Racing and final NASCAR Cup Series win ===
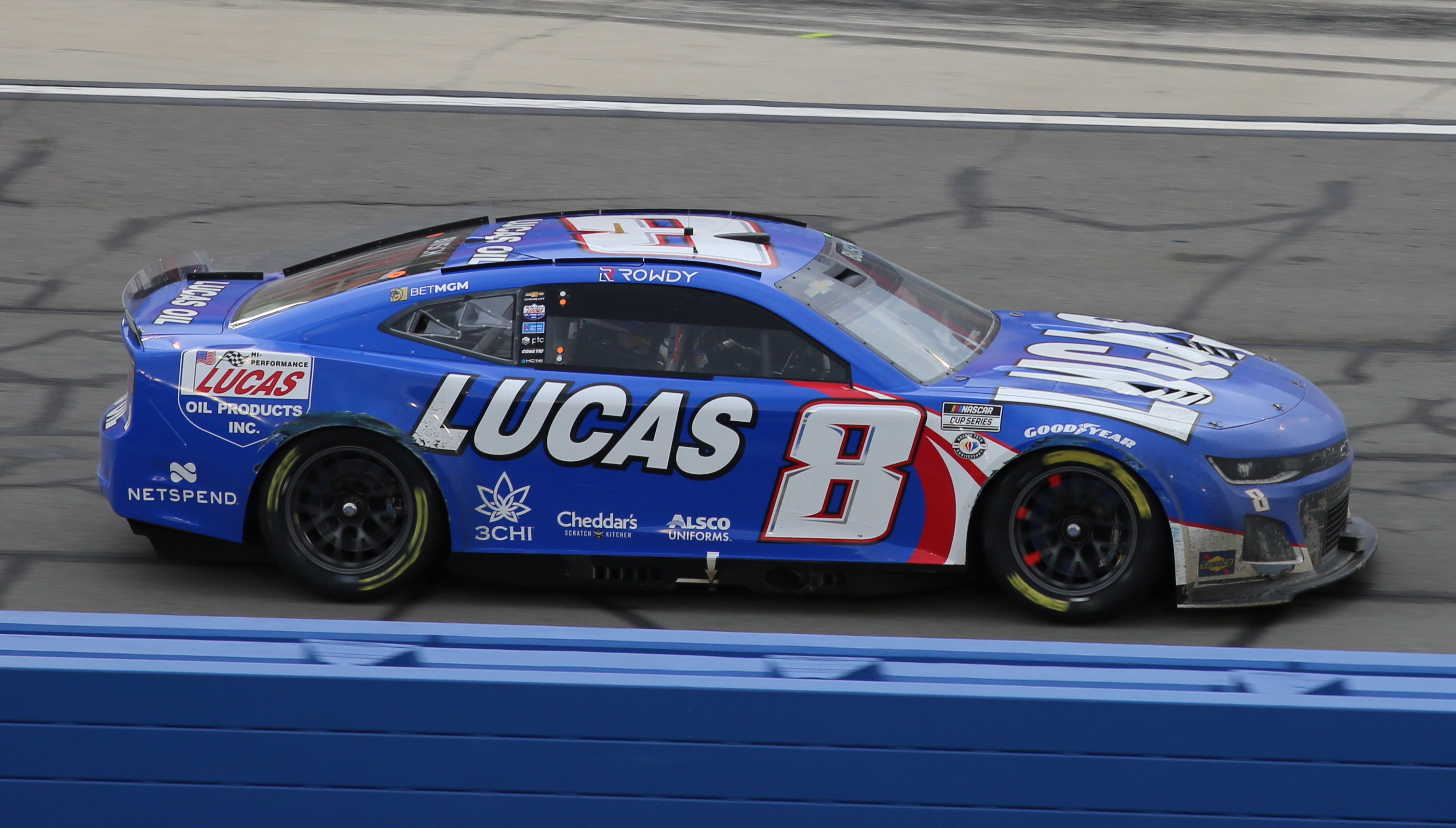
Busch's race-winning car at Auto Club Speedway in 2023

Busch started the 2023 season with a 19th-place finish at the Daytona 500. The following week, he secured his first win with RCR at Fontana. He went on to claim additional victories at Talladega and Gateway. His win at Gateway marked his 25th different Cup Series track victory, placing him ninth on the all-time list. It also marked his 11th season with at least three wins, his first such season since 2019. This was his final career NASCAR Cup Series victory. Busch was eliminated from the playoffs after the Round of 12, following the Charlotte Roval race.

In the Truck Series, Busch scored Kyle Busch Motorsports' 100th win at Pocono. Later in the season, the team announced its acquisition by Spire Motorsports.

=== 2024: Missing the playoffs, winless season ===
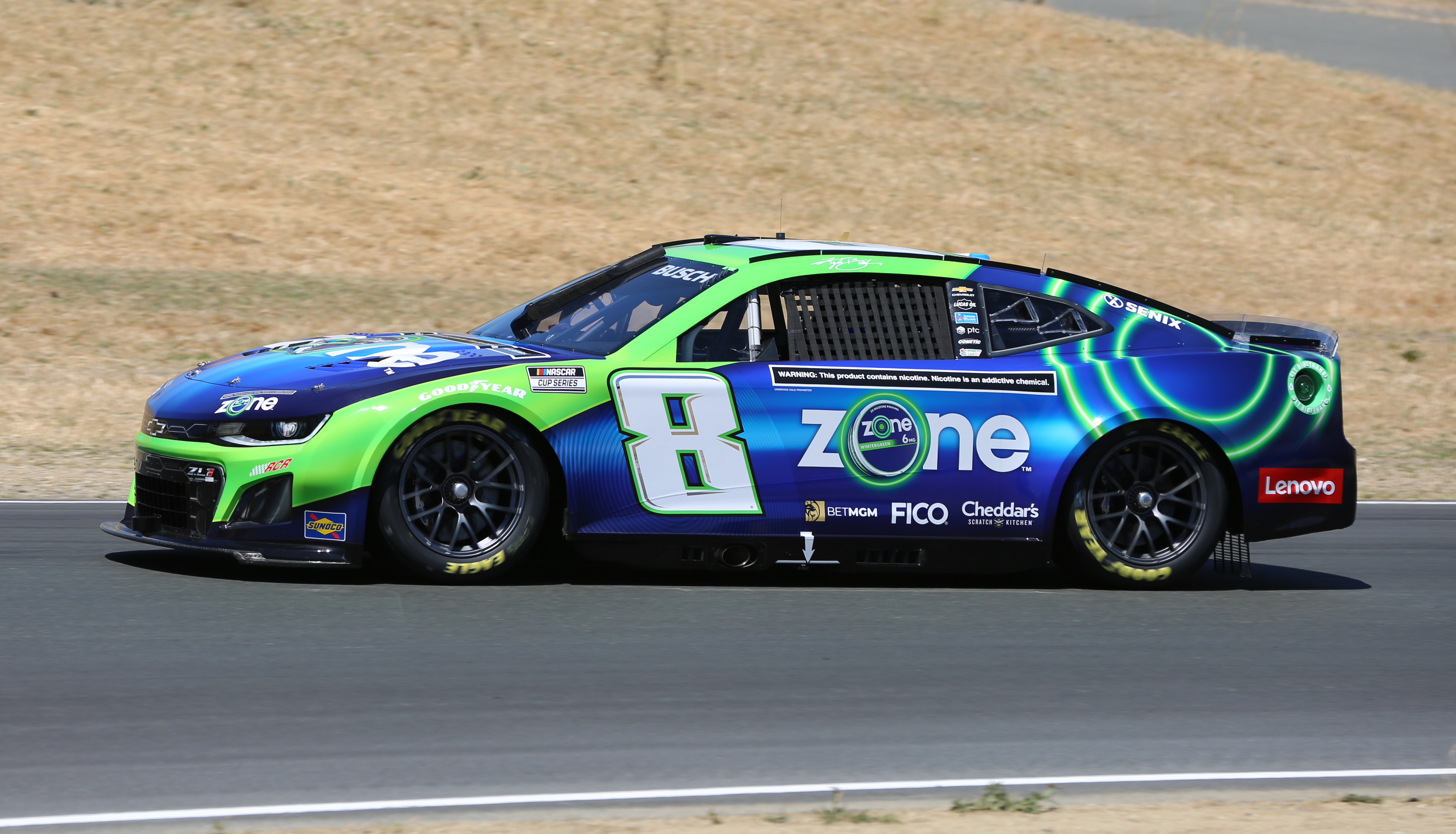
Busch's No. 8 car at Sonoma Raceway in 2024

Busch began the 2024 season with a 12th-place finish at the Daytona 500. The following week, he finished third in a thrilling three-wide photo finish at Atlanta, just 0.007 seconds behind Daniel Suárez, who claimed the win, with Ryan Blaney taking second.

On lap 2 of the All-Star Race, Busch made contact with the wall while battling Ricky Stenhouse Jr.. He then collided with Stenhouse's car from behind, sending him into the wall and ending his race. Afterward, Stenhouse expressed his intention to confront Busch. He approached Busch at his hauler in the infield, and the two drivers exchanged words about the incident. The argument escalated when Stenhouse threw a punch, triggering a brawl involving both drivers' crews and Stenhouse's father.

On June 3, Busch crashed during a Goodyear tire test at Indianapolis Motor Speedway. In the 2024 season, he won at Atlanta in his first Truck Series race after selling his team to Spire Motorsports. On April 12, he secured a win at Texas. However, despite finishing second in the final two regular-season races at Daytona and Darlington, Busch failed to make the playoffs. This marked the first time since 2012, and the first time in the history of the modern playoff format, that Busch missed the playoffs. Additionally, he went winless for the first time in his full-time career, ending a 19-year streak of at least one win per season. Busch finished 20th in the final point standings, his worst result since his rookie season in 2005, when he also finished 20th in points.

=== 2025: Another winless season ===
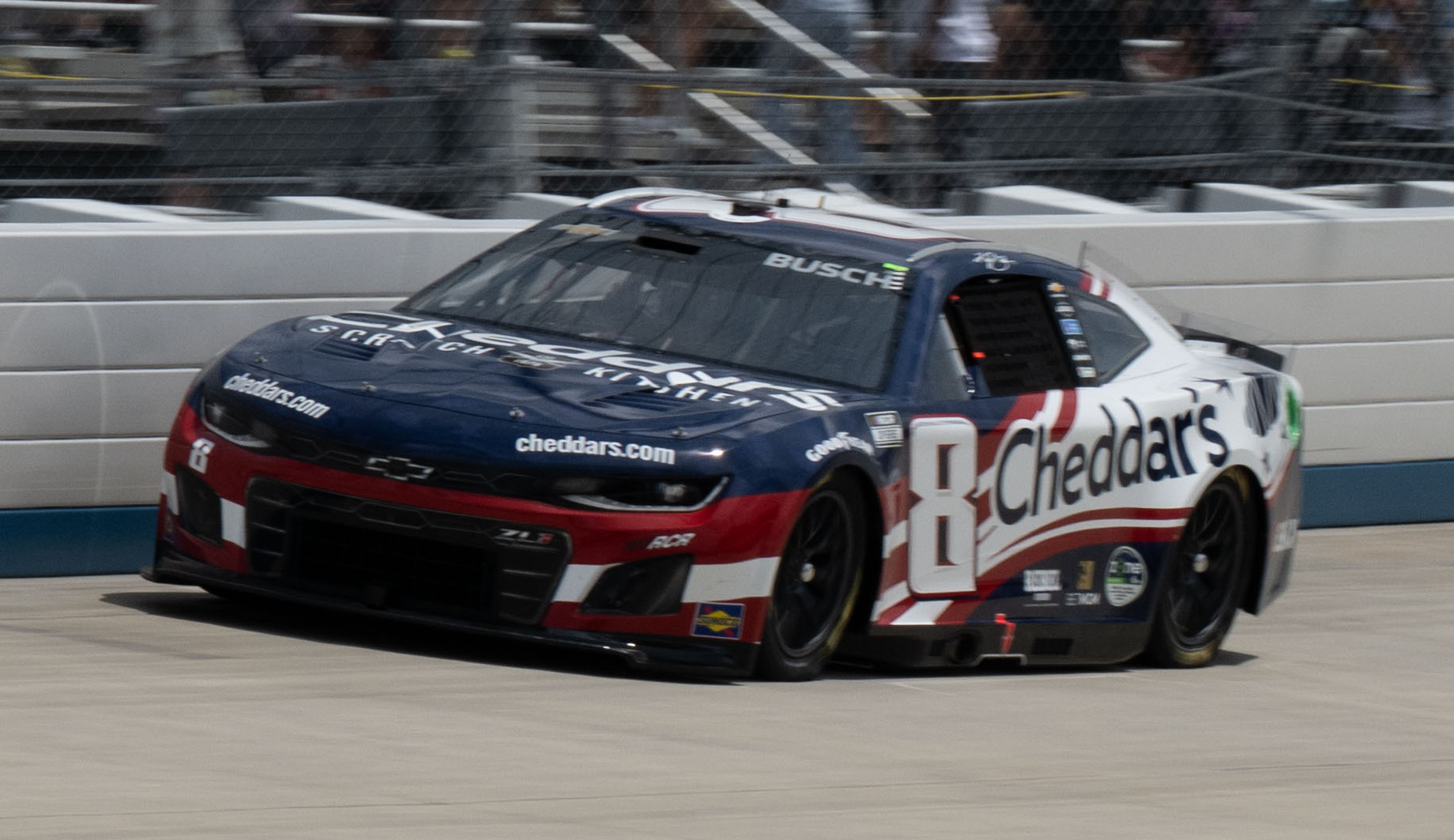
Busch’s No. 8 car at Dover Motor Speedway in 2025

Busch started off the 2025 season with a 34th-place finish at the Daytona 500 after being caught up in a late race wreck. However, he followed this race up with a 7th at Atlanta and a dominant performance at Circuit of the Americas, leading the most laps on the day (42), and finishing 5th after falling back in the final few laps. However, Busch struggled for most of the season, collecting only two top fives and seven top tens, ultimately failing to make the playoffs for the second season in a row. He ended the season 21st in the standings, which marks the first time in his full-time Cup Series career that he finished outside the top 20 in the standings.

In the Truck Series, Busch drove the Spire Motorsports No. 7 truck to victory lane at Atlanta.

=== 2026: Daytona 500 pole winner, final win, and death ===
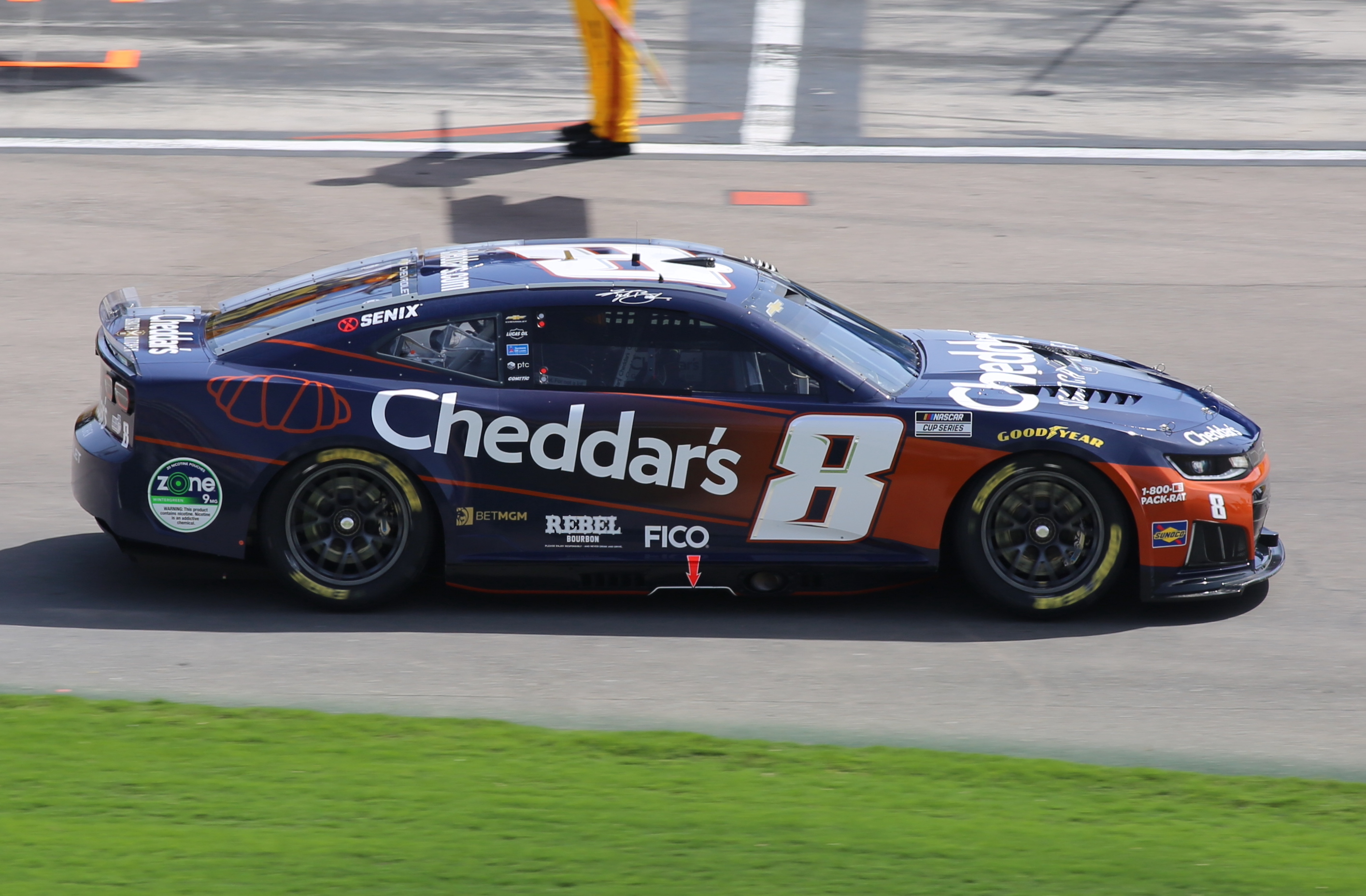
Busch’s No. 8 car at Las Vegas Motor Speedway in 2026

Busch scored the pole position at the Daytona 500. He would start the 2026 season with a 15th-place finish at Daytona and 14th in the points standings. The 2026 Go Bowling at The Glen marked Busch's final points paying Cup race, where he finished his season best in eighth and improved to 24th in the standings. During the race, he would ask for a doctor to meet him in his hauler post-race due to a sinus issue that he was suffering from. The 2026 Ecosave 200 on May 15 was his final NASCAR win overall. After the win he was asked on the broadcast by FOX Sports reporter Amanda Busick: "Why do these moments never get old, Kyle?" Busch's response was: "Because you never know when the last one is." His final NASCAR Cup event would be the exhibition 2026 NASCAR All-Star Race where he would finish in 17th.

He was listed in the entry list for the 2026 Coca-Cola 600, though on May 21, he was hospitalized with a severe illness and then died that same day at 41 years old. On May 23, the illness was revealed to be pneumonia that progressed to sepsis. Busch was posthumously awarded NASCAR's Most Popular Driver Award at the end of the season, with his widow Samantha accepting on his behalf.
