= List of the closest NASCAR O'Reilly Auto Parts Series finishes =

Like the NASCAR Cup Series, NASCAR's second national division O'Reilly Series has had many close finishes since electronic scoring was implemented in 1993. The current record for closest finish was set on February 17, 2018 during the 2018 PowerShares QQQ 300 at Daytona International Speedway, when Tyler Reddick defeated Elliott Sadler at a recorded margin of 0.0004 seconds, which is the closest finish recorded in any of the top 3 NASCAR series history.

== Closest finishes ==
NOTE: All finishes are after 1993, when NASCAR implemented electronic timing.

NASCAR Xfinity Series closest finishes
| Rank | Race | Margin (seconds) | Winner | 2nd Place | Track | Date |
|---|---|---|---|---|---|---|
| 1 | 2018 PowerShares QQQ 300 | 0.0004 | Tyler Reddick | Elliott Sadler | Daytona International Speedway | February 17, 2018 |
| 2 | 1996 Sears Auto Center 250 | 0.002 | Buckshot Jones | Mike McLaughlin | Milwaukee Mile | July 7, 1996 |
| 2 | 1999 Touchstone Energy 300 | 0.002 | Terry Labonte | Joe Nemechek | Talladega Superspeedway | April 24, 1999 |
| 2 | 2024 Andy's Frozen Custard 300 | 0.002 | Sam Mayer | Ryan Sieg | Texas Motor Speedway | April 13, 2024 |
| 5 | 2018 Coca-Cola Firecracker 250 | 0.005 | Kyle Larson | Elliott Sadler | Daytona International Speedway | July 6, 2018 |
| 5 | 2023 Wawa 250 | 0.005 | Justin Allgaier | Sheldon Creed | Daytona International Speedway | August 25, 2023 |
| 7 | 2011 DRIVE4COPD 300 | 0.007 | Tony Stewart | Clint Bowyer | Daytona International Speedway | February 19, 2011 |
| 8 | 1998 Jiffy Lube Miami 300 | 0.010 | Jeff Burton | Jimmy Spencer | Homestead–Miami Speedway | November 15, 1998 |
| 9 | 2010 NAPA Auto Parts 200 | 0.012 | Boris Said | Max Papis | Circuit Gilles Villeneuve | August 29, 2010 |
| 9 | 2017 Irish Hills 250 | 0.012 | Denny Hamlin | William Byron | Michigan International Speedway | June 17, 2017 |
| 11 | 2014 DRIVE4COPD 300 | 0.013 | Regan Smith | Brad Keselowski | Daytona International Speedway | February 22, 2014 |
| 12 | 2022 Sparks 300 | 0.015 | A. J. Allmendinger | Sam Mayer | Talladega Superspeedway | October 1, 2022 |
| 13 | 2011 Food City 250 | 0.019 | Kyle Busch | Joey Logano | Bristol Motor Speedway | August 26, 2011 |
| 14 | 2014 Subway Firecracker 250 | 0.020 | Kasey Kahne | Regan Smith | Daytona International Speedway | July 4, 2014 |
| 15 | 2013 Jeff Foxworthy's Grit Chips 300 | 0.023 | Kyle Busch | Kyle Larson | Bristol Motor Speedway | March 16, 2013 |
| 15 | 2021 Wawa 250 | 0.023 | Justin Haley | A. J. Allmendinger | Daytona International Speedway | August 28, 2021 |
| 17 | 2005 United Way 300 | 0.030 | Kasey Kahne | Greg Biffle | Kansas Speedway | October 8, 2005 |
| 17 | 2009 Aaron's 312 | 0.030 | David Ragan | Ryan Newman | Talladega Superspeedway | April 25, 2009 |
| 17 | 2021 NASCAR Xfinity Series Championship Race | 0.030 | Daniel Hemric | Austin Cindric | Phoenix Raceway | November 6, 2021 |
| 20 | 2023 Dead On Tools 250 | 0.032 | Justin Allgaier | Sheldon Creed | Martinsville Speedway | October 28, 2023 |
| 21 | 2012 Aaron's 312 | 0.034 | Joey Logano | Kyle Busch | Talladega Superspeedway | May 5, 2012 |
| 22 | 2002 Kroger 300 | 0.036 | Todd Bodine | Greg Biffle | Kentucky Speedway | June 16, 2002 |
| 23 | 2011 Subway Jalapeño 250 | 0.040 | Joey Logano | Jason Leffler | Daytona International Speedway | July 1, 2011 |
| 24 | 2004 Mr. Goodcents 300 | 0.041 | Joe Nemechek | Greg Biffle | Kansas Speedway | October 9, 2004 |
| 25 | 2016 Powershares QQQ 300 | 0.043 | Chase Elliott | Joey Logano | Daytona International Speedway | February 20, 2016 |
| 26 | 2025 GOVX 200 | 0.045 | Aric Almirola | Alex Bowman | Phoenix Raceway | March 8, 2025 |
| 27 | 1997 Winston Motorsports 300 | 0.048 | Randy LaJoie | Dale Shaw | South Boston Speedway | June 13, 1997 |
| 28 | 2010 Stater Brothers 300 | 0.051 | Kyle Busch | Greg Biffle | Auto Club Speedway | February 20, 2010 |
| 29 | 2007 Aaron's 312 | 0.052 | Bobby Labonte | Tony Stewart | Talladega Superspeedway | April 28, 2007 |
| 30 | 2012 Subway Jalapeño 250 | 0.054 | Kurt Busch | Ricky Stenhouse Jr. | Daytona International Speedway | July 6, 2012 |
| 30 | 2017 U.S. Cellular 250 | 0.054 | Ryan Preece | Kyle Benjamin | Iowa Speedway | July 29, 2017 |
| 32 | 2001 Carquest Auto Parts 300 | 0.055 | Jeff Green | Matt Kenseth | Charlotte Motor Speedway | May 26, 2001 |
| 33 | 1995 Humminbird Fishfinder 500K | 0.060 | Chad Little | Jimmy Spencer | Talladega Superspeedway | July 22, 1995 |
| 34 | 2012 Virginia 529 College Savings 250 | 0.062 | Kurt Busch | Denny Hamlin | Richmond Raceway | April 27, 2012 |
| 35 | 2021 Dead On Tools 250 | 0.064 | Noah Gragson | Austin Cindric | Martinsville Speedway | October 30, 2021 |
| 36 | 1998 Diamond Hill Plywood 200 | 0.066 | Bobby Labonte | Jeff Burton | Darlington Raceway | March 21, 1998 |
| 36 | 2011 U.S. Cellular 250 | 0.066 | Ricky Stenhouse Jr. | Carl Edwards | Iowa Speedway | August 6, 2011 |
| 38 | 2009 Camping World 300 | 0.068 | Tony Stewart | Carl Edwards | Daytona International Speedway | February 14, 2009 |
| 39 | 2020 Contender Boats 250 | 0.072 | Chase Briscoe | Brandon Jones | Homestead–Miami Speedway | June 14, 2020 |
| 40 | 1994 Fram Filter 500k | 0.080 | Ken Schrader | Terry Labonte | Talladega Superspeedway | July 23, 1994 |
| 41 | 2026 United Rentals 300300]] | 0.081 | Austin Hill | Justin Allgaier | Daytona International Speedway | February 14, 2026 |
| 42 | 2021 Food City 300 | 0.082 | A. J. Allmendinger | Austin Cindric | Bristol Motor Speedway | September 17, 2021 |
| 43 | 2026 TPG 250 | 0.084 | Sammy Smith | Carson Kvapil | Talladega Superspeedway | October 24, 2026 |
| 44 | 2007 Yellow Transportation 300 | 0.085 | Kyle Busch | Matt Kenseth | Kansas Speedway | September 29, 2007 |
| 44 | 2023 RAPTOR King of Tough 250 | 0.085 | Austin Hill | Daniel Hemric | Atlanta Motor Speedway | March 18, 2023 |
| 46 | 2006 Aaron's 312 | 0.086 | Martin Truex Jr. | Kevin Harvick | Talladega Superspeedway | April 29, 2006 |
| 46 | 2020 Toyota 200 | 0.086 | Chase Briscoe | Kyle Busch | Darlington Raceway | May 21, 2020 |
| 48 | 2015 Alert Today Florida 300 | 0.089 | Ryan Reed | Chris Buescher | Daytona International Speedway | February 21, 2015 |
| 49 | 2009 Kroger On Track for the Cure 250 | 0.090 | Brad Keselowski | Kyle Busch | Memphis Motorsports Park | October 24, 2009 |
| 50 | 1998 GM Goodwrench Service Plus 200 | 0.092 | Matt Kenseth | Tony Stewart | Rockingham Speedway | February 21, 1998 |
| 50 | 2018 Lilly Diabetes 250 | 0.092 | Justin Allgaier | Tyler Reddick | Indianapolis Motor Speedway | September 10, 2018 |
| 52 | 2010 Subway Jalapeño 250 | 0.094 | Dale Earnhardt Jr. | Joey Logano | Daytona International Speedway | July 2, 2010 |
| 53 | 2008 Hefty Odor Block 200 | 0.096 | Carl Edwards | Denny Hamlin | Phoenix Raceway | November 8, 2008 |
| 54 | 1996 BellSouth/Opryland USA 320 | 0.100 | Bobby Labonte | David Green | Nashville Fairgrounds Speedway | March 17, 1996 |
| 54 | 1997 Birmingham Auto Dealers Easycare 500k | 0.100 | Mark Martin | Steve Park | Talladega Superspeedway | April 26, 1997 |
| 54 | 2004 Food City 250 | 0.100 | Dale Earnhardt Jr. | Matt Kenseth | Bristol Motor Speedway | August 27, 2004 |
| 57 | 2007 Sam's Town 300 | 0.101 | Jeff Burton | Kyle Busch | Las Vegas Motor Speedway | March 10, 2007 |
| 58 | 2007 Winn-Dixie 250 | 0.103 | Kyle Busch | Kevin Harvick | Daytona International Speedway | July 6, 2007 |
| 59 | 2021 Beef. It's What's for Dinner. 300 | 0.104 | Austin Cindric | Brett Moffitt | Daytona International Speedway | February 13, 2021 |
| 59 | 2025 Focused Health 250 | 0.104 | Nick Sanchez | Carson Kvapil | Atlanta Motor Speedway | June 27, 2025 |
| 61 | 2000 Hardee's 250 | 0.105 | Jeff Green | Matt Kenseth | Richmond Raceway | May 5, 2000 |
| 61 | 2025 United Rentals 250 | 0.105 | Austin Hill | Carson Kvapil | Talladega Superspeedway | October 18, 2025 |
| 63 | 1997 United States Cellular 200 | 0.106 | Mike McLaughlin | Steve Park | New Hampshire Motor Speedway | May 10, 1997 |
| 63 | 2024 RAPTOR King of Tough 250 | 0.106 | Austin Hill | Chandler Smith | Atlanta Motor Speedway | February 24, 2024 |
| 65 | 2017 Lilly Diabetes 250 | 0.108 | William Byron | Paul Menard | Indianapolis Motor Speedway | July 22, 2017 |
| 66 | 2019 Circle K Firecracker 250 | 0.109 | Ross Chastain | Justin Haley | Daytona International Speedway | July 5, 2019 |
| 67 | 2022 Alsco Uniforms 250 | 0.111 | Austin Hill | Josh Berry | Atlanta Motor Speedway | July 9, 2022 |
| 68 | 1996 Humminbird Fishfinder 500K | 0.112 | Greg Sacks | Joe Nemechek | Talladega Superspeedway | July 27, 1996 |
| 68 | 2010 TECH-NET Auto Service 300 | 0.112 | Kyle Busch | Brad Keselowski | Charlotte Motor Speedway | May 29, 2010 |
| 70 | 2023 Ag-Pro 300 | 0.113 | Jeb Burton | Sheldon Creed | Talladega Superspeedway | April 22, 2023 |
| 71 | 1998 Myrtle Beach 250 | 0.115 | Randy LaJoie | David Green | Myrtle Beach Speedway | July 11, 1998 |
| 72 | 2004 Winn-Dixie 250 | 0.116 | Mike Wallace | Greg Biffle | Daytona International Speedway | July 2, 2004 |
| 72 | 2019 NASCAR Racing Experience 300 | 0.116 | Michael Annett | Justin Allgaier | Daytona International Speedway | February 16, 2019 |
| 72 | 2022 ToyotaCare 250 | 0.116 | Ty Gibbs | John Hunter Nemechek | Richmond Raceway | April 2, 2022 |
| 75 | 2004 Sam's Town 300 | 0.119 | Kevin Harvick | Kasey Kahne | Las Vegas Motor Speedway | March 6, 2004 |
| 75 | 2004 Aaron's 312 | 0.119 | Matt Kenseth | Kyle Busch | Atlanta Motor Speedway | October 30, 2004 |
| 77 | 2014 Aaron's 312 | 0.124 | Elliott Sadler | Chris Buescher | Talladega Superspeedway | May 3, 2014 |
| 78 | 2001 Subway 300 | 0.125 | Mike McLaughlin | Jimmy Spencer | Talladega Superspeedway | April 21, 2001 |
| 78 | 2002 Carquest Auto Parts 300 | 0.125 | Jeff Green | Greg Biffle | Charlotte Motor Speedway | May 25, 2002 |
| 80 | 2017 Service King 300 | 0.127 | Kyle Larson | Joey Logano | Auto Club Speedway | March 25, 2017 |
| 80 | 2019 MoneyLion 300 | 0.127 | Tyler Reddick | Gray Gaulding | Talladega Superspeedway | April 27, 2019 |
| 82 | 2005 Aaron's 312 | 0.128 | Martin Truex Jr. | Jon Wood | Talladega Superspeedway | April 30, 2005 |
| 82 | 2007 O'Reilly 300 | 0.128 | Matt Kenseth | Denny Hamlin | Texas Motor Speedway | April 14, 2007 |
| 82 | 2026 Timberland PRO 200 | 0.128 | Jesse Love | Sam Mayer | Phoenix Raceway | October 17, 2026 |
| 85 | 2015 Winn-Dixie 300 | 0.130 | Joey Logano | Brian Scott | Talladega Superspeedway | May 2, 2015 |
| 86 | 2005 Winn-Dixie 250 | 0.131 | Martin Truex Jr. | Kevin Harvick | Daytona International Speedway | July 1, 2005 |
| 86 | 2022 Ag-Pro 300 | 0.131 | Noah Gragson | Jeffrey Earnhardt | Talladega Superspeedway | April 23, 2022 |
| 88 | 2014 Food City 300 | 0.132 | Ryan Blaney | Kyle Busch | Bristol Motor Speedway | August 22, 2014 |
| 88 | 2019 Indiana 250 | 0.132 | Kyle Busch | Justin Allgaier | Indianapolis Motor Speedway | September 7, 2019 |
| 90 | 2008 Winn-Dixie 250 | 0.133 | Denny Hamlin | Kyle Busch | Daytona International Speedway | July 4, 2008 |
| 91 | 2004 Hershey's Kisses 300 | 0.135 | Dale Earnhardt Jr. | Johnny Sauter | Daytona International Speedway | February 14, 2004 |
| 92 | 2005 Ford 300 | 0.137 | Ryan Newman | Greg Biffle | Homestead–Miami Speedway | November 19, 2005 |
| 93 | 1997 Food City 500 | 0.139 | Jimmy Spencer | Steve Park | Bristol Motor Speedway | August 22, 1997 |
| 93 | 2026 Focused Health 250 (Atlanta) | 0.139 | Justin Allgaier | Carson Kvapil | Atlanta Motor Speedway | July 11, 2026 |
| 95 | 2004 Goulds Pumps/ITT Industries 200 | 0.140 | Martin Truex Jr. | Bobby Hamilton Jr. | Nazareth Speedway | May 23, 2004 |
| 96 | 2014 DAV 200 | 0.141 | Brad Keselowski | Kyle Busch | Phoenix Raceway | November 8, 2014 |
| 96 | 2024 Ag-Pro 300 | 0.141 | Jesse Love | Riley Herbst | Talladega Superspeedway | April 20, 2024 |
| 98 | 2011 O'Reilly Auto Parts Challenge | 0.142 | Trevor Bayne | Denny Hamlin | Texas Motor Speedway | November 5, 2011 |
| 98 | 2017 Sparks Energy 300 | 0.142 | Aric Almirola | Elliott Sadler | Talladega Superspeedway | May 6, 2017 |
| 98 | 2023 Pacific Office Automation 147 | 0.142 | Cole Custer | Justin Allgaier | Portland International Raceway | June 3, 2023 |

== See also ==
- Photo finish
- List of the closest NASCAR Cup Series finishes
- List of the closest NASCAR Truck Series finishes
