= 2024 AdventHealth 400 =

NASCAR Cup Series race

Race details
- Race 12 of 36 in the 2024 NASCAR Cup Series
- Date: May 5, 2024
- Location: Kansas Speedway in Kansas City, Kansas, U.S.
- Course: Permanent racing facility
- Course length: 1.5 miles (2.4 km)
- Distance: 268 laps, 402 mi (646.956 km)
- Scheduled distance: 267 laps, 400.5 mi (644.542 km)
- Average speed: 126.481 miles per hour (203.551 km/h)

Pole position
Driver	Christopher Bell	Joe Gibbs Racing
- Time: 29.491

Most laps led
Driver	Denny Hamlin	Joe Gibbs Racing
- Laps: 71

Winner
No. 5	Kyle Larson	Hendrick Motorsports

Television in the United States
- Network: FS1
- Announcers: Mike Joy, Clint Bowyer, and Kevin Harvick

Radio in the United States
- Radio: MRN
- Booth announcers: Alex Hayden, Jeff Striegle, and Todd Gordon
- Turn announcers: Mike Bagley (1 & 2) and Kurt Becker (3 & 4)

The 2024 AdventHealth 400 was a NASCAR Cup Series race that was held on May 5, 2024, at Kansas Speedway in Kansas City, Kansas. Contested over 268 laps—extended from 267 laps due to an overtime finish, on the 1.5-mile (2.4 km) asphalt speedway, it was the 12th race of the 2024 NASCAR Cup Series season and played host to the closest finish in NASCAR Cup Series history at 0.001 seconds between the winner, Kyle Larson, and Chris Buescher, who finished 2nd.

== Report ==
=== Background ===
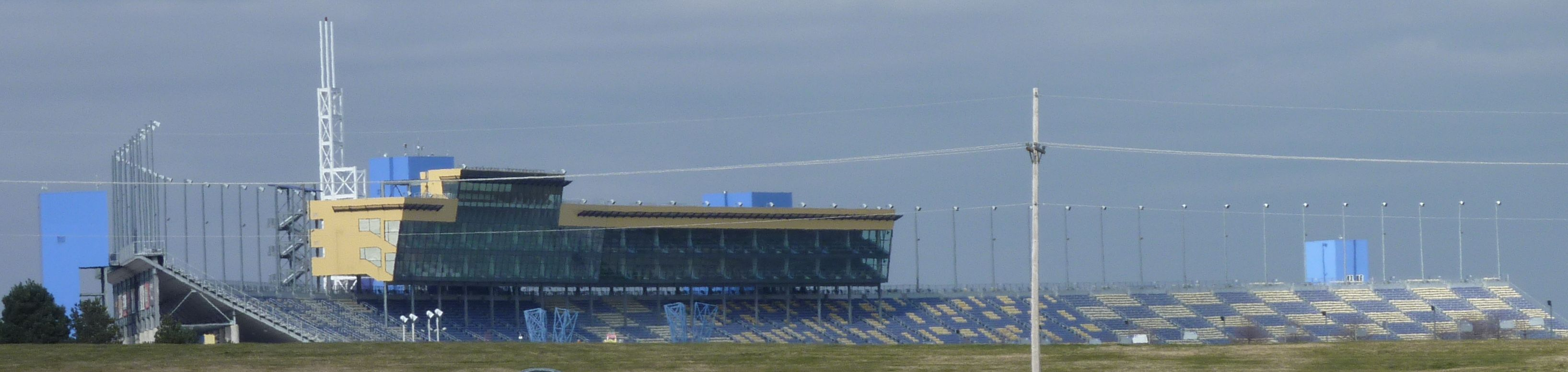
The layout of Kansas Speedway, the venue where the race was held.

Kansas Speedway is a 1.5-mile (2.4 km) tri-oval race track in Kansas City, Kansas. It was built in 2001 and hosts two annual NASCAR race weekends. The NTT IndyCar Series also raced there until 2011. The speedway is owned and operated by the International Speedway Corporation.

==== Entry list ====
- (R) denotes rookie driver.
- (i) denotes driver who is ineligible for series driver points.

No.	Driver	Team	Manufacturer
1	Ross Chastain	Trackhouse Racing	Chevrolet
2	Austin Cindric	Team Penske	Ford
3	Austin Dillon	Richard Childress Racing	Chevrolet
4	Josh Berry (R)	Stewart-Haas Racing	Ford
5	Kyle Larson	Hendrick Motorsports	Chevrolet
6	Brad Keselowski	RFK Racing	Ford
7	Corey LaJoie	Spire Motorsports	Chevrolet
8	Kyle Busch	Richard Childress Racing	Chevrolet
9	Chase Elliott	Hendrick Motorsports	Chevrolet
10	Noah Gragson	Stewart-Haas Racing	Ford
11	Denny Hamlin	Joe Gibbs Racing	Toyota
12	Ryan Blaney	Team Penske	Ford
14	Chase Briscoe	Stewart-Haas Racing	Ford
15	Riley Herbst (i)	Rick Ware Racing	Ford
16	Derek Kraus	Kaulig Racing	Chevrolet
17	Chris Buescher	RFK Racing	Ford
19	Martin Truex Jr.	Joe Gibbs Racing	Toyota
20	Christopher Bell	Joe Gibbs Racing	Toyota
21	Harrison Burton	Wood Brothers Racing	Ford
22	Joey Logano	Team Penske	Ford
23	Bubba Wallace	23XI Racing	Toyota
24	William Byron	Hendrick Motorsports	Chevrolet
31	Daniel Hemric	Kaulig Racing	Chevrolet
33	Austin Hill (i)	Richard Childress Racing	Chevrolet
34	Michael McDowell	Front Row Motorsports	Ford
38	Todd Gilliland	Front Row Motorsports	Ford
41	Ryan Preece	Stewart-Haas Racing	Ford
42	John Hunter Nemechek	Legacy Motor Club	Toyota
43	Corey Heim (i)	Legacy Motor Club	Toyota
45	Tyler Reddick	23XI Racing	Toyota
47	Ricky Stenhouse Jr.	JTG Daugherty Racing	Chevrolet
48	Alex Bowman	Hendrick Motorsports	Chevrolet
51	Justin Haley	Rick Ware Racing	Ford
54	Ty Gibbs	Joe Gibbs Racing	Toyota
71	Zane Smith (R)	Spire Motorsports	Chevrolet
77	Carson Hocevar (R)	Spire Motorsports	Chevrolet
84	Jimmie Johnson	Legacy Motor Club	Toyota
99	Daniel Suárez	Trackhouse Racing	Chevrolet
Official entry list

== Practice ==
Tyler Reddick was the fastest in the practice session with a time of 29.834 seconds and a speed of 181.002 mph (291.294 km/h).

=== Practice results ===
Pos	No.	Driver	Team	Manufacturer	Time	Speed
1	45	Tyler Reddick	23XI Racing	Toyota	29.834	181.002
2	24	William Byron	Hendrick Motorsports	Chevrolet	29.963	180.222
3	23	Bubba Wallace	23XI Racing	Toyota	30.044	179.736
Official practice results

== Qualifying ==
Christopher Bell scored the pole for the race with a time of 29.491 and a speed of 183.107 mph (294.682 km/h).

=== Qualifying results ===
Pos	No.	Driver	Team	Manufacturer	R1	R2
1	20	Christopher Bell	Joe Gibbs Racing	Toyota	29.667	29.491
2	1	Ross Chastain	Trackhouse Racing	Chevrolet	29.567	29.556
3	10	Noah Gragson	Stewart-Haas Racing	Ford	29.905	29.597
4	5	Kyle Larson	Hendrick Motorsports	Chevrolet	29.460	29.608
5	8	Kyle Busch	Richard Childress Racing	Chevrolet	29.644	29.659
6	54	Ty Gibbs	Joe Gibbs Racing	Toyota	29.508	29.712
7	2	Austin Cindric	Team Penske	Ford	29.860	29.782
8	34	Michael McDowell	Front Row Motorsports	Ford	29.944	29.841
9	9	Chase Elliott	Hendrick Motorsports	Chevrolet	29.653	29.998
10	14	Chase Briscoe	Stewart-Haas Racing	Ford	29.831	30.696
11	22	Joey Logano	Team Penske	Ford	29.677	—
12	17	Chris Buescher	RFK Racing	Ford	29.946	—
13	19	Martin Truex Jr.	Joe Gibbs Racing	Toyota	29.686	—
14	11	Denny Hamlin	Joe Gibbs Racing	Toyota	29.972	—
15	45	Tyler Reddick	23XI Racing	Toyota	29.695	—
16	3	Austin Dillon	Richard Childress Racing	Chevrolet	30.024	—
17	4	Josh Berry (R)	Stewart-Haas Racing	Ford	29.714	—
18	48	Alex Bowman	Hendrick Motorsports	Chevrolet	30.051	—
19	84	Jimmie Johnson	Legacy Motor Club	Toyota	29.810	—
20	43	Corey Heim (i)	Legacy Motor Club	Toyota	30.079	—
21	47	Ricky Stenhouse Jr.	JTG Daugherty Racing	Chevrolet	29.846	—
22	77	Carson Hocevar (R)	Spire Motorsports	Chevrolet	30.105	—
23	23	Bubba Wallace	23XI Racing	Toyota	29.888	—
24	71	Zane Smith (R)	Spire Motorsports	Chevrolet	30.226	—
25	38	Todd Gilliland	Front Row Motorsports	Ford	29.892	—
26	12	Ryan Blaney	Team Penske	Ford	30.265	—
27	99	Daniel Suárez	Trackhouse Racing	Chevrolet	29.913	—
28	7	Corey LaJoie	Spire Motorsports	Chevrolet	30.266	—
29	42	John Hunter Nemechek	Legacy Motor Club	Toyota	29.947	—
30	6	Brad Keselowski	RFK Racing	Ford	30.369	—
31	21	Harrison Burton	Wood Brothers Racing	Ford	29.964	—
32	41	Ryan Preece	Stewart-Haas Racing	Ford	30.376	—
33	31	Daniel Hemric	Kaulig Racing	Chevrolet	30.163	—
34	33	Austin Hill (i)	Richard Childress Racing	Chevrolet	30.392	—
35	51	Justin Haley	Rick Ware Racing	Ford	30.164	—
36	24	William Byron	Hendrick Motorsports	Chevrolet	31.043	—
37	15	Riley Herbst (i)	Rick Ware Racing	Ford	30.179	—
38	16	Derek Kraus	Kaulig Racing	Chevrolet	31.266	—
Official qualifying results

== Race ==
=== Stage 1 ===
The race was scheduled to start at 2 pm Central time but rain fell which caused a nearly 4 hour delay and the green flag fell at around 5:43 Central. Pole sitter Christopher Bell and outside pole sitter Ross Chastain battled for the lead and Bell beat Chastain to lead lap 1. Chastain led lap 2 before he got in front of Bell on lap 3 and held on to it. At around lap 31, green flag pit stops would begin. Chastain would come in on lap 33 giving the lead back to Christopher Bell. Bell would pit on lap 35 giving the lead to Derek Kraus. On lap 42, Ross Chastain took the lead from Kraus. On lap 44, Kyle Larson took the lead but Chastain immediately took it back. On lap 49, Larson took the lead again but Chastain immeadietly passed him and Chastain took the lead back. Larson got in front again on lap 50 but couldn't hold the lead and was immeadietly passed by Chastain. Larson led lap 51 before he got in front of Chastain and held on to it. On lap 63, Denny Hamlin went to take the lead and led that lap and the following lap but could not get in front of Larson and Larson took it back on lap 65. On lap 66, Hamlin went to take the lead and led that lap and the following two laps before he got in front of Larson on lap 69. Hamlin would hold off Ross Chastain and win stage 1.

=== Stage 2 ===
Ross Chastain won the race off of pit road and he led the field to the restart on lap 89. On the restart, Chastain and Christopher Bell fought hard for the lead but Kyle Larson made a 3 wide pass on the both of them and Larson took the lead. Behind Larson, Chastain, Bell, Martin Truex Jr., Chris Buescher, and Ty Gibbs went 5 wide for second place at the start-finish line in which they were all the keep their cars under control to not cause a wreck. At around lap 117, green flag pit stops began once again. Larson would pit on lap 119 giving the lead to Tyler Reddick. Reddick would pit on lap 125 and after everything cycled through, Chris Buescher was the new leader. Buescher was looking to give Ford their first win in all of NASCAR of the season as the manufacturer had none of their teams win in the Truck Series, Xfinity Series, and Cup Series at this point in the season. Buescher would hold on and win stage 2.

=== Final stage ===
Kyle Larson won the race off of pit road with Buescher in second. Unfortunetly for Buescher, he was penalized for his crew going over the wall too soon and had to start from the rear. To make matters worse, a piece of his windshield tear off landed on the rear part of his roof which could possibly affect his aerodynamics but Buescher elected not to pit. The race would restart on lap 174 and Buescher's tear off would get blown off the car once he picked up speed and out of the way. On lap 176, the first caution for incident and the third of the day would occur when Jimmie Johnson got bumped by Corey LaJoie in turn 1 which caused Johnson to spin to the apron, come up the track, and hit the outside wall. The wreck also collected LaJoie and Austin Hill after LaJoie spun and hit the outside wall along with Hill. Unhappy, Johnson had gotten into the AMR Safety team pickup to drive him to the infield care center but decided to come back out and stared down LaJoie as LaJoie went by Johnson to show him how mad he was. The race would restart on lap 184. On the restart, Kyle Busch took the lead from Kyle Larson. On the next lap, the fourth caution would fly when Austin Cindric spun down the backstretch and collected Bubba Wallace and Michael McDowell that almost had McDowell flip. The race would restart on lap 191. On the next lap, the 5th caution would fly once again when Harrison Burton spun off of turn 2. The race would restart on lap 198. On the restart, Kyle Larson would take the lead from Kyle Busch. At the same time, the 6th caution flew when Joey Logano spun off of turn 4 after he got checked up by Chase Briscoe. Kyle Busch won the race off of pit road but Todd Gilliland, Denny Hamlin, Chris Buescher, Justin Haley, Bubba Wallace, and Michael McDowell did not pit and Gilliland led the field to the restart on lap 206. On the restart, Denny Hamlin took the lead. On lap 208, Chris Buescher went to battle with Hamlin for the lead and led that lap before he got in front of Hamlin on the next lap. On lap 215, Hamlin took the lead back from Buescher. With 40 laps to go, Buescher went to take the lead on Hamlin and led that lap but could not get in front of Hamlin. Hamlin held on to the lead and began to pull away from Buescher. Depending if Hamlin could save enough fuel, it looked like it was going to be Hamlin to win it. But, Martin Truex Jr. came and took 2nd from Buescher with 8 laps to go and began to close in quickly to Hamlin after Truex had recently made a pit stop. It looked like it was going to be a finish between Hamlin and Truex. But with 7 laps to go, the 7th and final caution flew when Kyle Busch spun in turn 2. This would eventually have cars make pitstops and force the race into overtime.

Denny Hamlin won the race off of pit road with Chris Buescher in second and Kyle Larson in third and Hamlin led the field to the restart. On the restart, Larson went to make it a 3 wide pass for the lead but Buescher would get in front of Larson and take the lead while Hamlin began to fall back out of contention. On the last lap, Buescher remained in front even makes blocks on Larson for the lead. But off of turn 2, Larson got a run on Buescher and Larson was able to close in and got to Buescher's outside in turn 3. The two remained side by side with the third and fourth place cars in Chase Elliott and Martin Truex Jr., who restart 10th but closed in since he got four fresh tires on the pit stop, closing in on the two. Both Buescher and Larson remained side by side coming towards the finish line with both of them making contact twice and Buescher and Larson crossed the finish line together in a finish that looked too close to call from the naked eye. At first, the timing and scoring had Buescher ahead of Larson which caused Buescher's crew to start celebrating believing they had won. But upon further replay, it showed that Larson barely got ahead of Buescher across the finish line and they changed the decision saying Larson had won and Buescher finished in second. This would be Larson's second win of the season. The margin of victory was 0.001 seconds, which broke the long lasting record for the closest finish ever recorded in NASCAR Cup Series history, and marked the second closest finish ever recorded in all of NASCAR history behind the 2018 PowerShares QQQ 300 at Daytona in the Xfinity Series that saw Tyler Reddick beat Elliott Sadler by 0.0004 seconds. It was also the third time this season in the Top 3 Series of NASCAR that Ford had finished second in a photo finish. Even more interesting, all three have been to a Chevy car. The two previous photo finish losses for Ford against a Chevy was when Ryan Blaney lost to Daniel Suárez in the Cup Atlanta race by 0.003 seconds and Ryan Sieg lost to Sam Mayer in the Xfinity Texas race by 0.002 seconds. Chase Elliott, Martin Truex Jr., and Denny Hamlin rounded out the top 5 while Christopher Bell, Alex Bowman, Kyle Busch, Noah Gragson, and Michael McDowell rounded out the top 10.

== Race results ==
=== Stage results ===
Stage One Laps: 80

Pos	No	Driver	Team	Manufacturer	Points
1	11	Denny Hamlin	Joe Gibbs Racing	Toyota	10
2	1	Ross Chastain	Trackhouse Racing	Chevrolet	9
3	5	Kyle Larson	Hendrick Motorsports	Chevrolet	8
4	20	Christopher Bell	Joe Gibbs Racing	Toyota	7
5	17	Chris Buescher	RFK Racing	Ford	6
6	54	Ty Gibbs	Joe Gibbs Racing	Toyota	5
7	19	Martin Truex Jr.	Joe Gibbs Racing	Toyota	4
8	8	Kyle Busch	Richard Childress Racing	Chevrolet	3
9	10	Noah Gragson	Stewart-Haas Racing	Ford	2
10	9	Chase Elliott	Hendrick Motorsports	Chevrolet	1
Official stage one results

Stage Two Laps: 85

Pos	No	Driver	Team	Manufacturer	Points
1	17	Chris Buescher	RFK Racing	Ford	10
2	5	Kyle Larson	Hendrick Motorsports	Chevrolet	9
3	11	Denny Hamlin	Joe Gibbs Racing	Toyota	8
4	8	Kyle Busch	Richard Childress Racing	Chevrolet	7
5	19	Martin Truex Jr.	Joe Gibbs Racing	Toyota	6
6	54	Ty Gibbs	Joe Gibbs Racing	Toyota	5
7	48	Alex Bowman	Hendrick Motorsports	Chevrolet	4
8	45	Tyler Reddick	23XI Racing	Toyota	3
9	1	Ross Chastain	Trackhouse Racing	Chevrolet	2
10	10	Noah Gragson	Stewart-Haas Racing	Ford	1
Official stage two results

=== Final Stage results ===
Stage Three Laps: 102

Pos	Grid	No	Driver	Team	Manufacturer	Laps	Points
1	4	5	Kyle Larson	Hendrick Motorsports	Chevrolet	268	57
2	12	17	Chris Buescher	RFK Racing	Ford	268	51
3	9	9	Chase Elliott	Hendrick Motorsports	Chevrolet	268	35
4	13	19	Martin Truex Jr.	Joe Gibbs Racing	Toyota	268	43
5	14	11	Denny Hamlin	Joe Gibbs Racing	Toyota	268	50
6	1	20	Christopher Bell	Joe Gibbs Racing	Toyota	268	38
7	18	48	Alex Bowman	Hendrick Motorsports	Chevrolet	268	34
8	5	8	Kyle Busch	Richard Childress Racing	Chevrolet	268	39
9	3	10	Noah Gragson	Stewart-Haas Racing	Ford	268	31
10	8	34	Michael McDowell	Front Row Motorsports	Ford	268	27
11	30	6	Brad Keselowski	RFK Racing	Ford	268	26
12	26	12	Ryan Blaney	Team Penske	Ford	268	25
13	29	42	John Hunter Nemechek	Legacy Motor Club	Toyota	268	24
14	25	38	Todd Gilliland	Front Row Motorsports	Ford	268	23
15	17	4	Josh Berry (R)	Stewart-Haas Racing	Ford	268	22
16	21	47	Ricky Stenhouse Jr.	JTG Daugherty Racing	Chevrolet	268	21
17	23	23	Bubba Wallace	23XI Racing	Toyota	268	20
18	35	51	Justin Haley	Rick Ware Racing	Ford	268	19
19	2	1	Ross Chastain	Trackhouse Racing	Chevrolet	268	29
20	15	45	Tyler Reddick	23XI Racing	Toyota	268	20
21	10	14	Chase Briscoe	Stewart-Haas Racing	Ford	268	16
22	20	43	Corey Heim (i)	Legacy Motor Club	Toyota	268	0
23	36	24	William Byron	Hendrick Motorsports	Chevrolet	268	14
24	22	77	Carson Hocevar (R)	Spire Motorsports	Chevrolet	268	13
25	16	3	Austin Dillon	Richard Childress Racing	Chevrolet	268	12
26	28	7	Corey LaJoie	Spire Motorsports	Chevrolet	268	11
27	27	99	Daniel Suárez	Trackhouse Racing	Chevrolet	268	10
28	32	41	Ryan Preece	Stewart-Haas Racing	Ford	268	9
29	24	71	Zane Smith (R)	Spire Motorsports	Chevrolet	268	8
30	33	31	Daniel Hemric	Kaulig Racing	Chevrolet	268	7
31	38	16	Derek Kraus	Kaulig Racing	Chevrolet	268	6
32	6	54	Ty Gibbs	Joe Gibbs Racing	Toyota	267	15
33	34	33	Austin Hill (i)	Richard Childress Racing	Chevrolet	267	0
34	11	22	Joey Logano	Team Penske	Ford	266	3
35	37	15	Riley Herbst (i)	Rick Ware Racing	Ford	266	0
36	31	21	Harrison Burton	Wood Brothers Racing	Ford	262	1
37	7	2	Austin Cindric	Team Penske	Ford	184	1
38	19	84	Jimmie Johnson	Legacy Motor Club	Toyota	175	1
Official race results

=== Race statistics ===
- Lead changes: 27 among 10 different drivers
- Cautions/Laps: 7 for 43 laps
- Red flags: 0
- Time of race: 3 hours, 10 minutes, and 42 seconds
- Average speed: 126.481 miles per hour (203.551 km/h)
- Margin of Victory: 0.001 seconds

== Media ==
=== Television ===
Fox Sports covered their 13th race at the Kansas Speedway. Mike Joy, Clint Bowyer and three-time Kansas winner Kevin Harvick called the race from the broadcast booth. Jamie Little and Regan Smith handled pit road for the television side, and Larry McReynolds provided insight from the Fox Sports studio in Charlotte. Due to the rain delay, an MLS match originally scheduled for FS1 was moved entirely to FS2 to accommodate the delayed start of the race.

FS1
Booth announcers	Pit reporters	In-race analyst
Lap-by-lap: Mike Joy; Color-commentator: Clint Bowyer; Color-commentator: Kevin Harvick	Jamie Little; Regan Smith	Larry McReynolds

=== Radio ===
MRN had the radio call for the race which was also simulcasted on Sirius XM NASCAR Radio. Alex Hayden, Jeff Striegle and former crew chief Todd Gordon called the race in the booth when the field raced through the tri-oval. Mike Bagley covered the race from the Sunoco spotters stand outside turn 2 when the field was racing through turns 1 and 2. Kurt Becker called the race from a platform outside turn 4. Steve Post, Kim Coon & Chris Wilner worked pit road for the radio side.

MRN
Booth announcers	Turn announcers	Pit reporters
Lead announcer: Alex Hayden; Announcer: Jeff Striegle; Announcer: Todd Gordon	Turns 1 & 2: Mike Bagley; Turns 3 & 4: Kurt Becker	Steve Post; Kim Coon; Chris Wilner

== Standings after the race ==
Drivers' Championship standings

	Pos	Driver	Points
	1	Kyle Larson	467
	2	Martin Truex Jr.	438 (–29)
	3	Chase Elliott	412 (–55)
	4	Denny Hamlin	411 (–56)
	5	Tyler Reddick	374 (–93)
1	6	Ryan Blaney	367 (–100)
1	7	William Byron	362 (–105)
	8	Ty Gibbs	338 (–129)
	9	Alex Bowman	336 (–131)
	10	Ross Chastain	331 (–136)
3	11	Chris Buescher	316 (–151)
1	12	Kyle Busch	314 (–153)
4	13	Christopher Bell	296 (–171)
2	14	Chase Briscoe	290 (–177)
1	15	Brad Keselowski	287 (–180)
1	16	Bubba Wallace	283 (–184)
Official driver's standings

Manufacturers' Championship standings

Pos	Manufacturer	Points
1	Chevrolet	446
2	Toyota	435 (–11)
3	Ford	398 (–48)

- Note: Only the first 16 positions are included for the driver standings.
- . – Driver has clinched a position in the NASCAR Cup Series playoffs.

Previous race: 2024 Würth 400	NASCAR Cup Series; 2024 season	Next race: 2024 Goodyear 400
