= NASCAR O'Reilly Auto Parts Series at Talladega Superspeedway =

Annual motor race in Alabama, USA

NASCAR O'Reilly Auto Parts Series
- Venue: Talladega Superspeedway
- Location: Lincoln, Alabama, United States

Circuit information
- Surface: Asphalt
- Length: 2.66 mi (4.28 km)
- Turns: 4

Stock car racing events in the NASCAR O'Reilly Auto Parts Series have been held at Talladega Superspeedway, in Lincoln, Alabama during numerous seasons and times of year since 1992.

Large wrecks involving 20 or more cars have occurred a number of times in the history of the events, most notably in 2002, when 31 cars were involved in an accident. The remainder of the race, following a long red-flag period, had little resemblance to typical restrictor plate racing as only two cars were within short distance at the checkered flag and only three finished on the lead lap.

== Spring race ==
Ag-Pro 300
- Corporate sponsor: Ag-Pro
- First race: 1992
- Distance: 300.58 miles (483.74 km)
- Laps: 113; Stages 1/2: 25 each Final stage: 63
- Previous names: Fram Filter 500K (1992–1994); Humminbird Fishfinder 500K (1995–1996); Birmingham Auto Dealers 500K (1997); Touchstone Energy 300 (1998–2000); Subway 300 (2001); Aaron's 312 at Talladega (2002); Aaron's 312 (2003–2014); Winn-Dixie 300 (2015); Sparks Energy 300 (2016–2018); MoneyLion 300 (2019); Unhinged 300 (2020)
- Most wins (driver): Martin Truex Jr. (3)
- Most wins (team): Dale Earnhardt, Inc. Joe Gibbs Racing (5)
- Most wins (manufacturer): Chevrolet (23)

The Ag-Pro 300 is a NASCAR O'Reilly Auto Parts Series race at Talladega Superspeedway in Lincoln, Alabama that has been held since 1992. The race is held on the weekend of the NASCAR Cup Series' Jack Link's 500. Corey Day is the defending race winner.

=== History ===
From its inception in 1992 through 1996, the race was held in the summer, as a support race to the Alabama 500. When that race moved to the fall, this race moved to the spring as a support race to the corresponding Cup race.

In 2002, Aaron's assumed title sponsorship. In 2015, Winn-Dixie assumed naming rights. Since then, the race has had multiple sponsors including Sparks Energy, MoneyLion, Unhinged, and Ag-Pro, who also sponsored the fall race in the past.

=== Unique race distance ===
At its inception, the event debuted as a 117-lap, 500.86-kilometer (311.22 mi) event, the longest race on the Busch Series schedule. Automobile races in the United States measured in kilometers, especially those in NASCAR, are few. Through their history, ARCA races held at the track carried the more attractive and marketable "500" distance, even if it meant "500 kilometers" instead of miles (a custom also used at Riverside and Phoenix). The Busch Series race mimicked that precedent.

In 1998, fans complained about the use of kilometers, which was seen as a European custom. They argued that kilometers are rarely used in the United States, noting that the track measurement itself was still advertised in miles. Management changed the race to a 300-mile (480 km) event from 1998 to 2001. The change shortened the race distance by just four laps.

In 2002, the race returned to a 312-mile (≈500 kilometer) event. The race distance is only coincidental to that of 1992–1997. The distance, advertised unequivocally in miles this time, was set to reflect the sponsor's slogan ("3 ways to buy, 12 reasons to shop at Aaron's"). In 2015, the race returned to 300 miles.

=== Notable races ===
- 1993: The race lead changed 24 times at the stripe and several other times elsewhere as Dale Earnhardt battled Ernie Irvan and others. In the final laps Michael Waltrip squeezed ahead of Earnhardt but fell to second; Irvan led a three-car draft from several seconds back to challenge for the win, but on the final lap was hit by Tracy Leslie and flew twenty feet off the ground before landing on all four wheels; Earnhardt chopped off Leslie in Turn Three and Randy LaJoie stormed three wide to finish second.
- 1994: The lead changed 30 times and was interrupted by only two cautions, none for any kind of accident, as Ken Schrader and Terry Labonte rocketed to the 1–2 finish with two laps to go.
- 1995: Ward Burton and Randy LaJoie both went for wild rides in separate accidents. LaJoie's crash came when he was driving in relief of Tommy Houston; with eight laps to go Jeff Fuller spun out of fourth and LaJoie slid sideways then got launched into a tumble; behind them Robbie Reiser hit the wall, plowed through another car's nose and his throttle stuck open, sending him into a savage crash into the pit wall.
- 1996: In the final laps, amid a 20-car battle behind leader Greg Sacks, Todd Bodine was tagged, flew into the air, landed on his wheels, and pounded the inside wall. Sacks held on for the win, his first in NASCAR since 1985.
- 1999: Terry Labonte and Joe Nemechek got into a last-lap drag race and crossed the finish line nose to nose. It took nearly three minutes of examining the photo-finish video before NASCAR declared that Labonte had edged Nemecheck by inches at the stripe. It was Labonte's final Busch series win.
- 2001: Mike McLaughlin scores a surprising victory in the unsponsored #20 Joe Gibbs Racing Pontiac. McLaughlin won the race controversially, however, as he often blocked below the yellow line to prevent other cars from passing him. In the wake of Dale Earnhardt, Sr.'s death at the Daytona 500, and an attempt to preach safety, some drivers (most notably Jimmy Spencer) were irritated, leading to track limits implementation immediately at restrictor plate tracks.
- 2002: In the largest Big One in the Modern Era of NASCAR, Johnny Sauter flipped halfway down the backstretch and sparked a thirty one-car melee on lap 14 including Greg Biffle, Shane Hmiel, Randy LaJoie, Joe Nemechek, Mike McLaughlin, Jay Sauter, Scott Riggs, and others. Jason Keller, Stacy Compton, and Kenny Wallace and a few drivers behind the wreck did not get damage. Michael Waltrip had a save close to colliding. On lap 46, Stacy Compton's decal ripped off his hood and got stuck at the base of the windshield, leaving a blank hood. With 8 laps to go, Kenny Wallace blew an engine and finished 9th, leaving three cars on the lead lap and two in contention to win. Jason Keller won the race, Stacy Compton came in second, and supposed start and park Tim Fedewa (driving a second car for Biagi Brothers Racing, whose main driver Mike Wallace was involved in the big one) came in third, half a lap down.
- 2004: NASCAR mandated the roof blade aerodynamic package for the Busch Series cars, the return of this package since it was run in Winston Cup in 2001. Dale Earnhardt, Inc. cars finished 1–2 as Martin Truex Jr. led the last 23 laps. A seven-car crash erupted in Turn One with two to go, ending the racing under yellow. The lead changed 21 times.
- 2005: Rain forced the race to start later than schedules, at 4:30 p.m., and the first pileup occurred on lap 17 when Mike Wallace and Casey Mears got together in front of the entire pack heading towards turn 1 and leaving the track blocked for everyone behind them. The wreck involved Kyle Busch, points leader entering the day Carl Edwards, Michael Waltrip, Kenny Wallace, J. J. Yeley, Shane Hmiel, eventual winner Martin Truex Jr., and others. A second rain delay occurred on lap 64, leaving the hopes of getting in the entire race in jeopardy. On lap 83, the 2nd pileup occurred when the 87 of Joe Nemechek came across the 20 of Denny Hamlin and Mears, sending Mears on to his roof, collecting several cars. The second-place point man Clint Bowyer was caught in three separate incidents, but still finished 19th. By race end, only 23 of the 43 cars finished the race, with 16 on the lead lap. The race ended at 8:20 P.M., with the track in near-darkness. It was the first race in NASCAR's second-tier series to have aired on broadcast network television in prime-time, as the final 20 minutes of the NASCAR on Fox broadcast entered prime-time television.
- 2007: The lead changed hands 36 times, a record that stood until 2011. Casey Mears led 22 laps until Tony Stewart grabbed the lead with two to go, but then Bobby Labonte drafted past for the win on the final lap.
- 2009: The lead changed 33 times among 15 drivers. Matt Kenseth flipped over during the race. In a near-photo finish David Ragan rocketed from fourth in the final mile as leaders Ryan Newman and Dale Earnhardt Jr. got together and Ragan squeezed to the win on the high side.
- 2010: Due to a rain delay, this race was double-headed with the Sprint Cup race earlier in the day. Due to that race extended twelve laps due to three green-white-checker finish attempts (another first), there was only a half-hour break for drivers doing the doubleheader. Many drivers hence ended up doing over 840 miles of racing (combining the overall distances that the Sprint Cup and Nationwide races went). In a wild finish, Brad Keselowski stormed from the middle line of a three-abreast battle for the win, overtaking Sprint Cup race winner Kevin Harvick, while behind him, the Sprint Cup race's second-place finisher Jamie McMurray got spun out and Dennis Setzer flew into the catch fence in turn 4, in the spot where a nine car crash happened in the Sprint Cup race on lap 189. Carl Edwards also suffered from a crash in the early part of the event. Combined, the Sprint Cup and Nationwide races saw 121 lead changes (88 in the Sprint Cup, 33 in the Nationwide race).
- 2011: Points leader Ricky Stenhouse Jr. hit the wall and caused a red flag, then on Lap 88 Michael Waltrip got turned into the backstretch wall by Jamie McMurray, who was attempting to draft pole sitter Elliott Sadler. The wreck ended up taking out sixteen cars and bringing out another red flag. Kyle Busch and Joey Logano finished 1-2 while Mike Wallace got blasted by Sadler and flipped on his roof once, crossing the finish line in 17th. The race also broke the record of the most lead changes in Nationwide Series history with 56.
- 2013: NASCAR's new Air Titan track-drying system was able to dry the entire track in three hours despite heavy persistent rain. The first half saw over 20 lead changes and only two yellow flags. After a ten-car crash erupted with 25 scheduled laps to go, NASCAR decided to cut 10 laps off the distance to 107 due to incoming darkness. The race restarted on Lap 101 and seven laps to go but another yellow with two to go flew. Despite protests from drivers about pending darkness NASCAR set up one lone attempt at a Green-White-Checkered finish. The race restarted with 108 laps completed, and Regan Smith rocketed from outside the top six into a three-abreast pass on Joey Logano and Kasey Kahne; a huge wreck in the tri-oval erupted coming to get the checkered flag and it took NASCAR a few minutes to decide the winner due to the caution, thinking Kasey Kahne won in a three-wide finish at the line. The tape showed Smith ahead at the moment of caution, and was declared the winner, coming just 7 laps short of the scheduled 117 lap distance. The lead changed 47 times among 16 drivers.
- 2014: For 2014 NASCAR announced it would ban any form of push-drafting in the corners of restrictor plate races. The lead changed 27 times as Elliott Sadler, in a Joe Gibbs Racing Toyota, led 40 laps; Chris Buescher edged ahead of him at the white flag but Sadler drafted to the win on the final lap, his first in the Nationwide Series since 2012 and first with JGR. Daytona winner, Regan Smith, led 20 laps en route to a close third.
- 2020: A second race in October called the Ag-Pro 300 was added to the schedule in support of the YellaWood 500. It marked the first time that the Xfinity Series raced at Talladega in the fall. Justin Haley got his 3rd straight restrictor-plate track win, joining Dale Earnhardt Jr. in that regard.
- 2023: The race featured two flips. The first one was from Blaine Perkins. Perkins got hooked by a spinning Dexter Stacey and his car turned right and got hit by Jade Buford. Buford lifted Perkins' car up in the air and flipped over and tumbled violently down the backstretch six times before coming to a rest on its wheels. During the wreck, Kaz Grala hit one of Perkins' wheels as he went to avoid the wreck. Perkins walked out of his car under his own power but was transported to a hospital for further evaluation. The second flip was from Daniel Hemric. Hemric was leading in the closing laps of the race when he went down to block Sheldon Creed but misjudged it and got turned by Creed triggering the big one. Hemric's car got ramped up by Riley Herbst and his car rode along the turn 3 and 4 wall while also taking out the turn four camera in the process before his car flipped and came to a rest onto its roof. Hemric climbed out uninjured. Jeb Burton would win his second career Xfinity Series race and his second at this track while also scoring the first win for owner Jordan Anderson.

=== Past winners ===
Year	Date	No.	Driver	Team	Manufacturer	Race distance		Race time	Average speed (mph)	Report	Ref
Year	Date	No.	Driver	Team	Manufacturer	Laps	Miles (km)	Race time	Average speed (mph)	Report	Ref
1992	July 25	4	Ernie Irvan	Ernie Irvan	Chevrolet	117	311.22 (500.86)	1:57:55	158.359	Report	
1993	July 24	3	Dale Earnhardt	Dale Earnhardt, Inc.	Chevrolet	117	311.22 (500.86)	2:07:12	146.801	Report	
1994	July 23	52	Ken Schrader	Ken Schrader	Chevrolet	117	311.22 (500.86)	1:51:30	167.473	Report	
1995	July 22	23	Chad Little	Mark Rypien Motorsports	Ford	117	311.22 (500.86)	2:31:56	122.904	Report	
1996	July 27	29	Greg Sacks	Diamond Ridge Motorsports	Chevrolet	117	311.22 (500.86)	2:13:55	139.438	Report	
1997	April 26	60	Mark Martin	Roush Racing	Ford	117	311.22 (500.86)	1:50:32	168.937	Report	
1998	April 25	87	Joe Nemechek	NEMCO Motorsports	Chevrolet	113	300.58 (483.736)	2:32:35	118.196	Report	
1999	April 24	33	Terry Labonte	Labonte Motorsports	Chevrolet	113	300.58 (483.736)	1:59:36	150.793	Report	
2000	April 15	87	Joe Nemechek	NEMCO Motorsports	Chevrolet	113	300.58 (483.736)	1:57:13	153.859	Report	
2001	April 21	20	Mike McLaughlin	Joe Gibbs Racing	Pontiac	113	300.58 (483.736)	2:17:24	131.258	Report	
2002	April 20	57	Jason Keller	ppc Racing	Ford	117	311.22 (500.86)	1:58:25	157.691	Report	
2003	April 5	8	Dale Earnhardt Jr.	Chance 2 Motorsports	Chevrolet	117	311.22 (500.86)	2:11:43	114.768	Report	
2004	April 24	8	Martin Truex Jr.	Chance 2 Motorsports	Chevrolet	117	311.22 (500.86)	2:16:31	136.783	Report	
2005	April 30	8	Martin Truex Jr.	Chance 2 Motorsports	Chevrolet	120*	319.2 (513.702)	2:36:50	122.117	Report	
2006	April 29	8	Martin Truex Jr.	Dale Earnhardt, Inc.	Chevrolet	117	311.22 (500.86)	2:04:40	149.785	Report	
2007	April 28	77	Bobby Labonte	Kevin Harvick Inc.	Chevrolet	120*	319.2 (513.702)	2:23:46	133.216	Report	
2008	April 26	20	Tony Stewart	Joe Gibbs Racing	Toyota	117	311.22 (500.86)	2:20:17	133.111	Report	
2009	April 25	6	David Ragan	Roush Fenway Racing	Ford	120*	319.2 (513.702)	2:08:32	149.004	Report	
2010	April 25*	22	Brad Keselowski	Penske Racing	Dodge	120*	319.2 (513.702)	2:01:30	157.63	Report	
2011	April 16	18	Kyle Busch	Joe Gibbs Racing	Toyota	124*	329.84 (530.826)	2:36:18	126.618	Report	
2012	May 5	18	Joey Logano	Joe Gibbs Racing	Toyota	122*	324.52 (522.264)	2:22:54	136.258	Report	
2013	May 4	7	Regan Smith	JR Motorsports	Chevrolet	110*	292.6 (470.894)	2:11:44	133.269	Report	
2014	May 3	11	Elliott Sadler	Joe Gibbs Racing	Toyota	117	311.22 (500.86)	2:22:18	131.224	Report	
2015	May 2	22	Joey Logano	Team Penske	Ford	113	300.58 (483.736)	2:22:07	126.901	Report	
2016	April 30	1	Elliott Sadler*	JR Motorsports	Chevrolet	116*	308.56 (496.579)	2:19:45	132.477	Report	
2017	May 6	98	Aric Almirola	Biagi-DenBeste Racing	Ford	113	300.58 (483.736)	2:09:41	139.068	Report	
2018	April 28	23	Spencer Gallagher	GMS Racing	Chevrolet	115*	305.9 (492.298)	2:17:44	133.258	Report	
2019	April 27	2	Tyler Reddick	Richard Childress Racing	Chevrolet	113	300.58 (483.736)	2:22:02	126.976	Report	
2020	June 20*	11	Justin Haley	Kaulig Racing	Chevrolet	113	300.58 (483.736)	2:12:22	136.249	Report	
2021	April 24	10	Jeb Burton	Kaulig Racing	Chevrolet	90*	239.4 (385.276)	1:43:13	139.164	Report	
2022	April 23	9	Noah Gragson	JR Motorsports	Chevrolet	124*	329.84 (530.825)	2:40:52	123.024	Report	
2023	April 22	27	Jeb Burton	Jordan Anderson Racing	Chevrolet	121*	321.86 (517.982)	3:00:33	106.96	Report	
2024	April 20	2	Jesse Love	Richard Childress Racing	Chevrolet	124*	329.84 (530.825)	2:30:42	131.323	Report	
2025	April 26	21	Austin Hill	Richard Childress Racing	Chevrolet	113	300.58 (483.736)	2:10:31	138.18	Report	
2026	April 25	17	Corey Day	Hendrick Motorsports	Chevrolet	113	300.58 (483.736)	1:58:33	152.128	Report	
2027	April 24									Report	

- 2005, 2007, 2009–2013, 2016, 2018, 2022–2024: Races extended due to NASCAR overtime finishes.
- 2010: Race postponed from Saturday to Sunday due to rain.
- 2013: Race postponed same day due to rain; shortened to 107 laps due to darkness; extended to lap 110 due to NASCAR overtime.
- 2020: Race postponed from April 25 due to the COVID-19 pandemic.
- 2021: Race shortened due to rain.

==== Multiple winners (drivers) ====
# Wins	Driver	Years won
3	Martin Truex Jr.	2004–2006
2	Joe Nemechek	1998, 2000
2	Joey Logano	2012, 2015
2	Elliott Sadler	2014, 2016
2	Jeb Burton	2021, 2023

==== Multiple winners (teams) ====
# Wins	Team	Years won
5	Dale Earnhardt, Inc./Chance 2	1993, 2003–2006
5	Joe Gibbs Racing	2001, 2008, 2011, 2012, 2014
3	JR Motorsports	2013, 2016, 2022
3	Richard Childress Racing	2019, 2024, 2025
2	Roush Fenway Racing	1997, 2009
2	NEMCO Motorsports	1998, 2000
2	Team Penske	2010, 2015
2	Kaulig Racing	2020, 2021

==== Manufacturer wins ====
# Wins	Make	Years won
23	(United States) Chevrolet	1992–1994, 1996, 1998–2000, 2003–2007, 2013, 2016, 2018–2026
6	(United States) Ford	1995, 1997, 2002, 2009, 2015, 2017
4	(Japan) Toyota	2008, 2011, 2012, 2014
1	(United States) Pontiac	2001
1	(United States) Dodge	2010

== Fall race ==
TPG 250
- Corporate sponsor: The Progress Group
- First race: 2020
- Distance: 250.04 miles (402.40 km)
- Laps: 94; Stages 1/2: 20 each Final stage: 54
- Previous names: Ag-Pro 300 (2020); Sparks 300 (2021–2022); United Rentals 250 (2024–2025)
- Most wins (driver): Sammy Smith (2)
- Most wins (team): Kaulig Racing; JR Motorsports (2)
- Most wins (manufacturer): Chevrolet (6)

The TPG 250 (also known as The Progress Group 250) is a NASCAR O'Reilly Auto Parts Series race at Talladega Superspeedway in Lincoln, Alabama that has been held since 2020. The race is held on the weekend of the NASCAR Cup Series' YellaWood 500. Sammy Smith is the defending race winner.

=== History ===
The event was created in 2020 as a temporary round after the Mid-Ohio Sports Car Course race was canceled due to the COVID-19 pandemic; the inaugural running marked the first time that the Xfinity Series raced at Talladega in the fall. Justin Haley won the race to complete a sweep of the season's Talladega rounds. The race joined the Xfinity schedule in 2021 and is the second race in the series' playoffs.

The race was not on the schedule in 2023, as it was replaced by the Chicago Street Race. However, because of logistics of scheduling the second half of the Xfinity Series season in 2024 as part of NBC Sports' forced two-week break for the Olympic Games in Paris, the race return as part of YellaWood 500 weekend.

The race has been sponsored by Ag-Pro, who sponsors the spring race, Sparks, United Rentals, and The Progress Group (TPG).

=== Past winners ===
Year	Date	No.	Driver	Team	Manufacturer	Race distance		Race time	Average speed (mph)	Report	Ref
Year	Date	No.	Driver	Team	Manufacturer	Laps	Miles (km)	Race time	Average speed (mph)	Report	Ref
2020	October 3	11	Justin Haley	Kaulig Racing	Chevrolet	113	300.58 (483.736)	2:08:24	140.458	Report	
2021	October 2	68	Brandon Brown	Brandonbilt Motorsports	Chevrolet	108*	287.28 (462.332)	2:04:55	128.486	Report	
2022	October 1	16	A. J. Allmendinger	Kaulig Racing	Chevrolet	113	300.58 (483.736)	1:53:33	158.827	Report	
2023	Not held										
2024	October 5	8	Sammy Smith	JR Motorsports	Chevrolet	98*	260.68 (419.523)	2:05:12	124.927	Report	
2025	October 18	21	Austin Hill	Richard Childress Racing	Chevrolet	100*	266 (428.084)	2:01:32	131.322	Report	
2026	October 24	8	Sammy Smith	JR Motorsports	Chevrolet	94	250.4 (402.40)	1:47:30	139.557	Report	
2027	October 30									Report	

==== Notes ====
- 2020: Race moved from Mid-Ohio Sports Car Course due to COVID-19 pandemic.
- 2021: Race shortened due to darkness after a lengthy red flag due to track repairs.
- 2024 and 2025: Races extended due to NASCAR overtime.

==== Multiple winners (drivers) ====
# Wins	Driver	Years won
2	Sammy Smith	2024, 2026

==== Multiple winners (teams) ====
# Wins	Team	Years won
2	Kaulig Racing	2020, 2022
2	JR Motorsports	2024, 2026
1	Brandonbilt Motorsports	2021
1	Richard Childress Racing	2025

==== Manufacturer wins ====
# Wins	Make	Years won
6	(United States) Chevrolet	2020–2022, 2024–2026

Previous race: NFPA 250	NASCAR O'Reilly Auto Parts Series; Ag-Pro 300	Next race: Andy's Frozen Custard 300

Previous race: Timberland PRO 200	NASCAR O'Reilly Auto Parts Series; TPG 250	Next race: National Debt Relief 250
