= 2024 Ambetter Health 400 =

Race details
- Race 2 of 36 in the 2024 NASCAR Cup Series
- Date: February 25, 2024
- Location: Atlanta Motor Speedway in Hampton, Georgia
- Course: Permanent racing facility
- Course length: 1.54 miles (2.48 km)
- Distance: 260 laps, 400.4 mi (644.4 km)
- Average speed: 115.398 miles per hour (185.715 km/h)

Pole position
Driver	Michael McDowell	Front Row Motorsports
- Time: 30.999

Most laps led
Driver	Todd Gilliland	Front Row Motorsports
- Laps: 58

Winner
No. 99	Daniel Suárez	Trackhouse Racing

Television in the United States
- Network: Fox
- Announcers: Mike Joy, Clint Bowyer, and Kevin Harvick

Radio in the United States
- Radio: PRN
- Booth announcers: Doug Rice and Mark Garrow
- Turn announcers: Rob Albright (1 & 2) and Pat Patterson (3 & 4)

The 2024 Ambetter Health 400 was a NASCAR Cup Series race held on February 25, 2024, at Atlanta Motor Speedway in Hampton, Georgia. Contested over 260 laps on the 1.54-mile-long (2.48 km) asphalt quad-oval intermediate speedway (with superspeedway rules), it was the second race of the 2024 NASCAR Cup Series season. Daniel Suárez, driving the #99 for Trackhouse Racing, won in a three-wide photo finish with Ryan Blaney and Kyle Busch, marking the 4th closest finish in NCS history.

== Report ==
=== Background ===
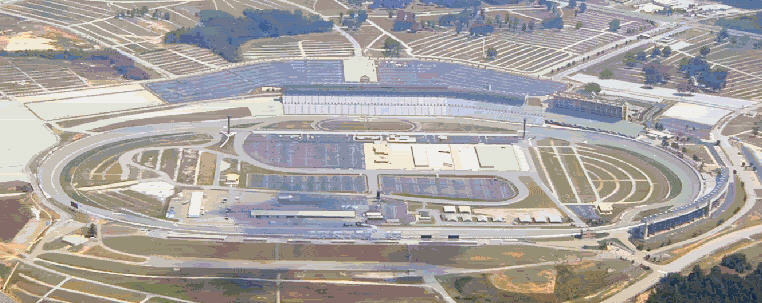
Atlanta Motor Speedway, the track where the race was held.

Atlanta Motor Speedway (formerly Atlanta International Raceway) is a 1.54-mile race track in Hampton, Georgia, United States, 20 miles (32 km) south of Atlanta. It has annually hosted NASCAR Cup Series stock car races since its inauguration in 1960.

The venue was bought by Speedway Motorsports in 1990. In 1994, 46 condominiums were built over the northeastern side of the track. In 1997, to standardize the track with Speedway Motorsports' other two intermediate ovals, the entire track was almost completely rebuilt. The frontstretch and backstretch were swapped, and the configuration of the track was changed from oval to quad-oval, with a new official length of 1.54-mile (2.48 km) where before it was 1.522-mile (2.449 km). The project made the track one of the fastest on the NASCAR circuit. In July 2021 NASCAR announced that the track would be reprofiled for the 2022 season to have 28 degrees of banking and would be narrowed from 55 to 40 feet which the track claims will turn racing at the track similar to restrictor plate superspeedways. Despite the reprofiling being criticized by drivers, construction began in August 2021 and wrapped up in December 2021. The track has seating capacity of 71,000 to 125,000 people depending on the tracks configuration.

This Cup race will be first time without A. J. Allmendinger since Talladega Superspeedway in fall of 2022.

==== Entry list ====
- (R) denotes rookie driver.
- (i) denotes driver who is ineligible for series driver points.

No.	Driver	Team	Manufacturer
1	Ross Chastain	Trackhouse Racing	Chevrolet
2	Austin Cindric	Team Penske	Ford
3	Austin Dillon	Richard Childress Racing	Chevrolet
4	Josh Berry (R)	Stewart–Haas Racing	Ford
5	Kyle Larson	Hendrick Motorsports	Chevrolet
6	Brad Keselowski	RFK Racing	Ford
7	Corey LaJoie	Spire Motorsports	Chevrolet
8	Kyle Busch	Richard Childress Racing	Chevrolet
9	Chase Elliott	Hendrick Motorsports	Chevrolet
10	Noah Gragson	Stewart–Haas Racing	Ford
11	Denny Hamlin	Joe Gibbs Racing	Toyota
12	Ryan Blaney	Team Penske	Ford
14	Chase Briscoe	Stewart–Haas Racing	Ford
15	Kaz Grala (R)	Rick Ware Racing	Ford
16	Josh Williams (i)	Kaulig Racing	Chevrolet
17	Chris Buescher	RFK Racing	Ford
19	Martin Truex Jr.	Joe Gibbs Racing	Toyota
20	Christopher Bell	Joe Gibbs Racing	Toyota
21	Harrison Burton	Wood Brothers Racing	Ford
22	Joey Logano	Team Penske	Ford
23	Bubba Wallace	23XI Racing	Toyota
24	William Byron	Hendrick Motorsports	Chevrolet
31	Daniel Hemric	Kaulig Racing	Chevrolet
34	Michael McDowell	Front Row Motorsports	Ford
38	Todd Gilliland	Front Row Motorsports	Ford
41	Ryan Preece	Stewart–Haas Racing	Ford
42	John Hunter Nemechek	Legacy Motor Club	Toyota
43	Erik Jones	Legacy Motor Club	Toyota
45	Tyler Reddick	23XI Racing	Toyota
47	Ricky Stenhouse Jr.	JTG Daugherty Racing	Chevrolet
48	Alex Bowman	Hendrick Motorsports	Chevrolet
51	Justin Haley	Rick Ware Racing	Ford
54	Ty Gibbs	Joe Gibbs Racing	Toyota
71	Zane Smith (R)	Spire Motorsports	Chevrolet
77	Carson Hocevar (R)	Spire Motorsports	Chevrolet
78	B. J. McLeod (i)	Live Fast Motorsports	Chevrolet
99	Daniel Suárez	Trackhouse Racing	Chevrolet
Official entry list

== Qualifying ==
Michael McDowell scored the pole for the race with a time of 30.999 and a speed of 178.844 mph (287.822 km/h). It was the first career pole for McDowell after 467 starts.

=== Qualifying results ===
Pos	No.	Driver	Team	Manufacturer	R1	R2
1	34	Michael McDowell	Front Row Motorsports	Ford	31.180	30.999
2	22	Joey Logano	Team Penske	Ford	31.206	31.072
3	8	Kyle Busch	Richard Childress Racing	Chevrolet	31.268	31.105
4	38	Todd Gilliland	Front Row Motorsports	Ford	31.226	31.132
5	5	Kyle Larson	Hendrick Motorsports	Chevrolet	31.346	31.176
6	12	Ryan Blaney	Team Penske	Ford	31.310	31.206
7	17	Chris Buescher	RFK Racing	Ford	31.323	31.291
8	2	Austin Cindric	Team Penske	Ford	31.251	31.296
9	14	Chase Briscoe	Stewart–Haas Racing	Ford	31.251	31.300
10	3	Austin Dillon	Richard Childress Racing	Chevrolet	31.313	31.304
11	24	William Byron	Hendrick Motorsports	Chevrolet	31.348	—
12	19	Martin Truex Jr.	Joe Gibbs Racing	Toyota	31.368	—
13	11	Denny Hamlin	Joe Gibbs Racing	Toyota	31.375	—
14	4	Josh Berry (R)	Stewart–Haas Racing	Ford	31.377	—
15	10	Noah Gragson	Stewart–Haas Racing	Ford	31.385	—
16	21	Harrison Burton	Wood Brothers Racing	Ford	31.397	—
17	48	Alex Bowman	Hendrick Motorsports	Chevrolet	31.423	—
18	23	Bubba Wallace	23XI Racing	Toyota	31.430	—
19	45	Tyler Reddick	23XI Racing	Toyota	31.431	—
20	41	Ryan Preece	Stewart–Haas Racing	Ford	31.444	—
21	1	Ross Chastain	Trackhouse Racing	Chevrolet	31.467	—
22	20	Christopher Bell	Joe Gibbs Racing	Toyota	31.475	—
23	99	Daniel Suárez	Trackhouse Racing	Chevrolet	31.476	—
24	6	Brad Keselowski	RFK Racing	Ford	31.479	—
25	54	Ty Gibbs	Joe Gibbs Racing	Toyota	31.484	—
26	31	Daniel Hemric	Kaulig Racing	Chevrolet	31.506	—
27	47	Ricky Stenhouse Jr.	JTG Daugherty Racing	Chevrolet	31.514	—
28	9	Chase Elliott	Hendrick Motorsports	Chevrolet	31.519	—
29	71	Zane Smith (R)	Spire Motorsports	Chevrolet	31.636	—
30	16	Josh Williams (i)	Kaulig Racing	Chevrolet	31.665	—
31	51	Justin Haley	Rick Ware Racing	Ford	31.671	—
32	7	Corey LaJoie	Spire Motorsports	Chevrolet	31.707	—
33	15	Kaz Grala (R)	Rick Ware Racing	Ford	31.718	—
34	42	John Hunter Nemechek	Legacy Motor Club	Toyota	31.979	—
35	77	Carson Hocevar (R)	Spire Motorsports	Chevrolet	32.003	—
36	78	B. J. McLeod (i)	Live Fast Motorsports	Chevrolet	32.384	—
37	43	Erik Jones	Legacy Motor Club	Toyota	33.691	—
Official qualifying results

== Race ==
=== Stage 1 ===
Kyle Busch took the lead from pole sitter Michael McDowell and Busch led the first lap. The first caution did not take long as it flew on lap 2 for the big one in turn 1. It started when Todd Gilliland checked up and ended up stacking up the outside line and it caused Austin Dillon to get bumped from behind by Martin Truex Jr. and Dillon went spinning going into turn 1. Behind Dillon, Bubba Wallace got turned by Ryan Preece which blocked the track causing the big crash. The wreck collected 19 cars. The cars involved were Austin Dillon, Chase Elliott, Noah Gragson, Josh Williams, Martin Truex Jr., Christopher Bell, Harrison Burton, Bubba Wallace, Daniel Hemric, Ryan Preece, John Hunter Nemechek, Erik Jones, Tyler Reddick, Alex Bowman, Justin Haley, Ty Gibbs, Carson Hocevar, B. J. McLeod, and Daniel Suárez. The race would restart on lap 11. On the restart, Kyle Larson took the lead from Kyle Busch. Busch would take it back on lap 12. On lap 16, Larson took the lead back. Busch would take it back the following lap on lap 17. Kyle Larson would take the lead on lap 21. On lap 23, Ryan Blaney took the lead. Larson would take it back the following lap. Blaney would take the lead on lap 25. On the same lap, the second caution flew when Chris Buescher spun in turn 4. The race would restart on lap 32. On lap 34, Kyle Busch took the lead. On lap 41, Michael McDowell took the lead. Busch would take it back on lap 42. McDowell would take the lead back on lap 44. On lap 51, Ryan Blaney took the lead. McDowell would take it back on lap 52. On lap 53, the third caution flew when Denny Hamlin spun down the frontstretch after he got turned by Kyle Busch. The race would restart on lap 60 which was the last lap of stage 1. Michael McDowell held off the pack and McDowell won stage 1.

=== Stage 2 ===
Some drivers pitted while others stayed out including Todd Gilliland and Gilliland led the field to the restart on lap 69. On lap 99, Joey Logano took the lead. On lap 103, Todd Gilliland took the lead but Logano took it back the next lap. On lap 113, Chris Buescher took the lead. Logano would take it back the next lap. Green flag pit stops would soon begin. Joey Logano went to pit on lap 128 giving the lead to Kyle Larson. On lap 132, Brad Keselowski took the lead. Keselowski would pit the following lap giving the lead back to Larson. Larson would pit on lap 135 giving the lead to Ricky Stenhouse Jr. At the same time, Michael McDowell and William Byron crashed in the turn 3 pit road entrance. No caution flew as they were out of harms way and got back going again. On lap 136, Bubba Wallace took the lead. After everything cycled through, Austin Cindric was the new leader. On lap 157, Joey Logano took the lead but was immediately passed by Cindric on the same lap and Cindric took it back. On the last lap of stage 2, Joey Logano fell back to 4th and tried to go up in front of Chris Buescher but misjudged and turned across Buescher's nose off of turn 2 and Logano, Buescher, and Denny Hamlin crashed in turn 2 bringing out the 5th caution and ending stage 2 under caution which Austin Cindric would win.

=== Final stage ===
Todd Gilliland won the race off of pit road and he led the field to the restart on lap 171. On lap 175, the 6th caution flew when Kaz Grala spun in turns 1 and 2. The race would restart on lap 181. On lap 183, Martin Truex Jr. took the lead. On lap 185, Gilliland would take the lead back. Truex would take it back on lap 187. Gilliland would take it back on lap 189. On lap 193, Kyle Larson took the lead from Gilliland. On lap 199, Truex retook the lead. At the same time, the 7th caution flew when Elliott spun in turn 3 after he got turned by Chastain. Ty Gibbs also spun trying to avoid the wreck. Truex won the race off of pit road but Michael McDowell did not pit and McDowell led the field to the restart on lap 206. On lap 207, Truex regained the lead for a lap before McDowell took it back. On lap 210, Truex went to take the lead when Briscoe made it three wide for the lead on Truex and McDowell, but Truex led that lap. Cindric went to the inside of McDowell, Truex, and Briscoe with 50 laps to go and Cindric made a 4 wide pass and took the lead.

With 45 laps to go, Hamlin took the lead. With 42 to go, the 8th caution flew when Keselowski, Larson, and LaJoie crashed in turn 4. The race would restart with 35 laps to go. With 30 laps to go, Blaney took the lead, leading two laps before ceding the lead to Busch. Blaney would take the lead back the following lap. With 21 to go, the 9th caution flew for a multi car crash. It started when Briscoe got turned by Hamlin in a 4 wide pack in turn 3, collecting Burton, Truex, Gilliland, Gibbs, and Haley. The race was red flagged for 11 minutes and 25 seconds to allow for cleanup. The race would restart with 15 laps to go. With 13 to go, Suárez took the lead. With 12 to go, the 10th and final caution would fly when Josh Berry spun down in front of Carson Hocevar which made Hocevar's front end come off the ground while also collecting Elliott.

The race would restart for the final time with 5 laps to go. On the restart, Blaney took the lead from Suárez. Blaney held on to it even making some good blocks on the pack that tried to get past him. On the last lap down the backstretch, Kyle Busch got to the outside of Blaney with Suárez to the outside and it was a three-wide battle for the lead. The three drivers remained side by side through turns 3 and 4, even barely making contact. The three remained three-wide and crossed the finish line together in a finish that was too close to call from the naked eye. NASCAR reviewed video footage and determined that Suárez won the race, Blaney finished in second, and Busch finished in third. This was Suárez's second career Cup Series victory. The margin between Suárez and Busch was 0.007 seconds while the margin between Suárez and Blaney was 0.003 seconds, the fourth closest finish in NASCAR history behind the 2003 Carolina Dodge Dealers 400 and the 2011 Aaron's 499 both at 0.002 seconds, and the 0.001 second margin of victory at the AdventHealth 400 later that year at Kansas. The finish also gained some national attention as some people compared the finish to the three-wide finish of the Dinoco 400 at the beginning of the 2006 film Cars. Some have argued it is the greatest finish in NASCAR's history. Austin Cindric and Bubba Wallace rounded out the top 5 while Ricky Stenhouse Jr., Ross Chastain, Michael McDowell, Chris Buescher, and Ty Gibbs rounded out the top 10.

== Race results ==
=== Stage Results ===
Stage One Laps: 60

Pos	No	Driver	Team	Manufacturer	Points
1	34	Michael McDowell	Front Row Motorsports	Ford	10
2	12	Ryan Blaney	Team Penske	Ford	9
3	1	Ross Chastain	Trackhouse Racing	Chevrolet	8
4	5	Kyle Larson	Hendrick Motorsports	Chevrolet	7
5	8	Kyle Busch	Richard Childress Racing	Chevrolet	6
6	19	Martin Truex Jr.	Joe Gibbs Racing	Toyota	5
7	47	Ricky Stenhouse Jr.	JTG Daugherty Racing	Chevrolet	4
8	23	Bubba Wallace	23XI Racing	Toyota	3
9	24	William Byron	Hendrick Motorsports	Chevrolet	2
10	38	Todd Gilliland	Front Row Motorsports	Ford	1
Official stage one results

Stage Two Laps: 100

Pos	No	Driver	Team	Manufacturer	Points
1	2	Austin Cindric	Team Penske	Ford	10
2	5	Kyle Larson	Hendrick Motorsports	Chevrolet	9
3	12	Ryan Blaney	Team Penske	Ford	8
4	99	Daniel Suárez	Trackhouse Racing	Chevrolet	7
5	19	Martin Truex Jr.	Joe Gibbs Racing	Toyota	6
6	38	Todd Gilliland	Front Row Motorsports	Ford	5
7	6	Brad Keselowski	RFK Racing	Ford	4
8	21	Harrison Burton	Wood Brothers Racing	Ford	3
9	14	Chase Briscoe	Stewart–Haas Racing	Ford	2
10	9	Chase Elliott	Hendrick Motorsports	Chevrolet	1
Official stage two results

=== Final Stage Results ===
Stage Three Laps: 100

Pos	Grid	No	Driver	Team	Manufacturer	Laps	Points
1	23	99	Daniel Suárez	Trackhouse Racing	Chevrolet	260	47
2	6	12	Ryan Blaney	Team Penske	Ford	260	52
3	3	8	Kyle Busch	Richard Childress Racing	Chevrolet	260	40
4	8	2	Austin Cindric	Team Penske	Ford	260	43
5	18	23	Bubba Wallace	23XI Racing	Toyota	260	35
6	27	47	Ricky Stenhouse Jr.	JTG Daugherty Racing	Chevrolet	260	35
7	21	1	Ross Chastain	Trackhouse Racing	Chevrolet	260	38
8	1	34	Michael McDowell	Front Row Motorsports	Ford	260	39
9	7	17	Chris Buescher	RFK Racing	Ford	260	28
10	25	54	Ty Gibbs	Joe Gibbs Racing	Toyota	260	27
11	16	21	Harrison Burton	Wood Brothers Racing	Ford	260	29
12	12	19	Martin Truex Jr.	Joe Gibbs Racing	Toyota	260	36
13	32	7	Corey LaJoie	Spire Motorsports	Chevrolet	260	24
14	33	15	Kaz Grala (R)	Rick Ware Racing	Ford	260	23
15	28	9	Chase Elliott	Hendrick Motorsports	Chevrolet	260	23
16	20	41	Ryan Preece (Note: The Stewart–Haas Racing entry of Ryan Preece was docked 35 points for improper roof air deflectors found in pre-race inspection.)	Stewart–Haas Racing	Ford	260	-14
17	11	24	William Byron	Hendrick Motorsports	Chevrolet	260	22
18	26	31	Daniel Hemric	Kaulig Racing	Chevrolet	260	19
19	35	77	Carson Hocevar (R)	Spire Motorsports	Chevrolet	260	18
20	31	51	Justin Haley	Rick Ware Racing	Ford	260	17
21	34	42	John Hunter Nemechek	Legacy Motor Club	Toyota	260	16
22	10	3	Austin Dillon	Richard Childress Racing	Chevrolet	260	15
23	13	11	Denny Hamlin	Joe Gibbs Racing	Toyota	259	14
24	36	78	B. J. McLeod (i)	Live Fast Motorsports	Chevrolet	257	0
25	37	43	Erik Jones	Legacy Motor Club	Toyota	256	12
26	4	38	Todd Gilliland	Front Row Motorsports	Ford	256	17
27	17	48	Alex Bowman	Hendrick Motorsports	Chevrolet	255	10
28	2	22	Joey Logano	Team Penske	Ford	255	9
29	14	4	Josh Berry (R)	Stewart–Haas Racing	Ford	250	8
30	19	45	Tyler Reddick	23XI Racing	Toyota	243	7
31	9	14	Chase Briscoe	Stewart–Haas Racing	Ford	239	8
32	5	5	Kyle Larson	Hendrick Motorsports	Chevrolet	232	21
33	24	6	Brad Keselowski	RFK Racing	Ford	218	8
34	22	20	Christopher Bell	Joe Gibbs Racing	Toyota	148	3
35	29	71	Zane Smith (R)	Spire Motorsports	Chevrolet	75	2
36	15	10	Noah Gragson (Note: The Stewart–Haas Racing entry of Noah Gragson was docked 35 points for improper roof air deflectors found in pre-race inspection.)	Stewart–Haas Racing	Ford	66	-34
37	30	16	Josh Williams (i)	Kaulig Racing	Chevrolet	2	0
Official race results

=== Race statistics ===
- Lead changes: 48 among 14 different drivers
- Cautions/Laps: 10 for 65 laps
- Red flags: 1 for 11 minutes and 25 seconds
- Time of race: 3 hours, 28 minutes and 11 seconds
- Average speed: 115.398 miles per hour (185.715 km/h)
- Margin of Victory: 0.003 seconds

== Media ==
=== Television ===
Fox Sports was carried by Fox in the United States. Mike Joy, Clint Bowyer, and three-time Atlanta winner Kevin Harvick called the race from the broadcast booth. Jamie Little and Regan Smith handled pit road for the television side, and Larry McReynolds provided insight from the Fox Sports studio in Charlotte.

Fox
Booth announcers	Pit reporters	In-race analyst
Lap-by-lap: Mike Joy; Color-commentator: Clint Bowyer; Color-commentator: Kevin Harvick	Jamie Little; Regan Smith	Larry McReynolds

=== Radio ===
The race was broadcast on radio by the Performance Racing Network and simulcast on Sirius XM NASCAR Radio. Doug Rice and Mark Garrow called the race from the booth when the field raced down the front stretch. Rob Albright called the race from atop a billboard outside of turn 2 when the field raced through turns 1 and 2, and Doug Turnbull called the race from a billboard outside of turn 3 when the field raced through turns 3 and 4. On pit road, PRN was manned by Brad Gillie, Brett McMillan, Alan Cavanna and Wendy Venturini.

PRN
Booth announcers	Turn announcers	Pit reporters
Lead announcer: Doug Rice; Announcer: Mark Garrow	Turns 1 & 2: Rob Albright; Turns 3 & 4: Doug Turnbull	Brad Gillie; Brett McMillan; Alan Cavanna; Wendy Venturini

== Standings after the race ==
Drivers' Championship standings

	Pos	Driver	Points
7	1	Kyle Busch	77
1	2	William Byron	76 (–1)
8	3	Austin Cindric	76 (–1)
1	4	Bubba Wallace	74 (–3)
18	5	Ryan Blaney	69 (–8)
2	6	Chase Elliott	65 (–12)
17	7	Daniel Suárez	64 (–13)
9	8	Ross Chastain	62 (–15)
7	9	Alex Bowman	60 (–17)
6	10	Martin Truex Jr.	60 (–17)
4	11	Kyle Larson	58 (–19)
2	12	Corey LaJoie	57 (–20)
7	13	John Hunter Nemechek	53 (–24)
5	14	Ty Gibbs	50 (–27)
6	15	Chris Buescher	49 (–28)
13	16	Christopher Bell	47 (–30)
Official driver's standings

Manufacturers' Championship standings

Pos	Manufacturer	Points
1	Chevrolet	80
2	Toyota	66 (–14)
3	Ford	63 (–17)

- Note: Only the first 16 positions are included for the driver standings.

== Notes ==
Previous race: 2024 Daytona 500	NASCAR Cup Series; 2024 season	Next race: 2024 Pennzoil 400
