= List of the closest NASCAR Truck Series finishes =

The NASCAR Craftsman Truck Series has had many close finishes since its inception in 1995. The first points-paying race, won by Mike Skinner, had a margin of victory of nine hundredths of a second. The closest recorded finish in series history came six months later, as Skinner lost to Butch Miller by just one thousandth of a second, or 1.25in.

== Closest finishes ==
Craftsman Truck Series closest finishes
Rank	Race	Margin (seconds)	Winner	2nd Place	Track	Date
1	1995 Total Petroleum 200	0.001	Butch Miller	Mike Skinner	Colorado National Speedway	July 15, 1995
2	2010 Mountain Dew 250 Fueled by Fred's	0.002	Kyle Busch	Aric Almirola	Talladega Superspeedway	October 30, 2010
3	2008 Cool City Customs 200	0.005	Erik Darnell	Johnny Benson, Jr.	Michigan International Speedway	June 14, 2008
3	2015 North Carolina Education Lottery 200	0.005	Kasey Kahne	Erik Jones	Charlotte Motor Speedway	May 15, 2015
5	1995 Fas Mart Supertruck Shootout	0.006	Terry Labonte	Geoffrey Bodine	Richmond Raceway	September 7, 1995
6	2005 World Financial Group 200	0.008	Ron Hornaday, Jr.	Bobby Labonte	Atlanta Motor Speedway	March 18, 2005
7	2020 NextEra Energy 250	0.010	Grant Enfinger	Jordan Anderson	Daytona International Speedway	February 14, 2020
8	1999 NAPA 300k	0.013	Mike Wallace	Jack Sprague	Pikes Peak International Raceway	May 16, 1999
9	2007 Mountain Dew 250	0.014	Todd Bodine	Rick Crawford	Talladega Superspeedway	October 6, 2007
9	2012 Ford EcoBoost 200	0.014	Cale Gale	Kyle Busch	Homestead-Miami Speedway	November 16, 2012
11	2014 NextEra Energy Resources 250	0.016	Kyle Busch	Timothy Peters	Daytona International Speedway	February 21, 2014
12	2025 Fr8 208	0.017	Kyle Busch	Stewart Friesen	Atlanta Motor Speedway	February 22, 2025
13	2008 Qwik Liner Las Vegas 350	0.020	Mike Skinner	Erik Darnell	Las Vegas Motor Speedway	September 20, 2008
14	1996 Florida Dodge Dealers 400	0.022	Dave Rezendes	Jack Sprague	Homestead-Miami Speedway	March 17, 1996
14	2002 Chevy Silverado 150	0.022	Kevin Harvick	Ted Musgrave	Phoenix Raceway	November 8, 2002
16	2018 Corrigan Oil 200	0.025	Brett Moffitt	Johnny Sauter	Michigan International Speedway	August 11, 2018
17	2003 Florida Dodge Dealers 250	0.027	Rick Crawford	Travis Kvapil	Daytona International Speedway	February 14, 2003
17	2019 Sugarlands Shine 250	0.027	Spencer Boyd	Todd Gilliland	Talladega Superspeedway	October 12, 2019
19	2007 Chevy Silverado HD 250	0.031	Jack Sprague	Johnny Benson, Jr.	Daytona International Speedway	February 16, 2007
20	2016 Chevrolet Silverado 250	0.034	John Hunter Nemechek	Cole Custer	Canadian Tire Motorsports Park	September 4, 2016
21	2021 NextEra Energy 250	0.036	Ben Rhodes	Jordan Anderson	Daytona International Speedway	February 12, 2021
22	2018 Eldora Dirt Derby	0.038	Chase Briscoe	Grant Enfinger	Eldora Speedway	July 18, 2018
23	2024 Love's RV Stop 225	0.041	Grant Enfinger	Taylor Gray	Talladega Superspeedway	October 4, 2024
24	2026 Fresh From Florida 250	0.044	Chandler Smith	Gio Ruggiero	Daytona International Speedway	February 13, 2026
25	2004 American Racing Wheels 200	0.049	Todd Bodine	Ted Musgrave	Auto Club Speedway	October 2, 2004
25	2014 Chevrolet Silverado 250	0.049	Ryan Blaney	German Quiroga	Canadian Tire Motorsport Park	August 31, 2014
27	2013 UNOH 200	0.050	Kyle Busch	Timothy Peters	Bristol Motor Speedway	August 21, 2013
28	2021 Chevrolet Silverado 250	0.052	Tate Fogleman	Tyler Hill	Talladega Superspeedway	October 2, 2021
29	2009 Mountain Dew 250 Fueled by Fred's	0.057	Kyle Busch	Aric Almirola	Talladega Superspeedway	October 31, 2009
29	2011 Coca-Cola 250 Powered by Fred's	0.057	Mike Wallace	Ron Hornaday, Jr.	Talladega Superspeedway	October 22, 2011
31	2025 Love's RV Stop 225	0.059	Gio Ruggiero	Corey Heim	Talladega Superspeedway	October 17, 2025
32	2011 NextEra Energy Resources 250	0.061	Michael Waltrip	Elliott Sadler	Daytona International Speedway	February 18, 2011
33	2001 Kroger 200	0.062	Jack Sprague	Kevin Harvick	Richmond Raceway	September 6, 2001
34	2026 DQS Solutions & Staffing 250	0.065	Corey Heim	Kaden Honeycutt	Michigan International Speedway	June 6, 2026
35	2017 Las Vegas 350	0.066	Ben Rhodes	Christopher Bell	Las Vegas Motor Speedway	September 30, 2017
36	2010 NextEra Energy Resources 250	0.068	Timothy Peters	Todd Bodine	Daytona International Speedway	February 13, 2010
37	2008 Mountain Dew 250 Fueled by Winn-Dixie	0.074	Todd Bodine	Ron Hornaday, Jr.	Talladega Superspeedway	October 4, 2008
38	2008 Chevy Silverado 250	0.077	Todd Bodine	Kyle Busch	Daytona International Speedway	February 15, 2008
39	2013 Ford EcoBoost 200	0.081	Kyle Busch	Ryan Blaney	Homestead-Miami Speedway	November 15, 2013
40	2023 Love's RV Stop 250	0.089	Brett Moffitt	Ben Rhodes	Talladega Superspeedway	September 30, 2023
41	1995 Skoal Bandit Copper World Classic	0.090	Mike Skinner	Terry Labonte	Phoenix Raceway	February 5, 1995
41	2001 Auto Club 200	0.090	Ted Musgrave	Rick Crawford	Auto Club Speedway	November 3, 2001
41	2026 Black's Tire 200 (Rockingham)	0.090	Corey Heim	Kaden Honeycutt	Rockingham Speedway	April 3, 2026
44	2026 Love's RV Stop 225	0.091	Sammy Smith	Tyler Ankrum	Talladega Superspeedway	October 23, 2026
45	2018 PPG 400	0.092	Johnny Sauter	Stewart Friesen	Texas Motor Speedway	June 8, 2018
46	2016 Careers for Veterans 200*	0.098	Brett Moffitt	Timothy Peters	Michigan International Speedway	August 27, 2016
46	2018 NextEra Energy Resources 250	0.098	Johnny Sauter	Justin Haley	Daytona International Speedway	February 16, 2018
48	1994 Supertruck Portland 20	0.100	Rob MacCachren	Gary Collins	Portland Speedway	August 19, 1994
48	1995 NASCAR Supertruck 25	0.100	Geoff Bodine	Mike Skinner	Homestead-Miami Speedway	November 4, 1995
50	2002 Michigan 200	0.102	Robert Pressley	Jason Leffler	Michigan International Speedway	July 27, 2002
50	2022 North Carolina Education Lottery 200	0.102	Ross Chastain	Grant Enfinger	Charlotte Motor Speedway	May 27, 2022
52	2018 Alpha Energy Solutions 250	0.106	John Hunter Nemechek	Kyle Benjamin	Martinsville Speedway	March 26, 2018
53	2016 Fred's 250	0.107	Grant Enfinger	Spencer Gallagher	Talladega Superspeedway	October 22, 2016
54	2010 VFW 200	0.111	Aric Almirola	Todd Bodine	Michigan International Speedway	June 12, 2010
54	2020 Clean Harbors 200	0.111	Brett Moffitt	Sheldon Creed	Kansas Speedway	October 17, 2020
54	2025 DQS Solutions & Staffing 250	0.111	Stewart Friesen	Grant Enfinger	Michigan International Speedway	June 7, 2025
57	2006 Con-way Freight 200	0.112	Johnny Benson	Mark Martin	Michigan International Speedway	June 17, 2006
57	2024 SpeedyCash.com 250	0.112	Kyle Busch	Corey Heim	Texas Motor Speedway	April 12, 2024
59	2002 Florida Dodge Dealers 250	0.113	Robert Pressley	Ted Musgrave	Daytona International Speedway	February 15, 2002
60	2026 Fr8 208208]]	0.114	Kyle Busch	Carson Hocevar	Atlanta Motor Speedway	February 21, 2026
61	2003 O'Reilly 200	0.115	Ted Musgrave	Travis Kvapil	Memphis International Raceway	June 21, 2003
62	2006 Sam's Town 400	0.116	Todd Bodine	Mike Skinner	Texas Motor Speedway	June 9, 2006
63	2022 O'Reilly Auto Parts 150	0.119	Parker Kligerman	Zane Smith	Mid-Ohio Sports Car Course	July 9, 2022
64	2009 American Commercial Lines 200	0.122	Kyle Busch	Kevin Harvick	Atlanta Motor Speedway	March 7, 2009
64	2022 SpeedyCash.com 220	0.122	Stewart Friesen	Christian Eckes	Texas Motor Speedway	May 20, 2022
66	2019 Corrigan Oil 200	0.125	Austin Hill	Sheldon Creed	Michigan International Speedway	August 10, 2019
67	1995 Pizza Plus 150	0.130	Joe Ruttman	Geoff Bodine	Bristol Motor Speedway	June 23, 1995
67	1995 Stevens Beil/Genuine Car Parts 150	0.130	Ron Hornaday, Jr.	Rick Carelli	Flemington Speedway	August 19, 1995
69	2006 racetickets.com 200	0.131	Mark Martin	Todd Bodine	Auto Club Speedway	February 24, 2006
70	2009 Built Ford Tough 225	0.135	Ron Hornaday, Jr.	Mike Skinner	Kentucky Speedway	July 18, 2009
71	2003 Craftsman 200	0.139	Bobby Hamilton	Ted Musgrave	Darlington Raceway	March 14, 2003
71	2013 WinStar World Casino 400K	0.139	Jeb Burton	Ty Dillon	Texas Motor Speedway	June 7, 2013
73	2004 Florida Dodge Dealers 250	0.141	Carl Edwards	Travis Kvapil	Daytona International Speedway	February 13, 2004
73	2024 Weather Guard Truck Race	0.141	Christian Eckes	Kyle Busch	Bristol Motor Speedway	March 16, 2024
75	2018 World of Westgate 200	0.142	Grant Enfinger	Justin Haley	Las Vegas Motor Speedway	September 14, 2018
76	2014 Fred's 250	0.143	Timothy Peters	Tayler Malsam	Talladega Superspeedway	October 18, 2014
77	2026 Buckle Up South Carolina 200	0.145	Corey Heim	Ross Chastain	Darlington Raceway	March 20, 2026
78	2005 Quaker Steak & Lube 200	0.149	Kyle Busch	Terry Cook	Charlotte Motor Speedway	May 20, 2005
78	2006 O'Reilly Auto Parts 200	0.149	Mark Martin	Todd Bodine	Bristol Motor Speedway	August 23, 2006
78	2008 O'Reilly Auto Parts 250	0.149	Ron Hornaday, Jr.	Jack Sprague	Kansas Speedway	April 26, 2008
81	1994 Supertruck Mesa Marin 20	0.150	P.J. Jones	Gary Collins	Mesa Marin Raceway	July 30, 1994
82	1999 goracing.com 200	0.153	Greg Biffle	Jay Sauter	Michigan International Speedway	July 24, 1999
83	2015 Careers for Veterans 200	0.157	Kyle Busch	Ryan Blaney	Michigan International Speedway	August 15, 2015
84	1999 O'Reilly Auto Parts 200	0.165	Jack Sprague	Dennis Setzer	I-70 Speedway	May 22, 1999
85	2013 SFP 250	0.167	Matt Crafton	Joey Coulter	Kansas Speedway	April 20, 2013
86	2012 American Ethanol 200	0.168	Ryan Blaney	Ty Dillon	Iowa Speedway	September 15, 2012
87	2005 UAW-GM Ohio 250	0.169	Bobby Hamilton	Jack Sprague	Mansfield Motor Speedway	May 15, 2005
88	2017 JAG Metals 350	0.170	Johnny Sauter	Austin Cindric	Texas Motor Speedway	November 3, 2017
89	2015 NextEra Energy Resources 250	0.173	Tyler Reddick	Erik Jones	Daytona International Speedway	February 20, 2015
89	2022 Fr8 208	0.173	Corey Heim	Ben Rhodes	Atlanta Motor Speedway	March 19, 2022
91	2017 LTi Printing 200	0.176	Bubba Wallace	Christopher Bell	Michigan International Speedway	August 12, 2017
92	2013 North Carolina Education Lottery 200	0.177	Kyle Larson	Joey Logano	Rockingham Speedway	April 14, 2013
93	2004 Built Ford Tough 225	0.179	Bobby Hamilton	Dennis Setzer	Kentucky Speedway	July 10, 2004
94	2008 North Carolina Education Lottery 200	0.184	Matt Crafton	Chad McCumbee	Charlotte Motor Speedway	May 16, 2008
95	2003 Ford 200	0.186	Bobby Hamilton	Rick Crawford	Homestead-Miami Speedway	November 14, 2003
95	2010 EnjoyIllinois.com 225	0.186	Kyle Busch	Todd Bodine	Chicagoland Speedway	August 27, 2010
97	2002 O'Reilly Auto Parts 200	0.187	Travis Kvapil	Terry Cook	Memphis International Raceway	June 22, 2002
97	2017 Buckle Up in Your Truck 225	0.187	Christopher Bell	Brandon Jones	Kentucky Speedway	July 6, 2017
97	2024 Fr8 208	0.187	Kyle Busch	Ty Majeski	Atlanta Motor Speedway	February 24, 2024
100	2007 Sam's Town 400	0.188	Todd Bodine	Mike Skinner	Texas Motor Speedway	June 8, 2007

== See also ==
- Photo finish
- List of the closest NASCAR Cup Series finishes
- List of the closest NASCAR O'Reilly Auto Parts Series finishes
