= List of the closest NASCAR Cup Series finishes =

Kyle Larson (No. 5) beating Chris Buescher (No. 17) in the 2024 AdventHealth 400 at Kansas Speedway

NASCAR's premier racing division, the NASCAR Cup Series, has seen many close finishes since the electronic scoring system was instituted in May during the 1993 season. As of 2026, the closest margin of victory in the NASCAR Cup Series is 0.001 seconds at the 2024 AdventHealth 400 at Kansas Speedway, as Kyle Larson crossed the finish line inches ahead of Chris Buescher.

== History ==
Ricky Craven (No. 32) edges out Kurt Busch (No. 97) at the line in the 2003 Carolina Dodge Dealers 400, it was the closest NASCAR finish until the 2024 AdventHealth 400.

Prior to the introduction of integrated electronic scoring in May 1993, margins of victory were scored in laps, car lengths, feet, or inches, using handheld stopwatches or analog timing clocks. This occasionally led to controversy, such as occurred in the inaugural Daytona 500 in 1959. Initially, NASCAR declared the race won by Johnny Beauchamp, but many observers felt that Lee Petty had won. It took 61 hours before video evidence established Petty as the winner.

Beginning with the 1993 Save Mart Supermarkets 300K, scoring was standardized to the thousandth of a second using transponders located on the vehicles and timing lines around the track. Geoff Bodine won the first event using this electronic scoring, finishing 0.53 seconds ahead of Ernie Irvan.

=== Closest finishes ===
*	Event was not part of the regular season

NASCAR Cup Series closest finishes
Rank	Race	Margin	Winner	2nd Place	Track	Date
1	2024 AdventHealth 400	0.001	Kyle Larson	Chris Buescher	Kansas Speedway	May 5, 2024
2	2003 Carolina Dodge Dealers 400	0.002	Ricky Craven	Kurt Busch	Darlington Raceway	March 16, 2003
2	2011 Aaron's 499	0.002	Jimmie Johnson	Clint Bowyer	Talladega Superspeedway	April 17, 2011
4	2024 Ambetter Health 400	0.003	Daniel Suárez	Ryan Blaney	Atlanta Motor Speedway	February 25, 2024
5	2001 Gatorade Duel 2*	0.004	Mike Skinner	Dale Earnhardt Jr.	Daytona International Speedway	February 15, 2001
6	1993 DieHard 500	0.005	Dale Earnhardt	Ernie Irvan	Talladega Superspeedway	July 25, 1993
6	2007 Pepsi 400	0.005	Jamie McMurray	Kyle Busch	Daytona International Speedway	July 7, 2007
6	2010 Gatorade Duel 1*	0.005	Jimmie Johnson	Kevin Harvick	Daytona International Speedway	February 11, 2010
6	2011 Gatorade Duel 2*	0.005	Jeff Burton	Clint Bowyer	Daytona International Speedway	February 17, 2011
7	2001 Cracker Barrel Old Country Store 500	0.006	Kevin Harvick	Jeff Gordon	Atlanta Motor Speedway	March 11, 2001
7	2024 YellaWood 500	0.006	Ricky Stenhouse Jr.	Brad Keselowski	Talladega Superspeedway	October 6, 2024
12	2019 1000Bulbs.com 500	0.007	Ryan Blaney	Ryan Newman	Talladega Superspeedway	October 14, 2019
12	2020 GEICO 500	0.007	Ryan Blaney	Ricky Stenhouse Jr.	Talladega Superspeedway	June 22, 2020
14	1994 Pepsi 400	0.008	Jimmy Spencer	Ernie Irvan	Daytona International Speedway	July 2, 1994
15	2000 Cracker Barrel Old Country Store 500	0.010	Dale Earnhardt	Bobby Labonte	Atlanta Motor Speedway	March 12, 2000
15	2004 Subway 400	0.010	Matt Kenseth	Kasey Kahne	North Carolina Speedway	February 22, 2004
15	2016 Daytona 500	0.010	Denny Hamlin	Martin Truex Jr.	Daytona International Speedway	February 21, 2016
15	2016 Good Sam 500	0.010	Kevin Harvick	Carl Edwards	Phoenix International Raceway	March 13, 2016
19	2010 Aaron's 499	0.011	Kevin Harvick	Jamie McMurray	Talladega Superspeedway	April 25, 2010
20	2012 Budweiser Shootout*	0.013	Kyle Busch	Tony Stewart	Daytona International Speedway	February 18, 2012
22	2010 Gatorade Duel 2*	0.014	Kasey Kahne	Tony Stewart	Daytona International Speedway	February 11, 2010
22	2020 Daytona 500	0.014	Denny Hamlin	Ryan Blaney	Daytona International Speedway	February 17, 2020
23	2016 Sprint Showdown*	0.015	Kyle Larson	Chase Elliott	Charlotte Motor Speedway	May 20, 2016
24	2005 Ford 400	0.017	Greg Biffle	Mark Martin	Homestead-Miami Speedway	November 20, 2005
26	2011 Good Sam Club 500	0.018	Clint Bowyer	Jeff Burton	Talladega Superspeedway	October 23, 2011
26	2023 Bluegreen Vacations Duel #1*	0.018	Joey Logano	Christopher Bell	Daytona International Speedway	February 16, 2023
27	2007 Daytona 500	0.020	Kevin Harvick	Mark Martin	Daytona International Speedway	February 18, 2007
28	1994 Diehard 500	0.025	Jimmy Spencer	Bill Elliott	Talladega Superspeedway	July 24, 1994
29	2005 Coca-Cola 600	0.027	Jimmie Johnson	Bobby Labonte	Lowe's Motor Speedway	May 29, 2005
30	2004 Samsung/Radio Shack 500	0.028	Elliott Sadler	Kasey Kahne	Texas Motor Speedway	April 5, 2004
30	2005 Golden Corral 500	0.028	Carl Edwards	Jimmie Johnson	Atlanta Motor Speedway	March 20, 2005
32	1997 Pepsi 400	0.029	John Andretti	Terry Labonte	Daytona International Speedway	July 5, 1997
32	2026 Bank of America 400	0.029	Chase Briscoe	Christopher Bell	Charlotte Motor Speedway	October 11, 2026
34	2005 Gatorade Duel 1*	0.030	Michael Waltrip	Dale Earnhardt Jr.	Daytona International Speedway	February 17, 2005
35	2025 Coke Zero Sugar 400	0.031	Ryan Blaney	Daniel Suárez	Daytona International Speedway	August 23, 2025
36	2022 Daytona 500	0.036	Austin Cindric	Bubba Wallace	Daytona International Speedway	February 20, 2022
37	2021 Bluegreen Vacations Duel #1*	0.041	Aric Almirola	Christopher Bell	Daytona International Speedway	February 11, 2021
37	2026 YellaWood 500	0.041	Kyle Larson	William Byron	Talladega Superspeedway	October 25, 2026
39	2006 UAW Daimler-Chrysler 400	0.045	Jimmie Johnson	Matt Kenseth	Las Vegas Motor Speedway	March 12, 2006
40	2022 YellaWood 500	0.046	Chase Elliott	Ryan Blaney	Talladega Superspeedway	October 2, 2022
41	2024 Coke Zero Sugar 400	0.047	Harrison Burton	Kyle Busch	Daytona International Speedway	August 24, 2024
42	2025 Shriners Children's 500	0.049	Christopher Bell	Denny Hamlin	Phoenix Raceway	March 9, 2025
43	1995 Diehard 500	0.050	Sterling Marlin	Dale Jarrett	Talladega Superspeedway	July 23, 1995
44	1998 Exide Select Batteries 400	0.051	Jeff Burton	Jeff Gordon	Richmond International Raceway	September 12, 1998
45	2008 Amp Energy 500	0.052	Tony Stewart	Paul Menard	Talladega Superspeedway	October 5, 2008
46	2026 Food City 500	0.055	Ty Gibbs	Ryan Blaney	Bristol Motor Speedway	April 12, 2026
47	Bluegreen Vacations Duel #1*	0.056	Tyler Reddick	Chase Elliott	Daytona International Speedway	February 15, 2024
47	2025 Jack Link's 500	0.056	Austin Cindric	Kyle Larson	Talladega Superspeedway	April 27, 2025
49	2021 Bluegreen Vacations Duel #2*	0.057	Austin Dillon	Bubba Wallace	Daytona International Speedway	February 11, 2021
50	2011 Budweiser Shootout*	0.058	Kurt Busch	Jamie McMurray	Daytona International Speedway	February 12, 2011
51	1994 AC Delco 500*	0.06	Dale Earnhardt	Rick Mast	Rockingham Speedway	October 23, 1994
51	2002 Aaron's 499	0.06	Dale Earnhardt Jr.	Michael Waltrip	Talladega Superspeedway	April 21, 2002
51	2014 Budweiser Duel 1*	0.06	Matt Kenseth	Kasey Kahne	Daytona International Speedway	February 20, 2014
54	2023 YellaWood 500	0.061	Ryan Blaney	William Byron	Talladega Superspeedway	October 1, 2023
55	2007 Food City 500	0.064	Kyle Busch	Jeff Burton	Bristol Motor Speedway	March 25, 2007
56	2007 Goody's Cool Orange 500	0.065	Jimmie Johnson	Jeff Gordon	Martinsville Speedway	April 1, 2007
56	2011 Gatorade Duel 1*	0.065	Kurt Busch	Regan Smith	Daytona International Speedway	February 17, 2011
56	2026 America 250 Florida Duel at Daytona Duel 2*	0.065	Chase Elliott	Carson Hocevar	Daytona International Speedway	February 12, 2026
59	2007 UAW-Ford 500	0.066	Jeff Gordon	Jimmie Johnson	Talladega Superspeedway	October 7, 2007
60	1994 Winston Select 500	0.067	Dale Earnhardt	Ernie Irvan	Talladega Superspeedway	May 1, 1994
61	2007 Lenox Industrial Tools 300	0.068	Denny Hamlin	Jeff Gordon	New Hampshire Motor Speedway	July 1, 2007
61	2026 Quaker State 400	0.068	Ryan Blaney	Christopher Bell	EchoPark Speedway	July 12–13, 2026
61	2024 Ally 400	0.068	Joey Logano	Zane Smith	Nashville Superspeedway	June 30, 2024
64	2025 Hollywood Casino 400	0.069	Chase Elliott	Denny Hamlin	Kansas Speedway	September 28, 2025
65	2019 Quaker State 400	0.076	Kurt Busch	Kyle Busch	Kentucky Speedway	July 13, 2019
66	2021 FireKeepers Casino 400	0.077	Ryan Blaney	William Byron	Michigan International Speedway	August 22, 2021
67	1995 Busch Clash*	0.080	Dale Earnhardt	Sterling Marlin	Daytona International Speedway	February 12, 1995
67	2005 MBNA NASCAR RacePoints 400	0.080	Jimmie Johnson	Kyle Busch	Dover Motor Speedway	September 25, 2005
69	2004 Banquet 400	0.081	Joe Nemechek	Ricky Rudd	Kansas Speedway	October 10, 2004
69	2018 Can-Am Duel #2*	0.081	Chase Elliott	Kevin Harvick	Daytona International Speedway	February 15, 2018
71	2023 South Point 400	0.082	Kyle Larson	Christopher Bell	Las Vegas Motor Speedway	October 15, 2023
71	2025 The Duel at Daytona #1*	0.082	Bubba Wallace	William Byron	Daytona International Speedway	February 13, 2025
73	2001 Kmart 400	0.085	Jeff Gordon	Ricky Rudd	Michigan International Speedway	June 10, 2001
74	2020 Yellawood 500	0.086	Denny Hamlin	Erik Jones	Talladega Superspeedway	October 4, 2020
75	1996 Gatorade Twin 125 #2*	0.090	Ernie Irvan	Ken Schrader	Daytona International Speedway	February 15, 1996
76	1997 Miller 500	0.091	Ricky Rudd	Mark Martin	Dover Motor Speedway	June 1, 1997
76	2008 Gatorade Duel #2	0.091	Denny Hamlin	Tony Stewart	Daytona International Speedway	February 14, 2008
78	2008 Daytona 500	0.092	Ryan Newman	Kurt Busch	Daytona International Speedway	February 17, 2008
78	2010 Coke Zero 400	0.092	Kevin Harvick	Kasey Kahne	Daytona International Speedway	July 3, 2010
80	2013 Budweiser Duel #2*	0.093	Kyle Busch	Kasey Kahne	Daytona International Speedway	February 21, 2013
80	2020 Consumers Energy 400	0.093	Kevin Harvick	Denny Hamlin	Michigan International Speedway	August 9, 2020
82	2002 Gatorade 125 #2*	0.094	Michael Waltrip	Tony Stewart	Daytona International Speedway	February 14, 2002
83	2003 EA Sports 500	0.095	Michael Waltrip	Dale Earnhardt Jr.	Talladega Superspeedway	September 28, 2003
83	2017 GEICO 500	0.095	Ricky Stenhouse Jr.	Jamie McMurray	Talladega Superspeedway	May 7, 2017
85	2025 NASCAR Cup Series Championship Race	0.097	Ryan Blaney	Brad Keselowski	Phoenix Raceway	November 9, 2025
86	2009 Sharpie 500	0.098	Kyle Busch	Mark Martin	Bristol Motor Speedway	August 22, 2009
86	2023 Coke Zero Sugar 400	0.098	Chris Buescher	Brad Keselowski	Daytona International Speedway	August 26, 2023
88	1994 Gatorade Twin 125 #2*	0.100	Dale Earnhardt	Sterling Marlin	Daytona International Speedway	February 17, 1994
88	1995 Goody's 500	0.100	Terry Labonte	Dale Earnhardt	Bristol Motor Speedway	August 26, 1995
88	1996 Miller 400	0.100	Ernie Irvan	Jeff Gordon	Richmond Raceway	September 7, 1996
91	1997 Goody's Headache Powder 500	0.102	Dale Jarret	Mark Martin	Bristol Motor Speedway	August 23, 1997
91	2018 Advance Auto Parts Clash*	0.102	Brad Keselowski	Joey Logano	Daytona International Speedway	February 11, 2018
91	2021 GEICO 500	0.102	Brad Keselowski	William Byron	Talladega Superspeedway	April 25, 2021
94	2001 Gatorade 125 #1	0.103	Sterling Marlin	Jerry Nadeau	Daytona International Speedway	February 15, 2001
95	2018 1000Bulbs.com 500	0.105	Aric Almirola	Clint Bowyer	Talladega Superspeedway	October 14, 2018
95	2022 GEICO 500	0.105	Ross Chastain	Austin Dillon	Talladega Superspeedway	April 24, 2022
97	2013 Coke Zero 400	0.107	Jimmie Johnson	Tony Stewart	Daytona International Speedway	July 6, 2013
97	2018 First Data 500	0.107	Joey Logano	Denny Hamlin	Martinsville Speedway	October 28, 2018
99	2009 Coke Zero 400	0.110	Tony Stewart	Jimmie Johnson	Daytona International Speedway	July 4, 2009
100	2014 5-hour Energy 400	0.112	Jeff Gordon	Kevin Harvick	Kansas Speedway	May 10, 2014

== See also ==
- Photo finish
- List of the closest NASCAR O'Reilly Auto Parts Series finishes
- List of the closest NASCAR Truck Series finishes
