= 2007 Aaron's 312 =

Race details
- Map of Speedway
- Date: April 28, 2007
- Official name: 2007 Aaron's 312
- Location: Talladega Superspeedway in Lincoln, Alabama
- Course: Superspeedway
- Course length: 2.66 miles (4.28 km)
- Distance: 120 laps, 319 mi (513.381 km)
- Scheduled distance: 117 laps, 311.2 mi (500.83 km)
- Weather: Partly cloudy
- Average speed: 133.216 mph (214.390 km/h)
- Attendance: 75,000

Pole position
Driver	Brad Coleman	Joe Gibbs Racing
- Time: 51.959

Most laps led
Driver	Casey Mears	Hendrick Motorsports
- Laps: 52

Winner
No. 77	Bobby Labonte	Kevin Harvick Inc.

Television in the United States
- Network: ABC
- Announcers: Jerry Punch, Dale Jarrett, Andy Petree

The 2007 Aaron's 312 was a NASCAR Busch Series race held at Talladega Superspeedway in Lincoln, Alabama on April 28, 2007. The race was the 16th iteration of the event. It was also the 10th race of the 2007 NASCAR Busch Series. Brad Coleman won the pole for the race becoming one of the youngest pole winners in Busch Series history while Casey Mears led the most laps. But it would be Bobby Labonte winning the race in a close finish with his former Cup Series teammate and his teammate at Kevin Harvick Inc. in Tony Stewart, beating Stewart by .052 seconds in a last lap pass. But the race was most remembered for when Kyle Busch suffered in one of the most wildest crashes in the history of the racetrack.

== Background ==
Talladega Superspeedway, the race track where the race was held.

The track, Talladega Superspeedway, is one of six superspeedways to hold NASCAR races, the others being Daytona International Speedway, Auto Club Speedway, Indianapolis Motor Speedway, Pocono Raceway and Michigan International Speedway. The standard track at the speedway is a four-turn superspeedway that is 2.66 miles (4.28 km) long. The track's turns are banked at thirty-three degrees, while the front stretch, the location of the finish line, is banked at 16.5 degrees. The back stretch has a two-degree banking. Talladega Superspeedway can seat up to 143,231 people.

=== Entry list ===
- (R) denotes rookie driver

#	Driver	Team	Make
0	Eric McClure	D.D.L. Motorsports	Chevrolet
01	Morgan Shepherd	D.D.L. Motorsports	Chevrolet
1	J. J. Yeley	Phoenix Racing	Chevrolet
2	Clint Bowyer	Richard Childress Racing	Chevrolet
4	Regan Smith	Ginn Racing	Chevrolet
05	Justin Ashburn	Day Enterprise Racing	Chevrolet
5	Kyle Busch	Hendrick Motorsports	Chevrolet
6	David Ragan (R)	Roush Racing	Ford
7	Mike Wallace	Phoenix Racing	Chevrolet
8	Dale Earnhardt Jr.	Dale Earnhardt Inc.	Chevrolet
9	Kasey Kahne	Gillett Evernham Motorsports	Dodge
10	Dave Blaney	Braun Racing	Toyota
11	Martin Truex Jr.	Dale Earnhardt Inc.	Chevrolet
14	Kyle Krisiloff (R)	Carl A. Haas Motorsports	Ford
16	Greg Biffle	Roush Racing	Ford
17	Danny O'Quinn Jr.	Roush Racing	Ford
18	Brad Coleman (R)	Joe Gibbs Racing	Chevrolet
20	Aric Almirola	Joe Gibbs Racing	Chevrolet
21	Kevin Harvick	Richard Childress Racing	Chevrolet
22	Mike Bliss	Fitz Racing	Dodge
24	Casey Mears	Hendrick Motorsports	Chevrolet
25	David Gilliland	Team Rensi Motorsports	Ford
27	Ward Burton	Brewco Motorsports	Ford
28	Robert Richardson Jr.	Jay Robinson Racing	Chevrolet
29	Scott Wimmer	Richard Childress Racing	Chevrolet
33	Tony Stewart	Kevin Harvick Inc.	Chevrolet
35	Bobby Hamilton Jr.	Team Rensi Motorsports	Ford
36	Brent Sherman	McGill Motorsports	Chevrolet
37	Jamie McMurray	Brewco Motorsports	Ford
38	Jason Leffler	Braun Racing	Toyota
41	Reed Sorenson	Chip Ganassi Racing	Dodge
42	Juan Pablo Montoya	Chip Ganassi Racing	Dodge
47	Jon Wood	Wood Brothers Racing/JTG Racing	Ford
52	Donnie Neuenberger	Means Racing	Ford
59	Marcos Ambrose (R)	Wood Brothers Racing/JTG Racing	Ford
60	Carl Edwards	Roush Racing	Ford
66	Steve Wallace	Rusty Wallace Inc.	Dodge
70	Justin Diercks	ML Motorsports	Chevrolet
77	Bobby Labonte	Kevin Harvick Inc.	Chevrolet
88	Shane Huffman	JR Motorsports	Chevrolet
90	Stephen Leicht	Robert Yates Racing	Ford
99	David Reutimann	Michael Waltrip Racing	Toyota
Official Entry list

== Qualifying ==
Brad Coleman won the pole with a time of 51.959 and a speed of 184.299. Coleman became the third youngest pole winner in Busch Series history at 19 years old behind a pair of 18 year olds such as Joey Logano in 2008, Trevor Bayne in 2009, Chase Elliott in 2014, Ty Gibbs in 2021, and Sammy Smith in 2023 all of whom behind 17 year old Casey Atwood in 1998.

Grid	No.	Driver	Team	Manufacturer	Time	Speed
1	18	Brad Coleman (R)	Joe Gibbs Racing	Chevrolet	51.959	184.299
2	10	Dave Blaney	Braun Racing	Toyota	52.026	184.062
3	38	Jason Leffler	Braun Racing	Toyota	52.062	183.935
4	24	Casey Mears	Hendrick Motorsports	Chevrolet	52.131	183.691
5	27	Ward Burton	Brewco Motorsports	Ford	52.204	183.434
6	2	Clint Bowyer	Richard Childress Racing	Chevrolet	52.233	183.332
7	6	David Ragan (R)	Roush Racing	Ford	52.283	183.157
8	17	Danny O'Quinn Jr.	Roush Racing	Ford	52.284	183.154
9	60	Carl Edwards	Roush Racing	Ford	52.307	183.073
10	37	Jamie McMurray	Brewco Motorsports	Ford	52.325	183.010
11	4	Regan Smith	Ginn Racing	Chevrolet	52.336	182.972
12	5	Kyle Busch	Hendrick Motorsports	Chevrolet	52.348	182.930
13	11	Martin Truex Jr.	Dale Earnhardt Inc.	Chevrolet	52.369	182.856
14	41	Reed Sorenson	Chip Ganassi Racing	Dodge	52.392	182.776
15	99	David Reutimann	Michael Waltrip Racing	Toyota	52.402	182.741
16	25	David Gilliland	Team Rensi Motorsports	Ford	52.430	182.644
17	16	Greg Biffle	Roush Racing	Ford	52.449	182.577
18	47	Jon Wood	Wood Brothers/JTG Racing	Ford	52.459	182.543
19	20	Aric Almirola	Joe Gibbs Racing	Chevrolet	52.464	182.525
20	42	Juan Pablo Montoya	Chip Ganassi Racing	Dodge	52.497	182.410
21	29	Scott Wimmer	Richard Childress Racing	Chevrolet	52.505	182.383
22	35	Bobby Hamilton Jr.	Team Rensi Motorsports	Ford	52.509	182.369
23	14	Kyle Krisiloff (R)	Carl A. Haas Motorsports	Ford	52.539	182.265
24	9	Kasey Kahne	Gillett Evernham Motorsports	Dodge	52.551	182.223
25	21	Kevin Harvick	Richard Childress Racing	Chevrolet	52.566	182.171
26	8	Dale Earnhardt Jr.	Dale Earnhardt Inc.	Chevrolet	52.585	182.105
27	90	Stephen Leicht	Robert Yates Racing	Ford	52.628	181.956
28	66	Steve Wallace	Rusty Wallace Inc.	Dodge	52.658	181.853
29	70	Justin Diercks	ML Motorsports	Chevrolet	52.665	181.829
30	7	Mike Wallace	Phoenix Racing	Chevrolet	52.673	181.801
31	22	Mike Bliss*	Fitz Racing	Dodge	52.748	181.542
32	59	Marcos Ambrose (R)	Wood Brothers/JTG Racing	Ford	52.798	181.371
33	1	J. J. Yeley	Phoenix Racing	Chevrolet	52.844	181.213
34	36	Brent Sherman	McGill Motorsports	Chevrolet	52.900	181.021
35	77	Bobby Labonte	Kevin Harvick Inc.	Chevrolet	52.900	181.021
36	88	Shane Huffman	JR Motorsports	Chevrolet	52.999	180.683
37	33	Tony Stewart	Dale Earnhardt Inc.	Chevrolet	53.111	180.302
38	28	Robert Richardson Jr.	Jay Robinson Racing	Chevrolet	53.141	180.200
39	0	Eric McClure	D.D.L. Motorsports	Chevrolet	53.450	179.158
40	01	Morgan Shepherd	D.D.L. Motorsports	Chevrolet	53.557	178.800
41	05	Justin Ashburn	Day Enterprise Racing	Chevrolet	53.803	177.983
42	52	Donnie Neuenberger	Means Racing	Ford	54.576	175.462
Official Starting grid

== Race ==
Pole sitter Brad Coleman led the first lap of the race. The first caution flew on lap 4 of the race when Jason Leffler hit the backstretch wall after getting hit from behind by Casey Mears. The race would restart on lap 8 of the race. On lap 9, Clint Bowyer tried to take the lead from Coleman but coming through the tri-oval, Bowyer tried to side draft when he made contact with Ward Burton and sent Burton spinning. Burton spun back up the track sending several other cars scattering around and spinning. Martin Truex Jr., Scott Wimmer, Marcos Ambrose, and David Reutimann all spun and crashed trying to avoid Burton bringing out the second caution of the race for the 6 car accident. The race would restart on lap 15. On the restart, David Ragan took the lead and Brad Coleman would fall very far in the back of the pack after no one else drafted behind Coleman. On lap 16, Juan Pablo Montoya took the lead. On lap 18, Casey Mears attempted to take the lead but failed to do so. On lap 19, Carl Edwards took the lead from Montoya. On lap 21, Casey Mears took the lead with a big push from Kyle Busch. On lap 23, Tony Stewart took the lead. On lap 25, Mears would take the lead back.

On lap 27, the biggest crash of the day would occur that involved one of the scariest crashes in the history of the track. Going down the backstretch, Kyle Busch attempted to slingshot his teammate Mears to take the lead on the outside. Tony Stewart went up to help Busch but Stewart hit Busch in the left rear causing Busch to turn left into the side of Mears which would spin his car around to the right. Busch's car had enough grip to flip his car upside down and hit the outside wall drivers side first upside down. Busch's car slid onto its roof all the way down to the turn 3 infield grass where the grass sent his car into violent sidewinder barrel rolls. Busch's car barrel rolled 7 times before it landed on its wheels. Busch would climb out of his car unharmed in a matter of seconds after it crashed. The force of the crash was so severe, it cracked Busch's HANS device in the process.

Some drivers pitted while others stayed out including Kasey Kahne and Kahne would lead the field back to the restart on lap 32. On lap 33, Dale Earnhardt Jr. took the lead from Kahne. On lap 34, Aric Almirola took the lead but was immeadietly passed by David Gilliland. On lap 35, Clint Bowyer took the lead. On lap 38, David Reutimann took the lead. On lap 40, Carl Edwards took the lead. On lap 43, Clint Bowyer took the lead. On lap 44, Regan Smith's hood all of a sudden came up and blocked his view. On lap 47, Casey Mears took the lead. On lap 48, Mike Wallace took the lead. On lap 48, Kevin Harvick and J. J. Yeley both made it 3 wide for the lead but both were unable to pass Wallace for the lead. On lap 52, Mike's nephew Steve Wallace attempted to take the lead but couldn't get in front of him. On lap 53, Casey Mears took the lead. On lap 56, the fourth caution flew when David Gilliland spun down the frontstretch after contact with Tony Stewart and ended up hitting the turn 1 outside wall. Casey Mears won the race off of pit road and he led the field to the restart on lap 61. On the restart, Aric Almirola attempted to take the lead but failed to do so. On lap 64, Steve Wallace took the lead but Mears would take it back on the next lap.

=== Final laps ===
With 50 laps to go, Greg Biffle took the lead. Mears took it back on the next lap. With 43 laps to go, Kevin Harvick took the lead with help from Dale Earnhardt Jr. but Junior passed Harvick and took the lead. Mears took it back on the next lap with 42 to go. With 36 to go, Juan Pablo Montoya took the lead. With 34 to go, Carl Edwards took the lead. With 33 to go, Kevin Harvick took the lead. With 32 to go, Aric Almirola took the lead. With 30 laps to go, Kevin Harvick took the lead. With 28 to go, the 5th caution would fly when Greg Biffle crashed into the outside wall in turn 3 where he would collect Jon Wood in the process. Kevin Harvick won the race off of pit road and he led the field to the restart with 23 laps to go. With 21 to go, Casey Mears took the lead. With 19 to go, Stephen Leicht attempted to take the lead but failed to get in front of Mears. Carl Edwards tried on the same lap but failed to do so. With 16 to go, the 6th caution would fly when Aric Almirola crashed in turn 4. The race would restart with 12 laps to go. With 8 laps to go, the 2nd multi car crash would occur on the backstretch taking out 7 cars. It started when Reed Sorenson pushed Steve Wallace at the wrong angle and turn Wallace down and collected Marcos Ambrose and Ambrose spun up and collected Sorenson, Kasey Kahne, Mike Bliss, Stephen Leicht, and David Reutimann. The wreck would cause a short red flag. The race would restart with 3 laps to go. But the caution would fly on the same lap for the 8th and final time for debris that came off of Kasey Kahne's car. The wreck would set up an attempt of a green-white-checkered finish. On the restart, Tony Stewart took the lead with a push from his teammate Bobby Labonte. On the last lap, Labonte stayed behind Stewart until they came through the tri-oval. Labonte pulled to Stewart's outside at just the perfect time and Labonte beat Stewart by .052 seconds and Stewart would finish in 2nd. Casey Mears, David Ragan, and Kyle Krisiloff rounded out the top 5 while Kevin Harvick, Juan Pablo Montoya, Ward Burton, Brad Coleman, and Carl Edwards rounded out the top 10.

== Race results ==
Pos	Car	Driver	Team	Manufacturer	Laps Run	Laps Led	Status	Points
1	77	Bobby Labonte	Kevin Harvick Inc.	Chevrolet	120	2	running	190
2	33	Tony Stewart	Kevin Harvick Inc.	Chevrolet	120	3	running	175
3	24	Casey Mears	Hendrick Motorsports	Chevrolet	120	52	running	175
4	6	David Ragan (R)	Roush Racing	Ford	120	1	running	165
5	14	Kyle Krisiloff (R)	Carl A. Haas Motorsports	Ford	120	0	running	155
6	21	Kevin Harvick	Richard Childress Racing	Chevrolet	120	8	running	155
7	42	Juan Pablo Montoya	Chip Ganassi Racing	Dodge	120	5	running	151
8	27	Ward Burton	Brewco Motorsports	Ford	120	0	running	142
9	18	Brad Coleman (R)	Joe Gibbs Racing	Chevrolet	120	14	running	143
10	60	Carl Edwards	Roush Racing	Ford	120	6	running	139
11	17	Danny O'Quinn Jr.	Roush Racing	Ford	120	0	running	130
12	35	Bobby Hamilton Jr.	Team Rensi Motorsports	Ford	120	1	running	132
13	2	Clint Bowyer	Richard Childress Racing	Chevrolet	120	7	running	129
14	22	Mike Bliss	Fitz Racing	Dodge	120	0	running	121
15	88	Shane Huffman	JR Motorsports	Chevrolet	120	0	running	118
16	36	Brent Sherman	McGill Motorsports	Chevrolet	120	1	running	120
17	1	J. J. Yeley	Phoenix Racing	Chevrolet	120	0	running	112
18	0	Eric McClure	D.D.L. Motorsports	Chevrolet	120	1	running	114
19	28	Robert Richardson Jr.	Jay Robinson Racing	Chevrolet	120	0	running	106
20	20	Aric Almirola	Joe Gibbs Racing	Chevrolet	120	2	running	108
21	9	Kasey Kahne	Gillett Evernham Motorsports	Dodge	119	5	running	105
22	05	Justin Ashburn	Day Enterprise Racing	Chevrolet	118	0	running	97
23	4	Regan Smith	Ginn Racing	Chevrolet	116	0	running	94
24	99	David Reutimann	Michael Waltrip Racing	Toyota	110	2	crash	96
25	59	Marcos Ambrose (R)	Wood Brothers/JTG Racing	Ford	109	0	crash	88
26	66	Steve Wallace	Rusty Wallace Inc.	Dodge	109	1	crash	90
27	41	Reed Sorenson	Chip Ganassi Racing	Dodge	109	0	crash	82
28	90	Stephen Leicht	Robert Yates Racing	Ford	109	0	crash	79
29	8	Dale Earnhardt Jr.	Dale Earnhardt Inc.	Chevrolet	94	2	transmission	81
30	16	Greg Biffle	Roush Racing	Ford	89	1	crash	78
31	47	Jon Wood	Wood Brothers/JTG Racing	Ford	89	0	crash	70
32	10	Dave Blaney	Braun Racing	Toyota	87	0	running	67
33	7	Mike Wallace	Phoenix Racing	Chevrolet	74	5	engine	69
34	29	Scott Wimmer	Richard Childress Racing	Chevrolet	71	0	running	61
35	38	Jason Leffler	Braun Racing	Toyota	71	0	running	58
36	37	Jamie McMurray	Brewco Motorsports	Ford	59	0	overheating	55
37	25	David Gilliland	Team Rensi Motorsports	Ford	55	1	crash	57
38	52	Donnie Neuenberger	Means Racing	Ford	34	0	overheating	49
39	5	Kyle Busch	Hendrick Motorsports	Chevrolet	26	0	crash	46
40	70	Justin Diercks	ML Motorsports	Chevrolet	17	0	overheating	43
41	11	Martin Truex Jr.	Dale Earnhardt Inc.	Chevrolet	9	0	crash	40
42	01	Morgan Shepherd	D.D.L. Motorsports	Chevrolet	2	0	handling	37
Official Race results

Previous race: 2007 Bashas' Supermarkets 200	NASCAR Busch Series; 2007 season	Next race: 2007 Circuit City 250
