= 2009 Aaron's 312 =

Race details
- Map of Speedway
- Date: April 25, 2009
- Official name: 2009 Aaron's 312
- Location: Talladega Superspeedway in Lincoln, Alabama
- Course: Tri-oval
- Course length: 2.66 miles (4.28 km)
- Distance: 120 laps, 319 mi (513.381 km)
- Scheduled distance: 117 laps, 311.2 mi (500.83 km)
- Weather: Sunny
- Average speed: 149.004 mph (239.799 km/h)
- Attendance: 70,000

Pole position
Driver	Ryan Newman	Kevin Harvick Inc.
- Time: 51.518

Most laps led
Driver	Kyle Busch	Joe Gibbs Racing
- Laps: 31

Winner
No. 6	David Ragan	Roush Fenway Racing

Television in the United States
- Network: ABC
- Announcers: Jerry Punch, Andy Petree, Dale Jarrett

The 2009 Aaron's 312 was a NASCAR Nationwide Series race held at Talladega Superspeedway in Lincoln, Alabama on April 25, 2009. The race was the 18th iteration of the event and the 8th race of the 2009 NASCAR Nationwide Series. Ryan Newman won the pole while Kyle Busch led the most laps. But it would be David Ragan who made a last lap pass against Newman and beat him by .030 seconds to score his first career Nationwide Series victory. But the race was most notable when Matt Kenseth flipped during the race.

== Background ==
Talladega Superspeedway, the race track where the race was held.

The track, Talladega Superspeedway, is one of six superspeedways to hold NASCAR races, the others being Daytona International Speedway, Auto Club Speedway, Indianapolis Motor Speedway, Pocono Raceway and Michigan International Speedway. The standard track at the speedway is a four-turn superspeedway that is 2.66 miles (4.28 km) long. The track's turns are banked at thirty-three degrees, while the front stretch, the location of the finish line, is banked at 16.5 degrees. The back stretch has a two-degree banking. Talladega Superspeedway can seat up to 143,231 people.

=== Entry list ===
- (R) denotes rookie driver

#	Driver	Team	Make
0	Mike Wallace	JD Motorsports	Chevrolet
01	Danny O'Quinn Jr.	JD Motorsports	Chevrolet
1	Mike Bliss	Phoenix Racing	Chevrolet
04	Mark Green	JD Motorsports	Chevrolet
05	Jeff Green	Day Enterprise Racing	Chevrolet
5	Dale Earnhardt Jr.	JR Motorsports	Chevrolet
6	David Ragan	Roush Fenway Racing	Ford
07	David Green	SK Motorsports	Toyota
09	John Wes Townley (R)	RAB Racing	Ford
10	David Reutimann	Braun Racing	Toyota
11	Scott Lagasse Jr. (R)	CJM Racing	Toyota
12	Justin Allgaier (R)	Penske Racing	Dodge
15	Michael Annett (R)	Germain Racing	Toyota
16	Matt Kenseth	Roush Fenway Racing	Ford
18	Kyle Busch	Joe Gibbs Racing	Toyota
20	Joey Logano	Joe Gibbs Racing	Toyota
23	Robert Richardson Jr.	R3 Motorsports	Chevrolet
24	Eric McClure	Rensi-Hamilton Racing	Ford
26	Brian Keselowski	Whitney Motorsports	Dodge
27	Jason Keller	Baker Curb Racing	Ford
28	Kenny Wallace	Jay Robinson Racing	Chevrolet
29	Clint Bowyer	Richard Childress Racing	Chevrolet
31	Kerry Earnhardt	Rick Ware Racing	Chevrolet
32	Brian Vickers	Braun Racing	Toyota
33	Ryan Newman	Kevin Harvick Inc.	Chevrolet
34	Tony Raines	Front Row Motorsports	Chevrolet
38	Jason Leffler	Braun Racing	Toyota
40	Scott Wimmer	Key Motorsports	Chevrolet
42	Kenny Hendrick	Smith-Ganassi Racing	Dodge
47	Michael McDowell (R)	JTG Daugherty Racing	Toyota
49	Kertus Davis	Jay Robinson Racing	Chevrolet
52	Donnie Neuenberger	Means Racing	Chevrolet
60	Carl Edwards	Roush Fenway Racing	Ford
61	Brandon Whitt	Specialty Racing	Ford
62	Brendan Gaughan (R)	Rusty Wallace Racing	Chevrolet
66	Steve Wallace	Rusty Wallace Racing	Chevrolet
70	Shelby Howard	ML Motorsports	Chevrolet
75	Bobby Gerhart	Bob Schacht Racing	Chevrolet
81	D. J. Kennington	MacDonald Motorsports	Dodge
83	Johnny Borneman III	Borneman Racing	Ford
84	Mike Harmon	Mike Harmon Racing	Chevrolet
87	Joe Nemechek	NEMCO Motorsports	Chevrolet
88	Brad Keselowski	JR Motorsports	Chevrolet
89	Morgan Shepherd	Faith Motorsports	Chevrolet
90	Johnny Chapman	MSRP Motorsports	Chevrolet
91	Justin Hobgood	MSRP Motorsports	Chevrolet
99	Michael Waltrip	Michael Waltrip Racing	Toyota
Official Entry list

== Qualifying ==
Ryan Newman won the pole for the race with a time of 51.518 and a speed of 185.877. The biggest surprise from qualifying was when ARCA series legend Bobby Gerhardt qualified in 5th driving for Bob Schacht.

Grid	No.	Driver	Team	Manufacturer	Time	Speed
1	33	Ryan Newman	Kevin Harvick Inc.	Chevrolet	51.518	185.877
2	32	Brian Vickers	Braun Racing	Toyota	51.614	185.531
3	16	Matt Kenseth	Roush Fenway Racing	Ford	51.681	185.291
4	38	Jason Leffler	Braun Racing	Toyota	51.705	185.205
5	75	Bobby Gerhart	Bob Schacht Racing	Chevrolet	51.722	185.144
6	60	Carl Edwards	Roush Fenway Racing	Ford	51.788	184.908
7	29	Clint Bowyer	Richard Childress Racing	Chevrolet	51.880	184.580
8	11	Scott Lagasse Jr. (R)	CJM Racing	Toyota	51.880	184.580
9	18	Kyle Busch	Joe Gibbs Racing	Toyota	51.893	184.534
10	88	Brad Keselowski	JR Motorsports	Chevrolet	51.914	184.459
11	81	D. J. Kennington	MacDonald Motorsports	Dodge	51.915	184.455
12	5	Dale Earnhardt Jr.	JR Motorsprots	Chevrolet	51.932	184.395
13	99	Michael Waltrip	Michael Waltrip Racing	Toyota	52.006	184.133
14	6	David Ragan	Roush Fenway Racing	Ford	52.014	184.104
15	42	Kenny Hendrick	Smith-Ganassi Racing	Dodge	52.059	183.945
16	20	Joey Logano	Joe Gibbs Racing	Toyota	52.067	183.917
17	26	Brian Keselowski	Whitney Motorsports	Dodge	52.110	183.765
18	62	Brendan Gaughan (R)	Rusty Wallace Racing	Chevrolet	52.161	183.585
19	87	Joe Nemechek	NEMCO Motorsports	Chevrolet	52.180	183.519
20	31	Kerry Earnhardt	Rick Ware Racing	Chevrolet	52.208	183.420
21	27	Jason Keller	Baker Curb Racing	Ford	52.214	183.399
22	15	Michael Annett (R)	Germain Racing	Toyota	52.216	183.392
23	34	Tony Raines	Front Row Motorsports	Chevrolet	52.255	183.255
24	10	David Reutimann	Braun Racing	Toyota	52.273	183.192
25	0	Mike Wallace	JD Motorsports	Chevrolet	52.345	182.940
26	70	Shelby Howard	ML Motorsports	Chevrolet	52.348	182.930
27	49	Kertus Davis	Jay Robinson Racing	Chevrolet	52.348	182.930
28	12	Justin Allgaier (R)	Penske Racing	Dodge	52.401	182.745
29	04	Mark Green	JD Motorsports	Chevrolet	52.408	182.720
30	28	Kenny Wallace	Jay Robinson Racing	Chevrolet	52.413	182.703
31	09	John Wes Townley (R)	RAB Racing	Ford	52.421	182.675
32	83	Johnny Borneman III	Borneman Racing	Ford	52.491	182.431
33	52	Donnie Neuenberger	Means Racing	Chevrolet	52.506	182.379
34	89	Morgan Shepherd	Faith Motorsports	Chevrolet	52.538	182.268
35	66	Steve Wallace	Rusty Wallace Racing	Chevrolet	52.617	181.994
36	24	Eric McClure	Rensi-Hamilton Racing	Ford	52.688	181.749
37	07	David Green	SK Motorsports	Toyota	52.688	181.749
38	01	Danny O'Quinn Jr.	JD Motorsports	Chevrolet	52.722	181.632
39	23	Robert Richardson Jr.	R3 Motorsports	Chevrolet	52.776	181.446
40	1	Mike Bliss	Phoenix Racing	Chevrolet	52.816	181.309
41	47	Michael McDowell (R)*	JTG Daugherty Racing	Toyota	53.079	180.410
42	61	Brandon Whitt*	Specialty Racing	Ford	53.107	180.315
43	05	Jeff Green**	Day Enterprise Racing	Chevrolet	52.941	180.881
Failed to qualify, withdrew, or driver changes
44	90	Johnny Chapman	MSRP Motorsports	Chevrolet	52.590	182.088
45	91	Justin Hobgood	MSRP Motorsports	Chevrolet	52.772	181.460
46	40	Scott Wimmer	Key Motorsports	Chevrolet	52.981	180.744
47	84	Mike Harmon	Mike Harmon Racing	Chevrolet	54.138	176.881
Official Starting grid

* - Made the field via owners points.

** - Made the field via past champions provisional.

== Race ==
Outside pole sitter Brian Vickers took the lead from pole sitter Ryan Newman and Vickers led the first lap. On lap 2, rookie Scott Lagasse Jr. took the lead from Vickers. On lap 4, Dale Earnhardt Jr. attempted to take the lead from Lagasse and led that lap but could not get in front of him. On lap 7, Carl Edwards took the lead from Lagasse. On lap 17, another rookie in Justin Allgaier took the lead but was immeadietly passed by Michael Waltrip and Waltrip took the lead. On lap 18, Carl Edwards retook the lead from Waltrip. On lap 24, Joey Logano took the lead from Edwards. On lap 25, Ryan Newman took the lead from Logano. On lap 29, Carl Edwards took the lead back. Soon by lap 32, it began to be a lead changing frenzy for the next 5 laps. Dale Earnhardt Jr. took the lead on lap 32, Ryan Newman took the lead on lap 33, Kyle Busch took the lead on lap 34, Carl Edwards took the lead on lap 35, and Brian Vickers took the lead on lap 36 but was passed by Michael Waltrip on the same lap and Waltrip led lap 36 before he was passed by both Steve Wallace and Michael McDowell and both Wallace and McDowell battled for the lead on lap 37. But McDowell left the inside open for Dale Earnhardt Jr. and Junior passed McDowell and Junior would pass Wallace and take the lead. On lap 39, green flag pitstops began. On the next lap, Dale Earnhardt Jr. went to pit handing the lead to Brad Keselowski. Unfortunately, for Junior, he missed his pit box and had to come back the next lap to pit. Keselowski pitted on lap 41 giving the lead to Morgan Shepherd. Shepherd pitted on lap 43 giving the lead to David Ragan. Ragan did not lead a lap and went to pit which gave the lead to Matt Kenseth after everything had cycled through. On lap 47, Kyle Busch took the lead. On lap 48, Clint Bowyer took the lead from Busch. Busch would take it back on lap 50. On lap 51, Brian Vickers took the lead from Busch. On lap 52, Kyle Busch took the lead back from Vickers. On lap 54, the first caution would fly for a three car accident down the backstretch. It started when Joey Logano was pushing the lapped car of Michael Waltrip when Logano hit Waltrip at the wrong angle turning Waltrip around. Waltrip spun down and collected Clint Bowyer and the two hit the inside wall on the backstretch.

=== Final laps ===
Kyle Busch won the race off of pit road and he led the field to the restart on lap 59. With 43 laps to go on lap 75, Brad Keselowski took the lead with help from his car owner Dale Earnhardt Jr. With 31 laps to go, the 2nd caution would fly for debris. At the same time, Danny O'Quinn Jr's engine blew. Brad Keselowski won the race off of pit road and he led the field to the restart with 25 laps to go. With 24 to go, Kyle Busch took the lead from Keselowski. With 23 to go, the third caution would fly when Brandon Whitt crashed in turn 2. The race restarted with 19 laps to go. With 18 to go, Dale Earnhardt Jr. took the lead from Busch. With 17 to go, Jason Leffler and Brian Vickers attempted to take the lead from Junior but failed. With 15 to go, Matt Kenseth took the lead. With 14 to go, Ryan Newman took the lead from Kenseth. With 13 to go, the 4th caution would fly for it being the biggest crash of the day. It started when David Ragan bumped Matt Kenseth too hard down the backstretch and it caused Kenseth's car to go right and into Kyle Busch. Kenseth overcorrected back to the left and cranked it back to the right so hard it spun at an over 100-degree angle and ended up tipping over and started tumbling down the backstretch into turn 3. The car tumbled 3 times before the car landed on its roof on the inside of turn 3 and started scraping on its roof down the banking before it hit the infield grass which brought his car back onto all four wheels on fire. Kenseth was able to climb out of car unharmed in a matter of seconds after the accident. The race would restart with 9 laps to go with Newman leading. With 8 to go, the 5th caution would fly when Steve Wallace blew a right front tire and hit the outside wall in turn 2. The race would restart with 5 laps to go with Newman continuing to lead. Newman was looking for his first Nationwide Series win since 2005 and his first at Talladega win in his first start at Talladega in the Nationwide Series. But with 3 laps to go, the 6th and final caution would fly for a 3 car crash down the backstretch. It started when Kyle Busch bumped Justin Allgaier at the wrong angle and turned Allgaier down into Bobby Gerhart and both Allgaier and Gerhart crashed into the inside wall. The wreck would set up three attempts of a green-white-checkered. On the restart, Newman stayed in front with Dale Earnhardt Jr. pushing him. On the last lap, Brad Keselowski tried to get something going with the outside line but fell back. Out of turn 4, Junior attempted to pass Newman on the outside but Newman came up into Junior and both cars made contact which opened the bottom lane for Tony Raines and Raines tried to take the lead. Newman blocked Raines and David Ragan came up to the outside of Newman with a push from Joey Logano. The two dragged race to the finish line through the tri-oval. Ragan beat Newman to the line by .030 seconds to take home the win and Newman would finish in 2nd. The win would be Ragan's first win of his Nationwide Series career. Joey Logano, Tony Raines, and Dale Earnhardt Jr. rounded out the top 5 while Jason Leffler, Jason Keller, Scott Lagasse Jr., Brad Keselowski, and Kyle Busch rounded out the top 10.

== Race results ==
Pos	Car	Driver	Team	Manufacturer	Laps Run	Laps Led	Status	Points
1	6	David Ragan	Roush Fenway Racing	Ford	120	1	running	190
2	33	Ryan Newman	Kevin Harvick Inc.	Chevrolet	120	21	running	175
3	20	Joey Logano	Joe Gibbs Racing	Toyota	120	1	running	170
4	34	Tony Raines	Front Row Motorsports	Chevrolet	120	0	running	160
5	5	Dale Earnhardt Jr.	JR Motorsports	Chevrolet	120	8	running	160
6	38	Jason Leffler	Braun Racing	Toyota	120	0	running	150
7	27	Jason Keller	Baker Curb Racing	Ford	120	0	running	146
8	11	Scott Lagasse Jr. (R)	CJM Racing	Toyota	120	4	running	147
9	88	Brad Keselowski	JR Motorsports	Chevrolet	120	19	running	143
10	18	Kyle Busch	Joe Gibbs Racing	Toyota	120	31	running	144
11	87	Joe Nemechek	NEMCO Motorsports	Chevrolet	120	0	running	130
12	31	Kerry Earnhardt	Rick Ware Racing	Chevrolet	120	0	running	127
13	60	Carl Edwards	Roush Fenway Racing	Ford	120	20	running	129
14	26	Brian Keselowski	Whitney Motorsports	Dodge	120	1	running	126
15	47	Michael McDowell (R)	JTG Daugherty Racing	Toyota	120	0	running	118
16	23	Robert Richardson Jr.	R3 Motorsports	Chevrolet	120	0	running	115
17	28	Kenny Wallace	Jay Robinson Racing	Chevrolet	120	0	running	112
18	09	John Wes Townley (R)	RAB Racing	Ford	120	0	running	109
19	81	D. J. Kennington	MacDonald Motorsports	Dodge	120	0	running	106
20	32	Brian Vickers	Braun Racing	Toyota	120	2	running	108
21	15	Michael Annett (R)	Germain Racing	Toyota	120	0	running	100
22	49	Kertus Davis	Jay Robinson Racing	Toyota	120	0	running	97
23	89	Morgan Shepherd	Faith Motorsports	Chevrolet	120	3	running	99
24	07	David Green	SK Motorsports	Toyota	120	0	running	91
25	24	Eric McClure	Rensi-Hamilton Racing	Ford	120	0	running	88
26	83	Johnny Borneman III	Borneman Racing	Ford	120	0	running	85
27	70	Shelby Howard	ML Motorsports	Chevrolet	120	0	running	82
28	52	Donnie Neuenberger	Means Racing	Chevrolet	119	0	running	79
29	10	David Reutimann	Braun Racing	Toyota	118	0	running	76
30	61	Brandon Whitt	Specialty Racing	Ford	118	0	running	73
31	29	Clint Bowyer	Richard Childress Racing	Chevrolet	117	2	running	75
32	12	Justin Allgaier (R)	Penske Racing	Dodge	114	0	crash	67
33	75	Bobby Gerhart	Bob Schacht Racing	Chevrolet	114	0	crash	64
34	66	Steve Wallace	Rusty Wallace Racing	Chevrolet	109	0	suspension	61
35	16	Matt Kenseth	Roush Fenway Racing	Ford	104	4	crash	63
36	05	Jeff Green	Day Enterprise Racing	Chevrolet	104	0	running	55
37	01	Danny O'Quinn Jr.	JD Motorsports	Chevrolet	86	0	engine	52
38	62	Brendan Gaughan	Rusty Wallace Racing	Chevrolet	73	0	overheating	49
39	0	Mike Wallace	JD Motorsports	Chevrolet	58	1	engine	51
40	99	Michael Waltrip	Michael Waltrip Racing	Toyota	52	2	crash	48
41	1	Mike Bliss	Phoenix Racing	Chevrolet	41	0	overheating	40
42	42	Kenny Hendrick	Smith-Ganassi Racing	Dodge	19	0	overheating	37
43	04	Mark Green	JD Motorsports	Chevrolet	2	0	vibration	34
Official Race results

Previous race: 2009 Bashas' Supermarkets 200	NASCAR Nationwide Series; 2009 season	Next race: 2009 Lipton Tea 250
