= 2024 Bluegreen Vacations Duels =

NASCAR Bluegreen Vacations Duels

Race details
- Date: February 15, 2024
- Location: Daytona International Speedway; Daytona Beach, Florida
- Course: Permanent racing facility 2.5 mi (4 km)
- Distance: Race 1: 60 laps, 150 mi (240 km); Race 2: 60 laps, 150 mi (240 km)
- Avg Speed: Race 1: 167.963 miles per hour (270.310 km/h); Race 2: 161.146 miles per hour (259.339 km/h)

Race 1
- Pole position: Joey Logano
- Most laps led: Kyle Larson (20)
- Winner: Tyler Reddick

Race 2
- Pole position: Michael McDowell
- Most laps led: Bubba Wallace (21)
- Winner: Christopher Bell

Television
- Network: FS1 & MRN
- Announcers: Mike Joy, Clint Bowyer, and Kevin Harvick (Television); Alex Hayden, Jeff Striegle, and Rusty Wallace (Booth); Dave Moody (1 & 2), Mike Bagley (Backstretch), and Dillon Welch (3 & 4) (Turns) (Radio)

The 2024 Bluegreen Vacations Duels were a pair of NASCAR Cup Series stock car races held on February 15, 2024, at Daytona International Speedway in Daytona Beach, Florida. Both were contested over 60 laps, they were the qualifying races for the 2024 Daytona 500.

== Report ==
=== Background ===
Daytona International Speedway, where the races were held.

Daytona International Speedway is one of five superspeedways to hold NASCAR races, the others being Michigan International Speedway, Indianapolis Motor Speedway, Pocono Raceway and Talladega Superspeedway. The standard track at Daytona International Speedway is a four–turn superspeedway that is 2.5-mile (4.0 km) long. The track's turns are banked at 31 degrees, while the front stretch, the location of the finish line, is banked at 18 degrees.

== Qualifying ==
Joey Logano scored the pole for the race with a time of 49.465 and a speed of 181.947 mph (292.815 km/h).

=== Qualifying results ===
Pos	No.	Driver	Team	Manufacturer	R1	R2
1	22	Joey Logano	Team Penske	Ford	49.641	49.465
2	34	Michael McDowell	Front Row Motorsports	Ford	49.783	49.536
3	5	Kyle Larson	Hendrick Motorsports	Chevrolet	49.730	49.550
4	2	Austin Cindric	Team Penske	Ford	49.799	49.667
5	9	Chase Elliott	Hendrick Motorsports	Chevrolet	49.782	49.675
6	24	William Byron	Hendrick Motorsports	Chevrolet	49.776	49.676
7	3	Austin Dillon	Richard Childress Racing	Chevrolet	49.745	49.705
8	8	Kyle Busch	Richard Childress Racing	Chevrolet	49.824	49.725
9	1	Ross Chastain	Trackhouse Racing	Chevrolet	49.837	49.756
10	21	Harrison Burton	Wood Brothers Racing	Ford	49.903	49.909
11	38	Todd Gilliland	Front Row Motorsports	Ford	49.906	—
12	15	Riley Herbst (i)	Rick Ware Racing	Ford	49.946	—
13	41	Ryan Preece	Stewart–Haas Racing	Ford	49.952	—
14	14	Chase Briscoe	Stewart–Haas Racing	Ford	49.966	—
15	17	Chris Buescher	RFK Racing	Ford	49.978	—
16	10	Noah Gragson	Stewart–Haas Racing	Ford	49.979	—
17	48	Alex Bowman	Hendrick Motorsports	Chevrolet	49.996	—
18	12	Ryan Blaney	Team Penske	Ford	50.003	—
19	99	Daniel Suárez	Trackhouse Racing	Chevrolet	50.058	—
20	62	Anthony Alfredo (i)	Beard Motorsports	Chevrolet	50.098	—
21	16	A. J. Allmendinger (i)	Kaulig Racing	Chevrolet	50.101	—
22	43	Erik Jones	Legacy Motor Club	Toyota	50.101	—
23	4	Josh Berry (R)	Stewart–Haas Racing	Ford	50.102	—
24	31	Daniel Hemric	Kaulig Racing	Chevrolet	50.133	—
25	6	Brad Keselowski	RFK Racing	Ford	50.170	—
26	19	Martin Truex Jr.	Joe Gibbs Racing	Toyota	50.177	—
27	60	David Ragan	RFK Racing	Ford	50.200	—
28	23	Bubba Wallace	23XI Racing	Toyota	50.208	—
29	54	Ty Gibbs	Joe Gibbs Racing	Toyota	50.220	—
30	51	Justin Haley	Rick Ware Racing	Ford	50.226	—
31	47	Ricky Stenhouse Jr.	JTG Daugherty Racing	Chevrolet	50.231	—
32	20	Christopher Bell	Joe Gibbs Racing	Toyota	50.251	—
33	7	Corey LaJoie	Spire Motorsports	Chevrolet	50.261	—
34	11	Denny Hamlin	Joe Gibbs Racing	Toyota	50.293	—
35	84	Jimmie Johnson	Legacy Motor Club	Toyota	50.323	—
36	45	Tyler Reddick	23XI Racing	Toyota	50.334	—
37	71	Zane Smith (R)	Spire Motorsports	Chevrolet	50.485	—
38	77	Carson Hocevar (R)	Spire Motorsports	Chevrolet	50.589	—
39	42	John Hunter Nemechek	Legacy Motor Club	Toyota	50.608	—
40	78	B. J. McLeod (i)	Live Fast Motorsports	Chevrolet	50.749	—
41	44	J. J. Yeley (i)	NY Racing Team	Chevrolet	51.261	—
42	36	Kaz Grala (R)	Front Row Motorsports	Ford	0.000	—
Official qualifying results

== Duels ==
=== Duel 1 ===
==== Duel 1 results ====
Pos	Grid	No	Driver	Team	Manufacturer	Laps	Points
1	19	45	Tyler Reddick	23XI Racing	Toyota	60	10
2	3	9	Chase Elliott	Hendrick Motorsports	Chevrolet	60	9
3	9	48	Alex Bowman	Hendrick Motorsports	Chevrolet	60	8
4	20	77	Carson Hocevar (R)	Spire Motorsports	Chevrolet	60	7
5	12	43	Erik Jones	Legacy Motor Club	Toyota	60	6
6	10	99	Daniel Suárez	Trackhouse Racing	Chevrolet	60	5
7	1	22	Joey Logano	Team Penske	Ford	60	4
8	15	54	Ty Gibbs	Joe Gibbs Racing	Toyota	60	3
9	2	5	Kyle Larson	Hendrick Motorsports	Chevrolet	60	2
10	8	17	Chris Buescher	RFK Racing	Ford	60	1
11	5	1	Ross Chastain	Trackhouse Racing	Chevrolet	60	0
12	18	84	Jimmie Johnson	Legacy Motor Club	Toyota	60	0
13	7	41	Ryan Preece	Stewart–Haas Racing	Ford	60	0
14	14	19	Martin Truex Jr.	Joe Gibbs Racing	Toyota	60	0
15	17	7	Corey LaJoie	Spire Motorsports	Chevrolet	60	0
16	21	44	J. J. Yeley (i)	NY Racing Team	Chevrolet	60	0
17	6	38	Todd Gilliland	Front Row Motorsports	Ford	60	0
18	4	3	Austin Dillon	Richard Childress Racing	Chevrolet	60	0
19	11	62	Anthony Alfredo (i)	Beard Motorsports	Chevrolet	59	0
20	16	47	Ricky Stenhouse Jr.	JTG Daugherty Racing	Chevrolet	51	0
21	13	31	Daniel Hemric	Kaulig Racing	Chevrolet	49	0
Official race results

=== Duel 2 ===
==== Duel 2 results ====
Pos	Grid	No	Driver	Team	Manufacturer	Laps	Points
1	16	20	Christopher Bell	Joe Gibbs Racing	Toyota	60	10
2	2	2	Austin Cindric	Team Penske	Ford	60	9
3	17	11	Denny Hamlin	Joe Gibbs Racing	Toyota	60	8
4	19	42	John Hunter Nemechek	Legacy Motor Club	Toyota	60	7
5	5	21	Harrison Burton	Wood Brothers Racing	Ford	60	6
6	18	71	Zane Smith (R)	Spire Motorsports	Chevrolet	60	5
7	12	6	Brad Keselowski	RFK Racing	Ford	60	4
8	3	24	William Byron	Hendrick Motorsports	Chevrolet	60	3
9	7	14	Chase Briscoe	Stewart–Haas Racing	Ford	60	2
10	15	51	Justin Haley	Rick Ware Racing	Ford	60	1
11	14	23	Bubba Wallace	23XI Racing	Toyota	60	0
12	21	36	Kaz Grala (R)	Front Row Motorsports	Ford	60	0
13	10	16	A. J. Allmendinger (i)	Kaulig Racing	Chevrolet	60	0
14	20	78	B. J. McLeod (i)	Live Fast Motorsports	Chevrolet	60	0
15	13	60	David Ragan	RFK Racing	Ford	60	0
16	1	34	Michael McDowell	Front Row Motorsports	Ford	60	0
17	11	4	Josh Berry (R)	Stewart–Haas Racing	Ford	48	0
18	9	12	Ryan Blaney	Team Penske	Ford	47	0
19	4	8	Kyle Busch	Richard Childress Racing	Chevrolet	47	0
20	6	15	Riley Herbst (i)	Rick Ware Racing	Ford	47	0
21	8	10	Noah Gragson	Stewart–Haas Racing	Ford	47	0
Official race results

== Media ==
=== Television ===
FS1
Booth announcers	Pit reporters	In-race analyst
Lap-by-lap: Mike Joy; Color-commentator: Clint Bowyer; Color-commentator: Kevin Harvick	Jamie Little; Regan Smith; Josh Sims	Larry McReynolds

=== Radio ===
MRN Radio
Booth announcers	Turn announcers	Pit reporters
Lead announcer: Alex Hayden; Announcer: Jeff Striegle; Announcer: Rusty Wallace	Turns 1 & 2: Dave Moody; Backstretch: Mike Bagley; Turns 3 & 4: Dillon Welch	Steve Post; Kim Coon; Jason Toy; Brienne Pedigo
