= 2018 Gander Outdoors 400 (Dover) =

Race details
- Race 30 of 36 in the 2018 Monster Energy NASCAR Cup Series
- Date: October 7, 2018
- Location: Dover International Speedway in Dover, Delaware
- Course: Permanent racing facility
- Course length: 1 miles (1.609 km)
- Distance: 404 laps, 404 mi (650.175 km)
- Scheduled distance: 400 laps, 400 mi (643.738 km)
- Average speed: 122.404 miles per hour (196.990 km/h)

Pole position
Driver	Kyle Busch	Joe Gibbs Racing

Most laps led
Driver	Kevin Harvick	Stewart–Haas Racing
- Laps: 286

Winner
No. 9	Chase Elliott	Hendrick Motorsports

Television in the United States
- Network: NBCSN
- Announcers: Rick Allen, Jeff Burton, Steve Letarte and Dale Earnhardt Jr.
- Nielsen ratings: 1.2/1.3 (Overnight)

Radio in the United States
- Radio: MRN
- Booth announcers: Joe Moore, Jeff Striegle and Rusty Wallace
- Turn announcers: Mike Bagley (Backstretch)

The 2018 Gander Outdoors 400 was a Monster Energy NASCAR Cup Series race held on October 7, 2018 at Dover International Speedway in Dover, Delaware. Contested over 404 laps – extended from 400 laps due to an overtime finish – on the 1-mile (1.6-kilometre) concrete speedway, it was the 30th race of the 2018 Monster Energy NASCAR Cup Series season, fourth race of the Playoffs, and the first race of the Round of 12.

Hendrick Motorsports driver Chase Elliott took his 2nd win of the season, taking the race lead when Stewart–Haas Racing's Aric Almirola pitted with 6 laps to go, and maintained the lead through the overtime finish to advance to the Round of 8.

== Report ==
=== Background ===
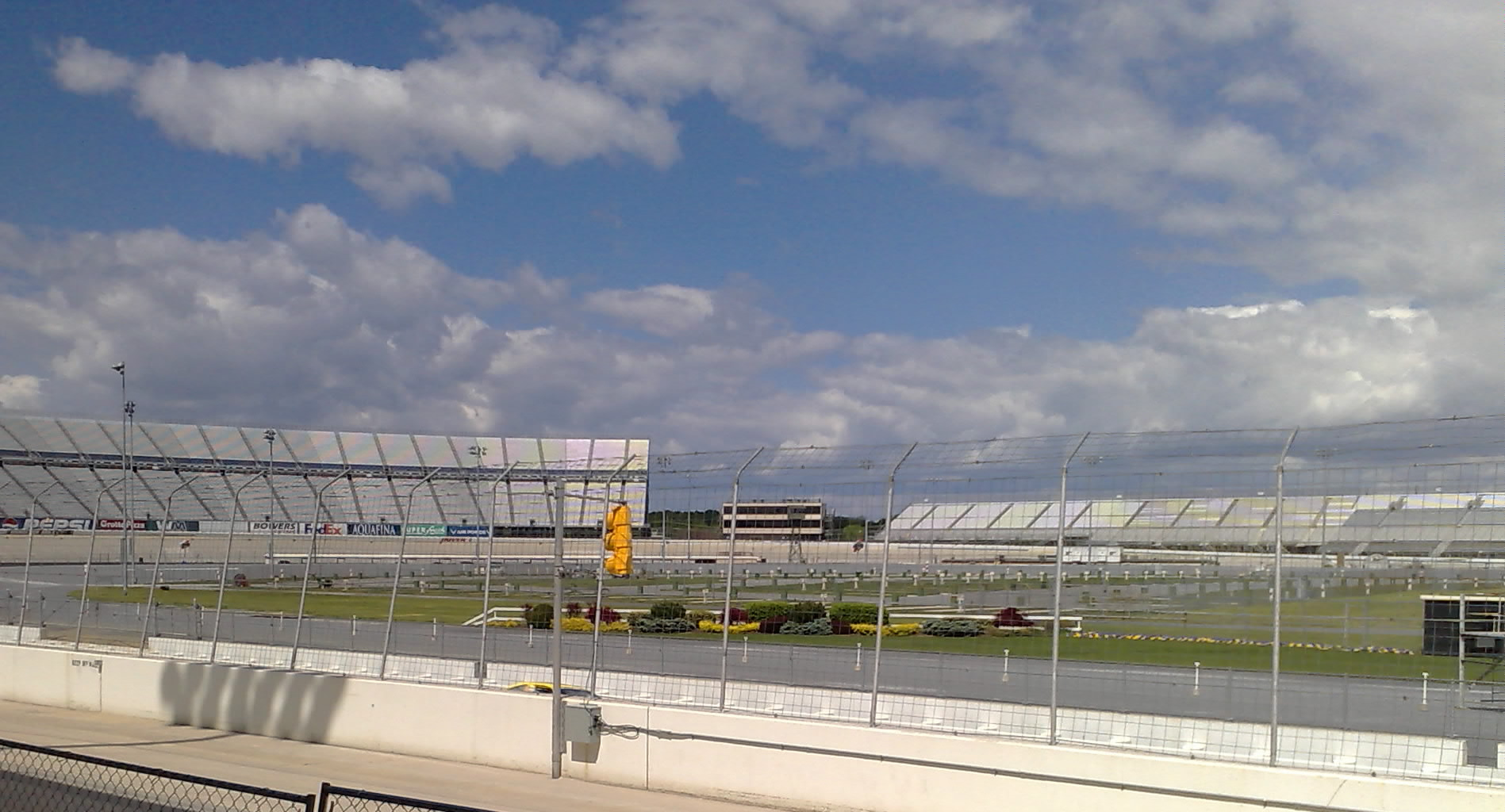
Dover International Speedway, the track where the race was held.

Dover International Speedway (formerly Dover Downs International Speedway) is a race track in Dover, Delaware, United States. Since opening in 1969, it has held at least one NASCAR race a season. In addition to NASCAR, the track also hosted USAC and the Verizon IndyCar Series. The track features one layout, a 1-mile (1.6-kilometre) concrete oval, with 24° banking in the turns and 9° banking on the straights. The speedway is owned and operated by Dover Motorsports.

The track, nicknamed "The Monster Mile", was built in 1969 by Melvin Joseph of Melvin L. Joseph Construction Company, Inc., with an asphalt surface, but was replaced with concrete in 1995. Six years later in 2001, the track's capacity moved to 135,000 seats, making the track have the largest capacity of sports venue in the mid-Atlantic. In 2002, the name changed to Dover International Speedway from Dover Downs International Speedway after Dover Downs Gaming and Entertainment split, making Dover Motorsports. From 2007 to 2009, the speedway worked on an improvement project called "The Monster Makeover", which expanded facilities at the track and beautified the track. After the 2014 season, the track's capacity was reduced to 95,500 seats.

==== Entry list ====
No.	Driver	Team	Manufacturer
00	Landon Cassill (i)	StarCom Racing	Chevrolet
1	Jamie McMurray	Chip Ganassi Racing	Chevrolet
2	Brad Keselowski	Team Penske	Ford
3	Austin Dillon	Richard Childress Racing	Chevrolet
4	Kevin Harvick	Stewart–Haas Racing	Ford
6	Matt Kenseth	Roush Fenway Racing	Ford
9	Chase Elliott	Hendrick Motorsports	Chevrolet
10	Aric Almirola	Stewart–Haas Racing	Ford
11	Denny Hamlin	Joe Gibbs Racing	Toyota
12	Ryan Blaney	Team Penske	Ford
13	Ty Dillon	Germain Racing	Chevrolet
14	Clint Bowyer	Stewart–Haas Racing	Ford
15	Ross Chastain (i)	Premium Motorsports	Chevrolet
17	Ricky Stenhouse Jr.	Roush Fenway Racing	Ford
18	Kyle Busch	Joe Gibbs Racing	Toyota
19	Daniel Suárez	Joe Gibbs Racing	Toyota
20	Erik Jones	Joe Gibbs Racing	Toyota
21	Paul Menard	Wood Brothers Racing	Ford
22	Joey Logano	Team Penske	Ford
23	J. J. Yeley (i)	BK Racing	Toyota
24	William Byron (R)	Hendrick Motorsports	Chevrolet
31	Ryan Newman	Richard Childress Racing	Chevrolet
32	Matt DiBenedetto	Go Fas Racing	Ford
34	Michael McDowell	Front Row Motorsports	Ford
37	Chris Buescher	JTG Daugherty Racing	Chevrolet
38	David Ragan	Front Row Motorsports	Ford
41	Kurt Busch	Stewart–Haas Racing	Ford
42	Kyle Larson	Chip Ganassi Racing	Chevrolet
43	Bubba Wallace (R)	Richard Petty Motorsports	Chevrolet
47	A. J. Allmendinger	JTG Daugherty Racing	Chevrolet
48	Jimmie Johnson	Hendrick Motorsports	Chevrolet
51	B. J. McLeod (i)	Rick Ware Racing	Ford
52	Harrison Rhodes	Rick Ware Racing	Chevrolet
66	Timmy Hill (i)	MBM Motorsports	Toyota
72	Corey LaJoie	TriStar Motorsports	Chevrolet
78	Martin Truex Jr.	Furniture Row Racing	Toyota
88	Alex Bowman	Hendrick Motorsports	Chevrolet
95	Regan Smith	Leavine Family Racing	Chevrolet
96	Jeffrey Earnhardt	Gaunt Brothers Racing	Toyota
Official entry list

== First practice ==
Kyle Larson was the fastest in the first practice session with a time of 21.892 seconds and a speed of 164.444 mph (264.647 km/h).

Pos	No.	Driver	Team	Manufacturer	Time	Speed
1	42	Kyle Larson	Chip Ganassi Racing	Chevrolet	21.892	164.444
2	4	Kevin Harvick	Stewart–Haas Racing	Ford	22.025	163.451
3	41	Kurt Busch	Stewart–Haas Racing	Ford	22.037	163.362
Official first practice results

== Qualifying ==
Qualifying on Friday was cancelled due to rain and Kyle Busch, the point leader, was awarded the pole as a result.

=== Starting lineup ===
Pos	No.	Driver	Team	Manufacturer
1	18	Kyle Busch	Joe Gibbs Racing	Toyota
2	4	Kevin Harvick	Stewart–Haas Racing	Ford
3	78	Martin Truex Jr.	Furniture Row Racing	Toyota
4	2	Brad Keselowski	Team Penske	Ford
5	14	Clint Bowyer	Stewart–Haas Racing	Ford
6	22	Joey Logano	Team Penske	Ford
7	41	Kurt Busch	Stewart–Haas Racing	Ford
8	12	Ryan Blaney	Team Penske	Ford
9	9	Chase Elliott	Hendrick Motorsports	Chevrolet
10	42	Kyle Larson	Chip Ganassi Racing	Chevrolet
11	10	Aric Almirola	Stewart–Haas Racing	Ford
12	88	Alex Bowman	Hendrick Motorsports	Chevrolet
13	48	Jimmie Johnson	Hendrick Motorsports	Chevrolet
14	3	Austin Dillon	Richard Childress Racing	Chevrolet
15	11	Denny Hamlin	Joe Gibbs Racing	Toyota
16	20	Erik Jones	Joe Gibbs Racing	Toyota
17	31	Ryan Newman	Richard Childress Racing	Chevrolet
18	21	Paul Menard	Wood Brothers Racing	Ford
19	19	Daniel Suárez	Joe Gibbs Racing	Toyota
20	1	Jamie McMurray	Chip Ganassi Racing	Chevrolet
21	17	Ricky Stenhouse Jr.	Roush Fenway Racing	Ford
22	24	William Byron (R)	Hendrick Motorsports	Chevrolet
23	37	Chris Buescher	JTG Daugherty Racing	Chevrolet
24	47	A. J. Allmendinger	JTG Daugherty Racing	Chevrolet
25	95	Regan Smith	Leavine Family Racing	Chevrolet
26	38	David Ragan	Front Row Motorsports	Ford
27	34	Michael McDowell	Front Row Motorsports	Ford
28	6	Matt Kenseth	Roush Fenway Racing	Ford
29	43	Bubba Wallace (R)	Richard Petty Motorsports	Chevrolet
30	13	Ty Dillon	Germain Racing	Chevrolet
31	32	Matt DiBenedetto	Go Fas Racing	Ford
32	15	Ross Chastain (i)	Premium Motorsports	Chevrolet
33	72	Corey LaJoie	Tri-Star Motorsports	Chevrolet
34	00	Landon Cassill (i)	StarCom Racing	Chevrolet
35	23	J. J. Yeley (i)	BK Racing	Toyota
36	51	B. J. McLeod (i)	Rick Ware Racing	Ford
37	96	Jeffrey Earnhardt	Gaunt Brothers Racing	Toyota
38	66	Timmy Hill (i)	MBM Motorsports	Toyota
39	52	Harrison Rhodes	Rick Ware Racing	Chevrolet
Official starting lineup

== Practice (post-qualifying) ==
=== Second practice ===
Second practice session scheduled for Saturday was cancelled due to rain.

=== Final practice ===
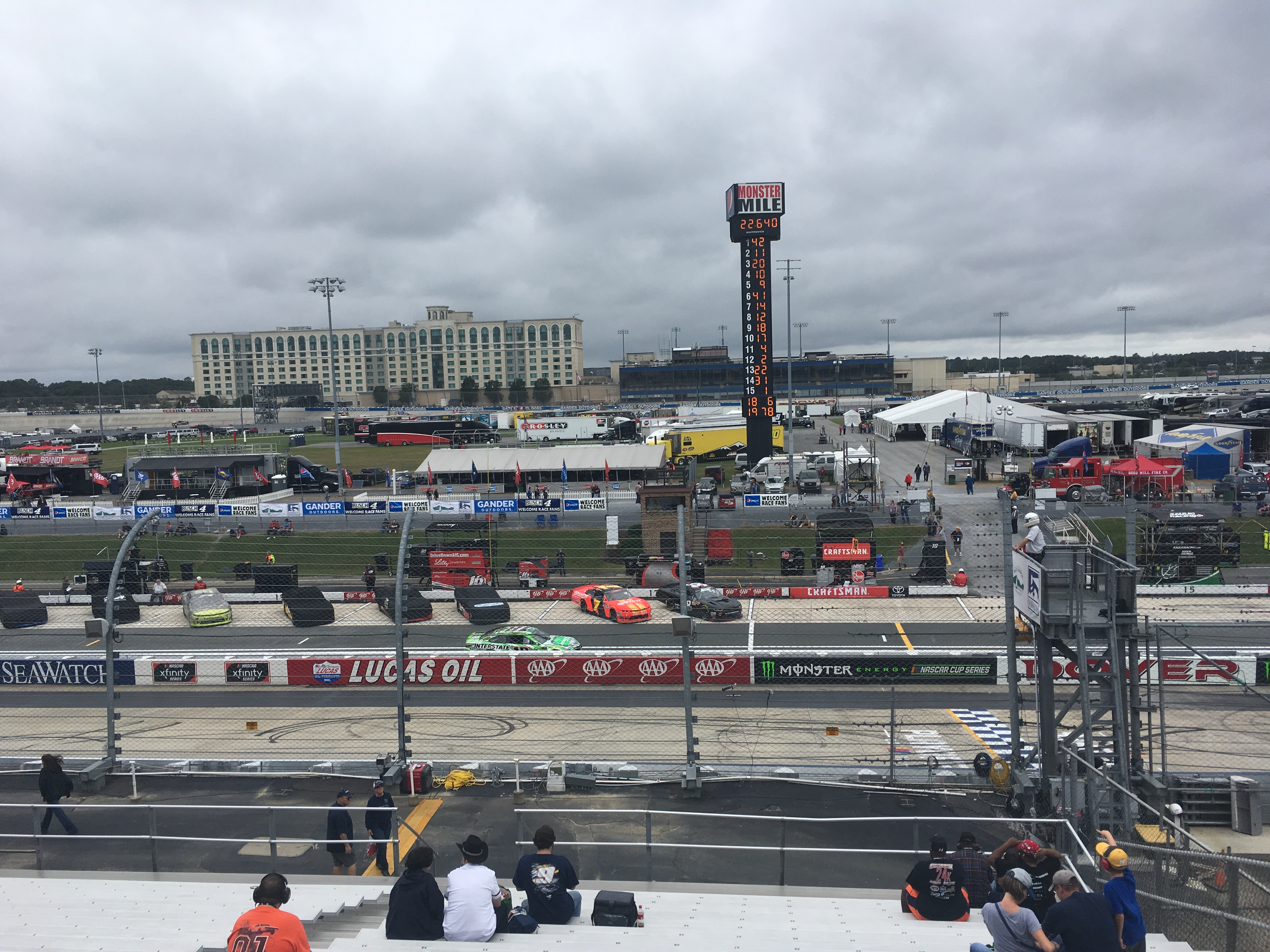
Final practice

Kyle Larson was the fastest in the final practice session with a time of 22.640 seconds and a speed of 159.011 mph (255.903 km/h).

Pos	No.	Driver	Team	Manufacturer	Time	Speed
1	42	Kyle Larson	Chip Ganassi Racing	Chevrolet	22.640	159.011
2	11	Denny Hamlin	Joe Gibbs Racing	Toyota	22.880	157.343
3	20	Erik Jones	Joe Gibbs Racing	Toyota	22.916	157.095
Official final practice results

== Race ==
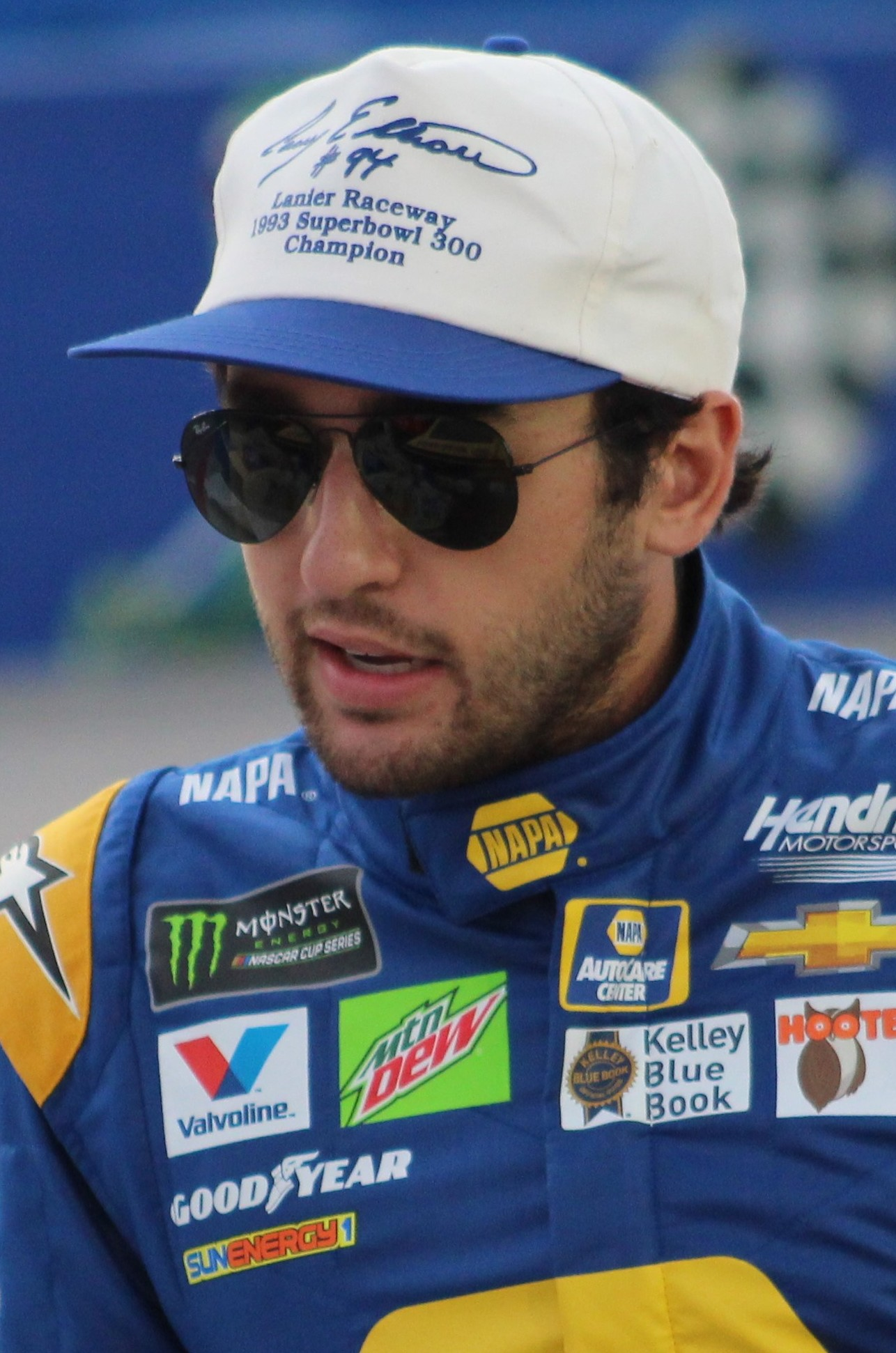
Chase Elliott won the race.

Kyle Busch led the field to green, and led the opening 15 laps of the race before being passed by Kevin Harvick. Harvick then led the majority of the race, leading a total of 286 laps and won both stages. Having ceded the lead to Busch on lap 321, Harvick dropped further back when he suffered a loose wheel, but he was able to work back up to a sixth-placed finish from a lap down. Aric Almirola took the lead from Busch on lap 323, and despite losing the lead to Brad Keselowski during the pit cycle at the third caution (for debris), Almirola regained the lead on the restart on lap 349. He led the race until the final ten laps, when Clint Bowyer crashed to cause the fourth caution, and Almirola pitted. Chase Elliott assumed the lead, as one of three drivers that did not pit, along with Martin Truex Jr. and Keselowski. On the restart, Elliott cleared Keselowski, who ultimately collided with Almirola, while Ryan Blaney, Truex Jr. and Alex Bowman were also involved, and the race went to a green–white–checkered finish. With a bump from Erik Jones, Elliott pulled clear on the restart and ultimately closed out the race for his 2nd win of the season to advance to the Round of 8.

=== Stage results ===
Stage 1 Laps: 120

Pos	No	Driver	Team	Manufacturer	Points
1	4	Kevin Harvick	Stewart–Haas Racing	Ford	10
2	22	Joey Logano	Team Penske	Ford	9
3	18	Kyle Busch	Joe Gibbs Racing	Toyota	8
4	14	Clint Bowyer	Stewart–Haas Racing	Ford	7
5	9	Chase Elliott	Hendrick Motorsports	Chevrolet	6
6	2	Brad Keselowski	Team Penske	Ford	5
7	12	Ryan Blaney	Team Penske	Ford	4
8	41	Kurt Busch	Stewart–Haas Racing	Ford	3
9	10	Aric Almirola	Stewart–Haas Racing	Ford	2
10	78	Martin Truex Jr.	Furniture Row Racing	Toyota	1
Official stage one results

Stage 2 Laps: 120

Pos	No	Driver	Team	Manufacturer	Points
1	4	Kevin Harvick	Stewart–Haas Racing	Ford	10
2	14	Clint Bowyer	Stewart–Haas Racing	Ford	9
3	78	Martin Truex Jr.	Furniture Row Racing	Toyota	8
4	22	Joey Logano	Team Penske	Ford	7
5	10	Aric Almirola	Stewart–Haas Racing	Ford	6
6	41	Kurt Busch	Stewart–Haas Racing	Ford	5
7	18	Kyle Busch	Joe Gibbs Racing	Toyota	4
8	11	Denny Hamlin	Joe Gibbs Racing	Toyota	3
9	9	Chase Elliott	Hendrick Motorsports	Chevrolet	2
10	2	Brad Keselowski	Team Penske	Ford	1
Official stage two results

=== Final stage results ===
Stage 3 Laps: 160

Pos	Grid	No	Driver	Team	Manufacturer	Laps	Points
1	9	9	Chase Elliott	Hendrick Motorsports	Chevrolet	404	48
2	15	11	Denny Hamlin	Joe Gibbs Racing	Toyota	404	38
3	6	22	Joey Logano	Team Penske	Ford	404	50
4	16	20	Erik Jones	Joe Gibbs Racing	Toyota	404	33
5	7	41	Kurt Busch	Stewart–Haas Racing	Ford	404	40
6	2	4	Kevin Harvick	Stewart–Haas Racing	Ford	404	51
7	14	3	Austin Dillon	Richard Childress Racing	Chevrolet	404	30
8	1	18	Kyle Busch	Joe Gibbs Racing	Toyota	404	41
9	21	17	Ricky Stenhouse Jr.	Roush Fenway Racing	Ford	404	28
10	19	19	Daniel Suárez	Joe Gibbs Racing	Toyota	404	27
11	8	12	Ryan Blaney	Team Penske	Ford	404	30
12	10	42	Kyle Larson	Chip Ganassi Racing	Chevrolet	404	25
13	11	10	Aric Almirola	Stewart–Haas Racing	Ford	404	32
14	4	2	Brad Keselowski	Team Penske	Ford	404	29
15	3	78	Martin Truex Jr.	Furniture Row Racing	Toyota	404	31
16	18	21	Paul Menard	Wood Brothers Racing	Ford	403	21
17	17	31	Ryan Newman	Richard Childress Racing	Chevrolet	403	20
18	20	1	Jamie McMurray	Chip Ganassi Racing	Chevrolet	402	19
19	22	24	William Byron (R)	Hendrick Motorsports	Chevrolet	402	18
20	28	6	Matt Kenseth	Roush Fenway Racing	Ford	402	17
21	25	95	Regan Smith	Leavine Family Racing	Chevrolet	401	16
22	24	47	A. J. Allmendinger	JTG Daugherty Racing	Chevrolet	400	15
23	29	43	Bubba Wallace (R)	Richard Petty Motorsports	Chevrolet	399	14
24	26	38	David Ragan	Front Row Motorsports	Ford	399	13
25	23	37	Chris Buescher	JTG Daugherty Racing	Chevrolet	399	12
26	27	34	Michael McDowell	Front Row Motorsports	Ford	399	11
27	31	32	Matt DiBenedetto	Go Fas Racing	Ford	397	10
28	12	88	Alex Bowman	Hendrick Motorsports	Chevrolet	396	9
29	30	13	Ty Dillon	Germain Racing	Chevrolet	396	8
30	33	72	Corey LaJoie	TriStar Motorsports	Chevrolet	394	7
31	37	96	Jeffrey Earnhardt	Gaunt Brothers Racing	Toyota	394	6
32	35	23	J. J. Yeley (i)	BK Racing	Toyota	392	0
33	34	00	Landon Cassill (i)	StarCom Racing	Chevrolet	390	0
34	36	51	B. J. McLeod (i)	Rick Ware Racing	Ford	389	0
35	5	14	Clint Bowyer	Stewart–Haas Racing	Ford	388	18
36	13	48	Jimmie Johnson	Hendrick Motorsports	Chevrolet	387	1
37	32	15	Ross Chastain (i)	Premium Motorsports	Chevrolet	314	0
38	39	52	Harrison Rhodes	Rick Ware Racing	Chevrolet	308	1
39	38	66	Timmy Hill (i)	MBM Motorsports	Toyota	35	0
Official race results

=== Race statistics ===
- Lead changes: 15 among 8 different drivers
- Cautions/Laps: 5 for 31 laps
- Red flags: 1 for 4 minutes and 59 seconds
- Time of race: 3 hours, 18 minutes and 2 seconds
- Average speed: 122.404 miles per hour (196.990 km/h)

== Media ==
=== Television ===
NBC Sports covered the race on the television side. Rick Allen, 2006 race winner Jeff Burton, Steve Letarte and 2001 race winner Dale Earnhardt Jr. called the race from the broadcast booth, while Dave Burns, Marty Snider and Kelli Stavast reported from pit lane.

NBCSN
Booth announcers	Pit reporters
Lap-by-lap: Rick Allen; Color commentator: Jeff Burton; Color commentator: Steve Letarte; Color commentator: Dale Earnhardt Jr.	Dave Burns; Marty Snider; Kelli Stavast

=== Radio ===
MRN had the radio call for the race, which was simulcast on SiriusXM's NASCAR Radio channel.

MRN
Booth announcers	Turn announcers	Pit reporters
Lead announcer: Joe Moore; Announcer: Jeff Striegle; Announcer: Rusty Wallace	Backstretch: Mike Bagley	Alex Hayden; Winston Kelley; Steve Post; Kim Coon

== Standings after the race ==
	Pos	Driver	Points
1	1	Kevin Harvick	3,101
1	2	Kyle Busch	3,096 (–5)
	3	Martin Truex Jr.	3,069 (–32)
2	4	Joey Logano	3,064 (–37)
4	5	Chase Elliott	3,056 (–45)
1	6	Kurt Busch	3,054 (–47)
3	7	Brad Keselowski	3,054 (–47)
	8	Ryan Blaney	3,043 (–58)
2	9	Aric Almirola	3,033 (–68)
5	10	Clint Bowyer	3,033 (–68)
1	11	Kyle Larson	3,031 (–70)
	12	Alex Bowman	3,009 (–92)
1	13	Austin Dillon	2,101 (–1,000)
1	14	Jimmie Johnson	2,098 (–1,003)
	15	Denny Hamlin	2,094 (–1,007)
	16	Erik Jones	2,079 (–1,022)
Official driver's standings

Manufacturers' Championship standings

Pos	Manufacturer	Points
1	Ford	1,084
2	Toyota	1,075 (–9)
3	Chevrolet	990 (–94)
Official manufacturers' standings

- Note: Only the first 16 positions are included for the driver standings.

Previous race: 2018 Bank of America Roval 400	Monster Energy NASCAR Cup Series; 2018 season	Next race: 2018 1000Bulbs.com 500
