= B. J. McLeod =

American racing driver (born 1983)

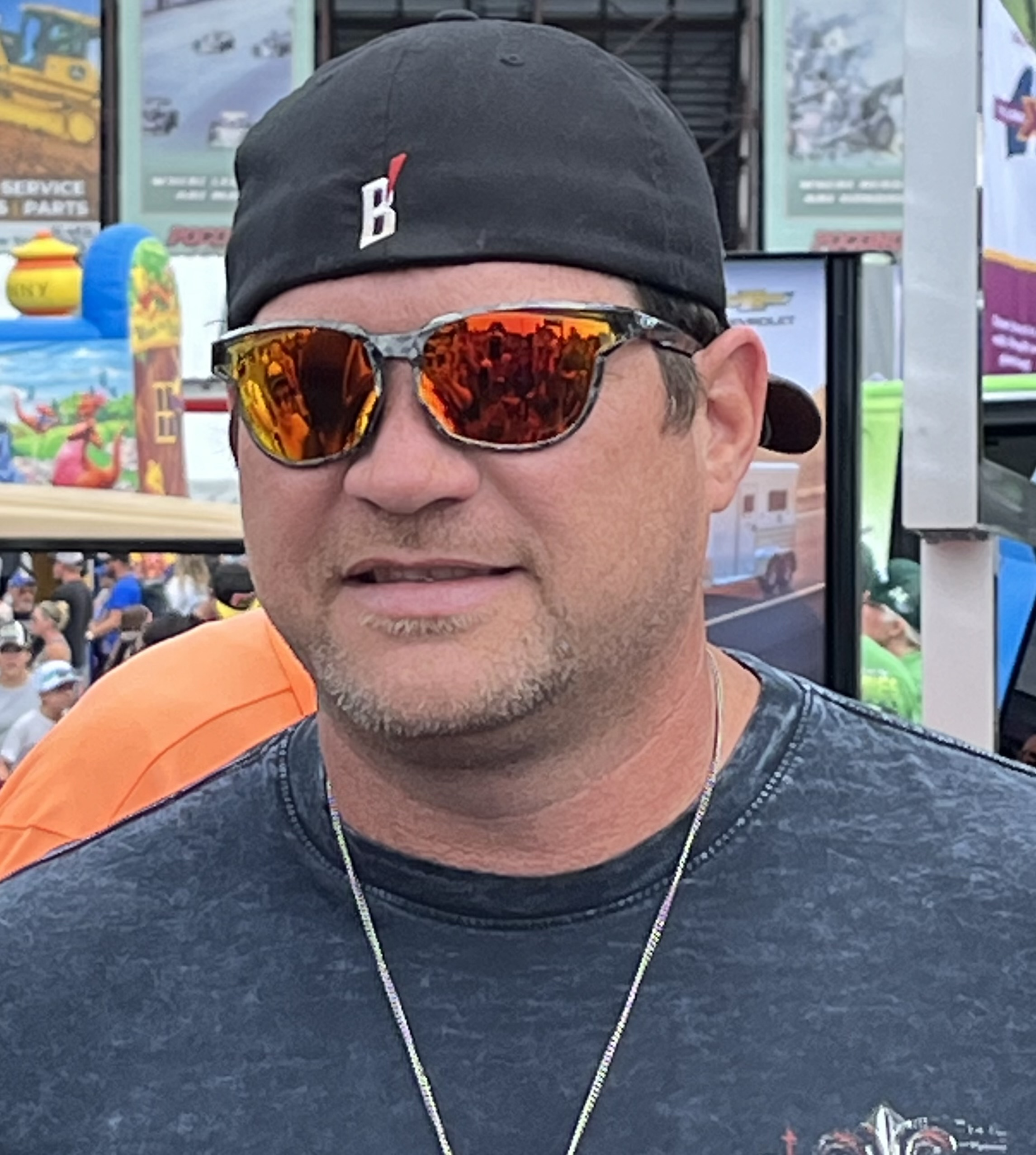
- McLeod at Pocono Raceway in 2023
- Born: Burton Darwin McLeod Jr. November 17, 1983 (age 43); Wauchula, Florida, U.S.
- Achievements: 2010 World Series of Asphalt Super Late Model Champion; 2006 Bright House Challenge Series Champion (Inaugural Season); 2004 Red Eye 100 Winner

NASCAR Cup Series career
- 153 races run over 11 years
- Car no., team: No. 78 (Live Fast Motorsports)
- 2026 position: 41st
- Best finish: 41st (2026)
- First race: 2015 Sylvania 300 (New Hampshire)
- Last race: 2026 Bank of America 400 (Charlotte)
Wins	Top tens	Poles
0	2	0

NASCAR O'Reilly Auto Parts Series career
- 173 races run over 10 years
- 2026 position: 92nd
- Best finish: 20th (2016, 2019)
- First race: 2015 3M 250 (Iowa)
- Last race: 2026 BetRivers 200 (Dover)
Wins	Top tens	Poles
0	0	0

NASCAR FedEx Freight Truck Series career
- 42 races run over 13 years
- 2025 position: 56th
- Best finish: 32nd (2015)
- First race: 2010 Kroger 200 (Martinsville)
- Last race: 2025 North Carolina Education Lottery 200 (Charlotte)
Wins	Top tens	Poles
0	0	0

ARCA Menards Series career
- 1 race run over 1 year
- Best finish: 144th (2014)
- First race: 2014 ModSpace 125 (Pocono)
Wins	Top tens	Poles
0	0	0
- Statistics up to date as of November 8, 2026.

Burton Darwin "B. J." McLeod Jr. (born November 17, 1983) is an American professional stock car racing driver and team owner. McLeod co-owns Live Fast Motorsports (along with Joe Falk), a NASCAR Cup Series team which fields the No. 78 Chevrolet Camaro ZL1, which he drives part-time. He has also previously competed in the NASCAR O'Reilly Auto Parts Series, the NASCAR Craftsman Truck Series, and the ARCA Menards Series.

== Racing career ==
=== Early years ===
Early in his career, McLeod was a go-kart and super late model driver in the Southeast. He was noted around the Southeast for being the youngest driver in several of the divisions he competed in as a teenager, including the Hooters Pro Cup. In 2000, McLeod competed in two Pro Cup races at Hickory Motor Speedway and USA International Speedway, with a best finish of 31st in the former. The following year, he ran an American Speed Association National Tour race at Fairgrounds Speedway for Herzog Motorsports, finishing fifteenth. After a test session with Herzog, McLeod had an agreement in place to run a limited NASCAR O'Reilly Auto Parts Series schedule for the team in 2002 but it never materialized.

=== NASCAR ===
==== Craftsman Truck Series ====
McLeod began racing in NASCAR's top three series in 2010, making his Camping World Truck Series debut at Martinsville Speedway in the No. 9 for Germain Racing; after qualifying 23rd, he finished seventeenth. The following year he split time in a partial schedule with his own team, SS-Green Light Racing and RSS Racing. In 2012, McLeod again ran a partial schedule, this time with RSS, Glenden Enterprises and Hillman Racing. For 2013, he focused on his own team and only made one race, the season finale at Homestead–Miami Speedway. The following year, McLeod served as a part-time start and park driver for SS-Green Light. In 2015, while doing a part-time Xfinity schedule, McLeod again started and parked, this time for his own team. While running a 2016 full-time Xfinity schedule, McLeod came back to the Trucks with SSGLR for one race in 2016, turning in a top-fifteen, lead-lap finish at Kansas Speedway in the No. 07.

Each year since 2017 except for 2022, McLeod has made at least one start in the Truck Series each year, mostly driving start and park or other backmarker entries in the series. In 2017, he made one start for Norm Benning Racing and another two for Copp Motorsports in partnership with MB Motorsports. In 2018, McLeod failed to qualify for the season-opener at Daytona for TJL Motorsports, and then ran one race with three other teams: Beaver Motorsports, Mike Harmon Racing, and Reaume Brothers Racing. McLeod also made one additional attempt with both Harmon and Reaume's teams that year, which ended up being DNQs. McLeod made one start for Vizion Motorsports using Beaver's owner points in 2019, along with one DNQ for Jacob Wallace Racing. He returned to RBR in 2020 and 2021, attempting one race in each season.

On February 2, 2023, G2G Racing owner Tim Viens stated in an interview for TobyChristie.com that McLeod and Brennan Poole would drive for the team in the races at Las Vegas and Atlanta in March, with one driver in the No. 46 and the other in the No. 47 truck. However, McLeod did not end up running either race for the team.

On May 16, 2025, Spire Motorsports announced that McLeod would drive their No. 07 truck in the race at Charlotte with sponsorship from the Pigeon Forge Racing Coaster, arguably giving him his first opportunity in NASCAR in competitive equipment.

==== ARCA ====
In 2014, he ran an ARCA Racing Series event at Pocono Raceway for Venturini Motorsports, finishing 27th. He drove the team's No. 15 Zaxby's Toyota, substituting for the injured John Wes Townley. This has been McLeod's only ARCA start to date.

==== O'Reilly Auto Parts Series ====
In 2015, he joined Rick Ware Racing at Iowa Speedway for his Xfinity Series debut, retiring after 68 laps due to brake troubles, and was credited with a 36th-place finish. McLeod then proceeded to bounce between different teams, starting and parking and running full races. McLeod in that season ran for RWR, a partnership between SS-Green Light Racing and Young's Motorsports, MBM Motorsports, and King Autosport.

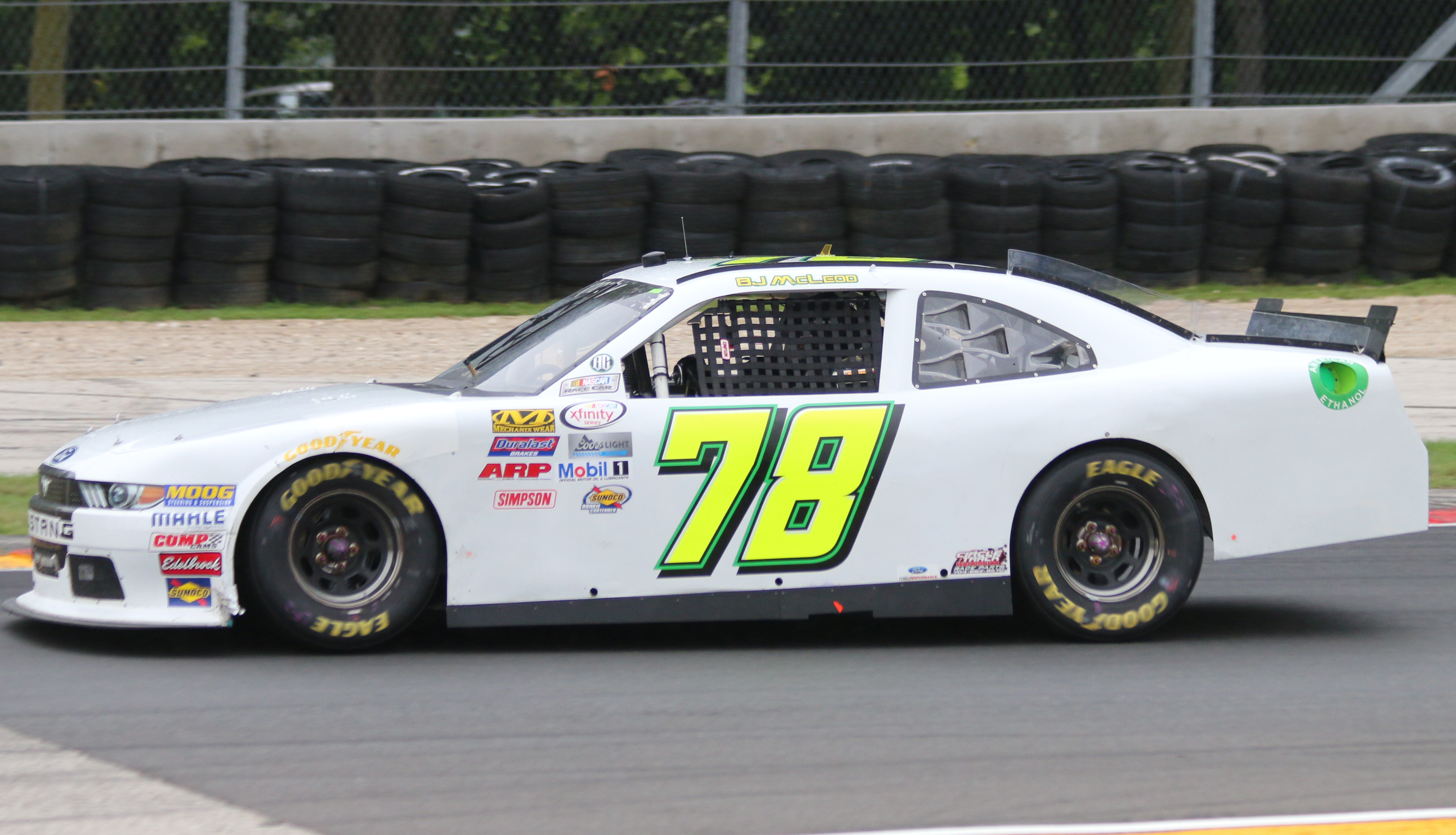
2016 Xfinity Series car at Road America

McLeod took on a full-time Xfinity schedule in 2016, his first full slate in a NASCAR national series. He ran the full schedule with his own B. J. McLeod Motorsports No. 78 car, scoring three top twenty finishes.

In 2017, McLeod rotated between the Nos. 78 and 8 while taking some races off to give to pay drivers as he focused on making his team better.

==== Cup Series ====
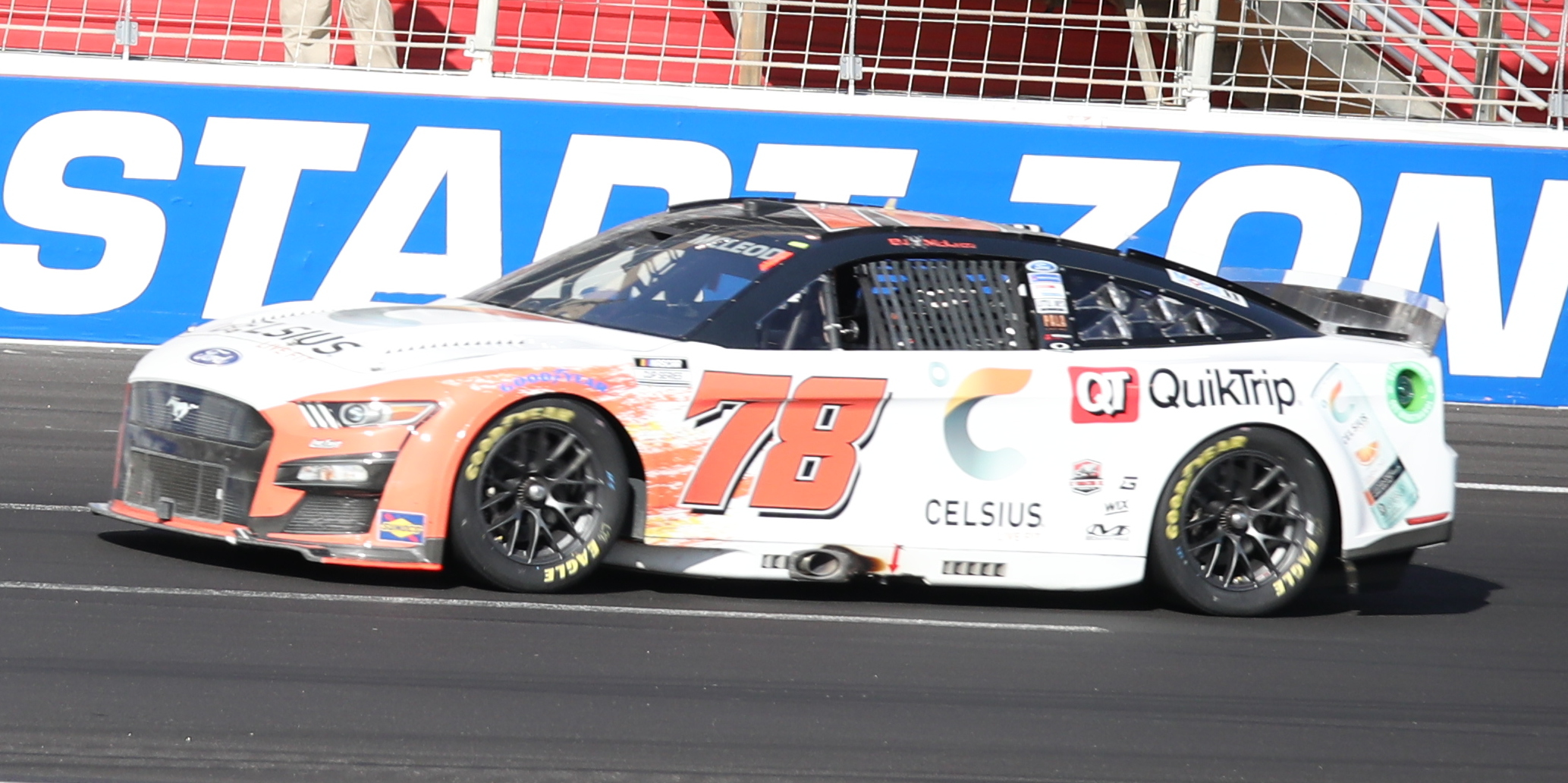
McLeod in the No. 78 at Atlanta Motor Speedway in 2022

McLeod made his Sprint Cup Series debut in the 2015 Sylvania 300, driving the No. 33 Chevrolet SS for Circle Sport. Two years later, he returned to the Cup Series and Ware for the 2017 Quaker State 400 at Kentucky, driving the No. 51. McLeod continued to drive part-time in the No. 51 car, recording his first top-thirty finish at Kansas Speedway.

In 2019, McLeod joined Ware for his Daytona 500 debut. During the race, McLeod and fellow RWR teammate Cody Ware crashed while several cars were entering pit road, with McLeod spinning into the grass in the tri-oval; despite the wreck, McLeod would continue the race and finish nineteenth due to most of his fellow competitors being involved in crashes throughout the race. McLeod would then participate in 17 other events for Rick Ware Racing across their No. 51, No. 52, and No. 53 cars.

McLeod returned to RWR for the 2020 Daytona 500 in the No. 52, where he, Aric Almirola, and Quin Houff crashed on the backstretch on lap 160, causing him to finish 38th. In May, McLeod expanded his B. J. McLeod Motorsports team to the Cup level, running the No. 78 for the team in several races beginning with The Real Heroes 400 at Darlington Raceway. McLeod's team did a total of 15 races in 2020, with plans at one point to participate in the races at Martinsville and Homestead, however, the team withdrew from those two races. Also, at times when BJMM was participating in some Cup races, McLeod was driving for Spire Motorsports' No. 77, or he was not participating in those races when his No. 78 was entered.

McLeod, running for his newly created Live Fast Motorsports team, survived the chaos throughout the 2021 Coke Zero Sugar 400 to initially finish in tenth place. Chris Buescher would later be disqualified from second place, bumping McLeod up to ninth place. This race marked his first top-ten in any of the top three NASCAR divisions. After LFM sold their charter to Spire Motorsports at the end of the 2023 season, the team scaled back to running part-time. McLeod attempted to run the 2024 Daytona 500 but failed to make the race after finishing fourteenth in Duel 2 of the 2024 Bluegreen Vacations Duels. He would lead laps at Talladega with a best finish of nineteenth all year at the 2024 Coke Zero Sugar 400 at Daytona.

=== Team owner career ===
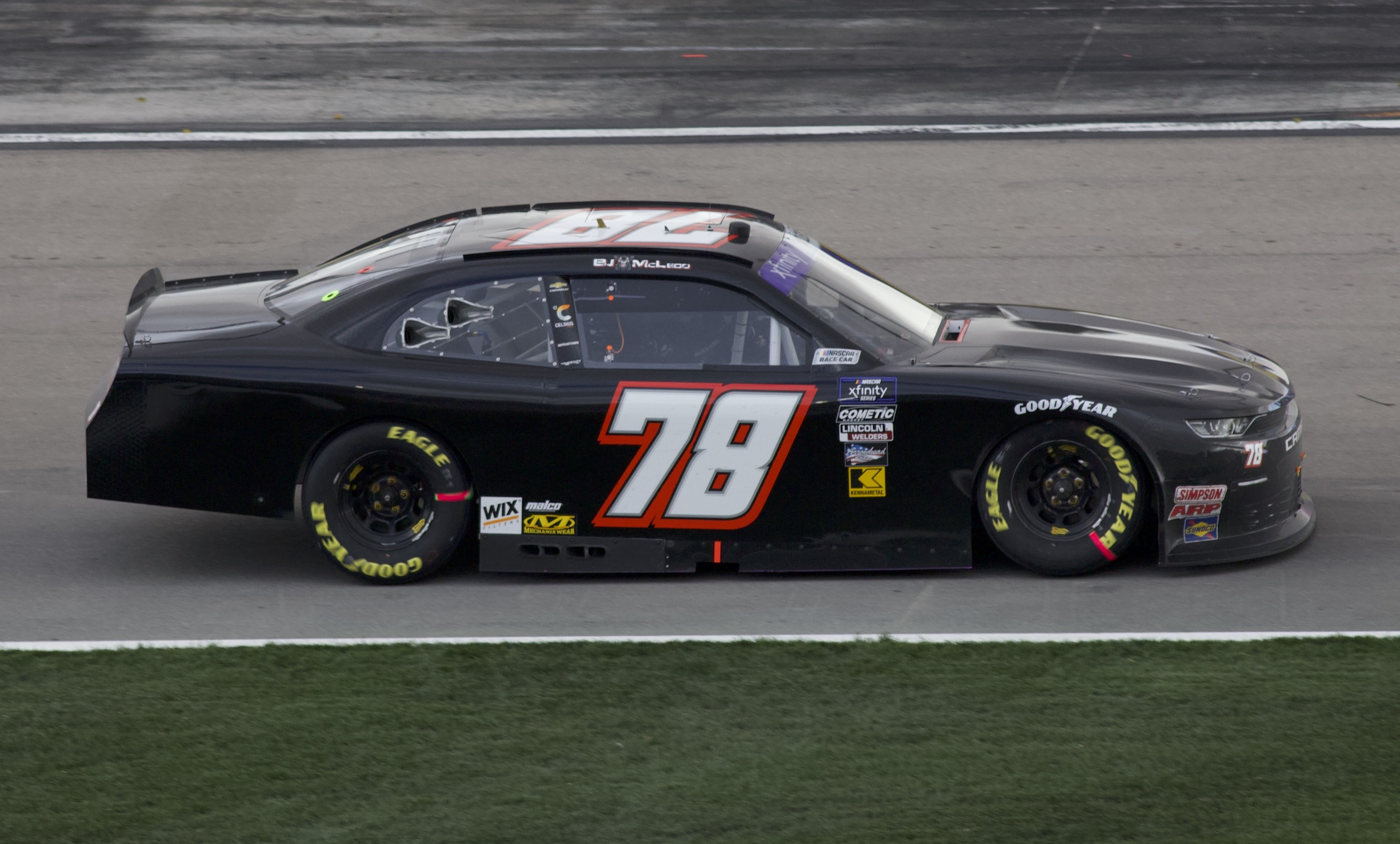
McLeod's No. 78 car at Las Vegas Motor Speedway in 2024.

McLeod started a driver development program, known as B. J. McLeod Motorsports, running late model and K&N Pro Series East events, and fielded rides for drivers like Matt Tifft and Scott Heckert. In 2014, McLeod partnered with Tommy Regan to field a Truck Series team, the No. 45, for Regan at Iowa Speedway; despite initially having to qualify faster than two other trucks to qualify, Wauters Motorsports and the start and park ride of MB Motorsports withdrew, guaranteeing the No. 45 a spot in the race. Regan finished last after ignition problems on lap one.

The team made its NASCAR Xfinity Series debut at Daytona in 2016, fielding two cars: the No. 78 and No. 99 Fords. McLeod ran the full season in the 78 and ran the 99 part-time with drivers like Todd Peck, Stanton Barrett, and Jeff Green. He also ran a third part-time team, the No. 15, in an alliance with Rick Ware Racing, with Peck driving most of the races.

In 2017, McLeod expanded to two full-time teams; originally the plan was for McLeod to drive the 78 and for Jeff Green to drive the 8 car. The team also entered a 99 car with last year's owner points; however, the team is operated by SS-Green Light Racing. McLeod took the first two races of the season off to put Clint King in the car. Later in the season, at Talladega, Green led the team's first laps and scored its first top-ten finish. Green, however, would only drive one more race for the team, as McLeod slotted to the 8 car and a rotation of drivers including Tommy Joe Martins, Jordan Anderson, Angela Ruch, Stephen Young, Josh Bilicki, John Graham and Jennifer Jo Cobb drove the 78.

On October 23, 2020, McLeod and Matt Tifft purchased Archie St. Hilare's half of Go Fas Racing's charter and formed Live Fast Motorsports. McLeod and Tifft used the charter full-time from 2021 until they sold it to Spire Motorsports at the end of the 2023 season. B. J. McLeod Motorsports will continue operating at the Xfinity level.

For the 2024 season, McLeod attempted to run the 2024 Daytona 500, but failed to make the race after finishing fourteenth in Duel 2 of the 2024 Bluegreen Vacations Duels. He ran a total of five races with LFM and two with MBM Motorsports in 2024 and finished 51st in the drivers' points standings. On December 19, LFM announced the team will run all six superspeedway races and the Coca-Cola 600 in 2025.

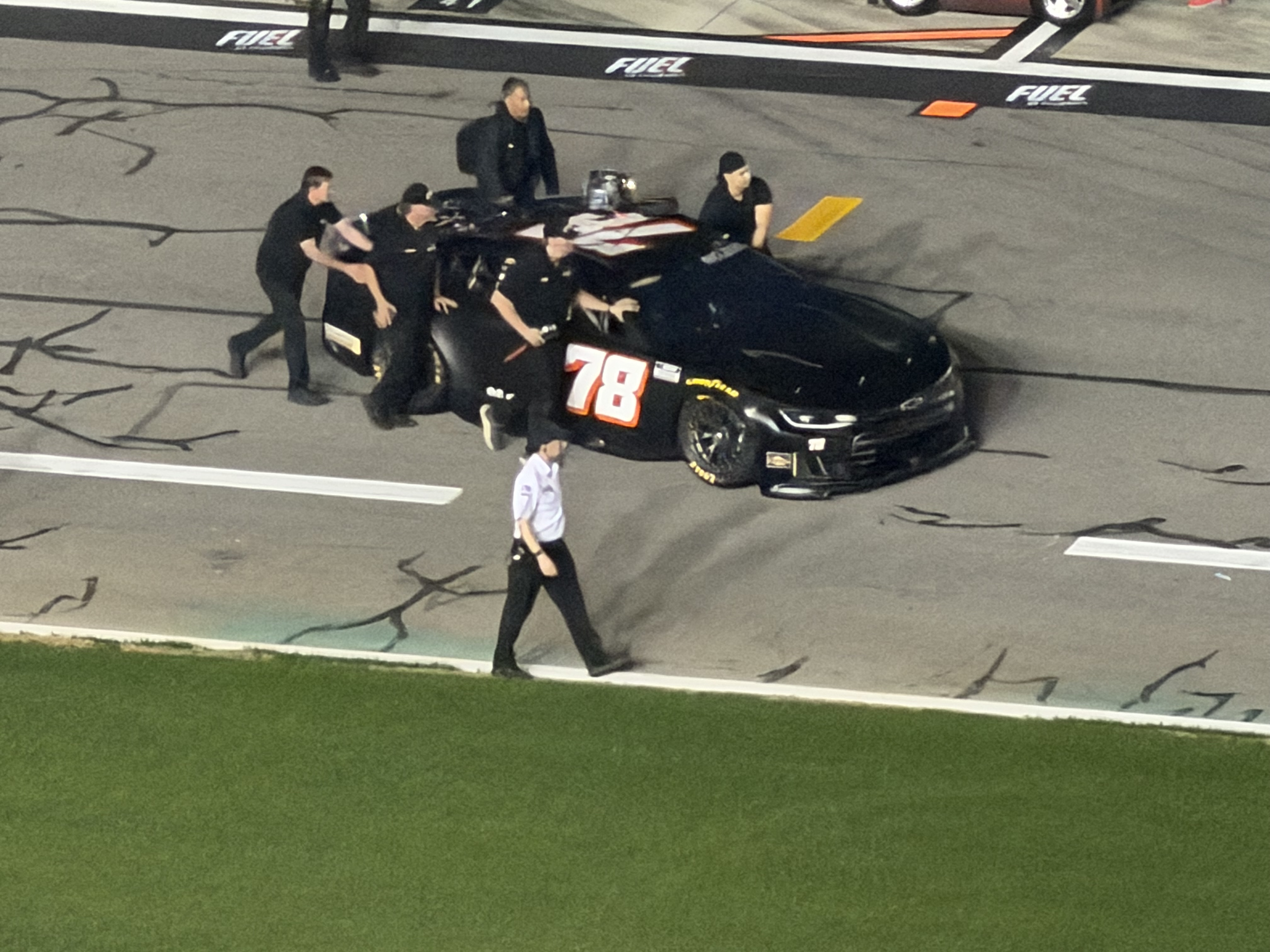
McLeod's No. 78 car at Daytona International Speedway ahead of qualifying for the 2026 Daytona 500.

During the 2025 season, McLeod failed to qualify for the 2025 Daytona 500. On March 3, the team announced that Katherine Legge would drive the No. 78 car in her Cup Series debut at Phoenix.

== Motorsports career results ==
=== NASCAR ===
(key) (Bold – Pole position awarded by qualifying time. Italics – Pole position earned by points standings or practice time. * – Most laps led.)

==== Cup Series ====
NASCAR Cup Series results
Year	Team	No.	Make	1	2	3	4	5	6	7	8	9	10	11	12	13	14	15	16	17	18	19	20	21	22	23	24	25	26	27	28	29	30	31	32	33	34	35	36	NCSC	Pts	Ref
2015	Circle Sport	33	Chevy	DAY	ATL	LVS	PHO	CAL	MAR	TEX	BRI	RCH	TAL	KAN	CLT	DOV	POC	MCH	SON	DAY	KEN	NHA	IND	POC	GLN	MCH	BRI	DAR	RCH	CHI	NHA; 34	DOV	CLT	KAN	TAL	MAR	TEX	PHO	HOM	69th	0^{1}	
2017	Rick Ware Racing	51	Chevy	DAY	ATL	LVS	PHO	CAL	MAR	TEX	BRI	RCH	TAL	KAN	CLT	DOV	POC	MCH	SON	DAY	KEN; 32	NHA	IND; 32	POC	GLN	MCH; 36	BRI; 32	DAR	RCH; 37	CHI	NHA	DOV; 36	CLT; 32	TAL	KAN; 30	MAR	TEX	PHO	HOM	60th	0^{1}	
2018	Rick Ware Racing	51	Chevy	DAY	ATL	LVS	PHO	CAL	MAR	TEX	BRI	RCH	TAL	DOV	KAN; 35	CLT; 33	POC	MCH; 37	SON	CHI; 35	DAY	KEN; 32	NHA; 34	POC; 40	GLN			DAR; 32							KAN; 33	MAR	TEX	PHO		65th	0^{1}	
2018	Rick Ware Racing	51	Ford																							MCH; 31				LVS; 28	RCH	ROV	DOV; 34	TAL					HOM; 35	65th	0^{1}	
2018	Rick Ware Racing	52	Ford																								BRI; DNQ		IND; 30											65th	0^{1}	
2019	Rick Ware Racing	51	Chevy	DAY; 19						TEX; 31	BRI	RCH	TAL														BRI; 32	DAR; 39					DOV; 29	TAL	KAN	MAR; 27	TEX	PHO		48th	0^{1}	
2019	Rick Ware Racing	52	Chevy		ATL; 32									DOV; 37	KAN							KEN; 36	NHA																	48th	0^{1}	
2019	Rick Ware Racing	52	Ford			LVS; 37	PHO	CAL; 37	MAR																															48th	0^{1}	
2019	Rick Ware Racing	53	Chevy													CLT; 29	POC	MCH	SON																				HOM; 32	48th	0^{1}	
2019	Rick Ware Racing	51	Ford																	CHI; 36	DAY; 28			POC; 33	GLN	MCH			IND; 25	LVS; 33	RCH	ROV								48th	0^{1}	
2020	Rick Ware Racing	52	Ford	DAY; 38	LVS	CAL	PHO																																	47th	0^{1}	
2020	B. J. McLeod Motorsports	78	Chevy					DAR; 39	DAR; 36				ATL; 40	MAR			POC; 39	POC; 37	IND; 22	KEN	TEX; 33	KAN; 39	NHA	MCH	MCH	DRC	DOV; 38	DOV; 31	DAY	DAR	RCH	BRI	LVS	TAL	ROV	KAN	TEX	MAR	PHO	47th	0^{1}	
2020	B. J. McLeod Motorsports	78	Ford							CLT; 32	CLT; 35	BRI; 28																												47th	0^{1}	
2020	Spire Motorsports	77	Chevy												HOM; 35	TAL; 31																								47th	0^{1}	
2021	Live Fast Motorsports	78	Ford	DAY; 23	DRC	HOM; 34	LVS; 30	PHO; 30	ATL; 34	BRD	MAR; 29	RCH; 32	TAL; 25	KAN; 31	DAR; 32	DOV; 36	COA	CLT; 31	SON	NSH; 28	POC; 30	POC; 29	ROA	ATL; 30	NHA; 30	GLN	IRC	MCH; 28	DAY; 9	DAR; 27	RCH; 30	BRI; 37	LVS; 33	TAL; 30	ROV	TEX; 22	KAN; 30	MAR; 29	PHO; 27	47th	0^{1}	
2022	Live Fast Motorsports	78	Ford	DAY; 27	CAL; 22	LVS; 28	PHO; 33	ATL; 19	COA	RCH; 34	MAR; 36	BRD	TAL; 26	DOV; 35	DAR; 32	KAN; 36	CLT; 19	GTW; 30	SON	NSH; 32	ROA	ATL; 36	NHA; 36	POC; 30	IRC	MCH; 23	RCH; 33	GLN	DAY; 7	DAR; 29	KAN; 31	BRI; 24	TEX; 26	TAL; 33	ROV	LVS; 30	HOM; 33	MAR; 34	PHO; 31	45th	0^{1}	
2023	Live Fast Motorsports	78	Chevy	DAY; 30	CAL; 24	LVS; 32	PHO; 36	ATL; 36	COA	RCH	BRD; 26	MAR	TAL; 18	DOV; 29	KAN	DAR; 32	CLT; 29	GTW; 27	SON	NSH	CSC	ATL; 20	NHA; 31	POC; 32	RCH; 36	MCH	IRC	GLN	DAY; 23	DAR; 36	KAN	BRI; 31	TEX; 22	TAL; 29	ROV	LVS; 31	HOM	MAR; 36	PHO; 33	50th	0^{1}	
2024	Live Fast Motorsports	78	Chevy	DAY; DNQ	ATL; 24	LVS	PHO	BRI	COA	RCH	MAR	TEX	TAL; 32	DOV	KAN	DAR												DAY; 19	DAR	ATL; 25	GLN	BRI	KAN	TAL; 22	ROV	LVS	HOM	MAR	PHO	51st	0^{1}	
2024	MBM Motorsports	66	Ford														CLT; 37	GTW	SON	IOW	NHA	NSH	CSC	POC	IND; 39	RCH	MCH													51st	0^{1}	
2025	Live Fast Motorsports	78	Chevy	DAY; DNQ	ATL; 22	COA	PHO	LVS	HOM	MAR	DAR	BRI	TAL; 33	TEX	KAN	CLT	NSH	MCH	MXC	POC	ATL; 16	CSC	SON	DOV	IND	IOW	GLN	RCH	DAY; 32	DAR	GTW	BRI	NHA	KAN	ROV	LVS	TAL; 28	MAR	PHO	48th	0^{1}	
2026	Live Fast Motorsports	78	Chevy	DAY; 41	ATL; 35	COA	PHO	LVS	DAR	MAR	BRI	KAN	TAL	TEX	GLN	CLT	NSH	MCH	POC	COR	SON	CHI	ATL; 38	NWS	IND	IOW	RCH	NHA	DAY	DAR	GTW	BRI	KAN	LVS						41st	8	
2026	NY Racing Team	44	Chevy																																CLT; 33	PHO	TAL	MAR	HOM	41st	8	

===== Daytona 500 =====
Year	Team	Manufacturer	Start	Finish
2019	Rick Ware Racing	Chevrolet	38	19
2020	Rick Ware Racing	Ford	38	38
2021	Live Fast Motorsports	Ford	38	23
2022	Live Fast Motorsports	Ford	37	27
2023	Live Fast Motorsports	Chevrolet	32	30
2024	Live Fast Motorsports	Chevrolet	DNQ	
2025	Live Fast Motorsports	Chevrolet	DNQ	
2026	Live Fast Motorsports	Chevrolet	38	41

==== O'Reilly Auto Parts Series ====
NASCAR O'Reilly Auto Parts Series results
Year	Team	No.	Make	1	2	3	4	5	6	7	8	9	10	11	12	13	14	15	16	17	18	19	20	21	22	23	24	25	26	27	28	29	30	31	32	33	NOAPSC	Pts	Ref
2015	Rick Ware Racing	15	Chevy	DAY	ATL	LVS	PHO	CAL	TEX	BRI	RCH	TAL	IOW; 36	CLT; 37	DOV; 27	MCH	CHI	DAY	KEN; 34													CLT; 35					104th	0^{1}	
2015	SS-Green Light Racing	90	Chevy																	NHA; 24																	104th	0^{1}	
2015	MBM Motorsports	13	Dodge																		IND; 32	IOW	GLN	MOH	BRI	ROA											104th	0^{1}	
2015	MBM Motorsports	13	Chevy																								DAR; 31	RCH	CHI	KEN	DOV						104th	0^{1}	
2015	SS-Green Light Racing	15	Chevy																														KAN; 33	TEX			104th	0^{1}	
2015	King Autosport	92	Chevy																																PHO; 37	HOM; 38	104th	0^{1}	
2016	B. J. McLeod Motorsports	78	Ford	DAY; 24	ATL; 26	LVS; 27	PHO; 29	CAL; 33	TEX; 29	BRI; 28	RCH; 28	TAL; 36	DOV; 19	CLT; 25	POC; 22	MCH; 34	IOW; 19	DAY; 40	KEN; 23	NHA; 20	IND; 26	IOW; 23	GLN; 26	MOH; 27	BRI; 19	ROA; 28	DAR; 37	RCH; 32	CHI; 24	KEN; 21	DOV; 33	CLT; 30	KAN; 22	TEX; 28	PHO; 25	HOM; 31	20th	459	
2017	B. J. McLeod Motorsports	78	Chevy	DAY	ATL	LVS; 37	PHO; 25	CAL; 23	TEX; 27	BRI; 29	RCH; 37																									HOM; 33	26th	247	
2017	B. J. McLeod Motorsports	78	Toyota									TAL; DNQ						DAY; 11																			26th	247	
2017	B. J. McLeod Motorsports	8	Chevy										CLT; 29	DOV; 22	POC; 26	MCH; 30	IOW; 17		KEN; 24	NHA; 26	IND; 33	IOW; 22	GLN	MOH	BRI; 26	ROA	DAR; 27	RCH	CHI; 35	KEN; 28	DOV; 27	CLT; 28	KAN; 32	TEX; 26	PHO		26th	247	
2018	B. J. McLeod Motorsports	78	Chevy	DAY	ATL; 30	LVS; 26	PHO; 26	CAL; 22	TEX; 29	BRI; 20	RCH; 32		DOV; 23		POC; 22																						29th	276	
2018	B. J. McLeod Motorsports	78	Toyota									TAL; 19																									29th	276	
2018	B. J. McLeod Motorsports	99	Chevy											CLT; 40																							29th	276	
2018	Mike Harmon Racing	74	Chevy													MCH; 28																					29th	276	
2018	JD Motorsports	15	Chevy														IOW; 29	CHI; 25	DAY; 36	KEN; 21	NHA; 35	IOW	GLN	MOH	BRI; 19	ROA	DAR; 23	IND; 16	LVS; 19	RCH	ROV	DOV; 37					29th	276	
2018	JD Motorsports	01	Chevy																														KAN; 23	TEX; 36	PHO; 23	HOM; 32	29th	276	
2019	JD Motorsports	15	Chevy	DAY; 27	ATL; 24	LVS; 20	PHO; 21	CAL; 24	TEX; 32	BRI; 18		TAL; 22	DOV; 27	CLT; 18	POC; 17	MCH; 19	IOW	CHI; 23	DAY; 33				GLN; 27	MOH; 26	BRI; 26	ROA; 23		IND; 22		RCH; 30	ROV; 23	DOV; 16					20th	425	
2019	B. J. McLeod Motorsports	99	Toyota								RCH; 30																										20th	425	
2019	JD Motorsports	4	Chevy																	KEN; 20							DAR; 19		LVS; 22				KAN; 19	TEX; 16	PHO	HOM; 20	20th	425	
2019	JD Motorsports	01	Chevy																		NHA; 21	IOW															20th	425	
2020	JD Motorsports	0	Chevy	DAY; 13	LVS; 33	CAL; 24	PHO; 20																														21st	433	
2020	JD Motorsports	6	Chevy					DAR; 15	CLT; 17	BRI; 11	ATL; 25	HOM; 26	HOM; 34	TAL; 23	POC; 14	IRC; 29	KEN; 18	KEN; 20	TEX; 20	KAN; 31	ROA	DRC; 20	DOV; 34	DOV; 25	DAY; 32		RCH; 29	RCH; 24	BRI; 34	LVS; 26	TAL						21st	433	
2020	B. J. McLeod Motorsports	78	Chevy																							DAR; 14									MAR; 33	PHO; 14	21st	433	
2020	JD Motorsports	4	Chevy																													ROV; 22	KAN; 17				21st	433	
2020	DGM Racing	90	Chevy																															TEX; 17			21st	433	
2021	DGM Racing	90	Chevy	DAY	DRC	HOM	LVS	PHO	ATL	MAR	TAL	DAR; 26			CLT; DNQ	MOH	TEX	NSH	POC	ROA	ATL	NHA	GLN	IRC	MCH	DAY	DAR; 22	RCH									96th	0^{1}	
2021	B. J. McLeod Motorsports	99	Chevy										DOV; 21	COA																LVS; 30	TAL	ROV	TEX	KAN	MAR	PHO	96th	0^{1}	
2021	JD Motorsports	15	Chevy																										BRI; 26								96th	0^{1}	
2022	SS-Green Light Racing	08	Ford	DAY	CAL	LVS	PHO	ATL	COA	RCH	MAR	TAL	DOV	DAR	TEX	CLT	PIR	NSH; 28	ROA	ATL	NHA	POC	IRC	MCH	GLN	DAY	DAR	KAN									57th	29	
2022	B. J. McLeod Motorsports	78	Chevy																										BRI; 34	TEX	TAL; 26	ROV	LVS	HOM; 36	MAR	PHO; 32	57th	29	
2023	Emerling-Gase Motorsports	53	Chevy	DAY	CAL	LVS	PHO	ATL	COA	RCH	MAR	TAL	DOV	DAR	CLT	PIR	SON	NSH	CSC	ATL	NHA	POC	ROA	MCH	IRC	GLN	DAY	DAR	KAN	BRI; Wth							68th	1	
2023	Emerling-Gase Motorsports	35	Chevy																											BRI; 37	TEX	ROV	LVS	HOM	MAR	PHO	68th	1	
2024	B. J. McLeod Motorsports	78	Chevy	DAY; 15	ATL; 18	LVS; 32	PHO; 14	COA	RCH	MAR	TEX	TAL	DOV	DAR	CLT	PIR	SON	IOW	NHA	NSH	CSC	POC															40th	78	
2024	MBM Motorsports	13	Chevy																				IND; 28	MCH	DAY	DAR	ATL	GLN	BRI	KAN	TAL	ROV	LVS	HOM	MAR	PHO	40th	78	
2026	DGM Racing with Jesse Iwuji Motorsports	92	Chevy	DAY	ATL	COA	PHO	LVS	DAR	MAR	ROC	BRI	KAN	TAL	TEX	GLN	DOV; 29	CLT	NSH	POC	COR	SON	CHI	ATL	IND	IOW	DAY	DAR	GTW	BRI	LVS	CLT	PHO	TAL	MAR	HOM	92nd	0^{1}	

==== Craftsman Truck Series ====
NASCAR Craftsman Truck Series results
Year	Team	No.	Make	1	2	3	4	5	6	7	8	9	10	11	12	13	14	15	16	17	18	19	20	21	22	23	24	25	NCTC	Pts	Ref
2010	B. J. McLeod Motorsports	9	Chevy	DAY	ATL	MAR	NSH	KAN	DOV	CLT	TEX	MCH	IOW	GTY	IRP	POC	NSH	DAR	BRI	CHI	KEN	NHA	LVS	MAR; 17	TAL	TEX	PHO	HOM	95th	112	
2011	SS-Green Light Racing	07	Chevy	DAY	PHO; 35	DAR	MAR	NSH	DOV	CLT	KAN	TEX	KEN	IOW															37th	112	
2011	B. J. McLeod Motorsports	78	Chevy												NSH; 20	IRP	POC	MCH	BRI	ATL; 30	CHI	NHA							37th	112	
2011	RSS Racing	93	Chevy																				KEN; 26	LVS; 23	TAL; 27	MAR	TEX; 21	HOM	37th	112	
2012	RSS Racing	38	Chevy	DAY	MAR; DNQ	CAR	KAN																						50th	50	
2012	RSS Racing	93	Chevy					CLT; DNQ	DOV																				50th	50	
2012	Glenden Enterprises	84	Chevy							TEX; 23	KEN	IOW	CHI	POC	MCH														50th	50	
2012	Hillman Racing	27	Chevy													BRI; 15	ATL	IOW	KEN										50th	50	
2012	Hillman Racing	25	Chevy																	LVS; 32	TAL	MAR	TEX; 33	PHO	HOM				50th	50	
2013	B. J. McLeod Motorsports	78	Chevy	DAY	MAR	CAR	KAN	CLT	DOV	TEX	KEN	IOW	ELD	POC	MCH	BRI	MSP	IOW	CHI	LVS	TAL	MAR	TEX	PHO	HOM; 19				62nd	25	
2014	SS-Green Light Racing	07	Chevy	DAY	MAR	KAN	CLT	DOV	TEX; 25	GTW	KEN	IOW	ELD	POC; 30	MCH	BRI; 34			NHA; 26	LVS; 27	TAL	MAR	TEX	PHO; 32	HOM				39th	107	
2014	SS-Green Light Racing	08	Chevy														MSP; 27	CHI											39th	107	
2015	B. J. McLeod Motorsports	45	Chevy	DAY	ATL	MAR	KAN; 28	CLT; 31	DOV; 27	TEX; 27	GTW	IOW	KEN; 29	ELD	POC; 29	MCH; 30	BRI; DNQ	MSP; 28	CHI; 28	NHA	LVS; 28	TAL	MAR	TEX	PHO	HOM			32nd	138	
2016	SS-Green Light Racing	07	Chevy	DAY	ATL	MAR	KAN; 15	DOV	CLT	TEX	IOW	GTW	KEN	ELD	POC	BRI	MCH	MSP	CHI	NHA	LVS	TAL	MAR	TEX	PHO	HOM			94th	0^{1}	
2017	Norm Benning Racing	57	Chevy	DAY	ATL	MAR	KAN	CLT	DOV	TEX	GTW	IOW	KEN; 31	ELD	POC														92nd	0^{1}	
2017	Copp Motorsports	63	Chevy													MCH; 24	BRI	MSP											92nd	0^{1}	
2017	Copp Motorsports	36	Chevy																CHI; 30	NHA	LVS	TAL	MAR	TEX	PHO	HOM			92nd	0^{1}	
2018	TJL Motorsports	1	Chevy	DAY; DNQ	ATL																								105th	0^{1}	
2018	Beaver Motorsports	50	Chevy			LVS; 23	MAR	DOV	KAN	CLT	TEX	IOW																	105th	0^{1}	
2018	Mike Harmon Racing	74	Chevy										GTW; DNQ	CHI	KEN	ELD	POC; 24												105th	0^{1}	
2018	Reaume Brothers Racing	34	Chevy															MCH; 29											105th	0^{1}	
2018	Reaume Brothers Racing	33	Chevy																BRI; DNQ	MSP	LVS	TAL	MAR	TEX	PHO	HOM			105th	0^{1}	
2019	Jacob Wallace Racing	80	Ford	DAY	ATL; DNQ	LVS	MAR	TEX	DOV	KAN	CLT	TEX	IOW	GTW															112th	0^{1}	
2019	Beaver Motorsports	1	Toyota												CHI; 30	KEN	POC	ELD	MCH	BRI	MSP	LVS	TAL	MAR	PHO	HOM			112th	0^{1}	
2020	Reaume Brothers Racing	33	Toyota	DAY	LVS	CLT	ATL	HOM	POC	KEN	TEX	KAN	KAN	MCH	DRC	DOV	GTW	DAR	RCH	BRI	LVS	TAL	KAN	TEX	MAR; 22	PHO			91st	0^{1}	
2021	Reaume Brothers Racing	34	Toyota	DAY	DRC	LVS; 26	ATL	BRD	RCH	KAN																			85th	5	
2021	Reaume Brothers Racing	33	Chevy								DAR; 32	COA	CLT	TEX	NSH	POC	KNX	GLN	GTW	DAR	BRI	LVS	TAL	MAR	PHO				85th	5	
2025	Spire Motorsports	07	Chevy	DAY	ATL	LVS	HOM	MAR	BRI	CAR	TEX	KAN	NWS	CLT; 15	NSH	MCH	POC	LRP	IRP	GLN	RCH	DAR	BRI	NHA	ROV	TAL	MAR	PHO	56th	22	

^{*} Season still in progress
^{1} Ineligible for series points
^{2} Switched from Xfinity to Truck points on May 4

=== ARCA Racing Series ===
(key) (Bold – Pole position awarded by qualifying time. Italics – Pole position earned by points standings or practice time. * – Most laps led.)

ARCA Racing Series results
Year	Team	No.	Make	1	2	3	4	5	6	7	8	9	10	11	12	13	14	15	16	17	18	19	20	ARSC	Pts	Ref
2014	Venturini Motorsports	15	Toyota	DAY	MOB	SLM	TAL	TOL	NJE	POC	MCH	ELK	WIN	CHI	IRP	POC; 27	BLN	ISF	MAD	DSF	SLM	KEN	KAN	144th	70	
