= 2024 Daytona 500 =

66th Running of the event, held in Daytona Beach, Florida

Race details
- Race 1 of 36 in the 2024 NASCAR Cup Series
- Date: February 19, 2024
- Location: Daytona International Speedway in Daytona Beach, Florida
- Course: Permanent racing facility 2.5 mi (4 km)
- Distance: 200 laps, 500 mi (800 km)
- Average speed: 157.178 miles per hour (252.953 km/h)

Pole position
Driver	Joey Logano	Team Penske
- Time: 49.465

Qualifying race winners
Duel 1 Winner	Tyler Reddick	23XI Racing
Duel 2 Winner	Christopher Bell	Joe Gibbs Racing

Most laps led
Driver	Joey Logano	Team Penske
- Laps: 46

Winner
No. 24	William Byron	Hendrick Motorsports

Television in the United States
- Network: Fox
- Announcers: Mike Joy, Clint Bowyer, and Kevin Harvick

Radio in the United States
- Radio: MRN
- Booth announcers: Alex Hayden, Jeff Striegle, and Rusty Wallace
- Turn announcers: Dave Moody (1 & 2), Mike Bagley (Backstretch), and Dillon Welch (3 & 4)

The 2024 Daytona 500 was a NASCAR Cup Series race and the 66th running of the event. It was held on Monday, February 19, 2024, at Daytona International Speedway in Daytona Beach, Florida, United States. It was the first race of the 2024 NASCAR Cup Series season. It was originally supposed to be run on February 18, but was postponed due to rain.

William Byron of Hendrick Motorsports won the race after Ross Chastain and Austin Cindric, who were running second and third, crashed in the tri-oval coming to the white flag when the former tried to pass Byron for the lead. It was the first Daytona 500 win for Hendrick since 2014. After an early crash, the race was clean until the Big One with nine laps to go. 23 cars were involved in that pileup which brought out the red flag.

== Report ==
=== Background ===
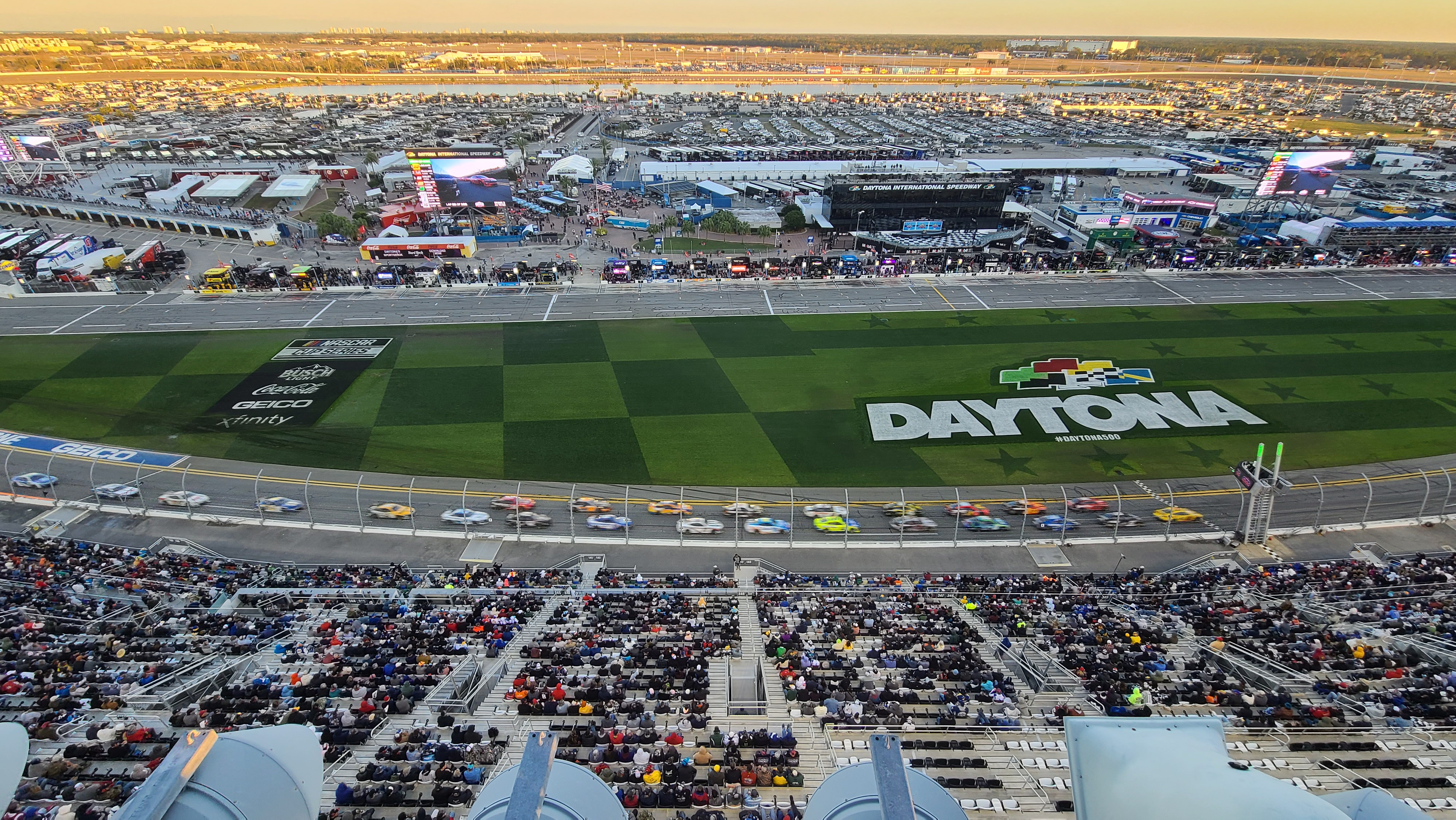
View of cars racing on the front stretch at the 2024 Daytona 500, held at Daytona International Speedway.

Daytona International Speedway is one of three superspeedways to hold NASCAR races, the other two being Atlanta Motor Speedway and Talladega Superspeedway. The standard track at Daytona International Speedway is a four-turn superspeedway that is 2.5 miles (4.0 km) long. The track's turns are banked at 31 degrees, while the front stretch, the location of the finish line, is banked at 18 degrees.

==== Entry list ====
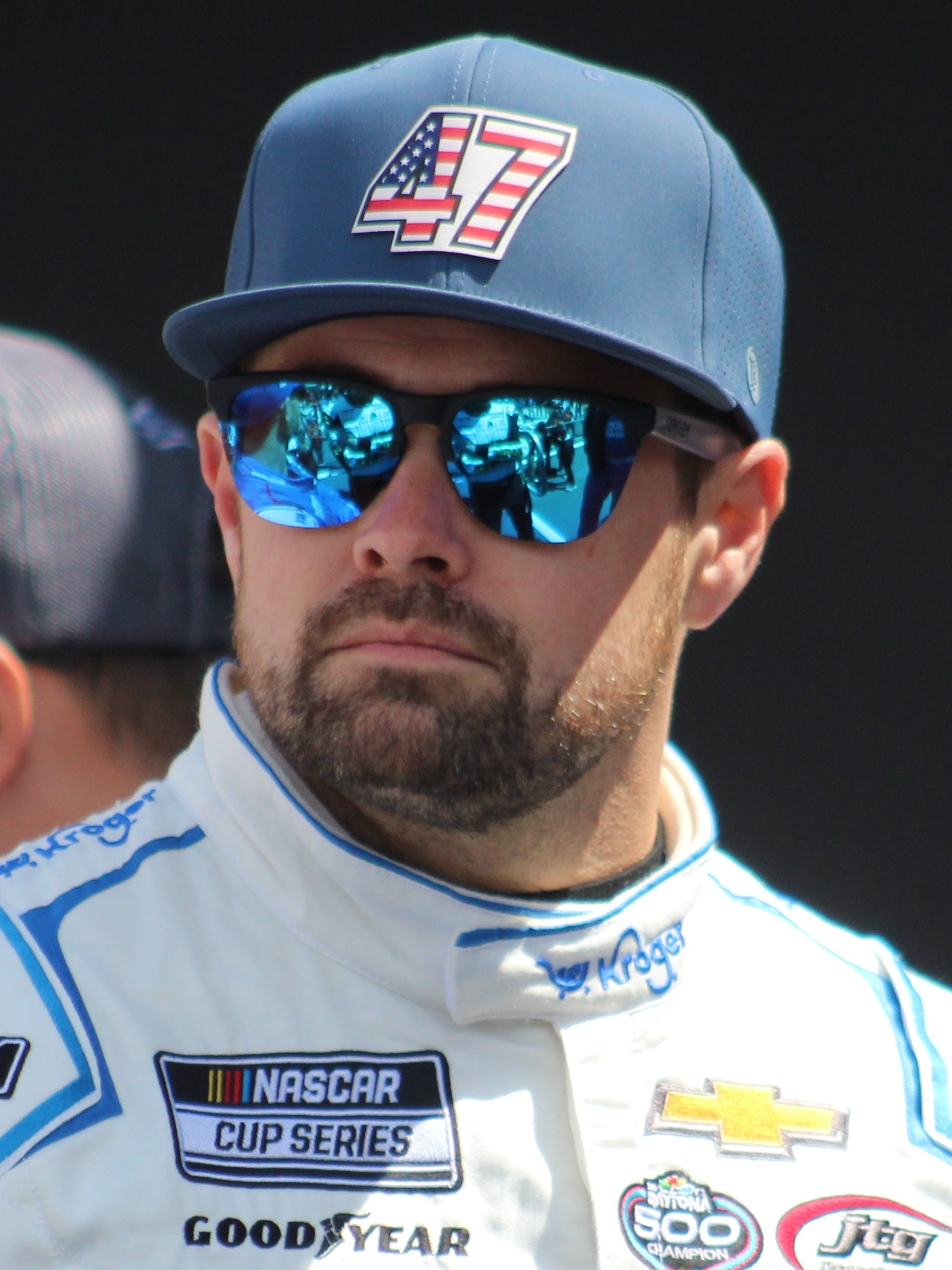
Defending race winner Ricky Stenhouse Jr.

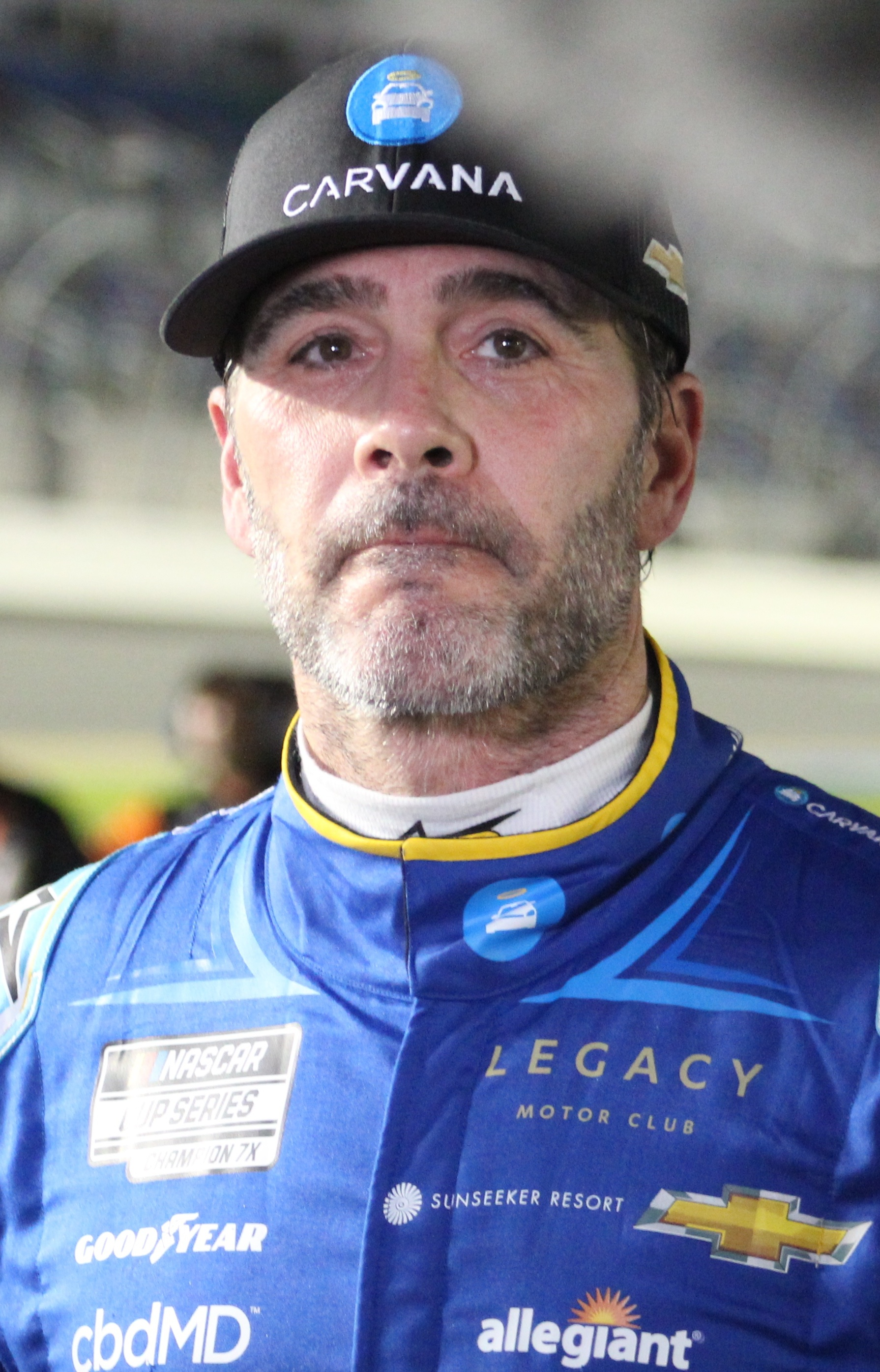
Two-time race winner Jimmie Johnson (2006 & 2013) had the most prior starts of the field with 21.

- (R) denotes rookie driver.
- (W) denotes former winner.
- (i) denotes driver who is ineligible for series driver points.

No.	Driver	Team	Manufacturer
1	Ross Chastain	Trackhouse Racing	Chevrolet
2	Austin Cindric (W)	Team Penske	Ford
3	Austin Dillon (W)	Richard Childress Racing	Chevrolet
4	Josh Berry (R)	Stewart–Haas Racing	Ford
5	Kyle Larson	Hendrick Motorsports	Chevrolet
6	Brad Keselowski	RFK Racing	Ford
7	Corey LaJoie	Spire Motorsports	Chevrolet
8	Kyle Busch	Richard Childress Racing	Chevrolet
9	Chase Elliott	Hendrick Motorsports	Chevrolet
10	Noah Gragson	Stewart–Haas Racing	Ford
11	Denny Hamlin (W)	Joe Gibbs Racing	Toyota
12	Ryan Blaney	Team Penske	Ford
14	Chase Briscoe	Stewart–Haas Racing	Ford
15	Riley Herbst (i)	Rick Ware Racing	Ford
16	A. J. Allmendinger (i)	Kaulig Racing	Chevrolet
17	Chris Buescher	RFK Racing	Ford
19	Martin Truex Jr.	Joe Gibbs Racing	Toyota
20	Christopher Bell	Joe Gibbs Racing	Toyota
21	Harrison Burton	Wood Brothers Racing	Ford
22	Joey Logano (W)	Team Penske	Ford
23	Bubba Wallace	23XI Racing	Toyota
24	William Byron	Hendrick Motorsports	Chevrolet
31	Daniel Hemric	Kaulig Racing	Chevrolet
34	Michael McDowell (W)	Front Row Motorsports	Ford
36	Kaz Grala (R)	Front Row Motorsports	Ford
38	Todd Gilliland	Front Row Motorsports	Ford
41	Ryan Preece	Stewart–Haas Racing	Ford
42	John Hunter Nemechek	Legacy Motor Club	Toyota
43	Erik Jones	Legacy Motor Club	Toyota
44	J. J. Yeley (i)	NY Racing Team	Chevrolet
45	Tyler Reddick	23XI Racing	Toyota
47	Ricky Stenhouse Jr. (W)	JTG Daugherty Racing	Chevrolet
48	Alex Bowman	Hendrick Motorsports	Chevrolet
51	Justin Haley	Rick Ware Racing	Ford
54	Ty Gibbs	Joe Gibbs Racing	Toyota
60	David Ragan	RFK Racing	Ford
62	Anthony Alfredo (i)	Beard Motorsports	Chevrolet
71	Zane Smith (R)	Spire Motorsports	Chevrolet
77	Carson Hocevar (R)	Spire Motorsports	Chevrolet
78	B. J. McLeod (i)	Live Fast Motorsports	Chevrolet
84	Jimmie Johnson (W)	Legacy Motor Club	Toyota
99	Daniel Suárez	Trackhouse Racing	Chevrolet
Official entry list

== Qualifying ==
Joey Logano scored the pole for the race with a time of 49.465 and a speed of 181.947 mph (292.815 km/h). Michael McDowell also qualified second and will appear on the front row for the race. Anthony Alfredo of Beard Motorsports and David Ragan of RFK Racing were the two open cars that qualified for the race via qualifying.

=== Qualifying results ===
Pos	No.	Driver	Team	Manufacturer	R1	R2
1	22	Joey Logano	Team Penske	Ford	49.641	49.465
2	34	Michael McDowell	Front Row Motorsports	Ford	49.783	49.536
3	5	Kyle Larson	Hendrick Motorsports	Chevrolet	49.730	49.550
4	2	Austin Cindric	Team Penske	Ford	49.799	49.667
5	9	Chase Elliott	Hendrick Motorsports	Chevrolet	49.782	49.675
6	24	William Byron	Hendrick Motorsports	Chevrolet	49.776	49.676
7	3	Austin Dillon	Richard Childress Racing	Chevrolet	49.745	49.705
8	8	Kyle Busch	Richard Childress Racing	Chevrolet	49.824	49.725
9	1	Ross Chastain	Trackhouse Racing	Chevrolet	49.837	49.756
10	21	Harrison Burton	Wood Brothers Racing	Ford	49.903	49.909
11	38	Todd Gilliland	Front Row Motorsports	Ford	49.906	—
12	15	Riley Herbst (i)	Rick Ware Racing	Ford	49.946	—
13	41	Ryan Preece	Stewart–Haas Racing	Ford	49.952	—
14	14	Chase Briscoe	Stewart–Haas Racing	Ford	49.966	—
15	17	Chris Buescher	RFK Racing	Ford	49.978	—
16	10	Noah Gragson	Stewart–Haas Racing	Ford	49.979	—
17	48	Alex Bowman	Hendrick Motorsports	Chevrolet	49.996	—
18	12	Ryan Blaney	Team Penske	Ford	50.003	—
19	99	Daniel Suárez	Trackhouse Racing	Chevrolet	50.058	—
20	62	Anthony Alfredo (i)	Beard Motorsports	Chevrolet	50.098	—
21	16	A. J. Allmendinger (i)	Kaulig Racing	Chevrolet	50.101	—
22	43	Erik Jones	Legacy Motor Club	Toyota	50.101	—
23	4	Josh Berry (R)	Stewart–Haas Racing	Ford	50.102	—
24	31	Daniel Hemric	Kaulig Racing	Chevrolet	50.133	—
25	6	Brad Keselowski	RFK Racing	Ford	50.170	—
26	19	Martin Truex Jr.	Joe Gibbs Racing	Toyota	50.177	—
27	60	David Ragan	RFK Racing	Ford	50.200	—
28	23	Bubba Wallace	23XI Racing	Toyota	50.208	—
29	54	Ty Gibbs	Joe Gibbs Racing	Toyota	50.220	—
30	51	Justin Haley	Rick Ware Racing	Ford	50.226	—
31	47	Ricky Stenhouse Jr.	JTG Daugherty Racing	Chevrolet	50.231	—
32	20	Christopher Bell	Joe Gibbs Racing	Toyota	50.251	—
33	7	Corey LaJoie	Spire Motorsports	Chevrolet	50.261	—
34	11	Denny Hamlin	Joe Gibbs Racing	Toyota	50.293	—
35	84	Jimmie Johnson	Legacy Motor Club	Toyota	50.323	—
36	45	Tyler Reddick	23XI Racing	Toyota	50.334	—
37	71	Zane Smith (R)	Spire Motorsports	Chevrolet	50.485	—
38	77	Carson Hocevar (R)	Spire Motorsports	Chevrolet	50.589	—
39	42	John Hunter Nemechek	Legacy Motor Club	Toyota	50.608	—
40	78	B. J. McLeod (i)	Live Fast Motorsports	Chevrolet	50.749	—
41	44	J. J. Yeley (i)	NY Racing Team	Chevrolet	51.261	—
42	36	Kaz Grala (R)	Front Row Motorsports	Ford	DNS	—
Official qualifying results

== Bluegreen Vacations Duel ==
The Bluegreen Vacations Duels are a pair of NASCAR Cup Series races held in conjunction with the Daytona 500 annually in February at Daytona International Speedway. They consist of two races 60 laps and 150 miles (240 km) in length, which serve as heat races that set the lineup for the Daytona 500. Both races sets the lineup for positions 3-38. The first race sets the lineup for cars that qualified in odd–numbered positions on pole qualifying day. The second race sets the lineup for cars that qualified in even–numbered positions. The finishing results for the charter teams, and the highest finishing open team (team without a charter) in each Duel, will be used to set their grid position. Positions 39-40 belong to the two fastest cars that did not qualify among open teams.

=== Duel 1 ===
==== Duel 1 results ====
Pos	Grid	No	Driver	Team	Manufacturer	Laps	Points
1	19	45	Tyler Reddick	23XI Racing	Toyota	60	10
2	3	9	Chase Elliott	Hendrick Motorsports	Chevrolet	60	9
3	9	48	Alex Bowman	Hendrick Motorsports	Chevrolet	60	8
4	20	77	Carson Hocevar (R)	Spire Motorsports	Chevrolet	60	7
5	12	43	Erik Jones	Legacy Motor Club	Toyota	60	6
6	10	99	Daniel Suárez	Trackhouse Racing	Chevrolet	60	5
7	1	22	Joey Logano	Team Penske	Ford	60	4
8	15	54	Ty Gibbs	Joe Gibbs Racing	Toyota	60	3
9	2	5	Kyle Larson	Hendrick Motorsports	Chevrolet	60	2
10	8	17	Chris Buescher	RFK Racing	Ford	60	1
11	5	1	Ross Chastain	Trackhouse Racing	Chevrolet	60	0
12	18	84	Jimmie Johnson	Legacy Motor Club	Toyota	60	0
13	7	41	Ryan Preece	Stewart–Haas Racing	Ford	60	0
14	14	19	Martin Truex Jr.	Joe Gibbs Racing	Toyota	60	0
15	17	7	Corey LaJoie	Spire Motorsports	Chevrolet	60	0
16	21	44	J. J. Yeley (i)	NY Racing Team	Chevrolet	60	0
17	6	38	Todd Gilliland	Front Row Motorsports	Ford	60	0
18	4	3	Austin Dillon	Richard Childress Racing	Chevrolet	60	0
19	11	62	Anthony Alfredo (i)	Beard Motorsports	Chevrolet	59	0
20	16	47	Ricky Stenhouse Jr.	JTG Daugherty Racing	Chevrolet	51	0
21	13	31	Daniel Hemric	Kaulig Racing	Chevrolet	49	0
Official race results

=== Duel 2 ===
==== Duel 2 results ====
Pos	Grid	No	Driver	Team	Manufacturer	Laps	Points
1	16	20	Christopher Bell	Joe Gibbs Racing	Toyota	60	10
2	2	2	Austin Cindric	Team Penske	Ford	60	9
3	17	11	Denny Hamlin	Joe Gibbs Racing	Toyota	60	8
4	19	42	John Hunter Nemechek	Legacy Motor Club	Toyota	60	7
5	5	21	Harrison Burton	Wood Brothers Racing	Ford	60	6
6	18	71	Zane Smith (R)	Spire Motorsports	Chevrolet	60	5
7	12	6	Brad Keselowski	RFK Racing	Ford	60	4
8	3	24	William Byron	Hendrick Motorsports	Chevrolet	60	3
9	7	14	Chase Briscoe	Stewart–Haas Racing	Ford	60	2
10	15	51	Justin Haley	Rick Ware Racing	Ford	60	1
11	14	23	Bubba Wallace	23XI Racing	Toyota	60	0
12	21	36	Kaz Grala (R)	Front Row Motorsports	Ford	60	0
13	10	16	A. J. Allmendinger (i)	Kaulig Racing	Chevrolet	60	0
14	20	78	B. J. McLeod (i)	Live Fast Motorsports	Chevrolet	60	0
15	13	60	David Ragan	RFK Racing	Ford	60	0
16	1	34	Michael McDowell	Front Row Motorsports	Ford	60	0
17	11	4	Josh Berry (R)	Stewart–Haas Racing	Ford	48	0
18	9	12	Ryan Blaney	Team Penske	Ford	47	0
19	4	8	Kyle Busch	Richard Childress Racing	Chevrolet	47	0
20	6	15	Riley Herbst (i)	Rick Ware Racing	Ford	47	0
21	8	10	Noah Gragson	Stewart–Haas Racing	Ford	47	0
Official race results

=== Starting lineup ===
Pos	No.	Driver	Team	Manufacturer	Notes
1	22	Joey Logano	Team Penske	Ford	Fastest in pole qualifying
2	34	Michael McDowell	Front Row Motorsports	Ford	Second in pole qualifying
3	45	Tyler Reddick	23XI Racing	Toyota	Duel 1 Winner
4	20	Christopher Bell	Joe Gibbs Racing	Toyota	Duel 2 Winner
5	9	Chase Elliott	Hendrick Motorsports	Chevrolet	Second in Duel 1
6	2	Austin Cindric	Team Penske	Ford	Second in Duel 2
7	48	Alex Bowman	Hendrick Motorsports	Chevrolet	Third in Duel 1
8	11	Denny Hamlin	Joe Gibbs Racing	Toyota	Third in Duel 2
9	77	Carson Hocevar (R)	Spire Motorsports	Chevrolet	Fourth in Duel 1
10	42	John Hunter Nemechek	Legacy Motor Club	Toyota	Fourth in Duel 2
11	43	Erik Jones	Legacy Motor Club	Toyota	Fifth in Duel 1
12	21	Harrison Burton	Wood Brothers Racing	Ford	Fifth in Duel 2
13	99	Daniel Suárez	Trackhouse Racing	Chevrolet	Sixth in Duel 1
14	71	Zane Smith (R)	Spire Motorsports	Chevrolet	Sixth in Duel 2
15	54	Ty Gibbs	Joe Gibbs Racing	Toyota	Eighth in Duel 1
16	6	Brad Keselowski	RFK Racing	Ford	Seventh in Duel 2
17	5	Kyle Larson	Hendrick Motorsports	Chevrolet	Ninth in Duel 1
18	24	William Byron	Hendrick Motorsports	Chevrolet	Eighth in Duel 2
19	17	Chris Buescher	RFK Racing	Ford	Tenth in Duel 1
20	14	Chase Briscoe	Stewart–Haas Racing	Ford	Ninth in Duel 2
21	1	Ross Chastain	Trackhouse Racing	Chevrolet	Eleventh in Duel 1
22	51	Justin Haley	Rick Ware Racing	Ford	Tenth in Duel 2
23	84	Jimmie Johnson	Legacy Motor Club	Toyota	Twelfth in Duel 1
24	23	Bubba Wallace	23XI Racing	Toyota	Eleventh in Duel 2
25	41	Ryan Preece	Stewart–Haas Racing	Ford	Thirteenth in Duel 1
26	36	Kaz Grala (R)	Front Row Motorsports	Ford	Twelfth in Duel 2
27	19	Martin Truex Jr.	Joe Gibbs Racing	Toyota	Fourteenth in Duel 1
28	16	A. J. Allmendinger (i)	Kaulig Racing	Chevrolet	Thirteenth in Duel 2
29	7	Corey LaJoie	Spire Motorsports	Chevrolet	Fifteenth in Duel 1
30	4	Josh Berry (R)	Stewart–Haas Racing	Ford	Seventeenth in Duel 2
31	38	Todd Gilliland	Front Row Motorsports	Ford	Seventeenth in Duel 1
32	12	Ryan Blaney	Team Penske	Ford	Eighteenth in Duel 2
33	3	Austin Dillon	Richard Childress Racing	Chevrolet	Eighteenth in Duel 1
34	8	Kyle Busch	Richard Childress Racing	Chevrolet	Nineteenth in Duel 2
35	47	Ricky Stenhouse Jr.	JTG Daugherty Racing	Chevrolet	20th in Duel 1
36	15	Riley Herbst (i)	Rick Ware Racing	Ford	20th in Duel 2
37	31	Daniel Hemric	Kaulig Racing	Chevrolet	21st in Duel 1
38	10	Noah Gragson	Stewart–Haas Racing	Ford	21st in Duel 2
39	62	Anthony Alfredo (i)	Beard Motorsports	Chevrolet	Qualifying Speed
40	60	David Ragan	RFK Racing	Ford	Qualifying Speed
Did not qualify
41	78	B. J. McLeod (i)	Live Fast Motorsports	Chevrolet	
42	44	J. J. Yeley (i)	NY Racing Team	Chevrolet	
Official starting lineup

== Practice ==
=== First practice ===
Denny Hamlin was the fastest in the first practice session with a time of 45.575 seconds and a speed of 197.477 mph (317.808 km/h).

Pos	No.	Driver	Team	Manufacturer	Time	Speed
1	11	Denny Hamlin	Joe Gibbs Racing	Toyota	45.575	197.477
2	43	Erik Jones	Legacy Motor Club	Toyota	45.577	197.468
3	20	Christopher Bell	Joe Gibbs Racing	Toyota	45.586	197.429
Official first practice results

=== Final practice ===
Final practice was canceled due to weather conditions.

== Race ==
=== Stage 1 ===
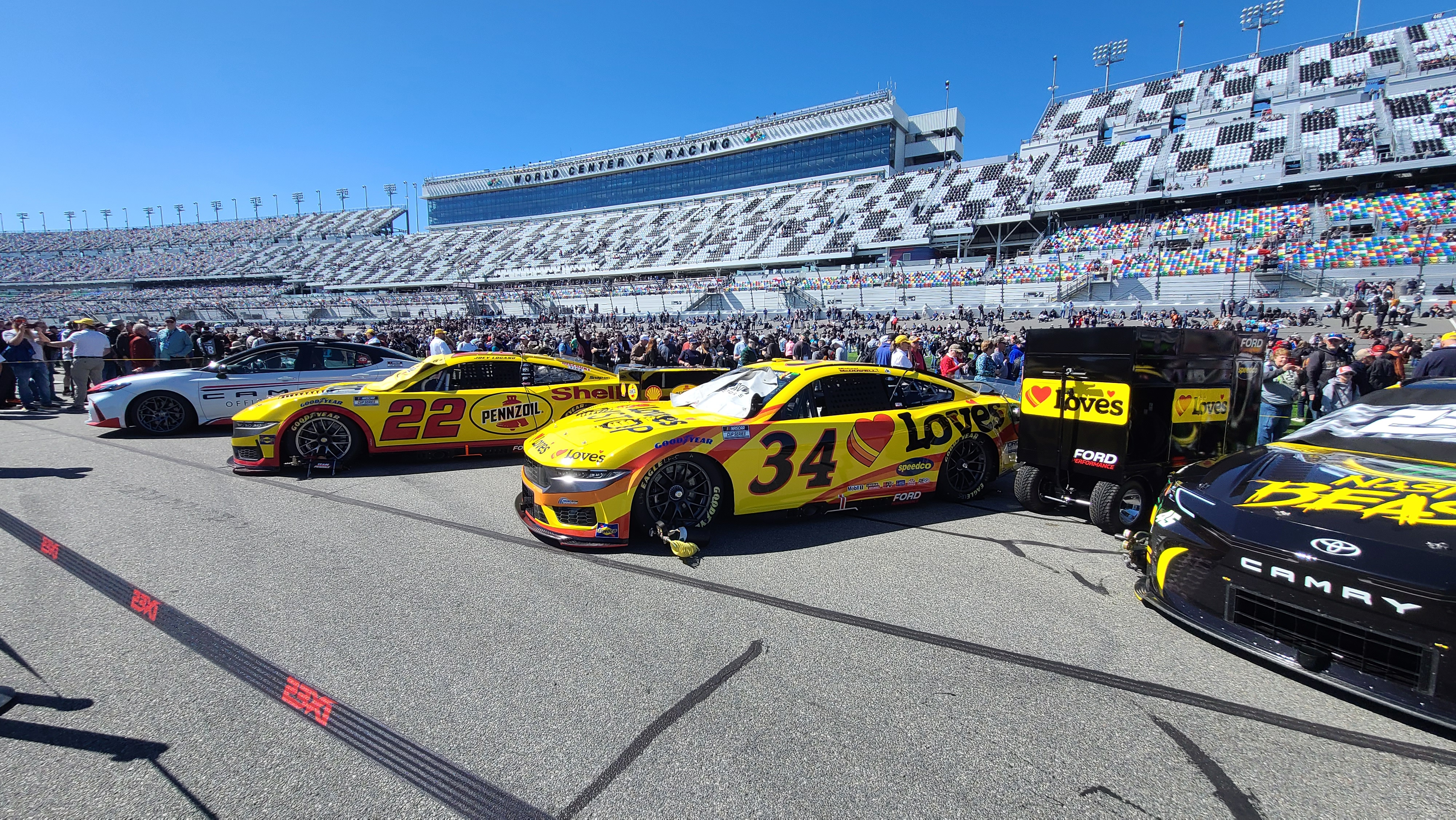
Cars lined-up on Pit Road, prepared for the 2024 Daytona 500. From left, the Toyota Pace Car, Joey Logano's #22 Ford, Michael McDowell's #34 Ford, and Tyler Reddick's #45 Toyota with the Grandstand in the background.

Pole sitter Joey Logano led the first lap of the race as he and Michael McDowell were side by side. McDowell led lap 2, Logano led lap 3, and McDowell led lap 4 before Logano got in front of McDowell on lap 5. At the same time, the first caution flew for a multi car crash through the tri-oval. It started when John Hunter Nemechek was getting pushed by Brad Keselowski when Keselowski hit Nemechek at the wrong angle and turned Nemechek down into Harrison Burton. Burton spun down right in front of Carson Hocevar and both Burton and Hocevar spun in the wet infield grass. They both then spun back up where Burton came up right in front of Ryan Preece, Kaz Grala, and Austin Dillon while Hocevar spun up in front of Jimmie Johnson. Grala, Burton, and Hocevar's races all came to an end. Many cars including Joey Logano decided to pit for fuel but Christopher Bell, Ryan Blaney, and Daniel Hemric did not pit and Bell led the field to the restart on lap 12. Bell and Blaney were side by side for the lead for multiple laps with Bell leading all of them until lap 31 when Blaney would get in front of Bell and took the lead. On lap 40, Joey Logano took the lead. On the same lap, Logano and some others pitted giving the lead to Michael McDowell. On lap 42, Chase Elliott attempted to take the lead but failed to get in front of McDowell. Elliott tried again on lap 43 and was able to get in front of McDowell on lap 44. But on that same lap, Josh Berry took the lead. Elliott would take it back a lap later. Elliott and others would pit on lap 55 giving the lead to Bubba Wallace. Wallace would pit on lap 56 giving the lead to Noah Gragson. Gragson would pit on lap 60 giving the lead to David Ragan. Both Ragan and Ryan Preece stayed out and ended up losing the lead to the faster oncoming pack led by Kyle Busch and Busch took the lead on lap 63. On the last lap of stage 1 on lap 65, Chase Elliott took the lead. Elliott would hold on and win stage 1.

=== Stage 2 ===
Kyle Larson won the race off of pit road and he led the field to the restart on lap 71. On lap 72, Larson was racing with Josh Berry for the lead when a third line led by Joey Logano went by them and Logano took the lead. On lap 85, Todd Gilliland raced side by side with Logano for the lead until lap 87 and couldn't take the lead. Gilliland would take the lead from Logano on lap 93. Martin Truex Jr. attempted to take the lead on lap 95 but failed to get in front of Gilliland. On lap 109, Bubba Wallace took the lead but got passed by Kyle Busch on the same lap and Busch took the lead. Ryan Preece took the lead on lap 111 but immeadietly went to pit and gave the lead back to Busch. During that pair of pitstops, Josh Berry got turned into his pit box by John Hunter Nemechek. Busch and others would pit on lap 114 giving the lead to Kyle Larson. Larson and others would pit on lap 115 and would hold on to the lead with the big gap the pack he was in had. On lap 118, Austin Cindric took the lead. Larson took the lead on lap 120 but was immeadietly passed by Cindric. Kyle Busch got side by side with Cindric on lap 121 and Busch led lap 123 but Cindric took it back. Busch would lead lap 129. On the last lap of stage 2 on lap 130, Cindric took the lead but his teammate Ryan Blaney took the lead from Cindric in turns 3 and 4 and Blaney would win stage 2.

=== Final stage ===
During pit stops, Kyle Busch's left front wheel was not secured when he left his pit box. Fortunately, the wheel did not fall off and Busch was able to make it back to pit road to get it secured. Austin Cindric won the race off of pit road and he led the field to the restart on lap 137. Both Cindric and Bubba Wallace ran side by side with Wallace leading lap 137, Cindric leading lap 138, and Wallace leading lap 139. The racing began to intensify during this span. On lap 140, A. J. Allmendinger took the lead from Cindric and Wallace. Both Tyler Reddick and Chris Buescher attempted to take the lead from Allmendinger on the same lap but failed to get in front of him. On lap 148, Corey LaJoie took the lead but Allmendinger led that lap. LaJoie got in front again on lap 149 but was passed by Kyle Busch to the line and Busch took the lead. LaJoie would take the lead with 50 laps to go. With 49 to go, Denny Hamlin took the lead. Busch would lead with 48 to go before Hamlin took the lead the following lap. With 39 to go, Busch went to get in line behind Corey LaJoie off of turn 2 but smacked the wall in the process but did not lose a lot of momentum. With 38 laps to go, Joey Logano took the lead from Hamlin. With 30 to go, Hamlin got in front of Logano but was passed immeadietly by Logano.

On Lap 178, the final scheduled pit stops (all under the green flag) took place. With the way pit stops take place on superspeedways, the teams typically pitted by manufacturer. Toyota teams primarily pitted on Lap 178, but Denny Hamlin was unable to make the commitment. On Lap 179, Hamlin, Justin Haley, and Kyle Busch pitted (three different manufacturers) as a trio. Ford teams pitted on Lap 181, including Logano's, which gave the lead to Ross Chastain's Chevrolet. Chastain led a group of Chevrolet teams in the final pit stop on Lap 182, and with a stronger pack, maintained the lead. After the three packs merged, the intensity of the racing picked up, and the bump drafting tactics became "slam drafting," creating serious pushes to create momentum. On Lap 186, defending champion Ricky Stenhouse Jr. took the lead but was passed by Daniel Suárez, who took the lead. With 13 to go, William Byron attempted to take the lead but Ross Chastain made a 3 wide pass and Chastain took the lead with 13 to go. With 11 to go, Joey Logano attempted to take the lead but failed to get in front of Chastain.

On Lap 192, the aggressive racing picked up on the backstretch. Keselowski and Logano were on the outside attempting to slingshot past Chastain for the lead. As Chastain made an aggressive block, Keselowski stayed behind him while Logano stayed outside. It created a third lane in the middle where William Byron and Alex Bowman were located, with Bowman pushing Byron. The overaggressive push sent Byron into Keselowski on the inside, turning Keselowski in front of the entire pack, the fourth caution of the night and the first for incident since Lap 5. The wreck collected 23 cars and involved Austin Cindric, Kyle Larson, Brad Keselowski, Chase Elliott, Noah Gragson, Denny Hamlin, Ryan Blaney, Chase Briscoe, Chris Buescher, Martin Truex Jr., Christopher Bell, Joey Logano, William Byron, Daniel Hemric, Todd Gilliland, Ryan Preece, Erik Jones, Tyler Reddick, Ricky Stenhouse Jr., Alex Bowman, Ty Gibbs, Anthony Alfredo, and Daniel Suárez. The red flag flew for the mess which lasted for 15 minutes and 27 seconds before it was lifted. The race would restart with 4 laps to go with Chastain leading. Both William Byron and Ross Chastain fought hard side by side for the lead with Byron leading the laps until with 2 to go when Chastain fell back. With 2 to go off of turn 4, Chastain had a big run on Byron and went to the inside of Byron to take the lead coming to the tri-oval. Byron makes a block moving to the outside. Chastain turns down in front of Austin Cindric, with both spinning through the tri-oval while the track was still under green, with NASCAR hoping both cars will straighten up and let the race finish. Byron then crosses the start-finish line to start Lap 200, signaling the race will conclude at the end of the lap. Cindric slides up and NASCAR presses the button to signal the fifth caution period, which ends the race. William Byron and Alex Bowman were side by side when the caution was signaled, meaning NASCAR would use instant replay review to determine the leader at the time of the caution period was started. Two minutes later, NASCAR declared William Byron the winner and Bowman finished in second. This was the first time the No. 24 has been in victory lane in the Daytona 500 since Jeff Gordon in 2005. The win was also a special moment for Hendrick Motorsports as it was 40 years ago to the date Hendrick Motorsports ran its first ever race in NASCAR at the 1984 Daytona 500. Christopher Bell, Corey LaJoie, and Bubba Wallace rounded out the top 5 while A. J. Allmendinger, John Hunter Nemechek, Erik Jones, Noah Gragson, and Chase Briscoe rounded out the top 10.

== Race results ==
=== Stage Results ===
Stage One Laps: 65

Pos	No	Driver	Team	Manufacturer	Points
1	9	Chase Elliott	Hendrick Motorsports	Chevrolet	10
2	5	Kyle Larson	Hendrick Motorsports	Chevrolet	9
3	1	Ross Chastain	Trackhouse Racing	Chevrolet	8
4	48	Alex Bowman	Hendrick Motorsports	Chevrolet	7
5	24	William Byron	Hendrick Motorsports	Chevrolet	6
6	8	Kyle Busch	Richard Childress Racing	Chevrolet	5
7	11	Denny Hamlin	Joe Gibbs Racing	Toyota	4
8	23	Bubba Wallace	23XI Racing	Toyota	3
9	19	Martin Truex Jr.	Joe Gibbs Racing	Toyota	2
10	99	Daniel Suárez	Trackhouse Racing	Chevrolet	1
Official stage one results

Stage Two Laps: 65

Pos	No	Driver	Team	Manufacturer	Points
1	12	Ryan Blaney	Team Penske	Ford	10
2	2	Austin Cindric	Team Penske	Ford	9
3	99	Daniel Suárez	Trackhouse Racing	Chevrolet	8
4	8	Kyle Busch	Richard Chilrdress Racing	Chevrolet	7
5	45	Tyler Reddick	23XI Racing	Toyota	6
6	24	William Byron	Hendrick Motorsports	Chevrolet	5
7	23	Bubba Wallace	23XI Racing	Toyota	4
8	47	Ricky Stenhouse Jr.	JTG Daugherty Racing	Chevrolet	3
9	16	A. J. Allmendinger (i)	Kaulig Racing	Chevrolet	0
10	17	Chris Buescher	RFK Racing	Ford	1
Official stage two results

=== Final Stage Results ===
Stage Three Laps: 70

Pos	Grid	No	Driver	Team	Manufacturer	Laps	Points
1	18	24	William Byron	Hendrick Motorsports	Chevrolet	200	51
2	7	48	Alex Bowman	Hendrick Motorsports	Chevrolet	200	42
3	4	20	Christopher Bell	Joe Gibbs Racing	Toyota	200	34
4	29	7	Corey LaJoie	Spire Motorsports	Chevrolet	200	33
5	24	23	Bubba Wallace	23XI Racing	Toyota	200	39
6	28	16	A. J. Allmendinger (i)	Kaulig Racing	Chevrolet	200	0
7	10	42	John Hunter Nemechek	Legacy Motor Club	Toyota	200	30
8	11	43	Erik Jones	Legacy Motor Club	Toyota	200	29
9	38	10	Noah Gragson	Stewart–Haas Racing	Ford	200	28
10	20	14	Chase Briscoe	Stewart–Haas Racing	Ford	200	27
11	17	5	Kyle Larson	Hendrick Motorsports	Chevrolet	200	35
12	34	8	Kyle Busch	Richard Childress Racing	Chevrolet	200	37
13	14	71	Zane Smith (R)	Spire Motorsports	Chevrolet	200	24
14	5	9	Chase Elliott	Hendrick Motorsports	Chevrolet	200	33
15	27	19	Martin Truex Jr.	Joe Gibbs Racing	Toyota	200	24
16	37	31	Daniel Hemric	Kaulig Racing	Chevrolet	200	21
17	15	54	Ty Gibbs	Joe Gibbs Racing	Toyota	200	20
18	19	17	Chris Buescher	RFK Racing	Ford	200	20
19	8	11	Denny Hamlin	Joe Gibbs Racing	Toyota	200	22
20	40	60	David Ragan	RFK Racing	Ford	200	17
21	21	1	Ross Chastain	Trackhouse Racing	Chevrolet	200	24
22	6	2	Austin Cindric	Team Penske	Ford	200	24
23	25	41	Ryan Preece	Stewart–Haas Racing	Ford	199	14
24	36	15	Riley Herbst (i)	Rick Ware Racing	Ford	199	0
25	30	4	Josh Berry (R)	Stewart–Haas Racing	Ford	199	12
26	22	51	Justin Haley	Rick Ware Racing	Ford	199	11
27	39	62	Anthony Alfredo (i)	Beard Motorsports	Chevrolet	198	0
28	23	84	Jimmie Johnson	Legacy Motor Club	Toyota	196	9
29	3	45	Tyler Reddick	23XI Racing	Toyota	192	14
30	32	12	Ryan Blaney	Team Penske	Ford	192	17
31	35	47	Ricky Stenhouse Jr.	JTG Daugherty Racing	Chevrolet	192	9
32	1	22	Joey Logano	Team Penske	Ford	191	5
33	16	6	Brad Keselowski	RFK Racing	Ford	191	4
34	13	99	Daniel Suárez	Trackhouse Racing	Chevrolet	191	12
35	31	38	Todd Gilliland	Front Row Motorsports	Ford	191	2
36	2	34	Michael McDowell	Front Row Motorsports	Ford	176	1
37	33	3	Austin Dillon	Richard Childress Racing	Chevrolet	146	1
38	26	36	Kaz Grala (R)	Front Row Motorsports	Ford	5	1
39	12	21	Harrison Burton	Wood Brothers Racing	Ford	5	1
40	9	77	Carson Hocevar (R)	Spire Motorsports	Chevrolet	5	1
Official race results

=== Race statistics ===
- Lead changes: 41 among 20 different drivers
- Cautions/Laps: 5 for 18 laps
- Red flags: 1 for 15 minutes and 27 seconds
- Time of race: 3 hours, 10 minutes and 52 seconds
- Average speed: 157.178 miles per hour (252.953 km/h)

== Media ==
=== Television ===
Since 2001—with the exception of 2002, 2004, and 2006—the Daytona 500 has been carried by Fox in the United States. The booth crew consisted of longtime NASCAR lap-by-lap announcer Mike Joy, Clint Bowyer, and 2007 Daytona 500 winner Kevin Harvick. Jamie Little, Regan Smith, and Josh Sims handled pit road for the television side. 1992 and 1998 Daytona 500 winning crew chief Larry McReynolds provided insight on-site during the race.

Fox Television
Booth announcers	Pit reporters	In-race analyst
Lap-by-lap: Mike Joy; Color-commentator: Clint Bowyer; Color-commentator: Kevin Harvick	Jamie Little; Regan Smith; Josh Sims	Larry McReynolds

In Canada, it aired on CTV Television Network for the first time since 1996.

=== Radio ===
The race was broadcast on radio by the Motor Racing Network who have covered the Daytona 500 since 1970—and simulcast on Sirius XM NASCAR Radio. The booth crew consisted of Alex Hayden, Jeff Striegle, and 1989 Cup Series champion Rusty Wallace. A special guest, Doug Rice, was also briefly part of the broadcast booth to commemorate his final year working for the Performance Racing Network, and call play-by-play for a few laps. Longtime turn announcer Dave Moody was the lead turn announcer, calling the race from atop the Sunoco tower outside the exit of turn 2 when the field races through turns 1 and 2. Mike Bagley worked the backstretch for the race from a spotter's stand on the inside of the track & Dillon Welch called the race when the field races through turns 3 and 4 from the Sunoco tower outside the exit of turn 4. On pit road, MRN was operated by Steve Post, Kim Coon, Brienne Pedigo and Jason Toy.

MRN Radio
Booth announcers	Turn announcers	Pit reporters
Lead announcer: Alex Hayden; Announcer: Jeff Striegle; Announcer: Rusty Wallace	Turns 1 & 2: Dave Moody; Backstretch: Mike Bagley; Turns 3 & 4: Dillon Welch	Steve Post; Kim Coon; Brienne Pedigo; Jason Toy

== Standings after the race ==
Drivers' Championship standings

Pos	Driver	Points
1	William Byron	54
2	Alex Bowman	50 (–4)
3	Christopher Bell	44 (–10)
4	Chase Elliott	42 (–12)
5	Bubba Wallace	38 (–16)
6	John Hunter Nemechek	37 (–17)
7	Kyle Busch	37 (–17)
8	Kyle Larson	37 (–17)
9	Erik Jones	34 (–20)
10	Corey LaJoie	33 (–21)
11	Austin Cindric	33 (–21)
12	Denny Hamlin	30 (–24)
13	Chase Briscoe	29 (–25)
14	Zane Smith (R)	29 (–25)
15	Noah Gragson	28 (–26)
16	Martin Truex Jr.	24 (–30)
Official driver's standings

Manufacturers' Championship standings

Pos	Manufacturer	Points
1	Chevrolet	40
2	Toyota	34 (–6)
3	Ford	28 (–12)

- Note: Only the first 16 positions are included for the driver standings.

Previous race: 2023 NASCAR Cup Series Championship Race	NASCAR Cup Series; 2024 season	Next race: 2024 Ambetter Health 400
