= Rowdy =

Rowdy may refer to:

== Places ==
- Rowdy Branch, a stream in Kentucky

== People ==
- Rowdy (Medal of Honor recipient), Native American member of the United States Army during the Indian Wars

=== Nicknames ===
- Dale Shearer (born 1965), Australian rugby league footballer
- Kyle Busch (1985–2026), American NASCAR driver
- Rowdy Gaines (born 1959, birth name Ambrose Gaines IV), American swimmer
- Roddy Piper (1954–2015), Canadian professional wrestler
- Ronda Rousey (born 1987), American mixed martial artist
- Rowdy Tellez (born 1995), American baseball player

=== Characters ===
- Rowdy (Dallas Cowboys), the mascot of the Dallas Cowboys NFL franchise
- Rowdy the Roadrunner, the mascot of the University of Texas at San Antonio Roadrunners

=== Fictional characters ===
- Rowdy, stuffed Labrador dog from Scrubs
- Rowdy Abilene, Ronn Moss's character from the 1987 filme Hard Ticket to Hawaii
- Rowdy Burns, Michael Rooker's character from the 1990 film Days of Thunder
- Rowdy Yates, Clint Eastwood's character in Rawhide

== Music ==
- Rowdy (Hank Williams Jr. album), 1981
- Rowdy (Steve Forde album), 2006
- Rowdy Records, a record label

== Film ==
- Rowdy (2014 film), a Tollywood film starring Mohan Babu and Manchu Vishnuvardhan Babu
- Rowdy (2022 film), an American documentary about NASCAR driver Kyle Busch

== See also ==
- The Rowdyman, a 1972 Canadian comedy film
