= 2017 Monster Energy NASCAR All-Star Race =

33rd iteration of the NASCAR All-Star Race

Race details
- Date: May 20, 2017
- Location: Charlotte Motor Speedway in Concord, North Carolina
- Course: Permanent racing facility 1.5 mi (2.4 km)
- Distance: Open: 50 laps, 75 mi (121 km); All-Star Race: 70 laps, 105 mi (169 km)
- Avg Speed: Open: 74.606 mph (120.067 km/h); All-Star Race: 86.558 mph (139.302 km/h)

Monster Energy Open
- Pole: Clint Bowyer (Stewart–Haas Racing)
- Time: 28.500
- Winner (segment 1): Clint Bowyer (Stewart–Haas Racing)
- Winner (segment 2): Ryan Blaney (Wood Brothers Racing)
- Winner (segment 3): Daniel Suárez (Joe Gibbs Racing)
- Fan Vote winners: Chase Elliott (Hendrick Motorsports)

Monster Energy NASCAR All-Star Race
- Pole: Kyle Larson (Chip Ganassi Racing)
- Time: 112.626
- Most laps led: Kyle Larson (Chip Ganassi Racing)
- Laps led: 40
- Winner: Kyle Busch (Joe Gibbs Racing)

Television
- Network: FS1
- Announcers: Mike Joy, Jeff Gordon and Darrell Waltrip

Radio
- Network: Motor Racing Network
- Announcers: Joe Moore, Jeff Striegle and Rusty Wallace (Booth); Dave Moody (1 & 2); Kyle Rickey (3 & 4) (Turns)

The 2017 Monster Energy NASCAR All-Star Race (XXXIII) is a Monster Energy NASCAR Cup Series stock car exhibition race held on May 20, 2017 at Charlotte Motor Speedway in Concord, North Carolina. Contested over 70 laps, it was the second exhibition race of the 2017 Monster Energy NASCAR Cup Series season.

This is the first NASCAR All-Star race without Tony Stewart since 1998, Greg Biffle since 2003 and Carl Edwards since 2004.

== Report ==
=== Background ===
Charlotte Motor Speedway, the track where the race was held.

The All-Star Race was open to race winners from last season through the 2017 Go Bowling 400 at Kansas Speedway and all previous All-Star race winners and Monster Race NASCAR Cup champions who had attempted to qualify for every race in 2017 were eligible to compete in the All-Star Race.

==== Entry list ====
===== Monster Energy Open =====
No.	Driver	Team	Manufacturer
3	Austin Dillon	Richard Childress Racing	Chevrolet
6	Trevor Bayne	Roush Fenway Racing	Ford
10	Danica Patrick	Stewart–Haas Racing	Ford
13	Ty Dillon (R)	Germain Racing	Chevrolet
14	Clint Bowyer	Stewart–Haas Racing	Ford
15	Reed Sorenson	Premium Motorsports	Chevrolet
19	Daniel Suárez (R)	Joe Gibbs Racing	Toyota
21	Ryan Blaney	Wood Brothers Racing	Ford
23	Gray Gaulding (R)	BK Racing	Toyota
24	Chase Elliott	Hendrick Motorsports	Chevrolet
27	Paul Menard	Richard Childress Racing	Chevrolet
32	Matt DiBenedetto	Go Fas Racing	Ford
33	Jeffrey Earnhardt	Circle Sport – The Motorsports Group	Chevrolet
34	Landon Cassill	Front Row Motorsports	Ford
38	David Ragan	Front Row Motorsports	Ford
43	Regan Smith (i)	Richard Petty Motorsports	Ford
47	A. J. Allmendinger	JTG Daugherty Racing	Chevrolet
51	Cody Ware	Rick Ware Racing	Chevrolet
55	Derrike Cope	Premium Motorsports	Toyota
66	Carl Long (i)	MBM Motorsports	Chevrolet
72	Cole Whitt	TriStar Motorsports	Chevrolet
77	Erik Jones (R)	Furniture Row Racing	Toyota
83	Corey LaJoie (R)	BK Racing	Toyota
95	Michael McDowell	Leavine Family Racing	Chevrolet
Official Monster Energy Open entry list

===== Monster Energy NASCAR All-Star Race =====
No.	Driver	Team	Manufacturer
1	Jamie McMurray	Chip Ganassi Racing	Chevrolet
2	Brad Keselowski	Team Penske	Ford
4	Kevin Harvick	Stewart–Haas Racing	Ford
5	Kasey Kahne	Hendrick Motorsports	Chevrolet
11	Denny Hamlin	Joe Gibbs Racing	Toyota
17	Ricky Stenhouse Jr.	Roush Fenway Racing	Ford
18	Kyle Busch	Joe Gibbs Racing	Toyota
20	Matt Kenseth	Joe Gibbs Racing	Toyota
22	Joey Logano	Team Penske	Ford
31	Ryan Newman	Richard Childress Racing	Chevrolet
37	Chris Buescher	JTG Daugherty Racing	Chevrolet
41	Kurt Busch	Stewart–Haas Racing	Ford
42	Kyle Larson	Chip Ganassi Racing	Chevrolet
48	Jimmie Johnson	Hendrick Motorsports	Chevrolet
78	Martin Truex Jr.	Furniture Row Racing	Toyota
88	Dale Earnhardt Jr.	Hendrick Motorsports	Chevrolet
Official Monster Energy NASCAR All-Star Race entry list

== Practice ==
=== All-Star Race practice ===
Kyle Larson was the fastest in the All-Star Race practice session with a time of 28.530 seconds and a speed of 189.274 mph (304.607 km/h).

Pos	No.	Driver	Team	Manufacturer	Time	Speed
1	42	Kyle Larson	Chip Ganassi Racing	Chevrolet	28.530	189.274
2	4	Kevin Harvick	Stewart–Haas Racing	Ford	28.557	189.095
3	2	Brad Keselowski	Team Penske	Ford	28.575	188.976
Official Monster Energy NASCAR All-Star Race practice results

=== Monster Energy Open practice ===
Erik Jones was the fastest in the Monster Energy Open practice session with a time of 28.563 seconds and a speed of 189.056 mph (304.256 km/h).

Pos	No.	Driver	Team	Manufacturer	Time	Speed
1	77	Erik Jones (R)	Furniture Row Racing	Toyota	28.563	189.056
2	14	Clint Bowyer	Stewart–Haas Racing	Ford	28.728	187.970
3	24	Chase Elliott	Hendrick Motorsports	Chevrolet	28.970	186.400
Official Monster Energy Open practice results

== Qualifying (All-Star Race) ==
Kyle Larson scored the pole for the race with a time of 112.626 and a speed of 143.839 mph (231.486 km/h).

=== All-Star Race qualifying results ===
Pos	No.	Driver	Team	Manufacturer	R1	R2
1	42	Kyle Larson	Chip Ganassi Racing	Chevrolet	113.087	112.626
2	18	Kyle Busch	Joe Gibbs Racing	Toyota	112.852	112.636
3	4	Kevin Harvick	Stewart–Haas Racing	Ford	112.256	112.889
4	48	Jimmie Johnson	Hendrick Motorsports	Chevrolet	112.855	121.692
5	41	Kurt Busch	Stewart–Haas Racing	Ford	112.467	122.077
6	88	Dale Earnhardt Jr.	Hendrick Motorsports	Chevrolet	113.179	—
7	2	Brad Keselowski	Team Penske	Ford	113.278	—
8	20	Matt Kenseth	Joe Gibbs Racing	Toyota	113.943	—
9	11	Denny Hamlin	Joe Gibbs Racing	Toyota	114.501	—
10	1	Jamie McMurray	Chip Ganassi Racing	Chevrolet	116.493	—
11	37	Chris Buescher	JTG Daugherty Racing	Chevrolet	116.684	—
12	22	Joey Logano	Team Penske	Ford	116.890	—
13	5	Kasey Kahne	Hendrick Motorsports	Chevrolet	116.924	—
14	78	Martin Truex Jr.	Furniture Row Racing	Toyota	117.609	—
15	31	Ryan Newman	Richard Childress Racing	Chevrolet	118.627	—
16	17	Ricky Stenhouse Jr.	Roush Fenway Racing	Ford	119.809	—
Official All-Star qualifying results

== Qualifying (Open) ==
Clint Bowyer scored the pole for the race with a time of 28.500 and a speed of 189.474 mph (304.929 km/h).

=== Qualifying results (Open) ===
Pos	No.	Driver	Team	Manufacturer	R1	R2
1	14	Clint Bowyer	Stewart–Haas Racing	Ford	28.607	28.500
2	21	Ryan Blaney	Wood Brothers Racing	Ford	28.625	28.722
3	24	Chase Elliott	Hendrick Motorsports	Chevrolet	28.707	28.745
4	3	Austin Dillon	Richard Childress Racing	Chevrolet	28.883	28.802
5	47	A. J. Allmendinger	JTG Daugherty Racing	Chevrolet	28.930	28.833
6	19	Daniel Suárez (R)	Joe Gibbs Racing	Toyota	29.072	28.966
7	77	Erik Jones (R)	Furniture Row Racing	Toyota	28.628	29.059
8	13	Ty Dillon (R)	Germain Racing	Chevrolet	29.112	29.320
9	10	Danica Patrick	Stewart–Haas Racing	Ford	29.122	—
10	27	Paul Menard	Richard Childress Racing	Chevrolet	29.164	—
11	6	Trevor Bayne	Roush Fenway Racing	Ford	29.246	—
12	34	Landon Cassill	Front Row Motorsports	Ford	29.300	—
13	43	Regan Smith (i)	Richard Petty Motorsports	Ford	29.357	—
14	32	Matt DiBenedetto	Go Fas Racing	Ford	29.404	—
15	83	Corey LaJoie (R)	BK Racing	Toyota	29.602	—
16	72	Cole Whitt	TriStar Motorsports	Chevrolet	29.658	—
17	38	David Ragan	Front Row Motorsports	Ford	29.660	—
18	23	Gray Gaulding (R)	BK Racing	Toyota	29.897	—
19	51	Cody Ware	Rick Ware Racing	Chevrolet	30.667	—
20	66	Carl Long (i)	MBM Motorsports	Chevrolet	30.742	—
21	33	Jeffrey Earnhardt	Circle Sport – The Motorsports Group	Chevrolet	30.928	—
22	55	Derrike Cope	Premium Motorsports	Toyota	31.130	—
23	15	Reed Sorenson	Premium Motorsports	Chevrolet	0.000	—
24	95	Michael McDowell	Leavine Family Racing	Chevrolet	0.000	—
Official Monster Energy Open qualifying results

== Monster Energy Open ==
=== Monster Energy Open results ===
Pos	Grid	No.	Driver	Team	Manufacturer	Laps
1	6	19	Daniel Suárez (R)	Joe Gibbs Racing	Toyota	50
2	4	3	Austin Dillon	Richard Childress Racing	Chevrolet	50
3	3	24	Chase Elliott	Hendrick Motorsports	Chevrolet	50
4	13	43	Regan Smith (i)	Richard Petty Motorsports	Ford	50
5	9	10	Danica Patrick	Stewart–Haas Racing	Ford	50
6	8	13	Ty Dillon (R)	Germain Racing	Chevrolet	50
7	11	6	Trevor Bayne	Roush Fenway Racing	Ford	50
8	14	32	Matt DiBenedetto	Go Fas Racing	Ford	50
9	10	27	Paul Menard	Richard Childress Racing	Chevrolet	50
10	17	38	David Ragan	Front Row Motorsports	Ford	50
11	24	95	Michael McDowell	Leavine Family Racing	Chevrolet	50
12	16	72	Cole Whitt	TriStar Motorsports	Chevrolet	50
13	12	34	Landon Cassill	Front Row Motorsports	Ford	50
14	21	33	Jeffrey Earnhardt	Circle Sport – The Motorsports Group	Chevrolet	50
15	23	15	Reed Sorenson	Premium Motorsports	Chevrolet	50
16	22	55	Derrike Cope	Premium Motorsports	Toyota	50
17	20	66	Carl Long (i)	MBM Motorsports	Chevrolet	49
18	19	51	Cody Ware	Rick Ware Racing	Chevrolet	48
19	7	77	Erik Jones (R)	Furniture Row Racing	Toyota	47
20	2	21	Ryan Blaney	Wood Brothers Racing	Ford	40^{a}
21	5	47	A. J. Allmendinger	JTG Daugherty Racing	Chevrolet	34
22	18	23	Gray Gaulding (R)	BK Racing	Toyota	23
23	1	14	Clint Bowyer	Stewart–Haas Racing	Ford	20^{b}
24	15	83	Corey LaJoie (R)	BK Racing	Toyota	12
^a Winner of the second segment.^b Winner of the first segment.
Monster Energy Open race results

== All-Star Race ==
=== All-Star Race results ===
Pos	Grid	No.	Driver	Team	Manufacturer	Laps
1	2	18	Kyle Busch	Joe Gibbs Racing	Toyota	70
2	1	42	Kyle Larson	Chip Ganassi Racing	Chevrolet	70
3	4	48	Jimmie Johnson	Hendrick Motorsports	Chevrolet	70
4	5	41	Kurt Busch	Stewart–Haas Racing	Ford	70
5	10	1	Jamie McMurray	Chip Ganassi Racing	Chevrolet	70
6	3	4	Kevin Harvick	Stewart–Haas Racing	Ford	70
7	20	24	Chase Elliott	Hendrick Motorsports	Chevrolet	70
8	12	22	Joey Logano	Team Penske	Ford	70
9	7	2	Brad Keselowski	Team Penske	Ford	70
10	9	11	Denny Hamlin	Joe Gibbs Racing	Toyota	69
11	18	21	Ryan Blaney	Wood Brothers Racing	Ford	60
12	14	78	Martin Truex Jr.	Furniture Row Racing	Toyota	60
13	17	14	Clint Bowyer	Stewart–Haas Racing	Ford	60
14	16	17	Ricky Stenhouse Jr.	Roush Fenway Racing	Ford	60
15	19	19	Daniel Suárez (R)	Joe Gibbs Racing	Toyota	60
16	13	5	Kasey Kahne	Hendrick Motorsports	Chevrolet	60
17	11	37	Chris Buescher	JTG Daugherty Racing	Chevrolet	60
18	6	88	Dale Earnhardt Jr.	Hendrick Motorsports	Chevrolet	60
19	15	31	Ryan Newman	Richard Childress Racing	Chevrolet	57
20	8	20	Matt Kenseth	Joe Gibbs Racing	Toyota	20
Monster Energy NASCAR All-Star Race results

== Media ==
=== Television ===
Fox Sports was the television broadcaster of the race in the United States. Lap-by-lap announcer, Mike Joy, was accompanied on the broadcast by retired NASCAR drivers, Jeff Gordon and Darrell Waltrip. Jamie Little, Vince Welch, and Matt Yocum reported from pit lane.

FS1 Television
Booth announcers	Pit reporters
Lap-by-lap: Mike Joy; Color-commentator: Jeff Gordon; Color commentator: Darrell Waltrip	Jamie Little; Vince Welch; Matt Yocum

=== Radio ===
Motor Racing Network (MRN) continued their longstanding relationship with the track to broadcast the race on radio. The lead announcers for the race's broadcast were Joe Moore, Jeff Striegle and Rusty Wallace. The network also implemented two announcers on each side of the track: Dave Moody in turns 1 and 2 and Kyle Rickey in turns 3 and 4. Alex Hayden, Winston Kelly, Kim Coon, and Steve Post were the network's pit lane reporters. The network's broadcast was also simulcasted on Sirius XM NASCAR Radio.

MRN Radio
Booth announcers	Turn announcers	Pit reporters
Lead announcer: Joe Moore; Announcer: Jeff Striegle; Announcer: Rusty Wallace	Turns 1 & 2: Dave Moody; Turns 3 & 4: Kyle Rickey	Alex Hayden; Winston Kelly; Kim Coon; Steve Post
