= 2018 Coca-Cola 600 =

Race details
- Race 13 of 36 in the 2018 Monster Energy NASCAR Cup Series
- 2018 Coca-Cola 600 program cover, with artwork by NASCAR artist Sam Bass.
- Date: May 27, 2018
- Location: Charlotte Motor Speedway in Concord, North Carolina
- Course: Permanent racing facility
- Course length: 1.5 miles (2.4 km)
- Distance: 400 laps, 600 mi (960 km)
- Average speed: 136.692 miles per hour (219.984 km/h)

Pole position
Driver	Kyle Busch	Joe Gibbs Racing
- Time: 28.149

Most laps led
Driver	Kyle Busch	Joe Gibbs Racing
- Laps: 377

Winner
No. 18	Kyle Busch	Joe Gibbs Racing

Television in the United States
- Network: Fox
- Announcers: Mike Joy, Jeff Gordon and Darrell Waltrip
- Nielsen ratings: 2.3/2.4 (Overnight)

Radio in the United States
- Radio: PRN
- Booth announcers: Doug Rice, Mark Garrow and Wendy Venturini
- Turn announcers: Rob Albright (1 & 2) and Pat Patterson (3 & 4)

The 2018 Coca-Cola 600, the 59th running of the event, was a Monster Energy NASCAR Cup Series race held on May 27, 2018 at Charlotte Motor Speedway in Concord, North Carolina. Contested over 400 laps on the 1.5 mile (2.42 km) asphalt speedway, it is the 13th race of the 2018 Monster Energy NASCAR Cup Series season.

== Report ==
=== Background ===
Charlotte Motor Speedway, the track where the race was held.

The race was held at Charlotte Motor Speedway, which is located in Concord, North Carolina. The speedway complex includes a 1.5-mile (2.4 km) quad-oval track that will be utilized for the race, as well as a dragstrip and a dirt track. The speedway was built in 1959 by Bruton Smith and is considered the home track for NASCAR with many race teams based in the Charlotte metropolitan area. The track is owned and operated by Speedway Motorsports Inc. (SMI) with Marcus G. Smith serving as track president.

==== Entry list ====
No.	Driver	Team	Manufacturer
00	Landon Cassill	StarCom Racing	Chevrolet
1	Jamie McMurray	Chip Ganassi Racing	Chevrolet
2	Brad Keselowski	Team Penske	Ford
3	Austin Dillon	Richard Childress Racing	Chevrolet
4	Kevin Harvick	Stewart–Haas Racing	Ford
6	Matt Kenseth	Roush Fenway Racing	Ford
7	J. J. Yeley (i)	NY Racing Team	Chevrolet
9	Chase Elliott	Hendrick Motorsports	Chevrolet
10	Aric Almirola	Stewart–Haas Racing	Ford
11	Denny Hamlin	Joe Gibbs Racing	Toyota
12	Ryan Blaney	Team Penske	Ford
13	Ty Dillon	Germain Racing	Chevrolet
14	Clint Bowyer	Stewart–Haas Racing	Ford
15	Ross Chastain (i)	Premium Motorsports	Chevrolet
17	Ricky Stenhouse Jr.	Roush Fenway Racing	Ford
18	Kyle Busch	Joe Gibbs Racing	Toyota
19	Daniel Suárez	Joe Gibbs Racing	Toyota
20	Erik Jones	Joe Gibbs Racing	Toyota
21	Paul Menard	Wood Brothers Racing	Ford
22	Joey Logano	Team Penske	Ford
23	Gray Gaulding	BK Racing	Toyota
24	William Byron (R)	Hendrick Motorsports	Chevrolet
31	Ryan Newman	Richard Childress Racing	Chevrolet
32	Matt DiBenedetto	Go Fas Racing	Ford
34	Michael McDowell	Front Row Motorsports	Ford
37	Chris Buescher	JTG Daugherty Racing	Chevrolet
38	David Ragan	Front Row Motorsports	Ford
41	Kurt Busch	Stewart–Haas Racing	Ford
42	Kyle Larson	Chip Ganassi Racing	Chevrolet
43	Bubba Wallace (R)	Richard Petty Motorsports	Chevrolet
47	A. J. Allmendinger	JTG Daugherty Racing	Chevrolet
48	Jimmie Johnson	Hendrick Motorsports	Chevrolet
51	B. J. McLeod (i)	Rick Ware Racing	Chevrolet
55	Jeffrey Earnhardt	Premium Motorsports	Chevrolet
66	Timmy Hill (i)	MBM Motorsports	Toyota
72	Corey LaJoie	TriStar Motorsports	Chevrolet
78	Martin Truex Jr.	Furniture Row Racing	Toyota
88	Alex Bowman	Hendrick Motorsports	Chevrolet
95	Kasey Kahne	Leavine Family Racing	Chevrolet
96	Parker Kligerman (i)	Gaunt Brothers Racing	Toyota
Official entry list

== First practice ==
Denny Hamlin was the fastest in the first practice session with a time of 28.401 seconds and a speed of 190.134 mph (305.991 km/h).

Pos	No.	Driver	Team	Manufacturer	Time	Speed
1	11	Denny Hamlin	Joe Gibbs Racing	Toyota	28.401	190.134
2	12	Ryan Blaney	Team Penske	Ford	28.470	189.673
3	2	Brad Keselowski	Team Penske	Ford	28.506	189.434
Official first practice results

== Qualifying ==
Kyle Busch scored the pole for the race with a time of 28.149 and a speed of 191.836 mph (308.730 km/h).

=== Qualifying results ===
Pos	No.	Driver	Team	Manufacturer	R1	R2	R3
1	18	Kyle Busch	Joe Gibbs Racing	Toyota	28.407	28.185	28.149
2	22	Joey Logano	Team Penske	Ford	28.510	28.379	28.240
3	11	Denny Hamlin	Joe Gibbs Racing	Toyota	28.539	28.360	28.265
4	20	Erik Jones	Joe Gibbs Racing	Toyota	28.425	28.555	28.288
5	2	Brad Keselowski	Team Penske	Ford	28.565	28.590	28.338
6	31	Ryan Newman	Richard Childress Racing	Chevrolet	28.579	28.408	28.391
7	1	Jamie McMurray	Chip Ganassi Racing	Chevrolet	28.267	28.433	28.430
8	12	Ryan Blaney	Team Penske	Ford	28.463	28.387	28.437
9	10	Aric Almirola	Stewart–Haas Racing	Ford	28.741	28.448	28.465
10	19	Daniel Suárez	Joe Gibbs Racing	Toyota	28.662	28.591	28.465
11	42	Kyle Larson	Chip Ganassi Racing	Chevrolet	28.629	28.461	28.580
12	3	Austin Dillon	Richard Childress Racing	Chevrolet	28.626	28.560	28.712
13	17	Ricky Stenhouse Jr.	Roush Fenway Racing	Ford	28.542	28.595	—
14	21	Paul Menard	Wood Brothers Racing	Ford	28.519	28.601	—
15	78	Martin Truex Jr.	Furniture Row Racing	Toyota	28.632	28.620	—
16	41	Kurt Busch	Stewart–Haas Racing	Ford	28.481	28.668	—
17	6	Matt Kenseth	Roush Fenway Racing	Ford	28.685	28.726	—
18	37	Chris Buescher	JTG Daugherty Racing	Chevrolet	28.652	28.738	—
19	38	David Ragan	Front Row Motorsports	Ford	28.756	28.796	—
20	13	Ty Dillon	Germain Racing	Chevrolet	28.734	28.815	—
21	24	William Byron (R)	Hendrick Motorsports	Chevrolet	28.722	28.835	—
22	9	Chase Elliott	Hendrick Motorsports	Chevrolet	28.588	28.860	—
23	48	Jimmie Johnson	Hendrick Motorsports	Chevrolet	28.652	28.935	—
24	43	Bubba Wallace (R)	Richard Petty Motorsports	Chevrolet	28.673	29.061	—
25	15	Ross Chastain (i)	Premium Motorsports	Chevrolet	28.781	—	—
26	95	Kasey Kahne	Leavine Family Racing	Chevrolet	28.787	—	—
27	88	Alex Bowman	Hendrick Motorsports	Chevrolet	28.801	—	—
28	14	Clint Bowyer	Stewart–Haas Racing	Ford	28.834	—	—
29	34	Michael McDowell	Front Row Motorsports	Ford	28.894	—	—
30	47	A. J. Allmendinger	JTG Daugherty Racing	Chevrolet	28.921	—	—
31	32	Matt DiBenedetto	Go Fas Racing	Ford	29.025	—	—
32	96	Parker Kligerman (i)	Gaunt Brothers Racing	Toyota	29.173	—	—
33	72	Corey LaJoie	TriStar Motorsports	Chevrolet	29.484	—	—
34	23	Gray Gaulding	BK Racing	Toyota	29.486	—	—
35	00	Landon Cassill	StarCom Racing	Chevrolet	29.513	—	—
36	66	Timmy Hill (i)	MBM Motorsports	Toyota	29.963	—	—
37	55	Jeffrey Earnhardt	Premium Motorsports	Chevrolet	30.172	—	—
38	51	B. J. McLeod (i)	Rick Ware Racing	Chevrolet	30.383	—	—
39	4	Kevin Harvick	Stewart–Haas Racing	Ford	0.000	—	—
40	7	J. J. Yeley (i)	NY Racing Team	Chevrolet	0.000	—	—
Official qualifying results

== Practice (post-qualifying) ==
=== Second practice ===
Second practice session for Saturday was cancelled due to weather.

=== Final practice ===
Erik Jones was the fastest in the final practice session with a time of 28.870 seconds and a speed of 187.045 mph (301.020 km/h).

Pos	No.	Driver	Team	Manufacturer	Time	Speed
1	20	Erik Jones	Joe Gibbs Racing	Toyota	28.870	187.045
2	42	Kyle Larson	Chip Ganassi Racing	Chevrolet	28.929	186.664
3	12	Ryan Blaney	Team Penske	Ford	29.016	186.104
Official final practice results

== Race ==
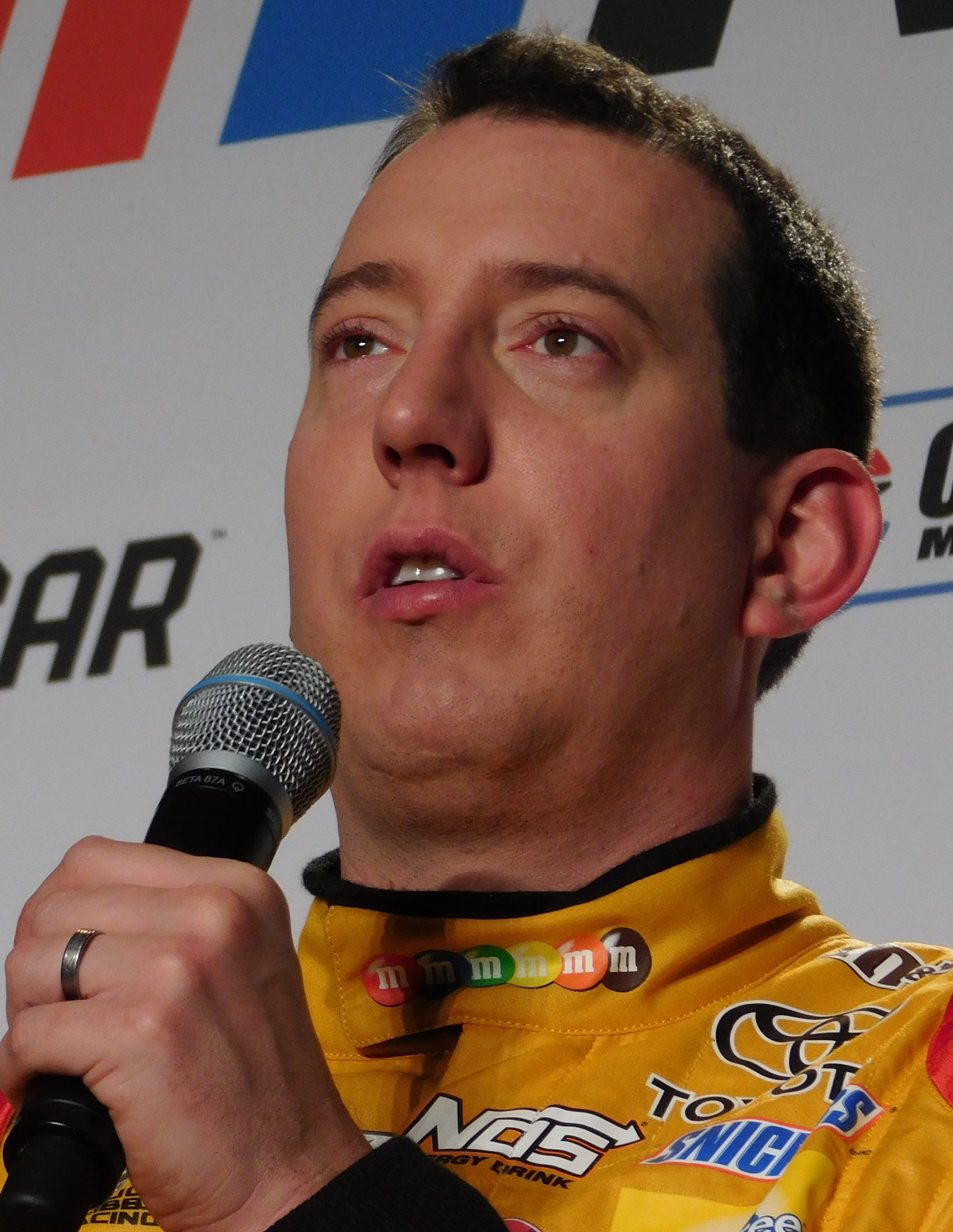
Kyle Busch swept all four stages and won the race from the pole position.

=== Stage Results ===
Stage 1 Laps: 100

Pos	No	Driver	Team	Manufacturer	Points
1	18	Kyle Busch	Joe Gibbs Racing	Toyota	10
2	12	Ryan Blaney	Team Penske	Ford	9
3	42	Kyle Larson	Chip Ganassi Racing	Chevrolet	8
4	78	Martin Truex Jr.	Furniture Row Racing	Toyota	7
5	48	Jimmie Johnson	Hendrick Motorsports	Chevrolet	6
6	10	Aric Almirola	Stewart–Haas Racing	Ford	5
7	14	Clint Bowyer	Stewart–Haas Racing	Ford	4
8	11	Denny Hamlin	Joe Gibbs Racing	Toyota	3
9	17	Ricky Stenhouse Jr.	Roush Fenway Racing	Ford	2
10	20	Erik Jones	Joe Gibbs Racing	Toyota	1
Official stage one results

Stage 2 Laps: 100

Pos	No	Driver	Team	Manufacturer	Points
1	18	Kyle Busch	Joe Gibbs Racing	Toyota	10
2	78	Martin Truex Jr.	Furniture Row Racing	Toyota	9
3	42	Kyle Larson	Chip Ganassi Racing	Chevrolet	8
4	11	Denny Hamlin	Joe Gibbs Racing	Toyota	7
5	14	Clint Bowyer	Stewart–Haas Racing	Ford	6
6	10	Aric Almirola	Stewart–Haas Racing	Ford	5
7	9	Chase Elliott	Hendrick Motorsports	Chevrolet	4
8	48	Jimmie Johnson	Hendrick Motorsports	Chevrolet	3
9	31	Ryan Newman	Richard Childress Racing	Chevrolet	2
10	20	Erik Jones	Joe Gibbs Racing	Toyota	1
Official stage two results

Stage 3 Laps: 100

Pos	No	Driver	Team	Manufacturer	Points
1	18	Kyle Busch	Joe Gibbs Racing	Toyota	10
2	20	Erik Jones	Joe Gibbs Racing	Toyota	9
3	2	Brad Keselowski	Team Penske	Ford	8
4	41	Kurt Busch	Stewart–Haas Racing	Ford	7
5	1	Jamie McMurray	Chip Ganassi Racing	Chevrolet	6
6	11	Denny Hamlin	Joe Gibbs Racing	Toyota	5
7	95	Kasey Kahne	Leavine Family Racing	Chevrolet	4
8	78	Martin Truex Jr.	Furniture Row Racing	Toyota	3
9	17	Ricky Stenhouse Jr.	Roush Fenway Racing	Ford	2
10	31	Ryan Newman	Richard Childress Racing	Chevrolet	1
Official stage three results

=== Final Stage Results ===
Stage 4 Laps: 100

Pos	Grid	No	Driver	Team	Manufacturer	Laps	Points
1	1	18	Kyle Busch	Joe Gibbs Racing	Toyota	400	70
2	15	78	Martin Truex Jr.	Furniture Row Racing	Toyota	400	54
3	3	11	Denny Hamlin	Joe Gibbs Racing	Toyota	400	49
4	5	2	Brad Keselowski	Team Penske	Ford	400	41
5	23	48	Jimmie Johnson	Hendrick Motorsports	Chevrolet	400	41
6	7	1	Jamie McMurray	Chip Ganassi Racing	Chevrolet	400	37
7	11	42	Kyle Larson	Chip Ganassi Racing	Chevrolet	400	46
8	16	41	Kurt Busch	Stewart–Haas Racing	Ford	400	36
9	27	88	Alex Bowman	Hendrick Motorsports	Chevrolet	400	28
10	13	17	Ricky Stenhouse Jr.	Roush Fenway Racing	Ford	399	31
11	22	9	Chase Elliott	Hendrick Motorsports	Chevrolet	399	30
12	28	14	Clint Bowyer	Stewart–Haas Racing	Ford	399	35
13	9	10	Aric Almirola	Stewart–Haas Racing	Ford	399	34
14	14	21	Paul Menard	Wood Brothers Racing	Ford	399	23
15	10	19	Daniel Suárez	Joe Gibbs Racing	Toyota	399	22
16	24	43	Bubba Wallace (R)	Richard Petty Motorsports	Chevrolet	399	21
17	17	6	Matt Kenseth	Roush Fenway Racing	Ford	399	20
18	29	34	Michael McDowell	Front Row Motorsports	Ford	399	19
19	4	20	Erik Jones	Joe Gibbs Racing	Toyota	399	29
20	26	95	Kasey Kahne	Leavine Family Racing	Chevrolet	399	21
21	20	13	Ty Dillon	Germain Racing	Chevrolet	399	16
22	2	22	Joey Logano	Team Penske	Ford	399	15
23	30	47	A. J. Allmendinger	JTG Daugherty Racing	Chevrolet	399	14
24	25	15	Ross Chastain (i)	Premium Motorsports	Chevrolet	398	0
25	19	38	David Ragan	Front Row Motorsports	Ford	396	12
26	33	72	Corey LaJoie	TriStar Motorsports	Chevrolet	396	11
27	32	96	Parker Kligerman (i)	Gaunt Brothers Racing	Toyota	394	0
28	35	00	Landon Cassill	StarCom Racing	Chevrolet	394	9
29	18	37	Chris Buescher	JTG Daugherty Racing	Chevrolet	394	8
30	37	55	Jeffrey Earnhardt	Premium Motorsports	Chevrolet	389	7
31	34	23	Gray Gaulding	BK Racing	Toyota	388	6
32	36	66	Timmy Hill (i)	MBM Motorsports	Toyota	383	0
33	38	51	B. J. McLeod (i)	Rick Ware Racing	Chevrolet	373	0
34	12	3	Austin Dillon	Richard Childress Racing	Chevrolet	348	3
35	6	31	Ryan Newman	Richard Childress Racing	Chevrolet	344	5
36	8	12	Ryan Blaney	Team Penske	Ford	278	10
37	31	32	Matt DiBenedetto	Go Fas Racing	Ford	257	1
38	40	7	J. J. Yeley (i)	NY Racing Team	Chevrolet	191	0
39	21	24	William Byron (R)	Hendrick Motorsports	Chevrolet	139	1
40	39	4	Kevin Harvick	Stewart–Haas Racing	Ford	83	1
Official race results

=== Race statistics ===
- Lead changes: 4 among different drivers
- Cautions/Laps: 11 for 54
- Red flags: 0
- Time of race: 4 hours, 23 minutes and 22 seconds
- Average speed: 136.692 miles per hour (219.984 km/h)

== Media ==
=== Television ===
Fox Sports televised the race in the United States for the eighteenth consecutive year. Mike Joy was the lap-by-lap announcer, while three-time Coca-Cola 600 winner, Jeff Gordon and five-time race winner Darrell Waltrip were the color commentators. Jamie Little, Regan Smith, Vince Welch and Matt Yocum reported from pit lane during the race.

Fox Television
Booth announcers	Pit reporters
Lap-by-lap: Mike Joy; Color-commentator: Jeff Gordon; Color commentator: Darrell Waltrip	Jamie Little; Regan Smith; Vince Welch; Matt Yocum

=== Radio ===
Radio coverage of the race was broadcast by the Performance Racing Network (PRN), and was simulcasted on Sirius XM NASCAR Radio. Doug Rice, Mark Garrow and Wendy Venturini called the race in the booth when the field raced through the quad-oval. Rob Albright reported the race from a billboard in turn 2 when the field was racing through turns 1 and 2 and halfway down the backstretch. Pat Patterson called the race from a billboard outside of turn 3 when the field raced through the other half of the backstretch and through turns 3 and 4. Brad Gillie, Brett McMillan, Jim Noble and Steve Richards were the pit reporters during the broadcast.

PRN Radio
Booth announcers	Turn announcers	Pit reporters
Lead announcer: Doug Rice; Announcer: Mark Garrow; Announcer: Wendy Venturini	Turns 1 & 2: Rob Albright; Turns 3 & 4: Pat Patterson	Brad Gillie; Brett McMilan; Jim Noble; Steve Richards

== Standings after the race ==
Drivers' Championship standings

	Pos	Driver	Points
	1	Kyle Busch	573
	2	Joey Logano	506 (–67)
	3	Kevin Harvick	485 (–88)
	4	Brad Keselowski	437 (–136)
3	5	Martin Truex Jr.	430 (–143)
1	6	Kurt Busch	429 (–144)
	7	Denny Hamlin	429 (–144)
2	8	Clint Bowyer	421 (–152)
1	9	Kyle Larson	382 (–191)
1	10	Aric Almirola	376 (–197)
2	11	Ryan Blaney	375 (–198)
	12	Jimmie Johnson	327 (–246)
	13	Erik Jones	314 (–259)
	14	Alex Bowman	299 (–274)
	15	Chase Elliott	296 (–277)
	16	Ricky Stenhouse Jr.	296 (–277)
Official driver's standings

Manufacturers' Championship standings

Pos	Manufacturer	Points
1	Ford	472
2	Toyota	467 (–5)
3	Chevrolet	416 (–56)
Official manufacturers' standings

- Note: Only the first 16 positions are included for the driver standings.
- . – Driver has clinched a position in the Monster Energy NASCAR Cup Series playoffs.

Previous race: 2018 KC Masterpiece 400	Monster Energy NASCAR Cup Series; 2018 season	Next race: 2018 Pocono 400
