= Rowdy (2022 film) =

- Directed by: Richard Valenzuela; JJ Terry
- Produced by: Chance Wright
- Starring: Kyle Busch; Dale Earnhardt Jr. Samantha Busch; Kurt Busch
- Edited by: JJ Terry
- Production companies: NASCAR Productions; Venture 10 Studio Group; Wright Productions
- Distributed by: Amazon Freevee
- Release date: June 23, 2022 (United States)
- Running time: 105 minutes
- Country: United States
- Language: English

Rowdy is an American documentary film about the NASCAR career of Kyle Busch. It premiered at Regal Opry Mills on June 23, 2022. It was later acquired by Amazon and premiered on Amazon Freevee on February 3, 2023.

== Summary ==
The film covers the NASCAR career of Kyle Busch. It includes his reaction to the death of his friend and confidant Ricky Hendrick in the 2004 Hendrick Motorsports aircraft crash, and explores his relationship with his older brother Kurt Busch and his rivalry with Dale Earnhardt Jr. It looks at his 2015 season, which began with a crash at Daytona International Speedway that required extensive rehabilitation, and ended with his first championship win at the 2015 NASCAR Sprint Cup Series. It features interviews with Kurt Busch, his wife Samantha Busch, Dale Earnhardt Jr, Jeff Gordon, Rick Hendrick, Joe Gibbs, and Marty Smith.

== Cast ==
- Kyle Busch
- Dale Earnhardt Jr.
- Kurt Busch
- Samantha Busch
- Brexton Busch
- Tom Busch
- Gaye Busch
- Jamie Little
- Jeff Gordon
- Rick Hendrick
- Joe Gibbs
- Marty Smith
- Derek Daugherty
- Cody Little

== Production ==
The film was produced by Chance Wright, the owner of Wright Productions, along with Venture 10 Studio Group, in collaboration with NASCAR Productions. When Wright proposed the documentary, Busch initially said no, before eventually agreeing to the film.

== Release ==
The film premiered at Regal Opry Mills on June 23, 2022, prior to that weekend's Ally 400 at Nashville Superspeedway, and was shown in theaters on June 29 for one night only. It premiered on Amazon Freevee on February 3, 2023.
