= Kyle Busch =

American racing driver (1985–2026)

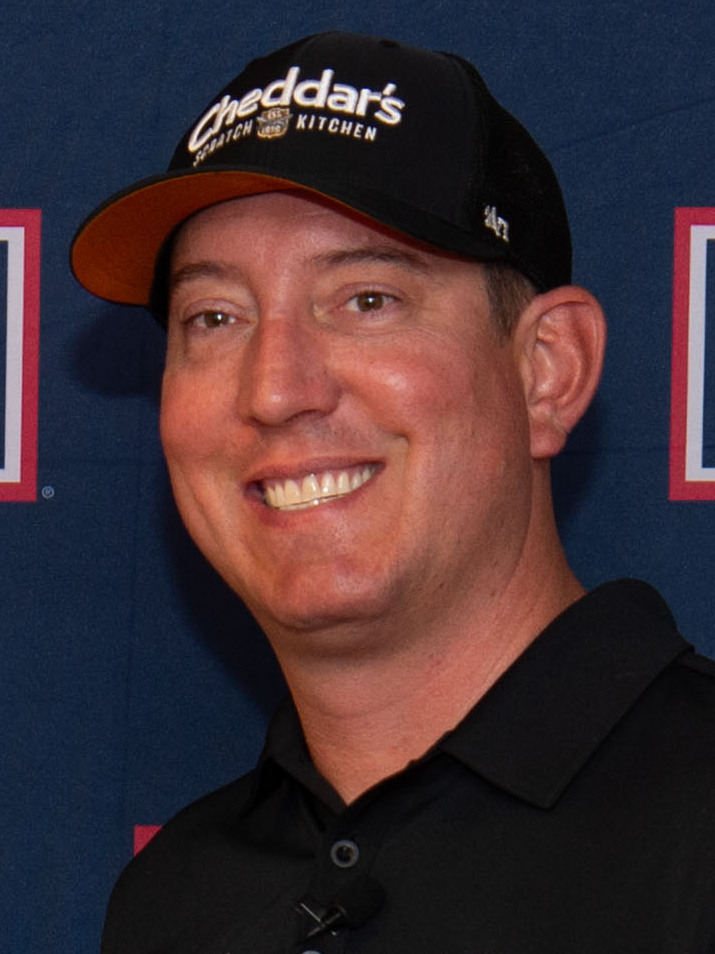
- Busch in 2025
- Born: Kyle Thomas Busch; May 2, 1985; Las Vegas, Nevada, U.S.
- Died: May 21, 2026 (aged 41); Charlotte, North Carolina, U.S.
- Height: 6 ft 1 in (1.85 m)
- Weight: 185 lb (84 kg)
- Achievements: As Driver: 2015, 2019 NASCAR Cup Series Champion; 2018, 2019 NASCAR Cup Series Regular Season Champion; 2009 Nationwide Series Champion; 2008 Southern 500 Winner; 2015, 2016 Brickyard 400 Winner; 2018 Coca-Cola 600 Winner; 2017 Monster Energy NASCAR All-Star Race Winner; 2012, 2021 Busch Clash Winner 2026 Daytona 500 pole winner; 2009, 2013, 2016 Daytona Duel Winner 2009, 2017 Snowball Derby Winner 2009 Winchester 400 Winner 2009 Redbud 400 Winner 2011 Slinger Nationals Winner 2011 Oxford 250 Winner 2012 Prelude to the Dream Winner Records; All-Time Wins Leader in the top three NASCAR series overall (234); All-Time Wins Leader in the NASCAR O'Reilly Auto Parts Series (102); All-Time Wins Leader in the NASCAR Craftsman Truck Series (69); 1st driver in the NASCAR Cup Series to win on every track competed (as of May 27, 2018); 1st driver to complete a Triple Threat in one weekend (twice at Bristol, 2010 and 2017); Streak of 19 consecutive seasons in the NASCAR Cup Series with at least one win (series record) As Car Owner: 2015, 2017, NASCAR Craftsman Truck Series Champion (outright) 2010, 2013, 2014, 2015, 2016, 2017, 2019 NASCAR Craftsman Truck Series Champion (in owners points) 2022 ARCA Menards Series Champion 2022 ARCA Menards Series East Champion
- Awards: 2004 NASCAR Busch Series Rookie of the Year; 2005 NASCAR Nextel Cup Series Rookie of the Year; 2016, 2019 Best Driver; Named one of NASCAR's 75 Greatest Drivers (2023); West Coast Stock Car Hall of Fame (2027); 2026 NASCAR Cup Series Most Popular Driver (posthumously)

NASCAR Cup Series career
- 762 races run over 24 years
- 2025 position: 21st
- Best finish: 1st (2015, 2019)
- First race: 2004 UAW-DaimlerChrysler 400 (Las Vegas)
- Last race: 2026 Go Bowling at The Glen (Watkins Glen) (Note: The 2026 Watkins Glen race on May 10, 2026, was the final points race that Busch drove in. Busch would drive in the 2026 NASCAR All-Star Race at Dover Motor Speedway the following week, but it was an exhibition race with no points awarded.)
- First win: 2005 Sony HD 500 (California)
- Last win: 2023 Enjoy Illinois 300 (Gateway)
Wins	Top tens	Poles
63	395	35

NASCAR O'Reilly Auto Parts Series career
- 367 races run over 21 years
- 2024 position: 88th
- Best finish: 1st (2009)
- First race: 2003 Carquest Auto Parts 300 (Charlotte)
- Last race: 2024 BetMGM 300 (Charlotte)
- First win: 2004 Funai 250 (Richmond)
- Last win: 2021 Credit Karma Money 250 (Atlanta)
Wins	Top tens	Poles
102	267	70

NASCAR FedEx Freight Truck Series career
- 184 races run over 24 years
- 2025 position: 76th
- Best finish: 14th (2008, 2010)
- First race: 2001 Power Stroke Diesel 200 (IRP)
- Last race: 2026 Ecosave 200 (Dover)
- First win: 2005 Quaker Steak and Lube 200 (Charlotte)
- Last win: 2026 Ecosave 200 (Dover)
Wins	Top tens	Poles
69	148	24

ARCA Menards Series career
- 9 races run over 3 years
- Best finish: 22nd (2003)
- First race: 2002 EasyCare Vehicle Service Contracts 150 (Charlotte)
- Last race: 2004 Advance Discount Auto Parts 200 (Daytona)
- First win: 2003 PFG Lester 150 (Nashville)
- Last win: 2004 Advance Discount Auto Parts 200 (Daytona)
Wins	Top tens	Poles
3	3	3

ARCA Menards Series East career
- 1 race run over 1 year
- Best finish: 44th (2009)
- First race: 2009 Long John Silver's 200 (Iowa)
- First win: 2009 Long John Silver's 200 (Iowa)
Wins	Top tens	Poles
1	1	1
- Statistics up to date as of May 23, 2026.

Kyle Thomas Busch (May 2, 1985 – May 21, 2026), nicknamed "Rowdy", was an American professional stock car racing driver and racing team owner who competed from 2001 until his death in 2026. Throughout his career, he raced under several car numbers, though he was most prominently associated with the No. 18 Toyota (Note: Busch's No. 18 Toyota Camry was sponsored by Mars, Incorporated, primarily featuring M&M's and its characters, but also featured other products of the manufacturer such as Doublemint, Skittles, and Twix.) for Joe Gibbs Racing between 2008 and 2022 in the NASCAR Cup Series. (Note: Busch has also made several appearances in the No. 18 car/truck in both the NASCAR O'Reilly Auto Parts Series and the NASCAR Craftsman Truck Series throughout his career. In addition to the No. 18, Busch has competed under a variety of numbers across NASCAR's top national series: In the early stages of his career between 2004 and 2007, Busch competed under the No. 5 Chevrolet for Hendrick Motorsports in both the NASCAR Nextel Cup Series and the NASCAR Busch Series. The car featured sponsorship from companies such as CarQuest, Kellogg's (whose paint schemes included mascot characters like Cornelius the Rooster, Tony the Tiger, and Snap, Crackle and Pop), and Lowe's.; In 2012, Busch started fielding the No. 54 Toyota Camry in the NASCAR Nationwide Series for his organization, Kyle Busch Motorsports, alongside his brother, Kurt, sponsored by Monster Energy. However, after not scoring a victory over the course of a season, Busch returned to Joe Gibbs Racing's Nationwide Series program for the 2013 season, bringing the No. 54 car with him; he would continue to race with the number until his departure from the team in 2022. Following his return to the series in 2023, Busch competed in several races driving the No. 10 Chevrolet for Kaulig Racing. During those events, the car was sponsored by LA Golf, a golf equipment company based in Anaheim, California.; Throughout his NASCAR Craftsman Truck Series career from 2013 to 2023, Busch primarily drove the No. 51 Toyota for Kyle Busch Motorsports. Over the years, the truck featured sponsorship from companies such as Beechcraft, Dollar General, and Toyota through its ToyotaCare campaign.; Following his signing with Richard Childress Racing in 2023, Busch became the primary driver of the No. 8 Chevrolet Chevrolet Camaro ZL1 in the NASCAR Cup Series. Simultaneously, Busch last competed part-time in the NASCAR Craftsman Truck Series, driving the No. 7 Chevrolet Silverado RST for Spire Motorsports. During his time with the organizations through 2026, he was backed by sponsors including Lucas Oil Products, Rebel, and Zone Premium Nicotine Pouches.; Busch has also competed at least once in the 4, 15, 20, 22, 32, 33, 46, 47, 57, 60, 84, 87, 92, and 99 in the top national series.) Known for his dominance across NASCAR's top three divisions, Busch is widely regarded as one of the most accomplished and talented drivers in motorsports history.

Born and raised into a racing family in Las Vegas, Nevada, Busch was immersed in motorsports at an early age, assisting with race car preparations as a child before progressing into competitive driving in go-karts and short-track racing during his adolescence. By his early teens, he had already established himself as a standout talent on the local circuit, capturing multiple championships and attracting the attention of stock car organizations. He made his national NASCAR debut in 2001 in the NASCAR Craftsman Truck Series with Roush Racing. Two years later, he joined Hendrick Motorsports through their driver development program, eventually advancing into NASCAR's major touring series. He remained with the organization through the 2007 season before signing with Joe Gibbs Racing in 2008, where he competed and achieved the most successful stretch of his career over a fifteen-year tenure. In 2023, he joined Richard Childress Racing, competing for the organization until his death in 2026.

At the time of his death, Busch ranked ninth on the all-time NASCAR Cup Series wins list and first in overall wins between the top three NASCAR divisions. His career achievements included three major national series championships, having won the 2009 NASCAR Nationwide Series and two NASCAR Cup Series championships (2015 and 2019). He also amassed victories in several important races, highlighted by four crown jewel events, (Note: Busch won the 2018 Coca-Cola 600, the 2008 Southern 500, and two Brickyard 400s (2015 and 2016).) and was the recipient of numerous awards. (Note: Among his awards are two NASCAR Rookie of the Year honors (for the 2004 NASCAR Busch Series and 2005 NASCAR Nextel Cup Series seasons) and two ESPY Awards for Best Driver (2016 and 2019).) His aggressive driving style and demeanor led to him earning several nicknames over the course of his career. (Note: Busch's nicknames over the years included "Rowdy" (inspired by Rowdy Burns, a character from the 1990 film Days of Thunder, portrayed by Michael Rooker) and "Wild Thing", "the Candy Man" due to his longtime sponsorship with Mars, Incorporated, "Shrub" as a playful nod to being the younger brother of Kurt Busch (with a small bush being called a shrub), "Kyle Kush" because of his partnership with cannabis company 3Chi, and the self-proclaimed "KFB".)

In addition to his driving career, Busch owned and operated Kyle Busch Motorsports, a stock car racing team that competed in the O'Reilly Auto Parts Series from 2011 to 2013 and the Truck Series from 2010 to 2023. Busch was the younger brother of 2004 NASCAR Nextel Cup Series champion Kurt Busch.

== Early life and career ==
Busch was born on May 2, 1985, in Las Vegas, Nevada, the second child of Tom and Gaye Busch, who were originally from Schaumburg, Illinois. Tom, then working as a mechanic at a Ford dealership in Las Vegas, was introduced to racing by a colleague at a local short track. He later became a stock car driver himself, winning several championships in the area. Busch followed a similar path; he was introduced to racing at age six, driving a makeshift go-kart around the cul-de-sac in his family's neighborhood. Because he could not reach the throttle, his father operated the gas pedal while Busch focused on steering and learning basic driving skills. He began working in the family garage with his father and older brother Kurt, and by age 10 he was serving as crew chief for Kurt's dwarf car team. At age thirteen, Busch began his career in 1998, and from 1999 to 2001, he won over 65 races in legends car racing, claiming two track championships at the Las Vegas Motor Speedway Bullring. In 2001, he transitioned to late model racing, securing 10 victories at the Bullring that season.

At the age of sixteen, Busch began competing in the NASCAR Craftsman Truck Series, driving the No. 99 Ford for Roush Racing, replacing the released Nathan Haseleu midway through the 2001 season. He debuted at Indianapolis Raceway Park, finishing an impressive ninth in his first race. In his second race at Chicago Motor Speedway, he led until his truck ran out of fuel with twelve laps remaining. Busch was fastest in practice for the 2001 Auto Club 200 at California Speedway in Fontana, CA, but not yet 18, was ruled ineligible to compete under the 1998 Tobacco Master Settlement Agreement. Tim Woods III replaced Busch in the No. 99 Ford and finished 25th. Six weeks after the Fontana incident, NASCAR implemented a minimum age requirement of eighteen, starting in 2002, to prevent similar incidents.

Busch transitioned from NASCAR to the American Speed Association National Tour, where he finished 8th in the standings. He competed in six Truck Series races in 2001, with two ninth-place finishes at IRP and Las Vegas Motor Speedway.

In 2002, Busch graduated early with honors from Durango High School in Spring Valley, to focus on his racing career. That same year, he debuted in the ARCA RE/MAX Series at Lowe's Motor Speedway, finishing twelfth in the No. 22 Chevrolet for WP Motorsports.

== NASCAR ==
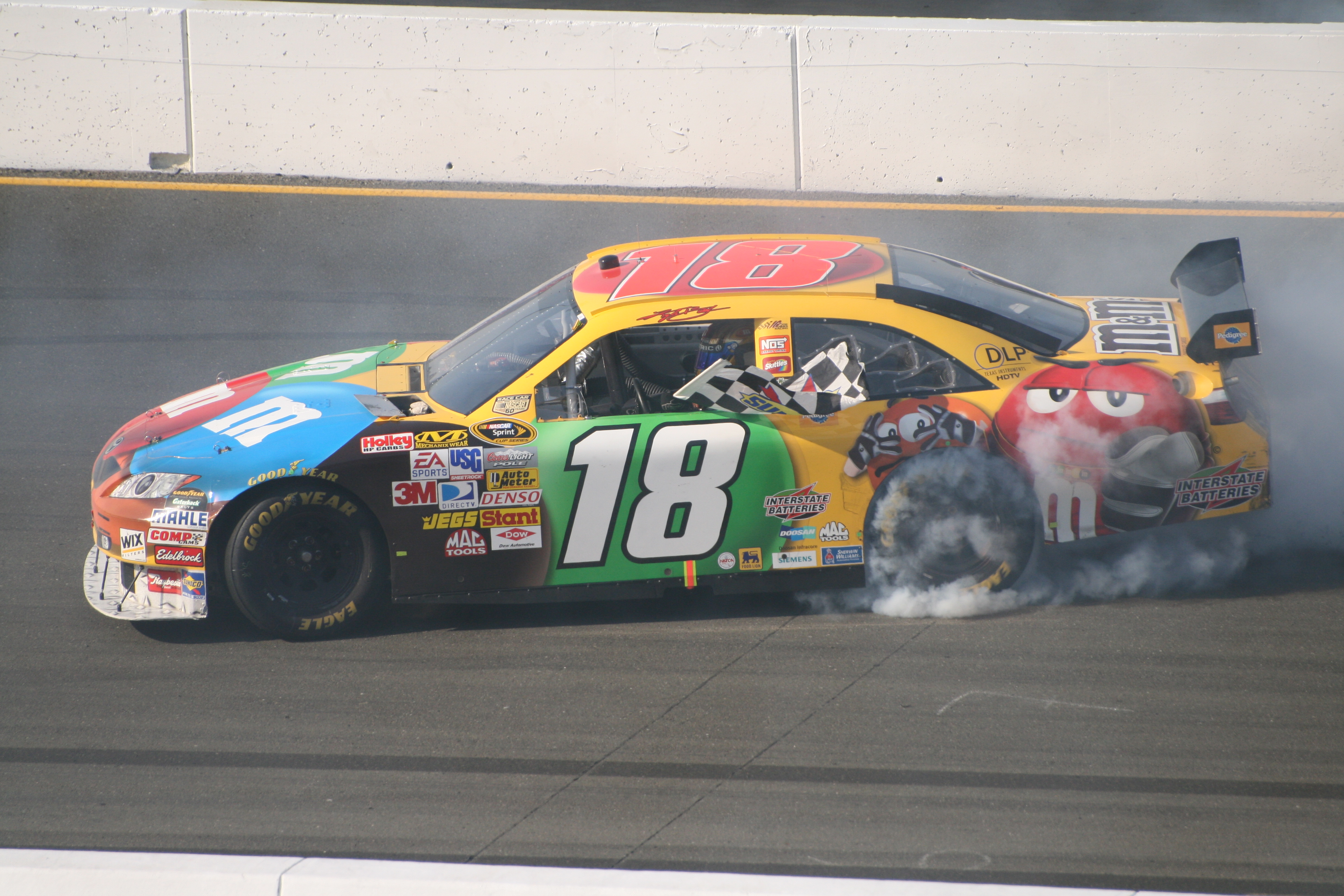
Busch waving the checkered flag after winning the 2008 Toyota/Save Mart 350 at the Sonoma Raceway. The No. 18 car became his signature of his NASCAR Cup Series career.

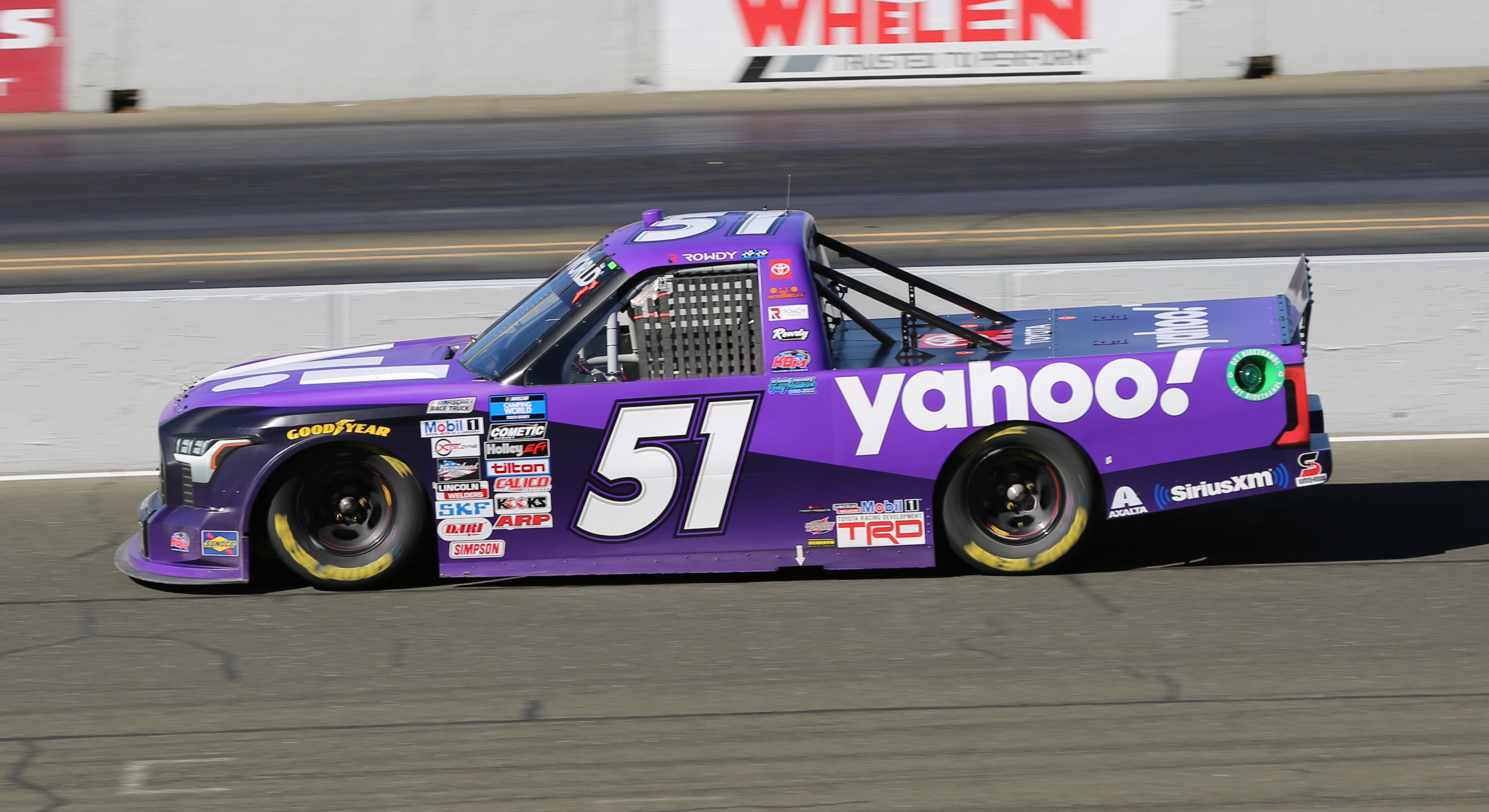
Busch racing his truck at the 2022 DoorDash 250. Busch would eventually become the all-time wins leader in the NASCAR Craftsman Truck Series.

Busch established himself as one of the most accomplished drivers in NASCAR history, holding numerous records across the sport's top divisions. In 2010, he set the modern-era record for most combined victories in a single season in NASCAR's three premier series with 24 wins. He also holds the all-time record for career wins in the national series with 234 victories. Busch set the record for most wins in a season in the Xfinity Series with thirteen in 2010, and holds the overall record with 102 wins. He also has the most wins in the Truck Series with 69. Busch is the only driver in history to have at least 60 career wins in each of NASCAR's top three series. In 2019, he tied the record for consecutive top-ten finishes to start a season, matching Morgan Shepherd's streak of 11. His victory at Auto Club Speedway in 2023 made him the record holder for most consecutive seasons with a win, at nineteen, a streak that ended in 2024 with a winless season.

Just shy of age 20, Busch became NASCAR's youngest-ever pole winner in a Cup Series race at California Speedway in 2005. He also became the youngest driver to qualify for the Chase for the Sprint Cup in 2006. Busch made history as the first driver to win a race and a championship in a Toyota in the Cup Series, claiming victory at Atlanta Motor Speedway in 2008 and securing the 2015 Cup championship. He is the only driver to win four consecutive spring races at Richmond International Raceway (2009–2012) and was the inaugural winner of the first Cup Series race at Kentucky Speedway in 2011.

Busch, who began his NASCAR career in 2003, is one of only six drivers to have won championships in both the Cup Series and Xfinity Series. In 2005, he became the 14th of just 36 drivers to win a race in each of NASCAR's three national series. In 2009, Busch made history as the first driver to win two top-tier NASCAR races on the same day at Auto Club Speedway. In 2010, he became the first driver to win races in all three of NASCAR's top series in the same weekend at Bristol, a feat he repeated at the same track in 2017.

Busch made history by winning the 2009 Crown Royal Presents the Russell Friedman 400 at Richmond International Raceway on his 24th birthday, becoming only the second driver in NASCAR history to win on their birthday. Twelve years later, on his 36th birthday, he captured victory again in the Buschy McBusch Race 400 at Kansas Speedway, joining Cale Yarborough as the only two drivers to win on their birthday twice. In 2010, Kyle Busch Motorsports made an impressive debut, becoming the first Truck Series organization to win the owners' championship in its inaugural season, recording eight wins, 16 top-five finishes, and 21 top-ten finishes.

As of the completion of the 2022 Daytona 500, Busch holds the record for the most lifetime laps led in the history of the race, leading 324 laps, without ever securing a victory in the event.

In December 2021, M&M's/Mars announced it would end its primary sponsorship with Busch and Joe Gibbs Racing after the 2022 season. On September 13, 2022, Busch revealed he had signed a multi-year contract with Richard Childress Racing, beginning in 2023.

The 2026 Go Bowling at The Glen on May 10 marked Busch's final Cup race, where he finished eighth. The Ecosave 200 truck race on May 15 was his final NASCAR win. On May 21, he withdrew from the entry list for the upcoming Coca-Cola 600 due to hospitalization with a severe illness, and died later that day.

== Late model racing ==
Busch maintained an active presence in regional late model stock car racing, frequently competing in events with his own Kyle Busch Motorsports cars. One of his most significant victories came in December 2009 when he won the 42nd Snowball Derby at Five Flags Speedway in Pensacola, Florida. He returned to the event in 2015, winning the last-chance qualifier race, before finishing 19th in the main event. Busch later captured his second Snowball Derby victory in December 2017.

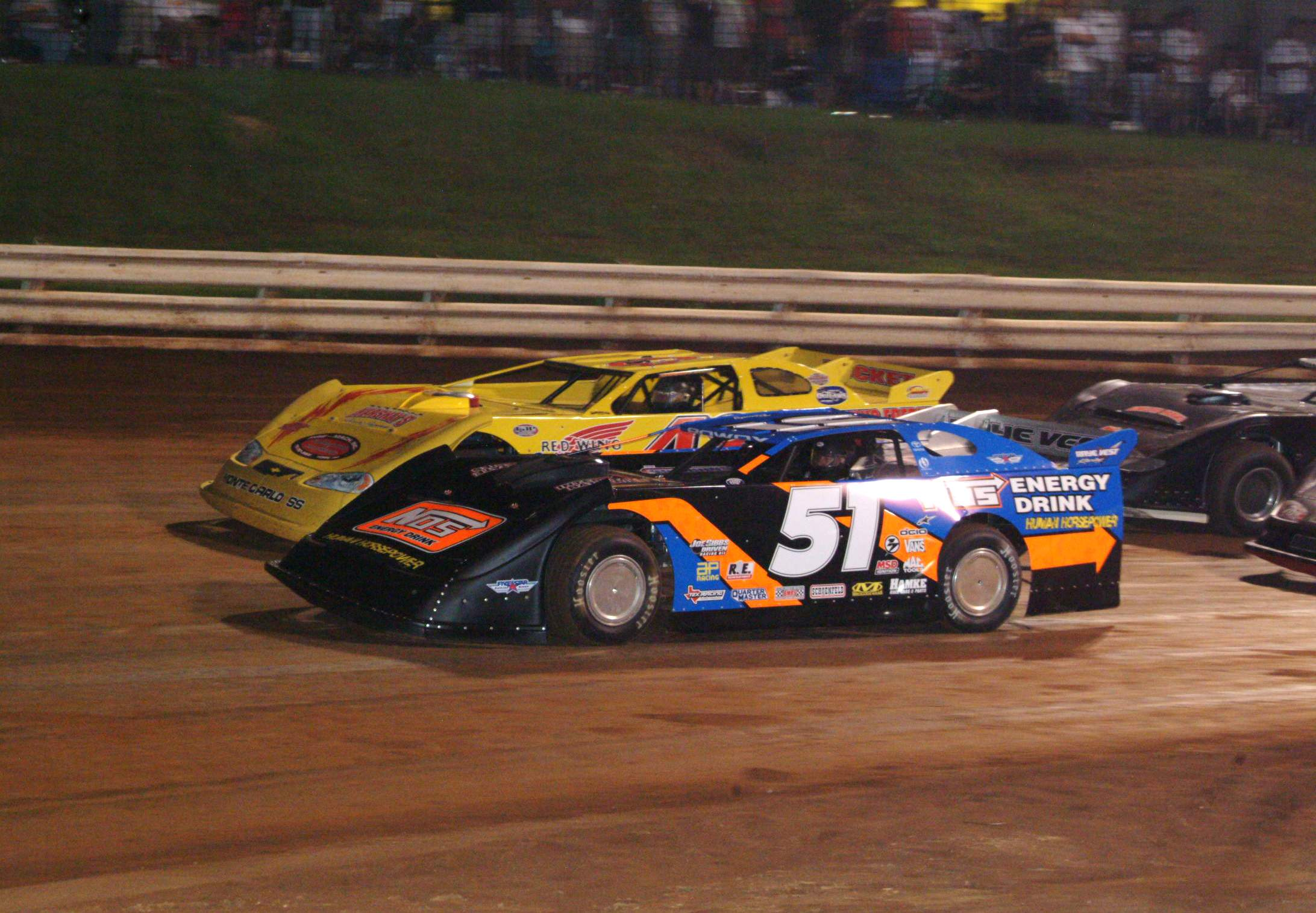
Busch had occasionally competed in dirt late model events, including the 2009 Battle at the Grove charity race at the Williams Grove Speedway.

On July 10, 2011, Busch won the 32nd annual Slinger Nationals at Slinger Speedway in Wisconsin. Two weeks later, he claimed victory in the 38th annual TD Bank 250, presented by New England Dodge Dealers, at Oxford Plains Speedway. This marked his third attempt to win the prestigious event, which is New England's largest short-track race. Busch became only the second active NASCAR Cup Series driver to win the race, joining Kevin Harvick, who achieved the feat in 2008. Reflecting on the victory, Busch said, "I've had this one on my list of big races that I wanted to win and now that I've done it, it feels great—it was everything I thought it would be." Busch also dominated the weekend by winning the preliminary Pro All Star Series Oxford 150 the night before, completing a sweep of the event.

In June 2012, Busch won the eighth annual Prelude to the Dream at Eldora Speedway, defeating Tony Stewart in the pay-per-view all-star event. The following year in July, Busch dominated the Howie Lettow Memorial 150 at the Milwaukee Mile, winning the darkness-shortened event. He led every practice session, set the fastest qualifying time, and outpaced defending race winner Travis Sauter and NASCAR Truck Series regular Johnny Sauter in the 43-car field.

== Other racing ==
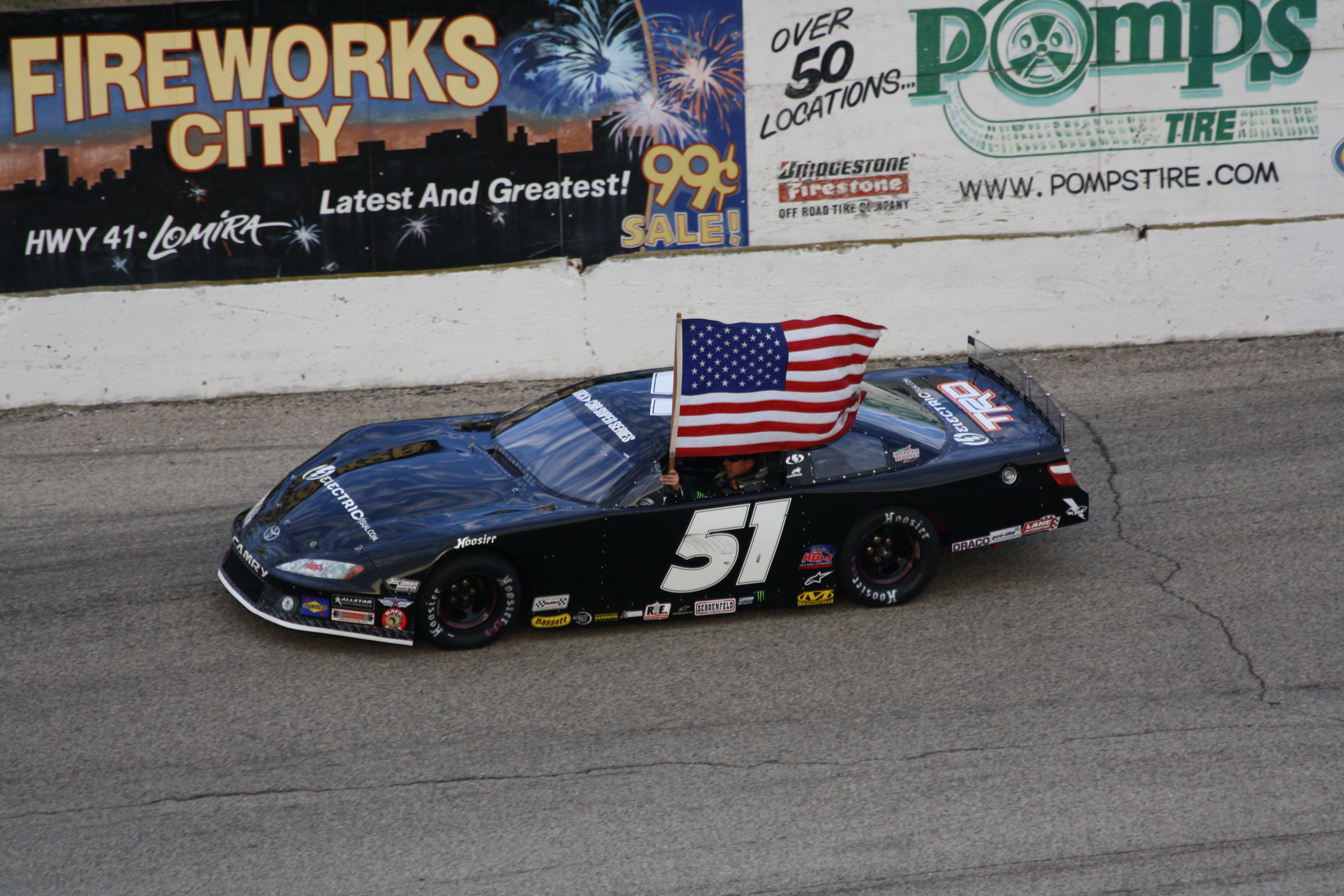
Busch also raced in super late model competition, such as the 2012 Slinger Nationals at the Slinger Super Speedway, at which he won the pole position.

Busch was among several American drivers considered to drive for the US-based Formula One team, US F1. However, he declined the offer, citing poor timing. The team ultimately folded due to economic issues before ever competing in a race. Busch was scheduled to test drive a Toyota F1 car at the end of the 2008 racing season but declined due to the obligatory 2008 Nationwide Series banquet. He tried short course off-road racing in 2010 at the Route 66 Raceway Off-Road Championship, but retired after two laps with a broken rear suspension.

In 2020, Busch competed in the 24 Hours of Daytona with AIM Vasser Sullivan, driving a Lexus RC F GT3 alongside Jack Hawksworth, Parker Chase, and Michael De Quesada. He contributed four and a half hours behind the wheel, helping the team secure a ninth-place finish in the GTD class and 26th overall. Nitrocross, a rallycross series founded by former NASCAR driver Travis Pastrana, invited Busch to compete in the November 2021 race weekend at Firebird Motorsports Park. He placed fourth in the Supercar Final behind winner Pastrana.

In 2023, Busch competed in the Superstar Racing Experience (SRX) at Motor Mile Speedway on July 27 and Berlin Raceway on August 3. At Motor Mile, he battled Tony Stewart and Clint Bowyer for the win in the closing laps, ultimately taking the checkered flag. A week later at Berlin Raceway, he secured another victory, going 2-for-2 in the series. The following year, on November 14, Busch announced that he would run the Chili Bowl Nationals in January 2025. He finished third in the second F-feature, but failed to qualify for the D-feature after finishing fifteenth in the second F-feature and starting from the back of the pack.

== Personal life ==
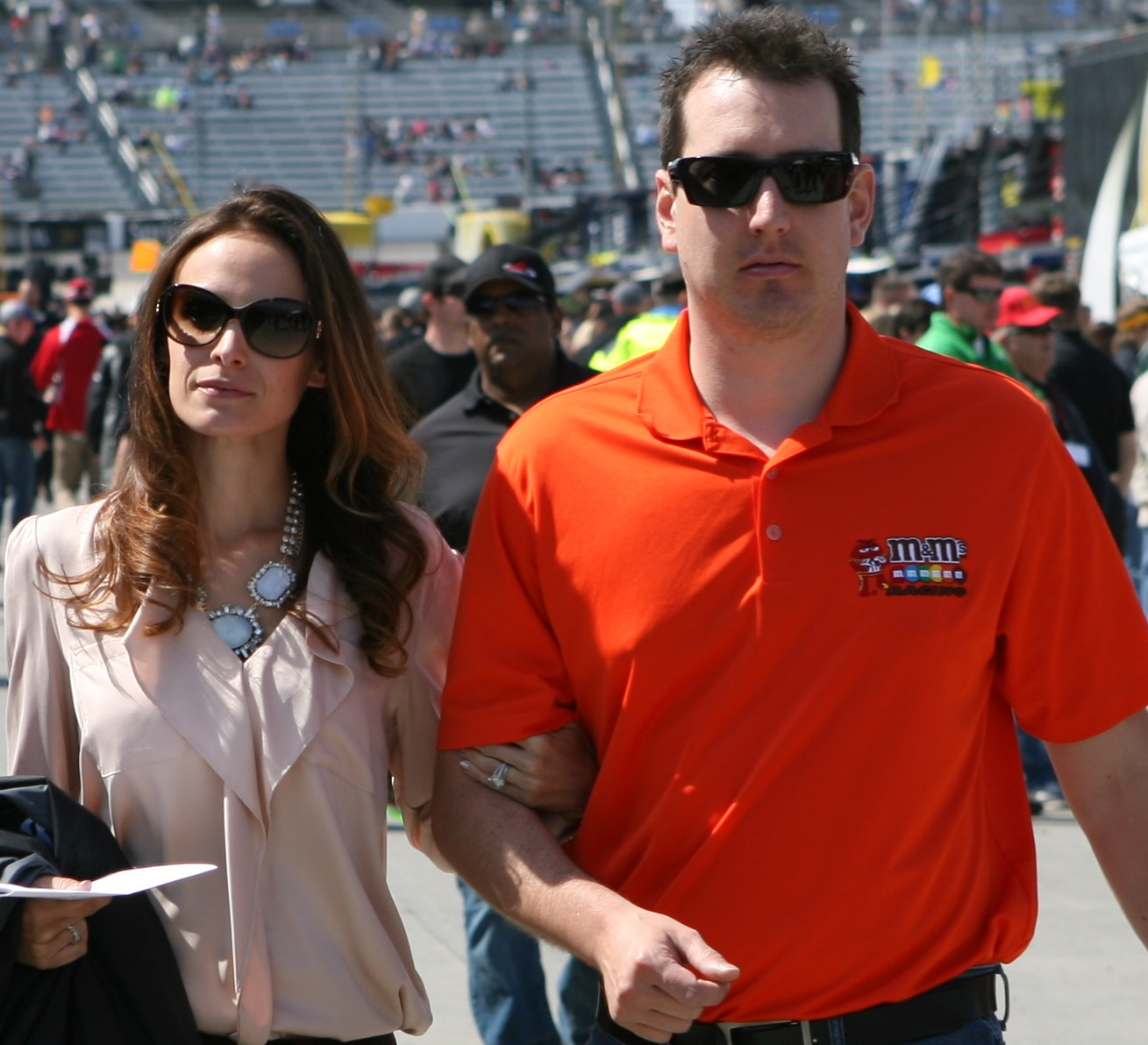
Busch and his wife Samantha in 2013

Busch married Samantha Sarcinella on December 31, 2010, in Chicago, in a one-hour feature on the Esquire Network. Sarcinella, a native of St. John, Indiana, graduated from Purdue University with a degree in psychology. The couple had two children: a son born in 2015 and a daughter born in 2022. Busch's son, Brexton, has become a winning racing driver.

=== Legal issues ===
On May 24, 2011, Busch was cited for reckless driving and speeding near Troutman, North Carolina, after driving 128 mph (206 km/h) in a 45 mph (72 km/h) zone while test-driving a Lexus LFA. He later apologized, admitting he had gotten "carried away." On August 23, 2011, he pleaded guilty to speeding and received a $1,000 fine, a 45-day license suspension, 30 hours of community service, and one year of unsupervised probation.

On April 29, 2014, Busch was cited for driving 60 mph (97 km/h) in a 45 mph (72 km/h) zone on NC 73 in Denver, North Carolina. He said he believed the speed limit was 55 mph (89 km/h).

On February 6, 2023, news reports revealed that Busch had been arrested in Cancún, Mexico, in January for handgun possession. According to the prosecutor, Busch was sentenced to 42 months in prison and fined US$1,100, though details about how the sentence would be served were not disclosed. Busch later issued a statement apologizing for his lack of awareness of Mexican laws and said he considered the matter resolved.

== In popular culture ==
Busch appeared in multiple racing video games, including as a cover driver in NASCAR Kart Racing and NASCAR Heat 2, the latter of which came after winning the 2017 Monster Energy NASCAR All-Star Race cover competition. He is also a playable driver in Forza Motorsport 6 through the NASCAR expansion pack, which includes his No. 18 Toyota Camry with M&M's/Interstate Batteries sponsorship. In addition, alongside Chase Elliott and Jimmie Johnson, Busch provided commentary in the expansion as one of the "voices of motorsport."

In filmography and television, Busch made a cameo appearance as a West Virginia state trooper in the 2017 comedy film Logan Lucky. That same year, he appeared as a celebrity contestant on The $100,000 Pyramid. When his wife starred in the 2019 CMT reality TV series Racing Wives, he was seen in some shots. In 2022, an American documentary titled Rowdy was focused on his life and NASCAR career.

Busch was a fan of professional wrestling. He appeared on WWE programming multiple times, including guest hosting Monday Night Raw in the October 26, 2009 episode with Joey Logano. A month later in November for the O'Reilly Auto Parts Challenge at the Texas Motor Speedway, both Busch and Logano raced in special paint schemes promoting the WWE SmackDown vs. Raw 2010 video game. Busch returned to the WWE on December 2, 2019, during which he briefly won the WWE 24/7 Championship by pinning R-Truth, with Michael Waltrip serving as guest referee. R-Truth later reclaimed the title that night.

== Other ventures ==
=== Rowdy Energy ===
Rowdy Energy
- Type: Private
- Industry: Drink industry
- Founded: January 30, 2019; 7 years ago in Del Mar, California, U.S.
- Founders: Kyle Busch; Jeff Church
- Defunct: 2024
- Headquarters: San Diego, California, U.S.
- Products: Energy drink
- Owners: Kyle Busch; Jeff Church
- Parent: Rowdy Beverage, Inc
- Website: www.kylebusch.com

Rowdy Energy was an energy drink company based in Del Mar, California founded in 2019 by Busch and beverage entrepreneur Jeff Church.

The first batch of the drink was produced in January 2020, with ten flavors available online, including seven sugar-free, Keto-certified options. The traditional drinks contained 60% less sugar than other popular energy drinks.

Rowdy branding first appeared at the 2020 24 Hours of Daytona when Busch was seen with a Cherry Limeade can and wearing a Rowdy Energy hat. The logo also appeared on his Daytona 500 helmet, and Busch drank a Rowdy Energy after his race exit. Rowdy Energy is listed as an associate partner on KyleBusch.com. In late 2020, the brand sponsored Formula D driver Ken Gushi. It also sponsored races like the Southern Super Series' Rowdy Energy Twin 100s at Five Flags Speedway and Sprint car racing's the TRD KKBM Giveback Classic. Additionally, Rowdy Energy sponsored sprint and midget car driver Rico Abreu.

On January 10, 2024, Busch announced that Rowdy Energy had ceased operations and closed its doors in the following weeks.

=== Auto Dealerships ===
Kyle Busch, along with Dennis & Co., partnered to acquire the Hawthorne Chevrolet franchise in New Jersey in May 2024. Busch later partnered with Boyd Automotive to purchase the OBX Chevrolet franchise in Kitty Hawk, NC.

=== Philanthropy ===
In 2006, Busch established the Kyle Busch Foundation after visiting the St. John's Home in Grand Rapids, Michigan. The Foundation focuses on providing essential resources to underprivileged children across the United States. In 2008, Busch launched the "Kyle's Miles" program in partnership with Pedigree to support dogs in shelters and breed rescue organizations.

After winning his first Cup Series race at California on September 4, 2005, Busch and team owner Rick Hendrick donated their winnings to the American Red Cross to support Hurricane Katrina relief efforts. Busch announced the donation during an appearance on The Oprah Winfrey Show, which drew widespread praise.

== Death ==
On May 21, 2026, Busch's family announced that he had been hospitalized with a sudden and severe illness, which forced him to withdraw from the upcoming 2026 North Carolina Education Lottery 200 and the 2026 Coca-Cola 600 at Charlotte Motor Speedway. He died later that day at age 41.

Busch had been experiencing a sinus cold during the Cup Series race at Watkins Glen International on May 10. On May 16, he said that he was still experiencing symptoms and described his cough as "substantial". The AP reported that Busch became unresponsive on May 20 while testing in Chevrolet's Driver in the Loop (DIL) Simulator at the GM Technical Center in Concord, North Carolina, and was taken to the hospital. Reports based on a 911 call stated that he had been having difficulty breathing and was coughing up blood. On May 23, it was revealed that Busch had contracted pneumonia that eventually progressed into sepsis, which led to hemorrhagic shock and disseminated intravascular coagulation, his cause of death.

=== Reactions ===
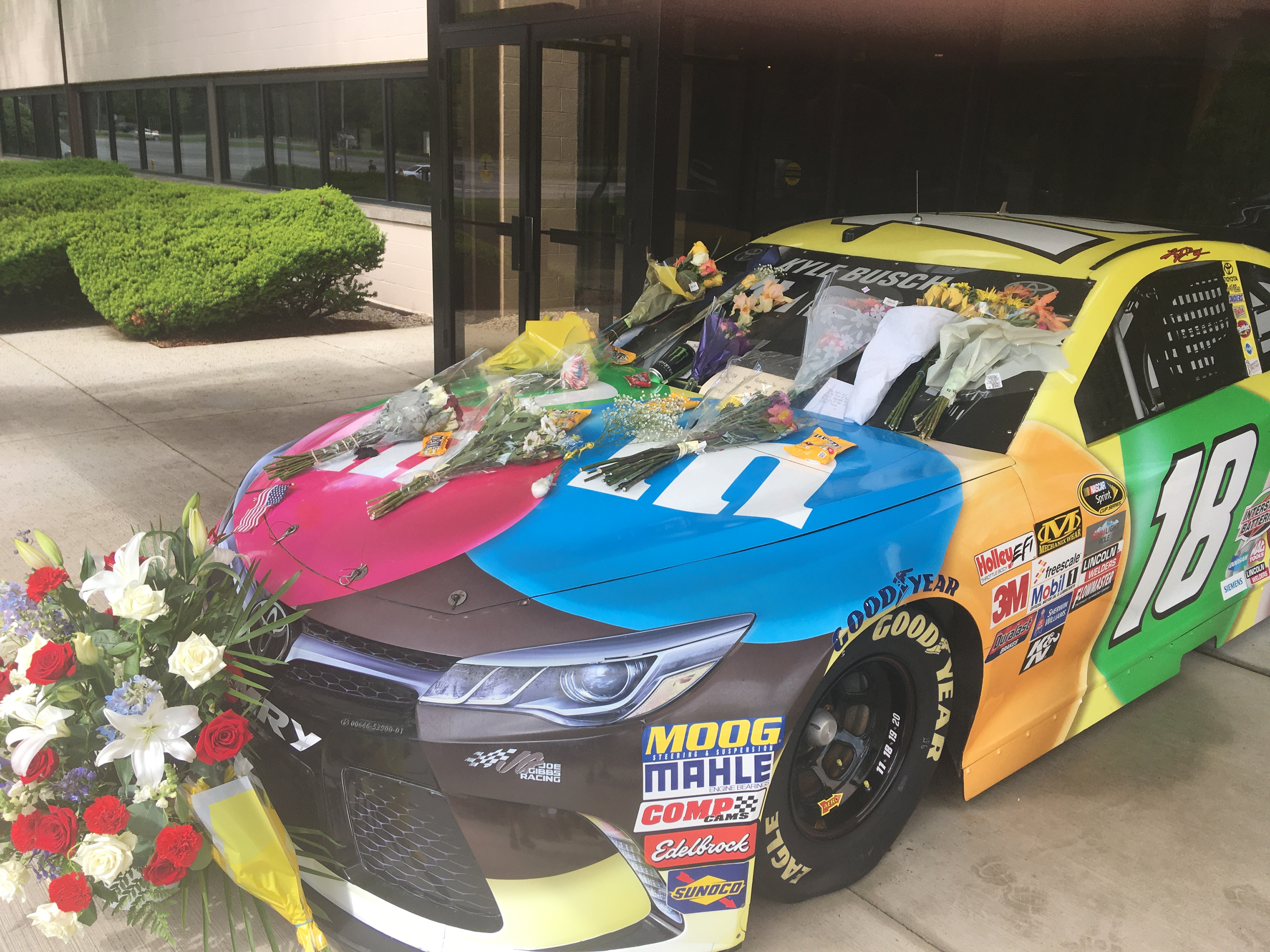
After Busch's death, flowers were placed on his car at the headquarters of sponsor Mars Wrigley

Following the news of his death, fans created a memorial at the Richard Childress Racing museum. Numerous drivers issued statements, and multiple politicians and public figures posted tributes.

Richard Childress Racing released a statement the next day announcing that Busch's No. 8 car, which had been scheduled to be driven by Austin Hill that weekend, would be renumbered as the No. 33. The team added that the No. 8 would be reserved for Busch's son, Brexton Busch, should he compete in NASCAR in the future. NASCAR also removed Busch from the 2026 Cup points standings, but would later reverse this decision after the season's end.

=== NASCAR tributes ===
A memorial rock with Busch's bow engraved on it at Las Vegas Motor Speedway

Before the Truck race in Charlotte, both Spire Motorsports and Kaulig Racing added the Kyle Busch Motorsports logo to their trucks. Each entered car had a No. 8 decal on it in Busch's memory. Throughout the race weekend, the lower-series winning drivers (Ross Chastain and Layne Riggs) performed his signature bow.

During the opening ceremony for the Coca-Cola 600, Busch's family were honored on the frontstretch by NASCAR CEO Steve O'Donnell. CMS displayed Busch's No. 8 decal and signature on the frontstretch grass; Kurt laid eight flowers on the number. During the race, the cars formed the "missing man formation" during the pace lap, and a moment of silence was observed on lap 8. Former teammate Daniel Suárez won the race and dedicated it to Busch; Suárez was driving the No. 7 for Spire Motorsports, the number and team Busch won with for his final career NASCAR victory in the Truck Series race at Dover.

Two weeks after his death, longtime teammate Denny Hamlin tied Busch in wins at Michigan. During Hamlin's victory burnout, Hamlin waved a special flag in memoriam utilizing the font of the "1" from JGR's No. 18 as well as RCR's No. 8. On August 13, 2026, Ty Gibbs' No. 54 team announced a throwback to Busch's M&M's No. 18 car to be run in remembrance of Busch at Bristol. NASCAR recognized "Kyle Busch Day" on August 18 (or "8-18") as a nod to his two most prominent car numbers.

Busch was posthumously awarded the Most Popular Driver Award that November, Chase Elliott, the winner of eight straight of the award, withdrew his name from contention. Many drivers, such as Kyle Larson and Carson Hocevar also made statements to encourage their fans to vote for Busch.

=== Other ===
Brexton Busch doing his fathers celebratory bow after completing a burnout in the car Kyle made his last Cup Series start in, at his Celebration of Life at Charlotte Motor Speedway in October 2026.

During the 2026 Indianapolis 500, Romain Grosjean's car would feature Busch's iconic No. 18 font. The race held a moment of silence on lap 18, with Busch on the scoring pylon. After winning the Italian motorcycle Grand Prix sprint, Raúl Fernández had a Busch sticker riding with him to his win.

The Carolina Hurricanes and Vegas Golden Knights of the National Hockey League both held a moment of silence during their next scheduled home games on May 21 and 24, respectively.

Addison McDowell, a United States Representative from North Carolina, gave a tribute statement to Busch while speaking on the floor on June 9. The Senate also passed a bipartisan resolution on June 19 in his honor; the resolution was sponsored by Republicans Ted Budd and Thom Tillis alongside Democrats Catherine Cortez Masto and Jacky Rosen.

== Motorsports career results ==
=== NASCAR ===
(key) (Bold – Pole position awarded by qualifying time. Italics – Pole position earned by points standings or practice time. * – Most laps led. ** – All laps led.)

==== Cup Series ====
NASCAR Cup Series results
Year	Team	No.	Make	1	2	3	4	5	6	7	8	9	10	11	12	13	14	15	16	17	18	19	20	21	22	23	24	25	26	27	28	29	30	31	32	33	34	35	36	NCSC	Pts	Ref
2003	Hendrick Motorsports	60	Chevy	DAY	CAR	LVS	ATL	DAR	BRI	TEX	TAL	MAR	CAL	RCH	CLT	DOV	POC	MCH	SON	DAY	CHI	NHA	POC	IND	GLN	MCH	BRI	DAR	RCH	NHA	DOV	TAL	KAN	CLT	MAR	ATL	PHO	CAR	HOM; Wth	N/A	—	
2004	Hendrick Motorsports	84	Chevy	DAY	CAR	LVS; 41	ATL	DAR	BRI	TEX; DNQ	MAR	TAL	CAL	RCH	CLT; 32	DOV	POC	MCH	SON	DAY	CHI	NHA; DNQ	POC	IND	GLN	MCH; DNQ	BRI	CAL; 24	RCH	NHA	DOV	TAL	KAN; 37	CLT; 34	MAR	ATL; 43	PHO	DAR	HOM	52nd	345	
2005	Hendrick Motorsports	5	Chevy	DAY; 38	**CAL**; 23	LVS; 2	ATL; 12	BRI; 28	MAR; 39	TEX; 21	PHO; 8	TAL; 41	DAR; 23	RCH; 4	CLT; 25	DOV; 2	POC; 4	MCH; 9	SON; 40	DAY; 31	CHI; 14	NHA; 4	POC; 39	IND; 10	GLN; 33	MCH; 43	BRI; 33	CAL; 1*	RCH; 4	NHA; 27	DOV; 2	TAL; 33	KAN; 21	CLT; 39	MAR; 9	ATL; 12	TEX; 40	PHO; 1	HOM; 41	20th	3753	
2006	Hendrick Motorsports	5	Chevy	DAY; 23	CAL; 10	LVS; 3	ATL; 12	BRI; 8	MAR; 5	TEX; 15	**PHO**; 36	TAL; 32	RCH; 5	DAR; 7	CLT; 38	DOV; 5	POC; 22	MCH; 14	SON; 11	DAY; 2	CHI; 3	NHA; 1*	POC; 12	IND; 7	GLN; 9	MCH; 39	BRI; 2	CAL; 8	RCH; 2*	NHA; 38	DOV; 40	KAN; 7	TAL; 11	CLT; 6	MAR; 18	ATL; 27	TEX; 4	PHO; 38	HOM; 38	10th	6027	
2007	Hendrick Motorsports	5	Chevy	DAY; 24	CAL; 9	LVS; 9	ATL; 32	BRI; 1	MAR; 4	TEX; 37	PHO; 7	TAL; 37	RCH; 2	DAR; 37	CLT; 30	DOV; 17	POC; 8	MCH; 6	SON; 8	NHA; 11	DAY; 2	CHI; 13	IND; 4	POC; 12	GLN; 7	MCH; 13	BRI; 9	CAL; 3*	RCH; 20	NHA; 4	DOV; 5	KAN; 41	TAL; 36	CLT; 3	MAR; 4	ATL; 20	TEX; 4*	PHO; 8	HOM; 20	5th	6293	
2008	Joe Gibbs Racing	18	Toyota	DAY; 4*	CAL; 4	**LVS**; 11	ATL; 1*	BRI; 17	MAR; 38	TEX; 3	PHO; 10	TAL; 1	RCH; 2	DAR; 1*	**CLT**; 3	DOV; 1	POC; 43	MCH; 13	SON; 1*	NHA; 25	DAY; 1	CHI; 1*	IND; 15	POC; 36	GLN; 1*	MCH; 2	BRI; 2*	CAL; 7	RCH; 15	NHA; 34	DOV; 43	KAN; 28	TAL; 15	CLT; 4	MAR; 29	ATL; 5	TEX; 6	PHO; 8	HOM; 19	10th	6186	
2009	Joe Gibbs Racing	18	Toyota	DAY; 41*	CAL; 3	**LVS**; 1	ATL; 18	BRI; 1*	MAR; 24	TEX; 18	PHO; 17	TAL; 25*	RCH; 1	DAR; 34	CLT; 6*	DOV; 23	POC; 22	MCH; 13	SON; 22	NHA; 7	DAY; 14	CHI; 33	IND; 38	POC; 16	GLN; 4	MCH; 23	BRI; 1	ATL; 13	RCH; 5	NHA; 5	DOV; 31	KAN; 12	CAL; 24	CLT; 8	MAR; 4	TAL; 15	TEX; 11*	PHO; 12	HOM; 8	13th	4457	
2010	Joe Gibbs Racing	18	Toyota	DAY; 14	CAL; 14	LVS; 15	ATL; 25	BRI; 9	MAR; 22	PHO; 8*	TEX; 3	TAL; 9	**RCH**; 1*	DAR; 7	DOV; 1	CLT; 3	**POC**; 2	MCH; 20	SON; 39	NHA; 11	DAY; 40	CHI; 17	IND; 8	POC; 23	GLN; 8	MCH; 18	BRI; 1*	ATL; 5	RCH; 2	NHA; 9	DOV; 6	KAN; 21	CAL; 35	CLT; 2*	MAR; 4	TAL; 25	TEX; 32	PHO; 13	HOM; 32	8th	6182	
2011	Joe Gibbs Racing	18	Toyota	DAY; 8	PHO; 2	LVS; 38	BRI; 1	CAL; 3*	MAR; 3*	TEX; 16	TAL; 35	RCH; 1*	DAR; 11	DOV; 4	CLT; 32	KAN; 12	POC; 3	MCH; 3	SON; 11	DAY; 5	KEN; 1*	NHA; 36	IND; 10	POC; 2	**GLN**; 3*	MCH; 1	BRI; 14	ATL; 23	RCH; 6	CHI; 22	NHA; 11	DOV; 6	KAN; 11	CLT; 2*	TAL; 33	MAR; 27*	TEX; QL^{†}	PHO; 36	HOM; 23	12th	2246	
2012	Joe Gibbs Racing	18	Toyota	DAY; 17	PHO; 6	LVS; 23	BRI; 32	CAL; 2*	MAR; 36	TEX; 11	KAN; 10	RCH; 1	TAL; 2	DAR; 4	CLT; 3	DOV; 29	POC; 30	MCH; 32	SON; 17	KEN; 10*	DAY; 24	**NHA**; 16	IND; 2	POC; 33	GLN; 7*	MCH; 13	BRI; 6	ATL; 6	RCH; 16	CHI; 4	NHA; 28	DOV; 7*	TAL; 3	CLT; 5	KAN; 31	MAR; 2	TEX; 3	**PHO**; 3*	HOM; 4*	13th	1133	
2013	Joe Gibbs Racing	18	Toyota	DAY; 34	PHO; 23	LVS; 4	**BRI**; 2	CAL; 1*	MAR; 5	**TEX**; 1*	KAN; 38	RCH; 24	TAL; 37	DAR; 6*	CLT; 38	DOV; 4*	POC; 6	MCH; 4	SON; 35	KEN; 5	**DAY**; 12	NHA; 2	IND; 10	POC; 8	GLN; 1	MCH; 31	BRI; 11	ATL; 1	RCH; 19	CHI; 2	NHA; 2	DOV; 5	KAN; 34	CLT; 5	TAL; 5	MAR; 15	TEX; 13	PHO; 7	HOM; 7	4th	2364	
2014	Joe Gibbs Racing	18	Toyota	DAY; 19	PHO; 9	LVS; 11	BRI; 29	CAL; 1	**MAR**; 14	TEX; 3	DAR; 6	RCH; 3	TAL; 12	KAN; 15	CLT; 9	DOV; 42	POC; 12	MCH; 41	SON; 25	KEN; 2	DAY; 28	**NHA**; 2	IND; 2	POC; 42	GLN; 40	MCH; 39	BRI; 36	ATL; 16	RCH; 14	CHI; 7	NHA; 8	DOV; 10	KAN; 3	**CLT**; 5	TAL; 40	MAR; 11	TEX; 4	PHO; 34	HOM; 39	10th	2285	
2015	Joe Gibbs Racing	18	Toyota	DAY; INQ^{‡}	ATL	LVS	PHO	CAL	MAR	TEX	BRI	RCH	TAL	KAN	CLT; 11	DOV; 36	POC; 9	MCH; 43	SON; 1	DAY; 17	KEN; 1*	NHA; 1	IND; 1	**POC**; 21	GLN; 2	MCH; 11	BRI; 8*	DAR; 7	RCH; 2	CHI; 9*	NHA; 37	DOV; 2	CLT; 20	KAN; 5	TAL; 11	MAR; 5	TEX; 4	PHO; 4	HOM; 1	1st	5043	
2016	Joe Gibbs Racing	18	Toyota	DAY; 3	ATL; 3	LVS; 4	**PHO**; 4	CAL; 25	MAR; 1*	TEX; 1	BRI; 38	RCH; 2	TAL; 2	KAN; 1	DOV; 30	CLT; 33	POC; 31	MCH; 40	SON; 7	DAY; 2	KEN; 12	NHA; 8*	**IND**; 1*	POC; 9	GLN; 6	BRI; 39*	MCH; 19	DAR; 11	RCH; 9	CHI; 8	NHA; 3	DOV; 2	CLT; 6	KAN; 5	TAL; 30	MAR; 5	TEX; 5	PHO; 2	HOM; 6	3rd	5035	
2017	Joe Gibbs Racing	18	Toyota	DAY; 38	ATL; 16	LVS; 22	PHO; 3*	CAL; 8	MAR; 2*	TEX; 15	BRI; 35	RCH; 16	TAL; 3*	KAN; 5	CLT; 2	**DOV**; 16	**POC**; 9*	MCH; 7	SON; 5	DAY; 20	**KEN**; 5	NHA; 12	**IND**; 34*	**POC**; 1*	**GLN**; 7	MCH; 10	BRI; 1	DAR; 2	RCH; 9	**CHI**; 15*	**NHA**; 1*	DOV; 1	CLT; 29	TAL; 27	KAN; 10*	MAR; 1*	TEX; 19	PHO; 7	HOM; 2	2nd	5035	
2018	Joe Gibbs Racing	18	Toyota	DAY; 25	**ATL**; 7	LVS; 2	PHO; 2*	CAL; 3	MAR; 2	TEX; 1*	**BRI**; 1	RCH; 1	TAL; 13	DOV; 35	KAN; 10	**CLT**; 1*	POC; 3	MCH; 4	SON; 5	CHI; 1	DAY; 33	KEN; 4	NHA; 2	POC; 1*	GLN; 3	MCH; 3	BRI; 20	DAR; 7	IND; 8	LVS; 7	RCH; 1	ROV; 32	DOV; 8	TAL; 26	KAN; 2	**MAR**; 4	TEX; 17	PHO; 1*	HOM; 4	4th	5033	
2019	Joe Gibbs Racing	18	Toyota	DAY; 2	ATL; 6	LVS; 3	PHO; 1*	CAL; 1*	MAR; 3	TEX; 10*	BRI; 1	RCH; 8	TAL; 10	DOV; 10	KAN; 30	CLT; 3	POC; 1*	MCH; 5	SON; 2	CHI; 22	DAY; 14	KEN; 2*	NHA; 8*	POC; 9	GLN; 11	MCH; 6	BRI; 4	DAR; 3*	IND; 37	LVS; 19	RCH; 2*	ROV; 37	DOV; 6	TAL; 19	KAN; 3	MAR; 14	TEX; 7	**PHO**; 2	HOM; 1*	1st	5040	
2020	Joe Gibbs Racing	18	Toyota	DAY; 34	LVS; 15	CAL; 2	PHO; 3	DAR; 26	DAR; 2	CLT; 4	CLT; 29	BRI; 4	ATL; 2	MAR; 19	HOM; 6	TAL; 32	POC; 5	POC; 38	IND; 6	KEN; 21	TEX; 4	KAN; 11	NHA; 38	MCH; 5	MCH; 4	DRC; 37	DOV; 3	DOV; 11	DAY; 33	DAR; 7	RCH; 6	BRI; 2	LVS; 6	TAL; 27	ROV; 30	KAN; 5	TEX; 1*	MAR; 9	PHO; 11	8th	2341	
2021	Joe Gibbs Racing	18	Toyota	DAY; 14	DRC; 35	HOM; 10	LVS; 3	PHO; 25	ATL; 5	BRD; 17	MAR; 10	RCH; 8	TAL; 18	KAN; 1	DAR; 3	DOV; 27	COA; 10	CLT; 3	SON; 5	NSH; 11	POC; 2*	POC; 1	ROA; 3	ATL; 2	NHA; 37	GLN; 4	IRC; 20	MCH; 7	DAY; 34	DAR; 35	RCH; 9	BRI; 21	LVS; 3	TAL; 27	ROV; 4	TEX; 8	KAN; 28	MAR; 2	PHO; 7	9th	2318	
2022	Joe Gibbs Racing	18	Toyota	DAY; 6	CAL; 14	LVS; 4	PHO; 7	ATL; 33	COA; 28	RCH; 9	MAR; 7	BRD; 1	TAL; 3	DOV; 7*	DAR; 33	KAN; 3	CLT; 2	GTW; 2*	SON; 30	NSH; 21	ROA; 29	ATL; 20	NHA; 12	POC; 36*	IRC; 11	MCH; 36	RCH; 9	GLN; 32	DAY; 10	DAR; 30*	KAN; 26	BRI; 34	TEX; 36	TAL; 20	ROV; 3	LVS; 3	HOM; 9	MAR; 29	PHO; 7	13th	2224	
2023	Richard Childress Racing	8	Chevy	DAY; 19	CAL; 1	LVS; 14	PHO; 8	ATL; 10	COA; 2	RCH; 14	BRD; 32	MAR; 21	TAL; 1	DOV; 21	KAN; 35	DAR; 7	CLT; 6	**GTW**; 1*	SON; 2	NSH; 9	CSC; 5	ATL; 5	NHA; 36	POC; 21	RCH; 3	MCH; 37	IRC; 36	GLN; 14	DAY; 7	DAR; 11	KAN; 7	BRI; 20	TEX; 34	TAL; 25	ROV; 3	LVS; 3	HOM; 18	MAR; 27	PHO; 25	14th	2232	
2024	Richard Childress Racing	8	Chevy	DAY; 12	ATL; 3	LVS; 26	PHO; 22	BRI; 25	COA; 9	RCH; 20	MAR; 16	TEX; 9	TAL; 26	**DOV**; 4	KAN; 8	DAR; 27	CLT; 15	GTW; 35	SON; 12	IOW; 35	NHA; 35	NSH; 27	CSC; 9	POC; 32	IND; 25	RCH; 12	MCH; 4	DAY; 2	DAR; 2	ATL; 7	GLN; 30	BRI; 25	KAN; 19	TAL; 19	ROV; 13	LVS; 13	HOM; 31	MAR; 28	PHO; 21	20th	766	
2025	Richard Childress Racing	8	Chevy	DAY; 34	ATL; 7	COA; 5*	PHO; 8	LVS; 33	HOM; 21	MAR; 17	DAR; 10	BRI; 14	TAL; 27	TEX; 20	KAN; 21	CLT; 15	NSH; 12	MCH; 8	MXC; 37	POC; 20	ATL; 21	CSC; 5	SON; 10	DOV; 11	IND; 25	IOW; 20	GLN; 22	RCH; 16	DAY; 33	DAR; 8	GTW; 22	BRI; 16	NHA; 30	KAN; 19	ROV; 34	LVS; 8	TAL; 19	MAR; 13	PHO; 5	21st	737	
2026	Richard Childress Racing	8	Chevy	**DAY**; 15	ATL; 34	COA; 12	PHO; 17	LVS; 28	DAR; 21	MAR; 24	BRI; 25	KAN; 35	TAL; 10	TEX; 20	GLN; 8	CLT; Wth	NSH	MCH	POC	COR	SON	CHI	ATL	NWS	IND	IOW	RCH	NHA	DAY	DAR	GTW	BRI	KAN	LVS	CLT	PHO	TAL	MAR	HOM	36th	217	
^{†} – Qualified but replaced by Michael McDowell · ^{‡} – Qualified but replaced by Matt Crafton

===== Daytona 500 =====
Year	Team	Manufacturer	Start	Finish
2005	Hendrick Motorsports	Chevrolet	19	38
2006	Hendrick Motorsports	Chevrolet	4	23
2007	Hendrick Motorsports	Chevrolet	8	24
2008	Joe Gibbs Racing	Toyota	24	4*
2009	Joe Gibbs Racing	Toyota	4	41*
2010	Joe Gibbs Racing	Toyota	7	14
2011	Joe Gibbs Racing	Toyota	10	8
2012	Joe Gibbs Racing	Toyota	14	17
2013	Joe Gibbs Racing	Toyota	4	34
2014	Joe Gibbs Racing	Toyota	37	19
2015	Joe Gibbs Racing	Toyota	INQ^{†}	
2016	Joe Gibbs Racing	Toyota	4	3
2017	Joe Gibbs Racing	Toyota	21	38
2018	Joe Gibbs Racing	Toyota	12	25
2019	Joe Gibbs Racing	Toyota	31	2
2020	Joe Gibbs Racing	Toyota	28	34
2021	Joe Gibbs Racing	Toyota	10	14
2022	Joe Gibbs Racing	Toyota	10	6
2023	Richard Childress Racing	Chevrolet	36	19
2024	Richard Childress Racing	Chevrolet	34	12
2025	Richard Childress Racing	Chevrolet	21	34
2026	Richard Childress Racing	Chevrolet	**1**	15
^{†} – Qualified but replaced by Matt Crafton

==== Xfinity Series ====
NASCAR Xfinity Series results
Year	Team	No.	Make	1	2	3	4	5	6	7	8	9	10	11	12	13	14	15	16	17	18	19	20	21	22	23	24	25	26	27	28	29	30	31	32	33	34	35	NXSC	Pts	Ref
2003	Hendrick Motorsports	87	Chevy	DAY	CAR	LVS	DAR	BRI	TEX	TAL	NSH	CAL	RCH	GTW	NZH	CLT; 2	DOV	NSH	KEN	MLW	DAY	CHI	NHA	PPR	IRP; 33	MCH	BRI	DAR; 2	RCH	DOV; 15	KAN	CLT	MEM; 16	ATL; 43	PHO	CAR; 7	HOM		48th	827	
2004	Hendrick Motorsports	5	Chevy	DAY; 24	CAR; 7	LVS; 15	**DAR**; 17	BRI; 3	**TEX**; 2*	NSH; 6	TAL; 4	CAL; 7	GTW; 5	**RCH**; 1*	**NZH**; 10	CLT; 1*	DOV; 5	NSH; 17	KEN; 1	MLW; 16	DAY; 11	CHI; 12*	NHA; 25	PPR; 17	IRP; 1	MCH; 1*	BRI; 3	CAL; 9	RCH; 5	DOV; 9	KAN; 29	CLT; 5	MEM; 14	ATL; 2	**PHO**; 2*	DAR; 33	HOM; 3		2nd	4943	
2005	Hendrick Motorsports	5	Chevy	DAY; 32	CAL	MXC	LVS; 11	ATL	NSH	BRI			TAL; 40	DAR		CLT; 1*		NSH	KEN	MLW	DAY; 27	CHI; 36	NHA	PPR	GTW	IRP	GLN	MCH	**BRI**; 38	CAL	RCH; 14	DOV; 37	KAN; 8						44th	1206	
2005	Hendrick Motorsports	57	Chevy								TEX; DNQ	PHO			RCH; 23		DOV; 36																	CLT; 41	MEM	TEX; 5	PHO	HOM	44th	1206	
2006	Hendrick Motorsports	5	Chevy	DAY; 25	CAL; 23	MXC; 7	LVS; 19	**ATL**; 40	BRI; 1	TEX; 4	NSH; 30	PHO; 12	TAL; 3	RCH; 9	DAR; 6	CLT; 23	DOV; 6	NSH; 31	KEN; 13*	MLW; 24	DAY; 16	CHI; 42	**NHA**; 16	MAR; 20	GTW; 8	IRP; 21	GLN; 37	MCH; 14	BRI; 7	CAL; 11	RCH; 12	DOV; 7	KAN; 3	CLT; 12	MEM	TEX; 32	PHO; 10	HOM; 41	7th	3921	
2007	Hendrick Motorsports	5	Chevy	DAY; 37*	CAL; 3	MXC	LVS; 2*	**ATL**; 3*	BRI; 3	NSH	TEX; 7*	**PHO**; 37	TAL; 39	RCH; 5	DAR	CLT; 8	DOV	NSH	KEN	MLW	NHA	DAY; 1*	CHI; 5*	GTW	IRP	CGV	GLN	MCH	BRI; 4	CAL; 2	**RCH**; 1*	DOV	KAN; 1	CLT; 2	MEM	TEX; 2	PHO; 1*	HOM	16th	2943	
2008	Joe Gibbs Racing	18	Toyota	DAY; 2*		LVS; 31				TEX; 1*	**PHO**; 1*		TAL; 16						KEN; 30*	MLW	NHA; 3	DAY; 2	CHI; 1*	GTW	IRP; 1*	CGV			BRI; 7	**CAL**; 1*		**DOV**; 1*		CLT; 1*	MEM	TEX; 1*		HOM; 2*	6th	4461	
2008	Braun Racing	32	Toyota		CAL; 2			BRI; 42						RCH; 3	DAR; 31	CLT; 1*	DOV; 28	NSH; 20													RCH; 10		KAN; 35				PHO; 5		6th	4461	
2008	Joe Gibbs Racing	20	Toyota				ATL; 24*		**NSH**; 16*			MXC; 1																											6th	4461	
2008	D'Hondt Motorsports	92	Toyota																								GLN; 2	MCH											6th	4461	
2009	Joe Gibbs Racing	18	Toyota	DAY; 4	CAL; 1*	LVS; 39	BRI; 6*	**TEX**; 1*	NSH; 2	PHO; 10	TAL; 10*	RCH; 1*	**DAR**; 16*	CLT; 3*	DOV; 17*	**NSH**; 1*	KEN; 2*	MLW; 2*	NHA; 1	DAY; 2	CHI; 2	GTW; 1	IRP; 2	IOW; 2	GLN; 2	MCH; 3	BRI; 28	CGV; 10	ATL; 2	RCH; 3	**DOV**; 4*	KAN; 2*	CAL; 31*	CLT; 1*	MEM; 2	TEX; 1*	PHO; 9	HOM; 1*	1st	5682	
2010	Joe Gibbs Racing	18	Toyota	DAY; 18	CAL; 1	LVS; 16	BRI; 3	NSH; 3	PHO; 1*	TEX; 1*	TAL; 34	**RCH**; 4	DAR; 2	**DOV**; 1*	CLT; 1	NSH	KEN	ROA	NHA; 1*	DAY; 7	CHI; 1*	GTW	IRP; 1*	IOW; 1*	GLN; 5	MCH; 3	BRI; 1*	CGV	ATL; 2*	RCH; 9	DOV; 1*	KAN; 3*	**CAL**; 1	CLT; 6*	GTW	TEX; 2*	PHO; 16	HOM; 1*	3rd	4934	
2011	Joe Gibbs Racing	18	Toyota	DAY; 7	**PHO**; 1**	LVS; 30*	BRI; 1*	CAL; 1	TEX; 34	TAL; 1	NSH; 2	RCH	**DAR**; 1*	DOV; 2	IOW	CLT; 3	CHI	MCH; 3	ROA	DAY; 4	KEN; 3	NHA; 1	NSH	IRP	IOW	GLN; 4*	CGV	**BRI**; 1*	ATL; 2	RCH; 1	CHI	DOV	KAN	CLT; 2	TEX; QL^{†}	PHO	HOM		89th	0^{1}	
2012	Kyle Busch Motorsports	54	Toyota	DAY; 18	PHO; 11	LVS; 33	BRI; 17	CAL; 8	TEX	RCH	TAL; 2*	DAR	IOW	CLT; 3	DOV	MCH	ROA	KEN	DAY; 23	NHA; 28	CHI; 27	IND; 22*	IOW	GLN; 6	CGV; 10	BRI; 3	**ATL**; 7	RCH	CHI; 2	KEN	DOV; 5	CLT; 4	KAN; 6	**TEX**; 3	PHO; 4	**HOM**; 2*			100th	0^{1}	
2013	Joe Gibbs Racing	54	Toyota	DAY; 32	**PHO**; 1*	LVS; 2	BRI; 1*	**CAL**; 1*	TEX; 1*	RCH; 3	TAL	**DAR**; 1*	CLT; 1*	DOV; 5*	IOW	MCH; 4	ROA	KEN; 5*	DAY; 11	NHA; 1*	CHI	**IND**; 1*	IOW	GLN; 24	MOH	**BRI**; 1*	**ATL**; 2	RCH; 4	**CHI**; 1*	KEN	DOV; 8	KAN; 4	CLT; 1	TEX; 26	PHO; 1*	HOM; 3			89th	0^{1}	
2014	Joe Gibbs Racing	54	Toyota	DAY; 4*	PHO; 1*	LVS; 2	BRI; 1	CAL; 3	TEX; 2	DAR; 4*	RCH; 3	TAL	IOW	**CLT**; 3	DOV; 1*	**MCH**; 4	ROA	KEN; 3	DAY; 17	NHA; 2	CHI	**IND**; 2	IOW	GLN; 2	MOH	**BRI**; 2*	ATL; 4	**RCH**; 1**	CHI; 3*	KEN	DOV; 1*	KAN; 1	CLT; 2	TEX; 1*	**PHO**; 2*	HOM; 2			77th	0^{1}	
2015	Joe Gibbs Racing	54	Toyota	DAY; 26	ATL	LVS	PHO	CAL	TEX	BRI	RCH	TAL	IOW	CLT	DOV	MCH; 1	CHI	DAY	KEN; 3*	NHA; 4	**IND**; 1*	IOW	GLN	MOH	BRI; 1	ROA	DAR; 2	**RCH**; 2	**CHI**; 1*	KEN	DOV; 3*	CLT; 31*	KAN; 1	TEX; 14	**PHO**; 1*	HOM; 30			80th	0^{1}	
2016	Joe Gibbs Racing	18	Toyota	DAY	**ATL**; 1*	**LVS**; 1*	PHO; 1*	CAL; 2*	**TEX**; 1*	BRI; 2	RCH	TAL	DOV	CLT	POC; 4	MCH; 2*	IOW	DAY	**KEN**; 1*	**NHA**; 1*	**IND**; 1*	IOW	GLN; 37	MOH	BRI; 24	ROA	DAR	RCH; 1*	CHI; 13*	KEN	DOV; QL^{‡}	CLT	**KAN**; 1*	TEX	**PHO**; 1*	HOM			85th	0^{1}	
2017	Joe Gibbs Racing	18	Toyota	DAY	**ATL**; 1	**LVS**; 7	PHO	CAL; 3	TEX	BRI	RCH	TAL	CLT	DOV	POC	**MCH**; 5	IOW	DAY	**KEN**; 1	**NHA**; 1	IND; 12*	IOW	GLN; 1*	MOH	**BRI**; 1*	ROA	DAR	**RCH**; 2*	CHI	KEN	DOV	CLT	KAN	TEX	PHO	HOM			85th	0^{1}	
2018	Joe Gibbs Racing	18	Toyota	DAY	ATL	LVS; 14	PHO; 3	CAL	TEX	BRI	RCH	TAL	DOV	CLT; 8*	POC; 1*	MCH; 6	IOW	CHI	DAY	KEN; 3*	NHA	IOW	GLN	MOH	**BRI**; 36	ROA	DAR	IND	LVS	RCH	ROV	DOV	KAN	TEX	PHO	HOM			92nd	0^{1}	
2019	Joe Gibbs Racing	18	Toyota	DAY	ATL	LVS; 1*	PHO; 1*	CAL; 2*	TEX; 1	BRI	RCH	TAL	DOV	CLT	POC	MCH	IOW	CHI	DAY	KEN	NHA	IOW	**GLN**; 31	MOH	BRI; 29*	ROA	DAR	**IND**; 1*	LVS	RCH	ROV	DOV	KAN	TEX	PHO	HOM			79th	0^{1}	
2020	Joe Gibbs Racing	54	Toyota	DAY	LVS	CAL	**PHO**; 3*	DAR; 2	CLT; 1*	BRI	ATL	HOM	HOM	TAL	POC	IRC	KEN	KEN	TEX; 37	KAN	ROA	DRC	DOV	DOV	DAY	DAR	RCH; 3	RCH	BRI	LVS	TAL	ROV	KAN	TEX	MAR	PHO			73rd	0^{1}	
2021	Joe Gibbs Racing	54	Toyota	DAY	DRC	HOM	LVS	PHO	ATL	MAR	TAL	DAR	DOV	**COA**; 1*	CLT	MOH	TEX; 1*	**NSH**; 1*	POC	ROA; 1	ATL; 1*	NHA	GLN	IRC	MCH	DAY	DAR	RCH	BRI	LVS	TAL	ROV	TEX	KAN	MAR	PHO			73rd	0^{1}	
2023	Kaulig Racing	10	Chevy	DAY	CAL	LVS; 4	PHO; 9	ATL	COA	RCH	MAR	TAL	DOV	DAR	CLT; QL^{±}	PIR	SON	NSH	CSC	ATL	NHA	POC	ROA	MCH	IRC	GLN; 27	DAY	DAR; 9	KAN	BRI	TEX	ROV	LVS	HOM	MAR	PHO			81st	0^{1}	
2024	Richard Childress Racing	33	Chevy	DAY	ATL	LVS	PHO	COA	RCH	MAR	TEX	TAL	DOV	DAR	CLT; 6	PIR	SON	IOW	NHA	NSH	CSC	POC	IND	MCH	DAY	DAR	ATL	GLN	BRI	KAN	TAL	ROV	LVS	HOM	MAR	PHO			88th	0^{1}	
^{†} – Qualified but replaced by Denny Hamlin · ^{‡} – Qualified but replaced by Drew Herring · ^{±} – Qualified but replaced by Justin Haley

==== Craftsman Truck Series ====
NASCAR Craftsman Truck Series results
Year	Team	No.	Make	1	2	3	4	5	6	7	8	9	10	11	12	13	14	15	16	17	18	19	20	21	22	23	24	25	NCTC	Pts	Ref
2001	Roush Racing	99	Ford	DAY	HOM	MMR	MAR	GTW	DAR	PPR	DOV	TEX	MEM	MLW	KAN	KEN	NHA	IRP; 9	NSH	CIC; 17	NZH	RCH; 22	SBO; 33	TEX; 25	LVS; 9	PHO	CAL; QL^{†}		42nd	642	
2004	Morgan-Dollar Motorsports	47	Chevy	DAY	ATL	MAR	MFD	CLT	DOV	TEX	MEM	MLW	KAN	KEN	GTW	MCH	IRP; 11	NSH	BRI	RCH	NHA	LVS	CAL	TEX	MAR	PHO	DAR	HOM	82nd	130	
2005	Billy Ballew Motorsports	15	Chevy	DAY	CAL	ATL	MAR	GTW	MFD	CLT; 1*	DOV; 1	TEX	**MCH**; 2	MLW	KAN	KEN	MEM	IRP	NSH	BRI; 5	RCH; 30	NHA; 9	LVS	MAR; 5	ATL; 1	TEX; 3	PHO; 11	HOM; 6	27th	1734	
2006	Billy Ballew Motorsports	51	Chevy	DAY	CAL	ATL	MAR	GTW	CLT; 1*	MFD	DOV; 10	TEX	MCH	MLW	KAN	KEN	MEM	IRP	NSH										32nd	1107	
2006	Billy Ballew Motorsports	15	Chevy																	BRI; 6	NHA; 3	LVS	TAL	MAR; 6	ATL	TEX; 2	PHO; 9	HOM	32nd	1107	
2007	Billy Ballew Motorsports	51	Chevy	DAY	CAL	ATL	MAR	KAN	CLT; 11	MFD	DOV; 12	TEX	MCH; 2*	MLW	MEM	KEN	IRP	NSH	BRI; 15	GTW	NHA; 33	LVS	TAL; 14	MAR; 31	ATL; 1*	TEX; 29	PHO; 1	HOM; 2*	26th	1466	
2008	Billy Ballew Motorsports	51	Toyota	DAY; 2	CAL; 1*	ATL; 1	MAR; 26	KAN	**CLT**; 8*	MFD	DOV; 27*	TEX; 2	MCH; 7	MLW	MEM	KEN; 6	IRP; 8	NSH	BRI; 1*	GTW	NHA; 6	LVS	TAL; 3	MAR; 4	ATL; 8	TEX; 2*	PHO; 2*	HOM; 4*	14th	2854	
2009	Billy Ballew Motorsports	51	Toyota	DAY; 2	**CAL**; 1*	**ATL**; 1	MAR; 17*	KAN	CLT; 2	DOV; 9*	TEX	MCH; 2*	MLW	MEM	KEN	IRP; 10	NSH	BRI; 1	CHI; 1*	IOW	GTW	NHA; 1	LVS	MAR	TAL; 1	TEX; 1*	PHO; 2	HOM; 13	17th	2583	
2010	Kyle Busch Motorsports	18	Toyota	DAY; 22	ATL; 2	MAR	**NSH**; 1*	KAN	**DOV**; 16*	**CLT**; 1*	TEX	MCH; 3	IOW	GTW	IRP; 2	POC	NSH	DAR	**BRI**; 1*	CHI; 1*	KEN; 7*	**NHA**; 1*	LVS	**MAR**; 2	TAL; 1	TEX; 1*	PHO; 2	HOM; 1*	14th	2798	
2011	Kyle Busch Motorsports	18	Toyota	DAY; 5	PHO; 1*	DAR	MAR; 2	**NSH**; 1*	DOV; 1*	CLT; 1	KAN; 6	TEX	KEN; 1*	IOW	NSH	IRP	POC; 2	MCH; 25	BRI; 30	ATL; 3	CHI; 5	**NHA**; 1*	KEN	LVS	TAL; 9	MAR	TEX; 33	HOM	81st	0^{1}	
2012	Kyle Busch Motorsports	18	Toyota	DAY	MAR	ROC	KAN	CLT	DOV	TEX	KEN	IOW	CHI	POC	MCH	BRI	ATL; 2*	IOW	KEN	LVS	TAL	MAR	TEX; 4	PHO	HOM; 2				82nd	0^{1}	
2013	Kyle Busch Motorsports	51	Toyota	DAY; 2	MAR	ROC	KAN; 27	CLT; 1*	DOV; 1	TEX	KEN; 3	IOW	ELD	POC	MCH; 2	BRI; 1	MSP	IOW	CHI; 1*	LVS	TAL; 10	MAR	TEX; 28	PHO	HOM; 1				84th	0^{1}	
2014	Kyle Busch Motorsports	51	Toyota	DAY; 1	MAR	**KAN**; 1*	**CLT**; 1*	**DOV**; 1*	TEX	GTW	**KEN**; 1*	IOW	ELD	POC	MCH; 5	**BRI**; 24	MSP	CHI; 1*	NHA	LVS	TAL	MAR	TEX; 1*	PHO	HOM; 4				88th	0^{1}	
2015	Kyle Busch Motorsports	51	Toyota	DAY	ATL	MAR	KAN	CLT	DOV	TEX	GTW	IOW	KEN	ELD	POC; 1*	MCH; 1*				NHA; 11	LVS	TAL	MAR	TEX	PHO	HOM			80th	0^{1}	
2015	Kyle Busch Motorsports	54	Toyota														**BRI**; 2	MSP	CHI										80th	0^{1}	
2016	Kyle Busch Motorsports	18	Toyota	DAY	ATL	MAR; 1*	KAN	DOV	CLT; 2	TEX	IOW	GTW	KEN; 30	ELD	POC	BRI	MCH	MSP	CHI; 1*	NHA	LVS	TAL	MAR	TEX	PHO	HOM			80th	0^{1}	
2017	Kyle Busch Motorsports	51	Toyota	DAY	ATL; 26	MAR	KAN; 1*	CLT; 1*	DOV	TEX	GTW	IOW			POC; 25*	MCH; 3*													75th	0^{1}	
2017	Kyle Busch Motorsports	46	Toyota										KEN; 6	ELD			**BRI**; 1*	MSP	CHI	NHA	LVS	TAL	MAR	TEX	PHO	HOM			75th	0^{1}	
2018	Kyle Busch Motorsports	4	Toyota	DAY	**ATL**; 21*				KAN; 2																				89th	0^{1}	
2018	Kyle Busch Motorsports	51	Toyota			**LVS**; 1*	MAR	DOV		CLT; 2	TEX	IOW	GTW	CHI	KEN	ELD	**POC**; 1*	MCH	BRI	MSP	LVS	TAL	MAR	TEX	PHO	HOM			89th	0^{1}	
2019	Kyle Busch Motorsports	51	Toyota	DAY	ATL; 1*	**LVS**; 1*	MAR; 1*	TEX; 1*	DOV	KAN	CLT; 1*	TEX	IOW	GTW	CHI	KEN	POC	ELD	MCH	BRI	MSP	LVS	TAL	MAR	PHO	HOM			96th	0^{1}	
2020	Kyle Busch Motorsports	51	Toyota	DAY	LVS; 1*	CLT; 2	ATL; 21*	HOM; 1*	POC	KEN	TEX; 1*	KAN	KAN	MCH	DRC	DOV	GTW	DAR	RCH	BRI	LVS	TAL	KAN	TEX	MAR	PHO			78th	0^{1}	
2021	Kyle Busch Motorsports	51	Toyota	DAY	DRC	LVS; 2	ATL; 1*	BRD	RCH; 2	KAN; 1*	DAR	COA	CLT	TEX	NSH	POC; 2*	KNX	GLN	GTW	DAR	BRI	LVS	TAL	MAR	PHO				93rd	0^{1}	
2022	Kyle Busch Motorsports	51	Toyota	DAY	LVS; 2	ATL	COA; 3*	MAR; 3	BRD	DAR	KAN	TEX	CLT; 7	GTW	SON; 1*	KNX	NSH	MOH	POC	IRP	RCH	KAN	BRI	TAL	HOM	PHO			86th	0^{1}	
2023	Kyle Busch Motorsports	51	Chevy	DAY	**LVS**; 1*	ATL	COA; 2	TEX	BRD	MAR; 2	KAN; 7	DAR	NWS	CLT	GTW	NSH	MOH	POC; 1	RCH	IRP	MLW	KAN	BRI	TAL	HOM	PHO			84th	0^{1}	
2024	Spire Motorsports	7	Chevy	DAY	ATL; 1	LVS; 15	BRI; 2	COA	MAR	TEX; 1*	KAN	DAR; 32	NWS	CLT	GTW	NSH	POC	IRP	RCH	MLW	BRI	KAN	TAL	HOM	MAR	PHO			79th	0^{1}	
2025	Spire Motorsports	7	Chevy	DAY	ATL; 1*	LVS	HOM	MAR	BRI	ROC	TEX	KAN		CLT; 5															76th	0^{1}	
2025	Spire Motorsports	07	Chevy										NWS; 9		NSH; 15	MCH	POC	LRP	IRP	GLN; 36	RCH	DAR	BRI	NHA	ROV	TAL	MAR	PHO	76th	0^{1}	
2026	Spire Motorsports	7	Chevy	DAY	ATL; 1	STP	DAR	ROC	BRI; 8	TEX; 2	GLN	**DOV**; 1*	CLT; Wth	NSH	MCH	COR	LRP	NWS	IRP	RCH	NHA	BRI	KAN	CLT	PHO	TAL	MAR	HOM	94th	0^{1}	
^{†} – Busch was declared ineligible to compete at Fontana due to his age and sponsorship reasons and was replaced by Tim Woods III.

^{1} Ineligible for series points

=== ARCA Re/Max Series ===
(key) (Bold – Pole position awarded by qualifying time. Italics – Pole position earned by points standings or practice time. * – Most laps led.)

ARCA Re/Max Series results
Year	Team	No.	Make	1	2	3	4	5	6	7	8	9	10	11	12	13	14	15	16	17	18	19	20	21	22	ARMC	Pts	Ref
2002	WP Motorsports	22	Chevy	DAY	ATL	NSH	SLM	KEN	CLT	KAN	POC	MCH	TOL	SBO	KEN	BLN	POC	NSH	ISF	WIN	DSF	CHI	SLM	TAL	CLT; 12	122nd	170	
2003	Hendrick Motorsports	87	Chevy	DAY	ATL	NSH; 1*	SLM	TOL	KEN; 1*	CLT; 11	BLN	KAN	MCH; 36	LER	POC	POC; 25*	NSH	ISF	WIN	DSF	CHI	SLM	TAL; 28	CLT; 17	SBO	22nd	1170	
2004	Hendrick Motorsports	87	Chevy	DAY; 1*	NSH	SLM	KEN	TOL	CLT	KAN	POC	MCH	SBO	BLN	KEN	GTW	POC	LER	NSH	ISF	TOL	DSF	CHI	SLM	TAL	97th	225	

==== Camping World East Series ====
NASCAR Camping World East Series results
Year	Team	No.	Make	1	2	3	4	5	6	7	8	9	10	11	NCWEC	Pts	Ref
2009	Joe Gibbs Racing	18	Toyota	GRE	TRI	**IOW**; 1*	SBO	GLN	NHA	TMP	ADI	LRP	NHA	DOV	44th	190	

=== Superstar Racing Experience ===
(key) * – Most laps led. ^{1} – Heat 1 winner. ^{2} – Heat 2 winner.

Superstar Racing Experience results
Year	No.	1	2	3	4	5	6	SRXC	Pts	References
2023	51	STA	STA II	MMS; 1*	BER; 1*	ELD	LOS	N/A	0 (ineligible for points)	

=== Complete WeatherTech SportsCar Championship results ===
(key) (Races in bold indicate pole position; races in italics indicate fastest lap)

Year	Entrant	Class	Make	Engine	1	2	3	4	5	6	7	8	9	10	11	Rank	Points	References
2020	AIM Vasser Sullivan	GTD	Lexus RC F GT3	Lexus 5.0 L V8	DAY; 9	DAY	SEB	ELK	VIR	ATL	MDO	CLT	PET	LGA	SEB	50th	22	

==== 24 Hours of Daytona ====
24 Hours of Daytona results
Year	Class	No	Team	Car	Co-drivers	Laps	Position	Class Pos.	Ref
2020	GTD	14	(Canada) AIM Vasser Sullivan	Lexus RC F GT3	(United States) Parker Chase (United States) Michael de Quesada (United Kingdom) Jack Hawksworth	757	26th	9th	

== Awards and honors ==
NASCAR

- Two-time NASCAR Cup Series Champion (2015, 2019)
- Two-time NASCAR Cup Series Regular Season Champion (2018, 2019)
- NASCAR Nationwide Series Champion (2009)
- Seven-time NASCAR Craftsman Truck Series Owner's Champion (as owner of Kyle Busch Motorsports – 2010, 2013, 2014, 2015, 2016, 2017, 2019)

WWE

- WWE 24/7 Championship (one time)

Media

- Two-time Best Driver ESPY Award winner (2016, 2019)

== See also ==
- List of all-time NASCAR Cup Series winners
- List of NASCAR Nationwide Series champions
- List of NASCAR race wins by Kyle Busch
- List of NASCAR Cup Series champions
- List of people from Las Vegas

Sporting positions
Preceded by Kevin Harvick	NASCAR Sprint Cup Series Champion; 2015	Succeeded by Jimmie Johnson
Preceded by Joey Logano	Monster Energy NASCAR Cup Series Champion; 2019	Succeeded by Chase Elliott
Preceded by Clint Bowyer	NASCAR Nationwide Series Champion; 2009	Succeeded by Brad Keselowski
Achievements
Preceded by Jeff Gordon	Bojangles' Southern 500 Winner; 2008	Succeeded by Mark Martin
Preceded by Kurt Busch	Budweiser Shootout Winner; 2012	Succeeded by Kevin Harvick
Preceded by Erik Jones	Busch Clash Winner; 2021	Succeeded by Joey Logano
Preceded by Jeff Gordon	Brickyard 400 Winner; 2015, 2016	Succeeded by Kasey Kahne
Preceded by Austin Dillon	Coca-Cola 600 winner 2018	Succeeded by Martin Truex Jr.
Preceded by Joey Logano	NASCAR All-Star Race winner 2017	Succeeded by Kevin Harvick
Preceded by Augie Grill	Snowball Derby Winner; 2009	Succeeded by Johanna Long
Preceded by Christian Eckes	Snowball Derby Winner; 2017	Succeeded by Noah Gragson
Preceded by Eddie MacDonald	TD Bank 250 Winner; 2011	Succeeded by Joey Polewarczyk Jr.
Preceded by Clint Bowyer	Prelude to the Dream Winner; 2012	Succeeded by Final
Preceded by Travis Sauter	Howie Lettow Memorial 150 Winner; 2013	Succeeded by Incumbent
Awards
Preceded by Kasey Kahne	NASCAR Nextel Cup Series Rookie of the Year; 2005	Succeeded by Denny Hamlin
Preceded by David Stremme	NASCAR Busch Series Rookie of the Year; 2004	Succeeded by Carl Edwards
Preceded by Kevin Harvick	Best Driver ESPY Award; 2016	Succeeded by Lewis Hamilton
