= Kyle Tilley =

British racing driver (born 1988)

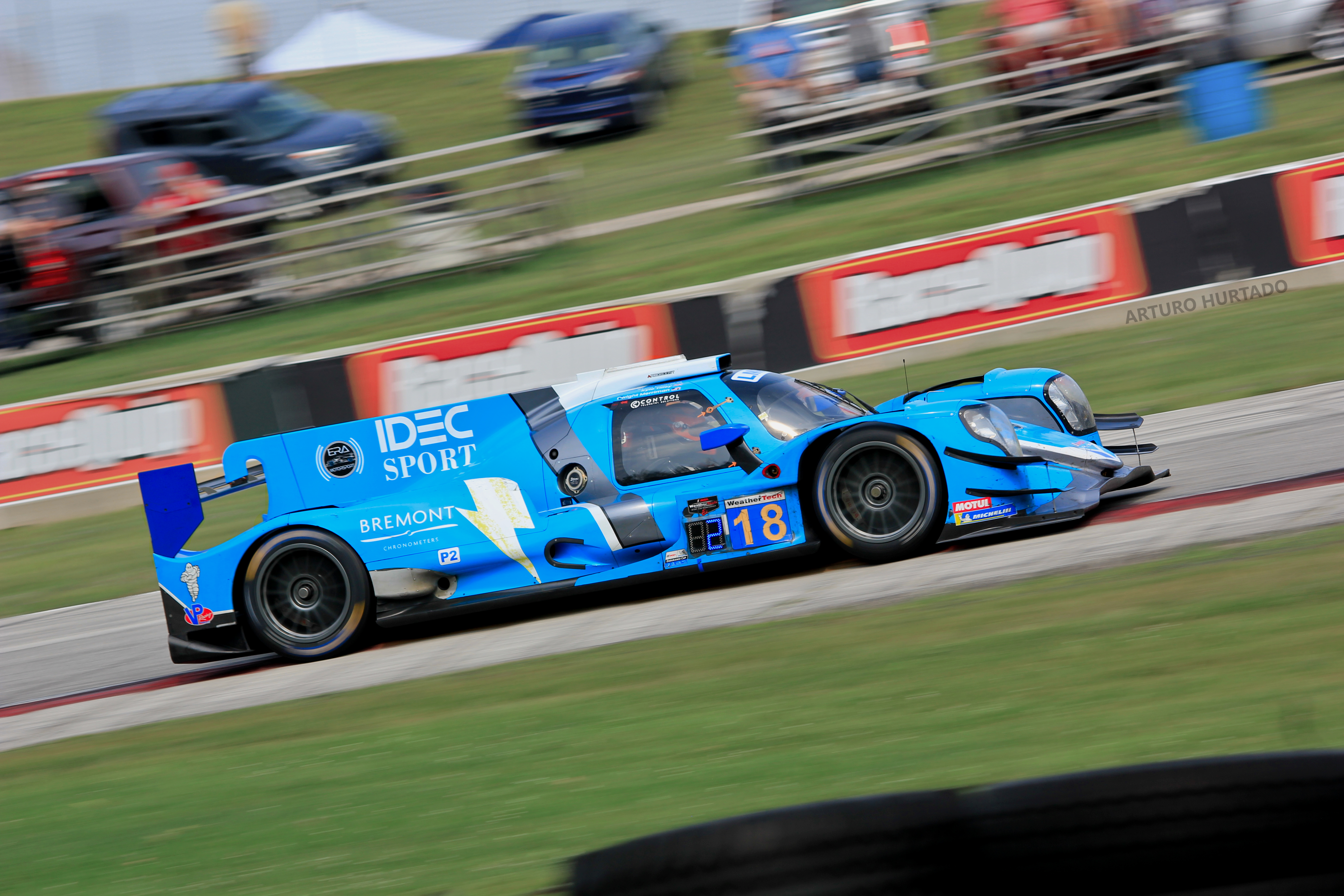
- Nationality: (United Kingdom) British
- Born: Kyle Richard George Tilley; 16 February 1988 (age 38) Bath, Somerset, England

IMSA SportsCar Championship career
- Debut season: 2020
- Current team: Era Motorsport
- Categorisation: FIA Silver
- Car number: 18
- Starts: 6
- Wins: 1
- Podiums: 5
- Best finish: 5th in 2020
- Finished last season: 5th (2020)

NASCAR Cup Series career
- 4 races run over 2 years
- 2022 position: 39th
- Best finish: 39th (2022)
- First race: 2021 Texas Grand Prix (Austin)
- Last race: 2022 Kwik Trip 250 (Road America)
| Wins | Top tens | Poles |
|---|---|---|
| 0 | 0 | 0 |

NASCAR O'Reilly Auto Parts Series career
- 1 race run over 1 year
- 2021 position: 106th
- Best finish: 106th (2021)
- First race: 2021 Skrewball Peanut Butter Whiskey 200 at The Glen (Watkins Glen)
| Wins | Top tens | Poles |
|---|---|---|
| 0 | 0 | 0 |

24 Hours of Le Mans career
- Years: 2020
- Teams: IDEC Sport
- Best finish: 15th (2020)

Previous series
- 2021 2021 2019 2017 2016: Asian Le Mans Series; European Le Mans Series; Historic Formula One Championship; Pirelli World Challenge; Continental Tire SportsCar Challenge

Championship titles
- 2021: Asian Le Mans Series - LMP2
- Statistics up to date as of 28 December 2021.

Kyle Richard George Tilley (born 16 February 1988) is a British professional racing driver. He mainly competes in historic motorsport and sports car racing such as the Historic Formula One Championship and IMSA SportsCar Championship and also the Nürburgring Langstrecken-Serie. In IMSA, he drives in the LMP2 class for his team Era Motorsport and in NLS he competes for Lionspeed GP. He won the Asian Le Mans Series LMP2 championship in 2021.

Other sports car series in which Tilley has raced include the Continental Tire SportsCar Challenge, Pirelli World Challenge, European Le Mans Series, and NASCAR Cup Series.

== Racing career ==
Tilley originally participated in cycling before a knee injury forced him to quit the sport, and he began kart racing at the age of eight. He later raced in Formula Ford, a series with high financial demands that forced him to work three jobs—a delivery driver for a catering business, a mechanic for a Historic Formula One Championship team, and a sales assistant—to pay for crew members and the car. In 2010, he won the Castle Combe Formula Ford 1600 Pre 90 championship.

Tilley moved to sports cars in 2011 and spent the next two years driving for Topcats Racing in Britcar. Plans to return to full-time open-wheel racing in 2013, competing in the British Formula 3 International Series for his own team, were aborted; in May, he made a guest appearance in Formula Ford 1600 at Castle Combe Circuit where he finished tenth.

Tilley continued sports car racing upon moving to the United States. In 2015, he and co-driver Jerry Kaufman won a 13-hour endurance race at Virginia International Raceway sanctioned by the Sports Car Club of America. The following year, the two joined Continental Tire SportsCar Challenge team BimmerWorld to race in the ST class. Tilley and Kaufman continued to drive together in the 2017 Pirelli World Challenge SprintX GTS class for The Racer's Group, where they finished second in the championship.

In 2019, Tilley started racing in Historic Formula One. Driving a 1977 Ensign N177, he won at Circuit Zandvoort and Circuit de Spa-Francorchamps, both races in wet conditions, and finished third in the Fittipaldi Class standings. Tilley's vintage racing also saw him create his team Era Motorsport, which began racing in the IMSA SportsCar Championship LMP2 class in 2020. The project was spurred after Tilley befriended tech company businessman Dwight Merriman, with whom he started worked as a touring car racing driver coach in 2018.

Era Motorsport's debut came at the 2020 24 Hours of Daytona, in which the team ran an Oreca 07 for Tilley, Merriman, Ryan Lewis, and Nicolas Minassian. The team initially formed a partnership with DragonSpeed before opting to run the full LMP2 season as a standalone operation. The car finished third in the LMP2 class, followed by Tilley and Merriman scoring three more podium finishes that year. The duo also entered the 24 Hours of Le Mans for IDEC Sport alongside Jonathan Kennard; despite Merriman crashing in practice and being replaced by Patrick Pilet for the race, the car finished fifteenth. Although Era was second in the LMP2 standings with three races remaining, the COVID-19 pandemic and Merriman's injuries prompted the team to withdraw from the championship.

In 2021, Era allied with Jota Sport to field an LMP2 for Tilley and Merriman in the Asian Le Mans Series. Tilley, Merriman, and Andreas Laskaratos claimed the LMP2 Am division championship after winning all four races. Era also won the 24 Hours of Daytona LMP2 class with Tilley, Merriman, Ryan Dalziel, and Paul-Loup Chatin. In April, Tilley and his team started competing in the European Le Mans Series.

Tilley began dabbling in stock car racing in May 2021 when he joined Live Fast Motorsports for the NASCAR Cup Series' Texas Grand Prix at Circuit of the Americas. His schedule in the team's No. 78 also included races at Road America, Watkins Glen International, and Indianapolis Motor Speedway.

== Personal life ==
A native of Bath, Somerset, Tilley lives in Carmel, Indiana. He is an alumnus of Sheldon School in Chippenham.

== Motorsports career results ==
=== Sports car racing ===
==== IMSA WeatherTech SportsCar Championship ====
(key) (Races in bold indicate pole position. Races in italics indicate fastest race lap in class. Results are overall/class)

| Year | Team | Class | Make | Engine | 1 | 2 | 3 | 4 | 5 | 6 | 7 | Rank | Points | Ref |
|---|---|---|---|---|---|---|---|---|---|---|---|---|---|---|
| 2020 | Era Motorsport | LMP2 | Oreca 07 | Gibson Technology GK428 V8 | DAY; 3 | SEB; 3 | ELK; 3 | ATL; 2 | ATL | SEB | | 5th | 92 | |
| 2021 | Era Motorsport | LMP2 | Oreca 07 | Gibson Technology GK428 V8 | DAY; 1 | SEB; 2 | WGI; 5 | WGI | ELK | LGA | ATL; 5 | 7th | 930 | |
| 2022 | Era Motorsport | LMP2 | Oreca 07 | Gibson GK428 V8 | DAY; 7 | SEB; 3 | LGA | MDO | WGL | ELK | PET | 3rd* | 328* | |

==== 24 Hours of Daytona ====
24 Hours of Daytona results
| Year | Class | No | Team | Car | Co-drivers | Laps | Position | Class Pos. | Ref |
|---|---|---|---|---|---|---|---|---|---|
| 2020 | LMP2 | 18 | (United States) Era Motorsport | Oreca 07 | (United States) Dwight Merriman (United States) Ryan Lewis (France) Nicolas Minassian | 800 | 11 | 3 | |
| 2021 | LMP2 | 18 | (United States) Era Motorsport | Oreca 07 | (United States) Dwight Merriman (Scotland) Ryan Dalziel (France) Paul-Loup Chatin | 787 | 6 | **1** | |

==== 24 Hours of Le Mans ====
| Year | Team | Co-Drivers | Car | Class | Laps | Pos. | Class Pos. | Ref |
|---|---|---|---|---|---|---|---|---|
| 2020 | (France) IDEC Sport | (United Kingdom) Jonathan Kennard (France) Patrick Pilet | Oreca 07 | LMP2 | 363 | 15 | 11 | |

==== Asian Le Mans Series ====
(key) (Races in bold indicate pole position) (Races in italics indicate fastest lap)

| Year | Entrant | Class | Make | Engine | 1 | 2 | 3 | 4 | Pos | Points |
|---|---|---|---|---|---|---|---|---|---|---|
| 2021 | Jota Sport | LMP2 Am | Oreca 07 | Gibson GK428 4.2 L V8 | **DUB**; 1 | **DUB**; 1 | **ABH**; 1 | **ABH**; 1 | 1st | 104 |

=== NASCAR ===
(key) (Bold – Pole position awarded by qualifying time. Italics – Pole position earned by points standings or practice time. * – Most laps led.)

==== Cup Series ====
NASCAR Cup Series results
| Year | Team | No. | Make | 1 | 2 | 3 | 4 | 5 | 6 | 7 | 8 | 9 | 10 | 11 | 12 | 13 | 14 | 15 | 16 | 17 | 18 | 19 | 20 | 21 | 22 | 23 | 24 | 25 | 26 | 27 | 28 | 29 | 30 | 31 | 32 | 33 | 34 | 35 | 36 | NCSC | Pts | Ref |
|---|---|---|---|---|---|---|---|---|---|---|---|---|---|---|---|---|---|---|---|---|---|---|---|---|---|---|---|---|---|---|---|---|---|---|---|---|---|---|---|---|---|---|
| 2021 | Live Fast Motorsports | 78 | Ford | DAY | DRC | HOM | LVS | PHO | ATL | BRD | MAR | RCH | TAL | KAN | DAR | DOV | COA; 31 | CLT | SON | NSH | POC | POC | ROA; 35 | ATL | NHA | GLN; 30 | IRC; QL^{†} | MCH | DAY | DAR | RCH | BRI | LVS | TAL | ROV | TEX | KAN | MAR | PHO | 62nd | 0^{1} | |
| 2022 | Live Fast Motorsports | 78 | Ford | DAY | CAL | LVS | PHO | ATL | COA | RCH | MAR | BRD | TAL | DOV | DAR | KAN | CLT | GTW | SON | NSH | ROA; 30 | ATL | NHA | POC | IRC | MCH | RCH | GLN; 39 | DAY | DAR | KAN | BRI | TEX | TAL | ROV | LVS | HOM | MAR | PHO | 39th | 8 | |
^{†} – Qualified but replaced by Andy Lally ·

==== Xfinity Series ====
NASCAR Xfinity Series results
| Year | Team | No. | Make | 1 | 2 | 3 | 4 | 5 | 6 | 7 | 8 | 9 | 10 | 11 | 12 | 13 | 14 | 15 | 16 | 17 | 18 | 19 | 20 | 21 | 22 | 23 | 24 | 25 | 26 | 27 | 28 | 29 | 30 | 31 | 32 | 33 | NXSC | Pts | Ref |
|---|---|---|---|---|---|---|---|---|---|---|---|---|---|---|---|---|---|---|---|---|---|---|---|---|---|---|---|---|---|---|---|---|---|---|---|---|---|---|---|
| 2021 | B. J. McLeod Motorsports | 99 | Chevy | DAY | DRC | HOM | LVS | PHO | ATL | MAR | TAL | DAR | DOV | COA | CLT | MOH | TEX | NSH | POC | ROA | ATL | NHA | GLN; 40 | | | | | | | | | | | | | | 106th | 0^{1} | |
| 2021 | B. J. McLeod Motorsports | 5 | Toyota | | | | | | | | | | | | | | | | | | | | | IRC; QL^{†} | MCH | DAY | DAR | RCH | BRI | LVS | TAL | ROV | TEX | KAN | MAR | PHO | 106th | 0^{1} | |
^{†} – Qualified but replaced by James Davison ·

^{*} Season still in progress
^{1} Ineligible for series points
