= Austin Cindric =

American racing driver (born 1998)

- Cindric at Las Vegas Motor Speedway in 2026
- Born: Austin Louis Cindric; September 2, 1998 (age 28); Columbus, Ohio, U.S.
- Height: 6 ft 3 in (1.91 m)
- Weight: 170 lb (77 kg)
- Achievements: 2022 Daytona 500 Winner; 2020 NASCAR Xfinity Series Champion; 2020 NASCAR Xfinity Series Regular Season Champion; 2025 The Duel at Daytona Winner; 2026 Ford Proud to Honor Veterans Day Classic Winner
- Awards: 2022 NASCAR Cup Series Rookie of the Year

NASCAR Cup Series career
- 187 races run over 6 years
- Car no., team: No. 2 (Team Penske)
- 2026 position: 10th
- Best finish: 10th (2026)
- First race: 2021 Daytona 500 (Daytona)
- Last race: 2026 Season Finale 400 (Homestead)
- First win: 2022 Daytona 500 (Daytona)
- Last win: 2025 Jack Link's 500 (Talladega)
Wins	Top tens	Poles
3	37	1

NASCAR O'Reilly Auto Parts Series career
- 133 races run over 5 years
- 2021 position: 2nd
- Best finish: 1st (2020)
- First race: 2017 Johnsonville 180 (Road America)
- Last race: 2021 NASCAR Xfinity Series Championship Race (Phoenix)
- First win: 2019 Zippo 200 at The Glen (Watkins Glen)
- Last win: 2021 Pennzoil 150 (Indianapolis G.P.)
Wins	Top tens	Poles
13	89	8

NASCAR FedEx Freight Truck Series career
- 29 races run over 3 years
- 2017 position: 3rd
- Best finish: 3rd (2017)
- First race: 2015 Kroger 200 (Martinsville)
- Last race: 2017 Ford EcoBoost 200 (Homestead)
- First win: 2017 Chevrolet Silverado 250 (Mosport)
Wins	Top tens	Poles
1	16	1

ARCA Menards Series career
- 8 races run over 3 years
- Best finish: 30th (2016)
- First race: 2015 #ThisIsMySpeedway 150 (Iowa)
- Last race: 2017 Road America 100 (Road America)
- First win: 2016 Crosley 150 (Kentucky)
Wins	Top tens	Poles
1	5	1

ARCA Menards Series East career
- 2 races run over 1 year
- Best finish: 33rd (2016)
- First race: 2016 Biscuitville 125 (Danville)
- Last race: 2016 Bully Hill Vineyards 100 (Watkins Glen)
- First win: 2016 Biscuitville 125 (Danville)
- Last win: 2016 Bully Hill Vineyards 100 (Watkins Glen)
Wins	Top tens	Poles
2	2	2
Medal record
Representing United States
Summer X Games
Bronze medal – third place	2014 Austin	GRC Lites
- Statistics up to date as of November 8, 2026.

Austin Louis Cindric (born September 2, 1998) is an American professional auto racing driver. He competes full-time in the NASCAR Cup Series, driving the No. 2 Ford Mustang Dark Horse SC for Team Penske.

Prior to competing in stock cars, Cindric raced in a variety of disciplines, including sports cars, the Road to Indy ladder, and the Global RallyCross Championship. His first NASCAR start came in the NASCAR Camping World Truck Series in 2015, and he finished third in that series' standings in 2017 before moving up to the Xfinity Series. He won the 2020 NASCAR Xfinity Series Championship and the 2022 Daytona 500.

== Racing career ==
=== Early career ===
Cindric started his career in semi-professional legends car and Bandolero racing in North Carolina. After attending the Skip Barber Racing School to gain road racing experience, in 2013 and 2014, he raced in the U.S. F2000 National Championship. In 2013, he finished seventeenth in points, driving for Andretti Autosport with a best finish of seventh in the season finale. In 2014, he switched teams to Pabst Racing Services, finishing fourteenth in points with a second-place podium finish on the oval at Lucas Oil Raceway. He also competed in Historic Sportscar Racing, winning a race in a Porsche 944.

In 2014, Cindric began competing in the Global RallyCross Championship Lites, winning the bronze medal at his debut, the X Games Austin 2014.

=== Sports car racing ===
In October 2014, Cindric made his IMSA Continental Tire Sports Car Challenge debut for Racers Edge Motorsports at Road Atlanta with David Levine as co-driver, finishing seventeenth. During the year, he was named a member of the Porsche North American Junior Academy. In 2015, at the age of seventeen, Cindric competed in the Bathurst 12 Hour, the youngest driver to compete in the event, driving the No. 63 Mercedes-Benz SLS AMG for Erebus Motorsport; he finished 21st overall and seventh in his class. He began competing full-time in the CTSCC in 2015, driving for Multimatic Motorsports with Jade Buford as co-driver. In July, he won the CTSCC race at Canadian Tire Motorsport Park, becoming the youngest winner in the series at the age of seventeen.

In 2016, Cindric drove the No. 6 McLaren for K-PAX Racing in the Pirelli World Challenge.

Cindric was picked to drive the No. 64 Ford Multimatic Motorsports Ford Mustang GT3 at the 2024 IMSA WeatherTech SportsCar Championship Rolex 24 at Daytona. Cindric replaced endurance racer Ben Barker in the driver lineup after Barker broke his collarbone in a skiing accident over the holidays.

=== Stock car racing ===
==== Regional and Camping World Truck Series ====
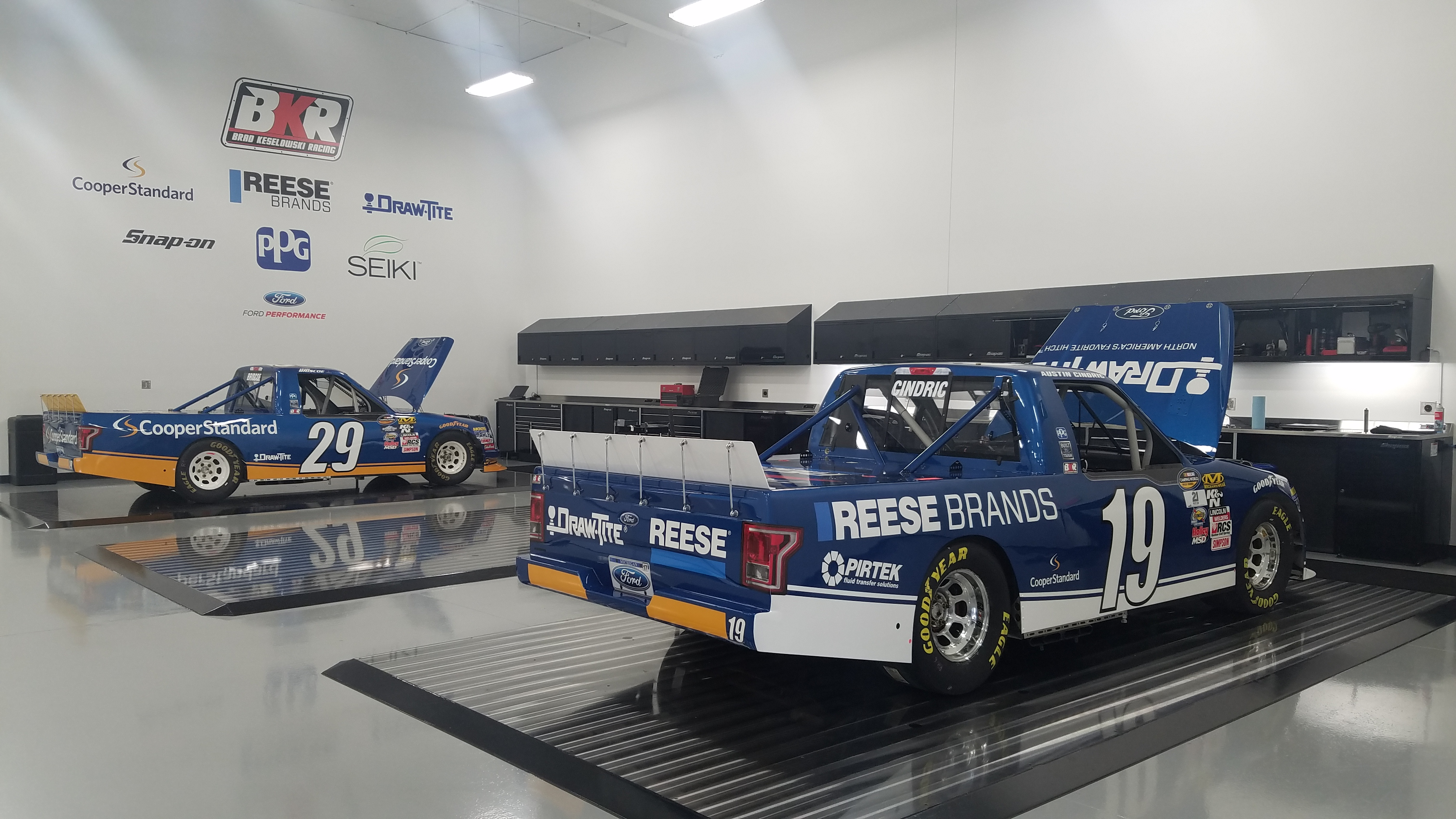
Cindric's No. 19 Draw-Tite Ford F-150 at the Brad Keselowski Racing shop

In July 2015, Cindric made his ARCA Racing Series debut at the #ThisIsMySpeedway 150 at Iowa Speedway, driving the No. 99 for Cunningham Motorsports; Cindric started and finished fourth in the race. He made his NASCAR debut in the Camping World Truck Series, driving the No. 29 Ford F-150 for Brad Keselowski Racing at Martinsville as a substitute for Austin Theriault, who was still recovering from his injury at Las Vegas.

In addition to his Pirelli World Challenge schedule in 2016, he joined Martin-McClure Racing for two K&N Pro Series East events and Brad Keselowski Racing in the No. 2 F-150 at Dover International Speedway. His two K&N East starts resulted in victories at Virginia International Raceway and Watkins Glen International. Later in the year, he recorded his first ARCA win at Kentucky Speedway. That October, Cindric made his restrictor track debut at Talladega, finishing 20th. In November 2016, BKR announced that Cindric would compete full-time in the Truck Series in 2017.

During the 2017 NASCAR Camping World Truck Series season, he grabbed the pole for the season's lone road course race at Canadian Tire Motorsport Park. Although he led the most laps that day, differing strategies saw Cindric behind Kaz Grala on the last lap. Cindric, on newer tires, made contact with Grala, causing the No. 33 to spin. Cindric went on to win and claim a playoff berth in team Brad Keselowski Racing's final season. Grala claimed that he got run over, but Cindric marginalized his maneuver by calling it a "last resort" and claiming that it was justified by the need for a playoff spot. The move drew widespread criticism from other drivers, including Justin Allgaier and Christopher Bell. A week after the Mosport incident, Cindric made a Global Rallycross start in which he collided with Scott Speed coming out of a joker lap. That led to a verbal confrontation with Speed afterwards and again drew the ire of the NASCAR community on social media.

==== Xfinity Series ====
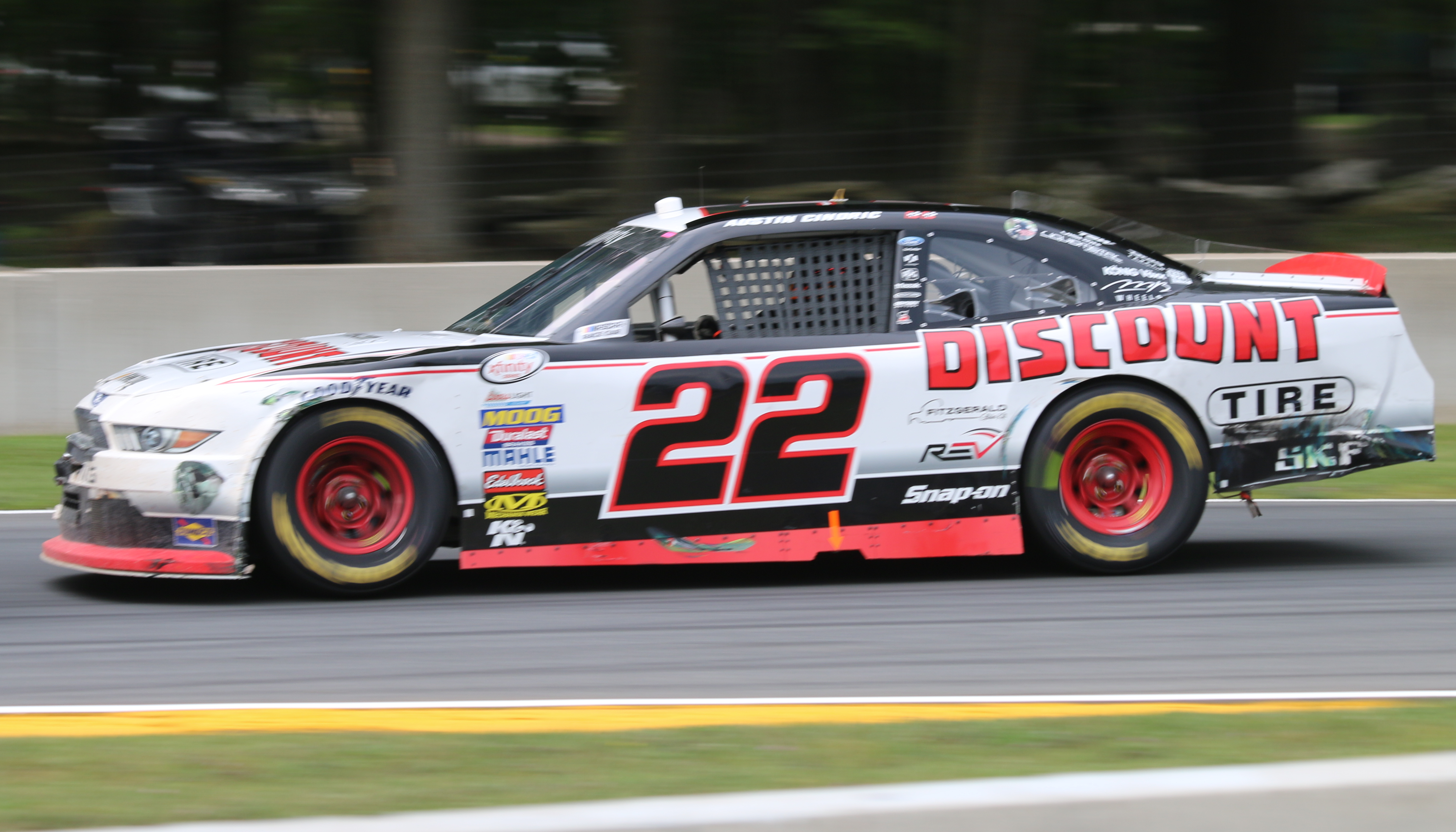
Cindric's No. 22 Xfinity Series car at Road America

In August 2017, Cindric joined Team Penske's No. 22 car for the Xfinity Series race at Road America.

In 2018, Cindric ran the full Xfinity schedule, splitting time between three different Ford Mustangs: Penske's No. 12 and No. 22 Fords, and the No. 60 Ford of Roush Fenway Racing. Cindric got his first pole at Iowa in the season's fourteenth race, where his No. 22 car had a history of success, though he faded back to eleventh in the race after finishing second in the first stage. He was involved in a violent crash in the Daytona race, in which he barrel-rolled twice in turn 2. In Cindric's last ride with the No. 60 Roush Fenway car at Darlington, he was turned by Ryan Truex exiting turn four on the third lap and spun out, resulting in a 40th-place finish. The car, split between Cindric, Chase Briscoe, and Ty Majeski, attracted notoriety during the season for being involved in numerous accidents, ending the year with 28: 22 brought out a caution flag, six spins that did not produce a caution, and four wrecks during practice or qualifying.

On November 8, 2018, Team Penske announced that Cindric would compete full-time in their No. 22 Ford Mustang in 2019. MoneyLion was the primary sponsor for eighteen races, part of a multi-year deal with the team.

In August 2019, Cindric scored his first career NASCAR Xfinity Series wins with back-to-back road course victories at Watkins Glen and Mid-Ohio. He finished the 2019 season sixth in points after finishing seventh at Homestead.

Cindric scored his first oval victories in July 2020 at Kentucky Speedway, where he swept the weekend's Xfinity races Shady Rays 200 and Alsco 300. He was the first driver to win national series races at the same track on two consecutive days since Richard Petty in 1971. The victories began a seven-race stretch in which he won or finished second, including his third straight win at Texas Motor Speedway after Kyle Busch's disqualification and back-to-back road course victories at Road America and the Daytona road course. He won the regular season championship with a tenth-place finish in the finale at Richmond and entered the playoffs with five wins. Cindric won at Phoenix to win the championship. Cindric also led the non-playoff points standings and led all drivers in top-fives (nineteen) and top-tens (26).

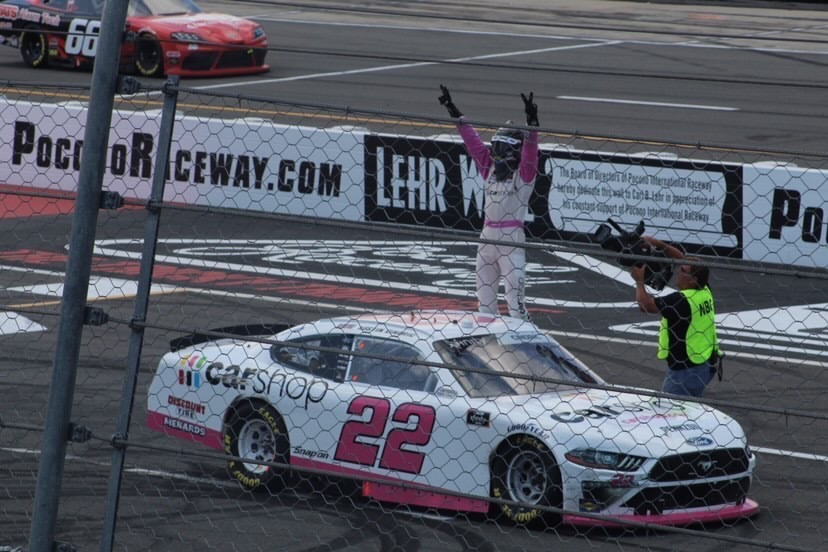
Cindric celebrating after winning the 2021 Pocono Green 225

Cindric would return to the No. 22 Ford Mustang in 2021. Cindric took his first win of 2021 at Daytona in February, followed by additional victories at Phoenix, Dover, Pocono, and the Indianapolis Road Course. He led much of the regular-season standings but finished runner-up in the regular-season finale at Bristol to A. J. Allmendinger when the two made contact coming to the finish and slid across the line.

Cindric lost the lead and the championship in turn three to Daniel Hemric on the last lap of Phoenix in 2021.

==== Cup Series ====
During the Monster Energy NASCAR Cup Series' 2019 Folds of Honor QuikTrip 500 weekend at Atlanta Motor Speedway, Cindric replaced Brad Keselowski for final practice as Keselowski was experiencing flu-like symptoms. Cindric remained on standby for the race, but Keselowski ran the full event and went on to win. In September, Cindric once again served as a practice substitute driver, this time for Michael McDowell at the Bank of America Roval 400 while McDowell was being treated for a kidney stone.

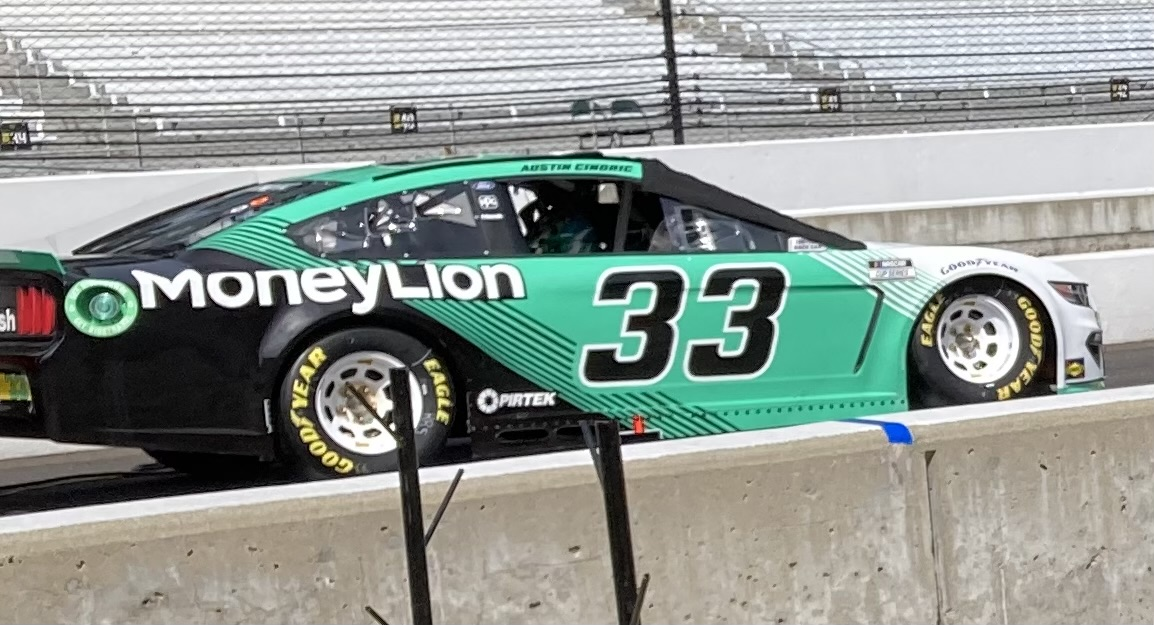
Cindric's No. 33 car at Indianapolis in 2021

In October 2020, Team Penske announced Cindric would begin racing in the Cup Series in 2021 on a part-time basis before moving up to the series full-time in 2022 in the Wood Brothers Racing No. 21, replacing Matt DiBenedetto. He would run his part-time schedule in the Cup Series in a part-time fourth car for Penske, the No. 33. Cindric's first Cup Series start came in the 2021 Daytona 500, where he finished fifteenth after being involved in a fiery last-lap crash. He led laps at Circuit of the Americas and Road America, and scored his first Cup top ten at Indianapolis when he finished ninth.

On July 15, 2021, Team Penske announced Cindric would instead drive the team's No. 2 car in 2022, replacing Brad Keselowski as he left to become the driver of the No. 6 car for Roush Fenway Racing as well as a co-owner of the team, which was renamed RFK Racing.

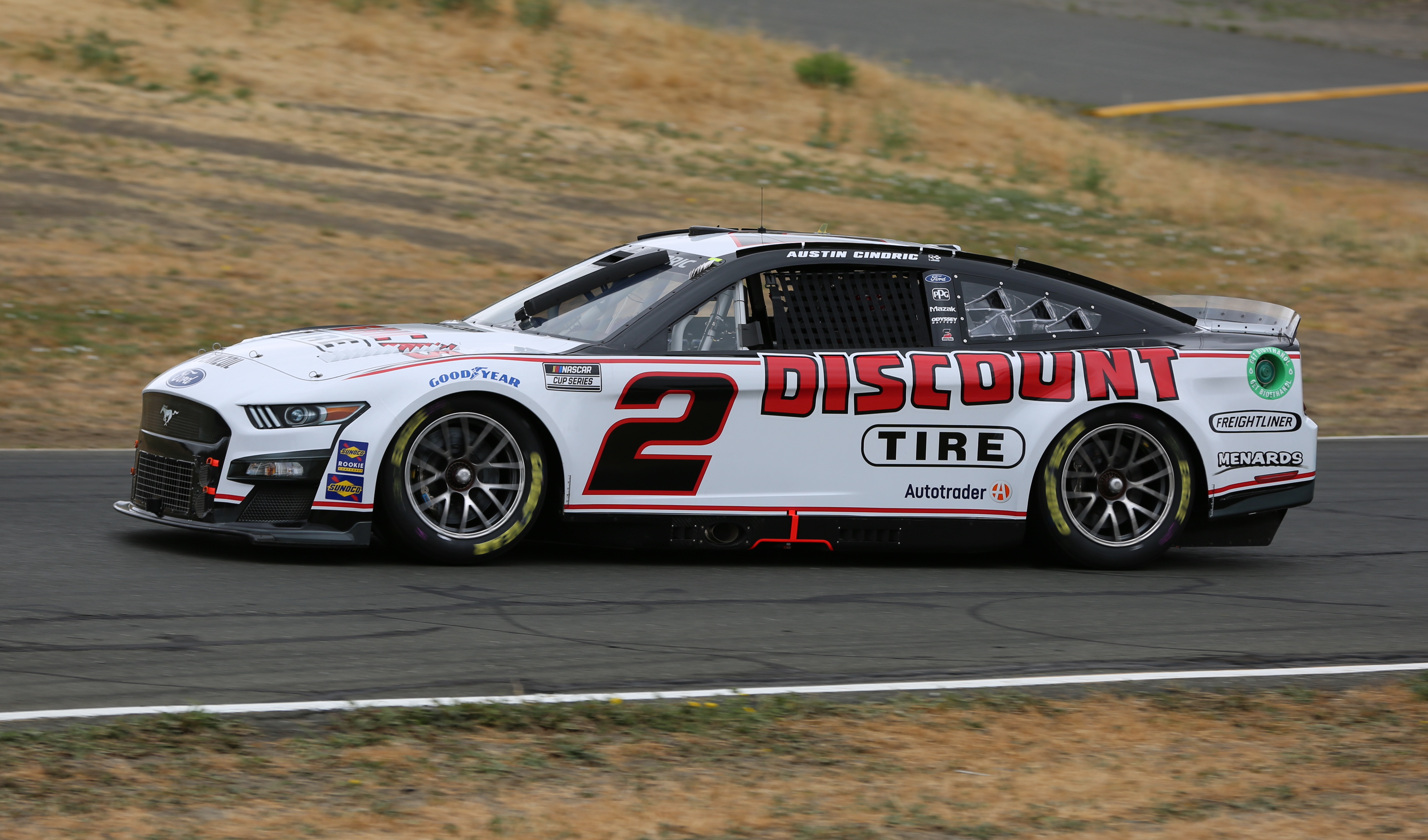
Cindric’s No. 2 car at Sonoma Raceway in 2022

On February 20, 2022, Cindric won the 2022 Daytona 500 in his first full-time Cup Series season driving for Team Penske. It was only his eighth Cup Series start. Cindric became the ninth driver to win his first Cup Series race in the Daytona 500. At the age of 23, Cindric also became the second-youngest driver in NASCAR history to win the Daytona 500. It was the third Daytona 500 win for Team Penske, which previously won the 2008 race with Ryan Newman, driving the No. 12 car, and the 2015 race with Joey Logano, driving the No. 22 car. It was also the first Daytona 500 win for Team Penske's flagship No. 2 car. The following week, Cindric won the pole at the Auto Club Speedway in Fontana, California and finished 12th. As a result of that finish, Cindric led the points again for two weeks in a row, becoming the second rookie in NASCAR history (after Jimmie Johnson) to lead the NASCAR Cup Series points standings in consecutive weeks. On July 20, crew chief Jeremy Bullins was suspended for four races due to a tire and wheel loss during the 2022 Ambetter 301 at Loudon. Cindric was eliminated in the Round of 12 after finishing 21st at the Charlotte Roval. He finished the season twelfth in the points standings and won the NASCAR Rookie of the Year honors.

Cindric started the 2023 Season with a 23rd-place finish in the 2023 Daytona 500. Cindric would struggle heavily throughout the season, rarely finishing inside the top ten in a race. Cindric would miss the playoffs as a result of his poor performance. After a disappointing season, he would finish 24th in the final points standings and only scored one top-five and five top-ten finishes the whole season.

Cindric started the 2024 season with a 22nd-place finish at the 2024 Daytona 500. He scored his second career win at Gateway after Christopher Bell lost an engine and Ryan Blaney ran out of gas, breaking an 85-race winless streak. He was eliminated from the Round of 12 at the conclusion of the Charlotte Roval race.

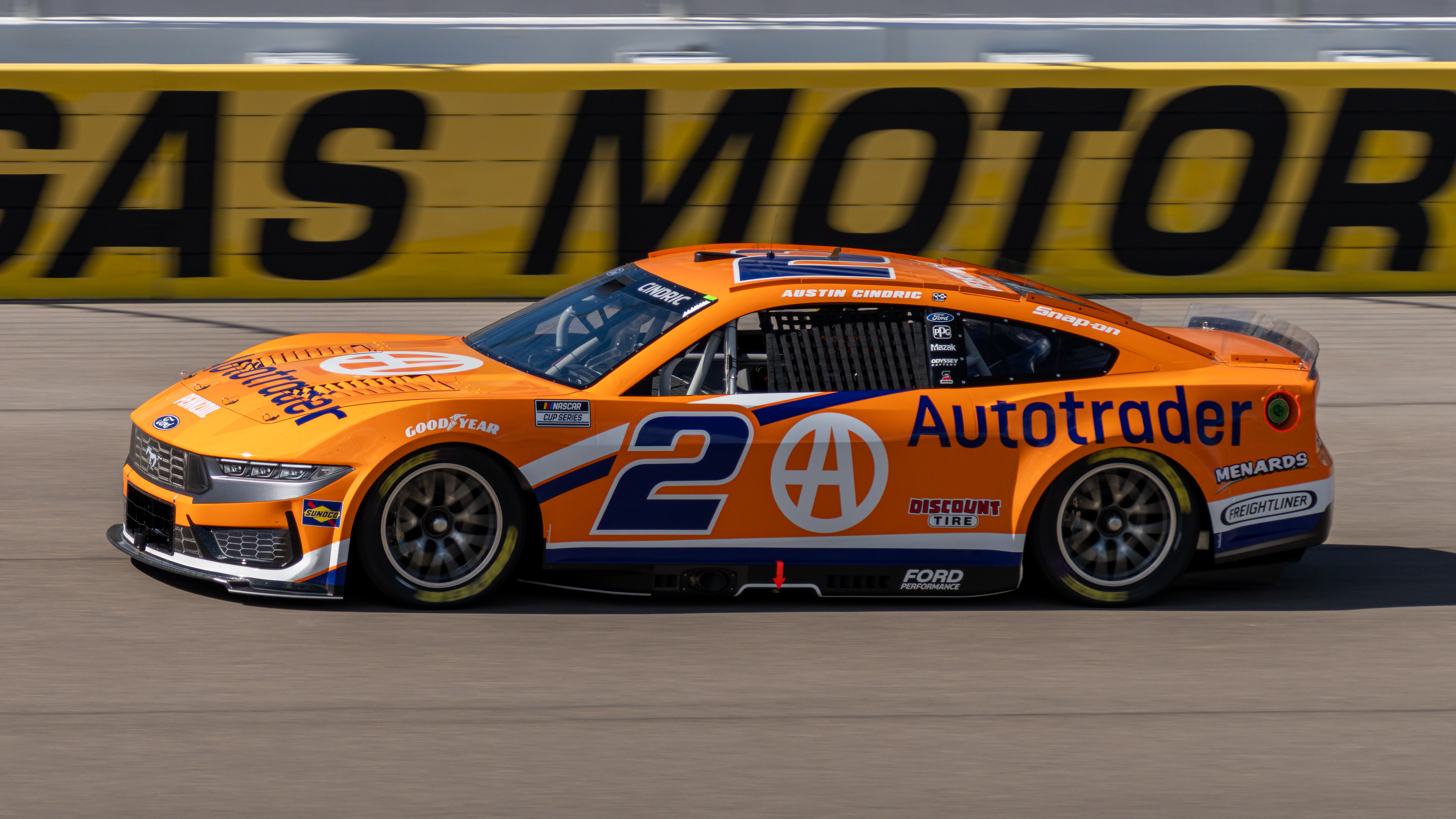
Cindric takes practice for the 2025 South Point 400

Cindric started the 2025 season with an eighth-place finish at the 2025 Daytona 500. Following the COTA race, he was docked 50 driver points and fined US$50,000 for right-rear hooking Ty Dillon. Cindric scored his first win of the season at Talladega after beating Ryan Preece by 0.022 to the finish line.

=== Supercars Championship ===
On September 3, 2025, 7News revealed that Cindric would contest the Supercars Championship finale at Adelaide, competing for Tickford Racing in a wildcard entry.

== Personal life ==
Cindric is the son of former Team Penske president Tim Cindric and the grandson of former IndyCar team owner and Red Roof Inn founder Jim Trueman. Cindric graduated from Cannon School in Concord, North Carolina on May 18, 2017, hours before he competed in the Truck Series race at the nearby Charlotte Motor Speedway.

== Racing record ==
=== American Open-Wheel racing results ===
(key) (Races in bold indicate pole position, races in italics indicate fastest race lap)

==== USF2000 National Championship results ====
Year	Entrant	1	2	3	4	5	6	7	8	9	10	11	12	13	14	Pos	Points
2013	Andretti Autosport	SEB; 24	SEB; 29	STP; 23	STP; 28	LOR; 22	TOR; 27	TOR; 13	MOH; 12	MOH; 15	MOH; 9	LAG; 20	LAG; 13	HOU; 8	HOU; 7	**17th**	**77**
2014	Pabst Racing Services	STP; 11	STP; 10	BAR; 9	BAR; 17	IMS; 8	IMS; 21	LOR; 2	TOR; 15	TOR; 18	MOH; 18	MOH; 6	MOH; 6	LAG; 12	LAG; 20	**14th**	**125**

=== Stock car career summary ===
Season	Series	Team	Races	Wins	Top 5	Top 10	Points	Position
2015	NASCAR Camping World Truck Series	Brad Keselowski Racing	2	0	0	0	49	51st
2015	ARCA Racing Series	Team Penske	2	0	1	1	365	67th
2016	NASCAR Camping World Truck Series	Brad Keselowski Racing	4	0	0	0	56	36th
2016	NASCAR K&N Pro Series East	Martin-McClure Racing	2	2	2	2	96	33rd
2016	ARCA Racing Series	Cunningham Motorsports	4	1	3	4	895	30th
2017	NASCAR Xfinity Series	Team Penske	1	0	0	0	0	NC†
2017	NASCAR Camping World Truck Series	Brad Keselowski Racing	23	1	8	16	4032	**3rd**
2017	ARCA Racing Series	Cunningham Motorsports	2	0	0	0	305	65th
2018	NASCAR Xfinity Series	Roush Fenway Racing	9	0	0	0	2231	8th
2018	NASCAR Xfinity Series	Team Penske	24	0	7	13	2231	8th
2019	NASCAR Xfinity Series	Team Penske	33	2	14	24	2294	6th
2020	NASCAR Xfinity Series	Team Penske	33	6	19	29	4040	**1st**
2021	NASCAR Cup Series	Team Penske	7	0	0	1	0	NC†
2021	NASCAR Xfinity Series	Team Penske	33	5	22	26	4035	**2nd**
2022	NASCAR Cup Series	Team Penske	36	1	5	9	2226	12th
2023	NASCAR Cup Series	Team Penske	36	0	1	5	626	24th
2024	NASCAR Cup Series	Team Penske	36	1	4	7	2247	11th
2025	NASCAR Cup Series	Team Penske	36	1	2	5	2156	14th
2026	NASCAR Cup Series	Team Penske	36	0	4	10	2306	10th

^{†} As Cindric was a guest driver, he was ineligible for championship points.

=== NASCAR ===
(key) (Bold - Pole position awarded by qualifying time. Italics – Pole position earned by points standings or practice time. * – Most laps led.)

==== Cup Series ====
NASCAR Cup Series results
Year	Team	No.	Make	1	2	3	4	5	6	7	8	9	10	11	12	13	14	15	16	17	18	19	20	21	22	23	24	25	26	27	28	29	30	31	32	33	34	35	36	NCSC	Pts	Ref
2019	Team Penske	2	Ford	DAY	ATL; RL^{†}	LVS	PHO	CAL	MAR	TEX	BRI	RCH	TAL	DOV	KAN	CLT	POC	MCH	SON	CHI	DAY	KEN	NHA	POC	GLN	MCH	BRI	DAR	IND	LVS	RCH									N/A	—	
2019	Front Row Motorsports	34	Ford																													ROV; RL^{‡}	DOV	TAL	KAN	MAR	TEX	PHO	HOM	N/A	—	
2021	Team Penske	33	Ford	DAY; 15	DRC	HOM	LVS	PHO	ATL; 22	BRD	MAR	RCH; 28	TAL	KAN; 22	DAR	DOV	COA; 25	CLT	SON	NSH	POC	POC	ROA; 38	ATL	NHA	GLN	IRC; 9	MCH	DAY	DAR	RCH	BRI	LVS	TAL	ROV	TEX	KAN	MAR	PHO	46th	0^{1}	
2022	Team Penske	2	Ford	DAY; 1	**CAL**; 12	LVS; 19	PHO; 24	ATL; 32	COA; 8	RCH; 20	MAR; 11	BRD; 16	TAL; 21	DOV; 36	DAR; 18	KAN; 11	CLT; 34	GTW; 11	SON; 5	NSH; 7	ROA; 7	ATL; 3	NHA; 13	POC; 31	IRC; 2	MCH; 37	RCH; 12	GLN; 13	DAY; 3	DAR; 16	KAN; 12	BRI; 20	TEX; 15	TAL; 9	ROV; 21	LVS; 29	HOM; 19	MAR; 26	PHO; 11	12th	2226	
2023	Team Penske	2	Ford	DAY; 23	CAL; 28	LVS; 6	PHO; 25	ATL; 11	COA; 6	RCH; 28	BRD; 19	MAR; 33	TAL; 26	DOV; 26	KAN; 31	DAR; 19	CLT; 31	GTW; 13	SON; 25	NSH; 27	CSC; 6	ATL; 12	NHA; 25	POC; 23	RCH; 26	MCH; 12	IRC; 15	GLN; 16	DAY; 37	DAR; 31	KAN; 31	BRI; 32	TEX; 27	TAL; 5	ROV; 25	LVS; 23	HOM; 12	MAR; 9	PHO; 35	24th	626	
2024	Team Penske	2	Ford	DAY; 22	ATL; 4	LVS; 29	PHO; 36	BRI; 31	COA; 18	RCH; 23	MAR; 23	TEX; 25	TAL; 23	DOV; 15	KAN; 37	DAR; 20	CLT; 20	GTW; 1	SON; 22	IOW; 30	NHA; 19	NSH; 15	CSC; 15	POC; 18	IND; 7	RCH; 24	MCH; 28	DAY; 18	DAR; 13	ATL; 10*	GLN; 10	BRI; 13	KAN; 34	TAL; 32*	ROV; 4	LVS; 34	HOM; 27	MAR; 4	PHO; 13	11th	2247	
2025	Team Penske	2	Ford	DAY; 8*	ATL; 28	COA; 25	PHO; 19	LVS; 6	HOM; 19	MAR; 37	DAR; 11	BRI; 17	TAL; 1	TEX; 25	KAN; 11	CLT; 31	NSH; 18	MCH; 31	MXC; 18	POC; 10	ATL; 38	CSC; 27	SON; 30	DOV; 16	IND; 15*	IOW; 12	GLN; 16	RCH; 5	DAY; 39	DAR; 12	GTW; 19	BRI; 30	NHA; 17	KAN; 30	ROV; 36	LVS; 11	TAL; 34	MAR; 15	PHO; 27	14th	2156	
2026	Team Penske	2	Ford	DAY; 34	ATL; 26	COA; 32	PHO; 34	LVS; 19	DAR; 5	MAR; 8	BRI; 16	KAN; 12	TAL; 8	TEX; 15	GLN; 9	CLT; 38	NSH; 26	MCH; 11	POC; 14	COR; 22	SON; 13	CHI; 13	ATL; 14	NWS; 14	IND; 14	IOW; 29	RCH; 3	NHA; 12	DAY; 6	DAR; 13	GTW; 10	BRI; 11	KAN; 2	LVS; 4	CLT; 17	PHO; 19	TAL; 27	MAR; 36	HOM; 7	10th	2306	
^{†} – Practiced for Brad Keselowski · ^{‡} – Practiced for Michael McDowell

===== Daytona 500 =====
Year	Team	Manufacturer	Start	Finish
2021	Team Penske	Ford	39	15
2022	Team Penske	Ford	5	**1**
2023	Team Penske	Ford	6	23
2024	Team Penske	Ford	6	22
2025	Team Penske	Ford	2	8*
2026	Team Penske	Ford	36	34

==== Xfinity Series ====
NASCAR Xfinity Series results
Year	Team	No.	Make	1	2	3	4	5	6	7	8	9	10	11	12	13	14	15	16	17	18	19	20	21	22	23	24	25	26	27	28	29	30	31	32	33	NXSC	Pts	Ref
2017	Team Penske	22	Ford	DAY	ATL	LVS	PHO	CAL	TEX	BRI	RCH	TAL	CLT	DOV	POC	MCH	IOW	DAY	KEN	NHA	IND	IOW	GLN	MOH	BRI	ROA; 16	DAR	RCH	CHI	KEN	DOV	CLT	KAN	TEX	PHO	HOM	104th	0^{1}	
2018	Roush Fenway Racing	60	Ford	DAY; 40		LVS; 34	PHO; 16	CAL; 28								MCH; 23			DAY; 33		NHA; 17		GLN; 13				DAR; 40										8th	2231	
2018	Team Penske	12	Ford		ATL; 7				TEX; 9					CLT; 16	POC; 4			CHI; 14		KEN; 10					BRI; 14			IND; 34									8th	2231	
2018	Team Penske	22	Ford							BRI; 12	RCH; 5	TAL; 30	DOV; 9				**IOW**; 11					IOW; 18		**MOH**; 2*		ROA; 37			LVS; 9	RCH; 13	**ROV**; 3	DOV; 8	KAN; 39	TEX; 3	PHO; 4	HOM; 5	8th	2231	
2019	Team Penske	22	Ford	DAY; 5	ATL; 10	LVS; 22	PHO; 5	CAL; 6	TEX; 11	BRI; 6	RCH; 2	TAL; 5	DOV; 6	CLT; 9	POC; 7	MCH; 11	IOW; 10	CHI; 5	DAY; 4	**KEN**; 14	NHA; 12	IOW; 37	GLN; 1	**MOH**; 1*	**BRI**; 5	ROA; 2	DAR; 10	IND; 27	LVS; 12	**RCH**; 2	ROV; 3	DOV; 3	KAN; 25	TEX; 3	PHO; 6	HOM; 7	6th	2294	
2020	Team Penske	22	Ford	DAY; 25	LVS; 2	CAL; 3	PHO; 8	DAR; 4	CLT; 3	BRI; 36	ATL; 16*	HOM; 2	HOM; 10	TAL; 4	POC; 29	IRC; 5	KEN; 1	KEN; 1*	TEX; 1	KAN; 2	ROA; 1*	DRC; 1	DOV; 2	DOV; 3	DAY; 8	DAR; 12	RCH; 4	RCH; 10	BRI; 3	LVS; 6	TAL; 34	ROV; 6	KAN; 28	TEX; 4	MAR; 10	PHO; 1	1st	4040	
2021	Team Penske	22	Ford	DAY; 1*	DRC; 2*	HOM; 5*	LVS; 4	PHO; 1*	ATL; 13	MAR; 6	TAL; 2*	DAR; 30	DOV; 1	COA; 5	CLT; 2	MOH; 14*	TEX; 3	NSH; 32	POC; 1*	ROA; 8	ATL; 10	NHA; 4	GLN; 3	IRC; 1*	MCH; 37	DAY; 39	DAR; 3	RCH; 16	BRI; 2	LVS; 4	TAL; 8	ROV; 2*	TEX; 5	KAN; 2*	MAR; 2	**PHO**; 2*	2nd	4035	

==== Camping World Truck Series ====
NASCAR Camping World Truck Series results
Year	Team	No.	Make	1	2	3	4	5	6	7	8	9	10	11	12	13	14	15	16	17	18	19	20	21	22	23	NCWTC	Pts	Ref
2015	Brad Keselowski Racing	29	Ford	DAY	ATL	MAR	KAN	CLT	DOV	TEX	GTW	IOW	KEN	ELD	POC	MCH	BRI	MSP	CHI	NHA	LVS	TAL	MAR; 25	TEX	PHO; 14	HOM	51st	49	
2016	Brad Keselowski Racing	2	Ford	DAY	ATL	MAR	KAN	DOV; DNQ	CLT	TEX	IOW	GTW	KEN	ELD	POC	BRI; 18	MCH	MSP; 23	CHI	NHA	LVS	TAL; 20	MAR	TEX	PHO; 15	HOM	36th	56	
2017	Brad Keselowski Racing	19	Ford	DAY; 27	ATL; 21	MAR; 21	KAN; 10	CLT; 13	DOV; 5	TEX; 25	GTW; 11	IOW; 8	KEN; 4	ELD; 10	POC; 7	MCH; 5	BRI; 9	**MSP**; 1*	CHI; 15	NHA; 8	LVS; 4	TAL; 5	MAR; 10	TEX; 2*	PHO; 9	HOM; 5	3rd	4032	

^{*} Season still in progress
^{1} Ineligible for series points

=== ARCA Racing Series ===
(key) (Bold – Pole position awarded by qualifying time. Italics – Pole position earned by points standings or practice time. * – Most laps led.)

ARCA Racing Series results
Year	Team	No.	Make	1	2	3	4	5	6	7	8	9	10	11	12	13	14	15	16	17	18	19	20	ARSC	Pts	Ref
2015	Team Penske	99	Ford	DAY	MOB	NSH	SLM	TAL	TOL	NJE	POC	MCH	CHI	WIN	IOW; 4	IRP	POC	BLN	ISF	DSF	SLM	KEN; 17	KAN	67th	365	
2016	Cunningham Motorsports	99	Ford	DAY	NSH	SLM	TAL	TOL	NJE	**POC**; 2	MCH	MAD	WIN	IOW	IRP	POC	BLN	ISF	DSF	SLM	CHI; 6	KEN; 1*	KAN; 2	30th	895	
2017	Cunningham Motorsports	99	Ford	DAY	NSH	SLM	TAL	TOL	ELK	POC	MCH	MAD	IOW	**IRP**; 23	POC	WIN	ISF	ROA; 12*	DSF	SLM	CHI	KEN	KAN	65th	305	

==== K&N Pro Series East ====
NASCAR K&N Pro Series East results
Year	Team	No.	Make	1	2	3	4	5	6	7	8	9	10	11	12	13	14	NKNPSEC	Pts	Ref
2016	Martin-McClure Racing	39	Toyota	NSM	MOB	GRE	BRI	**VIR**; 1*	DOM	STA	COL	NHA	IOW	**GLN**; 1**	GRE	NJM	DOV	33rd	96	

=== Complete Global Rallycross Championship results ===
(key)

==== Supercar ====
Year	Entrant	Car	1	2	3	4	5	6	7	8	9	10	11	12	GRC	Points
2017	Bryan Herta Rallysport	Ford Fiesta ST	MEM	LOU	THO1	THO2	OTT1	OTT2	INDY	AC1	AC2	SEA1; 8	SEA2; 4	LA	11th	102

==== GRC Lites ====
Year	Entrant	Car	1	2	3	4	5	6	7	8	9	10	11	12	Lites	Points
2015	Olsbergs MSE	Lites Ford Fiesta	FTA; 1	DAY1; 9	DAY2; 1	MCAS; 5	DET1; 3	DET2; 3	DC; 8	LA1; 2	LA2; 1	BAR1; 2	BAR2; 1	LV; 10	2nd	473

=== Complete WeatherTech SportsCar Championship results ===
(key) (Races in bold indicate pole position; races in italics indicate fastest lap)

Year	Team	Class	Make	Engine	1	2	3	4	5	6	7	8	9	10	11	12	Rank	Points
2017	3GT Racing	GTD	Lexus RC F GT3	Lexus 5.0 L V8	DAY; 14	SEB; 13	LBH	AUS	BEL	WGL; 6	MOS	LIM	ELK	VIR	LGA	ATL; 8	31st	85
2018	JDC-Miller MotorSports	P	Oreca 07	Gibson GK428 4.2 L V8	DAY; 6	SEB	LBH	MOH	BEL	WGL	MOS	ELK	LGA	ATL			52nd	25
2019	AIM Vasser Sullivan	GTD	Lexus RC F GT3	Lexus 5.0 L V8	DAY; 5	SEB	MOH	BEL	WGL	MOS	LIM	ELK	VIR	LGA	ATL		49th	26
2022	Proton USA	GTD Pro	Mercedes-AMG GT3 Evo	Mercedes-AMG M159 6.2 L V8	DAY; 5	SEB	LBH	LGA	WGL	MOS	LIM	ELK	VIR	PET			27th	290
2023	Rick Ware Racing	LMP2	Oreca 07	Gibson GK428 4.2 L V8	DAY; 6	SEB	LGA	WGL	ELK	IMS	PET						37th	0
2025	Ford Multimatic Motorsports	GTD Pro	Ford Mustang GT3	Ford Coyote 5.4 L V8	**DAY**; 3	SEB	LGA	DET	WGL	MOS	ELK	VIR	IMS	PET			26th	335

=== Supercars Championship results ===
Supercars results
Year	Team	No.	Car	1	2	3	4	5	6	7	8	9	10	11	12	13	14	15	16	17	18	19	20	21	22	23	24	25	26	27	28	29	30	31	32	33	34	Position	Points
2025	Tickford Racing	5	Ford Mustang S650	SYD; R1	SYD; R2	SYD; R3	MEL; R4	MEL; R5	MEL; R6	MEL; R7	TAU; R8	TAU; R9	TAU; R10	SYM; R11	SYM; R12	SYM; R13	BAR; R14	BAR; R15	BAR; R16	HID; R17	HID; R18	HID; R19	TOW; R20	TOW; R21	TOW; R22	QLD; R23	QLD; R24	QLD; R25	BEN; R26	BAT; R27	SUR; R28	SUR; R29	SAN; R30	SAN; R31	ADE; R32; 23	ADE; R33; 23	ADE; R34; 21	32nd	52

=== Complete Bathurst 12 Hour results ===
Year	Team	Co-drivers	Car	Class	Laps	Overall position	Class position
2015	(Australia) Erebus Motorsport	(Australia) Nathan Morcom (Australia) Simon Hodge	Mercedes-Benz SLS AMG	AA	251	21st	7th
2016	(Australia) Erebus Motorsport	(Germany) Maro Engel (Germany) Bernd Schneider	Mercedes-Benz SLS AMG	AP	219	DNF	DNF
