= 2022 Kwik Trip 250 =

NASCAR Cup Series race

Race details
- Race 18 of 36 in the 2022 NASCAR Cup Series
- The 2022 Kwik Trip 250 program cover, featuring Chase Elliott.
- Date: July 3, 2022
- Location: Road America in Elkhart Lake, Wisconsin
- Course: Permanent racing facility
- Course length: 4.048 miles (6.515 km)
- Distance: 62 laps, 250.48 mi (403.11 km)
- Average speed: 96.622 miles per hour (155.498 km/h)

Pole position
Driver	Chase Elliott	Hendrick Motorsports
- Time: 2:14.427

Most laps led
Driver	Chase Elliott	Hendrick Motorsports
- Laps: 37

Winner
No. 8	Tyler Reddick	Richard Childress Racing

Television in the United States
- Network: USA
- Announcers: Rick Allen, Jeff Burton, Steve Letarte, and Dale Earnhardt Jr.

Radio in the United States
- Radio: MRN
- Booth announcers: Alex Hayden and Jeff Striegle
- Turn announcers: Steve Post (1 & 2), Dave Moody (3 & 4), Mike Bagley (5 & 6), Eric Morse (7 & 8), Jason Toy (9 & 10), Kyle Rickey (11), Kurt Becker (12), Tim Catalfamo (13 & 14)

The 2022 Kwik Trip 250 was a NASCAR Cup Series race held on July 3, 2022, at Road America in Elkhart Lake, Wisconsin. Contested over 62 laps on the 4.048-mile (6.515 km) road course, it was the 18th race of the 2022 NASCAR Cup Series season.

== Report ==
=== Background ===
Road America, the track where the race was held.

Road America is a motorsport road course located near Elkhart Lake, Wisconsin on Wisconsin Highway 67. It has hosted races since the 1950s and currently hosts races in the NASCAR Xfinity Series, IMSA WeatherTech SportsCar Championship, SCCA Pirelli World Challenge, ASRA, AMA Superbike series, IndyCar Series, and SCCA Pro Racing's Trans-Am Series.

On September 15, 2021, the track announced that Jockey and Kwik Trip would switch places in the race's sponsorship, with Kwik Trip becoming the title sponsor and Jockey becoming the presenting sponsor.

==== Entry list ====
- (R) denotes rookie driver.
- (i) denotes driver who is ineligible for series driver points.

No.	Driver	Team	Manufacturer
1	Ross Chastain	Trackhouse Racing Team	Chevrolet
2	Austin Cindric (R)	Team Penske	Ford
3	Austin Dillon	Richard Childress Racing	Chevrolet
4	Kevin Harvick	Stewart-Haas Racing	Ford
5	Kyle Larson	Hendrick Motorsports	Chevrolet
6	Brad Keselowski	RFK Racing	Ford
7	Corey LaJoie	Spire Motorsports	Chevrolet
8	Tyler Reddick	Richard Childress Racing	Chevrolet
9	Chase Elliott	Hendrick Motorsports	Chevrolet
10	Aric Almirola	Stewart-Haas Racing	Ford
11	Denny Hamlin	Joe Gibbs Racing	Toyota
12	Ryan Blaney	Team Penske	Ford
14	Chase Briscoe	Stewart-Haas Racing	Ford
15	Joey Hand	Rick Ware Racing	Ford
16	A. J. Allmendinger (i)	Kaulig Racing	Chevrolet
17	Chris Buescher	RFK Racing	Ford
18	Kyle Busch	Joe Gibbs Racing	Toyota
19	Martin Truex Jr.	Joe Gibbs Racing	Toyota
20	Christopher Bell	Joe Gibbs Racing	Toyota
21	Harrison Burton (R)	Wood Brothers Racing	Ford
22	Joey Logano	Team Penske	Ford
23	Bubba Wallace	23XI Racing	Toyota
24	William Byron	Hendrick Motorsports	Chevrolet
27	Loris Hezemans (i)	Team Hezeberg Powered by Reaume Brothers Racing	Ford
31	Justin Haley	Kaulig Racing	Chevrolet
34	Michael McDowell	Front Row Motorsports	Ford
38	Todd Gilliland (R)	Front Row Motorsports	Ford
41	Cole Custer	Stewart-Haas Racing	Ford
42	Ty Dillon	Petty GMS Motorsports	Chevrolet
43	Erik Jones	Petty GMS Motorsports	Chevrolet
45	Kurt Busch	23XI Racing	Toyota
47	Ricky Stenhouse Jr.	JTG Daugherty Racing	Chevrolet
48	Alex Bowman	Hendrick Motorsports	Chevrolet
51	Cody Ware	Rick Ware Racing	Ford
77	Josh Bilicki (i)	Spire Motorsports	Chevrolet
78	Kyle Tilley	Live Fast Motorsports	Ford
99	Daniel Suárez	Trackhouse Racing Team	Chevrolet
Official entry list

== Practice ==
Chase Briscoe was the fastest in the practice session with a time of 2:14.663 seconds and a speed of 108.217 mph (174.158 km/h).

=== Practice results ===
Pos	No.	Driver	Team	Manufacturer	Time	Speed
1	14	Chase Briscoe	Stewart-Haas Racing	Ford	2:14.663	108.217
2	8	Tyler Reddick	Richard Childress Racing	Chevrolet	2:14.943	107.992
3	1	Ross Chastain	Trackhouse Racing Team	Chevrolet	2:15.262	107.738
Official practice results

== Qualifying ==
Chase Elliott scored the pole for the race with a time of 2:14.427 and a speed of 108.407 mph (174.464 km/h).

=== Qualifying results ===
Pos	No.	Driver	Team	Manufacturer	R1	R2
1	9	Chase Elliott	Hendrick Motorsports	Chevrolet	2:14.711	2:14.427
2	14	Chase Briscoe	Stewart-Haas Racing	Ford	2:14.175	2:14.465
3	5	Kyle Larson	Hendrick Motorsports	Chevrolet	2:14.700	2:14.672
4	8	Tyler Reddick	Richard Childress Racing	Chevrolet	2:14.686	2:14.740
5	2	Austin Cindric (R)	Team Penske	Ford	2:14.769	2:14.780
6	34	Michael McDowell	Front Row Motorsports	Ford	2:14.647	2:14.793
7	17	Chris Buescher	RFK Racing	Ford	2:14.561	2:15.112
8	48	Alex Bowman	Hendrick Motorsports	Chevrolet	2:14.607	2:15.199
9	15	Joey Hand	Rick Ware Racing	Ford	2:14.848	2:15.249
10	41	Cole Custer	Stewart-Haas Racing	Ford	2:14.988	2:15.586
11	6	Brad Keselowski	RFK Racing	Ford	2:14.907	—
12	1	Ross Chastain	Trackhouse Racing Team	Chevrolet	2:14.929	—
13	18	Kyle Busch	Joe Gibbs Racing	Toyota	2:14.979	—
14	11	Denny Hamlin	Joe Gibbs Racing	Toyota	2:15.043	—
15	19	Martin Truex Jr.	Joe Gibbs Racing	Toyota	2:15.092	—
16	20	Christopher Bell	Joe Gibbs Racing	Toyota	2:15.106	—
17	99	Daniel Suárez	Trackhouse Racing Team	Chevrolet	2:15.231	—
18	22	Joey Logano	Team Penske	Ford	2:15.234	—
19	12	Ryan Blaney	Team Penske	Ford	2:15.371	—
20	3	Austin Dillon	Richard Childress Racing	Chevrolet	2:15.396	—
21	16	A. J. Allmendinger (i)	Kaulig Racing	Chevrolet	2:15.419	—
22	45	Kurt Busch	23XI Racing	Toyota	2:15.471	—
23	21	Harrison Burton (R)	Wood Brothers Racing	Ford	2:15.483	—
24	10	Aric Almirola	Stewart-Haas Racing	Ford	2:15.641	—
25	23	Bubba Wallace	23XI Racing	Toyota	2:15.663	—
26	77	Josh Bilicki (i)	Spire Motorsports	Chevrolet	2:15.700	—
27	43	Erik Jones	Petty GMS Motorsports	Chevrolet	2:15.710	—
28	4	Kevin Harvick	Stewart-Haas Racing	Ford	2:15.780	—
29	24	William Byron	Hendrick Motorsports	Chevrolet	2:15.857	—
30	42	Ty Dillon	Petty GMS Motorsports	Chevrolet	2:16.158	—
31	51	Cody Ware	Rick Ware Racing	Ford	2:16.202	—
32	38	Todd Gilliland (R)	Front Row Motorsports	Ford	2:16.222	—
33	47	Ricky Stenhouse Jr.	JTG Daugherty Racing	Chevrolet	2:16.279	—
34	31	Justin Haley	Kaulig Racing	Chevrolet	2:16.528	—
35	7	Corey LaJoie	Spire Motorsports	Chevrolet	2:16.560	—
36	27	Loris Hezemans (i)	Team Hezeberg Powered by Reaume Brothers Racing	Ford	2:18.129	—
37	78	Kyle Tilley	Live Fast Motorsports	Ford	2:20.402	—
Official qualifying results

== Race ==
=== Stage Results ===
Stage One Laps: 15

Pos	No	Driver	Team	Manufacturer	Points
1	14	Chase Briscoe	Stewart-Haas Racing	Ford	10
2	2	Austin Cindric (R)	Team Penske	Ford	9
3	48	Alex Bowman	Hendrick Motorsports	Chevrolet	8
4	22	Joey Logano	Team Penske	Ford	7
5	45	Kurt Busch	23XI Racing	Toyota	6
6	21	Harrison Burton (R)	Wood Brothers Racing	Ford	5
7	23	Bubba Wallace	23XI Racing	Toyota	4
8	43	Erik Jones	Petty GMS Motorsports	Chevrolet	3
9	31	Justin Haley	Kaulig Racing	Chevrolet	2
10	9	Chase Elliott	Hendrick Motorsports	Chevrolet	1
Official stage one results

Stage Two Laps: 15

Pos	No	Driver	Team	Manufacturer	Points
1	12	Ryan Blaney	Team Penske	Ford	10
2	15	Joey Hand	Rick Ware Racing	Ford	9
3	42	Ty Dillon	Petty GMS Motorsports	Chevrolet	8
4	45	Kurt Busch	23XI Racing	Toyota	7
5	43	Erik Jones	Petty GMS Motorsports	Chevrolet	6
6	31	Justin Haley	Kaulig Racing	Chevrolet	5
7	21	Harrison Burton (R)	Wood Brothers Racing	Ford	4
8	23	Bubba Wallace	23XI Racing	Toyota	3
9	9	Chase Elliott	Hendrick Motorsports	Chevrolet	2
10	8	Tyler Reddick	Richard Childress Racing	Chevrolet	1
Official stage two results

=== Final Stage Results ===
Stage Three Laps: 32

Pos	Grid	No	Driver	Team	Manufacturer	Laps	Points
1	4	8	Tyler Reddick	Richard Childress Racing	Chevrolet	62	41
2	1	9	Chase Elliott	Hendrick Motorsports	Chevrolet	62	38
3	3	5	Kyle Larson	Hendrick Motorsports	Chevrolet	62	34
4	12	1	Ross Chastain	Trackhouse Racing Team	Chevrolet	62	33
5	17	99	Daniel Suárez	Trackhouse Racing Team	Chevrolet	62	32
6	7	17	Chris Buescher	RFK Racing	Ford	62	31
7	5	2	Austin Cindric (R)	Team Penske	Ford	62	39
8	6	34	Michael McDowell	Front Row Motorsports	Ford	62	29
9	21	16	A. J. Allmendinger (i)	Kaulig Racing	Chevrolet	62	0
10	28	4	Kevin Harvick	Stewart-Haas Racing	Ford	62	27
11	19	12	Ryan Blaney	Team Penske	Ford	62	36
12	8	48	Alex Bowman	Hendrick Motorsports	Chevrolet	62	33
13	15	19	Martin Truex Jr.	Joe Gibbs Racing	Toyota	62	24
14	2	14	Chase Briscoe	Stewart-Haas Racing	Ford	62	33
15	10	41	Cole Custer	Stewart-Haas Racing	Ford	62	22
16	29	24	William Byron	Hendrick Motorsports	Chevrolet	62	21
17	14	11	Denny Hamlin	Joe Gibbs Racing	Toyota	62	20
18	16	20	Christopher Bell	Joe Gibbs Racing	Toyota	62	19
19	33	47	Ricky Stenhouse Jr.	JTG Daugherty Racing	Chevrolet	62	18
20	30	42	Ty Dillon	Petty GMS Motorsports	Chevrolet	62	25
21	9	15	Joey Hand	Rick Ware Racing	Ford	62	25
22	23	21	Harrison Burton (R)	Wood Brothers Racing	Ford	62	24
23	22	45	Kurt Busch	23XI Racing	Toyota	62	27
24	34	31	Justin Haley	Kaulig Racing	Chevrolet	62	20
25	32	38	Todd Gilliland (R)	Front Row Motorsports	Ford	62	12
26	27	43	Erik Jones	Petty GMS Motorsports	Chevrolet	62	20
27	18	22	Joey Logano	Team Penske	Ford	62	17
28	24	10	Aric Almirola	Stewart-Haas Racing	Ford	62	9
29	13	18	Kyle Busch	Joe Gibbs Racing	Toyota	62	8
30	37	78	Kyle Tilley	Live Fast Motorsports	Ford	61	7
31	20	3	Austin Dillon	Richard Childress Racing	Chevrolet	60	6
32	31	51	Cody Ware	Rick Ware Racing	Ford	59	5
33	11	6	Brad Keselowski	RFK Racing	Ford	58	4
34	35	7	Corey LaJoie	Spire Motorsports	Chevrolet	57	3
35	25	23	Bubba Wallace	23XI Racing	Toyota	54	9
36	26	77	Josh Bilicki (i)	Spire Motorsports	Chevrolet	52	0
37	36	27	Loris Hezemans (i)	Team Hezeberg Powered by Reaume Brothers Racing	Ford	9	0
Official race results

=== Race statistics ===
- Lead changes: 8 among 6 different drivers
- Cautions/Laps: 2 for 2
- Red flags: 0
- Time of race: 2 hours, 35 minutes and 51 seconds
- Average speed: 96.622 miles per hour (155.498 km/h)

== Media ==
=== Television ===
USA covered the race on the television side. Rick Allen, Jeff Burton, Steve Letarte, and Dale Earnhardt Jr. called the race from the broadcast booth. Kim Coon, Parker Kligerman and Marty Snider handled the pit road duties from pit lane. Rutledge Wood served as a “CityView” reporter and share stories from the track.

USA
Booth announcers	Pit reporters	Cityview reporter
Lap-by-lap: Rick Allen; Color-commentator: Jeff Burton; Color-commentator: Steve Letarte; Color-commentator: Dale Earnhardt Jr.	Kim Coon; Parker Kligerman; Marty Snider	Rutledge Wood

=== Radio ===
Radio coverage of the race was broadcast by Motor Racing Network (MRN) and was simulcast on Sirius XM NASCAR Radio.

MRN
Booth announcers	Turn announcers	Pit reporters
Lead announcer: Alex Hayden; Announcer: Jeff Striegle	Turn 1 & 2: Steve Post; Turns 3 & 4: Dave Moody; Turns 5 & 6: Mike Bagley; Turns 7 & 8: Eric Morse; Turns 9 & 10: Jason Toy; Turn 11: Kyle Rickey; Turn 12: Kurt Becker; Turns 13 & 14: Tim Catalfamo	Winston Kelley; Chris Wilner; Woody Cain; Glenn Jarrett

== Standings after the race ==
Drivers' Championship standings

	Pos	Driver	Points
	1	Chase Elliott	624
1	2	Ryan Blaney	591 (–33)
1	3	Ross Chastain	589 (–35)
2	4	Kyle Larson	553 (–71)
	5	Joey Logano	551 (–73)
2	6	Kyle Busch	547 (–77)
	7	Martin Truex Jr.	540 (–84)
	8	Christopher Bell	499 (–125)
1	9	Alex Bowman	494 (–130)
1	10	William Byron	489 (–135)
	11	Kevin Harvick	479 (–145)
	12	Aric Almirola	452 (–172)
	13	Tyler Reddick	441 (–183)
3	14	Austin Cindric	431 (–193)
	15	Kurt Busch	424 (–200)
2	16	Chase Briscoe	422 (–202)
Official driver's standings

Manufacturers' Championship standings

Pos	Manufacturer	Points
1	Chevrolet	662
2	Ford	606 (–56)
3	Toyota	599 (–63)

- Note: Only the first 16 positions are included for the driver standings.
- . – Driver has clinched a position in the NASCAR Cup Series playoffs.

EDIT: Denny Hamlin and Daniel Suarez both have wins at this point in the season. They have clinched positions in the playoffs, pushing Almirola and Harvick out.

Previous race: 2022 Ally 400	NASCAR Cup Series; 2022 season	Next race: 2022 Quaker State 400
