= 2021 EchoPark Texas Grand Prix =

NASCAR Cup Series race

2021 EchoPark Automotive Texas Grand Prix
Race details
- Race 14 of 36 in the 2021 NASCAR Cup Series
- 2021 EchoPark Texas Grand Prix program cover
- Date: May 23, 2021
- Location: Circuit of the Americas in Austin, Texas
- Course: Permanent racing facility
- Course length: 3.41 miles (5.488 km)
- Distance: 54 laps, 184.14 mi (296.345 km)
- Scheduled distance: 68 laps, 231.88 mi (373.175 km)
- Average speed: 59.024 miles per hour (94.990 km/h)

Pole position
Driver	Tyler Reddick	Richard Childress Racing
- Time: 2:12.911

Most laps led
Driver	Joey Logano	Team Penske
- Laps: 14

Winner
No. 9	Chase Elliott	Hendrick Motorsports

Television in the United States
- Network: FS1
- Announcers: Mike Joy, Jeff Gordon and Clint Bowyer

Radio in the United States
- Radio: PRN
- Booth announcers: Doug Rice and Mark Garrow
- Turn announcers: Rob Albright (1), Brett McMillan (2 to Becketts), Doug Turnbull (Chapel to S do Senna), Ralph Sheheen (To Sepang Hairpin), Pat Patterson (Motodrom) and Brad Gillie (Istanbul 8 to Turn 20)

The 2021 EchoPark Texas Grand Prix was a NASCAR Cup Series race that was held on May 23, 2021, at Circuit of the Americas in Austin, Texas. Originally scheduled for 68 laps on the 3.41-mile (5.49-kilometre) road course, the race was shortened to 54 laps by heavy rain. It was the 14th race of the 2021 NASCAR Cup Series season.

== Report ==
=== Background ===
Circuit of the Americas, the track where the race was held.

Circuit of the Americas (COTA) is a grade 1 FIA-specification motorsports facility located within the extraterritorial jurisdiction of Austin, Texas. It features a 3.41-mile (5.49 km) road racing circuit. The facility is home to the Formula One United States Grand Prix, and the Motorcycle Grand Prix of the Americas, a round of the FIM Road Racing World Championship. It previously hosted the Supercars Championship, the FIA World Endurance Championship, the IMSA SportsCar Championship, and IndyCar Series.

On September 30, 2020, it was announced that COTA would host a NASCAR Cup Series event for the first time on May 23, 2021. The lower Xfinity and Camping World Truck Series were also added as support events. On December 11, 2020, it was announced that NASCAR would run the full 3.41 mile course.

British IMSA driver Kyle Tilley made his NASCAR debut, replacing B. J. McLeod for Live Fast Motorsports.

==== Entry list ====
- (R) denotes rookie driver.
- (i) denotes driver who are ineligible for series driver points.

No.	Driver	Team	Manufacturer
00	Quin Houff	StarCom Racing	Chevrolet
1	Kurt Busch	Chip Ganassi Racing	Chevrolet
2	Brad Keselowski	Team Penske	Ford
3	Austin Dillon	Richard Childress Racing	Chevrolet
4	Kevin Harvick	Stewart-Haas Racing	Ford
5	Kyle Larson	Hendrick Motorsports	Chevrolet
6	Ryan Newman	Roush Fenway Racing	Ford
7	Corey LaJoie	Spire Motorsports	Chevrolet
8	Tyler Reddick	Richard Childress Racing	Chevrolet
9	Chase Elliott	Hendrick Motorsports	Chevrolet
10	Aric Almirola	Stewart-Haas Racing	Ford
11	Denny Hamlin	Joe Gibbs Racing	Toyota
12	Ryan Blaney	Team Penske	Ford
14	Chase Briscoe (R)	Stewart-Haas Racing	Ford
15	James Davison	Rick Ware Racing	Chevrolet
16	A. J. Allmendinger (i)	Kaulig Racing	Chevrolet
17	Chris Buescher	Roush Fenway Racing	Ford
18	Kyle Busch	Joe Gibbs Racing	Toyota
19	Martin Truex Jr.	Joe Gibbs Racing	Toyota
20	Christopher Bell	Joe Gibbs Racing	Toyota
21	Matt DiBenedetto	Wood Brothers Racing	Ford
22	Joey Logano	Team Penske	Ford
23	Bubba Wallace	23XI Racing	Toyota
24	William Byron	Hendrick Motorsports	Chevrolet
33	Austin Cindric (i)	Team Penske	Ford
34	Michael McDowell	Front Row Motorsports	Ford
37	Ryan Preece	JTG Daugherty Racing	Chevrolet
38	Anthony Alfredo (R)	Front Row Motorsports	Ford
41	Cole Custer	Stewart-Haas Racing	Ford
42	Ross Chastain	Chip Ganassi Racing	Chevrolet
43	Erik Jones	Richard Petty Motorsports	Chevrolet
47	Ricky Stenhouse Jr.	JTG Daugherty Racing	Chevrolet
48	Alex Bowman	Hendrick Motorsports	Chevrolet
51	Cody Ware (i)	Petty Ware Racing	Chevrolet
52	Josh Bilicki	Rick Ware Racing	Ford
53	Garrett Smithley (i)	Rick Ware Racing	Ford
77	Justin Haley (i)	Spire Motorsports	Chevrolet
78	Kyle Tilley	Live Fast Motorsports	Ford
96	Ty Dillon (i)	Gaunt Brothers Racing	Toyota
99	Daniel Suárez	Trackhouse Racing Team	Chevrolet
Official entry list

== Practice ==
In a wet practice session, William Byron was the fastest in the practice session with a time of 2:37.694 with an average speed of 77.847 mph (125.283 km/h).

=== Practice results ===
Pos	No.	Driver	Team	Manufacturer	Time	Speed
1	24	William Byron	Hendrick Motorsports	Chevrolet	2:37.694	77.847
2	22	Joey Logano	Team Penske	Ford	2:38.281	77.558
3	5	Kyle Larson	Hendrick Motorsports	Chevrolet	2:38.468	77.467
Official practice results

== Qualifying ==
In a dry track, Tyler Reddick scored the pole for the race with a time of 2:12.911 and a speed of 92.363 mph (148.644 km/h).

NASCAR also implemented a new rule for qualifying. For road course qualifying, a timing loop marked on the circuit, not the start-finish line, will set official time. The rule is similar to that used by INDYCAR, which also uses knockout qualifying. At this circuit, the exit of Istanbul 8 will be used as the timing line.

=== Qualifying results ===
Pos	No.	Driver	Team	Manufacturer	R1	R2
1	8	Tyler Reddick	Richard Childress Racing	Chevrolet	2:13.602	2:12.911
2	5	Kyle Larson	Hendrick Motorsports	Chevrolet	2:14.192	2:13.011
3	33	Austin Cindric (i)	Team Penske	Ford	2:13.850	2:13.697
4	18	Kyle Busch	Joe Gibbs Racing	Toyota	2:13.905	2:13.708
5	24	William Byron	Hendrick Motorsports	Chevrolet	2:14.127	2:13.760
6	22	Joey Logano	Team Penske	Ford	2:13.977	2:13.791
7	16	A. J. Allmendinger (i)	Kaulig Racing	Chevrolet	2:13.490	2:13.842
8	9	Chase Elliott	Hendrick Motorsports	Chevrolet	2:14.352	2:14.117
9	12	Ryan Blaney	Team Penske	Ford	2:14.486	2:14.518
10	20	Christopher Bell	Joe Gibbs Racing	Toyota	2:14.349	2:14.548
11	4	Kevin Harvick	Stewart-Haas Racing	Ford	2:14.352	2:14.792
12	48	Alex Bowman	Hendrick Motorsports	Chevrolet	2:14.578	2:14.894
13	1	Kurt Busch	Chip Ganassi Racing	Chevrolet	2:14.708	—
14	41	Cole Custer	Stewart-Haas Racing	Ford	2:15.025	—
15	99	Daniel Suárez	Trackhouse Racing Team	Chevrolet	2:15.118	—
16	3	Austin Dillon	Richard Childress Racing	Chevrolet	2:15.325	—
17	19	Martin Truex Jr.	Joe Gibbs Racing	Toyota	2:15.375	—
18	23	Bubba Wallace	23XI Racing	Toyota	2:15.416	—
19	11	Denny Hamlin	Joe Gibbs Racing	Toyota	2:15.528	—
20	42	Ross Chastain	Chip Ganassi Racing	Chevrolet	2:15.685	—
21	21	Matt DiBenedetto	Wood Brothers Racing	Ford	2:15.852	—
22	47	Ricky Stenhouse Jr.	JTG Daugherty Racing	Chevrolet	2:15.852	—
23	34	Michael McDowell	Front Row Motorsports	Ford	2:15.902	—
24	2	Brad Keselowski	Team Penske	Ford	2:15.929	—
25	7	Corey LaJoie	Spire Motorsports	Chevrolet	2:16.245	—
26	10	Aric Almirola	Stewart-Haas Racing	Ford	2:16.558	—
27	14	Chase Briscoe (R)	Stewart-Haas Racing	Ford	2:16.686	—
28	17	Chris Buescher	Roush Fenway Racing	Ford	2:16.728	—
29	43	Erik Jones	Richard Petty Motorsports	Chevrolet	2:17.032	—
30	77	Justin Haley (i)	Spire Motorsports	Chevrolet	2:17.051	—
31	52	Josh Bilicki	Rick Ware Racing	Ford	2:17.246	—
32	15	James Davison	Rick Ware Racing	Chevrolet	2:17.563	—
33	96	Ty Dillon (i)	Gaunt Brothers Racing	Toyota	2:17.682	—
34	6	Ryan Newman	Roush Fenway Racing	Ford	2:18.067	—
35	51	Cody Ware (i)	Petty Ware Racing	Chevrolet	2:18.194	—
36	37	Ryan Preece	JTG Daugherty Racing	Chevrolet	2:18.252	—
37	38	Anthony Alfredo (R)	Front Row Motorsports	Ford	2:18.701	—
38	53	Garrett Smithley (i)	Rick Ware Racing	Ford	2:18.804	—
39	78	Kyle Tilley	Live Fast Motorsports	Ford	2:20.361	—
40	00	Quin Houff	StarCom Racing	Chevrolet	2:20.985	—
Official qualifying results

== Race ==
=== Stage Results ===
Stage One Laps: 15

Pos	No	Driver	Team	Manufacturer	Points
1	22	Joey Logano	Team Penske	Ford	10
2	34	Michael McDowell	Front Row Motorsports	Ford	9
3	1	Kurt Busch	Chip Ganassi Racing	Chevrolet	8
4	5	Kyle Larson	Hendrick Motorsports	Chevrolet	7
5	33	Austin Cindric (i)	Team Penske	Ford	0
6	17	Chris Buescher	Roush Fenway Racing	Ford	5
7	14	Chase Briscoe (R)	Stewart-Haas Racing	Ford	4
8	42	Ross Chastain	Chip Ganassi Racing	Chevrolet	3
9	18	Kyle Busch	Joe Gibbs Racing	Toyota	2
10	21	Matt DiBenedetto	Wood Brothers Racing	Ford	1
Official stage one results

Stage Two Laps: 17

Pos	No	Driver	Team	Manufacturer	Points
1	18	Kyle Busch	Joe Gibbs Racing	Toyota	10
2	9	Chase Elliott	Hendrick Motorsports	Chevrolet	9
3	8	Tyler Reddick	Richard Childress Racing	Chevrolet	8
4	33	Austin Cindric (i)	Team Penske	Ford	0
5	7	Corey LaJoie	Spire Motorsports	Chevrolet	6
6	5	Kyle Larson	Hendrick Motorsports	Chevrolet	5
7	37	Ryan Preece	JTG Daugherty Racing	Chevrolet	4
8	16	A. J. Allmendinger (i)	Kaulig Racing	Chevrolet	0
9	14	Chase Briscoe (R)	Stewart-Haas Racing	Ford	2
10	48	Alex Bowman	Hendrick Motorsports	Chevrolet	1
Official stage two results

=== Final Stage Results ===
Stage Three Laps: 36

Pos	Grid	No	Driver	Team	Manufacturer	Laps	Points
1	8	9	Chase Elliott	Hendrick Motorsports	Chevrolet	54	49
2	2	5	Kyle Larson	Hendrick Motorsports	Chevrolet	54	47
3	6	22	Joey Logano	Team Penske	Ford	54	44
4	20	42	Ross Chastain	Chip Ganassi Racing	Chevrolet	54	36
5	7	16	A. J. Allmendinger (i)	Kaulig Racing	Chevrolet	54	0
6	27	14	Chase Briscoe (R)	Stewart-Haas Racing	Ford	54	37
7	23	34	Michael McDowell	Front Row Motorsports	Ford	54	39
8	12	48	Alex Bowman	Hendrick Motorsports	Chevrolet	54	30
9	1	8	Tyler Reddick	Richard Childress Racing	Chevrolet	54	36
10	4	18	Kyle Busch	Joe Gibbs Racing	Toyota	54	39
11	5	24	William Byron	Hendrick Motorsports	Chevrolet	54	26
12	16	3	Austin Dillon	Richard Childress Racing	Chevrolet	54	25
13	28	17	Chris Buescher	Roush Fenway Racing	Ford	54	29
14	19	11	Denny Hamlin	Joe Gibbs Racing	Toyota	54	23
15	36	37	Ryan Preece	JTG Daugherty Racing	Chevrolet	54	26
16	29	43	Erik Jones	Richard Petty Motorsports	Chevrolet	54	21
17	9	12	Ryan Blaney	Team Penske	Ford	54	20
18	37	38	Anthony Alfredo (R)	Front Row Motorsports	Ford	54	19
19	24	2	Brad Keselowski	Team Penske	Ford	54	18
20	25	7	Corey LaJoie	Spire Motorsports	Chevrolet	54	23
21	33	96	Ty Dillon (i)	Gaunt Brothers Racing	Toyota	54	0
22	22	47	Ricky Stenhouse Jr.	JTG Daugherty Racing	Chevrolet	54	15
23	21	21	Matt DiBenedetto	Wood Brothers Racing	Ford	54	15
24	34	6	Ryan Newman	Roush Fenway Racing	Ford	54	13
25	3	33	Austin Cindric (i)	Team Penske	Ford	54	0
26	26	10	Aric Almirola	Stewart-Haas Racing	Ford	54	11
27	13	1	Kurt Busch	Chip Ganassi Racing	Chevrolet	54	18
28	38	53	Garrett Smithley (i)	Rick Ware Racing	Ford	54	0
29	32	15	James Davison	Rick Ware Racing	Chevrolet	54	8
30	31	52	Josh Bilicki	Rick Ware Racing	Ford	54	7
31	39	78	Kyle Tilley	Live Fast Motorsports	Ford	54	6
32	35	51	Cody Ware (i)	Petty Ware Racing	Chevrolet	53	0
33	15	99	Daniel Suárez	Trackhouse Racing Team	Chevrolet	46	4
34	40	00	Quin Houff	StarCom Racing	Chevrolet	38	3
35	17	19	Martin Truex Jr.	Joe Gibbs Racing	Toyota	24	2
36	14	41	Cole Custer	Stewart-Haas Racing	Ford	24	1
37	11	4	Kevin Harvick	Stewart-Haas Racing	Ford	19	1
38	10	20	Christopher Bell	Joe Gibbs Racing	Toyota	18	1
39	18	23	Bubba Wallace	23XI Racing	Toyota	18	1
40	30	77	Justin Haley (i)	Spire Motorsports	Chevrolet	12	0
Official race results

=== Race statistics ===
- Lead changes: 11 among 10 different drivers
- Cautions/Laps: 6 for 41
- Red flags: 2 (1 for weather, 1 for 20 minutes and 54 seconds)
- Time of race: 3 hours, 7 minutes and 11 seconds
- Average speed: 59.024 miles per hour (94.990 km/h)

== Media ==
=== Television ===
Fox Sports covered the race on the television side. Mike Joy, Jeff Gordon and Clint Bowyer called the race from the broadcast booth. Jamie Little and Regan Smith handled pit road for the television side. Larry McReynolds provided insight from the Fox Sports studio in Charlotte.

FS1
Booth announcers	Pit reporters	In-race analyst
Lap-by-lap: Mike Joy; Color-commentator: Jeff Gordon; Color-commentator: Clint Bowyer	Jamie Little; Regan Smith	Larry McReynolds

=== Radio ===
PRN had the radio call for the race which was simulcasted on Sirius XM NASCAR Radio.

PRN
Booth announcers	Turn announcers	Pit reporters
Lead announcer: Doug Rice; Announcer: Mark Garrow	Turn 1: Rob Albright; Turns 2 to Becketts: Brett McMillan; Chapel to S do Senna: Doug Turnbull; To Sepang Hairpin: Ralph Sheheen; Motodrom: Pat Patterson; Istanbul 8 to Turn 20: Brad Gillie	Wendy Venturini; Alan Cavanna; Heather DeBeaux

== Standings after the race ==
Drivers' Championship standings

	Pos	Driver	Points
	1	Denny Hamlin	597
	2	William Byron	499 (–98)
2	3	Kyle Larson	487 (–110)
	4	Joey Logano	486 (–111)
2	5	Chase Elliott	481 (–116)
3	6	Martin Truex Jr.	474 (–123)
1	7	Ryan Blaney	458 (–139)
	8	Kevin Harvick	428 (–169)
	9	Brad Keselowski	422 (–175)
	10	Kyle Busch	422 (–175)
	11	Austin Dillon	366 (–231)
1	12	Alex Bowman	362 (–235)
1	13	Chris Buescher	338 (–259)
2	14	Christopher Bell	337 (–260)
	15	Tyler Reddick	334 (–263)
	16	Michael McDowell	329 (–268)
Official driver's standings

Manufacturers' Championship standings

Pos	Manufacturer	Points
1	Chevrolet	507
2	Ford	494 (–13)
3	Toyota	479 (–28)

- Note: Only the first 16 positions are included for the driver standings.
- . – Driver has clinched a position in the NASCAR Cup Series playoffs.

Previous race: 2021 Drydene 400	NASCAR Cup Series; 2021 season	Next race: 2021 Coca-Cola 600
