= 2022 Toyota Owners 400 =

NASCAR Cup Series race

Race details
- Race 7 of 36 in the 2022 NASCAR Cup Series
- The 2022 Toyota Owners 400 program cover.
- Date: April 3, 2022
- Location: Richmond Raceway in Richmond, Virginia
- Course: Permanent racing facility
- Course length: 0.75 miles (1.2 km)
- Distance: 400 laps, 300 mi (480 km)
- Average speed: 97.447 miles per hour (156.826 km/h)

Pole position
| Driver | Ryan Blaney | Team Penske |
- Time: 22.541

Most laps led
| Driver | Ryan Blaney | Team Penske |
- Laps: 129

Winner
| No. 11 | Denny Hamlin | Joe Gibbs Racing |

Television in the United States
- Network: Fox
- Announcers: Mike Joy, Clint Bowyer, and Chad Knaus
- Nielsen ratings: 2.3, 3.958 Million Viewers

Radio in the United States
- Radio: MRN
- Booth announcers: Alex Hayden, Jeff Striegle, and Todd Gordon
- Turn announcers: Dave Moody (Backstretch)

The 2022 Toyota Owners 400 was a NASCAR Cup Series race held on April 3, 2022, at Richmond Raceway in Richmond, Virginia. Contested over 400 laps on the 0.75 mile (1.2 km) asphalt short track, it was the seventh race of the 2022 NASCAR Cup Series season.

== Report ==
The layout of Richmond Raceway, the track where the race was held

=== Background ===
Richmond Raceway is a 3/4-mile (1.2 km), D-shaped, asphalt race track located just outside Richmond, Virginia in Henrico County. It hosts the NASCAR Cup Series and Xfinity Series. Known as "America's premier short track", it formerly hosted a NASCAR Camping World Truck Series race, an IndyCar Series race, and two USAC sprint car races.

==== Entry list ====
- (R) denotes rookie driver.
- (i) denotes driver who is ineligible for series driver points.

| No. | Driver | Team | Manufacturer |
|---|---|---|---|
| 1 | Ross Chastain | Trackhouse Racing Team | Chevrolet |
| 2 | Austin Cindric (R) | Team Penske | Ford |
| 3 | Austin Dillon | Richard Childress Racing | Chevrolet |
| 4 | Kevin Harvick | Stewart-Haas Racing | Ford |
| 5 | Kyle Larson | Hendrick Motorsports | Chevrolet |
| 6 | Brad Keselowski | RFK Racing | Ford |
| 7 | Corey LaJoie | Spire Motorsports | Chevrolet |
| 8 | Tyler Reddick | Richard Childress Racing | Chevrolet |
| 9 | Chase Elliott | Hendrick Motorsports | Chevrolet |
| 10 | Aric Almirola | Stewart-Haas Racing | Ford |
| 11 | Denny Hamlin | Joe Gibbs Racing | Toyota |
| 12 | Ryan Blaney | Team Penske | Ford |
| 14 | Chase Briscoe | Stewart-Haas Racing | Ford |
| 15 | J. J. Yeley (i) | Rick Ware Racing | Ford |
| 16 | A. J. Allmendinger (i) | Kaulig Racing | Chevrolet |
| 17 | Chris Buescher | RFK Racing | Ford |
| 18 | Kyle Busch | Joe Gibbs Racing | Toyota |
| 19 | Martin Truex Jr. | Joe Gibbs Racing | Toyota |
| 20 | Christopher Bell | Joe Gibbs Racing | Toyota |
| 21 | Harrison Burton (R) | Wood Brothers Racing | Ford |
| 22 | Joey Logano | Team Penske | Ford |
| 23 | Bubba Wallace | 23XI Racing | Toyota |
| 24 | William Byron | Hendrick Motorsports | Chevrolet |
| 31 | Justin Haley | Kaulig Racing | Chevrolet |
| 34 | Michael McDowell | Front Row Motorsports | Ford |
| 38 | Todd Gilliland (R) | Front Row Motorsports | Ford |
| 41 | Cole Custer | Stewart-Haas Racing | Ford |
| 42 | Ty Dillon | Petty GMS Motorsports | Chevrolet |
| 43 | Erik Jones | Petty GMS Motorsports | Chevrolet |
| 44 | Greg Biffle | NY Racing Team | Chevrolet |
| 45 | Kurt Busch | 23XI Racing | Toyota |
| 47 | Ricky Stenhouse Jr. | JTG Daugherty Racing | Chevrolet |
| 48 | Alex Bowman | Hendrick Motorsports | Chevrolet |
| 51 | Cody Ware | Rick Ware Racing | Ford |
| 77 | Landon Cassill (i) | Spire Motorsports | Chevrolet |
| 78 | B. J. McLeod | Live Fast Motorsports | Ford |
| 99 | Daniel Suárez | Trackhouse Racing Team | Chevrolet |
Official entry list

== Practice ==
Kyle Busch was the fastest in the practice session with a time of 22.558 seconds and a speed of 119.691 mph (192.624 km/h).

=== Practice results ===
| Pos | No. | Driver | Team | Manufacturer | Time | Speed |
|---|---|---|---|---|---|---|
| 1 | 18 | Kyle Busch | Joe Gibbs Racing | Toyota | 22.558 | 119.691 |
| 2 | 17 | Chris Buescher | RFK Racing | Ford | 22.628 | 119.321 |
| 3 | 12 | Ryan Blaney | Team Penske | Ford | 22.689 | 119.000 |
Official practice results

== Qualifying ==
Ryan Blaney scored the pole for the race with a time of 22.541 seconds and a speed of 119.782 mph (192.770 km/h).

=== Qualifying results ===
| Pos | No. | Driver | Team | Manufacturer | R1 | R2 |
|---|---|---|---|---|---|---|
| 1 | 12 | Ryan Blaney | Team Penske | Ford | 22.432 | 22.541 |
| 2 | 24 | William Byron | Hendrick Motorsports | Chevrolet | 22.557 | 22.578 |
| 3 | 18 | Kyle Busch | Joe Gibbs Racing | Toyota | 22.458 | 22.634 |
| 4 | 14 | Chase Briscoe | Stewart-Haas Racing | Ford | 22.473 | 22.658 |
| 5 | 43 | Erik Jones | Petty GMS Motorsports | Chevrolet | 22.442 | 22.747 |
| 6 | 19 | Martin Truex Jr. | Joe Gibbs Racing | Toyota | 22.460 | 22.761 |
| 7 | 4 | Kevin Harvick | Stewart-Haas Racing | Ford | 22.387 | 22.761 |
| 8 | 1 | Ross Chastain | Trackhouse Racing Team | Chevrolet | 22.359 | 22.767 |
| 9 | 20 | Christopher Bell | Joe Gibbs Racing | Toyota | 22.442 | 22.804 |
| 10 | 10 | Aric Almirola | Stewart-Haas Racing | Ford | 22.500 | 22.819 |
| 11 | 22 | Joey Logano | Team Penske | Ford | 22.516 | — |
| 12 | 41 | Cole Custer | Stewart-Haas Racing | Ford | 22.520 | — |
| 13 | 11 | Denny Hamlin | Joe Gibbs Racing | Toyota | 22.523 | — |
| 14 | 99 | Daniel Suárez | Trackhouse Racing Team | Chevrolet | 22.544 | — |
| 15 | 9 | Chase Elliott | Hendrick Motorsports | Chevrolet | 22.552 | — |
| 16 | 8 | Tyler Reddick | Richard Childress Racing | Chevrolet | 22.586 | — |
| 17 | 21 | Harrison Burton (R) | Wood Brothers Racing | Ford | 22.593 | — |
| 18 | 17 | Chris Buescher | RFK Racing | Ford | 22.600 | — |
| 19 | 6 | Brad Keselowski | RFK Racing | Ford | 22.606 | — |
| 20 | 2 | Austin Cindric (R) | Team Penske | Ford | 22.644 | — |
| 21 | 5 | Kyle Larson | Hendrick Motorsports | Chevrolet | 22.653 | — |
| 22 | 38 | Todd Gilliland (R) | Front Row Motorsports | Ford | 22.670 | — |
| 23 | 77 | Landon Cassill (i) | Spire Motorsports | Chevrolet | 22.725 | — |
| 24 | 34 | Michael McDowell | Front Row Motorsports | Ford | 22.739 | — |
| 25 | 3 | Austin Dillon | Richard Childress Racing | Chevrolet | 22.761 | — |
| 26 | 16 | A. J. Allmendinger (i) | Kaulig Racing | Chevrolet | 22.766 | — |
| 27 | 45 | Kurt Busch | 23XI Racing | Toyota | 22.807 | — |
| 28 | 48 | Alex Bowman | Hendrick Motorsports | Chevrolet | 22.818 | — |
| 29 | 23 | Bubba Wallace | 23XI Racing | Toyota | 22.828 | — |
| 30 | 42 | Ty Dillon | Petty GMS Motorsports | Chevrolet | 22.847 | — |
| 31 | 7 | Corey LaJoie | Spire Motorsports | Chevrolet | 22.971 | — |
| 32 | 47 | Ricky Stenhouse Jr. | JTG Daugherty Racing | Chevrolet | 22.982 | — |
| 33 | 51 | Cody Ware | Rick Ware Racing | Ford | 23.164 | — |
| 34 | 78 | B. J. McLeod | Live Fast Motorsports | Ford | 23.189 | — |
| 35 | 15 | J. J. Yeley (i) | Rick Ware Racing | Ford | 23.229 | — |
| 36 | 31 | Justin Haley | Kaulig Racing | Chevrolet | 0.000 | — |
| 37 | 44 | Greg Biffle | NY Racing Team | Chevrolet | 0.000 | — |
Official qualifying results

== Race ==
=== Stage Results ===
Stage One Laps: 70

| Pos | No | Driver | Team | Manufacturer | Points |
|---|---|---|---|---|---|
| 1 | 12 | Ryan Blaney | Team Penske | Ford | 10 |
| 2 | 24 | William Byron | Hendrick Motorsports | Chevrolet | 9 |
| 3 | 1 | Ross Chastain | Trackhouse Racing Team | Chevrolet | 8 |
| 4 | 19 | Martin Truex Jr. | Joe Gibbs Racing | Toyota | 7 |
| 5 | 18 | Kyle Busch | Joe Gibbs Racing | Toyota | 6 |
| 6 | 9 | Chase Elliott | Hendrick Motorsports | Chevrolet | 5 |
| 7 | 20 | Christopher Bell | Joe Gibbs Racing | Toyota | 4 |
| 8 | 22 | Joey Logano | Team Penske | Ford | 3 |
| 9 | 6 | Brad Keselowski | RFK Racing | Ford | 2 |
| 10 | 4 | Kevin Harvick | Stewart-Haas Racing | Ford | 1 |
Official stage one results

Stage Two Laps: 160

| Pos | No | Driver | Team | Manufacturer | Points |
|---|---|---|---|---|---|
| 1 | 19 | Martin Truex Jr. | Joe Gibbs Racing | Toyota | 10 |
| 2 | 20 | Christopher Bell | Joe Gibbs Racing | Toyota | 9 |
| 3 | 1 | Ross Chastain | Trackhouse Racing Team | Chevrolet | 8 |
| 4 | 22 | Joey Logano | Team Penske | Ford | 7 |
| 5 | 12 | Ryan Blaney | Team Penske | Ford | 6 |
| 6 | 9 | Chase Elliott | Hendrick Motorsports | Chevrolet | 5 |
| 7 | 4 | Kevin Harvick | Stewart-Haas Racing | Ford | 4 |
| 8 | 18 | Kyle Busch | Joe Gibbs Racing | Toyota | 3 |
| 9 | 5 | Kyle Larson | Hendrick Motorsports | Chevrolet | 2 |
| 10 | 6 | Brad Keselowski | RFK Racing | Ford | 1 |
Official stage two results

=== Final Stage Results ===
Stage Three Laps: 170

| Pos | Grid | No | Driver | Team | Manufacturer | Laps | Points |
|---|---|---|---|---|---|---|---|
| 1 | 13 | 11 | Denny Hamlin | Joe Gibbs Racing | Toyota | 400 | 40 |
| 2 | 7 | 4 | Kevin Harvick | Stewart-Haas Racing | Ford | 400 | 40 |
| 3 | 2 | 24 | William Byron | Hendrick Motorsports | Chevrolet | 400 | 43 |
| 4 | 6 | 19 | Martin Truex Jr. | Joe Gibbs Racing | Toyota | 400 | 50 |
| 5 | 21 | 5 | Kyle Larson | Hendrick Motorsports | Chevrolet | 400 | 34 |
| 6 | 9 | 20 | Christopher Bell | Joe Gibbs Racing | Toyota | 400 | 44 |
| 7 | 1 | 12 | Ryan Blaney | Team Penske | Ford | 400 | 46 |
| 8 | 28 | 48 | Alex Bowman | Hendrick Motorsports | Chevrolet | 400 | 29 |
| 9 | 3 | 18 | Kyle Busch | Joe Gibbs Racing | Toyota | 400 | 37 |
| 10 | 25 | 3 | Austin Dillon | Richard Childress Racing | Chevrolet | 400 | 27 |
| 11 | 4 | 14 | Chase Briscoe | Stewart-Haas Racing | Ford | 400 | 26 |
| 12 | 16 | 8 | Tyler Reddick | Richard Childress Racing | Chevrolet | 400 | 25 |
| 13 | 19 | 6 | Brad Keselowski | RFK Racing | Ford | 400 | 27 |
| 14 | 15 | 9 | Chase Elliott | Hendrick Motorsports | Chevrolet | 400 | 33 |
| 15 | 18 | 17 | Chris Buescher | RFK Racing | Ford | 400 | 22 |
| 16 | 14 | 99 | Daniel Suárez | Trackhouse Racing Team | Chevrolet | 400 | 21 |
| 17 | 11 | 22 | Joey Logano | Team Penske | Ford | 399 | 30 |
| 18 | 17 | 21 | Harrison Burton (R) | Wood Brothers Racing | Ford | 399 | 19 |
| 19 | 8 | 1 | Ross Chastain | Trackhouse Racing Team | Chevrolet | 399 | 34 |
| 20 | 20 | 2 | Austin Cindric (R) | Team Penske | Ford | 399 | 17 |
| 21 | 10 | 10 | Aric Almirola | Stewart-Haas Racing | Ford | 398 | 16 |
| 22 | 12 | 41 | Cole Custer | Stewart-Haas Racing | Ford | 398 | 15 |
| 23 | 5 | 43 | Erik Jones | Petty GMS Motorsports | Chevrolet | 398 | 14 |
| 24 | 30 | 42 | Ty Dillon | Petty GMS Motorsports | Chevrolet | 398 | 13 |
| 25 | 22 | 38 | Todd Gilliland (R) | Front Row Motorsports | Ford | 397 | 12 |
| 26 | 29 | 23 | Bubba Wallace | 23XI Racing | Toyota | 397 | 11 |
| 27 | 26 | 16 | A. J. Allmendinger (i) | Kaulig Racing | Chevrolet | 396 | 0 |
| 28 | 32 | 47 | Ricky Stenhouse Jr. | JTG Daugherty Racing | Chevrolet | 396 | 9 |
| 29 | 36 | 31 | Justin Haley | Kaulig Racing | Chevrolet | 396 | 8 |
| 30 | 24 | 34 | Michael McDowell | Front Row Motorsports | Ford | 395 | 7 |
| 31 | 31 | 7 | Corey LaJoie | Spire Motorsports | Chevrolet | 392 | 6 |
| 32 | 23 | 77 | Landon Cassill (i) | Spire Motorsports | Chevrolet | 390 | 0 |
| 33 | 35 | 15 | J. J. Yeley (i) | Rick Ware Racing | Ford | 390 | 0 |
| 34 | 34 | 78 | B. J. McLeod | Live Fast Motorsports | Ford | 386 | 3 |
| 35 | 27 | 45 | Kurt Busch | 23XI Racing | Toyota | 291 | 2 |
| 36 | 33 | 51 | Cody Ware | Rick Ware Racing | Ford | 247 | 1 |
| 37 | 37 | 44 | Greg Biffle | NY Racing Team | Chevrolet | 96 | 1 |
Official race results

=== Race statistics ===
- Lead changes: 13 among 7 different drivers
- Cautions/Laps: 5 for 35
- Red flags: 0
- Time of race: 3 hours, 4 minutes and 43 seconds
- Average speed: 97.447 miles per hour (156.826 km/h)

== Media ==
=== Television ===
Fox Sports covered their 21st race at the Richmond Raceway. Mike Joy, two-time Richmond winner Clint Bowyer and seven-time NASCAR Cup Series winning crew chief Chad Knaus called the race from the broadcast booth. Jamie Little and Regan Smith handled pit road for the television side. Larry McReynolds and Jamie McMurray provided insight from the Fox Sports studio in Charlotte.

Fox
| Booth announcers | Pit reporters | In-race analysts |
|---|---|---|
| Lap-by-lap: Mike Joy; Color-commentator: Clint Bowyer; Color-commentator: Chad Knaus | Jamie Little; Regan Smith | Larry McReynolds; Jamie McMurray |

=== Radio ===
MRN had the radio call for the race which was simulcasted on Sirius XM NASCAR Radio. Alex Hayden, Jeff Striegle and former crew chief Todd Gordon called the race in the booth when the field raced down the frontstretch. Mike Bagley called the race from a platform inside the backstretch when the field raced down the backstretch. Steve Post and Kim Coon handled pit road for the radio side.

MRN
| Booth announcers | Turn announcers | Pit reporters |
|---|---|---|
| Lead announcer: Alex Hayden; Announcer: Jeff Striegle; Announcer: Todd Gordon | Backstretch: Mike Bagley | Steve Post; Kim Coon |

== Standings after the race ==
Drivers' Championship standings

| | Pos | Driver | Points |
|---|---|---|---|
| 1 | 1 | Ryan Blaney | 241 |
| 1 | 2 | Chase Elliott | 241 (–0) |
| 4 | 3 | Martin Truex Jr. | 222 (–19) |
| 2 | 4 | William Byron | 218 (–23) |
| 2 | 5 | Joey Logano | 215 (–26) |
| 1 | 6 | Ross Chastain | 214 (–27) |
| 3 | 7 | Alex Bowman | 212 (–29) |
| 6 | 8 | Kevin Harvick | 193 (–48) |
| | 9 | Chase Briscoe | 192 (–49) |
| 1 | 10 | Kyle Busch | 191 (–50) |
| 3 | 11 | Aric Almirola | 184 (–57) |
| 4 | 12 | Kyle Larson | 183 (–58) |
| 3 | 13 | Tyler Reddick | 183 (–58) |
| 1 | 14 | Daniel Suárez | 171 (–70) |
| 3 | 15 | Austin Cindric | 170 (–71) |
| 2 | 16 | Austin Dillon | 158 (–83) |
Official driver's standings

Manufacturers' Championship standings

| Pos | Manufacturer | Points |
|---|---|---|
| 1 | Chevrolet | 256 |
| 2 | Ford | 239 (–17) |
| 3 | Toyota | 237 (–19) |

- Note: Only the first 16 positions are included for the driver standings.
- . – Driver has clinched a position in the NASCAR Cup Series playoffs.

| Previous race: 2022 Texas Grand Prix | NASCAR Cup Series; 2022 season | Next race: 2022 Blue-Emu Maximum Pain Relief 400 |
