= 2022 Ally 400 =

NASCAR Cup Series race

Race details
- Race 17 of 36 in the 2022 NASCAR Cup Series
- Date: June 26, 2022
- Location: Nashville Superspeedway in Lebanon, Tennessee
- Course: Permanent racing facility
- Course length: 1.333 miles (2.145 km)
- Distance: 300 laps, 400 mi (640 km)
- Average speed: 111.22 miles per hour (178.99 km/h)

Pole position
Driver	Denny Hamlin	Joe Gibbs Racing
- Time: 29.848

Most laps led
Driver	Denny Hamlin	Joe Gibbs Racing
- Laps: 114

Winner
No. 9	Chase Elliott	Hendrick Motorsports

Television in the United States
- Network: NBC / USA
- Announcers: Rick Allen, Jeff Burton, Steve Letarte, and Dale Earnhardt Jr.
- Nielsen ratings: 1.81 (2.921 million)

Radio in the United States
- Radio: MRN
- Booth announcers: Alex Hayden and Jeff Striegle
- Turn announcers: Dave Moody (1–2) and Kyle Rickey (3–4)

The 2022 Ally 400 was a NASCAR Cup Series race held on June 26, 2022, at Nashville Superspeedway in Lebanon, Tennessee. Contested over 300 laps on the 1 1/3-mile (2.146 km) superspeedway, it was the 17th race of the 2022 NASCAR Cup Series season.

== Report ==
=== Background ===
Nashville Superspeedway is a motor racing complex located in Gladeville, Tennessee (though the track has a Lebanon address), United States, about 30 miles (48 km) southeast of Nashville. The track was built in 2001 and is currently used for events, driving schools and GT Academy, a reality television competition.

It is a concrete oval track 1 1/3 miles (2.146 km) long. Nashville Superspeedway is owned by Dover Motorsports, Inc., which also owns Dover International Speedway. Nashville Superspeedway was the longest concrete oval in NASCAR during the time it was on the NASCAR Xfinity Series and NASCAR Camping World Truck Series circuits. Current permanent seating capacity is approximately 25,000. Additional portable seats are brought in for some events, and seating capacity can be expanded to 150,000. Infrastructure is in place to expand the facility to include a short track, drag strip, and road course.

==== Entry list ====
- (R) denotes rookie driver.
- (i) denotes driver who is ineligible for series driver points.

No.	Driver	Team	Manufacturer
1	Ross Chastain	Trackhouse Racing Team	Chevrolet
2	Austin Cindric (R)	Team Penske	Ford
3	Austin Dillon	Richard Childress Racing	Chevrolet
4	Kevin Harvick	Stewart-Haas Racing	Ford
5	Kyle Larson	Hendrick Motorsports	Chevrolet
6	Brad Keselowski	RFK Racing	Ford
7	Corey LaJoie	Spire Motorsports	Chevrolet
8	Tyler Reddick	Richard Childress Racing	Chevrolet
9	Chase Elliott	Hendrick Motorsports	Chevrolet
10	Aric Almirola	Stewart-Haas Racing	Ford
11	Denny Hamlin	Joe Gibbs Racing	Toyota
12	Ryan Blaney	Team Penske	Ford
14	Chase Briscoe	Stewart-Haas Racing	Ford
15	J. J. Yeley (i)	Rick Ware Racing	Ford
16	A. J. Allmendinger (i)	Kaulig Racing	Chevrolet
17	Chris Buescher	RFK Racing	Ford
18	Kyle Busch	Joe Gibbs Racing	Toyota
19	Martin Truex Jr.	Joe Gibbs Racing	Toyota
20	Christopher Bell	Joe Gibbs Racing	Toyota
21	Harrison Burton (R)	Wood Brothers Racing	Ford
22	Joey Logano	Team Penske	Ford
23	Bubba Wallace	23XI Racing	Toyota
24	William Byron	Hendrick Motorsports	Chevrolet
31	Justin Haley	Kaulig Racing	Chevrolet
34	Michael McDowell	Front Row Motorsports	Ford
38	Todd Gilliland (R)	Front Row Motorsports	Ford
41	Cole Custer	Stewart-Haas Racing	Ford
42	Ty Dillon	Petty GMS Motorsports	Chevrolet
43	Erik Jones	Petty GMS Motorsports	Chevrolet
45	Kurt Busch	23XI Racing	Toyota
47	Ricky Stenhouse Jr.	JTG Daugherty Racing	Chevrolet
48	Alex Bowman	Hendrick Motorsports	Chevrolet
51	Cody Ware	Rick Ware Racing	Ford
77	Josh Bilicki (i)	Spire Motorsports	Chevrolet
78	B. J. McLeod (i)	Live Fast Motorsports	Ford
99	Daniel Suárez	Trackhouse Racing Team	Chevrolet
Official entry list

== Practice ==
Bubba Wallace was the fastest in the practice session with a time of 29.609 seconds and a speed of 161.708 mph (260.244 km/h).

=== Practice results ===
Pos	No.	Driver	Team	Manufacturer	Time	Speed
1	23	Bubba Wallace	23XI Racing	Toyota	29.609	161.708
2	18	Kyle Busch	Joe Gibbs Racing	Toyota	29.751	160.936
3	8	Tyler Reddick	Richard Childress Racing	Chevrolet	29.840	160.936
Official practice results

== Qualifying ==
Denny Hamlin scored the pole for the race with a time of 29.848 seconds and a speed of 160.413 mph (258.160 km/h). The final round of qualifying was cancelled due to rain.

=== Qualifying results ===
Pos	No.	Driver	Team	Manufacturer	R1	R2
1	11	Denny Hamlin	Joe Gibbs Racing	Toyota	29.848	—
2	22	Joey Logano	Team Penske	Ford	29.905	—
3	5	Kyle Larson	Hendrick Motorsports	Chevrolet	29.932	—
4	9	Chase Elliott	Hendrick Motorsports	Chevrolet	29.938	—
5	99	Daniel Suárez	Trackhouse Racing Team	Chevrolet	29.948	—
6	12	Ryan Blaney	Team Penske	Ford	29.950	—
7	1	Ross Chastain	Trackhouse Racing Team	Chevrolet	29.977	—
8	4	Kevin Harvick	Stewart-Haas Racing	Ford	29.989	—
9	20	Christopher Bell	Joe Gibbs Racing	Toyota	30.070	—
10	19	Martin Truex Jr.	Joe Gibbs Racing	Toyota	30.074	—
11	10	Aric Almirola	Stewart-Haas Racing	Ford	29.999	—
12	48	Alex Bowman	Hendrick Motorsports	Chevrolet	30.015	—
13	24	William Byron	Hendrick Motorsports	Chevrolet	30.021	—
14	16	A. J. Allmendinger (i)	Kaulig Racing	Chevrolet	30.108	—
15	17	Chris Buescher	RFK Racing	Ford	30.120	—
16	8	Tyler Reddick	Richard Childress Racing	Chevrolet	30.136	—
17	41	Cole Custer	Stewart-Haas Racing	Ford	30.140	—
18	34	Michael McDowell	Front Row Motorsports	Ford	30.142	—
19	45	Kurt Busch	23XI Racing	Toyota	30.143	—
20	3	Austin Dillon	Richard Childress Racing	Chevrolet	30.152	—
21	31	Justin Haley	Kaulig Racing	Chevrolet	30.253	—
22	7	Corey LaJoie	Spire Motorsports	Chevrolet	30.288	—
23	43	Erik Jones	Petty GMS Motorsports	Chevrolet	30.326	—
24	2	Austin Cindric (R)	Team Penske	Ford	30.360	—
25	47	Ricky Stenhouse Jr.	JTG Daugherty Racing	Chevrolet	30.407	—
26	21	Harrison Burton (R)	Wood Brothers Racing	Ford	30.471	—
27	6	Brad Keselowski	RFK Racing	Ford	30.472	—
28	14	Chase Briscoe	Stewart-Haas Racing	Ford	30.475	—
29	42	Ty Dillon	Petty GMS Motorsports	Chevrolet	30.641	—
30	23	Bubba Wallace	23XI Racing	Toyota	30.688	—
31	51	Cody Ware	Rick Ware Racing	Ford	30.863	—
32	15	J. J. Yeley (i)	Rick Ware Racing	Ford	30.876	—
33	38	Todd Gilliland (R)	Front Row Motorsports	Ford	30.952	—
34	77	Josh Bilicki (i)	Spire Motorsports	Chevrolet	31.091	—
35	78	B. J. McLeod (i)	Live Fast Motorsports	Chevrolet	31.985	—
36	18	Kyle Busch	Joe Gibbs Racing	Toyota	0.000	—
Official qualifying results

== Race ==
=== Stage Results ===
Stage One Laps: 90

Pos	No	Driver	Team	Manufacturer	Points
1	19	Martin Truex Jr.	Joe Gibbs Racing	Toyota	10
2	11	Denny Hamlin	Joe Gibbs Racing	Toyota	9
3	12	Ryan Blaney	Team Penske	Ford	8
4	20	Christopher Bell	Joe Gibbs Racing	Toyota	7
5	4	Kevin Harvick	Stewart-Haas Racing	Ford	6
6	5	Kyle Larson	Hendrick Motorsports	Chevrolet	5
7	23	Bubba Wallace	23XI Racing	Toyota	4
8	9	Chase Elliott	Hendrick Motorsports	Chevrolet	3
9	18	Kyle Busch	Joe Gibbs Racing	Toyota	2
10	45	Kurt Busch	23XI Racing	Toyota	1
Official stage one results

Stage Two Laps: 95

Pos	No	Driver	Team	Manufacturer	Points
1	19	Martin Truex Jr.	Joe Gibbs Racing	Toyota	10
2	11	Denny Hamlin	Joe Gibbs Racing	Toyota	9
3	18	Kyle Busch	Joe Gibbs Racing	Toyota	8
4	9	Chase Elliott	Hendrick Motorsports	Chevrolet	7
5	45	Kurt Busch	23XI Racing	Toyota	6
6	5	Kyle Larson	Hendrick Motorsports	Chevrolet	5
7	1	Ross Chastain	Trackhouse Racing Team	Chevrolet	4
8	4	Kevin Harvick	Stewart-Haas Racing	Ford	3
9	12	Ryan Blaney	Team Penske	Ford	2
10	34	Michael McDowell	Front Row Motorsports	Ford	1
Official stage two results

=== Final Stage Results ===
Stage Three Laps: 115

Pos	Grid	No	Driver	Team	Manufacturer	Laps	Points
1	4	9	Chase Elliott	Hendrick Motorsports	Chevrolet	300	50
2	19	45	Kurt Busch	23XI Racing	Toyota	300	42
3	6	12	Ryan Blaney	Team Penske	Ford	300	44
4	3	5	Kyle Larson	Hendrick Motorsports	Chevrolet	300	43
5	7	1	Ross Chastain	Trackhouse Racing Team	Chevrolet	300	36
6	1	11	Denny Hamlin	Joe Gibbs Racing	Toyota	300	49
7	24	2	Austin Cindric (R)	Team Penske	Ford	300	30
8	9	20	Christopher Bell	Joe Gibbs Racing	Toyota	300	36
9	2	22	Joey Logano	Team Penske	Ford	300	28
10	8	4	Kevin Harvick	Stewart-Haas Racing	Ford	300	36
11	23	43	Erik Jones	Petty GMS Motorsports	Chevrolet	300	26
12	30	23	Bubba Wallace	23XI Racing	Toyota	300	29
13	18	34	Michael McDowell	Front Row Motorsports	Ford	300	25
14	20	3	Austin Dillon	Richard Childress Racing	Chevrolet	300	23
15	5	99	Daniel Suárez	Trackhouse Racing Team	Chevrolet	300	22
16	25	47	Ricky Stenhouse Jr.	JTG Daugherty Racing	Chevrolet	300	21
17	11	10	Aric Almirola	Stewart-Haas Racing	Ford	300	20
18	16	8	Tyler Reddick	Richard Childress Racing	Chevrolet	300	19
19	14	16	A. J. Allmendinger (i)	Kaulig Racing	Chevrolet	300	0
20	22	7	Corey LaJoie	Spire Motorsports	Chevrolet	300	17
21	36	18	Kyle Busch	Joe Gibbs Racing	Toyota	300	26
22	10	19	Martin Truex Jr.	Joe Gibbs Racing	Toyota	300	35
23	21	31	Justin Haley	Kaulig Racing	Chevrolet	300	14
24	33	38	Todd Gilliland (R)	Front Row Motorsports	Ford	300	13
25	26	21	Harrison Burton (R)	Wood Brothers Racing	Ford	300	12
26	17	41	Cole Custer	Stewart-Haas Racing	Ford	300	11
27	31	51	Cody Ware	Rick Ware Racing	Ford	298	10
28	32	15	J. J. Yeley (i)	Rick Ware Racing	Ford	298	0
29	27	6	Brad Keselowski	RFK Racing	Ford	298	8
30	15	17	Chris Buescher	RFK Racing	Ford	297	7
31	29	42	Ty Dillon	Petty GMS Motorsports	Chevrolet	297	6
32	35	78	B. J. McLeod (i)	Live Fast Motorsports	Ford	295	0
33	34	77	Josh Bilicki (i)	Spire Motorsports	Chevrolet	285	0
34	28	14	Chase Briscoe	Stewart-Haas Racing	Ford	269	3
35	13	24	William Byron	Hendrick Motorsports	Chevrolet	262	2
36	12	48	Alex Bowman	Hendrick Motorsports	Chevrolet	49	1
Official race results

=== Race statistics ===
- Lead changes: 18 among 7 different drivers
- Cautions/Laps: 10 for 57
- Red flags: 2 for weather
- Time of race: 3 hours, 35 minutes and 15 seconds
- Average speed: 111.22 miles per hour (178.99 km/h)

== Media ==
=== Television ===
NBC Sports covered the race on the television side. Although NBC was scheduled to air the race, the numerous lightning delays, which caused the race to run past NBC's window, necessitated that the race's conclusion be moved to USA Network. Rick Allen, Jeff Burton, Steve Letarte, and Dale Earnhardt Jr. called the race from the broadcast booth. Dave Burns, Parker Kligerman and Marty Snider handled the pit road duties from pit lane. Rutledge Wood served as a “CityView” reporter and shared stories from Nashville's famous Tootsie's Orchid Lounge.

NBC / USA
Booth announcers	Pit reporters	Cityview reporter
Lap-by-lap: Rick Allen; Color-commentator: Jeff Burton; Color-commentator: Steve Letarte; Color-commentator: Dale Earnhardt Jr.	Dave Burns; Parker Kligerman; Marty Snider	Rutledge Wood

=== Radio ===
Radio coverage of the race was broadcast by Motor Racing Network (MRN) and simulcast on Sirius XM NASCAR Radio. This would be the final Nashville race covered by MRN Radio, radio rights shifted to PRN for 2023 onwards.

MRN
Booth announcers	Turn announcers	Pit reporters
Lead announcer: Alex Hayden; Announcer: Jeff Striegle	Turns 1 & 2: Dave Moody; Turns 3 & 4: Mike Bagley	Winston Kelley; Jason Toy; Brienne Pedigo; Kim Coon

== Standings after the race ==
Drivers' Championship standings

	Pos	Driver	Points
	1	Chase Elliott	586
	2	Ross Chastain	556 (–30)
1	3	Ryan Blaney	555 (–31)
1	4	Kyle Busch	539 (–47)
	5	Joey Logano	534 (–52)
1	6	Kyle Larson	519 (–67)
1	7	Martin Truex Jr.	516 (–70)
2	8	Christopher Bell	480 (–106)
1	9	William Byron	468 (–118)
1	10	Alex Bowman	461 (–125)
1	11	Kevin Harvick	452 (–134)
1	12	Aric Almirola	443 (–143)
1	13	Tyler Reddick	400 (–186)
1	14	Austin Dillon	399 (–187)
4	15	Kurt Busch	397 (–189)
	16	Erik Jones	394 (–192)
Official driver's standings

Manufacturers' Championship standings

Pos	Manufacturer	Points
1	Chevrolet	622
2	Ford	575 (–47)
3	Toyota	575 (–47)

- Note: Only the first 16 positions are included for the driver standings.
- . – Driver has clinched a position in the NASCAR Cup Series playoffs.

Previous race: 2022 Toyota/Save Mart 350	NASCAR Cup Series; 2022 season	Next race: 2022 Kwik Trip 250
