= 2021 Coca-Cola 600 =

NASCAR Cup Series race

Race details
- Race 15 of 36 in the 2021 NASCAR Cup Series
- Date: May 30, 2021
- Location: Charlotte Motor Speedway in Concord, North Carolina
- Course: Permanent racing facility
- Course length: 1.5 miles (2.4 km)
- Distance: 400 laps, 600 mi (965.6 km)
- Average speed: 150.785 miles per hour (242.665 km/h)

Pole position
Driver	Kyle Larson	Hendrick Motorsports
- Time: 29.953

Most laps led
Driver	Kyle Larson	Hendrick Motorsports
- Laps: 328

Winner
No. 5	Kyle Larson	Hendrick Motorsports

Television in the United States
- Network: FOX
- Announcers: Mike Joy, Jeff Gordon and Clint Bowyer

Radio in the United States
- Radio: PRN
- Booth announcers: Doug Rice and Mark Garrow
- Turn announcers: Rob Albright (1 & 2) and Pat Patterson (3 & 4)

The 2021 Coca-Cola 600, the 62nd running of the event, was a NASCAR Cup Series race held at Charlotte Motor Speedway in Concord, North Carolina. Contested over 400 laps on the 1.5 mile (2.42 km) asphalt speedway, it was the 15th race of the 2021 NASCAR Cup Series season, as well as the third of the four crown jewel races.

== Report ==
=== Background ===
Charlotte Motor Speedway, the track where the race was held.

The race was held at Charlotte Motor Speedway, located in Concord, North Carolina. The speedway complex includes a 1.5-mile (2.4 km) quad-oval track that was utilized for the race, as well as a dragstrip and a dirt track. The speedway was built in 1959 by Bruton Smith and is considered the home track for NASCAR with many race teams based in the Charlotte metropolitan area. The track is owned and operated by Speedway Motorsports Inc. (SMI) with Marcus G. Smith serving as track president.

Similar to the Daytona 500, which was a four-stage race (with the first stage being the qualifying heat race), the Coca-Cola 600 is a four-stage race, with this the only race where all four stages are in the main race itself. All four stages are scheduled to consist of 100 laps. The race is official after the second stage.

==== Entry list ====
- (R) denotes rookie driver.
- (i) denotes driver who are ineligible for series driver points.

No.	Driver	Team	Manufacturer
00	Quin Houff	StarCom Racing	Chevrolet
1	Kurt Busch	Chip Ganassi Racing	Chevrolet
2	Brad Keselowski	Team Penske	Ford
3	Austin Dillon	Richard Childress Racing	Chevrolet
4	Kevin Harvick	Stewart-Haas Racing	Ford
5	Kyle Larson	Hendrick Motorsports	Chevrolet
6	Ryan Newman	Roush Fenway Racing	Ford
7	Corey LaJoie	Spire Motorsports	Chevrolet
8	Tyler Reddick	Richard Childress Racing	Chevrolet
9	Chase Elliott	Hendrick Motorsports	Chevrolet
10	Aric Almirola	Stewart-Haas Racing	Ford
11	Denny Hamlin	Joe Gibbs Racing	Toyota
12	Ryan Blaney	Team Penske	Ford
14	Chase Briscoe (R)	Stewart-Haas Racing	Ford
15	James Davison	Rick Ware Racing	Chevrolet
17	Chris Buescher	Roush Fenway Racing	Ford
18	Kyle Busch	Joe Gibbs Racing	Toyota
19	Martin Truex Jr.	Joe Gibbs Racing	Toyota
20	Christopher Bell	Joe Gibbs Racing	Toyota
21	Matt DiBenedetto	Wood Brothers Racing	Ford
22	Joey Logano	Team Penske	Ford
23	Bubba Wallace	23XI Racing	Toyota
24	William Byron	Hendrick Motorsports	Chevrolet
34	Michael McDowell	Front Row Motorsports	Ford
37	Ryan Preece	JTG Daugherty Racing	Chevrolet
38	Anthony Alfredo (R)	Front Row Motorsports	Ford
41	Cole Custer	Stewart-Haas Racing	Ford
42	Ross Chastain	Chip Ganassi Racing	Chevrolet
43	Erik Jones	Richard Petty Motorsports	Chevrolet
47	Ricky Stenhouse Jr.	JTG Daugherty Racing	Chevrolet
48	Alex Bowman	Hendrick Motorsports	Chevrolet
51	Garrett Smithley (i)	Petty Ware Racing	Chevrolet
52	Josh Bilicki	Rick Ware Racing	Ford
53	Cody Ware (i)	Rick Ware Racing	Chevrolet
66	David Starr (i)	MBM Motorsports	Toyota
77	Justin Haley (i)	Spire Motorsports	Chevrolet
78	B. J. McLeod (i)	Live Fast Motorsports	Ford
99	Daniel Suárez	Trackhouse Racing Team	Chevrolet
Official entry list

== Practice ==
Austin Dillon was the fastest in the practice session with a time of 29.845 seconds and a speed of 180.935 mph (291.187 km/h).

=== Practice results ===
Pos	No.	Driver	Team	Manufacturer	Time	Speed
1	3	Austin Dillon	Richard Childress Racing	Chevrolet	29.845	180.935
2	48	Alex Bowman	Hendrick Motorsports	Chevrolet	29.861	180.838
3	5	Kyle Larson	Hendrick Motorsports	Chevrolet	29.866	180.838
Official practice results

== Qualifying ==
Kyle Larson scored the pole for the race with a time of 29.953 and a speed of 180.282 mph (290.136 km/h).

=== Qualifying results ===
Pos	No.	Driver	Team	Manufacturer	Time
1	5	Kyle Larson	Hendrick Motorsports	Chevrolet	29.953
2	47	Ricky Stenhouse Jr.	JTG Daugherty Racing	Chevrolet	29.960
3	9	Chase Elliott	Hendrick Motorsports	Chevrolet	29.969
4	24	William Byron	Hendrick Motorsports	Chevrolet	29.970
5	4	Kevin Harvick	Stewart-Haas Racing	Ford	29.993
6	3	Austin Dillon	Richard Childress Racing	Chevrolet	30.029
7	48	Alex Bowman	Hendrick Motorsports	Chevrolet	30.045
8	19	Martin Truex Jr.	Joe Gibbs Racing	Toyota	30.064
9	99	Daniel Suárez	Trackhouse Racing Team	Chevrolet	30.069
10	42	Ross Chastain	Chip Ganassi Racing	Chevrolet	30.072
11	12	Ryan Blaney	Team Penske	Ford	30.090
12	1	Kurt Busch	Chip Ganassi Racing	Chevrolet	30.090
13	2	Brad Keselowski	Team Penske	Ford	30.111
14	11	Denny Hamlin	Joe Gibbs Racing	Toyota	30.112
15	8	Tyler Reddick	Richard Childress Racing	Chevrolet	30.143
16	22	Joey Logano	Team Penske	Ford	30.146
17	20	Christopher Bell	Joe Gibbs Racing	Toyota	30.159
18	23	Bubba Wallace	23XI Racing	Toyota	30.207
19	43	Erik Jones	Richard Petty Motorsports	Chevrolet	30.231
20	18	Kyle Busch	Joe Gibbs Racing	Toyota	30.241
21	14	Chase Briscoe (R)	Stewart-Haas Racing	Ford	30.270
22	21	Matt DiBenedetto	Wood Brothers Racing	Ford	30.274
23	41	Cole Custer	Stewart-Haas Racing	Ford	30.298
24	34	Michael McDowell	Front Row Motorsports	Ford	30.323
25	6	Ryan Newman	Roush Fenway Racing	Ford	30.325
26	7	Corey LaJoie	Spire Motorsports	Chevrolet	30.330
27	17	Chris Buescher	Roush Fenway Racing	Ford	30.336
28	37	Ryan Preece	JTG Daugherty Racing	Chevrolet	30.402
29	38	Anthony Alfredo (R)	Front Row Motorsports	Ford	30.415
30	77	Justin Haley (i)	Spire Motorsports	Chevrolet	30.708
31	10	Aric Almirola	Stewart-Haas Racing	Ford	30.834
32	00	Quin Houff	StarCom Racing	Chevrolet	30.939
33	78	B. J. McLeod (i)	Live Fast Motorsports	Ford	30.952
34	53	Cody Ware (i)	Rick Ware Racing	Chevrolet	30.971
35	15	James Davison	Rick Ware Racing	Chevrolet	31.493
36	51	Garrett Smithley (i)	Petty Ware Racing	Chevrolet	31.499
37	52	Josh Bilicki	Rick Ware Racing	Ford	31.569
38	66	David Starr	MBM Motorsports	Toyota	33.071
Official qualifying results

== Race ==
=== Stage Results ===
Stage One Laps: 100

Pos	No	Driver	Team	Manufacturer	Points
1	5	Kyle Larson	Hendrick Motorsports	Chevrolet	10
2	9	Chase Elliott	Hendrick Motorsports	Chevrolet	9
3	24	William Byron	Hendrick Motorsports	Chevrolet	8
4	4	Kevin Harvick	Stewart-Haas Racing	Ford	7
5	3	Austin Dillon	Richard Childress Racing	Chevrolet	6
6	18	Kyle Busch	Joe Gibbs Racing	Toyota	5
7	19	Martin Truex Jr.	Joe Gibbs Racing	Toyota	4
8	8	Tyler Reddick	Richard Childress Racing	Chevrolet	3
9	47	Ricky Stenhouse Jr.	JTG Daugherty Racing	Chevrolet	2
10	48	Alex Bowman	Hendrick Motorsports	Chevrolet	1
Official stage one results

Stage Two Laps: 100

Pos	No	Driver	Team	Manufacturer	Points
1	5	Kyle Larson	Hendrick Motorsports	Chevrolet	10
2	9	Chase Elliott	Hendrick Motorsports	Chevrolet	9
3	24	William Byron	Hendrick Motorsports	Chevrolet	8
4	18	Kyle Busch	Joe Gibbs Racing	Toyota	7
5	8	Tyler Reddick	Richard Childress Racing	Chevrolet	6
6	4	Kevin Harvick	Stewart-Haas Racing	Ford	5
7	48	Alex Bowman	Hendrick Motorsports	Chevrolet	4
8	17	Chris Buescher	Roush Fenway Racing	Ford	3
9	11	Denny Hamlin	Joe Gibbs Racing	Toyota	2
10	3	Austin Dillon	Richard Childress Racing	Chevrolet	1
Official stage two results

Stage Three Laps: 100

Pos	No	Driver	Team	Manufacturer	Points
1	5	Kyle Larson	Hendrick Motorsports	Chevrolet	10
2	24	William Byron	Hendrick Motorsports	Chevrolet	9
3	18	Kyle Busch	Joe Gibbs Racing	Toyota	8
4	9	Chase Elliott	Hendrick Motorsports	Chevrolet	7
5	48	Alex Bowman	Hendrick Motorsports	Chevrolet	6
6	8	Tyler Reddick	Richard Childress Racing	Chevrolet	5
7	11	Denny Hamlin	Joe Gibbs Racing	Toyota	4
8	3	Austin Dillon	Richard Childress Racing	Chevrolet	3
9	23	Bubba Wallace	23XI Racing	Toyota	2
10	4	Kevin Harvick	Stewart-Haas Racing	Ford	1
Official stage three results

=== Final Stage Results ===
Stage Four Laps: 100

Pos	Grid	No	Driver	Team	Manufacturer	Laps	Points
1	1	5	Kyle Larson	Hendrick Motorsports	Chevrolet	400	70
2	3	9	Chase Elliott	Hendrick Motorsports	Chevrolet	400	60
3	20	18	Kyle Busch	Joe Gibbs Racing	Toyota	400	54
4	4	24	William Byron	Hendrick Motorsports	Chevrolet	400	58
5	7	48	Alex Bowman	Hendrick Motorsports	Chevrolet	400	43
6	6	3	Austin Dillon	Richard Childress Racing	Chevrolet	400	41
7	14	11	Denny Hamlin	Joe Gibbs Racing	Toyota	400	36
8	27	17	Chris Buescher	Roush Fenway Racing	Ford	400	32
9	15	8	Tyler Reddick	Richard Childress Racing	Chevrolet	400	42
10	5	4	Kevin Harvick	Stewart-Haas Racing	Ford	400	40
11	13	2	Brad Keselowski	Team Penske	Ford	400	26
12	2	47	Ricky Stenhouse Jr.	JTG Daugherty Racing	Chevrolet	400	27
13	11	12	Ryan Blaney	Team Penske	Ford	400	24
14	18	23	Bubba Wallace	23XI Racing	Toyota	400	25
15	9	99	Daniel Suárez	Trackhouse Racing Team	Chevrolet	398	22
16	19	43	Erik Jones	Richard Petty Motorsports	Chevrolet	398	21
17	16	22	Joey Logano	Team Penske	Ford	398	20
18	22	21	Matt DiBenedetto	Wood Brothers Racing	Ford	398	19
19	26	7	Corey LaJoie	Spire Motorsports	Chevrolet	398	18
20	24	34	Michael McDowell	Front Row Motorsports	Ford	398	17
21	23	41	Cole Custer	Stewart-Haas Racing	Ford	397	16
22	31	10	Aric Almirola	Stewart-Haas Racing	Ford	397	15
23	21	14	Chase Briscoe (R)	Stewart-Haas Racing	Ford	397	14
24	17	20	Christopher Bell	Joe Gibbs Racing	Toyota	397	13
25	29	38	Anthony Alfredo (R)	Front Row Motorsports	Ford	397	12
26	28	37	Ryan Preece	JTG Daugherty Racing	Chevrolet	397	11
27	25	6	Ryan Newman	Roush Fenway Racing	Ford	396	10
28	30	77	Justin Haley (i)	Spire Motorsports	Chevrolet	395	0
29	8	19	Martin Truex Jr.	Joe Gibbs Racing	Toyota	391	12
30	34	53	Cody Ware (i)	Rick Ware Racing	Chevrolet	389	0
31	33	78	B. J. McLeod (i)	Live Fast Motorsports	Ford	389	0
32	32	00	Quin Houff	StarCom Racing	Chevrolet	389	5
33	35	15	James Davison	Rick Ware Racing	Chevrolet	388	4
34	36	51	Garrett Smithley (i)	Petty Ware Racing	Chevrolet	387	0
35	37	52	Josh Bilicki	Rick Ware Racing	Ford	382	2
36	38	66	David Starr (i)	MBM Motorsports	Toyota	369	0
37	10	42	Ross Chastain	Chip Ganassi Racing	Chevrolet	359	1
38	12	1	Kurt Busch	Chip Ganassi Racing	Chevrolet	139	1
Official race results

=== Race statistics ===
- Lead changes: 23 among 13 different drivers
- Cautions/Laps: 4 for 26
- Red flags: 0
- Time of race: 3 hours, 58 minutes and 45 seconds
- Average speed: 150.785 miles per hour (242.665 km/h)

== Media ==
=== Television ===
Fox Sports televised the race in the United States for the 21st consecutive year. Mike Joy was the lap-by-lap announcer, while three-time Coca-Cola 600 winner, Jeff Gordon and 2012 Fall Charlotte winner Clint Bowyer were the color commentators. Jamie Little, Regan Smith and Vince Welch reported from pit lane during the race. Larry McReynolds provided insight from the Fox Sports studio in Charlotte.

Fox
Booth announcers	Pit reporters	In-race analyst
Lap-by-lap: Mike Joy; Color-commentator: Jeff Gordon; Color-commentator: Clint Bowyer	Jamie Little; Regan Smith; Vince Welch	Larry McReynolds

=== Radio ===
Radio coverage of the race was broadcast by the Performance Racing Network (PRN), and was simulcasted on Sirius XM NASCAR Radio. Doug Rice and Mark Garrow called the race in the booth when the field raced through the quad-oval. Rob Albright called the race from a billboard in turn 2 when the field was racing through turns 1 and 2 and halfway down the backstretch. Pat Patterson called the race from a billboard outside of turn 3 when the field raced through the other half of the backstretch and through turns 3 and 4. Brad Gillie, Brett McMillan and Wendy Venturini were the pit reporters during the broadcast.

PRN Radio
Booth announcers	Turn announcers	Pit reporters
Lead announcer: Doug Rice; Announcer: Mark Garrow	Turns 1 & 2: Rob Albright; Turns 3 & 4: Pat Patterson	Brad Gillie; Brett McMillan; Wendy Venturini

== Standings after the race ==
Drivers' Championship standings

	Pos	Driver	Points
	1	Denny Hamlin	633
1	2	Kyle Larson	557 (–76)
1	3	William Byron	557 (–76)
1	4	Chase Elliott	541 (–92)
1	5	Joey Logano	506 (–127)
	6	Martin Truex Jr.	486 (–147)
	7	Ryan Blaney	482 (–151)
2	8	Kyle Busch	476 (–157)
1	9	Kevin Harvick	468 (–165)
1	10	Brad Keselowski	448 (–185)
	11	Austin Dillon	407 (–226)
	12	Alex Bowman	405 (–224)
2	13	Tyler Reddick	376 (–257)
1	14	Chris Buescher	370 (–263)
1	15	Christopher Bell	350 (–383)
	16	Michael McDowell	346 (–287)
Official driver's standings

Manufacturers' Championship standings

Pos	Manufacturer	Points
1	Chevrolet	547
2	Ford	523 (–24)
3	Toyota	513 (–34)

- Note: Only the first 16 positions are included for the driver standings.
- . – Driver has clinched a position in the NASCAR Cup Series playoffs.

Previous race: 2021 Texas Grand Prix	NASCAR Cup Series; 2021 season	Next race: 2021 Toyota/Save Mart 350
