= James Davison =

Australian racing driver (born 1986)

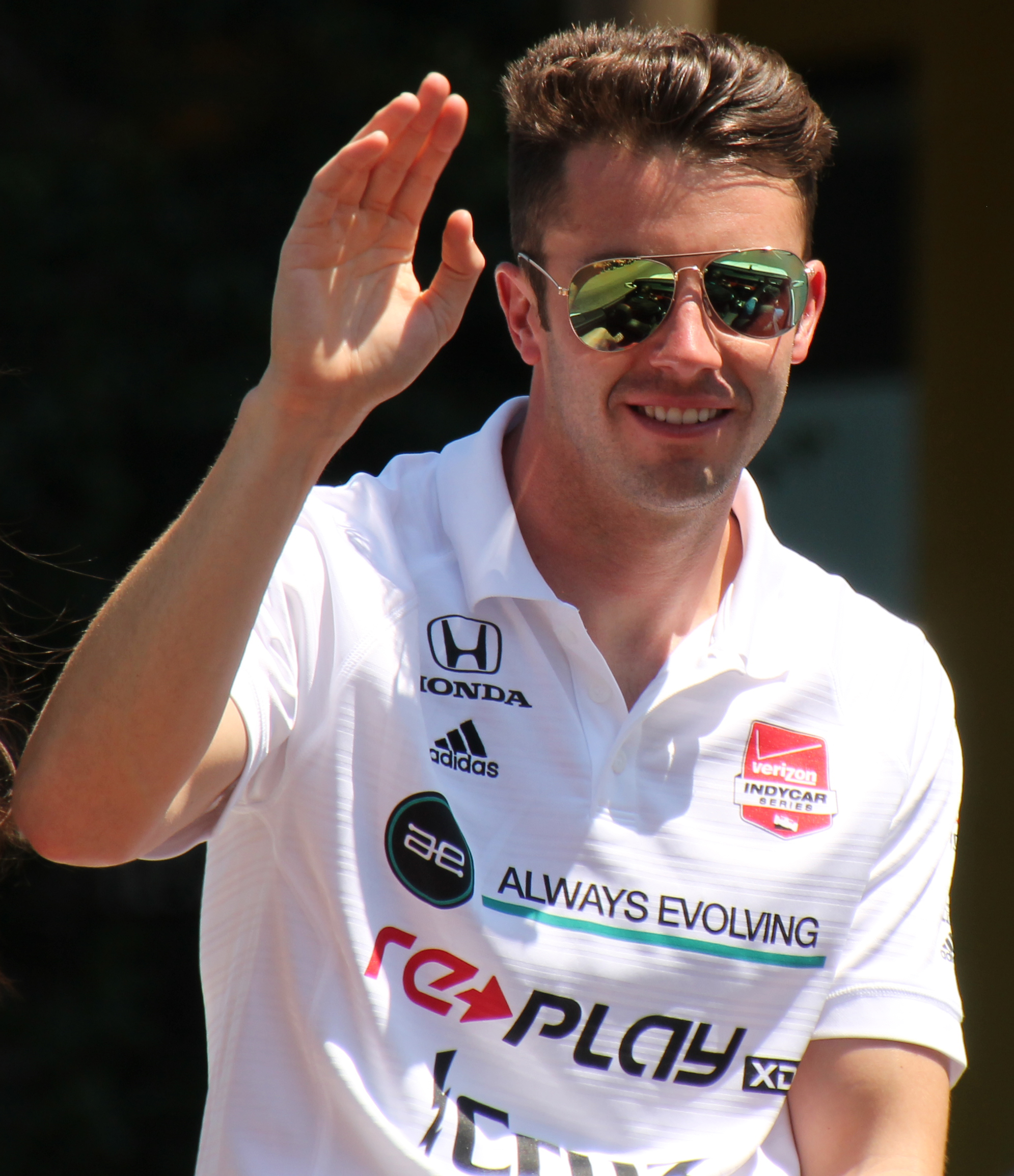
- Davison at the 2015 Indianapolis 500
- Nationality: Australian
- Born: James Douglas Davison; 28 August 1986 (age 40) Melbourne, Australia
- Relatives: Jon Davison (father); Lex Davison (grandfather); Diana Davison (grandmother); Richard Davison (uncle); Alex Davison (cousin); Will Davison (cousin); Tony Gaze (step-grandfather); Fisichella Davison (daughter)

Blancpain GT World Challenge America career
- Debut season: 2016
- Categorisation: FIA Gold
- Teams: AE Replay XD Nissan GT Academy
- Starts: 20
- Wins: 16
- Poles: 1
- Fastest laps: 1
- Best finish: 4th in 2015

Previous series
- 2004 2005 2006 2007 2008-09 2010–12: Victorian Formula Ford; Formula BMW USA; Champ Car Atlantic; Star Mazda Championship; Firestone Indy Lights; Grand-Am Series

IndyCar Series career
- 8 races run over 7 years
- 2020 position: 34th
- Best finish: 28th (2019)
- First race: 2013 Honda Indy 200 at Mid-Ohio (Mid-Ohio)
- Last race: 2020 Indianapolis 500 (Indianapolis)
Wins	Podiums	Poles
0	0	0

NASCAR Cup Series career
- 35 races run over 2 years
- 2020 position: 37th
- Best finish: 32nd (2021)
- First race: 2020 Pocono Organics 325 (Pocono)
- Last race: 2021 YellaWood 500 (Talladega)
Wins	Top tens	Poles
0	0	0

NASCAR O'Reilly Auto Parts Series career
- 6 races run over 5 years
- 2022 position: 53rd
- Best finish: 47th (2017)
- First race: 2016 Road America 180 (Road America)
- Last race: 2022 Drive for the Cure 250 (Charlotte Roval)
Wins	Top tens	Poles
0	3	0
- Statistics up to date as of 24 June 2023.

James Douglas Davison (born 28 August 1986) is an Australian professional racing driver who drives an Aston Martin Vantage GT3 in the Blancpain GT World Challenge America. He has also competed in the NTT IndyCar Series, NASCAR Cup Series, and NASCAR Xfinity Series. He is sometimes also called JD (or J. D.) Davison.

His father Jon Davison was a Formula 5000 competitor and was the long-running promoter of racing events at Sandown Raceway. Davison's grandfather, Lex Davison, was a four-time winner of the Australian Grand Prix. He is a cousin of V8 Supercar drivers Alex and Will Davison. He also competed as a coxswain as part of Scotch College's championship-winning rowing crew in 2003.

== Racing career ==
=== Open-wheel ===
==== Junior formula ====
In 2004, Davison joined the ranks of Formula Ford in his native Australia, running in both the Victorian and National Championships. At the end of 2004, he won a scholarship at the BMW Junior Scholarship Finals in Valencia. For 2005, he competed in the Formula BMW USA Junior Series, qualifying on the front row at the Canadian Formula 1 Grand Prix in Montreal, won at the US Grand Prix held at the world-famous Indianapolis Motor Speedway, was second at the Denver street circuit and Mid-Ohio and third at Barber Motorsports Park and Road Atlanta. Based on these performances, Davison became part of the Confederation of Australian Motorsport Elite Driver program which included attendance at the Australian Institute of Sport and financial support from the Foundation. At the end of the season, he qualified and finished tenth at the Formula BMW Final at Bahrain.

2006 saw Davison again compete in the United States in the Formula Atlantic series for Team Australia. After the Denver round, he was dropped by the team for fellow Aussie Michael Patrizi. 2007 saw Davison progress into the Star Mazda Championship where current IndyCar Series drivers Marco Andretti and Graham Rahal previously competed. Driving for Velocity Motorsports, Davison proved to be an outstanding competitor finishing second in the Championship; earning three pole positions and one win.

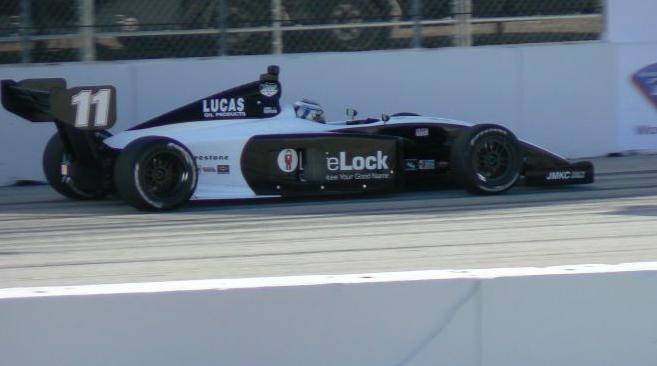
Davison driving in Indy Lights at St. Petersburg

==== Indy Lights ====
2008 found Davison in the Firestone Indy Lights series, racing for Sam Schmidt Motorsports. He struggled throughout the first half of the season, but captured his first series pole at Nashville Superspeedway, a concrete oval, in July. His first win came in bizarre circumstances in a wet race at Mid-Ohio. While running second on the last lap, race leader Jonny Reid went into pit lane instead of the finish line, handing Davison the victory. Davison also received the Sunoco Most Improved Driver Award at the IRL Championship Celebration held in Las Vegas. Davison finished second in the 2009 Firestone Indy Lights Championship with a new team Vision Racing, again winning at Mid-Ohio. Davison was running at the finish of all fifteen races and finished in the top ten in all but one.

==== IndyCar ====
In November 2011, Davison tested for Andretti Autosport at Palm Beach International Raceway, Florida. He shared the car with Indy Lights driver Gustavo Yacaman.

In 2013, Davison tested a car for Dale Coyne Racing at the Mid-Ohio Sports Car Course. A few weeks later, it was announced that he would drive the team's No. 18 car at the race there. It would be his first open wheel race appearance since 2009. Following the horrific accident by Sebastian Bourdais during qualifying for the 2017 Indianapolis 500, it was announced that Davison would be stepping into the No. 18 Dale Coyne Racing Honda. In the later stages of the race, Davison matched a record set by Tom Sneva in 1980 and became the third driver in Indy history to start 33rd and lead laps in the race, having led two laps. He then got caught up in a late wreck with 17 laps to go. A year later, Davison barely qualified for the 2018 Indianapolis 500, bumping out longtime IndyCar rival James Hinchcliffe. He would finish in last place, after a crash on lap 47 caused by contact with Takuma Sato's car. Davison finished in last place again at the 2020 Indianapolis 500 due to a mechanical failure only six laps into the race.

=== Historic racing ===
In 2011, Davison drove his Uncle Richard Davison's Lola T332 Formula 5000 car at Phillip Island and Albert Park. In 2012, he returned to drive it again at Phillip Island. In 2019, he drove a Lotus 18 at Goodwood and Lotus 81 at Silverstone. In 2022, Davison drove a Hill GH1 at the 13th Historic Monaco. Then drove again at Spa in September.

=== Sports car racing ===
2010 saw Davison make his sportscar debut in the Grand-Am Series for Starworks Motorsports Corsa Car Care Dinan-BMW Riley partnering Ryan Dalziel and Mike Forest in the Sahlen's Six Hours of The Glen finishing seventh. He was then drafted in to run at the 6 Hours of Watkins Glen the Crown Royal 200 also at Watkins Glen. In 2011, he drove for Michael Shank Racing at Laguna Seca.

Driving with The Racer's Group in an Aston Martin in 2014, Davison scored four consecutive GTD class poles across the final races of the 2014 and first race of the 2015 season.

In 2015, Davison joined Nismo factory team to drive a Nissan GT-R in the Pirelli World Challenge. He continued with Always Evolving Racing in the GT-R in 2016 before moving to The Racer's Group for the 2017 season.

=== NASCAR ===
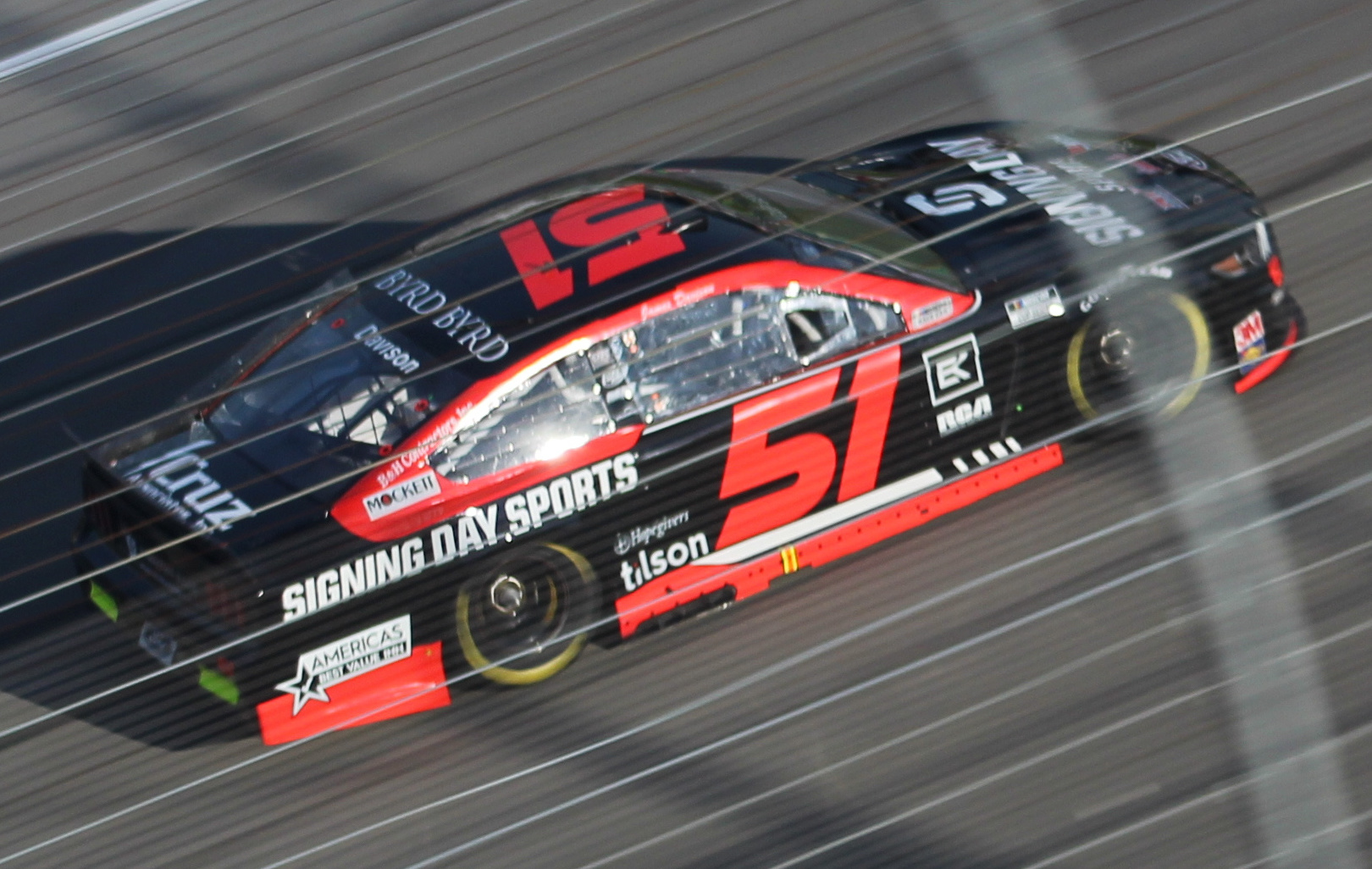
Davison's No. 51 car at Michigan International Speedway in 2020

Davison made his first NASCAR start in 2016, driving the No. 90 King Autosport car in the Xfinity Series for the Road America 180. He started 18th and went down one position after making contact with Scott Heckert on the last lap.

In 2020, Davison raced in the Cup Series for the first time in the Pocono Organics 325 at Pocono Raceway with Spire Motorsports. His Cup debut had been delayed on two occasions earlier in the season, with a Daytona 500 start for Jonathan Byrd's Racing ultimately failing to materalise, while his GEICO 500 entry at Talladega Superspeedway with Spire was disallowed due to his lack of experience on such tracks. He returned to the series at Loudon with Rick Ware Racing.

Davison committed to an approximately 26-race schedule with RWR for the 2021 Cup season. In May, he dominated the eNASCAR iRacing Pro Invitational Series race at Circuit of the Americas, leading 32 of 33 laps and finished twelve seconds ahead of Anthony Alfredo. He continued his dominance in the series at the virtually-designed Chicago Street Course, capturing the pole, leading every lap, and winning by 56 seconds over his Rick Ware Racing teammate Josh Bilicki. He also raced at the 2021 YellaWood 500 for the No. 66 MBM Motorsports Ford with sponsorship from Rich Mar Florist.

== Motorsports career results ==
Season	Series	Position	Car	Team
2004	Victorian Formula Ford Championship	6th	Van Diemen RF95 – Ford	Alex Davison
2004	Australian Formula Ford Championship	21st	Van Diemen RF95 – Ford	Alex Davison
2005	Formula BMW USA	6th	Mygale FB02 – BMW	HBR Motorsport
2005	Formula BMW World Final	10th	Mygale FB02 – BMW	Team Meritus
2006	Champ Car Atlantic	17th	Swift 016.a – Mazda Cosworth	Walker Racing
2007	Star Mazda Championship	**2nd**	Star – Mazda	Velocity Motorsports
2008	Indy Lights	9th	Dallara IPS – Infiniti	Sam Schmidt Motorsports
2009	Indy Lights	**2nd**	Dallara IPS – Infiniti	Vision Racing
2010	Rolex Sports Car Series	34th	Riley & Scott Mk. XX – BMW	Starworks Motorsport
2011	Rolex Sports Car Series	56th	Riley & Scott Mk. XX – Ford	Michael Shank Racing
2012	Australian Carrera Cup Championship	20th	Porsche 997 GT3 Cup	McElrea Racing
2013	IndyCar	32nd	Dallara DW12-Honda	Dale Coyne Racing
2014	Continental Tire Sports Car Challenge - GS	37th	Aston Martin V12 Vantage GT3	TRG - AMR
2014	United Sports Car Championship - GTD	21st	Aston Martin V12 Vantage GT3	TRG - AMR
2014	IndyCar	29th	Dallara DW12-Chevrolet	KV Racing Technology
2015	Pirelli World Challenge - GT	4th	Nissan GT-R GT3	AE/Replay XD/Nissan GT Academy
2015	United Sports Car Championship - GTD	15th	Aston Martin V12 Vantage GT3	TRG - AMR
2015	IndyCar	38th	Dallara DW12-Honda	Dale Coyne Racing
2016	Pirelli World Challenge - GT	7th	Nissan GT-R GT3	AE/Replay XD/Nissan GT Academy
2016	WeatherTech SportsCar Championship - GTD	37th	Aston Martin V12 Vantage GT3	TRG - AMR
2016	Lamborghini Super Trofeo North America - ProAm	11th	Lamborghini Huracán LP620-2	TRG - Lamborghini
2016	NASCAR Xfinity Series	63rd	Chevrolet	King Autosport
2017	Pirelli World Challenge - GT	45th	Aston Martin Vantage GT3; Lamborghini Huracan GT3	TRG/DIME Racing
2017	WeatherTech SportsCar Championship - GTD	71st	Aston Martin V12 Vantage GT3	TRG
2017	IndyCar	35th	Dallara DW12-Honda	Dale Coyne Racing
2017	NASCAR Xfinity Series	43rd	Toyota	Joe Gibbs Racing
2018	IndyCar	41st	Dallara DW12-Chevrolet	A. J. Foyt Enterprises; Byrd-Hollinger-Belardi
2018	NASCAR Xfinity Series	56th	Toyota	Joe Gibbs Racing
2019	IndyCar	28th	Dallara DW12-Honda	Dale Coyne Racing; Byrd-Hollinger-Belardi
2020	NASCAR Cup Series	37th	Chevrolet	Spire Motorsports; Rick Ware Racing
2021	NASCAR Cup Series	32nd	Chevrolet; Ford	Rick Ware Racing; MBM Motorsports
2022	NASCAR Xfinity Series	53rd	Toyota	Joe Gibbs Racing

=== American open-wheel racing results ===
(key)

==== Champ Car Atlantic results ====
Year	Team	1	2	3	4	5	6	7	8	9	10	11	12	Rank	Points
2006	Team Australia	LBH; 13	HOU; 10	MTY; 21	POR; 25	CLE1; 13	CLE2; 13	TOR; 12	EDM; 13	SJO; 7	DEN; 22	MTL	ROA	17th	69

==== Star Mazda Championship ====
Year	Team	1	2	3	4	5	6	7	8	9	10	11	12	Rank	Points
2007	Velocity Motorsports	SEB; 3	HOU; 7	VIR; 4	MMP; 2	POR; 13	CLE; 17	TOR; 5	RAM; 4	TRO; 11	MOS; 1	RAT; 5	LAG; 3	2nd	389

==== Indy Lights results ====
Year	Team	1	2	3	4	5	6	7	8	9	10	11	12	13	14	15	16	Rank	Points
2008	Sam Schmidt Motorsports	HMS; 22	STP1; 13	STP2; 14	KAN; 11	INDY; 17	MIL; 6	IOW; 15	WGL1; Ret	WGL2; 11	NSH; Ret	MOH1; 7	**MOH2**; 1	KTY; 2	SNM1; 14	SNM2; 13	CHI; 5	9th	333
2009	Vision Racing	STP1; 8	STP2; 17	LBH; 7	KAN; 8	INDY; 6	MIL; 5	IOW; 10	WGL; 2	TOR; 5	EDM; 10	KTY; 4	**MOH**; 1	SNM; 3	CHI; 2	HMS; 5		2nd	447

==== IndyCar Series ====
Year	Team	No.	Chassis	Engine	1	2	3	4	5	6	7	8	9	10	11	12	13	14	15	16	17	18	19	Rank	Points	Ref
2013	Dale Coyne Racing	18	Dallara DW12	Honda	STP	ALA	LBH	SAO	INDY	DET	DET	TXS	MIL	IOW	POC	TOR	TOR	MOH; 15	SNM; 18	BAL	HOU	HOU	FON	32nd	27	
2014	KV Racing Technology	33	Dallara DW12	Chevrolet	STP	LBH	ALA	IMS	INDY; 16	DET	DET	TXS	HOU	HOU	POC	IOW	TOR	TOR	MOH	MIL	SNM	FON		29th	34	
2015	Dale Coyne Racing	19	Dallara DW12	Honda	STP	NLA	LBH	ALA	IMS	INDY; 27	DET	DET	TXS	TOR	FON	MIL	IOW	MOH	POC	SNM				38th	10	
2017	Dale Coyne Racing	18	Dallara DW12	Honda	STP	LBH	ALA	PHX	IMS	INDY; 20	DET	DET	TXS	ROA	IOW	TOR	MOH	POC	GTW	WGL	SNM			35th	21	
2018	A. J. Foyt Enterprises with Byrd-Hollinger-Belardi	33	Dallara DW12	Chevrolet	STP	PHX	LBH	ALA	IMS	INDY; 33	DET	DET	TXS	RDA	IOW	TOR	MOH	POC	GTW	POR	SNM			41st	10	
2019	Dale Coyne Racing with Byrd/Hollinger/Belardi	33	Dallara DW12	Honda	STP	COA	ALA	LBH	IMS	INDY; 12	DET	DET	TXS	RDA	TOR	IOW	MOH	POC	GTW	POR	LAG			28th	36	
2020	Dale Coyne Racing with Rick Ware Racing & Byrd Belardi	51	Dallara DW12	Honda	TXS	IMS	ROA	ROA	IOW	IOW	INDY; 33	GTW	GTW	MOH	MOH	IMS	IMS	STP						34th	10	

==== Indianapolis 500 ====
Year	Chassis	Engine	Start	Finish	Team
2014	Dallara	Chevrolet	28	16	KV Racing Technology
2015	Dallara	Honda	33	27	Dale Coyne Racing
2017	Dallara	Honda	33	20	Dale Coyne Racing
2018	Dallara	Chevrolet	19	33	Foyt with Byrd / Hollinger / Belardi
2019	Dallara	Honda	15	12	Dale Coyne Racing with Byrd / Hollinger / Belardi
2020	Dallara	Honda	27	33	Dale Coyne Racing with Rick Ware Racing & Byrd Belardi

=== Sports car racing results ===
(key)

==== Rolex Sports Car Series ====
Year	Team	Make	Engine	Class	1	2	3	4	5	6	7	8	9	10	11	12	13	Rank	Points
2010	Starworks Motorsport	Riley	BMW	DP	DAY	HOM	BAR	VIR	LRP	WAT1; 7	MOH	DAY2	NJ	WAT2; Ret	CGV	MIL		34th	24
2011	Michael Shank Racing	Riley	Ford	DP	DAY	HOM	BAR	VIR	LRP	WAT1	RDA	LAG; Ret	NJ	WAT2	CGV	MOH		56th	11
2012	Michael Baughman Racing	Corvette	Chev	GT	DAY	BMP	HMS	NJ	BIP	MOH	RA	WAT1	IMS; Ret	WAT2; 8	CGV	LAG	LRP	57th	23

==== IMSA SportsCar Championship ====
Year	Team	Make	Engine	Class	1	2	3	4	5	6	7	8	9	10	11	12	Rank	Points
2014	TRG-AMR North America	Aston Martin Vantage GT3	Aston Martin 6.0 L V12	GTD	DAY; 22	SEB; 19	LGA; 13	DET; 4	WGL; 11	MOS; 12	IMS; 7	**ELK**; DNS	**VIR**; 12	**COA**; 19	**PET**; 10		25th	196
2015	TRG-AMR North America	Aston Martin Vantage GT3	Aston Martin 6.0 L V12	GTD	**DAY**; 13	SEB; 2	LGA; 5	DET; 2	WGL	LIM	ELK	VIR	COA	PET			15th	113
2016	TRG-AMR	Aston Martin Vantage GT3	Aston Martin 6.0 L V12	GTD	DAY; 20	SEB	LGA; 3	DET	WGL	MOS	LIM	ELK	VIR	COA	PET		37th	32
2017	TRG	Aston Martin Vantage GT3	Aston Martin 6.0 L V12	GTD	DAY	SEB	LBH	COA	DET	WGL	MOS	LIM	ELK; 13	VIR	LGA	PET	71st	18
2022	Gilbert Korthoff Motorsports	Mercedes-AMG GT3 Evo	Mercedes-AMG M159 6.2 L V8	GTD	DAY; 3	SEB	LBH	LGA	MOH	DET	WGL	MOS	LIM	ELK	VIR	PET	51st	326

==== Pirelli World Challenge ====
Year	Team	Make	Engine	Class	1	2	3	4	5	6	7	8	9	10	11	12	13	14	15	16	17	18	19	20	Rank	Points
2015	Always Evolving	Nissan GT-R		GT	AUS1; 6	AUS2; 16	STP1; 6	STP2; 16	LBH; 5	BAR1; **1***	BAR2; 11	MOS1; 9	MOS2; 20	DET; 5	ELK1; 2	ELK2; 2	ELK3; 1*	MOH1; 2	MOH2; 2	MIL1; 2	MIL2; 2	SON1; 7	SON2; 6	LAG; 7	4th	1562
2016	Always Evolving	Nissan GT-R		GT	AUS1; 4	AUS2; 13	STP1; 19	STP2; 2	LBH; 4	BAR1; 4	BAR2; 8	MOS1; 5	MOS2; 2	LRP1; 12	LRP2; 5	ELK1; 5	ELK2; 18	MOH1; 17†	MOH2; 5	UTA1 (Note: J. D. Davison had been suspended at Utah Motorsports Campus after making avoidable contact at Mid-Ohio while on probation.)	UTA2	SON1; 11	SON2; 7	LAG; 7	7th	1210
2017	The Racer's Group	Aston Martin Vantage GT3		GT	STP1; 2	STP2; 21	LBH																		45th	44
2017	Dime Racing	Lamborghini Huracan GT3		SprintX				VIR1; 13	VIR2; 9	MOS1	LRP1	LRP2	ELK1	ELK2	MOH1	MOH2	UTA1	UTA2	COA1	COA2	COA3	SON1	SON2		45th	44

=== NASCAR ===
(key) (Bold – Pole position awarded by qualifying time. Italics – Pole position earned by points standings or practice time. * – Most laps led.)

==== Cup Series ====
NASCAR Cup Series results
Year	Team	No.	Make	1	2	3	4	5	6	7	8	9	10	11	12	13	14	15	16	17	18	19	20	21	22	23	24	25	26	27	28	29	30	31	32	33	34	35	36	NCSC	Pts	Ref
2020	Spire Motorsports	77	Chevy	DAY	LVS	CAL	PHO	DAR	DAR	CLT	CLT	BRI	ATL	MAR	HOM	TAL	POC; 34	POC; 30	IND	KEN	TEX	KAN																		37th	56	
2020	Rick Ware Racing	53	Chevy																				NHA; 30							DAR; 39	RCH; 37	BRI; 35	LVS	TAL; 30	ROV; 29					37th	56	
2020	Rick Ware Racing	51	Ford																					MCH; 38	MCH; 37				DAY; 39											37th	56	
2020	Rick Ware Racing	51	Chevy																							DRC; 30	DOV	DOV												37th	56	
2020	Rick Ware Racing	53	Ford																																	KAN; 32	TEX	MAR; 36	PHO; 33	37th	56	
2021	Rick Ware Racing	15	Chevy	DAY	DRC; 23	HOM; 37	LVS	PHO; 33	ATL; 32	BRD	MAR; 22	RCH; 33	TAL	KAN	DAR; 31	DOV; 33	COA; 29	CLT; 33	SON; 25	NSH	POC; 28	POC; 30	ROA; 28	ATL	NHA; 36		IRC; 32	MCH	DAY			BRI; 33	LVS							32nd	117	
2021	Rick Ware Racing	51	Ford																							GLN; 37														32nd	117	
2021	Rick Ware Racing	53	Chevy																											DAR; 36	RCH									32nd	117	
2021	MBM Motorsports	66	Ford																															TAL; 34	ROV	TEX	KAN	MAR	PHO	32nd	117	

==== Xfinity Series ====
NASCAR Xfinity Series results
Year	Team	No.	Make	1	2	3	4	5	6	7	8	9	10	11	12	13	14	15	16	17	18	19	20	21	22	23	24	25	26	27	28	29	30	31	32	33	NXSC	Pts	Ref
2016	King Autosport	90	Chevy	DAY	ATL	LVS	PHO	CAL	TEX	BRI	RCH	TAL	DOV	CLT	POC	MCH	IOW	DAY	KEN	NHA	IND	IOW	GLN	MOH	BRI	ROA; 19	DAR	RCH	CHI	KEN	DOV	CLT	KAN	TEX	PHO	HOM	63rd	22	
2017	Joe Gibbs Racing	20	Toyota	DAY	ATL	LVS	PHO	CAL	TEX	BRI	RCH	TAL	CLT	DOV	POC	MCH	IOW	DAY	KEN	NHA	IND	IOW	GLN	MOH; 4	BRI	ROA; 37*	DAR	RCH	CHI	KEN	DOV	CLT	KAN	TEX	PHO	HOM	47th	52	
2018	Joe Gibbs Racing	18	Toyota	DAY	ATL	LVS	PHO	CAL	TEX	BRI	RCH	TAL	DOV	CLT	POC	MCH	IOW	CHI	DAY	KEN	NHA	IOW	GLN	MOH	BRI	ROA; 8	DAR	IND	LVS	RCH	ROV	DOV	KAN	TEX	PHO	HOM	56th	29	
2021	B. J. McLeod Motorsports	5	Toyota	DAY	DRC	HOM	LVS	PHO	ATL	MAR	TAL	DAR	DOV	COA	CLT	MOH	TEX	NSH	POC	ROA	ATL	NHA	GLN	IRC; 18	MCH	DAY	DAR	RCH	BRI	LVS	TAL	ROV	TEX	KAN	MAR	PHO	94th	0^{1}	
2022	Joe Gibbs Racing	18	Toyota	DAY	CAL	LVS	PHO	ATL	COA	RCH	MAR	TAL	DOV	DAR	TEX	CLT	PIR	NSH	ROA	ATL	NHA	POC	IRC	MCH	GLN	DAY	DAR	KAN	BRI	TEX	TAL	ROV; 4	LVS	HOM	MAR	PHO	53rd	43	

^{*} Season still in progress
^{1} Ineligible for series points

=== Complete S5000 results ===
Year	Series	Team	1	2	3	4	5	6	7	8	9	10	11	12	13	14	15	Position	Points
2020	Australian	Team BRM	APC; R1; PO	APC; R2; PO	SMP; R3; C	SMP; R4; C	WIN; R5; C	WIN; R6; C	BMP; R7; C	BMP; R8; C	PHI; R9; C	PHI; R10; C	SAN; R11; C	SAN; R12; C				N/C	-
2022	Australian	Team BRM	SYM; R1	SYM; R2	SYM; R3	PHI; R4	PHI; R5	PHI; R6	MEL; R7; Ret	MEL; R8; Ret	MEL; R9; 11	SMP; R10	SMP; R11	SMP; R12	HID; R13	HID; R14	HID; R15	20th	14
