= 2021 Pocono Organics CBD 325 =

NASCAR Cup Series race

Race details
- Race 18 of 36 in the 2021 NASCAR Cup Series
- Date: June 26, 2021
- Location: Pocono Raceway in Long Pond, Pennsylvania
- Course: Permanent racing facility
- Course length: 2.5 miles (4 km)
- Distance: 130 laps, 325 mi (523 km)
- Average speed: 129.453 miles per hour (208.334 km/h)

Pole position
Driver	Kyle Larson	Hendrick Motorsports
- Grid positions set by competition-based formula

Most laps led
Driver	Kyle Busch	Joe Gibbs Racing
- Laps: 30

Winner
No. 48	Alex Bowman	Hendrick Motorsports

Television in the United States
- Network: NBCSN
- Announcers: Rick Allen, Jeff Burton, Steve Letarte and Dale Earnhardt Jr.
- Nielsen ratings: 0.90/1.448 million

Radio in the United States
- Radio: MRN
- Booth announcers: Alex Hayden and Jeff Striegle
- Turn announcers: Dave Moody (1), Mike Bagley (2) and Kurt Becker (3)

The 2021 Pocono Organics CBD 325 was a NASCAR Cup Series race that was held on June 26, 2021, at Pocono Raceway in Long Pond, Pennsylvania. Contested over 130 laps on the 2.5-mile (4.0 km) triangular racecourse, it was the 18th race of the 2021 NASCAR Cup Series season.

This was the final time the Cup Series had a second race at Pocono, as the track lost its second race in 2022.

== Entry list ==
- (R) denotes rookie driver.
- (i) denotes driver who are ineligible for series driver points.

No.	Driver	Team	Manufacturer
00	Quin Houff	StarCom Racing	Chevrolet
1	Kurt Busch	Chip Ganassi Racing	Chevrolet
2	Brad Keselowski	Team Penske	Ford
3	Austin Dillon	Richard Childress Racing	Chevrolet
4	Kevin Harvick	Stewart-Haas Racing	Ford
5	Kyle Larson	Hendrick Motorsports	Chevrolet
6	Ryan Newman	Roush Fenway Racing	Ford
7	Corey LaJoie	Spire Motorsports	Chevrolet
8	Tyler Reddick	Richard Childress Racing	Chevrolet
9	Chase Elliott	Hendrick Motorsports	Chevrolet
10	Aric Almirola	Stewart-Haas Racing	Ford
11	Denny Hamlin	Joe Gibbs Racing	Toyota
12	Ryan Blaney	Team Penske	Ford
14	Chase Briscoe (R)	Stewart-Haas Racing	Ford
15	James Davison	Rick Ware Racing	Chevrolet
17	Chris Buescher	Roush Fenway Racing	Ford
18	Kyle Busch	Joe Gibbs Racing	Toyota
19	Martin Truex Jr.	Joe Gibbs Racing	Toyota
20	Christopher Bell	Joe Gibbs Racing	Toyota
21	Matt DiBenedetto	Wood Brothers Racing	Ford
22	Joey Logano	Team Penske	Ford
23	Bubba Wallace	23XI Racing	Toyota
24	William Byron	Hendrick Motorsports	Chevrolet
34	Michael McDowell	Front Row Motorsports	Ford
37	Ryan Preece	JTG Daugherty Racing	Chevrolet
38	Anthony Alfredo (R)	Front Row Motorsports	Ford
41	Cole Custer	Stewart-Haas Racing	Ford
42	Ross Chastain	Chip Ganassi Racing	Chevrolet
43	Erik Jones	Richard Petty Motorsports	Chevrolet
47	Ricky Stenhouse Jr.	JTG Daugherty Racing	Chevrolet
48	Alex Bowman	Hendrick Motorsports	Chevrolet
51	Cody Ware (i)	Petty Ware Racing	Chevrolet
52	Josh Bilicki	Rick Ware Racing	Ford
53	Garrett Smithley (i)	Rick Ware Racing	Chevrolet
66	Timmy Hill (i)	MBM Motorsports	Toyota
77	Justin Haley (i)	Spire Motorsports	Chevrolet
78	B. J. McLeod (i)	Live Fast Motorsports	Ford
99	Daniel Suárez	Trackhouse Racing Team	Chevrolet
Official entry list

== Qualifying ==
Kyle Larson was awarded the pole for the race as determined by competition-based formula.

=== Starting Lineup ===
Pos	No.	Driver	Team	Manufacturer
1	5	Kyle Larson	Hendrick Motorsports	Chevrolet
2	24	William Byron	Hendrick Motorsports	Chevrolet
3	4	Kevin Harvick	Stewart-Haas Racing	Ford
4	22	Joey Logano	Team Penske	Ford
5	18	Kyle Busch	Joe Gibbs Racing	Toyota
6	42	Ross Chastain	Chip Ganassi Racing	Chevrolet
7	47	Ricky Stenhouse Jr.	JTG Daugherty Racing	Chevrolet
8	1	Kurt Busch	Chip Ganassi Racing	Chevrolet
9	20	Christopher Bell	Joe Gibbs Racing	Toyota
10	11	Denny Hamlin	Joe Gibbs Racing	Toyota
11	10	Aric Almirola	Stewart-Haas Racing	Ford
12	3	Austin Dillon	Richard Childress Racing	Chevrolet
13	48	Alex Bowman	Hendrick Motorsports	Chevrolet
14	99	Daniel Suárez	Trackhouse Racing Team	Chevrolet
15	19	Martin Truex Jr.	Joe Gibbs Racing	Toyota
16	8	Tyler Reddick	Richard Childress Racing	Chevrolet
17	34	Michael McDowell	Front Row Motorsports	Ford
18	2	Brad Keselowski	Team Penske	Ford
19	6	Ryan Newman	Roush Fenway Racing	Ford
20	23	Bubba Wallace	23XI Racing	Toyota
21	21	Matt DiBenedetto	Wood Brothers Racing	Ford
22	43	Erik Jones	Richard Petty Motorsports	Chevrolet
23	7	Corey LaJoie	Spire Motorsports	Chevrolet
24	38	Anthony Alfredo (R)	Front Row Motorsports	Ford
25	17	Chris Buescher	Roush Fenway Racing	Ford
26	41	Cole Custer	Stewart-Haas Racing	Ford
27	12	Ryan Blaney	Team Penske	Ford
28	14	Chase Briscoe (R)	Stewart-Haas Racing	Ford
29	9	Chase Elliott	Hendrick Motorsports	Chevrolet
30	53	Garrett Smithley (i)	Rick Ware Racing	Chevrolet
31	37	Ryan Preece	JTG Daugherty Racing	Chevrolet
32	78	B. J. McLeod (i)	Live Fast Motorsports	Ford
33	52	Josh Bilicki	Rick Ware Racing	Ford
34	77	Justin Haley (i)	Spire Motorsports	Chevrolet
35	51	Cody Ware (i)	Petty Ware Racing	Chevrolet
36	15	James Davison	Rick Ware Racing	Chevrolet
37	00	Quin Houff	StarCom Racing	Chevrolet
38	66	Timmy Hill (i)	MBM Motorsports	Toyota
Official starting lineup

== Race ==
=== Stage Results ===
Stage One Laps: 25

Pos	No	Driver	Team	Manufacturer	Points
1	18	Kyle Busch	Joe Gibbs Racing	Toyota	10
2	24	William Byron	Hendrick Motorsports	Chevrolet	9
3	5	Kyle Larson	Hendrick Motorsports	Chevrolet	8
4	22	Joey Logano	Team Penske	Ford	7
5	4	Kevin Harvick	Stewart-Haas Racing	Ford	6
6	11	Denny Hamlin	Joe Gibbs Racing	Toyota	5
7	1	Kurt Busch	Chip Ganassi Racing	Chevrolet	4
8	99	Daniel Suárez	Trackhouse Racing Team	Chevrolet	3
9	3	Austin Dillon	Richard Childress Racing	Chevrolet	2
10	8	Tyler Reddick	Richard Childress Racing	Chevrolet	1
Official stage one results

Stage Two Laps: 52

Pos	No	Driver	Team	Manufacturer	Points
1	1	Kurt Busch	Chip Ganassi Racing	Chevrolet	10
2	5	Kyle Larson	Hendrick Motorsports	Chevrolet	9
3	22	Joey Logano	Team Penske	Ford	8
4	24	William Byron	Hendrick Motorsports	Chevrolet	7
5	12	Ryan Blaney	Team Penske	Ford	6
6	11	Denny Hamlin	Joe Gibbs Racing	Toyota	5
7	19	Martin Truex Jr.	Joe Gibbs Racing	Toyota	4
8	48	Alex Bowman	Hendrick Motorsports	Chevrolet	3
9	18	Kyle Busch	Joe Gibbs Racing	Toyota	2
10	2	Brad Keselowski	Team Penske	Ford	1
Official stage two results

=== Final Stage Results ===
Stage Three Laps: 53

On the final lap, Kyle Larson, who had passed Alex Bowman for the lead with four laps to go, cut a left front tire entering the final corner at turn three and would hit the wall. Bowman would go on to take the victory from Kyle Busch, who led the most laps, William Byron, Denny Hamlin and Ryan Blaney. Larson was credited with a ninth place finish, crossing the line with a badly damaged car.

Pos	Grid	No	Driver	Team	Manufacturer	Laps	Points
1	13	48	Alex Bowman	Hendrick Motorsports	Chevrolet	130	43
2	5	18	Kyle Busch	Joe Gibbs Racing	Toyota	130	47
3	2	24	William Byron	Hendrick Motorsports	Chevrolet	130	50
4	10	11	Denny Hamlin	Joe Gibbs Racing	Toyota	130	43
5	27	12	Ryan Blaney	Team Penske	Ford	130	38
6	8	1	Kurt Busch	Chip Ganassi Racing	Chevrolet	130	45
7	4	22	Joey Logano	Team Penske	Ford	130	45
8	3	4	Kevin Harvick	Stewart-Haas Racing	Ford	130	35
9	1	5	Kyle Larson	Hendrick Motorsports	Chevrolet	130	45
10	18	2	Brad Keselowski	Team Penske	Ford	130	28
11	16	8	Tyler Reddick	Richard Childress Racing	Chevrolet	130	27
12	29	9	Chase Elliott	Hendrick Motorsports	Chevrolet	130	25
13	14	99	Daniel Suárez	Trackhouse Racing Team	Chevrolet	130	27
14	20	23	Bubba Wallace	23XI Racing	Toyota	130	23
15	7	47	Ricky Stenhouse Jr.	JTG Daugherty Racing	Chevrolet	130	22
16	11	10	Aric Almirola	Stewart-Haas Racing	Ford	130	21
17	9	20	Christopher Bell	Joe Gibbs Racing	Toyota	130	20
18	15	19	Martin Truex Jr.	Joe Gibbs Racing	Toyota	130	23
19	17	34	Michael McDowell	Front Row Motorsports	Ford	130	18
20	25	17	Chris Buescher	Roush Fenway Racing	Ford	130	17
21	12	3	Austin Dillon	Richard Childress Racing	Chevrolet	130	18
22	22	43	Erik Jones	Richard Petty Motorsports	Chevrolet	130	15
23	31	37	Ryan Preece	JTG Daugherty Racing	Chevrolet	130	14
24	28	14	Chase Briscoe (R)	Stewart-Haas Racing	Ford	130	13
25	35	51	Cody Ware (i)	Petty Ware Racing	Chevrolet	130	0
26	24	38	Anthony Alfredo (R)	Front Row Motorsports	Ford	130	11
27	34	77	Justin Haley (i)	Spire Motorsports	Chevrolet	130	0
28	36	15	James Davison	Rick Ware Racing	Chevrolet	130	9
29	30	53	Garrett Smithley (i)	Rick Ware Racing	Chevrolet	130	0
30	32	78	B. J. McLeod (i)	Live Fast Motorsports	Ford	130	0
31	37	00	Quin Houff	StarCom Racing	Chevrolet	130	6
32	21	21	Matt DiBenedetto	Wood Brothers Racing	Ford	129	5
33	6	42	Ross Chastain	Chip Ganassi Racing	Chevrolet	129	4
34	33	52	Josh Bilicki	Rick Ware Racing	Ford	128	3
35	38	66	Timmy Hill (i)	MBM Motorsports	Toyota	126	0
36	23	7	Corey LaJoie	Spire Motorsports	Chevrolet	125	1
37	19	6	Ryan Newman	Roush Fenway Racing	Ford	96	1
38	26	41	Cole Custer	Stewart-Haas Racing	Ford	13	1
Official race results

=== Race statistics ===
- Lead changes: 14 among 9 different drivers
- Cautions/Laps: 8 for 25
- Red flags: 0
- Time of race: 2 hours, 30 minutes and 38 seconds
- Average speed: 129.453 miles per hour (208.334 km/h)

== Race recap ==
For pre-race ceremonies, Monty Self of Motor Racing Outreach gave out the invocation. Ellen Kane would sing the national anthem. A singular USAF C-17 Globemaster III would perform a flyover at the end of the national anthem. Jeff Moyer, CEO of Rodale Institute, would give the starting command.

Kyle Larson would lead the first 5 laps before being passed by William Byron on lap 6. On lap 10, a caution was called for debris in Turn 2. On the restart, Byron would pull away but a lap later, Brad Keselowski, in an attempt to go under Cole Custer, hit Custer in the back and sent Custer into the outside wall, sending cars scattering as Custer slid down into the inside wall. Custer would retire from the race. After pit stops, Kyle Busch would assume the lead. Kyle Busch would pull away from William Byron on the restart and go on to win Stage 1.

On the final lap, Larson would blow a tire on the final turn, hitting the Turn 3 wall. Bowman, who was second at the time would pass Larson and win the race. Larson would eventually crawl to the line, finishing ninth.

== Media ==
=== Television ===
NBC Sports covered the race on the television side. Rick Allen, Jeff Burton, Steve Letarte and Dale Earnhardt Jr. called the race from the broadcast booth. Dave Burns, Marty Snider and Kelli Stavast handled the pit road duties from pit lane. Jac Collinsworth handled the features from the track.

NBCSN
Booth announcers	Pit reporters	Features reporter
Lap-by-lap: Rick Allen; Color-commentator: Jeff Burton; Color-commentator: Steve Letarte; Color-commentator: Dale Earnhardt Jr.	Dave Burns; Marty Snider; Kelli Stavast	Jac Collinsworth

=== Radio ===
MRN had the radio call for the race which was also simulcast on Sirius XM NASCAR Radio. Alex Hayden and Jeff Striegle called the race in the booth when the field raced through the tri-oval. Dave Moody called the race from the Sunoco spotters stand outside turn 2 when the field raced through turns 1 and 2. Mike Bagley called the race from a platform inside the backstretch when the field raced down the backstretch. Kyle Rickey called the race from the Sunoco spotters stand outside turn 3 when the field raced through turn 3. Steve Post and Kim Coon worked pit road for the radio side.

MRN Radio
Booth announcers	Turn announcers	Pit reporters
Lead announcer: Alex Hayden; Announcer: Jeff Striegle	Turns 1 & 2: Dave Moody; Backstretch: Mike Bagley; Turn 3: Kyle Rickey	Steve Post; Kim Coon

== Standings after the race ==
Drivers' Championship standings

	Pos	Driver	Points
	1	Denny Hamlin	729
	2	Kyle Larson	721 (–8)
	3	William Byron	655 (–74)
1	4	Joey Logano	623 (–106)
1	5	Chase Elliott	617 (–112)
	6	Kyle Busch	606 (–123)
	7	Martin Truex Jr.	565 (–164)
	8	Kevin Harvick	552 (–177)
	9	Ryan Blaney	548 (–181)
	10	Brad Keselowski	519 (–210)
1	11	Alex Bowman	513 (–216)
1	12	Austin Dillon	494 (–235)
	13	Tyler Reddick	444 (–285)
3	14	Kurt Busch	413 (–316)
1	15	Christopher Bell	412 (–317)
1	16	Chris Buescher	409 (–320)
Official driver's standings

Manufacturers' Championship standings

Pos	Manufacturer	Points
1	Chevrolet	667
2	Ford	621 (–46)
3	Toyota	610 (–57)

- Note: Only the first 16 positions are included for the driver standings.
- . – Driver has clinched a position in the NASCAR Cup Series playoffs.

Previous race: 2021 Ally 400	NASCAR Cup Series; 2021 season	Next race: 2021 Explore the Pocono Mountains 350
