= 2020 FireKeepers Casino 400 =

NASCAR Cup Series race

Race details
- Race 21 of 36 in the 2020 NASCAR Cup Series
- 2020 FireKeepers Casino 400 program cover
- Date: August 8, 2020
- Location: Michigan International Speedway in Brooklyn, Michigan
- Course: Permanent racing facility
- Course length: 2.0 miles (3.2 km)
- Distance: 161 laps, 322 mi (518.098 km)
- Scheduled distance: 156 laps, 312 mi (502.008 km)
- Average speed: 124.712 miles per hour (200.705 km/h)

Pole position
Driver	Joey Logano	Team Penske
- Grid positions set by ballot

Most laps led
Driver	Kevin Harvick	Stewart-Haas Racing
- Laps: 92

Winner
No. 4	Kevin Harvick	Stewart-Haas Racing

Television in the United States
- Network: NBCSN
- Announcers: Rick Allen, Jeff Burton, Steve Letarte and Dale Earnhardt Jr.
- Nielsen ratings: 1.649 million

Radio in the United States
- Radio: MRN
- Booth announcers: Alex Hayden and Jeff Striegle
- Turn announcers: Dave Moody (1–2) and Kyle Rickey (3–4)

The 2020 FireKeepers Casino 400 is a NASCAR Cup Series race that was originally scheduled to be held on June 7, 2020, at Michigan International Speedway in Brooklyn, Michigan, but moved to August 8, 2020, and to be held over 500 kilometers (312 miles), shortened by 44 laps from the original distance because of modified NASCAR rules for doubleheader races, one of three Cup Series events to be run under the doubleheader format. It was the 21st race of the 2020 NASCAR Cup Series season.

During both Michigan races that season Reed Sorenson ran a special #74 Fake Steak sponsored car fielded by Spire Motorsports that was used to gather footage that was used in the 2021 Netflix sitcom The Crew. Despite being used for filming he was officially classified as being in the race and finished 30th.

== Report ==
=== Background ===
Layout of Michigan International Speedway, the track where the race is held.

The race was held at Michigan International Speedway, a two-mile (3.2 km) moderate-banked D-shaped speedway located in Brooklyn, Michigan. The track is used primarily for NASCAR events. It is sometimes known as a "sister track" to Texas World Speedway, and was used as the basis of Auto Club Speedway. The track is owned by International Speedway Corporation. Michigan International Speedway is recognized as one of motorsports' premier facilities because of its wide racing surface and high banking (by open-wheel standards; the 18-degree banking is modest by stock car standards).

==== Entry list ====
- (R) denotes rookie driver.
- (i) denotes driver who are ineligible for series driver points.

No.	Driver	Team	Manufacturer
00	Quin Houff (R)	StarCom Racing	Chevrolet
1	Kurt Busch	Chip Ganassi Racing	Chevrolet
2	Brad Keselowski	Team Penske	Ford
3	Austin Dillon	Richard Childress Racing	Chevrolet
4	Kevin Harvick	Stewart-Haas Racing	Ford
6	Ryan Newman	Roush Fenway Racing	Ford
7	Joey Gase (i)	Tommy Baldwin Racing	Chevrolet
8	Tyler Reddick (R)	Richard Childress Racing	Chevrolet
9	Chase Elliott	Hendrick Motorsports	Chevrolet
10	Aric Almirola	Stewart-Haas Racing	Ford
11	Denny Hamlin	Joe Gibbs Racing	Toyota
12	Ryan Blaney	Team Penske	Ford
13	Ty Dillon	Germain Racing	Chevrolet
14	Clint Bowyer	Stewart-Haas Racing	Ford
15	Brennan Poole (R)	Premium Motorsports	Chevrolet
17	Chris Buescher	Roush Fenway Racing	Ford
18	Kyle Busch	Joe Gibbs Racing	Toyota
19	Martin Truex Jr.	Joe Gibbs Racing	Toyota
20	Erik Jones	Joe Gibbs Racing	Toyota
21	Matt DiBenedetto	Wood Brothers Racing	Ford
22	Joey Logano	Team Penske	Ford
24	William Byron	Hendrick Motorsports	Chevrolet
27	J. J. Yeley (i)	Rick Ware Racing	Ford
32	Corey LaJoie	Go Fas Racing	Ford
34	Michael McDowell	Front Row Motorsports	Ford
37	Ryan Preece	JTG Daugherty Racing	Chevrolet
38	John Hunter Nemechek (R)	Front Row Motorsports	Ford
41	Cole Custer (R)	Stewart-Haas Racing	Ford
42	Matt Kenseth	Chip Ganassi Racing	Chevrolet
43	Bubba Wallace	Richard Petty Motorsports	Chevrolet
47	Ricky Stenhouse Jr.	JTG Daugherty Racing	Chevrolet
48	Jimmie Johnson	Hendrick Motorsports	Chevrolet
51	James Davison	Petty Ware Racing	Ford
53	Garrett Smithley (i)	Rick Ware Racing	Ford
66	Timmy Hill (i)	MBM Motorsports	Toyota
74	Reed Sorenson	Spire Motorsports	Chevrolet
88	Alex Bowman	Hendrick Motorsports	Chevrolet
95	Christopher Bell (R)	Leavine Family Racing	Toyota
96	Daniel Suárez	Gaunt Brothers Racing	Toyota
Official entry list

== Qualifying ==
Joey Logano was awarded the pole for the race as determined by a random draw.

=== Starting Lineup ===
Pos	No.	Driver	Team	Manufacturer
1	22	Joey Logano	Team Penske	Ford
2	11	Denny Hamlin	Joe Gibbs Racing	Toyota
3	4	Kevin Harvick	Stewart-Haas Racing	Ford
4	10	Aric Almirola	Stewart-Haas Racing	Ford
5	2	Brad Keselowski	Team Penske	Ford
6	88	Alex Bowman	Hendrick Motorsports	Chevrolet
7	18	Kyle Busch	Joe Gibbs Racing	Toyota
8	9	Chase Elliott	Hendrick Motorsports	Chevrolet
9	14	Clint Bowyer	Stewart-Haas Racing	Ford
10	1	Kurt Busch	Chip Ganassi Racing	Chevrolet
11	12	Ryan Blaney	Team Penske	Ford
12	19	Martin Truex Jr.	Joe Gibbs Racing	Toyota
13	6	Ryan Newman	Roush Fenway Racing	Ford
14	8	Tyler Reddick (R)	Richard Childress Racing	Chevrolet
15	21	Matt DiBenedetto	Wood Brothers Racing	Ford
16	41	Cole Custer (R)	Stewart-Haas Racing	Ford
17	48	Jimmie Johnson	Hendrick Motorsports	Chevrolet
18	3	Austin Dillon	Richard Childress Racing	Chevrolet
19	24	William Byron	Hendrick Motorsports	Chevrolet
20	42	Matt Kenseth	Chip Ganassi Racing	Chevrolet
21	34	Michael McDowell	Front Row Motorsports	Ford
22	17	Chris Buescher	Roush Fenway Racing	Ford
23	20	Erik Jones	Joe Gibbs Racing	Toyota
24	43	Bubba Wallace	Richard Petty Motorsports	Chevrolet
25	00	Quin Houff (R)	StarCom Racing	Chevrolet
26	27	J. J. Yeley (i)	Rick Ware Racing	Ford
27	15	Brennan Poole (R)	Premium Motorsports	Chevrolet
28	51	James Davison	Petty Ware Racing	Ford
29	95	Christopher Bell (R)	Leavine Family Racing	Toyota
30	74	Reed Sorenson	Spire Motorsports	Chevrolet
31	38	John Hunter Nemechek (R)	Front Row Motorsports	Ford
32	47	Ricky Stenhouse Jr.	JTG Daugherty Racing	Chevrolet
33	53	Garrett Smithley (i)	Rick Ware Racing	Ford
34	13	Ty Dillon	Germain Racing	Chevrolet
35	37	Ryan Preece	JTG Daugherty Racing	Chevrolet
36	32	Corey LaJoie	Go Fas Racing	Ford
37	96	Daniel Suárez	Gaunt Brothers Racing	Toyota
38	66	Timmy Hill (i)	MBM Motorsports	Toyota
39	7	Joey Gase (i)	Tommy Baldwin Racing	Chevrolet
Official starting lineup

== Race ==
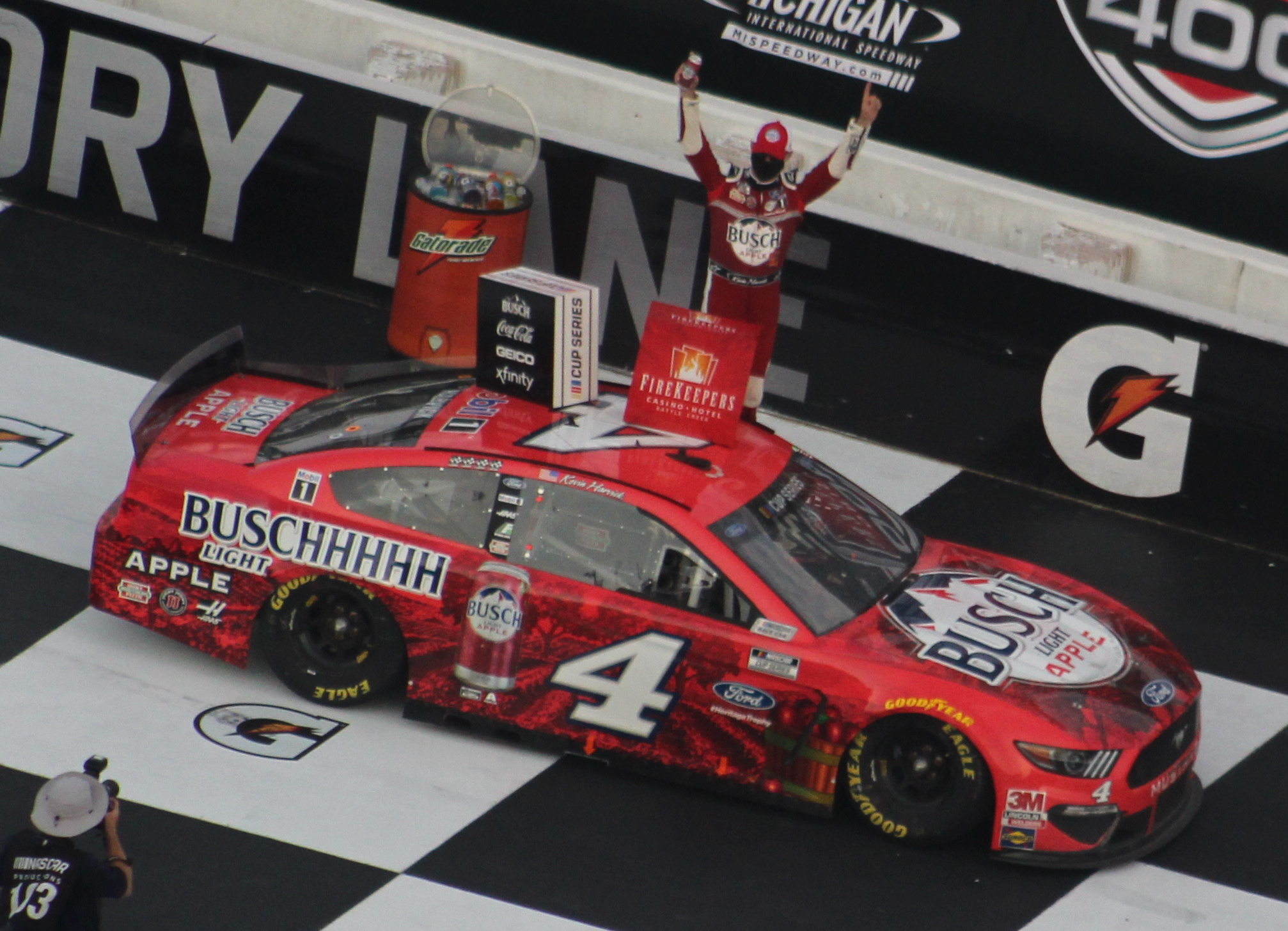
Kevin Harvick won the race.

=== Stage Results ===
Stage One Laps: 40

Pos	No	Driver	Team	Manufacturer	Points
1	4	Kevin Harvick	Stewart-Haas Racing	Ford	10
2	11	Denny Hamlin	Joe Gibbs Racing	Toyota	9
3	12	Ryan Blaney	Team Penske	Ford	8
4	1	Kurt Busch	Chip Ganassi Racing	Chevrolet	7
5	2	Brad Keselowski	Team Penske	Ford	6
6	20	Erik Jones	Joe Gibbs Racing	Toyota	5
7	88	Alex Bowman	Hendrick Motorsports	Chevrolet	4
8	9	Chase Elliott	Hendrick Motorsports	Chevrolet	3
9	18	Kyle Busch	Joe Gibbs Racing	Toyota	2
10	47	Ricky Stenhouse Jr.	JTG Daugherty Racing	Chevrolet	1
Official stage one results

Stage Two Laps: 45

Pos	No	Driver	Team	Manufacturer	Points
1	4	Kevin Harvick	Stewart-Haas Racing	Ford	10
2	12	Ryan Blaney	Team Penske	Ford	9
3	11	Denny Hamlin	Joe Gibbs Racing	Toyota	8
4	20	Erik Jones	Joe Gibbs Racing	Toyota	7
5	2	Brad Keselowski	Team Penske	Ford	6
6	18	Kyle Busch	Joe Gibbs Racing	Toyota	5
7	1	Kurt Busch	Chip Ganassi Racing	Chevrolet	4
8	88	Alex Bowman	Hendrick Motorsports	Chevrolet	3
9	14	Clint Bowyer	Stewart-Haas Racing	Ford	2
10	48	Jimmie Johnson	Hendrick Motorsports	Chevrolet	1
Official stage two results

=== Final Stage Results ===
Stage Three Laps: 71

Pos	Grid	No	Driver	Team	Manufacturer	Laps	Points
1	3	4	Kevin Harvick	Stewart-Haas Racing	Ford	161	60
2	5	2	Brad Keselowski	Team Penske	Ford	161	47
3	12	19	Martin Truex Jr.	Joe Gibbs Racing	Toyota	161	34
4	11	12	Ryan Blaney	Team Penske	Ford	161	50
5	7	18	Kyle Busch	Joe Gibbs Racing	Toyota	161	39
6	2	11	Denny Hamlin	Joe Gibbs Racing	Toyota	161	48
7	8	9	Chase Elliott	Hendrick Motorsports	Chevrolet	161	33
8	1	22	Joey Logano	Team Penske	Ford	161	29
9	24	43	Bubba Wallace	Richard Petty Motorsports	Chevrolet	161	28
10	10	1	Kurt Busch	Chip Ganassi Racing	Chevrolet	161	38
11	23	20	Erik Jones	Joe Gibbs Racing	Toyota	161	38
12	17	48	Jimmie Johnson	Hendrick Motorsports	Chevrolet	161	26
13	29	95	Christopher Bell (R)	Leavine Family Racing	Toyota	161	24
14	19	24	William Byron	Hendrick Motorsports	Chevrolet	161	23
15	15	21	Matt DiBenedetto	Wood Brothers Racing	Ford	161	22
16	4	10	Aric Almirola	Stewart-Haas Racing	Ford	161	21
17	20	42	Matt Kenseth	Chip Ganassi Racing	Chevrolet	161	20
18	14	8	Tyler Reddick (R)	Richard Childress Racing	Chevrolet	161	19
19	9	14	Clint Bowyer	Stewart-Haas Racing	Ford	161	20
20	22	17	Chris Buescher	Roush Fenway Racing	Ford	161	17
21	6	88	Alex Bowman	Hendrick Motorsports	Chevrolet	161	23
22	36	32	Corey LaJoie	Go Fas Racing	Ford	161	15
23	34	13	Ty Dillon	Germain Racing	Chevrolet	161	14
24	37	96	Daniel Suárez	Gaunt Brothers Racing	Toyota	161	13
25	35	37	Ryan Preece	JTG Daugherty Racing	Chevrolet	161	12
26	26	27	J. J. Yeley (i)	Rick Ware Racing	Ford	161	0
27	25	00	Quin Houff (R)	StarCom Racing	Chevrolet	161	10
28	13	6	Ryan Newman	Roush Fenway Racing	Ford	161	9
29	21	34	Michael McDowell	Front Row Motorsports	Ford	161	8
30	30	74	Reed Sorenson	Spire Motorsports	Chevrolet	161	7
31	18	3	Austin Dillon	Richard Childress Racing	Chevrolet	161	6
32	32	47	Ricky Stenhouse Jr.	JTG Daugherty Racing	Chevrolet	161	6
33	38	66	Timmy Hill (i)	MBM Motorsports	Toyota	159	0
34	16	41	Cole Custer (R)	Stewart-Haas Racing	Ford	148	3
35	33	53	Garrett Smithley (i)	Rick Ware Racing	Ford	141	0
36	31	38	John Hunter Nemechek (R)	Front Row Motorsports	Ford	127	1
37	27	15	Brennan Poole (R)	Premium Motorsports	Chevrolet	125	1
38	28	51	James Davison	Petty Ware Racing	Ford	103	1
39	39	7	Joey Gase (i)	Tommy Baldwin Racing	Chevrolet	68	0
Official race results

=== Race statistics ===
- Lead changes: 12 among 7 different drivers
- Cautions/Laps: 9 for 43
- Red flags: 1 for 5 minutes and 45 seconds
- Time of race: 2 hours, 34 minutes and 55 seconds
- Average speed: 124.712 miles per hour (200.705 km/h)

== Media ==
=== Television ===
NBC Sports covered the race on the television side. Rick Allen, Jeff Burton, Steve Letarte and two-time Michigan winner, Dale Earnhardt Jr. covered the race from the booth at Charlotte Motor Speedway. Marty Snider and Kelli Stavast handled the pit road duties on site.

NBCSN
Booth announcers	Pit reporters
Lap-by-lap: Rick Allen; Color-commentator: Jeff Burton; Color-commentator: Steve Letarte; Color-commentator: Dale Earnhardt Jr.	Marty Snider; Kelli Stavast

=== Radio ===
Radio coverage of the race was broadcast by Motor Racing Network (MRN) and simulcast on Sirius XM NASCAR Radio. Alex Hayden and Jeff Striegle called the race in the booth while the field is racing on the front stretch. Dave Moody called the race from a billboard outside of turn 2 when the field is racing through turns 1 and 2. Kyle Rickey called the race from a platform outside of turn 3 when the field races through turns 3 and 4. Winston Kelley and Kim Coon worked pit road for the radio side.

MRN
Booth announcers	Turn announcers	Pit reporters
Lead announcer: Alex Hayden; Announcer: Jeff Striegle	Turns 1 & 2: Dave Moody; Turns 3 & 4: Kyle Rickey	Winston Kelley; Kim Coon

== Standings after the race ==
Drivers' Championship standings

	Pos	Driver	Points
	1	Kevin Harvick	863
	2	Brad Keselowski	769 (–94)
	3	Denny Hamlin	736 (–127)
	4	Ryan Blaney	735 (–128)
	5	Chase Elliott	693 (–170)
	6	Joey Logano	682 (–181)
	7	Martin Truex Jr.	682 (–181)
	8	Aric Almirola	635 (–228)
	9	Kurt Busch	619 (–244)
	10	Kyle Busch	602 (–261)
	11	Alex Bowman	584 (–279)
	12	Clint Bowyer	532 (–331)
	13	Matt DiBenedetto	531 (–332)
	14	William Byron	507 (–356)
3	15	Erik Jones	491 (–372)
1	16	Tyler Reddick	488 (–375)
Official driver's standings

Manufacturers' Championship standings

Pos	Manufacturer	Points
1	Ford	788
2	Toyota	735 (–53)
3	Chevrolet	696 (–92)

- Note: Only the first 16 positions are included for the driver standings.
- . – Driver has clinched a position in the NASCAR Cup Series playoffs.

Previous race: 2020 Foxwoods Resort Casino 301	NASCAR Cup Series; 2020 season	Next race: 2020 Consumers Energy 400
