= 2020 Foxwoods Resort Casino 301 =

NASCAR Cup Series race

Race details
- Race 20 of 36 in the 2020 NASCAR Cup Series
- 2020 Foxwoods Resort Casino 301 program cover featuring Jimmie Johnson
- Date: August 2, 2020
- Location: New Hampshire Motor Speedway in Loudon, New Hampshire
- Course: Permanent racing facility
- Course length: 1.058 miles (1.703 km)
- Distance: 301 laps, 318.458 mi (512.603 km)
- Average speed: 100.372 miles per hour (161.533 km/h)

Pole position
Driver	Aric Almirola	Stewart-Haas Racing
- Grid positions set by ballot

Most laps led
Driver	Brad Keselowski	Team Penske
- Laps: 184

Winner
No. 2	Brad Keselowski	Team Penske

Television in the United States
- Network: NBCSN
- Announcers: Rick Allen, Jeff Burton, Steve Letarte and Dale Earnhardt Jr.
- Nielsen ratings: 2.210 million

Radio in the United States
- Radio: PRN
- Booth announcers: Doug Rice and Mark Garrow
- Turn announcers: Rob Albright (1 & 2) and Pat Patterson (3 & 4)

The 2020 Foxwoods Resort Casino 301 was a NASCAR Cup Series race held on August 2, 2020 at New Hampshire Motor Speedway in Loudon, New Hampshire. Originally scheduled for July 19, but postponed due to the COVID-19 pandemic. Contested over 301 laps on the 1.058-mile (1.703 km) speedway, it was the 20th race of the 2020 NASCAR Cup Series season.

== Report ==
=== Background ===
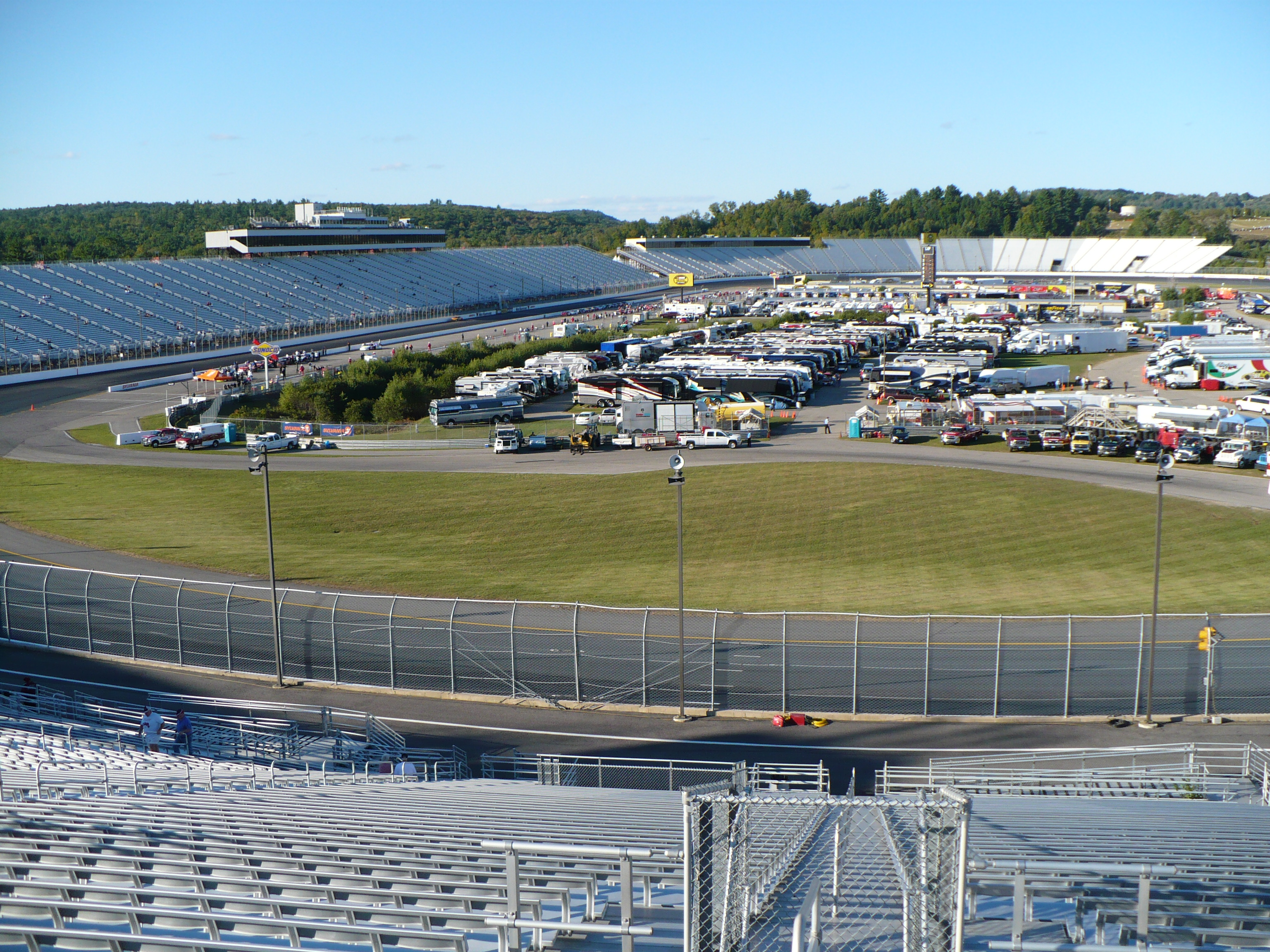
New Hampshire Motor Speedway, the track where the race was held.

New Hampshire Motor Speedway is a 1.058-mile (1.703 km) oval speedway located in Loudon, New Hampshire, which has hosted NASCAR racing annually since the early 1990s, as well as the longest-running motorcycle race in North America, the Loudon Classic. Nicknamed "The Magic Mile", the speedway is often converted into a 1.6-mile (2.6 km) road course, which includes much of the oval.

The track was originally the site of Bryar Motorsports Park before being purchased and redeveloped by Bob Bahre. The track is currently one of eight major NASCAR tracks owned and operated by Speedway Motorsports.

==== Entry list ====
- (R) denotes rookie driver.
- (i) denotes driver who are ineligible for series driver points.

No.	Driver	Team	Manufacturer
00	Quin Houff (R)	StarCom Racing	Chevrolet
1	Kurt Busch	Chip Ganassi Racing	Chevrolet
2	Brad Keselowski	Team Penske	Ford
3	Austin Dillon	Richard Childress Racing	Chevrolet
4	Kevin Harvick	Stewart-Haas Racing	Ford
6	Ryan Newman	Roush Fenway Racing	Ford
8	Tyler Reddick (R)	Richard Childress Racing	Chevrolet
9	Chase Elliott	Hendrick Motorsports	Chevrolet
10	Aric Almirola	Stewart-Haas Racing	Ford
11	Denny Hamlin	Joe Gibbs Racing	Toyota
12	Ryan Blaney	Team Penske	Ford
13	Ty Dillon	Germain Racing	Chevrolet
14	Clint Bowyer	Stewart-Haas Racing	Ford
15	Brennan Poole (R)	Premium Motorsports	Chevrolet
17	Chris Buescher	Roush Fenway Racing	Ford
18	Kyle Busch	Joe Gibbs Racing	Toyota
19	Martin Truex Jr.	Joe Gibbs Racing	Toyota
20	Erik Jones	Joe Gibbs Racing	Toyota
21	Matt DiBenedetto	Wood Brothers Racing	Ford
22	Joey Logano	Team Penske	Ford
24	William Byron	Hendrick Motorsports	Chevrolet
27	J. J. Yeley (i)	Rick Ware Racing	Ford
32	Corey LaJoie	Go Fas Racing	Ford
34	Michael McDowell	Front Row Motorsports	Ford
37	Ryan Preece	JTG Daugherty Racing	Chevrolet
38	John Hunter Nemechek (R)	Front Row Motorsports	Ford
41	Cole Custer (R)	Stewart-Haas Racing	Ford
42	Matt Kenseth	Chip Ganassi Racing	Chevrolet
43	Bubba Wallace	Richard Petty Motorsports	Chevrolet
47	Ricky Stenhouse Jr.	JTG Daugherty Racing	Chevrolet
48	Jimmie Johnson	Hendrick Motorsports	Chevrolet
51	Joey Gase (i)	Petty Ware Racing	Ford
53	James Davison	Rick Ware Racing	Chevrolet
66	Timmy Hill (i)	MBM Motorsports	Toyota
77	Garrett Smithley (i)	Spire Motorsports	Chevrolet
88	Alex Bowman	Hendrick Motorsports	Chevrolet
95	Christopher Bell (R)	Leavine Family Racing	Toyota
96	Daniel Suárez	Gaunt Brothers Racing	Toyota
Official entry list

== Qualifying ==
Aric Almirola was awarded the pole for the race as determined by a random draw.

=== Starting Lineup ===
Pos	No.	Driver	Team	Manufacturer
1	10	Aric Almirola	Stewart-Haas Racing	Ford
2	11	Denny Hamlin	Joe Gibbs Racing	Toyota
3	9	Chase Elliott	Hendrick Motorsports	Chevrolet
4	2	Brad Keselowski	Team Penske	Ford
5	18	Kyle Busch	Joe Gibbs Racing	Toyota
6	14	Clint Bowyer	Stewart-Haas Racing	Ford
7	4	Kevin Harvick	Stewart-Haas Racing	Ford
8	88	Alex Bowman	Hendrick Motorsports	Chevrolet
9	22	Joey Logano	Team Penske	Ford
10	1	Kurt Busch	Chip Ganassi Racing	Chevrolet
11	19	Martin Truex Jr.	Joe Gibbs Racing	Toyota
12	12	Ryan Blaney	Team Penske	Ford
13	8	Tyler Reddick (R)	Richard Childress Racing	Chevrolet
14	41	Cole Custer (R)	Stewart-Haas Racing	Ford
15	43	Bubba Wallace	Richard Petty Motorsports	Chevrolet
16	24	William Byron	Hendrick Motorsports	Chevrolet
17	20	Erik Jones	Joe Gibbs Racing	Toyota
18	34	Michael McDowell	Front Row Motorsports	Ford
19	21	Matt DiBenedetto	Wood Brothers Racing	Ford
20	48	Jimmie Johnson	Hendrick Motorsports	Chevrolet
21	42	Matt Kenseth	Chip Ganassi Racing	Chevrolet
22	6	Ryan Newman	Roush Fenway Racing	Ford
23	3	Austin Dillon	Richard Childress Racing	Chevrolet
24	17	Chris Buescher	Roush Fenway Racing	Ford
25	13	Ty Dillon	Germain Racing	Chevrolet
26	53	James Davison	Rick Ware Racing	Chevrolet
27	77	Garrett Smithley (i)	Spire Motorsports	Chevrolet
28	51	Joey Gase (i)	Petty Ware Racing	Ford
29	27	J. J. Yeley (i)	Rick Ware Racing	Ford
30	37	Ryan Preece	JTG Daugherty Racing	Chevrolet
31	47	Ricky Stenhouse Jr.	JTG Daugherty Racing	Chevrolet
32	00	Quin Houff (R)	StarCom Racing	Chevrolet
33	32	Corey LaJoie	Go Fas Racing	Ford
34	15	Brennan Poole (R)	Premium Motorsports	Chevrolet
35	95	Christopher Bell (R)	Leavine Family Racing	Toyota
36	38	John Hunter Nemechek (R)	Front Row Motorsports	Ford
37	96	Daniel Suárez	Gaunt Brothers Racing	Toyota
38	66	Timmy Hill (i)	MBM Motorsports	Toyota
Official starting lineup

== Race ==
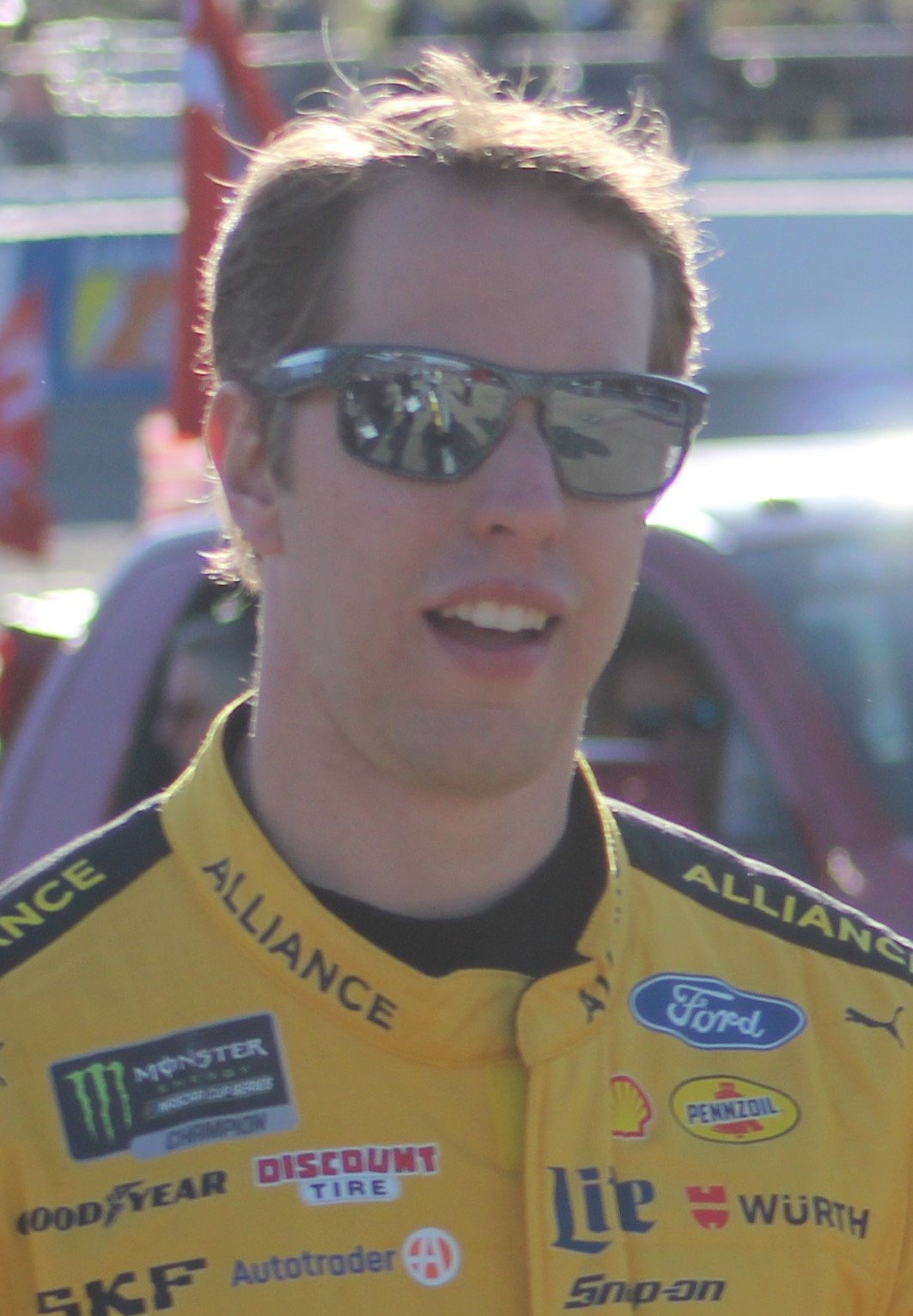
Brad Keselowski won the race.

=== Stage Results ===
Stage One Laps: 75

Pos	No	Driver	Team	Manufacturer	Points
1	11	Denny Hamlin	Joe Gibbs Racing	Toyota	10
2	19	Martin Truex Jr.	Joe Gibbs Racing	Toyota	9
3	4	Kevin Harvick	Stewart-Haas Racing	Ford	8
4	95	Christopher Bell (R)	Leavine Family Racing	Toyota	7
5	2	Brad Keselowski	Team Penske	Ford	6
6	12	Ryan Blaney	Team Penske	Ford	5
7	14	Clint Bowyer	Stewart-Haas Racing	Ford	4
8	22	Joey Logano	Team Penske	Ford	3
9	37	Ryan Preece	JTG Daugherty Racing	Chevrolet	2
10	10	Aric Almirola	Stewart-Haas Racing	Ford	1
Official stage one results

Stage Two Laps: 110

Pos	No	Driver	Team	Manufacturer	Points
1	2	Brad Keselowski	Team Penske	Ford	10
2	11	Denny Hamlin	Joe Gibbs Racing	Toyota	9
3	22	Joey Logano	Team Penske	Ford	8
4	10	Aric Almirola	Stewart-Haas Racing	Ford	7
5	24	William Byron	Hendrick Motorsports	Chevrolet	6
6	14	Clint Bowyer	Stewart-Haas Racing	Ford	5
7	3	Austin Dillon	Richard Childress Racing	Chevrolet	4
8	19	Martin Truex Jr.	Joe Gibbs Racing	Toyota	3
9	9	Chase Elliott	Hendrick Motorsports	Chevrolet	2
10	21	Matt DiBenedetto	Wood Brothers Racing	Ford	1
Official stage two results

=== Final Stage Results ===
Stage Three Laps: 116

Pos	Grid	No	Driver	Team	Manufacturer	Laps	Points
1	4	2	Brad Keselowski	Team Penske	Ford	301	56
2	2	11	Denny Hamlin	Joe Gibbs Racing	Toyota	301	54
3	11	19	Martin Truex Jr.	Joe Gibbs Racing	Toyota	301	46
4	9	22	Joey Logano	Team Penske	Ford	301	44
5	7	4	Kevin Harvick	Stewart-Haas Racing	Ford	301	40
6	19	21	Matt DiBenedetto	Wood Brothers Racing	Ford	301	32
7	1	10	Aric Almirola	Stewart-Haas Racing	Ford	301	38
8	14	41	Cole Custer (R)	Stewart-Haas Racing	Ford	301	29
9	3	9	Chase Elliott	Hendrick Motorsports	Chevrolet	301	30
10	13	8	Tyler Reddick (R)	Richard Childress Racing	Chevrolet	301	27
11	16	24	William Byron	Hendrick Motorsports	Chevrolet	301	32
12	20	48	Jimmie Johnson	Hendrick Motorsports	Chevrolet	301	25
13	23	3	Austin Dillon	Richard Childress Racing	Chevrolet	301	28
14	31	47	Ricky Stenhouse Jr.	JTG Daugherty Racing	Chevrolet	301	23
15	8	88	Alex Bowman	Hendrick Motorsports	Chevrolet	301	22
16	30	37	Ryan Preece	JTG Daugherty Racing	Chevrolet	301	23
17	10	1	Kurt Busch	Chip Ganassi Racing	Chevrolet	301	20
18	6	14	Clint Bowyer	Stewart-Haas Racing	Ford	301	28
19	18	34	Michael McDowell	Front Row Motorsports	Ford	301	18
20	12	12	Ryan Blaney	Team Penske	Ford	301	22
21	22	6	Ryan Newman	Roush Fenway Racing	Ford	300	16
22	25	13	Ty Dillon	Germain Racing	Chevrolet	300	15
23	15	43	Bubba Wallace	Richard Petty Motorsports	Chevrolet	300	14
24	17	20	Erik Jones	Joe Gibbs Racing	Toyota	300	13
25	24	17	Chris Buescher	Roush Fenway Racing	Ford	300	12
26	37	96	Daniel Suárez	Gaunt Brothers Racing	Toyota	299	11
27	34	15	Brennan Poole (R)	Premium Motorsports	Chevrolet	299	10
28	35	95	Christopher Bell (R)	Leavine Family Racing	Toyota	299	16
29	29	27	J. J. Yeley (i)	Rick Ware Racing	Ford	299	0
30	26	53	James Davison	Rick Ware Racing	Chevrolet	298	7
31	27	77	Garrett Smithley (i)	Spire Motorsports	Chevrolet	295	0
32	32	00	Quin Houff (R)	StarCom Racing	Chevrolet	294	5
33	38	66	Timmy Hill (i)	MBM Motorsports	Toyota	294	0
34	28	51	Joey Gase (i)	Petty Ware Racing	Ford	293	0
35	33	32	Corey LaJoie	Go Fas Racing	Ford	262	2
36	36	38	John Hunter Nemechek (R)	Front Row Motorsports	Ford	212	1
37	21	42	Matt Kenseth	Chip Ganassi Racing	Chevrolet	203	1
38	5	18	Kyle Busch	Joe Gibbs Racing	Toyota	15	1
Official race results

=== Race statistics ===
- Lead changes: 22 among 7 different drivers
- Cautions/Laps: 11 for 52
- Red flags: 0
- Time of race: 3 hours, 10 minutes and 22 seconds
- Average speed: 100.372 miles per hour (161.533 km/h)

== Media ==
=== Television ===
NBC Sports covered the race on the television side. Rick Allen, four-time and all-time Loudon winner Jeff Burton, Steve Letarte and Dale Earnhardt Jr. covered the race from the booth at Charlotte Motor Speedway. Parker Kligerman and Marty Snider handled the pit road duties on site, and Rutledge Wood handled the features from his home during the race.

NBCSN
Booth announcers	Pit reporters	Features reporter
Lap-by-lap: Rick Allen; Color-commentator: Jeff Burton; Color-commentator: Steve Letarte; Color-commentator: Dale Earnhardt Jr.	Parker Kligerman; Marty Snider	Rutledge Wood

=== Radio ===
PRN had the radio call for the race, which was also simulcast on Sirius XM NASCAR Radio. Doug Rice and Mark Garrow called the race from the booth when the field races down the frontstretch. Rob Albright called the race from turns 1 & 2 and Pat Patterson called the race from turns 3 & 4. Brad Gillie and Jim Noble handled the duties on pit lane.

PRN
Booth announcers	Turn announcers	Pit reporters
Lead announcer: Doug Rice; Announcer: Mark Garrow	Turns 1 & 2: Rob Albright; Turns 3 & 4: Pat Patterson	Brad Gillie; Jim Noble

== Standings after the race ==
Drivers' Championship standings

	Pos	Driver	Points
	1	Kevin Harvick	803
	2	Brad Keselowski	722 (–81)
1	3	Denny Hamlin	688 (–115)
1	4	Ryan Blaney	685 (–118)
	5	Chase Elliott	660 (–143)
	6	Joey Logano	653 (–150)
	7	Martin Truex Jr.	648 (–155)
	8	Aric Almirola	614 (–189)
1	9	Kurt Busch	581 (–222)
1	10	Kyle Busch	563 (–240)
	11	Alex Bowman	561 (–242)
	12	Clint Bowyer	512 (–291)
	13	Matt DiBenedetto	509 (–294)
	14	William Byron	484 (–319)
	15	Tyler Reddick	469 (–334)
1	16	Austin Dillon	466 (–337)
Official driver's standings

Manufacturers' Championship standings

Pos	Manufacturer	Points
1	Ford	748
2	Toyota	701 (–47)
3	Chevrolet	666 (–82)

- Note: Only the first 16 positions are included for the driver standings.
- . – Driver has clinched a position in the NASCAR Cup Series playoffs.

Previous race: 2020 Super Start Batteries 400	NASCAR Cup Series; 2020 season	Next race: 2020 FireKeepers Casino 400
