= 2021 Explore the Pocono Mountains 350 =

NASCAR Cup Series race

Race details
- Race 19 of 36 in the 2021 NASCAR Cup Series
- Date: June 27, 2021
- Location: Pocono Raceway in Long Pond, Pennsylvania
- Course: Permanent racing facility
- Course length: 2.5 miles (4 km)
- Distance: 140 laps, 350 mi (563 km)
- Average speed: 143.036 miles per hour (230.194 km/h)

Pole position
Driver	Chris Buescher	Roush Fenway Racing
- Grid positions set by partial inversion of previous race's finishing order

Most laps led
Driver	Brad Keselowski	Team Penske
- Laps: 31

Winner
No. 18	Kyle Busch	Joe Gibbs Racing

Television in the United States
- Network: NBCSN
- Announcers: Rick Allen, Jeff Burton, Steve Letarte and Dale Earnhardt Jr.
- Nielsen ratings: 1.49/2.446 million

Radio in the United States
- Radio: MRN
- Booth announcers: Alex Hayden and Jeff Striegle
- Turn announcers: Dave Moody (1), Mike Bagley (2) and Kyle Rickey (3)

The 2021 Explore the Pocono Mountains 350 was a NASCAR Cup Series race held on June 27, 2021, at Pocono Raceway in Long Pond, Pennsylvania. Contested over 140 laps on the 2.5-mile (4.0 km) triangular racecourse, it was the 19th race of the 2021 NASCAR Cup Series season.

== Entry list ==
- (R) denotes rookie driver.
- (i) denotes driver who are ineligible for series driver points.

No.	Driver	Team	Manufacturer
00	Quin Houff	StarCom Racing	Chevrolet
1	Kurt Busch	Chip Ganassi Racing	Chevrolet
2	Brad Keselowski	Team Penske	Ford
3	Austin Dillon	Richard Childress Racing	Chevrolet
4	Kevin Harvick	Stewart-Haas Racing	Ford
5	Kyle Larson	Hendrick Motorsports	Chevrolet
6	Ryan Newman	Roush Fenway Racing	Ford
7	Corey LaJoie	Spire Motorsports	Chevrolet
8	Tyler Reddick	Richard Childress Racing	Chevrolet
9	Chase Elliott	Hendrick Motorsports	Chevrolet
10	Aric Almirola	Stewart-Haas Racing	Ford
11	Denny Hamlin	Joe Gibbs Racing	Toyota
12	Ryan Blaney	Team Penske	Ford
14	Chase Briscoe (R)	Stewart-Haas Racing	Ford
15	James Davison	Rick Ware Racing	Chevrolet
17	Chris Buescher	Roush Fenway Racing	Ford
18	Kyle Busch	Joe Gibbs Racing	Toyota
19	Martin Truex Jr.	Joe Gibbs Racing	Toyota
20	Christopher Bell	Joe Gibbs Racing	Toyota
21	Matt DiBenedetto	Wood Brothers Racing	Ford
22	Joey Logano	Team Penske	Ford
23	Bubba Wallace	23XI Racing	Toyota
24	William Byron	Hendrick Motorsports	Chevrolet
34	Michael McDowell	Front Row Motorsports	Ford
37	Ryan Preece	JTG Daugherty Racing	Chevrolet
38	Anthony Alfredo (R)	Front Row Motorsports	Ford
41	Cole Custer	Stewart-Haas Racing	Ford
42	Ross Chastain	Chip Ganassi Racing	Chevrolet
43	Erik Jones	Richard Petty Motorsports	Chevrolet
47	Ricky Stenhouse Jr.	JTG Daugherty Racing	Chevrolet
48	Alex Bowman	Hendrick Motorsports	Chevrolet
51	Cody Ware (i)	Petty Ware Racing	Chevrolet
52	Josh Bilicki	Rick Ware Racing	Ford
53	Garrett Smithley (i)	Rick Ware Racing	Chevrolet
66	Timmy Hill (i)	MBM Motorsports	Toyota
77	Justin Allgaier (i)	Spire Motorsports	Chevrolet
78	B. J. McLeod (i)	Live Fast Motorsports	Ford
99	Daniel Suárez	Trackhouse Racing Team	Chevrolet
Official entry list

== Qualifying ==
Chris Buescher was awarded the pole for the race as determined by the top 20 from Saturday's finishing order inverted.

=== Starting Lineup ===
Pos	No.	Driver	Team	Manufacturer
1	17	Chris Buescher	Roush Fenway Racing	Ford
2	34	Michael McDowell	Front Row Motorsports	Ford
3	19	Martin Truex Jr.	Joe Gibbs Racing	Toyota
4	20	Christopher Bell	Joe Gibbs Racing	Toyota
5	10	Aric Almirola	Stewart-Haas Racing	Ford
6	47	Ricky Stenhouse Jr.	JTG Daugherty Racing	Chevrolet
7	23	Bubba Wallace	23XI Racing	Toyota
8	99	Daniel Suárez	Trackhouse Racing Team	Chevrolet
9	9	Chase Elliott	Hendrick Motorsports	Chevrolet
10	8	Tyler Reddick	Richard Childress Racing	Chevrolet
11	2	Brad Keselowski	Team Penske	Ford
12	5	Kyle Larson	Hendrick Motorsports	Chevrolet
13	4	Kevin Harvick	Stewart-Haas Racing	Ford
14	22	Joey Logano	Team Penske	Ford
15	1	Kurt Busch	Chip Ganassi Racing	Chevrolet
16	12	Ryan Blaney	Team Penske	Ford
17	11	Denny Hamlin	Joe Gibbs Racing	Toyota
18	24	William Byron	Hendrick Motorsports	Chevrolet
19	18	Kyle Busch	Joe Gibbs Racing	Toyota
20	48	Alex Bowman	Hendrick Motorsports	Chevrolet
21	3	Austin Dillon	Richard Childress Racing	Chevrolet
22	43	Erik Jones	Richard Petty Motorsports	Chevrolet
23	37	Ryan Preece	JTG Daugherty Racing	Chevrolet
24	14	Chase Briscoe (R)	Stewart-Haas Racing	Ford
25	51	Cody Ware (i)	Petty Ware Racing	Chevrolet
26	38	Anthony Alfredo (R)	Front Row Motorsports	Ford
27	77	Justin Allgaier (i)	Spire Motorsports	Chevrolet
28	15	James Davison	Rick Ware Racing	Chevrolet
29	53	Garrett Smithley (i)	Rick Ware Racing	Chevrolet
30	78	B. J. McLeod (i)	Live Fast Motorsports	Ford
31	00	Quin Houff	StarCom Racing	Chevrolet
32	21	Matt DiBenedetto	Wood Brothers Racing	Ford
33	42	Ross Chastain	Chip Ganassi Racing	Chevrolet
34	52	Josh Bilicki	Rick Ware Racing	Ford
35	66	Timmy Hill (i)	MBM Motorsports	Toyota
36	7	Corey LaJoie	Spire Motorsports	Chevrolet
37	6	Ryan Newman	Roush Fenway Racing	Ford
38	41	Cole Custer	Stewart-Haas Racing	Ford
Official starting lineup

== Race ==
=== Stage Results ===
Stage One Laps: 30

Pos	No	Driver	Team	Manufacturer	Points
1	19	Martin Truex Jr.	Joe Gibbs Racing	Toyota	10
2	10	Aric Almirola	Stewart-Haas Racing	Ford	9
3	2	Brad Keselowski	Team Penske	Ford	8
4	12	Ryan Blaney	Team Penske	Ford	7
5	23	Bubba Wallace	23XI Racing	Toyota	6
6	34	Michael McDowell	Front Row Motorsports	Ford	5
7	47	Ricky Stenhouse Jr.	JTG Daugherty Racing	Chevrolet	4
8	8	Tyler Reddick	Richard Childress Racing	Chevrolet	3
9	99	Daniel Suárez	Trackhouse Racing Team	Chevrolet	2
10	22	Joey Logano	Team Penske	Ford	1
Official stage one results

Stage Two Laps: 55

Pos	No	Driver	Team	Manufacturer	Points
1	24	William Byron	Hendrick Motorsports	Chevrolet	10
2	11	Denny Hamlin	Joe Gibbs Racing	Toyota	9
3	2	Brad Keselowski	Team Penske	Ford	8
4	20	Christopher Bell	Joe Gibbs Racing	Toyota	7
5	9	Chase Elliott	Hendrick Motorsports	Chevrolet	6
6	19	Martin Truex Jr.	Joe Gibbs Racing	Toyota	5
7	18	Kyle Busch	Joe Gibbs Racing	Toyota	4
8	5	Kyle Larson	Hendrick Motorsports	Chevrolet	3
9	10	Aric Almirola	Stewart-Haas Racing	Ford	2
10	42	Ross Chastain	Chip Ganassi Racing	Chevrolet	1
Official stage two results

=== Final Stage Recap And Results ===
Before the final stage break at lap 74's pit stop it was discovered that Kyle Busch got stuck in 4th gear. During the stage break pit stop his team discovered he had lost his clutch so he was forced to leave it in 4th gear for the remainder of the race. With one lap before the restart he topped off on fuel, gambling that there would be no further caution flags to the end, however there was one final caution on lap 94 for debris with the final restart on lap 96. This led to a 44 lap green flag run. Kyle Busch was able to get enough good fuel milage to win the race, passing the leader, teammate Denny Hamlin who was coming to pit lane for fuel as they were about to take the white flag.

Stage Three Laps: 55

Pos	Grid	No	Driver	Team	Manufacturer	Laps	Points
1	19	18	Kyle Busch	Joe Gibbs Racing	Toyota	140	44
2	12	5	Kyle Larson	Hendrick Motorsports	Chevrolet	140	38
3	11	2	Brad Keselowski	Team Penske	Ford	140	50
4	13	4	Kevin Harvick	Stewart-Haas Racing	Ford	140	33
5	7	23	Bubba Wallace	23XI Racing	Toyota	140	38
6	16	12	Ryan Blaney	Team Penske	Ford	140	38
7	20	48	Alex Bowman	Hendrick Motorsports	Chevrolet	140	30
8	23	37	Ryan Preece	JTG Daugherty Racing	Chevrolet	140	29
9	10	8	Tyler Reddick	Richard Childress Racing	Chevrolet	140	31
10	14	22	Joey Logano	Team Penske	Ford	140	28
11	3	19	Martin Truex Jr.	Joe Gibbs Racing	Toyota	140	41
12	18	24	William Byron	Hendrick Motorsports	Chevrolet	140	35
13	21	3	Austin Dillon	Richard Childress Racing	Chevrolet	140	24
14	17	11	Denny Hamlin	Joe Gibbs Racing	Toyota	140	32
15	8	99	Daniel Suárez	Trackhouse Racing Team	Chevrolet	140	24
16	5	10	Aric Almirola	Stewart-Haas Racing	Ford	140	32
17	2	34	Michael McDowell	Front Row Motorsports	Ford	140	25
18	32	21	Matt DiBenedetto	Wood Brothers Racing	Ford	140	19
19	1	17	Chris Buescher	Roush Fenway Racing	Ford	140	18
20	15	1	Kurt Busch	Chip Ganassi Racing	Chevrolet	140	17
21	24	14	Chase Briscoe (R)	Stewart-Haas Racing	Ford	140	16
22	37	6	Ryan Newman	Roush Fenway Racing	Ford	140	15
23	36	7	Corey LaJoie	Spire Motorsports	Chevrolet	139	14
24	38	41	Cole Custer	Stewart-Haas Racing	Ford	139	13
25	27	77	Justin Allgaier (i)	Spire Motorsports	Chevrolet	139	0
26	33	42	Ross Chastain	Chip Ganassi Racing	Chevrolet	139	12
27	9	9	Chase Elliott	Hendrick Motorsports	Chevrolet	139	16
28	25	51	Cody Ware (i)	Petty Ware Racing	Chevrolet	139	0
29	30	78	B. J. McLeod (i)	Live Fast Motorsports	Ford	138	0
30	28	15	James Davison	Rick Ware Racing	Chevrolet	137	7
31	22	43	Erik Jones	Richard Petty Motorsports	Chevrolet	136	6
32	4	20	Christopher Bell	Joe Gibbs Racing	Toyota	135	12
33	31	00	Quin Houff	StarCom Racing	Chevrolet	135	4
34	26	38	Anthony Alfredo (R)	Front Row Motorsports	Ford	134	3
35	34	52	Josh Bilicki	Rick Ware Racing	Ford	132	2
36	29	53	Garrett Smithley (i)	Rick Ware Racing	Chevrolet	122	0
37	35	66	Timmy Hill (i)	MBM Motorsports	Toyota	113	0
38	6	47	Ricky Stenhouse Jr.	JTG Daugherty Racing	Chevrolet	111	5
Official race results

=== Race statistics ===
- Lead changes: 12 among 10 different drivers
- Cautions/Laps: 4 for 15
- Red flags: 0
- Time of race: 2 hours, 26 minutes and 49 seconds
- Average speed: 143.036 miles per hour (230.194 km/h)

== Media ==
=== Television ===
NBC Sports covered the race on the television side. Rick Allen, Jeff Burton, Steve Letarte and Dale Earnhardt Jr. called the race from the broadcast booth. Dave Burns, Marty Snider and Kelli Stavast handled the pit road duties from pit lane. Jac Collinsworth handled the features from the track.

NBCSN
Booth announcers	Pit reporters	Features reporter
Lap-by-lap: Rick Allen; Color-commentator: Jeff Burton; Color-commentator: Steve Letarte; Color-commentator: Dale Earnhardt Jr.	Dave Burns; Marty Snider; Kelli Stavast	Jac Collinsworth

=== Radio ===
MRN had the radio call for the race which was also simulcast on Sirius XM NASCAR Radio. Alex Hayden and Jeff Striegle called the race in the booth when the field raced through the tri-oval. Dave Moody called the race from the Sunoco spotters stand outside turn 2 when the field raced through turns 1 and 2. Mike Bagley called the race from a platform inside the backstretch when the field raced down the backstretch. Kyle Rickey called the race from the Sunoco spotters stand outside turn 4 when the field raced through turns 3 and 4. Steve Post and Kim Coon worked pit road for the radio side.

MRN Radio
Booth announcers	Turn announcers	Pit reporters
Lead announcer: Alex Hayden; Announcer: Jeff Striegle	Turns 1 & 2: Dave Moody; Backstretch: Mike Bagley; Turns 3 & 4: Kyle Rickey	Steve Post; Kim Coon

== Standings after the race ==
Drivers' Championship standings

	Pos	Driver	Points
	1	Denny Hamlin	761
	2	Kyle Larson	759 (–2)
	3	William Byron	690 (–71)
	4	Joey Logano	651 (–111)
1	5	Kyle Busch	650 (–112)
1	6	Chase Elliott	633 (–128)
	7	Martin Truex Jr.	606 (–155)
1	8	Ryan Blaney	586 (–175)
1	9	Kevin Harvick	585 (–176)
	10	Brad Keselowski	569 (–192)
	11	Alex Bowman	543 (–218)
	12	Austin Dillon	518 (–243)
	13	Tyler Reddick	470 (–291)
	14	Kurt Busch	430 (–331)
1	15	Chris Buescher	427 (–334)
1	16	Christopher Bell	424 (–337)
Official driver's standings

Manufacturers' Championship standings

Pos	Manufacturer	Points
1	Chevrolet	702
2	Ford	655 (–47)
3	Toyota	650 (–52)

- Note: Only the first 16 positions are included for the driver standings.
- . – Driver has clinched a position in the NASCAR Cup Series playoffs.

Previous race: 2021 Pocono Organics CBD 325	NASCAR Cup Series; 2021 season	Next race: 2021 Jockey Made in America 250
