= 2020 Consumers Energy 400 =

NASCAR Cup Series race

Race details
- Race 22 of 36 in the 2020 NASCAR Cup Series
- 2020 Consumers Energy 400 program cover
- Date: August 9, 2020
- Location: Michigan International Speedway in Brooklyn, Michigan
- Course: Permanent racing facility
- Course length: 2.0 miles (3.2 km)
- Distance: 156 laps, 312 mi (502.008 km)
- Average speed: 144.463 miles per hour (232.491 km/h)

Pole position
Driver	Chris Buescher	Roush Fenway Racing
- Grid positions set by partial inversion of previous race's finishing order

Most laps led
Driver	Kevin Harvick	Stewart-Haas Racing
- Laps: 90

Winner
No. 4	Kevin Harvick	Stewart-Haas Racing

Television in the United States
- Network: NBCSN
- Announcers: Rick Allen, Jeff Burton, Steve Letarte and Dale Earnhardt Jr.
- Nielsen ratings: 2.371 million

Radio in the United States
- Radio: MRN
- Booth announcers: Alex Hayden and Jeff Striegle
- Turn announcers: Dave Moody (1–2) and Kyle Rickey (3–4)

The 2020 Consumers Energy 400 was a NASCAR Cup Series race held on August 9, 2020, and was held over 500 kilometers (312 miles), shortened by 44 laps from the original distance because of modified NASCAR rules for doubleheader races, one of three Cup Series events to be run under the doubleheader format; however, the race retained the original 400-mile name. It was the 22nd race of the 2020 NASCAR Cup Series season.

During both Michigan races that season Reed Sorenson ran a special #74 Fake Steak sponsored car fielded by Spire Motorsports that was used to gather footage that was used in the 2021 Netflix sitcom The Crew. Despite being used for filming he was officially classified as being in the race and finished 31st.

This was the final time the Cup Series had a second race at Michigan, as the second race was dropped in 2021.

== Report ==
=== Background ===
Layout of Michigan International Speedway, the track where the race is held.

The race was held at Michigan International Speedway, a two-mile (3.2 km) moderate-banked D-shaped speedway located in Brooklyn, Michigan. The track is used primarily for NASCAR events. It is sometimes known as a "sister track" to Texas World Speedway, and was used as the basis of Auto Club Speedway. The track is owned by International Speedway Corporation. Michigan International Speedway is recognized as one of motorsports' premier facilities because of its wide racing surface and high banking (by open-wheel standards; the 18-degree banking is modest by stock car standards).

==== Entry list ====
- (R) denotes rookie driver.
- (i) denotes driver who are ineligible for series driver points.

No.	Driver	Team	Manufacturer
00	Quin Houff (R)	StarCom Racing	Chevrolet
1	Kurt Busch	Chip Ganassi Racing	Chevrolet
2	Brad Keselowski	Team Penske	Ford
3	Austin Dillon	Richard Childress Racing	Chevrolet
4	Kevin Harvick	Stewart-Haas Racing	Ford
6	Ryan Newman	Roush Fenway Racing	Ford
7	Josh Bilicki (i)	Tommy Baldwin Racing	Chevrolet
8	Tyler Reddick (R)	Richard Childress Racing	Chevrolet
9	Chase Elliott	Hendrick Motorsports	Chevrolet
10	Aric Almirola	Stewart-Haas Racing	Ford
11	Denny Hamlin	Joe Gibbs Racing	Toyota
12	Ryan Blaney	Team Penske	Ford
13	Ty Dillon	Germain Racing	Chevrolet
14	Clint Bowyer	Stewart-Haas Racing	Ford
15	Brennan Poole (R)	Premium Motorsports	Chevrolet
17	Chris Buescher	Roush Fenway Racing	Ford
18	Kyle Busch	Joe Gibbs Racing	Toyota
19	Martin Truex Jr.	Joe Gibbs Racing	Toyota
20	Erik Jones	Joe Gibbs Racing	Toyota
21	Matt DiBenedetto	Wood Brothers Racing	Ford
22	Joey Logano	Team Penske	Ford
24	William Byron	Hendrick Motorsports	Chevrolet
27	J. J. Yeley (i)	Rick Ware Racing	Ford
32	Corey LaJoie	Go Fas Racing	Ford
34	Michael McDowell	Front Row Motorsports	Ford
37	Ryan Preece	JTG Daugherty Racing	Chevrolet
38	John Hunter Nemechek (R)	Front Row Motorsports	Ford
41	Cole Custer (R)	Stewart-Haas Racing	Ford
42	Matt Kenseth	Chip Ganassi Racing	Chevrolet
43	Bubba Wallace	Richard Petty Motorsports	Chevrolet
47	Ricky Stenhouse Jr.	JTG Daugherty Racing	Chevrolet
48	Jimmie Johnson	Hendrick Motorsports	Chevrolet
51	James Davison	Petty Ware Racing	Ford
53	Garrett Smithley (i)	Rick Ware Racing	Ford
66	Timmy Hill (i)	MBM Motorsports	Toyota
74	Reed Sorenson	Spire Motorsports	Chevrolet
88	Alex Bowman	Hendrick Motorsports	Chevrolet
95	Christopher Bell (R)	Leavine Family Racing	Toyota
96	Daniel Suárez	Gaunt Brothers Racing	Toyota
Official entry list

== Qualifying ==
Chris Buescher was awarded the pole for the race as determined by the top 20 from Saturday's finishing order inverted.

=== Starting Lineup ===
Pos	No.	Driver	Team	Manufacturer
1	17	Chris Buescher	Roush Fenway Racing	Ford
2	14	Clint Bowyer	Stewart-Haas Racing	Ford
3	8	Tyler Reddick (R)	Richard Childress Racing	Chevrolet
4	42	Matt Kenseth	Chip Ganassi Racing	Chevrolet
5	10	Aric Almirola	Stewart-Haas Racing	Ford
6	21	Matt DiBenedetto	Wood Brothers Racing	Ford
7	24	William Byron	Hendrick Motorsports	Chevrolet
8	95	Christopher Bell (R)	Leavine Family Racing	Toyota
9	48	Jimmie Johnson	Hendrick Motorsports	Chevrolet
10	20	Erik Jones	Joe Gibbs Racing	Toyota
11	1	Kurt Busch	Chip Ganassi Racing	Chevrolet
12	43	Bubba Wallace	Richard Petty Motorsports	Chevrolet
13	22	Joey Logano	Team Penske	Ford
14	9	Chase Elliott	Hendrick Motorsports	Chevrolet
15	11	Denny Hamlin	Joe Gibbs Racing	Toyota
16	18	Kyle Busch	Joe Gibbs Racing	Toyota
17	12	Ryan Blaney	Team Penske	Ford
18	19	Martin Truex Jr.	Joe Gibbs Racing	Toyota
19	2	Brad Keselowski	Team Penske	Ford
20	4	Kevin Harvick	Stewart-Haas Racing	Ford
21	88	Alex Bowman	Hendrick Motorsports	Chevrolet
22	32	Corey LaJoie	Go Fas Racing	Ford
23	13	Ty Dillon	Germain Racing	Chevrolet
24	96	Daniel Suárez	Gaunt Brothers Racing	Toyota
25	37	Ryan Preece	JTG Daugherty Racing	Chevrolet
26	27	J. J. Yeley (i)	Rick Ware Racing	Ford
27	00	Quin Houff (R)	StarCom Racing	Chevrolet
28	6	Ryan Newman	Roush Fenway Racing	Ford
29	34	Michael McDowell	Front Row Motorsports	Ford
30	74	Reed Sorenson	Spire Motorsports	Chevrolet
31	3	Austin Dillon	Richard Childress Racing	Chevrolet
32	47	Ricky Stenhouse Jr.	JTG Daugherty Racing	Chevrolet
33	66	Timmy Hill (i)	MBM Motorsports	Toyota
34	41	Cole Custer (R)	Stewart-Haas Racing	Ford
35	53	Garrett Smithley (i)	Rick Ware Racing	Ford
36	38	John Hunter Nemechek (R)	Front Row Motorsports	Ford
37	15	Brennan Poole (R)	Premium Motorsports	Chevrolet
38	51	James Davison	Petty Ware Racing	Ford
39	7	Josh Bilicki (i)	Tommy Baldwin Racing	Chevrolet
Official starting lineup

== Race ==
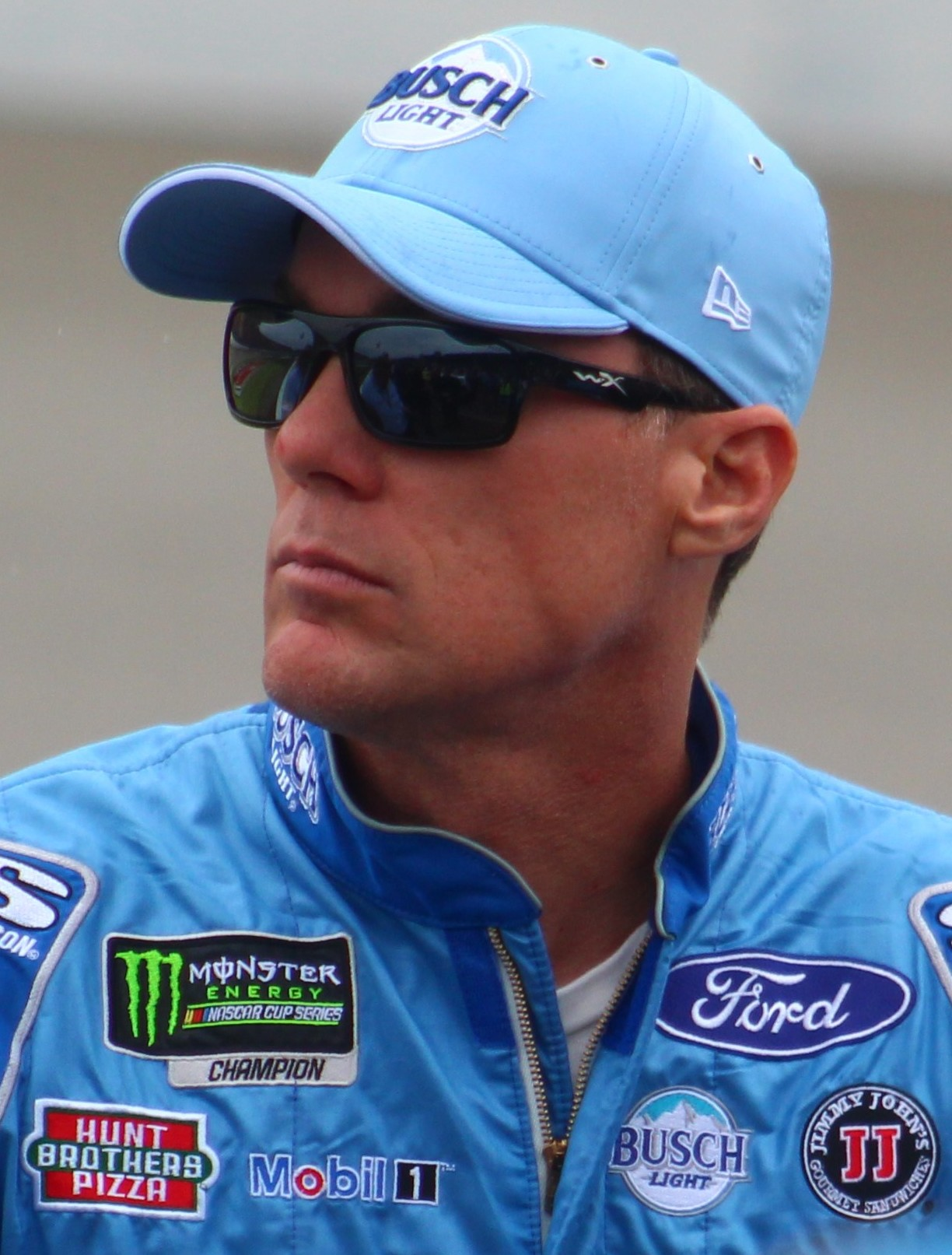
Kevin Harvick won the race.

=== Stage Results ===
Stage One Laps: 40

Pos	No	Driver	Team	Manufacturer	Points
1	14	Clint Bowyer	Stewart-Haas Racing	Ford	10
2	95	Christopher Bell (R)	Leavine Family Racing	Toyota	9
3	18	Kyle Busch	Joe Gibbs Racing	Toyota	8
4	21	Matt DiBenedetto	Wood Brothers Racing	Ford	7
5	20	Erik Jones	Joe Gibbs Racing	Toyota	6
6	24	William Byron	Hendrick Motorsports	Chevrolet	5
7	12	Ryan Blaney	Team Penske	Ford	4
8	4	Kevin Harvick	Stewart-Haas Racing	Ford	3
9	1	Kurt Busch	Chip Ganassi Racing	Chevrolet	2
10	22	Joey Logano	Team Penske	Ford	1
Official stage one results

Stage Two Laps: 45

Pos	No	Driver	Team	Manufacturer	Points
1	4	Kevin Harvick	Stewart-Haas Racing	Ford	10
2	2	Brad Keselowski	Team Penske	Ford	9
3	18	Kyle Busch	Joe Gibbs Racing	Toyota	8
4	95	Christopher Bell (R)	Leavine Family Racing	Toyota	7
5	14	Clint Bowyer	Stewart-Haas Racing	Ford	6
6	11	Denny Hamlin	Joe Gibbs Racing	Toyota	5
7	20	Erik Jones	Joe Gibbs Racing	Toyota	4
8	10	Aric Almirola	Stewart-Haas Racing	Ford	3
9	22	Joey Logano	Team Penske	Ford	2
10	12	Ryan Blaney	Team Penske	Ford	1
Official stage two results

=== Final Stage Results ===
Stage Three Laps: 71

Pos	Grid	No	Driver	Team	Manufacturer	Laps	Points
1	20	4	Kevin Harvick	Stewart-Haas Racing	Ford	156	53
2	15	11	Denny Hamlin	Joe Gibbs Racing	Toyota	156	40
3	18	19	Martin Truex Jr.	Joe Gibbs Racing	Toyota	156	34
4	16	18	Kyle Busch	Joe Gibbs Racing	Toyota	156	49
5	13	22	Joey Logano	Team Penske	Ford	156	35
6	5	10	Aric Almirola	Stewart-Haas Racing	Ford	156	34
7	6	21	Matt DiBenedetto	Wood Brothers Racing	Ford	156	37
8	31	3	Austin Dillon	Richard Childress Racing	Chevrolet	156	29
9	14	9	Chase Elliott	Hendrick Motorsports	Chevrolet	156	28
10	11	1	Kurt Busch	Chip Ganassi Racing	Chevrolet	156	29
11	9	48	Jimmie Johnson	Hendrick Motorsports	Chevrolet	156	26
12	7	24	William Byron	Hendrick Motorsports	Chevrolet	156	30
13	28	6	Ryan Newman	Roush Fenway Racing	Ford	156	24
14	2	14	Clint Bowyer	Stewart-Haas Racing	Ford	156	39
15	4	42	Matt Kenseth	Chip Ganassi Racing	Chevrolet	156	22
16	25	37	Ryan Preece	JTG Daugherty Racing	Chevrolet	156	21
17	8	95	Christopher Bell (R)	Leavine Family Racing	Toyota	156	36
18	23	13	Ty Dillon	Germain Racing	Chevrolet	156	19
19	32	47	Ricky Stenhouse Jr.	JTG Daugherty Racing	Chevrolet	156	18
20	1	17	Chris Buescher	Roush Fenway Racing	Ford	156	17
21	12	43	Bubba Wallace	Richard Petty Motorsports	Chevrolet	156	16
22	22	32	Corey LaJoie	Go Fas Racing	Ford	156	15
23	36	38	John Hunter Nemechek (R)	Front Row Motorsports	Ford	156	14
24	3	8	Tyler Reddick (R)	Richard Childress Racing	Chevrolet	156	13
25	34	41	Cole Custer (R)	Stewart-Haas Racing	Ford	156	12
26	24	96	Daniel Suárez	Gaunt Brothers Racing	Toyota	156	11
27	10	20	Erik Jones	Joe Gibbs Racing	Toyota	156	20
28	29	34	Michael McDowell	Front Row Motorsports	Ford	156	9
29	26	27	J. J. Yeley (i)	Rick Ware Racing	Ford	154	0
30	37	15	Brennan Poole (R)	Premium Motorsports	Chevrolet	153	7
31	30	74	Reed Sorenson	Spire Motorsports	Chevrolet	153	6
32	27	00	Quin Houff (R)	StarCom Racing	Chevrolet	153	5
33	39	7	Josh Bilicki (i)	Tommy Baldwin Racing	Chevrolet	152	0
34	35	53	Garrett Smithley (i)	Rick Ware Racing	Ford	152	0
35	33	66	Timmy Hill (i)	MBM Motorsports	Toyota	150	0
36	21	88	Alex Bowman	Hendrick Motorsports	Chevrolet	149	1
37	38	51	James Davison	Petty Ware Racing	Ford	147	1
38	17	12	Ryan Blaney	Team Penske	Ford	95	6
39	19	2	Brad Keselowski	Team Penske	Ford	95	10
Official race results

=== Race statistics ===
- Lead changes: 10 among 6 different drivers
- Cautions/Laps: 5 for 24
- Red flags: 0
- Time of race: 2 hours, 9 minutes and 35 seconds
- Average speed: 144.463 miles per hour (232.491 km/h)

== Media ==
=== Television ===
NBC Sports covered the race on the television side. Rick Allen, Jeff Burton, Steve Letarte and two-time Michigan winner, Dale Earnhardt Jr. covered the race from the booth at Charlotte Motor Speedway. Marty Snider and Kelli Stavast handled the pit road duties on site, and Rutledge Wood handled the features from his home during the race.

NBCSN
Booth announcers	Pit reporters	Features reporter
Lap-by-lap: Rick Allen; Color-commentator: Jeff Burton; Color-commentator: Steve Letarte; Color-commentator: Dale Earnhardt Jr.	Marty Snider; Kelli Stavast	Rutledge Wood

=== Radio ===
Radio coverage of the race was broadcast by Motor Racing Network (MRN) and simulcast on Sirius XM NASCAR Radio. Alex Hayden and Jeff Striegle called the race in the booth while the field is racing on the front stretch. Dave Moody called the race from a billboard outside of turn 2 when the field is racing through turns 1 and 2. Kyle Rickey called the race from a platform outside of turn 3 when the field races through turns 3 and 4. Winston Kelley and Kim Coon worked pit road for the radio side.

MRN
Booth announcers	Turn announcers	Pit reporters
Lead announcer: Alex Hayden; Announcer: Jeff Striegle	Turns 1 & 2: Dave Moody; Turns 3 & 4: Kyle Rickey	Winston Kelley; Kim Coon

== Standings after the race ==
Drivers' Championship standings

	Pos	Driver	Points
	1	Kevin Harvick	916
	2	Brad Keselowski	779 (–137)
	3	Denny Hamlin	776 (–140)
	4	Ryan Blaney	741 (–175)
	5	Chase Elliott	721 (–195)
	6	Joey Logano	717 (–199)
	7	Martin Truex Jr.	716 (–200)
	8	Aric Almirola	669 (–247)
1	9	Kyle Busch	651 (–265)
1	10	Kurt Busch	648 (–268)
	11	Alex Bowman	585 (–331)
	12	Clint Bowyer	571 (–345)
	13	Matt DiBenedetto	568 (–348)
	14	William Byron	537 (–379)
	15	Erik Jones	511 (–405)
1	16	Jimmie Johnson	511 (–405)
Official driver's standings

Manufacturers' Championship standings

Pos	Manufacturer	Points
1	Ford	828
2	Toyota	770 (–58)
3	Chevrolet	725 (–103)

- Note: Only the first 16 positions are included for the driver standings.
- . – Driver has clinched a position in the NASCAR Cup Series playoffs.

Previous race: 2020 FireKeepers Casino 400	NASCAR Cup Series; 2020 season	Next race: 2020 Go Bowling 235
