= 2020 Super Start Batteries 400 =

NASCAR Cup Series race

2020 Super Start Batteries 400 presented by O'Reilly Auto Parts
Race details
- Race 19 of 36 in the 2020 NASCAR Cup Series
- 2020 Super Start Batteries 400 program cover
- Date: July 23, 2020
- Location: Kansas Speedway in Kansas City, Kansas
- Course: Permanent racing facility
- Course length: 1.5 miles (2.4 km)
- Distance: 267 laps, 400.5 mi (644.542 km)
- Average speed: 121.835 miles per hour (196.074 km/h)

Pole position
Driver	Kevin Harvick	Stewart-Haas Racing
- Grid positions set by ballot

Most laps led
Driver	Denny Hamlin	Joe Gibbs Racing
- Laps: 57

Winner
No. 11	Denny Hamlin	Joe Gibbs Racing

Television in the United States
- Network: NBCSN
- Announcers: Rick Allen, Jeff Burton, Steve Letarte and Dale Earnhardt Jr.
- Nielsen ratings: 1.470 million

Radio in the United States
- Radio: MRN
- Booth announcers: Alex Hayden and Jeff Striegle
- Turn announcers: Dave Moody (1 & 2) and Kurt Becker (3 & 4)

The 2020 Super Start Batteries 400 presented by O'Reilly Auto Parts was a NASCAR Cup Series race that was originally scheduled to be held on May 31, 2020, and was rescheduled to July 23, 2020, at Kansas Speedway in Kansas City, Kansas. Contested over 267 laps, on the 1.5 mile (2.4 km) asphalt speedway, it will be the 19th race of the 2020 NASCAR Cup Series season.

== Report ==
=== Background ===
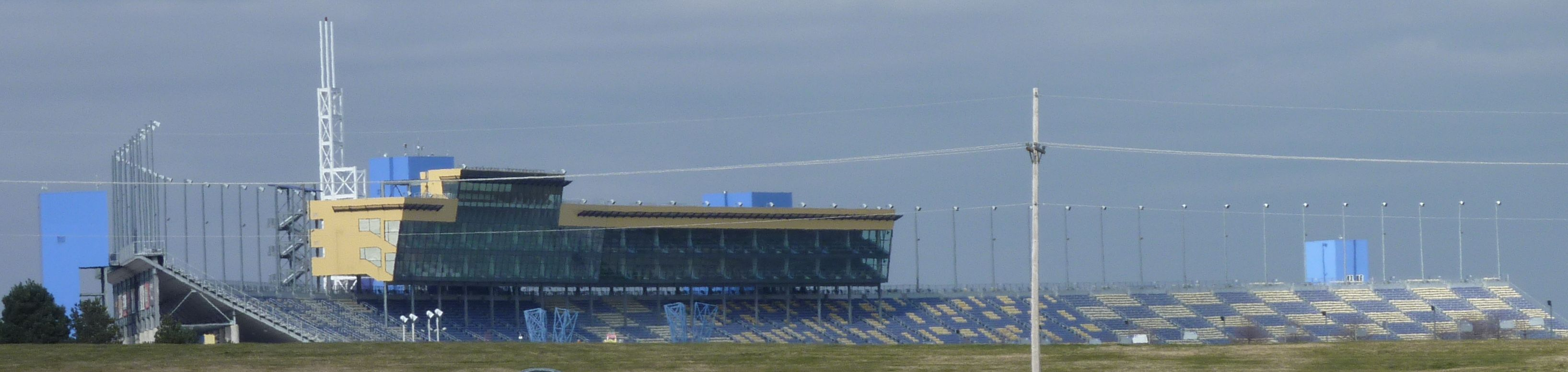
Kansas Speedway, the track where the race was held.

Kansas Speedway is a 1.5-mile (2.4 km) tri-oval race track in Kansas City, Kansas. It was built in 2001 and hosts two annual NASCAR race weekends. The NTT IndyCar Series also raced there until 2011. The speedway is owned and operated by the International Speedway Corporation.

==== Entry list ====
- (R) denotes rookie driver.
- (i) denotes driver who are ineligible for series driver points.

No.	Driver	Team	Manufacturer
00	Quin Houff (R)	StarCom Racing	Chevrolet
1	Kurt Busch	Chip Ganassi Racing	Chevrolet
2	Brad Keselowski	Team Penske	Ford
3	Austin Dillon	Richard Childress Racing	Chevrolet
4	Kevin Harvick	Stewart-Haas Racing	Ford
6	Ryan Newman	Roush Fenway Racing	Ford
7	Reed Sorenson	Tommy Baldwin Racing	Chevrolet
8	Tyler Reddick (R)	Richard Childress Racing	Chevrolet
9	Chase Elliott	Hendrick Motorsports	Chevrolet
10	Aric Almirola	Stewart-Haas Racing	Ford
11	Denny Hamlin	Joe Gibbs Racing	Toyota
12	Ryan Blaney	Team Penske	Ford
13	Ty Dillon	Germain Racing	Chevrolet
14	Clint Bowyer	Stewart-Haas Racing	Ford
15	Brennan Poole (R)	Premium Motorsports	Chevrolet
17	Chris Buescher	Roush Fenway Racing	Ford
18	Kyle Busch	Joe Gibbs Racing	Toyota
19	Martin Truex Jr.	Joe Gibbs Racing	Toyota
20	Erik Jones	Joe Gibbs Racing	Toyota
21	Matt DiBenedetto	Wood Brothers Racing	Ford
22	Joey Logano	Team Penske	Ford
24	William Byron	Hendrick Motorsports	Chevrolet
27	J. J. Yeley (i)	Rick Ware Racing	Ford
32	Corey LaJoie	Go Fas Racing	Ford
34	Michael McDowell	Front Row Motorsports	Ford
37	Ryan Preece	JTG Daugherty Racing	Chevrolet
38	John Hunter Nemechek (R)	Front Row Motorsports	Ford
41	Cole Custer (R)	Stewart-Haas Racing	Ford
42	Matt Kenseth	Chip Ganassi Racing	Chevrolet
43	Bubba Wallace	Richard Petty Motorsports	Chevrolet
47	Ricky Stenhouse Jr.	JTG Daugherty Racing	Chevrolet
48	Jimmie Johnson	Hendrick Motorsports	Chevrolet
51	Joey Gase (i)	Petty Ware Racing	Ford
53	Josh Bilicki (i)	Rick Ware Racing	Chevrolet
66	Timmy Hill (i)	MBM Motorsports	Toyota
77	Garrett Smithley (i)	Spire Motorsports	Chevrolet
78	B. J. McLeod (i)	B. J. McLeod Motorsports	Chevrolet
88	Alex Bowman	Hendrick Motorsports	Chevrolet
95	Christopher Bell (R)	Leavine Family Racing	Toyota
96	Daniel Suárez	Gaunt Brothers Racing	Toyota
Official entry list

== Qualifying ==
Kevin Harvick was awarded the pole for the race as determined by a random draw.

=== Starting Lineup ===
Pos	No.	Driver	Team	Manufacturer
1	4	Kevin Harvick	Stewart-Haas Racing	Ford
2	22	Joey Logano	Team Penske	Ford
3	10	Aric Almirola	Stewart-Haas Racing	Ford
4	12	Ryan Blaney	Team Penske	Ford
5	19	Martin Truex Jr.	Joe Gibbs Racing	Toyota
6	88	Alex Bowman	Hendrick Motorsports	Chevrolet
7	2	Brad Keselowski	Team Penske	Ford
8	18	Kyle Busch	Joe Gibbs Racing	Toyota
9	1	Kurt Busch	Chip Ganassi Racing	Chevrolet
10	11	Denny Hamlin	Joe Gibbs Racing	Toyota
11	9	Chase Elliott	Hendrick Motorsports	Chevrolet
12	21	Matt DiBenedetto	Wood Brothers Racing	Ford
13	17	Chris Buescher	Roush Fenway Racing	Ford
14	42	Matt Kenseth	Chip Ganassi Racing	Chevrolet
15	24	William Byron	Hendrick Motorsports	Chevrolet
16	3	Austin Dillon	Richard Childress Racing	Chevrolet
17	43	Bubba Wallace	Richard Petty Motorsports	Chevrolet
18	6	Ryan Newman	Roush Fenway Racing	Ford
19	14	Clint Bowyer	Stewart-Haas Racing	Ford
20	48	Jimmie Johnson	Hendrick Motorsports	Chevrolet
21	20	Erik Jones	Joe Gibbs Racing	Toyota
22	95	Christopher Bell (R)	Leavine Family Racing	Toyota
23	8	Tyler Reddick (R)	Richard Childress Racing	Chevrolet
24	41	Cole Custer (R)	Stewart-Haas Racing	Ford
25	47	Ricky Stenhouse Jr.	JTG Daugherty Racing	Chevrolet
26	77	Garrett Smithley (i)	Spire Motorsports	Chevrolet
27	34	Michael McDowell	Front Row Motorsports	Ford
28	27	J. J. Yeley (i)	Rick Ware Racing	Ford
29	15	Brennan Poole (R)	Premium Motorsports	Chevrolet
30	38	John Hunter Nemechek (R)	Front Row Motorsports	Ford
31	32	Corey LaJoie	Go Fas Racing	Ford
32	00	Quin Houff (R)	StarCom Racing	Chevrolet
33	53	Josh Bilicki (i)	Rick Ware Racing	Chevrolet
34	51	Joey Gase (i)	Petty Ware Racing	Ford
35	37	Ryan Preece	JTG Daugherty Racing	Chevrolet
36	13	Ty Dillon	Germain Racing	Chevrolet
37	96	Daniel Suárez	Gaunt Brothers Racing	Toyota
38	66	Timmy Hill (i)	MBM Motorsports	Toyota
39	7	Reed Sorenson	Tommy Baldwin Racing	Chevrolet
40	78	B. J. McLeod (i)	B. J. McLeod Motorsports	Chevrolet
Official starting lineup

== Race ==
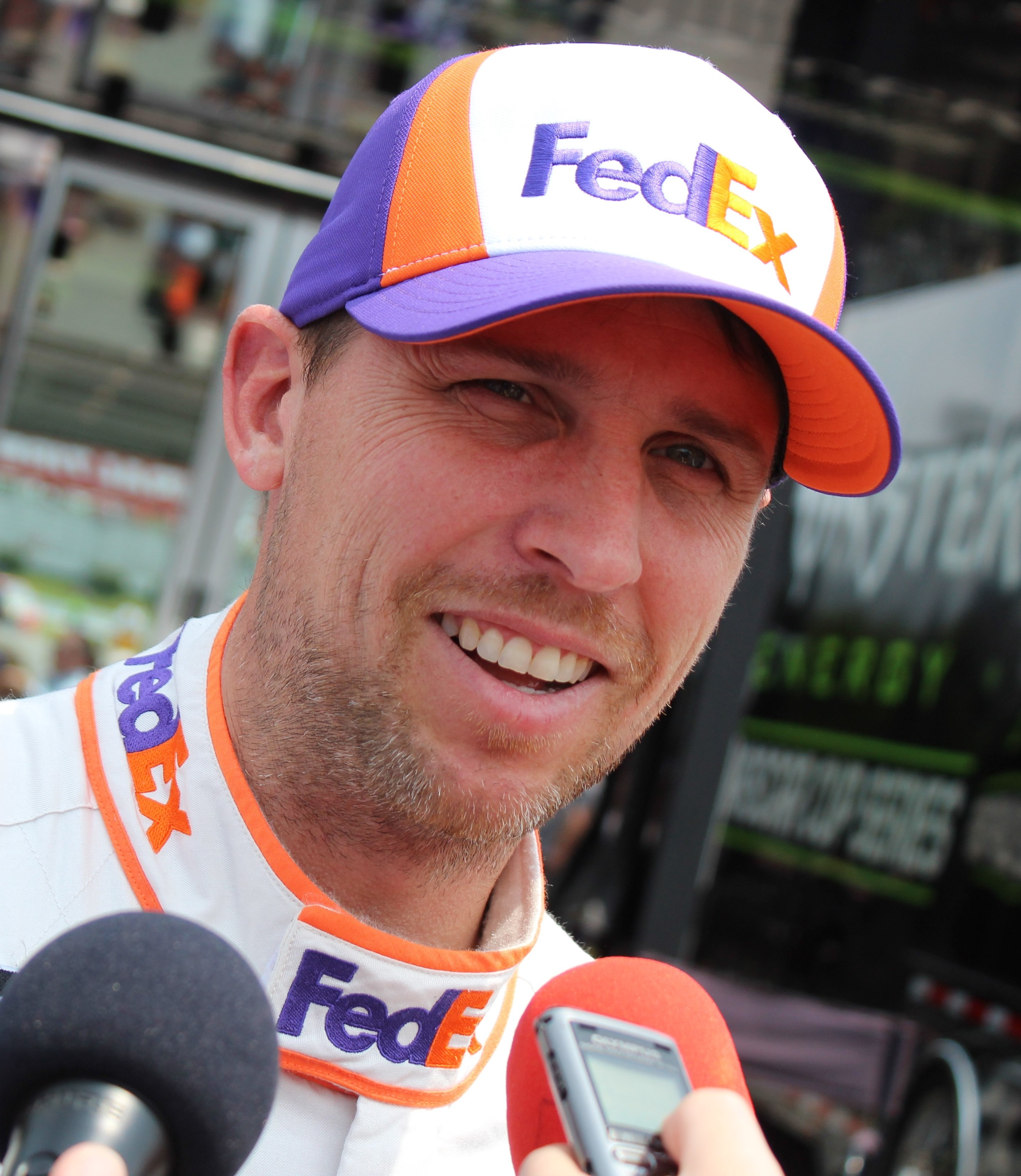
Denny Hamlin won the race.

=== Stage Results ===
Stage One Laps: 80

Pos	No	Driver	Team	Manufacturer	Points
1	18	Kyle Busch	Joe Gibbs Racing	Toyota	10
2	11	Denny Hamlin	Joe Gibbs Racing	Toyota	9
3	19	Martin Truex Jr.	Joe Gibbs Racing	Toyota	8
4	12	Ryan Blaney	Team Penske	Ford	7
5	2	Brad Keselowski	Team Penske	Ford	6
6	8	Tyler Reddick (R)	Richard Childress Racing	Chevrolet	5
7	4	Kevin Harvick	Stewart-Haas Racing	Ford	4
8	10	Aric Almirola	Stewart-Haas Racing	Ford	3
9	88	Alex Bowman	Hendrick Motorsports	Chevrolet	2
10	20	Erik Jones	Joe Gibbs Racing	Toyota	1
Official stage one results

Stage Two Laps: 80

Pos	No	Driver	Team	Manufacturer	Points
1	2	Brad Keselowski	Team Penske	Ford	10
2	12	Ryan Blaney	Team Penske	Ford	9
3	10	Aric Almirola	Stewart-Haas Racing	Ford	8
4	11	Denny Hamlin	Joe Gibbs Racing	Toyota	7
5	18	Kyle Busch	Joe Gibbs Racing	Toyota	6
6	4	Kevin Harvick	Stewart-Haas Racing	Ford	5
7	20	Erik Jones	Joe Gibbs Racing	Toyota	4
8	19	Martin Truex Jr.	Joe Gibbs Racing	Toyota	3
9	48	Jimmie Johnson	Hendrick Motorsports	Chevrolet	2
10	9	Chase Elliott	Hendrick Motorsports	Chevrolet	1
Official stage two results

=== Final Stage Results ===
Stage Three Laps: 107

Pos	Grid	No	Driver	Team	Manufacturer	Laps	Points
1	10	11	Denny Hamlin	Joe Gibbs Racing	Toyota	267	56
2	7	2	Brad Keselowski	Team Penske	Ford	267	51
3	5	19	Martin Truex Jr.	Joe Gibbs Racing	Toyota	267	45
4	1	4	Kevin Harvick	Stewart-Haas Racing	Ford	267	42
5	21	20	Erik Jones	Joe Gibbs Racing	Toyota	267	37
6	3	10	Aric Almirola	Stewart-Haas Racing	Ford	267	42
7	24	41	Cole Custer (R)	Stewart-Haas Racing	Ford	267	30
8	6	88	Alex Bowman	Hendrick Motorsports	Chevrolet	267	31
9	9	1	Kurt Busch	Chip Ganassi Racing	Chevrolet	267	28
10	15	24	William Byron	Hendrick Motorsports	Chevrolet	267	27
11	8	18	Kyle Busch	Joe Gibbs Racing	Toyota	267	42
12	11	9	Chase Elliott	Hendrick Motorsports	Chevrolet	267	26
13	23	8	Tyler Reddick (R)	Richard Childress Racing	Chevrolet	267	29
14	19	14	Clint Bowyer	Stewart-Haas Racing	Ford	267	23
15	36	13	Ty Dillon	Germain Racing	Chevrolet	267	22
16	27	34	Michael McDowell	Front Row Motorsports	Ford	267	21
17	14	42	Matt Kenseth	Chip Ganassi Racing	Chevrolet	267	20
18	37	96	Daniel Suárez	Gaunt Brothers Racing	Toyota	267	19
19	30	38	John Hunter Nemechek (R)	Front Row Motorsports	Ford	266	18
20	4	12	Ryan Blaney	Team Penske	Ford	266	33
21	31	32	Corey LaJoie	Go Fas Racing	Ford	266	16
22	28	27	J. J. Yeley (i)	Rick Ware Racing	Ford	265	0
23	22	95	Christopher Bell (R)	Leavine Family Racing	Toyota	264	14
24	32	00	Quin Houff (R)	StarCom Racing	Chevrolet	260	13
25	33	53	Josh Bilicki (i)	Rick Ware Racing	Chevrolet	260	0
26	26	77	Garrett Smithley (i)	Spire Motorsports	Chevrolet	260	0
27	16	3	Austin Dillon	Richard Childress Racing	Chevrolet	251	10
28	18	6	Ryan Newman	Roush Fenway Racing	Ford	251	9
29	34	51	Joey Gase (i)	Petty Ware Racing	Ford	251	0
30	29	15	Brennan Poole (R)	Premium Motorsports	Chevrolet	219	7
31	39	7	Reed Sorenson	Tommy Baldwin Racing	Chevrolet	216	6
32	20	48	Jimmie Johnson	Hendrick Motorsports	Chevrolet	200	7
33	13	17	Chris Buescher	Roush Fenway Racing	Ford	182	4
34	35	37	Ryan Preece	JTG Daugherty Racing	Chevrolet	181	3
35	2	22	Joey Logano	Team Penske	Ford	176	2
36	12	21	Matt DiBenedetto	Wood Brothers Racing	Ford	175	1
37	17	43	Bubba Wallace	Richard Petty Motorsports	Chevrolet	170	1
38	38	66	Timmy Hill (i)	MBM Motorsports	Toyota	116	0
39	40	78	B. J. McLeod (i)	B. J. McLeod Motorsports	Chevrolet	66	0
40	25	47	Ricky Stenhouse Jr.	JTG Daugherty Racing	Chevrolet	58	1
Official race results

=== Race statistics ===
- Lead changes: 22 among 9 different drivers
- Cautions/Laps: 11 for 47
- Red flags: 1 for 2 minutes and 45 seconds
- Time of race: 3 hours, 17 minutes and 14 seconds
- Average speed: 121.835 miles per hour (196.074 km/h)

== Media ==
=== Television ===
NBC Sports covered the race on the television side. Rick Allen, Jeff Burton, Steve Letarte and Dale Earnhardt Jr. covered the race from the booth at Charlotte Motor Speedway. Parker Kligerman and Kelli Stavast handled the pit road duties on site, and Marty Snider handled the features from the RCR shop during the race.

NBCSN
Booth announcers	Pit reporters	Features reporter
Lap-by-lap: Rick Allen; Color-commentator: Jeff Burton; Color-commentator: Steve Letarte; Color-commentator: Dale Earnhardt Jr.	Parker Kligerman; Kelli Stavast	Marty Snider

=== Radio ===
MRN had the radio call for the race which was also simulcast on Sirius XM NASCAR Radio. Alex Hayden and Jeff Striegle called the race in the booth when the field raced through the tri-oval. Dave Moody covered the race from the Sunoco spotters stand outside turn 2 when the field was racing through turns 1 and 2. Kurt Becker called the race from a platform outside turn 4. Winston Kelley and Steve Post worked pit road for the radio side.

MRN Radio
Booth announcers	Turn announcers	Pit reporters
Lead announcer: Alex Hayden; Announcer: Jeff Striegle	Turns 1 & 2: Dave Moody; Turns 3 & 4: Kurt Becker	Winston Kelley; Steve Post

== Standings after the race ==
Drivers' Championship standings

	Pos	Driver	Points
	1	Kevin Harvick	763
1	2	Brad Keselowski	666 (–97)
1	3	Ryan Blaney	663 (–100)
2	4	Denny Hamlin	634 (–129)
	5	Chase Elliott	630 (–133)
2	6	Joey Logano	609 (–154)
	7	Martin Truex Jr.	602 (–161)
	8	Aric Almirola	576 (–187)
1	9	Kyle Busch	562 (–201)
1	10	Kurt Busch	561 (–202)
	11	Alex Bowman	539 (–224)
1	12	Clint Bowyer	484 (–279)
1	13	Matt DiBenedetto	477 (–286)
2	14	William Byron	452 (–311)
2	15	Tyler Reddick	442 (–321)
2	16	Erik Jones	440 (–323)
Official driver's standings

Manufacturers' Championship standings

Pos	Manufacturer	Points
1	Ford	708
2	Toyota	666 (–42)
3	Chevrolet	638 (–70)

- Note: Only the first 16 positions are included for the driver standings.
- . – Driver has clinched a position in the NASCAR Cup Series playoffs.

Previous race: 2020 O'Reilly Auto Parts 500	NASCAR Cup Series; 2020 season	Next race: 2020 Foxwoods Resort Casino 301
