= Scott Heckert =

American racing driver (born 1993)

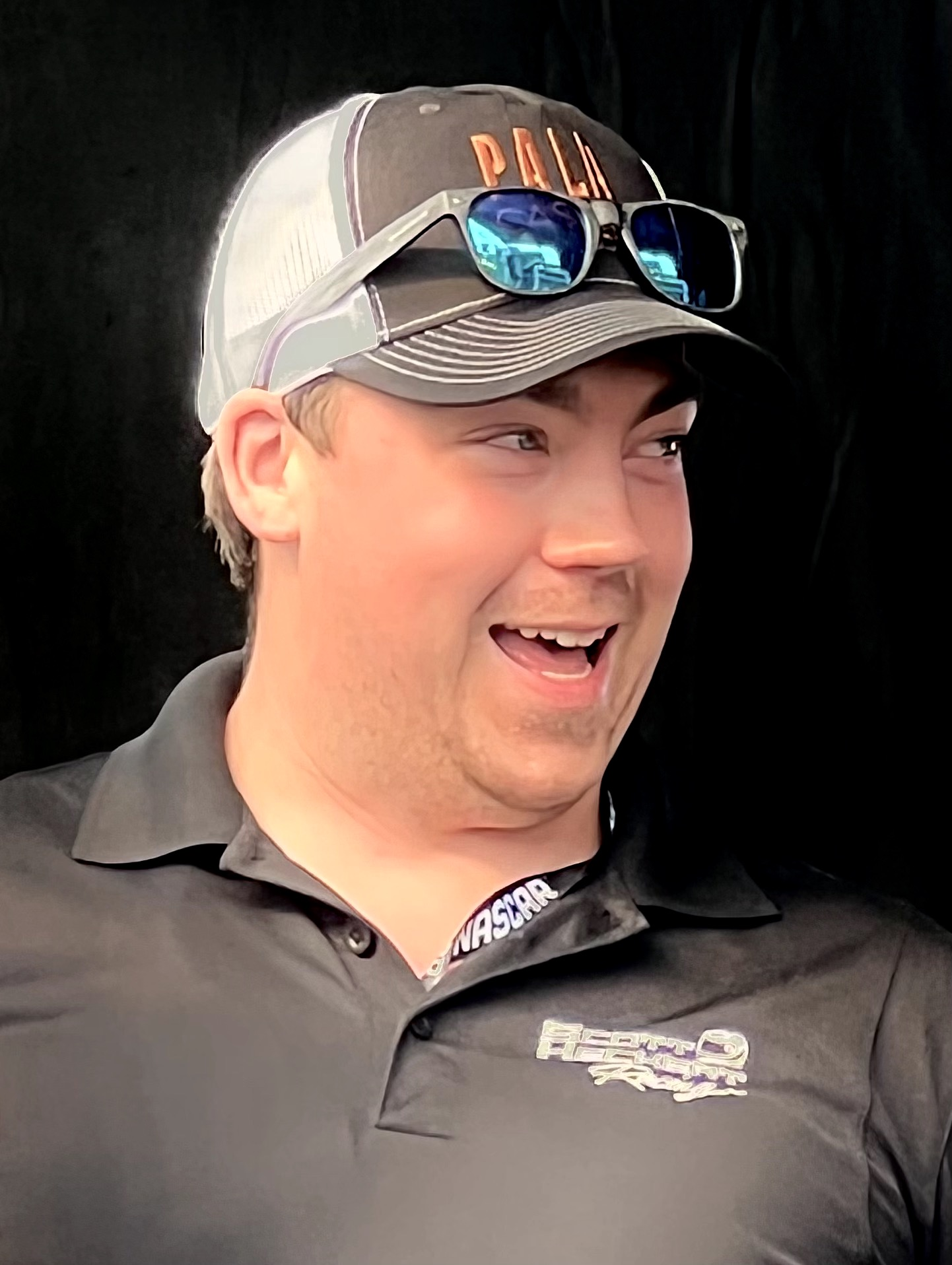
- Heckert at Sonoma Raceway in 2022
- Born: Scott Rodgers Heckert; November 21, 1993 (age 32); Ridgefield, Connecticut, U.S.

NASCAR Cup Series career
- 4 races run over 2 years
- 2022 position: 60th
- Best finish: 34th (2021)
- First race: 2021 O'Reilly Auto Parts 253 (Daytona RC)
- Last race: 2022 Toyota/Save Mart 350 (Sonoma)
Wins	Top tens	Poles
0	0	0

NASCAR O'Reilly Auto Parts Series career
- 15 races run over 5 years
- 2022 position: 48th
- Best finish: 46th (2016)
- First race: 2016 AutoLotto 200 (Loudon)
- Last race: 2022 Drive for the Cure 250 (Charlotte Roval)
Wins	Top tens	Poles
0	0	0
- Statistics up to date as of November 5, 2022.

Scott Rodgers Heckert (born November 21, 1993) is an American professional racing driver. He previously drove full-time in NASCAR for three years in the NASCAR K&N Pro Series East; in the last of those years, 2015, he finished second in the point standings. Heckert has also driven in the ARCA Racing Series, the Blancpain GT World Challenge America, NASCAR Cup Series, and the NASCAR Xfinity Series during his career.

== Racing career ==
=== NASCAR ===
==== K&N Pro Series East ====
Heckert's first season in the series, 2013, saw him log only two top ten finishes for team owner B. J. McLeod. However, Heckert mostly stayed out of trouble, retiring because of a crash only once. In 2014, he switched to Turner Scott Motorsports, where he grabbed three poles and two wins, both at road courses. In 2015, Heckert moved to HScott Motorsports with Justin Marks, he recorded another two wins, as many poles, and was in contention for the series championship in the final race.

=== Xfinity Series ===
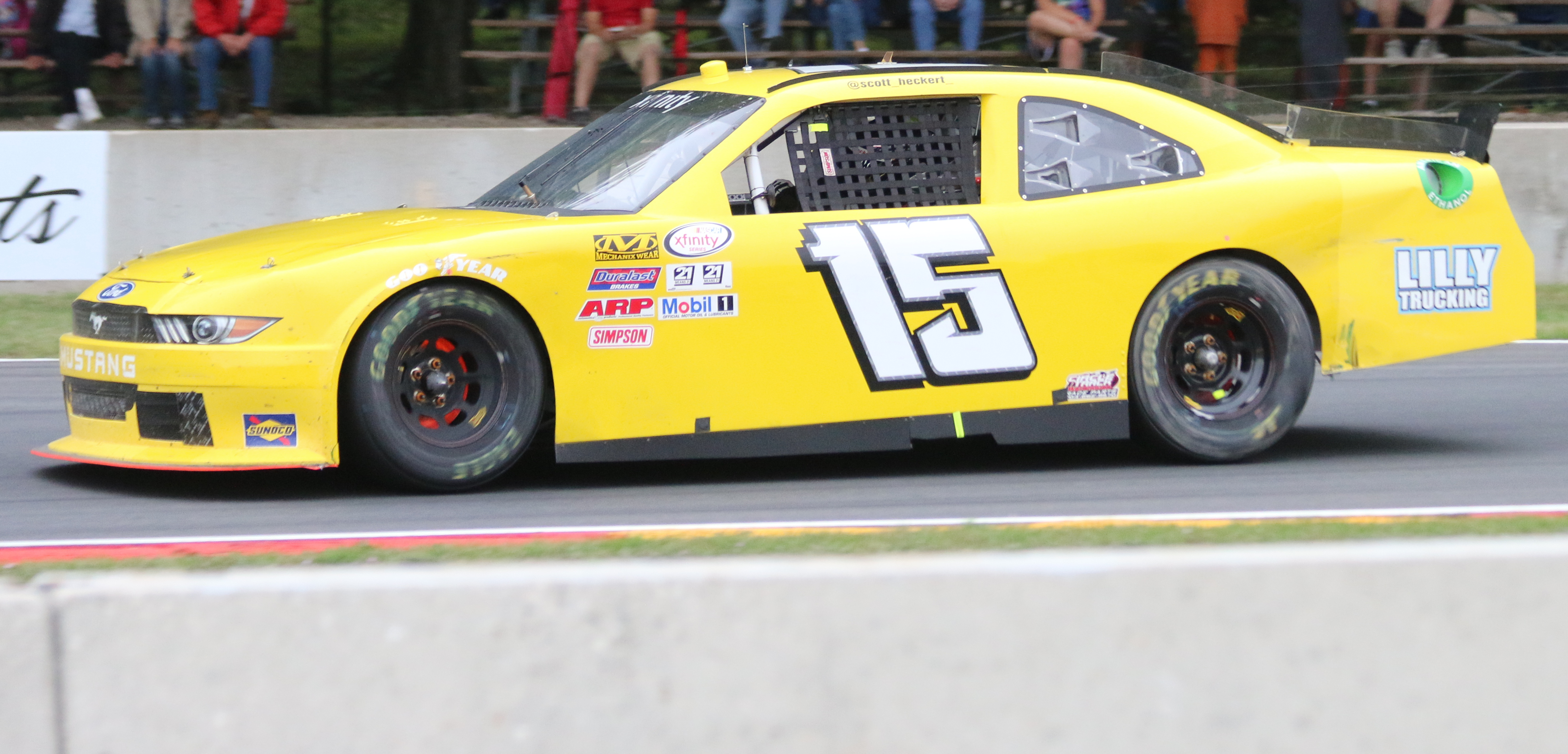
Heckert's 2016 Road America car

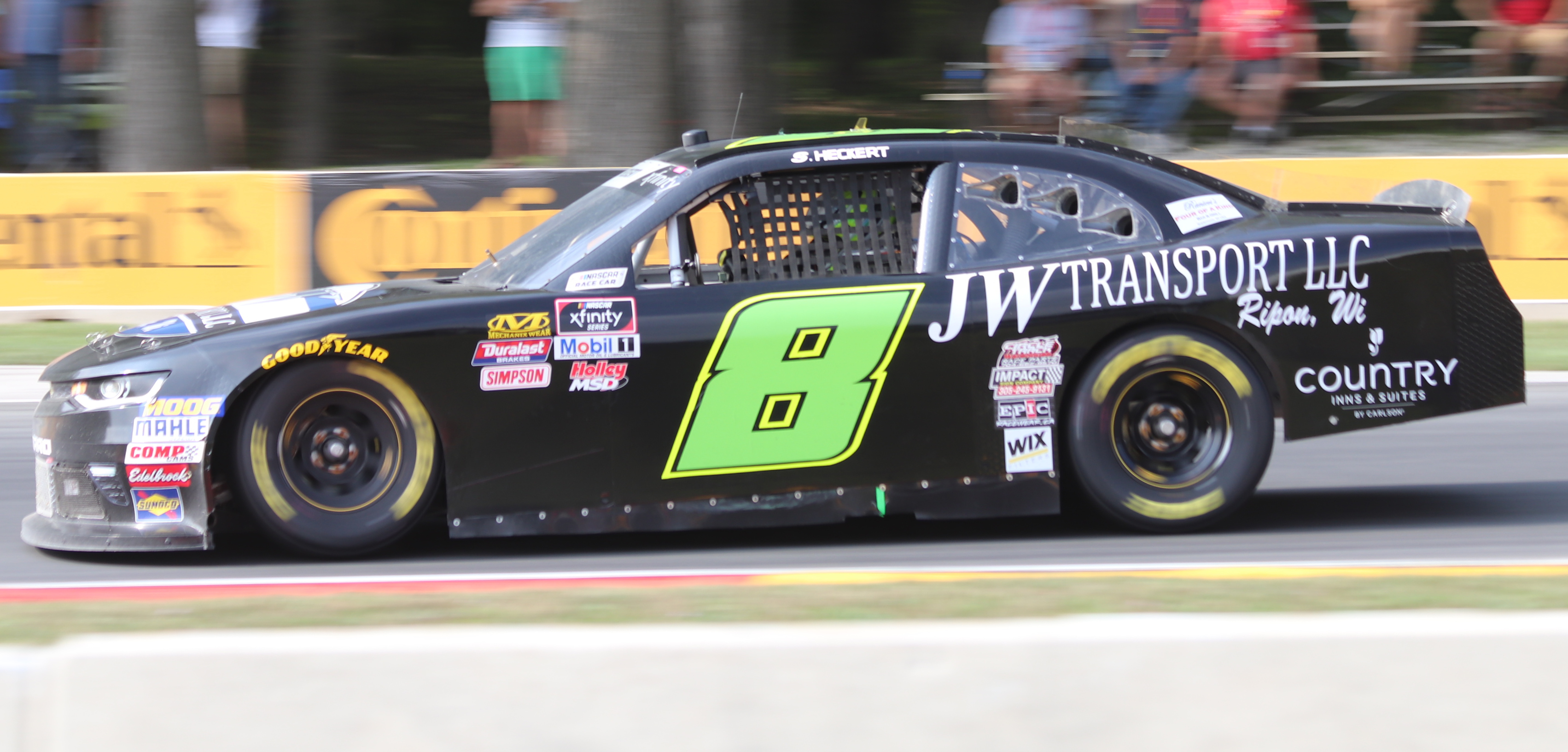
Heckert's 2018 Road America car

Heckert debuted in 2016 at New Hampshire Motor Speedway, where he finished twenty sixth, driving for B. J. McLeod Motorsports. Three races later at Watkins Glen International, he recorded his first top twenty finish with a sixteenth. Running another road course race at Road America, Heckert was running inside the top-twenty until contact with James Davison in the final corner of the race relegated him to 29th. Two years later, Heckert returned to McLeod team, and drove the No. 78 for the team at Chicagoland Speedway, his first Xfinity start on an oval, and the No. 8 at both Watkins Glen International and Road America. He would run the No. 5 (the renumbered No. 8 car from 2018) at Watkins Glen in 2019, where he picked up his career-best thirteenth place finish, and Mid-Ohio Sports Car Course in the No. 78. In both races, he drove an entry for the team instead of their full-time driver Matt Mills. Heckert returned to BJMM again in 2020, making it his third year in a row and the fourth of the previous five years running at least one of the road course races for the team. His first start of the season came at Road America, where he drove the No. 78 again, replacing the full-time driver of that car, Vinnie Miller.

=== Sports cars ===
In 2016, Heckert made the move to the Pirelli World Challenge, crediting simulators such as iRacing for a quick transition from stock cars, which included podium results early on. By the end of the 2016 season, Heckert had collected multiple victories in the GTS class. Heckert found overall victory at Virginia International Raceway in 2018 with Lone Star Racing and co-driver Mike Skeen in what was then named the Blancpain GT World Challenge America.

=== Cup Series ===
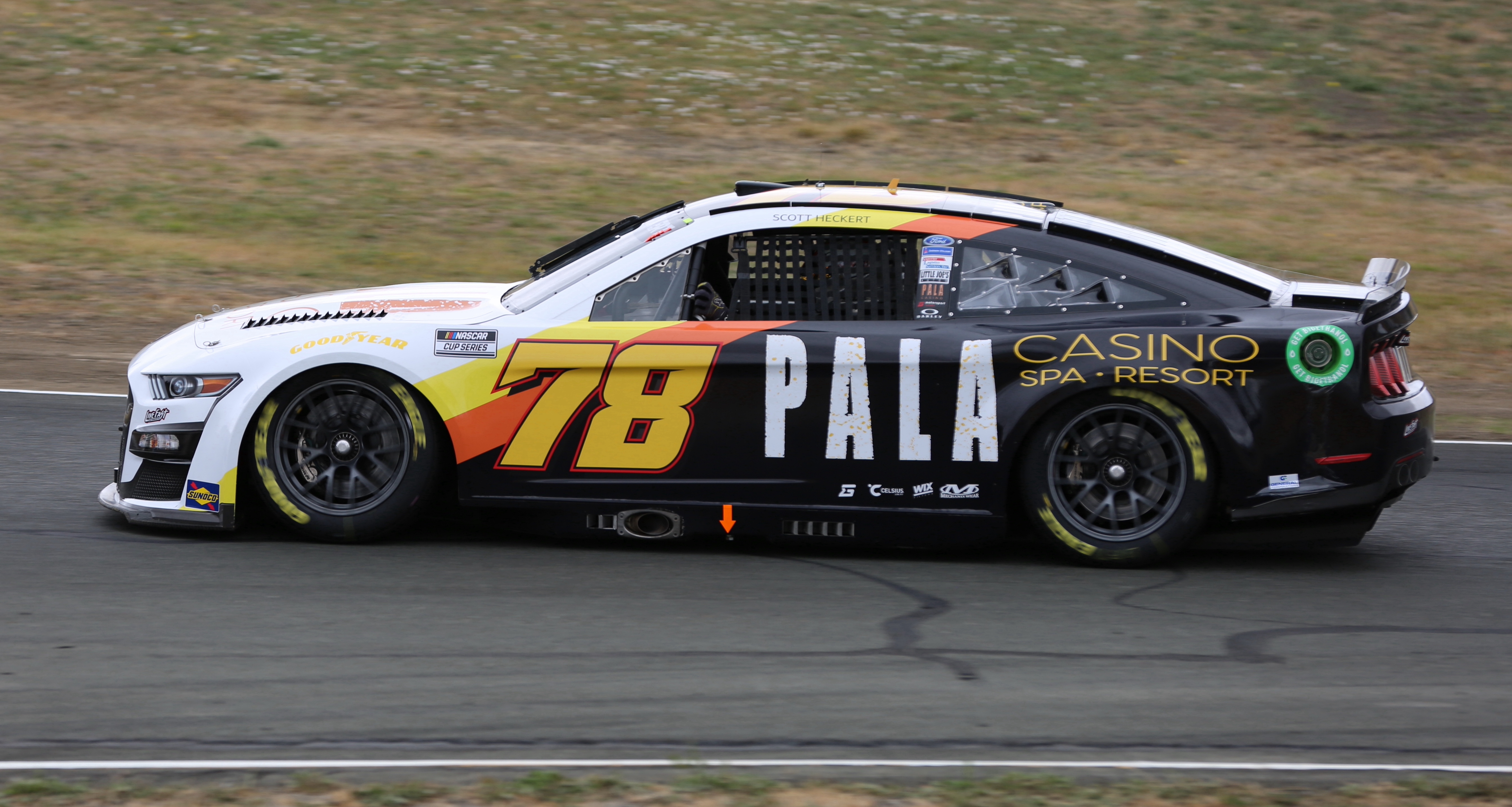
Heckert’s No. 78 car at Sonoma Raceway in 2022

Heckert made his NASCAR Cup Series debut on February 21, 2021, driving for Live Fast Motorsports in the No. 78 Ford at the Daytona International Speedway road course.

== Personal life ==
Heckert is a graduate of Miami University, holding a degree in mechanical engineering.

== Motorsports career results ==
=== NASCAR ===
(key) (Bold – Pole position awarded by qualifying time. Italics – Pole position earned by points standings or practice time. * – Most laps led.)

==== Cup Series ====
NASCAR Cup Series results
Year	Team	No.	Make	1	2	3	4	5	6	7	8	9	10	11	12	13	14	15	16	17	18	19	20	21	22	23	24	25	26	27	28	29	30	31	32	33	34	35	36	NCSC	Pts	Ref
2021	Live Fast Motorsports	78	Ford	DAY	DRC; 28	HOM	LVS	PHO	ATL	BRD	MAR	RCH	TAL	KAN	DAR	DOV	COA	CLT	SON; 26	NSH	POC	POC	ROA	ATL	NHA	GLN	IRC	MCH	DAY	DAR	RCH	BRI	LVS	TAL	ROV; 31	TEX	KAN	MAR	PHO	34th	26	
2022	Live Fast Motorsports	78	Ford	DAY	CAL	LVS	PHO	ATL	COA	RCH	MAR	BRD	TAL	DOV	DAR	KAN	CLT	GTW	SON; 33	NSH	ROA	ATL	NHA	POC	IRC	MCH	RCH	GLN	DAY	DAR	KAN	BRI	TEX	TAL	ROV	LVS	HOM	MAR	PHO	60th	0^{1}	

==== Xfinity Series ====
NASCAR Xfinity Series results
Year	Team	No.	Make	1	2	3	4	5	6	7	8	9	10	11	12	13	14	15	16	17	18	19	20	21	22	23	24	25	26	27	28	29	30	31	32	33	NXSC	Pts	Ref
2016	B. J. McLeod Motorsports	15	Ford	DAY	ATL	LVS	PHO	CAL	TEX	BRI	RCH	TAL	DOV	CLT	POC	MCH	IOW	DAY	KEN	NHA; 26	IND	IOW	GLN; 16	MOH	BRI	ROA; 29	DAR	RCH	CHI	KEN	DOV	CLT	KAN	TEX	PHO	HOM	46th	52	
2018	B. J. McLeod Motorsports	78	Chevy	DAY	ATL	LVS	PHO	CAL	TEX	BRI	RCH	TAL	DOV	CLT	POC	MCH	IOW	CHI; 28	DAY	KEN	NHA	IOW															59th	24	
2018	B. J. McLeod Motorsports	8	Chevy																				GLN; 30	MOH	BRI	ROA; 29	DAR	IND	LVS	RCH	ROV	DOV	KAN	TEX	PHO	HOM	59th	24	
2019	B. J. McLeod Motorsports	5	Toyota	DAY	ATL	LVS	PHO	CAL	TEX	BRI	RCH	TAL	DOV	CLT	POC	MCH	IOW	CHI	DAY	KEN	NHA	IOW	GLN; 13														56th	34	
2019	B. J. McLeod Motorsports	78	Toyota																					MOH; 29	BRI	ROA	DAR	IND	LVS	RCH	ROV	DOV	KAN	TEX	PHO	HOM	56th	34	
2020	B. J. McLeod Motorsports	78	Toyota	DAY	LVS	CAL	PHO	DAR	CLT	BRI	ATL	HOM	HOM	TAL	POC	IRC	KEN	KEN	TEX	KAN	ROA; 33	DRC; 19	DOV	DOV	DAY	DAR	RCH	RCH	BRI	LVS	TAL	ROV	KAN	TEX	MAR	PHO	60th	23	
2022	B. J. McLeod Motorsports	5	Chevy	DAY	CAL	LVS	PHO	ATL	COA; 32	RCH	MAR	TAL	DOV	DAR	TEX	CLT	PIR; 13	NSH	ROA	ATL	NHA	POC	IRC; 31	MCH													48th	65	
2022	B. J. McLeod Motorsports	5	Ford																													ROV; 22	LVS	HOM	MAR	PHO	48th	65	
2022	B. J. McLeod Motorsports	78	Chevy																						GLN; 23	DAY	DAR	KAN	BRI	TEX	TAL						48th	65	

^{*} Season still in progress
^{1} Ineligible for series points

==== K&N Pro Series East ====
NASCAR K&N Pro Series East results
Year	Team	No.	Make	1	2	3	4	5	6	7	8	9	10	11	12	13	14	15	16	NKNPSEC	Pts	Ref
2013	B. J. McLeod Motorsports	72	Chevy	BRI; 20	GRE; 20	FIF; 17	RCH; 28	BGS; 20	IOW; 18	LGY; 18	COL; 17	IOW; 18	VIR; 8	GRE; 18	NHA; 11	DOV; 23				17th	376	
2013	B. J. McLeod Motorsports	72	Ford														RAL; 7			17th	376	
2014	Turner Scott Motorsports	34	Chevy	NSM; 21	DAY; 9	BRI; 27	GRE; 17	RCH; 18	IOW; 3	BGS; 12	FIF; 17	**LGY**; 4	NHA; 25	**COL**; 10	IOW; 5	GLN; 1	**VIR**; 1	GRE; 15	DOV; 3	8th	526	
2015	HScott Motorsports with Justin Marks	34	Chevy	NSM; 4	GRE; 25	BRI; 3	IOW; 5	**BGS**; 1*	LGY; 6	COL; 15	NHA; 2	IOW; 5	GLN; 1*	MOT; 4	**VIR**; 16*	RCH; 4	DOV; 10			2nd	531	
2017	Marsh Racing	31	Chevy	NSM	GRE	BRI	SBO	SBO	MEM	BLN	TMP	NHA	IOW	GLN; 17	LGY	NJM	DOV			66th	27	
2018	Marsh Racing	31	Chevy	NSM	BRI	LGY	SBO	SBO	MEM	NJM	THO	NHA	IOW	GLN; 3	GTW	NHA	DOV			39th	41	

=== ARCA Racing Series ===
(key) (Bold – Pole position awarded by qualifying time. Italics – Pole position earned by points standings or practice time. * – Most laps led.)

ARCA Racing Series results
Year	Team	No.	Make	1	2	3	4	5	6	7	8	9	10	11	12	13	14	15	16	17	18	19	20	ARSC	Pts	Ref
2015	HScott Motorsports with Justin Marks	43	Chevy	DAY	MOB	NSH	SLM	TAL	TOL	NJE	POC	MCH	CHI	WIN	IOW	IRP	POC	BLN	ISF	DSF	SLM	KEN; Wth	KAN	143rd	25	
