= 2021 Toyota/Save Mart 350 =

NASCAR Cup Series race

Race details
- Race 16 of 36 in the 2021 NASCAR Cup Series
- Date: June 6, 2021
- Location: Sonoma Raceway in Sonoma, California
- Course: Permanent racing facility
- Course length: 2.52 miles (4.06 km)
- Distance: 92 laps, 231.84 mi (373.11 km)
- Scheduled distance: 90 laps, 226.8 mi (364.999 km)
- Average speed: 71.445 miles per hour (114.980 km/h)

Pole position
Driver	Kyle Larson	Hendrick Motorsports
- Grid positions set by competition-based formula

Most laps led
Driver	Kyle Larson	Hendrick Motorsports
- Laps: 58

Winner
No. 5	Kyle Larson	Hendrick Motorsports

Television in the United States
- Network: FS1
- Announcers: Mike Joy, Jeff Gordon and Clint Bowyer

Radio in the United States
- Radio: PRN
- Booth announcers: Doug Rice and Mark Garrow
- Turn announcers: Pat Patterson (2, 3 & 3a), Brad Gillie (4a & 7a) Nick Yeoman (8 & 9) and Rob Albright (10 & 11)

The 2021 Toyota/Save Mart 350 was a NASCAR Cup Series race held on June 6, 2021, at Sonoma Raceway in Sonoma, California. Contested over 92 laps—extended from 90 laps due to an overtime finish, on the 2.52-mile (4.06 km) road course, it was the 16th race of the 2021 NASCAR Cup Series season.

== Report ==
=== Background ===
Layout of Sonoma Raceway, the track where the race was held.

Sonoma Raceway, formerly Sears Point Raceway and Infineon Raceway is a 2.52-mile (4.06 km) road course and drag strip located on the landform known as Sears Point in the southern Sonoma Mountains in Sonoma, California, USA. The road course features 12 turns on a hilly course with 160 feet (49 m) of total elevation change. It is host to one of only seven NASCAR Cup Series races each year that are run on road courses. It is also host to the NTT IndyCar Series and several other auto races and motorcycle races such as the American Federation of Motorcyclists series. Sonoma Raceway continues to host amateur, or club racing events which may or may not be open to the general public. The largest such car club is the Sports Car Club of America.

==== Entry list ====
- (R) denotes rookie driver.
- (i) denotes driver who are ineligible for series driver points.

No.	Driver	Team	Manufacturer
00	Quin Houff	StarCom Racing	Chevrolet
1	Kurt Busch	Chip Ganassi Racing	Chevrolet
2	Brad Keselowski	Team Penske	Ford
3	Austin Dillon	Richard Childress Racing	Chevrolet
4	Kevin Harvick	Stewart-Haas Racing	Ford
5	Kyle Larson	Hendrick Motorsports	Chevrolet
6	Ryan Newman	Roush Fenway Racing	Ford
7	Corey LaJoie	Spire Motorsports	Chevrolet
8	Tyler Reddick	Richard Childress Racing	Chevrolet
9	Chase Elliott	Hendrick Motorsports	Chevrolet
10	Aric Almirola	Stewart-Haas Racing	Ford
11	Denny Hamlin	Joe Gibbs Racing	Toyota
12	Ryan Blaney	Team Penske	Ford
14	Chase Briscoe (R)	Stewart-Haas Racing	Ford
15	James Davison	Rick Ware Racing	Chevrolet
17	Chris Buescher	Roush Fenway Racing	Ford
18	Kyle Busch	Joe Gibbs Racing	Toyota
19	Martin Truex Jr.	Joe Gibbs Racing	Toyota
20	Christopher Bell	Joe Gibbs Racing	Toyota
21	Matt DiBenedetto	Wood Brothers Racing	Ford
22	Joey Logano	Team Penske	Ford
23	Bubba Wallace	23XI Racing	Toyota
24	William Byron	Hendrick Motorsports	Chevrolet
34	Michael McDowell	Front Row Motorsports	Ford
37	Ryan Preece	JTG Daugherty Racing	Chevrolet
38	Anthony Alfredo (R)	Front Row Motorsports	Ford
41	Cole Custer	Stewart-Haas Racing	Ford
42	Ross Chastain	Chip Ganassi Racing	Chevrolet
43	Erik Jones	Richard Petty Motorsports	Chevrolet
47	Ricky Stenhouse Jr.	JTG Daugherty Racing	Chevrolet
48	Alex Bowman	Hendrick Motorsports	Chevrolet
51	Cody Ware (i)	Petty Ware Racing	Chevrolet
52	Josh Bilicki	Rick Ware Racing	Ford
53	Garrett Smithley (i)	Rick Ware Racing	Ford
77	Ben Rhodes (i)	Spire Motorsports	Chevrolet
78	Scott Heckert	Live Fast Motorsports	Ford
99	Daniel Suárez	Trackhouse Racing Team	Chevrolet
Official entry list

== Qualifying ==
Kyle Larson was awarded the pole for the race as determined by competition-based formula.

=== Starting Lineup ===
Pos	No.	Driver	Team	Manufacturer
1	5	Kyle Larson	Hendrick Motorsports	Chevrolet
2	9	Chase Elliott	Hendrick Motorsports	Chevrolet
3	24	William Byron	Hendrick Motorsports	Chevrolet
4	11	Denny Hamlin	Joe Gibbs Racing	Toyota
5	18	Kyle Busch	Joe Gibbs Racing	Toyota
6	3	Austin Dillon	Richard Childress Racing	Chevrolet
7	48	Alex Bowman	Hendrick Motorsports	Chevrolet
8	4	Kevin Harvick	Stewart-Haas Racing	Ford
9	2	Brad Keselowski	Team Penske	Ford
10	8	Tyler Reddick	Richard Childress Racing	Chevrolet
11	12	Ryan Blaney	Team Penske	Ford
12	17	Chris Buescher	Roush Fenway Racing	Ford
13	22	Joey Logano	Team Penske	Ford
14	47	Ricky Stenhouse Jr.	JTG Daugherty Racing	Chevrolet
15	23	Bubba Wallace	23XI Racing	Toyota
16	99	Daniel Suárez	Trackhouse Racing Team	Chevrolet
17	21	Matt DiBenedetto	Wood Brothers Racing	Ford
18	43	Erik Jones	Richard Petty Motorsports	Chevrolet
19	19	Martin Truex Jr.	Joe Gibbs Racing	Toyota
20	20	Christopher Bell	Joe Gibbs Racing	Toyota
21	34	Michael McDowell	Front Row Motorsports	Ford
22	7	Corey LaJoie	Spire Motorsports	Chevrolet
23	41	Cole Custer	Stewart-Haas Racing	Ford
24	6	Ryan Newman	Roush Fenway Racing	Ford
25	14	Chase Briscoe (R)	Stewart-Haas Racing	Ford
26	10	Aric Almirola	Stewart-Haas Racing	Ford
27	37	Ryan Preece	JTG Daugherty Racing	Chevrolet
28	38	Anthony Alfredo (R)	Front Row Motorsports	Ford
29	42	Ross Chastain	Chip Ganassi Racing	Chevrolet
30	1	Kurt Busch	Chip Ganassi Racing	Chevrolet
31	77	Ben Rhodes (i)	Spire Motorsports	Chevrolet
32	15	James Davison	Rick Ware Racing	Chevrolet
33	00	Quin Houff	StarCom Racing	Chevrolet
34	53	Garrett Smithley (i)	Rick Ware Racing	Ford
35	78	Scott Heckert	Live Fast Motorsports	Ford
36	52	Josh Bilicki	Rick Ware Racing	Ford
37	51	Cody Ware (i)	Petty Ware Racing	Chevrolet
Official starting lineup

== Race ==
=== Stage Results ===
Stage One Laps: 20

Pos	No	Driver	Team	Manufacturer	Points
1	5	Kyle Larson	Hendrick Motorsports	Chevrolet	10
2	9	Chase Elliott	Hendrick Motorsports	Chevrolet	9
3	18	Kyle Busch	Joe Gibbs Racing	Toyota	8
4	19	Martin Truex Jr.	Joe Gibbs Racing	Toyota	7
5	48	Alex Bowman	Hendrick Motorsports	Chevrolet	6
6	3	Austin Dillon	Richard Childress Racing	Chevrolet	5
7	8	Tyler Reddick	Richard Childress Racing	Chevrolet	4
8	1	Kurt Busch	Chip Ganassi Racing	Chevrolet	3
9	21	Matt DiBenedetto	Wood Brothers Racing	Ford	2
10	43	Erik Jones	Richard Petty Motorsports	Chevrolet	1
Official stage one results

Stage Two Laps: 20

Pos	No	Driver	Team	Manufacturer	Points
1	5	Kyle Larson	Hendrick Motorsports	Chevrolet	10
2	22	Joey Logano	Team Penske	Ford	9
3	48	Alex Bowman	Hendrick Motorsports	Chevrolet	8
4	1	Kurt Busch	Chip Ganassi Racing	Chevrolet	7
5	9	Chase Elliott	Hendrick Motorsports	Chevrolet	6
6	24	William Byron	Hendrick Motorsports	Chevrolet	5
7	18	Kyle Busch	Joe Gibbs Racing	Toyota	4
8	2	Brad Keselowski	Team Penske	Ford	3
9	11	Denny Hamlin	Joe Gibbs Racing	Toyota	2
10	20	Christopher Bell	Joe Gibbs Racing	Toyota	1
Official stage two results

=== Final Stage Results ===
Stage Three Laps: 50

Pos	Grid	No	Driver	Team	Manufacturer	Laps	Points
1	1	5	Kyle Larson	Hendrick Motorsports	Chevrolet	92	60
2	2	9	Chase Elliott	Hendrick Motorsports	Chevrolet	92	50
3	19	19	Martin Truex Jr.	Joe Gibbs Racing	Toyota	92	41
4	13	22	Joey Logano	Team Penske	Ford	92	42
5	5	18	Kyle Busch	Joe Gibbs Racing	Toyota	92	44
6	30	1	Kurt Busch	Chip Ganassi Racing	Chevrolet	92	41
7	29	42	Ross Chastain	Chip Ganassi Racing	Chevrolet	92	30
8	4	11	Denny Hamlin	Joe Gibbs Racing	Toyota	92	31
9	7	48	Alex Bowman	Hendrick Motorsports	Chevrolet	92	42
10	11	12	Ryan Blaney	Team Penske	Ford	92	27
11	18	43	Erik Jones	Richard Petty Motorsports	Chevrolet	92	27
12	16	99	Daniel Suárez	Trackhouse Racing Team	Chevrolet	92	25
13	6	3	Austin Dillon	Richard Childress Racing	Chevrolet	92	29
14	15	23	Bubba Wallace	23XI Racing	Toyota	92	23
15	9	2	Brad Keselowski	Team Penske	Ford	92	25
16	12	17	Chris Buescher	Roush Fenway Racing	Ford	92	21
17	25	14	Chase Briscoe (R)	Stewart-Haas Racing	Ford	92	20
18	22	7	Corey LaJoie	Spire Motorsports	Chevrolet	92	19
19	10	8	Tyler Reddick	Richard Childress Racing	Chevrolet	92	22
20	23	41	Cole Custer	Stewart-Haas Racing	Ford	92	17
21	27	37	Ryan Preece	JTG Daugherty Racing	Chevrolet	92	16
22	8	4	Kevin Harvick	Stewart-Haas Racing	Ford	92	15
23	17	21	Matt DiBenedetto	Wood Brothers Racing	Ford	92	16
24	20	20	Christopher Bell	Joe Gibbs Racing	Toyota	92	14
25	32	15	James Davison	Rick Ware Racing	Chevrolet	92	12
26	35	78	Scott Heckert	Live Fast Motorsports	Ford	92	11
27	26	10	Aric Almirola	Stewart-Haas Racing	Ford	92	10
28	21	34	Michael McDowell	Front Row Motorsports	Ford	92	9
29	36	52	Josh Bilicki	Rick Ware Racing	Ford	92	8
30	31	77	Ben Rhodes (i)	Spire Motorsports	Chevrolet	92	0
31	28	38	Anthony Alfredo (R)	Front Row Motorsports	Ford	92	6
32	34	53	Garrett Smithley (i)	Rick Ware Racing	Ford	92	0
33	24	6	Ryan Newman	Roush Fenway Racing	Ford	92	4
34	37	51	Cody Ware (i)	Petty Ware Racing	Chevrolet	84	0
35	3	24	William Byron	Hendrick Motorsports	Chevrolet	76	7
36	33	00	Quin Houff	StarCom Racing	Chevrolet	69	1
37	14	47	Ricky Stenhouse Jr.	JTG Daugherty Racing	Chevrolet	40	1
Official race results

=== Race statistics ===
- Lead changes: 13 among 7 different drivers
- Cautions/Laps: 8 for 18
- Red flags: 0
- Time of race: 3 hours, 14 minutes and 42 seconds
- Average speed: 71.445 miles per hour (114.980 km/h)

== Media ==
=== Television ===
Fox NASCAR televised the race in the United States on FS1 for the fifth year. Mike Joy was the lap-by-lap announcer, while six-time Sonoma winner Jeff Gordon and 2012 winner Clint Bowyer were the color commentators. Jamie Little and Regan Smith handled pit road for the television side. Larry McReynolds provided insight from the Fox Sports studio in Charlotte.

FS1
Booth announcers	Pit reporters	In-race analyst
Lap-by-lap: Mike Joy; Color-commentator: Jeff Gordon; Color-commentator: Clint Bowyer	Jamie Little; Regan Smith	Larry McReynolds

=== Radio ===
Radio coverage of the race was broadcast by the Performance Racing Network. PRN's broadcast of the race was simulcasted on Sirius XM NASCAR Radio. Doug Rice and Mark Garrow announced the race in the booth while the field was racing on the pit straightaway. Pat Patterson called the race from a stand outside of turn 2 when the field was racing up turns 2, 3 and 3a. Brad Gillie called the race from a stand outside of turn 7a when the field was racing through turns 4a and 7a. Nick Yeoman called the race when the field raced thru turns 8 and 9. Rob Albright called the race from a billboard outside turn 11 when the field was racing through turns 10 and 11. Heather DeBeaux, Brett McMillan and Wendy Venturini reported from pit lane during the race.

PRN
Booth announcers	Turn announcers	Pit reporters
Lead announcer: Doug Rice; Announcer: Mark Garrow	Turns 2, 3 & 3a: Pat Patterson; Turns 4a & 7a: Brad Gillie; Turns 8 & 9: Nick Yeoman; Turns 10 & 11: Rob Albright	Heather DeBeaux; Brett McMillan; Wendy Venturini

== Standings after the race ==
Drivers' Championship standings

	Pos	Driver	Points
	1	Denny Hamlin	664
	2	Kyle Larson	617 (–47)
1	3	Chase Elliott	591 (–73)
1	4	William Byron	564 (–100)
	5	Joey Logano	548 (–116)
	6	Martin Truex Jr.	527 (–137)
1	7	Kyle Busch	520 (–144)
1	8	Ryan Blaney	509 (–155)
	9	Kevin Harvick	483 (–181)
	10	Brad Keselowski	473 (–191)
1	11	Alex Bowman	447 (–217)
1	12	Austin Dillon	436 (–228)
	13	Tyler Reddick	398 (–266)
	14	Chris Buescher	391 (–273)
	15	Christopher Bell	364 (–300)
	16	Michael McDowell	355 (–309)
Official driver's standings

Manufacturers' Championship standings

Pos	Manufacturer	Points
1	Chevrolet	587
2	Ford	556 (–31)
3	Toyota	547 (–40)

- Note: Only the first 16 positions are included for the driver standings.
- . – Driver has clinched a position in the NASCAR Cup Series playoffs.

Previous race: 2021 Coca-Cola 600	NASCAR Cup Series; 2021 season	Next race: 2021 Ally 400
