= 2022 Toyota/Save Mart 350 =

NASCAR Cup Series race

Race details
- Race 16 of 36 in the 2022 NASCAR Cup Series
- Date: June 12, 2022
- Location: Sonoma Raceway in Sonoma, California
- Course: Permanent racing facility
- Course length: 1.99 miles (3.20 km)
- Distance: 110 laps, 218.9 mi (352.285 km)
- Average speed: 78.008 miles per hour (125.542 km/h)

Pole position
Driver	Kyle Larson	Hendrick Motorsports
- Time: 1:17:776

Most laps led
Driver	Daniel Suárez	Trackhouse Racing Team
- Laps: 47

Winner
No. 99	Daniel Suárez	Trackhouse Racing Team

Television in the United States
- Network: FS1
- Announcers: Mike Joy, Larry McReynolds, and Tony Stewart

Radio in the United States
- Radio: PRN
- Booth announcers: Doug Rice and Mark Garrow
- Turn announcers: Pat Patterson (2, 3, & 3a), Brad Gillie (4a & 7a), Nick Yeoman (8 & 9), and Rob Albright (10 & 11)

The 2022 Toyota/Save Mart 350 was a NASCAR Cup Series race held on June 12, 2022, at Sonoma Raceway in Sonoma, California. Contested over 110 laps on the 1.99-mile (3.20 km) road course, it was the 16th race of the 2022 NASCAR Cup Series season.

== Report ==
=== Background ===
Layout of Sonoma Raceway, the track where the race was held.

Sonoma Raceway, formerly Sears Point Raceway and Infineon Raceway is a 1.99-mile (3.20 km) road course and drag strip located on the landform known as Sears Point in the southern Sonoma Mountains in Sonoma, California, U.S. The road course features 12 turns on a hilly course with 160 feet (49 m) of total elevation change. It is host to one of only seven NASCAR Cup Series races each year that are run on road courses. It is also host to the NTT IndyCar Series and several other auto races and motorcycle races such as the American Federation of Motorcyclists series. Sonoma Raceway continues to host amateur, or club racing events which may or may not be open to the general public. The largest such car club is the Sports Car Club of America.

In 2022, the race was reverted to racing the club configuration.

==== Entry list ====
- (R) denotes rookie driver.
- (i) denotes driver who is ineligible for series driver points.

No.	Driver	Team	Manufacturer
1	Ross Chastain	Trackhouse Racing Team	Chevrolet
2	Austin Cindric (R)	Team Penske	Ford
3	Austin Dillon	Richard Childress Racing	Chevrolet
4	Kevin Harvick	Stewart-Haas Racing	Ford
5	Kyle Larson	Hendrick Motorsports	Chevrolet
6	Brad Keselowski	RFK Racing	Ford
7	Corey LaJoie	Spire Motorsports	Chevrolet
8	Tyler Reddick	Richard Childress Racing	Chevrolet
9	Chase Elliott	Hendrick Motorsports	Chevrolet
10	Aric Almirola	Stewart-Haas Racing	Ford
11	Denny Hamlin	Joe Gibbs Racing	Toyota
12	Ryan Blaney	Team Penske	Ford
14	Chase Briscoe	Stewart-Haas Racing	Ford
15	Joey Hand	Rick Ware Racing	Ford
16	A. J. Allmendinger (i)	Kaulig Racing	Chevrolet
17	Chris Buescher	RFK Racing	Ford
18	Kyle Busch	Joe Gibbs Racing	Toyota
19	Martin Truex Jr.	Joe Gibbs Racing	Toyota
20	Christopher Bell	Joe Gibbs Racing	Toyota
21	Harrison Burton (R)	Wood Brothers Racing	Ford
22	Joey Logano	Team Penske	Ford
23	Bubba Wallace	23XI Racing	Toyota
24	William Byron	Hendrick Motorsports	Chevrolet
31	Justin Haley	Kaulig Racing	Chevrolet
34	Michael McDowell	Front Row Motorsports	Ford
38	Todd Gilliland (R)	Front Row Motorsports	Ford
41	Cole Custer	Stewart-Haas Racing	Ford
42	Ty Dillon	Petty GMS Motorsports	Chevrolet
43	Erik Jones	Petty GMS Motorsports	Chevrolet
45	Kurt Busch	23XI Racing	Toyota
47	Ricky Stenhouse Jr.	JTG Daugherty Racing	Chevrolet
48	Alex Bowman	Hendrick Motorsports	Chevrolet
51	Cody Ware	Rick Ware Racing	Ford
77	Josh Bilicki (i)	Spire Motorsports	Chevrolet
78	Scott Heckert	Live Fast Motorsports	Ford
99	Daniel Suárez	Trackhouse Racing Team	Chevrolet
Official entry list

== Practice ==
Kyle Larson was the fastest in the practice session with a time of 1:19:227 seconds and a speed of 90.424 mph (145.523 km/h).

=== Practice results ===
Pos	No.	Driver	Team	Manufacturer	Time	Speed
1	5	Kyle Larson	Hendrick Motorsports	Chevrolet	1:19:227	90.424
2	9	Chase Elliott	Hendrick Motorsports	Chevrolet	1:19:428	90.195
3	1	Ross Chastain	Trackhouse Racing Team	Chevrolet	1:19:490	90.125
Official practice results

== Qualifying ==
Kyle Larson scored the pole for the race with a time of 1:17:776 and a speed of 92.111 mph (148.238 km/h).

=== Qualifying results ===
Pos	No.	Driver	Team	Manufacturer	R1	R2
1	5	Kyle Larson	Hendrick Motorsports	Chevrolet	1:18:013	1:17:776
2	9	Chase Elliott	Hendrick Motorsports	Chevrolet	1:18:093	1:17:799
3	17	Chris Buescher	RFK Racing	Ford	1:18:555	1:17:938
4	34	Michael McDowell	Front Row Motorsports	Ford	1:18:460	1:17:941
5	8	Tyler Reddick	Richard Childress Racing	Chevrolet	1:18:413	1:18:021
6	41	Cole Custer	Stewart-Haas Racing	Ford	1:18:152	1:18:070
7	1	Ross Chastain	Trackhouse Racing Team	Chevrolet	1:18:084	1:18:137
8	99	Daniel Suárez	Trackhouse Racing Team	Chevrolet	1:18:215	1:18:148
9	22	Joey Logano	Team Penske	Ford	1:18:426	1:18:276
10	11	Denny Hamlin	Joe Gibbs Racing	Toyota	1:18:355	1:18:515
11	45	Kurt Busch	23XI Racing	Toyota	1:18:244	—
12	18	Kyle Busch	Joe Gibbs Racing	Toyota	1:18:275	—
13	3	Austin Dillon	Richard Childress Racing	Chevrolet	1:18:319	—
14	12	Ryan Blaney	Team Penske	Ford	1:18:472	—
15	14	Chase Briscoe	Stewart-Haas Racing	Ford	1:18:507	—
16	16	A. J. Allmendinger (i)	Kaulig Racing	Chevrolet	1:18:572	—
17	15	Joey Hand	Rick Ware Racing	Ford	1:18:578	—
18	31	Justin Haley	Kaulig Racing	Chevrolet	1:18:603	—
19	48	Alex Bowman	Hendrick Motorsports	Chevrolet	1:18:664	—
20	24	William Byron	Hendrick Motorsports	Chevrolet	1:18:691	—
21	10	Aric Almirola	Stewart-Haas Racing	Ford	1:18:706	—
22	6	Brad Keselowski	RFK Racing	Ford	1:18:829	—
23	4	Kevin Harvick	Stewart-Haas Racing	Ford	1:18:857	—
24	38	Todd Gilliland (R)	Front Row Motorsports	Ford	1:19:065	—
25	2	Austin Cindric (R)	Team Penske	Ford	1:19:300	—
26	21	Harrison Burton (R)	Wood Brothers Racing	Ford	1:19:315	—
27	23	Bubba Wallace	23XI Racing	Toyota	1:19:337	—
28	19	Martin Truex Jr.	Joe Gibbs Racing	Toyota	1:19:356	—
29	77	Josh Bilicki (i)	Spire Motorsports	Chevrolet	1:19:493	—
30	7	Corey LaJoie	Spire Motorsports	Chevrolet	1:19:544	—
31	20	Christopher Bell	Joe Gibbs Racing	Toyota	1:19:553	—
32	47	Ricky Stenhouse Jr.	JTG Daugherty Racing	Chevrolet	1:19:617	—
33	43	Erik Jones	Petty GMS Motorsports	Chevrolet	1:19:711	—
34	42	Ty Dillon	Petty GMS Motorsports	Chevrolet	1:20:037	—
35	78	Scott Heckert	Live Fast Motorsports	Ford	1:21:171	—
36	51	Cody Ware	Rick Ware Racing	Ford	0.000	—
Official qualifying results

== Race ==
=== Stage Results ===
Stage One Laps: 25

Pos	No	Driver	Team	Manufacturer	Points
1	5	Kyle Larson	Hendrick Motorsports	Chevrolet	10
2	22	Joey Logano	Team Penske	Ford	9
3	18	Kyle Busch	Joe Gibbs Racing	Toyota	8
4	31	Justin Haley	Kaulig Racing	Chevrolet	7
5	10	Aric Almirola	Stewart-Haas Racing	Ford	6
6	21	Harrison Burton (R)	Wood Brothers Racing	Ford	5
7	77	Josh Bilicki (i)	Spire Motorsports	Chevrolet	0
8	45	Kurt Busch	23XI Racing	Toyota	3
9	47	Ricky Stenhouse Jr.	JTG Daugherty Racing	Chevrolet	2
10	51	Cody Ware	Rick Ware Racing	Ford	1
Official stage one results

Stage Two Laps: 30

Pos	No	Driver	Team	Manufacturer	Points
1	22	Joey Logano	Team Penske	Ford	10
2	10	Aric Almirola	Stewart-Haas Racing	Ford	9
3	17	Chris Buescher	RFK Racing	Ford	8
4	99	Daniel Suárez	Trackhouse Racing Team	Chevrolet	7
5	4	Kevin Harvick	Stewart-Haas Racing	Ford	6
6	38	Todd Gilliland (R)	Front Row Motorsports	Ford	5
7	21	Harrison Burton (R)	Wood Brothers Racing	Ford	4
8	34	Michael McDowell	Front Row Motorsports	Ford	3
9	47	Ricky Stenhouse Jr.	JTG Daugherty Racing	Chevrolet	2
10	12	Ryan Blaney	Team Penske	Ford	1
Official stage two results

=== Final Stage Results ===
Stage Three Laps: 55

Pos	Grid	No	Driver	Team	Manufacturer	Laps	Points
1	8	99	Daniel Suárez	Trackhouse Racing Team	Chevrolet	110	47
2	3	17	Chris Buescher	RFK Racing	Ford	110	43
3	4	34	Michael McDowell	Front Row Motorsports	Ford	110	37
4	23	4	Kevin Harvick	Stewart-Haas Racing	Ford	110	39
5	25	2	Austin Cindric (R)	Team Penske	Ford	110	32
6	14	12	Ryan Blaney	Team Penske	Ford	110	32
7	7	1	Ross Chastain	Trackhouse Racing Team	Chevrolet	110	30
8	2	9	Chase Elliott	Hendrick Motorsports	Chevrolet	110	29
9	20	24	William Byron	Hendrick Motorsports	Chevrolet	110	28
10	22	6	Brad Keselowski	RFK Racing	Ford	110	27
11	13	3	Austin Dillon	Richard Childress Racing	Chevrolet	110	26
12	18	31	Justin Haley	Kaulig Racing	Chevrolet	110	32
13	15	14	Chase Briscoe	Stewart-Haas Racing	Ford	110	24
14	21	10	Aric Almirola	Stewart-Haas Racing	Ford	110	38
15	1	5	Kyle Larson	Hendrick Motorsports	Chevrolet	110	32
16	19	48	Alex Bowman	Hendrick Motorsports	Chevrolet	110	21
17	9	22	Joey Logano	Team Penske	Ford	110	39
18	11	45	Kurt Busch	23XI Racing	Toyota	110	22
19	16	16	A. J. Allmendinger (i)	Kaulig Racing	Chevrolet	110	0
20	17	15	Joey Hand	Rick Ware Racing	Ford	110	17
21	6	41	Cole Custer	Stewart-Haas Racing	Ford	110	16
22	33	43	Erik Jones	Petty GMS Motorsports	Chevrolet	110	15
23	34	42	Ty Dillon	Petty GMS Motorsports	Chevrolet	110	14
24	24	38	Todd Gilliland (R)	Front Row Motorsports	Ford	110	18
25	32	47	Ricky Stenhouse Jr.	JTG Daugherty Racing	Chevrolet	110	16
26	28	19	Martin Truex Jr.	Joe Gibbs Racing	Toyota	110	11
27	31	20	Christopher Bell	Joe Gibbs Racing	Toyota	110	10
28	26	21	Harrison Burton (R)	Front Row Motorsports	Ford	110	18
29	29	77	Josh Bilicki (i)	Spire Motorsports	Chevrolet	110	0
30	12	18	Kyle Busch	Joe Gibbs Racing	Toyota	110	15
31	10	11	Denny Hamlin	Joe Gibbs Racing	Toyota	110	6
32	36	51	Cody Ware	Rick Ware Racing	Ford	109	-14 (Note: Ware was penalised 20 points for multiple inspection failures. Official Penalty Report)
33	35	78	Scott Heckert	Live Fast Motorsports	Ford	109	4
34	30	7	Corey LaJoie	Spire Motorsports	Chevrolet	101	3
35	5	8	Tyler Reddick	Richard Childress Racing	Chevrolet	97	2
36	27	23	Bubba Wallace	23XI Racing	Toyota	9	1
Official race results

=== Race statistics ===
- Lead changes: 6 among 6 different drivers
- Cautions/Laps: 4 for 14
- Red flags: 0
- Time of race: 2 hours, 48 minutes and 22 seconds
- Average speed: 78.008 miles per hour (125.542 km/h)

== Media ==
=== Television ===
Fox NASCAR televised the race in the United States on FS1 for the sixth year. Mike Joy was the lap-by-lap announcer, while Larry McReynolds and three-time Sonoma winner, three-time NASCAR Cup Series champion and co-owner of Stewart-Haas Racing Tony Stewart were the color commentators. McReynolds replaced normal analyst Clint Bowyer, the 2012 Sonoma winner, on leave for what was confirmed on June 16 as legal issues during the investigation into a fatal crash near Osage Beach, Missouri where Bowyer's car struck and killed an impaired woman believed to be under the influence of methamphetamine. The incident occurred June 5 on his way from the previous race in the St. Louis metropolitan region to Emporia, Kansas, where he owns dealerships.

Jamie Little and Vince Welch handled pit road for the television side.

This was Fox Sports' last Cup race for their portion of the 2022 season as NBC Sports and USA Network takes over NASCAR broadcasts for the rest of the season.

FS1
Booth announcers	Pit reporters
Lap-by-lap: Mike Joy; Color-commentator: Larry McReynolds; Color-commentator: Tony Stewart	Jamie Little; Vince Welch

=== Radio ===
Radio coverage of the race was broadcast by the Performance Racing Network. PRN's broadcast of the race was simulcasted on Sirius XM NASCAR Radio. Doug Rice and Mark Garrow announced the race in the booth while the field was racing on the pit straightaway. Brett McMillan called the race from a stand outside of turn 2 when the field was racing up turns 2, 3 and 3a. Brad Gillie called the race from a stand outside of turn 7a when the field was racing through turns 4a and 7a. Nick Yeoman called the race when the field raced thru turns 8 and 9. Pat Patterson called the race from a billboard outside turn 11 when the field was racing through turns 10 and 11. Heather DeBeaux, Alan Cavanna and Wendy Venturini reported from pit lane during the race.

PRN
Booth announcers	Turn announcers	Pit reporters
Lead announcer: Doug Rice; Announcer: Mark Garrow	Turns 2, 3 & 3a: Brett McMillan; Turns 4a & 7a: Brad Gillie; Turns 8 & 9: Nick Yeoman; Turns 10 & 11: Pat Patterson	Heather DeBeaux; Alan Cavanna; Wendy Venturini

== Standings after the race ==
Drivers' Championship standings

	Pos	Driver	Points
	1	Chase Elliott	536
1	2	Ross Chastain	520 (–16)
1	3	Kyle Busch	513 (–23)
	4	Ryan Blaney	511 (–25)
1	5	Joey Logano	506 (–30)
1	6	Martin Truex Jr.	481 (–55)
	7	Kyle Larson	476 (–60)
1	8	William Byron	466 (–70)
1	9	Alex Bowman	460 (–76)
	10	Christopher Bell	444 (–92)
	11	Aric Almirola	423 (–113)
1	12	Kevin Harvick	416 (–120)
1	13	Chase Briscoe	386 (–150)
2	14	Tyler Reddick	381 (–155)
1	15	Austin Dillon	376 (–160)
1	16	Erik Jones	368 (–168)
Official driver's standings

Manufacturers' Championship standings

	Pos	Manufacturer	Points
	1	Chevrolet	582
1	2	Ford	541 (–41)
1	3	Toyota	540 (–42)

- Note: Only the first 16 positions are included for the driver standings.
- . – Driver has clinched a position in the NASCAR Cup Series playoffs.

== Notes ==
Previous race: 2022 Enjoy Illinois 300	NASCAR Cup Series; 2022 season	Next race: 2022 Ally 400
