= 2021 Bank of America Roval 400 =

NASCAR Cup Series race

Race details
- Race 32 of 36 in the 2021 NASCAR Cup Series
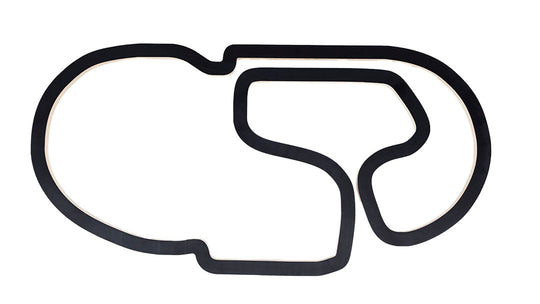
- Roval (2018–2023)
- Date: October 10, 2021
- Location: Charlotte Motor Speedway in Concord, North Carolina
- Course: Permanent racing facility
- Course length: 2.280 miles (3.669 km)
- Distance: 109 laps, 248.52 mi (400 km)
- Average speed: 77.783 miles per hour (125.180 km/h)

Pole position
Driver	Denny Hamlin	Joe Gibbs Racing
- Grid positions set by competition-based formula

Most laps led
Driver	William Byron	Hendrick Motorsports
- Laps: 30

Winner
No. 5	Kyle Larson	Hendrick Motorsports

Television in the United States
- Network: NBC
- Announcers: Rick Allen, Jeff Burton, Steve Letarte and Dale Earnhardt Jr.

Radio in the United States
- Radio: PRN
- Booth announcers: Doug Rice and Mark Garrow
- Turn announcers: Nick Yeoman (1, 2 & 3), Mike Jaynes (4, 5 & 6), Doug Turnbull (7, 8 & 9), Pat Patterson (10, 11 & 12) and Rob Albright (13, 14 & 15)

The 2021 Bank of America Roval 400 was a NASCAR Cup Series race held on October 10, 2021, at Charlotte Motor Speedway in Concord, North Carolina. Contested over 109 laps on the 2.28-mile (3.67 km) road course, it was the 32nd race of the 2021 NASCAR Cup Series season, the sixth race of the Playoffs, and final race of the Round of 12.

== Report ==
=== Background ===
An aerial view of Charlotte Motor Speedway

Since 2018, deviating from past NASCAR events at Charlotte, the race will utilize a road course configuration of Charlotte Motor Speedway, promoted and trademarked as the "Roval". The course is 2.28 miles (3.67 km) in length and features 17 turns, utilizing the infield road course and portions of the oval track. The race will be contested over a scheduled distance of 109 laps, 400 kilometres (250 mi).

During July 2018 tests on the road course, concerns were raised over drivers "cheating" the backstretch chicane on the course. The chicanes were modified with additional tire barriers and rumble strips in order to encourage drivers to properly drive through them, and NASCAR will enforce drive-through penalties on drivers who illegally "short-cut" parts of the course. The chicanes will not be used during restarts. In the summer of 2019, the bus stop on the backstretch was changed and deepened, becoming a permanent part of the circuit, compared to the previous year where it was improvised.

If a driver fails to legally make the backstretch bus stop, the driver must skip the frontstretch chicane and make a complete stop by the dotted line on the exit before being allowed to continue. A driver who misses the frontstretch chicane must stop before the exit.

On October 9, 2021, NASCAR removed six sets of six yellow and black rumble strips from the layout after Josh Bilicki's No. 07 car suffered catastrophic front end damage from one set of strips during the Xfinity race earlier that day.

==== Entry list ====
- (R) denotes rookie driver.
- (i) denotes driver who are ineligible for series driver points.

No.	Driver	Team	Manufacturer
00	Quin Houff	StarCom Racing	Chevrolet
1	Kurt Busch	Chip Ganassi Racing	Chevrolet
2	Brad Keselowski	Team Penske	Ford
3	Austin Dillon	Richard Childress Racing	Chevrolet
4	Kevin Harvick	Stewart-Haas Racing	Ford
5	Kyle Larson	Hendrick Motorsports	Chevrolet
6	Ryan Newman	Roush Fenway Racing	Ford
7	Corey LaJoie	Spire Motorsports	Chevrolet
8	Tyler Reddick	Richard Childress Racing	Chevrolet
9	Chase Elliott	Hendrick Motorsports	Chevrolet
10	Aric Almirola	Stewart-Haas Racing	Ford
11	Denny Hamlin	Joe Gibbs Racing	Toyota
12	Ryan Blaney	Team Penske	Ford
14	Chase Briscoe (R)	Stewart-Haas Racing	Ford
15	Josh Bilicki (i)	Rick Ware Racing	Ford
16	A. J. Allmendinger (i)	Kaulig Racing	Chevrolet
17	Chris Buescher	Roush Fenway Racing	Ford
18	Kyle Busch	Joe Gibbs Racing	Toyota
19	Martin Truex Jr.	Joe Gibbs Racing	Toyota
20	Christopher Bell	Joe Gibbs Racing	Toyota
21	Matt DiBenedetto	Wood Brothers Racing	Ford
22	Joey Logano	Team Penske	Ford
23	Bubba Wallace	23XI Racing	Toyota
24	William Byron	Hendrick Motorsports	Chevrolet
34	Michael McDowell	Front Row Motorsports	Ford
37	Ryan Preece	JTG Daugherty Racing	Chevrolet
38	Anthony Alfredo (R)	Front Row Motorsports	Ford
41	Cole Custer	Stewart-Haas Racing	Ford
42	Ross Chastain	Chip Ganassi Racing	Chevrolet
43	Erik Jones	Richard Petty Motorsports	Chevrolet
47	Ricky Stenhouse Jr.	JTG Daugherty Racing	Chevrolet
48	Alex Bowman	Hendrick Motorsports	Chevrolet
51	Cody Ware (i)	Petty Ware Racing	Chevrolet
52	Joey Hand	Rick Ware Racing	Ford
53	Garrett Smithley (i)	Rick Ware Racing	Chevrolet
66	Timmy Hill (i)	MBM Motorsports	Toyota
77	Justin Haley (i)	Spire Motorsports	Chevrolet
78	Scott Heckert	Live Fast Motorsports	Ford
99	Daniel Suárez	Trackhouse Racing Team	Chevrolet
Official entry list

== Qualifying ==
Denny Hamlin was awarded the pole for the race as determined by competition-based formula.

=== Starting Lineup ===
Pos	No.	Driver	Team	Manufacturer
1	11	Denny Hamlin	Joe Gibbs Racing	Toyota
2	2	Brad Keselowski	Team Penske	Ford
3	22	Joey Logano	Team Penske	Ford
4	20	Christopher Bell	Joe Gibbs Racing	Toyota
5	19	Martin Truex Jr.	Joe Gibbs Racing	Toyota
6	12	Ryan Blaney	Team Penske	Ford
7	4	Kevin Harvick	Stewart-Haas Racing	Ford
8	9	Chase Elliott	Hendrick Motorsports	Chevrolet
9	18	Kyle Busch	Joe Gibbs Racing	Toyota
10	5	Kyle Larson	Hendrick Motorsports	Chevrolet
11	24	William Byron	Hendrick Motorsports	Chevrolet
12	48	Alex Bowman	Hendrick Motorsports	Chevrolet
13	1	Kurt Busch	Chip Ganassi Racing	Chevrolet
14	3	Austin Dillon	Richard Childress Racing	Chevrolet
15	23	Bubba Wallace	23XI Racing	Toyota
16	17	Chris Buescher	Roush Fenway Racing	Ford
17	43	Erik Jones	Richard Petty Motorsports	Chevrolet
18	47	Ricky Stenhouse Jr.	JTG Daugherty Racing	Chevrolet
19	34	Michael McDowell	Front Row Motorsports	Ford
20	38	Anthony Alfredo (R)	Front Row Motorsports	Ford
21	10	Aric Almirola	Stewart-Haas Racing	Ford
22	14	Chase Briscoe (R)	Stewart-Haas Racing	Ford
23	41	Cole Custer	Stewart-Haas Racing	Ford
24	6	Ryan Newman	Roush Fenway Racing	Ford
25	99	Daniel Suárez	Trackhouse Racing Team	Chevrolet
26	7	Corey LaJoie	Spire Motorsports	Chevrolet
27	42	Ross Chastain	Chip Ganassi Racing	Chevrolet
28	00	Quin Houff	StarCom Racing	Chevrolet
29	8	Tyler Reddick	Richard Childress Racing	Chevrolet
30	21	Matt DiBenedetto	Wood Brothers Racing	Ford
31	37	Ryan Preece	JTG Daugherty Racing	Chevrolet
32	51	Cody Ware (i)	Petty Ware Racing	Chevrolet
33	16	A. J. Allmendinger (i)	Kaulig Racing	Chevrolet
34	53	Garrett Smithley (i)	Rick Ware Racing	Chevrolet
35	78	Scott Heckert	Live Fast Motorsports	Ford
36	52	Joey Hand	Rick Ware Racing	Ford
37	15	Josh Bilicki (i)	Rick Ware Racing	Ford
38	77	Justin Haley (i)	Spire Motorsports	Chevrolet
39	66	Timmy Hill (i)	MBM Motorsports	Toyota
Official starting lineup

== Race ==
=== Stage Results ===
Stage One Laps: 25

Pos	No	Driver	Team	Manufacturer	Points
1	9	Chase Elliott	Hendrick Motorsports	Chevrolet	10
2	16	A. J. Allmendinger (i)	Kaulig Racing	Chevrolet	0
3	12	Ryan Blaney	Team Penske	Ford	8
4	19	Martin Truex Jr.	Joe Gibbs Racing	Toyota	7
5	22	Joey Logano	Team Penske	Ford	6
6	1	Kurt Busch	Chip Ganassi Racing	Chevrolet	5
7	18	Kyle Busch	Joe Gibbs Racing	Toyota	4
8	24	William Byron	Hendrick Motorsports	Chevrolet	3
9	34	Michael McDowell	Front Row Motorsports	Ford	2
10	4	Kevin Harvick	Stewart-Haas Racing	Ford	1
Official stage one results

Stage Two Laps: 25

Pos	No	Driver	Team	Manufacturer	Points
1	18	Kyle Busch	Joe Gibbs Racing	Toyota	10
2	9	Chase Elliott	Hendrick Motorsports	Chevrolet	9
3	4	Kevin Harvick	Stewart-Haas Racing	Ford	8
4	12	Ryan Blaney	Team Penske	Ford	7
5	22	Joey Logano	Team Penske	Ford	6
6	5	Kyle Larson	Hendrick Motorsports	Chevrolet	5
7	2	Brad Keselowski	Team Penske	Ford	4
8	19	Martin Truex Jr.	Joe Gibbs Racing	Toyota	3
9	48	Alex Bowman	Hendrick Motorsports	Chevrolet	2
10	24	William Byron	Hendrick Motorsports	Chevrolet	1
Official stage two results

=== Final Stage Results ===
Stage Three Laps: 59

Pos	Grid	No	Driver	Team	Manufacturer	Laps	Points
1	10	5	Kyle Larson	Hendrick Motorsports	Chevrolet	109	45
2	29	8	Tyler Reddick	Richard Childress Racing	Chevrolet	109	35
3	16	17	Chris Buescher	Roush Fenway Racing	Ford	109	34
4	9	18	Kyle Busch	Joe Gibbs Racing	Toyota	109	47
5	1	11	Denny Hamlin	Joe Gibbs Racing	Toyota	109	32
6	30	21	Matt DiBenedetto	Wood Brothers Racing	Ford	109	31
7	3	22	Joey Logano	Team Penske	Ford	109	42
8	4	20	Christopher Bell	Joe Gibbs Racing	Toyota	109	29
9	6	12	Ryan Blaney	Team Penske	Ford	109	43
10	12	48	Alex Bowman	Hendrick Motorsports	Chevrolet	109	29
11	11	24	William Byron	Hendrick Motorsports	Chevrolet	109	30
12	8	9	Chase Elliott	Hendrick Motorsports	Chevrolet	109	44
13	25	99	Daniel Suárez	Trackhouse Racing Team	Chevrolet	109	24
14	15	23	Bubba Wallace	23XI Racing	Toyota	109	23
15	14	3	Austin Dillon	Richard Childress Racing	Chevrolet	109	22
16	19	34	Michael McDowell	Front Row Motorsports	Ford	109	23
17	17	43	Erik Jones	Richard Petty Motorsports	Chevrolet	109	20
18	23	41	Cole Custer	Stewart-Haas Racing	Ford	109	19
19	31	37	Ryan Preece	JTG Daugherty Racing	Chevrolet	109	18
20	2	2	Brad Keselowski	Team Penske	Ford	109	21
21	18	47	Ricky Stenhouse Jr.	JTG Daugherty Racing	Chevrolet	109	16
22	22	14	Chase Briscoe (R)	Stewart-Haas Racing	Ford	109	15
23	27	42	Ross Chastain	Chip Ganassi Racing	Chevrolet	109	14
24	21	10	Aric Almirola	Stewart-Haas Racing	Ford	109	13
25	13	1	Kurt Busch	Chip Ganassi Racing	Chevrolet	109	17
26	20	38	Anthony Alfredo (R)	Front Row Motorsports	Ford	109	11
27	36	52	Joey Hand	Rick Ware Racing	Ford	109	10
28	37	15	Josh Bilicki (i)	Rick Ware Racing	Ford	109	0
29	5	19	Martin Truex Jr.	Joe Gibbs Racing	Toyota	109	18
30	28	00	Quin Houff	StarCom Racing	Chevrolet	109	7
31	35	78	Scott Heckert	Live Fast Motorsports	Ford	109	6
32	39	66	Timmy Hill (i)	MBM Motorsports	Toyota	108	0
33	7	4	Kevin Harvick	Stewart-Haas Racing	Ford	98	13
34	34	53	Garrett Smithley (i)	Rick Ware Racing	Chevrolet	96	0
35	26	7	Corey LaJoie	Spire Motorsports	Chevrolet	93	2
36	32	51	Cody Ware (i)	Petty Ware Racing	Chevrolet	90	0
37	38	77	Justin Haley (i)	Spire Motorsports	Chevrolet	66	0
38	33	16	A. J. Allmendinger (i)	Kaulig Racing	Chevrolet	57	0
39	24	6	Ryan Newman	Roush Fenway Racing	Ford	19	1
Official race results

=== Race statistics ===
- Lead changes: 15 among 10 different drivers
- Cautions/Laps: 9 for 18
- Red flags: 0
- Time of race: 3 hours, 15 minutes and 4 seconds
- Average speed: 77.783 miles per hour (125.180 km/h)

== Media ==
=== Television ===
NBC Sports covered the race on the television side. Rick Allen, Jeff Burton, Steve Letarte and Dale Earnhardt Jr. called the race from the broadcast booth. Dave Burns, Parker Kligerman and Marty Snider handled the pit road duties from pit lane. Rutledge Wood handled the features from the track.

NBC
Booth announcers	Pit reporters	Features reporter
Lap-by-lap: Rick Allen; Color-commentator: Jeff Burton; Color-commentator: Steve Letarte; Color-commentator: Dale Earnhardt Jr.	Dave Burns; Parker Kligerman; Marty Snider	Rutledge Wood

=== Radio ===
The Performance Racing Network had the radio call for the race, which was also simulcasted on Sirius XM NASCAR Radio. Doug Rice and Mark Garrow called the race from the booth when the field raced down the front straightaway. IMS Radio's Nick Yeoman was assigned the entrance to the road course and into the Bank of America bridge (Turns 1-3). Voice of the Indianapolis 500 Mark Jaynes was assigned the action from the Bank of America bridge to the middle of the infield section. Doug Turnbull called the action exiting in infield into the oval Turn 1 banking (Turns 7-9). Pat Patterson called the action on the backstretch and into the bus stop. Rob Albright was assigned to the oval Turn 3-4 end. (Turns 13-15). Brad Gillie, Brett McMillan and Wendy Venturini had the call from the pit area for PRN.

PRN
Booth announcers	Turn announcers	Pit reporters
Lead announcer: Doug Rice; Announcer: Mark Garrow	Infield entrance: Nick Yeoman; Middle of Infield: Mark Jaynes; Exit of Infield: Doug Turnbull; Oval 2 to Bus Stop Pat Patterson; Oval 3/4: Rob Albright	Brad Gillie; Brett McMillan; Wendy Venturini

== Standings after the race ==
Drivers' Championship standings

	Pos	Driver	Points
1	1	Kyle Larson	4,065
1	2	Denny Hamlin	4,030 (–35)
2	3	Martin Truex Jr.	4,029 (–36)
2	4	Ryan Blaney	4,024 (–41)
3	5	Kyle Busch	4,023 (–42)
1	6	Chase Elliott	4,022 (–43)
1	7	Joey Logano	4,013 (–52)
4	8	Brad Keselowski	4,008 (–57)
	9	Kevin Harvick	2,209 (–1,856)
	10	Christopher Bell	2,164 (–1,901)
2	11	Kurt Busch	2,163 (–1,902)
2	12	Tyler Reddick	2,160 (–1,905)
2	13	William Byron	2,133 (–1,932)
2	14	Alex Bowman	2,131 (–1,934)
	15	Aric Almirola	2,117 (–1,948)
	16	Michael McDowell	2,087 (–1,978)
Official driver's standings

Manufacturers' Championship standings

Pos	Manufacturer	Points
1	Chevrolet	1,176
2	Toyota	1,103 (–73)
3	Ford	1,102 (–74)

- Note: Only the first 16 positions are included for the driver standings.

Previous race: 2021 YellaWood 500	NASCAR Cup Series; 2021 season	Next race: 2021 Autotrader EchoPark Automotive 500
