= 2018 Overton's 300 =

15th race of the 2018 NASCAR Xfinity Series

Race details
- Race 15 of 33 in the 2018 NASCAR Xfinity Series
- Date: June 30, 2018
- Official name: 18th Annual Overton's 300
- Location: Joliet, Illinois, Chicagoland Speedway
- Course: Permanent racing facility
- Course length: 1.5 miles (2.41 km)
- Distance: 200 laps, 300 mi (482.803 km)
- Scheduled distance: 200 laps, 300 mi (482.803 km)
- Average speed: 134.764 miles per hour (216.882 km/h)

Pole position
Driver	Kyle Larson	Chip Ganassi Racing
- Time: 31.071

Most laps led
Driver	Kyle Larson	Chip Ganassi Racing
- Laps: 80

Winner
No. 42	Kyle Larson	Chip Ganassi Racing

Television in the United States
- Network: NBCSN
- Announcers: Rick Allen, Jeff Burton, Steve Letarte, Dale Earnhardt Jr.

Radio in the United States
- Radio: Motor Racing Network

The 2018 Overton's 300 was the 15th stock car race of the 2018 NASCAR Xfinity Series season and the 18th iteration of the event. The race was held on Saturday, June 30, 2018, in Joliet, Illinois at Chicagoland Speedway, a 1.5 miles (2.4 km) permanent D-shaped oval. The race took the scheduled 200 laps to complete. At race's end, Kyle Larson of Chip Ganassi Racing would come back from the rear of the field to win his tenth career NASCAR Xfinity Series win and his second of his part-time season. To fill out the podium, Kevin Harvick and Cole Custer of Stewart-Haas Racing with Biagi-DenBeste would finish second and third, respectively.

== Background ==
The layout of Chicagoland Speedway, the venue where the race was held.

Chicagoland Speedway is a 1.5-mile (2.4 km) tri-oval speedway in Joliet, Illinois, southwest of Chicago. The speedway opened in 2001 and currently hosts NASCAR races. Until 2011, the speedway also hosted the IndyCar Series, recording numerous close finishes, including the closest finish in IndyCar history. The speedway is owned and operated by International Speedway Corporation and is located adjacent to Route 66 Raceway.

=== Entry list ===
#	Driver	Team	Make	Sponsor
0	Garrett Smithley	JD Motorsports	Chevrolet	Trophy Tractor, FAME USA
00	Cole Custer	Stewart-Haas Racing with Biagi-DenBeste	Ford	Haas Automation
1	Elliott Sadler	JR Motorsports	Chevrolet	OneMain Financial "Lending Done Human"
01	Vinnie Miller	JD Motorsports	Chevrolet	Gerber Collision & Glass
2	Matt Tifft	Richard Childress Racing	Chevrolet	Surface Sunscreen, Fanatics
3	Jeb Burton	Richard Childress Racing	Chevrolet	Estes
4	Ross Chastain	JD Motorsports	Chevrolet	Gerber Collision & Glass
5	Michael Annett	JR Motorsports	Chevrolet	Pilot Flying J
7	Justin Allgaier	JR Motorsports	Chevrolet	Brandt Professional Agriculture
8	Blake Jones	B. J. McLeod Motorsports	Chevrolet	Tennessee XXX Moonshine
9	Tyler Reddick	JR Motorsports	Chevrolet	Takl
11	Ryan Truex	Kaulig Racing	Chevrolet	Phantom Fireworks
12	Austin Cindric	Team Penske	Ford	Menards, Mastercraft Doors
13	Timmy Hill	MBM Motorsports	Toyota	O.C.R. Gaz Bar
15	B. J. McLeod	JD Motorsports	Chevrolet	JD Motorsports
16	Ryan Reed	Roush Fenway Racing	Ford	DriveDownA1C.com
18	Daniel Suárez	Joe Gibbs Racing	Toyota	Juniper Networks
19	Brandon Jones	Joe Gibbs Racing	Toyota	Menards, Jeld-Wen
20	Christopher Bell	Joe Gibbs Racing	Toyota	Rheem
21	Daniel Hemric	Richard Childress Racing	Chevrolet	South Point Hotel, Casino & Spa
22	Paul Menard	Team Penske	Ford	Discount Tire
23	Chase Elliott	GMS Racing	Chevrolet	Untuckit
35	Joey Gase	Go Green Racing with SS-Green Light Racing	Chevrolet	Sparks Energy
36	Alex Labbé	DGM Racing	Chevrolet	Wholey's, Can-Am
38	Jeff Green	RSS Racing	Chevrolet	Superior Essex, Anixter
39	Ryan Sieg	RSS Racing	Chevrolet	PYT Sports
40	Chad Finchum	MBM Motorsports	Toyota	Smithbilt Homes
42	Kyle Larson	Chip Ganassi Racing	Chevrolet	Eneos
45	Josh Bilicki	JP Motorsports	Toyota	Prevagen
51	Jeremy Clements	Jeremy Clements Racing	Chevrolet	RepairableVehicles.com
52	David Starr	Jimmy Means Racing	Chevrolet	Chasco
55	Brandon Hightower	JP Motorsports	Toyota	Jack Doheny Companies, Cane River Brewing Company
60	Chase Briscoe	Roush Fenway Racing	Ford	NutriChomps
61	Kaz Grala	Fury Race Cars	Ford	IT Coalition, Kiklos
66	John Jackson	MBM Motorsports	Dodge	CrashClaimsR.Us
74	Mike Harmon	Mike Harmon Racing	Chevrolet	Shadow Warriors Project, Horizon Transport
76	Spencer Boyd	SS-Green Light Racing	Chevrolet	Grunt Style "This We'll Defend"
78	Scott Heckert	B. J. McLeod Motorsports	Chevrolet	JW Transport
89	Morgan Shepherd	Shepherd Racing Ventures	Chevrolet	Visone RV, Racing with Jesus
90	Josh Williams	DGM Racing	Chevrolet	Sleep Well Sleep Disorder Specialists
93	Jeff Green	RSS Racing	Chevrolet	RSS Racing
98	Kevin Harvick	Stewart-Haas Racing with Biagi-DenBeste	Ford	Hunt Brothers Pizza
Official entry list

== Practice ==
=== First practice ===
The first practice session was held on Friday, June 29, at 3:35 p.m. CST, and would last for 45 minutes. Christopher Bell of Joe Gibbs Racing would set the fastest time in the session, with a time of 31.329 and an average speed of 172.364 miles per hour (277.393 km/h).

Pos.	#	Driver	Team	Make	Time	Speed
1	20	Christopher Bell	Joe Gibbs Racing	Toyota	31.329	172.364
2	12	Austin Cindric	Team Penske	Ford	31.438	171.767
3	9	Tyler Reddick	JR Motorsports	Chevrolet	31.440	171.756
Full first practice results

=== Second and final practice ===
The second and final practice session, sometimes referred to as Happy Hour, was held on Friday, June 29, at 6:35 p.m. CST, and would last for 45 minutes. Christopher Bell of Joe Gibbs Racing would set the fastest time in the session, with a time of 31.072 and an average speed of 173.790 miles per hour (279.688 km/h).

Pos.	#	Driver	Team	Make	Time	Speed
1	20	Christopher Bell	Joe Gibbs Racing	Toyota	31.072	173.790
2	18	Daniel Suárez	Joe Gibbs Racing	Toyota	31.373	172.123
3	22	Paul Menard	Team Penske	Ford	31.383	172.068
Full Happy Hour practice results

== Qualifying ==
Qualifying was held on Saturday, June 30, at 11:40 a.m. CST. Since Chicagoland Speedway is under 2 miles (3.2 km), the qualifying system was a multi-car system that included three rounds. The first round was 15 minutes, where every driver would be able to set a lap within the 15 minutes. Then, the second round would consist of the fastest 24 cars in Round 1, and drivers would have 10 minutes to set a lap. Round 3 consisted of the fastest 12 drivers from Round 2, and the drivers would have 5 minutes to set a time. Whoever was fastest in Round 3 would win the pole.

Kyle Larson of Chip Ganassi Racing would win the pole, setting a time of 31.071 and an average speed of 173.796 miles per hour (279.698 km/h).

Two drivers would fail to qualify: Morgan Shepherd and Mike Harmon.

=== Full qualifying results ===
Pos.	#	Driver	Team	Make	Time (R1)	Speed (R1)	Time (R2)	Speed (R2)	Time (R3)	Speed (R3)
1	42	Kyle Larson	Chip Ganassi Racing	Chevrolet	30.947	174.492	31.064	173.835	31.071	173.796
2	9	Tyler Reddick	JR Motorsports	Chevrolet	31.143	173.394	31.187	173.149	31.135	173.438
3	12	Austin Cindric	Team Penske	Ford	31.226	172.933	31.244	172.833	31.151	173.349
4	18	Daniel Suárez	Joe Gibbs Racing	Toyota	31.163	173.282	31.115	173.550	31.199	173.082
5	22	Paul Menard	Team Penske	Ford	31.132	173.455	31.268	172.701	31.250	172.800
6	19	Brandon Jones	Joe Gibbs Racing	Toyota	31.211	173.016	31.270	172.689	31.320	172.414
7	2	Matt Tifft	Richard Childress Racing	Chevrolet	31.122	173.511	31.205	173.049	31.346	172.271
8	1	Elliott Sadler	JR Motorsports	Chevrolet	31.616	170.800	31.287	172.596	31.348	172.260
9	23	Chase Elliott	GMS Racing	Chevrolet	31.273	172.673	31.257	172.761	31.386	172.051
10	21	Daniel Hemric	Richard Childress Racing	Chevrolet	31.116	173.544	31.048	173.924	31.403	171.958
11	20	Christopher Bell	Joe Gibbs Racing	Toyota	31.084	173.723	31.282	172.623	31.426	171.832
12	00	Cole Custer	Stewart-Haas Racing with Biagi-DenBeste	Ford	31.127	173.483	31.281	172.629	—	—
Eliminated in Round 2
13	98	Kevin Harvick	Stewart-Haas Racing with Biagi-DenBeste	Ford	31.118	173.533	31.319	172.419	—	—
14	3	Jeb Burton	Richard Childress Racing	Chevrolet	31.379	172.090	31.437	171.772	—	—
15	11	Ryan Truex	Kaulig Racing	Chevrolet	31.087	173.706	31.477	171.554	—	—
16	16	Ryan Reed	Roush Fenway Racing	Ford	31.576	171.016	31.478	171.548	—	—
17	60	Chase Briscoe	Roush Fenway Racing	Ford	31.815	169.731	31.523	171.303	—	—
18	7	Justin Allgaier	JR Motorsports	Chevrolet	31.257	172.761	31.550	171.157	—	—
19	5	Michael Annett	JR Motorsports	Chevrolet	31.653	170.600	31.567	171.065	—	—
20	61	Kaz Grala	Fury Race Cars	Ford	31.711	170.288	31.664	170.541	—	—
21	39	Ryan Sieg	RSS Racing	Chevrolet	31.757	170.041	31.771	169.966	—	—
22	36	Alex Labbé	DGM Racing	Chevrolet	31.842	169.587	32.011	168.692	—	—
23	4	Ross Chastain	JD Motorsports	Chevrolet	31.512	171.363	—	—	—	—
24	51	Jeremy Clements	Jeremy Clements Racing	Chevrolet	31.680	170.455	—	—	—	—
Eliminated in Round 1
25	0	Garrett Smithley	JD Motorsports	Chevrolet	31.913	169.210	—	—	—	—
26	38	J. J. Yeley	RSS Racing	Chevrolet	31.925	169.146	—	—	—	—
27	35	Joey Gase	Go Green Racing with SS-Green Light Racing	Chevrolet	32.100	168.224	—	—	—	—
28	13	Timmy Hill	MBM Motorsports	Toyota	32.163	167.895	—	—	—	—
29	52	David Starr	Jimmy Means Racing	Chevrolet	32.293	167.219	—	—	—	—
30	15	B. J. McLeod	JD Motorsports	Chevrolet	32.324	167.059	—	—	—	—
31	93	Jeff Green	RSS Racing	Chevrolet	32.364	166.852	—	—	—	—
32	8	Blake Jones	B. J. McLeod Motorsports	Chevrolet	32.587	165.710	—	—	—	—
33	90	Josh Williams	DGM Racing	Chevrolet	32.724	165.017	—	—	—	—
Qualified by owner's points
34	40	Chad Finchum	MBM Motorsports	Toyota	32.768	164.795	—	—	—	—
35	45	Josh Bilicki	JP Motorsports	Toyota	32.776	164.755	—	—	—	—
36	76	Spencer Boyd	SS-Green Light Racing	Chevrolet	32.796	164.654	—	—	—	—
37	55	Brandon Hightower	JP Motorsports	Toyota	32.875	164.259	—	—	—	—
38	66	John Jackson	MBM Motorsports	Dodge	32.895	164.159	—	—	—	—
39	78	Scott Heckert	B. J. McLeod Motorsports	Chevrolet	33.036	163.458	—	—	—	—
40	01	Vinnie Miller	JD Motorsports	Chevrolet	33.372	161.812	—	—	—	—
Failed to qualify
41	89	Morgan Shepherd	Shepherd Racing Ventures	Chevrolet	33.184	162.729	—	—	—	—
42	74	Mike Harmon	Mike Harmon Racing	Chevrolet	33.261	162.352	—	—	—	—
Official qualifying results

== Race results ==
Stage 1 Laps: 45

Pos.	#	Driver	Team	Make	Pts
1	9	Tyler Reddick	JR Motorsports	Chevrolet	10
2	20	Christopher Bell	Joe Gibbs Racing	Toyota	9
3	98	Kevin Harvick	Stewart-Haas Racing with Biagi-DenBeste	Ford	0
4	18	Daniel Suárez	Joe Gibbs Racing	Toyota	0
5	21	Daniel Hemric	Richard Childress Racing	Chevrolet	6
6	42	Kyle Larson	Chip Ganassi Racing	Chevrolet	0
7	19	Brandon Jones	Joe Gibbs Racing	Toyota	4
8	22	Paul Menard	Team Penske	Ford	0
9	12	Austin Cindric	Team Penske	Ford	2
10	1	Elliott Sadler	JR Motorsports	Chevrolet	1

Stage 2 Laps: 45

Pos.	#	Driver	Team	Make	Pts
1	42	Kyle Larson	Chip Ganassi Racing	Chevrolet	0
2	98	Kevin Harvick	Stewart-Haas Racing with Biagi-DenBeste	Ford	0
3	20	Christopher Bell	Joe Gibbs Racing	Toyota	8
4	00	Cole Custer	Stewart-Haas Racing with Biagi-DenBeste	Ford	7
5	22	Paul Menard	Team Penske	Ford	0
6	7	Justin Allgaier	JR Motorsports	Chevrolet	5
7	9	Tyler Reddick	JR Motorsports	Chevrolet	4
8	21	Daniel Hemric	Richard Childress Racing	Chevrolet	3
9	19	Brandon Jones	Joe Gibbs Racing	Toyota	2
10	1	Elliott Sadler	JR Motorsports	Chevrolet	1

Stage 3 Laps: 110

Fin	St	#	Driver	Team	Make	Laps	Led	Status	Pts
1	1	42	Kyle Larson	Chip Ganassi Racing	Chevrolet	200	80	running	0
2	13	98	Kevin Harvick	Stewart-Haas Racing with Biagi-DenBeste	Ford	200	38	running	0
3	12	00	Cole Custer	Stewart-Haas Racing with Biagi-DenBeste	Ford	200	0	running	41
4	4	18	Daniel Suárez	Joe Gibbs Racing	Toyota	200	13	running	0
5	10	21	Daniel Hemric	Richard Childress Racing	Chevrolet	200	0	running	41
6	8	1	Elliott Sadler	JR Motorsports	Chevrolet	200	0	running	33
7	18	7	Justin Allgaier	JR Motorsports	Chevrolet	200	0	running	35
8	5	22	Paul Menard	Team Penske	Ford	200	0	running	0
9	17	60	Chase Briscoe	Roush Fenway Racing	Ford	200	2	running	28
10	9	23	Chase Elliott	GMS Racing	Chevrolet	200	0	running	0
11	6	19	Brandon Jones	Joe Gibbs Racing	Toyota	200	11	running	32
12	11	20	Christopher Bell	Joe Gibbs Racing	Toyota	199	21	running	42
13	23	4	Ross Chastain	JD Motorsports	Chevrolet	199	0	running	24
14	3	12	Austin Cindric	Team Penske	Ford	199	0	running	25
15	15	11	Ryan Truex	Kaulig Racing	Chevrolet	199	0	running	22
16	7	2	Matt Tifft	Richard Childress Racing	Chevrolet	199	0	running	21
17	24	51	Jeremy Clements	Jeremy Clements Racing	Chevrolet	199	0	running	20
18	26	38	J. J. Yeley	RSS Racing	Chevrolet	197	0	running	19
19	25	0	Garrett Smithley	JD Motorsports	Chevrolet	196	0	running	18
20	21	39	Ryan Sieg	RSS Racing	Chevrolet	196	0	running	17
21	22	36	Alex Labbé	DGM Racing	Chevrolet	196	0	running	16
22	27	35	Joey Gase	Go Green Racing with SS-Green Light Racing	Chevrolet	195	0	running	15
23	29	52	David Starr	Jimmy Means Racing	Chevrolet	194	0	running	14
24	32	8	Blake Jones	B. J. McLeod Motorsports	Chevrolet	194	0	running	13
25	30	15	B. J. McLeod	JD Motorsports	Chevrolet	191	0	running	12
26	37	55	Brandon Hightower	JP Motorsports	Toyota	190	0	running	11
27	40	01	Vinnie Miller	JD Motorsports	Chevrolet	178	0	running	10
28	39	78	Scott Heckert	B. J. McLeod Motorsports	Chevrolet	146	0	electrical	9
29	36	76	Spencer Boyd	SS-Green Light Racing	Chevrolet	134	0	suspension	8
30	19	5	Michael Annett	JR Motorsports	Chevrolet	130	0	crash	7
31	33	90	Josh Williams	DGM Racing	Chevrolet	117	0	brakes	6
32	16	16	Ryan Reed	Roush Fenway Racing	Ford	105	0	crash	5
33	2	9	Tyler Reddick	JR Motorsports	Chevrolet	99	35	crash	18
34	14	3	Jeb Burton	Richard Childress Racing	Chevrolet	99	0	crash	3
35	35	45	Josh Bilicki	JP Motorsports	Toyota	83	0	fuel pump	2
36	38	66	John Jackson	MBM Motorsports	Dodge	63	0	suspension	1
37	28	13	Timmy Hill	MBM Motorsports	Toyota	52	0	suspension	1
38	34	40	Chad Finchum	MBM Motorsports	Toyota	23	0	engine	1
39	31	93	Jeff Green	RSS Racing	Chevrolet	2	0	fuel pump	1
40	20	61	Kaz Grala	Fury Race Cars	Ford	1	0	electrical	1
Failed to qualify
41		89	Morgan Shepherd	Shepherd Racing Ventures	Chevrolet				
42		74	Mike Harmon	Mike Harmon Racing	Chevrolet				
Official race results

Previous race: 2018 Iowa 250	NASCAR Xfinity Series; 2018 season	Next race: 2018 Coca-Cola Firecracker 250
