= 2018 Zippo 200 at The Glen =

20th race of the 2018 NASCAR Xfinity Series

Race details
- Race 20 of 33 of the 2018 NASCAR Xfinity Series
- Date: August 4, 2018
- Official name: 24th Annual Zippo 200 at The Glen
- Location: Watkins Glen, New York, Watkins Glen International
- Course: Permanent racing facility
- Course length: 2.454 miles (3.949 km)
- Distance: 82 laps, 200.9 mi (323.317 km)
- Scheduled distance: 82 laps, 200.9 mi (323.317 km)
- Average speed: 81.685 miles per hour (131.459 km/h)

Pole position
Driver	Joey Logano	Team Penske
- Time: 1:11.710

Most laps led
Driver	Joey Logano	Team Penske
- Laps: 31

Winner
No. 22	Joey Logano	Team Penske

Television in the United States
- Network: NBC
- Announcers: Rick Allen, Jeff Burton, Steve Letarte, Dale Earnhardt Jr.

Radio in the United States
- Radio: Motor Racing Network

The 2018 Zippo 200 at The Glen was the 20th stock car race of the 2018 NASCAR Xfinity Series season, and the 24th iteration of the event. The race was held on Saturday, August 4, 2018, in Watkins Glen, New York at Watkins Glen International, a 2.45-mile (3.94 km) permanent road course. The race took the scheduled 82 laps to complete. At race's end, Joey Logano of Team Penske would dominate the race to win his 30th career NASCAR Xfinity Series win and his second and final win of the season. To fill out the podium, A. J. Allmendinger of GMS Racing and Justin Allgaier of JR Motorsports would finish second and third, respectively.

== Background ==
Watkins Glen International (nicknamed "The Glen") is an automobile race track located in Watkins Glen, New York at the southern tip of Seneca Lake. It was long known around the world as the home of the Formula One United States Grand Prix, which it hosted for twenty consecutive years (1961–1980), but the site has been home to road racing of nearly every class, including the World Sportscar Championship, Trans-Am, Can-Am, NASCAR Sprint Cup Series, the International Motor Sports Association and the IndyCar Series.

Initially, public roads in the village were used for the race course. In 1956 a permanent circuit for the race was built. In 1968 the race was extended to six hours, becoming the 6 Hours of Watkins Glen. The circuit's current layout has more or less been the same since 1971, although a chicane was installed at the uphill Esses in 1975 to slow cars through these corners, where there was a fatality during practice at the 1973 United States Grand Prix. The chicane was removed in 1985, but another chicane called the "Inner Loop" was installed in 1992 after J.D. McDuffie's fatal accident during the previous year's NASCAR Winston Cup event.

The circuit is known as the Mecca of North American road racing and is a very popular venue among fans and drivers. The facility is currently owned by International Speedway Corporation.

=== Entry list ===
#	Driver	Team	Make	Sponsor
0	Garrett Smithley	JD Motorsports	Chevrolet	JD Motorsports
00	Cole Custer	Stewart-Haas Racing with Biagi-DenBeste	Ford	Haas Automation
1	Elliott Sadler	JR Motorsports	Chevrolet	Textron, Arctic Cat
01	Vinnie Miller	JD Motorsports	Chevrolet	JD Motorsports
2	Matt Tifft	Richard Childress Racing	Chevrolet	Tunity "Hear Any Muted TV"
3	Austin Dillon	Richard Childress Racing	Chevrolet	Cabela's, Bass Pro Shops
4	Ross Chastain	JD Motorsports	Chevrolet	Buckle Up New York "Protect Your Melon"
5	Michael Annett	JR Motorsports	Chevrolet	TMC Transportation
7	Justin Allgaier	JR Motorsports	Chevrolet	Brandt Professional Agriculture
8	Scott Heckert	B. J. McLeod Motorsports	Chevrolet	B. J. McLeod Motorsports
9	Tyler Reddick	JR Motorsports	Chevrolet	Nationwide Children's Hospital
11	Ryan Truex	Kaulig Racing	Chevrolet	LeafFilter Gutter Protection
12	Brad Keselowski	Team Penske	Ford	Wabash National Supreme
13	Carl Long*	MBM Motorsports	Dodge	OCR Gaz Bar
15	Mike Skeen	JD Motorsports	Chevrolet	JD Motorsports
16	Ryan Reed	Roush Fenway Racing	Ford	DriveDownA1C.com
17	Victor Gonzalez Jr.	Niece Motorsports	Chevrolet	PMC Group
18	Ryan Preece	Joe Gibbs Racing	Toyota	Craftsman
19	Brandon Jones	Joe Gibbs Racing	Toyota	Mobil 1, Toyota Service Centers
20	Christopher Bell	Joe Gibbs Racing	Toyota	Rheem
21	Daniel Hemric	Richard Childress Racing	Chevrolet	South Point Hotel, Casino & Spa
22	Joey Logano	Team Penske	Ford	Snap-on
23	A. J. Allmendinger	GMS Racing	Chevrolet	ISM Connect
24	Justin Haley	GMS Racing	Chevrolet	Fraternal Order of Eagles
35	Joey Gase	Go Green Racing with SS-Green Light Racing	Chevrolet	Sparks Energy
36	Alex Labbé	DGM Racing	Chevrolet	La Rue Industrial Snowblowers
38	Jeff Green	RSS Racing	Chevrolet	RSS Racing
39	Ryan Sieg	RSS Racing	Chevrolet	Midstate Basement Authorities
40	Chad Finchum	MBM Motorsports	Toyota	Smithbilt Homes
42	Kyle Larson	Chip Ganassi Racing	Chevrolet	Chevrolet Accessories
45	Josh Bilicki	JP Motorsports	Toyota	Prevagen
51	Jeremy Clements	Jeremy Clements Racing	Chevrolet	RepairableVehicles.com
52	David Starr	Jimmy Means Racing	Chevrolet	Extreme Kleaner
55	David Levine*	JP Motorsports	Toyota	Prevagen
60	Austin Cindric	Roush Fenway Racing	Ford	LTi Printing
61	Kaz Grala	Fury Race Cars	Ford	DMB Financial
66	Timmy Hill	MBM Motorsports	Dodge	CrashClaimsR.Us
74	Stephen Leicht	Mike Harmon Racing	Chevrolet	Shadow Warriors Project, Horizon Transport
76	Spencer Boyd	SS-Green Light Racing	Chevrolet	Grunt Style "This We'll Defend"
78	Tommy Joe Martins	B. J. McLeod Motorsports	Chevrolet	B. J. McLeod Motorsports
89	Morgan Shepherd*	Shepherd Racing Ventures	Chevrolet	Visone RV
90	Brian Henderson	DGM Racing	Chevrolet	Friends of Jaclyn Foundation
93	Jeff Green	RSS Racing	Chevrolet	RSS Racing
98	Aric Almirola	Stewart-Haas Racing with Biagi-DenBeste	Ford	Go Bowling
Official entry list

*Withdrew.

== Practice ==
=== First practice ===
The first practice session would occur on Friday, August 3, at 12:35 PM EST and would last for 50 minutes. Heavy rain pelted the session, leaving only six teams making a lap as most felt that it wasn't worth the risk. Tyler Reddick of JR Motorsports would set the fastest time in the session, with a lap of 1:38.533 and an average speed of 89.513 miles per hour (144.057 km/h).

Pos.	#	Driver	Team	Make	Time	Speed
1	9	Tyler Reddick	JR Motorsports	Chevrolet	1:38.533	89.513
2	60	Austin Cindric	Roush-Fenway Racing	Ford	1:38.720	89.344
3	24	Justin Haley	GMS Racing	Chevrolet	1:41.506	86.891
Full first practice results

=== Second and final practice ===
The second practice session would occur on Friday, August 3, at 2:05 PM EST and would last for one hour and 20 minutes. Once again, rain would majorly affect the session, leaving many teams not making a lap. Mike Skeen of JD Motorsports would set the fastest time in the session, with a lap of 1:32.240 and an average speed of 95.620 miles per hour (153.885 km/h).

Pos.	#	Driver	Team	Make	Time	Speed
1	15	Mike Skeen	JD Motorsports	Chevrolet	1:32.240	95.620
2	61	Kaz Grala	Fury Race Cars	Ford	1:33.309	94.525
3	36	Alex Labbé	DGM Racing	Chevrolet	1:34.353	93.479
Full Happy Hour practice results

== Qualifying ==
Qualifying would occur on Saturday, August 4, at 11:35 AM EST. Since the Watkins Glen International is a road course, the qualifying system was a multi-car system that included two rounds. The first round was 25 minutes, where every driver would be able to set a lap within the 25 minutes. Then, the second round would consist of the fastest 12 cars in Round 1, and drivers would have 10 minutes to set a lap. Whoever set the fastest time in Round 2 would win the pole.

Joey Logano of Team Penske would win the pole, with a lap of 1:11.710 and an average speed of 122.995 miles per hour (197.941 km/h) in the second round.

One driver would fail to qualify: Stephen Leicht.

=== Full qualifying results ===
Pos.	#	Driver	Team	Make	Time (R1)	Speed (R1)	Time (R2)	Speed (R2)
1	22	Joey Logano	Team Penske	Ford	1:12.154	122.239	1:11.710	122.995
2	12	Brad Keselowski	Team Penske	Ford	1:13.156	120.564	1:12.073	122.376
3	42	Kyle Larson	Chip Ganassi Racing	Chevrolet	1:13.031	120.771	1:12.294	122.002
4	23	A. J. Allmendinger	GMS Racing	Chevrolet	1:12.894	120.998	1:12.513	121.633
5	21	Daniel Hemric	Richard Childress Racing	Chevrolet	1:12.954	120.898	1:12.526	121.612
6	3	Austin Dillon	Richard Childress Racing	Chevrolet	1:13.076	120.696	1:12.669	121.372
7	11	Ryan Truex	Kaulig Racing	Chevrolet	1:12.924	120.948	1:12.789	121.172
8	18	Ryan Preece	Joe Gibbs Racing	Toyota	1:12.942	120.918	1:12.824	121.114
9	98	Aric Almirola	Stewart-Haas Racing with Biagi-DenBeste	Ford	1:13.029	120.774	1:12.866	121.044
10	7	Justin Allgaier	JR Motorsports	Chevrolet	1:12.667	121.376	1:12.905	120.979
11	20	Christopher Bell	Joe Gibbs Racing	Toyota	1:13.299	120.329	1:13.142	120.587
12	00	Cole Custer	Stewart-Haas Racing with Biagi-DenBeste	Ford	1:13.244	120.419	1:13.221	120.457
Eliminated in Round 1
13	1	Elliott Sadler	JR Motorsports	Chevrolet	1:13.301	120.326	—	—
14	60	Austin Cindric	Roush-Fenway Racing	Ford	1:13.465	120.057	—	—
15	51	Jeremy Clements	Jeremy Clements Racing	Chevrolet	1:13.505	119.992	—	—
16	2	Matt Tifft	Richard Childress Racing	Chevrolet	1:13.533	119.946	—	—
17	61	Kaz Grala	Fury Race Cars	Ford	1:13.598	119.840	—	—
18	24	Justin Haley	GMS Racing	Chevrolet	1:13.660	119.739	—	—
19	16	Ryan Reed	Roush-Fenway Racing	Ford	1:13.681	119.705	—	—
20	19	Brandon Jones	Joe Gibbs Racing	Toyota	1:13.977	119.226	—	—
21	36	Alex Labbé	DGM Racing	Chevrolet	1:14.047	119.114	—	—
22	8	Scott Heckert	B. J. McLeod Motorsports	Chevrolet	1:14.333	118.655	—	—
23	4	Ross Chastain	JD Motorsports	Chevrolet	1:14.402	118.545	—	—
24	15	Mike Skeen	JD Motorsports	Chevrolet	1:14.468	118.440	—	—
25	5	Michael Annett	JR Motorsports	Chevrolet	1:14.606	118.221	—	—
26	38	J. J. Yeley	RSS Racing	Chevrolet	1:14.659	118.137	—	—
27	9	Tyler Reddick	JR Motorsports	Chevrolet	1:15.050	117.522	—	—
28	39	Ryan Sieg	RSS Racing	Chevrolet	1:15.090	117.459	—	—
29	17	Victor Gonzalez Jr.	Niece Motorsports	Chevrolet	1:15.808	116.347	—	—
30	78	Tommy Joe Martins	B. J. McLeod Motorsports	Chevrolet	1:15.867	116.256	—	—
31	66	Timmy Hill	MBM Motorsports	Dodge	1:16.338	115.539	—	—
32	0	Garrett Smithley	JD Motorsports	Chevrolet	1:16.681	115.022	—	—
33	93	Jeff Green	RSS Racing	Chevrolet	1:17.153	114.318	—	—
Qualified by owner's points
34	52	David Starr	Jimmy Means Racing	Chevrolet	1:17.641	113.600	—	—
35	40	Chad Finchum	MBM Motorsports	Toyota	1:18.413	112.481	—	—
36	90	Brian Henderson	DGM Racing	Chevrolet	1:18.520	112.328	—	—
37	35	Joey Gase	Go Green Racing with SS-Green Light Racing	Chevrolet	1:18.956	111.708	—	—
38	45	Josh Bilicki	JP Motorsports	Toyota	1:19.907	110.378	—	—
39	76	Spencer Boyd	SS-Green Light Racing	Chevrolet	1:20.084	110.134	—	—
40	01	Vinnie Miller	JD Motorsports	Chevrolet	1:20.659	109.349	—	—
Failed to qualify or withdrew
41	74	Stephen Leicht	Mike Harmon Racing	Dodge	1:18.413	112.481		
WD	13	Carl Long	MBM Motorsports	Toyota	—	—	—	—
WD	55	David Levine	JP Motorsports	Toyota	—	—	—	—
WD	89	Morgan Shepherd	Shepherd Racing Ventures	Chevrolet	—	—	—	—
Official qualifying results
Official starting lineup

== Race results ==
Stage 1 Laps: 20

Fin	#	Driver	Team	Make	Pts
1	22	Joey Logano	Team Penske	Ford	0
2	42	Kyle Larson	Chip Ganassi Racing	Chevrolet	0
3	21	Daniel Hemric	Richard Childress Racing	Chevrolet	8
4	7	Justin Allgaier	JR Motorsports	Chevrolet	7
5	18	Ryan Preece	Joe Gibbs Racing	Toyota	6
6	11	Ryan Truex	Kaulig Racing	Chevrolet	5
7	51	Jeremy Clements	Jeremy Clements Racing	Chevrolet	4
8	3	Austin Dillon	Richard Childress Racing	Chevrolet	0
9	61	Kaz Grala	Fury Race Cars	Ford	2
10	9	Tyler Reddick	JR Motorsports	Chevrolet	1

Stage 2 Laps: 20

Fin	#	Driver	Team	Make	Pts
1	23	A. J. Allmendinger	GMS Racing	Chevrolet	0
2	7	Justin Allgaier	JR Motorsports	Chevrolet	9
3	42	Kyle Larson	Chip Ganassi Racing	Chevrolet	0
4	20	Christopher Bell	Joe Gibbs Racing	Toyota	7
5	21	Daniel Hemric	Richard Childress Racing	Chevrolet	6
6	22	Joey Logano	Team Penske	Ford	0
7	12	Brad Keselowski	Team Penske	Ford	0
8	4	Ross Chastain	JD Motorsports	Chevrolet	3
9	16	Ryan Reed	Roush-Fenway Racing	Ford	2
10	18	Ryan Preece	Joe Gibbs Racing	Toyota	1

Stage 3 Laps: 42

Fin	St	#	Driver	Team	Make	Laps	Led	Status	Pts
1	1	22	Joey Logano	Team Penske	Ford	82	31	running	0
2	4	23	A. J. Allmendinger	GMS Racing	Chevrolet	82	11	running	0
3	10	7	Justin Allgaier	JR Motorsports	Chevrolet	82	0	running	50
4	8	18	Ryan Preece	Joe Gibbs Racing	Toyota	82	8	running	40
5	9	98	Aric Almirola	Stewart-Haas Racing with Biagi-DenBeste	Ford	82	0	running	0
6	12	00	Cole Custer	Stewart-Haas Racing with Biagi-DenBeste	Ford	82	0	running	31
7	20	19	Brandon Jones	Joe Gibbs Racing	Toyota	82	0	running	30
8	19	16	Ryan Reed	Roush-Fenway Racing	Ford	82	0	running	31
9	11	20	Christopher Bell	Joe Gibbs Racing	Toyota	82	0	running	35
10	2	12	Brad Keselowski	Team Penske	Ford	82	26	running	0
11	27	9	Tyler Reddick	JR Motorsports	Chevrolet	82	1	running	27
12	13	1	Elliott Sadler	JR Motorsports	Chevrolet	82	0	running	25
13	14	60	Austin Cindric	Roush-Fenway Racing	Ford	82	0	running	24
14	15	51	Jeremy Clements	Jeremy Clements Racing	Chevrolet	82	1	running	27
15	17	61	Kaz Grala	Fury Race Cars	Ford	82	0	running	24
16	5	21	Daniel Hemric	Richard Childress Racing	Chevrolet	82	0	running	35
17	25	5	Michael Annett	JR Motorsports	Chevrolet	82	0	running	20
18	7	11	Ryan Truex	Kaulig Racing	Chevrolet	82	0	running	24
19	21	36	Alex Labbé	DGM Racing	Chevrolet	82	4	running	18
20	23	4	Ross Chastain	JD Motorsports	Chevrolet	82	0	running	20
21	36	90	Brian Henderson	DGM Racing	Chevrolet	82	0	running	16
22	37	35	Joey Gase	Go Green Racing with SS-Green Light Racing	Chevrolet	82	0	running	15
23	32	0	Garrett Smithley	JD Motorsports	Chevrolet	82	0	running	14
24	39	76	Spencer Boyd	SS-Green Light Racing	Chevrolet	81	0	running	13
25	6	3	Austin Dillon	Richard Childress Racing	Chevrolet	78	0	running	0
26	28	39	Ryan Sieg	RSS Racing	Chevrolet	77	0	engine	11
27	3	42	Kyle Larson	Chip Ganassi Racing	Chevrolet	77	0	engine	0
28	24	15	Mike Skeen	JD Motorsports	Chevrolet	76	0	running	9
29	35	40	Chad Finchum	MBM Motorsports	Toyota	74	0	running	8
30	22	8	Scott Heckert	B. J. McLeod Motorsports	Chevrolet	73	0	running	7
31	29	17	Victor Gonzalez Jr.	Niece Motorsports	Chevrolet	70	0	running	6
32	38	45	Josh Bilicki	JP Motorsports	Toyota	69	0	running	5
33	34	52	David Starr	Jimmy Means Racing	Chevrolet	49	0	suspension	4
34	26	38	J. J. Yeley	RSS Racing	Chevrolet	45	0	brakes	3
35	40	01	Vinnie Miller	JD Motorsports	Chevrolet	32	0	crash	2
36	31	66	Timmy Hill	MBM Motorsports	Dodge	27	0	rear gear	1
37	16	2	Matt Tifft	Richard Childress Racing	Chevrolet	26	0	crash	1
38	18	24	Justin Haley	GMS Racing	Chevrolet	26	0	crash	0
39	33	93	Jeff Green	RSS Racing	Chevrolet	8	0	brakes	1
40	30	78	Tommy Joe Martins	B. J. McLeod Motorsports	Chevrolet	3	0	crash	1
Failed to qualify or withdrew
41		74	Stephen Leicht	Mike Harmon Racing	Dodge				
WD		13	Carl Long	MBM Motorsports	Toyota				
WD		55	David Levine	JP Motorsports	Toyota				
WD		89	Morgan Shepherd	Shepherd Racing Ventures	Chevrolet				
Official race results

Previous race: 2018 U.S. Cellular 250	NASCAR Xfinity Series; 2018 season	Next race: 2018 Rock N Roll Tequila 170
