= 2021 Ally 400 =

NASCAR Cup Series race

Race details
- Race 17 of 36 in the 2021 NASCAR Cup Series
- Date: June 20, 2021
- Location: Nashville Superspeedway in Lebanon, Tennessee
- Course: Permanent racing facility
- Course length: 1.333 miles (2.145 km)
- Distance: 300 laps, 400 mi (640 km)
- Average speed: 113.792 miles per hour (183.130 km/h)

Pole position
Driver	Aric Almirola	Stewart-Haas Racing
- Time: 29.557

Most laps led
Driver	Kyle Larson	Hendrick Motorsports
- Laps: 264

Winner
No. 5	Kyle Larson	Hendrick Motorsports

Television in the United States
- Network: NBCSN
- Announcers: Rick Allen, Jeff Burton, Steve Letarte and Dale Earnhardt Jr.
- Nielsen ratings: 1.46/2.590 million

Radio in the United States
- Radio: MRN
- Booth announcers: Alex Hayden and Jeff Striegle
- Turn announcers: Dave Moody (1–2) and Kyle Rickey (3–4)

The 2021 Ally 400 was a NASCAR Cup Series race held on June 20, 2021, at Nashville Superspeedway in Lebanon, Tennessee. Contested over 300 laps on the 1.333-mile (2.145 km) superspeedway, it was the 17th race of the 2021 NASCAR Cup Series season.

== Report ==
The program cover for the 2021 Ally 400.

=== Background ===
Nashville Superspeedway is a motor racing complex located in Gladeville, Tennessee (though the track has a Lebanon address), United States, about 30 miles (48 km) southeast of Nashville. The track was built in 2001 and is currently used for events, driving schools and GT Academy, a reality television competition.

It is a concrete oval track 1 1/3 miles (2.145 km) long. Nashville Superspeedway is owned by Dover Motorsports, Inc., which also owns Dover International Speedway. Nashville Superspeedway was the longest concrete oval in NASCAR during the time it was on the NASCAR Xfinity Series and NASCAR Camping World Truck Series circuits. Current permanent seating capacity is approximately 25,000. Additional portable seats are brought in for some events, and seating capacity can be expanded to 150,000. Infrastructure is in place to expand the facility to include a short track, drag strip, and road course.

On June 3, NASCAR confirmed the track would reopen to host a Cup race in 2021, replacing one of the two Dover dates.

==== Entry list ====
- (R) denotes rookie driver.
- (i) denotes driver who are ineligible for series driver points.

No.	Driver	Team	Manufacturer
00	Quin Houff	StarCom Racing	Chevrolet
1	Kurt Busch	Chip Ganassi Racing	Chevrolet
2	Brad Keselowski	Team Penske	Ford
3	Austin Dillon	Richard Childress Racing	Chevrolet
4	Kevin Harvick	Stewart-Haas Racing	Ford
5	Kyle Larson	Hendrick Motorsports	Chevrolet
6	Ryan Newman	Roush Fenway Racing	Ford
7	Corey LaJoie	Spire Motorsports	Chevrolet
8	Tyler Reddick	Richard Childress Racing	Chevrolet
9	Chase Elliott	Hendrick Motorsports	Chevrolet
10	Aric Almirola	Stewart-Haas Racing	Ford
11	Denny Hamlin	Joe Gibbs Racing	Toyota
12	Ryan Blaney	Team Penske	Ford
13	David Starr (i)	MBM Motorsports	Toyota
14	Chase Briscoe (R)	Stewart-Haas Racing	Ford
15	Joey Gase (i)	Rick Ware Racing	Chevrolet
17	Chris Buescher	Roush Fenway Racing	Ford
18	Kyle Busch	Joe Gibbs Racing	Toyota
19	Martin Truex Jr.	Joe Gibbs Racing	Toyota
20	Christopher Bell	Joe Gibbs Racing	Toyota
21	Matt DiBenedetto	Wood Brothers Racing	Ford
22	Joey Logano	Team Penske	Ford
23	Bubba Wallace	23XI Racing	Toyota
24	William Byron	Hendrick Motorsports	Chevrolet
34	Michael McDowell	Front Row Motorsports	Ford
37	Ryan Preece	JTG Daugherty Racing	Chevrolet
38	Anthony Alfredo (R)	Front Row Motorsports	Ford
41	Cole Custer	Stewart-Haas Racing	Ford
42	Ross Chastain	Chip Ganassi Racing	Chevrolet
43	Erik Jones	Richard Petty Motorsports	Chevrolet
47	Ricky Stenhouse Jr.	JTG Daugherty Racing	Chevrolet
48	Alex Bowman	Hendrick Motorsports	Chevrolet
51	J. J. Yeley (i)	Petty Ware Racing	Chevrolet
52	Josh Bilicki	Rick Ware Racing	Ford
53	Garrett Smithley (i)	Rick Ware Racing	Chevrolet
66	Chad Finchum (i)	MBM Motorsports	Toyota
77	Justin Haley (i)	Spire Motorsports	Chevrolet
78	B. J. McLeod (i)	Live Fast Motorsports	Ford
99	Daniel Suárez	Trackhouse Racing Team	Chevrolet
Official entry list

== Practice ==
Hendrick Motorsport teammates William Byron & Kyle Larson were the fastest in the practice session with a time of 29.724 seconds and a speed of 161.082 mph (259.236 km/h).

=== Practice results ===
Pos	No.	Driver	Team	Manufacturer	Time	Speed
1	24	William Byron	Hendrick Motorsports	Chevrolet	29.724	161.082
2	5	Kyle Larson	Hendrick Motorsports	Chevrolet	29.724	161.082
3	9	Chase Elliott	Hendrick Motorsports	Chevrolet	29.735	161.022
Official practice results

== Qualifying ==
Aric Almirola scored the pole for the race with a time of 29.557 seconds and a speed of 161.992 mph (260.701 km/h).

=== Qualifying results ===
Pos	No.	Driver	Team	Manufacturer	Time
1	10	Aric Almirola	Stewart-Haas Racing	Ford	29.557
2	18	Kyle Busch	Joe Gibbs Racing	Toyota	29.572
3	22	Joey Logano	Team Penske	Ford	29.583
4	24	William Byron	Hendrick Motorsports	Chevrolet	29.612
5	5	Kyle Larson	Hendrick Motorsports	Chevrolet	29.648
6	9	Chase Elliott	Hendrick Motorsports	Chevrolet	29.722
7	41	Cole Custer	Stewart-Haas Racing	Ford	29.752
8	48	Alex Bowman	Hendrick Motorsports	Chevrolet	29.811
9	43	Erik Jones	Richard Petty Motorsports	Chevrolet	29.835
10	12	Ryan Blaney	Team Penske	Ford	29.837
11	21	Matt DiBenedetto	Wood Brothers Racing	Ford	29.839
12	4	Kevin Harvick	Stewart-Haas Racing	Ford	29.898
13	11	Denny Hamlin	Joe Gibbs Racing	Toyota	29.905
14	47	Ricky Stenhouse Jr.	JTG Daugherty Racing	Chevrolet	29.925
15	2	Brad Keselowski	Team Penske	Ford	29.934
16	14	Chase Briscoe (R)	Stewart-Haas Racing	Ford	29.945
17	17	Chris Buescher	Roush Fenway Racing	Ford	29.986
18	38	Anthony Alfredo (R)	Front Row Motorsports	Ford	29.998
19	42	Ross Chastain	Chip Ganassi Racing	Chevrolet	30.003
20	37	Ryan Preece	JTG Daugherty Racing	Chevrolet	30.027
21	23	Bubba Wallace	23XI Racing	Toyota	30.048
22	99	Daniel Suárez	Trackhouse Racing Team	Chevrolet	30.098
23	34	Michael McDowell	Front Row Motorsports	Ford	30.104
24	7	Corey LaJoie	Spire Motorsports	Chevrolet	30.144
25	20	Christopher Bell	Joe Gibbs Racing	Toyota	30.169
26	8	Tyler Reddick	Richard Childress Racing	Chevrolet	30.207
27	77	Justin Haley (i)	Spire Motorsports	Chevrolet	30.215
28	3	Austin Dillon	Richard Childress Racing	Chevrolet	30.235
29	6	Ryan Newman	Roush Fenway Racing	Ford	30.250
30	1	Kurt Busch	Chip Ganassi Racing	Chevrolet	30.299
31	78	B. J. McLeod (i)	Live Fast Motorsports	Ford	30.375
32	51	J. J. Yeley (i)	Rick Ware Racing	Chevrolet	30.555
33	66	Chad Finchum (i)	MBM Motorsports	Toyota	30.804
34	52	Josh Bilicki	Rick Ware Racing	Ford	30.821
35	19	Martin Truex Jr.	Joe Gibbs Racing	Toyota	30.931
36	53	Garrett Smithley (i)	Rick Ware Racing	Chevrolet	31.091
37	15	Joey Gase (i)	Rick Ware Racing	Chevrolet	31.145
38	13	David Starr (i)	MBM Motorsports	Toyota	31.691
39	00	Quin Houff	StarCom Racing	Chevrolet	0.000
Official qualifying results

== Race ==
=== Stage Results ===
Stage One Laps: 90

Pos	No	Driver	Team	Manufacturer	Points
1	1	Kurt Busch	Chip Ganassi Racing	Chevrolet	10
2	5	Kyle Larson	Hendrick Motorsports	Chevrolet	9
3	99	Daniel Suárez	Trackhouse Racing Team	Chevrolet	8
4	18	Kyle Busch	Joe Gibbs Racing	Toyota	7
5	3	Austin Dillon	Richard Childress Racing	Chevrolet	6
6	47	Ricky Stenhouse Jr.	JTG Daugherty Racing	Chevrolet	5
7	2	Brad Keselowski	Team Penske	Ford	4
8	22	Joey Logano	Team Penske	Ford	3
9	21	Matt DiBenedetto	Wood Brothers Racing	Ford	2
10	11	Denny Hamlin	Joe Gibbs Racing	Toyota	1
Official stage one results

Stage Two Laps: 95

Pos	No	Driver	Team	Manufacturer	Points
1	5	Kyle Larson	Hendrick Motorsports	Chevrolet	10
2	3	Austin Dillon	Richard Childress Racing	Chevrolet	9
3	14	Chase Briscoe (R)	Stewart-Haas Racing	Ford	8
4	24	William Byron	Hendrick Motorsports	Chevrolet	7
5	18	Kyle Busch	Joe Gibbs Racing	Toyota	6
6	11	Denny Hamlin	Joe Gibbs Racing	Toyota	5
7	47	Ricky Stenhouse Jr.	JTG Daugherty Racing	Chevrolet	4
8	10	Aric Almirola	Stewart-Haas Racing	Ford	3
9	4	Kevin Harvick	Stewart-Haas Racing	Ford	2
10	1	Kurt Busch	Chip Ganassi Racing	Chevrolet	1
Official stage two results

=== Final Stage Results ===
Stage Three Laps: 115

Pos	Grid	No	Driver	Team	Manufacturer	Laps	Points
1	5	5	Kyle Larson	Hendrick Motorsports	Chevrolet	300	59
2	19	42	Ross Chastain	Chip Ganassi Racing	Chevrolet	300	35
3	4	24	William Byron	Hendrick Motorsports	Chevrolet	300	41
4	1	10	Aric Almirola	Stewart-Haas Racing	Ford	300	36
5	12	4	Kevin Harvick	Stewart-Haas Racing	Ford	300	34
6	14	47	Ricky Stenhouse Jr.	JTG Daugherty Racing	Chevrolet	300	40
7	22	99	Daniel Suárez	Trackhouse Racing Team	Chevrolet	300	38
8	30	1	Kurt Busch	Chip Ganassi Racing	Chevrolet	300	40
9	25	20	Christopher Bell	Joe Gibbs Racing	Toyota	300	28
10	3	22	Joey Logano	Team Penske	Ford	300	30
11	2	18	Kyle Busch	Joe Gibbs Racing	Toyota	300	39
12	28	3	Austin Dillon	Richard Childress Racing	Chevrolet	300	40
13	29	6	Ryan Newman	Roush Fenway Racing	Ford	300	24
14	8	48	Alex Bowman	Hendrick Motorsports	Chevrolet	300	23
15	24	7	Corey LaJoie	Spire Motorsports	Chevrolet	300	22
16	23	34	Michael McDowell	Front Row Motorsports	Ford	300	21
17	18	38	Anthony Alfredo (R)	Front Row Motorsports	Ford	300	20
18	26	8	Tyler Reddick	Richard Childress Racing	Chevrolet	300	19
19	9	43	Erik Jones	Richard Petty Motorsports	Chevrolet	300	18
20	21	23	Bubba Wallace	23XI Racing	Toyota	299	17
21	13	11	Denny Hamlin	Joe Gibbs Racing	Toyota	299	22
22	35	19	Martin Truex Jr.	Joe Gibbs Racing	Toyota	299	15
23	15	2	Brad Keselowski	Team Penske	Ford	299	18
24	11	21	Matt DiBenedetto	Wood Brothers Racing	Ford	298	15
25	36	53	Garrett Smithley (i)	Rick Ware Racing	Chevrolet	298	0
26	34	52	Josh Bilicki	Rick Ware Racing	Ford	298	11
27	32	51	J. J. Yeley (i)	Petty Ware Racing	Chevrolet	298	0
28	31	78	B. J. McLeod (i)	Live Fast Motorsports	Ford	295	0
29	37	15	Joey Gase (i)	Rick Ware Racing	Chevrolet	295	0
30	7	41	Cole Custer	Stewart-Haas Racing	Ford	252	7
31	16	14	Chase Briscoe (R)	Stewart-Haas Racing	Ford	227	14
32	20	37	Ryan Preece	JTG Daugherty Racing	Chevrolet	197	5
33	33	66	Chad Finchum (i)	MBM Motorsports	Toyota	143	0
34	38	13	David Starr (i)	MBM Motorsports	Toyota	126	0
35	27	77	Justin Haley (i)	Spire Motorsports	Chevrolet	79	0
36	17	17	Chris Buescher	Roush Fenway Racing	Ford	77	1
37	10	12	Ryan Blaney	Team Penske	Ford	53	1
38	39	00	Quin Houff	StarCom Racing	Chevrolet	0	1
DSQ	6	9	Chase Elliott (Note: Elliott initially finished 13th, but was disqualified for unsecured tires (five loose lug nuts; three is grounds for disqualification).)	Hendrick Motorsports	Chevrolet	300	1
Official race results

=== Race statistics ===
- Lead changes: 14 among 7 different drivers
- Cautions/Laps: 11 for 60
- Red flags: 0
- Time of race: 3 hours, 30 minutes and 23 seconds
- Average speed: 113.792 miles per hour (183.130 km/h)

== Media ==
=== Television ===
NBC Sports covered the race on the television side. Rick Allen, Jeff Burton, Steve Letarte and Dale Earnhardt Jr. called the race from the broadcast booth. Parker Kligerman, Marty Snider and Kelli Stavast handled the pit road duties from pit lane. Rutledge Wood handled the features from the track.

NBCSN
Booth announcers	Pit reporters	Features reporter
Lap-by-lap: Rick Allen; Color-commentator: Jeff Burton; Color-commentator: Steve Letarte; Color-commentator: Dale Earnhardt Jr.	Parker Kligerman; Marty Snider; Kelli Stavast	Rutledge Wood

=== Radio ===
Radio coverage of the race was broadcast by Motor Racing Network (MRN) and simulcast on Sirius XM NASCAR Radio.

MRN
Booth announcers	Turn announcers	Pit reporters
Lead announcer: Alex Hayden; Announcer: Jeff Striegle	Turns 1 & 2: Dave Moody; Turns 3 & 4: Kyle Rickey	Steve Post; Kim Coon

=== Social Media ===
The race was attended by many social media influencers including John P. Clark lll

== Standings after the race ==
Drivers' Championship standings

	Pos	Driver	Points
	1	Denny Hamlin	686
	2	Kyle Larson	676 (–10)
1	3	William Byron	605 (–81)
1	4	Chase Elliott	592 (–94)
	5	Joey Logano	578 (–108)
1	6	Kyle Busch	559 (–127)
1	7	Martin Truex Jr.	542 (–144)
1	8	Kevin Harvick	517 (–169)
1	9	Ryan Blaney	510 (–176)
	10	Brad Keselowski	491 (–195)
1	11	Austin Dillon	476 (–210)
1	12	Alex Bowman	470 (–216)
	13	Tyler Reddick	417 (–269)
1	14	Christopher Bell	392 (–294)
1	15	Chris Buescher	392 (–294)
	16	Michael McDowell	376 (–310)
Official driver's standings

Manufacturers' Championship standings

Pos	Manufacturer	Points
1	Chevrolet	627
2	Ford	589 (–38)
3	Toyota	575 (–52)

- Note: Only the first 16 positions are included for the driver standings.
- . – Driver has clinched a position in the NASCAR Cup Series playoffs.

== Notes ==
Previous race: 2021 Toyota/Save Mart 350	NASCAR Cup Series; 2021 season	Next race: 2021 Pocono Organics CBD 325
