= 2021 YellaWood 500 =

NASCAR Cup Series race

Race details
- Race 31 of 36 in the 2021 NASCAR Cup Series
- Date: October 4, 2021
- Location: Talladega Superspeedway in Lincoln, Alabama
- Course: Permanent racing facility
- Course length: 2.66 miles (4.28 km)
- Distance: 117 laps, 311.22 mi (500.859 km)
- Scheduled distance: 188 laps, 500.08 mi (804.8 km)
- Average speed: 130.218 miles per hour (209.566 km/h)

Pole position
Driver	Denny Hamlin	Joe Gibbs Racing
- Grid positions set by competition-based formula

Most laps led
Driver	Kevin Harvick	Stewart-Haas Racing
- Laps: 16

Winner
No. 23	Bubba Wallace	23XI Racing

Television in the United States
- Network: NBCSN
- Announcers: Rick Allen, Jeff Burton, Steve Letarte and Dale Earnhardt Jr.

Radio in the United States
- Radio: MRN
- Booth announcers: Alex Hayden, Jeff Striegle and Rusty Wallace
- Turn announcers: Dave Moody (1 & 2), Mike Bagley (Backstretch) and Kyle Rickey (3 & 4)

The 2021 YellaWood 500 was a NASCAR Cup Series race held on October 4, 2021, at Talladega Superspeedway in Lincoln, Alabama. Originally scheduled for 188 laps on the 2.66 mi (4.28 km) asphalt superspeedway, the race was shortened to 117 laps by rain. It was the 31st race of the 2021 NASCAR Cup Series season, the fifth race of the Playoffs, and the second race of the Round of 12. The race was postponed from Sunday, October 3 to Monday, October 4, due to rain. Bubba Wallace took his first victory in the NASCAR Cup Series. It was the first time since the development of the 2014 NASCAR Playoffs format that a driver not in either level of playoffs had won a race, and the first non-playoff driver to win a race since the 2013 Talladega playoff race, as well the first win for an African-American driver in the Cup Series since Wendell Scott's win in 1963.

It was the shortest Cup Series race at Talladega Superspeedway, and only the fourth Cup Series race to be shortened at Talladega (the May 1974 race was shortened to 170 laps due to the Energy Crisis, the May 1987 race was shortened to 178 laps by darkness after catch fencing had to be repaired, and the July 1996 race was shortened to 129 laps because of a long rain delay and subsequent darkness). It was the third of five national series races to be shortened in 2021 at Talladega.

== Report ==
=== Background ===
Talladega Superspeedway, the track where the race was held.

The 2021 YellaWood 500 program cover.

Talladega Superspeedway, originally known as Alabama International Motor Superspeedway (AIMS), is a motorsports complex located north of Talladega, Alabama. It is located on the former Anniston Air Force Base in the small city of Lincoln. The track is a tri-oval and was constructed in the 1960s by the International Speedway Corporation, a business controlled by the France family. Talladega is most known for its steep banking and the unique location of the start/finish line that's located just past the exit to pit road. The track currently hosts the NASCAR series such as the NASCAR Cup Series, Xfinity Series and the Camping World Truck Series. Talladega is the longest NASCAR oval with a length of 2.66-mile-long (4.28 km) tri-oval like the Daytona International Speedway, which also is a 2.5-mile-long (4 km) tri-oval.

==== Entry list ====
- (R) denotes rookie driver.
- (i) denotes driver who are ineligible for series driver points.

No.	Driver	Team	Manufacturer
00	Quin Houff	StarCom Racing	Chevrolet
1	Kurt Busch	Chip Ganassi Racing	Chevrolet
2	Brad Keselowski	Team Penske	Ford
3	Austin Dillon	Richard Childress Racing	Chevrolet
4	Kevin Harvick	Stewart-Haas Racing	Ford
5	Kyle Larson	Hendrick Motorsports	Chevrolet
6	Ryan Newman	Roush Fenway Racing	Ford
7	Corey LaJoie	Spire Motorsports	Chevrolet
8	Tyler Reddick	Richard Childress Racing	Chevrolet
9	Chase Elliott	Hendrick Motorsports	Chevrolet
10	Aric Almirola	Stewart-Haas Racing	Ford
11	Denny Hamlin	Joe Gibbs Racing	Toyota
12	Ryan Blaney	Team Penske	Ford
14	Chase Briscoe (R)	Stewart-Haas Racing	Ford
15	Garrett Smithley (i)	Rick Ware Racing	Chevrolet
16	Justin Haley (i)	Kaulig Racing	Chevrolet
17	Chris Buescher	Roush Fenway Racing	Ford
18	Kyle Busch	Joe Gibbs Racing	Toyota
19	Martin Truex Jr.	Joe Gibbs Racing	Toyota
20	Christopher Bell	Joe Gibbs Racing	Toyota
21	Matt DiBenedetto	Wood Brothers Racing	Ford
22	Joey Logano	Team Penske	Ford
23	Bubba Wallace	23XI Racing	Toyota
24	William Byron	Hendrick Motorsports	Chevrolet
34	Michael McDowell	Front Row Motorsports	Ford
37	Ryan Preece	JTG Daugherty Racing	Chevrolet
38	Anthony Alfredo (R)	Front Row Motorsports	Ford
41	Cole Custer	Stewart-Haas Racing	Ford
42	Ross Chastain	Chip Ganassi Racing	Chevrolet
43	Erik Jones	Richard Petty Motorsports	Chevrolet
47	Ricky Stenhouse Jr.	JTG Daugherty Racing	Chevrolet
48	Alex Bowman	Hendrick Motorsports	Chevrolet
51	Cody Ware (i)	Petty Ware Racing	Chevrolet
52	Josh Bilicki	Rick Ware Racing	Ford
53	Joey Gase (i)	Rick Ware Racing	Ford
66	James Davison	MBM Motorsports	Ford
77	Justin Allgaier (i)	Spire Motorsports	Chevrolet
78	B. J. McLeod (i)	Live Fast Motorsports	Ford
96	Landon Cassill (i)	Gaunt Brothers Racing	Toyota
99	Daniel Suárez	Trackhouse Racing Team	Chevrolet
Official entry list

== Qualifying ==
Denny Hamlin was awarded the pole for the race as determined by competition-based formula.

=== Starting Lineup ===
Pos	No.	Driver	Team	Manufacturer
1	11	Denny Hamlin	Joe Gibbs Racing	Toyota
2	18	Kyle Busch	Joe Gibbs Racing	Toyota
3	9	Chase Elliott	Hendrick Motorsports	Chevrolet
4	12	Ryan Blaney	Team Penske	Ford
5	5	Kyle Larson	Hendrick Motorsports	Chevrolet
6	19	Martin Truex Jr.	Joe Gibbs Racing	Toyota
7	2	Brad Keselowski	Team Penske	Ford
8	22	Joey Logano	Team Penske	Ford
9	4	Kevin Harvick	Stewart-Haas Racing	Ford
10	24	William Byron	Hendrick Motorsports	Chevrolet
11	48	Alex Bowman	Hendrick Motorsports	Chevrolet
12	20	Christopher Bell	Joe Gibbs Racing	Toyota
13	8	Tyler Reddick	Richard Childress Racing	Chevrolet
14	1	Kurt Busch	Chip Ganassi Racing	Chevrolet
15	21	Matt DiBenedetto	Wood Brothers Racing	Ford
16	3	Austin Dillon	Richard Childress Racing	Chevrolet
17	14	Chase Briscoe (R)	Stewart-Haas Racing	Ford
18	99	Daniel Suárez	Trackhouse Racing Team	Chevrolet
19	23	Bubba Wallace	23XI Racing	Toyota
20	10	Aric Almirola	Stewart-Haas Racing	Ford
21	47	Ricky Stenhouse Jr.	JTG Daugherty Racing	Chevrolet
22	34	Michael McDowell	Front Row Motorsports	Ford
23	42	Ross Chastain	Chip Ganassi Racing	Chevrolet
24	17	Chris Buescher	Roush Fenway Racing	Ford
25	6	Ryan Newman	Roush Fenway Racing	Ford
26	43	Erik Jones	Richard Petty Motorsports	Chevrolet
27	37	Ryan Preece	JTG Daugherty Racing	Chevrolet
28	41	Cole Custer	Stewart-Haas Racing	Ford
29	7	Corey LaJoie	Spire Motorsports	Chevrolet
30	38	Anthony Alfredo (R)	Front Row Motorsports	Ford
31	51	Cody Ware (i)	Petty Ware Racing	Chevrolet
32	78	B. J. McLeod (i)	Live Fast Motorsports	Ford
33	77	Justin Allgaier (i)	Spire Motorsports	Chevrolet
34	52	Josh Bilicki	Rick Ware Racing	Ford
35	00	Quin Houff	StarCom Racing	Chevrolet
36	53	Joey Gase (i)	Rick Ware Racing	Ford
37	15	Garrett Smithley (i)	Rick Ware Racing	Chevrolet
38	16	Justin Haley (i)	Kaulig Racing	Chevrolet
39	66	James Davison	MBM Motorsports	Ford
40	96	Landon Cassill (i)	Gaunt Brothers Racing	Toyota
Official starting lineup

== Race ==
=== Stage Results ===
Stage One Laps: 60

Pos	No	Driver	Team	Manufacturer	Points
1	17	Chris Buescher	Roush Fenway Racing	Ford	10
2	22	Joey Logano	Team Penske	Ford	9
3	2	Brad Keselowski	Team Penske	Ford	8
4	4	Kevin Harvick	Stewart-Haas Racing	Ford	7
5	8	Tyler Reddick	Richard Childress Racing	Chevrolet	6
6	12	Ryan Blaney	Team Penske	Ford	5
7	9	Chase Elliott	Hendrick Motorsports	Chevrolet	4
8	42	Ross Chastain	Chip Ganassi Racing	Chevrolet	3
9	1	Kurt Busch	Chip Ganassi Racing	Chevrolet	2
10	48	Alex Bowman	Hendrick Motorsports	Chevrolet	1
Official stage one results

Stage Two Laps: 57

Pos	Grid	No	Driver	Team	Manufacturer	Laps	Points
1	19	23	Bubba Wallace	23XI Racing	Toyota	117	50
2	7	2	Brad Keselowski	Team Penske	Ford	117	52
3	8	22	Joey Logano	Team Penske	Ford	117	51
4	14	1	Kurt Busch	Chip Ganassi Racing	Chevrolet	117	42
5	12	20	Christopher Bell	Joe Gibbs Racing	Toyota	117	38
6	24	17	Chris Buescher	Roush Fenway Racing	Ford	117	46
7	1	11	Denny Hamlin	Joe Gibbs Racing	Toyota	117	34
8	9	4	Kevin Harvick	Stewart-Haas Racing	Ford	117	39
9	26	43	Erik Jones	Richard Petty Motorsports	Chevrolet	117	30
10	30	38	Anthony Alfredo (R)	Front Row Motorsports	Ford	117	28
11	16	3	Austin Dillon	Richard Childress Racing	Chevrolet	117	26
12	6	19	Martin Truex Jr.	Joe Gibbs Racing	Toyota	117	25
13	28	41	Cole Custer	Stewart-Haas Racing	Ford	117	24
14	17	14	Chase Briscoe (R)	Stewart-Haas Racing	Ford	117	23
15	4	12	Ryan Blaney	Team Penske	Ford	117	27
16	21	47	Ricky Stenhouse Jr.	JTG Daugherty Racing	Chevrolet	117	21
17	22	34	Michael McDowell	Front Row Motorsports	Ford	117	20
18	3	9	Chase Elliott	Hendrick Motorsports	Chevrolet	117	23
19	35	00	Quin Houff	StarCom Racing	Chevrolet	117	18
20	38	16	Justin Haley (i)	Kaulig Racing	Chevrolet	117	0
21	25	6	Ryan Newman	Roush Fenway Racing	Ford	117	16
22	29	7	Corey LaJoie	Spire Motorsports	Chevrolet	117	15
23	18	99	Daniel Suárez	Trackhouse Racing Team	Chevrolet	117	14
24	40	96	Landon Cassill (i)	Gaunt Brothers Racing	Toyota	117	0
25	36	53	Joey Gase (i)	Rick Ware Racing	Ford	117	0
26	20	10	Aric Almirola	Stewart-Haas Racing	Ford	117	11
27	2	18	Kyle Busch	Joe Gibbs Racing	Toyota	117	10
28	31	51	Cody Ware	Petty Ware Racing	Chevrolet	117	0
29	37	15	Garrett Smithley (i)	Rick Ware Racing	Chevrolet	117	0
30	32	78	B. J. McLeod (i)	Live Fast Motorsports	Ford	117	0
31	34	52	Josh Bilicki	Rick Ware Racing	Ford	117	6
32	27	37	Ryan Preece	JTG Daugherty Racing	Chevrolet	116	5
33	23	42	Ross Chastain	Chip Ganassi Racing	Chevrolet	116	7
34	39	66	James Davison	MBM Motorsports	Ford	116	3
35	15	21	Matt DiBenedetto	Wood Brothers Racing	Ford	115	2
36	10	24	William Byron	Hendrick Motorsports	Chevrolet	115	1
37	5	5	Kyle Larson	Hendrick Motorsports	Chevrolet	113	1
38	11	48	Alex Bowman	Hendrick Motorsports	Chevrolet	97	2
39	13	8	Tyler Reddick	Richard Childress Racing	Chevrolet	97	1
40	33	77	Justin Allgaier (i)	Spire Motorsports	Chevrolet	55	0
Official race results

NOTE: The final stage was cancelled. By NASCAR rule, the top ten earned stage points at the point the race was terminated late in the second stage.

=== Race statistics ===
- Lead changes: 35 among 19 different drivers
- Cautions/Laps: 5 for 27
- Red flags: 2 (1 for weather, 1 for 18 minutes and 20 seconds)
- Time of race: 2 hours, 23 minutes and 24 seconds
- Average speed: 130.218 miles per hour (209.566 km/h)

== Media ==
=== Television ===
NBC Sports covered the race on the television side. Rick Allen, Jeff Burton, Steve Letarte and six-time Talladega winner Dale Earnhardt Jr. called the race from the broadcast booth. Dave Burns, Parker Kligerman, Marty Snider and Kelli Stavast handled the pit road duties from pit lane. Rutledge Wood handled the features from the track.

NBCSN
Booth announcers	Pit reporters	Features reporter
Lap-by-lap: Rick Allen; Color-commentator: Jeff Burton; Color-commentator: Steve Letarte; Color-commentator: Dale Earnhardt Jr.	Dave Burns; Parker Kligerman; Marty Snider; Kelli Stavast	Rutledge Wood

=== Radio ===
MRN had the radio call for the race, which was also simulcasted on Sirius XM NASCAR Radio. Alex Hayden, Jeff Striegle and Rusty Wallace called the race for MRN when the field races thru the tri-oval. Dave Moody called the action from turn 1, Mike Bagley called the action for MRN when the field races down the backstraightaway, and Kyle Rickey called the race from the Sunoco tower just outside of turn 4. Steve Post, Kim Coon, and Hannah Newhouse called the action for MRN from pit lane.

MRN
Booth announcers	Turn announcers	Pit reporters
Lead announcer: Alex Hayden; Announcer: Jeff Striegle; Announcer: Rusty Wallace	Turns 1 & 2: Dave Moody; Backstretch: Mike Bagley; Turns 3 & 4: Kyle Rickey	Steve Post; Kim Coon; Hannah Newhouse

== Standings after the race ==
Drivers' Championship standings

	Pos	Driver	Points
1	1	Denny Hamlin	3,116
1	2	Kyle Larson	3,097 (–19)
4	3	Joey Logano	3,096 (–20)
4	4	Brad Keselowski	3,095 (–21)
1	5	Martin Truex Jr.	3,095 (–21)
1	6	Ryan Blaney	3,090 (–26)
1	7	Chase Elliott	3,084 (–32)
1	8	Kyle Busch	3,084 (–32)
1	9	Kevin Harvick	3,075 (–41)
2	10	Christopher Bell	3,056 (–60)
2	11	William Byron	3,040 (–76)
1	12	Alex Bowman	3,032 (–84)
1	13	Kurt Busch	2,146 (–970)
1	14	Tyler Reddick	2,125 (–991)
	15	Aric Almirola	2,104 (–1,012)
	16	Michael McDowell	2,064 (–1,052)
Official driver's standings

Manufacturers' Championship standings

	Pos	Manufacturer	Points
	1	Chevrolet	1,136
1	2	Toyota	1,070 (–66)
1	3	Ford	1,068 (–68)

- Note: Only the first 16 positions are included for the driver standings.

Previous race: 2021 South Point 400	NASCAR Cup Series; 2021 season	Next race: 2021 Bank of America Roval 400
