= American Federation of Motorcyclists =

US motorcycle road racing club

The American Federation of Motorcyclists (AFM) is the oldest motorcycle road racing club in the United States. The AFM was founded in 1954, in part by John McLaughlin, a member of the AMA Motorcycle Hall of Fame. The AFM holds several sanctioned events per year at Buttonwillow Raceway and Thunderhill Raceway Park. Depending on the year, events have also been held at Sonoma Raceway and Laguna Seca.

The AFM features, is a cutting-edge class structure in the motorcycle racing industry. It also offers one of the largest contingency and class sponsorship programs to any racing club in the United States.

Many AFM competitors hold a current AMA Professional racing license and some of the AFM racers actively race abroad.

The AFM, is a professional racing club, with an experienced technical inspection staff, many of whom are certified technical inspectors with the American Motorcyclist Association, World Superbike and MotoGP. Race Director- Barbara Smith- has over 30 years of race director experience and is one of the most experienced motorcycle race directors in the United States. The AFM facilitates a mentor program for newer racers to enhance their transition from being a motorcycle enthusiast, to becoming a motorcycle racing competitor. Also, the AFM maintains a benevolence fund to assist injured racers.

== Athletes ==
National and international racers and champions have raced at AFM events. Current and previous professional athletes include Eric Bostrom, Jason Pridmore, Cameron Beaubier, Cameron Gish, Tucker Lancaster, Melissa Paris (Hayes), Joey Pascarella, Eddie Lawson, Wayne Rainey, Kenny Roberts, Steve Rapp, Sebastio Ferreira, Jake Schmotter, CJ Weaver, Shane Turpin and many more.
