= 2022 Cook Out Southern 500 =

NASCAR Cup Series race

Race details
- Race 27 of 36 in the 2022 NASCAR Cup Series
- The 2022 Cook Out Southern 500 program cover, featuring Chase Elliott, Dale Earnhardt, David Pearson, and Herb Thomas' Hudson Hornet.
- Date: September 4, 2022
- Location: Darlington Raceway in Darlington, South Carolina
- Course: Permanent racing facility
- Course length: 1.366 miles (2.198 km)
- Distance: 367 laps, 501.322 mi (806.666 km)
- Average speed: 120.406 miles per hour (193.775 km/h)

Pole position
Driver	Joey Logano	Team Penske
- Time: 29.181

Most laps led
Driver	Kyle Busch	Joe Gibbs Racing
- Laps: 155

Winner
No. 43	Erik Jones	Petty GMS Motorsports

Television in the United States
- Network: USA
- Announcers: Rick Allen, Jeff Burton, Steve Letarte, Dale Earnhardt Jr., Dale Jarrett and Kyle Petty

Radio in the United States
- Radio: MRN
- Booth announcers: Alex Hayden, Jeff Striegle and Rusty Wallace
- Turn announcers: Dave Moody (1 & 2) and Mike Bagley (3 & 4)

The 2022 Cook Out Southern 500, the 73rd running of the event, was a NASCAR Cup Series race that was held on September 4, 2022, at Darlington Raceway in Darlington, South Carolina. Contested over 367 laps on the 1.366-mile (2.198 km) egg-shaped oval, it was the 27th race of the 2022 NASCAR Cup Series season, the first race of the 2022 NASCAR playoffs, and the first race of the Round of 16.

Erik Jones won, the first race win for Petty GMS Motorsports, in dramatic fashion after inheriting the lead from Kyle Busch, whose Toyota's engine failed on Lap 344 as the field was preparing for the restart.

== Report ==
=== Background ===
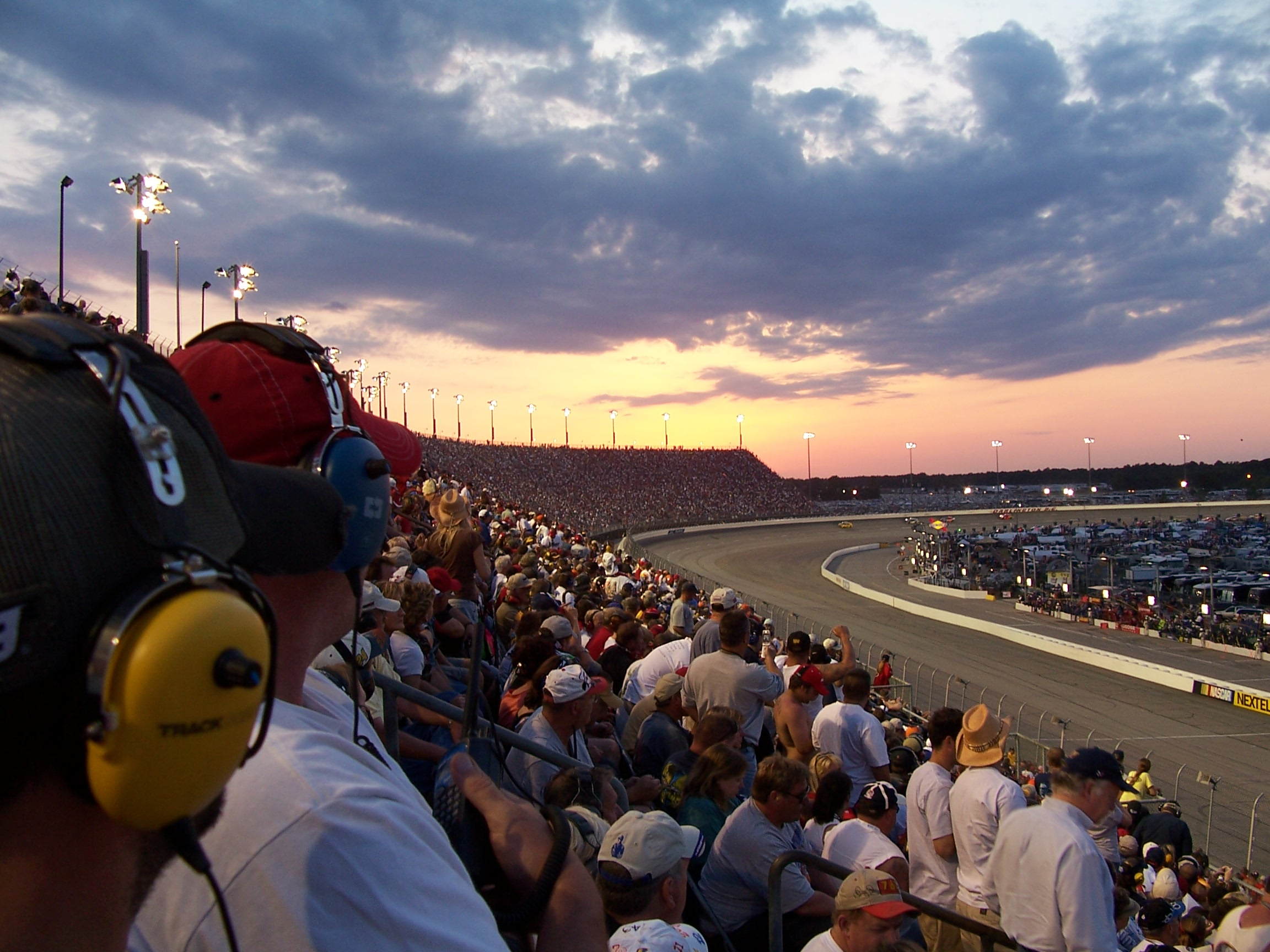
Darlington Raceway where the race was held.

Darlington Raceway is a race track built for NASCAR racing located near Darlington, South Carolina. It is nicknamed "The Lady in Black" and "The Track Too Tough to Tame" by many NASCAR fans and drivers and advertised as "A NASCAR Tradition." It is of a unique, somewhat egg-shaped design, an oval with the ends of very different configurations, a condition which supposedly arose from the proximity of one end of the track to a minnow pond the owner refused to relocate. This situation makes it very challenging for the crews to set up their cars' handling in a way that is effective at both ends.

==== Surface Issues ====
Darlington Raceway was last repaved following the May 2007 meeting (from 2005 to 2019, there was only one meeting; the second meeting was reinstated in 2020), and from 2008 to 2019, there was one night race. In 2020, a day race returned to the schedule, and instead of two races (one Xfinity and one Cup) during the entire year, the track hosted six races (three Cup, two Xfinity, and one Truck). The circuit kept repairing the circuit with patches during each summer before the annual Cup race in September. The circuit's narrow Turn 2 rapidly deteriorated with cracks in the tarmac allowing water to seep in the circuit. In July 2021, the circuit repaved a six hundred foot section at the entrance of Turn 2 and ending at the exit of the turn to repair the tarmac and resolve the issue for safety and to reduce the threat of weepers and surface issues in that section of the circuit.

==== Entry list ====
- (R) denotes rookie driver.
- (i) denotes driver who is ineligible for series driver points.

No.	Driver	Team	Manufacturer
1	Ross Chastain	Trackhouse Racing Team	Chevrolet
2	Austin Cindric (R)	Team Penske	Ford
3	Austin Dillon	Richard Childress Racing	Chevrolet
4	Kevin Harvick	Stewart-Haas Racing	Ford
5	Kyle Larson	Hendrick Motorsports	Chevrolet
6	Brad Keselowski	RFK Racing	Ford
7	Corey LaJoie	Spire Motorsports	Chevrolet
8	Tyler Reddick	Richard Childress Racing	Chevrolet
9	Chase Elliott	Hendrick Motorsports	Chevrolet
10	Aric Almirola	Stewart-Haas Racing	Ford
11	Denny Hamlin	Joe Gibbs Racing	Toyota
12	Ryan Blaney	Team Penske	Ford
14	Chase Briscoe	Stewart-Haas Racing	Ford
15	J. J. Yeley (i)	Rick Ware Racing	Ford
16	Daniel Hemric (i)	Kaulig Racing	Chevrolet
17	Chris Buescher	RFK Racing	Ford
18	Kyle Busch	Joe Gibbs Racing	Toyota
19	Martin Truex Jr.	Joe Gibbs Racing	Toyota
20	Christopher Bell	Joe Gibbs Racing	Toyota
21	Harrison Burton (R)	Wood Brothers Racing	Ford
22	Joey Logano	Team Penske	Ford
23	Ty Gibbs (i) (Note: Kurt Busch's medical suspension from the Pocono Q2 crash (concussion) has not been lifted and has withdrawn from the drivers' championship playoff participation as of August 25, 2022.)	23XI Racing	Toyota
24	William Byron	Hendrick Motorsports	Chevrolet
31	Justin Haley	Kaulig Racing	Chevrolet
34	Michael McDowell	Front Row Motorsports	Ford
38	Todd Gilliland (R)	Front Row Motorsports	Ford
41	Cole Custer	Stewart-Haas Racing	Ford
42	Ty Dillon	Petty GMS Motorsports	Chevrolet
43	Erik Jones	Petty GMS Motorsports	Chevrolet
45	Bubba Wallace (Note: Because the 23XI No. 45 team qualified for the Playoffs with Kurt Busch's win, before his season-ending injury, it was decided on August 31, 2022 that the 23 and 45 teams will swap drivers. Busch's withdrawal does not affect the No. 45 team's standing, so it was decided to swap numbers.)	23XI Racing	Toyota
47	Ricky Stenhouse Jr.	JTG Daugherty Racing	Chevrolet
48	Alex Bowman	Hendrick Motorsports	Chevrolet
51	Cody Ware	Rick Ware Racing	Ford
77	Landon Cassill (i)	Spire Motorsports	Chevrolet
78	B. J. McLeod (i)	Live Fast Motorsports	Ford
99	Daniel Suárez	Trackhouse Racing Team	Chevrolet
Official entry list

== Practice ==
Austin Cindric was the fastest in the practice session with a time of 29.324 seconds and a speed of 167.699 mph (269.885 km/h).

=== Practice results ===
Pos	No.	Driver	Team	Manufacturer	Time	Speed
1	2	Austin Cindric (R)	Team Penske	Ford	29.324	167.699
2	24	William Byron	Hendrick Motorsports	Chevrolet	29.536	166.495
3	43	Erik Jones	Petty GMS Motorsports	Chevrolet	29.538	166.484
Official practice results

== Qualifying ==
For the first time since 2003, the lineal Southern 500 held time trials.

Joey Logano scored the pole for the race with a time of 29.181 and a speed of 168.521 mph (271.208 km/h).

=== Qualifying results ===
Pos	No.	Driver	Team	Manufacturer	R1	R2
1	22	Joey Logano	Team Penske	Ford	29.146	29.181
2	20	Christopher Bell	Joe Gibbs Racing	Toyota	28.976	29.190
3	24	William Byron	Hendrick Motorsports	Chevrolet	28.990	29.239
4	8	Tyler Reddick	Richard Childress Racing	Chevrolet	29.141	29.297
5	18	Kyle Busch	Joe Gibbs Racing	Toyota	29.082	29.323
6	2	Austin Cindric (R)	Team Penske	Ford	29.204	29.336
7	5	Kyle Larson	Hendrick Motorsports	Chevrolet	29.148	29.350
8	45	Bubba Wallace	23XI Racing	Toyota	29.195	29.435
9	12	Ryan Blaney	Team Penske	Ford	29.260	29.447
10	34	Michael McDowell	Front Row Motorsports	Ford	29.132	29.467
11	11	Denny Hamlin	Joe Gibbs Racing	Toyota	29.189	—
12	1	Ross Chastain	Trackhouse Racing Team	Chevrolet	29.227	—
13	3	Austin Dillon	Richard Childress Racing	Chevrolet	29.371	—
14	31	Justin Haley	Kaulig Racing	Chevrolet	29.391	—
15	43	Erik Jones	Petty GMS Motorsports	Chevrolet	29.412	—
16	48	Alex Bowman	Hendrick Motorsports	Chevrolet	29.452	—
17	19	Martin Truex Jr.	Joe Gibbs Racing	Toyota	29.457	—
18	4	Kevin Harvick	Stewart-Haas Racing	Ford	29.476	—
19	14	Chase Briscoe	Stewart-Haas Racing	Ford	29.511	—
20	47	Ricky Stenhouse Jr.	JTG Daugherty Racing	Chevrolet	29.522	—
21	23	Ty Gibbs (i)	23XI Racing	Toyota	29.582	—
22	10	Aric Almirola	Stewart-Haas Racing	Ford	29.603	—
23	9	Chase Elliott	Hendrick Motorsports	Chevrolet	29.646	—
24	16	Daniel Hemric (i)	Kaulig Racing	Chevrolet	29.647	—
25	6	Brad Keselowski	RFK Racing	Ford	29.660	—
26	77	Landon Cassill (i)	Spire Motorsports	Chevrolet	29.676	—
27	17	Chris Buescher	RFK Racing	Ford	29.686	—
28	21	Harrison Burton (R)	Wood Brothers Racing	Ford	29.686	—
29	42	Ty Dillon	Petty GMS Motorsports	Chevrolet	29.753	—
30	41	Cole Custer	Stewart-Haas Racing	Ford	29.801	—
31	38	Todd Gilliland (R)	Front Row Motorsports	Ford	29.834	—
32	51	Cody Ware	Rick Ware Racing	Ford	29.859	—
33	15	J. J. Yeley (i)	Rick Ware Racing	Ford	29.863	—
34	7	Corey LaJoie	Spire Motorsports	Chevrolet	29.893	—
35	78	B. J. McLeod (i)	Live Fast Motorsports	Ford	30.104	—
36	99	Daniel Suárez	Trackhouse Racing Team	Chevrolet	0.000	—
Official qualifying results

== Race ==
=== Stage Results ===
Stage One Laps: 115

Pos	No	Driver	Team	Manufacturer	Points
1	24	William Byron	Hendrick Motorsports	Chevrolet	10
2	11	Denny Hamlin	Joe Gibbs Racing	Toyota	9
3	18	Kyle Busch	Joe Gibbs Racing	Toyota	8
4	20	Christopher Bell	Joe Gibbs Racing	Toyota	7
5	19	Martin Truex Jr.	Joe Gibbs Racing	Toyota	6
6	1	Ross Chastain	Trackhouse Racing Team	Chevrolet	5
7	8	Tyler Reddick	Richard Childress Racing	Chevrolet	4
8	43	Erik Jones	Petty GMS Motorsports	Chevrolet	3
9	12	Ryan Blaney	Team Penske	Ford	2
10	45	Bubba Wallace	23XI Racing	Toyota	1
Official stage one results

Stage Two Laps: 115

Pos	No	Driver	Team	Manufacturer	Points
1	18	Kyle Busch	Joe Gibbs Racing	Toyota	10
2	19	Martin Truex Jr.	Joe Gibbs Racing	Toyota	9
3	12	Ryan Blaney	Team Penske	Ford	8
4	22	Joey Logano	Team Penske	Ford	7
5	24	William Byron	Hendrick Motorsports	Chevrolet	6
6	20	Christopher Bell	Joe Gibbs Racing	Toyota	5
7	48	Alex Bowman	Hendrick Motorsports	Chevrolet	4
8	99	Daniel Suárez	Trackhouse Racing Team	Chevrolet	3
9	43	Erik Jones	Petty GMS Motorsports	Chevrolet	2
10	34	Michael McDowell	Front Row Motorsports	Ford	1
Official stage two results

=== Final Stage Results ===
Stage Three Laps: 137

Pos	Grid	No	Driver	Team	Manufacturer	Laps	Points
1	15	43	Erik Jones	Petty GMS Motorsports	Chevrolet	367	45
2	11	11	Denny Hamlin	Joe Gibbs Racing	Toyota	367	44
3	4	8	Tyler Reddick	Richard Childress Racing	Chevrolet	367	38
4	1	22	Joey Logano	Team Penske	Ford	367	40
5	2	20	Christopher Bell	Joe Gibbs Racing	Toyota	367	44
6	10	34	Michael McDowell	Front Row Motorsports	Ford	367	32
7	25	6	Brad Keselowski	RFK Racing	Ford	367	30
8	3	24	William Byron	Hendrick Motorsports	Chevrolet	367	45
9	8	45	Bubba Wallace	23XI Racing	Toyota	367	29
10	16	48	Alex Bowman	Hendrick Motorsports	Chevrolet	367	31
11	22	10	Aric Almirola	Stewart-Haas Racing	Ford	367	26
12	7	5	Kyle Larson	Hendrick Motorsports	Chevrolet	367	25
13	9	12	Ryan Blaney	Team Penske	Ford	367	34
14	30	41	Cole Custer	Stewart-Haas Racing	Ford	367	23
15	21	23	Ty Gibbs (i)	23XI Racing	Toyota	367	0
16	6	2	Austin Cindric (R)	Team Penske	Ford	367	21
17	13	3	Austin Dillon	Richard Childress Racing	Chevrolet	367	20
18	36	99	Daniel Suárez	Trackhouse Racing Team	Chevrolet	367	22
19	14	31	Justin Haley	Kaulig Racing	Chevrolet	366	18
20	12	1	Ross Chastain	Trackhouse Racing Team	Chevrolet	366	22
21	28	21	Harrison Burton (R)	Wood Brothers Racing	Ford	366	16
22	29	42	Ty Dillon	Petty GMS Motorsports	Chevrolet	366	15
23	24	16	Daniel Hemric (i)	Kaulig Racing	Chevrolet	365	0
24	34	7	Corey LaJoie	Spire Motorsports	Chevrolet	365	13
25	26	77	Landon Cassill (i)	Spire Motorsports	Chevrolet	365	0
26	27	17	Chris Buescher	RFK Racing	Ford	365	11
27	19	14	Chase Briscoe	Stewart-Haas Racing	Ford	363	10
28	31	38	Todd Gilliland (R)	Front Row Motorsports	Ford	363	9
29	35	78	B. J. McLeod (i)	Live Fast Motorsports	Ford	361	0
30	5	18	Kyle Busch	Joe Gibbs Racing	Toyota	345	25
31	17	19	Martin Truex Jr.	Joe Gibbs Racing	Toyota	336	21
32	32	51	Cody Ware	Rick Ware Racing	Ford	331	5
33	18	4	Kevin Harvick	Stewart-Haas Racing	Ford	274	4
34	33	15	J. J. Yeley (i)	Rick Ware Racing	Ford	236	0
35	20	47	Ricky Stenhouse Jr.	JTG Daugherty Racing	Chevrolet	164	2
36	23	9	Chase Elliott	Hendrick Motorsports	Chevrolet	113	1
Official race results

=== Race statistics ===
- Lead changes: 21 among 11 different drivers
- Cautions/Laps: 9 for 58
- Red flags: 0
- Time of race: 4 hours, 9 minutes and 49 seconds
- Average speed: 120.406 miles per hour (193.775 km/h)

== Media ==
=== Television ===
USA covered the race on the television side. Rick Allen, two–time Darlington winner Jeff Burton, Steve Letarte and Dale Earnhardt Jr. called Stages 1 and 3 of the race from the broadcast booth. Earnhardt Jr., Dale Jarrett and Kyle Petty called Stage 2 of the race from the broadcast booth. Dave Burns, Kim Coon, Parker Kligerman and Marty Snider handled the pit road duties from pit lane.

USA
Booth announcers	Pit reporters
Lap-by-lap: Rick Allen; Color-commentator: Jeff Burton; Color-commentator: Steve Letarte; Color-commentator: Dale Earnhardt Jr. Throwback commentator: Dale Jarrett; Throwback commentator: Kyle Petty	Dave Burns; Kim Coon; Parker Kligerman; Marty Snider

=== Radio ===
MRN had the radio call for the race, which was also simulcast on Sirius XM NASCAR Radio.

MRN Radio
Booth announcers	Turn announcers	Pit reporters
Lead announcer: Alex Hayden; Announcer: Jeff Striegle; Announcer: Rusty Wallace	Turns 1 & 2: Dave Moody; Turns 3 & 4: Mike Bagley	Steve Post; Dillon Welch; Chris Wilner; Jason Toy

== Standings after the race ==
Drivers' Championship standings

	Pos	Driver	Points
1	1	Joey Logano	2,065
3	2	William Byron	2,059 (–6)
3	3	Denny Hamlin	2,057 (–8)
6	4	Christopher Bell	2,055 (–10)
3	5	Tyler Reddick	2,050 (–15)
1	6	Ryan Blaney	2,047 (–18)
3	7	Kyle Larson	2,044 (–21)
5	8	Ross Chastain	2,042 (–23)
8	9	Chase Elliott	2,041 (–24)
5	10	Alex Bowman	2,037 (–28)
	11	Kyle Busch	2,035 (–30)
1	12	Daniel Suárez	2,029 (–36)
1	13	Austin Cindric	2,027 (–38)
2	14	Austin Dillon	2,025 (–40)
3	15	Chase Briscoe	2,019 (–46)
7	16	Kevin Harvick	2,016 (–49)
Official driver's standings

Manufacturers' Championship standings

Pos	Manufacturer	Points
1	Chevrolet	999
2	Ford	919 (–80)
3	Toyota	893 (–106)

- Note: Only the first 16 positions are included for the driver standings.

== Notes ==
Previous race: 2022 Coke Zero Sugar 400	NASCAR Cup Series; 2022 season	Next race: 2022 Hollywood Casino 400
