= 2022 Coke Zero Sugar 400 =

NASCAR Cup Series race

Race details
- Race 26 of 36 in the 2022 NASCAR Cup Series
- The 2022 Coke Zero Sugar 400 program cover.
- Date: August 28, 2022
- Location: Daytona International Speedway in Daytona Beach, Florida
- Course: Permanent racing facility
- Course length: 2.5 miles (4 km)
- Distance: 160 laps, 400 mi (640 km)
- Average speed: 138.942 miles per hour (223.605 km/h)

Pole position
Driver	Kyle Larson	Hendrick Motorsports
- Time: 1.350 Score (Pandemic formula)

Most laps led
Driver	Chase Elliott	Hendrick Motorsports
- Laps: 31

Winner
No. 3	Austin Dillon	Richard Childress Racing

Television in the United States
- Network: CNBC
- Announcers: Rick Allen, Jeff Burton, Steve Letarte and Dale Earnhardt Jr.

Radio in the United States
- Radio: MRN
- Booth announcers: Alex Hayden, Jeff Striegle and Rusty Wallace
- Turn announcers: Dave Moody (1 & 2), Mike Bagley (Backstretch) and Kyle Rickey (3 & 4)

The 2022 Coke Zero Sugar 400 was a NASCAR Cup Series race held on August 28, 2022, at Daytona International Speedway in Daytona Beach, Florida. Contested over 160 laps on the 2.5-mile (4.0 km) superspeedway, it was the 26th race of the 2022 NASCAR Cup Series season, and the final race of the regular season before the playoffs. The race was postponed from Saturday, August 27 to Sunday, August 28, due to rain.

== Report ==
=== Background ===
Daytona International Speedway, the site of the race.

The race was held at Daytona International Speedway, a race track located in Daytona Beach, Florida, United States. Since its opening in 1959, the track has been the home of the Daytona 500, the most prestigious race in NASCAR. In addition to NASCAR, the track also hosts ARCA, AMA Superbike, USCC, SCCA, and Motocross races. It features multiple layouts including the primary 2.5 miles (4.0 km) high speed tri-oval, a 3.56 miles (5.73 km) sports car course, a 2.95 miles (4.75 km) motorcycle course, and a .25 miles (0.40 km) karting and motorcycle flat-track. The track's 180-acre (73 ha) infield includes the 29-acre (12 ha) Lake Lloyd, which has hosted powerboat racing. The speedway is owned and operated by International Speedway Corporation.

The track was built in 1959 by NASCAR founder William "Bill" France, Sr. to host racing held at the former Daytona Beach Road Course. His banked design permitted higher speeds and gave fans a better view of the cars. Lights were installed around the track in 1998 and today, it is the third-largest single lit outdoor sports facility. The speedway has been renovated three times, with the infield renovated in 2004 and the track repaved twice — in 1978 and in 2010. On January 22, 2013, the track unveiled artist depictions of a renovated speedway. On July 5 of that year, ground was broken for a project that would remove the backstretch seating and completely redevelop the frontstretch seating. The renovation to the speedway was done by Rossetti Architects. The project, named "Daytona Rising", was completed in January 2016, at a cost of US $400 million, placing emphasis on improving fan experience with five expanded and redesigned fan entrances (called "injectors") as well as wider and more comfortable seating with more restrooms and concession stands. After the renovations, the track's grandstands included 101,000 permanent seats with the ability to increase permanent seating to 125,000. The project was completed before the start of Speedweeks.

==== Entry list ====
- (R) denotes rookie driver.
- (i) denotes driver who is ineligible for series driver points.

No.	Driver	Team	Manufacturer
1	Ross Chastain	Trackhouse Racing Team	Chevrolet
2	Austin Cindric (R)	Team Penske	Ford
3	Austin Dillon	Richard Childress Racing	Chevrolet
4	Kevin Harvick	Stewart-Haas Racing	Ford
5	Kyle Larson	Hendrick Motorsports	Chevrolet
6	Brad Keselowski	RFK Racing	Ford
7	Corey LaJoie	Spire Motorsports	Chevrolet
8	Tyler Reddick	Richard Childress Racing	Chevrolet
9	Chase Elliott	Hendrick Motorsports	Chevrolet
10	Aric Almirola	Stewart-Haas Racing	Ford
11	Denny Hamlin	Joe Gibbs Racing	Toyota
12	Ryan Blaney	Team Penske	Ford
14	Chase Briscoe	Stewart-Haas Racing	Ford
15	David Ragan	Rick Ware Racing	Ford
16	Daniel Hemric (i)	Kaulig Racing	Chevrolet
17	Chris Buescher	RFK Racing	Ford
18	Kyle Busch	Joe Gibbs Racing	Toyota
19	Martin Truex Jr.	Joe Gibbs Racing	Toyota
20	Christopher Bell	Joe Gibbs Racing	Toyota
21	Harrison Burton (R)	Wood Brothers Racing	Ford
22	Joey Logano	Team Penske	Ford
23	Bubba Wallace	23XI Racing	Toyota
24	William Byron	Hendrick Motorsports	Chevrolet
31	Justin Haley	Kaulig Racing	Chevrolet
34	Michael McDowell	Front Row Motorsports	Ford
38	Todd Gilliland (R)	Front Row Motorsports	Ford
41	Cole Custer	Stewart-Haas Racing	Ford
42	Ty Dillon	Petty GMS Motorsports	Chevrolet
43	Erik Jones	Petty GMS Motorsports	Chevrolet
45	Ty Gibbs (i) (Note: Kurt Busch's medical suspension from the Pocono Q2 crash (concussion) has not been lifted and has withdrawn from the drivers' championship playoff participation as of August 25, 2022.)	23XI Racing	Toyota
47	Ricky Stenhouse Jr.	JTG Daugherty Racing	Chevrolet
48	Alex Bowman	Hendrick Motorsports	Chevrolet
51	Cody Ware	Rick Ware Racing	Ford
62	Noah Gragson (i)	Beard Motorsports	Chevrolet
77	Landon Cassill (i)	Spire Motorsports	Chevrolet
78	B. J. McLeod (i)	Live Fast Motorsports	Ford
99	Daniel Suárez	Trackhouse Racing Team	Chevrolet
Official entry list

== Qualifying ==
Qualifying was cancelled because of inclement weather. Kyle Larson was awarded the pole for the race as a result of the pandemic formula with a score of 1.350.

=== Starting Lineup ===
Pos	No.	Driver	Team	Manufacturer	Score
1	5	Kyle Larson	Hendrick Motorsports	Chevrolet	1.350
2	9	Chase Elliott	Hendrick Motorsports	Chevrolet	2.650
3	22	Joey Logano	Team Penske	Ford	3.800
4	99	Daniel Suárez	Trackhouse Racing Team	Chevrolet	7.300
5	20	Christopher Bell	Joe Gibbs Racing	Toyota	7.500
6	8	Tyler Reddick	Richard Childress Racing	Chevrolet	8.800
7	4	Kevin Harvick	Stewart-Haas Racing	Ford	11.050
8	17	Chris Buescher	RFK Racing	Ford	12.700
9	34	Michael McDowell	Front Row Motorsports	Ford	13.050
10	48	Alex Bowman	Hendrick Motorsports	Chevrolet	14.000
11	43	Erik Jones	Petty GMS Motorsports	Chevrolet	14.250
12	1	Ross Chastain	Trackhouse Racing Team	Chevrolet	14.800
13	19	Martin Truex Jr.	Joe Gibbs Racing	Toyota	15.700
14	2	Austin Cindric (R)	Team Penske	Ford	15.800
15	41	Cole Custer	Stewart-Haas Racing	Ford	16.400
16	12	Ryan Blaney	Team Penske	Ford	17.400
17	24	William Byron	Hendrick Motorsports	Chevrolet	19.000 (a)
18	31	Justin Haley	Kaulig Racing	Chevrolet	19.000 (a)
19	11	Denny Hamlin	Joe Gibbs Racing	Toyota	19.100
20	47	Ricky Stenhouse Jr.	JTG Daugherty Racing	Chevrolet	19.700
21	3	Austin Dillon	Richard Childress Racing	Chevrolet	19.750
22	18	Kyle Busch	Joe Gibbs Racing	Toyota	20.500
23	45	Ty Gibbs (i)	23XI Racing	Toyota	21.700
24	6	Brad Keselowski	RFK Racing	Ford	21.800
25	42	Ty Dillon	Petty GMS Motorsports	Chevrolet	22.100
26	14	Chase Briscoe	Stewart-Haas Racing	Ford	23.500
27	10	Aric Almirola	Stewart-Haas Racing	Ford	26.850
28	16	Daniel Hemric (i)	Kaulig Racing	Chevrolet	27.050
29	21	Harrison Burton (R)	Wood Brothers Racing	Ford	28.450
30	23	Bubba Wallace	23XI Racing	Toyota	30.000
31	7	Corey LaJoie	Spire Motorsports	Chevrolet	30.250
32	38	Todd Gilliland (R)	Front Row Motorsports	Ford	32.850
33	51	Cody Ware	Rick Ware Racing	Ford	34.500
34	15	David Ragan	Rick Ware Racing	Ford	35.700
35	77	Landon Cassill (i)	Spire Motorsports	Chevrolet	35.800
36	78	B. J. McLeod (i)	Live Fast Motorsports	Ford	38.750
37	62	Noah Gragson (i)	Beard Motorsports	Chevrolet	40.65
Official starting lineup Qualifying Metric Scores

a: Byron and Haley were tied in qualifying metric score, which determines qualifying order in reverse, and is used in case qualifying cannot be conducted. More owner points is the tiebreaker.

== Race ==
=== Stages 1 & 2 ===
Outside pole sitter Chase Elliott took the lead from pole sitter Kyle Larson and led the first lap. On lap 15, Larson's engine blew but did not leak fluid and the race kept going. On lap 21, Erik Jones challenged Elliott for the lead. Jones led laps 22 and 23 while Elliott led laps 24 to 26. On lap 27, Jones would pass Elliott for the lead. On lap 31, Elliott attempted to take the lead from Jones when Jones' pusher, Denny Hamlin, hit Jones at the wrong angle and turned Jones sideways that ended up causing a stack up wreck collecting 6 cars including Jones, Hamlin, Kevin Harvick, Brad Keselowski, Christopher Bell, and Ryan Blaney, who was in the midst of a battle for the last spot in the NASCAR playoffs with Martin Truex Jr. and multiple other drivers that were in must-win situations, bringing out the first caution of the race. Chase Elliott led the field to the restart on lap 35 which would be the last lap of stage 1. But Joey Logano took the lead from Elliott and Logano would win stage 1. Ross Chastain won the race off of pit road but multiple drivers did not pit including Corey LaJoie and LaJoie led the field to the restart on lap 41 to begin stage 2. Bubba Wallace took the lead from LaJoie on the restart. Erik Jones took the lead from Wallace on lap 43. On lap 44, Corey LaJoie took the lead from Jones. Jones would retake the lead from LaJoie on lap 46. On lap 51, Chris Buescher attempted to take the lead from Jones and led that lap and passed Jones but Jones would take it back the next lap. On lap 59, William Byron attempted to take the lead from Jones and led that lap but could not pass Jones and Jones would take the lead. On lap 63, Alex Bowman took the lead. On that same lap, disaster almost struck on Chris Buescher as he almost spun out off of turn 4 but saved it. On lap 64, Denny Hamlin took the lead from Bowman. On lap 77, green flag pit stops began. Hamlin pitted and gave the lead to Joey Logano. On lap 79, Logano and many others pitted handing the lead to B. J. McLeod. After everything cycled through, Chase Elliott was the new leader. On lap 82, Tyler Reddick took the lead from Elliott. On lap 86, Elliott took the lead back from Reddick. On lap 88, Reddick took the lead but was immediately passed by Kyle Busch. On lap 90, Reddick took the lead from Busch. On lap 92 and with 4 laps left in stage 2, Kyle Busch retook the lead and Busch would win stage 2.

=== Final stage ===
Michael McDowell won the race off of pit road and he led the field to the restart on lap 101. On the restart, Joey Logano would take the lead from McDowell. On the next lap, the first big one would occur down the backstretch taking out 8 cars. It started when Tyler Reddick hit Michael McDowell at the wrong angle and McDowell went up and hit the outside wall and came down in front of the pack collecting Ross Chastain, Corey LaJoie, Chris Buescher, Martin Truex Jr., Bubba Wallace, and William Byron. The wreck would be big for Truex as he and Ryan Blaney were both battling each other and whoever is in a must-win situation to lock themselves into the playoffs. The race would restart on lap 108. Tyler Reddick took the lead from Logano on the restart. Logano would take the lead back on the next lap. Reddick would take the lead back on the next lap. With 46 laps to go, Alex Bowman would take the lead from Reddick. With 36 to go, Joey Logano took the lead from Bowman. On that same lap, the 5th caution of the race would occur for a multi car crash off of turn 4. Chase Briscoe attempted to take the lead from Logano but got turned by Alex Bowman and Briscoe hit the outside wall head on and collected Bowman, Austin Dillon, Aric Almirola, Bubba Wallace, and Cole Custer. Soon, weather was starting to become a threat and teams and drivers started to strategize in an attempt to win since the race was way past the halfway point. Justin Haley and Erik Jones stayed out and Haley led the field to the restart with 30 laps to go. But on the restart, the 6th caution would fly when Aric Almirola turned Erik Jones and Jones spun down and collected Joey Logano on the backstretch. Haley led the field to the restart with 26 to go. With 25 to go, Daniel Suárez took the lead from Haley. With 24 to go, Denny Hamlin attempted to take the lead from Suárez. But around that time, rain began to fall in turns 1 and 2. NASCAR did not realize it until it was too late. With 23 to go, another big one struck in turn 1 and causing the 7th and final caution of the race. In turn 1, Denny Hamlin, Daniel Suárez, Daniel Hemric, and Justin Haley all got sideways at the exact same time and all spun and the wreck collected a total of 18 cars including a majority of the top 20. Cars slid and spun everywhere due to the lack of grip on the pavement of the track. Some crashes were pretty scary. Ricky Stenhouse Jr's car ramped on top of the left rear of Aric Almirola's car. Daniel Suárez took a big shot into the outside wall where he got t-boned in the passengers side by Denny Hamlin. The first car to come out of the wreck unscathed would be Austin Dillon who was back in around the 17th position. The wreck collected Kevin Harvick, Tyler Reddick, Chase Elliott, Aric Almirola, Denny Hamlin, Daniel Hemric, Chris Buescher, Kyle Busch, Harrison Burton, Bubba Wallace, Justin Haley, Todd Gilliland, Ty Dillon, Erik Jones, Ricky Stenhouse Jr., Cody Ware, Noah Gragson, and Daniel Suárez. The red flag was soon issued for the weather. The red flag lasted for nearly 3 hours and 20 minutes before the race could restart. There were only 17 cars left on track when the race restarted with 16 laps to go. Austin Dillon led the field to green. Dillon and many others behind him including Cody Ware were in a must-win situation if they wanted to lock themselves a spot in the playoffs. But on the restart, Austin Cindric, who won the 2022 Daytona 500 earlier in the year, took the lead with a push from Martin Truex Jr. Soon, Cindric led Dillon, Landon Cassill, and Martin Truex Jr. on a four car breakaway from the pack. Eventually, Tyler Reddick and Noah Gragson would join them. But Cassill and Truex both lost the draft and were trying to catch back up. With 6 to go, Cole Custer blew a right front tire and hit the outside wall but no caution was flown. Truex went all the way back to 10th in the second pack. His only hope was that Austin Cindric would hold off Austin Dillon in order to lock Truex into the playoffs. But with 3 to go, Dillon hit the rear bumper of Cindric hard enough that got Cindric loose and lose momentum and Dillon took the lead with his teammate Tyler Reddick behind him. Dillon would hold off the pack and Dillon would pick up his first win of 2022 and the win would lock him into the NASCAR playoffs. Despite an 8th-place finish, Martin Truex Jr. would miss the playoffs by 3 points to Ryan Blaney, who finished 15th 6 laps down. Tyler Reddick, Austin Cindric, Landon Cassill, and Noah Gragson rounded out the top 5 while Cody Ware, B. J. McLeod, Martin Truex Jr., David Ragan, and Kyle Busch rounded out the top 10.

== Race results ==
=== Stage Results ===
Stage One Laps: 35

Pos	No	Driver	Team	Manufacturer	Points
1	22	Joey Logano	Team Penske	Ford	10
2	9	Chase Elliott	Hendrick Motorsports	Chevrolet	9
3	21	Harrison Burton (R)	Wood Brothers Racing	Ford	8
4	18	Kyle Busch	Joe Gibbs Racing	Toyota	7
5	19	Martin Truex Jr.	Joe Gibbs Racing	Toyota	6
6	7	Corey LaJoie	Spire Motorsports	Chevrolet	5
7	23	Bubba Wallace	23XI Racing	Toyota	4
8	47	Ricky Stenhouse Jr.	JTG Daugherty Racing	Chevrolet	3
9	43	Erik Jones	Petty GMS Motorsports	Chevrolet	2
10	34	Michael McDowell	Front Row Motorsports	Ford	1
Official stage one results

Stage Two Laps: 60

Pos	No	Driver	Team	Manufacturer	Points
1	18	Kyle Busch	Joe Gibbs Racing	Toyota	10
2	19	Martin Truex Jr.	Joe Gibbs Racing	Toyota	9
3	11	Denny Hamlin	Joe Gibbs Racing	Toyota	8
4	22	Joey Logano	Team Penske	Ford	7
5	23	Bubba Wallace	23XI Racing	Toyota	6
6	38	Todd Gilliland (R)	Front Row Motorsports	Ford	5
7	8	Tyler Reddick	Richard Childress Racing	Chevrolet	4
8	4	Kevin Harvick	Stewart-Haas Racing	Ford	3
9	47	Ricky Stenhouse Jr.	JTG Daugherty Racing	Chevrolet	2
10	3	Austin Dillon	Richard Childress Racing	Chevrolet	1
Official stage two results

=== Final Stage Results ===
Stage Three Laps: 65

Pos	Grid	No	Driver	Team	Manufacturer	Laps	Points
1	21	3	Austin Dillon	Richard Childress Racing	Chevrolet	160	41
2	6	8	Tyler Reddick	Richard Childress Racing	Chevrolet	160	39
3	14	2	Austin Cindric (R)	Team Penske	Ford	160	34
4	35	77	Landon Cassill (i)	Spire Motorsports	Chevrolet	160	0
5	37	62	Noah Gragson (i)	Beard Motorsports	Chevrolet	160	0
6	33	51	Cody Ware	Rick Ware Racing	Ford	160	31
7	36	78	B. J. McLeod (i)	Live Fast Motorsports	Ford	160	0
8	13	19	Martin Truex Jr.	Joe Gibbs Racing	Toyota	160	44
9	34	15	David Ragan	Rick Ware Racing	Ford	160	28
10	22	18	Kyle Busch	Joe Gibbs Racing	Toyota	160	43
11	30	23	Bubba Wallace	23XI Racing	Toyota	159	36
12	3	22	Joey Logano	Team Penske	Ford	158	42
13	23	45	Ty Gibbs (i)	23XI Racing	Toyota	158	0
14	10	48	Alex Bowman	Hendrick Motorsports	Chevrolet	156	23
15	16	12	Ryan Blaney	Team Penske	Ford	154	22
16	15	41	Cole Custer	Stewart-Haas Racing	Ford	153	21
17	11	43	Erik Jones	Petty GMS Motorsports	Chevrolet	148	22
18	25	42	Ty Dillon	Petty GMS Motorsports	Chevrolet	144	19
19	29	21	Harrison Burton (R)	Wood Brothers Racing	Ford	140	26
20	7	4	Kevin Harvick	Stewart-Haas Racing	Ford	139	20
21	27	10	Aric Almirola	Stewart-Haas Racing	Ford	138	16
22	20	47	Ricky Stenhouse Jr.	JTG Daugherty Racing	Chevrolet	138	20
23	32	38	Todd Gilliland (R)	Front Row Motorsports	Ford	138	19
24	4	99	Daniel Suárez	Trackhouse Racing Team	Chevrolet	137	13
25	19	11	Denny Hamlin	Joe Gibbs Racing	Toyota	137	20
26	28	16	Daniel Hemric (i)	Kaulig Racing	Chevrolet	137	0
27	8	17	Chris Buescher	RFK Racing	Ford	137	10
28	18	31	Justin Haley	Kaulig Racing	Chevrolet	137	9
29	2	9	Chase Elliott	Hendrick Motorsports	Chevrolet	137	17
30	31	7	Corey LaJoie	Spire Motorsports	Chevrolet	137	12
31	26	14	Chase Briscoe	Stewart-Haas Racing	Ford	124	6
32	9	34	Michael McDowell	Front Row Motorsports	Ford	101	6
33	12	1	Ross Chastain	Trackhouse Racing Team	Chevrolet	101	4
34	17	24	William Byron	Hendrick Motorsports	Chevrolet	101	3
35	24	6	Brad Keselowski	RFK Racing	Ford	31	2
36	5	20	Christopher Bell	Joe Gibbs Racing	Toyota	30	1
37	1	5	Kyle Larson	Hendrick Motorsports	Chevrolet	14	1
Official race results

=== Race statistics ===
- Lead changes: 39 among 19 different drivers
- Cautions/Laps: 7 for 30 laps
- Red flags: 1 for 3 hours, 19 minutes, and 57 seconds
- Time of race: 2 hours, 52 minutes and 44 seconds
- Average speed: 138.942 miles per hour (223.605 km/h)

== Media ==
=== Television ===
NBC Sports covered the race on the television side. Rick Allen, 2000 Coke Zero 400 winner Jeff Burton, Steve Letarte and two-time Coke Zero 400 winner Dale Earnhardt Jr. called the race from the broadcast booth. Dave Burns, Parker Kligerman and Marty Snider handled the pit road duties from pit lane. Rutledge Wood served as a "CityView" reporter and share stories from the track.

CNBC
Booth announcers	Pit reporters	Cityview reporter
Lap-by-lap: Rick Allen; Color-commentator: Jeff Burton; Color-commentator: Steve Letarte; Color-commentator: Dale Earnhardt Jr.	Dave Burns; Parker Kligerman; Marty Snider	Rutledge Wood

=== Radio ===
MRN had the radio call for the race, which was also simulcast on Sirius XM NASCAR Radio.

MRN Radio
Booth announcers	Turn announcers	Pit reporters
Lead announcer: Alex Hayden; Announcer: Jeff Striegle; Announcer: Rusty Wallace	Turns 1 & 2: Dave Moody; Backstretch: Mike Bagley; Turns 3 & 4: Kyle Rickey	Steve Post; Jason Toy; Georgia Henneberry

== Standings after the race ==
Drivers' Championship standings after Playoffs reset

	Pos	Driver	Points
	1	Chase Elliott	2,040
2	2	Joey Logano	2,025 (–15)
2	3	Ross Chastain	2,020 (–20)
2	4	Kyle Larson	2,019 (–21)
5	5	William Byron	2,014 (–26)
8	6	Denny Hamlin	2,013 (–27)
4	7	Ryan Blaney	2,013 (–27)
5	8	Tyler Reddick	2,012 (–28)
1	9	Kevin Harvick	2,012 (–28)
3	10	Christopher Bell	2,011 (–29)
2	11	Kyle Busch	2,010 (–30)
4	12	Chase Briscoe	2,009 (–31)
1	13	Daniel Suárez	2,007 (–33)
1	14	Austin Cindric	2,006 (–34)
4	15	Alex Bowman	2,006 (–34)
3	16	Austin Dillon	2,005 (–35)
Official driver's standings

Owners Championship standings after Playoffs reset

NOTE: Following Kurt Busch's withdrawal announced August 25, the drivers and owners championships are different in 2022. It was further announced on August 31, 2022 that the 23 and 45 teams will swap drivers.

Pos	Team	Number	Current Driver	Points
1	Hendrick Motorsports	9	Chase Elliott	2,040
2	Team Penske	22	Joey Logano	2,025 (–15)
3	Trackhouse Racing	1	Ross Chastain	2,020 (–20)
4	Hendrick Motorsports	5	Kyle Larson	2,019 (–21)
5	Hendrick Motorsports	24	William Byron	2,014 (–26)
6	Joe Gibbs Racing	11	Denny Hamlin	2,013 (–27)
7	Richard Childress Racing	8	Tyler Reddick	2,012 (–28)
8	Stewart-Haas Racing	4	Kevin Harvick	2,012 (–28)
9	Joe Gibbs Racing	20	Christopher Bell	2,011 (–29)
10	Joe Gibbs Racing	18	Kyle Busch	2,010 (–30)
11	Stewart-Haas Racing	14	Chase Briscoe	2,009 (–31)
12	23XI Racing	45	Bubba Wallace (Note: On August 31, 2022, it was announced by 23XI Racing that the 23 and 45 teams will swap numbers since the 45 team is in the playoff, to keep its full-time driver in the playoff car.)	2,007 (–33)
13	Trackhouse Racing	99	Daniel Suárez	2,007 (–33)
14	Team Penske	2	Austin Cindric	2,006 (–34)
15	Hendrick Motorsports	48	Alex Bowman	2,006 (–34)
16	Richard Childress Racing	3	Austin Dillon	2,005 (–35)
Official Owners Standings

Manufacturers' Championship standings

Pos	Manufacturer	Points
1	Chevrolet	959
2	Ford	886 (–73)
3	Toyota	858 (–101)

- Note: Only the first 16 positions are included for the driver standings.

== Notes ==
Previous race: 2022 Go Bowling at The Glen	NASCAR Cup Series; 2022 season	Next race: 2022 Cook Out Southern 500
