= Erik Jones =

American racing driver (born 1996)

- Jones at Las Vegas Motor Speedway in 2026
- Born: Erik Benjamin Jones; May 30, 1996 (age 30); Byron, Michigan, U.S.
- Achievements: First driver ever to win Rookie of the Year in all three NASCAR national series 2019, 2022 Southern 500 Winner; 2015 NASCAR Camping World Truck Series Champion; 2011 CRA JEGS All-Star Tour Champion; 2011 Florida Governor's Cup Winner; 2012, 2013 Snowball Derby Winner; 2013, 2014, 2015 Winchester 400 Winner; 2014 Howie Lettow Memorial Winner; 2015 Redbud 400 Winner; 2020 Busch Clash Winner; 2023 Money in the Bank 150 Winner
- Awards: 2015 NASCAR Camping World Truck Series Rookie of the Year; 2016 NASCAR Xfinity Series Rookie of the Year; 2017 Monster Energy NASCAR Cup Series Rookie of the Year

NASCAR Cup Series career
- 361 races run over 11 years
- Car no., team: No. 43 (Legacy Motor Club)
- 2026 position: 23rd
- Best finish: 15th (2018)
- First race: 2015 SpongeBob SquarePants 400 (Kansas)
- Last race: 2026 Season Finale 400 (Homestead)
- First win: 2018 Coke Zero Sugar 400 (Daytona)
- Last win: 2022 Cook Out Southern 500 (Darlington)
Wins	Top tens	Poles
3	100	2

NASCAR O'Reilly Auto Parts Series career
- 79 races run over 6 years
- 2021 position: 105th
- Best finish: 4th (2016)
- First race: 2014 EnjoyIllinois.com 300 (Chicagoland)
- Last race: 2021 Skrewball Peanut Butter Whiskey 200 at The Glen (Watkins Glen)
- First win: 2015 O'Reilly Auto Parts 300 (Texas)
- Last win: 2017 O'Reilly Auto Parts 300 (Texas)
Wins	Top tens	Poles
9	50	15

NASCAR FedEx Freight Truck Series career
- 42 races run over 5 years
- 2018 position: 93rd
- Best finish: 1st (2015)
- First race: 2013 Kroger 250 (Martinsville)
- Last race: 2018 Gander Outdoors 150 (Pocono)
- First win: 2013 Lucas Oil 150 (Phoenix)
- Last win: 2015 WinStar World Casino & Resort 350 (Texas)
Wins	Top tens	Poles
7	35	7

ARCA Menards Series career
- 14 races run over 2 years
- Best finish: 21st (2012)
- First race: 2012 Mobile ARCA 200 (Mobile)
- Last race: 2013 ZLOOP 150 (Kentucky)
- First win: 2013 Primera Plastics 200 (Berlin)
Wins	Top tens	Poles
1	8	0

ARCA Menards Series East career
- 1 race run over 1 year
- Best finish: 57th (2018)
- First race: 2018 Great Outdoors RV Superstore 100 (Watkins Glen)
Wins	Top tens	Poles
0	0	0

ARCA Menards Series West career
- 1 race run over 1 year
- Best finish: 37th (2018)
- First race: 2018 Carneros 200 (Sonoma)
Wins	Top tens	Poles
0	1	0
- Statistics up to date as of November 8, 2026.

Erik Benjamin Jones (born May 30, 1996) is an American professional stock car racing driver. He competes full-time in the NASCAR Cup Series, driving the No. 43 Toyota Camry XSE for Legacy Motor Club.

Jones' nicknames are EJ, his initials, and That Jones Boy, given to him by announcer Ken Squier. Until 2021, Jones had spent his entire NASCAR and ARCA career with Toyota, and while in their driver development program, he won the 2015 NASCAR Camping World Truck Series championship. He would return to Toyota's NASCAR program in 2024 when Legacy Motor Club would switch their manufactural allegiance to them.

== Racing career ==
=== Early career and short track racing ===
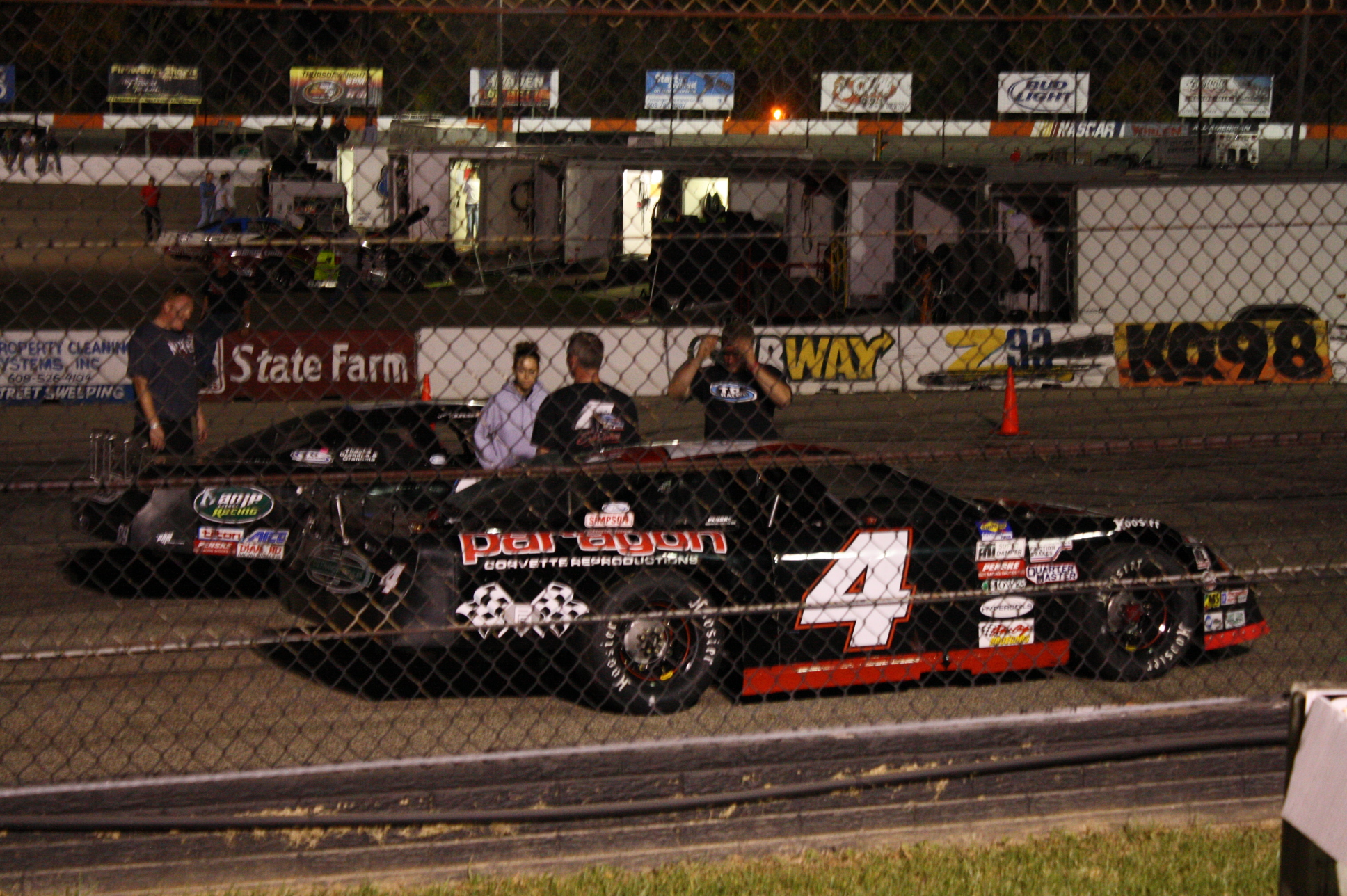
Jones' 2010 ASA North Late Model that he won with at the La Crosse

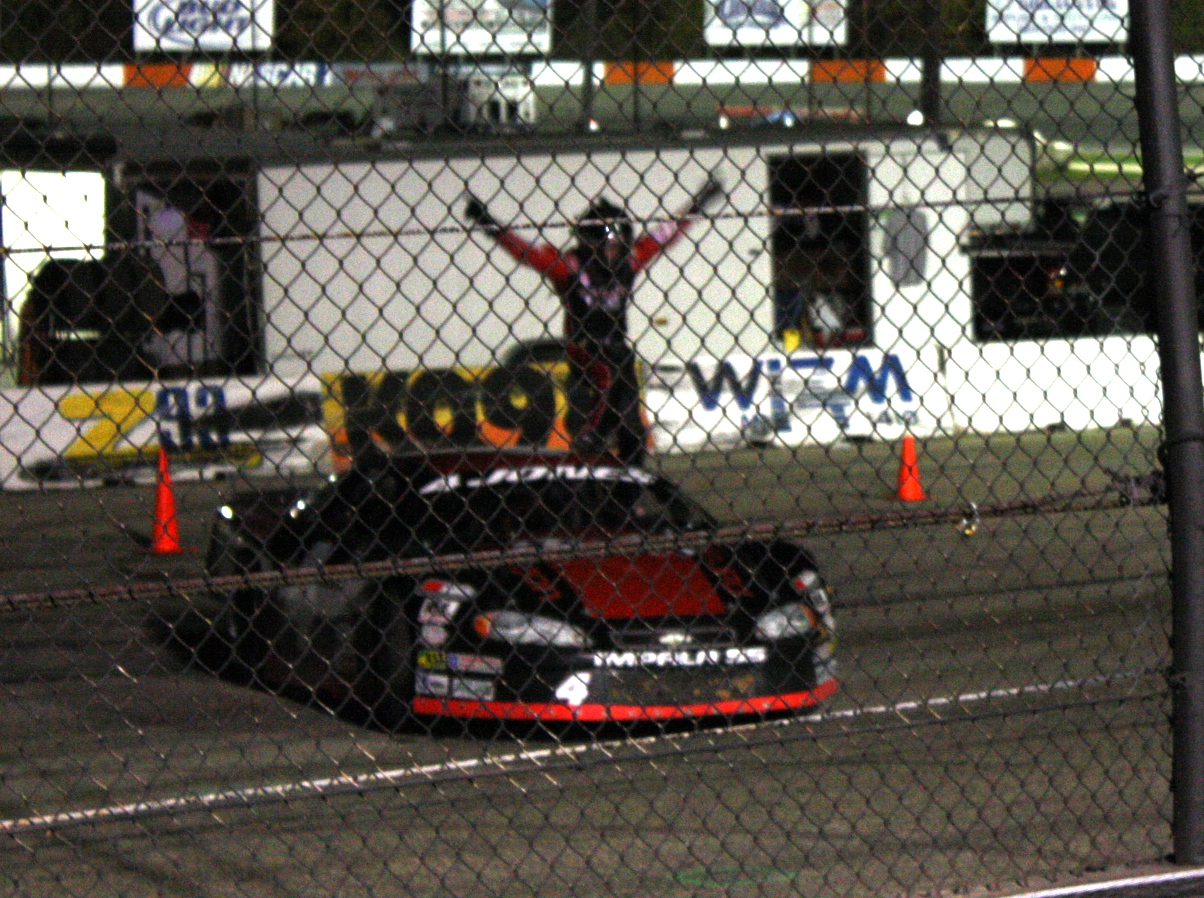
Jones celebrating 2010 win

Jones began his racing career at the age of seven, in quarter-midget racing; he began racing stock cars at age 13, and began competing in the ASA Late Model Series in 2010, becoming the youngest-ever winner of the Oktoberfest race at LaCrosse Fairgrounds Speedway. Moving to the Champion Racing Association's CRA All-Star Tour in 2011, he won the series championship in his rookie year; Jones also was the winner of that year's Governor's Cup 200 late model race at New Smyrna Speedway, leading every lap of the event; he was the first driver not born in the state of Florida to achieve that feat in over thirty years.

In December 2012, Jones held off NASCAR Sprint Cup Series driver Kyle Busch to win the prestigious Snowball Derby.

In December 2013, Jones was named the winner of the 2013 Snowball Derby after the original winner, Chase Elliott, was disqualified after post-race inspections revealed a piece of tungsten in his car.

=== ARCA Racing Series ===
==== 2012 ====
Jones moved to the ARCA Racing Series for the 2012 season, becoming the first-ever driver to compete in the series at the age of fifteen; competing in ten of the series' nineteen races (he was not eligible at tracks longer than one mile), he posted a best finish of third at Winchester Speedway and Berlin Raceway.

==== 2013 ====
In 2013, Jones picked up his first ARCA Racing Series win at Berlin Raceway after dominating the whole race.

=== Gander RV & Outdoors Truck Series ===
==== 2013 ====
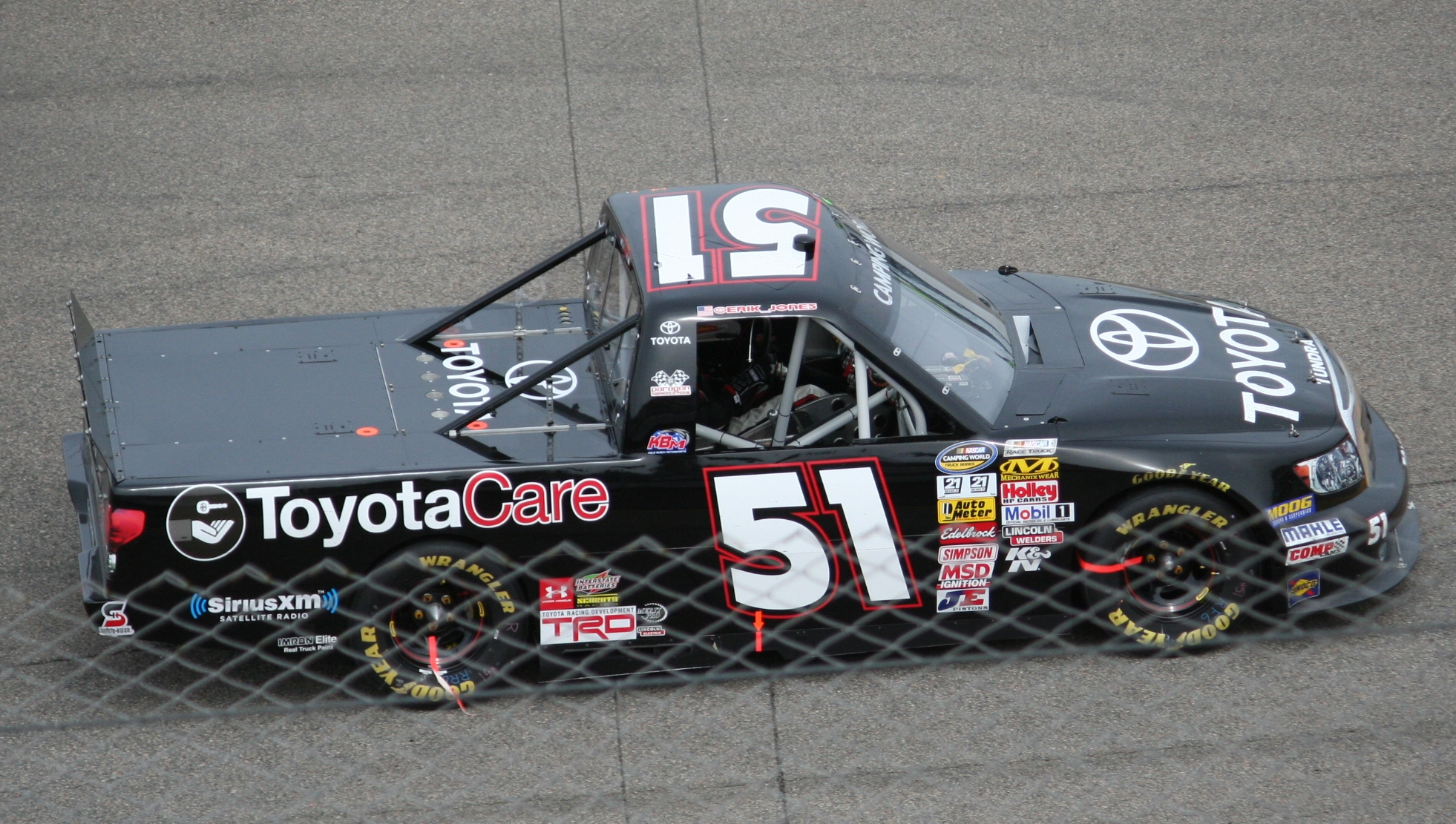
Jones' 2013 truck at Rockingham Speedway

In March 2013, Kyle Busch Motorsports announced that it had signed Jones to drive in five age-eligible Camping World Truck Series races in the team's No. 51 Toyota Tundra, driving at Martinsville Speedway, Rockingham Speedway, and Iowa Speedway, as NASCAR relaxed the "Kyle Busch Rule" in that series where the minimum age was reduced from eighteen to sixteen at ovals shorter than 2,000 meters and road courses. Jones finished second in his third career start in the series at Iowa. In October, Jones added another prestigious late model trophy to his collection, winning the Winchester 400.

On November 8, 2013, Jones became the youngest driver ever to win in the history of NASCAR's top-level competition to that time, winning the Lucas Oil 150 at Phoenix International Raceway over Ross Chastain at the age of seventeen years, five months, and eight days. (Note: The current youngest NASCAR national touring series winner is Cole Custer, winning at New Hampshire Motor Speedway in September 2014 at 16 years, 7 months, and 28 days.)

==== 2014 ====
In January 2014, it was announced that Jones would return to KBM in the Truck Series for 2014, competing in all age-eligible events and selected longer track events after he turned eighteen. On July 11, 2014, at Iowa Speedway, Jones dueled Ryan Blaney and ultimately held him off for the win. On September 13, 2014, at Chicagoland Speedway, Jones qualified for Kyle Busch, who would later go on and win the race. On September 27, 2014, Jones won at Las Vegas Motor Speedway for his first longer track win. On November 7, 2014, Jones picked up his fourth career Truck Series win under the red flag at Phoenix, due to a power outage.

==== 2015 ====
On November 6, 2014, it was announced that Jones would run the full 2015 season in the Trucks for KBM, his first age-eligible season racing for a championship, as well as running an increased slate of races for Joe Gibbs Racing in the Xfinity Series.

In 2015, Jones started his season strong with a 2nd place finish at Daytona International Speedway. At Kansas Speedway, Jones would pick up his first pole of the season. In June, Jones would qualify well, winning pole position at Texas Motor Speedway, Gateway Motorsports Park, and Iowa Speedway. In the same race at Iowa, Jones would score his first win of the 2015 season.

In August, Jones would win the pole for the Pocono Mountains 150 at Pocono Raceway. In the same month, Jones would score his second win of the season at Canadian Tire Motorsports Park, gaining the points lead for the first time in his career after Tyler Reddick, the points leader entering the race, got into a wreck. After a string of top-ten finishes, Jones picked up win number three on the season at Texas Motor Speedway, extending his point lead over Crafton. Jones battled with defending champion Matt Crafton and Reddick during the 2015 season and beat them to win the Championship.

==== 2016 ====
In 2016, Jones would return to KBM to run a single race at Gateway Motorsports Park. Jones would end up finishing fifth after starting the race in sixth.

==== 2018 ====
Jones would again return to KBM for a single race in 2018, this time racing at Pocono Raceway. He would finish in second place behind his teammate and truck owner, Kyle Busch.

==== 2020 ====
In 2020, Jones joined a partnership between Wauters Motorsports and former team owners James Finch and Billy Ballew to run the Truck race at Homestead–Miami Speedway. The effort was spurred by a bounty from Kevin Harvick and Marcus Lemonis for full-time Cup drivers who could beat Busch in a Truck race. The COVID-19 pandemic resulted in the plan shifting to Charlotte Motor Speedway, but Jones was excluded from the forty-truck field as the No. 5 had no points in the owner's standings.

=== Xfinity Series ===
==== 2014 ====
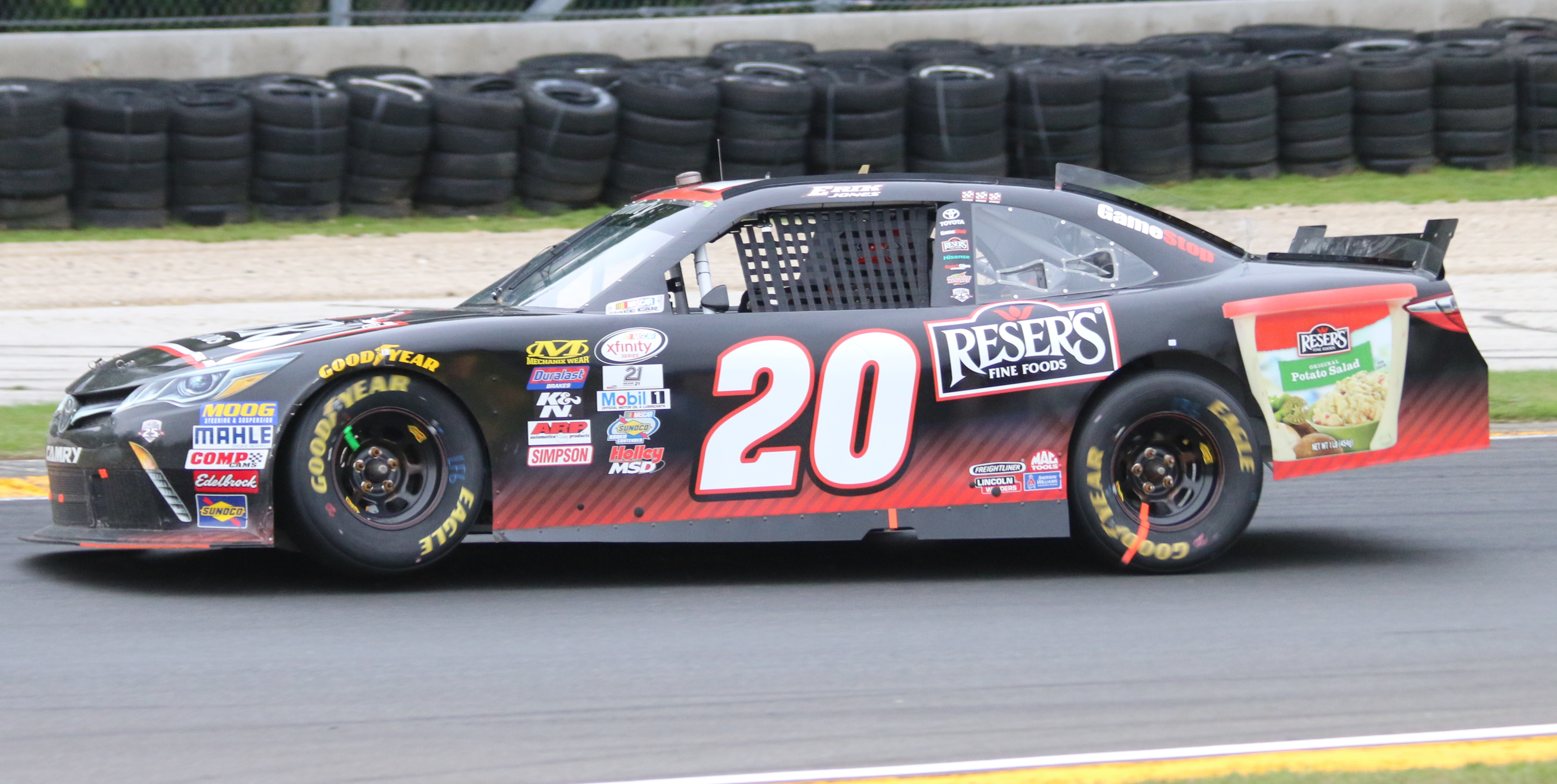
Jones' 2016 Xfinity Series car at Road America

On June 19, 2014, Joe Gibbs Racing announced that Jones will run three races with the team's No. 20 in the Nationwide Series after he became age-eligible. Jones would make his Nationwide Series debut a month later in the EnjoyIllinois.com 300 at Chicagoland Speedway. He would finish in the top ten in all three races.

==== 2015 ====
In 2015, Jones ran 25 races in the renamed Xfinity Series, splitting the No. 20 and No. 54 Toyotas for JGR. On April 10, 2015, Jones won his first Xfinity Series race at Texas Motor Speedway in the No. 20. Later in the year, Jones completed a weekend sweep, winning at Iowa in the Truck Series for the first time in 2015 and at Chicagoland in the Xfinity Series in the No. 54, battling Ryan Blaney for his second career Xfinity Series win.

==== 2016 ====
Jones started racing full-time in the Xfinity Series for JGR in 2016, driving the No. 20. Jones won his first race of the season at Bristol in April, holding off Kyle Larson and Kyle Busch on a late restart. He also won the $100,000 Dash 4 Cash bonus by being the highest-finishing Xfinity Series regular out of the four who qualified through the heat races. Jones won for the second time in 2016 at Dover in May, again winning the $100,000 Dash 4 Cash bonus. Jones then set the fastest time in qualifying for the Hisense 4K TV 300, winning the ninth straight pole for JGR. At Iowa in July, Jones scored his third win of the season, leading the most laps and passing Ty Dillon for the lead with fifteen laps to go. Jones won for the fourth time at Chicagoland in September, taking the lead with ten laps to go. With this win, Jones entered the Chase as the number one seed. Jones advanced through the Chase to the championship round at Homestead, where he would finish fourth in points behind Daniel Suárez, Elliott Sadler, and Justin Allgaier.

==== 2017 ====
In 2017, as he began racing full-time in the Cup Series, Jones ran a part-time Xfinity schedule. In April, he won back-to-back races at Texas and Bristol. In June, Jones joined Fox NASCAR's Cup drivers-only coverage of the Xfinity race at Pocono, working as a pit reporter alongside Ryan Blaney and Ricky Stenhouse Jr.

==== 2019 ====
Jones drove the XCI Racing No. 81 Toyota at the 2019 Food City 300 at Bristol, where he finished 37th after being involved in a multi-car pileup with Christopher Bell, Cole Custer, and Joey Logano.

==== 2021 ====
On August 2, 2021, it was announced that Jones would return to the Xfinity Series to run the race at Watkins Glen in the No. 31 for Jordan Anderson Racing. This was his first start in the series since leaving JGR and Toyota. He eventually crashed out of this race.

=== Cup Series ===
==== 2015 ====
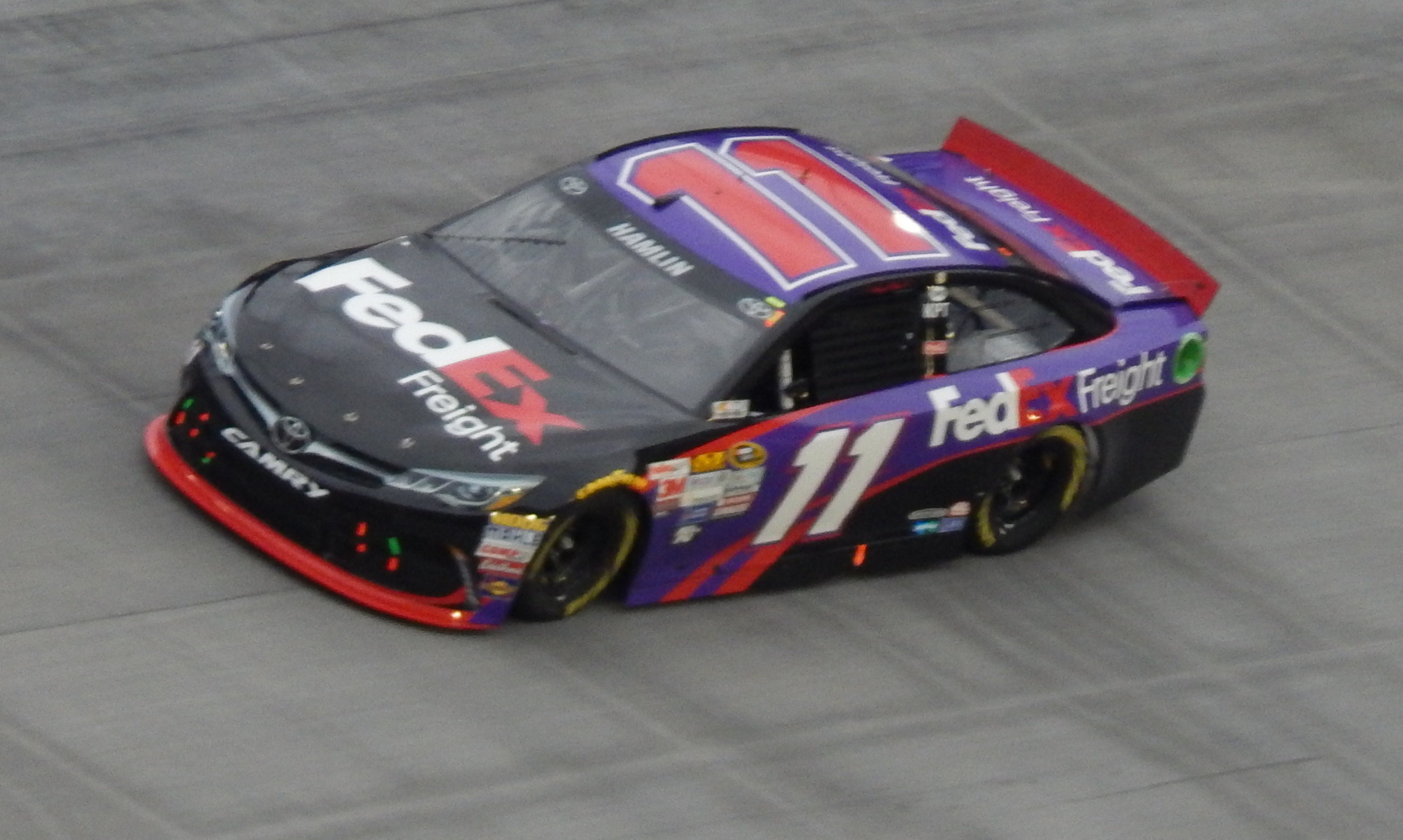
Jones made his unofficial Sprint Cup Series debut in substitution for Denny Hamlin.

Jones unofficially debuted in the Sprint Cup Series during the 2015 Food City 500, when he relieved Denny Hamlin in the No. 11 due to Hamlin's neck spasms. After taking over the car, which had been in fifth, he dropped to 37th for the restart, and despite falling to the point where he was two laps down, Jones managed to finish the race in 26th. Since Hamlin started the race, he was credited with the 26th-place finish.

It was then announced that he would drive the No. 18 Toyota Camry for Kyle Busch, who was recovering from a leg injury, at Kansas. In his official debut, Jones qualified twelfth and ran as high as first before crashing while running fourth. Jones ended up finishing 40th, 25 laps down.

Jones made his first career "triple duty" by running all three national series at the November Texas and Phoenix races. On November 4, he was announced as the driver of JGR's No. 20 car following the suspension of Matt Kenseth for his incident with Joey Logano at the Martinsville race the previous week. Jones finished twelfth after blowing a tire late at Texas Motor Speedway. He drove the car again at Phoenix International Raceway to a nineteenth-place finish.

==== 2017 ====
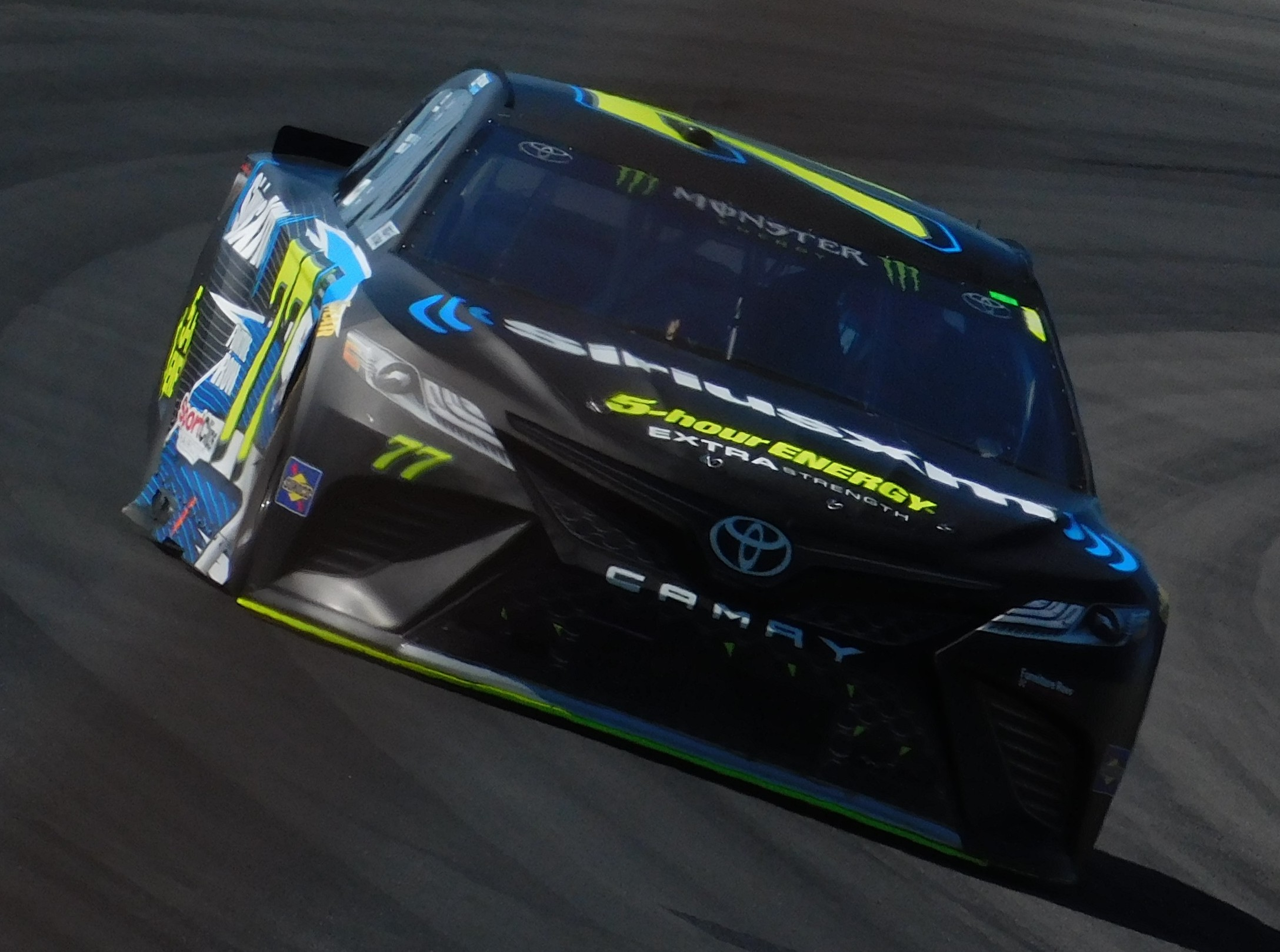
Jones at Pocono Raceway in 2017

For 2016, he originally planned to drive several races with JGR's fifth car. However, due to the charter system, which limits an owner to just four cars without any exception for rookie drivers, his Cup plans were put on hold.

On August 7, 2016, it was announced that Jones had signed a deal with Furniture Row Racing to drive in their new No. 77 car sponsored by 5-hour Energy, SiriusXM, and GameStop for the 2017 Monster Energy NASCAR Cup Series season.

On August 19, 2017, Jones dominated at Bristol, winning his first Cup Series pole and dominating early, but lost the lead late in the race to Kyle Busch, who would go on to win while Jones finished second. Jones led 260 laps in the race after leading only fifty in his 26 prior starts in the series.

==== 2018 ====
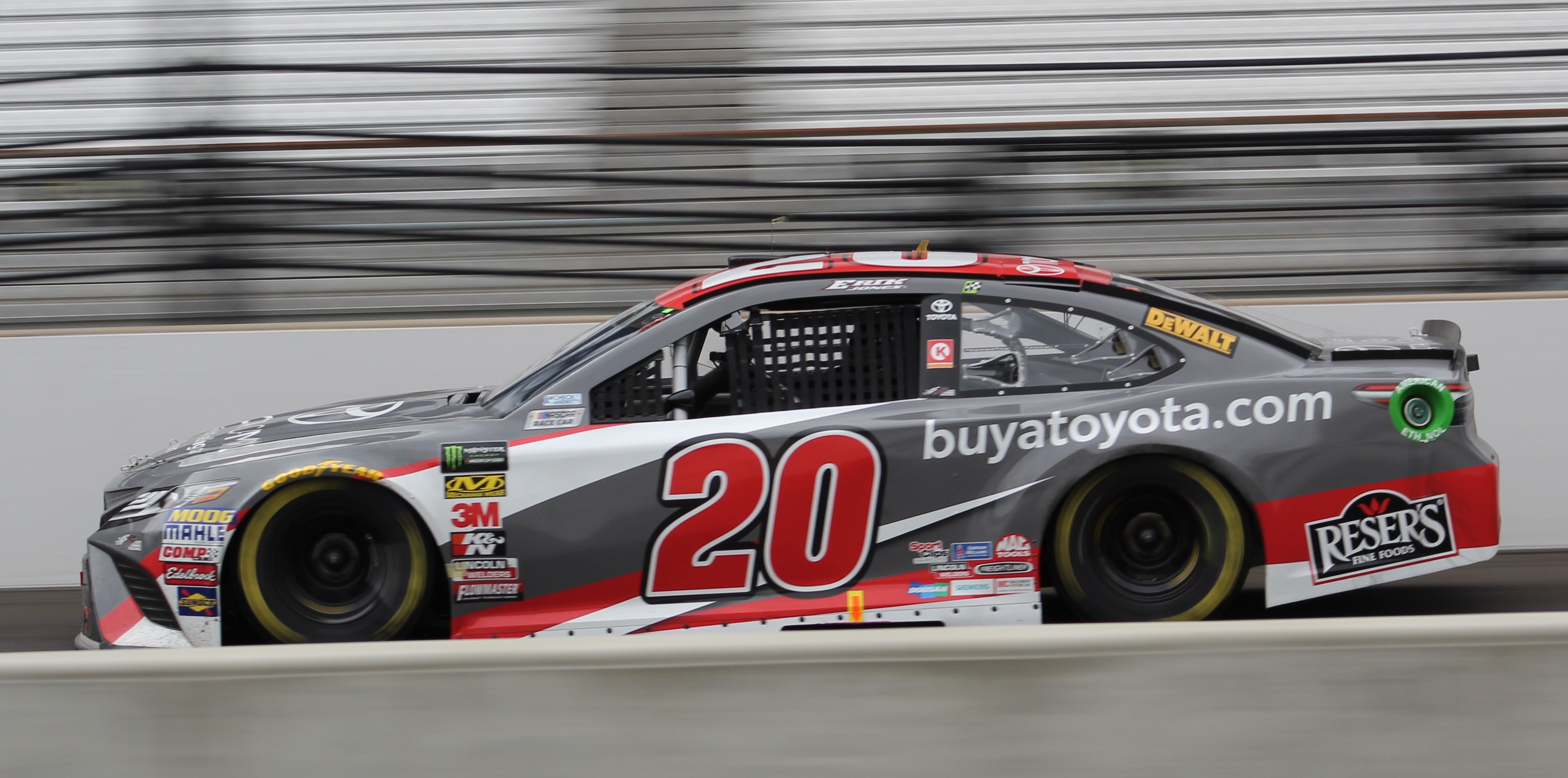
Jones at Indianapolis Motor Speedway in 2018

On July 11, 2017, it was announced that Jones would make the long-anticipated move to the JGR No. 20 car full-time in 2018, replacing Kenseth. This coincided with Furniture Row Racing's announcement that they would shut down the No. 77 team to focus on the No. 78 team with Martin Truex Jr., who would go on to win the 2017 MENCS Championship.

On July 7, 2018, Jones captured his first career Cup Series win at the 2018 Coke Zero Sugar 400 at Daytona International Speedway after going into overtime second alongside Truex Jr. but got a big push from Chris Buescher and held off Truex Jr. on the final lap. This win secured him in the Playoffs, but was eliminated in the Round of 16 after disastrous finishes at Las Vegas and the Charlotte Roval. Jones finished the season fifteenth in points.

==== 2019 ====
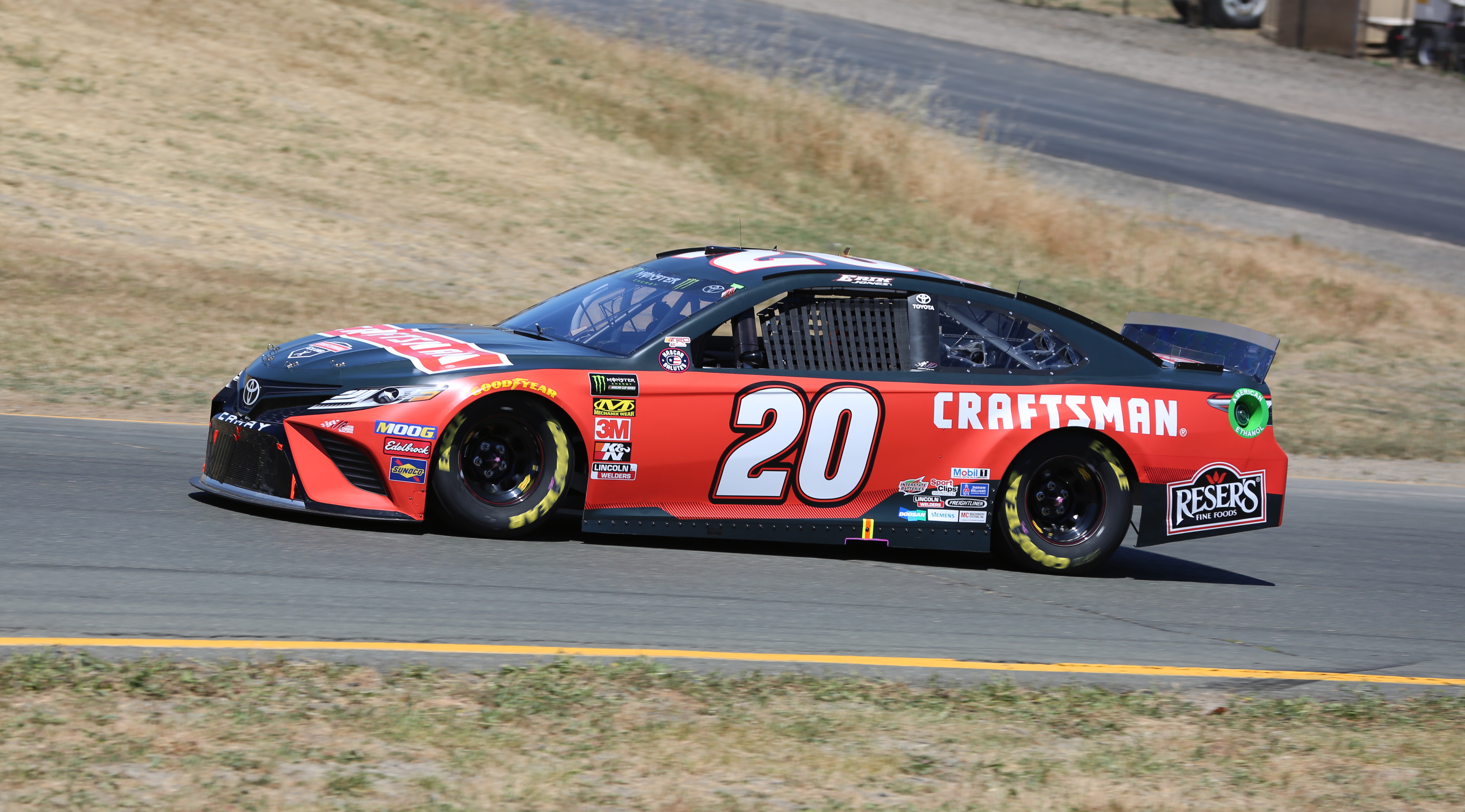
Jones at Sonoma Raceway in 2019

On September 2, 2019, Jones scored his second career Cup Series win at Darlington, securing him in the 2019 Playoffs. Four days later, he confirmed that he signed a contract extension with JGR to drive the No. 20 in 2020. Heading into the playoffs, Jones started 26th at Las Vegas, and worked his way up to the top 10 by the end of Stage 1. During the race, Jones reported that his throttle was stuck and that he had to go behind the wall. He returned to the track sixteen laps down. Jones ultimately finished 36th, 26 points from the cutoff line. At Richmond, Jones ran in the top-ten in the latter part of the night and was able to finish fourth, but was disqualified when his car was discovered to have a rear-wheel alignment issue during post-race inspection. He left Richmond 45 points down from the cutoff line. Jones was in a must-win situation heading to the Charlotte Roval. However, coming to a restart, Jones was involved in a multi-car incident heading into turn 1. The damage was significant enough to puncture his radiator and eliminate him from the Round of 16.

==== 2020 ====
Jones kicked off 2020 by winning the Busch Clash; despite being involved in three accidents towards the end of the race, further wrecks on the field led to multiple overtime attempts. In the third overtime, Jones received a push from Hamlin on the final lap to win. In August 2020, after fellow Toyota team Leavine Family Racing announced the sale of their team, it was announced that JGR would be parting ways with Jones at season's end, ending a long-time relationship that dated back to 2012. Jones would end up missing the playoffs after being involved in a wreck at Daytona, a race he would need to win to lock himself in. Jones would go winless for the first time since his rookie season in 2017 and finish seventeenth in points.

==== 2021 ====
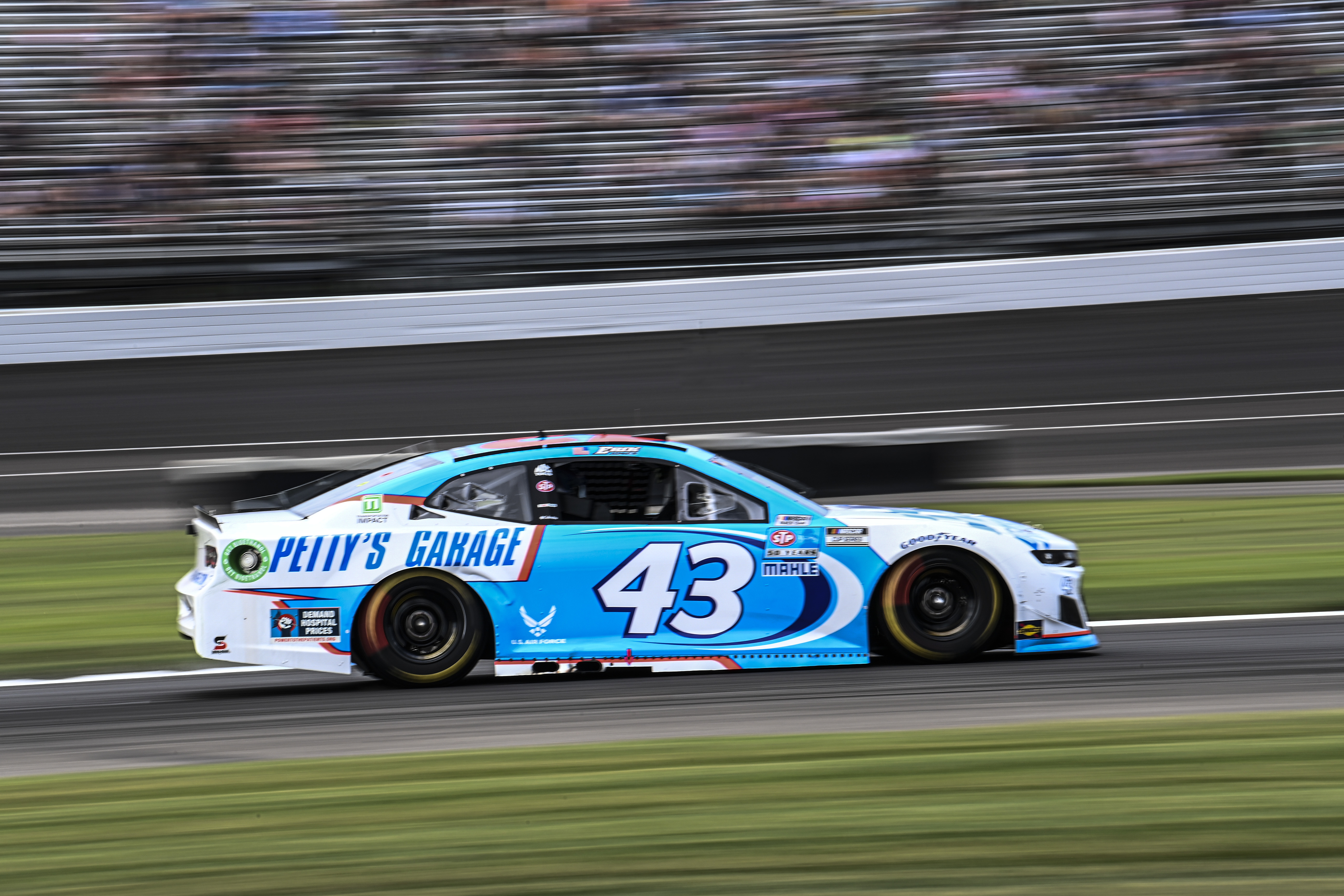
Jones in the No. 43 at Indianapolis Motor Speedway in 2021

On October 21, 2020, Jones was confirmed to drive the Richard Petty Motorsports No. 43 entry in 2021, replacing Bubba Wallace. Jones ended the season 24th in the point standings.

==== 2022 ====
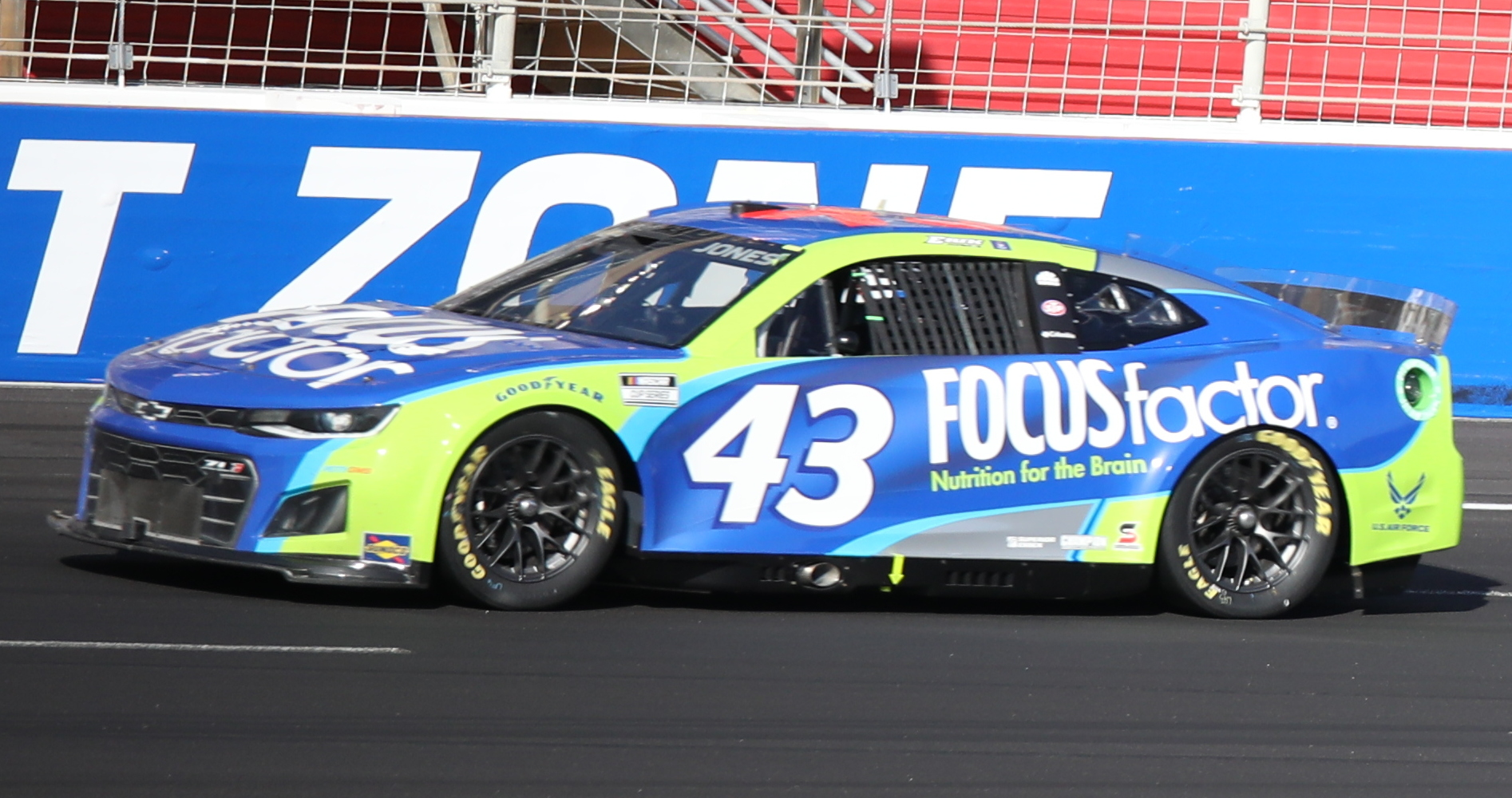
Jones in the No. 43 at Atlanta Motor Speedway in 2022

On August 22, 2021, it was revealed that Jones would remain in the No. 43 for the 2022 season as he will be sponsored by FocusFactor in 26 races. RPM was eventually purchased by GMS Racing to form Petty GMS, and Jones was joined by Ty Dillon as teammate. At California, Jones scored his first top-five since 2020 by finishing third. Prior to the Pocono race, the No. 43 was docked 35 driver and owner points for an L1 penalty when the pre-race inspection revealed issues on the car's rocker box vent hole. Despite not making the playoffs, Jones won at Darlington, giving Petty GMS its first win. In addition, he gave the No. 43 its first win since 2014 and its overall 200th win. Jones ended the season eighteenth in the points standings.

==== 2023 ====
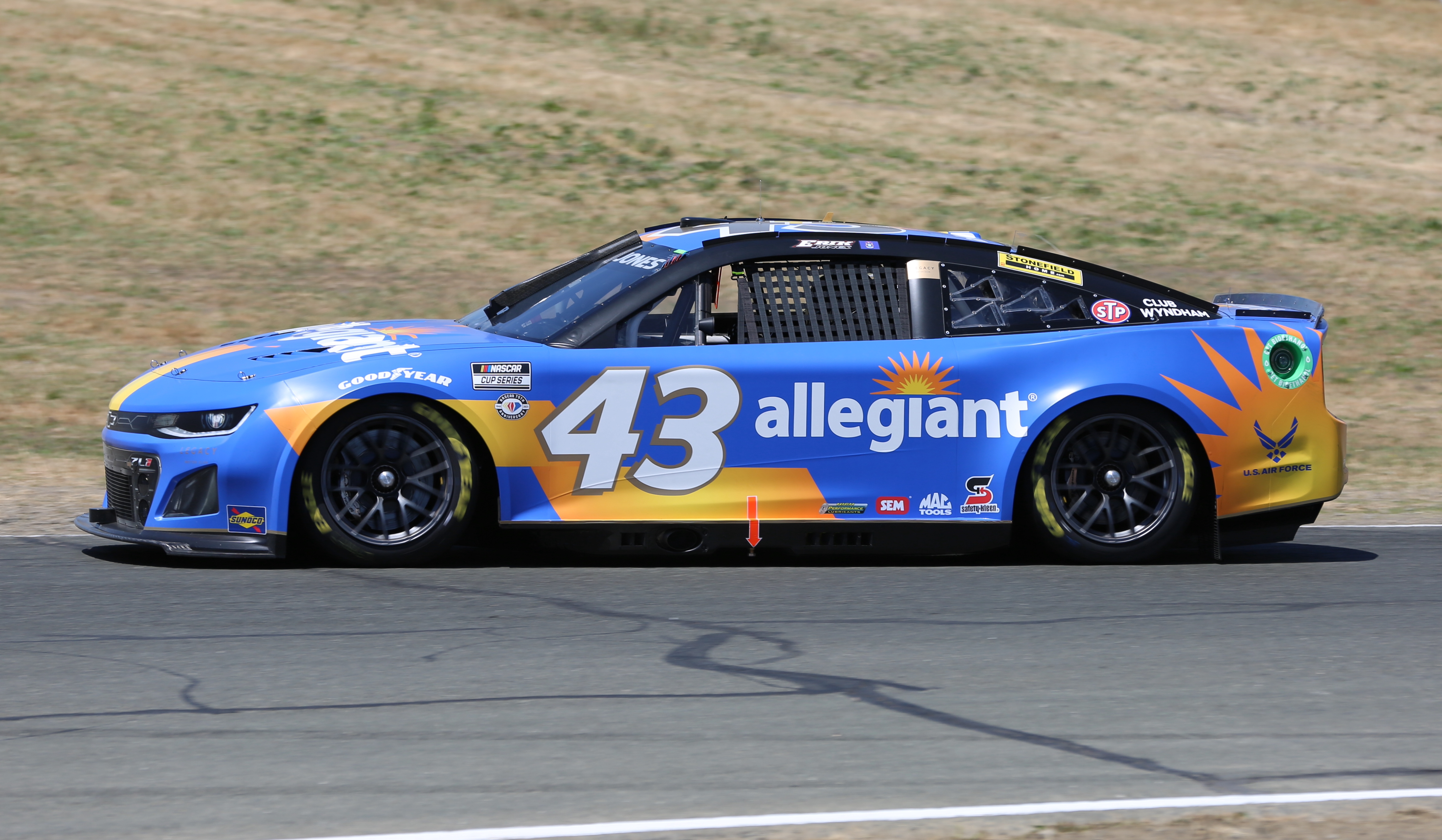
Jones in the No. 43 at Sonoma Raceway in 2023

Jones started the 2023 season with hard rock band Guns N' Roses sponsoring the No. 43 for the 2023 Daytona 500, where he finished 37th after wrecking out early. At Talladega, Jones earned his third consecutive sixth place finish at the track (he finished sixth in both races in 2022), and claim his second top-ten of the season. On June 7, following the Gateway race, NASCAR gave the No. 43 an L1 penalty after a post-race inspection revealed illegal modifications to the car's greenhouse. As a result, the team was docked 60 driver and owner points and five playoff points. In addition, crew chief Dave Elenz was fined US$75,000 and suspended for two races. After a 32nd place finish at Sonoma, Jones finished sixteenth or better in the next five consecutive races, including an eighth place finish at Nashville and a 9th place finish at Pocono. Jones earned his fifth top-ten of the season at Michigan, finishing tenth. At Kansas, Jones started on the front row for an overtime restart after a two-tire gamble. After battling Joey Logano for the lead, Tyler Reddick passed them both coming to the white flag. Jones ultimately finished third, his first top-five since his victory at the 2022 Cook Out Southern 500 and his seventh top-ten of the season. Additionally, this was LMC’s first top-five finish as an organization. Jones ended the season 27th in the points standings, with seven top-tens and one top-five.

==== 2024 ====
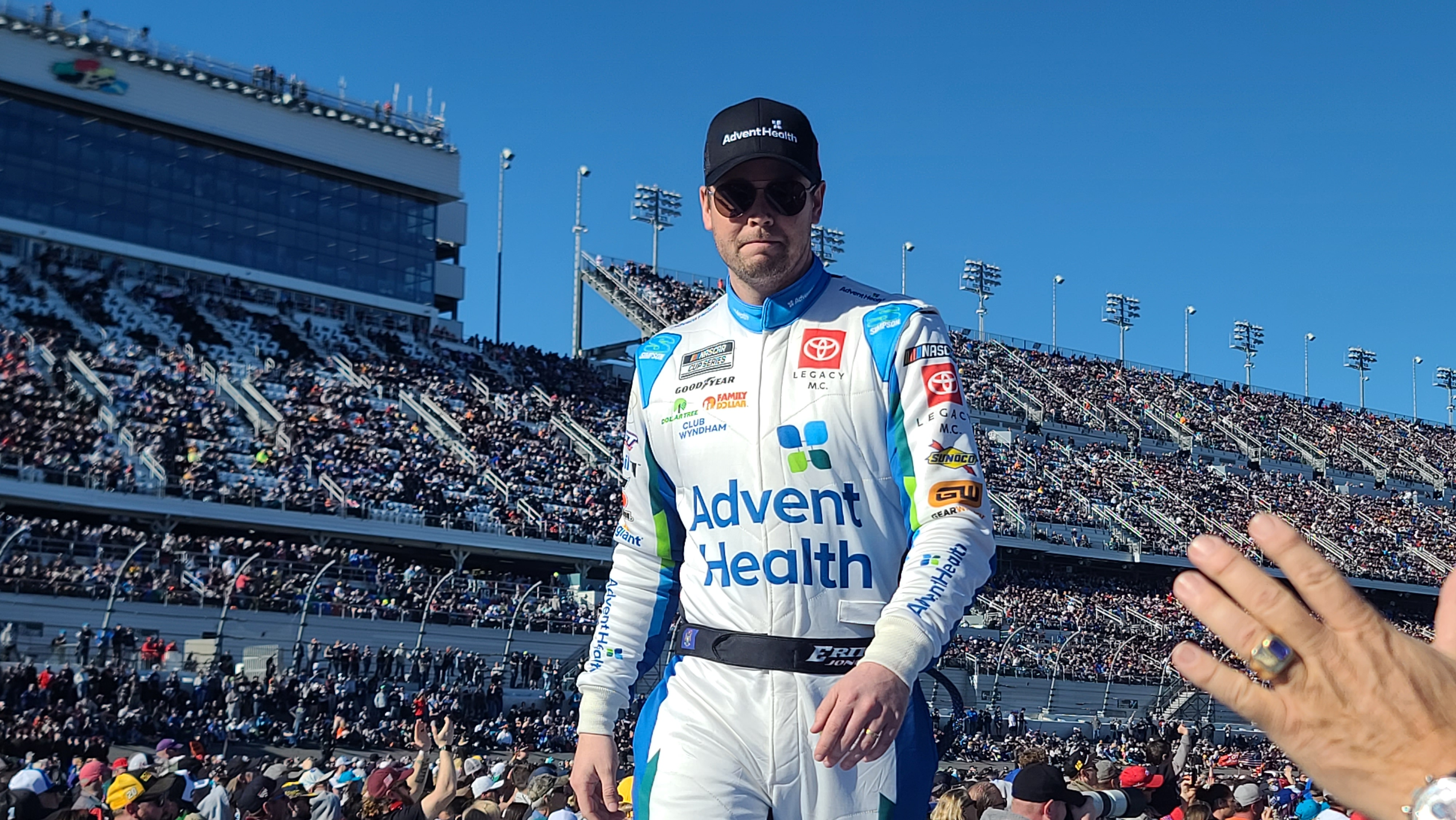
Legacy Motor Club's Erik Jones is introduced at the 2024 Daytona 500

Jones started the 2024 Season with an eighth-place finish in the Daytona 500. During the GEICO 500 at Talladega, on lap 156, Jones hit the wall hard in a four-car wreck. Jones was complaining about his back, but managed to get out of the car on his own. He was released from the infield care center, but a couple of hours later, he returned to the care center, where it was decided to take him to the hospital for further evaluation. Jones later announced that he had suffered a compression fracture in a lower vertebra and would miss Dover. Corey Heim will be the substitute driver until he recovered. On May 2, it was announced that Jones was cleared to race but would not drive at Kansas instead would return to racing at Darlington. As Legacy Motor Club struggled to grind out results, Jones once again only managed one top-five finish with fifth place at the fall Talladega race and ended up 28th in the points standings. Results during the year had become so dire that Jones's crew chief Dave Elenz was replaced by Ben Benshore, the crew chief of teammate John Hunter Nemechek, for the final five weekends. Despite this, the Michigander extended his contract at Legacy, penning a multi-year deal.

==== 2025 ====
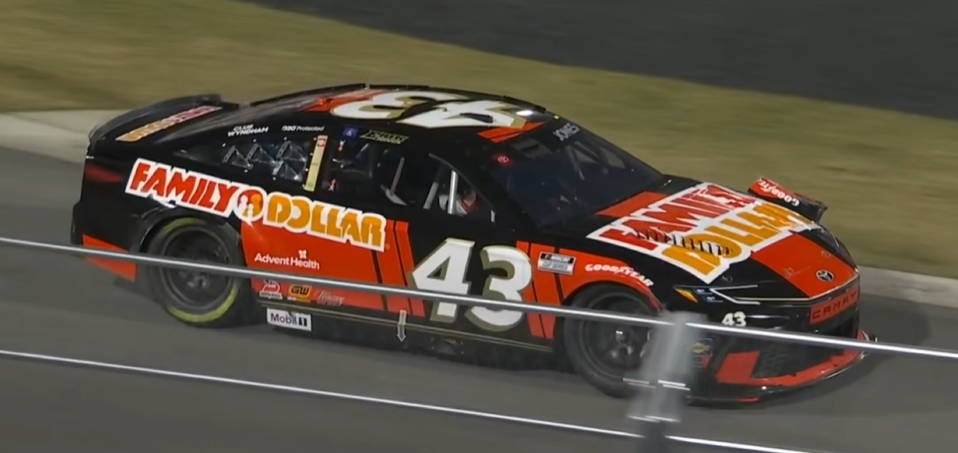
Jones at Bowman Gray Stadium in 2025.

Jones started the 2025 season with a twelfth place finish at the 2025 Daytona 500. Following the spring Martinsville race, he was disqualified after the car failed to meet the minimum weight requirements. After failing to make the playoffs, he scored two consecutive top-five finishes at Daytona and at the Darlington. He finished twenty-fourth in the points.

==== 2026 ====
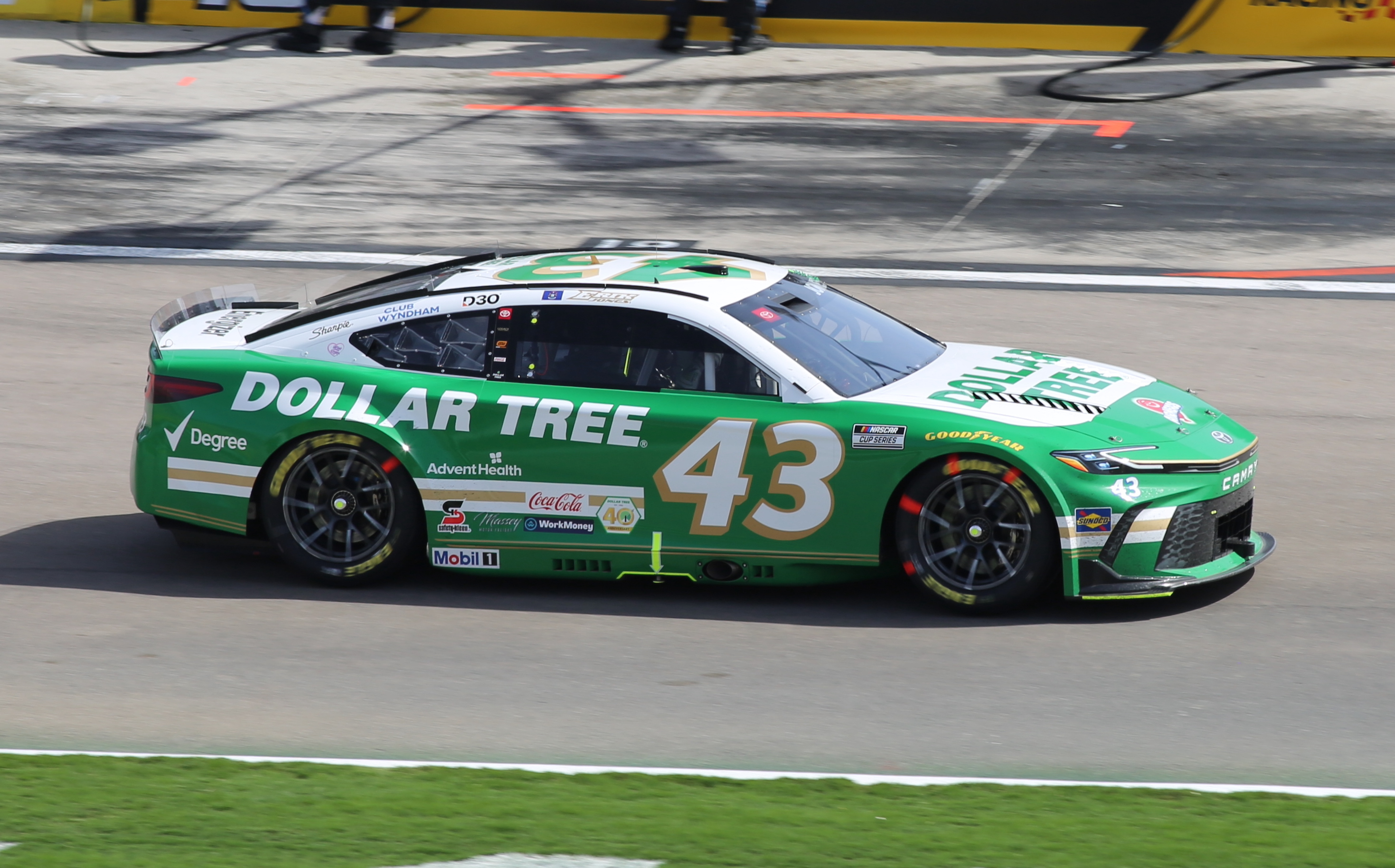
Jones' No. 43 at Las Vegas Motor Speedway in 2026

Jones started the 2026 season with a twenty-first place finish at the 2026 Daytona 500. At Texas, Jones won his first career stage.

==== 2027 ====
On September 27, 2026, Jones signed a contract extension with Legacy Motor Club.

== Personal life ==
Jones, born May 30, 1996, in Byron, Michigan, is a graduate of Swartz Creek Academy. Jones received his high school diploma at Texas Motor Speedway before the WinStar World Casino 400K Camping World Truck Series race on June 6, 2014.

He currently lives in Cornelius, North Carolina. He has a younger sister, Lindsey. Jones is also an avid reader; he started a series on Facebook in April 2020 called Erik's Reading Circle, where he reads various children's books and takes suggestions for books to read in the following weeks. He also hosts a book club called Erik's Reading Circle on his website.

He started dating race car driver Holly Shelton in 2018. They were married on August 2, 2023.

== Motorsports career results ==
=== Racing career summary ===
Season	Series	Team	Races	Wins	Top 5	Top 10	Points	Position
2012	ARCA Racing Series	Venturini Motorsports	10	0	4	5	1565	21st
2013	ARCA Racing Series	Venturini Motorsports	4	1	2	3	855	33rd
2013	NASCAR Camping World Truck Series	Kyle Busch Motorsports	5	1	2	5	195	29th
2014	NASCAR Camping World Truck Series	Kyle Busch Motorsports	12	3	5	8	426	18th
2014	NASCAR Nationwide Series	Joe Gibbs Racing	3	0	0	0	0	NC†
2015	NASCAR Camping World Truck Series	Kyle Busch Motorsports	23	3	11	20	899	**1st**
2015	NASCAR Xfinity Series	Joe Gibbs Racing	23	2	13	17	0	NC†
2015	NASCAR Sprint Cup Series	Joe Gibbs Racing	3	0	0	0	0	NC†
2016	NASCAR Camping World Truck Series	Kyle Busch Motorsports	1	0	1	1	0	NC†
2016	NASCAR Xfinity Series	Joe Gibbs Racing	33	4	15	20	4032	4th
2017	NASCAR Xfinity Series	Joe Gibbs Racing	18	3	9	10	0	NC†
2017	Monster Energy NASCAR Cup Series	Furniture Row Racing	36	0	5	14	863	19th
2018	NASCAR K&N Pro Series West	DGR-Crosley	1	0	0	1	38	37th
2018	NASCAR K&N Pro Series East	DGR-Crosley	1	0	0	0	26	57th
2018	NASCAR Camping World Truck Series	Kyle Busch Motorsports	1	0	1	1	0	NC†
2018	Monster Energy NASCAR Cup Series	Joe Gibbs Racing	36	1	9	18	2220	15th
2019	NASCAR Xfinity Series	XCI Racing	1	0	0	0	0	NC†
2019	Monster Energy NASCAR Cup Series	Joe Gibbs Racing	36	1	10	17	2194	16th
2020	NASCAR Gander Outdoors Truck Series	Wauters Motorsports	0	0	0	0	0	NC†
2020	NASCAR Cup Series	Joe Gibbs Racing	36	0	9	13	873	17th
2021	NASCAR Xfinity Series	Jordan Anderson Racing	1	0	0	0	0	NC†
2021	NASCAR Cup Series	Richard Petty Motorsports	36	0	0	6	641	24th
2022	NASCAR Cup Series	Petty GMS Motorsports	36	1	3	13	631	18th
2023	ASA STARS National Tour	Erik Jones Racing	0	0	0	0	5	116th
2023	NASCAR Cup Series	Legacy Motor Club	36	0	1	7	578	27th
2024	NASCAR Cup Series	Legacy Motor Club	34	0	1	2	516	28th
2025	ASA STARS National Tour	Erik Jones Racing	1	0	0	0	45	52nd
2025	NASCAR Cup Series	Legacy Motor Club	36	0	4	5	665	24th
2026	NASCAR Cup Series	Legacy Motor Club					TBD	TBD

^{†} As Jones was a guest driver, he was ineligible for championship points.

=== NASCAR ===
(key) (Bold – Pole position awarded by time. Italics – Pole position earned by points standings or practice time. * – Most laps led.)

==== Cup Series ====
NASCAR Cup Series results
Year	Team	No.	Make	1	2	3	4	5	6	7	8	9	10	11	12	13	14	15	16	17	18	19	20	21	22	23	24	25	26	27	28	29	30	31	32	33	34	35	36	NCSC	Pts	Ref
2015	Joe Gibbs Racing	11	Toyota	DAY	ATL	LVS	PHO	CAL	MAR	TEX	BRI; RL^{†}	RCH	TAL																											54th	0^{1}	
2015	Joe Gibbs Racing	18	Toyota											KAN; 40	CLT	DOV	POC	MCH	SON	DAY	KEN	NHA	IND	POC	GLN	MCH	BRI	DAR	RCH	CHI	NHA	DOV	CLT	KAN	TAL	MAR				54th	0^{1}	
2015	Joe Gibbs Racing	20	Toyota																																		TEX; 12	PHO; 19	HOM	54th	0^{1}	
2017	Furniture Row Racing	77	Toyota	DAY; 39	ATL; 14	LVS; 15	PHO; 8	CAL; 12	MAR; 12	TEX; 22	BRI; 17	RCH; 38	TAL; 33	KAN; 22	CLT; 7	DOV; 15	POC; 3	MCH; 13	SON; 25	DAY; 9	KEN; 6	NHA; 39	IND; 31	POC; 8	GLN; 10	MCH; 3	**BRI**; 2*	DAR; 5	RCH; 6	CHI; 33	NHA; 6	DOV; 12	CLT; 17	TAL; 36	KAN; 35	MAR; 26	TEX; 10	PHO; 4	HOM; 21	19th	863	
2018	Joe Gibbs Racing	20	Toyota	DAY; 36	ATL; 11	LVS; 8	PHO; 9	CAL; 7	MAR; 17	TEX; 4	BRI; 26	RCH; 13	TAL; 39	DOV; 18	KAN; 7	CLT; 19	POC; 29	MCH; 15	SON; 7	CHI; 6	DAY; 1	KEN; 7	NHA; 16	POC; 5	GLN; 5	MCH; 13	BRI; 5	DAR; 8	IND; 2	**LVS**; 40	RCH; 11	ROV; 30	DOV; 4	TAL; 8	KAN; 4	MAR; 26	TEX; 4	PHO; 17	HOM; 30	15th	2220	
2019	Joe Gibbs Racing	20	Toyota	DAY; 3	ATL; 7	LVS; 13	PHO; 29	CAL; 19	MAR; 30	TEX; 4	BRI; 24	RCH; 14	TAL; 19	DOV; 6	KAN; 3	CLT; 40	POC; 3	MCH; 31	SON; 8	CHI; 7	DAY; 23	KEN; 3	NHA; 3	POC; 2	GLN; 4	MCH; 18	BRI; 22	DAR; 1	IND; 39	LVS; 36	RCH; 38	ROV; 40	DOV; 15	TAL; 34	KAN; 7	MAR; 20	TEX; 10	PHO; 7	HOM; 3	16th	2194	
2020	Joe Gibbs Racing	20	Toyota	DAY; 18	LVS; 23	CAL; 10	PHO; 28	DAR; 8	DAR; 5	CLT; 11	CLT; 26	BRI; 5	ATL; 28	MAR; 20	HOM; 21	TAL; 5	POC; 38	POC; 3	IND; 33	KEN; 22	TEX; 6	KAN; 5	NHA; 24	MCH; 11	MCH; 27	DRC; 11	DOV; 12	DOV; 22	DAY; 35	DAR; 4	RCH; 22	BRI; 3	LVS; 8	TAL; 2	ROV; 3	KAN; 20	TEX; 21	MAR; 12	PHO; 22	17th	873	
2021	Richard Petty Motorsports	43	Chevy	DAY; 39	DRC; 14	HOM; 27	LVS; 10	PHO; 20	ATL; 24	BRD; 9	MAR; 30	RCH; 19	TAL; 27	KAN; 25	DAR; 18	DOV; 22	COA; 16	CLT; 16	SON; 11	NSH; 19	POC; 22	POC; 31	ROA; 19	ATL; 24	NHA; 19	GLN; 27	IRC; 7	MCH; 18	DAY; 11	DAR; 32	RCH; 21	BRI; 8	LVS; 26	TAL; 9	ROV; 17	TEX; 12	KAN; 29	MAR; 8	PHO; 22	24th	641	
2022	Petty GMS Motorsports	43	Chevy	DAY; 29	CAL; 3	LVS; 31	PHO; 25	ATL; 14	COA; 9	RCH; 23	MAR; 13	BRD; 24	TAL; 6	DOV; 10	DAR; 25	KAN; 32	CLT; 14	GTW; 7	SON; 22	NSH; 11	ROA; 26	ATL; 4	NHA; 19	POC; 9	IRC; 15	MCH; 8	RCH; 35	GLN; 10	DAY; 17	DAR; 1	KAN; 29	BRI; 21	TEX; 6	TAL; 6	ROV; 11	LVS; 8	HOM; 30	MAR; 18	PHO; 14	18th	831	
2023	Legacy Motor Club	43	Chevy	DAY; 37	CAL; 19	LVS; 19	PHO; 21	ATL; 8	COA; 23	RCH; 31	BRD; 14	MAR; 31	TAL; 6	DOV; 16	KAN; 21	DAR; 25	CLT; 32	GTW; 18	SON; 32	NSH; 8	CSC; 16	ATL; 11	NHA; 11	POC; 9	RCH; 23	MCH; 10	IRC; 36	GLN; 29	DAY; 18	DAR; 10	KAN; 3	BRI; 24	TEX; 30	TAL; 26	ROV; 36	LVS; 28	HOM; 14	MAR; 21	PHO; 20	27th	578	
2024	Legacy Motor Club	43	Toyota	DAY; 8	ATL; 25	LVS; 14	PHO; 31	BRI; 20	COA; 32	RCH; 14	MAR; 12	TEX; 19	TAL; 35	DOV	KAN	DAR; 19	CLT; 19	GTW; 26	SON; 19	IOW; 32	NHA; 13	NSH; 34	CSC; 29	POC; 14	IND; 28	RCH; 29	MCH; 16	DAY; 17	DAR; 24	ATL; 26	GLN; 33	BRI; 30	KAN; 35	TAL; 5	ROV; 33	LVS; 25	HOM; 22	MAR; 19	PHO; 22	28th	516	
2025	Legacy Motor Club	43	Toyota	DAY; 12	ATL; 31	COA; 27	PHO; 18	LVS; 27	HOM; 15	MAR; 38	DAR; 17	BRI; 26	TAL; 18	TEX; 5	KAN; 32	CLT; 13	NSH; 7	MCH; 11	MXC; 17	POC; 13	ATL; 5	CSC; 25	SON; 29	DOV; 27	IND; 36	IOW; 16	GLN; 12	RCH; 26	DAY; 5	DAR; 3	GTW; 21	BRI; 20	NHA; 28	KAN; 16	ROV; 30	LVS; 15	TAL; 35	MAR; 34	PHO; 16	24th	665	
2026	Legacy Motor Club	43	Toyota	DAY; 21	ATL; 24	COA; 34	PHO; 10	LVS; 20	DAR; 10	MAR; 21	BRI; 23	KAN; 23	TAL; 23	TEX; 12	GLN; 19	CLT; 13	NSH; 11	MCH; 2	POC; 6	COR; 20	SON; 23	CHI; 15	ATL; 5	NWS; 21	IND; 27	IOW; 35	RCH; 27	NHA; 33	DAY; 39	DAR; 15	GTW; 13	BRI; 32	KAN; 16	LVS; 25	CLT; 24	PHO; 25	TAL; 28	MAR; 29	HOM; 20	23rd	643	
^{†} – Relieved Denny Hamlin

===== Daytona 500 =====
Year	Team	Manufacturer	Start	Finish
2017	Furniture Row Racing	Toyota	34	39
2018	Joe Gibbs Racing	Toyota	8	36
2019	Joe Gibbs Racing	Toyota	28	3
2020	Joe Gibbs Racing	Toyota	14	18
2021	Richard Petty Motorsports	Chevrolet	31	39
2022	Petty GMS Motorsports	Chevrolet	13	29
2023	Legacy Motor Club	Chevrolet	25	37
2024	Legacy Motor Club	Toyota	11	8
2025	Legacy Motor Club	Toyota	4	12
2026	Legacy Motor Club	Toyota	24	21

==== Xfinity Series ====
NASCAR Xfinity Series results
Year	Team	No.	Make	1	2	3	4	5	6	7	8	9	10	11	12	13	14	15	16	17	18	19	20	21	22	23	24	25	26	27	28	29	30	31	32	33	NXSC	Pts	Ref
2014	Joe Gibbs Racing	20	Toyota	DAY	PHO	LVS	BRI	CAL	TEX	DAR	RCH	TAL	IOW	CLT	DOV	MCH	ROA	KEN	DAY	NHA	CHI; 7	IND	IOW	GLN	MOH	BRI; 8	ATL	RCH	CHI	KEN	DOV	KAN	CLT	TEX	PHO; 6	HOM	91st	0^{1}	
2015	Joe Gibbs Racing	20	Toyota	DAY; 18		LVS; 29		**CAL**; 3	**TEX**; 1*	**BRI**; 4		TAL; 30	IOW; 3	CLT; 15					KEN; 2	NHA	IND; 34							RCH; 5	CHI			CLT; 2	KAN	TEX; 4	PHO; 3	HOM; 3	85th	0^{1}	
2015	Joe Gibbs Racing	54	Toyota		ATL; 13		PHO; 5				RCH; 4				DOV; 9*	MCH	CHI; 1*	DAY; 8				IOW; 7	GLN	MOH	BRI	ROA	DAR			KEN; 8	DOV						85th	0^{1}	
2016	Joe Gibbs Racing	20	Toyota	DAY; 31	ATL; 3	LVS; 3	**PHO**; 2	CAL; 15	TEX; 2	**BRI**; 1	RCH; 34	TAL; 21	**DOV**; 1*	**CLT**; 31	**POC**; 2	MCH; 4	**IOW**; 27	DAY; 10	KEN; 4	NHA; 2	IND; 22	IOW; 1*	GLN; 12	MOH; 6	**BRI**; 33	ROA; 21	DAR; 6	RCH; 2	CHI; 1	**KEN**; 28*	**DOV**; 16	CLT; 5	KAN; 15	TEX; 4	PHO; 10	HOM; 9	4th	4032	
2017	Joe Gibbs Racing	20	Toyota	DAY; 32	ATL	LVS	PHO; 3	CAL; 4	TEX; 1*	BRI; 1	RCH	TAL; 5	CLT	DOV; 35	POC	MCH	IOW	DAY; 25	KEN; 3*	NHA	IND; 23	IOW	GLN; 8	MOH	BRI	ROA	DAR; 4	RCH	**CHI**; 18*	KEN	DOV; 20	CLT; 30	KAN; 15*	**TEX**; 1*	**PHO**; 3	HOM	87th	0^{1}	
2019	XCI Racing	81	Toyota	DAY	ATL	LVS	PHO	CAL	TEX	BRI	RCH	TAL	DOV	CLT	POC	MCH	IOW	CHI	DAY	KEN	NHA	IOW	GLN	MOH	BRI; 37	ROA	DAR	IND	LVS	RCH	ROV	DOV	KAN	TEX	PHO	HOM	106th	0^{1}	
2021	Jordan Anderson Racing	31	Chevy	DAY	DRC	HOM	LVS	PHO	ATL	MAR	TAL	DAR	DOV	COA	CLT	MOH	TEX	NSH	POC	ROA	ATL	NHA	GLN; 36	IRC	MCH	DAY	DAR	RCH	BRI	LVS	TAL	ROV	TEX	KAN	MAR	PHO	105th	0^{1}	

==== Gander RV & Outdoors Truck Series ====
NASCAR Gander RV & Outdoors Truck Series results
Year	Team	No.	Make	1	2	3	4	5	6	7	8	9	10	11	12	13	14	15	16	17	18	19	20	21	22	23	NGTC	Pts	Ref
2013	Kyle Busch Motorsports	51	Toyota	DAY	MAR; 9	CAR; 9	KAN	CLT	DOV	TEX	KEN	IOW; 2	ELD	POC	MCH	BRI	MSP	IOW; 9	CHI	LVS	TAL	MAR	TEX	PHO; 1*	HOM		29th	195	
2014	Kyle Busch Motorsports	51	Toyota	DAY	MAR; 18	KAN	CLT	DOV	TEX; 11	GTW; 23	KEN	IOW; 1*	**ELD**; 29	POC; 6	MCH	BRI	MSP; 3	CHI	NHA; 7	LVS; 1	TAL; 6	MAR; 4	TEX	**PHO**; 1*	HOM		18th	426	
2015	Kyle Busch Motorsports	4	Toyota	DAY; 2	ATL; 7	MAR; 3	**KAN**; 11*	CLT; 2*	DOV; 3	**TEX**; 15	GTW; 23*	**IOW**; 1*	KEN; 2*	ELD; 4	**POC**; 10	MCH; 3	BRI; 6	MSP; 1	CHI; 6	NHA; 7	LVS; 9	TAL; 4	MAR; 10	TEX; 1*	**PHO**; 9*	HOM; 6	1st	899	
2016	Kyle Busch Motorsports	51	Toyota	DAY	ATL	MAR	KAN	DOV	CLT	TEX	IOW	GTW; 5	KEN	ELD	POC	BRI	MCH	MSP	CHI	NHA	LVS	TAL	MAR	TEX	PHO	HOM	85th	0^{1}	
2018	Kyle Busch Motorsports	18	Toyota	DAY	ATL	LVS	MAR	DOV	KAN	CLT	TEX	IOW	GTW	CHI	KEN	ELD	POC; 2	MCH	BRI	MSP	LVS	TAL	MAR	TEX	PHO	HOM	93rd	0^{1}	
2020	Wauters Motorsports	5	Toyota	DAY	LVS	CLT; DNQ	ATL	HOM	POC	KEN	TEX	KAN	KAN	MCH	DRC	DOV	GTW	DAR	RCH	BRI	LVS	TAL	KAN	TEX	MAR	PHO	—	0^{1}	

^{*} Season still in progress
^{1} Ineligible for series points

=== ARCA Racing Series ===
(key) (Bold – Pole position awarded by qualifying time. Italics – Pole position earned by points standings or practice time. * – Most laps led.)

ARCA Racing Series results
Year	Team	No.	Make	1	2	3	4	5	6	7	8	9	10	11	12	13	14	15	16	17	18	19	20	21	ARSC	Pts	Ref
2012	Venturini Motorsports	55	Chevy	DAY	MOB; 29	SLM; 5	TAL		ELK; 8	POC	MCH	WIN; 3	NJE	IOW; 11	CHI	IRP; 33	POC	BLN; 3	ISF	MAD; 4	SLM; 27	DSF	KAN		21st	1565	
2012	Venturini Motorsports	55	Toyota					TOL; 26																	21st	1565	
2013	Venturini Motorsports	15	Toyota	DAY	MOB	SLM	TAL	TOL	ELK	POC; 2	MCH	ROA	WIN	CHI	NJE	POC; 12*	BLN; 1*	ISF	MAD	DSF	IOW	SLM	KEN; 6	KAN	33rd	855	

==== K&N Pro Series East ====
NASCAR K&N Pro Series East results
Year	Team	No.	Make	1	2	3	4	5	6	7	8	9	10	11	12	13	14	NKNPSEC	Pts	Ref
2018	DGR-Crosley	20	Toyota	NSM	BRI	LGY	SBO	SBO	MEM	NJM	TMP	NHA	IOW	GLN; 19	GTW	NHA	DOV	57th	26	

==== K&N Pro Series West ====
NASCAR K&N Pro Series West results
Year	Team	No.	Make	1	2	3	4	5	6	7	8	9	10	11	12	13	14	NKNPSWC	Pts	Ref
2018	DGR-Crosley	20	Toyota	KCR	TUS	TUS	OSS	CNS	SON; 6	DCS	IOW	EVG	GTW	LVS	MER	AAS	KCR	37th	38	

=== ASA STARS National Tour ===
(key) (Bold – Pole position awarded by qualifying time. Italics – Pole position earned by points standings or practice time. * – Most laps led. ** – All laps led.)

ASA STARS National Tour results
Year	Team	No.	Make	1	2	3	4	5	6	7	8	9	10	11	12	ASNTC	Pts	Ref
2023	Erik Jones Racing	4	Chevy	FIF	MAD	NWS; DNQ	HCY	MLW	AND	WIR	TOL	WIN	NSV			116th	5	
2025	Erik Jones Racing	4	Toyota	NSM	FIF	DOM	HCY	NPS	MAD	SLG	AND	OWO; 16	TOL	WIN	NSV	52nd	45	

Sporting positions
Preceded by Chase Elliott	NASCAR Cup Series Rookie of the Year; 2017	Succeeded by William Byron
Achievements
Preceded by Brad Keselowski; Denny Hamlin	Southern 500 Winner; 2019, 2022	Succeeded by Kevin Harvick; Kyle Larson
Preceded by Chase Elliott	Snowball Derby Winner; 2012, 2013	Succeeded by John Hunter Nemechek
Preceded by Matt Crafton	NASCAR Camping World Truck Series Champion; 2015	Succeeded by Johnny Sauter
