= 2016 Speediatrics 200 =

8th race of the 2016 NASCAR Camping World Truck Series

2016 Speediactrics 200
Race details
- Race 8 of 23 of the 2016 NASCAR Camping World Truck Series
- Date: June 18, 2016
- Official name: 8th Annual Speediatrics 200
- Location: Iowa Speedway, Newton, Iowa
- Course: Permanent racing facility
- Course length: 0.875 miles (1.408 km)
- Distance: 200 laps, 175 mi (281 km)
- Scheduled distance: 200 laps, 175 mi (281 km)
- Average speed: 92.702 mph (149.189 km/h)

Pole position
Driver	John Hunter Nemechek	NEMCO Motorsports
- Time: 23.147

Most laps led
Driver	William Byron	Kyle Busch Motorsports
- Laps: 107

Winner
No. 9	William Byron	Kyle Busch Motorsports

Television in the United States
- Network: FS1
- Announcers: Vince Welch, Phil Parsons, and Michael Waltrip

Radio in the United States
- Radio: MRN

The 2016 Speediatrics 200 was the 8th stock car race of the 2016 NASCAR Camping World Truck Series, and the 8th iteration of the event. The race was held on Saturday, June 18, 2016, in Newton, Iowa, at Iowa Speedway, a 0.875-mile (1.408 km) permanent tri-oval shaped racetrack. The race took the scheduled 200 laps to complete. William Byron, driving for Kyle Busch Motorsports, made a late-race pass with 10 laps to go, and earned his third career NASCAR Camping World Truck Series win, and his second consecutive win. Byron dominated the majority of the race, leading 107 laps. To fill out the podium, Cole Custer, driving for JR Motorsports, and Cameron Hayley, driving for ThorSport Racing, would finish 2nd and 3rd, respectively.

== Background ==
Iowa Speedway is a 7/8-mile (1.4 km) paved oval motor racing track in Newton, Iowa, United States, approximately 30 mi (48 km) east of Des Moines. It has over 25,000 permanent seats as well as a unique multi-tiered RV viewing area along the backstretch. The premiere event of the track is the Hy-Vee IndyCar Race Weekend held yearly in July since its inaugural running in 2007.

=== Entry list ===
- (R) denotes rookie driver.
- (i) denotes driver who is ineligible for series driver points.

#	Driver	Team	Make	Sponsor
00	Cole Custer (R)	JR Motorsports	Chevrolet	Haas Automation
1	Jennifer Jo Cobb	Jennifer Jo Cobb Racing	Chevrolet	Driven2Honor.org
02	Derek Scott Jr.	Young's Motorsports	Chevrolet	CrossRoads Concrete, MPM
4	Christopher Bell (R)	Kyle Busch Motorsports	Toyota	Toyota
05	John Wes Townley	Athenian Motorsports	Chevrolet	Jive Communications, Zaxby's
07	Casey Smith	SS-Green Light Racing	Chevrolet	Niemco Inc.
8	John Hunter Nemechek	NEMCO Motorsports	Chevrolet	Fire Alarm Services
9	William Byron (R)	Kyle Busch Motorsports	Toyota	Liberty University
10	Claire Decker (i)	Jennifer Jo Cobb Racing	Chevrolet	Driven2Honor.org
11	Germán Quiroga	Red Horse Racing	Toyota	Red Horse Racing
13	Cameron Hayley	ThorSport Racing	Toyota	Cabinets by Hayley
17	Timothy Peters	Red Horse Racing	Toyota	Red Horse Racing
19	Daniel Hemric	Brad Keselowski Racing	Ford	Oakmont Management Group
21	Johnny Sauter	GMS Racing	Chevrolet	Allegiant Travel Company
22	Austin Wayne Self (R)	AM Racing	Toyota	AM Technical Solutions
23	Spencer Gallagher	GMS Racing	Chevrolet	Allegiant Travel Company
24	Kaz Grala	GMS Racing	Chevrolet	Allegiant Travel Company
29	Tyler Reddick	Brad Keselowski Racing	Ford	Cooper-Standard Automotive
33	Ben Kennedy	GMS Racing	Chevrolet	Wheelwell
41	Ben Rhodes (R)	ThorSport Racing	Toyota	Alpha Energy Solutions
44	Tommy Joe Martins	Martins Motorsports	Chevrolet	Diamond Gusset Jeans
49	Nick Drake	JR Motorsports	Chevrolet	Haas Automation
50	Travis Kvapil	MAKE Motorsports	Chevrolet	GasBuddy
51	Daniel Suárez (i)	Kyle Busch Motorsports	Toyota	Arris
63	Jake Griffin	MB Motorsports	Chevrolet	Vatterott College
66	Jordan Anderson	Bolen Motorsports	Chevrolet	Columbia SC - Famously Hot
71	Brandon Jones (i)	Ranier Racing with MDM	Chevrolet	Jeld-Wen, Menards
74	Donnie Levister	Faith Motorsports	Chevrolet	SMD
75	Caleb Holman	Henderson Motorsports	Chevrolet	Morning Fresh Farms, Food Country USA
86	Brandon Brown	Brandonbilt Motorsports	Chevrolet	Coastal Carolina University
88	Matt Crafton	ThorSport Racing	Toyota	Ideal Door, Menards
92	Parker Kligerman	RBR Enterprises	Ford	Technet Professional, Black's Tire Service
98	Rico Abreu (R)	ThorSport Racing	Toyota	Safelite, Curb Records
Official entry list

== Practice ==
=== First practice ===
The first practice session was held on Friday, June 17, at 2:00 pm CST, and would last for 1 hour and 25 minutes. Ben Rhodes, driving for ThorSport Racing, would set the fastest time in the session, with a lap of 23.240, and an average speed of 135.542 mph (218.134 km/h).

Pos.	#	Driver	Team	Make	Time	Speed
1	41	Ben Rhodes (R)	ThorSport Racing	Toyota	23.240	135.542
2	9	William Byron (R)	Kyle Busch Motorsports	Toyota	23.357	134.863
3	8	John Hunter Nemechek	NEMCO Motorsports	Chevrolet	23.538	133.826
Full first practice results

=== Final practice ===
The final practice session was held on Friday, June 17, at 5:00 pm CST, and would last for 55 minutes. Christopher Bell, driving for Kyle Busch Motorsports, would set the fastest time in the session, with a lap of 23.283, and an average speed of 135.292 mph (217.731 km/h).

Pos.	#	Driver	Team	Make	Time	Speed
1	4	Christopher Bell (R)	Kyle Busch Motorsports	Toyota	23.283	135.292
2	13	Cameron Hayley	ThorSport Racing	Toyota	23.327	135.037
3	33	Ben Kennedy	GMS Racing	Chevrolet	23.346	134.927
Full final practice results

== Qualifying ==
Qualifying was held on Saturday, June 18, at 3:45 pm CST. Since Iowa Speedway is under 1.5 miles (2.4 km) in length, the qualifying system a multi-car system that included three rounds. The first round was 15 minutes, where every driver would be able to set a lap within the 15 minutes. Then, the second round would consist of the fastest 24 cars in Round 1, and drivers would have 10 minutes to set a lap. Round 3 consisted of the fastest 12 drivers from Round 2, and the drivers would have 5 minutes to set a time. Whoever was fastest in Round 3 would win the pole.

John Hunter Nemechek, driving for his family team, NEMCO Motorsports, would score the pole for the race, with a lap of 23.147, and an average speed of 136.087 mph (219.011 km/h) in the second round.

Donnie Levister would fail to qualify.

=== Full qualifying results ===
Pos.	#	Driver	Team	Make	Time (R1)	Speed (R1)	Time (R2)	Speed (R2)	Time (R3)	Speed (R3)
1	8	John Hunter Nemechek	NEMCO Motorsports	Chevrolet	23.304	135.170	23.233	135.583	23.147	136.087
2	13	Cameron Hayley	ThorSport Racing	Toyota	23.253	135.466	23.145	136.099	23.207	135.735
3	33	Ben Kennedy	GMS Racing	Chevrolet	23.232	135.589	23.049	136.665	23.243	135.525
4	24	Kaz Grala	GMS Racing	Chevrolet	23.277	135.327	23.221	135.653	23.259	135.431
5	9	William Byron (R)	Kyle Busch Motorsports	Toyota	22.926	137.399	23.166	135.975	23.261	135.420
6	71	Brandon Jones (i)	Ranier Racing with MDM	Chevrolet	23.476	134.180	23.236	135.566	23.277	135.327
7	21	Johnny Sauter	GMS Racing	Chevrolet	23.278	135.321	23.258	135.437	23.322	135.066
8	49	Nick Drake	JR Motorsports	Chevrolet	23.489	134.105	23.192	135.823	23.324	135.054
9	88	Matt Crafton	ThorSport Racing	Toyota	23.172	135.940	23.267	135.385	23.358	134.857
10	41	Ben Rhodes (R)	ThorSport Racing	Toyota	23.271	135.362	23.095	136.393	23.372	134.777
11	00	Cole Custer (R)	JR Motorsports	Chevrolet	23.205	135.747	23.291	135.245	23.421	134.495
12	75	Caleb Holman	Henderson Motorsports	Chevrolet	23.405	134.587	23.292	135.240	23.448	134.340
Eliminated in Round 2
13	4	Christopher Bell (R)	Kyle Busch Motorsports	Toyota	23.230	135.601	23.315	135.106	-	-
14	98	Rico Abreu (R)	ThorSport Racing	Toyota	23.480	134.157	23.334	134.996	-	-
15	29	Tyler Reddick	Brad Keselowski Racing	Ford	23.136	136.151	23.339	134.967	-	-
16	23	Spencer Gallagher	GMS Racing	Chevrolet	23.257	135.443	23.340	134.961	-	-
17	51	Daniel Suárez (i)	Kyle Busch Motorsports	Toyota	23.327	135.037	23.355	134.875	-	-
18	19	Daniel Hemric	Brad Keselowski Racing	Ford	23.482	134.145	23.373	134.771	-	-
19	17	Timothy Peters	Red Horse Racing	Toyota	23.389	134.679	23.528	133.883	-	-
20	05	John Wes Townley	Athenian Motorsports	Chevrolet	23.520	133.929	23.571	133.639	-	-
21	92	Parker Kligerman	RBR Enterprises	Ford	23.458	134.283	23.599	133.480	-	-
22	22	Austin Wayne Self (R)	AM Racing	Toyota	23.513	133.968	23.679	133.029	-	-
23	63	Jake Griffin	MB Motorsports	Chevrolet	23.525	133.900	23.731	132.738	-	-
24	86	Brandon Brown	Brandonbilt Motorsports	Chevrolet	23.552	133.747	24.002	131.239	-	-
Eliminated in Round 1
25	11	Germán Quiroga	Red Horse Racing	Toyota	23.590	133.531	-	-	-	-
26	66	Jordan Anderson	Bolen Motorsports	Chevrolet	23.799	132.359	-	-	-	-
27	02	Derek Scott Jr.	Young's Motorsports	Chevrolet	23.965	131.442	-	-	-	-
Qualified by owner's points
28	50	Travis Kvapil	MAKE Motorsports	Chevrolet	24.009	131.201	-	-	-	-
29	07	Casey Smith	SS-Green Light Racing	Chevrolet	24.055	130.950	-	-	-	-
30	44	Tommy Joe Martins	Martins Motorsports	Chevrolet	24.169	130.332	-	-	-	-
31	1	Jennifer Jo Cobb	Jennifer Jo Cobb Racing	Chevrolet	25.204	124.980	-	-	-	-
32	10	Claire Decker (i)	Jennifer Jo Cobb Racing	Chevrolet	26.293	119.804	-	-	-	-
Failed to qualify
33	74	Donnie Levister	Faith Motorsports	Chevrolet	24.551	128.304	-	-	-	-
Official qualifying results
Official starting lineup

== Race results ==
Fin	St	#	Driver	Team	Make	Laps	Led	Status	Pts
1	5	9	William Byron (R)	Kyle Busch Motorsports	Toyota	200	107	Running	37
2	11	00	Cole Custer (R)	JR Motorsports	Chevrolet	200	3	Running	32
3	2	13	Cameron Hayley	ThorSport Racing	Toyota	200	0	Running	30
4	10	41	Ben Rhodes (R)	ThorSport Racing	Toyota	200	0	Running	29
5	15	29	Tyler Reddick	Brad Keselowski Racing	Ford	200	37	Running	29
6	17	51	Daniel Suárez (i)	Kyle Busch Motorsports	Toyota	200	0	Running	0
7	3	33	Ben Kennedy	GMS Racing	Chevrolet	200	0	Running	26
8	9	88	Matt Crafton	ThorSport Racing	Toyota	200	0	Running	25
9	13	4	Christopher Bell (R)	Kyle Busch Motorsports	Toyota	200	0	Running	24
10	7	21	Johnny Sauter	GMS Racing	Chevrolet	200	0	Running	23
11	19	17	Timothy Peters	Red Horse Racing	Toyota	200	0	Running	22
12	1	8	John Hunter Nemechek	NEMCO Motorsports	Chevrolet	200	53	Running	21
13	16	23	Spencer Gallagher	GMS Racing	Chevrolet	200	0	Running	20
14	25	11	Germán Quiroga	Red Horse Racing	Toyota	200	0	Running	19
15	18	19	Daniel Hemric	Brad Keselowski Racing	Ford	200	0	Running	18
16	22	22	Austin Wayne Self (R)	AM Racing	Toyota	200	0	Running	17
17	6	71	Brandon Jones (i)	Ranier Racing with MDM	Chevrolet	200	0	Running	0
18	14	98	Rico Abreu (R)	ThorSport Racing	Toyota	200	0	Running	15
19	20	05	John Wes Townley	Athenian Motorsports	Chevrolet	200	0	Running	14
20	26	66	Jordan Anderson	Bolen Motorsports	Chevrolet	200	0	Running	13
21	23	63	Jake Griffin	MB Motorsports	Chevrolet	199	0	Running	12
22	29	07	Casey Smith	SS-Green Light Racing	Chevrolet	198	0	Running	11
23	8	49	Nick Drake	JR Motorsports	Chevrolet	197	0	Running	10
24	24	86	Brandon Brown	Brandonbilt Motorsports	Chevrolet	197	0	Running	9
25	27	02	Derek Scott Jr.	Young's Motorsports	Chevrolet	196	0	Running	8
26	12	75	Caleb Holman	Henderson Motorsports	Chevrolet	192	0	Accident	7
27	28	50	Travis Kvapil	MAKE Motorsports	Chevrolet	191	0	Running	6
28	31	1	Jennifer Jo Cobb	Jennifer Jo Cobb Racing	Chevrolet	191	0	Running	5
29	4	24	Kaz Grala	GMS Racing	Chevrolet	189	0	Running	4
30	30	44	Tommy Joe Martins	Martins Motorsports	Chevrolet	173	0	Accident	3
31	21	92	Parker Kligerman	RBR Enterprises	Ford	41	0	Accident	2
32	32	10	Claire Decker (i)	Jennifer Jo Cobb Racing	Chevrolet	5	0	Fuel Pump	0
Official race results

== Standings after the race ==
Drivers' Championship standings

	Pos	Driver	Points
	1	Matt Crafton	219
1	2	William Byron	208 (−11)
1	3	Timothy Peters	198 (−21)
	4	Daniel Hemric	186 (−33)
1	5	Tyler Reddick	182 (−37)
1	6	John Hunter Nemechek	175 (−44)
	7	Johnny Sauter	174 (−45)
1	8	Ben Kennedy	168 (−51)
Official driver's standings

- Note: Only the first 8 positions are included for the driver standings.

Previous race: 2016 Rattlesnake 400	NASCAR Camping World Truck Series; 2016 season	Next race: 2016 Drivin' for Linemen 200
