= 2016 Jacob Companies 200 =

5th race of the 2016 NASCAR Camping World Truck Series

Race details
- Race 5 of 23 of the 2016 NASCAR Camping World Truck Series
- Date: May 13, 2016
- Official name: 17th Annual Jacob Companies 200
- Location: Dover International Speedway, Dover, Delaware
- Course: Permanent racing facility
- Course length: 1 miles (1.6 km)
- Distance: 200 laps, 200 mi (321 km)
- Scheduled distance: 200 laps, 200 mi (321 km)
- Average speed: 111.369 miles per hour (179.231 km/h)

Pole position
Driver	William Byron	Kyle Busch Motorsports
- Grid positions set by competition-based formula

Most laps led
Driver	William Byron	Kyle Busch Motorsports
- Laps: 80

Winner
No. 88	Matt Crafton	ThorSport Racing

Television in the United States
- Network: FS1
- Announcers: Vince Welch, Phil Parsons, and Michael Waltrip

Radio in the United States
- Radio: MRN

The 2016 Jacob Companies 200 was the 5th stock car race of the 2016 NASCAR Camping World Truck Series, and the 17th iteration of the event. The race was held on Friday, May 13, 2016, in Dover, Delaware at Dover International Speedway, a 1-mile (1.6 km) permanent oval-shaped racetrack. The race took the scheduled 200 laps to complete. Matt Crafton, driving for ThorSport Racing, held off Daniel Suárez in the final 28 laps for his 12th career NASCAR Camping World Truck Series win, and his first of the season. To fill out the podium, Christopher Bell, driving for Kyle Busch Motorsports, would finish in 3rd, respectively.

== Background ==
The layout of Dover International Speedway, the venue where the race was held.

Dover International Speedway is a race track in Dover, Delaware. The track has hosted at least one NASCAR Cup Series race each year since 1969, including two per year from 1971 to 2020. In addition to NASCAR, the track also hosted USAC and the Indy Racing League. The track features one layout, a 1 mile (1.6 km) concrete oval, with 24° banking in the turns and 9° banking on the straights. The speedway is owned and operated by Speedway Motorsports.

The track, nicknamed "The Monster Mile", was built in 1969 by Melvin Joseph of Melvin L. Joseph Construction Company, Inc., with an asphalt surface, but was replaced with concrete in 1995. Six years later in 2001, the track's capacity increased to 135,000 seats, giving the track the largest seating capacity of any sports venue in the mid-Atlantic region. In 2002, the name changed to Dover International Speedway from Dover Downs International Speedway after Dover Downs Gaming and Entertainment split, making Dover Motorsports. From 2007 to 2009, the speedway worked on an improvement project called "The Monster Makeover", which expanded facilities at the track and beautified the track. Depending on configuration, the track's capacity is at 95,500 seats. Its grand total maximum capacity was at 135,000 spectators.

=== Entry list ===
- (R) denotes rookie driver.
- (i) denotes driver who is ineligible for series driver points.

#	Driver	Team	Make	Sponsor
00	Cole Custer (R)	JR Motorsports	Chevrolet	Haas Automation
1	Austin Hill	Austin Hill Racing	Ford	A&D Welding
02	Tyler Young	Young's Motorsports	Chevrolet	Randco, Young's Building Systems
2	Austin Cindric	Brad Keselowski Racing	Ford	Pirtek
4	Christopher Bell (R)	Kyle Busch Motorsports	Toyota	Toyota
05	John Wes Townley	Athenian Motorsports	Chevrolet	Zaxby's
6	Norm Benning	Norm Benning Racing	Chevrolet	Norm Benning Racing
07	C. J. Faison	SS-Green Light Racing	Chevrolet	SS-Green Light Racing
8	John Hunter Nemechek	NEMCO Motorsports	Chevrolet	Cricket SX3
9	William Byron (R)	Kyle Busch Motorsports	Toyota	Liberty University
10	Jennifer Jo Cobb	Jennifer Jo Cobb Racing	Chevrolet	Driven2Honor.org, Applebee's
11	Matt Tifft (R)	Red Horse Racing	Toyota	Autism Delaware
13	Cameron Hayley	ThorSport Racing	Toyota	Cabinets by Hayley
17	Timothy Peters	Red Horse Racing	Toyota	Red Horse Racing
19	Daniel Hemric	Brad Keselowski Racing	Ford	Oakwood Management Group
21	Johnny Sauter	GMS Racing	Chevrolet	Allegiant Travel Company
22	Austin Wayne Self (R)	AM Racing	Toyota	AM Technical Solutions
23	Spencer Gallagher	GMS Racing	Chevrolet	Allegiant Travel Company
24	Ben Kennedy	GMS Racing	Chevrolet	Jacob Companies
29	Tyler Reddick	Brad Keselowski Racing	Ford	Cooper-Standard Automotive
33	Kaz Grala	GMS Racing	Chevrolet	Allegiant Travel Company
41	Ben Rhodes (R)	ThorSport Racing	Toyota	Alpha Energy Solutions
44	Tommy Joe Martins	Martins Motorsports	Chevrolet	Diamond Gusset Jeans
49	Nick Drake	JR Motorsports	Chevrolet	Haas Automation
50	Travis Kvapil	MAKE Motorsports	Chevrolet	GasBuddy
51	Daniel Suárez (i)	Kyle Busch Motorsports	Toyota	Arris
63	Bobby Pierce	MB Motorsports	Chevrolet	MB Motorsports
66	Jordan Anderson	Bolen Motorsports	Chevrolet	Columbia SC – Famously Hot
71	Brandon Jones (i)	Ranier Racing with MDM	Chevrolet	AAA Car Care Centers
81	Ryan Truex	Hattori Racing Enterprises	Toyota	SeaWatch International
86	Brandon Brown	Brandonbilt Motorsports	Chevrolet	Coastal Carolina University
88	Matt Crafton	ThorSport Racing	Toyota	Chi-Chi's, Menards
92	Parker Kligerman	RBR Enterprises	Ford	Black's Tire Service, Advance Auto Parts
98	Rico Abreu (R)	ThorSport Racing	Toyota	Safelite, Curb Records
Official entry list

== Practice ==
=== First practice ===
The first practice session was held on Thursday, May 12, at 2:00 pm EST, and would last for 55 minutes. William Byron, driving for Kyle Busch Motorsports, would set the fastest time in the session, with a lap of 22.581, and an average speed of 159.426 mph (256.571 km/h).

Pos.	#	Driver	Team	Make	Time	Speed
1	9	William Byron (R)	Kyle Busch Motorsports	Toyota	22.581	159.426
2	71	Brandon Jones (i)	Ranier Racing with MDM	Chevrolet	22.685	158.695
3	11	Matt Tifft (R)	Red Horse Racing	Toyota	22.724	158.423
Full first practice results

=== Final practice ===
The final practice session was held on Thursday, May 12, at 4:00 pm EST, and would last for 55 minutes. Cole Custer, driving for JR Motorsports, would set the fastest time in the session, with a lap of 22.846, and an average speed of 157.577 mph (253.596 km/h).

Pos.	#	Driver	Team	Make	Time	Speed
1	00	Cole Custer (R)	JR Motorsports	Chevrolet	22.846	157.577
2	4	Christopher Bell (R)	Kyle Busch Motorsports	Toyota	22.875	157.377
3	24	Ben Kennedy	GMS Racing	Chevrolet	22.962	156.781
Full final practice results

== Qualifying ==
Qualifying was originally going to be held on Friday, May 13, at 2:15 pm EST. Since Dover International Speedway is under 1.5 miles (2.4 km) in length, the qualifying system was a multi-car system that included three rounds. The first round was 15 minutes, where every driver would be able to set a lap within the 15 minutes. Then, the second round would consist of the fastest 24 cars in Round 1, and drivers would have 10 minutes to set a lap. Round 3 consisted of the fastest 12 drivers from Round 2, and the drivers would have 5 minutes to set a time. Whoever was fastest in Round 3 would win the pole.

Qualifying would be cancelled due to inclement weather. The starting lineup would be determined by speeds in first practice. As a result, William Byron, driving for Kyle Busch Motorsports would earn the pole.

Austin Cindric and Norm Benning would fail to qualify.

=== Starting lineup ===
Pos.	#	Driver	Team	Make
1	9	William Byron (R)	Kyle Busch Motorsports	Toyota
2	71	Brandon Jones (i)	Ranier Racing with MDM	Chevrolet
3	11	Matt Tifft (R)	Red Horse Racing	Toyota
4	13	Cameron Hayley	ThorSport Racing	Toyota
5	88	Matt Crafton	ThorSport Racing	Toyota
6	51	Daniel Suárez (i)	Kyle Busch Motorsports	Toyota
7	00	Cole Custer (R)	JR Motorsports	Chevrolet
8	19	Daniel Hemric	Brad Keselowski Racing	Ford
9	4	Christopher Bell (R)	Kyle Busch Motorsports	Toyota
10	41	Ben Rhodes (R)	ThorSport Racing	Toyota
11	24	Ben Kennedy	GMS Racing	Chevrolet
12	92	Parker Kligerman	RBR Enterprises	Ford
13	98	Rico Abreu (R)	ThorSport Racing	Toyota
14	49	Nick Drake	JR Motorsports	Chevrolet
15	21	Johnny Sauter	GMS Racing	Chevrolet
16	29	Tyler Reddick	Brad Keselowski Racing	Ford
17	17	Timothy Peters	Red Horse Racing	Toyota
18	81	Ryan Truex	Hattori Racing Enterprises	Toyota
19	8	John Hunter Nemechek	NEMCO Motorsports	Chevrolet
20	05	John Wes Townley	Athenian Motorsports	Chevrolet
21	23	Spencer Gallagher	GMS Racing	Chevrolet
22	33	Kaz Grala	GMS Racing	Chevrolet
23	86	Brandon Brown	Brandonbilt Motorsports	Chevrolet
24	66	Jordan Anderson	Bolen Motorsports	Chevrolet
25	22	Austin Wayne Self (R)	AM Racing	Toyota
26	1	Austin Hill	Austin Hill Racing	Ford
27	02	Tyler Young	Young's Motorsports	Chevrolet
Qualified by owner's points
28	63	Bobby Pierce	MB Motorsports	Chevrolet
29	44	Tommy Joe Martins	Martins Motorsports	Chevrolet
30	50	Travis Kvapil	MAKE Motorsports	Chevrolet
31	07	C. J. Faison	SS-Green Light Racing	Chevrolet
32	10	Jennifer Jo Cobb	Jennifer Jo Cobb Racing	Chevrolet
Failed to qualify
33	2	Austin Cindric	Brad Keselowski Racing	Ford
34	6	Norm Benning	Norm Benning Racing	Chevrolet
Official starting lineup

== Race results ==
Fin	St	#	Driver	Team	Make	Laps	Led	Status	Pts
1	5	88	Matt Crafton	ThorSport Racing	Toyota	200	76	Running	36
2	6	51	Daniel Suárez (i)	Kyle Busch Motorsports	Toyota	200	0	Running	0
3	9	4	Christopher Bell (R)	Kyle Busch Motorsports	Toyota	200	0	Running	30
4	15	21	Johnny Sauter	GMS Racing	Chevrolet	200	0	Running	29
5	7	00	Cole Custer (R)	JR Motorsports	Chevrolet	200	0	Running	28
6	21	23	Spencer Gallagher	GMS Racing	Chevrolet	200	0	Running	27
7	16	29	Tyler Reddick	Brad Keselowski Racing	Ford	200	39	Running	27
8	18	81	Ryan Truex	Hattori Racing Enterprises	Toyota	200	0	Running	25
9	8	19	Daniel Hemric	Brad Keselowski Racing	Ford	200	0	Running	24
10	22	33	Kaz Grala	GMS Racing	Chevrolet	200	0	Running	23
11	1	9	William Byron (R)	Kyle Busch Motorsports	Toyota	200	80	Running	24
12	3	11	Matt Tifft (R)	Red Horse Racing	Toyota	200	0	Running	21
13	11	24	Ben Kennedy	GMS Racing	Chevrolet	200	0	Running	20
14	17	17	Timothy Peters	Red Horse Racing	Toyota	200	0	Running	19
15	19	8	John Hunter Nemechek	NEMCO Motorsports	Chevrolet	200	0	Running	18
16	14	49	Nick Drake	JR Motorsports	Chevrolet	200	0	Running	17
17	26	1	Austin Hill	Austin Hill Racing	Ford	198	0	Running	16
18	24	66	Jordan Anderson	Bolen Motorsports	Chevrolet	198	0	Running	15
19	4	13	Cameron Hayley	ThorSport Racing	Toyota	197	0	Running	14
20	2	71	Brandon Jones (i)	Ranier Racing with MDM	Chevrolet	196	0	Running	0
21	27	02	Tyler Young	Young's Motorsports	Chevrolet	196	0	Running	12
22	13	98	Rico Abreu (R)	ThorSport Racing	Toyota	196	0	Running	11
23	30	50	Travis Kvapil	MAKE Motorsports	Chevrolet	195	0	Running	10
24	29	44	Tommy Joe Martins	Martins Motorsports	Chevrolet	194	0	Running	9
25	31	07	C. J. Faison	SS-Green Light Racing	Chevrolet	190	0	Running	8
26	28	63	Bobby Pierce	MB Motorsports	Chevrolet	176	0	Accident	7
27	12	92	Parker Kligerman	RBR Enterprises	Ford	136	0	Rear Gear	6
28	10	41	Ben Rhodes (R)	ThorSport Racing	Toyota	131	0	Running	5
29	20	05	John Wes Townley	Athenian Motorsports	Chevrolet	128	3	Accident	5
30	32	10	Jennifer Jo Cobb	Jennifer Jo Cobb Racing	Chevrolet	65	0	Brakes	3
31	23	86	Brandon Brown	Brandonbilt Motorsports	Chevrolet	56	0	Suspension	2
32	25	22	Austin Wayne Self (R)	AM Racing	Toyota	41	0	Engine	1
Official race results

== Standings after the race ==
Drivers' Championship standings

	Pos	Driver	Points
5	1	Matt Crafton	124
1	2	Timothy Peters	122 (−2)
1	3	Daniel Hemric	119 (−5)
1	4	Ryan Truex	118 (−6)
3	5	Spencer Gallagher	112 (−12)
1	6	William Byron	111 (−13)
2	7	John Hunter Nemechek	106 (−18)
4	8	Tyler Young	101 (−23)
Official driver's standings

- Note: Only the first 8 positions are included for the driver standings.

Previous race: 2016 Toyota Tundra 250	NASCAR Camping World Truck Series; 2016 season	Next race: 2016 North Carolina Education Lottery 200
