= Casey Smith =

American racing driver

- Born: April 20, 1985 (age 41); Austin, Texas, U.S.
- Achievements: 2015 Southern Super Series Champion; 2007, 2008 Viper Pro Late Model Series Champion; 2015 Rumble by the River 100 Winner

NASCAR FedEx Freight Truck Series career
- 2 races run over 1 year
- 2016 position: 55th
- Best finish: 55th (2016)
- First race: 2016 Speediatrics 200 (Iowa)
- Last race: 2016 Striping Technology 350 (Texas)
Wins	Top tens	Poles
0	0	0

Casey Smith (born April 20, 1985) is an American professional stock car racing driver. He last competed part-time in the NASCAR Camping World Truck Series, driving the No. 45 for Niece Motorsports.

== Racing career ==
Smith made his NASCAR debut in 2016, driving the No. 07 Chevrolet Silverado for SS-Green Light Racing at Iowa and he finished 22nd. He returned later that season at Martinsville behind the wheel of the No. 45 Chevrolet Silverado for newly created Niece Motorsports but he failed to qualify. Then Smith and Niece returned for the following week's race at Texas and finished 23rd.

== Motorsports career results ==
=== NASCAR ===
(key) (Bold – Pole position awarded by qualifying time. Italics – Pole position earned by points standings or practice time. * – Most laps led.)

==== Camping World Truck Series ====
NASCAR Camping World Truck Series results
Year	Team	No.	Make	1	2	3	4	5	6	7	8	9	10	11	12	13	14	15	16	17	18	19	20	21	22	23	NCWTC	Pts	Ref
2016	SS-Green Light Racing	07	Chevy	DAY	ATL	MAR	KAN	DOV	CLT	TEX	IOW; 22	GTW	KEN	ELD	POC	BRI	MCH	MSP	CHI	NHA	LVS	TAL					55th	21	
2016	Niece Motorsports	45	Chevy																				MAR; DNQ	TEX; 23	PHO	HOM	55th	21	
