= Derek Scott Jr. =

American racing driver

- Born: April 22, 1999 (age 27); Franklin, Texas, U.S.

NASCAR FedEx Freight Truck Series career
- 1 race run over 1 year
- 2016 position: 68th
- Best finish: 68th (2016)
- First race: 2016 Speediatrics 200 (Iowa)
Wins	Top tens	Poles
0	0	0

Derek Scott Jr. (born April 22, 1999) is an American professional stock car racing driver. He last competed part-time in the NASCAR Camping World Truck Series, driving the No. 02 for Young's Motorsports.

Scott started in kart racing when he was eight years old, and at the age of fourteen, he moved up to late models. In 2016, he made his Truck Series debut at Iowa Speedway.

== Motorsports career results ==
=== NASCAR ===
(key) (Bold – Pole position awarded by qualifying time. Italics – Pole position earned by points standings or practice time. * – Most laps led.)

==== Camping World Truck Series ====
NASCAR Camping World Truck Series results
Year	Team	No.	Make	1	2	3	4	5	6	7	8	9	10	11	12	13	14	15	16	17	18	19	20	21	22	23	NCWTC	Pts	Ref
2016	Young's Motorsports	02	Chevy	DAY	ATL	MAR	KAN	DOV	CLT	TEX	IOW; 25	GTW	KEN	ELD	POC	BRI	MCH	MSP	CHI	NHA	LVS	TAL	MAR	TEX	PHO	HOM	68th	8	
