= Nick Drake (racing driver) =

American racing driver (born 1995)

- Born: December 22, 1995 (age 30); Mooresville, North Carolina, U.S.

NASCAR FedEx Freight Truck Series career
- 2 races run over 1 year
- 2016 position: 44th
- Best finish: 44th (2016)
- First race: 2016 Jacob Companies 200 (Dover)
- Last race: 2016 Speediatrics 200 (Iowa)
Wins	Top tens	Poles
0	0	0
- Statistics up to date as of June 18, 2016.

Nicholas Drake (born December 22, 1995) is an American former professional stock car racing driver. He has competed in the NASCAR Camping World Truck Series and K&N Pro Series East as a development driver for JR Motorsports.

== Racing career ==
=== K&N Pro Series West ===
Drake ran two races in the K&N Pro Series West in 2014 with Bill McAnally Racing, both at Phoenix International Raceway. After finishing third his first time around, he started from the pole and won in his second race.

=== Camping World Truck Series ===
Drake, a former Haas Racing development driver, debuted in 2016, driving JR Motorsports' No. 49 entry at Dover International Speedway. He qualified fourteenth and finished on the lead lap in sixteenth. Three races later at Iowa Speedway, Drake qualified in the top-ten but fell to a twenty-third-place finish, three laps off the pace. His teammate for those two races was Cole Custer, who Drake had raced with in the K&N Pro Series East.

== Motorsports career results ==
=== NASCAR ===
(key) (Bold – Pole position awarded by qualifying time. Italics – Pole position earned by points standings or practice time. * – Most laps led. ** – All laps led.)

==== Camping World Truck Series ====
NASCAR Camping World Truck Series results
Year	Team	No.	Make	1	2	3	4	5	6	7	8	9	10	11	12	13	14	15	16	17	18	19	20	21	22	23	NCWTC	Pts	Ref
2016	JR Motorsports	49	Chevy	DAY	ATL	MAR	KAN	DOV; 16	CLT	TEX	IOW; 23	GTW	KEN	ELD	POC	BRI	MCH	MSP	CHI	NHA	LVS	TAL	MAR	TEX	PHO	HOM	44th	27	

==== K&N Pro Series East ====
NASCAR K&N Pro Series East results
Year	Team	No.	Make	1	2	3	4	5	6	7	8	9	10	11	12	13	14	15	16	NKNPSEC	Pts	Ref
2014	Bill McAnally Racing	15	Toyota	NSM; 15	DAY; 4	BRI; 29	GRE; 16	**RCH**; 3	IOW; 2	BGS; 10	FIF; 14	LGY; 7	NHA; 24	COL; 7	IOW; 13	GLN; 10	VIR; 12	GRE; 5	DOV; 28	10th	507	
2015	Bill McAnally Racing	15	Toyota	NSM; 8	GRE; 7	BRI; 13	IOW; 11	BGS; 10	LGY; 8	COL; 11	NHA; 4	IOW; 16	GLN; 11	MOT; 14	VIR; 7	RCH; 28	DOV; 5			8th	463	

==== K&N Pro Series West ====
NASCAR K&N Pro Series West results
Year	Team	No.	Make	1	2	3	4	5	6	7	8	9	10	11	12	13	14	NKNPSWC	Pts	Ref
2014	Bill McAnally Racing	55	Toyota	PHO; 3	IRW	S99	IOW	KCR	SON	SLS	CNS	IOW	EVG	KCR	MMP	AAS		28th	89	
2014	Bill McAnally Racing	99	Toyota														**PHO**; 1**	28th	89	

^{*} Season still in progress
^{1} Ineligible for series points
