= Ben Kennedy (NASCAR) =

American racing driver and businessman (born 1991)

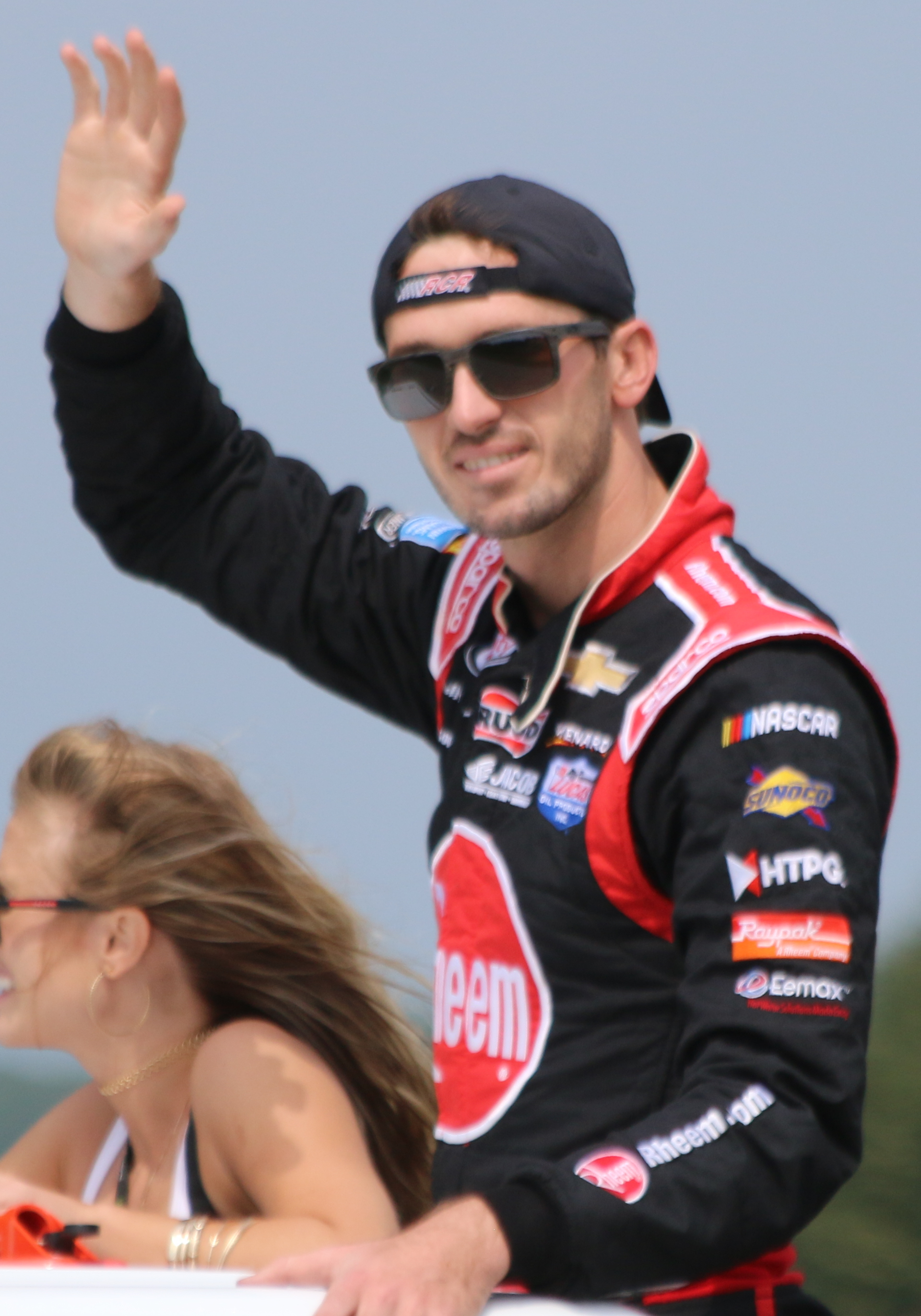
- Kennedy at Road America in 2017

COO of NASCAR
- Incumbent
- Assumed office April 24, 2026

Executive Vice President NASCAR Chief Venue & Racing Innovations Officer
- In office March 10, 2022 – April 24, 2026

Personal details
- Born: December 26, 1991 (age 34) Daytona Beach, Florida, U.S.
- Parents: Dr. Bruce Kennedy (father); Lesa Kennedy (mother)
- Relatives: Bill France Sr. (great grandfather); Bill France Jr. (grandfather); Jim France (great uncle); Brian France (uncle)
- Education: University of Florida (BA)
- Occupation: NASCAR executive; Auto racing driver; ARCA Menards Series East team owner

NASCAR O'Reilly Auto Parts Series career
- 17 races run over 2 years
- 2017 position: 23rd
- Best finish: 23rd (2017)
- First race: 2016 American Ethanol E15 250 (Iowa)
- Last race: 2017 Ford EcoBoost 300 (Homestead)
Wins	Top tens	Poles
0	3	0

NASCAR FedEx Freight Truck Series career
- 73 races run over 4 years
- 2016 position: 7th
- Best finish: 7th (2016)
- First race: 2013 UNOH 200 (Bristol)
- Last race: 2016 Ford EcoBoost 200 (Homestead)
- First win: 2016 UNOH 200 (Bristol)
Wins	Top tens	Poles
1	26	1

Previous series
- 2012 2011–2012, 2015 2010–2013, 2017: Racecar Euro Series; NASCAR K&N Pro Series West; NASCAR K&N Pro Series East

Awards
- 2014: NASCAR Camping World Truck Series Rookie of the Year
- Statistics up to date as of April 24, 2026.

Benjamin Kennedy (born December 26, 1991) is an American motorsports executive and former stock car racing driver. He is as the chief operating officer for NASCAR.

== Executive career ==
=== General manager of Truck Series ===
On January 30, 2018, Kennedy was appointed as the general manager of the Camping World Truck Series. After one season in the role, he transitioned to a position focused on strategic initiatives.

=== NASCAR front office ===
In January 2019, Kennedy joined NASCAR's racing operations team, focusing on the sport's international development. A year later, he was promoted to Vice President of Racing Development. In July 2020, he advanced to Vice President of Strategic Initiatives, overseeing racing development for NASCAR's three national series. By June 2021, he was named Senior Vice President of Strategy and Innovation, reporting directly to NASCAR President Steve Phelps.

Kennedy is responsible for developing the schedules for the sport's top three series. In this role, he played a key part in introducing the Busch Light Clash at The Coliseum, a pre-season exhibition race held at the Los Angeles Memorial Coliseum. NASCAR refers to him as the "point man" for scheduling.

On March 10, 2022, NASCAR announced the promotion of Kennedy to Senior Vice President of Racing Development and Strategy.

On July 17, 2024, NASCAR further elevated Kennedy to the role of Executive Vice President and Chief Venue & Racing Innovations Officer as part of a major company restructuring.

He was promoted to Chief Operating Officer on April 25, 2026.

== Racing career ==
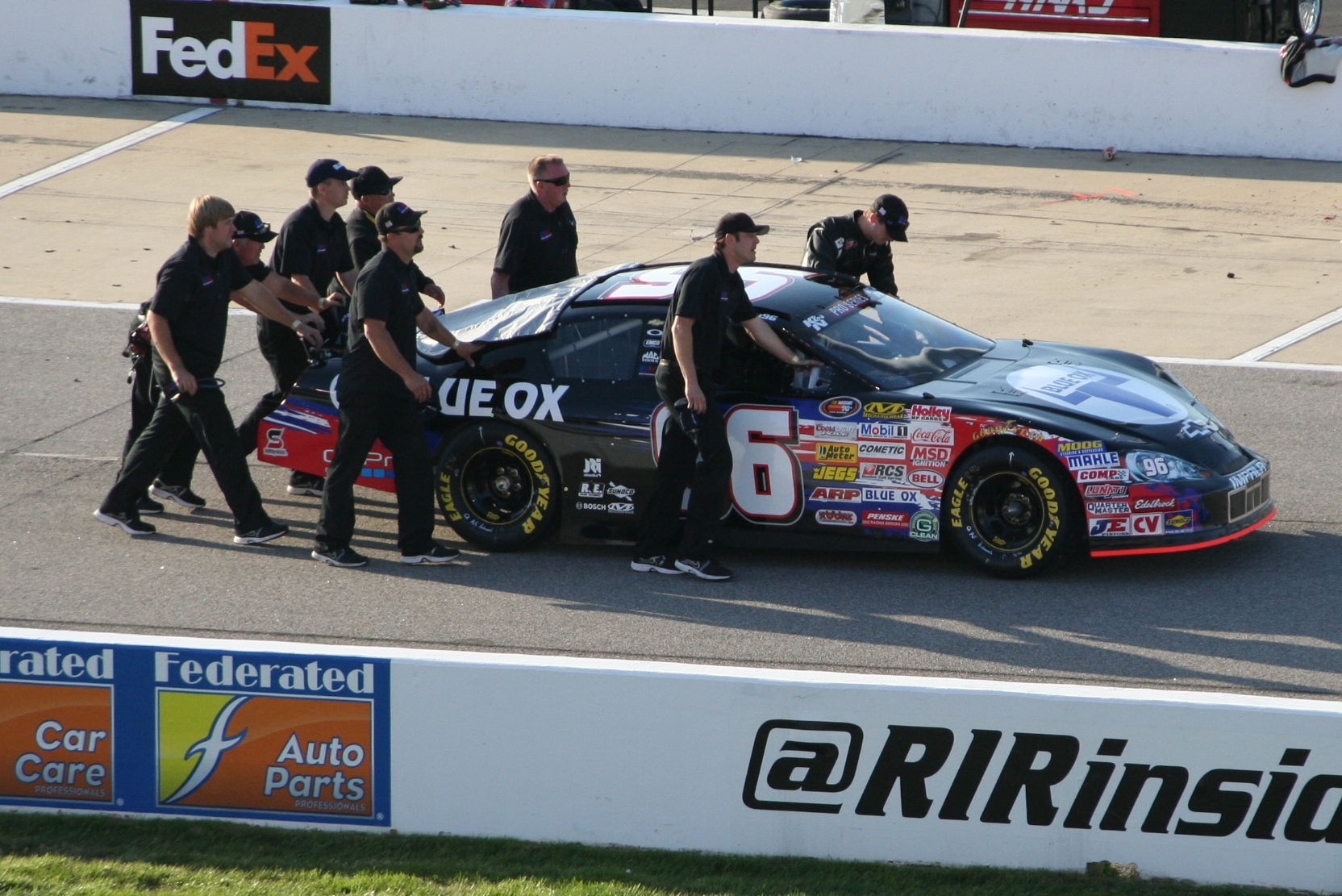
Kennedy's 2013 K&N East car

Kennedy launched his racing career on the short tracks of central Florida, earning championships in Super Late Models at Orlando Speedworld and in Pro Truck racing at both Orlando Speedworld and New Smyrna Speedway. He made his touring series debut in the K&N Pro Series East in 2010 and competed full-time in the series starting in 2011.

In 2012, Kennedy competed in the full K&N Pro Series East schedule and participated in the inaugural Euro Racecar Series event under NASCAR sanction. He won the race at Tours Speedway, marking the first NASCAR event held on an oval in Europe.

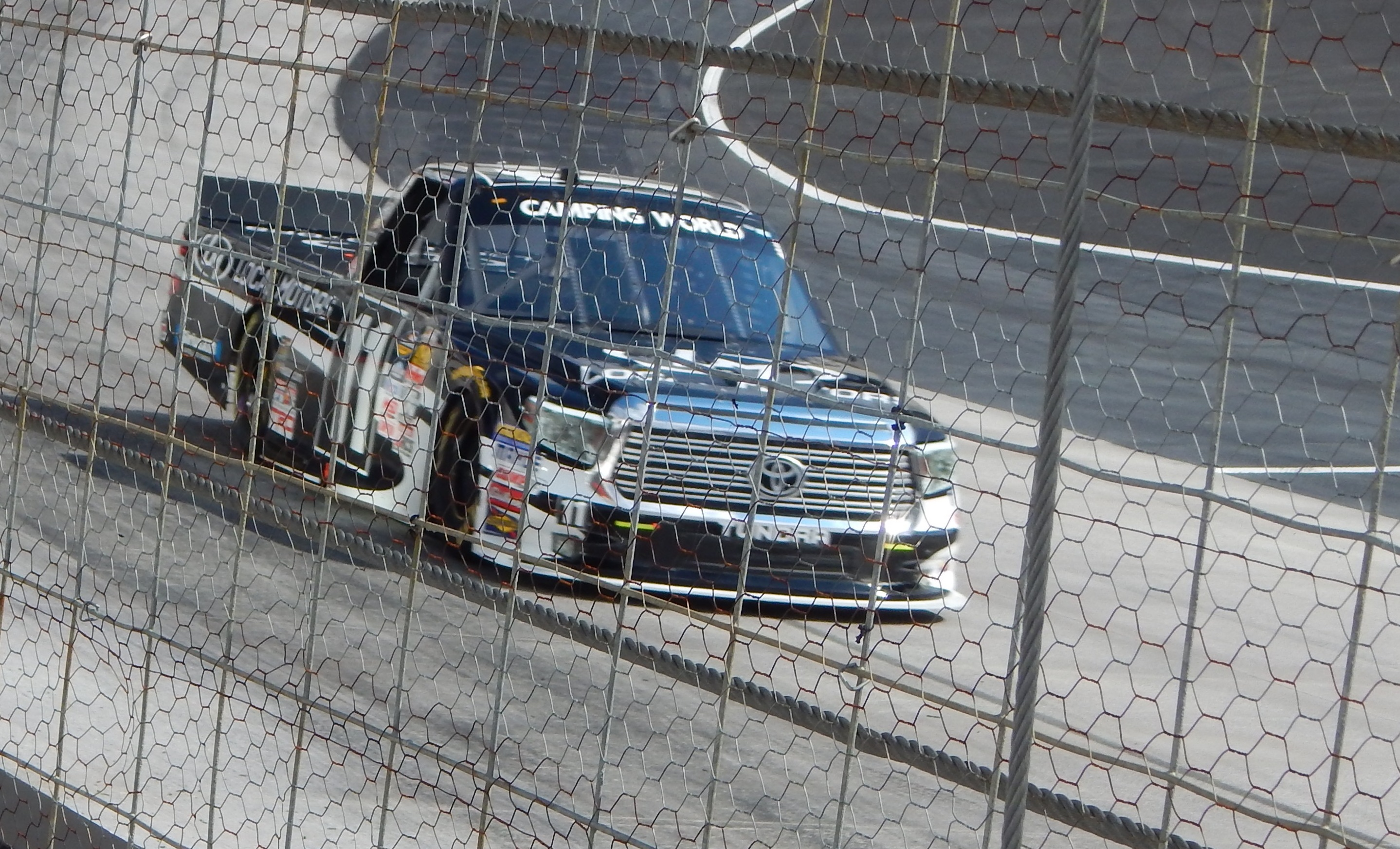
Kennedy at Bristol Motor Speedway in 2015

After finishing ninth in series points in 2012, Kennedy was highlighted by Fox Sports in January 2013 as one of NASCAR's "Drivers 25 and Under to Watch." Later that year, he secured his first career win in the K&N Pro Series East during the series' inaugural race at Five Flags Speedway in his home state of Florida. Kennedy also announced plans to compete in three Camping World Truck Series races with Turner Scott Motorsports, racing at Bristol Motor Speedway, Iowa Speedway, and Homestead–Miami Speedway. He ultimately participated in five events, achieving a best finish of fourth at Martinsville Speedway. Kennedy capped off the season by being named the K&N Pro Series East's Most Popular Driver for 2013.

In December 2013, it was announced that Kennedy would drive the No. 31 Chevrolet Silverado full-time for Turner Scott Motorsports in the 2014 NASCAR Camping World Truck Series season, competing for Rookie of the Year. Kennedy earned eight top-ten finishes and claimed Rookie of the Year honors. However, the team ceased operations at the end of the season.

In December 2014, Kennedy was announced as the driver of the No. 11 Local Motors Toyota Tundra for Red Horse Racing.

On July 9, 2015, during a race in Kentucky, Kennedy was involved in an incident with seven laps remaining. David Gilliland clipped Kennedy, sending his truck into the fence and causing significant damage to the rear. The crash led to a red flag, and the race was ultimately called off with five laps remaining. Despite the severity of the crash, Kennedy was uninjured.

On February 14, 2016, Kennedy announced his return to Red Horse Racing with new sponsor JACOB Companies. However, on April 15, the team announced that Kennedy had parted ways with them. Just ten days later, he joined GMS Racing to drive the No. 33 Chevrolet Silverado. On August 17, 2016, after setbacks for both Daniel Suárez and William Byron, Kennedy secured a victory in the Bristol race, defeating Brett Moffitt in a thrilling duel. This win qualified him for the inaugural Truck Series Chase. Kennedy advanced from the Round of 8 to the Round of 6 but was eliminated after the Lucas Oil 150. He finished the season seventh in points.

During the 2016 season, Kennedy made his Xfinity Series debut, driving the No. 2 Chevrolet for Richard Childress Racing at Iowa Speedway. He qualified sixth and finished tenth.

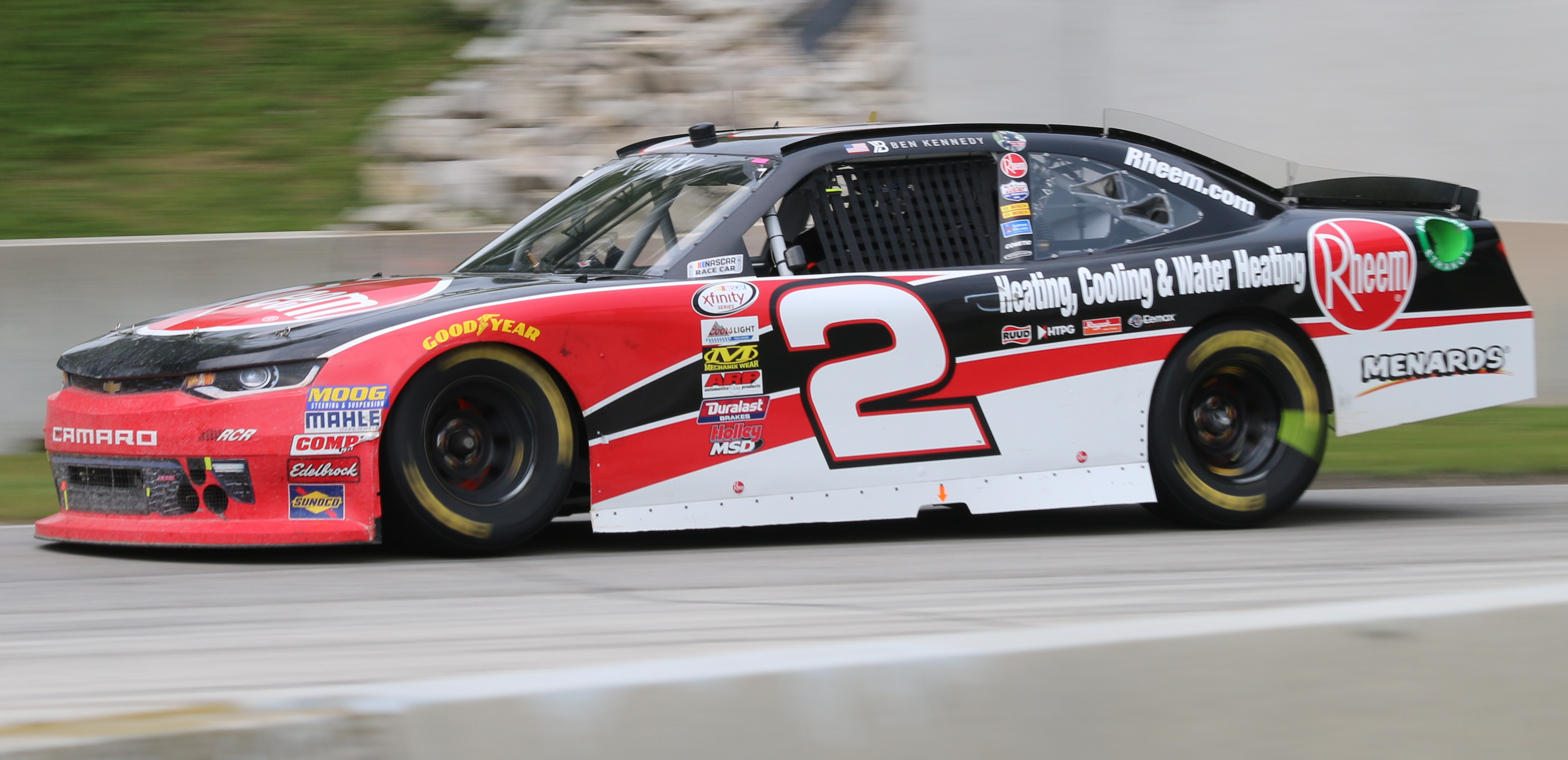
Kennedy at Road America in 2017

On February 6, 2017, it was announced that Kennedy would compete in nine Xfinity Series races for Richard Childress Racing, sharing the No. 2 car with Austin Dillon and Paul Menard. During the offseason, Kennedy received an offer to drive in the Monster Energy NASCAR Cup Series from an undisclosed team, along with other opportunities. However, he opted for the part-time Xfinity ride, valuing the experience and guidance available within an established Cup organization. Later, Kennedy expanded his schedule with a twelve-race agreement to drive the No. 96 car for GMS Racing.

== Motorsports career results ==
=== NASCAR ===
(key) (Bold – Pole position awarded by qualifying time. Italics – Pole position earned by points standings or practice time. * – Most laps led.)

==== Xfinity Series ====
NASCAR Xfinity Series results
Year	Team	No.	Make	1	2	3	4	5	6	7	8	9	10	11	12	13	14	15	16	17	18	19	20	21	22	23	24	25	26	27	28	29	30	31	32	33	NXSC	Pts	Ref
2016	Richard Childress Racing	2	Chevy	DAY	ATL	LVS	PHO	CAL	TEX	BRI	RCH	TAL	DOV	CLT	POC	MCH	IOW; 10	DAY	KEN	NHA	IND	IOW	GLN	MOH	BRI	ROA	DAR	RCH	CHI	KEN	DOV	CLT	KAN	TEX	PHO	HOM	106th	0^{1}	
2017	Richard Childress Racing	2	Chevy	DAY	ATL	LVS	PHO	CAL	TEX	BRI	RCH	TAL; 4					IOW; 20	DAY; 16		NHA; 6		IOW; 23	GLN	MOH; 26		ROA; 18				KEN; 11						HOM; 18	23rd	326	
2017	GMS Racing	96	Chevy										CLT; 25	DOV; 18	POC; Wth	MCH; 36			KEN; 32		IND; 18				BRI; 19		DAR; 12	RCH; Wth	CHI; Wth		DOV; Wth	CLT; Wth	KAN	TEX	PHO		23rd	326	

==== Camping World Truck Series ====
NASCAR Camping World Truck Series results
Year	Team	No.	Make	1	2	3	4	5	6	7	8	9	10	11	12	13	14	15	16	17	18	19	20	21	22	23	NCWTC	Pts	Ref
2013	Ben Kennedy Racing	96	Chevy	DAY	MAR	CAR	KAN	CLT	DOV	TEX	KEN	IOW	ELD	POC	MCH	BRI; 20	MSP	IOW; 15									33rd	135	
2013	Turner Scott Motorsports	30	Chevy																CHI; 16	LVS	TAL	MAR; 4	TEX	PHO	HOM; 30		33rd	135	
2014	Turner Scott Motorsports	31	Chevy	DAY; 15*	MAR; 3	KAN; 20	CLT; 8	DOV; 7	TEX; 14	GTW; 14	KEN; 10	IOW; 6	ELD; 13	POC; 13	MCH; 19	BRI; 21	MSP; 16	CHI; 7	NHA; 13	LVS; 7	TAL; 28	MAR; 16	TEX; 15	PHO; 11	HOM; 17		9th	679	
2015	Red Horse Racing	11	Toyota	DAY; 28	**ATL**; 3	MAR; 19	KAN; 26	CLT; 16	DOV; 6	TEX; 10	GTW; 7	IOW; 13	KEN; 16	ELD; 12	POC; 11	MCH; 25	BRI; 15	MSP; 3	CHI; 12	NHA; 23	LVS; 3	TAL; 25	MAR; 14	TEX; 9	PHO; 24	HOM; 4	9th	690	
2016	Red Horse Racing	11	Toyota	DAY; 23	ATL; 15	MAR; 11																					7th	2162	
2016	GMS Racing	33	Chevy				KAN; 9		CLT; 14	TEX; 4	IOW; 7	GTW; 9	KEN; 22	ELD; 11	POC; 7	BRI; 1	MCH; 11	MSP; 8	CHI; 26	NHA; 11	LVS; 4	TAL; 5	MAR; 18	TEX; 13	PHO; 9	HOM; 14	7th	2162	
2016	GMS Racing	24	Chevy					DOV; 13																			7th	2162	

==== K&N Pro Series East ====
NASCAR K&N Pro Series East results
Year	Team	No.	Make	1	2	3	4	5	6	7	8	9	10	11	12	13	14	NKNPSEC	Pts	Ref
2010	Ben Kennedy Racing	96	Chevy	GRE	SBO	IOW	MAR	NHA	LRP	LEE	JFC; 24	NHA	DOV					60th	91	
2011	Ben Kennedy Racing	96	Chevy	GRE; 11	SBO; 14	RCH; 27	IOW; 15	BGS; 3	JFC; 11	LGY; 18	NHA; 32	COL; 19	GRE; 22	NHA; 16	DOV; 12			13th	1367	
2012	Ben Kennedy Racing	96	Chevy	BRI; 6	GRE; 9	RCH; 6	IOW; 22	BGS; 8	JFC; 5	LGY; 21	CNB; 3	**COL**; 7	IOW; 19	NHA; 25	DOV; 4	GRE; 16	CAR; 9	9th	456	
2013	Ben Kennedy Racing	96	Chevy	BRI; 10	GRE; 17	**FIF**; 1*	RCH; 14	BGS; 1	IOW; 9	LGY; 7	COL; 9	IOW; 11	VIR; 4	GRE; 10	NHA; 26	DOV; 12	RAL; 6	4th	488	
2017	Kevin Manion Motorsports	1	Toyota	NSM	GRE	BRI	SBO	SBO	MEM	BLN	TMP	NHA	IOW; 7	GLN	LGY	NJM	DOV	45th	38	

==== K&N Pro Series West ====
NASCAR K&N Pro Series West results
Year	Team	No.	Make	1	2	3	4	5	6	7	8	9	10	11	12	13	14	15	NKNPSWC	Pts	Ref
2011	Ben Kennedy Racing	96	Chevy	PHO	AAS	MMP	IOW	LVS	SON	IRW	EVG	PIR	CNS; 8				PHO; 15		34th	402	
2011	Ben Kennedy Racing	96	Toyota											MRP; 8	SPO	AAS			34th	402	
2012	Ben Kennedy Racing	96	Toyota	PHO; 11	LHC	MMP	S99	IOW	BIR	LVS	SON	EVG	CNS; 9	IOW	PIR	SMP	AAS	PHO; 10	27th	102	
2015	Ben Kennedy Racing	96	Toyota	KCR	IRW	TUS	IOW	SHA	SON	SLS	IOW	EVG	CNS	MER	AAS	PHO; 25			69th	19	

^{*} Season still in progress

^{1} Ineligible for series points
