= 2016 NASCAR Camping World Truck Series =

American motorsport season

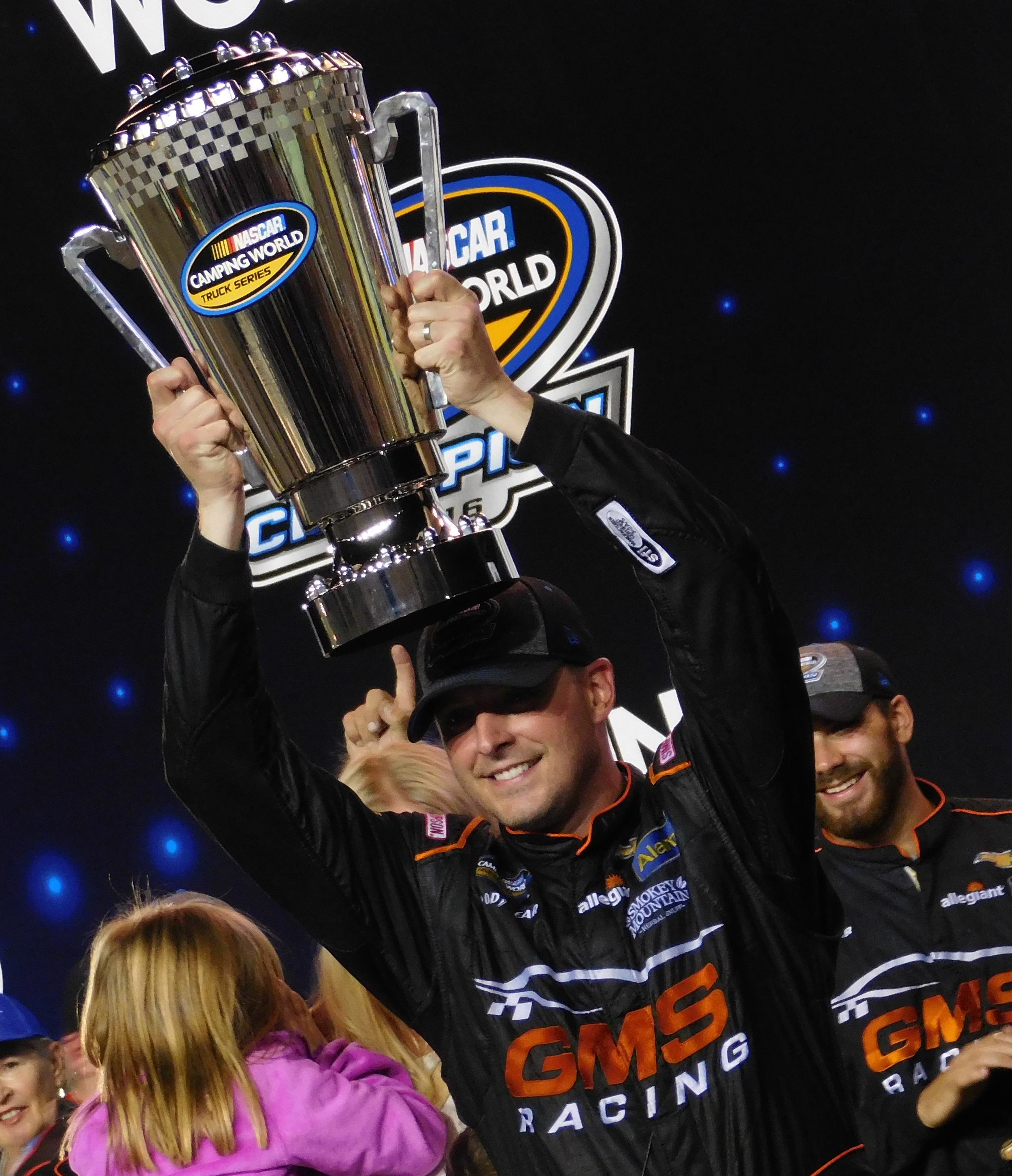
Johnny Sauter, the 2016 Camping World Truck Series champion.

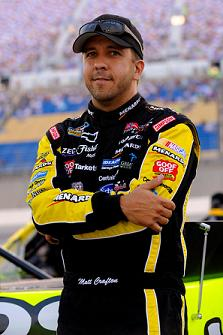
Matt Crafton, the 2013 and 2014 champion, finished second behind Sauter in the championship.

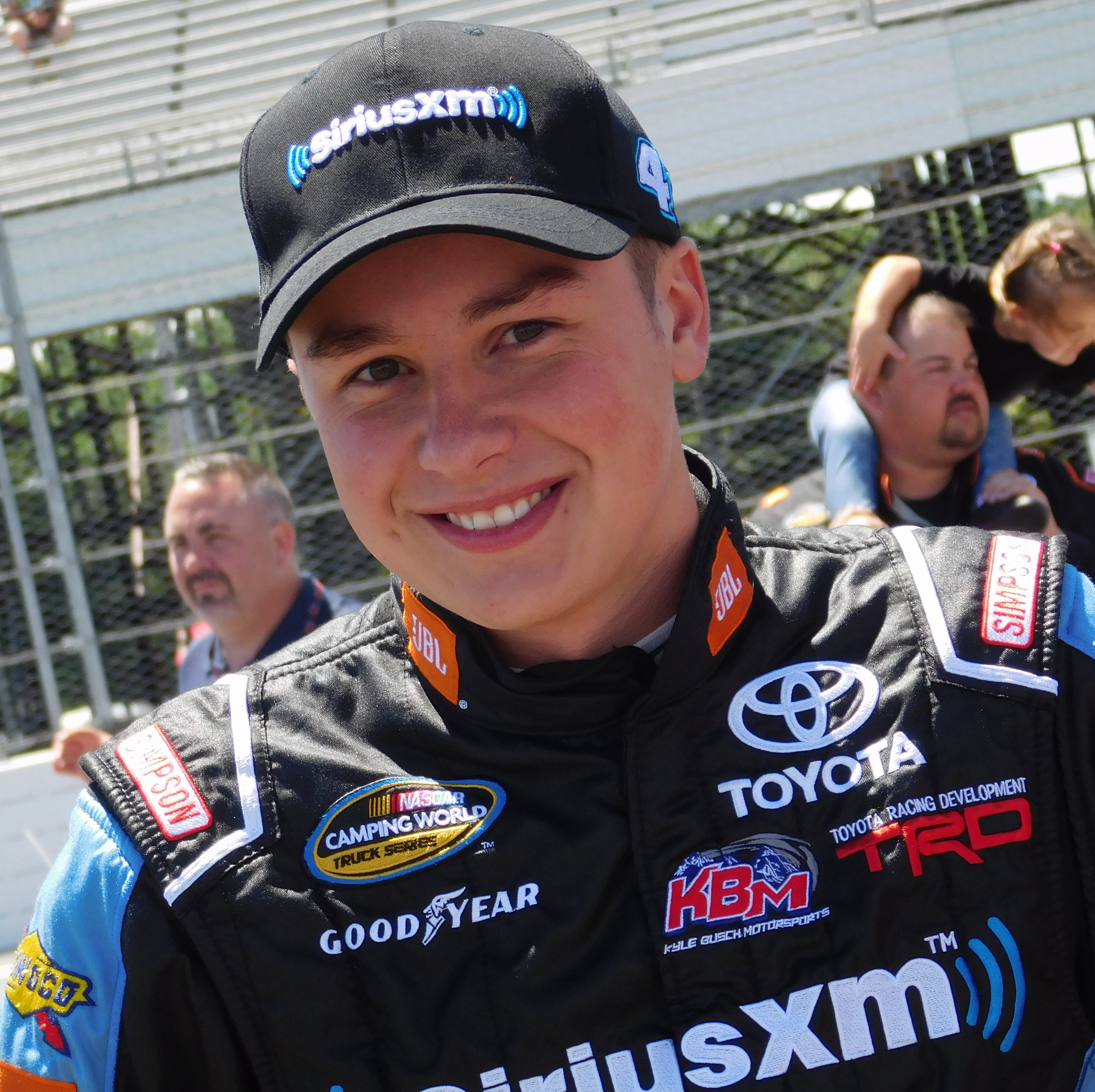
Christopher Bell, finished third in the championship.

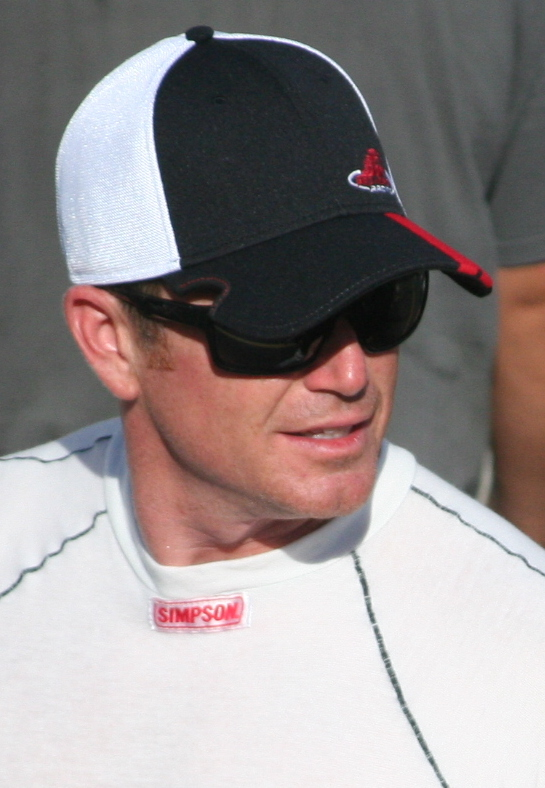
Timothy Peters, finished fourth in the championship.

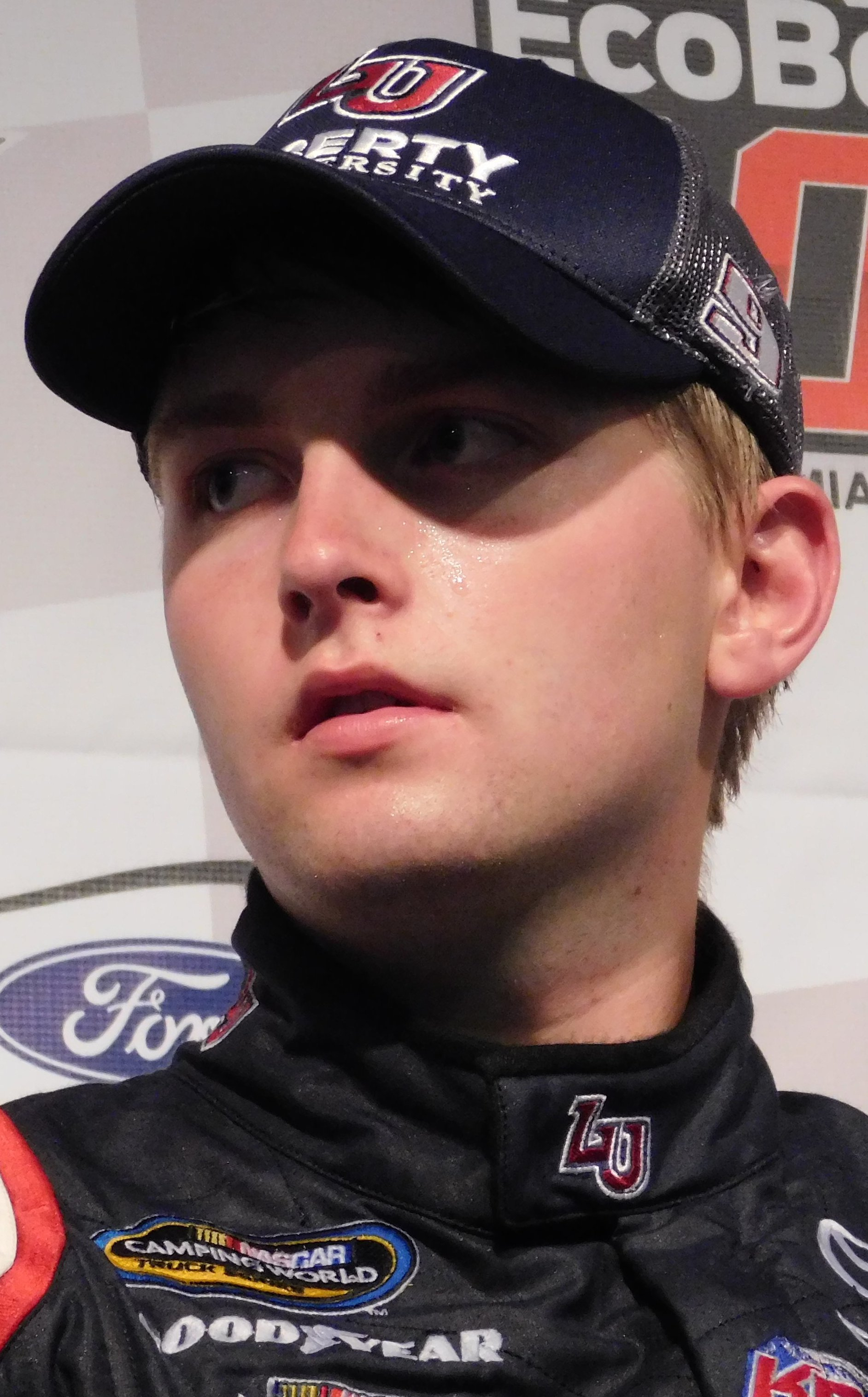
William Byron fininished fifth in the championship and was the Rookie of the Year.

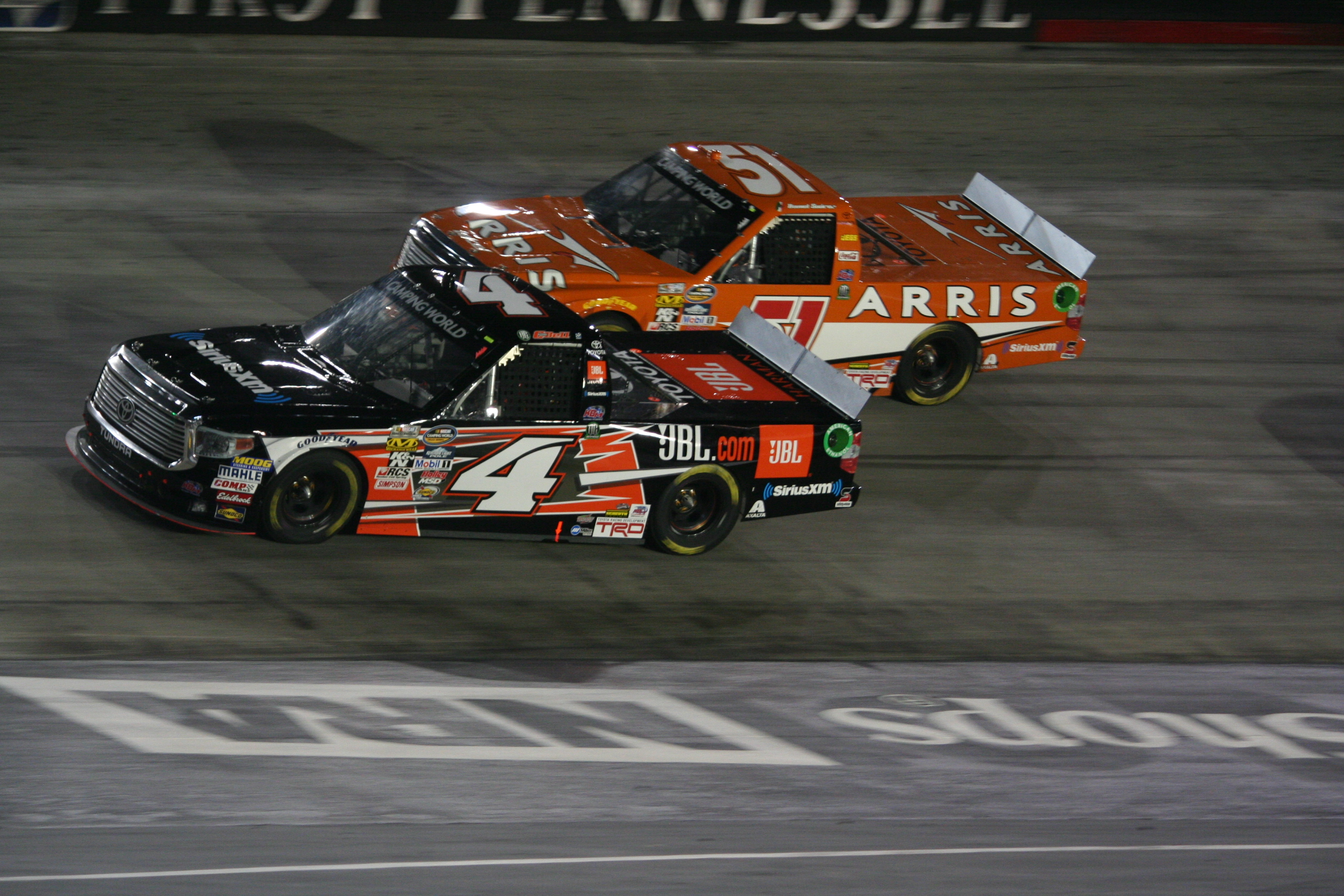
Toyota won the Manufacturers' championship with 14 wins and 787 points.

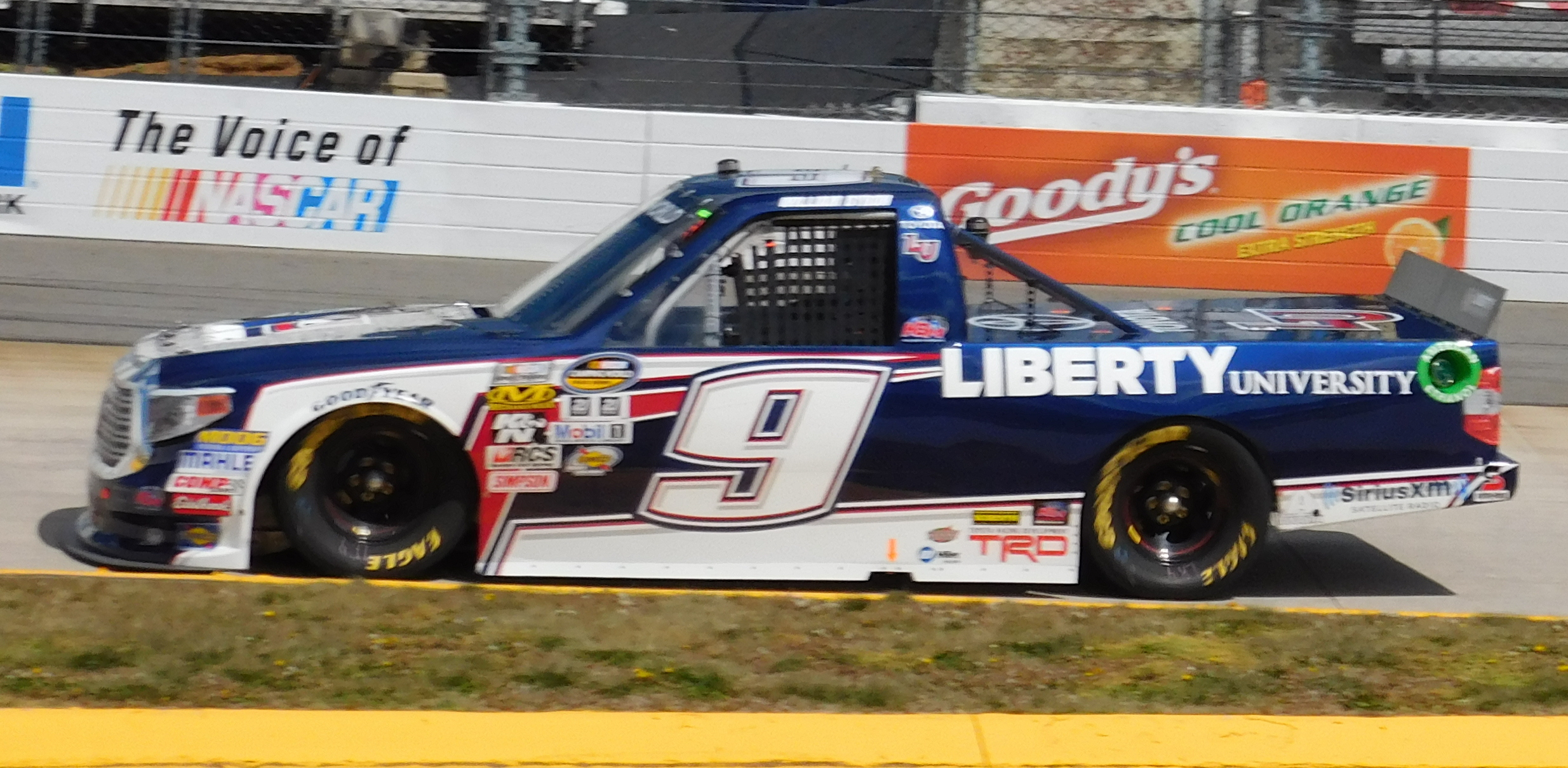
The No. 9 for Kyle Busch Motorsports, driven entirely by William Byron, won the Owners' championship.

The 2016 NASCAR Camping World Truck Series was the 22nd season of the Camping World Truck Series, the pickup truck racing series sanctioned by NASCAR in North America. It was contested over twenty-three races, beginning with the NextEra Energy Resources 250 at Daytona International Speedway and ending with the Ford EcoBoost 200 at Homestead–Miami Speedway. Johnny Sauter of GMS Racing won the driver's championship with three victories. Toyota won the manufacturer's championship with 14 wins and 32 points over Chevrolet.

This was the first year that the truck series (and the Xfinity Series) had a playoff system. Just like in the Cup Series, four drivers competed for the title in the final race at Homestead, also the final round of the playoffs. Those drivers are shown below.

2016 was the final year to feature RAM in competition. Despite losing factory support following the 2012 season, several independent teams continued to run RAMs until the body style aged out. RAM would not return to the series until 2026.

== Teams and drivers ==
=== Complete schedule ===
Manufacturer	Team	No.	Race Driver(s)	Crew Chief
Chevrolet	Athenian Motorsports	05	John Wes Townley 18	Michael Shelton 4 James Villenueve 19
Chevrolet	Athenian Motorsports	05	Parker Kligerman 1	Michael Shelton 4 James Villenueve 19
Chevrolet	Athenian Motorsports	05	Brady Boswell 2	Michael Shelton 4 James Villenueve 19
Chevrolet	Athenian Motorsports	05	Cody Coughlin (R) 1	Michael Shelton 4 James Villenueve 19
Chevrolet	Athenian Motorsports	05	Dylan Lupton 1	Michael Shelton 4 James Villenueve 19
Chevrolet	GMS Racing	21	Johnny Sauter	Marcus Richmond 6 Joe Shear Jr. 17
Chevrolet	GMS Racing	23	Spencer Gallagher	Jeff Hensley
Chevrolet	GMS Racing	33	Grant Enfinger (R) 2	Jeff Stankiewicz 6 Marcus Richmond 1 Joey Cohen 16
Chevrolet	GMS Racing	33	Kaz Grala 2	Jeff Stankiewicz 6 Marcus Richmond 1 Joey Cohen 16
Chevrolet	GMS Racing	33	Ben Kennedy 19	Jeff Stankiewicz 6 Marcus Richmond 1 Joey Cohen 16
Chevrolet	Jennifer Jo Cobb Racing	10	Jennifer Jo Cobb 8	Steve Kuykendall 9 Austin Zivich 10; Danny Gill 1
Chevrolet	Jennifer Jo Cobb Racing	10	Claire Decker 2	Steve Kuykendall 9 Austin Zivich 10; Danny Gill 1
Chevrolet	Jennifer Jo Cobb Racing	10	Caleb Roark 8	Steve Kuykendall 9 Austin Zivich 10; Danny Gill 1
Chevrolet	Jennifer Jo Cobb Racing	10	Cody McMahan 1	Steve Kuykendall 9 Austin Zivich 10; Danny Gill 1
Chevrolet	Jennifer Jo Cobb Racing	10	Clay Greenfield 1 (Note: Entries were fielded in a collaboration with Clay Greenfield Motorsports.)	Steve Kuykendall 9 Austin Zivich 10; Danny Gill 1
Chevrolet	Jennifer Jo Cobb Racing	10	Brad Foy 1	Steve Kuykendall 9 Austin Zivich 10; Danny Gill 1
Chevrolet	Jennifer Jo Cobb Racing	10	Ryan Ellis 1	Steve Kuykendall 9 Austin Zivich 10; Danny Gill 1
Chevrolet	Jennifer Jo Cobb Racing	10	Tommy Regan 1	Steve Kuykendall 9 Austin Zivich 10; Danny Gill 1
Chevrolet	JR Motorsports	00	Cole Custer (R)	Joe Shear Jr. 6 Dave McCarty 1 Marcus Richmond 16
Chevrolet	JR Motorsports	49	Nick Drake 2 (Note: Entry was fielded in a collaboration with Premium Motorsports.)	Dave McCarty
Chevrolet	Premium Motorsports	49	Timmy Hill 6	Wayne Edwards 1 Jeff Spraker 6 Jay Robinson 2 Ben Leslie 1 Scott Eggleston 1 Rob Winfield 1
Chevrolet	Premium Motorsports	49	Wayne Edwards 3	Wayne Edwards 1 Jeff Spraker 6 Jay Robinson 2 Ben Leslie 1 Scott Eggleston 1 Rob Winfield 1
Chevrolet	Premium Motorsports	49	Spencer Boyd 1	Wayne Edwards 1 Jeff Spraker 6 Jay Robinson 2 Ben Leslie 1 Scott Eggleston 1 Rob Winfield 1
Chevrolet	Premium Motorsports	49	Reed Sorenson 6	Wayne Edwards 1 Jeff Spraker 6 Jay Robinson 2 Ben Leslie 1 Scott Eggleston 1 Rob Winfield 1
Chevrolet	Premium Motorsports	49	Bryce Napier 2 (Note: Napier's races in the No. 49 were fielded in a collaboration with Rick Ware Racing.)	Wayne Edwards 1 Jeff Spraker 6 Jay Robinson 2 Ben Leslie 1 Scott Eggleston 1 Rob Winfield 1
Chevrolet	Premium Motorsports	49	D. J. Kennington 2	Wayne Edwards 1 Jeff Spraker 6 Jay Robinson 2 Ben Leslie 1 Scott Eggleston 1 Rob Winfield 1
Chevrolet	Premium Motorsports	49	Josh Wise 1	Wayne Edwards 1 Jeff Spraker 6 Jay Robinson 2 Ben Leslie 1 Scott Eggleston 1 Rob Winfield 1
Chevrolet	MAKE Motorsports	50	Travis Kvapil 21 (Note: All races that Jennifer Jo Cobb Racing fielded the No. 1 truck, these entries were fielded in a collaboration with MAKE Motorsports. At Kentucky Speedway (Race 10) Travis Kvapil wrecked his MAKE Motorsports' truck in practice and did not have a backup. So Kvapil took Jennifer's No. 1 truck and renumbered it to No. 50. Jennifer Jo Cobb used her backup truck and renumbered it to No. 10, Caleb Roark drove the No. 1 truck that was a Premium Motorsports truck they borrowed to S&P.)	Jeff Barnes 3 Daniel Sowers Jr. 2 Brian Lear 18
Chevrolet	MAKE Motorsports	50	Ryan Ellis 1	Jeff Barnes 3 Daniel Sowers Jr. 2 Brian Lear 18
Chevrolet	MAKE Motorsports	50	Spencer Boyd 1	Jeff Barnes 3 Daniel Sowers Jr. 2 Brian Lear 18
Chevrolet	NEMCO Motorsports	8	John Hunter Nemechek	Gere Kennon Jr.
Ford	Brad Keselowski Racing	19	Daniel Hemric	Chad Kendrick
Ford	Brad Keselowski Racing	29	Tyler Reddick	Doug Randolph
Toyota	AM Racing	22	Austin Wayne Self (R) 21	Marc Browning 9 Rick Ren 13; Bill Henderson 1
Toyota	AM Racing	22	Justin Fontaine 1	Marc Browning 9 Rick Ren 13; Bill Henderson 1
Toyota	AM Racing	22	Myatt Snider 1	Marc Browning 9 Rick Ren 13; Bill Henderson 1
Toyota	Kyle Busch Motorsports	4	Christopher Bell (R)	Jerry Baxter
Toyota	Kyle Busch Motorsports	9	William Byron (R)	Rudy Fugle
Toyota	Kyle Busch Motorsports	51	Daniel Suárez 13	Kevin Manion
Toyota	Kyle Busch Motorsports	51	Cody Coughlin (R) 8	Kevin Manion
Toyota	Kyle Busch Motorsports	51	Erik Jones 1	Kevin Manion
Toyota	Kyle Busch Motorsports	51	Gary Klutt 1	Kevin Manion
Toyota	Red Horse Racing	11	Ben Kennedy 3	Scott Zipadelli 22; Butch Hylton 1
Toyota	Red Horse Racing	11	Matt Tifft (R) 10	Scott Zipadelli 22; Butch Hylton 1
Toyota	Red Horse Racing	11	Germán Quiroga 3	Scott Zipadelli 22; Butch Hylton 1
Toyota	Red Horse Racing	11	Brett Moffitt 6	Scott Zipadelli 22; Butch Hylton 1
Toyota	Red Horse Racing	11	Jake Griffin 1	Scott Zipadelli 22; Butch Hylton 1
Toyota	Red Horse Racing	17	Timothy Peters	Shane Huffman
Toyota	ThorSport Racing	13	Cameron Hayley	Eddie Troconis
Toyota	ThorSport Racing	41	Ben Rhodes (R)	Kevin Bellicourt
Toyota	ThorSport Racing	88	Matt Crafton	Carl Joiner Jr.
Toyota	ThorSport Racing	98	Rico Abreu (R)	Doug George 18; Bud Haefele 5
Chevrolet	Bolen Motorsports	66	Jordan Anderson 19	Paul Clapprood
Chevrolet	Bolen Motorsports	66	Ross Chastain 1	Paul Clapprood
Chevrolet	Mike Harmon Racing	66	Tim Viens 1	Paul Clapprood
Chevrolet	Mike Harmon Racing	66	Josh Reeves 1	Paul Clapprood
Toyota	AM Racing	66	Austin Wayne Self (R) 1	Paul Clapprood
Chevrolet	Martins Motorsports	44	Tommy Joe Martins 22	Kevin Eagle
Chevrolet	Martins Motorsports	44	J. R. Heffner 1	Kevin Eagle
Toyota	Martins Motorsports	44	Austin Wayne Self (R) 1 (Note: Tommy Joe Martins qualified the No. 44 truck for the race, but crashed in qualifying. He contacted Austin Wayne Self and the No. 22 team, who initially didn't make the race, to run with the No. 44 but in Self's (Toyota) truck.)	Kevin Eagle
Chevrolet	Ranier Racing with MDM (Note: Entries were fielded in a collaboration with Contreras Motorsports.)	71	Brandon Jones 5	Tim Andrews 7 Bobby Gill 4 Carlos Contreras 1 Ken Evans 1 Josh Stenberg 1 Wade Lear 1 Jerry Babb 3 Thomas Bear 2
Chevrolet	Ranier Racing with MDM	71	Austin Dillon 1	Tim Andrews 7 Bobby Gill 4 Carlos Contreras 1 Ken Evans 1 Josh Stenberg 1 Wade Lear 1 Jerry Babb 3 Thomas Bear 2
Chevrolet	Contreras Motorsports	71	Carlos Contreras 5	Tim Andrews 7 Bobby Gill 4 Carlos Contreras 1 Ken Evans 1 Josh Stenberg 1 Wade Lear 1 Jerry Babb 3 Thomas Bear 2
Chevrolet	Contreras Motorsports	71	Mike Bliss 2	Tim Andrews 7 Bobby Gill 4 Carlos Contreras 1 Ken Evans 1 Josh Stenberg 1 Wade Lear 1 Jerry Babb 3 Thomas Bear 2
Chevrolet	Contreras Motorsports	71	Enrique Contreras III 2	Tim Andrews 7 Bobby Gill 4 Carlos Contreras 1 Ken Evans 1 Josh Stenberg 1 Wade Lear 1 Jerry Babb 3 Thomas Bear 2
Chevrolet	Contreras Motorsports	71	Camden Murphy 1 (Note: Entries were fielded in a collaboration with SS-Green Light Racing.)	Tim Andrews 7 Bobby Gill 4 Carlos Contreras 1 Ken Evans 1 Josh Stenberg 1 Wade Lear 1 Jerry Babb 3 Thomas Bear 2
Chevrolet	Contreras Motorsports	71	Josh Berry 1	Tim Andrews 7 Bobby Gill 4 Carlos Contreras 1 Ken Evans 1 Josh Stenberg 1 Wade Lear 1 Jerry Babb 3 Thomas Bear 2
Chevrolet	Contreras Motorsports	71	Alon Day 2	Tim Andrews 7 Bobby Gill 4 Carlos Contreras 1 Ken Evans 1 Josh Stenberg 1 Wade Lear 1 Jerry Babb 3 Thomas Bear 2
Chevrolet	Contreras Motorsports	71	Brandon Hightower 1	Tim Andrews 7 Bobby Gill 4 Carlos Contreras 1 Ken Evans 1 Josh Stenberg 1 Wade Lear 1 Jerry Babb 3 Thomas Bear 2
Chevrolet	Contreras Motorsports	71	Chase Elliott 1 (Note: Entry was fielded in a collaboration with JR Motorsports.)	Tim Andrews 7 Bobby Gill 4 Carlos Contreras 1 Ken Evans 1 Josh Stenberg 1 Wade Lear 1 Jerry Babb 3 Thomas Bear 2
Chevrolet	Contreras Motorsports	71	Kevin Donahue 1 (Note: Entries were fielded in a collaboration with MB Motorsports.)	Tim Andrews 7 Bobby Gill 4 Carlos Contreras 1 Ken Evans 1 Josh Stenberg 1 Wade Lear 1 Jerry Babb 3 Thomas Bear 2
Toyota	Contreras Motorsports	71	Ken Schrader 1 (Note: Entry was fielded in a collaboration with Ken Schrader Racing.)	Donnie Richeson
RAM	Jennifer Jo Cobb Racing	1	Clay Greenfield 1	Steve Kuykendall
Chevrolet	Jennifer Jo Cobb Racing	1	Jennifer Jo Cobb 12	Steve Kuykendall
Chevrolet	Jennifer Jo Cobb Racing	1	Caleb Roark 1	Austin Zivich
Chevrolet	Jennifer Jo Cobb Racing	1	Josh White 1	Daniel Sowers Jr. 5 Joe Lax 1 David Adams Jr. 2
Chevrolet	FDNY Racing	1	Andy Seuss 1 (Note: Entries were fielded in a collaboration with MAKE Motorsports.)	Daniel Sowers Jr. 5 Joe Lax 1 David Adams Jr. 2
Chevrolet	MAKE Motorsports	1	David Levine 1	Daniel Sowers Jr. 5 Joe Lax 1 David Adams Jr. 2
Chevrolet	MAKE Motorsports	1	Travis Kvapil 2	Daniel Sowers Jr. 5 Joe Lax 1 David Adams Jr. 2
Chevrolet	MAKE Motorsports	1	Ryan Ellis 2	Daniel Sowers Jr. 5 Joe Lax 1 David Adams Jr. 2
Chevrolet	Rick Ware Racing	1	Bryce Napier 1	Daniel Sowers Jr. 5 Joe Lax 1 David Adams Jr. 2
Ford	Austin Hill Racing	1	Austin Hill 1	Daniel Sowers Jr. 5 Joe Lax 1 David Adams Jr. 2
Chevrolet	Norm Benning Racing	63	Norm Benning 8	Brian Poff
Chevrolet	MB Motorsports	63	Reed Sorenson 1	Tripp Bruce 8 Mike Mittler 5 Rick Ren 2
Chevrolet	MB Motorsports	63	Garrett Smithley 1	Tripp Bruce 8 Mike Mittler 5 Rick Ren 2
Chevrolet	MB Motorsports	63	Bobby Pierce 4	Tripp Bruce 8 Mike Mittler 5 Rick Ren 2
Chevrolet	MB Motorsports	63	Mike Bliss 1	Tripp Bruce 8 Mike Mittler 5 Rick Ren 2
Chevrolet	MB Motorsports	63	Jake Griffin 3	Tripp Bruce 8 Mike Mittler 5 Rick Ren 2
Chevrolet	MB Motorsports	63	Jesse Little 1	Tripp Bruce 8 Mike Mittler 5 Rick Ren 2
Chevrolet	MB Motorsports	63	Akinori Ogata 1	Tripp Bruce 8 Mike Mittler 5 Rick Ren 2
Chevrolet	MB Motorsports	63	Ryan Ellis 1	Tripp Bruce 8 Mike Mittler 5 Rick Ren 2
Chevrolet	MB Motorsports	63	Kyle Donahue 1	Tripp Bruce 8 Mike Mittler 5 Rick Ren 2
RAM	MB Motorsports	63	Spencer Boyd 1	Tripp Bruce 8 Mike Mittler 5 Rick Ren 2
Chevrolet	MB Motorsports	07	Kevin Donahue 1	Jason Miller 3 Jamie Jones 1 Ken Evans 16; Keith Wolfe 2
Chevrolet	SS-Green Light Racing	07	Michel Disdier 1	Jason Miller 3 Jamie Jones 1 Ken Evans 16; Keith Wolfe 2
Chevrolet	SS-Green Light Racing	07	J. J. Yeley 1	Jason Miller 3 Jamie Jones 1 Ken Evans 16; Keith Wolfe 2
Chevrolet	SS-Green Light Racing	07	B. J. McLeod 1	Jason Miller 3 Jamie Jones 1 Ken Evans 16; Keith Wolfe 2
Chevrolet	SS-Green Light Racing	07	C. J. Faison 1	Jason Miller 3 Jamie Jones 1 Ken Evans 16; Keith Wolfe 2
Chevrolet	SS-Green Light Racing	07	Garrett Smithley 2	Jason Miller 3 Jamie Jones 1 Ken Evans 16; Keith Wolfe 2
Chevrolet	SS-Green Light Racing	07	Ryan Lynch 1	Jason Miller 3 Jamie Jones 1 Ken Evans 16; Keith Wolfe 2
Chevrolet	SS-Green Light Racing	07	Casey Smith 1	Jason Miller 3 Jamie Jones 1 Ken Evans 16; Keith Wolfe 2
Chevrolet	SS-Green Light Racing	07	Sheldon Creed 1	Jason Miller 3 Jamie Jones 1 Ken Evans 16; Keith Wolfe 2
Chevrolet	SS-Green Light Racing	07	Todd Peck 3 (Note: Entry was fielded in a collaboration with Peck Motorsports.)	Jason Miller 3 Jamie Jones 1 Ken Evans 16; Keith Wolfe 2
Chevrolet	SS-Green Light Racing	07	Matt Mills 4	Jason Miller 3 Jamie Jones 1 Ken Evans 16; Keith Wolfe 2
Chevrolet	SS-Green Light Racing	07	Cody Ware 2	Jason Miller 3 Jamie Jones 1 Ken Evans 16; Keith Wolfe 2
Chevrolet	SS-Green Light Racing	07	Ray Black Jr. 1	Jason Miller 3 Jamie Jones 1 Ken Evans 16; Keith Wolfe 2
Chevrolet	SS-Green Light Racing	07	Patrick Staropoli 1 (Note: Entries were fielded in a collaboration with Young's Motorsports.)	Jason Miller 3 Jamie Jones 1 Ken Evans 16; Keith Wolfe 2
Toyota	Win-Tron Racing	07	Shane Lee 2	Jason Miller 3 Jamie Jones 1 Ken Evans 16; Keith Wolfe 2
Chevrolet	Young's Motorsports	02	Tyler Young 14	Andrew Abbott
Chevrolet	Young's Motorsports	02	Derek Scott Jr. 1	Andrew Abbott
Chevrolet	Young's Motorsports	02	Dylan Lupton 1	Andrew Abbott
Chevrolet	Young's Motorsports	02	Austin Theriault 1	Andrew Abbott
Chevrolet	Young's Motorsports	02	Scott Lagasse Jr. 1	Andrew Abbott
Ford	Austin Hill Racing	02	Austin Hill 4	Andrew Abbott
Ford	Rette Jones Racing	02	Dominique Van Wieringen 1	Andrew Abbott

=== Limited schedule ===
Manufacturer	Team	No.	Race Driver(s)	Crew Chief	Rounds
Chevrolet	Bill Martel Racing	59	Kyle Martel	Bill Martel	1
Chevrolet	Bobby Gerhart Racing	36	Bobby Gerhart	Brian Keselowski	2
Chevrolet	Brandonbilt Motorsports (Note: Entry at Gateway was fielded in a collaboration with MAKE Motorsports.)	86	Brandon Brown	Adam Brenner	13
Chevrolet	Mike Harmon Racing	86	Tim Viens	Mike Harmon	1
Chevrolet	Clay Greenfield Motorsports	68	Clay Greenfield	Danny Gill	1
Chevrolet	FDNY Racing	28	Ryan Ellis	Dick Rahilly	2
Chevrolet	FDNY Racing	28	Kyle Soper	Dick Rahilly	1
Chevrolet	GMS Racing	24	Kyle Larson	Joey Cohen 3 Jeff Stankiewicz 19	3
Chevrolet	GMS Racing	24	Clint Bowyer	Joey Cohen 3 Jeff Stankiewicz 19	1
Chevrolet	GMS Racing	24	Ben Kennedy	Joey Cohen 3 Jeff Stankiewicz 19	1
Chevrolet	GMS Racing	24	Kaz Grala	Joey Cohen 3 Jeff Stankiewicz 19	7
Chevrolet	GMS Racing	24	Grant Enfinger (R)	Joey Cohen 3 Jeff Stankiewicz 19	5
Chevrolet	GMS Racing	24	Shane Lee	Joey Cohen 3 Jeff Stankiewicz 19	1
Chevrolet	Halmar Racing	16	Stewart Friesen	Harold Holly	6
Chevrolet	Niece Motorsports	45	Casey Smith	J. R. Norris	2
Chevrolet	Norm Benning Racing	6	Norm Benning	Brian Poff	8
Chevrolet	Norm Benning Racing	6	Sean Corr	Dan Sheffer	1
Chevrolet	Norm Benning Racing	6	Ryan Ellis	Dan Sheffer	1
Chevrolet	NTS Motorsports	14	Scott Lagasse Jr.	Rick Ren	1
Chevrolet	MAKE Motorsports	14	Natalie Decker (Note: Entry was fielded in a collaboration with NTS Motorsports.)	Daniel Sowers Jr.	1
Chevrolet	Empire Racing	82	Sean Corr	Wesley Gonder	1
Ford	Empire Racing	43	Korbin Forrister	Mike Cheek	1
Ford	Empire Racing	43	Austin Hill	Mike Cheek	1
Ford	Austin Hill Racing	20	Austin Hill	Doug Chouinard	6
Ford	Brad Keselowski Racing	2	Austin Theriault	Buddy Sisco	2
Ford	Brad Keselowski Racing	2	Austin Cindric	Greg Erwin	5
Ford	Jacob Wallace Racing	80	Justin Shipley	Wayne Hansard	1
Ford	Lira Motorsports	58	Ryan Reed	Teddy Brown	1
Ford	Lira Motorsports	59	Korbin Forrister	Bryan Quanz 1 Teddy Brown 1	2
Ford	RBR Enterprises	92	Parker Kligerman	Michael Hester	10
Ford	RBR Enterprises	92	Cole Whitt	Michael Hester	1
Ford	RBR Enterprises	92	Grant Enfinger	Michael Hester	1
Toyota	Hattori Racing Enterprises	81	Ryan Truex	John Monsam 3 Richie Wauters 2 J. R. Norris 3 Adam Crigger 1	15
Toyota	Hattori Racing Enterprises	81	Jesse Little	John Monsam 3 Richie Wauters 2 J. R. Norris 3 Adam Crigger 1	1
Toyota	Rette Jones Racing	81	Jesse Little	John Monsam 3 Richie Wauters 2 J. R. Norris 3 Adam Crigger 1	1 (Note: Entry was fielded by Rette Jones Racing in a collaboration with Hattori Racing Enterprises.)
Toyota	Rette Jones Racing	30	Jesse Little	Mark Rette	1
Toyota	JJL Motorsports	97	Jesse Little	Matt Noyce	2
Toyota	Kyle Busch Motorsports	18	Cody Coughlin (R)	Wes Ward	1
Toyota	Kyle Busch Motorsports	18	Kyle Busch	Wes Ward	4
Toyota	Kyle Busch Motorsports	18	Harrison Burton	Wes Ward	1
Toyota	Wauters Motorsports	18	Noah Gragson (Note: Entry was fielded in a collaboration with Kyle Busch Motorsports.)	Richie Wauters	2
Toyota	Wauters Motorsports	5	Korbin Forrister	Richie Wauters	1
Chevrolet 2 Toyota 2	Braun Motorsports	32	Justin Marks	Shannon Rursch	1
Chevrolet 2 Toyota 2	Braun Motorsports	32	Justin Haley	Shannon Rursch	3
Toyota 4 Chevrolet 1	Glenden Enterprises 4	78	Chris Fontaine	Kevin Ingram	4 (Note: Entry was fielded in a collaboration with B. J. McLeod Motorsports.)
Toyota 4 Chevrolet 1	B. J. McLeod Motorsports 1	78	Tommy Regan	Kevyn Rebolledo	1
Chevrolet 2 Toyota 5	Henderson Motorsports	75	Caleb Holman	Chris Carrier	6
Chevrolet 2 Toyota 5	Henderson Motorsports	75	Parker Kligerman	Chris Carrier	1
Chevrolet 7 Ram 1	Mike Harmon Racing	74	Mike Harmon	Carl Brown 2 Mike Harmon 1 Kris Bradley 1 Robert Scott 1	4
Chevrolet 7 Ram 1	Mike Harmon Racing	74	Tim Viens	Carl Brown 2 Mike Harmon 1 Kris Bradley 1 Robert Scott 1	2
Chevrolet 7 Ram 1	Mike Harmon Racing	74	Paige Decker	Carl Brown 2 Mike Harmon 1 Kris Bradley 1 Robert Scott 1	1
Chevrolet 7 Ram 1	Mike Harmon Racing	74	Jordan Anderson	Carl Brown 2 Mike Harmon 1 Kris Bradley 1 Robert Scott 1	1
Chevrolet 1 Ram 1	Faith Motorsports	74	Donnie Levister	Carlos Contreras 1 Todd Myers 1	2 (Note: Entries were fielded in a collaboration with Mike Harmon Racing.)
Toyota	Faith Motorsports	62	Donnie Levister	Carlos Contreras	2

=== Changes ===
==== Teams ====
- JR Motorsports will run full-time with Cole Custer in the No. 00 Haas Automation Chevrolet Silverado after running part-time in 2015 because of age limitations. (The team made sporadic starts with Sprint Cup regulars in 2015 in preparation for 2016 at selected longer tracks.)
- ThorSport Racing will field a fourth full-time team with Ben Rhodes driving the No. 41 with a sponsorship from Alpha Energy. Rhodes raced part-time in the Xfinity Series for JR Motorsports in 2015.
- GMS Racing will field a third full-time team, with Johnny Sauter driving the No. 21 Chevrolet Silverado, after racing with ThorSport Racing for seven years from 2009-2015.
- NTS Motorsports will shut down its full-time team and just run part-time.
- Austin Wayne Self and team AM Racing will move up from the ARCA racing series in the No. 22.
- Martins Motorsports will field a full-time team with Tommy Joe Martins in the No. 44. The team purchased the owner points and some trucks of the 2015 Billy Boat Motorsports No. 15. Billy Boat Motorsports will shut down.
- Bolen Motorsports will field a full-time team with Jordan Anderson in the No. 66.
- SS-Green Light Racing will shut down the No. 08 team.
- Carlos Contreras and brother Enrique Contreras will form Contreras Motorsports and field a full-time team with various drivers in the No. 71 Truck.
- Hattori Racing Enterprises will attempt to run the full season with Ryan Truex.
- Ranier Racing with MDM will field a part-time team with Brandon Jones in the No. 99 Chevrolet. The team switched to the No. 71 in order to make the races due to rain threats.

==== Drivers ====
- Brad Keselowski Racing announced Daniel Hemric joins the team to drive the #19 Ford F-150 in 2016, ending a tenure with NTS Motorsports after one year in 2015. The truck was driven by Tyler Reddick in 2015. He'll switch from the No. 19 truck to the No. 29 truck in 2016.
- Kyle Busch Motorsports announced they will field three full-time trucks with William Byron and sponsor Liberty University in the No. 9, Christopher Bell and sponsor JBL in the No. 4 and Daniel Suárez with Arris sponsorship and Cody Coughlin with Jegs Performance Parts running at least 10 races each in the No. 51. Coughlin will drive the No. 18 truck at Daytona while Suárez drives the No. 51. 2015 NASCAR Camping World Truck Series champion Erik Jones ran full-time in 2015 in one truck, with multiple drivers in the other two trucks.
- Grant Enfinger and Kaz Grala will move up from the ARCA series to drive the No. 33 Chevrolet Silverado in 2016. The Truck was driven by multiple drivers in 2015.
- Rico Abreu will replace Johnny Sauter in the ThorSport Racing No. 98. Abreu competed in the K&N Pro Series East series in 2015.
- Timmy Hill will run full-time for Premium Motorsports in the No. 49 (renumbered from No. 94). Hill ran 12 races in this truck in 2015.
- Travis Kvapil will run full-time for MAKE Motorsports in the No. 50. Kvapil ran 20 races for between the two MAKE trucks in 2015.
- Ben Kennedy and Red Horse Racing parted ways after three races.

==== Crew chiefs ====
- Brad Keselowski Racing will swap the crew chiefs of its two trucks, with Doug Randolph following Tyler Reddick to the No. 29 and Chad Kendrick moving to the No. 19.
- Shane Huffman will crew chief the No. 17 Truck, driven by Timothy Peters. He was the crew chief of the GMS Racing No. 33 in 2015.
- Marcus Richmond will crew chief the new No. 21 Truck, driven by Johnny Sauter. He was the crew chief for Red Horse Racing's No. 17, driven by Timothy Peters in 2015.
- Jeff Hensley will crew chief the No. 23 Truck, driven by Spencer Gallagher. He was the crew chief for ThorSport Racing's No. 13, driven by Cameron Hayley in 2015.
- Jeff Stankiewicz will crew chief the No. 33 Truck, driven by Grant Enfinger. He was the crew chief for Spencer Gallagher's No. 23 in 2015.
- Kevin Bellicourt will crew chief the No. 41 Truck, driven by Ben Rhodes. He was the crew chief for K&N Pro Series East Champion William Byron in 2015.
- Kevin Manion will crew chief the No. 51 truck driven by Daniel Suárez and Cody Coughlin. He was the crew chief for Richard Petty Motorsports No. 9 Sprint Cup team in 2015.
- Ryan Fugle will crew chief the No. 9 truck driven by William Byron. He was the crew chief for 2015 champion Erik Jones in 2015.
- Jerry Baxter will crew chief the No. 4 truck driven by Christopher Bell. He was the crew chief for the No. 51 in 2015.
- Eddie Troconis will crew chief the No. 13 truck driven by Cameron Hayley. He was the engineer for 2015 champion Erik Jones in 2015.

== Rule changes ==
The 2016 Camping World Truck Series season introduced several major changes:

- A "caution clock" rule was in effect during all races, excluding the Eldora Dirt Derby due to its format. Under this system, a competition caution was thrown after twenty consecutive minutes of green flag racing. No free pass was awarded on these cautions, and the clock is reset upon all restarts. The clock was turned off during the final laps of the race (10 on Pocono and Mosport, 20 on all other tracks). The caution clock rule was replaced the following year with a new stage system, adopted by all three of NASCAR's national series.
- A playoff format similar to the Chase for the Cup used in the Sprint Cup Series was adopted.
- Truck Series director Elton Sawyer also announced the availability of crate engines, known as the "Delta Engine", for teams to use starting with the Charlotte race.

== Schedule ==
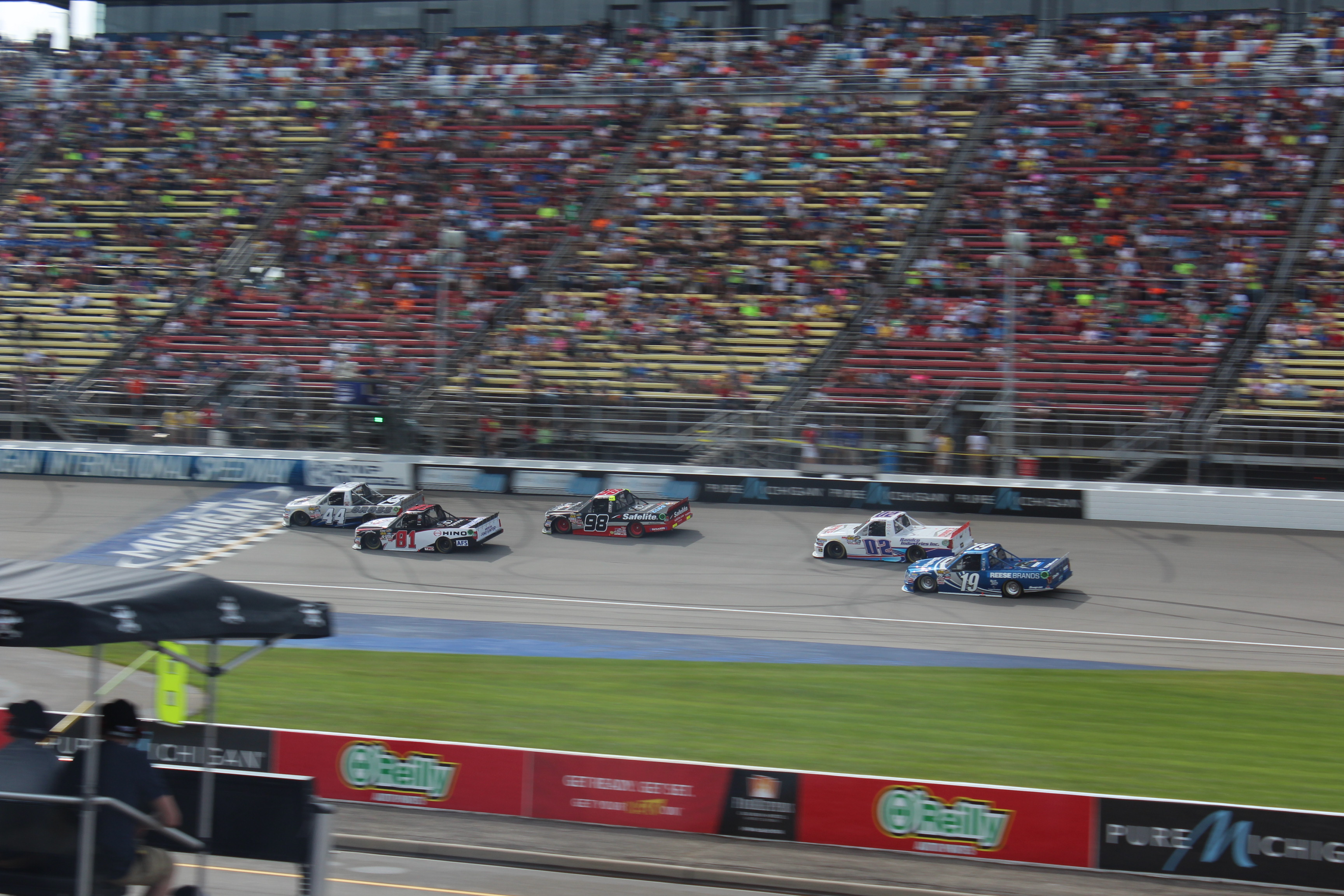
The Careers for Veterans 200 at Michigan International Speedway in August

FS1 televised every race except Talladega, which aired on Fox. Due to programming overrun, coverage of Iowa started on Fox Business Network, while Michigan aired on FS2.

No	Race title	Track	Location	Date
1	NextEra Energy Resources 250	Daytona International Speedway	Daytona Beach, Florida	February 19
2	Great Clips 200	Atlanta Motor Speedway	Hampton, Georgia	February 27
3	Alpha Energy Solutions 250	Martinsville Speedway	Ridgeway, Virginia	April 2
4	Toyota Tundra 250	Kansas Speedway	Kansas City, Kansas	May 6
5	Jacob Companies 200	Dover International Speedway	Dover, Delaware	May 13
6	North Carolina Education Lottery 200	Charlotte Motor Speedway	Concord, North Carolina	May 21^{2}
7	Rattlesnake 400	Texas Motor Speedway	Fort Worth, Texas	June 10
8	Speediatrics 200	Iowa Speedway	Newton, Iowa	June 18
9	Drivin' for Linemen 200	Gateway Motorsports Park	Madison, Illinois	June 25
10	Buckle Up in Your Truck 225	Kentucky Speedway	Sparta, Kentucky	July 7
11	Aspen Dental Eldora Dirt Derby	Eldora Speedway	Allen Township, Darke County, Ohio	July 20
12	Pocono Mountains 150	Pocono Raceway	Long Pond, Pennsylvania	July 30
13	UNOH 200	Bristol Motor Speedway	Bristol, Tennessee	August 17
14	Careers for Veterans 200	Michigan International Speedway	Cambridge Township, Michigan	August 27
15	Chevrolet Silverado 250	Canadian Tire Motorsport Park, Bowmanville, Ontario	Clarington, Ontario, Canada	September 4
16	American Ethanol E15 225	Chicagoland Speedway	Joliet, Illinois	September 16
Chase for the NASCAR Camping World Truck Series
Round of 8
17	UNOH 175	New Hampshire Motor Speedway	Loudon, New Hampshire	September 24
18	DC Solar 350	Las Vegas Motor Speedway	Las Vegas, Nevada	October 1
19	Fred's 250	Talladega Superspeedway	Lincoln, Alabama	October 22
Round of 6
20	Texas Roadhouse 200	Martinsville Speedway	Martinsville, Virginia	October 29
21	Striping Technology 350	Texas Motor Speedway	Fort Worth, Texas	November 4
22	Lucas Oil 150	Phoenix International Raceway	Avondale, Arizona	November 11
Championship 4
23	Ford EcoBoost 200	Homestead–Miami Speedway	Homestead, Florida	November 18

== Results and standings ==
=== Races ===
No.	Race	Pole position	Most laps led	Winning driver	Manufacturer
1	NextEra Energy Resources 250	Grant Enfinger	Austin Theriault	Johnny Sauter	Chevrolet
2	Great Clips 200	Matt Crafton	Matt Crafton	John Hunter Nemechek	Chevrolet
3	Alpha Energy Solutions 250	Ben Rhodes	Kyle Busch	Kyle Busch	Toyota
4	Toyota Tundra 250	John Wes Townley	Matt Crafton	William Byron	Toyota
5	Jacob Companies 200	William Byron	William Byron	Matt Crafton	Toyota
6	North Carolina Education Lottery 200	William Byron	Matt Crafton	Matt Crafton	Toyota
7	Rattlesnake 400	Johnny Sauter	Matt Crafton	William Byron	Toyota
8	Speediatrics 200	John Hunter Nemechek	William Byron	William Byron	Toyota
9	Drivin' for Linemen 200	Ben Rhodes	William Byron	Christopher Bell	Toyota
10	Buckle Up in Your Truck 225	Daniel Suárez	William Byron	William Byron	Toyota
11	Aspen Dental Eldora Dirt Derby	Caleb Holman	Bobby Pierce	Kyle Larson	Chevrolet
12	Pocono Mountains 150	William Byron	William Byron	William Byron	Toyota
13	UNOH 200	Tyler Reddick	Christopher Bell	Ben Kennedy	Chevrolet
14	Careers for Veterans 200	John Wes Townley	Timothy Peters	Brett Moffitt	Toyota
15	Chevrolet Silverado 250	Cole Custer	Cole Custer	John Hunter Nemechek	Chevrolet
16	American Ethanol E15 225	Spencer Gallagher	Kyle Busch	Kyle Busch	Toyota
Chase for the NASCAR Camping World Truck Series
Round of 8
17	UNOH 175	William Byron	William Byron	William Byron	Toyota
18	DC Solar 350	Timothy Peters	Tyler Reddick	Tyler Reddick	Ford
19	Fred's 250	Cole Custer	Grant Enfinger	Grant Enfinger	Chevrolet
Round of 6
20	Texas Roadhouse 200	Chase Elliott	Chase Elliott	Johnny Sauter	Chevrolet
21	Striping Technology 350	Spencer Gallagher	Spencer Gallagher	Johnny Sauter	Chevrolet
22	Lucas Oil 150	William Byron	William Byron	Daniel Suárez	Toyota
Championship 4
23	Ford EcoBoost 200	William Byron	Kyle Larson	William Byron	Toyota

=== Drivers' Championship ===
(key) Bold – Pole position awarded by time. Italics – Pole position set by final practice results or owner's points. * – Most laps led.

. – Eliminated after Round of 8 . – Eliminated after Round of 6

Pos	Driver	DAY	ATL	MAR	KAN	DOV	CLT	TEX	IOW	GTW	KEN	ELD	POC	BRI	MCH	MSP	CHI	NHA	LVS	TAL	MAR	TEX	PHO	HOM	Pts
1	Johnny Sauter	1	28	32	16	4	3	**3**	10	4	5	13	8	5	9	7	5	10	7	7	1	1	2	3	4030
2	Matt Crafton	10	**30***	7	2*	1	1*	2*	8	27	8	10	12	32	7	4	27	3	8	22	17	2	3	7	4026
3	Christopher Bell **(R)**	16	26	19	4	3	8	32	9	1	4	2	10	7*	24	5	4	2	6	6	4	11	7	8	4025
4	Timothy Peters	15	3	5	8	14	7	6	11	10	9	27	4	13	2*	18	8	5	**9**	3	5	14	5	9	4024
Chase for the NASCAR Camping World Truck Series cut-off
Pos	Driver	DAY	ATL	MAR	KAN	DOV	CLT	TEX	IOW	GTW	KEN	ELD	POC	BRI	MCH	MSP	CHI	NHA	LVS	TAL	MAR	TEX	PHO	HOM	Pts
5	William Byron **(R)**	13	32	3	1	11*	10	1	1*	17*	1*	14	1*	4	4	10	30	**1***	5	10	8	6	**27***	**1**	2199
6	Daniel Hemric	8	4	22	3	9	9	10	15	3	3	8	22	3	3	3	2	28	2	11	9	3	13	5	2163
7	Ben Kennedy	23	15	11	9	13	14	4	7	9	22	11	7	1	11	8	26	11	4	5	18	13	9	14	2162
8	John Hunter Nemechek	17	1	2	28	15	12	7	**12**	6	2	24	9	8	26	1	14	9	16	32	3	18	6	11	2133
9	Tyler Reddick	18	14	20	13	7	4	5	5	25	10	5	26	**14**	19	6	10	4	1*	26	13	4	12	2	511
10	Cole Custer **(R)**	24	17	29	7	5	13	14	2	15	14	6	5	6	22	**2***	9	6	3	**29**	7	9	10	10	502
11	Cameron Hayley	25	2	9	19	19	15	18	3	24	6	7	2	24	5	9	3	19	18	19	11	10	4	16	476
12	Spencer Gallagher	21	10	6	10	6	6	27	13	22	16	29	15	12	25	22	**7**	14	11	2	29	**7***	32	21	402
13	Rico Abreu **(R)**	29	11	10	22	22	20	9	18	14	15	3	6	26	13	27	19	17	20	4	24	12	11	13	395
14	Ben Rhodes **(R)**	7	6	**16**	18	28	17	11	4	2	13	23	11	30	6	30	25	15	12	24	19	15	14	20	387
15	Austin Wayne Self **(R)**	19	16	15	25	32	21	13	16	28	27	9	25	21	16	15	17	29	21	14		22	22	25	279
16	Travis Kvapil	5	23	DNQ	20	23	30	24	27	12	25	17	16	25	18	25	21	18	24	13	27	27	23	27	257
17	John Wes Townley	26	7	21	**26**	29	16	17	19	23			29	10	**12**	12	20	12	13	28	21				255
18	Ryan Truex	2	20	12	6	8	22			26					23	21	15	16		8	14	21		32	250
19	Tyler Young	6	13	13	11	21	19	21		13		20			10	28	16		23			26			222
20	Jordan Anderson	30	DNQ	DNQ	29	18	24	22	20	11	17	32	14	16	14	13	23	22				25	29	24	212
21	Matt Tifft **(R)**				14	12	5										12		15	9	16	17	8	12	211
22	Grant Enfinger **(R)**	**20**	5								12				8		6		10	1*				23	185
23	Tommy Joe Martins	32	25	QL	32	24	25	25	30	18	26		17	31	15	19	24	21	22	16	25	31	30	DNQ	176
24	Parker Kligerman	3	8	8	31	27	18	20	31		19			20					14	DNQ					164
25	Brandon Brown	4	19	14	12	31	26		24	32	20	22	24	23						25					153
26	Austin Hill	DNQ	12			17	DNQ	15			18		31	19				30			10	19		17	142
27	Brett Moffitt										31		3	2	1	16		8							141
28	Kaz Grala			31		10			29	8			11			26		7			15		28		132
29	Cody Coughlin **(R)**	31			27			12				19	13		20			20	17	31		28			113
30	Jennifer Jo Cobb	DNQ	29		24	30	28	DNQ	28	29	24	26	28		17	24	22	25	27	DNQ		30	24	DNQ	113
31	Germán Quiroga							8	14	7															70
32	Caleb Holman		9				DNQ	16	26			**30**		15											69
33	Stewart Friesen											28		22				13	19				18	29	69
34	Timmy Hill	14	21	24	21		31				23														65
35	Jesse Little						DNQ	19						17			29					20		18	62
36	Austin Cindric					DNQ								18		23				20			15		56
37	Norm Benning	DNQ	DNQ	DNQ	DNQ	DNQ		DNQ			28	DNQ	23		27	20	31		26			32	26	DNQ	51
38	Shane Lee			17						16												16			50
39	Jake Griffin								21	30		4		DNQ											44
40	Noah Gragson																						16	15	35
41	Bobby Pierce				23	26	27					25*													33
42	Matt Mills													27				23				29	21		32
43	Wayne Edwards							23				18							28						30
44	Nick Drake					16			23																27
45	Brady Boswell											21												19	26
46	Mike Bliss			30	17			28																	24
47	Justin Haley			26						21						29									23
48	Bryce Napier			23										28									25		23
49	Michel Disdier	11																							22
50	Gary Klutt															11									22
51	Spencer Boyd			28						19														30	22
52	Ken Schrader											12													21
53	Austin Theriault	27*					DNQ														20				21
54	Chris Fontaine	22		DNQ								DNQ								23					21
55	Casey Smith								22												DNQ	23			21
56	J. R. Heffner											15													18
57	Enrique Contreras III									20					28										18
58	Sheldon Creed											16													17
59	Carlos Contreras	DNQ	27					31					27						30						17
60	Myatt Snider																						17		16
61	Kevin Donahue																				30		20		16
62	Alon Day																	24						26	16
63	Tim Viens							29										26	29						15
64	Kyle Martel												19												14
65	Caleb Roark									31	32	DNQ	32		30	32	32	32	31						12
66	Harrison Burton																				22				11
67	C. J. Faison					25																			8
68	Derek Scott Jr.								25																8
69	Ryan Lynch							26																	7
70	Justin Fontaine																				26				7
71	Korbin Forrister	DNQ	DNQ									DNQ								27					6
72	Josh Reeves																				28				5
73	Justin Shipley											31													2
74	Akinori Ogata																	31							2
75	Kyle Donahue																				31				2
76	Dominique Van Wieringen																						31		2
77	Patrick Staropoli																							31	2
78	Andy Seuss						32																		1
79	Josh White																				32				1
	Sean Corr											DNQ	30^{1}												0
	Clay Greenfield	DNQ												DNQ						DNQ					0
	Donnie Levister								DNQ			Wth		Wth							DNQ				0
	Tommy Regan																					DNQ	DNQ		0
	David Levine	DNQ																							0
	Natalie Decker			DNQ																					0
	Cody McMahan													DNQ											0
	Brad Foy																				DNQ				0
	Kyle Soper																				DNQ				0
Ineligible for Camping World Truck championship points
Pos	Driver	DAY	ATL	MAR	KAN	DOV	CLT	TEX	IOW	GTW	KEN	ELD	POC	BRI	MCH	MSP	CHI	NHA	LVS	TAL	MAR	TEX	PHO	HOM	Pts
	Kyle Busch			1*			2				30						1*								
	Daniel Suárez	28	31	18		2	23		6		**11**			29			11				6	5	1	6	
	Kyle Larson			4								1												4*	
	Chase Elliott																				**2***				
	Clint Bowyer				5																				
	Erik Jones									5															
	Brandon Jones					20	11		17		7			9											
	Austin Dillon																					8			
	Scott Lagasse Jr.	9																						22	
	Bobby Gerhart	12																		17					
	Dylan Lupton																			12			19		
	Cole Whitt																				12				
	Josh Berry																13								
	D. J. Kennington															14					23				
	B. J. McLeod				15																				
	Ross Chastain																			15					
	Cody Ware															17				21					
	Reed Sorenson	DNQ											18		21		28			18		24		28	
	Garrett Smithley		18				29				21														
	Ray Black Jr.																18								
	Ryan Ellis	DNQ	DNQ		30			30					20		31^{1}					DNQ		DNQ			
	Todd Peck												21		29				25						
	Justin Marks		22																						
	J. J. Yeley		24																						
	Paige Decker			25																					
	Claire Decker			27					32																
	Josh Wise																	27							
	Mike Harmon	DNQ			DNQ						29^{1}											DNQ			
	Brandon Hightower																			30					
	Camden Murphy															31									
	Ryan Reed	DNQ																							
Pos	Driver	DAY	ATL	MAR	KAN	DOV	CLT	TEX	IOW	GTW	KEN	ELD	POC	BRI	MCH	MSP	CHI	NHA	LVS	TAL	MAR	TEX	PHO	HOM	Pts
^{1} Post entry, driver and owner did not score points.

=== Owners' championship (Top 15) ===
(key) Bold - Pole position awarded by time. Italics - Pole position set by final practice results or rainout. * – Most laps led.
. – Eliminated after Round of 8 . – Eliminated after Round of 6

Pos	No.	Car Owner	DAY	ATL	MAR	KAN	DOV	CLT	TEX	IOW	GTW	KEN	ELD	POC	BRI	MCH	MSP	CHI	NHA	LVS	TAL	MAR	TEX	PHO	HOM	Points
1	9	Kyle Busch	13	32	3	1	11*	10	1	1*	17*	1*	14	1*	4	4	10	30	**1***	5	10	8	6	**27***	**1**	4032
2	21	Maurice J. Gallagher Jr.	1	28	32	16	4	3	**3**	10	4	5	13	8	5	9	7	5	10	7	7	1	1	2	3	4030
3	88	Rhonda Thorson	10	**30***	7	2*	1	1*	2*	8	27	8	10	12	32	7	4	27	3	8	22	17	2	3	7	4026
4	4	Kyle Busch	16	26	19	4	3	8	32	9	1	4	2	10	7*	24	5	4	2	6	6	4	11	7	8	4025
Chase for the NASCAR Camping World Truck Series cut-off
5	19	Brad Keselowski	8	4	22	3	9	9	10	15	3	3	8	22	3	3	3	2	28	2	11	9	3	13	5	2163
6	33	Maurice J. Gallagher Jr.	**20**	5	31	9	10	14	4	7	9	22	11	7	1	11	8	26	11	4	5	18	13	9	14	2162
7	11	Tom Deloach	23	15	11	14	12	5	8	14	7	31	4	3	2	1	16	12	8	15	9	16	17	8	12	2150
8	8	Joe Nemechek	17	1	2	28	15	12	7	**12**	6	2	24	9	8	26	1	14	9	16	32	3	18	6	11	2133
9	17	Tom Deloach	15	3	5	8	14	7	6	11	10	9	27	4	13	2*	18	8	5	**9**	3	5	14	5	9	558
10	29	Brad Keselowski	18	14	20	13	7	4	5	5	25	10	5	26	**14**	19	6	10	4	1*	26	13	4	12	2	511
11	00	Dale Earnhardt Jr.	24	17	29	7	5	13	14	2	15	14	6	5	6	22	**2***	9	6	3	**29**	7	9	10	10	502
12	13	Duke Thorson	25	2	9	19	19	15	18	3	24	6	7	2	24	5	9	3	19	18	19	11	10	4	16	476
13	51	Kyle Busch	28	31	18	27	2	23	12	6	5	**11**	19	13	29	20	11	11	20	17	31	6	5	1	6	406
14	24	Maurice J. Gallagher Jr.			4	5	13			29	8	12	1		11	8	26	6	7	10	1*	15	16	26	4*	402
15	23	Maurice J. Gallagher Jr.	21	10	6	10	6	6	27	13	22	16	29	15	12	25	22	**7**	14	11	2	29	**7***	32	21	402
Pos	No.	Car Owner	DAY	ATL	MAR	KAN	DOV	CLT	TEX	IOW	GTW	KEN	ELD	POC	BRI	MCH	MSP	CHI	NHA	LVS	TAL	MAR	TEX	PHO	HOM	Points

=== Manufacturers' championship ===
Pos	Manufacturer	Wins	Points
1	Toyota	14	787
2	Chevrolet	8	732
3	Ford	1	647
4	Ram^{3}	0	8

== See also ==
- 2016 NASCAR Sprint Cup Series
- 2016 NASCAR Xfinity Series
- 2016 NASCAR K&N Pro Series East
- 2016 NASCAR K&N Pro Series West
- 2016 NASCAR Whelen Modified Tour
- 2016 NASCAR Whelen Southern Modified Tour
- 2016 NASCAR Pinty's Series
- 2016 NASCAR Whelen Euro Series

== Notes ==
- ^1Tommy Joe Martins qualified the No. 44 truck for the race, but crashed in qualifying. He contacted Austin Wayne Self and the No. 22 team, who initially didn't make the race, to run with the No. 44 but in Self's (Toyota) truck.
- ^2The race at Charlotte Motor Speedway was postponed from May 20 to May 21 because of inclement weather.
- ^3Because of chassis and body regulations, Ram is only eligible to race at circuits 1.25 miles or shorter (except Dover) and road courses that use the previous-generation body. Fiat last submitted a truck in the 2012 season, before the current generation body used at longer tracks was used.
