= Kevin Manion =

NASCAR crew chief (born 1972)

Personal information
- Full name: Kevin Raymond Manion
- Nickname: Bono
- Born: June 24, 1972 (age 54) Boylston, Massachusetts, U.S.

Sport
- Country: United States
- Sport: NASCAR Craftsman Truck Series
- Team: No. 71 Spire Motorsports

Kevin Raymond Manion (born June 24, 1972), nicknamed Bono, is an American NASCAR crew chief for Spire Motorsports in the NASCAR Craftsman Truck Series. He is a two-time consecutive NASCAR Xfinity Series championship-winning crew chief and the 2010 Daytona 500 and 2010 Brickyard 400-winning crew chief.

== Early life ==
Manion was born in Boylston, Massachusetts. He helped Bobby Fuller in the NASCAR Winston Modified Series at the age of 14. His first job was cleaning the car plus general mechanic work. Eventually he was promoted to tire changer. Between 1988 and 1992 he worked as a crew chief for Chris Woods on Late Models at Riverside Park in Agawam, Massachusetts.

Manion became the crew chief at Sheba Racing in Hudson, Massachusetts in 1993. His team worked a Modified car for Jeff Fuller and Steve Park. Tommy Baldwin Jr. became the crew chief in 1993 and Manion became his main man. Steve Park, the team's driver, missed the 1993 championship by just three points.

== NASCAR career ==
In 1995, Manion and friend Tommy Baldwin, moved to North Carolina to further their racing career landing the job of general mechanics for the 41 car of Larry Hedrick Motorsports. The team had Ricky Craven as the driver and a crew chief of Charley Pressley. During this time, Manion and Baldwin shared a house and were later, in 1997, joined by Steve Park. Park's move coincided with his becoming the driver of the No. 3 Nationwide Series car owned by Dale and Teresa Earnhardt. Manion would join Dale Earnhardt Inc. shortly after Park's move.

=== Cup Series ===
Manion became the crew chief of the No. 1 Chevrolet in Sprint Cup but later he was specially selected by Dale Earnhardt Jr. and Teresa Earnhardt to head the newly formed Chance 2 Motorsports team in the Busch Series. That team proceeded to win two championships, 12 victories with Martin Truex Jr. and three with Earnhardt Jr. Manion went on to receive the Crew Chief of the Year award.

In 2006, Manion began leading the No. 1 team in the Cup Series. In 2007, with Truex driving, the team claimed their first Pole Award, seven top-five finishes, 14 top-tens and their first Cup win at Dover International Speedway. The win secured Manion's team in the 2007 Chase for the Cup, eventually finishing 11th in points. The team finished 15th in the points for the 2008 season with three top-five finishes and 11 top-tens.

When Truex left for Michael Waltrip Racing in 2010, Jamie McMurray replaced him as the driver of the Earnhardt Ganassi Racing No. 1 car (DEI had merged with Chip Ganassi Racing in 2009) and Manion remained the crew chief. He and McMurray won the 2010 Daytona 500 and the 2010 Brickyard 400 together.

Manion later joined Tommy Baldwin Racing, working with Alex Bowman's No. 7, though on May 5, 2015, he joined Richard Petty Motorsports as Sam Hornish Jr.'s crew chief on the No. 9. On December 10, Manion announced that he had left RPM.

=== Truck Series ===
On January 6, 2016, it was announced Manion would become crew chief for a Kyle Busch Motorsports truck shared by Daniel Suárez and Cody Coughlin in the Camping World Truck Series.

Manion served as the crew chief for DGR-Crosley's No. 54 truck in 2018, which was fielded for Bo LeMastus, Justin Marks, Kyle Benjamin, and Chris Eggleston. In 2019, he worked with DGR-Crosley's Tyler Ankrum and the No. 17 team as they qualified for the Truck Series playoffs.

==== GMS Racing: 2020-2021 ====
In 2020, Manion moved to GMS Racing to become crew chief for Zane Smith on the No. 21. The team change also reunited him with Ankrum, who joined GMS' No. 26. Smith and Manion both returned for a second year in 2021 and won at Martinsville in October to clinch a spot in the Championship 4, where they would finish second in the standings.

==== Spire Motorsports: 2022 ====
On November 23, 2021, it was announced that Manion would be leaving GMS to be the crew chief for Spire Motorsports in their expansion into the Truck Series.

==== Rev Racing: 2024 ====
On January 16, 2024, it was announced that Manion would be leaving GMS to be the crew chief for Rev Racing for their No. 2 driven by Nick Sanchez. Sanchez and Manion would make it to the playoffs but would get eliminated at Martinsville.

==== Return to Spire: 2025 ====
On January 27, 2025, it was announced that Manion would leave Rev after one year to be the crew chief for Spire in their No. 71.

=== Other ventures ===
In 2011, Manion fielded a Whelen Modified Tour car for Ryan Newman to run at New Hampshire International Speedway. Newman won the race, but the car's intake manifold did not conform to NASCAR specification. Newman was later stripped of his win. Manion and crew chief Mike LaRochelle were suspended from NASCAR regional touring series events for the remainder of 2011. The win was awarded to Modified Series staple Todd Szegedy.
