= NASCAR Gander Outdoors Truck Series at Iowa Speedway =

NASCAR truck series race at Iowa Speedway

NASCAR Gander Outdoors Truck Series
- Venue: Iowa Speedway
- Location: Newton, Iowa, United States

Circuit information
- Surface: Asphalt
- Length: 0.875 mi (1.408 km)
- Turns: 4

Pickup truck racing events in the NASCAR Gander Outdoors Truck Series have been held at Iowa Speedway in Newton, Iowa, during numerous seasons and times of year from 2009 to 2019.

== Summer race ==
M&M's 200

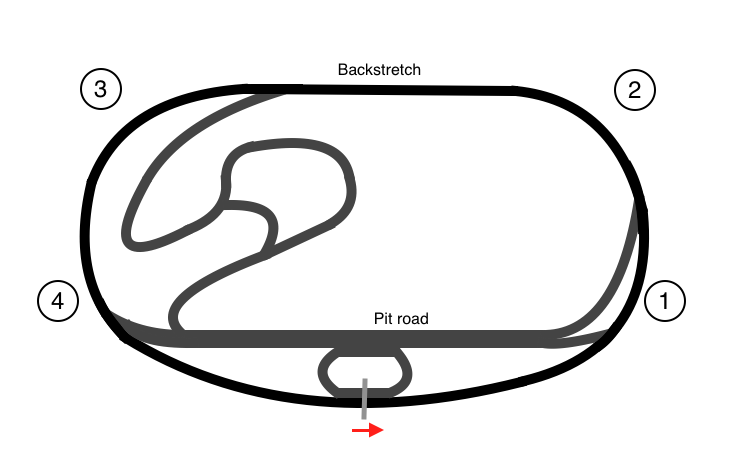
- First race: 2009
- Last race: 2019
- Distance: 175 miles (281.635 km)
- Laps: 200; Stages 1/2: 60; Final stage: 80
- Previous names: Lucas Oil 200 (2009–2010); Coca-Cola 200 (2011); American Ethanol 200 (2012); American Ethanol 200 Presented by Enogen (2013–2015); Speediatrics 200 (2016)
- Most wins (driver): Erik Jones; Timothy Peters; Brett Moffitt (2)
- Most wins (team): Kyle Busch Motorsports (3)
- Most wins (manufacturer): Toyota (7)

The M&M's 200 presented by Casey's General Stores was a 200-lap NASCAR Gander RV & Outdoors Truck Series race held at Iowa Speedway in Newton, Iowa. The race ran from 2009 to 2019 before being canceled in 2020 due to the COVID-19 pandemic and removed entirely from the schedule in 2021.

=== Past winners ===
Year	Date	No.	Driver	Team	Manufacturer	Race Distance		Race Time	Average Speed (mph)	Report	Ref
Year	Date	No.	Driver	Team	Manufacturer	Laps	Miles (km)	Race Time	Average Speed (mph)	Report	Ref
2009	September 5	5	Mike Skinner	Randy Moss Motorsports	Toyota	200	175 (281.635)	1:45:52	99.181	Report	
2010	July 11	3	Austin Dillon	Richard Childress Racing	Chevrolet	205*	179.375 (288.676)	1:55:46	92.967	Report	
2011	July 16	88	Matt Crafton	ThorSport Racing	Chevrolet	200	175 (281.635)	1:46:08	98.932	Report	
2012	July 14	17	Timothy Peters	Red Horse Racing	Toyota	200	175 (281.635)	1:48:54	96.419	Report	
2013	July 13	17	Timothy Peters	Red Horse Racing	Toyota	200	175 (281.635)	1:38:46	106.311	Report	
2014	July 11	51	Erik Jones	Kyle Busch Motorsports	Toyota	200	175 (281.635)	1:35:05	110.429	Report	
2015	June 19	4	Erik Jones	Kyle Busch Motorsports	Toyota	200	175 (281.635)	1:48:33	96.730	Report	
2016	June 18	9	William Byron	Kyle Busch Motorsports	Toyota	200	175 (281.635)	1:53:16	92.702	Report	
2017	June 23	8	John Hunter Nemechek	NEMCO Motorsports	Chevrolet	200	175 (281.635)	1:47:42	97.493	Report	
2018	June 16	16	Brett Moffitt	Hattori Racing Enterprises	Toyota	200	175 (281.635)	1:56:45	89.936	Report	
2019*	June 16*	24	Brett Moffitt*	GMS Racing	Chevrolet	200	175 (281.635)	1:40:18	104.686	Report	
2020*	Not held										

- 2010: The race extended due to a NASCAR Overtime finish.
- 2019: Race postponed from Saturday night to Sunday afternoon due to rain; Ross Chastain had originally won the race, but his truck failed post-race tech. With NASCAR's new tech policy that if the winning vehicle fails, the vehicle will be disqualified and whoever finished 2nd or is the highest finishing driver whose vehicle passes moves up. Brett Moffitt originally finished 2nd in the race, but due to Chastain's truck failing, and Moffitt passing post-race tech, Moffitt wound up winning the race despite the fact he never led a lap the whole race. This marked the first time since an Xfinity race in 1995 that a driver was disqualified due to post-race tech failure, and stripped of the win.
- 2020: Race canceled and moved to the Daytona Road Course due to the COVID-19 pandemic.

==== Multiple winners (drivers) ====
# Wins	Driver	Years won
2	Timothy Peters	2012, 2013
2	Erik Jones	2014, 2015
2	Brett Moffitt	2018, 2019

==== Multiple winners (teams) ====
# Wins	Team	Years won
3	Kyle Busch Motorsports	2014, 2015, 2016
2	Red Horse Racing	2012, 2013

==== Manufacturer wins ====
# Wins	Make	Years won
7	(Japan) Toyota	2009, 2012, 2013, 2014, 2015, 2016, 2018
4	(United States) Chevrolet	2010, 2011, 2017, 2019

== Fall race ==
Fan Appreciation 200
- First race: 2012
- Last race: 2013
- Distance: 175 miles (281.635 km)
- Laps: 200
- Previous names: American Ethanol 200 (2012)

The Fan Appreciation 200 was a 200 lap NASCAR Camping World Truck Series race held at Iowa Speedway in Newton, Iowa. The second race held at Iowa Speedway, it originally shared a name and title sponsor with its sister race, the American Ethanol 200, in Newton. Ryan Blaney, son of Cup driver Dave Blaney won the inaugural race by holding off Ty Dillon. Blaney's win at the age of 18 years, 8 months, and 15 days made him the youngest winner in Camping World Truck Series history at the time. The race was removed from the schedule after the 2013 season.

=== Past winners ===
Year	Date	No.	Driver	Team	Manufacturer	Race Distance		Race Time	Average Speed (mph)	Report	Ref
Year	Date	No.	Driver	Team	Manufacturer	Laps	Miles (km)	Race Time	Average Speed (mph)	Report	Ref
2012	September 15	29	Ryan Blaney	Brad Keselowski Racing	RAM	200	175 (281.635)	1:58:56	88.285	Report	
2013	September 8	31	James Buescher	Turner Scott Motorsports	Chevrolet	212*	185.5 (298.533)	1:53:31	98.047	Report	

- 2013: Race extended because of two green–white–checker finish attempts.

==== Manufacturer wins ====
# Wins	Make	Years won	Ref
1	(United States) RAM	2012	
1	(United States) Chevrolet	2013	
