= 2016 UNOH 175 =

17th race of the 2016 NASCAR Camping World Truck Series

Race details
- Race 17 of 23 of the 2016 NASCAR Camping World Truck Series
- Date: September 24, 2016
- Official name: 19th Annual UNOH 175
- Location: New Hampshire Motor Speedway, Loudon, New Hampshire
- Course: Permanent racing facility
- Course length: 1.058 miles (1.703 km)
- Distance: 175 laps, 185 mi (297 km)
- Scheduled distance: 175 laps, 185 mi (297 km)
- Average speed: 95.343 mph (153.440 km/h)

Pole position
Driver	William Byron	Kyle Busch Motorsports
- Time: 28.667

Most laps led
Driver	William Byron	Kyle Busch Motorsports
- Laps: 161

Winner
No. 9	William Byron	Kyle Busch Motorsports

Television in the United States
- Network: FS1
- Announcers: Vince Welch, Phil Parsons, and Michael Waltrip

Radio in the United States
- Radio: MRN

The 2016 UNOH 175 was the 17th stock car race of the 2016 NASCAR Camping World Truck Series, the first race of the Round of 8, and the 19th iteration of the event. The race was held on Saturday, September 24, 2016, in Loudon, New Hampshire, at New Hampshire Motor Speedway, a 1.058-mile (1.703 km) permanent oval shaped racetrack. The race took the scheduled 175 laps to complete. William Byron, driving for Kyle Busch Motorsports, pulled off a dominating performance, leading 161 laps and earning his sixth career NASCAR Camping World Truck Series win. He would also earn a spot in the next round of the playoffs. To fill out the podium, Christopher Bell, driving for Kyle Busch Motorsports, and Matt Crafton, driving for ThorSport Racing, would finish 2nd and 3rd, respectively.

== Background ==
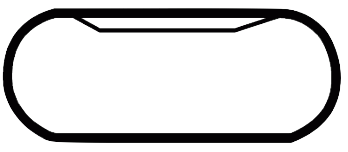
The layout of New Hampshire Motor Speedway, the venue where the race was held.

New Hampshire Motor Speedway is a 1.058-mile (1.703 km) oval speedway located in Loudon, New Hampshire, which has hosted NASCAR racing annually since 1990, as well as the longest-running motorcycle race in North America, the Loudon Classic. Nicknamed "The Magic Mile", the speedway is often converted into a 1.600-mile (2.575 km) road course, which includes much of the oval.

The track was originally the site of Bryar Motorsports Park before being purchased and redeveloped by Bob Bahre. The track is currently one of eight major NASCAR tracks owned and operated by Speedway Motorsports.

=== Entry list ===
- (R) denotes rookie driver.
- (i) denotes driver who is ineligible for series driver points.

#	Driver	Team	Make
00	Cole Custer (R)	JR Motorsports	Chevrolet
1	Jennifer Jo Cobb	Jennifer Jo Cobb Racing	Chevrolet
02	Austin Hill	Austin Hill Racing	Ford
4	Christopher Bell (R)	Kyle Busch Motorsports	Toyota
05	John Wes Townley (Note: Relieved by Matt DiBenedetto in practice.)	Athenian Motorsports	Chevrolet
07	Matt Mills	SS-Green Light Racing	Chevrolet
8	John Hunter Nemechek	NEMCO Motorsports	Chevrolet
9	William Byron (R)	Kyle Busch Motorsports	Toyota
10	Caleb Roark	Jennifer Jo Cobb Racing	Chevrolet
11	Brett Moffitt	Red Horse Racing	Toyota
13	Cameron Hayley	ThorSport Racing	Toyota
16	Stewart Friesen	Halmar Racing	Chevrolet
17	Timothy Peters	Red Horse Racing	Toyota
19	Daniel Hemric	Brad Keselowski Racing	Ford
21	Johnny Sauter	GMS Racing	Chevrolet
22	Austin Wayne Self (R)	AM Racing	Toyota
23	Spencer Gallagher	GMS Racing	Chevrolet
24	Kaz Grala	GMS Racing	Chevrolet
29	Tyler Reddick	Brad Keselowski Racing	Ford
33	Ben Kennedy	GMS Racing	Chevrolet
41	Ben Rhodes (R)	ThorSport Racing	Toyota
44	Tommy Joe Martins	Martins Motorsports	Chevrolet
49	Josh Wise (i)	Premium Motorsports	Chevrolet
50	Travis Kvapil	MAKE Motorsports	Chevrolet
51	Cody Coughlin (R)	Kyle Busch Motorsports	Toyota
63	Akinori Ogata	MB Motorsports	Chevrolet
66	Jordan Anderson	Bolen Motorsports	Chevrolet
71	Alon Day	Contreras Motorsports	Chevrolet
74	Tim Viens	Mike Harmon Racing	Chevrolet
81	Ryan Truex	Hattori Racing Enterprises	Toyota
88	Matt Crafton	ThorSport Racing	Toyota
98	Rico Abreu (R)	ThorSport Racing	Toyota
Official entry list

== Practice ==
=== First practice ===
The first practice session was held on Friday, September 23, at 1:30 am EST, and would last for 55 minutes. Ben Rhodes, driving for ThorSport Racing, would set the fastest time in the session, with a lap of 28.838, and an average speed of 132.076 mph (212.556 km/h).

Pos.	#	Driver	Team	Make	Time	Speed
1	41	Ben Rhodes (R)	ThorSport Racing	Toyota	28.838	132.076
2	9	William Byron (R)	Kyle Busch Motorsports	Toyota	28.896	131.811
3	4	Christopher Bell (R)	Kyle Busch Motorsports	Toyota	29.018	131.256
Full first practice results

=== Final practice ===
The final practice session was held on Friday, September 23, at 3:30 am EST, and would last for 55 minutes. Matt Crafton, driving for ThorSport Racing, would set the fastest time in the session, with a lap of 28.663, and an average speed of 132.882 mph (213.853 km/h).

Pos.	#	Driver	Team	Make	Time	Speed
1	88	Matt Crafton	ThorSport Racing	Toyota	28.663	132.882
2	41	Ben Rhodes (R)	ThorSport Racing	Toyota	28.703	132.697
3	9	William Byron (R)	Kyle Busch Motorsports	Toyota	28.706	132.683
Full final practice results

== Qualifying ==
Qualifying was held on Saturday, August 17, at 10:10 am EST. Since New Hampshire Motor Speedway is under 1.5 miles (2.4 km) in length, the qualifying system is a multi-car system that included three rounds. The first round was 15 minutes, where every driver would be able to set a lap within the 15 minutes. Then, the second round would consist of the fastest 24 cars in Round 1, and drivers would have 10 minutes to set a lap. Round 3 consisted of the fastest 12 drivers from Round 2, and the drivers would have 5 minutes to set a time. Whoever was fastest in Round 3 would win the pole.

William Byron, driving for Kyle Busch Motorsports, would score the pole for the race, with a lap of 28.667, and an average speed of 132.864 mph (213.824 km/h) in the third round.

=== Full qualifying results ===
Pos.	#	Driver	Team	Make	Time (R1)	Speed (R1)	Time (R2)	Speed (R2)	Time (R3)	Speed (R3)
1	9	William Byron (R)	Kyle Busch Motorsports	Toyota	29.196	130.456	28.951	131.560	28.667	132.864
2	17	Timothy Peters	Red Horse Racing	Toyota	29.334	129.843	28.937	131.624	28.773	132.374
3	4	Christopher Bell (R)	Kyle Busch Motorsports	Toyota	29.637	128.515	29.006	131.311	28.790	132.296
4	29	Tyler Reddick	Brad Keselowski Racing	Ford	29.687	128.299	28.838	132.076	28.942	131.601
5	41	Ben Rhodes (R)	ThorSport Racing	Toyota	28.981	131.424	28.974	131.456	28.955	131.542
6	11	Brett Moffitt	Red Horse Racing	Toyota	29.253	130.202	29.048	131.121	28.967	131.488
7	88	Matt Crafton	ThorSport Racing	Toyota	29.381	129.635	28.978	131.438	28.979	131.433
8	13	Cameron Hayley	ThorSport Racing	Toyota	29.552	128.885	29.113	130.828	28.991	131.379
9	24	Kaz Grala	GMS Racing	Chevrolet	29.153	130.649	29.047	131.125	29.023	131.234
10	21	Johnny Sauter	GMS Racing	Chevrolet	28.863	131.961	29.100	130.887	29.027	131.216
11	02	Austin Hill	Austin Hill Racing	Ford	29.372	129.675	29.094	130.914	29.106	130.860
12	33	Ben Kennedy	GMS Racing	Chevrolet	29.296	130.011	29.102	130.878	29.122	130.788
Eliminated in Round 2
13	19	Daniel Hemric	Brad Keselowski Racing	Ford	29.211	130.389	29.133	130.738	-	-
14	00	Cole Custer (R)	JR Motorsports	Chevrolet	29.093	130.918	29.147	130.676	-	-
15	8	John Hunter Nemechek	NEMCO Motorsports	Chevrolet	29.639	128.506	29.150	130.662	-	-
16	51	Cody Coughlin (R)	Kyle Busch Motorsports	Toyota	29.356	129.745	29.195	130.461	-	-
17	05	John Wes Townley	Athenian Motorsports	Chevrolet	29.579	128.767	29.278	130.091	-	-
18	23	Spencer Gallagher	GMS Racing	Chevrolet	29.381	129.635	29.295	130.015	-	-
19	16	Stewart Friesen	Halmar Racing	Chevrolet	29.301	129.989	29.364	129.710	-	-
20	81	Ryan Truex	Hattori Racing Enterprises	Toyota	29.893	127.414	29.421	129.459	-	-
21	98	Rico Abreu (R)	ThorSport Racing	Toyota	29.569	128.811	29.436	129.393	-	-
22	22	Austin Wayne Self (R)	AM Racing	Toyota	29.782	127.889	29.611	128.628	-	-
23	66	Jordan Anderson	Bolen Motorsports	Chevrolet	29.878	127.478	29.985	127.024	-	-
24	07	Matt Mills	SS-Green Light Racing	Chevrolet	29.872	127.504	30.189	126.165	-	-
Eliminated in Round 1
25	44	Tommy Joe Martins	Martins Motorsports	Chevrolet	29.982	127.036	-	-	-	-
26	49	Josh Wise (i)	Premium Motorsports	Chevrolet	29.989	127.007	-	-	-	-
27	71	Alon Day	Contreras Motorsports	Chevrolet	30.570	124.593	-	-	-	-
Qualified by owner's points
28	1	Jennifer Jo Cobb	Jennifer Jo Cobb Racing	Chevrolet	31.091	122.505	-	-	-	-
29	74	Tim Viens	Mike Harmon Racing	Chevrolet	31.931	119.282	-	-	-	-
30	10	Caleb Roark	Jennifer Jo Cobb Racing	Chevrolet	33.103	115.059	-	-	-	-
31	50	Travis Kvapil	MAKE Motorsports	Chevrolet	-	-	-	-	-	-
32	63	Akinori Ogata	MB Motorsports	Chevrolet	-	-	-	-	-	-
Official qualifying results
Official starting lineup

== Race results ==
Fin	#	Driver	Team	Make	Laps	Led	Status	Pts
1	9	William Byron (R)	Kyle Busch Motorsports	Toyota	175	161	Running	37
2	4	Christopher Bell (R)	Kyle Busch Motorsports	Toyota	175	11	Running	32
3	88	Matt Crafton	ThorSport Racing	Toyota	175	0	Running	30
4	29	Tyler Reddick	Brad Keselowski Racing	Ford	175	0	Running	29
5	17	Timothy Peters	Red Horse Racing	Toyota	175	0	Running	28
6	00	Cole Custer (R)	JR Motorsports	Chevrolet	175	0	Running	27
7	24	Kaz Grala	GMS Racing	Chevrolet	175	0	Running	26
8	11	Brett Moffitt	Red Horse Racing	Toyota	175	0	Running	25
9	21	Johnny Sauter	GMS Racing	Chevrolet	175	0	Running	24
10	33	Ben Kennedy	GMS Racing	Chevrolet	175	0	Running	23
11	05	John Wes Townley	Athenian Motorsports	Chevrolet	175	0	Running	22
12	16	Stewart Friesen	Halmar Racing	Chevrolet	175	0	Running	21
13	23	Spencer Gallagher	GMS Racing	Chevrolet	175	0	Running	20
14	41	Ben Rhodes (R)	ThorSport Racing	Toyota	175	0	Running	19
15	81	Ryan Truex	Hattori Racing Enterprises	Toyota	174	0	Running	18
16	98	Rico Abreu (R)	ThorSport Racing	Toyota	174	0	Running	17
17	50	Travis Kvapil	MAKE Motorsports	Chevrolet	174	0	Running	16
18	13	Cameron Hayley	ThorSport Racing	Toyota	174	0	Running	15
19	51	Cody Coughlin (R)	Kyle Busch Motorsports	Toyota	173	3	Running	14
20	44	Tommy Joe Martins	Martins Motorsports	Chevrolet	172	0	Running	13
21	66	Jordan Anderson	Bolen Motorsports	Chevrolet	171	0	Running	12
22	07	Matt Mills	SS-Green Light Racing	Chevrolet	171	0	Running	11
23	71	Alon Day	Contreras Motorsports	Chevrolet	171	0	Running	10
24	1	Jennifer Jo Cobb	Jennifer Jo Cobb Racing	Chevrolet	170	0	Running	9
25	74	Tim Viens	Mike Harmon Racing	Chevrolet	160	0	Running	8
26	49	Josh Wise (i)	Premium Motorsports	Chevrolet	147	0	Running	0
27	19	Daniel Hemric	Brad Keselowski Racing	Ford	127	0	Brakes	6
28	22	Austin Wayne Self (R)	AM Racing	Toyota	126	0	Accident	5
29	02	Austin Hill	Austin Hill Racing	Ford	105	0	Oil Line	4
30	63	Akinori Ogata	MB Motorsports	Chevrolet	75	0	Running	3
31	10	Caleb Roark	Jennifer Jo Cobb Racing	Chevrolet	0	0	Accident	2
DSQ	8	John Hunter Nemechek (Note: Nemechek initially finished 9th respectively, but was disqualified after height violations were found in post-race inspection. A few days later, Nemechek was penalized 10 owner points, with crew chief Gere Kennon being fined US$6,000.)	NEMCO Motorsports	Chevrolet	175	0	Height violation	1
Official race results

== Standings after the race ==
Drivers' Championship standings

	Pos	Driver	Points
	1	William Byron	2,052
	2	Matt Crafton	2,036 (−16)
1	3	Christopher Bell	2,035 (−17)
4	4	Timothy Peters	2,028 (−24)
	5	Johnny Sauter	2,026 (−26)
	6	Ben Kennedy	2,025 (−27)
4	7	John Hunter Nemechek	2,020 (−32)
3	8	Daniel Hemric	2,005 (−47)
Official driver's standings

- Note: Only the first 8 positions are included for the driver standings.

Previous race: 2016 American Ethanol E15 225	NASCAR Camping World Truck Series; 2016 season	Next race: 2016 DC Solar 350
