= 2016 DC Solar 350 =

18th race of the 2016 NASCAR Camping World Truck Series

Race details
- Race 18 of 23 of the 2016 NASCAR Camping World Truck Series
- Date: October 1, 2016
- Official name: 20th Annual DC Solar 350
- Location: Las Vegas Motor Speedway, North Las Vegas, Nevada
- Course: Permanent racing facility
- Course length: 1.5 miles (2.4 km)
- Distance: 146 laps, 219 mi (352 km)
- Scheduled distance: 146 laps, 219 mi (352 km)
- Average speed: 143.163 mph (230.399 km/h)

Pole position
Driver	Timothy Peters	Red Horse Racing
- Time: 30.690

Most laps led
Driver	Tyler Reddick	Brad Keselowski Racing
- Laps: 70

Winner
No. 29	Tyler Reddick	Brad Keselowski Racing

Television in the United States
- Network: FS1
- Announcers: Vince Welch, Phil Parsons, and Michael Waltrip

Radio in the United States
- Radio: MRN

The 2016 DC Solar 350 was the 18th stock car race of the 2016 NASCAR Camping World Truck Series, the second race of the Round of 8, and the 20th iteration of the event. The race was held on Saturday, October 1, 2016, in North Las Vegas, Nevada, at Las Vegas Motor Speedway, a 1.5-mile (2.4 km) permanent tri-oval shaped racetrack. The race took the scheduled 146 laps to complete. Tyler Reddick, driving for Brad Keselowski Racing, dominated the majority of the race, and earned his third career NASCAR Camping World Truck Series win, and his first of the season. To fill out the podium, Daniel Hemric, driving for Brad Keselowski Racing, and Cole Custer, driving for JR Motorsports, would finish 2nd and 3rd, respectively.

== Background ==
The layout of Las Vegas Motor Speedway, the venue where the race was held.

Las Vegas Motor Speedway, located in Clark County, Nevada in Las Vegas, Nevada about 15 miles northeast of the Las Vegas Strip, is a 1,200-acre (490 ha) complex of multiple tracks for motorsports racing. The complex is owned by Speedway Motorsports, Inc., which is headquartered in Charlotte, North Carolina.

=== Entry list ===
- (R) denotes rookie driver.
- (i) denotes driver who is ineligible for series driver points.

#	Driver	Team	Make	Sponsor
00	Cole Custer (R)	JR Motorsports	Chevrolet	Haas Automation
1	Jennifer Jo Cobb	Jennifer Jo Cobb Racing	Chevrolet	Waldo's Painting Company
02	Tyler Young	Young's Motorsports	Chevrolet	Randco, Young's Building Systems
4	Christopher Bell (R)	Kyle Busch Motorsports	Toyota	DC Solar
05	John Wes Townley	Athenian Motorsports	Chevrolet	Jive Communications, Zaxby's
07	Todd Peck (i)	SS-Green Light Racing	Chevrolet	BoobiTrap.com
8	John Hunter Nemechek	NEMCO Motorsports	Chevrolet	Fire Alarm Services
9	William Byron (R)	Kyle Busch Motorsports	Toyota	Liberty University
10	Caleb Roark	Jennifer Jo Cobb Racing	Chevrolet	Driven2Honor.org
11	Matt Tifft (R)	Red Horse Racing	Toyota	Brain Gear, Surface Sunscreen
13	Cameron Hayley	ThorSport Racing	Toyota	Ride TV
16	Stewart Friesen	Halmar Racing	Chevrolet	Halmar International
17	Timothy Peters	Red Horse Racing	Toyota	Red Horse Racing
19	Daniel Hemric	Brad Keselowski Racing	Ford	Blue Gate Bank
21	Johnny Sauter	GMS Racing	Chevrolet	Allegiant Travel Company
22	Austin Wayne Self (R)	AM Racing	Toyota	AM Technical Solutions
23	Spencer Gallagher	GMS Racing	Chevrolet	Shade Tree
24	Grant Enfinger (R)	GMS Racing	Chevrolet	Champion Power Equipment
29	Tyler Reddick	Brad Keselowski Racing	Ford	Cooper-Standard Automotive
33	Ben Kennedy	GMS Racing	Chevrolet	Jacob Companies
41	Ben Rhodes (R)	ThorSport Racing	Toyota	USA Cares
44	Tommy Joe Martins	Martins Motorsports	Chevrolet	Diamond Gusset Jeans
49	Wayne Edwards	Premium Motorsports	Chevrolet	Premium Motorsports
50	Travis Kvapil	MAKE Motorsports	Chevrolet	MAKE Motorsports
51	Cody Coughlin (R)	Kyle Busch Motorsports	Toyota	Jegs High Performance, K&N
63	Norm Benning	Norm Benning Racing	Chevrolet	Norm Benning Racing
66	Tim Viens	Mike Harmon Racing	Chevrolet	Vermont Bucks Football
71	Carlos Contreras	Contreras Motorsports	Chevrolet	American Club
88	Matt Crafton	ThorSport Racing	Toyota	Ideal Door, Menards
92	Parker Kligerman	RBR Enterprises	Ford	Black's Tire Service, Goodyear
98	Rico Abreu (R)	ThorSport Racing	Toyota	Safelite, Curb Records
Official entry list

== Practice ==
=== First practice ===
The first practice session was held on Saturday, October 1, at 8:30 am PST, and would last for 60 minutes. Daniel Hemric, driving for Brad Keselowski Racing, would set the fastest time in the session, with a lap of 30.512, and an average speed of 176.980 mph (284.822 km/h).

Pos.	#	Driver	Team	Make	Time	Speed
1	19	Daniel Hemric	Brad Keselowski Racing	Ford	30.512	176.980
2	88	Matt Crafton	ThorSport Racing	Toyota	30.595	176.499
3	41	Ben Rhodes (R)	ThorSport Racing	Toyota	30.606	176.436
Full first practice results

=== Final practice ===
The final practice session was held on Saturday, October 1, at 10:00 am PST, and would last for 60 minutes. Rico Abreu, driving for ThorSport Racing, would set the fastest time in the session, with a lap of 30.577, and an average speed of 176.603 mph (284.215 km/h).

Pos.	#	Driver	Team	Make	Time	Speed
1	98	Rico Abreu (R)	ThorSport Racing	Toyota	30.577	176.603
2	19	Daniel Hemric	Brad Keselowski Racing	Ford	30.621	176.350
3	23	Spencer Gallagher	GMS Racing	Chevrolet	30.647	176.200
Full final practice results

== Qualifying ==
Qualifying was held on Saturday, October 1, at 3:10 pm PST. Since Las Vegas Motor Speedway is at least 1.5 miles (2.4 km) in length, the qualifying system was a single car, single lap, two round system where in the first round, everyone would set a time to determine positions 13–32. Then, the fastest 12 qualifiers would move on to the second round to determine positions 1–12.

Timothy Peters, driving for Red Horse Racing, would score the pole for the race, with a lap of 30.690, and an average speed of 175.953 mph (283.169 km/h) in the second round.

=== Full qualifying results ===
Pos.	#	Driver	Team	Make	Time (R1)	Speed (R1)	Time (R2)	Speed (R2)
1	17	Timothy Peters	Red Horse Racing	Toyota	30.950	174.475	30.690	175.953
2	88	Matt Crafton	ThorSport Racing	Toyota	30.832	175.143	30.741	175.661
3	00	Cole Custer (R)	JR Motorsports	Chevrolet	30.937	174.548	30.753	175.593
4	33	Ben Kennedy	GMS Racing	Chevrolet	30.952	174.464	30.776	175.461
5	23	Spencer Gallagher	GMS Racing	Chevrolet	30.967	174.379	30.791	175.376
6	19	Daniel Hemric	Brad Keselowski Racing	Ford	30.724	175.758	30.795	175.353
7	05	John Wes Townley	Athenian Motorsports	Chevrolet	30.801	175.319	30.830	175.154
8	41	Ben Rhodes (R)	ThorSport Racing	Toyota	30.914	174.678	30.879	174.876
9	13	Cameron Hayley	ThorSport Racing	Toyota	30.916	174.667	30.896	174.780
10	9	William Byron (R)	Kyle Busch Motorsports	Toyota	30.845	175.069	30.985	174.278
11	51	Cody Coughlin (R)	Kyle Busch Motorsports	Toyota	30.990	174.250	31.002	174.182
12	24	Grant Enfinger (R)	GMS Racing	Chevrolet	30.895	174.786	31.031	174.020
Eliminated in Round 1
13	11	Matt Tifft (R)	Kyle Busch Motorsports	Toyota	30.996	174.216	–	–
14	21	Johnny Sauter	GMS Racing	Chevrolet	30.996	174.216	–	–
15	8	John Hunter Nemechek	NEMCO Motorsports	Chevrolet	30.996	174.216	–	–
16	29	Tyler Reddick	Brad Keselowski Racing	Ford	30.998	174.205	–	–
17	98	Rico Abreu (R)	ThorSport Racing	Toyota	31.008	174.149	–	–
18	4	Christopher Bell (R)	Kyle Busch Motorsports	Toyota	31.016	174.104	–	–
19	16	Stewart Friesen	Halmar Racing	Chevrolet	31.158	173.310	–	–
20	92	Parker Kligerman	RBR Enterprises	Ford	31.352	172.238	–	–
21	02	Tyler Young	Young's Motorsports	Chevrolet	31.522	171.309	–	–
22	44	Tommy Joe Martins	Martins Motorsports	Chevrolet	31.585	170.967	–	–
23	50	Travis Kvapil	MAKE Motorsports	Chevrolet	31.699	170.352	–	–
24	1	Jennifer Jo Cobb	Jennifer Jo Cobb Racing	Chevrolet	31.870	169.438	–	–
25	22	Austin Wayne Self (R)	AM Racing	Toyota	31.874	169.417	–	–
26	07	Todd Peck (i)	SS-Green Light Racing	Chevrolet	32.435	166.487	–	–
27	71	Carlos Contreras	Contreras Motorsports	Chevrolet	32.516	166.072	–	–
Qualified by owner's points
28	49	Wayne Edwards	Premium Motorsports	Chevrolet	32.552	165.888	–	–
29	63	Norm Benning	Norm Benning Racing	Chevrolet	33.289	162.216	–	–
30	66	Tim Viens	Mike Harmon Racing	Chevrolet	34.028	158.693	–	–
31	10	Caleb Roark	Jennifer Jo Cobb Racing	Chevrolet	34.387	157.036	–	–
Official qualifying results
Official starting lineup

== Race results ==
Fin	St	#	Driver	Team	Make	Laps	Led	Status	Pts
1	16	29	Tyler Reddick	Brad Keselowski Racing	Ford	146	70	Running	37
2	6	19	Daniel Hemric	Brad Keselowski Racing	Ford	146	38	Running	32
3	3	00	Cole Custer (R)	JR Motorsports	Chevrolet	146	3	Running	31
4	4	33	Ben Kennedy	GMS Racing	Chevrolet	146	22	Running	30
5	10	9	William Byron (R)	Kyle Busch Motorsports	Toyota	146	0	Running	28
6	18	4	Christopher Bell (R)	Kyle Busch Motorsports	Toyota	146	0	Running	27
7	14	21	Johnny Sauter	GMS Racing	Chevrolet	146	0	Running	26
8	2	88	Matt Crafton	ThorSport Racing	Toyota	146	0	Running	25
9	1	17	Timothy Peters	Red Horse Racing	Toyota	146	13	Running	25
10	12	24	Grant Enfinger (R)	GMS Racing	Chevrolet	146	0	Running	23
11	5	23	Spencer Gallagher	GMS Racing	Chevrolet	146	0	Running	22
12	8	41	Ben Rhodes (R)	ThorSport Racing	Toyota	146	0	Running	21
13	7	05	John Wes Townley	Athenian Motorsports	Chevrolet	146	0	Running	20
14	20	92	Parker Kligerman	RBR Enterprises	Ford	146	0	Running	19
15	13	11	Matt Tifft (R)	Red Horse Racing	Toyota	146	0	Running	18
16	15	8	John Hunter Nemechek	NEMCO Motorsports	Chevrolet	145	0	Running	17
17	11	51	Cody Coughlin (R)	Kyle Busch Motorsports	Toyota	145	0	Running	16
18	9	13	Cameron Hayley	ThorSport Racing	Toyota	145	0	Running	15
19	19	16	Stewart Friesen	Halmar Racing	Chevrolet	145	0	Running	14
20	17	98	Rico Abreu (R)	ThorSport Racing	Toyota	144	0	Running	13
21	25	22	Austin Wayne Self (R)	AM Racing	Toyota	142	0	Running	12
22	22	44	Tommy Joe Martins	Martins Motorsports	Chevrolet	142	0	Running	11
23	21	02	Tyler Young	Young's Motorsports	Chevrolet	142	0	Running	10
24	23	50	Travis Kvapil	MAKE Motorsports	Chevrolet	140	0	Running	9
25	26	07	Todd Peck (i)	SS-Green Light Racing	Chevrolet	138	0	Running	0
26	29	63	Norm Benning	Norm Benning Racing	Chevrolet	134	0	Running	7
27	24	1	Jennifer Jo Cobb	Jennifer Jo Cobb Racing	Chevrolet	74	0	Suspension	6
28	28	49	Wayne Edwards	Premium Motorsports	Chevrolet	48	0	Accident	5
29	30	66	Tim Viens	Mike Harmon Racing	Chevrolet	29	0	Oil Leak	4
30	27	71	Carlos Contreras	Contreras Motorsports	Chevrolet	9	0	Vibration	3
31	31	10	Caleb Roark	Jennifer Jo Cobb Racing	Chevrolet	4	0	Electrical	2
Official race results

== Standings after the race ==
Drivers' Championship standings

	Pos	Driver	Points
	1	William Byron	2,080
1	2	Christopher Bell	2,062 (−18)
1	3	Matt Crafton	2,061 (−19)
2	4	Ben Kennedy	2,055 (−25)
1	5	Timothy Peters	2,053 (−27)
1	6	Johnny Sauter	2,052 (−28)
1	7	Daniel Hemric	2,037 (−43)
1	8	John Hunter Nemechek	2,037 (−43)
Official driver's standings

- Note: Only the first 8 positions are included for the driver standings.

Previous race: 2016 UNOH 175	NASCAR Camping World Truck Series; 2016 season	Next race: 2016 Fred's 250
