= 2015 Pocono Mountains 150 =

12th race of the 2015 NASCAR Camping World Truck Series

Race details
- Race 12 of 23 of the 2015 NASCAR Camping World Truck Series
- Date: August 1, 2015
- Official name: 6th Annual Pocono Mountains 150
- Location: Pocono Raceway, Long Pond, Pennsylvania
- Course: Permanent racing facility
- Course length: 2.5 miles (4.0 km)
- Distance: 69 laps, 172 mi (277 km)
- Scheduled distance: 60 laps, 150 mi (241 km)
- Average speed: 119.607 mph (192.489 km/h)

Pole position
Driver	Erik Jones	Kyle Busch Motorsports
- Time: 54.151

Most laps led
Driver	Kyle Busch	Kyle Busch Motorsports
- Laps: 53

Winner
No. 51	Kyle Busch	Kyle Busch Motorsports

Television in the United States
- Network: FS1
- Announcers: Vince Welch, Phil Parsons, and Michael Waltrip

Radio in the United States
- Radio: MRN

The 2015 Pocono Mountains 150 was the 12th stock car race of the 2015 NASCAR Camping World Truck Series, and the 6th iteration of the event. The race was held on Saturday, August 1, 2015, in Long Pond, Pennsylvania at Pocono Raceway, a 2.5 mile (4.0 km) permanent triangular-shaped racetrack. The race was increased from 60 to 69 laps, due to numerous NASCAR overtime attempts. Kyle Busch, driving for his team, Kyle Busch Motorsports, would hold off the field in three overtime attempts to earn his 43rd career NASCAR Camping World Truck Series win, and his first of the season. Busch had dominated the race as well, leading a race-high 53 laps. To fill out the podium, Kevin Harvick, driving for JR Motorsports, and Tyler Reddick, driving for Brad Keselowski Racing, would finish 2nd and 3rd, respectively.

== Background ==
The layout of Pocono Raceway, the circuit where the race was held.

Pocono Raceway (formerly Pocono International Raceway), also known as The Tricky Triangle, is a superspeedway located in the Pocono Mountains in Long Pond, Pennsylvania. It is the site of three NASCAR national series races and an ARCA Racing Series event in July: a NASCAR Sprint Cup Series race with support events by the NASCAR Xfinity Series and NASCAR Camping World Truck Series. From 1971 to 1989, and since 2013, the track also hosted an Indy Car race, currently sanctioned by the IndyCar Series. Additionally, since 1982, it currently hosts two NASCAR Sprint Cup Series races.

=== Entry list ===
- (R) denotes rookie driver.
- (i) denotes driver who is ineligible for series driver points.

#	Driver	Team	Make	Sponsor
00	Kevin Harvick (i)	JR Motorsports	Chevrolet	Haas Automation
0	Caleb Roark	Jennifer Jo Cobb Racing	Chevrolet	Driven2Honor.org
1	Travis Kvapil	MAKE Motorsports	Chevrolet	Burnie Grill
02	Tyler Young	Young's Motorsports	Chevrolet	Randco, Young's Building Systems
03	Tim Viens	Mike Affarano Motorsports	Chevrolet	Viens-Land Racing, RaceDaySponsor.com
4	Erik Jones (R)	Kyle Busch Motorsports	Toyota	Special Olympics World Games
05	John Wes Townley	Athenian Motorsports	Chevrolet	Zaxby's
6	Norm Benning	Norm Benning Racing	Chevrolet	Norm Benning Racing
07	Ray Black Jr. (R)	SS-Green Light Racing	Chevrolet	ScubaLife
08	Korbin Forrister (R)	BJMM with SS-Green Light Racing	Chevrolet	Trump for President
8	John Hunter Nemechek (R)	SWM-NEMCO Motorsports	Chevrolet	D. A. B. Constructors
10	Jennifer Jo Cobb	Jennifer Jo Cobb Racing	Chevrolet	Jennifer Jo Cobb Racing
11	Ben Kennedy	Red Horse Racing	Toyota	Local Motors
13	Cameron Hayley (R)	ThorSport Racing	Toyota	Carolina Nut Company
14	Daniel Hemric (R)	NTS Motorsports	Chevrolet	California Clean Power
15	Mason Mingus	Billy Boat Motorsports	Chevrolet	Call 811 Before You Dig
17	Timothy Peters	Red Horse Racing	Toyota	Red Horse Racing
19	Tyler Reddick	Brad Keselowski Racing	Ford	DrawTite
23	Spencer Gallagher (R)	GMS Racing	Chevrolet	Allegiant Travel Company
28	Ryan Ellis	FDNY Racing	Chevrolet	FDNY 150th Anniversary
29	Brad Keselowski (i)	Brad Keselowski Racing	Ford	Cooper-Standard Automotive
33	Austin Dillon (i)	GMS Racing	Chevrolet	Rheem
36	Justin Jennings	MB Motorsports	Chevrolet	Mittler Bros., Ski Soda
40	Todd Peck	Peck Motorsports	Chevrolet	Arthritis Foundation, OSS Health
45	B. J. McLeod	B. J. McLeod Motorsports	Chevrolet	Tilted Kilt
50	Kyle Martel	Bill Martel Racing	Chevrolet	Finish Line Express
51	Kyle Busch (i)	Kyle Busch Motorsports	Toyota	Dollar General
54	Matt Tifft	Kyle Busch Motorsports	Toyota	ToyotaCare
63	Garrett Smithley	MB Motorsports	Chevrolet	SEGPAY, Mittler Bros., Ski Soda
74	Jordan Anderson	Mike Harmon Racing	Chevrolet	Tri-Analytics, SRGRX.com
88	Matt Crafton	ThorSport Racing	Toyota	Chi-Chi's, Menards
94	Wendell Chavous	Premium Motorsports	Chevrolet	Lilly Trucking, Testoril
98	Johnny Sauter	ThorSport Racing	Toyota	Nextant Aerospace, Curb Records
Official entry list

== Practice ==
The first and only practice session was held on Friday, July 31, at 2:00 PM EST, and would last for 2 hours and 25 minutes. Austin Dillon, driving for GMS Racing, would set the fastest time in the session, with a lap of 54.060, and an average speed of 166.482 mph (267.927 km/h).

Pos.	#	Driver	Team	Make	Time	Speed
1	33	Austin Dillon (i)	GMS Racing	Chevrolet	54.060	166.482
2	4	Erik Jones (R)	Kyle Busch Motorsports	Toyota	54.344	165.612
3	51	Kyle Busch (i)	Kyle Busch Motorsports	Toyota	54.538	165.023
Full practice results

== Qualifying ==
Qualifying was held on Saturday, August 1, at 10:00 AM EST. The qualifying system used is a multi car, multi lap, two round system where in the first round, everyone would set a time to determine positions 13–32. Then, the fastest 12 qualifiers would move on to the second round to determine positions 1-12.

Erik Jones, driving for Kyle Busch Motorsports, would win the pole after advancing from the preliminary round and setting the fastest time in Round 2, with a lap of 54.151, and an average speed of 166.202 mph (267.476 km/h).

Tim Viens was the only driver that failed to qualify.

=== Full qualifying results ===
Pos.	#	Driver	Team	Make	Time (R1)	Speed (R1)	Time (R2)	Speed (R2)
1	4	Erik Jones (R)	Kyle Busch Motorsports	Toyota	54.234	165.948	54.151	166.202
2	51	Kyle Busch (i)	Kyle Busch Motorsports	Toyota	54.123	166.288	54.181	166.110
3	88	Matt Crafton	ThorSport Racing	Toyota	54.204	166.039	54.183	166.104
4	29	Brad Keselowski (i)	Brad Keselowski Racing	Ford	54.749	164.387	54.237	165.938
5	33	Austin Dillon (i)	GMS Racing	Chevrolet	54.890	163.964	54.246	165.911
6	19	Tyler Reddick	Brad Keselowski Racing	Ford	54.500	165.138	54.360	165.563
7	00	Kevin Harvick (i)	JR Motorsports	Chevrolet	54.795	164.249	54.364	165.551
8	11	Ben Kennedy	Red Horse Racing	Toyota	54.996	163.648	54.598	164.841
9	8	John Hunter Nemechek (R)	SWM-NEMCO Motorsports	Chevrolet	54.727	164.453	54.941	163.812
10	05	John Wes Townley	Athenian Motorsports	Chevrolet	54.643	164.705	55.080	163.399
11	15	Mason Mingus	Billy Boat Motorsports	Chevrolet	55.095	163.354	55.406	162.437
12	17	Timothy Peters	Red Horse Racing	Toyota	54.725	164.459	–	–
Eliminated from Round 1
13	23	Spencer Gallagher (R)	GMS Racing	Chevrolet	55.158	163.168	–	–
14	54	Matt Tifft	Kyle Busch Motorsports	Toyota	55.323	162.681	–	–
15	14	Daniel Hemric (R)	NTS Motorsports	Chevrolet	55.348	162.608	–	–
16	13	Cameron Hayley (R)	ThorSport Racing	Toyota	55.394	162.472	–	–
17	98	Johnny Sauter	ThorSport Racing	Toyota	55.872	161.082	–	–
18	63	Garrett Smithley	MB Motorsports	Chevrolet	56.453	159.425	–	–
19	1	Travis Kvapil	MAKE Motorsports	Chevrolet	56.790	158.479	–	–
20	02	Tyler Young	Young's Motorsports	Chevrolet	56.869	158.258	–	–
21	74	Jordan Anderson	Mike Harmon Racing	Chevrolet	56.963	157.997	–	–
22	45	B. J. McLeod	B. J. McLeod Motorsports	Chevrolet	57.125	157.549	–	–
23	40	Todd Peck	Peck Motorsports	Chevrolet	57.579	156.307	–	–
24	10	Jennifer Jo Cobb	Jennifer Jo Cobb Racing	Chevrolet	57.592	156.272	–	–
25	28	Ryan Ellis	FDNY Racing	Chevrolet	57.945	155.329	–	–
26	94	Wendell Chavous	Premium Motorsports	Chevrolet	58.148	154.777	–	–
27	0	Caleb Roark	Jennifer Jo Cobb Racing	Chevrolet	59.776	153.124	–	–
Qualified by owner's points
28	36	Justin Jennings	MB Motorsports	Chevrolet	59.447	151.395	–	–
29	08	Korbin Forrister (R)	BJMM with SS-Green Light Racing	Chevrolet	1:00.213	149.469	–	–
30	6	Norm Benning	Norm Benning Racing	Chevrolet	1:01.632	146.028	–	–
31	07	Ray Black Jr. (R)	SS-Green Light Racing	Chevrolet	–	–	–	–
32	50	Kyle Martel	Bill Martel Racing	Chevrolet	–	–	–	–
Failed to qualify
33	03	Tim Viens	Mike Affarano Motorsports	Chevrolet	1:00.837	147.936	–	–
Official qualifying results
Official starting lineup

== Race results ==
Fin	St	#	Driver	Team	Make	Laps	Led	Status	Pts	Winnings
1	2	51	Kyle Busch (i)	Kyle Busch Motorsports	Toyota	69	53	Running	0	$41,542
2	7	00	Kevin Harvick (i)	JR Motorsports	Chevrolet	69	0	Running	0	$26,768
3	6	19	Tyler Reddick	Brad Keselowski Racing	Ford	69	0	Running	41	$27,203
4	16	13	Cameron Hayley (R)	ThorSport Racing	Toyota	69	0	Running	40	$21,817
5	5	33	Austin Dillon (i)	GMS Racing	Chevrolet	69	0	Running	0	$16,613
6	17	98	Johnny Sauter	ThorSport Racing	Toyota	69	4	Running	39	$16,279
7	12	17	Timothy Peters	Red Horse Racing	Toyota	69	0	Running	37	$15,725
8	14	54	Matt Tifft	Kyle Busch Motorsports	Toyota	69	0	Running	36	$15,475
9	15	14	Daniel Hemric (R)	NTS Motorsports	Chevrolet	69	0	Running	35	$15,420
10	1	4	Erik Jones (R)	Kyle Busch Motorsports	Toyota	69	9	Running	35	$18,587
11	8	11	Ben Kennedy	Red Horse Racing	Toyota	69	0	Running	33	$15,281
12	11	15	Mason Mingus	Billy Boat Motorsports	Chevrolet	69	0	Running	32	$15,141
13	9	8	John Hunter Nemechek (R)	SWM-NEMCO Motorsports	Chevrolet	69	0	Running	31	$15,058
14	13	23	Spencer Gallagher (R)	GMS Racing	Chevrolet	69	3	Running	31	$15,003
15	20	02	Tyler Young	Young's Motorsports	Chevrolet	69	0	Running	29	$15,264
16	18	63	Garrett Smithley	MB Motorsports	Chevrolet	69	0	Running	28	$14,953
17	10	05	John Wes Townley	Athenian Motorsports	Chevrolet	68	0	Running	27	$14,643
18	21	74	Jordan Anderson	Mike Harmon Racing	Chevrolet	67	0	Running	26	$14,503
19	32	50	Kyle Martel	Bill Martel Racing	Chevrolet	67	0	Running	25	$14,393
20	25	28	Ryan Ellis	FDNY Racing	Chevrolet	67	0	Running	24	$12,587
21	23	40	Todd Peck	Peck Motorsports	Chevrolet	66	0	Running	23	$11,921
22	30	6	Norm Benning	Norm Benning Racing	Chevrolet	63	0	Running	22	$14,060
23	19	1	Travis Kvapil	MAKE Motorsports	Chevrolet	56	0	Running	21	$13,949
24	31	07	Ray Black Jr. (R)	SS-Green Light Racing	Chevrolet	52	0	Accident	20	$12,616
25	26	94	Wendell Chavous	Premium Motorsports	Chevrolet	51	0	Accident	19	$12,727
26	24	10	Jennifer Jo Cobb	Jennifer Jo Cobb Racing	Chevrolet	49	0	Running	18	$11,533
27	29	08	Korbin Forrister (R)	BJMM with SS-Green Light Racing	Chevrolet	24	0	Accident	17	$11,505
28	3	88	Matt Crafton	ThorSport Racing	Toyota	13	0	Accident	16	$12,258
29	22	45	B. J. McLeod	B. J. McLeod Motorsports	Chevrolet	12	0	Overheating	15	$11,229
30	4	29	Brad Keselowski (i)	Brad Keselowski Racing	Ford	5	0	Accident	0	$10,729
31	28	36	Justin Jennings	MB Motorsports	Chevrolet	3	0	Vibration	13	$9,229
32	27	0	Caleb Roark	Jennifer Jo Cobb Racing	Chevrolet	3	0	Suspension	12	$8,229
Official race results

== Standings after the race ==
Drivers' Championship standings

	Pos	Driver	Points
1	1	Tyler Reddick	479
1	2	Matt Crafton	468 (-11)
	3	Erik Jones	463 (–16)
	4	Johnny Sauter	420 (–59)
1	5	Cameron Hayley	391 (–88)
1	6	John Wes Townley	387 (–92)
	7	Daniel Hemric	382 (–97)
	8	Timothy Peters	380 (–99)
	9	Spencer Gallagher	366 (–113)
	10	Ben Kennedy	362 (–117)
Official driver's standings

- Note: Only the first 10 positions are included for the driver standings.

Previous race: 2015 Mudsummer Classic	NASCAR Camping World Truck Series; 2015 season	Next race: 2015 Careers for Veterans 200
