= 2015 Lucas Oil 150 =

22nd race of the 2015 NASCAR Camping World Truck Series

Race details
- Race 22 of 23 of the 2015 NASCAR Camping World Truck Series
- Date: November 13, 2015
- Official name: 21st Annual Lucas Oil 150
- Location: Phoenix International Raceway, Avondale, Arizona
- Course: Permanent racing facility
- Course length: 1 miles (1.6 km)
- Distance: 150 laps, 150 mi (241 km)
- Scheduled distance: 150 laps, 150 mi (241 km)
- Average speed: 92.704 mph (149.193 km/h)

Pole position
Driver	Erik Jones	Kyle Busch Motorsports
- Time: 26.179

Most laps led
Driver	Erik Jones	Kyle Busch Motorsports
- Laps: 106

Winner
No. 17	Timothy Peters	Red Horse Racing

Television in the United States
- Network: FS1
- Announcers: Ralph Sheheen, Phil Parsons, and Michael Waltrip

Radio in the United States
- Radio: MRN

The 2015 Lucas Oil 150 was the 22nd stock car race of the 2015 NASCAR Camping World Truck Series, and the 21st iteration of the event. The race was held on Friday, November 13, 2015, in Avondale, Arizona at Phoenix International Raceway, a 1 mi (1.6 km) permanent quad-oval shaped racetrack. The race took the scheduled 150 laps to complete. Timothy Peters, driving for Red Horse Racing, would hold off John Hunter Nemechek with under 30 laps to go, and earned his 10th career NASCAR Camping World Truck Series win, and his second of the season. Pole-sitter Erik Jones dominated the entire race, leading 106 of the 150 laps before being involved in an incident with Matt Crafton with 30 laps to go. To fill out the podium, Nemechek, driving for family-owned SWM-NEMCO Motorsports, and John Wes Townley, driving for family-owned Athenian Motorsports, would finish 2nd and 3rd, respectively.

== Background ==
The layout of Phoenix International Raceway, the circuit where the race was held.

Phoenix International Raceway is a 1-mile, low-banked tri-oval race track located in Avondale, Arizona, near Phoenix. The motorsport track opened in 1964 and currently hosts two NASCAR race weekends annually. Phoenix Raceway has also hosted the CART, IndyCar Series, USAC and the WeatherTech SportsCar Championship. The raceway is currently owned and operated by NASCAR subsidiary International Speedway Corporation.

=== Entry list ===
- (R) denotes rookie driver.
- (i) denotes driver who is ineligible for series driver points.

#	Driver	Team	Make	Sponsor
00	Cole Custer	JR Motorsports	Chevrolet	Haas Automation
0	Caleb Roark	Jennifer Jo Cobb Racing	Chevrolet	Driven2Honor.org
1	Rubén Pardo	Rick Ware Racing	Chevrolet	BYB Extreme Fighting Series
02	Tyler Young	Young's Motorsports	Chevrolet	Randco, Young's Building Systems
4	Erik Jones (R)	Kyle Busch Motorsports	Toyota	Toyota Certified Used Vehicles
05	John Wes Townley	Athenian Motorsports	Chevrolet	Zaxby's
5	Dalton Sargeant	Wauters Motorsports	Toyota	Galt
6	Norm Benning	Norm Benning Racing	Chevrolet	Norm Benning Racing
07	Ray Black Jr. (R)	SS-Green Light Racing	Chevrolet	ScubaLife
08	Korbin Forrister (R)	BJMM with SS-Green Light Racing	Chevrolet	Tilted Kilt
8	John Hunter Nemechek (R)	SWM-NEMCO Motorsports	Chevrolet	Anderson's Pure Maple Syrup
9	William Byron	Kyle Busch Motorsports	Toyota	Liberty University
10	Jennifer Jo Cobb	Jennifer Jo Cobb Racing	Chevrolet	POW, MIAFamilies.org
11	Ben Kennedy	Red Horse Racing	Toyota	Local Motors
13	Cameron Hayley (R)	ThorSport Racing	Toyota	Protect the Harvest
14	Daniel Hemric (R)	NTS Motorsports	Chevrolet	California Clean Power
15	Mason Mingus	Billy Boat Motorsports	Chevrolet	Call 811 Before You Dig
16	Chad Boat	Billy Boat Motorsports	Chevrolet	Pristine Auction, Lawson Rock & Oil
17	Timothy Peters	Red Horse Racing	Toyota	Red Horse Racing
19	Tyler Reddick	Brad Keselowski Racing	Ford	DrawTite
23	Spencer Gallagher (R)	GMS Racing	Chevrolet	Allegiant Travel Company
29	Austin Cindric	Brad Keselowski Racing	Ford	Cooper-Standard Automotive
31	Rico Abreu	NTS Motorsports	Chevrolet	AccuDoc Solutions
32	Justin Haley	Braun Motorsports	Chevrolet	Great Clips
33	Brandon Jones (R)	GMS Racing	Chevrolet	Lucas Oil
36	Bobby Pierce	MB Motorsports	Chevrolet	Mittler Bros., Ski Soda
45	Brandon Hightower	B. J. McLeod Motorsports	Chevrolet	Advanced Specialized Carriers
49	Cassie Gannis	Mike Harmon Racing	RAM	InnerDivaDen.com
50	Travis Kvapil	MAKE Motorsports	Chevrolet	CorvetteParts.net
51	Daniel Suárez (i)	Kyle Busch Motorsports	Toyota	Arris
54	Matt Tifft	Kyle Busch Motorsports	Toyota	games.NASCAR.com
63	Akinori Ogata	MB Motorsports	Chevrolet	Eneos
74	Jordan Anderson	Mike Harmon Racing	Chevrolet	Mike Harmon Racing
88	Matt Crafton	ThorSport Racing	Toyota	Ideal Door, Menards
94	Timmy Hill	Premium Motorsports	Chevrolet	Testoril, Champion Machinery
98	Johnny Sauter	ThorSport Racing	Toyota	Smokey Mountain Herbal Snuff
Official entry list

== Practice ==
The first and only practice session was held on Thursday, November 12, at 2:30 PM MST, and would last for 2 hours and 25 minutes. Cameron Hayley, driving for ThorSport Racing, would set the fastest time in the session, with a lap of 26.192, and an average speed of 137.447 mph (221.200 km/h).

Pos.	#	Driver	Team	Make	Time	Speed
1	13	Cameron Hayley (R)	ThorSport Racing	Toyota	26.192	137.447
2	4	Erik Jones (R)	Kyle Busch Motorsports	Toyota	26.276	137.007
3	33	Brandon Jones (R)	GMS Racing	Chevrolet	26.429	136.214
Full first practice results

== Qualifying ==
Qualifying was held on Friday, November 13, at 10:45 AM MST. The qualifying system used is a multi car, multi lap, three round system where in the first round, everyone would set a time to determine positions 25–32. Then, the fastest 24 qualifiers would move on to the second round to determine positions 13–24. Lastly, the fastest 12 qualifiers would move on to the third round to determine positions 1–12.

Erik Jones, driving for Kyle Busch Motorsports, would win the pole after advancing from the preliminary rounds and setting the fastest time in Round 3, with a lap of 26.179, and an average speed of 137.515 mph (221.309 km/h).

Brandon Hightower, Caleb Roark, Norm Benning, and Cassie Gannis would fail to qualify.

=== Full qualifying results ===
Pos.	#	Driver	Team	Make	Time (R1)	Speed (R1)	Time (R2)	Speed (R2)	Time (R3)	Speed (R3)
1	4	Erik Jones (R)	Kyle Busch Motorsports	Toyota	26.473	135.988	26.305	136.856	26.179	137.515
2	19	Tyler Reddick	Brad Keselowski Racing	Ford	26.519	135.752	26.487	135.916	26.290	136.934
3	32	Justin Haley	Braun Motorsports	Chevrolet	26.804	134.308	26.517	135.762	26.320	136.778
4	88	Matt Crafton	ThorSport Racing	Toyota	26.718	134.741	26.401	136.358	26.350	136.622
5	9	William Byron	Kyle Busch Motorsports	Toyota	26.758	134.539	26.547	135.609	26.386	136.436
6	13	Cameron Hayley (R)	ThorSport Racing	Toyota	26.581	135.435	26.347	136.638	26.396	136.384
7	33	Brandon Jones (R)	GMS Racing	Chevrolet	27.124	132.724	26.331	136.721	26.453	136.090
8	51	Daniel Suárez (i)	Kyle Busch Motorsports	Toyota	26.696	134.852	26.433	136.193	26.460	136.054
9	00	Cole Custer	JR Motorsports	Chevrolet	26.721	134.725	26.451	136.101	26.469	136.008
10	17	Timothy Peters	Red Horse Racing	Toyota	27.023	133.220	26.523	135.731	26.508	135.808
11	8	John Hunter Nemechek (R)	SWM-NEMCO Motorsports	Chevrolet	26.616	135.257	26.498	135.859	26.525	135.721
12	11	Ben Kennedy	Red Horse Racing	Toyota	26.596	135.359	26.495	135.875	26.602	135.328
Eliminated from Round 2
13	14	Daniel Hemric (R)	NTS Motorsports	Chevrolet	26.909	133.784	26.558	135.552	–	–
14	31	Rico Abreu	NTS Motorsports	Chevrolet	26.772	134.469	26.588	135.399	–	–
15	23	Spencer Gallagher (R)	GMS Racing	Chevrolet	26.801	134.323	26.622	135.227	–	–
16	98	Johnny Sauter	ThorSport Racing	Toyota	26.730	134.680	26.648	135.095	–	–
17	54	Matt Tifft	Kyle Busch Motorsports	Toyota	26.654	135.064	26.671	134.978	–	–
18	15	Mason Mingus	Billy Boat Motorsports	Chevrolet	27.153	132.582	26.694	134.862	–	–
19	05	John Wes Townley	Athenian Motorsports	Chevrolet	26.760	134.529	26.727	134.695	–	–
20	5	Dalton Sargeant	Wauters Motorsports	Toyota	27.065	133.013	26.742	134.620	–	–
21	29	Austin Cindric	Brad Keselowski Racing	Ford	27.172	132.489	26.880	133.929	–	–
22	07	Ray Black Jr. (R)	SS-Green Light Racing	Chevrolet	27.266	132.033	26.959	133.536	–	–
23	02	Tyler Young	Young's Motorsports	Chevrolet	27.094	132.871	27.123	132.729	–	–
24	16	Chad Boat	Billy Boat Motorsports	Chevrolet	26.994	133.363	27.127	132.709	–	–
Eliminated from Round 1
25	50	Travis Kvapil	MAKE Motorsports	Chevrolet	27.356	131.598	–	–	–	–
26	36	Bobby Pierce	MB Motorsports	Chevrolet	27.509	130.866	–	–	–	–
27	1	Rubén Pardo	Rick Ware Racing	Chevrolet	27.571	130.572	–	–	–	–
Qualified by owner's points
28	94	Timmy Hill	Premium Motorsports	Chevrolet	27.697	129.978	–	–	–	–
29	10	Jennifer Jo Cobb	Jennifer Jo Cobb Racing	Chevrolet	28.100	128.114	–	–	–	–
30	08	Korbin Forrister (R)	BJMM with SS-Green Light Racing	Chevrolet	28.209	127.619	–	–	–	–
31	74	Jordan Anderson	Mike Harmon Racing	Chevrolet	28.337	127.042	–	–	–	–
32	63	Akinori Ogata	MB Motorsports	Chevrolet	28.524	126.210	–	–	–	–
Failed to qualify
33	45	Brandon Hightower	B. J. McLeod Motorsports	Chevrolet	27.776	129.608	–	–	–	–
34	0	Caleb Roark	Jennifer Jo Cobb Racing	Chevrolet	28.020	128.480	–	–	–	–
35	6	Norm Benning	Norm Benning Racing	Chevrolet	28.406	126.734	–	–	–	–
36	49	Cassie Gannis	Mike Harmon Racing	RAM	29.052	123.916	–	–	–	–
Official qualifying results
Official starting lineup

== Race results ==
Fin	St	#	Driver	Team	Make	Laps	Led	Status	Pts	Winnings
1	10	17	Timothy Peters	Red Horse Racing	Toyota	150	28	Running	47	$44,502
2	11	8	John Hunter Nemechek (R)	SWM-NEMCO Motorsports	Chevrolet	150	0	Running	42	$32,722
3	19	05	John Wes Townley	Athenian Motorsports	Chevrolet	150	0	Running	41	$24,226
4	8	51	Daniel Suárez (i)	Kyle Busch Motorsports	Toyota	150	0	Running	0	$17,000
5	2	19	Tyler Reddick	Brad Keselowski Racing	Ford	150	0	Running	39	$17,375
6	15	23	Spencer Gallagher (R)	GMS Racing	Chevrolet	150	0	Running	38	$16,287
7	3	32	Justin Haley	Braun Motorsports	Chevrolet	150	0	Running	37	$13,982
8	17	54	Matt Tifft	Kyle Busch Motorsports	Toyota	150	0	Running	36	$16,176
9	1	4	Erik Jones (R)	Kyle Busch Motorsports	Toyota	150	106	Running	37	$20,621
10	18	15	Mason Mingus	Billy Boat Motorsports	Chevrolet	150	0	Running	34	$16,988
11	6	13	Cameron Hayley (R)	ThorSport Racing	Toyota	150	0	Running	33	$15,844
12	24	16	Chad Boat	Billy Boat Motorsports	Chevrolet	149	0	Running	32	$13,455
13	23	02	Tyler Young	Young's Motorsports	Chevrolet	149	0	Running	31	$15,649
14	21	29	Austin Cindric	Brad Keselowski Racing	Ford	149	0	Running	30	$15,567
15	25	50	Travis Kvapil	MAKE Motorsports	Chevrolet	149	1	Running	30	$15,911
16	26	36	Bobby Pierce	MB Motorsports	Chevrolet	149	0	Running	28	$15,628
17	27	1	Rubén Pardo	Rick Ware Racing	Chevrolet	148	0	Running	27	$15,372
18	28	94	Timmy Hill	Premium Motorsports	Chevrolet	148	0	Running	26	$15,317
19	20	5	Dalton Sargeant	Wauters Motorsports	Toyota	148	0	Running	25	$13,012
20	22	07	Ray Black Jr. (R)	SS-Green Light Racing	Chevrolet	148	0	Running	24	$15,706
21	13	14	Daniel Hemric (R)	NTS Motorsports	Chevrolet	144	0	Running	23	$15,096
22	29	10	Jennifer Jo Cobb	Jennifer Jo Cobb Racing	Chevrolet	141	0	Running	22	$15,040
23	4	88	Matt Crafton	ThorSport Racing	Toyota	130	15	Accident	22	$14,680
24	12	11	Ben Kennedy	Red Horse Racing	Toyota	126	0	Running	20	$13,569
25	16	98	Johnny Sauter	ThorSport Racing	Toyota	120	0	Accident	19	$12,609
26	9	00	Cole Custer	JR Motorsports	Chevrolet	114	0	Running	18	$12,347
27	32	63	Akinori Ogata	MB Motorsports	Chevrolet	105	0	Suspension	17	$12,209
28	14	31	Rico Abreu	NTS Motorsports	Chevrolet	44	0	Accident	16	$11,878
29	31	74	Jordan Anderson	Mike Harmon Racing	Chevrolet	36	0	Engine	15	$11,768
30	30	08	Korbin Forrister (R)	BJMM with SS-Green Light Racing	Chevrolet	15	0	Accident	14	$11,268
31	5	9	William Byron	Kyle Busch Motorsports	Toyota	6	0	Accident	13	$9,768
32	7	33	Brandon Jones (R)	GMS Racing	Chevrolet	6	0	Accident	12	$8,768
Official race results

== Standings after the race ==
Drivers' Championship standings

	Pos	Driver	Points
	1	Erik Jones	861
1	2	Tyler Reddick	842 (-19)
1	3	Matt Crafton	829 (–32)
	4	Johnny Sauter	772 (–89)
	5	Timothy Peters	765 (–96)
	6	Cameron Hayley	731 (–130)
	7	Daniel Hemric	697 (–164)
	8	John Wes Townley	695 (–166)
	9	Ben Kennedy	650 (–211)
	10	Spencer Gallagher	644 (–217)
Official driver's standings

- Note: Only the first 10 positions are included for the driver standings.

Previous race: 2015 WinStar World Casino & Resort 350	NASCAR Camping World Truck Series; 2015 season	Next race: 2015 Ford EcoBoost 200
