= 2015 Careers for Veterans 200 =

13th race of the 2015 NASCAR Camping World Truck Series

Race details
- Race 13 of 23 of the 2015 NASCAR Camping World Truck Series
- Date: August 15, 2015
- Official name: 16th Annual Careers for Veterans 200
- Location: Michigan International Speedway, Brooklyn, Michigan
- Course: Permanent racing facility
- Course length: 2.0 miles (3.2 km)
- Distance: 100 laps, 200 mi (321 km)
- Scheduled distance: 100 laps, 200 mi (321 km)
- Average speed: 128.940 mph (207.509 km/h)

Pole position
Driver	Matt Crafton	ThorSport Racing
- Time: 39.024

Most laps led
Driver	Kyle Busch	Kyle Busch Motorsports
- Laps: 44

Winner
No. 51	Kyle Busch	Kyle Busch Motorsports

Television in the United States
- Network: FS1
- Announcers: Ralph Sheheen, Phil Parsons, and Michael Waltrip

Radio in the United States
- Radio: MRN

The 2015 Careers for Veterans 200 was the 13th stock car race of the 2015 NASCAR Camping World Truck Series, and the 16th iteration of the event. The race was held on Saturday, August 15, 2015, in Brooklyn, Michigan at Michigan International Speedway, a 2.0 mile (3.2 km) permanent tri-oval shaped racetrack. The race took the scheduled 100 laps to complete. Kyle Busch, driving for his team, Kyle Busch Motorsports, would make a late-race pass for the lead on Ryan Blaney with four laps to go, earning his 44th career NASCAR Camping World Truck Series win, and his second of the season. Busch dominated parts of the race as well, leading a race-high 44 laps. To fill out the podium, Blaney, driving for Brad Keselowski Racing, and Erik Jones, driving for Kyle Busch Motorsports, would finish 2nd and 3rd, respectively.

== Background ==
The layout of Michigan International Speedway, the circuit where the race was held.

Michigan International Speedway (MIS) is a 2 mi (3.2 km) moderate-banked D-shaped speedway located approximately four miles (6.4 km) south of the village of Brooklyn, Michigan, United States. Situated on more than 1,400 acres (5.7 km^{2}) in the scenic Irish Hills area of southeastern Michigan, the track is 70 miles (110 km) west of the center of Detroit, 40 miles (64 km) from Ann Arbor, and 60 miles (97 km) south and northwest of Lansing, Michigan and Toledo, Ohio, respectively. MIS is used primarily for NASCAR events. It is sometimes known as a sister track to Texas World Speedway, and was used as the basis of Auto Club Speedway. The track is owned by NASCAR. Michigan International Speedway is recognized as one of motorsports' premier facilities because of its wide racing surface and high banking (by open-wheel standards; the 18-degree banking is modest by stock car standards).

Michigan is the fastest track in NASCAR due to its wide, sweeping corners, long straightaways, and lack of a restrictor plate requirement; typical qualifying speeds are in excess of 200 mph (320 km/h) and corner entry speeds are anywhere from 215 to 220 mph (346 to 354 km/h) after the 2012 repaving of the track.

=== Entry list ===
- (R) denotes rookie driver.
- (i) denotes driver who is ineligible for series driver points.

#	Driver	Team	Make	Sponsor
00	Alex Bowman (i)	JR Motorsports	Chevrolet	Haas Automation
0	Caleb Roark	Jennifer Jo Cobb Racing	Chevrolet	Driven2Honor.org
1	Travis Kvapil	MAKE Motorsports	Chevrolet	Burnie Grill
02	Tyler Young	Young's Motorsports	Chevrolet	Randco, Young's Building Systems
03	Tim Viens	Mike Affarano Motorsports	Chevrolet	RaceDaySponsor.com
4	Erik Jones (R)	Kyle Busch Motorsports	Toyota	Toyota
05	John Wes Townley	Athenian Motorsports	Chevrolet	Zaxby's
6	Norm Benning	Norm Benning Racing	Chevrolet	Norm Benning Racing
07	Ray Black Jr. (R)	SS-Green Light Racing	Chevrolet	ScubaLife
08	Korbin Forrister (R)	BJMM with SS-Green Light Racing	Chevrolet	Trump for President
8	John Hunter Nemechek (R)	SWM-NEMCO Motorsports	Chevrolet	SWM-NEMCO Motorsports
10	Jennifer Jo Cobb	Jennifer Jo Cobb Racing	Chevrolet	Driven2Honor.org
11	Ben Kennedy	Red Horse Racing	Toyota	Local Motors
13	Cameron Hayley (R)	ThorSport Racing	Toyota	Carolina Nut Company
14	Daniel Hemric (R)	NTS Motorsports	Chevrolet	California Clean Power
15	Mason Mingus	Billy Boat Motorsports	Chevrolet	Call 811 Before You Dig
17	Timothy Peters	Red Horse Racing	Toyota	Red Horse Racing
19	Tyler Reddick	Brad Keselowski Racing	Ford	DrawTite
23	Spencer Gallagher (R)	GMS Racing	Chevrolet	Allegiant Travel Company
29	Ryan Blaney (i)	Brad Keselowski Racing	Ford	Cooper Standard Careers for Vets
30	Chad Finley	Rette Jones Racing	Ford	Auto Value
33	Austin Dillon (i)	GMS Racing	Chevrolet	Rheem, Young Supply Company
36	Justin Jennings	MB Motorsports	Chevrolet	Mittler Bros., Ski Soda
40	Todd Peck	Peck Motorsports	Chevrolet	Arthritis Foundation, OSS Health
45	B. J. McLeod	B. J. McLeod Motorsports	Chevrolet	Tilted Kilt
50	Tyler Tanner	MAKE Motorsports	Chevrolet	Shane Duncan Band
51	Kyle Busch (i)	Kyle Busch Motorsports	Toyota	Dollar General
54	Cody Coughlin	Kyle Busch Motorsports	Toyota	Jegs High Performance
63	Garrett Smithley	MB Motorsports	Chevrolet	SEGPAY, Mittler Bros.
74	Jordan Anderson	Mike Harmon Racing	Chevrolet	Tri-Analytics, Impact Race Products
88	Matt Crafton	ThorSport Racing	Toyota	Ideal Door, Menards
94	Wendell Chavous	Premium Motorsports	Chevrolet	Testoril
98	Johnny Sauter	ThorSport Racing	Toyota	Nextant Aerospace, Curb Records
Official entry list

== Practice ==
=== First practice ===
The first practice session was held on Friday, August 14, at 1:30 PM EST, and would last for 55 minutes. Daniel Hemric, driving for NTS Motorsports, would set the fastest time in the session, with a lap of 38.917, and an average speed of 185.009 mph (297.743 km/h).

Pos.	#	Driver	Team	Make	Time	Speed
1	14	Daniel Hemric (R)	NTS Motorsports	Chevrolet	38.917	185.009
2	13	Cameron Hayley (R)	ThorSport Racing	Toyota	39.091	184.186
3	4	Erik Jones (R)	Kyle Busch Motorsports	Toyota	39.113	184.082
Full first practice results

=== Final practice ===
The final practice session was held on Friday, August 14, at 3:00 PM EST, and would last for 1 hour and 25 minutes. Matt Crafton, driving for ThorSport Racing, would set the fastest time in the session, with a lap of 38.573, and an average speed of 186.659 mph (300.399 km/h).

Pos.	#	Driver	Team	Make	Time	Speed
1	88	Matt Crafton	ThorSport Racing	Toyota	38.573	186.659
2	14	Daniel Hemric (R)	NTS Motorsports	Chevrolet	38.666	186.210
3	13	Cameron Hayley (R)	ThorSport Racing	Toyota	38.729	185.907
Full final practice results

== Qualifying ==
Qualifying was held on Saturday, August 15, at 9:40 AM EST. The qualifying system used is a multi car, multi lap, two round system where in the first round, everyone would set a time to determine positions 13–32. Then, the fastest 12 qualifiers would move on to the second round to determine positions 1-12.

Matt Crafton, driving for ThorSport Racing, would win the pole after advancing from the preliminary round and setting the fastest time in Round 2, with a lap of 39.024, and an average speed of 184.502 mph (296.927 km/h).

Tim Viens was the only driver that failed to qualify.

=== Full qualifying results ===
Pos.	#	Driver	Team	Make	Time (R1)	Speed (R1)	Time (R2)	Speed (R2)
1	88	Matt Crafton	ThorSport Racing	Toyota	39.159	183.866	39.024	184.502
2	14	Daniel Hemric (R)	NTS Motorsports	Chevrolet	39.301	183.201	39.166	183.833
3	33	Austin Dillon (i)	GMS Racing	Chevrolet	39.473	182.403	39.249	183.444
4	11	Ben Kennedy	Red Horse Racing	Toyota	39.505	182.255	39.319	183.118
5	17	Timothy Peters	Red Horse Racing	Toyota	39.354	182.955	39.325	183.090
6	13	Cameron Hayley (R)	ThorSport Racing	Toyota	39.428	182.611	39.338	183.029
7	4	Erik Jones (R)	Kyle Busch Motorsports	Toyota	39.571	181.951	39.492	182.315
8	05	John Wes Townley	Athenian Motorsports	Chevrolet	39.630	181.681	39.529	182.145
9	98	Johnny Sauter	ThorSport Racing	Toyota	39.563	181.988	39.534	182.122
10	51	Kyle Busch (i)	Kyle Busch Motorsports	Toyota	39.630	181.681	39.628	181.690
11	19	Tyler Reddick	Brad Keselowski Racing	Ford	39.758	181.096	39.742	181.169
12	29	Ryan Blaney (i)	Brad Keselowski Racing	Ford	39.772	181.032	39.779	181.000
Eliminated from Round 1
13	02	Tyler Young	Young's Motorsports	Chevrolet	39.921	180.356	–	–
14	23	Spencer Gallagher (R)	GMS Racing	Chevrolet	39.928	180.325	–	–
15	30	Chad Finley	Rette Jones Racing	Ford	39.931	180.311	–	–
16	00	Alex Bowman (i)	JR Motorsports	Chevrolet	40.008	179.964	–	–
17	8	John Hunter Nemechek (R)	SWM-NEMCO Motorsports	Chevrolet	40.021	179.906	–	–
18	54	Cody Coughlin	Kyle Busch Motorsports	Toyota	40.165	179.261	–	–
19	63	Garrett Smithley	MB Motorsports	Chevrolet	40.275	178.771	–	–
20	1	Travis Kvapil	MAKE Motorsports	Chevrolet	40.355	178.417	–	–
21	07	Ray Black Jr. (R)	SS-Green Light Racing	Chevrolet	40.438	178.050	–	–
22	15	Mason Mingus	Billy Boat Motorsports	Chevrolet	40.477	177.879	–	–
23	74	Jordan Anderson	Mike Harmon Racing	Chevrolet	40.709	176.865	–	–
24	36	Justin Jennings	MB Motorsports	Chevrolet	40.863	176.199	–	–
25	0	Caleb Roark	Jennifer Jo Cobb Racing	Chevrolet	40.941	175.863	–	–
26	45	B. J. McLeod	B. J. McLeod Motorsports	Chevrolet	41.054	175.379	–	–
27	08	Korbin Forrister (R)	BJMM with SS-Green Light Racing	Chevrolet	41.080	175.268	–	–
Qualified by owner's points
28	10	Jennifer Jo Cobb	Jennifer Jo Cobb Racing	Chevrolet	41.475	173.599	–	–
29	40	Todd Peck	Peck Motorsports	Chevrolet	41.590	173.119	–	–
30	94	Wendell Chavous	Premium Motorsports	Chevrolet	42.259	170.378	–	–
31	6	Norm Benning	Norm Benning Racing	Chevrolet	42.586	169.070	–	–
32	50	Tyler Tanner	MAKE Motorsports	Chevrolet	42.676	168.713	–	–
Failed to qualify
33	03	Tim Viens	Mike Affarano Motorsports	Chevrolet	42.030	171.306	–	–
Official qualifying results
Official starting lineup

== Race results ==
Fin	St	#	Driver	Team	Make	Laps	Led	Status	Pts	Winnings
1	10	51	Kyle Busch (i)	Kyle Busch Motorsports	Toyota	100	44	Running	0	$43,447
2	12	29	Ryan Blaney (i)	Brad Keselowski Racing	Ford	100	8	Running	0	$36,614
3	7	4	Erik Jones (R)	Kyle Busch Motorsports	Toyota	100	16	Running	42	$26,735
4	9	98	Johnny Sauter	ThorSport Racing	Toyota	100	24	Running	41	$20,254
5	3	33	Austin Dillon (i)	GMS Racing	Chevrolet	100	4	Running	0	$15,653
6	1	88	Matt Crafton	ThorSport Racing	Toyota	100	0	Running	38	$19,792
7	2	14	Daniel Hemric (R)	NTS Motorsports	Chevrolet	100	4	Running	38	$16,325
8	5	17	Timothy Peters	Red Horse Racing	Toyota	100	0	Running	36	$16,241
9	11	19	Tyler Reddick	Brad Keselowski Racing	Ford	100	0	Running	35	$16,185
10	6	13	Cameron Hayley (R)	ThorSport Racing	Toyota	100	0	Running	34	$17,107
11	16	00	Alex Bowman (i)	JR Motorsports	Chevrolet	100	0	Running	0	$13,852
12	17	8	John Hunter Nemechek (R)	SWM-NEMCO Motorsports	Chevrolet	100	0	Running	32	$15,934
13	23	74	Jordan Anderson	Mike Harmon Racing	Chevrolet	100	0	Running	31	$15,850
14	19	63	Garrett Smithley	MB Motorsports	Chevrolet	100	0	Running	30	$15,795
15	13	02	Tyler Young	Young's Motorsports	Chevrolet	100	0	Running	29	$16,138
16	14	23	Spencer Gallagher (R)	GMS Racing	Chevrolet	99	0	Accident	28	$15,711
17	8	05	John Wes Townley	Athenian Motorsports	Chevrolet	99	0	Running	27	$15,799
18	20	1	Travis Kvapil	MAKE Motorsports	Chevrolet	98	0	Running	26	$15,572
19	28	10	Jennifer Jo Cobb	Jennifer Jo Cobb Racing	Chevrolet	98	0	Running	25	$15,515
20	18	54	Cody Coughlin	Kyle Busch Motorsports	Toyota	96	0	Running	24	$15,988
21	15	30	Chad Finley	Rette Jones Racing	Ford	96	0	Running	23	$13,210
22	27	08	Korbin Forrister (R)	BJMM with SS-Green Light Racing	Chevrolet	95	0	Running	22	$15,404
23	30	94	Wendell Chavous	Premium Motorsports	Chevrolet	95	0	Running	21	$15,376
24	22	15	Mason Mingus	Billy Boat Motorsports	Chevrolet	87	0	Accident	20	$14,099
25	4	11	Ben Kennedy	Red Horse Racing	Toyota	82	0	Accident	19	$14,220
26	21	07	Ray Black Jr. (R)	SS-Green Light Racing	Chevrolet	66	0	Running	18	$13,042
27	31	6	Norm Benning	Norm Benning Racing	Chevrolet	40	0	Rear Gear	17	$12,987
28	25	0	Caleb Roark	Jennifer Jo Cobb Racing	Chevrolet	19	0	Vibration	16	$12,747
29	32	50	Tyler Tanner	MAKE Motorsports	Chevrolet	16	0	Clutch	15	$12,692
30	26	45	B. J. McLeod	B. J. McLeod Motorsports	Chevrolet	15	0	Electrical	14	$12,192
31	29	40	Todd Peck	Peck Motorsports	Chevrolet	12	0	Rear Gear	13	$10,692
32	24	36	Justin Jennings	MB Motorsports	Chevrolet	6	0	Handling	12	$9,692
Official race results

== Standings after the race ==
Drivers' Championship standings

	Pos	Driver	Points
	1	Tyler Reddick	514
	2	Matt Crafton	506 (-8)
	3	Erik Jones	505 (–9)
	4	Johnny Sauter	461 (–53)
	5	Cameron Hayley	425 (–89)
1	6	Daniel Hemric	420 (–94)
1	7	Timothy Peters	416 (–98)
2	8	John Wes Townley	414 (–100)
	9	Spencer Gallagher	394 (–120)
	10	Ben Kennedy	381 (–133)
Official driver's standings

- Note: Only the first 10 positions are included for the driver standings.

Previous race: 2015 Pocono Mountains 150	NASCAR Camping World Truck Series; 2015 season	Next race: 2015 UNOH 200
