= 2016 Chevrolet Silverado 250 =

Race details
- Map of the racetrack
- Date: September 4, 2016
- Official name: 2016 Chevrolet Silverado 250
- Location: Canadian Tire Motorsport Park in Bowmanville, Ontario, Canada
- Course: Road Course
- Course length: 2.459 miles (3.957 km)
- Distance: 66 laps, 162.318 mi (261.225 km)
- Scheduled distance: 64 laps, 157.4 mi (253.47 km)

Pole position
Driver	Cole Custer	JR Motorsports
- Time: 1:19.175

Most laps led
Driver	Cole Custer	JR Motorsports
- Laps: 39

Winner
No. 8	John Hunter Nemechek	NEMCO Motorsports

Television in the United States
- Network: Fox Sports 1
- Announcers: Vince Welch, Phil Parsons, Michael Waltrip

The 2016 Chevrolet Silverado 250 was a NASCAR Camping World Truck Series race held at Canadian Tire Motorsport Park in Bowmanville, Ontario, Canada on Sunday September 4, 2016. The race was the 4th event held by the Truck Series at this racetrack. In the end, John Hunter Nemechek would win in an incredible finish over Cole Custer by .034 seconds. The race also became notable for the post-race scuffle between Nemechek and Custer.

== Background ==
=== Track ===
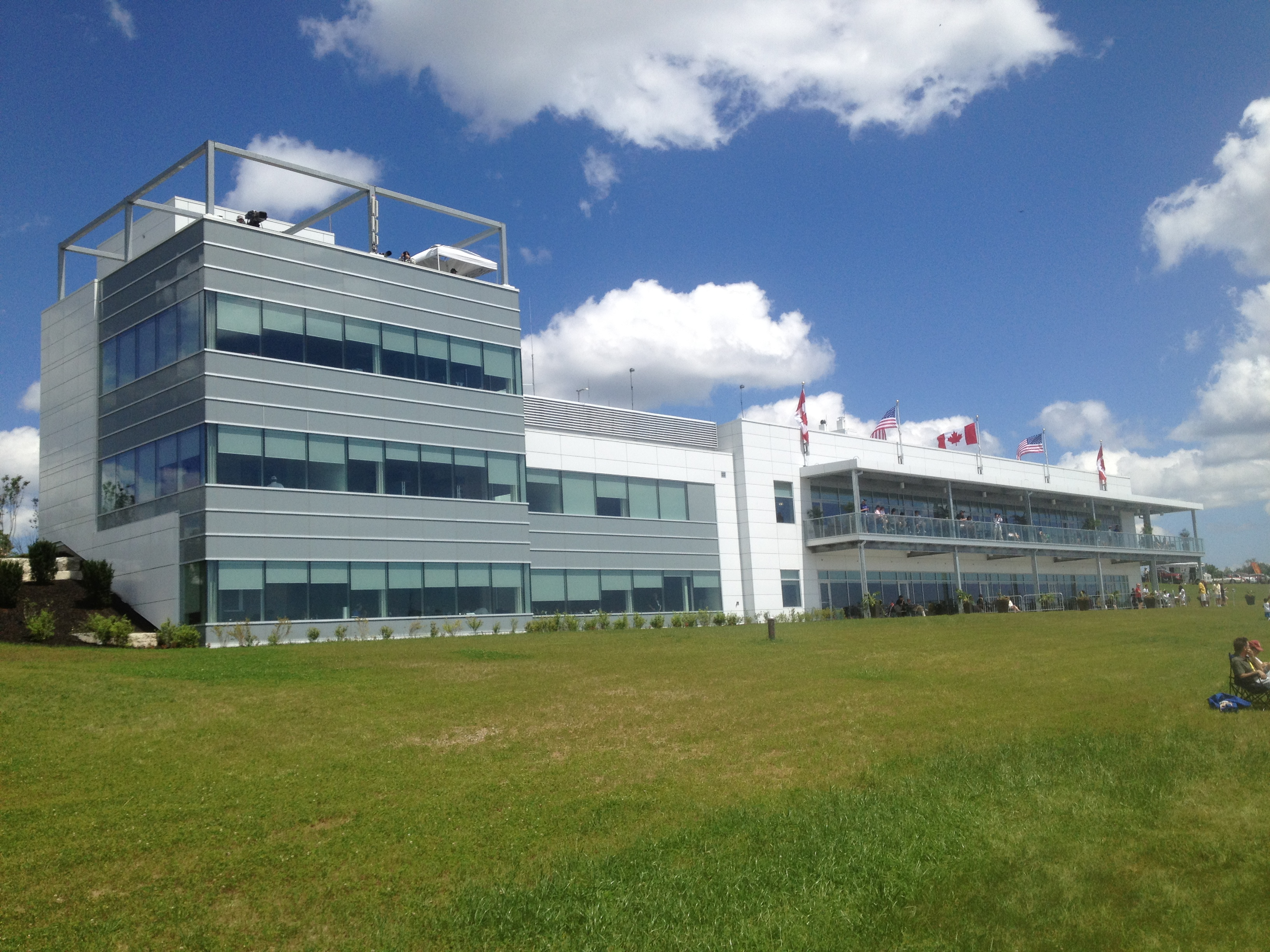
The event centre of Canadian Tire Motorsport Park, the track where the race was held.

Canadian Tire Motorsport Park is a multi-track motorsport venue located north of Bowmanville, in Ontario, Canada. The facility features a 2.459-mile (3.957 km), (length reduced through wider track re-surfacing done in 2003) 10-turn road course; a 2.9 km advance driver and race driver training facility with a quarter-mile skid pad (Driver Development Centre) and a 1.5 km kart track (Mosport Kartways). The name "Mosport" is a portmanteau of Motor Sport, came from the enterprise formed to build the track.

=== Entry list ===
- (R) denotes rookie driver
- (i) denotes driver who is ineligible for series driver points

#	Driver	Team	Make
00	Cole Custer (R)	JR Motorsports	Chevrolet
1	Jennifer Jo Cobb	Jennifer Jo Cobb Racing	Chevrolet
02	Tyler Young	Young's Motorsports	Chevrolet
2	Austin Cindric	Brad Keselowski Racing	Ford
4	Christopher Bell (R)	Kyle Busch Motorsports	Toyota
05	John Wes Townley	Athenian Motorsports	Chevrolet
07	Cody Ware (i)	SS-Green Light Racing	Chevrolet
8	John Hunter Nemechek	NEMCO Motorsports	Chevrolet
9	William Byron (R)	Kyle Busch Motorsports	Toyota
10	Caleb Roark	Jennifer Jo Cobb Racing	Chevrolet
11	Brett Moffitt	Red Horse Racing	Toyota
13	Cameron Hayley	ThorSport Racing	Toyota
17	Timothy Peters	Red Horse Racing	Toyota
19	Daniel Hemric	Brad Keselowski Racing	Ford
21	Johnny Sauter	GMS Racing	Chevrolet
22	Austin Wayne Self (R)	AM Racing	Toyota
23	Spencer Gallagher	GMS Racing	Chevrolet
24	Kaz Grala	GMS Racing	Chevrolet
29	Tyler Reddick	Brad Keselowski Racing	Ford
32	Justin Haley	Braun Motorsports	Chevrolet
33	Ben Kennedy	GMS Racing	Chevrolet
41	Ben Rhodes (R)	ThorSport Racing	Toyota
44	Tommy Joe Martins	Martins Motorsports	Chevrolet
49	D. J. Kennington (i)	Premium Motorsports	Chevrolet
50	Travis Kvapil	MAKE Motorsports	Chevrolet
51	Gary Klutt	Kyle Busch Motorsports	Toyota
63	Norm Benning	Norm Benning Racing	Chevrolet
66	Jordan Anderson	Bolen Motorsports	Chevrolet
71	Camden Murphy (i)	Contreras Motorsports	Chevrolet
81	Ryan Truex	Hattori Racing Enterprises	Toyota
88	Matt Crafton	ThorSport Racing	Toyota
98	Rico Abreu (R)	ThorSport Racing	Toyota
Official entry list

== Qualifying ==
Cole Custer won the pole for the race with a time of 1:19.175 and a speed of 111.808 mph.

Grid	No.	Driver	Team	Manufacturer	Time	Speed
1	00	Cole Custer (R)	JR Motorsports	Chevrolet	1:19.175	111.808
2	2	Austin Cindric	Brad Keselowski Racing	Ford	1:19.585	111.232
3	19	Daniel Hemric	Brad Keselowski Racing	Ford	1:19.777	110.964
4	24	Kaz Grala	GMS Racing	Chevrolet	1:19.884	110.816
5	9	William Byron (R)	Kyle Busch Motorsports	Toyota	1:19.994	110.663
6	11	Brett Moffitt	Red Horse Racing	Toyota	1:20.282	110.266
7	13	Cameron Hayley	ThorSport Racing	Toyota	1:20.331	110.199
8	29	Tyler Reddick	Brad Keselowski Racing	Ford	1:20.334	110.195
9	23	Spencer Gallagher	GMS Racing	Chevrolet	1:20.342	110.184
10	41	Ben Rhodes (R)*	ThorSport Racing	Toyota	1:20.725	109.661
11	21	Johnny Sauter	GMS Racing	Chevrolet	1:20.813	109.542
12	17	Timothy Peters	Red Horse Racing	Toyota	1:20.839	109.507
13	8	John Hunter Nemechek	NEMCO Motorsports	Chevrolet	1:20.327	110.205
14	33	Ben Kennedy	GMS Racing	Chevrolet	1:20.396	110.110
15	51	Gary Klutt	Kyle Busch Motorsports	Toyota	1:20.427	110.068
16	4	Christopher Bell (R)*	Kyle Busch Motorsports	Toyota	1:20.433	110.059
17	88	Matt Crafton*	ThorSport Racing	Toyota	1:20.578	109.861
18	32	Justin Haley	Braun Motorsports	Chevrolet	1:20.608	109.820
19	98	Rico Abreu (R)	ThorSport Racing	Toyota	1:20.792	109.570
20	81	Ryan Truex	Hattori Racing Enterprises	Toyota	1:21.200	109.020
21	05	John Wes Townley	Athenian Motorsports	Chevrolet	1:21.742	108.297
22	22	Austin Wayne Self (R)*	AM Racing	Toyota	1:21.993	107.965
23	49	D. J. Kennington (i)	Premium Motorsports	Chevrolet	1:22.185	107.713
24	66	Jordan Anderson	Bolen Motorsports	Chevrolet	1:22.558	107.226
25	02	Tyler Young	Young's Motorsports	Chevrolet	1:22.793	106.922
26	07	Cody Ware (i)	SS-Green Light Racing	Chevrolet	1:23.086	106.545
27	50	Travis Kvapil*	MAKE Motorsports	Chevrolet	1:25.039	104.098
28	44	Tommy Joe Martins*	Martins Motorsports	Chevrolet	1:25.543	103.485
29	71	Camden Murphy (i)	Contreras Motorsports	Chevrolet	1:27.326	101.372
30	63	Norm Benning*	Norm Benning Racing	Chevrolet	1:27.665	100.980
31	10	Caleb Roark	Jennifer Jo Cobb Racing	Chevrolet	1:38.128	90.213
32	1	Jennifer Jo Cobb*	Jennifer Jo Cobb Racing	Chevrolet	N/A	N/A
Official Qualifying results

* – Jennifer Jo Cobb, Christopher Bell, Austin Wayne Self, Ben Rhodes, Tommy Joe Martins, Travis Kvapil, Norm Benning, and Matt Crafton all had to move to the rear due to unapproved adjustments.

== Race ==
Pole sitter Cole Custer led the first lap of the race. On lap 8, the first caution of the race flew when Ben Rhodes crashed into the tire barriers in turn 8. On the restart, Custer kept his lead from Daniel Hemric. On lap 26, the second caution flew when the 20 minute caution clock, that was invented before the season started, expired. On the restart on lap 30, Custer kept his lead from 2nd place Hemric. On the next lap on lap 31, Hemric took the lead when Custer went to pit road to make his pit stop. On the next lap, Hemric and 2nd place Austin Cindric also went to make their pitstops giving Matt Crafton the lead. On lap 36, Crafton made his pit stop giving the lead to Spencer Gallagher. Gallagher then pitted on lap 38 giving his lead to John Hunter Nemechek. With 21 laps to go, the third caution flew when the caution clock expired for the second and final time of the race. Nemechek kept his lead on the restart with 17 laps to go. With 16 to go, Tyler Reddick got spun by Kaz Grala in turn 8. Reddick kept his truck going and no caution was flown. With 8 to go, the fourth caution flew for a 5 truck crash in turns 5 a and b. It started when Rico Abreu turned Cameron Hayley in 5a when Abreu clipped the grass and came up into Hayley turning both of them around. Abreu then clipped Gary Klutt giving Klutt some drivers side damage before Hayley came down and collected Ryan Truex and Brett Moffitt.

=== Final laps ===
The race restarted with 8 laps to go. But out of turn 1, Kaz Grala got hit by Matt Crafton and then turned by Christopher Bell and hit the wall on the right side of the track collecting Rico Abreu bringing out the 5th caution. The race restarted with 4 laps to go with Cole Custer being the new race leader. But on the same lap, Travis Kvapil's truck stalled bringing out the 6th and final caution of the race and setting up an overtime finish. On the restart, Custer kept his lead while Nemechek fell back to third. Nemechek passed Spencer Gallagher in turn 7 to get second place back and set up a fantastic finish against Cole Custer. Before they took the white flag, Gallagher got turned by Austin Cindric in turn 10 but no caution was flown, On the final lap, Custer was ahead of Nemechek by .712 seconds in turn 1. But Nemechek closed the gap on Custer in turns 2 and 3. Nemechek soon made up a lot of ground on Custer in turns 5a and b. Nemechek attempted to bump and run Custer in turn 8 but failed. Nemechek tried again in turn 9 but Custer still had the lead as Nemechek tried to look into Custer's left side. In turn 10, Nemechek tried to cross-over Custer and hooked him in the left rear sending him up the race track and Nemechek got side by side with Custer. Coming to the checkered, Nemechek turned left into Custer pinning him against the wall and the two went through the grass making contact while Austin Cindric spun in the last turn behind them. Nemechek crossed the line first by .034 seconds in front of Custer.

=== Post race ===
Although Nemechek crossed the finish line first, a winner was still to be determined. The unofficial results posted that the third place truck in Daniel Hemric actually won the race and Nemechek and Custer's positions didn't count due to the trucks not getting picked up by the electric timing and scoring. Believing he won the race, Nemechek did burnouts, got out of his truck, and went to the flag stand waiting for the flagman to give the checkered flag to him. While he was waiting, Nemechek looked to his left and saw that Custer was running towards him after Custer crawled out of his truck from the pit. Nemechek attempted to find a way to dodge him but instead braced himself for the impact. Custer grabbed Nemechek's helmet and tackled Nemechek to the ground. Both were separated by their own crews and NASCAR Officials. Eventually, NASCAR declared that Nemechek won the race, his second win of 2016. Custer, Daniel Hemric, Matt Crafton, and Christopher Bell rounded out the top 5 while Tyler Reddick, Johnny Sauter, Ben Kennedy, Cameron Hayley, and William Byron rounded out the top 10. "We didn't wreck him for the win," Nemechek said. "Rubbings Racing."

== Race results ==
Pos	No.	Driver	Team	Manufacturer	Laps	Led	Status	Points
1	8	John Hunter Nemechek	NEMCO Motorsports	Chevrolet	66	20	running	36
2	00	Cole Custer (R)	JR Motorsports	Chevrolet	66	39	running	33
3	19	Daniel Hemric	Brad Keselowski Racing	Ford	66	1	running	31
4	88	Matt Crafton	ThorSport Racing	Toyota	66	4	running	30
5	4	Christopher Bell (R)	Kyle Busch Motorsports	Toyota	66	0	running	28
6	29	Tyler Reeddick	Brad Keselowski Racing	Ford	66	0	running	27
7	21	Johnny Sauter	GMS Racing	Chevrolet	66	0	running	26
8	33	Ben Kennedy	GMS Racing	Chevrolet	66	0	running	25
9	13	Cameron Hayley	ThorSport Racing	Toyota	66	0	running	24
10	9	William Byron	Kyle Busch Motorsports	Toyota	66	0	running	23
11	51	Gary Klutt	Kyle Busch Motorsports	Toyota	66	0	running	22
12	05	John Wes Townley	Athenian Motorsports	Chevrolet	66	0	running	21
13	66	Jordan Anderson	Bolen Motorsports	Chevrolet	66	0	running	20
14	49	D. J. Kennington (i)	Premium Motorsports	Chevrolet	66	0	running	0
15	22	Austin Wayne Self (R)	AM Racing	Toyota	66	0	running	18
16	11	Brett Moffitt	Red Horse Racing	Toyota	66	0	running	17
17	07	Cody Ware (i)	SS-Green Light Racing	Chevrolet	66	0	running	0
18	17	Timothy Peters	Red Horse Racing	Toyota	66	0	running	15
19	44	Tommy Joe Martins	Martins Motorsports	Chevrolet	66	0	running	14
20	63	Norm Benning	Norm Benning Racing	Chevrolet	66	0	running	13
21	81	Ryan Truex	Hattori Racing Enterprises	Toyota	66	0	running	12
22	23	Spencer Gallagher	GMS Racing	Chevrolet	66	2	running	12
23	2	Austin Cindric	Brad Keselowski Racing	Ford	66	0	running	10
24	1	Jennifer Jo Cobb	Jennifer Jo Cobb Racing	Chevrolet	64	0	running	9
25	50	Travis Kvapil	MAKE Motorsports	Chevrolet	60	0	engine	8
26	24	Kaz Grala	GMS Racing	Chevrolet	56	0	crash	7
27	98	Rico Abreu (R)	ThorSport Racing	Toyota	52	0	crash	6
28	02	Tyler Young	Young's Motorsports	Chevrolet	28	0	electrical	5
29	32	Justin Haley	Braun Motorsports	Chevrolet	9	0	clutch	4
30	41	Ben Rhodes (R)	ThorSport Racing	Toyota	6	0	crash	3
31	71	Camden Murphy (i)	Contreras Motorsports	Chevrolet	3	0	clutch	0
32	10	Caleb Roark	Jennifer Jo Cobb Racing	Chevrolet	3	0	brakes	1
Official Race results

Previous race: 2016 Careers for Veterans 200	NASCAR Camping World Truck Series; 2016 season	Next race: 2016 American Ethanol E15 225
