= USA Cares =

American non-profit organization

USA Cares is an American non-profit organization in Radcliff, Kentucky. It was founded in 2003 to give financial and other help to former members of the armed forces of the United States. George W. Bush spoke of its work during a speech at Fort Bragg on July 4, 2006. The organization has a 4 star rating on Charity Navigator.

== Programs ==
USA Cares provides programs and services to veterans, service members and their family members including career transition assistance, corporate fellowship programs, grants and financial education. The organization provides emergency financial assistance and training including for suicide prevention.

Through a partnership with The Homeowners Preservation Foundation, USA Cares has saved hundreds of military homes from foreclosure. USA Cares is funded through corporations, organizations, and individual contributions.

From 2011 until 2023, USA Cares provided more than 11,000 military households with $12,388,759.36 in financial aid. In 2023 it recorded that it provided $2,954,705 to 924 veterans and their family members, including 573 mortgage payments, 213 utility payments, 206 vehicle payments, and 142 families with food.

In September 2024, USA Cares received a $2 million appropriation from the Kentucky Legislature. The funds will be used for housing assistance, food assistance as well as vehicle assistance for its members.

== The Warrior Treatment Today ==
The program helps service members who suffer from post-traumatic stress disorder (PTSD) or traumatic brain injury (TBI) who cannot afford to stop working for treatment purposes.

The program received a $250,000 grant from the Meadows Foundation of Dallas Texas.

USA Cares reported revenue of $6,555,741 and expenses of $4,669,899 for the year 2024, with net assets of $4,165,665.

== Members ==
USA Cares Executive Director is Bill Nelson and Regional Manager is Steven R. Silver. In 2024, Matt Castor was the Vice President of USA Cares.
