= Jennifer Jo Cobb Racing =

NASCAR team

- Owner: Jennifer Jo Cobb
- Base: Mooresville, North Carolina
- Series: NASCAR Craftsman Truck Series
- Race drivers: 10. Jennifer Jo Cobb (part-time)
- Manufacturer: Chevrolet
- Opened: 2010

Career
- Debut: 2010 NextEra Energy Resources 250 (Daytona)
- Latest race: 2024 Heart of America 200 (Kansas)
- Races competed: Total: 331; Xfinity Series: 21; Truck Series: 310
- Drivers' Championships: Total: 0 Xfinity Series: 0 Truck Series: 0
- Race victories: Total: 0 Xfinity Series: 0 Truck Series: 0
- Pole positions: Total: 0 Xfinity Series: 0 Truck Series: 0

Jennifer Jo Cobb Racing (also known as JJC Racing) is an American professional stock car racing team that currently competes part-time in the NASCAR Craftsman Truck Series. The team is based in Mooresville, North Carolina and is owned by Jennifer Jo Cobb, who also serves as the team's primary driver.

The team runs on one of the smaller budgets in the Truck Series, one that Cobb estimated in 2018 at between $750,000 and $1 million USD.

== Craftsman Truck Series ==
=== Truck No. 0 history ===
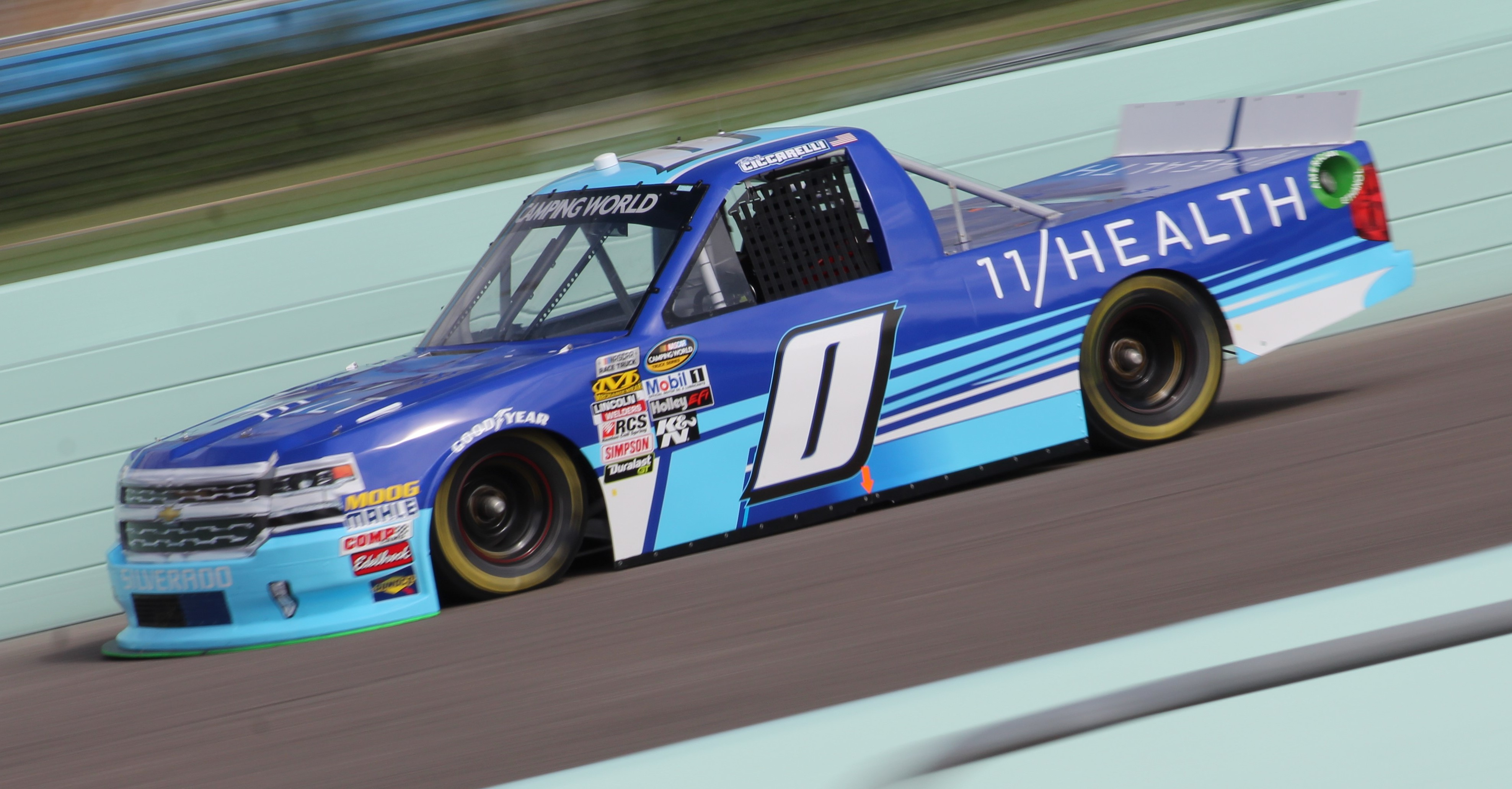
Ray Ciccarelli in the No. 0 for the team at Homestead in 2018.

The No. 0 team has been used primarily as a start and park team by multiple drivers, primarily young rookies. On two occasions the truck has been run by Joe Cobb, Jennifer's father. Both entries occurred at the Mudsummer Classic.

For 2014, Caleb Roark ran with the team, typically running the first few laps before retiring to the garage. Roark would do the same thing in 2015, though Scott Lagasse Jr. placed 15th at Homestead in the truck, being the last truck on the lead lap in a fully sponsored entry.

The No. 0 team was revived in 2017 at Texas Motor Speedway in June, as the field had less than 32 trucks. The truck was driven by Tommy Regan. The 0 returned for Bryce Napier at Gateway, while Cobb failed to qualify the 0 at Iowa. After skipping Kentucky, the No. 0 returned at Eldora with Korbin Forrister driving in a partnership between Cobb's team and SS-Green Light Racing. The team ran Pocono with Matt Mills as the driver. ARCA driver Ray Ciccarelli drove the No. 0 at Michigan after making his debut at Eldora in the No. 10. He would later attempt four more races for the team in that truck for the rest of the year at New Hampshire and then the last three races of the season at Texas, Phoenix, and Homestead.

==== Truck No. 0 results ====
Year	Driver	No.	Make	1	2	3	4	5	6	7	8	9	10	11	12	13	14	15	16	17	18	19	20	21	22	23	24	25	Owners	Pts
2011	Wayne Edwards	0	Ford	DAY	PHO	DAR	MAR	NSH	DOV	CLT	KAN	TEX	KEN	IOW	NSH	IRP	POC	MCH	BRI	ATL	CHI	NHA	KEN	LVS; 31	TAL	MAR			76th	0
2011	T. J. Bell	0	Ford																								TEX; 32	HOM	76th	0
2012	Jake Crum	0	Ram	DAY; DNQ	MAR	CAR	KAN	CLT	DOV																				47th	70
2012	Chris Lafferty	0	Ram							TEX; 34		IOW; 34		POC; 35															47th	70
2012	Chris Lafferty	0	Ford															IOW; 35											47th	70
2012	Jennifer Jo Cobb	0	Ram								KEN; DNQ																		47th	70
2012	T. J. Bell	0	Ram										CHI; 34																47th	70
2012	T. J. Bell	0	Ford												MCH; 35														47th	70
2012	Brandon Knupp	0	Ford													BRI; DNQ													47th	70
2012	Blake Koch	0	Ford														ATL; 35		KEN; 36	LVS	TAL	MAR; Wth	TEX; DNQ	PHO; 36	HOM; 36				47th	70
2013	Scott Saunders	0	Ram	DAY	MAR	CAR	KAN; 36	CLT																					39th	117
2013	Chris Lafferty	0	Ram						DOV; 35	TEX; Wth			ELD; Wth	POC; 34	MCH; 26	BRI													39th	117
2013	Chris Lafferty	0	Ford								KEN; 36	IOW; 35																	39th	117
2013	Chris Lafferty	0	Chevy														MSP; 30	IOW; 36	CHI; 35	LVS; 29	TAL	MAR	TEX; 35	PHO	HOM; Wth				39th	117
2014	Ryan Ellis	0	Chevy	DAY	MAR	KAN; 28		DOV; 34	TEX; 27		KEN; 32																		30th	237
2014	Willie Allen	0	Chevy				CLT; 32																						30th	237
2014	Caleb Roark	0	Chevy							GTW; 31				POC; 31	MCH; 29	BRI		CHI; 28	NHA; 28	LVS; 29	TAL	MAR	TEX; 30	PHO; Wth	HOM; 36				30th	237
2014	Caleb Roark	0	Ram									IOW; 35					MSP; 28												30th	237
2014	Joe Cobb	0	Ram										ELD; DNQ																30th	237
2015	Caleb Roark	0	Chevy	DAY	ATL	MAR	KAN; 32	CLT	DOV			IOW; 32	KEN	ELD	POC; 32	MCH; 28	BRI; DNQ	MSP	CHI; 31	NHA; 31	LVS; 30	TAL		TEX; 32	PHO; DNQ	HOM			33rd	135
2015	Adam Edwards	0	Chevy							TEX; 30	GTW; 31																		33rd	135
2015	Brad Foy	0	Chevy																				MAR; Wth						33rd	135
2017	Tommy Regan	0	Chevy	DAY	ATL	MAR	KAN	CLT	DOV	TEX; 28								MSP; 32	CHI; 28										35th	116
2017	Bryce Napier	0	Chevy								GTW; 20																		35th	116
2017	Jennifer Jo Cobb	0	Chevy									IOW; DNQ	KEN													HOM; 31			35th	116
2017	Korbin Forrister	0	Chevy											ELD; 28															35th	116
2017	Matt Mills	0	Chevy												POC; 27						LVS; 25	TAL	MAR						35th	116
2017	Ray Ciccarelli	0	Chevy													MCH; 26	BRI			NHA; 29				TEX; 28	PHO; 26				35th	116
2018	Joey Gase	0	Chevy	DAY	ATL; 31			DOV; Wth	KAN; 31	CLT																			42nd	69
2018	Mike Senica	0	Chevy			LVS; 30	MAR																						42nd	69
2018	Camden Murphy	0	Chevy								TEX; 31	IOW; DNQ	GTW; DNQ	CHI; 30	KEN; 31		POC; 29	MCH; DNQ	BRI; Wth		LVS; Wth			TEX; Wth	PHO				42nd	69
2018	Ray Ciccarelli	0	Chevy													ELD; DNQ						TAL; DNQ	MAR; DNQ			HOM; 25			42nd	69
2018	Justin Kunz	0	Chevy																	MSP; 26									42nd	69
2019	Jennifer Jo Cobb	0	Chevy	DAY	ATL	LVS	MAR	TEX	DOV	KAN; 23	CLT	TEX	IOW; 25																44th	58
2019	Gregory Rayl	0	Chevy											GTW; 32															44th	58
2019	Joey Gase	0	Chevy												CHI; 31	KEN													44th	58
2019	Daniel Sasnett	0	Chevy														POC; 29	ELD	MCH; DNQ	BRI		LVS; Wth	TAL						44th	58
2019	Ray Ciccarelli	0	Chevy																		MSP; 29								44th	58
2019	Cody McMahan	0	Chevy																					MAR; 32	PHO	HOM			44th	58

=== Truck No. 1 history ===
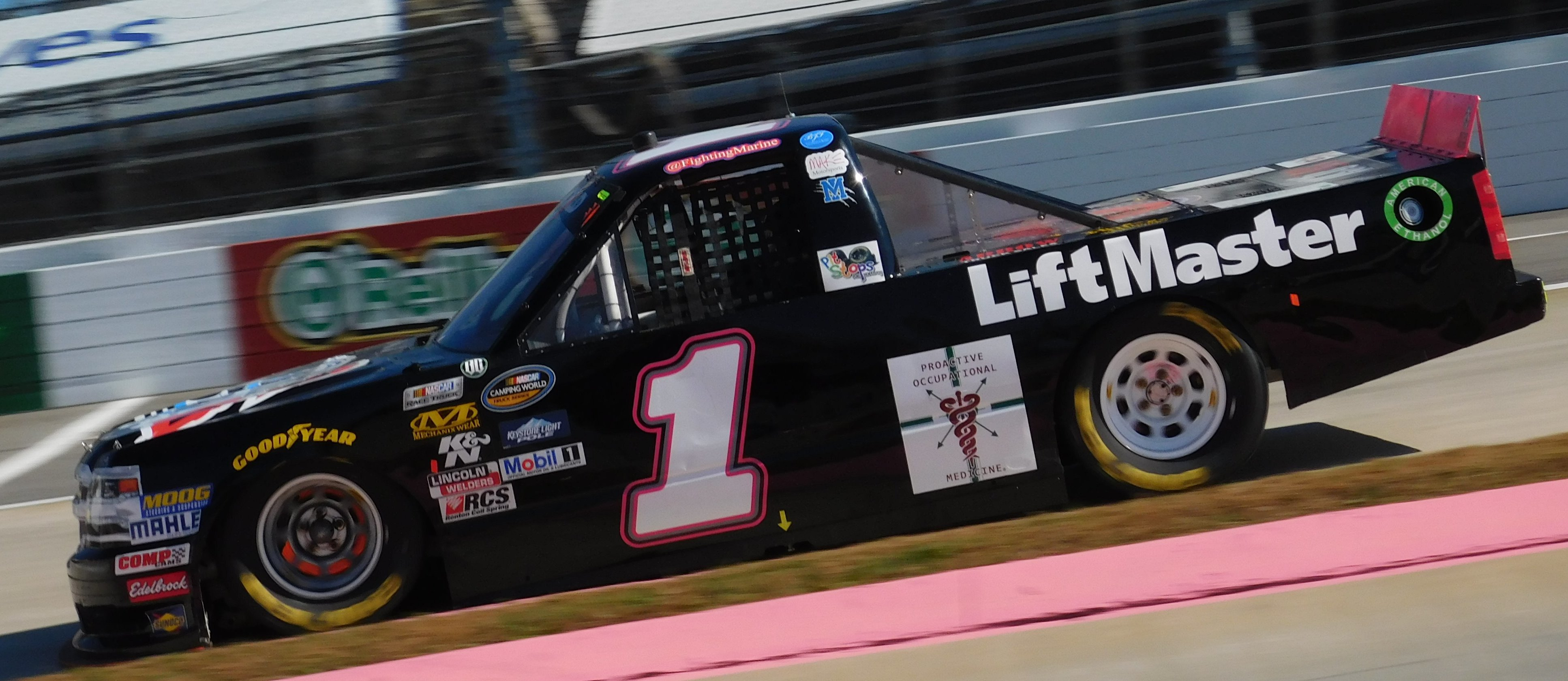
Josh White drove the No. 1 for Cobb and MAKE at the fall Martinsville race in 2016.

In 2016, after several DNQ's early in the season, JJCR formed a partnership with MAKE Motorsports which saw Cobb move from her No. 10 to MAKE's No. 1 to put her in a better position to qualify for races with the large entry lists the Truck Series saw that year. In the No. 1, Cobb attempted 11 races, earning a best finish of 17th at Michigan International Speedway. She still failed to make the field in one race (Talladega). Cobb ran all but three races for the rest of the year in the No. 1. Those three where she was not in it were the Bristol night race, where Clay Greenfield drove the truck instead in a partnership between his own team, Cobb's, and MAKE's, Martinsville in October, where she stepped out of the truck that weekend to allow ARCA driver Josh White to make his Truck debut that weekend, and the season-finale at Homestead, when Cobb was back in the No. 10 and Travis Kvapil drove the No. 1 (under MAKE's ownership).

==== Truck No. 1 results ====
Year	Driver	No.	Make	1	2	3	4	5	6	7	8	9	10	11	12	13	14	15	16	17	18	19	20	21	22	23	Owners	Pts
2016	Jennifer Jo Cobb	1	Ford	DAY	ATL	MAR	KAN	DOV	CLT	TEX	IOW; 28	GTW; 29		ELD; 26	POC; 28		MCH; 17	MSP; 24	CHI; 22	NHA; 25	LVS; 27	TAL; DNQ		TEX; 30	PHO; 24	HOM	31st	134
2016	Caleb Roark	1	Ford										KEN; 32														31st	134
2016	Clay Greenfield	1	Ram													BRI; DNQ											31st	134
2016	Josh White	1	Ford																				MAR; 32				31st	134

=== Truck No. 8 history ===
For the second race at Martinsville Speedway in the 2012 season, Cobb formed a partnership with Eddie Sharp Racing. She ran under her traditional Jennifer Jo Cobb Racing banner with Ram as the manufacturer. She finished in 34th, completing 95 laps, and retiring due to suspension issues. Chris Lafferty occupied her usual No. 10 truck.

==== Truck No. 8 results ====
Year	Driver	No.	Make	1	2	3	4	5	6	7	8	9	10	11	12	13	14	15	16	17	18	19	20	21	22	Owners	Pts
2012	Jennifer Jo Cobb	8	Ram	DAY	MAR; 34	CAR	KAN	CLT	DOV	TEX	KEN	IOW	CHI	POC	MCH	BRI	ATL	IOW	KEN	LVS	TAL	MAR	TEX	PHO	HOM	37th*	150*

Owner's points results for Eddie Sharp Racing

=== Truck No. 10 history ===
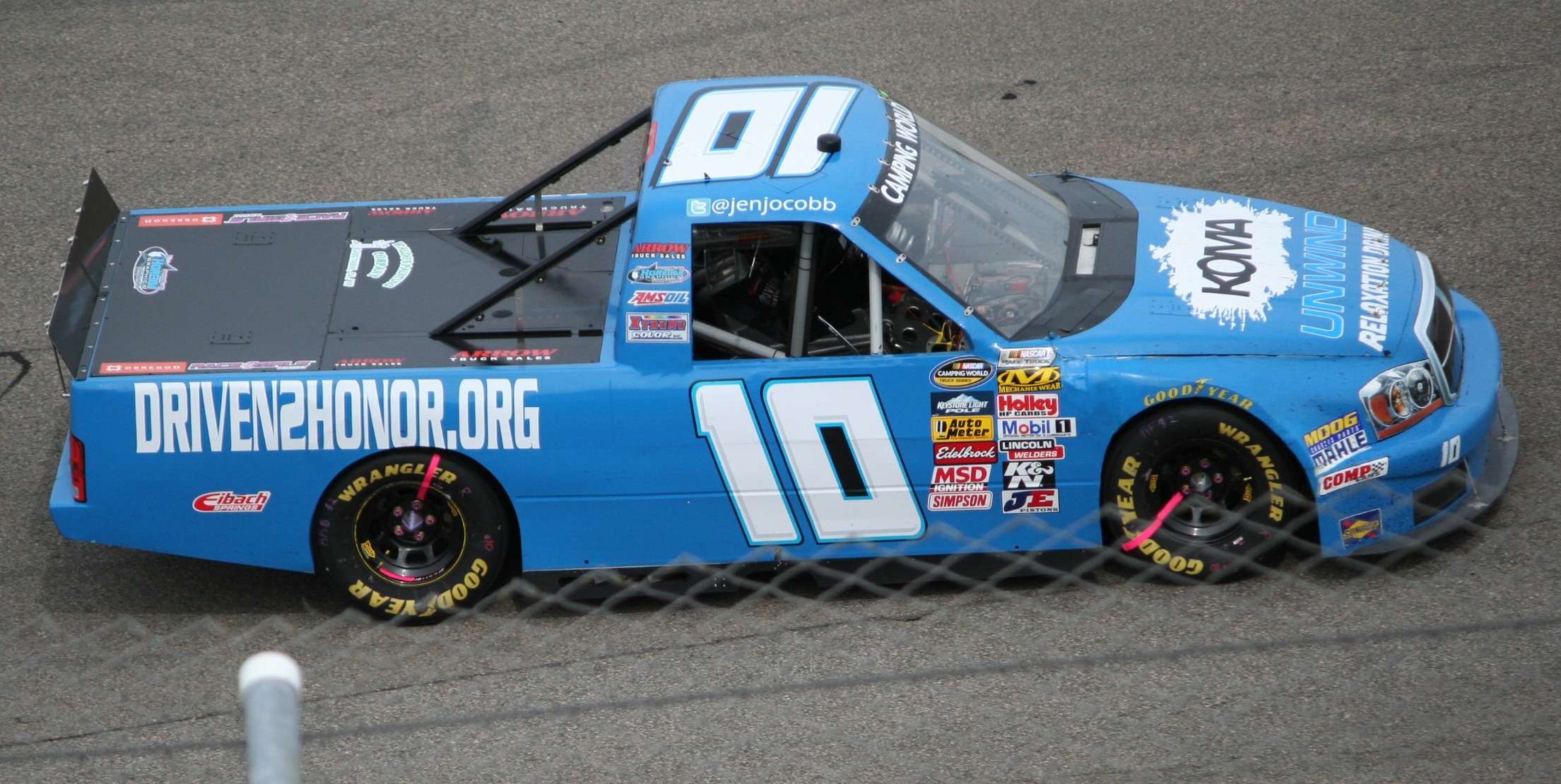
JJC Racing's 2013 truck at Rockingham Speedway

In 2010 Jennifer Jo Cobb announced that she had bought the assets of the No. 10 truck from Circle Bar Racing and would run the full season. The team made their debut at the 2010 NextEra Energy Resources 250 where they finished a disappointing 34th after being involved in a first lap crash. Cobb's team would however make every race that season with a best finish of 14th on two separate occasions. At the end of the season, Cobb would finish a record 17th in the points, a highest at the time by any woman in a top tier NASCAR series.

For the 2011 season the team only made 12 of the 25 races on the schedule due to Cobb's involvement in the Nationwide Series. The teams' best finish was 6th in the season opening race at Daytona and is to date the team's only top ten finish. Also during the season the points for the No. 10 truck had been given to Chase Mattioli and his race team.

In 2012 the team entered every race on the schedule, making 15 of the scheduled 22 races. However, during the season, the team faced numerous mechanical failures and only managed a season best finish of 16th at Kentucky. The No. 10 saw a major drop in team performance as they finished the season with an average finish of 27.5.

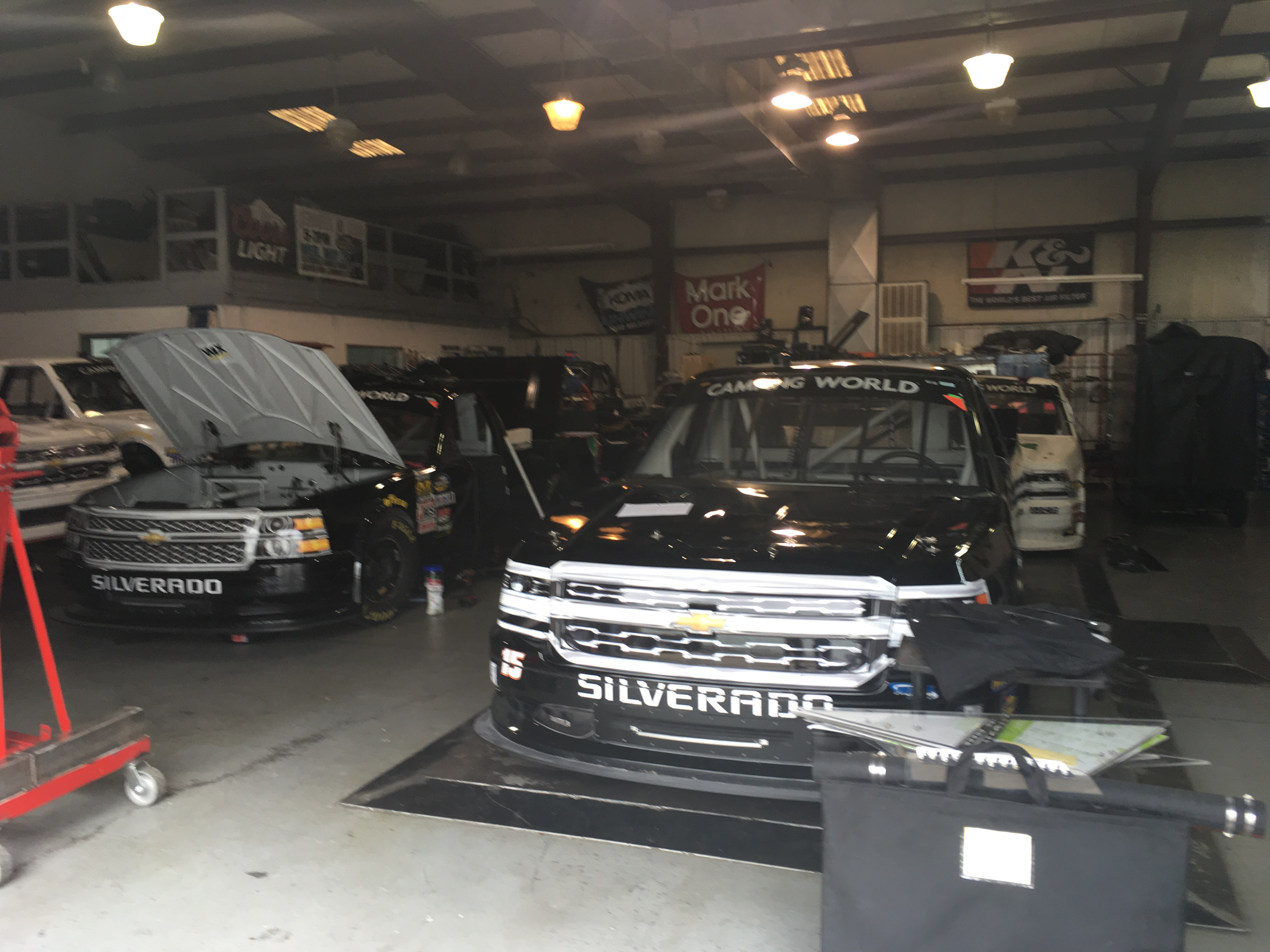
Trucks inside the Jennifer Jo Cobb Racing shop

2013 saw much of the same for the team as they ended the season with an average finish of 27.6 and making just 16 of the 22 races. The team also team also suffered 6 engine failures during the season and 4 additional DNF's for a total of 10, a career high. Cobb managed a season best finish of 17th at her hometown track of Kansas with sponsorship from Mark One Electric.

2014 saw a major improvement in performance by the team. Cobb only failed to qualify for one race on the schedule, the Mudsummer Classic. In addition the team suffered just 2 DNF's and garnered an average finish of 23rd.

2015 was another season of improvement for Cobb and her No. 10 team. They qualified for every single race for the first time and compiled an average start of 26.1 along with an average finish of 23.4. In addition, Cobb made her 100th Truck Series start at the 2015 WinStar World Casino & Resort 400.

In 2016, the truck had a drop in performance, which can be attributed to the large field sizes the series saw that year. After Texas in June, Cobb switched to the No. 1 MAKE Motorsports truck in a partnership between her team and theirs, and the No. 10 was used mostly as a start and park truck for Caleb Roark and other drivers instead of the No. 0. In 23 races, the No. 10 truck had 9 DNQs, 9 DNFs, and a best finish of 24th twice (Kentucky and Kansas).

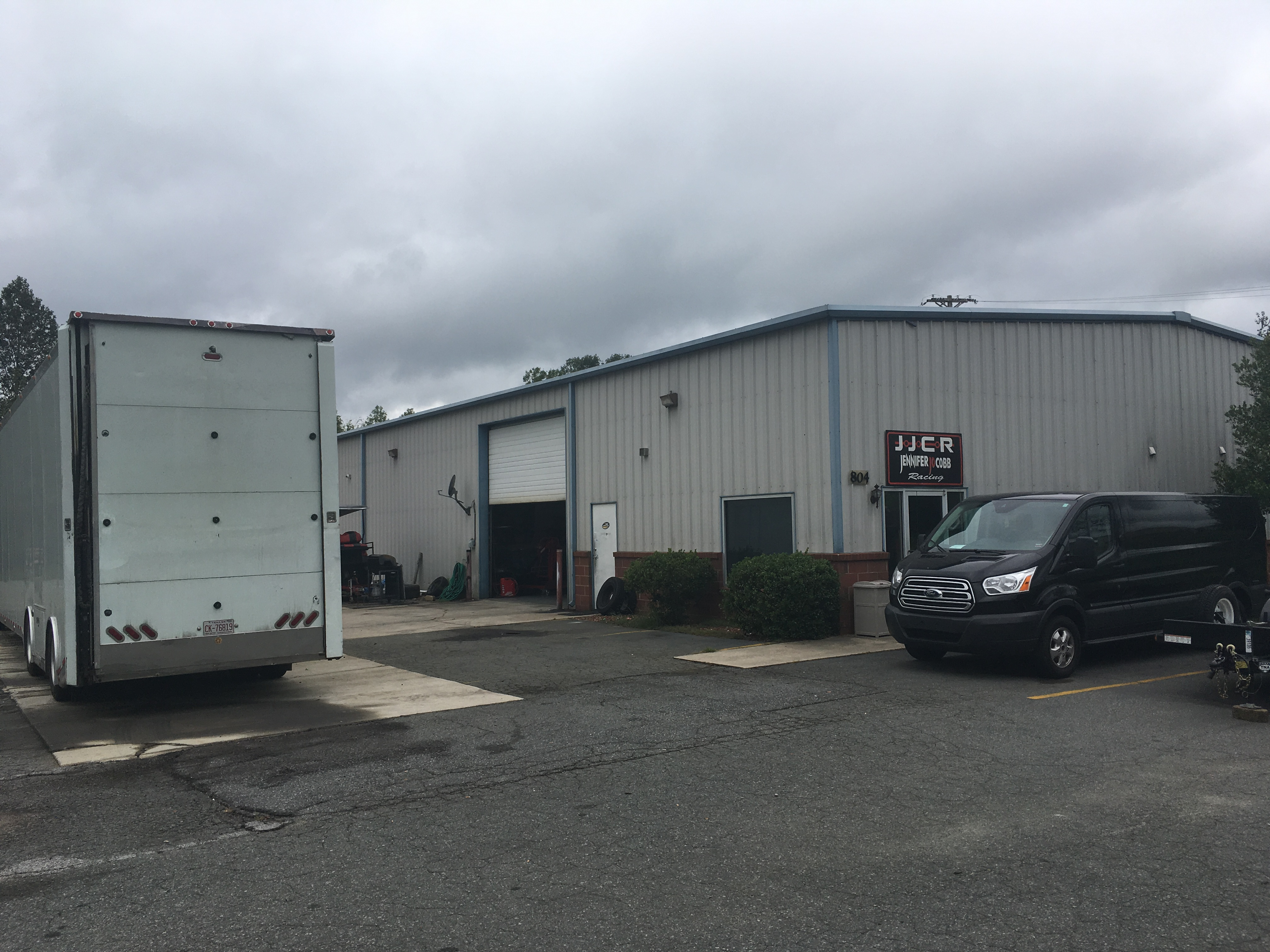
The Jennifer Jo Cobb Racing race shop in Mooresville, North Carolina.

In 2017, the No. 10 team ran most of the races, most of them being with Cobb. Ray Ciccarelli ran two races and Bryce Napier ran at Iowa. The team’s best finish was 18th twice, at Las Vegas and Pocono, with Cobb.

In 2018, Cobb ran the full schedule, only failing to qualify twice, at Eldora and Bristol. Her best finish was an 11th-place at Talladega.

In 2022, after failing to qualify for the NextEra Energy 250, Cobb announced the team would scale back to a part-time effort and only compete in races where a full-funded effort could be made. Cobb made her appearance at Talladega, where she finished 32nd after a clutch failure on lap 73.

Cobb and the team have not attempted any races since 2024, and the 10 number was taken by Kaulig Racing for their 2026 Ram Trucks program.

==== Truck No. 10 results ====
Year	Driver	No.	Make	1	2	3	4	5	6	7	8	9	10	11	12	13	14	15	16	17	18	19	20	21	22	23	24	25	Owners	Pts
2010	Jennifer Jo Cobb	10	Ford	DAY; 34	ATL; 21	MAR; 26	NSH; 25	KAN; 28	DOV; 22	CLT; 18	TEX; 14	MCH; 21	IOW; 25	GTY; 20	IRP; 26	POC; 27	NSH; 19	DAR; 14	BRI; 28	CHI; 22	KEN; 23	NHA; 22	LVS; 21	MAR; 33	TAL; 23	TEX; 24	PHO; 23	HOM; 24	23rd	2326
2011	Jennifer Jo Cobb	10	Ford	DAY; 6				NSH; DNQ			KAN; 27	TEX	KEN; 30	IOW	NSH; 23	IRP; 32	POC	MCH	BRI; DNQ	ATL; 23	CHI; 29	NHA; 35			TAL; DNQ	MAR; DNQ		HOM; 35	30th	225
2011	Jennifer Jo Cobb	10	Dodge																				KEN; 20	LVS; 18			TEX; 20		30th	225
2011	Chase Mattioli	10	Ford		PHO; 33	DAR; 34	MAR; 28																						30th	225
2011	Chris Lafferty	10	Chevy						DOV; 36	CLT																			30th	225
2012	Jennifer Jo Cobb	10	Ford	DAY; DNQ																									31st	238
2012	Jennifer Jo Cobb	10	Ram			CAR; DNQ	KAN; 25	CLT; 26	DOV; 26	TEX; 32		IOW; 29	CHI; 23	POC; 36	MCH; 22	BRI; DNQ	ATL; DNQ	IOW; 30	KEN; 16	LVS; 28	TAL; 27		TEX; 27	PHO; DNQ	HOM; 31				31st	238
2012	Jake Crum	10	Ram																			MAR; DNQ							31st	238
2012	Chris Lafferty	10	Ram								KEN; DNQ																		31st	238
2012	Chris Lafferty	10	Chevy		MAR; DNQ																								31st	238
2013	Jennifer Jo Cobb	10	Chevy	DAY; 35			KAN; 17		DOV; 27																				33rd	262
2013	Jennifer Jo Cobb	10	Ford											POC; 32	MCH; 25														33rd	262
2013	Jennifer Jo Cobb	10	Ram		MAR; 36	CAR; 31		CLT; DNQ		TEX; 27	KEN; 26	IOW; 32				BRI; DNQ	MSP; 23	IOW; 26	CHI; 28	LVS; 23	TAL; DNQ	MAR; DNQ	TEX; 29	PHO; 25	HOM; DNQ				33rd	262
2013	Joe Cobb	10	Ram										ELD; DNQ																33rd	262
2014	Jennifer Jo Cobb	10	Chevy	DAY; 21		KAN; 13	CLT; 16		TEX; 20		KEN; 24	IOW; 30		POC; 24	MCH; 20			CHI; 21	NHA; 22	LVS; 22	TAL; 18		TEX; 24	PHO; 23	HOM; 32				22nd	456
2014	Jennifer Jo Cobb	10	Ram		MAR; 27			DOV; 20		GTW; 27			ELD; DNQ			BRI; 27	MSP; 23					MAR; 28							22nd	456
2015	Jennifer Jo Cobb	10	Chevy	DAY; 18	ATL; 26	MAR; 24	KAN; 19	CLT; 19	DOV; 32	TEX; 19	GTW; 20	IOW; 21	KEN; 23	ELD; 27	POC; 26	MCH; 19	BRI; 25	MSP; 20	CHI; 23	NHA; 22	LVS; 21	TAL; 32	MAR; 31	TEX; 24	PHO; 22	HOM; 26			24th	473
2016	Jennifer Jo Cobb	10	Chevy	DAY; DNQ	ATL; 29		KAN; 24	DOV; 30	CLT; 28	TEX; DNQ			KEN; 24													HOM; DNQ			37th	48
2016	Claire Decker	10	Chevy			MAR; 27					IOW; 32																		37th	48
2016	Caleb Roark	10	Chevy									GTW; 31		ELD; DNQ	POC; 32		MCH; 30	MSP; 32	CHI; 32	NHA; 32	LVS; 31								37th	48
2016	Cody McMahan	10	Chevy													BRI; DNQ													37th	48
2016	Clay Greenfield	10	Chevy																			TAL; DNQ							37th	48
2016	Brad Foy	10	Chevy																				MAR; DNQ						37th	48
2016	Ryan Ellis	10	Chevy																					TEX; DNQ					37th	48
2016	Tommy Regan	10	Chevy																						PHO; DNQ				37th	48
2017	Jennifer Jo Cobb	10	Chevy	DAY; DNQ	ATL; DNQ		KAN; 27	CLT; 27	DOV; 30	TEX; 19	GTW; 30		KEN; 21		POC; 18	MCH; 22	BRI; 30	MSP; 27	CHI; 24	NHA; 24	LVS; 18	TAL; 19	MAR; 28	TEX; 22	PHO; 27				24th	315
2017	Chuck Buchanan Jr	10	Ford			MAR; DNQ																							24th	315
2017	Bryce Napier	10	Chevy									IOW; 25																	24th	315
2017	Ray Ciccarelli	10	Chevy											ELD; 22												HOM; 32			24th	315
2018	Jennifer Jo Cobb	10	Chevy	DAY; 31	ATL; 26	LVS; 24	MAR; 29	DOV; 22	KAN; 22	CLT; 26	TEX; 24	IOW; 22	GTW; 22	CHI; 24	KEN; 29	ELD; DNQ	POC; 22	MCH; 23	BRI; DNQ	MSP; 29	LVS; 12	TAL; 11	MAR; 29	TEX; 24	PHO; 31	HOM; 28			25th	271
2019	Jennifer Jo Cobb	10	Chevy	DAY; DNQ	ATL; 22	LVS; 27		TEX; 18	DOV; 25		CLT; DNQ	TEX; 18		GTW; 24	CHI; 21	KEN; 22	POC; 21	ELD; 19	MCH; 19	BRI; 22	MSP; 23	LVS; 24	TAL; 27	MAR; 27	PHO; DNQ	HOM; 28			25th	256
2019	Juan Manuel González	10	Chevy				MAR; DNQ						IOW; 30																25th	256
2019	Joey Gase	10	Chevy							KAN; 30																			25th	256
2020	Jennifer Jo Cobb	10	Chevy	DAY; DNQ	LVS; DNQ	CLT; 26	ATL; 36	HOM; 27	POC; 32	KEN; 37	TEX; 29	KAN; 31	KAN; 32	MCH; 28	DAY; 31	DOV; 29	GTW; 31	DAR; 30	RCH; 36	BRI; 28	LVS; 34	TAL; 24	KAN; 29	TEX; 24	MAR; 29	PHO; 31			37th	158
2021	Jennifer Jo Cobb	10	Chevy	DAY; 18	DAY; 35	LVS; 29	ATL; 38	BRD; 33	RCH; 38		DAR; 24	COA; DNQ					KNX; 25												40th	107
2021	Jennifer Jo Cobb	10	Ford							KAN; 37			CLT; 33	TEX; 31	NSH; Wth	POC; 31		GLN; 36	GTW; 38	DAR; 36	BRI; 27	LVS; 27	TAL; 31	MAR; 36	PHO; DNQ				40th	107
2022	Jennifer Jo Cobb	10	Chevy	DAY; DNQ	LVS	ATL	COA	MAR	BRD	DAR	KAN	TEX	CLT	GTW	SON; Wth	KNO								TAL; 32	HOM	PHO			50th	5
2022	Jennifer Jo Cobb	10	Ford														NSH; DNQ	MOH	POC	IRP	RCH	KAN	BRI						50th	5
2023	Jennifer Jo Cobb	10	Chevy	DAY	LVS	ATL	COA	TEX	BRD	MAR	KAN	DAR	NWS	CLT	GTW	NSH	MOH	POC	RCH	IRP	MLW	KAN; 34	BRI	TAL; DNQ	HOM	PHO			48th	3
2024	Jennifer Jo Cobb	10	Chevy	DAY; DNQ	ATL	LVS	BRI	COA	MAR	TEX	KAN; 32	DAR	NWS	CLT; DNQ	GTW	NSH	POC	IRP	RCH	MLW	BRI	KAN; 31	TAL	HOM	MAR	PHO			47th	11

== Xfinity Series ==
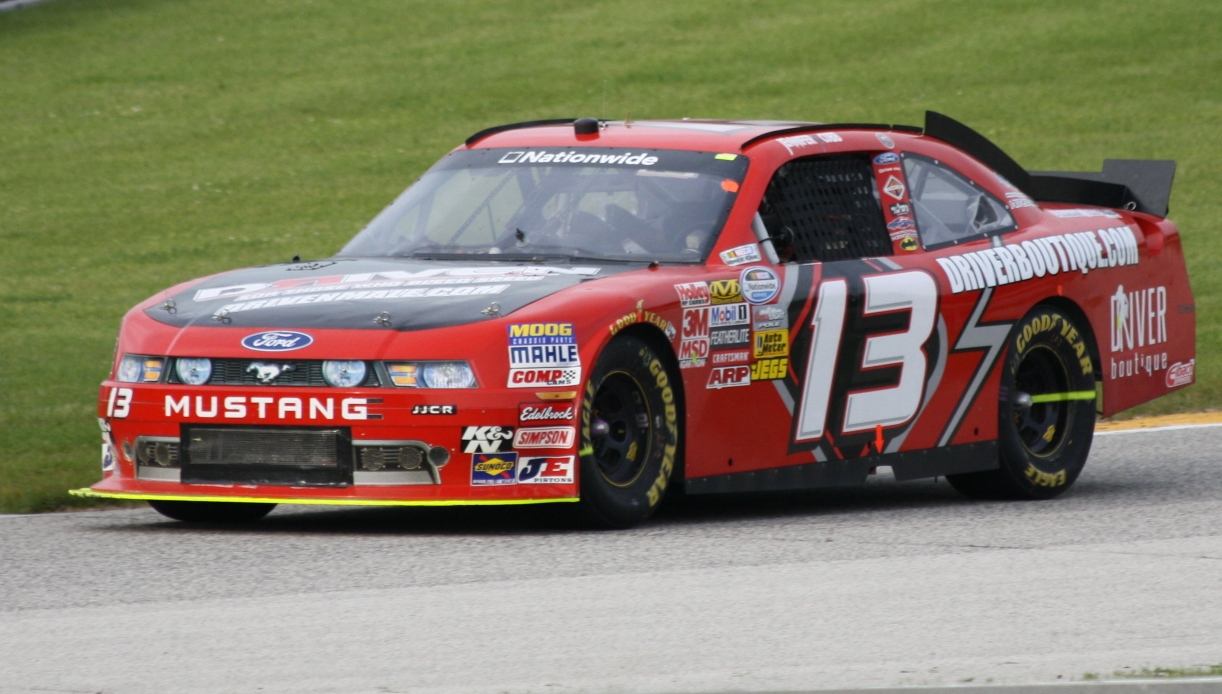
Cobb's No. 13 at Road America in 2011.

Cobb's team made their debut in what is now the Xfinity Series in 2010, fielding the No. 13 Ford at Cobb's home track of Kansas. She barely qualified for the race, starting last and finishing 34th in the race. Their first race in 2011 was at the Royal Purple 200 at Darlington, where Cobb finished 32nd after starting 42nd. The team would struggle much of the season and Cobb would turn over driving duties to more experienced drivers Rick Crawford at Chicagoland and D. J. Kennington at Montreal.

Cobb decided to focus on her Truck Series team in 2012, and she returned to that series to race full-time in it with her own team that year. Therefore, she would only make four Nationwide Series attempts in 2012. The team's best finish would come during that season during the Kansas Lottery 300 where Cobb would finish 22nd.

In 2015, JJCR fielded the No. 10 car in her hometown race at the Kansas Speedway. The No. 13 had been taken by MBM Motorsports when Cobb didn't field her Xfinity team in 2013 and 2014. However, the No. 10, Cobb's truck series number, which was previously used by TriStar Motorsports earlier in the year, was available, so she used that number. The No. 10 was the car number dropped by the TriStar team when they started using the No. 24 after Eric McClure moved from JGL Racing to TriStar mid-season, keeping his same car number when switching teams.

=== Car No. 10 results ===
NASCAR Xfinity Series results
Year	Driver	No.	Make	1	2	3	4	5	6	7	8	9	10	11	12	13	14	15	16	17	18	19	20	21	22	23	24	25	26	27	28	29	30	31	32	33	34	35	Owners	Pts
2010	Jennifer Jo Cobb	13	Ford	DAY	CAL	LVS	BRI	NSH	PHO	TEX	TAL	RCH	DAR	DOV	CLT	NSH	KEN	ROA	NHA	DAY	CHI; DNQ	GTY	IRP	IOW	GLN	MCH	BRI	CGV	ATL	RCH	DOV	KAN; 34	CAL	CLT	GTY	TEX	PHO	HOM	N/A	N/A
2011	Jennifer Jo Cobb	13	Ford	DAY	PHO	LVS	BRI	CAL	TEX	TAL	NSH	RCH	DAR; 32	DOV; 37	IOW; 26	CLT; 31		MCH; 32	ROA; 29	DAY; 36	KEN	NHA	NSH	IRP; 42															38th	163
2011	Jennifer Jo Cobb	13	Dodge																						IOW; 33			BRI; DNQ	ATL; 29	RCH; DNQ	CHI; DNQ	DOV	KAN; DNQ	CLT	TEX	PHO; DNQ	HOM; DNQ		38th	163
2011	Rick Crawford	13	Ford														CHI; 36																						38th	163
2011	T. J. Bell	13	Dodge																							GLN; 42													38th	163
2011	D. J. Kennington	13	Dodge																								CGV; 40												38th	163
2012	Jennifer Jo Cobb	13	Dodge	DAY	PHO; DNQ	LVS; 36	BRI	CAL	TEX	RCH	TAL	DAR	IOW	CLT	DOV	MCH	ROA	KEN	DAY	NHA	CHI	IND	IOW	GLN	CGV	BRI	ATL	RCH	CHI	KEN	DOV	CLT							58th	30
2012	Jennifer Jo Cobb	13	Chevy																														KAN; 22	TEX; DNQ	PHO	HOM			58th	30
2015	Jennifer Jo Cobb	10	Chevy	DAY	ATL	LVS	PHO	CAL	TEX	BRI	RCH	TAL	IOW	CLT	DOV	MCH	CHI	DAY	KEN	NHA	IND	IOW	GLN	MOH	BRI	ROA	DAR	RCH	CHI	KEN	DOV	CLT	KAN; 29	TEX	PHO	HOM			52nd	15
