= Caleb Roark =

American racing driver

- Born: January 13, 1993 (age 33); Abingdon, Virginia, U.S.

NASCAR O'Reilly Auto Parts Series career
- 1 race run over 1 year
- 2014 position: 115th
- Best finish: 115th (2014)
- First race: 2014 Get To Know Newton 250 (Iowa)
Wins	Top tens	Poles
0	0	0

NASCAR FedEx Freight Truck Series career
- 31 races run over 6 years
- 2016 position: 65th
- Best finish: 34th (2014)
- First race: 2011 Kroger 250 (Martinsville)
- Last race: 2016 DC Solar 350 (Las Vegas)
Wins	Top tens	Poles
0	0	0
- Statistics up to date as of October 1, 2016.

Caleb Roark (born January 13, 1993) is an American professional former stock car racing driver.

== Racing career ==
=== Early career ===
Roark was born in Abingdon, Virginia.

=== Nationwide Series ===
On May 16, 2014, Roark made his Nationwide Series debut at the Iowa Speedway. Roark partnered up with the now closed Viva Motorsports and earned himself a 32nd-place finish after dropping out of the race due to a vibration.

=== Camping World Truck Series ===
Roark made his NASCAR debut at the Martinsville Speedway in 2011 for SS-Green Light Racing in the No. 07 Chevrolet. After starting 32nd, Roark would gain 13 positions to finish 19th and earn his best career finish in any NASCAR start. After Roark's strong run at Martinsville, Roark made two more starts with the team in 2011 at the Iowa Speedway and Chicagoland Speedway to finish 24th and 22nd within the 36 trucks in the lineup. Roark only attempted two Truck Series races in the next two seasons for SS-Green Light Racing before leaving the team at the end of the 2013 season.

==== 2014 ====
After two seasons of minimal NASCAR participation, fellow Truck Series competitor Jennifer Jo Cobb had offered Roark a ride in the No. 0 Grimes Irrigation & Construction Chevrolet for a ten-race deal. His debut with Jennifer Jo Cobb Racing came at Gateway Motorsports Park where Roark started and finished in the 31st position after dropping out of the race from a vibration. Roark was unable to complete a race in 2014 while start and parking.

==== 2015 ====
Cobb kept Roark in the No. 0 for the 2015 season with new sponsorship from the Driven2Honor.org and shared the ride with Adam Edwards, who is also a part-time NASCAR Camping World Truck Series driver. Roark's season started out disappointing with three consecutive last place finishes, including failing to qualify at the Dover International Speedway and being swapped out at Gateway by Edwards. While start and parking, Roark had a best finish of 28th at the Michigan International Speedway. He continued to complete more laps in 2015 as the season came to a close, giving him a total of $85,026 by the end of the year, nearly $2,000 more than 2014.

==== 2016 ====
It was announced at the start of the 2016 season that Jennifer Jo Cobb would not be running the No. 0 for future races, leaving Roark without a ride. He would remain a free agent until Cobb sold the No. 10 truck to Roark in which he would continue his start and park efforts with Jennifer Jo Cobb Racing.

On September 24, during the first lap of the UNOH 175 from the New Hampshire Motor Speedway, Roark was attempting to pull onto pit road to park his truck when he spun into the sand barrels that protects the butt-end of the wall, damaging the truck. Roark also competed in seven more races throughout the season, with his last being at Las Vegas.

== Motorsports career results ==
=== NASCAR ===
(key) (Bold – Pole position awarded by qualifying time. Italics – Pole position earned by points standings or practice time. * – Most laps led.)

==== Nationwide Series ====
NASCAR Nationwide Series results
Year	Team	No.	Make	1	2	3	4	5	6	7	8	9	10	11	12	13	14	15	16	17	18	19	20	21	22	23	24	25	26	27	28	29	30	31	32	33	NNSC	Pts	Ref
2014	SS-Green Light Racing	55	Chevy	DAY	PHO	LVS	BRI	CAL	TXS	DAR	RCH	TAL	IOW; 32	CLT	DOV	MCH	ROA	KEN	DAY	NHA	CHI	IND	IOW	GLN	MOH	BRI	ATL	RCH	CHI	KEN	DOV	KAN	CLT	TEX	PHO	HOM	115th	0	

==== Camping World Truck Series ====
NASCAR Camping World Truck Series results
Year	Team	No.	Make	1	2	3	4	5	6	7	8	9	10	11	12	13	14	15	16	17	18	19	20	21	22	23	24	25	NCWTC	Pts	Ref
2011	SS-Green Light Racing	07	Chevy	DAY	PHO	DAR	MAR; 19	NSH	DOV	CLT	KAN	TEX	KEN	IOW; 24	NSH	IRP	POC	MCH	BRI	ATL	CHI; 22	NHA	KEN	LVS	TAL	MAR	TEX	HOM	47th	67	
2012	MB Motorsports	63	Ford	DAY; DNQ	MAR	CAR	KAN	CLT	DOV	TEX	KEN	IOW	CHI	POC	MCH	BRI	ATL												74th	12	
2012	SS-Green Light Racing	07	Chevy															IOW; 32	KEN	LVS	TAL	MAR	TEX	PHO	HOM				74th	12	
2013	SS-Green Light Racing	07	Toyota	DAY	MAR	CAR	KAN	CLT	DOV	TEX	KEN	IOW	ELD	POC	MCH	BRI	MSP	IOW	CHI	LVS; 28	TAL	MAR	TEX	PHO	HOM				65th	16	
2014	JJC Racing	0	Chevy	DAY	MAR	KAN	CLT	DOV	TEX	GTW; 31	KEN			POC; 31	MCH; 29	BRI		CHI; 28	NHA; 28	LVS; 29	TAL	MAR	TEX; 30	PHO	HOM; 36				34th	135	
2014	JJC Racing	0	Ram									IOW; 35	ELD				MSP; 28												34th	135	
2015	JJC Racing	0	Chevy	DAY	ATL	MAR	KAN; 32	CLT	DOV	TEX	GTW	IOW; 32	KEN	ELD	POC; 32	MCH; 28	BRI; DNQ	MSP	CHI; 31	NHA; 31	LVS; 30	TAL	MAR	TEX; 32	PHO; DNQ	HOM			41st	104	
2016	JJC Racing	10	Chevy	DAY	ATL	MAR	KAN	DOV	CLT	TEX	IOW	GTW; 31		ELD; DNQ	POC; 32	BRI	MCH; 30	MSP; 32	CHI; 32	NHA; 32	LVS; 31	TAL	MAR	TEX	PHO	HOM			65th	12	
2016	JJC Racing	1	Chevy										KEN; 32																65th	12	

^{*} Season still in progress
^{1} Ineligible for series points
