= 2015 American Ethanol 200 =

9th race of the 2015 NASCAR Camping World Truck Series

2015 American Ethanol 200 presented by Enogen
Race details
- Race 9 of 23 of the 2015 NASCAR Camping World Truck Series
- Date: June 19, 2015
- Official name: 7th Annual American Ethanol 200 presented by Enogen
- Location: Iowa Speedway, Newton, Iowa
- Course: Permanent racing facility
- Course length: 0.875 miles (1.408 km)
- Distance: 200 laps, 175 mi (281 km)
- Scheduled distance: 200 laps, 175 mi (281 km)
- Average speed: 96.730 mph (155.672 km/h)

Pole position
Driver	Erik Jones	Kyle Busch Motorsports
- Time: 23.129

Most laps led
Driver	Erik Jones	Kyle Busch Motorsports
- Laps: 112

Winner
No. 4	Erik Jones	Kyle Busch Motorsports

Television in the United States
- Network: FS1
- Announcers: Brian Till, Phil Parsons, and Todd Bodine

Radio in the United States
- Radio: MRN

The 2015 American Ethanol 200 presented by Enogen was the 9th stock car race of the 2015 NASCAR Camping World Truck Series, and the 7th iteration of the event. The race was held on Friday, June 19, 2015, in Newton, Iowa at Iowa Speedway, a 0.875 mile (1.408 km) permanent tri-oval shaped racetrack. The race took the scheduled 200 laps to complete. Erik Jones, driving for Kyle Busch Motorsports, would put on a dominating performance, winning the pole and leading a race-high 112 laps, earning his fifth career NASCAR Camping World Truck Series win, and his first of the season. To fill out the podium, Brandon Jones, driving for GMS Racing, and Tyler Reddick, driving for Brad Keselowski Racing, would finish 2nd and 3rd, respectively.

== Background ==
Iowa Speedway is a 7/8-mile (1.4 km) paved oval motor racing track in Newton, Iowa, United States, approximately 30 mi (48 km) east of Des Moines. It has over 25,000 permanent seats as well as a unique multi-tiered RV viewing area along the backstretch. The premiere event of the track is the Hy-Vee IndyCar Race Weekend held yearly in July since its inaugural running in 2007.

=== Entry list ===
- (R) denotes rookie driver.
- (i) denotes driver who is ineligible for series driver points.

#	Driver	Team	Make	Sponsor
00	Cole Custer	JR Motorsports	Chevrolet	Haas Automation
0	Caleb Roark	Jennifer Jo Cobb Racing	Chevrolet	Driven2Honor.org
1	Ryan Ellis	MAKE Motorsports	Chevrolet	Altec Lansing, Shane Duncan Band
02	Tyler Young	Young's Motorsports	Chevrolet	Randco, Young's Building Systems
03	Mike Affarano (i)	Mike Affarano Motorsports	Chevrolet	Mike Affarano Motorsports
4	Erik Jones (R)	Kyle Busch Motorsports	Toyota	Special Olympics World Games
05	John Wes Townley	Athenian Motorsports	Chevrolet	Zaxby's
6	Norm Benning	Norm Benning Racing	Chevrolet	Boedeker Construction
07	Ray Black Jr. (R)	SS-Green Light Racing	Chevrolet	ScubaLife
08	Korbin Forrister (R)	BJMM with SS-Green Light Racing	Chevrolet	Tilted Kilt
8	John Hunter Nemechek (R)	SWM-NEMCO Motorsports	Chevrolet	MeetBall
10	Jennifer Jo Cobb	Jennifer Jo Cobb Racing	Chevrolet	POW, MIAFamilies.org
11	Ben Kennedy	Red Horse Racing	Toyota	Local Motors
13	Cameron Hayley (R)	ThorSport Racing	Toyota	Cabinets by Hayley
14	Daniel Hemric (R)	NTS Motorsports	Chevrolet	California Clean Power
15	Mason Mingus	Billy Boat Motorsports	Chevrolet	Call 811 Before You Dig
17	Timothy Peters	Red Horse Racing	Toyota	Red Horse Racing
19	Tyler Reddick	Brad Keselowski Racing	Ford	BBR Music Group
23	Spencer Gallagher (R)	GMS Racing	Chevrolet	Allegiant Travel Company
29	Austin Theriault (R)	Brad Keselowski Racing	Ford	Cooper-Standard Automotive
33	Brandon Jones (R)	GMS Racing	Chevrolet	AGRA Industries
36	Justin Jennings	MB Motorsports	Chevrolet	LG Seeds, Mittler Bros.
45	Tommy Regan	B. J. McLeod Motorsports	Chevrolet	Trijicon, Cope's Distribution
50	Travis Kvapil	MAKE Motorsports	Chevrolet	Burnie Grill
51	Christopher Bell	Kyle Busch Motorsports	Toyota	Toyota Certified Used Vehicles
54	Justin Boston (R)	Kyle Busch Motorsports	Toyota	ROK Mobile
63	Jake Griffin	MB Motorsports	Chevrolet	Vatterott College, Mittler Bros.
74	Jordan Anderson	Mike Harmon Racing	Chevrolet	Mike Harmon Racing
75	Caleb Holman	Henderson Motorsports	Chevrolet	Food Country USA
88	Matt Crafton	ThorSport Racing	Toyota	Chi-Chi's, Menards
94	Timmy Hill	Premium Motorsports	Chevrolet	Premium Motorsports
98	Johnny Sauter	ThorSport Racing	Toyota	Nextant Aerospace, Curb Records
Official entry list

== Practice ==
The first and only practice session was held on Saturday, June 13, at 10:00 AM CST, and would last for 2 hours and 25 minutes. Erik Jones, driving for Kyle Busch Motorsports, would set the fastest time in the session, with a lap of 23.153, and an average speed of 136.051 mph (218.953 km/h).

Pos.	#	Driver	Team	Make	Time	Speed
1	4	Erik Jones (R)	Kyle Busch Motorsports	Toyota	23.153	136.051
2	51	Christopher Bell	Kyle Busch Motorsports	Toyota	23.216	135.682
3	8	John Hunter Nemechek (R)	SWM-NEMCO Motorsports	Chevrolet	23.300	135.193
Full practice results

== Qualifying ==
Qualifying was held on Friday, June 19, at 4:45 PM CST. The qualifying system used is a multi car, multi lap, three round system where in the first round, everyone would set a time to determine positions 25–32. Then, the fastest 24 qualifiers would move on to the second round to determine positions 13–24. Lastly, the fastest 12 qualifiers would move on to the third round to determine positions 1–12.

Erik Jones, driving for Kyle Busch Motorsports, would win the pole after advancing from the preliminary rounds and setting the fastest time in Round 3, with a lap of 23.129, and an average speed of 136.193 mph (219.181 km/h).

No driver would fail to qualify.

=== Full qualifying results ===
Pos.	#	Driver	Team	Make	Time (R1)	Speed (R1)	Time (R2)	Speed (R2)	Time (R3)	Speed (R3)
1	4	Erik Jones (R)	Kyle Busch Motorsports	Toyota	22.836	137.940	22.986	137.040	23.129	136.193
2	8	John Hunter Nemechek (R)	SWM-NEMCO Motorsports	Chevrolet	23.258	135.437	23.223	135.641	23.172	135.940
3	19	Tyler Reddick	Brad Keselowski Racing	Ford	23.522	133.917	23.225	135.630	23.303	135.176
4	33	Brandon Jones (R)	GMS Racing	Chevrolet	23.416	134.523	23.205	135.747	23.347	134.921
5	13	Cameron Hayley (R)	ThorSport Racing	Toyota	23.687	132.984	23.325	135.048	23.366	134.811
6	75	Caleb Holman	Henderson Motorsports	Chevrolet	23.328	135.031	23.170	135.952	23.396	134.638
7	00	Cole Custer	JR Motorsports	Chevrolet	23.447	134.346	23.359	134.852	23.417	134.518
8	11	Ben Kennedy	Red Horse Racing	Toyota	23.504	134.020	23.371	134.782	23.422	134.489
9	88	Matt Crafton	ThorSport Racing	Toyota	23.346	134.927	23.354	134.881	23.451	134.323
10	51	Christopher Bell	Kyle Busch Motorsports	Toyota	23.158	136.022	23.291	135.245	23.520	133.929
11	54	Justin Boston (R)	Kyle Busch Motorsports	Toyota	23.419	134.506	23.386	134.696	23.522	133.917
12	05	John Wes Townley	Athenian Motorsports	Chevrolet	23.246	135.507	23.322	134.066	23.595	133.503
Eliminated from Round 2
13	14	Daniel Hemric (R)	NTS Motorsports	Chevrolet	23.517	133.946	23.403	134.598	–	–
14	23	Spencer Gallagher (R)	GMS Racing	Chevrolet	23.549	133.764	23.420	134.500	–	–
15	63	Jake Griffin	MB Motorsports	Chevrolet	23.628	133.316	23.464	134.248	–	–
16	17	Timothy Peters	Red Horse Racing	Toyota	23.601	133.469	23.491	134.094	–	–
17	15	Mason Mingus	Billy Boat Motorsports	Chevrolet	23.754	132.609	23.507	134.003	–	–
18	29	Austin Theriault (R)	Brad Keselowski Racing	Ford	23.789	132.414	23.548	133.769	–	–
19	02	Tyler Young	Young's Motorsports	Chevrolet	23.747	132.648	23.659	133.142	–	–
20	98	Johnny Sauter	ThorSport Racing	Toyota	23.395	134.644	23.682	133.012	–	–
21	50	Travis Kvapil	MAKE Motorsports	Chevrolet	23.861	132.015	23.929	131.639	–	–
22	94	Timmy Hill	Premium Motorsports	Chevrolet	23.858	132.031	23.956	131.491	–	–
23	07	Ray Black Jr. (R)	SS-Green Light Racing	Chevrolet	23.982	131.349	23.957	131.486	–	–
24	36	Justin Jennings	MB Motorsports	Chevrolet	24.145	130.462	–	–	–	–
Eliminated from Round 1
25	08	Korbin Forrister (R)	BJMM with SS-Green Light Racing	Chevrolet	24.388	129.162	–	–	–	–
26	74	Jordan Anderson	Mike Harmon Racing	Chevrolet	24.408	129.056	–	–	–	–
27	10	Jennifer Jo Cobb	Jennifer Jo Cobb Racing	Chevrolet	24.443	128.871	–	–	–	–
Qualified by owner's points
28	1	Ryan Ellis	MAKE Motorsports	Chevrolet	25.131	125.343	–	–	–	–
29	6	Norm Benning	Norm Benning Racing	Chevrolet	25.399	124.021	–	–	–	–
30	45	Tommy Regan	B. J. McLeod Motorsports	Chevrolet	25.686	122.635	–	–	–	–
31	03	Mike Affarano (i)	Mike Affarano Motorsports	Chevrolet	26.130	120.551	–	–	–	–
Qualified by time
32	0	Caleb Roark	Jennifer Jo Cobb Racing	Chevrolet	26.128	120.560	–	–	–	–
Official qualifying results
Official starting lineup

== Race results ==
Fin	St	#	Driver	Team	Make	Laps	Led	Status	Pts	Winnings
1	1	4	Erik Jones (R)	Kyle Busch Motorsports	Toyota	200	112	Running	48	$48,421
2	4	33	Brandon Jones (R)	GMS Racing	Chevrolet	200	4	Running	43	$29,147
3	3	19	Tyler Reddick	Brad Keselowski Racing	Ford	200	0	Running	41	$27,459
4	9	88	Matt Crafton	ThorSport Racing	Toyota	200	33	Running	41	$21,600
5	10	51	Christopher Bell	Kyle Busch Motorsports	Toyota	200	0	Running	39	$18,646
6	16	17	Timothy Peters	Red Horse Racing	Toyota	200	0	Running	38	$16,562
7	14	23	Spencer Gallagher (R)	GMS Racing	Chevrolet	200	0	Running	37	$16,006
8	13	14	Daniel Hemric (R)	NTS Motorsports	Chevrolet	200	0	Running	36	$15,757
9	7	00	Cole Custer	JR Motorsports	Chevrolet	200	0	Running	35	$15,701
10	12	05	John Wes Townley	Athenian Motorsports	Chevrolet	200	0	Running	34	$16,596
11	11	54	Justin Boston (R)	Kyle Busch Motorsports	Toyota	200	0	Running	33	$15,591
12	18	29	Austin Theriault (R)	Brad Keselowski Racing	Ford	200	0	Running	32	$15,451
13	8	11	Ben Kennedy	Red Horse Racing	Toyota	200	0	Running	31	$15,396
14	6	75	Caleb Holman	Henderson Motorsports	Chevrolet	200	0	Running	30	$13,090
15	23	07	Ray Black Jr. (R)	SS-Green Light Racing	Chevrolet	199	0	Running	29	$15,801
16	17	15	Mason Mingus	Billy Boat Motorsports	Chevrolet	199	0	Running	28	$15,062
17	20	98	Johnny Sauter	ThorSport Racing	Toyota	198	14	Running	28	$14,952
18	22	94	Timmy Hill	Premium Motorsports	Chevrolet	198	0	Running	26	$14,813
19	5	13	Cameron Hayley (R)	ThorSport Racing	Toyota	198	37	Running	26	$14,702
20	19	02	Tyler Young	Young's Motorsports	Chevrolet	197	0	Running	24	$13,897
21	27	10	Jennifer Jo Cobb	Jennifer Jo Cobb Racing	Chevrolet	196	0	Running	23	$13,230
22	26	74	Jordan Anderson	Mike Harmon Racing	Chevrolet	193	0	Running	22	$12,119
23	2	8	John Hunter Nemechek (R)	SWM-NEMCO Motorsports	Chevrolet	157	0	Accident	21	$11,980
24	21	50	Travis Kvapil	MAKE Motorsports	Chevrolet	148	0	Drive Shaft	20	$11,897
25	29	6	Norm Benning	Norm Benning Racing	Chevrolet	93	0	Oil Leak	19	$12,019
26	25	08	Korbin Forrister (R)	BJMM with SS-Green Light Racing	Chevrolet	65	0	Engine	18	$11,841
27	15	63	Jake Griffin	MB Motorsports	Chevrolet	41	0	Accident	17	$11,786
28	30	45	Tommy Regan	B. J. McLeod Motorsports	Chevrolet	33	0	Electrical	16	$11,539
29	28	1	Ryan Ellis	MAKE Motorsports	Chevrolet	24	0	Suspension	15	$11,511
30	31	03	Mike Affarano (i)	Mike Affarano Motorsports	Chevrolet	22	0	Vibration	0	$11,011
31	24	36	Justin Jennings	MB Motorsports	Chevrolet	15	0	Electrical	13	$9,511
32	32	0	Caleb Roark	Jennifer Jo Cobb Racing	Chevrolet	5	0	Vibration	12	$8,511
Official race results

== Standings after the race ==
Drivers' Championship standings

	Pos	Driver	Points
	1	Matt Crafton	370
	2	Tyler Reddick	358 (-12)
1	3	Erik Jones	344 (–26)
1	4	Johnny Sauter	327 (–43)
	5	John Wes Townley	294 (–76)
1	6	Spencer Gallagher	288 (–82)
2	7	Timothy Peters	283 (–87)
	8	Daniel Hemric	282 (–88)
3	9	Cameron Hayley	280 (–90)
	10	Ben Kennedy	269 (–101)
Official driver's standings

- Note: Only the first 10 positions are included for the driver standings.

Previous race: 2015 Drivin' for Linemen 200	NASCAR Camping World Truck Series; 2015 season	Next race: 2015 UNOH 225
