= 2015 Drivin' for Linemen 200 =

8th race of the 2015 NASCAR Camping World Truck Series

Race details
- Race 8 of 23 of the 2015 NASCAR Camping World Truck Series
- Date: June 13, 2015
- Official name: 2nd Annual Drivin' for Linemen
- Location: Gateway Motorsports Park, Madison, Illinois
- Course: Permanent racing facility
- Course length: 1.25 miles (2.01 km)
- Distance: 160 laps, 200 mi (321 km)
- Scheduled distance: 160 laps, 200 mi (321 km)
- Average speed: 96.970 mph (156.058 km/h)

Pole position
Driver	Erik Jones	Kyle Busch Motorsports
- Grid positions set by competition-based formula

Most laps led
Driver	Erik Jones	Kyle Busch Motorsports
- Laps: 84

Winner
No. 00	Cole Custer	JR Motorsports

Television in the United States
- Network: FS1
- Announcers: Ralph Sheheen, Phil Parsons, and Todd Bodine

Radio in the United States
- Radio: MRN

The 2015 Drivin' for Linemen 200 was the 8th stock car race of the 2015 NASCAR Camping World Truck Series, and the 2nd iteration of the event. The race was held on Saturday, June 13, 2015, in Madison, Illinois at Gateway Motorsports Park, a 1.25 mile (2.01 km) permanent tri-oval shaped racetrack. The race took the scheduled 160 laps to complete. Cole Custer, driving for JR Motorsports, would hold off the field on the final restart with five laps to go, earning his second career NASCAR Camping World Truck Series win, and his first of the season. Matt Crafton and pole-sitter Erik Jones had dominated the majority of the race, leading 49 and 84 laps, before being involved in late-race incidents. To fill out the podium, Spencer Gallagher, driving for GMS Racing, and Johnny Sauter, driving for ThorSport Racing, would finish 2nd and 3rd, respectively.

== Background ==
Gateway Motorsports Park (formerly Gateway International Raceway) is a motorsport racing facility in Madison, Illinois, just east of St. Louis, Missouri, United States, close to the Gateway Arch. It features a 1.250 mi (2.012 km) oval that hosts the NASCAR Cup Series, NASCAR Craftsman Truck Series, and the NTT IndyCar Series, a 2.000-mile (3.219 km) infield road course used by SpeedTour TransAm, SCCA, and Porsche Club of America, a quarter-mile NHRA-sanctioned drag strip that hosts the annual NHRA Camping World Drag Racing Series Midwest Nationals event, and the Kartplex, a state-of-the-art karting facility.

=== Entry list ===
- (R) denotes rookie driver.
- (i) denotes driver who is ineligible for series driver points.

#	Driver	Team	Make	Sponsor
00	Cole Custer	JR Motorsports	Chevrolet	Haas Automation
0	Adam Edwards	Jennifer Jo Cobb Racing	Chevrolet	Driven2Honor.org
1	Ryan Ellis	MAKE Motorsports	Chevrolet	Altec Lansing
02	Tyler Young	Young's Motorsports	Chevrolet	Randco, Young's Building Systems
03	Mike Affarano (i)	Mike Affarano Motorsports	Chevrolet	Mike Affarano Motorsports
4	Erik Jones (R)	Kyle Busch Motorsports	Toyota	Special Olympics World Games
05	John Wes Townley	Athenian Motorsports	Chevrolet	Zaxby's
6	Norm Benning	Norm Benning Racing	Chevrolet	Boedeker Construction
07	Ray Black Jr. (R)	SS-Green Light Racing	Chevrolet	ScubaLife
08	Korbin Forrister (R)	BJMM with SS-Green Light Racing	Chevrolet	Tilted Kilt
8	John Hunter Nemechek (R)	SWM-NEMCO Motorsports	Chevrolet	SWM-NEMCO Motorsports
10	Jennifer Jo Cobb	Jennifer Jo Cobb Racing	Chevrolet	POW, MIAFamilies.org
11	Ben Kennedy	Red Horse Racing	Toyota	Local Motors
13	Cameron Hayley (R)	ThorSport Racing	Toyota	Cabinets by Hayley
14	Daniel Hemric (R)	NTS Motorsports	Chevrolet	California Clean Power
15	Mason Mingus	Billy Boat Motorsports	Chevrolet	Call 811 Before You Dig
17	Timothy Peters	Red Horse Racing	Toyota	Red Horse Racing
19	Tyler Reddick	Brad Keselowski Racing	Ford	BBR Music Group
23	Spencer Gallagher (R)	GMS Racing	Chevrolet	Allegiant Travel Company
29	Austin Theriault (R)	Brad Keselowski Racing	Ford	Cooper-Standard Automotive
33	Brandon Jones (R)	GMS Racing	Chevrolet	Masterforce Tool Storage
36	Justin Jennings	MB Motorsports	Chevrolet	Mittler Bros., Ski Soda
45	Tommy Regan	B. J. McLeod Motorsports	Chevrolet	Trijicon, Cope's Distribution
50	Travis Kvapil	MAKE Motorsports	Chevrolet	Burnie Grill
51	Matt Tifft	Kyle Busch Motorsports	Toyota	ToyotaCare
54	Justin Boston (R)	Kyle Busch Motorsports	Toyota	ROK Mobile
57	Joey Gattina	Norm Benning Racing	Chevrolet	Truckworx
63	Tyler Tanner	MB Motorsports	Chevrolet	Vatterott College, Mittler Bros.
74	Jordan Anderson	Mike Harmon Racing	Chevrolet	Mike Harmon Racing
88	Matt Crafton	ThorSport Racing	Toyota	Ideal Door, Menards
94	Timmy Hill	Premium Motorsports	Chevrolet	Premium Motorsports
98	Johnny Sauter	ThorSport Racing	Toyota	Nextant Aerospace, Curb Records
Official entry list

== Practice ==
The first and only practice session was held on Saturday, June 13, at 9:30 AM CST, and would last for 2 hours and 30 minutes. Erik Jones, driving for Kyle Busch Motorsports, would set the fastest time in the session, with a lap of 32.903, and an average speed of 136.766 mph (220.104 km/h).

Pos.	#	Driver	Team	Make	Time	Speed
1	4	Erik Jones (R)	Kyle Busch Motorsports	Toyota	32.903	136.766
2	00	Cole Custer	JR Motorsports	Chevrolet	32.945	136.591
3	88	Matt Crafton	ThorSport Racing	Toyota	32.948	136.579
Full practice results

== Starting lineup ==
Qualifying was originally going to be held on Saturday, June 13, at 4:45 PM CST, but was cancelled due to rain showers. The starting lineup was determined by practice speeds. As a result, Erik Jones, driving for Kyle Busch Motorsports, would earn the pole.

No driver would fail to qualify

=== Full qualifying results ===
Pos.	#	Driver	Team	Make
1	4	Erik Jones (R)	Kyle Busch Motorsports	Toyota
2	00	Cole Custer	JR Motorsports	Chevrolet
3	88	Matt Crafton	ThorSport Racing	Toyota
4	98	Johnny Sauter	ThorSport Racing	Toyota
5	33	Brandon Jones (R)	GMS Racing	Chevrolet
6	19	Tyler Reddick	Brad Keselowski Racing	Ford
7	14	Daniel Hemric (R)	NTS Motorsports	Chevrolet
8	51	Matt Tifft	Kyle Busch Motorsports	Toyota
9	13	Cameron Hayley (R)	ThorSport Racing	Toyota
10	29	Austin Theriault (R)	Brad Keselowski Racing	Ford
11	05	John Wes Townley	Athenian Motorsports	Chevrolet
12	8	John Hunter Nemechek (R)	SWM-NEMCO Motorsports	Chevrolet
13	17	Timothy Peters	Red Horse Racing	Toyota
14	23	Spencer Gallagher (R)	GMS Racing	Chevrolet
15	11	Ben Kennedy	Red Horse Racing	Toyota
16	15	Mason Mingus	Billy Boat Motorsports	Chevrolet
17	02	Tyler Young	Young's Motorsports	Chevrolet
18	07	Ray Black Jr. (R)	SS-Green Light Racing	Chevrolet
19	54	Justin Boston (R)	Kyle Busch Motorsports	Toyota
20	50	Travis Kvapil	MAKE Motorsports	Chevrolet
21	63	Tyler Tanner	MB Motorsports	Chevrolet
22	36	Justin Jennings	MB Motorsports	Chevrolet
23	94	Timmy Hill	Premium Motorsports	Chevrolet
24	08	Korbin Forrister (R)	BJMM with SS-Green Light Racing	Chevrolet
25	10	Jennifer Jo Cobb	Jennifer Jo Cobb Racing	Chevrolet
26	45	Tommy Regan	B. J. McLeod Motorsports	Chevrolet
27	74	Jordan Anderson	Mike Harmon Racing	Chevrolet
28	1	Ryan Ellis	MAKE Motorsports	Chevrolet
29	6	Norm Benning	Norm Benning Racing	Chevrolet
30	0	Adam Edwards	Jennifer Jo Cobb Racing	Chevrolet
31	03	Mike Affarano (i)	Mike Affarano Motorsports	Chevrolet
32	57	Joey Gattina	Norm Benning Racing	Chevrolet
Official starting lineup

== Race results ==
Fin	St	#	Driver	Team	Make	Laps	Led	Status	Pts	Winnings
1	2	00	Cole Custer	JR Motorsports	Chevrolet	160	19	Running	47	$45,121
2	14	23	Spencer Gallagher (R)	GMS Racing	Chevrolet	160	0	Running	42	$30,147
3	4	98	Johnny Sauter	ThorSport Racing	Toyota	160	4	Running	42	$23,559
4	12	8	John Hunter Nemechek (R)	SWM-NEMCO Motorsports	Chevrolet	160	0	Running	40	$21,400
5	9	13	Cameron Hayley (R)	ThorSport Racing	Toyota	160	0	Running	39	$18,346
6	13	17	Timothy Peters	Red Horse Racing	Toyota	160	0	Running	38	$17,162
7	15	11	Ben Kennedy	Red Horse Racing	Toyota	160	0	Running	37	$16,306
8	6	19	Tyler Reddick	Brad Keselowski Racing	Ford	160	4	Running	37	$15,757
9	7	14	Daniel Hemric (R)	NTS Motorsports	Chevrolet	160	0	Running	35	$15,701
10	10	29	Austin Theriault (R)	Brad Keselowski Racing	Ford	160	0	Running	34	$16,596
11	11	05	John Wes Townley	Athenian Motorsports	Chevrolet	160	0	Running	33	$15,591
12	5	33	Brandon Jones (R)	GMS Racing	Chevrolet	160	0	Running	32	$15,451
13	18	07	Ray Black Jr. (R)	SS-Green Light Racing	Chevrolet	160	0	Running	31	$15,396
14	20	50	Travis Kvapil	MAKE Motorsports	Chevrolet	160	0	Running	30	$15,340
15	17	02	Tyler Young	Young's Motorsports	Chevrolet	160	0	Running	29	$15,601
16	21	63	Tyler Tanner	MB Motorsports	Chevrolet	159	0	Running	28	$15,262
17	28	1	Ryan Ellis	MAKE Motorsports	Chevrolet	157	0	Running	27	$14,952
18	23	94	Timmy Hill	Premium Motorsports	Chevrolet	157	0	Running	26	$14,813
19	27	74	Jordan Anderson	Mike Harmon Racing	Chevrolet	156	0	Running	25	$13,452
20	25	10	Jennifer Jo Cobb	Jennifer Jo Cobb Racing	Chevrolet	156	0	Running	24	$13,897
21	3	88	Matt Crafton	ThorSport Racing	Toyota	151	49	Accident	24	$13,230
22	24	08	Korbin Forrister (R)	BJMM with SS-Green Light Racing	Chevrolet	148	0	Running	22	$12,119
23	1	4	Erik Jones (R)	Kyle Busch Motorsports	Toyota	145	84	Electrical	23	$11,980
24	26	45	Tommy Regan	B. J. McLeod Motorsports	Chevrolet	108	0	Electrical	20	$11,897
25	8	51	Matt Tifft	Kyle Busch Motorsports	Toyota	92	0	Accident	19	$12,019
26	29	6	Norm Benning	Norm Benning Racing	Chevrolet	56	0	Brakes	18	$11,841
27	19	54	Justin Boston (R)	Kyle Busch Motorsports	Toyota	51	0	Accident	17	$11,786
28	16	15	Mason Mingus	Billy Boat Motorsports	Chevrolet	51	0	Accident	16	$11,539
29	22	36	Justin Jennings	MB Motorsports	Chevrolet	26	0	Brakes	15	$11,511
30	31	03	Mike Affarano (i)	Mike Affarano Motorsports	Chevrolet	13	0	Brakes	0	$11,011
31	30	0	Adam Edwards	Jennifer Jo Cobb Racing	Chevrolet	6	0	Brakes	13	$9,511
32	32	57	Joey Gattina	Norm Benning Racing	Chevrolet	0	0	Engine	12	$8,511
Official race results

== Standings after the race ==
Drivers' Championship standings

	Pos	Driver	Points
	1	Matt Crafton	329
	2	Tyler Reddick	317 (-12)
1	3	Johnny Sauter	299 (–30)
1	4	Erik Jones	296 (–33)
	5	John Wes Townley	260 (–69)
	6	Cameron Hayley	254 (–75)
1	7	Spencer Gallagher	251 (–78)
1	8	Daniel Hemric	246 (–83)
	9	Timothy Peters	245 (–84)
1	10	Ben Kennedy	238 (–91)
Official driver's standings

- Note: Only the first 10 positions are included for the driver standings.

Previous race: 2015 WinStar World Casino & Resort 400	NASCAR Camping World Truck Series; 2015 season	Next race: 2015 American Ethanol 200
