= 2015 Toyota Tundra 250 =

4th race of the 2015 NASCAR Camping World Truck Series

Race details
- Race 4 of 23 of the 2015 NASCAR Camping World Truck Series
- Date: May 8, 2015
- Official name: 15th Annual Toyota Tundra 250
- Location: Kansas Speedway, Kansas City, Kansas
- Course: Permanent racing facility
- Course length: 1.5 miles (2.4 km)
- Distance: 167 laps, 250 mi (403 km)
- Scheduled distance: 167 laps, 250 mi (403 km)
- Average speed: 139.857 mph (225.078 km/h)

Pole position
Driver	Erik Jones	Kyle Busch Motorsports
- Time: 30.101

Most laps led
Driver	Erik Jones	Kyle Busch Motorsports
- Laps: 151

Winner
No. 88	Matt Crafton	ThorSport Racing

Television in the United States
- Network: FS1
- Announcers: Adam Alexander, Phil Parsons, and Michael Waltrip

Radio in the United States
- Radio: MRN

The 2015 Toyota Tundra 250 was the 4th stock car race of the 2015 NASCAR Camping World Truck Series, and the 15th iteration of the event. The race was held on Friday, May 8, 2015, in Kansas City, Kansas at Kansas Speedway, a 1.5 mile (2.4 km) permanent tri-oval shaped racetrack. The race took the scheduled 167 laps to complete. In a wild finish that was based on fuel mileage, Matt Crafton, driving for ThorSport Racing, would win the race after the leader of Daniel Suárez ran out of fuel on the last lap. This was Crafton's seventh career NASCAR Camping World Truck Series win, and his second of the season. Erik Jones had dominated the entire race, leading a race-high 151 laps, until he ran out of fuel with eight laps to go. To fill out the podium, Ryan Newman, driving for SWM-NEMCO Motorsports, and Johnny Sauter, driving for ThorSport Racing, would finish 2nd and 3rd, respectively.

== Background ==
The layout of Kansas Speedway, the circuit where the race was held.

Kansas Speedway is a 1.500 mi (2.414 km) tri-oval race track in the Village West area near Kansas City, Kansas, United States. It was built in 2001 and it currently hosts two annual NASCAR race weekends. The IndyCar Series also held races at the venue until 2011. The speedway is owned and operated by NASCAR.

=== Entry list ===
- (R) denotes rookie driver.
- (i) denotes driver who is ineligible for series driver points.

#	Driver	Team	Make	Sponsor
0	Caleb Roark	Jennifer Jo Cobb Racing	Chevrolet	Grimes Irrigation & Construction
1	Ryan Ellis	MAKE Motorsports	Chevrolet	Ehlers-Danlos Society
02	Tyler Young	Young's Motorsports	Chevrolet	Randco, Young's Building Systems
03	Mike Affarano (i)	Mike Affarano Motorsports	Chevrolet	Mike Affarano Motorsports
4	Erik Jones (R)	Kyle Busch Motorsports	Toyota	Toyota
05	John Wes Townley	Athenian Motorsports	Chevrolet	Zaxby's
6	Norm Benning	Norm Benning Racing	Chevrolet	Norm Benning Racing
07	Ray Black Jr. (R)	SS-Green Light Racing	Chevrolet	ScubaLife
08	Korbin Forrister (R)	BJMM with SS-Green Light Racing	Chevrolet	Tilted Kilt
8	Ryan Newman (i)	SWM-NEMCO Motorsports	Chevrolet	Rescue Ranch
10	Jennifer Jo Cobb	Jennifer Jo Cobb Racing	Chevrolet	Mark One Electric
11	Ben Kennedy	Red Horse Racing	Toyota	Local Motors, SpongeBob SquarePants
13	Cameron Hayley (R)	ThorSport Racing	Toyota	Cabinets by Hayley
14	Daniel Hemric (R)	NTS Motorsports	Chevrolet	California Clean Power
15	Mason Mingus	Billy Boat Motorsports	Chevrolet	Call 811 Before You Dig
17	Timothy Peters	Red Horse Racing	Toyota	Red Horse Racing
19	Tyler Reddick	Brad Keselowski Racing	Ford	BBR Music Group
23	Spencer Gallagher (R)	GMS Racing	Chevrolet	Allegiant Travel Company
25	Matt Tifft	Venturini Motorsports	Toyota	Clinical RM
29	Austin Theriault (R)	Brad Keselowski Racing	Ford	Cooper-Standard Automotive
31	Scott Lagasse Jr. (i)	NTS Motorsports	Chevrolet	Boy Scouts of America
33	Brandon Jones (R)	GMS Racing	Chevrolet	Masterforce Tool Storage
36	Justin Jennings	MB Motorsports	Chevrolet	Mittler Bros. Machine & Tool
45	B. J. McLeod	B. J. McLeod Motorsports	Chevrolet	Tilted Kilt
50	Travis Kvapil	MAKE Motorsports	Chevrolet	Burnie Grill
51	Daniel Suárez (i)	Kyle Busch Motorsports	Toyota	Arris
54	Justin Boston (R)	Kyle Busch Motorsports	Toyota	ZLOOP
63	Tyler Tanner	MB Motorsports	Chevrolet	Vatterott College, Ski Soda
74	Jordan Anderson	Mike Harmon Racing	Chevrolet	Corpe Consulting, Impact Racing Products
88	Matt Crafton	ThorSport Racing	Toyota	Slim Jim, Menards
94	Wendell Chavous	Premium Motorsports	Chevrolet	Tertoril, The Glow Zone
98	Johnny Sauter	ThorSport Racing	Toyota	Smokey Mountain Herbal Snuff
Official entry list

== Practice ==
The first and only practice session was held on Thursday, May 7, at 5:00 PM CST, and would last for 90 minutes. Cameron Hayley, driving for ThorSport Racing, would set the fastest time in the session, with a lap of 30.717, and an average speed of 175.798 mph (282.919 km/h). Two practice sessions were scheduled to take place, but due to constant rain showers, only one 90-minute session was run.

Pos.	#	Driver	Team	Make	Time	Speed
1	13	Cameron Hayley (R)	ThorSport Racing	Toyota	30.717	175.798
2	14	Daniel Hemric (R)	NTS Motorsports	Chevrolet	30.759	175.558
3	51	Daniel Suárez (i)	Kyle Busch Motorsports	Toyota	30.788	175.393
Official practice results

== Qualifying ==
Qualifying was held on Friday, May 8, at 11:15 AM EST. The qualifying system used is a multi car, multi lap, three round system where in the first round, everyone would set a time to determine positions 25–32. Then, the fastest 24 qualifiers would move on to the second round to determine positions 13–24. Lastly, the fastest 12 qualifiers would move on to the third round to determine positions 1–12.

Erik Jones, driving for Kyle Busch Motorsports, would win the pole after advancing from the preliminary rounds and setting the fastest time in Round 3, with a lap of 30.101, and an average speed of 179.396 mph (288.710 km/h).

No drivers would fail to qualify.

=== Full qualifying results ===
Pos.	#	Driver	Team	Make	Time (R1)	Speed (R1)	Time (R2)	Speed (R2)	Time (R3)	Speed (R3)
1	4	Erik Jones (R)	Kyle Busch Motorsports	Toyota	–*	–*	–*	–*	30.101	179.396
2	88	Matt Crafton	ThorSport Racing	Toyota	–*	–*	–*	–*	30.421	177.509
3	33	Brandon Jones (R)	GMS Racing	Chevrolet	–*	–*	–*	–*	30.484	177.142
4	8	Ryan Newman (i)	SWM-NEMCO Motorsports	Chevrolet	–*	–*	–*	–*	30.552	176.748
5	11	Ben Kennedy	Red Horse Racing	Toyota	–*	–*	–*	–*	30.635	176.269
6	14	Daniel Hemric (R)	NTS Motorsports	Chevrolet	–*	–*	–*	–*	30.649	176.188
7	98	Johnny Sauter	ThorSport Racing	Toyota	–*	–*	–*	–*	30.663	176.108
8	13	Cameron Hayley (R)	ThorSport Racing	Toyota	–*	–*	–*	–*	30.758	175.564
9	54	Justin Boston (R)	Kyle Busch Motorsports	Toyota	–*	–*	–*	–*	30.799	175.330
10	51	Daniel Suárez (i)	Kyle Busch Motorsports	Toyota	–*	–*	–*	–*	30.963	174.402
11	31	Scott Lagasse Jr. (i)	NTS Motorsports	Chevrolet	–*	–*	–*	–*	31.313	172.452
12	17	Timothy Peters	Red Horse Racing	Toyota	–*	–*	–*	–*	31.389	172.035
Eliminated in Round 2
13	15	Mason Mingus	Billy Boat Motorsports	Chevrolet	–*	–*	30.965	174.390	–	–
14	23	Spencer Gallagher (R)	GMS Racing	Chevrolet	–*	–*	31.043	173.952	–	–
15	05	John Wes Townley	Athenian Motorsports	Chevrolet	–*	–*	31.075	173.773	–	–
16	07	Ray Black Jr. (R)	SS-Green Light Racing	Chevrolet	–*	–*	31.128	173.477	–	–
17	02	Tyler Young	Young's Motorsports	Chevrolet	–*	–*	31.321	172.408	–	–
18	25	Matt Tifft	Venturini Motorsports	Toyota	–*	–*	31.441	171.750	–	–
19	08	Korbin Forrister (R)	BJMM with SS-Green Light Racing	Chevrolet	–*	–*	31.767	169.988	–	–
20	45	B. J. McLeod	B. J. McLeod Motorsports	Chevrolet	–*	–*	31.991	168.797	–	–
21	10	Jennifer Jo Cobb	Jennifer Jo Cobb Racing	Chevrolet	–*	–*	32.332	167.017	–	–
22	19	Tyler Reddick	Brad Keselowski Racing	Ford	–*	–*	–	–	–	–
23	29	Austin Theriault (R)	Brad Keselowski Racing	Ford	–*	–*	–	–	–	–
24	94	Wendell Chavous	Premium Motorsports	Chevrolet	–*	–*	–	–	–	–
Eliminated in Round 1
25	63	Tyler Tanner	MB Motorsports	Chevrolet	32.043	168.524	–	–	–	–
26	1	Ryan Ellis	MAKE Motorsports	Chevrolet	32.149	167.968	–	–	–	–
27	74	Jordan Anderson	Mike Harmon Racing	Chevrolet	32.149	167.968	–	–	–	–
Qualified by owner's points
28	50	Travis Kvapil	MAKE Motorsports	Chevrolet	32.220	167.598	–	–	–	–
29	6	Norm Benning	Norm Benning Racing	Chevrolet	34.112	158.302	–	–	–	–
Qualified by time
30	36	Justin Jennings	MB Motorsports	Chevrolet	33.045	163.414	–	–	–	–
31	0	Caleb Roark	Jennifer Jo Cobb Racing	Chevrolet	35.836	150.686	–	–	–	–
32	03	Mike Affarano (i)	Mike Affarano Motorsports	Chevrolet	33.637	160.538	–	–	–	–
Official starting lineup

*Time unavailable

== Race results ==
Fin	St	#	Driver	Team	Make	Laps	Led	Status	Pts	Winnings
1	2	88	Matt Crafton	ThorSport Racing	Toyota	167	6	Running	47	$49,832
2	4	8	Ryan Newman (i)	SWM-NEMCO Motorsports	Chevrolet	167	2	Running	0	$33,959
3	7	98	Johnny Sauter	ThorSport Racing	Toyota	167	0	Running	41	$27,351
4	12	17	Timothy Peters	Red Horse Racing	Toyota	167	0	Running	40	$23,431
5	8	13	Cameron Hayley (R)	ThorSport Racing	Toyota	167	0	Running	39	$20,652
6	10	51	Daniel Suárez (i)	Kyle Busch Motorsports	Toyota	167	1	Running	0	$17,277
7	9	54	Justin Boston (R)	Kyle Busch Motorsports	Toyota	166	0	Running	37	$19,064
8	11	31	Scott Lagasse Jr. (i)	NTS Motorsports	Chevrolet	166	0	Running	0	$18,686
9	13	15	Mason Mingus	Billy Boat Motorsports	Chevrolet	166	0	Running	35	$18,602
10	6	14	Daniel Hemric (R)	NTS Motorsports	Chevrolet	166	0	Running	34	$19,502
11	1	4	Erik Jones (R)	Kyle Busch Motorsports	Toyota	166	151	Running	35	$20,796
12	15	05	John Wes Townley	Athenian Motorsports	Chevrolet	166	0	Running	32	$18,362
13	22	19	Tyler Reddick	Brad Keselowski Racing	Ford	165	7	Running	32	$18,283
14	23	29	Austin Theriault (R)	Brad Keselowski Racing	Ford	165	0	Running	30	$18,228
15	25	63	Tyler Tanner	MB Motorsports	Chevrolet	165	0	Running	29	$18.772
16	24	94	Wendell Chavous	Premium Motorsports	Chevrolet	164	0	Running	28	$18.093
17	14	23	Spencer Gallagher (R)	GMS Racing	Chevrolet	163	0	Running	27	$18,015
18	27	74	Jordan Anderson	Mike Harmon Racing	Chevrolet	159	0	Running	26	$15,715
19	21	10	Jennifer Jo Cobb	Jennifer Jo Cobb Racing	Chevrolet	154	0	Running	25	$17,909
20	26	1	Ryan Ellis	MAKE Motorsports	Chevrolet	154	0	Running	24	$18,330
21	16	07	Ray Black Jr. (R)	SS-Green Light Racing	Chevrolet	109	0	Engine	23	$17,803
22	19	08	Korbin Forrister (R)	BJMM with SS-Green Light Racing	Chevrolet	90	0	Rear Gear	22	$16,530
23	17	02	Tyler Young	Young's Motorsports	Chevrolet	74	0	Accident	21	$16,503
24	29	6	Norm Benning	Norm Benning Racing	Chevrolet	69	0	Vibration	20	$15,474
25	28	50	Travis Kvapil	MAKE Motorsports	Chevrolet	60	0	Rear Gear	19	$15,597
26	5	11	Ben Kennedy	Red Horse Racing	Toyota	57	0	Overheating	18	$15,419
27	30	36	Justin Jennings	MB Motorsports	Chevrolet	24	0	Brakes	17	$15,391
28	20	45	B. J. McLeod	B. J. McLeod Motorsports	Chevrolet	18	0	Vibration	16	$15,133
29	18	25	Matt Tifft	Venturini Motorsports	Toyota	18	0	Oil Leak	15	$15,072
30	3	33	Brandon Jones (R)	GMS Racing	Chevrolet	11	0	Accident	14	$14,572
31	32	03	Mike Affarano (i)	Mike Affarano Motorsports	Chevrolet	6	0	Ignition	0	$13,072
32	31	0	Caleb Roark	Jennifer Jo Cobb Racing	Chevrolet	5	0	Electrical	12	$12,072
Official race results

== Standings after the race ==
Drivers' Championship standings

	Pos	Driver	Points
	1	Matt Crafton	175
	2	Tyler Reddick	158 (-17)
	3	Erik Jones	157 (–18)
	4	Johnny Sauter	153 (–22)
3	5	Cameron Hayley	123 (–52)
	6	John Wes Townley	122 (–53)
4	7	Timothy Peters	121 (–54)
5	8	Justin Boston	114 (–61)
2	9	Ray Black Jr.	112 (–63)
1	10	Spencer Gallagher	111 (–64)
Official driver's standings

- Note: Only the first 10 positions are included for the driver standings.

Previous race: 2015 Kroger 250	NASCAR Camping World Truck Series; 2015 season	Next race: 2015 North Carolina Education Lottery 200
