= 2015 WinStar World Casino & Resort 400 =

7th race of the 2015 NASCAR Camping World Truck Series

Race details
- Race 7 of 23 of the 2015 NASCAR Camping World Truck Series
- Date: June 5, 2015
- Official name: 19th Annual WinStar World Casino & Resort 400
- Location: Texas Motor Speedway, Fort Worth, Texas
- Course: Permanent racing facility
- Course length: 1.5 miles (2.4 km)
- Distance: 167 laps, 250 mi (403 km)
- Scheduled distance: 167 laps, 250 mi (403 km)
- Average speed: 102.990 mph (165.746 km/h)

Pole position
Driver	Erik Jones	Kyle Busch Motorsports
- Time: 29.822

Most laps led
Driver	Matt Crafton	ThorSport Racing
- Laps: 77

Winner
No. 88	Matt Crafton	ThorSport Racing

Television in the United States
- Network: FS1
- Announcers: Ralph Sheheen, Phil Parsons, and Michael Waltrip

Radio in the United States
- Radio: MRN

The 2015 WinStar World Casino & Resort 400 was the 7th stock car race of the 2015 NASCAR Camping World Truck Series, and the 19th iteration of the event. The race was held on Friday, June 5, 2015, in Fort Worth, Texas at Texas Motor Speedway, a 1.5 mile (2.4 km) permanent tri-oval shaped racetrack. The race took the scheduled 167 laps to complete. Matt Crafton, driving for ThorSport Racing, would hold off the field on the final restart, earning his eighth career NASCAR Camping World Truck Series win, and his third of the season. Crafton and pole-sitter Erik Jones dominated the entire race, leading 77 and 68 laps respectively. To fill out the podium, Daniel Suárez, driving for Kyle Busch Motorsports, and John Wes Townley, driving for Athenian Motorsports, would finish 2nd and 3rd, respectively.

== Background ==
The layout of Texas Motor Speedway, the circuit where the race was held.

Texas Motor Speedway is a speedway located in the northernmost portion of the U.S. city of Fort Worth, Texas – the portion located in Denton County, Texas. The reconfigured track measures 1.500 mi (2.414 km) with banked 20° in turns 1 and 2 and banked 24° in turns 3 and 4. Texas Motor Speedway is a quad-oval design, where the front straightaway juts outward slightly. The track layout is similar to Atlanta Motor Speedway and Charlotte Motor Speedway. The track is owned by Speedway Motorsports, Inc. Nicknamed “The Great American Speedway“ the racetrack facility is one of the largest motorsports venues in the world capable of hosting crowds in excess of 200,000 spectators.

=== Entry list ===
- (R) denotes rookie driver.
- (i) denotes driver who is ineligible for series driver points.

#	Driver	Team	Make	Sponsor
0	Adam Edwards	Jennifer Jo Cobb Racing	Chevrolet	Driven2Honor.org
1	Ryan Ellis	MAKE Motorsports	Chevrolet	MAKE Motorsports
02	Tyler Young	Young's Motorsports	Chevrolet	Randco, Young's Building Systems
03	Mike Affarano (i)	Mike Affarano Motorsports	Chevrolet	Mike Affarano Motorsports
4	Erik Jones (R)	Kyle Busch Motorsports	Toyota	Special Olympics World Games
05	John Wes Townley	Athenian Motorsports	Chevrolet	Zaxby's
6	Norm Benning	Norm Benning Racing	Chevrolet	Boedeker Construction
07	Ray Black Jr. (R)	SS-Green Light Racing	Chevrolet	ScubaLife
08	Korbin Forrister (R)	BJMM with SS-Green Light Racing	Chevrolet	Tilted Kilt
8	Joe Nemechek	SWM-NEMCO Motorsports	Chevrolet	SWM-NEMCO Motorsports
10	Jennifer Jo Cobb	Jennifer Jo Cobb Racing	Chevrolet	Grimes Irrigation & Construction
11	Ben Kennedy	Red Horse Racing	Toyota	Local Motors
13	Cameron Hayley (R)	ThorSport Racing	Toyota	Cabinets by Hayley
14	Daniel Hemric (R)	NTS Motorsports	Chevrolet	California Clean Power
15	Mason Mingus	Billy Boat Motorsports	Chevrolet	Call 811 Before You Dig
17	Timothy Peters	Red Horse Racing	Toyota	Red Horse Racing
19	Tyler Reddick	Brad Keselowski Racing	Ford	Bulldog
23	Spencer Gallagher (R)	GMS Racing	Chevrolet	Allegiant Travel Company
29	Austin Theriault (R)	Brad Keselowski Racing	Ford	Cooper-Standard Automotive
33	Brandon Jones (R)	GMS Racing	Chevrolet	Century A/C Supply
36	Justin Jennings	MB Motorsports	Chevrolet	Mittler Bros. Machine & Tool, Ski Soda
45	B. J. McLeod	B. J. McLeod Motorsports	Chevrolet	Tilted Kilt
50	Donnie Neuenberger	MAKE Motorsports	Chevrolet	Burnie Grill
51	Daniel Suárez (i)	Kyle Busch Motorsports	Toyota	Arris
54	Justin Boston (R)	Kyle Busch Motorsports	Toyota	ROK Mobile
63	Tyler Tanner	MB Motorsports	Chevrolet	Mittler Bros. Machine & Tool, Ski Soda
74	Jordan Anderson	Mike Harmon Racing	Chevrolet	Knight Fire Protection
88	Matt Crafton	ThorSport Racing	Toyota	Ideal Door, Menards
94	Timmy Hill	Premium Motorsports	Chevrolet	Premium Motorsports
98	Johnny Sauter	ThorSport Racing	Toyota	Nextant Aerospace, Curb Records
Official entry list

== Practice ==
=== First practice ===
The first practice session was held on Thursday, June 4, at 4:30 PM CST, and would last for 55 minutes. Spencer Gallagher, driving for GMS Racing, would set the fastest time in the session, with a lap of 30.268, and an average speed of 178.406 mph (287.117 km/h).

Pos.	#	Driver	Team	Make	Time	Speed
1	23	Spencer Gallagher (R)	GMS Racing	Chevrolet	30.268	178.406
2	98	Johnny Sauter	ThorSport Racing	Toyota	30.430	177.456
3	19	Tyler Reddick	Brad Keselowski Racing	Ford	30.442	177.387
Full practice results

=== Final practice ===
The final practice session was held on Thursday, June 4, at 6:30 PM CST, and would last for 1 hour and 25 minutes. Matt Crafton, driving for ThorSport Racing, would set the fastest time in the session, with a lap of 30.241, and an average speed of 178.566 mph (287.374 km/h).

Pos.	#	Driver	Team	Make	Time	Speed
1	88	Matt Crafton	ThorSport Racing	Toyota	30.241	178.566
2	19	Tyler Reddick	Brad Keselowski Racing	Ford	30.241	178.566
3	51	Daniel Suárez (i)	Kyle Busch Motorsports	Toyota	30.342	177.971
Full practice results

== Qualifying ==
Qualifying was held on Friday, June 5, at 5:15 PM CST. The qualifying system used is a multi car, multi lap, three round system where in the first round, everyone would set a time to determine positions 25–32. Then, the fastest 24 qualifiers would move on to the second round to determine positions 13–24. Lastly, the fastest 12 qualifiers would move on to third round to determine positions 1–12.

Erik Jones, driving for Kyle Busch Motorsports, would win the pole after advancing from the preliminary rounds and setting the fastest time in Round 3, with a lap of 29.822, and an average speed of 181.074 mph (291.410 km/h).

No driver would fail to qualify

=== Full qualifying results ===
Pos.	#	Driver	Team	Make	Time (R1)	Speed (R1)	Time (R2)	Speed (R2)	Time (R3)	Speed (R3)
1	4	Erik Jones (R)	Kyle Busch Motorsports	Toyota	29.984	180.096	30.054	179.677	29.822	181.074
2	88	Matt Crafton	ThorSport Racing	Toyota	30.500	177.049	30.096	179.426	29.937	180.379
3	51	Daniel Suárez (i)	Kyle Busch Motorsports	Toyota	30.126	179.247	29.926	180.445	30.019	179.886
4	98	Johnny Sauter	ThorSport Racing	Toyota	30.505	177.020	30.125	179.253	30.091	179.456
5	05	John Wes Townley	Athenian Motorsports	Chevrolet	30.558	176.713	29.909	180.548	30.153	179.087
6	29	Austin Theriault (R)	Brad Keselowski Racing	Ford	30.079	179.527	30.223	178.672	30.201	178.802
7	17	Timothy Peters	Red Horse Racing	Toyota	30.112	179.330	30.110	179.342	30.214	178.725
8	13	Cameron Hayley (R)	ThorSport Racing	Toyota	29.977	180.138	30.227	178.648	30.295	178.247
9	14	Daniel Hemric (R)	NTS Motorsports	Chevrolet	30.072	179.569	30.011	179.934	30.332	178.030
10	8	Joe Nemechek	SWM-NEMCO Motorsports	Chevrolet	30.236	178.595	30.268	178.406	30.435	177.427
11	54	Justin Boston (R)	Kyle Busch Motorsports	Toyota	30.814	175.245	30.229	178.636	30.543	176.800
12	11	Ben Kennedy	Red Horse Racing	Toyota	30.014	179.916	30.232	178.619	30.823	175.194
Eliminated in Round 2
13	23	Spencer Gallagher (R)	GMS Racing	Chevrolet	29.990	180.060	30.288	178.288	–	–
14	33	Brandon Jones (R)	GMS Racing	Chevrolet	30.235	178.601	30.332	178.030	–	–
15	15	Mason Mingus	Billy Boat Motorsports	Chevrolet	30.215	178.719	30.399	177.637	–	–
16	19	Tyler Reddick	Brad Keselowski Racing	Ford	29.815	181.117	30.409	177.579	–	–
17	63	Tyler Tanner	MB Motorsports	Chevrolet	30.404	177.608	30.455	177.311	–	–
18	07	Ray Black Jr. (R)	SS-Green Light Racing	Chevrolet	30.542	176.806	30.506	177.014	–	–
19	02	Tyler Young	Young's Motorsports	Chevrolet	30.449	177.346	30.633	176.280	–	–
20	10	Jennifer Jo Cobb	Jennifer Jo Cobb Racing	Chevrolet	30.958	174.430	31.160	173.299	–	–
21	08	Korbin Forrister (R)	BJMM with SS-Green Light Racing	Chevrolet	30.960	174.419	31.185	173.160	–	–
22	1	Ryan Ellis	MAKE Motorsports	Chevrolet	31.213	173.005	31.712	170.283	–	–
23	36	Justin Jennings	MB Motorsports	Chevrolet	31.376	172.106	–	–	–	–
24	94	Timmy Hill	Premium Motorsports	Chevrolet	31.411	171.914	–	–	–	–
Eliminated in Round 1
25	74	Jordan Anderson	Mike Harmon Racing	Chevrolet	31.441	171.750	–	–	–	–
26	45	B. J. McLeod	B. J. McLeod Motorsports	Chevrolet	32.153	167.947	–	–	–	–
27	6	Norm Benning	Norm Benning Racing	Chevrolet	33.058	163.349	–	–	–	–
Qualified by owner's points
28	0	Adam Edwards	Jennifer Jo Cobb Racing	Chevrolet	33.846	159.546	–	–	–	–
29	50	Donnie Neuenberger	MAKE Motorsports	Chevrolet	34.204	157.876	–	–	–	–
Qualified by time
30	03	Mike Affarano (i)	Mike Affarano Motorsports	Chevrolet	36.595	147.561	–	–	–	–
Official qualifying results
Official starting lineup

the

== Race results ==
Fin	St	#	Driver	Team	Make	Laps	Led	Status	Pts	Winnings
1	2	88	Matt Crafton	ThorSport Racing	Toyota	167	77	Running	48	$59,959
2	3	51	Daniel Suárez (i)	Kyle Busch Motorsports	Toyota	167	6	Running	0	$41,559
3	5	05	John Wes Townley	Athenian Motorsports	Chevrolet	167	0	Running	41	$34,099
4	4	98	Johnny Sauter	ThorSport Racing	Toyota	167	0	Running	40	$24,132
5	6	29	Austin Theriault (R)	Brad Keselowski Racing	Ford	167	0	Running	39	$20,943
6	10	8	Joe Nemechek	SWM-NEMCO Motorsports	Chevrolet	167	0	Running	38	$18,123
7	8	13	Cameron Hayley (R)	ThorSport Racing	Toyota	167	3	Running	38	$17,316
8	11	54	Justin Boston (R)	Kyle Busch Motorsports	Toyota	167	1	Running	37	$16,841
9	9	14	Daniel Hemric (R)	NTS Motorsports	Chevrolet	167	0	Running	35	$16,824
10	12	11	Ben Kennedy	Red Horse Racing	Ford	167	0	Running	34	$17,709
11	16	19	Tyler Reddick	Brad Keselowski Racing	Ford	166	1	Running	34	$16,677
12	13	23	Spencer Gallagher (R)	GMS Racing	Chevrolet	166	0	Running	32	$16,511
13	15	15	Mason Mingus	Billy Boat Motorsports	Chevrolet	166	0	Running	31	$16,468
14	19	02	Tyler Young	Young's Motorsports	Chevrolet	165	0	Running	30	$16,363
15	1	4	Erik Jones (R)	Kyle Busch Motorsports	Toyota	165	68	Running	30	$19,165
16	18	07	Ray Black Jr. (R)	SS-Green Light Racing	Chevrolet	164	1	Running	29	$16,167
17	17	63	Tyler Tanner	MB Motorsports	Chevrolet	164	5	Running	28	$16,068
18	21	08	Korbin Forrister (R)	BJMM with SS-Green Light Racing	Chevrolet	160	0	Running	26	$15,969
19	20	10	Jennifer Jo Cobb	Jennifer Jo Cobb Racing	Chevrolet	157	0	Running	25	$15,817
20	22	1	Ryan Ellis	MAKE Motorsports	Chevrolet	152	0	Running	24	$14,968
21	7	17	Timothy Peters	Red Horse Racing	Toyota	147	5	Engine	24	$14,370
22	14	33	Brandon Jones (R)	GMS Racing	Chevrolet	127	0	Running	22	$13,272
23	24	94	Timmy Hill	Premium Motorsports	Chevrolet	49	0	Engine	21	$13,173
24	25	74	Jordan Anderson	Mike Harmon Racing	Chevrolet	47	0	Engine	20	$13,074
25	27	6	Norm Benning	Norm Benning Racing	Chevrolet	23	0	Clutch	19	$13,126
26	23	36	Justin Jennings	MB Motorsports	Chevrolet	12	0	Electrical	18	$12,878
27	26	45	B. J. McLeod	B. J. McLeod Motorsports	Chevrolet	10	0	Electrical	17	$12,779
28	29	50	Donnie Neuenberger	MAKE Motorsports	Chevrolet	8	0	Engine	16	$12,444
29	30	03	Mike Affarano (i)	Mike Affarano Motorsports	Chevrolet	6	0	Vibration	0	$12,340
30	28	0	Adam Edwards	Jennifer Jo Cobb Racing	Chevrolet	5	0	Rear Gear	14	$11,840
Official race results

== Standings after the race ==
Drivers' Championship standings

	Pos	Driver	Points
	1	Matt Crafton	305
	2	Tyler Reddick	280 (-25)
	3	Erik Jones	273 (–32)
	4	Johnny Sauter	257 (–48)
	5	John Wes Townley	227 (–78)
1	6	Cameron Hayley	215 (–90)
2	7	Daniel Hemric	211 (–94)
	8	Spencer Gallagher	209 (–96)
3	9	Timothy Peters	207 (–98)
1	10	Justin Boston	205 (–100)
Official driver's standings

- Note: Only the first 10 positions are included for the driver standings.

Previous race: 2015 Lucas Oil 200	NASCAR Camping World Truck Series; 2015 season	Next race: 2015 Drivin' for Linemen 200
