= 2018 Overton's 225 =

Race details
- Race 11 of 23 of the 2018 NASCAR Camping World Truck Series
- Date: June 29, 2018
- Official name: Overton's 225
- Location: Joliet, Illinois, Chicagoland Speedway
- Course: Permanent racing facility
- Course length: 1.5 miles (2.41 km)
- Distance: 150 laps, 225 mi (362.102 km)
- Scheduled distance: 150 laps, 225 mi (362.102 km)
- Average speed: 119.346 miles per hour (192.069 km/h)

Pole position
Driver	Noah Gragson	Kyle Busch Motorsports
- Time: 30.834

Most laps led
Driver	John Hunter Nemechek	NEMCO Motorsports
- Laps: 64

Winner
No. 16	Brett Moffitt	Hattori Racing Enterprises

Television in the United States
- Network: Fox Sports 1
- Announcers: Vince Welch, Phil Parsons, Michael Waltrip

Radio in the United States
- Radio: Motor Racing Network

The 2018 Overton's 225 was the 11th stock car race of the 2018 NASCAR Camping World Truck Series season and the 10th iteration of the event. The race was held on Friday, June 29, 2018, in Joliet, Illinois at Chicagoland Speedway, a 1.5 miles (2.4 km) permanent D-shaped oval. The race took the scheduled 150 laps to complete. At race's end, a hard-charging Brett Moffitt, driving for Hattori Racing Enterprises would pass the fuel-ailing John Hunter Nemechek of NEMCO Motorsports on the final lap to take Moffitt's 4th career win in the NASCAR Camping World Truck Series and his 3rd of the season. To fill out the podium, Ben Rhodes of ThorSport Racing and Johnny Sauter of GMS Racing would finish 2nd and 3rd, respectively.

== Background ==
The layout of Chicagoland Speedway, the venue where the race was held.

Chicagoland Speedway is a 1.5 miles (2.4 km) tri-oval speedway in Joliet, Illinois, southwest of Chicago. The speedway opened in 2001 and currently hosts NASCAR races. Until 2011, the speedway also hosted the IndyCar Series, recording numerous close finishes, including the closest finish in IndyCar history. The speedway is owned and operated by International Speedway Corporation and is located adjacent to Route 66 Raceway.

=== Entry list ===
#	Driver	Team	Make	Sponsor
0	Camden Murphy	Jennifer Jo Cobb Racing	Chevrolet	Jennifer Jo Cobb Racing
2	Cody Coughlin	GMS Racing	Chevrolet	Jegs Patriotic
02	Austin Hill	Young's Motorsports	Chevrolet	Young's Building Systems
3	Jordan Anderson	Jordan Anderson Racing	Chevrolet	Bommarito Automotive Group
03	Mike Affarano*	Mike Affarano Motorsports	Chevrolet	Calumet City Auto Parts "Stop Bullying"
4	Todd Gilliland	Kyle Busch Motorsports	Toyota	Mobil 1
6	Norm Benning	Norm Benning Racing	Chevrolet	Zomongo
7	Korbin Forrister	All Out Motorsports	Toyota	N. O. W. Matters More
8	John Hunter Nemechek	NEMCO Motorsports	Chevrolet	Fleetwing
10	Jennifer Jo Cobb	Jennifer Jo Cobb Racing	Chevrolet	Driven2Honor.org
13	Myatt Snider	ThorSport Racing	Ford	Century Container
15	Ross Chastain	Premium Motorsports	Chevrolet	Premium Motorsports
16	Brett Moffitt	Hattori Racing Enterprises	Toyota	Fr8Auctions
18	Noah Gragson	Kyle Busch Motorsports	Toyota	Safelite Auto Glass
20	Max Tullman	Young's Motorsports	Chevrolet	Yurpal
21	Johnny Sauter	GMS Racing	Chevrolet	ISM Connect Patriotic
22	Austin Wayne Self	Niece Motorsports	Chevrolet	AM Technical Solutions, GO TEXAN.
24	Justin Haley	GMS Racing	Chevrolet	Fraternal Order of Eagles Patriotic
25	Dalton Sargeant	GMS Racing	Chevrolet	Performance Plus Motor Oil
33	Josh Reaume	Reaume Brothers Racing	Chevrolet	Pit Barrel Cooker Company
41	Ben Rhodes	ThorSport Racing	Ford	Alpha Energy Solutions
45	Justin Fontaine	Niece Motorsports	Chevrolet	ProMatic Automation
49	Wendell Chavous	Premium Motorsports	Chevrolet	SobrietyNation.org
50	Brian Kaltreider	Beaver Motorsports	Chevrolet	Image Tech
51	Brandon Jones	Kyle Busch Motorsports	Toyota	American Standard Eljer
52	Stewart Friesen	Halmar Friesen Racing	Chevrolet	Halmar "We Build America"
54	Bo LeMastus	DGR-Crosley	Toyota	Crosley Brands
63	J. J. Yeley	Copp Motorsports	Chevrolet	Copp Motorsports
74	Mike Harmon	Mike Harmon Racing	Chevrolet	Troptions
83	Bayley Currey	Copp Motorsports	Chevrolet	Copp Motorsports
87	Joe Nemechek	NEMCO Motorsports	Chevrolet	NEMCO Motorsports
88	Matt Crafton	ThorSport Racing	Ford	Menards, Shasta
98	Grant Enfinger	ThorSport Racing	Ford	Champion Power Equipment "Powering Your Life."
Official entry list

*Withdrew drew to the team's transporter breaking down while traveling to the track.

== Practice ==
=== First practice ===
The first practice would occur on Thursday, June 28, at 4:30 p.m. CST. Johnny Sauter of GMS Racing would set the fastest lap, with a 31.006 and an average speed of 174.160 miles per hour (280.283 km/h).

Pos.	#	Driver	Team	Make	Time	Speed
1	21	Johnny Sauter	GMS Racing	Chevrolet	31.006	174.160
2	25	Dalton Sargeant	GMS Racing	Chevrolet	31.029	174.031
3	41	Ben Rhodes	ThorSport Racing	Ford	31.133	173.449
Full first practice results

=== Second and final practice ===
The second and final practice would occur on Thursday, June 28, at 6:35 p.m. CST. Todd Gilliland of Kyle Busch Motorsports would set the fastest lap, with a 30.862 and an average speed of 174.972 miles per hour (281.590 km/h).

Pos.	#	Driver	Team	Make	Time	Speed
1	4	Todd Gilliland	Kyle Busch Motorsports	Toyota	30.862	174.972
2	41	Ben Rhodes	ThorSport Racing	Ford	30.995	174.222
3	24	Justin Haley	GMS Racing	Chevrolet	30.060	173.857
Full final practice results

== Qualifying ==
Qualifying would take place on Friday, May 11, at 4:05 p.m. CST. Since Chicagoland Speedway is at least 1.5 miles (2.4 km), the qualifying system was a single car, single lap, two round system where in the first round, everyone would set a time to determine positions 13-32. Then, the fastest 12 qualifiers would move on to the second round to determine positions 1-12.

Noah Gragson would proceed to set the fastest time in both rounds, achieving a lap in the second round of a 30.384 and an average speed of 175.131 miles per hour (281.846 km/h), making Gragson the pole winner for the event. No drivers would fail to qualify.

Pos.	#	Driver	Team	Make	Time (R1)	Speed (R1)	Time (R2)	Speed (R2)
1	18	Noah Gragson	Kyle Busch Motorsports	Toyota	30.850	175.041	30.834	175.131
2	25	Dalton Sargeant	GMS Racing	Chevrolet	30.950	174.475	30.938	174.543
3	8	John Hunter Nemechek	NEMCO Motorsports	Chevrolet	31.145	173.383	30.940	174.531
4	4	Todd Gilliland	Kyle Busch Motorsports	Toyota	30.989	174.225	30.959	174.424
5	52	Stewart Friesen	Halmar Friesen Racing	Chevrolet	31.060	173.857	30.999	174.199
6	16	Brett Moffitt	Hattori Racing Enterprises	Toyota	31.139	173.416	31.023	174.064
7	21	Johnny Sauter	GMS Racing	Chevrolet	31.066	173.823	31.027	174.042
8	88	Matt Crafton	ThorSport Racing	Ford	31.045	173.941	31.027	174.042
9	41	Ben Rhodes	ThorSport Racing	Ford	31.076	173.768	31.044	173.947
10	24	Justin Haley	GMS Racing	Chevrolet	31.072	173.790	31.105	173.606
11	13	Myatt Snider	ThorSport Racing	Ford	31.162	173.288	31.149	173.360
12	2	Cody Coughlin	GMS Racing	Chevrolet	31.130	173.466	31.273	172.673
Eliminated in Round 1
13	98	Grant Enfinger	ThorSport Racing	Ford	31.206	173.044	—	—
14	02	Austin Hill	Young's Motorsports	Chevrolet	31.648	170.627	—	—
15	22	Austin Wayne Self	Niece Motorsports	Chevrolet	31.891	169.327	—	—
16	51	Brandon Jones	Kyle Busch Motorsports	Toyota	31.922	169.162	—	—
17	15	Ross Chastain	Premium Motorsports	Chevrolet	32.079	168.334	—	—
18	54	Bo LeMastus	DGR-Crosley	Toyota	32.198	167.712	—	—
19	45	Justin Fontaine	Niece Motorsports	Chevrolet	32.244	167.473	—	—
20	7	Korbin Forrister	All Out Motorsports	Toyota	32.311	167.126	—	—
21	20	Max Tullman	Young's Motorsports	Chevrolet	32.358	166.883	—	—
22	33	Josh Reaume	Reaume Brothers Racing	Chevrolet	32.570	165.797	—	—
23	87	Joe Nemechek	NEMCO Motorsports	Chevrolet	33.197	162.665	—	—
24	0	Camden Murphy	Jennifer Jo Cobb Racing	Chevrolet	33.220	162.553	—	—
25	83	Bayley Currey	Copp Motorsports	Chevrolet	33.284	162.240	—	—
26	3	Jordan Anderson	Jordan Anderson Racing	Chevrolet	33.395	161.701	—	—
27	63	J. J. Yeley	Copp Motorsports	Chevrolet	33.429	161.536	—	—
Qualified on owner's points
28	74	Mike Harmon	Mike Harmon Racing	Chevrolet	33.503	161.180	—	—
29	10	Jennifer Jo Cobb	Jennifer Jo Cobb Racing	Chevrolet	33.567	160.872	—	—
30	50	Brian Kaltreider	Beaver Motorsports	Chevrolet	34.618	155.988	—	—
31	6	Norm Benning	Norm Benning Racing	Chevrolet	34.891	154.768	—	—
32	49	Wendell Chavous	Premium Motorsports	Chevrolet	—	—	—	—
Withdrew
WD	03	Mike Affarano	Mike Affarano Motorsports	Chevrolet	—	—	—	—
Official qualifying results

== Race results ==
Stage 1 Laps: 35

Fin	#	Driver	Team	Make	Pts
1	8	John Hunter Nemechek	NEMCO Motorsports	Chevrolet	0
2	18	Noah Gragson	Kyle Busch Motorsports	Toyota	9
3	52	Stewart Friesen	Halmar Friesen Racing	Chevrolet	8
4	25	Dalton Sargeant	GMS Racing	Chevrolet	7
5	16	Brett Moffitt	Hattori Racing Enterprises	Toyota	6
6	41	Ben Rhodes	ThorSport Racing	Ford	5
7	21	Johnny Sauter	GMS Racing	Chevrolet	4
8	4	Todd Gilliland	Kyle Busch Motorsports	Toyota	3
9	24	Justin Haley	GMS Racing	Chevrolet	2
10	2	Cody Coughlin	GMS Racing	Chevrolet	1

Stage 2 Laps: 35

Fin	#	Driver	Team	Make	Pts
1	18	Noah Gragson	Kyle Busch Motorsports	Toyota	10
2	16	Brett Moffitt	Hattori Racing Enterprises	Toyota	9
3	8	John Hunter Nemechek	NEMCO Motorsports	Chevrolet	0
4	52	Stewart Friesen	Halmar Friesen Racing	Chevrolet	7
5	21	Johnny Sauter	GMS Racing	Chevrolet	6
6	88	Matt Crafton	ThorSport Racing	Ford	5
7	24	Justin Haley	GMS Racing	Chevrolet	4
8	4	Todd Gilliland	Kyle Busch Motorsports	Toyota	3
9	2	Cody Coughlin	GMS Racing	Chevrolet	2
10	98	Grant Enfinger	ThorSport Racing	Ford	1

Stage 3 Laps: 80

Fin	St	#	Driver	Team	Make	Laps	Led	Status	Pts
1	6	16	Brett Moffitt	Hattori Racing Enterprises	Toyota	150	17	running	55
2	9	41	Ben Rhodes	ThorSport Racing	Ford	150	0	running	40
3	7	21	Johnny Sauter	GMS Racing	Chevrolet	150	0	running	44
4	1	18	Noah Gragson	Kyle Busch Motorsports	Toyota	150	42	running	52
5	16	51	Brandon Jones	Kyle Busch Motorsports	Toyota	150	0	running	0
6	10	24	Justin Haley	GMS Racing	Chevrolet	150	0	running	37
7	3	8	John Hunter Nemechek	NEMCO Motorsports	Chevrolet	150	64	running	0
8	13	98	Grant Enfinger	ThorSport Racing	Ford	150	0	running	30
9	14	02	Austin Hill	Young's Motorsports	Chevrolet	150	0	running	28
10	11	13	Myatt Snider	ThorSport Racing	Ford	149	0	running	27
11	8	88	Matt Crafton	ThorSport Racing	Ford	149	0	running	31
12	12	2	Cody Coughlin	GMS Racing	Chevrolet	149	0	running	28
13	15	22	Austin Wayne Self	Niece Motorsports	Chevrolet	149	0	running	24
14	19	45	Justin Fontaine	Niece Motorsports	Chevrolet	149	0	running	23
15	18	54	Bo LeMastus	DGR-Crosley	Toyota	149	0	running	22
16	4	4	Todd Gilliland	Kyle Busch Motorsports	Toyota	148	0	running	27
17	26	3	Jordan Anderson	Jordan Anderson Racing	Chevrolet	148	0	running	20
18	20	7	Korbin Forrister	All Out Motorsports	Toyota	148	2	running	19
19	5	52	Stewart Friesen	Halmar Friesen Racing	Chevrolet	148	0	running	33
20	2	25	Dalton Sargeant	GMS Racing	Chevrolet	147	24	running	24
21	22	33	Josh Reaume	Reaume Brothers Racing	Chevrolet	147	0	running	16
22	32	49	Wendell Chavous	Premium Motorsports	Chevrolet	146	0	running	15
23	21	20	Max Tullman	Young's Motorsports	Chevrolet	146	0	running	14
24	29	10	Jennifer Jo Cobb	Jennifer Jo Cobb Racing	Chevrolet	138	1	running	13
25	30	50	Brian Kaltreider	Beaver Motorsports	Chevrolet	98	0	suspension	12
26	17	15	Ross Chastain	Premium Motorsports	Chevrolet	51	0	crash	0
27	25	83	Bayley Currey	Copp Motorsports	Chevrolet	45	0	fuel pump	10
28	23	87	Joe Nemechek	NEMCO Motorsports	Chevrolet	29	0	fuel pump	9
29	27	63	J. J. Yeley	Copp Motorsports	Chevrolet	22	0	vibration	0
30	24	0	Camden Murphy	Jennifer Jo Cobb Racing	Chevrolet	11	0	suspension	7
31	31	6	Norm Benning	Norm Benning Racing	Chevrolet	2	0	oil pump	6
32	28	74	Mike Harmon	Mike Harmon Racing	Chevrolet	0	0	oil cooler	0
Withdrew
WD		03	Mike Affarano	Mike Affarano Motorsports	Chevrolet				
Official race results

Previous race: 2018 Eaton 200	NASCAR Camping World Truck Series; 2018 season	Next race: 2018 Buckle Up in Your Truck 225
