= Jake Griffin =

American racing driver (born 1998)

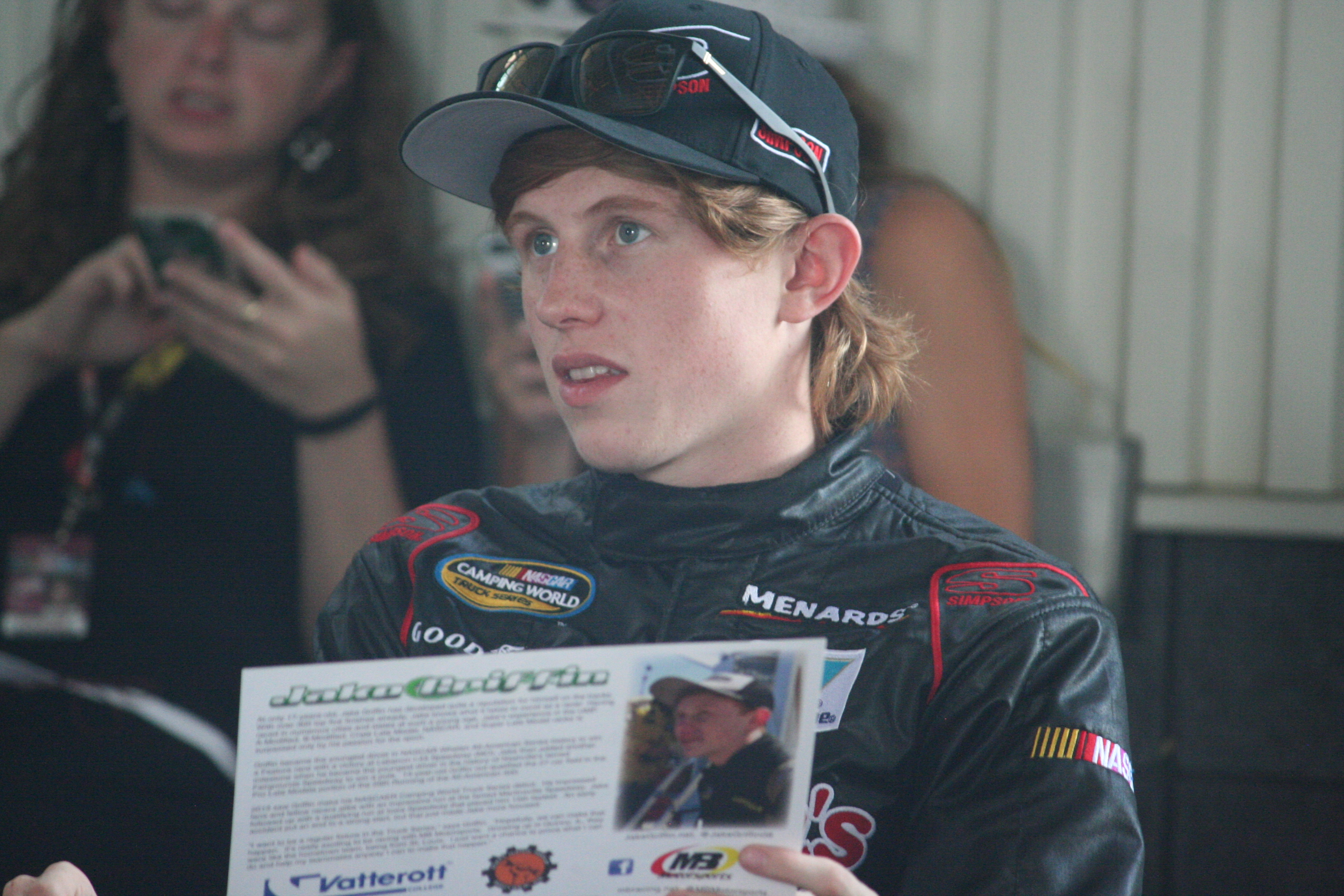
- Griffin at Bristol Motor Speedway in 2016
- Born: Jacob D. Griffin; November 16, 1998 (age 27); Quincy, Illinois, U.S.

NASCAR FedEx Freight Truck Series career
- 9 races run over 4 years
- 2021 position: 53rd
- Best finish: 39th (2016)
- First race: 2015 Kroger 250 (Martinsville)
- Last race: 2021 Toyota 200 (Gateway)
Wins	Top tens	Poles
0	1	0
- Statistics up to date as of December 30, 2021.

Jacob D. Griffin (born November 16, 1998) is an American professional stock car racing driver who last competed part-time in the NASCAR Camping World Truck Series, driving the No. 34 Chevrolet Silverado for Reaume Brothers Racing. He has also raced in the ARCA Menards Series in the past. All of Griffin's starts in both series have come on dirt tracks and short tracks.

== Racing career ==
=== Early years ===
Racing in his early years at a Quincy, Illinois track, Griffin earned the name "Fireball" and raced late models and modifieds.

=== NASCAR and ARCA ===
Griffin broke into the NASCAR Camping World Truck Series in 2015 with MB Motorsports. The deal came about through a mutual friendship between team owner Mike Mittler and Jake's father Danny Griffin, which was formed by working in NASCAR together in 2004. Griffin dropped out of the Kroger 200 with handling problems to finish 26th. Six races later, he crashed out of the race at Iowa Speedway to finish 27th. Attempting the Mudsummer Classic with Mike Affarano Motorsports, he failed to qualify after finishing fourth in the last chance qualifier.

In 2016, Griffin ran at Iowa again with MB, finishing one lap down in 21st. He retired with engine problems at Gateway Motorsports Park, and signed on with Red Horse Racing to run at Eldora Speedway. Qualifying eleventh by way of heat race, Griffin made up seven spots during the race to finish fourth. Also in 2016, Griffin dipped his toe into the ARCA Racing Series, making a single start in the No. 15 Toyota for Venturini Motorsports. Running the SuperChevyStores.com 100 at the Illinois State Fairgrounds Racetrack, he would qualify third and finish ninth in the race.

After not making any NASCAR and ARCA starts in both 2017 and 2018, Griffin returned to the Truck Series for the 2019 Eldora Dirt Derby, driving the No. 03 for Mike Affarano Motorsports for the second time.

Griffin did not make any NASCAR and ARCA starts in 2020, either. However, he did return to the Truck Series again in 2021, as it was announced in January of that year that he would be driving both of the series' new dirt races at Bristol and Knoxville for Reaume Brothers Racing.

== Personal life ==
Griffin works closely with the organization People Against Distracted Driving after meeting the founder online.

== Motorsports career results ==
=== NASCAR ===
(key) (Bold – Pole position awarded by qualifying time. Italics – Pole position earned by points standings or practice time. * – Most laps led.)

==== Camping World Truck Series ====
NASCAR Camping World Truck Series results
Year	Team	No.	Make	1	2	3	4	5	6	7	8	9	10	11	12	13	14	15	16	17	18	19	20	21	22	23	NCWTC	Pts	Ref
2015	MB Motorsports	63	Chevy	DAY	ATL	MAR; 26	KAN	CLT	DOV	TEX	GTW	IOW; 27	KEN														56th	35	
2015	Mike Affarano Motorsports	03	Chevy											ELD; DNQ	POC	MCH	BRI	MSP	CHI	NHA	LVS	TAL	MAR	TEX	PHO	HOM	56th	35	
2016	MB Motorsports	63	Chevy	DAY	ATL	MAR	KAN	DOV	CLT	TEX	IOW; 21	GTW; 30	KEN			BRI; DNQ	MCH	MSP	CHI	NHA	LVS	TAL	MAR	TEX	PHO	HOM	39th	44	
2016	Red Horse Racing	11	Toyota											ELD; 4	POC												39th	44	
2019	Mike Affarano Motorsports	03	Chevy	DAY	ATL	LVS	MAR	TEX	DOV	KAN	CLT	TEX	IOW	GTW	CHI	KEN	POC	ELD; 26	MCH	BRI	MSP	LVS	TAL	MAR	PHO	HOM	85th	11	
2021	Reaume Brothers Racing	34	Chevy	DAY	DAY	LVS	ATL	BRD; 29	RCH	KAN	DAR	COA	CLT	TEX	NSH	POC	KNX; 12	GLN									53rd	36	
2021	Niece Motorsports	45	Chevy																GTW; 34	DAR	BRI	LVS	TAL	MAR	PHO		53rd	36	

^{*} Season still in progress
^{1} Ineligible for series points

=== ARCA Racing Series ===
(key) (Bold – Pole position awarded by qualifying time. Italics – Pole position earned by points standings or practice time. * – Most laps led.)

ARCA Racing Series results
Year	Team	No.	Make	1	2	3	4	5	6	7	8	9	10	11	12	13	14	15	16	17	18	19	20	ARSC	Pts	Ref
2016	Venturini Motorsports	15	Toyota	DAY	NSH	SLM	TAL	TOL	NJE	POC	MCH	MAD	WIN	IOW	IRP	POC	BLN	ISF; 9	DSF	SLM	CHI	KEN	KAN	100th	185	
