= Vatterott College =

Defunct for-profit trade school

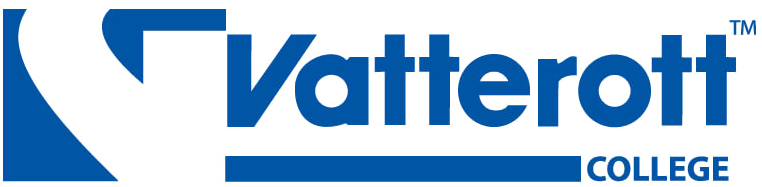
- Type: Private for-profit college
- Active: 1969–2018
- Owner: Vatterott Educational Centers, Inc. (TA Associates)
- Location: St. Louis (main campus), Missouri, United States

Vatterott College was a for-profit career training institute with programs at 16 campuses across the Midwest of the United States and online. It was operated by Vatterott Educational Centers, Inc., which was based in St. Louis and owned by the private equity firm TA Associates. The college also offered distance-learning programs, called eCompanion Courses, which allowed students to earn credits, diplomas, and degrees through online classes.

Vatterott College closed all campuses on December 17, 2018 citing a U.S. Department of Education decision to place it under heightened cash monitoring.

== History ==
John C. Vatterott Sr. and Phil Sullivan opened Urban Technical Centers, Inc. in 1969 in St. Louis, Missouri. In the 1970s, the institution was renamed Vatterott & Sullivan Educational Center.

In 1984, Vatterott and Sullivan agreed to split the company. Sullivan moved to Kansas City, and Vatterott took full control of the college, which was then renamed Vatterott College. In January 1985, a Vatterott College campus opened in St. Ann, Missouri.

In 1989, the college's associate degree (specialized) granting authority was issued by the Accrediting Commission of Career Schools and Colleges (ACCSC), now known as the Accrediting Commission of National Association of Trade and Technical Schools (NATTS).

In April 1991, Vatterott College expanded to the Missouri cities of Springfield, Joplin, and Independence as a result of a teach-out of students attending the former Draughon Business College, and became authorized to establish branch campuses at those locations in August. In May 1995, Vatterott College expanded to Quincy, Illinois, as a result of the acquisition of the former Quincy Technical Schools.

In June 1996, Vatterott College entered into a teach-out agreement with the Business and Banking Institute, which operated locations in Omaha, Nebraska, Des Moines, and Iowa. Programs were added and the institutions were renamed Vatterott College. The same year, an additional location of the St. Ann campus opened in Sunset Hills, Missouri. Vatterott College expanded into the following cities as a result of various teach-out agreements: St. Joseph, Missouri, in March 1995 (formerly known as the Northwest Missouri Community College); Tulsa, Oklahoma, in 1997; Memphis, Tennessee, in 1999; Wichita, Kansas, in 1999; and Cleveland, Ohio in 2001. In 1997, a location was opened in Oklahoma City.

In 1998, Vatterott became the first private career college in St. Louis to offer classes online through its division Vatterott Global Online.

In December 1999, Vatterott College expanded to Omaha, Nebraska by acquiring the former Universal Technology Institute. In January 2000, a campus was established in O’Fallon, Missouri. In September 2001, Vatterott College purchased the former Omaha College of Health Careers in Omaha, Nebraska, and converted it into a Vatterott College campus.

In January 2003, Vatterott College was purchased by Wellspring Capital Management for $50 million, resulting in the formation of a holding company, Vatterott Educational Centers, Inc.

In 2004, Vatterott Educational Centers opened L'Ecole Culinaire, a culinary school located in St. Louis. In 2004, Vatterott acquired the Court Reporting Institute of Dallas and the Court Reporting Institute of Houston and converted them into Vatterott Colleges, marking Vatterott's expansion to Texas. These two campuses were permanently closed in 2015.

In January 2007, Vatterott Education Center located in Dallas, Texas was approved as a branch campus of the Quincy main institution and has been closed since 2014. The Vatterott Career College, Appling Farms location in Memphis was opened in April 2008. In November 2008, a L’École Culinaire campus was opened in Cordova, Tennessee. In August 2009, a Vatterott College campus opened in Fairview Heights, Illinois with seven diploma programs.

In September 2009, TA Associates acquired Vatterott Educational Centers, Inc. from WellSpring Capital Partners. The O’Fallon, Missouri, location relocated in the fall of 2010 to a renovated building in St. Charles, Missouri. The Court Reporting Institute opened a campus in Arlington, Virginia, in December 2011 and was closed within one year after opening.

"ex’Treme Institute by Nelly", a music recording and production school, was opened in St. Louis, Missouri in December 2011.

=== Lawsuits, investigations, and criticism ===
In 2009, three executives of Vatterott College were convicted of conspiring to obtain federal student grants and loans for students who were not eligible by providing false information and documents.

In 2014, the college was sued by a student who claimed that she was misled that her credits from the college would be transferable toward a nursing certificate. The plaintiff was awarded $27,676 ($38,252 in 2025) in actual damages and about $2 million ($2.76 million in 2025) in punitive damages because the state of Missouri law caps these awards.

In January 2017, Brian Carroll, president of the college's Kansas City campus for the previous five years, was fired by the school because he allowed a homeless student to sleep in the library on a night where temperatures fell to −4 °F (−20 °C)

In 2017, forty programs at Vatterott failed the first test of the Obama Administration's gainful employment rule. Since then, Vatterott College filed for receivership and attempted to seek a buyer for its campuses.

On January 4, 2018, Education Corporation of America announced that it would acquire select campuses from Vatterott, but the sale did not go through due to the restrictions on Vatterott's participation in the federal financial aid programs being significantly increased by the U.S. Department of Education.

In October 2018, the Quincy, Des Moines, Wichita, Cleveland, and Oklahoma City campuses were permanently closed. The closures of these campuses were announced on January 9 following Vatterott's attempted acquisition by Education Corporation of America, and at the same time, the campuses ceased enrollment to new students. On December 5, 2018, the college's accreditation by the Accrediting Commission of Career Schools and Colleges was revoked.

On December 17, 2018, Vatterott College closed its remaining campuses.

As of August 2021, Vatterott still owes the U.S. Department of Education $244 million ($290 million in 2025).

== Locations ==
At the time of the college's shuttering in December 2018, Vatterott College operated facilities in the following US cities:

- Illinois: Fairview Heights
- Missouri: Joplin, Kansas City, St. Louis, Springfield, St. Charles, St. Joseph, Berkeley, Sunset Hills
- Oklahoma: Tulsa
- Tennessee: Memphis
