= Mike Affarano Motorsports =

NASCAR team

- Owner: Mike Affarano
- Series: NASCAR Camping World Truck Series; ARCA Menards Series
- Race drivers: TBA. TBA
- Manufacturer: Chevrolet
- Opened: 2012 (ARCA); 2014 (Truck)

Career
- Debut: ARCA Menards Series: 2012 International Motorsports Hall of Fame 200 (Talladega); NASCAR Truck Series: 2014 1-800-CarCash Mudsummer Classic (Eldora)
- Races competed: 8
- Drivers' Championships: 0
- Race victories: 0
- Pole positions: 0

Mike Affarano Motorsports with Roger Carter is an American professional stock car racing team that formerly competed in the NASCAR Camping World Truck Series, fielding the No. 03 Chevrolet Silverado for Tim Viens, and previously with Jake Griffin, John Provenzano, and team owner Mike Affarano. The team has also competed in the ARCA Menards Series and the NASCAR Xfinity Series in the past. They also field a Pro Cup Series team for Emily Cook and in go-karts with Affarano's twin sons Kyle and Zach.

== History ==
After making his first attempt in ARCA in 2012 at the season opener at Daytona driving the No. 59 for Mark Gibson (which was a DNQ), Affarano began fielding his team in the series starting at Talladega. In his first race as an owner-driver, he immediately became known for his infamous crash in that race where his No. 83 flipped on lap 76 of the race in arguably one of the most dangerous crashes in ARCA history. Since the car landed on its roof, a safety truck had to flip it back on its wheels. Affarano proceeded to climb out of his car with the help of safety personnel at the scene.

Affarano drove in four more races that year, two for his team (and the other two driving the No. 18 for Fast Track Racing).

The team's first truck start came at Eldora in 2014, with Affarano himself driving. The team used the No. 03 and was a Chevrolet. Affarano made the field by qualifying via his finish in his heat race. However, he ended up finishing last in the race itself. He made three more starts that year at Chicago, Bristol (which was a DNQ), and Talladega.

On January 28, 2015, it was announced that the team would expand into the NASCAR Xfinity Series for the first time, with Johanna Long, who was without a ride in 2014, joining Affarano's team to drive the No. 03 Chevrolet Camaro. However, the team had to cancel their plans of running Daytona due to lack of sponsorship, which continued for months. By spring, the team was finally able to attempt a race, Richmond, which turned out to be their only attempt of the season. Long and the team did not qualify. It was confirmed on May 21 that Long had left the team. She would eventually join Obaika Racing.

On the truck side, Affarano returned in 2015, again for a part-time schedule. Affarano himself drove at Kansas, Texas, Gateway, and Iowa. He also withdrew from two other races that year at Dover and Kentucky. He did enter his truck at Eldora for the second year in a row, but this time, it was with Jake Griffin driving. It was the first time he had someone other than himself driving his truck. After that, Tim Viens attempted Pocono and Michigan for the team, but failed to qualify for both races. Additionally, Viens and Affarano withdrew from the race at Chicago, Affarano's home track.

Affarano and his No. 03 team did not attempt any races in 2016, but they did attempt to come back in 2017 at Talladega. They were initially on the entry list, but the team withdrew after they could not get the truck ready and updated in time, according to a post on the team's Facebook page.

In 2018, the team tried to attempt Chicago with Affarano driving, but they withdrew. However, they were able to make it to another race that year, Eldora, with dirt driver John Provenzano attempting to qualify but failing to do so.

It was announced on July 2, 2019, that Jake Griffin would return to the team for Eldora, which again ended up being the team's only attempt that year. Griffin qualified for the race and finished 26th.

On February 13, 2020, the team was unable to make the Daytona race after its truck and trailer skidded off the road on its way to the track. After failing to qualify for Charlotte and Atlanta, Mike Affarano Motorsports and Tim Viens were supposed to run at Homestead-Miami but the truck failed pre-race inspection and NASCAR forced them to withdraw since the repairs could not be made at the track. The truck failed inspection because the seat was mounted too low, and they couldn't fix it due to where the railing was installed. The truck also had the incorrect splitter, but with no way to fix the seat, there was no point in trying to buy a new one. After that incident, Viens and Mike Affarano Motorsports parted ways.

Prior to the 2026 NASCAR Craftsman Truck Series season, NASCAR revealed that Affarano's team had created a new owner's points slot for their No. 03 truck. The team did not end up entering any races.

=== Truck No. 03 results ===
Year	Driver	No.	Make	1	2	3	4	5	6	7	8	9	10	11	12	13	14	15	16	17	18	19	20	21	22	23	NCWTC	Pts
2014	Mike Affarano	03	Chevy	DAY	MAR	KAN	CLT	DOV	TEX	GTW	KEN	IOW	ELD; 30	POC	MCH	BRI; DNQ	MSP	CHI; 24	NHA	LVS	TAL; 24	MAR	TEX	PHO	HOM		58th	21
2015	Mike Affarano	03	Chevy	DAY	ATL	MAR	KAN; 31	CLT	DOV; Wth	TEX; 29	GTW; 30	IOW; 30	KEN; Wth														56th	14
2015	Jake Griffin	03	Chevy											ELD; DNQ													56th	14
2015	Tim Viens	03	Chevy												POC; DNQ	MCH; DNQ	BRI	MSP	CHI; Wth	NHA	LVS	TAL	MAR	TEX	PHO	HOM	56th	14
2017	Mike Affarano	03	Chevy	DAY	ATL	MAR	KAN	CLT	DOV	TEX	GTW	IOW	KEN	ELD	POC	MCH	BRI	MSP	CHI	NHA	LVS	TAL; Wth	MAR	TEX	PHO	HOM	56th	0
2018	Mike Affarano	03	Chevy	DAY	ATL	LVS	MAR	DOV	KAN	CLT	TEX	IOW	GTW	CHI; Wth	KEN												56th	0
2018	John Provenzano	03	Chevy													ELD; DNQ	POC	MCH	BRI	MSP	LVS	TAL	MAR	TEX	PHO	HOM	56th	0
2019	Jake Griffin	03	Chevy	DAY	ATL	LVS	MAR	TEX	DOV	KAN	CLT	TEX	IOW	GTW	CHI	KEN	POC	ELD; 26	MCH	BRI	MSP	LVS	TAL	MAR	PHO	HOM	56th	11
2020	Tim Viens	03	Chevy	DAY; Wth	LVS	CLT; DNQ	ATL; DNQ	HOM; Wth	POC	KEN	TEX	KAN	KAN	MCH	DRC	DOV	GTW	DAR	RCH	BRI	LVS	TAL	KAN	TEX	MAR	PHO	48th	0
