= Mike Affarano =

American racing driver (born 1962)

- Born: Michael Affarano; June 9, 1962 (age 64); Shorewood, Illinois, U.S.

NASCAR FedEx Freight Truck Series career
- 7 races run over 4 years
- Best finish: 75th (2014)
- First race: 2014 1-800-CarCash Mudsummer Classic (Eldora)
- Last race: 2015 American Ethanol 200 Presented by Enogen (Iowa)
Wins	Top tens	Poles
0	0	0
- Statistics up to date as of December 21, 2019.

Michael Affarano (born June 9, 1962) is an American professional stock car racing driver and race team owner. As a driver, he last competed part-time in the NASCAR Gander RV & Outdoors Truck Series for his own team, Mike Affarano Motorsports. He has also competed and fielded a team in the ARCA Racing Series.

== Racing career ==
=== ARCA Menards Series and 2012 Talladega crash ===
Affarano made his first attempt in ARCA in 2012 at the season opener at Daytona driving the No. 59 for Mark Gibson, but he did not qualify for the race. He began fielding his own team in the series starting at Talladega. In his first race as an owner-driver, he became known for a crash in that race where his No. 83 flipped on lap 76 of the race. Since the car landed on its roof, a safety truck had to flip it back on its wheels, where Affarano proceeded to climb out of his car with the help of safety personnel at the scene.

Affarano drove in four more races that year, with two being for his own team and the other two driving the No. 18 for Fast Track Racing.

Affarano nor his team did not end up making up any starts in 2013, however, plans were announced for him to drive the No. 40 Dodge for Carter 2 Motorsports at Chicago, but Dominick Casola ended up driving the car instead. Casola originally had been announced to be in the other C2M car, the No. 97, which was driven by Nick Tucker instead.

He returned with his own team, now using the No. 03, for two attempts in 2014. The first was a withdrawal at his home track of Chicago, and the second being at Pocono where he surprisingly finished 14th in a field of 31 cars.

In 2015, Affarano did not drive in any races himself, but he did have Raymond Hassler in the No. 03 at Daytona and Kevin Rutherford in the car for three races at Nashville, Toledo, and Winchester.

=== NASCAR Gander RV & Outdoors Truck Series ===
Affarano's first truck start came at the 2014 Eldora race. He fielded his own truck, the No. 03 Chevrolet, and qualified into the event through his heat race. However, in the race, Affarano finished last. He made three more starts that year at Chicago, Bristol (which was a DNQ), and Talladega.

He returned in 2015, again for a part-time schedule. Affarano himself drove at Kansas, Texas, Gateway, and Iowa. He also withdrew from two other races that year at Dover and Kentucky. He did enter his truck at Eldora for the second year in a row, but this time, it was with Jake Griffin driving. It was the first time he had someone other than himself driving his truck. After that Tim Viens attempted Pocono and Michigan for the team but failed to qualify in both. After that Viens and Affarano Motorsports were supposedly to attempt Chicago's race but withdrew.

Affarano and his No. 03 team did not attempt any races in 2016, but they did attempt to come back in 2017 at Talladega. They were initially on the entry list, but the team withdrew after they could not get the truck ready and updated in time, according to a post on the team's Facebook page.

He also withdrew from the race at Chicago in 2018. John Provenzano attempted Eldora's race for the team but failed to qualify.

In 2019, Jake Griffin returned to the team for Eldora's race and finished 26th.

=== NASCAR Xfinity Series ===
In 2015, Affarano expanded his race team into the NASCAR Xfinity Series, attempting one race with Johanna Long in his No. 03 car, but failed to qualify. After that, Long parted ways with the team. Affarano did not run any Xfinity races as a driver, though.

The team was planning to debut at the season-opener at Daytona in February 2015, but they had to postpone their debut due to lack of sponsorship. Affarano started his Xfinity team by purchasing cars and equipment from the closed Turner Scott Motorsports team.

== Personal life ==
Affarano lives in Shorewood, Illinois where he owns an auto parts shop. He is happily married for many years. He lost his 16-year old son, named after him, in May 2005. He also has two other children, twin boys, (born 2007), who are also into racing.

== Motorsports career results ==
=== NASCAR ===
==== Camping World Truck Series ====
NASCAR Camping World Truck Series results
Year	Team	No.	Make	1	2	3	4	5	6	7	8	9	10	11	12	13	14	15	16	17	18	19	20	21	22	23	NCWTC	Pts	Ref
2014	Mike Affarano Motorsports	03	Chevy	DAY	MAR	KAN	CLT	DOV	TEX	GTW	KEN	IOW	ELD; 30	POC	MCH	BRI; DNQ	MSP	CHI; 24	NHA	LVS	TAL; 24	MAR	TEX	PHO	HOM		75th	21	
2015	Mike Affarano Motorsports	03	Chevy	DAY	ATL	MAR	KAN; 31	CLT	DOV	TEX; 29	GTW; 30	IOW; 30	KEN	ELD	POC	MCH	BRI	MSP	CHI	NHA	LVS	TAL	MAR	TEX	PHO	HOM	103rd	0^{1}	

^{*} Season still in progress
^{1} Ineligible for series points

=== ARCA Racing Series ===
ARCA Racing Series results
Year	Team	No.	Make	1	2	3	4	5	6	7	8	9	10	11	12	13	14	15	16	17	18	19	20	ARSC	Pts	Ref
2012	Mark Gibson Racing	59	Chevy	DAY; DNQ	MOB	SLM																		44th	465	
2012	Mike Affarano Motorsports	83	Chevy				TAL; 29	TOL	ELK	POC	MCH	WIN	NJE		CHI; 23	IRP	POC	BLN	ISF; 16	MAD	SLM	DSF		44th	465	
2012	Fast Track Racing	18	Ford											IOW; 39										44th	465	
2012	Fast Track Racing	18	Dodge																				KAN; 35	44th	465	
2014	Mike Affarano Motorsports	03	Chevy	DAY	MOB	SLM	TAL	TOL	NJE	POC	MCH	ELK	WIN	CHI	IRP	POC; 14	BLN	ISF	MAD	DSF	SLM	KEN	KAN	95th	160	
