= Zaxby's =

American chain of fast casual restaurants

Zaxbys

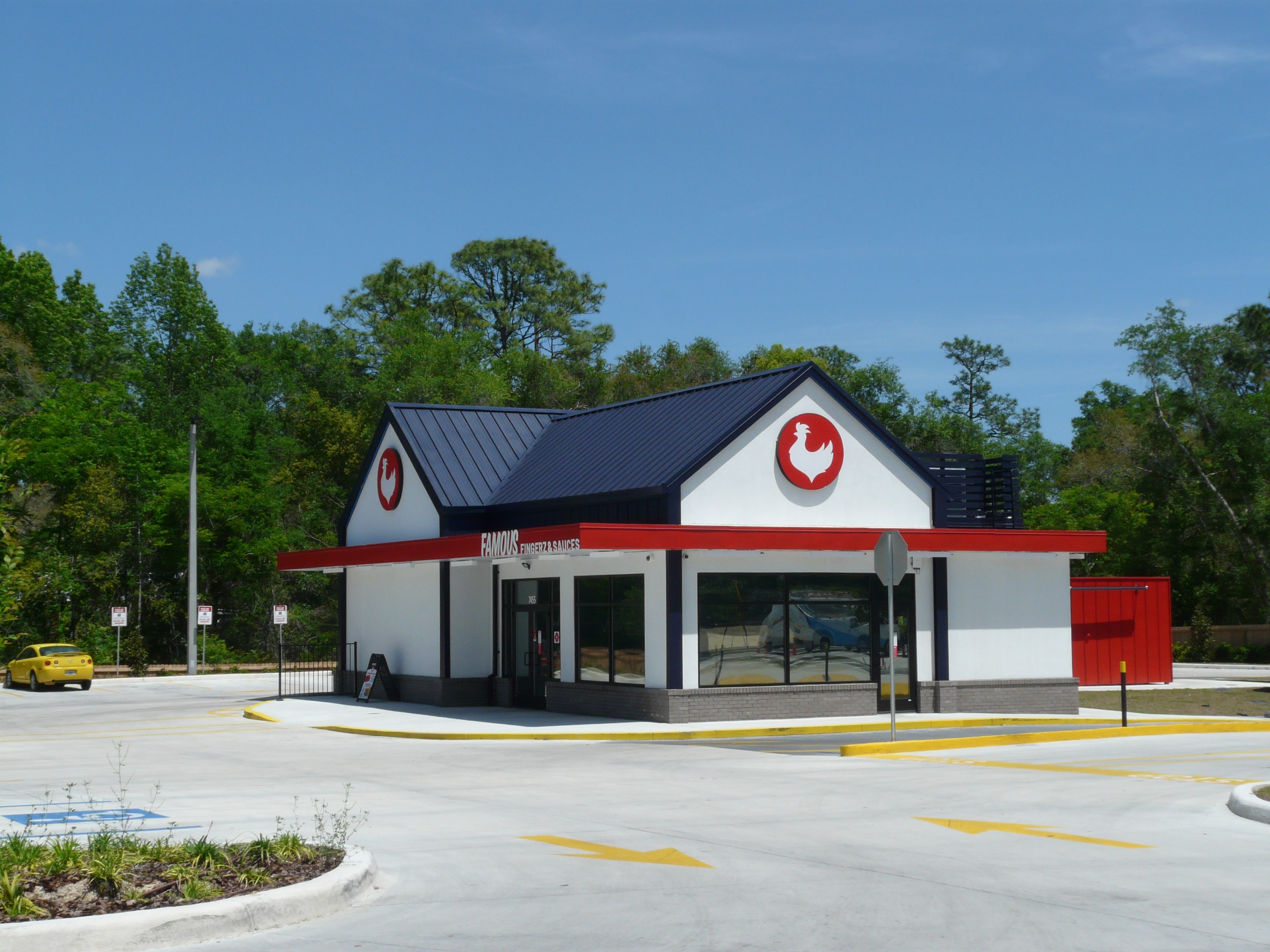
- Zaxbys in Keystone Heights, Florida
- Trade name: Zaxbys
- Formerly: Zax (1990–1994); Zaxby's (1994–2024)
- Type: Private
- Industry: Restaurants
- Genre: Fast casual
- Founded: March 1990; 36 years ago
- Founders: Zach McLeroy; Tony Townley
- Headquarters: Atlanta, Georgia, U.S.
- Number of locations: 941 (2022)
- Area served: United States
- Key people: Bernard Acoca (CEO); Zach McLeroy (Chairman, Former CEO, Co-Founder); Tony Townley (Former Chief Strategy Officer, Co-Founder)
- Products: Chicken Fingers, french fries, Texas toast, 12 Signature Sauces
- Website: www.zaxbys.com

Zaxby's SPE Franchisor LLC, doing business as Zaxbys (formerly known as Zax and Zaxby's), is an American chain of fast casual restaurants offering chicken fingers, sandwiches, chicken wings, appetizers, and salads. The chain operates primarily in the Southern United States and has more than 900 locations. Most Zaxbys restaurants are owned and operated through franchising.

== History and locations ==
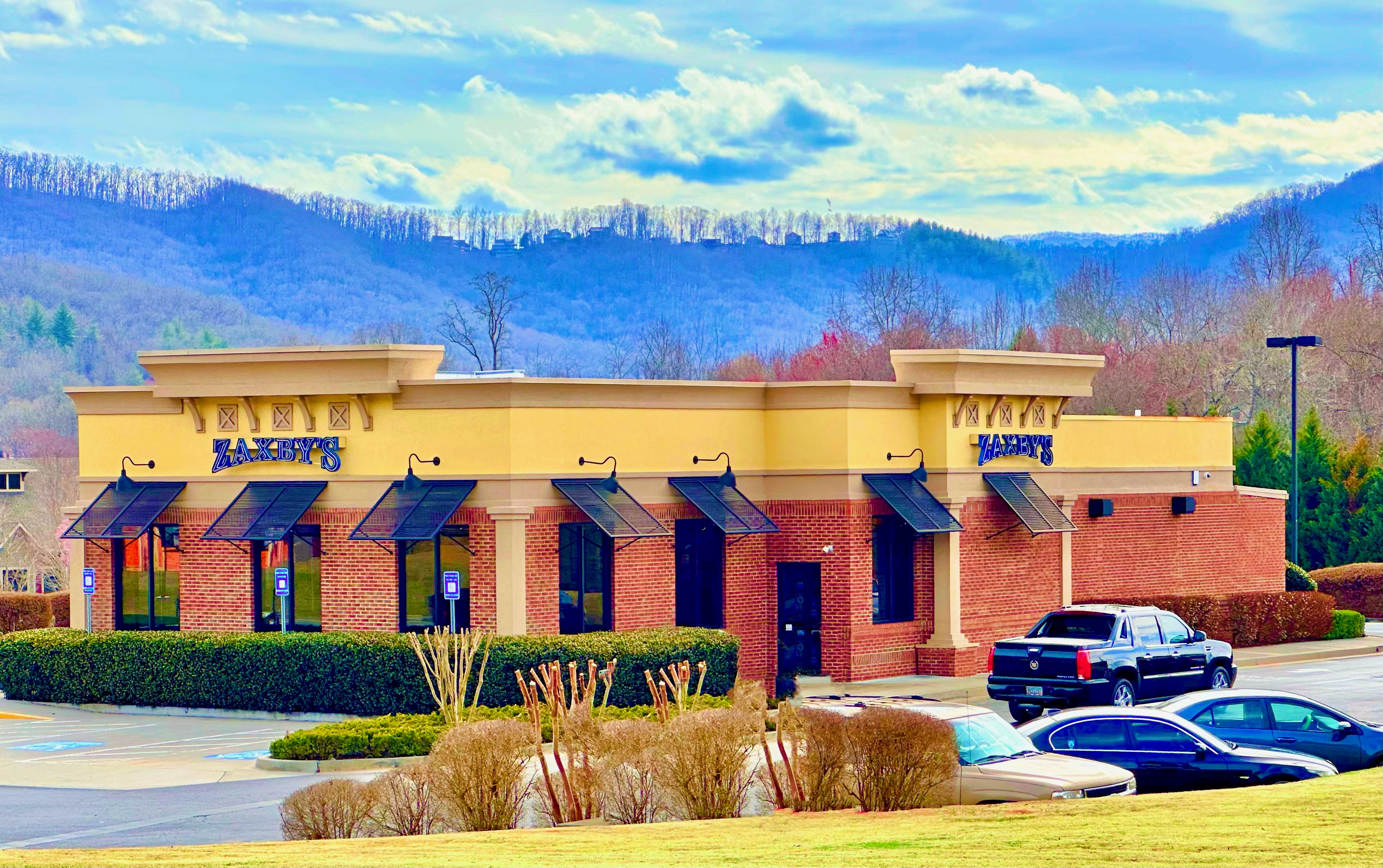
Zaxbys in Hiawassee, Georgia

The first Zaxbys was established in Statesboro, Georgia, in March 1990, near the Georgia Southern University campus, by childhood friends Zach McLeroy and Tony Townley; the first restaurant was known as "Zax" before becoming Zaxby's.

The company's first restaurant outside of Georgia was opened in September 1994 in Bowling Green, Kentucky. In 2013, they opened locations in Utah, the first expansion outside of the southeastern United States.

In 2022, Zaxbys appointed Bernard Acoca as its first non-founder CEO. Zach McLeroy remained as chairman, while Tony Townley exited the company following its acquisition by Goldman Sachs in November 2020.

In 2024, Zaxbys announced expansion plans for 2025, including a store in Cambridge, Maryland, the first location in the state. More locations are slated to open along the Eastern Shore of Maryland in the coming years. As of 2025, Zaxbys had more than 970 locations throughout the U.S.

== Menu and themes ==
Zaxbys is a fast casual restaurant offering Chicken Fingerz, chicken wings, fried shrimp, sandwiches, and salads. Dipping sauces are offered with chicken finger orders, and range from mild, to the moderate "Zax Sauce", to the intensely hot "Nuclear". Dining rooms at Zaxbys restaurants are decorated with assorted whimsical objects and signs, which often vary in theme by location and region. Some locations in college towns feature objects and decorations related to the local university. Similarly, citrus-industry themed decorations line the walls at a location in Orlando, Florida.

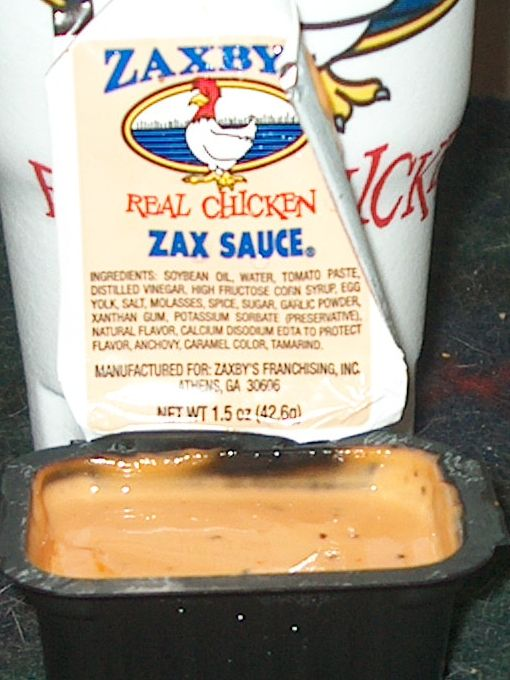
Zax sauce

Since the December 2013 announcement that Zaxbys would begin to offer the Coca-Cola Freestyle machine at their locations, the decor in the fountain drink dispensing area has been dominated by that distinctive dispenser and other Coca-Cola branding.

The company reintroduced milkshakes to its menu in 2025.

== Products ==
Zaxbys sells three sauces at Walmart, Winn-Dixie and Amazon as of July 2024.

The company offers an app-based points-for-dollars loyalty program called Zax Rewardz.

== Advertising ==
In October 2008, the video game Midnight Club: Los Angeles featured Zaxbys as a restaurant on the streets of Los Angeles. California, notably, is not home to any Zaxbys locations.

In 2025, Zaxbys featured actor Omar Epps as The Sauce Boss to promote the chain's signature sauces.

== Sponsorships ==
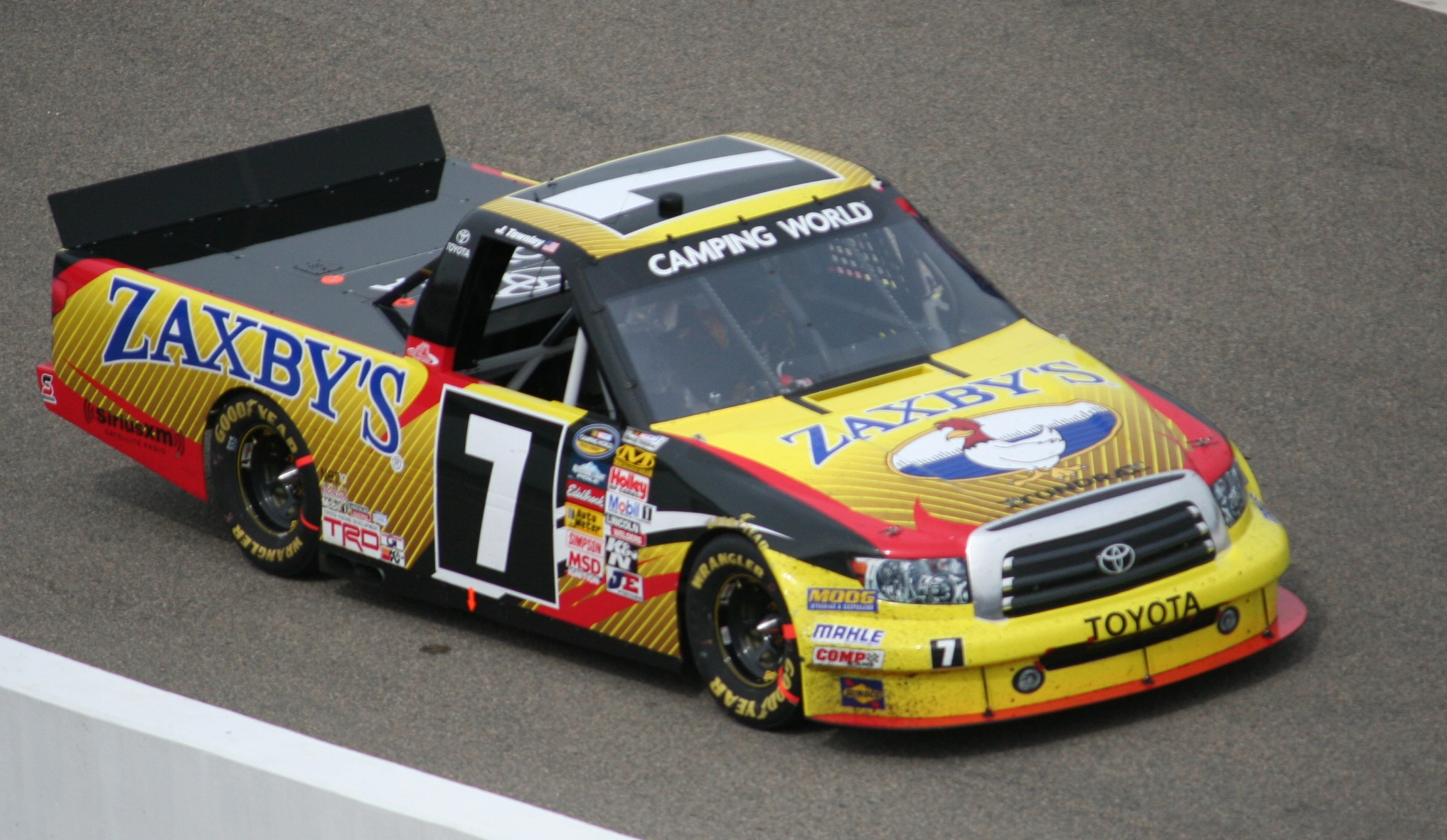
John Wes Townley's Zaxby's NASCAR Camping World Truck Series truck in 2013

Zaxbys is "The Official Chicken of Sports Fanz" and has collective intellectual property rights at nearly 30 Division I colleges through 2015 through a deal with their football and basketball teams. The sponsorship, which was made through IMG College, includes 25 states, seven conferences, and the entire area of Zaxby's locations. Included are ten colleges from the Southeastern Conference, six colleges from the Atlantic Coast Conference, three colleges from Conference USA, two each from the Big Ten Conference and Sun Belt Conference, and one college from the Big 12 Conference. Additionally, Zaxbys has a separate agreement with Clemson University to provide brand presence at all football and men's and women's basketball games.

Zaxbys was also the sponsor of the Heart of Dallas Bowl, played at the Cotton Bowl Stadium.

Zaxbys was a sponsor for Joey Clanton in the No. 09 JTG Daugherty Racing truck in the NASCAR Truck Series. Zaxbys also sponsored the late John Wes Townley (son of co-founder Tony) in NASCAR's Truck Series and Xfinity Series, and Townley's Athenian Motorsports. John Wes retired from competition after 2016, thus ending the sponsorship.

Zaxbys is a supporter of Make-A-Wish.

== See also ==
- List of chicken restaurants
