= Tilted Kilt Pub & Eatery =

Celtic-themed sports bar and restaurant chain in the United States

Tilted Kilt
- Type: Private
- Industry: Restaurant
- Founded: Las Vegas, Nevada, U.S. (2003)
- Founders: Mark DiMartino; John Reynaud; Shannon Reilly
- Headquarters: Tempe, Arizona, U.S.
- Number of locations: 6
- Area served: United States
- Products: Pub food, American food, alcohol, 24+Draft and bottled beers
- Services: Food and beverage
- Number of employees: over 2,500
- Parent: Arc Group Inc
- Website: tiltedkilt.com

Tilted Kilt Pub and Eatery is a modern Scottish-Irish-themed sports pub and franchisor-type restaurant chain in the United States.

The company has six locations.

== History ==
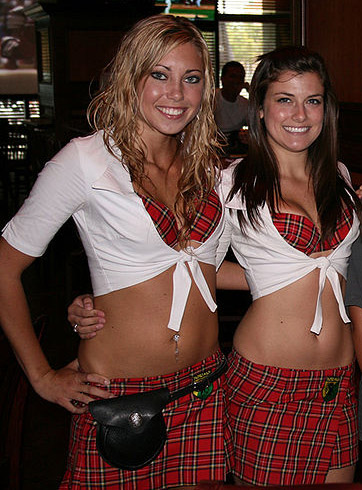
Servers in typical attire before the 2015 uniform update (2008)

The first Tilted Kilt Pub & Eatery was opened in the Las Vegas Rio Hotel and Casino in 2003, with servers "wearing Celtic-themed uniforms with knee-high socks and short, sexy plaid kilts", by restaurateur Mark DiMartino and business partners and co-founders Shannon Reilly and John Reynaud. The concept was a "contemporary, Celtic-themed sports Pub staffed with beautiful servers".

== Atmosphere ==
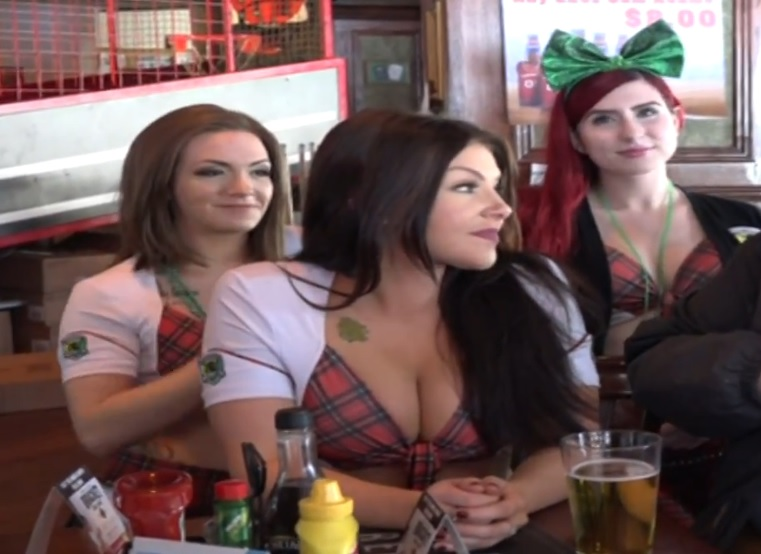
Waitresses wearing post-2015 uniforms (2018)

Tilted Kilt describes itself as "a modern American, Scottish and Irish sports pub". The menu mixes traditional and contemporary pub food, serving fish and chips, shepherd's pie, and "Big-Arse Burgers". Each pub features at least 24 beers on tap, including flagship beverages such as Guinness and Samuel Adams. The establishments are filled with televisions for sporting events, and games such as Golden Tee, pool, and darts are available for the patrons.

Others place Tilted Kilt into the category of "breastaurant", in the same vein as Hooters and Twin Peaks, specializing in scantily clad female servers. The company's homepage heavily features so-called "Kilt Girls". Community members in Evanston, Illinois, mounted a successful campaign to keep the chain from opening there.

== Undercover Boss ==
Tilted Kilt's president, Ron Lynch was featured on season 4, episode 2, of Undercover Boss, released on CBS, November 9, 2012, in the United States.

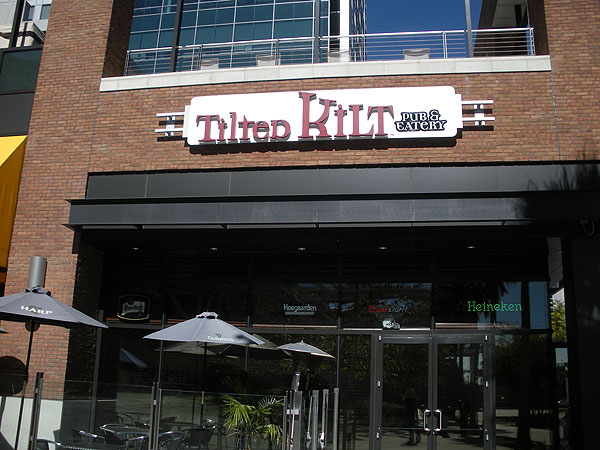
Facade of a Tilted Kilt adjacent to Petco Park, San Diego. This location closed in 2017.

== Litigation ==
In April 2019, a jury in Lancaster County, Nebraska, awarded $1.47 million to a past waitress against Famous Brands Group LLC, a Tilted Kilt franchisee and a manager, Dustin Lindgren, for video recording servers changing in the dressing room. The restaurant closed in 2014, the year the recordings took place. This was not the first time the manager was confronted in a separate incident by a different employee. In 2015, the former manager Lindgren was convicted of a felony charge; he received 180 days (approximately six months) in jail and five years' probation "for recording a person in a state of undress". Two other lawsuits were settled for an undisclosed amount with two other victims for the same conduct; one was set to go to trial on Thursday, April 18, 2019.

== Sale ==
In 2018, SDA Holdings sold Tilted Kilt to Arc Group Inc., owner of Dick's Wings and Grill, for 1.4 million shares of stock, $10 cash and payments in the future totaling $1.5 million. CEO of ARC Group Richard Akam, said, "Tilted Kilt will be a strong addition to our platform and a brand for which we believe we can make a significant impact in its top and bottom line growth". The former president of Tilted Kilt, Ron Lynch has opened a new restaurant in Tempe, Arizona, called VooDoo Daddy's Steam Kitchen, a Louisiana-style fast-casual restaurant.
