= Korbin Forrister =

American racing driver (born 1992)

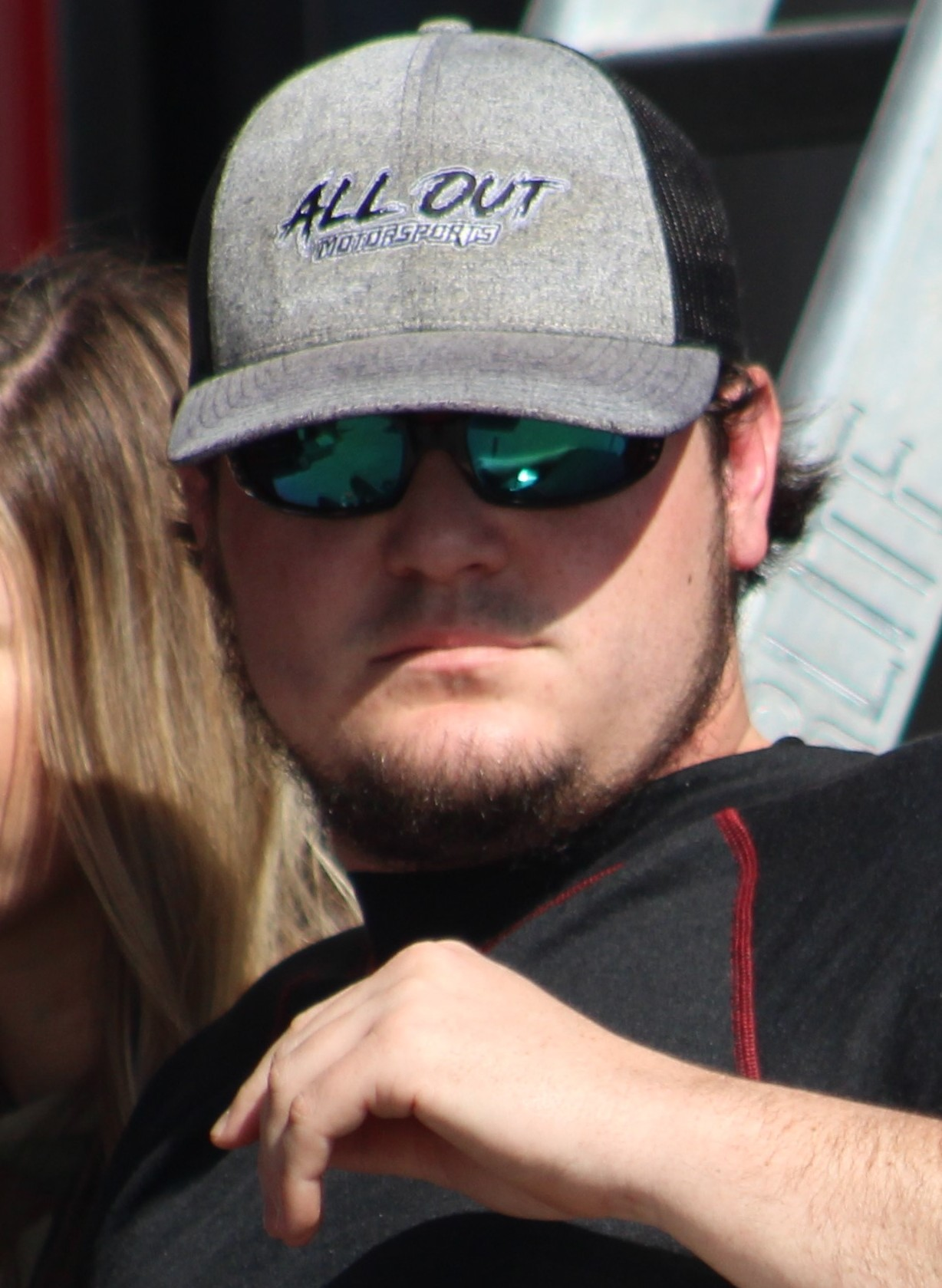
- Forrister at Daytona International Speedway in 2019
- Born: Robert Korbin Forrister; November 16, 1992 (age 33); Cedartown, Georgia, U.S.

NASCAR O'Reilly Auto Parts Series career
- 6 races run over 3 years
- 2020 position: 85th
- Best finish: 85th (2020)
- First race: 2015 Kansas Lottery 300 (Kansas)
- Last race: 2020 Drydene 200 (Dover)
Wins	Top tens	Poles
0	0	0

NASCAR FedEx Freight Truck Series career
- 57 races run over 7 years
- 2020 position: 45th
- Best finish: 18th (2015)
- First race: 2014 Kroger 250 (Martinsville)
- Last race: 2020 Chevrolet Silverado 250 (Talladega)
Wins	Top tens	Poles
0	0	0
- Statistics up to date as of November 11, 2020.

Robert Korbin Forrister (born November 16, 1992) is an American former professional stock car racing driver. He last competed part-time in the NASCAR Gander RV & Outdoors Truck Series, driving the Nos. 7 and 17 Toyota Tundras for All Out Motorsports.

== Racing career ==
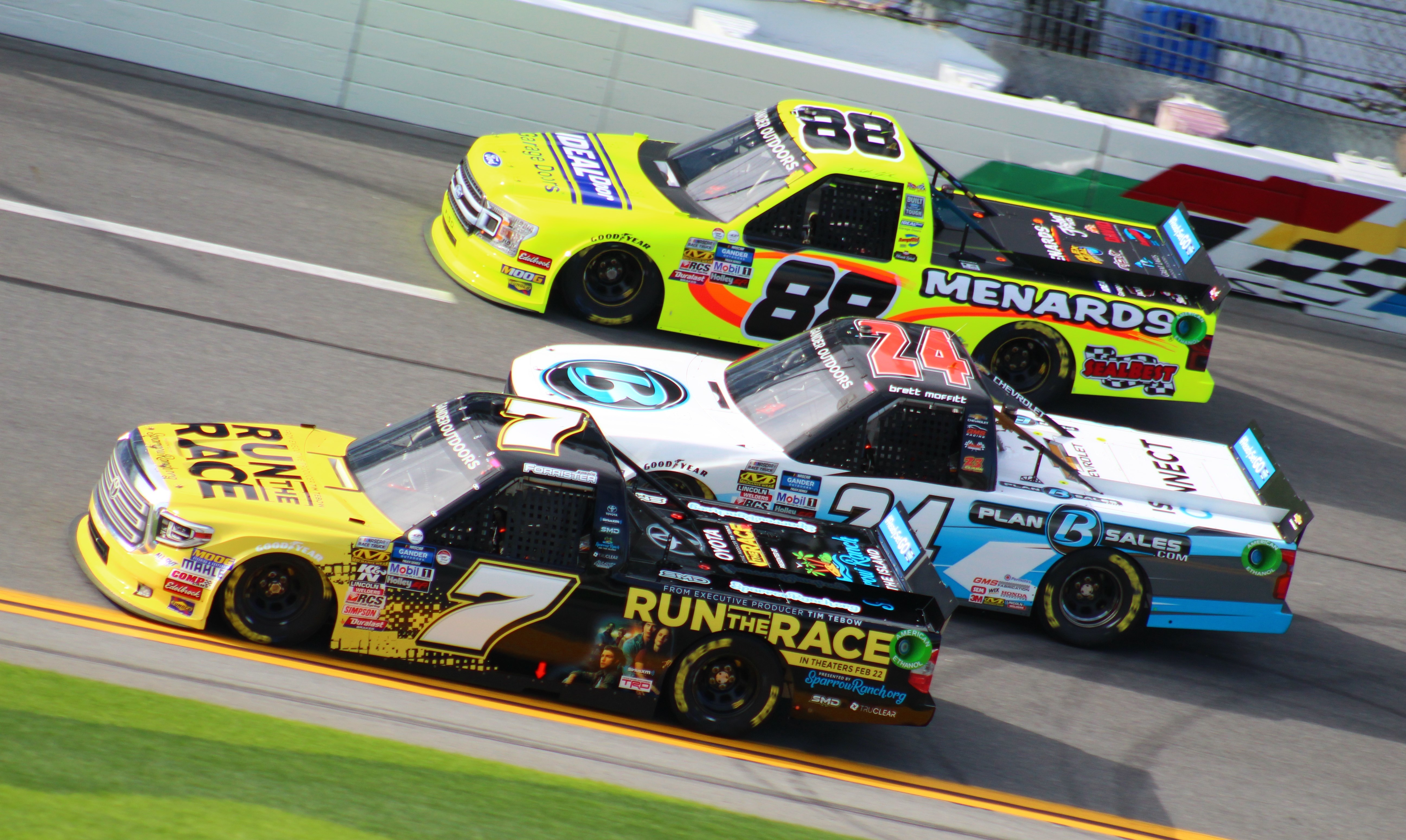
Forrister racing against Matt Crafton (No. 88) and Brett Moffitt (No. 24) at Daytona in 2019.

Forrister first started in dirt track racing, winning a track championship when he was nine. He also played baseball while in high school, but decided to pursue a full-time racing career upon graduating.

In 2012, Forrister attempted to make his stock car debut at Mobile International Speedway in the ARCA Racing Series for Lafferty Motorsports, but failed to qualify. He later made his debut at Toledo Speedway, driving the No. 68 for Kimmel Racing. After starting 27th, he finished 28th after suffering from clutch problems on lap 119. He attempted a total of nine races in 2012, only finishing once at Kansas Speedway. The following year, he ran four races, with a best finish of 14th at Mobile.

In 2014, Forrister made his Camping World Truck Series debut at Martinsville Speedway; after starting 34th, he finished 26th, 14 laps behind race winner Matt Crafton. He had a best finish of 15th at Phoenix International Speedway during the season. The following year, he joined SS-Green Light Racing to compete in 15 races. At Eldora Speedway, he began running a Donald Trump-based paint scheme to support Trump's 2016 presidential campaign, although the campaign was not sponsoring Forrister's team. During the race, Forrister struggled, spinning three times on laps 8, 27 and 149; he finished the race 24th, one lap down. Later in the year, he debuted in the Xfinity Series for SS-Green Light at Kansas Speedway, but crashed with Jennifer Jo Cobb and finished 31st. He made another Xfinity start at Phoenix, driving the No. 15 for Rick Ware Racing, and finished 32nd.

In 2016, Forrister joined Lira Motorsports to drive the No. 59 car at the Truck Series season opener in Daytona and Atlanta, along with running the ARCA race at Talladega Superspeedway. Forrister failed to qualify for the first two races in the Truck Series, but started 10th in the Talladega race and finished 27th at Talladega after The Big One.

On February 22, 2017, Forrister announced a full-season deal with Wauters Motorsports, piloting the No. 5. However, after Atlanta, the team shut down. He was later picked up by his former Truck Series team, SS-Green Light Racing, to run at Michigan and Daytona in the Xfinity Series. Forrister would run the No. 07 normally driven by Ray Black Jr. at Michigan, and the No. 99 normally driven by David Starr at Daytona. However, Forrister was out with the flu at Daytona and Starr ended up driving (Starr finished 5th).

For 2018, Forrister announced he would open up his own team in the Truck Series called All Out Motorsports. He would attempt 11 races on the schedule but failed to qualify for Charlotte due to a qualifying rainout. On July 12, Forrister earned his second-best finish of his career in the Truck Series with a 13th at Kentucky Speedway. He matched that with another 13th at Las Vegas later that year, and then again at Talladega in October 2019.

Forrister's team intended to run full-time in 2019, but plans were eventually scaled back starting with their withdrawal from the race at Kansas in May. After they returned for the next race at Charlotte, the team's crew chief, Wally Rogers, tweeted that the team had shut down. However, days later, Forrister himself rebuked those claims, but Rogers still left the team to go to Jordan Anderson Racing. All Out did not attempt any other races until Talladega in October 2019, where Forrister finished 13th and had a new crew chief in Danny Gill.

Forrister attempted 10 races in 2020, with Nursing Home Heroes and Nursing Home Caregivers sponsoring most races; he failed to qualify at Las Vegas Motor Speedway and withdrew at Kansas Speedway. He had a best finish of eighteenth at Daytona International Speedway and two DNFs.

After not attempting the 2021 season opener at Daytona, Forrister has not raced since.

== Motorsports career results ==
=== NASCAR ===
(key) (Bold – Pole position awarded by qualifying time. Italics – Pole position earned by points standings or practice time. * – Most laps led.)

==== Xfinity Series ====
NASCAR Xfinity Series results
Year	Team	No.	Make	1	2	3	4	5	6	7	8	9	10	11	12	13	14	15	16	17	18	19	20	21	22	23	24	25	26	27	28	29	30	31	32	33	NXSC	Pts	Ref
2015	SS-Green Light Racing	90	Chevy	DAY	ATL	LVS	PHO	CAL	TEX	BRI	RCH	TAL	IOW	CLT	DOV	MCH	CHI	DAY	KEN	NHA	IND	IOW	GLN	MOH	BRI	ROA	DAR	RCH	CHI	KEN	DOV	CLT	KAN; 31	TEX			104th	0^{1}	
2015	Rick Ware Racing	15	Chevy																																PHO; 32	HOM	104th	0^{1}	
2017	SS-Green Light Racing	07	Chevy	DAY	ATL	LVS	PHO	CAL	TEX	BRI	RCH	TAL	CLT	DOV	POC	MCH; 31	IOW	DAY	KEN	NHA	IND	IOW	GLN	MOH	BRI	ROA	DAR	RCH	CHI	KEN; 33	DOV	CLT	KAN	TEX	PHO	HOM	110th	0^{1}	
2020	DGM Racing	36	Chevy	DAY	LVS	CAL	PHO	DAR	CLT	BRI	ATL	HOM	HOM	TAL	POC	IND	KEN	KEN	TEX	KAN	ROA	DAY	DOV; 32	DOV; 32	DAY	DAR	RCH	RCH	BRI	LVS	TAL	CLT	KAN	TEX	MAR	PHO	85th	0^{1}	

==== Gander RV & Outdoors Truck Series ====
NASCAR Gander RV & Outdoors Truck Series results
Year	Team	No.	Make	1	2	3	4	5	6	7	8	9	10	11	12	13	14	15	16	17	18	19	20	21	22	23	NGTC	Pts	Ref
2014	SS-Green Light Racing	08	Chevy	DAY	MAR; 26	KAN	CLT	DOV	TEX	GTW; 21	KEN		ELD; 24	POC	MCH	BRI	MSP	CHI	NHA	LVS				PHO; 15	HOM		36th	126	
2014	SS-Green Light Racing	07	Chevy									IOW; 33									TAL; 19	MAR	TEX				36th	126	
2015	SS-Green Light Racing	08	Chevy	DAY; 12	ATL; 20	MAR; 23	KAN; 22	CLT; 29	DOV; 17	TEX; 18	GTW; 22	IOW; 26	KEN; 21	ELD; 24	POC; 27	MCH; 22	BRI; 27	MSP; 18	CHI; 27	NHA; 29	LVS; 27	TAL; 15	MAR	TEX; 22	PHO; 30	HOM; 27	18th	463	
2016	Lira Motorsports	59	Ford	DAY; DNQ	ATL; DNQ	MAR	KAN	DOV	CLT	TEX	IOW	GTW	KEN														71st	6	
2016	Empire Racing	43	Ford											ELD; DNQ	POC	BRI	MCH	MSP	CHI	NHA	LVS						71st	6	
2016	Wauters Motorsports	5	Toyota																			TAL; 27	MAR	TEX	PHO	HOM	71st	6	
2017	Wauters Motorsports	5	Toyota	DAY; 20	ATL; 22	MAR	KAN	CLT	DOV	TEX	GTW	IOW	KEN														44th	45	
2017	JJC Racing	0	Chevy											ELD; 28	POC	MCH	BRI	MSP	CHI	NHA	LVS	TAL	MAR	TEX	PHO	HOM	44th	45	
2018	All Out Motorsports	7	Toyota	DAY; 16	ATL; 16	LVS	MAR	DOV; 21	KAN	CLT; DNQ	TEX; 22	IOW	GTW	CHI; 18	KEN; 13	ELD	POC	MCH; 24	BRI; 27	MSP	LVS; 13	TAL; 15	MAR	TEX	PHO	HOM	23rd	188	
2019	All Out Motorsports	7	Toyota	DAY; DNQ	ATL; 21	LVS; 14	MAR; 25	TEX; 24	DOV; 30	KAN	CLT; 25	TEX	IOW	GTW	CHI	KEN	POC	ELD	MCH	BRI	MSP	LVS	TAL; 13	MAR	PHO	HOM	34th	107	
2020	All Out Motorsports	7	Toyota	DAY; 18	LVS; DNQ	CLT; 24	ATL; 29	HOM; 33	POC; 24	KEN; 34	TEX	KAN; 35	KAN; Wth	MCH	DAY	DOV	GTW	DAR	RCH	BRI	LVS						45th	73	
2020	All Out Motorsports	17	Toyota																			TAL; 36	KAN	TEX	MAR	PHO	45th	73	

^{*} Season still in progress
^{1} Ineligible for series points

=== ARCA Racing Series ===
(key) (Bold – Pole position awarded by qualifying time. Italics – Pole position earned by points standings or practice time. * – Most laps led.)

ARCA Racing Series results
Year	Team	No.	Make	1	2	3	4	5	6	7	8	9	10	11	12	13	14	15	16	17	18	19	20	21	ARSC	Pts	Ref
2012	Lafferty Motorsports	89	Chevy	DAY	MOB; DNQ	SLM	TAL																		30th	790	
2012	Kimmel Racing	68	Ford					TOL; 28								IRP; 24	POC	BLN	ISF	MAD	SLM				30th	790	
2012	Kimmel Racing	69	Ford						ELK; 25	POC; 29	MCH; 31	WIN; 29	NJE	IOW; 37	CHI; 32							DSF; C	KAN; 26		30th	790	
2013	Kimmel Racing	69	Ford	DAY	MOB; 14	SLM		TOL; 25	ELK	POC															48th	570	
2013	Cunningham Motorsports	22	Dodge				TAL; 13																		48th	570	
2013	Carter 2 Motorsports	40	Dodge								MCH; 18	ROA	WIN	CHI	NJE	POC	BLN	ISF	MAD	DSF	IOW	SLM	KEN	KAN	48th	570	
2016	Lira Motorsports	59	Ford	DAY	NSH	SLM	TAL; 22	TOL	NJE	POC	MCH	MAD	WIN	IOW	IRP	POC	BLN	ISF	DSF	SLM	CHI	KEN	KAN		122nd	120	

=== CARS Super Late Model Tour ===
(key)

CARS Super Late Model Tour results
Year	Team	No.	Make	1	2	3	4	5	6	7	8	9	10	CSLMTC	Pts	Ref
2016	Wauters Motorsports	5	N/A	SNM	ROU	HCY	TCM	GRE	ROU	CON	MYB; 15	HCY	SNM	54th	18	
