= John Hunter Nemechek =

American racing driver (born 1997)

- Nemechek at Las Vegas Motor Speedway in 2026
- Born: John Hunter Nemechek; June 11, 1997 (age 29); Mooresville, North Carolina, U.S.
- Achievements: 2021 NASCAR Camping World Truck Series Regular Season Champion; 2014 Snowball Derby Winner; 2014 All American 400 Winner; 2015, 2016 Master of the Pros 144 Winner; 2014, 2015, 2016 SpeedFest 125 Winner; 2015 Snowflake 100 Winner; 2012 Allison Legacy Series Champion
- Awards: 2015 NASCAR Camping World Truck Series Most Popular Driver

NASCAR Cup Series career
- 149 races run over 7 years
- 2026 position: 29th
- Best finish: 25th (2025)
- First race: 2019 AAA Texas 500 (Texas)
- Last race: 2026 Season Finale 400 (Homestead)
Wins	Top tens	Poles
0	17	0

NASCAR O'Reilly Auto Parts Series career
- 111 races run over 6 years
- Car no., team: No. 41 (Haas Factory Team)
- 2024 position: 77th
- Best finish: 4th (2023)
- First race: 2018 Rinnai 250 (Atlanta)
- Last race: 2024 Cabo Wabo 250 (Michigan)
- First win: 2018 Kansas Lottery 300 (Kansas)
- Last win: 2024 Tennessee Lottery 250 (Nashville)
Wins	Top tens	Poles
11	67	3

NASCAR FedEx Freight Truck Series career
- 152 races run over 12 years
- 2026 position: 104th
- Best finish: 3rd (2021)
- First race: 2013 Kroger 200 (Martinsville)
- Last race: 2026 Team EJP 175 (New Hampshire)
- First win: 2015 American Ethanol E15 225 (Chicagoland)
- Last win: 2022 Kansas Lottery 200 (Kansas)
Wins	Top tens	Poles
13	84	9

ARCA Menards Series career
- 1 race run over 1 year
- Best finish: 72nd (2022)
- First race: 2022 Dawn 150 (Mid-Ohio)
Wins	Top tens	Poles
0	1	1

ARCA Menards Series East career
- 3 races run over 2 years
- Best finish: 48th (2013)
- First race: 2013 NAPA Auto Parts 150 (Pensacola)
- Last race: 2014 Bully Hill Vineyards 125 (Watkins Glen)
Wins	Top tens	Poles
0	0	0
- Statistics up to date as of November 8, 2026.

John Hunter Nemechek (born June 11, 1997) is an American professional stock car racing driver. He competes full-time in the NASCAR O'Reilly Auto Parts Series, driving the No. 41 Chevrolet Camaro SS for Haas Factory Team.

Nemechek is the son of NASCAR driver Joe Nemechek and was the 2012 champion in the Allison Legacy Series.

== Early life and family background ==
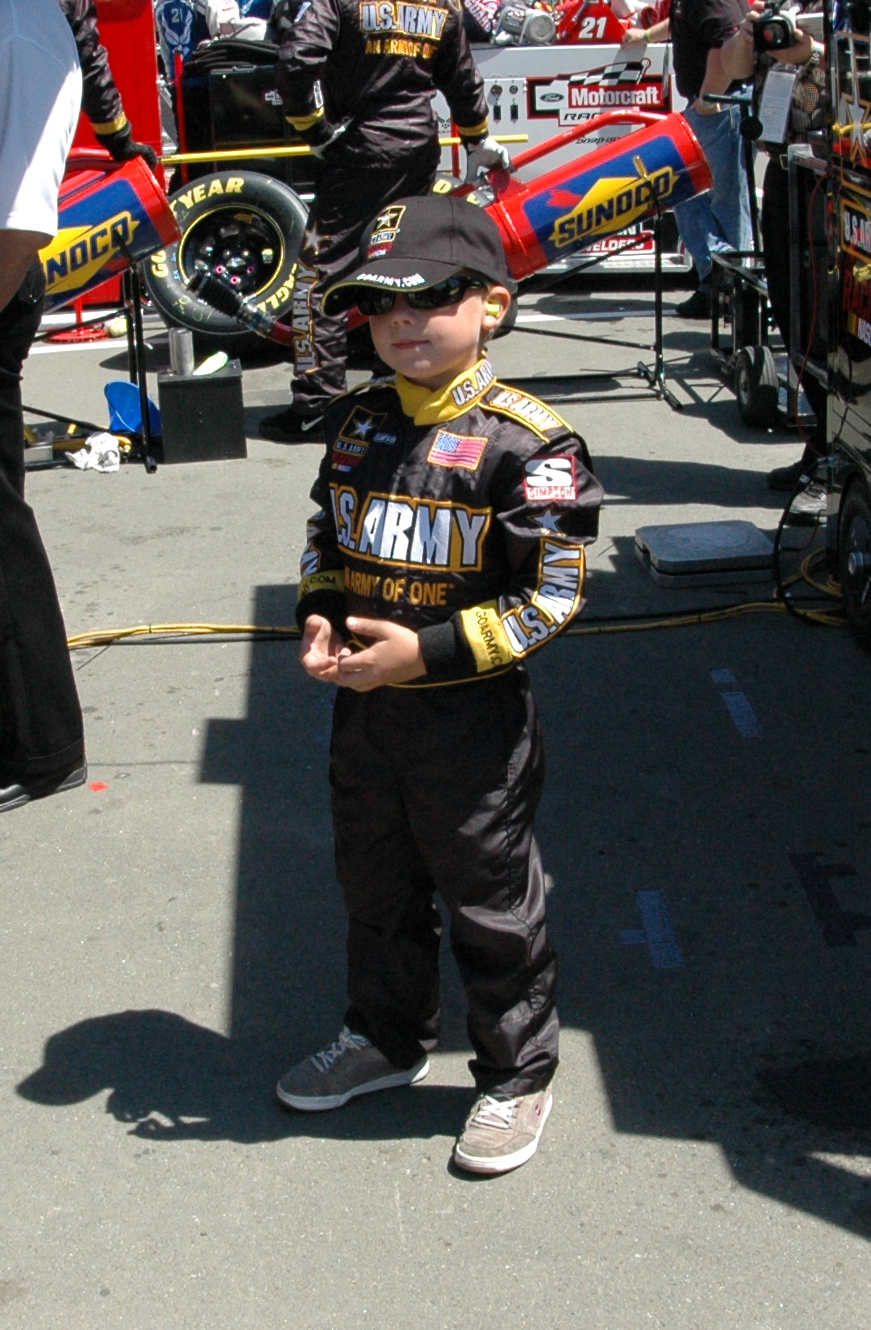
A young Nemechek in the pits at Infineon Raceway (now Sonoma Raceway) in 2005

Born on June 11, 1997, Nemechek is a native of Mooresville, North Carolina. He was named after his uncle, John Nemechek, who had been killed in a racing accident earlier that year in a NASCAR Craftsman Truck Series event at Homestead–Miami Speedway. He was a student at the Davidson Day School in Davidson, North Carolina. Nemechek was born the oldest of three full siblings. Nemechek also has one older half-brother.

Nemechek was the subject of a children's book on racing, Racin' Buddies, written by his father in 2001.

== Racing career ==
=== Early career ===
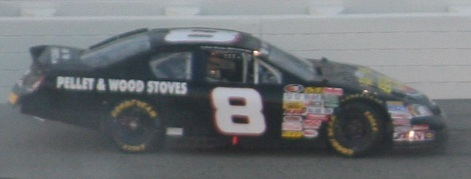
Nemechek's 2013 K&N Pro Series car

Nemechek began his racing career at the age of five, competing in go-karts, quarter midget cars and in dirt bike competition. He moved up to stock car competition in 2010, competing in the Allison Legacy Series with sponsorship from England Stove Works.

In 2012, Nemechek moved up to late model and super late model competition, competing in the Champion Racing Association Super Series and American Speed Association Midwest Tour; he also competed in the World Series of Asphalt at New Smyrna Speedway during Speedweeks. Nemechek won praise from Sprint Cup Series driver Kyle Busch following a CRA Super Series race in which both drivers competed.

In June 2012, Nemechek won the pole for the Howie Lettow Memorial 150, an ASA Midwest Tour event, at the Milwaukee Mile; he was scheduled to take a driver's education course the following week as he had just passed his fifteenth birthday. He finished 23rd in the event.

After competing in the 2012 Snowball Derby, starting second and finishing tenth, Nemechek won the 2012 Allison Legacy Series championship, winning fifteen of the season's eighteen races.

In 2013, Nemechek moved to compete in the Southern Super Series as well as selected races in the NASCAR K&N Pro Series East, starting with the UNOH Battle at the Beach at Daytona International Speedway in February.

In 2014, Nemechek won the 300-lap Snowball Derby.

=== NASCAR Craftsman Truck Series ===
==== 2013–2020: NEMCO Motorsports ====
In late 2013, Nemechek made his debut in the Camping World Truck Series, driving the No. 22 Toyota for SWM-NEMCO Motorsports, a brief joint venture between Joe Nemechek and Sid Maudlin. He finished nineteenth at Martinsville and 21st at Phoenix. He competed in two events, with the best finish of 16th.

Nemechek ran ten races during the 2014 season, finishing a season-best fifth place at New Hampshire.

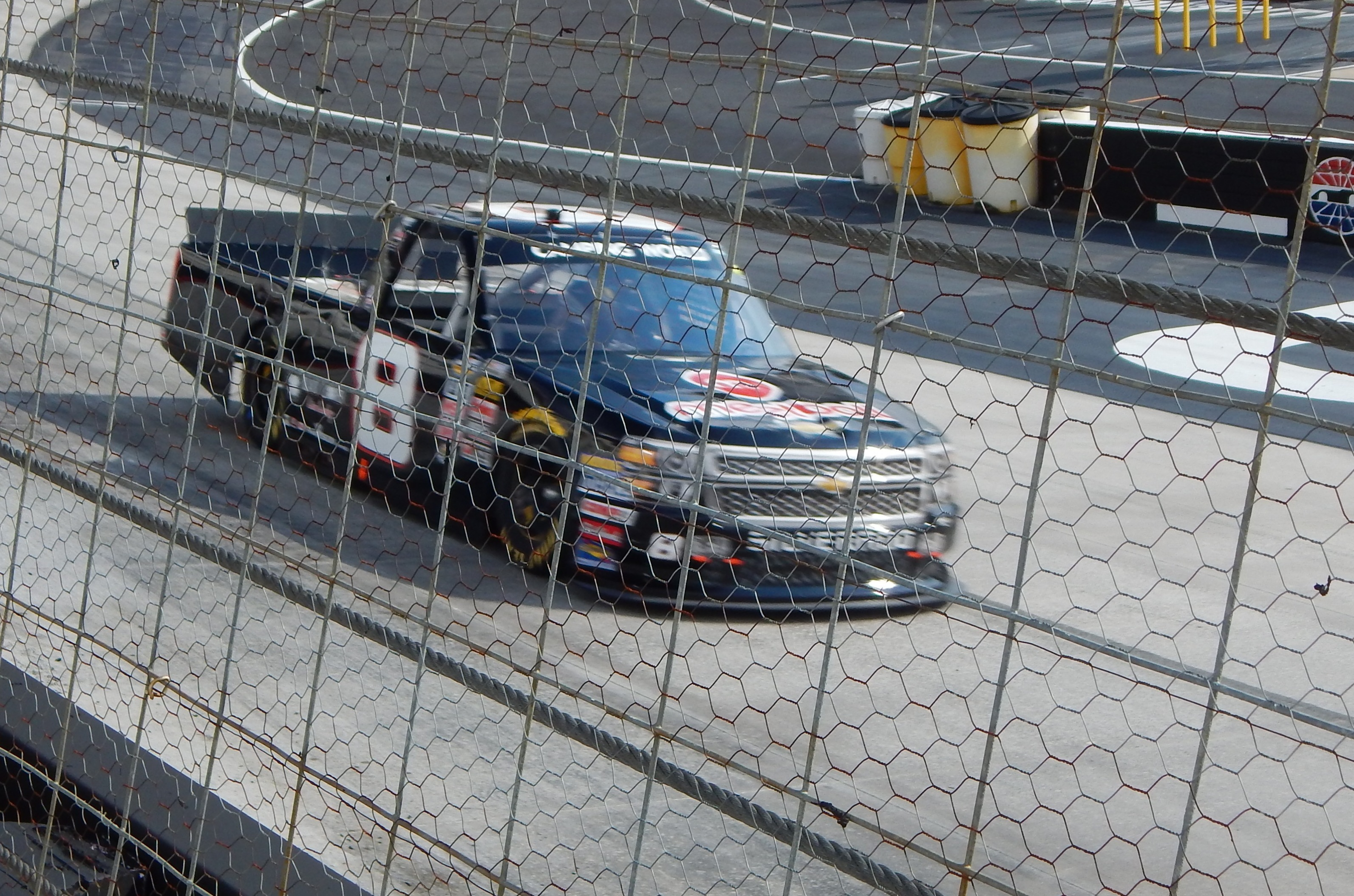
Nemechek's truck in 2015

For the 2015 season, Nemechek ran all but five races in the schedule. On September 19, sixteen years to the day his father won his first Cup race, he won his first Truck Series race at Chicagoland. At the end of the season, Nemechek finished twelfth in points and received the NASCAR's Most Popular Driver Award.

For his first full-time season in 2016, Nemechek won at Atlanta. At Canada, Nemechek and Cole Custer battled for the lead when Nemechek bumped Custer, which led to Nemechek losing control and intentionally sending both drivers off-road, pinning Custer to the wall. Before the winner was declared, Nemechek was tackled by Custer; Nemechek would be named the winner. Nemechek finished the season eighth in the points standings.

In 2017, Nemechek won back-to-back races at Gateway and Iowa. He missed the Championship Four after finishing second at Phoenix. His season ended once again with an eighth place in the points standings.

From 2018 to 2020, Nemechek scaled back to a part-time schedule. During those years, he scored a win at Martinsville in 2018.

==== 2021–2022: Kyle Busch Motorsports ====
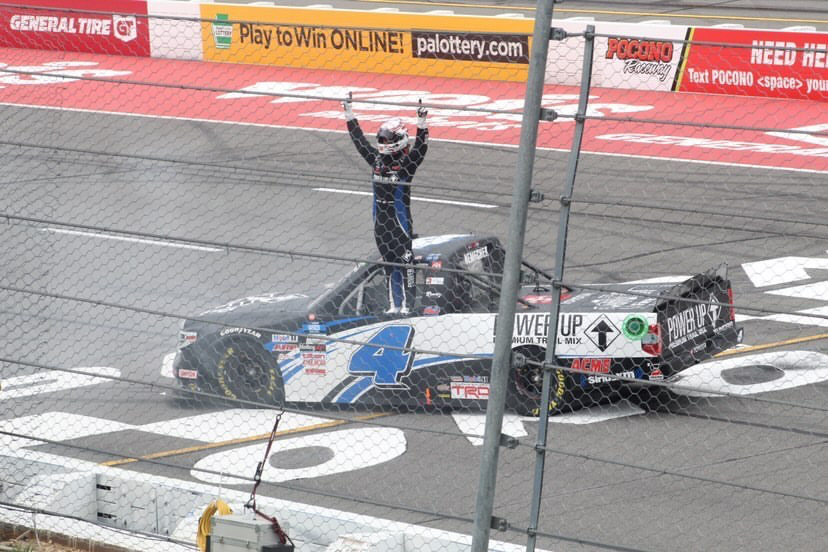
Nemechek celebrating after winning at Pocono.

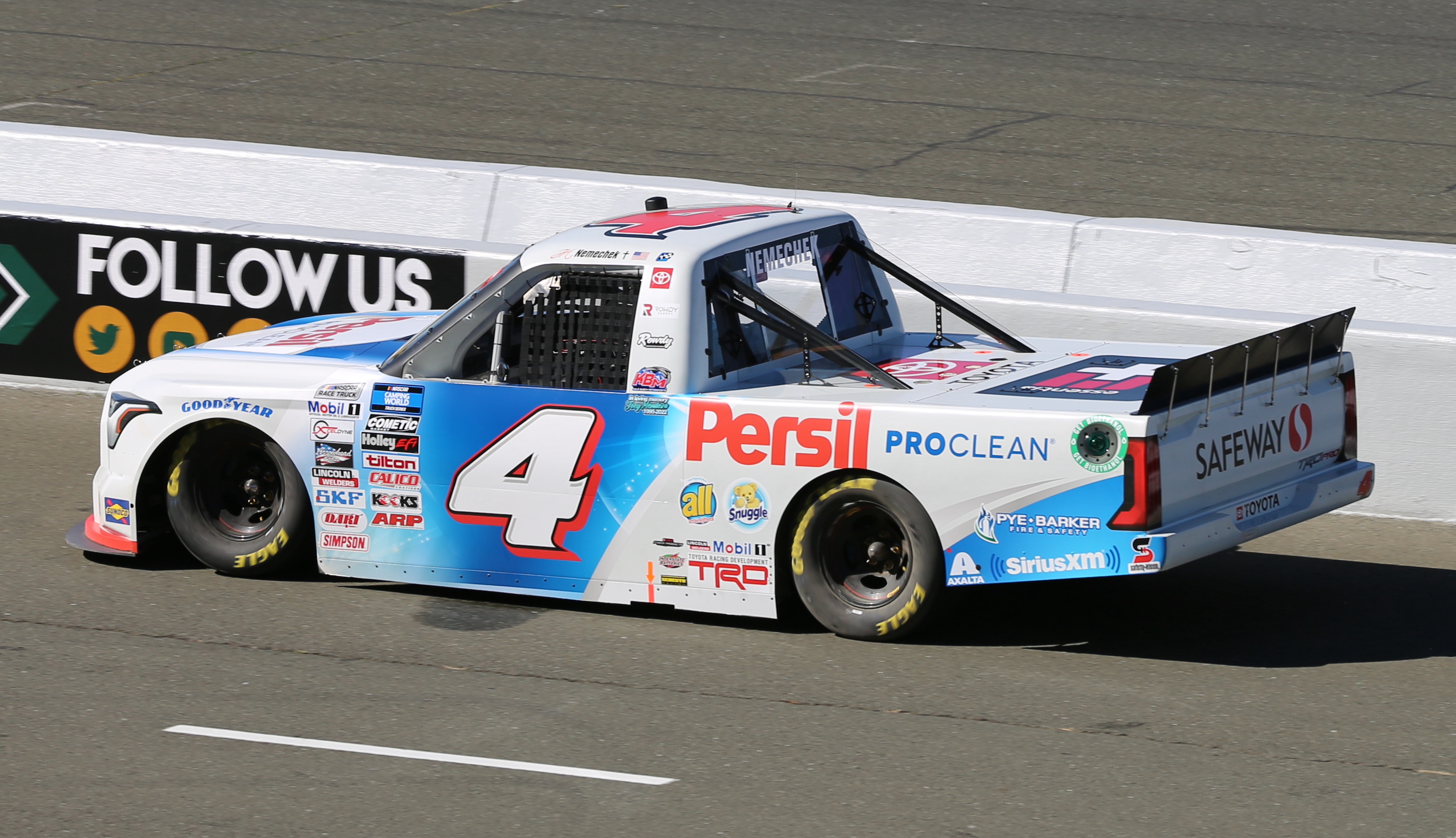
Nemechek's No. 4 truck at Sonoma Raceway in 2022

In November 2020, after parting ways with Front Row Motorsports in the Cup Series, Nemechek signed with Kyle Busch Motorsports for the 2021 Truck Series season. During the 2021 season, he scored wins at Las Vegas, Richmond, Charlotte, Texas, and Pocono. Aside from clinching the regular season championship, Nemechek finished the season with a career-best third in the points standings.

In 2022, Nemechek won at Darlington and Kansas and finished fifth in the points standings.

==== 2023, 2026: Part-time ====
Nemechek drove two races for Tricon Garage in 2023, finishing 31st at Las Vegas and third at Atlanta.

In 2026, Nemechek drove Halmar Friesen Racing's No. 62 at Daytona and Atlanta. He led the final corner of Daytona but had to settle for fifth. He drove the No. 5 for Tricon at New Hampshire.

=== NASCAR O'Reilly Auto Parts Series ===
==== 2018: Chip Ganassi Racing ====
For the 2018 season, Nemechek joined Chip Ganassi Racing to drive the No. 42 NASCAR Xfinity Series car on a part-time basis. In his debut at Atlanta, he finished fourth, despite being in an early wreck involving Elliott Sadler and Cole Custer. Nemechek won at Kansas and finished thirteenth in the points standings.

==== 2019: GMS Racing ====
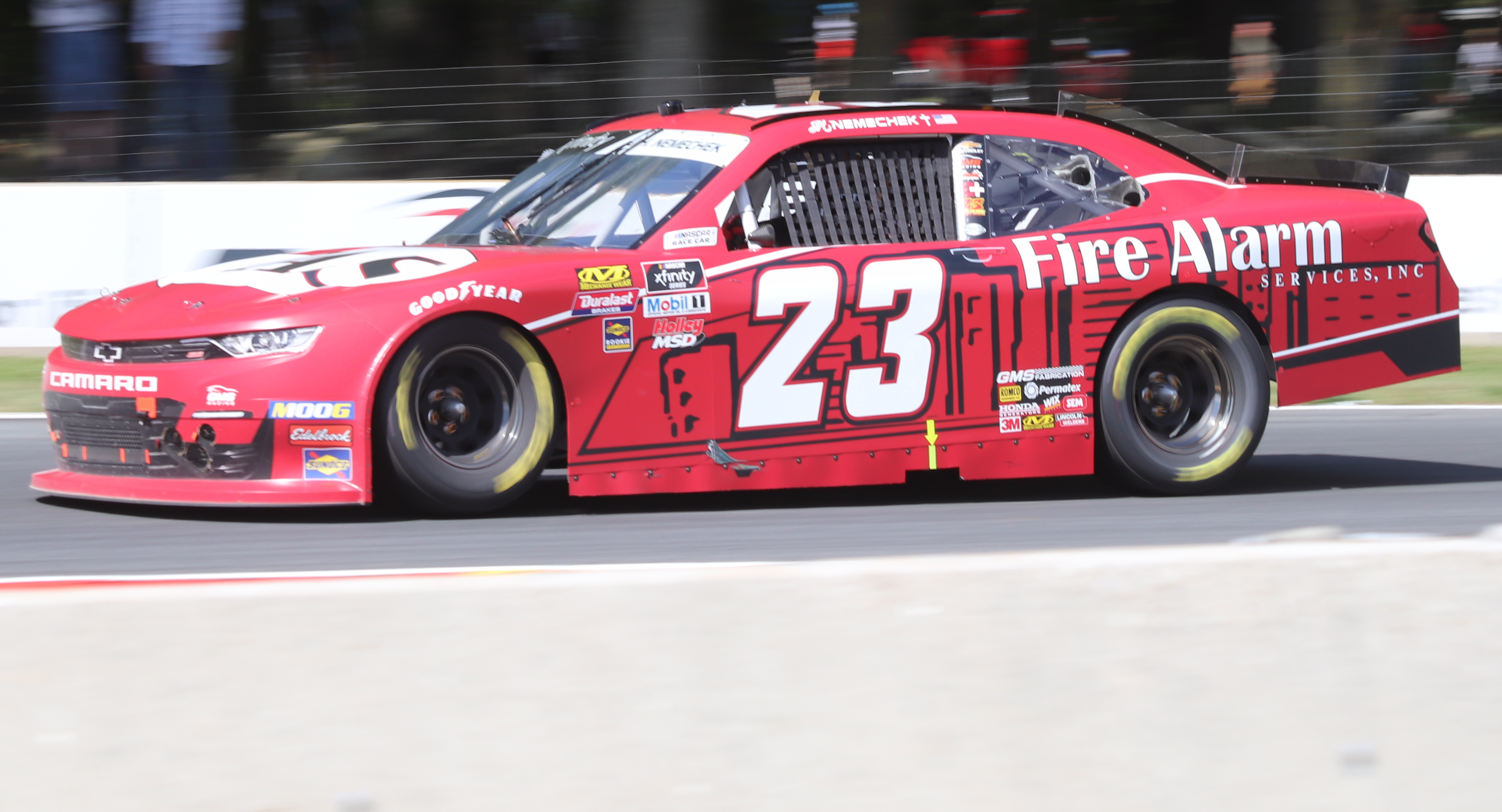
Nemechek's No. 23 in 2019

In 2019, Nemechek signed with GMS Racing for the full Xfinity schedule in the No. 23 Chevrolet. On November 9, Nemechek and his father Joe made motorsports history at Phoenix by being the first father-son duo to race in all three main series in one weekend. Despite not winning a race, Nemechek finished the season seventh in points after finishing sixth at Homestead.

==== 2021–2022: Part-time with Sam Hunt Racing and Joe Gibbs Racing ====
For 2021 and 2022, Nemechek ran part-time in the Xfinity Series with Sam Hunt Racing and Joe Gibbs Racing. During those years, he won at Texas in 2021.

==== 2023–2024: Joe Gibbs Racing ====
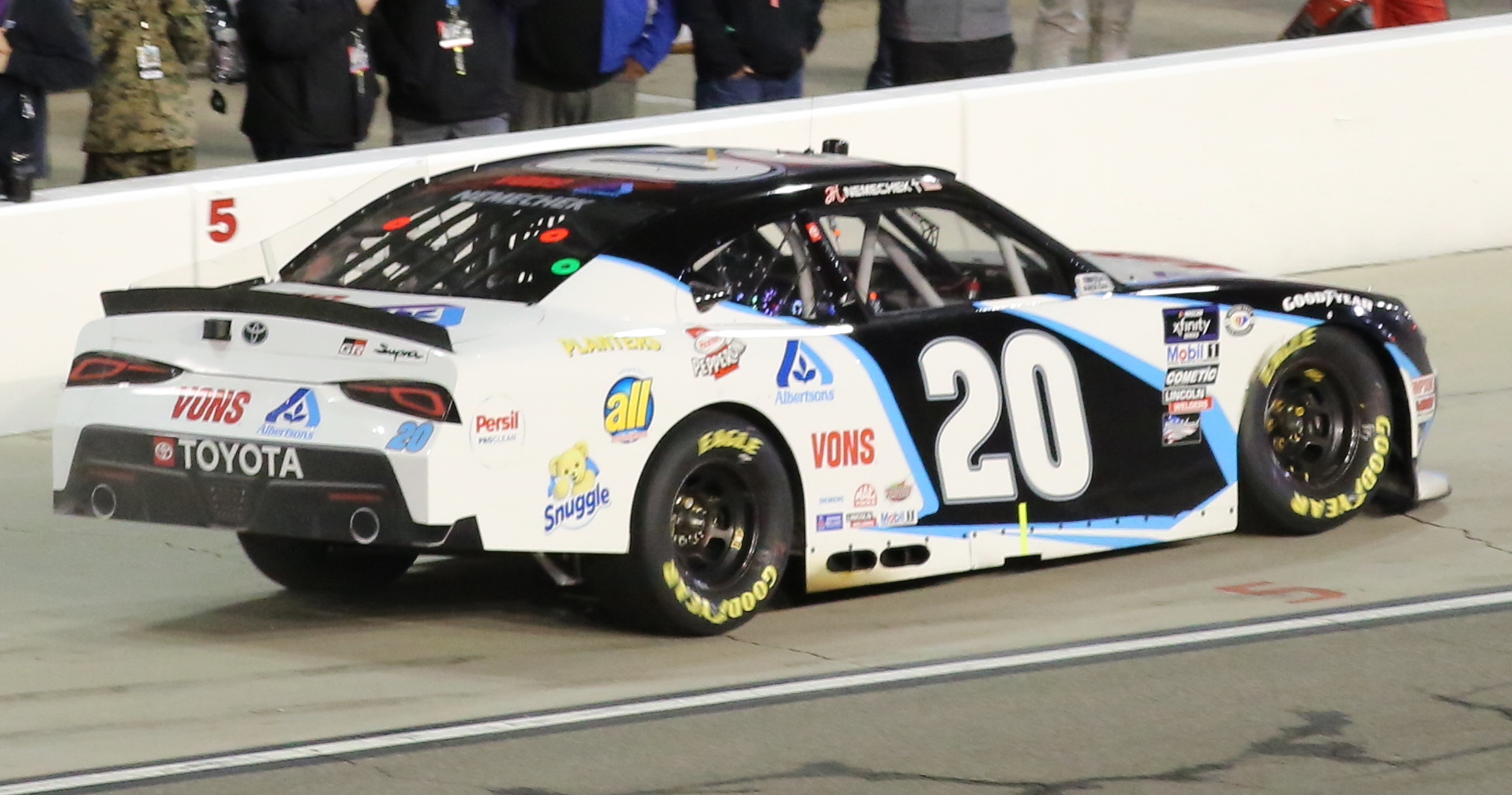
Nemechek at Auto Club Speedway in 2023

In December 2022, Joe Gibbs Racing announced that Nemechek would pilot the returning No. 20 Toyota Supra full-time for the 2023 season in the Xfinity Series. Nemechek began the 2023 Xfinity season with a second-place finish at Daytona. Throughout the season, he scored wins at Fontana, Martinsville, Atlanta, New Hampshire, Michigan, and Kansas. During the playoffs, Nemechek won at Texas. He finished 28th at Phoenix and fourth in the points standings.

While running full-time with Legacy Motor Club in the Cup Series, Nemechek shared the No. 20 with Aric Almirola for the 2024 Xfinity season. He started the season with a seventh-place finish at Daytona. Throughout the season, he scored wins at Las Vegas and Nashville.

==== 2027: Haas Factory Team ====
On November 4, 2026, it was announced that Nemechek would drive the No. 41 Chevrolet Camaro SS for Haas Factory Team.

=== NASCAR Cup Series ===
==== 2019–2020: Front Row Motorsports ====
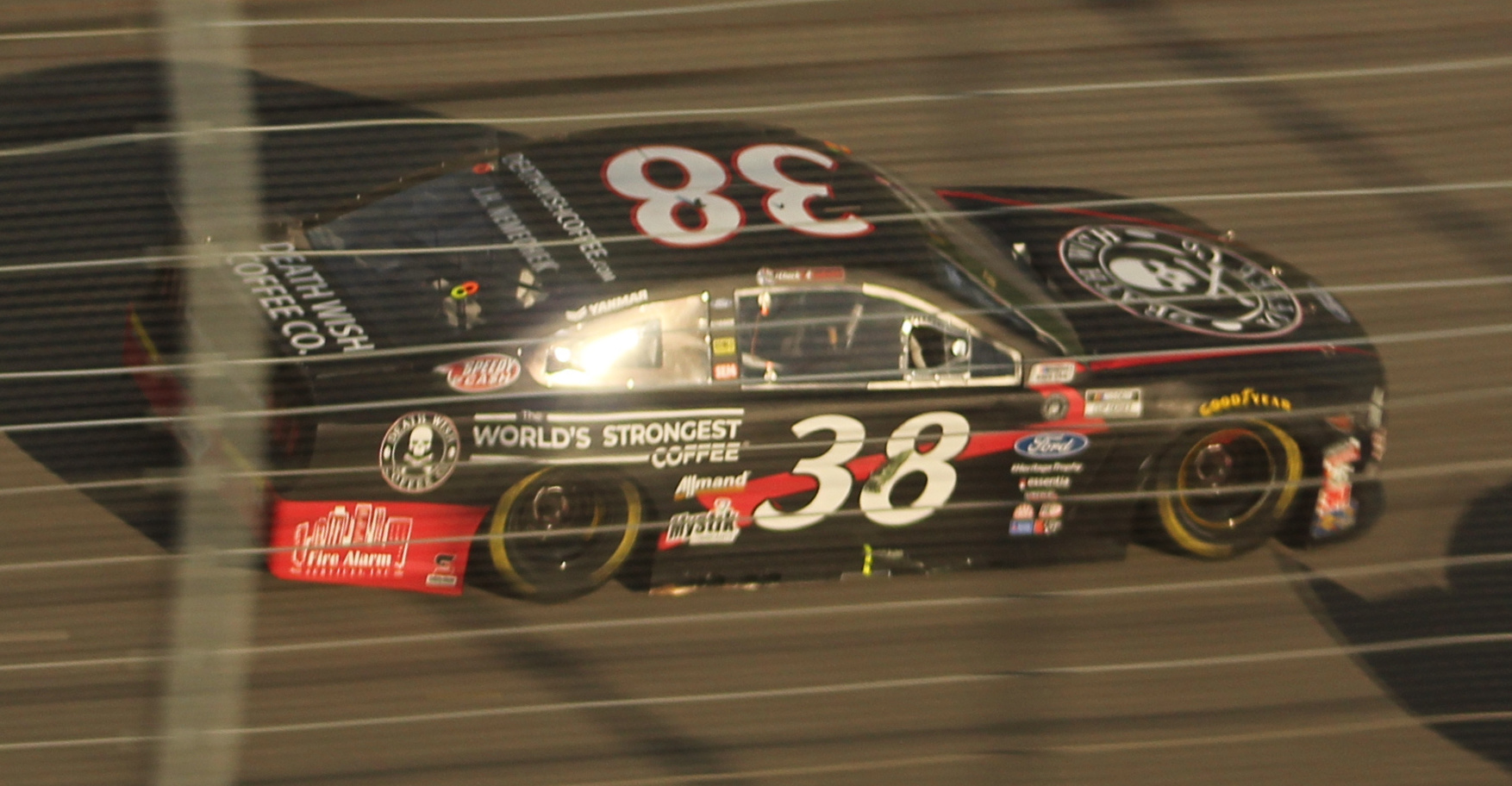
Nemechek's No. 38 at Michigan International Speedway in 2020

On October 29, 2019, Front Row Motorsports announced that Nemechek would fill in for Matt Tifft in the No. 36 Ford for the final three races of the 2019 Monster Energy NASCAR Cup Series after medical issues forced Tifft from the ride. On December 12, FRM announced that Nemechek would replace David Ragan as the driver of the No. 38 Ford for the 2020 season, competing for the 2020 NASCAR Rookie of the Year honors.

Nemechek started the 2020 season with an 11th-place finish in the 2020 Daytona 500. After a two-month break, four races into the season due to the COVID-19 pandemic, Nemechek would get the first top-ten of his Cup career in the first race in the double-header at Darlington. This would also be the first top-ten for FRM at a track other than Talladega or Daytona since 2016. Nemechek would not get another top-ten until the Talladega spring race, where he finished eighth. He scored his third top-ten with another eighth-place finish at the Talladega fall race and finished the season 27th in the points standings. On November 16, Nemechek parted ways with Front Row Motorsports.

==== 2022: Part-time with 23XI Racing ====
On October 18, 2022, it was announced that Nemechek would return to the Cup Series for the race at Homestead-Miami Speedway, filling in for Bubba Wallace in the 23XI Racing No. 45 car after Wallace was suspended for the race after he intentionally retaliated against, crashed and fought Kyle Larson in the previous week's race at Las Vegas. Nemechek actually had a chance to drive that car earlier in the season after Kurt Busch's concussion although 23XI decided to instead put Ty Gibbs in the car despite Nemechek being selected as the team's reserve driver at the start of the season. (Wallace, the driver of the team's No. 23 car, would switch cars with Gibbs during the playoffs to compete for the owners' championship.)

==== 2024: Legacy Motor Club ====
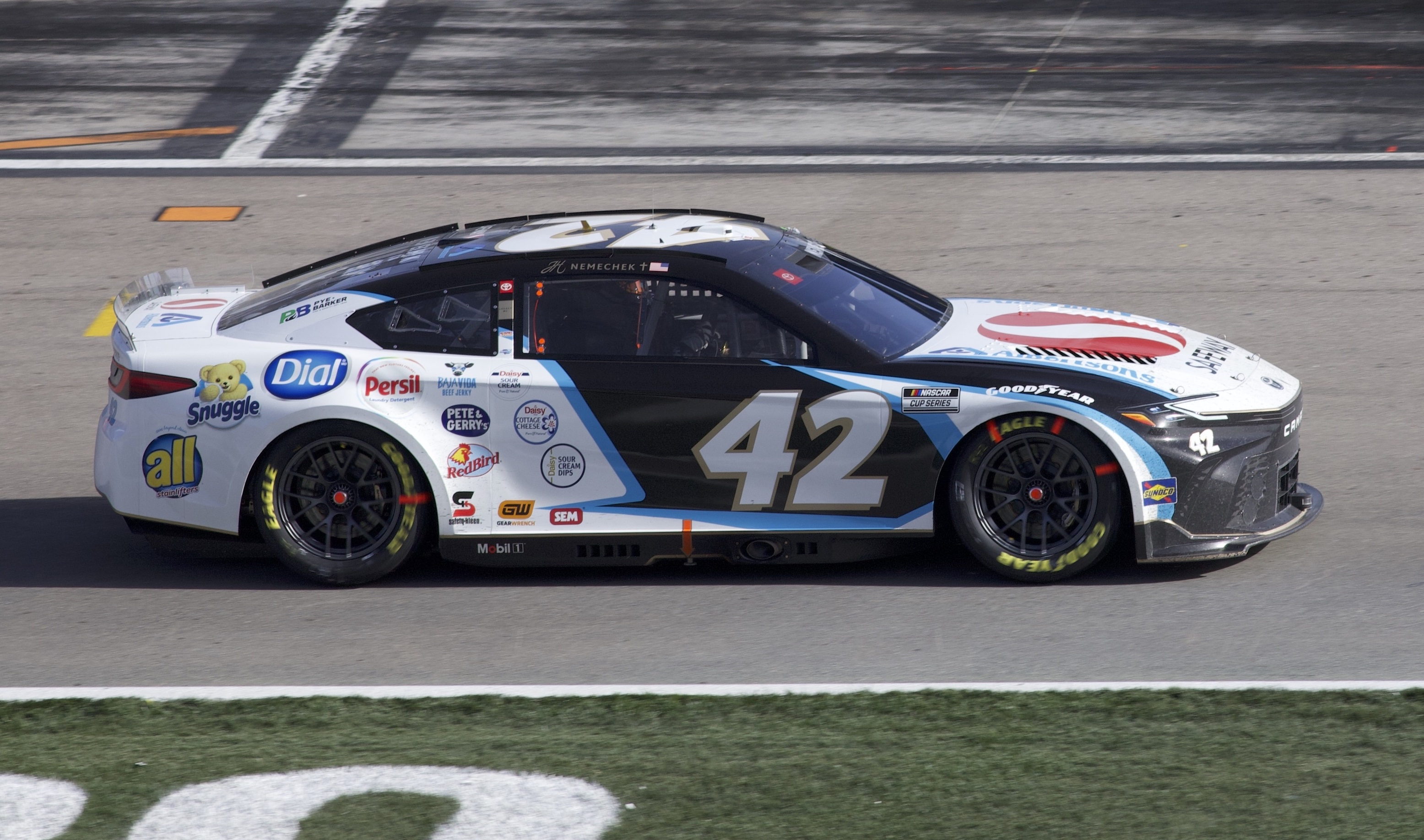
Nemechek's No. 42 car at Las Vegas Motor Speedway in 2024

On September 6, 2023, Legacy Motor Club announced that Nemechek would drive the No. 42 full-time in the Cup Series in 2024, his first full-time ride since the 2020 season. In October, Nemecheck was tapped to drive the No. 42 Sunseeker Camaro at Homestead. His season contained four top-ten finishes, including a season-best result of sixth at Bristol, though a number of poor finishes led him to 34th in the standings — last of all full-time entrants. On November 19, LMC named Travis Mack as the crew chief of the No. 42 in 2025.

==== 2025 ====
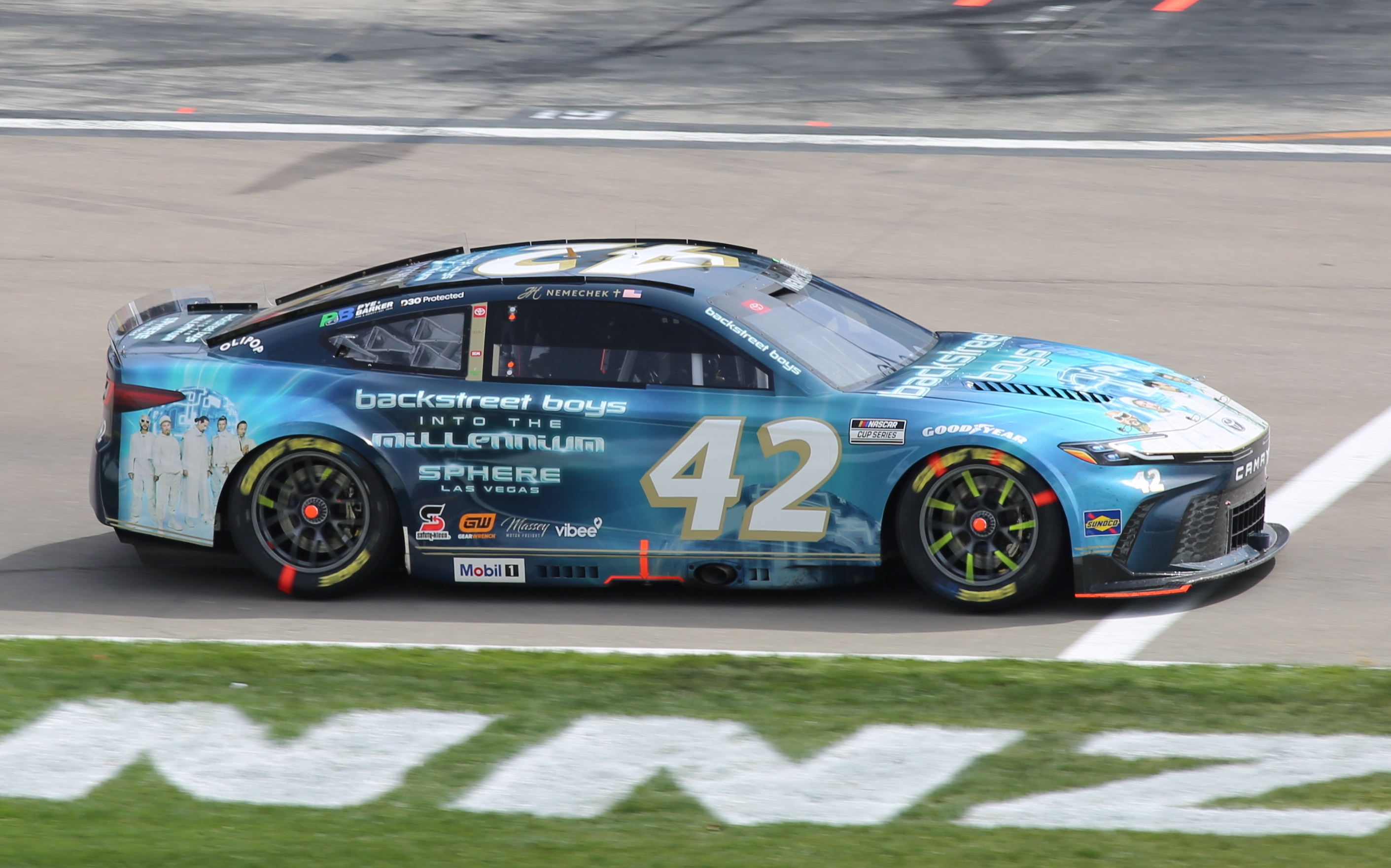
Nemechek's No. 42 car at Las Vegas Motor Speedway in 2025

Nemechek started the 2025 season with a fifth-place finish at 2025 Daytona 500, a career best. He followed that up with a tenth-place finish at Atlanta.

==== 2026 ====
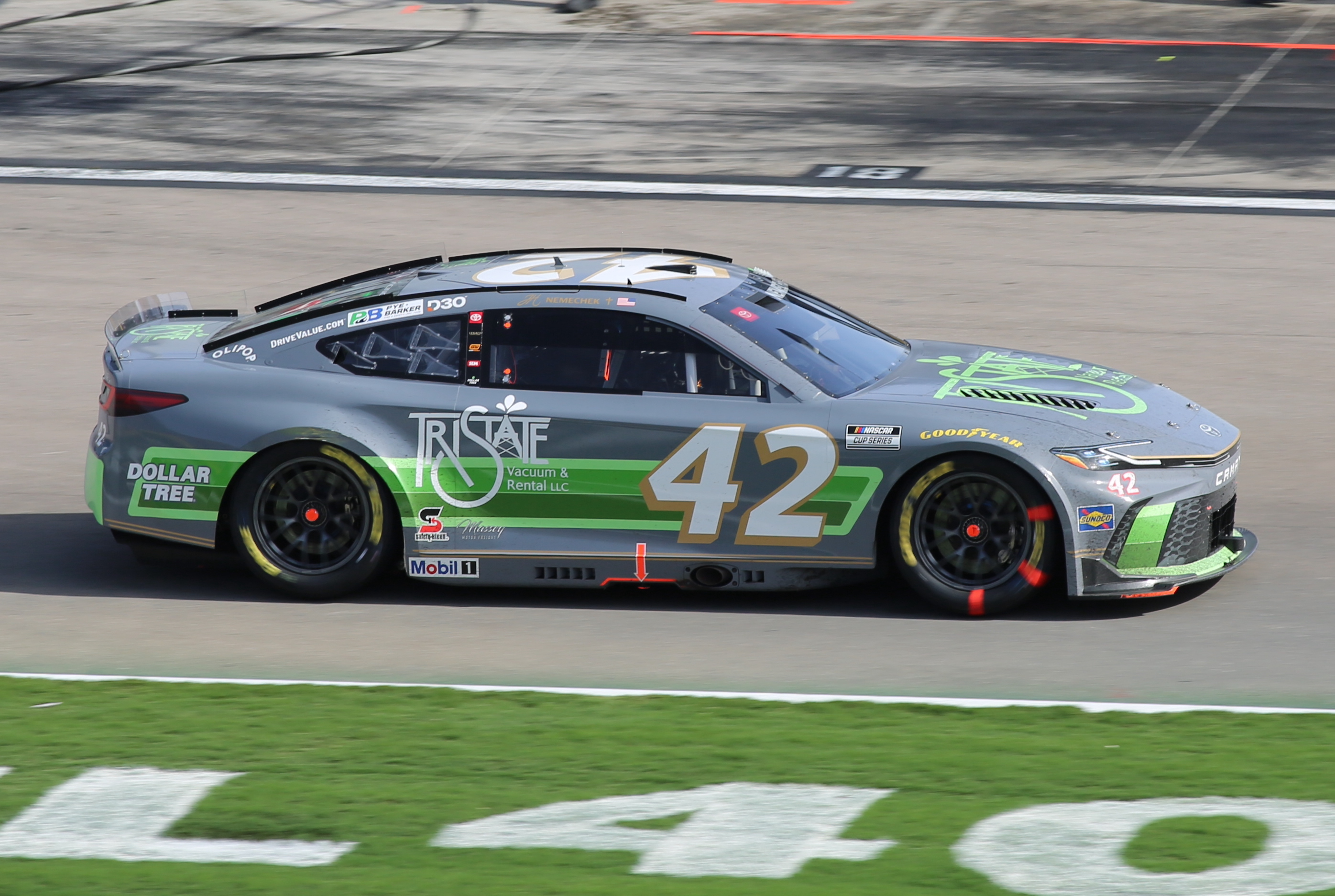
Nemechek's No. 42 car at Las Vegas Motor Speedway in 2026

Nemechek started the 2026 season with a 26th-place DNF at 2026 Daytona 500. He led most of the Pocono race on alternate strategy but was later passed by Denny Hamlin, finishing 4th. In May, Nemechek initially signed a deal with LMC for 2027, however in September, it was confirmed that the team had bought out his contract and would be parting ways at the end of the season.

=== Other racing ===
On July 5, 2022, it was announced that Nemechek would run the main ARCA Menards Series race at Mid-Ohio Sports Car Course in the No. 55 car for Venturini Motorsports in preparation for the Truck Series race there on the same weekend. It was his debut in the series.

On January 11, 2024, it was announced that Nemechek would make his sportscar debut in the IMSA Michelin Pilot Challenge at Daytona, piloting the No. 23 Toyota GR Supra GT4 EVO with codrivers Bubba Wallace and Corey Heim.

== Motorsports career results ==
=== Racing career summary ===
Season	Series	Team	Races	Wins	Top 5	Top 10	Points	Position
2013	NASCAR K&N Pro Series East	Spraker Racing	1	0	0	0	46	48th
2013	NASCAR K&N Pro Series East	SWM-NEMCO Motorsports	1	0	0	0	46	48th
2013	NASCAR Camping World Truck Series	SWM-NEMCO Motorsports	2	0	0	0	51	45th
2014	NASCAR K&N Pro Series East	SWM-NEMCO Motorsports	1	0	0	0	19	65th
2014	NASCAR Camping World Truck Series	SWM-NEMCO Motorsports	10	0	1	5	337	23rd
2015	CARS Super Late Model Tour	SWM-NEMCO Motorsports	1	0	0	0	17	53rd
2015	NASCAR Camping World Truck Series	SWM-NEMCO Motorsports	18	1	8	10	630	12th
2016	CARS Super Late Model Tour	NEMCO Motorsports	1	0	0	0	17	57th
2016	NASCAR Camping World Truck Series	NEMCO Motorsports	23	2	5	11	2133	8th
2017	NASCAR Camping World Truck Series	NEMCO Motorsports	23	2	8	11	2206	8th
2018	NASCAR Camping World Truck Series	NEMCO Motorsports	18	1	6	10	0	NC†
2018	NASCAR Xfinity Series	Chip Ganassi Racing	18	1	6	11	643	13th
2019	NASCAR Gander Outdoors Truck Series	NEMCO Motorsports	5	0	0	1	0	NC†
2019	NASCAR Xfinity Series	GMS Racing	33	0	6	19	2253	7th
2019	Monster Energy NASCAR Cup Series	Front Row Motorsports	3	0	0	0	0	NC†
2020	NASCAR Gander Outdoors Truck Series	NEMCO Motorsports	3	0	0	1	0	NC†
2020	NASCAR Cup Series	Front Row Motorsports	36	0	0	3	534	27th
2021	NASCAR Camping World Truck Series	Kyle Busch Motorsports	23	5	12	16	4030	**3rd**
2021	NASCAR Xfinity Series	Sam Hunt Racing	2	0	1	1	0	NC†
2021	NASCAR Xfinity Series	Joe Gibbs Racing	3	1	1	2	0	NC†
2022	ARCA Menards Series	Venturini Motorsports	1	0	1	1	42	72nd
2022	NASCAR Camping World Truck Series	Kyle Busch Motorsports	23	2	10	15	2285	5th
2022	NASCAR Xfinity Series	Sam Hunt Racing	8	0	2	3	0	NC†
2022	NASCAR Xfinity Series	Joe Gibbs Racing	3	0	1	1	0	NC†
2022	NASCAR Cup Series	23XI Racing	1	0	0	0	0	NC†
2023	Michelin Pilot Challenge	TGR Smooge Racing	1	0	0	0	40	27th
2023	NASCAR Craftsman Truck Series	TRICON Garage	2	0	1	1	0	NC†
2023	NASCAR Xfinity Series	Joe Gibbs Racing	33	7	17	24	4009	4th
2023	NASCAR Cup Series	Legacy Motor Club	1	0	0	0	0	NC†
2024	NASCAR Xfinity Series	Sam Hunt Racing	1	0	0	0	0	NC†
2024	NASCAR Xfinity Series	Joe Gibbs Racing	10	2	4	6	0	NC†
2024	NASCAR Cup Series	Legacy Motor Club	36	0	0	4	447	34th
2025	NASCAR Cup Series	Legacy Motor Club	36	0	2	8	664	25th
2026	NASCAR Craftsman Truck Series	TRICON Garage	3	0	1	2	0	NC†
2026	NASCAR Cup Series	Legacy Motor Club	36	0	1	2	517	29th

^{†} As Nemechek was a guest driver, he was ineligible for championship points.

=== NASCAR ===
(key) (Bold – Pole position awarded by time. Italics – Pole position earned by points standings. * – Most laps led.)

==== Cup Series ====
NASCAR Cup Series results
Year	Team	No.	Make	1	2	3	4	5	6	7	8	9	10	11	12	13	14	15	16	17	18	19	20	21	22	23	24	25	26	27	28	29	30	31	32	33	34	35	36	NCSC	Pts	Ref
2019	Front Row Motorsports	36	Ford	DAY	ATL	LVS	PHO	CAL	MAR	TEX	BRI	RCH	TAL	DOV	KAN	CLT	POC	MCH	SON	CHI	DAY	KEN	NHA	POC	GLN	MCH	BRI	DAR	IND	LVS	RCH	ROV	DOV	TAL	KAN	MAR	TEX; 21	PHO; 27	HOM; 23	49th	0^{1}	
2020	Front Row Motorsports	38	Ford	DAY; 11	LVS; 24	CAL; 25	PHO; 25	DAR; 9	DAR; 35	CLT; 16	CLT; 13	BRI; 13	ATL; 23	MAR; 25	HOM; 19	TAL; 8	POC; 24	POC; 19	IND; 15	KEN; 36	TEX; 22	KAN; 19	NHA; 36	MCH; 36	MCH; 23	DRC; 35	DOV; 24	DOV; 20	DAY; 11	DAR; 36	RCH; 30	BRI; 20	LVS; 20	TAL; 8	ROV; 36	KAN; 17	TEX; 22	MAR; 26	PHO; 26	27th	534	
2022	23XI Racing	45	Toyota	DAY	CAL	LVS	PHO	ATL	COA	RCH	MAR	BRD	TAL	DOV	DAR	KAN	CLT	GTW	SON	NSH	ROA	ATL	NHA	POC	IRC	MCH	RCH	GLN	DAY	DAR	KAN	BRI	TEX	TAL	ROV	LVS	HOM; 27	MAR	PHO	56th	0^{1}	
2023	Legacy Motor Club	42	Chevy	DAY	CAL	LVS	PHO	ATL	COA	RCH	BRD	MAR	TAL	DOV	KAN	DAR	CLT	GTW	SON	NSH	CSC	ATL	NHA	POC	RCH	MCH	IRC	GLN	DAY	DAR	KAN	BRI	TEX	TAL	ROV	LVS	HOM; 32	MAR	PHO	61st	0^{1}	
2024	Legacy Motor Club	42	Toyota	DAY; 7	ATL; 21	LVS; 22	PHO; 25	BRI; 6	COA; 21	RCH; 25	MAR; 36	TEX; 34	TAL; 33	DOV; 20	KAN; 13	DAR; 31	CLT; 30	GTW; 27	SON; 29	IOW; 26	NHA; 8	NSH; 31	CSC; 35	POC; 28	IND; 29	RCH; 31	MCH; 29	DAY; 15	DAR; 25	ATL; 33	GLN; 24	BRI; 33	KAN; 30	TAL; 31	ROV; 34	LVS; 9	HOM; 26	MAR; 31	PHO; 30	34th	447	
2025	Legacy Motor Club	42	Toyota	DAY; 5	ATL; 10	COA; 22	PHO; 14	LVS; 20	HOM; 23	MAR; 25	DAR; 30	BRI; 21	TAL; 30	TEX; 8	KAN; 10	CLT; 27	NSH; 27	MCH; 34	MXC; 6	POC; 6	ATL; 26	CSC; 15	SON; 28	DOV; 21	IND; 12	IOW; 15	GLN; 32	RCH; 36	DAY; 17	DAR; 4	GTW; 6	BRI; 14	NHA; 34	KAN; 32	ROV; 26	LVS; 29	TAL; 14	MAR; 21	PHO; 31	25th	664	
2026	Legacy Motor Club	42	Toyota	DAY; 26	ATL; 19	COA; 17	PHO; 25	LVS; 21	DAR; 27	MAR; 29	BRI; 35	KAN; 22	TAL; 22	TEX; 21	GLN; 10	CLT; 26	NSH; 24	MCH; 14	POC; 4*	COR; 16	SON; 25	CHI; 23	ATL; 18	NWS; 31	IND; 32	IOW; 19	RCH; 22		DAY; 15	DAR; 24	GTW; 15	BRI; 25	KAN; 13	LVS; 29	CLT; 35	PHO; 33	TAL; 39	MAR; 31	HOM; 30	29th	517	
2026	Legacy Motor Club	40	Toyota																									NHA; 31												29th	517	

===== Daytona 500 =====
Year	Team	Manufacturer	Start	Finish
2020	Front Row Motorsports	Ford	23	11
2024	Legacy Motor Club	Toyota	10	7
2025	Legacy Motor Club	Toyota	18	5
2026	Legacy Motor Club	Toyota	11	26

==== O'Reilly Auto Parts Series ====
NASCAR O'Reilly Auto Parts Series results
Year	Team	No.	Make	1	2	3	4	5	6	7	8	9	10	11	12	13	14	15	16	17	18	19	20	21	22	23	24	25	26	27	28	29	30	31	32	33	NOAPSC	Pts	Ref
2018	Chip Ganassi Racing	42	Chevy	DAY	ATL; 4	LVS	PHO	CAL; 29	TEX	BRI; 13	RCH; 13	TAL; 7	DOV; 14	CLT	POC; 7	MCH; 13	IOW; 15	CHI	DAY	KEN; 7	NHA; 4	IOW; 5	GLN	MOH	BRI	ROA	DAR	IND; 25	LVS	RCH	ROV	DOV; 9	KAN; 1	TEX; 4	**PHO**; 9	HOM; 3	13th	643	
2019	GMS Racing	23	Chevy	DAY; 8	ATL; 20	LVS; 2	PHO; 9	CAL; 28	TEX; 9	BRI; 5	RCH; 7	TAL; 6	DOV; 8	CLT; 12	POC; 12	MCH; 8	IOW; 8	CHI; 11	DAY; 22	KEN; 12	NHA; 36	IOW; 3	GLN; 12	MOH; 31	BRI; 3	ROA; 26	DAR; 21	IND; 31	LVS; 8	RCH; 15	ROV; 7	DOV; 8	KAN; 8	TEX; 5	PHO; 4	HOM; 6	7th	2253	
2021	Sam Hunt Racing	26	Toyota	DAY	DRC	HOM	LVS	PHO	ATL	MAR	TAL	DAR	DOV; 32	COA	CLT	MOH	TEX	NSH	POC	ROA	ATL	NHA	GLN	IRC	MCH	DAY	DAR	RCH; 3	BRI	LVS							74th	0^{1}	
2021	Joe Gibbs Racing	54	Toyota																												TAL; 22	ROV	TEX; 1*	KAN	MAR	PHO; 6	74th	0^{1}	
2022	Sam Hunt Racing	26	Toyota	DAY	CAL	LVS; 12	PHO; 5	ATL	COA					DAR; 4	TEX	CLT	PIR	NSH	ROA; 18	ATL	NHA	POC	IRC	MCH; 19	GLN	DAY; 35	DAR; 9	KAN	BRI				LVS; 16	HOM	MAR	PHO	77th	0^{1}	
2022	Joe Gibbs Racing	18	Toyota							RCH; 2*	MAR	TAL	DOV; 37																	TEX; 28	TAL	ROV					77th	0^{1}	
2023	Joe Gibbs Racing	20	Toyota	DAY; 2	CAL; 1*	LVS; 6	PHO; 6	ATL; 8	COA; 27	RCH; 2	MAR; 1*	TAL; 32	DOV; 5	**DAR**; 5*	CLT; 2	PIR; 10	SON; 16	NSH; 6	CSC; 2	ATL; 1	NHA; 1*	POC; 32	ROA; 34	MCH; 1*	IRC; 13	GLN; 6	DAY; 28	**DAR**; 3*	KAN; 1*	BRI; 3	TEX; 1	ROV; 8	LVS; 2	HOM; 3	MAR; 18	PHO; 28	4th	4009	
2024	Joe Gibbs Racing	20	Toyota	DAY; 7	ATL; 32	LVS; 1*	PHO; 32	COA; 3	RCH	MAR	TEX	TAL	DOV				SON; 8	IOW; 27	NHA	NSH; 1*	CSC; 25	POC	IND	MCH; 3	DAY	DAR	ATL	GLN	BRI	KAN	TAL	ROV	LVS	HOM	MAR	PHO	77th	0^{1}	
2024	Sam Hunt Racing	26	Toyota											DAR; 23	CLT	PIR																					77th	0^{1}	
2027	Haas Factory Team	41	Chevy	DAY	ATL	COA	PHO	LVS	DAR	BRI	MAR	TAL	TEX	DOV	NWS	CLT	NSS	POC	CHI	IOW	SON	IND	COR	BRI	GTW	DAY	DAR	RCH	GLN	KAN	LVS	CLT	PHO	TAL	MAR	HOM			

==== Craftsman Truck Series ====
NASCAR Craftsman Truck Series results
Year	Team	No.	Make	1	2	3	4	5	6	7	8	9	10	11	12	13	14	15	16	17	18	19	20	21	22	23	24	25	NCTC	Pts	Ref
2013	SWM-NEMCO Motorsports	22	Toyota	DAY	MAR	CAR	KAN	CLT	DOV	TEX	KEN	IOW	ELD	POC	MCH	BRI	MSP	IOW	CHI	LVS	TAL	MAR; 19	TEX	PHO; 21	HOM				45th	51	
2014	SWM-NEMCO Motorsports	8	Toyota	DAY	MAR; 12	KAN	CLT	DOV; 6	TEX	GTW; 15	KEN	IOW; 10	ELD; 6	POC	MCH	BRI; 27	MSP; 25	CHI	NHA; 5	LVS	TAL	MAR; 13	TEX	PHO; 7	HOM				23rd	337	
2015	SWM-NEMCO Motorsports	8	Chevy	DAY	ATL	MAR; 29	KAN	CLT	DOV; 22	TEX	GTW; 4	IOW; 23	KEN; 11	ELD; 7	POC; 13	MCH; 12	BRI; 3	MSP; 9	CHI; 1	NHA; 5	LVS; 4	TAL; 11	MAR; 2	TEX; 11	PHO; 2	HOM; 2			12th	630	
2016	NEMCO Motorsports	8	Chevy	DAY; 17	ATL; 1	MAR; 2	KAN; 28	DOV; 15	CLT; 12	TEX; 7	**IOW**; 12	GTW; 6	KEN; 2	ELD; 24	POC; 9	BRI; 8	MCH; 26	MSP; 1	CHI; 14	NHA; 9	LVS; 16	TAL; 32	MAR; 3	TEX; 18	PHO; 6	HOM; 11			8th	2133	
2017	NEMCO Motorsports	8	Chevy	DAY; 4	ATL; 29	MAR; 28	KAN; 3	CLT; 22	DOV; 22	TEX; 21	GTW; 1	IOW; 1	KEN; 18	ELD; 5	POC; 4	MCH; 29	BRI; 3	MSP; 20	CHI; 7	NHA; 20	LVS; 8	TAL; 6	MAR; 30	TEX; 19	PHO; 2	HOM; 15			8th	2206	
2018	NEMCO Motorsports	8	Chevy	DAY; 25	ATL	LVS; 21	MAR; 1	DOV	KAN; 4	CLT; 9	TEX	IOW; 27	GTW; 25	CHI; 7*	KEN; 5	ELD; 7	POC	**MCH**; 3	BRI; 3*	MSP; 2	LVS; 22	TAL; 27	MAR; 30	TEX	PHO; 29	HOM; 7			90th	0^{1}	
2019	NEMCO Motorsports	8	Chevy	DAY	ATL	LVS	MAR	TEX	DOV	KAN	CLT	TEX	IOW	GTW	CHI	KEN	POC	ELD	MCH	BRI; 29	MSP	LVS; 32	TAL; 30	MAR; 7	PHO; 29	HOM			99th	0^{1}	
2020	NEMCO Motorsports	8	Ford	DAY; DNQ	LVS	CLT; 6	ATL; 24	HOM	POC	KEN	TEX	KAN	KAN	MCH; 25	DRC	DOV	GTW	DAR	RCH	BRI	LVS	TAL	KAN	TEX	MAR	PHO			82nd	0^{1}	
2021	Kyle Busch Motorsports	4	Toyota	DAY; 7	DRC; 3	LVS; 1*	ATL; 3	BRD; 39	RCH; 1*	KAN; 5	DAR; 8*	COA; 12	CLT; 1*	TEX; 1*	NSH; 10	POC; 1	KNX; 11	GLN; 2	GTW; 22	DAR; 2	BRI; 3	LVS; 33	TAL; 4	MAR; 39	PHO; 7				3rd	4030	
2022	Kyle Busch Motorsports	4	Toyota	DAY; 24*	**LVS**; 25	ATL; 24	COA; 2	MAR; 4	BRD; 3	**DAR**; 1*	**KAN**; 6	**TEX**; 6	CLT; 3	GTW; 35	SON; 8	KNX; 2	NSH; 9	MOH; 28	POC; 3	**IRP**; 10*	RCH; 2	**KAN**; 1*	BRI; 12	**TAL**; 24	HOM; 35	PHO; 4			5th	2285	
2023	Tricon Garage	17	Toyota	DAY	LVS; 31	ATL; 3*	COA	TEX	BRD	MAR	KAN	DAR	NWS	CLT	GTW	NSH	MOH	POC	RCH	IRP	MLW	KAN	BRI	TAL	HOM	PHO			89th	0^{1}	
2026	Halmar Friesen Racing	62	Toyota	DAY; 5	ATL; 8	STP	DAR	CAR	BRI	TEX	GLN	DOV	CLT	NSH	MCH	COR	LRP	NWS	IRP	RCH									104th	0^{1}	
2026	Tricon Garage	5	Toyota																		NHA; 19	BRI	KAN	CLT	PHO	TAL	MAR	HOM	104th	0^{1}	

^{*} Season still in progress
^{1} Ineligible for series points

=== ARCA Menards Series ===
(key) (Bold – Pole position awarded by qualifying time. Italics – Pole position earned by points standings or practice time. * – Most laps led.)

ARCA Menards Series results
Year	Team	No.	Make	1	2	3	4	5	6	7	8	9	10	11	12	13	14	15	16	17	18	19	20	AMSC	Pts	Ref
2022	Venturini Motorsports	55	Toyota	DAY	PHO	TAL	KAN	CLT	IOW	BLN	ELK	**MOH**; 4*	POC	IRP	MCH	GLN	ISF	MLW	DSF	KAN	BRI	SLM	TOL	72nd	42	

==== K&N Pro Series East ====
NASCAR K&N Pro Series East results
Year	Team	No.	Make	1	2	3	4	5	6	7	8	9	10	11	12	13	14	15	16	NKNPSEC	Pts	Ref
2013	Spraker Racing	37	Chevy	BRI	GRE	FIF; 12														48th	46	
2013	SWM-NEMCO Motorsports	8	Chevy				RCH; 30	BGS	IOW	LGY	COL	IOW	VIR	GRE	NHA	DOV	RAL			48th	46	
2014	SWM-NEMCO Motorsports	8	Toyota	NSM	DAY	BRI	GRE	RCH	IOW	BGS	FIF	LGY	NHA	COL	IOW	GLN; 25	VIR	GRE	DOV	65th	19	

=== CARS Super Late Model Tour ===
(key)

CARS Super Late Model Tour results
Year	Team	No.	Make	1	2	3	4	5	6	7	8	9	10	CSLMTC	Pts	Ref
2015	SWM-NEMCO Motorsports	8N	Chevy	SNM	ROU; 16	HCY	SNM	TCM	MMS	ROU	CON	MYB	HCY	53rd	17	
2016	NEMCO Motorsports	8N	Chevy	SNM	ROU; 16	HCY	TCM	GRE	ROU	CON	MYB	HCY	SNM	57th	17	

=== Sports cars ===
(key) (Bold – Pole position awarded by time. Italics – Pole position earned by points standings. * – Most laps led.)

==== IMSA Michelin Pilot Challenge ====
IMSA Michelin Pilot Challenge results
Year	Team	No.	Car	1	2	3	4	5	6	7	8	9	10	MPC	Pts	Ref
2023	TGR Smooge Racing	23	Toyota GR Supra GT4 Evo	DAY; 19	SEB	LGA	MOH	WGL	MOS	ELK	VIR	IMS	ATL	27th	40	

Sporting positions
Preceded by Tyler Hill	Allison Legacy Series Champion; 2012	Succeeded by Justin Laduke
Preceded by Erik Jones	Snowball Derby Winner; 2014	Succeeded by Chase Elliott
