= 2023 NASCAR Cup Series Championship Race =

Race details
- Race 36 of 36 in the 2023 NASCAR Cup Series
- Date: November 5, 2023
- Location: Phoenix Raceway in Avondale, Arizona
- Course: Permanent racing facility
- Course length: 1 miles (1.6 km)
- Distance: 312 laps, 312 mi (499.2 km)
- Average speed: 108.827 miles per hour (175.140 km/h)

Pole position
Driver	William Byron	Hendrick Motorsports
- Time: 27.150

Most laps led
Driver	Ross Chastain	Trackhouse Racing
- Laps: 157

Winner
No. 1	Ross Chastain	Trackhouse Racing

Television in the United States
- Network: NBC
- Announcers: Rick Allen, Jeff Burton, Steve Letarte and Dale Earnhardt Jr.

Radio in the United States
- Radio: MRN
- Booth announcers: Alex Hayden, Jeff Striegle and Rusty Wallace
- Turn announcers: Dave Moody (1 & 2) and Mike Bagley (3 & 4)

The 2023 NASCAR Cup Series Championship Race was a NASCAR Cup Series race held on November 5, 2023, at Phoenix Raceway in Avondale, Arizona. Contested over 312 laps on the one-mile (1.6 km) oval, it was the 36th and final race of the 2023 NASCAR Cup Series season. Ross Chastain won the race, with Ryan Blaney finishing second and claiming his first Cup Series championship. This was also the final race for both Kevin Harvick and Aric Almirola before their retirements from the Cup Series.

== Report ==
=== Background ===
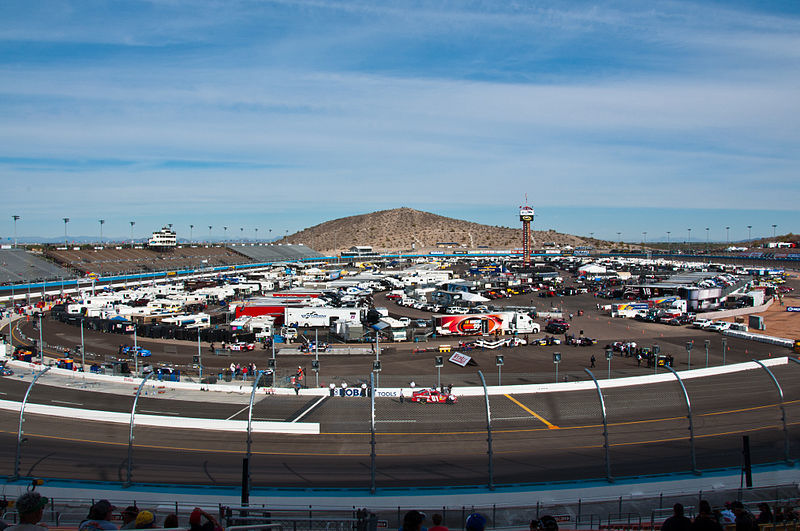
Phoenix Raceway, the track where the race was held.

Phoenix Raceway – also known as PIR – is a one-mile, low-banked tri-oval race track located in Avondale, Arizona. It is named after the nearby metropolitan area of Phoenix. The motorsport track opened in 1964 and currently hosts two NASCAR race weekends annually. PIR has also hosted the IndyCar Series, CART, USAC and the Rolex Sports Car Series. The raceway is currently owned and operated by International Speedway Corporation.

The raceway was originally constructed with a 2.5 mi (4.0 km) road course that ran both inside and outside of the main tri-oval. In 1991 the track was reconfigured with the current 1.51 mi (2.43 km) interior layout. PIR has an estimated grandstand seating capacity of around 67,000. Lights were installed around the track in 2004 following the addition of a second annual NASCAR race weekend.

Phoenix Raceway is home to two annual NASCAR race weekends, one of 13 facilities on the NASCAR schedule to host more than one race weekend a year. The track is both the first and last stop in the western United States, as well as the fourth and the last track on the schedule.

==== Championship drivers ====
- Kyle Larson was the first of four drivers to clinch a spot in the Championship 4, winning the first race of the Round of 8 at Las Vegas.
- Christopher Bell clinched the second spot in the Championship 4, winning the second race of the Round of 8 at Homestead.
- Ryan Blaney clinched the third spot in the Championship 4, winning the third race of the Round of 8 at Martinsville.
- William Byron clinched the final spot in the Championship 4, based on points.

==== Entry list ====
- (R) denotes rookie driver.
- (i) denotes driver who is ineligible for series driver points.
- (CC) denotes championship contender.

No.	Driver	Team	Manufacturer
1	Ross Chastain	Trackhouse Racing	Chevrolet
2	Austin Cindric	Team Penske	Ford
3	Austin Dillon	Richard Childress Racing	Chevrolet
4	Kevin Harvick	Stewart-Haas Racing	Ford
5	Kyle Larson (CC)	Hendrick Motorsports	Chevrolet
6	Brad Keselowski	RFK Racing	Ford
7	Corey LaJoie	Spire Motorsports	Chevrolet
8	Kyle Busch	Richard Childress Racing	Chevrolet
9	Chase Elliott	Hendrick Motorsports	Chevrolet
10	Aric Almirola	Stewart-Haas Racing	Ford
11	Denny Hamlin	Joe Gibbs Racing	Toyota
12	Ryan Blaney (CC)	Team Penske	Ford
14	Chase Briscoe	Stewart-Haas Racing	Ford
15	J. J. Yeley (i)	Rick Ware Racing	Ford
16	A. J. Allmendinger	Kaulig Racing	Chevrolet
17	Chris Buescher	RFK Racing	Ford
19	Martin Truex Jr.	Joe Gibbs Racing	Toyota
20	Christopher Bell (CC)	Joe Gibbs Racing	Toyota
21	Harrison Burton	Wood Brothers Racing	Ford
22	Joey Logano	Team Penske	Ford
23	Bubba Wallace	23XI Racing	Toyota
24	William Byron (CC)	Hendrick Motorsports	Chevrolet
31	Justin Haley	Kaulig Racing	Chevrolet
34	Michael McDowell	Front Row Motorsports	Ford
38	Todd Gilliland	Front Row Motorsports	Ford
41	Ryan Preece	Stewart-Haas Racing	Ford
42	Carson Hocevar (i)	Legacy Motor Club	Chevrolet
43	Erik Jones	Legacy Motor Club	Chevrolet
45	Tyler Reddick	23XI Racing	Toyota
47	Ricky Stenhouse Jr.	JTG Daugherty Racing	Chevrolet
48	Alex Bowman	Hendrick Motorsports	Chevrolet
51	Ryan Newman (i)	Rick Ware Racing	Ford
54	Ty Gibbs (R)	Joe Gibbs Racing	Toyota
77	Ty Dillon	Spire Motorsports	Chevrolet
78	B. J. McLeod (i)	Live Fast Motorsports	Chevrolet
99	Daniel Suárez	Trackhouse Racing	Chevrolet
Official entry list

== Practice ==
Kyle Busch was the fastest in the practice session with a time of 27.520 seconds and a speed of 130.814 mph (210.525 km/h).

=== Practice results ===
Pos	No.	Driver	Team	Manufacturer	Time	Speed
1	8	Kyle Busch	Richard Childress Racing	Chevrolet	27.520	130.814
2	23	Bubba Wallace	23XI Racing	Toyota	27.549	130.676
3	12	Ryan Blaney (CC)	Team Penske	Ford	27.602	130.425
Official practice results

== Qualifying ==
William Byron scored the pole for the race with a time of 27.150 and a speed of 132.597 mph (213.394 km/h).

=== Qualifying results ===
Pos	No.	Driver	Team	Manufacturer	R1	R2
1	24	William Byron (CC)	Hendrick Motorsports	Chevrolet	27.074	27.150
2	19	Martin Truex Jr.	Joe Gibbs Racing	Toyota	27.182	27.168
3	4	Kevin Harvick	Stewart-Haas Racing	Ford	27.067	27.186
4	5	Kyle Larson (CC)	Hendrick Motorsports	Chevrolet	27.149	27.191
5	23	Bubba Wallace	23XI Racing	Toyota	27.130	27.219
6	11	Denny Hamlin	Joe Gibbs Racing	Toyota	27.124	27.244
7	43	Erik Jones	Legacy Motor Club	Chevrolet	27.151	27.368
8	1	Ross Chastain	Trackhouse Racing	Chevrolet	27.106	27.386
9	17	Chris Buescher	RFK Racing	Ford	27.129	27.458
10	45	Tyler Reddick	23XI Racing	Toyota	27.150	27.957
11	54	Ty Gibbs (R)	Joe Gibbs Racing	Toyota	27.181	—
12	41	Ryan Preece	Stewart-Haas Racing	Ford	27.182	—
13	20	Christopher Bell (CC)	Joe Gibbs Racing	Toyota	27.203	—
14	38	Todd Gilliland	Front Row Motorsports	Ford	27.205	—
15	12	Ryan Blaney (CC)	Team Penske	Ford	27.218	—
16	99	Daniel Suárez	Trackhouse Racing	Chevrolet	27.232	—
17	22	Joey Logano	Team Penske	Ford	27.241	—
18	8	Kyle Busch	Richard Childress Racing	Chevrolet	27.246	—
19	34	Michael McDowell	Front Row Motorsports	Ford	27.249	—
20	9	Chase Elliott	Hendrick Motorsports	Chevrolet	27.266	—
21	3	Austin Dillon	Richard Childress Racing	Chevrolet	27.275	—
22	42	Carson Hocevar (i)	Legacy Motor Club	Chevrolet	27.280	—
23	48	Alex Bowman	Hendrick Motorsports	Chevrolet	27.295	—
24	47	Ricky Stenhouse Jr.	JTG Daugherty Racing	Chevrolet	27.316	—
25	21	Harrison Burton	Wood Brothers Racing	Ford	27.421	—
26	14	Chase Briscoe	Stewart-Haas Racing	Ford	27.444	—
27	2	Austin Cindric	Team Penske	Ford	27.446	—
28	10	Aric Almirola	Stewart-Haas Racing	Ford	27.460	—
29	7	Corey LaJoie	Spire Motorsports	Chevrolet	27.557	—
30	51	Ryan Newman (i)	Rick Ware Racing	Ford	27.578	—
31	6	Cole Custer (i) (Note: Cole Custer filled in for Brad Keselowski for Qualifying as Keselowski and his wife, Paige welcomed their third child.)	RFK Racing	Ford	27.582	—
32	16	A. J. Allmendinger	Kaulig Racing	Chevrolet	27.599	—
33	77	Ty Dillon	Spire Motorsports	Chevrolet	27.606	—
34	15	J. J. Yeley (i)	Rick Ware Racing	Ford	27.662	—
35	31	Justin Haley	Kaulig Racing	Chevrolet	28.003	—
36	78	B. J. McLeod (i)	Live Fast Motorsports	Chevrolet	29.248	—
Official qualifying results

== Race ==
- Note: Ryan Blaney, Christopher Bell, Kyle Larson, and William Byron were not eligible for stage points because of their participation in the Championship 4.

=== Race results ===
For the first time since 2013, the final race of the season was not won by the eventual Cup Series Champion. Instead, Trackhouse driver Ross Chastain, who was eliminated in the second round of the playoffs, wound up dominating the second half of the race to take the win, his second of the season and his fourth overall. As Ryan Blaney, who placed second, had the highest finishing position of the drivers who qualified for the Championship 4, he was declared the 2023 NASCAR Cup Series Champion.

==== Stage results ====
Stage One Laps: 60

Pos	No	Driver	Team	Manufacturer	Points
1	24	William Byron (CC)	Hendrick Motorsports	Chevrolet	0
2	4	Kevin Harvick	Stewart-Haas Racing	Ford	9
3	1	Ross Chastain	Trackhouse Racing	Chevrolet	8
4	23	Bubba Wallace	23XI Racing	Toyota	7
5	5	Kyle Larson (CC)	Hendrick Motorsports	Chevrolet	0
6	17	Chris Buescher	RFK Racing	Ford	5
7	19	Martin Truex Jr.	Joe Gibbs Racing	Toyota	4
8	43	Erik Jones	Legacy Motor Club	Chevrolet	3
9	20	Christopher Bell (CC)	Joe Gibbs Racing	Toyota	0
10	12	Ryan Blaney (CC)	Team Penske	Ford	0
Official stage one results

Stage Two Laps: 125

Pos	No	Driver	Team	Manufacturer	Points
1	17	Chris Buescher	RFK Racing	Ford	10
2	1	Ross Chastain	Trackhouse Racing	Chevrolet	9
3	4	Kevin Harvick	Stewart-Haas Racing	Ford	8
4	24	William Byron (CC)	Hendrick Motorsports	Chevrolet	0
5	19	Martin Truex Jr.	Joe Gibbs Racing	Toyota	6
6	12	Ryan Blaney (CC)	Team Penske	Ford	0
7	5	Kyle Larson (CC)	Hendrick Motorsports	Chevrolet	0
8	23	Bubba Wallace	23XI Racing	Toyota	3
9	6	Brad Keselowski	RFK Racing	Ford	2
10	43	Erik Jones	Legacy Motor Club	Chevrolet	1
Official stage two results

=== Final Stage results ===
Stage Three Laps: 127

Pos	Grid	No	Driver	Team	Manufacturer	Laps	Points
1	8	1	Ross Chastain	Trackhouse Racing	Chevrolet	312	57
2	15	12	Ryan Blaney (CC)	Team Penske	Ford	312	35
3	4	5	Kyle Larson (CC)	Hendrick Motorsprots	Chevrolet	312	34
4	1	24	William Byron (CC)	Hendrick Motorsprots	Chevrolet	312	33
5	9	17	Chris Buescher	RFK Racing	Ford	312	47
6	2	19	Martin Truex Jr.	Joe Gibbs Racing	Toyota	312	41
7	3	4	Kevin Harvick	Stewart-Haas Racing	Ford	312	47
8	6	11	Denny Hamlin	Joe Gibbs Racing	Toyota	312	29
9	19	34	Michael McDowell	Front Row Motorsports	Ford	312	28
10	5	23	Bubba Wallace	23XI Racing	Toyota	312	37
11	16	99	Daniel Suárez	Trackhouse Racing	Chevrolet	312	26
12	21	3	Austin Dillon	Richard Childress Racing	Chevrolet	312	25
13	28	10	Aric Almirola	Stewart-Haas Racing	Ford	312	24
14	12	41	Ryan Preece	Stewart-Haas Racing	Ford	312	23
15	31	6	Brad Keselowski	RFK Racing	Ford	312	24
16	20	9	Chase Elliott	Hendrick Motorsports	Chevrolet	312	21
17	23	48	Alex Bowman	Hendrick Motorsports	Chevrolet	312	20
18	17	22	Joey Logano	Team Penske	Ford	312	19
19	22	42	Carson Hocevar (i)	Legacy Motor Club	Chevrolet	312	0
20	7	43	Erik Jones	Legacy Motor Club	Chevrolet	312	21
21	11	54	Ty Gibbs (R)	Joe Gibbs Racing	Toyota	312	16
22	10	45	Tyler Reddick	23XI Racing	Toyota	312	15
23	24	47	Ricky Stenhouse Jr.	JTG Daugherty Racing	Chevrolet	312	14
24	26	14	Chase Briscoe	Stewart-Haas Racing	Ford	312	13
25	18	8	Kyle Busch	Richard Childress Racing	Chevrolet	311	12
26	25	21	Harrison Burton	Wood Brothers Racing	Ford	311	11
27	34	15	J. J. Yeley (i)	Rick Ware Racing	Ford	311	0
28	33	77	Ty Dillon	Spire Motorsports	Chevrolet	310	9
29	35	31	Justin Haley	Kaulig Racing	Chevrolet	310	8
30	14	38	Todd Gilliland	Front Row Motorsports	Ford	309	7
31	29	7	Corey LaJoie	Spire Motorsports	Chevrolet	308	6
32	32	16	A. J. Allmendinger	Kaulig Racing	Chevrolet	308	5
33	36	78	B. J. McLeod (i)	Live Fast Motorsports	Chevrolet	306	0
34	30	51	Ryan Newman (i)	Rick Ware Racing	Ford	305	0
35	27	2	Austin Cindric	Team Penske	Ford	301	2
36	13	20	Christopher Bell (CC)	Joe Gibbs Racing	Toyota	108	1
Official race results

=== Race statistics ===
- Lead changes: 18 among 8 different drivers
- Cautions/Laps: 4 for 27 laps
- Red flags: 0
- Time of race: 2 hours, 52 minutes, and 1 second
- Average speed: 108.827 miles per hour (175.140 km/h)

== Media ==
=== Television ===
NBC covered the race on the television side. Rick Allen, two–time Phoenix winner Jeff Burton, Steve Letarte and three-time Phoenix winner Dale Earnhardt Jr. called the race from the broadcast booth. Dave Burns, Kim Coon, Parker Kligerman and Marty Snider handled the pit road duties from pit lane.

NBC
Booth announcers	Pit reporters
Lap-by-lap: Rick Allen; Color-commentator: Jeff Burton; Color-commentator: Steve Letarte; Color-commentator: Dale Earnhardt Jr.	Dave Burns; Kim Coon; Parker Kligerman; Marty Snider

=== Radio ===
MRN had the radio call for the race, which was also simulcast on Sirius XM NASCAR Radio. Alex Hayden, Jeff Striegle and Rusty Wallace called the action from the broadcast booth when the field races down the front straightaway. Dave Moody called the action from turns 1 & 2 and Mike Bagley called the action from turns 3 & 4. Steve Post, Jacklyn Drake, Jason Toy, and Chris Wilner covered the action for MRN from pit lane.

MRN Radio
Booth announcers	Turn announcers	Pit reporters
Lead announcer: Alex Hayden; Announcer: Jeff Striegle; Announcer: Rusty Wallace	Turns 1 & 2: Dave Moody; Turns 3 & 4: Mike Bagley	Steve Post; Jacklyn Drake; Jason Toy; Chris Wilner

== Standings after the race ==
Drivers' Championship standings

	Pos	Driver	Points
	1	Ryan Blaney	5,035
1	2	Kyle Larson	5,034 (–1)
1	3	William Byron	5,033 (–2)
2	4	Christopher Bell	5,001 (–34)
	5	Denny Hamlin	2,383 (–2,652)
	6	Tyler Reddick	2,344 (–2,691)
1	7	Chris Buescher	2,310 (–2,725)
1	8	Brad Keselowski	2,302 (–2,733)
	9	Ross Chastain	2,299 (–2,736)
	10	Bubba Wallace	2,279 (–2,756)
1	11	Martin Truex Jr.	2,269 (–2,766)
1	12	Joey Logano	2,258 (–2,777)
1	13	Kevin Harvick	2,241 (–2,794)
1	14	Kyle Busch	2,232 (–2,803)
	15	Michael McDowell	2,185 (–2,850)
	16	Ricky Stenhouse Jr.	2,168 (–2,867)
Official driver's standings

Manufacturers' Championship standings

Pos	Manufacturer	Points
1	Chevrolet	1,329
2	Toyota	1,249 (–80)
3	Ford	1,240 (–89)

- Note: Only the first 16 positions are included for the driver standings.

== Notes ==
Previous race: 2023 Xfinity 500	NASCAR Cup Series; 2023 season	Next race: 2024 Daytona 500
