= 2023 Xfinity 500 =

Race details
- Race 35 of 36 in the 2023 NASCAR Cup Series
- Date: October 29, 2023
- Location: Martinsville Speedway in Ridgeway, Virginia
- Course: Permanent racing facility
- Course length: .526 miles (.847 km)
- Distance: 500 laps, 263 mi (423.5 km)
- Average speed: 75.244 miles per hour (121.093 km/h)

Pole position
Driver	Martin Truex Jr.	Joe Gibbs Racing
- Time: 20.112

Most laps led
Driver	Denny Hamlin	Joe Gibbs Racing
- Laps: 156

Winner
No. 12	Ryan Blaney	Team Penske

Television in the United States
- Network: NBC
- Announcers: Rick Allen, Jeff Burton, Steve Letarte and Dale Earnhardt Jr.

Radio in the United States
- Radio: MRN
- Booth announcers: Alex Hayden, Jeff Striegle and Rusty Wallace
- Turn announcers: Dave Moody (Backstretch)

The 2023 Xfinity 500 was a NASCAR Cup Series race held on October 29, 2023, at Martinsville Speedway in Ridgeway, Virginia. Contested over 500 laps on the .526 mile (.847 km) short track, it was the 35th race of the 2023 NASCAR Cup Series season, the ninth race of the Playoffs, and final race of the Round of 8.

== Report ==
=== Background ===
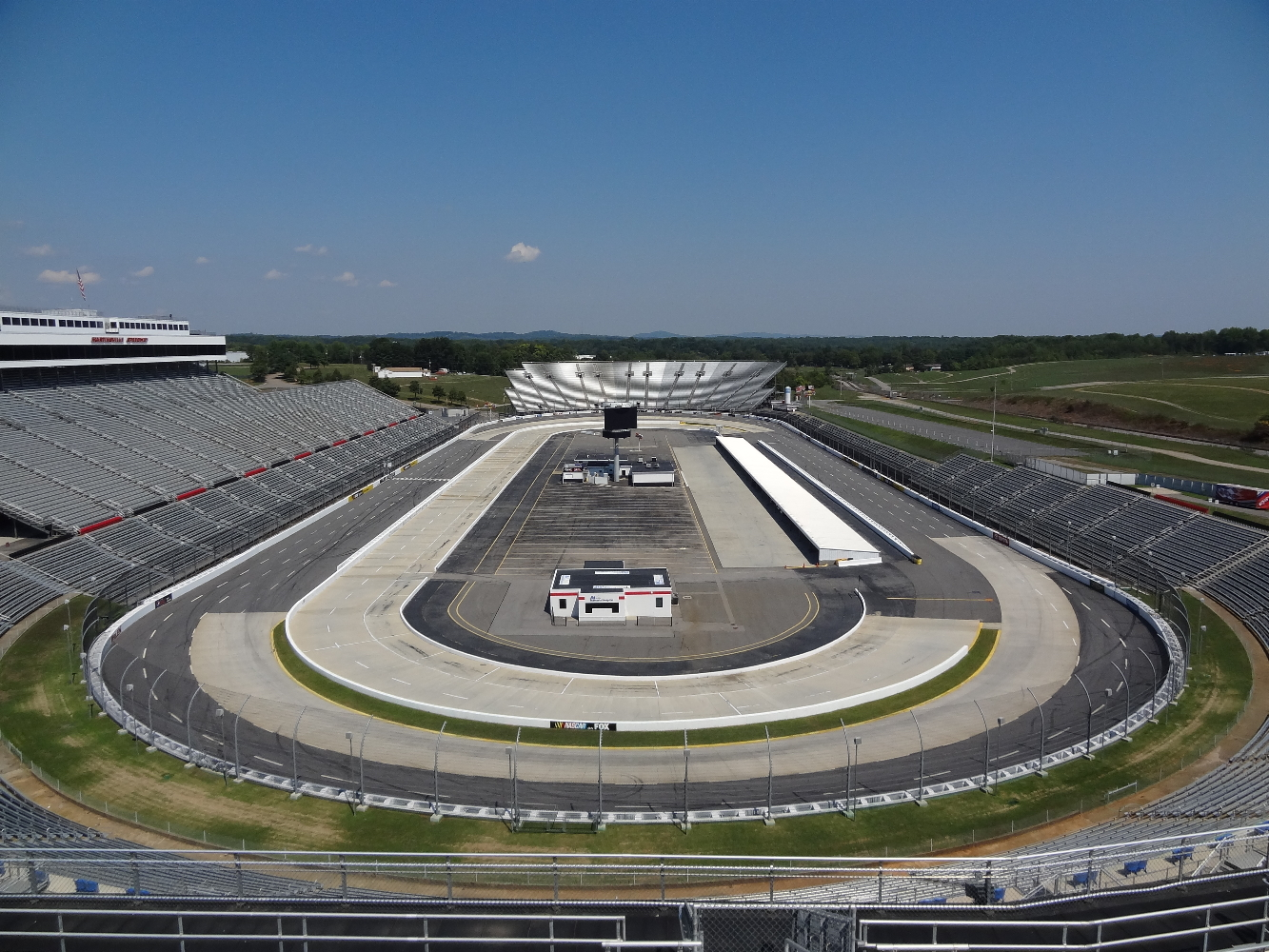
Martinsville Speedway, the track where the race was held.

Martinsville Speedway is an International Speedway Corporation-owned NASCAR stock car racing track located in Henry County, in Ridgeway, Virginia, just to the south of Martinsville. At 0.526 miles (0.847 km) in length, it is the shortest track in the NASCAR Cup Series. The track is also one of the first paved oval tracks in NASCAR, being built in 1947 by H. Clay Earles. It is also the only race track that has been on the NASCAR circuit from its beginning in 1948. Along with this, Martinsville is the only NASCAR oval track on the entire NASCAR track circuit to have asphalt surfaces on the straightaways, then concrete to cover the turns.

==== Entry list ====
- (R) denotes rookie driver.
- (i) denotes driver who is ineligible for series driver points.
- (P) denotes playoff driver.
- (OP) denotes owner's playoffs car.

No.	Driver	Team	Manufacturer
1	Ross Chastain	Trackhouse Racing	Chevrolet
2	Austin Cindric	Team Penske	Ford
3	Austin Dillon	Richard Childress Racing	Chevrolet
4	Kevin Harvick	Stewart-Haas Racing	Ford
5	Kyle Larson (P)	Hendrick Motorsports	Chevrolet
6	Brad Keselowski	RFK Racing	Ford
7	Corey LaJoie	Spire Motorsports	Chevrolet
8	Kyle Busch	Richard Childress Racing	Chevrolet
9	Chase Elliott (OP)	Hendrick Motorsports	Chevrolet
10	Aric Almirola	Stewart-Haas Racing	Ford
11	Denny Hamlin (P)	Joe Gibbs Racing	Toyota
12	Ryan Blaney (P)	Team Penske	Ford
14	Chase Briscoe	Stewart-Haas Racing	Ford
15	J. J. Yeley (i)	Rick Ware Racing	Ford
16	A. J. Allmendinger	Kaulig Racing	Chevrolet
17	Chris Buescher (P)	RFK Racing	Ford
19	Martin Truex Jr. (P)	Joe Gibbs Racing	Toyota
20	Christopher Bell (P)	Joe Gibbs Racing	Toyota
21	Harrison Burton	Wood Brothers Racing	Ford
22	Joey Logano	Team Penske	Ford
23	Bubba Wallace	23XI Racing	Toyota
24	William Byron (P)	Hendrick Motorsports	Chevrolet
31	Justin Haley	Kaulig Racing	Chevrolet
34	Michael McDowell	Front Row Motorsports	Ford
38	Todd Gilliland	Front Row Motorsports	Ford
41	Ryan Preece	Stewart-Haas Racing	Ford
42	Carson Hocevar (i)	Legacy Motor Club	Chevrolet
43	Erik Jones	Legacy Motor Club	Chevrolet
45	Tyler Reddick (P)	23XI Racing	Toyota
47	Ricky Stenhouse Jr.	JTG Daugherty Racing	Chevrolet
48	Alex Bowman	Hendrick Motorsports	Chevrolet
51	Ryan Newman (i)	Rick Ware Racing	Ford
54	Ty Gibbs (R)	Joe Gibbs Racing	Toyota
77	Ty Dillon	Spire Motorsports	Chevrolet
78	B. J. McLeod (i)	Live Fast Motorsports	Chevrolet
99	Daniel Suárez	Trackhouse Racing	Chevrolet
Official entry list

== Practice ==
Denny Hamlin was the fastest in the practice session with a time of 20.160 seconds and a speed of 93.929 mph (151.164 km/h).

=== Practice results ===
Pos	No.	Driver	Team	Manufacturer	Time	Speed
1	11	Denny Hamlin (P)	Joe Gibbs Racing	Toyota	20.160	93.929
2	7	Corey LaJoie	Spire Motorsports	Chevrolet	20.199	93.747
3	24	William Byron (P)	Hendrick Motorsports	Chevrolet	20.210	93.696
Official practice results

== Qualifying ==
Martin Truex Jr. scored the pole for the race with a time of 20.112 and a speed of 94.153 mph (151.525 km/h).

=== Qualifying results ===
Pos	No.	Driver	Team	Manufacturer	R1	R2
1	19	Martin Truex Jr. (P)	Joe Gibbs Racing	Toyota	20.018	20.112
2	54	Ty Gibbs (R)	Joe Gibbs Racing	Toyota	20.021	20.120
3	14	Chase Briscoe	Stewart-Haas Racing	Ford	20.080	20.122
4	11	Denny Hamlin (P)	Joe Gibbs Racing	Toyota	20.054	20.133
5	5	Kyle Larson (P)	Hendrick Motorsports	Chevrolet	20.034	20.176
6	23	Bubba Wallace	23XI Racing	Toyota	20.236	20.191
7	20	Christopher Bell (P)	Joe Gibbs Racing	Toyota	20.156	20.208
8	4	Kevin Harvick	Stewart-Haas Racing	Ford	20.240	20.242
9	41	Ryan Preece	Stewart-Haas Racing	Ford	20.102	20.242
10	6	Brad Keselowski	RFK Racing	Ford	20.215	20.269
11	12	Ryan Blaney (P)	Team Penske	Ford	20.172	—
12	10	Aric Almirola	Stewart-Haas Racing	Ford	20.182	—
13	1	Ross Chastain	Trackhouse Racing	Chevrolet	20.185	—
14	9	Chase Elliott (OP)	Hendrick Motorsports	Chevrolet	20.193	—
15	22	Joey Logano	Team Penske	Ford	20.211	—
16	24	William Byron (P)	Hendrick Motorsports	Chevrolet	20.261	—
17	38	Todd Gilliland	Front Row Motorsports	Ford	20.270	—
18	17	Chris Buescher (P)	RFK Racing	Ford	20.274	—
19	45	Tyler Reddick (P)	23XI Racing	Toyota	20.287	—
20	47	Ricky Stenhouse Jr.	JTG Daugherty Racing	Chevrolet	20.308	—
21	2	Austin Cindric	Team Penske	Ford	20.310	—
22	48	Alex Bowman	Hendrick Motorsports	Chevrolet	20.317	—
23	34	Michael McDowell	Front Row Motorsports	Ford	20.329	—
24	31	Justin Haley	Kaulig Racing	Chevrolet	20.332	—
25	16	A. J. Allmendinger	Kaulig Racing	Chevrolet	20.373	—
26	3	Austin Dillon	Richard Childress Racing	Chevrolet	20.387	—
27	99	Daniel Suárez	Trackhouse Racing	Chevrolet	20.390	—
28	21	Harrison Burton	Wood Brothers Racing	Ford	20.399	—
29	43	Erik Jones	Legacy Motor Club	Chevrolet	20.424	—
30	7	Corey LaJoie	Spire Motorsports	Chevrolet	20.443	—
31	8	Kyle Busch	Richard Childress Racing	Chevrolet	20.445	—
32	42	Carson Hocevar (i)	Legacy Motor Club	Chevrolet	20.540	—
33	51	Ryan Newman	Rick Ware Racing	Ford	20.551	—
34	77	Ty Dillon	Spire Motorsports	Chevrolet	20.557	—
35	15	J. J. Yeley (i)	Rick Ware Racing	Ford	20.639	—
36	78	B. J. McLeod (i)	Live Fast Motorsports	Chevrolet	20.659	—
Official qualifying results

== Race ==
=== Race results ===
==== Stage results ====
Stage One Laps: 130

Pos	No	Driver	Team	Manufacturer	Points
1	11	Denny Hamlin (P)	Joe Gibbs Racing	Toyota	10
2	12	Ryan Blaney (P)	Team Penske	Ford	9
3	19	Martin Truex Jr. (P)	Joe Gibbs Racing	Toyota	8
4	14	Chase Briscoe	Stewart-Haas Racing	Ford	7
5	6	Brad Keselowski	RFK Racing	Ford	6
6	20	Christopher Bell (P)	Joe Gibbs Racing	Toyota	5
7	54	Ty Gibbs (R)	Joe Gibbs Racing	Toyota	4
8	41	Ryan Preece	Stewart-Haas Racing	Ford	3
9	22	Joey Logano	Team Penske	Ford	2
10	4	Kevin Harvick	Stewart-Haas Racing	Ford	1
Official stage one results

Stage Two Laps: 130

Pos	No	Driver	Team	Manufacturer	Points
1	12	Ryan Blaney (P)	Team Penske	Ford	10
2	11	Denny Hamlin (P)	Joe Gibbs Racing	Toyota	9
3	14	Chase Briscoe	Stewart-Haas Racing	Ford	8
4	22	Joey Logano	Team Penske	Ford	7
5	6	Brad Keselowski	RFK Racing	Ford	6
6	54	Ty Gibbs (R)	Joe Gibbs Racing	Toyota	5
7	41	Ryan Preece	Stewart-Haas Racing	Ford	4
8	38	Todd Gilliland	Front Row Motorsports	Ford	3
9	4	Kevin Harvick	Stewart-Haas Racing	Ford	2
10	20	Christopher Bell (P)	Joe Gibbs Racing	Toyota	1
Official stage two results

=== Final Stage results ===
Stage Three Laps: 240

Pos	Grid	No	Driver	Team	Manufacturer	Laps	Points
1	11	12	Ryan Blaney (P)	Team Penske	Ford	500	59
2	12	10	Aric Almirola	Stewart-Haas Racing	Ford	500	35
3	4	11	Denny Hamlin (P)	Joe Gibbs Racing	Toyota	500	53
4	3	14	Chase Briscoe	Stewart-Haas Racing	Ford	500	48
5	15	22	Joey Logano	Team Penske	Ford	500	41
6	5	5	Kyle Larson (P)	Hendrick Motorsports	Chevrolet	500	31
7	7	20	Christopher Bell (P)	Joe Gibbs Racing	Toyota	500	36
8	18	17	Chris Buescher (P)	RFK Racing	Ford	500	29
9	21	2	Austin Cindric	Team Penske	Ford	500	28
10	17	38	Todd Gilliland	Front Row Motorsports	Ford	500	30
11	6	23	Bubba Wallace	23XI Racing	Toyota	500	26
12	1	19	Martin Truex Jr. (P)	Joe Gibbs Racing	Toyota	500	33
13	16	24	William Byron (P)	Hendrick Motorsports	Chevrolet	499	24
14	13	1	Ross Chastain	Trackhouse Racing	Chevrolet	499	23
15	28	21	Harrison Burton	Wood Brothers Racing	Ford	499	22
16	8	4	Kevin Harvick	Stewart-Haas Racing	Ford	499	24
17	14	9	Chase Elliott (OP)	Hendrick Motorsports	Chevrolet	499	20
18	2	54	Ty Gibbs (R)	Joe Gibbs Racing	Toyota	499	28
19	20	47	Ricky Stenhouse Jr.	JTG Daugherty Racing	Chevrolet	499	18
20	9	41	Ryan Preece	Stewart-Haas Racing	Ford	499	24
21	29	43	Erik Jones	Legacy Motor Club	Chevrolet	499	16
22	30	7	Corey LaJoie	Spire Motorsports	Chevrolet	499	15
23	26	3	Austin Dillon	Richard Childress Racing	Chevrolet	499	14
24	34	77	Ty Dillon	Spire Motorsports	Chevrolet	499	13
25	23	34	Michael McDowell	Front Row Motorsports	Ford	499	12
26	19	45	Tyler Reddick (P)	23XI Racing	Toyota	498	11
27	31	8	Kyle Busch	Richard Childress Racing	Chevrolet	498	10
28	25	16	A. J. Allmendinger	Kaulig Racing	Chevrolet	498	9
29	33	51	Ryan Newman	Rick Ware Racing	Ford	497	8
30	24	31	Justin Haley	Kaulig Racing	Chevrolet	497	7
31	32	42	Carson Hocevar (i)	Legacy Motor Club	Chevrolet	496	0
32	22	48	Alex Bowman	Hendrick Motorsports	Chevrolet	496	5
33	10	6	Brad Keselowski	RFK Racing	Ford	305	16
34	27	99	Daniel Suárez	Trackhouse Racing	Chevrolet	274	3
35	35	15	J. J. Yeley (i)	Rick Ware Racing	Ford	271	0
36	36	78	B. J. McLeod (i)	Live Fast Motorsports	Chevrolet	148	0
Official race results

=== Race statistics ===
- Lead changes: 12 among 6 different drivers
- Cautions/Laps: 7 for 61 laps
- Red flags: 0
- Time of race: 3 hours, 29 minutes, and 43 seconds
- Average speed: 75.244 miles per hour (121.093 km/h)

== Media ==
=== Television ===
NBC covered the race on the television side. Rick Allen, 1997 race winner Jeff Burton, Steve Letarte and 2014 race winner Dale Earnhardt Jr. called the race from the broadcast booth. Dave Burns, Kim Coon, Parker Kligerman and Marty Snider handled the pit road duties from pit lane.

NBC
Booth announcers	Pit reporters
Lap-by-lap: Rick Allen; Color-commentator: Jeff Burton; Color-commentator: Steve Letarte; Color-commentator: Dale Earnhardt Jr.	Dave Burns; Kim Coon; Parker Kligerman; Marty Snider

=== Radio ===
MRN had the radio call for the race, which was also simulcast on Sirius XM NASCAR Radio. Alex Hayden, Jeff Striegle and 7 time Martinsville winner Rusty Wallace have the call for MRN when the field raced down the front straightaway. Dave Moody covers the action for MRN when the field races down the backstraightway into turn 3. Steve Post, Jacklyn Drake, and Chris Wilner covered action for MRN from pit lane.

MRN
Booth announcers	Turn announcers	Pit reporters
Lead announcer: Alex Hayden; Announcer: Jeff Striegle; Announcer: Rusty Wallace	Backstretch: Dave Moody	Steve Post; Jacklyn Drake; Chris Wilner

== Standings after the race ==
Drivers' Championship standings

	Pos	Driver	Points
2	1	Ryan Blaney	5,000
	2	Christopher Bell	5,000 (–0)
1	3	Kyle Larson	5,000 (–0)
3	4	William Byron	5,000 (–0)
2	5	Denny Hamlin	2,354 (–2,646)
1	6	Tyler Reddick	2,329 (–2,671)
2	7	Brad Keselowski	2,278 (–2,722)
	8	Chris Buescher	2,263 (–2,737)
1	9	Ross Chastain	2,242 (–2,758)
1	10	Bubba Wallace	2,242 (–2,758)
2	11	Joey Logano	2,239 (–2,761)
6	12	Martin Truex Jr.	2,228 (–2,772)
1	13	Kyle Busch	2,220 (–2,780)
	14	Kevin Harvick	2,194 (–2,806)
	15	Michael McDowell	2,157 (–2,843)
	16	Ricky Stenhouse Jr.	2,154 (–2,846)
Official driver's standings

Manufacturers' Championship standings

Pos	Manufacturer	Points
1	Chevrolet	1,289
2	Toyota	1,218 (–71)
3	Ford	1,205 (–84)

- Note: Only the first 16 positions are included for the driver standings.

Previous race: 2023 4EVER 400	NASCAR Cup Series; 2023 season	Next race: 2023 NASCAR Cup Series Championship Race
