= 2023 4EVER 400 =

2023 4EVER 400 Presented by Mobil 1
Race details
- Race 34 of 36 in the 2023 NASCAR Cup Series
- Date: October 22, 2023
- Location: Homestead-Miami Speedway in Homestead, Florida
- Course: Permanent racing facility
- Course length: 1.5 miles (2.4 km)
- Distance: 267 laps, 400.5 mi (640.8 km)
- Average speed: 125.221 miles per hour (201.524 km/h)

Pole position
Driver	Martin Truex Jr.	Joe Gibbs Racing
- Time: 32.256

Most laps led
Driver	Kyle Larson	Hendrick Motorsports
- Laps: 96

Winner
No. 20	Christopher Bell	Joe Gibbs Racing

Television in the United States
- Network: NBC
- Announcers: Rick Allen, Jeff Burton, Steve Letarte and Dale Earnhardt Jr.

Radio in the United States
- Radio: MRN
- Booth announcers: Alex Hayden, Jeff Striegle and Todd Gordon
- Turn announcers: Dave Moody (1 & 2) and Mike Bagley (3 & 4)

The 2023 4EVER 400 Presented by Mobil 1 was a NASCAR Cup Series race held on October 22, 2023, at Homestead-Miami Speedway in Homestead, Florida. Contested over 267 laps on the 1.5 mile (2.4 km) oval, it was the 34th race of the 2023 NASCAR Cup Series season, the eighth race of the Playoffs, and the second race of the Round of 8.

== Report ==
=== Background ===
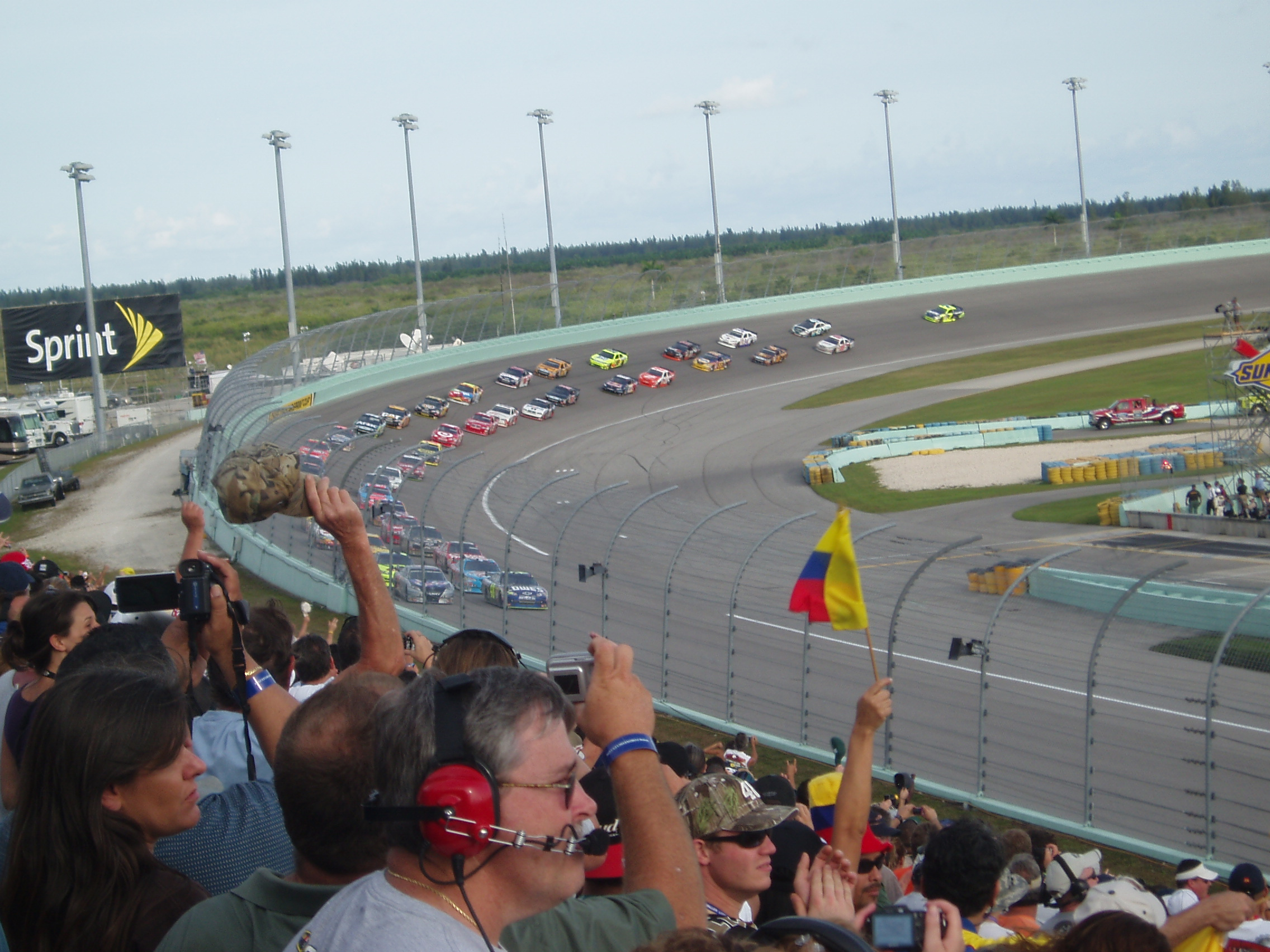
Homestead-Miami Speedway, the track where the race was held.

Homestead-Miami Speedway is a motor racing track located in Homestead, Florida. The track, which has several configurations, has promoted several series of racing, including NASCAR, the NTT IndyCar Series and the Grand-Am Rolex Sports Car Series.

From 2002 to 2019, Homestead-Miami Speedway hosted the final race of the season in all three of NASCAR's series: the NASCAR Cup Series, Xfinity Series and Craftsman Truck Series; due to Ford Motor Company sponsoring all three races the weekend was known as the 'Ford Championship Weekend'. The track has since held races on different dates in 2020 (June) and 2021 (February), which were both effected by the COVID-19 pandemic, before being moved back into the Playoffs as the second race of the Round of 8 in 2022, with the date being kept for 2023.

In 2023, it was announced that Mobil 1 would be replacing Dixie Vodka as the race's sponsor after two years. Mobil 1 would then proceed to name the race after Kevin Harvick and his 4EVER appreciation campaign, as he would be set to retire from NASCAR after the 2023 season.

This race would be the second year straight in a row John Hunter Nemechek would make his one-off Cup start at the same track.

==== Entry list ====
- (R) denotes rookie driver.
- (i) denotes driver who is ineligible for series driver points.
- (P) denotes playoff driver.
- (OP) denotes owner's playoffs car.

No.	Driver	Team	Manufacturer
1	Ross Chastain	Trackhouse Racing	Chevrolet
2	Austin Cindric	Team Penske	Ford
3	Austin Dillon	Richard Childress Racing	Chevrolet
4	Kevin Harvick	Stewart-Haas Racing	Ford
5	Kyle Larson (P)	Hendrick Motorsports	Chevrolet
6	Brad Keselowski	RFK Racing	Ford
7	Corey LaJoie	Spire Motorsports	Chevrolet
8	Kyle Busch	Richard Childress Racing	Chevrolet
9	Chase Elliott (OP)	Hendrick Motorsports	Chevrolet
10	Aric Almirola	Stewart-Haas Racing	Ford
11	Denny Hamlin (P)	Joe Gibbs Racing	Toyota
12	Ryan Blaney (P)	Team Penske	Ford
14	Chase Briscoe	Stewart-Haas Racing	Ford
15	J. J. Yeley (i)	Rick Ware Racing	Ford
16	A. J. Allmendinger	Kaulig Racing	Chevrolet
17	Chris Buescher (P)	RFK Racing	Ford
19	Martin Truex Jr. (P)	Joe Gibbs Racing	Toyota
20	Christopher Bell (P)	Joe Gibbs Racing	Toyota
21	Harrison Burton	Wood Brothers Racing	Ford
22	Joey Logano	Team Penske	Ford
23	Bubba Wallace	23XI Racing	Toyota
24	William Byron (P)	Hendrick Motorsports	Chevrolet
31	Justin Haley	Kaulig Racing	Chevrolet
34	Michael McDowell	Front Row Motorsports	Ford
38	Todd Gilliland	Front Row Motorsports	Ford
41	Ryan Preece	Stewart-Haas Racing	Ford
42	John Hunter Nemechek (i)	Legacy Motor Club	Chevrolet
43	Erik Jones	Legacy Motor Club	Chevrolet
45	Tyler Reddick (P)	23XI Racing	Toyota
47	Ricky Stenhouse Jr.	JTG Daugherty Racing	Chevrolet
48	Alex Bowman	Hendrick Motorsports	Chevrolet
51	Ryan Newman (i)	Rick Ware Racing	Ford
54	Ty Gibbs (R)	Joe Gibbs Racing	Toyota
77	Ty Dillon	Spire Motorsports	Chevrolet
78	Josh Bilicki (i)	Live Fast Motorsports	Chevrolet
99	Daniel Suárez	Trackhouse Racing	Chevrolet
Official entry list

== Practice ==
Bubba Wallace was the fastest in the practice session with a time of 31.936 seconds and a speed of 169.088 mph (272.121 km/h).

=== Practice results ===
Pos	No.	Driver	Team	Manufacturer	Time	Speed
1	23	Bubba Wallace	23XI Racing	Toyota	31.936	169.088
2	2	Austin Cindric	Team Penske	Ford	32.143	167.999
3	12	Ryan Blaney (P)	Team Penske	Ford	32.188	167.764
Official practice results

== Qualifying ==
Martin Truex Jr. scored the pole for the race with a time of 32.256 and a speed of 167.411 mph (269.422 km/h).

=== Qualifying results ===
Pos	No.	Driver	Team	Manufacturer	R1	R2
1	19	Martin Truex Jr. (P)	Joe Gibbs Racing	Toyota	31.999	32.256
2	23	Bubba Wallace	23XI Racing	Toyota	31.888	32.313
3	45	Tyler Reddick (P)	23XI Racing	Toyota	32.003	32.334
4	6	Brad Keselowski	RFK Racing	Ford	32.104	32.417
5	5	Kyle Larson (P)	Hendrick Motorsports	Chevrolet	32.258	32.510
6	3	Austin Dillon	Richard Childress Racing	Chevrolet	32.109	32.551
7	24	William Byron (P)	Hendrick Motorsports	Chevrolet	32.193	32.559
8	1	Ross Chastain	Trackhouse Racing	Chevrolet	32.285	32.563
9	54	Ty Gibbs (R)	Joe Gibbs Racing	Toyota	32.106	32.566
10	12	Ryan Blaney (P)	Team Penske	Ford	32.135	32.594
11	11	Denny Hamlin (P)	Joe Gibbs Racing	Toyota	32.146	—
12	48	Alex Bowman	Hendrick Motorsports	Chevrolet	32.169	—
13	20	Christopher Bell (P)	Joe Gibbs Racing	Toyota	32.184	—
14	99	Daniel Suárez	Trackhouse Racing	Chevrolet	32.221	—
15	34	Michael McDowell	Front Row Motorsports	Ford	32.256	—
16	9	Chase Elliott (OP)	Hendrick Motorsports	Chevrolet	32.318	—
17	17	Chris Buescher (P)	RFK Racing	Ford	32.341	—
18	8	Kyle Busch	Richard Childress Racing	Chevrolet	32.345	—
19	43	Erik Jones	Legacy Motor Club	Chevrolet	32.357	—
20	7	Corey LaJoie	Spire Motorsports	Chevrolet	32.359	—
21	14	Chase Briscoe	Stewart-Haas Racing	Ford	32.389	—
22	4	Kevin Harvick	Stewart-Haas Racing	Ford	32.392	—
23	47	Ricky Stenhouse Jr.	JTG Daugherty Racing	Chevrolet	32.395	—
24	42	John Hunter Nemechek (i)	Legacy Motor Club	Chevrolet	32.399	—
25	16	A. J. Allmendinger	Kaulig Racing	Chevrolet	32.427	—
26	2	Austin Cindric	Team Penske	Ford	32.445	—
27	31	Justin Haley	Kaulig Racing	Chevrolet	32.468	—
28	21	Harrison Burton	Wood Brothers Racing	Ford	32.474	—
29	41	Ryan Preece	Stewart-Haas Racing	Ford	32.513	—
30	10	Aric Almirola	Stewart-Haas Racing	Ford	32.537	—
31	15	J. J. Yeley (i)	Rick Ware Racing	Ford	32.584	—
32	38	Todd Gilliland	Front Row Motorsports	Ford	32.594	—
33	77	Ty Dillon	Spire Motorsports	Chevrolet	32.820	—
34	51	Ryan Newman (i)	Rick Ware Racing	Ford	32.850	—
35	78	Josh Bilicki (i)	Live Fast Motorsports	Chevrolet	33.364	—
36	22	Joey Logano	Team Penske	Ford	0.000	—
Official qualifying results

== Race ==
=== Race results ===
==== Stage results ====
Stage One Laps: 80

Pos	No	Driver	Team	Manufacturer	Points
1	5	Kyle Larson (P)	Hendrick Motorsports	Chevrolet	10
2	6	Brad Keselowski	RFK Racing	Ford	9
3	12	Ryan Blaney (P)	Team Penske	Ford	8
4	24	William Byron (P)	Hendrick Motorsports	Chevrolet	7
5	19	Martin Truex Jr. (P)	Joe Gibbs Racing	Toyota	6
6	11	Denny Hamlin (P)	Joe Gibbs Racing	Toyota	5
7	45	Tyler Reddick (P)	23XI Racing	Toyota	4
8	3	Austin Dillon	Richard Childress Racing	Chevrolet	3
9	20	Christopher Bell (P)	Joe Gibbs Racing	Toyota	2
10	54	Ty Gibbs (R)	Joe Gibbs Racing	Toyota	1
Official stage one results

Stage Two Laps: 85

Pos	No	Driver	Team	Manufacturer	Points
1	12	Ryan Blaney (P)	Team Penske	Ford	10
2	24	William Byron (P)	Hendrick Motorsports	Chevrolet	9
3	5	Kyle Larson (P)	Hendrick Motorsports	Chevrolet	8
4	11	Denny Hamlin (P)	Joe Gibbs Racing	Toyota	7
5	6	Brad Keselowski	RFK Racing	Ford	6
6	19	Martin Truex Jr. (P)	Joe Gibbs Racing	Toyota	5
7	45	Tyler Reddick (P)	23XI Racing	Toyota	4
8	54	Ty Gibbs (R)	Joe Gibbs Racing	Toyota	3
9	3	Austin Dillon	Richard Childress Racing	Chevrolet	2
10	22	Joey Logano	Team Penske	Ford	1
Official stage two results

=== Final Stage results ===
Stage Three Laps: 102

Pos	Grid	No	Driver	Team	Manufacturer	Laps	Points
1	13	20	Christopher Bell (P)	Joe Gibbs Racing	Toyota	267	42
2	10	12	Ryan Blaney (P)	Team Penske	Ford	267	53
3	3	45	Tyler Reddick (P)	23XI Racing	Toyota	267	42
4	7	24	William Byron (P)	Hendrick Motorsports	Chevrolet	267	49
5	25	16	A. J. Allmendinger	Kaulig Racing	Chevrolet	267	32
6	2	23	Bubba Wallace	23XI Racing	Toyota	267	31
7	9	54	Ty Gibbs (R)	Joe Gibbs Racing	Toyota	267	34
8	36	22	Joey Logano	Team Penske	Ford	267	30
9	30	10	Aric Almirola	Stewart-Haas Racing	Ford	267	28
10	6	3	Austin Dillon	Richard Childress Racing	Chevrolet	267	32
11	20	4	Kevin Harvick	Stewart-Haas Racing	Ford	267	26
12	26	2	Austin Cindric	Team Penske	Ford	267	25
13	29	41	Ryan Preece	Stewart-Haas Racing	Ford	267	24
14	18	43	Erik Jones	Legacy Motor Club	Chevrolet	267	23
15	16	9	Chase Elliott (OP)	Hendrick Motorsports	Chevrolet	267	22
16	14	99	Daniel Suárez	Trackhouse Racing	Chevrolet	267	21
17	23	14	Chase Briscoe	Stewart-Haas Racing	Ford	267	20
18	22	8	Kyle Busch	Richard Childress Racing	Chevrolet	267	19
19	12	48	Alex Bowman	Hendrick Motorsports	Chevrolet	267	18
20	19	7	Corey LaJoie	Spire Motorsports	Chevrolet	267	17
21	17	17	Chris Buescher (P)	RFK Racing	Ford	267	16
22	15	34	Michael McDowell	Front Row Motorsports	Ford	267	15
23	27	31	Justin Haley	Kaulig Racing	Chevrolet	267	14
24	33	77	Ty Dillon	Spire Motorsports	Chevrolet	266	13
25	32	38	Todd Gilliland	Front Row Motorsports	Ford	266	12
26	34	51	Ryan Newman (i)	Rick Ware Racing	Ford	265	0
27	24	47	Ricky Stenhouse Jr.	JTG Daugherty Racing	Chevrolet	263	10
28	4	6	Brad Keselowski	RFK Racing	Ford	262	24
29	1	19	Martin Truex Jr. (P)	Joe Gibbs Racing	Toyota	237	19
30	11	11	Denny Hamlin (P)	Joe Gibbs Racing	Toyota	236	19
31	8	1	Ross Chastain	Trackhouse Racing	Chevrolet	221	6
32	21	42	John Hunter Nemechek (i)	Legacy Motor Club	Chevrolet	218	0
33	31	15	J. J. Yeley (i)	Rick Ware Racing	Ford	218	0
34	5	5	Kyle Larson (P)	Hendrick Motorsports	Chevrolet	214	21
35	35	78	Josh Bilicki (i)	Live Fast Motorsports	Chevrolet	201	0
36	28	21	Harrison Burton	Wood Brothers Racing	Ford	165	1
Official race results

=== Race statistics ===
- Lead changes: 25 among 9 different drivers
- Cautions/Laps: 5 for 35 laps
- Red flags: 1 for 12 minutes, and 35 seconds
- Time of race: 3 hours, 11 minutes, and 54 seconds
- Average speed: 125.221 miles per hour (201.524 km/h)

== Media ==
=== Television ===
NBC covered the race on the television side. Rick Allen, Jeff Burton, Steve Letarte and Dale Earnhardt Jr. called the race from the broadcast booth. Dave Burns, Kim Coon and Marty Snider handled the pit road duties from pit lane.

NBC
Booth announcers	Pit reporters
Lap-by-lap: Rick Allen; Color-commentator: Jeff Burton; Color-commentator: Steve Letarte; Color-commentator: Dale Earnhardt Jr.	Dave Burns; Kim Coon; Marty Snider

=== Radio ===
MRN had the radio call for the race, which was also simulcast on Sirius XM NASCAR Radio. Alex Hayden, Jeff Striegle, and former NASCAR crew chief Todd Gordon called the action of the race for MRN when the field raced down the front straightaway. Dave Moody covered the action for MRN in turns 1 & 2, and Mike Bagley had the call of the action from turns 3 & 4. Steve Post, Brienne Pedigo, and Jason Toy covered the action of the race for MRN on pit road.

MRN Radio
Booth announcers	Turn announcers	Pit reporters
Lead announcer: Alex Hayden; Announcer: Jeff Striegle; Announcer: Todd Gordon	Turns 1 & 2: Dave Moody; Turns 3 & 4: Mike Bagley	Steve Post; Brienne Pedigo; Jason Toy

== Standings after the race ==
Drivers' Championship standings

	Pos	Driver	Points
1	1	William Byron	4,126
3	2	Christopher Bell	4,110 (–16)
4	3	Ryan Blaney	4,106 (–20)
3	4	Kyle Larson	4,105 (–21)
1	5	Tyler Reddick	4,096 (–30)
3	6	Martin Truex Jr.	4,089 (–37)
3	7	Denny Hamlin	4,089 (–37)
	8	Chris Buescher	4,063 (–63)
	9	Brad Keselowski	2,262 (–1,864)
	10	Ross Chastain	2,219 (–1,907)
1	11	Bubba Wallace	2,216 (–1,910)
1	12	Kyle Busch	2,210 (–1,916)
	13	Joey Logano	2,198 (–1,928)
	14	Kevin Harvick	2,170 (–1,956)
	15	Michael McDowell	2,145 (–1,981)
	16	Ricky Stenhouse Jr.	2,136 (–1,990)
Official driver's standings

Manufacturers' Championship standings

Pos	Manufacturer	Points
1	Chevrolet	1,258
2	Toyota	1,184 (–74)
3	Ford	1,165 (–93)

- Note: Only the first 16 positions are included for the driver standings.

Previous race: 2023 South Point 400	NASCAR Cup Series; 2023 season	Next race: 2023 Xfinity 500
